= 1992 in Ukrainian football =

Football in Ukraine
- Season: 1992

Men's football
- Vyshcha Liha: SC Tavriya Simferopol
- Persha Liha: Veres Rivne (Group A); Kryvbas Kryvyi Rih (Group B)
- Perekhidna Liha: Dnister Zalishchyky (Group A); Bazhanovets Makiivka (Group B)
- KFK Championship: no competition
- Ukrainian Cup: Chornomorets Odesa

Women's football
- Vyshcha Liha: Dynamo Kyiv
- Persha Liha: Iskra Zaporizhia
- Ukrainian Cup: Dynamo Kyiv

The 1992 season was the 62nd season of competitive football in Ukraine and the first season of fully independent Ukraine following the dissolution of the Soviet Union. This year the Ukrainian Association of Football (as Football Federation of Ukraine) was granted a membership to the international football organizations FIFA and UEFA and allowed to send its clubs to the UEFA continental competitions.

For the first time such former Soviet clubs like FC Dynamo Kyiv and FC Chornomorets Odesa which represented the Soviet Union at European competitions since 1960s qualified for the UEFA competitions representing native Ukrainian nation. For the first time since 1948 FC Dynamo Kyiv returned to compete at the Ukrainian Cup, previously as the Football Cup of the Ukrainian SSR. The champions title of SC Tavriya Simferopol was the first in independent Ukraine and the fourth including competitions of the Football Championship of the Ukrainian SSR.

== National team ==
In 1992, Ukraine national football team conducted its first matches as representatives of now independent Ukraine and FIFA members. The first game was a match between Ukraine and Hungary held on 29 April 1992 at Avanhard Stadium in Uzhhorod, which was the first international home game for Ukraine, saw the first official goal and ended with a 1–3 defeat. The second game in a season took place on 27 June with the United States on away field, and ended in a 0–0 draw, recording a first point for the national team.

=== Results and fixtures ===
29 April 1992 International Friendly	Ukraine	1–3	Hungary	Uzhhorod, Ukraine
17:00 EEST	Hetsko 90'	Report	Salloi 61'; Kiprich 68', 84' (pen.)	Stadium: Avanhard Stadium; Attendance: 13,000; Referee: Vadim Zhuk (Belarus)

27 June 1992 International Friendly	United States	0–0	Ukraine	Piscataway, United States
17:00 UTC-4		Report		Stadium: Rutgers Stadium; Attendance: 11,815; Referee: Michael Caulfield (Ireland)

== Men's football ==
=== Vyshcha Liha (Top League) ===
==== League table ====
===== Group A =====
Pos	Team	Pld	W	D	L	GF	GA	GD	Pts	Qualification or relegation
1	Tavriya Simferopol (C)	18	11	6	1	30	9	+21	28	Qualification to Final playoff
2	Shakhtar Donetsk	18	10	6	2	31	10	+21	26	Qualification to Third place playoff
3	Chornomorets Odesa (Note: Participant of the 1992 Ukrainian Cup Final)	18	9	7	2	30	12	+18	25	Qualification to Cup Winners' Cup qualifying round
4	Torpedo Zaporizhzhia	18	6	7	5	21	16	+5	19	
5	Metalurh Zaporizhzhia	18	6	6	6	20	19	+1	18	
6	Karpaty Lviv	18	5	6	7	15	18	−3	16	
7	Kremin Kremenchuk	18	4	8	6	17	23	−6	16	
8	Nyva Vinnytsia (R)	18	5	4	9	18	33	−15	14	Relegated to Ukrainian First League
9	Evis Mykolaiv (R)	18	3	4	11	12	29	−17	10	Relegated to Ukrainian First League
10	Temp Shepetivka (R)	18	2	4	12	9	34	−25	8	Relegated to Ukrainian First League

Rules for classification: 1st points; 2nd wins; 3rd goal difference
(C) Champions; (R) Relegated

===== Group B =====
Pos	Team	Pld	W	D	L	GF	GA	GD	Pts	Qualification or relegation
1	Dynamo Kyiv	18	13	4	1	31	13	+18	30	Qualification to Final playoff
2	Dnipro Dnipropetrovsk (O)	18	10	3	5	26	15	+11	23	Qualification to Third place playoff
3	Metalist Kharkiv (Note: Participant of the 1992 Ukrainian Cup Final)	18	8	5	5	21	16	+5	21	
4	Nyva Ternopil	18	8	5	5	16	12	+4	21	
5	Volyn Lutsk	18	8	2	8	24	21	+3	18	
6	Bukovyna Chernivtsi	18	7	4	7	17	16	+1	18	
7	Zorya-MALS Luhansk	18	6	5	7	23	23	0	17	
8	Naftovyk Okhtyrka (R)	18	5	3	10	12	28	−16	13	Relegated to Ukrainian First League
9	Prykarpattya Ivano-Frankivsk (R)	18	3	6	9	9	18	−9	12	Relegated to Ukrainian First League
10	Odesa (R)	18	3	1	14	15	32	−17	7	Relegated to Ukrainian First League

Rules for classification: 1st points; 2nd wins; 3rd goal difference
(O) Play-off winners; (R) Relegated

==== Second stage ====
Championship playoff

1992-06-21

SC Tavriya Simferopol	1 – 0	FC Dynamo Kyiv
Shevchenko 75'	Report goal (video)

Ukraina Stadium, Lviv
Attendance: 36,000
Referee: Volodymyr Pianykh (Donetsk), (FIFA)

Tavriya Simferopol

Tavriya Simferopol:
GK	1	(Ukraine) Oleh Kolesov
FW	2	(Ukraine) Serhiy Shevchenko (c)
DF	3	(Ukraine) Mykola Turchinenko
DF	4	(Ukraine) Oleksandr Holovko
DF	5	(Lithuania) Vidmantas Vyšniauskas	(yellow card) 64'
DF	6	(Ukraine) Serhiy Voronezhsky
MF	7	(Ukraine) Andriy Oparin	(substituted off) 77'
DF	8	(Ukraine) Sefer Alibayev
DF	9	(Russia) Yuri Getikov
FW	10	(Russia) Sergei Gladyshev
MF	11	(Ukraine) Vladyslav Novikov
Substitutes:
MF	12	(Ukraine) Yuriy Mikhailus	(substituted on) 77'	(substituted off) 87'
MF	13	(Ukraine) Serhiy Yesin	(substituted on) 87'
Manager:
(Ukraine) Anatoliy Zayayev

Dynamo Kyiv

Dynamo Kyiv:
GK	1	(Lithuania) Valdemaras Martinkėnas
DF	2	(Ukraine) Oleh Luzhnyi
DF	3	(Ukraine) Anatoliy Bezsmertnyi	(substituted off) 55'
DF	4	(Russia) Andrey Aleksanenkov
DF	5	(Ukraine) Serhiy Shmatovalenko (c)
MF	7	(Ukraine) Serhiy Kovalets
MF	6	(Ukraine) Yuri Moroz
DF	8	(Ukraine) Serhiy Zayets
FW	9	(Ukraine) Oleh Salenko
MF	10	(Ukraine) Stepan Betsa
MF	11	(Ukraine) Volodymyr Sharan	(substituted off) 75'
Substitutes:
FW	13	(Ukraine) Oleh Matveyev	(substituted on) 55'
FW	14	(Ukraine) Yuriy Hrytsyna	(substituted on) 75'
Manager:
(Ukraine) Anatoliy Puzach

MATCH OFFICIALS

- Assistant referees:
  - Yevhen Kanana (Donetsk)
  - Oleh Chornyi (Donetsk)

MATCH RULES

- 90 minutes.
- 30 minutes of extra-time if necessary.
- Penalty shoot-out if scores still level.
- Seven named substitutes
- Maximum of 3 substitutions.

Third place playoff

June 20, 1992

Dnipro Dnipropetrovsk	3 – 2	Shakhtar Donetsk
Tyshchenko 19'; Konovalov 38', 74'	Report	Bielichenko 51'; Atelkin 80'

Metalurh Stadium, Zaporizhzhia
Attendance: 3,000
Referee: Tukhovsky (Simferopol)

===== Honors and awards =====
- Top goalscorer: (Ukraine) Yuri Hudymenko, Tavriya Simferopol (12)
- Ukrainian Footballer of the Year: (Ukraine) Viktor Leonenko, Dynamo Kyiv

=== Persha Liha (First League) ===
==== League table ====
===== Group A =====
Pos	Team	Pld	W	D	L	GF	GA	GD	Pts	Promotion or relegation
1	Veres Rivne (C, P)	26	14	8	4	38	15	+23	36	Promoted to Vyshcha Liha
2	Pryladyst Mukacheve	26	14	5	7	27	15	+12	33	
3	Polihraftekhnika Oleksandriya	26	11	8	7	25	27	−2	30	
4	Podillia Khmelnytsky	26	10	10	6	29	21	+8	30	
5	Krystal Chortkiv	26	11	7	8	34	26	+8	29	
6	Desna Chernihiv	26	11	7	8	23	24	−1	29	
7	Dynamo-2 Kyiv	26	9	10	7	33	23	+10	28	
8	Avtomobilist Sumy	26	11	4	11	29	29	0	26	
9	Stal Alchevsk	26	9	8	9	28	22	+6	26	
10	Polissia Zhytomyr (R)	26	10	5	11	30	31	−1	25	Relegated to Second League
11	Halychyna Drohobych (R)	26	9	5	12	25	32	−7	23	Relegated to Second League
12	Dnipro Cherkasy (R)	26	9	4	13	22	27	−5	22	Relegated to Second League
13	Chaika Sevastopol (R)	26	7	4	15	19	39	−20	18	Relegated to Second League
14	SKA Kyiv (R)	26	3	3	20	14	45	−31	9	Relegated to Second League

(C) Champions; (P) Promoted; (R) Relegated

===== Group B =====
Pos	Team	Pld	W	D	L	GF	GA	GD	Pts	Promotion or relegation
1	Kryvbas Kryvyi Rih (C, P)	26	15	10	1	46	23	+23	40	Promoted to Vyshcha Liha
2	Metalurh Nikopol	26	15	7	4	45	19	+26	37	
3	Artania Ochakiv	26	13	6	7	27	24	+3	32	
4	Ros Bila Tserkva	26	13	5	8	40	32	+8	31	
5	Zakarpattia Uzhhorod	26	13	5	8	28	25	+3	31	
6	Skala Stryi	26	11	9	6	39	24	+15	31	
7	Shakhtar Pavlohrad	26	13	4	9	46	33	+13	30	
8	Vorskla Poltava	26	12	5	9	33	25	+8	29	
9	Khimik Severodonetsk	26	10	7	9	28	28	0	27	
10	Krystal Kherson (R)	26	10	5	11	36	36	0	25	Relegated to Second League
11	Azovets Mariupol (R)	26	10	4	12	36	39	−3	24	Relegated to Second League
12	Shakhtar-2 Donetsk (R)	26	5	2	19	25	48	−23	12	Relegated to Second League
13	Vahonobudivnyk Stakhanov (R)	26	4	3	19	16	48	−32	11	Relegated to Second League
14	Chornomorets-2 Odesa (R)	26	0	4	22	14	55	−41	4	Relegated to Second League

(C) Champions; (P) Promoted; (R) Relegated

===== Honors and awards =====
- Top goalscorer: (Ukraine) Denys Filimonov, Kryvbas Kryvyi Rih (16)

=== Perekhidna Liha (Transitional League) ===
==== League table ====
===== Group A =====
Pos	Team	Pld	W	D	L	GF	GA	GD	Pts	Promotion or relegation
1	Dnister Zalishchyky	16	8	5	3	15	13	+2	21	Second League
2	Hazovyk Komarne	16	8	4	4	24	17	+7	20	Second League
3	Yavir Krasnopillia	16	8	4	4	21	19	+2	20	Second League
4	Zirka Kirovohrad	16	8	3	5	35	24	+11	19	Second League
5	Andezyt Khust	16	7	4	5	23	22	+1	18	Transitional League
6	Olympik Kharkiv	16	5	5	6	23	26	−3	15	Transitional League
7	Elektron Romny	16	5	2	9	22	29	−7	12	Transitional League
8	Lysonia Berezhany	16	2	6	8	14	21	−7	10	Transitional League
9	Promin Sambir Raion	16	1	7	8	22	28	−6	9	Transitional League

Source: uafootball.net.ua

===== Group B =====
Pos	Team	Pld	W	D	L	GF	GA	GD	Pts	Promotion or relegation
1	Bazhanovets Makiivka	16	10	3	3	25	8	+17	23	Second League
2	Titan Armyansk	16	8	5	3	19	10	+9	21	Second League
3	Meliorator Kakhovka	16	8	5	3	21	16	+5	21	Second League
4	Druzhba Osypenko	16	5	11	0	17	8	+9	21	Second League
5	Prometei Shakhtarsk	16	8	4	4	27	10	+17	20	Transitional League
6	Okean Kerch	16	6	5	5	16	10	+6	17	Transitional League
7	Hirnyk Khartsyzk	16	4	1	11	10	33	−23	9	Transitional League
8	Antratsyt Kirovske	16	2	3	11	15	32	−17	7	Transitional League
9	More Feodosia	16	1	3	12	2	25	−23	5	Transitional League

Source: uafootball.net.ua

== Women's football ==
=== Vyshcha Liha (Top League) ===
==== League table ====
Pos	Team	Pld	W	D	L	GF	GA	GD	Pts	Qualification or relegation
1	Dynamo Kyiv	18	16	2	0	54	6	+48	34	Champions
2	Arena-Hospodar Kyiv	18	9	6	3	26	14	+12	24	
3	Lehenda Chernihiv	18	8	5	5	26	21	+5	21	
4	Olimp Kyiv	18	7	5	6	26	18	+8	19	
5	Bukovynka Chernivtsi	18	5	9	4	19	15	+4	19	Withdrew after the season
6	Luhanochka Luhansk	18	8	2	8	17	25	−8	18	
7	Borysfen Zaporizhia	18	4	9	5	13	19	−6	17	
8	Dnipro Dnipropetrovsk	18	5	2	11	19	34	−15	12	
9	Krym-Yuni Simferopol	18	2	6	10	14	34	−20	10	
10	Chornomorochka Odesa	18	0	6	12	6	34	−28	6	Qualification to relegation play-offs

Source: WFPL.ua, Womensfootball.ua

===== Honors and awards =====
- Top goalscorer: (Ukraine) Svitlana Frishko, Dynamo Kyiv (21)

== Domestic cups ==
=== Men ===
==== Ukrainian Cup ====
===== Main bracket =====
Round of 32
Polissya Zhytomyr	1
Stal Alchevsk	0
Chornomorets
bye
Vahonobudivnyk	2
Avtomobilist Sumy	0
Metalurh Zaporizhia
bye
Torpedo Zaporizhia	3
SKA Odesa	0
Kryvbas Kryvyi Rih	2
Vorskla Poltava	1
Dynamo Kyiv
bye
Zorya-MALS Luhansk	1
Skala Stryi	2
Karpaty Lviv (p)	0 (4)
Dnipro Cherkasy	0 (2)
Shakhtar Donetsk
bye
Bukovyna (a.e.t.)	1
Azovets Mariupol	0
Dnipro
bye
Krystal Chortkiv	2
Shakhtar Pavlohrad	0
Metalist Kharkiv
bye
Naftovyk Okhtyrka	3
Tavriya Simferopol	1
Kremin Kremenchuk	2
Polihraftekhnika	0

Round of 16
Polissya Zhytomyr	4	1	5
Chornomorets (a.e.t.)	1	7	8
Vahonobudivnyk	1	0	1
Metalurh Zaporizhia	0	7	7
Torpedo Zaporizhia	6	0	6
Kryvbas Kryvyi Rih	0	1	1
Dynamo Kyiv (a.e.t.)	1	2	3
Skala Stryi	1	1	2
Karpaty Lviv	1	0	1
Shakhtar Donetsk	2	2	4
Bukovyna Chernivtsi	1	1	2
Dnipro Dnipropetrovsk	2	3	5
Krystal Chortkiv	1	0	1
Metalist Kharkiv	2	2	4
Naftovyk Okhtyrka	1	1	2
Kremin Kremenchuk	1	0	1

Quarterfinals
Chornomorets	2	1	3
Metalurh Zaporizhia	0	1	1
Torpedo Zaporizhia	1	1	2
Dynamo Kyiv	0	1	1
Shakhtar Donetsk	6	0	6
Dnipro Dnipropetrovsk	0	1	1
Metalist Kharkiv	2	0	2
Naftovyk Okhtyrka	0	1	1

Semifinals
Chornomorets	3	0	3
Torpedo Zaporizhia	1	0	1
Shakhtar Donetsk	0	1	1
Metalist Kharkiv	1	1	2

Final
Chornomorets (a.e.t.)	1
Metalist Kharkiv	0

===== Final =====
31 May 1992
19:00

Chornomorets Odesa (PL)	1–0 (a.e.t.)	(PL) Metalist Kharkiv
Tsymbalar 107'	Report

Republican Stadium, Kyiv
Attendance: 12,000
Referee: Yevhen Kanana (Donetsk)

=== Women ===
Semifinals
Dynamo Kyiv	5	2	7
Krym-YuNI Simferopol	0	0	0
Arena-Hospodar Fastiv	1	1	2
Bukovynka Chernivtsi	1	0	1

Final
Dynamo Kyiv	1	0	1
Arena-Hospodar Fastiv	0	0	0

== Ukrainian clubs in international competition ==
=== 1991–92 European competitions ===
==== European Cup ====
===== Group stage =====
====== Group B ======
Pos	Team	Pld	W	D	L	GF	GA	GD	Pts	Qualification	BAR	SPP	BEN	DKV
1	(Spain) Barcelona	6	4	1	1	10	4	+6	9	Advance to final	—	3–2	2–1	3–0
2	(Czechoslovakia) Sparta Prague	6	2	2	2	7	7	0	6		1–0	—	1–1	2–1
3	(Portugal) Benfica	6	1	3	2	8	5	+3	5		0–0	1–1	—	5–0
4	(Commonwealth of Independent States) Dynamo Kyiv	6	2	0	4	3	12	−9	4		0–2	1–0	1–0	—

Source: UEFA

4 March 1992 Group stage	Dynamo Kyiv (Commonwealth of Independent States)	0–2	(Spain) Barcelona	Kyiv, Ukraine
19:00		Report	Stoichkov 33'; Salinas 66'	Stadium: Republican Stadium; Attendance: 48,500; Referee: Guy Goethals (Belgium)

18 March 1992 Group stage	Barcelona (Spain)	3–0	(Commonwealth of Independent States) Dynamo Kyiv	Barcelona, Spain
20:45	Stoichkov 60', 81'; Salinas 88'	Report		Stadium: Camp Nou; Attendance: 53,000; Referee: Karl-Josef Assenmacher (Germany)

1 April 1992 Group stage	Benfica (Portugal)	5–0	(Commonwealth of Independent States) Dynamo Kyiv	Lisbon, Portugal
21:00	Brito 25', 62'; Isaías 71'; Yuran 83', 87'	Report		Stadium: Estádio da Luz; Attendance: 78,000; Referee: Mario van der Ende (Netherlands)

15 April 1992 Group stage	Dynamo Kyiv (Commonwealth of Independent States)	1–0	(Czechoslovakia) Sparta Prague	Kyiv, Ukraine
21:00	Salenko 82'	Report		Stadium: Republican Stadium; Attendance: 5,000; Referee: Brian McGinlay (Scotland)
