= 1992 Vyshcha Liha final =

- Event: 1992 Vyshcha Liha
Tavriya Simferopol	Dynamo Kyiv
1	0
- Date: 21 June 1992
- Venue: Ukraina Stadium, Lviv
- Referee: Volodymyr Pyanykh (Donetsk)
- Attendance: 36,000
- Weather: 29°C

The 1992 Vyshcha Liha final is a football match that was played at the Ukraina Stadium, Lviv on June 21, 1992. The match was the 1st league's final and was contested by both groups leaders Tavriya Simferopol and Dynamo Kyiv.

Winning the game allowed Tavriya to qualify for its first European Cup competition in the club's history, while the surprising loss of Dynamo send the club to the 1992-93 UEFA Cup.

== Road to Lviv ==
The following tables show round by round standing of both clubs in their respective groups, each of which consisted of 10 clubs.

=== Group A ===
Team ╲ Round	1	2	3	4	5	6	7	8	9	10	11	12	13	14	15	16	17	18	19	20
Tavriya Simferopol	1	2	1	2	1	1	1	1	1	1	1	1	1	1	1	1	1	1	1	1

Source: Aleksey Kobyzev's Web-Site (in Russian)

Pos	Team	Pld	W	D	L	GF	GA	GD	Pts
1	Tavriya Simferopol	18	11	6	1	30	9	+21	28

Rules for classification: 1st points; 2nd wins; 3rd goal difference

=== Group B ===
Team ╲ Round	1	2	3	4	5	6	7	8	9	10	11	12	13	14	15	16	17	18	19	20
Dynamo Kyiv	2	2	3	1	2	2	2	1	1	1	1	1	1	1	1	1	1	1	1	1

Source: Aleksey Kobyzev's Web-Site (in Russian)

Pos	Team	Pld	W	D	L	GF	GA	GD	Pts
1	Dynamo Kyiv	18	13	4	1	31	13	+18	30

Rules for classification: 1st points; 2nd wins; 3rd goal difference

== Previous encounters ==
This was the first Vyshcha Liha Final between the two teams. Previously the two teams met only once in a league format during the Soviet competitions back in 1981 (1981 Soviet Top League). In 1981 Tavriya managed to tie at home 0:0, but lost its away game 1:3 placing second to last, while Dynamo became the champions.

== Match ==
It was decided to conduct the season final at Ukraina Stadium (formerly - Druzhba) in Lviv.

Before the game, both teams had some problems with their squad for various reasons. Dynamo was missing Akhrik Tsveiba, who was still participating in the UEFA Euro 1992. The club's main striker Viktor Leonenko was serving a few months-long disqualification by FIFA, while another Kyiv leader Pavlo Yakovenko was missing due to injury. Tavriya on the other hand was missing disqualified Ihor Volkov and Sergey Andreyev and in addition there was injured Talyat Sheikhametov and the season's top scorer Yuriy Hudymenko did not feel well.

The vast majority of 38,000 fans who filled the stands of "Ukraina" supported the capital's team. However, on that hot day, the latter was not helped by the "12th player", nor by early arrival to the city of Leo. All attempts of Anatoliy Puzach's wards to establish collective actions were shattered against the cool-headed and balanced actions of Simferopolians. Defending with bigger forces, Tavriya was not forgetting about counterattacks. More often than not, it was simply luring its opponent onto its own half of the field, and then, after intercepting a ball, organizing sharp and dangerous raids.

Tactics that were picked by Anatoliy Zayaev and his assistant Andriy Cheremysin worked, and counterarguments against them were not found by Dynamo's players. The scales were ultimately turned towards the Crimeans by the most active performer in their squad. The Tavriya's captain Sergei Shevchenko managed not only to ruin attacks of Kyivans, but also quite often bothered the goalkeeper Valdemaras Martinkenas with far "shots". With 15 minutes before the end of the match, responding to the serve of Andriy Oparin from a corner kick, the 32-year-old halfback playing to forestall with a soft header, volleyed the ball into the goal. "I knew that I would score, after all, it was our standardized combination. How many I already laid as such!" – smiled after the hero of the match.

The Dynamo players were running out of time to organize the final successful attack. After the game, the former president of FFU Viktor Bannikov awarded the winners with the champion's cup, and personally presented Shevchenko with the best player of the season award. Besides that, Sergei and Kyivan Oleh Luzhnyi were awarded embroidered shirts as the most valuable footballers for both teams. After that, there was a circle of honor and spectators' applause who, at the end of the game, ardently supported the Crimean club.

=== Details ===
1992-06-21

SC Tavriya Simferopol	1 – 0	FC Dynamo Kyiv
Shevchenko 75'	Report goal (video)

Ukraina Stadium, Lviv
Attendance: 36,000
Referee: Volodymyr Pianykh (Donetsk), (FIFA)

Tavriya Simferopol

Tavriya Simferopol:
GK	1	(Ukraine) Oleh Kolesov
FW	2	(Ukraine) Serhiy Shevchenko (c)
DF	3	(Ukraine) Mykola Turchinenko
DF	4	(Ukraine) Oleksandr Holovko
DF	5	(Lithuania) Vidmantas Vyšniauskas	(yellow card) 64'
DF	6	(Ukraine) Serhiy Voronezhsky
MF	7	(Ukraine) Andriy Oparin	(substituted off) 77'
DF	8	(Ukraine) Sefer Alibayev
DF	9	(Russia) Yuri Getikov
FW	10	(Russia) Sergei Gladyshev
MF	11	(Ukraine) Vladyslav Novikov
Substitutes:
MF	12	(Ukraine) Yuriy Mikhailus	(substituted on) 77'	(substituted off) 87'
MF	13	(Ukraine) Serhiy Yesin	(substituted on) 87'
Manager:
(Ukraine) Anatoliy Zayayev

Dynamo Kyiv

Dynamo Kyiv:
GK	1	(Lithuania) Valdemaras Martinkėnas
DF	2	(Ukraine) Oleh Luzhnyi
DF	3	(Ukraine) Anatoliy Bezsmertnyi	(substituted off) 55'
DF	4	(Russia) Andrey Aleksanenkov
DF	5	(Ukraine) Serhiy Shmatovalenko (c)
MF	7	(Ukraine) Serhiy Kovalets
MF	6	(Ukraine) Yuri Moroz
DF	8	(Ukraine) Serhiy Zayets
FW	9	(Ukraine) Oleh Salenko
MF	10	(Ukraine) Stepan Betsa
MF	11	(Ukraine) Volodymyr Sharan	(substituted off) 75'
Substitutes:
FW	13	(Ukraine) Oleh Matveyev	(substituted on) 55'
FW	14	(Ukraine) Yuriy Hrytsyna	(substituted on) 75'
Manager:
(Ukraine) Anatoliy Puzach

MATCH OFFICIALS

- Assistant referees:
  - Yevhen Kanana (Donetsk)
  - Oleh Chornyi (Donetsk)

MATCH RULES

- 90 minutes.
- 30 minutes of extra-time if necessary.
- Penalty shoot-out if scores still level.
- Seven named substitutes
- Maximum of 3 substitutions.

== See also ==
- 1992 Vyshcha Liha
