= 1992 Vyshcha Liha =

1st season of top-tier football league in Vyshcha Liha

Vyshcha Liha
- Season: 1992
- Dates: 6 March – 17 June (regular season); 20 June – 21 June (play-offs)
- Champions: SC Tavriya Simferopol; 1st title
- Relegated: Nyva Vinnytsia; Naftovyk Okhtyrka; Prykarpattia Ivano-Frankivsk; Evis Mykolaiv; Temp Shepetivka; SKA Odesa
- Champions League: Tavriya Simferopol
- Cup Winners' Cup: Chornomorets Odesa
- UEFA Cup: Dynamo Kyiv
- Matches: 182
- Goals: 403 (2.21 per match)
- Top goalscorer: (12) Yuriy Hudymenko (Tavriya)
- Biggest home win: Tavriya 6–0 Temp; Chornomorets 6–0 Nyva V.
- Biggest away win: Evis 1–6 Shakhtar
- Highest scoring: Dnipro 4–3 SC Odesa; Evis 1–6 Shakhtar
- Highest attendance: 36,000 – Tavriya–Dynamo (final)
- Lowest attendance: 280 – Dynamo–Nyva T.
- Average attendance: 5,703

The 1992 Vyshcha Liha (Ukrainian: Чемпіонат серед команд вищої ліги) was the first football championship organized by the reformed Football Federation of Ukraine after the dissolution of the Soviet Union. The Football Federation of Ukraine, when organizing the competition, decided to shift its calendar to synchronize it with a common in Europe "fall-spring" and organized a short championship to secure berth spots for the 1992–93 European club competitions.

The newly formed competition involved the participation of Ukraine-based football "teams of masters" (professional teams) from the top All-Union football competitions, including the 1991 Soviet Vysshaya Liga teams.

The first two games of Round 1 took place on 6 March 1992 in Odesa, where local Chornomorets was hosting Karpaty, and Mykolaiv, where local Evis was playing against the visiting Temp.

== Teams and organization ==
=== League's formation and issues ===
==== Composition ====
The league and its calendar were adopted at the FFU Executive Committee session on 10 September 1991 with the ongoing 1991 season of the All-Soviet football competitions. It was established that the new league would consist of 20 teams divided into two groups. Six clubs (last three from each group) were set to be relegated and replaced with the two best from the First League, thus reducing the league for the next season to 16. Winners of both groups were to play against one another for the national title. The league's final was originally planned to consist of two games (home and away), but later, due to scheduling of the Ukraine national football team's games, it was changed to one on a neutral field.

To the league were included all Ukrainian clubs of the 1991 Soviet Top and First leagues (8 clubs), nine of eleven Ukrainian clubs out the 1991 Soviet Second League (all of them competed in the west zone), the two best teams of the 1991 Soviet Second (lower) League and the winner of the Ukrainian Cup. The FFU president Viktor Bannikov was against to include the Ukrainian Cup winner into the top league.

There were opponents of organization of the championship among the most notable was FC Metalurh Zaporizhya. The FC Metalist Kharkiv was against with the condition if they would be relegated from the 1991 Soviet Top League. Also against the championship was Yevhen Kucherevskyi (FC Dnipro Dnipropetrovsk, one of few Ukrainian coaches who managed to win the Soviet Top League).

There were plenty of alternative propositions on the composition and the season's calendar, among which were from the president of Prykarpattia Anatoliy Revutskyi and the head coach of Temp Ishtvan Sekech.

==== Calendar ====
The championship started on March 6, about a month after the qualification rounds of another national tournament, the first edition of Ukrainian Cup. The first half of the season was scheduled to finish on April 19, with the second one to resume on April 25 (6 days intermission). The last round was to be played on June 17.

Considering such a schedule and the fact that the Ukrainian Cup competition was on the way simultaneously, the Ukrainian clubs had to forfeit their scheduled games in the Soviet Cup competition. In addition to that, Dynamo Kyiv also participated in the Champions League competition, which ended for Dynamo only on April 15. Each team this season had at least two games scheduled every week on average.

Considering other official games (outside of the league), FC Torpedo Zaporizhzhia and FC Dynamo Kyiv have played a record 26 games from February 18 through June 21, the most among the other clubs in the League.

=== Location of teams ===
Locations of teams home grounds in Ukrainian Premier League 1992
Group A Group B

=== Qualified teams ===
Team	League and position in 1991		Coach	Replaced coach
Chornomorets Odesa	Soviet Top League	4	Viktor Prokopenko	
Dynamo Kyiv	Soviet Top League	5	Anatoliy Puzach	
Dnipro Dnipropetrovsk	Soviet Top League	9	Mykola Pavlov	Yevhen Kucherevsky
Shakhtar Donetsk	Soviet Top League	12	Valery Yaremchenko	
Metalurh Zaporizhya	Soviet Top League	13	Ihor Nadein	
Metalist Kharkiv	Soviet Top League	15	Leonid Tkachenko	
Bukovyna Chernivtsi	Soviet First League	5	Yukhym Shkolnykov	
Tavriya Simferopol	Soviet First League	6	Anatoliy Zayaev	
Karpaty Lviv	Soviet Second League, West	1	Stepan Yurchyshyn	
Zorya-MALS Luhansk	Soviet Second League, West	2	Anatoliy Kuksov	
Nyva Ternopil	Soviet Second League, West	4	Leonid Koltun	
Nyva Vinnytsia	Soviet Second League, West	5	Valery Petrov	Vyacheslav Hrozny
Torpedo Zaporizhzhia	Soviet Second League, West	7	Yevhen Lemeshko	
Volyn Lutsk	Soviet Second League, West	8	Myron Markevych	
SC Odesa	Soviet Second League, West	10	Serhiy Marusyn	
Kremin Kremenchuk	Soviet Second League, West	13	Volodymyr Lozynskyi	
Evis Mykolaiv	Soviet Second League, West	15	Ivan Balan	
Naftovyk Okhtyrka	Soviet Second League B, Zone 1 Championship of the Ukrainian SSR	1	Valery Dushkov	
Prykarpattya	Soviet Second League B, Zone 1 Championship of the Ukrainian SSR	2	Yuriy Shuliatytskyi	Ivan Krasnetskyi
Temp Shepetivka	Soviet Second League B, Zone 1 Winner of Cup of the Ukrainian SSR	9	Ishtvan Sekech	

Note:

- FC Temp Shepetivka placed only 9th in the 1991 Soviet Lower Second League.
- FC Halychyna Drohobych and FC Vorskla Poltava that competed in the Soviet Second League were placed in the Persha Liha (Ukrainian Second Division) as such that were relegated.

=== Clubs' name changes ===
- Zorya-MALS Luhansk before the season carried the name Zorya Luhansk. A name extension was provided for sponsorship reasons.
- Evis Mykolaiv before the season carried the name Sudnobudivnyk Mykolaiv.
- SC Odesa changed its name from SKA Odesa on May 5, 1992, due to restructuring of the Soviet Odesa Military District and Armed Forces of Ukraine.

== Stadiums ==
Rank	Stadium	Club	Capacity	Highest Attendance		Notes
1	Republican Stadium	Dynamo Kyiv	100,000	5,000	Round 8 (Zorya-MALS)	
2	Metalist Stadium	Metalist Kharkiv	38,633	7,000	Round 15 (Dnipro)	
3	Black Sea Shipping Central Stadium	Chornomorets	34,362	9,500	Round 15 (Tavriya)	
4	Shakhtar Stadium	Shakhtar Donetsk	31,718	4,300	Round 20 (Tavriya)	
5	Ukraina Stadium	Karpaty Lviv	28,051	13,000	Round 3 (Tavriya)	
5	Ukraina Stadium	Tavriya Simferopol	28,051	36,000	Final (Dynamo)	
6	Central City Stadium	Evis Mykolaiv	25,175	15,000	Round 4 (Chornomorets)	
7	Meteor Stadium	Dnipro	24,381	6,000	Round 13 (Dynamo)	
8	Lokomotyv Stadium	Nyva Vinnytsia	24,000	10,000	Round 17 (Shakhtar)	
9	Avanhard Stadium	Zorya-MALS	22,320	17,200	Round 14 (Dynamo)	
10	Lokomotiv Stadium	Tavriya Simferopol	19,978	3,500	Round 17 (Karpaty)	
11	Dynamo Stadium	Dynamo Kyiv	16,873	2,500	Round 17 (SC Odesa)	as home ground in Round 12 and 17
12	AutoZAZ Stadium	Torpedo Zaporizhzhia	15,000	5,000	Round 10 (Chornomorets)	
13	City Stadium	Nyva Ternopil	12,750	20,000	Round 10 (Dynamo)	
14	Bukovyna Stadium	Bukovyna Chernivtsi	12,000	14,000	Round 6 (Dynamo)	
15	Metalurh Central Stadium	Metalurh Zaporizhya	11,983	8,000	Round 1 (Shakhtar)	
15	Metalurh Central Stadium	Dnipro	11,983	3,000	Playoff (Shakhtar)	
16	Dnipro Stadium	Kremin Kremenchuk	11,300	13,000	Round 14 (Chornomorets)	
17	Avanhard Stadium	Volyn Lutsk	10,792	20,000	Round 9 (Dynamo)	
18	Elektron Stadium	Prykarpattya		15,000	Round 5 (Dynamo)	
19	Naftovyk Stadium	Naftovyk Okhtyrka	5,256	4,500	Round 16 (Dnipro)	
20	SKA Stadium	SC Odesa		6,000	Round 4 (Dynamo)	
21	Temp Stadium	Temp Shepetivka		10,000	Round 8 (Shakhtar)	

=== Managerial changes ===
Managerial changes approximated

Team	Outgoing head coach	Date of replacement	Table	Incoming head coach
Nyva Ternopil	(Ukraine) Mykhailo Dunets		Pre season	(Ukraine) Leonid Koltun
Dnipro Dnipropetrovsk	(Ukraine) Yevhen Kucherevskyi	March 10, 1992	1st (Group B)	(Ukraine) Mykola Pavlov
Nyva Vinnytsia	(Ukraine) Vyacheslav Hrozny	March 28, 1992	10th (Group A)	(Ukraine) Valery Petrov
Prykarpattia Ivano-Frankivsk	(Ukraine) Ivan Krasnetskyi	April 1992	9th (Group B)	(Ukraine) Yuriy Shuliatytskyi

== First stage ==
=== European qualification ===
- Before 17th Round, Chornomorets Odesa qualified for the 1992–93 Cup Winners' Cup qualifying round after winning 1992 Ukrainian Cup.
- After 17th Round, Dynamo Kyiv qualified for the Championship play-off.
- After 20th Round, Tavriya Simferopol qualified for the Championship playoff.
- Tavriya won the title and was admitted to the European Cup, their opponents in the final, Dynamo, qualified for the UEFA Cup.

=== Group A final standings ===
Pos	Team	Pld	W	D	L	GF	GA	GD	Pts	Qualification or relegation
1	Tavriya Simferopol (C)	18	11	6	1	30	9	+21	28	Qualification to Final playoff
2	Shakhtar Donetsk	18	10	6	2	31	10	+21	26	Qualification to Third place playoff
3	Chornomorets Odesa (Note: Participant of the 1992 Ukrainian Cup Final)	18	9	7	2	30	12	+18	25	Qualification to Cup Winners' Cup qualifying round
4	Torpedo Zaporizhzhia	18	6	7	5	21	16	+5	19	
5	Metalurh Zaporizhzhia	18	6	6	6	20	19	+1	18	
6	Karpaty Lviv	18	5	6	7	15	18	−3	16	
7	Kremin Kremenchuk	18	4	8	6	17	23	−6	16	
8	Nyva Vinnytsia (R)	18	5	4	9	18	33	−15	14	Relegated to Ukrainian First League
9	Evis Mykolaiv (R)	18	3	4	11	12	29	−17	10	Relegated to Ukrainian First League
10	Temp Shepetivka (R)	18	2	4	12	9	34	−25	8	Relegated to Ukrainian First League

Rules for classification: 1st points; 2nd wins; 3rd goal difference
(C) Champions; (R) Relegated
Notes:

Home \ Away	CHO	EVS	KRE	KAR	MZA	NVI	SHA	TAV	TMP	TOR
Chornomorets Odesa	—	2–1	1–1	2–2	2–0	6–0	3–0	0–0	3–1	2–1 (Note: The Round 12 match Chornomorets vs Torpedo was originally scheduled for 29 April. Still, because Chornomorets delegated their players for the Ukraine vs Hungary match, the game was postponed to 3 June. Similar accommodations were granted to Shakhtar as well as Dnipro and Dynamo in Group B.)
Evis Mykolaiv	1–2	—	0–0	1–1	1–0	2–1	1–6 (Note: The Round 12 match Evis vs Shakhtar was originally scheduled for 29 April. Still, because Shakhtar delegated their players for the Ukraine vs Hungary match, the game was postponed to 3 June. Similar accommodations were granted to Chornomorets as well as Dnipro and Dynamo in Group B.)	1–2	1–0	1–1
Kremin Kremenchuk	1–1	2–1	—	1–0	0–1	1–0	2–3	1–1	1–1	1–1
Karpaty Lviv	2–1	2–0	1–1	—	0–0	2–1	1–0	0–2	2–0	0–0
Metalurh Zaporizhzhia	1–1	2–0	1–0	1–1	—	4–1	1–1	2–2	3–1	0–1
Nyva Vinnytsia	0–0	2–0	4–2	3–0	1–1	—	0–0	0–1	0–0	3–1
Shakhtar Donetsk	0–0	2–0	2–0	1–0	2–0	5–0	—	0–0	2–0	0–0
Tavriya Simferopol	1–0	1–0	3–0	1–0	2–1	4–1	1–1	—	6–0	2–0
Temp Shepetivka	0–2	1–1	2–3	1–0	0–2	0–1	0–4	1–0	—	1–1
Torpedo Zaporizhzhia	0–2	2–0	0–0	2–1	3–0	4–0	1–2	1–1	2–0	—

Source: uafootball.net.ua
Legend: Blue = home team win; Yellow = draw; Red = away team win.
Notes:

Notes:

Team ╲ Round	1	2	3	4	5	6	7	8	9	10	11	12	13	14	15	16	17	18	19	20
Chornomorets Odesa	6	1	3	3	5	5	2	3	3	3	2	2	2	2	2	2	2	2	3	3
Evis Mykolaiv	2	3	5	6	7	8	9	7	8	9	8	8	8	8	8	8	9	9	9	9
Kremin Kremenchuk	2	4	6	7	6	6	6	6	6	6	6	6	6	6	6	6	6	6	6	7
Karpaty Lviv	4	5	8	8	9	9	8	8	7	8	7	7	7	7	7	7	7	7	7	6
Metalurh Zaporizhya	7	8	4	5	3	3	3	4	5	4	3	3	4	4	4	4	4	4	4	5
Nyva Vinnytsia	8	9	10	10	10	10	10	10	10	10	10	10	10	9	10	9	8	8	8	8
Shakhtar Donetsk	5	6	2	1	2	2	4	2	2	2	4	4	3	3	3	3	3	3	2	2
Tavriya Simferopol	1	2	1	2	1	1	1	1	1	1	1	1	1	1	1	1	1	1	1	1
Temp Shepetivka	8	10	9	9	8	7	7	9	9	7	9	9	9	10	9	10	10	10	10	10
Torpedo Zaporizhzhia	10	7	7	4	4	4	5	5	4	5	5	5	5	5	5	5	5	5	5	4

Source: Aleksey Kobyzev's Web-Site (in Russian)

=== Group B final standings ===
Pos	Team	Pld	W	D	L	GF	GA	GD	Pts	Qualification or relegation
1	Dynamo Kyiv	18	13	4	1	31	13	+18	30	Qualification to Final playoff
2	Dnipro Dnipropetrovsk (O)	18	10	3	5	26	15	+11	23	Qualification to Third place playoff
3	Metalist Kharkiv (Note: Participant of the 1992 Ukrainian Cup Final)	18	8	5	5	21	16	+5	21	
4	Nyva Ternopil	18	8	5	5	16	12	+4	21	
5	Volyn Lutsk	18	8	2	8	24	21	+3	18	
6	Bukovyna Chernivtsi	18	7	4	7	17	16	+1	18	
7	Zorya-MALS Luhansk	18	6	5	7	23	23	0	17	
8	Naftovyk Okhtyrka (R)	18	5	3	10	12	28	−16	13	Relegated to Ukrainian First League
9	Prykarpattya Ivano-Frankivsk (R)	18	3	6	9	9	18	−9	12	Relegated to Ukrainian First League
10	Odesa (R)	18	3	1	14	15	32	−17	7	Relegated to Ukrainian First League

Rules for classification: 1st points; 2nd wins; 3rd goal difference
(O) Play-off winners; (R) Relegated
Notes:

Home \ Away	BUK	DNI	DYN	MET	NAF	NVT	ODE	PIF	VOL	ZOR
Bukovyna Chernivtsi	—	1–2	0–0 (Note: The Round 6 match Bukovyna vs Dynamo was originally scheduled for 30 March. Still, because Dynamo had a scheduled game in the 1991–92 European Cup group stage against Benfica on 1 April, the game was postponed to 23 April.)	0–1	3–0	2–1	3–1	0–0	2–1	3–1
Dnipro	0–1	—	0–1	2–1	2–0	4–1	4–3	1–0	3–0	2–0
Dynamo Kyiv	1–0	2–2	—	2–1	1–0	1–0 (Note: The Round 12 match Dynamo vs Nyva was originally scheduled for 29 April. Still, because Dynamo delegated their players for the Ukraine vs Hungary match, the game was postponed to 14 May. Similar accommodations were granted to Dnipro as well as Chornomorets and Shakhtar in Group A.)	4–2	2–0	2–0	2–1
Metalist Kharkiv	0–0	1–0	2–1	—	2–0	0–0	0–2	1–0	3–1	1–0
Naftovyk Okhtyrka	0–0	0–1	1–3	1–0	—	0–0	3–1	1–0	2–1	2–2
Nyva Ternopil	1–0	1–0	0–2	1–1	2–0	—	1–0	2–0	2–0 (Note: The Round 16 match Nyva vs Volyn was originally scheduled for 21 May. But because both teams had a bye on the matchday, the game took place early on 2 May.)	2–0
SC Odesa	3–0	1–1	1–3	0–3	0–1	0–1	—	1–0	0–2	0–1
Prykarpattia Ivano-Frankivsk	0–1	0–1 (Note: The Round 12 match Prykarpattia vs Dnipro was originally scheduled for 29 April. Still, because Dnipro delegated their players for the Ukraine vs Hungary match, the game was postponed to 14 May. Similar accommodations were granted to Dynamo as well as Chornomorets and Shakhtar in Group A.)	0–0	1–1	4–1	0–0	1–0	—	0–0	2–1
Volyn Lutsk	2–0	1–0	2–3 (Note: The Round 9 match Volyn vs Dynamo was originally scheduled for 16 April. Still, because Dynamo had a scheduled game in the 1991–92 European Cup group stage against Sparta on 15 April, the game was postponed to 3 June.)	3–1 (Note: The Round 13 match Volyn vs Metalist was originally scheduled for 7 May. But because both teams had a bye on the matchday, the game took place early on 16 April (Round 9).)	3–0	1–0	3–0	1–1	—	2–0
Zorya-MALS Luhansk	2–1	1–1	1–1	2–2	3–0	1–1	1–0	4–0	2–1	—

Source: uafootball.net.ua
Legend: Blue = home team win; Yellow = draw; Red = away team win.
Notes:

Notes:

Team ╲ Round	1	2	3	4	5	6	7	8	9	10	11	12	13	14	15	16	17	18	19	20
Bukovyna Chernivtsi	2	1	1	2	1	1	1	2	2	2	3	2	2	2	4	5	3	4	5	6
Dnipro	1	4	7	7	7	4	5	4	5	3	2	2	3	3	2	2	2	2	2	2
Dynamo Kyiv	2	2	3	1	2	2	2	1	1	1	1	1	1	1	1	1	1	1	1	1
Metalist Kharkiv	7	3	2	3	3	5	3	3	3	5	4	4	6	6	6	3	4	3	3	3
Naftovyk Okhtyrka	4	5	6	6	6	8	8	5	6	4	6	7	8	8	8	8	8	9	8	8
Nyva Ternopil	7	7	4	4	4	6	6	7	4	8	5	6	5	5	3	4	5	5	4	4
Odesa	9	10	9	9	10	10	10	10	10	10	10	10	10	10	10	10	10	10	10	10
Ivano-Frankivsk	5	6	8	8	8	7	7	8	9	9	9	9	9	9	9	9	9	8	9	9
Volyn Lutsk	5	7	5	4	4	3	4	6	7	7	8	5	4	4	5	6	6	7	6	5
Zoria Luhansk	10	9	9	10	9	9	9	9	8	6	7	8	7	7	7	7	7	6	7	7

Source: Aleksey Kobyzev's Web-Site (in Russian)

== Second stage ==
=== Championship playoff ===
1992-06-21

SC Tavriya Simferopol	1 – 0	FC Dynamo Kyiv
Shevchenko 75'	Report goal (video)

Ukraina Stadium, Lviv
Attendance: 36,000
Referee: Volodymyr Pianykh (Donetsk), (FIFA)

Tavriya Simferopol

Tavriya Simferopol:
GK	1	(Ukraine) Oleh Kolesov
FW	2	(Ukraine) Serhiy Shevchenko (c)
DF	3	(Ukraine) Mykola Turchinenko
DF	4	(Ukraine) Oleksandr Holovko
DF	5	(Lithuania) Vidmantas Vyšniauskas	(yellow card) 64'
DF	6	(Ukraine) Serhiy Voronezhsky
MF	7	(Ukraine) Andriy Oparin	(substituted off) 77'
DF	8	(Ukraine) Sefer Alibayev
DF	9	(Russia) Yuri Getikov
FW	10	(Russia) Sergei Gladyshev
MF	11	(Ukraine) Vladyslav Novikov
Substitutes:
MF	12	(Ukraine) Yuriy Mikhailus	(substituted on) 77'	(substituted off) 87'
MF	13	(Ukraine) Serhiy Yesin	(substituted on) 87'
Manager:
(Ukraine) Anatoliy Zayayev

Dynamo Kyiv

Dynamo Kyiv:
GK	1	(Lithuania) Valdemaras Martinkėnas
DF	2	(Ukraine) Oleh Luzhnyi
DF	3	(Ukraine) Anatoliy Bezsmertnyi	(substituted off) 55'
DF	4	(Russia) Andrey Aleksanenkov
DF	5	(Ukraine) Serhiy Shmatovalenko (c)
MF	7	(Ukraine) Serhiy Kovalets
MF	6	(Ukraine) Yuri Moroz
DF	8	(Ukraine) Serhiy Zayets
FW	9	(Ukraine) Oleh Salenko
MF	10	(Ukraine) Stepan Betsa
MF	11	(Ukraine) Volodymyr Sharan	(substituted off) 75'
Substitutes:
FW	13	(Ukraine) Oleh Matveyev	(substituted on) 55'
FW	14	(Ukraine) Yuriy Hrytsyna	(substituted on) 75'
Manager:
(Ukraine) Anatoliy Puzach

MATCH OFFICIALS

- Assistant referees:
  - Yevhen Kanana (Donetsk)
  - Oleh Chornyi (Donetsk)

MATCH RULES

- 90 minutes.
- 30 minutes of extra-time if necessary.
- Penalty shoot-out if scores still level.
- Seven named substitutes
- Maximum of 3 substitutions.

Tavriya Simferopol qualified for 1992–93 European Cup Preliminary round and Dynamo Kyiv qualified for 1992–93 UEFA Cup First round.

=== Third place playoff ===
June 20, 1992

Dnipro Dnipropetrovsk	3 – 2	Shakhtar Donetsk
Tyshchenko 19'; Konovalov 38', 74'	Report	Bielichenko 51'; Atelkin 80'

Metalurh Stadium, Zaporizhzhia
Attendance: 3,000
Referee: Tukhovsky (Simferopol)

== Season statistics ==
=== Top scorers ===
Rank	Player	Club	Goals (Pen.)
1	(Ukraine) Yuriy Hudymenko	Tavriya Simferopol	12
2	(Ukraine) Timerlan Huseinov	Zorya-MALS Luhansk	11
3	(Ukraine) Serhii Rebrov	Shakhtar Donetsk	10
3	(Ukraine) Ivan Hetsko	Chornomorets Odesa	10 (6)
5	(Ukraine) Oleksandr Zayats	Torpedo Zaporizhzhia	9 (3)
6	(Ukraine) Serhiy Shevchenko	Tavriya Simferopol	8 (2)
7	(Ukraine) Yuriy Hrytsyna	Dynamo Kyiv	7
7	(Ukraine) Ivan Korponay	Kremin Kremenchuk	7
7	(Ukraine) Serhiy Husyev	Chornomorets Odesa	7 (1)
7	(Ukraine) Oleh Salenko	Dynamo Kyiv	7 (3)

=== Clean sheets ===
Rank	Player	Club	Clean sheets
1	(Ukraine) Dmytro Shutkov	Shakhtar Donetsk	11
1	(Ukraine) Oleh Kolesov	Tavriya Simferopol	11
3	(Ukraine) Ihor Moiseyev	Torpedo Zaporizhia	8
3	(Ukraine) Oleksandr Pomazun	Metalist Kharkiv	8
3	(Ukraine) Anatoliy Chystov	Nyva Ternopil	8
3	(Ukraine) Mykhailo Burch	Volyn Lutsk	8

=== Hat-tricks ===
Player	For	Against	Result	Date
(Ukraine) Ivan Hetsko	Chornomorets Odesa	Nyva Vinnytsia	6–0	4 April 1992
(Ukraine) Pavlo Shkapenko	Metalurh Zaporizhya	Nyva Vinnytsia	4–1	28 April 1992
(Ukraine) Serhii Rebrov	Shakhtar Donetsk	Evis Mykolaiv	1–6	3 June 1992
(Ukraine) Yuriy Hudymenko*	Tavriya Simferopol	Temp Shepetivka	6–0	9 June 1992
(Ukraine) Yuriy Hrytsyna	Dynamo Kyiv	Naftovyk Okhtyrka	1–3	17 June 1992

Notes:

- (*) Asterisk identifies players who scored four goals (poker).

== Medal squads ==
(league appearances and goals listed in brackets)

1. SC Tavria Simferopol
Goalkeepers: Oleh Kolesov (19 / -9), (Russia) Dmitriy Gulenkov (1).

Defenders: Mykola Turchynenko (19), Oleksandr Holovko (18), Ihor Volkov (17 / 1), (Lithuania) Vidmantas Vyšniauskas (15), (Russia) Yuriy Getikov (14), Sefer Alibayev (9), Serhiy Voronezhsky (7), (Russia) Dmitriy Smirnov (5).
Midfielders: Andriy Oparin (19 / 1), Vladislav Novikov (18 / 1), Yuriy Mikhailus (2), Oleksandr Kundenok (2), Serhiy Yesin (1).
Forwards: (Russia) Sergei Gladyshev (19 / 6), Yuriy Hudymenko (18 / 12), Serhiy Shevchenko (18 / 8), (Uzbekistan) Sergey Andreev (15 / 2), Toliat Sheykhametov (7), (Russia) Marat Mulashev (2).

Manager: Anatoliy Zayayev.

Transferred out during the season: Marat Mulashev (to (Russia) Rubin Kazan), Oleksandr Kundenok (to Polissya Zhytomyr).

2. FC Dynamo Kyiv
Goalkeepers: (Lithuania) Valdemaras Martinkėnas (10 / -7), Ihor Kutepov (9 / -7).

Defenders: Andriy Annenkov (17), Serhiy Zayets (15 / 1), Anatoliy Bezsmertny (14), Oleh Luzhnyi (13 / 2), Serhiy Shmatovalenko (9), Akhrik Tsveyba (9), (Lithuania) Gintaras Kvitkauskas (6), (Armenia) Ervand Sukiasian (5 / 2), (Russia) Andrey Aleksanenkov (2).
Midfielders: Volodymyr Sharan (19 / 2), Yuriy Moroz (19), Stepan Betsa (14 / 1), Pavlo Yakovenko (12 / 1), Oleh Volotek (11 / 2), Serhiy Kovalets (12 / 1).
Forwards: Oleh Salenko (16 / 7), Yuriy Hritsyna (13 / 7), Oleh Matveyev (10 / 1), (Russia) Valeriy Yesipov (6), Viktor Leonenko (5 / 3).

Manager: Anatoliy Puzach.

Transferred out during the season: ?.

3. FC Dnipro Dnipropetrovsk
Goalkeepers: Valeriy Horodov (19 / -17), Mykola Medin.

Defenders: Serhiy Diriavka (17), Volodymyr Horily (17), Volodymyr Bahmut (14 / 3), Serhiy Bezhenar (9 / 2), Serhiy Mamchur (9), Andriy Yudin (8).
Midfielders: Andriy Polunin (17 / 2), (Russia) Oleksandr Zakharov (17 / 2), Yevhen Pokhlebayev (16), Oleksiy Sasko (16), Yuriy Maksymov (14 / 3), Vadym Tyshchenko (13 / 2), Dmytro Mykhailenko (1), Oleksandr Omelchuk (1).
Forwards: Valentyn Moskvin (19 / 3), Serhiy Konovalov (14 / 5), Serhiy Dumenko (7 / 4), Oleksandr Palianytsia (7 / 1), (Russia) Vladimir Lebed (7 / 1), Oleksandr Tiehayev (2).

Manager: Yevhen Kucherevsky (until March 15 (3 games)), Mykola Pavlov (since March 15 (15 games)).

Transferred out during the season: (Russia) Vladimir Lebed (to Krystal Kherson).

Note: Players in italic are whose playing position is uncertain.

== See also ==
- Ukrainian First League 1992
- 1992 Ukrainian Transitional League
- Ukrainian Cup 1992
