= 1991 Cup of the Ukrainian SSR =

Kubok Ukrainy

Tournament details
- Country: Ukrainian SSR
- Teams: 26

Final positions
- Champions: Temp Shepetivka
- Runners-up: Veres Rivne

Tournament statistics
- Matches played: 48
- Goals scored: 136 (2.83 per match)

The Ukrainian Cup 1991 was the 26th and the last annual edition of the Ukrainian SSR football knockout competition, known as the Ukrainian Cup. The competition started on March 30, 1991, and its final took place on November 24, 1991. It was a second edition of the tournament since its revival in 1990. The last year cup holder Polissia Zhytomyr was knocked out of the competition by Kryvbas Kryvyi Rih already in the second round.

The cup winner Temp Shepetivka was allowed to qualify for the 1992 Vyshcha Liha (Top League).

== Teams ==
=== Tournament distribution ===
The competition was conducted by the clubs of 1991 Soviet Lower Second League, Zone 1 only.

First round (20 teams)	20 entrants from the Lower Second League (Zone 1)	
Second round (16 teams)	6 entrants from the Lower Second League (Zone 1)	10 winners from the First round

=== Other professional teams ===
Many Ukrainian professional teams (19) in higher tiers of the Soviet football league pyramid did not take part in the competition.

- 1991 Soviet Top League (6): FC Chornomorets Odesa, FC Dynamo Kyiv, FC Dnipro Dnipropetrovsk, FC Metalist Kharkiv, FC Metalurh Zaporizhia, FC Shakhtar Donetsk
- 1991 Soviet First League (2): FC Bukovyna Chernivtsi, SC Tavriya Simferopol
- 1991 Soviet Second League (11): FC Halychyna Drohobych, FC Karpaty Lviv, FC Kremin Kremenchuk, FC Nyva Ternopil, FC Nyva Vinnytsia, SKA Odessa, FC Sudnobudivnyk Mykolaiv, FC Torpedo Zaporizhia, FC Volyn Lutsk, FC Vorskla Poltava, FC Zorya Luhansk

== Competition schedule ==
=== First round (1/16) ===
The first legs were played on 30 March, and the second legs were played on 2 April 1991.

Team 1	Agg.	Team 2	1st leg	2nd leg
SKA Kiev	3–4	Okean Kerch	2–4	1–0
Vahonobudivnyk Stakhanov	1–0	Podillia Khmelnytsky	0–0	1–0
Kryvbas Kryvyi Rih	3–2	Khimik Severodonetsk	1–2	2–0
Polissya Zhytomyr	6–3	Krystal Kherson	5–1	1–3
Dynamo Bila Tserkva	2–6	Prykarpattia Ivano-Frankivsk	0–2	2–4
Stal Kommunarsk	2–3	Zirka Kirovohrad	0–2	2–1
Mayak Ochakiv	1–6	Naftovyk Okhtyrka	1–1	0–5
Mayak Kharkiv	2–3	Dnipro Cherkasy	1–0	1–3
Zakarpattia Uzhhorod	2–0	Shakhtar Pavlohrad	0–0	2–0
Kolos Nikopol	1–2	Desna Chernihiv	1–1	0–1

Notes

The following clubs received bye for the next round: Veres Rivne, Chaika Sevastopol, Karpaty Kamyanka-Buzka, Pryladyst Mukacheve, FC Temp Shepetivka, Avtomobilist Sumy.

=== Second round ===
The first legs were played on 29 April, and the second legs were played on 28 June 1991.

Team 1	Agg.	Team 2	1st leg	2nd leg
Karpaty Kamyanka-Buzka	w/o	Okean Kerch	—	—
Polissia Zhytomyr	2–3	Kryvbas Kryvyi Rih	2–1	0–2
Veres Rivne	6–2	Chaika Sevastopol	2–1	4–1
Desna Chernihiv	7–1	Vahonobudivnyk Stakhanov	5–1	2–0
Prykarpattia Ivano-Frankivsk	3–4	Zirka Kirovohrad	1–3	2–1
Naftovyk Okhtyrka	5–2	Dnipro Cherkasy	3–1	2–1
Zakarpattia Uzhhorod	6–3	Pryladyst Mukacheve	2–2	4–1
Temp Shepetivka	2–1	Avtomobilist Sumy	0–1	2–0

Notes

1. The game between Kryvbas and Polissya took place on July 7.

=== Quarterfinals ===
The first legs were played on 24 July, and the second legs were played on 17 September 1991.

Team 1	Agg.	Team 2	1st leg	2nd leg
Desna Chernihiv	1–1 (a.e.t.)	Kryvbas Kryvyi Rih	1–1	0–0
Okean Kerch	0–4	Veres Rivne	0–3	0–1
Zirka Kirovohrad	2–4	Naftovyk Okhtyrka	2–3	0–1
Temp Shepetivka	4–3	Zakarpattia Uzhhorod	4–2	0–1

Notes

1. The game between Desna and Kryvbas took place on July 22.

=== Semifinals ===
The first legs were played on 16 November, and the second legs were played on 20 November 1991.

Team 1	Agg.	Team 2	1st leg	2nd leg
Naftovyk Okhtyrka	3–4	Temp Shepetivka	2–1	1–3
Kryvbas Kryvyi Rih	3–5	Veres Rivne	3–0	0–5

=== Final ===
The first leg was played on 24 November, and the second leg was played on 28 November 1991.

Team 1	Agg.	Team 2	1st leg	2nd leg
Veres Rivne	2–3	Temp Shepetivka	1–2	1–1

==== First leg ====
24 November 1991

Veres Rivne	1–2	Temp Shepetivka
Sarnavsky 22'		Dovhalets 31'; Bondarenko 31'

Avanhard Stadium, Rivne
Attendance: 4,277
Referee: Vadym Shevchenko (Kiev)

==== Second leg ====
28 November 1991

Temp Shepetivka	1–1	Veres Rivne
Bondarenko 57'		Mankuta 29'

Sport Complex Podillya, Khmelnytskyi
Attendance: 4,500
Referee: Valeriy Onufer (Uzhhorod)

Temp won 3–2 on aggregate
