= Hromov =

Hromov is a surname. Notable people with the surname include:

- Artem Hromov (born 1990), Ukrainian footballer
- Viktor Hromov (born 1965), Ukrainian footballer
- Oleksii Hromov, Deputy Chief of Main Operational Directorate of General Staff of Armed Forces of Ukraine
