= Ishtvan Sekech =

Ukrainian football player (1939–2019)

Personal information
- Birth name: István Szekecs
- Date of birth: 3 December 1939
- Place of birth: Beregszász, Kingdom of Hungary (present-day Berehove, Ukraine)
- Date of death: 28 January 2019 (aged 79)
- Height: 1.78 m (5 ft 10 in)
- Position: Forward

Senior career*
Years	Team	Apps	(Gls)
1954–1956	Kolkhoznik Beregovo		
1957	Kolhospnyk Rivne		
1958	Spartak Uzhhorod	19	(5)
1959	Dynamo Kyiv	2	(0)
1960–1962	Avanhard Ternopil	80	(36)
1962–1963	Avanhard Kharkiv	43	(5)
1964–1965	SKA Lviv	33	(10)
1965	SKA Odessa	27	(10)
1966	CSKA Moscow	34	(11)
1967–1972	Chornomorets Odesa	147	(26)
1972	Sudostroitel Mykolaiv		(3)

Managerial career
- 1973–1978: Pamir Dushanbe
- 1978–1980: Karpaty Lviv
- 1980–1985: Pakhtakor
- 1986–1987: Podillya Khmelnytskyi
- 1988–1989: SKA Karpaty Lviv
- 1989–1990: Podillya Khmelnytskyi
- 1990–1992: Temp Shepetivka
- 1992–1993: Karpaty Mukacheve
- 1994–1995: Okean Nakhodka
- 1996: Luch Vladivostok
- 1997: Neftyanik Pokhvistnevo
- 1998–2000: Metallurg Krasnoyarsk
- 2001: Zhemchuzhina-Sochi
- 2003–2005: Regar-TadAZ Tursunzoda
- 2004: Tajikistan (consultant)
- 2005: Metallurg-Kuzbass Novokuznetsk (assistant)
- 2006: CSKA Pamir Dushanbe
- 2007: Andijon
- 2008: Mika
- 2013–2018: CSKA Pamir Dushanbe (football director)
- * Club domestic league appearances and goals

Ishtvan Sekech (born István Szekecs; 3 December 1939 – 28 January 2019) was a Ukrainian football player and coach of Hungarian ethnic background. As a player, Sekech appeared in 223 matches and scored 43 goals in the Soviet championships. He captained Chornomorets Odesa from 1969 to 1971. Following his retirement, he became a manager and led Pakhtakor from 1980 to 1985.

== Coaching record ==
Season Division	Club	Record W-D-L	Goals GF–GA	Standing	Notes
1992; Division 1	Temp	2-4-12	9-34	10/10	relegation
