= 1991 Soviet Lower Second League, Zone 1 =

Football Championship of Ukrainian SSR
- Season: 1991
- Champions: Naftovyk Okhtyrka
- Promoted: Naftovyk Okhtyrka, Prykarpattia Ivano-Frankivsk, Temp Shepetivka
- Relegated: Okean Kerch, Zirka Kirovohrad, Mayak Kharkiv
- Top goalscorer: 28 - Ihor Plotko (Kolos Nikopol)

1991 Football Championship of Ukrainian SSR was the last season of association football competition of the Ukrainian SSR, which was part of the Soviet Lower Second League. The competition was won for the first time by FC Naftovyk Okhtyrka.

== Teams ==
=== Map ===
Locations of teams in Lower Second League, Zone 1

=== Promoted teams ===
- Avtomobilist Sumy – Champion of the Fitness clubs competitions (KFK) finals, Zone 3 winner (debut)
- Mayak Ochakiv – Runner-up of the Fitness clubs competitions (KFK) finals, Zone 5 winner (debut)
- Stal Komunarsk – Participant of the Fitness clubs competitions (KFK) finals, Zone 4 winner (debut)
- Temp Shepetivka – Participant of the Fitness clubs competitions (KFK) finals, Zone 2 winner (debut)
- Vahonobudivnyk Stakhanov – Participant of the Fitness clubs competitions (KFK) finals, Zone 6 winner (debut)
- Karpaty Kamianka-Buzka – Participant of the Fitness clubs competitions (KFK) finals, Zone 1 winner (debut)
- Pryladyst Mukacheve – Runner-up of the Fitness clubs competitions (KFK), Zone 2 (returning to professional level after an absence of 21 seasons)
- Khimik Severodonetsk – Fourth-placed team of the Fitness clubs competitions (KFK) finals, Zone 4 (returning to professional level after an absence of 21 seasons)

=== Relegated teams ===
- Zakarpattia Uzhhorod – 20th place

=== Renamed teams ===
Prior to the start of the season Avanhard Rivne was renamed to Veres Rivne.

== Final standings ==
Pos	Team	Pld	W	D	L	GF	GA	GD	Pts	Promotion or relegation
1	Naftovyk Okhtyrka (C, P)	50	29	17	4	87	34	+53	75	Promoted
2	Prykarpattia Ivano-Frankivsk (P)	50	31	9	10	86	43	+43	71	Promoted
3	Kolos Nikopol	50	28	13	9	86	45	+41	69	
4	Veres Rivne	50	28	13	9	67	38	+29	69	
5	Pryladyst Mukachevo	50	24	14	12	67	42	+25	62	
6	Krystal Kherson	50	23	15	12	82	60	+22	61	
7	Dynamo Bila Tserkva	50	25	9	16	69	50	+19	59	
8	Avtomobilist Sumy	50	20	14	16	51	40	+11	54	
9	Temp Shepetivka (P)	50	19	15	16	64	53	+11	53	Promoted
10	Polissya Zhytomyr	50	22	7	21	64	66	−2	51	
11	Kryvbas Kryvyi Rih	50	19	13	18	75	64	+11	51	
12	Shakhtar Pavlohrad	50	19	12	19	84	66	+18	50	
13	Desna Chernihiv	50	20	9	21	59	59	0	49	
14	Podillya Khmelnytskyi	50	18	13	19	54	55	−1	49	
15	Zakarpattia Uzhhorod	50	20	8	22	59	64	−5	48	
16	Karpaty Kamyanka-Buzka	50	15	15	20	48	55	−7	45	
17	Stal Kommunarsk	50	15	15	20	58	73	−15	45	
18	Dnipro Cherkasy	50	17	10	23	47	59	−12	44	
19	Khimik Sievierodonetsk	50	15	13	22	52	70	−18	43	
20	Vahonobudivnyk Stakhanov	50	17	8	25	56	75	−19	42	
21	SKA Kyiv	50	11	20	19	48	60	−12	42	
22	Chaika Sevastopol	50	13	15	22	58	77	−19	41	
23	Mayak Ochakiv	50	15	10	25	51	76	−25	40	
24	Okean Kerch (R)	50	15	10	25	49	72	−23	40	Relegated
25	Zirka Kirovohrad (R)	50	12	13	25	55	90	−35	37	Relegated
26	Mayak Kharkiv (R)	50	0	10	40	31	121	−90	10	Relegated

(C) Champions; (P) Promoted; (R) Relegated

=== Top goalscorers ===
The following were the top ten goalscorers.

#	Scorer	Goals (Pen.)	Team
1	(Ukraine) Ihor Plotko	28	Kolos Nikopol
2	(Ukraine) Yuriy Maksymov	27	Krystal Kherson
3	(Ukraine) Roman Hryhorchuk	26	Prykarpattia Ivano-Frankivsk
3	(Ukraine) Viktor Hromov	26	Shakhtar Pavlohrad
5	(Ukraine) Volodymyr Trubnykov	25	Shakhtar Pavlohrad
6	(Ukraine) Mykhailo Zubchuk	22	Kryvbas Kryvyi Rih
6	(Ukraine) Volodymyr Kukhlevskyi	22	Pryladyst Mukacheve
8	(Ukraine) Anatoliy Lukashenko	18	Polissya Zhytomyr
8	(Ukraine) Yuriy Makarov	18	Dynamo Bila Tserkva
10	(Ukraine) Eduard Denysenko	17	Zirka Kirovohrad
10	(Ukraine) Petro Rusak	17	Prykarpattia Ivano-Frankivsk
10	(Ukraine) Volodymyr Tymchenko	17	Naftovyk Okhtyrka
10	(Ukraine) Borys Shurshyn	17	Naftovyk Okhtyrka

== Champions ==
Note: in parentheses are shown games played and goals scored (if any), in bold are indicated "home-grown" players

**Naftovyk Okhtyrka**

Goalkeepers: Yuriy Prokhorov (46), Valentyn Symakovych (23).

Defenders: Viktor Yayichnyk (49, 4), Viktor Popovych (48, 3), Serhiy Sukharev (48), **Anatoliy Yermak** (46, 3), Ihor Zadorozhnyi (45, 14), **Vasyl Yermak** (43).

Midfielders: Volodymyr Tymchenko (49, 17), Sergei Fomin (49, 5), Borys Shurshyn (49, 17), Serhiy Horokh (48, 7), Mykola Lypynskyi (48, 9), Ihor Yudanov (16), **Serhiy Lystopadov** (14).

Forwards: Pavlo Matviychenko (45, 7), Stanislav Starikov (3).

Head coach — Valeriy Dushkov, nachalnik komandy (team's chief) — Viktor Hodyryev, coaches — Valeriy Boyarchuk, Hennadiy Makarov.

Players who left team during the season: Vasyl Sarayev (MF, 0) → Avtomobilist Sumy, Igor Yermokhin (FW, 21, 1) → Torpedo Moscow, Viktor Rudyi (FW, 1) → Bukovyna Chernivtsi
