= Ivan Krasnetskyi =

Soviet and Ukrainian footballer

Personal information
- Full name: Ivan Krasnetskyi
- Date of birth: 27 December 1945
- Place of birth: Bratkivtsi, Stanislav Raion, Stanislav Oblast, Ukrainian SSR
- Date of death: 23 April 2010 (aged 64)
- Place of death: Ivano-Frankivsk, Ivano-Frankivsk Oblast, Ukraine
- Position: Goalkeeper

Senior career*
Years	Team	Apps	(Gls)
1964	FC Spartak Ivano-Frankivsk	?	(0)
1966–1967	SKA Lviv	2	(0)
1968–1971	FC Spartak Ivano-Frankivsk	31	(0)
1972	FC Frunzenets Sumy	?	(0)
1973	FC Budivelnyk Kalush	?	(0)

Managerial career
- 1976–1984: Sports school Ivano-Frankivsk
- 1987: FC Prykarpattya Ivano-Frankivsk (ass't)
- 1988–1990: FC Zakarpattia Uzhhorod
- 1990–1992: FC Prykarpattya Ivano-Frankivsk
- 1992–1993: FC Beskyd Nadvirna
- 1993: FC Krystal Chortkiv
- 1995: FC Veres Rivne
- 1997: FC Kalush
- 1998–1999: SC Mykolaiv
- 2001–2002: FC Chornohora Ivano-Frankivsk
- 2004: FC Tsementnyk Yamnytsia
- 2006–2010: Sports school Spartak-Prykarpattia
- * Club domestic league appearances and goals

Ivan Krasnetskyi (27 December 1945 – 23 April 2010) was a Soviet and Ukrainian football player and coach. He is the Distinguished professional of physical culture and sport of Ukraine.

== Coaching record ==
Season Division	Club	Record W-D-L	Goals GF–GA	Standing	Notes
1992; Division 1	Prykarpattya	2-4-4	3-8	9/10	replaced by Yuriy Shuliatytskyi
