= 1991 Soviet Second League, Zone West =

Second League
- Season: 1991
- Champions: Karpaty Lviv
- Promoted: cancelled
- Relegated: 4 teams (cancelled)
- Top goalscorer: (22) - Ihor Yavorsky (Nyva Ternopil)

1991 Soviet Second League, Zone West was the last season of association football competition of the Soviet Second League in the Zone West. The competition was won by FC Karpaty Lviv.

The group (zone) consisted predominantly out of Ukrainian clubs. With fall of the Soviet Union and discontinuation of Soviet competition, most clubs of the group joined their top national leagues. Because of the First Nagorno-Karabakh War (Operation Ring), many clubs refused to travel to Azerbaijan and were awarded technical losses.

== Teams ==
=== Promoted teams ===
==== Zone 1 (Ukraine) ====
- Torpedo Zaporizhzhia – Winner of the Lower Second League (Returning after a season)
- Sudnostroitel Nikoplayev – Runner-up of the Lower Second League (Returning after a season)

==== Zone 3 (Azerbaijan) ====
- Karabakh Agdam – Winner of the Lower Second League (Returning after a season)

==== Zone 4 ====
- Torpedo Taganrog – Winner of the Lower Second League (Returning after a season)

==== Zone 5 ====
- Tigina-Apoel Bendery – Runner-up of the Lower Second League (Returning after a season)

==== Zone 6 ====
- KIM Vitebsk – Runner-up of the Lower Second League (Returning after a season)

=== Transferred team from other zones ===
- Azerbaijani teams that in 1990 competed in Zone "Center" of the Second League moved to Zone "West", while Armenian teams were moved to their place.

=== Renamed teams ===
- Prior to the start of the season Kapaz Gandzha was renamed to Dinamo Gandzha.
- Prior to the start of the season Tigina Bendery was renamed to Tigina-Apoel Bendery.

== Final standings ==
Pos	Republic (Note: Numerous clubs refused to play away games in Azerbaijan due to the First Nagorno-Karabakh War (Operation Ring).)	Team	Pld	W	D	L	GF	GA	GD	Pts
1	(Ukrainian Soviet Socialist Republic) Ukraine	Karpaty Lviv	42	24	11	7	47	27	+20	59
2	(Ukrainian Soviet Socialist Republic) Ukraine	Zorya Luhansk (Note: Teams that refused to play against Goyazan Kazakh only: Zarya Luhansk and Niva Vinnitsa.)	42	26	5	11	69	34	+35	57
3	(Azerbaijan Soviet Socialist Republic) Azerbaijan	Dinamo Gandzha	42	26	4	12	48	48	0	56 (Note: All Azerbaijani clubs received multiple technical wins such: Dinamo Gandzha: 10 technical wins; +20 points; Karabakh Agdam: 11 technical wins; +22 points; Goyazan Kazakh: 4 technical wins; +8 points)
4	(Ukrainian Soviet Socialist Republic) Ukraine	Nyva Ternopil (Note: Teams that refused to play against Dinamo Gandzha and Karabakh Agdam: Nyva Ternopil, Volyn Lutsk, Tigina-Apoel Bendery, SKA Odesa, Dnepr Mogilev, Kremen Kremenchug, Sudnostroitel Nikolayev, Dinamo Brest, KIM Vitebsk, and Khimik Grodno.)	42	25	6	11	56	29	+27	56
5	(Ukrainian Soviet Socialist Republic) Ukraine	Nyva Vinnytsia	42	21	7	14	54	40	+14	49
6	(Russian Soviet Federative Socialist Republic) Russia (1W)	Torpedo Taganrog	42	19	9	14	46	30	+16	47
7	(Ukrainian Soviet Socialist Republic) Ukraine	Torpedo Zaporizhzhia	42	18	10	14	63	50	+13	46
8	(Ukrainian Soviet Socialist Republic) Ukraine	Volyn Lutsk	42	19	7	16	46	33	+13	45
9	(Moldavian Soviet Socialist Republic) Moldova	Tigina-Apoel Bendery	42	18	8	16	49	39	+10	44
10	(Ukrainian Soviet Socialist Republic) Ukraine	SKA Odesa	42	18	7	17	46	42	+4	43
11	(Azerbaijan Soviet Socialist Republic) Azerbaijan	Karabakh Agdam	42	20	2	20	20	47	−27	42
12	(Byelorussian Soviet Socialist Republic) Belarus	Dnepr Mogilev (Note: Teams that refused to play against all Azerbaijani clubs: Dnepr Mogilev and KIM Vitebsk.)	42	18	6	18	47	37	+10	42
13	(Ukrainian Soviet Socialist Republic) Ukraine	Kremin Kremenchuk	42	16	9	17	56	50	+6	41
14	(Moldavian Soviet Socialist Republic) Moldova	Zaria Beltsy	42	16	7	19	63	82	−19	39
15	(Ukrainian Soviet Socialist Republic) Ukraine	Sudnobudivnyk Mykolaiv	42	15	8	19	61	55	+6	38
16	(Byelorussian Soviet Socialist Republic) Belarus	Dinamo Brest	42	14	9	19	50	50	0	37
17	(Russian Soviet Federative Socialist Republic) Russia (1W)	Spartak Nalchik	42	15	6	21	51	67	−16	36
18	(Ukrainian Soviet Socialist Republic) Ukraine(1)	Halychyna Drohobych	42	14	7	21	42	66	−24	35
19	(Ukrainian Soviet Socialist Republic) Ukraine(1)	Vorskla Poltava	42	10	11	21	39	60	−21	31
20	(Byelorussian Soviet Socialist Republic) Belarus	KIM Vitebsk	42	11	8	23	43	55	−12	30
21	(Azerbaijan Soviet Socialist Republic) Azerbaijan	Goyazan Kazakh	42	13	2	27	29	61	−32	28
22	(Byelorussian Soviet Socialist Republic) Belarus	Khimik Grodno	42	7	9	26	32	55	−23	23

=== Representation by republic ===
- Ukrainian SSR: 11
- Byelorussian SSR: 4
- Moldavian SSR 2
- Russian SFSR 2
- Azerbaijan SSR 3

== Top goalscorers ==
The following were the top ten goalscorers.

#	Scorer	Goals (Pen.)	Team
1	Ihor Yavorsky	22	Nyva Ternopil
2	Yuriy Horyachev	19	Sudobudivnyk Mykolaiv
2	Oleksandr Sevidov	19	Zorya Luhansk
4	Viktor Sakhno	18	Zaria Balti
5	Vitaliy Parakhnevych	16	SKA Odesa
6	Oleh Volotek	15	Zorya Luhansk
6	Aleksandr Gridyushko	15	KIM Vitebsk
6	Ivan Shariy	15	Nyva Vinnytsia
9	Volodymyr Mozolyuk	14	Volyn Lutsk
9	Sergei Muradyan	14	Kremin Kremenchuk
9	Oleg Radushko	14	Dnepr Mogilev
