= FC Yalos Yalta =

- Full name: FC Yalos Yalta
- Founded: 2005
- Dissolved: 2006
- Ground: "Avanhard", Yalta
- League: Druha Liha B
- 2005–06: 4th

FC Yalos Yalta was a Ukrainian football club based in Yalta, Crimea.

The club was founded in 2005 by Anatoliy Zayayev and belonged to AOZT FC Tavria. The name Yalos is the old name of Yalta, when it was a Greek colony. AOZT FC Tavria had connections with the local criminal ring known as "Bashmaky", to which belonged its president, Viktor Karasev.

Yalos competed in the Druha Liha for a season. After the 2005–06 season, the club didn't submit a license and elected to remove themselves from the PFL. In the summer of 2006, the Ukrainian militsiya (MVS) detained Viktor Karasev and was looking for the sports director of SC Tavriya Simferopol. In March 2007, the Simferopol Kyiv District court convicted Karasev of arson and sentenced him to 7 years in jail. In 2024 Karasev became a vice-president of the Republic of Crimea Wrestling Federation.

Anatoliy Zayayev stood in opposition of Serhiy Kunitsyn and wanted for Valeriy Avdysh to lead football in Crimea.

== League and cup history (Ukraine) ==
| Season | Div. | Pos. | Pl. | W | D | L | GS | GA | P | Domestic Cup | Europe | Notes |
|---|---|---|---|---|---|---|---|---|---|---|---|---|
| 2005–06 | 3rd "B" | 4 | 28 | 12 | 7 | 9 | 28 | 27 | 43 | 1/16 finals | | Withdrew |

== See also ==
- FC Komunalnyk Luhansk, a short term team
- FC Feniks-Illichovets Kalinine
