= Vadym Tyshchenko =

Soviet-Ukrainian footballer and coach (1963–2015)

Vadym Tyshchenko Вадим Тищенко
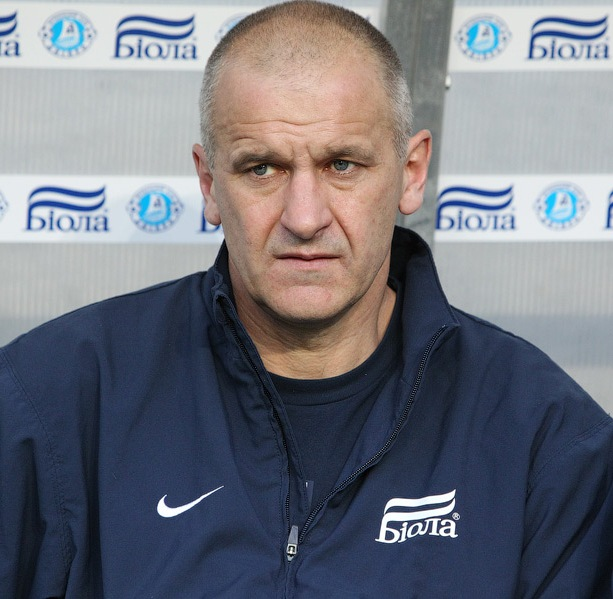
- Tyshchenko in 2010

Personal information
- Full name: Vadym Mykolayovych Tyschenko
- Date of birth: 24 March 1963
- Place of birth: Horodok, Ukrainian SSR
- Date of death: 14 December 2015 (aged 52)
- Height: 1.86 m (6 ft 1 in)
- Position: Midfielder

Youth career
- Lviv sports school

Senior career*
Years	Team	Apps	(Gls)
1981–1983	Nyva Vynnitsia		
1984	Dynamo Kyiv	0	(0)
1985–1986	SKA Karpaty Lviv	77	(11)
1987–1992	FC Dnipro Dnipropetrovsk	109	(15)
1992–1994	Hapoel Haifa F.C.	53	(4)

International career
1986–1988	USSR (Olympic)	4	(0)
1987, 1990	USSR	8	(0)

Managerial career
- 1996–1997: FC Dnipro Dnipropetrovsk (assistant)
- 1998: FC Dnipro Dnipropetrovsk
- 1999: FC Kryvbas-2 Kryvyi Rih
- 2000–2001: FC Kryvbas Kryvyi Rih (assistant)
- 2001–2015: FC Dnipro Dnipropetrovsk (assistant)
- 2005: FC Dnipro Dnipropetrovsk (caretaker)
- 2010: FC Dnipro Dnipropetrovsk (caretaker)
Medal record
Representing the Soviet Union
Men's football
Gold medal – first place	1988 Seoul	Team
- * Club domestic league appearances and goals

Vadym Mykolayovych Tyshchenko or Vadim Nikolayevich Tishchenko (Ukrainian: Вадим Миколайович Тищенко; 24 March 1963 – 14 December 2015) was a Soviet and Ukrainian association football player and Ukrainian coach.

== Biography ==
Tyshchenko was born on 24 March 1963 in a small city of Horodok near Lviv in a family of Mykola Romanovych Tyshchenko from Sumy Oblast. When Vadym was 12, he moved to Lviv and enrolled in the Lviv sports boarding school (today Lviv Sports College). His first football coach was Fred Bushansky. Among his classmantes was Bohdan Samardak and many others. In the tenth grade Tyshchenko joined Komsomol of Ukraine. He graduated the boarding school back 1981 and soon appeared in Vinnytsia playing for the Second League team Nyva Vinnytsia that was coached by Yukhym Shkolnykov.

In 1983 Nyva placed fifth in the Second League and Tyshchenko was approached by scouts of Dynamo Kyiv and joined the big club. In 1984 together with the team he visited the United States and got a $40 hair cut. Tyshchenko did not stayed in the club for long and after a year ran away. In 1985 as part of military obligation, he joined SKA Karpaty Lviv that played in the Soviet First League. Tyshchenko played for the club two full seasons in 77 games scoring 11 goals.

Finally, in 1987 Kucherevsky, who noticed Tyshchenko when he played for Nyva, invited him to Dnipro Dnipropetrovsk. In 1988 Tyshchenko became a champion of the Soviet Union playing for Dnipro. Yet already since 1987 Lobanovsky started to invite him for the Soviet Union national football team. Tyshchenko however most of his time dedicated to the Soviet Union Olympic football team that won gold medals in Seoul. He did not play a single game in finals, but also received the Olympic gold medal. Tyshchenko had to miss most of the 1988 Soviet Top League season and the 1988 European Championship (where Soviet team lost in the final) due to his injury of meniscus that he received on 12 March 1988 playing against Metalist Kharkiv. He was hospitalized to one of Moscow's hospitals. Tyshchenko however returned to Dnipro Dnipropetrovsk in 1989 and that season the club won the Soviet Cup. He also was a candidate for the national team, but later did not make list for the finals in Italy (1990 FIFA World Cup).

Tyshchenko stayed with Dnipro for another couple of years during which the Soviet Union fell apart and Vadym started to play in the Higher League of Ukraine where Dnipro won bronze medals against Shakhtar Donetsk. In 1992 along with Volodymyr Horilyi, he joined Hapoel Haifa F.C. in Israel where he played another two season. Tyshchenko retired in 1994 after he was hospitalized again due to another foot injury already in Israel. During the hospitalization he experienced several surgeries during which had his hip and knee joints replaced.

In summer of 1996 Tyshchenko returned to Dnipro where he was an assistant of Vyacheslav Hroznyi. Since then with insignificant pauses, he stayed in the club for some 15 years as coaching staff.

=== Family ===
Tyshchenko was married for 27 years to his wife Svitlana. He was also survived by his daughter Kateryna and son Serhii.

== Honours ==
- Olympic champion: 1988 (he was in the squad for the tournament, but did not play in any games)
- Soviet Top League winner: 1988
- Soviet Top League runner-up: 1987, 1990
- Ukrainian Premier League bronze: 1992
- Soviet Cup winner: 1989
- Top-33 players year-end list: twice

== International career ==
Tyshchenko made his debut for USSR on 29 August 1987 in a friendly against Yugoslavia. He played in UEFA Euro 1988 qualifiers, but was not selected for the squad for that tournament or for the 1990 FIFA World Cup.
