= Yuri Getikov =

Russian footballer

Personal information
- Full name: Yuri Alekseyevich Getikov
- Date of birth: 19 June 1971 (age 55)
- Place of birth: Gomel Region, Belarus SSR
- Height: 1.79 m (5 ft 10 1/2 in)
- Positions: Defender; forward; midfielder

Youth career
- FC Shinnik Omsk

Senior career*
Years	Team	Apps	(Gls)
1988–1991	FC Irtysh Omsk	106	(14)
1992–1993	Tavriya Simferopol	28	(0)
1993–1994	FC Baltika Kaliningrad	61	(2)
1994	→ FC Baltika-2 Kaliningrad (loan)	6	(4)
1994	Temp Shepetivka	7	(0)
1995	Tavriya Simferopol	7	(0)
1995–1997	FC Irtysh Omsk	70	(7)
1998	FC Krylia Sovetov Samara	8	(0)
1999–2001	FC Gazovik-Gazprom Izhevsk	95	(16)
2002	FC Irtysh Omsk	30	(7)
2003	FC Dynamo Stavropol	16	(0)
2004	FC Metallurg-Kuzbass Novokuznetsk	13	(0)

Managerial career
- 2012: FC Irtysh Omsk (reserves assistant)
- 2013–2014: SC Tavriya Simferopol (youth)
- 2014: FC TSK Simferopol (assistant)
- 2014–2015: DYuSSh RK Simferopol
- 2015: FC Kentavr Dzhankoy
- 2015–2016: FC Berkut Armiansk
- 2016–2017: FC TSK Simferopol (assistant)
- 2017: FC Dynamo Stavropol (assistant)
Medal record
SC Tavriya Simferopol
Winner	Ukrainian Top League	1992
FC Baltika Kaliningrad
Third place	Russian First Division	1994
- * Club domestic league appearances and goals

Yuri Alekseyevich Getikov (Russian: Юрий Алексеевич Гетиков; born 19 June 1971) is a Russian football coach and a former player.

== Honours ==
Tavriya Simferopol

- Ukrainian Premier League: 1992
