= Anatoliy Chystov =

Ukrainian footballer (born 1962)

Personal information
- Full name: Anatoliy Volodymyrovych Chystov
- Date of birth: 27 May 1962 (age 64)
- Place of birth: Simferopol, Ukrainian SSR
- Height: 1.90 m (6 ft 3 in)
- Position: Goalkeeper

Youth career
- Tavriya Simferopol

Senior career*
| Years | Team | Apps | (Gls) |
| 1978 | FC Shtorm Odesa | 0 | (0) |
| 1980–1986 | FC Chornomorets Odesa | 17 | (0) |
| 1987–1988 | FC Nistru Kishinev | 75 | (0) |
| 1989 | FC Bukovyna Chernivtsi | 51 | (0) |
| 1990–1991 | CS Tiligul-Tiras Tiraspol | 64 | (0) |
| 1992 | FC Nyva Ternopil | 14 | (0) |
| 1992 | FC Kryvbas Kryvyi Rih | 10 | (0) |
| 1993 | FC Dnipro Dnipropetrovsk | 1 | (0) |
| 1993–1996 | Äppelbo AIK | | (0) |
| 1997 | FC SKA-Lotto Odesa | 28 | (0) |
| 1998–1999 | SC Odesa | 37 | (0) |
| 1999–2000 | FC Chornomorets Odesa | 14 | (0) |
| 1999–2000 | → FC Chornomorets-2 Odesa (loan) | 14 | (0) |
- * Club domestic league appearances and goals

Anatoliy Volodymyrovych Chystov (Ukrainian: Анатолій Володимирович Чистов; born 27 May 1962) is a former Ukrainian football player.

== Honours ==
Tiligul Tiraspol

- Soviet First League runner-up: 1991

Dnipro

- Ukrainian Premier League runner-up: 1992–93
