= Oleh Kolesov =

Ukrainian association football coach and former player

Personal information
- Full name: Oleh Anatoliyovych Kolesov
- Date of birth: 15 February 1969 (age 57)
- Place of birth: Dnipropetrovsk, Ukrainian SSR, Soviet Union
- Position: Goalkeeper

Team information
- Current team: FC Krymteplytsia Molodizhne

Youth career
- 1983–1985: FC Dnipro-75 Dnipropetrovsk
- 1985–1989: Dnipro-d Dnipropetrovsk

Senior career*
Years	Team	Apps	(Gls)
1988–1991	FC Shakhtar Pavlohrad		
1989	SKA Odesa		
1992–1993	SC Tavriya Simferopol		
1993–1995	FC Temp Shepetivka		
1995–1997	FC Torpedo Zaporizhia		
1997–1998	FC Metalurh Zaporizhia		
1998–1999	FC Metalist Kharkiv		
1998–1999	FC Metalist-2 Kharkiv		
2001	FC Polissya Zhytomyr		
2002	MFC Mykolaiv		
2002–2003	FC Vorskla Poltava		
2002–2003	FC Vorskla-2 Poltava		
2003	FC Stal Dniprodzerzhynsk		

Managerial career
- 2003–2011: SC Tavriya Simferopol (staff)
- 2011: SC Tavriya Simferopol (U21)
- 2012: FC Krymteplytsia Molodizhne (goalies)
- 2012–2013: SC Tavriya Simferopol (U19, goalies)
- 2013: SC Tavriya Simferopol (goalies)
- 2014–2015: FC Metalurh Donetsk (U21)
- 2015–2016: FC Stal Dniprodzerzhynsk (U21, goalies)
- 2016–2017: FC Ternopil (goalies)
- 2017: FC Poltava (goalies)
- 2018: FC Rubin Yalta (assistant)
- 2018: FC Inkomsport Yalta
- 2019: FC Krymteplytsia Molodizhne
- * Club domestic league appearances and goals

Oleh Anatoliyovych Kolesov (Ukrainian: Олег Анатолійович Колесов; Russian: Олег Анатольевич Колесов; born 15 February 1969) is a Ukrainian professional football coach and a former goalkeeper. He is the Master of Sports of Ukraine.

In February 2019 he was appointed a head coach of FC Krymteplytsia Molodizhne from the Crimean Premier League.

== Honours ==
Tavriya Simferopol

- Ukrainian Premier League champion: 1992.
