= FC Ahrotekhservis Sumy =

- Full name: FC Ahrotekhservis Sumy
- Founded: 1965
- Dissolved: 1996
- Ground: Avanhard Stadium, Sumy
- Capacity: 25,830
- League: Druha Liha
- 1995–96: 18th

FC Ahrotekhservis Sumy (Ukrainian: Футбольний Клуб "Агротехсервіс" Суми) was the Ukrainian football club based in Sumy, Ukraine.

== Previous names of the club ==
1965–1993 – Avtomobilist Sumy (Ukrainian: "Автомобіліст" Суми)
1993–1994 – SBTS Sumy (Ukrainian: СБТС Суми)
1995 – Football Club Sumy (Ukrainian: Футбольний Клуб "Суми")
1996 – Football Club Ahrotekhservis Sumy (Ukrainian: Футбольний Клуб "Агротехсервіс" Суми)

== Quick history ==
The club was established at the Sumy automobile enterprise No.18021 in 1965 as Automobilist.

In 1990, Avtomobilist was granted the status of a team of masters (Soviet equivalent of a professional team), returning professional football to the city of Sumy. The team entered the All-Union competition in the 1991 Soviet Lower Second League, Zone 1. The new team of masters was coached by former Dynamo Kyiv defender Mykhailo Fomenko. Fomenko replaced Mykola Kurasov. Avtomobilist placed 8th among 26 participants. The competition was won by another team from the Sumy Oblast, Naftovyk Okhtyrka. Avtomobilist played their games at the Stadion Kolos, which belonged to the Sumy Agrarian University. In the 1992–93 season, Avtomobilist began at the Stadion Avanhard.

In 1994, the club changed its name to SBTS. For a single season in 1994–95, the team was simply named as FC Sumy. The next season it changed their name to Ahrotekhservis. In 1996, Ahrotekhservis was dissolved due to lack of funds.

== See also ==
- FC Frunzenets Sumy
- FC Spartak Sumy
- FC Yavir Krasnopilya
