= Yuriy Mikhaylus =

Soviet and Ukrainian footballer

Personal information
- Full name: Yuriy Ivanovich Mikhaylus
- Date of birth: 17 June 1964 (age 62)
- Place of birth: Russian SFSR
- Position: Midfielder

Senior career*
Years	Team	Apps	(Gls)
1992–1993	SC Tavriya Simferopol	2	(0)
1993–1994	FC Surozh Sudak	32	(5)
Medal record
SC Tavriya Simferopol
Winner	Ukrainian Top League	1992
- * Club domestic league appearances and goals

Yuriy Ivanovich Mikhaylus (Russian: Юрий Иванович Михайлус; born 17 June 1964) is a former Soviet and Ukrainian footballer, the champion of Ukraine with SC Tavriya Simferopol.
