= Serhiy Shevchenko (footballer, born May 1960) =

Sergei Shevchenko
Personal information
- Full name: Sergei Yakovlevich Shevchenko
- Date of birth: 15 May 1960 (age 66)
- Place of birth: Kalininskoe, Kyrgyzstan, Soviet Union
- Height: 1.82 m (6 ft 0 in)
- Position: Midfielder

Team information
- Current team: TSK Simferopol (technical sports director)

Senior career*
Years	Team	Apps	(Gls)
1978–1982	Alga Frunze	36	(4)
1983	Alai Osh	?	(?)
1984–1985	Neftchi Farg'ona	?	(?)
1986–1993	Tavriya Simferopol	180	(71)
1993–1994	Metalist Kharkiv	14	(2)

Managerial career
- 1995–1996: Avanhard Kramatorsk
- 1996: Tavriya Simferopol
- 1997–1999: Andijan
- 2000–2002: Qizilqum Zarafshon
- 2003: Ordabasy Chimkent
- 2004: Qizilqum Zarafshon
- 2005–2006: Kryvbas-2
- 2006–2009: Tytan Armyansk
- 2010: Khimik Krasnoperekopsk
- 2011–2013: Avanhard Kramatorsk
- 2014: Andijan
- 2016–2017: TSK Simferopol
- * Club domestic league appearances and goals

Sergei Yakovlevich Shevchenko (Kyrgyz: Сергей Яковлевич Шевченко; Russian: Сергей Яковлевич Шевченко; born on 15 May 1960), is a Kyrgyz former football coach and player who is the technical sports director FC TSK Simferopol.

== Playing career ==
Born in Kara-Balta, present day Kyrgyzstan, Shevchenko played in the Soviet football leagues before joining Tavriya Simferopol, where he would help the club win the first Ukrainian Premier League title in 1992.

== Managerial career ==
Shevchenko started his managerial career at amateur club Avanhard Kramatorsk who won the championship of Donetsk oblast in 1995. In 1996, he was appointed as head coach of Tavriya Simferopol. In 1997–1999 he was coach of FK Andijan and 2000–2002 of Qizilqum Zarafshon. With Qizilqum Zarafshon he won the bronze medals of the 2002 Uzbek League.

In 2011, he moved back to Avanhard Kramatorsk where he started his managing career. After finishing the 2011–12 Ukrainian Second League season his club gained promotion to the Ukrainian First League for the 2012–13 season. In his first season in the Ukrainian First League, Avanhard finished at 7th position.

On 15 July 2014, he signed a contract with FK Andijan where he worked in 1997–1999.

== Honours ==
=== Player ===
Tavriya Simferopol

- Ukrainian Premier League: 1992

=== Manager ===
Qizilqum

- Uzbek League third place: 2002

TSK Simferopol

- Crimean Premier League: 2016
