= Vidmantas Vyšniauskas =

Lithuanian footballer

Vidmantas Vysniauskas
Personal information
- Date of birth: 15 September 1969 (age 57)
- Place of birth: Lithuanian SSR
- Height: 1.87 m (6 ft 2 in)
- Position: Midfielder

Senior career*
Years	Team	Apps	(Gls)
1990–1993	Tavriya Simferopol	83	(5)
1993–1994	1. FC Markkleeberg	40	(4)
1994–1995	Union Berlin	20	(3)
1995–1998	FC Sachsen Leipzig	89	(10)
1998–2000	SV Wilhelmshaven	65	(11)
2000–2001	Sportfreunde Siegen	19	(3)
2001–2002	VfB Lübeck	33	(3)
2003–2004	SV Wilhelmshaven	46	(5)
2004–2005	FC Schüttorf 09		

International career
1992	Lithuania	2	(0)
Medal record
SC Tavriya Simferopol
Winner	Ukrainian Top League	1992
- * Club domestic league appearances and goals

Vidmantas Vysniauskas (born 15 September 1969) is a Lithuanian former professional footballer who played as a midfielder. As an international, he obtained a two caps for the Lithuania national team. Vysniauskas began his playing career in Ukraine in 1990 with SC Tavriya Simferopol. He moved to Germany in 1992 and played successively for 1. FC Markkleeberg, FC Sachsen Leipzig, SV Wilhelmshaven, Sportfreunde Siegen, VfB Lübeck and FC Schüttorf 09.

== Honours ==
Tavriya Simferopol

- Ukrainian Premier League: 1992

Lithuania

- Baltic Cup: 1992
