= Valdemaras Martinkėnas =

Lithuanian footballer and coach

Personal information
- Date of birth: 10 March 1965
- Place of birth: Krokialaukis, Lithuanian SSR, Soviet Union
- Date of death: 20 July 2004 (aged 39)
- Place of death: Nova Gorica, Slovenia
- Height: 1.83 m (6 ft 0 in)
- Position: Goalkeeper

Senior career*
Years	Team	Apps	(Gls)
1984–1987	FK Žalgiris Vilnius	0	(0)
1987–1988	FK Atlantas	37	(0)
1989–1991	FK Žalgiris Vilnius	67	(0)
1991–1993	Dynamo Kyiv	24	(0)
1993–1994	Dynamo-2 Kyiv	4	(0)
1994–1996	FC Wil		
1996	FC Haka	3	(0)
1996–1997	Lelle SK	1	(0)
1997	KAMAZ	19	(0)
1997–1999	Kareda Šiauliai		
2000	FC Kuressaare		

International career
1991–1997	Lithuania	19	(0)

Managerial career
- 1999: Kareda Šiauliai
- 2003–2004: FC Flora Tallinn (assistant)
- 2003–2004: Estonia (assistant)
Medal record
FK Žalgiris Vilnius
Third place	Baltic League	1990
Winner	A Lyga	1991
FC Dynamo Kyiv
Runner-up	Ukrainian Top League	1992
Winner	Ukrainian Top League	1992–93
- * Club domestic league appearances and goals

Valdemaras Martinkėnas (10 March 1965 – 20 July 2004) was a Soviet and Lithuanian professional footballer and coach.

== Career ==
Born in Krokialaukis, Martinkėnas was the goalkeeper for the Lithuanian national team in the years after independence from the USSR, appearing in most of the qualifying games for the 1994 World Cup. He won 19 caps for his country.

He also won the Lithuanian league championship with Zalgiris Vilnius in 1991, and starred in Dynamo Kyiv's 1992–93 Ukrainian league championship win. Later, he became goalkeeping coach to the Estonian national side.

Martinkėnas died at the age of 39 in Nova Gorica in Slovenia, drowning in a strong current after having gone for a swim in a mountain river. He was the goalkeeping coach of Flora Tallinn at the time, and was in Slovenia preparing for their Champions League qualifier against NK Gorica.

== Honours ==
- A Lyga champion: 1991.
- A Lyga bronze: 1990.
- Ukrainian Premier League champion: 1993.
- Ukrainian Premier League runner-up: 1992.

== European club competitions ==
- 1989–90 UEFA Cup with FK Žalgiris Vilnius: 4 games.
- 1990–91 European Cup with FC Dynamo Kyiv: 2 games.
