= Yuriy Hudymenko =

Ukrainian footballer

Personal information
- Full name: Yuriy Arkadiyovych Hudymenko
- Date of birth: 10 March 1966 (age 60)
- Place of birth: Frunze, Kyrgyz SSR
- Height: 1.87 m (6 ft 2 in)
- Position: Striker

Youth career
- RSSSOR (Note: Republican Specialized Sports School of Olympic Reserve) Frunze

Senior career*
Years	Team	Apps	(Gls)
1983	TsOR Frunze	4	(0)
1983–1989	FC Alga Frunze	171	(86)
1990	FC Dnepr Dnepropetrovsk	18	(0)
1991	FC Rotor Volgograd	39	(15)
1992	SC Tavriya Simferopol	18	(12)
1993	FC Dinamo Moscow	9	(1)
1994	FC Lada Togliatti	5	(0)
1995	FC Torpedo Volzhsky	28	(4)

International career
1992	Ukraine	2	(1)
- * Club domestic league appearances and goals

Yuriy Arkadiyovych Hudymenko (Ukrainian: Юрій Аркадійович Гудименко; born 10 March 1966) is a former professional footballer. Born in Kyrgyzstan, he represented Ukraine internationally.

== Career ==
Hudymenko is a product of the main Bishkek sports school and later was accepted to the main republican club of Kyrgyzia, FC Alga Bishkek.

In 1990 he made his debut in the Soviet Top League playing for FC Dnepr Dnepropetrovsk, but failed to score any goals in domestic competitions, but did score a goal against Heart of Midlothian F.C. in the 1990-91 UEFA Cup. Next year Hudymenko joined recently relegated FC Rotor Volgograd that was competing in the Soviet First League and gained promotion for the next year, but the Soviet Union fell apart and its football competitions were discontinued.

Upon the dissolution of the Soviet Union, in 1992 he joined the Ukrainian Premier League playing for the Crimean Tavriya Simferopol becoming the Ukrainian Premier League top goalscorer with 12 goals as the Crimean club took the inaugural league title. Hudymenko stayed with Tavriya until the end of the year and played four games for the team in the 1992–93 UEFA Champions League where the team was eliminated in the first round by FC Sion.

In 1993 he joined FC Dynamo Moscow competing in the Russian Premier League and the following year in FC Lada Togliatti.

=== International ===
He also earned two caps for Ukraine; the first coming against the US in a scoreless friendly in Piscataway and the second against Hungary in a 2–1 friendly defeat on 26 August 1992 in Nyíregyháza in a match in which he scored a goal.

== Career statistics ==
=== International goals ===
№	Date	Venue	Opponent	Score	Result	Competition
1	26 August 1992	Városi Stadion, Nyíregyháza, Hungary	Hungary	1–0	1–2	Friendly match

== Honours ==
Tavriya Simferopol

- Ukrainian Premier League champion: 1992.

Individual

- Ukrainian Premier League top scorer: 1992.
