= Viktor Hromov =

Ukrainian footballer

Personal information
- Full name: Viktor Oleksiyovych Hromov
- Date of birth: 3 February 1965 (age 61)
- Place of birth: Soviet Union
- Height: 1.74 m (5 ft 9 in)
- Position: Striker

Senior career*
Years	Team	Apps	(Gls)
1987–1988	Shakhtar Donetsk-d	?	(5)
1987	→Pivdenstal Yenakiyeve	?	(?)
1987	→Torpedo Zaporizhzhia	2	(0)
1989	Pivdenstal Yenakiyeve	18	(8)
1989	Novator Mariupol	14	(1)
1990–1992	Shakhtar Pavlohrad	109	(46)
1992–1997	Kryvbas Kryvyi Rih	145	(18)
1997–1999	Metalurh Zaporizhzhia	27	(8)
1999	→Metalurh-2 Zaporizhzhia	5	(2)
1999–2000	Polihraftekhnika Oleksandriya	13	(4)
- * Club domestic league appearances and goals

Viktor Hromov (Ukrainian: Віктор Олексійович Громов; born February 3, 1965) is a Ukrainian former football forward.
