= Sergei Gladyshev =

Russian footballer

Personal information
- Full name: Sergei Yegorovich Gladyshev
- Date of birth: 9 December 1960 (age 65)
- Height: 1.69 m (5 ft 6 1/2 in)
- Position: Forward

Youth career
- FC Almaz Moscow

Senior career*
Years	Team	Apps	(Gls)
1981	FC SKA Novosibirsk		
1986	FC Shinnik Yaroslavl	9	(0)
1987–1990	FC Spartak Kostroma	138	(46)
1991	FC Shinnik Yaroslavl	40	(8)
1992	Tavriya Simferopol	19	(6)
1992–1993	FC Shinnik Yaroslavl	19	(4)
1993–1994	FC Gigant Voskresensk	45	(11)
1994	FC Spartak Kostroma	9	(2)
1995	FC Moskvich-Aleko Moscow (amateur)		
1995–1996	FC Kosmos Dolgoprudny	58	(7)
1996	FC Dynamo Shatura		
1997	FC Spartak Lukhovitsy	38	(4)
1999	FC Dynamo Shatura		
2000–2001	FC Shatura		
2006	FC Metallist Domodedovo		
2011–2014	FC Tretiy Taym Moscow		
Medal record
SC Tavriya Simferopol
Winner	Ukrainian Top League	1992
- * Club domestic league appearances and goals

Sergei Yegorovich Gladyshev (Russian: Сергей Егорович Гладышев; born 9 December 1960) is a former Russian football player.

== Honours ==
Tavriya Simferopol

- Ukrainian Premier League champion: 1992
