= Yevhen Kucherevskyi =

Ukrainian football coach (1941–2006)

Personal information
- Full name: Yevhen Mefodiyovych Kucherevskyi; Evgeny Mefodyevich Kucherevsky
- Date of birth: 6 August 1941
- Place of birth: Kherson, Ukrainian SSR, Soviet Union
- Date of death: 26 August 2006 (aged 65)
- Place of death: Dnipropetrovsk, Ukraine
- Height: 1.76 m (5 ft 9 in)
- Position: Goalkeeper

Senior career*
Years	Team	Apps	(Gls)
1958–1961	Spartak Kherson		
1961–1962	Enerhiya Nova Kakhovka		
1963–1964	SKA Odessa		
1965–1967	Sudostroitel Mykolaiv	21	(0)
1968	Avanhard Zhovti Vody	27	(0)
1969–1970	Enerhiya Nova Kakhovka		

Managerial career
- 1976–1981: Kolos Nikopol (assistant)
- 1982–1983: Kolos Nikopol
- 1984–1985: Sudostroitel Mykolaiv
- 1986: Dnipro Dnipropetrovsk
- 1987–1992: Dnipro Dnipropetrovsk
- 1992: Etoile SS
- 1992–1993: Russia U-19
- 1993: Russia U-21 (assistant)
- 1993–1994: Russia U-21
- 1994–1997: SC Mykolaiv
- 1997–1999: Arsenal Tula
- 1999: Uralan Elista
- 2000: Dnipromine Academy Dnipropetrovsk
- 2000: Rotor Volgograd
- 2001: Torpedo-ZIL Moscow
- 2001–2005: Dnipro Dnipropetrovsk
- 2005–2006: Dnipro Dnipropetrovsk (sports director)
- * Club domestic league appearances and goals

Yevhen Mefodiyovych Kucherevskyi (Ukrainian: Євген Мефодiйoвич Кучеревський, Russian: Евгений Мефодьевич Кучеревский; 6 August 1941 – 26 August 2006) was a Ukrainian football coach and former player. In his spells managing Dnipro Dnipropetrovsk he won the Soviet Championship in 1988, took second place twice in 1987 and 1989, as well as the USSR Cup in 1989. Dnipro's recent success in the first half of the 2000s is mostly attributed to his coaching as well.

On 26 August 2006, Kucherevskyi's Mercedes-Benz suffered a head-on collision with a KAMAZ truck. He died an hour and half later in a hospital, without regaining consciousness.

Upon Kucherevskyi's funeral, Dnipropetrovsk mayor Ivan Kulichenko, announced a plan to name one of the city streets in his honor.
