= Serhiy Yesin =

Ukrainian footballer (born 1975)

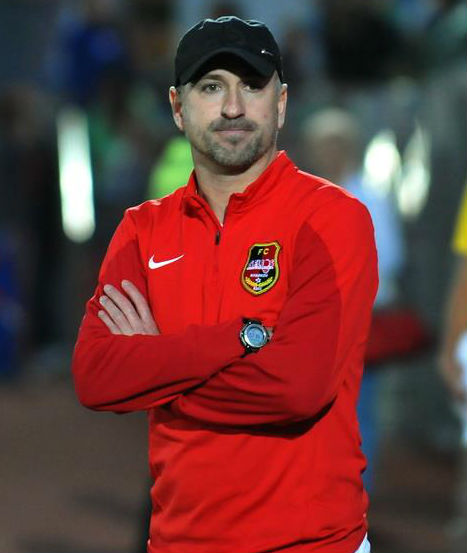

Personal information
- Full name: Serhiy Oleksandrovych Yesin
- Date of birth: 2 April 1975 (age 51)
- Place of birth: Kerch, Soviet Union (now Ukraine)
- Height: 1.73 m (5 ft 8 in)
- Position: Midfielder

Senior career*
Years	Team	Apps	(Gls)
1992–2000	Tavriya Simferopol	194	(13)
2001–2002	Metalist Kharkiv	18	(1)
2001	→ Metalist-2 Kharkiv	2	(0)
2002	Sevastopol	12	(0)
2003	Navbahor Namangan	12	(1)
2004–2005	Tavriya Simferopol	12	(0)
2005–2006	Helios Kharkiv	47	(1)
2006–2009	Zakarpattia Uzhhorod	82	(0)

International career
1996	Ukraine	2	(0)

Managerial career
- 2009–2011: Zakarpattia Uzhhorod (assistant)
- 2011–2012: Helios Kharkiv (assistant)
- 2013–2015: Helios Kharkiv
- 2015: Okean Kerch (assistant)
- 2016: Okean Kerch
Medal record
SC Tavriya Simferopol
Runner-up	Ukrainian Cup	1993–94
Navbahor Namangan
Third place	Uzbek League	2003
- * Club domestic league appearances and goals

Serhiy Oleksandrovych Yesin (Ukrainian: Сергій Олександрович Єсін; born 2 April 1975) is a Ukrainian football coach and former player.

== Playing career ==
Yesin was born in Kerch. He took part in the 1992 Vyshcha Liha final playing for Tavriya Simferopol. Since it was his only game of the season, he did not receive the gold medal.
