= Andrey Aleksanenkov =

Russian professional footballer (born 1969)

Personal information
- Full name: Andrey Nikolayevich Aleksanenkov
- Date of birth: 27 March 1969 (age 57)
- Place of birth: Moscow, Soviet Union
- Height: 1.81 m (5 ft 11 in)
- Positions: Defender; midfielder

Youth career
- –1986: FC Dynamo Moscow

Senior career*
Years	Team	Apps	(Gls)
1986–1989	FC Dynamo Moscow	0	(0)
1986–1987	→ FC Dynamo Moscow (reserves)	1	(0)
1987–1989	→ FC Dynamo-2 Moscow	68	(2)
1990–1994	Dynamo Kyiv	26	(0)
1992	→ Dynamo-2 Kyiv	1	(0)
1993–1994	→ Dynamo-2 Kyiv	14	(1)
1994	Metalist Kharkiv	0	(0)
1994–1995	Mykolaiv	18	(1)
1995–1996	FC KAMAZ-Chally Naberezhnye Chelny	24	(0)

Managerial career
- 1996–2004: SDYuShOR Trudovye Rezervy Moscow (assistant)
- 2005–: SDYuShOR Burevestnik Moscow (assistant)
Medal record
FC Dynamo Kyiv
Second place	Ukrainian Top League	1992
First place	Ukrainian Top League	1992–93
Winner	Ukrainian Cup	1992–93
- * Club domestic league appearances and goals

Andrey Nikolayevich Aleksanenkov (Ukrainian: Андрій Миколайович Алексаненков; Russian: Андрей Николаевич Алексаненков; born 27 March 1969) is a former Russian professional footballer.

== Brief overview ==
Aleksanenkov is a graduate of the Dynamo Moscow football academy. He played for the main squad of FC Dynamo Moscow in the USSR Federation Cup. He made his professional debut in the Soviet Second League in 1988 for FC Dynamo-2 Moscow.

In his career Aleksanenkov played 44 games at the Ukrainian Higher League and 24 games at the Russian Higher League. He also accounted for a goal in the Ukrainian top division. Aleksanenkov also played 9 games for the Soviet side Dynamo Kyiv in the continental club competitions.

== Honours ==
- Soviet Top League champion: 1990.
- Ukrainian Premier League champion: 1993, 1994, 1995.

== European club competitions ==
- European Cup Winners' Cup 1990–91 with FC Dynamo Kyiv: 4 games.
- European Cup 1991–92 with FC Dynamo Kyiv: 5 games.
- UEFA Cup 1992–93 with FC Dynamo Kyiv: 1 game.
- UEFA Intertoto Cup 1996 with FC KAMAZ-Chally Naberezhnye Chelny: 2 games.
