= Valeriy Dushkov =

Ukrainian football coach (born 1953)

Valery Dushkov
Personal information
- Full name: Valery Oleksiyovych Dushkov
- Date of birth: April 10, 1953 (age 73)
- Place of birth: Kospash, Molotov Oblast, Soviet Union
- Position: Forward

Senior career*
Years	Team	Apps	(Gls)
- SC Tavriya Simferopol
- FC Spartak Belgorod
1980–1984	FC Naftovyk Okhtyrka	114	(8)

Managerial career
- 1980–1984: FC Naftovyk Okhtyrka
- 1990–1992: FC Naftovyk Okhtyrka
- 1992: FC Yavir Krasnopillya
- 1993–1994: FC Yavir Krasnopillya
- 1994: FC Nyva Ternopil
- 1995: FC Temp-Advis Khmelnytskyi
- 1995–1997: FC Yavir Krasnopillya
- 2001: FC Nyva Vinnytsia
- 2002: FC Prykarpattia Ivano-Frankivsk
- 2004: Al Tahaddy SC (Benghazi)
- 2005: FC Spartak Sumy
- 2006–2008: SC Tavriya Simferopol (assistant)
- 2012–2016: Ukraine (assistant)
- * Club domestic league appearances and goals

Valery Dushkov (Ukrainian: Валерій Олексійович Душков; born 10 April 1953) is a Russian-born Ukrainian football coach and a former footballer.

He was born in the city of Kospash (today part of Kizel), Perm Oblast. Dushkov started his coaching career as a playing coach in Okhtyrka.

In 2012–2016 he was helping Mykhailo Fomenko with the Ukraine national football team.
