= Yuriy Hritsyna =

Ukrainian footballer and coach

Personal information
- Full name: Yuriy Vasylyovych Hritsyna
- Date of birth: 15 June 1971 (age 55)
- Place of birth: Sievierodonetsk, Ukrainian SSR
- Height: 1.75 m (5 ft 9 in)
- Positions: Midfielder; forward

Senior career*
Years	Team	Apps	(Gls)
1988–1989	Zorya Voroshylovhrad	41	(4)
1990–1994	Dynamo Kyiv	43	(10)
1993–1994	→ Dynamo-2 Kyiv	16	(8)
1994–1995	Dynamo-Gazovik Tyumen	38	(2)
1996–1997	Uralan Elista	72	(17)
1998–1999	Sokol Saratov	65	(6)
2000	FBK Kaunas	7	(3)
2001	Arsenal Tula	8	(0)
2002	Chernomorets Novorossiysk	3	(0)
2003	Liepājas Metalurgs	20	(3)
2004	Dynamo Stavropol	25	(2)
2005	Volga Nizhny Novgorod	34	(3)
2006	Ditton Daugavpils	25	(1)
2008–2009	Dnipro Cherkasy	25	(1)

International career
1993	Ukraine	2	(0)
- * Club domestic league appearances and goals

Yuriy Vasylyovych Hritsyna (Ukrainian: Юрій Васильович Гріцина; born 15 June 1971) is a Ukrainian professional football coach and a former player.

== Club career ==
He made his professional debut in the Soviet First League in 1988 for FC Zarya Voroshilovgrad.

== Honours ==
- Ukrainian Premier League champion: 1993, 1994.
- Ukrainian Premier League runner-up: 1992.
- Ukrainian Cup winner: 1993.
- Lithuanian A Lyga champion: 2000.

== European club competitions ==
- European Cup 1991–92 with FC Dynamo Kyiv: 7 games, 1 goal.
- UEFA Cup 1992–93 with FC Dynamo Kyiv: 2 games.
- UEFA Champions League 1993–94 with FC Dynamo Kyiv: 1 game.
- UEFA Champions League 2000–01 with FBK Kaunas: 2 games.
- UEFA Cup 2003–04 with FK Liepājas Metalurgs: 1 game.
