= Serhiy Shmatovalenko =

Ukrainian footballer (born 1967)

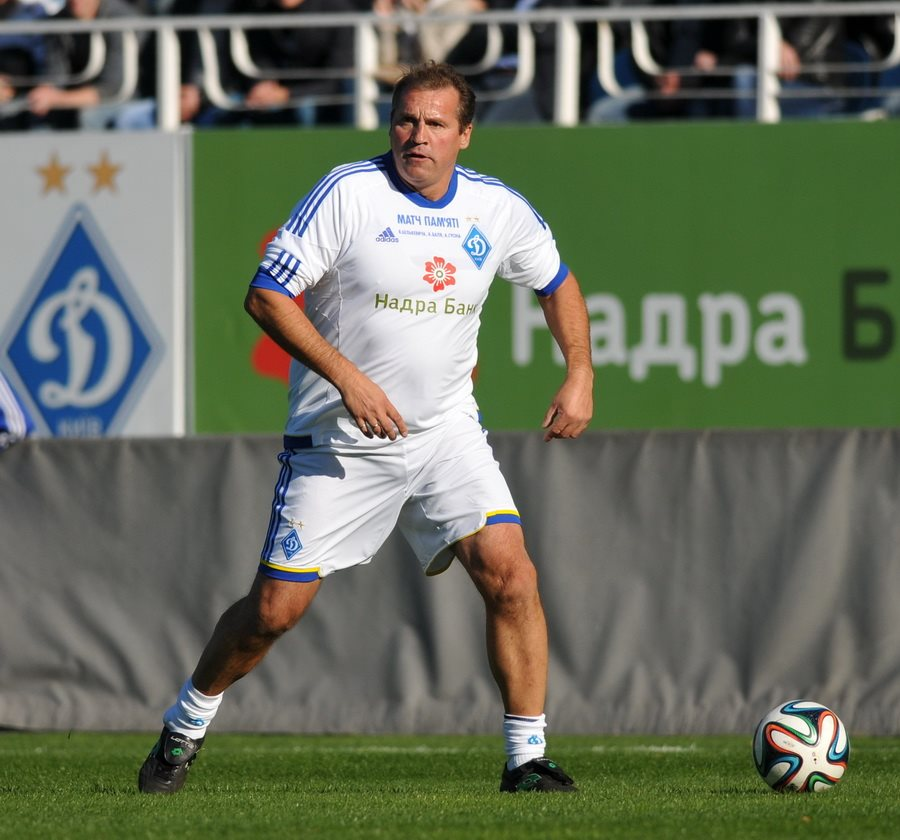
- Shmatovalenko in 2014

Personal information
- Full name: Serhiy Serhiyovich Shmatovalenko
- Date of birth: 20 January 1967 (age 59)
- Place of birth: Odesa, Ukrainian SSR
- Height: 1.82 m (6 ft 0 in)
- Position: Defender

Senior career*
| Years | Team | Apps | (Gls) |
| 1984–1985 | Chornomorets Odesa | 1 | (0) |
| 1985–1986 | SKA Odesa | 50 | (4) |
| 1987 | CSKA Moscow | 15 | (0) |
| 1987–1998 | Dynamo Kyiv | 213 | (4) |
| 1996–1998 | Dynamo-2 Kyiv | 26 | (0) |
| 1997–1999 | Dynamo-3 Kyiv | 5 | (0) |
| 1999 | Krylia Sovetov Samara | 7 | (0) |
| 1999–2000 | Sheriff Tiraspol | 11 | (0) |
| Total | | 328 | (8) |

International career
| 1990 | USSR (U21) | 11 | |
| 1988–1990 | USSR | 2 | (0) |
| 1992–1996 | Ukraine | 8 | (0) |

Managerial career
- 2001–2002: Zakarpattia Uzhhorod (assistant)
- 2002–2003: Ukraine U19 (assistant)
- 2003–2004: Dynamo Kyiv (scout)
- 2004–2007: Dynamo-2 Kyiv (assistant)
- 2014–2016: Dynamo Kyiv U21 (assistant)
- 2016–2017: Dynamo Kyiv U19 (assistant)
- 2017–2021: Dynamo Kyiv U21 (assistant)
- 2021: Chornomorets Odesa (assistant)
Medal record
Men's football
Representing Soviet Union
UEFA European U-16 Championships
| Runner-up | 1984 West Germany |
UEFA European Under-21 Championship
| Winner | 1990 Europe |
- * Club domestic league appearances and goals

Serhiy Serhiyovich Shmatovalenko (or Sergei Sergeyevich Shmatovalenko) (Russian: Серге́й Серге́евич Шматоваленко; born 20 January 1967) is a Ukrainian football coach and former player.

== International career ==
Shmatovalenko made his debut for USSR on 21 September 1988 in a friendly against West Germany in which he scored an own goal. Until 1990 Shmatovalenko still was a member of the Soviet Union national under-21 football team for which he capped 11 games.

On 26 August 1992 he started to play for Ukraine when he participated in a friendly against Hungary.

== Honours ==
- 1990 UEFA European Under-21 Football Championship winner.
- Soviet Top League winner: 1990.
- Soviet Top League runner-up: 1988.
- Soviet Top League bronze: 1989.
- Soviet Cup winner: 1990.
- Ukrainian Premier League winner: 1993, 1994, 1995, 1996, 1997, 1998.
- Ukrainian Premier League runner-up: 1992.
- Ukrainian Cup winner: 1993, 1996.
- Moldovan National Division runner-up: 2000.
