= Volodymyr Pianykh =

Ukrainian footballer (born 1951)

Personal information
- Date of birth: 5 February 1951 (age 75)
- Place of birth: Stalino, Ukrainian SSR, Soviet Union
- Position: Defender

Youth career
- 1962–1969: Shakhtar Donetsk

Senior career*
Years	Team	Apps	(Gls)
1970–1971	Shakhtar Donetsk	12	(0)
1971	FC Shakhtar Kadiivka	19	(3)
1972–1973	SC Chernihiv	?	(8)
1974–1983	Shakhtar Donetsk	41	(8)
1984	FC Shakhtar Horlivka	38	(2)

International career
1969	USSR (under-19)	7	(0)
1979	Ukraine	?	
Medal record
Men's football
Representing Soviet Union
UEFA European U-18 Championships
Bronze medal – third place	1969 East Germany
Refereeing career
Domestic
Years	League	Role
1987–1991	Soviet Top League	Referee
1992–1998	Ukrainian Premier League	Referee
International
Years	League	Role
1990-1998	FIFA listed	Referee
- * Club domestic league appearances and goals

Volodymyr Dmytrovych Pianykh (Ukrainian: Володимир Дмитрович П'яних; born 5 February 1951) is a Ukrainian footballer who played as a defender for Shakhtar Donetsk. After retiring as a player, Pianykh became a football referee.

In 1979 Pianykh played couple of games for Ukraine at the Spartakiad of the Peoples of the USSR.

Pianykh was a referee at the 1994 FIFA World Cup qualification match between Finland and Israel that took place on 16 June 1993 in Lahti, Finland.
