= FC Temp Shepetivka =

- Founded: 1990; 36 years ago
- Dissolved: 1996; 30 years ago
- Ground: Lokomotyv Stadium
- League: defunct
| Home colours | Away colours |

FC Temp Shepetivka was a Ukrainian football club from Shepetivka. In the winter of 1996, the club was dissolved and replaced with a random created team based on the Kamianets-Podilskyi sports school to finish the season.

== History ==
The club was situated in Shepetivka, Ukraine. Temp Shepetivka took part in the first Ukrainian Premier League season in 1992, after being initially chosen to participate for winning the Cup of the Ukrainian SSR among amateur teams in 1991.

The chairman of the club was Dzhumber Nishnianidze.

Temp Shepetivka took last place in its group that season and was demoted to the Persha Liha as a result. The club later resurfaced for two more seasons, achieving a 9th place in the 1993–94 season of the Ukrainian Premier League.

In 1995, the club merged with FC Advis Khmelnytskyi (owned by local agrarian equipment factory) and was renamed to Temp-ADVIS and moved to Khmelnytskyi. After its relegation to the First League it was renamed to "Ratusha" and played its games in Kamianets-Podilsky. Because of its unsuccessful season, the club then became defunct.

== Honors ==
- Cup of the Ukrainian SSR
  - Winners (1): 1991

== League and cup history ==
Soviet Union

| Season | Div. | Pos. | Pl. | W | D | L | GS | GA | P | Ukrainian Cup | Europe | Notes |
|---|---|---|---|---|---|---|---|---|---|---|---|---|
| 1990 | 4th | 1 | 30 | 24 | 4 | 2 | 69 | 20 | 52 | | | qualified for the final |
| 1990 | 4th | 4 | 5 | 2 | 1 | 2 | 7 | 8 | 5 | | | Promoted |
| 1991 | 3rd (lower) | 9 | 50 | 19 | 15 | 16 | 64 | 53 | 53 | Winner | | Promoted |

Ukraine

| Season | Div. | Pos. | Pl. | W | D | L | GS | GA | P | Domestic Cup | Europe | Notes |
|---|---|---|---|---|---|---|---|---|---|---|---|---|
| 1992 | 1st | 10 | 18 | 2 | 4 | 12 | 9 | 34 | 8 | 1/32 finals | | Group A Relegated |
| 1992–93 | 2nd | 2 | 42 | 25 | 8 | 9 | 68 | 48 | 58 | 1/8 | | Promoted |
| 1993–94 | 1st | 9 | 34 | 12 | 8 | 14 | 39 | 38 | 32 | 1/8 | | |
| 1994–95 | 1st | 17 | 34 | 10 | 4 | 20 | 31 | 41 | 34 | 1/4 | | three-point system Rlegated |
| 1995–96 | 2nd | 21 | 42 | 6 | 2 | 34 | 14 | 103 | 20 | | | Rlegated; Folded |

== Head coaches ==
Temp

- (Soviet Union) Ishtvan Sekech: 1990–1992
- (Ukraine) Zaya Avdysh: August — September 1992
- (Ukraine) Yuriy Voynov: September — December 1992
- (Ukraine) Serhiy Dotsenko: January — May 1993
- (Ukraine) Leonid Tkachenko: May 1993–1994
- (Russia) Stanislav Bernikov: March — April 1995
- (Georgia (country)) Revaz Dzodzuashvili: April — June 1995

Temp-Advis

- (Ukraine) Valeriy Dushkov: June — August 1995
- (Ukraine) Valentyn Kryachko: August — November 1995

Ratusha

- (Ukraine) Oleksandr Petrov: March — June 1996

== See also ==
- FC Advis Khmelnytskyi
