= Yevhen Kanana =

Soviet footballer and referee

Personal information
- Full name: Yevhen Vitalyovych Kanana
- Date of birth: 27 March 1953 (age 73)
- Place of birth: Stalino, Ukrainian SSR, Soviet Union
- Height: 1.84 m (6 ft 0 in)
- Position: Midfielder

Youth career
- Shakhtar Donetsk

Senior career*
Years	Team	Apps	(Gls)
1972–1974	Shakhtar Donetsk	6	(1)
1975	Lokomotyv Zhdanov	4	(0)
1976–1978	Vostok Ust-Kamenogorsk		
1978–1979	Gazovik Orenburg		

Managerial career
- 1993–96: Shakhtar Makiivka (scout)
- Metalurh Donetsk (scout)
- Shakhtar Donetsk (scout)
- 2010–: Illichivets Mariupol (general director)
- * Club domestic league appearances and goals

Yevhen Kanana
Domestic
Years	League	Role
1990–1991	Soviet Top League	Referee
1992	Ukrainian Premier League	Referee

International
Years	League	Role

Yevhen Kanana (born 27 March 1953) is a Soviet footballer and referee of the Soviet Union and Ukraine.

== Key matches ==
- 1988 Soviet League Cup Final
- 1990 Soviet League Cup Final
- 1992 Ukrainian Cup Final
