= Serhiy Zayets =

Ukrainian footballer (born 1969)

Personal information
- Full name: Serhiy Anatoliyovych Zayets
- Date of birth: 18 August 1969 (age 57)
- Place of birth: Berdychiv, Ukrainian SSR
- Height: 1.88 m (6 ft 2 in)
- Position: Defender

Senior career*
Years	Team	Apps	(Gls)
1985–1986	Spartak Zhytomyr		
1986–1993	Dynamo Kyiv	90	(10)
1993–1994	Nyva Vinnytsia	8	(0)
1994–1995	Uralmash Yekaterinburg	17	(0)

International career
1988–1990	Soviet Union U21		
1990–1991	Soviet Union Olympic	2	(0)

Managerial career
- 2017–2018: FC Vorkuta
Medal record
Men's football
Representing Soviet Union
UEFA European U-19 Championships
Winner	1988 Czechoslovakia
UEFA European U-16 Championships
Bronze medal – third place	1986 Greece
UEFA European Under-21 Championship
Winner	1990 Europe
- * Club domestic league appearances and goals

Serhiy Anatoliyovych Zayets (Ukrainian: Сергій Анатолійович Заєць; born 18 August 1969) is a Ukrainian professional football coach and former player.

== Club career ==
Zayets began playing in his home region in the Soviet Second League with Spartak Zhytomyr in 1985. He made his professional debut in the Soviet Top League in 1989 for Dynamo Kyiv. Throughout his tenure in the Soviet top division, he helped Dynamo secure the league double in 1990. After the collapse of the Soviet Union, Kyiv became a founding member of the Ukrainian Premier League. Zayets would win the Ukrainian league double in 1993 with Dynamo. The following season, he played his final season in Ukraine with Nyva Vinnytsia.

After several seasons in Ukraine, he played two seasons in the Russian top-tier league with Ural Yekaterinburg. He retired from professional football after his two seasons in the Russian circuit.

== Managerial career ==
Zayets managed abroad in the Canadian Soccer League for expansion side Vorkuta in 2017. In his debut season in the Canadian circuit, he led the club to a divisional title. In the opening round of the playoffs, Vorkuta defeated Royal Toronto FC. The club would be eliminated from the postseason tournament in the next round by Scarborough SC.

== Honours ==
=== Player ===
Dynamo Kyiv

- Soviet Top League: 1990
- Soviet Cup: 1990
- Ukrainian Premier League: 1993
- Ukrainian Cup: 1993

Soviet Union U19

- UEFA European Under-19 Championship: 1988

Soviet Union U21

- UEFA European Under-21 Championship: 1990

=== Manager ===
FC Vorkuta

- Canadian Soccer League First Division: 2017
