= Anatoliy Zayayev =

Ukrainian football coach (1931–2012)

Anatoliy Zayaev
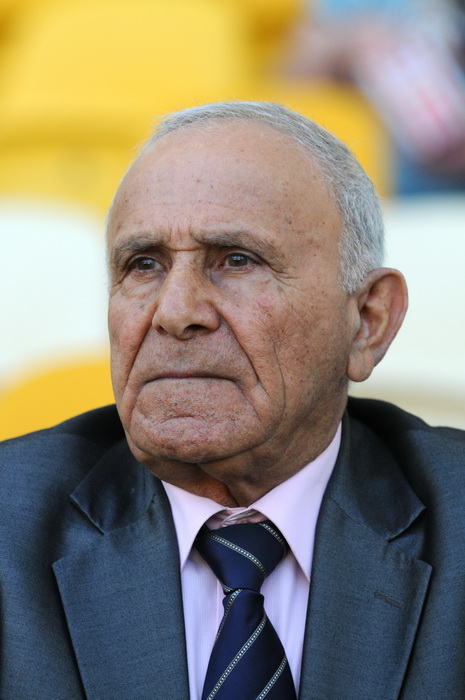

Personal information
- Full name: Anatoliy Mykolayovych Zayaev
- Date of birth: October 27, 1931
- Place of birth: Simferopol, Russian SFSR, USSR
- Date of death: December 18, 2012 (aged 81)
- Place of death: near Melitopol, Ukraine

Senior career*
Years	Team	Apps	(Gls)
- Pishchevik Simferopol

Managerial career
- 1963: Tavriya Simferopol
- 1967: Tavriya Simferopol
- 1972: Tavriya Simferopol
- 1979: Dnipro Dnipropetrovsk (assistant)
- 1979: Tavriya Simferopol
- 1980–1983: Atlantyka Sevastopol
- 1986: Tavriya Simferopol (assistant)
- 1988: Tavriya Simferopol
- 1991–1994: Tavriya Simferopol
- 1997–1998: Mykolaiv
- 1998–1999: Prykarpattia Ivano-Frankivsk
- 2000: Polissya Zhytomyr
- 2001: Cherkasy
- 2002–2004: Tavriya Simferopol (vice-president)
- 2002–2004: Tavriya Simferopol
- 2005–2006: Yalos Yalta (vice-president)
- 2012: Metalurh Zaporizhzhia (sporting director)
- 2012: Metalurh Zaporizhzhia (caretaker)
- * Club domestic league appearances and goals

Anatoliy Zayaev (October 27, 1931 – December 18, 2012) was a Soviet football player and a Ukrainian coach. Merited Coach of Ukraine.

== Biography ==
Zayaev was born in Simferopol in a big Assyrian family. Participant of World War II. The Soviet regime authorities' firing squad shot his father in 1938 (Great Purge), his younger brother Oleksandr was killed during the German occupation of Crimea, and his older brother Oleksiy perished in March 1945 in Germany.

Zayaev graduated from the Simferopol State University and then worked at the city's meat factory. Simultaneously, he was both a player and an administrator for the factory's team, "Pishchevik". With his participation, the Simferopol team was accepted into Class B of the Soviet competitions in 1958. In 1962, Tavriya placed third in the final stage of the Ukrainian championship. After that, Zayaev left the team. On multiple occasions, he was fired many times from the team's staff position.

Tavriya started the 1963 season poorly and, for a long time, could not win. Antonin Sochnev was then fired, and Zayaev returned to the team. He was the acting head coach, and after his first game away, the team won. The team began to recover and avoided relegation. According to his own admission, Zayaev has been working as a coach since 1973, having amassed a great deal of knowledge.

During Soviet times, Zayaev won the Ukrainian championship on several occasions, the Cup of the Ukrainian SSR, the Ukrainian Spartakiad, led teams to the top of the Soviet First League and semifinals of the Soviet Cup. Until the 1990s, he worked for SC Tavriya Simferopol as the team director. In 1992, he became famous by obtaining the national title when SC Tavriya Simferopol beat FC Dynamo Kyiv in Lviv. After 1995, Zayaev once again became unnecessary.

After that went to Chișinău to coach the local Constructorul Chișinău in 1996–97. The next season, Zayaev led MFK Mykolaiv to the top of the Ukrainian First League. In 1998-99, he coached Prykarpattia. After that, Zayaev returned to Tavria for couple of more seasons. After being let go in 2005, Zayaev initiated the creation of a new club in Yalta, FC Yalos Yalta, head coach of which was appointed Oleksandr Haydash. Although the team placed fourth in its first season in the Ukrainian Second League, it folded and did not participate in subsequent seasons. After that, Zayaev created another club near Bakhchisaray, IKS-Academy Kuibysheve.

In 2010 the head coach of MFK Mykolaiv Ruslan Zabransky acquired him as a coach-consultant. In 2012 Zayaev worked in Metalurh Zaporizhia.

== Death ==
He was killed in a traffic accident on Tuesday evening December 18, 2012, while driving own vehicle. The accident took place on the highway Kharkiv - Simferopol less than a mile away from Melitopol. Zayaev who was driving Honda CR-V to Simferopol went into the oncoming traffic lane and collided with a towing truck that was moving towards Zaporizhia. From the collision the towing truck caught fire and its driver burned inside.

== Coaching style ==
Because Zayaev did not have a specialized education, he often was called a "self-taught" coach. He considers psychology as the basis for building training process, an ability to manage human relationships. In recognition of the former players "Tavriya", Zayayev required result not only in the successful performance of the team on the field, but also by the ability to build relationships with football referees.

== Honours ==
=== Achievements ===
- Higher League of Ukraine
  - Winner: 1992
- Ukrainian Cup
  - Final: 1993-94

=== Recognition and awards ===
- Merited Coach of Ukraine
- Merited Coach of Moldova
- Order of Merit 2nd and 3rd degrees

== Private life ==
His wife Alla is seven years younger than him. His son was the president of SC Tavriya Simferopol (January 1992 - May 1994) and was killed on May 1, 1994. He was survived by his wife and two children.

=== Letter to the President of Ukraine (Viktor Yanukovych) ===
A year before his death, Zayaev wrote a letter to the President of Ukraine Viktor Yanukovych asking to take under own control the investigation of his son's murder case. In the letter Zayaev not only identified killers who as he claimed were known to him, but also particular officials: judge, prosecutor, investigator, SBU agents who were covering the killers.

When I found out all the details of the murder of my son, for me, as to a father, was the meaning of life to punish the villains.

— Anatoliy Zayaev, Последняя надежда – на Гаранта…. "Nash Vek". July 21, 2011.
