= Anatoliy Puzach =

Ukrainian footballer and coach (1941–2006)

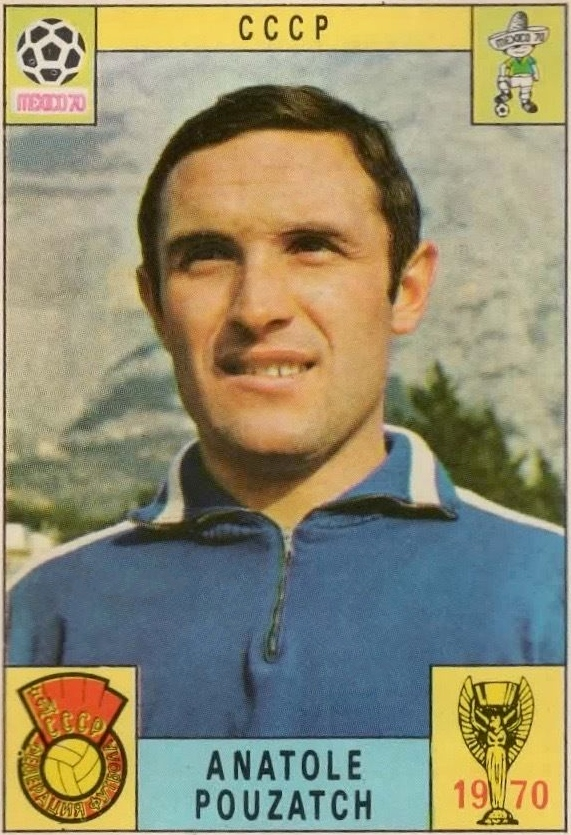

Personal information
- Full name: Anatoliy Kyrylovych Puzach
- Date of birth: 3 June 1941
- Place of birth: Krasnyi Kut, Soviet Union (now Russia)
- Date of death: 19 March 2006 (aged 64)
- Place of death: Kyiv, Ukraine
- Position: Striker

Youth career
- –1957: Berdychiv

Senior career*
Years	Team	Apps	(Gls)
1957–1959	Prohres Berdychiv		
1960–1961	Polissya Zhytomyr	21	(8)
1962–1963	SKA Lviv	57+	(43)
1963	CSKA Moscow	0	(0)
1965–1973	Dynamo Kyiv	216	(49)

International career
1969–1972	Soviet Union	14	(2)

Managerial career
- 1974–1990: Dynamo Kyiv (assistant)
- 1990–1992: Dynamo Kyiv
- 1997–2000: Dynamo Kyiv (assistant)
- * Club domestic league appearances and goals

Anatoliy Kyrylovych (or Anatoli Kirillovich) Puzach (Ukrainian: Анатолій Кирилович Пузач, Russian: Анатолий Кириллович Пузач; 3 June 1941 – 19 March 2006) was a Ukrainian football player and coach.

== Career ==
Puzach started his playing career for a factory team of Prohres in Polesia small city of Berdychiv which competed at the Zhytomyr Oblast competitions. In 1960 he signed up with the new team of masters that was created in 1959 in neighboring Zhytomyr, under name of Polissya which was playing in the Class B (2nd tier). His military obligatory service Puzach served in Lviv playing for the local SKA Lvov. During that period he was tried out at the Soviet army main club CSKA in Moscow. In 1964, he became the top scorer of Ukrainian zone, class "B" scored 35 goals. The same year Lviv army-men reached the Soviet Union Cup quarter-finals. In spring 1964 the team of class "B" best players had friendlies against Dynamo Kyiv (1:2, 2:2) and after those games the quick striker with a good kick have been taken to Kyiv.

From 1965 after signing with Dynamo, he played in the Soviet Top League, earlier known as Class A. He made his debut for Dynamo on 15 April 1965 in home game against Dinamo Moscow, which Kyiv won 1:0. In his first season for Dynamo which was coached by Viktor Maslov, Puzach scored 5 times in 18 matches. Overall, for Dynamo Puzach played over 200 league matches.

== Honours ==
- Soviet Top League
  - Winner: 1966, 1967, 1968, 1971, 1990 (as a manager)
  - Runner-up: 1965, 1969, 1972, 1973
- Soviet Cup
  - Winner: 1966
- Vyshcha Liha
  - Winner: 1993 (as a manager)

=== Titles and state awards ===
- Merited master of sports (Soviet Union)
- Merited coach (Ukrainian SSR, 1976)
- Order of Merit, 3rd class as a coach (posthumously, 2016)

== International career ==
Puzach made his debut for the USSR national team on 25 July 1969, in a friendly against East Germany national team and scored on his debut. He played at the 1970 FIFA World Cup final tournament and in the 1974 FIFA World Cup qualifiers. He was the first player in history to come on as a substitute in a World Cup game when non-injury substitutions were allowed for the first time in 1970. He replaced Viktor Serebryanikov in the opening match of the tournament against Mexico.
