= Stepan Betsa =

Ukrainian footballer (1970–1992)

Personal information
- Full name: Stepan Stepanovych Betsa
- Date of birth: April 29, 1970
- Place of birth: Mukacheve, Zakarpattia Oblast, Ukrainian SSR, Soviet Union
- Date of death: December 21, 1992 (aged 22)
- Place of death: Dnipropetrovsk, Ukraine
- Height: 1.76 m (5 ft 9 in)
- Position: Midfielder

Youth career
- ?–1987: Dnipro Dnipropetrovsk

Senior career*
Years	Team	Apps	(Gls)
1988	Shakhtar Horlivka	19	(5)
1988	Tavriya Simferopol	12	(1)
1989	Metalurh Zaporizhya	36	(2)
1990–1992	Dynamo Kyiv	51	(3)
- * Club domestic league appearances and goals

Stepan Betsa (Ukrainian: Степан Степанович Беца) was a Soviet and Ukrainian midfielder. He is a Master of Sports (1991). He died in a car accident.

== Biography ==
Stepan Betsa was born in Mukachevo, but he started his first steps in his football career in Dnipropetrovsk. Until his 18 Betsa played for a junior squad of Dnipro Dnipropetrovsk winning a tournament for junior squads in 1987. After he was not able to make to the main squad, Betsa left for the second league team FC Shakhtar Horlivka and after a half of season moved to the first league Tavriya Simferopol. During that season Betsa played over 30 games scoring for both clubs. In 1989, he moved again back to the continental Ukraine signing with the first league participant Metalurh Zaporizhia. In Zaporizhia he was noticed by the Dynamo Kyiv scouts and upon completion of a successful season signed with the best club of the Ukrainian football.

His first season in Dynamo in 1990 Betsa spent in a junior squad winning a champion title with it as well. Since 1991 Betsa became a key player of the club earning the most caps in the last Soviet championship. After the start of the independent Ukrainian championship Betsa status in the club has not changed and he participated in the final game of 1992 in Lviv. His career, however, was suddenly cut short after a car accident.

== Car crash ==
On December 21, 1992 the car accident took lives of two young Ukrainian footballers at once: Stepan Betsa (Dynamo Kyiv) and Oleksiy Sasko (Dnipro Dnipropetrovsk). As the first half of the Ukrainian championship ended the players took vacations and Stepan decided to visit Dnipropetrovsk. As later Volodymyr Sharan pointed out in his interview, they (him, Betsa and Sasko) left Kyiv in two cars, but Sharan turned to Kryvyi Rih, while Betsa and Sasko continued on to Dnipropetrovsk. After some time Sharan received a call from Betsa's wife that Stepan is in the emergency room (Sasko died at the crash site). After three days in a hospital Stepan Betsa died. According to a police report, the crash happened as a car that was moving 120 km/h (75 mph) crossed an icy portion of a road and a driver lost control of the vehicle. The auto ran right into a tree.

== Awards ==
Dynamo Kyiv

- Master of Sports
- 1992 League runner up
