= Yuriy Moroz =

Ukrainian footballer and coach

Yuriy Moroz Юрій Мороз
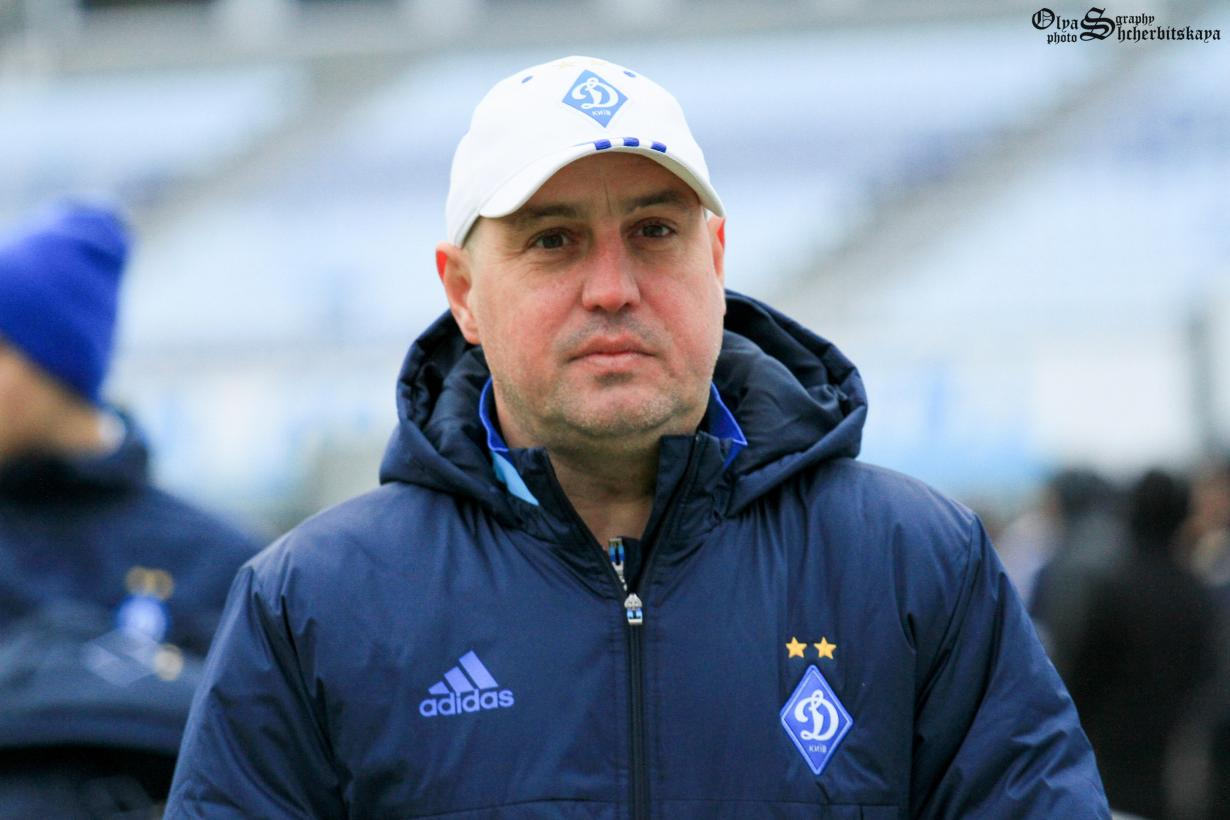

Personal information
- Full name: Yuriy Leontiyovych Moroz
- Date of birth: 8 September 1970 (age 56)
- Place of birth: Smila, Ukrainian SSR
- Height: 1.83 m (6 ft 0 in)
- Position: Defender

Team information
- Current team: Ukraine U17 (manager)

Youth career
- Lokomotiv Smila
- RSShI Kyiv

Senior career*
Years	Team	Apps	(Gls)
1986–1987	SKA Kyiv	7	(0)
1987–1992	Dynamo Kyiv	49	(1)
1992	→ Dynamo-2 Kyiv	14	(1)
1993	Veres Rivne	13	(4)
1993–1994	Hapoel Kfar Saba	38	(3)
1994–1995	Bnei Yehuda Tel Aviv	27	(1)
1995–1996	Maccabi Jaffa	22	(2)
1997–1998	Alania Vladikavkaz	47	(1)
1999–2001	Torpedo-ZIL Moscow	39	(1)
2001	Lokomotiv Nizhny Novgorod	4	(0)
2001–2002	Zakarpattia Uzhhorod	11	(0)
2002–2003	Vorskla Poltava	2	(0)
2003	→ Vorskla-2 Poltava	5	(0)

International career
1992	Ukraine	1	(0)

Managerial career
- 2004–2005: Ukraine U19 (assistant)
- 2005: Osvita Borodianka
- 2005–2007: Ukraine U17 (assistant)
- 2007–2008: Ukraine U18
- 2009–2010: Ukraine U19 (assistant)
- 2010–2011: Ukraine U17
- 2011–2012: Ukraine U18
- 2012–2013: Ukraine U19
- 2014–2016: Dynamo Kyiv U21 (assistant)
- 2016–2017: Dynamo Kyiv U19
- 2017–2021: Dynamo Kyiv U21
- 2021: Chornomorets Odesa
- 2022–: Ukraine U17
Medal record
Men's football
Representing Soviet Union
FIFA U-16 World Championship
Winner	1987 Canada
UEFA European U-16 Championships
Runner-up	1987 France
- * Club domestic league appearances and goals

Yuriy Leontiyovych Moroz (Ukrainian: Юрій Леонтійович Мороз; born 8 September 1970) is a Ukrainian professional football coach and a former player.

== Career ==
He made his professional debut in the Soviet Second League in 1986 for SKA Kyiv.

== Honours ==
- Soviet Top League champion: 1990.
- Ukrainian Premier League champion: 1993.
- Ukrainian Premier League runner-up: 1992.

== European club competitions ==
- 1990–91 European Cup Winners' Cup with FC Dynamo Kyiv: 1 game.
- 1991–92 European Cup with FC Dynamo Kyiv: 7 games, 1 goal.
- 1997–98 UEFA Cup with FC Alania Vladikavkaz: 1 game, 1 goal.
