= 1992–93 Ukrainian First League =

Ukrainian First League
- Season: 1992–93
- Champions: Nyva Vinnytsia
- Promoted: Nyva Vinnytsia; Temp Shepetivka
- Relegated: Ros Bila Tserkva; Shakhtar Pavlohrad
- Matches: 462
- Goals: 1,076 (2.33 per match)
- Top goalscorer: 26 – Roman Hryhorchuk (Prykarpattia), Ihor Koliada (Temp)
- Biggest home win: Naftovyk 7–0 Temp (Round 7); Dynamo-2 7–0 Khimik (Round 19); Polihraftekhnika 8–1 Artania (Round 44)
- Biggest away win: Zakarpattia 0–4 Ros (Round 44)
- Highest attendance: 12,000 – Nyva 3–1 Metalurh (Round 35), Evis 4–1 Vorskla (Round 41)

1992–93 Ukrainian First League was the second season of the Ukrainian First League.

The league was reorganized from the previous season into a single group of 22 teams of which the best one was Nyva Vinnytsia. The league was joined by six clubs relegated from the Ukrainian Premier League, while no clubs were promoted from the Ukrainian Second League. The biggest favorite of the season FC Naftovyk Okhtyrka missed its chance to get back to the League of the strongest. Impressive season was for the FC Vorskla Poltava and FC Polihraftekhnika Oleksandria who will be setting a pace in the following years in the league. Disappointing season had FC Metalurh Nikopol and FC Pryladyst Mukacheve that nearly made it to the Top League last season.

== Promotion and relegation ==
=== Promoted teams ===
- None

There were no clubs promoted from the 1992 Ukrainian Transition League.

=== Relegated teams ===
Six clubs were relegated from the 1992 Ukrainian Top League:

Group A

- Nyva Vinnytsia – 8th place
- Evis Mykolaiv – 9th place
- Temp Shepetivka – 10th place

Group B

- Naftovyk Okhtyrka – 8th place
- Prykarpattya Ivano-Frankivsk – 9th place
- SC Odesa – 10th place

=== Renamed teams ===
- At winter break Podillya Khmelnytskyi was renamed to Nord-Am-Podillia Khmelnytskyi.

=== Teams ===
In 1992-93 season, the Ukrainian First League consists of the following teams:

Locations of teams in First League

=== Stadiums ===
The following stadiums are considered home grounds for the teams in the competition.

Rank	Club	Capacity	Stadium	Notes
1	FC Vorskla Poltava	24,795 ?	Vorskla Stadium Vorota Stadium	home stadium Used in 11th, 22nd round
2	FC Dynamo-2 Kyiv	16,873	Dynamo Stadium	
3	FC Evis Mykolaiv	15,600	Evis Stadium	
4	SC Odesa	15,000 4,800	SKA Stadium Spartak Stadium	home stadium Used in 10th round
5	FC Nyva Vinnytsia	14,000	Lokomotyv Stadium, Vinnytsia	
6	FC Ros Bila Tserkva	13,500	Trudovi Rezervy Stadium	
7	FC Desna Chernihiv	12,060 1500 ?	Gagarin Stadium Yunist Stadium Kotsiubynske Village Stadium, Mykhailo-Kotsiubynske	home stadium Used in 7th, 8th rounds Used in 21st round
8	FC Zakarpattia Uzhhorod	12,000	Avanhard Stadium	
9	FC Nord-Am Podillya Khmelnytskyi	10,500	Podillya Stadium	
10	FC Stal Alchevsk	9,200	Stal Stadium	
11	FC Prykarpattia Ivano-Frankivsk	7,820	Elektron Stadium	
12	FC Metalurh Nikopol	7,200	Elektrometalurh Stadium	
14	FC Skala Stryi	6,000	Sokil Stadium	
15	FC Naftovyk Okhtyrka	5,256 ?	Naftovyk Stadium Kuts Stadium, Trostianets	home stadium Used in 11th, 12th, 17th rounds
16	FC Khimik Severodonetsk	5,000	Khimik Stadium	
18	FC Krystal Chortkiv	3,600	Kharchovyk Stadium	
19	FC Temp Shepetivka		Temp Stadium Enerhetyk Stadium, Netishyn Keramik Stadium, Baranivka	home stadium Used in 25th round Used in 41st, 42nd rounds
20	FC Pryladyst Mukacheve		Pryladyst Stadium Spartak Stadium	home stadium Used in 23rd, 24th, 27th, 28th rounds
21	FC Artania Ochakiv		Artania Stadium Sokil Stadium	home stadium Used in 24th, 26th, 29th, 30th, 34th rounds
22	FC Avtomobilist Sumy		Avanhard Stadium Frunzenets Stadium Kolos Stadium Kharchovyk Stadium	home stadium Used in 20th round Used in 24th, 27th, 28th rounds Used in 31st round
23	FC Shakhtar Pavlohrad		Shakhtar Stadium Prometei Stadium Hirnyk Stadium	home stadium Used in 29th, 30th, 33rd, 34th, 38th rounds Used in 37th round
24	FC Polihraftekhnika Oleksandria	? 7,000	Olimp Stadium Shakhtar Stadium	home stadium Used in 25th, 26th, 29th, 30th, 40th, 43rd rounds

=== Managers ===
Rank	Club	Managers	Replaced managers
1	FC Vorskla Poltava	(Azerbaijan) Vladimir Brukhti	
2	FC Dynamo-2 Kyiv	(Ukraine) Volodymyr Onyshchenko	
3	FC Evis Mykolaiv	(Ukraine) Leonid Koltun	(Ukraine) Vladlen Naumenko
4	SC Odesa	(Ukraine) Serhiy Zharkov (playing)	(Ukraine) Volodymyr Smarovoz
5	FC Nyva Vinnytsia	(Ukraine) Yukhym Shkolnykov	
6	FC Ros Bila Tserkva	(Ukraine) Viktor Dubyno	(Ukraine) Stanislav Honcharenko
7	FC Desna Chernihiv	(Ukraine) Yuriy Hruznov	
8	FC Zakarpattia Uzhhorod	(Ukraine) Yuriy Chyrkov	
9	FC Nord-Am Podillya Khmelnytskyi	(Ukraine) Yevhen Lemeshko	(Ukraine) Yuriy Avanesov (Ukraine) Viktor Matviyenko
10	FC Stal Alchevsk	(Ukraine) Anatoliy Volobuyev	
11	FC Prykarpattia Ivano-Frankivsk	(Latvia) Viktors Ņesterenko	
12	FC Metalurh Nikopol	(Ukraine) Volodymyr Nechayev	
14	FC Skala Stryi	(Ukraine) Yuriy Shulyatytskyi	(Ukraine) Andriy Karimov
15	FC Naftovyk Okhtyrka	(Ukraine) Hennadiy Makarov	
16	FC Khimik Severodonetsk	(Ukraine) Stanislav Honcharenko	(Ukraine) Yuriy Vankevych
18	FC Krystal Chortkiv	(Ukraine) Ivan Hakman	
19	FC Temp Shepetivka	(Ukraine) Leonid Tkachenko	(Ukraine) Zaya Avdysh (Ukraine) Yuriy Voynov (Uzbekistan) Sergei Dotsenko
20	FC Pryladyst Mukacheve	(Russia) István Szekecs	
21	FC Artania Ochakiv	(Ukraine) Valery Zhuravko	
22	FC Avtomobilist Sumy	(Ukraine) Valeriy Bermudes	(Ukraine) Mykhailo Fomenko
23	FC Shakhtar Pavlohrad	(Ukraine) Anatoliy Kesküla (Anatoliy Kieskiula)	
24	FC Polihraftekhnika Oleksandria	(Ukraine) Yuriy Koval	

== Final standings ==
Pos	Team	Pld	W	D	L	GF	GA	GD	Pts	Promotion or relegation
1	Nyva Vinnytsia (C, P)	42	24	14	4	73	26	+47	62	Promoted to Vyshcha Liha
2	Temp Shepetivka (P)	42	25	8	9	68	48	+20	58	Promoted to Vyshcha Liha
3	Naftovyk Okhtyrka	42	22	10	10	73	41	+32	54	
4	Vorskla Poltava	42	21	9	12	57	46	+11	51	
5	Prykarpattia Ivano-Frankivsk	42	18	14	10	53	35	+18	50	
6	Polihraftekhnika Oleksandria	42	19	10	13	69	39	+30	48	
7	Evis Mykolaiv	42	18	11	13	60	39	+21	47	
8	Nord-Am-Podillia Khmelnytskyi	42	15	16	11	45	39	+6	46	
9	Khimik Siverodonetsk	42	17	9	16	66	65	+1	43	
10	Stal Alchevsk	42	16	10	16	40	37	+3	42	
11	Skala Stryi	42	15	11	16	49	58	−9	41	
12	SC Odesa	42	15	10	17	54	61	−7	40	
13	Metalurh Nikopol	42	13	14	15	43	50	−7	40	
14	Krystal Chortkiv	42	14	9	19	37	61	−24	37	
15	Dynamo-2 Kyiv	42	10	17	15	48	39	+9	37	
16	Zakarpattia Uzhhorod	42	13	10	19	45	56	−11	36	
17	Avtomobilist Sumy	42	13	10	19	39	61	−22	36	
18	Artania Ochakiv	42	15	5	22	42	73	−31	35	
19	Desna Chernihiv	42	13	9	20	42	49	−7	35	
20	Pryladyst Mukacheve	42	12	11	19	38	53	−15	35	
21	Ros Bila Tserkva (R)	42	10	15	17	40	48	−8	35	Relegated to Second League
22	Shakhtar Pavlohrad (R)	42	6	4	32	35	92	−57	16	Relegated to Second League

Source: uafootball.net.ua
(C) Champions; (P) Promoted; (R) Relegated

== Top scorers ==
Statistics are taken from here.

	Scorer	Goals (Pen.)	Team
1	(Ukraine) Roman Hryhorchuk	26 (9)	Prykarpattia Ivano-Frankivsk
1	(Ukraine) Ihor Koliada	26 (12)	Temp Shepetivka
3	(Ukraine) Yuriy Ovcharenko	24	Desna / Nyva
4	(Ukraine) Oleksandr Pindeyev	17 (1)	Vorskla Poltava
4	(Ukraine) Ruslan Zabranskyi	17 (4)	Evis Mykolaiv
6	(Ukraine) Volodymyr Tymchenko	15	Odesa / Podillya
6	(Ukraine) Borys Shurshyn	15 (2)	Naftovyk Okhtyrka
6	(Ukraine) Yuriy Mykolayenko	15 (7)	Nyva Vinnytsia
9	(Belarus) Georgi Kondratiev	14	Temp Shepetivka
9	(Ukraine) Volodymyr Maksymov	14 (3)	Polihraftekhnika Oleksandria
9	(Ukraine) Vitaliy Kosovskyi	14 (4)	Nyva Vinnytsia

== See also ==
- 1992–93 Ukrainian Premier League
- 1992–93 Ukrainian Second League
- 1992–93 Ukrainian Transitional League
- 1992–93 Ukrainian Cup
