= Football in Ukraine =

- NSC Olimpiyskiy Stadium in Kyiv
- Country: Ukraine
- Governing body: Ukrainian Association of Football
- National team: Ukraine

National competitions
- FIFA World Cup; UEFA European Championship; UEFA Nations League

Club competitions
- List: League: Ukrainian Premier League Ukrainian First League Ukrainian Second League Ukrainian Amateur Football League; Cups: Ukrainian Cup Ukrainian Super Cup

International competitions
- FIFA Club World Cup; FIFA Intercontinental Cup; UEFA Champions League; UEFA Europa League; UEFA Conference League; UEFA Super Cup

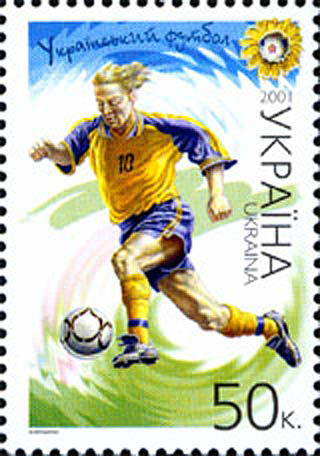
Postage stamp of Ukraine, 2001

Football is the most popular sport in Ukraine. Over half of the people in Ukraine are interested in football. The Ukrainian Association of Football (previously Football Federation of Ukraine) is the national governing body and is responsible for overseeing all aspects of football game in the country. It was organised in 1991 to replace the Soviet republican-level Football Federation of Ukrainian SSR, created earlier in the 1920s as part of the Soviet system of physical culture councils. The Ukrainian Association of Football is a non-governmental organization and is a member of the National Olympic Committee of Ukraine.

There are several types of football: professional male and female football, amateur male and female football, youth leagues and children's competitions (younger than age of 13), football veterans and beach football, indoor competition and separate competitions for students and military personnel. Ukraine fields a great number of different national teams for various types of international competitions including continental and world qualifications, Universiades, youth competitions, and international competitions for beach and indoor football.

== Summary ==
The Ukraine national senior team has qualified for the FIFA World Cup once, in 2006, where they reached the quarter-finals led by the former Soviet football star player Oleh Blokhin. The team also qualified on couple of occasions to the continental championship in 2012, 2016, 2020, 2024. The Ukraine first junior team made it to the final of the 2006 UEFA European Under-21 Championship. The Ukraine second junior team won the 2009 UEFA European Under-19 Championship and made it to the finals of the FIFA U-20 World Cup. The Ukraine student team won two football tournaments at the Summer Universiade and made it to the finals of another one.

Dynamo Kyiv and Shakhtar Donetsk are among the most recognisable clubs that are from Ukraine. Dynamo Kyiv traces its fame from the Soviet times as they won the European Cup Winners' Cup twice in 1975 and 1986. In 1975 Dynamo extended its success into the UEFA Super Cup as well. In 2009 Shakhtar Donetsk won the UEFA Cup. Among the famous players to come out of Ukraine were Oleh Blokhin and Andriy Shevchenko. The legendary coach Valeri Lobanovski led Dynamo Kyiv to their European Cup victories as well as coaching the former Soviet and later on the Ukraine national football team: He is a Ukrainian football hero.

Ukrainian football professional club competitions are organised in the three-tier league system. Parallel with them there is a knockout competition the Ukrainian Cup. There is also a Super Cup match up that is being conducted on annual basis among the top two best clubs in the country. Several amateur level tournaments are played nationally as well as in every region (oblast); for more information, please see Ukrainian football league system. Female football is less developed, however there is a female national team and a two-tier league system competition for clubs. Among the most successful clubs are Lehenda Chernihiv and Zhytlobud Kharkiv.

Ukraine has also highly developed children's and youth football. There is a national competition conducted by all professional clubs of Ukraine and some better sports schools or football academies. It is a multiple tier league with several regional-based divisions. Each club is represented by four squads with players in age groups ranging from under 14 to under 17. In addition to the national youth league, the Ukrainian Premier League has own competitions for older youth players who play a day before of each UPL round competitions. Parallel to that there is an independent Student League which encompasses teams of various universities and institutions of higher education. Selected players from that league successfully compete at student Olympics, the Universiada. The regional amateur football competitions also provide training opportunities for the young soccer stars.

== History ==
Modern Ukrainian club competitions derived mostly from the Soviet competitions.

Divided at Zbruch, the first football competitions in Ukraine appeared in 1900–1910s including the portion of Ukraine that was part of the Russian Empire as well as Austria-Hungary. Competitions were conducted in main cities which were Lemberg (Lviv), Kyiv, Odesa, Kharkiv, and Donbas. Those competitions often involved participations of students or workers either factories or other major employers. In 1912 on initiative of Moscow and Petrograd football enthusiasts of foreign descent in Imperial Russia was constituted "Russian championship among cities" where each city was represented by a collective team. In Imperial Austria on the other hand at around that time started regional competitions at "crownland" level as well as a domestic cup. During the World War I competitions in both empires were suspended for a short period of time. Following the war, political situation has changed in Central Europe as the major European empires fell and were fragmented into many smaller national states. After failing to secure its independence in 1917–1920, Ukraine was torn apart by the Soviet Russia and former Russian province, the restored Poland.

The first recorded national (domestic) competition in Soviet Ukraine started in 1921 and was a competition among city teams (Championship of cities) that represented a participating city (or regional) championship. In Western Ukraine (East Galicia and Volhynia) that was part of Poland, ethnic Ukrainians declared official boycott at organization level and held separate competitions from the official Polish competitions. Later, however, some Ukrainian based clubs joined the "Piłka Nożna" (Polish football) competitions among which was Ukraina Lwów. Soon after the establishment of the Soviet Union in 1924 there was established the Soviet Championship of Cities. Unlike the Imperial Russian competitions, the Soviet competitions involved participation of national (or more correctly republican) teams. The Soviet Championship of Cities existed simultaneously along with republican level championships of cities in each union republic. In interbellum Czechoslovakia which secured control of Carpathian Ruthenia following the World War I, there existed regional competitions of eastern Slovakia and Carpathian Ruthenia and at one point local Rusj Uzgorod qualified for the Czechoslovak State League.

The organization of the Ukrainian SSR Championship of Cities was organized by the All-Ukrainian Council of Physical Culture which was a republican institution and a branch of the Soviet All-Union Council of Physical Culture. In 1936 in the Soviet Union was organized first football competitions among teams of master or so called "exhibition teams" (pokazatelnye komandy) in four groups that acted as tiers. To the new Soviet competitions were selected several teams from the Ukrainian SSR. The new Soviet reform in football also made some changes to republican competitions. The Ukrainian SSR Championship of Cities was also reformed in 1936 where each city team was competing by representing its sports society, factory, mine, port, collective farm (kolkhoz) thus transforming into so called "Championship of Sports Societies and Departments". This way some Ukrainian teams competed at All-Union level and others at republican, however all Ukrainian teams played at the Ukrainian Cup including those that played at the All-Union competitions such as Dynamo Kyiv and Stakhanovets Stalino.

During World War II, the Soviet Union annexed territories of eastern Poland, and because of that competitions in Poland were disrupted. The previous clubs of the region were dissolved as national bourgeoise clubs and replaced with newly created Soviet "proletarian" clubs such as Spartak or Dynamo. Some former Polish players from the dissolved clubs joined the new Soviet counterparts, while others moved out of the country, were deported or pursued other goals. During the Nazi occupation there was no recorded national football competitions, but there were regional competitions. Czechoslovakia that was previously partitioned by its neighbors had its Carpathian Ruthenia occupied by Hungary and teams from the region joined the Hungarian competitions. Following defeat of the Nazi Germany and its allies, the Soviet Union resumed its domestic competitions including in the newly annexed Carpathian Ruthenia.

With the transformation of the council's (All-Ukrainian Council of Physical Culture) football section into the Football Federation of the Ukrainian SSR in 1959, the Ukrainian championship was integrated into the Soviet championship of Master teams in the Class B starting from 1960, which eventually was transformed into the Soviet Second League. The Championship of Sports Societies and Departments was reorganized into competitions of physical culture collectives, better known as the republican KFK competitions. In 1990 there took another transformation in Soviet football and all republican championships were relegated to the Soviet Second League B or the lower second league, while the Soviet Second League was split into three regional groups instead of previous nine (republican-regional factor). Several former Soviet republics started the process of secession from the Union, such as the Baltic states and Georgia. In 1992 the Soviet championship ended and the 1991–92 Soviet Cup that was planned to be transformed into the CIS Cup was in reality simply an edition of the Russian Cup.

Ukrainian (Soviet) Football League structure / 1921–present
	Ukraine	Ukraine	Ukraine	Ukrainian SSR	Ukrainian SSR	Ukrainian SSR	Ukrainian SSR	World War II	Ukrainian SSR	Ukrainian SSR
Tier	2008–present	1996–2007	1992–1995	1971–1991	1964–1970	1960–1963	1945–1959	1942–1944	1936–1941	1921–1936
I	Premier League	Top League	Top League	Second League	Class B	Class B	Championship of Ukrainian SSR	▼ ???	Championship of Ukrainian SSR	City championships
II	1.League	1.League	1.League	KFK competitions	KFK competitions	Regional 1.League	Regional 1.League		Regional 1.League	Regional 1.League
III	2.League	2.League	2.League	Regional 1.League	Regional 1.League	Regional 2.League	Regional 2.League		Regional 2.League	▼ ???
IV	Amateur League	Amateur League¹ (KFK competitions)	3.League²	Regional 2.League	Regional 2.League	Regional 3.League	Regional 3.League		▼ ???
V	Regional 1.League	Regional 1.League	KFK competitions	Regional 3.League	Regional 3.League	▼ ???	▼ ???
VI	Regional 2.League^{4}	Regional 2.League^{4}	Regional 1.League	▼ ???	▼ ???
VII	Regional 3.League^{5}	Regional 3.League^{5}	Regional 2.League^{4}
VIII			Regional 3.League^{5}

¹ In 1998 KFK competitions were transformed into the Amateur Association.
² From 1993 through 1995 there existed the 3rd League. KFK competitions were grandfathered from the Soviet times.
³ In selected years there existed the supplemental 2nd League.
^{4} District 1.League and City 1.League
^{5} District 2.League and City 2.League

Note: Until 1992 the Soviet Tier III was considered as the republican competition for the Ukrainian SSR (see Ukrainian Soviet competitions). In 1992 most of the Ukrainian-based clubs that competed in the top three tiers were reorganised into the Ukrainian Supreme League, while most of the rest non-amateur clubs were organized into the Ukrainian First League.

=== Football in post Austria-Hungary Empire ===
==== Halychyna (1920–1939) ====
In the western part of Ukraine that was part of Austria-Hungary official football competitions started in 1905 when the first Lemberg city championship took place. After World War I and the fall of the empire, the West Ukraine was annexed by the Second Polish Republic. The Soviet–Ukrainian and Soviet–Polish wars prevented the competition of 1920 from taking place. At the end, only Pogoń was admitted, however, the other clubs entered the competition much later. The teams that were to enter the Polish League were Pogoń Lwów, Czarni Lwów, Polonia Przemyśl, and Rewera Stanisławów. Those are considered to be all-Polish teams consisting mostly of the Polish nationals. Pogoń Lwów was the most successful at the start of the League, winning it four times in a row 1922–1926. The club was coached then by the Austrian manager Karl Fischer. Another club Sparta Lwów made the final of the first Polish Cup competition of 1926. Ukrainian football teams like Ukraina Lwów also existed at that time, but they competed on the amateur level. The Soviet aggression of 1939 disrupted football life in the region and all of the clubs were disbanded. The Soviet administration created its own local football clubs that were part of the Soviet Volunteer Societies.

==== Bukovina (1922–1940) ====
Bukovina in the interwar period was part of Romania. There were several clubs all from Chernivtsi that participated in the Romanian football competitions. The most successful club was Dragoş Vodă Cernăuţi. It was all-Romanian club. As in Halychyna the football clubs were ethnically based. Beside the above-mentioned club there were also Jewish clubs Maccabi Cernăuți, FC Hakoah Cernauţi, Polish Polonia Cernăuţi, and German Jahn Cernăuți. From 1922 to 1932 the clubs from Chernivtsi participated annually in the Romanian championship that was organized by the Olympic-system of elimination. Since the introduction of the regular League in the national competitions those clubs disappeared. Only FC Dragoş Voda Cernauţi participated in the 1937–38 edition of the league, placing last in its group. In 1940 Bukovina became occupied by the Soviet Union and all of the previously established sport organizations were abandoned.

==== Carpathian Ruthenia (1925–1944) ====
From 1925 to 1938, this territory was part of Czechoslovakia, and later part of Hungary. The most notable club of the region at that time was SK Rusj Užhorod from Užhorod/Ungvar, later Ungvári Rusznyi. It was the only club that participated in Slovak championship from the region. The club became champion of Slovakia on two occasions: 1933 and 1936. Rusj became known in Europe as the Flying Teachers, because they were the first club that used airplanes to travel to their games. In 1938 the region became part of Hungary. In 1939 there was a tournament among seven teams of that region (Kárpátalja), the winner of which would earn the right to participate on the professional level in the Hungarian competitions. The tournament included four teams from Uzhhorod, including SC Rusj Užhorod, plus each team from Mukacheve, Chop, and Palanky. SC Rusj Užhorod won the tournament, and because of that four teams were allowed to enter the Hungarian competition from the region, two from Uzhhorod Rusj and Ungvári AC, and each from Berehove (Beregszászi FTC) and Mukacheve (Munkács SzE).

=== Soviet championship prior 1936 ===
Before the establishment of a consistent Soviet football competition in 1936, the Ukrainian SSR had its own football competition from 1921 to 1936. This competition was on a volunteer basis and were not held regularly. These football competitions were a continuation of the imperial football competitions that started at the beginning of the 20th century in the Russian Empire. The winner qualified for the All-Union competition.

The first Ukrainian championship took place in 1921, before the establishment of the Soviet Union. Not much is known of that and the following championships and nothing is known of the competitions between 1924 and 1927. Remarkable is the fact that the dominant team of that period was from Kharkiv which until 1934 was the capital of the Ukrainian SSR.

=== Soviet championship (1936–1991) ===
Until the creation of independent competitions, the Ukrainian republican championship had taken place in the Soviet First League after the World War II, the Soviet Second League (since 1963) or in the lower levels of the competition. Three to six of the best Ukrainian clubs competed in the Soviet Top League with Dynamo Kyiv competing in it consistently since its establishment; the Ukrainian champion was considered the team that has won the Ukrainian republican group which was part of the Soviet lower leagues.

Until World War II up to six clubs from Ukraine competed in the Soviet Top League. The nine non-amateur clubs from Ukraine participated in the first season of the Soviet competition: Dynamo Kyiv (I Division); Dynamo Dnipropetrovsk and Dynamo Kharkiv (II Division); Dynamo Odesa, Spartak Kharkiv, Vuhilnyki Staline, Lokomotyv Kyiv (III Division); Traktor Plant Kharkiv, Stal Dnipropetrovsk (IV Division). In 1938 the Soviet Top League was combined into the Super League with 26 clubs playing each other once. Ukraine was represented by six clubs. The following couple of years as the League was reduced only three Ukrainian teams participated in it.

A short time after World War II Ukraine was once again represented only by Dynamo Kyiv. Since 1949 and until 1964 the club was joined by Shakhtar Donetsk and Lokomotyv Kharkiv at the Top Level. In 1956 Lokomotyv was replaced by Avanhard, known today as Metalist. In 1965 Chornomorets Odesa returned to the Soviet Top League and was joined with the SCA Odesa. Since that time Ukraine had four clubs in the League. In 1967 as the Odesa Army team was relegated, Zorya Luhansk emerged and soon thereafter winning the honors. The Luhansk's team was the first club from a provincial city in the Soviet Union that earned the top award. The club success indicated the big football boom in the region. At the start of 1970 Chornomorets Odesa and Shakhtar Donetsk were replaced with Karpaty Lviv and Dnipro Dnipropetrovsk, respectively. By mid-1970s there were again six Ukraine clubs participating. Dynamo Kyiv earned the Cup Winners' Cup and the European Super Cup where in the finals it defeated FC Bayern Munich the captain of which was Franz Beckenbauer. In 1980 the representation of Ukraine was reduced back to five clubs with the classic four: Dynamo Kyiv, Shakhtar Donetsk, Chornomorets Odesa, and Dnipro Dnipropetrovsk. Since 1982, those four were joined by Metalist Kharkiv and stayed at the top level to its dissolution in 1991, coincidentally all five of them represent the five metropoleis of Ukraine with over a million in population. In 1990 Metalurh Zaporizhzhia joined the Soviet Premier League.

==== Ukrainian teams in the Soviet Top League ====
Team	Seasons	First season	Last season	Played	Won	Drawn	Lost	Goals for	Goals against	Points^{1}	1st	2nd	3rd
FC Dynamo Kyiv	54	1936	1991	1483	681	456	346	2306	1566	1810	13	11	3
FC Shakhtar Donetsk	44	1938	1991	1288	434	379	475	1522	1641	1241	-	2	2
FC Chornomorets Odesa	26	1938	1991	789	260	230	299	841	986	744	-	-	1
FC Dnipro Dnipropetrovsk	19	1972	1991	554	227	154	173	729	634	604	2	2	2
FC Metalist Kharkiv	14	1960	1991	438	133	124	181	413	530	390	-	-	-
Zorya Voroshylovgrad	14	1967	1979	412	125	135	152	416	469	377	1	-	-
Karpaty Lviv	9	1971	1980	244	68	85	91	250	301	218	-	-	-
Lokomotyv Kharkiv	4	1949	1954	114	34	23	57	112	176	91	-	-	-
SKA Odesa	2	1965	1966	68	4	19	45	38	121	27	-	-	-
Metalurh Zaporizhia	1	1991	1991	30	9	7	14	27	38	25	-	-	-
Tavriya Simferopol	1	1981	1981	34	8	7	19	27	54	23	-	-	-
Silmash Kharkiv	1	1938	1938	25	8	6	11	34	45	22	-	-	-
Lokomotyv Kyiv	1	1938	1938	25	8	5	12	43	64	21	-	-	-
Spartak Kharkiv	1	1938	1938	25	5	7	13	43	63	17	-	-	-

^{1}Two points for a win. In 1973, a point for a draw was awarded only to a team that won the subsequent penalty shootout. In 1978–1988, the number of draws for which points were awarded was limited.

==== Ukrainian teams in the Soviet First League ====
Club	Winners	Runners-Up	3rd Position
Chernomorets Odesa	4	1	3
Lokomotiv Kharkiv	3	–	–
Karpaty Lviv	2	1	–
Zarya Lugansk	2	–	–
Dnepr Dnipro	1	3	1
Shakhter Donetsk	1	2	1
Metallist Kharkiv	1	–	2
Metallurg Zaporizhia	1	–	2
Tavriya Simferopol	1	–	2
SKA Odesa	–	2	1
Spartak Ivano-Frankovsk	–	1	–
Spartak Lviv	–	1	–
Sudostroitel Nikolayev	–	1	–
SKA Kyiv	–	–	4
SKA Karpaty Lviv	–	–	2
Lokomotiv Vinnitsa	–	–	2
SKCF Sevastopol	–	–	1
Kolos Nikopol	–	–	1

FC Dynamo Dnipropetrovsk, FC Dynamo Kharkiv, FC Silmash Kharkiv, Sudnobudivnyk Mykolaiv, FC Lokomotyv Kyiv, FC Dnipro Dnipropetrovsk, FC Zorya Luhansk, Spartak Kharkiv, Kharchovyk Odesa, FC Shakhtar Donetsk, FC Lokomotyv Kharkiv, SKA Kyiv, Spartak Lviv, FC Krystal Kherson, FC Hoverla Uzhhorod, FC Metalist Kharkiv, FC Dynamo Luhansk, Bilshovyk Zaporizhia, Lokomotyv Zaporizhia, FC Avanhard Kramatorsk, FC Shakhtar Stakhanov, FC Mukacheve, Spartak Kyiv, Torpedo Kharkiv, Dynamo Chernivtsi, SKA Lviv, Trudovi Rezervy Luhansk, FC Metalurh Zaporizhia, SKCF Sevastopol, FC Spartak Ivano-Frankivsk, Kolos Poltava, SC Prometei Dniprodzerzhynsk, FC Zirka Kirovohrad, FC Dnipro Cherkasy, SC Tavriya Simferopol, FC Nyva Vinnytsia, FC Veres Rivne, FC Lokomotyv Donetsk, SKA Odesa, Temp Kyiv, FC Polissya Zhytomyr, FC Kryvbas Kryvyi Rih, FC Chornomorets Odesa, FC Avanhard Ternopil, FC Shakhtar Horlivka, FC Bukovyna Chernivtsi, FC Volyn Lutsk, Naftovyk Drohobych, FC Desna Chernihiv, FC Podillya Khmelnytskyi, FC Sirius Zhovti Vody, FC Illichivets Mariupol, FC Khimik Sieverodonetsk, FC Frunzenets-Liha-99 Sumy, Trubnyk Nikopol, FC Hirnyk Kryvyi Rih, Shakhtar Oleksandriya, FC Karpaty Lviv, FC Kremin Kremenchuk, FC Elektrometalurh-NZF Nikopol.

Notes:

- In **bold** are clubs that later also participated in the Ukrainian Premier League. In **bold and italic** are members of both Soviet and Ukrainian Top leagues.

=== The first decade (1992–2000) ===
The independent championship was hastily organized at the start of the spring of 1992 after creation of the Ukrainian Premier League. The League was created out of the six teams that took part in the Soviet Top League, two teams from the Soviet First League, and nine out of eleven out of the Soviet Second League. The other two of that eleven were placed in the Ukrainian Persha Liha as they were to be relegated no matter what. Also the two best teams of the Soviet Second League B of the Ukrainian Zone were placed in the Ukrainian Premier League along with the winner of the 1991 Ukrainian Cup holder that placed ninth in the same group. The 20 participants were split in two groups with winners playing for the champion title and runners-up for the third place. Three teams from each group were to be relegated. As was expected, the five favorites, Dynamo Kyiv, Shakhtar Donetsk, Chornomorets Odesa, Dnipro Dnipropetrovsk, and Metalist Kharkiv placed at the top of each group. In the championship play-off game in Lviv, a sensation took place as the Tavriya Simferopol beat Dynamo Kyiv 1–0. The Creamians earned the first Ukrainian title (thus far the only), losing only once to FC Temp Shepetivka.

After being stunned in the first championship by the tragedy in Lviv, Dynamo Kyiv was anxious to earn its first title on the second go. In the second championship that had a regular League format of 16 teams, the main rival of the Kyivans was Dnipro Dnipropetrovsk which won the first half of the season. By the end of the season both teams were going shoulder to shoulder and at the end they finished with the same number of earned points. The champion title was awarded to Dynamo Kyiv as they had better goal difference. Neither the Golden match or the fact that Dnipro had a better head-to-head record was considered.

The next seven years were known as the total hegemony of Dynamo Kyiv. During this period the Soviet stereotypes changed as some of the best teams were going into a crisis. After the 1993–94 season suddenly Metalist Kharkiv was relegated to the Persha Liha. In the 1995–96 season Shakhtar Donetsk had its worst year in the club's history, placing tenth. Chornomorets Odesa was relegated twice during that first decade after Leonid Buriak left the team. Also couple of newly created teams have emerged, Arsenal Kyiv and Metalurh Donetsk and, in addition, FC Vorskla Poltava has astonished everyone placing the third in the first club's season at the Top Level in 1997.

=== The decade of Kyiv–Donetsk stand-off (2001–2010) ===
The next decade was marked by fierce competition between Dynamo Kyiv and Shakhtar Donetsk. Since 2000, Donetsk club proved to be the real challengers to Kyiv's dominance. In 2000 Shakhtar earned their first qualification to the Champions League and their place in the Group stage. Nonetheless, Dynamo is still considered the standard of excellence in the country and the primary feeder to the Ukraine national football team. 2002 became the real cornerstone in the miners history when they earned their first national title under the management of the newly appointed Italian specialist, Nevio Scala, who managed to bring the Donetsk club to its next Ukrainian Cup title as well. Since that time the issue of foreign players became particularly acute and brought series of court cases (see Players section). The FFU and PFL worked together to solve that issue, coming with the plan to force the transitional limitation of the foreign players over the time.

The clubs such as Dnipro and Chornomorets recent contenders for the title had to put up a fierce competition against the newly established contenders Metalurh from Donetsk and Metalist from Kharkiv to qualify for the European competitions. FC Metalist Kharkiv did exceptionally well in the late 2000s, consistently placing right behind Dynamo and Shakhtar. Most remarkable was their participation in the 2009 European season when they had to compete against Dynamo Kyiv to advance to the Quarter-finals of the UEFA Cup 2009. Later the UEFA Cup edition was won for the first time by the Shakhtar Donetsk, the first club of the independent Ukraine.

=== Latest wins and events ===
UEFA Euro 2012 or simply Euro 2012, was the 14th European Championship for men's national football teams organised by UEFA and was co-hosted for the first time by Poland and Ukraine. Poland and Ukraine's bid was chosen by UEFA's executive committee in 2007.

In May 2015, Dnipro Dnipropetrovsk reached their first Europa League final after defeating Napoli 1–0 in Kyiv.

=== Performance of Ukraine-based professional clubs in Soviet Top League and Ukrainian Premier League ===
Club	Winners	Runners-Up	3rd Position	Seasons Won
Dynamo Kyiv	29	22	4	1961, 1966, 1967, 1968, 1971, 1974, 1975, 1977, 1980, 1981, 1985, 1986, 1990, 1992–93, 1993–94, 1994–95, 1995–96, 1996–97, 1997–98, 1998–99, 1999–00, 2000–01, 2002–03, 2003–04, 2006–07, 2008–09, 2014–15, 2015–16, 2020–21
Shakhtar Donetsk	13	15	2	2001–02, 2004–05, 2005–06, 2007–08, 2009–10, 2010–11, 2011–12, 2012–13, 2013–14, 2016–17, 2017–18, 2018–19, 2019–20
Dnipro	2	4	9	1983, 1988
Zorya Luhansk	1	0	3	1972
Tavriya Simferopol	1	0	0	1992
Chornomorets Odesa	0	2	4	
Metalist Kharkiv	0	1	6	
Metalurh Donetsk	0	0	3	
Kryvbas Kryvyi Rih	0	0	2	
Vorskla Poltava	0	0	2	
Karpaty Lviv	0	0	1	
Oleksandriya	0	0	1	

=== Performance of Ukraine-based professional clubs in Soviet Cup and Ukrainian Cup ===
Team	Winners	Runners-up	Winning Years
Dynamo Kyiv	21	6	1954, 1964, 1966, 1974, 1978, 1982, 1985, 1987, 1990, 1993, 1996, 1998, 1999, 2000, 2003, 2005, 2006, 2007, 2014, 2015, 2020
Shakhtar Donetsk	17	10	1961, 1962, 1980, 1983, 1995, 1997, 2001, 2002, 2004, 2008, 2011, 2012, 2013, 2016, 2017, 2018, 2019
Chornomorets Odesa	2	1	1992, 1994
Dnipro	1	3	1989
Karpaty Lviv	1	2	1969
Metalist Kharkiv	1	2	1988
Tavriya Simferopol	1	1	2010
Vorskla Poltava	1	1	2009
Zorya Luhansk	–	3	—
Metalurh Donetsk	–	2	—
Arsenal Kyiv (Note: previously, also known as CSKA Kyiv)	–	2	—
Kryvbas Kryvyi Rih	–	1	—
Metalurh Zaporizhya	–	1	—
Nyva Vinnytsia	–	1	—
Inhulets Petrove	–	1	—

=== Performance of Ukraine-based professional clubs in Soviet Super Cup and Ukrainian Super Cup ===
Club	Winners	Runners-up	Winning years
Dynamo Kyiv	12	6	1981, 1986, 1987, 2004, 2006, 2007, 2009, 2011, 2016, 2018, 2019, 2020
Shakhtar Donetsk	9	10	1984, 2005, 2008, 2010, 2012, 2013, 2014, 2015, 2017
Dnipro	1	1	1988
Metalist Kharkiv	—	1	
Vorskla Poltava	—	1	
Tavriya Simferopol	—	1	
Metalurh Donetsk	—	1	
Chornomorets Odesa	—	1	

=== National league titles by Region and Championship ===
The following table lists the Ukraine-based football champions by the Ukrainian regions.

Region	(Ukraine)	(Soviet Union)
City of Kyiv	16	13
Donetsk Oblast	13	—
Dnipropetrovsk Oblast	—	2
AR Crimea	1	—
Luhansk Oblast	—	1

== European competitions ==
=== UEFA Champions League ===
The following teams have qualified for elimination rounds in the UEFA Champions League.

- Dynamo Kyiv (1972–73, 1975–76, 1981–82, 1982–83, 1984–85, 1997–98 – Quarter-finals, 1976–77, 1986–87, 1998–99 – Semi-finals)
- Dnipro Dnipropetrovsk (1984–85, 1989–90 – Quarter-finals)
- Shakhtar Donetsk (2010–11 – Quarter-finals)

=== UEFA Cup Winners' Cup ===
The following teams have qualified for elimination rounds in the UEFA Cup Winners' Cup.

- Dynamo Kyiv (1965–66, 1990–91 – Quarter-finals, 1974–75, 1985–86 – Winner)
- Shakhtar Donetsk (1983–84 – Quarter-finals)

=== UEFA Europa League / UEFA Cup ===
The following teams have qualified for elimination rounds of the UEFA Cup.

- Shakhtar Donetsk (2008–09 – Winner; 2015–16 – Semi-finals)
- Dnipro Dnipropetrovsk (2014–15 – Finalist)
- Dynamo Kyiv (2008–09 – Semi-finals)

== Professional clubs in Ukraine ==
The professional football in Ukraine has developed its traditions within the Soviet Union republican and All-Union competitions. As the other clubs of the former Soviet Union football, it has transitioned from cities' competitions to competitions among teams of masters' which was a Soviet conditional term for professional teams. For amateur teams following the World War II, there was established a separate term, collective [teams] of physical culture [enthusiasts] or KFK (CPhC).

During 1989-1992 almost all teams of masters' have transitioned to football clubs, sports clubs or other sports-based organizations. The reason for the transition was switch from command economy of the Soviet Union to normal free market-driven economy. Some clubs have separate from their parent sports organizations such as Dynamo Kyiv (from Dynamo of Ukraine) or Shakhtar Donetsk, others were re-established anew such as Karpaty Lviv.

== Ukrainian clubs in the Soviet competitions ==
=== Ukrainian medalists of the Soviet first tier competitions ===
Club	Winners	Runners-up	Third place	Winning years
Dynamo Kyiv	13	11	3	1961, 1966, 1967, 1968, 1971, 1974, 1975, 1977, 1980, 1981, 1985, 1986, 1990
Dnipro Dnipropetrovsk	2	2	2	1983, 1988
Zorya Voroshilovgrad	1	–	–	1972
Shakhtar Donetsk	–	2	2	
Chornomorets Odesa	—	—	1	

=== All-time table of Ukrainian clubs in the Soviet first tier competitions ===
List of records of Ukrainian clubs in the Soviet first tier competitions which over the years carried different names, only since 1971 they were known as the Soviet Top League which was established in place of the Class A Top Group (First Group).

Rank	Team	Seasons	First year	Last year	P	W	D	L	GF	GA	Pts	1st	2nd	3rd	Other names used
1	FC Dynamo Kyiv	54	1936	1991	1483	681	456	346	2306	1566	1810	13	11	3	
2	FC Shakhtar Donetsk	44	1938	1991	1288	434	379	475	1522	1641	1241	–	2	2	Stakhanovets Stalino
3	FC Chornomorets Odesa	24	1965	1991	738	244	217	277	777	884	699	–	–	1	
4	FC Dnipro Dnipropetrovsk	19	1972	1991	554	227	154	173	729	634	604	2	2	2	
5	FC Metalist Kharkiv	14	1960	1991	438	133	124	181	413	530	390	–	–	–	Avanhard Kharkiv
6	FC Zorya Luhansk	14	1967	1979	412	125	135	152	416	469	377	1	–	–	Zorya Voroshylovhrad
7	FC Karpaty Lviv	9	1971	1980	244	68	85	91	250	301	218	–	–	–	
8	FC Lokomotyv Kharkiv	4	1949	1954	34	23	57	47	112	176	91	–	–	–	
9	FC Dynamo Odesa	2	1938	1939	51	16	13	22	64	102	45	–	–	–	
10	SKA Odesa	2	1965	1966	68	4	19	45	38	121	27	–	–	–	
11	FC Metalurh Zaporizhya	1	1991		30	9	7	14	27	38	25	–	–	–	
12	FC Tavriya Simferopol	1	1981		34	8	7	19	27	54	23	–	–	–	
13	FC Silmash Kharkiv	1	1938		25	8	6	11	34	45	22	–	–	–	
14	FC Lokomotyv Kyiv	1	1938		25	8	5	12	43	64	21	–	–	–	
15	FC Spartak Kharkiv	1	1938		25	5	7	13	43	63	17	–	–	–	

=== Ukrainian medalists of the Soviet second tier competitions ===
Club	Winners	Runners-up	Third place	Winning years
Chornomorets Odesa	3	1	3	1961, 1973, 1987
Karpaty Lviv	2	1	–	1970, 1979
Lokomotyv Kharkiv	2	–	1	1948, 1952
Dnipro Dnipropetrovsk	1	2	1	1971
Shakhtar Donetsk	1	1	1	1954
Tavriya Simferopol	1	–	2	1980
Metalist Kharkiv	1	–	2	1981
Metalurh Zaporizhia	1	–	2	1960
Lokomotyv Vinnytsia	1	–	1	1959
Trudovi Rezervy Luhansk	1	–	–	1962*
Zorya Luhansk	1	–	–	1966

=== All-time table of Ukrainian clubs in the Soviet second tier competitions ===
List of records of Ukrainian clubs in the Soviet second tier competitions which over the years carried different names, only since 1970 they were known as the Soviet First League which was established in place of the Class A First Group (Second Group).

Rank	Team	Seasons	First year	Last year	P	W	D	L	GF	GA	Pts	1st	2nd	3rd	Other names used
1	FC Metalurh Zaporizhia	40	1947	1990	1471	564	406	501	1918	1690	1534	1	–	2	
2	FC Dnipro Dnipropetrovsk	26	1939	1980	873	378	223	272	1226	1055	979	1	2	1	Stal Dnipropetrovsk
3	SC Tavriya Simferopol	23	1958	1991	890	343	240	307	1162	1043	926	1	–	2	
4	SKA Karpaty Lviv	23	1949	1989	813	344	202	267	1058	918	890	–	–	2	SKA Lviv, ODO Lviv, SC Lutsk
5	FC Chornomorets Odesa	22	1940	1973	703	343	164	196	1132	771	850	3	1	3	Pishchevik Odesa
6	FC Metalist Kharkiv	21	1947	1981	772	316	211	245	913	784	843	1	–	2	Avanhard Kharkiv
7	FC Zorya Voroshylovhrad	18	1939	1987	710	283	190	237	947	844	756	2	–	–	
8	SKA Kyiv	19	1947	1982	599	244	155	200	839	681	643	–	–	–	DO Kyiv, SC Chernigov
9	SKA Odesa	14	1958	1982	547	227	152	168	699	551	606	–	–	–	ODO Odesa
10	FC Prykarpattia Ivano-Frankivsk	16	1956	1981	596	206	139	251	694	840	551	–	–	–	Spartak Ivano-Frankivsk
11	FC Karpaty Lviv	12	1963	1981	451	206	121	124	629	422	533	–	–	–	
12	FC Sudnobudivnyk Mykolaiv	15	1939	1968	495	175	152	168	598	612	502	–	–	–	
13	FC Kolos Nikopol	9	1962	1987	424	170	97	157	560	527	437	–	–	–	
14	FC Nyva Vinnytsia	9	1958	1968	358	145	116	97	461	350	406	–	–	–	Lokomotyv Vinnytsia
15	FC Zakarpattia Uzhhorod	13	1947	1962	384	133	114	137	498	460	380	–	–	–	Hoverla Uzhhorod
16	FC Zirka Kirovohrad	8	1958	1968	312	127	88	97	418	330	342	–	–	–	
17	FC Krystal Kherson	9	1947	1968	316	100	91	125	389	439	291	–	–	–	Lokomotyv Kherson
18	SKChF Sevastopol	9	1954	1968	300	97	78	125	373	402	272	–	–	–	
19	FC Kolos Poltava	7	1957	1968	280	91	83	106	308	335	265	–	–	–	
20	FC Polissya Zhytomyr	5	1959	1968	210	93	53	64	284	202	239	–	–	–	
21	FC Kryvbas Kryvyi Rih	8	1959	1977	297	77	79	141	326	453	233	–	–	–	
22	FC Lokomotyv Kharkiv	7	1945	1955	178	93	45	40	334	176	231	–	–	–	
23	FC Shakhtar Stakhanov	8	1948	1962	286	79	73	134	286	410	231	–	–	–	
24	FC Shakhtar Donetsk	7	1959	1968	163	94	41	28	324	134	229	–	–	–	
25	FC Bukovyna Chernivtsi	5	1960	1991	184	73	47	64	227	227	193	–	–	–	
26	FC Novator Zhdanov	5	1960	1969	193	61	65	67	193	218	187	–	–	–	
27	FC Avanhard Zhovti Vody	5	1960	1968	189	58	68	63	181	193	184	–	–	–	
28	FC Lokomotyv Donetsk	5	1958	1962	162	69	43	50	254	227	181	–	–	–	
29	FC Khimik Severodonetsk	5	1960	1969	193	60	52	81	193	246	172	–	–	–	
30	SC Prometei Dniprodzerzhynsk	6	1957	1962	198	49	56	93	192	295	154	–	–	–	
31	FC Avanhard Rivne	5	1958	1962	158	56	40	62	246	262	152	–	–	–	
32	FC Dnipro Cherkasy	5	1958	1962	158	49	54	55	160	186	152	–	–	–	
33	FC Avanhard Ternopil	5	1959	1969	170	51	49	70	177	233	151	–	–	–	Budivelnyk Ternopil
34	FC Arsenal Kyiv	4	1959	1962	128	49	41	38	191	141	139	–	–	–	
35	FC Avanhard Kramatorsk	5	1948	1962	154	49	37	68	191	250	135	–	–	–	
36	FC Desna Chernihiv	4	1960	1969	142	40	48	54	156	212	128	–	–	–	
37	FC Shakhtar Horlivka	4	1959	1962	132	40	38	54	156	202	118	–	–	–	
38	FC Podillya Khmelnytskyi	4	1960	1969	142	37	43	62	144	203	117	–	–	–	Dynamo Khmelnytskyi
39	FC Torpedo Kharkiv	4	1949	1962	140	37	42	61	157	230	116	–	–	–	
40	FC Spartak Lviv	3	1947	1949	78	41	15	22	153	112	97	–	–	–	
41	FC Frunzenets Sumy	3	1960	1962	106	23	41	42	113	154	87	–	–	–	
42	FC Bilshovyk Mukacheve	2	1948	1949	51	31	7	13	108	60	69	–	–	–	
43	FC Naftovyk Drohobych	3	1960	1962	100	22	24	54	98	182	68	–	–	–	
44	FC Volyn Lutsk	3	1960	1962	100	20	25	55	97	163	65	–	–	–	
45	FC Dynamo Kharkiv	3	1936	1940	55	23	13	19	90	77	59	–	–	–	
46	FC Lokomotyv Kyiv	2	1939	1940	48	22	6	20	73	67	50	–	–	–	
47	FC Dynamo Voroshylovhrad	3	1947	1949	72	14	19	39	97	160	47	–	–	–	
48	FC Silmash Kharkiv	3	1936	1940	55	16	10	29	85	102	42	–	–	–	
49	FC Dnipro Kremenchuk	1	1968		45	9	15	21	28	50	33	–	–	–	
50	FC Shakhtar Oleksandriya	1	1962		34	10	10	14	34	45	30	–	–	–	
51	FC Spartak Kyiv	1	1949		34	11	8	15	43	57	30	–	–	–	
52	FC Dynamo Chernivtsi	1	1949		34	8	10	16	39	52	26	–	–	–	
53	FC Spartak Kharkiv	1	1939		22	8	1	13	35	45	17	–	–	–	
54	FC Dynamo Dnipropetrovsk	1	1936		7	2	1	4	7	14	5	–	–	–	

=== Ukrainian medalists of the Soviet third tier competitions ===
Club	Winners	Runners-up	Third place	Winning years
Kryvbas Kryvyi Rih	4*	–	1*	1971, 1975, 1976, 1981
Bukovyna Chernivtsi	3*	3*	–	1982, 1988, 1990
Tavriya Simferopol	3*	2*	1*	1973, 1985, 1987
SKA Kiev	2*	4*	2*	1980, 1983
Nyva Vinnytsia	2*	3*	1*	1964, 1984
SKA Odesa	2*	–	2*	1963, 1977
Spartak Ivano-Frankivsk	2*	–	1*	1969, 1972
Avtomobilist Zhytomyr	1*	2*	3*	1967
Metalist Kharkiv	1*	2*	–	1978
Sudnobudivnyk Mykolaiv	1*	1*	3*	1974
Kolos Nikopol	1*	1*	1*	1979
Hoverla Uzhhorod	1*	1*	–	1946
Zorya Voroshylovhrad	1*	1	–	1986
SKA Lvov	1*	–	3*	1965
Karpaty Lviv	1	–	2*	1991
Dynamo Odesa	1	–	1	1937
Avanhard Zhovti Vody	1*	–	1*	1966
Avanhard Ternopil	1*	–	–	1968
Metalurh Zaporizhia	1*	–	–	1970
Volyn Lutsk	1*	–	–	1989
Kolos Mezhyrich	–	2*	1*	
Nyva Ternopil	–	1*	1*	
Spartak Kharkiv	–	1	–	
Lokomotyv Kyiv	–	1	–	
Dynamo Khmelnytskyi	–	1*	–	
Khimik Severodonetsk	–	1*	–	
Shakhtar Horlivka	–	1*	–	
Desna Chernihiv	–	1*	–	
Vorskla Poltava	–	1*	–	
Dynamo Dnipropetrovsk	–	–	1	
Stakhanovets Stalino	–	–	1	
Azovstal Mariupol	–	–	1*	
Lokomotyv Kherson	–	–	1*	
Dnipro Kremenchuk	–	–	1*	
Shakhtar Kadiivka	–	–	1*	
Spartak Sumy	–	–	1*	
Avanhard Rivne	–	–	1*	

=== All-time table of Ukrainian clubs in the Soviet third tier competitions ===
List of records of Ukrainian clubs in the Soviet third tier competitions which over the years carried different names, only since 1970 they were known as the Soviet Second League which was established in place of the Class A Second Group.

Rank	Team	Seasons	First year	Last year	P	W	D	L	GF	GA	Pts	1st	2nd	3rd	Other names used
1	FC Bukovyna Chernivtsi	26	1963	1989	1176	508	318	350	1466	1117	1842	3	3	–	
2	FC Polissya Zhytomyr	24	1963	1988	1086	455	310	321	1294	986	1675	1	2	3	Avtomobilist Zhytomyr
3	FC Kryvbas Kryvyi Rih	22	1963	1988	1003	428	295	280	1267	967	1579	4	–	1	
4	FC Sudnobudivnyk Mykolaiv	23	1963	1989	1043	425	295	323	1257	1003	1570	1	1	3	
5	FC Zakarpattia Uzhhorod	26	1963	1989	1155	426	291	438	1235	1288	1569	1	1	–	
6	FC Nyva Vinnytsia	22	1963	1990	1003	428	286	289	1231	885	1567	2	3	1	Lokomotyv Vinnytsia
7	FC Podillya Khmelnytskyi	24	1963	1988	1084	404	286	394	1191	1167	1498	–	1	–	Dynamo Khmelnytskyi
8	FC Volyn Lutsk	27	1963	1990	1206	386	332	488	1148	1416	1490	1	–	–	
9	FC Avanhard Rovno	25	1963	1988	1113	388	309	416	1097	1152	1473	–	–	1	Horyn Rovno
10	FC Krystal Kherson	24	1963	1988	1076	387	289	400	1233	1270	1450	–	–	1	Lokomotyv Kherson
11	FC Zirka Kirovohrad	22	1963	1988	996	377	271	348	1088	1061	1402	–	–	–	
12	FC Shakhtar Horlivka	23	1963	1987	1041	360	298	383	1135	1215	1378	–	1	–	
13	FC Chaika Sevastopol	22	1963	1988	994	355	270	369	1092	1126	1335	–	–	–	
14	FC Vorskla Poltava	22	1963	1990	992	341	277	374	1003	1076	1300	–	1	–	Kolos Poltava
15	SKA Kiev	17	1963	1986	769	365	204	200	1124	738	1299	2	4	2	DO Kiev, SC Chernigov
16	SKA Odesa	17	1963	1990	760	337	209	214	961	689	1220	2	–	2	ODO Odesa
17	FC Novator Zhdanov	22	1963	1988	998	308	259	431	1029	1303	1183	–	–	1	
18	FC Desna Chernihiv	19	1963	1988	865	306	237	322	889	929	1155	–	1	–	
19	FC Prykarpattia Ivano-Frankivsk	17	1963	1988	789	305	219	265	862	793	1134	2	–	1	
20	FC Frunzenets Sumy	20	1963	1982	896	270	271	355	848	1011	1081	–	–	1	
21	FC Dnipro Cherkasy	18	1963	1988	826	244	233	349	721	953	965	–	–	–	
22	FC Shakhtar Stakhanov	17	1963	1986	734	254	188	292	763	854	950	–	–	1	
23	FC Okean Kerch	17	1963	1988	777	223	202	352	728	979	871	–	–	–	
24	SC Tavriya Simferopol	10	1963	1987	448	234	118	96	773	422	820	3	2	1	
25	SKA Karpaty Lvov	11	1963	1990	484	193	140	151	610	486	719	1	–	3	ODO Lvov, SKA Lvov, SC Lutsk
26	FC Nyva Ternopil	8	1983	1990	406	190	109	107	562	395	679	–	1	1	
27	FC Budivelnyk Ternopil	10	1963	1973	466	168	152	146	507	443	653	1	–	–	
28	FC Kolos Pavlohrad	8	1981	1988	410	172	86	152	522	504	602	–	2	1	Kolos Mezhyrich
29	FC Lokomotyv Donetsk	9	1963	1972	425	142	119	164	426	476	545	–	–	–	Lokomotyv Artemivsk
30	FC Dnipro Kremenchuk	8	1963	1990	377	138	104	135	396	414	518	–	–	1	Dnipro Kremenchuk
31	FC Khimik Severodonetsk	7	1963	1972	343	127	109	107	427	373	490	–	1	–	
32	FC Mayak Kharkiv	8	1972	1988	414	108	103	203	340	508	427	–	–	–	
33	FC Torpedo Kharkiv	6	1963	1968	283	110	91	82	280	232	421	–	–	–	
34	FC Stal Alchevsk	6	1963	1968	278	108	80	90	300	293	404	–	–	–	
35	FC Kolos Nikopol	4	1976	1979	224	115	55	54	302	196	400	1	1	1	
36	FC Zorya Voroshylovhrad	4	1985	1990	220	115	48	57	358	217	393	1	1	–	
37	FC Trubnyk Nikopol	6	1963	1968	280	90	108	82	305	252	378	–	–	–	
38	SC Prometei Dniprodzerzhynsk	7	1963	1969	283	97	85	101	294	290	376	–	–	–	
39	SCChF Sevastopol	5	1963	1967	238	100	65	73	301	216	365	–	–	–	
40	FC Shakhtar Oleksandriya	6	1963	1968	285	91	89	105	275	303	362	–	–	–	
41	FC Metalist Kharkiv	5	1974	1978	185	95	55	35	270	135	340	1	2	–	
42	FC Naftovyk Drohobych	6	1963	1968	278	85	84	109	277	321	339	–	–	–	
43	FC Kirovets Makiivka	5	1966	1972	250	89	71	90	246	241	338	–	–	–	
44	FC Torpedo Zaporizhia	5	1985	1989	276	89	71	116	311	355	338	–	–	–	
45	FC Avanhard Kramatorsk	6	1963	1968	274	85	83	106	276	316	338	–	–	–	
46	FC Metalurh Dniprodzerzhynsk	7	1979	1985	308	84	73	151	271	410	325	–	–	–	
47	FC Avanhard Zhovti Vody	5	1963	1969	197	85	55	57	216	157	310	–	–	–	
48	FC Dynamo Bila Tservka	5	1984	1988	272	73	87	112	262	336	306	–	–	–	
49	FC Naftovyk Okhtyrka	4	1986	1989	194	74	56	64	233	204	278	–	–	–	
50	FC Karpaty Lviv	3	1989	1991	126	71	30	25	171	97	243	1	–	2	
51	FC Spartak Melitopol	4	1963	1966	157	55	45	57	193	195	210	–	–	–	
52	FC Dunayets Izmail	5	1964	1968	238	52	48	138	158	335	204	–	–	–	
53	FC Shakhtar Krasnyi Luch	5	1965	1969	196	44	65	87	159	240	197	–	–	–	
54	FC Shakhtar Torez	5	1965	1969	200	41	60	99	151	286	183	–	–	–	
55	FC Torpedo Berdyansk	4	1966	1969	160	41	50	69	122	187	173	–	–	–	
56	FC Industriya Yenakiyeve	4	1963	1969	158	40	38	80	115	222	158	–	–	–	
57	FC Enerhiya Nova Kakhovka	3	1967	1969	122	30	44	48	83	113	134	–	–	–	
58	FC Pryladyst Mukachevo	2	1968	1969	87	34	27	26	92	75	129	–	–	–	
59	FC Sitall Kostiantynivka	3	1967	1969	120	30	35	55	80	134	125	–	–	–	
60	FC Shakhtar Sverdlovsk	2	1968	1969	85	32	27	26	94	80	123	–	–	–	
61	FC Avanhard Rovenky	2	1968	1969	80	30	28	22	80	67	118	–	–	–	
62	FC Shakhtar Chervonohrad	2	1968	1969	82	26	36	20	52	46	114	–	–	–	
63	FC Start Dzerzhynsk	3	1966	1968	120	26	36	58	88	164	114	–	–	–	
64	FC Kolos Yakymivka	2	1968	1969	82	27	32	23	68	60	113	–	–	–	
65	FC Shakhtar Yenakiyeve	3	1965	1967	115	26	31	58	85	181	109	–	–	–	
66	FC Stakhanovets Krasnoarmiysk	2	1968	1969	80	27	26	27	66	66	107	–	–	–	
67	FC Prohres Berdychiv	2	1968	1969	82	23	27	32	70	103	96	–	–	–	
68	FC Lokomotyv Dnipropetrovsk	2	1968	1969	80	19	37	24	57	56	94	–	–	–	
69	FC Podillya Kamienets-Podilskyi	2	1968	1969	82	21	29	32	60	81	92	–	–	–	
70	FC Metalurh Zaporizhia	1	1970		42	26	10	6	73	33	88	1	–	–	
71	FC Avtomobilist Odesa	2	1965	1966	77	16	21	40	57	119	69	–	–	–	
72	FC Temp Kyiv	1	1964		38	17	10	11	48	33	61	–	–	–	
73	FC Avanhard Antratsyt	1	1969		40	15	13	12	36	28	58	–	–	–	
74	FC Arsenal Kyiv	1	1963		40	14	10	16	42	43	52	–	–	–	
75	FC Stal Dnipropetrovsk	1	1967		40	13	12	15	39	37	51	–	–	–	
76	FC Budivelnyk Pervomaisk	1	1969		40	10	16	14	22	37	46	–	–	–	
77	FC Dzerzhynets Dzerzhynsk	1	1969		40	12	8	20	31	50	44	–	–	–	
78	FC Dynamo Odesa	3	1936 (s)	1937	23	13	3	7	47	27	42	1	–	1	
79	FC Dynamo-2 Kyiv	1	1965		38	11	9	18	44	66	42	–	–	–	
80	FC Stakhanovets Stalino	3	1936 (s)	1937	23	9	5	9	45	51	32	–	–	–	Ugolschiki Stalino
81	FC Spartak Kharkiv	3	1936 (s)	1937	23	9	5	9	38	48	32	–	–	–	
82	FC Dynamo Dnipropetrovsk	2	1936 (f)	1937	16	9	1	6	32	29	28	–	–	–	
83	FC Lokomotyv Kyiv	2	1936 (s)	1937	16	7	1	8	27	25	22	–	–	–	
84	FC Shakhtar Novovolynsk	1	1968		42	5	7	30	19	80	22	–	–	–	
85	FC Dynamo Kharkiv	2	1936 (f)	1937	16	4	3	9	26	35	15	–	–	–	
86	FC Silmash Kharkiv	1	1937		9	3	1	5	16	29	10	–	–	–	

=== Ukrainian medalists of the Soviet fourth and lower tiers competitions ===
Club	Winners	Runners-up	Third place	Winning years
Traktornyi zavod Kharkiv	2	–	–	1936 (s), 1936 (f)
Khimik Severodonetsk	1*	–	–	1970
Torpedo Zaporizhia	1*	–	–	1990
Naftovyk Okhtyrka	1*	–	–	1991
Stal Dnipropetrovsk	–	1	–	
Lokomotyv Vinnytsia	–	1*	–	
Sudnobudivnyk Mykolaiv	–	1*	–	
Prykarpattia Ivano-Frankivsk	–	1*	–	
Lokomotyv Kyiv	–	–	1	
Lokomotyv Donetsk	–	–	1*	
Avanhard Rivne	–	–	1*	
Kolos Nikopol	–	–	1*	
Lokomotyv Dnipropetrovsk	–	1 (V)	–	

=== All-time table of Ukrainian clubs in the Soviet fourth and lower tiers competitions ===
List of records of Ukrainian clubs in the Soviet fourth and lower tiers competitions which over the years carried different names, only since 1970 they were known as the Soviet Second League B. In 1937 there also existed fifth tier.

Rank	Team	Seasons	First year	Last year	P	W	D	L	GF	GA	Pts	1st	2nd	3rd	Other names used
1	FC Avanhard Rivno	3	1970	1991	126	63	38	25	168	106	227	–	–	1	
2	FC Podillya Khmelnytskyi	3	1970	1991	126	47	36	43	140	125	177	–	–	–	
3	FC Naftovyk Okhtyrka	2	1990	1991	86	46	27	13	132	63	165	1	–	–	
4	FC Pryladyst Mukachevo	2	1970	1991	90	43	27	20	118	78	156	–	–	–	
5	FC Prykarpattia Ivano-Frankivsk	2	1990	1991	86	46	17	23	118	75	155	–	1	–	
6	FC Dnipro Cherkasy	3	1970	1991	126	40	31	55	122	149	151	–	–	–	
7	FC Polissya Zhytomyr	2	1990	1991	86	45	12	29	117	93	147	–	–	–	
8	FC Krystal Kherson	2	1990	1991	86	41	24	21	143	104	147	–	–	–	
9	FC Kolos Nikopol	2	1990	1991	86	41	22	23	129	85	145	–	–	1	
10	FC Khimik Severodonetsk	2	1970	1991	90	38	28	24	118	90	142	1	–	–	
11	FC Dynamo Bila Tserkva	2	1990	1991	86	39	16	31	106	88	133	–	–	–	
12	FC Zakarpattia Uzhhorod	2	1970	1991	90	39	15	36	95	93	132	–	–	–	
13	FC Desna Chernihiv	2	1990	1991	86	33	15	38	94	98	114	–	–	–	
14	FC Stal Alchevsk	2	1970	1991	90	28	25	37	96	115	109	–	–	–	Komunarets Komunarsk
15	FC Kryvbas Kryvyi Rih	2	1990	1991	86	29	19	38	115	117	106	–	–	–	
16	SKA Kiev	2	1990	1991	86	25	24	37	88	101	99	–	–	–	
17	FC Chaika Sevastopol	2	1990	1991	86	24	23	39	93	123	95	–	–	–	
18	FC Okean Kerch	2	1990	1991	86	22	19	45	80	127	85	–	–	–	
19	FC Nyva Vinnytsia	1	1970		40	22	15	3	60	17	81	–	–	–	
20	FC Lokomotyv Donetsk	1	1970		40	23	9	8	66	30	78	–	–	–	
21	FC Sudnobudivnyk Mykolaiv	1	1990		36	24	5	7	60	31	77	–	–	–	
22	FC Torpedo Zaporizhia	1	1990		36	23	8	5	53	25	77	–	–	–	
23	FC Zirka Kirovohrad	2	1990	1991	86	19	20	47	87	151	77	–	–	–	
24	FC Avtomobilist Sumy	1	1991		50	20	14	16	51	40	74	–	–	–	
25	FC Temp Shepetivka	1	1991		50	19	15	16	64	53	72	–	–	–	
26	FC Avanhard Antratsyt	1	1970		40	16	14	10	30	33	62	–	–	–	
27	FC Karpaty Kamianka-Buzka	1	1991		50	15	15	20	48	55	60	–	–	–	
28	FC Shakhtar Stakhanov	1	1991		50	17	8	25	56	75	59	–	–	–	
29	FC Volyn Lutsk	1	1970		40	15	14	11	35	32	59	–	–	–	
30	FC Mayak Ochakov	1	1991		50	15	10	25	51	76	55	–	–	–	
31	FC Enerhiya Nova Kakhovka	1	1970		38	14	9	15	43	43	51	–	–	–	
32	FC Avanhard Zhovti Vody	1	1970		38	13	12	13	34	26	51	–	–	–	
33	FC Shakhtar Chervonohrad	1	1970		38	13	11	14	35	33	50	–	–	–	
34	FC Avanhard Kramatorsk	1	1970		40	13	11	16	43	54	50	–	–	–	
35	FC Torpedo Berdyansk	1	1970		40	13	11	16	28	41	50	–	–	–	
36	FC Kirovets Makiivka	1	1970		40	12	13	15	33	41	49	–	–	–	
37	FC Naftovyk Drohobych	1	1970		38	13	8	17	40	51	47	–	–	–	
38	FC Shakhtar Kirovsk	1	1970		38	12	11	15	33	48	47	–	–	–	
39	FC Shakhtar Oleksandriya	1	1970		40	11	12	17	33	46	45	–	–	–	
40	FC Avanhard Rovenky	1	1970		40	11	10	19	35	57	43	–	–	–	
41	FC Shakhtar Krasnyi Luch	1	1970		40	10	13	17	20	51	43	–	–	–	
42	SCChF Sevastopol	1	1970		38	11	9	18	33	43	42	–	–	–	
43	FC Trubnyk Nikopol	1	1970		38	9	15	14	26	32	42	–	–	–	
44	FC Podillya Kamianets-Podilskyi	1	1970		40	10	10	20	29	48	40	–	–	–	
45	FC Mayak Kharkiv	2	1990	1991	86	6	20	60	50	169	38	–	–	–	
46	FC Shakhtar Torez	1	1970		40	7	12	21	16	44	33	–	–	–	
47	FC Frunze zavod Kostiantynivka	2	1936 (f)	1937	16	7	1	8	26	30	22	–	–	–	
48	FC Traktornyi zavod Kharkiv	2	1936 (s)	1936 (f)	9	6	2	1	18	9	20	–	–	–	
49	FC Lenin zavod Dnipropetrovsk	2	1936 (s)	1936 (f)	9	4	1	4	16	15	13	–	–	–	
50	FC Stal Dnipropetrovsk	1	1937		11	3	4	4	20	27	13	–	–	–	
51	SC Prometei Dniprodzerzhynsk	1	1970		26	2	4	20	8	14	10	–	–	–	
52	FC Lokomotyv Kyiv	1	1936 (f)		5	1	3	1	7	6	6	–	–	–	

In 1937, three more clubs from Ukraine competed in the 5th tier: Lokomotyv Dnipropetrovsk, Sudnobudivnyk Mykolaiv, and Spartak Kyiv.

=== All Ukrainian teams that participated in the Soviet league competitions by regions ===
Region	Teams
Donetsk (13)	Shakhtar Donetsk (1936–1991 {44 (I) + 7 (II) + 3 (III) = 54}), Sital (imeni Frunze) Kostiantynivka (1936–1969 {3 (III) + 2 (IV) = 5}), Avanhard Kramatorsk (1948–1970 {5 (II) + 6 (III) + 1 (IV) = 12}), Lokomotyv Donetsk (1958–1972 {5 (II) + 9 (III) + 1 (IV) = 15}), Shakhtar Horlivka (1959–1987 {4 (II) + 23 (III) = 27}), Novator Zhdanov/Mariupol (1960–1988 {5 (II) + 22 (III) = 27}), Industriya Yenakieve (1963–1969 {4 III}), Shakhtar Torez (1965–1970 {5 (III) + 1 (IV) = 6}), Shakhtar Yenakieve (1965–1967 {3 III}), Kirovets Makiivka (1966–1972 {5 (III) + 1 (IV) = 6}), Start Dzerzhynsk (1966–1968 {3 III}), Stakhanovets Krasnoarmiysk (1968–1969 {2 III}), Dzerzhynets Dzerzhynsk (1969 {1 III})
Dnipropetrovsk (12)	Dynamo Dnipropetrovsk (1936–1937 {1 (II) + 2 (III) = 3}), Stal (imeni Lenina) Dnipropetrovsk (1936 {2 IV}), Dnipro [ZiP] (1937–1991 {19 (I) + 26 (II) + 1 (IV) = 46}), Lokomotyv Dnipropetrovsk (1937–1969 {2 (III) + 1 (V) = 3}), Prometei Dniprodzerzhynsk (1957–1970 {6 (II) + 7 (III) + 1 (IV) = 14}), Kryvbas Kryvyi Rih (1959–1991 {8 (II) + 22 (III) + 2 (IV) = 32}), Avanhard Zhovti Vody (1960–1970 {5 (II) + 5 (III) + 1 (IV) = 11}), Kolos Nikopol (1962–1991 {9 (II) + 4 (III) + 2 (IV) = 15}), Trubnyk Nikopol (1963–1970 {6 (III) + 1 (IV) = 7}), Stal Dnipropetrovsk (1967 {1 III}), Metalurh Dniprodzerzhynsk (1979–1985 {7 III}), Kolos Pavlohrad (1981–1988 {8 III})
Luhansk (11)	Zorya Voroshilovgrad/Luhansk (1939–1990 {14 (I) + 18 (II) + 4 (III) = 36}), Dynamo Voroshilovgrad/Luhansk (1947–1949 {3 II}), Shakhtar Stakhanov/Kadiivka (1948–1991 {8 (II) + 17 (III) + 1 (IV) = 26}), Khimik Severodonetsk (1960–1991 {5 (II) + 7 (III) + 2 (IV) = 14}), Komunarets Komunarsk/Alchevsk (1963–1970 {6 (III) + 1 (IV) = 7}), Shakhtar Krasnyi Luch (1965–1970 {5 (III) + 1 (IV) = 6}), Shakhtar Sverdlovsk (1968–1969 {2 III}), Avanhard Rovenky (1968–1970 {2 (III) + 1 (IV) = 3}), Avanhard Antratsyt (1969–1970 {1 (III) + 1 (IV) = 2}), Shakhtar Kirovsk (1970 {1 IV}), Stal Alchevsk (1991 {1 IV})
Kyiv (7)	Dynamo (1936–1991 {54 I}), Lokomotyv (1936–1940 {1 (I) + 2 (II) + 2 (III) + 1 (IV) = 6}), Spartak (1937–1949 {1 (II) + 1 (V) = 2}), SKA (1947–1991 {19 (II) + 17 (III) + 2 (IV) = 38}), Arsenal (1959–1963 {4 (II) + 1 (III) = 5}), Temp (1964 {1 III}), Dynamo-2 (1965 {1 III})
Kharkiv (7)	Spartak Kharkiv (1936–1941 {2 (I) + 1 (II) + 3 (III) = 6}), Silmash Kharkiv (1936–1940 {1 (I) + 3 (II) + 1 (III) = 5}), Torpedo Kharkiv (1936–1968 {4 (II) + 6 (III) + 2 (IV) = 12}), Dynamo Kharkiv (1936–1940 {3 (II) + 2 (III) = 5}), Lokomotyv Kharkiv (1945–1955 {4 (I) + 7 (II) = 11}), Metalist [Dzerzhinets, Avanhard] Kharkiv (1947–1991 {14 (I) + 21 (II) + 5 (III) = 40}), Mayak Kharkiv (1972–1991 {8 (III) + 2 (IV) = 10})
Odesa (6)	Dynamo Odesa (1936–1939 {2 (I) + 3 (III) = 5}), Chornomorets [Kharchovyk] Odesa (1940–1991 {25 (I) + 21 (II) + 2 (III) = 48}), Metalurh Odesa (1953–1954 {2 III}), SKA Odesa (1958–1990 {2 (I) + 14 (II) + 17 (III) = 33}), Dunayets Izmail (1964–1968 {5 III}), Avtomobilist Odesa (1965–1966 {2 III})
Lviv (6)	Spartak Lviv (1947–1949 {3 II}), SKA[-Karpaty] Lviv (1949–1990 {23 (II) + 11 (III) = 34}), Naftovyk Drohobych (1960–1970 {3 (II) + 6 (III) + 1 (IV) = 10}), Karpaty Lviv (1963–1991 {9 (I) + 12 (II) + 3 (III) = 24}), Shakhtar Chervonohrad (1968–1970 {2 (III) + 1 (IV) = 3}), Karpaty Kamianka-Buzka (1991 {1 IV})
Zaporizhia (5)	Metalurh Zaporizhia (1947–1991 {1 (I) + 40 (II) + 1 (III) = 42}), Spartak Melitopol (1963–1966 {4 III}), Torpedo Berdyansk (1966–1970 {4 (III) + 1 (IV) = 5}), Kolos Yakymivka (1968–1969 {2 III}), Torpedo Zaporizhia (1985–1990 {5 (III) + 1 (IV) = 6})
Mykolaiv (3)	[Sudnobudivnyk, Avanhard] Mykolaiv (1937–1990 {15 (II) + 23 (III) + 1 (IV) + 1 (V) = 40}), Budivelnyk Pervomaisk (1969 {1 III}), Mayak Ochakiv (1991 {1 IV})
Khmelnytskyi (3)	Podillia [Dynamo] Khmelnytskyi (1960–1991 {4 (II) + 24 (III) + 3 (IV) = 31}), Podillia Kamianets-Podilskyi (1968–1970 {2 (III) + 1 (IV) = 3}), Temp Shepetivka (1991 {1 IV})
Sumy (3)	Frunzenets [Avanhard, Spartak] Sumy (1960–1982 {3 (II) + 20 (III) = 23}), Naftovyk Okhtyrka (1986–1991 {4 (III) + 2 (IV) = 6}), Avtomobilist Sumy (1991 {1 IV})
Crimea (2)	Tavriya [Avanhard] Simferopol (1958–1991 {1 (I) + 23 (II) + 10 (III) = 34}), Okean Kerch (1963–1991 {17 (III) + 2 (IV) = 19})
Zakarpattia (2)	Verkhovyna [Spartak] Uzhhorod (1947–1991 {13 (II) + 26 (III) + 2 (IV) = 41}), Pryladyst (Bilshovyk) Mukachevo (1948–1991 {2 (II) + 2 (III) + 2 (IV) = 6})
Kirovohrad (2)	Zirka [Torpedo] Kirovohrad (1958–1991 {8 (II) + 22 (III) + 2 (IV) = 32}), Shakhtar Oleksandriya (1962–1970 {1 (II) + 6 (III) + 1 (IV) = 8})
Kherson (2)	Lokomotyv [Mayak, Budivelnyk] Kherson (1947–1991 {9 (II) + 24 (III) + 2 (IV) = 35}), Enerhiya Nova Kakhovka (1967–1970 {3 (III) + 1 (IV) = 4})
Sevastopol (2)	SKF [DOF, SKCF] Sevastopol (1954–1970 {9 (II) + 5 (III) + 1 (IV) = 15}), Chaika Sevastopol (1963–1991 {22 (III) + 2 (IV) = 24})
Poltava (2)	Vorskla [Kolhospnyk, Kolos, Silbud, Budivelnyk] Poltava (1957–1990 {7 (II) + 22 (III) = 29}), Dnipro Kremenchuk (1963–1990 {1 (II) + 8 (III) = 9})
Zhytomyr (2)	Polissia [Avanhard, Avtomobilist] Zhytomyr (1959–1991 {5 (II) + 24 (III) + 2 (IV) = 31}), Prohres Berdychiv (1968–1969 {2 III})
Chernivtsi (2)	Dynamo Chernivtsi (1949 {1 II}), Bukovyna [Avanhard] Chernivtsi (1960–1991 {5 (II) + 26 (III) = 31})
Ternopil (2)	Avanhard Ternopil (1959–1973 {5 (II) + 10 (III) = 15}), Nyva Ternopil (1983–1990 {8 III})
Volyn (2)	Volyn [Torpedo] Lutsk (1960–1990 {3 (II) + 27 (III) + 1 (IV) = 31}), Shakhtar Novovolynsk (1968 {1 III})
Ivano-Frankivsk (1)	Prykarpattia [Spartak] Ivano-Frankivsk (1956–1991 {16 (II) + 17 (III) + 2 (IV) = 35})
Rivne (1)	Veres [Kolhospnyk, Horyn] Rivne (1958–1991 {5 (II) + 25 (III) + 3 (IV) = 33})
Vinnytsia (1)	Nyva [Lokomotyv] Vinnytsia (1958–1990 {9 (II) + 22 (III) + 1 (IV) = 32})
Cherkasy (1)	Dnipro [Kolhospnyk] Cherkasy (1958–1991 {5 (II) + 18 (III) + 3 (IV) = 26})
Chernihiv (1)	Desna Chernihiv (1960–1991 {4 (II) + 19 (III) + 2 (IV) = 25})
Kyiv (1)	Dynamo Bila Tserkva (1984–1991 {5 (III) + 2 (IV) = 7})

=== Seasons in the Soviet league competitions ===
There were 101 teams from Ukraine that have taken part in 54 Soviet League seasons from the 1936 season until the 1991 season.

- 54 seasons: Dynamo Kyiv, Shakhtar Donetsk [Stalino]
- 48 seasons: Chornomorets Odesa
- 46 seasons: Dnipro Dnipropetrovsk
- 42 seasons: Metalurh Zaporizhia
- 41 seasons: Verkhovyna Uzhhorod
- 40 seasons: Metalist Kharkiv, Sudnobudivnyk Mykolaiv
- 38 seasons: SKA Kyiv
- 36 seasons: Zorya Luhansk [Voroshilovgrad]
- 35 seasons: Lokomotyv Kherson, Prykarpattia Ivano-Frankivsk
- 34 seasons: SKA Lviv, Tavriya Simferopol
- 33 seasons: SKA Odesa, Veres Rivne
- 32 seasons: Kryvbas Kryvyi Rih, Nyva Vinnytsia, Zirka Kirovohrad
- 31 seasons: Bukovyna Chernivtsi, Podillya Khmelnytskyi, Polissya Zhytomyr, Volyn Lutsk
- 29 seasons: Vorskla Poltava
- 27 seasons: Novator Mariupol [Zhdanov], Shakhtar Horlivka
- 26 seasons: Dnipro Cherkasy, Shakhtar Kadiivka [Stakhanov]
- 25 seasons: Desna Chernihiv
- 24 seasons: Chaika Sevastopol, Karpaty Lviv
- 23 seasons: Frunzenets Sumy
- 19 seasons: Okean Kerch
- 15 seasons: Avanhard Ternopil, Kolos Nikopol, Lokomotyv Donetsk, SKF Sevastopol
- 14 seasons: Khimik Severodonetsk, Prometei Dniprodzerzhynsk
- 12 seasons: Avanhard Kramatorsk, Torpedo Kharkiv
- 11 seasons: Avanhard Zhovti Vody, Lokomotyv Kharkiv
- 10 seasons: Mayak Kharkiv, Naftovyk Drohobych
- 9 seasons: Dnipro Kremenchuk
- 8 seasons: Kolos Pavlohrad, Nyva Ternopil, Shakhtar Oleksandriya
- 7 seasons: Dynamo Bila Tserkva, Komunarets Alchevsk [Komunarsk], Metalurh Dniprodzerzhynsk, Trubnyk Nikopol
- 6 seasons: Kirovets Makiivka, Lokomotyv Kyiv, Naftovyk Okhtyrka, Pryladyst Mukachevo, Shakhtar Krasnyi Luch, Shakhtar Torez, Spartak Kharkiv, Torpedo Zaporizhia
- 5 seasons: Arsenal Kyiv, Dunayets Izmail, Dynamo Kharkiv, Dynamo Odesa, Silmash Kharkiv, Sitall Kostiantynivka, Torpedo Berdyansk
- 4 seasons: Enerhiya Nova Kakhovka, Industriya Yenakieve, Spartak Melitopol
- 3 seasons: Avanhard Rovenky, Dynamo Dnipropetrovsk, Dynamo Voroshilovgrad, Lokomotyv Dnipropetrovsk, Podillya Kamianets-Podilskyi, Shakhtar Chervonohrad, Shakhtar Yenakieve, Spartak Lviv, Start Dzerzhynsk
- 2 seasons: Avanhard Antratsyt, Avtomobilist Odesa, Kolos Yakymivka, Metalurh Odesa, Prohres Berdychiv, Shakhtar Sverdlovsk, Spartak Kyiv, Stakhanovets Krasnoarmiysk, Stal Dnipropetrovsk
- 1 seasons: Avtomobilist Sumy, Budivelnyk Pervomaisk, Dzerzhynets Dzerzhynsk, Dynamo Chernivtsi, Dynamo-2 Kyiv, Karpaty Kamianka-Buzka, Mayak Ochakiv, Shakhtar Kirovsk, Shakhtar Novovolynsk, Stal Alchevsk, Stal Dnipropetrovsk, Temp Kyiv, Temp Shepetivka

== All-time table of Ukrainian clubs in the Soviet Cup competitions ==
wildstat.ru

Rank	Team	Seasons	First year	Last year	P	W	D	L	GF	GA	Pts	1st	2nd	3rd	Other names used
1	Shakhtar Donetsk		1936	1991	180	106	23	51	318	184	341				
2	Dynamo Kyiv		1936	1991	167	106	18	43	306	165	336				
3	Chornomorets Odesa		1936	1991	142	66	23	53	206	168	221				
4	Dnipro		1936	1991	135	58	22	55	212	183	196				
5	Metalurh Zaporizhia		1938	1991	117	51	16	50	183	151	169				
6	Tavriya Simferopol		1938	1991	92	45	13	34	138	126	148				
7	Metalist Kharkiv		1936	1991	97	41	17	39	108	107	140				
8	Karpaty Lviv		1963	1991	75	39	12	24	89	66	129				
9	Zorya Luhansk		1937	1991	96	34	18	44	115	145	120				
10	SKA Kiev		1947	1987	72	34	5	33	95	102	107				
11	SKA Lvov		1949	1989	61	29	5	27	99	86	92				
12	SKA Odessa		1958	1991	63	29	5	29	71	77	92				
13	Spartak Ivano-Frankivsk		1957	1988	64	24	14	26	66	78	86				
14	Polissia Zhytomyr		1938	1991	40	21	8	11	54	30	71				
15	Kolos Nikopol		1962	1989	56	21	8	27	57	63	71				
16	MFC Mykolaiv		1936	1986	45	22	1	22	66	61	67				
17	Krystal Kherson		1938	1970	40	21	4	15	43	45	67				
18	Nyva Vinnytsia		1938	1991	41	21	3	17	72	62	66				
19	SKCF Sevastopol		1954	1968	31	17	2	12	53	47	53				
20	Budivelnyk Ternopil		1959	1970	30	15	4	11	42	37	49				
21	Desna Chernihiv		1938	1970	30	14	4	12	34	33	46				
22	Hoverla Uzhhorod		1946	1986	34	14	2	18	57	72	44				
23	Lokomotyv Kharkiv		1936	1955	30	12	3	15	46	48	39				
24	Khimik Severodonetsk		1961	1969	21	12	1	8	26	19	37				
25	Kryvbas Kryvyi Rih		1936	1989	34	11	4	19	43	56	37				
26	Kremin Kremenchuk		1938	1990	19	12	0	7	27	17	36				
27	Dnipro Cherkasy		1958	1968	23	11	3	9	24	27	36				
28	Avanhard Kramatorsk		1937	1966	23	11	2	10	31	33	35				
29	Shakhtar Stakhanov		1936	1970	26	11	1	14	34	43	34				
30	Zirka Kropyvnytskyi		1953	1970	24	11	0	13	30	32	33				
31	Avanhard Zhovti Vody		1961	1968	20	10	2	8	25	19	32				
32	Podillia Khmelnytskyi		1961	1989	21	10	1	10	34	35	31				
33	Frunzenets Sumy		1961	1970	19	9	2	8	23	25	29				
34	Torpedo Kharkiv		1936	1968	22	9	2	11	20	23	29				
35	Bukovyna Chernivtsi		1949	1991	24	8	2	14	31	39	26				
36	Silmash Kharkiv		1936	1939	14	7	3	4	29	18	24				
37	Nyva Ternopil		1986	1991	13	8	0	5	16	19	24				
38	Vorskla Poltava		1938	1991	26	7	3	16	31	33	24				
39	Sitall Kostiantynivka		1936	1968	13	7	2	4	33	15	23				
40	Chaika Sevastopol		1936	1989	15	7	0	8	18	18	21				
41	Spartak Kharkiv		1936	1939	11	6	1	4	23	24	19				
42	Zenit Kharkiv		1936	1938	8	6	0	2	13	7	18				
43	Mariupol		1936	1970	16	5	3	8	12	19	18				
44	Dynamo Kharkiv		1936	1939	10	5	1	4	24	9	16				
45	Dynamo Luhansk		1947	1949	8	5	1	2	15	12	16				
46	Dunayets Izmail		1964	1966	9	5	1	3	13	13	16				
47	Zavod imeni Stalina Kramatorsk		1937	1938	8	5	1	2	15	19	16				
48	Spartak Dnipropetrovsk		1937	1938	7	5	0	2	20	9	15				
49	Shakhtar Oleksandriya		1962	1966	10	5	0	5	14	14	15				
50	Veres Rivne		1958	1968	14	5	0	9	18	27	15				
51	Dynamo Mykolaiv		1938		5	4	0	1	17	2	12				
52	Dynamo-2 Kyiv		1938	1965	6	4	0	2	17	6	12				
53	Zdorovia Kharkiv		1937	1938	6	4	0	2	9	9	12				
54	Lokomotyv Kyiv		1936	1939	8	4	0	4	11	17	12				
55	Lokomotyv Donetsk		1958	1968	13	4	0	9	13	20	12				
56	Zenit Stalino		1938		5	3	1	1	19	0	10				
57	Pryladyst Mukacheve		1949	1968	6	3	1	2	9	7	10				
58	Stal Alchevsk		1938	1966	9	3	1	5	12	15	10				
59	Temp Kyiv		1936	1964	10	3	1	6	9	16	10				
60	Prometei Dniprodzerzhinsk		1957	1968	14	3	1	10	11	27	10				
61	Lokomotyv-2 Kyiv		1938		4	3	0	1	10	9	9				
62	Stalinets Kharkiv		1937	1938	5	3	0	2	14	11	9				
63	Spartak Kyiv		1936	1949	7	3	0	4	13	16	9				
64	Volyn Lutsk		1961	1990	12	2	2	8	6	15	8				
65	Metalurh Dniprodzerzhinsk		1936	1938	5	2	1	2	13	6	7				
66	Vodnyk Kyiv		1938		4	2	1	1	6	4	7				
67	Enerhia Nova Kakhovka		1968		3	2	1	0	2	0	7				
68	Dynamo Dnipropetrovsk		1936	1938	5	2	0	3	11	1	6				
69	Zenit Kyiv		1938		3	2	0	1	10	6	6				
70	Lokomotyv Dnipropetrovsk		1936	1938	5	2	0	3	14	11	6				
71	Lokomotyv Odesa		1938		3	2	0	1	8	5	6				
72	Tsvetmet Zaporizhia		1938		3	2	0	1	9	8	6				
73	Stakhanovets Lysychansk		1938		3	2	0	1	5	4	6				
74	Kolos Yakymivka		1968		3	2	0	1	5	4	6				
75	Shakhta 30 Rutchenkove		1938		3	2	0	1	5	5	6				
76	Burevisnyk Stalino		1938		3	2	0	1	5	9	6				
77	Spartak Melitopol		1963	1966	6	2	0	4	6	11	6				
78	Naftovyk Okhtyrka		1988	1991	5	2	0	3	5	11	6				
79	Okean Kerch		1938	1989	10	2	0	8	8	21	6				
80	Shakhtar Horlivka		1938	1970	11	2	0	9	10	24	6				
81	Kirovets Makiivka		1938	1968	6	1	2	3	3	6	5				
82	Burevisnyk Kryvyi Rih		1938		3	1	1	1	5	7	4				
83	Mashynobudivnyk Kyiv		1954	1955	4	1	1	2	3	8	4				
84	Krylya Sovetov Zaporizhia		1936	1938	5	1	1	3	4	12	4				
85	Molnia Kharkiv		1938		2	1	0	1	5	1	3				
86	Zavod imeni Libknekhta Dnipropetrovsk		1938		2	1	0	1	5	2	3				
87	Dynamo Kryvyi Rih		1936		2	1	0	1	7	5	3				
89	Stakhanovets Horlivka		1938		2	1	0	1	5	4	3				
88	Kolos Pavlohrad		1985		2	1	0	1	5	4	3				
90	Avanhard Kharkiv		1938		2	1	0	1	4	4	3				
91	Kharkiv		1949		2	1	0	1	4	4	3				
92	Tsukrovyk Sumy		1938		2	1	0	1	1	1	3				
93	Silmash Zaporizhia		1938		2	1	0	1	4	5	3				
94	Avtomotor Kharkiv		1938		2	1	0	1	3	4	3				
95	Zavod imeni Lenina Krasnohorivka		1938		2	1	0	1	3	4	3				
96	Lokomotyv Lozova		1938		2	1	0	1	7	9	3				
97	Drohobych		1990		2	1	0	1	3	5	3				
98	Spartak Sumy		1938		2	1	0	1	2	5	3				
99	Bilshovyk Kyiv		1936		2	1	0	1	2	6	3				
100	Lokomotyv Konotop		1938		2	1	0	1	1	5	3				
101	Stal Kryvyi Rih		1938		2	1	0	1	3	8	3				
102	Stakhanovets Artemivsk		1938		2	1	0	1	3	10	3				
103	Burevisnyk Krasnyi Luch		1938		2	1	0	1	0	12	3				
104	Start Dzerzhynsk		1966/67	1967/68	3	1	0	2	3	3	3				
105	Avtomobilist Odesa		1965	1966/67	3	1	0	2	5	6	3				
106	Spartak Lviv		1947	1949	3	1	0	2	4	5	3				
107	Shakhtar Torez		1965	1966/67	3	1	0	2	5	8	3				
108	FShM Kyiv		1938	1955	3	1	0	2	3	9	3				
109	Shakhtar Krasnyi Luch		1938	1966/67	4	1	0	3	5	9	3				
110	Industriya Yenakievo		1938	1964	4	1	0	3	4	8	3				
111	Naftovyk Drohobych		1961	1967/68	8	1	0	7	11	18	3				
112	Avanhard Rovenky		1967/68		1	0	1	0	0	0	1				
113	Lokomovtyv Kotovsk		1938		2	0	1	1	3	3	1				
114	Dynamo Vinnytsia		1938		2	0	1	1	2	3	1				
115	Dynamo Mohyliv-Podilskyi		1938		2	0	1	1	1	2	1				
116	DKA Korosten		1938		1	0	0	1	0	0	0				
117	Lokomotyv Poltava		1938		1	0	0	1	0	0	0				
118	Spartak Korosten		1938		1	0	0	1	0	0	0				
119	Avanhard Druzhkivka		1938		1	0	0	1	2	3	0				
120	Avanhard Stalino		1938		1	0	0	1	2	3	0				

=== Participated Ukrainian teams in the Soviet Cup by regions ===
Region	Teams
Donetsk (26)	Shakhtar Donetsk (1936–1939, 1944, 1945, 1947, 1949–1955, 1957–1991/92 {49}), Sital [Stal] Kostiantynivka (1936–1938, 1967/68 {4}), Stal [Kirovsky Zavod] Makiivka (1936, 1938 {2}), Zavod im.Lenina Mariupol (1936 {1}), Avanhard [ZiO] Kramatorsk (1937–1939, 1961–1965, 1966/67 {9}), Zavod im.Stalina Kramatorsk (1937, 1938 {2}), Lokomotyv Yasynuvata (1937, 1938 {2}), Zenit Stalino (1938 {1}), Burevisnyk Stalino (1938 {1}), Shakhta-30 Rutchenkove (1938 {1}), Zavod im.Lenina Krasnohorivka (1938 {1}), Stakhanovets Artemivsk (1938 {1}), Azot Horlivka (1938 {1}), Avanhard Stalino (1938 {1}), Lokomotyv Slovyansk (1938 {1}), Avanhard Druzhkivka (1938 {1}), Avanhard Horlivka (1938 {1}), Stal Stalino (1938 {1}), Stakhanovets Krasnoarmiysk (1938 {1}), Lokomotyv Donetsk (1958–1965, 1966/67, 1967/68 {9}), Shakhtar Horlivka (1959/60–1965, 1966/67, 1970 {8}), Azovets [Azovstal] Mariupol (1961–1964, 1966/67, 1969, 1970 {7}), Industriya [Metalurh] Yenakieve (1963, 1964 {2}), Shakhtar Torez (1965, 1966/67 {2}), Shakhtar Yenakieve (1965, 1966/67 {2}), Avanhard Makiivka (1966/67, 1967/68 {2}), Start Dzerzhynsk (1966/67, 1967/68 {2})
Dnipropetrovsk (24)	Dnipro [ZiP] (1936–1939, 1947, 1949, 1953–1955, 1957–1991/92 {44}), Dynamo Dnipropetrovsk (1936–1938 {3}), Lokomotyv Dnipropetrovsk (1936–1938 {3}), Stal [ZiL] Dnipropetrovsk (1936, 1937 {2}), Stal Kamianske (1936, 1938 {2}), Dynamo Kryvyi Rih (1936 {1}), Hirnyk Kryvyi Rih (1936 {1}), Spartak Dnipropetrovsk (1937, 1938 {2}), Budivelnyk Kryvyi Rih (1937, 1938 {2}), Burevisnyk Kryvyi Rih (1938 {1}), Stal Kryvyi Rih (1938 {1}), Ruda Kryvyi Rih (1938 {1}), Zavod im.Libknekhta Dnipropetrovsk (1938 {1}), SKIF Dnirpopetrovsk (1938 {1}), Lokomotyv Synelnykove (1938 {1}), Budivelnyk Dniprodzerzhynsk (1938 {1}), Zavod im.Kominterna Dnipropetrovsk (1938 {1}), Stakhanovets Ordzhonikidze (1938 {1}), Prometei [Khimik, Dniprovets] Dniprodzerzhinsk (1957–1965, 1966/67, 1967/68 {10}), Kryvbas [Avanhard, Hirnyk] Kryvyi Rih (1959/60–1965, 1966/67–1970, 1972, 1976, 1977, 1987/88, 1989/90 {15}), Avanhard Zhovti Vody (1961–1965, 1966/67, 1967/68 {7}), Trubnyk Nikopol (1962–1965, 1966/67, 1967/68 {6}), Kolos Nikopol (1978–1989/90 {13}), Kolos Pavlohrad (1985/86 {1})
Kyiv (15)	Dynamo (1936–1939, 1944–1955, 1957–1991/92 {51}), Arsenal [Mashynobudivnyk] (1936, 1954, 1955, 1959/60–1963 {7}), Lokomotyv (1936–1939 {4}), Spartak (1936–1938, 1949 {4}), Bilshovyk (1936 {1}), Vympel (1936 {1}), Dynamo-2 (1938, 1965 {2}), Lokomotyv-2 (1938 {1}), Zenit (1938 {1}), Vodnyk (1938 {1}), SKIF (1938 {1}), Rot Front (1938 {1}), CSKA [SKA] (1947, 1949, 1952, 1954, 1955, 1957, 1958, 1961–1970, 1977, 1978, 1981, 1982, 1984, 1986/87, 1987/88 {24}), FShM (1955 {1}), Temp (1964 {1})
Kharkiv (15)	Metalist [Dzerzhinets, Avanhard] Kharkiv (1936, 1938, 1947, 1949, 1957–1973, 1975, 1977, 1979–1991/92 {36}), Lokomotyv Kharkiv (1936–1939, 1944, 1945, 1947–1955 {15}), Torpedo [Traktorny Zavod] Kharkiv (1936–1938, 1949, 1961–1965, 1966/67, 1967/68 {11}), Dynamo Kharkiv (1936–1939 {4}), Spartak Kharkiv (1936–1939 {4}), Silmash Kharkiv (1936–1939 {4}), Stalinets Kharkiv (1936–1938 {3}), Zdorovia Kharkiv (1937, 1938 {2}), Zenit Kharkiv (1938, 1949 {2}), Lokomotyv Lozova (1938 {1}), Avtomotor Kharkiv (1938 {1}), Avanhard Kharkiv (1938 {1}), Molnia Kharkiv (1938 {1}), Kanatnyi Zavod Kharkiv (1938 {1}), Silmash-2 Kharkiv (1938 {1})
Luhansk (12)	Shakhtar Kadiivka (1936, 1938, 1949, 1957–1965, 1966/67–1970 {15}), Zorya Luhansk (1937–1939, 1964–1985/86, 1987/88–1991/92 {31}), Komunarets [Stal, Metalurh] Alchevsk (1938, 1963–1965, 1966/67 {5}), Shakhtar [Stakhanovets] Krasnyi Luch (1938, 1965, 1966/67 {3}), Stakhanovets Lysychansk (1938 {1}), Burevisnyk Kransyi Luch (1938 {1}), Spartak Starobilsk (1938 {1}), Dynamo Luhansk (1947, 1949 {2}), Trudovi Rezervy Luhansk (1949, 1957–1963 {7}), Khimik Severodonetsk (1961–1965, 1966/67–1969 {8}), Avanhard Rovenky (1967/68 {1}), Shakhtar Sverdlovsk (1967/68 {1})
Zaporizhia (9)	Krylya Sovetov Zaporizhia (1936–1938 {3}), Lokomotyv Zaporizhia (1938, 1949 {2}), Tsvetmet Zaporizhia (1938 {1}), Silmash Zaporizhia (1938 {1}), Krylya Sovetov Berdyansk (1938 {1}), Bilshovyk Zaporizhia (1947 {1}), Metalurh Zaporizhia (1950–1955, 1957–1991/92 {41}), Spartak [Burevisnyk] Melitopol (1963–1965, 1966/67 {4}), Torpedo Berdyansk (1966/67, 1967/68 {2}), Kolos Yakymivka (1967/68 {1})
Odesa (8)	Dynamo Odesa (1936–1939 {4}), KinAp Odesa (1936 {1}), Chornomorets [Kharchovyk] Odesa (1938, 1945, 1947, 1949, 1950, 1955, 1957–1991/92 {41}), Lokomotyv Odesa (1938 {1}), Lokomotyv Kotovsk (1938 {1}), Metalurh Odesa (1953, 1954 {2}), SKA Odesa (1958–1970, 1978–1982, 1986/87, 1988/89–1991/92 {22}), Dunayets Izmail (1964, 1965, 1966/67 {3}), Avtomobilist Odesa (1965, 1966/67 {2})
Poltava (8)	Dzerzhynets Kremenchuk (1938 {1}), Rot Front Poltava (1938 {1}), Dynamo Poltava (1938 {1}), Spartak Poltava (1938 {1}), Tsukrovyk Karlivka (1938 {1}), Lokomotyv Poltava (1938 {1}), Vorskla [Kolhospnyk, Kolos, Silbud, Budivelnyk] Poltava (1957–1965, 1966/67–1970, 1989/90–1991/92 {15}), Kremin [Dnipro] Kremenchuk (1963–1965, 1966/67, 1967/68, 1990/91 {6})
Sumy (7)	Tsukrovyk Sumy (1938 {1}), Spartak Sumy (1938 {1}), Avanhard Sumy (1938 {1}), Lokomotyv Konotop (1938 {1}), Azot Shostka (1938 {1}), Frunzenets [Avanhard, Spartak] Sumy (1961–1965, 1966/67, 1967/68, 1970 {8}), Naftovyk Okhtyrka (1988/89, 1991/92 {2})
Kherson (6)	Kharchovyk Kherson (1938 {1}), Znannia Kherson (1938 {1}), Vodnyk Kherson (1938 {1}), Spartak Kherson (1947, 1949, 1958, 1959/60 {4}), Lokomotyv [Mayak, Budivelnyk] Kherson (1961–1970 {10}), Enerhiya Nova Kakhovka (1967/68 {1})
Zhytomyr (6)	Keramik Baranivka (1936 {1}), Dynamo Zhytomyr (1938 {1}), DKA Korosten (1938 {1}), Spartak Korosten (1938 {1}), Polissia [Avanhard, Avtomobilist] Zhytomyr (1959/60–1965, 1966/67–1970, 1991/92 {11}), Prohres Berdychiv (1967/68 {1})
Lviv (5)	Spartak Lviv (1947, 1949 {2}), SKA[-Karpaty] Lviv (1949, 1954, 1955, 1957–1970, 1982–1989/90 {25}), [Naftovyk] Drohobych (1961–1965, 1966/67, 1967/68, 1990/91 {8}), Karpaty Lviv (1963–1981, 1990/91, 1991/92 {21}), Shakhtar Chervonohrad (1967/68 {1})
Vinnytsia (4)	Dynamo Mohyliv-Podilskyi (1938 {1}), Dynamo Vinnytsia (1938 {1}), Temp Vinnytsia (1938 {1}), Nyva [Lokomotyv] Vinnytsia (1958–1969, 1984/85–1987/88, 1990/91, 1991/92 {17})
Kirovohrad (4)	Silmash Kirovohrad (1938 {1}), Zirka [Torpedo] Kirovohrad (1953, 1958–1961, 1963–1970 {12}), Shakhtar Oleksandriya (1962–1965, 1966/67 {5}), Dynamo Kirovohrad (1962 {1})
Mykolaiv (3)	[Sudnobudivnyk, Avanhard] Mykolaiv (1936–1939, 1947, 1949, 1957–1970, 1984/85–1986/87 {22}), Lokomotyv Voznesensk (1938 {1}), Dynamo Mykolaiv (1938 {1})
Crimea (2)	Tavriya [Avanhard] Simferopol (1958–1970, 1974–1991/92 {31}), Okean [Metalurh, Avanhard] Kerch (1963–1965, 1966/67, 1967/68, 1988/89, 1989/90 {7})
Zakarpattia (2)	Verkhovyna [Spartak] Uzhhorod (1946, 1947, 1949–1951, 1954, 1955, 1957–1965, 1966/67, 1967/68, 1986/87 {18}), Karpaty [Bilshovyk] Mukacheve (1949, 1967/68 {2})
Sevastopol (2)	SKF [DOF, SKCF] Sevastopol (1954, 1955, 1957–1965, 1966/67, 1967/68 {12}), Chaika Sevastopol [Balaklava] (1964, 1965, 1966/67, 1989/90 {4})
Ternopil (2)	Avanhard Ternopil (1959/60–1970 {11}), Nyva Ternopil (1986/87–1988/89, 1990/91, 1991/92 {5})
Chernivtsi (2)	Dynamo Chernivtsi (1949 {1}), Bukovyna [Avanhard] Chernivtsi (1961–1965, 1966/67–1970, 1988/89–1991/92 {13})
Chernihiv (2)	Spartak Chernihiv (1938 {1}), Desna Chernihiv (1961–1970 {10})
Cherkasy (2)	Kolhosp imeni Chapayeva (1936 {1}), Dnipro [Kolhospnyk] Cherkasy (1958–1965, 1966/67, 1967/68 {9})
Volyn (2)	Volyn [Torpedo] Lutsk (1961–1965, 1966/67, 1967/68, 1987/88, 1990/91 {9}), Shakhtar Novovolynsk (1967/68 {1})
Ivano-Frankivsk (1)	Prykarpattia [Spartak] Ivano-Frankivsk (1957–1965, 1966/67, 1967/68, 1970, 1973–1981, 1988/89 {21})
Khmelnytskyi (1)	Podillia [Dynamo] Khmelnytskyi (1961–1965, 1966/67–1969, 1988/89, 1989/90 {10})
Rivne (1)	Veres [Kolhospnyk, Horyn] Rivne (1958–1965, 1966/67, 1967/68 {9})
Moldavian Autonomy (1)	Spartak Tiraspol (1938 {1})

== Awards ==

Symbolic team of 2010
by the readers of ua-football.com.
Head coach: Mircea Lucescu.

Other 2010 awards (ua-football.com readers)

Second symbolic team: Maksym Koval – Vitaliy Denisov, Milan Obradovic, Papa Gueye, Artem Fedetsky – Willian, Fernandinho, Oleksandr Aliyev, Denys Oliynyk – Taison, Artem Milevskyi – Coach: Myron Markevych

- Discovery of the season – Karpaty Lviv
- Best rookie – Yaroslav Rakytsky
- Best legionnaire – Darijo Srna
- Best Ukrainian player – Ihor Khudobyak
- Team of the season – Ukraine U-21

== Attendances ==
The average attendance per top-flight football league season and the club with the highest average attendance:

Season	League average	Best club	Best club average
2019–20	4,197	Dynamo Kyiv	12,861
2018–19	4,160	Dynamo Kyiv	14,239
2017–18	3,860	Dynamo Kyiv	8,541
2016–17	4,262	Dynamo Kyiv	12,035
2015–16	5,008	Dynamo Kyiv	13,019
2014–15	6,143	Dynamo Kyiv	19,254
2013–14	10,930	Shakhtar Donetsk	33,226
2012–13	12,547	Shakhtar Donetsk	40,522
2011–12	11,309	Shakhtar Donetsk	36,983
2010–11	9,225	Shakhtar Donetsk	33,897
2009–10	8,943	Shakhtar Donetsk	27,321
2008–09	7,574	Shakhtar Donetsk	15,387
2007–08	8,295	Shakhtar Donetsk	19,747
2006–07	9,052	Shakhtar Donetsk	19,193
2005–06	7,838	Shakhtar Donetsk	18,667
2004–05	7,199	Shakhtar Donetsk	18,668
2003–04	7,724	Shakhtar Donetsk	17,931
2002–03	7,432	Shakhtar Donetsk	20,833
2001–02	9,713	Shakhtar Donetsk	25,615
2000–01	9,304	Shakhtar Donetsk	24,462
1999–2000	8,074	Kryvbas Kryvyi Rih	16,233
1998–99	7,588	Kryvbas Kryvyi Rih	15,960
1997–98	5,888	Karpaty Lviv	13,767
1996–97	5,654	Vorskla Poltava	10,587
1995–96	5,773	Zirka Kropyvnytskyi	12,324
1994–95	5,571	MFC Mykolaiv	9,600
1993–94	5,887	Veres Rivne	11,059
1992–93	5,835	Nyva Ternopil	10,725
1991–92	5,650	Nyva Ternopil	11,133

== See also ==
- Football in Crimea
- Ukraine national football team
- List of football stadiums in Ukraine
