= Serhiy Zharkov =

Ukrainian Soviet football player and coach

Personal information
- Full name: Serhiy Mykolayovych Zharkov
- Date of birth: 7 May 1958
- Place of birth: Odesa, Soviet Union
- Date of death: 26 July 2012 (aged 54)
- Place of death: Odesa, Ukraine
- Height: 1.75 m (5 ft 9 in)
- Position: Defender

Youth career
- FC Chornomorets Odesa

Senior career*
| Years | Team | Apps | (Gls) |
| 1973–1978 | FC Chornomorets Odesa | 0 | (0) |
| 1978–1980 | SKA Odesa | 66 | (4) |
| 1980–1988 | FC Chornomorets Odesa | 214 | (6) |
| 1989–1991 | did not play | | |
| 1992–1993 | SC Odesa | 38 | (0) |
| 1993 | FC Metalurh Zaporizhzhia | 0 | (0) |
| 1993–1994 | FC Blaho Blahoeve | | |
| 1995 | FC Rybak Odesa | | |
| 1996–1997 | FC SKA-Lotto Odesa (amateur) | | |
| 1997 | FC SKA-Lotto Odesa | 6 | (0) |
| 1998 | FC Rybak Odesa | | |
| 1998 | FC Syhnal Odesa | | |
| 1998–2000 | FC Kapo Pervomayske | | |

Managerial career
- 1993: SC Odesa
Medal record
Men's football
Representing Soviet Union
FIFA U-20 World Cup
| Winner | 1977 Tunisia |
- * Club domestic league appearances and goals

Serhiy Mykolayovych Zharkov (Ukrainian: Сергій Миколайович Жарков; 7 May 1958 – 26 July 2012) was a Ukrainian Soviet football player and coach.

== Honours ==
- 1977 FIFA World Youth Championship winner with the Soviet Union.
