= Avanesov =

Avanesov is a surname. Notable people with the surname include:

- Alexander Avanesov (born 1955), Soviet and Russian diplomat
- Artur Avanesov (born 1980), Armenian composer
- Varlam Avanesov (1884–1930), Armenian Bolshevik revolutionary and Soviet communist politician
- Yuriy Avanesov (1935–2012), Soviet footballer
