= Hakman =

Hakman is a surname. Notable people with the surname include:

- Berk Hakman (born 1981), Turkish actor, musician, and photographer
- Ivan Hakman (born 1955), Soviet former professional football defender and coach
- Jeff Hakman (born 1948), American surfer and businessman
- Kosta Hakman (1899-1961), Yugoslav painter
- Vasyl Hakman (born 2000), Ukrainian professional footballer

== See also ==
- Kim Hak-man (born 1976), South Korean rifle shooter
- Hackman (surname)
