= Volodymyr Smarovoz =

Soviet footballer and coach

Personal information
- Full name: Volodymyr Volodymyrovych Smarovoz
- Date of birth: 11 May 1956 (age 70)
- Place of birth: Ukrainian SSR, Soviet Union
- Height: 1.76 m (5 ft 9 1/2 in)
- Position: Defender

Youth career
- Sports school Metalurh Zaporizhzhia

Senior career*
Years	Team	Apps	(Gls)
1973–1977	FC Metalurh Zaporizhzhia	69	(5)
1978–1985	SKA Odesa	315	(11)
1993–1994	FC Birzula Kotovsk	5	(0)
1996–1997	FC Lotto-GCM Odesa	7	(0)

Managerial career
- 1991–1992: SC Odesa (ass't)
- 1992: SC Odesa
- 1993: SC Odesa (ass't)
- 1993–1994: SC Odesa
- 1994–1995: SC Odesa (ass't)
- 1997–1998: FC SKA-Lotto Odesa (ass't)
- * Club domestic league appearances and goals

Volodymyr Smarovoz (Ukrainian: Володимир Володимирович Смаровоз; 11 May 1956) is a former professional Soviet football defender and coach.

Smarovoz was one of the most played for SKA Odesa with 315 yielding only to Serhiy Marusyn.
