= Ihor Kolyada =

Ukrainian footballer

Personal information
- Full name: Ihor Vasylyovych Kolyada
- Date of birth: 7 November 1964 (age 61)
- Place of birth: Soviet Union
- Position: Forward

Senior career*
Years	Team	Apps	(Gls)
1992	Kryvbas Kryvyi Rih	23	(5)
1992–93	FC Temp Shepetivka	43	(26)
1994–95	Meliorator Kakhovka	49	(16)
1995	Metalurh Zaporizhia	3	(0)
1995	Krystal Kherson	19	(9)
1996	Polissya Zhytomyr	17	(5)
1997–00	Krystal Kherson	51	(11)
- * Club domestic league appearances and goals

Ihor Kolyada (Ukrainian: Ігор Васильович Коляда; born 7 November 1964) is a retired professional Ukrainian football forward.

Koliada became the highest scorer along with Roman Hryhorchuk when in one season when he scored 26 goals for FC Temp Shepetivka during the 1992–93 Ukrainian First League season.
