= 1993–94 Ukrainian First League =

Ukrainian First League
- Season: 1993-94
- Champions: Prykarpattia Ivano-Frankivsk
- Promoted: Prykarpattia, Evis
- Relegated: Artania, Desna
- Top goalscorer: (26) Serhiy Chuichenko (Polihraftekhnika)

1993–94 Ukrainian First League was the third season of the Ukrainian First League which was won by Prykarpattia Ivano-Frankivsk. The season started on 15 August 1993, and its final round (40th) was played on 3 July 1994. In the last round Evis Mykolaiv (Shipbuilders) snatched the ticket to the Ukrainian Premier League from under the nose of Polihraftekhnika Oleksandriya (a point ahead of the Shipbuilders) by beating Naftovyk Okhtyrka 2–1 after allowing the first goal.

The newly promoted club from Cherkasy was leading the league during the winter break and along with the Oleksandria club was the main contender for promotion. However, the second half of the season for Dnipro was terrible and they placed in the mid-table after the final round.

== Promotion and relegation ==
=== Promoted teams ===
Two clubs promoted from the 1992–93 Ukrainian Second League.

- FC Dnipro Cherkasy – champion (returning after one season)
- FC Khimik Zhytomyr – 2nd place (returning after one season)

=== Relegated teams ===
No clubs were relegated from the 1992-93 Ukrainian Top League:

=== Renamed teams ===
- FC Pryladyst Mukacheve was renamed to Karpaty Mukacheve
- FC Avtomobilist Sumy was renamed to FC SBTS Sumy

=== Teams ===
In 1993-94 season, the Ukrainian First League consists of the following teams:

Locations of teams in First League

=== Stadiums ===
The following stadiums are considered home grounds for the teams in the competition.

Rank	Stadium	Capacity	Club	Managers
1	Vorskla Stadium, Poltava	24,795	FC Vorskla Poltava	Viktor Maslov
2	Dynamo Stadium, Kyiv	16,873	FC Dynamo-2 Kyiv	Volodymyr Onyshchenko
3	Evis Stadium, Mykolaiv	15,600	FC Evis Mykolaiv	Leonid Koltun
4	SKA Stadium, Odesa	15,000	SC Odesa	Volodymyr Smarovoz
5	Gagarin Stadium, Chernihiv	12,060	FC Desna Chernihiv	Andriy Protsko
6	Avanhard Stadium, Uzhhorod	12,000	FC Zakarpattia Uzhhorod	Ivan Shanhin
7	Podillya Stadium, Khmelnytskyi	10,500	FC Nord-Am Podillya Khmelnytskyi	Volodymyr Vusatyi
8	Central city Stadium, Cherkasy	10,321	FC Dnipro Cherkasy	Semen Osynovskyi
9	Stal Stadium, Alchevsk	9,200	FC Stal Alchevsk	Anatoliy Volobuyev
10	Elektron Stadium, Ivano-Frankivsk	7,820	FC Prykarpattia Ivano-Frankivsk	Ihor Yurchenko
11	Elektrometalurh Stadium, Nikopol	7,200	FC Metalurh Nikopol	Volodymyr Nechayev
12	Sokil Stadium, Stryi	6,000	FC Skala Stryi	Yuriy Shulyatytskyi
13	Central Stadium, Zhytomyr	5,928	FC Khimik Zhytomyr	Oleksandr Ishchenko
14	Naftovyk Stadium, Okhtyrka	5,256	FC Naftovyk Okhtyrka	Andriy Biba
15	Khimik Stadium, Severodonetsk	5,000	FC Khimik Severodonetsk	Stanislav Honcharenko
16	Kharchovyk Stadium, Chortkiv	3,600	FC Krystal Chortkiv	Ivan Krasnetskyi
17	Pryladyst Stadium, Mukacheve		FC Pryladyst Mukacheve	Hryhoriy Ishchenko
18	Artania Stadium, Ochakiv		FC Artania Ochakiv	Valery Zhuravko
19	Avanhard Stadium, Sumy		FC Avtomobilist Sumy	Serhiy Strashnenko
20	Olimp Stadium, Oleksandriya		FC Polihraftekhnika Oleksandria	Yuriy Koval

== Final table ==
Pos	Team	Pld	W	D	L	GF	GA	GD	Pts	Promotion or relegation
1	Prykarpattia Ivano-Frankivsk (C, P)	38	26	7	5	81	33	+48	59	Promoted to Vyshcha Liha
2	Evis Mykolaiv (P)	38	25	6	7	76	32	+44	56	Promoted to Vyshcha Liha
3	Polihraftekhnika Oleksandria	38	22	11	5	62	22	+40	55	
4	Stal Alchevsk	38	22	7	9	56	40	+16	51	
5	Naftovyk Okhtyrka	38	19	10	9	57	28	+29	48	
6	Dnipro Cherkasy	38	19	7	12	56	39	+17	45	
7	Dynamo-2 Kyiv	38	16	8	14	50	37	+13	40	
8	Vorskla Poltava	38	15	7	16	30	52	−22	37	
9	Metalurh Nikopol	38	15	6	17	44	56	−12	36	
10	Khimik Zhytomyr	38	14	8	16	39	47	−8	36	
11	Nord-Am-Podillia Khmelnytskyi	38	13	9	16	45	47	−2	35	
12	Khimik Siverodonetsk	38	12	9	17	37	46	−9	33	
13	SC Odesa	38	12	9	17	43	54	−11	33	
14	Zakarpattia Uzhhorod	38	12	8	18	33	53	−20	32	
15	Karpaty Mukacheve	38	12	7	19	41	57	−16	31	
16	Skala Stryi	38	11	7	20	36	48	−12	29	
17	Krystal Chortkiv	38	10	9	19	29	41	−12	29	
18	SBTS Sumy	38	11	5	22	39	58	−19	27	
19	Artania Ochakiv (R)	38	9	6	23	29	69	−40	24	Relegated to Second League
20	Desna Chernihiv (R)	38	7	10	21	29	53	−24	24	Relegated to Second League

(C) Champions; (P) Promoted; (R) Relegated

Persha Liha 1993-94 Winners
Prykarpattia Ivano-Frankivsk
First title

== Top scorers ==
Statistics are taken from here.

	Scorer	Goals (Pen.)	Team
1	(Ukraine) Serhiy Chuichenko	26 (8)	Polihraftekhnika Oleksandriya
2	(Ukraine) Serhiy Turiansky	22	Prykarpattia Ivano-Frankivsk
3	(Ukraine) Oleksandr Ostashov	18	Dnipro Cherkasy
4	(Ukraine) Ruslan Zabranskyi	16 (3)	Evis Mykolaiv
4	(Ukraine) Mykola Yurchenko	16 (3)	Prykarpattia Ivano-Frankivsk
6	(Ukraine) Anatoliy Redushko	14	Skala / Prykarpattia
6	(Ukraine) Oleksiy Hrachov	14	Naftovyk Okhtyrka
6	(Ukraine) Valeriy Kudlyuk	14 (2)	Evis Mykolaiv
6	(Uzbekistan) Vakhtang Karibov	14 (9)	Pryladyst Mukacheve
10	(Ukraine) Andriy Shevchenko	12	Dynamo-2 Kyiv
10	(Ukraine) Vitaliy Chayka	12 (10)	Stal Alchevsk

== See also ==
- Ukrainian Premier League 1993–94
- Ukrainian Second League 1993–94
- Ukrainian Cup 1993-94
