= Roman Hryhorchuk =

Ukrainian football player and coach

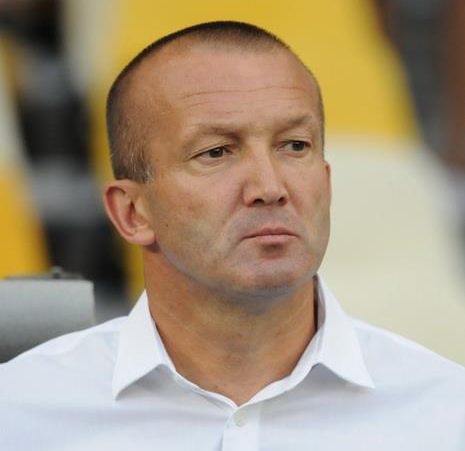
- Hryhorchuk in 2013

Personal information
- Full name: Roman Yosypovych Hryhorchuk
- Date of birth: 22 March 1965 (age 61)
- Place of birth: Kornych, Ivano-Frankivsk Oblast, Soviet Union (now Ukraine)
- Position: Forward

Team information
- Current team: Chornomorets Odesa (manager)

Youth career
- Kornych football team

Senior career*
| Years | Team | Apps | (Gls) |
| 1983 | Silmash Kolomyia | | |
| 1987 | Elektroosnastka Kolomyia | | |
| 1988 | Prykarpattya Ivano-Frankivsk | 34 | (2) |
| 1990 | Temp Shepetivka | 34 | (19) |
| 1991–1994 | Prykarpattya Ivano-Frankivsk | 111 | (63) |
| 1994 | VSE St. Poelten | 3 | (0) |
| 1994–1995 | Prykarpattya Ivano-Frankivsk | 7 | (1) |
| 1995 | Petrochemia Płock | 14 | (3) |
| 1995–1996 | Kryvbas Kryvyi Rih | 26 | (10) |
| 1996–1997 | Saturn Ramenskoye | 29 | (9) |
| 1998–2001 | Dinaburg | 63 | (30) |

Managerial career
- 1999–2000: Dinaburg (assistant)
- 2000–2005: Dinaburg
- 2005–2009: Ventspils
- 2009: Metalurh Zaporizhzhia
- 2009–2010: Metalurh Zaporizhzhia
- 2010–2014: Chornomorets Odesa
- 2014–2018: Gabala
- 2018–2020: Astana
- 2020–2021: Shakhtyor Soligorsk
- 2021–2024: Chornomorets Odesa
- 2024: Neftçi
- 2024–2025: LNZ Cherkasy
- 2026–: Chornomorets Odesa
- * Club domestic league appearances and goals

Roman Yosypovych Hryhorchuk (Ukrainian: Роман Йосипович Григорчук; born 22 March 1965) is a Ukrainian professional football manager and former player.

== Early life ==
Since the fourth grade, around 11 years of age, Hryhorchuk was interested in handball and competed for local village team at district level. For two years he never missed a training session and later had a chance to enroll in the Kyiv sports boarding school, but his mother was against it. Around that time trying to get Roman be involved in music, his father gave him a silver flute as a gift. Also, coincidentally in Kornych was created a football team for which Hryhorchuk played on weekends. Eventually Hryhorchuk graduated from Chernivtsi music school and had an opportunity to enroll in a conservatory but decided to concentrate on football career.

== Playing career ==
Following his obligatory service in the Soviet Armed Forces, he started playing for Silmash Kolomyia at amateur level in KFK competitions, until he received an invitation to Prykarpattya Ivano-Frankivsk. Hryhorchuk made his professional debut in 1988 playing for Prykarpattia at the Soviet third tier. During the 1990 season, he played for the newly created Temp Shepetivka which played at the amateur level and qualified for professional level. In 1991, he returned to Prykarpattia which placed second at the Ukrainian conference of the Soviet Second League B and qualified for the newly established Vyshcha Liha, today Ukrainian Premier League. Along with Prykarpattia, Hryhorchuk participated in the first season of the league, playing only six games. Due to poor performance, the club relegated moving to the second tier. During the 1992–93 Persha Liha season, Hryhorchuk was one of the top league scorers and scored his first career hat-trick in a home win against Avtomobilist Sumy. During the winter break of the next season, he was transferred to St. Poelten which played in the 1993–94 Austrian Football Bundesliga. He appeared in three matches as VSE St. Poelten eventually relegated, while Hryhorchuk returned to Prykarpattia. At the same time the Ivano-Frankivsk club placed first at the second tier and qualified again for the top division. Without finishing the first half of the 1994–95 Vyshcha Liha season, in October Hryhorchuk moved to Petrochemia Plock. Following the 1994–95 season, Petrochemia Płock was relegated and Hryhorchuk returned to Ukraine. For the 1995–96 season, he joined Kryvbas Kryvyi Rih, before moving to Russian second tier club Saturn Ramenskoye at the end of the season. During mid-season of 1997, Hryhorchuk moved to Latvian Virsliga club Dinaburg, but did not play a match for the first team until the next season. In 1998, he finally made his debut in the European clubs' competitions, the Intertoto Cup. In 1998, Dinaburg placed 4th in the league, with and was Hryhorchuk ending the season as a runner-up among the league's top scorers with 21 goals.

== Coaching career ==
In his coaching career, he was a successful manager in Latvia with Ventspils winning the Latvian championship three times from 2006 to 2008 as well as the Latvian Cup in 2005 and 2007.

During the 2009–10 Ukrainian Premier League season, Hryhorchuk was hired by Metalurh Zaporizhzhia. He stayed in that position only until the end of the season, though.

On 16 November 2010, Hryhorchuk was appointed as the manager of Chornomorets Odesa. He brought the club back into the Ukrainian Premier League after his 1st season in charge. On April 6, 2014, Roman Hryhorchuk managed his 100th match in the UPL as head coach of Chornomorets Odesa.

Hryhorchuk was appointed manager of Azerbaijan Premier League side Gabala on 21 December 2014, on an 18-month contract. On 20 December 2015, Hryhorchuk extended his Gabala contract for another season, until the end of the 2016–17 season. Following defeat to Keşla in the 2017–18 Azerbaijan Cup final, Hryhorchuk left Gabala after his contract was not extended. Roman Hryhorchuk was the first Gabala coach in the club's history to lead the team to group stages of UEFA Europa League two consecutive seasons. In their European campaigns, Gabala achieved wins over teams such as Panathinaikos, LOSC Lille, and Maribor.

On 1 June 2018, Astana announced Hryhorchuk as their new manager. On 13 January 2020, Hryhorchuk left Astana by mutual consent. In his first year, Hryhorchuk took Astana to group stage of Europa League where they competed with Dynamo Kyiv, Rennes and Jablonec. In his second season in charge, Astana again reached the group stages of Europa League, where they achieved a 2–1 home win over Manchester United.

On 5 September 2020, he was hired by Belarusian club Shakhtyor Soligorsk.

On 26 June 2024 Hryhorchuk signed a 2-year contract with Azerbaijan Premier League club Neftçi, becoming the club's head coach. On 7 October 2024 his contract with the club was terminated by mutual agreement. Under his leadership, Neftçi played in 9 rounds of the Azerbaijani Premier League, recording 5 draws and 4 losses.

In December 2024, Roman Hryhorchuk returned to Ukraine and headed FC LNZ Cherkasy. After the end of the 2024–25 season, Hryhorchuk left the club.

On January 14, 2026, Hryhorchuk was appointed head coach of Chornomorets Odesa for the third time in his career. On October 17, 2026, Roman Hryhorchuk managed his 200th match in the UPL as head coach of Chornomorets Odesa.

== Managerial statistics ==
As of match played 31 August 2024

| Team | Nat | From | To | Record | | | | |
| Team | Nat | From | To | G | W | D | L | Win % |
|---|---|---|---|---|---|---|---|---|
| Dinaburg | (Latvia) | 2000 | 30 June 2005 | 183 | 78 | 30 | 75 | 42.6 |
| Ventspils | (Latvia) | 1 July 2005 | 11 August 2009 | 165 | 110 | 26 | 29 | 66.7 |
| Metalurh Z | (Ukraine) | 22 October 2009 | 11 November 2009 | 3 | 1 | 1 | 1 | 33.3 |
| Metalurh Z | (Ukraine) | 9 December 2009 | 9 May 2010 | 14 | 7 | 1 | 6 | 50.0 |
| Chornomorets Odesa | (Ukraine) | 16 November 2010 | 16 December 2014 | 148 | 62 | 39 | 47 | 41.9 |
| Gabala | (Azerbaijan) | 21 December 2014 | 29 May 2018 | 159 | 75 | 41 | 43 | 47.2 |
| Astana | (Kazakhstan) | 1 June 2018 | 13 January 2020 | 62 | 37 | 8 | 17 | 59.7 |
| Shakhtyor Soligorsk | (Belarus) | 5 September 2020 | 23 July 2021 | 32 | 23 | 2 | 7 | 71.9 |
| Chornomorets Odesa | (Ukraine) | 30 December 2021 | 26 June 2024 | 73 | 24 | 10 | 39 | 32.9 |
| Neftçi | (Azerbaijan) | 26 June 2024 | 7 October 2024 | 9 | 0 | 5 | 4 | 0.0 |
| LNZ Cherkasy | (Ukraine) | 18 December 2024 | 26 May 2025 | 13 | 2 | 6 | 5 | 15.4 |
| Chornomorets Odesa | (Ukraine) | 14 January 2026 | | 23 | 10 | 6 | 7 | 43.5 |
| Total | | | | 884 | 429 | 175 | 280 | 48.5 |

== Honours ==
=== As a player ===
Temp Shepetivka

- KFK competitions: 1990 (group winner)

Prykarpattya Ivano-Frankivsk

- Ukrainian First League: 1993–94

Individual

- Ukrainian First League top scorer: 1992–93 Ukrainian First League

=== As a manager ===
Ventspils

- Virslīga: 2006, 2007, 2008
- Latvian Cup: 2005, 2007
- Livonia Cup: 2008

Chornomorets Odesa

- Ukrainian First League runner-up: 2010–11, 2025–26
- Ukrainian Cup runners-up: 2012–13
- Ukrainian Super Cup runners-up: 2013

Astana

- Kazakhstan Premier League: 2018, 2019
- Kazakhstan Super Cup: 2018, 2019, 2020

Shakhtyor Soligorsk

- Belarusian Premier League: 2020

Individual

- Ukrainian Premier League Manager of the Month: February–March 2023, July–August 2023
