= Vladlen Naumenko =

Soviet footballer and coach (1947–2024)

Personal information
- Full name: Vladlen Vasylyovych Naumenko
- Date of birth: 5 November 1947
- Place of birth: Orsha, Vitebsk Oblast, Belarusian SSR, USSR
- Date of death: 16 November 2024 (aged 77)
- Height: 1.78 m (5 ft 10 in)
- Position: Midfielder

Senior career*
| Years | Team | Apps | (Gls) |
| 1964–1970 | Avanhard Ternopil | 116 | (7) |
| 1971 | Sudnobudivnyk Mykolaiv | 50 | (3) |
| 1972 | Metallurg Shymkent | | |
| 1972–1973 | Zvezda Tiraspol | ? | (1+) |
| 1974 | Nistru Kishinev | 0 | (0) |
| 1974–1980 | Sudnobudivnyk Mykolaiv | 204 | (6) |
| 1980 | Krystal Kherson | 15 | (1) |

Managerial career
- 1980: FC Okean Mykolaiv
- 1981: Sudnobudivnyk Mykolaiv (assistant coach)
- 1982–1991: Sports school Mykolaiv (academy)
- 1992: FC Evis Mykolaiv
- 1992–2006: Sports school Mykolaiv (academy)
- 2006–2007: MFC Mykolaiv-2
- * Club domestic league appearances and goals

Vladlen Naumenko (Ukrainian: Владлен Васильович Науменко; 5 November 1947 – 16 November 2024) was a Soviet professional football midfielder and Ukrainian coach. He died on 16 November 2024, at the age of 77.

== Honours ==
Avanhard Ternopil

- Football Championship of the Ukrainian SSR: 1968

Sudnobudivnyk Mykolaiv

- Football Championship of the Ukrainian SSR: 1974
