= Volodymyr Nechayev =

Soviet footballer and coach (1950–2021)

Personal information
- Full name: Volodymyr Viktorovych Nechayev
- Date of birth: 4 August 1950
- Place of birth: Zatoka, Ukrainian SSR, Soviet Union
- Date of death: 3 May 2021 (aged 70)
- Place of death: Odesa, Ukraine
- Height: 1.77 m (5 ft 10 in)
- Position: Defender

Youth career
- 1962–196?: SKA Odesa
- 196?–1967: RVUFK Kyiv
- 1967–1969: Chornomorets Odesa

Senior career*
Years	Team	Apps	(Gls)
1968–1976	Chornomorets Odesa	210	(10)
1977	CSKA Moscow		
1977	SKA Odesa	43	(12)
1978–1979	Chornomorets Odesa	43	(0)
1979–1980	Pakhtakor Tashkent	28	(3)
1981–1982	Kolos Nikopol	103	(17)

Managerial career
- 1983–1985: Chornomorets Odesa (ass't)
- 1985: Kolos Nikopol (ass't)
- 1986–1988: Chornomorets Odesa (scout)
- 1989–1994: Kolos/Metalurh Nikopol
- 1994–1995: Odesa (team chief)
- 1995–1996: Khimik Zhytomyr
- 1997: Transmash Mogilev
- 1997–1999: Uralan Elista (scout)
- 2002–2003: Kolos Nikopol
- 2003–2004: Olkom Melitopol
- 2005: FC Obriy Nikopol
- 2005–2007: Enerhiya Yuzhnoukrainsk
- * Club domestic league appearances and goals

Volodymyr Nechayev (Ukrainian: Володимир Вікторович Нечаєв; 4 August 1950 – 3 May 2021) was a Soviet professional footballer and coach.

Nechayev started at 12 in the sports school (DYuSSh) of SKA Odesa. With Chornomorets and Pakhtakor, Nechayev played some 166 games at the Soviet Top League.
