= Vladimir Brukhti =

Azerbaijani footballer (1945–2004)

Personal information
- Full name: Vladimir Petrovich Brukhti
- Date of birth: 11 June 1945
- Place of birth: Baku, USSR
- Date of death: 16 July 2004 (aged 59)
- Place of death: Baku, Azerbaijan
- Height: 1.83 m (6 ft 0 in)
- Position: Defender

Youth career
- Neftyanik Baku

Senior career*
Years	Team	Apps	(Gls)
1963–1972	Neftyanik Baku	258	(2)

Managerial career
- 1992–1993: Vorskla Poltava
- 1993–1995: Kryvbas Kryvyi Rih
- * Club domestic league appearances and goals

Vladimir Petrovich Brukhti (Russian: Владимир Петрович Брухтий; 11 June 1945 – 16 July 2004) was an Azerbaijani footballer. Brukhti played for Neftchi Baku as a defenseman from 1963 to 1972. He was classified as a Master of Sport of the USSR in 1966 following Neftchi's third-place finish in the Soviet Top League that year.
