= Yuriy Chyrkov =

Soviet footballer and coach (1947–2014)

Personal information
- Full name: Yuriy Ivanovych Chyrkov
- Date of birth: 22 December 1947
- Place of birth: Korolevo, Ukrainian SSR, Soviet Union
- Date of death: 19 April 2014 (aged 66)
- Place of death: Uzhhorod, Ukraine
- Height: 1.71 m (5 ft 7 1/2 in)
- Position: Midfielder

Senior career*
Years	Team	Apps	(Gls)
1965	FC Lokomotyv Korolevo		
1966	FC Verkhovyna Uzhhorod	20	(1)
1969–1970	FC Karpaty Mukacheve		
1971–1980	FC Hoverla Uzhhorod	365	(19)

Managerial career
- 1982: FC Zakarpattia Uzhhorod (ass't)
- 1987: FC Zakarpattia Uzhhorod (ass't)
- 1989–1990: FC Zakarpattia Uzhhorod (ass't)
- 1991–1992: FC Zakarpattia Uzhhorod (team chief)
- 1992–1993: FC Zakarpattia Uzhhorod
- 1995: FC Zakarpattia Uzhhorod
- * Club domestic league appearances and goals

Yuriy Chyrkov (Ukrainian: Юрій Іванович Чирков; 22 December 1947 – 19 April 2014) was a professional Soviet football midfielder and coach.
