= Alexander Avanesov =

Soviet and Russian diplomat

Alexander Nikolaevich Avanesov (Russian:Александр Николаевич Аванесов; born January 9, 1955) is a Soviet and Russian diplomat, the United Nations Resident Coordinator/UNDP Resident Representative in the Kyrgyz Republic (2011-2017) and in Montenegro (2008-2011), Deputy Resident Representative of UNDP in Armenia (2004-2008). From 1984 to 1994 he worked in the Department of International Economic Organizations of the Ministry of Foreign Affairs of the USSR/the Russian Federation, in the Permanent Mission of the USSR to the United Nations (1986) and then of the Russian Federation (1994). From 1994 he started working for the United Nations.

== Biography ==
=== Early life and education ===
Alexander Avanesov was born on January 9, 1955, in Moscow to Nikolai Avanesov (1922 – 1983) and Valentina Smirnova (1920 – 2004). His father was a Colonel in the Soviet Army, and fought in the Second World War, receiving two Orders of the Red Banner, the Medal of the Order of Merit for the Motherland, numerous other medals, including The Medal for Bravery. Alexander finished the Moscow School No. 141 with a certificate of merit. In 1977 he graduated from the Moscow State Institute of International Relations (MGIMO) of the USSR Ministry of Foreign Affairs with academic distinction (“magna cum laude”), specialty in International Economic Relations with Knowledge of Japanese and English.

In 1981 he completed his postgraduate studies at the Faculty of International Economic Relations, MGIMO. He holds a PhD in Economic Science. He is the author of a number of scientific articles on energy and raw materials problems of global economy.

=== Career ===
1980-1984 Assistant professor at MGIMO, the author of the course "Economics of Japan" and "National Economy of the USSR";

1984 - 1986 – served as the Second Secretary of the Department of International Economic Organizations of the Ministry of Foreign Affairs of the USSR;

1986 - 1994 – Second, then First Secretary of the Department of Economics of the Permanent Mission of the USSR / Russia to the United Nations in New York (in 1994 he was assigned to the rank of Counselor);

1994 - 1997 - Regional Programme Manager and Programme Specialist at the Regional Bureau of the United Nations Development Programme for Europe and the CIS (New York);

1997-2001 – acting Deputy Representative and Senior Regional Adviser for Europe and the CIS at the UNDP Representative Office in the Russian Federation (Moscow);

2001-2004 - Programme Specialist of the UNDP Regional Bureau for Europe and the CIS (New York);

2004-2008 - Deputy of UNDP Resident Representative in Armenia;

2008-2011- UN Resident Coordinator, UNDP Resident Representative in Montenegro;

2011-2017 - UN Resident Coordinator, UNDP Resident Representative in the Kyrgyz Republic;

since June 2017 - Global Programme Manager, Special Advisor on Prevention of Violent Extremism at the Bureau for Policy and Programme Support, United Nations Development Programme (New York).

== Private life ==
Alexander Avanesov is married and has two daughters and five grandchildren that are named Gregori, Lev, Lucas, Alexandra, Olivia and Isabella.

== Publications ==
- Book - "Japan - Finding Solutions to Energy and Raw Materials Problems"
- Textbook - "Economics of Japan"

== Awards ==
He was acknowledged with state awards of the Kyrgyz Republic and Montenegro for numerous contributions to the development of these countries. Major achievements in professional activities include:

- the promotion of the role of UN in the countries with transition economy and adoption in 1988 in the UN Commission on Transnational Corporations of * the Soviet draft of the UN Resolution on the development of new forms of foreign economic relations. This initiative allowed using of UN technical assistance capacities in support of promoting joint ventures on the territory of the former USSR:;
- Initiate and implementation of programmes and projects in the Kyrgyz Republic in the field of sustainable development and peacebuilding. Implementation of the area-based development projects for the UN Development Programme in Naryn and Osh regions of Kyrgyzstan, which were carried out with the financial support of Russia, New Zealand and Finland, promotion of socio-economic development of settlements and communities near uranium tailings with support of the Russian Federation.

== Links ==
=== In English ===
1. http://kg.one.un.org/content/unct/kyrgyzstan/en/home/we/undp/Alexander_Avanessov.html
2. http://old.kabar.kg/eng/personnel-policy/full/2273
3. https://mail.google.com/mail/u/0/#inbox/15c1b84ed87c6133?projector=1

=== In Russian ===
1. http://www.kg.undp.org/content/kyrgyzstan/ru/home/operations/resident-representative.html
2. http://alumni.mgimo.ru/page/adaptive/news/13250/?ssoRedirect=true
3. http://www.trend.az/casia/kyrgyzstan/1907461.html
4. https://rus.azattyk.org/a/kyrgyzstan_un_avanesov/24516577.html
