= Ivan Hakman =

Soviet footballer and coach

Personal information
- Full name: Ivan Vasylyovych Hakman
- Date of birth: 18 January 1955 (age 71)
- Place of birth: Chernivtsi, Ukrainian SSR, Soviet Union
- Height: 1.83 m (6 ft 0 in)
- Position: Defender

Youth career
- FC Bukovyna Chernivtsi

Senior career*
Years	Team	Apps	(Gls)
1972	FC Cheremosh Chernivtsi		
1974–1975	SKA Lvov		
1976	FC Bukovyna Chernivtsi	38	(1)
1977–1978	FC Chornomorets Odesa	7	(1)
1979	SKA Odessa	25	(2)
1980	FC Krystal Kherson	42	(3)
1981–1987	FC Bukovyna Chernivtsi	263	(10)
1989	FC Zaria Balti	2	(0)
1991	FC Lada Chernivtsi	?	(7)
1992–1993	FC Krystal Chortkiv	46	(4)
1993	FC Karpaty Chernivtsi		
1993	FC Dnister Zalishchyky	4	(1)
1994–1995	FC Lada Chernivtsi	29	(1)
1993	FC Advis Khmelnytskyi	1	(0)

Managerial career
- 1992–1993: FC Krystal Chortkiv
- * Club domestic league appearances and goals

Ivan Hakman (Ukrainian: Іван Васильович Гакман; 18 January 1955) is a former professional Soviet football defender and coach.
