= FC Artania Ochakiv =

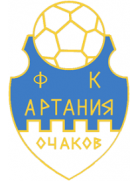
- Full name: FC Artania Ochakiv
- Dissolved: 1995
Home colours

FC Artania Ochakiv was a Ukrainian football club from Ochakiv, Mykolaiv Oblast.

== History ==
The city team Mayak Ochakov (Ochakiv) first appeared in 1987 at the championship of Mykolaiv Oblast. Previously Ochakiv was represented since 1950s by such teams like "Medik" (1950s), "Pishchevik", "Chernomorets" (1960s), "Kolos" (1970s). The new team appeared on initiative of Ochakiv native Valery Zhuravko.

In 1995 it was merged with FC Enerhiya Yuzhnoukrainsk.

The club's football academy was preserved and in 1997 it participated in international competitions in Sweden.

In 2014 there was created new club FC Ochakiv.

== Honours ==
- Soviet football cup among teams KFK
  - Winners (1): 1990
- Football championship of Mykolaiv Oblast
  - Winners (1): 1989

== League and Cup History ==
Season	Div.	Pos.	Pl.	W	D	L	GS	GA	P	Domestic Cup	Europe	Notes
Mayak Ochakiv
1989	4th "5"	1	24	20	2	2	51	14	42			Final group
1989	4th "5"	2	5	3	0	2	7	7	6			
1990	4th "5"	1	30	20	8	2	66	18	48			Final group
1990	4th "5"	2	5	3	0	2	7	5	6			Promoted
1991	3rd (lower) "1"	23	50	15	10	25	51	76	40			Joined Ukrainian championship
Artania Ochakiv
1992	2nd "B"	3	26	13	6	7	27	24	32			
1992–93	2nd	18	42	15	5	22	42	73	35			
1993–94	2nd	19	38	9	6	23	29	69	24			Relegated
1994–95	3rd	15	42	13	8	21	30	58	47	1/64 finals		Merged

== Coaches ==
- 1987 – 1994 Valery Zhuravko
- 1994 – 1995 Viktor Stepanov
