= FC SKA Odesa =

SKA Odesa
- Full name: SKA Odesa
- Founded: 2011
- Dissolved: 2013
- Ground: Spartak Stadium, Odesa
- Capacity: 4,800
- League: Ukrainian Second League

SKA Odesa (Ukrainian: Товариство з обмеженою відповідальністю «Футбольний клуб „СКА“», Society with a limited liability "Football club SKA") was a Ukrainian associated football club based in Odesa, Ukraine from 2011 until February 2013. The club was named as SKA Odesa out of nostalgic feelings for the past Soviet football club out of Odesa. The Professional Football League of Ukraine informed that the Ukrainian club cannot claim its heritage to it.

== History ==
The club was founded in 2011 under a memorial name of SKA Odesa, which is a name for the Soviet Army football club of the Odesa Military District that used to compete in the Soviet competitions (1944–1992) and later as a city team SC Odesa in the Ukrainian competitions (1992–1999).

The current (former) club was formed in 2010 by former players and training staff of the Soviet team. The team began competing in the Odesa City League competition advancing to the Odesa Oblast completion. In 2012 the team participated in the Ukrainian Amateur competition (4th Level) placing last in its group and applied to rejoin the PFL.

The club was competing in the Ukrainian Second League in the 2012–13 season. In February 2013 the club dissolved itself due to lack of sufficient funding after again finishing last in its group.

Season	Div.	Pos	Pl.	W	D	L	GS	GA	P	Domestic Cup	Europe	Notes
2012	4th	7	12	1	1	10	6	19	4			
2012–13	3rd "A"	11	20	4	2	14	17	33	14	1/64 finals		withdrew

== See also ==
- SKA-Lotto Odesa
