= Yuriy Avanesov =

Soviet football player and coach (1935–2012)

Personal information
- Full name: Yuriy Arkadiyovych (Artashesovych) Avanesov
- Date of birth: 16 August 1935
- Place of birth: Baku, Azerbaijan SSR, Soviet Union
- Date of death: 19 August 2012 (aged 77)
- Place of death: Khmelnytskyi, Ukraine

Senior career*
Years	Team	Apps	(Gls)
1961	FC Avanhard Kamianets-Podilskyi		

Managerial career
- 1958: SC KKF Baku
- 1962: FC Volyn Lutsk (ass't)
- 1963–1969: FC Dynamo Khmelnytskyi (ass't)
- 1970–1971: FC Torpedo Lutsk
- 1971–1972: FC Dolotnyk Drohobych
- 1972–1973: FC Lokomotyv Donetsk (team chief)
- 1973–1974: FC Dynamo Khmelnytskyi
- 1975: FC Khvylya Khmelnytskyi (ass't)
- 1975–1977: FC Lokomotyv Vinnytsia
- 1978: FC Podillya Khmelnytskyi (team chief)
- 1978–1979: Sports school 1 Khmelnytskyi (academy)
- 1980–1981: FC Dnipro Cherkasy (team chief)
- 1982–1983: FC Prykarpattia Ivano-Frankivsk (team chief)
- 1983: FC Prykarpattia Ivano-Frankivsk
- 1984–1985: Sports school Prykarpattia Ivano-Frankivsk (academy)
- 1985–1992: Sports school 1 (Podillya) Khmelnytskyi (director)
- 1992: FC Podillya Khmelnytskyi
- 1993–1997: Sports school Podillya Khmelnytskyi (director)
- 1998–1999: FC Podillya Khmelnytskyi
- * Club domestic league appearances and goals

Yuriy Avanesov (Ukrainian: Юрій Аркадійович (Арташесович) Аванесов; 16 August 1935 – 19 August 2012) is a former professional Soviet footballer and coach.
