= FC SKA-Lotto Odesa =

FC SKA-Lotto Odesa was a Ukrainian football club from Odesa, Odesa Oblast.

== League and cup history ==
Season	Div.	Pos.	Pl.	W	D	L	GS	GA	P	Domestic Cup	Europe	Notes
