= SC Odesa =

Former Ukrainian football team

- Full name: ODO Odesa (1944–1957); SKVO Odesa (1957–1960); SKA Odesa (1960–1992); SC Odesa (1992–1999)
- Founded: 1944, 1992 (reorganized)
- Dissolved: 1999 (merged with FC Chornomorets Odesa)
- Ground: SKA Stadium
- Capacity: 30,000
- League: Soviet Second League; Ukrainian Second League

SC Odesa is a Ukrainian former football team that appeared in 1992 following the reorganization of the Soviet SKA Odesa. The new city municipal team was located in Odesa, Ukraine and previously at one point was part of the Soviet Army sport system.

== Brief history ==
The club was founded as a sport society of various disciplines in 1944. It began its legacy in the Soviet sport competitions under the name of ODO (Okruzhnoy Dom Offitserov), which meant Regional Officers' Club in Russian. There were many similar Army clubs in various cities across the whole USSR, with the central one being in Moscow. Since 1957 all of them changed names to SKVO (Sport Club of Military District), the club became SKVO Odesa. In 1960 it became SKA (Sport Club of the Army) for all Army clubs except the Moscow one, which became CSKA (the Central Sport Club of the Army). In 1970s it represented the city of Tiraspol in Moldavian SSR, after Tiraspol's team Dnestr Tiraspol was disbanded in 1971. The Odesa sport club was primarily sponsored by the Odesa Military District.

=== Football section ===
For two seasons (1965 and 1966) the football team participated in the Soviet Top League. After the fall of the Soviet Union, SKA Odesa reformed due to lack of funding. The clubs football section reorganized as a separate club sponsored by the city of Odesa and was renamed simply 'SK Odesa' (without the Army part). The new club took part in the first Ukrainian Premier League season in 1992, after being chosen to participate for being one of the top 9 (of 11) Ukrainian teams from the West Division of the Soviet Second League in 1991. At the end of the first season with the fewest points the team was subjected to relegation. Also by the end of the season it changed its name to SK Odesa (SC Odesa), because the Odesa Military District, the main sponsor, was disbanded. The club got rescued financially by the municipal government. It never again returned to the Premier League and in 1997 it was relegated to the Druha Liha. The club won the Druha Liha championship convincingly in 1999, but folded because of a shortage of funds. The players were all bought by FC Chornomorets Odesa and formed the club's second team FC Chornomorets-2 Odesa.

== Honors ==
- Cup of the Ukrainian SSR
  - Winners (1): 1957
- Championship of the Ukrainian SSR
  - Winners (3): 1957, 1963, 1977
  - Runners-up (1): 1961
- Ukrainian Second League
  - Winners (1): 1998/99 (Group B)

== League and Cup history ==
=== Soviet competitions ===
Season	Div.	Pos.	Pl.	W	D	L	GS	GA	P	Domestic Cup	Europe	Notes
1989	3rd	7	52	17	25	10	58	44	59			
1990	3rd	6	42	21	7	14	59	32	49			
1991	3rd	10	42	18	7	17	46	42	43			

=== Ukrainian competitions ===
Season	Div.	Pos.	Pl.	W	D	L	GS	GA	P	Domestic Cup	Europe	Notes
1992	1st "B"	10	18	3	1	15	32	36	7	1/16 finals		Relegated
1992–93	2nd	12	42	15	10	17	54	61	40	1/32 finals		
1993–94	2nd	13	38	12	9	17	43	54	33	1/32 finals		
1994–95	2nd	12	42	16	8	18	51	51	56	1/16 finals		
1995–96	2nd	18	42	11	11	20	35	63	44	1/32 finals		
1996–97	2nd	21	46	14	8	24	47	79	50	1/64 finals		Relegated
1997–98	3rd "B"	3	32	18	7	7	48	29	61	1/32 finals		
1998–99	3rd "B"	1	26	22	2	2	73	13	68	1/8 finals		Promoted
1999-00	Refer to FC Chornomorets-2 Odesa											

== See also ==
- Odesa Military District
- FC Chornomorets-2 Odesa
- CS Tiligul-Tiras Tiraspol
