= 1992 SC Tavriya Simferopol season =

Tavriya Simferopol
1992 season
- Manager: Anatoliy Zayayev
- Stadium: RSC Lokomotyv
- Vyshcha Liha: 1st (champions)
- Ukrainian Cup: Second preliminary round (1/16)
Home colours

The 1992 season was the first season in the top Ukrainian football league for Tavriya Simferopol. Tavriya competed in Vyshcha Liha, and Ukrainian Cup.

== Players ==
=== Squad information ===
Squad no.	Name	Nationality	Position	Date of birth (age)
Goalkeepers
10	Dmitri Gulenkov	(Russia)	GK	22 May 1968 (aged 24)
12	Oleh Kolesov	(Ukraine)	GK	15 February 1969 (aged 23)
	Borys Beloshapka	(Ukraine)	GK	9 February 1962 (aged 30)
	Andriy Tarakhtiy	(Ukraine)	GK	11 July 1969 (aged 22)
	Andriy Boryachynskyi	(Ukraine)	GK	6 January 1973 (aged 19)
Defenders
1	Sefer Alibaev	(Uzbekistan)	DF	5 May 1968 (aged 24)
3	Vidmantas Vyšniauskas	(Lithuania)	DF	15 September 1969 (aged 22)
4	Ihor Volkov	(Ukraine)	DF	13 May 1965 (aged 27)
5	Serhiy Voronezhskyi	(Ukraine)	DF	25 June 1967 (aged 24)
6	Yuri Getikov	(Russia)	DF	19 June 1971 (aged 21)
8	Oleksandr Holovko	(Ukraine)	DF	6 January 1972 (aged 20)
16	Vladislav Novikov	(Russia)	DF	6 September 1971 (aged 20)
18	Dmitri Smirnov	(Russia)	DF	14 August 1969 (aged 22)
19	Mykola Turchynenko	(Kyrgyzstan)	DF	24 April 1961 (aged 31)
Midfielders
11	Serhiy Yesin	(Ukraine)	MF	2 April 1975 (aged 17)
13	Oleksandr Kundenok	(Kazakhstan)	MF	11 November 1973 (aged 18)
14	Yuriy Mikhaylus	(Ukraine)	MF	17 June 1964 (aged 28)
	Pavlo Skoryk	(Ukraine)	MF	3 April 1969 (aged 23)
	Oleksandr Yevtushok	(Ukraine)	MF	11 January 1970 (aged 22)
	Ihor Yershov	(Ukraine)	MF	16 March 1972 (aged 20)
	Oleksandr Tarabryn	(Ukraine)	MF	28 January 1973 (aged 19)
	Andriy Nikiforov	(Ukraine)	MF	23 January 1969 (aged 23)
	Sincha		?	
	Shyrabokov		?	
Forwards
2	Sergey Andreyev	(Uzbekistan)	FW	14 September 1970 (aged 21)
7	Sergei Gladyshev	(Russia)	FW	9 December 1960 (aged 31)
9	Yuriy Hudymenko	(Ukraine)	FW	10 March 1966 (aged 26)
15	Marat Mulashev	(Russia)	FW	7 January 1968 (aged 24)
17	Andriy Oparin	(Ukraine)	FW	27 May 1968 (aged 24)
20	Serhiy Shevchenko (Captain)	(Kyrgyzstan)	FW	15 May 1960 (aged 32)
21	Talyat Sheikhametov	(Uzbekistan)	FW	24 April 1966 (aged 26)
	Vitaliy Yefimov	(Ukraine)	FW	4 October 1969 (aged 22)

== Transfers ==
=== In ===
Date	Pos.	Player	Age	Moving from	Type	Fee	Source

=== Out ===
Date	Pos.	Player	Age	Moving to	Type	Fee	Source

== Competitions ==
=== Overall ===
Competition	First match	Last match	Starting round	Final position	Record							
Competition	First match	Last match	Starting round	Final position	Pld	W	D	L	GF	GA	GD	Win %
Premier League	7 March 1992	21 June 1992	Matchday 1	1st	19	12	6	1	31	9	+22	63.16
Ukrainian Cup	16 February 1992	23 February 1992	First preliminary (1/32)	Second preliminary (1/16)	2	1	0	1	3	3	+0	50.00
Soviet Cup	17 April 1991	17 April 1991	First round (1/128)	First round (1/128)	1	0	0	1	0	3	−3	0.00
Total					22	13	6	3	34	15	+19	59.09

Source: Competitions

=== Premier League ===
==== League table ====
Pos	Team	Pld	W	D	L	GF	GA	GD	Pts	Qualification or relegation
1	Tavriya Simferopol (C)	18	11	6	1	30	9	+21	28	Qualification to Final playoff
2	Shakhtar Donetsk	18	10	6	2	31	10	+21	26	Qualification to Third place playoff
3	Chornomorets Odesa	18	9	7	2	30	12	+18	25	Qualification to Cup Winners' Cup qualifying round
4	Torpedo Zaporizhzhia	18	6	7	5	21	16	+5	19	
5	Metalurh Zaporizhzhia	18	6	6	6	20	19	+1	18	

Updated to match(es) played on unknown. Source:
Rules for classification: 1st points; 2nd wins; 3rd goal difference
(C) Champions

==== Results summary ====
Overall								Home						Away					
Pld	W	D	L	GF	GA	GD	Pts	W	D	L	GF	GA	GD	W	D	L	GF	GA	GD
18	11	6	1	30	9	+21	39	8	1	0	21	3	+18	3	5	1	9	6	+3

Source: 1992 Tavriya season

==== Results by round ====
Round	1	2	3	4	5	6	7	8	9	10	11	12	13	14	15	16	17	18	19	20
Ground	H	H	A	A	H	H	A		A	A	H	H	H		A	A	H	H	A	A
Result	W	D	W	L	W	W	D		W	D	W	W	W		D	W	W	W	D	D
Position	1	2	1	2	1	1	1	1	1	1	1	1	1	1	1	1	1	1	1	1

Source: 1992 Tavriya season
A = Away; H = Home; W = Win; D = Draw; L = Loss

==== Matches ====
7 March 1992 1	Tavriya Simferopol	2–0	Torpedo Zaporizhzhia	Simferopol
?:? EET (UTC+02:00)	Shevchenko 58'; Volkov 77' (pen.); Vyšniauskas (yellow card) 78'	Report	Zayets (yellow card) 30'	Stadium: RSC Lokomotyv; Attendance: 1,300; Referee: Valeriy Soyan

10 March 1992 2	Tavriya Simferopol	1–1	Shakhtar Donetsk	Simferopol
?:? EET (UTC+02:00)	Shevchenko 65'	Report	Fokin (yellow card) 24'; Drahunov 49' (pen.); Stolovytskyi (yellow card) 66'	Stadium: RSC Lokomotyv; Attendance: 2,000; Referee: Oleksandr Dehtyaryov

18 March 1992 3	Karpaty Lviv	0–2	Tavriya Simferopol	Lviv
?:? EET (UTC+02:00)		Report	Hudymenko 1'; Holovko (yellow card) 59'; Novikov 89'	Stadium: Ukraina Stadium; Attendance: 13,000; Referee: Ihor Khiblin

21 March 1992 4	Temp Shepetivka	1–0	Tavriya Simferopol	Shepetivka
?:? EET (UTC+02:00)	Dovhalets 89' (pen.)	Report		Stadium: Temp Stadium; Attendance: 8,000; Referee: Ihor Bezuhlyi

27 March 1992 5	Tavriya Simferopol	1–0	Chornomorets Odesa	Simferopol
?:? EET (UTC+02:00)	Gladyshev 76'	Report	Yablonskyi (yellow card) 36'	Stadium: RSC Lokomotyv; Attendance: 2,900; Referee: Stepan Selmenskyi

30 March 1992 6	Tavriya Simferopol	1–0	Evis Mykolaiv	Simferopol
?:? EET (UTC+02:00)	Shevchenko 31' (pen.)	Report		Stadium: RSC Lokomotyv; Attendance: 1,150; Referee: Viktor Holovko

5 April 1992 7	Metalurh Zaporizhzhia	2–2	Tavriya Simferopol	Zaporizhzhia
?:? EET (UTC+02:00)	Vernydub (yellow card) 67'; Taran 76'; Shkapenko 87'	Report	Andreev 74'; Gladyshev 85'	Stadium: Metalurh Stadium; Attendance: 6,500; Referee: Serhiy Tatulyan

16 April 1992 9	Nyva Vinnytsia	0–1	Tavriya Simferopol	Vinnytsia
?:? EET (UTC+02:00)		Report	Hudymenko 48'	Stadium: Lokomotyv Stadium; Attendance: 9,500; Referee: Ihor Khiblin

19 April 1992 10	Kremin Kremenchuk	1–1	Tavriya Simferopol	Kremenchuk
?:? EET (UTC+02:00)	Korponai 20'	Report	Shevchenko 67'	Stadium: Dnipro Stadium; Attendance: 10,900; Referee: Valeriy Onufer

25 April 1992 11	Tavriya Simferopol	4–1	Nyva Vinnytsia	Simferopol
?:? EET (UTC+02:00)	Shevchenko 26' (pen.); Gladyshev 34'; Hudymenko 85', 88'	Report	Kulakov 68'	Stadium: RSC Lokomotyv; Attendance: 2,100; Referee: Oleksandr Lytvynenko

28 April 1992 12	Tavriya Simferopol	3–0	Kremin Kremenchuk	Simferopol
?:? EET (UTC+02:00)	Gladyshev 9'; Hudymenko 16'; Shevchenko 42'	Report		Stadium: RSC Lokomotyv; Attendance: 2,150; Referee: Anatoliy Aranovskyi

7 May 1992 13	Tavriya Simferopol	2–1	Metalurh Zaporizhzhia	Simferopol
?:? EEST (UTC+03:00)	Hudymenko 21', 79'; Shevchenko (yellow card) 54'	Report	Holovan 22'; Storchak (yellow card) 74'; Sorokalet (yellow card) 76'; Dudnyk (yellow card) 78'	Stadium: RSC Lokomotyv; Attendance: 3,200; Referee: Anatoliy Popov

19 May 1992 15	Chornomorets Odesa	0–0	Tavriya Simferopol	Odesa
?:? EEST (UTC+03:00)	Hetsko (red card) 86'	Report	Oleksandr Holovko (yellow card) 31'; Volkov (yellow card) 86'	Stadium: Central Stadium of Black Sea Shipping; Attendance: 9,500; Referee: Yaroslav Hrysyo

22 May 1992 16	Evis Mykolaiv	1–2	Tavriya Simferopol	Mykolaiv
?:? EEST (UTC+03:00)	Vysokos 72'	Report	Shevchenko 14'; Oparin 28'; Andreev (yellow card) 71'	Stadium: Central City Stadium; Attendance: 8,500; Referee: Leonid Bavykin

6 June 1992 17	Tavriya Simferopol	1–0	Karpaty Lviv	Simferopol
?:? EEST (UTC+03:00)	Andreev 33'	Report		Stadium: RSC Lokomotyv; Attendance: 3,500; Referee: Anatoliy Popov

9 June 1992 18	Tavriya Simferopol	6–0	Temp Shepetivka	Simferopol
?:? EEST (UTC+03:00)	Hudymenko 17', 33', 38', 62'; Gladyshev 32', 86'	Report		Stadium: RSC Lokomotyv; Attendance: 3,400; Referee: Serhiy Tatulyan

14 June 1992 19	Torpedo Zaporizhzhia	1–1	Tavriya Simferopol	Zaporizhzhia
?:? EEST (UTC+03:00)	Zayets 39' (pen.); Zaitsev (yellow card) 55'	Report	Turchynenko (yellow card) 23'; Shevchenko (yellow card) 30'; Voronezhskyi (yellow card) 55'; Hudymenko 78'	Stadium: AvtoZAZ Stadium; Attendance: 5,000; Referee: Valeriy Stoyan

17 June 1992 20	Shakhtar Donetsk	0–0	Tavriya Simferopol	Donetsk
?:? EEST (UTC+03:00)	Popov (yellow card) 63'	Report	Kolesov (yellow card) 20'; Volkov (yellow card) 84'	Stadium: Shakhtar Stadium; Attendance: 4,300; Referee: Ihor Khiblin

21 June 1992 Final	Tavriya Simferopol	1–0	Dynamo Kyiv	Lviv
?:? EEST (UTC+03:00)	Vyšniauskas (yellow card) 64'; Shevchenko 75'	Report		Stadium: Ukraina Stadium; Attendance: 36,000; Referee: Volodymyr Pianykh

=== Ukrainian Cup ===
16 February 1992 First preliminary (1/32)	Chayka Sevastopol	0–2	Tavriya Simferopol	Alushta
?:? EET (UTC+02:00)	Ihor Portnov (yellow card) 26'	Report	Shevchenko 32'; Volkov (yellow card) 33'; Novikov 55'	Stadium: Spartak Stadium; Attendance: 2,500; Referee: Oleksandr Dehtyaryov

23 February 1992 Second preliminary (1/16)	Naftovyk Okhtyrka	3–1	Tavriya Simferopol	Okhtyrka
?:? EET (UTC+02:00)	Yaichnyk 15', 42'; Denysenko 80'	Report	Shevchenko (penalty missed) 40'; Gladyshev 48'	Stadium: Naftovyk Stadium; Attendance: 2,000; Referee: Volodymyr Pianykh

=== Soviet Cup ===
At least three Ukrainian clubs qualified for the rounds that were conducted following the official dissolution of the Soviet Union. All of them withdrew the competition.

2 May 1991 First preliminary (1/64)	Nyva Vinnytsia	3–0	Tavriya Simferopol	Vinnytsia
?:? EEST (UTC+03:00)	Belichenko 23', 50' (pen.); Shariy 53' (pen.)	Report		Stadium: Central Stadium; Attendance: 4,500; Referee: Oleksandr Lytvynenko

== Statistics ==
=== Appearances and goals ===
No.	Pos	Nat	Player	Total		Premier League		Cup		Soviet Cup	
No.	Pos	Nat	Player	Apps	Goals	Apps	Goals	Apps	Goals	Apps	Goals
Goalkeepers
	GK	(Ukraine) UKR	Borys Beloshapka	1	0	0	0	0	0	1	0
	GK	(Ukraine) UKR	Andriy Tarakhtiy	1	0	0	0	0	0	0+1	0
10	GK	(Russia) RUS	Dmitri Gulenkov	1	0	1	0	0	0	0	0
12	GK	(Ukraine) UKR	Oleh Kolesov	21	0	19	0	2	0	0	0
Defenders
	DF	(Ukraine) UKR	Andriy Boryachynskyi	1	0	0	0	0	0	0+1	0
	DF	(Ukraine) UKR	Andriy Syncha	1	0	0	0	0	0	1	0
	DF	(Ukraine) UKR	Serhiy Sherabokov	1	0	0	0	0	0	1	0
1	DF	(Ukraine) UKR	Sefer Alibaev	10	0	9	0	0+1	0	0	0
3	DF	(Lithuania) LTU	Vidmantas Vyšniauskas	16	0	15	0	1	0	0	0
4	DF	(Ukraine) UKR	Ihor Volkov	20	1	17	1	2	0	1	0
5	DF	(Ukraine) UKR	Serhiy Voronezhskyi	10	0	7	0	2	0	1	0
6	DF	(Russia) RUS	Yuri Getikov	16	0	14	0	0+2	0	0	0
8	DF	(Ukraine) UKR	Oleksandr Holovko	21	0	18	0	2	0	1	0
16	DF	(Russia) RUS	Vladislav Novikov	20	2	18	1	2	1	0	0
18	DF	(Russia) RUS	Dmitri Smirnov	7	0	5	0	2	0	0	0
19	DF	(Ukraine) UKR	Mykola Turchynenko	20	0	19	0	1	0	0	0
Midfielders
	MF	(Ukraine) UKR	Pavlo Skoryk	1	0	0	0	0	0	1	0
	MF	(Ukraine) UKR	Oleksandr Yevtushok	1	0	0	0	0	0	1	0
	MF	(Ukraine) UKR	Ihor Yershov	1	0	0	0	0	0	1	0
	MF	(Ukraine) UKR	Oleksandr Tarabryn	1	0	0	0	0	0	1	0
	MF	(Ukraine) UKR	Andriy Nikiforov	1	0	0	0	0	0	1	0
11	MF	(Ukraine) UKR	Serhiy Yesin	2	0	1	0	0	0	1	0
13	MF	(Ukraine) UKR	Oleksandr Kundenok	3	0	2	0	0	0	1	0
14	MF	(Ukraine) UKR	Yuriy Mikhaylus	3	0	2	0	0	0	1	0
Forwards
	FW	(Ukraine) UKR	Vitaliy Yefimov	1	0	0	0	0	0	1	0
	FW	(Russia) RUS	Igor Ignatov	2	0	0	0	0+2	0	0	0
2	FW	(Uzbekistan) UZB	Sergey Andreyev	17	2	15	2	2	0	0	0
7	FW	(Russia) RUS	Sergei Gladyshev	21	7	19	6	2	1	0	0
9	FW	(Ukraine) UKR	Yuriy Hudymenko	20	13	18	12	2	1	0	0
15	FW	(Russia) RUS	Marat Mulashev	4	0	2	0	2	0	0	0
17	FW	(Ukraine) UKR	Andriy Oparin	21	1	19	1	2	0	0	0
20	FW	(Ukraine) UKR	Serhiy Shevchenko	20	9	18	8	2	1	0	0
21	FW	(Ukraine) UKR	Talyat Sheikhametov	9	1	7	0	2	1	0	0

Source: Competitions

Last updated:
