= 1994–95 Vyshcha Liha =

4th season of top-tier football league in Vyshcha Liha

Vyshcha Liha
- Season: 1994–95
- Champions: Dynamo Kyiv; 3rd title
- Relegated: Temp Shepetivka, Veres Rivne
- Champions League: Dynamo Kyiv
- Cup Winners' Cup: Shakhtar Donetsk
- UEFA Cup: Chornomorets Odesa
- Top goalscorer: (21) Arsen Avakov (Torpedo)

The 1994–95 Vyshcha Liha season was the 4th since its establishment. FC Dynamo Kyiv were the defending champions.

== Teams ==
=== Promotions ===
- Prykarpattia Ivano-Frankivsk, the champion of the 1993–94 Ukrainian First League – (returning after two seasons of absence)
- Evis Mykolaiv, the runner-up of the 1993–94 Ukrainian First League – (returning after two seasons of absence)

=== Renamed ===
- On 2 October 1994 Evis Mykolaiv changed its name to SC Mykolaiv.
- During the season, Metalurh Zaporizhzhia also carried the name Metalurh-Viktor Zaporizhzhia (after a local entrepreneur Viktor Oharenko).

=== Location ===
Locations of teams home grounds in Ukrainian Premier League 1994-95

== Managers ==
Club	Coach	Replaced Coach	Home stadium
FC Dynamo Kyiv	(Ukraine) Mykola Pavlov	(Ukraine) Yozhef Sabo 17 games (Ukraine) Volodymyr Onyschenko 5 games	Republican Stadium
FC Chornomorets Odesa	(Ukraine) Leonid Buriak		Black Sea Shipping Stadium
FC Dnipro Dnipropetrovsk	(Germany) Bernd Stange	(Ukraine) Mykola Pavlov 17 games (Ukraine) Oleksandr Lysenko 6 games	Meteor Stadium
FC Shakhtar Donetsk	(Russia) Vladimir Salkov	(Ukraine) Valery Yaremchenko 17 games	Shakhtar Stadium
SC Tavriya Simferopol	(Ukraine) Anatoliy Zayaev	(Ukraine) Pavlo Kostin 10 games (Ukraine) Andriy Cheremysin 7 games (Ukraine) Vitaliy Shalychev 10 games	Lokomotyv Stadium
FC Kryvbas Kryvyi Rih	(Ukraine) Yuriy Koval	(Azerbaijan) Volodymyr Brukhtiy 4 games (Ukraine) Anatoliy Bida 1 game (Ukraine) Viktor Kuznetsov 17 games (Ukraine) Valentyn Laktionov 3 games	Metalurh Stadium
FC Torpedo Zaporizhzhia	(Ukraine) Ihor Nadein		AvtoZAZ Stadium
FC Karpaty Lviv	(Ukraine) Myron Markevych		Ukraina Stadium
FC Metalurh Zaporizhzhia	(Ukraine) Oleksandr Tomakh	(Ukraine) Anatoliy Kuksov 7 games	Metalurh Stadium
FC Kremin Kremenchuk	(Ukraine) Tiberiy Korponay	(Ukraine) Evhen Rudakov 4 games	Dnipro Stadium
FC Prykarpattia Ivano-Frankivsk	(Ukraine) Ihor Yurchenko		Elektron Stadium
FC Nyva Ternopil	(Ukraine) Ihor Yavorskyi	(Ukraine) Valeriy Dushkov 11 games	City Stadium
SC Mykolaiv	(Ukraine) Yevhen Kucherevskyi	(Ukraine) Valery Zhuravko 10 games (Ukraine) Leonid Koltun 1 game	Central City Stadium
FC Nyva Vinnytsia	(Ukraine) Serhiy Morozov	(Ukraine) Oleksandr Bobaryko 22 games (Ukraine) Yuriy Koval 2 games	Central City Stadium
FC Volyn Lutsk	(Ukraine) Vitaliy Kvartsyanyi	(Ukraine) Roman Pokora 8 games	Avanhard Stadium
FC Zorya-MALS	(Ukraine) Oleksandr Zhuravliov	(Ukraine) Volodymyr Kobzarev 17 games (Ukraine) Yuriy Sevastyanov 3 games (Ukraine) Anatoliy Korshykov 3 games	Avanhard Stadium
FC Temp Shepetivka	(Georgia (country)) Revaz Dzodzuashvili	(Ukraine) Leonid Tkachenko 16 games (Ukraine) Stanislav Bernykov 8 games	Temp Stadium
FC Veres Rivne	(Ukraine) Mykhailo Fomenko	(Ukraine) Vyacheslav Kobyletskyi 16 games (Ukraine) Orest Bal 5 games (Ukraine) Ivan Krasnetskyi(7 games)	Avanhard Stadium

=== Changes ===
Team	Outgoing head coach	Manner of departure	Date of vacancy	Table	Incoming head coach	Date of appointment	Table
FC Chornomorets Odesa	(Ukraine) Viktor Prokopenko			pre-season	(Ukraine) Leonid Buriak		pre-season
FC Nyva Ternopil	(Ukraine) Leonid Buriak			pre-season	(Ukraine) Valeriy Dushkov		pre-season
FC Nyva Vinnytsia	(Ukraine) Yukhym Shkolnykov			pre-season	(Ukraine) Oleksandr Bobaryko		pre-season
FC Kremin Kremenchuk	(Ukraine) Yevhen Rudakov		July 1994		(Ukraine) Tiberiy Korponay	1 August 1994	
SC Tavriya Simferopol	(Ukraine) Pavlo Kostin	Perished in car accident	end of September		(Ukraine) Andriy Cheremysin (interim)	3 October 1994	
SC Tavriya Simferopol	(Ukraine) Andriy Cheremysin (interim)	Mutual consent	winter break		(Ukraine) Vitaliy Shalychev	February 1995	
SC Tavriya Simferopol	(Ukraine) Vitaliy Shalychev		May 1995		(Ukraine) Anatoliy Zayaev	May 1995	

Notes:

- The new 1994-95 season SC Tavriya Simferopol under leadership of a coach Pavlo Kostin (native of Chornomorske Raion, Crimea). Sometime after the game against Volyn (Round 10) on 23 September 1994 in Simferopol, Kostin (43 years old) perished in a car accident along with his wife. According to some sources (footballfacts.ru), Kostin perished on 15 September 1994.

== League table ==
Pos	Team	Pld	W	D	L	GF	GA	GD	Pts	Qualification or relegation
1	Dynamo Kyiv (C)	34	25	8	1	87	24	+63	83	Qualification to Champions League qualifying round
2	Chornomorets Odesa	34	22	7	5	62	29	+33	73	Qualification to UEFA Cup preliminary round
3	Dnipro Dnipropetrovsk (Note: Participant of the 1995 Ukrainian Cup Final.)	34	19	8	7	60	33	+27	65	
4	Shakhtar Donetsk	34	18	8	8	52	29	+23	62	Qualification to Cup Winners' Cup qualifying round
5	Tavriya Simferopol	34	17	8	9	61	37	+24	59	
6	Kryvbas Kryvyi Rih	34	13	9	12	35	30	+5	48	
7	Torpedo Zaporizhzhia	34	15	3	16	49	49	0	48	
8	Karpaty Lviv	34	12	9	13	32	36	−4	45	
9	Metalurh Zaporizhzhia	34	11	10	13	47	42	+5	43	
10	Kremin Kremenchuk	34	12	6	16	42	54	−12	42	
11	Prykarpattya Ivano-Frankivsk	34	11	8	15	40	52	−12	41	
12	Nyva Ternopil	34	11	5	18	40	44	−4	38	
13	SC Mykolaiv	34	11	5	18	33	59	−26	38	
14	Nyva Vinnytsia	34	10	7	17	38	51	−13	37	
15	Volyn Lutsk	34	11	3	20	29	58	−29	36	
16	Zorya-MALS Luhansk	34	10	5	19	35	70	−35	35	
17	Temp Shepetivka (R)	34	10	4	20	31	41	−10	34	Relegated to Ukrainian First League
18	Veres Rivne (R)	34	8	7	19	28	63	−35	31	Relegated to Ukrainian First League

Source: uafootball.net.ua
Rules for classification: 1st points; 2nd goal difference; 3rd goal scored
(C) Champions; (R) Relegated

== Results ==
Home \ Away	CHO	DNI	DYN	KAR	KRE	KRY	MZA	MYK	NVT	NYV	PRY	SHA	TAV	TEM	TZA	VER	VOL	ZOR
Chornomorets Odesa	—	2–0	1–1	2–1	3–0	5–2	2–1	3–0	1–0	2–1	2–1	1–1	4–0	3–2	3–0	2–0	4–0	1–1
Dnipro	0–2	—	2–2	2–1	3–0	2–1	1–1	3–1	3–2	1–0	1–1	2–0	0–0	2–0	2–3	4–2	3–1	6–0
Dynamo Kyiv	1–2	4–2	—	3–0	3–2	2–0	0–0	4–0	3–0	2–1	4–0	3–0	2–1	5–0	1–0	7–0	3–1	4–0
Karpaty Lviv	0–0	3–1	0–1	—	2–0	1–0	1–0	1–1	1–0	2–0	0–0	3–1	0–0	0–0	3–1	0–1	1–0	4–3
Kremin Kremenchuk	0–2	1–2	0–4	0–0	—	0–0	3–2	1–1	1–0	4–0	2–0	1–1	1–1	3–1	5–1	1–1	1–0	4–1
Kryvbas Kryvyi Rih	1–1	1–0	0–1	1–0	1–0	—	0–0	1–0	3–0	0–1	6–3	0–0	1–1	0–0	2–1	1–1	3–0	2–0
Metalurh Zaporizhzhia	3–1	0–0	2–2	1–0	2–1	0–2	—	4–1	0–0	4–0	0–0	1–5	0–2	2–0	4–0	1–0	1–0	5–0
SC Mykolaiv	1–0	1–1	2–5	1–1	0–1	0–1	3–2	—	2–1	0–1	2–0	1–6	4–2	1–0	2–1	1–0	1–0	2–1
Nyva Ternopil	0–2	0–2	1–1	2–1	5–0	0–2	1–6	2–0	—	1–0	3–0	2–0	2–0	0–0	1–0	3–0	3–0	3–1
Nyva Vinnytsia	2–2	0–2	1–3	1–1	0–1	1–0	3–0	0–0	0–0	—	2–0	1–1	1–3	1–0	2–0	2–0	3–0	3–1
Prykarpattya Ivano-Frankivsk	2–2	1–1	1–2	1–1	2–1	0–1	1–0	3–0	3–2	3–1	—	1–2	1–0	2–1	3–0	2–2	3–0	2–1
Shakhtar Donetsk	2–0	1–1	1–3	3–0	2–0	2–0	0–0	3–2	0–0	1–0	3–0	—	0–2	1–0	4–0	2–0	1–0	2–0
Tavriya Simferopol	2–0	1–2	0–0	3–0	3–1	1–0	3–3	3–1	3–2	3–1	2–1	1–2	—	3–1	3–1	7–0	6–0	1–1
Temp Shepetivka	0–1	0–1	0–1	0–2	1–2	2–0	4–0	3–0	1–0	2–1	3–0	1–0	0–1	—	0–1	1–1	3–0	2–1
Torpedo Zaporizhzhia	1–2	1–0	1–1	1–2	4–0	1–1	3–1	2–0	3–2	4–2	2–0	1–0	0–1	3–0	—	4–1	2–0	4–0
Veres Rivne	2–1	0–3	1–2	2–0	2–3	2–1	0–0	1–0	1–0	1–1	0–1	1–3	0–0	0–3	0–3	—	2–1	3–0
Volyn Lutsk	1–2	0–3	2–2	3–0	3–2	1–0	1–0	0–1	2–1	3–3	1–0	1–1	1–0	1–0	1–0	2–1	—	3–1
Zorya-MALS Luhansk	0–1	0–2	0–5	1–0	1–0	1–1	2–1	2–1	2–1	4–2	2–2	0–1	4–2	2–0	0–0	1–0	1–0	—

Source: uafootball.net.ua
Legend: Blue = home team win; Yellow = draw; Red = away team win.

== Top goalscorers ==
Rank	Player	Club	Goals (Pen.)
1	(Tajikistan) Arsen Avakov	Torpedo Zaporizhzhia	21 (6)
2	(Ukraine) Oleksiy Antyukhin	Tavriya Simferopol	18
3	(Ukraine) Oleksandr Haidash	Tavriya Simferopol	17
3	(Ukraine) Victor Leonenko	Dynamo Kyiv	17 (1)
5	(Ukraine) Ihor Petrov	Shakhtar Donetsk	14 (5)
6	(Georgia (country)) Mikhail Potskhveria	Zorya / Metalurh	13
7	(Ukraine) Timerlan Huseinov	Chornomorets Odesa	12
7	(Russia) Andrei Fedkov	Kremin Kremenchuk	12 (1)
9	(Ukraine) Ruslan Zabranskyi	Mykolaiv	11 (1)
10	(Ukraine) Ivan Korponay	Kremin Kremenchuk	10

== Medal squads ==
(league appearances and goals listed in brackets)

1. FC Dynamo Kyiv

Goalkeepers: Oleksandr Shovkovskyi (25 / -15), Valeriy Vorobiov (7 / -8), Andriy Kovtun (3 / -1).
Defenders: Vladyslav Vashchuk (31 / 3), Oleh Luzhnyi (24 / 4), Serhiy Lezhentsev (24), Andriy Khomyn (21 / 2), Yuriy Dmytrulin (17 / 1), Serhiy Shmatovalenko (14), Serhiy Bezhenar (13 / 1), Andriy Annenkov (3).
Midfielders: Vitaliy Kosovskyi (27 / 6), Dmytro Mykhailenko (25 / 5), Serhiy Mizin (20 / 5), Yevhen Pokhlebayev (17 / 3), Serhiy Kovalets (17 / 2), Yuriy Kalitvintsev (14 / 2), Yuriy Maksymov (11 / 5), Volodymyr Sharan (11 / 2), Dmytro Topchiyev (2), Maksim Demenko (1), Vladyslav Prudius (1).
Forwards: Serhii Rebrov (24 / 8), Pavlo Shkapenko (24 / 8), Viktor Leonenko (20 / 17), Serhiy Konovalov (17 / 5), Andriy Shevchenko (17 / 1), Serhiy Skachenko (16 / 3), Oleksandr Pryzetko (13 / 1), (Georgia (country)) Mikheil Jishkariani (8 / 3), (Kuwait) Naser al-Sohi (1).

Manager: Yozhef Sabo (first half), Volodymyr Onyshchenko, Mykola Pavlov (second half).

Transferred out during the season: Oleksandr Pryzetko (to (Russia) Dinamo-Gazovik), Maksim Demenko (to (Russia) Lada Togliatti), Serhiy Kovalets (to Dnipro Dnipropetrovsk), Volodymyr Sharan (to Dnipro Dnipropetrovsk), Mikheil Jishkariani (to CSKA-Borysfen), Valeriy Vorobiov (to CSKA-Borysfen), Dmytro Topchiyev (to CSKA-Borysfen), Vladyslav Prudius (to CSKA-Borysfen).

2. FC Chornomorets Odesa

Goalkeepers: Oleh Suslov (34 / -27), Vadym Vinokurov (2 / -2).
Defenders: Yuriy Bukel (29), Andriy Telesnenko (28 / 1), Vladislav Ternavsky (16 / 1), Yuriy Smotrych (10), Denys Kolchyn (8), Vitaliy Skysh (5), Oleksiy Cherednyk (3), Serhiy Bulyhin-Shramko (2).
Midfielders: Dmytro Parfyonov (33 / 6), Ihor Zhabchenko (32 / 7), Yuriy Sak (23 / 5), Vitaliy Kolesnychenko (21 / 2), (Russia) Andrei Gashkin (20 / 5), Oleksandr Spivak (19), Oleksandr Horshkov (18), Ihor Korniyets (16 / 1), Yuriy Seleznyov (13 / 2), Ruslan Romanchuk (12 / 2), Oleksandr Nikiforov (9), Oleksandr Zotov (8 / 3), Vyacheslav Yeremeyev (7), Viktor Yablonskyi (5 / 1), Vladyslav Zubkov (4), Viktor Bohatyr (3).
Forwards: Tymerlan Huseinov (29 / 12), Volodymyr Musolitin (19 / 3), Vitaliy Parakhnevych (13 / 4), Vasyl Kardash (13 / 2), Oleh Mochulyak (8 / 2), Kostyantyn Kulyk (5 / 2).

Manager: Leonid Buriak.

Transferred out during the season: ?.

3. FC Dnipro Dnipropetrovsk

Goalkeepers: Mykola Medin (19 / -13), Svyatoslav Syrota (16 / -17), (Kazakhstan) Konstantin Ledovskikh (1 / -3).
Defenders: Viktor Skrypnyk (31 / 8), Volodymyr Bahmut (30 / 1), Volodymyr Horily (25), Serhiy Diryavka (19), Serhiy Bezhenar (17 / 3), Dmytro Yakovenko (17), Oleksandr Chervonyi (7), Hennadiy Kozar (7), Yevhen Dmitriyev (6), Andriy Yudin (6), Oleksiy Kuptsov (3), Albert Shakhov (2), Serhiy Bilokin (1), Serhiy Zadorozhnyi (1).
Midfielders: Andriy Polunin (31 / 7), (Russia) Aleksandr Zakharov (25 / 1), Valentyn Moskvyn (17 / 2), Serhiy Kovalets (15 / 3), Dmytro Topchiyev (15 / 3), Yevhen Pokhlebayev (15 / 2), Ihor Plotko (15 / 1), Volodymyr Sharan (14 / 2), Yuriy Maksymov (13 / 4), Serhiy Dumenko (9 / 1), Serhiy Chornyi (3).
Forwards: Borys Finkel (29 / 9), Serhiy Konovalov (17 / 3), Oleksandr Palyanytsia (13 / 6), Oleh Taran (7 / 1), Andriy Kotyuk (6), (Germany) Andreas Sassen (6), Serhiy Chuichenko (4).

Manager: Mykola Pavlov (first half), Oleksandr Lysenko, Bernd Stange (second half).

Transferred out during the season: Serhiy Bezhenar (to Dynamo Kyiv), Serhiy Konovalov (to Dynamo Kyiv), Yevhen Pokhlebayev (to Dynamo Kyiv), Yuriy Maksymov (to Dynamo Kyiv).

Note: Players in italic are whose playing position is uncertain.
