= 1994 Ukrainian Cup final =

- Event: Ukrainian Cup 1993-94
Chornomorets Odesa	Tavriya Simferopol
0	0
- Chornomorets Odesa won 5–3 on penalties
- Date: 29 May 1994
- Venue: Republican Stadium, Kyiv
- Referee: Serhiy Tatulian (Kyiv)
- Attendance: 5,000
- Weather: 17 °C

The 1994 Ukrainian Cup final was a football match that took place at the Republican Stadium on 29 May 1994. The match was the 3rd Ukrainian Cup Final and it was contested by FC Chornomorets Odesa and SC Tavriya Simferopol. The 1994 Ukrainian Cup Final was the third to be held in the Ukrainian capital Kyiv. Chornomorets won on penalty kicks 5–3 after the score was tied 0–0.

== Road to Kyiv ==
Both teams started from the first round of the competition (Round of 16). Unlike Chornomorets who met almost no resistance up to the final, defeating Dnipro at its home ground 3:0 along the way; Tavriya had a little bit of trouble when it traveled to Western parts of Ukraine. The Crimeans almost yielded to Skala Stryi in the first round of the competition pulling an extra-time win in Simferopol. Tavriya also managed to defeat Veres followed, surprisingly, by knocking Dynamo out of the competition. The most effort the Odesans needed was against the Carpathian Lions managing to pull a home win in the last minutes of playing time while being tied at one all.

Chornomorets

Round 1 (1st leg)	Voykovets	0–2	Chornomorets
Round 1 (2nd leg)	Chornomorets	2–0	Voykovets
	(Chornomorets won 4–0 on aggregate)		
Round 2 (1st leg)	Metalurh	0–1	Chornomorets
Round 2 (2nd leg)	Chornomorets	3–0	Metalurh
	(Chornomorets won 4–0 on aggregate)		
Quarter-final (1st leg)	Dnipro	0–3	Chornomorets
Quarter-final (2nd leg)	Chornomorets	1–0	Dnipro
	(Chornomorets won 4–0 on aggregate)		
Semi-final (1st leg)	Karpaty	0–0	Chornomorets
Semi-final (2nd leg)	Chornomorets	2–1	Karpaty
	(Chornomorets won 2–1 on aggregate)		

Tavriya Simferopol

Round 1 (1st leg)	Skala	2–0	Tavriya
Round 1 (2nd leg)	Tavriya	3–0 aet	Skala
	(Tavriya won 3–2 on aggregate)		
Round 2 (1st leg)	Nyva T.	0–0	Tavriya
Round 2 (2nd leg)	Tavriya	3–0	Nyva T.
	(Tavriya won 3–0 on aggregate)		
Quarter-final (1st leg)	Tavriya	3–0	Kremin
Quarter-final (2nd leg)	Kremin	1–3	Tavriya
	(Tavriya won 6–1 on aggregate)		
Semi-final (1st leg)	Tavriya	2–0	Veres
Semi-final (2nd leg)	Veres	0–0	Tavriya
	(Tavriya won 2–0 on aggregate)		

== Match details ==
29 May 1994
17:00 LST

Chornomorets Odesa	0 – 0 (a.e.t.)	Tavriya Simferopol
	Report
Penalties
Parfenov (penalty scored); Kulyk (penalty scored); Korniyets (penalty scored); Telesnenko (penalty scored); Suslov (penalty scored)	5 – 3	(penalty scored) Antiukhin; (penalty missed) Fursov; (penalty scored) Volkov; (penalty scored) Oparin

Republican Stadium, Kyiv
Attendance: 5,000
Referee: Serhiy Tatulian (Kyiv), (FIFA)

Chornomorets Odesa	Tavriya Simferopol

Chornomorets Odesa:
GK	?	(Ukraine) Oleh Suslov
MF	?	(Ukraine) Serhiy Bulyhin-Shramko
DF	?	(Ukraine) Kostyantyn Kulyk
DF	?	(Ukraine) Yuriy Smotrych
DF	?	(Ukraine) Ihor Zhabchenko	(substituted off) 73'
MF	?	(Ukraine) Dmytro Parfenov
DF	?	(Ukraine) Ihor Korniyets
DF	?	(Ukraine) Timerlan Huseinov
MF	?	(Ukraine) Vyacheslav Yeremeyev
FW	?	(Ukraine) Viktor Bohatyr	(substituted off) 34'
FW	?	(Ukraine) Andriy Telesnenko (c)
Substitutes:
DF	?	(Ukraine) Viktor Yablonskyi	(substituted on) 73'
MF	?	(Ukraine) Vitaliy Parakhnevych	(substituted on) 34'
Manager:
(Ukraine) Viktor Prokopenko

Tavriya Simferopol:
GK	?	(Ukraine) Maksym Levytsky
DF	?	(Ukraine) Dmytro Demyanenko
MF	?	(Ukraine) Serhiy Yesin
MF	?	(Ukraine) Oleksandr Holovko
MF	?	(Ukraine) Ihor Volkov (c)
FW	?	(Ukraine) Oleksandr Kundyenok
DF	?	(Ukraine) Andriy Oparin
DF	?	(Ukraine) Volodymyr Fursov
MF	?	(Ukraine) Tolyat Sheikhametov	(substituted off) 63'
FW	?	(Ukraine) Oleksiy Antiukhin
DF	?	(Ukraine) Sefer Alibayev
Substitutes:
DF	?	(Ukraine) Hennadiy Dziubenko	(substituted on) 63'	(substituted off) 115'
FW	?	(Ukraine) Oleksandr Shemetiev	(substituted on) 115'
Manager:
(Ukraine) Anatoliy Zayaev

MATCH OFFICIALS

- Assistant referees:
  - Anatoliy Aranovskyi (Kyiv)
  - Oleksandr Tiutiun (Fastiv)
- Fourth official: Ihor Yaremchuk (Kyiv)

MATCH RULES

- 90 minutes.
- 30 minutes of extra-time if necessary.
- Penalty shoot-out if scores still level.
- Seven named substitutes
- Maximum of 3 substitutions.

== Match statistics ==
	Chornomorets	Tavriya
Total shots	?	?
Shots on target	?	?
Ball possession	?%	?%
Corner kicks	?	?
Fouls committed	?	?
Offsides	?	?
Yellow cards	?	?
Red cards	?	?

== See also ==
- Ukrainian Cup 1993-94
