= 1978 in Soviet football =

Football in the Soviet Union
- Season: 1978

Men's football
- Top League: Dinamo Tbilisi
- First League: Krylia Sovetov Kuibyshev
- Second League: Fakel Voronezh (Group 1); Metallist Kharkov (Group 2); Spartak Nalchik (Group 3); Zvezda Perm (Group 4); Alga Frunze (Group 5); Traktor Pavlodar (Group 6)
- Soviet Cup: Dinamo Kiev

The 1978 Soviet football championship was the 47th seasons of competitive football in the Soviet Union, the 41st among teams of masters. Dinamo Tbilisi won the Top League championship becoming the Soviet domestic champions for the second time.

== Honours ==
Competition		Winner	Runner-up
Top League		Dinamo Tbilisi (2)	Dinamo Kiev
First League		Krylia Sovetov Kuibyshev (5*)	SKA Rostov-na-Donu
Second League	Group 1	Fakel Voronezh	Iskra Smolensk
Second League	Group 2	Metallist Kharkov	Kolos Nikopol
Second League	Group 3	Spartak Nalchik	Mashuk Piatigorsk
Second League	Group 4	Zvezda Perm	Guria Lanchkhuti
Second League	Group 5	Alga Frunze	Avtomobilist Termez
Second League	Group 6	Traktor Pavlodar	Shakhter Karaganda
Soviet Cup		Dinamo Kiev (5)	Shakhter Donetsk

Notes = Number in parentheses is the times that club has won that honour. * indicates new record for competition

== Soviet Union football championship ==
=== Top League ===
Pos	Team	Pld	W	D	L	GF	GA	GD	Pts	Qualification or relegation
1	(Georgian Soviet Socialist Republic) Dinamo Tbilisi (C)	30	17	8	5	45	24	+21	42	Qualification for European Cup first round
2	(Ukrainian Soviet Socialist Republic) Dynamo Kyiv	30	15	9	6	42	20	+22	38 (Note: 1 point deducted (8 draw limit).)	Qualification for UEFA Cup first round
3	(Ukrainian Soviet Socialist Republic) Shakhtar Donetsk	30	16	5	9	42	31	+11	37	Qualification for UEFA Cup first round
4	(Russian Soviet Federative Socialist Republic) Dynamo Moscow	30	14	10	6	37	23	+14	36 (Note: 2 points deducted (8 draw limit).)	Qualification for Cup Winners' Cup first round
5	(Russian Soviet Federative Socialist Republic) Spartak Moscow	30	14	5	11	42	33	+9	33	
6	(Russian Soviet Federative Socialist Republic) CSKA Moscow	30	14	4	12	36	40	−4	32	
7	(Ukrainian Soviet Socialist Republic) Chornomorets Odessa	30	12	10	8	41	26	+15	32	
8	(Russian Soviet Federative Socialist Republic) Torpedo Moscow	30	11	11	8	36	29	+7	30 (Note: 3 points deducted (8 draw limit).)	
9	(Ukrainian Soviet Socialist Republic) Zaria Voroshilovgrad	30	9	8	13	38	44	−6	26	
10	(Russian Soviet Federative Socialist Republic) Zenit Leningrad	30	9	8	13	31	46	−15	26	
11	(Uzbek Soviet Socialist Republic) Pakhtakor Tashkent	30	9	8	13	42	43	−1	26	
12	(Kazakh Soviet Socialist Republic) Kairat Alma-Ata	30	9	7	14	29	41	−12	25	
13	(Azerbaijan Soviet Socialist Republic) Neftchi Baku	30	8	7	15	28	39	−11	23	
14	(Armenian Soviet Socialist Republic) Ararat Yerevan	30	8	6	16	20	42	−22	22	
15	(Russian Soviet Federative Socialist Republic) Lokomotiv Moscow	30	7	9	14	26	40	−14	22	
16	(Ukrainian Soviet Socialist Republic) Dnipro Dnipropetrovsk (R)	30	9	3	18	25	39	−14	21	Relegation to First League

(C) Champions; (R) Relegated

=== First League ===
Pos	Rep	Team	Pld	W	D	L	GF	GA	GD	Pts	Promotion
1	RUS	Krylya Sovetov Kuibyshev	38	21	14	3	59	25	+34	56	Promoted
2	RUS	SKA Rostov-na-Donu	38	20	14	4	64	35	+29	54	Promoted
3	BLR	Dinamo Minsk	38	21	11	6	57	28	+29	53	Promoted
4	UKR	Karpaty Lvov	38	21	10	7	60	37	+23	52	
5	RUS	Terek Grozny	38	16	9	13	56	56	0	41	
6	RUS	Kuban Krasnodar	38	16	9	13	51	46	+5	41	
7	LTU	Žalgiris Vilnius	38	11	19	8	38	37	+1	41	
8	UKR	Tavria Simferopol	38	14	12	12	48	38	+10	40	
9	GEO	Torpedo Kutaisi	38	14	9	15	44	41	+3	37	
10	MDA	Nistru Kishinev	38	13	11	14	42	40	+2	37	
11	UKR	SKA Odessa	38	12	10	16	43	51	−8	34	
12	RUS	Shinnik Yaroslavl	38	12	10	16	37	42	−5	34	
13	TJK	Pamir Dushanbe	38	10	14	14	47	41	+6	34	
14	UKR	Metallurg Zaporozhye	38	10	14	14	39	47	−8	34	
15	UKR	Spartak Ivano-Frankovsk	38	13	6	19	43	58	−15	32	
16	RUS	Kuzbass Kemerovo	38	12	7	19	38	54	−16	31	
17	RUS	UralMash Sverdlovsk	38	10	11	17	31	50	−19	31	
18	RUS	Spartak Orjonikidze	38	10	8	20	30	50	−20	28	
19	RUS	Dinamo Leningrad	38	7	13	18	47	65	−18	27	
20	TKM	Kolhozchi Ashkhabad	38	7	9	22	27	60	−33	23	

Source: rsssf.com

=== Second League (playoffs) ===
[Nov 10, Nov 15]
Metallist Kharkov      1-0 0-1  Fakel Voronezh     (5–3 p)
Traktor Pavlodar       0-1 0-2  Zvezda Perm 
Spartak Nalchik        2-0 0-1  Alga Frunze

=== Top goalscorers ===
Top League

- Georgiy Yartsev (Spartak Moscow) – 19 goals

First League

- Sergei Andreyev (SKA Rostov-na-Donu), Aleksandr Ploshnik (Kuban Krasnodar) – 20 goals
