= Yurchenko =

Yurchenko is a Ukrainian patronymic surname that comes from the name Yuriy (George). Less common spellings include Iurchenko, Jurčenko, Jurczenko, Jurtschenko and Yourtchenko.

Notable people with the surname include:

- David Yurchenko (born 1986), Russian-Armenian footballer
- Denys Yurchenko (born 1978), Ukrainian pole vaulter
- Ihor Yurchenko (born 1960), Soviet and Ukrainian footballer
- Henrietta Yurchenko (1916–2007), American ethnomusicologist, folklorist, radio producer, and radio host
- Kateryna Yurchenko (born 1976), Ukrainian sprint canoer
- Mikhail Yurchenko (born 1970), Kazakhstani boxer
- Mykola Yurchenko (born 1966), Ukrainian footballer
- Natalia Yurchenko (born 1965), Soviet artistic gymnast
  - Yurchenko (vault), a vault routine in artistic gymnastics
  - Yurchenko loop, a balance beam skill in artistic gymnastics
- Tatyana Yurchenko (born 1993), Kazakhstani middle-distance runner
- Vasyl Yurchenko (born 1950), Soviet sprint canoer
- Vitaly Yurchenko (born 1936), KGB officer
- Vladimir Yurchenko (born 1989), Belarusian footballer
- Vladlen Yurchenko, (born 1994), Ukrainian footballer
