= Igor Volkov =

Igor Volkov may also refer to:

- Igor F. Volkov, Russian soloist
- Igor Volkov (ice hockey) (born 1983), Russian ice hockey player
- Igor Volkov (Uzbekistani footballer) (born 1971), Uzbekistani football player
- Igor Volkov (footballer, born 1965), Ukrainian football manager and footballer
