= 1972 Soviet Second League, Zone 1 =

Football Championship of Ukrainian SSR
- Season: 1972
- Champions: Spartak Ivano-Frankivsk
- Promoted: Spartak Ivano-Frankivsk
- Relegated: Mayak Kharkiv
- Top goalscorer: 24 – Viktor Baihuzov (Shakhtar Kadiivka)

The 1972 Football Championship of Ukrainian SSR was the 42nd season of association football competition of the Ukrainian SSR, which was part of the Soviet Second League in Zone 1. The season started on 6 April 1972.

The 1972 Football Championship of Ukrainian SSR was won by FC Spartak Ivano-Frankivsk.

== Teams ==
=== Location map ===
Locations of teams in Second League, Zone 6

=== Relegated teams ===
- none

=== Promoted teams ===
- FC Shakhtar Makiivka – (debut)
- FC Mayak Kharkiv – (debut)

=== Relocated and renamed teams ===
- SKA Odessa was moved away from the Ukrainian championship, relocated to Tiraspol, Moldavian SSR and changed its name to FC Zvezda Tiraspol (competed in Zone 3).
- SKA Kiev was relocated to Chernihiv and changed its name to SC Chernihiv.
- SKA Lvov was relocated to Lutsk (in place of the relegated Torpedo Lutsk) and changed its name to SC Lutsk.

== Final standings ==
Pos	Team	Pld	W	D	L	GF	GA	GD	Pts	Promotion or relegation
1	Spartak Ivano-Frankivsk (C, P)	46	23	17	6	51	28	+23	63	Promoted
2	Hoverla Uzhhorod	46	25	8	13	70	44	+26	58	
3	Tavriya Simferopol	46	25	7	14	62	32	+30	57	
4	Sudnobudivnyk Mykolaiv	46	20	17	9	48	25	+23	57	
5	Shakhtar Kadiivka	46	22	11	13	61	35	+26	55	
6	Dynamo Khmelnytskyi	46	18	18	10	56	39	+17	54	
7	Lokomotyv Vinnytsia	46	19	16	11	49	36	+13	54	
8	Avtomobilist Zhytomyr	46	19	15	12	44	31	+13	53	
9	Metalurh Zhdanov	46	20	13	13	56	45	+11	53	
10	SC Chernihiv	46	19	14	13	56	41	+15	52	
11	Kolos Poltava	46	17	17	12	44	45	−1	51	
12	Shakhtar Makiivka	46	16	18	12	47	40	+7	50	
13	Avanhard Sevastopol	46	15	17	14	33	31	+2	47	
14	Zirka Kirovohrad	46	13	18	15	40	51	−11	44	
15	Budivelnyk Ternopil	46	14	15	17	50	55	−5	43	
16	Khimik Severodonetsk	46	15	13	18	37	49	−12	43	
17	Shakhtar Horlivka	46	9	22	15	43	44	−1	40	
18	Avanhard Rovno	46	13	14	19	41	52	−11	40	
19	Frunzenets Sumy	46	16	8	22	36	51	−15	40	
20	Lokomotyv Kherson	46	15	7	24	55	82	−27	37	
21	Bukovyna Chernivtsi	46	10	16	20	32	62	−30	36	
22	SC Lutsk	46	8	17	21	30	52	−22	33	
23	Lokomotyv Donetsk	46	8	13	25	32	71	−39	29	
24	Mayak Kharkiv	46	2	11	33	15	47	−32	15	Relegated

(C) Champions; (P) Promoted

== Top goalscorers ==
The following were the top goalscorers.

#	Scorer	Goals (Pen.)	Team
1	Viktor Baihuzov	24	Shakhtar Kadiivka
2	Mykola Rusyn	21	Hoverla Uzhhorod
3	Anatoliy Lebid	19	Lokomotyv Kherson
4	Volodymyr Dzyuba	17	Lokomotyv Vinnytsia
5	Yuriy Nesmiyan	16	Avtomobilist Zhytomyr
5	Viktor Polokhov	16	Metalurh Zhdanov
7	Andriy Cheremysin	15	Tavriya Simferopol
7	Valentyn Prylepskyi	15	Tavriya Simferopol
7	Volodymyr Fursov	15	Shakhtar Kadiivka
10	Yevhen Biloborodov	14	Frunzenets Sumy

== See also ==
- Soviet Second League
