= Vadym Deonas =

Ukrainian footballer (born 1975)

Personal information
- Full name: Vadym Volodimirovich Deonas
- Date of birth: 25 July 1975 (age 51)
- Place of birth: Odesa, Ukrainian SSR, Soviet Union
- Height: 1.85 m (6 ft 1 in)
- Position: Goalkeeper

Team information
- Current team: FC Lviv (GK coach)

Senior career*
Years	Team	Apps	(Gls)
1993–1995	Chornomorets Odesa	2	(0)
1993–1994	→ Chornomorets-2 Odesa	38	(0)
1995	Prykarpattya Ivano-Frankivsk	3	(0)
1996	Mykolaiv	11	(0)
1996–1997	Chornomorets Odesa	5	(0)
1997	CSKA-2 Kyiv	9	(0)
1998	CSKA Kyiv	0	(0)
1998	Chornomorets Odesa	11	(0)
1999	Arsenal Tula	9	(0)
2000	Kristall Smolensk	10	(0)
2001	Metallurg Lipetsk	2	(0)
2002	Torpedo-ZIL Moscow	0	(0)
2003	Atyrau	31	(0)
2004	Stal Dniprodzerzhynsk	26	(0)
2005	Borysfen Boryspil	13	(0)
2005	Tavriya Simferopol	6	(0)
2006–2009	Arsenal Kyiv	42	(0)
2009–2010	Tavriya Simferopol	5	(0)
2010–2011	Illichivets Mariupol	0	(0)
2011	Dynamo Brest	16	(0)
2012	Oleksandriya	0	(0)
Total		239	(0)

Managerial career
- 2013–2015: Karpaty Lviv (goalies coach)
- 2016–2017: Stal Kamianske (goalies coach)
- 2018–2019: Volyn Lutsk (goalies coach)
- 2020–: Lviv (goalies coach)
- * Club domestic league appearances and goals

Vadym Deonas formerly known as Vadym Vinokurov (Ukrainian: Вадим Деонас; born 25 July 1975, Ukrainian SSR, Soviet Union) is a Ukrainian former professional footballer who played as a goalkeeper.
