= 1970 Soviet Second Group (Class A), Zone 1 =

Football Championship of Ukrainian SSR
- Season: 1970
- Champions: Metalurh Zaporizhia
- Promoted: Metalurh Zaporizhia
- Relegated: Desna Chernihiv (dissolved), Spartak Brest, Neman Grodno, Gomselmash Gomel, Baltika Kaliningrad (all four were moved to other Zone)
- Top goalscorer: 20 – Valentyn Prylepskyi (Tavriya)

The 1970 Football Championship of Ukrainian SSR was the 40th season of association football competition of the Ukrainian SSR, which was part of the Second Group of Soviet Class A in Zone 1. It was the eighth and last season in the Second Group of Soviet Class A.

The season started on 11 April 1970.

The 1970 Football Championship of Ukrainian SSR was won by FC Metalurh Zaporizhia.

== Reorganization ==
In 1970–1971 the Soviet football league structure went through reformation. The Soviet Class A introduced an extra tier expanding from two to three in total. To the previous First and Second groups, there was introduced Higher (or Top) group. With this, many clubs that previously competed at the second tier (Second Group) were relegated to lower third tier (Second Group). Because of that, many clubs also moved two tiers either up the league's ladder.

== Teams ==
=== Location map ===
Locations of teams in Second Group (Class A), Zone 1
Locations of teams in Second Group (Class A), Zone 1
Locations of teams in Second Group (Class A), Zone 1

=== Relegated teams ===
18 clubs were relegated from the 1969 Second Group (Class A).

- FC Metalurh Zaporizhia
- SC Tavriya Simferopol
- FC Avtomobilist Zhytomyr
- FC Sudnobudivnyk Mykolaiv
- FC Azovets Zhdanov
- FC Zirka Kirovohrad
- FC Bukovyna Chernivtsi
- FC Lokomotyv Kherson
- FC Desna Chernihiv
- FC Shakhtar Horlivka
- FC Budivelnyk Poltava
- SKA Lviv
- FC Kryvbas Kryvyi Rih
- FC Spartak Brest
- FC Avanhard Ternopil
- FC Neman Grodno
- FC Baltika Kaliningrad
- SKA Odessa

=== Promoted teams ===
All four teams technically were never promoted as they stayed at the third tier. Three clubs were moved from the 1969 Ukrainian Class B, one more from the 1969 Russian Class B, Zone 1.

- FC Spartak Ivano-Frankivsk
- FC Shakhtar Kadiivka
- FC Spartak Sumy
- FC Gomselmash Gomel

=== Relocated and renamed teams ===
- none

== Final standings ==
Pos	Team	Pld	W	D	L	GF	GA	GD	Pts	Promotion or relegation
1	(Ukrainian Soviet Socialist Republic) Metalurh Zaporizhia (C, P)	42	26	10	6	73	33	+40	62	Promoted
2	(Ukrainian Soviet Socialist Republic) Tavriya Simferopol	42	21	15	6	70	36	+34	57	
3	(Ukrainian Soviet Socialist Republic) Avtomobilist Zhytomyr	42	20	15	7	61	27	+34	55	
4	(Ukrainian Soviet Socialist Republic) Spartak Ivano-Frankivsk	42	18	14	10	58	53	+5	50	
5	(Ukrainian Soviet Socialist Republic) Sudnobudivnyk Mykolaiv	42	17	14	11	47	36	+11	48	
6	(Ukrainian Soviet Socialist Republic) Azovets Zhdanov	42	15	18	9	44	34	+10	48	
7	(Ukrainian Soviet Socialist Republic) Zirka Kirovohrad	42	19	9	14	48	41	+7	47	
8	(Ukrainian Soviet Socialist Republic) Bukovyna Chernivtsi	42	17	12	13	45	39	+6	46	
9	(Ukrainian Soviet Socialist Republic) Shakhtar Kadiivka	42	16	13	13	49	37	+12	45	
10	(Ukrainian Soviet Socialist Republic) Lokomotyv Kherson	42	16	12	14	60	50	+10	44	
11	(Ukrainian Soviet Socialist Republic) Desna Chernihiv	42	17	10	15	43	45	−2	44	Dissolved
12	(Ukrainian Soviet Socialist Republic) Shakhtar Horlivka	42	14	13	15	42	47	−5	41	
13	(Ukrainian Soviet Socialist Republic) Budivelnyk Poltava	42	13	13	16	33	34	−1	39	
14	(Ukrainian Soviet Socialist Republic) SKA Lviv	42	12	15	15	30	41	−11	39	
15	(Ukrainian Soviet Socialist Republic) Kryvbas Kryvyi Rih	42	12	14	16	52	48	+4	38	
16	(Byelorussian Soviet Socialist Republic) Spartak Brest	42	12	13	17	32	48	−16	37	
17	(Ukrainian Soviet Socialist Republic) Avanhard Ternopil	42	12	12	18	38	47	−9	36	
18	(Byelorussian Soviet Socialist Republic) Neman Grodno	42	11	13	18	27	48	−21	35	
19	(Russian Soviet Federative Socialist Republic) Baltika Kaliningrad	42	10	11	21	24	51	−27	31	
20	(Ukrainian Soviet Socialist Republic) SKA Odessa	42	12	6	24	34	56	−22	30	
21	(Ukrainian Soviet Socialist Republic) Spartak Sumy	42	7	14	21	31	57	−26	28	
22	(Byelorussian Soviet Socialist Republic) Gomselmash Gomel	42	7	10	25	22	55	−33	24	

(C) Champions; (P) Promoted

== Top goalscorers ==
The following were the top goalscorers.

#	Scorer	Goals (Pen.)	Team
1	Valentyn Prylepskyi	20	Tavriya Simferopol
2	Viktor Kutin	19	Metalurh Zaporizhia
2	Anatoliy Lebid	19	Lokomotyv Kherson
4	Yuriy Nesmiyan	17	Polissya Zhytomyr
5	Volodymyr Bystrov	15	Tavriya Simferopol
5	Roman Shpondarunok	15	Avanhard Ternopil
7	Vyacheslav Portnov	13	Metalurh Zaporizhia
7	Viktor Kozyn	13	Spartak Ivano-Frankivsk
7	Stepan Chopei	13	Spartak Ivano-Frankivsk
7	Roman Khyzhak	13	SKA Lviv
7	Volodymyr Tovchykh	13	Kryvbas Kryvyi Rih

== See also ==
- Soviet Second League
