= Sergey Andreyev (footballer, born 1970) =

Uzbekistani footballer and coach

Personal information
- Full name: Sergey Nikolay o‘g‘il Andreyev
- Date of birth: 14 September 1970 (age 56)
- Height: 1.82 m (5 ft 11 1/2 in)
- Position: Forward

Senior career*
Years	Team	Apps	(Gls)
1987	Pakhtakor Tashkent FK	1	(0)
1988	FC SKA-RShVSM Tashkent Oblast		
1989	FC SKA-RShVSM Angren		
1990	FC Shakhtyor Angren	18	(11)
1990	Pakhtakor Tashkent FK	6	(0)
1991	Navbahor Namangan	39	(11)
1992–1993	Tavriya Simferopol	27	(2)
1993–1994	FSV Wacker 90 Nordhausen	8	(1)
1994–1996	Neftchi FK	61	(22)
1997	Navbahor Namangan	17	(8)
1998	FC Nasaf	11	(2)
1998	FC Krylia Sovetov Samara	3	(0)
1999–2000	FC Dustlik		
2000	FC Volgar-Gazprom Astrakhan	12	(0)
2001	FC Metallurg-Zapsib Novokuznetsk	23	(4)
2002	FC Zvezda Irkutsk	19	(1)
2002–2003	Dempo		(2)
2003	Navbahor Namangan	6	(3)
2003	Neftchi FK	11	(2)

International career
1996–1997	Uzbekistan	2	(1)

Managerial career
- 2006–?: Lokomotiv Tashkent FK (assistant)
- * Club domestic league appearances and goals

Sergey Nikolay o‘g‘il Andreyev (Russian: Сергей Николаевич Андреев; born 14 September 1970) is an Uzbek football coach and former footballer.

He has appeared with Indian NFL club Dempo in 2002–03.

== Honours ==
Tavriya Simferopol

- Ukrainian Premier League: 1992

Neftchi

- Uzbek League: 1995
- Uzbekistan Cup: 1996
