= Dmitri Smirnov (footballer, born 1969) =

Russian footballer

Personal information
- Full name: Dmitri Aleksandrovich Smirnov
- Date of birth: 14 August 1969 (age 57)
- Height: 1.74 m (5 ft 8 1/2 in)
- Positions: Defender; midfielder

Youth career
- –1985: SK Podshipnik Moscow
- 1985–1987: FC Dynamo Moscow

Senior career*
Years	Team	Apps	(Gls)
1987	FC Dynamo Moscow	0	(0)
1988	FC Dynamo-2 Moscow	29	(3)
1988	FC Lokomotiv Moscow	0	(0)
1989–1990	FC Dynamo-2 Moscow	47	(3)
1991	FK Pardaugava	35	(3)
1992	Tavriya Simferopol	5	(0)
1992–1993	FC Shinnik Yaroslavl	19	(1)
1993	FC Vympel Rybinsk	7	(0)
1994–1997	FC MChS-Selyatino Selyatino	111	(17)
1997–1998	Kapaz PFK	24	(1)
1998	FC Krasnoznamensk-Selyatino Krasnoznamensk	0	(0)
1999	FC Saturn Ramenskoye	0	(0)
1999	→ FC Saturn-d Ramenskoye (loan)	33	(5)
2000	FC Vityaz Podolsk (amateur)		
- * Club domestic league appearances and goals

Dmitri Aleksandrovich Smirnov (Russian: Дмитрий Александрович Смирнов; born 14 August 1969) is a former Russian football player.

== Honours ==
Tavriya Simferopol

- Ukrainian Premier League champion: 1992

Kapaz PFK

- Azerbaijan Premier League champion: 1997–1998
