= Oleh Suslov =

Ukrainian footballer

Personal information
- Full name: Oleh Anatoliovych Suslov
- Date of birth: 2 January 1969 (age 57)
- Place of birth: Kadiivka, Luhansk Oblast, Ukrainian SSR, Soviet Union
- Height: 1.88 m (6 ft 2 in)
- Position: Goalkeeper

Senior career*
| Years | Team | Apps | (Gls) |
| 1986–1988 | Zorya Luhansk | 21 | (0) |
| 1988–1990 | SCA Odesa | 83 | (0) |
| 1991–1997 | Chornomorets Odesa | 174 | (2) |
| 1997–1999 | Casino/Austria Salzburg | 15 | (0) |
| 1999–2000 | Sankt-Poelten | 37 | (0) |
| 2000–2002 | Admira-Wacker | 6 | (0) |
| Total | | 336 | (2) |

International career
| 1994–1997 | Ukraine | 12 | (0) |
- * Club domestic league appearances and goals

Oleh Anatoliovych Suslov (born 2 January 1969) is a Ukrainian former professional football player.

== Career overview ==
Native of Kadiivka, Suslov studied at the Luhansk sports institute. In 1986-1988, he played for Zorya Luhansk team of masters that just returned to the Pervaya Liga (tier 2). During his second professional season in 1987, Suslov played 15 games for Zorya. In 1988, he had to carry out his military duty and moved to Odesa, where he played for the sports club of the Odessa Military District, SKA Odessa. SKA Odessa played in the third tier (Vtoraya Liga), and for two seasons from 1989 to 1990, Suslov was the team's main goalie.

In 1991, Suslov moved to Chornomorets Odesa, where he played as a substitute for Viktor Hryshko. On October 5, 1991, Suslov made his debut at the Vysshaya Liga (tier 1) when he came out as a substitute during a home game against Ararat Yerevan. It became his only game at the Soviet top tier.

He played for several years in Austria, where he ended his playing career. Before that, for over 10 years, he stayed in Odesa, where he played for a couple of teams. In the 1993–94 Ukrainian Cup season, his penalty kick brought FC Chornomorets Odesa their second national club competition trophy. In the final of that competition, Chornomorets defeated Tavriya in a series of penalty kicks as the regular and extra time brought a dry tie between them, 0:0.

== Career statistics ==
=== Club ===
Appearances and goals by club, season and competition
| Club | Season | League | | Cup | | Europe | | Total | |
| Club | Season | Apps | GA | Apps | GA | Apps | GA | Apps | GA |
|---|---|---|---|---|---|---|---|---|---|
| Zorya Luhansk | 1986 | 5 | 3 | — | | — | | 5 | 3 |
| Zorya Luhansk | 1987 | 15 | 24 | 1 | 3 | — | | 16 | 27 |
| Zorya Luhansk | 1988 | 1 | 1 | — | | — | | 1 | 1 |
| SKA Odesa | 1988 | 8 | | — | | — | | 8 | |
| SKA Odesa | 1989 | 35 | 31 | — | | — | | 35 | 31 |
| SKA Odesa | 1990 | 40 | 30 | — | | — | | 40 | 30 |
| Chornomorets Odesa | 1991 | 1 | 0 | 4 | 2 | — | | 5 | 2 |
| Chornomorets Odesa | 1992 | 11 | 6 | 2 | 1 | — | | 13 | 7 |
| Chornomorets Odesa | 1992–93 | 30 | 31 | 2 | 3 | 4 | 4 | 36 | 38 |
| Chornomorets Odesa | 1993–94 | 34 | 23 | 8 | 1 | — | | 42 | 24 |
| Chornomorets Odesa | 1994–95 | 34 | 27 | 6 | 5 | 2 | 3 | 42 | 35 |
| Chornomorets Odesa | 1995–96 | 34 | 24 | 1 | 1 | 6 | 7 | 41 | 32 |
| Chornomorets Odesa | 1996–97 | 7 | 8 | 3 | 1 | 1 | 2 | 11 | 11 |
| Casino Salzburg | 1996–97 | 13 | 10 | 1 | 0 | — | | 14 | 10 |
| Casino Salzburg | 1997–98 | 2 | 4 | — | | — | | 2 | 4 |
| Casino Salzburg | 1998–99 | 18 | | — | | — | | 18 | |
| Sankt-Poelten | 1998–99 | 16 | 22 | — | | — | | 16 | 22 |
| Sankt-Poelten | 1999–2000 | 21 | 19 | — | | — | | 21 | 19 |
| Admira-Wacker | 2000–01 | 1 | 0 | 2 | 1 | — | | 3 | 1 |
| Admira-Wacker | 2001–02 | 5 | 13 | 1 | 2 | — | | 6 | 15 |
| Admira-Wacker | 2002–03 | | | | | — | | | |
| Sankt-Poelten | 2003–04 | | | | | — | | | |
| Sankt-Poelten | 2004–05 | | | | | — | | | |
| Total | | 331 | 276 | 31 | 20 | 13 | 16 | 375 | 312 |

=== International ===
Appearances and goals by national team and year
| National team | Year | Apps | GA |
|---|---|---|---|
| Ukraine | 1994 | 1 | 0 |
| Ukraine | 1995 | 5 | 7 |
| Ukraine | 1996 | 5 | 8 |
| Ukraine | 1997 | 1 | 0 |
| Total | | 12 | 15 |

== Honours ==
Chornomorets Odesa

- Ukrainian Cup: 1992 (substitute for Viktor Hryshko), 1994

Austria Salzburg

- Austrian Bundesliga: 1996–97
