= Petro Rusak =

Ukrainian footballer (born 1970)

Personal information
- Full name: Petro Romanovych Rusak
- Date of birth: 20 November 1970 (age 55)
- Height: 1.90 m (6 ft 3 in)
- Position: Forward

Senior career*
Years	Team	Apps	(Gls)
1989	FC Prykarpattya Ivano-Frankivsk	5	(0)
1991–1993	FC Prykarpattya Ivano-Frankivsk	109	(21)
1994	FC Khutrovyk Tysmenytsia	19	(9)
1995–1996	FC Prykarpattya Ivano-Frankivsk	44	(15)
1996	FC Khutrovyk Tysmenytsia	4	(1)
1996–1997	FC Chernomorets Novorossiysk	21	(3)
1997–1999	FC Prykarpattya Ivano-Frankivsk	46	(10)
1999	FC Enerhetyk Burshtyn	1	(0)
1999	Dinaburg FC	7	(0)
2001	Dinaburg FC	19	(5)
2001–2002	FC Enerhetyk Burshtyn	25	(7)
2003–2005	FC Teplovyk Ivano-Frankivsk		
2008	FC Karpaty Yaremche		
2011	FC Prykarpattia-2 Ivano-Frankivsk (amateur)		
2012	FC Khutrovyk Tysmenytsia (amateur)		
- * Club domestic league appearances and goals

Petro Romanovych Rusak (Ukrainian: Петро Романович Русак; born 20 November 1970) is a Ukrainian former footballer who played as a forward.

== Honours ==
Dinaburg

- Latvian Football Cup finalist: 2001
