= Igor Ignatov =

Russian footballer

Personal information
- Full name: Igor Vladimirovich Ignatov
- Date of birth: 12 September 1970 (age 56)
- Place of birth: Mikhaylovsk, Russian SFSR
- Height: 1.70 m (5 ft 7 in)
- Position: Forward

Youth career
- FC Uralmash Sverdlovsk

Senior career*
Years	Team	Apps	(Gls)
1987–1988	FC Uralmash Sverdlovsk	6	(0)
1988	FC Uralets Nizhny Tagil	11	(0)
1989	FC MTsOP-Metallurg Verkhnyaya Pyshma	37	(5)
1990	FC MTsOP-Metallurg Verkhnyaya Pyshma (amateur)		
1991	FC Gastello Ufa	41	(6)
1992	SC Tavriya Simferopol	0	(0)
1992	FC Gastello Ufa	28	(9)
1993	FC Uralmash Yekaterinburg	3	(0)
1995–1996	FC Mikhalyum Mikhaylovsk		
1997–1998	FC Uralmash Yekaterinburg	48	(11)
2003–2004	FC Yava-Kedr ZATO Novouralsk		
- * Club domestic league appearances and goals

Igor Vladimirovich Ignatov (Russian: Игорь Владимирович Игнатов; born 12 September 1970) is a former Russian football player.

== Club career ==
He played for SC Tavriya Simferopol in the Ukrainian Cup.

He made his Russian Premier League debut for FC Uralmash Yekaterinburg on 7 April 1993 in a game against FC Dynamo Moscow. That was his only season in the top tier.
