= West Ukrainian football derby =

Football rivalries in Ukraine

The West Ukrainian football derby was an unofficial competition as part of the Ukrainian Premier League that consisted of series of rivalries in the region of western Ukraine.

== History ==
This derby started with the establishment of the Ukrainian Premier League in 1992. Most of the time the clubs that performed the best in the derby were far from being a successful season overall in the League. Karpaty, being the best club in the region, often had a difficult time to prove themselves as such with their regional neighbors. The derby faded away to lower leagues by 2001. After 2001 new participants such as Zakarpattia and Lviv replaced other teams in the rivalry. From the initial top level participants only Karpaty and Volyn continue to perform in the premiers.

== Participants ==
Locations of teams in West Ukrainian football derby

=== 1992-2001 ===
- FC Bukovyna Chernivtsi
- FC Karpaty Lviv
- FC Nyva Ternopil
- Nyva Vinnytsia
- FC Prykarpattia Ivano-Frankivsk
- Temp Shepetivka
- FC Volyn Lutsk
- FC Veres Rivne

=== After 2001 ===
- FC Karpaty Lviv
- Lviv
- FC Volyn Lutsk
- Zakarpattia Uzhhorod

FC Nyva Vinnytsia and FC Temp Shepetivka have considered to be as teams from western part of country, yet, they are beyond the Zbruch river and thus really are outside the region. FC Lviv and FC Zakarpattia Uzhhorod came later.

== Archive ==
=== 1992 ===
Group A
Home \ Away	KLV	NYV	TSH
Karpaty Lviv		2–1	2–0
Nyva Vinnytsia	3–0		0–0
Temp Shepetivka	1–0	0–1	

Updated to match(es) played on February 2, 2009. Source: Results
Legend: Blue = home team win; Yellow = draw; Red = away team win.

Group B
Home \ Away	NVT	VOL	BUC	PIF
Nyva Ternopil		2–0	1–0	2–0
Volyn Lutsk	1–0		2–0	1–1
Bukovyna Chernivtsi	2–1	2–1		0–0
Prykarpattia	0–0	0–0	0–1	

Updated to match(es) played on February 2, 2009. Source: Results
Legend: Blue = home team win; Yellow = draw; Red = away team win.

=== 1992-93 ===
Home \ Away	KLV	VOL	BUC	NVT	VER
Karpaty Lviv		2–1	3–1	2–0	2–1
Volyn Lutsk	3–2		1–0	2–1	1–0
Bukovyna Chernivtsi	4–2	1–1		0–0	1–0
Nyva Ternopil	2–1	1–1	0–0		1–1
Veres Rivne	1–1	2–1	3–1	0–0	

Updated to match(es) played on February 2, 2009. Source: Results
Legend: Blue = home team win; Yellow = draw; Red = away team win.

=== 1993-94 ===
Home \ Away	KLV	NVT	VOL	VER	BUC
Karpaty Lviv		1–0	1–2	0–0	1–0
Nyva Ternopil	1–1		2–1	3–0	3–0
Volyn Lutsk	1–0	1–0		1–1	2–0
Veres Rivne	0–0	0–0	0–0		1–0
Bukovyna Chernivtsi	3–2	0–0	1–0	1–1	

Updated to match(es) played on February 2, 2009. Source: Results
Legend: Blue = home team win; Yellow = draw; Red = away team win.

=== 1994-95 ===
Home \ Away	KLV	PIF	NVT	VOL	VER
Karpaty Lviv		0–0	1–0	1–0	0–1
Prykarpattia	1–1		3–2	3–0	2–2
Nyva Ternopil	2–1	3–0		3–0	3–0
Volyn Lutsk	3–0	1–0	2–1		2–1
Veres Rivne	2–0	0–1	1–0	2–1	

Updated to match(es) played on February 2, 2009. Source: Results
Legend: Blue = home team win; Yellow = draw; Red = away team win.

== See also ==
- Ukrainian Premier League
- Ukrainian derby
