= Ivan Balan =

Ukrainian footballer (born 1949)

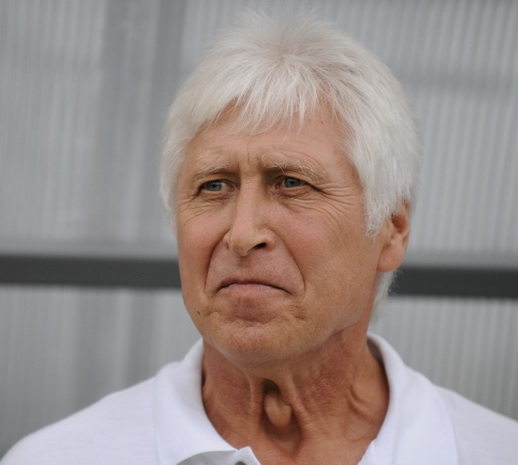

Personal information
- Full name: Ivan Dmytrovych Balan
- Date of birth: 1 June 1949 (age 77)
- Place of birth: Mala Vyska, Kirovohrad Oblast, USSR
- Height: 1.78 m (5 ft 10 in)
- Position: Goalkeeper

Senior career*
Years	Team	Apps	(Gls)
1972–1980	Sudnobudivnyk Mykolayiv	170	(2)

Managerial career
- 1985: Sudnobudivnyk Mykolayiv (assistant)
- 1986–1988: Sudnobudivnyk Mykolayiv
- 1989–1992: Evis Mykolayiv
- 1993: Krystal Kherson
- 1996: Tavriya Simferopol
- 1997: Tavriya Simferopol (caretaker)
- 1998: Tavriya Simferopol
- 2001–2005: Metalurh Mariupol (assistant)
- 2005–2007: Illichivets Mariupol
- 2007: Illichivets Mariupol (caretaker)
- 2008–2012: Vorskla Poltava (assistant)
- 2012–2015: Illichivets Mariupol (assistant)
- 2015–2017: Mykolaiv (director)
- 2017–2019: Vorskla Poltava (assistant)
- * Club domestic league appearances and goals

Ivan Dmytrovych Balan (Ukrainian: Іван Дмитрович Балан; born 1 June 1949) is a Ukrainian football coach and former player.

== Career ==
Balan began playing football as a goalkeeper in the youth system of Sudnobudivnyk Mykolayiv. In 1972, he joined the club's senior side and eventually scored two goals while playing occasionally in the outfield. Due to the age limit utilized in the Soviet Second League, Balan retired from playing at age 31.

Balan managed his former club Sudnobudivnyk Mykolayiv, leading it to a second-place finish in the 1990 Soviet Lower Second League, Zone 1. After managing the club in the 1991 Soviet Second League, Balan led the club during the inaugural 1992 Ukrainian Premier League season (operating under the name Evis Mykolayiv) but resigned as the club were relegated to the second tier.

Balan was appointed manager of Ukrainian Premier League side Illichivets Mariupol in 2004, and managed the club until he was fired when the club dropped into last place following a loss against FC Chornomorets Odesa in the 23rd round of the 2006–07 season.

== Coaching Record ==
Season Division	Club	Record W-D-L	Goals GF–GA	Standing	Notes
1992; Division 1	Evis	3–4–11	12–29	9/10	relegation
