= Dmitri Gulenkov =

Russian footballer

Personal information
- Full name: Dmitri Valentinovich Gulenkov
- Date of birth: 22 May 1968 (age 58)
- Place of birth: Moscow, Russian SFSR
- Height: 1.89 m (6 ft 2 1/2 in)
- Position: Goalkeeper

Youth career
- FShM Moscow

Senior career*
Years	Team	Apps	(Gls)
1984–1986	FShM Moscow	8	(0)
1988	SK EShVSM Moscow	6	(0)
1988	FC Zorkiy Krasnogorsk	17	(0)
1989	FC Torpedo Moscow	0	(0)
1989	FC Zorkiy Krasnogorsk	41	(0)
1990	FC Volga Tver	32	(0)
1991	Pakhtakor Tashkent FK	0	(0)
1991	Navbahor Namangan	8	(0)
1992	Tavriya Simferopol	5	(0)
1993–1994	FC Okean Nakhodka	35	(0)
1993	→ FC Okean-d Nakhodka (loan)	2	(0)
1995	Navbahor Namangan	12	(0)
1996	Tianjin Samsung	1	(0)
1997	FC Tom Tomsk	14	(0)
1998	FC Spartak-Chukotka Moscow (amateur)		
1999	FC Servis-Kholod Moscow (amateur)		

Managerial career
- 2003–2004: FC Metallurg Krasnoyarsk (assistant)
- * Club domestic league appearances and goals

Dmitri Valentinovich Gulenkov (Russian: Дмитрий Валентинович Гуленков; born 22 May 1968) is a Russian football coach and a former player.

== Honours ==
Tavriya Simferopol

- Ukrainian Premier League champion: 1992

Navbahor Namangan

- Uzbek League bronze: 1995
- Uzbekistan Cup winner: 1995
