= 1978 Soviet First League =

Soviet First League
- Season: 1978
- Champions: Krylia Sovetov Kuibyshev
- Promoted: Krylia Sovetov Kuibyshev; SKA Rostov-on-Don; Dinamo Minsk

The 1978 Soviet First League was the eighth season of the Soviet First League and the 38th season of the Soviet second-tier league competition.

Krylia Sovetov Kuibyshev secured an immediate return to the top-flight of Soviet football only a season after relegation as First League champions. They are joined in promotion by SKA Rostov-on-Don and Dinamo Minsk.

== Standings ==
Pos	Rep	Team	Pld	W	D	L	GF	GA	GD	Pts	Promotion
1	RUS	(Russian Soviet Federative Socialist Republic) Krylia Sovetov Kuibyshev (C, P)	38	21	14	3	59	25	+34	56	Promotion to Top League
2	RUS	(Russian Soviet Federative Socialist Republic) SKA Rostov-on-Don (P)	38	20	14	4	64	35	+29	54	Promotion to Top League
3	BLR	(Byelorussian Soviet Socialist Republic) Dinamo Minsk (P)	38	21	11	6	57	28	+29	53	Promotion to Top League
4	UKR	(Ukrainian Soviet Socialist Republic) Karpaty Lviv	38	21	10	7	60	37	+23	52	
5	RUS	(Russian Soviet Federative Socialist Republic) Terek Grozny	38	16	9	13	56	56	0	41	
6	RUS	(Russian Soviet Federative Socialist Republic) Kuban Krasnodar	38	16	9	13	51	46	+5	41	
7	LTU	(Lithuanian Soviet Socialist Republic) Žalgiris Vilnius	38	11	19	8	38	37	+1	41	
8	UKR	(Ukrainian Soviet Socialist Republic) Tavriya Simferopol	38	14	12	12	48	38	+10	40	
9	GEO	(Georgian Soviet Socialist Republic) Torpedo Kutaisi	38	14	9	15	44	41	+3	37	
10	MDA	(Moldavian Soviet Socialist Republic) Nistru Chișinău	38	13	11	14	42	40	+2	37	
11	UKR	(Ukrainian Soviet Socialist Republic) SKA Odessa	38	12	10	16	43	51	−8	34	
12	RUS	(Russian Soviet Federative Socialist Republic) Shinnik Yaroslavl	38	12	10	16	37	42	−5	34	
13	TJK	(Tajik Soviet Socialist Republic) Pamir Dushanbe	38	10	14	14	47	41	+6	34	
14	UKR	(Ukrainian Soviet Socialist Republic) Metalurh Zaporizhzhia	38	10	14	14	39	47	−8	34	
15	UKR	(Ukrainian Soviet Socialist Republic) Spartak Ivano-Frankivsk	38	13	6	19	43	58	−15	32	
16	RUS	(Russian Soviet Federative Socialist Republic) Kuzbass Kemerovo	38	12	7	19	38	54	−16	31	
17	RUS	(Russian Soviet Federative Socialist Republic) Uralmash Sverdlovsk	38	10	11	17	31	50	−19	31	
18	RUS	(Russian Soviet Federative Socialist Republic) Spartak Orzhonikidze	38	10	8	20	30	50	−20	28	
19	RUS	(Russian Soviet Federative Socialist Republic) Dinamo Leningrad	38	7	13	18	47	65	−18	27	
20	TKM	(Turkmen Soviet Socialist Republic) Kolhozchi Ashgabad	38	7	9	22	27	60	−33	23	

Source: RSSSF
(C) Champions; (P) Promoted

== Number of teams by union republic ==
Rank	Union republic	Number of teams	Club(s)
1	RSFSR	9	Terek Grozny, Kuban Krasnodar, Shinnik Yaroslavl, Kuzbass Kemerevo, Uralmash Sverdlovsk, Spartak Ordzhonikidze, Dinamo Leningrad, Krylia Sovetov Kuibyshev, SKA Rostov-na-Donu
2	Ukrainian SSR	5	Karpaty Lvov, Tavria Simferopol, SKA Odessa, Metallurg Zaporozhye, Prykarpatye Ivano-Frankovsk
3	Belarusian SSR	1	Dinamo Minsk
3	Lithuanian SSR	1	Žalgiris Vilnius
3	Georgian SSR	1	Torpedo Kutaisi
3	Moldavian SSR	1	Nistru Kishinev
3	Tajik SSR	1	Pamir Dushanbe
3	Turkmen SSR	1	Kolhozchi Ashkhabad

== See also ==
- Soviet First League
