= Vitaliy Shalychev =

Soviet footballer and Ukrainian coach (1946–2021)

Personal information
- Full name: Vitaliy Semenovych Shalychev
- Date of birth: 30 October 1946
- Place of birth: Chystyakove, Stalino Oblast, Ukrainian SSR, Soviet Union
- Date of death: 22 June 2021 (aged 74)
- Position: Midfielder

Senior career*
Years	Team	Apps	(Gls)
1965	Shakhtar Torez	11	(4)
1965–1970	Shakhtar Donetsk	56	(9)
1966–1967	→ Tavriya Simferopol (loan)	59	(11)
1971–1972	Dnipro Dnipropetrovsk	12	(2)
1973–1974	Avanhard Sevastopol	43	(11)
1974–1977	Kolhozchi Aşgabat	103	(26)
Total		284	(63)

Managerial career
- 1984–1985: Kryvbas Kryvyi Rih (assistant)
- 1986–1990: FC Ocean Kerch
- 1995: SC Tavriya Simferopol
- 2001: Metalist Kharkiv
- 2007–2008: SC Tavriya Simferopol (assistant)
- * Club domestic league appearances and goals

Vitaliy Semenovych Shalychev (30 October 1946 – 22 June 2021) was a Soviet football player and a Ukrainian football coach. He was born in Chystyakove.
