= Mykola Yurchenko =

Ukrainian footballer

Personal information
- Full name: Mykola Mykolayovych Yurchenko
- Date of birth: 31 March 1966 (age 60)
- Place of birth: Ivano-Frankivsk, Ukraine, Soviet Union
- Height: 1.83 m (6 ft 0 in)
- Position: Forward

Youth career
- Spartak youth school (Ivano-Frankivsk)

Senior career*
Years	Team	Apps	(Gls)
1983–1984	Shakhtar (reserves)	0	(0)
1987	Prykarpattya Ivano-Frankivsk	46	(5)
1988–1989	SKA Lviv/Halychyna Drohobych	30	(0)
1989	Kryvbas Kryvyi Rih	15	(10)
1990	Prykarpattia	20	(6)
1991	Dynamo Kyiv	18	(1)
1991–1993	Zbrojovka/Boby Brno	?	(?)
1993–1995	Prykarpattia	47	(18)

International career
1994	Ukraine	1	(0)
- * Club domestic league appearances and goals

Mykola Mykolayovych Yurchenko (Ukrainian: Микола Миколайович Юрченко; born 31 March 1966) is the Soviet and Ukrainian professional footballer known for his performance in the Ukrainian club Prykarpattia Ivano-Frankivsk. Mykola has an older brother Ihor Yurchenko whose name is also tightly intertwined with the fate of the western Ukrainian club.

== Playing career ==
His primary football development obtained in the Spartak youth academy in Ivano-Frankivsk. He made his professional debut in the tournament for the reserve teams of the Soviet Top League playing for Shakhtar Donetsk. By the end of the 1980s he moved back to the Western Ukraine playing in Ivano-Frankivsk, Lviv, and Drohobych. After a short stint at Kryvbas Yurchenko returned to Prykarpattia. In 1991, he finally made his debut in the Soviet Top League playing for Dynamo Kyiv. With the fall of the Soviet Union he moved to Brno playing in the Czech Premiers. Eventually he returned once again to Prykarpattia where he finished his career in 1995 after the club made to the Ukrainian Premier League.

== Honours ==
- Ukrainian First League champion.

== National team ==
Yurchenko played only a single game for the national team on 15 March 1994. In the game against Israel he substituted Dmytro Mykhaylenko on the 60th minute. Ukraine has lost the game at home 0:1.
