= Serhiy Tatulian =

Ukrainian football referee

- Full name: Serhiy Arshakovych Tatulian
- Born: 1 March 1956 (age 70); Gagra, Georgian SSR

Domestic
Years	League	Role

International
Years	League	Role

Serhiy Arshakovych Tatulian (Ukrainian: Сергій Аршакович Татулян, born 3 March 1956 in Gagra, Georgia) is a former Ukrainian professional football referee.
