= Igor Volkov (Uzbekistani footballer) =

Uzbekistani footballer

Personal information
- Full name: Igor Aleksandrovich Volkov
- Date of birth: 23 August 1971 (age 55)
- Height: 1.84 m (6 ft 1/2 in)
- Position: Midfielder

Senior career*
Years	Team	Apps	(Gls)
1990–1991	Geolog Qarshi	56	(11)
1992–1993	Pakhtakor Tashkent	46	(7)
1994	Neftchi Fergana	2	(0)
1994	Atlaschi	9	(0)
1994–1996	Torpedo Moscow	31	(2)
1994–1996	→ Torpedo-Luzhniki-d Moscow	13	(4)
1998	Metallurg Krasnoyarsk	13	(1)
1999	Gazovik-Gazprom Izhevsk	1	(0)
1999	Dynamo Stavropol	4	(0)
2000	Metallurg Bekabad	9	(0)
2004	Dnepr-Transmash Mogilev	5	(0)
2007–2008	Rosich Moskovsky		
- * Club domestic league appearances and goals

Igor Aleksandrovich Volkov (Russian: Игорь Александрович Волков; born 23 August 1971) is a former Uzbekistani football player.
