= 1979 Soviet First League =

Soviet First League
- Season: 1979

The 1979 Soviet First League was the ninth season of the Soviet First League and the 39th season of the Soviet second tier league competition.

== Final standings ==
Pos	Team	Pld	W	D	L	GF	GA	GD	Pts	Promotion or relegation
1	(Ukrainian Soviet Socialist Republic) Karpaty Lviv (C, P)	46	27	10	9	89	43	+46	64	Promotion to Top League
2	(Russian Soviet Federative Socialist Republic) Kuban Krasnodar (P)	46	22	12	12	70	43	+27	56	Promotion to Top League
3	(Tajik Soviet Socialist Republic) Pamir Dushanbe	46	23	7	16	56	50	+6	53	
4	(Russian Soviet Federative Socialist Republic) Shinnik Yaroslavl	46	20	15	11	50	38	+12	52 (Note: There was a draw limit for the draws earned, 12. Only twelve draws earn a point, in contrast, over the limit draws earn no points.)	
5	(Russian Soviet Federative Socialist Republic) Fakel Voronezh	46	20	10	16	70	54	+16	50	
6	(Lithuanian Soviet Socialist Republic) Žalgiris Vilnius	46	19	10	17	61	54	+7	48	
7	(Ukrainian Soviet Socialist Republic) Metalist Kharkiv	46	19	10	17	43	47	−4	48	
8	(Moldavian Soviet Socialist Republic) Nistru Kishinev	46	18	14	14	53	51	+2	48	
9	(Russian Soviet Federative Socialist Republic) Uralmash Sverdlovsk	46	18	12	16	55	45	+10	48	
10	(Ukrainian Soviet Socialist Republic) Metallurg Zaporozhia	46	19	8	19	69	65	+4	46	
11	(Georgian Soviet Socialist Republic) Torpedo Kutaisi	46	17	15	14	44	40	+4	46	
12	(Russian Soviet Federative Socialist Republic) Kuzbass Kemerovo	46	17	12	17	49	50	−1	46	
13	(Russian Soviet Federative Socialist Republic) Spartak Ordjonikidze	46	19	7	20	49	44	+5	45	
14	(Ukrainian Soviet Socialist Republic) Spartak Ivano-Frankivsk	46	19	7	20	52	61	−9	45	
15	(Ukrainian Soviet Socialist Republic) SKA Odessa	46	17	11	18	54	61	−7	45	
16	(Russian Soviet Federative Socialist Republic) Spartak Nalchik	46	16	12	18	50	48	+2	44	
17	(Ukrainian Soviet Socialist Republic) Dnipro Dnipropetrovsk	46	16	14	16	57	60	−3	44	
18	(Ukrainian Soviet Socialist Republic) Tavria Simferopol	46	16	11	19	50	56	−6	43	
19	(Russian Soviet Federative Socialist Republic) Terek Grozny (R)	46	17	8	21	59	63	−4	42	Relegation to Second League
20	(Russian Soviet Federative Socialist Republic) Zvezda Perm (R)	46	16	9	21	45	56	−11	41	Relegation to Second League
21	(Kazakh Soviet Socialist Republic) Traktor Pavlodar (R)	46	14	11	21	37	57	−20	39	Relegation to Second League
22	(Russian Soviet Federative Socialist Republic) Dinamo Leningrad (R)	46	15	8	23	52	57	−5	38	Relegation to Second League
23	(Turkmen Soviet Socialist Republic) Kolhozchi Ashkhabad (R)	46	11	12	23	41	76	−35	34	Relegation to Second League
24	(Kirghiz Soviet Socialist Republic) Alga Frunze (R)	46	10	9	27	37	73	−36	29	Relegation to Second League

Source: rsssf.com
(C) Champions; (P) Promoted; (R) Relegated

== Number of teams by union republic ==
Rank	Union republic	Number of teams	Club(s)
1	RSFSR	10	Kuban Krasnodar, Shinnik Yaroslavl, Fakel Voronezh, Uralmash Sverdlovsk, Kuzbass Kemerevo, Spartak Ordzhonikidze, Spartak Nalchik, Terek Grozny, Zvezda Perm, Dinamo Leningrad
2	Ukrainian SSR	7	Karpaty Lvov, Metallist Kharkov, Metallurg Zaporozhye, Prykarpatye Ivano-Frankovsk, SKA Odessa, Dnepr Dnepropetrovsk, Tavria Simferopol
3	Tajik SSR	1	Pamir Dushanbe
3	Lithuanian SSR	1	Žalgiris Vilnius
3	Moldavian SSR	1	Nistru Kishinev
3	Georgian SSR	1	Torpedo Kutaisi
3	Kazakh SSR	1	Traktor Pavlodar
3	Turkmen SSR	1	Kolhozchi Ashkhabad
3	Kyrgyz SSR	1	Alga Frunze
