= 1978 Soviet Second League =

Second League
- Season: 1978

1978 Soviet Second League was a Soviet competition in the Soviet Second League.

== Qualifying groups ==
=== Group I [Northwest and Central] ===
Pos	Rep	Team	Pld	W	D	L	GF	GA	GD	Pts	Promotion
1	RUS	Fakel Voronezh	46	36	8	2	105	17	+88	80	Promoted
2	RUS	Iskra Smolensk	46	33	6	7	81	31	+50	72	
3	RUS	Volga Kalinin	46	30	9	7	84	33	+51	69	
4	RUS	Textilshchik Ivanovo	46	26	13	7	66	32	+34	65	
5	RUS	Novolipetsk Lipetsk	46	24	10	12	66	37	+29	58	
6	BLR	Dinamo Brest	46	24	10	12	62	37	+25	58	
7	LVA	Daugava Riga	46	25	6	15	75	48	+27	56	
8	RUS	Spartak Kostroma	46	20	13	13	62	51	+11	53	
9	RUS	Dinamo Vologda	46	19	14	13	45	33	+12	52	
10	LTU	Atlantas Klaipeda	46	20	11	15	63	42	+21	51	
11	RUS	Lokomotiv Kaluga	46	21	7	18	54	59	−5	49	
12	RUS	Torpedo Vladimir	46	19	10	17	45	40	+5	48	
13	BLR	Khimik Grodno	46	14	16	16	42	54	−12	44	
14	BLR	GomSelMash Gomel (Note: Mashinostroitel Gomel changed name to GomSelMash.)	46	16	9	21	56	60	−4	41	
15	BLR	Dvina Vitebsk	46	13	15	18	43	43	0	41	
16	BLR	Dnepr Mogilyov	46	15	10	21	51	56	−5	40	
17	LVA	Zvejnieks Liepaja	46	12	13	21	32	50	−18	37	
18	RUS	Baltika Kaliningrad	46	11	11	24	51	74	−23	33	
19	RUS	Saturn Rybinsk	46	7	18	21	31	57	−26	32	
20	RUS	Dinamo Bryansk	46	11	9	26	37	72	−35	31	
21	RUS	Moskvich Moskva	46	12	5	29	37	86	−49	29	
22	RUS	Volzhanin Kineshma	46	9	7	30	42	105	−63	25	
23	RUS	Sever Murmansk	46	7	10	29	23	85	−62	24	
24	RUS	Krasnaya Presnya Moskva	46	4	8	34	25	76	−51	16	

=== Group II [Ukraine] ===
Pos	Team	Pld	W	D	L	GF	GA	GD	Pts	Promotion or relegation
1	Metalist Kharkiv (C, P)	44	29	12	3	66	20	+46	70	Promoted
2	Kolos Nikopol	44	26	10	8	59	32	+27	62	
3	SKA Kiev	44	23	14	7	71	29	+42	60	
4	Kryvbas Kryvyi Rih	44	24	11	9	63	29	+34	59	
5	Bukovyna Chernivtsi	44	23	11	10	55	25	+30	57	
6	Krystal Kherson	44	20	14	10	46	28	+18	54	
7	Zirka Kirovohrad	44	17	15	12	42	33	+9	49	
8	Avanhard Rovno	44	19	9	16	55	39	+16	47	
9	SKA Lviv	44	16	14	14	52	43	+9	46	
10	Spartak Zhytomyr	44	19	7	18	50	40	+10	45	
11	Desna Chernihiv	44	16	13	15	37	33	+4	45	
12	Lokomotyv Vinnytsia	44	14	16	14	30	31	−1	44	
13	Hoverla Uzhhorod	44	15	10	19	44	53	−9	40	
14	Atlantyka Sevastopol	44	13	13	18	49	54	−5	39	
15	Sudnobudivnyk Mykolaiv	44	11	16	17	38	46	−8	38	
16	Kolos Poltava	44	14	9	21	40	53	−13	37	
17	Novator Zhdanov	44	12	12	20	53	70	−17	36	
18	Dnipro Cherkasy	44	11	12	21	29	53	−24	34	
19	Podillya Khmelnytskyi	44	12	9	23	28	56	−28	33	
20	Frunzenets Sumy	44	10	13	21	39	59	−20	33	
21	Torpedo Lutsk	44	13	6	25	32	72	−40	32	
22	Shakhtar Horlivka	44	13	5	26	36	72	−36	31	Avoided relegation
23	Start Tiraspol	44	6	9	29	22	66	−44	21	Moldavian SSR; Avoided relegation

(C) Champions; (P) Promoted

=== Group III [Volga–Russian South] ===
Pos	Team	Pld	W	D	L	GF	GA	GD	Pts	Promotion
1	Spartak Nalchik	46	29	9	8	86	38	+48	67	Promoted
2	Mashuk Pyatigorsk	46	27	9	10	75	34	+41	63	
3	RostSelMash Rostov-na-Donu	46	22	16	8	84	43	+41	60	
4	Rotor Volgograd	46	22	12	12	76	38	+38	56	
5	Sokol Saratov	46	20	15	11	61	37	+24	55	
6	Druzhba Maykop	46	20	14	12	42	39	+3	54	
7	Torpedo Taganrog	46	21	10	15	55	41	+14	52	
8	Znamya Truda Orekhovo-Zuyevo	46	18	15	13	43	37	+6	51	
9	Cement Novorossiysk	46	18	13	15	49	57	−8	49	
10	Uralan Elista	46	21	6	19	60	59	+1	48	
11	Volga Gorkiy	46	18	12	16	50	46	+4	48	
12	Dinamo Makhachkala	46	19	9	18	67	54	+13	47	
13	Stal Cheboksary	46	18	11	17	48	53	−5	47	
14	Spartak Oryol	46	17	10	19	55	60	−5	44	
15	Spartak Ryazan	46	17	10	19	39	45	−6	44	
16	Volgar Astrakhan	46	16	12	18	61	67	−6	44	
17	Dinamo Stavropol	46	16	10	20	64	68	−4	42	
18	Salyut Belgorod	46	16	8	22	56	71	−15	40	
19	Khimik Novomoskovsk	46	15	9	22	44	61	−17	39	
20	Trud Volzhskiy (Note: Torpedo Volzhskiy changed name to Trud.)	46	14	7	25	52	73	−21	35	
21	Khimik Dzerzhinsk	46	11	13	22	36	64	−28	35	
22	Revtrud Tambov	46	8	14	24	43	75	−32	30	
23	Avangard Kursk	46	9	9	28	39	94	−55	27	
24	Mashinostroitel Tula	46	8	11	27	39	70	−31	27	

=== Group IV [Caucasus and Ural] ===
Pos	Rep	Team	Pld	W	D	L	GF	GA	GD	Pts	Promotion
1	RUS	Zvezda Perm	46	25	10	11	77	42	+35	60	Promoted
2	GEO	Guria Lanchkhuti	46	24	11	11	82	48	+34	59	
3	GEO	Dinamo Zugdidi	46	21	11	14	64	45	+19	53	
4	ARM	Shirak Leninakan	46	19	15	12	73	51	+22	53	
5	RUS	Torpedo Togliatti	46	20	12	14	61	37	+24	52	
6	RUS	Rubin Kazan	46	20	12	14	64	50	+14	52	
7	ARM	Kotaik Abovyan	46	23	5	18	66	64	+2	51	
8	GEO	Lokomotiv Samtredia	46	21	8	17	74	71	+3	50	
9	GEO	Dila Gori	46	18	14	14	59	53	+6	50	
10	RUS	Druzhba Yoshkar-Ola	46	22	5	19	57	54	+3	49	
11	AZE	Avtomobilist Baku	46	20	9	17	60	60	0	49	
12	RUS	Zenit Izhevsk	46	16	17	13	67	53	+14	49	
13	GEO	Dinamo Batumi	46	18	12	16	62	48	+14	48	
14	RUS	Turbina Naberezhnyye Chelny	46	21	5	20	53	63	−10	47	
15	AZE	Karabakh Stepanakert	46	19	9	18	55	46	+9	47	
16	RUS	Gazovik Orenburg	46	17	10	19	58	56	+2	44	
17	RUS	Dinamo Kirov	46	17	9	20	64	65	−1	43	
18	GEO	Dinamo Sukhumi	46	15	12	19	61	66	−5	42	
19	RUS	Uralets Nizhniy Tagil	46	16	8	22	63	69	−6	40	
20	ARM	SKIF Yerevan	46	12	16	18	40	49	−9	40	
21	RUS	Gastello Ufa	46	14	10	22	48	61	−13	38	
22	AZE	Hazar Lenkoran	46	14	8	24	44	76	−32	36	
23	AZE	Progress Kirovabad	46	13	3	30	45	97	−52	29	
24	AZE	Araz Nahichevan	46	9	5	32	38	111	−73	23	

=== Group V [Central Asia and West Siberia] ===
Pos	Rep	Team	Pld	W	D	L	GF	GA	GD	Pts	Promotion
1	KGZ	Alga Frunze	44	29	9	6	66	22	+44	67	Promoted
2	UZB	Avtomobilist Termez	44	30	4	10	81	45	+36	64	
3	UZB	Yangiyer	44	26	8	10	67	30	+37	60	
4	UZB	Zarafshan Navoi	44	24	7	13	76	49	+27	55	
5	UZB	Buston Jizak (Note: Irrigator Jizak changed name to Buston.)	44	23	8	13	68	47	+21	54	
6	UZB	Shahrihanets Shahrihan	44	22	8	14	58	36	+22	52	
7	KAZ	Khimik Jambul	44	23	5	16	66	51	+15	51	
8	UZB	Horezm Yangiaryk	44	19	13	12	66	43	+23	51	
9	UZB	Hiva	44	20	8	16	59	44	+15	48	
10	RUS	Stroitel Tyumen (Note: Neftyanik Tyumen changed name to Stroitel.)	44	20	8	16	53	51	+2	48	
11	UZB	Neftyanik Fergana	44	19	6	19	57	58	−1	44	
12	UZB	Pahtachi Gulistan	44	19	6	19	51	51	0	44	
13	RUS	Metallurg Magnitogorsk	44	16	10	18	58	65	−7	42	
14	UZB	Amudarya Nukus	44	15	9	20	39	54	−15	39	
15	RUS	Signal Chelyabinsk	44	13	12	19	44	56	−12	38	
16	KAZ	Orbita Kzil-Orda	44	16	5	23	48	52	−4	37	
17	KAZ	Metallurg Chimkent	44	14	9	21	46	65	−19	37	
18	KAZ	Aktyubinets Aktyubinsk	44	15	6	23	41	66	−25	36	
19	UZB	Dinamo Samarkand	44	12	10	22	46	69	−23	34	
20	TJK	Hojent Leninabad	44	14	5	25	56	78	−22	33	
21	UZB	Textilshchik Namangan	44	12	7	25	32	64	−32	31	
22	UZB	KarshiStroi Karshi	44	9	9	26	30	69	−39	27	
23	UZB	Start Tashkent	44	8	4	32	33	76	−43	20	

=== Group VI (Kazakhstan and East Siberia) ===
Pos	Rep	Team	Pld	W	D	L	GF	GA	GD	Pts	Promotion
1	KAZ	Traktor Pavlodar	40	25	7	8	59	24	+35	57	Promoted
2	KAZ	Shakhtyor Karaganda	40	23	9	8	67	37	+30	55	
3	KAZ	Tselinnik Tselinograd	40	20	10	10	65	44	+21	50	
4	RUS	Angara Angarsk	40	21	7	12	52	40	+12	49	
5	RUS	Zvezda Irkutsk	40	19	7	14	64	47	+17	45	
6	RUS	Dinamo Barnaul	40	17	10	13	44	43	+1	44	
7	RUS	SKA Khabarovsk	40	16	12	12	63	49	+14	44	
8	RUS	Chkalovets Novosibirsk	40	17	8	15	52	54	−2	42	
9	RUS	Luch Vladivostok	40	15	12	13	55	50	+5	42	
10	RUS	Torpedo Rubtsovsk	40	15	12	13	48	43	+5	42	
11	RUS	Lokomotiv Ulan-Ude (Note: Selenga Ulan-Ude changed name to Lokomotiv.)	40	17	7	16	40	47	−7	41	
12	RUS	Avtomobilist Krasnoyarsk	40	16	8	16	45	53	−8	40	
13	KAZ	Spartak Semipalatinsk	40	15	9	16	61	50	+11	39	
14	RUS	Irtysh Omsk	40	14	10	16	55	60	−5	38	
15	KAZ	Vostok Ust-Kamenogorsk	40	13	7	20	46	56	−10	33	
16	RUS	Amur Blagoveshchensk	40	12	9	19	42	52	−10	33	
17	KAZ	Gornyak Nikolskiy	40	12	8	20	51	65	−14	32	
18	KAZ	Bulat Temirtau	40	12	8	20	36	47	−11	32	
19	RUS	Amur Komsomolsk-na-Amure	40	11	10	19	40	53	−13	32	
20	RUS	Torpedo Tomsk	40	8	12	20	46	71	−25	28	
21	RUS	Energiya Bratsk	40	8	6	26	32	78	−46	22	

Source: rsssf.com
