= Talyat Sheikhametov =

Retired Soviet Ukrainian professional footballer

Personal information
- Full name: Talyat Abdulganiyevich Sheikhametov
- Date of birth: 24 April 1966 (age 60)
- Place of birth: Shahrisabz, Uzbek SSR
- Height: 1.78 m (5 ft 10 in)
- Position: Forward

Team information
- Current team: Ukraine U-21 (assistant coach)

Senior career*
Years	Team	Apps	(Gls)
1983	Khisar FC Shahrisabz	20	(2)
1985	FC Geolog Qarshi	15	(3)
1989	Pakhtakor Tashkent FK	6	(1)
1990–1994	SC Tavriya Simferopol	82	(17)
1993	→ Hakoah Amidar Ramat Gan F.C.	5	(1)
1994	→ Maccabi Herzliya F.C.	10	(1)
1994–1996	FC Kremin Kremenchuk	26	(2)
1994–1995	→ Hakoah Amidar Ramat Gan F.C.	1	(0)
1997–1998	SC Mykolaiv	35	(11)
1998	FC Metalurh Nikopol	10	(5)

Managerial career
- 2016–: Ukraine U-21 (assistant coach)
Medal record
SC Tavriya Simferopol
Winner	Ukrainian Top League	1992
Runner-up	Ukrainian Cup	1993–94
SC Mykolaiv
Winner	Ukrainian First League	1997–98
- * Club domestic league appearances and goals

Talyat Abdulganiyevich Sheikhametov (born 24 April 1966 in Shahrisabz) is a retired Soviet and later Ukrainian professional footballer. His first name often spells as Tolyat.
