= FC Spartak Ivano-Frankivsk =

Spartak Ivano-Frankivsk
- Logo in the 2006–07 season
- Full name: FC Spartak Ivano-Frankivsk
- Founded: 1940
- Dissolved: 2007
- Ground: Central Stadium Rukh; Elektron Stadium (alternative)
- Capacity: 16,000
- Chairman: Taras Klym
- League: Druha Liha defunct
- 2006–07: 17th
Home colours	Away colours

the crest was used in 2003–2006

FC Spartak Ivano-Frankivsk was a Ukrainian football team based in Ivano-Frankivsk, Ivano-Frankivsk Oblast, Ukraine, the unofficial capital of the Prykarpattia region.

== History ==
The club was founded in 1940 after the Soviet occupation of the Eastern Poland during the World War II. All previous local sports clubs were liquidated and replaced with "proletarian".

In 1956 the club gained promotion to the Soviet Class B (second tier) by winning a play-off match-up against SKCF Sevastopol in 1955. Since that time, Ivano-Frankivsk had at least one club in football competitions among teams of masters until dissolution of the Soviet Union.

In 1981 until 2003 the club competed under the name FC Prykarpattia Ivano-Frankivsk and in 1989 (the Perestroika epoch) was converted from team of masters to professional club by "western standards". In 1981 – 1989 the team of masters belonged to the local Soviet scientific and defense manufacturer Positron.

In 1992 Prykarpattia Ivano-Frankivsk was admitted to the first Ukrainian Premier League, after being initially chosen to participate for being a runner-up from 1st Zone of the Soviet Second League B in 1991. After being demoted following their first season, the club returned to the Ukrainian Premier League in 1994 and remained there for six seasons.

In 2003 the club managed to preserve its place in the Ukrainian First League only with the help of LUKOR Kalush (FC Kalush) that was financed by the Russian Lukoil and coincidentally merged with Ivano-Frankivsk club after winning the Second League and obtaining promotion to the First League. Upon merging of two clubs, the Ivano-Frankivsk team was renamed to Spartak as a "People Football Club", while Kalush team became Prykarpattia-2.

After the 2006-07 season Spartak was finally relegated to the Second League, with no money. The club folded right before the start of the next season. Following liquidation of its senior, the club continues to field its junior squads in competitions of Ukrainian Youth League.

Prykarpattia Ivano-Frankivsk's best achievement in the Ukrainian Premier League was eleventh place (twice, in 1994–95 and 1995–96).

The team's colours were red shirts and white shorts.

== Top scorers ==
- 2000 – Andriy Spivak 6
- 1999 – Vitaliy Shumsky 5
- 1998 – Petro Rusak 9
- 1997 – Andriy Zavyalov 9
- 1996 – Pavlo Irichuk and Petro Rusak 9
- 1995 – Ihor Yurchenko 8
- 1992 – Yuri Shulyatytsky 3
- 1991 – Roman Hryhorchuk 26
- 1990 – Mykola Yurchenko 6
- 1989 – Yaroslav Dumansky 13 (Master of Sports of International Level)

== Notable managers ==
- Viktor Lukashenko, 1972 Ukrainian republican championship winner, 1973 Ukrainian Cup finalist
- Viktor Kozyn, first manager of reorganized football club in 1989
- Ivan Krasnetskyi, 1991 Ukrainian republican championship runner-up and admission to the top league, first manager in competitions of the independent Ukraine
- Ihor Yurchenko, 1994 First League winner
- Bohdan Blavatskyi, first manager of the revived Spartak in 2003

== Club's Presidents ==
- 1940–1981 (Soviet Union) Spartak sports society
- 1982–1989 (Soviet Union) Zenit sports society
- 1989–2001 (Ukraine) Anatoliy Revutskyi
- 2001–2002 (Ukraine) Anatoliy Popadiuk
- 2003–2005 (Russia) Sergei Chmykhalov (Lukoil)
- 2006–2007 (Ukraine) Taras Klym

== Honours ==
- Soviet First League
  - Runner-up (1): 1957
- Ukrainian Cup
  - Runner up (1): 1973
- Championship of the Ukrainian SSR
  - Winners (3): 1955, 1969, 1972
  - Runner-up (2): 1991
- Ukrainian First League
  - Winner (1): 1994

== Derbies ==
The fiercest rivalry of the club was with FC Nyva Ternopil. The regional neighbors' games sometimes ended with disorders at the respective stadiums. The rivalry was part of the West Ukrainian football derby that after a while transferred from the Ukrainian Premier League to the Ukrainian First League.

The other rivalry worth mentioning was with FC Karpaty Lviv.

== League and cup history ==
=== Ukrainian SSR (Soviet Union) ===
Season	Div.	Pos.	Pl.	W	D	L	GS	GA	P	Domestic Cup	Coach	Top scorer	Notes
Spartak Ivano-Frankivsk
1969	3rd	1	40	20	17	3	52	21	57				Preserved place at the 3rd tier
1970	3rd	4	42	18	14	10	58	53	50				
1971	3rd	19	50	18	9	23	46	46	45				
1972	3rd	1	46	23	17	6	51	28	63				Promoted/Playoff won over Daugava Riga
1973	2nd	10	38	14	5/2	17	40	54	33				For draws, points were counted when won on penalty kicks
1974	2nd	12	38	9	16	13	37	39	34				
1975	2nd	12	38	14	7	17	50	48	35				
1976	2nd	14	38	13	10	15	47	53	36				
1977	2nd	14	38	10	14	14	38	52	34				
1978	2nd	15	38	13	6	19	43	58	32				
1979	2nd	14	46	19	7	20	52	61	45				
1980	2nd	17	46	16	10	20	54	67	42				
Prykarpattia Ivano-Frankivsk (part of Zenit sports society)
1981	2nd	20	46	14	13	19	44	56	40				Relegated
1982	3rd	13	46	17	8	21	41	58	42				
1983	3rd	22	50	17	6	27	54	76	40				
1984	3rd	9	36	14	8	14	31	36	36				2 stages
1985	3rd	19	40	14	10	16	42	42	38				2 stages
1986	3rd	17	40	12	16	12	41	46	40				2 stages
1987	3rd	3	52	29	10	13	69	41	68				
1988	3rd	17	50	15	19	16	51	47	49				
1989	3rd	21	52	16	12	24	51	68	44				Relegated
Prykarpattia Ivano-Frankivsk became professional club
1990	4th	7	36	15	8	13	32	32	38				
1991	4th	2	50	31	9	10	86	43	71				Admitted to Ukrainian competitions

=== Ukraine ===
Season	Div.	Pos.	Pl.	W	D	L	GS	GA	P	Domestic Cup	Coach	Top scorer	Notes
Prykarpattia Ivano-Frankivsk
1992	1st "B"	9	18	3	6	9	9	18	12	1/32 finals	Krasnetsky; Shuliatytsky	Shuliatytsky	Relegated
1992–93	2nd	5	42	18	14	10	53	35	50	1/8 finals			
1993–94	2nd	1	38	26	7	5	81	33	59	1/16 finals			Promoted
1994–95	1st	11	34	11	8	15	40	52	41	1/32 finals	Yurchenko	Yurchenko	
1995–96	1st	11	34	12	8	14	49	49	44	1/16 finals	Yurchenko	Rusak; Iriychuk	
1996–97	1st	13	30	8	7	15	33	49	31	1/16 finals	Streltsov; Kolotov	Zavyalov	
1997–98	1st	10	30	8	9	13	33	41	33	1/16 finals	Yurchenko; Blavatsky	Rusak	
1998–99	1st	15	30	6	6	18	24	59	24	1/8 finals	4 coaches	Shumsky	
1999-00	1st	14	30	7	8	15	27	47	29	1/16 finals	3 coaches	Spivak	Relegated
2000–01	2nd	14	34	12	6	16	36	46	42	1/16 finals			
2001–02	2nd	5	34	17	10	7	43	33	58	1/16 finals			
2002–03	2nd	17	34	7	8	19	25	54	29	1/32 finals			Club was reorganized
Spartak Ivano-Frankivsk
2003–04	2nd	4	34	15	10	9	42	38	59	1/8 finals			Renamed
2004–05	2nd	4	34	15	5	14	34	33	50	1/16 finals			
2005–06	2nd	10	34	10	15	9	33	31	45	1/16 finals			
2006–07	2nd	17	36	10	3	23	24	51	33	1/32 finals			Bankrupted

== See also ==
- FSC Prykarpattya Ivano-Frankivsk
- Ivano-Frankivsk Oblast Football Federation
