= Anatoliy Lebid =

Soviet footballer and coach

Personal information
- Full name: Anatoliy Hryhorovych Lebid
- Date of birth: 8 September 1944 (age 82)
- Place of birth: Kherson, Ukrainian SSR, Soviet Union
- Height: 1.80 m (5 ft 11 in)
- Position: Forward

Senior career*
Years	Team	Apps	(Gls)
1963–1964	FC Budivelnyk Kherson	36	(13)
1965	FC Bukovyna Chernivtsi	5	(0)
1965	FC Avanhard Kharkiv	14	(2)
1966–1967	FC Zorya Luhansk	32	(3)
1967–1968	FC Zirka Kirovohrad	40	(8)
1968–1974	FC Lokomotyv Kherson	47+	(74)
1975	FC Tytan Armyansk		
1977–1978	FC Kolos Skadovsk		

Managerial career
- 1977–1983: FC Kolos Skadovsk
- 1984: FC Krystal Kherson (ass't)
- 1992–1994: FC Krystal Kherson
- * Club domestic league appearances and goals

Anatoliy Lebid (Ukrainian: Анатолій Григорович Лебідь; 8 September 1944) is a former professional Soviet football forward and coach.

Lebid played seven games in the Soviet Top League for FC Zorya Luhansk in 1967.

His son, Vladimir Lebed, played for the Russia national football team.
