= Ihor Volkov =

Ukrainian association football player

Personal information
- Full name: Ihor Mykolayovych Volkov
- Date of birth: 13 March 1965 (age 61)
- Place of birth: Simferopol, Crimea Oblast, Ukrainian SSR
- Position: Defender

Senior career*
Years	Team	Apps	(Gls)
1982–1986	Tavriya Simferopol	99	(2)
1986	→ Tytan Armiansk (loan)		
1987–1988	Okean Kerch	60	(1)
1988–1997	Tavriya Simferopol	298	(20)
1997–1998	Mykolaiv	36	(9)
1998	Elektrometalurh-NZF Nikopol	6	(1)
1999–2002	Sibiryak Bratsk	91	(2)

Managerial career
- 2002–2005: Tavriya Simferopol (assistant)
- 2006–2007: Krymteplytsia Molodizhne (assistant)
- 2008: Feniks-Illichovets Kalinine (assistant)
- 2009–2015: YuIS-Servis Simferopol
- * Club domestic league appearances and goals

Ihor Mykolayovych Volkov (Ukrainian: Ігор Миколайович Волков; born 13 March 1965) is a Ukrainian football manager and former footballer.

== Early life ==
Volkov is a native of Simferopol, Crimea Oblast, Ukrainian SSR.

== Career ==
In 1989, Volkov returned to Ukrainian side Tavriya Simferopol, helping the club win their first league title and becoming captain of the team. He has been the player with the most all-time appearances for Tavriya.

== Style of play ==
Volkov mainly operated as a defender and was known for his work ethic.

== Managerial career ==
After retiring from professional football, Volkov worked as a manager.
