= Andriy Cheremysin =

Soviet footballer and Ukrainian coach

Personal information
- Full name: Andriy Andriyovych Cheremysin
- Date of birth: 23 April 1947 (age 79)
- Place of birth: Krasnodar, Russian SFSR
- Position: Midfielder

Senior career*
| Years | Team | Apps | (Gls) |
| 1967–1968 | Spartak Nalchik | 59 | (11) |
| 1969–1980 | Tavriya Simferopol | 357 | (76) |
| 1970 | → Shakhtar Donetsk (loan) | 6 | (0) |

Managerial career
- 1989–1990: SC Tavriya Simferopol (assistant)
- 1990: SC Tavriya Simferopol
- 1991–1993: SC Tavriya Simferopol (assistant)
- 1994: SC Tavriya Simferopol
- 2000: FC Polissya Zhytomyr (assistant)
- ????–2014: Tavriya Simferopol academy (staff)
- * Club domestic league appearances and goals

Andriy Andriyovych Cheremysin (born 23 April 1947 in Krasnodar) is a former Soviet football player and a Ukrainian football coach.

In 1980s Cheremysin supposedly played for some amateur club out of Simferopol. He also has two older brother and a son who all play football.
