= Ihor Yurchenko =

Ukrainian footballer

Personal information
- Full name: Ihor Mykolayovych Yurchenko
- Date of birth: 5 September 1960 (age 66)
- Place of birth: Stanislav, Ukraine, Soviet Union
- Height: 1.84 m (6 ft 1/2 in)
- Position: Midfielder

Youth career
- Spartak youth school (Ivano-Frankivsk)

Senior career*
Years	Team	Apps	(Gls)
1977–1978	Spartak Ivano-Frankivsk	18	(1)
1979–1980	SKA Rostov-na-Donu	13	(0)
1981	Prykarpattia Ivano-Frankivsk	40	(3)
1982–1984	Shakhtar Donetsk	73	(9)
1985–1986	Chornomorets Odessa	36	(6)
1987	Prykarpattia Ivano-Frankivsk	?	(?)
1988–1989	SKA Karpaty Lviv	41	(5)
1989	Chornomorets Odessa	3	(0)
1990–1995	Prykarpattia Ivano-Frankivsk	?	(?)

Managerial career
- 1993–1996: Prykarpattia Ivano-Frankivsk
- 1997: Prykarpattia Ivano-Frankivsk
- 1998–1999: Nyva Ternopil
- 2003: Prykarpattia Ivano-Frankivsk
- 2005: Spartak Ivano-Frankivsk (women)
- 2006: Prykarpattia Ivano-Frankivsk
- 2007: Naftokhimik Kalush (women)
- * Club domestic league appearances and goals

Ihor Mykolayovych Yurchenko (Ukrainian: Ігор Миколайович Юрченко; born in 5/9/1960) is the Soviet and Ukrainian professional footballer known for his performance in the Ukrainian club Prykarpattia Ivano-Frankivsk. Ihor has a younger brother Mykola Yurchenko whose name is also tightly intertwined with the fate of the western Ukrainian club.

== Playing career ==
He made his professional debut in the tournament for Spartak Ivano-Frankivsk in 1977. Throughout of his career played for different clubs of the Soviet Top League such as Shakhtar Donetsk, SKA Rostov-na-Donu, and Chornomorets Odessa. With the fall of the Soviet Union Yurchenko was on the roster of the football club Prykarpattia which was placed in the Ukrainian Premier League in 1992 after finishing second in the Soviet fourth division. He stayed with the club before its return to the Premiers after the 1994–95 season, becoming the playing coach for the team. Yurchenko soon after the club secured its place in the top league retired as a player continuing to coach the club from Ivano-Frankivsk. Later in his coaching career he managed Nyva Ternopil.

== Honours ==
- Ukrainian First League champion.
- Ukrainian Women's Top League champion.
