= SC Tavriya Simferopol =

Crimean football club (1958–2014)

SC Tavriya
- Full name: Sports Club Tavriya
- Nickname: Tatars
- Founded: 1958, 2016
- Dissolved: 2014, 2022
- Ground: Marianivka Stadium, Marianivka; Mashynobudivnyk Stadium, Beryslav (RSC Lokomotyv), (Note: temporarily inaccessible, due to the Annexation of Crimea by the Russian Federation) Simferopol
- Capacity: 19,978 (RSC Lokomotyv)
- Chairman: Serhiy Kunitsyn
- League: Ukrainian Second League
- 2021–22: 5th, Group B
- Website: tavriya.com.ua
| Home colours | Away colours |

Sports Club Tavriya (Ukrainian: Спортивний клуб "Таврія") was a Ukrainian football club from Simferopol. Tavriya was a member of the Ukrainian Premier League from its founding and won the first Ukrainian Premier League making them one of three teams that have ever held this title.

After the annexation of Crimea by the Russian Federation in 2014, the club was forced to cease its existence after 56 years, while in occupied Crimean peninsula a new club composed of some of its staff and players joined the Russian Football Union under the new name FC TSK Simferopol.

In June 2015, the Football Federation of Ukraine and the Tavriya's president announced it would re-establish the club and its new home would be Kherson. On 29 August 2016, club was added to Group 2 of the 2016–17 Ukrainian Football Amateur League. The revamped club is based in Beryslav, Kherson oblast.

Prior to the start of the 2020–21 Ukrainian Second League the club merged with FC Tavriya Novotroitske, this fusion continued to play under the original name of SC Tavriya Simferopol (in the 2020–21 Ukrainian Second League season).

At the start of the Russian invasion of Ukraine in 2022, they were based in Nova Kakhovka. On 28 March 2022, Tavriya ceased club activities following the occupation of Kherson Oblast.

== History ==
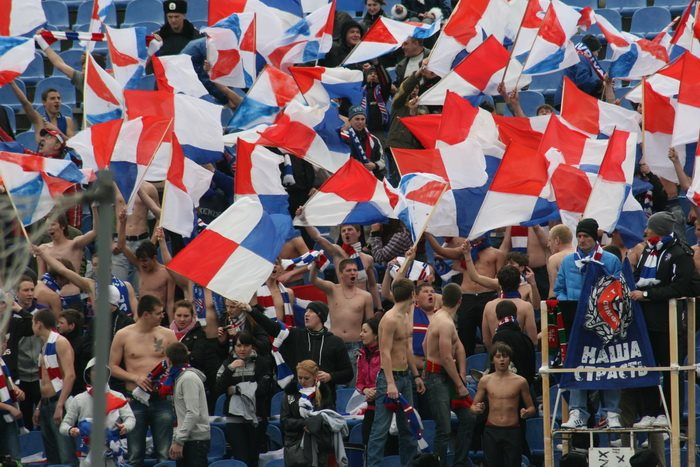
Tavriya fans in 2011

The club was formed in 1958, under the name Avanhard Simferopol and was based on the former Crimean champion 'Burevestnik Simferopol'. In previous season Burevestnik played in the 1957 Football Championship of the Ukrainian SSR and placed only 5th among 6 teams in its group. Nonetheless, Simferopol was granted to present its own football team at the all-Union football competitions next season. The newly formed football team was one of 32 football teams that were admitted to the All-Union football competitions in Class B in 1958 and one out of 8 from Ukraine. Tavriya played their first game in the 1958 Soviet Class B against the Yaroslav based club Khimik. Sometime in 1963, Avanhard changed its name to Tavriya. The team was a member of the bigger Soviet Lokomotiv sports society for railway workers (Cisdnieper Railways). In 1967 for Tavriya in Simferopol was built a new stadium. Overall, Tavriya played 132 clubs from 113 cities. They played their last match of the Soviet competition against FC Uralmash Yekaterinburg.

After the fall of the Soviet Union, the Ukrainian Premier League was formed. Tavria was one of its founders and eventually became the very first Ukrainian champion in 1992, under the Simferopol born manager Anatoliy Zayaev, defeating FC Dynamo Kyiv, Ukraine's most successful club in the final, held in Lviv. Yuriy Hudymenko became the league's top scorer. More players from that era were Oleksandr Holovko, a defender who also played many years for Ukraine national team, and captain Serhiy Yakovych Shevchenko, who scored the championship goal against Dynamo Kyiv. Having earned the right to participate in 1992–93 UEFA Champions League, Tavryia were knocked out in the first round by Swiss club FC Sion. The Russian Sport-Express posted an article (No.3 (43), 25 January 2000, page 9) stating that the Ukrainian champions Tavria were threatened by the Football Federation of Ukraine to compete at the CIS Cup in 1993.

Tavria was one of the five clubs to have until 2014 participated in every season of the Ukrainian Premier League. Their best performance in the Ukrainian Cup came in 2010, where they defeated FC Metalurh Donetsk in the final to win the competition. They had previously reached the final in 1994, where they lost to FC Chornomorets Odesa in a penalty shootout.

=== Russian annexation of Crimea ===
After the annexation of Crimea by Russia, Tavriya asked permission from UEFA and FIFA to shift to the Russian league next season. The club applied for a Russian license and changed its name to FC TSK Simferopol. The club currently plays in the Crimean Premier League.

=== Re-establishment ===
On 18 June 2015, the Football Federation of Ukraine executive committee voted in favor of re-establishing the club now to be located in Kherson (the largest Ukrainian city bordering Crimea). Serhiy Kunitsyn, Tavriya's former president and also a former Prime Minister of Crimea, was put in charge of the project.

In August 2016, the revamped version of the club applied to play in the 2016–17 Ukrainian Football Amateur League. It did not enter this competition at first. However, Tavriya was included to group 2 of 2016–17 Ukrainian Football Amateur League on 29 August. Re-established club based in the city of Beryslav in Kherson Oblast.

In November 2016, the club applied for FFU attestation in order to achieve professional status in the next season. After finishing the 2016–17 season in the Amateur League, Tavriya was included into PFL and promoted to Ukrainian Second League in June 2017. The club was included to group B of 2017–18 Ukrainian Second League.

Prior to the start of the 2020–21 Ukrainian Second League the club merged with FC Tavriya Novotroitske, but continued to play under its original name.

On 28 March 2022 Tavriya ceased club activities after 2022 Russian invasion of Ukraine and subsequent temporary occupation of Kherson Oblast.

== Team names ==
- First club (1958–2014):
  - 1958–1962: Avanhard Simferopol
  - 1963–2014: SC Tavriya Simferopol
- Second club (2016–2022):
  - 2016–2022: SC Tavriya Simferopol

== European record ==
Champions League:

| Season | Round | Country | Club | Home | Away | Aggregate |
|---|---|---|---|---|---|---|
| 1992–93 | Qualifying | (Republic of Ireland) | Shelbourne | 2–1 | 0–0 | 2–1 |
| | 1st | (Switzerland) | Sion | 1–3 | 1–4 | 2–7 |

Europa League:

| Season | Round | Country | Club | Home | Away | Aggregate |
|---|---|---|---|---|---|---|
| 2010–11 | Play-off | (Germany) | Bayer Leverkusen | 1–3 | 0–3 | 1–6 |

Intertoto Cup:

| Season | Round | Country | Club | Home | Away | Aggregate |
|---|---|---|---|---|---|---|
| 2008 | 2nd | (Moldova) | Tiraspol | 3–1 | 0–0 | 3–1 |
| | 3rd | (France) | Stade Rennais | 1–0 | 0–1 | 1–1 (9–10 p) |

== Honours ==
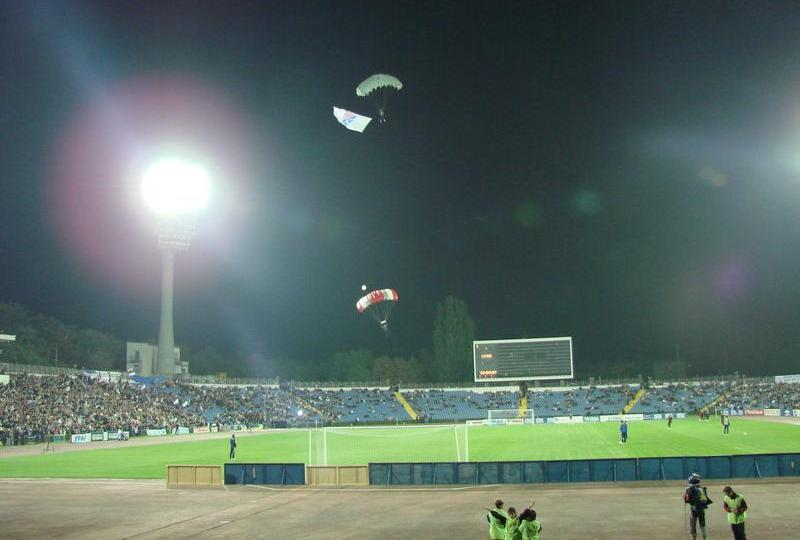
RSC Lokomotiv

- Ukrainian Premier League (1st Tier)

1992

- Ukrainian Cup

2009–10
1993–94

- Soviet First League (2nd Tier)

1980

- Championship of the Ukrainian SSR (Soviet Lower Tier)

1973, 1985, 1987
1986

- Cup of the Ukrainian SSR

1974
1975

== Football kits and sponsors ==
| Years | Football kit | Shirt sponsor |
|---|---|---|
| 1998–1999 | adidas | Aerosvit |
| 2000–2005 | adidas | – |
| 2005–2006 | adidas/umbro | CS |
| 2006–2007 | umbro | CS |
| 2007–2009 | adidas | Кліринговий Дім |
| 2009–2013 | umbro | Кліринговий Дім |
| 2012–2014 | puma | TITAN |

== Players ==
=== Current squad ===
As of 1 August 2023

Note: Flags indicate national team as defined under FIFA eligibility rules; some limited exceptions apply. Players may hold more than one non-FIFA nationality.

| No. | Pos. | Nation | Player |
|---|---|---|---|
| 1 | GK | UKR | Yaroslav Herasymenko |
| 2 | MF | UKR | Stanislav Zakharchenko |
| 4 | MF | UKR | Dmytro Klochko |
| 7 | MF | UKR | Maksym Bohdanov |
| 8 | MF | UKR | Yevhen Bilokin |
| 9 | FW | UKR | Oleksiy Boyko |
| 10 | FW | UKR | Andriy Barladym |
| 16 | MF | UKR | Mykhaylo Kryvych |
| 17 | DF | UKR | Pavlo Chmelenko |
| 18 | DF | UKR | Roman Bochak |

| No. | Pos. | Nation | Player |
|---|---|---|---|
| 19 | DF | UKR | Oleksandr Maksymenko |
| 21 | DF | UKR | Oleksiy Zayika |
| 22 | DF | UKR | Serhiy Chebotayev |
| 23 | MF | UKR | Andriy Kovalyov |
| 33 | GK | UKR | Vitaliy Onopko |
| 69 | DF | UKR | Ivan Hura |
| 73 | GK | UKR | Yehor Popovych |
| 99 | MF | UKR | Vladyslav Vakulinskyi |
| — | MF | UKR | Bohdan Khobta |
| — | FW | UKR | Serhiy Kravchenko |

== Coaches ==
- (Soviet Union) Valentin Bubukin (1970–72)
- (Soviet Union) Vadim Ivanov (1979)
- (Soviet Union) Anatoli Polosin (1980–81)
- (Soviet Union) Igor Volchok (1982)
- (Soviet Union) Anatoliy Kon'kov (1983–84)
- (Soviet Union) Gennady Logofet (1984)
- (Soviet Union) Anatoliy Kon'kov (1985)
- (Soviet Union) Anatoli Polosin (1986)
- (Soviet Union) Vyacheslav Solovyov (1987–88)
- (Ukraine) Mykola Pavlov (1989–90)
- (Ukraine) Anatoliy Zayaev (1991 – May 93)
- (Ukraine) (Federal Republic of Yugoslavia) Oleksandr Radosavlyevych (1993–94)
- (Ukraine) Pavlo Kostin (June 1994 – Sept 94)
- (Ukraine) Andriy Cheremysin (Oct 1994 – Dec 94)
- (Ukraine) Vitaliy Shalychev (Jan 1995 – April 95)
- (Ukraine) Ruvyn Aronov (caretaker) (1995)
- (Ukraine) Valeriy Shvedyuk (caretaker) (1995)
- (Ukraine) Anatoliy Zayaev (May 1995 – June 95)
- (Ukraine) Ivan Balan (July 1996 – Aug 96)
- (Ukraine) Serhiy Shevchenko (Aug 1996 – Dec 96)
- (Ukraine) Mykola Pavlov (Jan 1997 – April 97)
- (Ukraine) Valeriy Shvedyuk (1997)
- (Ukraine) Ivan Balan (caretaker) (May 1997 – June 97)
- (Ukraine) Ivan Balan (July 1997 – June 98)
- (Ukraine) Viktor Hrachov (July 1998 – Dec 98)
- (Ukraine) Valeriy Petrov (caretaker) (Jan 1999 – May 99)
- (Ukraine) Anatoly Korobochka (16 June 1999 – 31 December 1999)
- (Ukraine) Volodymyr Muntyan (1 Jan 2000 – 30 June 2000)
- (Ukraine) Oleksandr Ischenko (1 July 2000 – 10 June 2001)
- (Ukraine) Anatoliy Zayaev (June 2001)
- (Ukraine) Valeriy Petrov (caretaker) (10 June 2001 – 10 June 2002)
- (Ukraine) Anatoliy Zayaev (10 June 2002 – 20 September 2004)
- (Ukraine) Mykola Pavlov (2004)
- (Ukraine) Oleh Fedorchuk (20 September 2004 – 31 Dec 2005)
- (Ukraine) Mykhaylo Fomenko (1 Jan 2006 – 29 September 2008)
- (Ukraine) Serhiy Puchkov (29 September 2008 – 22 September 2010)
- (Ukraine) Valeriy Petrov (caretaker) (22 September 2010 – 8 May 2011)
- (Ukraine) Oleksandr Shudryk (caretaker) (May 2011 – 11 June)
- (Ukraine) Semen Altman (6 June 2011 – 1 June 2012)
- (Ukraine) Oleh Luzhnyi (6 June 2012 – 15 June 2013)
- (Greece) Giannis Christopoulos (17 June 2013 – 25 December 2013)
- (Bulgaria) Nikolai Kostov (4 Jan 2014 – 17 May 2014)
- none during the Russian annexation of Crimea (2014–2016)
- (Ukraine) Serhiy Shevchenko (August 2016 – December 2020)
- (Ukraine) Oleh Fedorchuk (January 2021 – 21 April 2021)
- (Ukraine) Yuriy Chumak (caretaker) (26 April 2021 – 10 June 2021)
- (Ukraine) Serhiy Puchkov (10 June 2021 – 14 September 2021)
- (Ukraine) Yuriy Chumak (caretaker) (14 September 2021 – 28 March 2022)

== League and cup history ==
=== Soviet Union ===
| Season | Div. | Pos. | Pl. | W | D | L | GS | GA | P | Domestic Cup | Europe | Notes |
|---|---|---|---|---|---|---|---|---|---|---|---|---|
Avangard / Avanhard
| 1958 | 2nd | 15 | 30 | 5 | 7 | 18 | 21 | 43 | 17 | Zone 2, 1/8 finals | | Zone 2 |
| 1959 | 2nd | 12 | 28 | 6 | 9 | 13 | 20 | 38 | 21 | Zone 4 1/2 finals | | Zone 4 |
| 1960 | 2nd | 11 | 36 | 12 | 8 | 16 | 42 | 55 | 32 | | | Zone 2 |
| 1961 | 2nd | 5 | 36 | 14 | 11 | 11 | 43 | 38 | 39 | 1/32 finals | | Zone 2 |
| 1961 | 2nd | 9 | 2 | 1 | 1 | 0 | 4 | 2 | 3 | 1/32 finals | | Places 9–10 |
| 1962 | 2nd | 2 | 24 | 12 | 7 | 5 | 34 | 17 | 31 | Ukraine 1/16 finals | | Zone 3 |
| 1962 | 2nd | 3 | 10 | 3 | 4 | 3 | 12 | 14 | 10 | Ukraine 1/16 finals | | Places 1–6; reorganization of competitions |
Tavriya
| 1963 | 3rd | 15 | 38 | 13 | 11 | 14 | 39 | 41 | 37 | Zone 2 1/2 finals | | Zone 2 |
| 1963 | 3rd | 30 | 2 | 1 | 0 | 1 | 1 | 6 | 2 | Zone 2 1/2 finals | | Places 29–30 |
| 1964 | 3rd | 1 | 30 | 16 | 10 | 4 | 43 | 20 | 42 | Zone 3 1/2 finals | | Zone 3 |
| 1964 | 3rd | 5 | 10 | 2 | 1 | 7 | 8 | 15 | 5 | Zone 3 1/2 finals | | Places 1–6 |
| 1965 | 3rd | 1 | 32 | 16 | 8 | 8 | 42 | 24 | 40 | Zone 3 final | | Zone 3 |
| 1965 | 3rd | 4 | 10 | 3 | 4 | 3 | 10 | 11 | 10 | Zone 3 final | | Places 1–6; promoted |
| 1966 | 2nd | 12 | 34 | 10 | 11 | 13 | 29 | 33 | 31 | 1/128 finals | | |
| 1967 | 2nd | 17 | 38 | 10 | 10 | 18 | 44 | 57 | 30 | 1/16 finals | | |
| 1968 | 2nd | 6 | 40 | 20 | 10 | 10 | 51 | 33 | 50 | 1/128 finals | | |
| 1969 | 2nd | 8 | 42 | 14 | 16 | 12 | 60 | 49 | 44 | 1/64 finals | | relegated |
| 1970 | 3rd | 2 | 42 | 21 | 15 | 6 | 70 | 36 | 57 | 1/16 finals | | |
| 1971 | 3rd | 5 | 50 | 24 | 11 | 15 | 79 | 50 | 59 | | | Championship of Ukraine |
| 1972 | 3rd | 3 | 46 | 25 | 7 | 14 | 62 | 32 | 57 | | | Championship of Ukraine |
| 1973 | 3rd | 1 | 44 | 26 | 6 | 12 | 75 | 36 | 58 | | | Champion of Ukraine |
| 1973 | 3rd | 2 | 6 | 4 | 0 | 2 | 13 | 6 | 8 | | | interzonal tournament, promoted |
| 1974 | 2nd | 6 | 38 | 18 | 6 | 14 | 74 | 55 | 42 | 1/16 finals | | |
| 1975 | 2nd | 7 | 38 | 17 | 8 | 13 | 58 | 46 | 42 | 1/16 finals | | |
| 1976 | 2nd | 4 | 38 | 17 | 12 | 9 | 59 | 32 | 46 | 1/8 finals | | |
| 1977 | 2nd | 3 | 38 | 21 | 7 | 10 | 57 | 34 | 49 | 1/32 finals | | |
| 1978 | 2nd | 8 | 38 | 14 | 12 | 12 | 48 | 38 | 40 | 1/32 finals | | |
| 1979 | 2nd | 18 | 46 | 16 | 11 | 19 | 50 | 56 | 43 | Group stage | | |
| 1980 | 2nd | 1 | 46 | 28 | 9 | 9 | 82 | 42 | 65 | 1/8 finals | | promoted |
| 1981 | 1st | 17 | 34 | 8 | 7 | 19 | 27 | 54 | 23 | Group stage | | relegated |
| 1982 | 2nd | 13 | 42 | 17 | 7 | 18 | 58 | 50 | 41 | 1/4 finals | | |
| 1983 | 2nd | 7 | 42 | 16 | 12 | 14 | 78 | 67 | 44 | 1/16 finals | | |
| 1984 | 2nd | 21 | 42 | 12 | 11 | 19 | 43 | 58 | 35 | 1/16 finals | | relegated |
| 1985 | 3rd | 1 | 26 | 17 | 5 | 4 | 49 | 19 | 39 | 1/64 finals | | |
| 1985 | 3rd | 1 | 14 | 7 | 7 | 0 | 32 | 21 | 21 | 1/64 finals | | Champion of Ukraine |
| 1985 | 3rd | 2 | 6 | 3 | 1 | 2 | 11 | 7 | 7 | 1/64 finals | | interzonal tournament |
| 1986 | 3rd | 1 | 26 | 14 | 10 | 2 | 68 | 23 | 38 | 1/64 finals | | |
| 1986 | 3rd | 2 | 14 | 8 | 5 | 1 | 34 | 23 | 21 | 1/64 finals | | Championship of Ukraine runner up |
| 1987 | 3rd | 1 | 52 | 34 | 12 | 6 | 125 | 48 | 80 | 1/2 finals | | Champion of Ukraine |
| 1987 | 3rd | 1 | 4 | 2 | 1 | 1 | 15 | 7 | 5 | 1/2 finals | | interzonal tournament, promoted |
| 1988 | 2nd | 14 | 42 | 13 | 14 | 15 | 34 | 43 | 38 | 1/64 finals | | |
| 1989 | 2nd | 6 | 42 | 18 | 12 | 12 | 61 | 50 | 48 | 1/64 finals | | |
| 1990 | 2nd | 9 | 38 | 11 | 16 | 11 | 40 | 38 | 38 | 1/64 finals | | |
| 1991 | 2nd | 6 | 42 | 19 | 10 | 13 | 64 | 56 | 48 | 1/16 finals | | |
| 1992 | No competition | | | | | | | | | 1/64 finals | | |

=== Ukraine ===
| Season | Div. | Pos. | Pl. | W | D | L | GS | GA | P | Domestic Cup | Europe | | Notes |
|---|---|---|---|---|---|---|---|---|---|---|---|---|---|
| 1992 | 1st (Top League) | 1 | 18 | 11 | 6 | 1 | 30 | 9 | 28 | 1/16 finals | | | |
| 1992–93 | 1st (Top League) | 10 | 30 | 11 | 4 | 15 | 30 | 39 | 26 | 1/8 finals | ECL | 1st round | |
| 1993–94 | 1st (Top League) | 8 | 34 | 12 | 10 | 12 | 41 | 34 | 34 | Runner-up | | | |
| 1994–95 | 1st (Top League) | 5 | 34 | 17 | 8 | 9 | 61 | 37 | 59 | 1/2 finals | | | |
| 1995–96 | 1st (Top League) | 12 | 34 | 12 | 8 | 14 | 46 | 46 | 44 | 1/4 finals | | | |
| 1996–97 | 1st (Top League) | 6 | 30 | 13 | 5 | 12 | 36 | 46 | 44 | 1/16 finals | | | |
| 1997–98 | 1st (Top League) | 14 | 30 | 8 | 9 | 13 | 35 | 41 | 33 | 1/8 finals | | | |
| 1998–99 | 1st (Top League) | 9 | 30 | 10 | 7 | 13 | 33 | 39 | 37 | 1/4 finals | | | |
| 1999–00 | 1st (Top League) | 13 | 30 | 7 | 8 | 15 | 32 | 51 | 29 | 1/8 finals | | | |
| 2000–01 | 1st (Top League) | 7 | 26 | 8 | 9 | 9 | 24 | 31 | 33 | 1/8 finals | | | |
| 2001–02 | 1st (Top League) | 7 | 26 | 8 | 6 | 12 | 27 | 36 | 30 | 1/8 finals | | | |
| 2002–03 | 1st (Top League) | 9 | 30 | 9 | 7 | 14 | 36 | 50 | 34 | 1/16 finals | | | |
| 2003–04 | 1st (Top League) | 12 | 30 | 7 | 11 | 12 | 26 | 40 | 32 | 1/4 finals | | | |
| 2004–05 | 1st (Top League) | 7 | 30 | 11 | 9 | 10 | 34 | 28 | 42 | 1/4 finals | | | |
| 2005–06 | 1st (Top League) | 7 | 30 | 11 | 6 | 13 | 29 | 31 | 39 | 1/8 finals | | | |
| 2006–07 | 1st (Top League) | 5 | 30 | 12 | 6 | 12 | 32 | 30 | 42 | 1/2 finals | | | |
| 2007–08 | 1st (Top League) | 5 | 30 | 13 | 8 | 9 | 38 | 40 | 47 | 1/4 finals | | | |
| 2008–09 | 1st (Premier League) | 8 | 30 | 10 | 7 | 13 | 41 | 45 | 37 | 1/4 finals | IC | 3rd round | |
| 2009–10 | 1st (Premier League) | 6 | 30 | 12 | 9 | 9 | 38 | 38 | 45 | Winner | | | |
| 2010–11 | 1st (Premier League) | 7 | 30 | 10 | 9 | 11 | 44 | 46 | 39 | 1/16 finals | EL | Play-off Round | |
| 2011–12 | 1st (Premier League) | 6 | 30 | 12 | 9 | 9 | 43 | 36 | 45 | 1/16 finals | | | |
| 2012–13 | 1st (Premier League) | 11 | 30 | 10 | 5 | 15 | 27 | 46 | 32 | 1/4 finals | | | 3 points deducted |
| 2013–14 | 1st (Premier League) | 15 | 28 | 2 | 4 | 22 | 15 | 46 | 10 | 1/16 finals | | | Expelled |
in 2014 the club was forced to be dissolved due to the Annexation of Crimea by the Russian Federation. In 2016 it was revived in Kherson Oblast.
| 2016–17 | 4th (Championship among amateurs) | 9 | 20 | 6 | 6 | 8 | 31 | 37 | 24 | | | | Promoted |
| 2017–18 | 3rd "B" | 4 | 33 | 18 | 7 | 8 | 59 | 33 | 61 | 1/32 finals | | | |
| 2018–19 | 3rd "B" | 7 | 27 | 6 | 12 | 9 | 30 | 35 | 30 | 1/32 finals | | | |
| 2019–20 | 3rd "B" | 8 | 20 | 5 | 2 | 13 | 12 | 32 | 17 | 1/32 finals | | | |
| 2020–21 | 3rd "B" | 4 | 22 | 12 | 6 | 4 | 41 | 22 | 42 | 1/32 finals | | | |
| 2021–22 | 3rd "B" | 5 | 19 | 9 | 6 | 4 | 28 | 19 | 33 | 1/16 finals | | | Withdrew |

== Notable foreign players ==
- (Serbia) Damir Kahriman
- (Sweden) Gustav Svensson
- (North Macedonia) Boban Grncarov
- (Portugal) Nuno Pinto
- (Croatia) Marin Ljubicic
- (Argentina) Rubén Gomez
- (Portugal) David Caiado
- (Romania) Lucian Burdujan
- (Nigeria) Dele Adeleye
- (Tunisia) Anis Boussaidi
- (Brazil) Célio Santos
- (Brazil) Eduardo Neto
- (Ivory Coast) Marco Né
- (Serbia) Slobodan Markovic
- (Croatia) Sasa Djuricic
- (Serbia) Zeljko Ljubenovic
- (Slovakia) Frantisek Kubik
- (Nigeria) Lucky Idahor
- (Nigeria) Fanendo Adi
- (North Macedonia) Besart Ibraimi
- (Serbia) Sasa Todic
- (Lithuania) Andrius Joksas
- (Lithuania) Vidas Alunderis
- (Poland) Pawel Hajduczek
- (Nigeria) Harrison Omokoh
- (Georgia (country)) Vasil Gigiadze
- (Montenegro) Dušan Lagator
- (Montenegro) Vukašin Poleksić
- (Nigeria) Hamzat Ojediran
- (Romania) Liviu Goian
- (Romania) Tibor Selymes
- (Romania) Nicolae Ilea
- (Romania) Marius Șumudică
- (Romania) Sabin Ilie
- (Senegal) Ibrahima Sidibe
- (Serbia) Igor Bogdanović
- (Serbia) Dragan Vukmir
- (Serbia) Nenad Novaković
- (Serbia) Dušan Brković
- (Slovakia) Róbert Vittek
- (Slovenia) Dalibor Volaš
- (Slovenia) Rene Mihelič
- 1992 SC Tavriya Simferopol season
