= Ukrainians on the Soviet Union national football team =

Consistent football competitions were taken place in Ukraine in the beginning of the 20th century when the modern country was divided between Hungary, Poland, Romania, and Russia. The most progressive league where Ukrainians participated were Polish and USSR championships (Dinamo Kyiv is known worldwide).

In the 1970s and 1980s, the backbone of the Soviet Union national football team were players out of the Dinamo Kyiv's first team while the team was also coached by the Kievan native and the Dinamo Kyiv franchise person -- Valery Lobanovsky. Oleh Blokhin, another Kievan native and the legendary Ukrainian player and coach, became the USSR national team leader in games participated and goals scored for the team. He reflected the mentorship of his coach, Valery Lobanovsky, and extending the long possessing football traditions of his native country by taking the Ukraine national team to quarter finals of the World Cup in 2006. Football Federation of Ukraine (FFU) was created and recognized by FIFA only in 1992. That led several players played for the Ukraine national team in 1993 to reconsider their choice by choosing their opportunities in more successful team of Russian Federation which was considered as the successor of the Soviet national team with all its success. By recognizing only the Russian team as the successor many Russian statisticians are advocating that as the main reason to consider the Ukrainian born footballers that played for the Soviet team to be Russians. The players such as Andrei Kanchelskis and Sergei Yuran are not included in the list for the reason choosing to play for the Russian team over the Ukrainian. Note that there are no Viktor Onopko or Andrei Karyaka as well, although the last one played several games for the junior squad of the national team.

While waiting for recognition from FIFA in 1992, the national team of Ukraine failed to gain to be seeded on time for the World Cup qualification competition from Europe.

== List of Soviet Ukrainians ==
Name	Years of life	Place of birth/death	Caps	Goals	Comments
Oleh Blokhin	1952–present	Kyiv, Ukrainian SSR -	112	42
Anatoliy Demyanenko	1959–present	Dnipropetrovsk, Ukrainian SSR -	80	6
Volodymyr Bezsonov	1958–present	Kharkiv, Ukrainian SSR -	79	4
Oleh Protasov	1964–present	Dnipropetrovsk, Ukrainian SSR -	68/1	29/0
Oleh Kuznetsov	1963–present	Magdeburg, East Germany -	63/3	1/0
Volodymyr Kaplychnyi	1944 – 2004	Kamianets-Podilskyi, Ukrainian SSR - Kyiv, Ukraine	62	0
Hennadiy Lytovchenko	1963–present	Dniprodzerzhinsk, Ukrainian SSR -	58/4	15/0
Viktor Kolotov	1949 – 2000	Yudino, Tatar ASSR, Russian SFSR - Kyiv, Ukraine	54	22
Leonid Buryak	1953–present	Odesa, Ukrainian SSR -	53	10
Volodymyr Muntyan	1946–2025	Kotovsk, Ukrainian SSR -	49	7
Yevhen Rudakov	1942–2011	Moscow, Russian SFSR - Kyiv, Ukraine	48	0
Anatoliy Konkov	1949–2024	Krasnyi Luch, Ukrainian SSR -	47	8
Vasyl Rats	1961–present	Fanchykovo, Ukrainian SSR -	47	4
Serhiy Baltacha	1958–present	Zhdanov, Ukrainian SSR -	45	2
Volodymyr Onyshchenko	1949–present	Stechanka, Chornobyl Raion, Ukrainian SSR -	44	11
Oleksiy Mykhaylychenko	1963–present	Kyiv, Ukrainian SSR -	41/2	9/0
Oleksandr Zavarov	1961–present	Luhansk, Ukrainian SSR -	41	6
Yozhef Sabo	1940–present	Ungvár, Kingdom of Hungary -	40	8
Anatoliy Byshovets	1946–present	Kyiv, Ukrainian SSR -	39	15
Yuriy Istomin	1944 - 1999	Kharkiv, Ukrainian SSR - Moscow, Russia	34	0
Ihor Belanov	1960–present	Odesa, Ukrainian SSR -	33	8
Volodymyr Troshkin	1947–2020	Yenakiieve, Ukrainian SSR -	31	1
Volodymyr Veremeyev	1946–present	Spassk-Dalny, Russian SFSR -	26	2
Yuriy Voynov	1931 – 2003	Kalininsky, Russian SFSR - Kyiv, Ukraine	26	5
Akhrik Tsveiba	1966–present	Gudauta, Georgian SSR -	25/1	2/0	8 games played for Russia
Mykhaylo Fomenko	1948 – 2024	Mala Rybytsia, Sumy Oblast, Ukrainian SSR -	24	0
Viktor Matviyenko	1948 – 2018	Zaporizhzhia, Ukrainian SSR - Kyiv, Ukraine	21	0
Viktor Serebryanikov	1940 – 2014	Zaporizhzhia, Ukrainian SSR - Kyiv, Ukraine	21	3
Viktor Chanov	1959 – 2017	Donetsk, Ukrainian SSR - Kyiv, Ukraine	21	0
Andriy Bal	1958 – 2014	Rozdil, Ukrainian SSR - Kyiv, Ukraine	20	1
Vitaliy Khmelnytskyi	1943 – 2019	Tymoshivka, Orikhiv Raion, Zaporizhzhia Oblast, Ukrainian SSR - Kyiv, Ukraine	20	7
Sergey Shavlo	1956–present	Nikopol, Ukrainian SSR -	19	1
Pavlo Yakovenko	1964–present	Nikopol, Ukrainian SSR -	19	1
Ivan Yaremchuk	1962–present	Velykyi Bychkiv, Ukrainian SSR -	18	2
Yuriy Dehteryov	1948 – 2022	Stalino, Ukrainian SSR - Donetsk, Ukraine	17	0
Stefan Reshko	1947–present	Kliucharky, Ukrainian SSR -	15	0
Viktor Bannikov	1938 – 2001	Luhyny, Ukrainian SSR - Kyiv, Ukraine	14	0
Oleksandr Berezhnyi	1957–present	Sukhodilsk, Ukrainian SSR -	14	0
Anatoliy Puzach	1941 - 2006	Krasnyi Kut, Russian SFSR - Kyiv, Ukraine	14	2
Viktor Zvyagintsev	1950–present	Donetsk, Ukrainian SSR -	13	1
Vadym Yevtushenko	1958–present	Pyatikhatky, Ukrainian SSR -	12	1
Vladimir Pilguy	1948–present	Dnipropetrovsk, Ukrainian SSR -	12	0
Vyacheslav Semyonov	1947–present	Kyiv, Ukrainian SSR -	11	4
Leonid Ostrovskiy	1936 – 2001	Riga, Latvia - Kyiv, Ukraine	9	0
Viktor Kuznetsov	1949–present	Kamenolomnia, Crimea, Russian SFSR -	8	0
Anatoliy Kuksov	1949–present	Luhansk, Ukrainian SSR -	8	0
Valeriy Porkujan	1944–present	Kirovohrad, Ukrainian SSR -	8	4
Viktor Pasulko	1961–present	Ilnytsia, Ukrainian SSR -	8	1
Vadym Tyshchenko	1963–present	Horodok, Ukrainian SSR -	8	0
Oleh Luzhnyi	1968–present	Lviv, Ukrainian SSR -	8/52	0/0
Yuri Susloparov	1958 – 2012	Kharkiv, Ukrainian SSR - Istrinsky District, Moscow, Russia	7	0
Fedir Medvid	1943 – 1997	Novo-Davydkove, Ukrainian SSR - Kyiv, Ukraine	7	2
Vladimir Liuty	1962–present	Dnipropetrovsk, Ukrainian SSR -	6	1
Ivan Vyshnevskyi	1957 – 1996	Salavat, Bashkir ASSR, Russian SFSR - Dnipropetrovsk, Ukraine	6	0
Eduard Kozinkevich	1949 – 1994	Lviv, Ukrainian SSR - Lviv, Ukraine	6	1
Viktor Kanevski	1936 – 2018	Kyiv, Ukrainian SSR - Bristol, Connecticut, US	5	0
Ivan Hetsko	1968–present	Dnipropetrovsk, Ukrainian SSR -	5/4	0/1
Yuri Romensky	1952–present	Minchegavir, Azerbaijan SSR -?	5
Volodymyr Lozynskyi	1955–present	Bryansk Oblast, Russian SFSR - ?	4	0
Yuri Nikiforov	1970–present	Odesa, Ukrainian SSR -	4/3	0/0	55 games for Russia, 6 goals
Oleh Rodin	1956–present	Moscow, Russian SFSR -	4	0
Vadym Sosnikhin	1942 – 2003	Kyiv, Ukrainian SSR - Kyiv, Ukraine	4	0
Stepan Yurchyshyn	1957–present	Kernitsa, Ukrainian SSR -	4	1
Oleksandr Zhuravliov	1945–present	Voroshylovhrad, Ukrainian SSR -	3	0
Viktor Fomin	1929 – 2007	Sloviansk, Ukrainian SSR - Ukraine	3	0
Serhiy Kuznetsov	1950–present	Kamenolomnia, Crimea, Ukrainian SSR -	3	0
Vladimir Levchenko	1944 – 2006	Kyiv, Ukrainian SSR - Kyiv, Ukraine	3	0
Volodymyr Malygin	1949–present	Voroshilovsk, Ukrainian SSR -	3	0
Oleksandr Tkachenko	1947–present	Kupiansk, Ukrainian SSR -	3	0
Serhiy Shmatovalenko	1967–present	Odesa, Ukrainian SSR -	2/8	0/0
Mykola Fedorenko	1955–present	Ordzhonikidze, Ukrainian SSR -	2	1
Volodymyr Dudarenko	1946 – 2017	Rivne, Ukrainian SSR - Rivne, Ukraine	2	0
Yozhef Betsa	1929 – 2011	Mukachevo, Czechoslovakia - Mukachevo, Ukraine	2	0
Ihor Kulchytsky	1941–present	Lviv, Ukrainian SSR -	2	0
Valeriy Lobanovskyi	1939–2002	Kyiv, Ukrainian SSR - Zaporizhya, Ukraine	2	0
Petro Slobodian	1953–present	Kolomea Raion, Ukrainian SSR -	2	0
Oleksiy Cherednyk	1960–present	Stalinabad, Tajik SSR -	2	0
Leonid Shmuts	1948–present	Nikopol, Ukrainian SSR -	2	0
Evgeni Jarovenko	1963–present	Karatau, Djambul, Kazakh SSR -	2	0
Andriy Biba	1938–present	Kyiv, Ukrainian SSR -	1	0
Lev Brovarsky	1948 – 2009	Drohobych, Ukrainian SSR - Lviv, Ukraine	1	0
Valeri Gorbunov	1953–1996	Horlivka, Ukrainian SSR - Horlivka, Ukraine	1	0
Viktor Grachyov	1956–present	Dzerzhinsk, Ukrainian SSR -	1	0
Viktor Kaplun	1958–present	Zaporizhia, Ukrainian SSR -	1	0
Valeri Zuyev	1952–present	Kyiv, Ukrainian SSR -	1	0
Mykhailo Forkash	1948–present	Uzhhorod, Ukrainian SSR -	1	0
Oleh Makarov	1929 – 1995	Rubtsovsk, Altai, Russian SFSR - Kiev, Ukraine	1	0
Serhiy Morozov	1950–present	Sverdlovsk, Russian SFSR -	1	0
Mykola Pinchuk	1946–present	Tikhoretsk, Russian SFSR -	1	0
Ivan Privalov	1902–1974	Kharkiv, Russian Empire - Kharkiv, Ukrainian SSR	1	0
Oleksandr Shpakovsky	1899–1942	Kharkiv, Russian Empire - GULAG, Khabarovsk, Russian SFSR	1	1
Anatoliy Shepel	1949–present	Kyiv, Ukrainian SSR -	1	0
Anatoliy Shulzhenko	1945 – 1997	Voroshylovhrad, Ukrainian SSR - Luhansk, Ukraine	1	0
Viacheslav Leshchuk	1951–present	Bilhorod-Dnistrovskyi, Ukrainian SSR -	1	0
Viktor Lysenko	1947 -–2003	Mykolaiv, Ukrainian SSR - Mykolaiv, Ukraine	1	0
Mykola Pavlov	1954–present	Kyiv, Ukrainian SSR -	1	0
Vyacheslav Chanov	1951–present	Moscow, Russian SFSR -	1	0

Unofficial games

Name	Years of life	Place of birth/death	Caps	Goals	Comments
Kostyantyn Fomin	1903–1964		10	0	(Dynamo Kharkiv → Dynamo Kyiv)
Viktor Shylovsky	1911 – 1973		6	2	(Dynamo Kyiv)
Ivan Privalov	1902 – 1974	Kharkiv, Russian Empire - Kharkiv, Ukrainian SSR	6	0	(Rabis Kharkiv → Dynamo Kharkiv)
Oleksandr Babkin			5	(-5)(?)	(KhPZ Kharkiv)
Konstantin Shchegodskiy	1911 – 1989		4	1	(Dynamo Kyiv)
Mykola Krotov	1898–1978	Kharkiv, Russian Empire - Kharkiv, Ukrainian SSR	1	0	(Rabis Kharkiv)
Viktor Fomin	1929 – 2007	Sloviansk, Ukrainian SSR - ?	1	0
Valentyn Prokofyev			1	0	(Dynamo Kyiv)
Mykola Fomin	1909 – 1974		1	0	(Dynamo Kharkiv)
Anton Idzkovsky	1907 – 1995	Kiev, Russian Empire - Kyiv, Ukraine	1	0	(Dynamo Kyiv)
Aleksandr Shpakovsky	1899 – 1942		1	0	(Dynamo Kharkiv)
Volodymyr Fomin	1902 – 1942				(Dynamo Kharkiv)

== Ukrainian Olympians on the Soviet team ==
- Yozhef Betsa*
- Volodymyr Kaplychnyi
- Yozhef Sabo*
- Viktor Kolotov*
- Anatoliy Kuksov*
- Vyacheslav Semyonov
- Yuriy Yeliseyev
- Volodymyr Onyshchenko
- Oleh Blokhin
- Oleksandr Ponomarov (coach)
- Viktor Zvyahintsev
- Viktor Matviyenko
- Stefan Reshko
- Volodymyr Troshkin
- Mykhaylo Fomenko
- Anatoliy Konkov
- Leonid Buryak
- Volodymyr Veremeyev*
- Valeriy Lobanovskyi (coach)
- Volodymyr Bezsonov
- Sergei Baltacha
- Oleksiy Cherednyk*
- Vadym Tyshchenko
- Volodymyr Lyutyi
- Oleksiy Mykhaylychenko

== Russian Olympians born in Ukraine ==
- Sergey Shavlo
- Yuriy Istomin
- Vladimir Pilguy
- Sergey Andreyev
- Igor Dobrovolski
- Anatoliy Byshovets (coach)

== Ukrainian footballers on the Soviet junior teams ==
- Valeriy Horbunov
- Yuriy Kovalyov*
- Petro Slobodyan
- Viktor Chanov
- Sergei Baltacha
- Anatoliy Demyanenko
- Serhiy Zhuravlyov
- Viktor Kaplun
- Andriy Bal
- Yaroslav Dumanskyi
- Anatoliy Radenko
- Oleh Luzhnyi
- Andriy Sydelnykov
- Serhiy Shmatovalenko
- Serhiy Zayets
- Rostyslav Potochnyak
- Valentyn Kryachko
- Hryhoriy Batych
- Oleksandr Sopko
- Serhiy Zharkov
- Yuriy Syvukha
- Yuriy Dehteryov*
- Viktor Kuznetsov*
- Leonid Shmuts
- Oleksandr Berezhnoy
- Viktor Nastashevskyi*
- Anatoliy Saulevych
- Serhiy Krakovskyi
- Serhiy Naidenko
- Serhiy Ovchynnykov*
- Valeriy Zubenko
- Mykhaylo Olefirenko
- Oleh Taran
- Ihor Lytvynenko
- Volodymyr Bednyi
- Oleh Benko*
- Serhiy Bezhenar
- Oleg Salenko*
- Anatoliy Mushchynka
- Yuriy Mokrytskyi
- Yuriy Moroz
- Oleh Matveyev*
- Valeriy Vysokos
- Mykola Rusyn
- Yuriy Makarov
- Yevhen Pokhlebayev
- Serhiy Scherbakov
- Volodymyr Sharan
- Serhiy Kandaurov*

== Russian footballers born in Ukraine ==
- Yuri Susloparov
- Gennadi Kostylev (coach)
- Oleksandr Pomazun
- Sergei Mamchur (Russia U-21)
- Grigori Bogemsky 1913
- Evgeni Aldonin 2002–07
- Artyom Bezrodny 1999
- Viktor Budyanskiy 2007
- Igor Dobrovolski 1992–98
- Oleksandr Horshkov 1998
- Andrei Kanchelskis 1992–98
- Andrei Karyaka 2001–05
- Vladimir Lebed 1995
- Roman Neustädter 2016–
- Yuriy Nikiforov 1993–2002
- Gennadiy Nizhegorodov 2000–03
- Viktor Onopko 1992–2004
- Sergei Podpaly 1992–94
- Sergei Semak 1997–2010
- Vladislav Ternavsky 1994–96
- Ilya Tsymbalar 1994–99
- Sergei Yuran 1992–99
- Anton Shvets 2018–

== Senior national team all-time records ==
Here included players that with help of FIFA, the Russian Football Union claims of their own. Such players, Oleg Blokhin, Oleg Protasov, and Anatoliy Demyanenko, still are the indicators of class for all players in Ukraine. Those players committed their playing career to the clubs of the Lower Dnipro river region.

As of 26 March 2025

=== Most capped Ukraine players ===
#	Name	Period	Caps	Goals
1	Anatoliy Tymoschuk	2000 – 2016	144	4
2	Andriy Yarmolenko	2009 –	125	46
3	Oleg Blokhin	1972 – 1988	112	42
4	Andriy Shevchenko	1995 – 2012	111	48
5	Andriy Pyatov	2007 – 2022	102	0
6	Ruslan Rotan	2003 – 2018	100	8
7	Oleh Husyev	2002 – 2016	98	13
8	Oleksandr Shovkovskyi	1994 – 2012	92	0
9	Yevhen Konoplyanka	2010 –	87	21
=	Taras Stepanenko	2010 –	87	4
11	Anatoliy Demyanenko	1981 – 1990	80	6
12	Volodymyr Bezsonov	1977 – 1990	79	4
13	Mykola Matviyenko	2017 –	76	0
14	Serhii Rebrov	1992 – 2006	75	15
15	Andriy Voronin	2002 – 2012	74	8
16	Oleksandr Zinchenko	2015 –	71	10
=	Andriy Husin	1993 – 2006	71	9
18	Oleh Protasov	1984 – 1994	69	29
19	Andriy Vorobei	2000 – 2008	68	9
20	Andriy Nesmachniy	2000 – 2009	67	0

=== Top Ukraine goalscorers ===
#	Name	Period	Goals (Caps)	Average
1	Andriy Shevchenko	1995 – 2012	48 (111)	0.44
2	Andriy Yarmolenko	2009 –	46 (125)	0.368
3	Oleg Blokhin	1972 – 1988	42 (112)	0.375
4	Oleh Protasov	1984 – 1994	29 (69)	0.42
5	Viktor Kolotov	1970 – 1978	22 (54)	0.407
6	Yevhen Konoplyanka	2010 – 2023	21 (87)	0.241
7	Roman Yaremchuk	2018 –	17 (61)	0.279
8	Anatoliy Byshovets	1966 – 1972	15 (39)	0.385
8	Hennadiy Litovchenko	1984 – 1994	15 (62)	0.242
8	Serhii Rebrov	1992 – 2006	15 (75)	0.2
11	Viktor Tsyhankov	2016 -	13 (59)	0.22
11	Oleh Husyev	2003 – 2016	13 (98)	0.133
13	Serhiy Nazarenko	2003 – 2012	12 (56)	0.214
14	Artem Dovbyk	2021 -	11 (36)	0.306
14	Volodymyr Onyshchenko	1972 – 1977	11 (44)	0.25
14	Yevhen Seleznyov	2008 – 2018	11 (57)	0.193
17	Leonid Buryak	1974 – 1983	10 (53)	0.189
17	Oleksandr Zinchenko	2015 -	10 (71)	0.141
18	Andriy Vorobey	2000 – 2008	9 (68)	0.132
18	Andriy Husin	1993 – 2006	9 (71)	0.127
19	Tymerlan Huseynov	1993 – 1997	8 (14)	0.571
19	Artem Kravets	2011 – 2019	8 (23)	0.348
19	Igor Belanov	1985 – 1990	8 (33)	0.242
19	Yozhef Sabo	1965 – 1968	8 (40)	0.2
19	Anatoliy Konkov	1971 – 1978	8 (47)	0.17
19	Artem Milevskyi	2006 – 2012	8 (50)	0.16
19	Andriy Voronin	2002 – 2012	8 (74)	0.108
19	Ruslan Rotan	2003 – 2018	8 (100)	0.08

== List of Ukrainian coaches coaching other national teams ==
In bold are coaches that eventually coached the Ukrainian football national team.

- Oleksandr Ponomariov ( (Soviet Union) Soviet national football team 1972)
- **Oleh Bazylevych** ( (Soviet Union) Soviet national football team 1974–1976, 1979), ( Bulgaria Olympic football team 1988–1989), ( Kuwait national under-23 football team 1995–1996)
- **Valeriy Lobanovskyi** ( (Soviet Union) Soviet national football team 1975–1976, 1982–1983, 1986–1990), ( (United Arab Emirates) UAE national football team 1990–1993), ( Kuwait national football team 1994–1996)
- Valeriy Yaremchenko ( Syria national football team 1985–1987)
- Anatoliy Azarenkov ( Syria national football team 1987–1990, 1992), ( Kuwait national under-20 football team 1993–1997)
- **Mykhaylo Fomenko** ( Iraq national football team 1990), ( Guinea national football team 1994)
- Anatoliy Byshovets ( South Korea national football team 1994–1995, South Korea national under-23 football team 1995–1996)
- **Volodymyr Muntyan** ( Guinea national football team 1995–1998)
- Viktor Pozhechevskyi ( Turkmenistan national football team 1998)
- Volodymyr Salkov ( Uzbekistan national football team 2000–2001)
- Volodymyr Bezsonov ( Turkmenistan national football team 2002–2003)
- Viktor Pasulko ( Moldova national football team 2002–2005)
- Semen Altman ( Moldova national football team 2019)
