= Aleksandr Martynov =

Aleksandr or Alexander Martynov may refer to:

- Aleksandr Martynov (Russian politician) (1865–1935), member of the Menshevik movement
- Aleksandr Martynov (Transnistrian politician), Prime Minister since December 2016
- Aleksandr Martynov (footballer) (1892–1956), Russian footballer
- Alexander Martynov (coach), Russian swimming coach
- Alexander V. Martynov, Russian malacologist

== See also ==
- Martynov
