= Martynov =

Martynov (Russian: Марты́нов), or Martynova (feminine; Мартынова) is a common Russian last name. It is derived from the male given name Martyn and literally means 'Martyn's'. It may refer to:

- Aleksandr Nikolayevich Martynov (1892–1956), a Russian international football player
- Alexander Samoylovich Martynov (1865–1935), a right-wing Russian Menshevik
- Alexander Vasilyevich Martynov (1919–1980), a Soviet aircraft pilot and Hero of the Soviet Union
- Alexander Yevstafyevich Martynov (1816–1860), a Russian actor
- Aleksei Martynov (b. 1978), a Russian footballer
- Alexey Alexandrovich Martynov (1818–1903), a Russian historian, archaeologist, and architect
- Alexey Petrovich Martynov (1920–1994), a Soviet aircraft pilot and Hero of the Soviet Union
- Alexey Vasilyevich Martynov (1868–1934), a Russian surgeon
- Andrey Martynov, name of several people
- Daniel Martynov (born 2006), American figure skater
- Kirill Martynov (born 1981), Russian journalist and philosopher
- Leonid Martynov (1905–1980), a Soviet poet
- Mikhail Martynov (1909–1986), a Soviet aircraft pilot and Hero of the Soviet Union
- Moisey Martynov (1909–?), a Soviet army officer and Hero of the Soviet Union
- Natalya Martynova (born 1970), Russian cross-country skier
- Nikolai Martynov (1815–1875), a Russian army officer who shot Mikhail Lermontov
- Olga Martynova (born 1962), Russian-German writer
- Sergei Martynov, name of several people
- Yevgeny Ivanovich Martynov (1864–1937), a Russian military historian
- Yevgeny Grigoryevich Martynov (1948–1990), a Soviet singer
- Yevgeny Martynov (born 1976), a Ukrainian figure skater
- Vladimir Martynov (b. 1946), a Russian composer of classical music
