= Fomin =

Fomin (Russian: Фомин), or Fomina (feminine; Фомина), is a common Russian surname that is derived from the male given name Foma and literally means Foma's. Notable people with the surname include:

== Fomin ==
- Aleksandr Fomin (botanist) (1869–1935), Russian/Soviet botanist and academician
- Aleksandr Fomin, alias of Soviet spy Alexander Feklisov (1914–2007), known for receiving information from Julius Rosenberg and his contacts during the Cuban Missile Crisis
- Andriy Fomin (born 1977), Ukrainian Olympic speedskater
- Artyom Fomin (born 1988), Russian football player
- Boris Fomin (1900–1948), Russian composer of folk music
- Daniil Fomin (born 1997), Russian football player
- Denis Fomin (born 1996), Russian football defender
- Dmitry Fomin (born 1968), Russian Olympic volleyball player
- Fedor Fomin (born 1968), Russian/Norwegian computer scientist
- Ivan Fomin (1872–1936), a Russian/Soviet architect
- Margarita Fomina (born 1988), Russian curler
- Maxim Yurevich Fomin, real name of Vladlen Tatarsky (1982–2023), Russian-Ukrainian military blogger
- Mitya Fomin (born 1974), Russian singer, dancer and producer
- Mykola Fomin (1909–1974), Ukrainian football player
- Nikolai Fomin, chief engineer at the Chernobyl Nuclear Power Plant during the Chernobyl disaster
- Ruslan Fomin (born 1986), a Ukrainian football player
- Semyon Fomin (born 1989), Russian football player
- Sergei Fomin (1917–1975), Russian mathematician
- Sergey Fomin (born 1958), Russian/American mathematician
- Viktor Fomin (1929–2007), a Soviet football player
- Volodymyr Fomin (1902–1942), Ukrainian football player and coach
- Vyacheslav Fomin (born 1969), Russian football player
- Yefim Fomin (1909–1941), Soviet political commissar
- Yevstigney Fomin (1761–1800), Russian opera composer

== Fomina ==
- Alena Fomina-Klotz (born 1989), Russian tennis player
- Anastasia Fomina (born 1983), Russian basketball player
- Elena Fomina (born 1979), Russian footballer
- Margarita Fomina (born 1988), Russian curler
- Mariya Fomina, Russian theater and film actress
- Oleksandra Fomina (born 1966), Ukraininan Olympic volleyball player
- Olga Fomina, Russian handball player
- Olya Fomina, American singer and musician
- Tatyana Fomina (born 1954), Estonian chess player
