= FC Dynamo Kharkiv =

Defunct association football club in Soviet Union

Dynamo Kharkiv
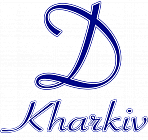
- Full name: FC Dynamo Kharkiv
- Founded: 1926
- Dissolved: 1946
- Ground: Dynamo Stadium
- League: Soviet First League

FC Dynamo Kharkiv (Ukrainian: Динамо Харків) was a non-amateur Soviet football club based in Kharkiv (now Ukraine).

== History ==
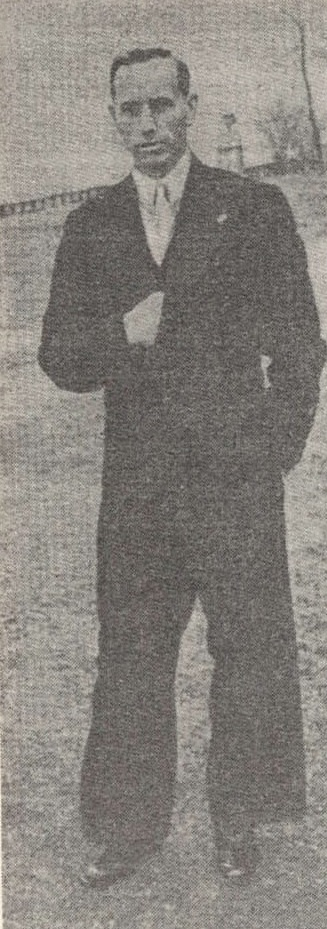
Mykola Krotov in 1941

=== Shturm Kharkiv ===
The club was originally found in 1911 by 20 year old Kostiantyn Voronin as FC Tsap-Tsarap Kharkov. During that time in Kharkiv took place the first regional and city championship that was won by FC Feniks Kharkov. The club Tsap-Tsarap however has officially registered only in 1912 as FC Shturm Kharkov and its first chairman became Ya.Zhuga. On 19 March 1912 there took place a constituent assembly of the Kharkov City League which was initially headed by M.Mayevsky (a player of FC Mayak Kharkov). The same year the league joined the Russian Football Union, while its collective team participated in the first championship of Russia. After the Russian Civil War the captain's armband Voronin passed on to a younger player Mykola Krotov.

In 1925 – 1926 RabIs Kharkiv, a Russian portmanteau that stands for Rabotniki Iskustv (Workers of Art), the team was part of the local art workers trade union.

=== Dynamo Kharkiv ===
Established back in the beginning of 1920s as part of sports department of Russian GPU (formerly Cheka), information about it was not publicly disclosed to avoid disclosing the GPU's internal affairs. In 1921 in center of Kharkiv the GPU club opened its doors on vulytsia Sovnarkomivska, 13, which had its own sports ground "Dynamo". Previously the house belonged to the Alchevsky family (Khrystyna Alchevska) which in its private garden had a bust of Taras Shevchenko. It was built by Ukrainian and Soviet architect Oleksiy Beketov, the Alchevsky family son-in-law, for Alchevsky family. Following the death of Oleksiy Alchevsky in 1901, Khrystyna sold it to active state councilor M.Shabelsky. After establishing of the Soviet regime, the property was confiscated and turned the garden into an athletic zone with volleyball and handball courts, gymnastic village, a pit for jumps, running track, showers. At the ground level story of the club small halls were turned into powerlifting and wrestling rooms. The neighboring two story building until 1928 housed the Soviet of People's Commissars of the Ukrainian SSR (Soviet government of Ukraine) and its staff also enjoyed using the GPU sports grounds. Around that in the city's park (today Park of Maxim Gorky) started to work the Dynamo sky sports base with a 25-meter shooting range.

The Dynamo's first football and handball teams debuted in city competitions in 1925, but consisted exclusively out of members of law enforcement only. The most notable among them were the Soviet national football team defender Kostiantyn Fomin who worked in GPU (Ukrainian OGPU before merger) and the Ukraine national football team (Ukrainian SSR) forward Mykola Kazakov who was a criminal investigation official. Nonetheless, a lack of own playing field notably was restricting possibilities of footballers.

On 26 April 1926 at the GPU club took place a board elections of the first in Ukraine and capital at that time Kharkiv proletarian sports society "Dynamo". For functionaries of the proletarian sports society was allocated a room in the GPU club and they right away launched their operations. However, constituent documents of the sports society and its statute were finally confirmed by the chairman of GPU Vsevolod Balitsky only in October of the same year.

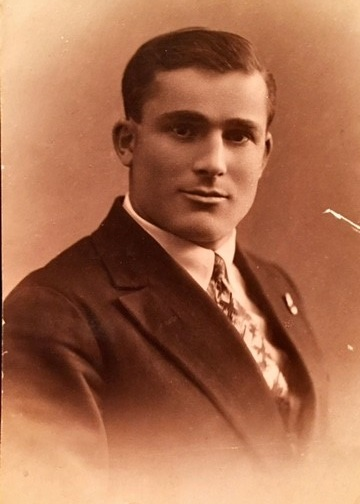
Ivan Privalov in 1923

In the neighboring Russian SFSR, where Dynamo was established earlier in 1923, the great boost in its development provided the newly acquired famous footballers. The same practice was adopted by the Kharkiv's Dynamo which was the central Dynamo sports society in Ukraine until 1934. In fall of 1926 Dynamo Kharkiv invited practically all footballers the RabIs team (Workers of Art Trade Union) formed out of former Shturm Kharkiv and struggled financially and the Kharkiv city football team that won the first Soviet football championship in 1924 consisting of such midfielders of the Soviet national football team like Ivan Privalov and Volodymyr Fomin, national team goalie Roman Norov, bright forwards Oleksandr Shpakovskyi and Petro Mishchenko who played in the very first composed Soviet national football team as well as their colleagues of the Kharkiv city football team Yevhen Gubarev and Valentyn Levin. They were later joined by defender Ivan Kladko, forward Ivan Vladimirsky and midfielder Oleksandr Misevra who also was playing an ice hockey. Dynamo was created in 1926 based on the best Kharkiv clubs FC Shturm Kharkiv and Society of Sports Amateurs (Obschestvo Liubitelei Sporta, OLS).

In 1936 it initially was allowed to play in the Soviet Second League known as Class B. The team had forfeited all its games for the spring part and was demoted to the third division Class V (by Russian alphabet) for the autumn of 1936 and 1937 editions. The team was not included in the Soviet Super League of 1938, but returned into the reestablished Class B the next couple of seasons before the German-Soviet War. It was merged with FC Silmash Kharkiv and renamed as Spartak for the 1941 season. Following World War II, the club has never resumed its operations as the city was able only to afford one team, FC Lokomotyv Kharkiv.

== League and Cup history ==
Season	Div.	Pos.	Pl.	W	D	L	GS	GA	P	Domestic Cup	Europe	Notes
1936 sp	2nd	8	0	0	0	0	0	0	0			Withdrew
1936 au	3rd	7	7	1	3	3	6	14	12	II round		
1937	3rd	9	9	3	0	6	20	21	15	III round		
1939	2nd	7	22	10	7	5	43	31	27	1/16 finals		
1940	2nd	4	26	12	5	9	44	37	29			
1957	Rep; Zone 6	6	10	2	1	7	9	18	5			

== Managers ==
- 1928 (team's captain)
- 1935–1936 Oleksandr Shpakovsky
- 1937 Volodymyr Fomin
- 1939–1941 Volodymyr Fomin
- ????–???? Mykola Fomin

== See also ==
- FC Feniks Kharkiv
- FC Silmash Kharkiv
- FC Kharkiv
- FC Arsenal Kharkiv
- FC Hazovyk-KhGV Kharkiv
- FC Helios Kharkiv
- FC Lokomotyv Kharkiv
- FC Metalist Kharkiv
