= Mykola Krotov =

Ukrainian and Soviet footballer

Nikolai Krotov
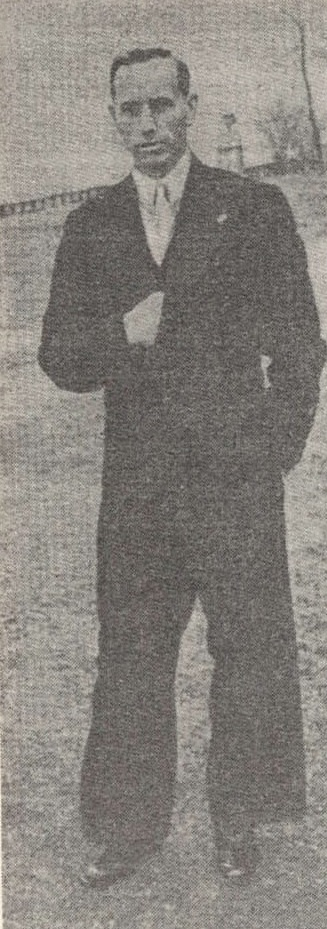

Personal information
- Full name: Mykola Fedorovych Krotov
- Date of birth: 1898
- Place of birth: Kharkiv, Russian Empire
- Date of death: 1978 (aged 79–80)
- Place of death: Kharkiv, Ukrainian SSR, USSR
- Positions: Defender; midfielder

Youth career
- Zvyozdochka Kharkiv

Senior career*
Years	Team	Apps	(Gls)
1914–1915	Shturm Kharkiv		
1920–1926	Shturm Kharkiv / RabIs Kharkiv		
1927–1933	KhPZ Kharkiv		

International career
1925	USSR	1	(0)

Managerial career
- 1936–1938: FC Spartak Kharkiv
- 1941: FC Spartak Kharkiv
- 1947: FC Lokomotiv Kharkiv
Medal record
Men's football
Representing [[|Kharkiv]]
Soviet Union Football Championship
Winner	1924 USSR Championship
Ukraine Football Championship
Winner	1921
Winner	1922
Winner	1923
Winner	1924
Winner	1927
- * Club domestic league appearances and goals

Mykola Fedorovych Krotov (Ukrainian: Микола Федорович Кротов, Russian: Николай Фёдорович Кротов, Nikolai Fyodorovich Krotov; 1898–1978) was a Ukrainian and Soviet football player and manager. He also played in Russian hockey (Bandy).

== Biography ==
Mykola Krotov was born in 1898 in family of a hearth (oven) builder (pechnik). He became involved with football at age of 12 playing for a local children team which was referred by its nickname "Zvezdochka". Krotov was a big fan of Kharkiv team Shturm (predecessor of FC Dynamo Kharkiv) which played in the Kharkiv Football League and when he was about 15 years old, he was invited to play for the team. In Shturm originally he played as inside left forward, but often also held position of central midfielder.

After a season or two he was drafted as a soldier to the Russian Imperial Army fighting at the South-Western Front. As a praporshchik, the 18-year-old Krotov led his company on successful assault of one of the heights which was considered to be impregnable. For that feat he was awarded the Order of Saint Anna which following the Bolshevik coup-d'état caused him challenges in his sports career as a "Tsarist award recipient". Following the World War I, Krotov supposedly voluntarily joined the RKKA (Red Army) and fought for the Bolsheviks.

In 1920 Krotov returned to football paying for Shturm. The team joined other former Red Army members such as Ivan Natarov, Mykola Kazakov, Ivan Privalov, Yakiv Alfyorov, Mykola Kaputsyn, Ivan Kolotukhin and others. Out of those only Natarov and Kolotukhin really had previous experience playing at competitive level. Krotov also received the captain's armband from the team's founder Kostiantyn Voronin. The role of a head coach in Shturm at that time served the team's captain.

In 1924 he played in position of the right fullback in Shturm as well as for the Kharkiv city football team. In this position Krotov earned the All-Union recognition and Nikolay Starostin said the following about him: "In the Ukrainian ensemble excellently performed defenders the tall Mykola Krotov and the not-so-tall, but hasty Kostiantyn Fomin" ("В ансамбле украинцев отлично выступили защитники: Высокий Николай Кротов и невысокий, но стремительный Константин Фомин"). At the same position Krotov played on the Soviet Union national football team when it played against Turkey in 1925. Eventually he became a universal player taking position sometimes as a goalkeeper. One of his teammates Ivan Natarov commented about him: "There is nothing unordinary about it. After all, for him, an ordinary "slesar" (locksmith, fitter), sport has always been a holy cause. It was he who, having become the captain, insisted on introducing an unspoken law in Shturm: any violation of the sports regime was punished by the exclusion of a player from the team".

== International career ==
Krotov played his only game for USSR on 15 May 1925 in a friendly against Turkey.

== Honours ==
=== Sports honours ===
- Soviet Union championship among republics
  - Winner (1): 1924
- Ukraine championship among cities
  - Winners (5): 1921, 1922, 1923, 1924, 1927

=== State honours ===
- Order of Saint Anna – veteran of World War I
- Soviet Union Merited Master of Sports (1947)
