= Sergei Martynov =

Sergei Martynov or Sergey Martynov may refer to:

- Sergey Martynov (archer) (born 1965), Kazakh archer
- Sergei Martynov (politician) (born 1953), former Belarusian Minister for Foreign Affairs
- Sergey Martynov (politician) (born 1959), Russian senator
- Sergei Martynov (serial killer) (born 1962), Russian serial killer accused of killing nine women between 1992 and 2010
- Sergei Martynov (sport shooter) (born 1968), Belarusian rifle shooter
- Sergey Martynov (wrestler) (1971–1997), Russian Greco-Roman wrestler
