= Ukraine national football team =

Men's national association football team representing Ukraine

Ukraine
- Nickname(s): Синьо-жовті / Synʹo-zhovti (The Blue and Yellow); Збірна / Zbirna (The National Team)
- Association: Ukrainian Association of Football (UAF); Українська Асоціація Футболу2026–27
- Confederation: UEFA (Europe)
- Head coach: Andrea Maldera
- Captain: Mykola Matviyenko
- Most caps: Anatoliy Tymoshchuk (144) (Note: On 11 March 2022, UAF annulled Tymoshchuk's caps and goals for the national team due to his refusal to speak out against the 2022 Russian invasion of Ukraine.)
- Top scorer: Andriy Shevchenko (48)
- Home stadium: due to the Russo-Ukrainian War - Various in other countries (Poland, Czech Republic, Slovakia, Germany, Spain)
- FIFA code: UKR
| First colours | Second colours |

FIFA ranking
- Current: 36 (18 November 2026)
- Highest: 11 (February 2007)
- Lowest: 132 (September 1993)

First international
- Ukraine 1–3 Hungary (Uzhhorod, Ukraine; 29 April 1992)

Biggest win
- Ukraine 9–0 San Marino (Lviv, Ukraine; 6 September 2013)

Biggest defeat
- France 7–1 Ukraine (Saint-Denis, France; 7 October 2020)

World Cup
- Appearances: 1 (first in 2006)
- Best result: Quarter-finals (2006)

European Championship
- Appearances: 4 (first in 2012)
- Best result: Quarter-finals (2020)
- Website: uaf.ua

The Ukraine national football team (Ukrainian: Збірна України з футболу, romanized: Zbirna Ukrainy z futbolu) represents Ukraine in men's international football, and is governed by the Ukrainian Association of Football, the governing body for football in Ukraine. Ukraine's home ground is the Olimpiyskiy Stadium in Kyiv. The team has been a full member of UEFA and FIFA since 1992.

After the restoration of the Ukrainian independence, the team played their first match against Hungary on 29 April 1992. In their debut in a major world championship, the team reached the quarter-finals in the 2006 FIFA World Cup. Ukraine is one of only three post-Soviet states to have qualified for the FIFA World Cup finals, the others being Uzbekistan and Russia.

As the host nation, Ukraine automatically qualified for UEFA Euro 2012. Four years later, Ukraine finished third in their qualifying group for Euro 2016 and advanced for the first time, via the play-off route and qualifiers, to reach a UEFA European Championship tournament. This marked the first time in Ukraine's six play-off appearances that it managed to win a tie, having lost previous play-off ties for the 1998 World Cup, Euro 2000, the 2002 World Cup, the 2010 World Cup and the 2014 World Cup, and would lose again in the 2022 and 2026 World Cup play-offs.

Ukraine's best performances in the UEFA European Championship and in the World Cup were in 2020 and 2006 respectively, reaching the quarter-finals for the first time in both cases.

== History ==
=== Ukrainian SSR (1924–1990) ===
The national team was formed in the early 1990s and was recognized internationally soon thereafter. Ukraine, under the Ukrainian Soviet Socialist Republic, previously had a national team in 1924–1935 just like the Russian Soviet Federative Socialist Republic. The national team included the players Andriy Ponomarenko, Ivan Privalov, Volodymyr Fomin, H. Syrota, Mykola Fomin, Anatoliy Lisnyi, Oleksandr Shatokha (goalkeeper), Dmytro Kyryllov, Dmytro Starusev, Serhiy Kopeiko, Petro Parovyshnykov (first team); Valentyn Prokofyev, Fedir Tyutchev, H. Yakubovskyi, Ivan Vladymyrskyi, Serafim Moskvin (goalkeeper), Kazymyr Piontkovskyi, Mykhailo Pashuta, Vasiliy Yepishin, Adam Bem, K. Us, Volodymyr Prasolov (second team).

The earliest record of games played by Ukraine can be traced back to August 1928. A championship among the national teams of the Soviet republics as well as the Moscow city team took place in Moscow; at the All-Soviet tournament, Ukraine reached the final where it lost to Moscow 1–0, after defeating Belarus and Transcaucasus.

In 1929, Ukraine beat Lower Austria in an exhibition match in Kharkiv 4–1, and played in another Soviet tournament. Ukraine lost to Transcaucasus 3–0.

=== Official formation ===
Before 1991, Ukrainian players were represented by the Soviet Union national team. After the collapse of the USSR in 1991, Russia took its place in the qualifying tournament for the 1994 World Cup. The Ukraine national team did not enter the tournament as it was not yet admitted to FIFA. Meanwhile, some of the best Ukrainian players of the 1990s (including Andrei Kanchelskis, Viktor Onopko, Sergei Yuran, Yuriy Nikiforov, Ilya Tsymbalar and Oleg Salenko) chose to play for Russia. At the time, Vyacheslav Koloskov, a top official from the former Soviet Union and later Russia, served as a vice-president of UEFA from 1980–1996 representing the Soviet Union and later the Commonwealth of Independent States (CIS).

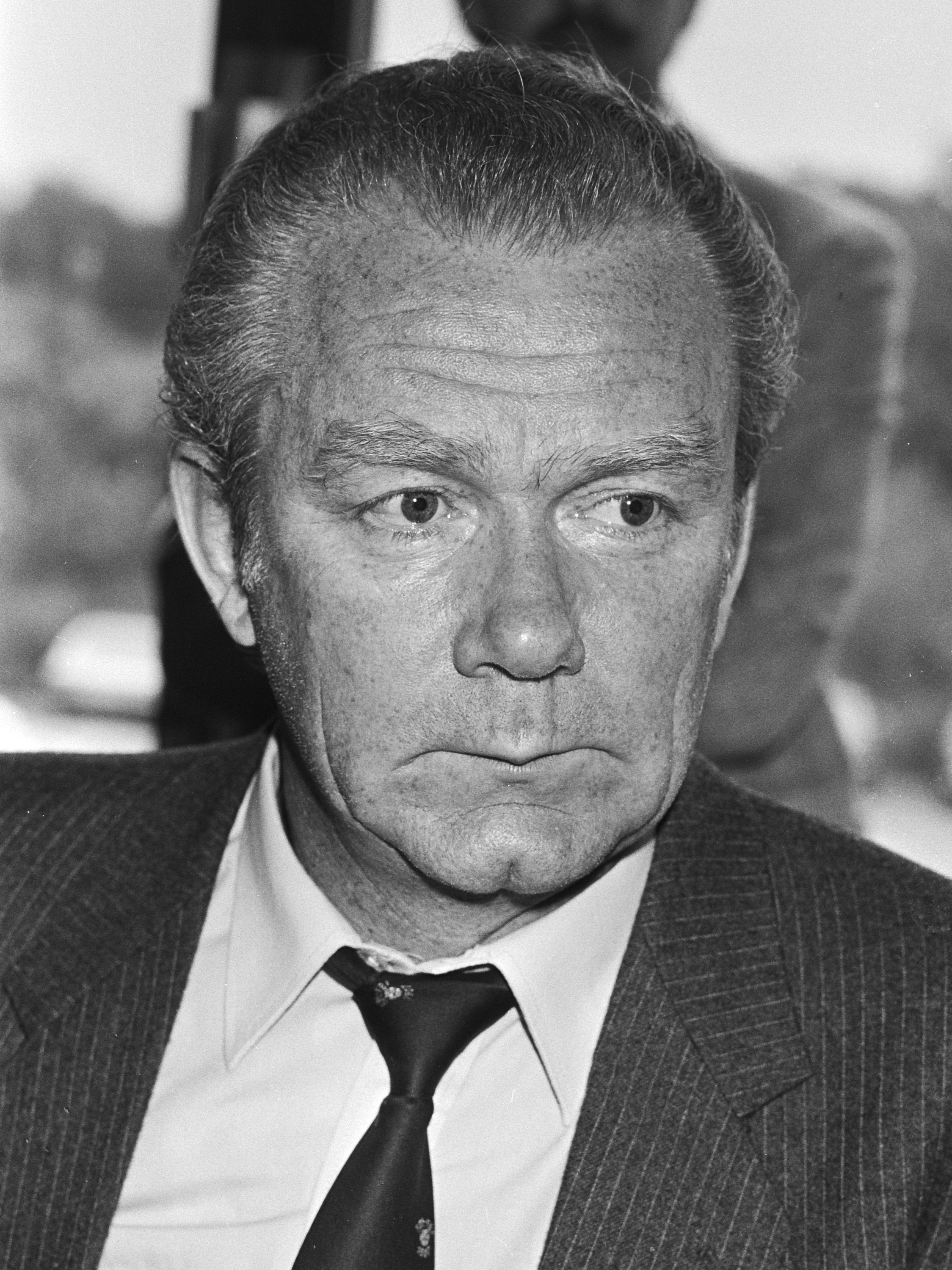
Valeriy Lobanovskyi was Head Coach of the National Team in 1979 and between 2001 and 2002.

The Soviet Union's five-year UEFA coefficient (earned in part by Ukrainian players), was transferred to the Russian national team. As a result, a crisis was created for both the national team and the domestic league.

Controversy developed because the Ukrainian football league lacked adequate funding for their teams due to the economic crisis affecting all CIS countries. There also was a reverse influx of players; Viktor Leonenko agreed on transfer from Dynamo Moscow to Dynamo Kyiv. The Russian club did not want to release him, but Leonenko did not want to continue to play in Moscow.

In the following years, the Ukrainian team improved, including talents like Andriy Shevchenko, Serhiy Rebrov, and Oleksandr Shovkovskyi.

=== First official games (Prokopenko) ===
In 1992, Ukraine was accepted as a full member to FIFA and UEFA at which time Ukraine selected its first manager by members of a coaching council which consisted of Anatoliy Puzach (manager of Dynamo Kyiv), Yevhen Kucherevskyi (FC Dnipro), Yevhen Lemeshko (Torpedo Zaporizhzhia), Yukhym Shkolnykov (Bukovyna Chernivtsi) and Viktor Prokopenko (Chornomorets Odesa). Later, they were joined by Valeriy Yaremchenko (Shakhtar Donetsk). The circle was narrowed to three specialists and Prokopenko eventually became the manager.

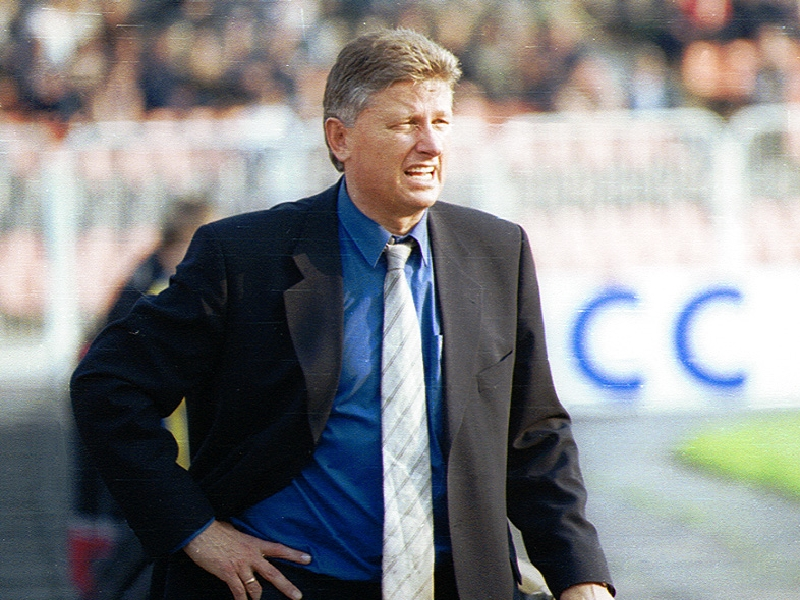
Viktor Prokopenko, the first official manager of the national team

Ukraine played their first match on 29 April 1992 against Hungary in Uzhhorod at the Avanhard Stadium, losing 3–1 with the sole Ukrainian goal scored by Ivan Hetsko. With the creation of a "phantom" (transitional) CIS team in place of the Soviet Union playing against England in Moscow in preparation for the UEFA Euro 1992. That year the Ukrainian team lost some notable players to the Soviet Union team. Following several losses to Hungary and a draw to the United States, Prokopenko resigned and the last season game was led by his assistants Mykola Pavlov and Leonid Tkachenko.

=== Euro 1996 qualification (Bazylevych) ===
Ukraine appointed head coach, Oleh Bazylevych, who made his debut with the national team in the spring of 1993 in Odesa during a friendly game against Israel, resulting in a 1–1 draw. Less than one month later, Ukraine finally won in Vilnius against Lithuania. During that summer they lost 3–1 to Croatia; Ukraine was later seeded in Group 4 of the UEFA Euro 1996 qualification.

Ukraine was defeated by Israel in March 1994, and drew Bulgaria and the United Arab Emirates. On 7 September 1994, the national team started its first official qualification campaign with a home loss 2–0 to Lithuania. Following the defeat and a weak performances in preceding friendlies, Bazylevych was fired and the tour to South Korea was led by the Bazylevych assistants Pavlov and Muntyan. Soon thereafter the Federation signed a contract with Valeriy Lobanovsky. On 24 September, the Football Federation of Ukraine appointed Yozhef Sabo as an acting manager until the end of the year after Lobanovsky signed a contract with Kuwait.

Under Sabo's management, the team's next home game against Slovenia ended goalless and they eventually beat Estonia 3–0, gaining their first win in an official competitive game. At the beginning of the year the Football Federation confirmed Anatoliy Konkov as the new head coach on 5 January 1995.

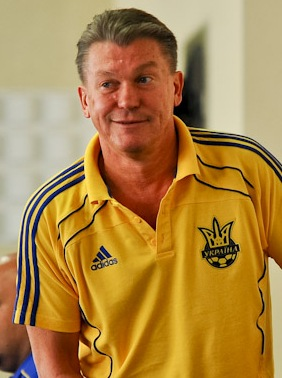
Oleg Blokhin, two spells in charge of the Ukraine national team

Under coach Konkov, the team started with away losses of 4–0 to Croatia and 3–0 to Italy. Following the losses, there was a three-game winning streak including a home victory against Croatia. A subsequent loss to Slovenia had the team finishing in fourth place in its first qualification campaign behind Lithuania.

=== 1998–2004: near misses ===
Following Konkov's departure in 1996, the Federation appointed Sabo as head coach. Separately, there was a preliminary agreement with Lobanovsky to coach following his contract end with Kuwait.

Ukraine participated in 1998 World Cup qualification, where the team was drawn into Group 9. Ukraine took second place, behind Germany and ahead of Portugal, but was defeated in a play-off stage 3–1 on aggregate by Croatia. The qualification campaign became notable as the beginning of the international career of Shevchenko as well as providing more play time for players such as Oleksandr Shovkovsky and Serhiy Rebrov.

In the UEFA Euro 2000 qualifying, Ukraine, assigned in Group 4, finished above Russia, thanks to an important draw in Moscow and a home victory. However, they still only qualified for the playoff behind the French side despite being undefeated. Ukraine then fell to Slovenia 3–2 on aggregate. Following the qualification campaign, the Federation finally signed a contract with Valery Lobanovsky, ending Sabo's tenure as a head coach.

The 2002 FIFA World Cup qualification saw Ukraine in Group 5. With Lobanovsky as a head coach, there were expectations of the first qualification to the finals. Yet, Ukraine suffered a home loss to Poland in their opening match, and many draws resulted in Ukraine qualifying for the playoff, losing to Germany, 5–2 on aggregate. Under public pressure, particularly the Higher League, head coaches argued for the removal of Lobanovsky and the Federation decided not to renew its contract with Lobanovsky, instead moving him to Dynamo Kyiv.

In the UEFA Euro 2004 qualifying, Ukraine with the new head coach Leonid Buryak, was assigned into Group 6, with Spain and Greece. Ukraine failed to qualify.

=== 2006 World Cup ===
After the Euro 2004 qualifying match, Ukraine appointed Oleg Blokhin as the national team's head coach. Placed in Group 2, Ukraine went on to qualify as a group winner for their first-ever FIFA World Cup on 3 September 2005, after drawing 1–1 against Georgia in Tbilisi (and ahead of Turkey), playing Denmark and their last campaign against rivals Greece (among others). This was the first successful qualification campaign for Ukraine despite a poor home turf performance.

In the 2006 World Cup, Ukraine was in Group H with Spain, Tunisia and Saudi Arabia. After losing 4–0 in the first match against Spain, the Ukrainians won the next two matches to face Switzerland in round 16. Drawing goalless, Ukraine took Switzerland to a penalty shoot-out where two saves from Oleksandr Shovkovsky secured a positive outcome for his side despite the first kick miss by Andriy Shevchenko. Switzerland which did not lose or yield a single goal was sent home early with Ukraine advancing to the quarterfinals. In the quarterfinals, Ukraine, facing Italy, was defeated with two second half two goals from Luca Toni, securing a comfortable 3–0 win for the future 2006 World Cup champions.

=== 2006–2012 ===
After the World Cup, Ukraine was placed in UEFA Euro 2008 qualifying Group B, along with Italy and France; Ukraine had also performed poorly against Scotland, Georgia and Lithuania, ultimately finishing in fourth place. Due to the bleak performance of the national team Oleg Blokhin resigned and surprisingly signed with the recently established FC Moscow.

With another Soviet football star player Oleksiy Mykhaylychenko as the new head coach, 2010 FIFA World Cup qualification saw Ukraine in Group 6, drawing Croatia and winning against England, sending Ukraine to the playoff. Greece, which had been eliminated by Ukraine in the qualifiers four years earlier, would eventually get revenge. Following the failure to qualify, the Federation decided not to renew the contract with Mykhaylychenko.

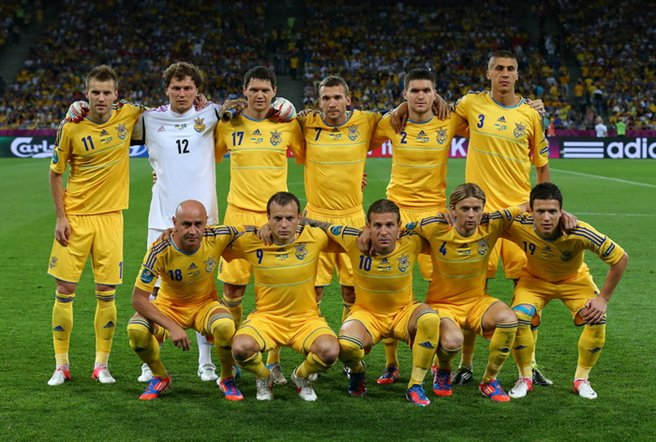
Ukraine in 2012

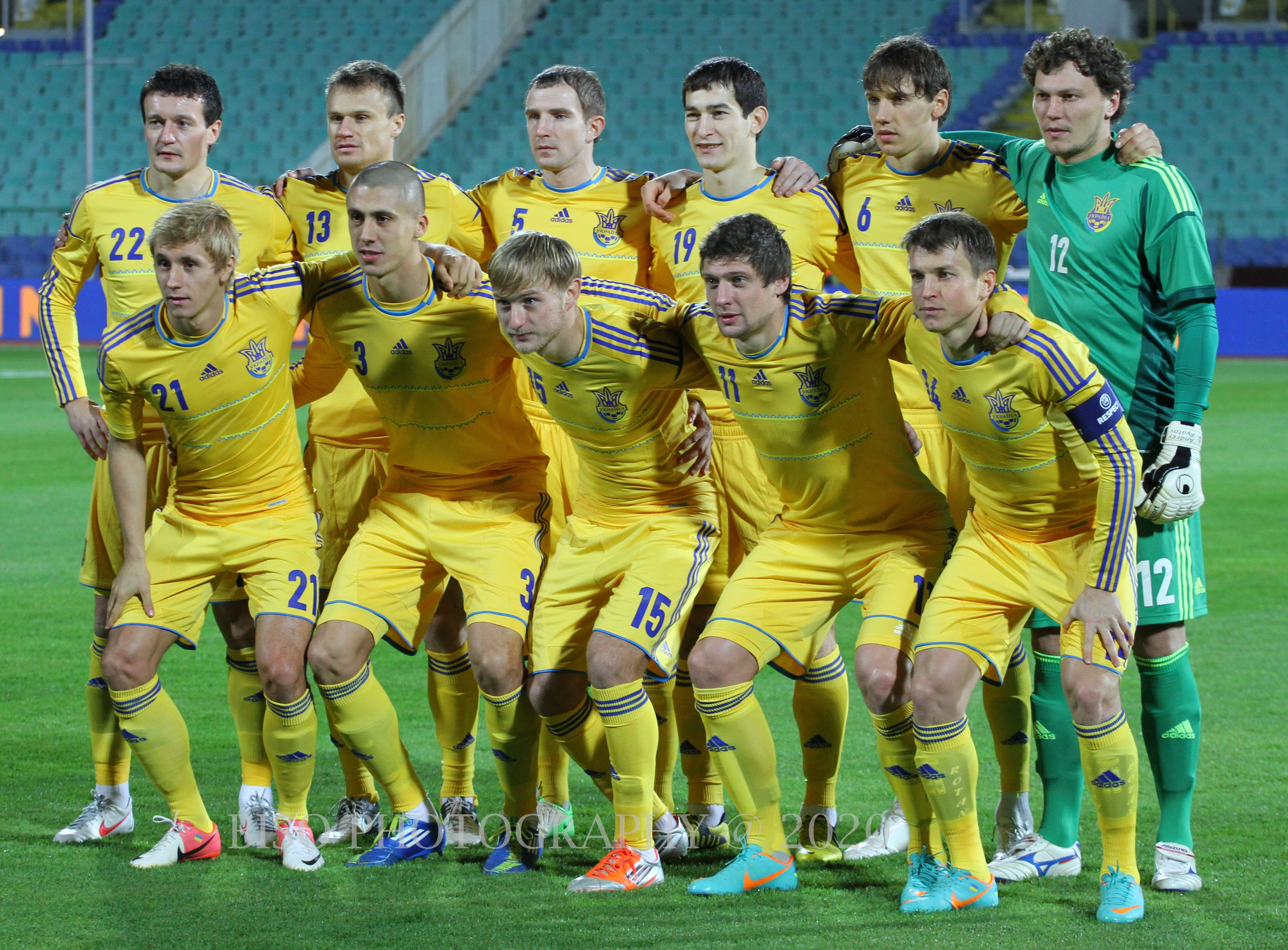
Ukraine before a match against Bulgaria, 14 December 2012

As co-hosts, Ukraine qualified automatically for Euro 2012, marking their debut in the UEFA European Championship. The Federation decided to appoint Myron Markevych to prepare and lead the national team in the Euro finals. However, following a few friendlies Markevych resigned due to the off-pitch politics and having held coaching office of both the national team and Metalist Kharkiv. For the next several games in 2010 and 2011 the national team was led by caretaker Yuriy Kalitvintsev who starred for Ukraine back in its first qualification campaign for the Euro 1996.

On 21 April 2011, Blokhin was again appointed head coach of the Ukraine national team signing a four-year contract. With Blokhin at helm in their opening game against Sweden, Ukraine won 2–1 in Kyiv. In Donetsk, Ukraine was eliminated after a 2–0 loss to France and a 1–0 defeat to England.

=== 2014–present ===
Drawn into UEFA Group H for 2014 World Cup qualification, Ukraine played against France, beating France at home 2–0 but suffered a 3–0 loss away. Blokhin stepped down due to health concerns in the autumn of 2012 soon after the first home game against England and was replaced by Andriy Bal and later Oleksandr Zavarov.

In 2012, the Federation appointed Mykhailo Fomenko as head coach. Even though the team under Fomenko did not manage to qualify for the World Cup, the Federation decided to retain his services until the end of 2015.

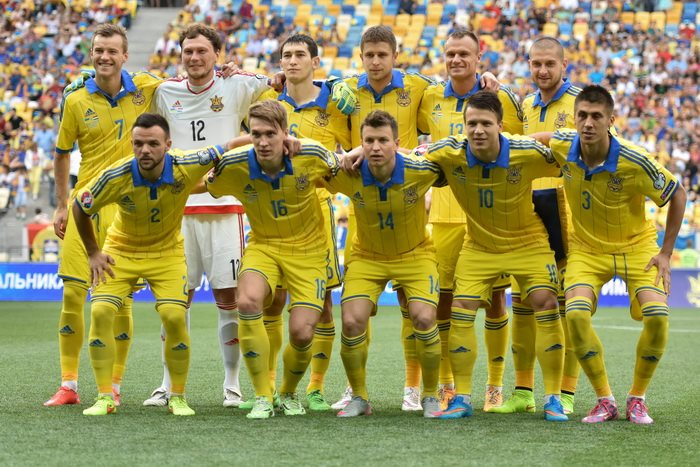
Ukraine in 2015

During ongoing conflicts with Russia, Ukraine in Euro 2016 qualifying was drawn against Spain, Slovakia, Belarus, Macedonia and Luxembourg. Despite having won all matches except those against Spain and Slovakia, Ukraine finished third. They defeated Slovenia in the playoff, marking their first qualification for a major tournament through the playoffs.

Ukraine lost all three games at Euro 2016 without scoring a goal.

Following the Euro 2016, Fomenko was replaced with Andriy Shevchenko as head coach (who was his assistant during the Euro finals). Seeded in the UEFA Group I, Ukraine started with a home draw to Iceland in 2018 World Cup qualifying and an away draw to Turkey but lost to Croatia failing to qualify for the playoffs for the first time since UEFA Euro 2004.

In the inaugural UEFA Nations League, Ukraine was drawn with the Czech Republic and Slovakia in League B. They beat the Czech Republic 2–1 away and Slovakia 1–0 at home, before earning a promotion to League A with a 1–0 home win to the Czech Republic.

==== UEFA Euro 2020 ====
Ukraine was placed in a group with Euro 2016 champions Portugal as well as Serbia.

As the COVID-19 crisis in Ukraine worsened, eight players from the starting squad tested positive (including one positive SARS-CoV-2 test upon arrival to Lucerne), as a result the entire delegation was put into quarantine by the Department of Health of the Canton of Lucerne. Their game against Switzerland away was subsequently cancelled. UEFA decided that the match result would be 3–0 in favour of Switzerland and the CAS subsequently upheld the result, meaning that Ukraine had been officially relegated after just one year in League A.

Ukraine qualified for the knockout stages in the European Championship as one of the best third-placed teams for the first time in the 2020 tournament, postponed to 2021 due to COVID-19. They beat Sweden 2–1 in the round of 16,and were then defeated by England in the quarter-final, recording their best finish at a major tournament since 2006.

In August 2021, Shevchenko was replaced with Oleksandr Petrakov. In the 2022 World Cup qualifying rounds, Ukraine drew 1–1 in both games against France. Ukraine would qualify for the playoff after breaking the record set by Australia for the most consecutive draws in World Cup qualification, with five straight draws. Ukraine eventually picked up a much-needed victory over Finland, ending their run of draws and giving them a two-point lead over Bosnia and a three-point lead over Finland. However, both Bosnia and Finland had a game in hand over Ukraine, who qualified for the playoffs after a 2–0 win over Bosnia and a Finnish loss to France. Ukraine faced Scotland in the Group A playoff semifinals, postponed in March 2022 to June after Russia invaded the country in February, winning 3–1 at Hampden Park, but ultimately losing 1–0 to Wales in an emotional playoff final at the Cardiff City Stadium.

Ukraine, who were relegated to League B in the 2nd Nations League due to their last-place finish (2 wins to 4 losses), failed to gain promotion to League A in the following Nations League, finishing 2nd in their group in the 3rd Nations League, beaten by Scotland against whom they lost in Glasgow in contrast to the play-off semi-final (0–3) and unable to beat the Tartan Army on neutral ground in the return leg (0–0).

==== UEFA Euro 2024 and 2026 FIFA World Cup qualifiers ====
In the qualifiers for the Euro 2024, Ukraine finished third in their highly competitive group, with four wins, two draws and two defeats. However, Italy finished ahead of the Zbirna only thanks to a favourable head-to-head record despite having the same number of points, while in the decisive Ukraine/Italy match (0–0) on neutral ground in Leverkusen, Germany, a refereeing error was made to the Ukrainians' disadvantage with a penalty not whistled for an Italian foul at the end of match.

Eligible for the play-offs as the best non-group winner, Ukraine initially defeated Bosnia 2–1 away in the semi-finals of the Path B play-offs on March 21, 2024. Five days later, on March 26, 2024, Ukraine qualified for Euro 2024 in Germany, beating Iceland 2–1 in the play-off final at the Wrocław Stadium in Poland. In this decisive final, as in the semi-final against Bosnia, Ukraine conceded the opening goal on each occasion and managed to turn the match around, winning by a narrow margin at the very end. Having been drawn into Group E with Romania, Belgium and Slovakia, Ukraine finished level with all the other teams in the group on four points, but were knocked out on goal difference.

In the 2026 FIFA World Cup qualifiers, Ukraine was drawn in Group D alongside France, Iceland, and Azerbaijan. The campaign began with a 2–0 defeat to France and a 1–1 draw with Azerbaijan, before a 5–3 away victory over Iceland, with goals scored by Ruslan Malinovskyi, Oleksiy Hutsulyak, Ivan Kalyuzhnyi, and Oleh Ocheretko. A 2–1 home win against Azerbaijan was followed by a 4–0 defeat in the reverse fixture against France in Paris. Ukraine finished second place in the group with 10 points after a 2–0 victory over Iceland in Warsaw, thereby qualifying for the play-offs for the second consecutive time.

On 26 March 2026, Ukraine faced Sweden in the play-off semi-final in Valencia, Spain. Despite a late goal from Matvii Ponomarenko in the 90th minute, a hat-trick by Viktor Gyökeres resulted in a 3–1 defeat, ending Ukraine’s hopes of qualifying for the 2026 World Cup. On 22 April, the Ukrainian Association of Football announced that head coach Serhiy Rebrov had stepped down by mutual agreement.

On 18 May 2026, the president of the Ukrainian Association of Football, Andriy Shevchenko, announced the appointment of Italian manager Andrea Maldera as the new head coach. This made Maldera the first foreign coach in the history of the men's national team. One of his primary objectives as coach is to qualify for the UEFA Euro 2028 and top Ukraine's group in the upcoming Nations League scheduled for September 2026.

== Stadiums ==
Most matches are held at Kyiv's Olimpiyskyi National Sports Complex.

During the Soviet era (before 1991), only three stadiums in Ukraine were used for official games:

- Olimpiysky NSC in Kyiv (known then as Republican Stadium)
- BSS Central Stadium in Odesa, the predecessor of Chornomorets
- Lokomotiv Stadium in Simferopol

Since May 2022, due to the Russian invasion of Ukraine, home game matches have been taking place in various cities across Europe:Łódź, Kraków, Wrocław Poland;Trnava Slovakia; Prague Czech Republic; Leverkusen, Stuttgart Germany; Murcia, Valencia Spain

=== Home venue record ===
Since Ukraine's first fixture (29 April 1992 vs. Hungary) they have played their home games at 11 different stadiums.

| Venue | City | Played | Won | Drawn | Lost | GF | GA | Points per game |
|---|---|---|---|---|---|---|---|---|
| Olimpiyskiy National Sports Complex | Kyiv | 62 | 29 | 21 | 12 | 88 | 52 | 1.74 |
| Valeriy Lobanovskyi Dynamo Stadium | Kyiv | 20 | 13 | 5 | 2 | 38 | 15 | 2.2 |
| Arena Lviv | Lviv | 14 | 11 | 3 | 0 | 33 | 6 | 2.57 |
| Metalist Oblast Sports Complex | Kharkiv | 13 | 7 | 2 | 4 | 21 | 9 | 1.77 |
| Ukraina Stadium | Lviv | 6 | 6 | 0 | 0 | 14 | 5 | 3 |
| Chornomorets Stadium | Odesa | 6 | 4 | 2 | 0 | 7 | 3 | 2.33 |
| Donbas Arena | Donetsk | 5 | 0 | 1 | 4 | 2 | 9 | 0.2 |
| Dnipro-Arena | Dnipro | 4 | 3 | 1 | 0 | 5 | 2 | 2.5 |
| Shakhtar Stadium | Donetsk | 2 | 0 | 1 | 1 | 0 | 2 | 0.5 |
| Slavutych-Arena | Zaporizhzhia | 1 | 1 | 0 | 0 | 1 | 0 | 3 |
| Meteor Stadium | Dnipro | 1 | 0 | 1 | 0 | 2 | 2 | 1 |
| Avanhard Stadium | Uzhhorod | 1 | 0 | 0 | 1 | 1 | 3 | 0 |
| Totals | | 135 | 74 | 37 | 24 | 212 | 108 | 1.92 |

Last updated: 11 November 2021. Statistics include official FIFA-recognised matches only.

== Kits and sponsors ==
=== Kit history and evolution ===
Before 5 February 2009, Ukraine wore a Lotto kit, which was famously featured during their quarter-final run at the 2006 FIFA World Cup. The team subsequently transitioned to Adidas, debuting a 2009 design characterized by a yellow base and a distinctive "snake sash" across the chest. This design was replaced on 29 March 2010 by a more traditional adidas template, which served the team through Euro 2012 and Euro 2016. In 2017, the Ukrainian Association of Football (UAF) switched technical partners to the Spanish brand Joma, a partnership that spanned seven years and included the team’s quarter-final appearance at Euro 2020. The Joma era concluded in late 2024, when Ukraine officially returned to Adidas as its exclusive supplier. The new partnership was inaugurated in October 2024 with the launch of the home and away kits for the 2024/25 season, which were first worn during the October window of the UEFA Nations League.

Former crest

=== Sponsors ===
Marketing for the Football Federation of Ukraine is conducted by the Ukraine Football International (UFI).

- Title sponsor: Epicentr (since 2013)
- Premium (General) sponsors: Chernihivske (since 1998)
- Official sponsors: Henkel (Ukraine), Adidas, Airline "MAU" (Ukraine International Airlines), NIKO (official Mitsubishi distributor in Ukraine), Boris clinic, Tour agency "Love Cyprus", Resort center "Grand Admiral Club"

Former title and general sponsors included Ukrtelecom, Kyivstar, Nordex (Austria), and Geoton.

| Kit supplier | Period |
|---|---|
| (United Kingdom) Umbro | 1992–1997 |
| (Germany) Puma | 1998–2002 |
| (Italy) Lotto | 2003–2008 |
| (Germany) Adidas | 2009–2016 |
| (Spain) Joma | 2017–2024 |
| (Germany) Adidas | 2024–present |

== Results and fixtures ==
The following is a list of match results in the last 12 months, as well as any future matches that have been scheduled.

Win Draw Loss Fixture

=== 2026 ===
| 26 March 2026 World Cup qualification play-offs | Ukraine | 1–3 | Sweden | Valencia, Spain (Note: Due to the Russian invasion of Ukraine, Ukraine are required to play their home matches at neutral venues until further notice.) |
| 20:45 UTC+1 | Ponomarenko 90' | Report | Gyökeres 6', 51', 73' (pen.) | Stadium: Estadio Ciutat de València; Attendance: 18,846; Referee: João Pinheiro (Portugal) |

| 31 March Friendly | Ukraine | 1–0 | Albania | Valencia, Spain |
| 20:45 | Hutsulyak 46' | Report | | Stadium: Estadio Ciutat de València; Attendance: 7,100; Referee: Juan Martínez Munuera (Spain) |

| 31 May Friendly | Poland | 0–2 | Ukraine | Wrocław, Poland |
| 20:45 UTC+2 | | Report | Yaremchuk 34'; Yarmolenko 44' | Stadium: Wrocław Stadium; Attendance: 37,904; Referee: Filip Glova (Slovakia) |

| 7 June Friendly | Denmark | 2–1 (Abandoned) | Ukraine | Odense, Denmark |
| 18:30 UTC+2 | Dorgu 13'; Mæhle 36' | Report | Tsyhankov 44' | Stadium: Odense Stadium; Referee: Sigurd Kringstad (Norway) |
Note: The match was abandoned after the 79th minute, following Denmark midfielder Christian Eriksen suffering an on-field collapse.

| 25 September 2026–27 UEFA Nations League | Hungary | 0–1 | Ukraine | Budapest, Hungary |
| 20:45 UTC+2 | | Report | Sikan 42' | Stadium: Puskás Aréna; Attendance: 56,799; Referee: Jarred Gillett (England) |

| 28 September 2026–27 UEFA Nations League | Georgia | 0–0 | Ukraine | Tbilisi, Georgia |
| 20:00 UTC+4 | | Report | | Stadium: Boris Paichadze Dinamo Arena; Attendance: 43,382; Referee: Aliyar Aghayev (Azerbaijan) |

| 2 October 2026–27 UEFA Nations League | Ukraine | 0–3 | Northern Ireland | Trnava, Slovakia |
| 20:45 UTC+2 | | Report | Brown 9', 61'; Price 22' | Stadium: Anton Malatinský Stadium; Attendance: 7,080; Referee: Jasper Vergoote (Belgium) |

| 5 October 2026–27 UEFA Nations League | Ukraine | 1–2 | Hungary | Trnava, Slovakia |
| 20:45 UTC+2 | Yaremchuk 84' | Report | Tóth 52'; Csinger 85' | Stadium: Anton Malatinský Stadium; Attendance: 7,910; Referee: Igor Pajač (Croatia) |

| 14 November 2026–27 UEFA Nations League | Northern Ireland | 1–0 | Ukraine | Belfast, Northern Ireland |
| 19:45 UTC+0 | Devlin 68' | Report | | Stadium: Windsor Park; Referee: François Letexier (France) |

| 17 November 2026–27 UEFA Nations League | Ukraine | 1–0 | Georgia | Košice, Slovakia |
| 20:45 UTC+1 | Sikan 1' | Report | | Stadium: Košická futbalová aréna Attendance: 5,400; Referee: Martin Matoša (Slovenia) |

== Coaching staff ==
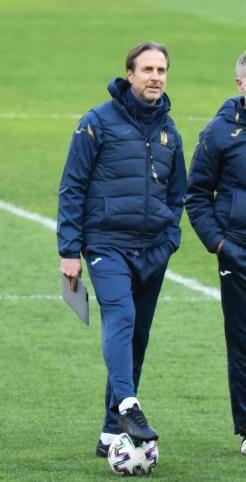
Current head coach Andrea Maldera

As of 18 May 2026

| Position | Name |
|---|---|
| Head coach | (Italy) Andrea Maldera |
Assistant coach
| Assistant coach | (Italy) Pasquale Catalano |
| Assistant coach | (Ukraine) Taras Stepanenko |
| Assistant coach | (Ukraine) Volodymyr Yezerskyi |
| Goalkeeping coach | (Ukraine) Rustam Khudzhamov |
| Fitness coach | (Italy) Franco Giammartino |

=== Coaching history ===
As of 15 November 2026

| No. | Manager | Nation | Ukraine career | G | W | D | L | GF | GA | GD | Win % | Qualifying cycle | Final tour |
|---|---|---|---|---|---|---|---|---|---|---|---|---|---|
| 1 | Viktor Prokopenko | (Ukraine) | 1992 | 3 | 0 | 1 | 2 | 2 | 5 | −3 | 0.00 | | |
| C | Mykola Pavlov Leonid Tkachenko | (Ukraine) | 1992 | 1 | 0 | 1 | 0 | 1 | 1 | +0 | 0.00 | | |
| 2 | Oleh Bazylevych | (Ukraine) | 1993–1994 | 11 | 4 | 3 | 4 | 13 | 14 | −1 | 36.36 | 1996 | |
| C | Mykola Pavlov Volodymyr Muntyan | (Ukraine) | 1994 | 2 | 0 | 0 | 2 | 0 | 3 | −3 | 0.00 | | |
| C | Yozhef Sabo | (Ukraine) | 1994 | 2 | 1 | 1 | 0 | 3 | 0 | +3 | 50.00 | 1996 | |
| 3 | Anatoliy Konkov | (Ukraine) | 1995 | 7 | 3 | 0 | 4 | 8 | 13 | −5 | 42.86 | 1996 | |
| 4 | Yozhef Sabo | (Ukraine) | 1996–1999 | 32 | 15 | 11 | 6 | 44 | 26 | +18 | 46.88 | 1998, 2000 | |
| 5 | Valeriy Lobanovskyi | (Ukraine) | 2000–2001 | 18 | 6 | 7 | 5 | 20 | 20 | +0 | 33.33 | 2002 | |
| 6 | Leonid Buryak | (Ukraine) | 2002–2003 | 19 | 5 | 6 | 8 | 18 | 23 | −5 | 26.32 | 2004 | |
| 7 | Oleg Blokhin | (Ukraine) | 2003–2007 | 46 | 21 | 14 | 11 | 65 | 40 | +25 | 45.65 | 2006, 2008 | 2006 |
| 8 | Oleksiy Mykhaylychenko | (Ukraine) | 2008–2009 | 21 | 12 | 5 | 4 | 31 | 16 | +15 | 57.14 | 2010 | |
| 9 | Myron Markevych | (Ukraine) | 2010 | 4 | 3 | 1 | 0 | 9 | 3 | +6 | 75.00 | | |
| C | Yuriy Kalytvyntsev | (Ukraine) | 2010–2011 | 8 | 1 | 5 | 2 | 10 | 13 | −3 | 12.50 | | |
| 10 | Oleg Blokhin | (Ukraine) | 2011–2012 | 18 | 7 | 3 | 8 | 27 | 28 | −1 | 38.89 | 2014 | 2012 |
| C | Andriy Bal | (Ukraine) | 2012 | 2 | 0 | 1 | 1 | 0 | 1 | −1 | 0.00 | 2014 | |
| C | Oleksandr Zavarov | (Ukraine) | 2012 | 1 | 1 | 0 | 0 | 1 | 0 | +1 | 100.00 | | |
| 11 | Mykhaylo Fomenko | (Ukraine) | 2012–2016 | 37 | 24 | 6 | 7 | 67 | 22 | +45 | 64.86 | 2014, 2016 | 2016 |
| 12 | Andriy Shevchenko | (Ukraine) | 2016–2021 | 51 | 25 | 13 | 13 | 71 | 61 | +10 | 49.02 | 2018, 2020, 2022 | 2020 |
| 13 | Oleksandr Petrakov | (Ukraine) | 2021 (Note: Oleksandr Petrakov took over as caretaker for seven games, until he was formally appointed full-time on 17 November 2021.)–2023 | 15 | 6 | 7 | 2 | 23 | 13 | +10 | 40.00 | 2022 | |
| C | Ruslan Rotan | (Ukraine) | 2023 | 1 | 0 | 0 | 1 | 0 | 2 | −2 | 0.00 | 2024 | |
| 14 | Serhiy Rebrov | (Ukraine) | 2023–2026 | 34 | 16 | 8 | 10 | 52 | 49 | +3 | 47.06 | 2024, 2026 | 2024 |
| 15 | Andrea Maldera | (Italy) | 2026– | 6 | 2 | 1 | 3 | 4 | 5 | −1 | 33.33 | | |

== Players ==
=== Current squad ===
The following 25 players were called up for the 2026–27 UEFA Nations League matches against Northern Ireland and Georgia on November 14 and 17.

On November 5 Oleksandr Zubkov withdrew from the squad due to injury. Later that day, Vladyslav Vanat was called up from the reserve list and Mykola Shaparenko was added to the squad.

On November 9 Matviy Ponomarenko withdrew from the squad due to injury and was replaced by Artem Dovbyk from the reserve list.

Caps and goals updated as of 17 November 2026, after the match against Georgia.

| No. | Pos. | Player | Date of birth (age) | Caps | Goals | Club |
|---|---|---|---|---|---|---|
| 1 | GK | Heorhiy Yermakov | 28 March 2002 (age 24) | 0 | 0 | (Ukrainian Association of Football) Kharkiv |
| 12 | GK | Anatoliy Trubin | 1 August 2001 (age 25) | 32 | 0 | (Portuguese Football Federation) Benfica |
| 23 | GK | Dmytro Riznyk | 30 January 1999 (age 27) | 7 | 0 | (Ukrainian Association of Football) Shakhtar Donetsk |
| 2 | DF | Borys Krushynskyi | 10 May 2002 (age 24) | 0 | 0 | (Ukrainian Association of Football) Polissya Zhytomyr |
| 3 | DF | Eduard Sarapiy | 12 May 1999 (age 27) | 8 | 0 | (Ukrainian Association of Football) Polissya Zhytomyr |
| 4 | DF | Taras Mykhavko | 30 May 2005 (age 21) | 3 | 0 | (Ukrainian Association of Football) Dynamo Kyiv |
| 5 | DF | Valeriy Bondar | 27 February 1999 (age 27) | 12 | 0 | (Ukrainian Association of Football) Shakhtar Donetsk |
| 13 | DF | Illia Zabarnyi | 1 September 2002 (age 24) | 63 | 3 | (French Football Federation) Paris Saint-Germain |
| 15 | DF | Illya Krupskyi | 2 October 2004 (age 22) | 2 | 0 | (Ukrainian Association of Football) Kharkiv |
| 16 | DF | Vitaliy Mykolenko | 29 May 1999 (age 27) | 57 | 1 | (The Football Association) Everton |
| 22 | DF | Mykola Matviyenko | 2 May 1996 (age 30) | 88 | 0 | (Ukrainian Association of Football) Shakhtar Donetsk |
| 6 | MF | Yehor Yarmolyuk | 1 March 2004 (age 22) | 11 | 0 | (The Football Association) Brentford |
| 7 | MF | Oleksiy Kashchuk | 26 September 2000 (age 26) | 2 | 0 | (Association of Football Federations of Azerbaijan) Qarabağ |
| 8 | MF | Heorhiy Sudakov | 1 September 2002 (age 24) | 40 | 4 | (Portuguese Football Federation) Benfica |
| 10 | MF | Mykola Shaparenko | 4 October 1998 (age 28) | 52 | 2 | (Ukrainian Association of Football) Dynamo Kyiv |
| 18 | MF | Oleh Ocheretko | 25 May 2003 (age 23) | 14 | 1 | (Ukrainian Association of Football) Shakhtar Donetsk |
| 19 | MF | Yehor Nazaryna | 10 July 1997 (age 29) | 14 | 0 | (Ukrainian Association of Football) Shakhtar Donetsk |
| 20 | MF | Hennadiy Synchuk | 10 July 2006 (age 20) | 3 | 0 | (Canadian Soccer Association) Montréal |
| | MF | Oleksandr Andriyevskyi | 25 June 1994 (age 32) | 1 | 0 | (Ukrainian Association of Football) Polissya Zhytomyr |
| | MF | Ivan Varfolomeyev | 24 March 2004 (age 22) | 1 | 0 | (The Football Association) Lincoln City |
| 9 | FW | Roman Yaremchuk | 27 November 1995 (age 30) | 74 | 19 | (Hellenic Football Federation) Olympiacos |
| 11 | FW | Artem Dovbyk | 21 June 1997 (age 29) | 42 | 11 | (Italian Football Federation) Bologna |
| 14 | FW | Danylo Sikan | 16 April 2001 (age 25) | 12 | 3 | (Royal Belgian Football Association) Anderlecht |
| 17 | FW | Oleksandr Nazarenko | 1 February 2000 (age 26) | 7 | 0 | (Ukrainian Association of Football) Polissya Zhytomyr |
| 21 | FW | Ihor Krasnopir | 1 December 2002 (age 23) | 4 | 0 | (Ukrainian Association of Football) Polissya Zhytomyr |
| | FW | Vladyslav Vanat | 4 January 2002 (age 24) | 20 | 2 | (Royal Spanish Football Federation) Girona |

=== Recent call-ups ===
The following players have been called up for the team within the last 12 months.

| Pos. | Player | Date of birth (age) | Caps | Goals | Club | Latest call-up |
|---|---|---|---|---|---|---|
| GK | Heorhiy Bushchan | 31 May 1994 (age 32) | 18 | 0 | (Ukraine) Dynamo Kyiv | v. Northern Ireland, 14 November 2026 ^{RES} |
| GK | Ruslan Neshcheret | 22 January 2002 (age 24) | 0 | 0 | (Ukraine) Dynamo Kyiv | v. Northern Ireland, 14 November 2026 ^{RES} |
| GK | Andriy Lunin | 11 February 1999 (age 27) | 16 | 0 | (Spain) Real Madrid | v. Poland, 31 May 2026 ^{WD} |
| GK | Yevhen Volynets | 26 August 1993 (age 33) | 0 | 0 | (Ukraine) Polissya Zhytomyr | v. Sweden, 26 March 2026 ^{RES} |
| DF | Oleksandr Drambayev | 21 April 2001 (age 25) | 1 | 0 | (Ukraine) LNZ Cherkasy | v. Northern Ireland, 14 November 2026 ^{RES} |
| DF | Bohdan Mykhaylichenko | 21 March 1997 (age 29) | 15 | 0 | (Ukraine) Polissya Zhytomyr | v. Hungary, 5 October 2026 ^{INJ} |
| DF | Oleksandr Karavayev | 2 June 1992 (age 34) | 50 | 3 | (Ukraine) Shakhtar Donetsk | v. Hungary, 25 September 2026 ^{RES} |
| DF | Artem Shabanov | 7 March 1992 (age 34) | 2 | 0 | (Ukraine) Kharkiv | v. Hungary, 25 September 2026 ^{RES} |
| DF | Oleksandr Romanchuk | 16 December 1999 (age 26) | 1 | 0 | (Romania) Universitatea Craiova | v. Hungary, 25 September 2026 ^{RES} |
| DF | Roman Vantukh | 4 July 1998 (age 28) | 0 | 0 | (Ukraine) Karpaty Lviv | v. Hungary, 25 September 2026 ^{RES} |
| DF | Yukhym Konoplya | 26 August 1999 (age 27) | 27 | 2 | (Germany) Borussia Mönchengladbach | v. Albania, 31 March 2026 |
| DF | Oleksandr Tymchyk | 20 January 1997 (age 29) | 26 | 1 | (Ukraine) Dynamo Kyiv | v. Albania, 31 March 2026 |
| DF | Oleksandr Svatok | 27 September 1994 (age 32) | 11 | 0 | (United States) Austin FC | v. Albania, 31 March 2026 |
| DF | Oleksiy Sych | 1 April 2001 (age 25) | 2 | 0 | (Ukraine) Dynamo Kyiv | v. Sweden, 26 March 2026 ^{RES} |
| DF | Serhiy Chobotenko | 16 January 1997 (age 29) | 0 | 0 | (Ukraine) Polissya Zhytomyr | v. Sweden, 26 March 2026 ^{RES} |
| DF | Kostyantyn Vivcharenko | 10 June 2002 (age 24) | 0 | 0 | (Ukraine) Dynamo Kyiv | v. Sweden, 26 March 2026 ^{RES} |
| DF | Maksym Talovyerov | 28 June 2000 (age 26) | 8 | 0 | (England) Stoke City | v. Sweden, 26 March 2026 ^{INJ} |
| MF | Oleksandr Pikhalyonok | 7 May 1997 (age 29) | 15 | 0 | (Ukraine) Dynamo Kyiv | v. Northern Ireland, 14 November 2026 ^{RES} |
| MF | Volodymyr Brazhko | 23 January 2002 (age 24) | 11 | 0 | (Ukraine) Dynamo Kyiv | v. Northern Ireland, 14 November 2026 ^{RES} |
| MF | Artem Bondarenko | 21 August 2000 (age 26) | 5 | 0 | (Saudi Arabia) Al-Ahli Saudi | v. Northern Ireland, 14 November 2026 ^{RES} |
| MF | Viktor Tsyhankov | 15 November 1997 (age 29) | 71 | 14 | (Netherlands) Ajax | v. Hungary, 5 October 2026 |
| MF | Vladyslav Veleten | 1 October 2002 (age 24) | 2 | 0 | (Ukraine) Polissya Zhytomyr | v. Hungary, 5 October 2026 |
| MF | Dmytro Kryskiv | 6 October 2000 (age 26) | 3 | 0 | (Ukraine) Shakhtar Donetsk | v. Hungary, 25 September 2026 ^{RES} |
| MF | Ruslan Malinovskyi | 4 May 1993 (age 33) | 71 | 10 | (Turkey) Trabzonspor | v. Denmark, 7 June 2026 |
| MF | Danylo Ihnatenko | 13 March 1997 (age 29) | 6 | 1 | (Slovakia) Slovan Bratislava | v. Denmark, 7 June 2026 |
| MF | Nazar Voloshyn | 17 June 2003 (age 23) | 6 | 0 | (Ukraine) Dynamo Kyiv | v. Poland, 31 May 2026 ^{RES} |
| MF | Oleksiy Hutsulyak | 25 December 1997 (age 28) | 16 | 6 | Unattached | v. Poland, 31 May 2026 ^{INJ} |
| MF | Ivan Kalyuzhnyi | 21 January 1998 (age 28) | 14 | 1 | (Ukraine) Kharkiv | v. Albania, 31 March 2026 |
| FW | Oleksandr Zubkov | 3 August 1996 (age 30) | 47 | 3 | (Greece) AEK Athens | v. Northern Ireland, 14 November 2026 ^{INJ} |
| FW | Matviy Ponomarenko | 11 January 2006 (age 20) | 6 | 1 | (Ukraine) Dynamo Kyiv | v. Northern Ireland, 14 November 2026 ^{INJ} |
| FW | Timur Tutyerov | 11 June 2005 (age 21) | 0 | 0 | (England) Sunderland | v. Northern Ireland, 14 November 2026 ^{RES} |
| FW | Andriy Yarmolenko | 23 October 1989 (age 37) | 127 | 47 | (Ukraine) Dynamo Kyiv | v. Hungary, 5 October 2026 |
| FW | Maksym Khlan | 27 January 2003 (age 23) | 2 | 0 | (Poland) Górnik Zabrze | v. Hungary, 5 October 2026 |
| FW | Artem Stepanov | 10 August 2007 (age 19) | 0 | 0 | (Netherlands) Utrecht | v. Hungary, 25 September 2026 ^{INJ} |
Notes: ^{U21} = Called up from national U21 squad.; ^{WD} = Withdrew from squad for reason other than injury.; ^{INJ} = Not part of the current squad due to injury.; ^{RES} = Reserve squad (replaces a member of the squad in case of injury/unavailability).; ^{RET} = Retired from the national team.; ^{PRE} = Preliminary squad/standby.

=== Previous squads ===
- 2006 FIFA World Cup squad
- UEFA Euro 2012 squad
- UEFA Euro 2016 squad
- UEFA Euro 2020 squad
- UEFA Euro 2024 squad

== Player records ==
As of 17 November 2026
Players in bold are still active with Ukraine.

=== Most appearances ===
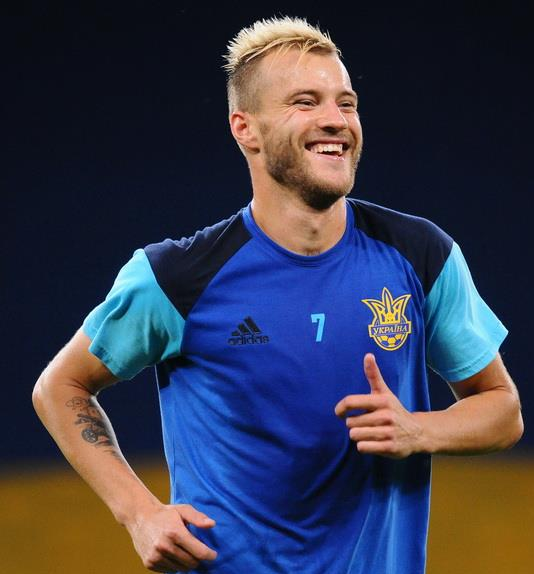
Andriy Yarmolenko is Ukraine's second-most capped player with 126 appearances.

| Rank | Player | Caps | Goals | Period |
|---|---|---|---|---|
| 1 | Anatoliy Tymoshchuk | 144 | 4 | 2000–2016 |
| 2 | **Andriy Yarmolenko** | 127 | 47 | 2009–present |
| 3 | Andriy Shevchenko | 111 | 48 | 1995–2012 |
| 4 | Andriy Pyatov | 102 | 0 | 2007–2022 |
| 5 | Ruslan Rotan | 100 | 8 | 2003–2018 |
| 6 | Oleh Husiev | 98 | 13 | 2003–2016 |
| 7 | Oleksandr Shovkovskyi | 92 | 0 | 1994–2012 |
| 8 | **Mykola Matviyenko** | 88 | 0 | 2017–present |
| 9 | Yevhen Konoplyanka | 87 | 21 | 2010–2023 |
| 9 | Taras Stepanenko | 87 | 4 | 2010–2024 |

=== Top goalscorers ===
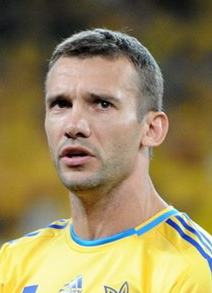
Andriy Shevchenko is Ukraine's top scorer with 48 goals.

| Rank | Player | Goals | Caps | Average | Period |
|---|---|---|---|---|---|
| 1 | Andriy Shevchenko | 48 | 111 | 0.43 | 1995–2012 |
| 2 | **Andriy Yarmolenko** | 47 | 127 | 0.37 | 2009–present |
| 3 | Yevhen Konoplyanka | 21 | 87 | 0.24 | 2010–2023 |
| 4 | **Roman Yaremchuk** | 19 | 74 | 0.26 | 2018–present |
| 5 | Serhiy Rebrov | 15 | 75 | 0.2 | 1992–2006 |
| 6 | **Viktor Tsyhankov** | 14 | 71 | 0.21 | 2016–present |
| 7 | Oleh Husiev | 13 | 98 | 0.13 | 2003–2016 |
| 8 | Serhiy Nazarenko | 12 | 56 | 0.21 | 2003–2012 |
| 8 | **Oleksandr Zinchenko** | 12 | 75 | 0.16 | 2015–present |
| 10 | **Artem Dovbyk** | 11 | 42 | 0.27 | 2021–present |
| 10 | Yevhen Seleznyov | 11 | 58 | 0.19 | 2008–2018 |

=== Most capped goalkeepers ===
As of 17 November 2026

| Rank | Player | Caps | Wins | GA | Av GA | Period |
|---|---|---|---|---|---|---|
| 1 | Andriy Pyatov | 102 | 51 | 83 | 0.814 | 2007–2022 |
| 2 | Oleksandr Shovkovskyi | 92 | 38 | 80 | 0.87 | 1994–2012 |
| 3 | **Anatoliy Trubin** | 32 | 9 | 44 | 1.379 | 2021–present |
| 4 | **Heorhiy Bushchan** | 18 | 5 | 30 | 1.667 | 2020–present |
| 5 | **Andriy Lunin** | 16 | 9 | 16 | 1 | 2018–present |
| 6 | Oleh Suslov | 12 | 7 | 15 | 1.25 | 1994–1997 |
| 7 | Vitaliy Reva | 9 | 3 | 10 | 1.111 | 2001–2003 |
| 8 | Andriy Dykan | 8 | 5 | 11 | 1.375 | 2010–2012 |
| 8 | Maksym Levytskyi | 8 | 1 | 10 | 1.25 | 2000–2002 |
| 10 | Denys Boyko | 7 | 3 | 7 | 1 | 2014–2021 |
| 10 | Dmytro Tyapushkin | 7 | 1 | 11 | 1.571 | 1994–1995 |
| 10 | **Dmytro Riznyk** | 7 | 3 | 5 | 0.6 | 2021–present |

=== Captains ===
As of 17 November 2026

| Rank | Player | Captain Caps | Total Caps | Period |
|---|---|---|---|---|
| 1 | Andriy Shevchenko | 58 | 111 | 1995–2012 |
| 2 | Anatoliy Tymoshchuk | 41 | 144 | 2000–2016 |
| 3 | Oleh Luzhnyi | 39 | 52 | 1992–2003 |
| 4 | **Andriy Yarmolenko** | 31 | 127 | 2009–present |
| 5 | Ruslan Rotan | 24 | 100 | 2003–2018 |
| 5 | Andriy Pyatov | 24 | 102 | 2007–2022 |
| 7 | **Mykola Matviyenko** | 18 | 88 | 2017–present |
| 8 | Yuriy Kalitvintsev | 13 | 22 | 1995–1999 |
| 8 | Oleksandr Holovko | 13 | 58 | 1995–2004 |
| 10 | Oleksandr Shovkovskyi | 12 | 92 | 1994–2012 |

== Competitive record ==
=== FIFA World Cup ===
Champions Runners-up Third place

| FIFA World Cup record | | | | | | | | | | Qualification record | | | | | | | |
| Year | Round | Position | Pld | W | D* | L | GF | GA | Squad | Pld | W | D | L | GF | GA | → | Outcome |
|---|---|---|---|---|---|---|---|---|---|---|---|---|---|---|---|---|---|
| 1930 to 1990 | Part of Soviet Union | | | | | | | | | Part of Soviet Union | | | | | | | |
| as Ukraine | | | | | | | | | | as Ukraine | | | | | | | |
| (United States) 1994 | Not eligible to participate. (Note: Ukraine was part of the Soviet Union until 1991. Following its independence, the country established its own football association and became a member of FIFA in 1992. FIFA adopted a decision not to allow to participate in the 1994 FIFA World Cup the national teams of those former Soviet republic that did not participate in the qualification draw on 8 December 1991. A proposition of Ukraine to arrange a separate tournament for all successors of the Soviet Union and supported by Georgia and Armenia was blocked by Russia.) | | | | | | | | | Not eligible to participate. | | | | | | 1994 | Qualifying spot not granted by FIFA |
| (France) 1998 | Did not qualify | | | | | | | | | | | | | | | | |
| (France) 1998 | Did not qualify | | | | | | | | | 12 | 6 | 3 | 3 | 11 | 9 | 1998 | 2nd in qualifying group 9, lost to Croatia 0:2 1:1(H) (agg.1-3) in play-off |
| (South Korea) (Japan) 2002 | Did not qualify | | | | | | | | | 12 | 4 | 6 | 2 | 15 | 13 | 2002 | 2nd in qualifying group 5, lost to Germany 1:1(H) 1:4 (agg.2-5) in play-off |
| (Germany) 2006 | Quarter-finals | 8th | 5 | 2 | 1 | 2 | 5 | 7 | Squad | 12 | 7 | 4 | 1 | 18 | 7 | 2006 | 1st in qualifying group 2 |
| (South Africa) 2010 | Did not qualify | | | | | | | | | 12 | 6 | 4 | 2 | 21 | 7 | 2010 | 2nd in qualifying group 6, lost to Greece 0:0 0:1(H) (agg.0-1) in play-off |
| (Brazil) 2014 | Did not qualify | | | | | | | | | 12 | 7 | 3 | 2 | 30 | 7 | 2014 | 2nd in qualifying group H, lost to France 2:0(H) 0:3 (agg.2-3) in play-off |
| (Russia) 2018 | Did not qualify | | | | | | | | | 10 | 5 | 2 | 3 | 13 | 9 | 2018 | 3rd in qualifying group I |
| (Qatar) 2022 | Did not qualify | | | | | | | | | 10 | 3 | 6 | 1 | 14 | 10 | 2022 | 2nd in qualifying group D, win to Scotland 3:1, lost to Wales 0:1 in play-off |
| (Canada) (Mexico) (United States) 2026 | Did not qualify | | | | | | | | | 7 | 3 | 1 | 3 | 11 | 14 | 2026 | 2nd in qualifying group D, lost to Sweden 1:3(H) in play-off |
| (Morocco) (Portugal) (Spain) 2030 | To be determined | | | | | | | | | To be determined | | | | | | 2030 | |
| (Saudi Arabia) 2034 | To be determined | | | | | | | | | To be determined | | | | | | 2034 | |
| Total:1/9 | Quarter-finals | 8th | 5 | 2 | 1 | 2 | 5 | 7 | – | 87 | 41 | 29 | 17 | 133 | 76 | | |

* Denotes draws include knock-out matches decided on penalty kicks.

=== UEFA European Championship ===
Champions Runners-up Third place

| UEFA European Championship record | | | | | | | | | Qualification record | | | | | | | |
| Year | Round | Position | Pld | W | D* | L | GF | GA | Pld | W | D* | L | GF | GA | → | Outcome |
| Part of Soviet Union and CIS (1960 to 1992) | | | | | | | | | Part of Soviet Union and CIS (1960 to 1992) | | | | | | | |
| as Ukraine | | | | | | | | | as Ukraine | | | | | | | |
|---|---|---|---|---|---|---|---|---|---|---|---|---|---|---|---|---|
| (England) 1996 | Did not qualify | | | | | | | | 10 | 4 | 1 | 5 | 11 | 15 | 1996 | 4th in qualifying group 4 |
| (Belgium) (Netherlands) 2000 | Did not qualify | | | | | | | | 12 | 5 | 6 | 1 | 16 | 7 | 2000 | 2nd in qualifying group 4, lost to Slovenia in play-off |
| (Portugal) 2004 | Did not qualify | | | | | | | | 8 | 2 | 4 | 2 | 11 | 10 | 2004 | 3rd in qualifying group 6 |
| (Austria) (Switzerland) 2008 | Did not qualify | | | | | | | | 12 | 5 | 2 | 5 | 18 | 16 | 2008 | 4th in qualifying group B |
| (Poland) (Ukraine) 2012 | Group stage | 12th | 3 | 1 | 0 | 2 | 2 | 4 | Host nation | | | | | | 2012 | Qualified as host nation |
| (France) 2016 | Group stage | 24th | 3 | 0 | 0 | 3 | 0 | 5 | 12 | 7 | 2 | 3 | 17 | 5 | 2016 | 3rd in qualifying group C, won against Slovenia in play-off |
| (Europe) 2020 | Quarter-finals | 8th | 5 | 2 | 0 | 3 | 6 | 10 | 8 | 6 | 2 | 0 | 17 | 4 | 2020 | Winner of qualifying group B |
| (Germany) 2024 | Group stage | 17th | 3 | 1 | 1 | 1 | 2 | 4 | 10 | 6 | 2 | 2 | 15 | 10 | 2024 | 3rd in qualifying group C, won against Bosnia and Herzegovina and Iceland in play-offs |
| (England) (Scotland) (Republic of Ireland) (Wales) 2028 | To be determined | | | | | | | | To be determined | | | | | | 2028 | |
| (Italy) (Turkey) 2032 | To be determined | | | | | | | | To be determined | | | | | | 2032 | |
| Total:4/8 | Quarter-finals | 8th | 14 | 4 | 1 | 9 | 10 | 23 | 72 | 35 | 19 | 18 | 105 | 67 | | |

=== UEFA Nations League ===
UEFA Nations League record
| Season | Division | Group | Pos. | Pld | W | D | L | GF | GA | P/R | RK |
|---|---|---|---|---|---|---|---|---|---|---|---|
| 2018–19 | B | 1 | 1st | 4 | 3 | 0 | 1 | 5 | 5 | ▲ | 14th |
| 2020–21 | A | 4 | 4th | 6 | 2 | 0 | 4 | 5 | 13 | ▼ | 13th |
| 2022–23 | B | 1 | 2nd | 6 | 3 | 2 | 1 | 10 | 4 | Same position | 22nd |
| 2024–25 | B | 1 | 2nd | 6 | 2 | 2 | 2 | 8 | 8 | Same position | 24th |
| 2024–25 | B | Promotion play-off | | 2 | 1 | 0 | 1 | 3 | 4 | Same position | 24th |
| 2026–27 | B | 2 | 3rd | 6 | 2 | 1 | 3 | 3 | 6 | Same position | 25th |
| 2028–29 | B | To be determined | | | | | | | | | |
| Total | | | | 30 | 13 | 5 | 12 | 34 | 40 | 13th | |

== Head-to-head record ==
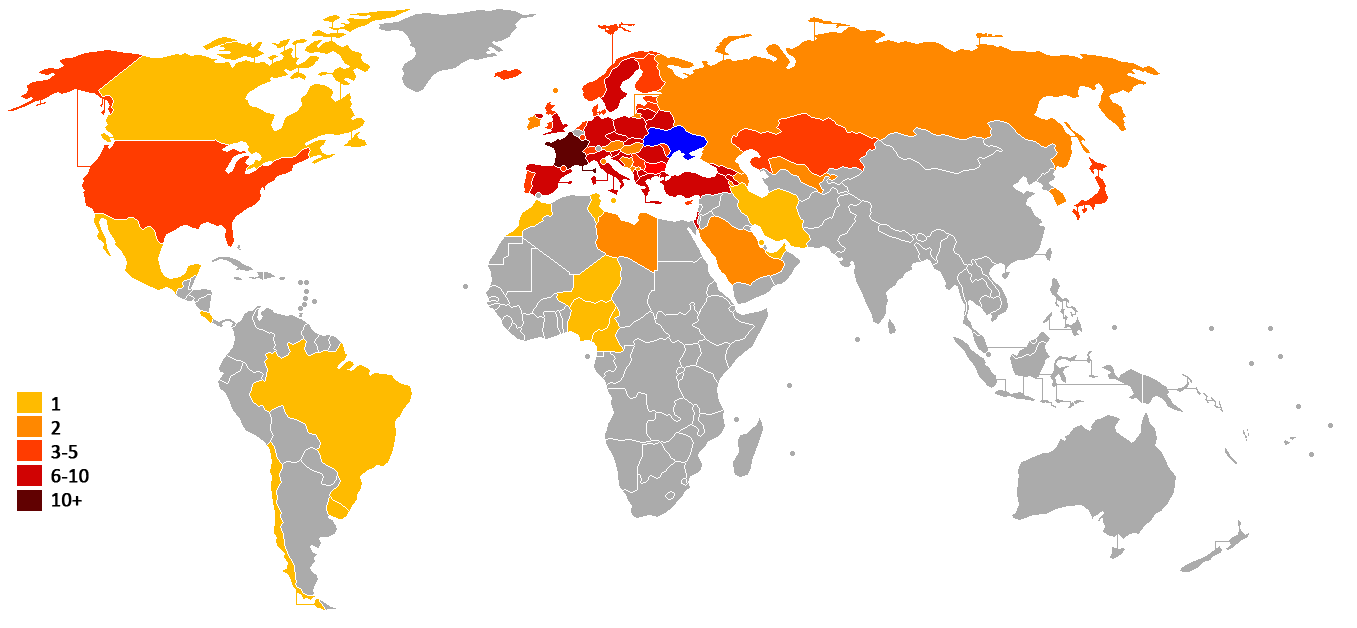
World Map of Ukraine's opponents

The following table shows Ukraine's all-time international record, correct as of 5 October 2026.

Key
| Positive balance (more wins) |
| Neutral balance (equal W/L ratio) |
| Negative balance (more losses) |

| Against | Confederation | Played | Won | Drawn | Lost | GF | GA | GD |
|---|---|---|---|---|---|---|---|---|
| Albania | UEFA | 9 | 7 | 1 | 1 | 17 | 7 | +10 |
| Andorra | UEFA | 4 | 4 | 0 | 0 | 17 | 0 | +17 |
| Armenia | UEFA | 10 | 7 | 3 | 0 | 25 | 8 | +17 |
| Austria | UEFA | 3 | 1 | 0 | 2 | 4 | 5 | -1 |
| Azerbaijan | UEFA | 4 | 2 | 2 | 0 | 9 | 2 | +7 |
| Bahrain | AFC | 1 | 0 | 1 | 0 | 1 | 1 | 0 |
| Belarus | UEFA | 9 | 5 | 3 | 1 | 12 | 5 | +7 |
| Belgium | UEFA | 3 | 1 | 1 | 1 | 3 | 4 | -1 |
| Bosnia and Herzegovina | UEFA | 3 | 2 | 1 | 0 | 5 | 2 | +3 |
| Brazil | CONMEBOL | 1 | 0 | 0 | 1 | 0 | 2 | -2 |
| Bulgaria | UEFA | 6 | 3 | 3 | 0 | 8 | 3 | +5 |
| Cameroon | CAF | 1 | 0 | 1 | 0 | 0 | 0 | 0 |
| Canada | CONCACAF | 2 | 0 | 1 | 1 | 4 | 6 | -2 |
| Chile | CONMEBOL | 1 | 1 | 0 | 0 | 2 | 1 | +1 |
| Costa Rica | CONCACAF | 1 | 1 | 0 | 0 | 4 | 0 | +4 |
| Croatia | UEFA | 9 | 1 | 3 | 5 | 5 | 15 | -10 |
| Cyprus | UEFA | 4 | 2 | 1 | 1 | 9 | 5 | +4 |
| Czech Republic | UEFA | 7 | 2 | 3 | 2 | 7 | 10 | -3 |
| Denmark | UEFA | 4 | 1 | 1 | 2 | 3 | 4 | -1 |
| England | UEFA | 10 | 1 | 3 | 6 | 4 | 16 | -12 |
| Estonia | UEFA | 5 | 5 | 0 | 0 | 11 | 0 | +11 |
| Faroe Islands | UEFA | 2 | 2 | 0 | 0 | 7 | 0 | +7 |
| Finland | UEFA | 4 | 3 | 1 | 0 | 6 | 3 | +3 |
| France | UEFA | 14 | 1 | 5 | 8 | 8 | 29 | -21 |
| Georgia | UEFA | 12 | 7 | 5 | 0 | 18 | 7 | +11 |
| Germany | UEFA | 10 | 0 | 5 | 5 | 10 | 20 | -10 |
| Greece | UEFA | 6 | 2 | 2 | 2 | 4 | 3 | +1 |
| Hungary | UEFA | 4 | 1 | 0 | 3 | 4 | 7 | -3 |
| Iceland | UEFA | 7 | 4 | 2 | 1 | 12 | 7 | +5 |
| Iran | AFC | 1 | 0 | 0 | 1 | 0 | 1 | -1 |
| Israel | UEFA | 6 | 2 | 3 | 1 | 7 | 5 | +2 |
| Italy | UEFA | 10 | 0 | 3 | 7 | 4 | 17 | -13 |
| Japan | AFC | 3 | 2 | 0 | 1 | 3 | 2 | +1 |
| Kazakhstan | UEFA | 6 | 4 | 2 | 0 | 12 | 6 | +6 |
| Kosovo | UEFA | 2 | 2 | 0 | 0 | 5 | 0 | +5 |
| Latvia | UEFA | 3 | 2 | 1 | 0 | 3 | 1 | +2 |
| Libya | CAF | 2 | 1 | 1 | 0 | 4 | 1 | +3 |
| Lithuania | UEFA | 10 | 7 | 1 | 2 | 20 | 8 | +12 |
| Luxembourg | UEFA | 5 | 5 | 0 | 0 | 12 | 1 | +11 |
| Malta | UEFA | 3 | 2 | 0 | 1 | 4 | 2 | +2 |
| Mexico | CONCACAF | 1 | 0 | 0 | 1 | 1 | 2 | -1 |
| Moldova | UEFA | 6 | 4 | 2 | 0 | 10 | 3 | +7 |
| Montenegro | UEFA | 2 | 1 | 0 | 1 | 4 | 1 | +3 |
| Morocco | CAF | 1 | 0 | 1 | 0 | 0 | 0 | 0 |
| Netherlands | UEFA | 3 | 0 | 1 | 2 | 3 | 7 | -4 |
| New Zealand | OFC | 1 | 1 | 0 | 0 | 2 | 1 | +1 |
| Niger | CAF | 1 | 1 | 0 | 0 | 2 | 1 | +1 |
| Nigeria | CAF | 1 | 0 | 1 | 0 | 2 | 2 | 0 |
| Northern Ireland | UEFA | 7 | 3 | 2 | 2 | 4 | 6 | –2 |
| North Macedonia | UEFA | 7 | 5 | 1 | 1 | 10 | 4 | +6 |
| Norway | UEFA | 5 | 4 | 1 | 0 | 5 | 0 | +5 |
| Poland | UEFA | 11 | 4 | 2 | 5 | 12 | 14 | -2 |
| Portugal | UEFA | 4 | 2 | 1 | 1 | 4 | 3 | +1 |
| Republic of Ireland | UEFA | 2 | 1 | 1 | 0 | 2 | 1 | +1 |
| Romania | UEFA | 7 | 2 | 1 | 4 | 10 | 17 | -7 |
| Russia | UEFA | 2 | 1 | 1 | 0 | 4 | 3 | +1 |
| San Marino | UEFA | 2 | 2 | 0 | 0 | 17 | 0 | +17 |
| Saudi Arabia | AFC | 2 | 1 | 1 | 0 | 5 | 1 | +4 |
| Scotland | UEFA | 5 | 2 | 1 | 2 | 6 | 7 | -1 |
| Serbia | UEFA | 7 | 6 | 1 | 0 | 16 | 3 | +13 |
| Slovakia | UEFA | 10 | 5 | 3 | 2 | 13 | 12 | +1 |
| Slovenia | UEFA | 6 | 1 | 3 | 2 | 7 | 7 | 0 |
| South Korea | AFC | 2 | 0 | 0 | 2 | 0 | 3 | -3 |
| Spain | UEFA | 7 | 1 | 1 | 5 | 4 | 14 | -10 |
| Sweden | UEFA | 6 | 3 | 1 | 2 | 7 | 7 | 0 |
| Switzerland | UEFA | 3 | 1 | 2 | 0 | 4 | 3 | +1 |
| Tunisia | CAF | 1 | 1 | 0 | 0 | 1 | 0 | +1 |
| Turkey | UEFA | 9 | 2 | 3 | 4 | 9 | 11 | -2 |
| United Arab Emirates | AFC | 1 | 0 | 1 | 0 | 1 | 1 | 0 |
| United States | CONCACAF | 4 | 3 | 1 | 0 | 5 | 1 | +4 |
| Uruguay | CONMEBOL | 1 | 0 | 0 | 1 | 2 | 3 | -1 |
| Uzbekistan | AFC | 2 | 2 | 0 | 0 | 4 | 1 | +3 |
| Wales | UEFA | 4 | 1 | 2 | 1 | 3 | 3 | 0 |
| Total: 73 nations | FIFA | 340 | 154 | 94 | 92 | 468 | 307 | +161 |

== FIFA Ranking history ==
As of 28 September 2026.

| 1992 EU | 1993 | 1994 WC | 1995 | 1996 EU | 1997 | 1998 WC | 1999 | 2000 EU | 2001 | 2002 WC | 2003 | 2004 EU | 2005 | 2006 WC |
|---|---|---|---|---|---|---|---|---|---|---|---|---|---|---|
| 129 | 90 ▲ | 77 ▲ | 71 ▲ | 59 ▲ | 49 ▲ | 47 ▲ | 27 ▲ | 34 ▼ | 45 ▼ | 45 | 60 ▼ | 57 ▲ | 40 ▲ | 13 ▲ |
| 2007 | 2008 EU | 2009 | 2010 WC | 2011 | 2012 EU | 2013 | 2014 WC | 2015 | 2016 EU | 2017 | 2018 WC | 2019 | 2020 EU | 2021 |
| 30 ▼ | 15 ▲ | 22 ▼ | 34 ▼ | 55 ▼ | 47 ▲ | 18 ▲ | 25 ▼ | 29 ▼ | 30 ▼ | 35 ▼ | 28 ▲ | 24 ▲ | 24 | 25 ▼ |
| 2022 WC | 2023 | 2024 EU | 2025 | 2026 WC | | | | | | | | | | |
| 26 ▼ | 22 ▲ | 24 ▼ | 27 ▼ | 36 ▼ | | | | | | | | | | |

== Honours ==
=== Friendly ===
- Cyprus International Football Tournament
  - Champions (2): 2009, 2011

== See also ==
- Ukraine national under-21 football team
- Ukraine national under-19 football team
- Ukraine national under-18 football team
- Ukraine national under-17 football team
- Ukraine national under-16 football team
- Ukrainians on the Soviet Union national football team
