= Anatoliy Saulevych =

Ukrainian footballer (1959–2021)

Personal information
- Full name: Anatoliy Volodymyrovych Saulevych
- Date of birth: 26 March 1959
- Place of birth: Kyiv, Ukrainian SSR
- Date of death: 13 November 2021 (aged 62)
- Place of death: Lviv, Ukraine
- Height: 1.75 m (5 ft 9 in)
- Position: Defender

Youth career
- Sportinternat Kyiv

Senior career*
Years	Team	Apps	(Gls)
1976–1981	Karpaty Lviv	118	(8)
1982–1985	SKA Karpaty Lviv	117	(7)
1986	Nyva Ternopil	33	(4)
1987–1988	Podillya Khmelnytskyi	96	(13)
1989	Karpaty Lviv	40	(2)
1990–1991	Zaria Bălți	80	(9)
1992	Halychyna Drohobych	24	(0)

International career
1976–1977	Soviet Union U18	?	(?)

Managerial career
- Karpaty Lviv youth (assistant)
Medal record
Men's football
Representing Soviet Union
UEFA European U-18 Championships
Bronze medal – third place	1977 Belgium
- * Club domestic league appearances and goals

Anatoliy Saulevych (Ukrainian: Анатолій Володимирович Саулевич; 26 March 1959 – 13 November 2021) was a Ukrainian professional footballer who played as defender and a youth football coach.

== Playing and coaching career ==
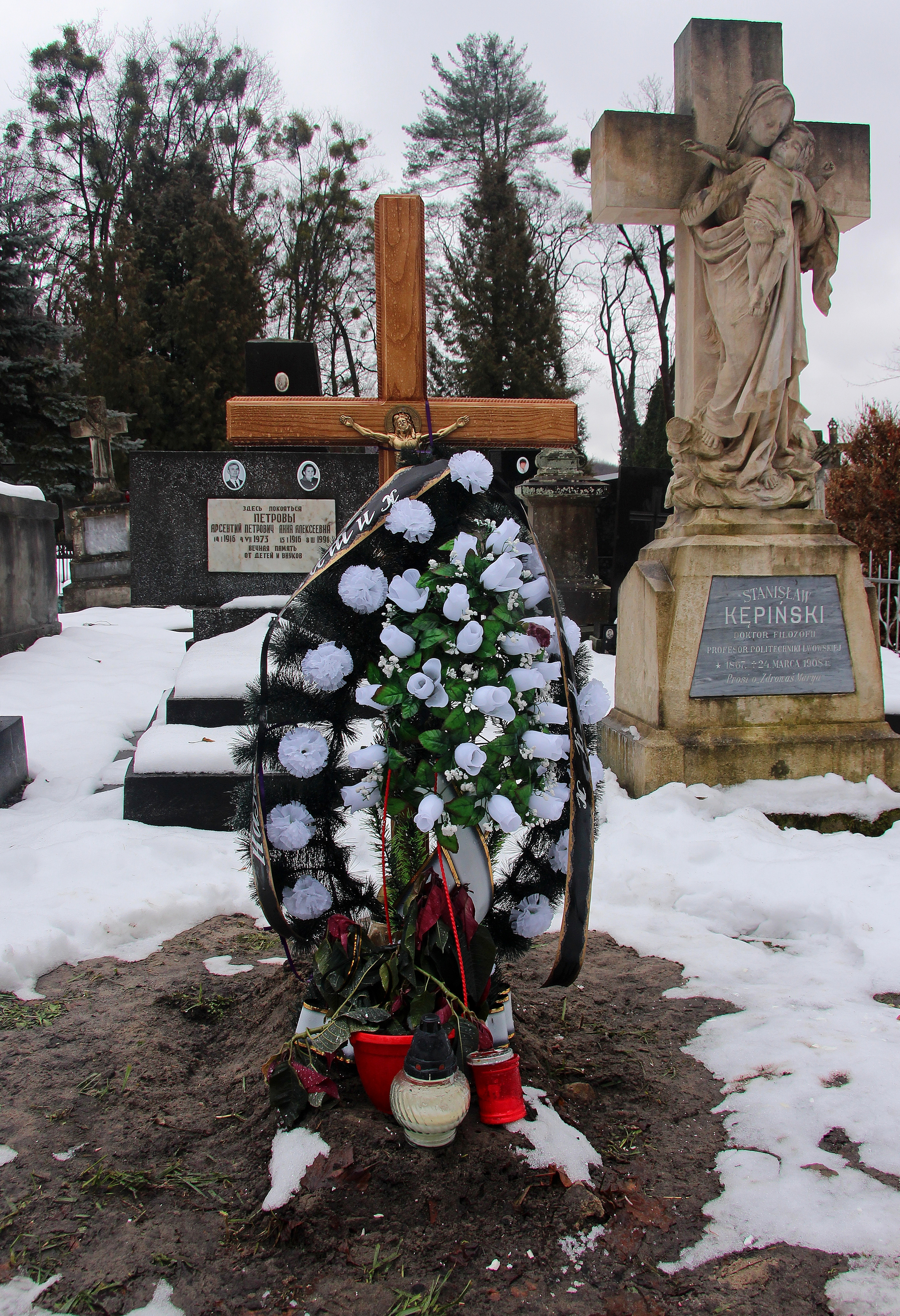
the grave of Anatoliy Saulevych at the Lychakiv Cemetery in Lviv

Born in Kyiv, Saulevych is a product of the local Sportinternat, where his first coach was Viktor Kyianchenko. In 1978 he made his debut in the Soviet First League with Karpaty Lviv. The following year, he achieved promotion to the Soviet Top League with the club, where in 1980 he played 26 matches, scoring one goal. At the end of the season, Karpaty were relegated to the First League again.

In 1982–1985 Saulevych played for another Lviv-based First League team, SKA Lviv. He later played for clubs playing in the Soviet Second League: Nyva Ternopil, Podillya Khmelnytskyi, Karpaty Lviv and Zaria Bălți. He finished his career in 1992 with Ukrainian First League club Halychyna Drohobych.

He graduated from Lviv State University of Physical Culture.

After his retirement he worked as an assistant coach at the Karpaty Lviv youth sportive school.

He died in Lviv on 13 November 2021.
