= Sergei Martynov (serial killer) =

Russian serial killer

Sergei Martynov Сергей Мартынов
- Born: Sergei Kashfulgayanovich Martynov; 2 June 1962 (age 64); Nyazepetrovsk, Chelyabinsk Oblast, Soviet Union
- Convictions: Murder x9 Rape
- Penalty: Life imprisonment

Details
- Victims: 9+
- Span of crimes: 1992–2010
- Country: Russia
- States: Abakan, Kemerovo, Glazov, Vladimir, Ufa, Oryol Oblast, Voronezh Oblast, Novgorod Oblast, Nizhny Novgorod Oblast
- Date apprehended: 18 November 2010

Sergei Kashfulgayanovich Martynov (Russian: Сергей Кашфулгаянович Мартынов; born 2 June 1962) is a Russian serial killer, convicted for the killing of eight people across western and central Russia between 2005 and 2010, and was earlier convicted of killing another woman in 1992.

== Background ==
Sergei Martynov was born on 2 June 1962, in Nyazepetrovsk, Chelyabinsk Oblast, Soviet Union.

== Murders ==
=== First murder and imprisonment (1992) ===
In 1992, Martynov was arrested on suspicion of raping and murdering an unidentified woman, which according to some sources was a teenage girl, for which he was convicted.

=== Crime spree (2005–2010) ===
In 2005, Martynov was released from prison after serving nearly 14 years for the 1992 murder. Shortly after his release, he attempted to rape a young girl at knifepoint in Kemerovo, but the victim survived and Martynov was placed on a wanted list by police.

In June 2007, Martynov murdered a woman and dismembered her body in Glazov, Udmurtia, and the following month he raped an 8-year-old girl in Vyazovka, a village in Nizhny Novgorod Oblast. In May 2008, Martynov killed a man during a robbery, and the following month killed an elderly woman in a forest, dismembering her body. In November he murdered a woman in Oryol Oblast. In August 2010, Martynov raped and killed a 70-year-old woman in Bashkortostan, where he left a note stating that he is not afraid of the police and would be in Chelyabinsk at 12:00.

In late 2010, Martynov killed his final victim, a woman in Voronezh Oblast.

== Arrest and conviction ==
Martynov was arrested on 18 November 2010, after the police tracked down his location when he activated a mobile phone that he had stolen from one of his victims. During the arrest Martynov did not try to resist, stating that he had wanted to be caught. According to prosecutors, Martynov is believed to have committed violent crimes across at least 10 oblasts in western and central Russia since his release from prison until his arrest, killing seven women and one man, and assaulting numerous others. Among the other victims were two minor girls, one of which was the victim of violent sexual abuse, and the other sustained serious injuries. Martynov often mutilated his female victims by removing their breasts and genitalia.

On 23 May 2012, prosecutors for the first time publicly disclosed details about the case. He has been charged with intentional infliction of a grave injury, hooliganism, murder of two or more persons, and violent sexual actions. Prosecutors said Martynov acted "daringly and cynically", leaving letters at crime scenes and making no effort to conceal evidence. He later claimed his killings were motivated by his wish for a "cleaning of the society". During his time in jail, when he was waiting for trial, Martynov asked to have another inmate in his cell so he could kill him "because he was bored". Martynov was convicted for eight murders and sentenced to life imprisonment.

== See also ==
- List of Russian serial killers
