= Andrey Martynov =

Andrey Martynov may refer to:

- Andrey Martynov (actor) (born 1945), Russian actor
- Andrey Vasilyevich Martynov (1879–1938), Russian entomologist and palaeontologist
- Andrey Yefimovich Martynov (1768–1826), Russian painter and engraver
- Andrei Martynov (footballer) (born 1965), retired Turkmenistani footballer
