= Kostyantyn Fomin =

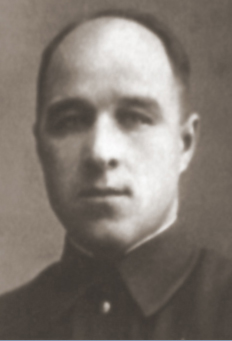

Personal information
- Full name: Kostyantyn Vasyliovych Fomin
- Date of birth: December 19, 1903
- Place of birth: Kharkiv, Kharkov Governorate, Russian Empire
- Date of death: January 16, 1964 (aged 60)
- Place of death: Moscow, Soviet Union
- Height: 1.67 m (5 ft 6 in)
- Position: Defender

Youth career
- 1913–1914: Shtandart Kharkiv

Senior career*
Years	Team	Apps	(Gls)
1922	OLS Kharkiv		
1923–1925	KFK Kharkiv		
1925–1928	Dynamo Kharkiv		
1929–1930	Dynamo Moscow	14	(1)
1930–1934	Dynamo Kharkiv		
1935–1936	Dynamo Kyiv	3	(0)
1937–1938	Lokomotyv Kyiv	22	(0)

International career
1932–1935	USSR	9	(0)
1924–1935	Ukrainian SSR		
1922–1928	Kharkiv city		
1929–1930	Moscow city		
1931–1934	Kharkiv city		
1935–1936	Kyiv city		
- * Club domestic league appearances and goals

Kostyantyn Vasyliovych Fomin (Ukrainian: Костянтин Васильович Фомін, Russian: Константи́н Васи́льевич Фоми́н; December 19, 1903 – January 16, 1964) was a Soviet-Ukrainian footballer, football functionary and war veteran. He was a brother of Volodymyr Fomin and Mykola Fomin.

Kostyantyn Fomin also was a member of OGPU/KGB. He was among the first players of Dynamo Kharkiv along with Mykola Kazakov back in 1925.

== Playing career ==
Kostyantyn started out by playing for the Kharkiv team "Shtandart" in early 1910s when he was 10. In 1920 he volunteered to the Soviet Red Army and participated in fighting the "gangs of Antonov" (by the Soviet propaganda verbiage).

In 1922 he joined a Kharkiv football team of the Society of Sports Amateurs (OLS). Next year Kostyantyn joined another Kharkiv team "Physical Culture Club" (KFK), for which he played next three seasons. In 1926 in Kharkiv was reorganized the local Dynamo football team which gathered under its banner the best city team players of "Shturm" (RabIs, in 1925) as well as most of Kharkiv city football team players who in 1924 won the Soviet football championship. Among those footballers appeared to be and Kostyantyn becoming the first of three Fomins who joined the Kharkiv Dynamo. In his interview Kostyantyn indicated that during 1928 season Dynamo Kharkiv did not have own head coach and that role was performed by the team's captain. He also indicated that the first game of tournament for his team was against Belarus national football team on 19 August 1928.

In 1929 he was invited to Moscow for the local Dynamo where he played for a season and half. In summer of 1930 Kostyantyn returned to Dynamo Kharkiv. In 1932 he was called to the Soviet national football team, for which he actively played until 1935. Soon after capital of Ukraine was moved from Kharkiv to Kyiv, Kostyantyn also moved to Dynamo Kyiv in 1935, with which in 1936 started to play in the newly formed Soviet professional championship in Group A (top tier, a progenitor of the Soviet Top League). In 1936 he was awarded the Merited Master of Sport of the USSR. In 1937 he moved to Lokomotyv Kyiv, with which in 1938 ended his playing career.

During the so-called "Great Patriotic War" (Eastern Front of World War II), Fomin fought at frontlines and earned a battle order of Red Star.

In 1959-64 Kostyantyn Fomin worked as an inspector and a senior methodical adviser at the Tsentralny Stadion imeni V.I.Lenina (Luzhniki Stadium).

=== Honours ===
- Soviet Union
  - Champion (1): 1924
  - Runner-up (2): 1928, spring 1936 (for Dynamo Kyiv)
- Ukrainian SSR
  - Champion (4): 1924, 1927, 1928, 1933
- Kharkiv
  - Champion: multiple times
- Moscow
  - Champion: 1930

== Career statistics ==
=== Club ===
Club	Season	League			Cup		Europe		Other		Total	
Club	Season	Division	Apps	Goals	Apps	Goals	Apps	Goals	Apps	Goals	Apps	Goals
Dynamo Moscow	1929	Dynamo sports society	?	?	–		–		–		?	?
Dynamo Moscow	1930	Moscow	?	?	–		–		–		?	?
Dynamo Moscow	Total		14	1	0	0	0	0	0	0	14	1
Dynamo Kyiv	1936 spring	Gruppa A	3	0	–		–		–		3	0
Dynamo Kyiv	Total		3	0	0	0	0	0	0	0	3	0
Lokomotyv Kyiv	1937	Gruppa V	7	0	–		–		–		7	0
Lokomotyv Kyiv	1938	Gruppa A	15	0	–		–		–		15	0
Lokomotyv Kyiv	Total		22	0	0	0	0	0	0	0	22	0
Career total (accounted games only)			39	1	0	0	0	0	0	0	39	1

=== International ===
National team	Year		
National team	Year	Apps	Goals
Soviet Union	1932	4	0
Soviet Union	1933	1	0
Soviet Union	1934	1	0
Soviet Union	1935	3	0
Career total		9	0

- Note: Due to sanctions against the Soviet Union, its early games are not recognized by the FIFA.
