= Yozhef Betsa =

Soviet footballer (1929–2011)

Medal record

Men's football

Representing Soviet Union

Olympic Games
Gold medal – first place	1956 Melbourne	Team

József Beca / Yozhef Betsa
Personal information
- Full name: Yozhef Yozhefovich Betsa
- Date of birth: 6 November 1929
- Place of birth: Mukačevo, Czechoslovakia
- Date of death: 24 February 2011 (aged 81)
- Place of death: Mukachevo, Ukraine
- Position: Midfielder

Youth career
- Mukachevo Tobacco Factory

Senior career*
Years	Team	Apps	(Gls)
1946	Bilshovyk Mukacheve		
1947–1949	Spartak Uzhhorod		
1950–1951	GDO Stanislav		
1951–1953	Spartak Stanislav		
1953–1954	ODO Lviv	22	(0)
1954–1958	CDSA / CSK MO Moscow	35	(2)

International career
1955–1956	USSR	2	(0)

Managerial career
- 1959–1961: Lenin Military Athletic Institute
- 1961: FC SKA Rostov-on-Don (assistant)
- 1963: FC SKA Rostov-on-Don (assistant)
- 1964–1967: FC SKA Rostov-on-Don
- 1968: FC SKA Rostov-on-Don (assistant)
- 1969–1970: SKA Lviv
- 1971–1972: FC SKA Rostov-on-Don
- 1972–1973: ZGV (East Germany)
- 1975: FC SKA Rostov-on-Don
- 1976–1978: FC Metalurh Zaporizhzhia
- 1979–1981: FC Ararat Yerevan
- 1982: FC Kairat
- 1985: SKA Odesa
- 1989: FC Torpedo Zaporizhia
- 1989–1990: SKA Rostov-on-Don
- 1991: Pryladyst Mukacheve (director)
- * Club domestic league appearances and goals

Yozhef Yozhefovich Betsa (Hungarian: József Beca, Ukrainian: Йожеф Йожефович Беца, Russian: Иосиф Иосифович Беца; 6 November 1929 – 24 February 2011) was a Ukrainian and Soviet football player and coach.

Betsa was an ethnic Magyar. Russian variation of his name had both variants, the Ukrainian transliteration of Hungarian as well as the standard Russian adaptation for Yozhef as Iosif. In December 2006, he was denied the invitation to accept a medal from the President of the Union of Russian football veterans, Alexander Bagratovich Mirzoyan, with the explanation that he had to reside in the Russian Federation. He was born and died in Mukacheve.

== Honours ==
- Soviet Cup winner: 1955.
- Olympic champion: 1956.

== International career ==
Yozhef Betsa capped only two games for the Soviet Union national football team. With one that he played at the 1956 Summer Olympics, where the Soviet Union played with its senior (first) team.

Betsa made his debut for USSR on 23 October 1955 in a friendly against France.

== See also ==
Other famous Soviet Magyar footballers:

- Fedir Medvid
- Vasyl Rats
- Yozhef Sabo
