= Oleksandr Shpakovsky =

Soviet footballer

Aleksandr Shpakovsky
Personal information
- Full name: Aleksandr Vikentyevich Shpakovsky
- Date of birth: 1899
- Place of birth: Kharkiv, Russian Empire
- Date of death: 9 June 1938 (aged 38–39)
- Place of death: Kharkiv, USSR
- Position: Striker

Youth career
- 1913–1915: Diana Kharkiv
- 1915–1916: Matrosse Kharkiv

Senior career*
Years	Team	Apps	(Gls)
1916–1919	Yanus Kharkiv		
1920–1922	OLS Kharkiv		
1923–1924	Shturm Kharkiv		
1925–1927	Rabis Kharkiv		
1928–1934	Dynamo Kharkiv		

International career
1924	USSR	1	(1)
1923–1931	Ukraine		

Managerial career
- 1935–1936: Dynamo Kharkiv
- * Club domestic league appearances and goals

Aleksandr Vikentyevich Shpakovsky (Russian: Александр Викентьевич Шпаковский) (1899–1938) was a Soviet football player.

== Biography ==
Shpakovsky was educated as an orthopedist and worked at the Kharkov Institute of Orthopedics.

He was interested in football, tennis, bandy, handball and athletics.

On 14 March 1938 Shpakovsky was arrested by the NKVD and accused of anti-Soviet activities. He was executed by firing squad on 9 June 1938. In 1958 he was rehabilitated and cleared of all charges.

== Career ==
Shpakovsky played his only game for USSR on 16 November 1924, a friendly against Turkey and scoring in that game.

In 1934 he finished his football career.

== Honours ==
- USSR football champion: 1924
- Ukrainian SSR tennis champion
- silver medals of the USSR Bandy (Russian hockey) Championship: 1928
