= Mykola Pavlov =

Ukrainian former footballer and manager

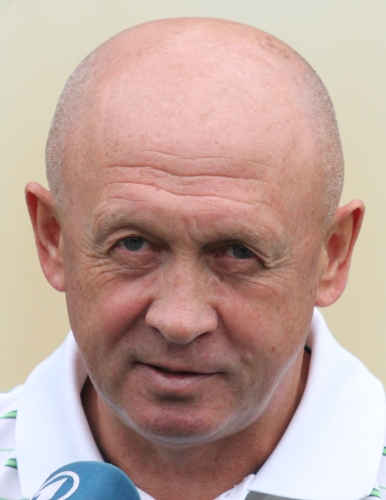

Personal information
- Full name: Mykola Petrovych Pavlov
- Date of birth: 20 June 1954 (age 72)
- Place of birth: Kyiv, Ukrainian SSR, Soviet Union
- Height: 1.71 m (5 ft 7 in)
- Position: Defender

Youth career
- 1967–1972: Vostok Kyiv

Senior career*
Years	Team	Apps	(Gls)
1972–1975	Bug Brest	80	(6)
1976–1978	Krylia Sovetov Kuybyshev	62	(1)
1979–1981	Dinamo Minsk	91	(1)
1982	Chornomorets Odesa	24	(0)
1983–1984	Dnipro Dnipropetrovsk	52	(4)
Total		309	(12)

International career
1984	USSR	1	(0)

Managerial career
- 1985: Dnipro Dnipropetrovsk (assistant)
- 1988: Kolos Nikopol
- 1989–1990: Tavriya Simferopol
- 1990: Krystal Kherson
- 1991: Dnipro Dnipropetrovsk (assistant)
- 1992–1994: Dnipro Dnipropetrovsk
- 1992: Ukraine (caretaker)
- 1994: Ukraine (caretaker)
- 1995: Dynamo Kyiv
- 1995–1996: Dynamo Kyiv (administrator)
- 1996–1997: Tavriya Simferopol
- 1997–2004: Illichivets Mariupol
- 2006: Stal Alchevsk
- 2007–2012: Vorskla Poltava
- 2012–2015: Illichivets Mariupol
- * Club domestic league appearances and goals

Mykola Petrovych Pavlov (Ukrainian: Микола Петрович Павлов) (born 20 June 1954) is a Ukrainian former football defender and manager. He is Merited Master of Sports of the USSR (1983) and Merited Coach of Ukraine.

== Education ==
- Dnipropetrovsk Institute of Physical Culture
- Higher School of Coaches (Moscow) (1986–87)

== Playing career ==
Pavlov began his playing career in 1972, playing for "Spartak Brest", (later renamed "Bug Brest", now FC Dinamo Brest) in the Belarusian SSR. The club played in the old Soviet Second League. After three years there he moved to Krylia Sovetov, a club in the Soviet Top League. Four seasons and three years later, in 1979 he moved back to Belarusian SSR to play for their best team in the Soviet Top League, Dinamo Minsk. Another 3 years later, in 1982 he was on the move again, this time back to Ukraine to play in Odesa for Chernomorets Odesa. The following season he moved to Dnipro Dnipropetrovsk. His two seasons there were the most successful of his career. He became the USSR champion in 1983, and won the bronze medal the following year (1984).

== International career ==
Pavlov was capped once for the USSR. He played in a 2–1 friendly loss against West Germany, on 28 March 1984 in Hanover.

== Coaching career ==
In 1988 Pavlov took up the head-coach position of Kolos Nikopol. During the 1990s he coached Tavriya Simferopol, Krystal Kherson, Dnipro Dnipropetrovsk. While coach of Dnipro he was brought on to be the caretaker head-coach of the Ukraine national football team. In the 1995–96 season Pavlov was coach of Dynamo Kyiv, leading them to a Ukrainian League title. Following Dynamo he has coached other Ukrainian clubs, including a return to Tavriya Simferopol, then at FC Illychivets Mariupol (7 years there), and FC Stal Alchevsk. In the winter of 2007 he was brought in as head-coach at FC Vorskla Poltava. In his first season with the team he led them to an 8th-place finish, and into the quarter-finals of Ukrainian Cup.

On 2 February 2017 Pavlov announced that he retired from coaching career.

=== Managerial statistics ===
As of 27 September 2013.

Team	From	To	Record							
Team	From	To	G	W	D	L	GF	GA	GD	Win %
Ukraine	28 October 1992	13 September 1994	3	0	1	2	1	4	−3	0.00

== Honours ==
=== Player ===
- Soviet Top League Champion: 1983
- Soviet Top League Bronze: 1984

=== Coach ===
- Ukrainian Premier League Champion: 1994–95
- Ukrainian Cup Champion: 2009

==== Orders and special awards ====
- Knight of the Order "For merits": 2009
