= Aleksandr Martynov (footballer) =

Russian footballer

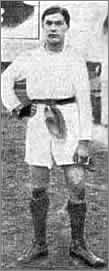

Personal information
- Full name: Aleksandr Nikolayevich Martynov
- Date of birth: 1892
- Date of death: 1956 (aged 63–64)
- Position: Goalkeeper

Senior career*
| Years | Team | Apps | (Gls) |
| 1910 | ZKS Moscow | | |
| 1911–1912 | KF Sokolniki Moscow | | |
| 1912–1913 | Novogireyevo Moscow | | |
| 1914 | SKL Moscow | | |
| 1914 | Union Moscow | | |
| 1916 | Novogireyevo Moscow | | |
| 1921 | FK 13 Sofia | | |
| 1923-1924 | Rus Prague | | |

International career
| 1914 | Russia | 2 | (-3) |
- * Club domestic league appearances and goals

Aleksandr Nikolayevich Martynov (Russian: Александр Николаевич Мартынов) (1892–1956) was an association football player.

== Club career ==
Martynov played for ZKS, Sokolniki, Novogireeyevo, SKL and Union in Moscow. He was a first-choice goalkeeper of the football club Galipoli, created by Russian emigrants from general Alexander Kutepov's army. With Galipoli Martynov played friendly matches with Bulgarian clubs and soon after that settled down in Bulgaria. He played for FK 13 with another Russian international player Grigoriy Bogemsky.

In 1923/24 Martynov played for Rus (Prague).

== International career ==
Martynov made his debut for Russia on July 5, 1914, in a friendly against Sweden.
