= Leonid Shmuts =

Ukrainian and Soviet footballer

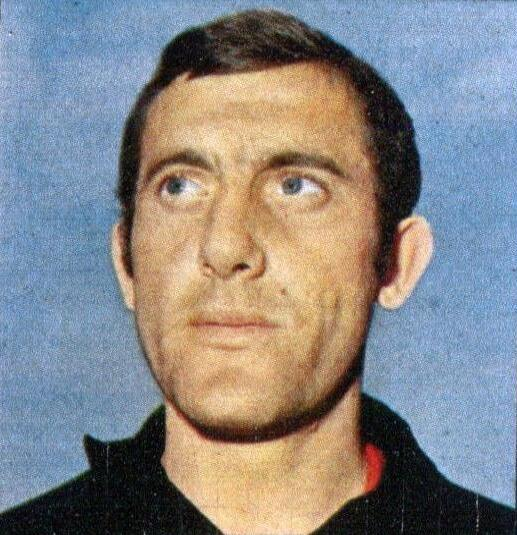
- Shmuts in 1970

Personal information
- Full name: Leonid Mykolayovych Shmuts
- Date of birth: 8 October 1948 (age 78)
- Place of birth: Nikopol, USSR
- Position: Goalkeeper

Youth career
- Trubnyk Nikopol

Senior career*
Years	Team	Apps	(Gls)
1965–1966	Trubnyk Nikopol	22	(0)
1967–1976	CSKA Moscow	54	(0)
1976–1979	SKA Kiev	125	(0)

International career
1971	USSR	2	(0)
- * Club domestic league appearances and goals

Leonid Mykolayovych Shmuts (Ukrainian: Леонід Миколайович Шмуц, Russian: Леонид Николаевич Шмуц; born October 8, 1948) is a retired Ukrainian and Soviet football player.

== Honours ==
- Soviet Top League winner: 1970.

== International career ==
Shmuts made his debut for USSR on February 19, 1971, in a friendly against Mexico national football team. He was selected for the 1970 FIFA World Cup squad, but did not play in any games at the tournament.

== Own goal ==
Shmuts is well known for the own goal that he scored in the Soviet league game against FC Ararat Yerevan on April 17, 1971. Shumts was going to throw the ball to his teammate and had already taken his hand with the ball back, but suddenly noticed that an Ararat player could intercept the ball and stopped the movement. The ball left his hand and crossed the goal line. That was the only goal in the game. This mistake was a heavy blow for the goalkeeper who never returned to his previous level of playing and never played again for the national team.
