= Ivan Privalov (footballer) =

Ukrainian footballer

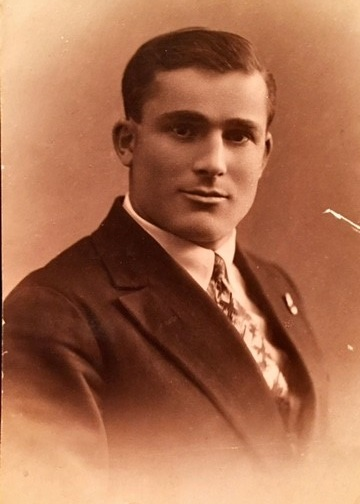

Personal information
- Full name: Ivan Vasilyevich Privalov
- Date of birth: 12 March 1902
- Place of birth: Kharkiv, Russian Empire
- Date of death: 26 January 1974 (aged 71)
- Place of death: Kharkiv, Ukrainian SSR, Soviet Union
- Position: Midfielder

Youth career
- Viktoriya Kharkiv

Senior career*
Years	Team	Apps	(Gls)
1920–1923	Shturm Kharkiv		
1924	Kharkiv FCC		
1925–1927	Rabis Kharkiv		
1928–1937	Dynamo Kharkiv		
1938–1939	Spartak Kharkiv		

International career
1924	USSR	1	(0)
- * Club domestic league appearances and goals

Ivan Vasilyevich Privalov (Russian: Ива́н Васи́льевич Прива́лов; 12 March 1902 – 26 January 1974) was a Ukrainian and Soviet football player.

== Honours ==
Kharkiv FCC

- USSR Champion: 1924

Individual

- Ukrainian Footballer of the Year: 1922, 1923, 1925, 1926, 1927

== International career ==
Privalov made his debut for USSR on 16 November 1924 in a friendly against Turkey along with Oleksandr Shpakovsky from FC Sturm Kharkiv (the Soviet Union won 3:0). He also participated in six other unofficial games against Turkey Amateurs from 1925 to 1933.
