= Grigori Bogemsky =

Russian footballer

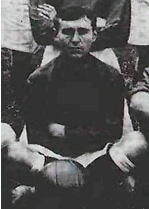

Personal information
- Full name: Grigori Grigoryevich Bogemsky
- Date of birth: 1895
- Place of birth: Odessa, Russia
- Date of death: 1957 (aged 61–62)
- Place of death: Prague, Czechoslovakia
- Position: Striker

Senior career*
Years	Team	Apps	(Gls)
1911	Vega Odessa		
1912–1914	Sporting Club Odessa		
1917–1919	ROS Odessa		
1921	FC 13		
1923	Rus Prague		
1924–1927	FK Viktoria Žižkov		

International career
1913	Russia	1	(0)
- * Club domestic league appearances and goals

Grigori Grigoryevich Bogemsky (Russian: Григорий Григорьевич Богемский) (born 1895 in Odessa; died 1957 in Prague) was a Russian football player.

== Honors ==
- Russian League winner: 1913

== International career ==
Bogemsky played his only game for Russia on 14 September 1913 in a friendly against Norway.
