= Mykola Fomin =

Soviet footballer

Personal information
- Full name: Mykola Vasylyovych Fomin
- Date of birth: 1909
- Place of birth: Kharkov, Russian Empire
- Date of death: 1975 (aged 66)
- Place of death: Kharkiv, Ukrainian SSR, Soviet Union
- Position: Midfielder

Youth career
- 1916–1920: Shtandart Kharkiv

Senior career*
Years	Team	Apps	(Gls)
1920–1921	Diana Kharkiv		
1922–1922	OLS Kharkiv		
1923–1927	KFK Kharkiv		
1928–1937	Dynamo Kharkiv		
1938–1938	Spartak Kharkiv		

International career
	USSR	1	
1926–1933	Ukraine		

Managerial career
- FC Dynamo Kharkiv
- * Club domestic league appearances and goals

Mykola Vasylyovych Fomin (born in 1905 in Kharkiv; died in 1975 in Kharkiv) was a Soviet football player. He was a brother to Volodymyr and Kostiantyn Fomins.

== Honours ==
- USSR champion: 1924.

== International career ==
Fomin played his only game for USSR on July 30, 1933 in a friendly against Turkey.
