= Volodymyr Fomin =

Ukrainian footballer (1902–1942)

Personal information
- Full name: Volodymyr Vasilyevich Fomin
- Date of birth: 1902
- Place of birth: Kharkiv, Kharkov Governorate, Russian Empire
- Date of death: 1942 (aged 39–40)
- Place of death: Kharkiv, Ukrainian SSR, Soviet Union
- Height: 1.68 m (5 ft 6 in)
- Position: Midfielder

Youth career
- Shtandart Kharkiv

Senior career*
Years	Team	Apps	(Gls)
1922	OLS Kharkiv		
1923–1925	KFK Kharkiv		
1926–1927	ORK Kharkiv		
1928–1936	Dynamo Kharkiv		

Managerial career
- 1937: Dynamo Kharkiv
- 1938: Dynamo Kyiv
- 1939–1941: Dynamo Kharkiv
- * Club domestic league appearances and goals

Volodymyr Vasilyevich Fomin (Russian: Владимир Васильевич Фомин; 1902, Kharkov – 1942, Kharkov) was a Ukrainian footballer and coach. He was the oldest brother of Kostiantyn Fomin and Mykola Fomin.

Volodymyr played for Dynamo Kharkiv between 1928 and 1936 during which he was Bronze medalist at the USSR Championships in 1935. He coached the club in 1937 and 1938 - 1941 and a brief spell in 1938 managing Dynamo Kiev. He played for the Soviet Union several times in unofficial matches in the mid-1920s. In 1942 he was executed by the German occupiers (or "fascists") for hiding a Jew.
