= 2000–01 FC Shakhtar Donetsk season =

Shakhtar Donetsk
2000–01 season
- Chairman: Rinat Akhmetov
- Manager: Viktor Prokopenko
- Ground: Shakhtar Stadium
- Vyshcha Liha: 2nd
- Ukrainian Cup: Champions
- Champions League: Group stage
- UEFA Cup: Third Roumd
- Top goalscorer: League: Andriy Vorobey (21); All: Andriy Vorobey (34)
- Highest home attendance: 33,000 vs CSKA Kyiv (11 June 2001)
- Lowest home attendance: 10,000 vs Nyva Ternopil (22 July 2000)
- Average home league attendance: 24,462 (11 June 2001)
Home colours	Away colours

The 2000–01 season was FC Shakhtar Donetsk's 10th consecutive season in the top flight of Ukrainian football.

== Squad ==
As of match played 19 June 2001

Number	Name	Nationality	Position	Date of birth (Age)	Signed from	Signed in	Contract ends	Apps.	Goals
Goalkeepers
1	Yuriy Virt	(Ukraine)	GK	4 May 1974 (aged 27)	Metalurh Donetsk	1999			
12	Dmytro Shutkov	(Ukraine)	GK	3 April 1972 (aged 29)	Youth team	1991		261	0
16	Aleksei Botvinyev	(Russia)	GK	25 June 1981 (aged 19)	Kolomna	2000			
Defenders
2	Mykhaylo Starostyak	(Ukraine)	DF	13 October 1973 (aged 27)	Spartak Ivano-Frankivsk	1995			
3	Dainius Gleveckas	(Lithuania)	DF	5 March 1977 (aged 24)	Ekranas	1999			
5	Serhiy Popov	(Ukraine)	DF	22 April 1971 (aged 30)	Zenit St.Petersburg	1997			
13	Assane N'Diaye	(Senegal)	DF	1 August 1974 (aged 26)	ASC Jeanne d'Arc	2001			
14	Vyacheslav Shevchuk	(Ukraine)	DF	13 May 1979 (aged 22)	Metalurh Zaporizhzhia	2000			
15	Valeriy Kryventsov	(Ukraine)	DF	30 July 1973 (aged 27)	Youth Team	1991			
22	Isaac Okoronkwo	(Nigeria)	DF	1 May 1978 (aged 23)	Sheriff Tiraspol	2000			
25	Andriy Konyushenko	(Ukraine)	DF	2 April 1977 (aged 24)	Metalurh Zaporizhzhia	2001			
	Oleh Shkred	(Ukraine)	DF	1 October 1982 (aged 18)	Lviv	2000			
Midfielders
4	Anatoliy Tymoshchuk	(Ukraine)	MF	30 March 1979 (aged 22)	Volyn Lutsk	1998		101	10
6	Aleksei Bakharev	(Russia)	MF	12 October 1976 (aged 24)	Rotor Volgograd	1999			
8	Serhiy Kovalyov	(Ukraine)	MF	21 November 1971 (aged 29)	Makiyivvuhillya Makiyivka	1994			
9	Hennadiy Zubov	(Ukraine)	MF	12 September 1977 (aged 23)	Stal Alchevsk	1994		228	56
17	Marian Aliuță	(Romania)	MF	4 February 1978 (aged 23)	Sheriff Tiraspol	2000			
19	Oleksiy Hai	(Ukraine)	MF	6 November 1982 (aged 18)	Metalurh-2 Zaporizhzhia	2000			
21	Vitaliy Abramov	(Kazakhstan)	MF	12 July 1974 (aged 26)	Rotor Volgograd	2000			
26	Oleh Pestryakov	(Ukraine)	MF	5 August 1974 (aged 26)	Rostselmash	1999			
27	Yaroslav Khoma	(Ukraine)	MF	17 February 1974 (aged 27)	Karpaty Lviv	2001			
30	Hennadiy Orbu	(Ukraine)	MF	23 July 1970 (aged 30)	Rotor Volgograd	1997		238	49
	Yevhen Bredun	(Ukraine)	MF	10 September 1982 (aged 18)	Youth team	2000			
Forwards
7	Julius Aghahowa	(Nigeria)	FW	12 February 1982 (aged 19)	Espérance	2000		10	8
10	Serhiy Atelkin	(Ukraine)	FW	8 January 1972 (aged 29)	Lecce	2000		244	79
11	Andriy Vorobey	(Ukraine)	FW	29 November 1978 (aged 22)	Youth team	1995		106	62
18	Marian Savu	(Romania)	FW	11 October 1972 (aged 28)	Național București	2000			
19	Igor Strelkov	(Russia)	FW	21 March 1982 (aged 19)	Lada Togliatti	2001			
20	Oleksiy Byelik	(Ukraine)	FW	15 February 1981 (aged 20)	Youth team	1998		35	10
Players who left during the season
13	Aleksandr Shmarko	(Russia)	MF	12 March 1969 (aged 32)	Rotor Volgograd	2000			

== Transfers ==
=== In ===
Date From	Position	Nationality	Name	From	Fee	Ref.
1 July 2000	DF	(Nigeria)	Isaac Okoronkwo	Sheriff Tiraspol	Undisclosed	
1 July 2000	DF	(Ukraine)	Vyacheslav Shevchuk	Metalurh Zaporizhzhia	Undisclosed	
1 July 2000	MF	(Ukraine)	Oleksiy Hai	Metalurh-2 Zaporizhzhia	Undisclosed	
1 July 2000	FW	(Romania)	Marian Savu	Național București	Undisclosed	
1 January 2001	DF	(Senegal)	Assane N'Diaye	ASC Jeanne d'Arc	Undisclosed	
1 January 2001	MF	(Ukraine)	Yaroslav Khoma	Karpaty Lviv	Undisclosed	
1 January 2001	FW	(Nigeria)	Julius Aghahowa	Espérance	Undisclosed	
1 January 2001	FW	(Russia)	Igor Strelkov	Lada Togliatti	Undisclosed	
1 February 2001	DF	(Ukraine)	Andriy Konyushenko	Metalurh Zaporizhzhia	Undisclosed	

=== Out ===
Date From	Position	Nationality	Name	To	Fee	Ref.
1 January 2001	MF	(Russia)	Aleksandr Shmarko	Rostselmash	Undisclosed	

== Competitions ==
=== Overall ===
Competition	First match	Last match	Starting round	Final position	Record							
Competition	First match	Last match	Starting round	Final position	Pld	W	D	L	GF	GA	GD	Win %
Vyshcha Liha	12 July 2000	19 June 2001	Matchday 1	Runnersup	26	19	6	1	71	21	+50	73.08
Ukrainian Cup	16 September 2000	27 May 2001	First round	Winner	5	5	0	0	14	4	+10	100.00
UEFA Champions League	26 July 2000	7 November 2000	Second qualifying round	Group Stage	10	5	0	5	21	18	+3	50.00
UEFA Cup	23 November 2000	7 December 2000	Third round	Third round	2	0	1	1	0	1	−1	0.00
Total					43	29	7	7	106	44	+62	67.44

Last updated: 19 June 2001
Source: Results

=== Vyshcha Liha ===
==== League table ====
Pos	Team	Pld	W	D	L	GF	GA	GD	Pts	Qualification or relegation
1	Dynamo Kyiv (C)	26	20	4	2	58	17	+41	64	Qualification to Champions League third qualifying round
2	Shakhtar Donetsk (Note: Participant of the 2001 Ukrainian Cup Final)	26	19	6	1	71	21	+50	63	Qualification to Champions League second qualifying round
3	Dnipro Dnipropetrovsk	26	17	4	5	37	18	+19	55	Qualification to UEFA Cup first round
4	Metalurh Mariupol	26	13	4	9	35	26	+9	43	
5	Metalurh Donetsk	26	11	9	6	30	24	+6	42	
6	CSKA Kyiv	26	10	10	6	30	23	+7	40	Qualification to UEFA Cup qualifying round
7	Tavriya Simferopol	26	8	9	9	24	31	−7	33	Qualification to Intertoto Cup second round
8	Metalurh Zaporizhzhia	26	8	8	10	27	31	−4	32	
9	Metalist Kharkiv	26	8	7	11	27	37	−10	31	
10	Karpaty Lviv	26	9	3	14	33	42	−9	30	
11	Kryvbas Kryvyi Rih	26	6	6	14	22	36	−14	24	
12	Vorskla Poltava	26	6	5	15	16	29	−13	23	
13	Stal Alchevsk (R)	26	3	6	17	19	49	−30	15	Relegated to Ukrainian First League
14	Nyva Ternopil (R)	26	2	3	21	20	65	−45	9	Relegated to Ukrainian First League

Source: uafootball.net.ua
(C) Champions; (R) Relegated

==== Results summary ====
Overall								Home						Away					
Pld	W	D	L	GF	GA	GD	Pts	W	D	L	GF	GA	GD	W	D	L	GF	GA	GD
26	19	6	1	71	21	+50	63	10	3	0	35	9	+26	9	3	1	36	12	+24

Last updated: 17 June 2007.
Source: Results

==== Results by round ====
Round	1	2	3	4	5	6	7	8	9	10	11	12	13	14	15	16	17	18	19	20	21	22	23	24	25	26
Ground	H	A	H	A	H	H	A	H	H	A	A	A	A	H	A	H	A	H	A	H	A	H	H	H	A	A
Result	W	L	W	W	W	W	W	D	W	D	W	D	W	W	W	D	W	W	W	W	D	W	W	D	W	W
Position																										

Updated to match(es) played on 17 June 2001. Source: Results
A = Away; H = Home; W = Win; D = Draw; L = Loss

==== Results ====
12 July 2000 1	Shakhtar Donetsk	3–0	Metalurh Donetsk	Donetsk
19:00 EEST (UTC+3)	Vorobey 12', 71'; Tymoshchuk 58'	Report		Stadium: Shakhtar Stadium; Attendance: 12,000; Referee: Vyacheslav Zhukov

16 July 2000 2	CSKA Kyiv	1–0	Shakhtar Donetsk	Kyiv
18:00 EEST (UTC+3)	Zakarlyuka 28' (pen.); Annenkov (yellow card) 71'; Volosyanko (yellow card) 75'	Report	Zubov (yellow card) 63'; Starostyak (yellow card) 90'	Stadium: CSK ZSU Stadion; Attendance: 5,000; Referee: Vitaliy Hodulian

22 July 2000 3	Shakhtar Donetsk	2–1	Nyva Ternopil	Donetsk
19:00 EEST (UTC+3)	Zubov (penalty missed) 23'; Vorobey 63', 65'; Popov (yellow card) 43'; Tymoshchuk (yellow card) 50'	Report	Filipenko (yellow card) 5'; Mazur (yellow card) 26'; Khomenko 43' (yellow card) 78'; Kryvyi (yellow card) 51'; Lemishko (yellow card) 58'; Dgebuadze (yellow card) 79'; Shymanskyi (yellow card) 84'	Stadium: Shakhtar Stadium; Attendance: 10,000; Referee: Vadim Shelmenko

30 July 2000 4	Stal Alchevsk	2–5	Shakhtar Donetsk	Alchevsk
18:00 EEST (UTC+3)	Arefyev 50'; Tsvik 85'	Report	Savu 20', 54' (pen.), 57'; Tymoshchuk 65'; Vorobey 75'	Stadium: Stal Stadium; Attendance: 9,000; Referee: Gennadiy Kovalenko

17 August 2000 5	Shakhtar Donetsk	8–0	Metalist Kharkiv	Donetsk
19:00 EEST (UTC+3)	Zubov 32', 87'; Popov 44'; Vorobey 49' (pen.); Atelkin 62'; Byelik 72', 83'; Bakharev 77'	Report	Pets (yellow card) 81'	Stadium: Shakhtar Stadium; Attendance: 20,000; Referee: Valeriy Onufer

27 August 2000 6	Shakhtar Donetsk	3–1	Metalurh Mariupol	Donetsk
19:00 EEST (UTC+3)	Vorobey 66' (pen.), 85'; Zubov 75'	Report	Goncharenko (yellow card) 27'; Rykun 68' (pen.)	Stadium: Shakhtar Stadium; Attendance: 27,000; Referee: Vadym Shevchenko

7 September 2000 7	Dnipro Dnipropetrovsk	1–4	Shakhtar Donetsk	Dnipro
19:30 EEST (UTC+3)	Zadorozhnyi (yellow card) 25'; Zubkov (yellow card) 29'; Shelayev (yellow card) 35'; Poltavets (yellow card) 75'; Holovko 89'	Report	Vorobey 6'; Zubov (yellow card) 22' (goal) 70', 85'; Tymoshchuk (yellow card) 24' (goal) 73'; Shevchuk (yellow card) 27'	Stadium: Meteor Stadium; Attendance: 18,000; Referee: Serhiy Shebek

1 October 2000 8	Shakhtar Donetsk	1–1	Dynamo Kyiv	Donetsk
18:00 EEST (UTC+3)	Vorobey 47'; Gleveckas (yellow card) 89'	Report	Bodnár 41'; Kaladze (yellow card) 63'	Stadium: Shakhtar Stadium; Attendance: 31,000; Referee: Valeriy Onufer

21 October 2000 9	Shakhtar Donetsk	3–2	Karpaty Lviv	Donetsk
17:00 EEST (UTC+3)	Vorobey 23'; Zubov 55' (pen.); Popov 73'; Okoronkwo (yellow card) 80'	Report	Pokladok (yellow card) 14'; Luchkevych 43'; Makovey 56' (yellow card) 61'; Sharan (yellow card) 58'; Nazarov (yellow card) 88'	Stadium: Shakhtar Stadium; Attendance: 20,000; Referee: Ihor Yarmenchuk

29 October 2000 10	Vorskla Poltava	2–2	Shakhtar Donetsk	Poltava
15:00 EET (UTC+2)	Huzenko (yellow card) 17'; Pershyn (yellow card) 43'; Onopko 49'; Melashchenko 70'	Report	Atelkin 8', 44' (yellow card) 35'; Tymoshchuk (yellow card) 44'; Zubov (yellow card) 58'	Stadium: Oleksiy Butovsky Vorskla Stadium; Attendance: 9,000; Referee: Anatoly Zhosan

11 November 2000 11	Metalurh Zaporizhzhia	2–3	Shakhtar Donetsk	Zaporizhzhia
14:00 EET (UTC+2)	Skysh (yellow card) 8'; Baston 58'; Demchenko 89'	Report	Vorobey 8' (pen.); Bakharev (yellow card) 48'; Kovalyov 57'; Popov (yellow card) 68' (goal) 78'	Stadium: Central Stadium; Attendance: 8,000; Referee: Sergey Dzyuba

15 November 2000 12	Tavriya Simferopol	0–0	Shakhtar Donetsk	Simferopol
18:00 EET (UTC+2)		Report	Starostyak (yellow card) 87'; Aliuță (yellow card) 88'	Stadium: Lokomotiv Republican Sports Complex; Attendance: 14,000; Referee: Igor Horozhankin

28 November 2000 13	Kryvbas Kryvyi Rih	0–4	Shakhtar Donetsk	Kryvyi Rih
18:00 EET (UTC+2)	Mizin (yellow card) 71'; Hranovskyi (yellow card) 80'	Report	Vorobey 11'; Gleveckas (yellow card) 18'; Tymoshchuk 45'; Popov (yellow card) 58' (goal) 90'; Bakharev 65'	Stadium: Metalurh Stadium; Attendance: 3,000; Referee: Igor Ishchenko

11 March 2001 14	Shakhtar Donetsk	1–0	Vorskla Poltava	Donetsk
18:00 EET (UTC+2)	Popov 44'	Report	Huzenko (yellow card) 19'; Gorodchanin (yellow card) 25'; Dotsenko (yellow card) 28'	Stadium: Shakhtar Stadium; Attendance: 30,000; Referee: Ihor Yarmenchuk

17 March 2000 15	Karpaty Lviv	0–2	Shakhtar Donetsk	Lviv
16:00 EET (UTC+2)	Vilchinsky (yellow card) 80'; Sharan (yellow card) 89'; Lutsishin (yellow card) 90'	Report	Konyushenko (yellow card) 27'; Aghahowa 55'; Gleveckas (yellow card) 68'; Aliuță 87'; Atelkin (yellow card) 90'	Stadium: Ukraina Stadium; Attendance: 21,000; Referee: Igor Horozhankin

2 April 2001 16	Shakhtar Donetsk	1–1	Metalurh Zaporizhzhia	Donetsk
18:00 EEST (UTC+3)	Aghahowa 26'; N'Diaye (yellow card) 35'	Report	Demchenko 23'	Stadium: Shakhtar Stadium; Attendance: 30,000; Referee: Valeriy Onufer

7 April 2001 17	Dynamo Kyiv	1–2	Shakhtar Donetsk	Kyiv
19:00 EEST (UTC+3)	Melaschenko 17'; Nesmachnyi (yellow card) 30'	Report	Popov (yellow card) 27'; N'Diaye (yellow card) 39' (goal) 53'; Aghahowa 50'; Vorobey (yellow card) 75'	Stadium: Olympic Stadium; Attendance: 73,950; Referee: Anatoly Zhosan

15 April 2001 18	Shakhtar Donetsk	3–1	Dnipro Dnipropetrovsk	Donetsk
17:00 EEST (UTC+3)	Vorobey (yellow card) 55' (goal) 90'; Zubov 58', 82'; Starostyak (yellow card) 69'	Report	Maksymyuk 14'; Yezerskiy (yellow card) 55'; Mazyar (yellow card) 75'	Stadium: Shakhtar Stadium; Attendance: 28,000; Referee: Ihor Ishchenko

21 April 2001 19	Metalurh Mariupol	1–3	Shakhtar Donetsk	Mariupol
16:00 EEST (UTC+3)	Mekhanoshin (yellow card) 38' (yellow-red card) 39'; Molokutsko 65' (pen.); Rykun (penalty missed) 90'	Report	Vorobey 10'; Atelkin 41', 66' (yellow card) 90'	Stadium: Azovstal Stadium; Attendance: 12,000; Referee: Vitaliy Hodulian

29 April 2001 20	Shakhtar Donetsk	2–1	Kryvbas Kryvyi Rih	Donetsk
17:00 EEST (UTC+3)	Strelkov 45'; Vorobey 56' (pen.)	Report	Gorin (yellow card) 7'; Kyryukhin (yellow card) 56'; Checher 65'	Stadium: Shakhtar Stadium; Attendance: 27,000; Referee: Sergey Dzyuba

5 May 2001 21	Metalist Kharkiv	1–1	Shakhtar Donetsk	Kharkiv
17:00 EEST (UTC+3)	Palyanytsya (yellow card) 44'; Rudnyak 54' (yellow card) 77'	Report	Atelkin 43'; Aliuță (yellow card) 44'; Vorobey (penalty missed) 77'; Popov (yellow card) 78'	Stadium: Metalist Sports Complex; Attendance: 25,000; Referee: Igor Horozhankin

12 May 2001 22	Shakhtar Donetsk	5–0	Tavriya Simferopol	Donetsk
18:00 EEST (UTC+3)	Popov 25'; Vorobey 46', 68' (yellow card) 79'; Atelkin (yellow card) 48' (goal) 88', 89'	Report	Levchenko (yellow card) 22'	Stadium: Shakhtar Stadium; Attendance: 25,000; Referee: Vitaliy Hodulian

20 May 2001 23	Shakhtar Donetsk	3–1	Stal Alchevsk	Donetsk
18:00 EEST (UTC+3)	Atelkin 8'; Starostyak 56'; Aghahowa 76'	Report	Arefyev 43'	Stadium: Shakhtar Stadium; Attendance: 25,000; Referee: Ihor Yarmenchuk

11 June 2001 24	Shakhtar Donetsk	0–0	CSKA Kyiv	Donetsk
19:00 EEST (UTC+3)	N'Diaye (yellow card) 25'; Bakharev (yellow card) 79'	Report	Revut (yellow card) 25'; Kirlik (yellow card) 60'	Stadium: Shakhtar Stadium; Attendance: 33,000; Referee: Valeriy Onufer

15 June 2001 25	Nyva Ternopil	0–7	Shakhtar Donetsk	Ternopil
18:00 EEST (UTC+3)		Report	Zubov 13'; Aghahowa 16', 35', 42'; Popov 33'; Atelkin 46'; Vorobey 84'	Stadium: City Stadium; Attendance: 6,000; Referee: Serhiy Shebek

19 June 2001 26	Metalurh Donetsk	1–3	Shakhtar Donetsk	Donetsk
19:00 EEST (UTC+3)	Shyshchenko (yellow card) 15'; Mintenko 40'	Report	Vorobey 3', 20'; Atelkin 13'	Stadium: Metalurh Stadium; Attendance: 3,000; Referee: Vyacheslav Zhukov

=== Ukrainian Cup ===
16 September 2000 First round	Polihraftekhnika Oleksandriya	0–3	Shakhtar Donetsk	Oleksandriia
EEST (UTC+3)		Report	Tymoshchuk 7'; Vorobey 27'; Byelik 78'	Stadium: CSC Nika Stadium; Attendance: 4,200

23 September 2000 Second round	Zakarpattia Uzhhorod	1–2	Shakhtar Donetsk	Uzhhorod
EEST (UTC+3)	Prodan 30'	Report	Popov 65'; Byelik 80'	Stadium: Avanhard Stadium; Attendance: 6,000; Referee: Dziuba

2 November 2000 Quarterfinal	Kryvbas Kryvyi Rih	1–5 (a.e.t.)	Shakhtar Donetsk	Kryvyi Rih
18:00 EET (UTC+2)	Mizin 24'; Checher (yellow card) 43'; Hranovskyi (yellow card) 47' (yellow-red card) 114'; Kriulin (yellow card) 87'	Report	Gleveckas (yellow card) 40'; Starostyak (yellow card) 70'; Vorobey 72', 97', 103', 118' (yellow card) 98'; Atelkin (yellow card) 85'; Tymoshchuk (yellow card) 96'; Aliuță 113'; Zubov (yellow card) 114'	Stadium: Metalurh Stadium; Attendance: 12,000; Referee: Serhiy Shebek

11 April 2001 Semifinal	Metalurh Mariupol	1–2	Shakhtar Donetsk	Mariupol
16:00 EEST (UTC+3)	Molokutsko 69'; Molokutsko (yellow card) 80'; Babich (yellow card) 82'	Report	Aghahowa 19'; Vorobey 57'	Stadium: Azovstal Stadium; Attendance: 12,000; Referee: Ihor Yarmenchuk

27 May 2001 Final	CSKA Kyiv	1–2 (a.e.t.)	Shakhtar Donetsk	Kyiv
17:00 EEST (UTC+3)	Kostyshyn 7'; Volosyanko (yellow card) 109'; Maltsev (yellow card) 116'	Report	Atelkin 78', 119' (yellow card) 78'; Zubov (yellow card) 82'; Aghahowa (yellow card) 110'	Stadium: NSC Olimpiyskiy; Attendance: 55,000; Referee: Vasyl Melnychuk

=== UEFA Champions League ===
==== Qualifying rounds ====
26 July 2000 Second qualifying round 1st leg	Shakhtar Donetsk (Ukraine)	4–1	(Estonia) Levadia Maardu	Donetsk, Ukraine
18:00 EEST (UTC+3)	Atellkin 4', 16', 57'; Popov (yellow card) 65'; Byelik 71'; Abramov (yellow card) 81'	Report	Prins (yellow card) 43'; Rõtškov 80'	Stadium: Shakhtar Stadium; Attendance: 30,000; Referee: Milan Mitrović (Slovenia)

2 August 2000 Second qualifying round 2nd leg	Levadia Maardu (Estonia)	1–5 (2–9 agg.)	(Ukraine) Shakhtar Donetsk	Tallinn, Estonia
18:00 EEST (UTC+3)	Bragin 48'; Prins (yellow card) 79'	Report	Vorobey 26', 31', 79'; Shmarko (yellow card) 57'; Zubov (yellow card) 85' (goal) 90+3'; Atelkin 90+1'	Stadium: Kadriorg Stadium; Attendance: 1,500; Referee: Martin Ingvarsson (Sweden)

9 August 2000 Third qualifying round 1st leg	Shakhtar Donetsk (Ukraine)	0–1	(Czech Republic) Slavia Prague	Donetsk, Ukraine
19:00 EEST (UTC+3)	Vorobey (yellow card) 4'	Report	Zelenka (yellow card) 48'; Ulich 89'	Stadium: Shakhtar Stadium; Attendance: 31,547; Referee: Pascal Garibian (France)

22 August 2000 Third qualifying round 2nd leg	Slavia Prague (Czech Republic)	0–2 (a.e.t.) (1–2 agg.)	(Ukraine) Shakhtar Donetsk	Prague, Czech Republic
19:00 EEST (UTC+3)		Report	Zubov (yellow card) 35'; Starostyak (yellow card) 37'; Vorobey 90'; Atelkin 97'; Shevchuk (yellow card) 111'	Stadium: Stadion Evžena Rošického; Attendance: 8,578; Referee: Leslie Irvine (Northern Ireland)

==== Group stage ====
Pos	Team	Pld	W	D	L	GF	GA	GD	Pts	Qualification
1	(England) Arsenal	6	4	1	1	11	8	+3	13	Advance to second group stage
2	(Italy) Lazio	6	4	1	1	13	4	+9	13	Advance to second group stage
3	(Ukraine) Shakhtar Donetsk	6	2	0	4	10	15	−5	6	Transfer to UEFA Cup
4	(Czech Republic) Sparta Prague	6	1	0	5	6	13	−7	3	

Source: UEFA

12 September 2000 1	Shakhtar Donetsk (Ukraine)	0–3	(Italy) Lazio	Donetsk, Ukraine
21:45 EEST (UTC+3)	Atelkin (yellow card) 56'	Report	López 27' (yellow card) 73'; Nedvěd (yellow card) 42' (goal) 68'; Inzaghi 78'	Stadium: Shakhtar Stadium; Attendance: 31,511; Referee: Michel Piraux (Belgium)

20 September 2000 2	Arsenal (England)	3–2	(Ukraine) Shakhtar Donetsk	London, England
21:45 EEST (UTC+3)	Keown (yellow card) 45' (goal) 85', 90+2'; Wiltord 45+4'	Report	Popov (yellow card) 10' (yellow-red card) 45'; Bakharev 26'; Vorobey 29'; Starostyak (yellow card) 39'; Virt (yellow card) 42'; Tymoshchuk (yellow card) 45'	Stadium: Highbury; Attendance: 33,922; Referee: Hartmut Strampe (Germany)

27 September 2000 3	Sparta Prague (Czech Republic)	3–2	(Ukraine) Shakhtar Donetsk	Prague, Czech Republic
21:45 EEST (UTC+3)	Rosický 54'; Horňák 73'; Jarošík 82'	Report	Aliuță (yellow card) 26'; Zubov 56'; Gleveckas (yellow card) 65'; Horňák 84' (o.g.)	Stadium: Stadion Letná; Attendance: 7,391; Referee: Konrad Plautz (Austria)

17 October 2000 4	Shakhtar Donetsk (Ukraine)	2–1	(Czech Republic) Sparta Prague	Donetsk, Ukraine
21:45 EEST (UTC+3)	Gleveckas 35' (yellow card) 45'; Zubov 87' (pen.)	Report	Jarošík 16'; Labant (yellow card) 18'; Sionko (yellow card) 66'; Grygera (red card) 87'	Stadium: Shakhtar Stadium; Attendance: 20,000; Referee: Atanas Uzunov (Bulgaria)

25 September 2000 5	Lazio (Italy)	5–1	(Ukraine) Shakhtar Donetsk	Rome, Italy
21:45 EEST (UTC+3)	Baronio (yellow card) 38'; López 48', 68', 90+3'; Favalli 54'; Verón 57'	Report	Vorobey 41'; Popov (yellow card) 61'	Stadium: Stadio Olimpico; Attendance: 14,746; Referee: Alain Sars (France)

7 November 2000 6	Shakhtar Donetsk (Ukraine)	3–0	(England) Arsenal	Donetsk, Ukraine
21:45 EET (UTC+2)	Atelkin 34'; Byelik (yellow card) 53' (goal) 66'; Vorobey 57'	Report	Cole (yellow card) 29'; Lauren (yellow card) 47'; Keown (yellow card) 59'	Stadium: Shakhtar Stadium; Attendance: 30,750; Referee: Knud Erik Fisker (Denmark)

=== UEFA Cup ===
==== Knockout stage ====
23 November 2000 Third round 1st leg	Shakhtar Donetsk (Ukraine)	0–0	(Spain) Celta Vigo	Donetsk, Ukraine
20:30 EET (UTC+2)	Tymoshchuk (yellow card) 88'	Report	Yao (yellow card) 63'	Stadium: Shakhtar Stadium; Attendance: 29,054; Referee: Rune Pedersen (Norway)

7 December 2000 Third round 2nd leg	Celta Vigo (Spain)	1–0 (1–0 agg.)	(Ukraine) Shakhtar Donetsk	Vigo, Spain
22:45 EET (UTC+2)	Catanha 28'	Report	Byelik (yellow card) 31'	Stadium: Balaídos; Attendance: 15,000; Referee: Günter Benkö (Austria)

== Squad statistics ==
As of match played 19 June 2001

=== Appearances and goals ===
No.	Pos	Nat	Player	Total		Vyshcha Liha		Ukrainian Cup		UEFA Champions League		UEFA Cup	
No.	Pos	Nat	Player	Apps	Goals	Apps	Goals	Apps	Goals	Apps	Goals	Apps	Goals
1	GK	(Ukraine) UKR	Yuriy Virt	38	0	26	0	0	0	10	0	2	0
2	DF	(Ukraine) UKR	Mykhaylo Starostyak	33	1	23	1	0	0	7+1	0	2	0
3	DF	(Lithuania) LTU	Dainius Gleveckas	29	1	17	0	0	0	10	1	2	0
4	MF	(Ukraine) UKR	Anatoliy Tymoshchuk	36	4	25	4	0	0	10	0	1	0
5	DF	(Ukraine) UKR	Serhiy Popov	36	7	25	7	0	0	9	0	2	0
6	MF	(Russia) RUS	Aleksei Bakharev	36	3	24	2	0	0	10	1	2	0
7	FW	(Nigeria) NGR	Julius Aghahowa	8	7	8	7	0	0	0	0	0	0
8	MF	(Ukraine) UKR	Serhiy Kovalyov	13	1	6	1	0	0	3+3	0	1	0
9	MF	(Ukraine) UKR	Hennadiy Zubov	36	12	24	9	0	0	10	3	2	0
10	FW	(Ukraine) UKR	Serhiy Atelkin	31	17	21	11	0	0	10	6	0	0
11	FW	(Ukraine) UKR	Andriy Vorobey	36	28	24	21	0	0	10	7	2	0
13	DF	(Senegal) SEN	Assane N'Diaye	11	1	11	1	0	0	0	0	0	0
14	DF	(Ukraine) UKR	Vyacheslav Shevchuk	18	0	11	0	0	0	6	0	1	0
15	DF	(Ukraine) UKR	Valeriy Kryventsov	12	0	7	0	0	0	1+4	0	0	0
17	MF	(Romania) ROU	Marian Aliuță	31	1	24	1	0	0	2+3	0	0+2	0
18	FW	(Romania) ROU	Marian Savu	11	3	8	3	0	0	0+1	0	0+2	0
19	MF	(Ukraine) UKR	Oleksiy Hai	3	0	3	0	0	0	0	0	0	0
19	FW	(Russia) RUS	Igor Strelkov	4	1	4	1	0	0	0	0	0	0
20	FW	(Ukraine) UKR	Oleksiy Byelik	22	4	11	2	0	0	0+9	2	2	0
21	MF	(Kazakhstan) KAZ	Vitaliy Abramov	28	0	17	0	0	0	8+1	0	1+1	0
22	DF	(Nigeria) NGR	Isaac Okoronkwo	24	0	18	0	0	0	3+1	0	2	0
25	DF	(Ukraine) UKR	Andriy Konyushenko	9	0	9	0	0	0	0	0	0	0
26	MF	(Ukraine) UKR	Oleh Pestryakov	2	0	2	0	0	0	0	0	0	0
27	MF	(Ukraine) UKR	Yaroslav Khoma	1	0	1	0	0	0	0	0	0	0
30	MF	(Ukraine) UKR	Hennadiy Orbu	2	0	2	0	0	0	0	0	0	0
Players away on loan:
Players who left Shakhtar Donetsk during the season:
13	MF	(Russia) RUS	Aleksandr Shmarko	7	0	3	0	0	0	1+3	0	0	0

=== Goalscorers ===
Place	Position	Nation	Number	Name	Vyshcha Liha	Ukrainian Cup	UEFA Champions League	UEFA Cup	Total
1	FW	(Ukraine)	11	Andriy Vorobey	21	6	7	0	34
2	FW	(Ukraine)	10	Serhiy Atelkin	11	2	6	0	19
3	MF	(Ukraine)	9	Hennadiy Zubov	9	0	3	0	12
4	DF	(Ukraine)	5	Serhiy Popov	7	1	0	0	8
4	FW	(Nigeria)	7	Julius Aghahowa	7	1	0	0	8
6	FW	(Ukraine)	20	Oleksiy Byelik	2	2	2	0	6
7	MF	(Ukraine)	4	Anatoliy Tymoshchuk	4	1	0	0	5
8	FW	(Romania)	18	Marian Savu	3	0	0	0	3
8	MF	(Russia)	6	Aleksei Bakharev	2	0	1	0	3
10	MF	(Romania)	17	Marian Aliuță	1	1	0	0	2
11	MF	(Ukraine)	8	Serhiy Kovalyov	1	0	0	0	1
11	DF	(Senegal)	13	Assane N'Diaye	1	0	0	0	1
11	DF	(Ukraine)	2	Mykhaylo Starostyak	1	0	0	0	1
11	FW	(Russia)	19	Igor Strelkov	1	0	0	0	1
11	DF	(Lithuania)	3	Dainius Gleveckas	0	0	1	0	1
11				Own goal	0	0	1	0	1
TOTALS					71	14	21	0	106

=== Clean sheets ===
Place	Position	Nation	Number	Name	Vyshcha Liha	Ukrainian Cup	UEFA Champions League	UEFA Cup	Total
1	GK	(Ukraine)	1	Yuriy Virt	9	0	2	1	12
TOTALS					9	1	2	1	13

=== Disciplinary record ===
Number	Nation	Position	Name	Vyshcha Liha		Ukrainian Cup		Champions League		UEFA Cup		Total	
Number	Nation	Position	Name	Yellow card	Red card	Yellow card	Red card	Yellow card	Red card	Yellow card	Red card	Yellow card	Red card
1	(Ukraine)	GK	Yuriy Virt	0	0	0	0	1	0	0	0	1	0
2	(Ukraine)	DF	Mykhaylo Starostyak	3	0	0	0	2	0	0	0	5	0
3	(Lithuania)	DF	Dainius Gleveckas	3	0	0	0	2	0	0	0	5	0
4	(Ukraine)	MF	Anatoliy Tymoshchuk	3	0	0	0	1	0	1	0	5	0
5	(Ukraine)	DF	Serhiy Popov	5	0	0	0	4	1	0	0	9	1
6	(Russia)	MF	Aleksei Bakharev	2	0	0	0	0	0	0	0	2	0
9	(Ukraine)	MF	Hennadiy Zubov	3	0	0	0	2	0	0	0	5	0
10	(Ukraine)	FW	Serhiy Atelkin	4	0	0	0	1	0	0	0	5	0
11	(Ukraine)	FW	Andriy Vorobey	3	0	0	0	1	0	0	0	4	0
13	(Senegal)	DF	Assane N'Diaye	3	0	0	0	0	0	0	0	3	0
14	(Ukraine)	DF	Vyacheslav Shevchuk	1	0	0	0	1	0	0	0	2	0
17	(Romania)	MF	Marian Aliuță	2	0	0	0	1	0	0	0	3	0
20	(Ukraine)	FW	Oleksiy Byelik	0	0	0	0	1	0	1	0	2	0
21	(Kazakhstan)	MF	Vitaliy Abramov	0	0	0	0	1	0	0	0	1	0
22	(Nigeria)	DF	Isaac Okoronkwo	1	0	0	0	0	0	0	0	1	0
25	(Ukraine)	DF	Andriy Konyushenko	1	0	0	0	0	0	0	0	1	0
Players away on loan:
Players who left Shakhtar Donetsk during the season:
13	(Russia)	MF	Aleksandr Shmarko	0	0	0	0	1	0	0	0	1	0
			TOTALS	34	0	0	0	19	1	2	0	55	1
