= 2002 Ukrainian Cup final =

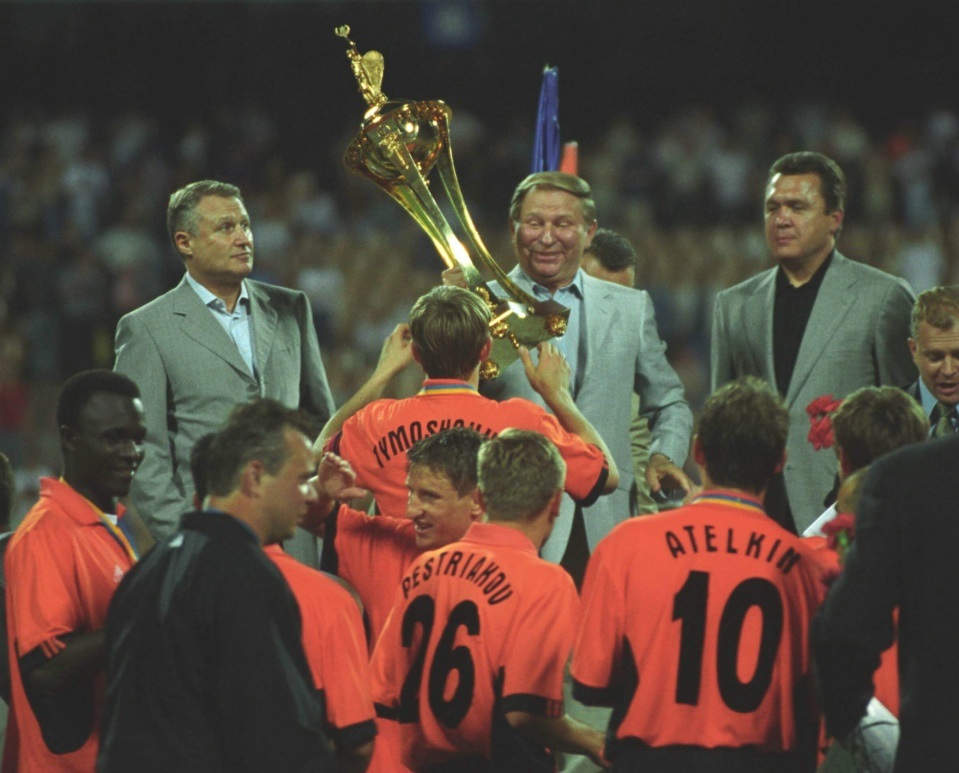
- Event: Ukrainian Cup 2001-02
| Shakhtar Donetsk | Dynamo Kyiv |
| 3 | 2 |
- Date: 26 May 2002
- Venue: NSC Olimpiyskiy, Kyiv
- Referee: Vasyl Melnychuk (Simferopol)
- Attendance: 81,000
- Weather: 26 °C

The 2002 Ukrainian Cup final was a football match that took place at the NSC Olimpiyskiy on May 26, 2002. The match was the 11th Ukrainian Cup Final and it was contested by Shakhtar Donetsk and Dynamo Kyiv. The 2002 Ukrainian Cup Final was the eleventh to be held in the Ukrainian capital Kyiv. Shakhtar won by three goals to two.

== Road to Kyiv ==
The Ukrainian Premier League clubs did not have to go through qualification rounds (there were five qualification rounds) starting right from the Round of 16.

Dynamo Kyiv

| Round of 16 (1st leg) | Obolon Kyiv | 0 – 3 | Dynamo Kyiv |
| Round of 16 (2nd leg) | Dynamo Kyiv | 3 – 0 | Obolon Kyiv |
| | (Dynamo won 6–0 on aggregate) | | |
| Quarter-final (1st leg) | Metalist Kharkiv | 1 – 1 | Dynamo Kyiv |
| Quarter-final (2nd leg) | Dynamo Kyiv | 5 – 0 | Metalist Kharkiv |
| | (Dynamo won 6–1 on aggregate) | | |
| Semi-final (1st leg) | Metalurh Donetsk | 1 – 1 | Dynamo Kyiv |
| Semi-final (2nd leg) | Dynamo Kyiv | 2 – 0 | Metalurh Donetsk |
| | (Dynamo won 3–1 on aggregate) | | |

Shakhtar Donetsk

| Round of 16 (1st leg) | Stal Alchevsk | 3 – 1 | Shakhtar Donetsk |
| Round of 16 (2nd leg) | Shakhtar Donetsk | 3 – 0 | Stal Alchevsk |
| | (Shakhtar won 4–3 on aggregate) | | |
| Quarter-final (1st leg) | Shakhtar Donetsk | 2 – 0 | Karpaty Lviv |
| Quarter-final (2nd leg) | Karpaty Lviv | 1 – 0 | Shakhtar Donetsk |
| | (Shakhtar won 2–1 on aggregate) | | |
| Semi-final (1st leg) | Dnipro Dnipropetrovsk | 2 – 1 | Shakhtar Donetsk |
| Semi-final (2nd leg) | Shakhtar Donetsk | 2 – 0 | Dnipro Dnipropetrovsk |
| | (Shakhtar won 3–2 on aggregate) | | |

== Match details ==
2002-05-26
19:00 LST

| Dynamo Kyiv | 2 – 3 | Shakhtar Donetsk |
|---|---|---|
| Valiatsin Bialkevich 31'; Maxim Shatskikh 50' | Report | 10' Serhiy Popov; 81' Serhiy Atelkin; 98' Andriy Vorobei |

NSC Olimpiyskiy, Kyiv
Attendance: 81,000
Referee: Vasyl Melnychuk (Simferopol)

| Dynamo Kyiv | Shakhtar Donetsk |

Dynamo Kyiv:
| GK | 1 | (Ukraine) Oleksandr Shovkovskyi |
| DF | 2 | (Ukraine) Andriy Nesmachny |
| DF | 3 | (Hungary) Laszlo Bodnar |
| MF | 4 | (Romania) Tiberiu Ghioane | (substituted off) 91' |
| DF | 5 | (Federal Republic of Yugoslavia) Goran Gavrancic |
| DF | 6 | (Ukraine) Vladyslav Vashchuk |
| MF | 7 | (Bulgaria) Georgi Peev | (substituted off) 77' |
| MF | 8 | (Ukraine) Andriy Husin |
| DF | 9 | (Ukraine) Serhiy Fedorov |
| FW | 10 | (Ukraine) Oleksandr Melashchenko | (substituted off) 16' |
| MF | 11 | (Belarus) Valiatsin Bialkevich |
Substitutes:
| GK | XX | (Ukraine) Vitaliy Reva |
| DF | XX | (Ukraine) Yuri Dmitrulin |
| MF | XX | (Ukraine) Ruslan Yermolenko |
| MF | XX | (Nigeria) Harrison Omoko |
| FW | XX | (Uzbekistan) Maxim Shatskikh | (substituted in) 16' |
| MF | XX | (Romania) Florin Cernat | (substituted in) 77' |
| MF | XX | (Nigeria) Lucky Idahor | (substituted in) 91' |
Manager:
(Ukraine) Oleksiy Mykhaylichenko

Shakhtar Donetsk:
| GK | 1 | (Poland) Wojciech Kowalewski | | (substituted off) 14' |
| DF | 2 | (Ukraine) Mykhailo Starostyak |
| DF | 3 | (Lithuania) Dainius Gleveckas | | (substituted off) 68' |
| DF | 4 | (Romania) Daniel Florea |
| DF | 5 | (Ukraine) Serhiy Popov |
| DF | 6 | (Senegal) Assane N'Diaye |
| MF | 7 | (Ukraine) Anatoliy Tymoshchuk | (yellow card) 60' |
| FW | 9 | (Ukraine) Andriy Vorobey |
| DF | 8 | (Poland) Mariusz Lewandowski | (yellow card) 119' |
| FW | 10 | (Ukraine) Oleksiy Bielik | | (substituted off) 72' |
| FW | 11 | (Ukraine) Hennadiy Zubov | (red card) 118' |
Substitutes:
| GK | XX | (Ukraine) Dmytro Shutkov | | (substituted in) 14' |
| XX | XX | (Ukraine) Ruslan Levyha |
| XX | XX | (Ukraine) Yevhen Bredun |
| XX | XX | (Romania) Marian Aliuta | | (substituted in) 68' |
| FW | XX | (Ukraine) Serhiy Atelkin | | (substituted in) 72' |
| XX | XX | (Ukraine) Andriy Konyushenko |
| XX | XX | (Ukraine) Oleh Pestryakov |
Manager:
(Italy) Nevio Scala

MATCH OFFICIALS

- Assistant referees:
  - Vitaliy Zvyahitsev (Odesa)
  - Taras Klym (Ivano-Frankivsk)
- Fourth official: Andriy Shandor (Lviv)

MATCH RULES

- 90 minutes.
- 30 minutes of extra-time if necessary.
- Penalty shoot-out if scores still level.
- Seven named substitutes
- Maximum of 3 substitutions.
