= 2001 Ukrainian Cup final =

- Event: Ukrainian Cup 2000-01
Shakhtar Donetsk	CSKA Kyiv
2	1
- Date: 27 May 2001
- Venue: NSC Olimpiyskiy, Kyiv
- Referee: V. Melnychuk (Simferopol)
- Attendance: 55,000
- Weather: 17 °C

The 2001 Ukrainian Cup final was a football match that took place at the NSC Olimpiyskiy on May 27, 2001. The match was the 10th Ukrainian Cup Final and it was contested by Shakhtar Donetsk and CSKA Kyiv. The 2001 Ukrainian Cup Final was the tenth to be held in the Ukrainian capital Kyiv. Shakhtar won by two goals.

== Match details ==
2001-05-27
17:00 LST

CSKA Kyiv	1 – 2	Shakhtar Donetsk
Ruslan Kostyshyn 7'	Report	78', 119' Serhiy Atelkin

NSC Olimpiyskiy, Kyiv
Attendance: 55,000
Referee: Vasyl Melnychuk (Simferopol)

CSKA Kyiv	Shakhtar Donetsk

GK	1	(Ukraine) Vitaliy Reva
2	(Ukraine) Vitaliy Balytskyi
3	(Ukraine) Oleksandr Maltsev	(yellow card) 116'
4	(Ukraine) Andriy Annenkov	(substituted off) 71'
5	(Ukraine) Andriy Kyrlyk
6	(Ukraine) Serhiy Bilozor
7	(Ukraine) Oleksandr Oleksiyenko
8	(Ukraine) Roman Monaryov
9	(Ukraine) Serhiy Zakarlyuka	(substituted off) 65'
10	(Ukraine) Ruslan Kostyshyn
11	(Ukraine) Mykola Volosyanko	(yellow card) 109'
Substitutes:
(Ukraine) Pavlo Blazhayev
(Russia) Oleg Polyarush
14	(Ukraine) Serhiy Tkachenko	(substituted in) 71'	(substituted off) 96'
13	(Ukraine) Roman Pakholyuk	(substituted in) 96'
16	(Ukraine) Volodymyr Matsihura	(substituted in) 65'
(Georgia (country)) Levan Mikadze
(Ukraine) Volodymyr Polishchuk
Manager:
(Ukraine) Mykhailo Fomenko

GK	1	(Ukraine) Yuri Virt
DF	2	(Ukraine) Mykhailo Starostyak
DF	13	(Senegal) Assane N'Diaye
MF	4	(Ukraine) Anatoliy Tymoshchuk		(substituted off) 70'
DF	5	(Ukraine) Serhiy Popov
	6	(Russia) Aleksei Bakharev		(substituted off) 67'
	7	(Nigeria) Julius Aghahowa	(yellow card) 110'
	17	(Romania) Marian Aliuta
	9	(Ukraine) Hennadiy Zubov	(yellow card) 82'
	22	(Nigeria) Isaac Okoronkwo
FW	11	(Ukraine) Andriy Vorobey		(substituted off) 112'
Substitutes:
GK	12	(Ukraine) Dmytro Shutkov
DF	3	(Lithuania) Dainius Gleveckas
FW	10	(Ukraine) Serhiy Atelkin	(yellow card) 78'	(substituted in) 67'
	25	(Ukraine) Andriy Konyushenko		(substituted in) 70'
		(Kazakhstan) Vitaliy Abramov		(substituted in) 112'
		(Ukraine) Vyacheslav Shevchuk
		(Russia) Igor Strelkov
Manager:
(Ukraine) Viktor Prokopenko

Match officials

- Assistant referees:
  - Vitaliy Zvyahitsev (Odesa)
  - Anatoliy Oliynyk (Simferopol)
- Fourth official: Valeriy Onufer (Uzhhorod)

Match rules

- 90 minutes
- 30 minutes of extra time if necessary
- Penalty shoot-out if scores still level
- Seven named substitutes
- Maximum of three substitutions
