= Oleksiy Byelik =

Ukrainian footballer (born 1981)

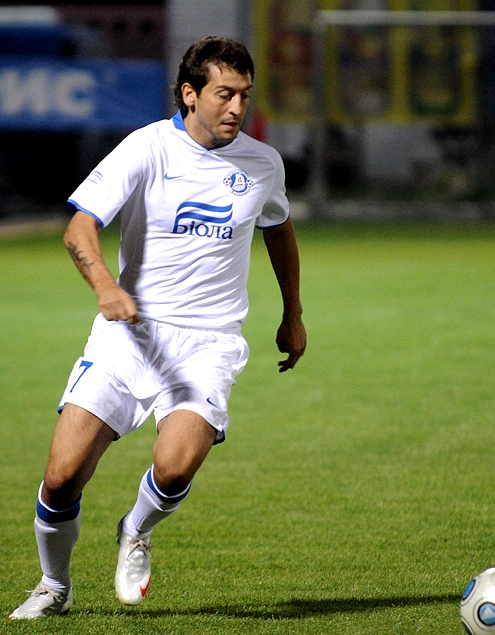

Personal information
- Full name: Oleksiy Hryhorovych Byelik
- Date of birth: 15 February 1981 (age 45)
- Place of birth: Donetsk, Ukrainian SSR
- Height: 1.85 m (6 ft 1 in)
- Position: Forward

Team information
- Current team: Orizare (manager)

Youth career
- –1998: Shakhtar Donetsk

Senior career*
Years	Team	Apps	(Gls)
1998–2008	Shakhtar Donetsk	144	(51)
1998–2004	→ Shakhtar-2 Donetsk	60	(15)
2008	→ VfL Bochum (loan)	4	(0)
2008–2011	Dnipro Dnipropetrovsk	25	(4)
2011–2012	Metalurh Zaporizhzhia	24	(13)
Total		257	(83)

International career
2000–2003	Ukraine U21	29	(7)
2004–2007	Ukraine	19	(5)
Medal record
Men's football
Representing Ukraine
UEFA European Under-18 Championship
Runner-up	2000 Germany
- * Club domestic league appearances and goals

Oleksiy Hryhorovych Byelik (Ukrainian: Олексій Григорович Бєлік; born 15 February 1981) is a Ukrainian former professional footballer who played as a forward. He played for the Ukraine national team, and appeared on the main squad for the 2006 FIFA World Cup. Also with three goals scored, Byelik was a leading scorer for the Ukraine U-20 team at the 2001 FIFA World Youth Championship. He was also on the Ukraine U18 squad at final of the 2000 UEFA European Under-18 Championship.

== Career ==
=== Shakhtar Donetsk ===
Born in Donetsk, Ukrainian SSR, Byelik started his career in Shakhtar Donetsk. He was a regular starter for the club until 2006 FIFA World Cup, after which he was seldom used.

=== VfL Bochum ===
In the January 2008 transfer window, Byelik was loaned from Shakhtar to Bundesliga side VfL Bochum. He made his first start for VfL Bochum against VfL Wolfsburg, where he hit the post and received a yellow card, but was substituted in the 58th minute. He was used in a total of four games and returned to Shakhtar in the summer of 2008.

=== Dnipro Dnipropetrovsk ===
On 5 August 2008, after some short negotiations Byelik signed with Dnipro Dnipropetrovsk on a three-year contract, with a transfer fee of $5.5 million. He debuted for the club on 23 August 2008, in a league match which Dnipro ended drawing 0–0. Byelik was subbed in the 59th minute and made an impact with a few of his shots. He also got a yellow card in the 90+1 minute for shooting the ball after it was called offside.

=== Metalurh Zaporizhya ===
He last played for Metalurh Zaporizhya in the Ukrainian First League.

== International career ==
He was one of the leaders of the Ukrainian junior team (24 games, 15 goals) and youth teams (27 games, 17 goals) at the 2001 FIFA U-20 World Cup in Argentina, scoring three goals in three group stage games and helping the team reach the 1-8 final, where it lost to future semi-finalists from Paraguay. In February 2002, he was called up to the Ukrainian Olympic team by head coach Anatoliy Kroshchenko.

In early September 2004, he was called up to the country's team and scored in the first game against Kazakhstan. His second goal in official games was against Georgia. In total, he has played 20 games and 5 goals for the national team. He was considered to be Andrei Shevchenko's double, but only made it to the main squad in case of injury to the captain of the national team. At the 2006 FIFA World Cup, he came on as a substitute in a match against Italy, playing the last 20 minutes.

== Career statistics ==
=== Club ===
As of 13 April 2012

Appearances and goals by club, season and competition
Club	Season	League		Cup		Europe		Super Cup		Total	
Club	Season	Apps	Goals	Apps	Goals	Apps	Goals	Apps	Goals	Apps	Goals
Shakhtar	1999–00	8	4	2	0	–		–		10	4
Shakhtar	2000–01	11	2	3	2	11	2	–		25	6
Shakhtar	2001–02	21	3	3	0	3	0	–		27	3
Shakhtar	2002–03	28	21	7	3	3	1	–		38	25
Shakhtar	2003–04	11	2	2	1	4	0	–		18	3
Shakhtar	2004–05	19	5	5	1	2	0	–		26	6
Shakhtar	2005–06	23	7	3	1	5	0	1	0	32	8
Shakhtar	2006–07	21	7	4	3	4	0	–		29	10
Shakhtar	2007–08	2	0	3	0	–		–		5	0
Shakhtar	Total	144	51	32	11	32	3	1	0	209	65
VfL Bochum (loan)	2007–08	4	0	–		–		–		4	0
Dnipro Dnipropetrovsk	2008–09	18	4	2	2	–		–		20	6
Dnipro Dnipropetrovsk	2009–10	7	0	2	0	–		–		9	0
Dnipro Dnipropetrovsk	2010–11	–		–		–		–		–	
Dnipro Dnipropetrovsk	Total	25	4	4	2	0	0	0	0	29	6
Metalurh Zaporizhya	2011–12	16	13	2	0	–		–		18	13
Metalurh Zaporizhya	2012–13	8	0	–		–		–		8	0
Metalurh Zaporizhya	Total	24	13	2	0	0	0	0	0	26	13
Career total		197	68	38	13	32	3	1	0	268	85

=== International ===
Scores and results list Ukraine's goal tally first, score column indicates score after each Byelik goal.

List of international goals scored by Oleksiy Byelik
No.	Date	Venue	Opponent	Score	Result	Competition
1	8 September 2004	Almaty Central Stadium, Almaty, Kazakhstan	Kazakhstan		1–2	2006 World Cup qualification
2	12 October 2004	Ukraina Stadium, Lviv, Ukraine	Georgia		2–0	2006 World Cup qualification
3	28 May 2006	Olimpiyskiy National Sports Complex, Kyiv, Ukraine	Costa Rica		4–0	Friendly
4	5 June 2006	Sportanlage Buechenwald, Gossau, St. Gallen, Switzerland	Libya		3–0	Friendly
5	15 August 2006	Dynamo Stadium, Kyiv, Ukraine	Azerbaijan		6–0	Friendly

== Honours ==
- Ukrainian Premier League: 2001–02, 2004–05, 2005–06
- Ukrainian Cup: 2000–01, 2001–02, 2003–04
- UEFA European Under-19 Championship runner-up: 2000

== See also ==
- 2001 FIFA World Youth Championship squads#Ukraine
