= 2001–02 Ukrainian Cup =

Kubok Ukrainy
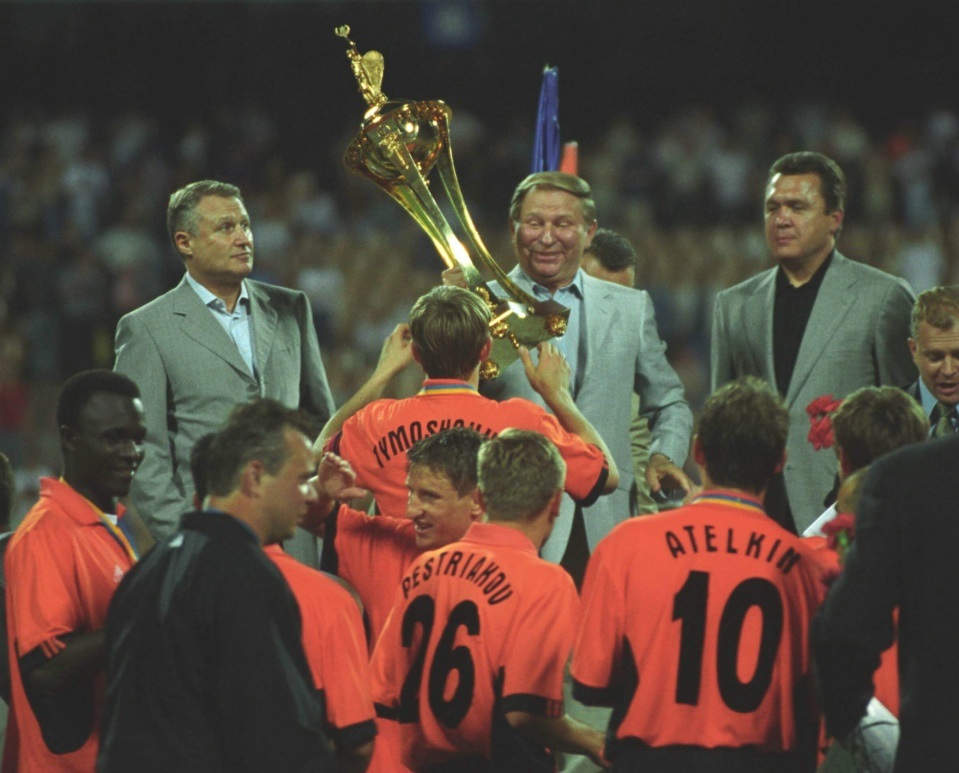
- The President of Ukraine passes over the National Cup

Tournament details
- Country: Ukraine
- Dates: 14 July 2001 – 26 May 2002
- Teams: 59

Final positions
- Champions: Shakhtar Donetsk (4th title)
- Runners-up: Dynamo Kyiv

The 2001–02 Ukrainian Cup was the 11th annual edition of Ukraine's football knockout competition, known as the Ukrainian Cup. The winner of this competition was Shakhtar Donetsk.

== Team allocation ==
=== Distribution ===
	Teams entering in this round	Teams advancing from previous round
First preliminary round (32 teams)	32 participants of the Second League	
Second preliminary round (16 teams)		16 participants of the first preliminary round
Third preliminary round (8 teams)		8 participants of the second preliminary round
First qualifying round (16 teams)	12 participants of the First League (lower seeded)	4 participants of the third preliminary round
Second qualifying round (16 teams)	6 participants of the Supreme League (lower seeded); 2 participants of the First League (higher seeded)	8 winners from the first qualifying round
Tournament proper (16 teams)	8 participants of the Supreme League (higher seeded)	8 winners from the second qualifying round

=== Round and draw dates ===
All draws held at FFU headquarters (Building of Football) in Kyiv unless stated otherwise.

Phase	Round	Draw date	Game date	
Phase	Round	Draw date	First leg	Second leg
Preliminary	First preliminary round		14 July 2001	18 July 2001
Preliminary	Second preliminary round		26 July 2001	9 August 2001
Preliminary	Third preliminary round		17 August 2001	25 August 2001
Qualifying	First qualifying round		7 September 2001	16 September 2001
Qualifying	Second qualifying round		4 October 2001	14 October 2001
Main event	Round of 16		20–22 October 2001	27 October 2001
Main event	Quarter-finals		4–5 November 2001	26 November 2001
Main event	Semi-finals		4 April 2002	2 May 2002
Main event	Final	26 May 2002 at NSC "Olimpiyskiy", Kyiv		

== Competition schedule ==
=== First preliminary round ===
Olkom Melitopol	1 – 6	FC Cherkasy	1:3 and 0:3
Olimpiya Yuzhnoukrainsk	1 – 2	Ryhonda Bila Tserkva	0:1 and 1:1
Naftovyk Dolyna	3 – 8	FC Krasyliv	0:1 and 1:1
Halychyna Drohobych	1 – 2	Sokil Zolochiv	1:1 and 0:1
Hazovyk-Skala Stryi	1 – 0	Tsementnyk-Khorda Mykolaiv	0:0 and 1:0
Tekhno-Center Rohatyn	3 – 3	Enerhetyk Burshtyn	2:3 and 1:0
Lukor Kalush	1 – 3	Bukovyna Chernivtsi	1:2 and 0:1
Veres Rivne	2 – 2	Dynamo Lviv	1:2 and 1:0
Adoms Kremenchuk	– : +	Spartak Sumy
Systema-Boreks Borodyanka	0 – 1	FC Portovyk Illichivsk	0:1 and 0:0
Hirnyk-Sport Komsomolsk	3 – 6	Tytan Armyansk	3:4 and 0:2
Podillya Khmelnytskyi	2 – 1	SC Kherson	2:0 and 0:1
Oskil Kupyansk	+ : –	Avanhard Rovenky
Desna Chernihiv	– : +	Mashynobudivnyk Druzhkivka	5:0 and -:+
Arsenal Kharkiv	8 – 4	Frunzenets-Liha 99 Sumy	8:0 and 0:4
Zorya Luhansk	1 – 3	Elektron Romny	1:0 and 0:3

=== Second preliminary round ===
FC Cherkasy	5 – 2	Ryhonda Bila Tserkva	3:2 and 2:0
FC Krasyliv	4 – 6	Sokil Zolochiv	4:4 and 0:2
Hazovyk-Skala Stryi	0 – 2	Enerhetyk Burshtyn	0:1 and 0:1
Bukovyna Chernivtsi	2 – 2	Dynamo Lviv	2:1 and 0:1
Spartak Sumy	1 – 3	Portovyk Illichivsk	0:1 and 1:2
Tytan Armyansk	+ : –	Podillya Khmelnytskyi
Oskil Kupyansk	2 – 3	Mashynobudivnyk Druzhkivka	0:2 and 2:1
Arsenal Kharkiv	1 – 4	Elektron Romny	1:3 and 0:1

=== Third preliminary round ===
FC Cherkasy	4 – 4	Sokil Zolochiv	3:0 and 1:4
Enerhetyk Burshtyn	0 – 5	Dynamo Lviv	0:2 and 0:3
Portovyk Illichivsk	2 – 1	Tytan Armyansk	2:0 and 0:1
Mashynobudivnyk Druzhkivka	+ : –	Elektron Romny

=== First Qualification Round ===
Team 1	Agg.	Team 2	1st leg	2nd leg
SC Volyn-1 Lutsk	2–1	FC Cherkasy	1–0	1–1
FC Elektrometalurh-NZF Nikopol	+:–	FC Zirka Kirovohrad	0–1	1–1
FC Dynamo Lviv	0–6	FC Prykarpattia Ivano-Frankivsk	0–3	0–3
FC Mykolaiv	2–5	FC Obolon Kyiv	0–1	2–4
FC Chornomorets Odesa	3–2	FC Naftovyk Okhtyrka	2–0	1–2
FC Portovyk Illichivsk	2–3	FC Vinnytsia	2–1	0–2
FC Mashynobudivnyk Druzhkivka	bye	~~FC Lviv~~		
FC Polissya Zhytomyr	2–4	FC Borysfen Boryspil	2–1	0–3

=== Second Qualification Round ===
Team 1	Agg.	Team 2	1st leg	2nd leg
SC Volyn-1 Lutsk	1–0	FC Vorskla Poltava	1–0	0–0
FC Elektrometalurh-NZF Nikopol	2–6	FC Zakarpattia Uzhhorod	2–2	0–4
FC Prykarpattia Ivano-Frankivsk	0–2	FC Metalist Kharkiv	0–0	0–2
FC Nyva Ternopil	0–3	FC Obolon Kyiv	0–1	0–2
FC Polihraftekhnika Oleksandriya	5–1	FC Chornomorets Odesa	4–1	1–0
FC Vinnytsia	2–4	FC Kryvbas Kryvyi Rih	2–2	0–2
FC Stal Alchevsk	5–0	FC Mashynobudivnyk Druzhkivka	3–0	2–0
FC Borysfen Boryspil	1–3	FC Karpaty Lviv	0–2	1–1

=== First round ===
Team 1	Agg.	Team 2	1st leg	2nd leg
SC Volyn-1 Lutsk	3–5	FC Metalurh Donetsk	2–1	1–4
FC Metalurh Mariupol	1–6	FC Zakarpattia Uzhhorod	1–1	0–5
FC Metalurh Zaporizhia	1–2	FC Metalist Kharkiv	1–0	0–2
FC Obolon Kyiv	0–6	FC Dynamo Kyiv	0–3	0–3
FC Dnipro Dnipropetrovsk	3–2	FC Polihraftekhnika Oleksandriya	2–0	1–2
FC Kryvbas Kryvyi Rih	1–4	FC CSKA Kyiv	1–0	0–4
FC Stal Alchevsk	3–4	FC Shakhtar Donetsk	3–1	0–3
FC Karpaty Lviv	(a) 3–3	SC Tavriya Simferopol	2–0	1–3

=== Quarterfinals ===
Team 1	Agg.	Team 2	1st leg	2nd leg
FC Metalurh Donetsk	4–1	FC Zakarpattia Uzhhorod	1–0	3–1
FC Metalist Kharkiv	1–6	FC Dynamo Kyiv	1–1	0–5
FC Dnipro Dnipropetrovsk	0–0 (4–3 p)	FC CSKA Kyiv	0–0	0–0 (a.e.t.)
FC Shakhtar Donetsk	2–1	FC Karpaty Lviv	2–0	0–1

=== Semifinals ===
Team 1	Agg.	Team 2	1st leg	2nd leg
FC Metalurh Donetsk	1–3	FC Dynamo Kyiv	1–1	0–2
FC Dnipro Dnipropetrovsk	2–3	FC Shakhtar Donetsk	2–1	0–2

=== Final ===
26 May 2002
19:00 LST

Dynamo Kyiv (PL)	2–3 (a.e.t.)	(PL) Shakhtar Donetsk
Byalkevich 31'; Shatskikh 50'	Report	Popov 10'; Atelkin 81'; Vorobey 98'; Zubov (red card) 118'

NSC Olimpiyskiy, Kyiv
Attendance: 81,000
Referee: Vasyl Melnychuk
