= Marian Savu =

Romanian footballer

Personal information
- Date of birth: 11 October 1972 (age 54)
- Place of birth: Pietroșani, Teleorman, Romania
- Height: 1.77 m (5 ft 10 in)
- Position: Forward

Senior career*
Years	Team	Apps	(Gls)
1989–1990	Flacăra Moreni	0	(0)
1990–1995	Dinamo București	54	(19)
1991–1992	→ Flacăra Moreni (loan)		
1994	→ FC Brașov (loan)	12	(2)
1996	Rapid București	15	(1)
1996–2000	Național București	98	(47)
1998	→ Sportul Studențesc (loan)	17	(3)
2000–2001	Shakhtar Donetsk	8	(3)
2000–2001	→ Shakhtar-2 Donetsk	4	(1)
2001	Metalurh Donetsk	5	(0)
2002	Național București	11	(3)
2002–2003	AEL Limassol	25	(7)
2003–2004	Videoton FC Fehérvár	23	(3)
2004–2006	Național București	16	(2)
2006–2007	Petrolul Ploiești	3	(0)
Total		232	(78)

International career
1992–1993	Romania U21	12	(2)
2000	Romania B	1	(0)
- * Club domestic league appearances and goals

Marian Savu (born 11 October 1972) is a Romanian former professional footballer who played as a forward. Playing for clubs in four countries, he notably became the 1999–2000 Divizia A top goalscorer.

== Club career ==
Savu was born on 11 October 1972 in Pietroșani, Teleorman, Romania. He began playing football in 1989 at Flacăra Moreni. Subsequently, Savu joined Dinamo București where he made his Divizia A debut on 28 October 1990, when coach Gheorghe Mulțescu sent him in the 61st minute to replace Marian Damaschin in a 0–0 draw against Progresul Brăila. In 1991, he returned to Flacăra Moreni in Divizia B, playing there for eighteen months. Afterwards, he came back to Dinamo, scoring his first Divizia A goal on 9 June 1993 in a 6–0 win over CSM Reșița. He made his debut in European competitions in a 3–2 victory against Cagliari in the 1993–94 UEFA Cup. In the same season, Savu was Dinamo's top scorer, netting 12 league goals to help the team to a runner-up position. However, despite this performance, he was loaned to FC Brașov for the first half of the 1994–95 season. Then he returned to Dinamo, only to leave again in the middle of the 1995–96 season to join Rapid București.

In 1996, Savu went to play for Național București. He helped them eliminate Partizan Belgrade and Chornomorets Odesa in the first rounds of the 1996–97 UEFA Cup, the campaign ending after a 3–1 aggregate loss to Club Brugge. The team also reached the 1997 Cupa României final, but coach Florin Halagian did not play him in the 4–2 loss to Steaua București. In the middle of the 1997–98 season, he joined Sportul Studențesc but was unable to help them avoid relegation. Afterwards, Savu returned to Național, where he scored 39 league goals over the course of two seasons. Notably, during the 1999–2000 season, Savu formed an offensive partnership with Marius Lăcătuș under coach Mihai Stoichiță and netted a career-best 20 goals to become the league's top scorer.

In 2000, Savu moved to the Vyshcha Liha to play for Shakhtar Donetsk, where he became teammates with Marian Aliuță. He made his Vyshcha Liha debut on 12 July, playing the entire match under coach Viktor Prokopenko in a 3–0 win over Metalurh Donetsk. On 30 July, he scored a hat-trick in a 5–2 victory against Stal Alchevsk. He also featured in a 3–0 victory against Arsenal in the first group stage of the 2000–01 Champions League. In the autumn of 2001, Savu transferred to Metalurh Donetsk. He subsequently returned to Național for the 2001–02 season, before spending a year at AEL Limassol, where he scored seven goals in the Cypriot First Division. In 2003, he moved to Hungary, signing with Videoton FC Fehérvár, where he was teammates with fellow Romanians Gabriel Vochin, Daniel Tudor and Ion Voicu. On 2 August, he made his Nemzeti Bajnokság I debut, when coach János Csank sent him in the 52nd minute to replace Tomáš Medveď in a 2–2 draw against Ferencváros. Savu played 23 matches by the end of the 2003–04 season, scoring three goals across the two victories against Győr. He returned to Național for a third spell in 2004. The team reached the 2006 Cupa României final, but coach Cristiano Bergodi did not use him in the 1–0 loss to Rapid București.

Savu made his last Divizia A appearance on 11 April 2006 in Național's 2–0 loss to Jiul Petroșani, totaling 223 matches with 77 goals in the competition and 18 games with two goals in European competitions (including six appearances with one goal in the Intertoto Cup). He ended his career after playing three matches in the Liga II for Petrolul Ploiești during the 2006–07 season.

== International career ==
From 1992 to 1993, Savu played 12 matches and scored two goals for Romania's under-21 national team. On 19 May 2000, he played for Romania B in a 2–2 draw against Honduras.

== Honours ==
Național București

- Cupa României runner-up: 1996–97, 2005–06

Individual

- Divizia A top goalscorer: 1999–2000
