= 2000–01 Vyshcha Liha =

10th season of top-tier football league in Vyshcha Liha

Vyshcha Liha
- Season: 2000–01
- Dates: 12 July 2000 – 19 June 2001; 29 November 2000 – 10 March 2001 (winter break)
- Champions: Dynamo Kyiv; 9th title
- Relegated: Stal Alchevsk; Nyva Ternopil
- Champions League: Dynamo Kyiv; Shakhtar Donetsk
- UEFA Cup: CSKA Kyiv; Dnipro Dnipropetrovsk
- Top goalscorer: Andriy Vorobei (Shakhtar) (21 goals)
- Biggest home win: Shakhtar - Metalist 8:0
- Biggest away win: Nyva - Shakhtar 0:7
- Highest scoring: Nyva - Dynamo 3:7

The 2000–01 Vyshcha Liha season was the 10th since its establishment. FC Dynamo Kyiv were the defending champions.

== Teams ==
=== Promotions ===
- Stal Alchevsk, the runners-up of the 1999–2000 Ukrainian First League – (debut)

Note: the 1999–2000 Ukrainian First League was won by the second team of Dynamo Kyiv, FC Dynamo-2 Kyiv, which could not be promoted.

=== Location ===
Locations of teams home grounds in Ukrainian Premier League 2000-01

== Stadiums ==
Rank	Stadium	Place	Club	Capacity	Notes
1	Stadion "Metalist"	Kharkiv	Metalist Kharkiv	32,000	
2	Stadion "Shakhtar"	Donetsk	Shakhtar Donetsk	31,545	
3	Stadion "Meteor"	Dnipropetrovsk	Dnipro Dnipropetrovsk	30,000	
4	Stadion "Metalurh"	Kryvyi Rih	Kryvbas Kryvyi Rih	29,782	
5	Stadion "Ukraina"	Lviv	Karpaty Lviv	27,000	
6	Stadion "Lokomotyv"	Simferopol	Tavriya Simferopol	26,000	
7	Tsentralnyi Stadion "Metalurh"	Zaporizhia	Metalurh Zaporizhia	25,000	
8	Stadion "Vorskla"	Poltava	Vorskla Poltava	25,000	
9	Stadion "Dynamo"	Kyiv	Dynamo Kyiv	18,864	
10	Tsentralnyi Miskyi Stadion	Ternopil	Nyva Ternopil	17,000	
11	Stadion "Stal"	Alchevsk	Stal Alchevsk	12,500	
12	Stadion "CSK ZSU"	Kyiv	CSKA Kyiv	12,000	
13	Stadion "Azovstal"	Mariupol	Metalurh Mariupol	12,000	
14	Stadion imeni 125-richia DMZ	Donetsk	Metalurh Donetsk	4,000	

== Managers ==
Club	Coach	Replaced coach
FC Dynamo Kyiv	(Ukraine) Valery Lobanovsky	
FC Shakhtar Donetsk	(Ukraine) Viktor Prokopenko	
FC Dnipro Dnipropetrovsk	(Ukraine) Mykola Fedorenko	
FC Metalurh Mariupol	(Ukraine) Mykola Pavlov	
FC Metalurh Donetsk	(Ukraine) Semen Altman	
FC CSCA Kyiv	(Ukraine) Mykhailo Fomenko	
SC Tavriya Simferopol	(Ukraine) Valeriy Petrov	(Ukraine) Oleksandr Ischenko 24 games
FC Metalurh Zaporizhia	(Ukraine) Volodymyr Atamaniuk	(Ukraine) Myron Markevych 24 games
FC Metalist Kharkiv	(Ukraine) Viktor Udovenko	(Ukraine) Leonid Tkachenko the first half (Ukraine) Valeriy Shalychev 12 games
FC Karpaty Lviv	(Ukraine) Stepan Yurchyshyn	(Ukraine) Lev Brovarskyi 24 games
FC Kryvbas Kryvyi Rih	(Ukraine) Hennadiy Litovchenko	(Ukraine) Oleh Taran 8 games
FC Vorskla Poltava	(Ukraine) Serhiy Sobetskyi	(Ukraine) Anatoliy Konkov 7 games (Ukraine) Serhiy Morozov 18 games
FC Stal Alchevsk	(Ukraine) Anatoliy Volobuev	
FC Nyva Ternopil	(Ukraine) Ihor Biskup	(Ukraine) Valeriy Bohuslavskyi 8 games (Ukraine) Ihor Yavorskyi 7 games

=== Managerial changes ===
Team	Outgoing head coach	Manner of departure	Date of vacancy	Table	Incoming head coach	Date of appointment	Table
FC CSCA Kyiv	(Ukraine) Volodymyr Bezsonov			pre-season	(Ukraine) Mykhailo Fomenko		pre-season
FC Metalist Kharkiv	(Ukraine) Mykhailo Fomenko			pre-season	(Russia) Leonid Tkachenko		pre-season
SC Tavriya Simferopol	(Ukraine) Volodymyr Muntian			pre-season	(Ukraine) Oleksandr Ischenko		pre-season
FC Vorskla Poltava	(Ukraine) Anatoliy Konkov		August		(Ukraine) Serhiy Morozov	August	
FC Nyva Ternopil	(Ukraine) Valeriy Bohuslavsky		August		(Ukraine) Ihor Yavorsky	September	
FC Kryvbas Kryvyi Rih	(Ukraine) Oleh Taran		September		(Ukraine) Hennadiy Litovchenko	October	
FC Metalist Kharkiv	(Russia) Leonid Tkachenko		November		(Ukraine) Valeriy Shalychev	March	
FC Nyva Ternopil	(Ukraine) Ihor Yavorsky		March		(Ukraine) Ihor Biskup	April	
SC Tavriya Simferopol	(Ukraine) Oleksandr Ischenko		May		(Ukraine) Valeriy Petrov	June	
FC Metalurh Zaporizhia	(Ukraine) Myron Markevych		May		(Ukraine) Volodymyr Atamaniuk	June	
FC Karpaty Lviv	(Ukraine) Lev Brovarsky		May		(Ukraine) Stepan Yurchyshyn	June	
FC Metalist Kharkiv	(Ukraine) Valeriy Shalychev		June		(Ukraine) Viktor Udovenko	June	
FC Vorskla Poltava	(Ukraine) Serhiy Morozov		June		(Ukraine) Serhiy Sobetsky	June	

== League table ==
Pos	Team	Pld	W	D	L	GF	GA	GD	Pts	Qualification or relegation
1	Dynamo Kyiv (C)	26	20	4	2	58	17	+41	64	Qualification to Champions League third qualifying round
2	Shakhtar Donetsk (Note: Participant of the 2001 Ukrainian Cup Final)	26	19	6	1	71	21	+50	63	Qualification to Champions League second qualifying round
3	Dnipro Dnipropetrovsk	26	17	4	5	37	18	+19	55	Qualification to UEFA Cup first round
4	Metalurh Mariupol	26	13	4	9	35	26	+9	43	
5	Metalurh Donetsk	26	11	9	6	30	24	+6	42	
6	CSKA Kyiv	26	10	10	6	30	23	+7	40	Qualification to UEFA Cup qualifying round
7	Tavriya Simferopol	26	8	9	9	24	31	−7	33	Qualification to Intertoto Cup second round
8	Metalurh Zaporizhzhia	26	8	8	10	27	31	−4	32	
9	Metalist Kharkiv	26	8	7	11	27	37	−10	31	
10	Karpaty Lviv	26	9	3	14	33	42	−9	30	
11	Kryvbas Kryvyi Rih	26	6	6	14	22	36	−14	24	
12	Vorskla Poltava	26	6	5	15	16	29	−13	23	
13	Stal Alchevsk (R)	26	3	6	17	19	49	−30	15	Relegated to Ukrainian First League
14	Nyva Ternopil (R)	26	2	3	21	20	65	−45	9	Relegated to Ukrainian First League

Source: uafootball.net.ua
(C) Champions; (R) Relegated

== Results ==
Home \ Away	CSK	DNI	DYN	KAR	KRY	MET	MDO	MTM	MZA	NVT	SHA	STA	TAV	VOR
CSKA Kyiv	—	1–1	1–5	4–0	1–1	1–0	1–1	0–2	4–1	3–1	1–0	1–1	0–0	2–0
Dnipro	2–0	—	1–1	1–0	1–0	3–0	0–1	2–1	2–0	2–0	1–4	2–0	3–0	2–1
Dynamo Kyiv	1–0	2–1	—	1–1	4–2	1–0	2–0	2–0	2–1	6–0	1–2	2–0	3–0	2–1
Karpaty Lviv	1–0	0–2	2–0	—	2–1	2–0	1–2	3–0	0–1	2–1	0–2	2–1	4–1	3–0
Kryvbas Kryvyi Rih	0–1	1–1	0–2	5–2	—	2–1	3–2	0–0	0–0	0–1	0–4	1–0	0–0	-:+
Metalist Kharkiv	0–0	0–1	0–2	2–2	1–0	—	2–0	3–2	1–1	2–1	1–1	2–0	3–0	3–1
Metalurh Donetsk	1–1	1–0	0–0	1–0	3–0	2–1	—	1–0	1–1	2–0	1–3	0–0	0–0	0–0
Metalurh Mariupol	1–1	0–1	0–2	2–0	2–0	2–1	1–0	—	3–1	5–1	1–3	2–0	2–0	1–0
Metalurh Zaporizhzhia	1–1	1–2	0–1	1–0	2–2	2–0	2–2	-:+	—	2–0	2–3	2–3	0–2	0–0
Nyva Ternopil	1–3	0–2	3–7	5–2	0–2	1–1	2–3	1–1	0–1	—	0–7	0–0	0–2	1–3
Shakhtar Donetsk	0–0	3–1	1–1	3–2	2–1	8–0	3–0	3–1	1–1	2–1	—	3–1	5–0	1–0
Stal Alchevsk	1–2	0–1	0–5	1–1	1–0	2–2	0–3	0–4	1–2	1–0	2–5	—	0–1	0–1
Tavriya Simferopol	0–1	1–1	1–2	3–1	3–0	0–0	1–1	1–1	0–1	3–0	0–0	3–2	—	2–1
Vorskla Poltava	1–0	0–1	0–1	2–0	0–1	0–1	0–2	0–1	0–1	1–0	2–2	2–2	0–0	—

Source: uafootball.net.ua
Legend: Blue = home team win; Yellow = draw; Red = away team win.

== Top goalscorers ==
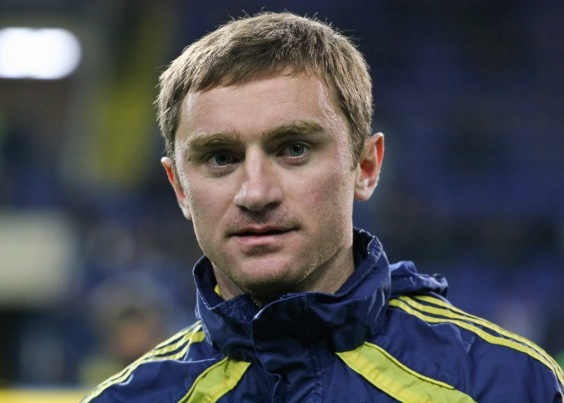
Vorobey

(Ukraine) Andriy Vorobei	Shakhtar Donetsk	21 (4)
(Ukraine) Ivan Hetsko	Metalist Kharkiv / Kryvbas Kryvyi Rih	14 (4)
(Ukraine) Serhiy Atelkin	Shakhtar Donetsk	11
(Ukraine) Oleksandr Rykun	Metalurh Mariupol	11 (3)
(Ukraine) Olexandr Melashchenko	Dynamo Kyiv / Vorskla Poltava	10
(Ukraine) Stepan Molokutsko	Metalurh Mariupol	9 (1)
(Ukraine) Hennady Zubov	Shakhtar Donetsk	9 (1)
(Ukraine) Vasyl Shved	Karpaty Lviv	8
(Georgia (country)) Georgi Demetradze	Dynamo Kyiv	8 (1)
(Nigeria) Julius Aghahowa	Shakhtar Donetsk	7
(Belarus) Valentin Belkevich	Dynamo Kyiv	7
(Ukraine) Serhiy Popov	Shakhtar Donetsk	7
(Ukraine) Artem Yashkin	Dynamo Kyiv	7
(Ukraine) Serhiy Zakarlyuka	CSCA Kyiv	7

Notable Transfers

- Georgi Demetradze, FC Dynamo Kyiv to Real Sociedad
- Serhiy Zakarlyuka, CSCA Kyiv to FC Metalurh Donetsk
