= 2000–01 Ukrainian Cup =

Kubok Ukrainy

Tournament details
- Country: Ukraine
- Dates: 16 September 2000 – 27 May 2001
- Teams: 28

Final positions
- Champions: Shakhtar Donetsk (3rd title)
- Runners-up: CSKA Kyiv

The 2000–01 Ukrainian Cup was the tenth annual edition of Ukraine's football knockout competition, known as the Ukrainian Cup. The winner of this competition was Shakhtar Donetsk, beating CSKA Kyiv in the final.

== Round and draw dates ==
All draws held at FFU headquarters (Building of Football) in Kyiv unless stated otherwise.

Round	Draw date	Game date
Round of 32	?	16–19 September 2000
Round of 16	?	23 September 2000
Quarter-finals	?	2 November 2000
Semi-finals	?	11 April 2001
Final	27 May 2001 at NSC "Olimpiyskiy", Kyiv	

== Competition schedule ==
=== First round ===
First three games took place on September 16, 2000 (Oleksandriya, Sumy, Zolochiv), while most of the games took place on September 17. Also the game in Chernivstsi was conducted on September 18 and in Zhytomyr – on September 19.

Polihraftekhnika Oleksandriya	0 – 3	Shakhtar Donetsk
Spartak Sumy	0 – 0	Dynamo Kyiv	penalty kicks 4:2 (Avanhard Stadium, Sumy)
Sokil Zolochiv	2 – 1	Stal Alchevsk	played on Sokil Stadium in Lviv
Zakarpattia Uzhhorod	+ : –	Tytan Armyansk	Tytan refused to participate
Chornomorets Odesa	3 – 1	Karpaty Lviv
FC Cherkasy	0 – 1	Nyva Ternopil
Metalurh Nikopol	1 – 3	Dnipro Dnipropetrovsk
FC Lviv	0 – 0	FC Vinnytsia	penalty kicks 3:1
Prykarpattia Ivano-Frankivsk	1 – 3	Metalurh Zaporizhzhia
Zirka Kirovohrad	1 – 2	Metalurh Donetsk	in extra time
SC Mykolaiv	0 – 3	Tavriya Simferopol
Borysfen Boryspil	1 – 2	CSKA Kyiv
Mashynobudivnyk Druzhkivka	1 – 1	Metalist Kharkiv	penalty kicks 4:5
Metalurh Mariupol	3 – 2	Volyn Lutsk	Played on Azovstal Stadium in Mariupol
Bukovyna Chernivtsi	0 – 1	Kryvbas Kryvyi Rih
Polissya Zhytomyr	2 – 1	Vorskla Poltava

=== Second round ===
All games took place on September 23, 2000.

FC Lviv	2 – 0	Chornomorets Odesa	played on SKA Stadium in Lviv
Dnipro Dnipropetrovsk	3 – 1	Metalurh Zaporizhzhia	in extra time (Meteor Stadium in Dnipropetrovsk)
Spartak Sumy	3 – 2	Tavriya Simferopol	played on Avanhard Stadium in Sumy
Metalist Kharkiv	0 – 2	Kryvbas Kryvyi Rih
CSKA Kyiv	2 – 0	Nyva Ternopil	played on CSK ZSU Stadium in Kyiv
Sokil Zolochiv	0 – 2	Metalurh Mariupol	played on Sokil Stadium in Lviv
Zakarpattia Uzhhorod	1 – 2	Shakhtar Donetsk
Polissya Zhytomyr	0 – 1	Metalurh Donetsk

=== Quarterfinals ===
All games took place on November 2, 2000.

Metalurh Donetsk	0 – 2	Metalurh Mariupol	played on 125th DMZ Anniversary Stadium in Donetsk
Spartak Sumy	1 – 4	CSKA Kyiv	played on Avanhard Stadium in Sumy
Dnipro Dnipropetrovsk	1 – 0	FC Lviv	played on Meteor Stadium in Dnipropetrovsk
Kryvbas Kryvyi Rih	1 – 5	Shakhtar Donetsk	in extra time

=== Semifinals ===
All games took place on April 11, 2001.

11 April 2001
17:00 LST

CSKA Kyiv (PL)	3–1 (a.e.t.)	(PL) Dnipro Dnipropetrovsk
Bilozir 94'; Monaryov 96'; Kostyshyn 104'	Report	Valyayev 97'

CSK ZSU Stadium, Kyiv
Attendance: 7,000
Referee: Ihor Khiblin
11 April 2001
16:00 LST

Metalurh Mariupol (PL)	1–2	(PL) Shakhtar Donetsk
Molokutsko 69'	Report	Aghahowa 19'; Vorobey 57'

Azovstal Stadium, Mariupol
Attendance: 12,000
Referee: Ihor Yarmenchuk

=== Final ===
27 May 2001
17:00 LST

CSKA Kyiv (PL)	1–2 (a.e.t.)	(PL) Shakhtar Donetsk
Kostyshyn 7'	Report	Atelkin 78', 119'

NSC Olimpiyskiy, Kyiv
Attendance: 55,000
Referee: Vasyl Melnychuk

== See also ==
- 2000–01 Ukrainian Second League Cup
