= Yaroslav Khoma =

Ukrainian footballer

Personal information
- Full name: Yaroslav Bohdanovych Khoma
- Date of birth: 17 February 1974 (age 52)
- Place of birth: Kolbayevychi, Lviv Oblast, Ukrainian SSR, Soviet Union
- Height: 1.86 m (6 ft 1 in)
- Position: Midfielder

Senior career*
Years	Team	Apps	(Gls)
1993–1995	Promin Sambir	29	(1)
1995–1996	Volyn Lutsk	7	(0)
1996	→ Kovel-Volyn Kovel	2	(0)
1996–1999	Podillya Khmelnytskyi	91	(7)
1999–2001	Karpaty Lviv	33	(1)
1999–2001	→ Karpaty-2 Lviv	3	(1)
2001	Shakhtar Donetsk	1	(0)
2001	→ Shakhtar-2 Donetsk	10	(1)
2001–2004	Karpaty Lviv	55	(3)
2001	→ Karpaty-3 Lviv	2	(0)
2004–2005	Metalurh Zaporizhya	8	(0)
2005–2006	Volyn Lutsk	8	(0)
2006	Kryvbas Kryvyi Rih	0	(0)
Total		249	(14)

International career
2001	Ukraine	1	(0)
- * Club domestic league appearances and goals

Yaroslav Bohdanovych Khoma (Ukrainian: Ярослав Богданович Хома; born 17 February 1974) is a Ukrainian former footballer who played as a midfielder and made one appearance for the Ukraine national team.

== Career ==
Khoma made his only international appearance for Ukraine on 20 February 2001 in a friendly match against Georgia, which finished as a 0–0 draw.

== Career statistics ==
=== International ===
Ukraine
Year	Apps	Goals
2001	1	0
Total	1	0
