= Marian Aliuță =

Romanian footballer

Personal information
- Date of birth: 4 February 1978 (age 48)
- Place of birth: Bucharest, Romania
- Position: Midfielder

Youth career
- 1986–1995: Steaua București

Senior career*
Years	Team	Apps	(Gls)
1995–1997	Steaua București	0	(0)
1995–1996	→ Steaua Mizil	14	(4)
1996–1997	→ Chindia Târgovişte (loan)	17	(2)
1997	→ Gloria Bistriţa (loan)	12	(0)
1997–1998	Farul Constanţa	25	(2)
1998–2000	Sheriff Tiraspol	26	(3)
2000–2002	Shakhtar Donetsk	47	(1)
2000–2002	→ Shakhtar-2 Donetsk	7	(0)
2002–2004	FCSB	50	(5)
2004–2005	Rapid București	10	(1)
2005	Jeonnam Dragons	0	(0)
2005–2006	Metalurh Donetsk	23	(2)
2006	Changchun Yatai	13	(1)
2006–2007	Iraklis	10	(1)
2007–2008	Politehnica Timişoara	24	(1)
2008	FC Vaslui	11	(0)
2008–2010	Neftchi Baku	31	(5)
Total		314	(26)

International career^{‡}
2001–2008	Romania	5	(0)
- * Club domestic league appearances and goals as of 1 May 2010 ‡ National team caps and goals as of 10 September 2008

Marian Aliuță (born 4 February 1978) is a Romanian former professional footballer who played as midfielder.

== Career ==
Aliuță started to play football at Steaua București and as soon as he reached the age of 18 is loaned to Steaua Mizil and then to Chindia Târgovişte and Gloria Bistriţa. Released from him contract with Steaua București, Aliuță signed with Farul Constanţa in 1997 and then with Sheriff Tiraspol one year later.

Year 1999 finds him in Ukraine, playing for Shakhtar Donetsk from where he returned to Romania in 2002 to finally make his debut for Steaua București. At that time being, with US$135,000 the highest paid footballer from Divizia A. Despite being voted as The Best Player of Divizia A at the end of 2002–03 season, Aliuță leaves Steaua București after an altercation with the club's chief executive Mihai Stoica. Rapid Bucharest is his next club, which he left after only few weeks to play in Korea for Chunnam Dragons and then in the 2005–06 season he played for Metalurh Donetsk.

In November 2006, he signed a two-year contract with Iraklis. After a one-year spell in Greece, he returned to Romania where he signed for FC Timişoara, a club with a huge fan base. In the summer of 2008, he moved to UEFA Cup contenders FC Vaslui. But after only 11 games he had a dispute with the club's powerful owner, Adrian Porumboiu and was given a free transfer. In the beginning of 2009 signed for the Azerbaijan club Neftchi Baku, joining his long-time friend Adrian Neaga.

== Honours ==
Sheriff Tiraspol

- Moldovan Cup: 1998–99

Shakhtar Donetsk

- Ukrainian Premier League: 2001–02
- Ukrainian Cup: 2000–01, 2001–02

Vaslui

- UEFA Intertoto Cup: 2008
