= Serhiy Kovalyov =

Ukrainian footballer and manager

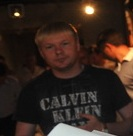

Personal information
- Full name: Serhiy Mykolayovych Kovalyov
- Date of birth: 21 November 1971 (age 54)
- Place of birth: Donetsk, Ukrainian SSR
- Height: 1.76 m (5 ft 9 1/2 in)
- Position: Midfielder

Senior career*
Years	Team	Apps	(Gls)
1992–1993	FC Dynamo-2 Kyiv	20	(1)
1993	FC Nyva Myronivka	10	(0)
1993–1994	FC Bazhanovets Makiyivka	22	(6)
1994–2000	FC Shakhtar Donetsk	104	(6)

International career
1998–2000	Ukraine	10	(1)

Managerial career
- 2002–2009: Shakhtar Donetsk academy (assistant)
- 2009–2013: FC Shakhtar-3 Donetsk
- 2013–2015: Shakhtar Donetsk youth team
- 2015–2017: Shakhtar U19
- 2018–2021: Metalurh Zaporizhya (assistant)
- 2021–2022: Oleksandriya (assistant)
- * Club domestic league appearances and goals

Serhiy Kovalyov (Ukrainian: Сергій Миколайович Ковальов; 21 November 1971 in Donetsk Oblast, Ukrainian SSR) was a Ukrainian professional footballer and currently is football manager.

His first trainer was P. Ponomarenko.

Due to medical condition, Kovalyov was forced to retire from playing.

== Career statistics ==
=== International goals ===
No.	Date	Venue	Opponent	Score	Result	Competition
1	19 August 1998	Olimpiyskiy National Sports Complex, Kyiv, Ukraine	Georgia	4–0	4–0	Friendly match

== Honours ==
- Ukrainian Premier League runner-up: 1997, 1998, 1999, 2000.
- Ukrainian Cup winner: 1995, 1997, 2001.
