= Dmytro Shutkov =

Ukrainian footballer (born 1972)

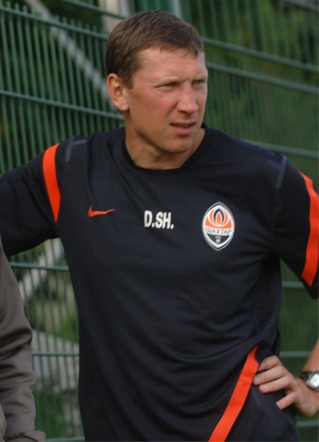

Personal information
- Full name: Dmytro Anatoliyovych Shutkov
- Date of birth: 3 April 1972 (age 54)
- Place of birth: Donetsk, Ukrainian SSR, Soviet Union
- Height: 1.87 m (6 ft 2 in)
- Position: Goalkeeper

Team information
- Current team: Shakhtar Donetsk (youth goalies coach)

Youth career
- 1989–1991: Shakhtar Donetsk

Senior career*
Years	Team	Apps	(Gls)
1991–2008	Shakhtar Donetsk	267	(0)
1998–2002	→ Shakhtar-2 Donetsk	41	(0)

International career
1993–2003	Ukraine	5	(0)

Managerial career
- 2008–: Shakhtar Donetsk (youth goalies coach)
- * Club domestic league appearances and goals

Dmytro Anatoliyovych Shutkov (Ukrainian: Дмитро Анатолійович Шутков, born 3 April 1972) is a retired Ukrainian footballer who played in Ukrainian Premier League club Shakhtar Donetsk his entire career. Now he is a part of goalkeeper coaching staff of Shakhtar.

== Career statistics ==
=== Club ===
Club	Season	League		Cup		Europe		Total	
Club	Season	Apps	GA	Apps	GA	Apps	GA	Apps	GA
Shakhtar	1991	1	0	2	1	-	-	3	1
Shakhtar	1992	19	13	6	4	-	-	25	17
Shakhtar	1992–93	24	26	2	5	-	-	26	31
Shakhtar	1993–94	29	28	3	4	-	-	32	32
Shakhtar	1994–95	33	29	9	5	2	4	44	38
Shakhtar	1995–96	29	32	4	2	4	3	37	37
Shakhtar	1996–97	30	28	6	3	3	6	39	37
Shakhtar	1997–98	30	24	3	6	6	9	39	39
Shakhtar	1998–99	14	14	1	0	-	-	15	14
Shakhtar	1999–00	1	1	-	-	-	-	1	1
Shakhtar	2000–01	-							
Shakhtar	2001–02	9	3	2	4	-	-	11	7
Shakhtar	2002–03	20	14	7	4	1	0	28	18
Shakhtar	2003–04	7	1	5	1	-	-	12	2
Shakhtar	2004–05	2	0	1	1	2	1	5	2
Shakhtar	2005–06	9	2	3	4	3	0	15	6
Shakhtar	2006–07	8	5	2	3	3	6	13	14
Shakhtar	2007–08	2	2	-	-	-	-	2	2
Career totals		267	222	56	47	24	29	347	298
