= Andriy Huzenko =

Ukrainian association football player

Andriy Guzenko
Personal information
- Full name: Andriy Leonidovych Guzenko
- Date of birth: 19 February 1973 (age 53)
- Place of birth: Nikopol, Ukrainian SSR
- Height: 1.78 m (5 ft 10 in)
- Position: Midfielder

Youth career
- DVUFK Dnipropetrovsk

Senior career*
Years	Team	Apps	(Gls)
1990	FC Kolos Nikopol	11	(0)
1991–1992	CSK ZSU Kyiv	30	(0)
1992–1993	FC Nyva-Borysfen Myronivka	4	(0)
1993	FC Karpaty Lviv	9	(0)
1993	FC Vorskla Poltava	17	(0)
1994–1995	FC Torpedo Zaporizhzhia	48	(4)
1995–1997	MFC Mykolaiv	44	(8)
1997	FC Vorskla Poltava	13	(2)
1998	FC Krylia Sovetov Samara	3	(0)
1998–2003	FC Vorskla Poltava	86	(3)
1998–2003	→ FC Vorskla-2 Poltava (loans)	26	(2)
2003	FC Irtysh Pavlodar	11	(1)
2003	FC Ekibastuzets	10	(1)
2004–2006	FC Esil Bogatyr	86	(10)
2007–2008	FC Atyrau	36	(1)
2009	FC Krystal Kherson (amateur)		
2009–2010	FC Nikopol		
2010	FC Elektrometalurh-NZF Nikopol (amateur)		

Managerial career
- 2010–2012: FC Stal Dniprodzerzhynsk (assistant)
- 2012: FC Stal Dniprodzerzhynsk
- 2013: FC Metalurh Zaporizhzhia (assistant)
- * Club domestic league appearances and goals

Andriy Leonidovych Guzenko (Ukrainian: Андрій Леонідович Гузенко; born 19 February 1973) is a Ukrainian football coach and former player.

== Honours ==
FC Irtysh Pavlodar

- Kazakhstan Premier League: 2003
