= Serhiy Atelkin =

Ukrainian footballer (1972–2020)

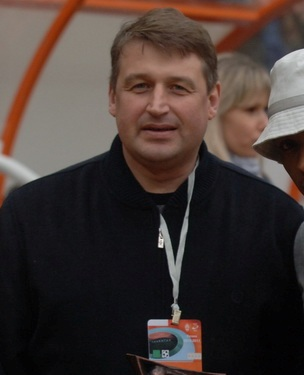

Personal information
- Full name: Serhiy Valeriyovych Atelkin
- Date of birth: 8 January 1972
- Place of birth: Kirovske, Donetsk Oblast, Ukrainian SSR
- Date of death: 1 October 2020 (aged 48)
- Place of death: Lviv, Ukraine
- Position: Forward

Youth career
- Kirovske sports school

Senior career*
| Years | Team | Apps | (Gls) |
| 1989 | Antratsyt Kirovske | | |
| 1989–1997 | Shakhtar Donetsk | 158 | (47) |
| 1996 | → Kremin Kremenchuk (loan) | 14 | (5) |
| 1996 | → Shakhtar-2 Donetsk (loan) | 1 | (0) |
| 1997–1999 | Lecce | 16 | (3) |
| 1998–1999 | → Boavista (loan) | 10 | (3) |
| 2000–2002 | Shakhtar Donetsk | 45 | (14) |
| 2000–2002 | → Shakhtar-2 Donetsk (loan) | 14 | (3) |
| 2002 | Metalurh Donetsk | 12 | (1) |
| 2002 | → Metalurh-2 Donetsk (loan) | 4 | (0) |
| Total | | 270 | (76) |

International career
| 1997 | Ukraine | 2 | (0) |
- * Club domestic league appearances and goals

Serhiy Atelkin (Ukrainian: Сергій Ателькін, 8 January 1972 – 1 October 2020) was a Ukrainian footballer. Atelkin became the first player from the independent Ukraine to play in the Italian Serie A.

== Playing career ==
Atelkin started to play football on streets and a local Soviet tournament for teenagers and children "Leather Ball" (Kozhanyi Myach). Eventually he was invited to play for an amateur city team and then a regional amateur team of Donetsk Oblast where he was noticed by Shakhtar Donetsk head coach Valeriy Yaremchenko. Initially he was invited to play for the Shakhtar's reserves along with Oleksandr Martyuk and Dmytro Shutkov.

Atelkin made his name playing as a striker for the likes of Shakhtar Donetsk (1990–1997, 2000–2002), U.S. Lecce (Italy 1997–1998) and Boavista FC (Portugal 1998–1999). Despite success in domestic competitions, Atelkin only played for the Ukraine national football team twice. In 1996 Atelkin spent a short stint in Kremenchuk for FC Kremin Kremenchuk. During the 1997–98 UEFA Cup Winners' Cup the second round match between Shakhtar and Vicenza, Atelkin was noticed by the Lecce's scouts and the Vicenza sports director Sergio Vignoni who later became sports director for Lecce and vouched for him. After that he signed a three-year contract with the Italian club that just got promotion to the Serie A. In 1998 Atelkin got injured and lost his sports form, while U.S. Lecce got relegated. Due to more strict limitations on foreign players Atelkin lost his place on the team, but was loaned out to play in Portugal. However he never fully regained his former form and was not able to make a team. At the end of the 1999 season he returned to Lecce to find out that he was not needed. Atelkin, through legal proceedings, broke his three-year contract to become a free agent.

Next year, Atelkin was able to sign a new contract with his former club Shakhtar Donetsk, for which he only played 14 games in two seasons. In 2002 Atelkin signed with Metalurh Donetsk, but only played one game. He returned to Shakhtar Donetsk in 2003.

== Achievements ==
He was also notable for joining Oleh Matveyev as one of the better forward partnership in the 1990s in the Ukrainian Premier League. Together with Andriy Shevchenko he holds a record for the most goals scored (4) in the finals of the Ukrainian Cup. He also had three seasons of scoring over 10 goals (1993, 1997, 2001). In 2002, he finally became the champion of Ukraine with FC Shakhtar Donetsk. Atelkin was also a four-time holder of the Ukrainian Cup.

== Personal life and death ==
In interview to Sport-Ekspress in 2007, Atelkin said that he was studying and training to become a coal miner by attending a local vocational school (technicum) in Kirovske.

According to official web-site of Shakhtar, Serhiy Atelkin suffered from a heart attack in the beginning of December 2008.

Atelkin died of a second heart attack on 1 October 2020, at the age of 48. His obituary among others was also posted by Lecce Sports Union.

== Career statistics ==
=== Club ===
| Club | Season | League | | Cup | | Europe | | Other | | Total | |
| Club | Season | Apps | Goals | Apps | Goals | Apps | Goals | Apps | Goals | Apps | Goals |
|---|---|---|---|---|---|---|---|---|---|---|---|
| Shakhtar | 1989 | 0 | 0 | 0 | 0 | - | - | 1 | 0 | 1 | 0 |
| Shakhtar | 1990 | 5 | 0 | 2 | 0 | - | - | 2 | 0 | 9 | 0 |
| Shakhtar | 1991 | 15 | 0 | 3 | 0 | - | - | - | - | 18 | 0 |
| Shakhtar | 1992 | 17 | 2 | 5 | 0 | - | - | - | - | 22 | 2 |
| Shakhtar | 1992–93 | 29 | 11 | 2 | 1 | - | - | - | - | 31 | 12 |
| Shakhtar | 1993–94 | 27 | 11 | 3 | 1 | - | - | - | - | 30 | 12 |
| Shakhtar | 1994–95 | 19 | 6 | 7 | 1 | 2 | 0 | - | - | 28 | 7 |
| Shakhtar | 1995–96 | 7 | 0 | 0 | 0 | 1 | 1 | - | - | 8 | 1 |
| Kremin | 1995–96 | 14 | 5 | 4 | 1 | - | - | - | - | 18 | 6 |
| Shakhtar | 1996–97 | 24 | 11 | 4 | 1 | - | - | - | - | 28 | 12 |
| Shakhtar | 1997–98 | 15 | 6 | 2 | 1 | 5 | 5 | - | - | 22 | 12 |
| Lecce | 1997–98 | 16 | 3 | - | - | - | - | - | - | 16 | 3 |
| Lecce | 1998–99 | - | - | 4 | 0 | - | - | - | - | 4 | 0 |
| Boavista | 1998–99 | 10 | 3 | - | - | - | - | - | - | 10 | 3 |
| Shakhtar | 1999–00 | 9 | 1 | 2 | 1 | - | - | - | - | 11 | 2 |
| Shakhtar | 2000–01 | 21 | 11 | 5 | 2 | 10 | 6 | - | - | 36 | 19 |
| Shakhtar | 2001–02 | 15 | 2 | 5 | 1 | 4 | 0 | - | - | 24 | 3 |
| Metalurh D | 2002–03 | 12 | 1 | 4 | 0 | - | - | - | - | 16 | 1 |
| Total for Shakhtar | | 203 | 61 | 40 | 9 | 22 | 12 | 3 | 0 | 268 | 82 |
| Career totals | | 255 | 73 | 52 | 10 | 22 | 12 | 3 | 0 | 332 | 95 |

=== International games ===
Serhiy Atelkin: International Games
| Game | Date | Venue | Opponent | Minutes | Result | Competition |
|---|---|---|---|---|---|---|
| 1. | 1997-10-11 | Yerevan, Armenia | Armenia | 10 | Won | WC 1998 Qual |
| 2. | 1997-10-29 | Zagreb, Croatia | Croatia | 54 | Lost | WC 1998 Qual (play-off) |
