= Dainius Gleveckas =

Lithuanian footballer

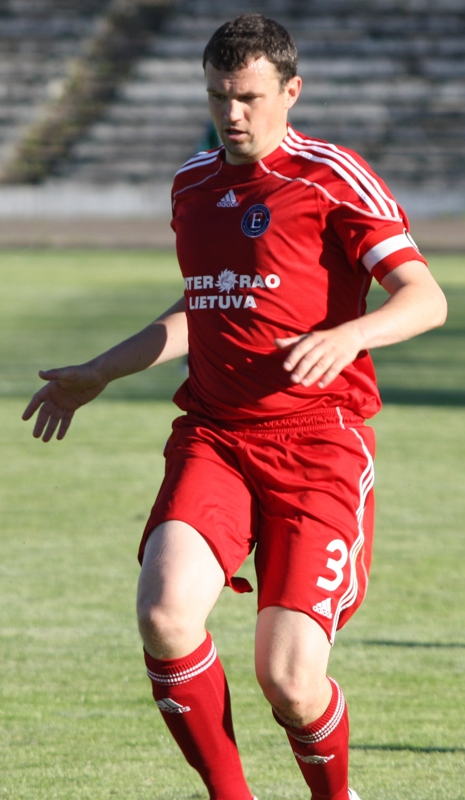
- Gleveckas in 2010

Personal information
- Date of birth: 5 March 1977 (age 49)
- Place of birth: Panevėžys, Lithuanian SSR
- Height: 1.86 m (6 ft 1 in)
- Position: Centre-back

Senior career*
| Years | Team | Apps | (Gls) |
| 1994–1999 | Ekranas | 79 | (12) |
| 1999–2004 | Shakhtar Donetsk | 64 | (2) |
| 1999–2004 | → Shakhtar-2 Donetsk | 39 | (2) |
| 2004–2006 | Illichivets Mariupol | 10 | (0) |
| 2007–2012 | Ekranas | 115 | (12) |
| Total | | 407 | (28) |

International career
| 1997–2003 | Lithuania | 34 | (0) |
- * Club domestic league appearances and goals

Dainius Gleveckas (born 5 March 1977) is a retired Lithuanian football defender.
