= Andriy Vorobey =

Ukrainian footballer

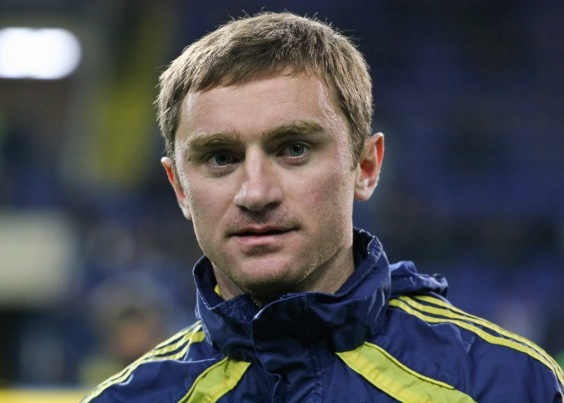
- Vorobey in 2011

Personal information
- Full name: Andriy Oleksiyovych Vorobey
- Date of birth: 29 November 1978 (age 47)
- Place of birth: Donetsk, Ukrainian SSR (now Ukraine)
- Height: 1.78 m (5 ft 10 in)
- Position: Striker

Youth career
- 1988–1995: Shakhtar Donetsk

Senior career*
Years	Team	Apps	(Gls)
1995–2007	Shakhtar Donetsk	219	(80)
1995–1999	→ Shakhtar-2 Donetsk (loan)	92	(23)
2007–2009	Dnipro Dnipropetrovsk	47	(12)
2009–2010	→ Arsenal Kyiv (loan)	23	(9)
2010–2013	Metalist Kharkiv	26	(4)
2013	→ Helios Kharkiv (loan)	6	(0)
2013–2015	Desna Pohreby	2	(0)
Total		413	(128)

International career
2000–2008	Ukraine	68	(9)
- * Club domestic league appearances and goals

Andriy Oleksiyovych Vorobey (Ukrainian: Андрій Олексійович Воробей; born 29 November 1978) is a Ukrainian former professional footballer who played as a striker. He was a three times national champion while playing for FC Shakhtar Donetsk. In 2000 the magazine Komanda recognized him as the best player in the league. During his career Vorobey netted over 100 goals in the Ukrainian Premier League, while in the 2000–01 season he became the league's top scorer.

When playing for the national team he was second striker under Andriy Shevchenko. While playing in Shakhtar Donetsk he started as a centre forward, but he became second striker behind Brandão.

== Club career ==
=== Shakhtar Donetsk ===
Vorobey started his career in Shakhtar Donetsk in 1994. He was promoted to the senior team in 1997. In the 2000–01 season Vorobey was the leading scorer with 21 goals. He amassed 79 goals in 209 matches in the Ukrainian Premier League playing for Shakhtar Donetsk. His total career for the Shakhtar senior team lasted ten years.

In 2000/01 he set the Ukraine Premier League record for scoring goals in games in a row, 9 goals in 7 games.

=== Dnipro Dnipropetrovsk ===
Vorobey signed a three-year contract with FC Dnipro Dnipropetrovsk on 17 June 2007. He scored his first goal in European Competition for FC Dnipro Dnipropetrovsk in the 2007–08 UEFA Cup, in a 1–1 draw with Aberdeen, however Dnipro were eliminated by Aberdeen on the away goal rule.

=== Metalist Kharkiv ===
On 28 May 2010 it was officially announced that Vorobey had signed a two-year contract at Metalist.

== International career ==
Vorobey has been on the Ukraine national football team since 2000. Notably, he was on Ukraine's FIFA World Cup 2006 squad, where Ukraine got to the quarterfinals losing to their champions Italy.

His last goal for Ukraine was in the UEFA Euro 2008 Qualifying match against Faroe Islands, which Ukraine won 5–0. Vorobey scored the last goal of the match in the 64th minute.

== Career statistics ==
=== Club ===
Appearances and goals by club, season and competition
Club	Season	League		Ukrainian Cup		Europe		Ukrainian Super Cup		Total	
Club	Season	Apps	Goals	Apps	Goals	Apps	Goals	Apps	Goals	Apps	Goals
Shakhtar Donetsk	1997–98	9	0	2	0	1	0	–		12	0
Shakhtar Donetsk	1998–99	18	11	4	2	3	0	–		25	13
Shakhtar Donetsk	1999–2000	24	15	2	0	2	0	–		28	15
Shakhtar Donetsk	2000–01	24	21	5	6	12	7	–		41	34
Shakhtar Donetsk	2001–02	25	9	6	5	6	2	–		37	16
Shakhtar Donetsk	2002–03	29	8	6	5	4	1	–		39	14
Shakhtar Donetsk	2003–04	29	9	5	2	6	0	–		40	11
Shakhtar Donetsk	2004–05	29	4	6	1	13	1	1	0	49	6
Shakhtar Donetsk	2005–06	16	1	2	0	3	1	1	0	22	2
Shakhtar Donetsk	2006–07	16	2	6	1	4	0	0	0	26	3
Shakhtar Donetsk	Total	219	80	44	22	54	12	2	0	319	114
Dnipro Dnipropetrovsk	2007–08	26	7	1	0	3	1	–		30	8
Dnipro Dnipropetrovsk	2008–09	21	5	1	0	2	0	–		24	5
Dnipro Dnipropetrovsk	Total	47	12	2	0	5	1	–		54	13
Arsenal Kyiv	2009–10	23	9	1	0	–		–		24	9
Metalist Kharkiv	2010–11	20	4	1	0	8	0	–		29	4
Metalist Kharkiv	2011–12	5	0	0	0	0	0	–		5	0
Metalist Kharkiv	2012–13	1	0	1	1	0	0	–		2	1
Metalist Kharkiv	Total	26	4	2	1	8	0	–		36	5
Career total		315	105	49	23	67	13	2	0	433	141

=== International ===
Appearances and goals by national team and year
National team	Year	Apps	Goals
Ukraine	2000	5	0
Ukraine	2001	12	4
Ukraine	2002	9	1
Ukraine	2003	9	0
Ukraine	2004	6	0
Ukraine	2005	6	0
Ukraine	2006	13	3
Ukraine	2007	6	1
Ukraine	2008	2	0
Total		68	9

Scores and results list Ukraine's goal tally first, score column indicates score after each Vorobey goal.

List of international goals scored by Andriy Vorobey
No.	Date	Venue	Opponent	Score	Result	Competition	Ref.
1	28 February 2001	GSZ Stadium, Larnaca, Cyprus	Cyprus	2–2	3–4	Friendly	
2	28 February 2001	GSZ Stadium, Larnaca, Cyprus	Cyprus	3–2	3–4	Friendly	
3	5 September 2001	Ukraina Stadium, Lviv, Ukraine	Armenia	2–0	3–0	2002 FIFA World Cup qualification	
4	5 September 2001	Ukraina Stadium, Lviv, Ukraine	Armenia	3–0	3–0	2002 FIFA World Cup qualification	
5	12 October 2002	Olympic Stadium, Kyiv, Ukraine	Greece	1–0	2–0	UEFA Euro 2004 qualifying	
6	28 May 2006	Olympic Stadium, Kyiv, Ukraine	Costa Rica	2–0	4–0	Friendly	
7	5 June 2006	Gossau, Switzerland	Libya	3–0	3–0	Friendly	
8	15 August 2006	Valeriy Lobanovskyi Dynamo Stadium, Kyiv, Ukraine	Azerbaijan	5–0	6–0	Friendly	

== Honours ==
Shakhtar Donetsk

- Ukrainian Premier League: 2001–02, 2004–05, 2005–06
- Ukrainian Cup: 2000–01, 2001–02, 2003–04
- Ukrainian Super Cup: 2005

Individual

- Ukrainian Premier League Top Scorer: 2000–01
- Ukrainian Footballer of the Year (Komanda): 2000
- Ukrainian Cup Top Scorer: 2000–01, 2001–02, 2002–03
- Serhiy Rebrov club: 105 goals
