= Assane N'Diaye =

Senegalese footballer

Personal information
- Full name: Assane N'Diaye
- Date of birth: August 1, 1974
- Place of birth: Nguekoh, Senegal
- Date of death: February 13, 2008 (aged 33)
- Place of death: Dakar, Senegal
- Height: 1.87 m (6 ft 2 in)
- Position: Defender

Senior career*
Years	Team	Apps	(Gls)
1995–2000	ASC Jeanne d'Arc	110	(7)
2001–2003	Shakhtar Donetsk	57	(4)
2001–2003	→ Shakhtar-2 Donetsk	6	(2)
2004–2005	ASC Diaraf	?	(?)
2005–2006	ASC Jeanne d'Arc	?	(?)

International career
1999–2001	Senegal	37	(3)
- * Club domestic league appearances and goals

Assane N'Diaye (August 1, 1974 – February 13, 2008) was a football defender from Senegal. As well as playing in the centre of defence, N'Diaye was accomplished as a defensive midfielder. His main footballing attributes were mostly physical, his strength and pace in particular, however he also was an unnervingly accurate passer. He played a key role for Shakhtar Donetsk during their first league win in 2002. Around the time of his move to Shakhtar, he was very highly rated and great things were expected of him. His attributes on Championship Manager 01/02 in particular, showed his perceived potential. However, one of the criticisms directed at N'Diaye was his supposed lack of passion and determination, something which may have halted his ascent to the top level of football.

He died in 2008 after a short illness at the age of 33.
