= 2001–02 Vyshcha Liha =

11th season of top-tier football league in Vyshcha Liha

Vyshcha Liha
- Season: 2001–02
- Champions: Shakhtar Donetsk; 1st title
- Relegated: Zakarpattia Uzhhorod
- Champions League: Shakhtar Donetsk; Dynamo Kyiv
- UEFA Cup: Metalurh Donetsk; Metalurh Zaporizhia
- Top goalscorer: (12) Serhiy Shyschenko (Metalurh Donetsk)
- Biggest home win: Dynamo - Metalist 6:0
- Biggest away win: Kryvbas - Dynamo 0:7
- Highest scoring: Zakarpattia - Metalist 3:5; Polihraftekhnika - Dnipro 2:6

The 2001–02 Vyshcha Liha season was the 11th since its establishment. FC Dynamo Kyiv were the defending champions.

== Teams ==
=== Promotions ===
- Zakarpattia Uzhhorod, the runners-up of the 2000–01 Ukrainian First League – (debut)
- Polihraftekhnika Oleksandriya, the third placed of the 2000–01 Ukrainian First League – (debut)

Note: the 2000–01 Ukrainian First League was won by the second team of Dynamo Kyiv, FC Dynamo-2 Kyiv, which could not be promoted.

=== Renamed ===
- FC CSKA Kyiv owned by the Ministry of Defense of Ukraine was sold to the Kyiv city authorities headed by Oleksandr Omelchenko. The club was reorganized and renamed as FC Arsenal Kyiv to commemorate SC Arsenal that existed before 1960s.

=== Location ===
Locations of teams home grounds in Ukrainian Premier League 2001-02

== Managers ==
Club	Coach	Replaced coach	Home stadium
Shakhtar Donetsk	(Italy) Nevio Scala	(Ukraine) Viktor Prokopenko	Shakhtar Stadium
Dynamo Kyiv	(Ukraine) Oleksiy Mykhaylychenko	(Ukraine) Valeriy Lobanovskyi	Dynamo Stadium
Metalurh Donetsk	(Ukraine) Semen Altman		Metalurh Stadium
Metalurh Zaporizhzhia	(Ukraine) Oleh Taran	(Ukraine) Volodymyr Atamanyuk	Metalurh Stadium; AvtoZAZ Stadium
Metalist Kharkiv	(Ukraine) Mykhaylo Fomenko		Metalist Stadium
Dnipro Dnipropetrovsk	(Ukraine) Yevhen Kucherevskyi	(Ukraine) Mykola Fedorenko	Meteor Stadium
Tavriya Simferopol	(Ukraine) Anatoliy Zayayev	(Ukraine) Valeriy Petrov	Lokomotyv Stadium
Karpaty Lviv	(Ukraine) Lev Brovarskyi	(Ukraine) Myron Markevych	Ukraina Stadium
Kryvbas Kryvyi Rih	(Ukraine) Ihor Nadein	(Ukraine) Hennadiy Lytovchenko	Metalurh Stadium
Metalurh Mariupol	(Ukraine) Mykola Pavlov		Illichivets Stadium
Vorskla Poltava	(Ukraine) Andriy Bal		Vorskla Stadium
Arsenal Kyiv	(Ukraine) Oleh Kuznetsov	(co-coach (Ukraine) Volodymyr Bezsonov)	CKS ZSU Stadium
Polihraftekhnika Oleksandriya	(Ukraine) Roman Pokora		Nika Stadium
Zakarpattia Uzhhorod	(Ukraine) Yuriy Kalitvintsev		Avanhard Stadium

== League table ==
Pos	Team	Pld	W	D	L	GF	GA	GD	Pts	Qualification or relegation
1	Shakhtar Donetsk (C)	26	20	6	0	49	10	+39	66	Qualification to Champions League third qualifying round
2	Dynamo Kyiv	26	20	5	1	62	9	+53	65	Qualification to Champions League second qualifying round
3	Metalurh Donetsk	26	12	6	8	38	28	+10	42	Qualification to UEFA Cup first round
4	Metalurh Zaporizhzhia	26	11	7	8	25	22	+3	40 (Note: Head-to-head points: Metalurh 7 pts, Metalist 9 pts, Dnipro 1 pt; On decision of the FFU executive committee, Metalurh had better head-to-head record with both Metalist and Dnipro separately (see #European qualifications case).)	Qualification to UEFA Cup qualifying round (Note: Metalurh Zaporizhia obtained the uncontested European competitions berth (both Shakhtar and Dynamo were participants of the 2002 Ukrainian Cup Final) after it was awarded the 4th place on the decision the Executive Committee of Football Federation of Ukraine. According to the Metalist head coach Mykhailo Fomenko, the club's leadership did not contested the decision as it was afraid for obligation to invest more funds in the club, plus the home stadium had to be reconstructed.)
5	Metalist Kharkiv	26	11	7	8	35	36	−1	40	
6	Dnipro Dnipropetrovsk	26	11	7	8	30	20	+10	40	
7	Tavriya Simferopol	26	8	6	12	27	36	−9	30	
8	Karpaty Lviv	26	7	8	11	19	31	−12	29	
9	Kryvbas Kryvyi Rih	26	6	10	10	28	40	−12	28	
10	Illichivets Mariupol	26	6	8	12	29	42	−13	26	
11	Vorskla Poltava	26	6	7	13	19	33	−14	25	
12	Arsenal Kyiv	26	6	5	15	18	28	−10	23 (Note: ARK 2–0 POL; POL 1–0 ARK)	
13	Polihraftekhnika	26	5	8	13	21	39	−18	23	Qualification to relegation playoffs
14	Zakarpattia Uzhhorod (R)	26	5	6	15	23	49	−26	21	Relegated to Ukrainian First League

Source: uafootball.net.ua
Rules for classification: 1st points; 2nd head-to-head points; 3rd head-to-head goal difference; 4th head-to-head goals scored away; 4th overall wins; 5th goal difference; 6th goals scored
(C) Champions; (R) Relegated

=== European qualifications case ===
Because both finalists of the 2002 Ukrainian Cup Final Dynamo and Shakhtar qualified for the UEFA Champions League, the fourth European competition berth was to be awarded to the best fourth placed team in the league competition. The fourth place with 40 points earned was Metalist Kharkiv, however there were two more teams with the same number of points Metalurh Zaporizhia and Dnipro Dnipropetrovsk. According to the 2001-02 season regulations the first tie breaker in case of even points were the head-to-head points among the teams that tied. Therefore originally Metalist Kharkiv was the main contender to qualify for the European competitions. However, the administration of FC Metalurh Zaporizhia argued the fact that their team head better head-to-head record with both Metalist Kharkiv (2 1-0-1 2-2 with an away goal) and Dnipro Dnipropetrovsk (2 1-1-0 2-1). On 16 June 2002 the FFU Executive Committee came up with its final decision awarding Metalurh Zaporizhia with qualification to European competitions.

== Results ==
Home \ Away	ARK	DNI	DYN	KAR	KRY	MET	MDO	MTM	MZA	POL	SHA	TAV	VOR	ZAK
Arsenal Kyiv	—	0–1	0–1	0–0	3–0	1–1	0–1	3–2	2–0	2–0	0–0	0–0	0–0	0–2
Dnipro	2–0	—	0–0	0–1	2–0	0–1	2–0	3–1	0–0	0–0	0–1	2–1	2–0	2–0
Dynamo Kyiv	2–0	1–0	—	4–1	0–0	6–0	2–0	1–0	1–0	5–0	2–2	0–0	1–0	5–0
Karpaty Lviv	1–0	0–0	0–2	—	3–2	0–2	0–1	2–0	2–1	0–0	0–2	0–0	0–1	3–0
Kryvbas Kryvyi Rih	1–0	3–3	0–7	0–0	—	4–1	1–3	1–1	0–0	3–1	0–0	2–0	2–0	1–0
Metalist Kharkiv	2–1	3–0	0–1	0–0	0–0	—	3–1	2–2	2–1	1–0	1–1	4–1	2–0	4–0
Metalurh Donetsk	2–1	2–0	0–0	0–0	3–2	5–0	—	2–1	1–1	1–0	0–1	4–1	0–0	1–1
Metalurh Mariupol	1–2	0–0	0–6	3–1	3–1	0–0	4–2	—	0–0	2–1	0–2	0–0	1–0	3–0
Metalurh Zaporizhzhia	2–0	2–1	1–3	4–1	0–0	1–0	0–3	3–0	—	0–0	0–3	0–2	1–0	4–1
Polihraftekhnika	1–0	2–6	0–3	1–1	0–0	2–0	1–0	2–2	0–1	—	1–2	0–1	2–2	4–2
Shakhtar Donetsk	2–0	1–0	2–0	3–0	3–1	3–0	3–1	2–0	0–0	2–1	—	2–1	4–0	5–1
Tavriya Simferopol	1–2	0–2	1–5	3–0	3–2	2–0	1–3	3–1	0–1	2–0	0–1	—	1–0	1–1
Vorskla Poltava	1–0	1–2	1–2	1–3	2–2	1–1	2–1	2–1	0–1	1–1	1–1	2–0	—	1–0
Zakarpattia Uzhhorod	2–1	0–0	1–2	1–0	2–0	3–5	1–1	1–1	0–1	0–1	0–1	2–2	2–0	—

Source: uafootball.net.ua
Legend: Blue = home team win; Yellow = draw; Red = away team win.

== Relegation playoff ==
June 16, 2002

Polihraftekhnika Oleksandriya	1 – 0	Polissia Zhytomyr
Babych 45+2'; Martynenko (yellow card) 30' (red card) 78'	Report

CSK ZSU Stadium, Kyiv
Attendance: 5,000
Referee: Shebek (Kyiv)

== Top goalscorers ==
(Ukraine) Serhiy Shyshchenko	Metalurh Donetsk	12 (2)
(Ukraine) Vitaliy Pushkutsa	Metalist Kharkiv	11 (1)
(Ukraine) Oleksandr Melashchenko	Dynamo Kyiv	9
(Ukraine) Andriy Vorobey	Shakhtar Donetsk	9
(Belarus) Valyantsin Byalkevich	Dynamo Kyiv	9(1)
(Romania) Florin Cernat	Dynamo Kyiv	9 (1)
(Georgia (country)) Vasil Gigiadze	Tavriya Simferopol	9 (7)
(Ukraine) Ihor Prodan	Zakarpattia Uzhhorod	8
(Ukraine) Serhiy Chuychenko	Polihraftekhnika Oleksandriya	8(3)
(Ukraine) Hennady Zubov	Shakhtar Donetsk	8 (4)

== Attendances ==
#	Football club	Average attendance
1	Shakhtar Donetsk	25,615
2	Kryvbas	17,308
3	Metalist	15,423
4	Dnipro	12,492
5	Karpaty	10,438
6	Illichivets	9,477
7	Dynamo Kyiv	8,300
8	Vorskla	6,623
9	Metalurh Zaporizhzhya	5,946
10	Goverla	5,400
11	Arsenal Kyiv	5,338
12	Polihraftekhnika	5,015
13	Tavriya	4,985
14	Metalurh Donetsk	3,615

== See also ==
- 2001–02 Ukrainian First League
- 2001–02 Ukrainian Second League
- 2001–02 Ukrainian Cup
