= Mykhaylo Starostyak =

Ukrainian footballer

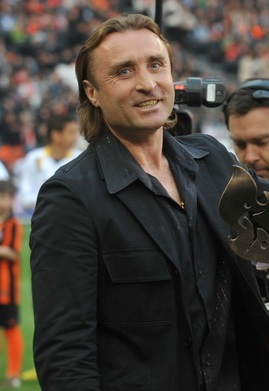

Personal information
- Full name: Mykhaylo Volodymyrovych Starostyak
- Date of birth: 13 October 1973 (age 53)
- Place of birth: Hrusiatychi, Lviv Oblast, Soviet Union (now Ukraine)
- Height: 1.80 m (5 ft 11 in)
- Position: Defender

Team information
- Current team: Nyva Vinnytsia (assistant)

Youth career
- 1990–1992: Ivano-Frankivsk Sports Technical School

Senior career*
Years	Team	Apps	(Gls)
1992–1993	Sokil Berezhany	29	(0)
1993–1995	Prykarpattia Ivano-Frankivsk	97	(0)
1995–2004	Shakhtar Donetsk	244	(1)
1995–2001	→ Shakhtar-2 Donetsk	13	(0)
2003	→ Shakhtar-3 Donetsk	1	(0)
2004–2006	Shinnik Yaroslavl	42	(0)
2006–2007	Kryvbas Kryvyi Rih	10	(0)
2007–2009	Simurq	67	(0)
Total		502	(1)

International career^{‡}
1997–2004	Ukraine	17	(0)

Managerial career
- 2015–2016: Illichivets Mariupol (assistant)
- 2019–2021: Shakhtar Donetsk (U19) (assistant)
- 2021–2022: Mynai (assistant)
- 2022–: Nyva Vinnytsia (assistant)
- * Club domestic league appearances and goals as of 1 August 2008 ‡ National team caps and goals as of 1 August 2008

Mykhaylo Volodymyrovych Starostyak (Ukrainian: Михайло Старостяк, born 13 October 1973) is a Ukrainian former football player. He started off as a right back, but mostly played as a center back.

== Player's career ==
He started playing football as a member of a children's team from his native village. After completing the 9th grade at school, he moved to Ivano-Frankivsk, where he entered the local college of physical education, majoring in football. Since 1992, he played in the Transitional League of the Ukrainian Championship as a member of the Sokil team (Berezhany). At the beginning of the 1993–1994 season, he joined the Ivano-Frankivsk-based Prykarpattia, and two years later, Shakhtar Donetsk. He made his debut in the Ukrainian Premier League on July 29, 1995, in a game against IFC Mykolaiv (0–0 draw).

After playing nine seasons at Shakhtar, he moved to Russia, where he defended the colors of Shinnik Yaroslavl. In 2006, he returned to Ukraine and played 10 matches for Kryvbas Kryvyi Rih. He ended his football career with performances in the top division of the Azerbaijani championship, where he played in 2007–2009 as part of the Simurgh team.

== Appearances for the national team ==
He made his debut for the national team of Ukraine on March 23, 1997, in a game against the national team of Moldova (victory 1: 0). In total, over 7 years (from 1997 to 2004), he appeared in 17 matches for the national team.
