= Volodymyr Atamanyuk =

Soviet footballer and Ukrainian football coach

Personal information
- Full name: Volodymyr Mykolayovych Atamanyuk
- Date of birth: 13 June 1955 (age 71)
- Place of birth: Stalino, Ukrainian SSR, Soviet Union
- Position: Defender

Youth career
- 1964–1972: Shakhtar Donetsk

Senior career*
Years	Team	Apps	(Gls)
1973–1975	SKA Kyiv		
1976–1977	Novator Zhdanov	62	(13)
1978–1980	Metalurh Zaporizhzhia	24	(2)
1980	Metalurh Dniprodzerzhynsk	33	(8)
1981	Metalurh Zaporizhzhia	1	(0)
1982	Novator Zhdanov	8	(1)
1987	Novator Zhdanov	2	(1)

Managerial career
- 1989–1993: Torpedo Zaporizhzhia (assistant)
- 1998: Nyva Vinnytsia
- 2001: Metalurh Zaporizhzhia
- * Club domestic league appearances and goals

Volodymyr Mykolayovych Atamanyuk (Ukrainian: Володимир Миколайович Атаманюк, born 13 June 1955) is a retired former Soviet football player and a Ukrainian coach.
