= Serhiy Bilozor =

Ukrainian footballer

Personal information
- Full name: Serhiy Volodymyrovych Bilozor
- Date of birth: 15 July 1979 (age 47)
- Place of birth: Sumy, Ukrainian SSR
- Height: 1.85 m (6 ft 1 in)
- Position: Defender

Senior career*
Years	Team	Apps	(Gls)
1995–1996	Ahrotekhservis Sumy	6	(1)
1996–2000	Cherkasy	111	(9)
2000–2002	CSKA / Arsenal Kyiv	61	(1)
2000–2001	→ CSKA-2 / CSKA Kyiv	2	(0)
2003–2007	Chornomorets Odesa	115	(4)
2007–2010	Metalurh Donetsk	25	(1)
2010–2011	Dnister Ovidiopol	27	(1)
2011–2012	Odesa	28	(0)
- * Club domestic league appearances and goals as of 8 May 2013

Serhiy Volodymyrovych Bilozor (Ukrainian: Сергій Володимирович Білозор, romanized: Serhii Volodymyrovych Bilozor; born 15 July 1979) is a Ukrainian retired professional football defender.

== Career ==
=== Metalurh Donetsk ===
On 20 September 2008 he played with FC Metalurh Donetsk in his 200th official match in the Ukrainian Premier League.
