= Andriy Konyushenko =

Ukrainian footballer

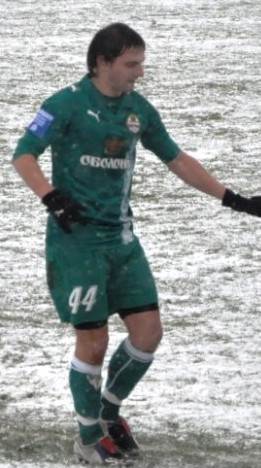

Personal information
- Full name: Andriy Vіktorovich Konyushenko
- Date of birth: 2 April 1977 (age 49)
- Place of birth: Kyiv, Ukrainian SSR, Soviet Union
- Height: 1.77 m (5 ft 9 1/2 in)
- Position: Defender

Senior career*
Years	Team	Apps	(Gls)
1996	Nyva-Kosmos Myronivka	14	(0)
1996–1997	Obolon Kyiv	38	(5)
1997–2000	Metalurh Zaporizhzhia	63	(7)
1998–2000	→ Metalurh-2 Zaporizhzhia	5	(0)
2000	→ SSSOR-Metalurh Zaporizhzhia	1	(0)
2001–2003	Shakhtar Donetsk	26	(1)
2001–2002	→ Shakhtar-2 Donetsk	23	(1)
2003	→ Volyn Lutsk (loan)	11	(0)
2003–2007	Illichivets Mariupol	79	(14)
2004	→ Illichivets-2 Mariupol	1	(0)
2005	→ Obolon Kyiv (loan)	10	(2)
2007–2008	Zorya Luhansk	20	(2)
2008–2009	Metalist Kharkiv	15	(1)
2009–2013	Obolon Kyiv	35	(2)
2013	Poltava	6	(0)
- * Club domestic league appearances and goals

Andriy Konyushenko (born 2 April 1977) is a Ukrainian former professional football defender. He was acquired from Zorya Luhansk during the 2008–09 summer transfer season.
