= Ihor Yarmenchuk =

Ukrainian football referee

- Full name: Ihor Anatoliyovych Yarmenchuk
- Born: 10 June 1957 (age 69); Chernivtsi, Ukrainian SSR

Domestic
Years	League	Role
1988-1991	Soviet Top League	Referee
1992-2005	Ukrainian Premier League	Referee

International
Years	League	Role
1998	FIFA listed	Referee

Ihor Anatoliyovych Yarmenchuk (Ukrainian: Ігор Анатолійович Ярменчук; born 10 June 1957) is a former Ukrainian association football referee.

In domestic competitions he represented Kyiv. Yarmenchuk started his football referee as an assistant referee in 1988 serving games of the Soviet Second League, Zone 6 (also same as Ukrainian championship) at the game Bukovyna Chernivtsi – Nyva Vinnytsia.

He was a referee at the 2002 FIFA World Cup qualification match between Andorra and Cyprus that took place on 2 September 2000 in Andorra la Vella, Andorra.
