= Vasyl Melnychuk =

Soviet–Ukrainian football referee

- Full name: Vasyl Hryhorovych Melnychuk
- Born: 18 February 1957 (age 69); Proletarske, Stalino Oblast, Ukrainian SSR

Domestic
| Years | League | Role |
| 1976–1991 | Soviet Top League | Referee |
| 1992–2005 | Ukrainian Premier League | Referee |

International
| Years | League | Role |
| 1993–2002 | FIFA listed | Referee |

Vasyl Hryhorovych Melnychuk (Ukrainian: Василь Григорович Мельничук; born 18 February 1957) is a former Soviet–Ukrainian football referee. He is the head of the committee of referees of the Ukraine Association of Football. Melnychuk is one of the top referees of the Ukrainian Premier League. He also officiated at international matches.

In 1979, Melnychuk graduated from the Odesa Engineer-Construction Institute.

== Key games ==
- 1999 Ukrainian Cup Final
- 2001 Ukrainian Cup Final
- 2002 Ukrainian Cup Final
