= Stepan Molokutsko =

Ukrainian footballer

Personal information
- Date of birth: 18 August 1979
- Place of birth: Mariupol, Soviet Union (now Ukraine)
- Date of death: 5 October 2002 (aged 23)
- Place of death: Novotroitske, Ukraine
- Height: 1.81 m (5 ft 11 in)
- Position: Forward

Senior career*
Years	Team	Apps	(Gls)
1997–2002	Illichivets Mariupol	108	(23)
1998	→ Shakhtar Makiivka (loan)	7	(0)
2000–2001	→ Illichivets-2 Mariupol	5	(2)

International career
2000–2002	Ukraine U21	10	(3)
- * Club domestic league appearances and goals

Stepan Molokutsko (18 August 1979 – 5 October 2002) was a Ukrainian footballer who played for Illichivets Mariupol.

== Death ==
He died in a road accident on 5 October 2002 near Novotroitske while driving on the way to Mariupol.
