= Hennadiy Zubov =

Ukrainian footballer (born 1977)

Personal information
- Full name: Hennadiy Oleksandrovych Zubov
- Date of birth: 12 September 1977 (age 49)
- Place of birth: Komunarsk, Ukrainian SSR, Soviet Union
- Height: 1.62 m (5 ft 4 in)
- Position: Right midfielder

Team information
- Current team: Pobeda Nizhny Novgorod (head coach)

Senior career*
Years	Team	Apps	(Gls)
1993–1994	Stal Alchevsk	27	(3)
1994–2004	Shakhtar Donetsk	223	(57)
1995–2004	→ Shakhtar-2 Donetsk	17	(3)
2003	→ Shakhtar-3 Donetsk	2	(0)
2004–2005	Illichivets Mariupol	14	(4)
2005	Metalurh Donetsk	0	(0)
2006	Stal Alchevsk	5	(0)
2006–2007	Zorya Luhansk	11	(2)
2007	Komunalnyk Luhansk	8	(0)
Total		307	(66)

International career
1996–2003	Ukraine	29	(3)

Managerial career
- 2019–2021: Shakhtar Donetsk (U21 assistant)
- 2023–2024: Zvezda St. Petersburg (assistant)
- 2024–2025: Spartak-2 Moscow (assistant)
- 2025–2026: Chayka Peschanokopskoye (assistant)
- 2026–: Pobeda Nizhny Novgorod
Medal record
Men's football
Representing Ukraine
UEFA European Under-16 Championship
Third place	1994 Republic of Ireland
- * Club domestic league appearances and goals

Hennadiy Oleksandrovych Zubov (Ukrainian: Геннадій Олександрович Зубов; born 12 September 1977) is a Ukrainian professional football coach and a former right midfielder. He made 29 appearances for the Ukraine national team scoring three goals. He is the head coach of Russian club Pobeda Nizhny Novgorod.

== Career ==
Zubov, a short midfielder (only 162 cm), is most-known for his playing days at Shakhtar Donetsk (1994–2004), as he was one of the few reliable midfielders that helped Shakhtar become one of the two football powerhouses in Ukraine. During his career, Zubov amassed 29 international caps representing Ukraine, while scoring 3 goals.

Zubov played several games for Ukrainian First League side Stal Alchevsk in 2006 and for Komunalnyk Luhansk in the Ukrainian Second League 2007 season and was released in October 2007 and subsequently retired. His career achievements saw him inducted into the Viktor Leonenko Hall of Fame in March 2012.

== Career statistics ==
=== Club ===
Appearances and goals by club, season and competition
Club	Season	League		Cup		Europe		Total	
Club	Season	Apps	Goals	Apps	Goals	Apps	Goals	Apps	Goals
Stal Alchevsk	1993–94	15	1	1	0	–		16	1
Stal Alchevsk	1994–95	12	2	2	0	–		14	2
Shakhtar Donetsk	1994–95	7	1	3	1	–		10	2
Shakhtar Donetsk	1995–96	25	6	4	1	1	0	30	7
Shakhtar Donetsk	1996–97	27	4	7	0	4	0	38	4
Shakhtar Donetsk	1997–98	30	7	4	2	6	2	40	11
Shakhtar Donetsk	1998–99	27	4	6	2	4	0	37	6
Shakhtar Donetsk	1999–00	26	12	3	2	3	0	32	14
Shakhtar Donetsk	2000–01	24	9	5	0	12	3	41	12
Shakhtar Donetsk	2001–02	23	8	6	0	6	1	35	9
Shakhtar Donetsk	2002–03	17	4	5	2	3	0	25	6
Shakhtar Donetsk	2003–04	17	2	5	0	1	0	23	2
Shakhtar Donetsk	Total	223	57	48	10	40	6	311	73
Illichivets	2004–05	14	4	2	1	3	0	19	5
Metalurh Donetsk	2005–06	0	0	1	0	–		1	0
Stal Alchevsk	2005–06	5	0	1	0	–		6	0
Zorya Luhansk	2006–07	11	2	1	0	–		12	2
Komunalnyk Luhansk	2007–08	8	0	1	0	–		9	0
Career total		288	66	57	11	43	6	388	83
