= Serhiy Popov =

Former Ukrainian footballer

Personal information
- Full name: Serhiy Oleksandrovych Popov
- Date of birth: 22 April 1971 (age 55)
- Place of birth: Makiivka, Ukrainian SSR
- Height: 1.80 m (5 ft 11 in)
- Position: Defender

Senior career*
Years	Team	Apps	(Gls)
1989	Novator Mariupol	21	(0)
1990–1991	SKA Kyiv	36	(2)
1991	Nyva Vinnytsia	24	(7)
1992–1996	Shakhtar Donetsk	96	(12)
1996–1997	Zenit Saint Petersburg	38	(2)
1996	→ Zenit-d Saint Petersburg	7	(0)
1997–2004	Shakhtar Donetsk	142	(28)
1998–2004	→ Shakhtar-2 Donetsk	6	(0)
2004–2006	Metalurh Zaporizhzhia	31	(2)
Total		401	(53)

International career
1993–2003	Ukraine	54	(5)

Managerial career
- 2007–2008: Shakhtar Donetsk (U19)
- 2008–2013: Shakhtar Donetsk (U21)
- 2015–2016: Metalist Kharkiv (assistant)
- 2015–2016: Ukraine U16
- 2016–2017: Ukraine U17
- 2017–2018: Ukraine U18
- 2019–2022: Zorya Luhansk (assistant)
- 2022–2023: Vorskla Poltava (assistant)
- 2023–: Vorskla Poltava (interim)
- * Club domestic league appearances and goals

Serhiy Oleksandrovych Popov (Ukrainian: Сергій Олександрович Попов; born 22 April 1971) is a Ukrainian football manager and former footballer. He is the highest scoring defender of the Ukraine national football team.

== Career ==
Popov is a graduate of the Donetsk sports school of Olympic reserve and started to compete at senior level at age of 17 playing for the Novator Mariupol (Zhdanov). After being drafted to the army, he defended colors of SKA Kiev and FC Nyva Vinnytsia in 1990–91.

After the fall of the Soviet Union Popov signed with Shakhtar Donetsk of the Ukrainian Premier League, with which he stayed until 2004. In the mid 90s he also spend couple of seasons for the Russian Zenit Saint Petersburg. Before retiring in 2006 Popov played for Metalurh Zaporizhia.

== International career ==
The hard-nosed defender was also a regular member of the Ukraine national football team from 1993 to 2003, having appeared in 54 international matches and notching 5 goals.

== Career statistics ==
=== International goals ===
No.	Date	Venue	Opponent	Score	Result	Competition
1	23 October 1993	Goodman Stadium, Bethlehem, United States	United States	1–0	1–0	Friendly match
2	5 October 1996	Olimpiyskyi National Sports Complex, Kyiv, Ukraine	Portugal	1–0	2–1	1998 FIFA World Cup qualification
3	5 June 1999	Olimpiyskyi National Sports Complex, Kyiv, Ukraine	Andorra	1–0	4–0	UEFA Euro 2000 qualifying
