= FC Shakhtar-2 Donetsk =

Ukrainian Football Team

FC Shakhtar-2 Donetsk was a Ukrainian reserve football team based in Donetsk, Ukraine.

== History ==
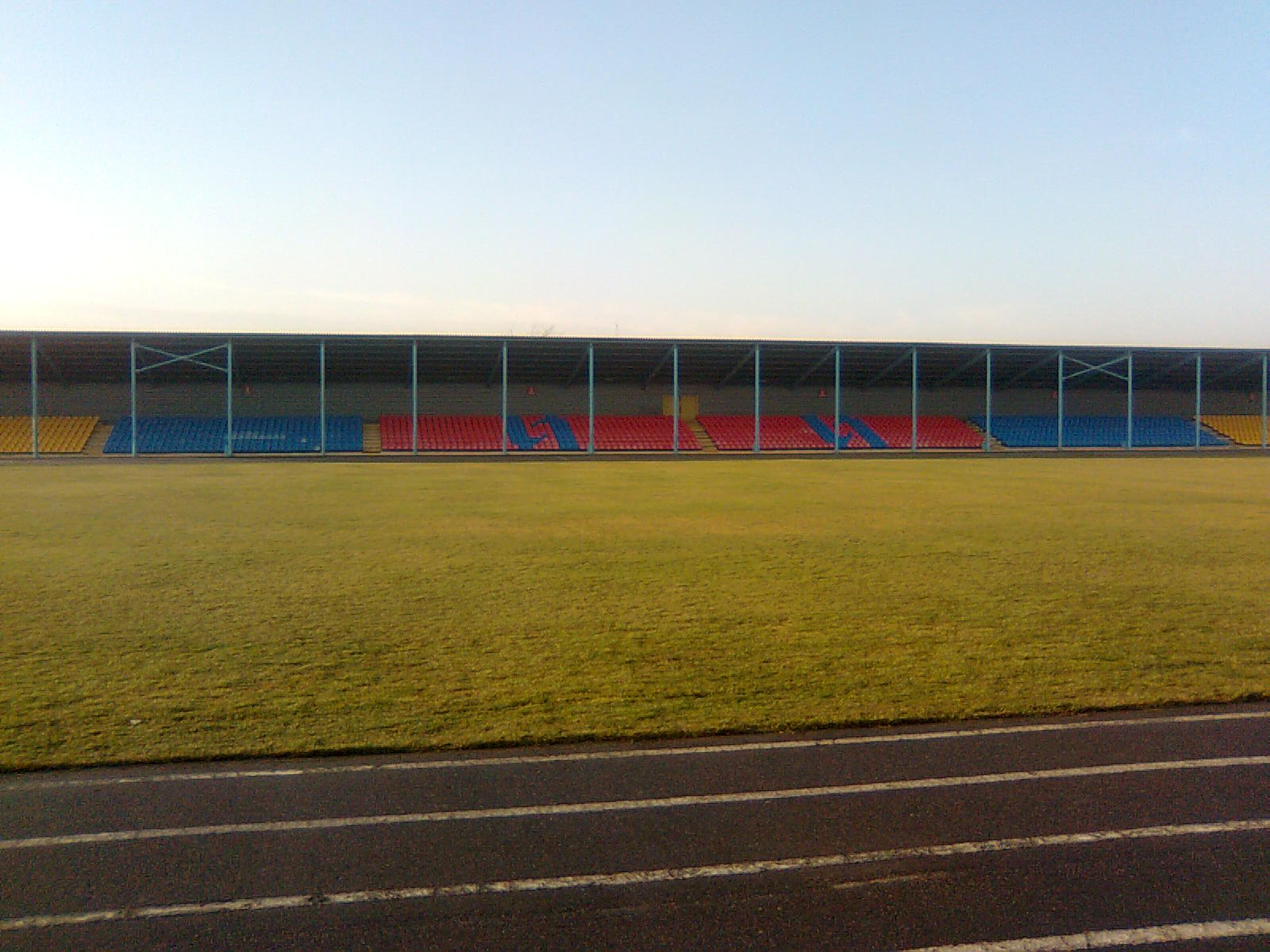
Metalurh Stadium in Kalmiuske (formerly Komsomolske)

The club was formed in 1992. It was preceded by Shakhter-D Donetsk (where D stood for double) which since 1949 participated in the Soviet football championship for reserve teams. With the fall of the Soviet Union the team was preserved, reorganized as Shkhtar-2 Donetsk and was admitted to the 1992 Ukrainian First League. Until 1994 the team represented the city of Kostiantynivka and in 1992–1994 played under the name of Metalurh Kostiantynivka. The team played at Avtosklo Stadium.

In 1994–95 the team carried name of Garant Donetsk, but later changed back to Shakhtar-2. The team represented the city of Komsomolske, Donetsk Oblast playing at Metalurh Stadium.

In 1995–96 the team played at Shakhtar Stadium in Donetsk and at another Shakhtar Stadium in Makiivka. Next season 1996-97 the team played at Avanhard Stadium in Makiivka.

The club served as a training spot for young prospects, but under the management of new Shakhtar youth coaches, the club did not register to play in the Persha Liha for the 2006–07 season, and many of its regulars were cut.

== Honours ==
- (Ukraine) Ukrainian Second League - Group C
  - Winners (1): 1997/98

== League and cup history ==
Season	Div.	Pos.	Pl.	W	D	L	GS	GA	P	Domestic Cup	Other	Notes
1992	2nd "B" (First League)	12	26	5	2	19	25	48	12	DNP		Relegated
1992–93	3rd (Second League)	11	34	10	12	12	33	30	32	1/16 finals		
1993	3rd (Second League)	Metalurh Kostiantynivka										
1993–94	3rd (Second League)	17	42	13	9	20	41	58	35	1/16 finals		
1994	3rd (Second League)	Garant Donetsk / Shakhtar-2										
1994–95	3rd (Second League)	20	42	10	7	25	37	71	37	1/256 finals		pts count change
1995–96	3rd "B" (Second League)	9	38	18	7	13	44	32	61	1/16 finals		
1996–97	3rd "B" (Second League)	9	32	10	11	11	43	39	41	1/64 finals		
1997–98	3rd "C" (Second League)	1	34	25	3	6	69	20	78	1/16 finals		Promotion playoffs
1997–98	3rd "C" (Second League)	3	3	1	0	1	1	4	3	1/16 finals		Promoted
1998–99	2nd (First League)	10	38	15	7	16	51	44	52			
1999–2000	2nd (First League)	4	34	16	8	10	47	38	56			
2000–01	2nd (First League)	13	34	13	4	17	31	39	43			
2001–02	2nd (First League)	11	34	13	7	14	50	46	46			
2002–03	2nd (First League)	12	34	11	9	14	33	40	42			
2003–04	2nd (First League)	10	34	12	8	14	43	43	44			
2004–05	2nd (First League)	11	34	13	5	16	45	53	44			
2005–06	2nd (First League)	11	34	12	8	14	37	42	44			Withdrew

== Coaches ==
- 1992–1994 Yevhen Korol (Metalurh Kostiantynivka)
- 1994–1996 Viktor Nosov
- 1996–1997 Viktor Hrachov
- 1997–2001 Yevhen Korol
- 2001–2002 Mykola Fedorenko
- 2002–2003 Viktor Hrachov
- 2003–2006 Mykola Fedorenko

== See also ==
- FC Shakhtar Donetsk
- FC Shakhtar Donetsk Reserves and Youth Team
