= 1997–98 Dynamo Kyiv season =

Dynamo Kyiv
1997–98 season
- President: Hryhoriy Surkis
- Manager: Valeriy Lobanovskyi
- Stadium: Dynamo Stadium; Olympic National Sports Complex (selected matches)
- Vyshcha Liha: Winners
- Ukrainian Cup: Winners
- UEFA Champions League: Quarter-finals
- Top goalscorer: League: Serhiy Rebrov (22); All: Serhiy Rebrov (37)
- Highest home attendance: 5,000 (Note: Highest and average home attendance figures are for games played at Dynamo Stadium.) (vs. Dnipro Dnipropetrovsk, 14 April 1998)
- Average home league attendance: 2,773
Home colours	Away colours

The 1997–98 season was Dynamo Kyiv's 67th competitive season, 7th season in the Vyshcha Liha, 70th year in existence as a football club and their 18th overall season coached by Valeriy Lobanovskyi. The club completed the "Double", winning the Vyshcha Liha for a sixth time and winning the Ukrainian Cup for a third time, whilst also reaching the quarter-finals of the UEFA Champions League.

== Kits ==
Supplier: Adidas / Sponsor: Prominvestbank

Home	Home alt.	Away	Away alt.	Goalkeeper

== Season summary ==
Dynamo Kyiv won the Vyshcha Liha and the Ukrainian Cup to complete the double for the seventh time in their history (third as part of Ukraine). Hopes of a continental treble were ultimately ended by eventual finalists Juventus in the quarter-finals of the UEFA Champions League.

== Squad ==
Squad during the season

Note: Flags indicate national team as defined under FIFA eligibility rules; some limited exceptions apply. Players may hold more than one non-FIFA nationality.

No.	Pos.	Nation	Player
1	GK	UKR	Oleksandr Shovkovskyi
2	DF	UKR	Oleh Luzhnyi (captain)
3	DF	UKR	Serhiy Bezhenar
4	DF	UKR	Oleksandr Holovko
5	DF	UKR	Vladyslav Vashchuk
6	DF	UKR	Yuriy Dmytrulin
7	DF	GEO	Kakha Kaladze
8	MF	BLR	Valyantsin Byalkevich
9	MF	UKR	Vitaliy Kosovskyi
10	FW	UKR	Andriy Shevchenko
11	FW	UKR	Serhiy Rebrov
12	GK	UKR	Vyacheslav Kernozenko
14	MF	UKR	Andriy Husin
15	MF	BLR	Alyaksandr Khatskevich
16	MF	UKR	Vitaliy Samoylov
18	DF	UKR	Vasyl Kardash
19	MF	UKR	Dmytro Mykhaylenko
20	DF	UKR	Serhiy Shmatovalenko

No.	Pos.	Nation	Player
21	FW	UKR	Viktor Leonenko
22	MF	UKR	Yuriy Maksymov
23	DF	UKR	Oleksandr Radchenko
25	DF	UKR	Mykola Volosyanko
26	DF	UKR	Serhiy Fedorov
27	FW	RUS	Aleksei Gerasimenko
—	DF	UKR	Volodymyr Kovalyuk
—	DF	UKR	Andriy Nesmachnyi
—	DF	UKR	Oleksandr Kyryukhin
—	MF	UKR	Tykhon Polyakov
—	MF	BLR	Mikhail Makovskiy
—	MF	UKR	Yuriy Kalitvintsev
—	FW	UKR	Oleh Venhlinskyi
—	FW	UKR	Pavlo Shkapenko
—	FW	UKR	Oleksandr Kosyrin
—	FW	BLR	Vladimir Makovskiy
—	FW	UKR	Dmytro Kozlenko

== Club ==
=== Coaching staff ===
Position	Staff
Head coach	(Ukraine) Valeriy Lobanovskyi
Assistant coaches	(Ukraine) Anatoliy Puzach
Assistant coaches	(Ukraine) Oleksiy Mykhaylychenko
Assistant coaches	(Ukraine) Anatoliy Demyanenko
Goalkeeping coach	(Ukraine) Mykhaylo Mykhaylov

=== Other information ===
Position	Staff
President	(Ukraine) Hryhoriy Surkis
Sporting advisor	(Ukraine) Volodymyr Veremeyev

== Transfers ==
=== In ===
Position	Player	From	Type	Fee	Date	Ref.
MF	(Belarus) Mikhail Makovskiy	(Belarus) Dinamo Minsk	Transfer	€116,500	1 July 1997	
FW	(Belarus) Vladimir Makovskiy	(Belarus) Dinamo Minsk	Transfer	€116,500	1 July 1997	
DF	(Ukraine) Oleksandr Radchenko	(Ukraine) Metalurh Mariupol	Transfer	Undisclosed	1 July 1997	
DF	(Georgia (country)) Kakha Kaladze	(Georgia (country)) Dinamo Tbilisi	Transfer	€280,000	1 January 1998	
FW	(Russia) Aleksei Gerasimenko	(Russia) Rostov	Transfer	Undisclosed	1 January 1998	

=== Out ===
Position	Player	To	Type	Fee	Date	Ref.
MF	(Ukraine) Ihor Kostyuk	(Ukraine) Vorskla Poltava	Transfer	Undisclosed	1 July 1997	
DF	(Ukraine) Serhiy Datsenko	(Ukraine) Metalurh Donetsk	Transfer	Undisclosed	1 July 1997	
MF	(Ukraine) Yuriy Maksymov	(Germany) Werder Bremen	Transfer	€750,000	28 November 1997	
MF	(Ukraine) Vitaliy Samoylov	(Ukraine) Vorskla Poltava	Transfer	Undisclosed	1 April 1998	

=== Loaned out ===
Position	Player	To	Type	Fee	Start	End	Ref.
FW	(Ukraine) Oleksiy Antyukhin	(Ukraine) Vorskla Poltava	Loan transfer		1 July 1997	30 June 1998	

== Competitions ==
Competition	First match	Last match	Starting round	Final position	Record							
Competition	First match	Last match	Starting round	Final position	Pld	W	D	L	GF	GA	GD	Win %
Vyshcha Liha	9 July 1997	18 June 1998	Matchday 1	Winners	30	23	3	4	70	15	+55	76.67
Ukrainian Cup	1 November 1997	31 May 1998	Round of 32	Winners	9	9	0	0	28	7	+21	100.00
UEFA Champions League	23 July 1997	18 March 1998	First qualifying round	Quarter-finals	12	6	3	3	25	14	+11	50.00
Total					51	38	6	7	123	36	+87	74.51

Source: Competitions

=== Vyshcha Liha ===
Pos	Team	Pld	W	D	L	GF	GA	GD	Pts	Qualification or relegation
1	Dynamo Kyiv (Note: Participants of the 1998 Ukrainian Cup Final) (C)	30	23	3	4	70	15	+55	72	Qualification to Champions League first qualifying round
2	Shakhtar Donetsk	30	20	7	3	61	25	+36	67	Qualification to UEFA Cup first qualifying round
3	Karpaty Lviv	30	16	9	5	36	20	+16	57	
4	Dnipro Dnipropetrovsk	30	17	4	9	47	27	+20	55	
5	Vorskla Poltava	30	15	4	11	41	46	−5	49	Qualification to Intertoto Cup first round

Source: uafootball.net.ua
(C) Champions

==== Results summary ====
Overall								Home						Away					
Pld	W	D	L	GF	GA	GD	Pts	W	D	L	GF	GA	GD	W	D	L	GF	GA	GD
30	23	3	4	70	15	+55	72	13	0	2	40	7	+33	10	3	2	30	8	+22

Source: Vyshcha Liha

==== Results by round ====
Round	1	2	3	4	5	6	7	8	9	10	11	12	13	14	15	16	17	18	19	20	21	22	23	24	25	26	27	28	29	30
Ground	A	A	H	A	H	A	H	A	H	H	A	H	A	H	A	H	A	H	A	H	A	A	H	A	H	A	H	A	H	H
Result	W	W	W	W	W	W	W	W	W	W	W	L	D	L	W	W	L	W	L	W	W	D	W	D	W	W	W	W	W	W
Position	3	3	2	2	1	1	1	1	1	1	1	1	1	1	1	1	1	1	1	2	2	1	1	1	1	1	1	1	1	1

Source: Vyshcha Liha
A = Away; H = Home; W = Win; D = Draw; L = Loss

==== Matches ====
Fixtures listed by date played; matchday numbers shown are the official league rounds.

9 July 1997 1	Torpedo Zaporizhzhia	0–3	Dynamo Kyiv	Zaporizhzhia
EEST (UTC+3)	Portnov (yellow card) 82'		Kardash 39'; Rebrov 62' (pen.), 66'; Holovko (yellow card) 89'	Stadium: AvtoZAZ Stadium; Attendance: 8,000; Referee: Igor Ishchenko

13 July 1997 2	Zirka Kirovohrad	1–3	Dynamo Kyiv	Kropyvnytskyi
EEST (UTC+3)	Martynov 39'; Moshevych (yellow card) 47'; Sechin (yellow card) 57'		Rebrov (yellow card) 59' (goal) 64'; Kalitvintsev 60', 76'	Stadium: Zirka-NIBAS Kirovohrad; Attendance: 6,500; Referee: Valeriy Onufer

18 July 1997 3	Dynamo Kyiv	3–0	Tavriya Simferopol	Kyiv
EEST (UTC+3)	Rebrov 12' (pen.); Shkapenko 17'; Dmytrulin 44'		Volkov (red card) 12'	Stadium: Dynamo Stadium; Attendance: 4,000; Referee: Yaroslav Grysyo

4 August 1997 5	Dynamo Kyiv	3–0	Metalurh Mariupol	Kyiv
EEST (UTC+3)	Shkapenko 28'; Maksymov 31'; Radchenko 78'			Stadium: Dynamo Stadium; Attendance: 1,300; Referee: Anatoliy Zhosan

8 August 1997 6	Vorskla Poltava	1–4	Dynamo Kyiv	Poltava
EEST (UTC+3)	Antyukhin 24'		Rebrov 27' (pen.), 75'; Shevchenko 50', 85'; Maksymov (yellow card) 68'	Stadium: Vorskla Stadium; Attendance: 19,000; Referee: Konstantin Panchik

1 September 1997 9	Dynamo Kyiv	3–0	Shakhtar Donetsk	Kyiv
EEST (UTC+3)	Shevchenko 18', 44'; Luzhnyi (yellow card) 29'; Rebrov 85'		Zhabchenko (yellow card) 10'; Koval (yellow card) 12'	Stadium: Dynamo Stadium; Attendance: 3,000; Referee: Igor Khiblin

5 September 1997 4	Kryvbas Kryvyi Rih	0–1	Dynamo Kyiv	Kryvyi Rih
EEST (UTC+3)	Yudin (yellow card) 39'; Diryavka (yellow card) 85'		Shevchenko 6'; Vashchuk (yellow card) 48'	Stadium: Metalurh Stadium; Attendance: 17,000; Referee: Konstantin Panchik

9 September 1997 10	Dynamo Kyiv	4–0	Prykarpattya Ivano-Frankivsk	Kyiv
EEST (UTC+3)	Vashchuk 16'; Shevchenko 52'; Rebrov 55'; Kalitvintsev 69'			Stadium: Dynamo Stadium; Attendance: 1,500; Referee: Valeriy Avdysh

21 September 1997 12	Dynamo Kyiv	0–1	Metalurh Donetsk	Kyiv
EEST (UTC+3)			Solodkyi 82'	Stadium: Dynamo Stadium; Attendance: 2,000; Referee: Igor Ishchenko

26 September 1997 13	Chornomorets Odesa	1–1	Dynamo Kyiv	Odesa
EEST (UTC+3)	Pogorelov 42'		Khatskevich (yellow card) 44' (goal) 59'; Mykhaylenko (yellow card) 90'	Stadium: Central Stadium ChMP; Attendance: 10,000; Referee: Igor Khiblin

5 October 1997 14	Dynamo Kyiv	0–1	Karpaty Lviv	Kyiv
EEST (UTC+3)	Shevchenko (yellow card) 40'; Kalitvintsev (yellow card) 80'		Nazarov 1'; Tolochko (yellow card) 11'	Stadium: Dynamo Stadium; Attendance: 600; Referee: Valeriy Avdysh

17 October 1997 15	CSKA Kyiv	0–1	Dynamo Kyiv	Kyiv
EEST (UTC+3)	Ulyanitsky (yellow card) 36'		Holovko 31'; Khatskevich (yellow card) 34'	Stadium: SKA Stadium; Attendance: 3,000; Referee: Konstantin Panchik

9 November 1997 7	Dynamo Kyiv	4–2	Nyva Ternopil	Kyiv
EET (UTC+2)	Byalkevich 9'; Maksymov 19', 25'; Rebrov 60'		Biskup 52'; Kapanadze 72'	Stadium: Dynamo Stadium; Attendance: 2,000; Referee: Volodymyr Kutsev

20 November 1997 8	Metalurh Zaporizhzhia	1–5	Dynamo Kyiv	Zaporizhzhia
EET (UTC+2)	Ilchenko (yellow card) 50'; Ratiy 82'		Maksymov 43', 70'; Rebrov 59'; Shevchenko 64', 78'; Holovko (yellow card) 81'	Stadium: Central Stadium Metalurh; Attendance: 7,000; Referee: Viktor Derdo

1 December 1997 11	Dnipro Dnipropetrovsk	0–2	Dynamo Kyiv	Dnipro
EET (UTC+2)	Mizin (yellow card) 4'; Palyanytsya (yellow card) 14'; Kalynychenko (yellow card) 74'		Rebrov 47'; Shevchenko 83'	Stadium: Meteor Stadium; Attendance: 2,500; Referee: Volodymyr Pianykh

22 March 1998 17	Karpaty Lviv	2–1	Dynamo Kyiv	Lviv
EET (UTC+2)	Benyo 7'; Polunin (yellow card) 30'; Getsko (yellow card) 52' (goal) 60'		Husin (yellow card) 35' (goal) 87'	Stadium: Ukraina Stadium; Attendance: 40,000; Referee: Vasyl Melnychuk

26 March 1998 18	Dynamo Kyiv	1–0	Chornomorets Odesa	Kyiv
EET (UTC+2)	Luzhnyi (yellow card) 26'; Rebrov 55'; Venhlinskyi (yellow card) 58'; Kyryukhin (yellow card) 78'		Zotov (yellow card) 43'; Pets (yellow card) 81'	Stadium: Dynamo Stadium; Attendance: 3,200; Referee: Anatoliy Zhosan

14 April 1998 20	Dynamo Kyiv	2–1	Dnipro Dnipropetrovsk	Kyiv
EEST (UTC+3)	Shevchenko 31', 47'		Telyatnykov 7'; Poklonskyi (yellow card) 17' (yellow-red card) 66'; Sidelnikov (yellow card) 19'; Pavlyukh (yellow card) 37'	Stadium: Dynamo Stadium; Attendance: 5,000; Referee: Volodymyr Pianykh

20 April 1998 21	Prykarpattya Ivano-Frankivsk	0–3	Dynamo Kyiv	Ivano-Frankivsk
EEST (UTC+3)	Larin (yellow card) 28'		Kalitvintsev 4'; Makovskiy 77', 84'; Gerasimenko (yellow card) 87'	Stadium: MCS Rukh; Attendance: 13,000; Referee: Igor Ishchenko

28 April 1998 22	Shakhtar Donetsk	0–0	Dynamo Kyiv	Donetsk
EEST (UTC+3)	Orbu (yellow card) 65'		Makovskiy (yellow card) 25'	Stadium: Central Stadium (Shakhtar); Attendance: 35,000; Referee: Konstantin Panchik

2 May 1998 23	Dynamo Kyiv	2–1	Metalurh Zaporizhzhia	Kyiv
EEST (UTC+3)	Rebrov 59', 73'		Poltavets 21'; Ratiy (yellow card) 39'; Klyuchyk (yellow card) 83'	Stadium: Dynamo Stadium; Attendance: 4,000; Referee: Viktor Derdo

10 May 1998 24	Nyva Ternopil	1–1	Dynamo Kyiv	Ternopil
EEST (UTC+3)	Shpak 50'; Pervak (yellow card) 57'; Fokin (yellow card) 65'		Gerasimenko 43'; Shevchenko (yellow card) 58'	Stadium: Avanhard Stadium; Attendance: 16,000; Referee: Vasyl Melnychuk

18 May 1998 25	Dynamo Kyiv	5–0	Vorskla Poltava	Kyiv
EEST (UTC+3)	Gerasimenko (yellow card) 12'; Rebrov 50' (pen.), 71'; Kaladze 66'; Shevchenko 75'; Kalitvintsev 86'		Kobzar (yellow card) 15'; Machogan (yellow card) 27'; Golovko (yellow card) 40'; Kovtun (yellow card) 59'	Stadium: Dynamo Stadium; Attendance: 5,000; Referee: Igor Ishchenko

22 May 1998 16	Dynamo Kyiv	4–0	CSKA Kyiv	Kyiv
EEST (UTC+3)	Kyryukhin 36'; Shevchenko 44', 63', 90' (pen.)		Tsykhmeystruk (yellow card) 83'	Stadium: Dynamo Stadium; Attendance: 5,000; Referee: Igor Khiblin

26 May 1998 26	Metalurh Mariupol	0–2	Dynamo Kyiv	Mariupol
EEST (UTC+3)			Husin 4'; Rebrov 34'; Kovalyuk (yellow card) 74'	Stadium: Stadion Azovstal; Attendance: 14,000; Referee: Valeriy Onufer

4 June 1998 27	Dynamo Kyiv	2–0	Kryvbas Kryvyi Rih	Kyiv
EEST (UTC+3)	Shevchenko 42', 62'		Hranovskyi (yellow card) 15'; Tolkach (yellow card) 17'; Moroz (red card) 76'	Stadium: Dynamo Stadium; Attendance: 2,000; Referee: Vasyl Melnychuk

8 June 1998 28	Tavriya Simferopol	0–3	Dynamo Kyiv	Simferopol
EEST (UTC+3)	Esin (red card) 27'; Demyanenko (yellow card) 77'		Rebrov 27' (pen.), 42', 85'	Stadium: Lokomotiv Stadium; Attendance: 16,000; Referee: Vitaliy Hodulian

12 June 1998 29	Dynamo Kyiv	4–1	Zirka Kirovohrad	Kyiv
EEST (UTC+3)	Kaladze 24' (yellow card) 67'; Kosovskyi 31'; Shevchenko 38', 47'; Kalitvintsev (yellow card) 71'		Khomenko (yellow card) 40'; Martynov 69'	Stadium: Dynamo Stadium; Attendance: 2,000; Referee: Volodymyr Kutsev

16 June 1998 30	Dynamo Kyiv	3–0	Torpedo Zaporizhzhia	Kyiv
EEST (UTC+3)	Makovskiy 18'; Rebrov 33', 76'			Stadium: Dynamo Stadium; Attendance: 1,000; Referee: Viktor Derdo

18 June 1998 19	Metalurh Donetsk	1–0	Dynamo Kyiv	Donetsk
EEST (UTC+3)	Sevidov 42'; Virt (yellow card) 89'		Makovskiy (yellow card) 28'; Khatskevich (yellow card) 44'	Stadium: Metalurh Stadium (Donetsk); Attendance: 2,500; Referee: Viktor Derdo

=== Ukrainian Cup ===
==== Round of 32 ====
1 November 1997 First leg	Dynamo-3 Kyiv	0–5	Dynamo Kyiv	Kyiv
EET (UTC+2)			Shevchenko 5', 70'; Kalitvintsev 9', 83'; Byalkevich 72'	Stadium: NTB Koncha-Zaspa; Attendance: 30; Referee: Igor Yarmenchuk

11 November 1997 Second leg	Dynamo Kyiv	5–3 (10–3 agg.)	Dynamo-3 Kyiv	Kyiv
EET (UTC+2)	Leonenko 54', 59', 80', 81'; Kozlenko 67'		Sosnovschi 26'; Yesyp 75'; Sukhomlynov 78'	Stadium: Dynamo Stadium; Attendance: 100; Referee: Anatoliy Aranovskiy

==== Round of 16 ====
11 March 1998 First leg	Dynamo Kyiv	3–0	Metalurh Mariupol	Kyiv
EET (UTC+2)	Rebrov 16' (pen.); Khatskevich (yellow card) 44'; Shevchenko 68'; Kosovskyi 86'		Bukel (yellow card) 28'	Stadium: Dynamo Stadium; Attendance: 2,000; Referee: Vasyl Babych

1 April 1998 Second leg	Metalurh Mariupol	0–1 (0–4 agg.)	Dynamo Kyiv	Mariupol
EEST (UTC+3)			Rebrov 73'; Gerasimenko (yellow card) 79'	Stadium: Stadion Azovstal; Attendance: 12,000; Referee: Igor Ishchenko

==== Quarter-finals ====
10 April 1998 First leg	Dynamo Kyiv	3–0	Chornomorets Odesa	Kyiv
EEST (UTC+3)	Shevchenko 13' (yellow card) 32'; Gerasimenko 40'; Kalitvintsev (yellow card) 68'; Rebrov 72'		Zotov (yellow card) 51'; Kolesnichenko (yellow card) 66'	Stadium: Dynamo Stadium; Attendance: 7,000; Referee: Vasyl Melnychuk

24 April 1998 Second leg	Chornomorets Odesa	1–4 (1–7 agg.)	Dynamo Kyiv	Odesa
EEST (UTC+3)	Skoropad 37'		Shevchenko 24'; Rebrov 35', 52' (pen.); Gerasimenko 50'	Stadium: Central Stadium ChMP; Attendance: 6,000; Referee: Anatoliy Zhosan

==== Semi-finals ====
6 May 1998 First leg	Kryvbas Kryvyi Rih	2–4	Dynamo Kyiv	Kryvyi Rih
EEST (UTC+3)	Shyshchenko 28'; Annenkov (yellow card) 33'; Hranovskyi (yellow card) 36'; Rymshyn 85'		Kaladze 21'; Rebrov 50'; Shevchenko 70'; Husin 82'	Stadium: Metalurh Stadium; Attendance: 36,000; Referee: Vasyl Babych

14 May 1998 Second leg	Dynamo Kyiv	1–0 (5–2 agg.)	Chornomorets Odesa	Kyiv
EEST (UTC+3)	Rebrov 41'		Hranovskyi (yellow card) 31'	Stadium: Dynamo Stadium; Attendance: 4,000; Referee: Anatoliy Zhosan

==== Final ====
31 May 1998 Final	Dynamo Kyiv	2–1	CSKA Kyiv	Kyiv
EEST (UTC+3)	Shevchenko 1', 33'		Semchuk (yellow card) 17'; Oliynyk (penalty missed) 62'; Novokhatskyi 65'; Kripak (yellow card) 82'	Stadium: Olympic National Sports Complex; Attendance: 43,500; Referee: Igor Yarmenchuk

=== UEFA Champions League ===
==== First qualifying round ====
23 July 1997 First leg	Dynamo Kyiv (Ukraine)	2–0	(Wales) Barry Town	Kyiv
19:00 EEST (UTC+3)	Rebrov 19'; Maksymov 79'	Report	Ovendale (yellow card) 75'	Stadium: Dynamo Stadium; Attendance: 12,000; Referee: Oğuz Sarvan (Turkey)

30 July 1997 Second leg	Barry Town (Wales)	0–4 (0–6 agg.)	(Ukraine) Dynamo Kyiv	Barry
21:30 EEST (UTC+3)	Ryan (red card) 75'	Report	Dmytrulin (yellow card) 35'; Kalitvintsev (yellow card) 37'; Byalkevich 52'; Maksymov 64', 77'; Vashchuk 79'	Stadium: Jenner Park Stadium; Attendance: 2,380; Referee: Gylfi Orrason (Iceland)

==== Second qualifying round ====
13 August 1997 First leg	Brøndby (Denmark)	2–4	(Ukraine) Dynamo Kyiv	Brøndbyvester
21:05 EEST (UTC+3)	Bagger 21'; Colding (yellow card) 57'; Nielsen (yellow card) 79'; Daugaard 88' (pen.)	Report	Husin 7' (yellow card) 66'; Shevchenko 34'; Maksymov (yellow card) 55'; Rebrov 76'; Holovko 78'	Stadium: Brøndby Stadium; Attendance: 10,318; Referee: Armand Ancion (Belgium)

27 August 1997 Second leg	Dynamo Kyiv (Ukraine)	0–1 (4–3 agg.)	(Denmark) Brøndby	Kyiv
19:00 EEST (UTC+3)	Shevchenko (yellow card) 82'	Report	Colding 18'; Jensen (yellow card) 47'	Stadium: Dynamo Stadium; Attendance: 17,000; Referee: Stefano Braschi (Italy)

==== Group stage ====
Pos	Team	Pld	W	D	L	GF	GA	GD	Pts	Qualification
1	(Ukraine) Dynamo Kyiv	6	3	2	1	13	6	+7	11	Advance to knockout stage
2	(Netherlands) PSV Eindhoven	6	2	3	1	9	8	+1	9	
3	(England) Newcastle United	6	2	1	3	7	8	−1	7	
4	(Spain) Barcelona	6	1	2	3	7	14	−7	5	

Source: UEFA

17 September 1997 1	PSV Eindhoven (Netherlands)	1–3	(Ukraine) Dynamo Kyiv	Eindhoven
21:45 EEST (UTC+3)	Jonk 40'; Valckx (yellow card) 74'	Report	Holovko (yellow card) 20'; Kalitvintsev (yellow card) 22'; Maksymov 33' (yellow card) 39'; Rebrov 46'; Shevchenko 90'	Stadium: Philips Stadion; Attendance: 27,000; Referee: Rune Pedersen (Norway)

1 October 1997 2	Dynamo Kyiv (Ukraine)	2–2	(England) Newcastle United	Kyiv
21:45 EEST (UTC+3)	Rebrov 4'; Shevchenko 28'	Report	Asprilla (yellow card) 13'; Beresford 78', 85'; Gillespie (yellow card) 81'	Stadium: Olympic National Sports Complex; Attendance: 92,000; Referee: Peter Mikkelsen (Denmark)

22 October 1997 3	Dynamo Kyiv (Ukraine)	3–0	(Spain) Barcelona	Kyiv
21:45 EEST (UTC+3)	Rebrov 6' (yellow card) 52'; Maksymov 32'; Kosovskyi (yellow card) 44'; Kalitvintsev 65'	Report	Óscar (yellow card) 30'; Sergi (yellow card) 35'; Figo (yellow card) 57'; Hesp (red card) 62'; Dugarry (yellow card) 68'; Roger (yellow card) 83'	Stadium: Olympic National Sports Complex; Attendance: 95,030; Referee: Markus Merk (Germany)

5 November 1997 4	Barcelona (Spain)	0–4	(Ukraine) Dynamo Kyiv	Barcelona
21:45 EET (UTC+2)	Couto (yellow card) 2'; Sergi (yellow card) 33' (yellow-red card) 47'	Report	Shevchenko 9', 32', 44' (pen.); Husin (yellow card) 59'; Rebrov 79'	Stadium: Camp Nou; Attendance: 52,200; Referee: Hugh Dallas (Scotland)

27 November 1997 5	Dynamo Kyiv (Ukraine)	1–1	(Netherlands) PSV Eindhoven	Kyiv
21:45 EET (UTC+2)	Rebrov 19'; Luzhnyi (yellow card) 62'	Report	Vampeta (yellow card) 2'; Numan (yellow card) 34'; De Bilde 65'; Stam (yellow card) 90'	Stadium: Olympic National Sports Complex; Attendance: 80,000; Referee: Piero Ceccarini (Italy)

10 December 1997 6	Newcastle United (England)	2–0	(Ukraine) Dynamo Kyiv	Newcastle upon Tyne
21:45 EET (UTC+2)	Barnes 10'; Gillespie (yellow card) 18'; Pearce 21'; Albert (yellow card) 72'	Report	Bezhenar (yellow card) 67'	Stadium: St James' Park; Attendance: 33,694; Referee: Hellmut Krug (Germany)

==== Quarter-finals ====
4 March 1998 First leg	Juventus (Italy)	1–1	(Ukraine) Dynamo Kyiv	Turin
21:45 EET (UTC+2)	Davids (yellow card) 47'; Montero (yellow card) 64'; Inzaghi 69'	Report	Luzhnyi (yellow card) 40'; Husin 56'; Mykhaylenko (yellow card) 84'	Stadium: Stadio Delle Alpi; Attendance: 40,723; Referee: Paul Durkin (England)

18 March 1998 Second leg	Dynamo Kyiv (Ukraine)	1–4 (2–5 agg.)	(Italy) Juventus	Kyiv
21:45 EET (UTC+2)	Rebrov 54'; Gerasimenko (yellow card) 61'	Report	Inzaghi 29', 65', 73'; Del Piero 88'	Stadium: Olympic National Sports Complex; Attendance: 100,069; Referee: Marc Batta (France)

== Statistics ==
=== Appearances and goals ===
As of 18 November 2026

No.	Pos	Nat	Player	Total		Vyshcha Liha		Ukrainian Cup		UEFA Champions League (Note: Includes appearances and goals from the 1997–98 UEFA Champions League qualifying rounds.)	
No.	Pos	Nat	Player	Apps	Goals	Apps	Goals	Apps	Goals	Apps	Goals
1	GK	(Ukraine) UKR	Shovkovskyi	45	0	26+0	0	7+0	0	12+0	0
2	DF	(Ukraine) UKR	Luzhnyi	29	0	16+0	0	3+1	0	9+0	0
3	DF	(Ukraine) UKR	Bezhenar	17	0	5+3	0	2+1	0	3+3	0
4	DF	(Ukraine) UKR	Holovko	47	2	29+0	1	7+0	0	11+0	1
5	DF	(Ukraine) UKR	Vashchuk	36	2	23+0	1	3+1	0	9+0	1
6	DF	(Ukraine) UKR	Dmytrulin	34	1	19+0	1	4+0	0	11+0	0
7	DF	(Georgia (country)) GEO	Kaladze	19	3	13+0	2	6+0	1	0+0	0
8	MF	(Belarus) BLR	Byalkevich	20	3	10+3	1	1+1	1	3+2	1
9	MF	(Ukraine) UKR	Kosovskyi	40	2	24+0	1	7+0	1	9+0	0
10	FW	(Ukraine) UKR	Shevchenko	41	33	20+3	19	7+1	8	10+0	6
11	FW	(Ukraine) UKR	Rebrov	48	37	27+2	22	7+0	7	12+0	8
12	GK	(Ukraine) UKR	Kernozenko	5	0	4+0	0	1+0	0	0+0	0
14	MF	(Ukraine) UKR	Husin	46	5	26+2	2	7+0	1	11+0	2
15	MF	(Belarus) BLR	Khatskevich	27	1	10+5	1	3+0	0	9+0	0
16	MF	(Ukraine) UKR	Samoylov	12	1	10+0	1	2+0	0	0+0	0
18	DF	(Ukraine) UKR	Kardash	16	1	8+2	1	4+1	0	0+1	0
19	MF	(Ukraine) UKR	Mykhaylenko	38	0	6+17	0	4+3	0	1+7	0
20	DF	(Ukraine) UKR	Shmatovalenko	3	0	0+1	0	2+0	0	0+0	0
21	FW	(Ukraine) UKR	Leonenko	2	4	0+0	0	2+0	4	0+0	0
22	MF	(Ukraine) UKR	Maksymov	19	10	10+1	5	0+0	0	5+3	5
23	DF	(Ukraine) UKR	Radchenko	32	1	6+12	1	4+2	0	1+7	0
25	DF	(Ukraine) UKR	Volosyanko	12	0	0+3	0	2+0	0	1+6	0
26	DF	(Ukraine) UKR	Fedorov	2	0	1+0	0	1+0	0	0+0	0
27	FW	(Russia) RUS	Gerasimenko	21	3	8+4	1	6+1	2	2+0	0
—	DF	(Ukraine) UKR	Kovalyuk	3	0	1+2	0	0+0	0	0+0	0
—	DF	(Ukraine) UKR	Nesmachnyi	1	0	1+0	0	0+0	0	0+0	0
—	DF	(Ukraine) UKR	Kyryukhin	8	1	4+2	1	1+1	0	0+0	0
—	DF	(Ukraine) UKR	Polyakov	1	0	0+0	0	0+1	0	0+0	0
—	MF	(Belarus) BLR	M. Makovskiy	2	0	1+1	0	0+0	0	0+0	0
—	MF	(Ukraine) UKR	Kalitvintsev	44	8	18+8	5	4+3	2	11+0	1
—	FW	(Ukraine) UKR	Venhlinskyi	10	0	3+2	0	2+2	0	0+1	0
—	FW	(Ukraine) UKR	Shkapenko	9	2	5+1	2	0+1	0	2+0	0
—	FW	(Ukraine) UKR	Kosyrin	4	0	1+2	0	1+0	0	0+0	0
—	FW	(Belarus) BLR	V. Makovskiy	15	3	5+6	3	0+4	0	0+0	0
—	FW	(Ukraine) UKR	Kozlenko	1	1	0+0	0	0+1	1	0+0	0

=== Top scorers ===
Includes all competitive matches. The list is sorted by shirt number when total goals are equal.

Rnk	No.	Player	Vyshcha Liha	Ukrainian Cup	UEFA Champions League	Total
1	11	(Ukraine) Rebrov	22	7	8	37
2	10	(Ukraine) Shevchenko	19	8	6	33
3	22	(Ukraine) Maksymov	5	0	5	10
4	—	(Ukraine) Kalitvintsev	5	2	1	8
5	14	(Ukraine) Husin	2	1	2	5
6	21	(Ukraine) Leonenko	0	4	0	4
7	7	(Georgia (country)) Kaladze	2	1	0	3
8	8	(Belarus) Byalkevich	1	1	1	3
9	27	(Russia) Gerasimenko	1	2	0	3
10	—	(Belarus) V. Makovskiy	3	0	0	3
11	4	(Ukraine) Holovko	1	0	1	2
12	5	(Ukraine) Vashchuk	1	0	1	2
13	9	(Ukraine) Kosovskyi	1	1	0	2
14	—	(Ukraine) Shkapenko	2	0	0	2
15	6	(Ukraine) Dmytrulin	1	0	0	1
16	15	(Belarus) Khatskevich	1	0	0	1
17	18	(Ukraine) Kardash	1	0	0	1
18	23	(Ukraine) Radchenko	1	0	0	1
19	—	(Ukraine) Kozlenko	0	1	0	1
20	—	(Ukraine) Kyryukhin	1	0	0	1
Totals			70	28	25	123

=== Disciplinary record ===
Includes all competitive matches. Players with 1 card or more included only.

Position	Nation	Number	Name	Vyshcha Liha		Ukrainian Cup		UEFA Champions League		Total	
Position	Nation	Number	Name	Yellow card	Red card	Yellow card	Red card	Yellow card	Red card	Yellow card	Red card
DF	(Ukraine)	2	Oleh Luzhnyi	2	0	0	0	2	0	4	0
DF	(Ukraine)	3	Serhiy Bezhenar	1	0	0	0	1	0	2	0
DF	(Ukraine)	4	Oleksandr Holovko	2	0	0	0	1	0	3	0
DF	(Ukraine)	5	Vladyslav Vashchuk	1	0	0	0	0	0	1	0
DF	(Ukraine)	6	Yuriy Dmytrulin	0	0	0	0	1	0	1	0
DF	(Georgia (country))	7	Kakha Kaladze	1	0	0	0	0	0	1	0
MF	(Ukraine)	9	Vitaliy Kosovskyi	0	0	0	0	1	0	1	0
FW	(Ukraine)	10	Andriy Shevchenko	2	0	1	0	1	0	4	0
FW	(Ukraine)	11	Serhiy Rebrov	1	0	0	0	1	0	2	0
MF	(Ukraine)	14	Andriy Husin	1	0	0	0	2	0	3	0
MF	(Belarus)	15	Alyaksandr Khatskevich	4	0	1	0	1	0	6	0
MF	(Ukraine)	16	Vitaliy Samoylov	1	0	0	0	0	0	1	0
MF	(Ukraine)	19	Dmytro Mykhaylenko	1	0	0	0	1	0	2	0
MF	(Ukraine)	22	Yuriy Maksymov	1	0	0	0	2	0	3	0
FW	(Russia)	27	Aleksei Gerasimenko	2	0	1	0	1	0	4	0
DF	(Ukraine)	—	Volodymyr Kovalyuk	1	0	0	0	0	0	1	0
DF	(Ukraine)	—	Oleksandr Kyryukhin	1	0	0	0	0	0	1	0
MF	(Ukraine)	—	Yuriy Kalitvintsev	2	0	1	0	2	0	5	0
FW	(Ukraine)	—	Oleh Venhlinskyi	1	0	0	0	0	0	1	0
FW	(Belarus)	—	Vladimir Makovskiy	2	0	0	0	0	0	2	0
Totals				27	0	4	0	17	0	48	0

=== Overall ===
Games played	51 (30 Vyshcha Liha, 9 Ukrainian Cup, 12 UEFA Champions League)
Games won	38 (23 Vyshcha Liha, 9 Ukrainian Cup, 6 UEFA Champions League)
Games drawn	6 (3 Vyshcha Liha, 0 Ukrainian Cup, 3 UEFA Champions League)
Games lost	7 (4 Vyshcha Liha, 0 Ukrainian Cup, 3 UEFA Champions League)
Goals scored	123
Goals conceded	36
Goal difference	+87
Clean sheets	26
Yellow cards	48
Red cards	0
Worst discipline	(Belarus) Alyaksandr Khatskevich (6 (yellow card) )
Best result(s)	5–0 (H) v Vorskla Poltava – Vyshcha Liha – 18 May 1998
Worst result(s)	1–4 (H) v Juventus – UEFA Champions League – 27 February 2010
Worst result(s)	2–0 (A) v Newcastle United – UEFA Champions League – 10 December 1997
Most appearances	(Ukraine) Serhiy Rebrov with 48 appearances
Top scorer	(Ukraine) Serhiy Rebrov (37 goals)
