= 1998–99 FC Dynamo Kyiv season =

Dynamo Kyiv
1998–99 season
- Manager: (Ukraine) Valeriy Lobanovskyi
- Ukrainian Premier League: 1st
- Ukrainian Cup: Winners
- UEFA Champions League: Semi-finals
- Top goalscorer: Andriy Shevchenko (18)
Home colours	Away colours

== Season summary ==
1998–99 was a hugely successful season for Dynamo. As well as winning the double of the league title and national cup, they also reached the semi-finals of the Champions League. Dynamo's hopes of a treble were ultimately ended by a Bayern Munich side also chasing a treble.

== Squad ==
=== First-team squad ===
Note: Flags indicate national team as defined under FIFA eligibility rules; some limited exceptions apply. Players may hold more than one non-FIFA nationality.

No.	Pos.	Nation	Player
1	GK	UKR	Oleksandr Shovkovskyi
2	DF	UKR	Oleh Luzhnyi (captain)
3	FW	RUS	Aleksei Gerasimenko
4	DF	UKR	Oleksandr Holovko
5	DF	UKR	Vladyslav Vashchuk
6	DF	UKR	Yuriy Dmytrulin
7	DF	GEO	Kakha Kaladze
9	MF	UKR	Vitaliy Kosovskyi
10	FW	UKR	Andriy Shevchenko
11	FW	UKR	Serhii Rebrov
12	GK	UKR	Vyacheslav Kernozenko
14	MF	UKR	Andriy Husin
15	MF	BLR	Alyaksandr Khatskevich

No.	Pos.	Nation	Player
16	DF	UKR	Oleksandr Radchenko
17	DF	UKR	Serhiy Fedorov
18	DF	UKR	Vasyl Kardash
19	MF	UKR	Dmytro Mykhaylenko
20	MF	BLR	Mihail Makowski
22	MF	UKR	Serhiy Konovalov
23	DF	UKR	Oleksandr Kyryukhin
24	MF	BLR	Valyantsin Byalkevich
25	FW	UKR	Oleh Venhlynskyi
30	MF	UKR	Artem Yashkin
31	MF	UKR	Sergei Kormiltsev
32	DF	UKR	Volodymyr Yezerskiy
—	MF	UKR	Serhiy Serebrennikov

== Coaching staff ==
Position	Staff
Head coach	(Ukraine) Valeriy Lobanovskyi
Assistant coach	(Ukraine) Anatoly Puzach
Assistant coach	(Ukraine) Oleksiy Mykhaylychenko
Assistant coach	(Ukraine) Anatoly Demyanenko
Goalkeeping coach	
First team fitness coach	
Dynamo-2 head coach	
Reserve and youth team coach	
Club doctor	

== Competitions ==
=== Ukrainian Premier League ===
==== League table ====
Pos	Team	Pld	W	D	L	GF	GA	GD	Pts	Qualification or relegation
1	Dynamo Kyiv (Note: Participant of the 1999 Ukrainian Cup Final) (C)	30	23	5	2	75	17	+58	74	Qualification to Champions League second qualifying round
2	Shakhtar Donetsk	30	20	5	5	70	25	+45	65	Qualification to UEFA Cup qualifying round
3	Kryvbas Kryvyi Rih	30	16	11	3	43	18	+25	59	Qualification to UEFA Cup qualifying round
4	Karpaty Lviv	30	15	10	5	54	34	+20	55	Qualification to UEFA Cup first round
5	Metalurh Mariupol	30	14	6	10	35	27	+8	48	

Source: uafootball.net.ua
(C) Champions

=== Ukrainian Premier League ===
- Dynamo Kyiv-Karpaty Lviv 0-0
- Metalist Kharkiv-Dynamo Kyiv 1-6
- Dynamo Kyiv-Nyva Ternopil 1-0
- Shakhtar Donetsk-Dynamo Kyiv 1-2
- Dynamo Kyiv-Dnipro Dnipropetrovsk 2-3
- FC Zirka Kirovohrad-Dynamo Kyiv 0-5
- Dynamo Kyiv-Vorskla 4-0
- Dynamo Kyiv-Metalurh Zaporizhzhia 6-2
- Dynamo Kyiv-FC Spartak Ivano-Frankivsk 7-0
- Kryvbas-Dynamo Kyiv 0-0
- Dynamo Kyiv-Metalurh Donetsk 3-0
- SC Tavriya Simferopol-Dynamo Kyiv 3-3
- Dynamo Kyiv-MFK Mykolaiv 2-1
- Illichivets-Dynamo Kyiv 1-2
- Dynamo Kyiv-Arsenal Kyiv 2-0
- Arsenal Kyiv-Dynamo Kyiv 0-4
- Dynamo Kyiv-Illichivets 2-0
- MFK Mykolaiv-Dynamo Kyiv 0-4
- Dynamo Kyiv-SC Tavriya Simferopol 0-0
- Metalurh Donetsk-Dynamo Kyiv 1-4
- Dynamo Kyiv-Kryvbas 1-0
- FC Spartak Ivano-Frankivsk-Dynamo Kyiv 0-1
- Metalurh Zaporizhzhia-Dynamo Kyiv 1-3
- Vorskla-Dynamo Kyiv 0-2
- Dynamo Kyiv-FC Zirka Kirovohrad 1-0
- Dnipro Dnipropetrovsk-Dynamo Kyiv 0-1
- Dynamo Kyiv-Shakhtar Donetsk 0-0
- Nyva Ternopil-Dynamo Kyiv 1-5
- Dynamo Kyiv-Metalist Kharkiv 1-0
- Karpaty Lviv-Dynamo Kyiv 2-1

=== UEFA Champions League ===
==== First qualifying round ====
First leg	Dynamo Kyiv	8–0	Barry Town United	Kyiv
	Rebrov 9' (16), 37' (82); Khatskevichh (yellow card) 13'; Shevchenko 34' (60); Gerasimenko 48'; Belkevich 65'			Stadium: Olimpiyskiy National Sports Complex; Attendance: 11,800; Referee: Andreas Georgiou

Second leg	Barry Town United	1–2 (1–10 agg.)	Dynamo Kyiv	Barry, Vale of Glamorgan
	Williams 30'		Mykhaylenko 11'; Venglynskyi 50'	Stadium: Jenner Park; Attendance: 890; Referee: Bujar Pregja

==== Second qualifying round ====
First leg	Dynamo Kyiv	0–1	Sparta Prague	Kyiv
	Shevchenko (yellow card) 17'; Vladyslav Vashchuk (yellow card) 40'; Khatskevich (red card)		Baranek 5'; Čížek (yellow card) 10'; Svoboda (yellow card) 56' (yellow-red card) 71'	Stadium: Olimpiyskiy National Sports Complex; Attendance: 15,000; Referee: Bernd Heynemann

Second leg	Sparta Prague	0–1 (1–1 agg.) (1-3 p)	Dynamo Kyiv	Prague
			Votava (o.g.)	Stadium: epet Arena; Referee: Gilles Veissière
	Penalties
	Cizek (penalty scored); Votava (penalty missed); Stracený (penalty missed); Baranek (penalty missed)		Rebrov (penalty scored); Kaladze (penalty scored); Shevchenko (penalty missed); Konovalov (penalty missed); Dmytrulin (penalty scored)

==== Group stage ====
21 October 1998 1	(England) Arsenal	1–1	(Ukraine) Dynamo Kyiv	Wembley Stadium
	Bergkamp 73'		Rebrov 90'	Attendance: 73,256; Referee: Ryszard Wójcik

16 September 1998 2	(Greece) Panathinaikos	2–1	(Ukraine) Dynamo Kyiv	Nikos Goumas Stadium
	Mykland 56'; Liberopoulos 69'			Attendance: 20,310; Referee: Vítor Melo Pereira (Portugal)

30 September 1998 3	(Ukraine) Dynamo Kyiv	1–1	(France) Lens	Olimpiyskiy National Sports Complex
	Shevchenko 61'		Vairelles 62'	Attendance: 52,500; Referee: Günter Benkö (Austria)

4 November 1998 4	(Ukraine) Dynamo Kyiv	3–1	(England) Arsenal	Olimpiyskiy National Sports Complex
	Rebrov 27'; Golovko 62'; Shevchenko 72'		Stephen Hughes 83'	Attendance: 76,600; Referee: Piero Ceccarini

25 November 1998 5	(Ukraine) Dynamo Kyiv	2–1	(Greece) Panathinaikos	Olimpiyskiy National Sports Complex
	Sergiy Rebrov 72'; Basinas (o.g.),		Lagonikakis 36'	Attendance: 45,000; Referee: Hellmut Krug

9 December 1998 6	(France) Lens	1–3	(Ukraine) Dynamo Kyiv	Stade Bollaert-Delelis
	Déhu (red card); Vladimir Smicer 77'		Kakhaber Kaladze 60'; Vashchuk 76'; Andriy Shevchenko 85'	Attendance: 39,423; Referee: Lubos Michel

===== Quarter-finals =====
First leg	(Ukraine) Dynamo Kyiv	1–1	(Spain) Real Madrid	Kyiv
7:45 EET (UTC+02:00)	Shevchenko 54'		Mijatović 66'	Stadium: Valeriy Lobanovskyi Dynamo Stadium; Attendance: 35,183; Referee: Stefano Braschi

Second leg	(Spain) Real Madrid	0–2	(Ukraine) Dynamo Kyiv	Madrid
7:45 EET (UTC+02:00)			Andriy Shevchenko 62' (79)	Stadium: Santiago Bernabéu; Attendance: 81,500; Referee: Anders Frisk

===== Semi-finals =====
7 April 1999 First leg	(Ukraine) Dynamo Kyiv	3–3	(Germany) Bayern Munich	Kyiv
7:45 PM	Shevchenko 16' (43); Kosovskyi 50'		Michael Tarnat 45'; Effenberg 78'; Jancker 88'	Stadium: Valeriy Lobanovskyi Dynamo Stadium; Attendance: 80,000; Referee: Kim Milton Nielsen (Denmark)

21 April 1999 Second leg	(Germany) Bayern Munich	1–0 (4–3 agg.)	(Ukraine) Dynamo Kyiv	Munich
7:45 PM	Basler 35'			Stadium: Olympiastadion; Attendance: 60,000; Referee: Vítor Pereira (Portugal)

=== Ukrainian Cup ===
8 Novembeber 1998 First round	SK Odesa	2–4	Dynamo Kyiv	Stadion Chornomorets
12:00 EEST (UTC+3)	Spitsyn 15'; Strizhakov 76'		Makovski 3' (26); Gerasimenko 33'; Khatskevich (yellow card) 70'; Venhlinskyi 88'	Attendance: 20,000; Referee: Volodymyr Petrov

12 November 1998 First round	Dynamo Kyiv	4–0 (8–2 agg.)	SK Odesa	Valeriy Lobanovsky Stadion
4:15 EEST (UTC+3)	Shevchenko 44' (58); Kiryukhin (yellow card) 52'; Rebrov 60'; Kosovskyi			Attendance: 500; Referee: Igor Ishchenko

16 November 1998 Quarterfinals	Metalist Kharkiv	1–2	Dynamo Kyiv	Metalist Oblast Sports Complex
1:00 EEST (UTC+3)	Roman Pets 41'		Kosovskyi 16'; Gusin 65'	Attendance: 15,000; Referee: Igor Khiblin

20 November 1998 Quarterfinals	FC Dynamo Kyiv	3–0 (5–1 agg.)	Metalist Kharkiv	Valeriy Lobanovsky Stadium
4:00 EEST (UTC+3)	Rebrov 66' (88); Pets (o.g.)		Pets (yellow card) 25'	Attendance: 500; Referee: Valeriy Onufer

28 April 1999 Semi-finals	Zirka Kirovograd	1–5	Dynamo Kyiv	KSK Nika
4:00 EEST (UTC+3)	Gusev 57'		Rebrov 23' (40); Shevchenko 26'; Khatskevich 67' (85)	Attendance: 5,500; Referee: Vasyl Melnychuk

6 May 1999 Semi-finals	Dynamo Kyiv	1–0 (6–1 agg.)	Zirka Kirovograd	Valeriy Lobanovsky Stadion
5:00 EEST (UTC+3)	Gerasimenko (yellow card) 15'; Kormiltsev 85'		Shapovalov (yellow card) 29'	Attendance: 12,000; Referee: Valeriy Onufer

30 May 1999 Final	Dynamo Kyiv	3–0	Karpaty Lviv	Olimpiyskiy National Sports Complex
11:00 EEST (UTC+3)	Shevchenko 18' (67); Byalkevich 67'; Vashchuk (yellow card) 40'		Zakotyuk (yellow card) 17'; Mizin (yellow card) 68'	Attendance: 71,000; Referee: Vasyl Melnychuk
