= 2000 Ukrainian Cup final =

- Event: Ukrainian Cup 1999-00
Dynamo Kyiv	Kryvbas Kryvyi Rih
1	0
- Date: 27 May 2000
- Venue: NSC Olimpiyskiy, Kyiv
- Referee: V. Onufer (Uzhhorod)
- Attendance: 45,500
- Weather: 27 °C

The 2000 Ukrainian Cup final was a football match that took place at the NSC Olimpiyskiy on 27 May 2000. The match was the 9th Ukrainian Cup Final and it was contested by Dynamo Kyiv and Kryvbas Kryvyi Rih. The 2000 Ukrainian Cup Final was the ninth to be held in the Ukrainian capital Kyiv. Dynamo won by one goal.

== Match details ==
27 May 2000
17:00 LST

Dynamo Kyiv	1–0	Kryvbas Kryvyi Rih
Aliaksandr Khatskevich 44'	Report

NSC Olimpiyskiy, Kyiv
Attendance: 45,500
Referee: Valeriy Onufer (Uzhhorod)

Dynamo Kyiv	Kryvbas Kryvyi Rih

Dynamo Kyiv:
GK	12	(Ukraine) Vyacheslav Kernozenko
XX	8	(Belarus) Aliaksandr Khatskevich
XX	2	(Russia) Ramiz Mamedov		(substituted off) 56'
XX	6	(Ukraine) Oleksandr Holovko (c)
XX	5	(Ukraine) Vladyslav Vashchuk
XX	10	(Ukraine) Yuri Dmitrulin	(yellow card) 90'
XX	3	(Georgia (country)) Kakha Kaladze
XX	7	(Belarus) Valiatsin Bialkevich
XX	4	(Ukraine) Andriy Husin
XX	9	(Uzbekistan) Maxim Shatskikh		(substituted off) 73'
XX	11	(Ukraine) Serhii Rebrov
Substitutes:
XX	XX	(Russia) Aleksei Gerasimenko
XX	XX	(Ukraine) Serhiy Kormiltsev
XX	27	(Georgia (country)) Georgi Demetradze		(substituted in) 73'
GK	XX	(Ukraine) Mar'yan Marushchak
XX	XX	(Ukraine) Dmytro Mykhailenko
XX	XX	(Ukraine) Ihor Kostyuk
XX	XX	(Ukraine) Artem Yashkin	(yellow card) 75'	(substituted in) 56'
Manager:
(Ukraine) Valeriy Lobanovsky

Kryvbas Kryvyi Rih:
GK	XX	(Ukraine) Oleksandr Lavrentsov
XX	XX	(Ukraine) Volodymyr Yezersky		(substituted off) 88'
XX	XX	(Ukraine) Anton Monakhov
XX	XX	(Ukraine) Oleksandr Hranovsky
XX	XX	(Ukraine) Oleksandr Zotov (c)	(yellow card) 75'
XX	XX	(Russia) Oleg Simakov	(yellow card) 45'	(substituted off) 87'
XX	XX	(Ukraine) Serhiy Mizin
XX	XX	(Ukraine) Ivan Hetsko	(yellow card) 69'
XX	XX	(Ukraine) Oleksandr Palyanytsia		(substituted off) 74'
XX	XX	(Ukraine) Hennadiy Moroz
XX	XX	(Ukraine) Volodymyr Ponomarenko
Substitutes:
GK	XX	(Russia) Sergei Pravkin
XX	XX	(Ukraine) Valentyn Platonov		(substituted in) 88'
XX	XX	(Lithuania) Andrius Joksas		(substituted in) 87'
XX	XX	(Ukraine) Yevhen Rymshyn		(substituted in) 74'
XX	XX	(Ukraine) Oleksandr Yevsyukov
FW	XX	(Georgia (country)) Aleksandr Kaidarashvili
XX	XX	(Ukraine) Denys Kolchin
Manager:
(Ukraine) Oleh Taran

MATCH OFFICIALS

- Assistant referees:
  - Volodymyr Petrov (Kharkiv)
  - Volodymyr Yuhas (Uzhhorod)
- Fourth official: Anatoliy Zhosan (Kherson)

MATCH RULES

- 90 minutes.
- 30 minutes of extra-time if necessary.
- Penalty shoot-out if scores still level.
- Seven named substitutes
- Maximum of 3 substitutions.
