= 1998 Ukrainian Cup final =

- Event: 1997–98 Ukrainian Cup
| Dynamo Kyiv | CSKA Kyiv |
| 2 | 1 |
- Date: 31 May 1998
- Venue: NSC Olimpiyskiy, Kyiv
- Referee: Ihor Yarmenchuk (Kyiv)
- Attendance: 43,500
- Weather: 25°C

The 1998 Ukrainian Cup final was a football match that took place at the NSC Olimpiyskiy on May 31, 1998. The match was the 7th Ukrainian Cup Final and it was contested by both Kyivan clubs FC Dynamo Kyiv and FC CSKA Kyiv. The 1998 Ukrainian Cup Final was the seventh to be held in the Ukrainian capital Kyiv. Dynamo won by two goals netted by Andriy Shevchenko on the 1st and 33rd minutes. CSKA managed to answer with a single tally from Novokhatsky on the 68th minute, which was scored on the rebound right after the missed penalty kick. Shovkovskyi managed to deflect the penalty kick from Oliynyk.

There also were several yellow cards issued at this game, all of them to Army players: Semchuk, Hohil, and Kripak.

== Road to Kyiv ==
Both teams started from the first round of the competition (1/16). Dynamo did not have any difficulties along the way meeting almost no resistance from every team. Especially surprising was the face-off with Chornomorets Odesa which ended with an unbelievable 4-1 win for the white-blues in Odesa. CSKA impressed when it easily defeated Dnipro Dnipropetrovsk in the away game.

== Match details ==
1998-05-31
?:? LST

| Dynamo Kyiv | 2 – 1 | CSKA Kyiv |
|---|---|---|
| Shevchenko 1', 33' | Report | (penalty missed) 62' Oliynyk; 65' Novokhatskyi |

NSC Olimpiyskiy, Kyiv
Attendance: 43,500
Referee: Ihor Yarmenchuk (Kyiv), (FIFA)

| Dynamo Kyiv | CSKA Kyiv |

Dynamo Kyiv:
| GK | 1 | (Ukraine) Oleksandr Shovkovskyi |
| DF | 2 | (Ukraine) Oleksandr Kyryukhin |
| FW | 7 | (Russia) Aleksei Gerasimenko | (substituted off) 63' |
| DF | 3 | (Ukraine) Oleksandr Holovko |
| DF | 4 | (Ukraine) Vladyslav Vashchuk |
| MF | 5 | (Ukraine) Andriy Husin | (substituted off) 66' |
| DF | 6 | (Georgia (country)) Kakha Kaladze |
| MF | 8 | (Ukraine) Vasyl Kardash | (substituted off) 89' |
| MF | 9 | (Ukraine) Vitaliy Kosovskyi |
| FW | 10 | (Ukraine) Andriy Shevchenko |
| FW | 11 | (Ukraine) Serhii Rebrov |
Substitutes:
| MF | ? | (Ukraine) Yuriy Kalitvintsev | (substituted in) 63' |
| MF | ? | (Ukraine) Dmytro Mykhaylenko | (substituted in) 66' |
| DF | ? | (Ukraine) Oleksandr Radchenko | (substituted in) 89' |
Manager:
(Ukraine) Valeriy Lobanovskyi

CSKA Kyiv:
| GK | ? | (Ukraine) Vitaliy Reva |
| DF | ? | (Tajikistan) Vitaliy Levchenko |
| MF | ? | (Ukraine) Anatoliy Balatskyi | (substituted off) 63' |
| MF | ? | (Ukraine) Vitaliy Balytskyi |
| MF | ? | (Ukraine) Dmytro Semchuk | (yellow card) 17' |
| FW | ? | (Ukraine) Viktor Ulyanytskyi |
| DF | ? | (Ukraine) Ihor Hohil | (yellow card) 29' | (substituted off) 46' |
| DF | ? | (Ukraine) Yakiv Kripak | (yellow card) 82' |
| MF | ? | (Ukraine) Oleksiy Horodov |
| FW | ? | (Ukraine) Oleksiy Oliynyk |
| DF | ? | (Ukraine) Eduard Tsykhmeystruk |
Substitutes:
| DF | ? | (Ukraine) Serhiy Ilchenko | (substituted in) 63' |
| FW | ? | (Ukraine) Vasyl Novokhatskyi | (substituted in) 46' |
Manager:
(Ukraine) Volodymyr Bezsonov

MATCH OFFICIALS

- Assistant referees:
  - Mykhaylo Ovchar (Kalush)
  - Yuriy Derevyanko (Lviv)
- Fourth official: Serhiy Tatulian (Kyiv)

MATCH RULES

- 90 minutes.
- 30 minutes of extra-time if necessary.
- Penalty shoot-out if scores still level.
- Seven named substitutes
- 3 substitutions, plus two more in extra time.

Ukrainian Cup 1998 Winners

FC Dynamo Kyiv
Third title

== Match statistics ==
| | Shakhtar | Dnipro |
|---|---|---|
| Total shots | ? | ? |
| Shots on target | ? | ? |
| Ball possession | ?% | ?% |
| Corner kicks | ? | ? |
| Fouls committed | ? | ? |
| Offsides | ? | ? |
| Yellow cards | ? | ? |
| Red cards | ? | ? |

== See also ==
- Ukrainian Cup 1997-98
