= 1999 Ukrainian Cup final =

- Event: Ukrainian Cup 1998-99
Dynamo Kyiv	Karpaty Lviv
3	0
- Date: 30 May 1999
- Venue: NSC Olimpiyskiy, Kyiv
- Referee: Vasyl Melnychuk (Simferopol)
- Attendance: 71,000
- Weather: 25 °C

The 1999 Ukrainian Cup final was a football match that took place at the NSC Olimpiyskiy on 30 May 1999. The match was the 8th Ukrainian Cup Final and it was contested by Dynamo Kyiv and Karpaty Lviv. The 1999 Ukrainian Cup Final was the eighth to be held in the Ukrainian capital Kyiv. Dynamo won by three goals.

== Match details ==
30 May 1999
17:00 LST

Dynamo Kyiv	3–0	Karpaty Lviv
Andriy Shevchenko 18', 67'; Valiatsin Bialkevich 19'	Report

NSC Olimpiyskiy, Kyiv
Attendance: 71,000
Referee: Vasyl Melnychuk (Simferopol)

Dynamo Kyiv	Karpaty Lviv

Dynamo Kyiv:
GK	1	(Ukraine) Oleksandr Shovkovskyi
XX	2	(Ukraine) Oleh Luzhnyi (c)
XX	8	(Belarus) Aliaksandr Khatskevich		(substituted off) 80'
XX	3	(Ukraine) Oleksandr Holovko
XX	4	(Ukraine) Vladyslav Vashchuk	(yellow card) 40'
XX	6	(Ukraine) Yuri Dmitrulin
XX	9	(Russia) Aleksei Gerasimenko
XX	7	(Belarus) Valiatsin Bialkevich
XX	5	(Ukraine) Andriy Husin
XX	10	(Ukraine) Andriy Shevchenko
XX	11	(Ukraine) Serhii Rebrov		(substituted off) 79'
Substitutes:
XX	XX	(Russia) Serhiy Kormiltsev		(substituted in) 80'
XX	XX	(Russia) Serhiy Serebrennikov		(substituted in) 79'
GK	XX	(Ukraine) Vyacheslav Kernozenko
XX	XX	(Ukraine) Serhiy Konovalov
XX	XX	(Ukraine) Oleksandr Kiryukhin
XX	XX	(Ukraine) Vasyl Kardash
XX	XX	(Russia) Artem Yashkin
Manager:
(Ukraine) Valeriy Lobanovsky

Karpaty Lviv:
GK	XX	(Ukraine) Bohdan Strontsitskyi
XX	XX	(Ukraine) Oleksandr Yevtushok
XX	XX	(Ukraine) Oleksandr Chyzhevsky (c)		(substituted off) 24'
XX	XX	(Ukraine) Serhiy Mizin	(yellow card) 68'
XX	XX	(Ukraine) Yuri Benyo
XX	XX	(Ukraine) Mykola Zakotyuk	(yellow card) 17'
XX	XX	(Ukraine) Lyubomyr Vovchuk		(substituted off) 53'
XX	XX	(Ukraine) Yevhen Nazarov		(substituted off) 62'
XX	XX	(Ukraine) Oleksandr Palyanytsia
XX	XX	(Ukraine) Ivan Hetsko
FW	XX	(Ukraine) Roman Tolochko
Substitutes:
XX	XX	(Ukraine) Volodymyr Vilchynskyi		(substituted in) 24'
XX	XX	(Ukraine) Mykhaylo Lutsyshyn		(substituted in) 53'
XX	XX	(Ukraine) Serhiy Kovalets		(substituted in) 62'
XX	XX	(Ukraine) Oleh Bereskyi
XX	XX	(Ukraine) Serhiy Yevhlevskyi
XX	XX	(Ukraine) Oleh Tymchyshyn
XX	XX	(Ukraine) Dmytro Semochko
Manager:
(Ukraine) Stepan Yurchyshyn

MATCH OFFICIALS

- Assistant referees:
  - Volodymyr Petrov (Kharkiv)
  - Anatoliy Oliynyk (Simferopol)
- Fourth official: Serhiy Shebek (Kyiv)

MATCH RULES

- 90 minutes.
- 30 minutes of extra-time if necessary.
- Penalty shoot-out if scores still level.
- Seven named substitutes
- Maximum of 3 substitutions.
