= List of Ukraine international footballers born outside Ukraine =

This page is about the naturalized and foreign-born Ukrainian players who played one match (minimum) for the Ukraine senior national football team. The list does not contain footballers who played for Ukraine was union republic within the Soviet Union such as friendlies, tours abroad, the Spartakiads of the Peoples of the Soviet Union, others.

The players in bold are currently playing for the National team

== Belarus ==
=== Born during the Soviet Union ===
- Artem Milevskyi 2006–2012

== Brazil ==
- Edmar 2011–2014
- Marlos 2017–2021
- Júnior Moraes 2019–2021

== Cuba ==
- Vyacheslav Kernozenko 2000–2008

== (Georgia (country)) Georgia ==
=== Born during the Soviet Union ===
- Serhiy Danylovskyi 2007
- Akhrik Tsveiba 1992

== Germany ==
=== Born in the East Germany ===
- Oleh Kuznetsov 1992–1994

== Israel ==
- **Viktor Tsyhankov** 2016–

== Kazakhstan ==
=== Born during the Soviet Union ===
- Serhiy Skachenko 1994–2002
- Dmytro Yakovenko 1993

== Kyrgyzstan ==
=== Born during the Soviet Union ===
- Yuriy Hudymenko 1992

== Russia ==
=== Born during the Soviet Union ===
- Oleksandr Aliyev 2008–2012
- Aleksei Bakharev 2002
- Tymerlan Huseynov 1993–1997
- Yuriy Kalitvintsev 1995–1999
- Serhiy Kandaurov 1992–2000
- Sergei Kormiltsev 2000–2004
- Maksym Levytskyi 2000–2002
- Viktor Leonenko 1992–1996
- Andriy Nesmachniy 2000–2009
- Oleg Salenko 1992
- Serhiy Serebrennikov 2001–2006
- Dmytro Tyapushkin 1994–1995
- **Andriy Yarmolenko** 2009–
- Artem Yashkin 2000–2001
- Andriy Yudin 1992

=== Born after the Soviet Union ===
- **Maksym Talovyerov** 2024–

== Serbia ==
=== Born during the SFR Yugoslavia ===
- Marko Dević 2008–2014

== List of countries ==
Country of birth	Total
Russia	16
Brazil	3
Georgia	2
Kazakhstan	2
Belarus	1
Cuba	1
Germany	1
Israel	1
Kyrgyzstan	1
Serbia	1
