= Uladzimir Makowski =

Belarusian footballer and coach

Personal information
- Date of birth: 23 April 1977 (age 49)
- Place of birth: Molodechno, Belarusian SSR
- Height: 1.84 m (6 ft 1/2 in)
- Position: Forward

Senior career*
Years	Team	Apps	(Gls)
1992–1993	Elektromodul Molodechno	31	(8)
1993–1995	Molodechno	47	(11)
1996–1997	Dinamo Minsk	57	(39)
1998–2004	Dynamo Kyiv	14	(4)
1998–1999	→ Dynamo-2 Kyiv	33	(8)
1999	→ Dynamo-3 Kyiv	1	(0)
1999	→ Baltika Kaliningrad (loan)	15	(2)
2000	→ Vorskla Poltava (loan)	15	(2)
2000	→ CSKA Kyiv (loan)	7	(0)
2000	→ CSKA-2 Kyiv (loan)	1	(0)
2000	→ Vorskla-2 Poltava (loan)	4	(0)
2001–2002	→ Zakarpattia Uzhhorod (loan)	48	(2)
2002	→ Zakarpattia-2 Uzhhorod (loan)	3	(0)
2003	→ Baltika Kaliningrad (loan)	1	(0)
2003	→ Dinamo Minsk (loan)	12	(1)
2004	→ Torpedo-SKA Minsk (loan)	19	(4)
2004–2006	Inter Baku	52	(11)
2007	Darida Minsk Raion	25	(4)
2008	Naftan Novopolotsk	27	(7)
2009	Granit Mikashevichi	16	(0)
2010–2012	Gorodeya	59	(25)
2013–2014	Isloch Minsk Raion	3	(0)

International career
1995–1997	Belarus U21	11	(4)
1995–2000	Belarus	28	(4)

Managerial career
- 2012–2013: Gorodeya (assistant)
- 2013–2016: Isloch Minsk Raion (assistant)
- * Club domestic league appearances and goals

Uladzimir Makowski (Belarusian: Уладзімір Макоўскі; Russian: Владимир Михайлович Маковский; born 23 April 1977) is a Belarusian football coach and former player.

== Career ==
=== Match Fixing ===
In August 2016, while assistant manager at Isloch Minsk Raion, Makowski was alleged to have been involved in fixing a match with Dinamo Brest on 30 April 2016, along with Alyaksandr Lebedzew, Alyaksandr Tsishkevich, Aleksandr Budakov, Aleksandr Alumona and Andrey Paryvayew. On 20 February 2018, the BFF, having found him guilty of match-fixing, banned him from football for life.

== International goals ==
Scores and results list Belarus' goal tally first.

No	Date	Venue	Opponent	Score	Result	Competition
1.	31 August 1996	Dinamo, Minsk, Belarus	Estonia	1–0	1–0	1998 World Cup qualifier
2.	9 October 1996	Dinamo, Minsk, Belarus	Latvia	1–1	1–1	1998 World Cup qualifier
3.	7 June 1998	Dinamo, Minsk, Belarus	Lithuania	3–0	5–0	Friendly match
4.	19 August 1998	Žalgiris Stadium, Vilnius, Lithuania	Lithuania	2–0	3–0	Friendly match

== Personal life ==
He is the twin brother of Mihail Makowski.

== Azerbaijan Career statistics ==
Club performance			League		Cup		Continental		Total	
Season	Club	League	Apps	Goals	Apps	Goals	Apps	Goals	Apps	Goals
Azerbaijan			League		Azerbaijan Cup		Europe		Total	
2004-05	Inter Baku	Azerbaijan Premier League	29	9			-		29	9
2005-06	Inter Baku	Azerbaijan Premier League	23	2			-		23	2
Total	Azerbaijan		52	11			0	0	52	11
Career total			52	11			0	0	52	11

== Honours ==
=== Club ===
Dinamo Minsk

- Belarusian Premier League champion: 1997

Dynamo Kyiv

- Ukrainian Premier League champion: 1997–98, 1998–99
- Ukrainian Cup winner: 1997–98, 1998–99

Naftan Novopolotsk

- Belarusian Cup winner: 2008–09

=== Individual ===
- CIS Cup top goalscorer: 1996
- Belarusian Footballer of the Year: 1996
