= Mihail Makowski =

Belarusian footballer and coach

Personal information
- Date of birth: 23 April 1977 (age 49)
- Place of birth: Molodechno, Belarusian SSR
- Height: 1.86 m (6 ft 1 in)
- Position: Midfielder

Youth career
- 1992–1993: Molodechno

Senior career*
Years	Team	Apps	(Gls)
1992–1993	Elektromodul Molodechno	34	(5)
1993–1995	Molodechno	48	(11)
1996–1997	Dinamo Minsk	55	(14)
1998–2004	Dynamo Kyiv	2	(0)
1998–1999	→ Dynamo-2 Kyiv	35	(7)
1998–1999	→ Dynamo-3 Kyiv	5	(0)
1999–2000	→ Vorskla Poltava (loan)	22	(1)
1999	→ Vorskla-2 Poltava (loan)	2	(0)
2000	→ CSKA Kyiv (loan)	1	(0)
2000	→ CSKA-2 Kyiv (loan)	2	(0)
2000	→ Vorskla-2 Poltava (loan)	4	(1)
2001–2002	→ Zakarpattia Uzhhorod (loan)	41	(3)
2002	→ Zakarpattia-2 Uzhhorod (loan)	4	(1)
2003	→ Dinamo Minsk (loan)	2	(0)
2004	→ CSKA Kyiv (loan)	17	(4)
2004–2006	Inter Baku	48	(9)
2007	Darida Minsk Raion	4	(0)
2008	Zakarpattia Uzhhorod	5	(0)
2009–2011	Gorodeya	45	(2)
2012	Smorgon	20	(1)

International career
1996–1999	Belarus U21	23	(0)
1997	Belarus	1	(0)

Managerial career
- 2014–2017: Isloch Minsk Raion (assistant)
- 2017: Neman-Agro Stolbtsy
- * Club domestic league appearances and goals

Mihail Makowski (Belarusian: Міхаіл Макоўскі; Russian: Михаил Михайлович Маковский; born 23 April 1977) is a Belarusian professional football coach and former player.

He is the twin brother of Uladzimir Makowski.

== Honours ==
Dinamo Minsk

- Belarusian Premier League champion: 1997

Dinamo Kyiv

- Ukrainian Premier League champion: 1997–98
- Ukrainian Cup winner: 1997–98

== Azerbaijan Career statistics ==
Club performance			League		Cup		Continental		Total	
Season	Club	League	Apps	Goals	Apps	Goals	Apps	Goals	Apps	Goals
Azerbaijan			League		Azerbaijan Cup		Europe		Total	
2004-05	Inter Baku	Azerbaijan Premier League	26	8			-		26	8
2005-06	Inter Baku	Azerbaijan Premier League	22	1			-		22	1
Total	Azerbaijan		48	9			0	0	48	9
Career total			48	9			0	0	48	9
