= Vitaliy Samoylov =

Ukrainian footballer

Personal information
- Full name: Vitaliy Olehovych Samoylov
- Date of birth: 1 March 1975 (age 51)
- Place of birth: Kyiv, Ukrainian SSR
- Height: 1.81 m (5 ft 11 1/2 in)
- Position: Midfielder

Senior career*
| Years | Team | Apps | (Gls) |
| 1992–1998 | FC Dynamo Kyiv | 5 | (0) |
| 1992–1998 | → FC Dynamo-3 Kyiv | ? | (?) |
| 1992–1993 | → FC Naftovyk-2 Okhtyrka (loan) | ? | (?) |
| 1993–1998 | → FC Dynamo-2 Kyiv | 98 | (35) |
| 1993–1994 | → FC Skala Stryi (loan) | 1 | (0) |
| 1996–1997 | → FC Vorskla Poltava (loan) | 7 | (1) |
| 1998 | FC Vorskla Poltava | 25 | (2) |
| 1999 | FC Baltika Kaliningrad | 20 | (1) |
| 2000–2003 | FC Sokol Saratov | 79 | (7) |
| 2003–2004 | FC Obolon Kyiv | 5 | (1) |
| 2004 | FC Rotor Volgograd | 4 | (0) |
- * Club domestic league appearances and goals

Vitaliy Olehovych Samoylov (Ukrainian: Віталій Олегович Самойлов; born 1 March 1975) is a Ukrainian former football player.

== Honours ==
Dynamo Kyiv

- Ukrainian Premier League champion: 1996–97
- Ukrainian Cup winner: 1997–98

Vorskla Poltava

- Ukrainian Premier League bronze: 1996–97
