= Pavlo Shkapenko =

Ukrainian footballer (1972–2023)

Personal information
- Full name: Pavlo Leonidovych Shkapenko
- Date of birth: 16 December 1972
- Place of birth: Zaporizhzhia, Ukrainian SSR, Soviet Union
- Date of death: 17 April 2023 (aged 50)
- Height: 1.77 m (5 ft 10 in)
- Position: Attacking midfielder

Youth career
- Transformator Zaporizhzhia
- Metalurh Zaporizhzhia

Senior career*
Years	Team	Apps	(Gls)
1990–1992	Metalurh Zaporizhzhia	19	(4)
1992–1998	Dynamo Kyiv	121	(33)
1995–1998	→ Dynamo-2 Kyiv	45	(13)
1998	→ Dynamo-3 Kyiv	5	(2)
1998	CSKA Kyiv	14	(2)
1998	→ CSKA-2 Kyiv	1	(1)
1999	Uralan Elista	1	(0)
1999–2001	Torpedo Moscow	35	(5)
2000	→ Torpedo-2 Moscow	2	(0)
2001	Shinnik Yaroslavl	16	(8)
2002	Tom Tomsk	23	(6)
2003–2004	Kuban Krasnodar	14	(0)
Total		296	(74)

International career
1993–1997	Ukraine	10	(0)
- * Club domestic league appearances and goals

Pavlo Leonidovych Shkapenko (Ukrainian: Павло Леонідович Шкапенко; 16 December 1972 – 17 April 2023) was a Ukrainian professional footballer who played as an attacking midfielder.

== Club career ==
Shkapenko made his professional debut in the Soviet First League in 1990 for FC Metalurh Zaporizhzhia.

== Death ==
Shkapenko died on 17 April 2023, at the age of 50.

== Honours ==
- Ukrainian Premier League champion: 1993, 1994, 1995, 1996, 1997.
- Ukrainian Cup winner: 1993, 1996.
- 17 games, 2 goals in European club competitions, including 1 game for FC Torpedo Moscow in the UEFA Cup 2000–01.
