= Vladyslav Sukhomlynov =

Ukrainian footballer

Personal information
- Full name: Vladyslav Sukhomlynov
- Date of birth: 2 January 1978 (age 48)
- Place of birth: Soviet Union
- Height: 1.80 m (5 ft 11 in)
- Position: Midfielder

Senior career*
Years	Team	Apps	(Gls)
1998	Dynamo-3 Kyiv	9	(1)
1998–1999	Borysfen Boryspil	23	(2)
1999–2000	Chornomorets-2 Odesa	28	(6)
1999–2000	Chornomorets Odesa	2	(0)
2000	Borysfen Boryspil	8	(0)
2001	Kryvbas Kryvyi Rih	3	(0)
2001	Panachaiki	2	(0)
2002	Obolon-2 Kyiv	12	(1)
2002	Obolon Kyiv	3	(0)
2002	Metalist-2 Kharkiv	2	(0)
2002–2003	Metalist Kharkiv	20	(0)
2004	Boreks-Borysfen Borodianka	14	(2)
2004–2005	Borysfen Boryspil	14	(1)
2005	Irtysh Pavlodar	8	(1)
2005–2006	Borysfen Boryspil	36	(3)
2007–2008	CSKA Kyiv	51	(2)
2007–2008	Irpin Horenychi		
- * Club domestic league appearances and goals

Vladyslav Sukhomlynov (Ukrainian: Владислав Валерьевич Сухомлинов; born 2 January 1978) is a retired footballer who played as a midfielder for clubs in Ukraine, Greece and Kazakhstan.

== Club career ==
Sukhomlynov spent most of his career playing football for Ukrainian Premier League sides FC Borysfen Boryspil, FC Chornomorets Odesa, FC Kryvbas Kryvyi Rih and FC Metalist Kharkiv. He also spent time in the Ukrainian lower leagues with Borysfen Boryspil, FC Inter Boyarka and FC CSKA Kyiv.

In July 2001, Sukhomlynov joined Super League Greece side Panachaiki for six months.
