= Maryan Marushchak =

Ukrainian footballer (born 1979)

Personal information
- Full name: Maryan Osypovych Marushchak
- Date of birth: 10 May 1979 (age 47)
- Place of birth: Drohobych, Ukrainian SSR
- Height: 1.90 m (6 ft 3 in)
- Position: Goalkeeper

Senior career*
Years	Team	Apps	(Gls)
1996–1999	Lviv	79	(0)
1999	→ Karpaty Lviv (loan)	0	(0)
2000–2001	Dynamo Kyiv	0	(0)
2000–2001	→ Dynamo-2 Kyiv	20	(0)
2000–2001	→ Dynamo-3 Kyiv	12	(0)
2002	Zakarpattia Uzhhorod	1	(0)
2002	Kryvbas Kryvyi Rih	0	(0)
2003	Obolon Kyiv	1	(0)
2003–2006	CSKA Kyiv	53	(0)
2004	→ Vorskla Poltava (loan)	0	(0)
2004	→ Vorskla-2 Poltava (loan)	1	(0)
2005	→ Zakarpattia Uzhhorod (loan)	1	(0)
2007–2010	Lviv	67	(0)
2010	Sevastopol	3	(0)
2011–2013	Arsenal Bila Tserkva	26	(0)
- * Club domestic league appearances and goals

Maryan Marushchak (Ukrainian: Мар'ян Осипович Марущак; born 10 May 1979) is a Ukrainian former professional football goalkeeper.
