= 1997–98 Ukrainian Cup =

1997—98 Ukrainian Cup
Kubok Ukrainy

Tournament details
- Country: Ukraine
- Dates: 14 July 1997 – 31 May 1998
- Teams: 90

Final positions
- Champions: Dynamo Kyiv (3rd title)
- Runners-up: CSKA Kyiv

Tournament statistics
- Top goal scorer: Andriy Shevchenko (8)

The 1997–98 Ukrainian Cup was the seventh annual edition of Ukraine's football knockout competition since the country's independence.

This edition of the Cup started with a preliminary round of few pairs and three qualification knockout rounds before the first round of the competition. Two legs rounds were extended to the main portion of competition as well as some qualification rounds. Amateur clubs were represented by the winner of Ukrainian Amateur Cup only.

The cup holder Shakhtar Donetsk was eliminated on away goal rule by Metalurh Donetsk in Round of 16.

== Qualification into European Competitions for the 1998–1999 season ==
The winner of this competition qualified as Ukraine's Cup Winner representative in the Cup Winners' Cup and was allowed to enter the competition in the first round.

== Competition schedule ==
=== Preliminary round ===
At this stage in the competition, 20 teams from the Druha Liha and Ukrainian Football Amateur Association entered the competition.

Paperovyk Malyn(2L)	1–2 AET	(2L)Dynamo-3 Kyiv
Tsementnyk Mykolaiv(2L)	3–1	(2L)Naftovyk Dolyna
Pivdenstal Yenakieve(2L)	3–1	(2L)Metalurh Komsomolske
Hazovyk Komarne(2L)	3–1	(2L)Karpaty-2 Lviv
Fortuna Sharhorod(2L)	1–0	(2L)SKA-LOTTO Odesa
Chornomorets Sevastopol(2L)	-:+	(2L)Dynamo Odesa
Domobudivnyk Chernihiv(Am)	1–1 AET, 7–6 (Pen.)	(2L)Dnipro-2 Dnipropetrovsk
Avers Bakhmach(2L)	1–0	(2L)Slovyanets Konotop
Kryvbas-2 Kryvyi Rih(2L)	1–2 AET	(2L)Zirka-NIBAS-2 Kirovohrad
Borysfen Boryspil(2L)	3–0	(2L)Ryhonda Bila Tserkva

=== First qualification round ===
At this stage in the competition, the rest clubs of the Druha Lihaentered the competition.

Dynamo-3 Kyiv(D2)	3–1	Obolon-PPO Kyiv(D2)
Cementnyk Mykolaiv(D2)	1–0 AET	Systema-BOREKS Borodianka(D2)
Pivdenstal Yenekieve(D2)	1–0	Shakhtar Stakhanov(D2)
Nerefa Slavutych(D2)	-:+	Karpaty Mukacheve(D2)
Hazovyk Komarne(D2)	1–0	Halychyna Drohobych(D2)
Krystal Kherson(D2)	3–1	Olimpiya-AES Yuzhnoukrainsk(D2)
Fortuna Sharhorod(D2)	2–1	Lokomotyv Smila(D2)
Pokuttia Kolomyia(D2)	-:+	Kalush(D2)
Haray Zhovkva(D2)	2–1	Nyva Bershad(D2)
Dynamo Odesa(D2)	+:-	Portovyk Illichivsk(D2)
Viktor Zaporizhzhia(D2)	1–2 AET	Torpedo Melitopol
Domobudivnyk Chernihiv(Am)	+:-	Vorskla-2 Poltava(D2)
Shakhtar-2 Donetsk(D2)	3–0	Metalist-2 Kharkiv(D2)
Avers Bakhmach(Am)	1–0	Elektron Romny(D2)
Zirka-NIBAS-2 Kirovohrad(D2)	3–2	Metalurh-2 Donetsk(D2)
Borysfen Boryspil(D2)	0–0 AET, 3–4 (Pen.)	Hirnyk-Sport Komsomolsk(D2)

=== Second qualification round ===
At this stage in the competition, teams play two games, at home and away. Also, clubs of the First League has entered the competition.

Team 1	Agg.	Team 2	1st leg	2nd leg
FC Dynamo-3 Kyiv	7–1	FC Podillya Khmelnytskyi	4–0	3–1
FC Desna Chernihiv	(a) 4–4	FC Tsementnyk Mykolaiv	3–0	1–4
FC Zorya Luhansk	5–1	FC Pivdenstal Yenakieve	1–0	4–1
FC Karpaty Mukacheve	(a) 4–4	FC Veres Rivne	2–1	2–3
FC Hazovyk Komarno	0–1	FC Krystal Chortkiv	0–0	0–1
FC Cherkasy	5–5 (a)	FC Krystal Kherson	2–4	3–1
FC Fortuna Sharhorod	w/o	FC Fakel Varva	+:–	
FC Tysmenytsia	1–2	FC Kalush	0–2	1–0
FC Haray Zhovkva	3–5	FC Polissya Zhytomyr	1–2	2–3
SC Odesa	4–2	FC Dynamo Odesa	3–0	1–2
FC Torpedo Melitopol	3–4	FC Tytan Armyansk	2–2	1–2
FC CSKA-2 Kyiv	3–1	FC Domobudivnyk Chernihiv	1–0	2–1
FC Shakhtar-2 Donetsk	2–4	FC Oskil Kupyansk	1–2	1–2
FC Petrivtsi Myrhorod	1–2	FC Avers Bakhmach	0–2	1–0
FC Zirka-NIBAS-2 Kirovohrad	1–5	FC Avanhard–Industriya Rovenky	0–3	1–2
FC Hirnyk-Sport Komsomolsk	1–2	FC Metalurh Novomoskovsk	0–1	1–1

=== Third qualification round ===
Team 1	Agg.	Team 2	1st leg	2nd leg
FC Dynamo-3 Kyiv	4–2	FC Khimik Severodonetsk	2–1	2–1
FC Desna Chernihiv	3–1	FC Dynamo-2 Kyiv	1–0	2–1
FC Metalist Kharkiv	2–1	FC Zorya Luhansk	2–1	0–0
FC Naftovyk Okhtyrka	6–1	FC Karpaty Mukacheve	4–0	2–1
MFC Mykolaiv	4–0	FC Krystal Chortkiv	3–0	1–0
FC Krystal Kherson	(a) 3–3	FC Polihraftekhnika Oleksandriya	1–0	2–3
FC Kremin Kremenchuk	1–2	FC Fortuna Sharhorod	1–0	0–2
FC Shakhtar Makiivka	4–1	FC Kalush	1–1	3–0
FC Verkhovyna Uzhhorod	2–6	FC Polissya Zhytomyr	2–2	0–4
SC Odesa	0–3	FC Nyva Vinnytsia	0–2	0–1
FC Tytan Armyansk	4–6	FC Bukovyna Chernivtsi	3–1	1–5
FC CSKA-2 Kyiv	(a) 3–3	FC Lviv	0–0	3–3
FC Metalurh Nikopol	w/o	FC Oskil Kupyansk	4–2	+:–
FC Avers Bakhmach	w/o	FC Stal Alchevsk	–:+	
FC Volyn Lutsk	w/o	FC Avanhard–Industriya Rovenky	+:–	
FC Metalurh Novomoskovsk	w/o	FC Yavir Krasnopillia	1–2	–:+

=== Round of 32 ===
The Vyshcha Liha clubs entered the competition.

Team 1	Agg.	Team 2	1st leg	2nd leg
FC Dynamo-3 Kyiv	3–10	FC Dynamo Kyiv	0–5	3–5
FC Metalurh Mariupol	7–6	FC Desna Chernihiv	5–3	2–3
FC Metalist Kharkiv	2–6	FC Chornomorets Odesa	2–2	0–4
FC Naftovyk Okhtyrka	(a) 3–3	FC Zirka–NIBAS Kirovohrad	1–1	2–2
FC Kryvbas Kryvyi Rih	(a) 3–3	MFC Mykolaiv	2–0	1–3 (a.e.t.)
FC Krystal Kherson	2–8	FC Karpaty Lviv	1–4	1–4
FC Torpedo Zaporizhzhia	4–1	FC Fortuna Sharhorod	3–0	1–1
FC Shakhtar Makiivka	2–5	FC Vorskla Poltava	1–2	1–3
FC Polissya Zhytomyr	1–2	FC Dnipro Dnipropetrovsk	1–0	0–2
FC Prykarpattia Ivano-Frankivsk	2–2 (2–4 p)	FC Nyva Vinnytsia	2–0	0–2 (a.e.t.)
FC Bukovyna Chernivtsi	0–3	SC Tavriya Simferopol	0–2	0–1
FC CSKA-2 Kyiv	4–5	FC CSKA Kyiv	2–4	2–1
FC Nyva Ternopil	5–1	FC Metalurh Nikopol	4–0	1–1
FC Stal Alchevsk	0–1	FC Metalurh Zaporizhzhia	0–0	0–1
FC Volyn Lutsk	1–2	FC Metalurh Donetsk	0–0	1–2
FC Yavir Krasnopillia	3–6	FC Shakhtar Donetsk	3–3	0–3

=== Round of 16 ===
Team 1	Agg.	Team 2	1st leg	2nd leg
FC Naftovyk Okhtyrka	3–5	FC Chornomorets Odesa	3–0	0–5
FC Kryvbas Kryvyi Rih	2–2 (4–3 p)	FC Karpaty Lviv	2–0	0–2 (a.e.t.)
FC Torpedo Zaporizhzhia	0–1	FC Vorskla Poltava	0–1	0–0
FC Nyva Vinnytsia	1–3	FC Dnipro Dnipropetrovsk	1–1	0–2
FC CSKA Kyiv	2–1	SC Tavriya Simferopol	2–0	0–1
FC Metalurh Zaporizhzhia	3–4	FC Nyva Ternopil	2–1	1–3
FC Metalurh Donetsk	(a) 3–3	FC Shakhtar Donetsk	2–0	1–3
FC Dynamo Kyiv	4–0	FC Metalurh Mariupol	3–0	1–0

==== First leg ====
9 March 1998	Naftovyk Okhtyrka (1L)	3–0	(PL) Chornomorets Odesa	Naftovyk Stadium, Okhtyrka
	Artyomenko 52'; Zakharov 60'; Okhrimenko 70'	Report		Attendance: 3,000; Referee: Vasyl Melnychuk

9 March 1998	Kryvbas Kryvyi Rih (PL)	2–0	(PL) Karpaty Lviv	Metalurh Stadium, Kryvyi Rih
	Rymshyn 44'; Moroz 81'	Report		Attendance: 20,000; Referee: Anatoliy Zhosan

9 March 1998	Torpedo Zaporizhzhia (PL)	0–1	(PL) Vorskla Poltava	Lokomotyv Stadium, Zaporizhzhia
		Report	Kyslov 43'	Attendance: 3,000; Referee: Hennadiy Kovalenko

9 March 1998	Nyva Vinnytsia (1L)	1–1	(PL) Dnipro Dnipropetrovsk	Tsentralnyi Stadion, Vinnytsia
	Finkel 68'	Report	Sidelnikov 47'	Attendance: 8,000; Referee: Ihor Yarmenchuk

9 March 1998	CSKA Kyiv (PL)	2–0	(PL) Tavriya Simferopol	CSK ZSU Stadium, Kyiv
	Horodov 26'; Hohil 67'	Report		Attendance: 2,000; Referee: Ihor Horozhankin

9 March 1998	Metalurh Zaporizhzhia (PL)	2–1	(PL) Nyva Ternopil	Metalurh Stadium, Zaporizhzhia
	Kolodin 33'; Lypskyi 58'	Report	Kapanadze 42'	Attendance: 3,500; Referee: Vadym Shelmenko

9 March 1998	Metalurh Donetsk (PL)	2–0	(PL) Shakhtar Donetsk	Avanhard Stadium, Dokuchaievsk
	Luchkevych 48'; Sevidov 79'	Report		Attendance: 5,000; Referee: Anatoliy Aranovskyi

11 March 1998	Dynamo Kyiv (PL)	3–0	(PL) Metalurh Mariupol	Dynamo Stadium, Kyiv
	Rebrov 16'; Shevchenko 68'; Kosovskyi 86'	Report		Attendance: 2,000; Referee: Vasyl Babych

==== Second leg ====
13 March 1998	Chornomorets Odesa (PL)	5–0	(1L) Naftovyk Okhtyrka	Black Sea Shipping, Odesa
	Huseynov 21'; Syarohin 30', 33'; Shutov 42'; Mhlynets 43'	Report		Attendance: 5,000; Referee: Volodymyr Kutsev

Chornomorets won 5–3 on aggregate.

13 March 1998	Karpaty Lviv (PL)	2–0 (a.e.t.) (3–4 p)	(PL) Kryvbas Kryvyi Rih	Ukraina Stadium, Lviv
	Mizin 18'; Hetsko 87'	Report		Attendance: 8,000; Referee: Viktor Derdo

2–2 on aggregate. Kryvbas won 4–3 on penalty kicks.

13 March 1998	Vorskla Poltava (PL)	0–0	(PL) Torpedo Zaporizhzhia	Vorskla Stadium, Poltava
		Report		Attendance: 4,000; Referee: Serhiy Dzyuba

Vorskla won 1–0 on aggregate.

=== Quarter-finals ===
Team 1	Agg.	Team 2	1st leg	2nd leg
FC Dynamo Kyiv	7–1	FC Chornomorets Odesa	3–0	4–1
FC Kryvbas Kryvyi Rih	2–1	FC Vorskla Poltava	2–1	0–0
FC Dnipro Dnipropetrovsk	1–2	FC CSKA Kyiv	0–1	1–1 (a.e.t.)
FC Nyva Ternopil	2–2 (a)	FC Metalurh Donetsk	2–1	0–1

==== First leg ====
10 April 1998	Dynamo Kyiv (PL)	3–0	(PL) Chornomorets Odesa	Dynamo Stadium, Kyiv
	Shevchenko 13'; Gerasimenko 40'; Rebrov 72'	Report		Attendance: 7,000; Referee: Vasyl Melnychuk

10 April 1998	Kryvbas Kryvyi Rih (PL)	2–1	(PL) Vorskla Poltava	Metalurh Stadium, Kryvyi Rih
	Hashchyn 37'; Rymshyn 40'; Simakov (yellow card) 13' (yellow-red card) 82'	Report	Antyukhin 52'; Machohan (yellow card) 55' (yellow-red card) 84'	Attendance: 12,000; Referee: Ihor Horozhankin

10 April 1998	Dnipro Dnipropetrovsk (PL)	0–1	(PL) CSKA Kyiv	Meteor Stadium, Dnipropetrovsk
		Report	Malimon 17'	Attendance: 2,500; Referee: Ihor Ishchenko

10 April 1998	Nyva Ternopil (PL)	2–1	(PL) Metalurh Donetsk	Ternopil City Stadium, Ternopil
	Kapanadze 1', 55'	Report	Datsenko 56'	Attendance: 5,000; Referee: Ihor Yarmenchuk

==== Second leg ====
24 April 1998	Chornomorets Odesa (PL)	1–4	(PL) Dynamo Kyiv	ChMP Stadium, Odesa
	Skoropad 37'	Report	Shevchenko 24'; Rebrov 35', 52'; Gerasimenko 50'	Attendance: 6,000; Referee: Anatoliy Zhosan

Dynamo won 7–1 on aggregate.

24 April 1998	Vorskla Poltava (PL)	0–0	(PL) Kryvbas Kryvyi Rih	Vorskla Stadium, Poltava
		Report		Attendance: 6,000; Referee: Serhiy Tatulyan

Kryvbas won 2–1 on aggregate.

24 April 1998	CSKA Kyiv (PL)	1–1 (a.e.t.)	(PL) Dnipro Dnipropetrovsk	CSK ZSU Stadium, Kyiv
	Oliynyk 117'	Report	Suharev 31'	Attendance: 3,500; Referee: Ihor Khiblin

CSKA won 2–1 on aggregate.

24 April 1998	Metalurh Donetsk (PL)	1–0	(PL) Nyva Ternopil	im. 125-richia DMZ, Donetsk
	Korol 37'	Report		Attendance: 3,000; Referee: Viktor Derdo

2–2 on aggregate. Metalurh won on away goal rule.

=== Semi-finals ===
Team 1	Agg.	Team 2	1st leg	2nd leg
FC Kryvbas Kryvyi Rih	2–5	FC Dynamo Kyiv	2–4	0–1
FC CSKA Kyiv	4–2	FC Metalurh Donetsk	1–1	3–1

==== First leg ====
6 May 1998	Kryvbas Kryvyi Rih (PL)	2–4	(PL) Dynamo Kyiv	Metalurh Stadium, Kryvyi Rih
	Shyshchenko 28'; Rymshyn 85'	Report	Kaladze 21'; Rebrov 50'; Shevchenko 70'; Husin 82'	Attendance: 36,000; Referee: Vasyl Babych

6 May 1998	CSKA Kyiv (PL)	1–1	(PL) Metalurh Donetsk	CSK ZSU Stadium, Kyiv
	Tsykhmeistruk 78'	Report	Datsenko 2'	Attendance: 6,500; Referee: Viktor Derdo

==== Second leg ====
14 May 1998	Dynamo Kyiv (PL)	1–0	(PL) Kryvbas Kryvyi Rih	Dynamo Stadium, Kyiv
	Rebrov 41'	Report		Attendance: 4,000; Referee: Anatoliy Zhosan

Dynamo won 5–2 on aggregate.

14 May 1998	Metalurh Donetsk (PL)	1–3	(PL) CSKA Kyiv	im. 125-richia DMZ, Donetsk
	Pokladok 58'	Report	Tsykhmeistruk 21'; Kripak 66', 81'; Ulianytskyi (yellow card) 60' (yellow-red card) 83'	Attendance: 3,000; Referee: Ihor Horozhankin

CSKA won 4–2 on aggregate.

=== Final ===
1998-05-31
?:? LST

Dynamo Kyiv	2–1	CSKA Kyiv
Shevchenko 1', 33'	Report	(penalty missed) 62' Oliynyk; 65' Novokhatskyi

NSC Olimpiyskiy, Kyiv
Attendance: 43,500
Referee: Ihor Yarmenchuk (Kyiv), (FIFA)

== See also ==
- 1997–98 Vyshcha Liha
