= Yuriy Martynov =

Ukrainian football player (born 1965)

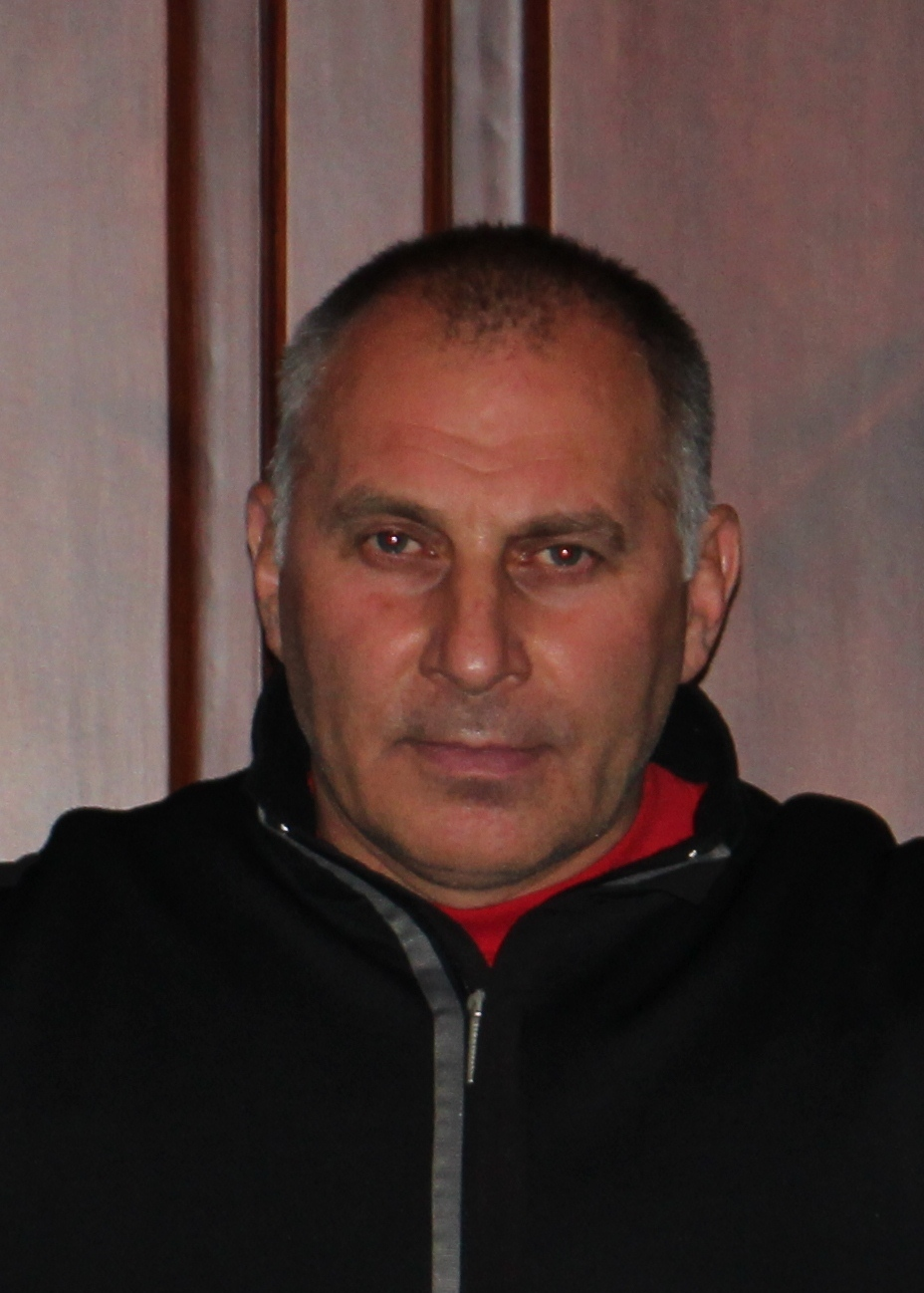

Personal information
- Full name: Yuriy Petrovych Martynov
- Date of birth: 5 June 1965 (age 61)
- Place of birth: Kherson Oblast, Ukrainian SSR
- Height: 1.80 m (5 ft 11 in)
- Position: Forward

Youth career
- 1980s: Kherson sports school

Senior career*
Years	Team	Apps	(Gls)
1983	FC Krystal Kherson	20	(0)
1986–1989	FC Krystal Kherson	136	(35)
1990	FC Naftovyk Okhtyrka	1	(0)
1990	FC Meliorator Kakhovka	11	(4)
1991–1992	Warta Poznań		
1992	FC Meliorator Kakhovka	6	(1)
1992–1993	FC Sirius Zhovti Vody	15	(25)
1994–1999	FC Zirka Kirovohrad	136	(32)
1996	→ SC Mykolaiv	20	(6)
1998	→ FC Zirka-2 Kirovohrad	2	(0)
2000	FC Naftovyk Okhtyrka	28	(4)

International career
1995	Ukraine	1	(0)

Managerial career
- 2005–2006: FC Krystal Kherson
- 2009–2010: FC Krystal Kherson
- * Club domestic league appearances and goals

Yuriy Martynov (Ukrainian: Юрій Петрович Мартинов; born 5 June 1965) is a Soviet and Ukrainian former professional football player.
