= Vasyl Novokhatskyi =

Ukrainian footballer (born 1974)

Vasyl Novokhatskyi Василь Новохацький
Personal information
- Full name: Vasyl Novokhatskyi
- Date of birth: 24 September 1974 (age 52)
- Place of birth: Kalynivka, Soviet Union
- Height: 1.80 m (5 ft 11 in)
- Position: Midfielder

Senior career*
Years	Team	Apps	(Gls)
1992	Nyva Vinnytsia	8	(0)
1993–1994	CSKA Kyiv	52	(9)
1995	CSKA-Borysfen Kyiv	11	(3)
1995–1996	Ionikos	31	(10)
1996–1997	Maccabi Haifa	9	(0)
1997–1998	Panachaiki	25	(4)
1998–1999	CSKA Kyiv	7	(0)
1998–1999	→ CSKA-2 Kyiv	15	(1)
2001–2002	Chania		
2010–2011	SC Kalynivka	11	(1)
- * Club domestic league appearances and goals

Vasyl Novokhatskyi (Ukrainian: Василь Новохацький; born 24 September 1974) is a retired footballer who played as a midfielder for clubs in Ukraine, Greece, and Israel. His last name often is misspelled as Novohatsky (Ukrainian: Новогацький), because of a transliteration inconsistency.

== Club career ==
Novokhatskyi began playing football for Ukrainian Premier League side PFC Nyva Vinnytsia. Soon, he joined FC CSKA Kyiv, and would score a goal as the club lost the 1997–98 Ukrainian Cup final.

In July 1995, Novokhatskyi joined Super League Greece side Ionikos F.C. for the one season. He spent the following season with Maccabi Haifa F.C. before returning to Greece to play for Panachaiki for one season.

He played for Greek third division side AO Chania F.C. during the 2001–02 season.
