= Oleksandr Hranovskyi (footballer) =

Ukrainian footballer

Personal information
- Full name: Oleksandr Hranovskyi
- Date of birth: 11 March 1976 (age 50)
- Place of birth: Odesa, Ukrainian SSR
- Height: 1.79 m (5 ft 10 1/2 in)
- Position: Defender

Senior career*
| Years | Team | Apps | (Gls) |
| 1992–1996 | Chornomorets Odesa | 0 | (0) |
| 1992–1995 | → Chornomorets-2 Odesa | 85 | (5) |
| 1995–1996 | → Naftokhimik Kremenchuk (loan) | 33 | (1) |
| 1996 | Nyva Vinnytsia | 9 | (0) |
| 1997 | Tiligul Tiraspol | 21 | (1) |
| 1997–2000 | Kryvbas Kryvyi Rih | 76 | (1) |
| 2001 | Spartak Moscow | 8 | (1) |
| 2001 | Karpaty Lviv | 5 | (0) |
| 2002 | Rubin Kazan | 1 | (0) |
| 2002–2003 | Kryvbas Kryvyi Rih | 32 | (0) |
| 2004 | Metalist Kharkiv | 17 | (0) |
| 2005 | Kharkiv | 29 | (0) |
| 2006 | Slavia Prague | 0 | (0) |
| 2006 | Dnipro Cherkasy | 19 | (0) |
| 2007–2009 | Kryvbas Kryvyi Rih | 39 | (0) |

International career
| 2001 | Ukraine | 3 | (0) |

Managerial career
- 2012–2013: Kryvbas Kryvyi Rih U-21
- 2014: Mykolaiv (assistant)
- 2015–2017: Chornomorets Odesa (assistant)
- 2017: Chornomorets Odesa (caretaker)
- 2017: Chornomorets Odesa (assistant)
- 2018: BATE Borisov (assistant)
- 2019: Belarus U19 (assistant)
- 2019: Atyrau (assistant)
- 2020: Hapoel Nof HaGalil U19
- 2020–2021: Hapoel Nof HaGalil U19 (assistant)
- 2021: Hapoel Nof HaGalil U19
- 2021–2023: Lviv (assistant)
- 2023–2024: LNZ Cherkasy (assistant)
- 2025: Hapoel Afula (assistant)
- 2025–2026: Hapoel Afula
- * Club domestic league appearances and goals

Oleksandr Hranovskyi (Ukrainian: Олександр Анатолійович Грановський; born 11 March 1976) is a retired professional Ukrainian football international defender.

== Career ==
He joined Kryvbas in 1998. Hranovskyi captained Kryvbas 19 times. He was the finalist of Ukrainian Championship in 2000. He also participated 23 times in the Ukrainian Cup and 6 times in the UEFA Europa League.
