= Viktor Derdo =

Ukrainian football referee

- Full name: Viktor Hryhorovych Derdo
- Born: 12 April 1954 (age 72); Berezivka, Odesa Oblast, Ukraine SSR

Domestic
Years	League	Role
1992-2000	Ukrainian Premier League	Referee
Years		Role

Viktor Hryhorovych Derdo (Ukrainian: Віктор Григорович Дердо, born 12 April 1954 in Berezivka, Odesa Oblast, Ukraine) is a former Ukrainian professional football referee.

He is the father of another Ukrainian football referee Oleksandr Derdo.
