= Oleksandr Radchenko =

Ukrainian footballer (1976–2023)

Personal information
- Full name: Oleksandr Borysovych Radchenko
- Date of birth: 19 July 1976
- Place of birth: Zhdanov, Soviet Union (now Mariupol, Ukraine)
- Date of death: 7 February 2023 (aged 46)
- Height: 1.76 m (5 ft 9 in)
- Position: Left-back

Youth career
- Azovets Mariupol

Senior career*
Years	Team	Apps	(Gls)
1993–1997	Metalurh Mariupol	146	(4)
1997–2002	Dynamo Kyiv	23	(1)
1997–2002	→ Dynamo-2 Kyiv	121	(4)
1997–2001	→ Dynamo-3 Kyiv	7	(0)
2001–2002	→ Zakarpattia Uzhhorod (loan)	26	(0)
2002–2006	Dnipro Dnipropetrovsk	87	(2)
2007–2009	Kryvbas Kryvyi Rih	27	(1)
2009	Volyn Lutsk	0	(0)
2010	Nove Zhyttia Andriivka		

International career
1997	Ukraine U21	2	(0)
2002–2005	Ukraine	17	(0)
- * Club domestic league appearances and goals

Oleksandr Borysovych Radchenko (Ukrainian: Олександр Борисович Радченко; 19 July 1976 – 7 February 2023) was a Ukrainian professional footballer who played as a left-back.

== Career ==
Radchenko was born in present-day Mariupol, Ukraine. His career started with Azovets Mariupol in 1993. In 1995, the team became FC Metalurg Mariupol. He then debuted in the Vyscha Liha when he transferred to Dynamo Kyiv in a match versus Torpedo Zaporizhzhia on 9 July 1997. He played at Dynamo Kyiv from 1997 to 2003, going out on loan to Zakarpatiia Uzhhorod in 2001. In 2003, he transferred to Dnipro Dnipropetrovsk before finishing his career with Kryvbas Kryvyi Rih and Volyn Lutsk.

Radchenko made 17 appearances for the Ukraine national team from 2002 to 2005.

== Death ==
Radchenko died on 7 February 2023, at the age of 46.
