= Roman Pets =

Ukrainian footballer (born 1969)

Personal information
- Full name: Roman Vasylyovych Pets
- Date of birth: 21 June 1969 (age 57)
- Place of birth: Kharkiv, Soviet Union (now Ukraine)
- Height: 1.85 m (6 ft 1 in)
- Position: Defender

Senior career*
Years	Team	Apps	(Gls)
1986–1989	Mayak Kharkiv	79	(0)
1990–1993	Metalist Kharkiv	81	(2)
1993–1995	Maccabi Haifa	54	(1)
1996–1997	Hapoel Tsafririm Holon	42	(0)
1997–1998	Chornomorets Odesa	24	(0)
1998–2004	Metalist Kharkiv	119	(6)
1998–2003	→ Metalist-2 Kharkiv	16	(1)
- * Club domestic league appearances and goals

Roman Vasylyovych Pets (born 21 June 1969) is a Ukrainian retired professional footballer who played as a defender for Metalist Kharkiv in Ukraine and Maccabi Haifa in Israel.

== Career ==
Pets began playing football at the age of 9 at a sports boarding school in the city of Kharkiv. At first his coaches assigned him the role of forward, but after failing to do so he switched to play as a central defender. In 1990 he moved to the Metalist Kharkiv, playing in the Soviet Top League and then the Ukrainian Premier League. In 1993, Pets came to Israel and signed with Maccabi Haifa. Pets is best remembered for his 25-yard goal against Torpedo Moscow in the Holders' Cup.

He has played a major role during the 1993–94 season helping Maccabi Haifa go on and win the Israeli Premier League championship without losing a single game. Towards the end of the season, during a game against Maccabi Tel Aviv, he was controversially fouled by Meir Melika and broke his ankle, After a long absence, he returned to play but did not reach his pre-injury level.

In the 1995–96 season, he was loaned to Hapoel Tsafririm Holon, until 1997 until he finally left Israel.

In 1997, he returned to Ukraine, first to Chornomorets Odesa and then to Metalist Kharkiv where he ended his career as a player in 2004.

== Personal life ==
His son Ivan Pets is also a professional footballer.

== Honours ==
Maccabi Haifa

- Israeli Premier League: 1993–94
- Israeli Cup: 1994–95
