= Vasyl Kardash =

Ukrainian footballer (born 1973)

Vasyl Kardash Василь Кардаш
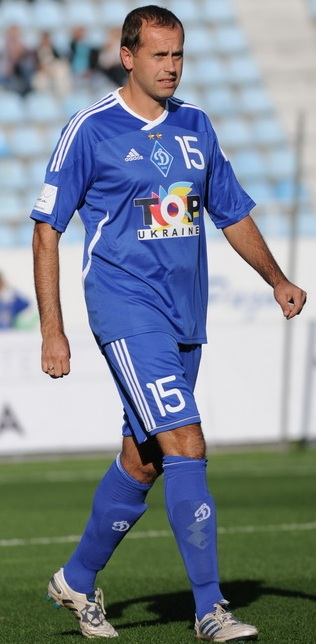

Personal information
- Full name: Vasyl Yaroslavovych Kardash
- Date of birth: 14 January 1973 (age 53)
- Place of birth: Lviv, Soviet Union (now Ukraine)
- Height: 1.85 m (6 ft 1 in)
- Position: Defender

Team information
- Current team: FC Kulykiv-Bilka (Sporting Director)

Youth career
- DYuSSh Stryi
- SDYuShOR Karpaty Lviv

Senior career*
Years	Team	Apps	(Gls)
1990	Karpaty Lviv	4	(1)
1991–1993	Karpaty Kamianka-Buzka/Skala Stryi	36	(17)
1993–1994	Karpaty Lviv	39	(8)
1994–1995	Maccabi Haifa	8	(2)
1995–1996	Chornomorets Odesa	45	(9)
1997–2003	Dynamo Kyiv	56	(6)
1996–2002	→ Dynamo-2 Kyiv	68	(4)
1998–2000	→ Dynamo-3 Kyiv	5	(0)
2003–2006	Arsenal Kyiv	31	(1)
2007	Zakarpattia Uzhhorod	3	(0)
2008–2009	Irpin Horenychi (amateurs)	2	(0)
2014	Yevrobis-Ahrobiznes Kyiv (amateurs)		
Total		297	(48)

International career
1994–1995	Ukraine U21	7	(0)
1996–2001	Ukraine	14	(0)

Managerial career
- 2010–2013: Dynamo-2 Kyiv (assistant)
- 2016-2019: Ukraine U21 (assistant)
- 2022-2024: Dinaz Vyshhorod (assistant)
- 2023: Ukraine (assistant)
- 2023-2024: Ukraine U23 (assistant)
- 2025-: Kulykiv-Bilka (sporting director)
- * Club domestic league appearances and goals

Vasyl Yaroslavovych Kardash (Ukrainian: Василь Ярославович Кардаш; born 14 January 1973) is a Ukrainian former professional footballer who played as a defender.

== Career ==
A native of Lviv, Kardash began his career at the sports schools in Stryi and Lviv. His first coach was Andriy Karimov.

His professional level debut Kardash has made at 17 during the 1990 Soviet Second League, when he played for FC Karpaty Lviv. Next season, he was sent to Karpaty from Kamianka-Buzka, which played a tier down in 1991 Soviet Lower Second League. Following the independence of Ukraine and reorganization of football competitions in Ukraine, Karpaty moved to Stryi and reorganized as Skala Stryi in memory of the earlier Ukrainian Sports Club Skala Stryi, which competed in Polish football competitions before World War II. After a couple of seasons in the Ukrainian First League (tier 2), Kardash returned to Karpaty Lviv. He made his debut in the Vyshcha Liha (tier 1) on 14 March 1993 in an away match against Shakhtar Donetsk, which ended in a scoreless tie. On 18 August 1993, Kardash made his debut in European competitions after Karpaty qualified for the 1993–94 UEFA Cup Winners' Cup. In the qualification rounds, they were eliminated by Shelbourne F.C.

In 1994, Kardash signed with Maccabi Haifa F.C., with which he made his debut in the UEFA Champions League. Maccabi was playing the Austrian Casino Salzburg in the qualifications of the 1994–95 UEFA Champions League. They lost both legs of the match-up.

In 1995, Kardash returned to Ukraine, signing with Chornomorets Odesa.

In 1996, He signed with Dynamo Kyiv. Kardash remained with Dynamo until 2003, when he signed with their main Kyiv city rivals Arsenal Kyiv.

=== International career ===
Kardash made his international debut for the Ukraine national U-21 team on 30 March 1994 in an away friendly against the Slovakia U-21 team.

On 9 April 1996, Kardash played his first game for the Ukraine national team, where in an away game against Moldova national team, Ukraine earned a 2:2 tie after being 2 goals up.

Kardash played 14 games for the Ukraine national team.

== Honours ==
=== Player ===
Maccabi Haifa

- Liga Leumit (1): 1993–94

Chornomorets Odesa

- Vyshcha Liha runner-up: 1994–95, 1995–96

Dynamo Kyiv

- Vyshcha Liha (5): 1996–97, 1997–98, 1998–99, 1999–00, 2000–01
- Ukrainian Cup (3): 1997–98, 1998–99, 1999–00
