= Valeriy Onufer =

Ukrainian football referee

- Full name: Valeriy Heorhievych Onufer
- Born: 10 February 1954; Uzhhorod, Ukrainian SSR, Soviet Union
- Died: 21 February 2011 (aged 57); Uzhhorod, Ukraine

Domestic
Years	League	Role
1991	Soviet Top League	Referee
1992–2003	Ukrainian Premier League	Referee

International
Years	League	Role
1998	FIFA listed	Referee

Valeriy Heorhievych Onufer (Валерій Георгійович Онуфер, 10 February 1954 – 12 February 2011) was a Ukrainian football referee.

He was a referee at the Euro 2000 qualification match between San Marino and Austria that took place on 14 October 1998 in Serravalle, San Marino.
