= Oleksandr Kyryukhin =

Ukrainian footballer

Oleksandr Kiryukhin
Personal information
- Full name: Oleksandr Hryhorovych Kiryukhin
- Date of birth: 1 October 1974 (age 52)
- Place of birth: Nikopol, Dnipropetrovsk Oblast, Ukrainian SSR
- Height: 1.76 m (5 ft 9 1/2 in)
- Positions: Defender; midfielder

Senior career*
Years	Team	Apps	(Gls)
1991–1995	Metalurh Nikopol	113	(4)
1995	Zorya-MALS Luhansk	1	(0)
1995–1996	Metalurh Nikopol	19	(0)
1996–1997	Uralan Elista	77	(6)
1998–1999	Dynamo Kyiv	20	(1)
1998–1999	→ Dynamo-2 Kyiv	53	(0)
1999–2000	→ Dynamo-3 Kyiv	6	(0)
2000	Krylia Sovetov Samara	24	(0)
2000	→ Krylia Sovetov-2 Samara	2	(0)
2000–2001	Kryvbas Kryvyi Rih	9	(0)
2001	Chernomorets Novorossiysk	11	(0)
2002	Dynamo Saint Petersburg	15	(1)
2003	SKA-Energiya Khabarovsk	34	(0)
2003–2004	Zorya Luhansk	19	(0)
2005–2006	Borysfen Boryspil	13	(0)

International career
1999	Ukraine	2	(0)
- * Club domestic league appearances and goals

Oleksandr Hryhorovych Kiryukhin (Ukrainian: Олександр Григорович Кiрюхін; Russian: Александр Григорьевич Кирюхин; born 1 October 1974) is a retired Ukrainian professional footballer.

== Honours ==
- Ukrainian Premier League champion: 1998, 1999, 2000.

== European club competitions ==
- 1998–99 UEFA Champions League with FC Dynamo Kyiv: 4 games.
- 2001–02 UEFA Cup with FC Chernomorets Novorossiysk: 1 game.
