= Yuriy Dmytrulin =

Ukrainian footballer

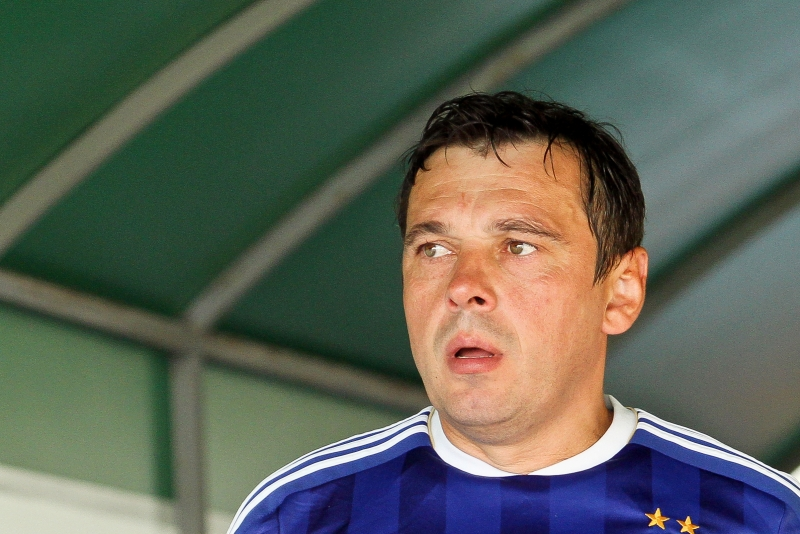

Personal information
- Full name: Yuriy Mykhaylovych Dmytrulin
- Date of birth: 10 February 1975 (age 51)
- Place of birth: Snihurivka, Ukrainian SSR
- Height: 1.75 m (5 ft 9 in)
- Position: Defender

Youth career
- Kyiv sport-school
- Dynamo Kyiv Academy

Senior career*
Years	Team	Apps	(Gls)
1992–2005	FC Dynamo Kyiv	221	(6)
1992–1999	→ FC Dynamo-3 Kyiv	14	(0)
1993–2004	→ FC Dynamo-2 Kyiv	90	(2)
2005	→ SC Tavriya Simferopol (loan)	12	(0)
2006	FC Shinnik Yaroslavl	6	(0)
2006	FC Dynamo Kyiv	0	(0)
2006	→ FC Dynamo-2 Kyiv	5	(0)
2008	FC Yednist' Plysky	12	(0)

International career
1996–2004	Ukraine	39	(1)
- * Club domestic league appearances and goals as of 1 January 2009

Yuriy Mykhaylovych Dmytrulin (Ukrainian: Юрiй Михайлович Дмитрулін; Russian: Юрий Михайлович Дмитрулин; born 10 February 1975) is a retired Ukrainian professional footballer (defender).

== Career ==
Dmytrulin was born on 10 February 1975 in the city of Snihurivka, at the time part of the Ukrainian SSR of the Soviet Union (in the Mykolaiv Oblast of present-day Ukraine).

He was a versatile full-back for Dynamo Kyiv since 1992 and one of the leading defenders in Ukraine along with Oleksandr Holovko, Vladyslav Vaschuk, and others. During his stay in the club Dmytrulin became a nine-times champion of Ukraine, while raising the national cup over his head six times. He was instrumental for Dynamo Kyiv to reach semi-finals of the Champion's League in 1999. Dmytrulin also capped nearly 40 games for the national side, debuting on 13 August 1996 in the game against Lithuania. His single goal came on 5 June 1999 in the game against Andorra (4:0) during the UEFA Euro 2000 qualifying campaign.

After retiring from the professional football in 2008, Dmytrulin continued to play for short while in amateurs, particularly for FC Irpin Horenychi (Kyiv Oblast) that managed to win the national amateur cup in 2008.

== Career statistics ==
=== International goals ===
No.	Date	Venue	Opponent	Score	Result	Competition
1	5 June 1999	Olimpiyskiy National Sports Complex, Kyiv, Ukraine	Andorra	3–0	4–0	UEFA Euro 2000 qualifying

== Honours ==
- Ukrainian Premier League champion: 1995, 1996, 1997, 1998, 1999, 2000, 2001, 2003, 2004.
- Ukrainian Cup winner: 1993, 1996, 1998, 1999, 2000, 2003, 2005.
- Ukrainian Super Cup winner: 2004
- Five times was selected to the Ukrainian Best-33, a fantasy team of the best performers for a past season.
