= Sergei Kormiltsev =

Russian-Ukrainian footballer

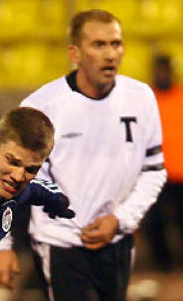

Personal information
- Full name: Sergei Gennadyevich Kormiltsev
- Date of birth: 22 January 1974 (age 52)
- Place of birth: Barnaul, Russian SFSR
- Height: 1.85 m (6 ft 1 in)
- Positions: Midfielder; striker

Senior career*
Years	Team	Apps	(Gls)
1991–1993	Dynamo Barnaul	48	(9)
1994–1996	Zarya Leninsk-Kuznetsky	109	(23)
1997–1998	Uralan Elista	58	(12)
1999–2000	Dynamo Kyiv	29	(1)
1999–2000	→ Dynamo-2 Kyiv	35	(1)
1999	→ Dynamo-3 Kyiv	2	(0)
2000–2006	Torpedo Moscow	161	(9)
2000	→ Torpedo-d Moscow	1	(0)
2007	Zorya Luhansk	3	(0)
2008	Dynamo Barnaul	25	(0)
Total		471	(55)

International career
1998	Russia	1	(0)
2000–2004	Ukraine	15	(0)

Managerial career
- 2009–2010: FC Dynamo Barnaul (assistant)
- 2014–2015: FC Metallurg Novokuznetsk (assistant)
- 2015–2016: FC Baikal Irkutsk (assistant)
- 2017–2018: FC Chita (assistant)
- * Club domestic league appearances and goals

Sergei Gennadyevich Kormiltsev (Russian: Серге́й Геннадьевич Кормильцев; born 22 January 1974) is a Russian and Ukrainian football coach and a former player.

== Honours ==
- Ukrainian Premier League winner: 1999, 2000.
- Ukrainian Cup winner: 1999, 2000.

== International career ==
Kormiltsev made his debut for Russia on 18 November 1998 in a friendly against Brazil. After moving to play in Ukraine, he started to play for Ukraine national team and won 15 caps.

He was one of the players and coaches named by Professional Football League on 1 September 2010 as making bets on their own team's results. He was fired by the team shortly after.
