= Vyacheslav Kernozenko =

Ukrainian footballer

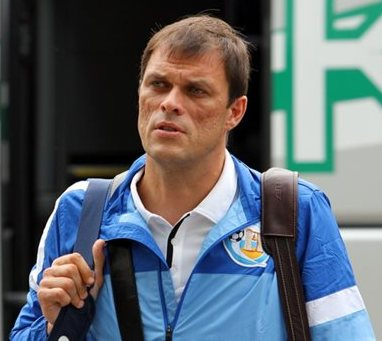
- Kernozenko in 2013

Personal information
- Full name: Vyacheslav Serhiyovych Kernozenko
- Date of birth: 4 June 1976 (age 50)
- Place of birth: Havana, Cuba
- Height: 1.84 m (6 ft 0 in)
- Position: Goalkeeper

Team information
- Current team: Kolos Kovalivka (goalkeeper coach)

Senior career*
Years	Team	Apps	(Gls)
1993–2001	Dynamo Kyiv	32	(0)
1993–2001	→ Dynamo-2 Kyiv	164	(0)
1997–1998	→ Dynamo-3 Kyiv	3	(0)
2001–2003	Arsenal Kyiv	61	(0)
2003	→ Arsenal-2 Kyiv	2	(0)
2004–2009	Dnipro Dnipropetrovsk	97	(0)
2009	→ Kryvbas Kryvyi Rih (loan)	5	(0)
Total		364	(0)

International career
1996–1997	Ukraine U21	8	(0)
2000–2008	Ukraine	5	(0)

Managerial career
- 2010–2011: Dynamo Kyiv (youth)
- 2011–2012: Vostok (goalkeeping coach)
- 2012–2014: Sevastopol (goalkeeping coach)
- 2016–2017: Dnipro (U19 goalkeeping coach)
- 2017–: Kolos Kovalivka (goalkeeping coach)
- 2019: Ukraine U20 (goalkeeping coach)
- 2021–2023: Ukraine (goalkeeping coach)
- * Club domestic league appearances and goals

Vyacheslav Serhiyovych Kernozenko (Ukrainian: В'ячеслав Сергійович Кернозенко; born 4 June 1976) is a former professional footballer who played as a goalkeeper and current assistant manager. In 2019, he was a member of the Petrakov's coaching staff for the Ukraine U-20 that became the world champions, for which Ruzhentsev was honored with title "Honored state functionary of physical culture and sport of Ukraine". Born in Cuba, he represented Ukraine internationally.

== International career ==
He played for Ukraine national under-21 football team. He also was called up to Ukraine national football team for the first time on 15 November 1997 for match against Croatia, but first match spent on 31 May 2000 against England. Last, 5th match, for National representation he played 24 May 2008 in match against Netherlands. Kernozenko was also eligible to represent Cuba internationally. His parents were Ukrainian immigrants.

== Honours ==
- Ukrainian Premier League: champion 1997, 1998, 1999, 2000
- Ukrainian Cup: winner 1998, 1999, 2000; runner-up 2004
