= Andriy Husin =

Ukrainian footballer and coach (1972–2014)

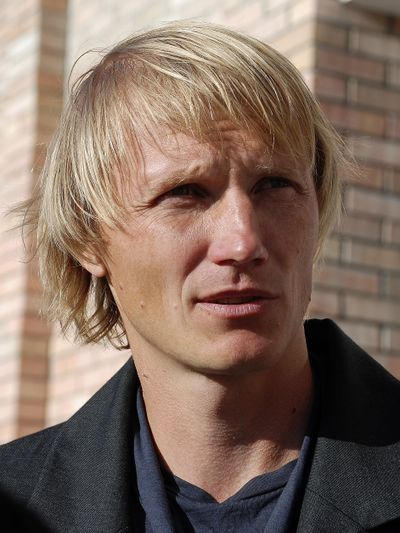
- Husin in 2011

Personal information
- Full name: Andriy Leonidovych Husin
- Date of birth: 11 December 1972
- Place of birth: Zolochiv, Ukrainian SSR (now Ukraine)
- Date of death: 17 September 2014 (aged 41)
- Place of death: Kyiv, Ukraine
- Height: 1.89 m (6 ft 2 in)
- Position: Defensive midfielder

Senior career*
Years	Team	Apps	(Gls)
1991	Avanhard Zhydachiv		(13)
1991	Karpaty Kamianka-Buzka	2	(0)
1992	Hazovyk Komarno	16	(3)
1992–1993	Karpaty Lviv	17	(4)
1993–2005	Dynamo Kyiv	170	(22)
1994–2004	→ Dynamo-2 Kyiv	82	(36)
1995–1996	→ CSKA-Borysfen Kyiv (loan)	27	(9)
2001	→ Dynamo-3 Kyiv	1	(0)
2005–2007	Krylia Sovetov	39	(9)
2008	Saturn Ramenskoye	13	(0)
2009	Khimki	0	(0)
Total		367+	(96)

International career
1993–2006	Ukraine	71	(9)

Managerial career
- 2007–2008: Saturn Ramenskoye (assistant)
- 2010: Anzhi Makhachkala (assistant)
- 2010–2013: Dynamo-2 Kyiv
- 2013: Krylia Sovetov Samara (assistant)
- 2013–2014: Anzhi Makhachkala (assistant)
- * Club domestic league appearances and goals

Andriy Leonidovych Husin (Ukrainian: Андрій Леонідович Гусін; 11 December 1972 – 17 September 2014) was a Ukrainian professional football player and coach. He played in the Ukraine national team, and was one of Ukraine's most capped players. He was a member of their squad at the 2006 World Cup.

After his retirement, he went to become a coach at various clubs, including Dynamo Kyiv. He died in a motorcycle accident at the age of 41.

== Club career ==
=== Dynamo Kyiv ===
Husin was an instrumental part of the Dynamo Kyiv squad which reached the semi-final of the UEFA Champions League 1998–99 season. He continued to be a key player in the squad of Dynamo after that, even after head coach's, Valery Lobanovsky's death, and the change of coaches that followed.

=== Krylia Sovetov Samara ===
After Ukraine's qualification for the 2006 FIFA World Cup, Husin left Dynamo Kyiv to captain Russian side FC Krylia Sovetov Samara, stating that he wanted to focus on the national team instead of club football and because he had a conflict with coach Yozhef Szabo.

=== Saturn Ramenskoe ===
On 8 June 2007, Husin retired from Krylia Sovetov and joined the FC Saturn Moscow Oblast coaching staff, but in 2008 he decided to play again as well. But with the change of the coaching staff in the middle of the fall, Husin was sent away from the club for supposedly disrupting the club's unity. Husin and others deny this and say that he was sent away because new coach Jürgen Röber wanted to establish his authority at the new club.

He kept up his form with his former team, Dynamo Kyiv, but in its number-two team, Dynamo-2 Kyiv. He demanded compensation from the Saturn, which refused to pay him anything.

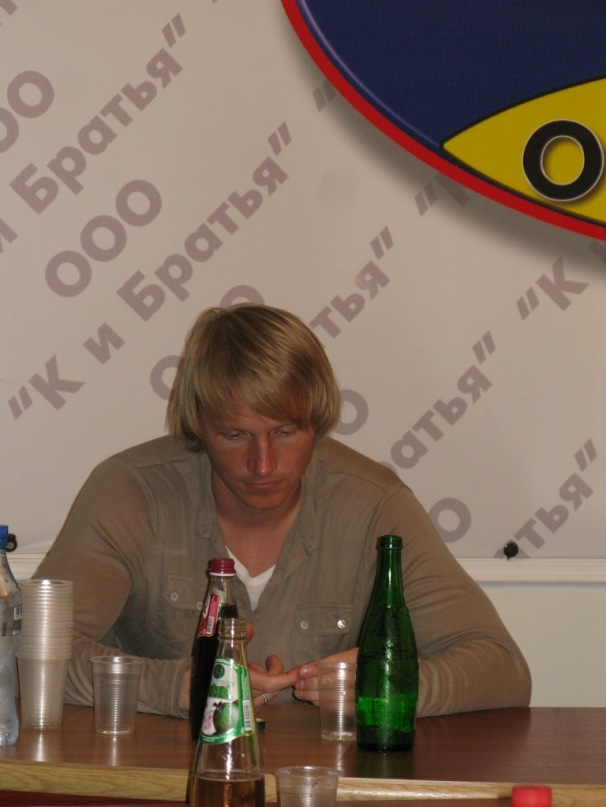
Andriy Husin at age 37 in 2010

=== FC Khimki ===
In the summer of 2009 he signed with the Russian club FC Khimki. He left the club before playing any official games when he received two injuries in a short time and decided he is not ready to play on the Russian Premier League level at the time.

== International career ==
Following the 2006 FIFA World Cup, Husin announced his retirement from international football, ending a successful 13-year international career with the Ukraine national team. When announcing his international retirement he praised Ukraine's achievement of reaching the quarter-finals in their first appearance in the tournament, in which he played an instrumental role for the Ukrainian team. However, on 15 August 2006, following lengthy conversations with his teammates, Husin announced his decision to remain in the Ukrainian team for the time being.

== Personal life and death ==
Husin died in a motorcycle crash at Kyiv's Autodrom Chayka on 17 September 2014. He was survived by his wife and three children.

== Career statistics ==
Scores and results list Ukraine's goal tally first, score column indicates score after each Husin goal.

List of international goals scored by Andriy Husin
No.	Date	Venue	Opponent	Score	Result	Competition
1	26 June 1993	Stadion Maksimir, Zagreb, Croatia	Croatia	1–2	1–3	Friendly
2	6 September 1995	Žalgiris Stadium, Vilnius, Lithuania	Lithuania	3–1	3–1	UEFA Euro 1996 qualifying
3	14 October 1998	Olimpiyskiy National Sports Complex, Kyiv, Ukraine	Armenia	2–0	2–0	UEFA Euro 2000 qualifying
4	5 June 1999	Olimpiyskiy National Sports Complex, Kyiv, Ukraine	Andorra	4–0	4–0	UEFA Euro 2000 qualifying
5	7 October 2000	Vazgen Sargsyan Republican Stadium, Yerevan, Armenia	Armenia	3–2	3–2	2002 FIFA World Cup qualification

== Honours ==
Dynamo Kyiv

- Ukrainian Premier League: 1996–97, 1997–98, 1998–99, 1999–2000, 2000–01, 2002–03, 2003–04
- Ukrainian Cup: 1997–98, 1998–99, 1999–2000, 2002–03
