= Vitaliy Kosovskyi =

Ukrainian footballer (born 1973)

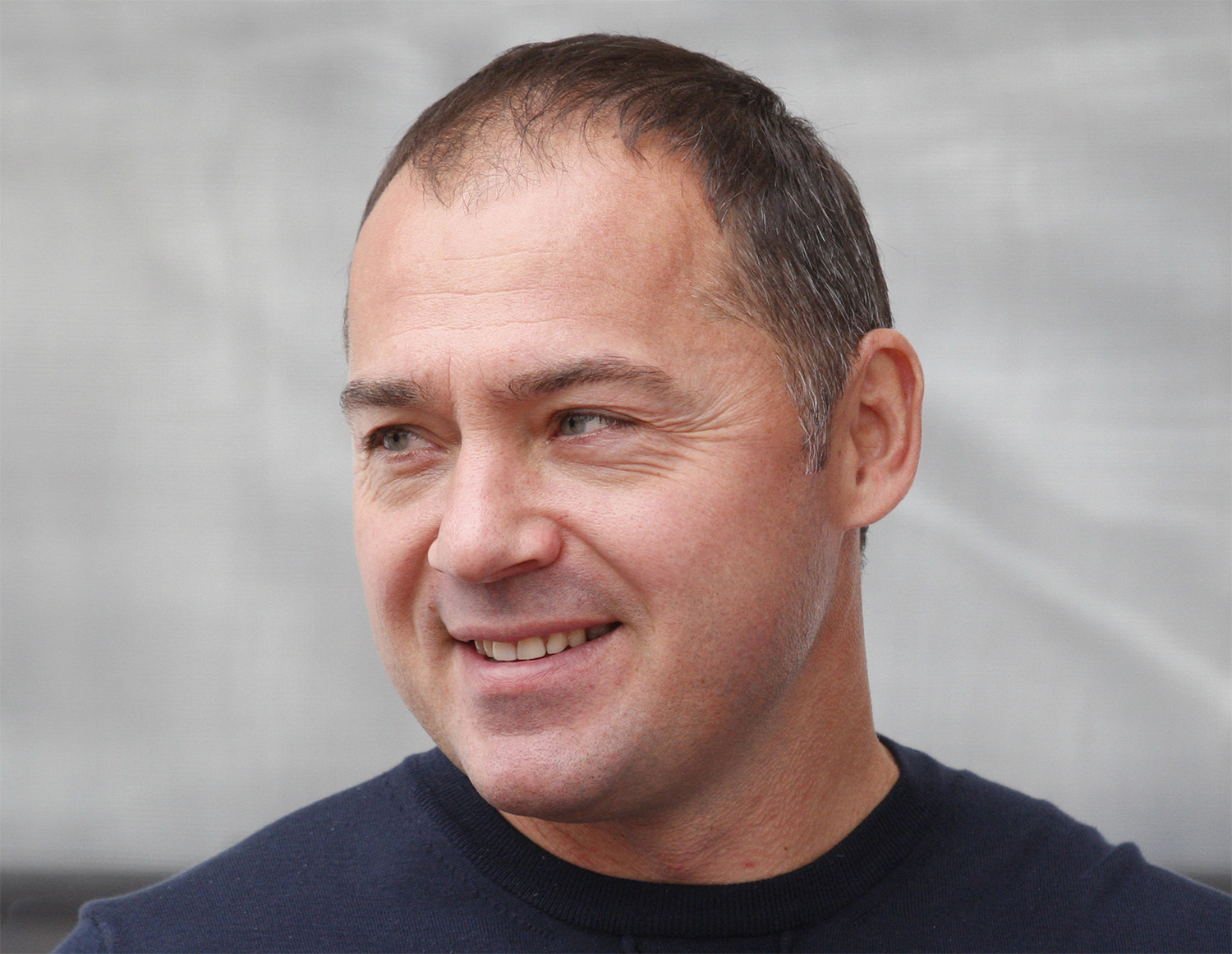

Personal information
- Full name: Vitaliy Vladyslavovych Kosovskyi
- Date of birth: 11 August 1973 (age 53)
- Place of birth: Ostroh, Ukrainian SSR, Soviet Union
- Position: Midfielder

Team information
- Current team: Vorskla Poltava (U21 manager)

Senior career*
Years	Team	Apps	(Gls)
1990–1991	Podillya Khmelnytskyi	21	(1)
1991–1994	Nyva Vinnytsia	53	(13)
1994–2003	Dynamo Kyiv	131	(20)
1997–2003	→ Dynamo-2 Kyiv	17	(2)
Total		222	(36)

International career
1996–2000	Ukraine	25	(2)

Managerial career
- 2012–2017: Dynamo Kyiv (youth)
- 2017–2018: Dynamo Kyiv (U19 assistant)
- 2019: Vorskla Poltava (U21)
- 2019: Vorskla Poltava
- 2019–: Vorskla Poltava (U21)
- * Club domestic league appearances and goals

Vitaliy Vladyslavovych Kosovskyi (Ukrainian: Віталій Владиславович Косовський; born 11 August 1973) is a Ukrainian former professional footballer who played as a midfielder for Dynamo Kyiv and a Ukraine national team.

== Early life ==
Born in Ostroh, Rivne Oblast, his first steps in football Kosovskyi started when he went to the first grade of school as it happened to be that near the school was also located a children-youth sports school. Kosovskyi explained that his father worked as a driver in Netishyn which is located in neighboring Khmelnytskyi Oblast. When in Netishyn started to be built the Khmelnytskyi Nuclear Power Plant, in 1984 Netishyn was granted the status of city and around that time the Kosovskyi family received a new apartment to which they moved.

== Club career ==
Kosovskyi is notable for representing Dynamo Kyiv in the late 1990s alongside Serhii Rebrov and Andriy Shevchenko, usually playing the starting left winger. Kosovskyi's career was cut short in the early 2000s by numerous injuries, which prevented his numerous comeback attempts. Following a nine-year career with Dynamo, Kosovsky retired in 2003 to be a scout for Dynamo Kyiv.

== International career ==
During his international career, Kosovskyi has amassed 25 caps, scoring 2 goals.

== Personal life ==
He has a son Serhiy, born in 1998, who is also a professional footballer.

== Career statistics ==
=== International ===
Appearances and goals by national team and year
National team	Year	Apps	Goals
Ukraine	1996	4	0
Ukraine	1997	9	1
Ukraine	1998	4	1
Ukraine	1999	7	0
Ukraine	2000	1	0
Total		25	2

Scores and results list Ukraine's goal tally first, score column indicates score after each Kosovskyi goal.

List of international goals scored by Vitaliy Kosovskyi
No.	Date	Venue	Opponent	Score	Result	Competition
1	2 April 1997	Olympic Stadium, Kyiv, Ukraine	Northern Ireland	1–0	2–1	1998 FIFA World Cup qualification
2	10 October 1998	Estadi Comunal d'Andorra la Vella, Andorra la Vella, Andorra	Andorra	1–0	2–0	UEFA Euro 2000 qualification
