= Aleksei Gerasimenko =

Russian footballer

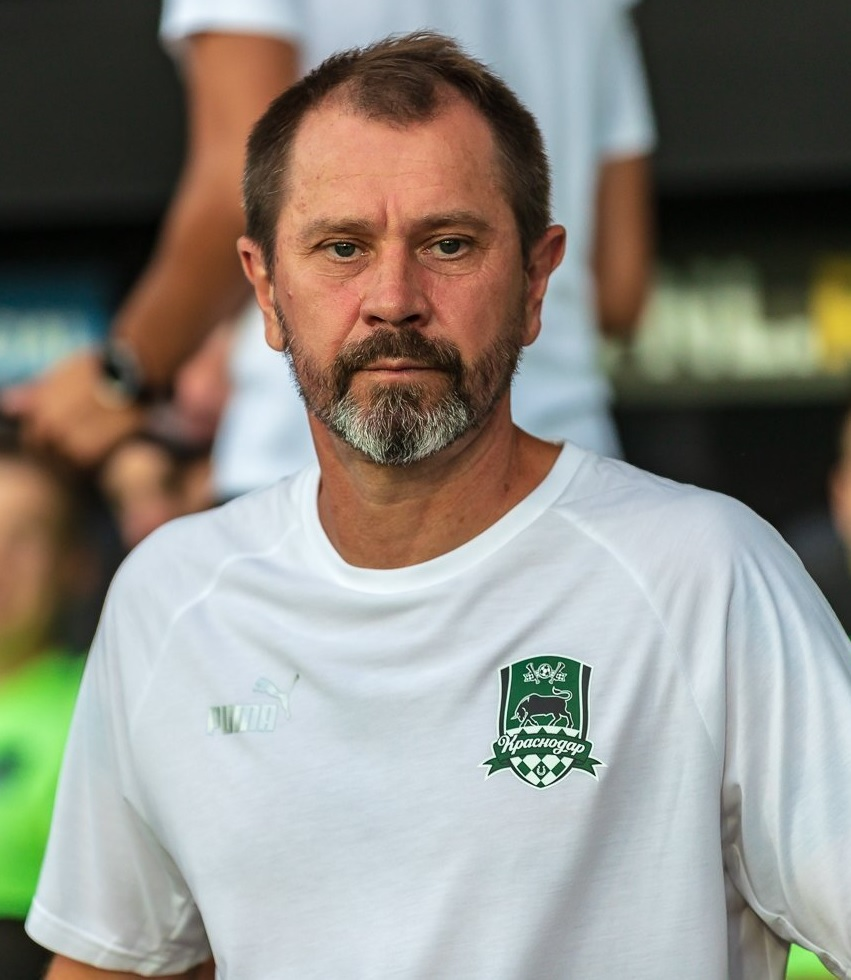
- Gerasimenko coaching Krasnodar-2 in 2022

Personal information
- Full name: Aleksei Petrovich Gerasimenko
- Date of birth: 17 December 1970 (age 55)
- Place of birth: Taganrog, Russian SFSR, Soviet Union
- Height: 1.80 m (5 ft 11 in)
- Position: Striker

Team information
- Current team: Krasnodar-2 (assistant coach)

Youth career
- Torpedo Taganrog

Senior career*
Years	Team	Apps	(Gls)
1989	Luch Azov	20	(1)
1989–1991	Torpedo Taganrog	77	(10)
1992	Kuban Krasnodar	20	(0)
1993	Rotor Volgograd	16	(0)
1994–1995	Kuban Krasnodar	71	(46)
1996–1997	Rostselmash Rostov-on-Don	61	(18)
1997–2001	Dynamo Kyiv	51	(3)
1998–2001	→ Dynamo-2 Kyiv	51	(1)
1999–2001	→ Dynamo-3 Kyiv	2	(0)
2002	Shinnik Yaroslavl	27	(4)
2003–2004	Kuban Krasnodar	7	(0)

International career
1997–1998	Russia	7	(1)

Managerial career
- 2007–2010: Dynamo Kyiv (academy)
- 2010–2011: Krasnodar (scout)
- 2012–2013: Dynamo Kyiv (assistant)
- 2013–2014: Dynamo Kyiv (U19)
- 2014–2015: Dynamo Kyiv (assistant)
- 2016: FC Kuban-3 Krasnodar
- 2020: Forte Taganrog
- 2021–2022: Krasnodar-2 (assistant)
- 2022–2023: Krasnodar-2
- 2023–: Krasnodar-2 (assistant)
- * Club domestic league appearances and goals

Aleksei Petrovich Gerasimenko (Russian: Алексей Петрович Герасименко, born 17 December 1970) is a Russian football coach and a former player. He is an assistant coach with Krasnodar-2.

== Honours ==
- Russian Premier League runner-up: 1993.
- Ukrainian Premier League winner: 1998, 1999, 2000, 2001.
- Ukrainian Cup winner: 1998, 1999, 2000.
- Top 33 best players year-end list: 1996, 1997.
- Top scorer in Second Russian Division: 1995 (30 goals in 39 games).

== International career ==
Gerasimenko played his first game for Russia on 10 February 1997 in a Carlsberg Cup game against Switzerland. He played 7 games for Russia in his career, scoring a goal in 1998 in a friendly against Poland.

=== International goals ===
#	Date	Venue	Opponent	Score	Result	Competition
1	1998-05-27	Silesian Stadium, Chorzów, Poland	Poland	1 – 1	3–1	Friendly match
