= Serhiy Mizin =

Ukrainian footballer

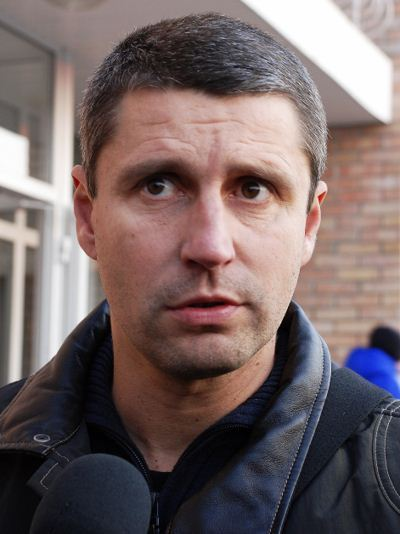

Personal information
- Full name: Serhiy Hryhorovych Mizin
- Date of birth: 25 September 1972 (age 54)
- Place of birth: Kyiv, Ukrainian SSR
- Height: 1.80 m (5 ft 11 in)
- Position: Midfielder

Youth career
- 1990–1992: FC Dynamo Kyiv

Senior career*
Years	Team	Apps	(Gls)
1992–1996	FC Dynamo Kyiv	73	(16)
1992–1995	→ FC Dynamo-2 Kyiv	47	(2)
1996	FC Dnipro Dnipropetrovsk	17	(14)
1996	FC Chornomorets Odesa	7	(2)
1997	FC CSKA Kyiv	15	(10)
1997	FC Dnipro Dnipropetrovsk	11	(4)
1997	→ FC Dnipro-2 Dnipropetrovsk	2	(1)
1998–1999	FC Karpaty Lviv	47	(12)
1998–1999	→ FC Karpaty-2 Lviv	5	(2)
2000	FC Kryvbas Kryvyi Rih	25	(7)
2000	→ FC Kryvbas-2 Kryvyi Rih	1	(0)
2001–2002	FC Metalist Kharkiv	32	(8)
2001–2002	→ FC Metalist-2 Kharkiv	5	(2)
2002–2004	FC Karpaty Lviv	40	(13)
2003	→ FC Karpaty-2 Lviv	2	(0)
2004–2008	FC Arsenal Kyiv	77	(14)

International career
1995–2003	Ukraine	7	(0)

Managerial career
- 2008–2009: FC Kharkiv (assistant)
- 2009: FC Lviv (assistant)
- 2009–2010: FC Naftovyk-Ukrnafta Okhtyrka (sport director)
- 2010–2011: FC Naftovyk-Ukrnafta Okhtyrka
- * Club domestic league appearances and goals

Serhiy Hryhorovych Mizin (Ukrainian: Сергій Григорович Мізін; born 25 September 1972) is a former Ukrainian professional football midfielder who played for FC Dynamo Kyiv, FC CSKA Kyiv, FC Chornomorets Odesa, FC Dnipro Dnipropetrovsk, FC Karpaty Lviv, FC Kryvbas Kryvyi Rih, FC Metalist Kharkiv and FC Arsenal Kyiv in Ukrainian Premier League. He also scored 90 goals in 344 matches in the Ukrainian Premier League.

Mizin made seven appearances for the Ukraine national football team.

== Honours ==
- Ukrainian Premier League champion: 1993, 1994, 1995.
- Ukrainian Cup winner: 1993.
