= FC Dynamo-3 Kyiv =

- Full name: FC Dynamo-3 Kyiv
- Nickname(s): Dynamo's juniors
- Founded: 1992
- Dissolved: 2008
- Ground: Training ground, Kyiv (Koncha-Zaspa)
- Capacity: Less than 1000
- League: Ukrainian Second League
- 2007–08: 10th (dissolved)

FC Dynamo-3 Kyiv was a Ukrainian football team based in Kyiv, Ukraine. The team has been featured in the Ukrainian Second League, since it cannot be promoted to the Ukrainian First League, being a junior team from the FC Dynamo Kyiv franchise, which already has its 2nd tier team (FC Dynamo-2 Kyiv) in the First League.

== History ==
Like most tributary teams, the best players are sent up to the senior team, meanwhile developing other junior players for further call-ups. The team consists of Dynamo's players whose average age is less than 20—In essence the club's future. The players usually progress to this team through the Dynamo Kyiv youth system.

Dynamo-3 Kyiv is withdrawn from the Ukrainian Second League 2008-09 season to allow MFK Mykolaiv reenter the PFL and compete.

== League and cup history ==
Season	Div.	Pos.	Pl.	W	D	L	GS	GA	P	Domestic Cup	Other		Notes
1993–94	4th	3	26	17	6	3	44	13	40				Group 3
1994–95	4th	2	30	17	8	5	45	18	59				Group 3
1995–96	5th	Kyiv Oblast championship											
1996–97	4th	3	16	6	4	6	22	18	22				Promoted
1997–98	3rd "A"	2	34	21	7	6	59	24	70	1/16 finals			
1998–99	3rd "A"	5	28	13	7	8	30	26	18	1/128 finals			
1999-00	3rd "A"	9	30	10	11	9	38	26	41		2L	1/8 finals	
2000–01	3rd "A"	7	30	12	10	8	26	16	46		2L	1/16 finals	
2001–02	3rd "B"	6	34	16	9	9	48	32	57				
2002–03	3rd "A"	5	28	14	8	6	30	22	50				
2003–04	3rd "A"	11	30	9	7	14	26	27	34				
2004–05	3rd "A"	10	28	9	7	12	31	35	34				
2005–06	3rd "A"	11	28	7	8	13	17	28	29				
2006–07	3rd "A"	7	28	5	10	13	29	32	25				
2007–08	3rd "A"	10	30	9	5	16	30	43	32				withdrew

== See also ==
- FC Dynamo Kyiv
- FC Dynamo-2 Kyiv
