= FC Borysfen Boryspil =

Borisfen Boryspil
- Founded: 1993; 2013 (re-founded)
- Dissolved: 2007
- Ground: Kolos Stadium, Boryspil
- Chairman: Ihor Kovalevych
- League: Kyiv Oblast Regional League
Home colours	Away colours

FC Borysfen Boryspil is a Ukrainian former football club from Boryspil. The club was created as a phoenix club in 1997 by Ihor Kovalevych after disagreement in FC CSKA Kyiv (FC Arsenal Kyiv). Later, the Central Sports Club of the Armed Forces of Ukraine (CSK ZSU) established a joint team "CSKA-Borysfen" for the Ukrainian Vyshcha Liha (Ukrainian Premier League).

== Overview ==
=== Foundation and joining Nyva Myronivka ===
The club takes its roots from the appearance of FC Boryspil, established on 9 March 1993 by Ukrainian geologist and entrepreneur Dmytro Zlobenko (1961–2013) along with his partner Ihor Kovalevych and his science production firm "Geoton". Zlobenko managed to find ways in cooperation with local administrations of Myronivka and Boryspil raions (districts in the southeastern part of Kyiv Oblast). With the ongoing season, the club merged with the already existing FC Nyva Myronivka that competed at the Ukrainian Transition League (at that time was considered to have semi-professional status) and took over their brand temporary renaming into Nyva-Borysfen, while the original Nyva restarted as FC Nyva Karapyshi in the Kyiv Oblast Championship. The idea of club's organization, in the beginning, came from another former football player and coach from Kyiv, Ivan Terletskyi who also offered to seek help from Mikhail Oshenkov, a son of Oleg Oshenkov and worked closely with Valeriy Lobanovskyi. Among other people who were involved in creation of the new club were the children coach out from Kuchakiv, Viktor Haiduk, the director of the local "Kolos" sports society Mykola Kostianets, the head of the Boryspil Raion state administration, Mykhailo Muzyka, and the mayor of Boryspil, Oleksandr Prydatko.

The original coach, Volodymyr Kolomiets, was kept to manage the club. Some new players were brought to the squad like Igoris Pankratjevas from FC Dynamo Kyiv and Oleksandr Ivanov from FC Metalist Kharkiv. With the help of Anatoliy Kroshchenko (at that time coached FC Dynamo-3 Kyiv), Nyva-Borysfen's squad was increased with Dynamo Kyiv's young footballers. The same year (1993) Nyva-Borysfen won the Kyiv Oblast Cup, to participate in the Ukrainian Cup competitions. The new Nyva-Borysfen started with a home loss to FC Naftokhimik Kremenchuk, while its next game it surprisingly won away in Kerch against the local FC Voikovets. The first recorded game of the merged club took place on 3 April 1993. Nonetheless, the team failed to meet their goals placing just outside the promotion zone in the tournament table.

=== Sponsorship of the Football Federation of Ukraine ===
Since 1993, Dmytro Zlobenko provided funding for the newly reformed Football Federation of Ukraine (FFU). He sponsored various FFU projects, tours, and travels of its teams. The amount of financial support was over $500,000. The club administration managed to find a common ground with Yevhen Kotelnykov who at that time was the first vice-president of the Football Federation of Ukraine and played a key role in Ukrainian football. At the club presentation that took place in Kyiv was present Anatoliy Konkov who then administered the Ukrainian amateur football.

Among main sponsored events were an international tournament in Spain for Volodymyr Muntyan U-21 team and a tour of the Ukraine national football team (coached by Oleh Bazylevych) to the United States. Later the club's administration helped the Volodymyr Kyianenko U-16 team (predecessor of Ukraine U-17 team) with a travel to the 1994 UEFA European Under-16 Championship where it placed third. Cooperation with the Muntyan's youth team gave certain preferences in signing several better players, among which were Hennadiy Moroz and Vitaliy Pushkutsa. The latter was targeted by Dynamo Kyiv and was signed just before Dynamo came with its offer. Alas, a signing of Vitaliy Kosovskyi did not materialized as Dynamo was faster in signing him, also fell through a transfer of Oleh Luzhnyi. In 1993, the club among the first in Ukraine built its football stadium (Kolos Stadium) on the funds of private investors. It was completely demolished and built anew in three months. It was completed just before the Ukrainian Cup game against Dynamo, during the 1993-94 season. During the stadium's reconstruction, Borysfen played at a high school stadium in Shchaslyve.

=== Second League and Borysfen Boryspil ===
Before the 1993–94 season in the Second League, the place of newly promoted Nyva-Borysfen was de facto handed over to the newly established FC Borysfen Boryspil, while Nyva, which restarted as FC Nyva Karapyshi, was reinstated as Nyva Myronivka in the Transitional League (Perekhidna Liha). The promoted Borysfen Boryspil managed to secure Viktor Kolotov who along with Anatoliy Demyanenko joined the club coming from CSK ZSU Kyiv. During the summer interseason the new club was conducting tryouts for several players who previously played for FC Dynamo-2 Kyiv or were affiliated with Dynamo Kyiv football school system. Among those players it is worth to mention such as Oleksandr Shovkovskyi, Vladyslav Vashchuk, Ihor Fedorov, Oleksandr Venhlinskyi, Viktor Belkin, Mykola Volosyanko. In the preseason FC Borysfen signed several other important players such as Stepan Matviyiv (top scorer of 1992–93 season). Also, while looking for a new club during the summer interseason, the Soviet international player Hennadiy Litovchenko played a few friendlies on the team, but later stayed in the club.

FC Borysfen Boryspil became the first Ukrainian club out of Druha Liha that spent its inter-seasonal break abroad in the German neighborhood Ruit (part of Ostfildern), which was a favorite spot of FC Dynamo Kyiv and Valeriy Lobanovskyi, in particular and Graz in Austria. Its first game at the professional level the club played on 17 August 1993 in Kerch against the local Voikovets. In the 1993–94 Ukrainian Cup, the club passed two rounds, beating such clubs as FC Khimik Zhytomyr and FC Nyva Karapyshi, but was eliminated in the round of 32 against Dynamo Kyiv. After the first half, Borysfen was leading with closest pursuer FC Yavir Krasnopillia trailing by a point. After three days of negotiations, Lobanovskyi signed a contract with the Kuwait national football team. The club changed its name to FC Boryspil during the winter break. The new coach was Volodymyr Bezsonov. His assistant became Volodymyr Muntyan. During midseason the club lost Litovchenko who left for Admira Wacker. The club signed debutants Hennadiy Moroz, Eduard Tsykhmeistruk, Vitaliy Pushkutsa, Ervand Sukiasian, Viktor Ulianytskyi, Oleksandr Lyubynskyi, Andriy Kyrlyk, Vitaliy Ponomarenko, Mykhailo Stelmakh.

=== First League and merger with CSKA ===
Successes of the Boryspil club have done the job and Borysfen returned its previous name. For the new season Bezsonov shuffled coaching staff, inviting Yevhen Lemeshko, Ivan Terletskyi, and Viktor Chanov. Beside having Viktor Chanov as a goalie coach, the new season Borysfen started out with such experienced goalies like Volodymyr Savchenko, Valeriy Vorobyov, Oleksandr Humenyuk, and Vadim Egoshkin. Also the club managed to secure services of the Ukraine's international Dmytro Topchiev. The season Borysfen started out well, but lost several important games including one in Kirovohrad (Kropyvnytskyi) against the local FC Zirka-NIBAS Kirovohrad. The culmination came in September when the club lost to FC Dynamo-2 Kyiv 0:4 with the first goal has been scored by the unknown at that time 17 year old Andriy Shevchenko. Following the loss, Zlobenko replaced Bezsonov with Mykhailo Fomenko who was about to sign a contract with the Guinea national football team and has won his first game with the team against Botswana at the 1996 African Cup of Nations qualification. At the winter break the club was placing third in the league.

In the 1994–95 Ukrainian Cup, the club again passed two rounds beating such clubs like FC Zmina-Obolon Kyiv and FC CSKA Kyiv (both playing away), but was eliminated in the round of 32 losing in two legs play-off against FC Veres Rivne.

At the same time, FC CSKA Kyiv was playing in the 1994–95 Ukrainian Third League, which was to be discontinued for the next seasons, and most clubs would have been admitted to the Second League (Druha Liha). Before that, CSKA played as CSK ZSU Kyiv in the 1992-93 Ukrainian Second League and was relegated. Led by Volodymyr Lozynskyi, FC CSKA Kyiv won the 1994–95 season in the Third League (Tretia Liha) gaining 101 season points and was to be promoted back to the Second League. Yet, the armymen wanted something more. During the 1994–95 winter break the Minister of Defense Valeriy Shmarov and Dmytro Zlobenko reached an agreement about uniting of efforts and creation of the club CSKA–Borysfen. At disposal of Boryspil partners there appeared a football "administrative resource" of the army allowing, for example, at once to "call" under the club's colours from FC Veres Rivne the most talented half-back Oleksandr Svystunov and the other side received financial rears that CSKA so lacked. The team had lived in a hotel on territory of the RUFK boarding school (today Piddubny Olympic College) where it had trained among other places such as CSKA Stadium and sometimes Republican Stadium. At the same time the Ministry of Defense kept its original CSKA team as well that continued to play at the Second League.

In the 1995 spring portion of the season, CSKA–Borysfen started under a new name, being registered in the capital city with notable reinforcements. To the team's games that were played at the CSKA Stadium on Povitroflotskyi prospekt were drawn football fans as the team was composed of legends of Soviet football, merited masters of sport, and holders of many other whatnot titles. To its first spring game against Krystal from Chortkiv, the team consisted of following players Viktor Chanov, Oleh Kuznetsov, Yervand Sukiasyan, Mikheil Jishkariani, Andriy Annenkov, Vladyslav Prudius, Stepan Matviyiv, Mykola Volosyanko, Mykola Zakotyuk, Vitaliy Pushkutsa, and Oleh Pestryakov. The squad completely thrashed Krystal 5:0 and then seven games in a row went without a loss, stumbled two times in a row, and confidently finished the end of season. With the help of Andrei Fedkov, the team managed to beat its main opponent of the season, FC Zirka Kirovohrad, finishing second overall.

=== Own history ===
In 1997, a new club was reestablished under the name of FC Borysfen Borysfen and started at amateur level and soon was promoted to Druha Liha. The club eventually won through to the Ukrainian Premier League, but by 2005 they finished in last position and were relegated back to the Persha Liha. In the 2005–06 and 2006–07 seasons played in the Ukrainian First League. In 2007, the club suffered financial difficulties, went into bankruptcy and folded.

=== Rebirth ===
In 2013, the club was reformed as a youth club that would participate in the Kyiv Oblast competition with the future goals of returning to the national competition.

== Honors ==
- Ukrainian Second League: 1

1999-00

- Ukrainian Second League Cup: 1

1999-00

Runners-up

- Ukrainian First League: 2

2002–03

- Ukrainian Second League: 2

1998–99

== League and cup history ==
Season	Div.	Pos.	Pl.	W	D	L	GS	GA	P	Domestic Cup	Europe	Notes
1997–98	3rd	14	34	11	7	16	38	48	40	1/128 finals		FC Borysfen Boryspil
1998–99	3rd	2	28	17	7	4	37	10	58			
1999-00	3rd	1	26	19	3	4	57	9	60	1/8 finals		Promoted
2000–01	2nd	12	34	12	7	15	28	34	43	1/16 finals		
2001–02	2nd	13	34	10	10	14	44	47	40	1/16 finals		
2002–03	2nd	2	34	19	9	6	44	16	66	1/16 finals		Promoted
2003–04	1st	7	30	11	8	11	25	29	41	1/8 finals		
2004–05	1st	16	30	3	11	16	15	31	20	1/16 finals		Relegated
2005–06	2nd	16	34	3	14	17	23	46	23	1/32 finals		
2006–07	2nd	19	36	1	4	31	10	29	1	1/8 finals		Club is bankrupt and is dissolved after winter break

== Reserves and academy ==
Borysfen-2 was a farm team of FC Borysfen. The team registered for the 2000 Ukrainian Amateur Cup, but after losing its first game to Dnipro Kyiv at home, it refused to continue.

Season	Div.	Pos.	Pl.	W	D	L	GS	GA	P	Domestic Cup	Europe	Notes
2001–02	3rd "B"	15	34	11	3	20	35	50	36			
2002–03	3rd "B"	14	30	9	1	20	23	51	28			
2003–04	3rd "A"	16	30	7	6	17	28	46	27			Relegated
