= FC Arsenal Kyiv =

Ukrainian football club, 1925 to 2019

Arsenal Kyiv
- Full name: Football Club Arsenal Kyiv
- Nickname: Zbroyari (Gunsmith in English)
- Founded: 1925; 101 years ago
- Ground: Arsenal-Knyazha Arena, Shchaslyve; Kolos Stadium, Boryspil; CSK ZSU Stadium, Kyiv; Valeriy Lobanovskyi Dynamo Stadium, Kyiv
- Capacity: 1,000 (Arsenal-Knyazha Arena); 5,654 (Kolos Stadium); 12,000 (CSK ZSU Stadium); 16,873 (Valeriy Lobanovskyi Dynamo Stadium)
- 2018–19: Ukrainian Premier League, 12th (withdrawn)
- Website: https://arsenalkyivacademy.wixsite.com/arsenal
Home colours	Away colours

Football Club Arsenal Kyiv (Ukrainian: Футбо́льний Клуб Арсена́л–Київ) is a Ukrainian football club based in Kyiv. In 2019, the club's professional team was dissolved, but its junior teams continue to compete in city competitions. The club claims to be a successor of Kyiv Arsenal factory team which traces its history back to 1925. The original factory team used to compete in the Soviet Class B (later reorganized as Soviet Second League), but was relegated in 1964 and officially dissolved (lost professional status).

The football club of the Ukrainian post-Soviet period was created in 1993 and brought to Kyiv from Boryspil by a geological company Geoton which was one of main sponsors of the Football Federation of Ukraine and Ukraine national football team in the beginning. In 1995–2001 through a merger, the club was reconstituted by the Ministry of Defense as a separate government enterprise not part of the Central Sports Club of the Armed Forces of Ukraine. During that period (1995–2001) it competed in the Ukrainian Top League under CSKA Kyiv brand as its senior (main) squad, while the original army squad continued to compete in lower leagues. In 1995 it was relocated to Kyiv playing at CSK ZSU Stadium and carried such names as CSKA-Borysfen and CSKA, while the original FC CSKA Kyiv competing in lower leagues changed its name to CSKA-2 as its reserve squad. Due to difficulty of financing, the ownership of senior squad was transferred to the Kyiv city authorities during the winter break of 2001–02 as part of Oleksandr Omelchenko political project and the newly acquired squad was renamed as Arsenal in memory of the factory team.

Between 2002 and 2008, Arsenal was a municipal club of Kyiv city and played its games at the Olympiyskiy National Sports Complex. Later when the club was sold to the Ukrainian politician Vadym Rabinovych who promised to build the club's own stadium within the Kyiv city limits, but instead came up with a campaign to revive the history of another Arsenal Kyiv, a factory team of Kyiv Arsenal, which was dissolved in the 1960s and consider the current Arsenal Kyiv a phoenix club of its predecessor. In 2013 soon after Rabinovych sold the club to another Ukrainian politician it was abandoned and dissolved.

Due to the efforts of Ukrainian racer Oleksiy Kikireshko, the club was revived in 2014 as Arsenal-Kyiv and based in Shchaslyve located right on the eastern outskirts of Kyiv.

== History ==
=== Timeline and names ===
- 1925–1963: During this period the first installment of the club was originally formed as Mashynobudivnyk (Machinist) and then later, Arsenal.
  - In 1963 Arsenal was dissolved and replaced by Temp Kyiv, its sports school continued to compete at city competitions.
- 1993–2013: The second installment of the club was formed under the name Borysfen and later changed names due to several events during this period.
  - 1993: Borysfen → Nyva–Borysfen : the club merged with FC Nyva Myronivka in the Transitional League in the middle of the 1992–93 season as Nyva–Borysfen.
  - 1993: Nyva–Borysfen → FC Borysfen Boryspil : started out in the Second League in place of FC Nyva Myronivka, due to the merger, for the 1993–94 season under the new name of FC Borysfen Boryspil.
  - 1994: FC Borysfen Boryspil → FC Boryspil : then changed its name to FC Boryspil during winter break and gained promotion and the end of the season.
  - 1994: FC Borysfen Boryspil → FC CSKA–Borysfen Boryspil : merged with CSK ZSU Kyiv as FC CSKA–Borysfen Boryspil for the 1994–95 season
  - 1995: FC CSKA–Borysfen Boryspil → FC CSKA–Borysfen Kyiv : relocated to Kyiv, which saw another name change to highlight its base at the CSK ZSU Stadium in Kyiv, which belonged to the Central Sports Club of the Armed Forces of Ukraine.
  - 1996: FC CSKA–Borysfen Kyiv → FC CSKA Kyiv and FC Borysfen Boryspil : a disagreement with members and key stakeholders of the club brought about the splitting of FC CSKA–Borysfen Kyiv to form FC CSKA Kyiv and FC Borysfen Boryspil.
  - 2001: FC CSKA Kyiv → FC Arsenal Kyiv : during this year, the Kyiv City governing body purchased the club from Ministry of Defense and adopted new name to draw on the history and significance of the former identity.
  - 2013: FC Arsenal Kyiv filed for bankruptcy and was dissolved.
- 2014–2019: The third installment of the club was formed under the name of FC Arsenal-Kyiv.
  - 2014: FC Arsenal-Kyiv was established and was based at the Arsenal's Football Academy, and stadium, in Shchaslyve. This was a culmination of efforts from its fan and private investors, among which was notably Oleksiy Kikireshko.
  - 2018: In four years, FC Arsenal-Kyiv passed through the lower three leagues to be crowned as Champions of the Ukrainian First League and promotion (and return) to the Ukrainian Premier League.
  - 2019: Another collapse in management and lackluster performance in the Premier League saw FC Arsenal-Kyiv cement itself to the bottom of the Premier League table and its relegation and withdrawal from the League.

=== Soviet period ===
Created on 14 July 1925, as a multi-sports club of the Arsenal Factory in Kyiv, before World War II the club played mostly in regional competitions for factory workers. In 1936 Arsenal Kyiv took part in the Soviet Cup in football where it was eliminated after the first round of competition after a replay.

After World War II the club played in the Ukrainian Soviet competitions under the name of FC Mashynobudivnyk Kyiv (the SC Arsenal Kyiv also used to have a hockey team, HC Zenit Kyiv). In 1958 Mashynobudivnyk won the competitions and was accepted to the Soviet Class B under the name of FC Arsenal Kyiv. In 1959–1964 the club played in the Soviet Class B. In 1964 the teams of master Arsenal Kyiv was dissolved. In reality however, FC Arsenal Kyiv either lost its relegation play-off or simply yielded its place to already existing FC Temp Kyiv which represented the Kyiv aviation factory Aviant (today part of Antonov corporation). After the season Temp was withdrawn and until the end of 1960s played at the Soviet competitions among collectives of physical culture (KFK).

Later the Arsenal factory also was fielding its football team in the competitions among collectives of physical culture in 1972 – 1977, 1979 and 1980.

=== Nyva-Borysfen, FC Boryspil, and CSKA-Borysfen (1993–2001) ===
==== Foundation and Nyva Myronivka ====
The club takes its roots from the appearance of FC Boryspil and that fact is well documented. FC Boryspil was established on 9 March 1993 by Ukrainian geologist and entrepreneur Dmytro Zlobenko (1961–2013) along with his partner Ihor Kovalevych and his science production firm "Geoton". Zlobenko managed to find ways in cooperation with local administrations of Myronivka and Boryspil raions (districts in the southeastern part of Kyiv Oblast). With the ongoing season, the club merged with the already existing FC Nyva Myronivka that competed at the Ukrainian Transition League (at that time was considered to have semi-professional status) and took over their brand temporary renaming into Nyva-Borysfen, while the original Nyva restarted as FC Nyva Karapyshi in the Kyiv Oblast Championship. The idea of club's organization, in the beginning, came from another former football player and coach from Kyiv, Ivan Terletskyi who also offered to seek help from Mikhail Oshenkov, a son of Oleg Oshenkov and worked closely with Valeriy Lobanovskyi. Among other people who were involved in creation of the new club were children coach out of Kuchakiv, Viktor Haiduk, director of the local "Kolos" sports society Mykola Kostianets, head of the Boryspil Raion state administration, Mykhailo Muzyka, and Boryspil mayor, Oleksandr Prydatko.

The original coach Volodymyr Kolomiets was left managing the club. Some new players were brought to the squad like Igoris Pankratjevas from FC Dynamo Kyiv and Oleksandr Ivanov from FC Metalist Kharkiv. With the help of Anatoliy Kroshchenko (at that time coached FC Dynamo-3 Kyiv), Nyva-Borysfen's squad was increased with Dynamo Kyiv's young footballers. The same year (1993) Nyva-Borysfen won the Kyiv Oblast Cup, in order to participate in the Ukrainian Cup competitions. The new Nyva-Borysfen started out with a home loss to FC Naftokhimik Kremenchuk, while its next game it surprisingly won away in Kerch against the local FC Voikovets. The first recorded game of the merged club took place on 3 April 1993.

Fielded squad: Ruslan Novikov, Serhiy Kalian, Serhiy Yaroshenko, Vyacheslav Nivinskyi, Oleksandr Otlyotov, Andriy Mikhno, Yuriy Hetman (Kostiantyn Chupys, 40; Oleh Balyuk, 80), Ihor Symonenko, Serhiy Hura (Mykhailo Bezruchko, 55) Yuriy Zhabynskyi, Oleg Solovyov. Coach – Volodymyr Kolomiets.

At the same time in Boryspil started out reconstruction of Kolos Stadium. Already since 15 May 1993, Nyva-Borysfen played its home games at the CSK ZSU Stadium. Nonetheless, the team failed its goals placing just outside the promotion zone in a tournament table. Luckily, the FFU Executive Committee decided to expand leagues and the "Myronivka Boryspilians" obtained the opportunity to jump on a last train car of the amateur "train" that was moving towards the official professional competitions, while heading back there was a more sad "train" that carried to the Transition League relegated from the last place FC CSK ZSU Kyiv. During the inter-seasonal break there were almost no changes made to the club's squad and coaching staff, except for a few players who went on to play for Borysfen Boryspil.

==== Sponsorship of the Football Federation of Ukraine ====
Since 1993, Dmytro Zlobenko provided funding for still developing and young Football Federation of Ukraine (FFU). He sponsored various FFU projects, tours and travels of its teams. The amount of financial support was over $500,000. The club administration managed to find a common ground with Yevhen Kotelnykov who at that time was the first vice-president of the Football Federation of Ukraine and played a key role in Ukrainian football. At the club presentation that took place in Kyiv was present Anatoliy Konkov who then administered the Ukrainian amateur football.

Among main sponsored events were an international tournament in Spain for Volodymyr Muntyan U-21 team and a tour of the Ukraine national football team (coached by Oleh Bazylevych) to the United States. Later the club's administration helped the Volodymyr Kyianenko U-16 team (predecessor of Ukraine U-17 team) with a travel to the 1994 UEFA European Under-16 Championship where it placed third. Cooperation with the Muntyan's youth team gave certain preferences in signing several better players among which were Hennadiy Moroz and Vitaliy Pushkutsa. The latter was targeted by Dynamo Kyiv and was signed just before Dynamo came with its offer. Alas, a signing of Vitaliy Kosovskyi did not materialized as Dynamo was faster in signing him, also fell through a transfer of Oleh Luzhnyi.

In 1993, the club among the first in Ukraine built its football stadium in Boryspil (Kolos Stadium) on the funds of private investors. It was completely demolished and built anew in three months. It was completed just before the game for Ukrainian Cup against Dynamo during the 1993-94 season. During the stadium's reconstruction, Borysfen played at a high school stadium in Shchaslyve.

==== Second League and Borysfen Boryspil ====
Before the 1993–94 season in the Second League, the place of newly promoted Nyva-Borysfen was de facto handed over to the newly established FC Borysfen Boryspil, while Nyva that restarted as FC Nyva Karapyshi was reinstated as Nyva Myronivka in the Transitional League (Perekhidna Liha). The promoted Borysfen Boryspil managed to secure head coach services of Viktor Kolotov who along with Anatoliy Demyanenko joined the club coming from CSK ZSU Kyiv. During the summer interseason the new club was conducting tryouts for several players who previously played for FC Dynamo-2 Kyiv or were affiliated with Dynamo Kyiv football school system. Among those players it is worth to mention such as Oleksandr Shovkovskyi, Vladyslav Vashchuk, Ihor Fedorov, Oleksandr Venhlinskyi, Viktor Belkin, Mykola Volosyanko. In the preseason FC Borysfen signed several other important players such as Stepan Matviyiv (top scorer of 1992–93 season). Also while looking after a new club during the summer interseason, the Soviet international player Hennadiy Litovchenko played few friendlies on the team, but later stayed in the club.

FC Borysfen Boryspil became the first Ukrainian club out of Druha Liha that spent its inter-seasonal break abroad in the German neighborhood Ruit (part of Ostfildern, near Stuttgart) which was favorite spot of FC Dynamo Kyiv and Valeriy Lobanovskyi, in particular and Graz in Austria.

Its first game at professional level the club played on 17 August 1993 in Kerch against the local Voikovets tying it at 2.

Fielded squad: Oleksandr Filipchenko – Ihor Fedorov, Dmytro Koryenyev, Mykola Volosyanko, Dmytro Semchuk – Vladimir Matsigura, Oleksandr Venhlinskyi (Note: a brother of Oleh Venhlinskyi) (Oleh Sukhomlynov), Pavlo Nesterchuk, Viktor Byelkin (Mykhailo Bezruchko) – Oleg Solovyov, Serhiy Kovalyov (Oleksandr Ivanov). Coach – Viktor Kolotov.

In the 1993–94 Ukrainian Cup, the club passed two rounds beating such clubs like FC Khimik Zhytomyr and FC Nyva Karapyshi (predecessor of the revived Nyva Myronivka), but was eliminated in the round of 32 losing both games of two legs play-off against FC Dynamo Kyiv.

During the first half the Kolotov's team nine times tied losing points with not very strong opponents. Although in main games were obtained decisive home victories, and succeeded in tying with strong Naftokhimik in Kremenchuk, in a spring Borysfen changed a head coach, its squad and the club's name. After the first half Borysfen was leading with closest pursuer FC Yavir Krasnopillia trailing by a point. At the end of 1993 FC Borysfen was negotiating with Valeriy Lobanovskyi who had his contract expired with United Arab Emirates (UAE national football team). After three days of negotiations, Lobanovskyi signed a contract with the Kuwait national football team. The club changed its name to FC Boryspil during the winter break. The new head coach was appointed Volodymyr Bezsonov who also was coaching CSK ZSU previously as Kolotov, leaving his armymen to Volodymyr Lozynskyi. His assistant became Volodymyr Muntyan. During midseason the club lost Litovchenko who left for Admira Wacker. During the winter break, the club again spent time abroad leaving twice to Slovakia and again to Ruit-Ostfildern in Germany. The club joined following debutants Hennadiy Moroz, Eduard Tsykhmeistruk, Vitaliy Pushkutsa, Ervand Sukiasian, Viktor Ulianytskyi, Oleksandr Lyubynskyi, Andriy Kyrlyk, Vitaliy Ponomarenko, Mykhailo Stelmakh. Started out a bit shy with draws in the rows, the club managed to gain the champion's stride with only one loss in the second half and winning early the Druha Liha (Second League).

==== First League and merger with CSKA ====
Successes of the Boryspil club have done their job and Borysfen, that before its debut in the 1994–95 Ukrainian First League (Persha Liha) returned its previous name, a priori was considered among the season's favorites. For the new season Bezsonov shuffled his coaching staff inviting Yevhen Lemeshko, Ivan Terletskyi, and Viktor Chanov. Beside having Viktor Chanov as a goalie coach, the new season Borysfen started out with such experienced goalies like Volodymyr Savchenko, Valeriy Vorobyov, Oleksandr Humenyuk, and Vadim Egoshkin. Also the club managed to secure services of the Ukraine's international Dmytro Topchiev. The season Borysfen started out well, but lost several important games including one in Kirovohrad (Kropyvnytskyi) against the local FC Zirka-NIBAS Kirovohrad. The culmination came in September when the club lost to FC Dynamo-2 Kyiv 0:4 with the first goal has been scored by the unknown at that time 17 year old Andriy Shevchenko. Following the loss, Zlobenko replaced Bezsonov with Mykhailo Fomenko who was about to sign a contract with the Guinea national football team and has won his first game with the team against Botswana at the 1996 African Cup of Nations qualification. At the winter break the club was placing third in the league.

In the 1994–95 Ukrainian Cup, the club again passed two rounds beating such clubs like FC Zmina-Obolon Kyiv and FC CSKA Kyiv (both playing away), but was eliminated in the round of 32 losing in two legs play-off against FC Veres Rivne.

At the same time FC CSKA Kyiv was playing at the 1994–95 Ukrainian Third League which was to be discontinued for the next seasons and most clubs would have been admitted to the Second League (Druha Liha). Before that CSKA played as CSK ZSU Kyiv in the 1992–93 Ukrainian Second League and was relegated. Led by Volodymyr Lozynskyi, FC CSKA Kyiv won the 1994–95 season in the Third League (Tretia Liha) gaining 101 season points and was to be promoted back to the Second League. Yet, the armymen wanted something more. During the 1994–95 winter break the Minister of Defense Valeriy Shmarov and Dmytro Zlobenko reached an agreement about uniting of efforts and creation of the club CSKA–Borysfen. At disposal of Boryspil partners there appeared a football "administrative resource" of the army allowing, for example, at once to "call" under the club's colours from FC Veres Rivne the most talented half-back Oleksandr Svystunov and the other side received financial rears that CSKA so lacked. The team had lived in a hotel on territory of the RUFK boarding school (today Piddubny Olympic College) where it had trained among other places such as CSKA Stadium and sometimes even Republican Stadium. At the same time the Ministry of Defense kept its original CSKA team as well that continued to play at the Second League.

The 1995 spring portion of the season CSKA–Borysfen started out under new name, being registered in the capital city, and notable reinforcement. To the team's games that played at the CSKA Stadium on Povitroflotskyi prospekt were drawn football fans as the team was composed out of legends of the Soviet football, merited masters of sport, and holders of many other whatnot titles. To its first spring game against Krystal from Chortkiv, the team consisted of following players Viktor Chanov, Oleh Kuznetsov, Yervand Sukiasyan, Mikheil Jishkariani, Andriy Annenkov, Vladyslav Prudius, Stepan Matviyiv, Mykola Volosyanko, Mykola Zakotyuk, Vitaliy Pushkutsa, and Oleh Pestryakov. The squad completely thrashed Krystal 5:0 and then seven games in a row went without a loss, stumbled two times in a row, and confidently finished the end of season. With help of Andrei Fedkov, the team managed to beat its main opponent of the season, FC Zirka Kirovohrad, finishing second after Zirka.

==== Top league debut ====
Since the 1995–96 season, the club has continuously competed in the top flight until its bankruptcy in late 2013.

The optimal squad consisted of Vitaliy Reva, Mykola Volosyanko, Serhiy Diryavka, Serhiy Fedorov, Mykola Zakotyuk, Andriy Annenkov, Oleksandr Svystunov, Eduard Tsykhmeistruk, Oleh Pestryakov, Vitaliy Pushkutsa, Andriy Husin and was coached by Mykhailo Fomenko.

In 1996, CSKA-Borysfen went through another transformation. Just before the start of new 1996–97 season a scandal took place related to ownership. Dmytro Zlobenko was removed from the club which with help of the Army was passed to some businessman by name of Mikhail Grinshpon, a president of "Kyiv–Donbass".

The army-men also managed to appear in the domestic cup's finals twice (1998 and 2001), where they lost both times: first against city-rivals Dynamo Kyiv and then against Shakhtar Donetsk. The club's greatest achievements include a successful UEFA Cup run in the season of 2001–02, defeating the now defunct Finnish side Jokerit and Serbian giants Red Star Belgrade.

Following the disaster in Brovary on 20 April 2000, Mikhail Grinshpon ran from Ukraine. But after Ihor Smeshko became a director of the Security Service of Ukraine in 2003, Grinshpon returned to Ukraine becoming an adviser to director of the State Space Agency of Ukraine.

Since 1999 FC CSKA–Kyiv was headed by Andriy Artemenko until 2000. Along with Oleksandr Omelchenko, Artemenko was one of founders of the Ukrainian political party Yednist.

=== FC Arsenal Kyiv (2001–2013) ===
==== Creation of the club ====
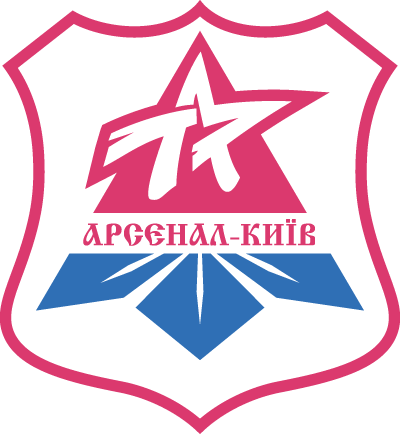
Original Arsenal Kyiv logo containing some FC CSKA Kyiv elements (letter A for "Army" stylized as A and reinterpreted as "Arsenal")

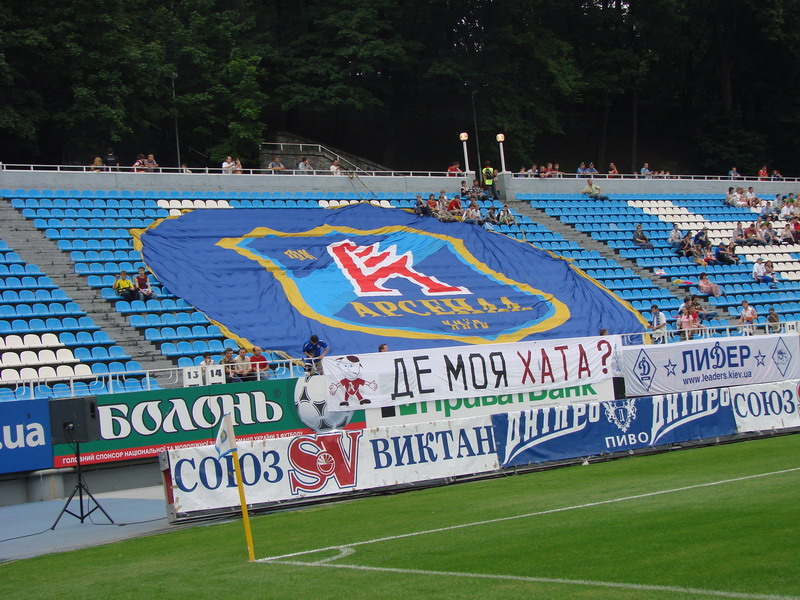
At the Dynamo Stadium in Kyiv (2007), a banner with Arsenal player asking "Where is my home?"

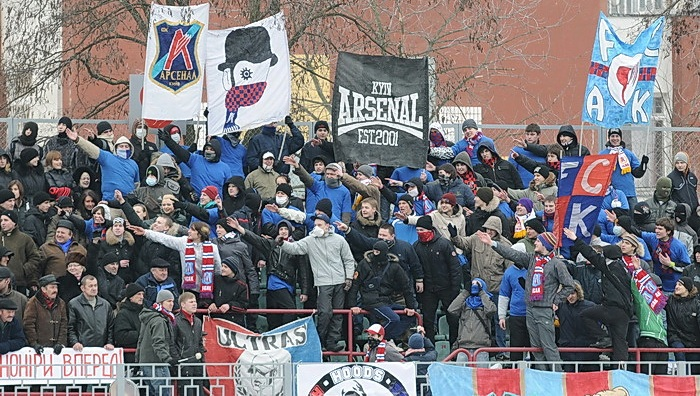
In 2010 fans who claim the Arsenal heritage by year of establishment 2001

Emblem by TMexpert for Arsenal Kyiv (2003–2013)

After the 2000 financial crisis at CSKA, the club, as a state company of the Sports Committee of Ministry of Defense, had its budget cut and was on the brink of being dissolved. On 9 October 2001 Oleksandr Danylchuk was calling rumours and populistic claims when commenting on the declarations about CSKA Kyiv will become Arsenal Kyiv. Transferring of CSKA under jurisdiction of the city authorities is not taking placing. There is no "Arsenal". Not me, nor the Ministry of Defense will make any kind of deal. The words of Oleksandr Omelchenko have no actual confirmations. There is no any commercial entities and no people's deputies who participate in creation of "Arsenal". Those are all empty talks that take place not one year already. During that time, the city did not invest a single dime in the club.

On 19 October 2001 after a meeting with the deputy minister Ivan Bizhan, the city mayor Oleksandr Omelchenko and the CSKA honorary president Oleksandr Danylchuk, it was decided to create on the base of the Army team a new entity, Arsenal Kyiv. On the proposition of CSKA–Kyiv (part of "Unіsport Consaltіng Ltd"), in the same day the Kyiv city mayor Oleksandr Omelchenko issued an order on constituting a limited liability company FC Arsenal Kyiv where 51% of the company owned by the Kyiv city community. The other 49% was still owned by the Ministry of Defense and CSKA as a company. On 8 November 2001 the Kyiv City Council adopted the decision on the creation of the club and increase the constituent fund to 80% (₴9,440), while the other 20% (₴2,360) belonged to other members of the company. The First League second team CSKA-2 Kyiv continued to be affiliated with the Ministry of Defense and once again became the primary team of the Army football club, FC CSKA Kyiv.

Arsenal was created as the Kyiv's city team and fully funded by the Kyiv City Administration with an annual budget of ₴40 million (~US$8 million). Transformation of CSKA into Arsenal was not a single day process and after 1 January 2002 the process was still ongoing. Under the Omelchenko's guardianship Arsenal played at the main national football venue (today Olimpiyskiy National Sports Complex) without any concerns, yet later it was "kicked out" of the capital and for sometime was forced to play in Boryspil or rent the Dynamo's home venues. Omelchenko who was a political opponent of Surkis brothers (Hryhoriy Surkis and Ihor Surkis) insisted that Dynamo should be playing at its home venue Lobanovsky Dynamo Stadium.

While under the city government's ownership, Arsenal struggled financially, resorting to loaning many of its first team's squad players. Soon after election of a new mayor Leonid Chernovetskyi, the city had decreased funding to the club significantly as it sought to reduce its numerous sports holdings and on 13 July 2006 adopted a decision to sell it at auction scheduled on 14 November 2006 and starting at ₴1.1 million. Preparations to sell the club started earlier and no later than 1 June 2006. The initial auction failed to occur and was rescheduled, while the starting was lowered to ₴770,000. In May 2007, it was announced that the club would be demoted due to financial issues, however soon afterwards it was revealed that Arsenal would be purchased by Ukrainian oligarch, Vadim Rabinovich. The new owner started actively financing the club and its transfers. In January 2009 the Mayor of Kyiv Leonid Chernovetskyi bought Arsenal Kyiv for ₴1 from Rabynovich; Chernovetskiy's 30-year-old son Stepan became the club's president. On 20 January 2009 in the newspaper "Ukraynskyi futbol" appeared a "satirical" article about the club's purchase "There will be stadiums on Mars" (На Марсі будуть стадіони?!), which told that the financial transaction of the club was connected with a real estate around the Ukrainian capital. Upon the purchase, the club's situation was critical and there were talks about merger with another Kyiv's club Obolon. The following year Rabinovich bought the club back due to the poor management.

Its European competition season in 2001–02, the club played under the brand of CSKA while de facto for the whole year was known as Arsenal.

==== Bankruptcy in 2013 ====
In 2013, after selling of the club by Rabinovich to Onyshchenko, there started a promotional campaign for revival of historical heritage of another Sports Club Arsenal Kyiv that used to exist at the Kyiv Arsenal Factory trying to connect the old sports club of 1925 with the newly created club of 2001.

In January 2013, the owner Rabynovych stated that the club could be liquidated. According to some sources related to politics, Rabynovych could have been a frontman for Ihor Kolomoiskyi. During the next month it was announced that Ukrainian oligarch Oleksandr Onyshchenko was ready to finance the club and claimed that he had paid all the debts. He also accused the previous leadership of the club of not passing the documents for signing the agreements on the transfer of corporate rights to the club. On 19 June 2013, Onyshchenko announced that he will rename Arsenal back to CSKA and move the club to Boryspil. On 29 August 2013, Rabynovych stated that he had resigned from the post of club president. The next day Onyschenko stated that due to the (then) present situation he could decide not to help the club. On 24 October 2013, Onyschenko stated that he had stopped financing Arsenal. The next day Arsenal failed to appear for a 2013–14 Ukrainian Premier League match against SC Tavriya Simferopol. On 28 October 2013, it again failed to appear for a 2013–14 Ukrainian Cup match against FC Nyva Ternopil. The next day general director Viktor Holovko announced that the club was filing for bankruptcy and withdrawing from competitions as it was unable to find any sponsors.

On 15 November 2013, FC Shakhtar Donetsk Chairman Rinat Akhmetov announced that after financial help from the other teams in the league; the Arsenal squad would be able to complete its 2013–14 Ukrainian Premier League season. But the next day Dnipro Dnipropetrovsk refused to (re)play the (16th round) match Arsenal had earlier failed to appear for (due to its bankruptcy). On 21 November 2013, the FFU Control and Disciplinary Committee adopted its decision to disqualify "Arsenal" in accordance to the regulation statement about failure to show for two calendar (scheduled) games.

=== FC Arsenal-Kyiv (2014–2019) ===
==== Reorganization in 2014 ====
The Arsenal team that was re-founded in 2001 went bankrupt in late 2013, but the club was soon reformed and currently plays as an amateur team in the Kyiv City League competition.

In January 2014 an initiative group of former club players and fans with the help of Kyiv businessman and rally driver Oleksiy Kikireshko re-established the club as FC Arsenal-Kyiv.

After its last game of the 2014 Kyiv city championship on 9 November 2014, which was won by FC Arsenal-Kyiv, the club's president Kikireshko announced that the club submitted a preliminary application on participation in the Ukrainian Second League for the 2015–16 Ukrainian Second League season. It was accepted.

The club appointed Andriy Annenkov in February 2014, but he resigned after an unsuccessful start to a new season on 8 August 2015.

==== Return to the Ukrainian Premier League ====
In February 2018, it became known that a new president of the club and its co-owner became the club's former player from Croatia Ivica Pirić. The other 50% of the club belong to a former football referee Oleksandr Moskalenko.

On 28 April 2018, FC Arsenal Kyiv announced that since the next season it could be called FC Arsenal-CSKA Kyiv. Later the club's director Oleksandr Moskalenko told that the club will play at Bannikov Stadium if it gets promoted to the 2018–19 Ukrainian Premier League. The stadium however does not meet the league's threshold requirements for the minimum capacity.

During the winter of 2018–19 FC Arsenal-Kyiv was involved in business conflict over its home base which is connected with the Russian financial institution Sberbank. FC Arsenal-Kyiv shares its home base in Shchaslyve with the Shakhtar football academy.

== Supporters and rivalries ==
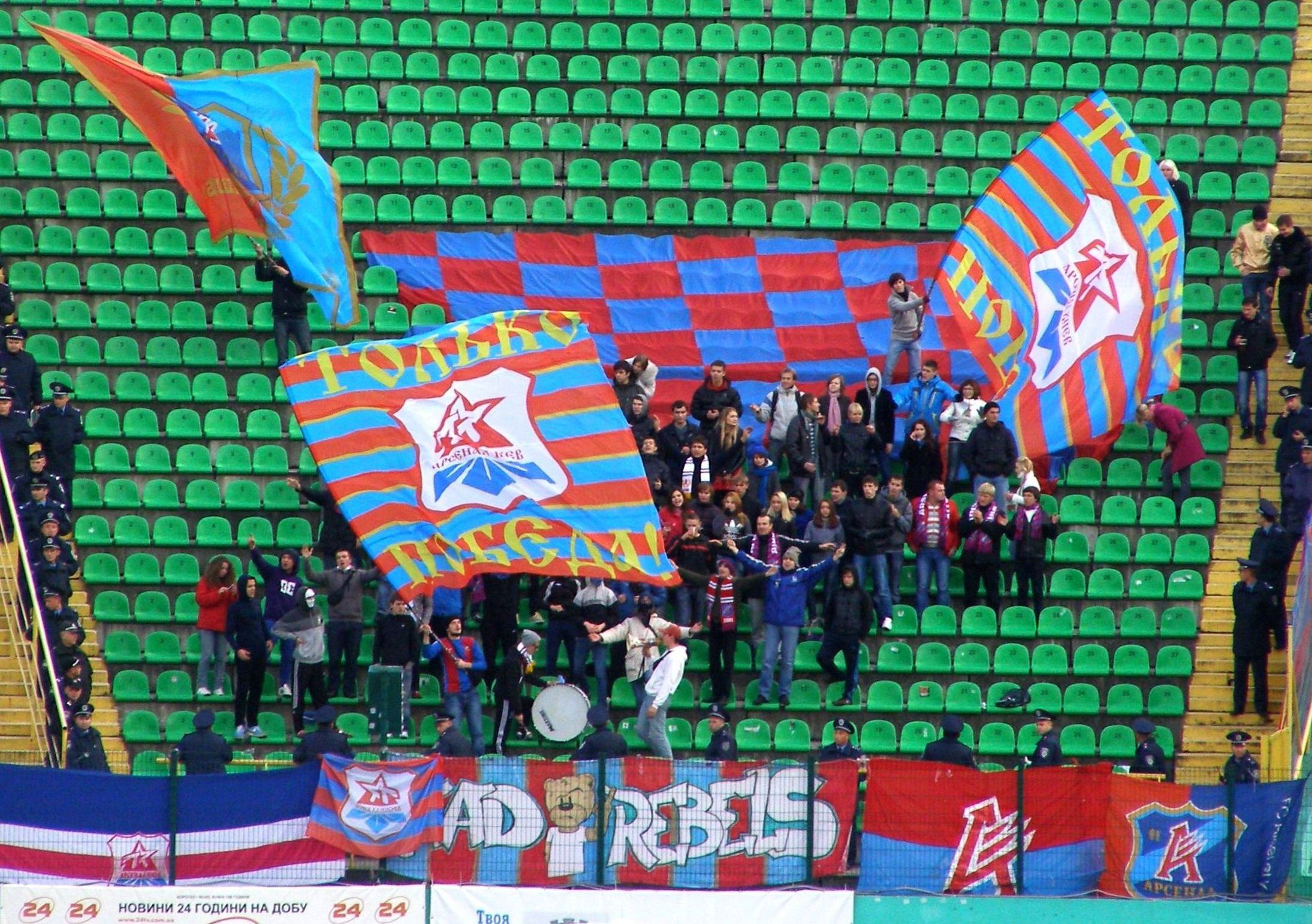
in Lviv (2011), logo of "Arsenal–Army" with letter A stylized as star

Due to predominant right-wing football supporters in Ukraine, the Arsenal supporters "Mad Rebels" lean strongly towards the anti-fascist movement and in the majority perceived as left-wing supporters. Colors of the Arsenal fans coincide with those of the Ukrainian Soviet Socialist Republic's flag, while the Kyiv Arsenal factory is associated with pro-Bolshevik sentiment during the Kiev Arsenal January Uprising in 1918 following which Kyiv was overrun by the armed forces of Soviet Russia. The Arsenal supporters could also be associated with Partizan Minsk who have similar political beliefs. Arsenal fans were interviewed by the BBC in 2012 for a documentary on football hooliganism called Stadiums of Hate, before the UEFA Euro 2012, however their interviews were omitted from the final edit, leading some people to criticise the BBC for ignoring them in order to push their message of fascism further.

Arsenal's archrivals are the majority nationalist and right-wing Dynamo Kyiv, with whom they contest the Kyiv derby. They also have a rivalry with the other Kyiv team, CSKA Kyiv, not only along political lines but also due to the controversial intertwining of the two club's histories. Other fierce rivals are Karpaty Lviv and FC Dnipro.

== Stadiums and home fields ==
The original and first home stadium became Kolos Stadium. The club's main training facility are located in one of Kyiv's suburbs Shchaslyve, just outside of the Kyiv's city limits on the way towards Boryspil.

In 1995, the club became affiliated with the Armed Forces of Ukraine as CSKA-Borysfen and played at CSK ZSU Stadium which belongs to the Central Sports Club of the Armed Forces of Ukraine.

In 2001 after becoming the Kyiv municipal team the club "pushed" out of Olimpiyskiy National Sports Complex, the leader of Ukrainian football, FC Dynamo Kyiv and reserved the arena until its renovations in 2008 for its preparation to the Euro 2012.

Later Arsenal played at various smaller stadiums such as Bannikov Stadium, Obolon Arena, and others.

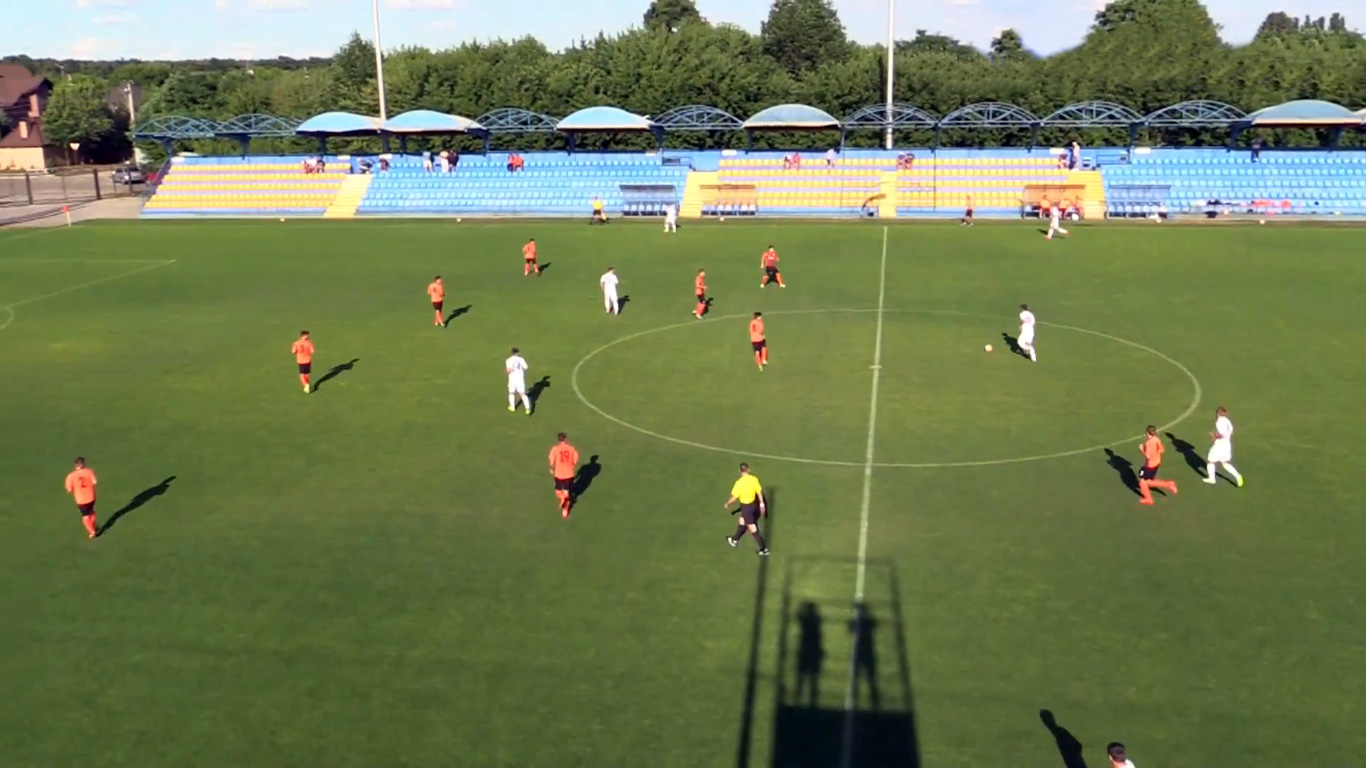
Arsenal Arena (formerly Knyazha Arena)

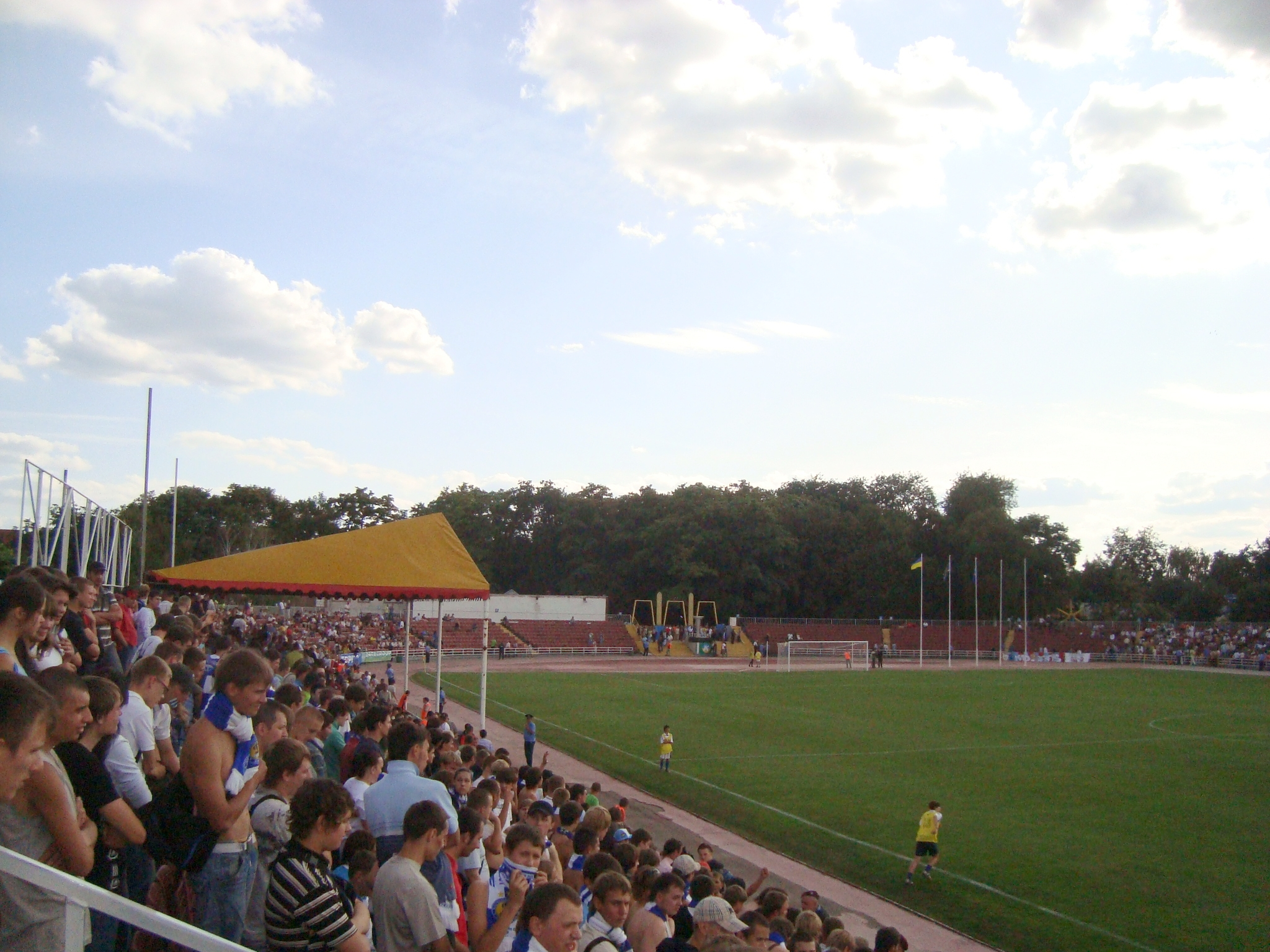
Kolos Stadium

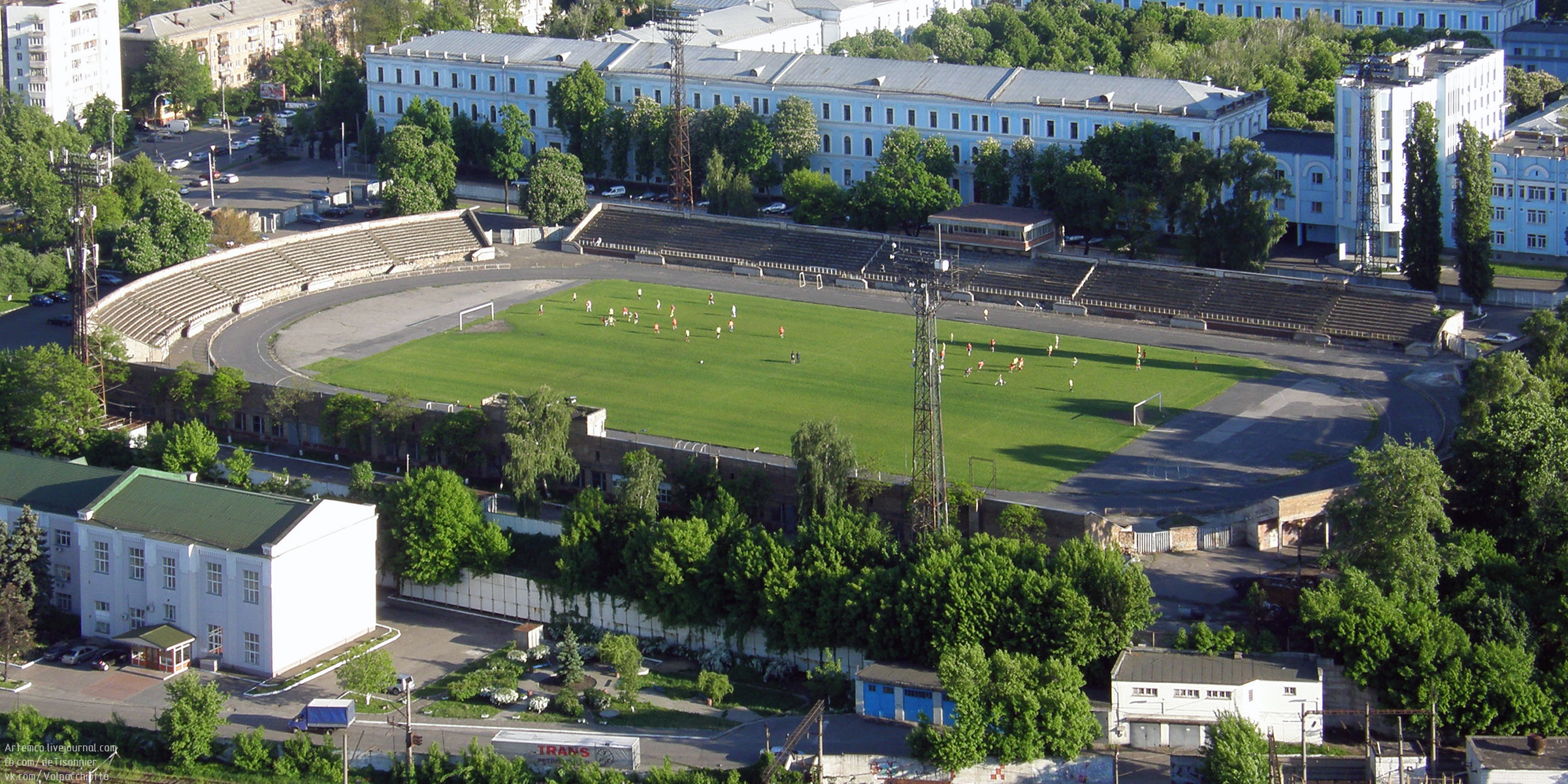
CSK ZSU Stadium (1993-2001)

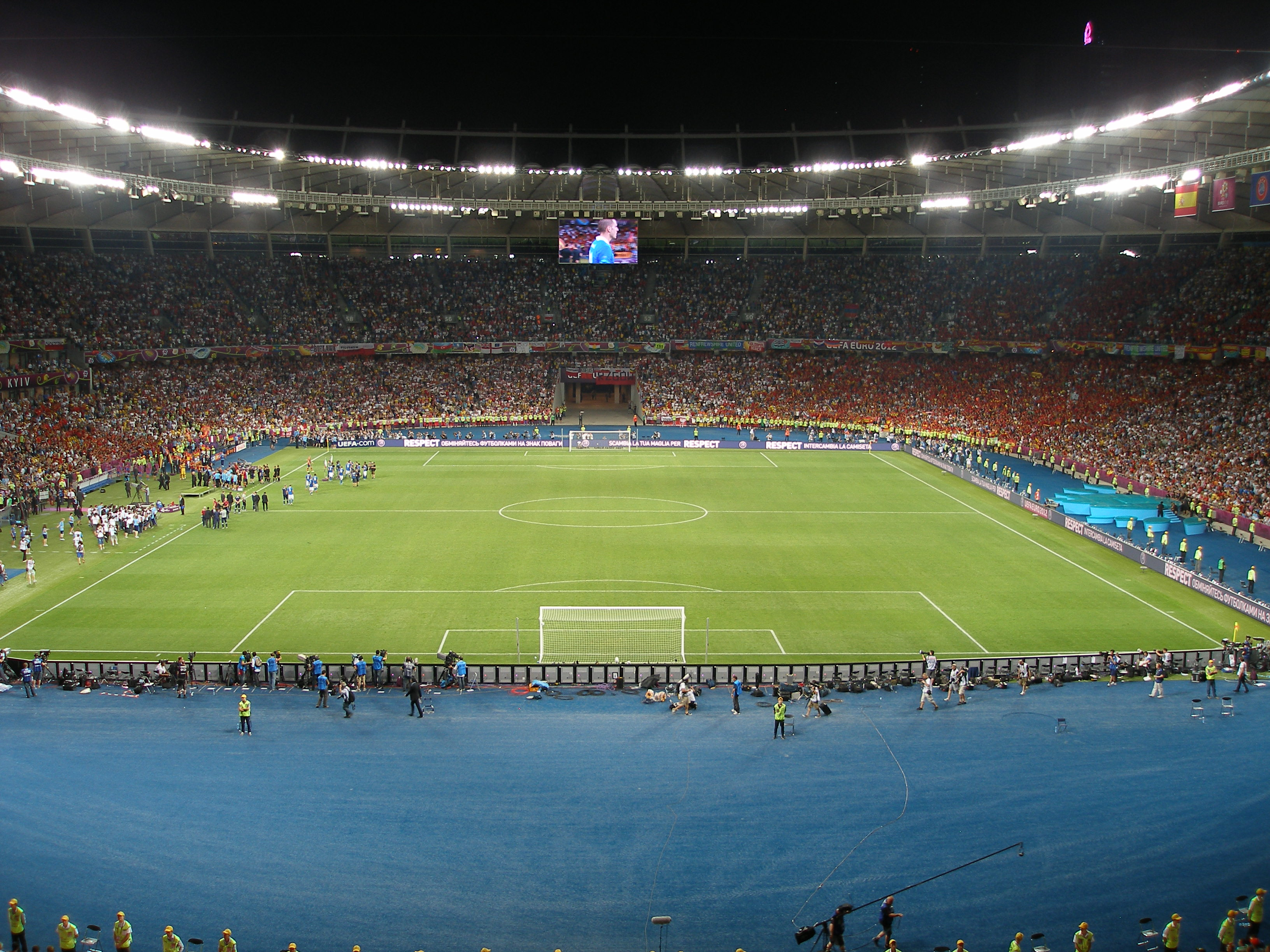
Olimpiyskiy National Sports Complex

== Football kits and sponsors ==
Years	Football kit	Shirt sponsor	Note
pre-2001	Refer to CSKA Kyiv		
2001–2002	Nike	ukrgasbank	as Arsenal Kyiv
2003–04	Nike	adidas	as Arsenal Kyiv
2004–07	Nike	–	as Arsenal Kyiv
2007–09	Lotto	–	as Arsenal Kyiv
2009–10	Nike	–	as Arsenal Kyiv
2010–13	Nike	News One	as Arsenal Kyiv
2013–18	Nike	–	as Arsenal Kyiv
2018–19	Zeus sport	Favorit Sport	as Arsenal Kyiv

== Presidents ==
- 1993–1995: NPF Geoton Boryspil (Dmytro Zlobenko) as FC Borysfen Boryspil → FC Boryspil → FC Borysfen Boryspil → FC CSKA–Borysfen Kyiv
- 1995–1998: Kyiv–Donbass (Mikhail Grinshpon) as FC CSCA–Kyiv
- 1998–1999: Kyiv–Donbass (Viktor Topolov)
- 1999–2000: Andriy Artemenko
- 2000-2001: Unіsport Consaltіng Ltd (Oleksandr Danylchuk)
- 2001–2007: Kyiv city administration (Oleksandr Omelchenko and Leonid Chernovetskyi, team transformed into Arsenal Kyiv)
- 2007–2013: Vadym Rabinovych
- 2013: Oleksandr Onyshchenko (club dissolved)
- 2014–2018: Oleksiy Kikireshko (club was reestablished as Arsenal-Kyiv)
- 2018: Ivica Pirić (co-owner)

== Final coaches and administration ==
Administration	Coaching (senior team)	Coaching (U-21 team)
President – (Croatia) Ivica Pirić; Vice-president – (Ukraine) Ruslan Korzh; Director – (Ukraine) Oleksandr Moskalenko; Academy Director – (Ukraine) Oleksandr Synyookyi	Head coach – (Ukraine) Ihor Leonov; Assistant coach – (Ukraine) Oleksiy Velychko; Fitness coach – (Ukraine) Oleksiy Skorpan; Goalkeeping coach – (Serbia) Milan Stojković	Senior coach – (Ukraine) RUSLAN Kinashenko; Assistant coach – (Ukraine) RUSLAN Kinashenko; Assistant coach – (Ukraine) RUSLAN Kinashenko; Fitness coach – (Ukraine); Goalkeeping coach – (Ukraine)

== Honours ==
=== Soviet factory team ===
As "Mashynobudivnyk Kyiv"

- Championship of the Ukrainian SSR
  - Winners (2): 1954, 1958

=== Ukrainian team ===
As "FC Boryspil"

- Ukrainian Second League
  - Winners (1): 1993–94

As "CSKA-Borysfen"

- Ukrainian First League
  - Runner up (1): 1994–95

As "CSKA Kyiv"

- Ukrainian Cup
  - Runner up (2): 1998, 2001

As "Arsenal Kyiv"

- Ukrainian First League
  - Winners (1): 2017–18

== League and cup history ==
=== Soviet Union (Mashynobudivnyk–Arsenal) ===
Season	Div.	Pos.	Pl.	W	D	L	GS	GA	P	Domestic Cup	Europe	Notes
Mashynobudivnyk
1949	Republican; 4th	3 (Zone 1)	Information is missing									
1950-51	Information is missing											
1952	Republican First Group; 4th	3 (Zone 1)	22	13	7	5	73	20	33			
1953	Republican; 4th	2 (Zone 4)	10	8	0	2	22	8	16			
Zenit
1954	Republican; 4th	1 (Zone 1)	10	7	2	1	45	9	16			qualified
1954	Republican; 4th	1	6	5	0	1	10	2	10			Lost promotion playoff with ODO Kyiv; Champion of Ukraine
Mashynobudivnyk
1955	Republican; 4th	1 (Zone 1)	14	13	0	1	41	6	26			qualified
1955	Republican; 4th	6	7	0	4	3	10	14	4			
1956	Republican; 4th	1 (Zone 1)	14	12	0	2	57	12	24			qualified
1956	Republican; 4th	2	6	3	3	0	10	5	9			Lost championship playoff with Shakhtar K
1957	Republican; 4th	1 (Zone 1)	10	8	1	1	30	10	17			qualified
1957	Republican; 4th	3	8	3	3	2	17	10	9			
1958	Republican; 4th	1 (Zone 1)	13	10	3	0	61	12	23			qualified
1958	Republican; 4th	2 (Group 1)	5	3	1	1	8	5	7			qualified
1958	Republican; 4th	1	3	2	1	0	5	2	5			Lost promotion playoff with Chornomorets; Champion of Ukraine
Arsenal
1959	Class B 2nd	5 (Zone 2)	28	13	8	7	49	37	34			
1960	Class B of UkrSSR; 2nd	3 (Zone 1)	32	17	9	6	59	29	43			Won relegation playoff with Oktyabrskyi Raion Kyiv
1961	Class B of UkrSSR; 2nd	15 (Zone 1)	34	10	9	15	49	45	29			Lost playoff with Avanhard K/R; Won relegation playoff with Temp Kyiv
1962	Class B of UkrSSR; 2nd	7 (Zone 1)	24	5	13	6	18	19	23			qualified
1962	Class B of UkrSSR; 2nd	22 (Places 18–28)	10	4	2	4	16	11	10			Relegated
1963	Class B of UkrSSR; 3rd	10 (Zone 1)	38	13	10	15	38	39	36			Lost playoff to Dniprovets; Withdrew

=== Ukraine ===
==== Borysfen–CSKA–Arsenal ====
Season	Div.	Pos.	Pl.	W	D	L	GS	GA	P	Domestic Cup	Europe		Notes
Nyva–Borysfen
1992–93	Transitional League; 3rd (lower)	4	34	19	7	8	45	28	45				Promoted
Borysfen
1993–94	Second League; 3rd	1	42	26	13	3	84	28	65				Relocated to Boryspil; in the second half FC Boryspil; Promoted
CSKA–Borysfen
1994–95	First League; 2nd	2	42	26	9	7	73	31	87				Merged with CSCA Kyiv; Promoted
1995–96	Top League; 1st	4	34	15	11	8	47	27	56	1/16 finals			
CSKA
1996–97	Top League; 1st	11	30	9	8	13	33	35	35	1/2 finals			
1997–98	Top League; 1st	13	30	9	6	15	30	35	33	Runner-up			
1998–99	Top League; 1st	7	30	11	10	9	37	35	43	1/8 finals	CWC	1st round	
1999–00	Top League; 1st	10	30	9	8	13	31	36	35	1/4 finals			
2000–01	Top League; 1st	6	26	10	10	6	30	23	40	Runner-up			
Arsenal (mid-season name change)
2001–02	Top League; 1st	12	26	6	5	15	18	28	23	1/4 finals	UC	2nd round	
2002–03	Top League; 1st	5	30	16	8	6	24	25	56	1/4 finals			
2003–04	Top League; 1st	9	30	10	7	13	38	44	37	1/8 finals			
2004–05	Top League; 1st	9	30	9	10	11	30	33	37	1/16 finals			
2005–06	Top League; 1st	12	30	9	8	13	31	39	35	1/4 finals			
2006–07	Top League; 1st	14	30	7	9	14	28	44	30	1/32 finals			
2007–08	Top League; 1st	6	30	11	9	10	42	36	42	1/8 finals			
2008–09	Premier League; 1st	11	30	8	8	14	26	33	32	1/8 finals			
2009–10	Premier League; 1st	7	30	11	9	10	44	41	42	1/16 finals			
2010–11	Premier League; 1st	9	30	10	7	13	36	38	37	1/2 finals			
2011–12	Premier League; 1st	5	30	14	9	7	44	27	51	1/4 finals			
2012–13	Premier League; 1st	8	30	10	9	11	34	41	39	1/4 finals	EL	3rd qual round	
2013–14	Premier League; 1st	—	14	3	1	10	10	31	10	1/8 finals			Expelled

==== Arsenal—Kyiv ====
Season	Div.	Pos.	Pl.	W	D	L	GS	GA	P	Domestic Cup	Europe	Notes
2014	Kyiv Oblast; 5th	10	13	8	1	4	25	22	25	Amateur Cup		also participated in the Kyiv city championship
2015–16	Second League; 3rd	6	26	13	4	9	37	30	43	1/16 finals		Promoted
2016–17	First League; 2nd	10	34	12	9	13	38	39	45	1/16 finals		
2017–18	First League; 2nd	1	34	23	6	5	59	23	75	1/8 finals		Promoted
2018–19	Premier League; 1st	12	32	7	5	20	26	56	26	1/16 finals		Dissolved

== European competitions ==
Arsenal Kyiv appeared in the European competitions for the first time as CSKA Kyiv in 1998 (1998–99 UEFA Cup Winners' Cup) in away game against the Irish Cork City F.C. which CSKA lost 1–2. The first two qualifications to European competitions were achieved by reaching the final of the Ukrainian Cup in 1998 and 2001. During that time Arsenal Kyiv was known as CSKA Kyiv.

The first appearance in the European competitions under Arsenal brand the club made in 2012.

=== CSKA Kyiv ===
UEFA Cup Winners Cup

Season	Round	Club	Home	Away	Aggr.
1998–99	Qualifying round	(Republic of Ireland) Cork City	2–0	1–2	3–2
	First Round	(Russia) Lokomotiv Moscow	0–2	1–3	1–5

UEFA Europa League

Season	Round	Club	Home	Away	Aggr.
2001–02	Qualifying round	(Finland) FC Jokerit	2–0	2–0	4–0
	First round	(Serbia and Montenegro) Red Star Belgrade	3–2	0–0	3–2
	Second round	(Belgium) Club Brugge K.V.	0–2	0–5	0–7

=== Arsenal Kyiv ===
UEFA Europa League

Season	Round	Club	Home	Away	Aggr.
2012–13	Third qualifying round	(Slovenia) ND Mura 05	0–3^{1}	2–0	2–3

Notes

- Note 1: UEFA awarded Mura 05 a 3–0 win due to Arsenal Kyiv fielding a suspended player in the first leg. The original match had ended in a 3–0 win for Arsenal Kyiv.

== Managers ==
- (Ukraine) Viktor Kolotov (1993)
- (Ukraine) Volodymyr Bezsonov (1994)
- (Ukraine) Mykhailo Fomenko (1994–1996)
- (Ukraine) Viktor Chanov (1996) (caretaker)
- (Ukraine) Volodymyr Lozynskyi (1996–1997)
- (Ukraine) Serhiy Morozov (1997)
- (Ukraine) Oleksandr Shtelin (1997–1998)
- (Ukraine) Volodymyr Bezsonov (1998–2000)
- (Ukraine) Mykhailo Fomenko (2000–2001)
- (Ukraine) Oleh Kuznetsov (1 July 2001 – 30 June 2002)
- (Ukraine) Vyacheslav Hroznyi (1 July 2002 – 30 June 2004)
- (Ukraine) Oleksandr Baranov (1 July 2004 – 1 Nov 2005)
- (Ukraine) Oleksandr Zavarov (10 Nov 2005 – 28 Jan 2010)
- (Ukraine) Vyacheslav Hroznyi (28 Jan 2010 – 16 April 2010)
- (Ukraine) Yuriy Bakalov (interim) (22 April 2010 – 18 May 2010)
- (Ukraine) Yuriy Bakalov (18 May 2010 – 29 May 2011)
- (Belarus) Leonid Kuchuk (2 June 2011 – 31 Dec 2012)
- (Ukraine) Yuriy Bakalov (5 Jan 2013 – 21 Nov 2013)
- (Ukraine) Serhiy Zakarlyuka (22 Nov 2013 – 31 Jan 2014) (caretaker)
- (Ukraine) Andriy Annenkov (1 Feb 2014 – 8 Aug 2015)
- (Bulgaria) Angel Chervenkov (13 Aug 2015 – 15 Dec 2015)
- (Ukraine) Serhiy Litovchenko (23 Dec 2015 – 22 Jun 2018)
- (Italy) Fabrizio Ravanelli (22 Jun 2018 – 22 Sep 2018)
- (Ukraine) Vladyslav Humenyuk (22 Sep 2018 – 1 Oct 2018) (caretaker)
- (Ukraine) Vyacheslav Hroznyi (1 Oct 2018 – 9 Jan 2019)
- (Ukraine) Ihor Leonov (16 Jan 2019 – June 2019)

== Arsenal–2 ==
FC Arsenal-2 Kyiv was a Ukrainian football team based in Kyiv, Ukraine. Like most tributary teams, the best players are sent up to the senior team, meanwhile developing other players for further call-ups.

The team appeared once in the 2003–04 Ukrainian Second League serving as a junior (reserve) squad for the FC Arsenal Kyiv franchise. It was allowed to skip amateur competitions, but was withdrawn after a season. The team did not perform well and withdrew before the end of the season, placing the dead last.

== See also ==
- FC CSKA Kyiv
