= 1993 Ukrainian Cup final =

- Event: 1992-93 Ukrainian Cup
Dynamo Kyiv	Karpaty Lviv
2	1
- Date: 30 May 1993
- Venue: Republican Stadium, Kyiv
- Referee: Volodymyr Pyanykh (Donetsk)
- Attendance: 47,000
- Weather: 9°C

The 1993 Ukrainian Cup final was a football match that took place at the Republican Stadium on 30 May 1993. The match was the second final of national cup competition and it was contested by FC Dynamo Kyiv and FC Karpaty Lviv. The 1993 Ukrainian Cup Final was also the second to be held in the Ukrainian capital Kyiv. Dynamo won the match 2–1 with goals from Viktor Leonenko and the former Karpaty player Dmytro Topchiyev.

The match also had only one yellow card issued to Mokrytskyi (Karpaty). One of the very few Ukrainian Cup finals where there were no foreign players.

== Road to Kyiv ==
Both teams started from the first round of the competition (1/16). Unlike Dynamo that travelled to Western Ukraine on three occasions before meeting with the former runner-up of the Ukrainian Cup, FC Metalist Kharkiv, and didn't meet any resistance along the way; Karpaty had a much more difficult road. Lvivians travelled to the South at first and then for the two next rounds they traveled to Zaporizhzhia. Surprisingly Karpaty had not much of a problem with neither Metalurh nor Torpedo. Karpaty gained a great momentum before going to the Final after the previous couple of rounds and were considered to be great challengers.

Dynamo Kyiv

Round 1 (1st leg)	Sokil	0–7	Dynamo
Round 1 (2nd leg)	Dynamo	3–0	Sokil
	(Dynamo won 10–0 on aggregate)		
Round 2 (1st leg)	Prykarpattia	0–2	Dynamo
Round 2 (2nd leg)	Dynamo	4–1	Prykarpattia
	(Dynamo won 6–1 on aggregate)		
Quarter-final (1st leg)	Dynamo	5–1	Volyn
Quarter-final (2nd leg)	Volyn	2–2	Dynamo
	(Dynamo won 7–3 on aggregate)		
Semi-final (1st leg)	Metalist	1–1	Dynamo
Semi-final (2nd leg)	Dynamo	3–0	Metalist
	(Dynamo won 4–1 on aggregate)		

Metalist Kharkiv

Round 1 (1st leg)	Evis	1–0	Karpaty
Round 1 (2nd leg)	Karpaty	3–0	Evis
	(Karpaty won 3–1 on aggregate)		
Round 2 (1st leg)	Odesa	0–0	Karpaty
Round 2 (2nd leg)	Karpaty	3–2	Odesa
	(Karpaty won 3–2 on aggregate)		
Quarter-final (1st leg)	Metalurh	0–1	Karpaty
Quarter-final (2nd leg)	Karpaty	2–1	Metalurh
	(Karpaty won 3–1 on aggregate)		
Semi-final (1st leg)	Torpedo	0–1	Karpaty
Semi-final (2nd leg)	Karpaty	2–1	Torpedo
	(Karpaty won 3–1 on aggregate)		

== Match details ==
30 May 1993
??:?? LST

Dynamo Kyiv	2 – 1	Karpaty Lviv
Leonenko 23'; Topchiyev 64'	Report	Plotko 89' (pen.)

Republican Stadium, Kyiv
Attendance: 47000
Referee: Volodymyr Pyanykh (Donetsk), (FIFA)

Dynamo Kyiv	Karpaty Lviv

Dynamo Kyiv:
GK	?	(Ukraine) Ihor Kutepov
MF	?	(Ukraine) Oleh Luzhnyi (c)
DF	?	(Ukraine) Vitaliy Ponomarenko
DF	?	(Ukraine) Vyacheslav Khruslov	(substituted off) 85'
DF	?	(Ukraine) Serhiy Shmatovalenko
MF	?	(Ukraine) Serhii Rebrov	(substituted off) 40'
DF	?	(Ukraine) Andriy Annenkov
DF	?	(Ukraine) Yuriy Hrytsyna	(substituted off) 64'
MF	?	(Ukraine) Dmytro Topchiyev	64'
FW	?	(Ukraine) Viktor Leonenko	23'
FW	?	(Ukraine) Anatoli Bezsmertny
Substitutes:
DF	?	(Ukraine) Volodymyr Sharan	(substituted in) 85'
MF	?	(Ukraine) Serhiy Kovalets	(substituted in) 40'
FW	?	(Ukraine) Pavlo Shkapenko	(substituted in) 64'
Manager:
(Ukraine) Mykhailo Fomenko

Karpaty Lviv:
GK	?	(Ukraine) Bohdan Strontsitskyi
DF	?	(Ukraine) Serhiy Romanyshyn
MF	?	(Ukraine) Oleksandr Chyzhevskyi
MF	?	(Ukraine) Andriy Husin
MF	?	(Ukraine) Yuriy Mokrytskyi (c)	(yellow card) 56'
FW	?	(Ukraine) Anatoliy Petryk
DF	?	(Ukraine) Vasyl Kardash
DF	?	(Ukraine) Vasyl Leskiv
MF	?	(Ukraine) Yuriy Shulyatytskyi	(substituted off) 46'
FW	?	(Ukraine) Ihor Plotko
DF	?	(Ukraine) Mykhaylo Stelmakh	(substituted off) 77'
Substitutes:
DF	?	(Ukraine) Mykola Kalishchuk	(substituted in) 46'
FW	?	(Ukraine) Dmytro Mazur	(substituted in) 77'
Manager:
(Ukraine) Myron Markevych

MATCH OFFICIALS

- Assistant referees:
  - Stepan Selmenskyi (Uzhhorod)
  - Viktor Holovko (Dnipropetrovsk)
- Fourth official: Ihor Yaremchuk (Kyiv)

MATCH RULES

- 90 minutes.
- 30 minutes of extra-time if necessary.
- Penalty shoot-out if scores still level.
- Seven named substitutes
- Maximum of 3 substitutions.

Ukrainian Cup 1993 Winners

FC Dynamo Kyiv
First title

== Match statistics ==
	Dynamo	Karpaty
Total shots	?	?
Shots on target	?	?
Ball possession	?%	?%
Corner kicks	?	?
Fouls committed	?	?
Offsides	?	?
Yellow cards	?	?
Red cards	?	?

== See also ==
- Ukrainian Cup 1992-93
