= Oleksiy Velychko =

Ukrainian football manager

Personal information
- Full name: Oleksiy Vasylyovych Velychko
- Date of birth: March 30, 1954 (age 72)
- Place of birth: Soviet Union

Team information
- Current team: Arsenal Kyiv (assistant)

Managerial career
- Years: Team
- 2002–2004: Arsenal Kyiv (assistant/team's chief)
- 2005–2006: Metalurh Zaporizhia (assistant)
- 2008–2009: Terek Grozny (assistant)
- 2010: Arsenal Kyiv (assistant)
- 2011–2012: Tobol Kustanai (assistant)
- 2013–2016: Hoverla Uzhhorod (assistant)
- 2015: Hoverla Uzhhorod (interim)
- 2018–: Arsenal Kyiv (assistant)

Oleksiy Vasylyovych Velychko (Ukrainian: Олексій Васильович Величко; born March 30, 1954) is an assistant coach in Arsenal Kyiv. He was a temporary manager for Hoverla in 2015 after the resignation of Vyacheslav Hroznyi.
