= Ivica Pirić =

Croatian footballer

Personal information
- Date of birth: 24 January 1977 (age 49)
- Place of birth: Split, SR Croatia, Yugoslavia
- Height: 1.84 m (6 ft 0 in)
- Position: Midfielder

Senior career*
Years	Team	Apps	(Gls)
	Hajduk Split	0	(0)
1998–1999	SSV Ulm 1846	0	(0)
1999–2002	NK Zagreb	54	(0)
2002–2008	Arsenal Kyiv	72	(0)
2003	→ Hajduk Split (loan)	6	(0)
2004	→ CSKA Kyiv (loan)	2	(0)
2008–2009	Trogir	18	(0)
2009–2010	RNK Split	27	(1)
- * Club domestic league appearances and goals as of 25 May 2011

Ivica Pirić (born 24 January 1977) is a Croatian sports director, business executive and retired football player who played as a midfielder.

Pirić is also a political activist. In 2018, he became a president and a co-owner of the revived FC Arsenal-Kyiv.

== Career ==
He is a persona non grata in Russia and is not allowed to enter that country. Pirić calls Ukraine his second homeland and in summer of 2015 organized humanitarian actions helping re-settlers from the eastern Ukraine, particularly children. With his help some 300 children from Ukraine had a chance to spend their summer in Omiš.
