= Kolos Stadium (Boryspil) =

Multifunctional facility located in Boryspil, Kyiv Oblast, Ukraine

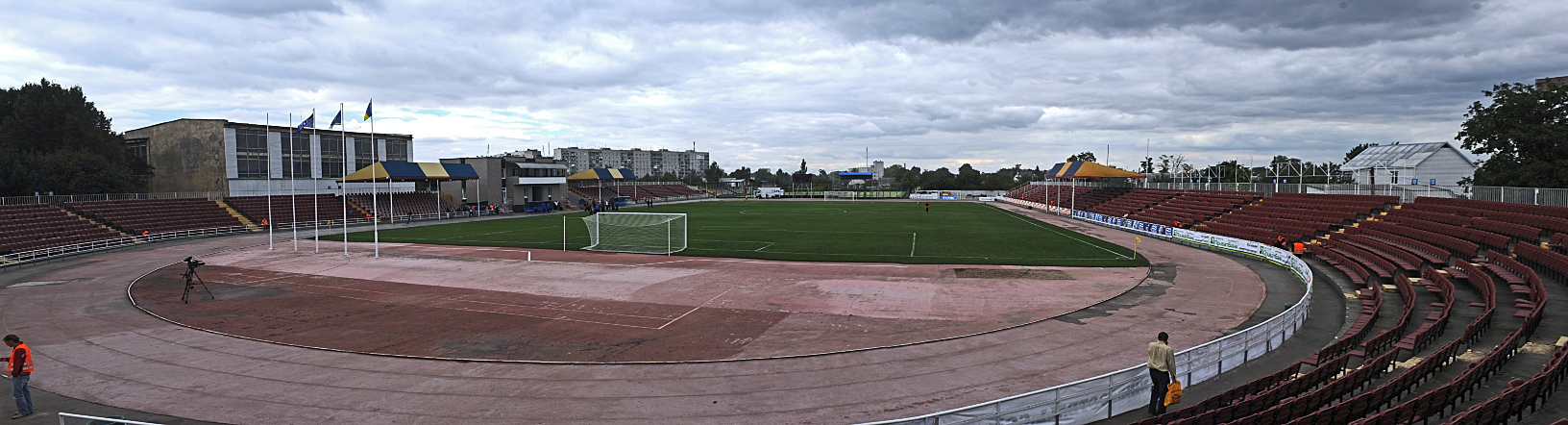
- Interactive map of Kolos Stadium
- Location: Boryspil, Ukraine
- Coordinates: 50°21′14.7″N 30°57′07.8″E
- Owner: Boryspil Kolos sports society
- Capacity: 5,654
- Surface: Grass
- Field size: 105 m × 69 m (115 yd × 75 yd)

Construction
- Groundbreaking: late 1940s
- Opened: 1950s
- Renovated: 1997

Tenants
- Borysfen Boryspil; CSKA/Arsenal Kyiv

Kolos Stadium is a multifunctional facility, primarily used for football located in Boryspil, Kyiv Oblast, Ukraine. Beside the football field, the main arena has a running track and extra room to hold other Olympic sports events if necessary. The facility is owned by the local Kolos sports society. The football arena is often used by various Ukrainian national junior football teams. The Ukrainian Premier League football club Arsenal Kyiv played their home games at the stadium.

The stadium is also part of a sports complex, which includes a smaller field hockey arena, where the local hockey club Kolos plays.

== History ==
Initially, the football field appeared in 1935, when the playground was encircled by a round mound. As a stadium, it was officially constructed after the Second World War and had a capacity of 7,500 spectators. In 1997, the facility was reconstructed and modernized with individual seating as well as changing rooms, a special medical room, massage facilities, and a new parking area.

The capacity was reduced to 5,654 with approximately 2,000 covered seats.

The hockey facility has a separate arena which is uses a synthetic turf and a small covered stadium with a capacity for 1,500 spectators.

=== Football usage ===
From the start of the Ukrainian Premier League 2009–10 season Arsenal Kyiv plays their home games at the stadium. Borysfen Boryspil also used the stadium as their home ground until the club folded in 2007. Other clubs to have used this facility include: Knyazha Schaslyve, CSCA Kyiv and their reserve team, FC Dynamo-2 Kyiv, FC Dynamo-3 Kyiv. The stadium also hosted playoff games for promotion to the Ukrainian First League 1998-99 between Prykarpattia Ivano-Frankivsk and Cherkasy as well as women's, youth and junior internationals. The record attendance for a game is 6,500 when Borysfen Boryspil hosted Dynamo Kyiv on April 9, 2005.

== Gallery ==
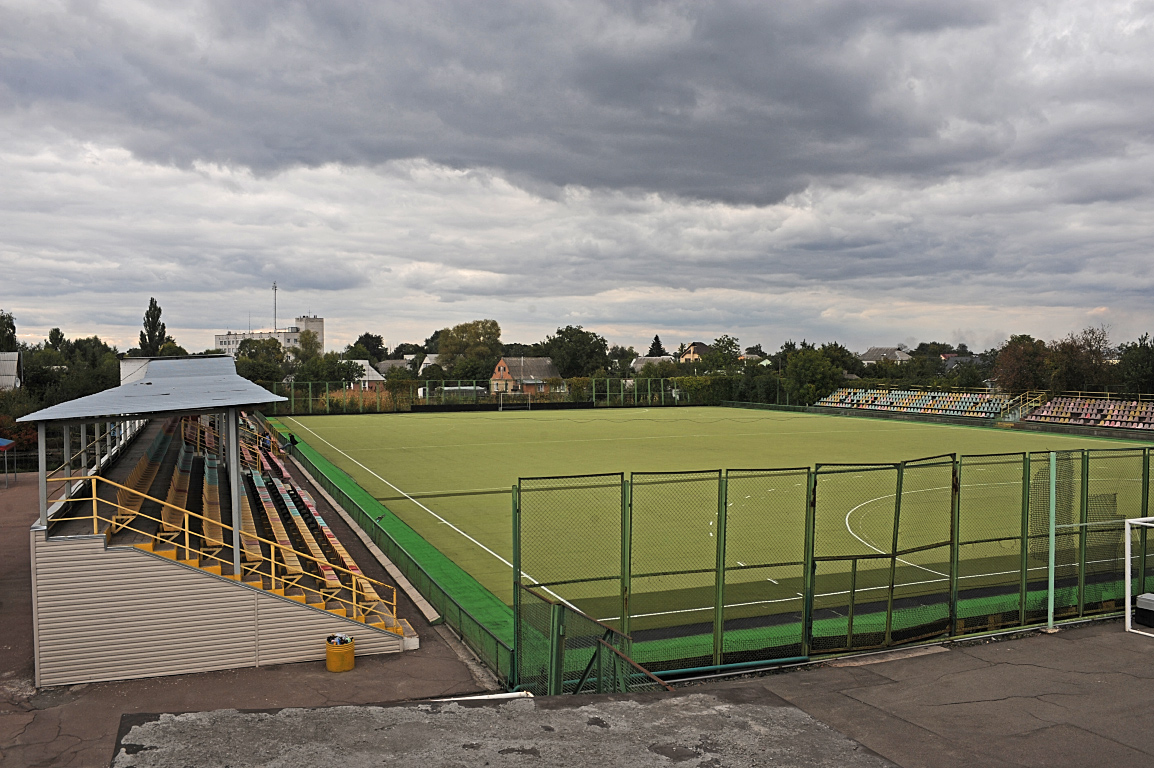
Artificial turf field for field hockey

Panoramic view of the main stadium

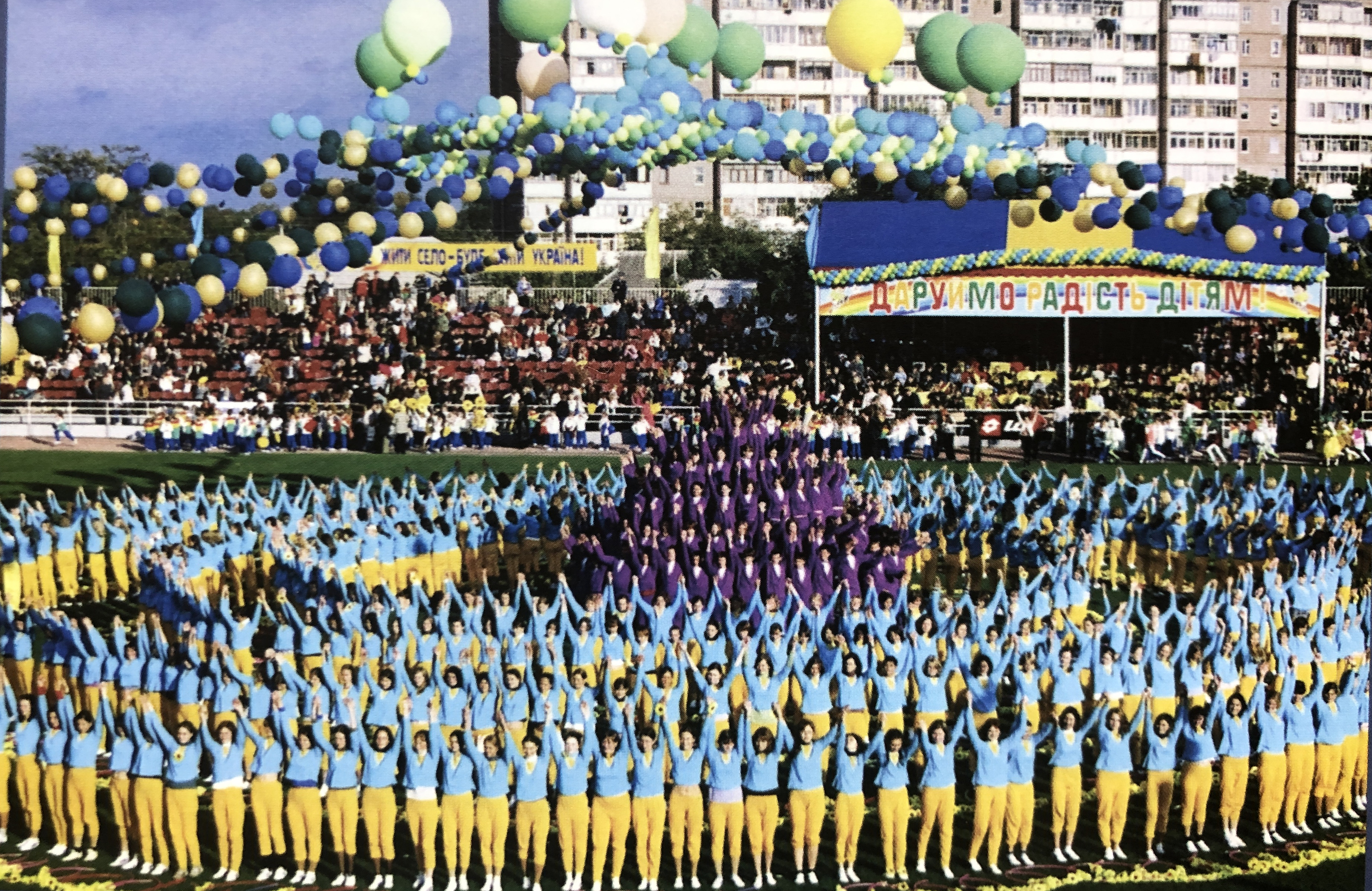
The 2005 celebrations of the 55th anniversary of the Kolos sports society of the Ukrainian Agro-Industrial Complex
