= Oleksandr Svystunov =

Ukrainian footballer (born 1973)

Personal information
- Full name: Oleksandr Viktorovych Svystunov
- Date of birth: 30 August 1973 (age 53)
- Place of birth: Yalta, Ukrainian SSR
- Height: 1.78 m (5 ft 10 in)
- Position: Midfielder

Senior career*
Years	Team	Apps	(Gls)
1990–1992	Tavriya Simferopol	9	(0)
1992–1993	Polissya Zhytomyr	26	(1)
1993–1995	Veres Rivne	37	(8)
1995–1997	CSKA Kyiv	35	(4)
1997	Zenit Saint Petersburg	19	(1)
1997	→ Zenit-d Saint Petersburg	1	(0)
1997–1998	Metalurh Donetsk	14	(0)
1998	→ Metalurh-2 Donetsk	1	(0)
1999	Arsenal Tula	23	(1)
2000–2002	Chernomorets Novorossiysk	62	(1)
2002	Rubin Kazan	10	(1)
2003	Volgar-Gazprom Astrakhan	4	(0)
2003	Arsenal Tula	8	(0)
2004	Gazovik-Gazprom Izhevsk	26	(0)
2004–2005	Vorskla Poltava	11	(1)
2005–2006	Borysfen Boryspil	6	(0)

International career
1993–1994	Ukraine U21	9	(3)
2001	Ukraine	1	(0)
- * Club domestic league appearances and goals

Oleksandr Viktorovych Svystunov (Ukrainian: Олександр Вікторович Свистунов; born 30 August 1973) is a Ukrainian former professional footballer who played as a midfielder.

== Club career ==
Svystunov made his professional debut in the Soviet First League in 1990 for SC Tavriya Simferopol. He played two games in the 2001–02 UEFA Cup for Chernomorets Novorossiysk.
