= Mykola Volosyanko =

Ukrainian footballer (1972–2012)

Personal information
- Full name: Mykola Mykolayovych Volosyanko
- Date of birth: 13 March 1972
- Place of birth: Staryi Lysets, Ivano-Frankivsk Oblast, Ukrainian SSR
- Date of death: 6 June 2012 (aged 40)
- Place of death: Kyiv, Ukraine
- Height: 1.82 m (6 ft 0 in)
- Position: Defender

Senior career*
Years	Team	Apps	(Gls)
1989	Prykarpattya Ivano-Frankivsk	10	(0)
1990	Dynamo Kyiv	0	(0)
1990–1992	SKA Kyiv	63	(2)
1992–1993	Prykarpattya Ivano-Frankivsk	54	(1)
1993–1996	CSKA-Borysfen Kyiv	105	(17)
1996–1998	Dynamo Kyiv	10	(1)
1996–1998	→ Dynamo-2 Kyiv	56	(0)
1997–1998	→ Dynamo-3 Kyiv	4	(1)
1998–2000	Metalurh Mariupol	58	(4)
2000–2002	CSKA Kyiv / Arsenal Kyiv	50	(1)
2000–2001	→ CSKA-2 Kyiv	3	(0)
2002	Chernomorets Novorossiysk	13	(1)
2003	Borysfen Boryspil	4	(0)
2003	→ Borysfen-2 Boryspil	8	(1)
2003	Volyn Lutsk	4	(0)
2003	→ Ikva Mlyniv (loan)	1	(0)
2004	Borysfen Boryspil	11	(0)
2004	→ Boreks-Borysfen Borodianka	2	(0)

International career
1996	Ukraine	1	(0)

Managerial career
- 2007–2008: Knyazha Shchaslyve (assistant)
- 2008: Prykarpattya Ivano-Frankivsk (assistant)
- 2009–2011: Arsenal Kyiv U19 (assistant)
- * Club domestic league appearances and goals

Mykola Volosyanko (Ukrainian: Микола Миколайович Волосянко; 13 March 1972 – 6 June 2012) was a Ukrainian professional football player and assistant manager.

Volosyanko was born in Ivano-Frankivsk Oblast. He made his professional debut in the Soviet Second League in 1989 for FC Prykarpattya Ivano-Frankivsk.

Volosyanko died on 6 June 2012 from apparent heart failure.

== Honours ==
Dynamo Kyiv

- Ukrainian Premier League: 1997, 1998
- Ukrainian Cup: 1998
