= Oleg Solovyov =

Ukrainian footballer (born 1973)

Personal information
- Full name: Oleg Nikolayevich Solovyov
- Date of birth: 13 August 1973 (age 53)
- Place of birth: Samarkand, Uzbek SSR
- Height: 1.85 m (6 ft 1 in)
- Position: Midfielder

Youth career
- DYuSSh Samarkand

Senior career*
Years	Team	Apps	(Gls)
1990	FC Sherdor Samarkand	11	(3)
1990–1992	FC Salyut Belgorod	43	(2)
1992	FC Metalist Kharkiv	12	(0)
1992	FC Olimpik Kharkiv	2	(0)
1993	FC Nyva-Borysfen Myronivka	13	(4)
1993	FC Boryspil	21	(6)
1994	FC Lada Togliatti	10	(1)
1995–1996	FC Energiya-Tekstilshchik Kamyshin	55	(4)
1997	FC Chernomorets Novorossiysk	29	(3)
1998–2000	FC Saturn Ramenskoye	72	(10)
2001–2002	FC Uralan Elista	37	(2)
2004	FC Vidnoye	14	(0)
2004–2005	FC Salyut-Energiya Belgorod	36	(7)
2006	FC Spartak Shchyolkovo	20	(0)
2006–2009	FC Fortuna Mytishchi		

International career
1992–1993	Ukraine U21	3	(0)
- * Club domestic league appearances and goals

Oleg Nikolayevich Solovyov (Russian: Олег Николаевич Соловьёв; Ukrainian: Олег Миколайович Соловйов – Oleh Mykolayovych Solovyov; born 13 August 1973) is a retired Ukrainian professional footballer. He also holds Russian citizenship.

== Club career ==
He made his professional debut in the Soviet Second League in 1990 for FC Sherdor Samarkand.

In 1993 he was one of the first players of the new football project of Dmytro Zlobenko that later became known as CSKA-Borysfen and Arsenal Kyiv.
