= Andriy Kirlik =

Ukrainian footballer

Personal information
- Full name: Andriy Yanoshevych Kirlik
- Date of birth: November 21, 1974 (age 51)
- Place of birth: Khmelnytskyi, Soviet Union
- Height: 1.80 m (5 ft 11 in)
- Position: Midfielder

Youth career
- FC Podillya Khmelnytskyi

Senior career*
Years	Team	Apps	(Gls)
1991–1993	FC Podillya Khmelnytskyi	23	(1)
1993	FC Tsementnyk Kamianets-Podilskyi	5	(0)
1993–1994	FC Metalist Kharkiv	7	(0)
1994	FC Boryspil	2	(0)
1994	Tavria Kherson	3	(0)
1994–1997	FC Kremin Kremenchuk	82	(2)
1997–1998	FC Nyva Ternopil	29	(2)
1998–2000	FC Metalist Kharkiv	51	(10)
1998–1999	→ FC Metalist-2 Kharkiv	5	(0)
2000–2002	CSKA / Arsenal Kyiv	47	(5)
2001–2002	→ FC CSKA-2 Kyiv	3	(1)
2002	→ FC Borysfen Boryspil (loan)	3	(0)
2003–2008	Chornomorets	115	(14)
- * Club domestic league appearances and goals

Andriy Yanoshevych Kirlik (Ukrainian: Андрій Яношевич Кірлік, born 21 November 1974) is a retired Ukrainian footballer who played as a midfielder. He last played for Chornomorets in the Ukrainian Premier League, from 2003 to 2008.

He was ordained as deacon by Metropolitan Agafangel (Savvin) of Odesa and Izmail in jurisdiction of the Ukrainian Orthodox Church (Moscow Patriarchate) on 7 March 2009.
