= Vitaliy Pushkutsa =

Ukrainian football coach (born 1974)

Personal information
- Full name: Vitaliy Heorhiyovych Pushkutsa
- Date of birth: 13 July 1974 (age 52)
- Place of birth: Reni, Ukrainian SSR
- Height: 1.74 m (5 ft 8 1/2 in)
- Positions: Forward; midfielder

Youth career
- KhGVUFK-1 Kharkiv

Senior career*
Years	Team	Apps	(Gls)
1991–1992	FC Olympik Kharkiv	51	(13)
1992–1994	FC Metalist Kharkiv	54	(11)
1994	FC Boryspil	6	(4)
1994–1996	CSKA-Borysfen Kyiv	67	(14)
1996–1997	FC Dynamo-2 Kyiv	3	(0)
1997–1999	FC Metalurh Mariupol	60	(8)
2000–2001	FC Chernomorets Novorossiysk	16	(1)
2002–2004	FC Metalist Kharkiv	42	(23)
2002–2004	→ FC Metalist-2 Kharkiv (loans)	4	(0)
2004–2005	FC Vorskla Poltava	2	(0)
2005–2006	FC Arsenal Kharkiv	8	(0)

International career
1992–1995	Ukraine U21	16	(6)

Managerial career
- 2005: FC Arsenal Kharkiv (assistant)
- 2008–2009: FC Arsenal Kharkiv (assistant)
- 2009: FSC Bukovyna Chernivtsi (assistant)
- * Club domestic league appearances and goals

Vitaliy Heorhiyovych Pushkutsa (Ukrainian: Віталій Георгійович Пушкуца; born 13 July 1974 in Reni) is a Ukrainian football coach and a former player. His father is Moldovan.
