= Anatoliy Kroshchenko =

Soviet football player and coach (born 1937)

Personal information
- Full name: Anatoliy Mykolayovych Kroshchenko
- Date of birth: 26 October 1937 (age 89)
- Place of birth: Kyiv, Ukrainian SSR
- Position: Forward

Youth career
- ????–1956: Kiev FShM

Senior career*
Years	Team	Apps	(Gls)
1958	SKVO Kiev	30	(5)
1959	Lokomotyv Vinnytsia	28	(8)
1960	Shakhtar Donetsk	27	(6)
1961–1962	Avanhard Kharkiv	22	(3)
1963–1968	Karpaty Lviv	169	(57)
1966	→ Dnipro Dnipropetrovsk (loan)	10	(1)

Managerial career
- 1971: Shakhtar Kadiyivka (administrator)
- 1979: Okean Kerch
- 1980: Metalurh Dniprodzerzhynsk
- 1981: Spartak Zhytomyr
- 1990: FC Dynamo Kyiv academy (staff)
- 1992–1994: FC Dynamo-3 Kyiv
- 1995: FC Dynamo-2 Kyiv
- 1999–2002: Ukraine U-19
- 2002: Ukraine U-21
- 2003–2011: FC Dynamo Kyiv academy
- * Club domestic league appearances and goals

Anatoliy Mykolayovych Kroshchenko (Ukrainian: Анатолій Миколайович Крощенко; born 26 October 1937) is a Soviet football player and coach from Ukraine.

== Career ==
=== As a player ===
Kroshchenko is a product of the Dynamo Kyiv football academy that he finished in 1957 along with Andriy Biba and Oleh Bazylevych. In 1957, he was listed on the roster for FC Dynamo Kyiv but never played a single game for the season. Next season Kroshchenko played for another team out of Kiev, SC Kiev Military District. Later he played for such teams like Lokomotyv Vinnytsia, Shakhtar Stalino, and Avanhard Kharkiv.

In 1963, Kroshchenko joined the newly established FC Karpaty Lviv where he spent most of his sports career. For Karpaty he set several club records such as becoming the player who scored the first goal in domestic competitions and the first goal in international games. For the single season in 1966 Kroshchenko was loaned to FC Dnipro Dnipropetrovsk.

=== As a coach ===
After retiring from a playing career, Kroshchenko coached several Soviet teams in Ukraine among which were Shakhtar Kadiyivka, Desna Chernihiv, Metalurh Dniprodzerzhynsk, Okean Kerch, and Polissya Zhytomyr. After fall of the Soviet Union initially Kroshchenko coached FC Dynamo-3 Kyiv and FC Dynamo-2 Kyiv and later the Ukraine national under-19 football team taking it to the FIFA U-20 World Cup. Simultaneously, in 2001 he also was appointed the head coach of Ukraine national under-21 football team. In 2003–11, Kroshchenko was a head coach of the Dynamo Kyiv football academy.

Note: Until 2002, Under-19 football team was known as Under-18. In 2001 Ukraine U-18 qualified for the 2001 FIFA U-20 World Cup.

== See also ==
- 2001 FIFA World Youth Championship squads
