= Andriy Annenkov =

Ukrainian football international player

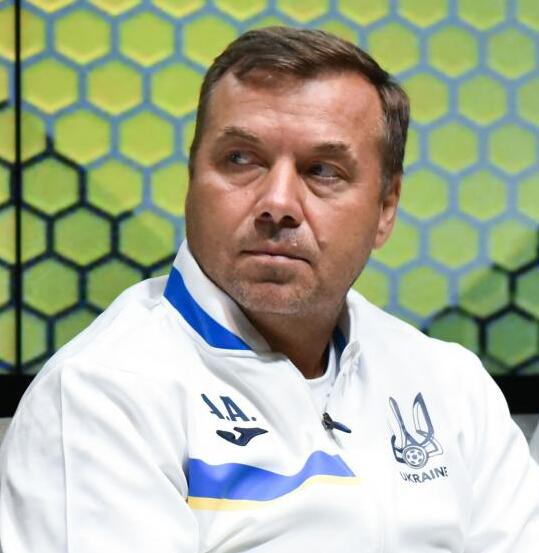

Personal information
- Full name: Andriy Mykhaylovych Annenkov
- Date of birth: 21 January 1969 (age 57)
- Place of birth: Vinnytsia, Ukrainian SSR
- Height: 1.82 m (5 ft 11 1/2 in)
- Positions: Defender; midfielder

Youth career
- DYuSSh–4 Kursk

Senior career*
Years	Team	Apps	(Gls)
1986	Avangard Kursk	17	(0)
1988–1989	Iskra Smolensk	55	(0)
1990–1994	Dynamo Kyiv	54	(3)
1994	→ Dynamo-2 Kyiv	1	(0)
1995–1996	CSKA-Borysfen	28	(0)
1996	Dnipro Dnipropetrovsk	6	(0)
1997	Uralan Elista	41	(0)
1998	Kryvbas Kryvyi Rih	18	(0)
1998	→ Kryvbas-2 Kryvyi Rih	1	(0)
1999	Sokol Saratov	18	(0)
1999–2002	CSKA / Arsenal Kyiv	68	(2)
1999–2001	→ CSKA-2 Kyiv	9	(0)
2002	Irtysh Pavlodar	15	(1)
2003–2004	Borysfen Boryspil	31	(2)
2003	→ Borysfen-2 Boryspil	7	(0)
2004	→ Boreks-Borysfen Borodianka	2	(0)
Total		368	(8)

International career
1992	Ukraine	1	(0)

Managerial career
- 2007–2008: Knyazha Shchaslyve (assistant)
- 2008: Prykarpattia Ivano-Frankivsk (assistant)
- 2009–2013: Arsenal Kyiv Youth (assistant)
- 2014–2015: Arsenal Kyiv
- 2017–2021: Dynamo Kyiv U-19 (assistant)
- 2020: Ukraine U20 (assistant)
- 2021: Chornomorets Odesa (assistant)
- 2021–2023: Ukraine (assistant)
- * Club domestic league appearances and goals

Andriy Mykhaylovych Annenkov (Ukrainian: Aндрiй Михайлович Aннєнков; Russian: Aндрeй Михайлович Aннeнков; born 21 January 1969) is a Ukrainian retired professional football international player and current manager. In 2019 he was a member of the Petrakov's coaching staff for the Ukraine U-20 that became the world champions, for which Ruzhentsev was honored with title "Honored state functionary of physical culture and sport of Ukraine".

== Club career ==
A native of Vinnytsia, Central Ukraine, Annenkov started his football career in one of the sports schools in Kursk, Russian Federation. In 1986 he started his professional career debuting for Russian Avangard Kursk in the Soviet third tier (Vtoraya Liga, Zona 5). Next year Annenkov moved to Smolensk where he served his military service by playing for local Army amateur squad of SKA MVO in competitions among KFK (collectives of physical culture). In 1988–1989 he played for the local Army professional squad FC Iskra Smolensk in the Soviet third tier. In 1990 Annenkov was invited to FC Dynamo Kyiv playing in the Soviet Top League as well as their reserves in competitions for reserves. The same year Annenkov debuted for the clubs' continental competitions.

With fall of the Soviet Union, Annenkov remained with Dynamo joining the Ukrainian Vyshcha Liha (top tier) and stayed with the club until mid season of 1994–1995 when he joined the recently created club from Boryspil that merged with Army team as CSKA-Borysfen Kyiv in the second tier. CSKA-Borysfen earned promotion in 1994–95 and Annenkov played for the club at top tier until in 1996 he got transferred to FC Dnipro. There was an attempt by Ihor Bakay to merge CSKA-Borysfen with Dnipro, but it failed. After short stay at Dnipro, in 1997 Annenkov returned to Russia playing for Kalmykia national team FC Uralan Elista at the Russian second tier. In 1998 he returned back to Ukraine playing for FC Kryvbas Kryvyi Rih at the top level as well as their reserves at the third tier.

In 1999 Annenkov again joined the Russian second tier FC Sokol Saratov, but later same year he returned to Kyiv playing for former CSKA-Borysfen that dropped its hyphenated part and stayed with it until its transformation into FC Arsenal Kyiv in 2001. He also played few games for CSKA reserves at the second tier. Annenkov also managed to cap for CSKA Kyiv at the continental competitions. In 2002 he again went abroad playing for Kazakh Irtysh Pavlodar, but after half a season Annenkov returned to Ukraine joining the Boryspil club FC Borysfen Boryspil that was revived in 1997. Annenkov stayed in Boryspil club until his retirement in 2005. While playing for Boryspil team Annenkov also capped for their organic reserve team as well as FC Systema-Borex Borodianka that for a season was the Boryspil's club farm team.

== International career ==
Annenkov had capped only one game for the Ukraine losing a home friendly to Hungary on 26 August 1992 (1:2).

== Coaching career ==
His coaching career Annenkov started in 2007–2008 as an assistant for the third tier sides Knyazha (suburbs of Kyiv) and the revived Prykarpattia. In 2009 he joined the coaching staff of the Arsenal Kyiv sports school.

He was appointed as manager of the resurrected Arsenal Kyiv in February 2014 but resigned after an unsuccessful start to a new season on 8 August 2015.

In 2017 Annenkov was invited to coach the Dynamo-19 junior side where he served until 2021. During that period as an assistant coach of Oleksandr Petrakov helped the Ukraine junior team become world champions in 2019.

In 2021 as an assistant to Yuriy Moroz, he joined the coaching staff of FC Chornomorets Odesa, but by the end of the calendar year he resigned along with Moroz.

Since August 2021 he is an assistant of Oleksandr Petrakov for the Ukraine national football team.

== Honours ==
Dynamo Kyiv

- Soviet Top League champion: 1990
- Ukrainian Premier League: 1993, 1994
- Ukrainian Cup 1993
