= Hennadiy Moroz =

Ukrainian footballer

Personal information
- Full name: Hennadiy Hryhoriyovych Moroz
- Date of birth: 27 March 1975 (age 51)
- Place of birth: Dnipropetrovsk, Ukrainian SSR, Soviet Union
- Height: 1.77 m (5 ft 10 in)
- Position: Defender

Senior career*
Years	Team	Apps	(Gls)
1991	Dnipro Dnipropetrovsk	0	(0)
1992	Kryvbas Kryvyi Rih	25	(8)
1992–1993	Dnipro Dnipropetrovsk	38	(9)
1994	Boryspil	15	(5)
1994–1995	CSKA-Borysfen Kyiv	20	(0)
1995–1996	Admira/Wacker	29	(0)
1996–1997	Dnipro Dnipropetrovsk	39	(12)
1998–2000	Kryvbas Kryvyi Rih	64	(17)
2000–2001	Dynamo Kyiv	10	(3)
2000–2001	→ Dynamo-2 Kyiv	25	(6)
2002–2003	Dnipro Dnipropetrovsk	40	(3)
2002	→ Dnipro-3 Dnipropetrovsk	1	(0)
2005	Obolon Kyiv	9	(1)

International career
1999–2002	Ukraine	6	(0)
- * Club domestic league appearances and goals

Hennadiy Moroz (Russian: Геннадий Григорьевич Мороз; born 27 March 1975) is a retired Ukrainian football defender.
