= Yervand Sukiasyan =

Armenian footballer (born 1967)

Personal information
- Full name: Yervand Garsevanovich Sukiasyan
- Date of birth: 20 January 1967 (age 59)
- Place of birth: Yerevan, Soviet Armenia
- Height: 1.80 m (5 ft 11 in)
- Position: Defender

Senior career*
Years	Team	Apps	(Gls)
1985–1986	Olympia Ashtarak	58	(4)
1987	Olympia Leninakan	27	(5)
1988	Kotayk Abovian	6	(0)
1988–1991	Ararat Yerevan	83	(6)
1992–1993	Dynamo Kyiv	8	(2)
1993–1994	Boryspil	14	(8)
1994–1995	CSKA-Borysfen Kyiv	33	(7)
1995–1996	Tirol Innsbruck	16	(0)
1996–1997	Kavala	26	(0)
1997–1998	Iraklis	12	(0)
1998–2000	BV Cloppenburg	+5	(?)
2000–2001	Araks Yerevan		
2001–2002	Kerkyra		

International career
1994–2001	Armenia	35	(0)
- * Club domestic league appearances and goals

Yervand Garsevanovich Sukiasyan (Armenian: Երվանդ Սուքիասյան, born on 20 January 1967) is an Armenian former professional footballer who played as a defender. He earned 35 caps for the Armenia national team between 1994 and 2001. Sukiasyan finished his playing career with Kerkyra in the Greek Gamma Ethniki.
