= Volodymyr Savchenko (footballer) =

Ukrainian footballer

Personal information
- Full name: Volodymyr Mykolayovych Savchenko
- Date of birth: 9 September 1973 (age 53)
- Place of birth: Donetsk, Ukrainian SSR
- Height: 1.89 m (6 ft 2 in)
- Position: Goalkeeper

Senior career*
Years	Team	Apps	(Gls)
1991–1992	Olympik Kharkiv	54	(0)
1992	Metalist Kharkiv	0	(0)
1993	Olympik Kharkiv	12	(0)
1993–1994	Metalist Kharkiv	15	(0)
1994–1996	CSKA-Borysfen Boryspil	13	(0)
1996	Anyang LG Cheetahs	7	(0)
1997–2003	Rostov	105	(0)
1999–2000	→ Rostselmash-2	8	(0)
2004–2005	Terek Grozny	41	(0)
2006	Lada Tolyatti	11	(0)
Total		258	(0)

International career
1994	Ukraine U21	1	(0)
1994	Ukraine	2	(0)

Managerial career
- 2018–2019: Olimpik Donetsk (GK coach)
- 2020: Rostov (analyst)
- 2021–2022: Rostov (U-19 GK coach)
- 2022–2023: Alania Vladikavkaz (GK coach)
- 2023–2026: Akron Tolyatti (GK coach)
- * Club domestic league appearances and goals

Volodymyr Mykolayovych Savchenko (Ukrainian: Володимир Миколайович Савченко; Russian: Владимир Николаевич Савченко; born 9 September 1973) is a Ukrainian football coach and a former player who played as goalkeeper. He played for FC Seoul of the South Korean K League, then known as Anyang LG Cheetahs.

== Honours ==
- Russian Cup winner: 2004.
- Russian Cup finalist: 2003.
- Russian First Division best goalkeeper: 2004.

== European club competitions ==
- 1999 UEFA Intertoto Cup with FC Rostselmash Rostov-on-Don: 1 game.
- 2000 UEFA Intertoto Cup with FC Rostselmash Rostov-on-Don: 1 game.
- 2004–05 UEFA Cup qualification rounds with FC Terek Grozny: 4 games.
