= Vadim Egoshkin =

Association football player

Personal information
- Date of birth: 4 January 1970 (age 56)
- Place of birth: Kamchatka Oblast, Russian SFSR
- Height: 1.94 m (6 ft 4 1/2 in)
- Position: Goalkeeper

Senior career*
Years	Team	Apps	(Gls)
1986–1988	FC SKIF Alma-Ata	32	(0)
1988–1990	FC Kairat	3	(0)
1990	FC Zhetysu	18	(0)
1991	FC Kairat	27	(0)
1992	FC Zhiger Shymkent	18	(0)
1992	FC Zhetysu	9	(0)
1993	FC Dostyk	5	(0)
1993–1994	FC Boryspil	29	(0)
1994–1995	CSKA-Borysfen Kyiv	9	(0)
1995	FC Yelimay Semipalatinsk	5	(0)
1996	FC Chernomorets Novorossiysk	11	(0)
1997	FC Kairat	18	(0)
1998	FC CSKA Kairat	6	(0)
2002	FC Esil Bogatyr	4	(0)

International career
1992–1996	Kazakhstan	3	(0)

Managerial career
- 2004–2005: FC Alma-Ata (GK coach)
- 2006: FC Alma-Ata (assistant)
- 2007: FC Kairat (assistant)
- 2008: FC Atyrau (assistant)
- 2009: FC Kairat (GK coach)
- * Club domestic league appearances and goals

Vadim Egoshkin (Russian: Вадим Павлович Егошкин; born 4 January 1970) is a Kazakhstani football coach and a former player.

== Honours ==
Dostyk

- Kazakhstan Cup winner: 1993

Yelimay Semipalatinsk

- Kazakhstan Premier League champion: 1995
- Kazakhstan Cup winner: 1995

Kairat

- Kazakhstan Premier League bronze: 1997
