= Vyacheslav Hroznyi =

Ukrainian football player and manager (born 1956)

Vyacheslav Hrozny
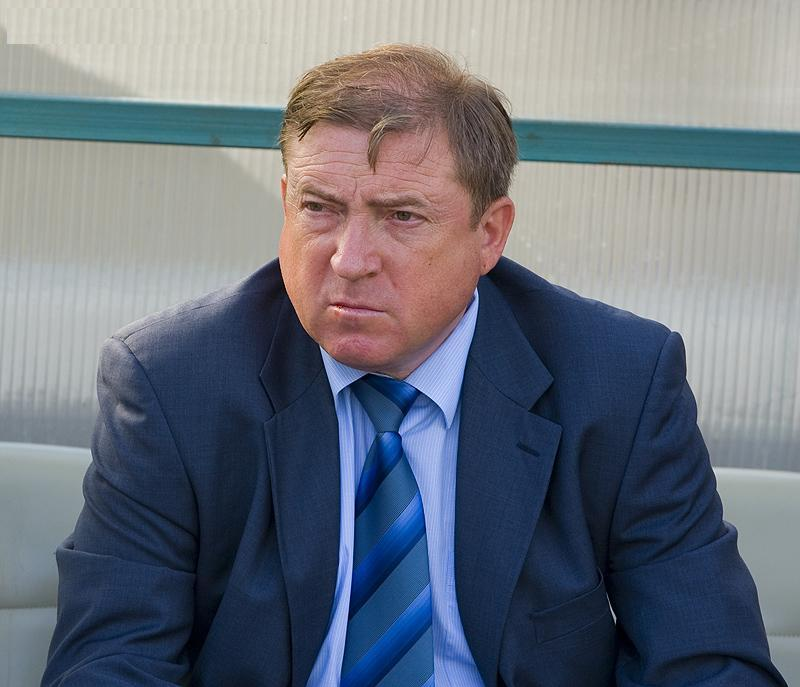
- Hrozny in 2008

Personal information
- Full name: Vyacheslav Viktorovych Hrozny
- Date of birth: 12 July 1956 (age 70)
- Place of birth: Olenivka, Kamianets-Podilskyi Raion, Ukrainian SSR, Soviet Union
- Position: Midfielder

Managerial career
- Years: Team
- 1987: Torpedo Zaporizhia (assistant)
- 1988: Metalurh Zaporizhia (assistant)
- 1989–1992: Nyva Vinnytsia
- 1994–1996: Spartak Moscow (assistant)
- 1996–1997: Dnipro Dnipropetrovsk
- 1998: Levski Sofia
- 1999–2002: Spartak Moscow (assistant)
- 2002–2004: Arsenal Kyiv
- 2005–2006: Metalurh Zaporizhia
- 2008–2009: Terek Grozny
- 2010: Arsenal Kyiv
- 2011–2012: Tobol
- 2013–2016: Hoverla Uzhhorod
- 2016–2017: Dinamo Tbilisi
- 2017: Irtysh Pavlodar
- 2018: Arsenal Kyiv
- 2019–2020: Shakhter Karagandy

Vyacheslav Viktorovych Hrozny (Ukrainian: В'ячеслав Вікторович Грозний; born 12 July 1956) is a Ukrainian football player and manager.

== Career ==
He is a holder of the 1980 KFK Cup of the Ukrainian SSR as a player of FC Nyva Ternopil when it used to play in Pidhaitsi.

Hrozny is a graduate of the Lutsk Pedagogical Institute and the Higher School of Coaches in Moscow. Since the late 1980s coached number of clubs in post-Soviet countries. Until his appointment with Dnipro Dnipropetrovsk in the mid-1990s, Hrozny coached as an assistant to a head coach. In 1997, he was suspended from coaching in Ukraine and moved abroad. Hrozny returned in 2002 after being appointed as a coach of the newly formed club Arsenal Kyiv. But he did not stay in Ukraine for too long and in 2008 Hrozny left again to coach Terek Grozny and FC Tobol.

On 30 December 2019, Hroznyi was announced as the new manager of Shakhter Karagandy. On 17 June 2020, Hroznyi's contract was terminated by mutual consent.

== Managerial statistics ==
As of 26 October 2016

| Nat | Team | From | To | Record | | | | | | | |
| Nat | Team | From | To | G | W | D | L | Win % | GF | GA | +/- |
|---|---|---|---|---|---|---|---|---|---|---|---|
| Ukraine | Dnipro Dnipropetrovsk | 1996 | 1997 | 30 | 14 | 13 | 3 | 46.67% | 48 | 19 | +29 |
| Bulgaria | Levski Sofia | 1998 | 1998 | 15 | 9 | 4 | 2 | 60% | 31 | 9 | +22 |
| Ukraine | Arsenal Kyiv | 2002 | 2004 | 60 | 26 | 15 | 19 | 43.33% | 87 | 68 | +19 |
| Ukraine | Metalurh Zaporizhia | 2005 | 2006 | 30 | 11 | 6 | 13 | 36.67% | 32 | 40 | -8 |
| Russia | Terek Grozny | 2008 | 2009 | 45 | 14 | 14 | 17 | 31.11% | 50 | 64 | -14 |
| Ukraine | Arsenal Kyiv | 2010 | 2010 | 9 | 2 | 4 | 3 | 22.22% | 11 | 16 | -5 |
| Kazakhstan | Tobol | 2012 | 2012 | 26 | 13 | 6 | 7 | 50% | 42 | 27 | +15 |
| Ukraine | Hoverla Uzhhorod | 2013 | 2016 | 80 | 14 | 22 | 44 | 17.5% | 66 | 128 | -62 |
| Georgia | Dinamo Tbilisi | 2016 | Present | 0 | 0 | 0 | 0 | 0% | 0 | 0 | 0 |
| Total Career | | | | 295 | 103 | 84 | 108 | 34.92% | 367 | 371 | -4 |

== Achievements ==
- Merited Coach of Ukraine
- Merited Coach of Russia
- Runner-up of the Bulgarian League (Levski Sofia)
- Finalist of the Ukrainian Cup (Dnipro Dnipropetrovsk)
- Order of Merit (Ukraine) (2004)
