= Central Sports Club of the Armed Forces of Ukraine =

Ukrainian sports club

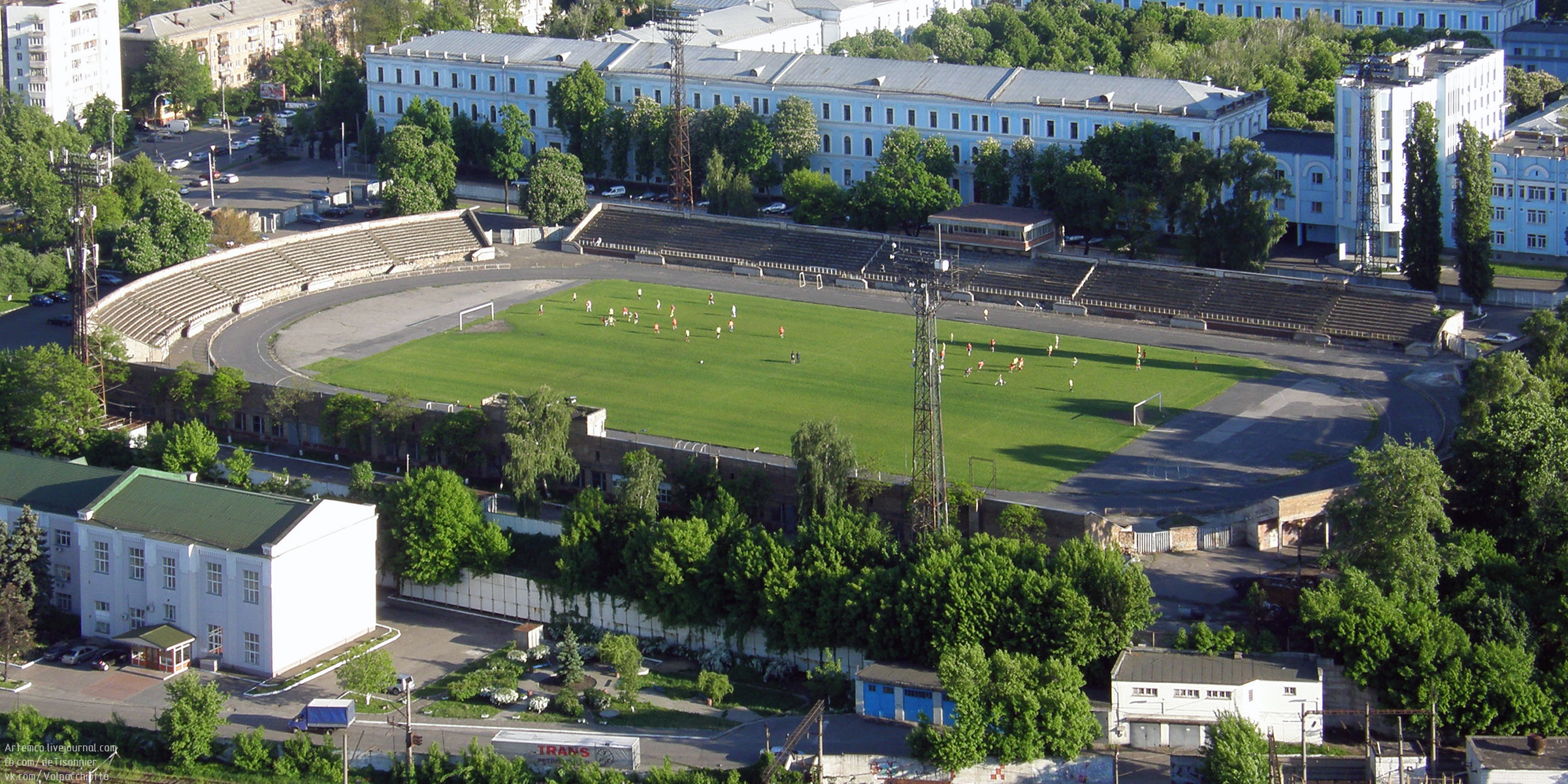
Main stadium of the club (CSK ZSU Stadium)

Central Sports Club of the Armed Forces of Ukraine (Ukrainian: Центральний Спортивний Клуб Збройних Сил України, transliteration: Tsentralnyi Sportyvnyi Klub Zbroinykh Syl Ukrayiny) or CSK ZSU (Ukrainian: ЦСК ЗСУ) is a sports club that was created on December 15, 1992 based on the Soviet Sports Club of Army (SKA Kyiv) in Kyiv (sports organization of the Soviet Kiev Military District and the Soviet Armed Forces sports society), which dissolved after the fall of the Soviet Union.

CSK ZSU is subordinated to the Ministry of Defense sports department (created on April 29, 1992).

The club is a member of the National Olympic Committee of Ukraine and prepares Ukrainian Olympic reserve (Olympians) for Olympic Games. The club is an important contributor to the Ministry of Defence sports department in the International Military Sports Council competitions.

The club also used to administer several professional teams, particularly in football, such as FC CSKA Kyiv, and cooperated with CSKA-Borysfen (since 2001 known as FC Arsenal Kyiv).

== Brief overview ==
=== Sports Club of the Army (Soviet Union) ===
The predecessor of CSK ZSU was the Sports Club of the Kyiv Military District (SK KVO), which was established on April 1, 1957, by the district's combat training department. The newly formed SK KVO became a reformed regional department of the Sports Society of Armed Forces of the USSR for the Kiev Military District. The club was based on the Sports Club of the Kyiv Military District Officers' Club (SKDO Kyiv). The newly established club included following sports establishments:

- Palace of sports (vulytsia Leitynantska, #1/3)
- Stadium (Povitroflotske shose, #32)
- Covered swimming pool (Povitroflotske shose, #32)
- Equestrian sports facilities (vulytsia Leitynantska, #1/3)
- Shooting sports facilities (shooting range at Koncha-Zaspa)

The Palace of sports, stadium and the shooting range were all inherited from the Officers' Club. The swimming pool, initially uncovered, was part of the Officers' Club since 1951. However after its reconstruction in 1956, it was handed to the administration of military training and was transferred to the sports club only on April 1, 1958, a year later. The equestrian sports facilities were created on the base of a liquidated stables of the 114th Separate Rifle Company and were transferred to the sports club as well. In 1957 the football squad of military servicemen from the Soviet Class B (third tier) were added to the club. The football squad was completely sponsored by the Kyiv Military District headquarters. In 1959 the team however was dissolved.

On May 10, 1960, a day after the Victory Day, the club was renamed into the Army Sports Club Kyiv MD (SKA Kyiv). On July 4, 1962 the shooting sports facilities were transferred to the military unit #01626. Since May 20, 1971 the club was transferred to the staff of #48/105-A and on December 15 it adopted the number 14 becoming the 14th ASC. On February 12, 1980 the club created two children and youth sports schools. One school was for fighting sports and team sports, while another was for other Olympic sports.

=== Central Sports Club of the Armed Forces of Ukraine (Ukraine) ===
With the fall of the Soviet Union, all Soviet organizations funded by the central government ceased to exist. In 1992, the Kyiv Military District was dissolved; some of its components were moved to Russia, while others were transferred to the Armed Forces of Ukraine. The former SKA Kyiv was discontinued, and all its assets were transferred into the newly formed Central Sports Club, which absorbed all the Soviet Army centers based in Ukraine such as Odesa, Lviv, and Sevastopol (each corresponds to the administrative center of a Soviet military district).

In 1993, the Ukrainian Ministry of Defence (sports department) joined the International Military Sports Council.

The first competition in which the Central Sports Club of the Armed Forces of Ukraine competed was the 1993 International Military Sports Council competitions. The club competed in fencing, modern pentathlon, and athletics. At the 1993 European Championship of underwater sports, the club earned 36 medals (8 gold, 19 silver, and 9 bronze). In total, for the 1993 season, the club competed in 102 All-Ukrainian competitions and 44 international competitions.

During the 1994 season, CSK ZSU participated in 117 All-Ukrainian competitions and 54 international competitions. Junior sergeant Timour Taimazov became a World Champion and set World and European records at the 1994 World Weightlifting Championships. The Armed Forces of Ukraine associate Oksana Pochynok (Oxana Potchinok, alternative spelling) became the European champion for juniors (trampolining). The club's athletes successfully competed in the 1994 International Military Sports Council (athletics, modern pentathlon, fencing, and boxing).

During the 1995 season, CSK ZSU participated in 71 All-Ukrainian competitions and 34 international competitions. The CSK ZSU athletes, as part of the Ukrainian Armed Forces national team, participated in the 1995 Military World Games and earned 20 of 30 medals (6 gold, 8 silver, and 6 bronze). The underwater athletes successfully competed at the 1995 World Military Championship, earning 4 medals (3+1+0), and at the 1995 European Military Championship, earning 6 medals (0+1+5). Ensign Ihor Martynenko became the European Rowing Champion.

During the 1996 season, CSK ZSU participated in 57 All-Ukrainian competitions and 65 international competitions. At the 1996 Summer Olympics, Lieutenant Timour Taimazov was awarded a goal medal, and four more were awarded a bronze (Lieutenant Oleksandr Bahach, Senior Ensign Olena Pakholchyk, Senior Ensign Olena Sadovnycha, Armed Forces associate Volodymyr Shamenko). The European champions became Senior Ensign Olena Pakholchyk (sailing), Junior Sergeant Volodymyr Tohuzov, Sergeant Oleksiy Tsapliy (both underwater sports). CSK ZSU actively competed in the 1996 International Military Sports Council competitions (fencing, shooting, cycling, modern pentathlon, Greco-Roman wrestling).

== Sports and Tournaments ==
=== Departments of individual sports ===
- Other (Radio sport, Avia-modeling sport)

== Membership ==
- International Military Sports Council
- National Olympic Committee of Ukraine

=== Tournaments ===
- Olympic games delegates to the National Olympic Committee of Ukraine (NOC Ukraine)
- World Cups
- Continental Cups
- World Cup among military service personnel
- Spartakiade of allied armies (Soviet Commonwealth)

== Directors ==
=== SKA Kiev ===
List of directors:

- 1957 – 1959 Lt. Colonel Borys Konovalov (sports club chief (Ukrainian: начальник спортивного клубу)
- 1959 Major Yevhen Kholod (acting sports club chief (Ukrainian: в.о. начальника спортивного клубу)
- 1959 – 1960 Lt. Colonel Kostyantyn Sakhnovskyi (sports club chief (Ukrainian: начальник спортивного клубу)
- 1960 – 1961 Major Yevhen Kholod (sports club chief (Ukrainian: начальник спортивного клубу)
- 1961 – 1964 Major Mykola Manin (sports club chief (Ukrainian: начальник спортивного клубу)
- 1964 – 1975 Lt. Colonel Volodymyr Ot (sports club chief (Ukrainian: начальник спортивного клубу)
- 1975 – 1976 Lt. Colonel Dmytro Nekrasov (sports club chief (Ukrainian: начальник спортивного клубу)
- 1976 – 1978 Lt. Colonel Viktor Pyanykh (sports club chief (Ukrainian: начальник спортивного клубу)
- 1978 – 1980 Lt. Colonel Henadiy Davydov (sports club chief (Ukrainian: начальник спортивного клубу)
- 1980 – 1986 Lt. Colonel Valentyn Zarutskyi (sports club chief (Ukrainian: начальник спортивного клубу)
- 1986 – 1993 Colonel Volodymyr Vitkov (sports club chief (Ukrainian: начальник спортивного клубу)

=== CSK ZSU ===
List of directors:

- 1991 – 1993 Colonel Volodymyr Vitkov (sports club chief [SKA Kiev] (Ukrainian: начальник спортивного клубу)
- 1993 – 1994 Lt. Colonel Ihor Artamonov (CSK ZSU chief (Ukrainian: начальник ЦСК ЗСУ)
- 1994 – 2005 Colonel Valeriy Izmailov (CSK ZSU chief (Ukrainian: начальник ЦСК ЗСУ)
- 2005 – Colonel Vadym Vysochyn (CSK ZSU chief (Ukrainian: начальник ЦСК ЗСУ)

== Olympic laureates ==
=== Club's Olympians ===
==== 1996 Summer Olympics ====
- Lieutenant Timur Taimazov (weightlifting)
- Lieutenant Oleksandr Bahach (Bronze, athletics)
- (combined team) Volodymyr Shamenko (Bronze, gymnastics)
- (combined team) Senior Ensign Olena Pakholchyk (Bronze, sailing)
- Senior Ensign Olena Sadovnycha (Bronze, archery)

==== 2000 Summer Olympics ====
- Lieutenant Olena Sadovnycha (Silver, archery)
- Lieutenant Olena Pakholchyk (Bronze, sailing)
- Ensign Roman Shchurenko (Bronze, athletics)

==== 2004 Summer Olympics ====
- First Sergeant Hanna Kalinina (Silver, yacht)
- (team) Senior Ensign Oleh Lykov and Senior Ensign Leonid Shaposhnikov (Bronze, rowing)
- Senior Ensign Tetyana Semykina (Bronze, rowing)
- Ensign Viktoriya Styopina (Bronze, athletics)
- Senior Ensign Vladyslav Tretiak (Bronze, fencing)

==== 2008 Summer Olympics ====
- (combined team) Halyna Pundyk and Olha Zhovnir (Gold, fencing)
- Praporshchik Iryna Lishchynska (Silver, athletics)
- Praporshchik Viktoriya Tereshchuk (Bronze, pentathlon)

==== 2012 Summer Olympics ====
- (team) Nataliya Dovhodko, Junior Sergeant Anastasiya Kozhenkova, Junior Sergeant Kateryna Tarasenko, Lieutenant Yana Dementieva (Gold, rowing)
- Junior Lieutenant Yuriy Cheban (Gold, canoeing)
- Oleksandr Pyatnytsya (Silver, athletics)
- (combined team) Mariya Ryemyen (Bronze, athletics)

==== 2015 European Games ====
- Oleh Vernyayev (2 Gold, gymnastics)
- (combined team) Senior Sergeant Olha Zhovnir, Alina Komashchuk, Olena Kravatska (Gold, fencing)
- Andriy Khloptsov (Gold and Bronze, swimming)
- Senior Private Andriy Yagodka (Gold, fencing)
- (combined team) Oleh Vernyayev (Silver, gymnastics)
- Private Olena Sayko (Silver, sambo)
- Senior Private Svitlana Yaryomka (Bronze, judo)
- Vasyl Shuptar (Bronze, wrestling)

== Medal tables ==
=== Medals by Summer Games ===
Games	Gold	Silver	Bronze	Total
1996 Atlanta	1	0	4	5
2000 Sydney	0	1	2	3
2004 Athens	0	1	4	5
2008 Beijing	1	1	1	3
2012 London	2	6	9	17
2015 Baku	7	4	5	16
Totals (6 entries)	11	13	25	49

=== Medals by summer sport ===
Updated for 2012 Olympics

Sport	Gold	Silver	Bronze	Total
Rowing	1	0	2	3
Fencing	1	0	1	2
Canoeing	1	0	0	1
Weightlifting	1	0	0	1
Athletics	0	2	4	6
Sailing	0	1	2	3
Archery	0	1	1	2
Gymnastics	0	0	1	1
Modern pentathlon	0	0	1	1
Totals (9 entries)	4	4	12	20

== Notable coaches ==
- Yukhym Aizenshtadt, a coach of Leonid Zhabotinsky
- Mykhailo Matsykh, a coach of Vitaliy Klychko, Volodymyr Klychko
- Volodymyr Zolotaryov, a coach of Vitaliy Klychko, Volodymyr Klychko, Alexander Gurov, Volodymyr Virchis, Valeriy Sydorenko, Volodymyr Sydorenko
- Vasiliy Brovchenko, a coach of Ivan Bohdan
- Viktor Kaharlytskyi, a coach of Maryna Kyiko

== Olympic centers and clubs ==
=== Centers ===
- Sports base for summer sports of the Ministry of Defense, Lviv
  - Army Sports Club Stadium (Lviv)
  - "Vlasta" Hotel (before 1990 - "Rossiya")
- Sports base for winter sports "Tysovets", Skole
- Army Sports Club Stadium (Odesa), government property dispossession to private sector
- Kyiv Sports Complex, Kyiv
  - CSK ZSU Stadium, a central venue of the club

=== Youth sports ===
In 1980, two sports schools were established (DIuSSh): one for combat sports and sports games, and a separate one for Olympic sports.

=== Clubs ===
- Central Sports Club of the Armed Forces of Ukraine, Kyiv
- Sports club Odesa
- Sports club Bila Tserkva
- Sports club Sevastopol
- Group of athletes of the highest qualification

== See also ==
- FC CSKA Kyiv, football club of CSK ZSU
- National Olympic Committee of Ukraine
- Armed Forces (sports society)
- Officers' Club of Armed Forces of Ukraine
