= Administrative resource =

Political ability to influence election outcomes

Administrative resource is the ability of political candidates (and parties) to use their official positions or connections to government institutions to influence the outcome of elections.

The term is widely used in Russia and other former USSR countries, because the practice is widespread, is well known and is openly discussed by public and media. In these countries, the administrative resource is one of the major factors in most elections. Although similar practices of corruption are conducted throughout the world in countries with fragile democracies, the term administrative resource is ascribed almost exclusively to Russia. Moreover, the utilization of administrative resources is generally not considered to be a democratic form of electioneering but in fact as a tool used to undermine democracy.

The administrative resource is only one part that determines the election outcome. Two other major factors are the ideology (candidate's agenda) and the use of political technologies (PR, campaign organisation, etc.).

Among many different ways the administrative resource can be applied are:

- Mobilisation of organisational and financial resources. The authorities can easily pressure businessmen to fund preferred candidates and parties. Before Russian parliamentary elections the money is often used to create "authorities parties", based not on a particular ideology but on affiliation with the government and easy access to money.
- The laws can be selectively applied to assist friendly candidates, by hindering their competition. The authorities can use frequent tax inspections, police searches and arrests to punish businessmen who fund the competing candidates.
- The authorities can use the election laws to their advantage, for example, by creating a pretext for appealing the results later if the unfavourable candidate is winning. Another option is to stop from voting some groups of people who are likely to vote against the preferred candidate.
- Government controlled organisations, such as the army, prisons, hospitals, public schools, etc. can be mobilised for signature collection and other goals. They can also pressure their employees and customers for voting for particular candidates and exercise control over votes by housing the polling stations.
- Redistribution of budget funds. The authorities can bribe the electorate indirectly by repaying pension debts, indexing salaries, etc. The federal government can control governors by measuring donations to their regions.
- Controlling the mass media. The heads of states or regions can easily create news topics for media, getting free publicity and circumventing the limits for TV advertisements imposed on all candidates. This method was used with particular effectiveness in 2004 Russian presidential election.
- Falsifying the election results. Additional ballots can be introduced under the names of those who didn't vote, ballots for "wrong" candidate can be invalidated by damaging them, ballots can be replaced. The authorities can also control the staff of the election committees and prevent control by independent observers.
