= Yevhen Kotelnykov =

Soviet footballer and Ukrainian coach

Personal information
- Date of birth: 21 March 1939
- Place of birth: Kyiv, USSR
- Date of death: 19 December 2017 (aged 78)
- Place of death: Kyiv, Ukraine
- Position: Defender

Youth career
- 1955–1957: Dynamo Kyiv

Senior career*
Years	Team	Apps	(Gls)
1958–1965	Lokomotiv Vinnitsa	192	(1)
1966	FC Torpedo Berdyansk	14	(0)

Managerial career
- 1967–1977: Dynamo Kyiv (youth coach)
- * Club domestic league appearances and goals

Yevhen Kotelnykov (21 March 1939 – 19 December 2017) was a Soviet soccer player and coach from Ukraine.
