= Dmytro Topchiyev =

Ukrainian footballer

Personal information
- Full name: Dmytro Mykolayovych Topchiyev
- Date of birth: 25 September 1966 (age 60)
- Place of birth: Nikopol, Ukraine
- Height: 1.89 m (6 ft 2 1/2 in)
- Positions: Midfielder; defender

Youth career
- -1984: Kolos Nikopol (reserves)

Senior career*
Years	Team	Apps	(Gls)
1984–1987	FC Uralets Nizhny Tagil	26	(2)
1987	FC Geolog Tyumen	1	(0)
1988	FC Torpedo Zaporizhia	11	(2)
1988–1991	Kolos Nikopol	147	(17)
1992	FC Volyn Lutsk	17	(4)
1992	FC Karpaty Lviv	15	(1)
1993–1994	FC Dynamo Kyiv	48	(10)
1994–1995	FC CSKA-Borysfen Boryspil	14	(2)
1995	FC Dnipro Dnipropetrovsk	34	(3)
1996	FC Karpaty Lviv	3	(0)
1997	FC Metalurh Nikopol	14	(3)
1997	FC Zirka Kirovohrad	9	(1)
1997	→ FC Zirka-2 Kirovohrad	1	(0)
1998	FC Uralmash Yekaterinburg	3	(0)
1998	PFC Spartak Nalchik	18	(3)
1999–2000	FC Metalurh Zaporizhzhia	30	(4)
1999	→ FC Metalurh-2 Zaporizhzhia	2	(0)
2000	FC Baltika Kaliningrad	1	(0)
2000–2002	FC Volyn Lutsk	48	(6)
2002	FC Aktobe-Lento	9	(1)
Total		451	(59)

International career
1992–1993	Ukraine	5	(0)
- * Club domestic league appearances and goals

Dmytro Mykolayovych Topchiyev (Ukrainian: Дмитро Миколайович Топчієв; born 25 September 1966) is a retired Ukrainian professional footballer.

He made his professional debut playing at the Ural region in 1984 for FC Uralets Nizhny Tagil and later in 1987 when he debuted in the 1987 Soviet First League for FC Geolog Tyumen.

In 1988 Topchiyev returned to Ukraine, at first in Zaporizhia before joining his hometown club FC Kolos Nikopol.

At the top level Topchiyev debuted already debuted following dissolution of the Soviet Union in 1992 playing in western Ukraine for FC Volyn Lutsk and FC Karpaty Lviv before finally joining FC Dynamo Kyiv in 1993.

== Honours ==
- Ukrainian Premier League champion: 1993.
- Ukrainian Cup winner: 1994.
