= Oleh Bazylevych =

Ukrainian footballer, coach and sport administrator

Personal information
- Full name: Oleh Petrovych Bazylevych
- Date of birth: 6 July 1938
- Place of birth: Kyiv, Ukrainian SSR
- Date of death: 16 October 2018 (aged 80)
- Place of death: Kyiv, Ukraine
- Height: 1.75 m (5 ft 9 in)
- Position: Forward

Senior career*
Years	Team	Apps	(Gls)
1957–1966	Dynamo Kyiv	161	(63)
1966	Chornomorets Odesa	35	(6)
1967–1968	Shakhtar Donetsk	32	(9)
Total		228	(78)

Managerial career
- 1969–1970: Desna Chernihiv
- 1971: Shakhtar Kadiivka
- 1972: Avtomobilist Zhytomyr
- 1972–1973: Shakhtar Donetsk
- 1974–1976: Dynamo Kyiv (assistant)
- 1975–1976: USSR (assistant)
- 1977–1978: Dinamo Minsk
- 1979: Pakhtakor Tashkent
- 1979: USSR
- 1980–1982: CSKA Moscow
- 1984: Zorya Voroshilovhrad
- 1985: Ukrainian SSR junior team
- 1986: Shakhtar Donetsk
- 1987–1988: Slavia Sofia
- 1988–1989: Bulgaria (consultant)
- 1992–1994: Ukraine
- 1995–1996: Kuwait (olympic)
- 1997: Al Kuwait Kaifan
- * Club domestic league appearances and goals

Oleh Petrovych Bazylevych (Ukrainian: Оле́г Петро́вич Базиле́вич; also: Bazilevich, Bazylewicz; 6 July 1938 – 16 October 2018) was a Ukrainian footballer, coach, and sport administrator. He holds titles of the Master of Sports of the USSR, Merited Coach of the Soviet Union, and Merited Coach of Ukraine.

== Career ==
Bazylevych played club football for Dynamo Kyiv, Chornomorets Odesa and Shakhtar Donetsk, winning the Soviet Top League with Dynamo Kyiv in 1961 and the USSR cup in 1964. Bazylevych played for Dynamo Kyiv from 1957 to 1965 in 161 matches and scored 53 goals.

This player was noted for his high speed, technique of ball possession and excellent play in the air. He is remembered for often locking himself in the far post of Valery Lobanovsky. The Bazylevych-Lobanovsky duo scored 11 of the team's 29 goals in the 1966 tournament.

Following his playing career, Bazylevych became a manager. As a co-manager with Valeriy Lobanovskyi Bazylevych won with Dynamo Kyiv the 1974–75 Cup Winners' Cup and the 1975 European Super Cup (and a bronze medal with the Soviet Union Olympic football team at the 1976 Summer Olympics).

In 1977–1978 he was the head coach of Dinamo Minsk, and in 1979 of Pakhtakor Tashkent. He avoided the plane crash that killed most of the Pakhtakor squad on 11 August 1979 by traveling a day ahead of the team to Sochi (to visit his wife and son staying there on vacation), intending to join the team the next day.

Bazylevych was fired from the position of the head coach of the Ukraine main team in 1994 when his team managed to lose at home to Lithuania 0:2 in its first game of official competitions. From 1998 to 2001 lead the FFU Committee that worked with national teams.

== Managerial statistics ==
As of match updated 12 September 2023

Team	From	To	Record				
Team	From	To	G	W	D	L	Win %
Ukraine	27 April 1993	7 September 1994	11	4	3	4	36.36
Total			11	4	3	4	36.36

== Awards ==
- Champion USSR: 1961 (player), 1974, 1975 (coach)
- Silver medals of USSR Championship: 1960, 1965 (player)
- Soviet Cup: 1964 (player), 1974 (coach)
- Cup Winners' Cup: 1975 (coach)
- UEFA Super Cup: 1975 (coach)
- Olympics bronze medal: 1976 (coach)

== Death ==
In January 2017, there were reports of Bazilevich's incurable Parkinson's disease, with which Oleh fought for many years.

On 16 October 2018, Oleh Bazylevych died in Kyiv. He was buried in the Central Avenue of the Baikove Cemetery.
