= Vitaliy Ponomarenko =

Ukrainian powerlifter

Vitaliy Ponomarenko (March 18, 1974 – February 5, 2008) was a Ukrainian powerlifting champion. Ponomarenko weighed 220 lbs. At the time of his death he still holds the second highest bench press with a 782-pound press. He died on 5 February 2008 due to a heart condition.
