= List of Ukraine international footballers =

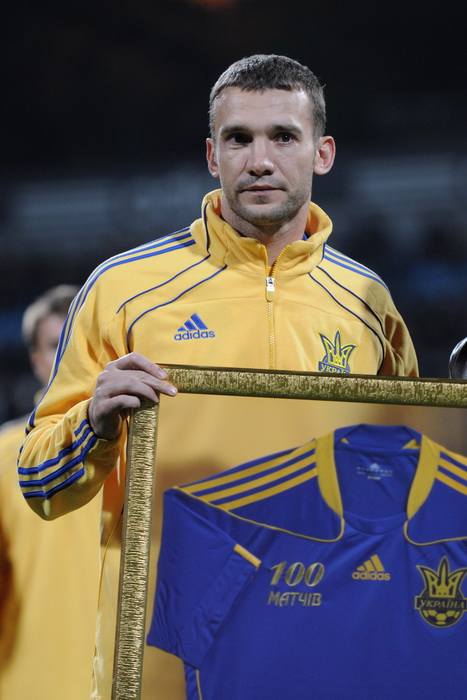
Andriy Shevchenko is the top scorer in the history of Ukraine

This is a list of Ukraine international footballers, who have played for the Ukraine national football team. The list does not include players who have played for Ukraine before the dissolution of the Soviet Union in various tournaments such as the Spartakiad of the Peoples of the USSR as well as friendlies or exhibition games.

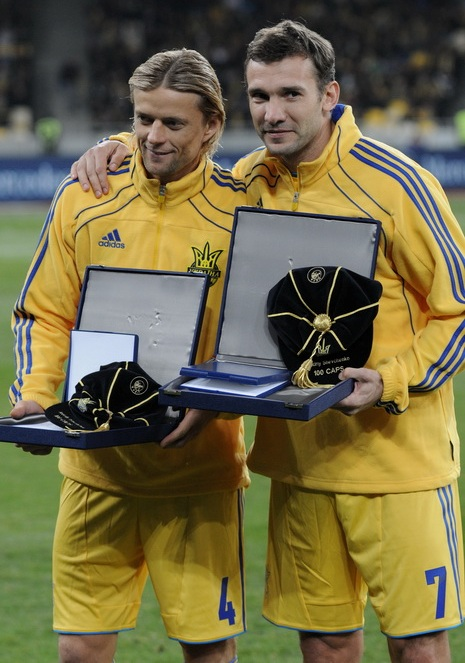
Anatoliy Tymoshchuk (Note: On 11 March 2022, UAF annulled Tymoshchuk's caps and goals for the national team due to his refusal to speak out against the 2022 Russian invasion of Ukraine.) and Andriy Shevchenko being honored by UEFA in 2011 for their 100th cap. They were the first and second, respectively, most capped national team players at the time.

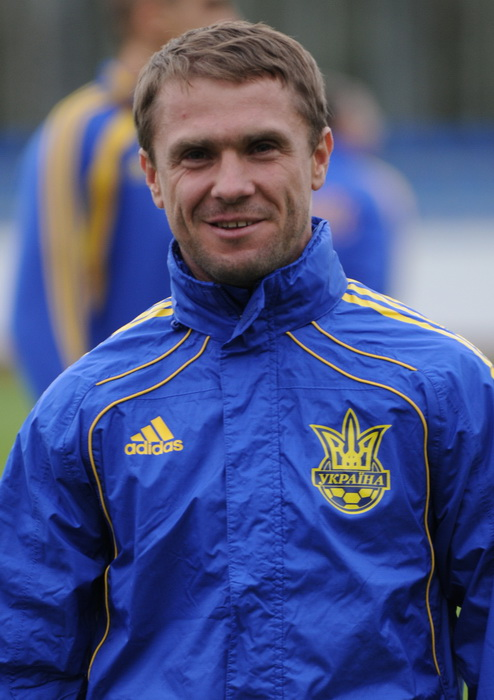
Serhiy Rebrov (capped 75 matches with scoring of 15 goals) – the youngest football player in the history of the national team, who made his debut at the age of 18 years and 24 days.

== List of players ==
As of 2 October 2026 (the last game against Northern Ireland) in the senior national representation, 318 football players have made at least one appearance. (Note: A match against Malta national football team on 6 June 2017, where 10 substitutions were used (Law 03: 2. Number of substitutions: "In national “A” team matches, up to a maximum of six substitutes may be used") is included – the match is not recognised by FIFA, but is listed as an official match by the Ukrainian Association of Football.)

– players born outside of Ukraine

Name	Date of birth (age)	Position	First match	Last match	Caps	Goals	Date of death
Anatoliy Tymoschuk	30 March 1979 (age 47)	MF-DF	2000-04-26	2016-06-21	144	4	
Andriy Yarmolenko	23 October 1989 (age 36)	FW-MF	2009-09-05	2026-10-02	127	47	
Andriy Shevchenko	29 September 1976 (age 50)	FW	1995-03-25	2012-06-19	111	48	
Andriy Pyatov	28 June 1984 (age 42)	GK	2007-08-22	2022-06-11	102	0	
Ruslan Rotan	29 October 1981 (age 44)	MF	2003-02-12	2018-03-27	100	8	
Oleh Husyev	25 April 1983 (age 43)	MF-DF	2003-08-20	2016-03-24	98	13	
Oleksandr Shovkovskyi	2 January 1975 (age 51)	GK	1994-11-13	2012-02-29	92	0	
Yevhen Konoplyanka	29 September 1989 (age 37)	MF-FW	2010-05-25	2023-03-26	87	21	
Taras Stepanenko	8 August 1989 (age 37)	MF	2010-11-17	2024-10-14	87	4	
Mykola Matviyenko	2 May 1996 (age 30)	DF	2017-03-24	2026-10-02	86	0	
Serhiy Rebrov	3 June 1974 (age 52)	FW	1992-06-27	2006-09-06	75	15	
Oleksandr Zinchenko	15 December 1996 (age 29)	MF	2015-10-12	2025-09-09	75	12	
Andriy Voronin	21 July 1979 (age 47)	FW	2002-03-27	2012-06-15	74	8	
Roman Yaremchuk	27 November 1995 (age 30)	FW	2018-09-06	2026-10-02	71	18	
Ruslan Malinovskyi	4 May 1993 (age 33)	MF	2015-03-31	2026-06-07	71	10	
Andriy Husin	11 December 1972	MF-DF	1993-06-26	2006-09-06	71	9	17 September 2014 (aged 41)
Viktor Tsyhankov	15 November 1997 (age 28)	MF-FW	2016-11-12	2026-10-02	70	14	
Andriy Vorobey	29 November 1978 (age 47)	FW	2000-05-31	2008-03-26	68	9	
Andriy Nesmachnyi	28 February 1979 (age 47)	DF	2000-04-26	2009-02-10	67	0	
Vladyslav Vashchuk	2 January 1975 (age 51)	DF	1996-04-09	2007-11-21	63	1	
Serhiy Sydorchuk	2 May 1991 (age 35)	MF	2014-10-09	2024-06-21	62	3	
Illya Zabarnyi	1 September 2002 (age 24)	DF	2020-10-07	2026-10-02	60	3	
Yevhen Seleznyov	20 July 1985 (age 41)	FW	2008-05-24	2018-09-06	58	11	
Oleksandr Holovko	6 January 1972 (age 54)	DF	1995-04-26	2004-02-18	58	0	
Oleksandr Kucher	22 November 1982 (age 43)	DF	2006-08-15	2017-06-06	57	2	
Serhiy Nazarenko	16 February 1980 (age 46)	MF	2003-10-11	2012-11-14	56	12	
Vyacheslav Shevchuk	13 May 1979 (age 47)	DF	2003-04-30	2016-06-16	56	0	
Vitaliy Mykolenko	29 May 1999 (age 27)	DF	2018-11-20	2026-09-25	55	1	
Serhiy Popov	22 April 1971 (age 55)	DF	1993-04-27	2003-09-10	54	5	
Yaroslav Rakytskyi	3 August 1989 (age 37)	DF	2009-10-10	2018-10-16	54	5	
Artem Fedetskyi	26 April 1985 (age 41)	DF	2010-05-25	2016-11-15	53	2	
Mykola Shaparenko	4 October 1998 (age 28)	MF	2018-05-31	2026-09-28	52	2	
Oleh Luzhnyi	5 August 1968 (age 58)	DF	1992-04-29	2003-09-10	52	0	
Yevhen Khacheridi	28 July 1987 (age 39)	DF	2009-10-10	2018-03-23	51	3	
Artem Milevskyi	12 January 1985 (age 41)	FW	2006-06-19	2012-10-12	50	8	
Oleksandr Karavayev	2 June 1992 (age 34)	DF-MF	2015-10-09	2025-11-13	50	3	
Andriy Rusol	16 January 1983 (age 43)	DF	2004-03-31	2010-06-02	49	3	
Maksym Kalynychenko	26 January 1979 (age 47)	MF	2002-05-17	2011-09-06	47	7	
Oleksandr Zubkov	3 August 1996 (age 30)	MF-FW	2020-10-07	2026-10-02	47	3	
Artem Dovbyk	21 June 1997 (age 29)	FW	2021-03-31	2026-06-07	41	11	
Volodymyr Yezerskyi	15 November 1976 (age 49)	DF	1998-07-15	2008-05-24	39	2	
Yuriy Dmytrulin	10 February 1975 (age 51)	DF	1996-08-13	2004-11-17	39	1	
Heorhiy Sudakov	1 September 2002 (age 24)	MF	2021-05-23	2026-10-02	38	4	
Oleh Shelayev	5 November 1976 (age 49)	MF	2004-04-28	2007-11-21	36	1	
Marko Dević	27 October 1983 (age 42)	FW	2008-11-19	2014-05-22	35	7	
Serhiy Kryvtsov	15 March 1991 (age 35)	DF	2011-09-06	2023-09-12	34	0	
Roman Zozulya	17 November 1989 (age 36)	FW	2010-06-02	2016-11-15	33	4	
Bohdan Butko	13 January 1991 (age 35)	DF	2011-09-02	2019-03-25	33	0	
Viktor Kovalenko	14 February 1996 (age 30)	MF	2016-03-24	2021-11-11	33	0	
Taras Mykhalyk	28 October 1983 (age 42)	DF-MF	2006-08-15	2012-11-14	32	0	
Denys Harmash	19 April 1990 (age 36)	MF	2011-10-07	2021-11-11	31	2	
Anatoliy Trubin	1 August 2001 (age 25)	GK	2021-03-31	2026-09-28	30	0	
Hennadiy Zubov	12 September 1977 (age 49)	MF-FW	1996-10-05	2003-09-10	29	3	
Serhiy Fedorov	18 February 1975 (age 51)	DF	1999-11-17	2007-11-21	29	1	
Oleksiy Hai	6 November 1982 (age 43)	MF	2003-10-11	2011-11-11	29	1	
Dmytro Chyhrynskyi	7 November 1986 (age 39)	DF	2007-02-07	2011-10-11	29	0	
Eduard Sobol	20 April 1995 (age 31)	DF	2016-09-05	2023-06-12	29	0	
Oleksandr Aliyev	3 February 1985 (age 41)	MF	2008-09-06	2012-06-15	28	6	
Mykhailo Mudryk	5 January 2001 (age 25)	MF-FW	2022-06-01	2024-11-19	28	3	
Yuriy Maksymov	8 December 1968 (age 57)	MF	1992-10-28	2002-04-17	27	5	
Yukhym Konoplya	26 August 1999 (age 27)	DF	2020-10-07	2026-03-31	27	2	
Marlos Romero Bonfim	7 June 1988 (age 38)	MF	2017-10-06	2021-06-21	27	1	
Oleksandr Tymchyk	20 January 1997 (age 29)	DF	2020-09-03	2026-03-31	26	1	
Vitaliy Kosovskyi	11 August 1973 (age 53)	MF	1996-05-01	2000-09-02	25	2	
Roman Bezus	26 September 1990 (age 36)	MF	2011-11-11	2021-06-29	24	5	
Viktor Skrypnyk	19 November 1969 (age 56)	DF	1994-09-07	2003-02-12	24	2	
Vitaliy Mandzyuk	24 January 1986 (age 40)	DF	2008-02-06	2013-11-19	24	1	
Artem Kravets	3 June 1989 (age 37)	FW	2011-02-08	2019-06-07	23	8	
Dmytro Mykhaylenko	13 July 1973 (age 53)	MF	1993-04-27	2000-10-07	23	2	
Serhiy Bezhenar	9 August 1970 (age 56)	DF	1992-04-29	1997-11-15	23	1	
Serhiy Konovalov	1 April 1972 (age 54)	MF	1993-04-27	2003-02-12	22	3	
Yuriy Kalitvintsev	5 May 1968 (age 58)	MF	1995-03-25	1999-03-31	22	1	
Oleksiy Byelik	15 February 1981 (age 45)	FW	2004-09-08	2007-03-24	19	5	
Artem Byesyedin	31 March 1996 (age 30)	FW	2016-11-15	2021-06-29	19	2	
Vladyslav Vanat	4 January 2002 (age 24)	DF	2023-06-12	2026-09-28	19	2	
Heorhiy Bushchan	31 May 1994 (age 32)	GK	2020-10-07	2024-06-07	18	0	
Dmytro Parfenov	11 September 1974 (age 52)	DF	1996-04-09	2004-03-31	18	0	
Serhiy Skachenko	18 November 1972 (age 53)	FW	1994-05-25	2002-05-17	17	3	
Valeriy Kriventsov	30 July 1973 (age 53)	MF	1994-09-11	1998-10-14	17	0	
Hennadiy Orbu	23 July 1970 (age 56)	MF-FW	1994-11-13	1997-05-07	17	0	
Oleksandr Radchenko	19 July 1976	DF	2002-03-21	2005-10-12	17	0	7 February 2023 (aged 46)
Mykhaylo Starostyak	13 October 1973 (age 53)	DF	1997-03-23	2004-09-08	17	0	
Oleksiy Hutsulyak	25 December 1997 (age 28)	MF	2024-03-21	2026-03-31	16	6	
Oleksandr Melashchenko	13 December 1978 (age 47)	FW	2001-02-14	2003-09-06	16	3	
Andriy Lunin	11 February 1999 (age 27)	GK	2018-03-23	2025-06-10	16	0	
Edmar Halovskyi	16 June 1980 (age 46)	MF	2011-08-10	2014-10-12	15	1	
Yevhen Selin	9 May 1988 (age 38)	DF	2011-10-07	2014-05-22	15	1	
Serhiy Kormiltsev	22 January 1974 (age 52)	MF	2000-04-26	2004-08-18	15	0	
Yevhen Makarenko	21 May 1991 (age 35)	MF	2014-03-05	2021-09-08	15	0	
Bohdan Mykhaylichenko	21 March 1997 (age 29)	DF	2020-09-03	2026-09-28	15	0	
Tymerlan Huseynov	24 January 1968 (age 58)	FW	1993-10-16	1997-03-23	14	8	
Viktor Leonenko	5 October 1969 (age 57)	FW	1992-08-26	1996-08-31	14	6	
Ivan Kalyuzhnyi	21 January 1998 (age 28)	MF	2024-10-11	2026-03-31	14	1	
Mykola Morozyuk	17 January 1988 (age 38)	MF-DF	2010-11-17	2017-06-06	14	1	
Serhiy Shyshchenko	13 January 1976 (age 50)	MF	2001-08-15	2005-10-12	14	1	
Vasyl Kardash	14 January 1973 (age 53)	DF	1996-04-09	2001-03-28	14	0	
Serhiy Nahornyak	5 September 1971 (age 55)	MF-FW	1994-09-07	2002-04-17	14	0	
Oleksandr Pikhalyonok	7 May 1997 (age 29)	MF	2022-06-08	2026-09-28	14	0	
Yevhen Pokhlebayev	25 November 1971 (age 54)	MF	1992-10-28	1996-05-01	14	0	
Vitaliy Buyalskyi	6 January 1993 (age 33)	MF	2017-10-06	2023-09-12	13	0	
Volodymyr Mykytyn	28 April 1970 (age 56)	DF-MF	1998-07-15	1999-10-09	13	0	
Ivan Ordets	8 July 1992 (age 34)	DF	2014-05-22	2018-03-27	12	1	
Serhiy Serebrennikov	1 September 1976 (age 50)	MF	2001-08-15	2006-02-28	12	1	
Denys Oliynyk	16 August 1987 (age 39)	MF-FW	2010-05-25	2015-06-09	12	0	
Oleh Suslov	2 January 1969 (age 57)	GK	1994-11-13	1997-03-29	12	0	
Vyacheslav Sviderskyi	1 January 1979 (age 47)	DF	2005-03-30	2007-02-07	12	0	
Oleksandr Hladkyi	24 August 1987 (age 39)	FW	2007-08-22	2015-09-08	11	1	
Júnior Moraes	4 April 1987 (age 39)	FW	2019-03-22	2021-03-31	11	1	
Oleh Ocheretko	25 May 2003 (age 23)	MF	2025-09-05	2026-10-02	11	1	
Valeriy Bondar	27 February 1999 (age 27)	DF	2020-11-11	2026-10-02	11	0	
Volodymyr Brazhko	22 January 2002 (age 24)	MF	2024-03-21	2026-10-02	11	0	
Vasyl Kobin	24 May 1985 (age 41)	DF-MF	2009-09-05	2011-06-06	11	0	
Yehor Nazaryna	10 July 1997 (age 29)	MF	2023-09-09	2026-10-02	11	0	
Oleksandr Svatok	27 September 1994 (age 32)	DF	2023-03-26	2025-11-16	11	0	
Ihor Zhabchenko	1 July 1968 (age 58)	DF-MF	1992-10-28	1996-05-01	11	0	
Danylo Sikan	16 April 2001 (age 25)	FW	2021-09-01	2026-10-02	10	2	
Serhiy Kovalyov	21 November 1971 (age 54)	MF	1998-08-19	2000-04-26	10	1	
Serhiy Kravchenko	24 April 1983 (age 43)	MF	2008-05-24	2013-06-07	10	1	
Yuriy Sak	3 January 1967 (age 59)	DF-MF	1992-04-29	1994-09-07	10	1	
Oleh Venhlynskyi	21 March 1978 (age 48)	FW	1998-07-15	2005-10-12	10	1	
Serhiy Kovalets	5 September 1968 (age 58)	MF	1992-04-29	1994-11-13	10	0	
Pavlo Shkapenko	16 December 1972	DF-MF	1993-05-18	1997-06-07	10	0	17 April 2023 (aged 50)
Andriy Polunin	5 March 1971	MF	1992-10-28	1995-11-11	9	1	15 November 2025 (aged 54)
Serhiy Diryavka	18 April 1971 (age 55)	DF	1992-10-28	1995-04-26	9	0	
Vitaliy Reva	19 November 1974 (age 51)	GK	2001-10-06	2003-04-02	9	0	
Serhiy Rybalka	1 April 1990 (age 36)	MF	2015-03-31	2016-05-29	9	0	
Yehor Yarmolyuk	1 March 2004 (age 22)	MF	2025-03-20	2026-03-31	9	0	
Serhiy Zakarlyuka	17 August 1976	MF	2002-03-21	2004-10-13	9	0	6 October 2014 (aged 38)
Mykyta Burda	24 April 1995 (age 31)	DF	2018-05-31	2019-09-10	8	0	
Andriy Dykan	16 July 1977 (age 49)	GK	2010-06-02	2012-02-29	8	0	
Volodymyr Homenyuk	19 July 1985 (age 41)	FW	2008-06-01	2009-09-05	8	0	
Yevhen Levchenko	2 January 1978 (age 48)	MF	2002-11-20	2009-02-11	8	0	
Maksym Levytskyi	26 November 1972 (age 53)	GK	2000-05-31	2002-03-27	8	0	
Oleksandr Romanchuk	21 October 1984 (age 41)	DF	2007-02-07	2011-02-09	8	0	
Oleksandr Rykun	6 May 1978 (age 48)	MF	2002-03-21	2006-08-15	8	0	
Serhiy Shmatovalenko	20 January 1967 (age 59)	DF	1992-08-26	1996-05-01	8	0	
Maksym Talovyerov	28 June 2000 (age 26)	DF	2024-03-21	2025-06-10	8	0	
Hryhoriy Yarmash	4 January 1985 (age 41)	DF	2008-05-24	2009-08-12	8	0	
Artem Yashkin	29 April 1975 (age 51)	MF	2000-09-02	2001-06-02	8	0	
Oleksandr Yevtushok	11 January 1970 (age 56)	DF	1994-09-07	1998-08-19	8	0	
Yevhen Shakhov	30 November 1990 (age 35)	MF	2016-09-05	2019-11-17	7	1	
Denys Boyko	29 January 1988 (age 38)	GK	2014-11-18	2021-09-08	7	0	
Yuriy Bukel	28 June 1971 (age 55)	DF	1993-10-16	1995-10-29	7	0	
Oleksandr Kosyrin	18 June 1977 (age 49)	FW	2003-10-11	2005-08-15	7	0	
Serhiy Lezhentsev	4 August 1971 (age 55)	DF	1993-10-16	1996-08-13	7	0	
Serhiy Mizin	25 September 1972 (age 54)	MF	1995-03-25	2003-10-11	7	0	
Oleksandr Nazarenko	1 February 2000 (age 26)	MF	2024-10-11	2026-10-02	7	0	
Volodymyr Shepelyev	1 June 1997 (age 29)	MF	2017-06-06	2020-10-07	7	0	
Eduard Tsykhmeystruk	24 June 1973 (age 53)	MF	1998-07-15	1999-09-08	7	0	
Dmytro Tyapushkin	6 November 1964 (age 61)	GK	1994-03-15	1995-03-29	7	0	
Danylo Ihnatenko	13 March 1997 (age 29)	MF	2022-06-08	2023-06-12	6	1	
Pylyp Budkivskyi	10 March 1992 (age 34)	FW	2014-10-12	2015-03-31	6	0	
Serhiy Kandaurov	2 February 1972 (age 54)	MF	1992-08-26	2000-05-31	6	0	
Andriy Khomyn	24 May 1968	DF	1993-10-16	1995-03-29	6	0	29 September 1999 (aged 31)
Ihor Khudobyak	20 February 1985 (age 41)	MF	2010-05-29	2011-06-06	6	0	
Hennadiy Moroz	27 March 1975 (age 51)	DF	1999-10-09	2002-10-12	6	0	
Dmytro Riznyk	30 January 1999 (age 27)	GK	2021-11-11	2026-10-02	6	0	
Nazar Voloshyn	17 June 2003 (age 23)	MF	2025-09-05	2026-03-31	6	0	
Valeriy Vorobyov	14 January 1970 (age 56)	GK	1994-08-26	1999-08-18	6	0	
Serhiy Zadorozhnyi	20 February 1976 (age 50)	DF	2001-08-15	2002-05-19	6	0	
Matviy Ponomarenko	11 January 2006 (age 20)	FW	2026-03-26	2026-10-02	5	1	
Serhiy Bolbat	13 June 1993 (age 33)	MF	2014-05-22	2019-11-14	5	0	
Artem Bondarenko	21 August 2000 (age 26)	MF	2025-09-05	2026-05-31	5	0	
Vyacheslav Checher	15 December 1980 (age 45)	DF	2004-02-18	2004-10-13	5	0	
Serhiy Husyev	1 July 1967 (age 59)	FW	1992-04-29	1993-06-26	5	0	
Vyacheslav Kernozenko	4 June 1976 (age 50)	GK	2000-05-31	2008-05-24	5	0	
Vitaliy Lysytskyi	16 April 1982 (age 44)	MF	2001-02-14	2002-11-20	5	0	
Roman Maksymyuk	14 June 1974	MF-FW	1998-08-19	2002-09-07	5	0	2025
Ivan Petryak	13 March 1994 (age 32)	MF	2016-03-24	2018-10-10	5	0	
Volodymyr Polyovyi	28 July 1985 (age 41)	DF	2010-05-25	2010-10-11	5	0	
Oleksandr Pryzetko	31 January 1971 (age 55)	MF-FW	1992-08-26	2001-02-28	5	0	
Eduard Sarapiy	19 May 1999 (age 27)	DF	2026-03-31	2026-10-02	5	0	
Dmytro Shutkov	3 April 1972 (age 54)	GK	1993-10-16	2003-06-07	5	0	
Dmytro Topchiyev	25 September 1966 (age 60)	DF-MF	1992-10-28	1993-10-23	5	0	
Oleksandr Horshkov	8 February 1970 (age 56)	MF	2003-03-29	2003-09-10	4	2	
Borys Finkel	2 February 1968 (age 58)	FW	1994-08-26	1994-09-13	4	1	
Ivan Hetsko	6 April 1968 (age 58)	FW	1992-04-29	1997-10-29	4	1	
Denys Holaydo	3 June 1984 (age 42)	MF-DF	2008-03-26	2008-10-11	4	0	
Dmytro Khomchenovskyi	16 April 1990 (age 36)	MF	2013-08-14	2014-11-18	4	0	
Oleksandr Koval	3 May 1974 (age 52)	MF	1994-09-11	1999-03-20	4	0	
Kyrylo Kovalchuk	11 June 1986 (age 40)	MF	2014-09-03	2014-11-18	4	0	
Denys Kozhanov	13 June 1987 (age 39)	MF	2010-09-04	2011-06-06	4	0	
Ihor Kutepov	17 December 1965 (age 60)	GK	1992-04-29	1993-10-23	4	0	
Hennadiy Lytovchenko	11 September 1963 (age 63)	MF	1993-10-16	1994-11-13	4	0	
Ihor Plastun	20 August 1990 (age 36)	DF	2018-11-16	2019-11-14	4	0	
Oleksandr Pomazun	11 October 1971 (age 55)	GK	1992-06-27	1993-05-18	4	0	
Bohdan Shershun	14 May 1981	DF	2003-10-11	2006-10-10	4	0	7 January 2024 (aged 42)
Bohdan Shust	4 March 1986 (age 40)	GK	2006-02-28	2007-02-07	4	0	
Serhiy Tkachenko	10 February 1979 (age 47)	MF	2003-08-20	2006-09-06	4	0	
Andriy Vasylytchuk	23 October 1965 (age 60)	DF-MF	1993-10-16	1994-05-25	4	0	
Oleksandr Zotov	23 February 1975 (age 51)	MF	1996-05-01	2002-05-19	4	0	
Volodymyr Musolitin	11 March 1973 (age 53)	FW	2002-05-17	2002-08-21	3	1	
Serhiy Valyayev	16 September 1978 (age 48)	MF	2008-11-19	2009-04-01	3	1	
Serhiy Buletsa	19 February 1999 (age 27)	MF	2021-09-08	2021-10-12	3	0	
Volodymyr Horilyi	11 October 1965 (age 61)	DF	1995-06-11	1995-11-11	3	0	
Oleksandr Hranovskyi	11 March 1976 (age 50)	DF	2001-02-26	2001-08-15	3	0	
Oleksandr Hrytsay	30 March 1977 (age 49)	MF-DF	2007-08-22	2007-11-21	3	0	
Vladyslav Kabayev	1 September 1995 (age 31)	MF	2024-09-07	2025-06-10	3	0	
Taras Kacharaba	7 January 1995 (age 31)	DF	2021-09-08	2022-09-24	3	0	
Ihor Kharatin	2 February 1995 (age 31)	MF	2020-09-06	2020-11-11	3	0	
Oleksandr Kovpak	2 February 1983 (age 43)	FW	2013-06-02	2013-08-14	3	0	
Oleh Krasnoperov	25 July 1980 (age 46)	MF-DF	2008-11-19	2010-09-07	3	0	
Dmytro Kryskiv	6 October 2000 (age 26)	MF	2024-10-11	2024-11-16	3	0	
Oleh Kuznetsov	22 March 1963 (age 63)	DF	1992-10-28	1994-11-13	3	0	
Maksym Malyshev	24 December 1992 (age 33)	MF	2016-03-24	2017-06-06	3	0	
Serhiy Matyukhin	21 March 1980 (age 46)	DF	2004-03-31	2005-03-30	3	0	
Yuriy Nikiforov	16 September 1970 (age 56)	DF-MF	1992-04-29	1992-08-26	3	0	
Denys Onyschenko	15 September 1978 (age 48)	MF	2002-03-27	2004-02-18	3	0	
Ihor Oshchypko	25 October 1986 (age 39)	DF	2010-05-29	2011-03-29	3	0	
Ihor Petrov	30 January 1964 (age 62)	MF	1994-09-07	1994-11-13	3	0	
Denys Popov	17 February 1999 (age 27)	DF	2021-05-23	2022-06-14	3	0	
Vladyslav Prudius	22 June 1973 (age 53)	MF	1993-10-16	1993-10-23	3	0	
Oleksandr Spivak	9 January 1975 (age 51)	MF	2001-06-02	2002-09-07	3	0	
Andriy Telesnenko	12 April 1966 (age 60)	MF	1994-08-26	1995-03-29	3	0	
Ilya Tsymbalar	17 June 1969	MF	1992-04-29	1992-08-26	3	0	28 December 2013 (aged 44)
Yuriy Hudymenko	10 March 1966 (age 60)	FW	1992-06-27	1992-08-26	2	1	
Viktor Korniyenko	14 February 1999 (age 27)	DF	2021-09-08	2021-10-09	2	1	
Adrian Pukanych	22 June 1983 (age 43)	MF	2003-06-11	2004-02-18	2	1	
Oleksiy Antonov	8 May 1986 (age 40)	FW	2011-08-10	2014-05-22	2	0	
Serhiy Atelkin	8 January 1972	FW	1997-10-11	1997-10-29	2	0	1 October 2020 (aged 48)
Ilya Blyznyuk	28 July 1973 (age 53)	GK	1996-08-13	1997-03-23	2	0	
Stanyslav Bohush	25 October 1983 (age 42)	GK	2008-11-19	2009-06-10	2	0	
Oleksandr Bondarenko	29 June 1966 (age 60)	DF	1992-06-27	1992-08-26	2	0	
Andriy Boryachuk	23 April 1996 (age 30)	FW	2018-11-16	2018-11-20	2	0	
Yevhen Cheberko	23 January 1998 (age 28)	DF	2020-10-07	2025-06-10	2	0	
Yevhen Cheberyachko	19 June 1983 (age 43)	DF	2010-08-11	2011-08-10	2	0	
Oleh Dopilka	12 March 1986 (age 40)	DF	2008-02-06	2008-03-26	2	0	
Yevhen Drahunov	13 February 1964	DF	1992-06-27	1992-08-26	2	0	10 September 2001 (aged 37)
Yuriy Dudnyk	26 September 1968 (age 58)	MF	1992-08-26	1992-10-28	2	0	
Oleksandr Haydash	7 February 1967 (age 59)	FW	1993-04-27	1993-05-18	2	0	
Oleksandr Horyainov	29 June 1975 (age 51)	GK	2010-05-25	2012-06-01	2	0	
Dmytro Hrechyshkin	22 September 1991 (age 35)	MF	2013-03-26	2013-08-14	2	0	
Artem Hromov	14 January 1990 (age 36)	MF	2014-09-03	2014-09-08	2	0	
Yuriy Hrytsyna	15 June 1971 (age 55)	MF	1993-05-18	1993-06-26	2	0	
Vitaliy Fedoriv	21 October 1987 (age 38)	DF	2008-02-06	2011-02-08	2	0	
Maksym Koval	9 December 1992 (age 33)	GK	2012-06-01	2017-11-10	2	0	
Andriy Kovtun	28 February 1968 (age 58)	GK	1993-04-27	1993-06-26	2	0	
Denys Kulakov	1 May 1986 (age 40)	MF-DF	2010-09-04	2010-10-08	2	0	
Oleksandr Kyryukhin	1 October 1974 (age 52)	DF-MF	1999-03-20	1999-08-18	2	0	
Yevhen Lutsenko	1 November 1980 (age 45)	MF	2003-10-11	2004-02-18	2	0	
Ihor Luchkevych	19 November 1973 (age 52)	MF	1996-08-13	1996-08-31	2	0	
Taras Mykhavko	30 May 2005 (age 21)	DF	2025-11-13	2026-09-28	2	0	
Mykola Mykhaylenko	22 May 2001 (age 25)	MF	2025-06-07	2025-06-10	2	0	
Oleksiy Mykhaylychenko	30 March 1963 (age 63)	MF	1992-10-28	1994-10-12	2	0	
Oleksandr Palyanytsya	29 February 1972 (age 54)	FW	1995-06-11	1999-08-18	2	0	
Pavlo Pashayev	4 January 1988 (age 38)	DF	2009-02-10	2009-02-11	2	0	
Oleksandr Rybka	10 April 1987 (age 39)	GK	2011-10-11	2011-11-11	2	0	
Volodymyr Savchenko	9 September 1973 (age 53)	GK	1994-09-11	1994-09-13	2	0	
Serhiy Scherbakov	15 August 1971 (age 55)	MF	1992-04-29	1992-06-27	2	0	
Artem Shabanov	7 March 1992 (age 34)	DF	2017-11-10	2019-11-14	2	0	
Maryan Shved	16 July 1997 (age 29)	DF	2018-11-20	2019-11-14	2	0	
Anton Shynder	13 June 1987 (age 39)	FW	2011-09-06	2012-11-14	2	0	
Valentyn Slyusar	15 September 1977 (age 49)	MF	2008-11-19	2009-04-01	2	0	
Serhiy Snytko	31 March 1975 (age 51)	MF	2001-02-26	2001-02-28	2	0	
Maksym Startsev	20 January 1980 (age 46)	GK	2005-08-17	2005-10-12	2	0	
Oleksiy Sych	1 April 2001 (age 25)	DF	2024-11-19	2025-03-20	2	0	
Serhiy Symonenko	12 June 1981 (age 45)	DF	2004-02-18	2004-03-31	2	0	
Oleksandr Syrota	11 June 2000 (age 26)	DF	2021-09-08	2022-06-08	2	0	
Serhiy Tretyak	7 September 1963 (age 63)	DF	1992-04-29	1992-06-27	2	0	
Yuriy Virt	4 May 1975 (age 51)	GK	2001-09-01	2001-09-05	2	0	
Serhiy Yesin	2 April 1975 (age 51)	MF	1996-10-05	1996-11-09	2	0	
Oleksandr Andriyevskyi	25 June 1994 (age 32)	MF	2017-11-10	2017-11-10	1	0	
Andriy Annenkov	21 January 1969 (age 57)	DF-MF	1992-08-26	1992-08-26	1	0	
Oleksiy Antyukhin	25 November 1971 (age 54)	FW	1996-04-09	1996-04-09	1	0	
Kostyantyn Balabanov	13 August 1982 (age 44)	FW	2004-02-18	2004-02-18	1	0	
Aleksei Bakharev	12 October 1976	MF	2002-08-21	2002-08-21	1	0	18 March 2022 (aged 45)
Ruslan Bidnenko	20 July 1981 (age 45)	MF	2004-06-06	2004-06-06	1	0	
Andriy Bohdanov	21 January 1990 (age 36)	MF	2013-02-06	2013-02-06	1	0	
Oleksandr Chyzhevskyi	27 May 1971 (age 55)	DF	1998-07-15	1998-07-15	1	0	
Serhiy Danylovskyi	20 August 1981 (age 45)	MF	2007-08-22	2007-08-22	1	0	
Denys Dedechko	2 July 1987 (age 39)	MF	2013-08-14	2013-08-14	1	0	
Oleksandr Drambayev	21 April 2001 (age 25)	DF	2026-09-25	2026-09-25	1	0	
Mykola Ischenko	9 March 1983 (age 43)	DF	2011-06-06	2011-06-06	1	0	
Dmytro Ivanisenya	11 January 1994 (age 32)	MF	2019-11-14	2019-11-14	1	0	
Oleksiy Ivanov	9 January 1978 (age 48)	MF	2002-08-21	2002-08-21	1	0	
Taras Kabanov	23 January 1981 (age 45)	FW	2004-02-18	2004-02-18	1	0	
Mykyta Kamenyuka	3 June 1985 (age 41)	DF	2016-03-24	2016-03-24	1	0	
Maksym Khlan	27 January 2003 (age 23)	MF	2026-09-28	2026-09-28	1	0	
Yaroslav Khoma	17 February 1974 (age 52)	MF	2001-02-14	2001-02-14	1	0	
Rustam Khudzhamov	5 October 1982 (age 44)	GK	2009-02-11	2009-02-11	1	0	
Vladyslav Kocherhin	30 April 1996 (age 30)	MF	2021-09-08	2021-09-08	1	0	
Yuriy Kolomoyets	22 March 1990 (age 36)	FW	2017-11-10	2017-11-10	1	0	
Ihor Kostyuk	14 September 1975 (age 51)	MF	2000-04-26	2000-04-26	1	0	
Ihor Krasnopir	1 December 2002 (age 23)	FW	2026-09-25	2026-09-25	1	0	
Illya Krupskyi	2 October 2004 (age 22)	DF	2026-09-25	2026-09-25	1	0	
Pavlo Ksyonz	2 January 1987 (age 39)	MF-DF	2015-06-09	2015-06-09	1	0	
Oleksandr Maksymov	13 February 1985 (age 41)	MF	2005-10-12	2005-10-12	1	0	
Yuriy Martynov	5 June 1965 (age 61)	FW	1995-03-25	1995-03-25	1	0	
Oleksandr Martynyuk	25 November 2001 (age 24)	DF	2025-06-10	2025-06-10	1	0	
Yuri Moroz	8 September 1970 (age 56)	MF	1992-06-27	1992-06-27	1	0	
Valentyn Moskvyn	4 May 1968 (age 58)	MF-FW	1992-10-28	1992-10-28	1	0	
Anatoliy Mushchynka	19 August 1970 (age 56)	MF	1993-04-27	1993-04-27	1	0	
Serhiy Myakushko	15 April 1993 (age 33)	MF	2017-11-10	2017-11-10	1	0	
Oleh Naduda	23 February 1971 (age 55)	MF	1995-04-26	1995-04-26	1	0	
Serhiy Perkhun	4 September 1977	GK	2001-08-15	2001-08-15	1	0	28 August 2001 (aged 23)
Serhiy Pohodin	29 April 1968 (age 58)	MF-FW	1992-04-29	1992-04-29	1	0	
Ihor Pokydko	15 February 1965 (age 61)	DF	1992-06-27	1992-06-27	1	0	
Oleksandr Poklonskyi	22 January 1975 (age 51)	DF	2002-05-17	2002-05-17	1	0	
Oleh Protasov	4 February 1964 (age 62)	FW	1994-09-07	1994-09-07	1	0	
Artem Putivtsev	29 August 1988 (age 38)	DF	2016-03-24	2016-03-24	1	0	
Andriy Pylyavskyi	4 December 1988 (age 37)	DF	2014-11-18	2014-11-18	1	0	
Oleksandr Romanchuk	16 December 1999 (age 26)	DF	2026-05-31	2026-05-31	1	0	
Oleg Salenko	25 October 1969 (age 56)	FW	1992-04-29	1992-04-29	1	0	
Volodymyr Sharan	18 September 1971 (age 55)	MF	1995-11-11	1995-11-11	1	0	
Yuriy Shelepnytskyi	31 July 1965 (age 61)	DF-MF	1992-04-29	1992-04-29	1	0	
Oleksandr Svystunov	30 August 1973 (age 53)	MF	2001-02-26	2001-02-26	1	0	
Hennadiy Synchuk	10 July 2006 (age 20)	MF	2026-05-31	2026-05-31	1	0	
Akhrik Tsveiba	10 September 1966 (age 60)	DF	1992-08-26	1992-08-26	1	0	
Serhiy Turyanskyi	25 May 1962 (age 64)	FW	1994-03-15	1994-03-15	1	0	
Yaroslav Vatamanyuk	25 May 1963 (age 63)	DF	1992-06-27	1992-06-27	1	0	
Vladyslav Veleten	1 October 2002 (age 24)	MF	2025-10-10	2025-10-10	1	0	
Vitaliy Vernydub	17 October 1987 (age 39)	DF	2014-11-18	2014-11-18	1	0	
Mykola Volosyanko	13 March 1972	DF	1996-08-13	1996-08-13	1	0	6 June 2012 (aged 40)
Dmytro Yakovenko	6 May 1971 (age 55)	MF	1993-05-18	1993-05-18	1	0	
Oleksandr Yakovenko	23 July 1987 (age 39)	MF	2010-06-02	2010-06-02	1	0	
Oleksandr Yatsenko	24 February 1985 (age 41)	DF	2005-10-12	2005-10-12	1	0	
Andriy Yudin	28 June 1967 (age 59)	DF-MF	1992-08-26	1992-08-26	1	0	
Mykola Yurchenko	31 March 1966 (age 60)	MF	1994-03-15	1994-03-15	1	0	

== Key ==
- GK: Goalkeeper
- DF: Defender
- MF: Midfielder
- FW: Forward

== See also ==
- Ukrainians on the Soviet Union national football team
- List of Ukraine national football team captains
