= Ukraine national football team rosters =

List of all Ukraine national football team rosters per each competition cycle (seasons) without exhibition/friendly matches.

== UEFA Euro 1996 ==
=== Qualifying ===
==== Group 4 ====
Pos	Team	Pld	W	D	L	GF	GA	GD	Pts	Qualification	(Croatia)	(Italy)	(Lithuania)	(Ukraine)	(Slovenia)	(Estonia)
1	Croatia	10	7	2	1	22	5	+17	23 (Note: Head-to-head points: Croatia 4, Italy 1.)	Qualify for final tournament	—	1–1	2–0	**4–0**	2–0	7–1
2	Italy	10	7	2	1	20	6	+14	23	Qualify for final tournament	1–2	—	4–0	**3–1**	1–0	4–1
3	Lithuania	10	5	1	4	13	12	+1	16		0–0	0–1	—	**1–3**	2–1	5–0
**4**	Ukraine	**10**	**4**	**1**	**5**	**11**	**15**	**−4**	13		**1–0**	**0–2**	**0–2**	—	**0–0**	**3–0**
5	Slovenia	10	3	2	5	13	13	0	11		1–2	1–1	1–2	**3–2**	—	3–0
6	Estonia	10	0	0	10	3	31	−28	0		0–2	0–2	0–1	**0–1**	1–3	—

Source: UEFA

=== Team roster ===
- Head coach: Oleh Bazylevych 0-0-1/0-2
- Head coach: Yozhef Sabo 1-1-0/3-0
- Head coach: Anatoliy Konkov 3-0-4/8-13

#	Name	Birth date	Club(s)	Games	Goals
Goalkeepers
	Oleh Suslov	2.01.1969	Chornomorets Odesa	6	(-7)
	Dmytro Tyapushkin	6.11.1964	(Russia) Spartak Moscow	4	(-8)
	Oleksandr Shovkovskyi	2.01.1975	Dynamo Kyiv	1	0
	Dmytro Shutkov	3.04.1972	Shakhtar Donetsk	0	0
Defenders
	Oleh Luzhnyi*******	5.08.1968	Dynamo Kyiv	8	0
	Viktor Skrypnyk	19.11.1969	Dnipro Dnipropetrovsk	5	1
	Oleksandr Holovko	6.01.1972	Tavriya Simferopol → Dynamo Kyiv	4	0
	**Serhiy Shmatovalenko**	20.01.1967	Dynamo Kyiv	4	0
	Serhiy Bezhenar	9.08.1970	Dnipro Dnipropetrovsk → Dynamo Kyiv	4	0
	Volodymyr Horilyi	11.10.1965	Dnipro Dnipropetrovsk	3	0
	Serhiy Popov	22.04.1971	Shakhtar Donetsk	3	0
	**Oleh Kuznetsov**	22.03.1963	(Israel) Maccabi Haifa	2	0
	Serhiy Lezhentsev	4.08.1971	Dynamo Kyiv	2	0
	Yuriy Bukel	30.11.1971	Chornomorets Odesa	2	0
	Andriy Telesnenko	12.04.1966	Chornomorets Odesa	2	0
	Serhiy Diryavka	12.04.1966	Dnipro Dnipropetrovsk	2	0
	Andriy Khomyn	24.05.1968	Dynamo Kyiv	1	0
Midfielders
	Hennadiy Orbu	23.07.1970	Shakhtar Donetsk	8	0
	Serhiy Konovalov	1.03.1972	Dnipro Dnipropetrovsk → Dynamo Kyiv	6	1
	Yuriy Kalitvintsev	5.05.1968	Dynamo Kyiv	6	1
	Oleksandr Yevtushok	11.01.1970	Karpaty Lviv → Dnipro Dnipropetrovsk	6	0
	Yevhen Pokhlebayev	25.11.1971	Dnipro Dnipropetrovsk → Dynamo Kyiv	5	0
	Ihor Zhabchenko	1.07.1968	Chornomorets Odesa	4	0
	Serhiy Kovalets	5.09.1968	Dynamo Kyiv	3	0
	Ihor Petrov*	30.01.1964	Shakhtar Donetsk	3	0
	Yuriy Maksymov*	8.12.1968	Dnipro Dnipropetrovsk → Dynamo Kyiv	3	0
	Andriy Husin	11.12.1972	CSKA-Borysfen Kyiv	2	1
	Andriy Polunin	5.03.1971	Dnipro Dnipropetrovsk	2	1
	Serhiy Mizin	25.09.1972	Dynamo Kyiv	2	0
	Yuriy Sak	3.01.1967	Chornomorets Odesa	1	0
	**Oleksiy Mykhaylychenko**	30.03.1963	(Scotland) Rangers F.C.	1	0
	Dmytro Mykhaylenko	13.07.1973	Dynamo Kyiv	1	0
	**Hennadiy Lytovchenko***	11.09.1963	(Austria) Admira Wacker	1	0
	Oleh Naduda	23.02.1971	(Russia) Spartak Moscow	1	0
	Pavlo Shkapenko	16.12.1972	Dynamo Kyiv	1	0
	Volodymyr Sharan	18.09.1971	Dnipro Dnipropetrovsk	1	0
Forwards
	Tymerlan Huseynov	24.01.1968	Chornomorets Odesa	7	5
	Serhiy Nahornyak	5.09.1971	Nyva Vinnytsia → (Russia) Spartak Moscow → Dnipro Dnipropetrovsk	5	0
	Viktor Leonenko	5.10.1969	Dynamo Kyiv	3	0
	Andriy Shevchenko	29.09.1976	Dynamo Kyiv	2	0
	Borys Finkel	2.02.1968	Dnipro Dnipropetrovsk	1	0
	**Oleh Protasov**	4.02.1964	(Japan) Gamba Osaka	1	0
	Serhiy Skachenko	18.11.1972	Dynamo Kyiv	1	0
	Yuriy Martynov	5.06.1965	Zirka-NIBAS Kirovohrad	1	0
	Oleksandr Palyanytsya	29.02.1972	Dnipro Dnipropetrovsk	1	0
	Oleksiy Antyukhin	25.11.1971	Tavriya Simferopol	0	0

Notes:

- (*) Asterisk next to player's name indicates number of matches he played as the team's captain, green color highlights the player who most often served as the team's captain.
- In **bold** are players who played in previous cycles.

== 1998 FIFA World Cup ==
=== Qualifying ===
==== Group 9 ====
Pos	Team	Pld	W	D	L	GF	GA	GD	Pts	Qualification	Germany national football team	Ukraine national football team	Portugal national football team	Armenia national football team	Northern Ireland national football team	Albania national football team
1	Germany	10	6	4	0	23	9	+14	22	Qualification to 1998 FIFA World Cup	—	**2–0**	1–1	4–0	1–1	4–3
**2**	Ukraine	**10**	**6**	**2**	**2**	**10**	**6**	**+4**	20	**Advance to second round**	**0–0**	—	**2–1**	**1–1**	**2–1**	**1–0**
3	Portugal	10	5	4	1	12	4	+8	19		0–0	**1–0**	—	3–1	1–0	2–0
4	Armenia	10	1	5	4	8	17	−9	8		1–5	**0–2**	0–0	—	0–0	3–0
5	Northern Ireland	10	1	4	5	6	10	−4	7		1–3	**0–1**	0–0	1–1	—	2–0
6	Albania	10	1	1	8	7	20	−13	4		2–3	**0–1**	0–3	1–1	1–0	—

==== Second round ====
Team 1	Agg.	Team 2	1st leg	2nd leg
**Croatia**	3–1	Ukraine	2–0	1–1

=== Team roster ===
- Head coach: Yozhef Sabo 6-3-3/11-9

#	Name	Birth date	Club(s)	Games	Goals
Goalkeepers
	**Oleksandr Shovkovskyi**	2.01.1975	Dynamo Kyiv	9	(-7)
	**Oleh Suslov**	2.01.1969	Chornomorets Odesa → Austria Salzburg	3	(-2)
	Illya Blyznyuk	28.07.1973	Dnipro Dnipropetrovsk	0	0
	Dmytro Shutkov	3.04.1972	Shakhtar Donetsk	0	0
	Vyacheslav Kernozenko	4.06.1976	Dynamo Kyiv	0	0
Defenders
	**Oleksandr Holovko**	6.01.1972	Dynamo Kyiv	12	0
	**Viktor Skrypnyk**	19.11.1969	(Germany) Werder Bremen	8	0
	**Oleh Luzhnyi**	5.08.1968	Dynamo Kyiv	8	0
	Vladyslav Vashchuk	2.01.1975	Dynamo Kyiv	8	0
	Yuriy Dmytrulin	10.02.1975	Dynamo Kyiv	8	0
	**Serhiy Bezhenar**	9.08.1970	Dynamo Kyiv	7	0
	**Serhiy Popov**	22.04.1971	(Russia) Zenit Saint Petersburg	4	1
	Mykhaylo Starostyak	13.10.1973	Shakhtar Donetsk	2	0
	Dmytro Parfyonov	11.09.1974	Chornomorets Odesa → Dnipro Dnipropetrovsk	1	0
	Oleksandr Koval	3.05.1974	Shakhtar Donetsk	1	0
	Yuriy Benyo	25.04.1974	Karpaty Lviv	0	0
	**Serhiy Shmatovalenko**	20.01.1967	Dynamo Kyiv	0	0
	Mykola Volosyanko	13.03.1972	Dynamo Kyiv	0	0
Midfielders
	Vitaliy Kosovskyi	11.08.1973	Dynamo Kyiv	10	1
	Yuriy Kalitvintsev*********	5.05.1968	Dynamo Kyiv	9	0
	Yuriy Maksymov***	8.12.1968	Dynamo Kyiv	8	2
	Valeriy Kryventsov	30.07.1973	Shakhtar Donetsk	8	0
	**Dmytro Mykhaylenko**	13.07.1973	Dynamo Kyiv	7	0
	**Hennadiy Orbu**	23.07.1970	(Russia) Rotor Volgograd → Shakhtar Donetsk	6	0
	Hennadiy Zubov	12.09.1977	Shakhtar Donetsk	5	0
	**Andriy Husin**	11.12.1972	Dynamo Kyiv	5	0
	Serhiy Yesin	2.04.1975	Tavriya Simferopol	2	0
	Vasyl Kardash	14.01.1973	Dynamo Kyiv	2	0
	Ihor Luchkevych	19.11.1973	Metalurh Zaporizhia	1	0
	Pavlo Shkapenko	16.12.1972	Dynamo Kyiv	1	0
Forwards
	Serhiy Rebrov	3.06.1974	Dynamo Kyiv	12	3
	**Andriy Shevchenko**	29.09.1976	Dynamo Kyiv	8	4
	**Serhiy Nahornyak**	5.09.1971	Dnipro Dnipropetrovsk	5	0
	**Ivan Hetsko**	6.04.1968	Dnipro Dnipropetrovsk	2	0
	Serhiy Atelkin	8.01.1972	Shakhtar Donetsk	2	0
	**Viktor Leonenko**	5.10.1969	Dynamo Kyiv	1	0
	**Tymerlan Huseynov**	24.01.1968	Chornomorets Odesa	1	0

Notes:

- (*) Asterisk next to player's name indicates number of matches he played as the team's captain, green color highlights the player who most often served as the team's captain.
- In **bold** are players who played in previous cycles.

== UEFA Euro 2000 ==
=== Qualifying ===
==== Group 4 ====
Pos	Team	Pld	W	D	L	GF	GA	GD	Pts	Qualification	(France)	(Ukraine)	(Russia)	(Iceland)	(Armenia)	(Andorra)
1	France	10	6	3	1	17	10	+7	21	Qualify for final tournament	—	**0–0**	2–3	3–2	2–0	2–0
**2**	Ukraine	**10**	**5**	**5**	**0**	**14**	**4**	**+10**	20	**Advance to play-offs**	**0–0**	—	**3–2**	**1–1**	**2–0**	**4–0**
3	Russia	10	6	1	3	22	12	+10	19		2–3	**1–1**	—	1–0	2–0	6–1
4	Iceland	10	4	3	3	12	7	+5	15		1–1	**0–1**	1–0	—	2–0	3–0
5	Armenia	10	2	2	6	8	15	−7	8		2–3	**0–0**	0–3	0–0	—	3–1
6	Andorra	10	0	0	10	3	28	−25	0		0–1	**0–2**	1–2	0–2	0–3	—

Source: UEFA

==== Play-offs ====
Team 1	Agg.	Team 2	1st leg	2nd leg
**Slovenia**	3–2	Ukraine	2–1	1–1

=== Team roster ===
- Head coach: Yozhef Sabo 5-6-1/16-7

#	Name	Birth date	Club(s)	Games	Goals
Goalkeepers
	**Oleksandr Shovkovskyi**	2.01.1975	Dynamo Kyiv	10	(-7)
	Valeriy Vorobyov	14.01.1970	(Russia) Torpedo Moscow	2	0
	Oleksandr Lavrentsov	15.12.1972	Kryvbas Kryvyi Rih	0	0
	**Vyacheslav Kernozenko**	4.06.1976	Dynamo Kyiv	0	0
Defenders
	**Vladyslav Vashchuk**	2.01.1975	Dynamo Kyiv	12	1
	Oleksandr Holovko**	6.01.1972	Dynamo Kyiv	12	0
	**Serhiy Popov**	22.04.1971	Shakhtar Donetsk	11	2
	Oleh Luzhnyi**********	5.08.1968	Dynamo Kyiv → (England) Arsenal	10	0
	**Yuriy Dmytrulin**	10.02.1975	Dynamo Kyiv	9	1
	Volodymyr Mykytin	28.04.1970	Karpaty Lviv → Shakhtar Donetsk	9	0
	Hennadiy Moroz	27.03.1975	Kryvbas Kryvyi Rih	2	0
	**Viktor Skrypnyk**	19.11.1969	(Germany) Werder Bremen	1	0
	**Dmytro Parfyonov**	11.09.1974	(Russia) Spartak Moscow	1	0
	Serhiy Fedorov	18.02.1975	Dynamo Kyiv	1	0
	**Mykhaylo Starostyak**	13.10.1973	Shakhtar Donetsk	0	0
	Volodymyr Yezerskiy	15.11.1976	Karpaty Lviv	0	0
	**Oleksandr Koval**	3.05.1974	Shakhtar Donetsk	0	0
Midfielders
	**Andriy Husin**	11.12.1972	Dynamo Kyiv	10	2
	**Vitaliy Kosovskyi**	11.08.1973	Dynamo Kyiv	8	1
	**Yuriy Maksymov**	8.12.1968	(Germany) Werder Bremen	7	0
	Serhiy Kovalyov	21.11.1971	Shakhtar Donetsk	6	0
	Eduard Tsykhmeystruk	24.06.1973	CSKA Kyiv	4	0
	**Valeriy Kryventsov**	30.07.1973	Shakhtar Donetsk	3	0
	**Serhiy Konovalov**	1.03.1972	Dynamo Kyiv	3	0
	**Yuriy Kalitvintsev**	5.05.1968	Dynamo Kyiv → (Turkey) Trabzonspor	2	0
	**Vasyl Kardash**	14.01.1973	Dynamo Kyiv	2	0
	**Serhiy Mizin**	25.09.1972	Karpaty Lviv	2	0
	Serhiy Kandaurov	2.12.1972	(Portugal) Benfica	2	0
	**Dmytro Mykhaylenko**	13.07.1973	Dynamo Kyiv	1	0
	Roman Maksymyuk	14.06.1974	(Russia) Zenit Saint Petersburg	1	0
	Sergei Kormiltsev	22.01.1974	Dynamo Kyiv	0	0
Forwards
	**Serhiy Rebrov**	3.06.1974	Dynamo Kyiv	12	5
	**Andriy Shevchenko**	29.09.1976	Dynamo Kyiv → (Italy) Milan	12	2
	**Serhiy Skachenko**	18.11.1972	(Russia) Torpedo Moscow → (France) Metz	8	2
	**Serhiy Nahornyak**	5.09.1971	Shakhtar Donetsk	0	0
	**Oleksandr Palyanytsya**	29.02.1972	Karpaty Lviv → Kryvbas Kryvyi Rih	0	0

Notes:

- (*) Asterisk next to player's name indicates number of matches he played as the team's captain, green color highlights the player who most often served as the team's captain.
- In **bold** are players who played in previous cycles.

== 2002 FIFA World Cup ==
=== Qualifying ===
==== Group 5 ====
Pos	Team	Pld	W	D	L	GF	GA	GD	Pts	Qualification	Poland national football team	Ukraine national football team	Belarus national football team	Norway national football team	Wales national football team	Armenia national football team
1	Poland	10	6	3	1	21	11	+10	21	Qualification to 2002 FIFA World Cup	—	**1–1**	3–1	3–0	0–0	4–0
**2**	Ukraine	**10**	**4**	**5**	**1**	**13**	**8**	**+5**	17	**Advance to UEFA play-offs**	**1–3**	—	**0–0**	**0–0**	**1–1**	**3–0**
3	Belarus	10	4	3	3	12	11	+1	15		4–1	**0–2**	—	2–1	2–1	2–1
4	Norway	10	2	4	4	12	14	−2	10		2–3	**0–1**	1–1	—	3–2	0–0
5	Wales	10	1	6	3	10	12	−2	9		1–2	**1–1**	1–0	1–1	—	0–0
6	Armenia	10	0	5	5	7	19	−12	5		1–1	**2–3**	0–0	1–4	2–2	—

==== Play-offs ====
Team 1	Agg.	Team 2	1st leg	2nd leg
Ukraine	2–5	**Germany**	1–1	1–4

=== Team roster ===
- Head coach: Valeriy Lobanovskyi 4-6-2/15-13

#	Name	Birth date	Club(s)	Games	Goals
Goalkeepers
	**Oleksandr Shovkovskyi**	2.01.1975	Dynamo Kyiv	6	(-4)
	Maksym Levytskyi	2.01.1975	(France) Saint-Étienne → (Russia) Spartak Moscow	3	(-5)
	Yuriy Virt	4.05.1974	Shakhtar Donetsk	2	0
	Vitaliy Reva	19.11.1974	Dynamo Kyiv	1	(-1)
	**Vyacheslav Kernozenko**	4.06.1976	Dynamo Kyiv	1	(-3)
	Valeriy Vorobyov	14.01.1970	(Russia) Torpedo Moscow	0	0
	Mykola Medin	4.05.1972	Dnipro Dnipropetrovsk	0	0
Defenders
	Oleksandr Holovko**	6.01.1972	Dynamo Kyiv	12	0
	**Vladyslav Vashchuk**	2.01.1975	Dynamo Kyiv	12	0
	Oleh Luzhnyi**********	5.08.1968	(England) Arsenal	11	0
	Andriy Nesmachnyi	28.02.1979	Dynamo Kyiv	10	0
	**Yuriy Dmytrulin**	10.02.1975	Dynamo Kyiv	6	0
	**Serhiy Popov**	22.04.1971	Shakhtar Donetsk	6	0
	**Dmytro Parfyonov**	11.09.1974	(Russia) Spartak Moscow	6	0
	**Mykhaylo Starostyak**	13.10.1973	Shakhtar Donetsk	2	0
	**Serhiy Fedorov**	18.02.1975	Dynamo Kyiv	2	0
	**Viktor Skrypnyk**	19.11.1969	(Germany) Werder Bremen	1	0
	Serhiy Zadorozhnyi	20.02.1976	Dnipro Dnipropetrovsk	1	0
	Oleksandr Hranovskyi	11.03.1976	(Russia) Spartak Moscow	0	0
Midfielders
	Anatoliy Tymoshchuk	30.03.1979	Shakhtar Donetsk	10	0
	**Hennadiy Zubov**	12.09.1977	Shakhtar Donetsk	8	2
	Artem Yashkin	29.04.1975	Dynamo Kyiv	6	0
	**Andriy Husin**	11.12.1972	Dynamo Kyiv	5	1
	Serhiy Shyshchenko	13.01.1976	Metalurh Donetsk	4	0
	**Vasyl Kardash**	14.01.1973	Dynamo Kyiv	2	0
	**Vitaliy Kosovskyi**	11.08.1973	Dynamo Kyiv	1	0
	**Dmytro Mykhaylenko**	13.07.1973	Dynamo Kyiv	1	0
	Oleksandr Spivak	29.04.1975	(Russia) Zenit Saint Petersburg	1	0
	Serhiy Serebrennikov	1.09.1976	Dynamo Kyiv	1	0
	**Serhiy Konovalov**	1.03.1972	Dnipro Dnipropetrovsk	0	0
	**Serhiy Mizin**	25.09.1972	Metalist Kharkiv	0	0
Forwards
	**Andriy Shevchenko**	29.09.1976	(Italy) Milan	12	10
	Andriy Vorobey	18.11.1972	Shakhtar Donetsk	12	2
	**Serhiy Rebrov**	3.06.1974	(England) Tottenham Hotspur	11	0
	Oleksandr Melashchenko	13.12.1978	Dynamo Kyiv	5	0

Notes:

- (*) Asterisk next to player's name indicates number of matches he played as the team's captain, green color highlights the player who most often served as the team's captain.
- In **bold** are players who played in previous cycles.

== UEFA Euro 2004 ==
=== Qualifying ===
==== Group 6 ====
Pos	Team	Pld	W	D	L	GF	GA	GD	Pts	Qualification	(Greece)	(Spain)	(Ukraine)	(Armenia)	(Northern Ireland)
1	Greece	8	6	0	2	8	4	+4	**18**	Qualify for final tournament	—	0–2	**1–0**	2–0	1–0
2	Spain	8	5	2	1	16	4	+12	**17**	Advance to play-offs	0–1	—	**2–1**	3–0	3–0
**3**	Ukraine	**8**	**2**	**4**	**2**	**11**	**10**	**+1**	**10**		**2–0**	**2–2**	—	**4–3**	**0–0**
4	Armenia	8	2	1	5	7	16	−9	**7**		0–1	0–4	**2–2**	—	1–0
5	Northern Ireland	8	0	3	5	0	8	−8	**3**		0–2	0–0	**0–0**	0–1	—

Source: UEFA

=== Team roster ===
- Head coach: Leonid Buryak 2-4-2/11-10

#	Name	Birth date	Club(s)	Games	Goals
Goalkeepers
	**Oleksandr Shovkovskyi**	2.01.1975	Dynamo Kyiv	4	(-5)
	**Vitaliy Reva**	19.11.1974	Dynamo Kyiv	3	(-2)
	**Dmytro Shutkov**	3.04.1972	Shakhtar Donetsk	1	(-3)
Defenders
	Oleh Luzhnyi******	5.08.1968	(England) Arsenal → (England) Wolverhampton Wanderers	6	0
	**Andriy Nesmachnyi**	28.02.1979	Dynamo Kyiv	6	0
	**Serhiy Fedorov**	18.02.1975	Dynamo Kyiv	5	1
	**Serhiy Popov**	22.04.1971	Shakhtar Donetsk	3	0
	Oleksandr Radchenko	19.07.1976	Dynamo Kyiv → Dnipro Dnipropetrovsk	3	0
	**Hennadiy Moroz**	27.03.1975	Dnipro Dnipropetrovsk	2	0
	**Mykhaylo Starostyak**	13.10.1973	Shakhtar Donetsk	2	0
	**Yuriy Dmytrulin**	10.02.1975	Dynamo Kyiv	2	0
	**Volodymyr Yezerskiy**	15.11.1976	Dnipro Dnipropetrovsk	1	0
	**Oleksandr Holovko**	6.01.1972	Dynamo Kyiv	1	0
	Vitaliy Lysytskyi	16.04.1982	Dynamo Kyiv	1	0
	Vyacheslav Shevchuk	13.05.1979	(Russia) Shinnik Yaroslavl	1	0
	Serhiy Matyukhin	21.03.1980	Dnipro Dnipropetrovsk	0	0
Midfielders
	**Anatoliy Tymoshchuk**	30.03.1979	Shakhtar Donetsk	7	0
	**Andriy Husin**	11.12.1972	Dynamo Kyiv	6	0
	**Hennadiy Zubov**	12.09.1977	Shakhtar Donetsk	5	1
	Maksym Kalynychenko	26.01.1979	(Russia) Spartak Moscow	5	0
	**Oleksandr Horshkov**	29.04.1975	(Russia) Saturn Ramenskoye	4	2
	**Serhiy Serebrennikov**	1.09.1976	(Belgium) Club Brugge	4	1
	**Sergei Kormiltsev**	22.01.1974	(Russia) Torpedo Moscow	4	0
	Serhiy Zakarlyuka	17.08.1976	Metalurh Donetsk	2	0
	Oleh Husiev	25.04.1983	Dynamo Kyiv	2	0
	**Oleksandr Spivak**	29.04.1975	(Russia) Zenit Saint Petersburg	1	0
	**Roman Maksymyuk**	14.06.1974	Dnipro Dnipropetrovsk	1	0
	Adrian Pukanych	22.06.1983	Shakhtar Donetsk	1	0
	**Serhiy Konovalov**	1.03.1972	Arsenal Kyiv	0	0
	Oleksiy Hai	6.11.1982	Shakhtar Donetsk	0	0
	Serhiy Snytko	31.03.1975	(Russia) Chernomorets Novorossiysk	0	0
Forwards
	**Andriy Vorobey**	18.11.1972	Shakhtar Donetsk	8	1
	Andriy Voronin	21.07.1979	(Germany) Mainz 05 → (Germany) Köln	7	2
	**Serhiy Rebrov**	3.06.1974	(England) Tottenham Hotspur → (Turkey) Fenerbahçe	5	0
	Andriy Shevchenko**	29.09.1976	(Italy) Milan	4	3
	**Oleksandr Melashchenko**	13.12.1978	Dynamo Kyiv	2	0
	Oleh Venhlinskyi	21.03.1978	Dnipro Dnipropetrovsk	1	0

Notes:

- (*) Asterisk next to player's name indicates number of matches he played as the team's captain, green color highlights the player who most often served as the team's captain.
- In **bold** are players who played in previous cycles.

== 2006 FIFA World Cup ==
=== Qualifying ===
==== Group 2 ====
Pos	Team	Pld	W	D	L	GF	GA	GD	Pts	Qualification	Ukraine national football team	Turkey national football team	Denmark national football team	Greece national football team	Albania national football team	Georgia national football team	Kazakhstan national football team
**1**	Ukraine	**12**	**7**	**4**	**1**	**18**	**7**	**+11**	25	**Qualification to 2006 FIFA World Cup**	—	**0–1**	**1–0**	**1–1**	**2–2**	**2–0**	**2–0**
2	Turkey	12	6	5	1	23	9	+14	23	Advance to second round	**0–3**	—	2–2	0–0	2–0	1–1	4–0
3	Denmark	12	6	4	2	24	12	+12	22		**1–1**	1–1	—	1–0	3–1	6–1	3–0
4	Greece	12	6	3	3	15	9	+6	21		**0–1**	0–0	2–1	—	2–0	1–0	3–1
5	Albania	12	4	1	7	11	20	−9	13		**0–2**	0–1	0–2	2–1	—	3–2	2–1
6	Georgia	12	2	4	6	14	25	−11	10		**1–1**	2–5	2–2	1–3	2–0	—	0–0
7	Kazakhstan	12	0	1	11	6	29	−23	1		**1–2**	0–6	1–2	1–2	0–1	1–2	—

Rules for classification: Tiebreakers

=== Team roster ===
- Head coach: Oleh Blokhin 7-4-1/18-7 (2-1-2/5-7)

#	Name	Birth date	Club(s)	Qualification		Tournament	
#	Name	Birth date	Club(s)	Games	Goals	Games	Goals
Goalkeepers
	Oleksandr Shovkovskyi**	2.01.1975	Dynamo Kyiv	12	(-7)	5	(-7)
	**Vitaliy Reva**	19.11.1974	Dynamo Kyiv	0	0	—	
	**Vyacheslav Kernozenko**	4.06.1976	Dnipro Dnipropetrovsk	0	0	—	
	Maksym Startsev	20.01.1980	Kryvbas Kryvyi Rih	0	0	—	
	Andriy Pyatov	28.06.1984	Vorskla Poltava	—		0	0
	Bohdan Shust	4.03.1986	Shakhtar Donetsk	—		0	0
Defenders
	Andriy Rusol	16.01.1983	Dnipro Dnipropetrovsk	12	1	4	1
	**Andriy Nesmachnyi**	28.02.1979	Dynamo Kyiv	11	0	5	0
	**Volodymyr Yezerskiy**	15.11.1976	Dnipro Dnipropetrovsk	10	0	1	0
	**Serhiy Fedorov**	18.02.1975	Dynamo Kyiv	8	0	—	
	**Oleksandr Radchenko**	19.07.1976	Dnipro Dnipropetrovsk	3	0	—	
	**Mykhaylo Starostyak**	13.10.1973	Shakhtar Donetsk	2	0	—	
	**Serhiy Matyukhin**	21.03.1980	Dnipro Dnipropetrovsk	2	0	—	
	**Yuriy Dmytrulin**	10.02.1975	Dynamo Kyiv	1	0	—	
	**Vladyslav Vashchuk**	2.01.1975	Dynamo Kyiv	1	0	3	0
	**Vyacheslav Shevchuk**	13.05.1979	Shakhtar Donetsk	1	0	—	
	Vyacheslav Checher	15.12.1980	Metalurh Donetsk	1	0	—	
	Vyacheslav Sviderskyi	1.01.1979	(Russia) Saturn Ramenskoye → Arsenal Kyiv	1	0	3	0
	Oleksandr Yatsenko	24.02.1985	Kharkiv	—		0	0
	Dmytro Chyhrynskyi	7.11.1986	Shakhtar Donetsk	—		0	0
Midfielders
	**Andriy Husin**	11.12.1972	Dynamo Kyiv → (Russia) Krylia Sovetov Samara	11	3	5	0
	**Oleh Husiev**	25.04.1983	Dynamo Kyiv	11	1	5	0
	**Anatoliy Tymoshchuk***	30.03.1979	Shakhtar Donetsk	11	0	5	0
	Oleh Shelayev	5.11.1976	Dnipro Dnipropetrovsk	9	0	5	0
	Ruslan Rotan	29.10.1981	Dnipro Dnipropetrovsk → Dynamo Kyiv	7	3	3	0
	**Serhiy Zakarlyuka**	17.08.1976	Illichivets Mariupol	4	0	—	
	Serhiy Nazarenko	16.02.1980	Dnipro Dnipropetrovsk	3	0	0	0
	Oleksandr Rykun	6.05.1978	Dnipro Dnipropetrovsk	2	0	—	
	Serhiy Shyshchenko	13.01.1976	Metalurh Donetsk	2	0	—	
	Ruslan Bidnenko	20.07.1981	Dynamo Kyiv → Dnipro Dnipropetrovsk	0	0	—	
	**Maksym Kalynychenko**	26.01.1979	(Russia) Spartak Moscow	—		4	1
Forwards
	**Andriy Voronin**	21.07.1979	(Germany) Bayer Leverkusen	11	1	4	0
	Andriy Shevchenko**************	29.09.1976	(Italy) Milan → (England) Chelsea	9	6	5	2
	**Andriy Vorobey**	18.11.1972	Shakhtar Donetsk	9	0	4	0
	Oleksiy Byelik	21.03.1978	Shakhtar Donetsk	8	2	1	0
	**Serhiy Rebrov**	3.06.1974	Dynamo Kyiv	1	0	4	1
	**Oleh Venhlinskyi**	21.03.1978	(Greece) AEK Athens	1	0	—	
	Oleksandr Kosyrin	18.06.1977	Chornomorets Odesa	1	0	—	
	Artem Milevskyi	12.01.1985	Dynamo Kyiv	—		4	0

Notes:

- (*) Asterisk next to player's name indicates number of matches he played as the team's captain, green color highlights the player who most often served as the team's captain.
- In **bold** are players who played in previous cycles.
- Serhiy Fedorov was injured prior to the start of the tournament. His replacement, Vyacheslav Shevchuk, was also injured shortly after filling in. Oleksandr Yatsenko was then called up.

=== Finals tournament ===
==== Group H ====
Pos	Team	Pld	W	D	L	GF	GA	GD	Pts	Qualification	ESP	UKR	TUN	KSA
1	Spain	3	3	0	0	8	1	+7	**9**	**Advance to knockout stage**	—			
**2**	Ukraine	**3**	**2**	**0**	**1**	**5**	**4**	**+1**	**6**	**Advance to knockout stage**		—		
3	Tunisia	3	0	1	2	3	6	−3	**1**				—	
4	Saudi Arabia	3	0	1	2	2	7	−5	**1**					—

Source: FIFA
Rules for classification: Tie-breaking criteria

==== Knockout stage ====
26 June 2006
21:00

Switzerland	0–0 (a.e.t.)	Ukraine
	Report
Penalties
Streller (penalty missed); Barnetta (penalty missed); Cabanas (penalty missed)	0–3	(penalty missed) Shevchenko; (penalty scored) Milevskyi; (penalty scored) Rebrov; (penalty scored) Husiev

RheinEnergieStadion, Cologne
Attendance: 45,000
Referee: Benito Archundia (Mexico)
30 June 2006
21:00

Italy	3–0	Ukraine
Zambrotta 6'; Toni 59', 69'	Report

Volksparkstadion, Hamburg
Attendance: 50,000
Referee: Frank De Bleeckere (Belgium)

== UEFA Euro 2008 ==
=== Qualifying ===
==== Group B ====
Pos	Team	Pld	W	D	L	GF	GA	GD	Pts	Qualification	(Italy)	(France)	(Scotland)	(Ukraine)	(Lithuania)	(Georgia (country))	(Faroe Islands)
1	Italy	12	9	2	1	22	9	+13	29	Qualify for final tournament	—	0–0	2–0	**2–0**	1–1	2–0	3–1
2	France	12	8	2	2	25	5	+20	26	Qualify for final tournament	3–1	—	0–1	**2–0**	2–0	1–0	5–0
3	Scotland	12	8	0	4	21	12	+9	24		1–2	1–0	—	**3–1**	3–1	2–1	6–0
**4**	Ukraine	**12**	**5**	**2**	**5**	**18**	**16**	**+2**	17		**1–2**	**2–2**	**2–0**	—	**1–0**	**3–2**	**5–0**
5	Lithuania	12	5	1	6	11	13	−2	16		0–2	0–1	1–2	**2–0**	—	1–0	2–1
6	Georgia	12	3	1	8	16	19	−3	10		1–3	0–3	2–0	**1–1**	0–2	—	3–1
7	Faroe Islands	12	0	0	12	4	43	−39	0		1–2	0–6	0–2	**0–2**	0–1	0–6	—

Source: UEFA

=== Team roster ===
- Head coach: Oleh Blokhin 5-2-5/18-16

#	Name	Birth date	Club(s)	Games	Goals
Goalkeepers
	Oleksandr Shovkovskyi***	2.01.1975	Dynamo Kyiv	10	(-13)
	**Andriy Pyatov**	28.06.1984	Vorskla Poltava → Shakhtar Donetsk	3	(-3)
	**Vyacheslav Kernozenko**	4.06.1976	Dnipro Dnipropetrovsk	0	0
	**Bohdan Shust**	4.03.1986	Shakhtar Donetsk	0	0
	**Maksym Startsev**	20.01.1980	Dnipro Dnipropetrovsk	0	0
Defenders
	**Volodymyr Yezerskiy**	15.11.1976	Dnipro Dnipropetrovsk → Shakhtar Donetsk	10	1
	**Andriy Rusol**	16.01.1983	Dnipro Dnipropetrovsk	9	1
	**Andriy Nesmachnyi**	28.02.1979	Dynamo Kyiv	8	0
	**Dmytro Chyhrynskyi**	7.11.1986	Shakhtar Donetsk	6	0
	Oleksandr Kucher	22.10.1982	Shakhtar Donetsk	5	1
	**Vladyslav Vashchuk**	2.01.1975	Dynamo Kyiv	2	0
	Bohdan Shershun	14.05.1981	Dnipro Dnipropetrovsk	2	0
	**Vyacheslav Sviderskyi**	1.01.1979	Shakhtar Donetsk → Arsenal Kyiv → Chornomorets Odesa	1	0
	**Serhiy Fedorov**	18.02.1975	Dynamo Kyiv	1	0
	Oleksandr Romanchuk	21.10.1984	Arsenal Kyiv	1	0
Midfielders
	**Oleh Husiev**	25.04.1983	Dynamo Kyiv	12	4
	**Anatoliy Tymoshchuk***	30.03.1979	(Russia) Zenit Saint Petersburg	12	0
	**Oleh Shelayev**	5.11.1976	Dnipro Dnipropetrovsk	10	1
	**Maksym Kalynychenko**	26.01.1979	(Russia) Spartak Moscow	8	2
	**Serhiy Nazarenko**	16.02.1980	Dnipro Dnipropetrovsk	7	0
	**Ruslan Rotan**	29.10.1981	Dynamo Kyiv	6	1
	**Oleksiy Hai**	6.11.1982	Shakhtar Donetsk	6	0
	Taras Mykhalyk	28.10.1983	Dynamo Kyiv	3	0
	Oleksandr Hrytsay	30.09.1977	Dnipro Dnipropetrovsk	2	0
	**Andriy Husin**	11.12.1972	(Russia) Krylia Sovetov Samara	1	0
	Serhiy Tkachenko	10.02.1979	Shakhtar Donetsk	1	0
	Yevhen Levchenko	2.01.1978	(Netherlands) Groningen	1	0
	**Oleksandr Rykun**	6.05.1978	Metalist Kharkiv	0	0
	Serhiy Kravchenko	24.09.1986	Dnipro Dnipropetrovsk	0	0
Forwards
	**Andriy Voronin**	21.07.1979	(Germany) Bayer Leverkusen → (England) Liverpool	12	1
	**Andriy Vorobey**	18.11.1972	Shakhtar Donetsk → Dnipro Dnipropetrovsk	8	1
	Andriy Shevchenko********	29.09.1976	(England) Chelsea	8	5
	**Artem Milevskyi**	12.01.1985	Dynamo Kyiv	6	0
	Oleksandr Hladkyi	24.08.1987	Shakhtar Donetsk	4	0
	**Serhiy Rebrov**	3.06.1974	Dynamo Kyiv	1	0
	**Oleksiy Byelik**	21.03.1978	Shakhtar Donetsk	1	0

Notes:

- (*) Asterisk next to player's name indicates number of matches he played as the team's captain, green color highlights the player who most often served as the team's captain.
- In **bold** are players who played in previous cycles.

== 2010 FIFA World Cup ==
=== Qualifying ===
==== Group 6 ====
Pos	Team	Pld	W	D	L	GF	GA	GD	Pts	Qualification	(England)	(Ukraine)	(Croatia)	(Belarus)	(Kazakhstan)	(Andorra)
1	England	10	9	0	1	34	6	+28	27	Qualification to 2010 FIFA World Cup	—	**2–1**	5–1	3–0	5–1	6–0
**2**	Ukraine	**10**	**6**	**3**	**1**	**21**	**6**	**+15**	21	**Advance to second round**	**1–0**	—	**0–0**	**1–0**	**2–1**	**5–0**
3	Croatia	10	6	2	2	19	13	+6	20		1–4	**2–2**	—	1–0	3–0	4–0
4	Belarus	10	4	1	5	19	14	+5	13		1–3	**0–0**	1–3	—	4–0	5–1
5	Kazakhstan	10	2	0	8	11	29	−18	6		0–4	**1–3**	1–2	1–5	—	3–0
6	Andorra	10	0	0	10	3	39	−36	0		0–2	**0–6**	0–2	1–3	1–3	—

=== Second round ===
Team 1	Agg.	Team 2	1st leg	2nd leg
**Greece**	1–0	Ukraine	0–0	1–0

=== Team roster ===
- Head coach: Oleksiy Mykhailychenko 6-4-2/21-7

#	Name	Birth date	Club(s)	Games	Goals
Goalkeepers
	**Andriy Pyatov**	28.06.1984	Shakhtar Donetsk	11	(-6)
	Stanislav Bohush	25.10.1983	Dynamo Kyiv	1	(-1)
	**Oleksandr Shovkovskyi**	2.01.1975	Dynamo Kyiv	0	0
Defenders
	**Oleksandr Kucher**	22.10.1982	Shakhtar Donetsk	8	0
	**Vyacheslav Shevchuk**	13.05.1979	Shakhtar Donetsk	6	0
	**Dmytro Chyhrynskyi**	7.11.1986	Shakhtar Donetsk → (Spain) Barcelona	6	0
	Vasyl Kobin	24.05.1985	Shakhtar Donetsk	6	0
	Yaroslav Rakitskyi	3.08.1989	Shakhtar Donetsk	4	1
	Hryhoriy Yarmash	4.01.1985	Vorskla Poltava	4	0
	Vitaliy Mandzyuk	24.01.1986	Arsenal Kyiv → Dynamo Kyiv	4	0
	Yevhen Khacheridi	28.07.1987	Dynamo Kyiv	4	0
	**Andriy Rusol**	16.01.1983	Dnipro Dnipropetrovsk	3	0
	Mykola Ishchenko	9.03.1983	Shakhtar Donetsk	0	0
Midfielders
	Anatoliy Tymoshchuk***	30.03.1979	(Russia) Zenit Saint Petersburg → (Germany) Bayern Munich	11	0
	**Serhiy Nazarenko**	16.02.1980	Dnipro Dnipropetrovsk	9	5
	**Oleksiy Hai**	6.11.1982	Shakhtar Donetsk	7	1
	**Taras Mykhalyk**	28.10.1983	Dynamo Kyiv	7	0
	Oleksandr Aliyev	2.01.1978	Dynamo Kyiv	7	0
	Andriy Yarmolenko	23.10.1989	Dynamo Kyiv	6	2
	**Oleh Husiev**	25.04.1983	Dynamo Kyiv	6	1
	**Maksym Kalynychenko**	26.01.1979	Dnipro Dnipropetrovsk	4	0
	**Ruslan Rotan**	29.10.1981	Dnipro Dnipropetrovsk	4	0
	**Serhiy Kravchenko**	24.09.1986	Vorskla Poltava	3	0
	**Yevhen Levchenko**	2.01.1978	(Netherlands) Groningen	2	0
	Denys Holaydo	3.06.1984	Tavriya Simferopol	1	0
	Valentyn Slyusar	15.09.1977	Metalist Kharkiv	1	0
	Serhiy Valyayev	16.09.1978	Metalist Kharkiv	1	0
Forwards
	Andriy Shevchenko*********	29.09.1976	(Italy) Milan → Dynamo Kyiv	11	6
	**Artem Milevskyi**	12.01.1985	Dynamo Kyiv	10	2
	Yevhen Seleznyov	20.07.1985	Shakhtar Donetsk → Dnipro Dnipropetrovsk	7	2
	**Andriy Voronin**	21.07.1979	(Germany) Hertha → (England) Liverpool	6	0
	Volodymyr Homenyuk	19.07.1985	Tavriya Simferopol → Dnipro Dnipropetrovsk	2	0

Notes:

- (*) Asterisk next to player's name indicates number of matches he played as the team's captain, green color highlights the player who most often served as the team's captain.
- In **bold** are players who played in previous cycles.

== UEFA Euro 2012 ==
=== Finals tournament ===
==== Group D ====
Pos	Team	Pld	W	D	L	GF	GA	GD	Pts	Qualification
1	England	3	2	1	0	5	3	+2	**7**	Advance to knockout stage
2	France	3	1	1	1	3	3	0	**4**	Advance to knockout stage
**3**	Ukraine (H)	**3**	**1**	**0**	**2**	**2**	**4**	**−2**	**3 (Note: Head-to-head result: Ukraine 2–1 Sweden.)**	
4	Sweden	3	1	0	2	5	5	0	**3**	

Source: UEFA
(H) Hosts

=== Team roster ===
- Head coach: Oleh Blokhin 1-0-2/2-4

#	Name	Birth date	Club(s)	Games	Goals
Goalkeepers
	**Andriy Pyatov**	28.06.1984	Shakhtar Donetsk	3	(-4)
	Maksym Koval	9.12.1992	Dynamo Kyiv	0	0
	Oleksandr Horyainov	29.06.1975	Metalist Kharkiv	0	0
Defenders
	**Yevhen Khacheridi**	28.07.1987	Dynamo Kyiv	3	0
	Yevhen Selin	9.05.1988	Vorskla Poltava	3	0
	**Taras Mykhalyk**	28.10.1983	Dynamo Kyiv	2	0
	**Yaroslav Rakitskyi**	3.08.1989	Shakhtar Donetsk	1	0
	Bohdan Butko	13.01.1991	Illichivets Mariupol	1	0
	**Oleksandr Kucher**	22.10.1982	Shakhtar Donetsk	0	0
	**Vyacheslav Shevchuk**	13.05.1979	Shakhtar Donetsk	0	0
Midfielders
	**Anatoliy Tymoshchuk**	30.03.1979	(Germany) Bayern Munich	3	0
	**Oleh Husiev**	25.04.1983	Dynamo Kyiv	3	0
	**Serhiy Nazarenko**	16.02.1980	Tavriya Simferopol	3	0
	Yevhen Konoplyanka	29.09.1989	Dnipro Dnipropetrovsk	3	0
	**Ruslan Rotan**	29.10.1981	Dnipro Dnipropetrovsk	1	0
	**Oleksandr Aliyev**	2.01.1978	Dynamo Kyiv	1	0
	Denys Harmash	19.04.1990	Dynamo Kyiv	1	0
Forwards
	Andriy Shevchenko***	29.09.1976	Dynamo Kyiv	3	2
	**Artem Milevskyi**	12.01.1985	Dynamo Kyiv	3	0
	**Andriy Yarmolenko**	23.10.1989	Dynamo Kyiv	3	0
	Marko Devich	27.10.1983	Metalist Kharkiv	3	0
	**Andriy Voronin**	21.07.1979	(Russia) Dynamo Moscow	2	0
	**Yevhen Seleznyov**	20.07.1985	Shakhtar Donetsk	0	0

Notes:

- (*) Asterisk next to player's name indicates number of matches he played as the team's captain, green color highlights the player who most often served as the team's captain.
- In **bold** are players who played in previous cycles.

== 2014 FIFA World Cup ==
=== Qualification tournament ===
==== Group H ====
Pos	Team	Pld	W	D	L	GF	GA	GD	Pts	Qualification	England national football team	Ukraine national football team	Montenegro national football team	Poland national football team	Moldova national football team	San Marino national football team
1	England	10	6	4	0	31	4	+27	22	Qualification to 2014 FIFA World Cup	—	**1–1**	4–1	2–0	4–0	5–0
**2**	Ukraine	**10**	**6**	**3**	**1**	**28**	**4**	**+24**	21	**Advance to second round**	**0–0**	—	**0–1**	**1–0**	**2–1**	**9–0**
3	Montenegro	10	4	3	3	18	17	+1	15		1–1	**0–4**	—	2–2	2–5	3–0
4	Poland	10	3	4	3	18	12	+6	13		1–1	**1–3**	1–1	—	2–0	5–0
5	Moldova	10	3	2	5	12	17	−5	11		0–5	**0–0**	0–1	1–1	—	3–0
6	San Marino	10	0	0	10	1	54	−53	0		0–8	**0–8**	0–6	1–5	0–2	—

==== Second round ====
Team 1	Agg.	Team 2	1st leg	2nd leg
Ukraine	2–3	**France**	2–0	0–3

=== Team roster ===
- Head coach: Oleh Blokhin 0-1-0/1-1
- Head coach: Andriy Bal 0-1-1/0-1
- Head coach: Mykhailo Fomenko 7-1-1/29-5

#	Name	Birth date	Club(s)	Games	Goals
Goalkeepers
	**Andriy Pyatov**	28.06.1984	Shakhtar Donetsk	12	(-7)
	**Maksym Koval**	9.12.1992	Dynamo Kyiv	0	0
	**Oleksandr Horyainov**	29.06.1975	Metalist Kharkiv	0	0
	Andriy Dykan	16.07.1977	(Russia) Spartak Moscow	0	0
	Oleksandr Bandura	30.05.1986	Metalurh Donetsk	0	0
	Rustam Khudzhamov	5.10.1982	Illichivets Mariupol	0	0
Defenders
	**Yevhen Khacheridi**	28.07.1987	Dynamo Kyiv	9	3
	**Vyacheslav Shevchuk**	13.05.1979	Shakhtar Donetsk	9	0
	Artem Fedetskyi	26.04.1985	Dnipro Dnipropetrovsk	8	2
	**Oleksandr Kucher***	22.10.1982	Shakhtar Donetsk	6	0
	**Yaroslav Rakitskyi**	3.08.1989	Shakhtar Donetsk	5	1
	**Yevhen Selin**	9.05.1988	Vorskla Poltava → Dynamo Kyiv	3	0
	**Vitaliy Mandzyuk**	24.01.1986	Dnipro Dnipropetrovsk	2	1
	**Bohdan Butko**	13.01.1991	Illichivets Mariupol	2	0
	**Taras Mykhalyk**	28.10.1983	Dynamo Kyiv	2	0
Midfielders
	**Andriy Yarmolenko**	23.10.1989	Dynamo Kyiv	12	5
	**Oleh Husiev**	25.04.1983	Dynamo Kyiv	12	1
	**Yevhen Konoplyanka**	29.09.1989	Dnipro Dnipropetrovsk	9	3
	Roman Bezus	26.09.1990	Vorskla Poltava → Dynamo Kyiv	9	3
	Ruslan Rotan****	29.10.1981	Dnipro Dnipropetrovsk	9	0
	Anatoliy Tymoshchuk*******	30.03.1979	(Germany) Bayern Munich → (Russia) Zenit Saint Petersburg	8	0
	Edmar	16.06.1980	Metalist Kharkiv	6	1
	Taras Stepanenko	8.08.1989	Shakhtar Donetsk	5	0
	**Denys Harmash**	19.04.1990	Dynamo Kyiv	4	1
	**Serhiy Nazarenko**	16.02.1980	Tavriya Simferopol	2	0
	Dmytro Khomchenovskyi	16.04.1990	Zorya Luhansk	2	0
	Mykola Morozyuk	17.01.1988	Metalurh Donetsk	2	0
	**Serhiy Kravchenko**	24.09.1986	Dnipro Dnipropetrovsk	1	0
	Dmytro Hrechyshkin	22.09.1991	Shakhtar Donetsk	1	0
	**Oleksiy Hai**	6.11.1982	Chornomorets Odesa	0	0
	Denys Oliynyk	16.06.1987	Dnipro Dnipropetrovsk	0	0
	Denys Dedechko	2.07.1987	Vorskla Poltava	0	0
	Valeriy Fedorchuk	5.10.1988	Karpaty Lviv	0	0
	Serhiy Sydorchuk	2.05.1991	Dynamo Kyiv	0	0
Forwards
	Roman Zozulya	17.11.1989	Dnipro Dnipropetrovsk	10	2
	**Yevhen Seleznyov**	20.07.1985	Dnipro Dnipropetrovsk	8	3
	**Marko Devich**	27.10.1983	Shakhtar Donetsk → Metalist Kharkiv	6	4
	**Artem Milevskyi**	12.01.1985	Dynamo Kyiv	1	0
	Oleksandr Kovpak	2.02.1983	FC Sevastopol	1	0
	**Volodymyr Homenyuk**	19.07.1985	Arsenal Kyiv	0	0

Notes:

- (*) Asterisk next to player's name indicates number of matches he played as the team's captain, green color highlights the player who most often served as the team's captain.
- In **bold** are players who played in previous cycles.

== UEFA Euro 2016 ==
=== Qualification tournament ===
==== Group C ====
Pos	Team	Pld	W	D	L	GF	GA	GD	Pts	Qualification	(Spain)	(Slovakia)	(Ukraine)	(Belarus)	(Luxembourg)	(North Macedonia)
1	Spain	10	9	0	1	23	3	+20	27	Qualify for final tournament	—	2–0	**1–0**	3–0	4–0	5–1
2	Slovakia	10	7	1	2	17	8	+9	22	Qualify for final tournament	2–1	—	**0–0**	0–1	3–0	2–1
**3**	Ukraine	**10**	**6**	**1**	**3**	**14**	**4**	**+10**	19	**Advance to play-offs**	**0–1**	**0–1**	—	**3–1**	**3–0**	**1–0**
4	Belarus	10	3	2	5	8	14	−6	11		0–1	1–3	**0–2**	—	2–0	0–0
5	Luxembourg	10	1	1	8	6	27	−21	4 (Note: Tied on head-to-head points (3) and head-to-head goal difference (0). Head-to-head away goals: Luxembourg 2, Macedonia 0.)		0–4	2–4	**0–3**	1–1	—	1–0
6	Macedonia	10	1	1	8	6	18	−12	4		0–1	0–2	**0–2**	1–2	3–2	—

Source: UEFA

==== Play-offs ====
Team 1	Agg.	Team 2	1st leg	2nd leg
**Ukraine**	3–1	Slovenia	2–0	1–1

=== Team roster ===
- Head coach: Mykhailo Fomenko 7-2-3/17-5 (0-0-3/0-5)

#	Name	Birth date	Club(s)	Qualification		Tournament	
#	Name	Birth date	Club(s)	Games	Goals	Games	Goals
Goalkeepers
	**Andriy Pyatov**	28.06.1984	Shakhtar Donetsk	12	(-5)	3	(-5)
	**Rustam Khudzhamov**	5.10.1982	Shakhtar Donetsk	0	0	—	
	Denys Boyko	29.01.1988	Dnipro Dnipropetrovsk → (Turkey) Beşiktaş	0	0	0	0
	Mykyta Shevchenko	26.01.1993	Zorya Luhansk	0	0	0	0
	Dmytro Bezotosnyi	15.11.1983	Chornomorets Odesa	0	0	—	
	Oleksandr Rybka	10.04.1987	Dynamo Kyiv	0	0	—	
Defenders
	Vyacheslav Shevchuk**	13.05.1979	Shakhtar Donetsk	12	0	2	0
	**Artem Fedetskyi**	26.04.1985	Dnipro Dnipropetrovsk	11	0	3	0
	**Yevhen Khacheridi**	28.07.1987	Dynamo Kyiv	10	0	3	0
	**Yaroslav Rakitskyi**	3.08.1989	Shakhtar Donetsk	9	0	2	0
	**Oleksandr Kucher***	22.10.1982	Shakhtar Donetsk	6	0	1	0
	**Bohdan Butko**	13.01.1991	Shakhtar Donetsk → (Russia) Amkar Perm	—		1	0
	Ivan Ordets	8.07.1992	Shakhtar Donetsk	0	0	—	
	Yevheniy Makarenko	21.05.1991	Dynamo Kyiv	0	0	—	
	Vitaliy Vernydub	17.10.1987	Zorya Luhansk	0	0	—	
	Andriy Pylyavskyi	4.12.1988	Zorya Luhansk	0	0	—	
	Mykyta Burda	24.03.1995	Dynamo Kyiv	0	0	—	
	Mykyta Kamenyuka	3.06.1985	Zorya Luhansk	0	0	—	
Midfielders
	**Andriy Yarmolenko**	23.10.1989	Dynamo Kyiv	12	6	3	0
	Yevhen Konoplyanka**	29.09.1989	Dnipro Dnipropetrovsk → (Spain) Sevilla	11	2	3	0
	**Taras Stepanenko**	8.08.1989	Shakhtar Donetsk	9	0	3	0
	Ruslan Rotan********	29.10.1981	Dnipro Dnipropetrovsk	8	0	1	0
	**Serhiy Sydorchuk**	2.05.1991	Dynamo Kyiv	7	2	2	0
	**Denys Harmash**	19.04.1990	Dynamo Kyiv	6	1	1	0
	**Serhiy Rybalka**	1.04.1990	Dynamo Kyiv	6	0	0	0
	Anatoliy Tymoshchuk**	30.03.1979	(Russia) Zenit Saint Petersburg → (Kazakhstan) Kairat	5	0	1	0
	**Edmar**	16.06.1980	Metalist Kharkiv	3	0	—	
	**Mykola Morozyuk**	17.01.1988	Metalurh Donetsk	2	0	—	
	**Oleh Husiev**	25.04.1983	Dynamo Kyiv	2	0	—	
	Oleksandr Karavayev	2.06.1992	Zorya Luhansk	2	0	0	0
	Kyrylo Kovalchuk	11.06.1986	Chornomorets Odesa	2	0	—	
	Ruslan Malinovskyi	4.05.1993	Zorya Luhansk	2	0	—	
	**Roman Bezus**	26.09.1990	Dynamo Kyiv	1	0	—	
	**Denys Oliynyk**	16.06.1987	(Netherlands) Vitesse Arnhem	1	0	—	
	Oleksandr Zinchenko	15.12.1996	(Russia) Ufa	1	0	3	0
	**Dmytro Khomchenovskyi**	16.04.1990	Zorya Luhansk	0	0	—	
	Viktor Kovalenko	14.02.1996	Shakhtar Donetsk	0	0	3	0
	Pavlo Rebenok	23.07.1985	Metalist Kharkiv	0	0	—	
	Maksym Malyshev	24.12.1992	Shakhtar Donetsk	0	0	—	
	Ivan Petryak	13.03.1994	Zorya Luhansk	0	0	—	
Forwards
	Artem Kravets	3.06.1989	Dynamo Kyiv	8	3	—	
	**Roman Zozulya**	17.11.1989	Dnipro Dnipropetrovsk	5	0	3	0
	**Yevhen Seleznyov**	20.07.1985	Dnipro Dnipropetrovsk → Shakhtar Donetsk	5	2	2	0
	Pylyp Budkivskyi	10.03.1992	Zorya Luhansk	4	0	0	0
	**Oleksandr Hladkyi**	24.08.1987	Shakhtar Donetsk	2	0	—	
	Artem Hromov	14.01.1990	Vorskla Poltava	1	0	—	
	**Volodymyr Homenyuk**	19.07.1985	Metalist Kharkiv	0	0	—	

Notes:

- (*) Asterisk next to player's name indicates number of matches he played as the team's captain, green color highlights the player who most often served as the team's captain.
- In **bold** are players who played in previous cycles.

=== Final tournament ===
==== Group C ====
Pos	Team	Pld	W	D	L	GF	GA	GD	Pts	Qualification
1	Germany	3	2	1	0	3	0	+3	**7 (Note: Tied on head-to-head result (Germany 0–0 Poland). Overall goal difference was used as the tiebreaker.)**	Advance to knockout stage
2	Poland	3	2	1	0	2	0	+2	**7**	Advance to knockout stage
3	Northern Ireland	3	1	0	2	2	2	0	**3**	Advance to knockout stage
**4**	Ukraine	**3**	**0**	**0**	**3**	**0**	**5**	**−5**	**0**	

Source: UEFA
