= List of international goals scored by Andriy Shevchenko =

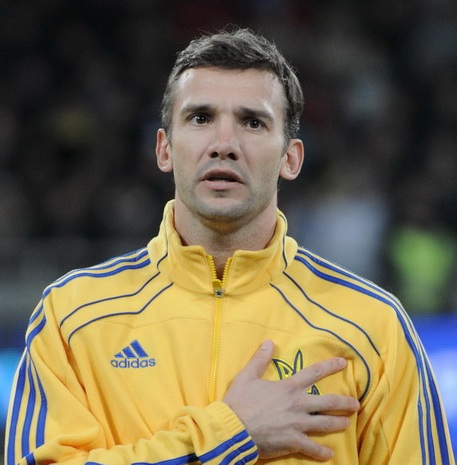
Andriy Shevchenko with Ukraine in 2011

Andriy Shevchenko is a Ukrainian former professional footballer who represented the Ukraine national football team as a striker for 17 years from 1995 to 2012. He is the Ukraine national team's all-time top goalscorer with 48 goals in 111 appearances, and the third most-capped Ukrainian international. He has represented the nation in two international tournaments, the 2006 FIFA World Cup and the 2012 UEFA European Championship, and participated in each of his country's qualifying campaigns during his international career.

He made his debut for his country in a 4–0 loss to Croatia in a UEFA Euro 1996 qualifying match in March 1995. He did not score his first goal until May 1996, however, when he scored in a friendly against Turkey. On 9 October 1999, during a crucial UEFA Euro 2000 qualifying match against Russia in Moscow, Shevchenko scored his seventh international goal to level the game at 1–1, securing Ukraine a place in the qualifying play-offs. In the first leg of the play-off against Slovenia, Shevchenko scored the first goal of the game in a 2–1 loss. However, in the second leg, the two teams drew 1–1, meaning that Ukraine lost 3–2 on aggregate. During the UEFA section of the 2002 FIFA World Cup qualifiers, Shevchenko scored nine goals in the qualifying group and captained the side to a second-place finish behind Poland, which set them in a play-off tie against Germany where he scored in the second leg of a 5–2 aggregate defeat. During 2006 FIFA World Cup qualification, Ukraine topped their qualifying group, automatically qualifying for the main competition in Germany and their first World Cup in history as an independent nation. In the group stage, he scored one goal against Saudi Arabia in a 4–0 victory and another goal against Tunisia in a 1–0 victory, as Ukraine finished second in the group stage behind Spain. Shevchenko captained the side to a penalty shoot-out victory against Switzerland in the Round of 16, but the team lost to eventual champions Italy in the quarter-finals. He scored his final international goal in the 55th minute of a UEFA Euro 2012 group stage match against Sweden, which ended as a 2–1 victory for Ukraine. He decided to retire from international football after the final match in the group stage against England; it ended with a 1–0 loss for Ukraine.

== International goals ==
Scores and results list Ukraine's goal tally first; score column indicates score after each Shevchenko goal.

List of international goals scored by Andriy Shevchenko
No.	Date	Venue	Opponent	Score	Result	Competition	Ref.
1	1 May 1996	19 Mayıs Stadium, Samsun, Turkey	Turkey	1–1	2–3	Friendly	
2	2 April 1997	NSC Olympiyskiy, Kyiv, Ukraine	Northern Ireland	2–1	2–1	1998 FIFA World Cup qualification	
3	7 May 1997	NSC Olympiyskiy, Kyiv, Ukraine	Armenia	1–0	1–1	1998 FIFA World Cup qualification	
4	11 October 1997	Hrazdan Stadium, Yerevan, Armenia	Armenia	1–0	2–0	1998 FIFA World Cup qualification	
5	15 November 1997	NSC Olympiyskiy, Kyiv, Ukraine	Croatia	1–0	1–1	1998 FIFA World Cup qualification – UEFA second round	
6	15 July 1998	NSC Olympiyskiy, Kyiv, Ukraine	Poland	1–2	1–2	Friendly	
7	9 October 1999	Luzhniki Stadium, Moscow, Russia	Russia	1–1	1–1	UEFA Euro 2000 qualifying	
8	13 November 1999	Bežigrad Stadium, Ljubljana, Slovenia	Slovenia	1–0	1–2	UEFA Euro 2000 qualifying play-offs	
9	26 April 2000	Georgi Asparuhov Stadium, Sofia, Bulgaria	Bulgaria	1–0	1–0	Friendly	
10	2 September 2000	NSC Olympiyskiy, Kyiv, Ukraine	Poland	1–1	1–3	2002 FIFA World Cup qualification	
11	7 October 2000	Republican Stadium, Yerevan, Armenia	Armenia	1–2	3–2	2002 FIFA World Cup qualification	
12	7 October 2000	Republican Stadium, Yerevan, Armenia	Armenia	3–2	3–2	2002 FIFA World Cup qualification	
13	11 October 2000	Ullevaal Stadion, Oslo, Norway	Norway	1–0	1–0	2002 FIFA World Cup qualification	
14	28 March 2001	Millennium Stadium, Cardiff, Wales	Wales	1–1	1–1	2002 FIFA World Cup qualification	
15	1 September 2001	Dynama Stadium, Minsk, Belarus	Belarus	1–0	2–0	2002 FIFA World Cup qualification	
16	1 September 2001	Dynama Stadium, Minsk, Belarus	Belarus	2–0	2–0	2002 FIFA World Cup qualification	
17	5 September 2001	Ukraina Stadium, Lviv, Ukraine	Armenia	1–0	3–0	2002 FIFA World Cup qualification	
18	6 October 2001	Silesian Stadium, Chorzów, Poland	Poland	1–1	1–1	2002 FIFA World Cup qualification	
19	14 November 2001	Westfalenstadion, Dortmund, Germany	Germany	1–4	1–4	2002 FIFA World Cup qualification (UEFA play-off)	
20	7 June 2003	Ukraina Stadium, Lviv, Ukraine	Armenia	2–2	4–3	UEFA Euro 2004 qualifying	
21	7 June 2003	Ukraina Stadium, Lviv, Ukraine	Armenia	3–2	4–3	UEFA Euro 2004 qualifying	
22	10 September 2003	Martínez Valero, Elche, Spain	Spain	1–2	1–2	UEFA Euro 2004 qualifying	
23	9 October 2004	NSC Olympiyskiy, Kyiv, Ukraine	Greece	1–0	1–1	2006 FIFA World Cup qualification	
24	13 October 2004	Ukraina Stadium, Lviv, Ukraine	Georgia	2–0	2–0	2006 FIFA World Cup qualification	
25	17 November 2004	Şükrü Saracoğlu Stadium, Istanbul, Turkey	Turkey	2–0	3–0	2006 FIFA World Cup qualification	
26	17 November 2004	Şükrü Saracoğlu Stadium, Istanbul, Turkey	Turkey	3–0	3–0	2006 FIFA World Cup qualification	
27	4 June 2005	NSC Olympiyskiy, Kyiv, Ukraine	Kazakhstan	1–0	2–0	2006 FIFA World Cup qualification	
28	8 October 2005	Stadium Meteor, Dnipropetrovsk, Ukraine	Albania	1–0	2–2	2006 FIFA World Cup qualification	
29	8 June 2006	Stade Josy Barthel, Luxembourg, Luxembourg	Luxembourg	3–0	3–0	Friendly	
30	19 June 2006	AOL Arena, Hamburg, Germany	Saudi Arabia	3–0	4–0	2006 FIFA World Cup	
31	23 June 2006	Olympiastadion, Berlin, Germany	Tunisia	1–0	1–0	2006 FIFA World Cup	
32	6 September 2006	NSC Olympiyskiy, Kyiv, Ukraine	Georgia	1–0	3–2	UEFA Euro 2008 qualifying	
33	11 October 2006	NSC Olympiyskiy, Kyiv, Ukraine	Scotland	2–0	2–0	UEFA Euro 2008 qualifying	
34	12 September 2007	NSC Olympiyskiy, Kyiv, Ukraine	Italy	1–1	1–2	UEFA Euro 2008 qualifying	
35	13 October 2007	Hampden Park, Glasgow, Scotland	Scotland	1–2	1–3	UEFA Euro 2008 qualifying	
36	21 November 2007	NSC Olympiyskiy, Kyiv, Ukraine	France	2–2	2–2	UEFA Euro 2008 qualifying	
37	26 March 2008	Lobanovsky Dynamo Stadium, Kyiv, Ukraine	Serbia	1–0	2–0	Friendly	
38	6 September 2008	Ukraina Stadium, Lviv, Ukraine	Belarus	1–0	1–0	2010 FIFA World Cup qualification	
39	10 September 2008	Almaty Central Stadium, Almaty, Kazakhstan	Kazakhstan	2–0	3–1	2010 FIFA World Cup qualification	
40	1 April 2009	Wembley Stadium, London, England	England	1–1	1–2	2010 FIFA World Cup qualification	
41	6 June 2009	Stadion Maksimir, Zagreb, Croatia	Croatia	1–1	2–2	2010 FIFA World Cup qualification	
42	5 September 2009	Lobanovsky Dynamo Stadium, Kyiv, Ukraine	Andorra	3–0	5–0	2010 FIFA World Cup qualification	
43	14 October 2009	Estadi Comunal, Andorra la Vella, Andorra	Andorra	1–0	6–0	2010 FIFA World Cup qualification	
44	25 May 2010	Metalist Stadium, Kharkiv, Ukraine	Lithuania	3–0	4–0	Friendly	
45	25 May 2010	Metalist Stadium, Kharkiv, Ukraine	Lithuania	4–0	4–0	Friendly	
46	7 October 2011	Lobanovsky Dynamo Stadium, Kyiv, Ukraine	Bulgaria	2–0	3–0	Friendly	
47	11 June 2012	NSC Olympiyskiy, Kyiv, Ukraine	Sweden	1–1	2–1	UEFA Euro 2012	
48	11 June 2012	NSC Olympiyskiy, Kyiv, Ukraine	Sweden	2–1	2–1	UEFA Euro 2012	

== Statistics ==
Goals by year
Year	Caps	Goals
1995	2	0
1996	2	1
1997	8	4
1998	6	1
1999	9	2
2000	5	5
2001	7	6
2002	3	0
2003	8	3
2004	6	4
2005	6	2
2006	9	5
2007	8	3
2008	7	3
2009	8	4
2010	6	2
2011	5	1
2012	6	2
Total	111	48

Goals by competition
Competition	Goals
FIFA World Cup qualifiers	26
UEFA European Championship qualifiers	10
Friendlies	8
FIFA World Cup	2
UEFA European Championship	2
Total	48

Goals by Opponent
Opponent	Goals
Armenia	4
Turkey	3
Andorra	2
Poland	2
Scotland	2
Croatia	1
England	1
France	1
Georgia	1
Germany	1
Greece	1
Italy	1
Kazakhstan	1
Lithuania	1
Luxembourg	1
Northern Ireland	1
Saudi Arabia	1
Serbia	1
Spain	1
Sweden	1
Tunisia	1
Wales	1

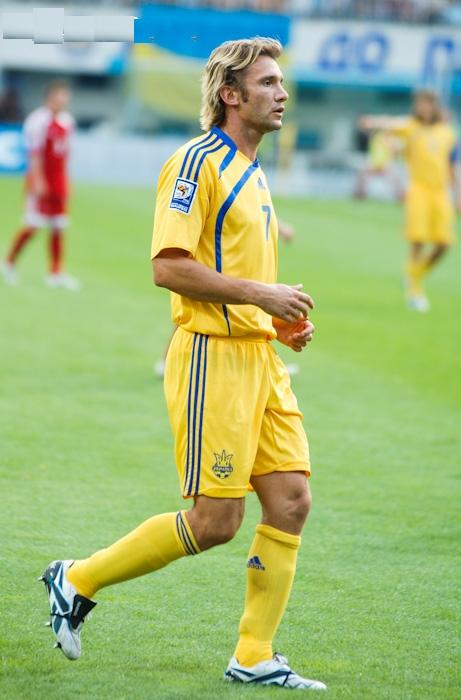
Shevchenko during a 2010 World Cup qualifier

== See also ==
- List of top international men's football goal scorers by country
