= List of Ukraine national football team captains =

This is a list of all the players who have captained the Ukraine national football team.

Yuriy Shelepnytskyi was the first captain of the Ukraine national football team.

Andriy Shevchenko wore the captain band the most times: 58.

Andriy Yarmolenko is the current captain of the national team.

== List of captains ==
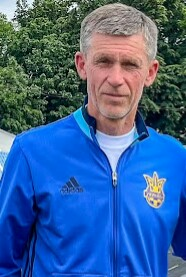
Yuriy Shelepnytskyi was the first captain in the history of the national team.

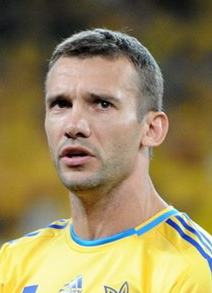
Andriy Shevchenko is a player with the most captaincies in the history of Ukraine with 58 matches.

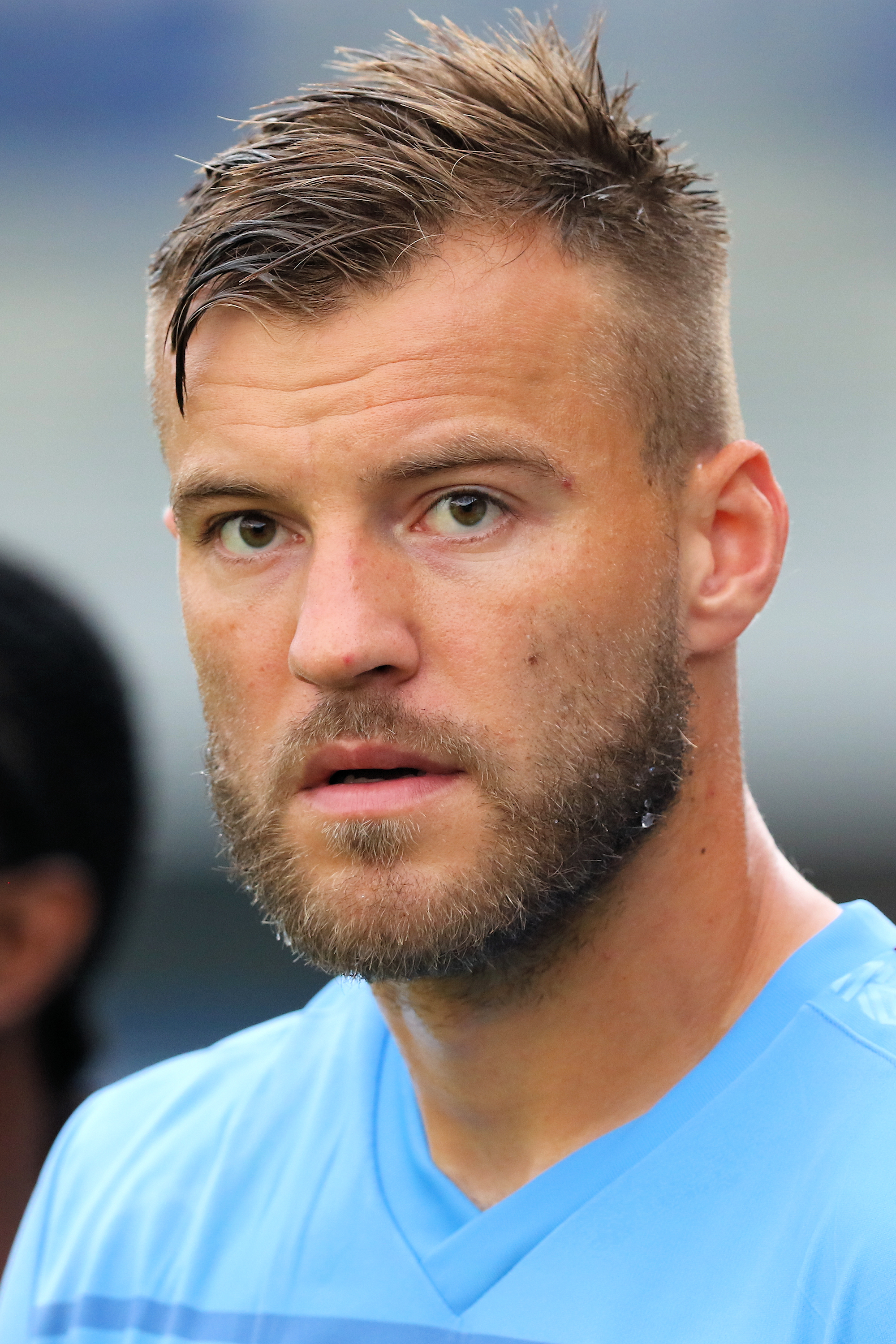
Andriy Yarmolenko is a current captain of the Ukraine national team.

List of captaincy periods of the various captains throughout the years.

As of 2 October 2026, after the game against Northern Ireland

Players in bold are still active. Years in italics indicate last year, when still an active player was a captain.

#	Name	Captain	Appearances	Goals	National years	Captaincy years
1	Andriy Shevchenko	58	111	48	1995–2012	2002–2012
2	Anatoliy Tymoshchuk (Note: On 11 March 2022, UAF annulled Tymoshchuk's caps and goals for the national team due to his refusal to speak out against the 2022 Russian invasion of Ukraine.)	41	144	4	2000–2016	2004–2015
3	Oleh Luzhnyi	39	52	0	1992–2003	1994–2003
4	**Andriy Yarmolenko**	31	127	47	2009–2026	2018–2026
5	Ruslan Rotan	24	100	8	2003–2018	2012–2017
5	Andriy Pyatov	24	102	0	2007–2022	2017–2022
7	**Mykola Matviyenko**	16	86	0	2017–2026	2024–2026
8	Yuriy Kalitvintsev	13	22	1	1995–1999	1996–1999
8	Oleksandr Holovko	13	58	0	1995–2004	1998–2004
10	Oleksandr Shovkovskyi	12	92	0	1994–2012	2005–2011
11	Oleksandr Kucher	8	57	2	2006–2017	2013–2017
12	Taras Stepanenko	7	87	4	2010–2024	2021–2024
13	**Oleksandr Zinchenko**	6	75	12	2015–2025	2021–2024
14	Yevhen Konoplyanka	5	87	21	2010–2023	2015–2018
15	Serhiy Bezhenar	4	23	1	1992–1997	1993–1997
15	Yuriy Maksymov	4	27	5	1992–2002	1995–1997
15	Vyacheslav Shevchuk	4	56	0	2003–2016	2016
15	**Illya Zabarnyi**	4	60	3	2020–2026	2025–2026
19	Ihor Kutepov	3	4	0	1992–1993	1993
19	Serhiy Diryavka	3	9	0	1992–1995	1993–1994
19	Andriy Husin	3	71	9	1993–2006	2003–2006
22	Andriy Rusol	2	49	3	2004–2010	2008
22	Serhiy Sydorchuk	2	62	3	2013–2024	2022
22	Vladyslav Vashchuk	2	63	1	1996–2007	2001–2002
25	Yuriy Shelepnytskyi	1	1	0	1992	1992
25	Serhiy Tretyak	1	2	0	1992	1992
25	Yevhen Drahunov	1	2	0	1992	1992
25	Oleksiy Mykhaylychenko	1	2	0	1992–1994	1992
25	Ihor Petrov	1	3	0	1994	1994
25	Hennadiy Lytovchenko	1	4	0	1993–1994	1994
25	**Oleksandr Zubkov**	1	47	3	2020–2026	2026
25	Artem Fedetskyi	1	53	2	2010–2016	2016
25	Serhiy Rebrov	1	75	15	1992–2006	2002
Total	33 players	337			1992–2026	1992–2026
