= UEFA Euro 2004 qualifying Group 6 =

Football tournament qualifying stage

Standings and results for Group 6 of the UEFA Euro 2004 qualifying tournament.

Group 6 consisted of Armenia, Greece, Northern Ireland, Spain and Ukraine. Group winners were Greece, who unexpectedly finished one point clear of second-placed team Spain who qualified for the play-offs.

== Standings ==
Pos	Team	Pld	W	D	L	GF	GA	GD	Pts	Qualification	(Greece)	(Spain)	(Ukraine)	(Armenia)	(Northern Ireland)
1	Greece	8	6	0	2	8	4	+4	18	Qualify for final tournament	—	0–2	1–0	2–0	1–0
2	Spain	8	5	2	1	16	4	+12	17	Advance to play-offs	0–1	—	2–1	3–0	3–0
3	Ukraine	8	2	4	2	11	10	+1	10		2–0	2–2	—	4–3	0–0
4	Armenia	8	2	1	5	7	16	−9	7		0–1	0–4	2–2	—	1–0
5	Northern Ireland	8	0	3	5	0	8	−8	3		0–2	0–0	0–0	0–1	—

Source: UEFA
Rules for classification: Qualification tiebreakers

== Matches ==
7 September 2002
19:00 UTC+5

Armenia	2–2	Ukraine
Petrosyan 73'; Sarkisyan 90' (pen.)	Report	Serebrennikov 2'; Zubov 33'

Hanrapetakan Stadium, Yerevan
Attendance: 12,500
Referee: Mikko Vuorela (Finland)
7 September 2002
21:45 UTC+3

Greece	0–2	Spain
	Report	Raúl 8'; Valerón 77'

Leoforos Alexandras Stadium, Athens
Attendance: 14,206
Referee: Markus Merk (Germany)

12 October 2002
19:00 UTC+3

Ukraine	2–0	Greece
Vorobey 51'; Voronin 90'	Report

Olimpiysky National Sports Complex, Kyiv
Attendance: 40,000
Referee: René Temmink (Netherlands)
12 October 2002
21:45 UTC+2

Spain	3–0	Northern Ireland
Baraja 19', 89'; Guti 59'	Report

Carlos Belmonte, Albacete
Attendance: 15,150
Referee: Lubos Michel (Slovakia)

16 October 2002
20:00 UTC+3

Greece	2–0	Armenia
Nikolaidis 2', 59'	Report

Leoforos Alexandras Stadium, Athens
Attendance: 8,000
Referee: Darko Čeferin (Slovenia)
16 October 2002
20:00 UTC+1

Northern Ireland	0–0	Ukraine
	Report

Windsor Park, Belfast
Attendance: 9,288
Referee: Cosimo Bolognino (Italy)

29 March 2003
18:00 UTC+4

Armenia	1–0	Northern Ireland
Petrosyan 86'	Report

Hanrapetakan Stadium, Yerevan
Attendance: 10,321
Referee: Roland Beck (Liechtenstein)
29 March 2003
20:00 UTC+2

Ukraine	2–2	Spain
Voronin 11'; Horshkov 90'	Report	Raúl 83'; Etxeberria 87'

Olimpiysky National Sports Complex, Kyiv
Attendance: 83,400
Referee: Mike Riley (England)

2 April 2003
20:00 UTC+1

Northern Ireland	0–2	Greece
	Report	Charisteas 4', 55'

Windsor Park, Belfast
Attendance: 7,187
Referee: Grzegorz Gilewski (Poland)
2 April 2003
21:45 UTC+2

Spain	3–0	Armenia
Tristán 60'; Helguera 69'; Joaquín 90'	Report

Nuevo Estadio Antonio Amilivia, León
Attendance: 13,500
Referee: Alon Yefet (Israel)

7 June 2003
19:00 UTC+3

Ukraine	4–3	Armenia
Gorshkov 28'; Shevchenko 65' (pen.), 73'; Fedorov 90'	Report	Sarkisyan 15' (pen.), 52'; Petrosyan 74'

Ukraina Stadium, Lviv
Attendance: 23,600
Referee: Hermann Albrecht (Germany)
7 June 2003
21:45 UTC+2

Spain	0–1	Greece
	Report	Giannakopoulos 42'

La Romareda, Zaragoza
Attendance: 29,500
Referee: Alain Sars (France)

11 June 2003
21:00 UTC+3

Greece	1–0	Ukraine
Charisteas 86'	Report

Leoforos Alexandras Stadium, Athens
Attendance: 14,314
Referee: Frank De Bleeckere (Belgium)
11 June 2003
20:00 UTC+1

Northern Ireland	0–0	Spain
	Report

Windsor Park, Belfast
Attendance: 11,365
Referee: Claus Bo Larsen (Denmark)

6 September 2003
21:00 UTC+5

Armenia	0–1	Greece
	Report	Vryzas 36'

Hanrapetakan Stadium, Yerevan
Attendance: 6,500
Referee: René Temmink (Netherlands)
6 September 2003
19:15 UTC+3

Ukraine	0–0	Northern Ireland
	Report

Shakhtar Stadium, Donetsk
Attendance: 25,700
Referee: Wolfgang Stark (Germany)

10 September 2003
20:00 UTC+1

Northern Ireland	0–1	Armenia
	Report	Karamyan 27'

Windsor Park, Belfast
Attendance: 8,616
Referee: Anton Stredak (Slovakia)
10 September 2003
21:45 UTC+2

Spain	2–1	Ukraine
Raúl 59', 71'	Report	Shevchenko 84'

Martínez Valero, Elche
Attendance: 33,847
Referee: Terje Hauge (Norway)

11 October 2003
21:00 UTC+5

Armenia	0–4	Spain
	Report	Valerón 7'; Raúl 76'; Reyes 87', 90'

Hanrapetakan Stadium, Yerevan
Attendance: 15,000
Referee: Urs Meier (Switzerland)
11 October 2003
19:00 UTC+3

Greece	1–0	Northern Ireland
Tsiartas 69' (pen.)	Report

Leoforos Alexandras Stadium, Athens
Attendance: 14,585
Referee: Lucílio Batista (Portugal)

== Goalscorers ==
There were 42 goals scored in 20 matches, for an average of 2.1 goals per match.

5 goals

- (Spain national football team) Raúl

3 goals

- (Armenia national football team) Artur Petrosyan
- (Armenia national football team) Albert Sarkisyan
- (Greece national football team) Angelos Charisteas
- (Ukraine national football team) Andriy Shevchenko

2 goals

- (Greece national football team) Demis Nikolaidis
- (Spain national football team) Rubén Baraja
- (Spain national football team) José Antonio Reyes
- (Spain national football team) Juan Carlos Valerón
- (Ukraine national football team) Oleksandr Horshkov
- (Ukraine national football team) Andriy Voronin

1 goal

- (Armenia national football team) Arman Karamyan
- (Greece national football team) Stelios Giannakopoulos
- (Greece national football team) Vasilios Tsiartas
- (Greece national football team) Zisis Vryzas
- (Spain national football team) Joseba Etxeberria
- (Spain national football team) Guti
- (Spain national football team) Iván Helguera
- (Spain national football team) Joaquín
- (Spain national football team) Diego Tristán
- (Ukraine national football team) Serhiy Fedorov
- (Ukraine national football team) Serhiy Serebrennikov
- (Ukraine national football team) Andriy Vorobey
- (Ukraine national football team) Hennadiy Zubov
