= Yaroslav Vatamanyuk =

Soviet footballer and Ukrainian coach

Personal information
- Full name: Yaroslav Petrovych Vatamanyuk
- Date of birth: 25 May 1963 (age 63)
- Place of birth: Verbytsia, Lviv Oblast, Ukrainian SSR
- Height: 1.79 m (5 ft 10 in)
- Position: Defender

Senior career*
Years	Team	Apps	(Gls)
1981–1982	Nyva Pidhaitsi		
1983–1984	Zirka Yavoriv		
1985–2000	Prykarpattya Ivano-Frankivsk	516	(2)
1999–2000	→ Prykarpattia-2 Ivano-Frankivsk	12	(0)

International career
1992	Ukraine	1	(0)

Managerial career
- 2000–?: FC Prykarpattya Ivano-Frankivsk
- FC Chornohora Ivano-Frankivsk
- FC Enerhetyk Burshtyn
- 2004–2005: FC Sokil Berezhany
- FC Fakel Ivano-Frankivsk
- 2007–present: FSC Prykarpattya Ivano-Frankivsk
- * Club domestic league appearances and goals

Yaroslav Vatamanyuk (Ukrainian: Ярослав Петрович Ватаманюк; born 25 May 1963) is a retired Soviet football player and current Ukrainian coach. He is a record holder of the FC Spartak Ivano-Frankivsk – 530 played matches for club, including 516 league games.
