= Oleksandr Yatsenko =

Ukrainian footballer

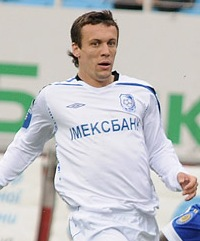

Personal information
- Full name: Oleksandr Ivanovych Yatsenko
- Date of birth: 24 February 1985 (age 41)
- Place of birth: Kyiv, Ukrainian SSR, USSR
- Height: 1.80 m (5 ft 11 in)
- Position: Defender

Youth career
- 1998–2002: Dynamo Kyiv

Senior career*
Years	Team	Apps	(Gls)
2001–2007	Dynamo Kyiv	10	(0)
2001–2002	→ Dynamo-3 Kyiv	9	(0)
2002–2005	→ Dynamo-2 Kyiv	73	(4)
2005–2006	→ Kharkiv (loan)	37	(1)
2007	→ Dnipro Dnipropetrovsk (loan)	0	(0)
2007–2009	Chornomorets Odesa	36	(0)
2010–2011	Illichivets Mariupol	27	(1)
2012	Belshina Bobruisk	28	(1)
2013	Helios Kharkiv	19	(0)
Total		239	(7)

International career
2002	Ukraine U17	1	(0)
2005	Ukraine U20	4	(0)
2003–2006	Ukraine U21	33	(4)
2005	Ukraine	1	(0)

Managerial career
- 2014–2017: Helios Kharkiv (youth academy)
Medal record
Men's football
Representing Ukraine
UEFA European Under-19 Championship
Bronze medal – third place	2004 Switzerland
UEFA European Under-21 Championship
Runner-up	2006 Portugal
- * Club domestic league appearances and goals

Oleksandr Ivanovych Yatsenko (Ukrainian: Олександр Іванович Яценко; born 24 February 1985) is a Ukrainian former football player. He currently works at Helios Kharkiv youth academy. He played as a defender.

== Club career ==
Yatsenko is a product of the Dynamo Kyiv youth system, and has featured 10 times for their senior team. He went on loan twice; first to Kharkiv in 2005, and in 2007 to Dnipro Dnipropetrovsk for the spring half of the 2006–07 season. In July 2007 he signed a three-year contract with FC Chornomorets Odesa.

== International career ==
He has represented Ukraine at all levels. He was a semi-finalist at the 2004 UEFA European Under-19 Football Championship, and played in the 2005 FIFA World Youth Championship. He captained his team to a silver medal at the 2006 UEFA European Under-21 Football Championship. Yatsenko was called up to the 2006 FIFA World Cup Ukraine squad as a replacement for the injured players Serhiy Fedorov and Vyacheslav Shevchuk.

He currently has one cap for the senior Ukraine national football team, in a 1–0 friendly win over Japan on 12 October 2005.

Yatsenko was awarded the Order For Courage by President Viktor Yushchenko for his participation in the 2006 FIFA World Cup finals in Germany.

== See also ==
- 2005 FIFA World Youth Championship squads#Ukraine

== Honours ==
Ukraine under-21

- UEFA Under-21 Championship: runner-up 2006
