= Oleksandr Horshkov =

Ukrainian association football coach and former midfielder

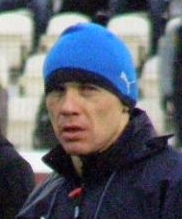

Personal information
- Full name: Oleksandr Viktorovych Horshkov
- Date of birth: 8 February 1970 (age 56)
- Place of birth: Kirovsk, Ukrainian SSR
- Height: 1.80 m (5 ft 11 in)
- Position: Central midfielder

Senior career*
Years	Team	Apps	(Gls)
1987–1988	Stakhanovets Stakhanov		
1989	SKA Tashkent	28	(1)
1990–1991	SKA Kyiv	76	(3)
1992–1994	Nyva Vinnytsia	72	(6)
1994–1995	Chornomorets Odesa	33	(0)
1996–1997	Zhemchuzhina Sochi	36	(5)
1997–2001	Zenit St. Petersburg	115	(20)
2002–2003	Saturn-REN-TV Moscow Oblast	46	(4)
2004–2008	Zenit St. Petersburg	77	(3)
Total		383	(42)

International career
1998	Russia	2	(0)
2003	Ukraine	4	(2)

Managerial career
- 2009–2010: Zenit U-21 (assistant)
- 2010: Zenit U-17
- 2011: FC Baltika Kaliningrad
- 2011–2012: Zenit U-17
- 2012: FC Nizhny Novgorod
- 2012: FC Rus Saint Petersburg
- 2013: FC Amkar Perm (assistant)
- 2014: FC Saturn Ramenskoye
- 2017–2018: Zenit U-21
- 2018: Zenit-2
- 2020–2021: Daugavpils
- 2021: FC Kolomyagi St. Petersburg
- 2021: FC Irtysh Omsk
- 2021–2022: FC Yadro Saint Petersburg
- * Club domestic league appearances and goals

Oleksandr Viktorovych Horshkov (Ukrainian: Олександр Вікторович Горшков, also rendered as Aleksandr Gorshkov, Russian: Александр Викторович Горшков; born 8 February 1970) is a Ukrainian association football coach and former midfielder.

== Career ==
=== International career ===
He played for Ukraine in UEFA Euro 2004 qualifying. Before representing Ukraine, he played twice for Russia in friendlies.

==== International goals ====
Scores and results list Ukraine's goal tally first.

No	Date	Venue	Opponent	Score	Result	Competition
1.	29 March 2003	Olimpiyskiy National Sports Complex, Kyiv, Ukraine	Spain	2–2	2–2	Euro 2004 qualifier
2.	7 June 2003	Ukraina Stadium, Lviv, Ukraine	Armenia	1–1	4–3	Euro 2004 qualifier

== Coaching career ==
After his retirement he became a coach for the Zenit youth team. He managed FC Saturn Ramenskoye.

== Honours ==
As a player

- 1999 – Russian Cup
- 2001 – Russian Premier League bronze.
- 2007 Russian Premier League
- 2008 Russian Super Cup
- 2008 UEFA cup
- 2008 UEFA Super Cup

As a coach

- 2009 – Russian Youth Team Championship (as assistant coach)

== Personal ==
Oleksandr is married and has 2 children.
