= Serhiy Tretyak =

Ukrainian footballer (born 1963)

Serhiy Tretyak Сергій Трет`як
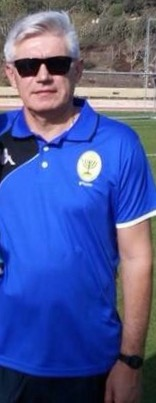

Personal information
- Full name: Serhiy Volodymyrovych Tretyak
- Date of birth: 7 September 1963 (age 63)
- Place of birth: Kherson, Ukrainian SSR
- Height: 1.82 m (5 ft 11 1/2 in)
- Position: Sweeper

Senior career*
Years	Team	Apps	(Gls)
1981	Krystal Kherson	42	(7)
1982–1983	SKA Odessa	37	(1)
1984–1992	Chornomorets Odesa	183	(6)
1992–2000	Beitar Jerusalem	239	(3)
2000–2001	Hakoah Ramat Gan		

International career
1992	Ukraine	2	(0)

Managerial career
- 2003–2013: Beitar Jerusalem (youth team)
- 2006–2009: Beitar Jerusalem (assistant manager)
- * Club domestic league appearances and goals

Serhiy Volodymyrovych Tretyak (Ukrainian: Сергій Володимирович Трет`як; Russian: Серге́й Владимирович Третьяк; born 7 September 1963) is a retired Ukrainian professional footballer. Tretyak made his professional debut in the Soviet First League in 1982 for SKA Odessa. In 1992 Tretyak moved to Israel, accepting a 6-year contract from Beitar Jerusalem. He retired in 2001 and then worked for more than ten years as the manager of Beitar's youth team, he also worked as the assistant manager in the senior team from 2006 to 2009.

In 1983 Tretyak took part in the Summer Spartakiad of the Peoples of the USSR in the team of Ukrainian SSR.

== Honours ==
Chornomorets Odesa

- USSR Federation Cup: 1990

Beitar Jerusalem

- Israeli Premier League: 1992–93, 1996–97, 1997–98
- Toto Cup: 1997–98
