= Serhiy Serebrennikov =

Footballer (born 1976)

Personal information
- Full name: Serhiy Olekandrovych Serebrennikov
- Date of birth: 1 September 1976 (age 50)
- Place of birth: Ulan-Ude, Soviet Union
- Height: 1.86 m (6 ft 1 in)
- Position: Midfielder

Senior career*
Years	Team	Apps	(Gls)
1992–1995	Shinnik Yaroslavl		
1995–1996	Vympel Rybinsk	8	(1)
1996–1998	Dynamo Vologda	50	(10)
1998–1999	Shinnik Yaroslavl	30	(8)
1999–2002	Dynamo Kyiv	30	(8)
1999–2002	→ Dynamo-2 Kyiv	64	(21)
1999–2001	→ Dynamo-3 Kyiv	5	(2)
2002–2007	Club Brugge	29	(1)
2005–2006	→ Charleroi SC (loan)	12	(1)
2006–2007	→ Cercle Brugge	16	(1)
2007–2011	Cercle Brugge	137	(11)
2011–2014	SV Roeselare	57	(0)

International career
2001–2006	Ukraine	12	(1)

Managerial career
- 2011–2014: Roeselare (player-coach)
- * Club domestic league appearances and goals

Serhiy Serebrennikov (Ukrainian: Сергій Серебренніков, Russian: Сергей Серебренников; born 1 September 1976) is a former professional footballer who played as a central midfielder. Born in Russia, he made 12 appearances for the Ukraine, scoring once. From June 2011 till 2014 he was player-coach for Belgian club Roeselare.

== Club career ==
=== In Russia and Ukraine ===
At the age of 16, Serebrennikov moved from Ulan-Ude, in the east of Siberia, to Moscow where he would go to a sports school for five years. During this period, he played for football teams as Shinnik Yaroslavl, Vympel Rybinsk and Dynamo Vologda.

=== In Belgium ===
In 2002, Serebrennikov was transferred to Belgian First division side Club Brugge. Due to injuries, he has only played 46 times for Club between 2002 and 2006.

In the 2005-2006 season, Serebrennikov was loaned for a half season to Charleroi SC. One season later, he was loaned for the whole season to Cercle Brugge, breaking his fibula during training in the first week of his loan.

Serebrennikov signed a 4-year deal with Cercle Brugge, starting with the 2007-2008 season. He signed his contract while he was playing on loan with Cercle.

On 30 June 2011, it was announced that Serebrennikov would be loaned out for the 2011–12 season to become player-manager at SV Roeselare (his first job as a coach).

== International career ==
In 1999, when Serebrennikov was 22, he took on the Ukrainian citizenship, after his move to Dynamo Kyiv. He played his first international game in a friendly game on 15 August 2001 against Latvia away. He played 12 times for Ukraine, scoring once.

== Career statistics ==
=== Club ===
Appearances and goals by club, season and competition
Season	Club	League			Cup		Europe		Other		Total	
Season	Club	Division	Apps	Goals	Apps	Goals	Apps	Goals	Apps	Goals	Apps	Goals
Vympel Rybinsk	1995	Third League	8	1			–		–		8	1
Dynamo Vologda	1996	Second League	23	3			–		–		23	3
Dynamo Vologda	1997	Second League	27	7			–		–		27	7
Shinnik Yaroslavl	1998	Russian Premier League	30	8			–		–		30	8
Dynamo Kyiv	1998–99	Ukrainian Premier League	9	6	2	0	–		–		11	6
Dynamo Kyiv	1999–2000	Ukrainian Premier League	5	1	–		–		–		5	1
Dynamo Kyiv	2000–01	Ukrainian Premier League	7	0	1	0	–		–		8	0
Dynamo Kyiv	2001–02	Ukrainian Premier League	9	1	3	0	–		–		12	1
Club Brugge	2002–03	Belgian First Division	16	1			–		–		16	1
Club Brugge	2003–04	Belgian First Division	6	0			–		–		6	0
Club Brugge	2004–05	Belgian First Division	5	0			–		–		5	0
Club Brugge	2005–06	Belgian First Division	2	0	–		–		–		2	0
Charleroi	2005–06	Belgian First Division	12	1			–		–		12	1
Career total			144	43	18	5	0	0	0	0	162	48

=== International ===
Appearances and goals by national team and year
National team	Year	Apps	Goals
Ukraine	2001	2	0
Ukraine	2002	4	1
Ukraine	2003	5	0
Ukraine	2006	1	0
Total		12	1

Score and result list Ukraine's goal tally first, score column indicates score after Serebrennikov goal.

International goal scored by Serhiy Serebrennikov
No.	Date	Venue	Opponent	Score	Result	Competition
1	7 September 2002	Yerevan, Armenia	Armenia	1–0	2–2	UEFA Euro 2004 qualifying

== Honours ==
Club Brugge

- Belgian First Division A: 2002–03
- Belgian Super Cup: 2002, 2003
