= Serhiy Fedorov =

Ukrainian football player

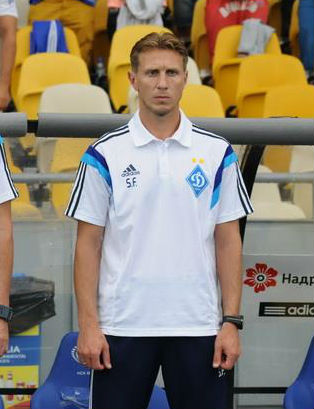
- Fedorov in 2014

Personal information
- Full name: Serhiy Vladyslavovych Fedorov
- Date of birth: 18 February 1975 (age 51)
- Place of birth: Kyiv, Ukrainian SSR
- Height: 1.84 m (6 ft 1/2 in)
- Position: Centre back

Team information
- Current team: Dynamo Kyiv (assistant)

Senior career*
Years	Team	Apps	(Gls)
1992–1995	Dynamo Kyiv	1	(0)
1992–1995	→ Dynamo-2 Kyiv	75	(2)
1993	→ CSK ZSU Kyiv	4	(0)
1995–1996	CSKA Kyiv	39	(3)
1997–2008	Dynamo Kyiv	124	(10)
1997–2002	→ Dynamo-2 Kyiv	114	(13)
1997–2001	→ Dynamo-3 Kyiv	10	(3)
2009	Chornomorets Odesa	1	(0)
2010	Zirka Kirovohrad	0	(0)
Total		165	(13)

International career
1995–1996	Ukraine U21	17	(0)
1999–2007	Ukraine	29	(1)

Managerial career
- 2010: Zirka Kirovohrad (assistant)
- 2013–2017: Dynamo Kyiv (assistant)
- 2017–2019: Dynamo Kyiv U21 (assistant)
- 2019–2020: Dynamo Kyiv (assistant)
- 2020–2021: Dynamo Kyiv U21 (assistant)
- 2021–2023: Dynamo Kyiv U19 (assistant)
- 2023-: Dynamo Kyiv (assistant)
- * Club domestic league appearances and goals

Serhiy Vladyslavovych Fedorov (Ukrainian: Сергій Владиславович Федоров, born 18 February 1975) is a Ukrainian football manager and former player. He started off as a central defender, but mostly plays as a right back, or a right-sided midfielder. He subsequently started a managerial career.

== Career ==
Fedorov came through the youth ranks at Dynamo and his first coaches were Hryhoriy Matiyenko and Anatoliy Kroshchenko. Fedorov made his professional debut in 1992 playing for Dynamo-2 Kyiv in a home game against Halychyna Drohobych. In a spring of 1993 he spend some time playing for CSK ZSU at the third tier. He made his debut for the Dynamo's first team at the top tier on 12 March 1994 playing an away match against Tavriya Simferopol.

Due to limited opportunities, he was given to the UPL newcomer CSKA-Borysfen Kyiv (later CSKA) in 1995, playing for the club for a year and a half, thereby gaining some game time at the top level.

In 1997, Fedorov returned to Dynamo. After his return, it was not until 2001 when he earned a regular spot in the first squad. In 1997–2001, Fedorov more often was featured in matches for Dynamo-2 at the second tier. At international club level, he made his debut at the 1998–99 UEFA Champions League in the away match against Barry Town F.C. on 29 July 1998. During the 2003–04 UEFA Champions League Fedorov scored two goals, one against Dinamo Zagreb and another one against Inter Milan. He also made two Ukrainian Super Cup appearances in 2004 and 2005, with Dynamo winning the inaugural cup in 2004. Fedorov also made appearances in four final matches of the Ukrainian Cup.

He was released as a free agent in 2008, and on 1 April 2009 he joined FC Chornomorets Odesa for the remainder of 2008–09 season.

In contrast to his Dynamo career, he has been a regular for his country, Ukraine in their various qualifying campaigns throughout the 1990s and 2000s, and was set to take part in the 2006 World Cup in Germany. Serhiy suffered an injury prior to the event, and was then replaced by Oleksandr Yatsenko from the U-21 Team.

== Honours ==
- Ukrainian Premier League: 1997–98, 1998–99, 1999–00, 2000–2001, 2006–07
- Ukrainian First League: 1998–99, 1999–00, 2000–2001
- Ukrainian Cup: 1998, 1999, 2000, 2006, 2007
- Ukrainian Super Cup: 2004
