= 1994–95 Ukrainian Cup =

1994–95 Ukrainian Football Cup
Кубок України з футболу

Tournament details
- Country: Ukraine
- Dates: 21 August 1994 – 29 May 1995
- Teams: 107

Final positions
- Champions: Shakhtar Donetsk (1st title)
- Runners-up: Dnipro Dnipropetrovsk

Tournament statistics
- Top goal scorer: Andriy Shevchenko (6)

The 1994–95 Ukrainian Cup was the fourth annual edition of Ukraine's football knockout competition, known as the Ukrainian Cup.

The main event started on September 26, 1994, with the round of 32 and concluded with the final game on May 28. The tournament also had couple of preliminaries that started in summer on August 21. Two clubs withdrew from the competition: Lokomotyv Konotop and Shakhtar Horlivka.

The cup holder Chornomorets Odesa was eliminated on away goal rule by Shakhtar Donetsk in semifinals.

== Team allocation ==
- One hundred seven teams entered the competition.
- 3 regions did not provide their representatives (Chernihiv, Donetsk, Poltava)

=== Distribution ===
	Teams entering in this round	Teams advancing from previous round
1st Qualifying round (54 teams)	23 winners of regional cup competitions; 18 participants of the Third League; 11 participants of the Second League; 2 participants of the First League	
2nd Qualifying round (64 teams)	4 participants of the Third League; 11 participants of the Second League; 20 participants of the First League; 2 participants of the Top League	27 winners from the first qualifying round
3rd Qualifying round (32 teams)		32 winners from the second qualifying round
Tournament proper (32 teams)	16 participants of the Top League	16 winners from the third qualifying round

=== First qualifying round entrants ===
- 23 regional representatives
- 18 Third League (Advis Khmelnytskyi, Avanhard Zhydachiv, Dnistrovets Bilhorod-Dnistrovskyi, Dnister Zalishchiky, Fetrovyk Khust, Keramik Baranivka, Khutrovyk Tysmenytsia, Lada Chernivtsi, LAZ Lviv, Metalurh Novomoskovsk, Nyva Myronivka, Oskil Kupiansk, Shakhtar Horlivka, Sula Lubny, Systema-Boreks Borodianka, Tavria Novotroitsk, Transimpeks Vyshneve, Vahonobudivnyk Kremenchuk)
- 11 Second League (Artania Ochakiv, Azovets Mariupol, Chonomorets-2 Odesa, Druzhba Berdiansk, Dynamo Luhansk, Dynamo Saky, Halychyna Drohobych, Harant Donetsk, Hazovyk Komarne, Sirius Zhovti Vody, Tytan Armiansk)
- 2 First League (Naftokhimik Kremenchuk, Naftovyk Okhtyrka)

=== Second qualifying round entrants ===
- 27 winners of the first qualifying round
- 4 Third League (Avanhard Rovenky, CSKA Kyiv, Torpedo Melitopol, Vahonobudivnyk Stakhanov)
- 11 Second League (Chaika Sevastopol, Desna Chernihiv, FC Lviv, Medita Shakhtarsk, Meliorator Kakhovka, Metalurh Kerch, Ros Bila Tserkva, Shakhtar Pavlohrad, Tavria Kherson, Viktor Zaporizhzhia, Yavir Krasnopillia)
- 20 First League (Bazhanovets Makiivka, Borysfen Boryspil, Bukovyna Chernivtsi, Dnipro Cherkasy, Dynamo-2 Kyiv, Karpaty Mukacheve, Khimik Severodonets, Khimik Zhytomyr, Krystal Chortkiv, Metalist Kharkiv, Metalurh Nikopol, SC Odesa, Nord-Am-Podillia Khmelnytskyi, Polihraftekhnika Oleksandria, SBTS Sumy, Skala Stryi, Stal Alchevsk, Vorskla Poltava, Zakarpattia Uzhhorod, Zirka-NIBAS Kirovohrad)
- 2 Top League (Evis Mykolaiv, Prykarpattia Ivano-Frankivsk)

== Competition schedule ==
=== First Qualifying round ===
All games were played on August 21, 1994. Two scheduled games did not take place due to withdrawals.

Tavria (Novotroitsk)(3L)	7:0	(2L)Artania (Ochakiv)
Nyva (Nechayane)(AM)	0:1	(2L)Chornomorets-2 (Odesa)	aet
Nyva-Viktor (Novomykolayivka)(AM)	1:1	(2L)Sirius (Zhovti Vody)	aet, pk 3:2
Metalurh (Kryvyi Rih)(AM)	1:0	(3L)Oskil (Kupyansk)
Avanhard (Merefa)(AM)	1:0	(3L)Metalurh (Novomoskovsk)	game was played at MSZ Stadium in Merefa
Naftokhimik (Kremenchuk)(1L)	1:0	(1L)Naftovyk (Okhtyrka)
Lokomotyv (Konotop)(AM)	-:+	(3L)Systema-Borex (Borodianka)	Lokomotyv forfeited
Druzhba (Berdiansk)(2L)	0:0	(2L)Azovets (Mariupol)	aet, pk 3:4
Harant (Donetsk)(2L)	2:3	(2L)Dynamo (Luhansk)
Batkivschyna (Pervomaisk)(AM)	+:-	(3L)Shakhtar (Horlivka)	Shakhtar failed to participate
Kharchovyk (Bilozerka)(AM)	0:1	(2L)Tytan (Armyansk)
Chaika (Okhotnykove)(AM)	1:2	(2L)Dynamo (Saky)	aet
Sokil (Velyki Hai)(AM)	0:3	(2L)Hazovyk (Komarno)
Lada (Chernivtsi)(3L)	2:0	(3L)Dnister (Zalischiki)	game was played in Novoselytsya at Kolos Stadium
Pidshypnyk (Lutsk)(AM)	7:1	(AM)Sokil (Zolochiv)
Krystal (Dubno)(AM)	2:4	(3L)Advis (Khmelnytskyi)
Khutrovyk (Tysmenytsia)(3L)	2:0	(3L)Avanhard (Zhydachiv)
Baktyanets (Badalove)(AM)	0:2	(2L)Halychyna (Drohobych)
Karpaty (Chernivtsi)(AM)	0:2	(3L)Fetrovyk (Khust)
Beskyd (Nadvirna)(AM)	1:1	(3L)LAZ (Lviv)	aet, pk 3:1
Khimik-Nyva-2 (Vinnytsia)(AM)	1:0	(3L)Transimpeks (Vyshneve)
Obolon-Zmina (Kyiv)(AM)	3:0	(3L)Sula (Lubny)
Kolos (Karapyshi)(AM)	1:2	(3L)Keramik (Baranivka)
Krok (Zhytomyr)(AM)	6:0	(AM)Enerhetyk (Netishyn)
Pervomayets (Pershotravneve)(AM)	1:4	(3L)Dnistrovets (Bilhorod-Dnistrovskyi)	game played in Odesa at Stroihidravlyka Stadium
Lokomotyv (Znamianka)(AM)	1:0	(3L)Vahanobudivnyk (Kremenchuk)
Lokomotyv (Smila)(AM)	0:2	(3L)Nyva (Myronivka)

=== Second Qualifying round ===
All games were played on September 1, 1994.

Tavria (Novotroitsk)(3L)	0:1	(2L)Viktor (Zaporizhzhia)
Chornomorets-2 (Odesa)(2L)	1:0	(1L)Metalurh (Nikopol)	game was played at SKA Stadium in Odesa
Nyva-Viktor (Novomykolayivka)(AM)	1:0	(1L)Polihraftekhnika (Olexandria)	game was played at Titan Stadium in Zaporizhzhia
Metalurh (Kryvyi Rih)(AM)	1:2	(2L)Yavir (Krasnopilya)	aet, game was played at Oktyabrska Mine Stadium in Kryvyi Rih
Avanhard (Merefa)(AM)	0:3	(1L)Vorskla (Poltava)
Naftokhimik (Kremenchuk)(1L)	4:2	(1L)Metalist (Kharkiv)	game was played at Dnipro Stadium in Kremenchuk
Systema-Borex (Borodianka)(3L)	3:2	(1L)Dnipro (Cherkasy)
Desna (Chernihiv)(2L)	2:1	(1L)SBTS (Sumy)
Azovets (Mariupol)(2L)	1:2	(2L)Medita (Shakhtarsk)
Shakhtar (Pavlohrad)(2L)	0:3	(1L)Bazhanovets (Makiivka)
Avanhard (Rovenky)(3L)	4:1	(3L)Vahonobudivnyk (Stakhanov)
Torpedo (Melitopol)(3L)	1:1	(2L)Meliorator (Kakhovka)	aet, pk 3:4
Dynamo (Luhansk)(2L)	3:3	(1L)Khimik (Severodonetsk)	aet, pk 1:2, game was played at Avanhard Stadium
Batkivschyna (Pervomaisk)(AM)	0:4	(1L)Stal (Alchevsk)
Tytan (Armyansk)(2L)	6:0	(2L)Metalurh (Kerch)
Dynamo (Saky)(2L)	2:0	(2L)Chaika (Sevastopol)
Hazovyk (Komarno)(2L)	3:0	(1L)Karpaty (Mukacheve)
Lada (Chernivtsi)(3L)	0:3	(1L)Krystal (Chortkiv)	game was played at Bukovyna Stadium
Pidshypnyk (Lutsk)(AM)	2:0	(2L)Lviv	aet
Advis (Khmelnytskyi)(3L)	0:0	(1L)Khimik (Zhytomyr)	aet, pk 2:4
Khutrovyk (Tysmenytsia)(3L)	2:1	(1L)Bukovyna (Chernivtsi)
Halychyna (Drohobych)(2L)	0:1	(PL)Prykarpattia (Ivano-Frankivsk)
Fetrovyk (Khust)(3L)	1:0	(1L)Skala (Stryi)
Beskyd (Nadvirna)(AM)	0:1	(1L)Zakarpattia (Uzhhorod)
Khimik-Nyva-2 (Vinnytsia)(AM)	0:3	(3L)CSKA (Kyiv)
Obolon-Zmina (Kyiv)(AM)	1:3	(1L)Borysfen (Boryspil)
Keramik (Baranivka)(3L)	4:2	(2L)Ros (Bila Tserkva)	game was played at Lenin's Komsomol Stadium in Zhytomyr
Krok (Zhytomyr)(AM)	0:4	(1L)Podillya (Khmelnytskyi)
Tavria (Kherson)(2L)	2:6	(1L)Odesa
Dnistrovets (Bilhorod-Dnistrovskyi)(3L)	0:4	(PL)EVIS (Mykolaiv)
Lokomotyv (Znamianka)(AM)	0:4	(1L)Zirka (Kirovohrad)
Nyva (Myronivka)(3L)	1:2	(1L)Dynamo-2 (Kyiv)

=== Third Qualifying round ===
All games were played on September 5, 1994. Notice that there was four days break between two rounds. During this round couple of the Premier League clubs were eliminated, without even making it to the main event.

Viktor (Zaporizhzhia)(2L)	2:0	(2L)Chornomorets-2 (Odesa)
Nyva-Viktor (Novonikolaivka)(AM)	0:0	(2L)Yavir (Krasnopilya)	aet, pk 2:3, game was played at Lokomotyv Stadium in Zaporizhzhia
Vorskla (Poltava)(1L)	1:0	(1L)Naftokhimik (Kremenchuk)
Systema-Borex (Borodianka)(3L)	1:0	(2L)Desna (Chernihiv)
Medita (Shakhtarsk)(2L)	1:1	(1L)Bazhanovets (Makiivka)	aet, pk 5:3, game was played in Yubileiny Stadium in Kirovske
Avanhard (Rovenky)(3L)	4:1	(2L)Meliorator (Kakhovka)
Khimik (Severodonetsk)(1L)	0:1	(1L)Stal (Alchevsk)
Tytan (Armyansk)(2L)	1:1	(2L)Dynamo Saky (Saky)	aet, pk 3:2
Hazovyk (Komarno)(2L)	2:1	(1L)Krystal (Chortkiv)
Pidshybnyk (Lutsk)(AM)	1:3	(1L)Khimik (Zhytomyr)	aet
Khutrovyk (Tysmenytsia)(3L)	2:1	(PL)Prykarpattia (Ivano-Frankivsk)
Fetrovyk (Khust)(3L)	0:1	(1L)Zakarpattia (Uzhhorod)
CSKA (Kyiv)(3L)	1:3	(1L)Borysfen (Boryspil)
Keramik (Baranivka)(3L)	2:1	(1L)Podillya (Khmelnytskyi)	aet
Odesa(1L)	2:0	(PL)EVIS (Mykolaiv)	aet
Zirka-NIBAS (Kirovohrad)(1L)	0:1	(1L)Dynamo-2 (Kyiv)

=== Bracket ===
Round of 32
Viktor Zaporizhzhia	0	1	1
Kryvbas Kryvyi Rih	4	7	11
Yavir Krasnopillya	0	0	0
Nyva Ternopil	0	4	4
Vorskla Poltava	2	1	3
Volyn Lutsk	0	2	2
Systema-Borex	0	1	1
Shakhtar Donetsk	3	2	5
Medita Shakhtarsk	2	0	2
Chornomorets	2	4	6
Avanhard Rovenky	2	0	2
Kremin Kremenchuk	2	5	7
Stal Alchevsk	2	1	3
Zorya-MALS Luhansk	0	1	1
Tytan Armyansk	2	1	3
Nyva Vinnytsia	3	2	5
Hazovyk Komarno	0	0	0
Dynamo Kyiv	2	2	4
Khimik Zhytomyr	2	1	3
Torpedo Zaporizhzhia	0	4	4
Khutrovyk Tysmenytsia	1	1	2
Tavriya Simferopol	1	3	4
Zakarpattia Uzhhorod	2	0	2
Karpaty Lviv	1	3	4
Borysfen Boryspil	1	0	1
Veres Rivne	0	3	3
Keramik Baranivka	1	0	1
Temp Shepetivka	0	2	2
Odesa	1	1	2
Metalurh-Viktor	1	2	3
Dynamo-2 Kyiv	3	1	4
Dnipro	1	4	5

Round of 16
Kryvbas Kryvyi Rih	3	0	3
Nyva Ternopil	0	4	4
Vorskla Poltava	0	0	0
Shakhtar Donetsk	1	8	9
Chornomorets	2	1	3
Kremin Kremenchuk	0	2	2
Stal Alchevsk	1	0	1
Nyva Vinnytsia	0	2	2
Dynamo Kyiv	2	0	2
Torpedo Zaporizhzhia	0	1	1
Tavriya Simferopol	3	1	4
Karpaty Lviv	0	3	3
Veres Rivne	1	0	1
Temp Shepetivka	0	2	2
Metalurh-Viktor	1	0	1
Dnipro	3	1	4

Quarter-finals
Nyva Ternopil	1	0	1
Shakhtar Donetsk	1	2	3
Chornomorets	3	0	3
Nyva Vinnytsia	0	1	1
Dynamo Kyiv	0	1	1
Tavriya Simferopol	1	2	3
Temp Shepetivka	0	0	0
Dnipro	2	1	3

Semi-finals
Shakhtar Donetsk(a)	1	1	2
Chornomorets	0	2	2
Tavriya Simferopol	1	0	1
Dnipro	1	1	2

Final
Shakhtar Donetsk(p)	1
Dnipro Dnipropetrovsk	1

=== Round of 32 ===
Team 1	Agg.	Team 2	1st leg	2nd leg
FC Medita Shakhtarsk	2–6	FC Chornomorets Odesa	2–2	0–4
FC Dynamo-2 Kyiv	4–5	FC Dnipro Dnipropetrovsk	3–1	1–4
FC Zakarpattia Uzhhorod	2–4	FC Karpaty Lviv	2–1	0–3
FC Keramik Baranivka	1–2	FC Temp Shepetivka	1–0	0–2
SC Odesa	2–3	FC Metalurh–Viktor Zaporizhzhia	1–1	1–2
FC Vorskla Poltava	3–2	FC Volyn Lutsk	2–0	1–2
FC Borysfen Boryspil	1–3	FC Veres Rivne	1–0	0–3
FC Systema-Boreks Borodyanka	1–5	FC Shakhtar Donetsk	0–3	1–2
FC Yavir Krasnopillia	0–4	FC Nyva Ternopil	0–0	0–4
FC Viktor Zaporizhzhia	1–11	FC Kryvbas Kryvyi Rih	0–4	1–7
FC Avanhard Rovenky	4–3	FC Kremin Kremenchuk	2–2	0–5
FC Khutrovyk Tysmenytsia	2–4	SC Tavriya Simferopol	1–1	1–3
FC Tytan Armyansk	3–5	FC Nyva Vinnytsia	2–3	1–2
FC Stal Alchevsk	3–1	FC Zorya Luhansk	2–0	1–1
FC Polissya Zhytomyr	3–4	FC Torpedo Zaporizhzhia	2–0	1–4
FC Hazovyk Komarno	0–4	FC Dynamo Kyiv	0–2	0–2

==== First leg ====
26 September 1994
15:30

Medita Shakhtarsk (2L)	2–2	(PL) Chornomorets Odesa
Androshchuk 4'; Honcharov 30' (pen.)	Report	Kulik 75'; Shchekotylin 82'

Stalekanatchyk Stadium, Khartsyzk
Attendance: 3,000
Referee: Oleksandr Kosolapov (Kharkiv)

26 September 1994
17:30

Dynamo-2 Kyiv (1L)	3–1	(PL) Dnipro Dnipropetrovsk
Husin 41'; Shevchenko 52', 75'	Report	Bahmut 51' (pen.)

Dynamo Stadium, Kyiv
Attendance: 1,400
Referee: Roman Zan (Lviv)

27 September 1994
15:00

Zakarpattia Uzhhorod (1L)	2–1	(PL) Karpaty Lviv
Baron 59'; Somyk (penalty missed) 83'; Vasyutyk 90' (pen.)	Report	Makovei 58'

Avanhard Stadium, Uzhhorod
Attendance: 2,500
Referee: Vadym Shevchenko (Kyiv)

27 September 1994
15:00

Keramik Baranivka (3L)	1–0	(PL) Temp Shepetivka
Tsivchyk 36'	Report

Keramik Stadium, Baranivka
Attendance: 3,000
Referee: Ihor Bezuhlyi (Lutsk)

27 September 1994
16:00

SC Odesa (1L)	1–1	(PL) Metalurh Zaporizhzhia
Kolesnichenko (penalty missed) '40; Holovachuk 60'	Report	Bohatyr 70'

SKA Stadium, Odesa
Attendance: 500
Referee: Volodymyr Pianykh (Donetsk)

27 September 1994
15:00

Vorskla Poltava (1L)	2–0	(PL) Volyn Lutsk
Lyashenko 40'; Matviychenko 71'	Report

Vorskla Stadium, Poltava
Attendance: 5,500
Referee: Vadym Shelmenko (Kyiv)

27 September 1994
15:30

Borysfen Boryspil (1L)	1–0	(PL) Veres Rivne
Volosyanko 45'	Report

Kolos Stadium, Boryspil
Attendance: 1,500
Referee: Viktor Derdo (Illichivsk)

27 September 1994
15:30

Systema-Boreks Borodyanka (3L)	0–3	(PL) Shakhtar Donetsk
	Report	Babiy 5'; Voskoboinyk 34'; Stolovytskyi 77'

Systema Stadium, Borodyanka
Attendance: 5,000
Referee: Anatoliy Aranovsky (Kyiv)

27 September 1994
15:30

Yavir Krasnopillya (2L)	0–0	(PL) Nyva Ternopil
	Report

Kolos Stadium, Krasnopillya
Attendance: 4,500
Referee: Oleksandr Kozachenko (Kyiv)

27 September 1994
15:30

Viktor Zaporizhzhia (2L)	0–4	(PL) Kryvbas Kryvyi Rih
	Report	Pantilov 53'; Hromov 60'; Fokin 81'; Honcharenko 85'

Lokomotyv Stadium, Zaporizhzhia
Attendance: 3,000
Referee: Viktor Dohadailo (Kyiv)

27 September 1994
15:30

Avanhard Rovenky (3L)	2–2	(PL) Kremin Kremenchuk
Zainulin 68'; Shylo 79'	Report	Fedkov 38'; Korponai 53'

Avanhard Stadium, Rovenky
Attendance: 4,500
Referee: Ihor Horozhankin (Kirovohrad)

27 September 1994
16:00

Khutrovyk Tysmenytsia (3L)	1–1	(PL) Tavriya Simferopol
Petryk 84' (pen.)	Report	Makhonin 81'

Khutrovyk Stadium, Tysmenytsia
Attendance: 5,000
Referee: Ihor Khiblin (Khmelnytskyi)

27 September 1994
16:30

Tytan Armyansk (2L)	2–3	(PL) Nyva Vinnytsia
Borysenko 5'; Nykyforov 43' (pen.)	Report	Nahornyak 18', 25', 53'

Khimik Stadium, Armyansk
Attendance: 2,500
Referee: Dmytro Martynyuk (Dnipropetrovsk)

27 September 1994
17:00

Stal Alchevsk (1L)	2–0	(PL) Zorya Luhansk
Manko 39'; Chaika 43' (pen.)	Report

Stal Stadium, Alchevsk
Attendance: 4,500
Referee: Leonid Bavykin (Kharkiv)

27 September 1994
18:00

Khimik Zhytomyr (1L)	2–0	(PL) Torpedo Zaporizhzhia
Sofilkanych 23'; Shumylo 73'	Report

Lenin's Komsomol Stadium, Zhytomyr
Attendance: 3,000
Referee: Oleksandr Tyutyun (Fastiv)

14 October 1994
15:00

Hazovyk Komarno (2L)	0–2	(PL) Dynamo Kyiv
	Report	Jishkariani 3', 30'

Hazovyk Stadium, Komarno
Attendance: 12,000
Referee: Stepan Selmenskyi (Uzhhorod)

==== Second leg ====
31 October 1994

Dnipro Dnipropetrovsk (PL)	4–1	(1L) Dynamo-2 Kyiv
Konovalov 32', 35'; Fedkov 34'; Kotyuk 78'	[ Report]	Shevchenko 14'

Meteor Stadium, Dnipropetrovsk
Attendance: 1,500
Referee: Roman Zan (Lviv)

Dnipro won 5–4 on aggregate

1 November 1994
15:00

Chornomorets Odesa (PL)	4–0	(2L) Medita Shakhtarsk
Zhabchenko 26'; Parakhnevych 62', 87'; Horshkov 89'	[ Report]

Black Sea Shipping Stadium, Odesa
Attendance: 2,000
Referee: Oleksandr Tyutyun (Fastiv)

Chornomorets won 6–2 on aggregate

1 November 1994
15:00

Karpaty Lviv (PL)	3–0	(1L) Zakarpattia Uzhhorod
Pokladok 46', 74'; Shumsky 57'	[ Report]

Ukraina Stadium, Lviv
Attendance: 3,500
Referee: M.Ovchar

Karpaty won 4–2 on aggregate

1 November 1994

Temp Shepetivka (PL)	2–0	(3L) Keramik Baranivka
Kapanadze 34', 51' (pen.)	[ Report]

Temp Stadium, Shepetivka
Attendance: 4,500
Referee: V.Yuhas

Temp won 2–1 on aggregate

1 November 1994

Metalurh-Viktor Zaporizhzhia (PL)	2–1	(1L) SC Odesa
Lipsky 47'; Luchkevych 64'	[ Report]	Avdeyev 60'

Metalurh Stadium, Zaporizhzhia
Attendance: 5,000
Referee: Oleksandr Hordiyenko (Dnipropetrovsk)

Metalurh-Viktor won 3–2 on aggregate

1 November 1994

Volyn Lutsk (PL)	2–1	(1L) Vorskla Poltava
Krukovets 27' (pen.); Dykyi 84'	[ Report]	A.Tolstov 24'

Avanhard Stadium, Lutsk
Attendance: 1,300
Referee: I.Ishchenko

Vorskla won 3–2 on aggregate

1 November 1994

Veres Rivne (PL)	3–0	(PL) Borysfen Boryspil
Zakotyuk 49'; Palyanytsia 87'; Shaporenko 90'	[ Report]	Sukiasyan (penalty missed) 72'

Avanhard Stadium, Rivne
Attendance: 4,500
Referee: V.Onufer

Veres won 3–1 on aggregate

1 November 1994

Shakhtar Donetsk (PL)	2–1	(3L) Systema-Boreks Borodyanka
Hrachov 6'; Zubov 42'	[ Report]	Mykolayenko 57'

Shakhtar Stadium, Donetsk
Attendance: 2,000
Referee: V.Holovko

Shakhtar won 5–1 on aggregate

1 November 1994

Nyva Ternopil (PL)	4–0	(2L) Yavir Krasnopillya
Demianchuk 13'; Rudnytsky 35' (pen.); Nikolaichuk 37'; Prokhorenkov 89'	[ Report]

City Stadium, Ternopil
Attendance: 5,000
Referee: I.Bezuhly

Nyva T. won 4–0 on aggregate

1 November 1994

Kryvbas Kryvyi Rih (PL)	7–1	(2L) Viktor Zaporizhzhia
Yakovenko 15', 26'; Maltsev 22', 50', 59'; Pantilov 73' (pen.); Kurilenko 76'	[ Report]	Kosenko 10'

Metalurh Stadium, Kryvyi Rih
Attendance: 4,000
Referee: O.Kozachenko

Kryvbas won 11–1 on aggregate

1 November 1994

Kremin Kremenchuk (PL)	5–0	(3L) Avanhard Rovenky
Fedkov 11', 50', 70'; A.Korponai 22'; I.Korponai 84'	[ Report]

Dnipro Stadium, Kremenchuk
Attendance: 4,000
Referee: V.Petrov

Kremin won 7–2 on aggregate

1 November 1994

Tavriya Simferopol (PL)	3–1	(3L) Khutrovyk Tysmenytsia
Antyukhin 23', 62'; Kundenok 52'	[ Report]	Savka (red card) 41'; Rusak 64'

Lokomotyv Stadium, Simferopol
Attendance: 800
Referee: V.Shtunder

Tavriya won 4–2 on aggregate

1 November 1994

Nyva Vinnytsia (PL)	2–1	(2L) Tytan Armyansk
Nahornyak 7', 56'	[ Report]	Nykyforov 11'

Central City Stadium, Vinnytsia
Attendance: 2,000
Referee: V.Hrymalyuk

Nyva V. won 5–3 on aggregate

1 November 1994

Zorya Luhansk (PL)	1–1	(1L) Stal Alchevsk
Hrydyushko 43' (pen.)	[ Report]	Manko 49'

Avanhard Stadium, Luhansk
Attendance: 3,000
Referee: A.Kosolapov

Stal won 3–1 on aggregate

1 November 1994

Torpedo Zaporizhzhia (PL)	4–1	(1L) Khimik Zhytomyr
Horobets 10'; Huzenko 28' (pen.); Bondarenko 50'; Ralyuchenko 65'	[ Report]	Kamzyuk 57'

AvtoZAZ Stadium, Zaporizhzhia
Attendance: 4,000
Referee: S.Shebek

Torpedo won 4–3 on aggregate

5 November 1994

Dynamo Kyiv (PL)	2–0	(2L) Hazovyk Komarno
Mykhailenko 58', 68'	[ Report]

Dynamo Stadium, Kyiv
Attendance: 1,000
Referee: Oleksandr Tyutyun (Fastiv)

Dynamo won 4–0 on aggregate

=== Round of 16 ===
Team 1	Agg.	Team 2	1st leg	2nd leg
FC Metalurh–Viktor Zaporizhzhia	1–4	FC Dnipro Dnipropetrovsk	1–3	0–1
FC Chornomorets Odesa	3–2	FC Kremin Kremenchuk	2–0	1–2
SC Tavriya Simferopol	4–3	FC Karpaty Lviv	3–0	1–3
FC Veres Rivne	1–2	FC Temp Shepetivka	1–0	0–2
FC Vorskla Poltava	0–9	FC Shakhtar Donetsk	0–1	0–8
FC Stal Alchevsk	1–2	FC Nyva Vinnytsia	1–0	0–2
FC Kryvbas Kryvyi Rih	3–4	FC Nyva Ternopil	3–0	0–4
FC Dynamo Kyiv	2–1	FC Torpedo Zaporizhzhia	2–0	0–1

==== First leg ====
22 November 1994

Metalurh-Viktor Zaporizhzhia (PL)	1–3	(PL) Dnipro Dnipropetrovsk
Vanin 8'	[ Report]	Maksymov 1'; Finkel 3'; Pokhlyebayev 10'

Metalurh Stadium, Zakarpattia
Attendance: 2,000
Referee: Viktor Derdo

22 November 1994

Chornomorets Odesa (PL)	2–0	(PL) Kremin Kremenchuk
Huseinov 37'; Sak 58'	[ Report]

Black Sea Shipping Stadium, Odesa
Attendance: 2,000
Referee: V.Shevchenko

22 November 1994

Tavriya Simferopol (PL)	3–0	(PL) Karpaty Lviv
Volkov 27'; Haidash 65'; Antyukhin 90'	[ Report]

Lokomotyv Stadium, Simferopol
Attendance: 750
Referee: L.Bavykin

22 November 1994

Veres Rivne (PL)	1–0	(PL) Temp Shepetivka
Filimonov 78'	[ Report]

Avanhard Stadium, Rivne
Attendance: 4,100
Referee: V.Melnychuk

22 November 1994

Vorskla Poltava (1L)	0–1	(PL) Shakhtar Donetsk
	[ Report]	Byelichenko 69'

Vorskla Stadium, Poltava
Attendance: 6,000
Referee: Ya.Hrysyo

22 November 1994

Stal Alchevsk (1L)	1–0	(PL) Nyva Vinnytsia
Manko (penalty missed) 56'; Chaika 78' (pen.)	[ Report]	Ryabtsev (yellow card) 63' (yellow-red card) 68'

Stal Stadium, Alchevsk
Attendance: 4,500
Referee: Volodymyr Pyanykh (Donetsk)

22 November 1994

Kryvbas Kryvyi Rih (PL)	3–0	(PL) Nyva Ternopil
Nichenko 12', 45', 47'	[ Report]

Metalurh Stadium, Kryvyi Rih
Attendance: 4,000
Referee: I.Yaremchuk

25 February 1995

Dynamo Kyiv (PL)	2–0	(PL) Torpedo Zaporizhzhia
Konovalov 4'; Shevchenko 61' (pen.)	[ Report]

Republican Stadium, Kyiv
Attendance: 5,400
Referee: Onufer

==== Second leg ====
27 November 1994

Dnipro Dnipropetrovsk (PL)	1–0	(PL) Metalurh-Viktor Zaporizhzhia
Konovalov 60'	[ Report]

Meteor Stadium, Dnipropetrovsk
Attendance: 1,500
Referee: Oleksandr Tyutyun (Fastiv)

Dnipro won 4–1 on aggregate

27 November 1994

Kremin Kremenchuk (PL)	2–1	(PL) Chornomorets Odesa
Fedkov 38'; Kazmirchuk 72'	[ Report]	Gashkin 17'

Dnipro Stadium, Kremenchuk
Attendance: 5,000
Referee: S.Selmensky (Uzhhorod)

Chornomorets won 3–2 on aggregate

27 November 1994

Karpaty Lviv (PL)	3–1	(PL) Tavriya Simferopol
Riznyk 61', 85'; Pokladok 70'	[ Report]	Holovko 8'

Ukraina Stadium, Lviv
Attendance: 2,700
Referee: S.Tatulyan

Tavriya won 4–3 on aggregate

27 November 1994

Temp Shepetivka (PL)	2–0	(PL) Veres Rivne
T.Kapanadze 22'; Homanaw 76'; T.Kapanadze (penalty missed) 82'	[ Report]

Temp Stadium, Shepetivka
Attendance: 5,000
Referee: V.Holovko

Temp won 2–1 on aggregate

27 November 1994

Shakhtar Donetsk (PL)	8–0	(1L) Vorskla Poltava
Matveyev 11', 24', 34', 41'; Hrachov 64' (pen.); Atelkin 85'	[ Report]	Levchuk 57' (own)

Shakhtar Stadium, Donetsk
Attendance: 700
Referee: I.Horozhankin

Shakhtar won 9–0 on aggregate

27 November 1994

Nyva Vinnytsia (PL)	2–0	(1L) Stal Alchevsk
Laktionov 72'; Okhrimchuk 84'	[ Report]

Central City Stadium, Vinnytsia
Attendance: 2,000
Referee: V.Hrymalyuk

Nyva V. won 2–1 on aggregate

27 November 1994

Nyva Ternopil (PL)	4–0	(PL) Kryvbas Kryvyi Rih
Prokhorenkov 16'; Yavorsky 18', 58', 85'	[ Report]

City Stadium, Ternopil
Attendance: 7,000
Referee: S.Shebek

Nyva T. won 4–3 on aggregate

1 March 1995

Torpedo Zaporizhzhia (PL)	1–0	(PL) Dynamo Kyiv
Cherkun 3'	[ Report]

AvtoZAZ Stadium, Zaporizhzhia
Attendance: 8,500
Referee: Zvyahitsev (Donetsk)

Dynamo won 2–1 on aggregate

=== Quarterfinals ===
Team 1	Agg.	Team 2	1st leg	2nd leg
FC Nyva Ternopil	1–3	FC Shakhtar Donetsk	1–1	0–2
FC Chornomorets Odesa	3–1	FC Nyva Vinnytsia	3–0	0–1
FC Dynamo Kyiv	1–3	SC Tavriya Simferopol	0–1	1–2
FC Temp Shepetivka	0–3	FC Dnipro Dnipropetrovsk	0–2	0–1

==== First leg ====
10 April 1995

Nyva Ternopil (PL)	1–1	(PL) Shakhtar Donetsk
Yavorsky 45' (pen.)	[ Report]	Matveyev 53'

City Stadium, Ternopil
Attendance: 15,000
Referee: O.Kosolapov

10 April 1995
16:00

Chornomorets Odesa (PL)	3–0	(PL) Nyva Vinnytsia
Kardash 11'; Musolitin 75', 87'	[ Report]

Black Sea Shipping Stadium, Odesa
Attendance: 2,000
Referee: V.Onufer (Uzhhorod)

10 April 1995

Dynamo Kyiv (PL)	0–1	(PL) Tavriya Simferopol
	[ Report]	Antyukhin 73'

Republican Stadium, Kyiv
Attendance: 1,000
Referee: Volodymyr Pyanykh (Donetsk)

10 April 1995

Temp Shepetivka (PL)	0–2	(PL) Dnipro Dnipropetrovsk
	[ Report]	Moskvyn 20'; Chuichenko 85'

Temp Stadium, Shepetivka
Attendance: 5,000
Referee: A.Aranovsky

==== Second leg ====
17 April 1995

Shakhtar Donetsk (PL)	2–0	(PL) Nyva Ternopil
Petrov 38' (pen.); Ostashov 75'; Orbu (red card) 58'	[ Report]	Kurayev (red card) 35'

Shakhtar Stadium, Donetsk
Attendance: 4,500
Referee: I.Horozhankin

Shakhtar won 3–1 on aggregate

17 April 1995

Nyva Vinnytsia (PL)	1–0	(PL) Chornomorets Odesa
Holokolosov 70'	[ Report]

Central City Stadium, Vinnytsia
Attendance: 5,000
Referee: L.Bavykin

Chornomorets won 3–1 on aggregate

17 April 1995

Tavriya Simferopol (PL)	2–1	(PL) Dynamo Kyiv
Oparin 3'; Holovko 69'	[ Report]	Rebrov 87'

Lokomotyv Stadium, Simferopol
Attendance: 3,500
Referee: Yaroslav Hrysyo (Lviv)

Tavriya won 3–1 on aggregate

10 April 1995

Dnipro Dnipropetrovsk (PL)	1–0	(PL) Temp Shepetivka
Palyanytsia 49'	[ Report]

Meteor Stadium, Dnipropetrovsk
Attendance: 2,000
Referee: V.Melnychuk

Dnipro won 3–0 on aggregate

=== Semifinals ===
Team 1	Agg.	Team 2	1st leg	2nd leg
FC Shakhtar Donetsk	(a) 2–2	FC Chornomorets Odesa	1–0	1–2
SC Tavriya Simferopol	1–2	FC Dnipro Dnipropetrovsk	1–1	0–1

==== First leg ====
8 May 1995

Shakhtar Donetsk (PL)	1–0	(PL) Chornomorets Odesa
Kriventsov 18'; Leonov (red card) 62'	[ Report]	Kardash (red card) 62'

Shakhtar Stadium, Donetsk
Attendance: 8,000
Referee: V.Melnychuk

8 May 1995

Tavriya Simferopol (PL)	1–1	(PL) Dnipro Dnipropetrovsk
Pyatenko 40'	[ Report]	Palyanytsia 70'

Lokomotvy Stadium, Simferopol
Attendance: 3,300
Referee: V.Onufer

==== Second leg ====
16 May 1995
18:00

Chornomorets Odesa (PL)	2–1	(PL) Shakhtar Donetsk
Zhabchenko 60'; Huseinov 65'	[ Report]	Petrov 20'

Black Sea Shipping Stadium, Odesa
Attendance: 6,000
Referee: Yaroslav Hrysyo (Lviv)

Shakhtar won on away goal rule

16 May 1995

Dnipro Dnipropetrovsk (PL)	1–0	(PL) Tavriya Simferopol
Bahmut 53'	[ Report]

Meteor Stadium, Dnipropetrovsk
Attendance: 9,000
Referee: V.Shevcehnko

Dnipro won 2–1 on aggregate

=== Final ===
The final was held at the Republican Stadium on May 28, 1995, in Kyiv.

28 May 1995
17:00

Shakhtar Donetsk	1–1 (a.e.t.)	Dnipro Dnipropetrovsk
Ihor Petrov 77'	Report	Oleksandr Zakharov 23'
Penalties
Petrov (penalty scored); Matveyev (penalty scored); Kriventsov (penalty scored); Babiy (penalty scored); Orbu (penalty scored); Leonov (penalty scored); Koval (penalty scored)	7:6	(penalty scored) Skrypnyk; (penalty scored) Bahmut; (penalty scored) Diryavka; (penalty scored) Polunin; (penalty scored) Kovalets; (penalty scored) Horily; (penalty missed) Finkel

Republican Stadium, Kyiv
Attendance: 42,500
Referee: Viktor Derdo (Illichivsk)

Note, Skrypnyk (Dnipro) started the penalty shootout.

Ukrainian Cup 1994–95 Winners

FC Shakhtar Donetsk
First title

== Top goalscorers ==
Scorer	Goals	Team
(Ukraine) Andriy Shevchenko	6 (1)	Dynamo-2 Kyiv; Dynamo Kyiv
(Ukraine) Serhiy Nahornyak	5	Nyva Vinnytsia
(Russia) Andrei Fedkov	5	Kremin Kremenchuk
(Ukraine) Oleh Matveyev	5	Shakhtar Donetsk
(Ukraine) Andriy Nikiforov	5 (2)	Tytan Armyansk; Chornomorets Odesa

== Attendances ==
=== Top attendances ===
Rank	Round	Home team	Away team	Result	Location	Attendance
1	Final	Shakhtar Donetsk	Dnipro Dnipropetrovsk	1 – 1 aet	Republican Stadium, Kyiv	42,500
2	Quarterfinals	Nyva Ternopil	Shakhtar Donetsk	1–1	City Stadium, Ternopil	15,000
3	Round of 32	Hazovyk Komarno	Dynamo Kyiv	0–2	Hazovyk Stadium, Komarno	12,000
4	Semifinals	Dnipro Dnipropetrovsk	Tavriya Simferopol	1–0	Meteor Stadium, Dnipropetrovsk	9,000
5	Round of 16	Torpedo Zaporizhzhia	Dynamo Kyiv	1–0	AvtoZAZ Stadium, Zaporizhzhia	8,500

== Number of teams by region ==
Number	Region	Team(s)
8	Lviv Oblast	Karpaty Lviv, FC Lviv, Halychyna Drohobych, Hazovyk Komarne, LAZ Lviv, Avanhard Zhydachiv, Sokil Zolochiv and Skala Stryi
7	Dnipropetrovsk Oblast	Dnipro Dnipropetrovsk, Metalurh Nikopol, Sirius Kryvyi Rih, Shakhtar Pavlohrad, Metalurh Novomoskovsk, Metalurh Kryvyi Rih and Kryvbas Kryvyi Rih
7	Luhansk Oblast	Zorya-MALS Luhansk, Khimik Severodonetsk, Dynamo Luhansk, Avanhard Rovenky, Shakhtar Stakhanov, Batkivshchyna Pervomaisk and Stal Alchevsk
6	Crimea	Tavriya Simferopol, Tytan Armyansk, Chaika Sevastopol, Okean Kerch, Chaika Okhotnykove and Dynamo Saky
6	Donetsk Oblast	Shakhtar Donetsk, Medita Shakhtarsk, Azovets Mariupol, Shakhtar-2 Donetsk, Shakhtar Horlivka and Bazhanovets Makiivka
6	Zaporizhia Oblast	Torpedo Zaporizhia, Druzhba Berdiansk, Viktor Zaporizhia, Torpedo Melitopol, Nyva-Viktor Novomykolaivka and Metalurh Zaporizhia
5	Kyiv	Dynamo, Dynamo-2, CSKA Kyiv, Obolon-Zmina and CSKA-Borysfen
5	Kyiv Oblast	Transimpeks-Ros Bila Tserkva, Systema-Boreks Borodianka, Skhid Slavutych, Kolos Karapyshi and Nyva Myronivka
5	Odesa Oblast	Chornomorets Odesa, Chornomorets-2 Odesa, Dnistrovets Bilhorod-Dnistrovskyi, Pervomayets Pershotravneve and SC Odesa
5	Poltava Oblast	Kremin Kremenchuk, Naftokhimik Kremenchuk, Vahonobudivnyk Kremenchuk, Sula Lubny and Vorskla Poltava
4	Kherson Oblast	Meliorator Kakhovka, Tavriya Novotroitske, Kharchovyk Bilozerka and Vodnyk Kherson
4	Khmelnytskyi Oblast	Temp Shepetivka, Advis Khmelnytskyi, Enerhetyk Netishyn and Podillya Khmelnytskyi
4	Sumy Oblast	Naftovyk Okhtyrka, Yavir Krasnopillia, Lokomotyv Konotop and FC Sumy
4	Ternopil Oblast	Nyva Ternopil, Dnister Zalishchyky, Sokil Velyki Hayi and Krystal Chortkiv
4	Zakarpattia Oblast	Zakarpattia Uzhhorod, Fetrovyk Khust, Baktyanets Badalove and Karpaty Mukachevo
3	Chernivtsi Oblast	Bukovyna Chernivtsi, Karpaty Chernivtsi and Lada Chernivtsi
3	Ivano-Frankivsk Oblast	Prykarpattia Ivano-Frankivsk, Beskid Nadvirna and Khutrovyk Tysmenytsia
3	Kharkiv Oblast	Metalist Kharkiv, Avanhard Merefa and Oskil Kupyansk
3	Kirovohrad Oblast	Zirka Kirovohrad, Lokomotyv Znamianka and Polihraftekhnika Oleksanriya
3	Mykolaiv Oblast	SC Mykolaiv, Nyva Nechayane and Artania Ochakiv
3	Zhytomyr Oblast	Khimik Zhytomyr, Krok Zhytomyr and Keramik Baranivka
2	Cherkasy Oblast	Dnipro Cherkasy and Lokomtyv Smila
2	Rivne Oblast	Veres Rivne and Krystal Dubno
2	Vinnytsia Oblast	Nyva Vinnytsia and Khimik-Nyva-2 Vinnytsia
2	Volyn Oblast	Volyn Lutsk and Pidshypnyk Lutsk
1	Chernihiv Oblast	Desna Chernihiv

== See also ==
- Ukrainian Premier League 1994-95
