= 1995 Ukrainian Cup final =

- Event: Ukrainian Cup 1994-95
Shakhtar Donetsk	Dnipro Dnipropetrovsk
1	1
- Shakhtar Donetsk won 7–6 on penalties
- Date: 28 May 1995
- Venue: Republican Stadium, Kyiv
- Referee: Viktor Derdo (Illichivsk)
- Attendance: 42,500
- Weather: 28 °C

The 1995 Ukrainian Cup final was a football match that took place at the Republican Stadium on 28 May 1995. The match was the 4th Ukrainian Cup Final and it was contested by FC Shakhtar Donetsk and FC Dnipro Dnipropetrovsk. The 1995 Ukrainian Cup Final was the fourth to be held in the Ukrainian capital Kyiv. Shakhtar won on penalty kicks 7–6 after the score was tied 1–1.

There were four yellow cards issued at this game: three to Shakhtar players and one to Dnipro.

== Road to Kyiv ==
Both teams started from the first round of the competition (1/16). Shakhtar stormed through the first three rounds beating Vorskla in Donetsk 8–0. In the semi-final it defeated the Cup holder Chornomorets. Dnipro had a little bit of trouble in the first round of competition facing the second team of Dynamo Kyiv. Later the team gained a great momentum defeating Tavria in the semi-final.

Shakhtar

Round 1 (1st leg)	Systema-Borex	0–3	Shakhtar
Round 1 (2nd leg)	Shakhtar	2–1	Systema-Borex
	(Shakhtar won 5–1 on aggregate)		
Round 2 (1st leg)	Vorskla	0–1	Shakhtar
Round 2 (2nd leg)	Shakhtar	8–0	Vorskla
	(Shakhtar won 9–0 on aggregate)		
Quarter-final (1st leg)	Nyva T.	1–1	Shakhtar
Quarter-final (2nd leg)	Shakhtar	2–0	Nyva T.
	(Shakhtar won 3–1 on aggregate)		
Semi-final (1st leg)	Shakhtar	1–0	Chornomorets
Semi-final (2nd leg)	Chornomorets	2–1	Shakhtar
	(Shakhtar won 2–2 on away goal rule)		

Dnipro

Round 1 (1st leg)	Dynamo-2	3–1	Dnipro
Round 1 (2nd leg)	Dnipro	4–1	Dynamo-2
	(Dnipro won 5–4 on aggregate)		
Round 2 (1st leg)	Metalurh	1–3	Dnipro
Round 2 (2nd leg)	Dnipro	1–0	Metalurh
	(Dnipro won 4–1 on aggregate)		
Quarter-final (1st leg)	Temp	0–2	Dnipro
Quarter-final (2nd leg)	Dnipro	1–0	Temp
	(Dnipro won 3–0 on aggregate)		
Semi-final (1st leg)	Tavriya	1–1	Dnipro
Semi-final (2nd leg)	Dnipro	1–0	Tavriya
	(Dnipro won 2–1 on aggregate)		

== Match details ==
28 May 1995
??:?? LST

Shakhtar Donetsk	1 – 1 (a.e.t.) (7 – 6 pen.)	Dnipro Dnipropetrovsk
Petrov 78'	Report	23' Zakharov
Penalties
Petrov (penalty scored); Matveyev (penalty scored); Kriventsov (penalty scored); Babiy (penalty scored); Orbu (penalty scored); Leonov (penalty scored); Koval (penalty scored)	7 – 6	(penalty scored) Skrypnyk; (penalty scored) Bahmut; (penalty scored) Diriavka; (penalty scored) Polunin; (penalty scored) Kovalets; (penalty scored) Horilyi; (penalty missed) Finkel

Republican Stadium, Kyiv
Attendance: 42,500
Referee: Viktor Derdo (Illichivsk), (FIFA)

Shakhtar Donetsk	Dnipro Dnipropetrovsk

Shakhtar Donetsk:
GK	?	(Ukraine) Dmytro Shutkov	(yellow card) 67'
MF	?	(Ukraine) Ihor Leonov
DF	?	(Ukraine) Oleksandr Koval
DF	?	(Ukraine) Serhiy Yashchenko (c)
DF	?	(Ukraine) Serhiy Popov	(substituted off) 38'
MF	?	(Ukraine) Serhiy Onopko	(substituted off) 12'
DF	?	(Ukraine) Hennadiy Orbu	(yellow card) 89'
DF	?	(Ukraine) Oleksandr Martyuk	(yellow card) 90'	(substituted off) 100'
MF	?	(Ukraine) Serhiy Atelkin	(substituted off) 89'
FW	?	(Ukraine) Valeriy Kryventsov
FW	?	(Ukraine) Oleh Matveyev
Substitutes:
DF	?	(Ukraine) Ihor Petrov	(substituted in) 38'	78'
MF	?	(Ukraine) Oleksandr Voskoboynyk	(substituted in) 12'
MF	?	(Ukraine) Oleksandr Babiy	(substituted in) 100'
MF	?	(Ukraine) Serhiy Kovalyov	(substituted in) 89'
Manager:
(Russia) Vladimir Salkov

Dnipro Dnipropetrovsk:
GK	?	(Ukraine) Mykola Medin	(substituted off) 120'
DF	?	(Ukraine) Dmytro Topchiyev	(yellow card) 67'	(substituted off) 88'
MF	?	(Ukraine) Dmytro Yakovenko
MF	?	(Ukraine) Volodymyr Horilyi
MF	?	(Ukraine) Volodymyr Bahmut
FW	?	(Ukraine) Andriy Polunin (c)
DF	?	(Ukraine) Oleksandr Zakharov	23'	(substituted off) 25'
DF	?	(Ukraine) Viktor Skrypnyk
MF	?	(Ukraine) Oleksandr Palyanytsia	(substituted off) 97'
FW	?	(Ukraine) Serhiy Kovalets
DF	?	(Ukraine) Volodymyr Sharan	(substituted off) 76'
Substitutes:
DF	?	(Ukraine) Sviatoslav Syrota	(substituted in) 120'
FW	?	(Ukraine) Serhiy Diryavka	(substituted in) 88'
FW	?	(Ukraine) Andriy Yudin	(substituted in) 25'
FW	?	(Ukraine) Borys Finkel	(substituted in) 97'
FW	?	(Ukraine) Valentyn Moskvyn	(substituted in) 76'
Manager:
(Germany) Bernd Stange

MATCH OFFICIALS

- Assistant referees:
  - Serhiy Shebek (Kyiv)
  - Ihor Horozhankin (Kirovohrad)
- Fourth official: Oleksandr Tiutiun (Fastiv)

MATCH RULES

- 90 minutes.
- 30 minutes of extra-time if necessary.
- Penalty shoot-out if scores still level.
- Seven named substitutes
- 3 substitutions, plus two more in extra time.

Ukrainian Cup 1995 Winners

FC Shakhtar Donetsk
First title

== Match statistics ==
	Shakhtar	Dnipro
Total shots	?	?
Shots on target	?	?
Ball possession	?%	?%
Corner kicks	?	?
Fouls committed	?	?
Offsides	?	?
Yellow cards	?	?
Red cards	?	?

== See also ==
- Ukrainian Cup 1994-95
