= List of FC Shakhtar Donetsk seasons =

This is a list of seasons played by Football Club Shakhtar Donetsk in Ukrainian, Soviet and European football, from 1936 (the year of the club's first entry) to the most recent completed season. Shakhtar Donetsk football club is considered to be founded as Stakhanovets, in April, 1936, on decision of All-Union Council on Physical Culture and Sports, based on former football team of Donbas. It was announced in local newspaper "Sotsialisticheskiy Donbass" (Socialist Donbas) on 9 April 1936. Itself the football team of Donbas consisted of players from Dynamo sports society some out of Stalino (now Donetsk), other from neighboring Horlivka. The team was gathered on initiative of the Yuzovka native and the team's captain Mykola Naumov and supported by the Coal-miners Union Central Committee (Russian: ЦК союз угольщиков). The first official competition, the team entered, was the 1936 Ukrainian spring tournament which was conducted by single elimination and was lost to Dynamo Odesa 2:3 in Horlivka.

During the Soviet period the club had modest achievements participating regularly in the Soviet top tier (Class A and Top League) since 1949, it missed only three seasons due to relegation. The club however won the USSR Cup in football four times and the USSR championship in football, Class B (precursor of the Soviet First League) once. Following dissolution of the Soviet Union, the club earned the most trophies becoming national leader in Ukraine. It has won the Top League/Premier League 13 times, the Ukrainian Cup in football 13 times, the Super Cup eight times, and the UEFA Cup once.

Shakhtar has appeared in several European competitions and is often a participant of the UEFA Champions League. The club became the first club in independent Ukraine to win the UEFA Cup in 2009, the last year before the competition was revamped as the Europa League. FC Shakhtar Donetsk is one of two Ukrainian clubs, the other one is Dynamo Kyiv, who have won a major UEFA competition.

Starting in 2014 the club has played (first) out of Lviv before moving early 2017 to Kharkiv with its headquarters in Kyiv. The club formerly played its home matches at the Donbass Arena, however, due to the conflict in Eastern Ukraine, the team relocated 600 miles to the west in Arena Lviv in the interim. Following the winter break of the 2016–17 season the club moved to the Metalist Stadium in Kharkiv (150 miles to the north of Donetsk) early 2017.

This list details the club's achievements in all major competitions, and the top scorers for each season. Top scorers with a "diamond" were also the top scorers in the Ukrainian league that season.

== Key ==
Key to league record:

- P – Played
- W – Games won
- D – Games drawn
- L – Games lost
- F – Goals for
- A – Goals against
- Pts – Points
- Pos – Final position

Key to colours and symbols:
Symbol	Meaning
↑	Promoted
↓	Relegated
EC	European Cup / Champions League
EC	UEFA Cup / Europa League
♦	Top league scorer in Shakhtar Donetsk's division

Key to rounds:

- Prel. – Preliminary round
- QR1 – First qualifying round
- QR2 – Second qualifying round, etc.
- Inter – Intermediate round (between qualifying rounds and rounds proper)
- GS – Group stage
- 1R – First round
- 2R – Second round, etc.
- R64 – 1/32 Final
- R32 – 1/16 Final
- R16 – 1/8 Final
- QF – Quarter-final
- SF – Semi-final
- F – Final
- W – Winners
- DNE – Did not enter

== Seasons ==
=== Soviet Union ===
Season	Div.	Pos.	Pl.	W	D	L	GS	GA	P	Domestic Cup	Soviet Cup	Notes
1936	3rd (Group V)	7	7	2	1	4	14	24	12	–	1/32	spring half
1936	3rd (Group V)	6	7	3	0	4	11	14	13	–	1/32	fall half
1937	3rd (Group V)	3	9	4	4	1	20	13	21	1/4	1/64	Promoted
1938	1st (Group A)	11	25	11	7	7	56	51	29	1/4	1/4	
1939	1st (Group A)	12	26	5	10	11	40	55	20	Not participated	1/4	
1940	1st (Group A)	12	24	6	4	14	32	43	16	Not participated		
1941	1st (Group A)	5	11	6	0	5	13	13	12	–		Unfinished
No championship in 1942–1944 due to the World War II
1944	No championship									Final pool		Cup competitions only
1945	2nd (Second Group)	5	17	9	5	3	36	25	23	1/2	1/8	
1946	2nd (Second Group)	5	24	10	7	7	45	23	27	1/2		
1947	2nd (Second Group)	2	24	15	4	5	48	19	34	1/16	1/32	
1948	2nd (Second Group)	3	14	8	3	3	33	15	19	1/2		Promoted
1949	1st (First Group)	18	34	5	8	21	21	73	18		1/16	

Season	Div.	Pos.	Pl.	W	D	L	GS	GA	P	Domestic Cup	Europe		Notes
1950	1st (Class A)	11	36	13	7	16	49	63	11	1/8			
1951	1st (Class A)	3	28	12	10	6	44	30	34	1/2			
1952	1st (Class A)	13	13	1	6	6	14	26	8	1/32			Relegated
1953	2nd (Class B)	1	14	9	4	1	33	9	22				
1953	2nd (Class B)	3	5	3	0	2	6	5	6	1/2			
1954	2nd (Class B)	1	22	17	4	1	56	16	38				
1954	2nd (Class B)	1	5	4	1	0	10	1	9	1/4			Promoted
1955	1st (Class A)	7	22	4	10	8	23	34	18	1/8			
1956	1st (Class A)	7	22	7	7	8	30	39	21				
1957	1st (Class A)	8	22	7	5	10	19	35	19	1/4			
1958	1st (Class A)	8	22	9	3	10	22	32	21	1/8			
1959	1st (Class A)	12	22	4	5	13	24	43	13	1/2			
1960	1st (Class A)	17	30	9	8	13	34	48	26				
1961	1st (Class A)	12	32	12	10	10	45	37	34	Winner			
1962	1st (Class A)	8	32	15	7	10	47	35	37	Winner			
1963	1st (Class A)	11	38	11	14	13	29	33	36	1/2			
1964	1st (Class A)	5	32	13	11	8	35	26	37	1/8			
1965	1st (Class A)	12	32	7	14	11	29	34	28	1/4			
1966	1st (Class A)	10	36	15	7	14	32	35	37				
1967	1st (Class A)	6	36	13	16	7	43	38	42	1/8			
1968	1st (Class A)	14	38	9	14	15	38	42	32	1/2			
1969	1st (Class A)	3	18	5	8	5	20	17	18	1/16			Group 2
1969	1st (Class A)	10	26	6	8	12	20	28	20	1/16			Final
1970	1st (Class A)	10	32	11	8	13	35	50	30	1/16			
1971	1st (Top League)	16	30	10	4	16	31	37	24	1/4			Relegated
1972	2nd (First League)	2	38	19	13	6	57	21	51	1/16			Promoted; Finalist of the Ukrainian Cup
1973	1st (Top League)	6	30	14	3	13	32	26	31	1/8			
1974	1st (Top League)	12	30	8	12	10	31	35	28	1/2			
1975	1st (Top League)	2	30	15	8	7	45	23	38	1/16			
1976	1st (Top League)	5	15	7	4	4	15	16	18	1/2			spring half
1976	1st (Top League)	10	15	5	4	6	12	10	14	1/2			fall half
1977	1st (Top League)	5	30	9	16	5	31	24	34	1/4	UC	1/8	
1978	1st (Top League)	3	30	16	5	9	42	31	37	Runner-up			
1979	1st (Top League)	2	34	20	8	6	57	33	48	Group stage	CWC	1/16	
1980	1st (Top League)	6	34	13	9	12	45	40	35	Winner	UC	1/32	
1981	1st (Top League)	7	34	12	10	12	51	39	34	Group stage	UC	1/32	
1982	1st (Top League)	14	34	10	9	15	42	57	29	Group stage			
1983	1st (Top League)	9	34	16	3	15	48	40	35	Winner			
1984	1st (Top League)	13	34	10	9	15	47	46	29	1/8	CWC	1/4	
1985	1st (Top League)	12	34	10	12	12	46	45	30	Runner-up			
1986	1st (Top League)	6	30	11	9	10	40	38	31	Runner-up			
1987	1st (Top League)	7	30	10	10	10	29	31	30	1/16			
1988	1st (Top League)	8	30	9	10	11	30	28	28	1/8			
1989	1st (Top League)	14	30	9	5	16	24	36	23	1/4			
1990	1st (Top League)	8	24	6	10	8	23	31	22	1/8			
1991	1st (Top League)	12	30	6	14	10	33	41	26	1/8			
1992	No championship									1/8			

=== Ukraine ===
Results of league and cup competitions by season
Season	Division	P	W	D	L	F	A	Pts	Pos	Cup	Super Cup	Cup	Result	Name	Goals
Season	League									Cup	Super Cup	UEFA		Top goalscorer	
1992	Premier League (1)	18	10	6	2	31	10	26	2nd	SF				Serhii Rebrov	11
1992–93	Premier League (1)	30	11	12	7	44	32	45	4th	R32				Serhiy Atelkin	12
1993–94	Premier League (1)	34	20	9	5	64	32	69	2nd	R16				Oleh Matviiv	20
1994–95	Premier League (1)	34	18	8	8	52	29	62	4th	Winners		UC	Prel.	Ihor Petrov	19
1995–96	Premier League (1)	34	13	6	15	44	43	45	10th	SF		CWC	R1		
1996–97	Premier League (1)	30	19	5	6	72	28	62	2nd	Winners				Oleh Matviiv ♦	21
1997–98	Premier League (1)	30	20	7	3	61	25	67	2nd	R16		CWC	R16	Valeriy Kryventsov	
1998–99	Premier League (1)	30	20	5	5	70	25	65	2nd	SF		UC	QR2	Andriy Vorobei	13
1999–2000	Premier League (1)	30	21	3	6	60	16	66	2nd	QF		UC	R1	Andriy Vorobei	15
2000–01	Premier League (1)	26	19	6	1	58	17	63	2nd	Winners		UCL UC	GS1 R3	Andriy Vorobei ♦	34
2001–02	Premier League (1)	26	20	6	0	61	10	66	1st	Winners		UCL UC	QR3 R1	Andriy Vorobei	16
2002–03	Premier League (1)	30	22	4	4	61	24	70	2nd	Runners-up		UCL UC	QR3 R1	Oleksiy Byelik	25
2003–04	Premier League (1)	30	22	4	4	62	19	70	2nd	Winners		UCL UC	QR3 R1	Zvonimir Vukić	13
2004–05	Premier League (1)	30	26	2	2	63	19	80	1st	Runners-up	Runners-up	UCL UC	GS R16	Brandão	20
2005–06	Premier League (1)	30	23	6	1	64	14	75	1st	R16	Winners	UCL UC	QR3 R32	Brandão ♦	21
2006–07	Premier League (1)	30	19	6	5	57	20	63	2nd	Runners-up	Runners-up	UCL UC	GS R16	Brandão	10
2007–08	Premier League (1)	30	24	2	4	75	24	74	1st	Winners	Runners-up	UCL	GS	Oleksandr Hladky	21
2008–09	Premier League (1)	30	19	7	4	47	16	64	2nd	Runners-up	Winners	UCL UC	GS Winners	Yevhen Seleznyov	11
2009–10	Premier League (1)	30	24	5	1	62	18	77	1st	SF		UCL UEL USC	QR3 R32 Runners-up	Luiz Adriano	17
2010–11	Premier League (1)	30	23	3	4	53	16	72	1st	Winners	Winners	UCL	QF	Luiz Adriano	20
2011–12	Premier League (1)	30	25	4	1	80	18	79	1st	Winners	Runners-up	UCL	GS	Luiz Adriano	16
2012–13	Premier League (1)	30	25	4	1	82	18	79	1st	Winners	Winners	UCL	R16	Henrikh Mkhitaryan ♦	29
2013–14	Premier League (1)	28	21	2	5	62	23	65	1st	Runners-up	Winners	UCL UEL	GS R32	Luiz Adriano ♦	25
2014–15	Premier League (1)	26	17	5	4	71	21	56	2nd	Runners-up	Winners	UCL	R16	Alex Teixeira ♦	22
2015–16	Premier League (1)	26	20	3	3	76	25	63	2nd	Winners	Winners	UCL UEL	GS SF	Alex Teixeira ♦	26
2016–17	Premier League (1)	32	25	5	2	66	24	80	1st	Winners	Runners-up	UCL UEL	QR3 R32	Facundo Ferreyra	16
2017–18	Premier League (1)	32	24	3	5	71	24	75	1st	Winners	Winners	UCL	R16	Facundo Ferreyra ♦	21
2018–19	Premier League (1)	32	26	5	1	73	11	83	1st	Winners	Runners-up	UCL UEL	GS R32	Júnior Moraes ♦	26
2019–20	Premier League (1)	32	26	4	2	80	26	82	1st	R16	Runners-up	UCL UEL	GS SF	Júnior Moraes	26
2020–21	Premier League (1)	26	16	6	4	54	19	54	2nd	QF	Runners-up	UCL UEL	GS R16	Manor Solomon	11
2021–22 was terminated	Premier League (1)	began on 24.02.2022 Russian invasion of Ukraine	15	2	1	49	10	47	1st	Not played after QF	Winner	UCL	GS	Tetê	10
2022–23	Premier League (1)	30	22	5	3	63	24	71	1st	Not played	Not played	UCL UEL	GS R16	Artem Bondarenko Mykhailo Mudryk	10
2023–24	Premier League (1)	30	22	6	2	69	21	72	1st	Winners	Not played	UCL UEL	GS KR PO	Danylo Sikan	16
2024–25	Premier League (1)	30	18	8	4	69	26	62	3rd	Winners	Not played	UCL	LP	Heorhiy Sudakov	15
2025–26	Premier League (1)	30	22	6	2	71	21	72	1st	R16	Not played	UEL UECL	TQR SF	Kauã Elias	11
2026–27	Premier League (1)	11	9	1	1	22	5	28	2nd	R8	Not played	UCL	LP		
