= 1997 Ukrainian Cup final =

- Event: Ukrainian Cup 1996-97
Shakhtar Donetsk	Dnipro Dnipropetrovsk
1	0
- Date: 25 May 1997
- Venue: NSC Olimpiyskyi, Kyiv
- Referee: Serhiy Tatulian (Kyiv)
- Attendance: 26,000
- Weather: 12 °C

The 1997 Ukrainian Cup final was a football match that took place at the NSC Olimpiyskiy on 25 May 1997. The match was the 6th Ukrainian Cup Final and it was contested by FC Shakhtar Donetsk and FC Dnipro Dnipropetrovsk. The 1997 Ukrainian Cup Final was the fifth to be held in the Ukrainian capital Kyiv. Shakhtar won by a single goal netted by Serhiy Atelkin in the 36th minute.

There also were a couple of yellow cards issued at this game, both of them to Shakhtar players: Potskhveria and Hennadiy Orbu.

== Road to Kyiv ==
Both teams started from the first round of the competition (1/16). Shakhtar, if not considering their first game in Mariupol, had some difficulties along the way meeting resistance from every team. Especially surprising was the face-off with Vorskla Poltava which almost revenged the miners for the face-slap from two years previously. In the semi-final Shakhtar defeated the Armymen which, alas, managed to show no teeth in their second game. Dnipro impressed when it easily defeated the two-time winners of the tournament, Chornomorets Odesa.

Shakhtar

Round 1	Metalurh M.	1–3	Shakhtar
Round 2	Zirka-NIBAS	0–1	Shakhtar
Quarter-final (1st leg)	Vorskla	0–0	Shakhtar
Quarter-final (2nd leg)	Shakhtar	2–1	Vorskla
	(Shakhtar won 2–1 on aggregate)		
Semi-final (1st leg)	Shakhtar	2–1	CSKA
Semi-final (2nd leg)	CSKA	0–3	Shakhtar
	(Shakhtar won 5–1 on aggregate)		

Dnipro

Round 1	Lviv	2–3	Dnipro
Round 2	Dnipro	2–0	Torpedo
Quarter-final (1st leg)	Chornomorets	0–1	Dnipro
Quarter-final (2nd leg)	Dnipro	3–0	Chornomorets
	(Dnipro won 4–0 on aggregate)		
Semi-final (1st leg)	Dnipro	3–0	Metalurh Z.
Semi-final (2nd leg)	Metalurh Z.	2–0	Dnipro
	(Dnipro won 3–2 on aggregate)		

== Match details ==
25 May 1997
??:?? LST

Shakhtar Donetsk	1 – 0	Dnipro Dnipropetrovsk
Atelkin 36'	Report

NSC Olimpiyskyi, Kyiv
Attendance: 26,000
Referee: Serhiy Tatulian (Kyiv), (FIFA)

Shakhtar Donetsk	Dnipro Dnipropetrovsk

Shakhtar Donetsk:
GK	?	(Ukraine) Dmytro Shutkov
MF	?	(Ukraine) Ihor Leonov
DF	?	(Georgia (country)) Mikhail Potskhveria	(yellow card) 63'
DF	?	(Ukraine) Oleksandr Babiy
DF	?	(Ukraine) Oleksandr Koval
MF	?	(Ukraine) Oleh Matveyev	(substituted off) 65'
DF	?	(Ukraine) Hennadiy Orbu	(yellow card) 87'
DF	?	(Ukraine) Serhiy Kovalyov	(substituted off) 57'
MF	?	(Ukraine) Hennadiy Zubov	(substituted off) 81'
FW	?	(Ukraine) Valeriy Kriventsov
FW	?	(Ukraine) Serhiy Atelkin
Substitutes:
DF	?	(Ukraine) Oleh Shelayev	(substituted in) 65'
MF	?	(Ukraine) Serhiy Kochvar	(substituted in) 57'
MF	?	(Ukraine) Oleksandr Spivak	(substituted in) 81'
Manager:
(Ukraine) Valeriy Yaremchenko

Dnipro Dnipropetrovsk:
GK	?	(Ukraine) Illya Blyznyuk
DF	?	(Ukraine) Oleksandr Poklonskyi
MF	?	(Ukraine) Kostyantyn Sosenko
MF	?	(Ukraine) Hennadiy Kozar
MF	?	(Ukraine) Ivan Pavlyukh
FW	?	(Ukraine) Ihor Kharkivshchenko
DF	?	(Ukraine) Volodymyr Sharan	(substituted off) 89'
DF	?	(Ukraine) Serhiy Nahornyak
MF	?	(Georgia (country)) Gia Kilasonia	(substituted off) 54'
FW	?	(Ukraine) Hennadiy Moroz
DF	?	(Georgia (country)) Varlam Kilasonia	(substituted off) 60'
Substitutes:
DF	?	(Ukraine) Oleksandr Kovalenko	(substituted in) 89'
FW	?	(Ukraine) Viktor Byelkin	(substituted in) 54'
FW	?	(Ukraine) Volodymyr Lyutyi	(substituted in) 60'
Manager:
(Ukraine) Vyacheslav Hroznyi

MATCH OFFICIALS

- Assistant referees:
  - Anatoliy Oliynyk (Simferopol)
  - Vitaliy Zviahitsev (Odesa)
- Fourth official: Vasyl Menychuk (Simferopol)

MATCH RULES

- 90 minutes.
- 30 minutes of extra-time if necessary.
- Penalty shoot-out if scores still level.
- Seven named substitutes
- 3 substitutions, plus two more in extra time.

Ukrainian Cup 1997 Winners

FC Shakhtar Donetsk
Second title

== Match statistics ==
	Shakhtar	Dnipro
Total shots	?	?
Shots on target	?	?
Ball possession	?%	?%
Corner kicks	?	?
Fouls committed	?	?
Offsides	?	?
Yellow cards	?	?
Red cards	?	?

== See also ==
- Ukrainian Cup 1996-97
