= Serhiy Diryavka =

Ukrainian footballer and coach

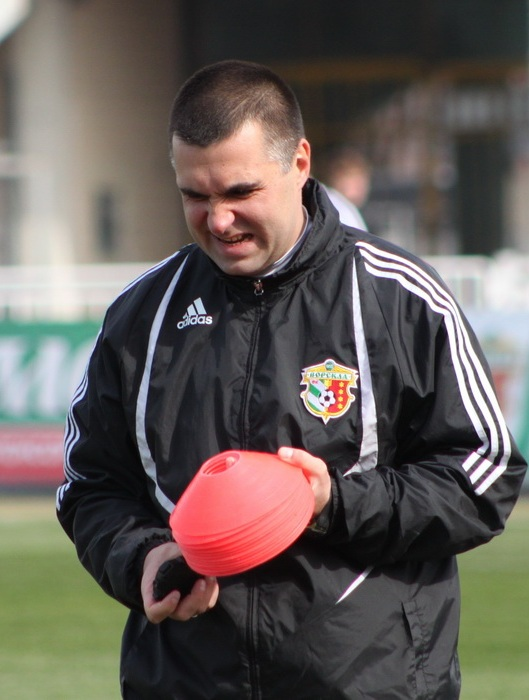

Personal information
- Full name: Serhiy Heorhiyovych Diryavka
- Date of birth: 18 April 1971 (age 55)
- Place of birth: Dnipropetrovsk, Ukrainian SSR, Soviet Union
- Height: 1.82 m (6 ft 0 in)
- Position: Centre-back

Youth career
- OShISP Dnipropetrovsk
- SDYuShOR Dnipro-75

Senior career*
Years	Team	Apps	(Gls)
1989–1996	Dnipro Dnipropetrovsk	96	(2)
1995–1996	→ CSKA-Borysfen Boryspil (loan)	25	(2)
1996	→ Metalurh Novomoskovsk (loan)	0	(0)
1996–1998	Kryvbas Kryvyi Rih	26	(0)
1998–2004	Illichivets Mariupol	136	(0)
2001–2003	→ Illichivets-2 Mariupol	5	(0)
Total		288	(4)

International career
1992–1995	Ukraine	9	(0)

Managerial career
- 2006: Stal Alchevsk (assistant)
- 2006: Illichivets-2 Mariupol (assistant)
- 2006–2007: Stal Dniprodzerzhynsk
- 2008–2012: Vorskla Poltava (assistant)
- 2012–2015: Illichivets Mariupol (assistant)
- 2015–2016: Petrykivka (amateurs)
- 2016–2017: Dnipro (assistant)
- 2017–2020: Dnipro-1 (assistant)
- 2020–2021: VPK-Ahro Shevchenkivka (assistant)
- 2021: Peremoha Dnipro (assistant)
- 2023: Hirnyk-Sport Horishni Plavni
- 2023–: Vilkhivtsi
- * Club domestic league appearances and goals

Serhiy Heorhiyovych Diryavka (Ukrainian: Сергій Георгійович Дірявка; born 18 April 1971) is a Ukrainian professional soccer coach and a former player.

== Club career ==
Diryavka is a product of the Dnipro city football schools including regional sports college as well as FC Dnipro football school "Dnipro-75". He joined the senior squad in 1988 and played for its reserve squad for three seasons in 1989–1991. His first games for the senior squad he played in the 1990–91 Soviet Cup in home and away games against FC Alga Bishkek. The same season he also participated in the 1990 USSR Federation Cup group staged and featured in 4 games for Dnipro.

His debut at the Soviet Top League came about in 1991 in the game against FC Shakhtar Donetsk on 5 August 1991. Diryavka managed to play 7 games in Top League for that season which ended up the last one in the Soviet Union. He also played a game in the 1991–92 Soviet Cup against FC Metalist Kharkiv.

In the Ukrainian national competitions Diryavka debuted in the 1992 Ukrainian Cup in a home/away playoff against FC Bukovyna Chernivtsi on 2 March 1992. Few days later on 7 March 1992 he played his first game at the Ukrainian Top League against FC Zorya-MALS Luhansk. Next season 1992–93 Vyshcha Liha, Diryavka played as a captain for FC Dnipro and managed to score twice scoring his debuting goal Zorya Luhansk. That season the club was also the main contender for the championship title and tying with FC Dynamo Kyiv on points for the first, but yielding the title based on additional tiebreaker rules. Diryavka also played at clubs' international level, particularly the 1993–94 UEFA Cup debuting for FC Dnipro in the game against FC Admira Wacker Wien.

In 1995 FC Dnipro made it to the 1995 Ukrainian Cup Final where Diryavka scored against FC Shakhtar Donetsk during post-game penalty shoot-out. He stayed with Dnipro until 1995 before joined the newly created FC CSKA-Borysfen Kyiv. He had a very good start for his new club scoring twice in his first three games. CSKA-Borysfen finished 4th that season. After the season Diryavka returned to Dnipro, but after only three games he was loaned out to FC Kryvbas Kryvyi Rih. While playing for Dnipro in 1996 he also on a loan played a game for the Dnipro's farm team FC Metalurh Novomoskovsk. In 1997 Diryavka joined Kryvbas as a free agent. Before the 1998–99 Vyshcha Liha season he joined the newly promoted FC Metalurh Mariupol with which stayed until his retirement in 2004.

== International career ==
On 28 October 1992, Diryavka made his debut for the national team in the friendly match against Belarus, but was substituted on 29th minute with Yuriy Sak.

== Coaching career ==
Diryavka started his coaching career in 2006 as an assistant to Mykola Pavlov in FC Stal Alchevsk. Later that year he appointed a manager in FC Stal Dniprodzerzhynsk that played in the Ukrainian First League. He managed to keep the club's mid-table position in the league and reached quarter-finals in the 2006–07 Ukrainian Cup setting the club's record in that competition. After a season in Dniprodzerzhynsk (today Kamianske), Diryavka again joined the Pavlov's coaching staff first in FC Vorskla Poltava and later Illichivets Mariupol. After the Pavlov's retirement in 2015, Diryavka managed a club in the Dnipropetrovsk Oblast competitions. In 2016 he joined the coaching staff of Dmytro Mykhailenko in FC Dnipro that was threatened by FIFA with sanctions. Due to the sanctions along with Mykhailenko he moved to SC Dnipro-1 in 2017. Since 2020 Diryavka continues to serve as an assistant coach for club of Ukrainian lower tiers.

== Career statistics ==
=== Club ===
Club	Season	League			National Cup		Continental		Other		Total	
Club	Season	Division	Apps	Goals	Apps	Goals	Apps	Goals	Apps	Goals	Apps	Goals
Dnipro Dnipropetrovsk	1990	Reserves	—		2	0	—		4	0	6	0
Dnipro Dnipropetrovsk	1991	Soviet Top League	7	0	2	0	—		—		9	0
Dnipro Dnipropetrovsk	Total USSR		7	0	4	0	—		4	0	15	0
Dnipro Dnipropetrovsk	1992	Vyshcha Liha	17	0	4	0	—		—		21	0
Dnipro Dnipropetrovsk	1992–93	Vyshcha Liha	25	2	2	0	—		—		27	2
Dnipro Dnipropetrovsk	1993–94	Vyshcha Liha	25	0	4	0	3	0	—		32	0
Dnipro Dnipropetrovsk	1994–95	Vyshcha Liha	19	0	7	0	—		—		26	0
CSKA-Borysfen Kyiv	1995–96	Vyshcha Liha	25	2	2	0	—		—		27	2
Dnipro Dnipropetrovsk	1996–97	Vyshcha Liha	3	0	—		—		—		3	0
Dnipro Dnipropetrovsk	Total Ukraine (Dnipro)		89	2	17	0	3	0	—		109	2
Dnipro Dnipropetrovsk	Total Dnipro		96	2	21	0	3	0	4	0	124	2
Metalurh Novomoskovsk (loan)	1996–97	Druha Liha	—		1	0	—		—		1	0
Kryvbas Kryvyi Rih	1996–97	Vyshcha Liha	13	0	—		—		—		13	0
Kryvbas Kryvyi Rih	1997–98	Vyshcha Liha	13	0	2	0	—		—		15	0
Kryvbas Kryvyi Rih	Total Kryvbas		26	0	2	0	—		—		28	0
Metalurh Mariupol	1998–99	Vyshcha Liha	25	0	—		—		—		25	0
Metalurh Mariupol	1999–2000	Vyshcha Liha	21	0	—		—		—		21	0
Metalurh Mariupol	2000–01	Vyshcha Liha	24	0	4	0	—		—		28	0
Metalurh Mariupol	2001–02	Vyshcha Liha	26	0	1	0	—		—		27	0
Metalurh-2 Mariupol	2001–02	Druha Liha	1	0	—		—		—		1	0
Illichivets Mariupol	2002–03	Vyshcha Liha	24	0	1	0	—		—		25	0
Illichivets Mariupol	2003–04	Vyshcha Liha	16	0	2	0	—		—		18	0
Illichivets-2 Mariupol	2003–04	Druha Liha	4	0	—		—		—		4	0
Illichivets Mariupol	Total Mariupol		136	0	8	0	—		—		144	0
Career Total			288	4	34	0	3	0	4	0	329	4

=== International ===
National Team	Year	Apps	Goals
Ukraine	1992	1	0
Ukraine	1993	2	0
Ukraine	1994	5	0
Ukraine	1995	1	0
Total		9	0

== Honours ==
Dnipro

- Ukrainian Premier League runner-up: 1992–93
- Ukrainian Cup finalist: 1995
