= Oleksandr Holokolosov =

Oleksandr Holokolosov is a Ukrainian name, may refer to:

- Oleksandr Holokolosov (football manager)
- Oleksandr Holokolosov (footballer born 1976)
