= Gennadi Orbu =

Gennadi Orbu is the name of:

- Ghenadie Orbu (born 1982), Moldovan international footballer
- Hennadiy Orbu (born 1970), Ukrainian international footballer
