= Oleksandr Koval (footballer) =

Ukrainian footballer and coach

Personal information
- Full name: Oleksandr Mykolayovych Koval
- Date of birth: 3 May 1974 (age 52)
- Place of birth: Donetsk, Ukrainian SSR
- Height: 1.86 m (6 ft 1 in)
- Positions: Defender; midfielder

Youth career
- UOR Donetsk
- Shakhtar Donetsk

Senior career*
Years	Team	Apps	(Gls)
1992–1999	Shakhtar Donetsk	181	(3)
1992–1993	→ Metalurh Kostiantynivka (loan)		
1997–1999	→ Shakhtar-2 Donetsk	23	(0)
2000	Metalurh Donetsk	12	(0)
2000	Levski Sofia	3	(0)
2001	Sokol Saratov	5	(0)
2001–2002	Stal Alchevsk	10	(0)
2002	FC Monolit Kostiantynivka		

International career
1994–1999	Ukraine	6	(0)

Managerial career
- 2003–2018: Shakhtar Donetsk (academy)
- 2018–2019: Shakhtar Donetsk (U-21, assistant)
- 2020–2022: Metalist 1925 Kharkiv (assistant)
- 2023: Zorya Luhansk (assistant)
- 2024–2025: Bukovyna Chernivtsi (assistant)
- 2025–: PerfectLanD (staff)
- * Club domestic league appearances and goals

Oleksandr Mykolayovych Koval (Ukrainian: Олександр Миколайович Коваль; born 3 May 1974) is a Ukrainian football coach and a former player. He works in the Czech football club PerfectLanD .

== Honours ==
Shakhtar Donetsk

- Ukrainian Premier League runner-up: 1993–94, 1996–97, 1997–98, 1998–99, 1999–2000
- Ukrainian Cup winner: 1994–95, 1996–97
