= Oleksiy Prokhorenkov =

Ukrainian footballer

Personal information
- Full name: Oleksiy Oleksiyovych Prokhorenkov
- Date of birth: 21 October 1971 (age 55)
- Place of birth: Dyatkovo, Russian SFSR
- Height: 1.83 m (6 ft 0 in)
- Position: Forward

Youth career
- KhGVUFK-1 Kharkov

Senior career*
Years	Team	Apps	(Gls)
1990–1994	FC Dnipro Cherkasy	135	(16)
1994–1995	FC Nyva Ternopil	41	(7)
1996	FC Krystal Chortkiv	4	(0)
1996–1998	FC Yavir Krasnopilya	40	(14)
1998–1999	FC Dynamo Moscow	5	(0)
1998–1999	→ FC Dynamo-d Moscow (loans)	28	(4)
1999	→ Žalgiris Kaunas (loan)	13	(3)
2000	FBK Kaunas	25	(9)
2002–2003	FC Spartak Sumy	5	(0)
2003–2004	FC Lokomotiv Kupiansk		
- * Club domestic league appearances and goals

Oleksiy Oleksiyovych Prokhorenkov (Ukrainian: Олексій Олексійович Прохоренков; born 21 October 1971) is a former Ukrainian football player.

== Honours ==
- A Lyga champion: 1999, 2000.
