= Ihor Cherkun =

Soviet-Ukrainian footballer and coach (1965–2021)

Personal information
- Full name: Ihor Valentynovych Cherkun
- Date of birth: 17 February 1965
- Place of birth: Melitopol, Ukrainian SSR
- Date of death: 24 September 2021 (aged 56)
- Place of death: Zaporizhzhia, Ukraine
- Height: 1.87 m (6 ft 2 in)
- Position: Defender

Youth career
- 1978–1982: Metalurh Zaporizhzhia

Senior career*
Years	Team	Apps	(Gls)
1982–1983	Metalurh Zaporizhzhia	0	(0)
1984	Tavriya Simferopol	0	(0)
1984–1985	Pnevmatyk Simferopol (amateurs)	?	(?)
1986	Torpedo Zaporizhzhia	36	(4)
1987–1990	Metalurh Zaporizhzhia	102	(2)
1990–1996	Torpedo Zaporizhzhia	171	(6)
1996–1997	Zirka-NIBAS Kirovohrad	4	(0)
1997	Torpedo Zaporizhzhia	14	(0)
1998–1999	Viktor Zaporizhzhia	30	(1)

Managerial career
- 2007–2014: Metalurh Zaporizhzhia (youth team)
- * Club domestic league appearances and goals

Ihor Cherkun (Ukrainian: Ігор Валентинович Черкун; 17 February 1965 – 24 September 2021) was a Soviet and Ukrainian football defensive player and coach.

== Career ==
Born in Melitopol, Cherkun was a product of Metalurh Zaporizhzhia youth sportive school system. His first trainer was Viktor Leyner. In 1981, under coach Oleksandr Tomakh, he began to play for Metalurh's double team. He started playing in the attack, later due to his tall stature he was transferred to the position of defender. In 1984 he was drafted into the army. For five months he served in the motorized infantry unit in Mykolaiv, during the service he played in the championship of the division, where he was spotted and transferred to Simferopol, where he got into the double of the local "Tavria". However, after the appointment of Anatoliy Konkov as the club's coach, the servicemen stopped being involved in the main team, and Cherkun played the rest of the service at an amateur level.

After demobilization he returned to Zaporozhzhia and played in the local teams. As part of Torpedo Zaporizhzhia Cherkun held the first championship of independent Ukraine. He made his debut in the Vyshcha Liha on 7 March 1992, appearing in the starting line-up in an away match against Tavriya Simferopol.

After retirement from playing career, he worked as children football trainer.
