= 1997–98 Vyshcha Liha =

7th season of top-tier football league in Vyshcha Liha

Vyshcha Liha
- Season: 1997–98
- Champions: Dynamo Kyiv; 6th title
- Relegated: Torpedo, Chornomorets
- Champions League: Dynamo Kyiv
- Cup Winners' Cup: CSKA Kyiv
- UEFA Cup: Shakhtar Donetsk
- Top goalscorer: (22) Serhii Rebrov (Dynamo)

The 1997–98 Vyshcha Liha season was the 7th since its establishment and the 2nd since the establishment of the Professional Football League (PFL). FC Dynamo Kyiv were the defending champions.

== Teams ==
This season, the Vyshcha Liha remained at 16 teams.

=== Promotions ===
- Metalurh Donetsk, the champion of the 1996–97 Ukrainian First League – (debut)
- Metalurh Mariupol, the third-place runner-up of the 1996–97 Ukrainian First League – (debut)

=== Relegated teams ===
- Kremin Kremenchuk – relegated after six seasons in the top flight.
- Nyva Vinnytsia – relegated after four seasons in the top flight.

=== Renamed ===
- During a winter break, Zirka-NIBAS Kirovohrad changed its name to Zirka Kirovohrad.

=== Location ===
Locations of teams home grounds in Ukrainian Premier League 1997-98

== Managers ==
Club	Coach	Replaced coach	Home stadium
FC Dynamo Kyiv	(Ukraine) Valery Lobanovsky		Dynamo Stadium
FC Shakhtar Donetsk	(Ukraine) Valery Yaremchenko		Shakhtar Stadium
FC Karpaty Lviv	(Ukraine) Myron Markevych		Ukraina Stadium
FC Dnipro Dnipropetrovsk	(Ukraine) Vadym Tyschenko	(Ukraine) Vyacheslav Hrozny 15 games (first half)	Meteor Stadium
FC Vorskla Poltava	(Ukraine) Oleksandr Dovbiy	(Ukraine) Viktor Pozhechevskyi 27 games (first half)	Vorskla Stadium
FC Metalurh Donetsk	(Ukraine) Volodymyr Onyschenko		Avanhard Stadium (Makiivka); Donetsk Metallurgical Factory Stadium
FC Nyva Ternopil	(Ukraine) Leonid Ischuk	(Ukraine) Ihor Yavorskyi 29 games	City Stadium
FC Kryvbas Kryvyi Rih	(Ukraine) Oleh Taran		Metalurh Stadium
FC Metalurh Zaporizhia	(Ukraine) Oleksandr Shtelin	(Ukraine) Oleksandr Tomakh 17 games (Ukraine) Leonid Kliuchyk 1 game	Metalurh Stadium
FC Prykarpattia Ivano-Frankivsk	(Ukraine) Bohdan Blavatskiy	(Ukraine) Ihor Yurchenko 15 games (first half)	Rukh Stadium
FC Zirka Kirovohrad	(Ukraine) Oleksandr Ischenko	(Ukraine) Oleksandr Dovbiy 27 games (Ukraine) Serhiy Strashnenko 1 game	Zirka Stadium
FC Metalurh Mariupol	(Ukraine) Mykola Pavlov	(Ukraine) Volodymyr Kuzovlev 1 game (Ukraine) Yuriy Pohrebniak 2 games	Azovstal Stadium
FC CSKA Kyiv	(Ukraine) Serhiy Morozov	(Ukraine) Volodymyr Bezsonov 15 games	CSK ZSU Stadium
SC Tavriya Simferopol	(Ukraine) Viktor Hrachov	(Ukraine) Ivan Balan 25 games	Lokomotyv Stadium
FC Chornomorets Odesa	(Ukraine) Volodymyr Kozerenko	(Ukraine) Leonid Buriak 22 games	Black Sea Shipping Stadium
FC Torpedo Zaporizhia	(Ukraine) Leonid Koltun	(Ukraine) Viktor Matvienko 18 games (Ukraine) Vyacheslav Pershyn 4 games	AvtoZAZ Stadium

=== Changes ===
Team	Outgoing head coach	Manner of departure	Date of vacancy	Table	Incoming head coach	Date of appointment	Table
SC Tavriya Simferopol	(Ukraine) Mykola Pavlov			pre-season	(Ukraine) Ivan Balan		pre-season
FC CSKA Kyiv	(Ukraine) Volodymyr Lozynsky			pre-season	(Ukraine) Volodymyr Bezsonov		pre-season
FC Kryvbas Kryvyi Rih	(Ukraine) Oleksandr Lysenko			pre-season	(Ukraine) Oleh Taran		pre-season
FC Prykarpattia Ivano-Frankivsk	(Ukraine) Viktor Kolotov			pre-season	(Ukraine) Ihor Yurchenko		pre-season

== League table ==
Pos	Team	Pld	W	D	L	GF	GA	GD	Pts	Qualification or relegation
1	Dynamo Kyiv (Note: Participants of the 1998 Ukrainian Cup Final) (C)	30	23	3	4	70	15	+55	72	Qualification to Champions League first qualifying round
2	Shakhtar Donetsk	30	20	7	3	61	25	+36	67	Qualification to UEFA Cup first qualifying round
3	Karpaty Lviv	30	16	9	5	36	20	+16	57	
4	Dnipro Dnipropetrovsk	30	17	4	9	47	27	+20	55	
5	Vorskla Poltava	30	15	4	11	41	46	−5	49	Qualification to Intertoto Cup first round
6	Metalurh Donetsk	30	11	7	12	28	27	+1	40	
7	Nyva Ternopil	30	12	4	14	37	39	−2	40	
8	Kryvbas Kryvyi Rih	30	10	9	11	34	33	+1	39	
9	Metalurh Zaporizhzhia	30	10	7	13	40	44	−4	37	
10	Prykarpattya Ivano-Frankivsk	30	8	9	13	33	41	−8	33	
11	Zirka Kirovohrad	30	9	6	15	27	48	−21	33	
12	Metalurh Mariupol	30	8	9	13	27	48	−21	33	
13	CSKA Kyiv	30	9	6	15	30	35	−5	33	Qualification to Cup Winners' Cup qualifying round
14	Tavriya Simferopol	30	8	9	13	35	41	−6	33	
15	Chornomorets Odesa (R)	30	8	8	14	31	39	−8	32	Relegated to Ukrainian First League
16	Torpedo Zaporizhzhia (R)	30	2	7	21	20	69	−49	13	Relegated to Ukrainian First League

Source: uafootball.net.ua
(C) Champions; (R) Relegated

== Results ==
Home \ Away	CHO	CSK	DNI	DYN	KAR	KRY	MDO	MTM	MZA	NVT	PRY	SHA	TAV	TZA	VOR	ZIR
Chornomorets Odesa	—	1–0	1–2	1–1	1–0	0–1	2–1	2–1	1–0	1–1	0–0	1–3	1–2	5–0	2–2	3–0
CSKA Kyiv	2–1	—	1–1	0–1	0–2	2–1	3–2	1–0	3–0	0–0	0–1	1–2	3–1	2–0	3–0	1–1
Dnipro	2–0	2–1	—	0–2	4–0	1–0	2–0	3–0	1–0	0–1	1–0	2–0	2–1	4–0	1–2	3–0
Dynamo Kyiv	1–0	4–0	2–1	—	0–1	2–0	0–1	3–0	2–1	4–2	4–0	3–0	3–0	3–0	5–0	4–1
Karpaty Lviv	2–0	1–0	0–0	2–1	—	2–1	1–0	4–1	1–1	4–1	1–0	1–1	2–0	3–1	2–1	0–0
Kryvbas Kryvyi Rih	0–0	1–1	0–2	0–1	2–2	—	1–2	0–0	2–1	2–1	2–1	0–1	2–2	3–0	3–2	4–0
Metalurh Donetsk	1–0	1–0	0–1	1–0	0–1	0–0	—	2–0	3–2	3–0	0–0	1–2	1–1	2–0	0–0	3–0
Metalurh Mariupol	2–0	2–1	2–0	0–2	0–0	1–1	0–0	—	4–2	+:-	0–3	0–5	3–0	3–1	2–5	0–0
Metalurh Zaporizhzhia	1–1	1–1	2–1	1–5	0–0	2–0	1–0	2–0	—	3–2	3–0	0–1	1–1	0–1	2–3	4–2
Nyva Ternopil	1–0	1–0	3–0	1–1	0–1	0–2	2–0	5–0	1–2	—	3–1	1–0	1–0	4–1	1–2	2–0
Prykarpattya Ivano-Frankivsk	1–1	2–0	1–4	0–3	0–0	1–2	0–1	2–0	2–2	1–1	—	0–2	2–0	3–2	4–0	4–1
Shakhtar Donetsk	4–1	2–1	2–0	0–0	2–1	1–1	2–0	2–2	3–1	5–0	4–1	—	1–0	4–0	3–2	3–2
Tavriya Simferopol	3–0	0–0	1–1	0–3	2–0	0–0	2–2	0–0	0–2	2–0	1–0	3–3	—	5–0	3–1	1–0
Torpedo Zaporizhzhia	2–2	0–1	2–2	0–3	0–2	0–3	1–1	1–1	1–1	0–1	2–2	0–0	4–3	—	1–2	0–1
Vorskla Poltava	1–0	2–1	2–1	1–4	0–0	2–0	2–0	0–2	1–2	2–1	0–0	0–3	1–0	2–0	—	2–0
Zirka-NIBAS Kirovohrad	2–3	2–1	1–3	1–3	1–0	3–0	1–0	1–1	1–0	2–0	1–1	0–0	2–1	1–0	0–1	—

Source: uafootball.net.ua
Legend: Blue = home team win; Yellow = draw; Red = away team win.

== Top goalscorers ==
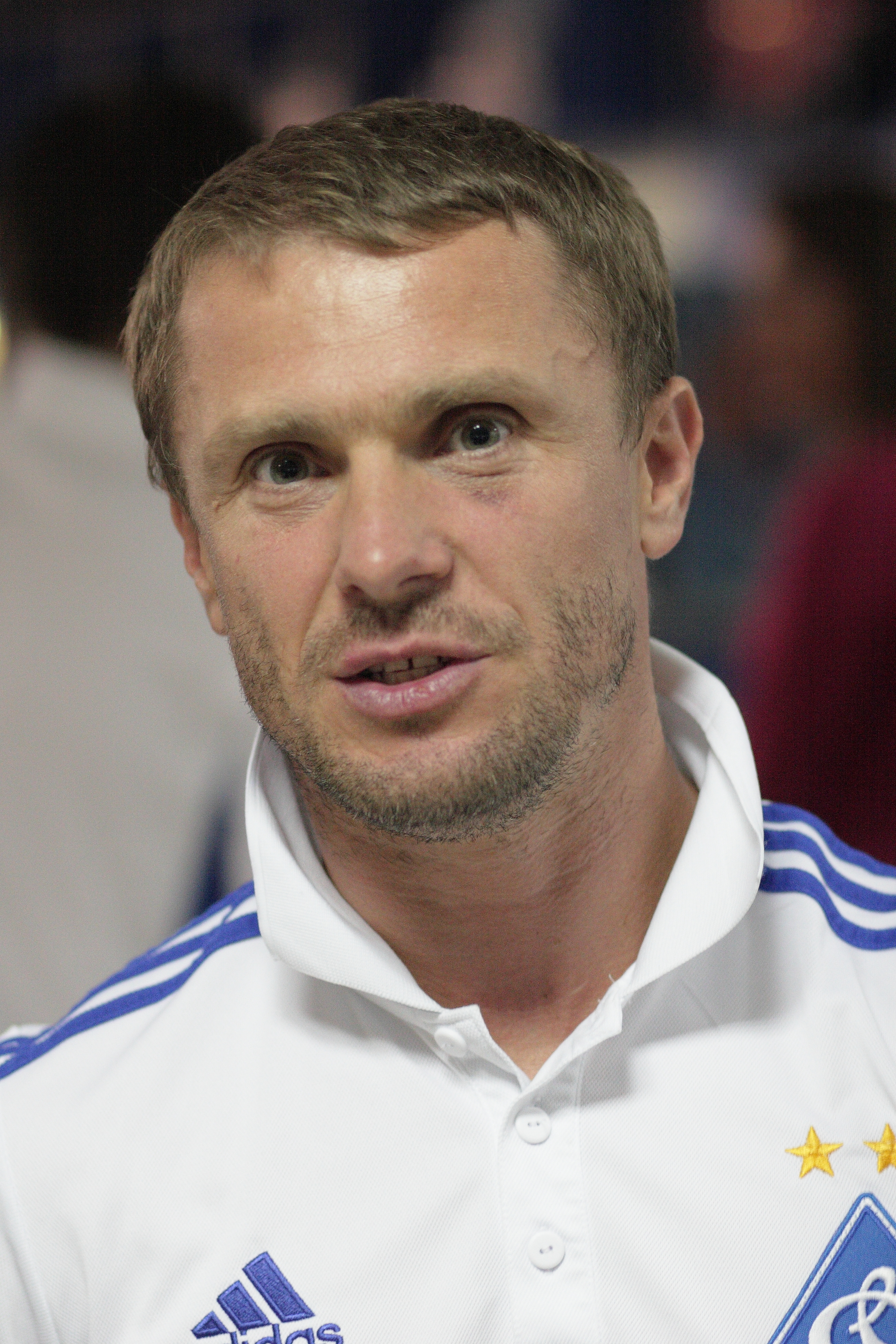
Serhii Rebrov

Rank	Player	Club	Goals (Pen.)
1	(Ukraine) Serhii Rebrov	Dynamo Kyiv	22 (5)
2	(Ukraine) Andriy Shevchenko	Dynamo Kyiv	21 (1)
3	(Ukraine) Oleksandr Palyanytsia	Karpaty Lviv	17 (2)
4	(Georgia (country)) Avtandil Kapanadze	Nyva Ternopil	15
5	(Ukraine) Oleksandr Haidash	Tavriya Simferopol	14
6	(Ukraine) Hennady Shchekotylin	Chornomorets Odesa	13 (1)
7	(Ukraine) Valeriy Kryventsov	Shakhtar Donetsk	11
8	(Ukraine) Petro Rusak	Spartak Ivano-Frankivsk	9
8	(Ukraine) Hennadiy Orbu	Shakhtar Donetsk	9 (1)
10	(Ukraine) Valentyn Platonov	Kryvbas Kryvyi Rih	9
10	(Ukraine) Vitaliy Mintenko	Metalurh Donetsk	9 (2)
10	(Ukraine) Volodymyr Haschyn	Kryvbas Kryvyi Rih	9 (3)

== See also ==
- 1997–98 Persha Liha
- 1997–98 Druha Liha
- 1997–98 Ukrainian Cup
