= Serhiy Nahornyak =

Ukrainian footballer and coach

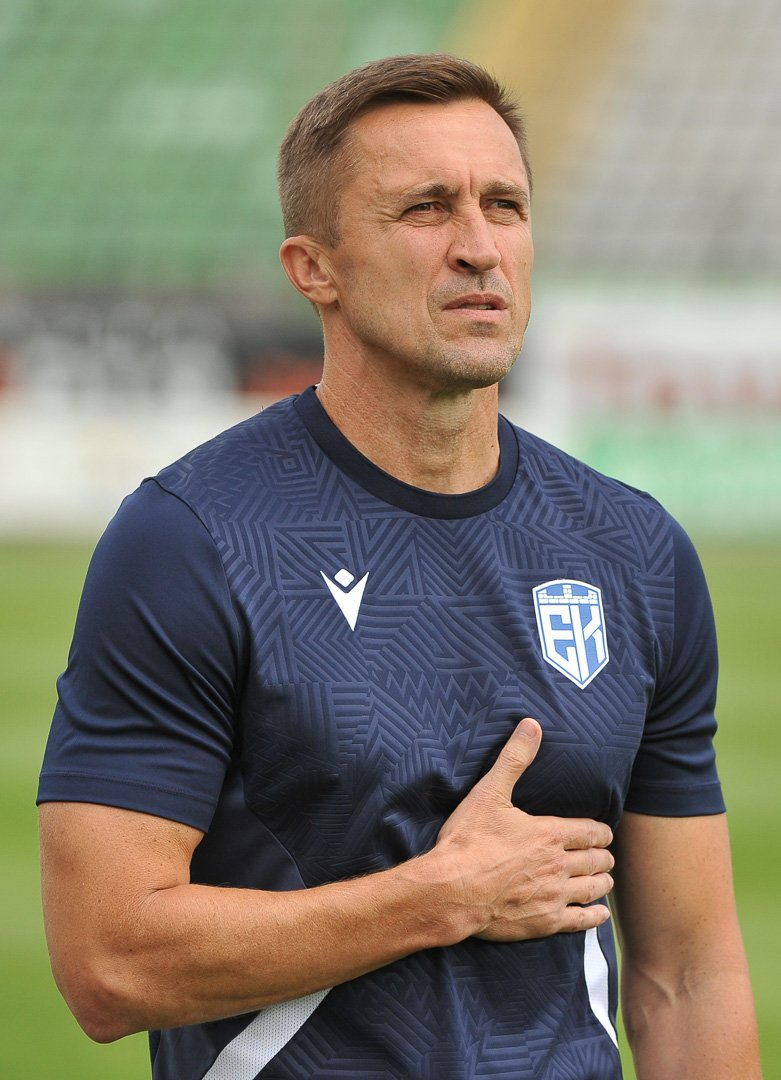

Personal information
- Full name: Serhiy Mykolayovych Nahornyak
- Date of birth: 5 September 1971 (age 55)
- Place of birth: Vinnytsia, Ukrainian SSR, Soviet Union
- Height: 1.86 m (6 ft 1 in)
- Positions: Midfielder; striker

Team information
- Current team: Epitsentr Kamianets-Podilskyi (manager)

Youth career
- Vinnytsia

Senior career*
Years	Team	Apps	(Gls)
1992–1993	Intehral Vinnytsia		(7)
1993	Vorskla Poltava	1	(0)
1993–1994	Nyva Vinnytsia	39	(9)
1993	→ Khimik Zhytomyr (loan)	4	(1)
1995	Spartak Moscow	10	(0)
1995–1998	Dnipro Dnipropetrovsk	60	(14)
1996	→ Spartak Moscow (loan)	2	(0)
1996	→ Metalurh Novomoskovsk (loan)	1	(2)
1999–2000	Shakhtar Donetsk	17	(3)
1999	→ Shakhtar-2 Donetsk	4	(0)
2000	Shenyang Haishi	26	(12)
2001–2003	Shandong Luneng	74	(18)
2004	Arsenal Kyiv	14	(1)
2004	Jiangsu Sainty	16	(3)
2005	Volyn Lutsk	15	(1)
2005–2006	Metalurh Zaporizhzhia	24	(3)
2007–2009	Irpin Horenychi		
Total		318	(82)

International career
1994–2002	Ukraine	14	(0)

Managerial career
- 2014–2016: Dnipro Dnipropetrovsk (assistant)
- 2019: Ukraine U19
- 2020: Ukraine U16
- 2021: Ukraine U17
- 2021–2022: Epitsentr Dunaivtsi (assistant)
- 2022: Ukraine U18
- 2022–2023: Ukraine U19
- 2022–: Epitsentr Kamianets-Podilskyi
- * Club domestic league appearances and goals

Serhiy Mykolayovych Nahornyak (Ukrainian: Сергій Миколайович Нагорняк; born 5 September 1971) is a Ukrainian professional football coach and former player.

== Club career ==
Nahornyak started his career at local amateur but well established football club Intehral playing at regional level. He made his debut at professional level in April 1993 in the Ukrainian First League for FC Vorskla Poltava playing against FC Avtomobilist Sumy. In the Ukrainian Premier League Nahornyak debuted for FC Nyva Vinnytsia on 8 August 1993 against FC Torpedo Zaporizhia.

In 1995 another Podolianyn Vyacheslav Hrozny invited him to FC Spartak Moscow, but Nahornyak struggled to stay in the first squad and later after dismissal of Hrozny from Spartak joined FC Dnipro Dnipropetrovsk, with which reached the 1997 Ukrainian Cup Final yielding the main trophy on penalties to FC Shakhtar Donetsk.

He played a game in the 1995–96 UEFA Champions League for FC Spartak Moscow in a 2:2 tie against FC Nantes Atlantique. Later Nahornyak also represented FC Dnipro and FC Shakhtar Donetsk in UEFA Europa League recording 5 games in total for this continental cup.

== Honours ==
=== As a Player ===
- Russian Premier League champion: 1996.
- Russian Cup finalist: 1996.
- Ukrainian Premier League runner-up: 1999.
- Ukrainian Premier League bronze: 1996, 1998.
- Ukrainian Cup finalist: 1997, 2006.

Individual

- Chinese FA Cup: Top Goalscorer: 2003

=== As a Coach ===
Individual

- SportArena Coach of the Round: 2025–26 (Round 9),
- Ukrainian Premier League Coach of the Round: 2025–26 (Round 9),
