= Oleh Matvyeyev =

Ukrainian footballer

Personal information
- Full name: Oleh Mykhaylovych Matvyeyev
- Date of birth: 18 August 1970 (age 56)
- Place of birth: Rostov-on-Don, RSFSR, Soviet Union
- Height: 1.74 m (5 ft 9 in)
- Position: Forward

Team information
- Current team: Shakhtar Donetsk U21 (assistant)

Senior career*
Years	Team	Apps	(Gls)
1987–1988	Rostselmash	36	(0)
1989–1992	Dynamo Kyiv	23	(1)
1992–2000	Shakhtar Donetsk	142	(61)
1996	→ Kremin Kremenchuk (loan)	16	(12)
1998–2000	→ Shakhtar-2 Donetsk	30	(19)
2000–2001	Metalurh Zaporizhzhia	28	(2)
2000–2001	→ Metalurh-2 Zaporizhzhia	4	(2)
2002	Metalurh Donetsk	14	(5)
2002	→ Metalurh-2 Donetsk	10	(2)
Total		303	(104)

International career
1987	Soviet Union U16		

Managerial career
- 2003–2010: Shakhtar Donetsk (scout)
- 2010–2012: Illichivets Mariupol (assistant)
- 2016–: Shakhtar Donetsk U21 (assistant)
- * Club domestic league appearances and goals

Oleh Mykhaylovych Matvyeyev (Ukrainian: Олег Михайлович Матвєєв; born 18 August 1970) is a Ukrainian former footballer.

== Career ==
One of the most successful strikers at the start of the Ukrainian Premier League. In 1997, he won the title of the League top scorer with 21 tallies. Together with Serhiy Atelkin they were the best tandem nationwide. Under the Soviet Union, Matvyeyev and Atelkin played in the Soviet Union U-16 football team. He is a staff member of FC Shakhtar Donetsk.

== Personal life ==
His son Kyrylo is also a professional football player.

== Career statistics ==
=== Club ===
Club	Season	League		Cup		Europe		Total	
Club	Season	Apps	Goals	Apps	Goals	Apps	Goals	Apps	Goals
Rostselmash	1987	4	0	-	-	-	-	4	0
Rostselmash	1988	32	0	1	0	-	-	33	0
Dynamo Kyiv	1991	13	0	2	0	1	0	16	0
Dynamo Kyiv	1992	10	1	3	0	2	0	15	1
Shakhtar	1992–93	27	11	2	0	-	-	29	11
Shakhtar	1993–94	27	17	1	3	-	-	28	20
Shakhtar	1994–95	24	3	9	5	1	0	34	8
Shakhtar	1995–96	9	1	-	-	2	1	11	2
Kremin	1995–96	16	12	3	0	-	-	19	12
Shakhtar	1996–97	25	21	5	2	-	-	30	23
Shakhtar	1997–98	1	0	-	-	-	-	1	0
Shakhtar	1998–99	17	7	6	5	1	0	24	12
Shakhtar	1999–00	12	1	1	1	2	0	15	2
Metalurh Z	2000–01	20	2	2	1	-	-	22	3
Metalurh Z	2001–02	8	0	1	0	-	-	9	0
Metalurh D	2001–02	10	5	-	-	-	-	10	5
Metalurh D	2002–03	4	0	2	0	-	-	6	0
Total for Shakhtar		142	61	24	16	6	1	172	78
Career totals		259	81	38	17	9	1	306	99
