= Ihor Petrov =

Ukrainian footballer

Personal information
- Full name: Ihor Hryhorovych Petrov
- Date of birth: 30 January 1964 (age 62)
- Place of birth: Horlivka, Soviet Union (now Ukraine)
- Height: 1.74 m (5 ft 9 in)
- Positions: Midfielder; striker

Senior career*
Years	Team	Apps	(Gls)
1981–1991	Shakhtar Donetsk	223	(52)
1991–1993	Beitar Tel Aviv	63	(20)
1993–1994	Maccabi Ironi Ashdod	34	(8)
1994–1996	Shakhtar Donetsk	53	(18)
1996–1998	Metalurh Donetsk	48	(7)
1997	→ Metalurh-2 Donetsk	2	(1)
1998	Shakhtar Donetsk	5	(0)
1998	→ Shakhtar-2 Donetsk	8	(2)
Total		436	(108)

International career
1994	Ukraine	3	(0)

Managerial career
- 1998–1999: Shakhtar (staff)
- 2005–2012: Olimpik Donetsk
- 2012–2013: Slavutych Cherkasy (assistant)
- 2013: Slavutych Cherkasy
Medal record
Men's football
Representing Soviet Union
UEFA European U-19 Championships
Bronze medal – third place	1982 Finland
- * Club domestic league appearances and goals

Ihor Hryhorovych Petrov (Ukrainian: Ігор Григорович Петров; born 30 January 1964) is a Ukrainian professional football manager and former player.

== Playing career ==
In 1983 Petrov took part in the Summer Spartakiad of the Peoples of the USSR in the team of Ukrainian SSR.

== Managing career ==
In 2012, he received the UEFA Pro Licence.

In 2015 Petrov became a president of the Donetsk People's Republic Football Union.

== Career statistics ==
=== Club ===
Club	Season	League		Cup		Europe		Super Cup		Total	
Club	Season	Apps	Goals	Apps	Goals	Apps	Goals	Apps	Goals	Apps	Goals
Shakhtar	1982	24	6	4	2	-	-	-	-	28	8
Shakhtar	1983	9	1	3	0	3	0	-	-	15	1
Shakhtar	1984	30	3	4	0	1	0	1	0	36	3
Shakhtar	1985	20	1	1	0	-	-	-	-	21	1
Shakhtar	1986	29	12	2	0	-	-	-	-	31	12
Shakhtar	1987	20	4	4	1	-	-	-	-	24	5
Shakhtar	1988	23	10	3	2	-	-	-	-	26	12
Shakhtar	1989	22	6	3	1	-	-	-	-	25	7
Shakhtar	1990	23	4	4	2	-	-	-	-	27	6
Shakhtar	1991	23	5	-	-	-	-	-	-	23	5
Beitar	1991-92	31	10	-	-	-	-	-	-	31	10
Beitar	1992-93	32	10	-	-	-	-	-	-	32	10
Maccabi	1993-94	34	8	-	-	-	-	-	-	34	8
Shakhtar	1994–95	28	14	7	3	2	2	-	-	37	19
Shakhtar	1995–96	25	4	4	1	4	0	-	-	33	5
Metalurh D	1996–97	39	7	3	0	-	-	-	-	42	7
Metalurh D	1997–98	9	0	-	-	-	-	-	-	9	0
Shakhtar	1997–98	5	0	-	-	-	-	-	-	5	0
Total for Shakhtar		281	70	39	12	10	2	1	0	331	84
Career totals		426	105	42	12	10	2	1	0	479	119

== Honours ==
- Soviet Cup winner: 1983
- Soviet Cup finalist: 1986
- Ukrainian Cup winner: 1995
