= Andriy Polunin =

Ukrainian footballer (1971–2025)

Personal information
- Full name: Andriy Viktorovych Polunin
- Date of birth: 5 March 1971
- Place of birth: Dnipropetrovsk, Ukrainian SSR, USSR
- Date of death: 15 November 2025 (aged 54)
- Place of death: Lutsk, Ukraine
- Height: 1.72 m (5 ft 8 in)
- Position: Midfielder

Youth career
- 1981–1988: Dnipropetrovsk OShISP (UOR)

Senior career*
Years	Team	Apps	(Gls)
1989	Shakhtar Pavlohrad	1	(0)
1990–1996	Dnipro Dnipropetrovsk	152	(23)
1997	CSKA Kyiv	14	(0)
1997	Karpaty Lviv	14	(1)
1998	Kryvbas Kryvyi Rih	9	(2)
1998–1999	1. FC Nürnberg	16	(2)
1999–2000	FC St. Pauli	29	(4)
2000–2002	Rot-Weiss Essen	28	(1)
2002–2003	Dnipro Dnipropetrovsk	6	(0)
2002–2003	→ Dnipro-2 Dnipropetrovsk	3	(0)
2003–2004	Kryvbas Kryvyi Rih	1	(0)

International career
1992–1995	Ukraine	9	(1)

Managerial career
- 2007: Kryvbas Kryvyi Rih (scout)
- 2007–2008: Naftovyk-Ukrnafta (sports director)
- 2008: Naftovyk-Ukrnafta (president)
- 2008–2012: Naftovyk-Ukrnafta (sports director)
- 2012: Arsenal Kyiv (director)
- 2013–2018: Naftovyk-Ukrnafta (sports director)
- * Club domestic league appearances and goals

Andriy Viktorovych Polunin (Ukrainian: Андрій Вікторович Полунін; 5 March 1971 – 15 November 2025) was a Ukrainian professional footballer who played as a midfielder.

== Career ==
Polunin made his professional debut in the Soviet Second League in 1989 for Shakhtar Pavlohrad.

He spent the majority of his playing career at Dnipro Dnipropetrovsk. He won nine caps for Ukraine, scoring one goal, in a 3–1 defeat to Italy in a Euro 96 qualifier in Bari in November 1995.

From 2007, Polunin worked as a sports director with Naftovyk-Ukrnafta.

== Death ==
Polunin died on 15 November 2025, at the age of 54, having suffered a heart attack after playing in a veterans' match in Lutsk.
