= Oleksandr Holokolosov (footballer, born 1976) =

Ukrainian footballer

Personal information
- Full name: Oleksandr Oleksandrovych Holokolosov
- Date of birth: 28 January 1976 (age 50)
- Place of birth: Odesa, Soviet Union
- Height: 1.82 m (5 ft 11 1/2 in)
- Position: Striker

Senior career*
Years	Team	Apps	(Gls)
1993–1994	Dynamo-2 Kyiv	50	(0)
1995	Nyva Vinnytsia	23	(6)
1996	Dynamo-3 Kyiv	12	(6)
1997	Verkhovyna Uzhhorod	8	(5)
1997–1998	Kerametal Dubnica	13	(7)
1999–2000	Chornomorets Odesa	26	(15)
1999	→ Chornomorets-2 Odesa	4	(0)
2000	→ Volyn Lutsk (loan)	10	(0)
2000–2002	Albacete	18	(0)
2002–2003	Dubnica	7	(1)
- * Club domestic league appearances and goals

Oleksandr Oleksandrovych Holokolosov (Ukrainian: Олександр Голоколосов, born 28 January 1976) is a former Ukrainian footballer.

Since 2006 Holokolosov worked as a scout for various clubs of the Ukrainian Premier League.
