= Borys Finkel =

Ukrainian footballer

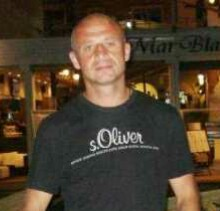

Personal information
- Full name: Borys Arkadiyovych Finkel
- Date of birth: 2 February 1968 (age 58)
- Place of birth: Chernivtsi, Ukrainian SSR
- Height: 1.79 m (5 ft 10 in)
- Position: Striker

Senior career*
Years	Team	Apps	(Gls)
1986	Bukovyna Chernivtsi	14	(0)
1988	Zaria Bălți	9	(0)
1990	Bukovyna Chernivtsi	11	(2)
1991	Halychyna Drohobych	12	(3)
1992–1994	Bukovyna Chernivtsi	78	(21)
1994–1995	Dnipro Dnipropetrovsk	29	(9)
1995–1997	Bukovyna Chernivtsi	70	(31)
1997–1998	Nyva Vinnytsia	59	(22)
1999	Bukovyna Chernivtsi	16	(2)
1999–2000	Cherkasy	23	(8)
2000–2005	Amberg		
2005–2011	Gärbershof		
2011–2012	Utzenhofen		

International career
1994	Ukraine	4	(1)
- * Club domestic league appearances and goals

Borys Arkadiyovych Finkel (Ukrainian: Борис Аркадійович Фінкель; born 2 February 1968) is a Ukrainian retired professional footballer.

== Career statistics ==
=== International goals ===
No.	Date	Venue	Opponent	Score	Result	Competition
1	26 August 1994	Municipal Stadium, Grassau, Germany	United Arab Emirates	1–1	1–1	Friendly match
