= Volodymyr Bahmut =

Ukrainian footballer and coach (born 1962)

Personal information
- Full name: Volodymyr Mykolayovych Bahmut
- Date of birth: 21 January 1962 (age 64)
- Place of birth: Dniprodzerzhynsk, Ukrainian SSR
- Height: 1.78 m (5 ft 10 in)
- Position: Midfielder

Team information
- Current team: Dnipro (assistant)

Senior career*
| Years | Team | Apps | (Gls) |
| 1979–1983 | Metalurh Dniprodzerzhynsk | 141 | (14) |
| 1983–1992 | Dnipro Dnipropetrovsk | 201 | (18) |
| 1993–1994 | Torpedo Zaporizhzhia | 24 | (5) |
| 1994–1996 | Dnipro Dnipropetrovsk | 75 | (7) |

Managerial career
- 1998–2005: Dnipro-2 Dnipropetrovsk (assistant)
- 2005–2017: Dnipro Dnipropetrovsk (youth teams assistant)
- 2017–: Dnipro (assistant)
- * Club domestic league appearances and goals

Volodymyr Mykolayovych Bahmut (Ukrainian: Володимир Миколайович Багмут; born 21 January 1962) is a Ukrainian professional football coach and a former player.

Currently, he is an assistant manager with FC Dnipro.

== Honours ==
Top awards

- Soviet Top League champion: 1983, 1988.
- Soviet Cup winner: 1989.
- USSR Super Cup winner: 1989.
- USSR Federation Cup winner: 1986, 1989.

Minor awards

- Soviet Top League runner-up: 1987, 1989.
- Soviet Top League bronze: 1984, 1985.
- USSR Federation Cup finalist: 1990.
- Ukrainian Premier League runner-up: 1993.
- Ukrainian Premier League bronze: 1992, 1995, 1996.

== European club competitions ==
With FC Dnipro Dnipropetrovsk.

- 1986–87 UEFA Cup: 2 games.
- 1988–89 UEFA Cup: 2 games.
- 1989–90 European Cup: 6 games.
- 1990–91 UEFA Cup: 2 games.
