= Hennadiy Shchekotylin =

Ukrainian footballer

Personal information
- Full name: Hennadiy Anatoliyovych Shchekotylin
- Date of birth: 28 July 1974 (age 52)
- Place of birth: Odesa, Ukrainian SSR
- Position: Midfielder

Youth career
- Odesa sports school #6
- Chornomorets Odesa academy

Senior career*
Years	Team	Apps	(Gls)
1991–1994	FC Chornomorets Odesa	0	(0)
1992–1994	→ FC Chornomorets-2 Odesa	111	(14)
1995	FC Naftokhimik Kremenchuk	34	(2)
1996–1997	FC SKA-Lotto Odesa	13	(2)
1997–1998	FC Chornomorets Odesa	41	(15)
1999–2002	FC Dynamo Kyiv	0	(0)
1999–2000	→ FC Dynamo-2 Kyiv	25	(4)
1999–2000	→ FC Dynamo-3 Kyiv	6	(0)
2000	→ FC CSKA-2 Kyiv (loan)	2	(0)
2001	→ FC Kryvbas Kryvyi Rih (loan)	8	(1)
2001–2002	→ FC Zakarpattia Uzhhorod (loan)	25	(4)
2002–2003	FC Chornomorets Odesa	15	(0)
2003	→ FC Chornomorets-2 Odesa	2	(0)
2003	→ MFC Mykolaiv (loan)	7	(1)
2004	FC Zakarpattia Uzhhorod	5	(1)
2004	PFC Oleksandriya	13	(1)
2005–2006	MFC Mykolaiv	36	(7)
2006	FK Šiauliai	12	(2)
2007	FC Ivan Odesa		
2007–2008	FC Vostok	5	(0)
2014	FC Khadzhybei Usatove	9	(1)

International career
1995	Ukraine (students)		

Managerial career
- 2009–2012: FC Odesa (assistant)
- * Club domestic league appearances and goals

Hennadiy Anatoliyovych Shchekotylin (Ukrainian: Геннадій Анатолійович Щекотилін, romanized: Hennadii Anatoliiovych Shchekotylin; born 28 July 1974) is a retired Ukrainian professional footballer.
