= Valentyn Moskvin =

Ukrainian footballer

Valentyn Moskvin Валентин Москвін
Personal information
- Full name: Valentyn Arturovych Moskvin
- Date of birth: 4 May 1968 (age 58)
- Place of birth: Ivano-Frankivsk, Ukrainian SSR
- Height: 1.73 m (5 ft 8 in)
- Position: Striker

Senior career*
Years	Team	Apps	(Gls)
1985–1988	Prykarpattya Ivano-Frankivsk	70	(14)
1988–1993	Dnipro Dnipropetrovsk	77	(9)
1993–1994	Hapoel Kfar Saba	26	(4)
1994–1996	Dnipro Dnipropetrovsk	38	(4)
1996–1997	Kryvbas Kryvyi Rih	22	(3)
1997–1998	Tysmenytsia	2	(0)

International career
1992	Ukraine	1	(0)
- * Club domestic league appearances and goals

Valentyn Arturovych Moskvin (Ukrainian: Валентин Артурович Москвін; born 4 May 1968) is a Ukrainian retired professional footballer. He made his professional debut in the Soviet Second League in 1985 for FC Prykarpattya Ivano-Frankivsk.

He scored the last goal of FC Dnipro Dnipropetrovsk in the Soviet Top League.

Moskvin made one appearance for the Ukraine national football team in 1992.

== Honours ==
- Ukrainian Premier League runner-up: 1993.
- Ukrainian Premier League bronze: 1992, 1995, 1996.
- Ukrainian Cup finalist: 1995.
