= Oleksandr Zakharov =

Ukrainian footballer

Personal information
- Full name: Oleksandr Volodymyrovych Zakharov
- Date of birth: 19 June 1966 (age 60)
- Height: 1.79 m (5 ft 10 1/2 in)
- Positions: Midfielder; defender

Youth career
- 1983: Tavriya Simferopol

Senior career*
Years	Team	Apps	(Gls)
1984	Tavriya Simferopol	23	(1)
1987–1991	Chayka Sevastopol	222	(30)
1992–1999	Naftovyk Okhtyrka	256	(46)
2000	Elektron Romny	11	(0)
2000–2001	SC Kherson	10	(1)
- * Club domestic league appearances and goals

Oleksandr Volodymyrovych Zakharov (Ukrainian: Олександр Володимирович Захаров; born 19 June 1966) is a Soviet and Ukrainian former professional footballer.

== Club career ==
He made his debut in the Soviet First League in 1984 for SC Tavriya Simferopol.
