= Oleksandr Babiy =

Uzbek footballer

Personal information
- Full name: Oleksandr Mykolayovych Babiy
- Date of birth: 9 July 1968 (age 58)
- Place of birth: Tashkent, Uzbek SSR
- Height: 1.77 m (5 ft 9 1/2 in)
- Positions: Defender; midfielder

Senior career*
Years	Team	Apps	(Gls)
1989	FC Podillya Khmelnytskyi	0	(0)
1991–1992	FC Temp Shepetivka	55	(4)
1992–1994	FC Nyva Ternopil	43	(5)
1994	FC Stal Alchevsk	15	(5)
1994–1995	FC Shakhtar Donetsk	29	(2)
1995	FC Torpedo Zaporizhia	4	(0)
1995–1996	FC Metalurh Zaporizhya	27	(4)
1997–1998	FC Shakhtar Donetsk	26	(3)
1997	→ FC Shakhtar-2 Donetsk	2	(0)
1998–1999	FC Zenit Saint Petersburg	44	(4)
2000	FC Stal Alchevsk	12	(2)
2000	→ FC Stal-2 Alchevsk	1	(0)
2001	FC Lokomotiv Nizhny Novgorod	16	(0)
2001	FC Arsenal Tula	15	(1)
- * Club domestic league appearances and goals

Oleksandr Mykolayovych Babiy (Ukrainian: Олександр Миколайович Бабій; Russian: Александр Николаевич Бабий; born 9 July 1968) is an Uzbek retired professional footballer. He made his professional debut in the Soviet Second League B in 1991 for FC Temp Shepetivka. He played 2 games in the UEFA Cup 1999–2000 for FC Zenit Saint Petersburg.

== Honours ==
- Ukrainian Cup winner: 1995, 1997.
- Russian Cup winner: 1999.
