= Hennadiy Orbu =

Ukrainian footballer

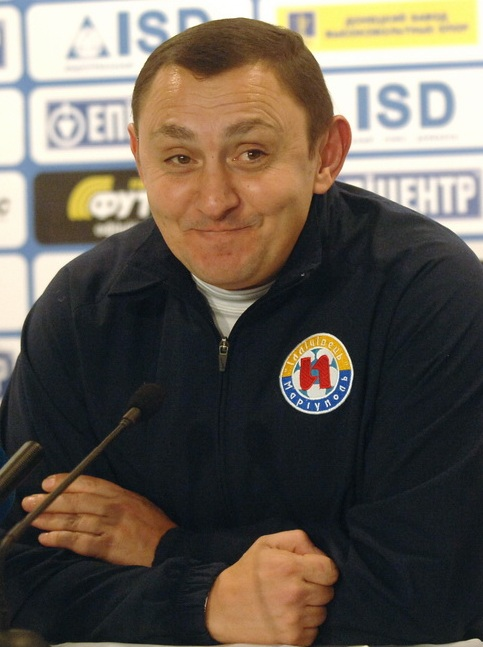

Personal information
- Full name: Hennadiy Hryhorovych Orbu
- Date of birth: 23 July 1970 (age 56)
- Place of birth: Makiivka, Ukrainian SSR
- Height: 1.72 m (5 ft 7 1/2 in)
- Position: Midfielder

Team information
- Current team: Kyzyltash Bakhchisaray (manager)

Senior career*
Years	Team	Apps	(Gls)
1992	Bazhanovets Makiivka	20	(7)
1993–1996	Shakhtar Donetsk	107	(12)
1996–1997	Rotor Volgograd	21	(2)
1997–2000	Shakhtar Donetsk	86	(27)
1997–2000	→ Shakhtar-2 Donetsk	14	(4)
2000	Vorskla Poltava	3	(1)
2001–2002	Sokol Saratov	37	(2)

International career
1994–1997	Ukraine	17	(0)

Managerial career
- 2003–2009: Shakhtar Donetsk (staff)
- 2009–2010: Zorya Luhansk (assistant)
- 2010–2012: Illichivets Mariupol (assistant)
- 2013: Shakhtar Donetsk (reserve)
- 2013: Sevastopol (reserve)
- 2013: Sevastopol (caretaker)
- 2013: Sevastopol
- 2014: Daugava
- 2017–2019: Mariupol (U19)
- 2022–2024: Kolkheti-1913 Poti (assistant)
- 2024: Zvezda St. Petersburg
- 2025–2026: Gvardiya Feodosia
- 2026–: Kyzyltash Bakhchisaray
- * Club domestic league appearances and goals

Hennadiy Hryhorovych Orbu (Ukrainian: Геннадій Григорович Орбу; born 23 July 1970) is a Ukrainian professional football coach and a former player who is the manager of Kyzyltash Bakhchisaray.

== Playing career ==
He made his professional debut in the Ukrainian Premier League in 1991 for Shakhtar Donetsk. He played 7 games and scored 1 goal in the UEFA Intertoto Cup 1996 for Rotor Volgograd.

It was in this team that Orbu began his professional career in the Second League in 1992. In the fall of the same year, he was invited to Shakhtar Donetsk, where he played for four seasons, playing 106 matches in the Ukrainian top flight and scoring 12 goals.

== Career statistics ==
=== Club ===
Club	Season	League		Cup		Europe		Total	
Club	Season	Apps	Goals	Apps	Goals	Apps	Goals	Apps	Goals
Bazhanovets	1992	14	5	-	-	-	-	14	1
Bazhanovets	1992–93	6	2	1	0	-	-	7	2
Shakhtar	1992–93	18	0	1	0	-	-	19	0
Shakhtar	1993–94	32	2	4	1	-	-	36	3
Shakhtar	1994–95	30	3	8	0	2	1	40	4
Shakhtar	1995–96	27	7	4	0	4	2	35	9
Rotor	1996	20	2	-	-	7	1	27	3
Rotor	1997	1	0	-	-	-	-	1	0
Shakhtar	1996–97	13	6	1	0	-	-	14	6
Shakhtar	1997–98	29	9	4	1	6	2	39	12
Shakhtar	1998–99	20	5	2	0	4	2	26	7
Shakhtar	1999–00	22	7	2	1	3	0	27	8
Shakhtar	2000–01	2	0	-	-	-	-	2	0
Vorskla	2000–01	3	1	-	-	2	0	5	1
Sokol	2001	26	2	2	0	-	-	28	2
Sokol	2002	11	0	2	0	-	-	13	0
Total for Shakhtar		193	39	26	3	19	7	238	49
Career totals		274	51	31	3	28	8	333	62

== Honours ==
- Ukrainian Premier League runner-up: 1997, 1998, 1999, 2000, 2001.
- Russian Premier League runner-up: 1997.
- Russian Premier League bronze: 1996.
- Ukrainian Cup winner: 1995, 1997.
