= Ihor Yavorskyi =

Ukrainian footballer and manager

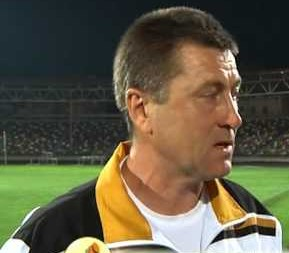
- Yavorskyi in 2012

Personal information
- Full name: Ihor Petrovych Yavorskyi
- Date of birth: 9 June 1959 (age 67)
- Place of birth: Murovane, Ukrainian SSR, Soviet Union (now Ukraine)
- Position: Striker

Senior career*
Years	Team	Apps	(Gls)
1977	FC Falcon Lviv		
1978–1981	FC Nyva Pidhaitsi		
1981	FC Kosmos Pavlohrad	21	(9)
1982	FC Metalist Kharkiv	1	(0)
1982–1984	FC Kosmos Pavlohrad	121	(35)
1985	FC Nyva Ternopil	38	(20)
1986	FC Metalist Kharkiv	8	(0)
1986–1987	FC Nyva Ternopil	70	(33)
1988	FC Guria Lanchkhuti	36	(6)
1989–1991	FC Nyva Ternopil	124	(83)
1991–1992	ŠK Futura Humenné		
1993	NK Veres Rivne	35	(9)
1994–1995	Boliden	21	(36)
1995–1997	FC Nyva Ternopil	40	(16)

Managerial career
- 1997–1998: FC Nyva Ternopil
- 1998: FC Nyva Vinnytsia
- 1999: FC Metalurh Donetsk
- 1999: FC Prykarpattya Ivano-Frankivsk
- 2000–2001: FC Nyva Ternopil
- 2009: FC Lviv
- 2012–2014: FC Nyva Ternopil
- 2015: Toronto Atomic FC
- 2016–2017: Nyva Terebovlya
- * Club domestic league appearances and goals

Ihor Petrovych Yavorskyi (Ukrainian: Ігор Петрович Яворський; born 9 June 1959) is a Ukrainian former footballer and football manager.

== Career ==
Yavorskyi began his career with FC Falcon Lviv in the Ukrainian amateur leagues. In 1978, he signed with FC Nyva Pidhaitsi of the Soviet Second League. During his career in the Soviet Union he played with FC Kosmos Pavlohrad, FC Metalist Kharkiv, FC Guria Lanchkhuti. In 1991, he played abroad in the Slovak National Football League with ŠK Futura Humenné, and returned home to play with NK Veres Rivne in the Ukrainian Premier League. He finished his career with Boliden in Sweden, and with Nyva Ternopil in 1997.

== Managerial career ==
He was appointed the head coach of PFC Nyva Ternopil in 1994. He managed several teams in the Premier League as FC Metalurh Donetsk, FC Prykarpattya Ivano-Frankivsk, and served as an assistant coach with FC Lviv, FC Karpaty Lviv, and Metalurh Donetsk. In 2015, he was appointed the inaugural head coach for Toronto Atomic FC in the Canadian Soccer League. Midway through the season he parted ways with Toronto.

In 2016, he managed Nyva Terebovlya in the Ukrainian Amateur Football Championship. In 2017, he announced his resignation from Nyva.

== Honors ==
=== Individual ===
- Football Championship of the Ukrainian SSR Top scorer: 1989
