= Ihor Leonov =

Ukrainian footballer and coach

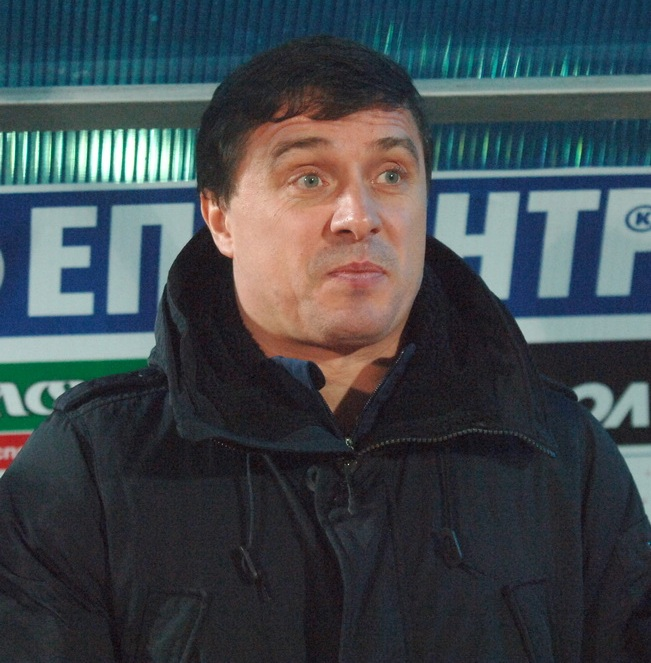

Personal information
- Full name: Ihor Ivanovych Leonov
- Date of birth: 14 September 1967 (age 59)
- Place of birth: Kerch, Soviet Union (now Ukraine)
- Height: 1.78 m (5 ft 10 in)
- Position: Midfielder

Senior career*
| Years | Team | Apps | (Gls) |
| 1983–1984 | Ocean Kerch | 22 | (4) |
| 1984–1988 | Tavriya Simferopol | 117 | (24) |
| 1988–1991 | Shakhtar Donetsk | 96 | (6) |
| 1991–1992 | SKN St. Pölten | 9 | (1) |
| 1992 | Floridsdorfer AC | 11 | (6) |
| 1993–2000 | Shakhtar Donetsk | 153 | (4) |
| 1995–2000 | → Shakhtar-2 Donetsk | 37 | (13) |
| 1996 | → Kremin Kremenchuk (loan) | 13 | (1) |
| 2000 | → Metalurh Donetsk (loan) | 7 | (0) |
| 2001 | Zorya Luhansk | 1 | (1) |
| 2001 | Volgar-Gazprom Astrakhan | 16 | (0) |
| 2001 | Gazovik-Gazprom Izhevsk | 11 | (1) |
| 2002 | Monolit Kostyantynivka (amateurs) | 4 | (0) |
| Total | | 492 | (61) |

Managerial career
- 2006–2008: Shakhtar-3 Donetsk
- 2010–2011: Illichivets Mariupol (assistant)
- 2011–2012: Illichivets Mariupol (caretaker)
- 2018–2019: Shakhtar Donetsk (U-19 technical coach)
- 2019: Arsenal Kyiv
- 2021: Mynai
- 2022: Nyva Vinnytsia
- 2024: Aktobe (youth)
- 2024–2025: Aktobe
- * Club domestic league appearances and goals

Ihor Ivanovych Leonov (Ukrainian: Ігор Іванович Леонов; born 17 September 1967) is a Ukrainian professional football manager and a former midfielder.

On 6 October 2011 he was appointed as interim coach for Illichivets Mariupol after resignation of the next coach, Valeriy Yaremchenko.

== Honours ==
- Ukrainian Premier League: runner-up 4

1994, 1997, 1998, 1999

- Ukrainian Cup: 2

1995, 1997
