= 1998–99 Vyshcha Liha =

8th season of top-tier football league in Vyshcha Liha

Vyshcha Liha
- Season: 1998–99
- Champions: Dynamo Kyiv; 7th title
- Relegated: SC Mykolaiv
- Champions League: Dynamo Kyiv
- UEFA Cup: Karpaty Lviv; Shakhtar Donetsk; Kryvbas Kryvyi Rih
- Matches played: 240
- Top goalscorer: (18) Andriy Shevchenko (Dynamo)
- Biggest home win: Dynamo - Prykarpattia 7:0; Shakhtar - Mykolaiv 7:0
- Biggest away win: Metalist - Dynamo 1:6; Zirka - Dynamo 0:5
- Highest scoring: Shakhtar - Vorskla 7:3

The 1998–99 Vyshcha Liha season was the 8th top-level football club competition since its establishment and the 3rd since the establishment of the Professional Football League (PFL). FC Dynamo Kyiv were the defending champions.

== Teams ==
This season, the Vyshcha Liha remained at 16 teams.

=== Promotions ===
- SC Mykolaiv, the champion of the 1997–98 Ukrainian First League – (returning after absence of two seasons)
- Metalist Kharkiv, the third-place runner-up of the 1997–98 Ukrainian First League – (returning after absence of four seasons)

=== Relegated teams ===
- Torpedo Zaporizhia – relegated after seven seasons in the top flight.
- Chornomorets Odesa – relegated after 11 seasons in the top flight, including seven in Vyshcha Liha.

=== Location ===
Locations of teams home grounds in Ukrainian Premier League 1998-99

== Managers ==
Club	Coach	Replaced coach	Home stadium
FC Dynamo Kyiv	(Ukraine) Valery Lobanovsky		Dynamo Stadium
FC Shakhtar Donetsk	(Russia) Anatoliy Byshovets	(Ukraine) Valery Yaremchenko 18 games	Shakhtar Stadium
FC Kryvbas Kryvyi Rih	(Ukraine) Oleh Taran		Metalurh Stadium
FC Karpaty Lviv	(Ukraine) Stepan Yurchyshyn	(Ukraine) Myron Markevych the first half	Ukraina Stadium
FC Metalurh Mariupol	(Ukraine) Mykola Pavlov		Azovstal Stadium
FC Metalist Kharkiv	(Ukraine) Mykhailo Fomenko		Metalist Stadium
FC CSKA Kyiv	(Ukraine) Volodymyr Bezsonov		CSK ZSU Stadium
FC Metalurh Zaporizhia	(Ukraine) Myron Markevych	(Ukraine) Oleksandr Shtelin 17 games	Metalurh Stadium
SC Tavriya Simferopol	(Ukraine) Anatoliy Korobochka	(Ukraine) Viktor Hrachov the first half (Ukraine) Valery Petrov 13 games	Lokomotyv Stadium
FC Vorskla Poltava	(Ukraine) Anatoliy Konkov	(Ukraine) Oleksandr Dovbiy 6 games (Ukraine) Serhiy Sobetskyi 7 games	Vorskla Stadium; Politekhnik Stadium (Kremenchuk)
FC Zirka Kirovohrad	(Ukraine) Oleksandr Ischenko		Zirka Stadium
FC Dnipro Dnipropetrovsk	(Ukraine) Leonid Koltun	(Ukraine) Vadym Tyschenko 13 games (Ukraine) Volodymyr Kobzarev 7 games	Meteor Stadium
FC Nyva Ternopil	(Ukraine) Ihor Yurchenko		City Stadium
FC Metalurh Donetsk	(Ukraine) Mykhailo Sokolovskyi	(Ukraine) Volodymyr Onyschenko 7 games (Ukraine) Volodymyr Havrylov 8 games (Ukraine) Ihor Yavorskyi 7 games	Stalekanatchyk Stadium (Khartsyzk); Donetsk Metallurgical Factory Stadium
FC Prykarpattia Ivano-Frankivsk	(Ukraine) Ihor Yavorskyi	(Ukraine) Bohdan Blavatskiy 6 games (Ukraine) Anatoliy Boyko 6 games (Ukraine) Anatoliy Zayaev 14 games (Ukraine) Bohdan Blavatskiy 2 games	Rukh Stadium
SC Mykolaiv	vacant	(Ukraine) Anatoliy Konkov 12 games (Ukraine) Leonid Nikolaenko 3 games (Ukraine) Ivan Krasnetskyi 1 game	Central City Stadium

Notes: Games between Dynamo Kyiv and CSKA Kyiv were played at Republican Stadium.

=== Changes ===
Team	Outgoing head coach	Manner of departure	Date of vacancy	Table	Incoming head coach	Date of appointment	Table
FC Nyva Ternopil	(Ukraine) Leonid Ishchuk			pre-season	(Ukraine) Ihor Yurchenko		pre-season
FC CSKA Kyiv	(Ukraine) Serhiy Morozov			pre-season	(Ukraine) Volodymyr Bezsonov		pre-season

== League table ==
Pos	Team	Pld	W	D	L	GF	GA	GD	Pts	Qualification or relegation
1	Dynamo Kyiv (Note: Participant of the 1999 Ukrainian Cup Final) (C)	30	23	5	2	75	17	+58	74	Qualification to Champions League second qualifying round
2	Shakhtar Donetsk	30	20	5	5	70	25	+45	65	Qualification to UEFA Cup qualifying round
3	Kryvbas Kryvyi Rih	30	16	11	3	43	18	+25	59	Qualification to UEFA Cup qualifying round
4	Karpaty Lviv	30	15	10	5	54	34	+20	55	Qualification to UEFA Cup first round
5	Metalurh Mariupol	30	14	6	10	35	27	+8	48	
6	Metalist Kharkiv	30	14	5	11	31	32	−1	47	
7	CSKA Kyiv	30	11	10	9	37	35	+2	43	
8	Metalurh Zaporizhzhia	30	12	6	12	46	43	+3	42	
9	Tavriya Simferopol	30	10	7	13	33	39	−6	37	
10	Vorskla Poltava	30	10	5	15	36	43	−7	35	
11	Zirka Kirovohrad	30	9	7	14	31	40	−9	34	
12	Dnipro Dnipropetrovsk	30	9	5	16	28	46	−18	32	
13	Nyva Ternopil	30	8	7	15	29	41	−12	31	
14	Metalurh Donetsk	30	7	7	16	27	51	−24	28	
15	Prykarpattya Ivano-Frankivsk	30	6	6	18	24	59	−35	24	Qualification to relegation play-off
16	SC Mykolaiv (R)	30	2	6	22	18	67	−49	12	Relegated to Ukrainian First League

Source: uafootball.net.ua
(C) Champions; (R) Relegated

== Results ==
Home \ Away	CSK	DNI	DYN	KAR	KRY	MET	MDO	MTM	MZA	MYK	NVT	PRY	SHA	TAV	VOR	ZIR
CSKA Kyiv	—	1–0	0–4	3–3	1–2	2–1	2–1	1–1	1–0	2–0	0–0	1–2	0–1	3–0	2–1	0–0
Dnipro	0–1	—	0–1	0–2	2–1	0–0	5–1	1–0	1–4	2–1	4–0	0–0	1–2	1–0	2–0	1–1
Dynamo Kyiv	2–0	2–3	—	0–0	1–0	1–0	3–0	2–0	6–2	2–1	1–0	7–0	2–1	0–0	4–0	1–0
Karpaty Lviv	3–3	4–1	2–1	—	2–1	0–1	2–0	3–1	1–1	5–1	1–0	3–0	1–0	2–1	2–1	2–1
Kryvbas Kryvyi Rih	0–0	2–1	0–0	0–0	—	1–0	2–0	3–1	4–0	0–0	2–1	2–0	1–0	1–1	3–1	1–0
Metalist Kharkiv	1–0	2–0	1–6	3–1	0–0	—	1–0	0–1	1–0	0–0	2–1	1–0	1–1	1–0	2–4	3–0
Metalurh Donetsk	2–2	2–0	1–4	4–3	0–2	0–0	—	1–1	0–2	0–0	2–1	1–0	0–4	2–0	0–0	1–0
Metalurh Mariupol	1–1	0–1	1–2	4–2	0–0	2–0	0–0	—	4–2	3–0	1–0	2–1	0–1	2–0	1–0	0–0
Metalurh Zaporizhzhia	1–0	2–2	1–3	3–1	1–1	3–2	0–0	3–0	—	4–1	2–1	1–1	2–3	3–0	0–1	1–0
SC Mykolaiv	2–3	2–0	0–4	0–3	0–4	0–2	0–1	1–2	0–4	—	0–1	1–1	0–3	1–2	1–0	2–2
Nyva Ternopil	1–2	0–0	1–5	0–0	1–2	2–0	3–2	1–0	1–0	3–1	—	3–1	0–3	0–0	2–2	3–2
Prykarpattya Ivano-Frankivsk	2–4	3–0	0–1	0–2	2–2	1–2	2–1	0–3	0–0	2–1	1–1	—	1–3	0–2	1–0	1–0
Shakhtar Donetsk	1–0	6–0	0–0	1–1	1–1	3–1	4–2	1–0	2–1	7–0	1–1	6–1	—	2–0	7–3	1–2
Tavriya Simferopol	1–1	3–0	3–3	1–1	0–2	0–1	3–2	0–2	2–3	2–0	1–0	3–0	2–1	—	2–0	1–0
Vorskla Poltava	1–0	1–0	0–2	0–0	0–0	1–2	2–0	0–1	3–0	2–1	2–1	4–0	1–2	2–2	—	4–2
Zirka Kirovohrad	1–1	2–0	0–5	2–2	2–3	2–0	3–1	0–1	1–0	1–1	1–0	2–1	0–2	3–1	1–0	—

Source: uafootball.net.ua
Legend: Blue = home team win; Yellow = draw; Red = away team win.

== Top goalscorers ==
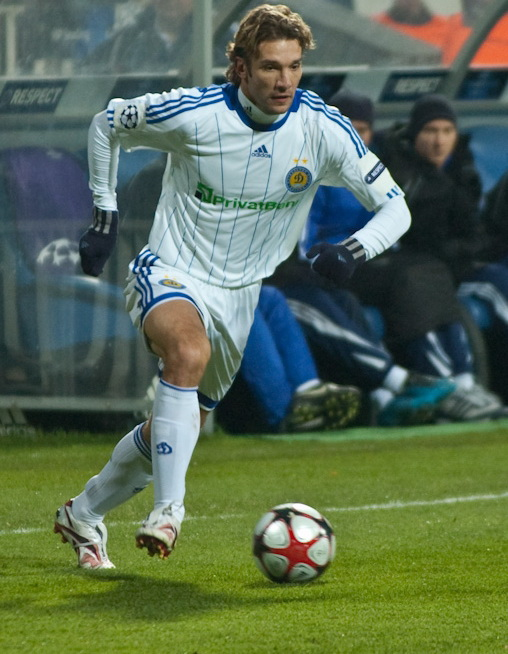
Andriy Shevchenko

Rank	Player	Club	Goals (Pen.)
1	(Ukraine) Andriy Shevchenko	Dynamo Kyiv	18 (1)
2	(Ukraine) Ivan Hetsko	Karpaty Lviv	16
2	(Ukraine) Oleksandr Palyanytsia	Karpaty Lviv	16 (5)
4	(Ukraine) Valentyn Poltavets	Metalurh Zaporizhzhya	13 (3)
5	(Ukraine) Andriy Vorobei	Shakhtar Donetsk	11
6	(Ukraine) Oleksiy Osipov	Tavriya Simferopol	11 (3)
7	(Belarus) Alexander Khatskevich	Dynamo Kyiv	10
8	(Ukraine) Oleksandr Haidash	Tavriya Simferopol	9
8	(Georgia (country)) Avtandil Kapanadze	Nyva Ternopil	9
8	(Ukraine) Ihor Kislov	Zirka Kirovohrad	9
8	(Ukraine) Ihor Kostiuk	Vorskla Poltava	9
8	(Ukraine) Vitaliy Pantilov	Metalurh Mariupol	9
8	(Ukraine) Serhii Rebrov	Dynamo Kyiv	9
8	(Ukraine) Yuriy Selezniov	Shakhtar Donetsk	9

Notable Transfers

- Andriy Shevchenko, FC Dynamo Kyiv to A.C. Milan
- Oleksandr Palyanytsia, FC Karpaty Lviv to FC Kryvbas Kryvyi Rih
- Ihor Kostiuk, FC Vorskla Poltava to FC Dynamo-2 Kyiv
