= Oleksandr Palyanytsya =

Ukrainian footballer

Personal information
- Date of birth: 29 February 1972 (age 54)
- Place of birth: Zhytomyr, Ukrainian SSR
- Position: Striker

Senior career*
Years	Team	Apps	(Gls)
1990–1992	Dnipro Dnipropetrovsk	12	(2)
1992	Kryvbas Kryvyi Rih	3	(0)
1993–1994	Veres Rivne	55	(11)
1995–1996	Dnipro Dnipropetrovsk	45	(19)
1996	Karpaty Lviv	2	(0)
1996–1997	LASK Linz	26	(6)
1997	Dnipro Dnipropetrovsk	12	(6)
1997	→ Dnipro-2 Dnipropetrovsk	1	(1)
1998–1999	Karpaty Lviv	44	(27)
1998	→ Karpaty-2 Lviv	4	(1)
1999–2000	Kryvbas Kryvyi Rih	40	(7)
2000	→ Kryvbas-2 Kryvyi Rih	2	(2)
2001–2003	Metalist Kharkiv	48	(7)
2001–2002	→ Metalist-2 Kharkiv	7	(6)
2004	Spartak Sumy	16	(6)

International career
1995–1999	Ukraine	2	(0)
- * Club domestic league appearances and goals

Oleksandr Palyanytsya (born 29 February 1972) is a Ukrainian former footballer.
