= Valeriy Kryventsov =

Ukrainian footballer and manager

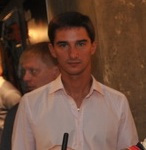

Personal information
- Full name: Valeriy Serhiyovych Kryventsov
- Date of birth: 30 July 1973 (age 53)
- Place of birth: Donetsk, Ukrainian SSR
- Height: 1.77 m (5 ft 10 in)
- Position: Defender

Senior career*
Years	Team	Apps	(Gls)
1991–2001	Shakhtar Donetsk	224	(49)
1992, 1998–2001	→ Shakhtar-2 Donetsk	44	(8)
2001–2002	Metalurh Donetsk	12	(1)
2001–2002	→ Metalurh-2 Donetsk	9	(1)
2003	Volyn Lutsk	14	(2)
2003–2004	Aktobe	30	(5)
2005–2006	Metalurh Zaporizhya	13	(1)
Total		346	(67)

International career
1993–1996	Ukraine U21	9	(0)
1994–1998	Ukraine	17	(0)

Managerial career
- 2007–2012: Shakhtar Donetsk (youth)
- 2012–2015: Shakhtar Donetsk (U-19)
- 2015–2016: Illichivets Mariupol
- 2016–2019: Shakhtar Donetsk (U-21)
- 2020–2022: Metalist 1925 Kharkiv
- 2023: Zorya Luhansk
- 2024: Bukovyna Chernivtsi
- 2026–: Ukraine (women) (assistant)
- * Club domestic league appearances and goals

Valeriy Kryventsov (Ukrainian: Валерій Сергійович Кривенцов; born 30 July 1973 in Donetsk) is a retired Ukrainian professional footballer, who is a manager.

He made his professional debut in the Ukrainian Premier League in 1991 for FC Shakhtar Donetsk.

== Coaching career ==
He began his coaching career in 2007 at Shakhtar's children's academy. In the 2014/15 season, Shakhtar U-19 won silver medals in the UEFA Youth League under his leadership, losing to Chelsea in the final match with a score of 2-3.

In the summer of 2015, he became the head coach of Illichivets Mariupol. In June 2016, he took charge of Shakhtar U-21.

On 21 August 2020 he was appointed head coach of Metalist 1925 Kharkiv. In the 2020/21 season, the Kharkiv team took 3rd place in the first league and reached the Premier League. In total, under the leadership of Kryventsov's coaching staff, Metalist 1925 played 53 matches, winning 21 and losing as many, with 11 more matches ending in a draw. On 22 October 2022 the Yellow and Blues terminated their cooperation with the coach.

On 9 September 2023 Kryventsov took over Zorya (Luhansk), but the team performed extremely poorly and left the team on November 11. Under his leadership, the team lost 5 times in 11 matches, drew three times and won the same number of matches.

== Career statistics ==
=== International ===
Appearances and goals by national team and year
National team	Year	Apps	Goals
Ukraine	1994	2	0
Ukraine	1995	–	
Ukraine	1996	5	0
Ukraine	1997	6	0
Ukraine	1998	4	0
Total		17	0

== Honours ==
- Ukrainian Premier League runner-up: 1994, 1997, 1998, 1999, 2000, 2001.
- Ukrainian Cup winner: 1995, 1997, 2001.
