= Klasychne derby =

Ukrainian football rivalry between Dynamo Kyiv and Shakhtar Donetsk

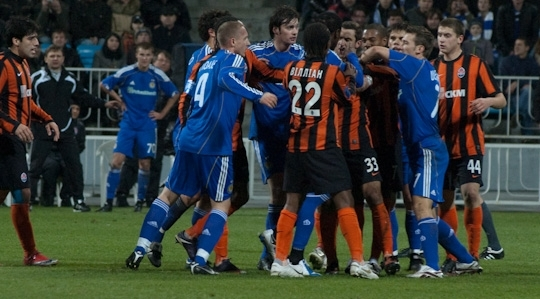
- A Ukrainian classico brawl in 2009
- Other names: Ukrainian derby
- Location: Ukraine
- Teams: Dynamo Kyiv; Shakhtar Donetsk
- Latest meeting: Shakhtar 0–0 Dynamo; 2026–27 Ukrainian Premier League (8 November 2026)
- Next meeting: TBC
- Stadiums: Olympiyskiy NSC (Note: Shakhtar is forced to play away from home due to the Russo-Ukrainian War.)

Statistics
- Total meetings: 205 (total official matches)
- Most wins: Domestic league: Dynamo (66); Domestic cup: Shakhtar (12); Other domestic tourneys: Dynamo (20); International cup: Shakhtar (1); Total wins: Dynamo (87)
- Regular season series: 159 (domestic league matches)
- Largest victory: Shakhtar 6–0 Dynamo; Soviet Top League (26 July 1950)

Klasychne derby (Ukrainian: Класичне, as Classico), or the Ukrainian football rivalry is the football match between the two top Ukrainian clubs Dynamo Kyiv and Shakhtar Donetsk. The game between those two clubs is a focal point of each football season in Ukraine. Due to war, at least three of their scheduled fixtures were scratched in 1941 and 2014. Since 2014, Shakhtar sometimes plays in Kyiv due to the Russian aggression which technically turned the rivalry into a city derby.

Dynamo and Shakhtar were the top Ukrainian clubs since introduction of the Soviet professional football competitions in 1936. They played against each other as early as 1931 when Donetsk was represented by the Shakhtar's direct predecessor Dynamo Stalino. Participating in competition dominated with the Russian teams, matchups between both teams was not too important within the Soviet Union. Following independence, the rivalry between them two grew into a national-level rivalry sometime after 1996 since the teams were two main contenders for the national title.

In 1970 and 1980s, rivalries between Dynamo Kyiv against FC Zorya Luhansk and FC Dnipro were somewhat notable eclipsing for short while the Donetsk-Kyiv stand-off. Dnipro, that returned to the Soviet Top League in 1981, won two Soviet titles in the 1980s and almost became a Ukrainian champion in the 1992–93 season.

During the times of the Soviet Union, the Ukrainian rivalry was overshadowed by the rivalry between Dynamo Kyiv and Spartak Moscow (see Spartak Moscow–Dynamo Kyiv rivalry) that has developed sometime in the 1960s.

== Formation of the derby ==
Locations of the two teams (since 2016 Shakhtar plays in Kyiv due to the War in Donbas)

=== Soviet Union ===
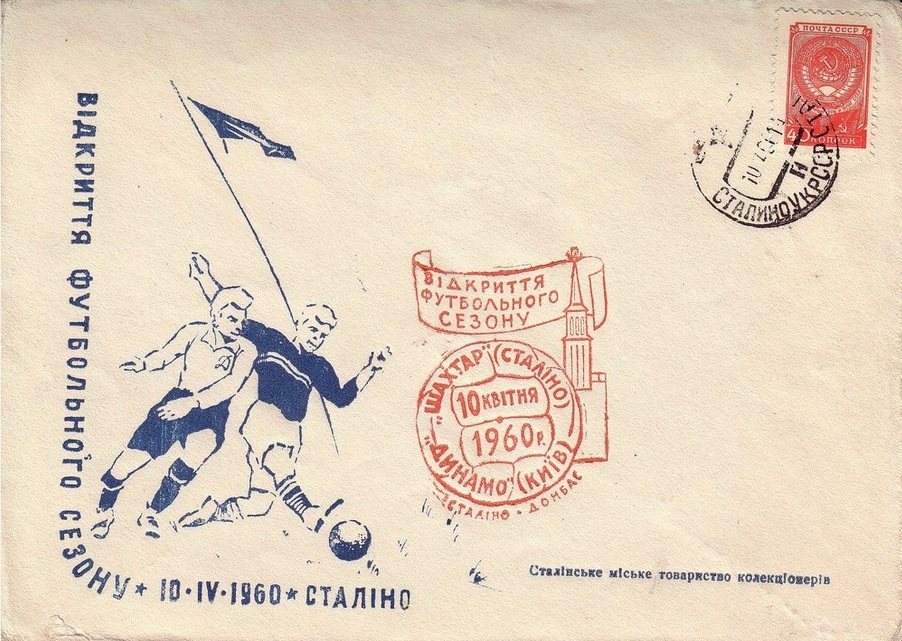
Cover of the Soviet Union. Opening day of the 1960 Soviet Top League season.

The two clubs first met back in 1938 in Kyiv in the Soviet Top League with Dynamo winning it 2–0. At the time, Dynamo Kyiv was the main representative of Ukraine in the Soviet League, while Shakhtar initially had some difficulties to secure their place there. The Donetsk team, however, was considered to be the main representative of the Ukrainian SSR other than Dynamo, representing the most industrialized and heavily urbanized Donbas region in the eastern part of Ukraine. In a few occasions Shakhtar even managed to place higher than the Dynamo's "Capitals" in League, but for most of the time Dynamo had more success head-to-head. Their meetings were not as popular in the Soviet League outside of Ukraine as the Moscow – Kyiv face off particularly between Dynamo and Spartak.

=== Ukraine ===
==== The 1990s: Dynamo's dominance ====
The trend of Dynamo's total dominance continued well after the establishment of the Ukrainian Vyshcha Liha (which eventually became the Ukrainian Premier League). For several seasons Shakhtar was not even among the main contenders for the league title, which was often contested by either FC Dnipro or Chornomorets Odesa. Dynamo won every single league title in the 1990s except one, when SC Tavriya Simferopol managed to pull off an upset, winning the inaugural Ukrainian league season, with Dynamo taking the silver medals, and Shakhtar finishing fourth.

In 1996, Rinat Akhmetov became Shakhtar's president and started investing heavily into the club. Shakhtar became relevant again, placing 2nd in 1996–97, and not finishing below 2nd place in the league ever since. In an interview to Vatsko Live (Russian: Вацко Live), former Shakhtar player Andriy Vorobey said that at least since 1997 it was cultivated at Shakhtar that Dynamo is not just an opponent, but rather the enemy.

==== The 2000s: rise of Shakhtar ====
It was not until the early 2000s when this fixture obtained the status of a true "derby". In the first years of the decade, Dynamo were still riding the wave of their late 1990s success, when they reached the UEFA Champions League quarterfinals and semi-finals in consecutive seasons. After the death of their legendary manager Valeriy Lobanovskyi in 2002, Dynamo's success in the European and Ukrainian competitions began to decline. This coincided with the continued rise of Shakhtar, who won their first Ukrainian league title in 2001–02, which took the rivalry between the two clubs to a whole new level. In the 2008–09 season, the Ukrainian derby was contested in European competition for the first time. Shakhtar defeated Dynamo in a 2008–09 UEFA Cup semi-final and then became the first side in the sovereign Ukraine era to win a European competition.

==== The 2010s ====
During the 2015–16 Ukrainian Premier League, on 16 October, Shakhtar Donetsk beat FC Dynamo Kyiv 0–3 in Kyiv and set two new records. One record was that for the first time during a Ukrainian derby game in Kyiv a team scored three goals. The other record was that for the first time Shakhtar had more Ukrainian derby victories, 26, than Dynamo. On 1 May 2016, in the second Premier League match between them at Arena Lviv, Shakhtar won 3–0 again, making it the first time when Dynamo loses two derby matches one after another with a margin of at least 3 goals. Despite all that, Dynamo became the champions that season.

== Venues ==
As of recently, both Dynamo and Shakhtar play at the Olympiyskiy National Sports Complex in Kyiv. Olympiskyi NSC has been one of Dynamo's two home stadiums since 1951 (the other one being the much smaller Valeriy Lobanovskyi Dynamo Stadium). Shakhtar, on the other hand, for the longest time (1938–2001) played at their older Central Stadium "Shakhtar" in Donetsk. In 2008 Shakhtar built new modern stadium Donbas Arena of UEFA elite class, but was forced to leave Donetsk in 2014 due to War in Donbas. Since then, Shakhtar has been based in Kyiv, but until early 2020 played their home matches primarily at Metalist Oblast Sports Complex in Kharkiv.

NSC Olympiyskiy	Metalist	Valeriy Lobanovskyi Dynamo	Donbas Arena	Shakhtar	RSC Olimpiyskiy
Kyiv	Kharkiv	Kyiv	Donetsk	Donetsk	Donetsk
70,050	40,003	16,873	52,187	31,718	25,678
Main arenas (at least 5 home matches)

== Statistics ==
=== Match tallies ===
The table shows number of wins for both clubs per competition as well as totals.

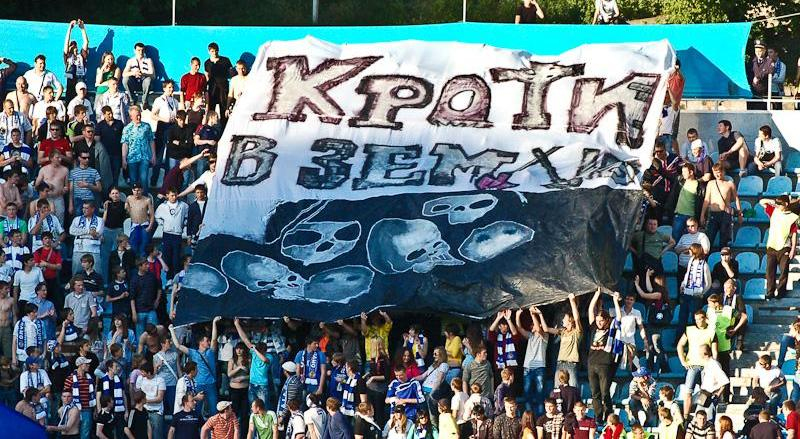
Fans of Dynamo Kyiv

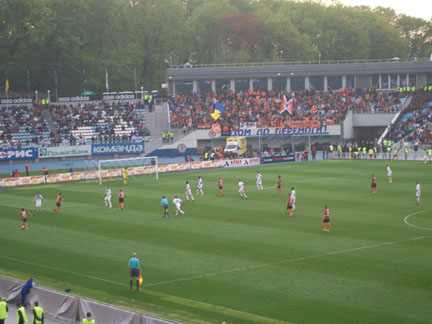
Scenes from 2011 Derby game in Kyiv

As of match played 8 November 2026

Competition	Dynamo Kyiv	Draws	Shakhtar Donetsk
Ukraine
Ukrainian Premier League	25	22	30
Ukrainian Cup	6	0	11
Ukrainian Super Cup	8	0	6
Aggregate	39	22	47
Soviet Union
Soviet Top League	41	26	15
Soviet Cup	2	0	1
Soviet Football Federation Cup	1	1	3
Ukrainian Cup	4	1	0
Aggregate	48	28	19
European
UEFA Europa League / UEFA Cup	0	1	1
Aggregate	0	1	1
Total aggregate	87	51	67

- Notes:
1. The Soviet Super Cup was not an official competition. It was organized by an editorial department of the Soviet newspaper Komsomolskaya Pravda.
2. While in the Soviet Union the Football Cup of the Ukrainian SSR competitions had official status, since gaining Ukrainian independence the status of the Football Cup of the Ukrainian SSR is not determined by the independent Ukrainian Association of Football (Football Federation of Ukraine).

=== Titles ===
Number of titles for both clubs

Dynamo Kyiv	Competition	Shakhtar Donetsk
Ukraine
17	Ukrainian Premier League	15
13	Ukrainian Cup	15
9	Ukrainian Super Cup	9
39	Aggregate	39
Soviet Union
13	Soviet Top League	—
9	Soviet Cup	4
7	Ukrainian Cup	—
29	Aggregate	4
European and Continentals
2	UEFA Cup Winners' Cup	—
—	UEFA Europa League/UEFA Cup	1
1	UEFA Super Cup	—
3	Aggregate	1
71	Total Aggregate	44

- Notes:
1. The Soviet Super Cup was not an official competition. It was organized by an editorial department of the Soviet newspaper Komsomolskaya Pravda.
2. While in the Soviet Union the Football Cup of the Ukrainian SSR competitions had official status, since gaining Ukrainian independence the status of the Football Cup of the Ukrainian SSR is not determined by the independent Ukrainian Association of Football (Football Federation of Ukraine).

=== Year-by-year league's standings ===
The table lists the place each team took in each of the seasons.

	38	39	40	49	50	51	52	55	56	57	58	59	60	62	63	64	65	66	67	68	69	70	71	73	74	75	76s	76f	77	78	79	80	81	82	83	84	85	86	87	88	89	90	91
Teams	26	14	13	18	19	15	14	12	12	12	12	12	22	22	20	17	17	19	19	20	20	17	16	16	16	16	16	16	16	16	18	18	18	18	18	18	18	16	16	16	16	13	16
Dynamo Kyiv	4	8	8	7	13	8	2	6	4	6	6	7	2	5	9	6	2	1	1	1	2	7	1	2	1	1	8	2	1	2	3	1	1	2	7	10	1	1	6	2	3	1	5
Shakhtar Donetsk	11	12	12	18	11	3	13	7	7	8	8	12	17	8	11	5	12	10	6	14	10	10	16	6	12	2	5	10	5	3	2	6	7	14	9	13	12	6	7	8	14	8	12

	1992	92/93	93/94	94/95	95/96	96/97	97/98	98/99	99/00	00/01	01/02	02/03	03/04	04/05	05/06	06/07	07/08	08/09	09/10	10/11	11/12	12/13	13/14	14/15	15/16	16/17
Teams	20	16	18	18	18	16	16	16	16	14	14	16	16	16	16	16	16	16	16	16	16	16	16	14	14	12
Dynamo Kyiv	2	1	1	1	1	1	1	1	1	1	2	1	1	2	2	1	2	1	2	2	2	3	4	1	1	2
Shakhtar Donetsk	4	4	2	4	10	2	2	2	2	2	1	2	2	1	1	2	1	2	1	1	1	1	1	2	2	1

	17/18	18/19	19/20	20/21	21/22	22/23	23/24	24/25
Teams	12	12	12	14	16	16	16	16
Dynamo Kyiv	2	2	2	1	(2)	4	2	1
Shakhtar Donetsk	1	1	1	2	(1)	1	1	3

=== All continental competition games ===
Dynamo Kyiv win	Draw	Shakhtar Donetsk win

==== UEFA Cup/UEFA Europa League ====
Season	Date	Stage	Location	Host	Guest	Score	Goals	
Season	Date	Stage	Location	Host	Guest	Score	Host	Guest
2008–09	30 April 2009	Semi-finals	Stadion Dynamo im.V.Lobanovskoho, Kyiv	Dynamo Kyiv	Shakhtar Donetsk	1 – 1	Chyhrynskyi (22 own)	Fernandinho (68)
2008–09	7 May 2009	Semi-finals	Regional Sports Complex Olimpiyskiy, Donetsk	Shakhtar Donetsk	Dynamo Kyiv	2 – 1	Jádson (17), Ilsinho (89)	Bangoura (47)

=== All domestic league games ===
==== Soviet League ====
Season	Date	Location	Host	Guest	Score	Goals	
Season	Date	Location	Host	Guest	Score	Host	Guest
1938	18 July 1938	Stadion Dynamo im. Yezhova, Kyiv	Dynamo Kyiv	Stakhanovets Stalino	2 – 0	Laiko (27, 55)	
1939	30 June 1939	Stadion Dynamo, Kyiv	Dynamo Kyiv	Stakhanovets Stalino	1 – 1	Afanasiev (15)	Bikezin (67, pen.)
1939	30 September 1939	Stadion Stakhanovets, Stalino	Stakhanovets Stalino	Dinamo Kiev	3 – 3	Balaba (8), Vasin (25), Nesmekha (38)	Komarov (4), Laiko (55), Shylovsky (75)
1939	6 November 1939	Stadion Stakhanovets, Stalino	Stakhanovets Stalino	Dinamo Kiev	3 – 1	Bikezin (40, pen.), Yakovlev (63), Vasin (80)	Shylovsky (25)
1940	2 July 1940	Stadion Stakhanovets, Stalino	Stakhanovets Stalino	Dinamo Kiev	1 – 2	Yakovlev (28)	Laiko (52, 60)
1940	6 October 1940	Stadion Dynamo, Kyiv	Dinamo Kiev	Stakhanovets Stalino	1 – 1	Krasyuk (12, own)	Krasyuk (64)
1941	Ten rounds into the season it was scratched due to invasion of the Soviet Union by the Nazi Germany. The first match of the season scheduled to be held for 29 June 1941 in Kiev never took place.						
1942–1944	Military occupation of the Soviet Union by the Nazi Germany						
1949	2 May 1949	Stadion Dynamo, Kyiv	Dinamo Kiev	Shakhter Stalino	2 – 0	Tovt (21), Ponomaryov (?)	
1949	15 August 1949	Stadion Shakhtar, Stalino	Shakhter Stalino	Dinamo Kiev	1 – 0	Leichenko (2)	
1950	22 June 1950	Stadion Dynamo, Kyiv	Dinamo Kiev	Shakhter Stalino	4 – 1	Alpatov (7), Sengentovski (28), Ponomaryov (38), Vinkovatov (64)	Lerman (75, own)
1950	26 July 1950	Stadion Shakhtar, Stalino	Shakhter Stalino	Dinamo Kiev	6 – 0	Havrylenko (32), Fomin (34), Kolesnykov (35, 44), Ivanov (52), Savynov (80)	
1951	11 June 1951	Respublikanskiy Stadion im.N.Khruscheva, Kyiv	Dynamo Kyiv	Shakhtar Stalino	1 – 3	Tovt (46)	Ponomaryov (48, 72), Havrylenko (81, pen.)
1951	26 June 1951	Stadion Shakhter, Stalino	Shakhtar Stalino	Dinamo Kiev	0 – 1		Vinkovatov (72)
1952	25 July 1952	Stadion Dinamo, Moscow	Shakhtar Stalino	Dinamo Kiev	0 – 4		Bohdanovych (18, 69, 74), Zazroyev (70)
1955	20 May 1955	Respublikanskiy Stadion im.N.Khruscheva, Kyiv	Dinamo Kiev	Shakhter Stalino	1 – 0	Terentiev (23)	
1955	11 September 1955	Stadion Shakhter, Stalino	Shakhter Stalino	Dinamo Kiev	0 – 0		
1956	6 May 1956	Stadion Shakhter, Stalino	Shakhter Stalino	Dinamo Kiev	1 – 1	Dumanskyi (37)	Lypskyi (57)
1956	8 July 1956	Respublikanskiy Stadion im.N.Khruscheva, Kyiv	Dinamo Kiev	Shakhter Stalino	1 – 2	Kanevskyi (5)	Dubrovytskyi (70), Boboshko (82)
1957	19 May 1957	Respublikanskiy Stadion im.N.Khruscheva, Kyiv	Dinamo Kiev	Shakhter Stalino	2 – 0	Koltsov (43, pen.), Korshunov (87)	
1957	13 November 1957	Stadion Shakhter, Stalino	Shakhter Stalino	Dinamo Kiev	2 – 0	Boboshko (15), Dubrovytskyi (21)	
1958	2 May 1958	Stadion Shakhter, Stalino	Shakhter Stalino	Dinamo Kiev	1 – 0	Parshin (2)	
1958	15 September 1958	Respublikanskiy Stadion im.N.Khruscheva, Kyiv	Dinamo Kiev	Shakhter Stalino	1 – 0	Fomin (66)	
1959	13 July 1959	Stadion Shakhter, Stalino	Shakhter Stalino	Dinamo Kiev	0 – 2		Golodets (37, 73)
1959	11 October 1959	Respublikanskiy Stadion im.N.Khruscheva, Kyiv	Dinamo Kiev	Shakhter Stalino	1 – 1	Biba (41 pen.)	Fedosov (67)
1960	10 April 1960	Stadion Shakhter, Stalino	Shakhter Stalino	Dinamo Kiev	2 – 2	Fedosov (15, 51)	Biba (6, 24)
1960	13 June 1960	Respublikanskiy Stadion im.N.Khruscheva, Kyiv	Dinamo Kiev	Shakhter Stalino	4 – 1	Kovalyov (5, 25), Kanevskyi (34), Troyanovskyi (44)	Ananchenko (14)
1962	31 May 1962	Respublikanskiy Stadion im.N.Khruscheva, Kyiv	Dinamo Kiev	Shakhter Stalino	1 – 1	Biba (38)	Holovko (33)
1962	22 August 1962	Stadion Shakhter, Donetsk	Shakhter Donetsk	Dinamo Kiev	3 – 0	Sorokin (75), Rodin (84), Kolosov (85)	
1963	7 May 1963	Stadion Shakhter, Donetsk	Shakhter Donetsk	Dinamo Kiev	3 – 1	Ananchenko (51), Rodin (72), Khmelnytskyi (77)	Biba (81)
1963	3 September 1963	Tsentralnyi Stadion, Kyiv	Dinamo Kiev	Shakhter Donetsk	3 – 1	Voynov (7), Serebryanikov (74), Kanevskyi (85)	Ivanov (11)
1964	2 July 1964	Tsentralnyi Stadion, Kyiv	Dinamo Kiev	Shakhter Donetsk	1 – 1	Medvid (8)	Khmelnytskyi (82)
1964	4 November 1964	Stadion Shakhter, Donetsk	Shakhter Donetsk	Dinamo Kiev	0 – 0		
1965	9 May 1965	Stadion Lokomotyv, Donetsk	Shakhter Donetsk	Dinamo Kiev	3 – 2	Rodin (34, 50), Salkov (44)	Drovetskyi (85), Sabo (89, pen.)
1965	8 November 1965	Tsentralnyi Stadion, Kyiv	Dinamo Kiev	Shakhter Donetsk	3 – 1	Bazylevych (54), Khmelnytskyi (56), Serebryanikov (81)	Stankevičius (86)
1966	28 July 1966	Stadion Lokomotyv, Donetsk	Shakhter Donetsk	Dinamo Kiev	0 – 2		Muntyan (43), Biba (72)
1966	8 September 1966	Tsentralnyi Stadion, Kyiv	Dinamo Kiev	Shakhter Donetsk	3 – 1	Khmelnytskyi (19), Biba (22), Byshovets (43), Sabo (65)	Ananchenko (45, 89), Mizernyi (81)
1967	27 April 1967	Tsentralnyi Stadion, Kyiv	Dinamo Kiev	Shakhter Donetsk	3 – 0	Byshovets (32, 47), Khmelnytskyi (84)	
1967	7 August 1967	Stadion Shakhter, Donetsk	Shakhter Donetsk	Dinamo Kiev	2 – 1	Bazylevych (43, 81)	Muntyan (67)
1968	17 April 1968	Tsentralnyi Stadion, Kyiv	Dinamo Kiev	Shakhter Donetsk	1 – 1	Byshovets (26)	Zelkevičius (50)
1968	27 July 1968	Stadion Shakhter, Donetsk	Shakhter Donetsk	Dinamo Kiev	2 – 3	Glodenis (17, 50)	Turyanchyk (8, 61), Pollak (74 own)
1969	15 August 1969	Stadion Shakhter, Donetsk	Shakhter Donetsk	Dinamo Kiev	0 – 2		Serebryanikov (32), Puzach (74)
1969	5 October 1969	Tsentralnyi Stadion, Kyiv	Dinamo Kiev	Shakhter Donetsk	1 – 0	Byshovets (82)	
1970	2 April 1970	Stadion Shakhter, Donetsk	Shakhter Donetsk	Dinamo Kiev	0 – 1		Byshovets (61)
1970	10 September 1970	Tsentralnyi Stadion, Kyiv	Dinamo Kiev	Shakhter Donetsk	3 – 0	Puzach (34), Muntyan (58), Drozdenko (82 own)	
1971	2 May 1971	Stadion Shakhter, Donetsk	Shakhter Donetsk	Dinamo Kiev	0 – 1		Veremeyev (30)
1971	18 August 1971	Tsentralnyi Stadion, Kyiv	Dinamo Kiev	Shakhter Donetsk	4 – 3	Veremeyev (16), Khmelnytskyi (43, 47), Kolotov (81)	Yaremchenko (26, 34 pen., 90 pen.)
1973	16 May 1973	Stadion Shakhter, Donetsk	Shakhter Donetsk	Dinamo Kiev	0 – 2		Muntyan (38), Damin (88)
1973	29 September 1973	Tsentralnyi Stadion, Kyiv	Dinamo Kiev	Shakhter Donetsk	2 – 1	Blokhin (9, 57)	Zakharov (77)
1974	21 April 1974	Tsentralnyi Stadion, Kyiv	Dinamo Kiev	Shakhter Donetsk	1 – 0	Kolotov (81 pen.)	
1974	6 August 1974	Stadion Shakhter, Donetsk	Shakhter Donetsk	Dinamo Kiev	2 – 2	Hubych (26), Starukhin (83)	Blokhin (25 pen.), Onyshchenko (60)
1975	27 April 1975	Tsentralnyi Stadion, Kyiv	Dinamo Kiev	Shakhter Donetsk	3 – 1	Matviyenko (6), Blokhin (30), Kolotov (35)	Vankevych (66)
1975	13 September 1975	Stadion Shakhter, Donetsk	Shakhter Donetsk	Dinamo Kiev	0 – 1		Blokhin (75)
1976	16 May 1976	Stadion Lokomotyv, Donetsk	Shakhter Donetsk	Dinamo Kiev	0 – 0		
1976	22 September 1976	Stadion Shakhter, Donetsk	Shakhter Donetsk	Dinamo Kiev	0 – 0		
1977	14 June 1977	Tsentralnyi Stadion, Kyiv	Dinamo Kiev	Shakhter Donetsk	2 – 0	Konkov (28), Veremeyev (43)	
1977	30 August 1977	Stadion Shakhter, Donetsk	Shakhter Donetsk	Dinamo Kiev	0 – 0		
1978	22 April 1978	Tsentralnyi Stadion, Kyiv	Dinamo Kiev	Shakhter Donetsk	1 – 2	Blokhin (22)	Konkov (68 own), Rohovsky (77)
1978	30 July 1978	Stadion Lokomotyv, Donetsk	Shakhter Donetsk	Dinamo Kiev	2 – 0	Safonov (36), Starukhin (43)	
1979	6 June 1979	Stadion Lokomotyv, Donetsk	Shakhter Donetsk	Dinamo Kiev	1 – 0	Starukhin (83)	
1979	22 August 1979	Stadion Dinamo, Kyiv	Dinamo Kiev	Shakhter Donetsk	2 – 0	Zhuravlyov (38), Lozynskyi (67)	
1980	19 June 1980	Stadion Dinamo, Kyiv	Dinamo Kiev	Shakhter Donetsk	5 – 0	Blokhin (10, 89), Boyko (51), Buryak (56 pen.), Khapsalis (65)	
1980	5 October 1980	Stadion Lokomotyv, Donetsk	Shakhter Donetsk	Dinamo Kiev	0 – 1		Kaplun (83)
1981	7 April 1981	Stadion Lokomotyv, Donetsk	Shakhter Donetsk	Dinamo Kiev	0 – 0		
1981	21 August 1981	Respublikanskiy Stadion, Kyiv	Dinamo Kiev	Shakhter Donetsk	2 – 1	Veremeyev (65), Buryak (85)	Horbunov (14)
1982	12 May 1982	Stadion Shakhter, Donetsk	Shakhter Donetsk	Dinamo Kiev	0 – 0		
1982	11 September 1982	Respublikanskiy Stadion, Kyiv	Dinamo Kiev	Shakhter Donetsk	5 – 0	Yevtushenko (23 pen.), Khlus (25), Lozynskyi (45), Buryak (83), Pasichnyi (86)	
1983	20 June 1983	Respublikanskiy Stadion, Kyiv	Dinamo Kiev	Shakhter Donetsk	1 – 1	Blokhin (72)	Morozov (53)
1983	9 August 1983	Stadion Shakhter, Donetsk	Shakhter Donetsk	Dinamo Kiev	1 – 2	Smolyaninov (60)	Yevtushenko (10), Zavarov (85)
1984	15 June 1984	Stadion Shakhter, Donetsk	Shakhter Donetsk	Dinamo Kiev	1 – 1	Hrachov (47)	Blokhin (17)
1984	2 August 1984	Respublikanskiy Stadion, Kyiv	Dinamo Kiev	Shakhter Donetsk	2 – 2	Zavarov (43), Blokhin (54)	Yashchenko (69), Hoshkoderya (73)
1985	9 April 1985	Stadion Shakhter, Donetsk	Shakhter Donetsk	Dinamo Kiev	1 – 2	Kravchenko (84 pen.)	Belanov (10, 60)
1985	3 September 1985	Respublikanskiy Stadion, Kyiv	Dinamo Kiev	Shakhter Donetsk	2 – 0	Yevtushenko (47), Yaremchuk (88)	
1986	11 September 1986	Stadion Shakhter, Donetsk	Shakhter Donetsk	Dinamo Kiev	3 – 3	Petrov (55, 87, 89 pen.)	Mykhaylychenko (13), Rats (44), Bezsonov (80 pen.)
1986	3 December 1986	Respublikanskiy Stadion, Kyiv	Dinamo Kiev	Shakhter Donetsk	4 – 1	Zavarov (15), Belanov (28, 34, 81)	Petrov (84)
1987	6 May 1987	Stadion Shakhter, Donetsk	Shakhter Donetsk	Dinamo Kiev	1 – 0	Hrachov (86)	
1987	14 July 1987	Respublikanskiy Stadion, Kyiv	Dinamo Kiev	Shakhter Donetsk	0 – 0		
1988	12 March 1988	Stadion Shakhter, Donetsk	Shakhter Donetsk	Dinamo Kiev	1 – 1	Kobozyev (14)	Zavarov (72)
1988	17 September 1988	Respublikanskiy Stadion, Kyiv	Dinamo Kiev	Shakhter Donetsk	0 – 0		
1989	19 April 1989	Respublikanskiy Stadion, Kyiv	Dinamo Kiev	Shakhter Donetsk	1 – 0	Belanov (18)	
1989	1 October 1989	Stadion Shakhter, Donetsk	Shakhter Donetsk	Dinamo Kiev	3 – 3	Yurchenko (38), Hulyayev (57), Leonov (64)	Salenko (28, 34), Zayets (55)
1990	21 April 1990	Respublikanskiy Stadion, Kyiv	Dinamo Kiev	Shakhter Donetsk	2 – 0	Protasov (38 pen.), Shmatovalenko (60)	
1990	26 July 1990	Stadion Shakhter, Donetsk	Shakhter Donetsk	Dinamo Kiev	2 – 2	Yevseyev (28 pen.), Kobozyev (70)	Protasov (40), Lytovchenko (50)
1991	15 March 1991	Respublikanskiy Stadion, Kyiv	Dinamo Kiev	Shakhter Donetsk	0 – 0		
1991	27 October 1991	Stadion Shakhter, Donetsk	Shakhter Donetsk	Dinamo Kiev	1 – 2	Rebrov (62)	Salenko (16), Hrytsyna (77)

Notes:

- In Soviet league competitions both teams met 82 times, all in the Soviet Top League.
- 41 wins of Dinamo, 15 wins of Shakhter, 26 draws
- 128 goals of Dinamo, 79 goals of Shakhter

==== Ukrainian League ====
Season	Date	Location	Host	Guest	Score	Goals	
Season	Date	Location	Host	Guest	Score	Host	Guest
1992–93	4 October 1992	Respublikanskyi Stadion, Kyiv	Dynamo Kyiv	Shakhtar Donetsk	2 – 0	Leonenko (36), Pankratjevas (38)	
1992–93	2 May 1993	Tsentralnyi Stadion Shakhtar, Donetsk	Shakhtar Donetsk	Dynamo Kyiv	1 – 1	Popov (51)	Shkapenko (35)
1993–94	5 September 1993	Respublikanskyi Stadion, Kyiv	Dynamo Kyiv	Shakhtar Donetsk	1 – 1	Annenkov (29)	Popov (35)
1993–94	28 May 1994	Tsentralnyi Stadion Shakhtar, Donetsk	Shakhtar Donetsk	Dynamo Kyiv	1 – 0	Atelkin (78)	
1994–95	8 November 1994	Tsentralnyi Stadion Shakhtar, Donetsk	Shakhtar Donetsk	Dynamo Kyiv	1 – 3	Petrov (49 pen.)	Shkapenko (34 pen.), Mykhaylenko (45), Mizin (84)
1994–95	10 March 1995	Respublikanskyi Stadion, Kyiv	Dynamo Kyiv	Shakhtar Donetsk	3 – 0	Pokhlebayev (36), Leonenko (52, 56)	
1995–96	2 October 1995	Tsentralnyi Stadion Shakhtar, Donetsk	Shakhtar Donetsk	Dynamo Kyiv	2 – 3	Fedkov (17), Orbu (44)	Luzhnyi (29), Kosovskyi (35), Bezhenar (81)
1995–96	13 April 1996	Respublikanskyi Stadion, Kyiv	Dynamo Kyiv	Shakhtar Donetsk	3 – 1	Shevchenko (7, 46), Maksymov (74)	Ostashov (77)
1996–97	6 September 1996	Tsentralnyi Stadion Shakhtar, Donetsk	Shakhtar Donetsk	Dynamo Kyiv	1 – 3	Kriventsov (42)	Kosovskyi (25), Leonenko (31), Rebrov (83)
1996–97	12 May 1997	Stadion Dynamo, Kyiv	Dynamo Kyiv	Shakhtar Donetsk	3 – 1	Rebrov (69), Byalkevich (76), Mykhaylenko (86)	Kovalyov (67)
1997–98	1 September 1997	Stadion Dynamo, Kyiv	Dynamo Kyiv	Shakhtar Donetsk	3 – 0	Shevchenko (18, 44), Rebrov (85)	
1997–98	28 April 1998	Tsentralnyi Stadion Shakhtar, Donetsk	Shakhtar Donetsk	Dynamo Kyiv	0 – 0		
1998–99	29 November 1998	Stadion Dynamo, Kyiv	Dynamo Kyiv	Shakhtar Donetsk	2 – 1	Rebrov (32), Shevchenko (73)	Matveyev (89)
1998–99	22 May 1999	Tsentralnyi Stadion Shakhtar, Donetsk	Shakhtar Donetsk	Dynamo Kyiv	0 – 0		
1999–00	29 November 1999	Tsentralnyi Stadion Shakhtar, Donetsk	Shakhtar Donetsk	Dynamo Kyiv	0 – 0		
1999–00	14 May 2000	Stadion Dynamo, Kyiv	Dynamo Kyiv	Shakhtar Donetsk	2 – 1	Khatskevich (45), Byalkevich (77)	Vorobey (60)
2000–01	1 October 2000	Tsentralnyi Stadion Shakhtar, Donetsk	Shakhtar Donetsk	Dynamo Kyiv	1 – 1	Vorobey (47)	Bodnár (40)
2000–01	7 April 2001	Olimpiyskiy National Sports Complex, Kyiv	Dynamo Kyiv	Shakhtar Donetsk	1 – 2	Melaschenko (17)	Aghahowa (50), N'Diaye (53)
2001–02	15 July 2001	Stadion Dynamo, Kyiv	Dynamo Kyiv	Shakhtar Donetsk	2 – 2	Melaschenko (17), Nesmachniy (62)	N'Diaye (81), Vorobey (83)
2001–02	3 June 2002	Tsentralnyi Stadion Shakhtar, Donetsk	Shakhtar Donetsk	Dynamo Kyiv	2 – 0	Fedorov (43 own), Gavrančić (90 own)	
2002–03	26 July 2002	Olimpiyskiy Regional Sports Complex, Donetsk	Shakhtar Donetsk	Dynamo Kyiv	1 – 0	Vorobey (45)	
2002–03	21 May 2003	Stadion Dynamo im. V.Lobanovskoho, Kyiv	Dynamo Kyiv	Shakhtar Donetsk	2 – 1	Shatskikh (45), Pukanych (58 own)	Popov (27)
2003–04	5 October 2003	Stadion Dynamo im. V.Lobanovskoho, Kyiv	Dynamo Kyiv	Shakhtar Donetsk	1 – 1	Rincón (67)	Tymoshchuk (6)
2003–04	10 April 2004	Olimpiyskiy Regional Sports Complex, Donetsk	Shakhtar Donetsk	Dynamo Kyiv	2 – 4	Lewandowski (45), Tymoshchuk (48)	Verpakovskis (17), Rincón (35), Leko (61), Cernat (87)
2004–05	15 July 2004	Stadion Dynamo im. V.Lobanovskoho, Kyiv	Dynamo Kyiv	Shakhtar Donetsk	0 – 2		Lewandowski (35), Duljaj (83)
2004–05	16 June 2005	Olimpiyskiy Regional Sports Complex, Donetsk	Shakhtar Donetsk	Dynamo Kyiv	3 – 2	Byelik (45), Jádson (56, 90)	Rincón (69 pen.), Kléber (84)
2005–06	7 November 2005	Olimpiyskiy Regional Sports Complex, Donetsk	Shakhtar Donetsk	Dynamo Kyiv	0 – 1		Rebrov (74)
2005–06	10 May 2006	Stadion Dynamo im. V.Lobanovskoho, Kyiv	Dynamo Kyiv	Shakhtar Donetsk	2 – 2	Shatskikh (10), Milevskyi (21)	Chyhrynskyi (53), Jádson (65)
2005–06	14 May 2006	Stadion Metalurh, Kryvyi Rih	Shakhtar Donetsk	Dynamo Kyiv	2 – 1	Marica (60), Aghahowa (100)	Rodolfo (80)
2006–07	6 November 2006	Stadion Dynamo im. V.Lobanovskoho, Kyiv	Dynamo Kyiv	Shakhtar Donetsk	1 – 0	Shatskikh (73)	
2006–07	23 May 2007	Olimpiyskiy Regional Sports Complex, Donetsk	Shakhtar Donetsk	Dynamo Kyiv	2 – 2	Lewandowski (18), Brandão (49 pen.)	Kléber (26), Rincón (57)
2007–08	15 July 2007	Olimpiyskiy Regional Sports Complex, Donetsk	Shakhtar Donetsk	Dynamo Kyiv	1 – 1	Jádson (60)	Rincón (25)
2007–08	11 November 2007	Stadion Dynamo im. V.Lobanovskoho, Kyiv	Dynamo Kyiv	Shakhtar Donetsk	2 – 1	Bangoura (44, 52)	Jádson (47 pen.)
2008–09	16 November 2008	Olimpiyskiy Regional Sports Complex, Donetsk	Shakhtar Donetsk	Dynamo Kyiv	1 – 0	Willian (34)	
2008–09	26 May 2009	Stadion Dynamo im. V.Lobanovskoho, Kyiv	Dynamo Kyiv	Shakhtar Donetsk	1 – 0	Milevskyi (79)	
2009–10	21 November 2009	Stadion Dynamo im. V.Lobanovskoho, Kyiv	Dynamo Kyiv	Shakhtar Donetsk	3 – 0	Milevskyi (45, 54), Yarmolenko (61)	
2009–10	5 May 2010	Donbas Arena, Donetsk	Shakhtar Donetsk	Dynamo Kyiv	1 – 0	Ilsinho (15)	
2010–11	3 October 2010	Donbas Arena, Donetsk	Shakhtar Donetsk	Dynamo Kyiv	2 – 0	Luiz Adriano (64), Teixeira (90)	
2010–11	1 May 2011	Stadion Dynamo im. V.Lobanovskoho, Kyiv	Dynamo Kyiv	Shakhtar Donetsk	3 – 0	Husyev (24 pen., 90), Shevchenko (62)	
2011–12	24 September 2011	Stadion Dynamo im. V.Lobanovskoho, Kyiv	Dynamo Kyiv	Shakhtar Donetsk	0 – 0		
2011–12	7 April 2012	Donbas Arena, Donetsk	Shakhtar Donetsk	Dynamo Kyiv	2 – 0	Teixeira (56), Rakitskiy (80)	
2012–13	2 September 2012	Donbas Arena, Donetsk	Shakhtar Donetsk	Dynamo Kyiv	3 – 1	Kucher (19, 62), Adriano (81)	Yarmolenko (45)
2012–13	7 April 2013	Olimpiyskiy National Sports Complex, Kyiv	Dynamo Kyiv	Shakhtar Donetsk	1 – 2	Yarmolenko (10)	Mkhitaryan (44, 75)
2013–14	4 August 2013	Donbas Arena, Donetsk	Shakhtar Donetsk	Dynamo Kyiv	3 – 1	Srna (2), Eduardo (52), Teixeira (84)	Belhanda (8)
2013–14	16 April 2014	Olimpiyskiy National Sports Complex, Kyiv	Dynamo Kyiv	Shakhtar Donetsk	0 – 2		Luiz Adriano (10, 34)
2014–15	5 October 2014	Olimpiyskiy National Sports Complex, Kyiv	Dynamo Kyiv	Shakhtar Donetsk	1 – 0	Vida (71)	
2014–15	26 April 2015	Arena Lviv, Lviv	Shakhtar Donetsk	Dynamo Kyiv	0 – 0		
2015–16	16 October 2015	Olimpiyskiy National Sports Complex, Kyiv	Dynamo Kyiv	Shakhtar Donetsk	0 – 3		Marlos (40), Teixeira (59, 67)
2015–16	1 May 2016	Arena Lviv, Lviv	Shakhtar Donetsk	Dynamo Kyiv	3 – 0	Eduardo (33, 80), Nem (73)	
2016–17	9 September 2016	Oblast Sports Complex Metalist, Kharkiv	Shakhtar Donetsk	Dynamo Kyiv	1 – 1	Dentinho (75)	Husyev (24 pen.)
2016–17	12 December 2016	Olimpiyskiy National Sports Complex, Kyiv	Dynamo Kyiv	Shakhtar Donetsk	3 – 4	Júnior Moraes (1), Rybalka (30), Besyedin (90+2)	Khacheridi (3 own, 88 own), Fred (51), Ferreyra (58)
2016–17	21 April 2017	Olimpiyskiy National Sports Complex, Kyiv	Dynamo Kyiv	Shakhtar Donetsk	0 – 1		Ferreyra (12)
2016–17	26 May 2017	Oblast Sports Complex Metalist, Kharkiv	Shakhtar Donetsk	Dynamo Kyiv	2 – 3	Patrick (23), Dentinho (58)	Harmash (20), Yarmolenko (52 pen., 71)
2017–18	22 July 2017	Oblast Sports Complex Metalist, Kharkiv	Shakhtar Donetsk	Dynamo Kyiv	0 – 1		Mbokani (46)
2017–18	22 October 2017	Olimpiyskiy National Sports Complex, Kyiv	Dynamo Kyiv	Shakhtar Donetsk	0 – 0		
2017–18	14 April 2018	Oblast Sports Complex Metalist, Kharkiv	Shakhtar Donetsk	Dynamo Kyiv	0 – 1		Shepelyev (32)
2017–18	19 May 2018	Stadion Dynamo im.V.Lobanovskoho, Kyiv	Dynamo Kyiv	Shakhtar Donetsk	2 – 1	Verbič (16), Khocholava (56 own)	Marlos (23 pen.)
2018–19	3 August 2018	Olimpiyskiy National Sports Complex, Kyiv	Dynamo Kyiv	Shakhtar Donetsk	1 – 0	Verbič (64)	
2018–19	3 November 2018	Oblast Sports Complex Metalist, Kharkiv	Shakhtar Donetsk	Dynamo Kyiv	2 – 1	Júnior Moraes (54), Kovalenko (90+5)	Shaparenko (44)
2018–19	24 April 2019	Olimpiyskiy National Sports Complex, Kyiv	Dynamo Kyiv	Shakhtar Donetsk	0 – 0		
2018–19	22 May 2019	Oblast Sports Complex Metalist, Kharkiv	Shakhtar Donetsk	Dynamo Kyiv	1 – 1	Tetê (50)	Tsyhankov (37 pen.)
2019–20	10 August 2019	Olimpiyskiy National Sports Complex, Kyiv	Dynamo Kyiv	Shakhtar Donetsk	1 – 2	Rodrigues (39)	Júnior Moraes (21), Marlos (65)
2019–20	10 November 2019	Oblast Sports Complex Metalist, Kharkiv	Shakhtar Donetsk	Dynamo Kyiv	1 – 0	Kryvtsov (18)	
2019–20	31 May 2020	Olimpiyskiy National Sports Complex, Kyiv	Shakhtar Donetsk	Dynamo Kyiv	3 – 1	Marlos (39, 67), Marcos Antônio (74)	Buyalskyi (38)
2019–20	4 July 2020	Olimpiyskiy National Sports Complex, Kyiv	Dynamo Kyiv	Shakhtar Donetsk	2 – 3	Verbič (51), de Pena (67)	Stepanenko (31), Konoplianka (39), Patrick (72)
2020–21	8 November 2020	Olimpiyskiy National Sports Complex, Kyiv	Dynamo Kyiv	Shakhtar Donetsk	0 – 3		Júnior Moraes (34), Marcos Antônio (66), Patrick (73)
2020–21	17 April 2021	Olimpiyskiy National Sports Complex, Kyiv	Shakhtar Donetsk	Dynamo Kyiv	0 – 1		de Pena (34 pen.)
2021–22	3 October 2021	Olimpiyskiy National Sports Complex, Kyiv	Dynamo Kyiv	Shakhtar Donetsk	0 – 0		
2021–22	The second match (Round 25) never took place due to wide-scale invasion of Ukraine by the Russian Federation.						
2022–23	16 October 2022	Arena Lviv, Lviv	Shakhtar Donetsk	Dynamo Kyiv	3 – 1	Zubkov (29), Mudryk (47), Sikan (74)	Vanat (46)
2022–23	22 April 2023	Stadion Dynamo im. Valeria Lobonovskoho, Kyiv	Dynamo Kyiv	Shakhtar Donetsk	1 – 1	Andriyevskyi (82)	Stepanenko (12)
2023–24	3 November 2023	Stadion Dynamo im. Valeria Lobonovskoho, Kyiv	Dynamo Kyiv	Shakhtar Donetsk	0 – 1		Zubkov (53)
2023–24	11 May 2024	Arena Lviv, Lviv	Shakhtar Donetsk	Dynamo Kyiv	1 – 0	Sudakov (33 pen.)	
2024–25	27 October 2024	Stadion Dynamo im. Valeria Lobonovskoho, Kyiv	Dynamo Kyiv	Shakhtar Donetsk	1 – 1	Karavayev (87)	Bondarenko (48)
2024–25	27 April 2025	Arena Lviv, Lviv	Shakhtar Donetsk	Dynamo Kyiv	2 – 2	Kevin (6 pen.), Eguinaldo (20)	Vanat (56), Kabayev (90+3)
2025–26	2 November 2025	Arena Lviv, Lviv	Shakhtar Donetsk	Dynamo Kyiv	3 – 1	Eguinaldo (3), Newerton (54), Kabayev (90+4 o.g.),	Buyalskyi (56)
2025–26	3 May 2026	Stadion Dynamo im. Valeria Lobonovskoho, Kyiv	Dynamo Kyiv	Shakhtar Donetsk	1 – 2	Ponomarenko (13)	Ferreira (50), Traoré (69)
2026–27	8 November 2026	Arena Lviv, Lviv	Shakhtar Donetsk	Dynamo Kyiv	0 – 0		
2026–27	2027	Stadion Dynamo im. Valeria Lobonovskoho, Kyiv	Dynamo Kyiv	Shakhtar Donetsk			

Notes:

- In Ukrainian league competitions both teams met 74 times, all in the Ukrainian Premier League.
- 28 wins of Shakhtar, 25 wins of Dynamo, 21 draws
- Current streak(s): Shakhtar is unbeatable in last 7 league's meetings; since August of 2018 Dynamo won only once

=== All national cup competition games ===
==== Soviet cup ====
Season	Date	Stage	Location	Host	Guest	Score	Goals	
Season	Date	Stage	Location	Host	Guest	Score	Host	Guest
1967–68	23 July 1968	Round of 16	Stadion Shakhter, Donetsk	Shakhter Donetsk	Dinamo Kiev	1 – 0	Yaremchenko (4)	
1978	12 August 1978	Final	Stadion Torpedo, Moscow	Dinamo Kiev	Shakhter Donetsk	2 – 1 (a.e.t.)	Blokhin (55, 92)	Starukhin (15)
1984–85	23 June 1985	Final	Tsentralny Stadion im.V.Lenina, Moscow	Dinamo Kiev	Shakhter Donetsk	2 – 1	Demyanenko (56), Blokhin (58)	Morozov (68)

==== Ukrainian cup ====
Season	Date	Stage	Location	Host	Guest	Score	Goals	
Season	Date	Stage	Location	Host	Guest	Score	Host	Guest
2001–02	26 May 2002	Final	Olimpiyskiy National Sports Complex, Kyiv	Dynamo Kyiv	Shakhtar Donetsk	2 – 3 (a.e.t.)	Byalkevich (31), Shatskikh (50)	Popov (10), Atelkin (82), Vorobey (99)
2002–03	25 May 2003	Final	Olimpiyskiy National Sports Complex, Kyiv	Dynamo Kyiv	Shakhtar Donetsk	2 – 1	Khatskevich (56), Rincón (90+1)	Vorobey (18)
2004–05	29 May 2005	Final	Olimpiyskiy National Sports Complex, Kyiv	Shakhtar Donetsk	Dynamo Kyiv	0 – 1		Rincón (11)
2006–07	27 May 2007	Final	Olimpiyskiy National Sports Complex, Kyiv	Shakhtar Donetsk	Dynamo Kyiv	1 – 2	Elano (89)	Kléber de Souza (58), Oleh Husiev (80)
2007–08	7 May 2008	Final	Oblast Sports Complex Metalist, Kharkiv	Shakhtar Donetsk	Dynamo Kyiv	2 – 0	Hladkyy (44), Hai (78)	
2008–09	13 May 2009	Semi-finals	Regional Sports Complex Olimpiyskiy, Donetsk	Shakhtar Donetsk	Dynamo Kyiv	1 – 0	Lewandowski (83)	
2009–10	28 October 2009	Quarter-finals	Donbas Arena, Donetsk	Shakhtar Donetsk	Dynamo Kyiv	2 – 0	Srna (23), Fernandinho (90+3)	
2010–11	25 May 2011	Final	Stadion Yuvileiny, Sumy	Dynamo Kyiv	Shakhtar Donetsk	0 – 2		Eduardo (64), Luiz Adriano (87)
2011–12	26 October 2011	Round of 16	Stadion Dynamo im.V.Lobanovskoho, Kyiv	Dynamo Kyiv	Shakhtar Donetsk	2 – 3	Yarmolenko (41), Milevskyi (90+5)	Eduardo (9, 88), Teixeira (21)
2012–13	23 September 2012	Round of 32	Donbas Arena, Donetsk	Shakhtar Donetsk	Dynamo Kyiv	4 – 1	Luiz Adriano (22), Teixeira (40), Fernandinho (76), Srna (82)	Taiwo (27)
2013–14	15 May 2014	Final	Stadion Vorskla im.O.Butovskoho, Poltava	Dynamo Kyiv	Shakhtar Donetsk	2 – 1	Kucher (40 own), Vida (43)	Costa (57)
2014–15	4 June 2015	Final	Olimpiyskiy National Sports Complex, Kyiv	Dynamo Kyiv	Shakhtar Donetsk	0 – 0 (pen. 5:4)		
2016–17	17 May 2017	Final	Oblast Sports Complex Metalist, Kharkiv	Shakhtar Donetsk	Dynamo Kyiv	1 – 0	Marlos (80)	
2017–18	9 May 2018	Final	Dnipro-Arena, Dnipro	Dynamo Kyiv	Shakhtar Donetsk	0 – 2		Ferreyra (47), Rakitskiy (61)
2018–19	7 April 2019	Quarter-finals	Oblast Sports Complex Metalist, Kharkiv	Shakhtar Donetsk	Dynamo Kyiv	1 – 1 (pen. 4:3)	Júnior Moraes (57)	Harmash (9)
2019–20	30 October 2019	Round of 16	Olimpiyskiy National Sports Complex, Kyiv	Dynamo Kyiv	Shakhtar Donetsk	2 – 1 (a.e.t.)	Sydorchuk (22), Popov (110)	Stepanenko (90+2)
2024–25	14 May 2025	Final	Tsentralnyi Stadion, Zhytomyr	Shakhtar Donetsk	Dynamo Kyiv	1 – 1 (pen. 6:5)	Kauã Elias (64)	Yarmolenko (43)
2025–26	29 October 2025	Round of 16	Valeriy Lobanovskyi Dynamo Stadium, Kyiv	Dynamo Kyiv	Shakhtar Donetsk	2 – 1	Yarmolenko (72), Guerrero (79)	Meirelles (49)
2026–27	27 October 2026	Round of 16	Arena Lviv, Lviv	Shakhtar Donetsk	Dynamo Kyiv	3 – 0	Mendoza (43), Isaque (74), Alisson (87)	

=== All super cup competition games ===
==== Soviet Season's Cup ====
The match did not have an official status

Season	Date	Location	Host	Guest	Score	Goals	
Season	Date	Location	Host	Guest	Score	Host	Guest
1981	3 March 1981	Stadion Lokomotiv, Simferopol	Dinamo Kiev	Shakhter Donetsk	1 – 1 (pen. 5:4)	Boiko (41)	Kravchenko (52)
1986	11 April 1986	Respublikanskiy Stadion, Kyiv	Dinamo Kiev	Shakhter Donetsk	2 – 2 (pen. 3:1)	Shcherbakov (73), Yevtushenko (118)	Sokolovsky (54), Kravchenko (117)

==== Ukrainian Super Cup ====
Season	Date	Location	Host	Guest	Score	Goals	
Season	Date	Location	Host	Guest	Score	Host	Guest
2004	10 July 2004	Tsentralnyi Stadion of the BSS Co., Odesa	Dynamo Kyiv	Shakhtar Donetsk	1 – 1 (pen. 6:5)	Husyev (21)	Lewandowski (77)
2005	9 July 2005	Tsentralnyi Stadion of the BSS Co., Odesa	Shakhtar Donetsk	Dynamo Kyiv	1 – 1 (pen. 4:3)	Elano (5)	Bialkevich (32)
2006	16 July 2006	Tsentralnyi Stadion of the BSS Co., Odesa	Dynamo Kyiv	Shakhtar Donetsk	2 – 0	Marković (10), Milevskyi (87)	
2007	10 July 2007	Tsentralnyi Stadion of the BSS Co., Odesa	Dynamo Kyiv	Shakhtar Donetsk	2 – 2 (pen. 4:2)	Mykhalyk (27, 30)	Hladkyy (14), Tkachenko (55)
2008	15 July 2008	Stadion Vorskla im.O.Butovskoho, Poltava	Shakhtar Donetsk	Dynamo Kyiv	1 – 1 (pen. 5:3)	Chyhrynskyi (38)	Milevskyi (6)
2011	5 July 2011	Stadion Vorskla im.O.Butovskoho, Poltava	Shakhtar Donetsk	Dynamo Kyiv	1 – 3	Fernandinho (14)	Husyev (5 (p)), Diakhaté (31), Milevskyi (83)
2014	22 July 2014	Arena Lviv, Lviv	Shakhtar Donetsk	Dynamo Kyiv	2 – 0	Hladkyy (75), Marlos (90+3)	
2015	14 July 2015	Stadion Chornomorets, Odesa	Dynamo Kyiv	Shakhtar Donetsk	0 – 2		Srna (90+2 (p)), Bernard (90+4)
2016	16 July 2016	Stadion Chornomorets, Odesa	Shakhtar Donetsk	Dynamo Kyiv	1 – 1 (pen. 3:4)	Fred (58)	Vida (79)
2017	15 July 2017	Stadion Chornomorets, Odesa	Shakhtar Donetsk	Dynamo Kyiv	2 – 0	Ferreyra (8, 56)	
2018	21 July 2018	Stadion Chornomorets, Odesa	Shakhtar Donetsk	Dynamo Kyiv	0 – 1		Buialskyi (18)
2019	28 July 2019	Stadion Chornomorets, Odesa	Shakhtar Donetsk	Dynamo Kyiv	1 – 2	Patrick (45+3)	Burda (80), Harmash (83)
2020	25 August 2020	Olimpiyskiy National Sports Complex, Kyiv	Shakhtar Donetsk	Dynamo Kyiv	1 – 3	Júnior Moraes (37)	de Pena (20), Rodrigues (31), Sol (83)
2021	22 September 2021	Olimpiyskiy National Sports Complex, Kyiv	Shakhtar Donetsk	Dynamo Kyiv	3 – 0	Traoré (30, 54), Patrick (61)	

=== All other cup competition games ===
==== Championship of the Dynamo All-Ukrainian Proletarian Sports Society ====
Season	Date	Stage	Location	Host	Guest	Score	Goals	
Season	Date	Stage	Location	Host	Guest	Score	Host	Guest
1931	10 June 1931	Semi-finals	Kyiv	Dinamo Kiev	Dynamo Stalino	4 – 0	?	
1932	22 June 1932	Final group	Kharkiv	Dynamo Stalino	Dinamo Kiev	0 – 2		?
1935	24 September 1935	Final group	Kyiv	Dinamo Kiev	Dynamo Stalino	4 – 1	?	?

==== Football cup of the Ukrainian SSR ====
Since 1949 the competition was included within the Soviet Cup as its preliminary stage.

Season	Date	Stage	Location	Host	Guest	Score	Goals	
Season	Date	Stage	Location	Host	Guest	Score	Host	Guest
1938	9 August 1938	Quarter-finals	Vseukrainskiy Stadion Dinamo imeni N.Yezhova, Kiev	Dinamo Kiev	Shakhter Donetsk	3 – 2	Kuzmenko (7, 78), Schegotsky (84)	? (53), ? (56)
1944	14 October 1944	Final group	Stadion Dinamo, Kiev	Dinamo Kiev	Shakhter Donetsk	1 – 0	?	
1946	8 November 1946	Semi-finals	Stadion Dinamo, Kiev	Dinamo Kiev	Shakhter Donetsk	2 – 2	?	?
1946	9 November 1946	Semi-finals	Stadion Dinamo, Kiev	Dinamo Kiev	Shakhter Donetsk	2 – 1	?	?
1948	21 October 1948	Semi-finals	Stadion Dinamo, Kiev	Dinamo Kiev	Shakhter Donetsk	1 – 0	?	

==== USSR Football Federation Cup ====
Season	Date	Stage	Location	Host	Guest	Score	Goals	
Season	Date	Stage	Location	Host	Guest	Score	Host	Guest
1986	26 September 1986	Group stage	Respublikanskiy Stadion, Kyiv	Dinamo Kiev	Shakhter Donetsk	1 – 2	Karatayev (64)	Herasimets (59), Hrachov (67)
1987	2 June 1987	Group stage	Stadion Shakhter, Donetsk	Shakhter Donetsk	Dinamo Kiev	1 – 0	Yurchenko (64)	
1987	25 September 1987	Group stage	Stadion Dinamo, Kyiv	Dinamo Kiev	Shakhter Donetsk	3 – 2	Zavarov (42), Blokhin (72), Yevtushenko (81)	Ralyuchenko (49), Yashchenko (68)
1989	21 March 1989	Group stage	Stadion Dinamo, Kyiv	Dinamo Kiev	Shakhter Donetsk	1 – 1	Stelmakh (90)	Hulyayev (25)
1989	29 May 1989	Group stage	Stadion Shakhter, Donetsk	Shakhter Donetsk	Dinamo Kiev	1 – 0	Kobozyev (28)	

== Goalscorers ==
- Players in **bold** are still active
- In parentheses are goals scored from penalty kicks

As of match played 8 November 2026

	Name	Club	Years	League	Cup	Supercup	Europe	Other	Total
1	(Ukraine) Oleg Blokhin	Dynamo	1969–1988	11 (1)	3	0	0	1	15
2	(Ukraine) Artem Milevskyi	Dynamo	2002–2013	4	1	3	0	0	8
2	(Ukraine) **Andriy Yarmolenko**	Dynamo	2008–2017, 2023–Present	5 (1)	3	0	0	0	8
4	(Ukraine) Vitaliy Khmelnytskyi	Shakhtar; Dynamo	1962–1964; 1965–1972	2; 5	0; 0	0; 0	0; 0	0; 0	7
4	(Ukraine) Andriy Biba	Dynamo	1957–1967	7 (1)	0	0	0	0	7
4	(Brazil) Diogo Rincón	Dynamo	2002–2009	5 (1)	2	0	0	0	7
4	(Brazil) Alex Teixeira	Shakhtar	2010–2016	5	2	0	0	0	7
4	(Brazil) Marlos	Shakhtar	2014–2021	5 (1)	1	1	0	0	7
9	(Ukraine) Anatoliy Byshovets	Dynamo	1963–1973	6	0	0	0	0	6
9	(Ukraine) Igor Belanov	Dynamo	1985–1989	6	0	0	0	0	6
9	(Ukraine) Serhiy Rebrov	Shakhtar; Dynamo	1991–1992; 1992–2000, 2005–2008	1; 5	0; 0	0; 0	0; 0	0; 0	6
9	(Ukraine) Andriy Shevchenko	Dynamo	1993–1999, 2009–2012	6	0	0	0	0	6
9	(Ukraine) Andriy Vorobey	Shakhtar	1995–2007	4	2	0	0	0	6
9	(Ukraine) Oleh Husiev	Dynamo	2003–2018	3 (2)	1	2 (1)	0	0	6
9	(Brazil) Jádson	Shakhtar	2005–2011	5 (1)	0	0	1	0	6
9	(Brazil) Luiz Adriano	Shakhtar	2007–2015	4	2	0	0	0	6
9	(Brazil) Eduardo	Shakhtar	2010–2014, 2015–2016	3	3	0	0	0	6
9	(Brazil) Júnior Moraes	Dynamo; Shakhtar	2015–2018; 2018–2022	1; 3	0; 1	0; 1	0; 0	0; 0	6
19	(Russia) Petro Laiko	Dynamo	1937–1940	5	0	0	0	0	5
19	(Ukraine) Vadym Yevtushenko	Dynamo	1980–1987, 1988	3 (1)	0	1	0	1	5
19	(Ukraine) Ihor Petrov	Shakhtar	1981–1991, 1994–1996, 1998	5 (2)	0	0	0	0	5
19	(Ukraine) Oleksandr Zavarov	Dynamo	1983–1988	4	0	0	0	1	5
19	(Poland) Mariusz Lewandowski	Shakhtar	2001–2010	3	1	1	0	0	5
19	(Brazil) Alan Patrick	Shakhtar	2011–2022	3	0	2	0	0	5
19	(Argentina) Facundo Ferreyra	Shakhtar	2013–2018	2	1	2	0	0	5
26	(Ukraine) Anatoliy Rodin	Shakhtar	1961–1965	4	0	0	0	0	4
26	(Ukraine) Volodymyr Muntyan	Dynamo	1965–1977	4	0	0	0	0	4
26	(Ukraine) Valeriy Yaremchenko	Shakhtar	1966–1978	3 (1)	1	0	0	0	4
26	(Russia) Volodymyr Veremeyev	Dynamo	1968–1982	4	0	0	0	0	4
26	(Ukraine) Yuriy Ananchenko	Shakhtar	1969–1973	4	0	0	0	0	4
26	(Byelorussian Soviet Socialist Republic) Vitaliy Starukhin	Shakhtar	1973–1981	3	1	0	0	0	4
26	(Ukraine) Serhiy Popov	Shakhtar	1992–1996, 1997–2004	3	1	0	0	0	4
26	(Ukraine) Viktor Leonenko	Dynamo	1992–1998	4	0	0	0	0	4
26	(Belarus) Valyantsin Byalkevich	Dynamo	1996–2008	2	1	1	0	0	4
26	(Uzbekistan) Maksim Shatskikh	Dynamo	1999–2009	3	1	0	0	0	4
26	(Croatia) Darijo Srna	Shakhtar	2003–2018	1	2	1	0	0	4
26	(Brazil) Fernandinho	Shakhtar	2005–2013	0	2	1	1	0	4
37	(Ukraine) Volodymyr Bogdanovych	Dynamo	1951–1956	3	0	0	0	0	3
37	(Russia) Ivan Fedosov	Shakhtar	1952–1960	3	0	0	0	0	3
37	(Ukraine) Viktor Kanevskyi	Dynamo	1954–1964	3	0	0	0	0	3
37	(Ukraine) Oleh Bazylevych	Dynamo; Shakhtar	1957–1966; 1967–1968	1; 2	0; 0	0; 0	0; 0	0; 0	3
37	(Ukraine) Viktor Serebryanikov	Dynamo	1959–1971	3	0	0	0	0	3
37	(Ukraine) Viktor Kolotov	Dynamo	1971–1981	3 (1)	0	0	0	0	3
37	(Ukraine) Leonid Buryak	Dynamo	1973–1984	3 (1)	0	0	0	0	3
37	(Russia) Serhiy Kravchenko	Shakhtar	1979–1981, 1984–1986	1 (1)	0	2	0	0	3
37	(Ukraine) Viktor Hrachov	Shakhtar	1980–1981, 1982–1990, 1994–1995	2	0	0	0	1	3
37	(Ukraine) Alexey Kobozev	Shakhtar	1988–1991	2	0	0	0	1	3
37	(Ukraine) Oleg Salenko	Dynamo	1989–1992	3	0	0	0	0	3
37	(Brazil) Kléber	Dynamo	2004–2009	2	1	0	0	0	3
37	(Guinea) Ismaël Bangoura	Dynamo	2007–2009	2	0	0	1	0	3
37	(Ukraine) Oleksandr Hladkyi	Shakhtar	2007–2010, 2014–2016	0	1	2	0	0	3
37	(Ukraine) Denys Harmash	Dynamo	2007–2023	1	1	1	0	0	3
37	(Ukraine) Taras Stepanenko	Shakhtar	2010–2025	2	1	0	0	0	3
37	(Croatia) Domagoj Vida	Dynamo	2013–2018	1	1	1	0	0	3
37	(Slovenia) Benjamin Verbič	Dynamo	2018–2022	3	0	0	0	0	3
37	(Uruguay) Carlos de Pena	Dynamo	2019–2022	2	0	1	0	0	3
37	(Ukraine) **Vitaliy Buyalskyi**	Dynamo	2010–Present	2	0	1	0	0	3
37	(Burkina Faso) **Lassina Traoré**	Shakhtar	2021–Present	3	0	0	0	0	3
58	(Russia) Viktor Shylovskyi	Dynamo	1934–1941	2	0	0	0	0	2
58	(Ukraine) Mykhailo Vasin	Shakhtar	1937–1939	2	0	0	0	0	2
58	(Ukraine) Georgy Bikezin	Shakhtar	1937–1941	2 (2)	0	0	0	0	2
58	(Ukraine) Anton Yakovlev	Shakhtar	1939–1940	2	0	0	0	0	2
58	(Ukraine) Pavlo Vinkovatov	Dynamo	1941–1955	2	0	0	0	0	2
58	(Russia) Georgy Ponomarev	Dynamo	1946–1951	2	0	0	0	0	2
58	(Ukraine) Viktor Kolesnikov	Shakhtar	1947, 1949–1952	2	0	0	0	0	2
58	(Czechoslovakia) Desideriy Tovt	Dynamo	1949–1951	2	0	0	0	0	2
58	(Ukraine) Viktor Fomin	Shakhtar; Dynamo	1949–1953; 1953–1959	1; 1	0; 0	0; 0	0; 0	0; 0	2
58	(Ukraine) Volodymyr Havrylenko	Shakhtar	1950–1951	2 (1)	0	0	0	0	2
58	(Ukraine) Aleksandr Ponomarev	Shakhtar	1951–1952	2	0	0	0	0	2
58	(Ukraine) Ivan Boboshko	Shakhtar	1952–1960	2	0	0	0	0	2
58	(Russia) Karpo Dubovytskyi	Shakhtar	1956–1957	2	0	0	0	0	2
58	(Russia) Adamas Golodets	Dynamo	1958–1959	2	0	0	0	0	2
58	(Ukraine) Yozhef Sabo	Dynamo	1959–1969	2 (1)	0	0	0	0	2
58	(Ukraine) Vasyl Turyanchyk	Dynamo	1959–1969	2	0	0	0	0	2
58	(Ukraine) Yury Kovalyov	Dynamo	1960	2	0	0	0	0	2
58	(Russia) Anatoliy Puzach	Dynamo	1965–1973	2	0	0	0	0	2
58	(Georgia (country)) Petras Glodenis	Shakhtar	1967–1968	2	0	0	0	0	2
58	(Ukraine) Oleksandr Boyko	Dynamo	1973–1983	1	0	1	0	0	2
58	(Russia) Volodymyr Lozynskyi	Dynamo	1976–1984	2	0	0	0	0	2
58	(Ukraine) Serhiy Morozov	Shakhtar	1978–1980, 1982–1986	1	1	0	0	0	2
58	(Ukraine) Volodymyr Yurchenko	Dynamo; Shakhtar	1981; 1987–1990	0; 1	0; 0	0; 0	0; 0	0; 1	2
58	(Ukraine) Serhiy Yashchenko	Shakhtar	1982–1995	1	0	0	0	1	2
58	(Russia) Yuriy Hulyayev	Dynamo; Shakhtar	1984–1985; 1986–1990	0; 1	0; 0	0; 0	0; 0	0; 1	2
58	(Ukraine) Oleh Protasov	Dynamo	1988–1990	2 (1)	0	0	0	0	2
58	(Ukraine) Serhiy Atelkin	Shakhtar	1989–1997, 2000–2002	1	1	0	0	0	2
58	(Ukraine) Pavlo Shkapenko	Dynamo	1992–1998	2 (1)	0	0	0	0	2
58	(Ukraine) Vitaliy Kosovskyi	Dynamo	1994–2003	2	0	0	0	0	2
58	(Ukraine) Dmytro Mykhaylenko	Dynamo	1994–2001	2	0	0	0	0	2
58	(Ukraine) Alyaksandr Khatskevich	Dynamo	1996–2004	1	1	0	0	0	2
58	(Ukraine) Anatoliy Tymoshchuk	Shakhtar	1998–2007	2	0	0	0	0	2
58	(Nigeria) Julius Aghahowa	Shakhtar	2000–2007, 2009–2012	2	0	0	0	0	2
58	(Ukraine) Oleksandr Melashchenko	Dynamo	2001–2003	2	0	0	0	0	2
58	(Senegal) Assane N'Diaye	Shakhtar	2001–2003	2	0	0	0	0	2
58	(Ukraine) Dmytro Chyhrynskyi	Shakhtar	2002–2009, 2010–2015, 2023	1	0	1	0	0	2
58	(Brazil) Elano	Shakhtar	2005–2007	0	1	1	0	0	2
58	(Ukraine) Taras Mykhalyk	Dynamo	2005–2013	0	0	2	0	0	2
58	(Ukraine) Oleksandr Kucher	Shakhtar	2006–2017	2	0	0	0	0	2
58	(Brazil) Ilsinho	Shakhtar	2007–2010	1	0	0	1	0	2
58	(Ukraine) Yaroslav Rakitskyi	Shakhtar	2009–2018, 2023–2024	1	1	0	0	0	2
58	(Armenia) Henrikh Mkhitaryan	Shakhtar	2010–2013	2	0	0	0	0	2
58	(Brazil) Dentinho	Shakhtar	2011–2022	2	0	0	0	0	2
58	(Brazil) Fred	Shakhtar	2013–2018	1	0	1	0	0	2
58	(Ukraine) Oleksandr Zubkov	Shakhtar	2014–2020, 2022–2025	2	0	0	0	0	2
58	(Brazil) Marcos Antônio	Shakhtar	2019–2022	2	0	0	0	0	2
58	(Luxembourg) Gerson Rodrigues	Dynamo	2019–2025	1	0	1	0	0	2
58	(Ukraine) Vladyslav Vanat	Dynamo	2021–2025	2	0	0	0	0	2
58	(Brazil) **Eguinaldo**	Shakhtar	2023–Present	2	0	0	0	0	2
107	(Ukraine) Hryhoriy Balaba	Shakhtar	1937–1940	1	0	0	0	0	1
107	(Russia) Boris Afanasiev	Dynamo	1938–1940	1	0	0	0	0	1
107	(Ukraine) Hryhoriy Nesmekha	Shakhtar	1938–1941	1	0	0	0	0	1
107	(Russia) Pavel Komarov	Dynamo	1933–1934, 1936–1941	1	0	0	0	0	1
107	(Ukraine) Mykola Krasyuk	Shakhtar	1940	1	0	0	0	0	1
107	(Czechoslovakia) Zoltan Senhetovskyi	Dynamo; Shakhtar	1948–1953; 1956–1957	1; 0	0; 0	0; 0	0; 0	0; 0	1
107	(Ukraine) Dmytro Ivanov	Shakhtar	1948, 1950–1951	1	0	0	0	0	1
107	(Ukraine) Viktor Leichenko	Shakhtar	1949	1	0	0	0	0	1
107	(Ukraine) Oleksandr Alpatov	Dynamo; Shakhtar	1950; 1951–1959	1; 0	0; 0	0; 0	0; 0	0; 0	1
107	(Ukraine) Leonid Savinov	Shakhtar; Dynamo	1950–1953, 1954; 1954	1; 0	0; 0	0; 0	0; 0	0; 0	1
107	(Georgia (country)) Andrei Zazroyev	Dynamo	1952–1955	1	0	0	0	0	1
107	(Ukraine) Myroslav Dumanskyi	Shakhtar	1953–1956	1	0	0	0	0	1
107	(Ukraine) Borys Lypskyi	Dynamo	1955–1956	1	0	0	0	0	1
107	(Ukraine) Vasyl Terentiev	Dynamo	1955	1	0	0	0	0	1
107	(Ukraine) Sergei Korshunov	Dynamo	1956–1957	1	0	0	0	0	1
107	(Ukraine) Yuriy Voynov	Dynamo	1956–1964	1	0	0	0	0	1
107	(Ukraine) Valentin Troyanovsky	Dynamo	1957–1964	1	0	0	0	0	1
107	(Ukraine) Volodymyr Sorokin	Dynamo; Shakhtar	1958–1959, 1960–1961; 1962–1967	0; 1	0; 0	0; 0	0; 0	0; 0	1
107	(Russia) Nikolai Parshin	Shakhtar	1958	1	0	0	0	0	1
107	(Ukraine) Mykola Holovko	Shakhtar	1960–1969	1	0	0	0	0	1
107	(Ukraine) Vladimir Salkov	Shakhtar	1960–1968	1	0	0	0	0	1
107	(Ukraine) Fedir Medvid	Dynamo	1962–1972	1	0	0	0	0	1
107	(Ukraine) Mykhailo Ivanov	Shakhtar	1963	1	0	0	0	0	1
107	(Ukraine) Vitaliy Drovetskyi	Dynamo	1964–1966	1	0	0	0	0	1
107	(Lithuanian Soviet Socialist Republic) Benjaminas Zelkevičius	Shakhtar	1968	1	0	0	0	0	1
107	(Ukraine) Oleksandr Koltsov	Dynamo; Shakhtar	1953–1959; 1959–1960	1 (1); 0	0; 0	0; 0	0; 0	0; 0	1
107	(Moldavian Soviet Socialist Republic) Dmitry Mizerny	Shakhtar	1961–1966	1	0	0	0	0	1
107	(Ukraine) Volodymyr Onyshchenko	Dynamo	1962–1969	1	0	0	0	0	1
107	(Ukraine) Yuriy Vankevych	Dynamo; Shakhtar	1965–1970; 1973–1977	0; 1	0; 0	0; 0	0; 0	0; 0	1
107	(Ukraine) Oleg Kolosov	Shakhtar	1960–1963	1	0	0	0	0	1
107	(Lithuanian Soviet Socialist Republic) Antanas Stankevicius	Shakhtar	1965–1968	1	0	0	0	0	1
107	(Ukraine) Yuriy Hubych	Shakhtar	1965–1974	1	0	0	0	0	1
107	(Ukraine) Anatoliy Konkov	Shakhtar; Dynamo	1968–1974; 1975–1981	0; 1	0; 0	0; 0	0; 0	0; 0	1
107	(Ukraine) Oleksandr Damin	Dynamo	1969–1976	1	0	0	0	0	1
107	(Ukraine) Yuriy Hubych	Shakhtar	1965–1974	1	0	0	0	0	1
107	(Ukraine) Viktor Matviyenko	Dynamo	1970–1977	1	0	0	0	0	1
107	(Ukraine) Valeriy Horbunov	Shakhtar	1972–1982	1	0	0	0	0	1
107	(Russia) Volodymyr Safonov	Shakhtar	1972–1980	1	0	0	0	0	1
107	(Ukraine) Mykhaylo Sokolovskyi	Shakhtar	1974–1987	0	0	1	0	0	1
107	(Ukraine) Volodymyr Rohovsky	Shakhtar	1975–1982	1	0	0	0	0	1
107	(Ukraine) Volodymyr Bezsonov	Dynamo	1976–1990	1 (1)	0	0	0	0	1
107	(Kazakh Soviet Socialist Republic) Aleksandr Khapsalis	Dynamo	1976–1982	1	0	0	0	0	1
107	(Ukraine) Viktor Kaplun	Dynamo	1978–1980	1	0	0	0	0	1
107	(Ukraine) Serhiy Zhuravlyov	Dynamo; Shakhtar	1979–1984; 1985	1; 0	0; 0	0; 0	0; 0	0; 0	1
107	(Ukraine) Viktor Khlus	Dynamo	1980–1985	1	0	0	0	0	1
107	(Ukraine) Vadym Karatayev	Dynamo	1980–1981, 1982–1987	0	0	0	0	1	1
107	(Ukraine) Hryhoriy Pasichnyi	Dynamo	1982–1983	1	0	0	0	0	1
107	(Ukraine) Syarhey Herasimets	Dynamo; Shakhtar	1983–1984; 1986–1988	0; 0	0; 0	0; 0	0; 0	0; 1	1
107	(Ukraine) Vasyl Yevseyev	Dynamo	1983–1987, 1993–1994	1 (1)	0	0	0	0	1
107	(Ukraine) Oleksandr Shcherbakov	Dynamo	1986	0	0	1	0	0	1
107	(Ukraine) Serhiy Ralyuchenko	Shakhtar	1987	0	0	0	0	1	1
107	(Ukraine) Mykhaylo Stelmakh	Dynamo; Shakhtar	1988–1989; 1991	0; 0	0; 0	0; 0	0; 0	1; 0	1
107	(Ukraine) Anatoliy Demyanenko	Dynamo	1979–1991, 1992–1993	0	1	0	0	0	1
107	(Ukraine) Oleksiy Mykhaylychenko	Dynamo	1981–1990	1	0	0	0	0	1
107	(Ukraine) Vasyl Rats	Dynamo	1981–1989, 1989–1990	1	0	0	0	0	1
107	(Ukraine) Valeriy Hoshkoderya	Shakhtar	1981, 1984–1990	1	0	0	0	0	1
107	(Ukraine) Oleh Smolyaninov	Shakhtar	1983–1989	1	0	0	0	0	1
107	(Ukraine) Ivan Yaremchuk	Dynamo	1985–1990	1	0	0	0	0	1
107	(Ukraine) Serhiy Zayets	Dynamo	1986–1993	1	0	0	0	0	1
107	(Ukraine) Serhiy Shmatovalenko	Dynamo	1987–1998	1	0	0	0	0	1
107	(Ukraine) Hennadiy Lytovchenko	Dynamo	1988–1990	1	0	0	0	0	1
107	(Ukraine) Ihor Leonov	Shakhtar	1988–2001, 1993–2000	1	0	0	0	0	1
107	(Ukraine) Serhiy Bezhenar	Dynamo	1989, 1995–1998	1	0	0	0	0	1
107	(Ukraine) Oleh Luzhnyi	Dynamo	1989–1999	1	0	0	0	0	1
107	(Ukraine) Oleh Matvyeyev	Dynamo; Shakhtar	1989–1992; 1992–2000	0; 1	0; 0	0; 0	0; 0	0; 0	1
107	(Ukraine) Andriy Annenkov	Dynamo	1990–1994	1	0	0	0	0	1
107	(Ukraine) Yuriy Hritsyna	Dynamo	1990–1994	1	0	0	0	0	1
107	(Ukraine) Valeriy Kryventsov	Shakhtar	1991–2001	1	0	0	0	0	1
107	(Lithuania) Igoris Pankratjevas	Dynamo	1992	1	0	0	0	0	1
107	(Ukraine) Serhiy Kovalyov	Dynamo; Shakhtar	1992–1993; 1994–2000	0; 1	0; 0	0; 0	0; 0	0; 0	1
107	(Ukraine) Serhiy Mizin	Dynamo	1992–1996	1	0	0	0	0	1
107	(Ukraine) Yuriy Maksymov	Dynamo	1995–1997	1	0	0	0	0	1
107	(Ukraine) Yevhen Pokhlebayev	Dynamo	1995–1997	1	0	0	0	0	1
107	(Ukraine) Andrei Fedkov	Shakhtar	1995–1996	1	0	0	0	0	1
107	(Ukraine) Oleksandr Ostashov	Shakhtar	1995–1996	1	0	0	0	0	1
107	(Ukraine) Andriy Nesmachnyi	Dynamo	1997–2011	1	0	0	0	0	1
107	(Ukraine) Oleksiy Byelik	Shakhtar	1998–2008	1	0	0	0	0	1
107	(Ukraine) Oleksiy Hai	Shakhtar	2000–2013	0	1	0	0	0	1
107	(Hungary) László Bodnár	Dynamo	2000–2004	1	0	0	0	0	1
107	(Romania) Florin Cernat	Dynamo	2001–2009	1	0	0	0	0	1
107	(Brazil) Brandão	Shakhtar	2002–2009	1 (1)	0	0	0	0	1
107	(Croatia) Jerko Leko	Dynamo	2002–2006	1	0	0	0	0	1
107	(Latvia) Māris Verpakovskis	Dynamo	2003–2011	1	0	0	0	0	1
107	(Brazil) Rodolfo	Dynamo	2004–2006	1	0	0	0	0	1
107	(Romania) Ciprian Marica	Shakhtar	2004–2007	1	0	0	0	0	1
107	(Serbia) Igor Duljaj	Shakhtar	2004–2010	1	0	0	0	0	1
107	(Serbia) Marjan Marković	Dynamo	2005–2008	0	0	1	0	0	1
107	(Ukraine) Serhiy Tkachenko	Shakhtar	2006–2008	0	0	1	0	0	1
107	(Senegal) Pape Diakhaté	Dynamo	2007–2011	0	0	1	0	0	1
107	(Brazil) Willian	Shakhtar	2007–2013	1	0	0	0	0	1
107	(Ukraine) **Oleksandr Karavayev**	Shakhtar; Dynamo	2009–2017; 2019–Present	0; 1	0; 0	0; 0	0; 0	0; 0	1
107	(Brazil) Douglas Costa	Shakhtar	2010–2015	0	1	0	0	0	1
107	(Ukraine) Serhiy Kryvtsov	Shakhtar	2010–2022	1	0	0	0	0	1
107	(Ukraine) Serhiy Rybalka	Dynamo	2010–2018	1	0	0	0	0	1
107	(Nigeria) Taye Taiwo	Dynamo	2012–2013	0	1	0	0	0	1
107	(Ukraine) Serhiy Sydorchuk	Dynamo	2013–2023	1	0	0	0	0	1
107	(Brazil) Bernard	Shakhtar	2013–2018	0	0	1	0	0	1
107	(Morocco) Younès Belhanda	Dynamo	2013–2017	1	0	0	0	0	1
107	(Brazil) Wellington Nem	Shakhtar	2013–2020	1	0	0	0	0	1
107	(Ukraine) Artem Byesyedin	Dynamo	2013–2023	1	0	0	0	0	1
107	(Democratic Republic of the Congo) Dieumerci Mbokani	Dynamo	2013–2018	1	0	0	0	0	1
107	(Ukraine) Volodymyr Shepelyev	Dynamo	2014–2024	1	0	0	0	0	1
107	(Ukraine) Mykyta Burda	Dynamo	2014–2023	1	0	0	0	0	1
107	(Ukraine) Viktor Kovalenko	Shakhtar	2014–2021	1	0	0	0	0	1
107	(Ukraine) Oleksandr Andriyevskyi	Dynamo	2015–2024	1	0	0	0	0	1
107	(Ukraine) Viktor Tsyhankov	Dynamo	2016–2023	1	0	0	0	0	1
107	(Ukraine) **Denys Popov**	Dynamo	2017–Present	1	0	0	0	0	1
107	(Ukraine) **Mykola Shaparenko**	Dynamo	2017–Present	1	0	0	0	0	1
107	(Ukraine) Mykhailo Mudryk	Shakhtar	2018–2023	1	0	0	0	0	1
107	(Spain) Fran Sol	Dynamo	2019–2023	1	0	0	0	0	1
107	(Brazil) Tetê	Shakhtar	2019–2023	1	0	0	0	0	1
107	(Ukraine) Yevhen Konoplyanka	Shakhtar	2019–2021	1	0	0	0	0	1
107	(Ukraine) Danylo Sikan	Shakhtar	2019–2025	1	0	0	0	0	1
107	(Ukraine) **Artem Bondarenko**	Shakhtar	2020–Present	1	0	0	0	0	1
107	(Ukraine) **Heorhiy Sudakov**	Shakhtar	2020–Present	1	0	0	0	0	1
107	(Ukraine) **Vladyslav Kabayev**	Dynamo	2022–Present	1	0	0	0	0	1
107	(Brazil) **Newerton**	Shakhtar	2023–Present	1	0	0	0	0	1
107	(Brazil) Kevin	Shakhtar	2024–2025	1	0	0	0	0	1
107	(Panama) **Eduardo Guerrero**	Dynamo	2024–Present	0	1	0	0	0	1
107	(Brazil) **Kauã Elias**	Shakhtar	2025–Present	0	1	0	0	0	1
107	(Brazil) **Luca Meirelles**	Shakhtar	2025–Present	0	1	0	0	0	1
107	(Brazil) **Lucas Ferreira**	Shakhtar	2025–Present	1	0	0	0	0	1
107	(Venezuela) **Gleiker Mendoza**	Shakhtar	2026–Present	0	1	0	0	0	1
107	(Brazil) **Isaque**	Shakhtar	2025–Present	0	1	0	0	0	1
107	(Brazil) **Alisson**	Shakhtar	2025–Present	0	1	0	0	0	1

=== List of own goals ===
As of match played 3 May 2026

Key
(X)	Number of times player scored an own goal (only for players with multiple own goal)

Date	Player	Playing For	Goal For	H/A/N	Res.	Competition	Ref.
6 October 1940	(Ukraine) Mykola Krasyuk	Shakhtar	Dynamo	A	1–1	Soviet Top League	
22 June 1950	(Ukraine) Abram Lerman	Dynamo	Shakhtar	H	4–1	Soviet Top League	
27 July 1968	(Ukraine) Oleksandr Pollak	Shakhtar	Dynamo	H	2–3	Soviet Top League	
10 September 1970	(Ukraine) Oleksiy Drozdenko	Shakhtar	Dynamo	A	3–0	Soviet Top League	
22 April 1978	(Ukraine) Anatoliy Konkov	Dynamo	Shakhtar	H	1–2	Soviet Top League	
3 June 2002	(Ukraine) Serhiy Fedorov	Dynamo	Shakhtar	A	2–0	Vyshcha Liha	
3 June 2002	(Serbia) Goran Gavrančić	Dynamo	Shakhtar	A	2–0	Vyshcha Liha	
21 May 2003	(Ukraine) Adrian Pukanych	Shakhtar	Dynamo	A	2–1	Vyshcha Liha	
30 April 2009	(Ukraine) Dmytro Chyhrynskyi	Shakhtar	Dynamo	A	1–1	UEFA Cup	
15 May 2014	(Ukraine) Oleksandr Kucher	Shakhtar	Dynamo	N	2–1	Ukrainian Cup	
12 December 2016	(Ukraine) Yevhen Khacheridi	Dynamo	Shakhtar	H	3–4	Ukrainian Premier League	
12 December 2016	(Ukraine) Yevhen Khacheridi (2)	Dynamo	Shakhtar	H	3–4	Ukrainian Premier League	
3 May 2026	(Ukraine) Vladyslav Kabayev	Dynamo	Shakhtar	A	3–1	Ukrainian Premier League	

=== List of hat-tricks ===
As of match played 3 May 2026

Key
(X)	Number of times player scored a hat-trick (only for players with multiple hat-tricks)
**4**	Player scored four goals
**5**	Player scored five goals
**6**	Player scored six goals

#	Player	G	For	H/A/N	Res.	Date	Competition	Ref.
1	(Ukraine) Volodymyr Bogdanovych	**3**	Dynamo	A	0–4	25 July 1952	Soviet Top League	
2	(Ukraine) Valeriy Yaremchenko	**3**	Shakhtar	A	4–3	18 August 1971	Soviet Top League	
3	(Ukraine) Ihor Petrov	**3**	Shakhtar	H	3–3	11 September 1986	Soviet Top League	
4	(Ukraine) Igor Belanov	**3**	Dynamo	H	4–1	3 December 1986	Soviet Top League	

== Crossing the divide ==
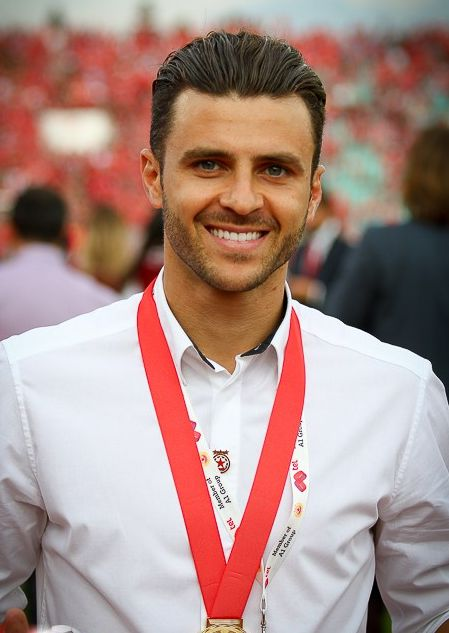
Júnior Moraes (in 2018)

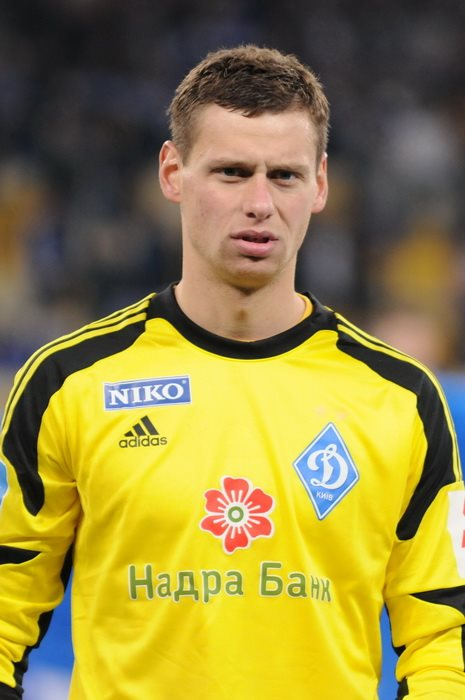
Oleksandr Rybka (in 2014)

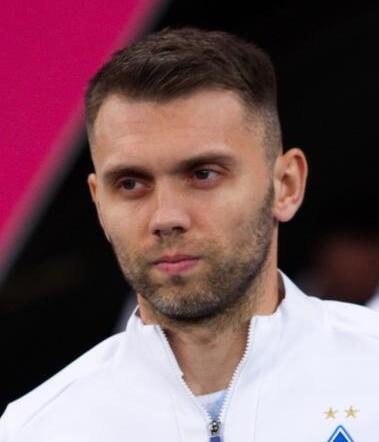
Oleksandr Karavayev (in 2021)

=== Soviet Union ===
In bold are players who transferred directly from one club to the other.

Shakhtar then Dynamo

- 1934: (Soviet Union) Viktor Shylovskyi (from Dynamo Stalino to Dynamo Kyiv)
- 1953: (Soviet Union) **Viktor Fomin**
- 1965: (Soviet Union) **Vitaliy Khmelnytskyi**
- 1975: (Soviet Union) **Anatoliy Konkov**
- 1976: (Soviet Union) **Viktor Zvyahintsev**
- 1982: (Soviet Union) **Viktor Chanov**

Dynamo then Shakhtar

- 1967: (Soviet Union) Valeriy Lobanovskyi
- 1977: (Soviet Union) **Viktor Zvyahintsev**
- 1990: (Soviet Union) Andriy Kovtun (have not played a single game in Dynamo)

=== Ukraine ===
Since Ukrainian independence, there had been only three direct transfer moves in each direction (Dynamo to Shakhtar, Shakhtar to Dynamo). Most of the direct transfers, however, took place in the 1990s, when the rivalry between the clubs was virtually non-existent.

In bold are players who transferred directly from one club to the other.

Shakhtar then Dynamo

- 1992: (Ukraine) **Serhii Rebrov**
- 1992: (Ukraine) **Andriy Kovtun**
- 2008: (Nigeria) Emmanuel Okoduwa (have not played a single game for Dynamo)
- 2016: (Ukraine) **Oleksandr Hladkyi**
- 2019: (Ukraine) Oleksandr Karavayev (have not played a single game for Shakhtar)

Dynamo then Shakhtar

- 1992: (Ukraine) **Oleh Matvyeyev**
- 1998: (Ukraine) **Volodymyr Kovalyuk**
- 2007: (Ukraine) Volodymyr Yezerskiy
- 2011: (Ukraine) Oleksandr Rybka
- 2014: (Ukraine) Rustam Khudzhamov (have not played a single game for Dynamo)
- 2018: (Ukraine) Oleksiy Shevchenko (have not played a single game for Dynamo)
- 2018: (Ukraine) **Júnior Moraes**
