= List of captains of Dynamo Kyiv =

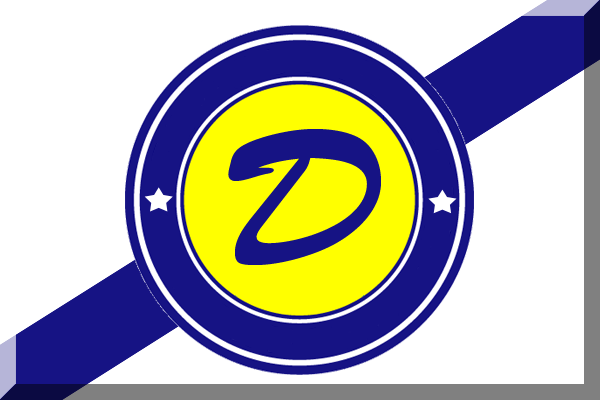
Fantasy flag of Dynamo Kyiv

List of captains of the Ukrainian football club Dynamo Kyiv.

No.	Seasons	Captain	Period of captaincy (seasons)
1	1928	SUN Mykola Murashov	1
2	1929–1931	SUN Kazimir Piontkovskiy	3
3	1932	SUN Valentin Prokofyev	1
4	1933–1941	SUN Kostyantyn Shchegodski	9
5	1935–1936	SUN Kostyantyn Fomin	2
6	1937–1946	SUN Mykola Makhynya	10
7	1937–1940	SUN Petro Layko	4
8	1941	SUN Viktor Shilovskiy	1
9	1946	SUN Mykola Kuznetsov	1
10	1947	SUN Oleksandr Shevtsov	1
11	1947–1953	SUN Abram Lerman	7
12	1948	SUN Pyotr Dementyev	1
13	1948–1950	SUN Pavlo Winkovatov	3
14	1948	SUN Oleksandr Prynts	1
15	1950	SUN Dezyderiy Tovt	1
16	1950–1951	SUN Fedir Dashkov	2
17	1952–1954	SUN Mykhaylo Mykhalyna	3
18	1953–1955	SUN Andrei Zazroyev	3
19	1954	SUN Mykhaylo Koman	1
20	1955	SUN Arkadiy Larionov	1
21	1955–1957	SUN Viktor Fomin	3
22	1957–1959	SUN Vitaliy Holubyev	3
23	1958–1960	SUN Yuriy Voynov	3
24	1959	SUN Volodymyr Anufriyenko	1
25	1960–1969	SUN Vasyl Turyanchyk	10
26	1961–1964	SUN Viktor Kanevskiy	4
27	1961–1971	SUN Viktor Serebryanikov	10
28	1962	SUN Boris Vysotskiy	1
29	1963	SUN Valeriy Lobanovskiy	1
30	1965–1967	SUN Andriy Biba	3
31	1969	SUN Volodymyr Veremeyev	1
32	1970	SUN Fedir Medvid	1
33	1970	SUN Yuriy Vankevych	1
34	1970–1972	SUN Vadym Sosnykhin	3
35	1971	SUN Anatoliy Byshovets	1
36	1971	SUN Yevhen Rudakov	1
37	1971–1973	SUN Volodymyr Muntyan	3
38	1972–1973	SUN Anatoliy Puzach	2
39	1972–1980	SUN Viktor Kolotov	9
40	1973	SUN Volodymyr Troshkin	1
41	1974–1977	SUN Mykhaylo Fomenko	4
42	1974	SUN Oleksandr Boyko	1
43	1976	SUN Vyacheslav Kochubynskiy	1
44	1976–1984	SUN Oleh Blokhin	9
45	1977–1981	SUN Anatoliy Konkov	5
46	1980–1984	SUN Volodymyr Bezsonov	5
47	1982–1983	SUN Leonid Buryak	2
48	1983–1990	SUN Anatoliy Demyanenko	8
49	1983–1986	SUN Serhiy Baltacha	4
50	1986	SUN Andriy Bal	1
51	1987	SUN Oleksandr Zavarov	1
52	1987	SUN Oleksiy Mykhailychenko	1
53	1989–1990	SUN Oleh Kuznetsov	2
54	1989–1990	SUN Hennadiy Lytovchenko	2
55	1991	SUN Serhiy Shmatovalenko	1
56	1991	SUN Akhrik Tsveyba	1
57	1992 - 199?/9?	UKR Oleh Luzhnyi	?
58	199?/9? - 199?/9?	UKR Serhiy Kovalets	?
59	199?/9? - 199?/9?	UKR Yuriy Maksymov	?
60	199?/9? - 1998	UKR Yuriy Kalitvintsev	?
61	199?/9? - 199?/99	RUS Aleksey Gerasimenko	?
62	1999/00 - 2000/01	UKR Oleksandr Holovko	2
63	2001/02 - 2002	UKR Vladyslav Vashchuk	2
64	2003 - 2005/06	BLR Valyantsin Byalkevich	3
65	2006/07 - 2007/08	UKR Serhii Rebrov	2
66	2008/09	UKR Oleksandr Shovkovskyi	1
67	2009/10	UKR Artem Milevskyi	1
68	2010/11 -	UKR Andriy Shevchenko	1
