= Holovko (surname) =

Holovko (Ukrainian: Головко) is a gender-neutral Ukrainian surname. It may refer to

- Oleksandr Holovko (born 1972), Ukrainian footballer
- Oleksandr Holovko (footballer, born 1995), Ukrainian footballer
- Mykhailo Holovko (born 1983), Ukrainian politician
- Mykola Holovko (1937–2004), Ukrainian footballer and coach
- Valeriy Holovko (born 1965), Ukrainian politician

== See also ==
- Golovko
