= Chynadiiovo =

Rural locality in Zakarpattia Oblast, Ukraine

Chynadiiovo Чинадійово Чинадієвe
- Rural settlement
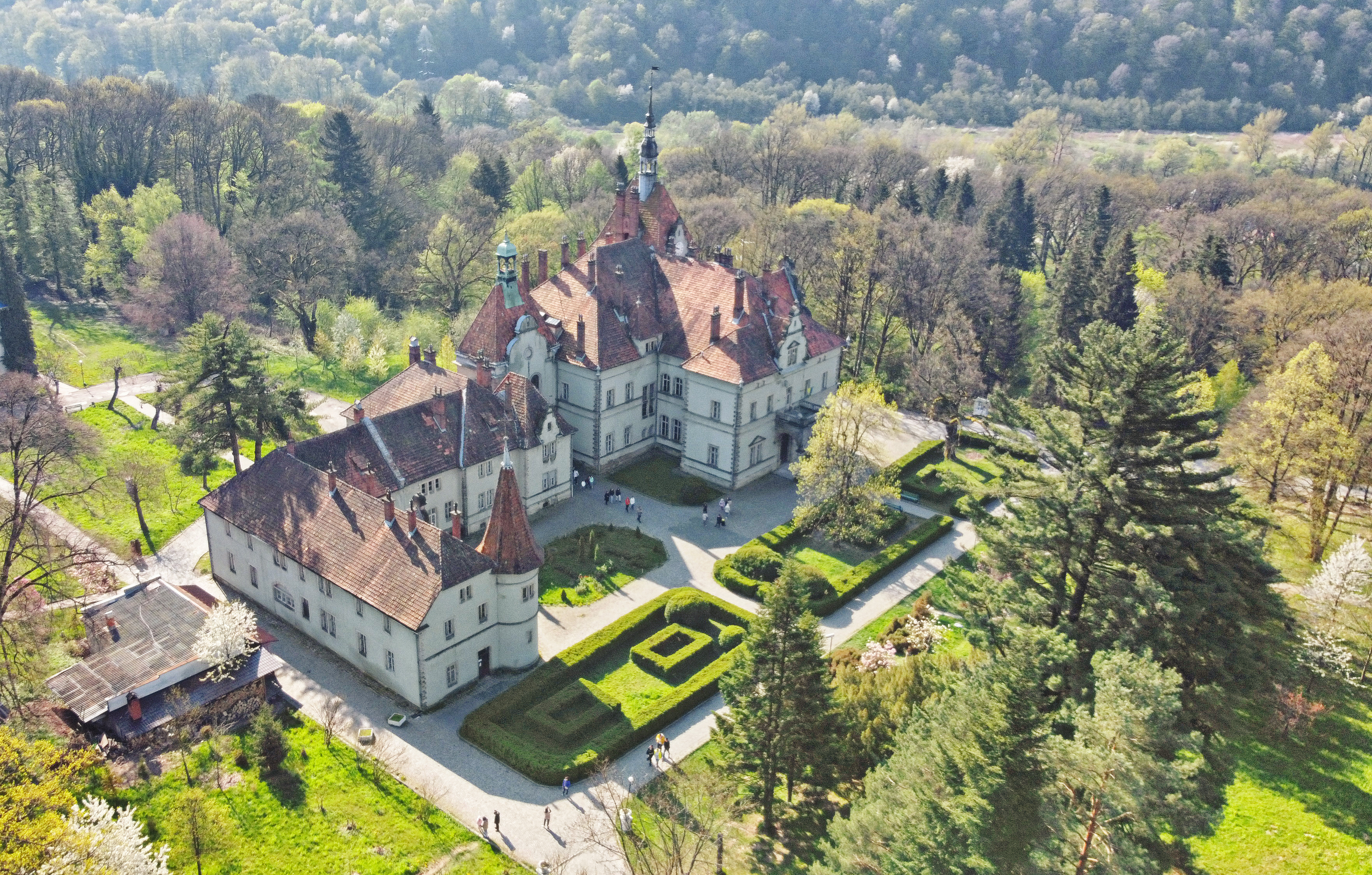
- Schönborn Palace in Chynadiiovo

- Flag
- Interactive map of Chynadiiovo
- Location within Zakarpattia Oblast Location within Ukraine
- Coordinates: 48.48°N 22.83°E
- Country: Ukraine
- Oblast: Zakarpattia Oblast
- Raion: Mukachevo Raion
- Hromada: Chynadiiovo settlement hromada
- Time zone: UTC+2 (EET)
  - Summer (DST): UTC+3 (EEST)

Chynadiiovo or Chynadiieve (Ukrainian: Чинадійово, Чинадієвe; Rusyn: Чинадійово; Hungarian: Szentmiklós; Russian: Чинадиев; Slovak: Činadno) is a rural settlement in Mukachevo Raion, Zakarpattia Oblast, Ukraine. It stands in the Latorica River valley, 10 kilometres (6.2 mi) from the town of Mukachevo. Its population is 6,688 (2022 estimate).

== History ==
The settlement took its Hungarian name from the church of St. Nicholas (Szentmiklós). Its history can be traced to the 13th century. King Béla IV presented the area to his son-in-law, Rostislav Mikhailovich, in 1247. It changed hands many times in the 14th century.

Péter Perényi, who owned Szentmiklós in the early 15th century, commenced building a castle. It suffered serious damage at the hands of Jerzy Sebastian Lubomirski's forces in 1657. The surviving edifice is the upshot of Francis I Rákóczi's rebuilding campaign.

After the defeat of Rákóczi's War for Independence Emperor Charles VI gave Mukachevo and Chynadiiovo to Archbishop Lothar Franz von Schönborn. A year later it passed to his nephew, Bishop Friedrich Karl von Schönborn-Buchheim.

The Schönborn era continued in Chynadiiovo well into the 20th century. The Mukachevo-Chynadiiovo estate was one of the largest in Eastern Europe. As of 1731, the estate comprised 200 villages and 4 towns, covering an area of some 2,400 km^{2}.

The town's most striking landmark is the hunting lodge of the Schönborns, the Beregvar Hunting Lodge, originally built of timber, but rebuilt as a large country residence to a fanciful revivalist design in the 1890s.

Until 26 January 2024, Chynadiiovo was designated urban-type settlement. On this day, a new law entered into force which abolished this status, and Chynadiiovo became a rural settlement.

== Notable people ==
- Vasyl Turyanchyk, Soviet footballer, FC Hoverla Uzhhorod player
