= Golovko =

Golovko (Russian: Головко) is a gender-neutral Russian surname of Ukrainian descent. It may refer to

- Aleksandr Golovko (born 1964), Russian major general
- Arseniy Golovko (1906–1962), Soviet admiral
- Kira Golovko (1919–2017), Russian theater and film actress

== See also ==
- Holovko (surname)
