= Viktor Kanevskyi =

Ukrainian footballer

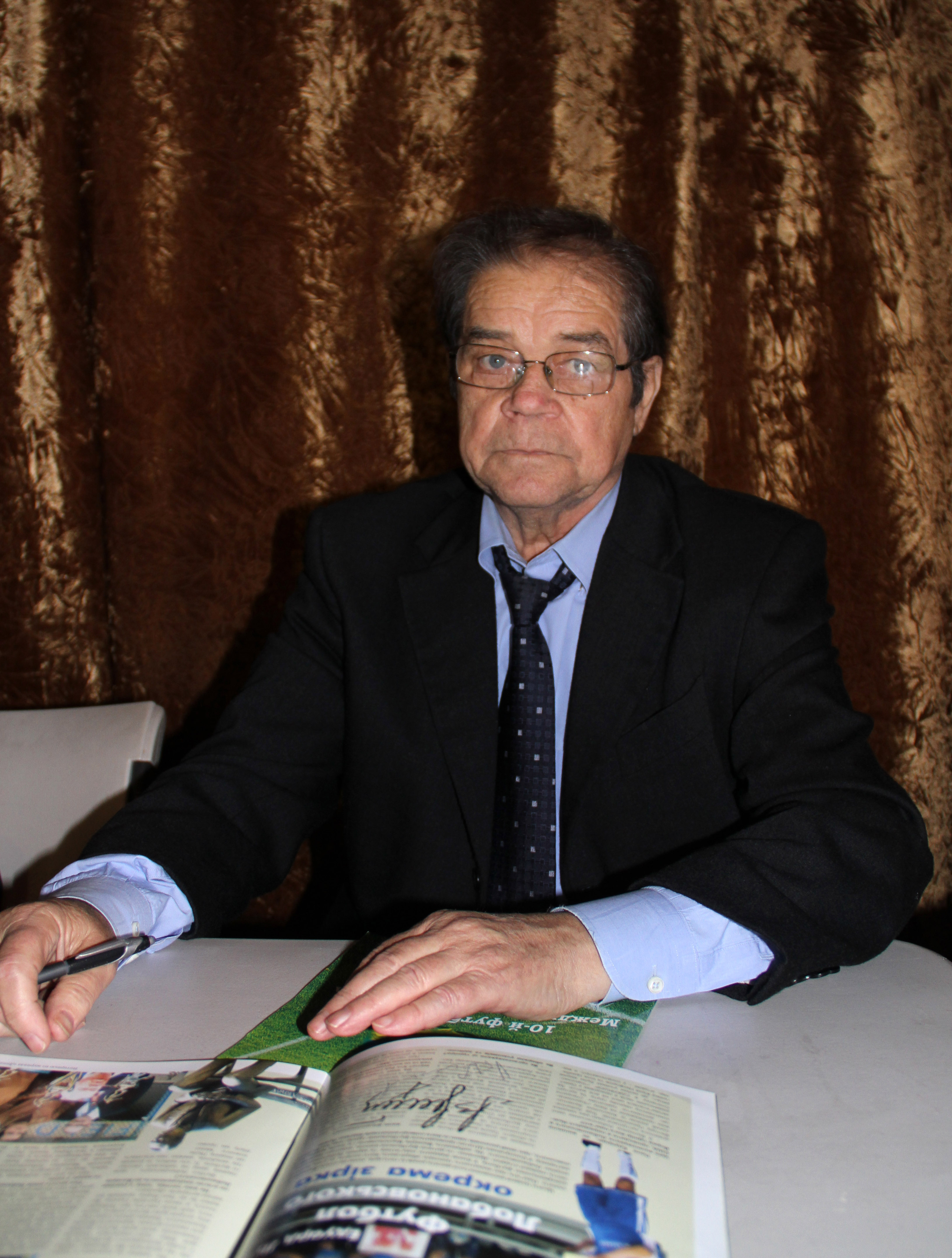

Personal information
- Full name: Viktor Izrailyovych Kanevskyi
- Date of birth: 3 October 1936
- Place of birth: Kyiv, Ukrainian SSR, Soviet Union
- Date of death: November 25, 2018 (aged 82)
- Place of death: Bristol, Connecticut, U.S.
- Height: 1.76 m (5 ft 9 1/2 in)
- Position: Striker

Youth career
- Yuny Dinamovets Kyiv

Senior career*
Years	Team	Apps	(Gls)
1952	FC Mashynobudivnyk Kyiv		
1954–1964	FC Dynamo Kyiv	195	(80)
1965–1966	FC Chornomorets Odesa	22	(6)

International career
1958–1962	USSR	5	(0)
1956	Ukraine	4	(0)

Managerial career
- 1965: FC Metalurh Zaporizhia
- 1966–1971: FC Metalist Kharkiv (Avanhard)
- 1973: FC Pakhtakor Tashkent (assistant)
- 1973–1977: FC Dnipro Dnipropetrovsk
- 1978: Ukraine U-19
- 1983–1986: FC Dynamo Irpin
- 1987: SC Tavriya Simferopol
- * Club domestic league appearances and goals

Viktor Izrailyovych (Illich) Kanevskyi (Ukrainian: Віктор Ізраїльович Каневський, Russian: Виктор Израилевич Каневский; 3 October 1936 – 25 November 2018) was a Ukrainian and Soviet football player and coach. He was Jewish. He was one of the first footballers from Ukraine who competed at the FIFA World Cup.

== Biography ==
After the World War II, the Kanevskyi family lived in the compound of the Saint Sophia Cathedral monastery, while the father of Viktor worked in the local Academy of Architecture located in the same monastery. Since his early years Kanevskyi was involved in various sports including ice skating, volleyball as well as football. During his student years he played for Kyiv's junior volleyball team. He also was invited by Dynamo's scout and junior team coach Mykhailo Korsunsky for try-outs.

Due to hardship in the postwar years, Kanevskyi started to work before his 16th birthday as a carver at the Kyiv Arsenal. At the factory he was making engravings on photo cameras in Kyiv. As a hobby he also played for a factory team, Mashynobudivnyk (predecessor of FC Arsenal Kyiv) that was coached by Iosif Livshyts. During that period Kanevskyi also played for Ukraine's junior team. After he worked as a mechanic at the Kyiv factory Transsignal and was forced to forget about playing.

In 1953 Kanevskyi received an invitation to play for FC Dynamo Kyiv. Kanevskyi appeared in Dynamo along with such players as Valeriy Lobanovskyi, Oleh Bazylevych, Valentyn Troyanovskyi, and others, with whom later in 1961 he became Soviet Top League winners and the first non-Moscow team to ever become Soviet League champions. Yet his first year in the club was not successful and in 1955 Kanevskyi played only one game. He later played in football competitions of the Kyiv city garrison for some military detachment team which served as a farm-team of Dynamo. At some point Dynamo's head coach Oleg Oshenkov wanted to let Kanevskyi go.

Due to being sick, in 1958 Kanevskyi was not able to go with Dynamo on a tour of Egypt. That same year the head coach of CDSA Vsevolod Bobrov invited him to join the Army team. Kanevskyi even arrived in Moscow and picked an apartment, but soon changed his mind. In 1960 Kanevskyi became a team captain and stayed in this position until he left the club.

Kanevskyi participated in the 1962 FIFA World Cup in Chile, about which he stated that it was of lower level in comparison to the UEFA Euro 1996 in England. Among the brightest highlights Kanevskyi mentioned about his meeting with Pelé, receiving a good monetary bonus and traveling back to Moscow by way of Paris. He also said that was able to receive an autograph from Pelé, while sitting next to him at the Brazil – Czechoslovakia final game. After the championship, Konstantin Beskov was placed in charge of the Soviet Union national football team and Kanevskyi was removed from the team.

In 1965 Dynamo received a new head coach, Viktor Maslov, after which Kanevskyi was replaced with Anatoliy Puzach. Kanevskyi explained that he had a chronic condition since 1957, "sand in the liver" (biliary sludge), and was regularly visiting a sanatorium in Karlovy Vary. Therefore, after the coming of Maslov, Kanevskyi felt that he would not be able to compete in the senior team. After leaving Dynamo, for about two or three months he worked as a head coach in Zaporizhia, but Yuriy Voinov who coached the newly promoted FC Chornomorets Odesa invited his former teammate to help with a team at the higher league.

In 1966 Kanevskyi decided to retire. After deciding to coach, Kanevskyi was advised to change his patronymic name Izarailyovych as it was not "blending with a policy of the CPSU and the Soviet state." His coaching career started out in Kharkiv. During a reorganization of the Soviet football competitions in 1970 Kanevskyi was able to keep FC Metalist Kharkiv at the second tier when at first Class A 2nd Group became Class A 1st Group and then First League. In 1968 and 1969 his team placed among the top three. Kanevskyi said that the club had good support from a factory director and had a contemporary stadium with "a visor." In transit through Chernivtsi where he spent about two months, Kanevskyi moved to Tashkent where he was invited by Vyacheslav Solovyov to be his assistant. In 1973 FC Pakhtakor Tashkent gained promotion to the Soviet Top League and Kanevskyi received the honorary title of Merited Coach of Uzbekistan (Uzbek SSR). In 1973 Valeriy Lobanovskyi asked Kanevskyi to take over his team, FC Dnipro Dnipropetrovsk, as he was leaving for FC Dynamo Kyiv. With Dnipro he reached the semifinals of the Soviet Cup and for four years was a manager in the Soviet Top League. In 1987 with SC Tavriya Simferopol, Kanevskyi was able to gain promotion to the Soviet First League.

From 1979 Kanevskyi worked in the Football Federation of Ukraine. That same year the Football Federation of the Soviet Union received a personal invitation for Kanevskyi to coach Algeria national football team. With him were supposed to depart Stanislav Zavidonov and Evgeni Rogov (the last two eventually did leave). With travel arrangements in place and a week to go, Kanevskyi was told that he was not going anywhere without any explanation. That was a last straw for him. Kanevskyi was appointed a senior coach for the Ukraine republican junior football team for the Pereprava tournament in Sukhumi where his team placed first. Yet when the federation still would not grant him the title of Merited Coach of Ukraine (Ukrainian SSR), Kanevskyi decided to act. He made an official request at the party organization about emigrating from the country. After a big scandal, Kanevskyi was excluded from the Communist Party of the Soviet Union. In about two weeks he was called to the chief of OVIR (Office for Visas and Registration) along with the Deputy Minister of Internal Affairs who announced that he wouldn't leave as he did not have sufficient degree of kinship. Later the secretary of the city party organization asked Kanevskyi to withdraw his request, promising to reverse all restrictions and reinstate him in the party, but Kanevskyi refused.

For the next few years, Kanevskyi felt he was being followed. His name was forbidden to be mentioned in print media. In historical materials commemorating the first big victories of Dynamo Kyiv, the Kanevskyi surname was not mentioned as he never captained in the club nor being on the Soviet team's roster at the 1962 FIFA World Cup. Kanevskyi was even removed from the photo of the 1961 Dynamos' winning squad. For a few years he was without a job, but later with his brother worked in construction at first building the Palace of Culture in Chernihiv Oblast and later in Moscow a cooperative house.

In 1983 there was a new club established in Irpin Dynamo as a farm club of FC Dynamo Kyiv. With the help of Valeriy Lobanovskyi, Kanevskyi was appointed its head coach.

In 1988 there appeared information that anybody was allowed to emigrate from the Soviet Union. Kanevskyi only waited four months after filing his request and on 15 November 1988 he and his wife left the country, traveling to New York through Austria and Italy. After arrival in the United States, Kanevskyi was able to find a job as a coach at a sports school in New York held by Russian emigrants, where he headed the football department. Later he opened his own football school.

== Professional football player career ==
=== Clubs ===
Club	Season	League		Cup		Total	
Club	Season	Apps	Goals	Apps	Goals	Apps	Goals
Dynamo	1954	–	–	–	–	–	–
Dynamo	1955	1	0	–	–	1	0
Dynamo	1956	12	4	–	–	12	4
Dynamo	1957	13	5	2	0	15	5
Dynamo	1958	18	8	1	0	19	8
Dynamo	1959	19	2	–	–	19	2
Dynamo	1960	23	7	–	–	23	7
Dynamo	1961	26	18	1	0	27	18
Dynamo	1962	23	7	1	0	24	7
Dynamo	1963	34	14	2	0	36	14
Dynamo	1964	27	15	6	5	33	20
Total Dynamo		196	80	13	5	209	85
Chornomorets	1965	17	6	–	–	17	6
Chornomorets	1966	5	0	–	–	5	0
Total Chornomorets		22	6	–	–	22	6
Grand total		218	86	13	5	231	91

=== International ===
National team	Year		
National team	Year	Apps	Goals
Soviet Union	1958	1	0
Soviet Union	1961	2	0
Soviet Union	1962	2	0

== Managerial statistics ==
Team	League	From	To	Record				
Team	League	From	To	P	W	D	L	Win %
Metalurh	Class A 2nd Group	1965		0	0	0	0	—
Metalist	Class A 2nd Group	1966	1969	0	0	0	0	—
Metalist	First League	1970	1971	0	0	0	0	—
Bukovyna	Second League	1972		0	0	0	0	—
Pakhtakor	First League	1973		0	0	0	0	—
Dnipro	Top League	1973	1977	0	0	0	0	—
Dynamo	Second League	1983	1986	0	0	0	0	—
Tavriya	Second League	1987		0	0	0	0	—

== Honors ==
As player

- Soviet Top League
  - Winner (1): 1961
  - Runners-up (1): 1960
- Soviet Cup
  - Winner (1): 1964

As manager

- Soviet First League
  - Runners-up (1): 1968 (Metalist)
- Soviet Second League / Championship of Ukraine
  - Winners (1): 1987 (Tavriya)
- Pereprava
  - Winners (1): 1978 (Ukraine)

== International career ==
Kanevskyi made his debut for the USSR on 30 August 1958 in a friendly game against Czechoslovakia. He participated in the 1962 FIFA World Cup.

In 1956 Kanevskyi played four games for Ukraine at the Spartakiad of the Peoples of the USSR.

== Anti-Semitism in Soviet Football ==
Kanevskyi pointed out several instances of anti-Semitism during his playing and coaching career in the Soviet Union.

One time Kanevskyi head-butted Anatoliy Fedotov who played for an Almaty team for calling him names. After that Kanevskyi was suspended for a game.

Kanevskyi also mentioned that even after being the Dynamos' captain for six years and winning one season, he was the only one who did not receive the title of Merited Master of Sports.

Later when Kanevskyi was coaching, he never received the title of Merited Coach of Ukraine, while in Uzbekistan he received a similar title for a single season as an assistant coach.
