= Boris Afanasiev =

Russian ice hockey player

Boris Ivanovitch Afanasiev (Russian: Борис Иванович Афанасьев; August 8, 1913 – 1983) was a Russian ice hockey goaltender, coach, and football player.

== Career ==
Afanasiev was first a football player. He played for CDKA Moscow from 1929 to 1933. He then played for Dukat Moscow in 1933, for Dynamo Bolshevo from 1934 to 1937, and for Dynamo Kiev from 1938 to 1941. He later returned to CDKA Moscow from 1944 to 1948. He won the Soviet Cup with CDKA Moscow in 1945, before winning the Soviet Top League with them a year later. In total, he scored three goals in 93 games played in the Soviet Top League.

In 1948, after finishing his football career, Afanasiev began playing ice hockey. He won the Soviet Championship League with the CDKA Moscow hockey team in 1948, 1949, and 1950. He was CDKA's goaltender along with Grigory Mkrtychan. He was inducted into the Russian and Soviet Hockey Hall of Fame in 1948.

After ending his ice hockey career in 1953, Afanasiev became a coach.
