= Yuriy Hulyayev =

Ukrainian footballer and manager (born 1963)

Personal information
- Full name: Yuriy Ivanovych Hulyayev
- Date of birth: 25 August 1963 (age 63)
- Place of birth: Buy, Kostroma Oblast, Soviet Union
- Height: 1.74 m (5 ft 8 1/2 in)
- Positions: Midfielder; defender

Youth career
- Tavriya football academy

Senior career*
Years	Team	Apps	(Gls)
1980–1983	SC Tavriya Simferopol	95	(4)
1984–1985	FC Dynamo Kyiv	0	(0)
1986–1990	FC Shakhtar Donetsk	44	(2)
1990–1993	FC Lokomotiv Nizhny Novgorod	53	(1)
1993	Kiskőrös-Spartacus		
1993	FC Chkalovets Novosibirsk	12	(0)
1993–1996	FC Druzhba Berdyansk	88	(6)
1996–1997	FC Torpedo-Viktoriya Nizhny Novgorod	18	(3)

International career
1983	Ukrainian SSR		

Managerial career
- 2001: FC Shakhtar-3 Donetsk
- * Club domestic league appearances and goals

Yuriy Ivanovych Hulyayev (Ukrainian: Юрій Іванович Гуляєв; Russian: Юрий Иванович Гуляев; born 25 August 1963) is a retired Ukrainian professional footballer. He made his professional debut in the Soviet First League in 1982 for SC Tavriya Simferopol.

In 1983 Hulyayev took part in the Summer Spartakiad of the Peoples of the USSR in the team of Ukrainian SSR.

== Honours ==
- Soviet Cup finalist: 1986.
