= Myroslav Dumanskyi =

Soviet and Ukrainian footballer (1929–1996)

Yaroslav Dumanskyi
Personal information
- Full name: Myroslav Ivanovych Dumanskyi
- Date of birth: 17 June 1929
- Place of birth: Stanisławów Voivodeship, Poland
- Date of death: 1 April 1996 (aged 66)
- Place of death: Ivano-Frankivsk, Ukraine
- Position: Midfielder

Senior career*
Years	Team	Apps	(Gls)
1951–1952	OBO Lviv	?	(?)
1953–1956	FC Shakhtar Stalino	72	(6)
1957–1962	FC Spartak Ivano-Frankivsk	184	(17)
	FC Naftovyk Dolyna	?	(?)

International career
1956	Ukraine	1	(0)

Managerial career
- FC Naftovyk Dolyna
- 1965–: FC Spartak Ivano-Frankivsk
- * Club domestic league appearances and goals

Myroslav Dumanskyi (Ukrainian: Мирослав Іванович Думанський, 17 June 1929 – 1 April 1996) was a Soviet, and later Ukrainian, football player and coach.

Born in Ivano-Frankivsk Oblast, Ukrainian SSR, he played for numerous Soviet teams, until his retirement as a player in 1963. From then he became a coach, first in the Soviet leagues, and then in the independent Ukrainian league; he continued to coach until his death in 1996.

In 1956 Dumanskyi played a game for Ukraine at the Spartakiad of the Peoples of the USSR.

Myroslav Dumansky is the father of Yaroslav Dumanskyi.
