= Mykhaylo Stelmakh (footballer) =

Ukrainian footballer and manager (1966–2025)

Mykhailo Stelmakh
Personal information
- Full name: Mykhailo Andriyovych Stelmakh
- Date of birth: 29 April 1966
- Place of birth: Zolochiv, Lviv Oblast, Ukrainian SSR, USSR
- Date of death: 13 January 2025 (aged 58)
- Height: 1.77 m (5 ft 10 in)
- Position: Midfielder

Senior career*
Years	Team	Apps	(Gls)
1985–1987	Dynamo Irpin	118	(12)
1988–1989	Dynamo Kyiv	12	(1)
1990	Halychyna Drohobych	23	(1)
1991	Shakhtar Donetsk	28	(0)
1991–1992	Spartak Subotica	0	(0)
1992–1994	Karpaty Lviv	30	(0)
1993	→ Evis Mykolaiv (loan)	7	(0)
1994	→ Boryspil (loan)	19	(1)
1994–1996	Vorskla Poltava	24	(1)
1995	→ CSKA-Borysfen Kyiv (loan)	17	(1)
1996–1998	CSKA Kyiv	22	(0)
1997–1998	→ CSKA-2 Kyiv	17	(1)

Managerial career
- 2000–2002: CSKA Kyiv (assistant)
- 2005–2008: Kharkiv (assistant)
- 2006: Kharkiv (caretaker)
- 2008–2010: Kharkiv
- 2011–2013: Poltava (assistant)
- 2014–2016: Dinaz Vyshhorod
- 2024–2025: Skala Stryi 1911 (assistant)
- * Club domestic league appearances and goals

Mykhailo Stelmakh (Ukrainian: Михайло Андрійович Стельмах; 29 April 1966 – 13 January 2025) was a Ukrainian football manager and player.

== Career ==
Born in Zolochiv, Lviv Oblast, Ukrainian SSR, Soviet Union, he played with Dynamo Kyiv and Shakhtar Donetsk in the Soviet First League. In 1992, he had a spell with Spartak Subotica in the First League of FR Yugoslavia before returning to, now independent, Ukraine and play with Karpaty Lviv, Vorskla Poltava and CSKA Kyiv.

After retiring he became a coach, first as assistant manager of CSKA Kyiv and Kharkiv and then main coach of Kharkiv between 2008 and 2010.

== Death ==
Stelmakh died on 13 January 2025, at the age of 58.

== Honours ==
Boryspil

- Ukrainian Second League: 1993–94

Vorskla Poltava

- Ukrainian First League: 1995–96

CSKA-Borysfen Kyiv

- Ukrainian Second League: 1995–96
