= Yury Kovalyov =

Soviet footballer

Personal information
- Full name: Yury Fyodorovich Kovalyov
- Date of birth: 6 February 1934
- Place of birth: Orekhovo-Zuyevo, USSR
- Date of death: 25 September 1979 (aged 45)
- Place of death: Moscow, USSR
- Positions: Striker; midfielder

Youth career
- Krasnoye Znamya Orekhovo-Zuyevo

Senior career*
Years	Team	Apps	(Gls)
1953	Krasnoye Znamya Gus-Krustalny		
1954–1959	FC Lokomotiv Moscow	122	(15)
1960	FC Dynamo Kyiv	19	(8)
1961	CSKA Moscow	24	(2)
1962–1965	FC Lokomotiv Moscow	112	(8)
1966	FC Metallurg Lipetsk		
1967–1971	Moskvich Moscow		

International career
1957	USSR	1	(0)
Medal record
Representing Soviet Union
UEFA European Championship
Winner	1960 France
- * Club domestic league appearances and goals

Yury Fyodorovich Kovalyov (Russian: Юрий Фёдорович Ковалёв; 6 February 1934 – 25 September 1979) was a Soviet footballer.

== International career ==
Kovalyov played his only game for USSR on 24 November 1957 in a 1958 FIFA World Cup qualifier against Poland. He was not selected for the final tournament squad. He was selected for the squad for the first ever European Nations' Cup in 1960, where the Soviets were champions, but did not play in any games at the tournament.
