= Nikolai Parshin =

Soviet footballer and manager

Personal information
- Full name: Nikolai Ivanovich Parshin
- Date of birth: 28 January 1929
- Place of birth: Moscow, Soviet Union
- Date of death: 16 December 2012 (aged 83)
- Place of death: Moscow, Russia
- Positions: Forward; midfielder

Youth career
- FC Spartak Moscow

Senior career*
Years	Team	Apps	(Gls)
1948	FC Zenit Tula		
1949	FC Torpedo Moscow	0	(0)
1949–1958	FC Spartak Moscow	106	(36)
1958	FC Shakhtyor Stalino	18	(4)
1959	FC Moldova Kishinyov	13	(2)
1960–1961	FC Shinnik Yaroslavl	40	(24)

International career
1955	USSR	1	(1)

Managerial career
- 1964: FC Torpedo Lipetsk
- 1965: FC Progress Zelenodolsk
- 1966–2005: FC Spartak Moscow (reserves and youth teams)
- * Club domestic league appearances and goals

Nikolai Ivanovich Parshin (Russian: Николай Иванович Паршин) (28 January 1929 – 16 December 2012) was a Soviet football player and manager. He was born in Moscow.

== Honours ==
- Soviet Top League winner: 1952, 1953, 1956.
- Soviet Cup winner: 1950.

== International career ==
Parshin played his only game for USSR on 21 August 1955, in a friendly against West Germany, scoring a goal in that game.
