= Viktor Kaplun =

Ukrainian and Soviet footballer

Personal information
- Full name: Viktor Hryhorovych Kaplun
- Date of birth: 5 May 1958 (age 68)
- Place of birth: Zaporizhia, Ukrainian SSR
- Height: 1.82 m (6 ft 0 in)
- Position: Defender

Senior career*
| Years | Team | Apps | (Gls) |
| 1976–1977 | FC Metalist Kharkiv | | |
| 1978–1980 | FC Dynamo Kyiv | 50 | (4) |
| 1982–1984 | FC Metalist Kharkiv | 82 | (0) |

International career
| 1980 | USSR | 1 | (0) |
Medal record
Men's football
Representing Soviet Union
FIFA U-20 World Cup
| Winner | 1977 Tunisia |
UEFA European Under-21 Championship
| Winner | 1980 Europe |
- * Club domestic league appearances and goals

Viktor Hryhorovych Kaplun (Ukrainian: Віктор Григорович Каплун, Russian: Виктор Григорьевич Каплун; born 5 May 1958 in Zaporizhia) is a retired Ukrainian and Soviet football player of Jewish ethnicity.

== Honours ==
Soviet Union

- 1977 FIFA World Youth Championship winner
- 1980 UEFA European Under-21 Football Championship winner

Dynamo Kyiv

- Soviet Top League winner: 1980, 1981.

Metalist Kharkiv

- Soviet Cup finalist: 1983

== International career ==
Kaplun played his only game for USSR on December 4, 1980 in a friendly against Argentina.
