= Oleh Smolyaninov =

Ukrainian footballer (born 1959)

Personal information
- Full name: Oleh Oleksiyovych Smolyaninov
- Date of birth: 5 January 1959 (age 67)
- Place of birth: Voroshylovsk, Ukrainian SSR
- Height: 1.78 m (5 ft 10 in)
- Position: Midfielder

Youth career
- Kommunarsk

Senior career*
| Years | Team | Apps | (Gls) |
| 1978 | Progress Kamensk-Shakhtinsky | | |
| 1978–1981 | Torpedo Taganrog | 24 | (8) |
| 1981–1982 | SKA Rostov-on-Don | 35 | (4) |
| 1983 | Kolos Nikopol | 20 | (5) |
| 1983–1989 | Shakhtar Donetsk | 138 | (16) |
| 1990 | Zenit Leningrad | 7 | (0) |
| 1990 | Dnipro Dnipropetrovsk | 6 | (0) |
| 1991–1992 | Tekstilshchik Kamyshin | 42 | (8) |
| 1992 | Metalurh Zaporizhzhia | 10 | (0) |
| 1992–1993 | FSV Wacker 90 Nordhausen | 19 | (2) |
| 1993–1994 | Zorya-MALS Luhansk | 5 | (0) |
| 1994 | Naftokhimik Kremenchuk | 11 | (1) |
| 1996 | Avanhard-Industria Rovenky | 2 | (0) |

Managerial career
- 1996–1997: Avanhard Rovenky
- 1997–1998: Shakhtar Makiivka
- 1999–2005: SKA-Energiya Khabarovsk
- 2006: Inter Baku
- 2008: Stal Alchevsk
- * Club domestic league appearances and goals

Oleh Oleksiyovych Smolyaninov (Ukrainian: Олег Олексійович Смолянинов; born 5 January 1959) is a Soviet and Ukrainian professional football coach and a former player.

== Career ==
Smolyaninov made his professional debut in the Soviet Second League in 1977 for FC Torpedo Taganrog. He played one game in the UEFA Cup 1990–91 for Dnipro Dnipropetrovsk.

== Honours ==
- Soviet Cup finalist: 1986
- USSR Federation Cup finalist: 1990
