= Viktor Fomin =

Ukrainian football player (1929–2007)

Personal information
- Full name: Viktor Trokhymovych Fomin
- Date of birth: 13 January 1929
- Place of birth: Sloviansk, Ukrainian SSR
- Date of death: 29 December 2007 (aged 78)
- Position: Striker

Youth career
- Lokomotiv Sloviansk

Senior career*
Years	Team	Apps	(Gls)
1948	Stal Zhdanov		
1949–1953	Shakhtyor Stalino	90	(24)
1953–1959	Dynamo Kyiv	121	(13)
1959–1960	Arsenal Kyiv	24	(7)
1960	Lokomotiv Vinnytsia	8	(1)

International career
1955–1957	USSR	3	(0)
1956	Ukraine	4	(1)

Managerial career
- 1970: Shakhtar Kadiivka
- 1973: Avanhard Sevastopol
- 1978: Spartak Ivano-Frankivsk
- 1981: SKA Kyiv (assistant)
- 1990: Okean Kerch (director)
- 1991: Okean Kerch
- * Club domestic league appearances and goals

Viktor Trokhymovych Fomin (Ukrainian: Віктор Троxимович Фомін, Russian: Виктор Трофимович Фомин; born 13 January 1929 in Sloviansk; died 29 December 2007) was a Ukrainian football player. Master of Sports of the USSR (1970). The first Ukrainian Player of the year (1950).

== Honours ==
- Soviet Cup winner: 1954.

== International career ==
Fomin made his debut for USSR on 26 June 1955 in an away friendly game against Sweden in Stockholm when he came out as substitute on the 41st minute (the Soviet Union won the game 6:0). He played in a 1958 FIFA World Cup qualifier, but was not selected to the final tournament squad. He also participated in the away game against Bulgaria (21 July 1955 USSR 4:0) and Finland at Dynamo Stadium in Moscow (27 July 1955 USSR 2:1). In Bulgaria he also came out as a substitute on the 25th minute while playing a full game against Finland. Fomin participated in one unofficial friendly on 27 February 1955 in India where the Soviet Union was victorious 3:0. He played all 90 minutes of play-time.

In 1956 Fomin played couple of games for Ukraine at the Spartakiad of the Peoples of the USSR.
