= Vasyl Turyanchyk =

Ukrainian footballer (1935–2022)

Personal information
- Full name: Vasyl Yuriyovych Turyanchyk
- Date of birth: 17 April 1935
- Place of birth: Chynadiyovo, Carpathian Ruthenia, Czechoslovakia
- Date of death: 31 March 2022 (aged 86)
- Height: 1.78 m (5 ft 10 in)
- Position: Defender

Youth career
- 1949–1952: Chervona Zirka Mukacheve
- 1952–1953: Iskra Mukacheve

Senior career*
| Years | Team | Apps | (Gls) |
| 1953–1954 | Spartak Uzhhorod | | |
| 1955–1957 | SKVO Lvov | 75 | (4) |
| 1958–1959 | Spartak Uzhhorod | 38 | (7) |
| 1959–1969 | Dynamo Kyiv | 308 | (12) |
| 1971 | Hoverla Uzhhorod | 44 | (3) |

Managerial career
- 1971: Hoverla Uzhhorod
- 1971–1978: Spartak Uzhhorod (academy, Mukacheve)
- 1979–1984: Irshava (academy)
- 1985–1987: FC Keramik Mukacheve (assistant)
- 1997–1999: FC Karpaty Mukacheve
- 2000–2002: Hoverla Uzhhorod (assistant)
- 2004–2006: Hoverla Uzhhorod (assistant)
- * Club domestic league appearances and goals

Vasyl Yuriyovych Turyanchyk (Ukrainian: Василь Юрійович Турянчик; 17 April 1935 – 31 March 2022) was a Ukrainian football player and coach who played as a defender.

== Honours ==
Dynamo Kyiv

- Soviet Top League: 1961, 1966, 1967, 1968
- Soviet Cup: 1964, 1966

Individual

- Ukrainian Footballer of the Year: 1967, 1968 (shared)
