= Viktor Serebryanikov =

Ukrainian footballer (1940–2014)

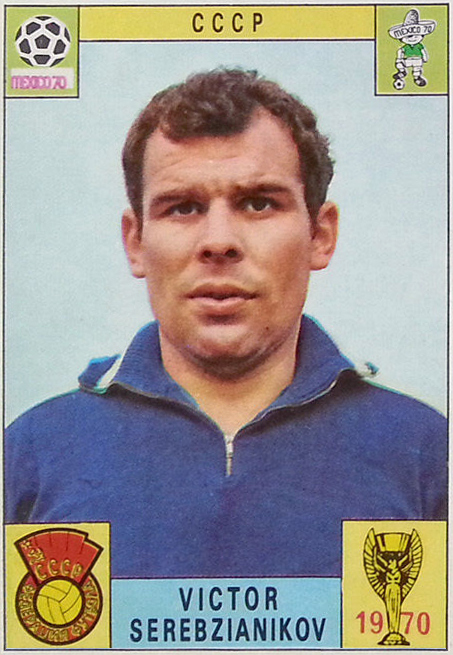

Personal information
- Full name: Viktor Petrovich Serebryanikov
- Date of birth: 29 March 1940
- Place of birth: Zaporizhia, Ukrainian SSR
- Date of death: 12 November 2014 (aged 74)
- Place of death: Kyiv, Ukraine
- Height: 1.73 m (5 ft 8 in)
- Positions: Midfielder; inside right

Youth career
- 1956–1958: FC Metalurh Zaporizhya

Senior career*
Years	Team	Apps	(Gls)
1958–1959	FC Metalurh Zaporizhya	39	(10)
1959–1971	FC Dynamo Kyiv	299	(70)
Total		338	(80)

International career
1963–1964	Soviet Union (Olympic)	5	(4)
1964–1970	Soviet Union	21	(3)

Managerial career
- 1973: FC Frunzenets Sumy
- 1977–1978: Nyva Pidhaitsi
- * Club domestic league appearances and goals

Viktor Petrovich Serebryanikov (Russian: Виктор Петрович Серебряников; Ukrainian: Віктор Петрович Серебряников, 29 March 1940 – 12 November 2014) also spelled Serebryannikov, was a Soviet association football player from Ukraine (at that time Ukrainian SSR). Serebrianikov was a member of the Dynamo's squad that for the first time won the Soviet championship title in 1961 becoming the first non-Moscow team to achieve that feat, so called "the first height".

In 1960s, Serebrianikov became admired in the Soviet football for his "ball's arc" (Russian: дуга Серебряникова) when the football after being hit was spinning in two planes. Later in interview he explained that the trick he picked in Brazil when the Soviet team was on tour.

After retiring from his playing career, Serebryanikov became the first head coach of Nyva Ternopil that started out from the collective farm "Path to the Communism" in the city of Pidhaitsi, Berezhany Raion in Ternopil Oblast in 1978.

He is considered as the first who received the Ukrainian Footballer of the Year award.

== Career statistics ==
=== Dynamo ===
Club	Season	League		Cup		Europe		Total	
Club	Season	Apps	Goals	Apps	Goals	Apps	Goals	Apps	Goals
Dynamo	1959	7	0	-	-	-	-	7	0
Dynamo	1960	18	8	-	-	-	-	18	8
Dynamo	1961	29	4	1	0	-	-	30	4
Dynamo	1962	20	7	-	-	-	-	20	7
Dynamo	1963	37	11	2	1	-	-	39	12
Dynamo	1964	29	3	5	1	-	-	34	4
Dynamo	1965	29	11	2	1	6	2	37	14
Dynamo	1966	15	2	2	0	-	-	17	2
Dynamo	1967	35	8	2	0	4	0	41	8
Dynamo	1968	34	7	-	-	-	-	34	7
Dynamo	1969	30	8	2	1	4	2	36	11
Dynamo	1970	15	1	1	0	-	-	16	1
Dynamo	1971	1	0	4	1	-	-	5	1
Total		299	70	21	5	14	4	334	79

- The statistics in USSR Cups and Europe is made under the scheme "autumn-spring" and enlisted in a year of start of tournaments

=== International ===
National team	Year		
National team	Year	Apps	Goals
Soviet Union	1964	3	1
Soviet Union	1965	–	–
Soviet Union	1966	6	1
Soviet Union	1967	–	–
Soviet Union	1968	–	–
Soviet Union	1969	4	0
Soviet Union	1970	8	1
Career total		21	3

== Honours ==
- Soviet Top League winner: 1961, 1966, 1967, 1968, 1971.
- Soviet Cup winner: 1964, 1966.

== International career ==
Serebryanikov was a key player on the Soviet Olympic team during their 1964 Summer Olympics qualifications scoring 4 goals, yet the team did not qualify for the finals in Tokyo.

Serebryanikov made his debut for USSR senior squad on 11 October 1964 in a friendly against Austria (he was selected for the 1962 FIFA World Cup squad, but did not play in any games at the tournament). He played in the 1966 and 1970 World Cup tournaments.

He is statistically remembered as the first substituted player in the history of the World Cup, in 1970, the first World Cup where substitutions were allowed. He was substituted at half-time in the opening game of the tournament, between USSR and hosts Mexico, when he was replaced by Anatoliy Puzach.
