= Andriy Biba =

Ukrainian footballer and coach

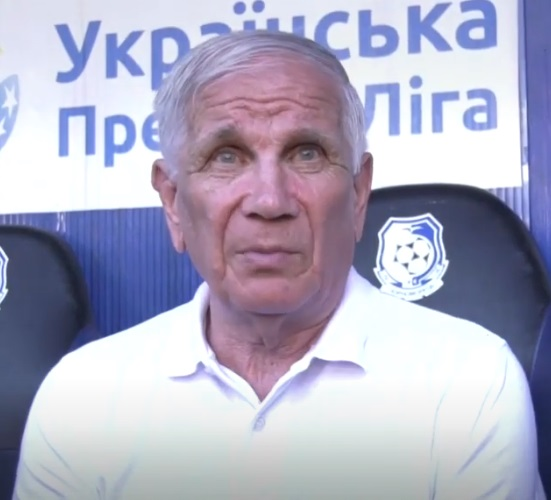

Personal information
- Full name: Andriy Andriyovych Biba
- Date of birth: 10 August 1937 (age 89)
- Place of birth: Kyiv, Ukrainian SSR
- Position: Midfielder

Youth career
- FShM Kyiv

Senior career*
Years	Team	Apps	(Gls)
1957–1967	Dynamo Kyiv	247	(69)
1968–1969	Dnipro	74	(15)
1970	Desna Chernihiv	0	(0)

International career
1965	USSR	1	(0)

Managerial career
- 1972–1973: Dynamo Kyiv (assistant)
- 1975–1976: Tavriya Simferopol (assistant)
- 1977–1978: Dnipro Dnipropetrovsk (assistant)
- 1980: Spartak Zhytomyr
- 1981: Vuhlyk Horlivka
- 1983: Podillya Khmelnytskyi
- 1986–1989: Naftovyk Okhtyrka
- 1993–1994: Naftovyk Okhtyrka
- 1994–1995: Naftovyk Okhtyrka
- 1995–1996: Khimik Zhytomyr
- 1997–: Dynamo Kyiv (scout)
- * Club domestic league appearances and goals

Andriy Andriyovych Biba (Ukrainian: Андрій Андрійович Біба; born 10 August 1937) is a Soviet and Ukrainian retired football player and coach.

== Career ==
Biba's first team was Kyiv's Iskra, coached by Volodymyr Balakin. Soon, FSHM opened in Kyiv, where Balakin went and took a number of Iskra players with him. In 1957, Oleg Oshenkov took him to Dynamo Kyiv. Soon Biba made his debut for the main team - went to the match against "Zenith" in Leningrad (2:2) and scored a goal. He played for Dynamo Kyiv (1957-1967), Dnipro (1968-1969), and Desna Chernihiv (1970). He played 246 matches in the Soviet Top League and scored 69 goals. Scored the first goal of Soviet clubs in European Cups (Cup Winners' Cup) "Coleraine" (Northern Ireland) - FC Dynamo Kyiv - 1:6. In 1967, after reaching the age of 30, he was forced to leave Dynamo Kyiv. At first, he thought he would be a coach, but soon realized that he still had the strength to play. He spent two seasons at Dnipro. In 1970 he moved to Desna Chernihiv in Football Championship of the Ukrainian SSR.

== International career ==
Biba played his only game for the USSR on 4 July 1965 in a friendly against Brazil starring Pelé. Biba appeared on the field only in the 2nd half and played 30 minutes.

== After retirement ==
From 1972, he worked in the coaching staff of Dynamo Kyiv. Among his merits is the invitation to Kyiv of Viktor Kolotov from Rubin Kazan. In different years, he worked in the coaching staff of such clubs as Tavriya Simferopol, Dnipro Dnipropetrovsk. He coached Spartak Zhytomyr, Vuhlyk Horlivka, Podillya Khmelnytskyi, Naftovyk Okhtyrka, Khimik Zhytomyr. He served as a senior coach of the Football Federation of Ukraine - 1982, 1984-1986 (June), 1990-1993, June. He was the head of the team of Dynamo Kyiv veterans. Currently coach of Dynamo Kyiv, president of the Ukrainian club "Leather Ball".

== Playmaker ==
Biba is acknowledged as one of the greatest attacking midfielders Eastern Europe has ever produced. As Guardian journalist Jonathan Wilson explains, he functioned as 'Bobby Charlton did in Alf Ramsey's England side' as an advanced attacking midfielder moving the ball around the attacking third with a howitzer shot. He enjoyed a starring role in the Dynamo Kyiv team of Victor Maslov.

== Honours ==
- Soviet Top League winner: 1961, 1966, 1967.
- Soviet Cup winner: 1964, 1966.
- Soviet Footballer of the Year: 1966.
