= Mykola Holovko =

Ukrainian footballer and manager (1937–2004)

Personal information
- Full name: Mykola Maksymovych Holovko
- Date of birth: 16 April 1937
- Place of birth: Makiivka, Ukraine, Soviet Union
- Date of death: 26 August 2004 (aged 67)
- Place of death: Donetsk, Ukraine
- Position: Defender

Senior career*
Years	Team	Apps	(Gls)
1958–1960	Lokomotyv Donetsk	70	(1)
1960–1969	Shakhtar Donetsk	224	(?)

Managerial career
- 197x–197x: Kolos Starobeshevo
- 1972: Shakhtar Makiivka (director)
- 1973: Shakhtar Makiivka
- 1974–1975: Shakhtar Donetsk (assistant)
- 197x–197x: Kolos Ilovaisk
- 1979–1982: Mali
- 1987–1988: Illichivets Mariupol (director)
- 1988–1989: Illichivets Mariupol
- 199x–?: Shakhtar Donetsk (young school)
- * Club domestic league appearances and goals

Mykola Maksymovych Holovko (Ukrainian: Микола Максимович Головко; 16 April 1937 – 26 August 2004) was a Ukrainian football (soccer) player and coach. He was born in the city of Makiivka, Ukraine. As a player, he played for Shakhtar Donetsk and Lokomotyv Donetsk. He coached Kolos Starobeshevo, Shakhtar Makiivka, Kolos Ilovaisk, Mali and Illichivets Mariupol. Later worked as a coach in young school of Shakhtar Donetsk. Honorary coach of Ukraine in 1996.

== Awards ==
- Winner of Soviet Cup: 1961, 1962
- Finalist of Soviet Cup: 1963
