= Yuriy Voynov =

Soviet Russian and Ukrainian footballer

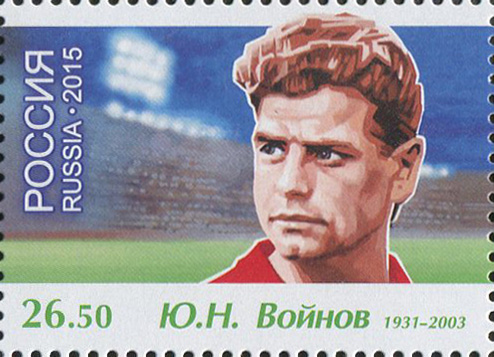
- Voynov on a 2016 Russian stamp from the series "Football Legends"

Personal information
- Full name: Yuriy Mykolayovych Voynov
- Date of birth: 29 November 1931
- Place of birth: Kalininsky, Moscow Oblast, USSR
- Date of death: 22 April 2003 (aged 71)
- Place of death: Kyiv, Ukraine
- Height: 1.74 m (5 ft 9 in)
- Position: Midfielder

Senior career*
Years	Team	Apps	(Gls)
1949–1950	Kalinin Plant		
1951–1955	Zenit	98	(5)
1956–1964	Dynamo Kyiv	176	(22)

International career
1954–1960	USSR	23	(2)
1956	Ukraine	4	(4)

Managerial career
- 1963: Dynamo Kyiv (assistant)
- 1964–1967: Chornomorets Odesa
- 1967–1969: Sudnobudivnyk Mykolaiv
- 1969–1970: Shakhtar Donetsk
- 1970: Chornomorets Odesa
- 1970–1972: Budivelnyk Poltava
- 1972–1973: Metalist Kharkiv
- 1976–1977: SKA Kyiv/SC Chernihiv
- 1978–1979: Sudnobudivnyk Mykolaiv
- 1992: Temp Shepetivka
Medal record
Representing Soviet Union
UEFA European Championship
Winner	1960 France
- * Club domestic league appearances and goals

Yuriy Nikolayevich Voynov (Russian: Юрий Николаевич Войнов; 29 November 1931 – 22 April 2003) was a Soviet football player and manager, who played as a midfielder.

== Playing career ==
=== International career ===
He earned 23 caps for the USSR national football team, and represented the country in the 1958 FIFA World Cup and the 1960 European Nations' Cup, where the USSR were crowned the first ever European champions. Also, he was listed as one of the best XI after the 1958 World Cup by Dr. Friedebert Becker.

In 1956 Voinov played couple of games for Ukraine at the Spartakiad of the Peoples of the USSR.

== Honours ==
=== Player ===
==== Club ====
Dynamo Kyiv

- Soviet Top League Winner: 1961

==== International ====
USSR

- European Nations' Cup Winner: 1960

==== Individudal ====
- Selected to the FIFA World Cup team of the tournament: 1958
- Ballon d'Or 12th: 1959
- ADN Eastern European Footballer of the Season: 1960
