= Football records and statistics in Ukraine =

== Ukrainian Premier League ==
As of the end of the 2020–21 season, unless stated otherwise.

=== Team records ===
==== Titles ====
- Most League titles:
  - 16, Dynamo Kyiv
- Most consecutive League titles:
  - 9, Dynamo Kyiv (1992–93 – 2000–01)
- Biggest title-winning margin:
  - 23 points, 2019–20; Shakhtar Donetsk (82 points) over Dynamo Kyiv (59 points).
- Smallest title-winning margin:
  - 0 points:
    - 1992–93, Dynamo Kyiv and Dnipro Dnipropetrovsk both finished on 44 points, but Dynamo Kyiv won the title with a superior goal difference: (+45) over (+31);
    - 2005–06, Shakhtar Donetsk and Dynamo Kyiv both finished on 75 points, but Shakhtar won the title by winning the golden match.
- Winning a title with most remaining games:
  - 5 games, Shakhtar Donetsk (2019–20)

==== Wins ====
- Most wins in a season: 27, Dynamo Kyiv (1999–2000)
  - 26 games: 23, Dynamo Kyiv (2015–16)
  - 28 games: 21, Shakhtar Donetsk (2013–14)
  - 30 games: 27, Dynamo Kyiv (1999–2000)
  - 32 games: 26, Shakhtar Donetsk (2019–20)
  - 34 games: 25, Dynamo Kyiv (1994–95)
- Fewest wins in a season: 0, Zirka Kirovohrad (1999–2000)
  - 26 games: 2, Nyva Ternopil (2000–01)
  - 28 games: 2, Metalurh Zaporizhzhia and Tavriya Simferopol (2013–14)
  - 30 games: 0, Zirka Kirovohrad (1999–2000)
  - 32 games: 2, Karpaty Lviv (2019–20)
  - 34 games: 4, Zorya Luhansk (1995–96)

==== Losses ====
- Most losses in a season: 26, Zorya Luhansk (1995–96)
  - 26 games: 21, Nyva Ternopil (2000–01)
  - 28 games: 22, Tavriya Simferopol (2013–14)
  - 30 games: 22, SC Mykolaiv (1998–99)
  - 32 games: 24, Volyn Lutsk (2016–17)
  - 34 games: 26, Zorya Luhansk (1995–96)
- Fewest losses in a season: 0, Dynamo Kyiv (1999–2000, 2006–07, 2014–15), Shakhtar Donetsk (2001–02)
  - 26 games: 0, Shakhtar Donetsk (2001–02), Dynamo Kyiv (2014–15)
  - 28 games: 3, Metalist Kharkiv (2013–14)
  - 30 games: 0, Dynamo Kyiv (1999–2000, 2006–07)
  - 32 games: 2, Shakhtar Donetsk (2016–17, 2019–20)
  - 34 games: 1, Dynamo Kyiv (1993–94, 1994–95)

==== Points ====
- Most points in a season: 84, Dynamo Kyiv (1999–2000)
  - 26 games: 70, Dynamo Kyiv (2015–16)
  - 28 games: 65, Shakhtar Donetsk (2013–14)
  - 30 games: 84, Dynamo Kyiv (1999–2000)
  - 32 games: 82, Shakhtar Donetsk (2019–20)
  - 34 games: 83, Dynamo Kyiv (1994–95)
- Fewest points in a season: 9, Zirka Kirovohrad (1999–2000), Nyva Ternopil (2000–01)
  - 26 games: 9, Nyva Ternopil (2000–01)
  - 28 games: 10, Tavriya Simferopol (2013–14)
  - 30 games: 9, Zirka Kirovohrad (1999–2000)
  - 32 games: 10, Volyn Lutsk (2016–17)
  - 34 games: 16, Zorya Luhansk (1995–96)

==== Goals scored ====
- Most goals scored in a season: 87, Dynamo Kyiv (1994–95)
  - 26 games: 76, Shakhtar Donetsk (2015–16)
  - 28 games: 65, Shakhtar Donetsk (2013–14)
  - 30 games: 85, Dynamo Kyiv (1999–2000)
  - 32 games: 80, Shakhtar Donetsk (2019–20)
  - 34 games: 87, Dynamo Kyiv (1994–95)
- Fewest goals scored in a season: 13, Hoverla Uzhhorod (2015–16)
  - 26 games: 13, Hoverla Uzhhorod (2015–16)
  - 28 games: 15, Tavriya Simferopol (2013–14)
  - 30 games: 15, Borysfen Boryspil (2004–05)
  - 32 games: 17, Volyn Lutsk (2016–17)
  - 34 games: 16, Zorya Luhansk (1995–96)

==== Goals conceded ====
- Most goals conceded in a season: 80, Zorya-MALS Luhansk (1995–96)
  - 26 games: 65, Nyva Ternopil (2000–01)
  - 28 games: 54, Metalurh Zaporizhzhia (2013–14)
  - 30 games: 69, Torpedo Zaporizhzhia (1997–98)
  - 32 games: 59, Kolos Kovalivka (2019–20)
  - 34 games: 80, Zorya-MALS Luhansk (1995–96)
- Fewest goals conceded in a season: 9, Dynamo Kyiv (2001–02)
  - 26 games: 9, Dynamo Kyiv (2001–02)
  - 28 games: 22, Chornomorets Odesa (2013–14)
  - 30 games: 12, Dynamo Kyiv (2011–12)
  - 32 games: 11, Shakhtar Donetsk (2018-19)
  - 34 games: 17, Dynamo Kyiv (1995–96)

==== Appearances ====
- Most top flight appearances overall: 30 (all seasons since the formation of league in 1992), joint record:
  - Dynamo Kyiv
  - Shakhtar Donetsk
- Fewest top flight appearances overall: 1, joint record:
  - Odesa (1992)
  - Mynai (2020–21)

==== Participation ====
- Most participants from one region: During the season 2014–15, Donetsk oblast had 4 participants: Shakhtar Donetsk, Olimpik Donetsk, Metalurh Donetsk and Illichivets Mariupol

==== Scorelines ====
- Biggest home win: 9:0, Dynamo Kyiv v. Illichivets (31 October 2010)
- Biggest away win: 0:7, Nyva Ternopil v. Shakhtar Donetsk (15 June 2001), Kryvbas Kryvyi Rih v. Dynamo Kyiv (22 September 2001), Obolon Kyiv v. Dynamo Kyiv (11 November 2004)

=== Individual Records ===
- Champion with clubs: Oleksandr Holovko (Tavriya Simferopol and Dynamo Kyiv), Oleksandr Rybka (Dynamo Kyiv and Shakhtar Donetsk), Júnior Moraes (Dynamo Kyiv and Shakhtar Donetsk)
- First Premier League goal: Anatoliy Mushchinka (for Karpaty Lviv–Chornomorets Odesa, 6 March 1992)
- First hat-trick: Ivan Hetsko (for Chornomorets Odesa–Nyva Vn., 4 April 1992)
- Most goals in a game: 4, joint record:
  - Yuri Hudymenko for SC Tavriya Simferopol (Tavriya Simferopol–Temp Shepetivka (6–0), 9 June 1992)
  - Serhii Rebrov for Dynamo Kyiv (Dynamo Kyiv–Kryvbas Kryvyi Rih (5–0), 13 October 1996)
  - Oleh Matviiv for Shakhtar Donetsk (Shakhtar Donetsk–Torpedo Zaporizhzhia (9–1), 16 May 1997)
  - Oleksandr Haidash for SC Tavriya Simferopol (SC Tavriya Simferopol–FC Torpedo Zaporizhzhia (5–0), 7 September 1997)
  - Ivan Hetsko for Karpaty Lviv (Karpaty Lviv–Dnipro Dnipropetrovsk (4–0), 29 August 1999)
  - Ivan Hetsko for Kryvbas Kryvyi Rih (Kryvbas Kryvyi Rih–Nyva Ternopil (5–1), 14 May 2000)
  - Georgi Demetradze for Dynamo Kyiv (Nyva Ternopil–Dynamo Kyiv (3–7), 27 August 2000)
  - Brandão for Shakhtar Donetsk (FC Metalist Kharkiv–Shakhtar Donetsk (1–5), 20 August 2005)
  - Artem Milevskyi for Dynamo Kyiv (Dynamo Kyiv–Illichivets Mariupol (9–0), 31 October 2010)
  - Matheus for FC Dnipro Dnipropetrovsk (Dnipro Dnipropetrovsk–FC Volyn Lutsk (5–1), 15 April 2014)
  - Yevhen Seleznyov for FC Dnipro Dnipropetrovsk (Stal Dniprodzerzhynsk–Dnipro Dnipropetrovsk) (0–6), 17 October 2015)
  - Stanislav Kulish for FC Oleksandriya (Oleksandriya-Volyn Lutsk) (6–0), 25 February 2017)
- Most expensive incoming transfer fee paid:
  - €25,000,000, Bernard, in 2013, from Atlético Mineiro to Shakhtar Donetsk
  - €20,000,000, Nery Castillo, in 2007, from Olympiacos to Shakhtar Donetsk
  - €18,000,000, Pedrinho, in 2021, from Benfica to Shakhtar Donetsk
  - €15,000,000, Dmytro Chyhrynskyi, in 2010, from Barcelona to Shakhtar Donetsk
  - €15,000,000, Fred, in 2013, from Internacional to Shakhtar Donetsk
  - €15,000,000, Taison, in 2013, from Metalist Kharkiv to Shakhtar Donetsk
  - €15,000,000, Tetê, in 2019, from Grêmio to Shakhtar Donetsk
  - €14,000,000, Matuzalém, in 2004, from Brescia Calcio to Shakhtar Donetsk
  - €14,000,000, Willian, in 2007, from Corinthians to Shakhtar Donetsk
- Most expensive outgoing transfer fee paid:
  - €70,000,000, Mykhailo Mudryk, in 2023, from Shakhtar Donetsk to Chelsea F.C.
  - €60,000,000, Fred, in 2018, from Shakhtar Donetsk to Manchester United
  - €50,000,000, Alex Teixeira, in 2016, from Shakhtar Donetsk to Jiangsu Suning
  - €40,000,000, Fernandinho, in 2013, from Shakhtar Donetsk to Manchester City
  - €34,500,000, Willian, in 2013, from Shakhtar Donetsk to Anzhi Makhachkala
  - €30,000,000, Douglas Costa, in 2015, from Shakhtar Donetsk to FC Bayern Munich
  - €27,900,000, Henrikh Mkhitaryan, in 2013, from Shakhtar Donetsk to Borussia Dortmund
  - €25,000,000, Dmytro Chyhrynskyi, in 2009, from Shakhtar Donetsk to FC Barcelona
  - €25,000,000, Andriy Yarmolenko, in 2017, from Dynamo Kyiv to Borussia Dortmund
  - €24,000,000, Andriy Shevchenko, in 1999, from Dynamo Kyiv to A.C. Milan

==== All-time Vyscha Liha scorers ====
Rank	Player	Goals	Games	Ratio
1	(Uzbekistan) Maksim Shatskikh	124	341	0.364
2	(Ukraine) Serhii Rebrov	123	261	0.471
3	(Ukraine) **Yevhen Seleznyov**	117	256	0.457
4	(Ukraine) Andriy Vorobey	105	315	0.333
5	(Ukraine) (Brazil) Júnior Moraes	103	189	0.545
6	(Ukraine) Andriy Yarmolenko	99	228	0.434
7	(Ukraine) **Oleksandr Gladkyy**	98	338	0.29
8	(Ukraine) Oleksandr Haydash	95	258	0.368
9	(Ukraine) (Serbia) Marko Dević	90	219	0.411
9	(Ukraine) Serhiy Mizin	90	342	0.263
11	(Ukraine) Tymerlan Huseynov	85	215	0.395
12	(Ukraine) Oleksandr Kosyrin	84	240	0.35
13	(Ukraine) Andriy Shevchenko	83	172	0.483
14	(Ukraine) Oleh Matveyev	81	210	0.39
Players **in bold** are still playing in Premier League; Data as of 14 December 2021

==== All-time Vyscha Liha foreign scorers ====
Rank	Player	Goals	Games	Ratio
1	(Uzbekistan) Maksim Shatskikh	124	341	0.364
2	(Ukraine) (Brazil) Júnior Moraes	103	189	0.545
3	(Ukraine) (Serbia) Marko Dević	90	219	0.411
4	(Brazil) Luiz Adriano	77	162	0.475
5	(Ukraine) (Brazil) Marlos	68	232	0.293
6	(Brazil) Alex Teixeira	67	146	0.459
7	(Brazil) Brandão	65	140	0.464
8	(Georgia (country)) Vasil Gigiadze	61	245	0.249
9	(Georgia (country)) Avtandil Kapanadze	57	189	0.302
10	(Nigeria) Lucky Idahor	54	221	0.244
10	(Turkmenistan) (Ukraine) Roman Bondarenko	54	231	0.234
12	(Georgia (country)) Giorgi Demetradze	52	130	0.4
13	(Belarus) Valyantsin Byalkevich	51	224	0.228
14	(Armenia) Henrikh Mkhitaryan	50	109	0.459
14	(Brazil) Taison	50	239	0.209
Players **in bold** are still playing in Premier League; Data as of 20 August 2022

==== Active Vyscha Liha scorers ====
Rank	Player	Team	Goals	Games	Ratio
1	(Ukraine) Yevhen Seleznyov	Mynai	117	256	0.457
2	(Ukraine) Oleksandr Gladkyy	Chornomorets Odesa	98	338	0.29
3	(Ukraine) Viktor Tsyhankov	Dynamo Kyiv	71	143	0.497
4	(Ukraine) Artem Hromov	SC Dnipro-1	48	244	0.197
5	(Ukraine) Vladyslav Kulach	Dynamo Kyiv	40	145	0.276
6	(Ukraine) Vitaliy Buyalskyi	Dynamo Kyiv	38	182	0.209
7	(Ukraine) Denys Oliynyk	Vorskla Poltava	37	138	0.268
8	(Ukraine) Andriy Totovytskyi	Shakhtar Donetsk	34	129	0.264
9	(Ukraine) Denys Harmash	Dynamo Kyiv	33	213	0.155
=	(Ukraine) Volodymyr Lysenko	Kolos Kovalivka	33	213	0.155
11	(Ukraine) Artem Besyedin	Dynamo Kyiv	31	102	0.304
12	(Ukraine) Oleksandr Karavayev	Dynamo Kyiv	29	216	0.134
13	(Ukraine) Artem Dovbyk	SC Dnipro-1	25	63	0.397
=	(Ukraine) Serhiy Kravchenko	Chornomorets Odesa	25	279	0.09
15	(Ukraine) Yuriy Kolomoyets	Mynai	24	101	0.238
16	(Ukraine) Vyacheslav Churko	Zorya Luhansk	23	155	0.148
=	(Ukraine) Dmytro Khomchenovskyi	Kryvbas Kryvyi	23	194	0.119
Data as of 20 August 2022

==== All-time Vyscha Liha appearance leaders ====
**Rank**	**Player**	**Games**
1	(Ukraine) Oleksandr Shovkovskyi	426
2	(Ukraine) Oleh Shelayev	412
3	(Ukraine) Vyacheslav Checher	409
4	(Ukraine) Oleksandr Chyzhevskyi	400
5	(Ukraine) Oleksandr Horyainov	391
6	(Ukraine) Ruslan Rotan	375
7	(Ukraine) Serhiy Nazarenko	373
8	(Ukraine) Serhiy Shyshchenko	363
9	(Ukraine) Ruslan Kostyshyn	359
10	(Ukraine) Serhiy Zakarlyuka	356
Data as of 20 August 2022.

==== All-time Vyscha Liha foreign appearance leaders ====
**Rank**	**Player**	**Games**
1	(Uzbekistan) Maksim Shatskikh	341
2	(Croatia) Darijo Srna	339
3	(Ukraine) (Brazil) Edmar	316
4	(Serbia) Željko Ljubenović	303
5	(Senegal) Papa Gueye	298
6	(Albania) Armend Dallku	292
7	(Croatia) Mladen Bartulović	252
8	(Georgia (country)) Vasil Gigiadze	245
9	(Brazil) Taison	239
10	(Ukraine) (Brazil) Marlos	232
Data as of 20 August 2022.

==== Active Vyscha Liha appearance ====
Rank	Player	Team	Games
1	(Ukraine) Andriy Pyatov	Shakhtar Donetsk	342
2	(Ukraine) Oleksandr Gladkyy	Chornomorets Odesa	337
3	(Ukraine) Volodymyr Chesnakov	Vorskla Poltava	333
4	(Ukraine) Taras Stepanenko	Shakhtar Donetsk	315
5	(Ukraine) Serhiy Kravchenko	Chornomorets Odesa	279
6	(Ukraine) Yevhen Seleznyov	Mynai	256
7	(Ukraine) Valeriy Fedorchuk	Rukh Lviv	252
8	(Ukraine) Vitaliy Vernydub	Kryvbas Kryvyi Rih	246
9	(Ukraine) Artem Hromov	SC Dnipro-1	244
10	(Ukraine) Serhiy Politylo	Chornomorets Odesa	241
11	(Ukraine) Yuriy Pankiv	Rukh Lviv	240
12	(Ukraine) Serhiy Yavorskyi	Vorskla Poltava	228
13	(Ukraine) Mykola Morozyuk	Chornomorets Odesa	227
14	(Ukraine) Andriy Bohdanov	Kolos Kovalivka	226
15	(Ukraine) Serhiy Sydorchuk	Dynamo Kyiv	220
16	(Ukraine) Ihor Perduta	Vorskla Poltava	217
17	(Ukraine) Oleksandr Karavayev	Dynamo Kyiv	216
18	(Ukraine) Denys Harmash	Dynamo Kyiv	213
=	(Ukraine) Volodymyr Lysenko	Kolos Kovalivka	213
20	(Ukraine) Denys Miroshnichenko	Oleksandriya	203
Data as of 20 August 2022.

==== Goalscoring categories ====
Most prolific all-time Vyscha Liha scorers:

Rank	Player	Games	Goals	Goals/Game
1	(Ukraine) Ivan Hetsko	113	67	0.593
2	(Ukraine) Viktor Leonenko	118	67	0.568
3	(Ukraine) (Brazil) Júnior Moraes	189	103	0.545
4	(Ukraine) **Viktor Tsyhankov**	143	71	0.497
5	(Ukraine) Andriy Shevchenko	172	83	0.483
6	(Brazil) Luiz Adriano	162	77	0.475
7	(Ukraine) Serhii Rebrov	261	123	0.471
8	(Brazil) Brandão	139	65	0.468
9	(Ukraine) **Yevhen Seleznyov**	256	117	0.457
10	(Brazil) Alex Teixeira	146	67	0.459
11	(Ukraine) Andriy Yarmolenko	228	99	0.434
12	(Ukraine) (Serbia) Marko Dević	219	90	0.411
13	(Ukraine) Timerlan Huseinov	215	85	0.395
Minimum of 60 goals needed to qualify.			Data as of 20 August 2022.	

Single season Vyscha Liha topscorers:

Rank	Player	Year	Team	Games	Goals	Goals/Game
1	Henrikh Mkhitaryan	2012–13	Shakhtar Donetsk	28	25	0.893
2	Alex Teixeira	2015–16	Shakhtar Donetsk	15	22	1.467
=	Serhii Rebrov	1997–98	Dynamo Kyiv	29	22	0.759
=	Maksim Shatskikh	2002–03	Dynamo Kyiv	29	22	0.759
5	Andriy Vorobei	2000–01	Shakhtar Donetsk	24	21	0.875
=	Oleh Matviiv	1996–97	Shakhtar Donetsk	25	21	0.84
=	Oleksiy Byelik	2002–03	Shakhtar Donetsk	28	21	0.75
=	Facundo Ferreyra	2017–18	Shakhtar Donetsk	30	21	0.7
=	Arsen Avakov	1994–95	Torpedo Zaporizhzhia	33	21	0.636
10	Maksim Shatskikh	1999–2000	Dynamo Kyiv	25	20	0.8
=	Luiz Adriano	2013–14	Shakhtar Donetsk	25	20	0.8
=	Júnior Moraes	2019–20	Shakhtar Donetsk	27	20	0.741
=	Serhii Rebrov	1996–97	Dynamo Kyiv	30	20	0.667
=	Timerlan Huseinov	1995–96	Chornomorets Odesa	33	20	0.606
15	Andriy Shevchenko	1997–98	Dynamo Kyiv	23	19	0.826
=	Ivan Hetsko	1999–2000	Kryvbas Kryvyi Rih / Karpaty Lviv	23	19	0.826
=	Oleh Venglinsky	2002–03	Dnipro Dnipropetrovsk	23	19	0.826
=	Marko Dević	2007–08	Metalist Kharkiv	27	19	0.704
=	Júnior Moraes	2013–14	Metalurh Donetsk	27	19	0.704
=	Júnior Moraes	2018–19	Shakhtar Donetsk	27	19	0.704
Data as of 12 May 2021.

==== Goalkeeping categories ====
Best all-time Vyscha Liha goalkeeper:

	Player	Games	Goals Allowed/Game	Goals Allowed
1	Oleksandr Shovkovskyi	334	0.63	210
2	Andriy Pyatov	117	0.70	82
3	Oleh Suslov	150	0.79	119
4	Dmytro Shutkov	266	0.83	222
5	Mykola Medin	205	0.85	174
6	Yuri Virt	182	0.86	157
7	Vyacheslav Kernozenko	190	0.89	169
8	Vitaliy Reva	270	0.91	246
9	Ilya Blyznyuk	136	0.93	126
10	Volodymyr Tsytkin	104	0.93	97
Minimum of 75 appearances needed to qualify. Data through 2009–10 season.

Most all-time Vyscha Liha goals allowed:

	Player	Games	Goals Allowed	Goals Allowed/Game
1	Ihor Shukhovtsev	292	396	1.36
2	Oleksandr Horyainov	304	340	1.12
3	Andriy Hlushchenko	225	323	1.44
4	Andriy Nikitin	244	313	1.28
5	Serhiy Dolhansky	241	277	1.15
6	Vitaliy Reva	270	246	0.91
7	Dmytro Shutkov	266	222	0.84
8	Volodymyr Marchuk	141	209	1.48
9	Andriy Kovtun	184	203	1.10
10	Bohdan Strontsitsky	198	202	1.02
Data through 2008–09 season.

Best single season Vyscha Liha goalkeeper:

	Player	Year	Team	Games	Goals Allowed/Game	Goals Allowed
1	Oleksandr Shovkovskyi	2004–05	Dynamo Kyiv	23	0.39	9
2	Oleksandr Shovkovskyi	2011–12	Dynamo Kyiv	24	0.42	10
3	Andriy Pyatov	2008–09	Shakhtar Donetsk	24	0.46	11
4	Stanislav Bohush	2008–09	Dynamo Kyiv	21	0.48	10
5	Yuri Virt	1999-00	Shakhtar Donetsk	30	0.50	15
=	Oleksandr Shovkovskyi	1997–98	Dynamo Kyiv	26	0.50	13
7	Andriy Pyatov	2010–11	Shakhtar Donetsk	29	0.52	15
=	Andriy Pyatov	2009–10	Shakhtar Donetsk	27	0.52	14
=	Oleksandr Shovkovskyi	1995–96	Dynamo Kyiv	25	0.52	13
10	Oleksandr Shovkovskyi	2009–10	Dynamo Kyiv	24	0.54	13
11	Oleksandr Shovkovskyi	1996–97	Dynamo Kyiv	24	0.58	14
=	Oleksandr Shovkovskyi	1998–99	Dynamo Kyiv	24	0.58	14
13	Ilya Blyzniuk	1996–97	Dnipro Dnipropetrovsk	29	0.59	17
Minimum of 20 appearances needed to qualify. Data through 2011–12 season.

== Ukrainian Cup ==
As of the end of the 2020–21 season, unless stated otherwise.

- Highest attendance: 81,000 – Shakhtar Donetsk 3–2 (a.e.t.) Dynamo Kyiv at NSC Olimpiyskiy, 2002 Ukrainian Cup Final (26 May 2002)

=== Final ===
==== Team records ====
- Most wins: 13, joint record:
  - Shakhtar Donetsk (1995, 1997, 2001, 2002, 2004, 2008, 2011, 2012, 2013, 2016, 2017, 2018, 2019)
  - Dynamo Kyiv (1993, 1996, 1998, 1999, 2000, 2003, 2005, 2006, 2007, 2014, 2015, 2020, 2021)
- Most consecutive wins: 4, Shakhtar Donetsk (2016–2019)
- Most appearances in finals: 19, Shakhtar Donetsk (1995, 1997, 2001, 2002, 2003, 2004, 2005, 2007, 2008, 2009, 2011, 2012, 2013, 2014, 2015, 2016, 2017, 2018, 2019)
- Longest consecutive appearances in finals: 9, Shakhtar Donetsk (2011–2019)
- Most Final appearances without win: 3, Dnipro (1995, 1997, 2004)
- Longest winning streak in finals: 5, Dynamo Kyiv (1993, 1996, 1998, 1999, 2000)
- Most defeats in finals: 6, Shakhtar Donetsk (2003, 2005, 2007, 2009, 2014, 2015)
- Biggest win: 4 goals, Shakhtar Donetsk 4–0 Inhulets Petrove (2019)
- Most goals in a final: 5, joint record:
  - Shakhtar Donetsk 3–2 (a.e.t.) Dynamo Kyiv (2002)
  - Tavriya Simferopol 3–2 (a.e.t.) Metalurh Donetsk (2010)
- Most red cards in a final: 5, Shakhtar Donetsk 2–0 Dynamo Kyiv (2008)
- Least yellow/red cards in a final: 0 (no cards shown), Chornomorets Odesa 0–0 (5–3 p) Tavriya Simferopol (1994)

==== Individual records ====
- Most wins: 10, Oleksandr Shovkovskyi (Dynamo Kyiv) (1996, 1998, 1999, 2000, 2003, 2005, 2006, 2007, 2014, 2015)
- Fastest goal: 1st minute, Andriy Shevchenko, Dynamo Kyiv 2–1 CSKA Kyiv, 1998
- Latest goal: 120th minute, Serhiy Atelkin, Shakhtar Donetsk 2–1 (a.e.t.) CSKA Kyiv, 2001
- Most goals in finals: 4, Andriy Shevchenko (Dynamo Kyiv), Serhiy Atelkin (Shakhtar Donetsk)

==== Managerial records ====
- Most wins: 7, Mircea Lucescu (Shakhtar Donetsk, 2004, 2008, 2011, 2012, 2013, 2016; Dynamo Kyiv, 2021)

==== Host of the finals ====
NSC Olimpiyskiy in Kyiv has hosted the most Ukrainian Cup Finals with 18, including all 16 finals up to 2006–07 season, and 2 Finals after. Starting from the 2007–08 season the final is held at different stadiums, the other stadiums which hosted multiple games are OSC Metalist in Kharkiv (5), Dnipro-Arena (2) and Arena Lviv (2). Yuvileiny Stadium in Sumy, Oleksiy Butovsky Vorskla Stadium in Poltava, Slavutych Arena in Zaporizhzhia and City Stadium in Ternopil hosted the final once.

=== Teams by semi-final appearances ===
Team	No.	Years
Shakhtar Donetsk	23	1992, 1995, 1996, 1997, 1999, 2001, 2002, 2003, 2004, 2005, 2007, 2008, 2009, 2010, 2011, 2012, 2013, 2014, 2015, 2016, 2017, 2018, 2019
Dynamo Kyiv	20	1993, 1996, 1998, 1999, 2000, 2002, 2003, 2004, 2005, 2006, 2007, 2008, 2009, 2011, 2014, 2015, 2017, 2018, 2020, 2021
Dnipro	12	1995, 1997, 2001, 2002, 2003, 2004, 2005, 2011, 2013, 2015, 2016, 2017
Chornomorets Odesa	7	1992, 1994, 1995, 2004, 2008, 2013, 2014
Karpaty Lviv	5	1993, 1994, 1999, 2006, 2012
Metalurh Donetsk	5	1998, 2002, 2008, 2010, 2012
Metalist Kharkiv	4	1992, 1993, 2007, 2009
Tavriya Simferopol	4	1994, 1995, 2007, 2010
Arsenal Kyiv	4	1997, 1998, 2001, 2011
Mariupol	4	2001, 2006, 2018, 2020
Kryvbas Kryvyi Rih	3	1998, 2000, 2005
Metalurh Zaporizhzhia	3	1997, 2000, 2006
Volyn Lutsk	3	2003, 2010, 2012
Zorya Luhansk	3	2016, 2019, 2021
Torpedo Zaporizhzhia	2	1992, 1993
Zirka Kropyvnytskyi	2	1999, 2000
Dnipro-1	2	2018, 2019
Vorskla Poltava	2	2009, 2020
Oleksandriya	2	2016, 2021
Veres Rivne	1	1994
Nyva Vinnytsia	1	1996
Kremin Kremenchuk	1	1996
Sevastopol	1	2013
Cherkashchyna	1	2014
Olimpik Donetsk	1	2015
Mykolaiv	1	2017
Inhulets Petrove	1	2019
Mynai	1	2020
Ahrobiznes Volochysk	1	2021

=== Overall ===
- Most Ukrainian Cup games played: 157, Shakhtar Donetsk
- Most Ukrainian Cup games won: 118, Dynamo Kyiv
- Most Ukrainian Cup games lost: 39, Chornomorets Odesa
- Most Ukrainian Cup games drawn: 22, Shakhtar Donetsk
- Most Ukrainian Cup goals scored: 359, Dynamo Kyiv
- Most Ukrainian Cup goals conceded: 135, Volyn Lutsk
- Highest Ukrainian Cup goal difference: +265, Dynamo Kyiv

==== All-time Ukrainian Cup top scorers ====
Rank	Player	Club(s)	Goals	Games	Ratio
1	(Ukraine) Andriy Vorobei	Shakhtar-2 Donetsk, Shakhtar Donetsk, Dnipro, Arsenal Kyiv, Metalist Kharkiv	25	54	0.463
2	(Uzbekistan) Maksim Shatskikh	Dynamo Kyiv, Arsenal Kyiv, Chornomorets Odesa, Hoverla Uzhhorod	24	50	0.48
3	(Ukraine) Oleksandr Palyanytsia	Dnipro, Veres Rivne, Karpaty Lviv, Kryvbas Kryvyi Rih, Metalist Kharkiv	22	48	0.458
4	(Ukraine) Andriy Shevchenko	Dynamo-2 Kyiv, Dynamo Kyiv	21	31	0.677
5	(Ukraine) Serhii Rebrov	Shakhtar Donetsk, Dynamo Kyiv	20	51	0.392
5	(Ukraine) Andriy Yarmolenko	Dynamo Kyiv	20	27	0.741
7	(Ukraine) Andriy Pokladok	Skala Stryi, Karpaty Lviv, Metalurh Donetsk, Oleksandriya, Rava, Halychyna Lviv	19	47	0.404
8	(Brazil) Luiz Adriano	Shakhtar Donetsk	18	34	0.529
9	(Ukraine) Oleh Matveyev	Shakhtar Donetsk, Kremin Kremenchuk, Metalurh Zaporizhzhia, Metalurh Donetsk	17	32	0.531
10	(Ukraine) Oleksiy Antyukhin	Metalurh Zaporizhzhia, Tavriya Simferopol, Vorskla Poltava	16	34	0.471
10	(Ukraine) Oleh Husyev	Frunzenets-Liha-99 Sumy, Arsenal Kyiv, Dynamo Kyiv	16	51	0.314
Data through 8 July 2020.

== Ukrainian Super Cup ==
As of the end of the 2021 edition, unless stated otherwise.

=== Team records ===
- Most wins: 9, joined record: Dynamo Kyiv, Shakhtar Donetsk
- Most consecutive wins: 4, Shakhtar Donetsk (2012–2015)
- Most appearances: 17, Shakhtar Donetsk
- Longest consecutive appearances: 12, Shakhtar Donetsk (2010–2021)
- Most goals: 8, Shakhtar Donetsk 7–1 Tavriya Simferopol (2010)

== Most successful clubs overall ==
=== Key ===
Ukrainian domestic competitions organised by the UAF
L	Ukrainian Premier League, former Vyshcha Liha (1992–2008)
CUP	Ukrainian Cup
SCUP	Ukrainian Super Cup
Soviet domestic competitions organised by the FFSU (all defunct)
STL	Soviet Top League, former Group A (1936–1941), First Group (1945–1949), Class "A" (1950–1962), First Group "A" (1963–1969)
SC	Soviet Cup
SFC	USSR Federation Cup
SSC	Soviet Super Cup, former Season's Cup (1977–1985)
European continental competitions organised by UEFA
UCL	UEFA Champions League, former European Champions Cup
CWC	UEFA Cup Winners' Cup (defunct)
UEL	UEFA Europa League, former UEFA Cup
USC	UEFA Super Cup

=== Performance by club ===
Record competitions winners shown in bold.

As of 24 May 2026

Team	Ukrainian Domestic			USSR Domestic					European			Total	Last trophy
Team	L	CUP	SCUP	STL	SC	SFC	SSC	CIS	CWC	UEL	USC	Total	Last trophy
Dynamo Kyiv	**17**	14	**9**	**13**	**9**	-	**3**	**4**	**2**	-	**1**	**72**	2025–26 Ukrainian Cup
Shakhtar Donetsk	16	**15**	**9**	-	4	-	1	-	-	**1**	-	46	2025–26 Ukrainian Premier League
Dnipro	-	-	-	2	1	**2**	1	-	-	-	-	6	1989 USSR Federation Cup
Chornomorets Odesa	-	2	-	-	-	1	-	-	-	-	-	3	1993–94 Ukrainian Cup
Tavriya Simferopol	1	1	-	-	-	-	-	-	-	-	-	2	2009–10 Ukrainian Cup
Zorya Luhansk	-	-	-	1	-	-	-	-	-	-	-	1	1972 Soviet Top League
Vorskla Poltava	-	1	-	-	-	-	-	-	-	-	-	1	2008–09 Ukrainian Cup
Karpaty Lviv	-	-	-	-	1	-	-	-	-	-	-	1	1969 Soviet Cup
Metalist Kharkiv	-	-	-	-	1	-	-	-	-	-	-	1	1987–88 Soviet Cup

== See also ==
- List of football clubs by competitive honours won
