= Oleksandr Chizhevskiy club =

Ukrainian football career match leaders

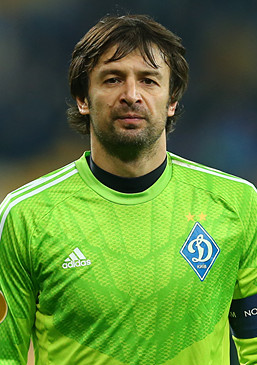
Oleksandr Shovkovskyi is the all-time appearance leader in Ukrainian Premier League.

Oleksandr Chizhevskiy Club (Ukrainian:Клуб Олександра Чижевського) is a non-official name list of the football players who during their career in the Ukrainian Premier League had more than 300 official match appearances. This club was named in honor of Oleksandr Chizhevskiy, who first achieved this goal.

The all-time appearance leader with 426 matches is Oleksandr Shovkovskyi, who also holds a record for the most appearances playing for a single club – Dynamo Kyiv. Among the players active in the league now, Andriy Pyatov is the highest-ranked player with 330 league games. Overall, 31 players managed to play in at least 300 matches in the competition.

== Oleksandr Chizhevskiy Club ==
- **Bold** shows players still playing in the Ukrainian Premier League.
- Italics show players still playing professional football in other leagues

As of 15 July 2020

R	Player	Matches	Teams
1	(Ukraine) Oleksandr Shovkovskyi	426	Dynamo Kyiv – 426 (1994–2016)
2	(Ukraine) Oleh Shelayev	412	Zorya Luhansk – 68 (1994–1995), Shakhtar Donetsk – 36 (1997–1998, 2000), Metalurh Donetsk – 13 (2000), Dnipro – 209 (2001–2007, 2009), Kryvbas Kryvyi Rih – 8 (2009), Metalist Kharkiv – 78 (2009–2014)
3	(Ukraine) Vyacheslav Checher	409	Kryvbas Kryvyi Rih – 33 (2000–2001), Metalurh Donetsk – 319 (2002–2015), Karpaty Lviv – 9 (2010), Zorya Luhansk – 47 (2015–2019)
4	(Ukraine) Oleksandr Chyzhevskyi	401	Karpaty Lviv – 226 (1992–1999, 2002), Shakhtar Donetsk – 9 (1999), FC Metalurh Zaporizhzhia – 38 (2000–2001), Tavriya Simferopol – 87 (2002, 2003–2006), Volyn Lutsk – 1 (2003), Zakarpattia Uzhhorod – 40 (2007–2009)
5	(Ukraine) Oleksandr Horyainov	391	Metalist Kharkiv – 331 (1994, 1998–2003, 2005–present), CSKA Kyiv – 11 (1995–1996), Kryvbas Kryvyi Rih – 49 (2004)
6	(Ukraine) Ruslan Rotan	375	Dnipro – 316 (1999–2005, 2008–2017), Dynamo Kyiv – 59 (2005–2007, 2018)
7	(Ukraine) Serhiy Nazarenko	374	Dnipro – 273 (1999–2001, 2016), Tavriya Simferopol – 77 (2011–2014), Chornomorets Odesa – 10 (2014), Metalist Kharkiv – 14 (2015)
8	(Ukraine) Serhiy Shyshchenko	363	Metalist Kharkiv – 28 (1992–93), Shakhtar Donetsk – 23 (1994,1996), Nyva Ternopil – 28 (1995), Kryvbas Kryvyi Rih – 21 (1997–1998), Metalurh Zaporizhya – 18 (1999, 2006), Metalurh Donetsk – 166 (2000–2003, 2005–2006, 2008–2009), Illichivets – 25 (2004), Chornomorets Odesa – 54 (2006–2007)
9	(Ukraine) Ruslan Kostyshyn	359	CSKA Kyiv – 131 (1996–2001), Dnipro – 109 (2002–2006), Kryvbas Kryvyi Rih – 119 (2007–2012)
10	(Ukraine) Serhiy Zakarlyuka	356	Dnipro – 3 (1994), Arsenal Kyiv – 230 (1996–2001, 2007–present), Metalurh Donetsk – 62 (2002, 2006), Shakhtar Donetsk – 4 (2003), Illichivets – 40 (2004–2005), Vorskla Poltava – (2011)
11	(Ukraine) Oleksandr Hrytsay	354	FC Cheksyl Chernihiv - 21 (1994–1995), Dnipro – 196 (2000–2008), Kryvbas Kryvyi Rih – 10 (2009), Arsenal Kyiv – 70 (2009–2011), Zorya Luhansk – 78 (2012–2015)
12	(Ukraine) Oleksandr Zotov	351	Chornomorets Odesa – 139 (1995–1997, 2007–2008, 2010-present), Kryvbas Kryvyi Rih – 59 (1999–2000), Vorskla Poltava – 12 (2001), Metalurh Donetsk – 133 (2002–2006, 2009), Zakarpattia Uzhhorod – 8 (2009)
13	(Ukraine) Ihor Shukhovtsev	349	SC Odesa – 12 (1992), Nyva Vinnytsia – 17 (1992, 1994–1995), Illichivets – 244 (1997–2003, 2005–2009), Arsenal Kyiv – 9 (2004), Tavriya Simferopol – 9 (2004), Zorya Luhansk – 57 (2009–2011), Metalist Kharkiv – 1 (2009)
14	(Ukraine) Vladyslav Vashchuk	343	Dynamo Kyiv – 254 (1993–2002, 2005–2008), Chornomorets Odesa – 54 (2004–2005, 2009–2010), FC Lviv – 11 (2008), Volyn Lutsk – 24 (2010–2011)
15	(Ukraine) Serhiy Mizin	342	Dynamo Kyiv – 73 (1993–1995), Dnipro – 28 (1996–1997), Chornomorets Odesa – 7 (1996), Arsenal Kyiv – 90 (1997, 2005–2008), Karpaty Lviv – 87 (1998–1999, 2003), Kryvbas Kryvyi Rih – 25 (2000), Metalist Kharkiv – 32 (2001–2002)
16	(Ukraine) Vitaliy Reva	341	Arsenal Kyiv – 237 (1995–2001, 2007–present), Dynamo Kyiv – 50 (2001–2007), Tavriya Simferopol – 13 (2005), Obolon – 10 (2011), FC Kryvbas – 6 (2012)
16	(Uzbekistan) Maksim Shatskikh	341	Dynamo Kyiv – 215 (1999–2009), Arsenal Kyiv – 95 (2010–2012, 2013), Chornomorets Odesa – 6 (2013), Hoverla Uzhhorod – 25 (2014–2015)
18	(Croatia) Darijo Srna	339	Shakhtar Donetsk – 331 (2003–2018)
19	(Ukraine) Andriy Pyatov	332	Vorskla Poltava – 43 (2003–2007), Shakhtar Donetsk – 289 (2007–present)
20	(Ukraine) Andriy Kirlik	331	Metalist Kharkiv – 58 (1994, 1999), Kremin Kremenchuk – 82 (1995–1996), Nyva Ternopil – 29 (1998), Arsenal Kyiv – 47 (2001), Chornomorets Odesa – 115 (2003–2007)
21	(Ukraine) Serhiy Dolhanskyi	328	Veres Rivne – 32 (1992–1993, 1994–1995), Metalist Kharkiv – 12 (1993–1994), Chornomorets Odesa – 51 (1996–1998), Metalurh Donetsk – 21 (2004), Vorskla Poltava – 212 (2001, 2003, 2005–2012)
22	(Ukraine) Valentyn Poltavets	322	Metalurh Zaporizhya – 168 (1994–2000), Dnipro – 45 (2001), Arsenal Kyiv – 24 (2002), Chornomorets Odesa – 85 (2003–2008)
23	(Ukraine) Oleh Husiev	319	Arsenal Kyiv – 23 (2002–2003), Dynamo Kyiv – 296 (2003–2018)
23	(Ukraine) Oleksandr Holovko	319	Tavriya Simferopol – 133 (1992–1994, 2005–2006), Dynamo Kyiv – 186 (1996–2003)
25	(Ukraine) Edmar	316	Tavriya Simferopol – 117 (2003–2007), Metalist Kharkiv – 189 (2009–2015), Dnipro – 10 (2015–2016)
26	(Ukraine) Andriy Vorobey	315	Shakhtar Donetsk – 219 (1997–2007), Dnipro – 47 (2007–2010), Arsenal Kyiv – 23 (2009–2010), Metalist Kharkiv – 26 (2010–2012)
27	(Ukraine) Ihor Luchkevych	311	Metalurh Zaporizhya – 215 (1992–1997, 2003–2005), Metalurh Donetsk – 14 (1998), Karpaty Lviv – 69 (1999–2002), Tavriya Simferopol – 13 (2003)
28	(Ukraine) Volodymyr Yezerskiy	303	Karpaty Lviv – 33 (1997–1998), Dynamo Kyiv – 10 (1999–2000), Kryvbas Kryvyi Rih – 9 (2000), Dnipro – 146 (2001–2007), Shakhtar Donetsk – 21 (2007–2009), Zorya Luhansk – 31 (2010–2011), Tavriya Simferopol – 44 (2011–2013), Hoverla Uzhhorod – 9 (2013)
28	(Serbia) Željko Ljubenović	303	Kryvbas Kryvyi Rih – 9 (2006), Tavriya Simferopol – 148 (2006–2011), Oleksandriya – 9 (2012), Zorya Luhansk – 137 (2012–2018)
30	(Ukraine) Oleh Krasnopyorov	302	Hoverla Uzhhorod – 25 (2001–2002), Illichivets Mariupol – 113 (2002–2008), Vorskla Poltava – 124 (2011–2013), Metalist Kharkiv – 40 (2013–2014)
31	(Ukraine) Oleksandr Hladkyi	300	Metalist Kharkiv – 9 (2004), Kharkiv – 54 (2005–2007), Shakhtar Donetsk – 118 (2007–2011, 2014–2016), Dnipro – 23 (2010–2011), Karpaty Lviv – 81 (2012–2014, 2017), Dynamo Kyiv – 8 (2016), Chornomorets Odesa – 7 (2018)
