= 2005 Ukrainian Cup final =

- Event: 2004–05 Ukrainian Cup
Dynamo Kyiv	Shakhtar Donetsk
1	0
- Date: 29 May 2005
- Venue: NSC Olimpiyskiy, Kyiv
- Referee: Terje Hauge (Norway)
- Attendance: 68,000
- Weather: 32°C

The 2005 Ukrainian Cup final was a football match that took place at the NSC Olimpiyskiy on 29 May 2005. The match was the 14th Ukrainian Cup Final and it was contested by Shakhtar Donetsk and Dynamo Kyiv. The Olympic stadium is the traditional arena for the Cup final. The game was remembered for involving the most foreign players in the Ukrainian Cup finals: out of 36 players on both teams' rosters, 28 were from outside of Ukraine. Of the starting line-ups, there were five Brazilians, four Ukrainians, four Romanians, and others. Refereeing the match was a Norwegian team of referees.

== Road to Kyiv ==
All 16 Ukrainian Premier League clubs do not have to go through qualification to get into the competition; Dynamo and Shakhtar therefore both qualified for the competition automatically.

== Match details ==
2005-05-29
17:00 LST

Dynamo Kyiv	1–0	Shakhtar Donetsk
Diogo Rincón 11' (pen.)	Report

NSC Olimpiyskiy, Kyiv
Attendance: 68,000
Referee: Terje Hauge (Norway)

Dynamo Kyiv	Shakhtar Donetsk

Dynamo Kyiv:
GK	1	(Ukraine) Oleksandr Shovkovskyi (c)
DF	4	(Brazil) Rodolfo	(yellow card) 20'
MF	10	(Romania) Florin Cernat	(substituted off) 54'
MF	15	(Brazil) Diogo Rincón	11' (pen.)	(yellow card) 51'
FW	16	(Uzbekistan) Maxim Shatskikh	(yellow card) 53'	(substituted off) 71'
DF	20	(Ukraine) Oleh Husyev
FW	23	(Latvia) Māris Verpakovskis	(yellow card) 17'
DF	26	(Ukraine) Andriy Nesmachniy
MF	32	(Serbia and Montenegro) Goran Gavrančić	(substituted off) 46'
FW	37	(Nigeria) Ayila Yussuf	(yellow card) 29'
DF	44	(Brazil) Rodrigo	(yellow card) 4'
Substitutes:
GK	33	(Ukraine) Vitaliy Reva
DF	3	(Ukraine) Serhiy Fedorov	(substituted in) 46'
MF	7	(Croatia) Jerko Leko	(substituted in) 54'
MF	8	(Belarus) Valiatsin Bialkevich	(substituted in) 71'
MF	11	(Bulgaria) Georgi Peev
FW	25	(Ukraine) Artem Milevskyi
MF	36	(Serbia and Montenegro) Miloš Ninković
Manager:
(Ukraine) Yozhef Sabo

Shakhtar Donetsk:
GK	16	(Czech Republic) Jan Laštůvka
DF	2	(Romania) Cosmin Bărcăuan	(yellow card) 90'
MF	4	(Ukraine) Anatoliy Tymoshchuk (c)
MF	6	(Serbia and Montenegro) Igor Duljaj	(substituted off) 80'
MF	9	(Brazil) Matuzalém
MF	10	(Serbia and Montenegro) Zvonimir Vukić	(yellow card) 42'	(substituted off) 58'
DF	18	(Poland) Mariusz Lewandowski
FW	25	(Brazil) Brandão
DF	26	(Romania) Răzvan Raț
FW	29	(Romania) Ciprian Marica	(red card) 29'
DF	33	(Croatia) Darijo Srna	(substituted off) 83'
Substitutes:
GK	1	(Croatia) Stipe Pletikosa
DF	3	(Czech Republic) Tomáš Hübschman
FW	11	(Ukraine) Andriy Vorobey	(substituted in) 80'
DF	14	(Romania) Flavius Stoican	(substituted in) 83'
FW	20	(Ukraine) Oleksiy Bielik
MF	36	(Brazil) Elano
MF	38	(Brazil) Jádson	(substituted in) 58'
Manager:
(Romania) Mircea Lucescu

MATCH OFFICIALS

- Assistant referees:
  - Golvik Steiner (Norway)
  - Borgan Ole Germann (Norway)
- Fourth official: Brage Sandmon (Norway)

MATCH RULES

- 90 minutes.
- 30 minutes of extra-time if necessary.
- Penalty shoot-out if scores still level.
- Seven named substitutes
- Maximum of 3 substitutions.

Ukrainian Cup 2005 Winners

Dynamo Kyiv
Seventh title

== See also ==
- 2004–05 Ukrainian Cup
- 2004–05 Ukrainian Premier League
