= 2003 Ukrainian Cup final =

- Event: Ukrainian Cup 2002-03
Dynamo Kyiv	Shakhtar Donetsk
2	1
- Date: 25 May 2003
- Venue: NSC Olimpiyskiy, Kyiv
- Referee: A. Shandor (Lviv)
- Attendance: 71,000
- Weather: 28°C

The 2003 Ukrainian Cup final was a football match that took place at the NSC Olimpiyskiy on 25 May 2003. The match was the 12th Ukrainian Cup Final and it was contested by Dynamo Kyiv and Shakhtar Donetsk. The 2003 Ukrainian Cup Final was the 12th to be held in the Ukrainian capital of Kyiv. Dynamo won the match 2–1.

== Match details ==
2003-05-25
17:00 LST

Dynamo Kyiv	2 – 1	Shakhtar Donetsk
Khatskevich 56'; Diogo Rincón 90+1'	Report	18' Vorobey

NSC Olimpiyskiy, Kyiv
Attendance: 71,000
Referee: Andriy Shandor (Lviv)

Dynamo Kyiv	Shakhtar Donetsk

Dynamo Kyiv:
GK	12	(Ukraine) Vitaliy Reva
DF	26	(Ukraine) Andriy Nesmachniy
DF	3	(Ukraine) Serhiy Fedorov
DF	4	(Ukraine) Oleksandr Holovko
MF	36	(Croatia) Jerko Leko		(substituted off) 46'
FW	16	(Uzbekistan) Maxim Shatskikh
DF	35	(Croatia) Goran Sablić		(substituted off) 18'
MF	32	(Serbia and Montenegro) Goran Gavrančić
MF	14	(Ukraine) Andriy Husin
MF	11	(Bulgaria) Georgi Peev
MF	8	(Belarus) Valiatsin Bialkevich
Substitutes:
GK	33	(Ukraine) Oleksandr Shovkovskyi
DF	XX	(Morocco) Badr El Kaddouri
MF	2	(Belarus) Aliaksandr Khatskevich	(yellow card) 49'	(substituted in) 18'
MF	15	(Brazil) Diogo Rincón		(substituted in) 46'
MF	10	(Romania) Florin Cernat
FW	25	(Ukraine) Artem Milevskyi
MF	36	(Romania) Tiberiu Ghioane
Manager:
(Ukraine) Oleksiy Mykhaylychenko

Shakhtar Donetsk:
GK	12	(Ukraine) Dmytro Shutkov
DF	2	(Ukraine) Mykhailo Starostyak		(substituted off) 40'
DF	22	(Nigeria) Isaac Okoronkwo
DF	24	(Bulgaria) Predrag Pažin
DF	5	(Ukraine) Serhiy Popov	(yellow card) 72'
MF	27	(Serbia and Montenegro) Nenad Lalatović		(substituted off) 79'
DF	18	(Poland) Mariusz Lewandowski
FW	8	(Ukraine) Aleksei Bakharev
MF	15	(Ukraine) Adrian Pukanych
FW	20	(Ukraine) Oleksiy Bielik	(yellow card) 52'	(substituted off) 60'
FW	11	(Ukraine) Andriy Vorobey	(yellow card) 24'
Substitutes:
GK	XX	(Poland) Wojciech Kowalewski
DF	3	(Lithuania) Dainius Gleveckas		(substituted in) 79'
FW	10	(Brazil) Brandão		(substituted in) 60'
DF	13	(Senegal) Assane N'Diaye		(substituted in) 40'
XX	XX	(Ukraine) Hennadiy Zubov
XX	XX	(Ukraine) Ruslan Levyha
XX	XX	(Ukraine) Yevhen Bredun
Manager:
(Ukraine) Valeriy Yaremchenko

MATCH OFFICIALS

- Assistant referees:
  - ? (?)
  - Roman Hamal (Chernivtsi)
- Fourth official: Valeriy Kurhanov (Oleksandriya)

MATCH RULES

- 90 minutes.
- 30 minutes of extra-time if necessary.
- Penalty shoot-out if scores still level.
- Seven named substitutes
- Maximum of 3 substitutions.
