= 2018 Ukrainian Cup final =

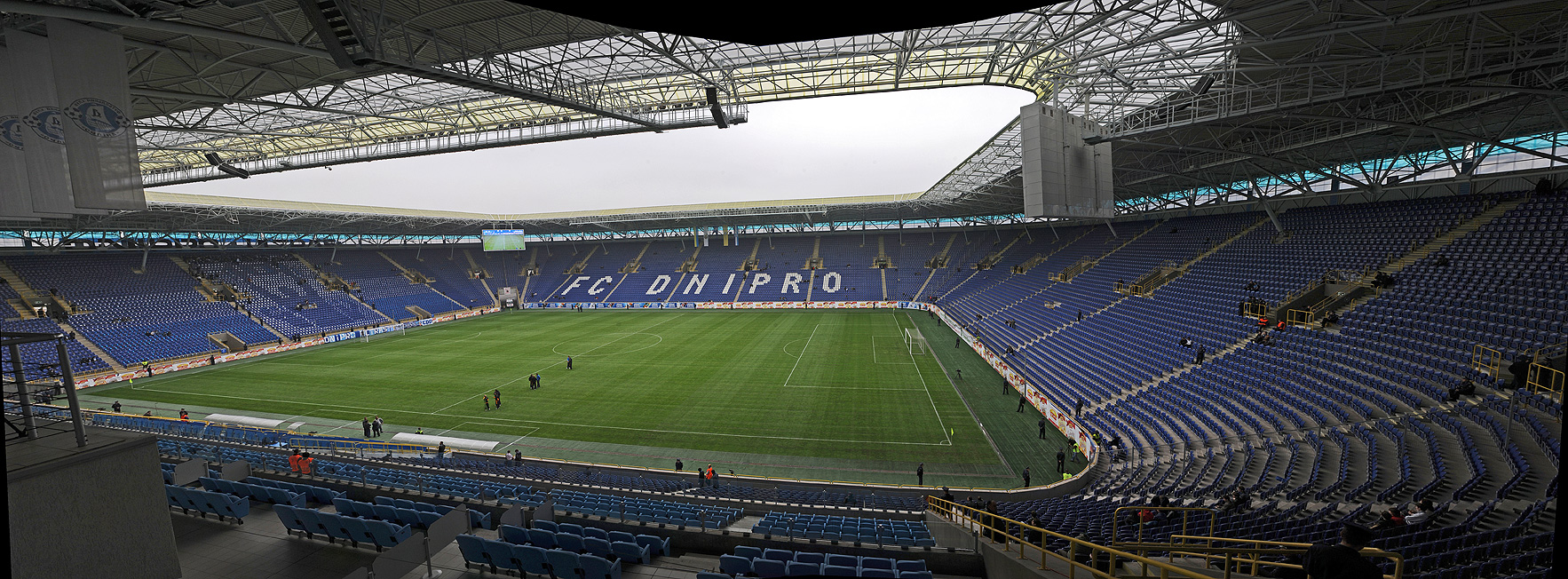
- Event: 2017–18 Ukrainian Cup
Shakhtar Donetsk	Dynamo Kyiv
2	0
- Date: 9 May 2018
- Venue: Dnipro Arena, Dnipro
- Referee: Yuriy Mozharovskyi
- Attendance: 28,155
- Weather: +25°C

The 2018 Ukrainian Cup final was a football match played on May 9, 2018, in Dnipro between Shakhtar Donetsk and Dynamo Kyiv. The culmination of the 2017–18 Ukrainian Cup season, this was the second time the cup final had been held in Dnipro. The match was the 27th Ukrainian Cup Final since the fall of the Soviet Union. Shakhtar Donetsk emerged victorious in the match, defeating Dynamo Kyiv by a score of 2-0.

== Road to Dnipro ==
Note: In all results below, the score of the finalist is given first (H: home; A: away).

Shakhtar Donetsk		Round	Dynamo Kyiv
Opponent	Result	2017–18 Ukrainian Cup	Opponent	Result
Zorya Luhansk	4–3 (A) (aet)	Round of 16	FC Oleksandriya	3–2 (A) (aet)
Veres Rivne	4–0 (H)	Quarter-finals	Desna Chernihiv	2–0 (A)
FC Mariupol	5–1 (H)	Semi-finals	SC Dnipro-1	4–1 (A)

== Previous encounters ==
The game between Shakhtar and Dynamo has become the main fixture of every season and received a nickname of Klasychne ("Classic"). Before this game, both teams had met in Ukrainian Cup finals nine times, the first being in 2002. Games between the two clubs are known to be very intense and out of the nine previous finals fixtures, only two - 2003 and 2017 - did not have red cards shown to players. There were a total of 14 red cards shown, with 13 in finals alone.

Before this final, out of the previous nine, Dynamo had won five, one on penalty kicks, while Shakhtar had won four. In total, both teams met in this competition 13 times, once in semifinals, once in quarterfinals, once in round of 16 and once in round of 32. The total record is +4=1-8 in favor of Shakhtar. There were only two games in which Shakhtar did not score against Dynamo, in 2005 and in 2015.

It was Shakhtar's 150th game in the Ukrainian Cup competition. This was Dynamo's 16th time reaching the final stage. Both teams won the cup trophy an even number of times, 11 apiece. It was the eighth consecutive final for The Miners since 2011.

Before the final, in 2017–18 season Shakhtar and Dynamo has met three times within the league competition where Dynamo has won two and one game was tied.

For Yuriy Mozharovskyi this was the third cup final. With him, Dynamo had already beat Shakhtar twice; however, considering results of the Ukrainian Super Cup in 2014, total tally between those teams with this referee at such level is 2 to 1 respectfully.

== Before the game ==
The game was scheduled on the day of the former Soviet holiday Victory Day that was continued to be celebrated in the Russian Federation as a national holiday.

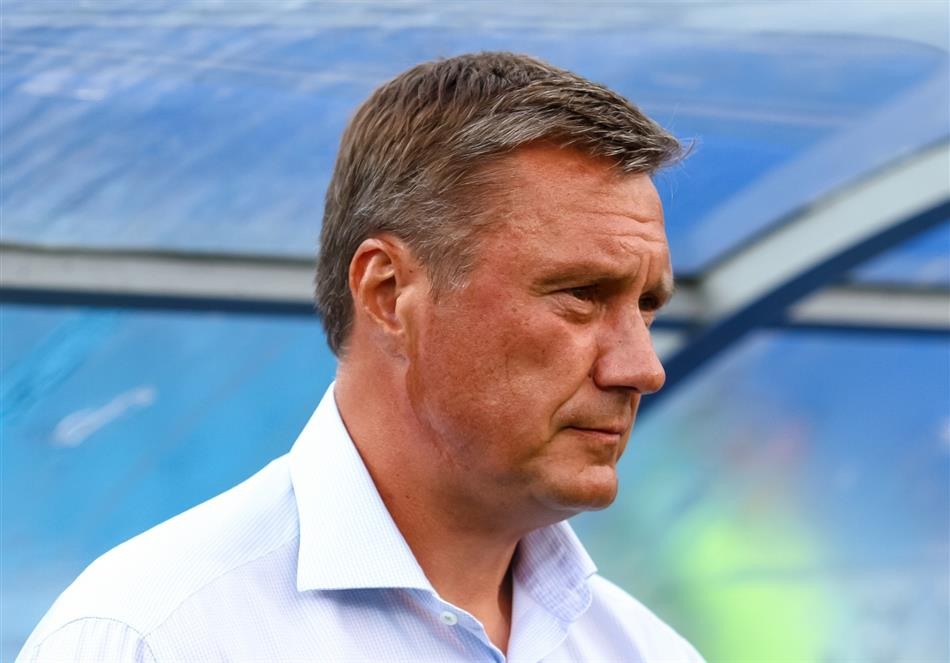
For Dynamo manager Aliaksandr Khatskevich, this was the first final of the Ukrainian Cup as a coach

Before the final in interview to the Football Federation of Ukraine (FFU) website Dynamo manager Aliaksandr Khatskevich stated that his team intends to continue to compete for the championship, despite trailing five points behind the Miners with just two more rounds before finish line. However, with the victory in the Cup, Dynamo was also happy. Identifying the key players in Shakhtar, the head coach of Dynamo pointed to Pyatov, Rakitskiy, and Taison. Khatskevich stated that he considers them leaders in each of the team's positions. At the end the Dynamo's manager drew attention that today's game was differ from previous ones in which Kyivans had not yielded to Miners. In the championship the White Blues defeated Donchans twice and one time a game ended in draw.

At the same time Shakhtar, manager Paulo Fonseca, also giving an interview to the FFU website, stated that he anticipates a very difficult and emotional match against Dynamo in the final of Ukrainian Cup. According to the Portuguese, both teams have changed significantly compared with the last years final, in which Shakhtar beat Dynamo Kyiv (1–0). He then also explained why games with Dynamo are for him special and at the end highlighted the principles on which the game of his team is built.

According to the Ukrainian international and Shakhtar player Marlos Kyiv became stronger in comparison with last years final. Another Ukraine international and Dynamo player Ruslan Rotan stated that Dynamo play with two ex-Dniprians: Denys Boiko and him. Nonetheless, Dnipro fans were cheering for Dynamo as there are traditionally more affiliated with the club. Active fans of Dnipro and Kyivan clubs befriend with one another therefore the support was on the Dynamo's side.

Before the game, a street brawl occurred between both sets of fans, which consequently led to some 20 individuals being detained, according to a representative of local police. One police officer received a burn injury due to the use of a pyrotechnic device and a police patrol vehicle had been vandalized.

Some minor technical issue occurred when about 15 minutes before the match, the stadium lights stopped working, and only scoreboard and commercial ads boards worked.

== Match ==
9 May 2018
20:30

Shakhtar Donetsk	2–0	Dynamo Kyiv
Ferreyra 47'; Rakitskyi 61'	Report

Dnipro Arena, Dnipro
Attendance: 28,155
Referee: Yuriy Mozharovskyi, Lviv

Shakhtar Donetsk	Dynamo Kyiv

Shakhtar Donetsk:
GK	30	(Ukraine) Andriy Pyatov
RB	2	(Ukraine) Bohdan Butko		(substituted off) 90'
CB	4	(Ukraine) Serhiy Kryvtsov
CB	44	(Ukraine) Yaroslav Rakitskyi
LB	31	(Brazil) Ismaily
DM	6	(Ukraine) Taras Stepanenko	(yellow card) 83'
DM	8	(Brazil) Fred	(yellow card) 32'
RW	11	(Brazil) Marlos
AW	21	(Brazil) Alan Patrick		(substituted off) 65'
LM	7	(Brazil) Taison (c)
CF	19	(Argentina) Facundo Ferreyra		(substituted off) 77'
Substitutes:
GK	26	(Ukraine) Mykyta Shevchenko
DF	5	(Georgia (country)) David Khocholava		(substituted on) 90'
DF	98	(Brazil) Dodô
MF	12	(Brazil) Wellington Nem
MF	74	(Ukraine) Viktor Kovalenko		(substituted on) 65'
MF	9	(Brazil) Dentinho
FW	88	(Nigeria) Olarenwaju Kayode		(substituted on) 77'
Manager:
(Portugal) Paulo Fonseca

Dynamo Kyiv:
GK	71	(Ukraine) Denys Boyko
RB	94	(Poland) Tomasz Kędziora	(yellow card) 62'
CB	26	(Ukraine) Mykyta Burda
CB	44	(Hungary) Tamás Kádár
LB	23	(Croatia) Josip Pivarić
DM	19	(Ukraine) Denys Harmash	(yellow card) 80'
DM	8	(Ukraine) Volodymyr Shepelyev	(yellow card) 68'
RW	15	(Ukraine) Viktor Tsyhankov (c)
AM	40	(Ukraine) Mykola Shaparenko		(substituted off) 66'
LW	7	(Slovenia) Benjamin Verbič		(substituted off) 86'
CF	41	(Ukraine) Artem Besyedin	(yellow card) 28'
Substitutes:
GK	72	(Ukraine) Artur Rudko
MF	17	(Ukraine) Ruslan Rotan
MF	46	(Ukraine) Akhmed Alibekov
MF	9	(Ukraine) Mykola Morozyuk
MF	99	(Ukraine) Heorhiy Tsitaishvili		(substituted on) 86'
DF	30	(Ukraine) Artem Shabanov
CF	70	(Democratic Republic of the Congo) Dieumerci Mbokani		(substituted on) 68'
Manager:
(Belarus) Aliaksandr Khatskevich

MAN OF THE MATCH

MATCH OFFICIALS

- Assistant referees:
  - O.Voityuk (Kharkiv)
  - S.Bekker (Zaporizhia)
- Fourth official:
  - V.Romanov (Dnipro)
- Supervisor of refereeing:
  - V.Derdo (Chornomorsk)

MATCH RULES

- 90 minutes.
- 30 minutes of extra-time if necessary.
- Penalty shoot-out if scores still level.
- Seven named substitutes.
- Maximum of 3 substitutions.

=== Statistics ===
Shakhtar Donetsk	Statistic	Dynamo Kyiv
2	Goals	0
4	Shots on target	3
15	Shots towards goal	10
5	Corners	5
1	Off-sides	5
13	Fouls	23
2	Cautioned fouls	4
0	Ejections	0
56	Ball possessions (%)	44

== After the game ==
In the last few minutes of the game, Shakhtar right back Bohdan Butko suffered an injury on the 90th minute and was stretchered off the field. He was replaced by David Khocholava. During the game, Butko assisted the first goal by Ferreyra.

In the post game press conference, Khatskevich stated that no one showed oneself expressively and he won't point to nobody. The team lost all together. He stated that Dynamo were punished for their own mistakes, but when Shakhtar were making mistakes, Dynamo failed to punish them. This says about the class of footballers. Khatskevich pointed that Dynamo have good young lads, but there is work to be done, in terms of mentality, technique and tactics.

During a "Futbol 1" broadcast, Fonseca stated that today that they were the team that dominated in the game, and that Shakhtar throughout the game were closer to goals than Dynamo. He noted that the Dynamo Kyiv defense was strong and organized but today Shakhtar had the correct tactics. Shakhtar showed patience and was scoring at right moments.

== See also ==
- 2017–18 Ukrainian Premier League
