= 2004 Ukrainian Cup final =

- Event: 2003–04 Ukrainian Cup
Dnipro Dnipropetrovsk	Shakhtar Donetsk
0	2
- Date: 30 May 2004
- Venue: NSC Olimpiyskiy, Kyiv
- Referee: Serhiy Shebek (Kyiv)
- Attendance: 68,000
- Weather: 24 °C

The 2004 Ukrainian Cup final was a football match that took place at the NSC Olimpiyskiy on 30 May 2004. The match was the 13th Ukrainian Cup Final and it was contested by Shakhtar Donetsk and Dnipro Dnipropetrovsk. The Olympic stadium is the traditional arena for the cup final. Shakhtar Donetsk beat Dnipropetrovsk 2-0.

== Road to Kyiv ==
All 16 Ukrainian Premier League clubs do not have to go through qualification to get into the competition; Dnipro and Shakhtar therefore both qualified for the competition automatically.

== Match details ==
2004-05-30
17:00 LST

Dnipro Dnipropetrovsk	0–2	Shakhtar Donetsk
	Report	1' Bielik; 88' Tymoshchuk

NSC Olimpiyskiy, Kyiv
Attendance: 68,000
Referee: Serhiy Shebek (Kyiv)

Dnipro Dnipropetrovsk	Shakhtar Donetsk

Dnipro Dnipropetrovsk:
GK	23	(Ukraine) Vyacheslav Kernozenko
DF	14	(Ukraine) Oleksandr Radchenko	(substituted off) 65'
DF	16	(Ukraine) Andriy Rusol
MF	19	(Ukraine) Dmytro Mykhailenko	(substituted off) 46'
DF	5	(Ukraine) Volodymyr Yezersky
MF	6	(Ukraine) Oleh Shelayev	(red card) 31'
MF	20	(Ukraine) Oleksandr Rykun	(yellow card) 76'
MF	28	(Ukraine) Serhiy Nazarenko	(yellow card) 86'
MF	29	(Ukraine) Ruslan Rotan	(yellow card) 33'
MF	10	(Ukraine) Ruslan Kostyshyn	(substituted off) 78'
FW	11	(Ukraine) Oleh Venhlynsky	(yellow card) 4'
Substitutes:
?	?	(Ukraine) Oleksandr Poklonskyi
MF	8	(Ukraine) Roman Maksymiuk	(substituted on) 65'
DF	25	(Ukraine) Oleksandr Hrytsay	(substituted on) 46'
FW	24	(Ukraine) Serhiy Motuz	(substituted on) 78'
GK	?	(Ukraine) Artem Kusliy
DF	?	(Ukraine) Serhiy Matiukhin
FW	?	(Ukraine) Oleksandr Melashchenko
Manager:
(Ukraine) Yevhen Kucherevsky

Shakhtar Donetsk:
GK	12	(Ukraine) Dmytro Shutkov
DF	2	(Ukraine) Mykhailo Starostiak
MF	4	(Ukraine) Anatoliy Tymoshchuk	88'
DF	5	(Ukraine) Serhiy Popov
MF	10	(Serbia and Montenegro) Zvonimir Vukić	(yellow card) 85'	(substituted off) 89'
FW	11	(Ukraine) Andriy Vorobey	(yellow card) 45'
DF	14	(Romania) Flavius Stoican	(red card) 30'
MF	18	(Poland) Mariusz Lewandowski
FW	20	(Ukraine) Oleksiy Bielik	1'	(substituted off) 35'
DF	26	(Romania) Răzvan Raț
DF	28	(Romania) Daniel Florea	(substituted off) 68'
Substitutes:
GK	?	(Russia) Alexey Botvinyev
MF	?	(Ukraine) Hennadiy Zubov
MF	6	(Serbia and Montenegro) Igor Duljaj	(substituted on) 35'
MF	8	(Ukraine) Alexey Bakharev	(substituted on) 68'	(yellow card) 83'
FW	25	(Brazil) Brandão
FW	29	(Romania) Ciprian Marica	(substituted on) 89'
DF	?	(Lithuania) Dainius Gleveckas
Manager:
(Romania) Mircea Lucescu

MATCH OFFICIALS

- Assistant referees:
  - Mykola Danevych (Kyiv)
  - Andriy Zvieriev (Brovary)
- Fourth official: Oleh Oriekhov (Kyiv)

MATCH RULES

- 90 minutes.
- 30 minutes of extra-time if necessary.
- Penalty shoot-out if scores still level.
- Seven named substitutes
- Maximum of 3 substitutions.

Ukrainian Cup 2004 Winners

Shakhtar Donetsk
Fifth title

== See also ==
- Ukrainian Cup 2003-04
- Ukrainian Premier League 2003-04
