= 2013 Ukrainian Cup final =

- Event: 2012–13 Ukrainian Cup
| Shakhtar Donetsk | Chornomorets Odesa |
| 3 | 0 |
- Date: 22 May 2013
- Venue: OSK "Metalist", Kharkiv
- Referee: Yevhen Aranovsky (Kyiv)

The 2013 Ukrainian Cup final was a football match that was played at the Metalist Stadium, Kharkiv, on 22 May 2013. The match was the 22nd Ukrainian Cup Final and was contested by the champions of Ukraine Shakhtar Donetsk and Chornomorets Odesa. This was the third time that the final match had returned to Kharkiv.

Since Shakhtar had qualified for the 2013–14 UEFA Champions League, Chornomorets would then qualify for the 2013–14 UEFA Europa League. During the draw for the semi-finals, the matchup Shakhtar Donetsk–Sevastopol was identified as the home team for the final.

== Road to Kharkiv ==
As Ukrainian Premier League members Shakhtar Donetsk and Chornomorets Odesa did not have to go through the qualification phase of the competition.

Shakhtar Donetsk

| Round 1 | Shakhtar Donetsk | 4 – 1 | Dynamo Kyiv |
| Round 2 | Hoverla Uzhhorod | 1 – 4 | Shakhtar Donetsk |
| Quarter-final | Shakhtar Donetsk | 2 – 1 | Karpaty Lviv |
| Semi-final | Sevastopol | 2 – 4 | Shakhtar Donetsk |

Chornomorets Odesa

| Round 1 | Chornomorets Odesa | 2 – 0 | Metalurh Donetsk |
| Round 2 | UkrAhroKom Pryiutivka | 1 – 2 | Chornomorets Odesa |
| Quarter-final | Arsenal Kyiv | 1 – 2 | Chornomorets Odesa |
| Semi-final | Chornomorets Odesa | 2 – 1 | Dnipro Dnipropetrovsk |

== Previous encounters ==
This was the first Ukrainian Cup final between the two teams. The two teams also met in the semi-finals in 2007–08, 2003–04 and 1994–95. On all three occasions, Shakhtar was victorious.

Chornomorets had appeared only twice in a Cup final winning on both occasions and their opponents Shakhtar had appeared in 12 Cup finals, winning eight of them.

== Television ==
As last year, the match was broadcast on ICTV in Ukraine.

== Match ==
=== Details ===
22 May 2013
19:45 EEST

| Shakhtar Donetsk | 3 – 0 | Chornomorets Odesa |
|---|---|---|
| Fernandinho 41'; Teixeira 53'; Taison 73' | Report |

OSK "Metalist", Kharkiv
Attendance: 40,003
Referee: Yevhen Aranovsky (Kyiv)

| Shakhtar Donetsk | Chornomorets Odesa |

Shakhtar Donetsk:
| GK | 32 | (Ukraine) Anton Kanibolotskiy |
| RB | 33 | (Croatia) Darijo Srna (c) | (yellow card) 90+1' |
| CB | 5 | (Ukraine) Oleksandr Kucher |
| CB | 44 | (Ukraine) Yaroslav Rakitskiy |
| LB | 13 | (Ukraine) Vyacheslav Shevchuk | (yellow card) 57' |
| DM | 3 | (Czech Republic) Tomáš Hübschman | (substituted off) 78' |
| DM | 7 | (Brazil) Fernandinho | 41' (substituted off) 67' |
| RW | 29 | (Brazil) Alex Teixeira | 53' |
| AM | 22 | (Armenia) Henrikh Mkhitaryan |
| LW | 28 | (Brazil) Taison | 73' |
| CF | 9 | (Brazil) Luiz Adriano | (substituted off) 78' |
Substitutes:
| GK | 30 | (Ukraine) Andriy Pyatov |
| MF | 6 | (Ukraine) Taras Stepanenko | (substituted on) 78' |
| FW | 11 | (Croatia) Eduardo | (substituted on) 78' |
| MF | 14 | (Ukraine) Vasyl Kobin |
| MF | 19 | (Ukraine) Oleksiy Gai |
| MF | 20 | (Brazil) Douglas Costa | (substituted on) 67' (yellow card) 90' |
| DF | 38 | (Ukraine) Serhiy Kryvtsov |
Manager:
(Romania) Mircea Lucescu

Chornomorets Odesa:
| GK | 12 | (Ukraine) Dmytro Bezotosnyi (c) |
| DF | 4 | (Austria) Markus Berger |
| MF | 6 | (Brazil) Léo Matos | (substituted off) 83' |
| MF | 8 | (Ukraine) Kyrylo Kovalchuk |
| FW | 19 | (Albania) Elis Bakaj | (yellow card) 73' |
| FW | 20 | (Romania) Lucian Burdujan | (yellow card) 66' |
| FW | 23 | (Ivory Coast) Franck Dja Djédjé | (substituted off) 67' |
| DF | 29 | (Argentina) Pablo Fontanello |
| DF | 32 | (Albania) Kristi Vangjeli |
| MF | 39 | (Ukraine) Artem Starhorodskyi | (substituted off) 46' |
| MF | 42 | (Ukraine) Yevhen Zubeyko |
Substitutes:
| GK | 1 | (Ukraine) Yevhen Past |
| DF | 2 | (Ukraine) Petro Kovalchuk |
| FW | 9 | (Ukraine) Anatoliy Didenko | (substituted on) 46' (yellow card) 68' |
| GK | 13 | (Ukraine) Yuriy Martyshchuk |
| FW | 16 | (Uzbekistan) Maksim Shatskikh |
| DF | 33 | (Ukraine) Andriy Slinkin | (substituted on) 83' |
| FW | 99 | (Spain) Sito Riera | (substituted on) 67' |
Manager:
(Ukraine) Roman Hryhorchuk

MAN OF THE MATCH

MATCH OFFICIALS

- Assistant referees:
  - Oleksandr Voitiuk (Zaporizhya)
  - Oleh Pluzhyk (Kharkiv)
- Fourth official:
  - Serhiy Bekker (Kharkiv)

MATCH RULES

- 90 minutes.
- 30 minutes of extra-time if necessary.
- Penalty shoot-out if scores still level.
- Seven named substitutes
- Maximum of 3 substitutions.

== Match statistics ==
| | Shakhtar Donetsk | Chornomorets Odesa |
|---|---|---|
| Total shots | 16 | 5 |
| Shots on target | 8 | 2 |
| Ball possession | ?% | ?% |
| Corner kicks | 8 | 2 |
| Fouls committed | ? | ? |
| Offsides | 0 | 2 |
| Yellow cards | 3 | 3 |
| Red cards | 0 | 0 |

== See also ==
- 2012–13 Ukrainian Premier League
