= 2014 Ukrainian Cup final =

- Event: 2013–14 Ukrainian Cup
Dynamo Kyiv	Shakhtar Donetsk
2	1
- Date: 15 May 2014
- Venue: Vorskla Stadium, Poltava
- Referee: Yuriy Mozharovsky (Lviv)
- Attendance: 9,700
- Weather: 21°C

The 2014 Ukrainian Cup final was a football match that was played on 15 May 2014 in Poltava. The match was the 23rd Ukrainian Cup Final and was contested by Cup holders Shakhtar Donetsk and Dynamo Kyiv.

== Leadup crisis before the match ==
The final was originally to be played at Metalist Stadium, Kharkiv, but was moved to Vorskla Stadium in Poltava. Due to the pro-Russian unrest in the country, the Football Federation of Ukraine (FFU), after being advised to do so by the Ukrainian Interior Ministry, decided that the match would be played behind closed doors for security reasons.

The decision to have no spectators at the match was met with criticism and protest by both clubs' fans including picketing of the House of Football in Kyiv a day before the match and was reverted after the FFU held an emergency meeting and conferred with club officials and government security.

== Road to Poltava ==
Shakhtar Donetsk

Round 1	Illichivets Mariupol	0 – 3	Shakhtar Donetsk
Round 2	MFC Mykolaiv	0 – 3	Shakhtar Donetsk
Quarter-final	Desna Chernihiv	0 – 2	Shakhtar Donetsk
Semi-final	Slavutych Cherkasy	0 – 3 (aet)	Shakhtar Donetsk

Dynamo Kyiv

Round 1	Dynamo Kyiv	3 – 2	Metalurh Donetsk
Round 2	Shakhtar Sverdlovsk	0 – 4	Dynamo Kyiv
Quarter-final	Metalist Kharkiv	2 – 3	Dynamo Kyiv
Semi-final	Dynamo Kyiv	4 – 0	Chornomorets Odesa

== Previous encounters ==
This was the seventh Ukrainian Cup final between the two teams. Dynamo has defeated Shakhtar three times out of the six Cup finals. Dynamo also lost its last two meetings with Shakhtar in this stage of the tournament. Dynamo has not defeated Shakhtar for the past seven years (seven games losing streak) since winning its last cup back in 2006–07.

Dynamo had appeared in 12 cup finals, winning nine trophies, while opponents Shakhtar had appeared in 13 cup finals, also winning nine.

== Television ==
The match was broadcast on Futbol 2 and Ukrayina in Ukraine.

== Match ==
As the designated home team for the final, Dynamo chose to wear their blue and white kits and Shakhtar chose their familiar orange and black kits.

=== Details ===
15 May 2014
20:00 EEST

Dynamo Kyiv	2–1	Shakhtar Donetsk
Kucher 40' (o.g.); Vida 43'	Report	Douglas 57'

Vorskla Stadium, Poltava
Attendance: 9,700
Referee: Yuriy Mozharovsky (Lviv)

Dynamo Kyiv	Shakhtar Donetsk

GK	1	(Ukraine) Oleksandr Shovkovskyi (c)
RB	2	(Brazil) Danilo Silva
CB	6	(Austria) Aleksandar Dragović	(yellow card) 90+4'
CB	24	(Croatia) Domagoj Vida
LB	27	(Ukraine) Yevhen Makarenko
DM	4	(Portugal) Miguel Veloso
RM	10	(Ukraine) Andriy Yarmolenko	(yellow card) 70' (yellow-red card) 90+4'
CM	90	(Morocco) Younès Belhanda		(substituted off) 85'
CM	19	(Ukraine) Denys Harmash		(substituted off) 89'
LM	7	(Netherlands) Jeremain Lens		(substituted off) 71'
CF	85	(Democratic Republic of the Congo) Dieumerci Mbokani	(yellow card) 45+3'
Substitutes:
GK	23	(Ukraine) Oleksandr Rybka
DF	3	(Ukraine) Yevhen Selin
MF	5	(Croatia) Ognjen Vukojević	(yellow card) 90+1'	(substituted in) 71'
MF	16	(Ukraine) Serhiy Sydorchuk		(substituted in) 85'
MF	45	(Ukraine) Vladyslav Kalytvyntsev		(substituted in) 89'
FW	9	(Ukraine) Roman Bezus
FW	11	(Nigeria) Brown Ideye
Manager:
(Ukraine) Serhii Rebrov

GK	30	(Ukraine) Andriy Pyatov
RB	33	(Croatia) Darijo Srna (c)	(yellow card) 45'	(substituted off) 79'
CB	5	(Ukraine) Oleksandr Kucher
CB	44	(Ukraine) Yaroslav Rakitskiy	(yellow card) 31' (yellow-red card) 90+4'
LB	13	(Ukraine) Vyacheslav Shevchuk
CM	6	(Ukraine) Taras Stepanenko
CM	8	(Brazil) Fred	(yellow card) 90+4'
RW	20	(Brazil) Douglas Costa
AM	29	(Brazil) Alex Teixeira
LW	10	(Brazil) Bernard		(substituted off) 69'
CF	9	(Brazil) Luiz Adriano	(yellow card) 90+2'
Substitutes:
GK	32	(Ukraine) Anton Kanibolotskiy
DF	3	(Czech Republic) Tomáš Hübschman
DF	31	(Brazil) Ismaily
DF	38	(Ukraine) Serhiy Kryvtsov		(substituted in) 79'
MF	17	(Brazil) Fernando
FW	11	(Croatia) Eduardo		(substituted in) 69'
FW	89	(Brazil) Dentinho
Manager:
(Romania) Mircea Lucescu

Match officials:

- Assistant referees:
  - Serhiy Bekker (Kharkiv)
  - Semyon Shlonchak (Cherkasy)
- Fourth official:
  - Anatoliy Abdulla

Match rules

- 90 minutes
- 30 minutes of extra-time if necessary
- Penalty shoot-out if scores still level
- Seven named substitutes
- Maximum of three substitutions

== Match statistics ==
Tournament official website

Teams	Dynamo	Shakhtar
Total shots	14	3
Shots on target	7	3
Ball possession	?%	?%
Corner kicks	5	6
Fouls committed	?	?
Offsides	1	1
Yellow cards	4	3
Red cards	1	1

== See also ==
- 2013–14 Ukrainian Premier League
