= Oleksandr Holovko =

Ukrainian footballer (born 1972)

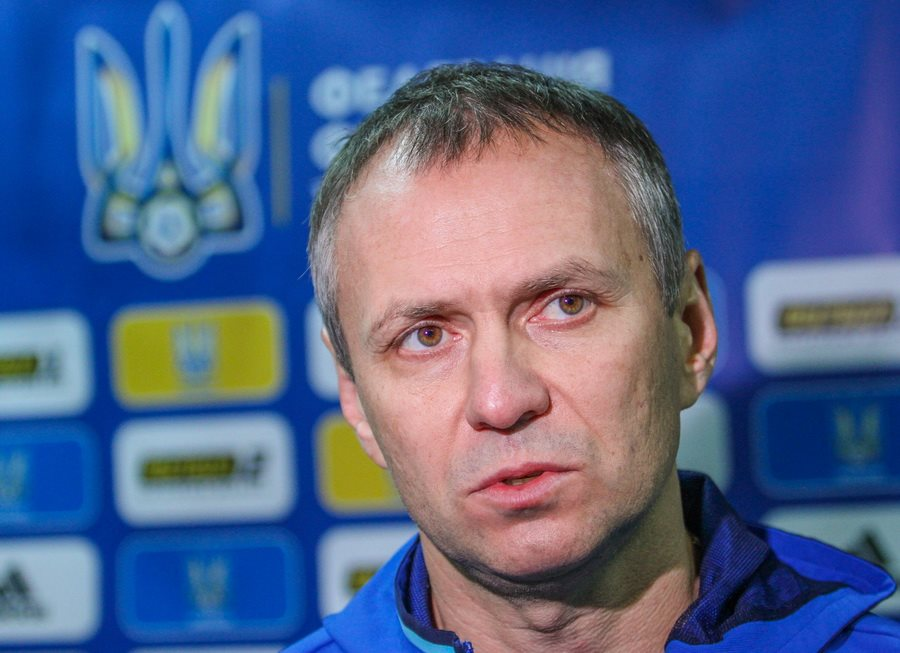
- Holovko in 2016

Personal information
- Full name: Oleksandr Borysovych Holovko
- Date of birth: 6 January 1972 (age 54)
- Place of birth: Kherson, Ukrainian SSR (now Ukraine)
- Height: 1.86 m (6 ft 1 in)
- Position: Centre-back

Team information
- Current team: Dinaz Vyshhorod (manager)

Youth career
- 1990–1993: Tavriya Simferopol

Senior career*
Years	Team	Apps	(Gls)
1992–1995	Tavriya Simferopol	133	(4)
1995–2004	Dynamo Kyiv	230	(9)
1997	→ Dynamo-2 Kyiv	1	(0)
1998	→ Dynamo-2 Kyiv	1	(0)
2000	→ Dynamo-2 Kyiv	1	(0)
2001	→ Dynamo-2 Kyiv	1	(0)
2003	→ Dynamo-2 Kyiv	3	(1)
2004	Qingdao Beilaite	19	(0)
2005–2006	Tavriya Simferopol	25	(0)
Total		414	(14)

International career
1995–2004	Ukraine	58	(0)

Managerial career
- 2007–2010: Ukraine U18
- 2010–2011: Ukraine U19
- 2011–2012: Ukraine U16
- 2012–2013: Ukraine U17
- 2013–2014: Ukraine U18
- 2014–2015: Ukraine U19
- 2015–2017: Ukraine U20
- 2015–2018: Ukraine U21
- 2020: Kremin Kremenchuk
- 2022–2026: Dinaz Vyshhorod
Medal record
SC Tavriya Simferopol
Winner	Ukrainian Top League	1992
Runner-up	Ukrainian Cup	1993-94
FC Dynamo Kyiv
Winner	Ukrainian Top League	1995-96
Winner	Ukrainian Top League	1996-97
Winner	Ukrainian Top League	1997-98
Winner	Ukrainian Top League	1998-99
Winner	Ukrainian Top League	1999-00
Winner	Ukrainian Top League	2000-01
Winner	Ukrainian Top League	2002-03
Winner	Ukrainian Cup	1995-96
Winner	Ukrainian Cup	1997-98
Winner	Ukrainian Cup	1998-99
Winner	Ukrainian Cup	1999-00
Winner	Ukrainian Cup	2002-03
- * Club domestic league appearances and goals

Oleksandr Borysovych Holovko (Ukrainian: Олександр Борисович Головко; born 6 January 1972) is a Ukrainian football manager and former player who manages Dinaz Vyshhorod. A centre-back, Holovko used to be a regular starter for the Ukraine national team. He earned eight Ukrainian Vyshcha Liha titles with Tavriya Simferopol and Dynamo Kyiv.

== Career ==
Holovko played for three clubs: Tavriya Simferopol, Dynamo Kyiv and Qingdao Beilaite (P.R. China). A central or right defender, Holovko helped lead Dynamo Kyiv to many victories in the UEFA Champions League, culminating in a semifinal finish in 1998–1999. He was also a regular member of the Ukraine national team from 1995 to 2004, having appeared in 58 international matches (among the cap leaders for Ukraine). As for playing his career, he stopped his career at the age of 38.

Holovko started as a coach of the Ukrainian Under 16 Youth National Team. The team competed in September 2008 for qualification to the 2009 UEFA U-17 Championships.

== Personal life ==
He has a son, also named Oleksandr, born in 1995, who is also a professional footballer.
