= 2017 Ukrainian Cup final =

- Event: 2016–17 Ukrainian Cup
Shakhtar Donetsk	Dynamo Kyiv
1	0
- Date: 17 May 2017
- Venue: Metalist Stadium, Kharkiv
- Referee: Kostiantyn Trukhanov
- Attendance: 25,000
- Weather: 10°C

The 2017 Ukrainian Cup final was a football match played on May 17, 2017 in Kharkiv between Shakhtar Donetsk and Dynamo Kyiv. The culmination of the 2016–17 Ukrainian Cup season, this was the fourth time the cup final was held in Kharkiv. The match was the 26th Ukrainian Cup Final since fall of the Soviet Union.

== Regular season ==
Note: In all results below, the score of the finalist is given first (H: home; A: away).

FC Shakhtar Donetsk		Round	FC Dynamo Kyiv
Opponent	Result	2016–17 Ukrainian Cup	Opponent	Result
FC Oleksandriya	2−1 (H)	Round of 16	Zorya Luhansk	5–2 (H) (aet)
FC Poltava	w/o (A)	Quarter-finals	Naftovyk-Ukrnafta Okhtyrka	1–0 (A)
FC Dnipro	1–0 (H)	Semi-finals	MFC Mykolaiv	4–0 (A)

== Previous encounters ==
The game between Shakhtar and Dynamo has become the main fixture of every season and received the nickname of Klasychne which means Classic. Before this game both teams met in a final of Ukrainian Cup eight times, the first being back in 2002. Before this final out of the previous eight, Shakhtar won 3 games and Dynamo won 4, one more game Dynamo won on penalty kicks. Games between the two clubs are known to be very intense and out of the eight previous meetings in the final, only one in 2003 did not have red cards shown to players.

== Match ==
=== Details ===
17 May 2017
21:00

Shakhtar Donetsk	1–0	Dynamo Kyiv
Marlos 81'	Report

Metalist Stadium, Kharkiv
Attendance: 25,000
Referee: Kostiantyn Trukhanov

Shakhtar Donetsk	Dynamo Kyiv

Shakhtar Donetsk:
GK	30	(Ukraine) Andriy Pyatov	(yellow card) 90+3'
RB	33	(Croatia) Darijo Srna (c)	(yellow card) 55'
CB	5	(Ukraine) Oleksandr Kucher
CB	44	(Ukraine) Yaroslav Rakitskiy
LB	31	(Brazil) Ismaily
DM	6	(Ukraine) Taras Stepanenko
DM	74	(Ukraine) Viktor Kovalenko		(substituted off) 83'
RW	11	(Ukraine) Marlos
AW	28	(Brazil) Taison
LM	10	(Brazil) Bernard		(substituted off) 90+1'
CF	19	(Argentina) Facundo Ferreyra	(yellow card) 77'	(substituted off) 90+3'
Substitutes:
GK	26	(Ukraine) Mykyta Shevchenko
DF	18	(Ukraine) Ivan Ordets		(substituted in) 90+3'
DF	2	(Ukraine) Bohdan Butko
DM	17	(Ukraine) Maksym Malyshev		(substituted in) 83'
MF	59	(Ukraine) Oleksandr Zubkov		(substituted in) 90+1'
FW	9	(Brazil) Dentinho
FW	99	(Argentina) Gustavo Blanco Leschuk
Manager:
(Portugal) Paulo Fonseca

Dynamo Kyiv:
GK	35	(Ukraine) Maksym Koval
RB	9	(Ukraine) Mykola Morozyuk
CB	4	(Serbia) Aleksandar Pantić
CB	24	(Croatia) Domagoj Vida
CB	44	(Hungary) Tamás Kádár	(yellow card) 77'	(substituted off) 81'
LB	5	(Portugal) Vitorino Antunes
MF	8	(Ukraine) Volodymyr Shepelyev
MF	16	(Ukraine) Serhiy Sydorchuk	(yellow card) 54'	(substituted off) 68'
MR	10	(Ukraine) Andriy Yarmolenko (c)
ML	19	(Ukraine) Denys Harmash	(yellow card) 90+2'
CF	41	(Ukraine) Artem Besyedin
Substitutes:
GK	72	(Ukraine) Artur Rudko
DF	14	(Ukraine) Zurab Ochigava
MF	15	(Ukraine) Viktor Tsyhankov		(substituted in) 81'
MF	17	(Ukraine) Serhiy Rybalka		(substituted in) 68'
MF	25	(Paraguay) Derlis González
DF	26	(Ukraine) Mykyta Burda
MF	29	(Ukraine) Vitaliy Buyalskyi
Manager:
(Ukraine) Serhii Rebrov

MAN OF THE MATCH

MATCH OFFICIALS

- Assistant referees:
  - Oleksandr Voityuk
  - Oleh Pluzhnyk
- Fourth official:
  - Yuriy Mozharovskyi

MATCH RULES

- 90 minutes.
- 30 minutes of extra time if necessary.
- Penalty shoot-out if scores are still level.
- Seven named substitutes.
- Maximum of 3 substitutions.

== See also ==
- 2016–17 Ukrainian Premier League
