= 2007 Ukrainian Cup final =

- Event: 2006–07 Ukrainian Cup
Dynamo Kyiv	Shakhtar Donetsk
2	1
- Date: 27 May 2007
- Venue: NSC Olimpiyskiy, Kyiv
- Attendance: 64,500
- Weather: 25°C

The 2007 Ukrainian Cup final was a football match that took place at the Olympic NSC on 27 May 2007. The match was the 16th Ukrainian Cup Final and it was contested by Shakhtar Donetsk and Dynamo Kyiv. The Olympic stadium is the traditional arena for the Cup final.

== Road to Kyiv ==
All 16 Ukrainian Premier League clubs do not have to go through qualification to get into the competition, so Dynamo and Shakhtar both qualified for the competition automatically.

Dynamo Kyiv

Round 1	Olkom Melitopol	0–4	Dynamo Kyiv
Round 2	Kharkiv	0–2	Dynamo Kyiv
Quarter-final (1st leg)	Dynamo Kyiv	1–1	Dnipro Dnipropetrovsk
Quarter-final (2nd leg)	Dnipro Dnipropetrovsk	1–2 aet	Dynamo Kyiv
	(Dynamo won 3–2 on aggregate)		
Semi-final (1st leg)	Metalist Kharkiv	0–1	Dynamo Kyiv
Semi-final (2nd leg)	Dynamo Kyiv	4–2	Metalist Kharkiv
	(Dynamo won 5–2 on aggregate)		

Shakhtar Donetsk

Round 1	Yavir Krasnopillia	1–6	Shakhtar Donetsk
Round 2	Borysfen Boryspil	0–2	Shakhtar Donetsk
Quarter-final (1st leg)	Sevastopol	0–1	Shakhtar Donetsk
Quarter-final (2nd leg)	Shakhtar Donetsk	6–1	Sevastopol
	(Shakhtar won 7–1 on aggregate)		
Semi-final (1st leg)	Shakhtar Donetsk	0–0	Tavriya Simferopol
Semi-final (2nd leg)	Tavriya Simferopol	2–2	Shakhtar Donetsk
	(Shakhtar won 2–2 on away goal)		

== Previous encounters ==
Prior to the 2007 Cup Final, Dynamo and Shakhtar had met three times in previous Ukrainian Cup finals. Dynamo had defeated Shakhtar two times, since losing their very first meeting. In both of those meetings Dynamo was victorious 2–1. Shakhtar's best performance against Dynamo was back in the 2002 final, when the Miners were able to down the legendary Dynamo team in extra time 3–2. It was the first meeting between the team managers in this competition.

== Match details ==
2007-05-27
19:00 LST

Dynamo Kyiv	2 – 1	Shakhtar Donetsk
Kléber 58'; Husyev 80'	Report	Elano 89'

NSC Olimpiyskiy, Kyiv
Attendance: 64,500
Referee: Andriy Shandor (Lviv)

Dynamo Kyiv	Shakhtar Donetsk

Dynamo Kyiv:
GK	1	(Ukraine) Oleksandr Shovkovskyi
MF	4	(Romania) Tiberiu Ghioane
MF	7	(Brazil) Corrêa	(yellow card) 67'	(substituted off) 74'
FW	9	(Brazil) Kléber	(yellow card) 52'	(substituted off) 84'
MF	15	(Brazil) Diogo Rincón	(substituted off) 66'
DF	17	(Ukraine) Taras Mykhalyk
MF	20	(Ukraine) Oleh Husyev
DF	26	(Ukraine) Andriy Nesmachny
DF	27	(Ukraine) Vladyslav Vashchuk (c)
MF	36	(Serbia) Miloš Ninković
DF	44	(Brazil) Rodrigo	(yellow card) 27' (yellow-red card) 71'
Substitutes:
GK	21	(Ukraine) Taras Lutsenko
FW	11	(Senegal) Demba Touré
MF	14	(Ukraine) Ruslan Rotan
DF	81	(Serbia) Marjan Marković
FW	16	(Uzbekistan) Maksim Shatskikh	(substituted in) 84'
DF	29	(Ukraine) Vitaliy Mandziuk	(substituted in) 74'
MF	8	(Belarus) Valyantsin Byalkevich	(substituted in) 66'
Manager:
(Ukraine) Anatoliy Demyanenko

Shaktar Donetsk:
GK	1	(Ukraine) Bohdan Shust
DF	33	(Croatia) Darijo Srna	(yellow card) 86'
DF	27	(Ukraine) Dmytro Chyhrynskyi (c)	(yellow card) 41'
MF	26	(Romania) Răzvan Raț	(yellow card) 50'	(substituted off) 52'
DF	18	(Poland) Mariusz Lewandowski
MF	4	(Serbia) Igor Duljaj
MF	7	(Brazil) Fernandinho
FW	11	(Ukraine) Andriy Vorobey	(substituted off) 53'
DF	3	(Czech Republic) Tomáš Hübschman	(yellow card) 53'
MF	8	(Brazil) Jádson	(substituted off) 51'
FW	25	(Brazil) Brandão	(yellow card) 56'
Substitutes:
GK	12	(Ukraine) Dmytro Shutkov
MF	19	(Ukraine) Oleksiy Hai	(substituted in) 52'	(yellow card) 90+2'
DF	5	(Ukraine) Oleksandr Kucher
FW	29	(Romania) Ciprian Marica	(substituted in) 53'
MF	36	(Brazil) Elano	(substituted in) 51'
FW	20	(Ukraine) Oleksiy Byelik
MF	28	(Ukraine) Oleksiy Poliansky
Manager:
(Romania) Mircea Lucescu

MATCH OFFICIALS

- Assistant referees:
  - Andriy Valenko (Lviv)
  - Eduard Valenko (Lviv)
- Fourth official: Yuriy Moseychuk (Chernivtsi)

MATCH RULES

- 90 minutes.
- 30 minutes of extra-time if necessary.
- Penalty shoot-out if scores still level.
- Seven named substitutes
- Maximum of 3 substitutions.

Ukrainian Cup 2007 Winners

Dynamo Kyiv
Ninth title

== See also ==
- 2006–07 Ukrainian Cup
- 2006–07 Ukrainian Premier League
