= 1998–99 Ukrainian Cup =

1998—99 Ukrainian Cup
Kubok Ukrainy

Tournament details
- Country: Ukraine
- Dates: 1 August 1998 – 30 May 1999
- Teams: 63

Final positions
- Champions: Dynamo Kyiv (4th title)
- Runners-up: Karpaty Lviv

Tournament statistics
- Top goal scorer: Artem Lopatkin (8)

The 1998–99 Ukrainian Cup was the eighth annual season of Ukraine's football knockout competition, also known as Kubok of Ukraine.

The Cup began with a Preliminary Round.

The winners of this competition entered as Ukraine's Cup Winner representative in the UEFA Cup for 1999–2000 season.

== Competition schedule ==
=== Preliminary round ===
There was a single game between two Ternopil Oblast teams on August 1, 1998.

| Krystal Chortkiv | 3 – 1 | Zoria Khorostkiv |

=== First Qualification Round ===
The first games took place on August 25 and the second – August 29.

| Team 1 | Agg. | Team 2 | 1st leg | 2nd leg |
|---|---|---|---|---|
| FC Portovyk Illichivsk | 1–7 | SC Odesa | 1–3 | 0–4 |
| FC Krystal Kherson | 4–1 | FC Dynamo-SKA Odesa | 3–1 | 1–0 |
| FC Metalurh Novomoskovsk | 8–2 | FC Viktor Zaporizhzhia | 4–0 | 4–2 |
| FC Bukovyna Chernivtsi | 2–3 | FC Tsementnyk–Khorda Mykolaiv | 1–2 | 1–1 |
| FC Krystal Chortkiv | 4–6 | FC Verkhovyna Uzhhorod | 4–1 | 0–5 |
| FC Chornomorets Sevastopol | 1–2 | FC Tytan Armyansk | 0–1 | 1–1 |
| FC Olimpia Yuzhnoukrainsk | 5–1 | FC Lokomotyv Smila | 3–1 | 2–0 |
| FC Dynamo-3 Kyiv | 0–5 | FC Systema-Boreks Borodianka | 0–4 | 0–1 |
| FC Hirnyk-Sport Komsomolsk | 1–5 | FC Obolon-PPO Kyiv | 0–2 | 1–3 |
| FC Veres Rivne | 5–2 | FC Hazovyk Komarno | 0–2 | 0–3 |
| FC Naftovyk Dolyna | 1–2 | FC Paperovyk Malyn | 0–0 | 1–2 |
| FC Shakhtar Stakhanov | 5–2 | FC Avanhard Rovenky | 4–0 | 1–2 |
| FC Oskil Kupyansk | 0–2 | FC Zorya Luhansk | 0–0 | 0–2 |
| FC Elektron Romny | 6–2 | FC Myrhorod | 4–1 | 2–1 |
| FC Halychyna Drohobych | 1–3 | FC Podillya Khmelnytskyi | 1–2 | 0–1 |

=== Second Qualification Round ===
| Team 1 | Agg. | Team 2 | 1st leg | 2nd leg |
|---|---|---|---|---|
| FC Chornomorets Odesa | 2–4 | SC Odesa | 1–1 | 1–3 |
| FC Metalurh Nikopol | 6–4 | FC Krystal Kherson | 4–1 | 2–3 |
| FC Polihraftekhnika Oleksandriya | 2–3 | FC Metalurh Novomoskovsk | 1–0 | 1–3 (a.e.t.) |
| FC Tsementnyk–Khorda Mykolaiv | (a) 2–2 | FC Nyva Vinnytsia | 0–0 | 2–2 |
| FC Verkhovyna Uzhhorod | 2–3 | FC Lviv | 1–0 | 1–3 |
| FC Tytan Armyansk | 1–3 | FC Torpedo Zaporizhzhia | 1–1 | 0–2 |
| FC Olimpia Yuzhnoukrainsk | w/o | FC Kremin Kremenchuk | 0–1 | –:+ |
| FC Cherkasy | 3–0 | FC Systema-Boreks Borodianka | 3–0 | 0–0 |
| FC Yavir Krasnopillia | 4–2 | FC Obolon-PPO Kyiv | 2–1 | 2–1 |
| FC Hazovyk Komarno | 5–2 | FC Dynamo-2 Kyiv | 3–2 | 2–0 |
| FC Polissya Zhytomyr | 1–2 | FC Paperovyk Malyn | 1–1 | 0–1 |
| FC Shakhtar Stakhanov | 2–7 | FC Stal Alchevsk | 2–6 | 0–1 |
| FC Shakhtar Makiivka | 2–3 | FC Zorya Luhansk | 1–2 | 1–1 |
| FC Elektron Romny | 2–4 | FC Naftovyk Okhtyrka | 2–2 | 0–2 |
| FC Podillya Khmelnytskyi | 2–3 | FC Volyn Lutsk | 1–0 | 1–3 |

=== Third Qualification Round ===
| Team 1 | Agg. | Team 2 | 1st leg | 2nd leg |
|---|---|---|---|---|
| SC Odesa | 6–3 | FC Metalurh Novomoskovsk | 2–0 | 4–3 |
| FC Lviv | 7–3 | FC Tsementnyk–Khorda Mykolaiv | 5–0 | 2–3 |
| FC Torpedo Zaporizhzhia | 0–2 | FC Kremin Kremenchuk | 0–2 | 0–0 |
| FC Yavir Krasnopillia | 1–3 | FC Cherkasy | 0–0 | 1–3 |
| FC Hazovyk Komarno | 2–5 | FC Desna Chernihiv | 2–0 | 0–5 (a.e.t.) |
| FC Metalurh Nikopol | 1–0 | FC Paperovyk Malyn | 1–0 | 0–0 |
| FC Zorya–MALS Luhansk | 0–7 | FC Stal Alchevsk | 0–0 | 0–7 |
| FC Naftovyk Okhtyrka | 5–5 (a) | FC Volyn Lutsk | 5–4 | 0–1 |

=== Fourth Qualification Round ===
| Team 1 | Agg. | Team 2 | 1st leg | 2nd leg |
|---|---|---|---|---|
| FC Metalurh Zaporizhzhia | 4–5 | SC Odesa | 3–2 | 1–3 |
| FC Lviv | w/o | FC Metalist Kharkiv | 2–1 | –:+ |
| FC Zirka Kirovohrad | 8–1 | FC Kremin Kremenchuk | 5–1 | 3–0 |
| FC Cherkasy | 3–4 | SC Tavriya Simferopol | 1–1 | 2–3 |
| FC Desna Chernihiv | 1–2 | FC Prykarpattia Ivano-Frankivsk | 1–1 | 0–1 |
| FC Metalurh Nikopol | 2–3 | SC Mykolaiv | 1–1 | 1–2 |
| FC Metalurh Mariupol | 5–3 | FC Stal Alchevsk | 2–0 | 3–3 |
| FC CSKA Kyiv | (a) 2–2 | FC Volyn Lutsk | 0–0 | 2–2 |

=== First round ===
| Team 1 | Agg. | Team 2 | 1st leg | 2nd leg |
|---|---|---|---|---|
| SC Odesa | 2–8 | FC Dynamo Kyiv | 2–4 | 0–4 |
| FC Metalurh Donetsk | 2–4 | FC Metalist Kharkiv | 0–1 | 2–3 |
| FC Zirka Kirovohrad | 1–0 | FC Dnipro Dnipropetrovsk | 0–0 | 1–0 |
| FC Nyva Ternopil | 0–4 | SC Tavriya Simferopol | 0–2 | 0–2 |
| FC Shakhtar Donetsk | 7–4 | FC Prykarpattia Ivano-Frankivsk | 4–0 | 3–4 |
| SC Mykolaiv | 1–5 | FC Kryvbas Kryvyi Rih | 0–2 | 1–3 |
| FC Karpaty Lviv | 4–3 | FC Metalurh Mariupol | 2–0 | 2–3 |
| FC CSKA Kyiv | 0–1 | FC Vorskla Poltava | 0–0 | 0–1 |

=== Quarterfinals ===
| Team 1 | Agg. | Team 2 | 1st leg | 2nd leg |
|---|---|---|---|---|
| FC Metalist Kharkiv | 1–5 | FC Dynamo Kyiv | 1–2 | 0–3 |
| FC Shakhtar Donetsk | 2–1 | FC Kryvbas Kryvyi Rih | 2–1 | 0–0 |
| FC Vorskla Poltava | 2–6 | FC Karpaty Lviv | 2–3 | 0–3 |
| SC Tavriya Simferopol | 2–2 (a) | FC Zirka Kirovohrad | 2–1 | 0–1 |

=== Semifinals ===
| Team 1 | Agg. | Team 2 | 1st leg | 2nd leg |
|---|---|---|---|---|
| FC Zirka Kirovohrad | 1–6 | FC Dynamo Kyiv | 1–5 | 0–1 |
| FC Karpaty Lviv | (a) 2–2 | FC Shakhtar Donetsk | 1–0 | 1–2 (a.e.t.) |

==== First leg ====
| 28 April 1999 | Zirka Kirovohrad (PL) | 1–5 | (PL) Dynamo Kyiv | Nika Stadium, Oleksandriya |
| | Husyev 57' | Report | Rebrov 23', 40'; Shevchenko 26'; Khatskevich 67', 85' | Attendance: 5,500; Referee: Vasyl Melnychuk |

| 28 April 1999 | Karpaty Lviv (PL) | 1–0 | (PL) Shakhtar Donetsk | Ukraina Stadium, Lviv |
| | Palianytsia 67' (pen.) | Report | | Attendance: 18,000; Referee: Serhiy Tatulyan |

==== Second leg ====
| 6 May 1999 | Dynamo Kyiv (PL) | 1–0 | (PL) Zirka Kirovohrad | Dynamo Stadium, Kyiv |
| | Kormiltsev 85' | Report | | Attendance: 12,000; Referee: Valeriy Onufer |

| 6 May 1999 | Shakhtar Donetsk (PL) | 2–1 (a.e.t.) | (PL) Karpaty Lviv | Shakhtar Stadium, Donetsk |
| | Matveyev 54', 101' (pen.) | Report | Mizin 111' | Attendance: 20,000; Referee: Ihor Khiblin |

=== Final ===
The final was held at the NSC Olimpiysky on May 30, 1999, in Kyiv.

30 May 1999
17:00 LST

| Dynamo Kyiv | 3–0 | Karpaty Lviv |
|---|---|---|
| Andriy Shevchenko 18', 67'; Valiatsin Bialkevich 19' | Report |

NSC Olimpiyskiy, Kyiv
Attendance: 71,000
Referee: Vasyl Melnychuk (Simferopol)

== Top goalscorers ==
| Scorer | Goals | Team |

== See also ==
- 1998–99 Ukrainian Second League
- 1998–99 Ukrainian First League
- 1998–99 UEFA Cup
