= Oleksandr Chyzhevskyi =

Ukrainian footballer (born 1971)

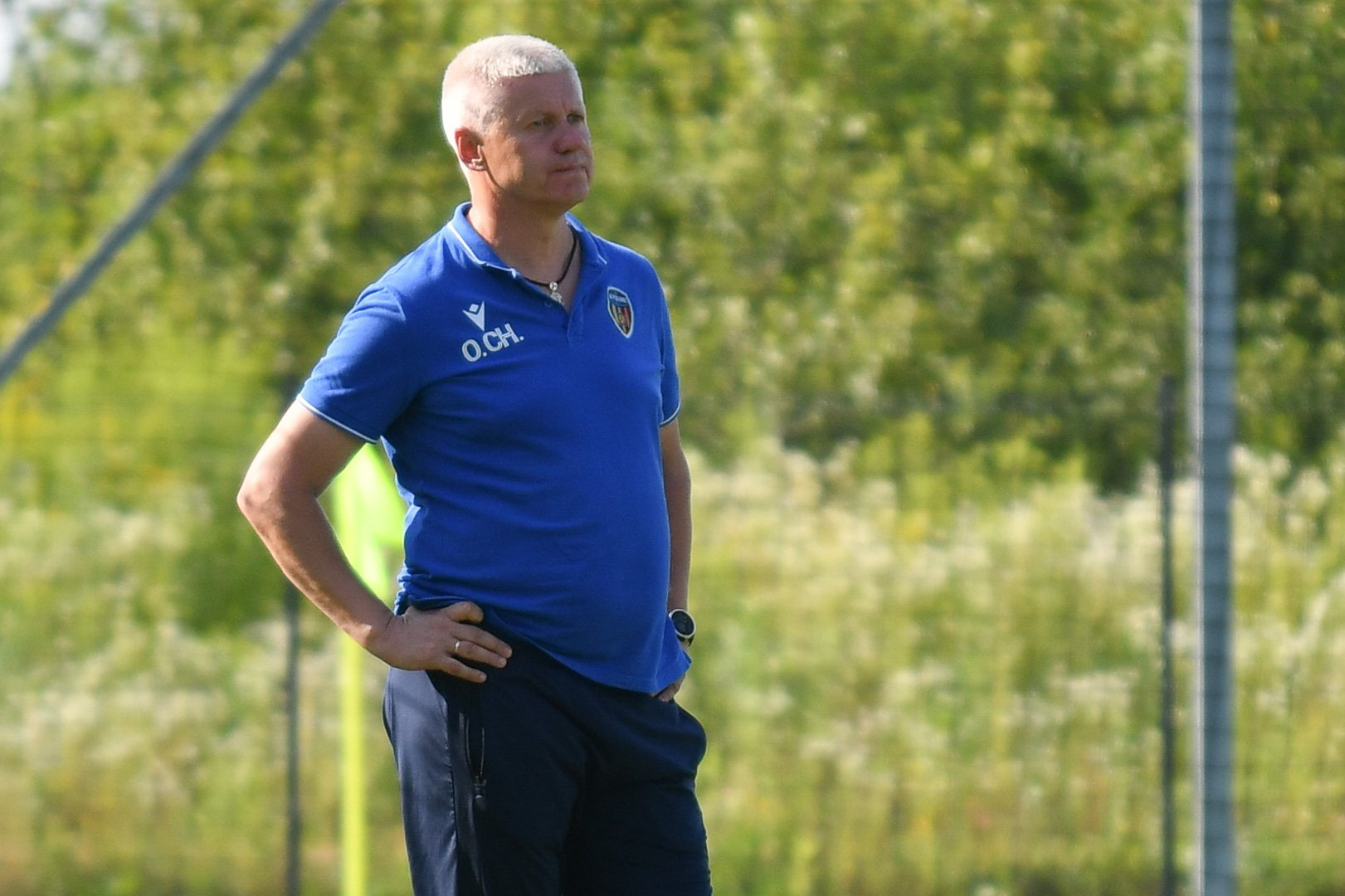

Personal information
- Full name: Oleksandr Arseniyovych Chyzhevskyi
- Date of birth: 27 May 1971 (age 55)
- Place of birth: Lutsk, Ukrainian SSR
- Height: 1.77 m (5 ft 10 in)
- Position: Defender

Team information
- Current team: Ahrobiznes Volochysk (manager)

Senior career*
Years	Team	Apps	(Gls)
1990–1999	Karpaty Lviv	245	(4)
1998	→ Karpaty-2 Lviv	4	(1)
1999	→ FC Lviv (loan)	3	(0)
1999	Shakhtar Donetsk	9	(0)
1999	→ Shakhtar-2 Donetsk	3	(0)
2000–2001	Metalurh Zaporizhzhia	38	(0)
2000–2001	→ Metalurh-2 Zaporizhzhia	7	(0)
2000	→ SSSOR-Metalurh Zaporizhzhia (loan)	1	(0)
2002	Tavriya Simferopol	10	(0)
2002	Karpaty Lviv	14	(0)
2003	Volyn Lutsk	1	(0)
2004–2006	Tavriya Simferopol	77	(0)
2006–2010	Zakarpattia Uzhhorod	101	(0)
Total		513	(5)

International career
1998	Ukraine	1	(0)

Managerial career
- 2010–2011: Zakarpattia Uzhhorod (youth)
- 2014–2015: Karpaty Lviv (youth)
- 2016–2019: Karpaty Lviv (U21)
- 2019: Karpaty Lviv
- 2019–: Ahrobiznes Volochysk
- * Club domestic league appearances and goals

Oleksandr Chyzhevskyi (Ukrainian: Олександр Арсенійович Чижевський; born 27 May 1971) is a Ukrainian football coach and a former player who coaches Ahrobiznes Volochysk. He is on the fourth place the all-time appearance leader in the Vyscha Liha.

== Playing career ==
On 12 December 2009, Chyzhevskyi played his 400th game in the Ukrainian Premier League in an away game of Zakarpattia Uzhhorod against Vorskla Poltava. He became the first player to reach 300 mark for games played in the league.

Chyzhevskyi made his debut for Ukraine on 15 July 1998 in a home loss to Poland (2–1 loss). He was replaced during half-time break by Vladyslav Vashchuk.

== Honours ==
- Ukrainian Cup runner-up: 1993, 1999
- Soviet Second League: 1991
