= Valyantsin Byalkevich =

Belarusian footballer (1973–2014)

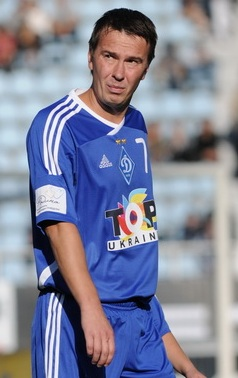
- Byalkevich in 2011

Personal information
- Full name: Valyantsin Mihaylavich Byalkevich
- Date of birth: 27 January 1973
- Place of birth: Minsk, Soviet Union
- Date of death: 1 August 2014 (aged 41)
- Place of death: Kyiv, Ukraine
- Height: 1.81 m (5 ft 11 in)
- Position: Midfielder

Senior career*
Years	Team	Apps	(Gls)
1991–1996	Dinamo Minsk	86	(39)
1996–2008	Dynamo Kyiv	222	(51)
1996–2001	→ Dynamo-2 Kyiv	39	(8)
1997–1998	→ Dynamo-3 Kyiv	3	(1)
2008–2009	Inter Baku	5	(0)
Total		313	(90)

International career
1994–1995	Belarus U21	2	(0)
1992–2005	Belarus	56	(10)

Managerial career
- 2010–2013: Dynamo Kyiv Reserves (assistant)
- 2012–2013: Dynamo Kyiv Youth
- 2013–2014: Dynamo Kyiv Reserves
- * Club domestic league appearances and goals

Valyantsin Byalkevich (Belarusian: Валянцін Бялькевіч; 27 January 1973 – 1 August 2014), also referred to as Valiantsin Bialkevich, was a Belarusian professional footballer who played as a midfielder for the Belarus national team. He spent the majority of his career with Ukrainian club Dynamo Kyiv, where he was predominantly used as a playmaker, and was part of the team that reached the semi-finals of 1998–99 UEFA Champions League.

== Club career ==
In September 1994 while playing for Dinamo Minsk, Byalkevich was banned from European competitions for one year by UEFA after testing positive for anabolic steroids following a UEFA Cup match.

== International career ==
In October 2005, Byalkevich retired from the Belarus national team, having scored 10 goals, while being capped 56 times.

== Personal life and death ==
Byalkevich married Ukrainian pop singer Anna Sedokova in 2004. They had a daughter on 8 December 2004 and divorced in 2006. In 2008, he accepted Ukrainian citizenship and continued to work in the Dynamo Kyiv football academy.

Byalkevich died on 1 August 2014, after suffering an aneurysm.

== Career statistics ==
Scores and results list Belarusia's goal tally first, score column indicates score after each Byalkevich goal.

List of international goals scored by Valyantsin Byalkevich
No.	Date	Venue	Opponent	Score	Result	Competition
1	25 May 1994	Olimpiyskyi National Sports Complex, Kyiv, Ukraine	Ukraine	1–0	1–3	Friendly
2	14 February 1996	İzmir Atatürk Stadium, İzmir, Turkey	Turkey	1–0	2–3	Friendly
3	1 June 1996	Råsunda Stadium, Metropolitan Stockholm, Sweden	Sweden	1–3	1–5	1998 FIFA World Cup qualification
4	14 October 1998	Ninian Park, Cardiff, Wales	Wales	2–1	2–3	UEFA Euro 2000 qualifying
5	31 March 1999	Stadio del Conero, Ancona, Italy	Italy	1–0	1–1	UEFA Euro 2000 qualifying
6	2 September 2000	Dinamo Stadium, Minsk, Belarus	Wales	2–0	2–1	2002 FIFA World Cup qualification
7	6 June 2001	Ullevaal Stadion, Oslo, Norway	Norway	1–0	1–1	2002 FIFA World Cup qualification
8	17 May 2002	Central Dynamo Stadium, Moscow, Russia	Russia	1–0	1–1	LG Cup
9	19 May 2002	Central Dynamo Stadium, Moscow, Russia	Ukraine	1–0	2–0	LG Cup
10	4 June 2005	Dinamo Stadium, Minsk, Belarus	Slovenia	1–1	1–1	2006 FIFA World Cup qualification

== Honors ==
Dinamo Minsk

- Belarusian Premier League: 1992, 1992–93, 1993–94, 1994–95, 1995
- Belarusian Cup: 1992, 1993–94

Dynamo Kyiv

- Ukrainian Premier League (9): 1995–96, 1996–97, 1997–98, 1998–99, 1999–2000, 2000–01, 2002–03, 2003–04, 2006–07
- Ukrainian Cup (8): 1996, 1998, 1999, 2000, 2003, 2005, 2006, 2007
- Ukrainian Super Cup: 2004, 2006

Individual

- Belarusian Footballer of the Year: 1995
- Komanda: 2001, 2003
- ADN Eastern European Footballer of the Season: 2002
