= Vitaliy Reva =

Ukrainian footballer

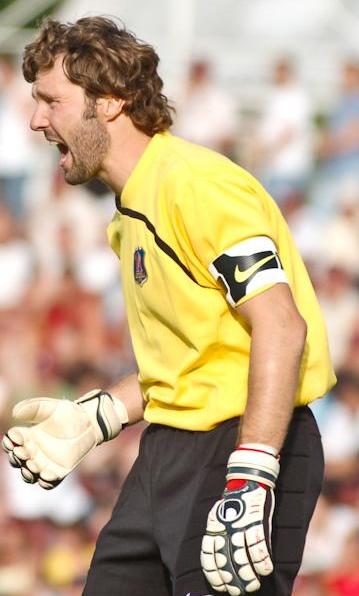

Personal information
- Full name: Vitaliy Hryhorovych Reva
- Date of birth: 19 November 1974 (age 51)
- Place of birth: Dnipropetrovsk, Ukrainian SSR (now Ukraine)
- Height: 1.83 m (6 ft 0 in)
- Position: Goalkeeper

Team information
- Current team: Ukraine U21 (goalkeeping coach)

Youth career
- –1991: Dnipro-75 Dnipropetrovsk

Senior career*
Years	Team	Apps	(Gls)
1991–1992	Dnipro Dnipropetrovsk	0	(0)
1992–1995	Polihraftekhnika Oleksandriya	88	(0)
1995–2001	CSKA Kyiv	127	(0)
1995–2001	→ CSKA-2 Kyiv (loan)	12	(0)
2001–2005	Dynamo Kyiv	50	(0)
2001–2007	→ Dynamo-2 Kyiv	36	(0)
2005–2006	→ Dynamo-3 Kyiv	2	(0)
2005–2006	→ Tavriya Simferopol (loan)	13	(0)
2007–2011	Arsenal Kyiv	89	(0)
2011–2012	Obolon Kyiv	10	(0)
2012–2013	Kryvbas Kryvyi Rih	6	(0)
2013	Arsenal Kyiv	14	(0)
2021	Livyi Bereh Kyiv	10	(0)

International career^{‡}
2001–2003	Ukraine	9	(0)

Managerial career
- 2019–: Ukraine U21 (goalkeeping coach)
- 2023: Ukraine (goalkeeping coach)
- * Club domestic league appearances and goals as of 9 October 2021 ‡ National team caps and goals as of 24 July 2009

Vitaliy Hryhorovych Reva (Ukrainian: Віталій Григорович Рева; born 19 November 1974) is a Ukrainian former professional football player. He is also the goalkeeping coach of Ukraine national under-21 football team. Born in Dnipropetrovsk, Ukraine, Reva is a former Dynamo Kyiv and Ukraine national football team goalkeeper.

== Club career ==
=== Polihraftekhnika Oleksandriya ===
Born in Dnipropetrovsk, Reva started his professional career at Polihraftekhnika Oleksandriya in 1993–1995 in the Ukrainian First League.

=== CSKA Kyiv ===
He then moved to CSKA-Borysfen Kyiv (later FC CSKA Kyiv), where he debuted in the Vyshcha Liha and played 6 seasons until 2001.

=== Dynamo Kyiv ===
In 2001, he moved to Dynamo Kyiv where he played until 2005.

==== Loan to Tavriya Simferopol ====
During the 2005–06 season, Reva was loaned to Tavriya Simferopol until the end of 2005.

=== Livyi Bereh Kyiv ===
At 46 in 2021, Reva appeared listed for the Ukrainian Second League club Livyi Bereh Kyiv.

== Honours ==
=== Dynamo Kyiv ===
- Ukrainian Premier League: 2002–03, 2003–04
- Ukrainian Cup: 2002–03, 2004–05

== Personal life ==
Reva is the son of former Ukrainian Minister of Emergencies from 2004 to 2005 Hryhoriy Reva.
