= 2004–05 Ukrainian Cup =

2004—05 Ukrainian Cup
Kubok Ukrainy

Tournament details
- Country: Ukraine
- Dates: 6 August 2004 – 29 May 2005
- Teams: 64

Final positions
- Champions: Dynamo Kyiv (7th title)
- Runners-up: Shakhtar Donetsk

Tournament statistics
- Matches played: 69
- Goals scored: 210 (3.04 per match)

The 2004–05 Ukrainian Cup was the 14th annual edition of Ukraine's football knockout competition, known as the Ukrainian Cup. The first game was conducted on August 4, 2004 with the game between Rava and Shakhtar Donetsk in Rava-Ruska, Lviv Region. The final took place in late May of the next year where the same Shakhtar yielded to Dynamo Kyiv at the Olympic Stadium 0:1.

It was the last season of the format that did not involve any qualification and preliminary rounds. Every club started from the Round of 64 (1/32 of final) regardless of their position in the league's system structure. However the lower division clubs were given a home-field advantage.

== Round and draw dates ==
All draws held at FFU headquarters (Building of Football) in Kyiv unless stated otherwise.

| Round | Draw date | Game date | |
| Round | Draw date | First leg | Second leg |
|---|---|---|---|
| Round of 64 | ? | 6–8, 14–15 August 2004 | |
| Round of 32 | ? | 19–22 August 2004 | |
| Round of 16 | ? | 11–12 September 2004 | |
| Quarter-finals | ? | 16–17 October 2004 | 19–20 November 2004 |
| Semi-finals | ? | 21 April 2005 | 4 May 2005 |
| Final | 29 May 2005 at NSC "Olimpiyskiy", Kyiv | | |

== Competition Schedule ==
=== Round of 64 ===
The round of 64 took place in the first half of August 2004. Officially, games took place on August 7 unless otherwise indicated.

| FC Rava Rava-Ruska | 1:4 | FC Shakhtar Donetsk | August 4 |
| SC Olkom Melitopol | 0:4 | FC Dynamo Kyiv | August 6 |
| FC Dniester Ovidiopol | 0:1 | FC Metalurh Donetsk | (a.e.t.) |
| FC Ros Bila Tserkva | 0:1 | FC Obolon Kyiv |
| FC Bukovyna Chernivtsi | 0:1 | FC Borysfen Boryspil |
| PFC Olexandria | 0:2 | FC Arsenal Kyiv |
| FC Zirka Kirovohrad | 1:4 | FC Kryvbas Kryvyi Rih |
| FC Hazovyk Kharkiv | 1:4 | FC Metalurh Zaporizhzhia | Game in Krasnokutsk |
| FC Helios Kharkiv | 1:3 | SC Tavriya Simferopol | Game on "Arsenal-Spartak Stadium" in Kharkiv |
| FC Krystal Kherson | 0:1 | FC Vorskla Poltava |
| FC Yavir Krasnopillya | 3:1 | FC Zakarpattia Uzhhorod |
| FC Nyva Ternopil | 0:1 | FC Metalist Kharkiv |
| FC Osvita Borodyanka | 1:2 | FC Karpaty Lviv |
| PFC Sevastopol | 0:2 | FC Naftovyk Okhtyrka |
| FC Palmira Odesa | 1:1 | FC Stal Alchevsk | (pk: 3:4), "Spartak Stadium" in Odesa |
| FC Enerhetyk Burshtyn | 1:3 | FC Spartak Ivano-Frankivsk |
| FC Desna Chernihiv | 4:0 | FC Arsenal Kharkiv |
| FC Krymteplytsia Molodizhne | 0:3 | FC Nyva Vinnytsia |
| FC Real Odesa | 0:2 | FC CSKA Kyiv | (a.e.t.), "SKA Stadium" in Odesa |
| FC Naftovyk Dolyna | 1:2 | MFK Mykolaiv |
| FC Veres Rivne | 2:4 | FC Podillya Khmelnytsky |
| FC Vuhlyk Dymytrov | 0:3 | FC Nafkom Brovary | "Ukraina Stadium" in Dymytrov |
| FC Tytan Armyansk | 1:4 | FC Zorya Luhansk |
| FC Tekhno-Tsentr Rohatyn | 1:0 | FC Polissya Zhytomyr |
| FC Hirnyk-Sport Komsomolsk | 1:3 | FC Dynamo Simferopol | "Politekhnik Stadium" (Kremenchuk?) |
| FC Cherkasy | 2:0 | FC Hazovyk-Skala Stryi |
| FC Bershad | 1:3 | FC Stal Dniprodzerzhynsk | Kolos Stadium in Bershad |
| MFC Olexandria | 0:3 | FC Spartak Sumy | August 8 (On August 7 played PFC Olexandria) |
| FC Fakel Ivano-Frankivsk | 0:7 | FC Chornomorets Odesa | August 14 at "Naftovyk Stadium" (University) in Ivano-Frankivsk |
| FC Olimpia Yuzhnoukrainsk | 0:4 | FC Volyn Lutsk | August 14 |
| FC Elektrometalurh Nikopol | 1:4 | FC Dnipro Dnipropetrovsk | August 15 |
| FC Chornohora Ivano-Frankivsk | 1:5 | FC Illichivets Mariupol | August 15 at "Nauka Stadium" (former Elektron) in Ivano-Frankivsk |

=== Round of 32 ===
The round of 32 took place from August 19 through August 22, 2004, with most games taking place on August 22. Unless otherwise indicated, games are presumed to take place on August 22.

| FC Desna Chernihiv | 2:1 | FC Borysfen Boryspil | (a.e.t.) August 19 |
| FC Nyva Vinnytsia | 2:2 | FC Arsenal Kyiv | (pk: 4:2) August 19 |
| FC Yavir Krasnopillya | 0:6 | FC Dynamo Kyiv | "Jubilee Stadium" in Sumy, August 20 |
| FC Spartak Sumy | 1:3 | FC Shakhtar Donetsk | "Jubilee Stadium" in Sumy, August 21 |
| FC Stal Dniprodzerzhynsk | 2:3 | FC Metalurh Donetsk | August 21 |
| FC Dynamo Simferopol | 0:3 | FC Dnipro Dnipropetrovsk | "Krymteplytsia Stadium" in Molodizhne, August 21 |
| FC Podillya Khmelnytsky | 0:3 | FC Illichivets Mariupol | August 21 |
| FC Naftovyk Okhtyrka | 4:0 | FC Vorskla Poltava | August 21 |
| FC Cherkasy | 3:2 | FC Chornomorets Odesa | (a.e.t.) |
| FC CSKA Kyiv | 2:2 | FC Obolon Kyiv | (pk: 6:5) "CSKA Stadium" in Kyiv |
| FC Zorya Luhansk | 0:1 | FC Kryvbas Kryvyi Rih | (a.e.t.) |
| MFK Mykolaiv | 0:1 | FC Metalurh Zaporizhzhia |
| FC Nafkom Brovary | 1:2 | SC Tavriya Simferopol | (a.e.t.) |
| FC Spartak Ivano-Frankivsk | 0:3 | FC Volyn Lutsk | "Khimik Stadium" in Kalush |
| FC Stal Alchevsk | 2:0 | FC Metalist Kharkiv |
| FC Tekhno-Tsentr Rohatyn | 0:2 | FC Karpaty Lviv |

=== Round of 16 (1/8) ===
The round of 16 matches consisted of eight match-ups out of which four took place on September 11, while the other four took place on September 12, 2004.

| FC Karpaty Lviv | 0:1 | FC Dynamo Kyiv |
| FC CSKA Kyiv | 1:2 | FC Shakhtar Donetsk |
| FC Stal Alchevsk | 1:2 | FC Dnipro Dnipropetrovsk |
| FC Naftovyk Okhtyrka | 2:1 | FC Metalurh Donetsk | "Jubilee Stadium" in Sumy |
| FC Illichivets Mariupol | 1:2 | FC Volyn Lutsk | (a.e.t.) |
| FC Desna Chernihiv | 1:4 | FC Kryvbas Kryvyi Rih |
| FC Nyva Vinnytsia | 1:0 | FC Metalurh Zaporizhzhia |
| FC Cherkasy | 1:1 | SC Tavriya Simferopol | (pk: 4:5) |

=== Quarterfinals ===
The first leg was scheduled to take place on October 16, while the second leg – on November 20, 2004.

| Team 1 | Agg. | Team 2 | 1st leg | 2nd leg |
|---|---|---|---|---|
| FC Volyn Lutsk | 1–6 | FC Dynamo Kyiv | 1–2 | 0–4 |
| FC Shakhtar Donetsk | 7–0 | SC Tavriya Simferopol | 3–0 | 4–0 |
| FC Naftovyk Okhtyrka | 2–4 | FC Dnipro Dnipropetrovsk | 0–2 | 2–2 |
| FC Nyva Vinnytsia | 2–3 | FC Kryvbas Kryvyi Rih | 2–1 | 0–2 |

=== Semifinals ===
The semifinals took place on April 21 and May 4, 2005.

| Team 1 | Agg. | Team 2 | 1st leg | 2nd leg |
|---|---|---|---|---|
| FC Shakhtar Donetsk | 2–1 | FC Dnipro Dnipropetrovsk | 2–1 | 0–0 |
| FC Kryvbas Kryvyi Rih | 1–3 | FC Dynamo Kyiv | 1–1 | 0–2 |

=== Final ===
29 May 2004
17:00 LST

| Dynamo Kyiv (PL) | 1–0 | (PL) Shakhtar Donetsk |
|---|---|---|
| Diogo Rincón 11' (pen.) | Report | Marica (red card) 29' |

NSC Olimpiyskiy, Kyiv
Attendance: 68,000
Referee: Terje Hauge
