= 2003–04 Ukrainian Cup =

2003—04 Ukrainian Cup
Kubok Ukrainy

Tournament details
- Country: Ukraine
- Dates: 8 August 2003 – 30 May 2004
- Teams: 64

Final positions
- Champions: Shakhtar Donetsk (5th title)
- Runners-up: Dnipro Dnipropetrovsk

The 2003–04 Ukrainian Cup was the 13th annual edition of Ukraine's football knockout competition, known as the Ukrainian Cup. Shakhtar Donetsk won the title, defeating FC Dnipro Dnipropetrovsk in the final.

== Round and draw dates ==
All draws held at FFU headquarters (Building of Football) in Kyiv unless stated otherwise.

Round	Draw date	Game date	
Round	Draw date	First leg	Second leg
Round of 64	?	8–10 August 2003	
Round of 32	?	23–24 August 2003	
Round of 16	?	28–29 October 2003	
Quarter-finals	?	15–16 November 2003	19–21 November 2003
Semi-finals	?	7 March 2004	21 April 2004
Final	30 May 2004 at NSC "Olimpiyskiy", Kyiv		

== Competition Schedule ==
=== Round of 64 ===
FC Podillya Khmelnytskyi	1:3	FC Arsenal Kyiv
FC Naftovyk Dolyna	0:1	FC Obolon Kyiv
FC Veres Rivne	+:-	FC Enerhetyk Burshtyn
FC Ikva Mlyniv	1:3	FC Polissya Zhytomyr
FC Nyva Ternopil	0:4	FC Illichivets Mariupol
FC Hazovyk-Skala Stryi	1:0	FC Zirka Kirovohrad
FC Tekhno-Center Rohatyn	0:4	FC Volyn Lutsk
FC Bukovyna Chernivtsi	0:2	FC Nafkom-Akademiya Irpin
FC Chornohora Ivano-Frankivsk	0:1	MFK Mykolaiv
FC Rava Rava-Ruska	0:1	SC Tavriya Simferopol
FC Dynamo Simferopol	0:3	FC Nyva Vinnytsia
FC Elektrometalurh-NZF Nikopol	0:1	FC Zakarpattia Uzhhorod
SC Olkom Melitopol	1:5	FC Metalurh Donetsk
FC Dnister Ovidiopol	3:2	FC Systema-Boreks Borodyanka
FC Krystal Kherson	1:2	FC CSKA Kyiv
Olimpiya FC AES Uzhnoukrainsk	0:3	FC Chornomorets Odesa
PFC Sevastopol	3:4	FC Kryvbas Kryvyi Rih
FC Ros Bila Tserkva	2:2	FC Spartak Sumy	(pk: 2:4)
FC Tytan Armyansk	1:1	FC Karpaty Lviv	(pk: 4:1)
FC Hirnyk-Sport Komsomolsk	0:2	FC Metalurh Zaporizhzhia
FC Cherkasy	2:3	FC Naftovyk Okhtyrka
FC Vodnyk Mykolaiv	0:3	FC Vorskla Poltava
FC Krymteplytsia Molodizhne	0:1	FC Spartak Ivano-Frankivsk
FC Palmira Odesa	2:2	FC Arsenal Kharkiv	(pk: 4:2)
FC Desna Chernihiv	0:2	FC Dnipro Dnipropetrovsk
FC Stal Dniprodzerzhynsk	1:2	FC Zorya Luhansk
FC Avanhard Rovenky	0:4	FC Borysfen Boryspil
FC Yavir Krasnopillya	0:3	FC Shakhtar Donetsk
FC Elektron Romny	0:2	FC Krasyliv
FC Vuhlyk Dymytrov	0:7	FC Dynamo Kyiv
FC Helios Kharkiv	0:2	FC Metalist Kharkiv
FC Hazovyk Kharkiv	1:2	FC Stal Alchevsk

=== Round of 32 ===
FC Spartak Sumy	1:5	FC Vorskla Poltava
FC Nyva Vinnytsia	1:2	FC Chornomorets Odesa
FC Naftovyk Okhtyrka	1:2	FC Metalurh Zaporizhzhia	(a.e.t.)
FC Spartak Ivano-Frankivsk	5:3	FC Metalist Kharkiv
FC Nafkom-Akademiya Irpin	0:1	FC Dnipro Dnipropetrovsk
FC Zakarpattia Uzhhorod	0:1	FC Kryvbas Kryvyi Rih
FC Krasyliv	1:4	SC Tavriya Simferopol
FC Polissya Zhytomyr	2:3	FC Borysfen Boryspil	(a.e.t.)
FC CSKA Kyiv	0:2	FC Illichivets Mariupol
FC Zorya Luhansk	2:5	FC Obolon Kyiv
MFK Mykolaiv	0:6	FC Dynamo Kyiv
FC Tytan Armyansk	1:4	FC Volyn Lutsk
FC Veres Rivne	1:4	FC Metalurh Donetsk
FC Palmira Odesa	0:2	FC Shakhtar Donetsk
FC Hazovyk-Skala Stryi	1:4	FC Arsenal Kyiv
FC Dnister Ovidiopol	1:2	FC Stal Alchevsk

=== Round of 16 ===
FC Dnipro Dnipropetrovsk	3:0	FC Arsenal Kyiv
FC Metalurh Donetsk	1:1	SC Tavriya Simferopol	(pk: 8:9)
FC Illichivets Mariupol	5:0	FC Vorskla Poltava
FC Borysfen Boryspil	1:2	FC Metalurh Zaporizhzhia
FC Kryvbas Kryvyi Rih	0:4	FC Shakhtar Donetsk
FC Dynamo Kyiv	1:0	FC Volyn Lutsk
FC Stal Alchevsk	3:0	FC Obolon Kyiv
FC Spartak Ivano-Frankivsk	0:1	FC Chornomorets Odesa

=== Quarterfinals ===
Team 1	Agg.	Team 2	1st leg	2nd leg
FC Metalurh Zaporizhzhia	1–3	FC Chornomorets Odesa	1–1	0–2
FC Illichivets Mariupol	0–9	FC Dynamo Kyiv	0–8	0–1
FC Stal Alchevsk	1–3	FC Shakhtar Donetsk	0–0	1–3
FC Dnipro Dnipropetrovsk	6–2	SC Tavriya Simferopol	4–1	2–1

=== Semifinals ===
Team 1	Agg.	Team 2	1st leg	2nd leg
FC Chornomorets Odesa	0–2	FC Shakhtar Donetsk	0–1	0–1
FC Dnipro Dnipropetrovsk	2–2 (2–1 p)	FC Dynamo Kyiv	2–0	0–2 (a.e.t.)

=== Final ===
30 May 2004
17:00 LST

Shakhtar Donetsk (PL)	2–0	(PL) Dnipro Dnipropetrovsk
Byelik 1'; Stoican (red card) 30'; Tymoshchuk 88'	Report	Shelayev (red card) 31'

NSC Olimpiyskiy, Kyiv
Attendance: 68,000
Referee: Serhiy Shebek
