= 2002–03 Ukrainian Cup =

2002—03 Ukrainian Cup
Kubok Ukrainy

Tournament details
- Country: Ukraine
- Dates: 9 August 2002 – 25 May 2003
- Teams: 64

Final positions
- Champions: Dynamo Kyiv (6th title)
- Runners-up: Shakhtar Donetsk

The 2002–03 Ukrainian Cup was the 12th annual edition of Ukraine's football knockout competition, known as the Ukrainian Cup. The winner of this competition was Dynamo Kyiv, beating rival Shakhtar Donetsk in the final.

== Round and draw dates ==
All draws held at FFU headquarters (Building of Football) in Kyiv unless stated otherwise.

Round	Draw date	Game date	
Round	Draw date	First leg	Second leg
Round of 64	24 July 2002	9–10 August 2002	
Round of 32	?	24 August 2002	
Round of 16	?	19–20 October 2002	
Quarter-finals	?	16 November 2002	24 November 2002
Semi-finals	?	5 March 2003	16 April 2003
Final	25 May 2003 at NSC "Olimpiyskiy", Kyiv		

== Competition Schedule ==
=== Round of 64 ===
FC Stal Dniprodzerzhynsk	0:2	FC Shakhtar Donetsk
FC Enerhetyk Burshtyn	0:1	FC Dynamo Kyiv
FC Kovel-Volyn-2	1:3	FC Metalurh Donetsk
FC Krystal Kherson	0:1	FC Metalurh Zaporizhia
FC Avanhard Rovenky	0:3	FC Metalist Kharkiv
FC Zorya Luhansk	1:4	FC Dnipro Dnipropetrovsk
FC Halychyna Drohobych	0:1	SC Tavriya Simferopol
FC Nyva Ternopil	2:5	FC Karpaty Lviv
FC Shakhtar Luhansk	1:3	FC Kryvbas Kryvyi Rih
FC Dnister Ovidiopol	1:0	FC Metalurh Mariupol
FC Ros Bila Tserkva	1:2	FC Vorskla Poltava
FC Vuhlyk Dymytrov	0:2	FC Arsenal Kyiv
FC Veres Rivne	0:2	FC Polihraftekhnika Oleksandriya
FC Torpedo Zaporizhia	0:3	FC Volyn Lutsk
PFC Sevastopol	0:6	FC Chornomorets Odesa
FC Lukor Kalush	1:4	FC Obolon Kyiv
Olimpiya FC AES Uzhnoukrainsk	0:2	FC Zakarpattia Uzhhorod
FC Naftovyk Dolyna	1:3	FC Polissya Zhytomyr
FC Nafkom-Akademiya Irpin	2:1	FC Prykarpattia Ivano-Frankivsk
FC Desna Chernihiv	0:1	FC Stal Alchevsk
FC Tytan Armyansk	1:4	FC Naftovyk Okhtyrka
FC Hazovyk-Skala Stryi	0:1	FC Zirka Kirovohrad
FC Bukovyna Chernivtsi	2:3	SC Mykolaiv
FC Dynamo Simferopol	0:1	FC Borysfen Boryspil
SC Olkom Melitopol	1:0	FC CSKA Kyiv
FC Elektron Romny	1:0	FC Vinnytsia
FC Yavir Krasnopillya	0:0	FC Systema-Boreks Borodyanka	(pk: 4:3)
FC Podillya Khmelnytskyi	0:0	FC Krasyliv	(pk: 4:5)
FC Hirnyk-Sport Komsomolsk	0:2	FC Spartak Sumy
FC Chornohora Ivano-Frankivsk	0:2	FC Sokil Zolochiv
FC Tekhno-Center Rohatyn	1:3	FC Arsenal Kharkiv
FC Systema-KKhP Chernyakhiv	2:1	FC Elektrometalurh-NZF Nikopol

=== Round of 32 ===
FC Systema-KKhP Chernyakhiv	0:4	FC Shakhtar Donetsk
FC Polissya Zhytomyr	0:4	FC Dynamo Kyiv
FC Dnister Ovidiopol	2:3	FC Metalurh Donetsk
FC Sokil Zolochiv	1:0	FC Metalurh Zaporizhia
FC Krasyliv	1:1	FC Metalist Kharkiv	(pk: 3:2)
FC Naftovyk Okhtyrka	0:3	FC Dnipro Dnipropetrovsk
FC Arsenal Kharkiv	1:1	SC Tavriya Simferopol	(pk: 5:3)
FC Nafkom-Akademiya Irpin	1:0	FC Karpaty Lviv
SC Mykolaiv	0:1	FC Kryvbas Kryvyi Rih
SC Olkom Melitopol	0:1	FC Vorskla Poltava
FC Zirka Kirovohrad	2:3	FC Arsenal Kyiv
FC Stal Alchevsk	1:1	FC Polihraftekhnika Oleksandriya	(pk: 4:2)
FC Borysfen Boryspil	1:2	FC Volyn Lutsk
FC Yavir Krasnopillya	0:0	FC Chornomorets Odesa	(pk: 7:6)
FC Spartak Sumy	0:2	FC Obolon Kyiv
FC Elektron Romny	4:0	FC Zakarpattia Uzhhorod

=== Round of 16 (1/8) ===
FC Shakhtar Donetsk	4:0	FC Elektron Romny
FC Dynamo Kyiv	2:0	FC Stal Alchevsk
FC Obolon Kyiv	0:1	FC Metalurh Donetsk
FC Yavir Krasnopillya	0:3	FC Dnipro Dnipropetrovsk
FC Kryvbas Kryvyi Rih	1:0	FC Arsenal Kharkiv
FC Vorskla Poltava	3:2	FC Nafkom-Akademiya Irpin
FC Volyn Lutsk	3:0	FC Krasyliv
FC Arsenal Kyiv	4:0	FC Sokil Zolochiv

=== Quarterfinals ===
Team 1	Agg.	Team 2	1st leg	2nd leg
FC Kryvbas Kryvyi Rih	3–6	FC Shakhtar Donetsk	2–2	1–4
FC Volyn Lutsk	3–2	FC Metalurh Donetsk	3–0	0–2
FC Arsenal Kyiv	0–2	FC Dnipro Dnipropetrovsk	0–0	0–2
FC Dynamo Kyiv	5–0	FC Vorskla Poltava	1–0	4–0

=== Semifinals ===
Team 1	Agg.	Team 2	1st leg	2nd leg
FC Dnipro Dnipropetrovsk	1–3	FC Shakhtar Donetsk	0–0	1–3
FC Volyn Lutsk	1–7	FC Dynamo Kyiv	0–4	1–3

=== Final ===
25 May 2003
17:00 LST

Dynamo Kyiv (PL)	2–1 (a.e.t.)	(PL) Shakhtar Donetsk
Khatskevich 56'; Diogo Rincón 191'	Report	Vorobey 18'

NSC Olimpiyskiy, Kyiv
Attendance: 71,000
Referee: Andriy Shandor
