= Diogo Rincón =

Brazilian footballer (born 1980)

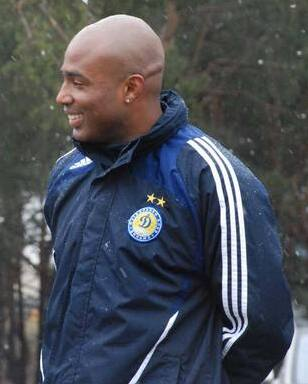

Personal information
- Full name: Diogo Augusto Pacheco da Fontoura
- Date of birth: 18 April 1980 (age 46)
- Place of birth: Porto Alegre, Brazil
- Height: 1.85 m (6 ft 1 in)
- Position: Midfielder

Senior career*
Years	Team	Apps	(Gls)
2000–2002	Internacional	32	(3)
2002–2009	Dynamo Kyiv	129	(46)
2002	→ Dynamo-2 Kyiv	3	(1)
2008	→ Corinthians (loan)	28	(4)
2009–2011	Kavala	25	(4)
2012	Canoas	4	(1)
Total		204	(57)

International career
1997	Brazil U17	6	(1)
- * Club domestic league appearances and goals

Diogo Augusto Pacheco da Fontoura, nickname Diogo Rincón or just Rincón (Ukrainian: Діого Рінкон; born on 18 April 1980) is a retired professional Brazilian football player, who played as a midfielder. After retiring, he had depression and alcohol problems, but has since recovered.

He became the first South American footballer in Ukraine who was among the best scorers in the Ukrainian Premier League.

== Early life ==
Rincon started playing football at the age of ten.

== Club career ==
Rincón was a product of Internacional's youth academy and was a featured regular prior to his transfer to Ukrainian giants Dynamo Kyiv in 2002. Unlike many other South Americans who were unable to succeed at Dynamo, Rincon is one of the few successes, having claimed a starting role at Dynamo after his first year at the Ukrainian club. Rincon holds the record for the fastest goal in Dynamo's European history – 24 seconds against Turkish club Fenerbahçe on 8 August 2006 in a UEFA Champions League qualifier.

In February 2008, Rincón left FC Dynamo Kyiv and joined on loan to Corinthians, in November 2008 turned back to Ukraine. On 25 April 2009, the Brazilian midfielder has terminated his contract with Dynamo Kyiv upon his request, he was a free agent and returned to Brazil. The player who plays in the attacking midfielder role signed on 25 July 2009 with Kavala he comes on a free transfer and signed until June 2010.

== International career ==
Rincón is former member of the U-17 Brazil squad that won the U-17 World Cup in 1997.

== Career statistics ==
=== Club ===
Club performance			League		Cup		Continental		Total	
Season	Club	League	Apps	Goals	Apps	Goals	Apps	Goals	Apps	Goals
Ukraine			League		Ukrainian Cup		Europe		Total	
2002–03	Dynamo Kyiv	Premier League	23	10	7	4	6	1	36	15
2003–04	Dynamo Kyiv	Premier League	29	5	6	2	8	4	43	11
2004–05	Dynamo Kyiv	Premier League	25	10	7	6	10	3	42	19
2005–06	Dynamo Kyiv	Premier League	23	10	4	0	2	0	29	10
2006–07	Dynamo Kyiv	Premier League	16	7	3 (Note: Including 1 match in Ukrainian Super Cup)	1	6	3	25	11
2007–08	Dynamo Kyiv	Premier League	13	4	1	0	5	1	19	5
Total			129	46	28	13	37	12	194	71

== Honours ==
Campeonato Gaucho: 2002

Ukrainian Premier League: 2003, 2004, 2007

Ukrainian Cup: 2003, 2005, 2006, 2007
