= 1992 FC Bukovyna Chernivtsi season =

Bukovyna Chernivtsi
1992 season
- Vyshcha Liha: 6th

The 1992 season was FC Bukovyna Chernivtsi's 35th season in existence and the club's 1st season in the top flight of Ukrainian football. In addition to the domestic league, Bukovyna Chernivtsi participated in that season's edition of the Ukrainian Cup. The season covers the period from 1 January 1992 to 17 June 1992.

== Players ==
=== First team squad ===
Squad at end of season

Note: Flags indicate national team as defined under FIFA eligibility rules; some limited exceptions apply. Players may hold more than one non-FIFA nationality.

No.	Pos.	Nation	Player
—	GK	(Ukraine) UKR	Ihor Krapyvkin
—	DF	(Ukraine) UKR	Serhiy Sobotyuk
—	DF	(Ukraine) UKR	Oleksandr Voytyuk
—	DF	(Russia) RUS	Vitali Markov
—	DF	(Ukraine) UKR	Yuriy Makhynya
—	MF	(Ukraine) UKR	Vasyl Zadorozhnyak
—	MF	(Ukraine) UKR	Leonid Fedorov
—	DF	(Ukraine) UKR	Asan Mustafayev
—	FW	(Russia) RUS	Valery Alistarov
—	MF	(Ukraine) UKR	Vitaliy Mintenko
—	MF	(Russia) RUS	Aleksandr Kislyakov

No.	Pos.	Nation	Player
—	FW	(Ukraine) UKR	Borys Finkel
—	GK	(Ukraine) UKR	Volodymyr Tsytkin
—	FW	(Russia) RUS	Yevgeni Kryachik
—	DF	(Ukraine) UKR	Yuriy Hiy
—	DF	(Russia) RUS	Andrei Zhirov
—	MF	(Ukraine) UKR	Viktor Budnyk
—	MF	(Ukraine) UKR	Oleksandr Ivanov
—	FW	(Ukraine) UKR	Viktor Oliynyk
—	FW	(Ukraine) UKR	Andriy Lutsiv
—	DF	(Ukraine) UKR	Ivan Rusnak

=== Left club during season ===
Note: Flags indicate national team as defined under FIFA eligibility rules; some limited exceptions apply. Players may hold more than one non-FIFA nationality.

No. / Pos. / Nation / Player; — / FW / (Russia) RUS / Lev Berezner (to Gekris Novorossiysk)	No. / Pos. / Nation / Player; — / DF / (Ukraine) UKR / Orest Shvets (to Sokil Berezhany)
