= Ukrainian Cup =

- Founded: 1992
- Region: Ukraine
- Qualifier for: UEFA Europa League; (UEFA Cup Winners' Cup before 1999)
- Domestic cup: Ukrainian Super Cup
- Current champions: Dynamo Kyiv (14th title)
- Most championships: Shakhtar Donetsk (15 titles)
- Website: www.ffu.org.ua
- 2026–27 Ukrainian Cup

The Ukrainian Cup (Ukrainian: Кубок України [ˈkubok ʊkrɐˈjinɪ]) is an association football national knockout cup competition run by the Ukrainian Association of Football. The competition is conducted almost exclusively among professional clubs. Since the 2003–04 season, the Cup winner qualifies to play the Ukrainian Premier League winner for the Ukrainian Super Cup.

Old logo

== Current format and eligibility criteria ==
=== 2026–27 season ===
Distribution
	Teams entering this round	Teams advancing from the previous round
Qualification round (18 teams)	18 entrants from regional associations	
Round of 64 (56 teams)	12 entrants of the Premier League; 14 entrants of the First League; 15 entrants of the Second League; 6 entrants of the Amateur Cup	9 winners from the Qualification round
Round of 32 (16 teams)	4 entrants from the Premier League	28 winners from the Round of 64

=== Rounds schedule ===
Phase	Round	Number of fixtures	Clubs remaining	Draw date	Game date
Qualification		9	18 → 9	31 July 2026	9-11 August 2026
Main event	Round of 64	28	56 → 28	31 July 2026	21-23 August 2026
Main event	Round of 32	16	32 → 16		
Main event	Round of 16	8	16 → 8		
Main event	Quarter-finals	4	8 → 4		
Main event	Semi-finals	2	4 → 2		
Main event	Final	1	2 → 1		19 May 2027

=== Qualification ===
For the competition are eligible first teams of all Ukrainian professional clubs including the top tier, the Premier League, and lower tiers from the Professional Football League, the First League (Persha) and the Second League (Druha). No reserve teams or second teams may enter the competition. An exception may be granted by the Ukrainian Association of Football if such team won the Ukrainian Amateur Cup or other qualification tournaments.

Beside professional clubs, to the competition is also invited both finalists of the Ukrainian Amateur Cup from the preceding season. If one or both finalists obtained professional status (admitted to the Second League (tier 3)), then one or more better performers of the amateur competition are invited, such as semifinalists or others.

The number of participants fluctuates from season to season around 50-70. This includes 30+ teams from the top two tiers, the Premier and the First leagues and about the same amount or less from the Second league and/or amateur participants. During the existence of the Ukrainian Second League Cup in 1999-2001, the number of participants was around 30. Following the 2014 Russian military aggression, the number of participants has sunk notably to around 50.

=== Format: draw and team entry ===
The format of this competition consists of two phases: a qualification phase with 2-3 rounds followed by the competition proper (3-4 rounds including the final game) when all Premier League (tier 1) clubs enter the competition.

The competition features a staggered entrance format where early rounds of the competition include matches between lower league competitions with teams of higher league competitions entering later. Often times the very first qualification round involves matches between the amateur teams and either the newly admitted professional clubs or clubs that struggled in prior season. After that in the next couple of qualification rounds enter clubs of the Second League (tier 3) and First League (tier 2).

Beside the initial draw, all the draws are conducted the next day after all the matches of the round is played. The draw for each round may be "blind" or teams may be grouped as "seeded" and "unseeded".

Often the Ukrainian Association of Football organizes the draw in qualification phase by geographic principles, so to accommodate "smaller" clubs (in lower tiers) by reducing their travel time.

=== Timeframe and the final ===
The competition usually starts in the early August or the second half of July. It takes an extensive break for winter months starting in November and resumes no early than the second half of March or early April. This break is driven by the climate situation.

The final takes place in the mid-May, often times, or by the end of May, normally.

Typically, the final used to take place at the Olimpiyskiy National Sports Complex in Kyiv, the country's capital, however due reconstruction of the stadium to prepare to the UEFA Euro 2012, the final had been played at other venues temporarily. After that this tradition has ceased.

=== Past variations of the format ===
Past variations of the competition involved a home-away type of elimination, but the Ukrainian Cup has since changed to a single game per round format. In recent years, a conditional replay game was introduced to avoid penalty shootouts. Cup draws may be conducted for two consecutive rounds, but usually occur before each following round. The lower division teams are usually awarded the home-field advantage (or the first leg at home in case of a two-leg round).

Until the big football reform of 1996, the competition featured winners of regional football cup competitions from all oblasts (regions) as well as the Autonomous Republic of Crimea. Following the 1996 reform, the qualification of the regional football cup competition winners was discontinued.

Between 1999 and 2001, additional competition existed, serving as a qualification for the Ukrainian Cup. It was known as the Ukrainian Second League Cup. It was created in order to make the Ukrainian Cup more competitive, involving participation of only the strongest teams. Following the discontinuation of the competition, the participation of the second teams (reserve teams) in the Ukrainian Cup became restricted.

== Trophy ==
There were at least 5 trophies, 2 during the Soviet period and 3 following the fall of the Soviet Union.

The newest trophy was introduced right before the start of the 2025–26 Ukrainian Cup competition, featuring the ceremonial mace "Bulava".

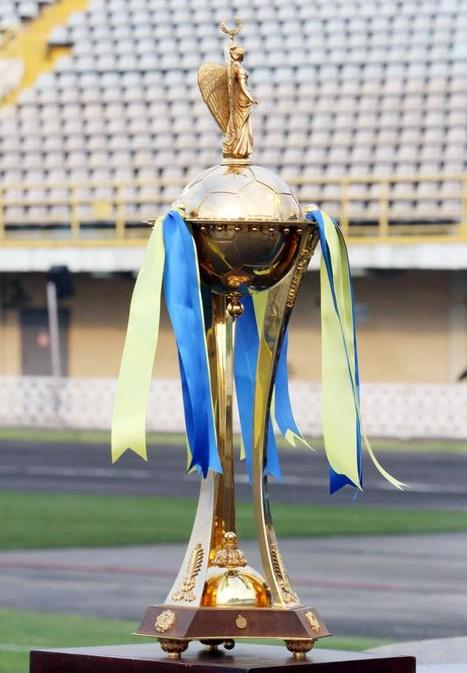
The competition's trophy featuring the Greek goddess Nike in 2000 to 2025

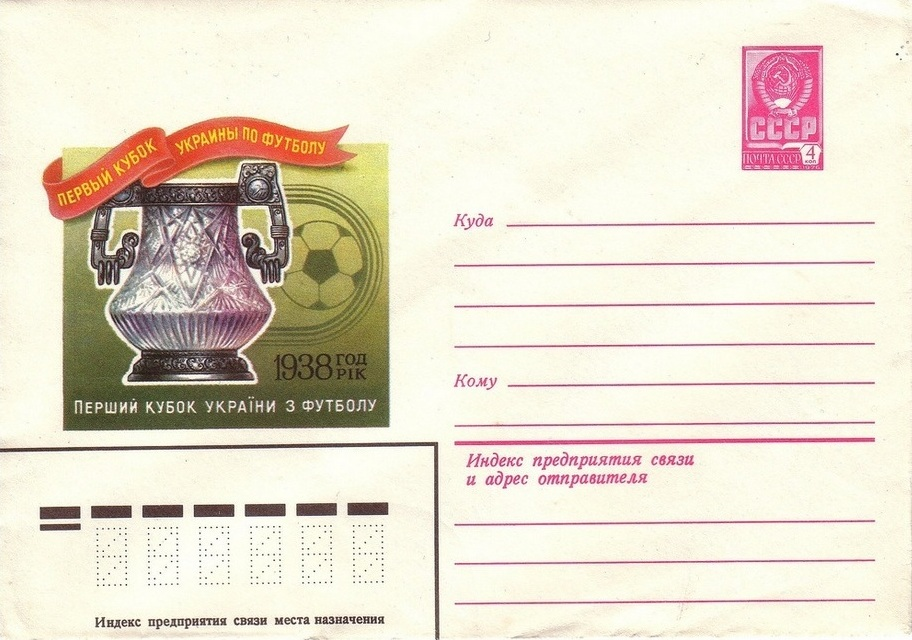
The Pre-World War II (the Eastern Front) "Ukrainian Bowl" (Kelykh), 1936 to 1940, the original trophy was lost during the war

== History ==
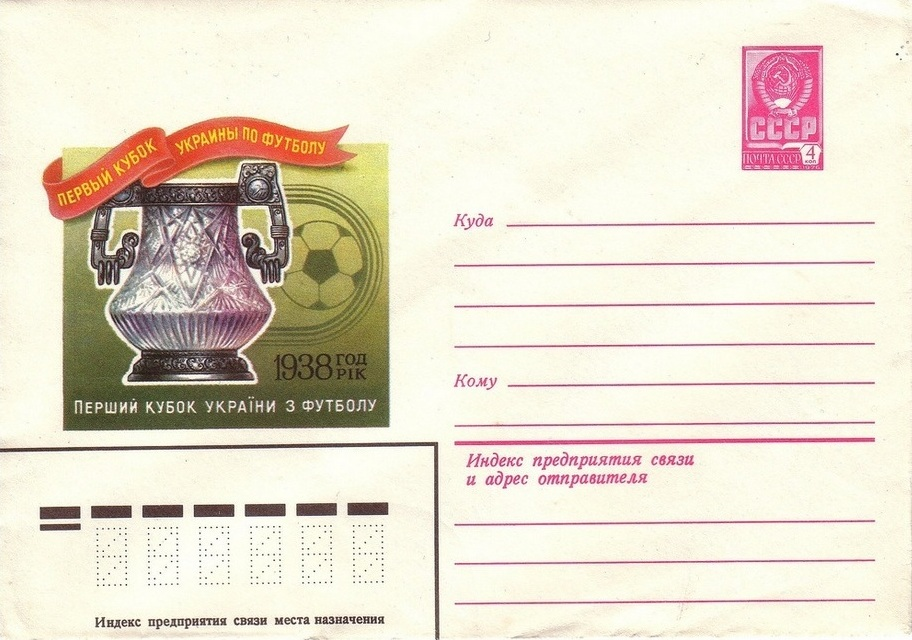
First Ukrainian SSR Cup on cover of the Soviet Union

Ukrainian Cup competitions have been conducted since at least 1936. The inaugural season was held in 1936 and was officially known as the Spring Championship, a decision adopted by the All-Ukrainian football Section. Initially called also the Spring Championship, sometime during the 1937 season the tournament was renamed by the mass media as the Cup of the Ukrainian SSR (Ukrainian: Кубок УРСР, Kubok URSR). The official change was adopted by the Republican Football Conference only in April 1938. To commemorate the event, in 1979 the Soviet Ministry of Communications released an envelope with a depiction of the trophy (see the picture). The streamer on top of the picture reads in the Russian language "The first Cup of Ukraine in football" (Russian: Первый кубок Украины по футболу, Pervyi kubok Ukrainy po futbolu) while the same thing is written at the picture's footer in the Ukrainian language (Ukrainian: Перший кубок України з футболу, Pershyi kubok Ukrayiny z futbolu). Already in 1939, the tournament was downgraded, becoming a feeder to the Soviet Football Cup. And, if before it involved participation of all best Ukrainian football teams, in 1939 only regional-level teams participated.

Following the liberation of the Soviet Union from the Nazi Germany occupation in 1944, as compensation for the canceled republican championship, the next tournament was conducted in September. The decision to conduct the tournament was adopted on 6 September 1944 by the Central Committee of the Communist Party of Ukraine. The tournament was restored to all-Ukrainian status, involving participation of the best teams in Ukraine and was known as Ukrainian Cup or Ukrainian Bowl (Ukrainian: Келих УРСР, Kelykh URSR). After World War II, subsequent editions of the national Cup were downgraded once again to a republican cup competition that was limited to lower league clubs and teams participating in the KFK competitions (amateurs). It was also integrated into the Soviet Football Cup as its feeder. The timeframe of the tournament also shifted from springtime to fall (end of calendar year). Already in 1948 FC Lokomotyv Kharkiv, as one of the Soviet Top League clubs from Ukraine, chose not to participate in the Ukrainian Cup competition.

In 1957, the Soviet Amateur Cup (USSR Football Cup for KFK) was established, and since then the Ukrainian Cup winner has qualified for that competition instead of the Soviet Football Cup. The first team to do so was SKA Odessa in 1957.

In the 1970s, the Ukrainian Cup for the teams of masters was established that ran parallel to the Ukrainian Cup. That competition involved participation of the Ukrainian teams of masters that competed in the Soviet Second League. In the second half of 1970, the tournament was discontinued once again until 1990. In 1989, the last season of the Ukrainian Cup competition took place, the winner of which qualified to the Soviet Amateur Cup. The 1990 Ukrainian Cup competition involved participation of the Soviet Second League B teams. A similar season was conducted the following year, in 1991. The winner of the 1991 Ukrainian Cup, FC Temp Shepetivka, was admitted to the 1992 Vyshcha Liha (Ukrainian top tier) competition following the dissolution of the Soviet Union.

The first Cup competition in independent Ukraine had an unlikely winner, similar to the championship of 1992. The main contender, Dynamo Kyiv, settled for a draw in its first game at home against a team that was an amateur club in Soviet times, Skala Stryi. In the following quarter-finals round, the team faced defeat by Torpedo Zaporizhia. Eventually, that competition was won by Chornomorets Odesa.

In 2008, the Football Federation of Ukraine signed a contract with the company Datagroup, naming the company as the main sponsor of the tournament for the next four years. Datagroup introduced its new version of the cup trophy, the first winner of which became Shakhtar Donetsk. In 2010, there was an attempt to launch an independent website for the competition, which was active for only a couple of months.

== Venues ==
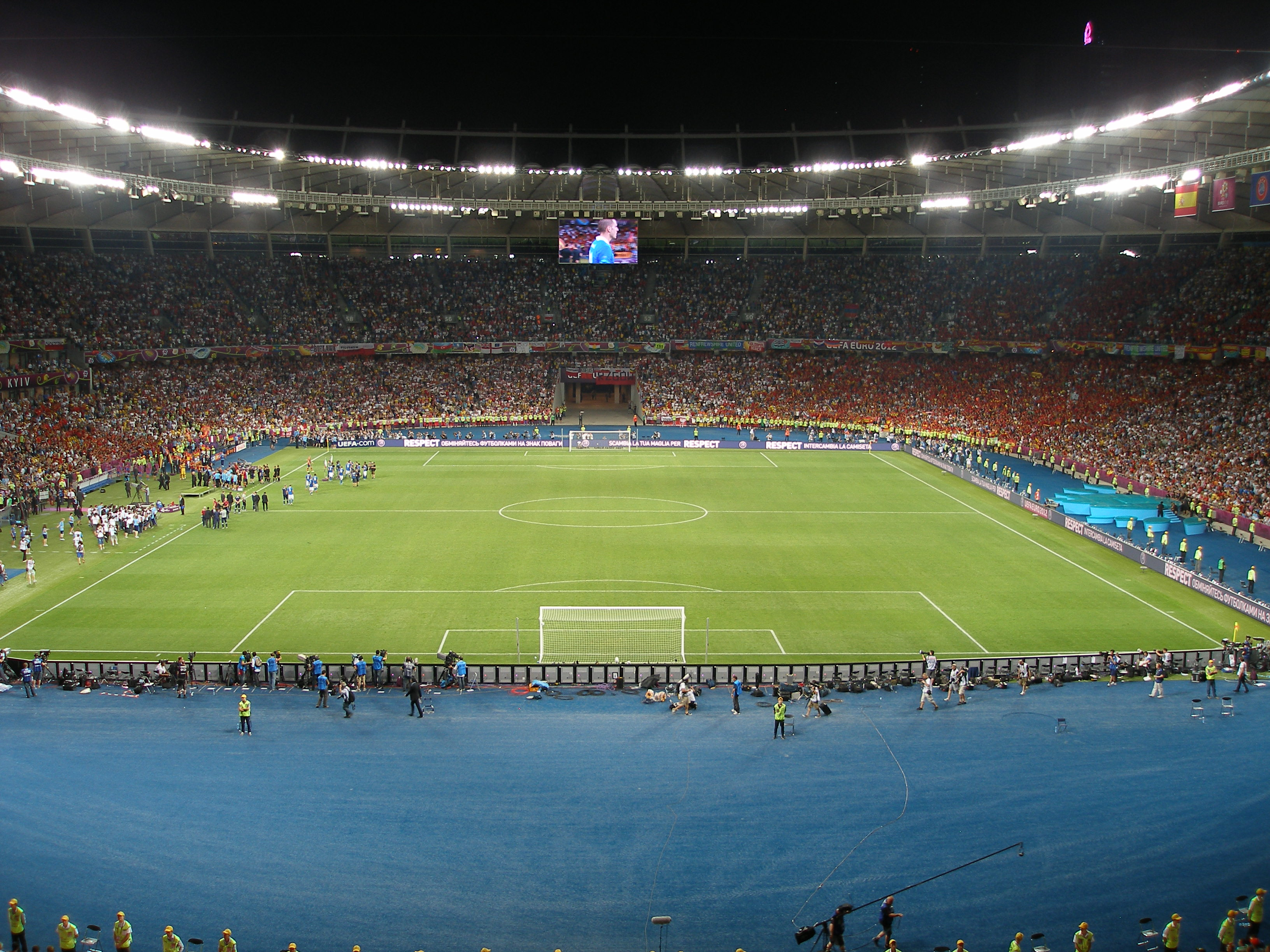
Olimpiyskiy

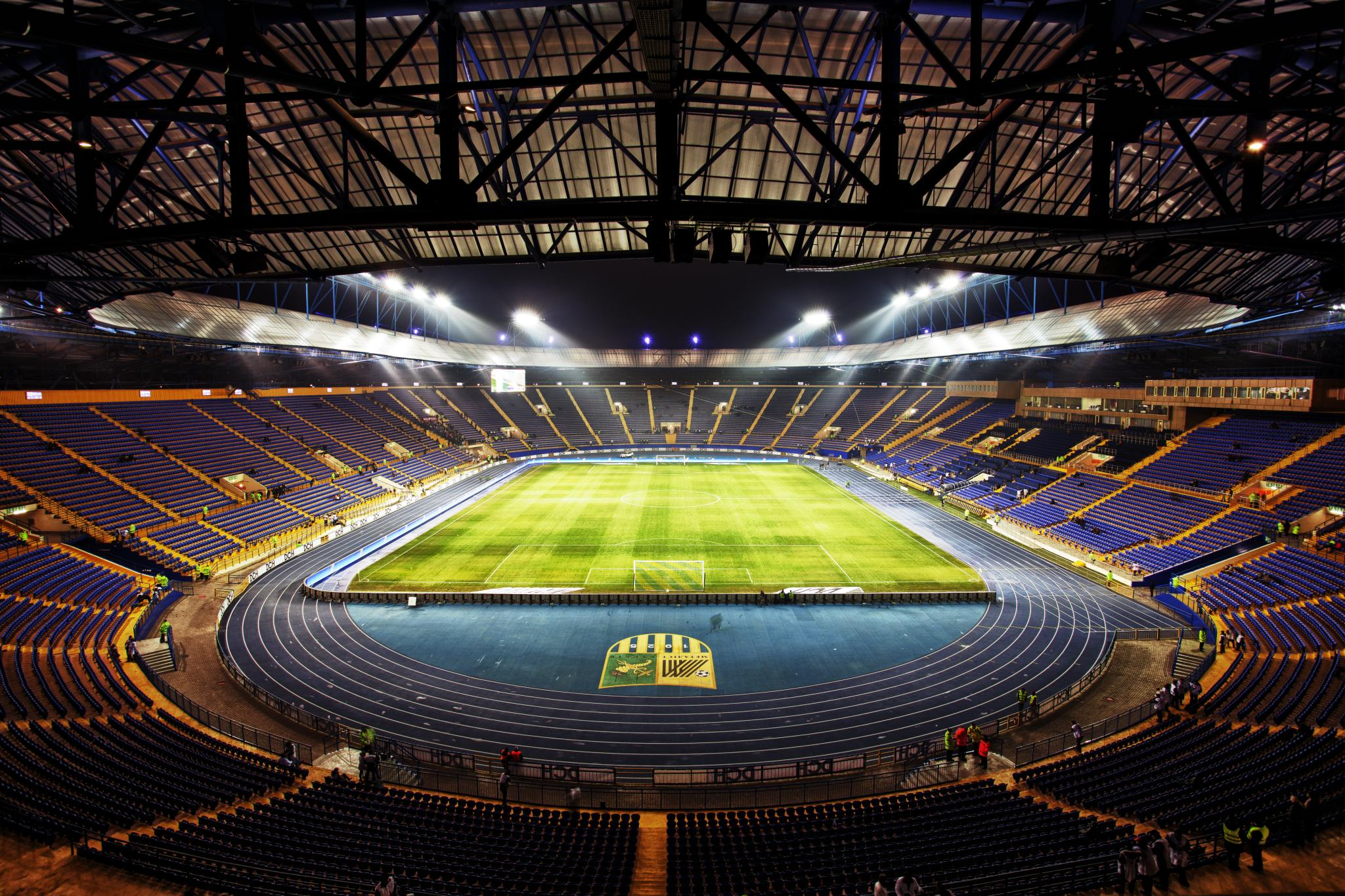
Metalist

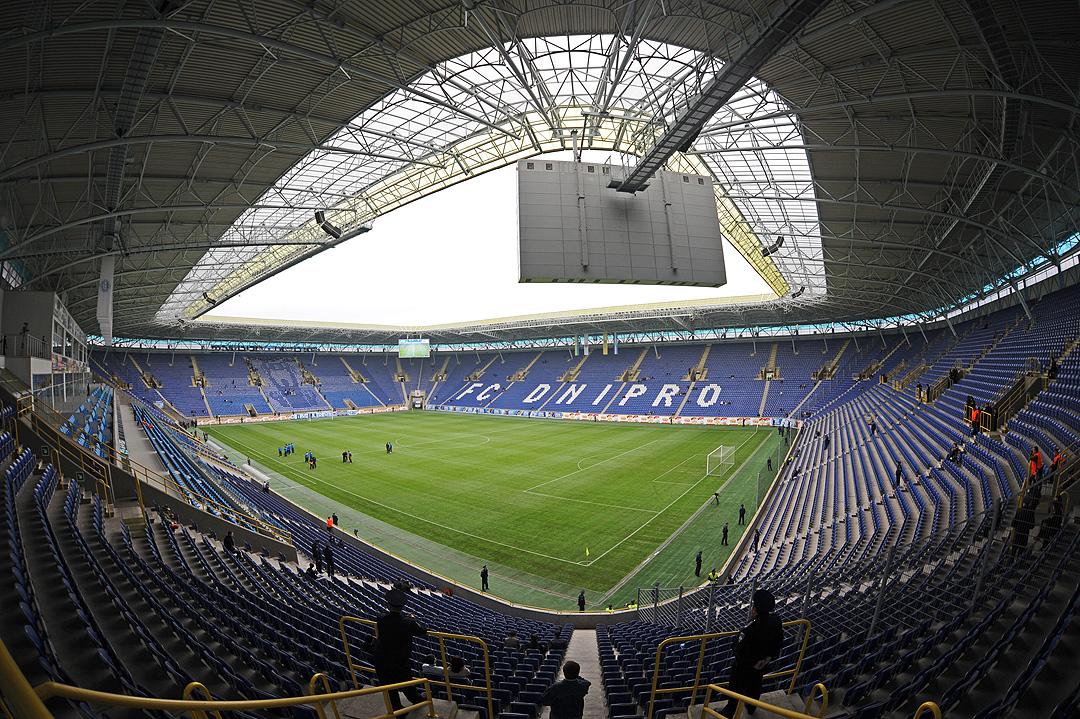
Dnipro

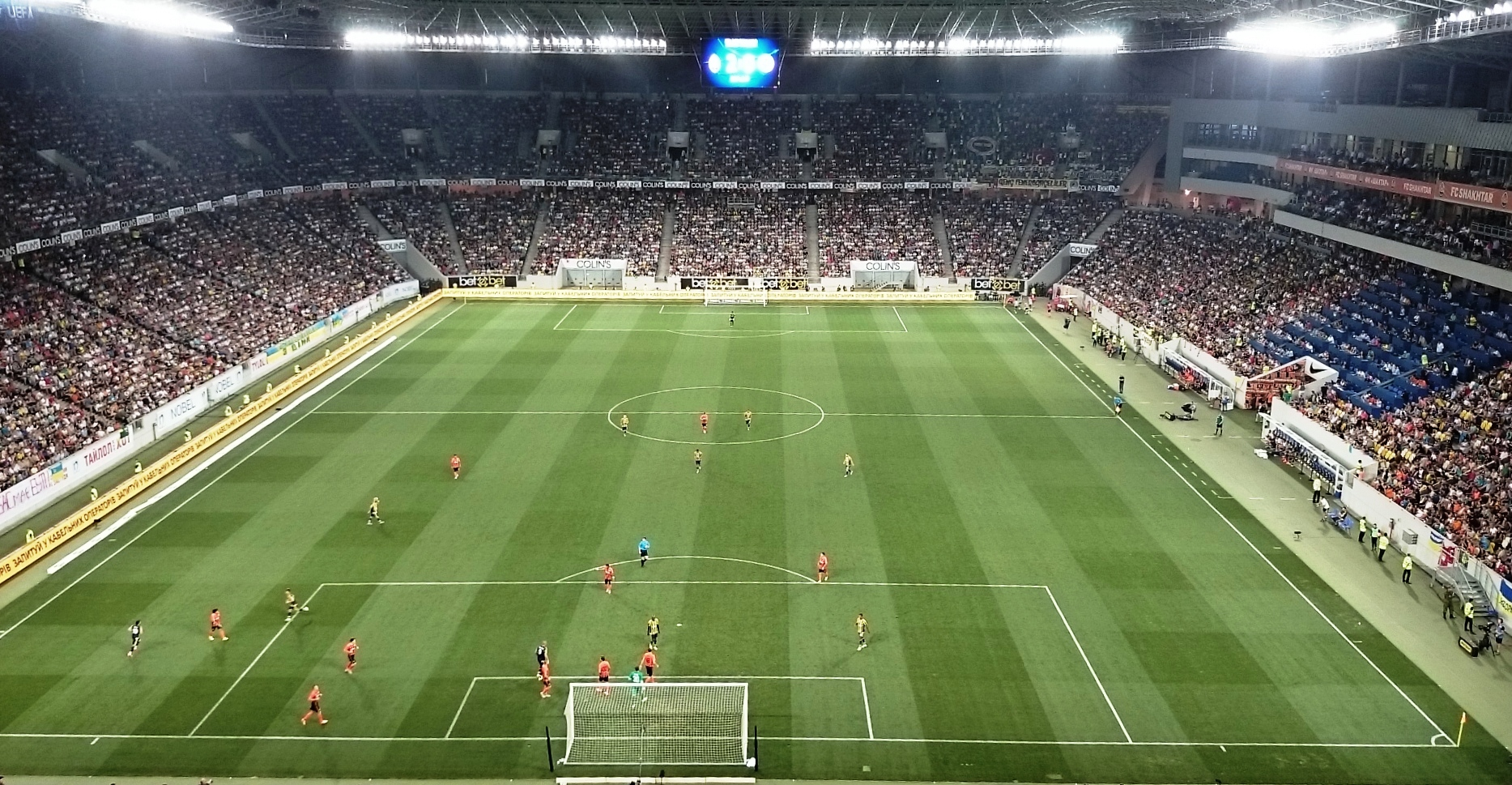
Lviv

most used arenas

The Ukrainian Cup finals are played most often at the main countries association football venue, Olympiyskiy National Sports Complex. Since 2008 and establishing of the Ukrainian Premier League, the final games started to be conducted at alternative stadiums among which most often was used the Metalist Oblast Sports Complex and the Dnipro Arena.

- 18– Natsionalnyi Sportyvnyi Kompleks "Olimpiyskyi" (Olimpiyskiy National Sports Complex), Kyiv
- 5 – Oblastnyi Sportynvnyi Kompleks "Metalist" (Metalist Oblast Sports Complex), Kharkiv
- 2 – Dnipro-Arena, Dnipro
- 2 – Arena Lviv, Lviv
- 1 – Stadion "Yuvileinyi" (Yuvileiny Stadium), Sumy
- 1 – Stadion "Vorskla" imeni Oleksiya Butovskoho (Oleksiy Butovsky Vorskla Stadium), Poltava
- 1 – Slavutych Arena, Zaporizhia
- 1 – Ternopilskyi miskyi stadion imeni Romana Shukhevycha (Roman Shukhevych Ternopil city stadium), Ternopil
- 1 – Stadion "Avanhard" (Avanhard Stadium), Rivne
- 1 – Tsentralnyi miskyi stadion (Central City Stadium), Zhytomyr

== Finals ==
Year	Dates	Teams	Winner	Score	Runner-up	Final Venue
1992; Final	10 February – 31 May	45	Chornomorets Odesa; Ilia Tsymbalar 107'	1 – 0 (0 – 0) (a.e.t.)	Metalist Kharkiv	31 May 1992 19:00 (EEST); Kyiv – Republican Stadium; Attendance: 12,000
1992–93; Final	26 July – 30 May	80	Dynamo Kyiv; Victor Leonenko 23'; Dmytro Topchiyev 64'	2 – 1 (1 – 0)	Karpaty Lviv; Ihor Plotko 89' (pen.)	30 May 1993 ? (EEST); Kyiv – Republican Stadium; Attendance: 47,000
1993–94; Final	1 August – 29 May	80	Chornomorets Odesa	0 – 0 (0 – 0) (a.e.t.) (5–3 p)	Tavriya Simferopol	29 May 1994 17:00 (EEST); Kyiv – Republican Stadium; Attendance: 5,000
1994–95; Final	21 August – 28 May	107	Shakhtar Donetsk; Ihor Petrov 78'	1 – 1 (0 – 1) (a.e.t.) (7–6 p)	Dnipro Dnipropetrovsk; Aleksandr Zakharov 23'	28 May 1995 ? (EEST); Kyiv – Republican Stadium; Attendance: 42,500
1995–96; Final	1 August – 26 May	110	Dynamo Kyiv; Serhii Rebrov 27'; Yuri Maximov 59'	2 – 0 (1 – 0)	Nyva Vinnytsia	26 May 1996 ? (EEST); Kyiv – NSC "Olimpiyskiy"; Attendance: 47,000
1996–97; Final	14 August – 25 May	73	Shakhtar Donetsk; Serhiy Atelkin 36'	1 – 0 (1 – 0)	Dnipro Dnipropetrovsk	25 May 1997 ? (EEST); Kyiv – NSC "Olimpiyskiy"; Attendance: 26,000
1997–98; Final	14 July – 31 May	90	Dynamo Kyiv; Andriy Shevchenko 1', 30'	2 – 1 (2 – 0)	CSKA Kyiv; Vasyl Novokhatskyi 54'	31 May 1998 ? (EEST); Kyiv – NSC "Olimpiyskiy"; Attendance: 43,500
1998–99; Final	1 August – 30 May	63	Dynamo Kyiv; Andriy Shevchenko 18', 67'; Valentin Belkevich 19'	3 – 0 (2 – 0)	Karpaty Lviv	30 May 1999 ? (EEST); Kyiv – NSC "Olimpiyskiy"; Attendance: 71,000
2000; Final	11 March – 27 May	32	Dynamo Kyiv; Aliaksandr Khatskevich 45'	1 – 0 (1 – 0)	Kryvbas Kryvyi Rih	27 May 2000 ? (EEST); Kyiv – NSC "Olimpiyskiy"; Attendance: 45,500
2000–01; Final	16 September – 27 May	28	Shakhtar Donetsk; Serhiy Atelkin 78', 119'	2 – 1 (0 – 1; 1 – 1) (a.e.t.)	CSKA Kyiv; Ruslan Kostyshyn 7'	27 May 2001 17:00 (EEST); Kyiv – NSC "Olimpiyskiy"; Attendance: 55,000
2001–02; Final	14 July – 26 May	59	Shakhtar Donetsk; Serhiy Popov 10'; Serhiy Atelkin 81'; Andriy Vorobei 99'	3 – 2 (1 – 1; 2 – 2) (a.e.t.)	Dynamo Kyiv; Valentin Belkevich 31'; Maksim Shatskikh 50'	26 May 2002 19:00 (EEST); Kyiv – NSC "Olimpiyskiy"; Attendance: 81,000
2002–03; Final	9 August – 25 May	64	Dynamo Kyiv; Aliaksandr Khatskevich 56'; Diogo Rincón 90+'	2 – 1 (0 – 1)	Shakhtar Donetsk; Andriy Vorobei 18'	25 May 2003 17:00 (EEST); Kyiv – NSC "Olimpiyskiy"; Attendance: 71,000
2003–04; Final	8 August – 30 May	64	Shakhtar Donetsk; Oleksiy Byelik 1'; Anatoliy Tymoshchuk 90+'	2 – 0 (1 – 0)	Dnipro Dnipropetrovsk	30 May 2004 17:00 (EEST); Kyiv – NSC "Olimpiyskiy"; Attendance: 60,000
2004–05; Final	4 August – 29 May	64	Dynamo Kyiv; Diogo Rincón 11' (pen.)	1 – 0 (1 – 0)	Shakhtar Donetsk	29 May 2005 17:00 (EEST); Kyiv – NSC "Olimpiyskiy"; Attendance: 68,000
2005–06; Final	1 August – 2 May	69	Dynamo Kyiv; Kléber 47'	1 – 0 (0 – 0)	Metalurh Zaporizhya	2 May 2006 17:00 (EEST); Kyiv – NSC "Olimpiyskiy"; Attendance: 25,000
2006–07; Final	11 August – 28 May	59	Dynamo Kyiv; Kléber 58'; Oleh Husyev 80'	2 – 1 (0 – 0)	Shakhtar Donetsk; Elano 89'	28 May 2007 19:00 (EEST); Kyiv – NSC "Olimpiyskiy"; Attendance: 64,500
2007–08; Final	20 July – 7 May	54	Shakhtar Donetsk; Oleksandr Hladkyy 44'; Oleksiy Hai 78'	2 – 0 (1 – 0)	Dynamo Kyiv	7 May 2008 19:00 (EEST); Kharkiv – OSC "Metalist"; Attendance: 28,000
2008–09; Final	8 July – 31 May	62	Vorskla Poltava; Vasyl Sachko 50'	1 – 0 (0 – 0)	Shakhtar Donetsk	31 May 2009 17:00 (EEST); Dnipropetrovsk – Dnipro Arena; Attendance: 25,700
2009–10; Final	7 July – 16 May	52	Tavriya Simferopol; Maksym Feschuk 2'; Oleksandr Kovpak 40' (pen.); Lucky Idahor 96'	3 – 2 (2 – 0; 2 – 2) (a.e.t.)	Metalurh Donetsk; Henrikh Mkhitaryan 51'; Mário Sérgio 74'	16 May 2010 17:00 (EEST); Kharkiv – OSC "Metalist"; Attendance: 21,000
2010–11; Final	27 July – 25 May	53	Shakhtar Donetsk; Eduardo da Silva 64'; Luiz Adriano 87'	2 – 0 (0 – 0)	Dynamo Kyiv	25 May 2011 20:15 (EEST); Sumy – Stadium "Yuvileiny"; Attendance: 27,800
2011–12; Final	16 July – 6 May	58	Shakhtar Donetsk; Alex Teixeira 23'; Oleksandr Kucher 104'	2 – 1 (1 – 0; 1 – 1) (a.e.t.)	Metalurh Donetsk; Mykola Morozyuk 68'	6 May 2012 19:30 (EEST); Kyiv – NSC "Olimpiyskiy"; Attendance: 47,314
2012–13; Final	25 July – 22 May	55	Shakhtar Donetsk; Fernandinho 41'; Alex Teixeira 53'; Taison 73'	3 – 0 (1 – 0)	Chornomorets Odesa	22 May 2013 19:45 (EEST); Kharkiv – OSC "Metalist"; Attendance: 40,003
2013–14; Final	24 July – 15 May	51	Dynamo Kyiv; Oleksandr Kucher 40' (o.g.); Domagoj Vida 43'	2 – 1 (2 – 0)	Shakhtar Donetsk; Douglas Costa 57'	15 May 2014 20:00 (EEST); Poltava – Stadium "Vorskla" Butovskoho; Attendance: 9,700
2014–15; Final	6 August – 4 June	39	Dynamo Kyiv	0 – 0 (0 – 0) (a.e.t.) (5–4 p)	Shakhtar Donetsk	4 June 2015 21:00 (EEST); Kyiv – NSC "Olimpiyskiy"; Attendance: 53,455
2015–16; Final	22 July – 21 May	45	Shakhtar Donetsk; Oleksandr Hladkyy 42', 57'	2 – 0 (1 – 0)	Zorya Luhansk	21 May 2016 17:00 (EEST); Lviv – Arena Lviv; Attendance: 21,720
2016–17; Final	20 July – 17 May	45	Shakhtar Donetsk; Marlos 81'	1 – 0 (0 – 0)	Dynamo Kyiv	17 May 2017 21:00 (EEST); Kharkiv – OSC "Metalist"; Attendance: 25,000
2017–18; Final	9 July – 9 May	52	Shakhtar Donetsk; Facundo Ferreyra 48'; Yaroslav Rakytskyi 61'	2 – 0 (0 – 0)	Dynamo Kyiv	9 May 2018 20:30 (EEST); Dnipro – Dnipro Arena; Attendance: 28,155
2018–19; Final	18 July – 15 May	50	Shakhtar Donetsk; Tetê 28', 39'; Júnior Moraes 45+2'; Manor Solomon 65'	4 – 0 (3 – 0)	Inhulets Petrove	15 May 2019 21:00 (EEST); Zaporizhia – Slavutych Arena; Attendance: 11,100
2019–20; Final	20 August – 8 July	49	Dynamo Kyiv; Benjamin Verbič 28'	1 – 1 (1 – 1) (a.e.t.) (8–7 p)	Vorskla Poltava; Ruslan Stepanyuk 11'	8 July 2020 21:30 (EEST); Kharkiv – OSC "Metalist"; Attendance:0
2020–21; Final	26 August – 13 May	55	Dynamo Kyiv; Viktor Tsyhankov 98'	1 – 0 (0 – 0) (a.e.t.)	Zorya Luhansk	13 May 2021 19:00 (EEST); Ternopil – Ternopil City Stadium Shukhevycha; Attendance: 3,000
2021–22	4 August – 11 May	65	interrupted at quarterfinals due to war			11 May 2022 (the final was scheduled)
2022–23	no competition due to war					
2023–24; Final	29 July – 15 May	51	Shakhtar Donetsk; Danylo Sikan 40'; Yukhym Konoplya 55'	2 – 1 (1 – 0)	Vorskla Poltava; Mykola Kovtalyuk 85'	15 May 2024 19:00 (EEST); Rivne – Stadium "Avanhard"; Attendance: 3,500
2024–25; Final	3 August – 14 May	49	Shakhtar Donetsk; Kauã Elias 64'	1 – 1 (0 – 1) (a.e.t.) (6–5 p)	Dynamo Kyiv; Andriy Yarmolenko 43'	14 May 2025; Zhytomyr – Central City Stadium; Attendance: 4,740
2025–26; Final	8 August – 20 May	68	Dynamo Kyiv; Vitaliy Buyalskyi 26', 53'; Andriy Yarmolenko 70'	3 – 1 (1 – 1)	FC Chernihiv; Anatoliy Romanchenko 34'	20 May 2026; Lviv – Arena Lviv; Attendance: 4,889
2026–27; Final	9 August – 19 May	69	TBD	x – x	TBD	19 May 2027 (city) – (stadium); Attendance:

=== Top scorers of finals ===
No	Name	Club(s)	Goals
1	(Ukraine) Andriy Shevchenko	Dynamo Kyiv	4
1	(Ukraine) Serhiy Atelkin	Shakhtar Donetsk	4
3	(Ukraine) Oleksandr Hladkyy	Shakhtar Donetsk	3
4	(Belarus) Valiantsin Bialkevich^{†}	Dynamo Kyiv	2
4	(Belarus) Aliaksandr Khatskevich	Dynamo Kyiv	2
4	(Ukraine) Andriy Vorobei	Shakhtar Donetsk	2
4	(Brazil) Diogo Rincón	Dynamo Kyiv	2
4	(Brazil) Kléber	Dynamo Kyiv	2
4	(Brazil) Alex Teixeira	Shakhtar Donetsk	2
4	(Brazil) Tetê	Shakhtar Donetsk	2
4	(Ukraine) Vitaliy Buyalskyi	Dynamo Kyiv	2
4	(Ukraine) Andriy Yarmolenko	Dynamo Kyiv	2
13	35 players		1

== Performances ==
Achievements of clubs since 1992

Team	Winners	Winning years	Runners-up	Runners years	Finals
Shakhtar Donetsk	15	1995, 1997, 2001, 2002, 2004, 2008, 2011, 2012, 2013, 2016, 2017, 2018, 2019, 2024, 2025	6	2003, 2005, 2007, 2009, 2014, 2015	21
Dynamo Kyiv	14	1993, 1996, 1998, 1999, 2000, 2003, 2005, 2006, 2007, 2014, 2015, 2020, 2021, 2026	6	2002, 2008, 2011, 2017, 2018, 2025	19
Chornomorets Odesa	2	1992, 1994	1	2013	3
Vorskla Poltava	1	2009	2	2020, 2024	3
Tavriya Simferopol	1	2010	1	1994	2
Dnipro Dnipropetrovsk	–	—	3	1995, 1997, 2004	3
Karpaty Lviv	–	—	2	1993, 1999	2
CSKA Kyiv	–	—	2	1998, 2001	2
Metalurh Donetsk	–	—	2	2010, 2012	2
Zorya Luhansk	–	—	2	2016, 2021	2
Metalist Kharkiv	–	—	1	1992	1
Nyva Vinnytsia	–	—	1	1996	1
Kryvbas Kryvyi Rih	–	—	1	2000	1
Metalurh Zaporizhzhia	–	—	1	2006	1
Inhulets Petrove	–	—	1	2019	1
Chernihiv	–	—	1	2026	1

- Note: Defunct teams marked in Italics.

=== All-time table ===
Top-10. All figures are correct through the 2017–18 season.

PL	Team	Seasons	GP	W	D	L	GS	GA	Pts	Achievement
1	Shakhtar Donetsk	27	151	111	21	19	346	106	354	champion
2	Dynamo Kyiv	27	144	112	16	16	345	90	352	champion
3	FC Dnipro	27	117	68	17	32	188	105	221	finalist
4	Tavriya Simferopol	24	87	49	15	23	141	97	162	champion
5	Karpaty Lviv	27	89	45	12	32	130	96	147	finalist
6	Vorskla Poltava	27	84	44	12	28	113	97	144	champion
7	Chornomorets Odesa	27	92	44	12	36	148	99	144	champion
8	Volyn Lutsk	27	84	42	8	34	141	128	134	semi-finalist
9	Metalurh Zaporizhia	27	80	40	11	29	119	94	131	finalist
10	Metalurh Donetsk	20	70	37	10	23	107	91	121	finalist

== Competition people ==
=== Managers ===
Winning managers
Manager	Club(s)	Wins	Winning years
(Romania) Mircea Lucescu	Shakhtar Donetsk	7	2003–04, 2007–08, 2010–11, 2011–12, 2012–13, 2015–16
(Romania) Mircea Lucescu	Dynamo Kyiv	7	2020–21
(Ukraine) Valery Lobanovsky	Dynamo Kyiv	3	1997–98, 1998–99, 1999–2000
(Ukraine) Viktor Prokopenko	Chonomorets Odesa	3	1992, 1993–94
(Ukraine) Viktor Prokopenko	Shakhtar Donetsk	3	2000–01
(Portugal) Paulo Fonseca	Shakhtar Donetsk	3	2016–17, 2017–18, 2018–19
(Ukraine) Yozhef Sabo	Dynamo Kyiv	2	1995–96, 2004–05
(Ukraine) Anatoliy Demyanenko	Dynamo Kyiv	2	2005–06, 2006–07
(Ukraine) Serhiy Rebrov	Dynamo Kyiv	2	2013–14, 2014–15
(Ukraine) Oleksiy Mykhaylichenko	Dynamo Kyiv	2	2002–03, 2019–20
(Netherlands) Marino Pušić	Shakhtar Donetsk	2	2023–24, 2024–25
(Ukraine) Mykhailo Fomenko	Dynamo Kyiv	1	1992–93
(Russia) Vladimir Salkov	Shakhtar Donetsk	1	1994–95
(Ukraine) Valeriy Yaremchenko	Shakhtar Donetsk	1	1996–97
(Italy) Nevio Scala	Shakhtar Donetsk	1	2001–02
(Ukraine) Mykola Pavlov	Vorskla Poltava	1	2008–09
(Ukraine) Serhiy Puchkov	Tavriya Simferepol	1	2009–10
(Ukraine) Ihor Kostyuk	Dynamo Kyiv	1	2025–26

=== Players ===
Leaders with the most games played
Rank	Player	Year(s)	Games per team(s) (Note: teams are in chronological order of playing career; in 1990s in Ukrainian Cup competed also reserve teams out of lower leagues)	Games total
1	(Ukraine) Ruslan Kostyshyn	1995 – 2012	Advis (2), Podillia (2), CSKA/Arsenal (28), Dnipro (25), Kryvbas (6)	63
2	(Ukraine) Oleksandr Shovkovskyi	1993 – 2015	Dynamo-3 (2), Dynamo (58)	60
3	(Ukraine) Oleksandr Chyzhevskyi	1993 – 2009	Karpaty (32), Metalurh Z (7), Volyn (1), Tavriya (13), Zakarpattia (5)	58
4	(Ukraine) Oleksandr Holovko	1992 – 2006	Tavriya (24), Dynamo (32)	56
4	(Ukraine) Vitaliy Reva	1994 – 2010	Polihraftekhnika (4), CSKA/Arsenal (34), Dynamo (16), Tavriya (2)	56
4	(Ukraine) Hennadiy Zubov	1994 – 2008	Stal A (3), Shakhtar (48), Illichivets (2), Metalurh D (1), Zoria (1), Komunalnyk (1)	56
4	(Ukraine) Volodymyr Yezerskyi	1996 – 2014	Harai (6), Karpaty (7), Dynamo (2), Kryvbas (4), Dnipro (20), Shakhtar (12), Zoria (2), Tavriya (2), Hoverla (1)	56
8	(Ukraine) Dmytro Shutkov	1992 – 2007	Shakhtar	54
8	(Ukraine) Ruslan Rotan	2001 – 2018	Dnipro (42), Dynamo (12)	54
10	(Ukraine) Andriy Vorobei	1996 – 2013	Shakhtar (4), Shakhtar (44), Dnipro (2), Arsenal (1), Metalist (2)	53
11	(Ukraine) Serhii Rebrov	1992 – 2010	Shakhtar (6), Dynamo (44), Irpin (1)	51
11	(Ukraine) Mykhailo Starostiak	1994 – 2007	Prykarpattia (6), Shakhtar (42), Kryvbas (3)	51
13	(Ukraine) Serhiy Mizin	1993 – 2008	Dynamo-2 (3), Dynamo (18), Dnipro (2), CSKA/Arsenal (5), Karpaty (11), Kryvbas (7), Metalist (4)	50
The table includes players who played over 50 games in the competition. Players who share number of tallies placed in order of seniority by years and then alphabetical order. Data is through winter of 2020–2021.

All-time Ukrainian Cup scorers
Rank	Player	Year(s)	Goals per team(s) (Note: teams are in chronological order of playing career; in 1990s in Ukrainian Cup competed also reserve teams out of lower leagues)	Goals total
1	(Ukraine) Andriy Vorobei	1996 – 2013	Shakhtar-2 (2), Shakhtar (22), Metalist (1)	25
2	(Uzbekistan) Maksim Shatskikh	2000 – 2015	Dynamo (22), Arsenal (1), Hoverla (1)	24
3	(Ukraine) Oleksandr Palianytsia	1992 – 2003	Dnipro (7), Veres (4), Karpaty (5), Kryvbas (3), Metalist (3)	22
4	(Ukraine) Andriy Shevchenko	1994 – 2012	Dynamo-2 (5), Dynamo (16)	21
5	(Ukraine) Serhii Rebrov	1992 – 2010	Shakhtar (1), Dynamo (19)	20
5	(Ukraine) Andriy Yarmolenko	2007 – 2017	Dynamo	20
7	(Ukraine) Andriy Pokladok	1992 – 2008	Karpaty (15), Metalurh D (2), Rava (1), Halychyna L (1)	19
8	(Ukraine) Oleh Matveyev	1992 – 2003	Shakhtar (16), Metalurh Z (1)	17
9	(Ukraine) Oleksiy Antiukhin	1992 – 2001	Metalurh Z (1), Tavria (13), Vorskla (2)	16
9	(Brazil) Luiz Adriano	2007 – 2015	Shakhtar	16
11	(Ukraine) Valentyn Poltavets	1993 – 2013	Shakhtar Pavlohrad (1), Metalurh Z (8), Dnipro (1), Chornomorets (1), Dniester (4)	15
11	(Ukraine) Bohdan Yesyp	1996 – 2014	Dynamo-3 (4), Zirka (1), Zakarpattia (3), Naftovyk (7)	15
11	(Ukraine) Oleh Husiev	2003 – 2016	Arsenal (1), Dynamo (14)	15
The table includes players who scored over 15 goals in the competition. Players who share number of tallies placed in order of seniority by years and then alphabetical order. As of 15 May 2025.

Seasonal top scorers
Year	Top Scorer(s)	Goals
1992	(Ukraine) Oleksandr Zayets (Torpedo)	6
1993	(Ukraine) Vitaliy Parakhnevych (Odesa)	8
1994	(Ukraine) Oleksiy Antiukhin (Tavria) (Ukraine) Eduard Valenko (Lviv, Karpaty)	5
1995	(Ukraine) Andriy Shevchenko (Dynamo-2, Dynamo)	6
1996	(Ukraine) Oleksandr Palyanytsia (Dnipro) (Ukraine) Oleksandr Ihnatyev (Nyva M) (Ukraine) Oleksandr Perenchuk (Nyva M)	4
1997	(Ukraine) Yakiv Kripak (Metalurh Z)	5
1998	(Ukraine) Andriy Shevchenko (Dynamo)	8
1999	(Ukraine) Artem Lopatkin (Stal A) (Ukraine) Vyacheslav Tereshchenko (Odesa)	8
2000	(Ukraine) Valentyn Poltavets (Metalurh Z) (Uzbekistan) Maksim Shatskikh (Dynamo)	4
2001	(Ukraine) Andriy Vorobei (Shakhtar D)	6
2002	(Ukraine) Yevhen Arbuzov (Tytan A) (Ukraine) Andriy Vorobei (Shakhtar D) (Uzbekistan) Maksim Shatskikh (Dynamo)	5
2003	(Ukraine) Andriy Vorobei (Shakhtar D) (Uzbekistan) Maksim Shatskikh (Dynamo)	5
2004	(Ukraine) Oleksandr Kosyrin (Chornomorets)	5
2005	(Brazil) Diogo Rincón (Dynamo)	6
2006	(Brazil) Kléber (Dynamo)	5
2007	(Ukraine) Ruslan Levyha (Illichivets)	6
2008	(Belarus) Wladzimir Karytska (Chornomorets)	5

Seasonal top scorers
Year	Top Scorer(s)	Goals
2009	(Ukraine) Andriy Yarmolenko (Dynamo)	5
2010	(Ukraine) Oleksandr Kovpak (Tavriya)	5
2011	(Ukraine) Andriy Oliynyk (Karpaty Ya.)	5
2012	(Brazil) Maicon (Volyn)	5
2013	(Brazil) Luiz Adriano & Alex Teixeira (Shakhtar)	4
2014	(Croatia) Eduardo (Shakhtar)	4
2015	(Ukraine) Anton Kotlyar (Stal D)	5
2016	(Ukraine) Oleksandr Karavayev (Zorya) (Ukraine) Andriy Yarmolenko (Dynamo)	4
2017	(Ukraine) Andriy Yarmolenko (Dynamo)	3
2018	(Ukraine) Serhiy Kyslenko (Lviv)	5
2019	(Ukraine) Robert Hehedosh (Mynai)	4
2020	(Ukraine) Vladyslav Sharay (Alians)	4
2021	(Ukraine) Mykola Buy (Epitsentr) (Ukraine) Robert Hehedosh (Veres) (Ukraine) Artem Dovbyk (Dnipro-1)	4
2022	(Ukraine) Serhiy Kravchenko (Mykolaiv) (Ukraine) Stanislav Kulish (VPK-Ahro) (Ukraine) Danylo Kondrakov (Rukh)	3
2024	(Ukraine) Dmytro Kulyk (Kudrivka) (Ukraine) Andriy Shtohrin (Chornomorets)	4
2025	(Ukraine) Bohdan Orynchak (Probiy)	4
2026	(Nigeria) Peter Itodo (Metalist 1925 Kharkiv)	5
Data through 2015–16 season.

== Amateur clubs in the tournament ==
- 1992 – none
- 1992–93 – (24 winners of regional cups): Inturist Yalta (Crimea), Rotor Cherkasy (Cherkasy), Lada Chernivtsi (Chernivtsi), Hirnyk Pavlohrad (Dnipropetrovsk), Vuhlyk Bilozerske (Donetsk), Khutrovyk Tysmenytsia (Ivano-Frankivsk), Polihraftekhnika-2 Oleksandriya (Kirovohrad), Avanhard Lozova (Kharkiv), Tavriya Novotroitske (Kherson), Paperovyk Poninka (Khmelnytskyi), Dynamo-3 Kyiv (Kyiv), Zdvyzh Borodyanka (Kyiv), Sokil Lviv (Lviv), Olimpiya Yuzhnoukrainsk (Mykolaiv), Blaho Blahoyeve (Odesa), Lokomotyv Rivne (Rivne), Spartak Okhtyrka (Sumy), Ptakhivnyk Velyki Hayi (Ternopil), Podillia Kyrnasivka (Vinnytsia), Metalist Irshava (Zakarpattia), Orbita Zaporizhia (Zaporizhia), Keramik Baranivka (Zhytomyr)
- 1993–94 – (19 regional cups): Khimik Cherkasy (Cherkasy), Karpaty Chernivtsi (Chernivtsi), Metalurh Novomoskovsk (Dnipropetrovsk), Hirnyk Khartsyzk (Donetsk), Pokuttia Kolomyia (Ivano-Frankivsk), Avanhard Lozova (2, Kharkiv), Dynamo Vysokopillia (Kherson), Avis Khmelnytskyi (Khmelnytskyi), Avanhard Rovenky (Luhansk), Khimik Sokal (Lviv), Evis-2 Mykolaiv (Mykolaiv), Blaho Blahoyeve (2, Odesa), Sula Lubny (Poltava), Spartak Okhtyrka (2, Sumy), Nyva Terebovlia (Ternopil), Intehral Vinnytsia (Vinnytsia), Pidshypnyk Lutsk (Volyn), Khimik Velykyi Bychkiv (Zakarpattia), Krok Zhytomyr (Zhytomyr)
- 1994–95 – (23 regional cups): Chaika Okhotnykove (Crimea), Lokomtyv Smila (Cherkasy), Karpaty Chernivtsi (2, Chernivtsi), Metalurh Kryvyi Rih (Dnipropetrovsk), Beskid Nadvirna (Ivano-Frankivsk), Avanhard Merefa (Kharkiv), Kharchovyk Bilozerka (Kherson), Enerhetyk Netishyn (Khmelnytskyi), Lokomotyv Znamianka (Kirovohrad), Obolon-Zmina Kyiv (Kyiv), Kolos Karapyshi (Kyiv), Batkivshchyna Pervomaisk (Luhansk), Sokil Zolochiv (Lviv), Nyva Nechayane (Mykolaiv), Pervomayets Pershotravneve (Odesa), Krystal Dubno (Rivne), Lokomotyv Konotop (Sumy), Sokil Velyki Hayi (2, Ternopil), Khimik-Nyva-2 Vinnytsia (Vinnytsia), Pidshypnyk Lutsk (2, Volyn), Baktyanets Badalove (Zakarpattia), Nyva-Viktor Novomykolaivka (Zaporizhia), Krok Zhytomyr (2, Zhytomyr)
- 1995–96 – (26 regional cups): Metalurh Kerch (Crimea), Lokomotyv Smila (2, Cherkasy), Fakel Varva (Chernihiv), Pidhirya Storozhynets (Chernivtsi), Druzhba Mahdalynivka (Dnipropetrovsk), Kolos Amvrosiyivskyi Raion (Donetsk), Pokuttia Kolomyia (2, Ivano-Frankivsk), Krystal Parkhomivka (Kharkiv), Enerhiya Nova Kakhovka (Kherson), Impuls Kamianets-Podilskyi (Khmelnytskyi), Burevisnyk-Elbrus Kirovohrad (Kirovohrad), Dynamo-3 Kyiv (2, Kyiv), Kolos Karapyshi (2, Kyiv), Batkivshchyna-Almar Pervomaisk (2, Luhansk), Promin Sambor (Lviv), Artaniya Ochakiv (Mykolaiv), Rybalka Odesa (Odesa), Velta Poltava (Poltava), Ekoservis Rivne (Rivne), Frunzenets Sumy (Sumy), Nyva Terebovlia (2, Ternopil), Khimik Vinnytsia (Vinnytsia), Yavir Tsuman (Volyn), Lisnyk Perechyn (Zakarpattia), Dyzelist Tokmak (Zaporizhia), Paperovyk Malyn (Zhytomyr)
- 1996–97 – none
- 1997–98 – Domobudivnyk Chernihiv
- 1998–99 – Zorya Khorostkiv
- 1999–00 – none
- 2000–01 – none
- 2001–02 – none
- 2002–03 – none
- 2003–04 – none
- 2004–05 – none
- 2005–06 – none
- 2006–07 – Khimmash Korosten
- 2007–08 – Halychyna Lviv
- 2008–09 – Yednist-2 Plysky
- 2009–10 – Irpin Horenychi
- 2010–11 – Karpaty Yaremche
- 2011–12 – Beregvidek Berehove, Slovkhlib Sloviansk
- 2012–13 – FC Bucha, Hvardiyets Hvardiyske
- 2013–14 – Nove Zhyttia Andriyivka, ODEK Orzhiv
- 2014–15 – Yednist Plysky, Chaika Petropavlivska Borshchahivka
- 2015–16 – SCC Demnia, Balkany Zorya
- 2016–17 – Ahrobiznes TSK Romny, Hirnyk Sosnivka
- 2017–18 – SCC Demnia (2), Chaika Petropavlivska Borshchahivka (2)
- 2018–19 – Viktoriya Mykolaivka, LNZ Lebedyn
- 2019–20 – Avanhard Bziv, FC Vovchansk
- 2020–21 – Viktoriya Mykolaivka (2), Olimpiya Savyntsi
- 2021–22 – Feniks Pidmonastyr, Olimpiya Savyntsi (2)
- 2023–24 – FC Mykolaiv, Olimpiya Savyntsi (3), Fazenda Chernivtsi, Shturm Ivankiv
- 2024–25 – FC Mykolaiv (2), Olimpiya Savyntsi (4)
- 2025–26 – (5 AAFU representatives): Ahrotekh Tyshkivka, Mayak Sarny, Kormil Yavoriv, Denhoff Denykhivka, Avanhard Lozova (3), and (16 regional cups representatives): Karbon Cherkasy (Cherkasy), Fazenda Chernivtsi (2, Chernivtsi), Naftovyk Dolyna (9, Ivano-Frankivsk), Nika SMK Bohodukhiv (Kharkiv), Kolos Polonne (Khmelnytskyi), FC Novoukrainka (Kirovohrad), Lehiya Kyiv (Kyiv), Polissya Stavky (Kyiv), Hirnyk Novoyavorivsk (Lviv), Palmira Odesa (3, Odesa), Olympiya Savyntsi (5, Poltava), Ahron Velyki Hayi (Ternopil), LSTM 536 Lutsk (Volyn), Medeya - Nevetskyi zamok (Zakarpattia), IRON Zaporizhia (Zaporizhia), Korosten/Ahro-Nyva (Zhytomyr)
- 2026–27 – (6 AAFU representatives): Mayak Sarny, Olympiya Savyntsi (6), FC Vilkhivtsi, Ahrotekh Tyshkivka (2), To4ka Odesa, FC Rokyta, and (18 regional cups representatives): Bazys Kochubiyivka (Cherkasy), Druzhba-Kozaky Nizhyn (Chernihiv), Dovbush Chernivtsi (Chernivtsi), Ukrainian Team Dnipro (Dnipropetrovsk), Pokuttia Kolomyia (3, Ivano-Frankivsk), Kolos Polonne (2, Khmelnytskyi), Inhul Pervozvanivka (Kirovohrad), Chaika Vyshhorod (Kyiv), FC Kalynivka (Kyiv), FC Mykolaiv (3, Lviv), Palmira Odesa (4, Odesa), FC Reshetylivka (Poltava), FC Novozhukiv (Rivne), Ahron Velyki Hayi (2, Ternopil), LSTM 536 Lutsk (2, Volyn), IRON Zaporizhia (2, Zaporizhia), VIVAD Romaniv (Zhytomyr), FC Novyi Rozdil (extra quote)

== Participated teams by regions ==
=== Main tournament ===
Region	Teams
Crimea (14)	Tavriya Simferopol (1992–2013/14, 2017/18–2021/22 {28}), Tytan Armyansk (1992/93–1998/99, 2000/01–2013/14 {21}), Inturist Yalta (1992/93 {1}), Portovyk [:Voikovets, Metalurh, Okean] Kerch (1993/94–1996/97 {4}), Dynamo Saky (1993/94–1996/97 {4}), Chaika Okhotnykove (1994/95 {1}), Metalurh Kerch (1995/96 {1}), [:Dynamo-]Ihroservis Simferopol (2002/03–2008/09 {7}), Krymteplytsia Molodizhne (2003/04–2012/13 {10}), Khimik Krasnoperekopsk (2005/06–2007/08 {3}), Yalos Yalta (2005/06 {1}), Feniks-Illichovets Kalinino (2006/07–2010/11 {5}), Zhemchuzhyna Yalta (2012/13 {1}), Hvardiyets Hvardiyske (2012/13 {1})
Cherkasy Oblast (8)	Dnipro [:FC Cherkasy] Cherkasy (1992–2001/02, 2003/04–2008/09, 2020/21, 2021/22 {19}), Rotor Cherkasy (1992/93 {1}), Khimik Cherkasy (1993/94 {1}), Lokomotyv Smila (1994/95–1998/99 {5}), Cherkashchyna [:Slavutych, Cherkaskyi Dnipro, -Akademia Bilozirya] Cherkasy (2011/12–2020/21 {10}), LNZ [:-Lebedyn] Cherkasy (2018/19, 2021/22, 2023/24–2026/27 {6}), Carbon Cherkasy (2025/26, 2026/27 {2}), Bazys Kochubiyivka (2026/27 {1})
Chernihiv Oblast (9)	Desna Chernihiv (1992–1998/99, 2001/02–2021/22 {29}), Fakel Varva (1995/96–1997/98 {3}), Domobudivnyk Chernihiv (1997/98 {1}), Avers Bakhmach (1997/98 {1}), Yednist Plysky (2005/06–2010/11, 2012/13, 2014/15 {8}), Yednist-2 Plysky (2008/09 {1}), FC Chernihiv (2020/21, 2021/22, 2023/24–2026/27 {6}), FC Kudrivka (2023/24–2026/27 {4}), Druzhba-Kozaky Nizhyn (2026/27 {1})
Chernivtsi Oblast (6)	Bukovyna Chernivtsi (1992–1998/99, 2000/01–2006/07, 2008/09–2021/22, 2023/24–2026/27 {33}), Lada Chernivtsi (1992/93, 1994/95 {2}), Karpaty Chernivtsi (1993/94, 1994/95 {2}), Pidhirya Storozhynets (1995/96 {1}), Fazenda Chernivtsi (2023/24, 2025/26 {2}), Dovbush Chernivtsi (2026/27 {1})
Dnipropetrovsk Oblast (23)	FC Dnipro (1992–2017/18 {27}), Kryvbas Kryvyi Rih (1992, 1992/93, 1994/95–2012/13, 2018/19–2021/22, 2023/24–2026/27 {28}), Elektrometalurh-NZF [:Kolos, Metalurh] Nikopol (1992–2004/05 {14}), Kosmos [:Shakhtar] Pavlohrad (1992–1995/96 {5}), Hirnyk Pavlohrad (1992/93 {1}), Metalurh Novomoskovsk (1993/94–1998/99 {6}), Sirius Zhovti Vody (1994/95 {1}), Metalurh Kryvyi Rih (1994/95 {1}), Druzhba Mahdalynivka (1995/96 {1}), Sportinvest Kryvyi Rih (1995/96 {1}), Prometei Dniprodzerzhysnk (1995/96 {1}), Dnipro-2 Dnipropetrovsk (1997/98 {1}), Kryvbas-2 Kryvyi Rih (1997/98 {1}), Stal [:Dniprodzerzhynsk] Kamianske (2002/03–2017/18 {16}), Hirnyk Kryvyi Rih (2005/06, 2006/07, 2008/09–2015/16 {10}), Dnipro-75 Dnipropetrovsk (2008/09, 2009/10 {2}), FC Nikopol[:-NHPU] (2015/16–2021/22 {7}), Dnipro-1 (2017/18–2021/22, 2023/24 {6}), VPK-Ahro [:Mahdalynivka] Shevchenkivka (2019/20–2021/22 {3}), Peremoha Dnipro (2020/21, 2021/22 {2}), Skoruk Tomakivka (2021/22 {1}), Penuel Kryvyi Rih (2025/26, 2026/27 {2}), Ukrainian Team Dnipro (2026/27 {1})
Donetsk Oblast (22)	Shakhtar Donetsk (1992–2021/22, 2023/24–2026/27 {35}), [:Azovets, Metalurh, Illichivets] Mariupol (1992–2021/22 {31}), Shakhtar [:Bazhanovets] Makiivka (1992/93–1998/99 {7}), Shakhtar-2 Donetsk [:Harant, Metalurh Kostiantynivka] (1992/93–1997/98 {6}), Vuhlyk Bilozerske (1992/93 {1}), Hirnyk Khartsyzk (1993/94 {1}), Shakhtar [:Medita] Shakhtarsk (1994/95, 1995/96 {2}), Shakhtar Horlivka (1994/95 {1}), Dynamo Sloviansk (1995/96 {1}), Kolos Amvrosiyevskyi Raion (1995/96 {1}), Metalurh Donetsk (1996/97–2014/15 {19}), Pivdenstal Yenakieve (1997/98 {1}), Metalurh Komsomolske (1997/98 {1}), Metalurh-2 Donetsk (1997/98 {1}), Mashynobudivnyk Druzhkivka (2000/01, 2001/02 {2}), Vuhlyk Dymytrov (2002/03–2004/05 {3}), Olimpik Donetsk (2005/06–2021/22 {17}), Tytan Donetsk (2008/09 {1}), [:Avanhard] Kramatorsk (2011/12–2013/14, 2015/16–2021/22 {10}), Makiivvuhillia Makiivka (2011/12–2013/14 {3}), Slovkhlib Sloviansk (2011/12 {1}), Feniks-[:Yarud] Mariupol (2020/21, 2021/22, 2023/24–2026/27 {6})
Ivano-Frankivsk Oblast (16)	Spartak [:Prykarpattia] Ivano-Frankivsk (1992–2006/07 {16}), [:Khutrovyk] Tysmenytisa (1992/93–1997/98 {6}), Pokuttia Kolomyia (1993/94, 1995/96–1997/98, 2026/27 {5}), Beskyd Nadvirna (1994/95 {1}), [:Khimik, Lukor] Kalush (1995/96–1997/98, 2001/02, 2002/03, 2018/19, 2019/20 {7}), Naftovyk Dolyna (1997/98, 1998/99, 2001/02–2006/07, 2025/26 {9}), Enerhetyk Burshtyn (2001/02–2011/12 {11}), Tekhno-Tsentr Rohatyn (2001/02–2004/05 {4}), Chornohora Ivano-Frankivsk (2002/03–2005/06 {4}), Prykarpattia [:Fakel] Ivano-Frankivsk (2004/05–2011/12 {8}), Karpaty Yaremche (2010/11 {1}), Prykarpattia[:-Teplovyk] Ivano-Frankivsk (2017/18–2021/22, 2023/24–2026/27 {9}), Karpaty Halych (2020/21, 2021/22 {2}), Probiy Horodenka (2024/25–2026/27 {3}), Revera 1908 Ivano-Frankivsk (2024/25 {1}), FC Vilkhivtsi (2026/27 {1})
Kharkiv Oblast (14)	Metalist [:Metal] Kharkiv (1992–2015/16, 2020/21, 2021/22, 2023/24–2026/27 {31}), Avanhard Lozova (1992/93, 1993/94, 2025/26, 2026/27 {4}), Oskil Kupyansk (1994/95–1998/99, 2001/02 {6}), Avanhard Merefa (1994/95, 1996/97 {2}), Krystal Parkhomivka (1995/96 {1}), Metalist-2 Kharkiv (1997/98 {1}), Arsenal Kharkiv (2001/02–2008/09 {8}), Kobra [:Helios] Kharkiv (2003/04–2018/19 {16}), Hazovyk Kharkiv (2003/04–2007/08 {5}), FC Kharkiv (2005/06–2009/10 {5}), Lokomotyv Dvorichna (2006/07 {1}), FC [:Metalist 1925] Kharkiv (2017/18–2021/22, 2023/24–2026/27 {9}), Vovchansk (2019/20, 2021/22 {2}), NIKA SMK Bohodukhiv (2025/26 {1})
Kherson Oblast (7)	Krystal [:Tavriya, Vodnyk] Kherson (1992–1999/00, 2001/02–2005/06, 2011/12–2016/17, 2018/19–2021/22 {24}), Meliorator Kakhovka (1992/93–1995/96 {4}), Tavriya Novotroitske (1992/93, 1994/95 {2}), Dynamo Vysokopillia (1993/94 {1}), Kharchovyk Bilozerka (1994/95 {1}), Enerhiya Nova Kakhovka (1995/96, 2010/11–2021/22 {13}), Myr Hornostayivka (2011/12–2013/14, 2015/16–2018/19 {7})
Khmelnytskyi Oblast (10)	Podillia [:Dynamo] Khmelnytskyi (1992–1998/99, 2001/02–2013/14, 2016/17–2021/22, 2023/24–2026/27 {31}), Temp-Advis [:Shepetivka] Khmelnytskyi (1992–1995/96 {5}), Paperovyk Poninka (1992/93 {1}), Temp-Advis-2 Shepetivka [:Advis Khmelnytskyi] (1993/94–1995/96 {3}), Enerhetyk Netishyn (1994/95 {1}), Impuls Kamianets-Podilskyi (1995/96 {1}), Krasyliv (2001/02–2003/04 {3}), Ahorbiznes Volochysk (2017/18–2021/22, 2023/24–2026/27 {9}), Epitsentr [:Dunaivtsi] Kamianets-Podilskyi (2020/21, 2021/22, 2023/24–2026/27 {6}), Kolos Polonne (2025/26, 2026/27 {2})
Kirovohrad Oblast (13)	[:Polihraftekhnika] Oleksandriya (1992–2002/03, 2004/05–2021/22, 2023/24–2026/27 {34}), Zirka [:Kirovohrad] Kropyvnytskyi (1992/93–2005/06, 2008/09–2018/19 {25}), Polihraftekhnika-2 Oleksandriya (1992/93 {1}), Lokomotyv Znamianka (1994/95 {1}), Burevisnyk-Elbrus Kirovohrad (1995/96 {1}), Zirka-2 Kirovohrad (1997/98 {1}), MFC Oleksandriya (2004/05, 2005/06 {2}), Olimpik Kirovohrad (2007/08 {1}), UkrAhroKom Holovkivka (2011/12–2013/14 {3}), Inhulets Petrove (2015/16–2021/22, 2023/24–2026/27 {11}), FC Novoukrayinka (2025/26 {1}), Ahrotekh Tyshkivka (2025/26, 2026/27 {2}), Inhul Pervozvanivka (2026/27 {1})
Kyiv City (15)	Dynamo (1992–2021/22, 2023/24–2026/27 {35}), CSKA [:SKA, ZS-Oriana, CSKA-2] (1992, 1992/93, 1994/95–1997/98, 2002/03–2009/10 {14}), Dynamo-2 (1992/93–1998/99 {7}), Dynamo-3 (1992/93, 1995/96, 1997/98, 1998/99 {4}), Arsenal [:-Nyva, -Borysfen, CSKA] Kyiv/Boryspil (1993/94–2013/14, 2015/16–2019/20 {26}), Obolon[-Zmina, -PPO] (1994/95–1999/00, 2001/02–2012/13 {18}), Obolon[:-Brovar] (2013/14–2021/22, 2023/24–2026/27 {13}), Rubikon (2020/21, 2021/22 {2}), Livyi Bereh (2021/22, 2023/24–2026/27 {5}), AFSC (2021/22 {1}), Lokomotyv (2023/24–2026/27 {4}), Lehiya (2025/26 {1}), Atlet (2025/26, 2026/27 {2}), Rebel (2025/26, 2026/27 {2}), Chaika Vyshhorod (2026/27 {1})
Kyiv Oblast (26)	Ros [:Ryhonda, -Transimpeks] Bila Tserkva (1992–1997/98, 2001/02–2005/06, 2008/09–2010/11 {15}), Osvita [:Zdvyzh, Systema-Boreks] Borodianka (1992/93, 1994/95–1998/99, 2001/02–2005/06 {11}), Kolos [:Nyva] Karapyshi (1993/94–1995/96 {3}), Nyva Myronivka (1994/95, 1995/96 {2}), Transimpeks Vyshneve (1994/95 {1}), Nerefa [:Skhid] Slavutych (1995/96–1997/98 {3}), Borysfen Boryspil (1997/98, 1999/00–2006/07 {9}), Nafkom-Akademia [:Irpin] Brovary (2002/03–2008/09 {7}), Knyazha Shchaslyve (2005/06–2008/09 {4}), Inter Boyarka (2006/07 {1}), Arsenal-Kyivshchyna Bila Tserkva (2008/09–2017/18 {10}), Irpin Horenychi (2009/10 {1}), FC Bucha (2012/13 {1}), Chaika Petropavlivska Borshchahivka (2014/15, 2017/18–2021/22, 2023/24–2025/26 {9}), Kolos Kovalivka (2015/16–2021/22, 2023/24–2026/27 {11}), Dinaz Vyshhorod (2019/20–2021/22, 2023/24–2026/27 {7}), Avanhard Bziv (2019/20 {1}), Lyubomyr Stavyshche (2021/22 {1}), UCSA Tarasivka (2023/24–2026/27 {4}), Nyva Buzova (2023/24 {1}), Druzhba Myrivka (2023/24 {1}), Shturm Ivankiv (2023/24 {1}), Polissya Stavky Piskivka (2025/26 {1}), Denhoff Denykhivka (2025/26 {1}), FC Lisne (2025/26 {1}), FC Kalynivka (2026/27 {1})
Lviv Oblast (28)	Karpaty Lviv (1992–2021/22, 2023/24–2026/27 {35}), Halychyna Drohobych (1992–1998/99, 2001/02, 2002/03 {10}), [Hazovyk-]Skala 1911 Stryi (1992–1995/96, 2001/02–2005/06, 2023/24–2026/27 {14}), Hazovyk Komarne (1992/93, 1994/95–1998/99 {6}), Sokil-LORTA Lviv (1992/93 {1}), FC Lviv (1993/94–2001/02 {9}), Khimik Sokal (1993/94 {1}), Sokil Zolochiv (1994/95, 2000/01–2002/03 {4}), Avanhard Zhydachiv (1994/95, 1995/96 {2}), Skify (:LAZ) Lviv (1994/95, 1995/96 {2}), Haray Zhovkva (1995/96–1997/98 {3}), Promin Sambor (1995/96 {1}), Tsementnyk[:-Khorda] Mykolaiv (1997/98, 1998/99, 2001/02 {3}), Karpaty-2 Lviv (1997/98 {1}), Dynamo Lviv (2001/02 {1}), Rava Rava-Ruska (2003/04–2005/06 {3}), FC Lviv (2006/07–2012/13, 2017/18–2021/22 {12}), Halychyna Lviv (2007/08 {1}), Skala Stryi [:Morshyn] (2009/10–2017/18 {9}), SCC Demnya (2015/16, 2017/18 {2}), Rukh [:Vynnyky] Lviv (2016/17–2021/22, 2023/24–2026/27 {10}), Hirnyk Sosnivka (2016/17 {1}), Feniks Pidmonastyr (2021/22 {1}), FC Mykolaiv (2023/24, 2024/25, 2026/27 {3}), Kulykiv-Bilka (2024/25–2026/27 {3}), Hirnyk Novoyavorivsk (2025/26 {1}), Kormil Yavoriv (2025/26 {1}), FC Novyi Rozdil (2026/27 {1})
Luhansk Oblast (11)	Stal Alchevsk (1992–2014/15 {24}), Zorya[-MALS] Luhansk (1992–1998/99, 2001/02–2021/22, 2023/24–2026/27 {33}), Shakhtar (:Vahonobudivnyk) Stakhanov (1992–1998/99 {8}), Khimik Severodonetsk (1992–1997/98 {7}), Dynamo Luhansk (1992/93–1994/95 {3}), Avanhard Rovenky (1993/94–1998/99, 2001/02–2003/04 {9}), Batkivshchyna Pervomaisk (1994/95, 1995/96 {2}), Shakhtar Sverdlovsk (1995/96, 2007/08–2013/14 {8}), Shakhtar Luhansk (2002/03 {1}), Molniya Severodonetsk (2005/06 {1}), Komunalnyk Luhansk (2007/08, 2008/09 {2})
Mykolaiv Oblast (9)	[:Sudnobudivnyk, Evis] Mykolaiv (1992–2007/08, 2009/10–2021/22 {30}), Artania Ochakiv (1992–1995/96 {5}), Enerhiya [:Olimpiya] Yuzhnoukrainsk (1992/93, 1995/96–1998/99, 2001/02–2005/06, 2007/08 {11}), Evis-2 Mykolaiv (1993/94 {1}), Nyva Nechayane (1994/95 {1}), Vodnyk Mykolaiv (2003/04 {1}), Enerhiya Mykolaiv (2013/14 {1}), Sudnobudivnyk Mykolaiv (2017/18 {1}), Vast Mykolaiv (2023/24 {1})
Odesa Oblast (20)	Chornomorets Odesa (1992–2021/22, 2023/24–2026/27 {35}), SC [:SKA] Odesa (1992–1998/99 {8}), Chornomorets-2 Odesa (1992/93–1994/95 {3}), Blaho Blahoyeve (1992/93, 1993/94 {2}), Dnistrovets Bilhorod-Dnistrovskyi (1994/95, 1995/96 {2}), Pervomayets Pershotraveneve (1994/95 {1}), Portovyk Illichivsk (1995/96–1998/99, 2001/02 {5}), Dynamo[:-Flesh, -SKA] Odesa (1995/96, 1997/98, 1998/99 {3}), Rybak Odesa (1995/96 {1}), SKA-Lotto Odesa (1997/98 {1}), FC Odesa [:Dnister Ovidiopol] (2002/03–2012/13 {11}), Palmira Odesa (2003/04, 2004/05, 2025/26, 2026/27 {4}), Real Odesa (2004/05 {1}), Bastion Illichivsk (2008/09–2012/13 {5}), Real Pharma [:Yuzhne, Ovidiopol] Odesa (2011/12–2021/22, 2023/24–2025/26 {14}), SKAD-Yalpuh Bolhrad (2011/12 {1}), SKA Odesa (2012/13 {1}), Balkany Zorya (2015/16–2021/22 {7}), Zhemchuzhyna Odesa (2016/17, 2017/18 {2}), To4ka Odesa (2026/27 {1})
Poltava Oblast (17)	Vorskla Poltava (1992–2021/22, 2023/24–2025/26 {34}), Kremin Kremenchuk (1992–1998/99, 2005/06–2021/22, 2023/24, 2024/25 {27}), Naftokhimik Kremenchuk (1992/93–1995/96 {4}), Sula Lubny (1993/94, 1994/95 {2}), Vahonobudivnyk Kremenchuk (1994/95, 1995/96 {2}), Velta Poltava (1995/96 {1}), Hirnyk-Sport [:Komsomolsk] Horishni Plavni (1996/97–1998/99, 2001/02–2021/22, 2023/24–2025/26 {27}), [:Petrivtsi] Myrhorod (1996/97–1998/99 {3}), Vorskla-2 Poltava (1997/98 {1}), Adoms Kremenchuk (2001/02 {1}), FC Poltava (2008/09–2017/18 {10}), FC Karlivka (2013/14 {1}), Nove Zhyttia Andriivka (2013/14 {1}), Olimpiya Savyntsi (2020/21, 2021/22, 2023/24–2026/27 {6}), SC Poltava (2021/22, 2023/24–2026/27 {5}), FC Rokyta (2026/27 {1}), FC Reshetylivka (2026/27 {1})
Rivne Oblast (8)	Veres Rivne (1992–1998/99, 2001/02–2006/07, 2008/09–2010/11, 2015/16–2021/22, 2023/24–2026/27 {28}), Lokomotyv Rivne (1992/93 {1}), Krystal Dubno (1994/95 {1}), EKO-Servis Rivne (1995/96 {1}), Ikva Mlyniv (2003/04 {1}), ODEK Orzhiv (2013/14 {1}), Mayak Sarny (2025/26, 2026/27 {2}), FC Novozhukiv (2026/27 {1})
Sevastopol (3)	Chaika Sevastopol (1992–1995/96 {5}), Chernomorets Sevastopol (1997/98, 1998/99 {2}), PFC Sevastopol (2002/03–2013/14 {12})
Sumy Oblast (15)	Naftovyk Okhtyrka (1992–1999/00, 2001/02–2018/19 {27}), SBTS (:Avtomobilist) Sumy (1992–1995/96 {5}), Spartak Sumy [Yavir (:-Sumy) Krasnopillia] (1992/93–2006/07 {15}), Spartak Okhtyrka (1992/93, 1993/94 {2}), Lokomotyv Konotop (1994/95 {1}), Frunzenets[:-Liha-99] Sumy (1995/96, 2001/02 {2}), Elektron Romny (1997/98, 1998/99, 2001/02–2003/04 {5}), Slovianets Konotop (1997/98 {1}), PFC Sumy [:Yavir Krasnopillia] (2002/03–2006/07, 2008/09–2018/19 {16}), Barsa Sumy (2015/16 {1}), Ahrobiznes TSK Romny (2016/17 {1}), Viktoriya [:Mykolaivka] Sumy (2018/19, 2020/21, 2021/22, 2023/24–2026/27 {7}), Alians Lypova Dolyna (2019/20–2021/22 {3}), FC Sumy (2021/22 {1}), FC Trostianets (2021/22, 2023/24–2026/27 {5})
Ternopil Oblast (9)	Nyva Ternopil (1992–2015/16, 2017/18–2021/22, 2023/24–2026/27 {34}), Krystal Chortkiv (1992–1998/99 {8}), Dnister Zalishchyky (1992/93–1994/95, 2026/27 {4}), Sokil [:Ptakhivnyk] Velyki Hayi (1992/93, 1994/95 {2}), Nyva Terebovlya (1993/94, 1995/96 {2}), Zorya Khorostkiv (1998/99 {1}), Sokil Berezhany (2005/06 {1}), FC Ternopil (2012/13–2017/18 {6}), Ahron Velyki Hayi (2025/26, 2026/27 {2})
Vinnytsia Oblast (7)	Nyva[:-V] Vinnytsia (1992–2004/05, 2008/09–2011/12, 2016/17–2021/22, 2023/24–2026/27 {28}), Podillia Kyrnasivka (1992/93 {1}), Intehral Vinnytsia (1993/94 {1}), Khimik[-Nyva-2] Vinnytsia (1994/95, 1995/96 {2}), [:Nyva] Bershad (1996/97, 1997/98, 2004/05, 2005/06 {4}), Fortuna Sharhorod (1997/98 {1}), Bratslav Vinnytsia (2026/27 {1})
Volyn Oblast (5)	Volyn[:-1] Lutsk (1992–2021/22 {31}), Pidshypnyk Lutsk (1993/94, 1994/95 {2}), Yavir Tsuman (1995/96 {1}), Kovel-Volyn-2 (2002/03 {1}), LSTM 536 Lutsk (2025/26, 2026/27 {2})
Zakarpattia Oblast (14)	Hoverla [:Verkhovyna, Zakarpattia] Uzhhorod (1992–2015/16 {25}), Karpaty [:Pryladyst] Mukachevo (1992–1997/98 {7}), Metalist Irshava (1992/93 {1}), Khimik Velykyi Bychkiv (1993/94 {1}), Baktyanets Badalove (1994/95 {1}), Fetrovyk Khust (1994/95 {1}), Lisnyk Perechyn (1995/96 {1}), Berehvydeyk Berehove (2011/12 {1}), FC Mynai (2018/19–2021/22, 2023/24, 2024/25 {6}), FC Uzhhorod (2019/20–2021/22, 2024/25, 2025/26 {5}), Munkacs Mukachevo (2021/22 {1}), FC Khust (2023/24, 2024/25 {2}), SC Vilkhivtsi (2024/25–2026/27 {3}), Medeya - Nevytskyi zamok Onokivtsi (2025/26 {1})
Zaporizhzhia Oblast (10)	Metalurh Zaporizhia (1992–2017/18 {27}), Torpedo Zaporizhia (1992–1999/00, 2002/03 {10}), Druzhba Berdiansk (1992/93–1995/96 {4}), Orbita Zaporizhia (1992/93 {1}), Olkom [:Torpedo] Melitopol (1993/94–1997/98, 2001/02–2010/11 {15}), Viktor Zaporizhia (1994/95–1998/99 {5}), Nyva-Viktor Novomykolaivka (1994/95 {1}), Dyzelist Tokmak (1995/96 {1}), Metalurh Zaporizhia (2018/19–2021/22, 2023/24–2026/27 {8}), IRON Zaporizhia (2025/26, 2026/27 {2})
Zhytomyr Oblast (12)	Polissia (:Khimik) Zhytomyr (1992–2004/05, 2017/18–2021/22, 2023/24–2026/27 {23}), Keramik Baranivka (1992/93–1996/97 {5}), Krok Zhytomyr (1993/94, 1994/95 {2}), Paperovyk Malyn (1995/96–1998/99 {4}), Systema-KKhP Chernyakhiv (2002/03 {1}), Zhytychi Zhytomyr (2005/06, 2011/12 {2}), MFC Zhytomyr (2005/06 {1}), Khimmash Korosten (2006/07 {1}), FC Korosten (2008/09 {1}), PFC Zviahel (2023/24 {1}), Korosten/Ahro-Nyva (2025/26 {1}), VIVAD Romaniv (2026/27 {1})

For previous seasons in the Soviet Union, see Football in Ukraine#Participated Ukrainian teams in the Soviet Cup by regions

=== Second League Cup ===
Region	Teams
Crimea	Tytan Armyansk (1999/00, 2000/01 {2}), Chernomorets Sevastopol (1999/00 {1})
Cherkasy Oblast	FC Cherkasy-2 (2000/01 {1})
Chernihiv Oblast	Desna Chernihiv (1999/00, 2000/01 {2})
Chernivtsi Oblast	Bukovyna Chernivtsi (1999/00 {1})
Dnipropetrovsk Oblast	Dnipro-2 Dnipropetrovsk (1999/00 {1}), Kryvbas-2 Kryvyi Rih (1999/00, 2000/01 {2}), Dnipro-3 Dnipropetrovsk (2000/01 {1})
Donetsk Oblast	Shakhtar Horlivka (1999/00 {1}), Mashynobudivnyk Druzhkivka (1999/00, 2000/01 {2}), Shakhtar-3 Donetsk (2000/01 {1}), Metalurh-2 Mariupol (2000/01 {1})
Ivano-Frankivsk Oblast	Naftovyk Dolyna (1999/00, 2000/01 {2}), Enerhetyk Burshtyn (1999/00, 2000/01 {2}), FC Kalush (1999/00, 2000/01 {2}), Prykarpattia-2 Ivano-Frankivsk (1999/00, 2000/01 {2}), Tekhno-Tsentr Rohatyn (2000/01 {1})
Kharkiv Oblast	Metalist-2 Kharkiv (1999/00, 2000/01 {2}), Arsenal Kharkiv (1999/00, 2000/01 {2}), Oskil Kupyansk (1999/00, 2000/01 {2})
Kherson Oblast	SC Kherson (1999/00, 2000/01 {2})
Khmelnytskyi Oblast	Podillia Khmelnytskyi (1999/00 {1}), Krasyliv (2000/01 {1})
Kyiv City	Dynamo-3 (1999/00, 2000/01 {2}), Obolon-PVO-2 (1999/00 {1}), Obolon-PVO (2000/01 {1})
Kyiv Oblast	Borysfen Boryspil (1999/00 {1}), System-Boreks Borodyanka (1999/00, 2000/01 {2}), Ryhonda Bila Tserkva (1999/00, 2000/01 {2})
Kirovohrad Oblast	Zirka-2 Kirovohrad (1999/00 {1})
Lviv Oblast	Dynamo Lviv (1999/00, 2000/01 {2}), Tsementnyk-Khorda Mykolaiv (1999/00, 2000/01 {2}), Hazovyk Komarno (1999/00, 2000/01 {2}), Halychyna Drohobych (1999/00, 2000/01 {2}), Karpaty-2 Lviv (1999/00, 2000/01 {2}), Sokil Zolochiv (2000/01 {1})
Luhansk Oblast	Zorya Luhansk (1999/00, 2000/01 {2}), Avanhard Rovenky (1999/00, 2000/01 {2}), Stal-2 Alchevsk (2000/01 {1})
Mykolaiv Oblast	Olimpiya Yuzhnoukrainsk (1999/00, 2000/01 {2})
Odesa Oblast	Portovyk Illichivsk (1999/00, 2000/01 {2}), Chornomorets-2 Odesa (2000/01 {1})
Poltava Oblast	Hirnyk-Sport Komsomolsk (1999/00, 2000/01 {2}), Kremin Kremenchuk (1999/00 {1}), Vorksla-2 Poltava (1999/00, 2000/01 {2}), Adoms Kremenchuk (1999/00, 2000/01 {2}), FC Myrhorod (1999/00 {1})
Rivne Oblast	Veres Rivne (1999/00, 2000/01 {2})
Sumy Oblast	Elektron Romy (1999/00 {1}), Frunzenets-Liha-99 Sumy (2000/01 {1})
Ternopil Oblast	Ternopil-Nyva-2 (2000/01 {1})
Vinnytsia Oblast	Nyva Vinnytsia (1999/00 {1})
Volyn Oblast	—
Zakarpattia Oblast	—
Zaporizhzhia Oblast	Viktor Zaporizhia (1999/00 {1}), Olkom [:Torpedo] Melitopol (1999/00, 2000/01 {2}), Metalurh-2 Zaporizhia (1999/00, 2000/01 {2}), Torpedo Zaporizhia (2000/01 {1})
Zhytomyr Oblast	Papirnyk Malyn (1999/00 {1}), Polissia Zhytomyr (2000/01 {1})

== See also ==
- Football in Ukraine
- Ukrainian Premier League
