= 1992–93 FC Bukovyna Chernivtsi season =

Bukovyna Chernivtsi
1992–93 season
- Vyshcha Liha: 12th

The 1992–93 season was FC Bukovyna Chernivtsi's 36th season in existence and the club's 2nd season in the top flight of Ukrainian football. In addition to the domestic league, Bukovyna Chernivtsi participated in that season's edition of the Ukrainian Cup. The season covers the period from 1 July 1992 to 30 June 1993.

== Players ==
=== First team squad ===
Squad at end of season

Note: Flags indicate national team as defined under FIFA eligibility rules; some limited exceptions apply. Players may hold more than one non-FIFA nationality.

No.	Pos.	Nation	Player
—	GK	(Ukraine) UKR	Volodymyr Tsytkin
—	DF	(Ukraine) UKR	Serhiy Sobotyuk
—	DF	(Ukraine) UKR	Oleksandr Voytyuk
—	DF	(Russia) RUS	Vitali Markov
—	DF	(Ukraine) UKR	Ivan Rusnak
—	MF	(Ukraine) UKR	Leonid Fedorov
—	MF	(Ukraine) UKR	Viktor Budnyk
—	FW	(Ukraine) UKR	Roman Laba
—	DF	(Ukraine) UKR	Asan Mustafayev
—	FW	(Ukraine) UKR	Borys Finkel
—	FW	(Ukraine) UKR	Pavlo Irichuk

No.	Pos.	Nation	Player
—	FW	(Russia) RUS	Valery Alistarov
—	FW	(Ukraine) UKR	Vasyl Bondarchuk
—	MF	(Ukraine) UKR	Dmytro Bidulka
—	GK	(Ukraine) UKR	Ihor Krapyvkin
—	FW	(Ukraine) UKR	Andriy Lutsiv
—	MF	(Ukraine) UKR	Vasyl Zadorozhnyak
—	MF	(Ukraine) UKR	Oleksandr Ivanov
—	MF	(Ukraine) UKR	Ivan Bubis
—		(Ukraine) UKR	Oleksandr Verenko
—	MF	(Ukraine) UKR	Yaroslav Voloshyn
—	MF	(Moldova) MDA	Vladimir Gaidamașciuc

=== Left club during season ===
Note: Flags indicate national team as defined under FIFA eligibility rules; some limited exceptions apply. Players may hold more than one non-FIFA nationality.

No. / Pos. / Nation / Player; — / / / (to)	No. / Pos. / Nation / Player; — / / / (to)
