= 1995–96 Ukrainian Cup =

1995—96 Ukrainian Cup
Kubok Ukrainy

Tournament details
- Country: Ukraine
- Dates: 1 August 1995 – 26 May 1996
- Teams: 110

Final positions
- Champions: Dynamo Kyiv (2nd title)
- Runners-up: Nyva Vinnytsia

Tournament statistics
- Top goal scorer: Oleksandr Palyanytsya (4)

The 1995–96 Ukrainian Cup was the fifth annual edition of Ukraine's football knockout competition, known as the Ukrainian Cup.

The Cup started with the round of 32, but it also had couple of preliminaries. This season two legs rounds were discontinued and all rounds consisted of only one game. Also the extra tier was merged with the Second League. The competition kicked off on 1 August 1995 with 24 games. Five games were announced as a forfeit on 1 August, while one more on 1 October 1995.

The cup holder Shakhtar Donetsk was eliminated in away game against Nyva Vinnytsia on penalties in semifinals.

== Team allocation ==
One hundred ten teams entered the competition.

=== Distribution ===
| | Teams entering in this round | Teams advancing from previous round |
|---|---|---|
| 1st Qualifying round (60 teams) | 26 winners of regional cup competitions; 34 participants of the Second League | |
| 2nd Qualifying round (64 teams) | 10 participants of the Second League; 22 participants of the First League; 2 participants of the Premier League (lower seeded) | 30 winners from the first qualifying round |
| 3rd Qualifying round (32 teams) | | 32 winners from the second qualifying round |
| Tournament proper (32 teams) | 16 participants of the Premier League (upper seeded) | 16 winners from the third qualifying round |

=== First qualifying round entrants ===
- 26 regional representatives
- 34 Second League (Avanhard-Industria Rovenky, Avanhard Zhydachiv, Azovets Mariupol, Chaika Sevastopol, CSKA Kyiv, Dnistrovets Bilhorod-Dnistrovskyi, Druzhba Berdiansk, Dynamo-Flesh Odesa, Dynamo Sloviansk, Harai Zhovkva, Keramik Baranivka, Khimik Kalush, Khutrovyk Tysmenytsia, Kosmos Pavlohrad, Meliorator Kakhovka, Metalurh Novomoskovsk, Nyva Myronivka, Obolon Kyiv, Olimpia Yuzhnoukrainsk, Oskil Kupiansk, Portovyk Illichivsk, Prometei Dniprodzerzhynsk, Ros-Transimpeks Bila Tserkva, Shakhtar Stakhanov, Shakhtar-2 Donetsk, Skhid Slavutych, Skify Lviv, Sportinvest Kryivyi Rih, Systema-Boreks Borodianka, Temp-Advis-2 Shepetivka, Torpedo Melitopol, Vahonobudivnyk Kremenchuk, Viktor Zaporizhzhia, Vodnyk Kherson)

=== Second qualifying round entrants ===
- 30 winners of the previous round
- 10 Second League (Avtomobilist Sumy, Desna Chernihiv, Dynamo Saky, Halychyna Drohobych, Hazovyk Komarne, Karpaty Mukacheve, Okean Kerch, Shakhtar Shakhtarsk, Shakhtar Sverdlovsk, Tytan Armiansk)
- 22 First League in whole
- 2 Top League (CSKA-Borysfen Kyiv, Zirka-NIBAS Kirovohrad)

== Competition schedule ==
=== First qualifying round ===
| Druzhba (Mahdalynivka) (AM) | 0:2 | (2L) Metalurh (Novomoskovsk) |
| Dynamo (Slovyansk) (2L) | 0:1 | (2L) Oskil (Kupyansk) | aet |
| Enerhiya (Nova Kakhovka) (AM) | 2:2 | (2L) Torpedo (Melitopol) | aet, pk 2:4 |
| Frunzenets (Sumy) (AM) | 1:0 | (2L) Kosmos (Pavlohrad) |
| Burevisnyk-Elbrus (Kirovohrad) (AM) | 1:2 | (2L) Dnistrovets (Bilhorod-Dnistrovskyi) |
| Velta (Poltava) (AM) | +:- | (2L) Viktor (Zaporizhzhia) | Viktor did not arrive |
| Krystal (Parkhomivka) (AM) | 1:0 | (2L) Sportinvest (Kryvyi Rih) |
| Lokomotyv (Smila) (AM) | 1:1 | (2L) Portovyk (Illichivsk) | aet, pk 5:6 |
| Druzhba (Berdiansk) (2L) | 2:0 | (2L) Azovets (Mariupol) | game was played at Druzhba Stadium in Osypenko (near Berdyansk) |
| Batkivschyna-Almar (Pervomayske) (AM) | 2:0 | (2L) Shakhtar (Stakhanov) | game was played at Shakhtar Stadium in settlement of Rorsi |
| Rybalka (Odesa) (AM) | 3:1 | (2L) Meliorator (Kakhovka) |
| Olimpiya (Yuzhnoukrainsk) (2L) | 1:1 | (2L) Vodnyk (Kherson) | aet, pk 4:3 |
| Kolos (Amvrosiyevka Raion) (AM) | -:+ | (2L) Shakhtar-2 (Donetsk) |
| Dyzelyst (Tokmak) (AM) | 0:1 | (2L) Avanhard-Industriya (Rovenky) |
| Metalurh (Kerch) (AM) | 3:5 | (2L) Chaika (Sevastopol) |
| EKO-Servis (Rivne) (AM) | 0:1 | (2L) Obolon (Kyiv) | game was played at Avanhard Stadium in Rivne |
| Impuls (Kamyanets-Podilskyi) (AM) | 0:1 | (2L) Keramik (Baranivka) |
| Pidhirya (Storozhynets) (AM) | +:- | (2L) Temp-Advis-2 (Shepetivka) | Temp did not arrive |
| Nyva (Terebovlia) (AM) | 1:0 | (2L) Skify (Lviv) |
| Promin (Sambor) (AM) | 0:0 | (2L) Khutrovyk (Tysmenytsia) | aet, pk 3:5, game was played at Dniester Stadium in Rudky (Lviv suburb) |
| Pokuttia (Kolomyia) (AM) | 2:0 | (2L) Avanhard (Zhydachiv) |
| Yavir (Tsuman) (AM) | 0:1 | (2L) Haray (Zhovkva) |
| Lisyvnyk (Perechyn) (AM) | 1:2 | (2L) Khimik (Kalush) | aet |
| Fakel (Varva) (AM) | 1:0 | (2L) Ros-Transimpeks (Bila Tserkva) |
| Vahonobudivnyk (Kremenchuk) (2L) | -:+ | (2L) Prometey (Dniprodzerzhynsk) | Vahonobudivnyk forfeited |
| Artania (Ochakiv) (AM) | -:+ | (2L) Dynamo-Flesh (Odesa) |
| Khimik (Vinnytsia) (AM) | -:+ | (2L) CSKA (Kyiv) | the score of 2:1 was annulled |
| Paperovyk (Malyn) (AM) | 1:1 | (2L) Systema-Borex (Borodianka) | aet, pk 6:5 |
| Dynamo-3 (Kyiv) (AM) | 1:2 | (2L) Nyva (Myronivka) | game was played at Lobanovsky Dynamo Stadium |
| Kolos (Karapyshi) (AM) | 2:2 | (2L) Skhid (Slavutych) | aet, pk 6:5 |

=== Second qualifying round ===
| Metalurh (Novomoskovsk) (2L) | 3:2 | (1L) Metalist (Kharkiv) |
| Oskil (Kupyansk) (2L) | 2:0 | (1L) Khimik (Severodonetsk) |
| Torpedo (Melitopol) (2L) | 0:1 | (PL) Zirka-NIBAS (Kirovohrad) |
| Frunzenets (Sumy) (AM) | 1:3 | (1L) Vorskla (Poltava) |
| Dnistrovets (Bilhorod-Dnistrovskyi) (2L) | 1:3 | (1L) Naftokhimik (Kremenchuk) | game was played at the local Sports School stadium |
| Velta (Poltava) (AM) | -:+ | (1L) Polihraftekhnika (Olexandria) | Velta forfeited |
| Krystal (Parkhomivka) (AM) | 0:0 | (1L) Yavir (Krasnopilya) | aet, pk 2:4 |
| Portovyk (Illichivsk) (2L) | 1:0 | (1L) Naftovyk (Okhtyrka) | aet |
| Druzhba (Berdiansk) (2L) | 0:3 | (1L) Stal (Alchevsk) |
| Batkivschyna-Almar (Pervomayske) (AM) | 1:2 | (1L) Shakhtar (Makiivka) | game was played at Hirne Stadium in Hirne |
| Rybalka (Odesa) (AM) | 1:2 | (1L) Metalurh (Nikopol) | aet |
| Olimpiya (Yuzhnoukrainsk) (2L) | 0:1 | (1L) Odesa |
| Shakhtar-2 (Donetsk) (2L) | 3:0 | (2L) Shakhtar (Sverdlovsk) | game was played at Metalurh Stadium in Komsomolske |
| Avanhard-Industriya (Rovenky) (2L) | 2:0 | (2L) Shakhtar (Shakhtarsk) | aet |
| Chaika (Sevastopol) (2L) | 2:0 | (2L) Tytan (Armyansk) |
| Dynamo (Saky) (2L) | +:- | (2L) Okean (Kerch) | Okean forfeited |
| Obolon (Kyiv) (2L) | 0:2 | (2L) Hazovyk (Komarno) | game was played at Bilshovyk Stadium of the Bilshovyk machine building factory in Kyiv |
| Keramik (Baranivka) (2L) | 0:0 | (1L) Krystal (Chortkiv) | aet, pk 5:4 |
| Pidhirya (Storozhynets) (AM) | 0:1 | (2L) Halychyna (Drohobych) |
| Nyva (Terebovlia) (AM) | 2:1 | (1L) Bukovyna (Chernivtsi) |
| Khutrovyk (Tysmenytsia) (2L) | 4:2 | (2L) Karpaty (Mukacheve) |
| Pokuttia (Kolomyia) (AM) | 2:0 | (1L) Zakarpattia (Uzhhorod) |
| Haray (Zhovkva) (2L) | 2:0 | (1L) Skala (Stryi) | aet |
| Khimik (Kalush) (2L) | 1:0 | (1L) Lviv |
| Fakel (Varva) (AM) | 0:2 | (PL) CSKA-Borysfen (Kyiv) |
| Prometey (Dniprodzerzhynsk) (2L) | 0:0 | (1L) Dnipro (Cherkasy) | aet, pk 2:4 |
| Dynamo-Flesh (Odesa) (2L) | 1:5 | (1L) Dynamo-2 (Kyiv) | aet, game was played at Spartak Stadium in Odesa |
| Desna (Chernihiv) (2L) | 0:0 | (2L) Avtomobilist (Sumy) | aet, pk 5:4 |
| CSKA (Kyiv) (2L) | 0:0 | (1L) Podillya (Khmelnytskyi) | aet, pk 2:4, game was played at Kolos Stadium in Boryspil |
| Paperovyk (Malyn) (AM) | +:- | (1L) Veres (Rivne) | Veres forfeited |
| Nyva (Myronivka) (2L) | +:- | (1L) Temp-Advis (Khmelnytskyi) | Temp forfeited |
| Kolos (Karapyshi) (AM) | 1:0 | (1L) Khimik (Zhytomyr) | aet |

=== Third qualifying round ===
| Metalurh (Novomoskovsk) (2L) | 1:0 | (2L) Oskil (Kupyansk) |
| Vorskla (Poltava) (1L) | 2:3 | (PL) Zirka-NIBAS (Kirovohrad) |
| Naftokhimik (Kremenchuk) (1L) | 3:2 | (1L) Polihraftekhnika (Olexandria) |
| Yavir (Krasnopilya) (1L) | 4:1 | (2L) Portovyk (Illichivsk) |
| Stal (Alchevsk) (1L) | 2:1 | (1L) Bazhanovets (Makiivka) | aet |
| Odesa (1L) | 0:0 | (1L) Metalurh (Nikopol) | aet, pk 1:2 |
| Shakhtar-2 (Donetsk) (2L) | 5:0 | (2L) Avanhard-Industriya (Rovenky) | game was played at Metalurh Stadium in Komsomolske |
| Chaika (Sevastopol) (2L) | 2:0 | (2L) Dynamo Saky (Saky) |
| Hazovyk (Komarno) (2L) | 2:0 | (2L) Keramik (Baranivka) |
| Halychyna (Drohobych) (2L) | 3:1 | (AM) Nyva (Terebovlia) |
| Khutrovyk (Tysmenytsia) (2L) | 2:0 | (AM) Pokuttia (Kolomyia) |
| Haray (Zhovkva) (2L) | 1:0 | (2L) Khimik (Kalush) |
| Dnipro (Cherkasy) (1L) | 1:4 | (PL) CSKA-Borysfen (Kyiv) |
| Desna (Chernihiv) (2L) | 0:0 | (1L) Dynamo-2 (Kyiv) | aet, pk 5:6 |
| Paperovyk (Malyn) (AM) | 1:2 | (1L) Podillya (Khmelnytskyi) |
| Kolos (Karapyshi) (AM) | 0:6 | (2L) Nyva (Myronivka) |

=== First Elimination Round ===
1996-03-3
?:? LST

| FC Halychyna Drohobych (2L) | 0–0 (a.e.t.) | (PL) Kryvbas Kryvyi Rih |
|---|---|---|
| | Report |
Penalties
| | 6–5 |

Kranovyk Stadium, Drohobych
Attendance: 5,000
Referee: Oleh Pervushkin (Kyiv)
1996-03-3
13:00 LST

| Podillya Khmelnytsky (1L) | 2–5 | (PL) Dnipro Dnipropetrovsk |
|---|---|---|
| Fedorko 48' (pen.); Yatin 61' | Report | Palyanytsia 1', 17', 25'; Skrypnyk 21' (pen.); Sharan 33' |

Podillya Stadium, Khmelnytskyi
Attendance: 5,000
Referee: Stepan Selmensky (Uzhhorod)
1996-03-3
14:00 LST

| Khutrovyk Tysmenytsia (2L) | 0–1 | (PL) Nyva Ternopil |
|---|---|---|
| | Report | Demianchuk 75' |

Khutrovyk Stadium, Tysmenytsia
Attendance: 2,000
Referee: Vasyl Babych (Uzhhorod)
1996-03-3
14:00 LST

| Haray Zhovkva (2L) | 0–1 | (PL) Volyn Lutsk |
|---|---|---|
| Hrynyshyn (penalty missed) 56' | Report | Solodky 16'; Yatsurak (yellow card) 46' (yellow-red card) 87' |

Roztochia Stadium, Zhovkva
Attendance: 3,000
Referee: Ihor Ishchenko (Kyiv)
1996-03-3
14:00 LST

| Hazovyk Komarno (2L) | 0–0 (a.e.t.) | (PL) Nyva Vinnytsia |
|---|---|---|
| | Report |
Penalties
| | 6–7 |

Hazovyk Stadium, Komarno
Attendance: 2,000
Referee: Vadym Shelmenko (Kyiv)
1996-03-3
14:00 LST

| Nyva Myronivka (2L) | 3–4 | (PL) Karpaty Lviv |
|---|---|---|
| Rubanchuk 21'; Chernyshenko 23'; Perenchuk 27'; Chernyshenko (penalty missed) 52' | Report | Pokladok 28', 30'; Vovchuk 47'; Kolesnyk 68' |

Kolos Stadium, Karapyshi
Attendance: 3,000
Referee: Ihor Bezuhlyi (Lutsk)
1996-03-3
14:00 LST

| Naftokhimik Kremenchuk (1L) | 1–2 | (PL) Tavriya Simferopol |
|---|---|---|
| Solnyshkin 8' | Report | Antyukhin 42'; Oparin 63' |

Naftokhimik Stadium, Kremenchuk
Attendance: 3,000
Referee: Valeriy Stoyan (Alchevsk)
1996-03-3
14:00 LST

| Yavir Krasnopillya (1L) | 2–0 | (PL) Zorya-MALS Luhansk |
|---|---|---|
| Zavhorodniy 77'; Bohach 82' | Report |

Kolos Stadium, Krasnopillya
Attendance: 3,000
Referee: Viktor Dohadailo (Kyiv)
1996-03-3
14:00 LST

| Metalurh Novomoskovsk (2L) | 0–3 | (PL) Dynamo Kyiv |
|---|---|---|
| | Report | Mykhailenko 6'; Holovko 41'; Konovalov 85' |

Metalurh Stadium, Novomoskovsk
Attendance: 6,000
Referee: Ihor Khiblin (Khmelnytskyi)
1996-03-3
14:00 LST

| Metalurh Nikopol (1L) | 2–0 | (PL) Prykarpattia Ivano-Frankivsk |
|---|---|---|
| Kovalenko 30'; Katerusha 75' | Report |

Kutsenko Metalurh Stadium, Nikopol
Attendance: 1,500
Referee: Serhiy Dzyuba (Kyiv)
1996-03-3
14:00 LST

| Stal Alchevsk (1L) | 1–3 | (PL) Kremin Kremenchuk |
|---|---|---|
| Kovalkov 89' (pen.) | Report | Kovalenko 12', 45'; Kirlik 25' |

Stal Stadium, Alchevsk
Attendance: 3,000
Referee: Oleksandr Tyutyun (Fastiv)
1996-03-3
14:00 LST

| Shakhtar-2 Donetsk (2L) | 0–1 | (PL) Metalurh Zaporizhzhia |
|---|---|---|
| | Report | Kripak 81' |

Shakhtar Stadium, Makiivka
Attendance: 1,000
Referee: Oleksandr Hordiyenko (Dnipropetrovsk)
1996-03-3
14:00 LST

| Chaika Sevastopol (2L) | 0–1 | (PL) Torpedo Zaporizhzhia |
|---|---|---|
| | Report | Bondarenko 80' |

SC Sevastopol, Sevastopol
Attendance: 1,500
Referee: Volodymyr Kutsev (Donetsk)
1996-03-3
14:30 LST

| Zirka-NIBAS Kirovohrad (PL) | 1–0 | (PL) Chornomorets Odesa |
|---|---|---|
| Hrachov 12' | Report |

Zirka-NIBAS Stadium, Kirovohrad
Attendance: 5,000
Referee: Volodymyr Pyanykh (Donetsk)
1996-03-3
15:00 LST

| CSKA-Borysfen (PL) | 0–1 | (PL) Shakhtar Donetsk |
|---|---|---|
| | Report | Zubov 85' |

Republican Stadium, Kyiv
Attendance: 1,000
Referee: Vasyl Melnychuk (Simferopol)
1996-03-4
15:00 LST

| Dynamo-2 Kyiv (1L) | 2–2 (a.e.t.) | (PL) SC Mykolaiv |
|---|---|---|
| Datsenko 16'; Slyusar 87' | Report | Huzenko (penalty missed) 32'; Buhai 75' (pen.); Kudlyuk 85' |
Penalties
| | 5–4 |

Republican Stadium, Kyiv
Attendance: 1,000
Referee: Oleksandr Kosolapov (Kharkiv)

=== Second Elimination Round ===
1996-03-8
?:? LST

| Dnipro Dnipropetrovsk (PL) | 4–1 | (PL) Karpaty Lviv |
|---|---|---|
| Yevtushok 11'; Skrypnyk 54'; Palyanytsia 71'; Mizin 88' | Report | Vovchuk 53' |

Meteor Stadium, Dnipropetrovsk
Attendance: 4,000
Referee: Serhiy Tatulyan (Kyiv)
1996-03-8
14:00 LST

| Nyva Vinnytsia (PL) | 2–0 | (2L) Halychyna Drohobych |
|---|---|---|
| Chervonyi 30'; Matviychenko 39' | Report |

Central Park Stadium, Vinnytsia
Attendance: 4,000
Referee: Valeriy Avdysh (Simferopol)
1996-03-8
16:00 LST

| Dynamo Kyiv (PL) | 2–0 | (PL) Zirka-NIBAS Kirovohrad |
|---|---|---|
| Shkapenko 21'; Leonenko 90' | Report |

Republican Stadium, Kyiv
Attendance: 1,200
Referee: Viktor Derdo (Illichivsk)
1996-03-8
15:00 LST

| Tavriya Simferopol (PL) | 2–0 | (1L) Yavir Krasnopillia |
|---|---|---|
| Oparin 20'; Antyukhin 26' | Report |

Lokomotyv Stadium, Simferopol
Attendance: 350
Referee: Valeriy Onufer (Uzhhorod)
1996-03-8
14:00 LST

| Metalurh Zaporizhzhia (PL) | 2–0 (a.e.t.) | (PL) Torpedo Zaporizhzhia |
|---|---|---|
| Derevinsky 102'; Bohatyr 117' | Report |

Metalurh Stadium, Zaporizhzhia
Attendance: 5,000
Referee: Kostyantyn Panchyk (Simferopol)
1996-03-8
14:00 LST

| Kremin Kremenchuk (PL) | 1–0 | (1L) Metalurh Nikopol |
|---|---|---|
| Novikov 53' | Report |

Dnipro Stadium, Kremenchuk
Attendance: 7,000
Referee: Anatoliy Aranovsky (Kyiv)
1996-03-8
14:00 LST

| Shakhtar Donetsk (PL) | 2–0 (a.e.t.) | (1L) Dynamo-2 Kyiv |
|---|---|---|
| Kriventsov 95'; Kriventsov (penalty missed) 97'; Petrov 116' | Report |

Shakhtar Stadium, Makiivka
Attendance: 1,000
Referee: Ihor Horozhankin (Kirovohrad)
1996-03-8
14:00 LST

| Nyva Ternopil (PL) | 3–1 | (PL) Volyn Lutsk |
|---|---|---|
| Prokhorenkov 24'; Boharada 44' (o.g.); Shyshchenko 71' | Report | Mozolyuk 40' |

City Stadium, Ternopil
Attendance: 6,300
Referee: Ihor Yaremchuk (Kyiv)

=== Quarterfinals ===
| Team 1 | Score | Team 2 |
|---|---|---|
| SC Tavriya Simferopol | 0–1 | FC Dynamo Kyiv |
| FC Shakhtar Donetsk | 2–2 (a.e.t.) (4–2 p) | FC Dnipro Dnipropetrovsk |
| FC Nyva Vinnytsia | 1–0 | FC Nyva Ternopil |
| FC Kremin Kremenchuk | 2–1 | FC Metalurh Zaporizhzhia |

1996-04-2
17:00 LST

| Tavriya Simferopol | 0–1 | Dynamo Kyiv |
|---|---|---|
| | Report | Holovko 7' |

Lokomotyv Stadium, Simferopol
Attendance: 3,000
Referee: Ihor Horozhankin (Kirovohrad)
1996-04-2
?:? LST

| Shakhtar Donetsk | 2–2 (a.e.t.) | Dnipro Dnipropetrovsk |
|---|---|---|
| Starostyak 48'; Orbu (penalty missed) 54'; Voskoboinyk 88'; Petrov (penalty missed) 107'; Koval (yellow card) 52' (yellow-red card) 117' | Report | Topchiev 11'; Polunin 54'; Kurylenko (yellow card) 37' (yellow-red card) 82' |
Penalties
| | 4–2 |

Shakhtar Stadium, Donetsk
Attendance: 21,000
Referee: Anatoliy Aranovsky (Kyiv)
1996-04-2
17:00 LST

| Nyva Vinnytsia | 1–0 | Nyva Ternopil |
|---|---|---|
| Parshyn 60' | Report |

Central City Stadium, Vinnytsia
Attendance: 8,000
Referee: Serhiy Tatulyan (Kyiv)
1996-04-2
16:00 LST

| Kremin Kremenchuk | 2–1 | Metalurh Zaporizhzhia |
|---|---|---|
| Leonov 39'; Atelkin 67' | Report | Babiy 1' |

Dnipro Stadium, Kremenchuk
Attendance: 10,000
Referee: Ihor Khiblin (Khmelnytskyi)

=== Semifinals ===
| Team 1 | Score | Team 2 |
|---|---|---|
| FC Dynamo Kyiv | 2–0 | FC Kremin Kremenchuk |
| FC Nyva Vinnytsia | 0–0 (a.e.t.) (3–0 p) | FC Shakhtar Donetsk |

1996-04-26
17:30 LST

| Dynamo Kyiv | 2–0 | Kremin Kremenchuk |
|---|---|---|
| Maksymov 60'; Shevchenko 74' | Report |

Dynamo Stadium, Kyiv
Attendance: 10,000
Referee: Yaroslav Hrysyo (Lviv)
1996-04-27
16:00 LST

| Nyva Vinnytsia | 0–0 (a.e.t.) | Shakhtar Donetsk |
|---|---|---|
| | Report |
Penalties
| Riabtsev (penalty scored); Matviychenko (penalty scored); Haidarzhy (penalty scored) | 3–0 | Petrov (penalty missed); Orbu (penalty missed); Koval (penalty missed) |

Central City Stadium, Vinnytsia
Attendance: 20,000
Referee: Vadym Shevchenko (Kyiv)
- Note: Volodymyr Tsytkin caught all three Shakhtar's penalty shots allowing Nyva to advance to the finals.

=== Final ===
The final was held at the Republican Stadium on May 26, 1996, in Kyiv.

1996-05-26
?:? LST

| Dynamo Kyiv | 2–0 | Nyva Vinnytsia |
|---|---|---|
| Rebrov 27'; Maxymov 59' | Report |

NSC Olimpiyskiy, Kyiv
Attendance: 47,000
Referee: Valeriy Avdysh (Simferopol), (FIFA)

== Top goalscorers ==
| Scorer | Goals | Team |
|---|---|---|
| (Ukraine) Oleksandr Palyanytsia | 4 | Dnipro Dnipropetrovsk |
| (Ukraine) Oleksandr Perenchuk | 4 | Nyva Myronivka |
| (Ukraine) Oleksandr Ihnatiev | 4 | Nyva Myronivka |
| (Ukraine) Andriy Husin | 3 | CSKA-Borysfen Kyiv |
| (Ukraine) Volodymyr Taranov | 3 | Chaika Sevastopol |

== Attendances ==
=== Top attendances ===
| Rank | Round | Home team | Away team | Result | Location | Attendance |
|---|---|---|---|---|---|---|
| 1 | Final | Dynamo Kyiv | Nyva Vinnytsia | 2–0 | Republican Stadium, Kyiv | 47,000 |
| 2 | Quarterfinals | Shakhtar Donetsk | Dnipro Dnipropetrovsk | 2 – 2 a.e.t. | Shakhtar Stadium, Donetsk | 21,000 |
| 3 | Semifinals | Nyva Vinnytsia | Shakhtar Donetsk | 0 – 0 a.e.t. | Central City Stadium, Vinnytsia | 20,000 |
| 4 | Semifinals | Dynamo Kyiv | Kremin Kremenchuk | 2–0 | Lobanovsky Dynamo Stadium, Kyiv | 10,000 |
| 4 | Quarterfinals | Kremin Kremenchuk | Metalurh Zaporizhzhia | 2–1 | Dnipro Stadium, Kremenchuk | 10,000 |

Ukrainian Cup 1992–93 Winners

FC Dynamo Kyiv
Second title

== See also ==
- Ukrainian Premier League 1995-96
