= 1996 Ukrainian Cup final =

- Event: Ukrainian Cup 1995-96
Dynamo Kyiv	Nyva Vinnytsia
2	0
- Date: 26 May 1996
- Venue: NSC Olimpiyskyi, Kyiv
- Referee: Serhiy Tatulian (Kyiv)
- Attendance: 47,000
- Weather: 23°C

The 1996 Ukrainian Cup final was a football match that took place at the NSC Olimpiyskiy on 26 May 1996. The match was the 5th Ukrainian Cup Final and it was contested by FC Dynamo Kyiv and FC Nyva Vinnytsia. The 1996 Ukrainian Cup Final was the fifth to be held in the Ukrainian capital Kyiv. Dynamo won with goals from Serhii Rebrov and Yuri Maxymov.

There were four yellow cards issued at this game: two to Dynamo players and two to Nyva.

== Road to Kyiv ==
Both teams started from the first round of the competition (1/16). Dynamo traveled two rounds to central Ukraine and then for the quarter-finals and semi-finals the club played at its home ground. Nyva reached the final in a similar way. The first couple of rounds it spent traveling around the Lviv Oblast and then also played at its home turf. In the semi-finals Nyva swept Shakhtar aside with a remarkable 3–0 win. Neither Dynamo nor Nyva had allowed any goals past their goalkeepers.

Dynamo

Round 1 (1st leg)	Metalurh N/m	0–3	Dynamo
Round 2 (1st leg)	Zirka-NIBAS	0–2	Dynamo
Quarter-final (1st leg)	Dynamo	1–0	Tavriya
Semi-final (1st leg)	Dynamo	2–0	Kremin

Nyva

Round 1 (1st leg)	Hazovyk Komarno	0–0 pen. 6:7	Nyva V.
Round 2 (1st leg)	Halychyna	0–2	Nyva V.
Quarter-final (1st leg)	Nyva V.	1–0	Nyva T.
Semi-final (1st leg)	Nyva V.	3–0	Dnipro

== Match details ==
26 May 1996
??:?? LST

Dynamo Kyiv	2 – 0	Nyva Vinnytsia
Rebrov 27'; Maksymov 59'	Report

NSC Olimpiyskyi, Kyiv
Attendance: 47,000
Referee: Valeriy Avdysh (Simferopol), (FIFA)

Dynamo Kyiv	FC Nyva Vinnytsia

Dynamo Kyiv:
GK	?	(Ukraine) Oleksandr Shovkovskyi
DF	?	(Ukraine) Oleh Luzhnyi (c)
DF	?	(Ukraine) Serhiy Bezhenar	(yellow card) 75'
DF	?	(Ukraine) Oleksandr Holovko
DF	?	(Ukraine) Serhiy Shmatovalenko
MF	?	(Ukraine) Dmytro Mykhaylenko
MF	?	(Ukraine) Serhiy Rebrov	27'	(substituted off) 82'
MF	?	(Ukraine) Yuriy Maksymov	59'	(substituted off) 70'
MF	?	(Ukraine) Vitaliy Kosovskyi
FW	?	(Ukraine) Viktor Leonenko	(yellow card) 41'	(substituted off) 60'
FW	?	(Ukraine) Andriy Shevchenko
Substitutes:
MF	?	(Ukraine) Pavlo Shkapenko	(substituted in) 82'
MF	?	(Ukraine) Yuriy Kalitvintsev	(substituted in) 70'
MF	?	(Ukraine) Yevhen Pokhlebayev	(substituted in) 60'
Manager:
(Ukraine) Yozhef Sabo

Nyva Vinnytsia:
GK	?	(Ukraine) Volodymyr Tsytkin	(substituted off) 66'
DF	?	(Ukraine) Leonid Haidarzhy (c)
MF	?	(Ukraine) Kostyantyn Sosenko
MF	?	(Ukraine) Vyacheslav Zaporozhchenko	(yellow card) 40'
MF	?	(Ukraine) Yuriy Solovyenko	(yellow card) 11'
FW	?	(Ukraine) Dmytro Lelyuk	(substituted off) 35'
DF	?	(Ukraine) Oleksiy Ryabtsev
DF	?	(Ukraine) Ruslan Romanchuk
MF	?	(Ukraine) Oleksandr Chervonyi	(substituted off) 46'
FW	?	(Ukraine) Pavlo Matviychenko
DF	?	(Ukraine) Oleksandr Lyubynskyi
Substitutes:
GK	?	(Ukraine) Yevhen Nemodruk	(substituted in) 66'
FW	?	(Ukraine) Anatoliy Balatskyi	(substituted in) 35'
FW	?	(Ukraine) Oleksandr Laktionov	(substituted in) 46'
Manager:
(Ukraine) Serhiy Morozov

MATCH OFFICIALS

- Assistant referees:
  - Valeriy Lysenko (Odesa)
  - Mykhaylo Sydor (Lviv)
- Fourth official: Serhiy Tatulian (Kyiv)

MATCH RULES

- 90 minutes.
- 30 minutes of extra-time if necessary.
- Penalty shoot-out if scores still level.
- Seven named substitutes
- 3 substitutions, plus two more in extra time.

Ukrainian Cup 1996 Winners

FC Dynamo Kyiv
Second title

== Match statistics ==
	Dynamo	Nyva
Total shots	?	?
Shots on target	?	?
Ball possession	?%	?%
Corner kicks	?	?
Fouls committed	?	?
Offsides	?	?
Yellow cards	?	?
Red cards	?	?

== See also ==
- Ukrainian Cup 1995-96
