= Yevgeni Kryachik =

Russian footballer

Personal information
- Full name: Yevgeni Aleksandrovich Kryachik
- Date of birth: 9 September 1969 (age 57)
- Place of birth: Khabarovsk, Russian SFSR
- Height: 1.78 m (5 ft 10 in)
- Positions: Forward; midfielder

Team information
- Current team: FC Torpedo Armavir (director)

Senior career*
Years	Team	Apps	(Gls)
1986–1987	FC Amur Komsomolsk-na-Amure	14	(0)
1990	FC Amur Komsomolsk-na-Amure	25	(1)
1991–1992	Bukovyna Chernivtsi	21	(1)
1993–1994	Kremin Kremenchuk	29	(2)
1994	FC Metallurg Lipetsk	33	(4)
1995	FC Kolos Krasnodar	40	(4)
1996	FC Lada Togliatti	16	(0)
1997	FC Neftekhimik Nizhnekamsk	24	(3)
1998	FC Kuban Krasnodar	13	(4)
2001	FC BSK Spirovo (amateur)		
2002	FC BSK Spirovo	5	(0)
2002–2003	FC Ural Yekaterinburg	11	(0)
2003	FC Smena Komsomolsk-na-Amure	6	(0)
2004	FC Kavkaztransgaz Izobilny	8	(0)

Managerial career
- 2008–2011: FC Krasnodar (academy)
- 2011–2014: FC Krasnodar (youth team director)
- 2015–: FC Torpedo Armavir (director)
- * Club domestic league appearances and goals

Yevgeni Aleksandrovich Kryachik (Russian: Евгений Александрович Крячик; born 9 September 1969) is a Russian football official and a former player. He is the director with FC Torpedo Armavir.
