= Oleksandr Chervonyi =

Ukrainian footballer

Personal information
- Full name: Oleksandr Volodymyrovych Chervonyi
- Date of birth: 1 September 1961 (age 65)
- Place of birth: Oleksandrivka, Yurivka Raion, Dnipropetrovsk Oblast, Ukrainian SSR
- Height: 1.76 m (5 ft 9 1/2 in)
- Position: Defender

Senior career*
Years	Team	Apps	(Gls)
1981–1982	Kolos Pavlohrad	62	(2)
1983–1984	Dnipro Dnipropetrovsk	10	(0)
1984–1985	Kolos Pavlohrad	9	(0)
1985	Kolos Nikopol	37	(2)
1986	Dnipro Dnipropetrovsk	2	(0)
1986–1988	Kolos Nikopol	88	(4)
1988–1990	Dnipro Dnipropetrovsk	18	(1)
1990	Rotor Volgograd	14	(0)
1990–1992	Nyíregyháza Spartacus		
1992	Shahtar Pavlohrad	2	(0)
1992–1994	Veres Rivne	43	(2)
1994	Dnipro Dnipropetrovsk	8	(0)
1995	Zorya-MALS Luhansk	7	(0)
1995–1997	Nyva Vinnytsia	36	(0)
1997–1998	Metalurh Mariupol	10	(0)

Managerial career
- 2001–2002: Metalurh Mariupol (assistant)
- 2007: Illichivets Mariupol (interim)
- 2009: Stal Dniprodzerzhynsk
- * Club domestic league appearances and goals

Oleksandr Chervonyi (Ukrainian: Олександр Володимирович Червоний; born 1 September 1961) is a Ukrainian professional football coach and a former player.

He played 4 games in the European Cup 1989–90 for FC Dnipro Dnipropetrovsk.

== Honours ==
- Soviet Top League champion: 1983, 1988.
- Soviet Top League runner-up: 1989.
- Soviet Top League bronze: 1984.
- Soviet Cup winner: 1989.
- USSR Super Cup winner: 1989.
- USSR Federation Cup winner: 1989.
- USSR Federation Cup finalist: 1990.
- Ukrainian Premier League bronze: 1995.
