= Asan Mustafayev =

Ukrainian football player and coach (born 1965)

Personal information
- Full name: Asan Seferovych Mustafayev
- Date of birth: 11 May 1965 (age 61)
- Place of birth: Dushanbe, Tajik SSR
- Height: 1.81 m (5 ft 11 1/2 in)
- Position: Defender

Team information
- Current team: Tajikistan (conditioning coach)

Senior career*
Years	Team	Apps	(Gls)
1982	Avtomobilist Termez	15	(0)
1983–1984	Khujand Leninabad	49	(4)
1985–1986	Pamir Dushanbe	11	(1)
1987	Vakhsh Qurghonteppa	8	(0)
1987	SKA Khabarovsk	13	(0)
1989	Sokhibkor Khalkabad	2	(0)
1989–1990	Sogdiana Jizzakh	16	(1)
1990	Tavriya Simferopol	2	(0)
1990	Okean Kerch	10	(1)
1991	Dinamo Sukhumi	24	(0)
1992–1993	Bukovyna Chernivtsi	28	(0)
1993–1994	Metalist Kharkiv	36	(0)
1994	Kremin Kremenchuk	7	(0)
1995	Podillya Khmelnytskyi	12	(0)
1995	Uralmash Yekaterinburg	1	(0)
1995	→ FC Uralmash-d Yekaterinburg	1	(0)
1995–1996	Zorya-MALS Luhansk	26	(0)
2000–2003	Troitsk-2001 Troitsk		

Managerial career
- 2013–: Tajikistan (conditioning coach)
- * Club domestic league appearances and goals

Asan Seferovych Mustafayev (Ukrainian: Асан Сеферович Мустафаєв; born 11 May 1965) is a Ukrainian-Tajikistani football coach and a former player. He works as a conditioning coach with the Tajikistan national football team.
