= Oleksiy Antyukhin =

Ukrainian footballer

Personal information
- Full name: Oleksiy Volodymyrovych Antyukhin
- Date of birth: 25 November 1971 (age 54)
- Place of birth: Zaporizhzhia, Ukrainian SSR, Soviet Union
- Height: 1.85 m (6 ft 1 in)
- Position: Forward

Senior career*
Years	Team	Apps	(Gls)
1989–1990	Torpedo Zaporizhzhia	33	(0)
1990–1993	Metalurh Zaporizhzhia	14	(2)
1993–1996	Tavriya Simferopol	82	(37)
1996–1998	Dynamo Kyiv	6	(0)
1996–1997	→ Dynamo-2 Kyiv	25	(22)
1997–1998	→ Vorskla Poltava (loan)	28	(8)
1997–1998	→ Vorskla-2 Poltava (loan)	7	(4)
1999–2000	Tavriya Simferopol	45	(16)
2001	Uralan Elista	4	(0)
2002–2003	Chernomorets Novorossiysk	25	(1)
2003	Dynamo Stavropol	15	(7)
2004	Dynamo-Ihroservice Simferopol	11	(0)

International career
1996	Ukraine	1	(0)

Managerial career
- 2012–: Tavriya Simferopol under-19
- * Club domestic league appearances and goals

Oleksiy Volodymyrovych Antyukhin (Ukrainian: Олексій Володимирович Антюхін; born 25 November 1971) is a Ukrainian retired professional footballer.

== Career ==
Antyukhin played professional football for SC Tavriya Simferopol, FC Dynamo Kyiv and FC Vorskla Poltava.

== International career ==
He played his only game for the Ukraine national football team on 9 April 1996 in a friendly match against Moldova.
