= Oleksandr Perenchuk =

Ukrainian footballer

Personal information
- Full name: Oleksandr Ivanovych Perenchuk
- Date of birth: 30 January 1966 (age 60)
- Place of birth: Ukrainian SSR, Soviet Union
- Position: Defender

Senior career*
Years	Team	Apps	(Gls)
1992	FC Ros Bila Tserkva	35	(4)
1993	FC Khimik Severodonetsk	39	(2)
1993	FC Korosten	1	(0)
1994–1996	FC Nyva Myronivka	84	(2)
1996–1998	FC Fakel Varva	61	(4)
1999	FC Paperovyk Malyn	12	(0)
1999–2000	FC Dnipro Kyiv	8	(1)
2002	FC Bucha	10	(0)
- * Club domestic league appearances and goals

Oleksandr Perenchuk (Ukrainian: Олександр Іванович Перенчук; born 30 January 1966) is a former Ukrainian football defender.
