= Valery Alistarov =

Soviet, Russian and Ukrainian footballer (born 1957)

Personal information
- Full name: Valery Mikhaylovich Alistarov
- Date of birth: 28 November 1957 (age 68)
- Place of birth: Kaluga, Russian SFSR, USSR
- Height: 1.82 m (5 ft 11 1/2 in)
- Positions: Midfielder; forward

Youth career
- Lokomotiv Kaluga

Senior career*
Years	Team	Apps	(Gls)
- Torpedo Kaluga
- Kondrovo
1976–1977	Lokomotiv Kaluga		
1977–1979	Zvezda Obninsk		
1980–1981	Lokomotiv Kaluga	66	(20)
1982–1989	Metalurh Zaporizhzhia	275	(19)
1989–1996	Bukovyna Chernivtsi	146	(26)
1992–1993	Kremin Kremenchuk	24	(1)
1994–1996	Turbostroitel Kaluga	90	(18)
1997	GBK Kokkola	6	(0)
1997–1998	Torgmash Lyubertsy	33	(7)
1998	Kondrovo		
1999	Lokomotiv Kaluga	31	(4)
1999–2000	KZHI-470 Aleksin	6	(0)
2005	Kondrovo		
2005–2008	Zarya Duminichi		

Managerial career
- 1999–2002: Lokomotiv Kaluga (coach)
- * Club domestic league appearances and goals as of 26 November 2016

Valery Mikhaylovich Alistarov (Russian: Валерий Михайлович Алистаров; born 28 November 1957, Kaluga) is a Soviet, Russian and Ukrainian footballer. Master of Sports of the USSR. RSFSR Champion 1977.

== Biography ==
The pupil of FC Lokomotiv Kaluga. He played in the highest league of the championship of Ukraine FSC Bukovyna (he was captain of the team) and MFC Kremin.

Player's career continued until 2008, speaking at the amateur level for FC Zarya Duminichi, where he was player-coach.

Later, veteran player FC Zarya-KADVI, and the coach of the first team, serving in the championships Kaluga and Kaluga Oblast.
