= Volodymyr Tsytkin =

Ukrainian association football player

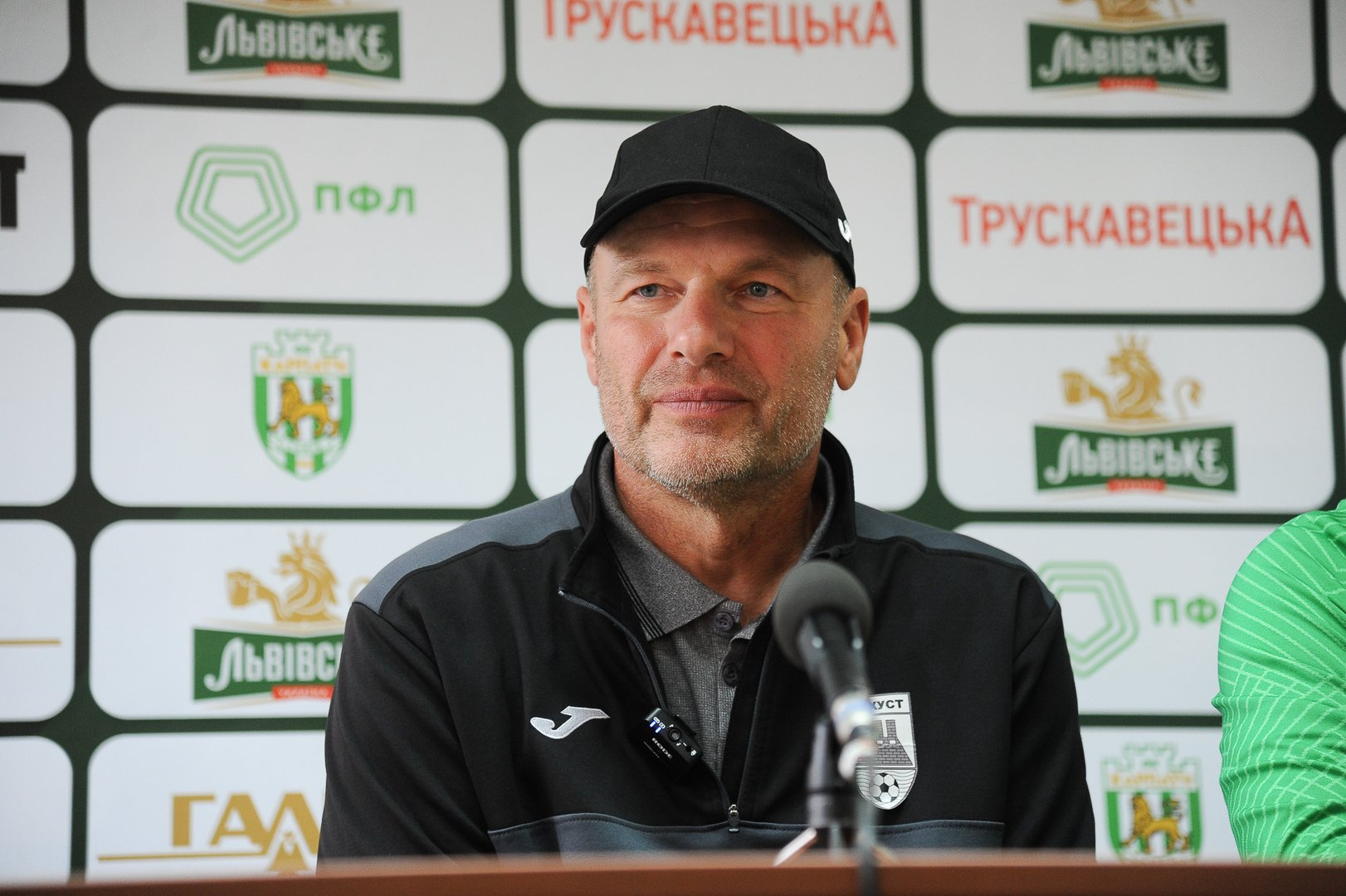

Personal information
- Full name: Volodymyr Borysovych Tsytkin
- Date of birth: 1 August 1966 (age 60)
- Place of birth: Kyiv, Soviet Union (now Ukraine)
- Height: 1.90 m (6 ft 3 in)
- Position: Goalkeeper

Team information
- Current team: Khust (manager)

Youth career
- 1976–1984: Dynamo Kyiv

Senior career*
Years	Team	Apps	(Gls)
1984–1987	Dynamo Irpin	128	(0)
1988	Zorya Luhansk	4	(0)
1988–1989	Dynamo Bila Tserkva	76	(0)
1990–1992	Bukovyna Chernivtsi	82	(0)
1993–1994	Nyva Vinnytsia	41	(0)
1995	Maccabi Acre		(0)
1995–1998	Nyva Vinnytsia	95	(0)
1999	Prykarpattia Ivano-Frankivsk	3	(0)
1999	→ Enerhetyk Burshtyn (loan)	2	(0)
2000–2002	Obolon Kyiv	57	(0)
2002	Obolon-2 Kyiv	0	(0)

Managerial career
- 2003–2012: Ukraine U17 (goalkeeping coach)
- 2006: Nyva-Svitanok Vinnytsia (assistant)
- 2006–2007: Chornomorets Odesa (goalkeeping coach)
- 2007: Nyva-Svitanok Vinnytsia (goalkeeping coach)
- 2008: Zirka Kirovohrad (assistant)
- 2009: Nyva Vinnytsia (goalkeeping coach)
- 2010: Obolon Kyiv (goalkeeping coach)
- 2011: Baltika Kaliningrad (assistant)
- 2014–2015: Ukraine U17
- 2015–2016: Ukraine U18
- 2016: Ukraine U19
- 2017: Nyva-V Vinnytsia (goalkeeping coach)
- 2018: Zenit-2 Saint Petersburg (goalkeeping coach)
- 2018: Nyva Vinnytsia (goalkeeping coach)
- 2019: Moldova (goalkeeping coach)
- 2021: Nyva Vinnytsia
- 2022–: Khust
- * Club domestic league appearances and goals

Volodymyr Borysovych Tsytkin (Ukrainian: Володимир Борисович Циткін; born 1 August 1966) is a Soviet and Ukrainian retired footballer who played as a goalkeeper and current football manager of Khust.

== Career ==
After retiring in 2002, he worked for various clubs as a goalkeeping coach.
