= 1992 Ukrainian Cup final =

- Event: 1992 Ukrainian Cup
Chornomorets Odesa	Metalist Kharkiv
1	0
- Date: 31 May 1992
- Venue: Republican Stadium, Kyiv
- Referee: Yevhen Kanana (Donetsk)
- Attendance: 12,000
- Weather: 14°C

The 1992 Ukrainian Cup final was a football match that took place at the Republican Stadium on 31 May 1992. The match was the 1st Ukrainian Cup Final and it was contested by Chornomorets Odesa and Metalist Kharkiv. The 1992 Ukrainian Cup Final was the first to be held in the Ukrainian capital Kyiv. Chornomorets won the match 1–0 on the silver goal rule when the Illya Tsymbalar's goal in 107 minute gave the Odesa club the win during the extra time.

The match also had one yellow card issued to Kastorny (Metalist).

== Road to Kyiv ==
Both clubs were among the six Ukrainian clubs that last year competed in the Soviet Supreme League and therefore started from the second round (Round of 16).

The two teams had some difficulties along the way. Chornomorets lost its first game in Zhytomyr to Polissya 1–4, but reinstated themselves in the return leg with a 7–1 win. Then had to visit Zaporizhia two rounds in a row before qualifying for this final. Metalist came to the final after defeating Shakhtar in the semi-finals and were considered able to repeat their previous Soviet achievement by earning another national trophy.

Chornomorets Odesa

Round 2 (1st leg)	Polissya	4–1	Chornomorets
Round 2 (2nd leg)	Chornomorets	7–1	Polissya
	(Chornomorets won 8–5 on aggregate)		
Quarter-final (1st leg)	Chornomorets	2–0	Metalurh Zaporizhia
Quarter-final (2nd leg)	Metalurh Zaporizhia	1–1	Chornomorets
	(Chornomorets won 3–1 on aggregate)		
Semi-final (1st leg)	Chornomorets	3–1	Torpedo
Semi-final (2nd leg)	Torpedo	0–0	Chornomorets
	(Chornomorets won 3–1 on aggregate)		

Metalist Kharkiv

Round 2 (1st leg)	Krystal Chortkiv	1–2	Metalist
Round 2 (2nd leg)	Metalist	2–0	Krystal Chortkiv
	(Metalist won 4–1 on aggregate)		
Quarter-final (1st leg)	Metalist	2–0	Naftovyk
Quarter-final (2nd leg)	Naftovyk	1–0	Metalist
	(Metalist won 2–1 on aggregate)		
Semi-final (1st leg)	Metalist	1–0	Shakhtar
Semi-final (2nd leg)	Shakhtar	1–1	Metalist
	(Metalist won 2–1 on aggregate)		

== Previous encounters ==
Both clubs have existed since Soviet times. In cup competitions, they met as early as 1949. Their first match took place on 16 June 1949 in the qualifications of the 1949 Soviet Cup. Pischevik Odessa beat Dzerzhinets Kharkov 1–0.

== Match details ==
31 May 1992
19:00 LST

Chornomorets Odesa	1 – 0	Metalist Kharkiv
Tsymbalar 107'	Report

Republican Stadium, Kyiv
Attendance: 12,000
Referee: Yevhen Kanana (Donetsk), (FIFA)

Chornomorets Odesa	Metalist Kharkiv

Chornomorets Odesa:
GK	?	(Ukraine) Viktor Hryshko (c)
MF	?	(Ukraine) Yuriy Nikiforov
DF	?	(Ukraine) Yuriy Shelepnytskyi	(substituted off) 75'
DF	?	(Ukraine) Yuriy Bukel
DF	?	(Ukraine) Serhiy Tretyak
MF	?	(Ukraine) Viktor Yablonskyi
DF	?	(Ukraine) Ilya Tsymbalar
DF	?	(Ukraine) Ivan Hetsko
MF	?	(Ukraine) Oleh Koshelyuk	(substituted off) 118'
FW	?	(Ukraine) Yuriy Sak
FW	?	(Ukraine) Serhiy Husyev	(substituted off) 79'
Substitutes:
DF	?	(Ukraine) Dmytro Parfenov	(substituted on) 75'
MF	?	(Ukraine) Oleksandr Spitsyn	(substituted on) 118'
FW	?	(Ukraine) Serhiy Zirchenko	(substituted on) 79'
GK	?	(Ukraine) Oleh Suslov
Manager:
(Ukraine) Viktor Prokopenko

Metalist Kharkiv:
GK	?	(Ukraine) Oleksandr Pomazun
DF	?	(Ukraine) Oleh Kastornyi	(yellow card) 16'	(substituted off) 91'
MF	?	(Ukraine) Viktor Yalovskyi	(substituted off) 108'
MF	?	(Ukraine) Ivan Panchyshyn (c)
MF	?	(Ukraine) Roman Pets
FW	?	(Ukraine) Yuriy Mykolayenko
DF	?	(Ukraine) Dmytro Khomukha
DF	?	(Ukraine) Serhiy Kandaurov
MF	?	(Russia) Guram Adzhoyev	(substituted off) 112'
FW	?	(Ukraine) Oleksandr Pryzetko
DF	?	(Ukraine) Vadym Kolesnyk
Substitutes:
DF	?	(Ukraine) Oleksandr Borovyk	(substituted on) 91'
FW	?	(Ukraine) Yaroslav Lantsfer	(substituted on) 108'
FW	?	(Ukraine) Andriy Shynkarov	(substituted on) 112'
Manager:
(Ukraine) Leonid Tkachenko

MATCH OFFICIALS

- Assistant referees:
  - Volodymyr Tukhovsky (Simferopol)
  - Yaroslav Hrysio (Lviv)
- Fourth official:?

MATCH RULES

- 90 minutes.
- 30 minutes of extra-time if necessary.
- Penalty shoot-out if scores still level.
- Seven named substitutes
- Maximum of 3 substitutions.

== Match statistics ==
	Chornomorets	Metalist
Total shots	?	?
Shots on target	?	?
Ball possession	?%	?%
Corner kicks	?	?
Fouls committed	?	?
Offsides	?	?
Yellow cards	?	?
Red cards	?	?

== See also ==
- Ukrainian Cup 1992
