= 1992 Ukrainian Cup =

1992 Ukrainian Football Cup
Кубок України з футболу

Tournament details
- Country: Ukraine
- Dates: 10 February – 31 May
- Teams: 45

Final positions
- Champions: Chornomorets Odesa (1st title)
- Runners-up: Metalist Kharkiv

Tournament statistics
- Matches played: 58
- Goals scored: 140 (2.41 per match)
- Top goal scorer: Oleksandr Zayets (6)

The 1992 Ukrainian Cup was the inaugural edition of the Ukrainian Cup competition.

Like the championship, the first edition of the Cup had a tight schedule as the Football Federation of Ukraine was given just several months in order to switch to the European seasonal format with the minimum required matches played.

The competition started on February 10 and the final was played on May 31. Only the members of the Vyshcha (Higher) and Persha (First) Leagues competed this season's competition. It was the first National Cup edition replacing the previous competition of the Ukrainian SSR Cup, which was organized as a regional competition. The last winner of that Soviet competition FC Temp Shepetivka was eliminated in the first round by Kremin Kremenchuk.

The first trophy was won by Chornomorets Odesa thus qualifying to the qualification round of UEFA Cup Winners' Cup.

== Organization ==
The competition consisted of six rounds with the sixth being the final game. All rounds were conducted as a single elimination tournament. The first two rounds and the final consisted of a single leg, while the rest included the two-leg, home and away, match-up.

The competition involved participation of clubs from the top two tiers accounting for the total of 45. The three second teams that competed in the second tier did not participate. Six members of the 1991 Soviet Top League were entering competition starting from the Round of 16. In addition to them Azovets Mariupol was given a bye to the second round.

The winner of the competition gained a chance to qualify for the UEFA Cup Winner's Cup competition.

Participating teams

- 1992 Ukrainian Premier League (20)
- 1992 Ukrainian First League (25) (except for the second teams)

=== Distribution ===
	Teams entering in this round	Teams advancing from previous round
First round (38 teams)	14 participants of the Supreme League; 24 participants of the First League	
Second round (20 teams)	1 participant of the First League (Azovets Mariupol)	19 winners from the first round
Round of 16 (16 teams)	6 participants of the Supreme League	10 winners from the second round

=== Brief overview ===
The tournament started on February 10, 1992, with the game between Podillia Khmelnytsky and Bukovyna Chernivtsi right in the middle of the Zakarpattia Oblast in the village of Ilnytsia and culminated in the final game in Kyiv on May 31, 1992. With the organization of the Ukrainian Cup competition the three Ukrainian clubs Dynamo Kyiv, Chornomorets Odesa, and Metalist Kharkiv that still were in competition of the Soviet Cup with their quarterfinals games scheduled on March 25, 1992, had those fixtures canceled, abandoning that competition.

The highest attending game happened to be in the Round of 16 when FC Skala Stryi were playing against FC Dynamo Kyiv in the city of Stryi in front of 17,000 spectators. Skala lost that game in the overtime by the goal from Oleg Salenko. Even the final game attendance of 12,000 could not beat that festival of sport in the small city of the Lviv Oblast. The lowest attendance of the competition was in the game between Kolos Nikopol and Polissia Zhytomyr which took place on February 16, 1992, just outside the city of Nikopol in Chkalove village and was witnessed only by 150 people. The highest scoring game took place in Odesa when the local Chornomorets avenged its poor performance in Zhytomyr by beating Polissia 7:1. The biggest margin in goals scored was recorded in Zaporizhia when the local Metalurh won over Vahonobudivnyk 7:0. The most surprising was the elimination of the Soviet Cup participant Dynamo Kyiv that lost its quarterfinal stand off against the Zaporizhian Automakers 1:2 in aggregate.

== Competition schedule ==
=== First round ===
All games took place on February 16, 1992, except the game in Zakarpattia between Podillia – Bukovyna which took place on February 10, 1992.

All 39 clubs out 45 took part in this round. The other six clubs, participants of the Soviet Top League, received bye for the next two rounds to the Round of 16. The 39 clubs played off for another 10 passes.

10 February 1992	Podillia Khmelnytskyi (1L)	1 – 1 (a.e.t.) (1–3 p)	(PL) Bukovyna Chernivtsi	Ilnytsia, Zakarpattia Oblast
	Buhai 42'	Report; Report	Hiy 48'	Stadium: village stadium Attendance: 200; Referee: Valeriy Onufer (Uzhhorod)
	Penalties
	Kulinich (penalty scored); Ptashnyk (penalty missed); Buhai (penalty missed); Arhudiayev (penalty missed)		(penalty scored) Sobotiuk; (penalty scored) Hiy; (penalty scored) Fedorov; (penalty missed) Zadorozhniak

16 February 1992	Kolos Nikopol (1L)	1 – 2	(1L) Polissya Zhytomyr	Chkalove, Dnipropetrovsk Oblast
	Kostykov 44'	Report	Zholtonosov 14'; Strykharchuk 25' (pen.)	Stadium: Kolos; Attendance: 150; Referee: Viktor Zviahintsev (Donetsk)

16 February 1992	Stal Alchevsk (1L)	2 – 1	(1L) Zakarpattia Uzhhorod	Alchevsk, Luhansk Oblast
	Mozhayev 46'; Hnezdilov 66'	Report	Kalashnikov 12'	Stadium: Stal; Attendance: 2,100; Referee: Viktor Holovko

16 February 1992	Vahonobudivnyk Stakhanov (1L)	1 – 1 (a.e.t.) (4–3 p)	(1L) Khimik Severodonetsk	Stakhanov, Luhansk Oblast
	Zanin 112' (pen.)	Report	Slavinskyi 102'	Stadium: Vahonobudivnyk; Attendance: 1,000; Referee: Yevhen Kanana (Donetsk)
	Penalties
	Zanin (penalty scored); Boldarev (penalty scored); Sushko (penalty scored); Marchenko (penalty scored); Lebediev (penalty missed)		(penalty scored) Slavinskyi; (penalty scored) Hlazunov; (penalty scored) Romanov; (penalty missed) Fedorko; (penalty missed) Yaroshenko

16 February 1992	Avtomobilist Sumy (1L)	1 – 0	(PL) Nyva Ternopil	Sumy
	Samolyuk 17'	Report		Stadium: Kolos; Attendance: 1,500; Referee: Leonid Bavykin (Kharkiv)

16 February 1992	SKA Odesa (PL)	1 – 1 (a.e.t.) (5–4 p)	(PL) Sudnobudivnyk Mykolaiv	Odesa
	Musolitin 99'	Report	Hrozov 109'	Stadium: SKA; Attendance: 1,000; Referee: Valeriy Avdysh (Simferopol)
	Penalties
	Kharkivshchenko (penalty scored); Zinich (penalty scored); Lesh (penalty scored); Mokan (penalty scored); Ohorodnik (penalty scored)		(penalty scored) Pavlov; (penalty scored) Vysokos; (penalty scored) Chulak; (penalty missed) Mashnin; (penalty scored) Zinchenko

16 February 1992	Artania Ochakiv (1L)	1 – 3	(PL) Zorya-MALS Luhansk	Ochakiv, Mykolaiv Oblast
	Palamarchuk 1'	Report	Huseinov 24'; Fursov 72'; Sevidov 75'	Stadium: Sokil; Attendance: 2,500; Referee: Valeriy Lysenko (Odesa)

16 February 1992	SKA Kyiv (1L)	1 – 2 (a.e.t.)	(1L) Kryvbas Kryvyi Rih	Kyiv
	Kashynskyi 64'	Report	Shulga 27'; Cherenkov 107'	Stadium: SKA; Attendance: 200; Referee: Oleksiy Katsman (Kirovohrad)

16 February 1992	Vorskla Poltava (1L)	1 – 0	(1L) Desna Chernihiv	Poltava
	Lukash 75' (pen.)	Report		Stadium: Vorskla; Attendance: 6,000; Referee: Vadym Shevchenko (Kyiv)

16 February 1992	Volyn Lutsk (PL)	2 – 3	(PL) Torpedo Zaporizhia	Dachne, Volyn Oblast
	Plotko (penalty missed) 17'; Dykyi 49'; Plotko 62'	Report	Bondarenko 26'; Volkov 35'; Zayets 57'	Stadium: Volyn training field Attendance: 3,000; Referee: Yaroslav Hrysio (Lviv)

16 February 1992	Chaika Sevastopol (1L)	0 – 2	(PL) Tavriya Simferopol	Alushta, Crimean ASSR
		Report	Shevchenko 32' (pen.); Novikov 55'	Stadium: Spartak; Attendance: 2,500; Referee: Oleksandr Dehtyarev (Odesa)

16 February 1992	Halychyna Drohobych (1L)	0 – 2	(PL) Naftovyk Okhtyrka	Drohobych, Lviv Oblast
		Report	Hrachov 42'; Piskun 66'	Stadium: Kranovyk; Attendance: 3,000; Referee: Anatoliy Aranovskyi (Kyiv)

16 February 1992	Polihraftekhnika Oleksandriya (1L)	0 – 0 (a.e.t.) (4–3 p)	(PL) Prykarpattia Ivano-Frankivsk	Oleksandriya, Kirovohrad Oblast
	Puhach (red card) 95'	Report	Khomyn (red card) 95'	Stadium: Shakhtar; Attendance: 4,500; Referee: Oleksandr Tiutiun (Fastiv)
	Penalties
	Mykhailenko (penalty scored); Bohatyr (penalty scored); Iriohlu (penalty scored); Lyubynskyi (penalty scored)		(penalty scored) Rusak; (penalty scored) Lakhmai; (penalty scored) Kovalchuk; (penalty missed) Rusanovskyi; (penalty missed) Shulyatytskyi

16 February 1992	Temp Shepetivka (PL)	1 – 2	(PL) Kremin Kremenchuk	Alushta, Crimean ASSR
	Dovhalets 85'	Report	Konovalchuk 2', 20'	Stadium: Spartak; Attendance: 2,000; Referee: Volodymyr Tukhovskyi (Simferopol)

16 February 1992	Shakhtar Pavlohrad (1L)	2 – 1	(1L) Krystal Kherson	Pavlohrad, Dnipropetrovsk Oblast
	Trubnykov 40'; Chervonyi 75'	Report	Papadopulo 20'	Stadium: Shakhtar; Attendance: 450; Referee: Valeriy Stoyan (Alchevsk)

16 February 1992	Krystal Chortkiv (1L)	2 – 0	(1L) Pryladyst Mukachevo	Chortkiv, Ternopil Oblast
	Danylyshyn 8', 70'	Report		Stadium: Kharchovyk; Attendance: 5,000; Referee: Yaroslav Lemekh (Lviv)

16 February 1992	Karpaty Lviv (PL)	1 – 0	(1L) Ros Bila Tserkva	Lviv
	Bondarchuk 43'	Report		Stadium: Ukraina; Attendance: 8,000; Referee: Ihor Khiblin (Khmelnytskyi)

16 February 1992	Dnipro Cherkasy (1L)	1 – 0	(1L) Veres Rivne	Cherkasy
	Ryabokon 55'	Report		Stadium: Spartak; Attendance: 2,500; Referee: Oleksandr Lytvynenko (Kyiv)

16 February 1992	Skala Stryi (1L)	1 – 0 (a.e.t.)	(PL) Nyva Vinnytsia	Stryi, Lviv Oblast
	Kovalyuk 97'; Kitsul (red card) 115'	Report		Stadium: Sokil; Attendance: 5,000; Referee: Ihor Bezuhlyi (Lutsk)

16 February 1992	Azovets Mariupol (1L)	bye

=== Bracket ===
Round of 32
Polissya Zhytomyr	1
Stal Alchevsk	0
Chornomorets
bye
Vahonobudivnyk	2
Avtomobilist Sumy	0
Metalurh Zaporizhia
bye
Torpedo Zaporizhia	3
SKA Odesa	0
Kryvbas Kryvyi Rih	2
Vorskla Poltava	1
Dynamo Kyiv
bye
Zorya-MALS Luhansk	1
Skala Stryi	2
Karpaty Lviv (p)	0 (4)
Dnipro Cherkasy	0 (2)
Shakhtar Donetsk
bye
Bukovyna (a.e.t.)	1
Azovets Mariupol	0
Dnipro
bye
Krystal Chortkiv	2
Shakhtar Pavlohrad	0
Metalist Kharkiv
bye
Naftovyk Okhtyrka	3
Tavriya Simferopol	1
Kremin Kremenchuk	2
Polihraftekhnika	0

Round of 16
Polissya Zhytomyr	4	1	5
Chornomorets (a.e.t.)	1	7	8
Vahonobudivnyk	1	0	1
Metalurh Zaporizhia	0	7	7
Torpedo Zaporizhia	6	0	6
Kryvbas Kryvyi Rih	0	1	1
Dynamo Kyiv (a.e.t.)	1	2	3
Skala Stryi	1	1	2
Karpaty Lviv	1	0	1
Shakhtar Donetsk	2	2	4
Bukovyna Chernivtsi	1	1	2
Dnipro Dnipropetrovsk	2	3	5
Krystal Chortkiv	1	0	1
Metalist Kharkiv	2	2	4
Naftovyk Okhtyrka	1	1	2
Kremin Kremenchuk	1	0	1

Quarterfinals
Chornomorets	2	1	3
Metalurh Zaporizhia	0	1	1
Torpedo Zaporizhia	1	1	2
Dynamo Kyiv	0	1	1
Shakhtar Donetsk	6	0	6
Dnipro Dnipropetrovsk	0	1	1
Metalist Kharkiv	2	0	2
Naftovyk Okhtyrka	0	1	1

Semifinals
Chornomorets	3	0	3
Torpedo Zaporizhia	1	0	1
Shakhtar Donetsk	0	1	1
Metalist Kharkiv	1	1	2

Final
Chornomorets (a.e.t.)	1
Metalist Kharkiv	0

=== Second round ===
Most of games took place on February 23, 1992. The game in Crimea between Polissia – Stal took place on February 21, 1992, and the game in Bukovyna between Bukovyna – Azovets took place on February 28, 1992.

21 February 1992	Polissia Zhytomyr (1L)	1 – 0	(1L) Stal Alchevsk	Alushta
	Strykharchuk 56'	Report		Stadium: Spartak; Attendance: 2,500; Referee: Volodymyr Tukhovskyi (Simferopol)

23 February 1992	Torpedo Zaporizhia (PL)	3 – 0	(PL) SKA Odesa	Zaporizhia
	Yakubovskyi 13'; Sydorkin 39'; Lyutyi 65'	Report		Stadium: Tsentralnyi of car manufacturer "Komunar"; Attendance: 3,000; Referee: Yevhen Kanana (Donetsk)

23 February 1992	Karpaty Lviv (PL)	0 – 0 (a.e.t.) (4–2 p)	(1L) Dnipro Cherkasy	Lviv
		Report		Stadium: Ukraina; Attendance: 4,500; Referee: Stepan Selmenskyi (Uzhhorod)
	Penalties
	Mokrytskyi (penalty scored); Leskiv (penalty scored); Tolochko (penalty scored); Benko (penalty scored); Bondarchuk (penalty missed)		(penalty scored) Krayniuk; (penalty scored) Sanytskyi; (penalty missed) Deineko; (penalty missed) Ryabokon

23 February 1992	Naftovyk Okhtyrka (PL)	3 – 1	(PL) Tavriya Simferopol	Okhtyrka
	Yaichnyk 15', 42'; Denysenko 80'	Report	Shevchenko (penalty missed) 40'; Gladyshev 48'	Stadium: Naftovyk; Attendance: 2,000; Referee: Volodymyr Pyanykh (Donetsk)

23 February 1992	Kryvbas Kryvyi Rih (1L)	2 – 1	(1L) Vorskla Poltava	Kryvyi Rih
	Selikhov 42', 82'	Report	Matyukha 48'	Stadium: Hirnyk; Attendance: 500; Referee: Serhiy Tatulyan (Kyiv)

23 February 1992	Krystal Chortkiv (1L)	2 – 0	(1L) Shakhtar Pavlohrad	Chortkiv
	Danylyshyn 1'; Mazur 58'	Report		Stadium: Kharchovyk; Attendance: 8,000; Referee: Mykhailo Sydor (Lviv)

23 February 1992	Vahonobudivnyk Stakhanov (1L)	2 – 0	(1L) Avtomobilist Sumy	Kadiivka
	Berezhnyi 30'; Sushko 70'	Report		Stadium: Vahonobudivnyk; Attendance: 3,000; Referee: Yevhen Yesin (Dnipro)

23 February 1992	Kremin Kremenchuk (PL)	2 – 0	(1L) Polihraftekhnika Oleksandriya	Kremenchuk
	Nemeshkalo 80'; Korponay 83'	Report		Stadium: Dnipro; Attendance: 5,000; Referee: Ihor Yarmenchuk (Kyiv)

23 February 1992	Zorya-MALS Luhansk (PL)	1 – 2	(1L) Skala Stryi	Oleksandrivsk
	Sevidov 57'	Report	Kardash 59', 75'	Stadium: Avanhard? Attendance: 500; Referee: Leonid Bavykin (Kharkiv)

28 February 1992	Bukovyna Chernivtsi (PL)	1 – 0 (a.e.t.)	(1L) Azovets Mariupol	Chernivtsi
	Sobotyuk 111'	Report		Stadium: Malva (Panchishnoho obyednannia); Attendance: 3,000; Referee: Yaroslav Hrysio (Lviv)

=== Round of 16 ===
Team 1	Agg.	Team 2	1st leg	2nd leg
First leg – February 28, Second leg – March 14
FC Dynamo Kyiv	3–2	FC Skala Stryi	1–1	2–1 (a.e.t.)
First leg – March 1, Second leg – March 14
FC Polissya Zhytomyr	5–8	FC Chornomorets Odesa	4–1	1–7 (a.e.t.)
FC Torpedo Zaporizhia	6–1	FC Kryvbas Kryvyi Rih	6–0	0–1
FC Karpaty Lviv	1–4	FC Shakhtar Donetsk	1–2	0–2
FC Krystal Chortkiv	1–4	FC Metalist Kharkiv	1–2	0–2
FC Naftovyk Okhtyrka	2–1	FC Kremin Kremenchuk	1–1	1–0
First leg – March 2, Second leg – March 14
FC Bukovyna Chernivtsi	2–5	FC Dnipro Dnipropetrovsk	1–2	1–3
First leg – March 3, Second leg – March 14
FC Vahonobudivnyk Stakhanov	1–7	FC Metalurh Zaporizhia	1–0	0–7

28 February 1992
?:?

Dynamo Kyiv (PL)	1–1	(1L) Skala Stryi
Tsveiba 37'	Report	Kardash 83'

Republican Stadium, Kyiv
Attendance: 1,300
Referee: Valeriy Avdysh (Simferopol)
14 March 1992
?:?

Skala Stryi (1L)	1 – 2 (a.e.t.)	(PL) Dynamo Kyiv
Sydorenko 43'	Report	Annenkov 52'; Salenko 100'

Sokil Stadium, Stryi
Attendance: 17,000
Referee: Valeriy Avdysh (Simferopol)

Dynamo won 3–2 on aggregate.

1 March 1992
15:00

Polissya Zhytomyr (1L)	4–1	(PL) Chornomorets Odesa
Shyshkov 10', 55'; Svystunov 22'; Strykharchuk 40' (pen.)	Report	Pindeyev 8'

Lenin's Komsomol Stadium, Zhytomyr
Attendance: 5,000
Referee: Yaroslav Lemekh (Lviv)
14 March 1992
15:00

Chornomorets Odesa (PL)	7 – 1 (a.e.t.)	(1L) Polissya Zhytomyr
Shelepnytsky 21' (pen.), 116'; Sak 33', 102'; Tretyak 56'; Husiev 64', 105'	Report	Baran 5'

Chornomorets Stadium, Odesa
Attendance: 1,500
Referee: Yevhen Kanana (Donetsk)

Chornomorets won 8–5 on aggregate.

1 March 1992
?:?

"Torpedo"(Zaporizhzhya) (PL)	6–0	(1L) "Kryvbas"(Kryvyi Rih)
Bondarenko 14', 20'; Zayets 21', 25', 48'; Volkov 70'	Report

AvtoZAZ Stadium, Zaporizhia
Attendance: 3,000
Referee: Ihor Yarmenchuk (Kyiv)
14 March 1992
?:?

Kryvbas Kryvyi Rih (1L)	1–0	(PL) Torpedo Zaporizhia
Popovych 82'	Report

Metalurh Stadium, Kryvyi Rih
Attendance: 500
Referee: Oleksiy Katsman (Kirovohrad)

Torpedo won 6–1 on aggregate.

1 March 1992	Karpaty Lviv (PL)	1–2	(PL) Shakhtar Donetsk	Lviv
?:?	Mokrytsky 68' (pen.)	Report	Popov 23'; Drahunov 71' (pen.)	Stadium: Ukraina Stadium; Attendance: 12,500; Referee: Oleksandr Dehtiariov (Odesa)

1 March 1992	Krystal Chortkiv (1L)	1–2	(PL) Metalist Kharkiv	Chortkiv
?:?	Mazur 10'	Report	Kolesnyk 40', 66'	Stadium: Kharchovyk Stadium; Attendance: 7,000; Referee: Valeriy Onufer (Uzhhorod)

1 March 1992	Naftovyk Okhtyrka (PL)	1–1	(PL) Kremin Kremenchuk	Yalta
?:?	Lipynsky 18'	Report	Lezhentsev 58'	Stadium: Avanhard Stadium; Attendance: 200; Referee: Kostiantyn Panchyk (Simferopol)

2 March 1992	Bukovyna Chernivtsi (PL)	1–2	(PL) Dnipro Dnipropetrovsk	Chernivtsi
?:?	Zadorozhniak 35'	Report	Bahmut 19'; Yudin 31'	Stadium: Bukovyna Stadium; Attendance: 4,500; Referee: Oleksandr Litvinenko (Kyiv)

3 March 1992	"Vahonobudivnyk"(Stakhanov) (1L)	1–0	(PL) "Metalurh"(Zaporizhia)	Kadiivka
?:?	Palamarchuk 43'	Report		Stadium: Vahonobudivnyk Stadium; Attendance: 2,000; Referee: Volodymyr Pyanykh (Donetsk)

==== Second leg ====
14 March 1992
?:?

"Metalurh"(Zaporizhia) (PL)	7–0	(1L) "Vahonobudivnyk"(Stakhanov)
Holovan 5', 18', 74'; Taran 38', 62', 85' (pen.); Skrypnyk 44'	Report

Metalurh Stadium, Zaporizhia
Attendance: 6,000
Referee: Volodymyr Tukhovsky (Simferopol)

Metalurh won 7–1 on aggregate.

14 March 1992
?:?

Shakhtar Donetsk (PL)	2–0	(PL) Karpaty Lviv
Shcherbakov 8'; Popov 75'	Report

Shakhtar Stadium, Donetsk
Attendance: 1,000
Referee: Kostiantyn Panchyk (Simferopol)

Shakhtar won 4–1 on aggregate.

14 March 1992
?:?

Dnipro Dnipropetrovsk (PL)	3–1	(PL) Bukovyna Chernivtsi
Moskvin 15'; Polunin 21'; Dumenko 58'	Report	Zhyrov 88'

Meteor Stadium, Dnipropetrovsk
Attendance: 1,500
Referee: Valeriy Lysenko (Odesa)

Dnipro won 5–2 on aggregate.

14 March 1992
?:?

Metalist Kharkiv (PL)	2–0	(1L) Krystal Chortkiv
Kandaurov 36'; Adzhoyev 47'	Report

Metalist Stadium, Kharkiv
Attendance: 1,500
Referee: Anatoliy Aranovsky (Kyiv)

Metalist won 4–1 on aggregate.

14 March 1992
?:?

Kremin Kremenchuk (PL)	0–1	(PL) Naftovyk Okhtyrka
	Report	Hrachov 55'

Dnipro Stadium, Kremenchuk
Attendance: 8,000
Referee: Serhiy Tatulian (Kyiv)

Naftovyk won 2–1 on aggregate.

=== Quarterfinals (1/4) ===
Team 1	Agg.	Team 2	1st leg	2nd leg
First leg – April 11, Second leg – April 28
FC Metalist Kharkiv	2–1	FC Naftovyk Okhtyrka	2–0	0–1
First leg – April 11, Second leg – May 3
FC Chornomorets Odesa	3–1	FC Metalurh Zaporizhia	2–0	1–1
FC Torpedo Zaporizhia	2–1	FC Dynamo Kyiv	1–0	1–1
FC Shakhtar Donetsk	6–1	FC Dnipro Dnipropetrovsk	6–0	0–1

11 April 1992
?:?

Metalist Kharkiv (PL)	2–0	(PL) Naftovyk Okhtyrka
Adzhoyev 43'; Kolesnyk 86'	Report

Metalist Stadium, Kharkiv
Attendance: 3,000
Referee: Anatoliy Popov (Kyiv)
28 April 1992
?:?

Naftovyk Okhtyrka (PL)	1–0	(PL) Metalist Kharkiv
Sukharev 89' (pen.)	Report

Naftovyk Stadium, Okhtyrka
Attendance: 3,100
Referee: Kostiantyn Panchyk (Simferopol)

Metalist won 2–1 on aggregate.

11 April 1992
?:?

"Chornomorets"(Odesa) (PL)	2–0	(PL) "Metalurh"(Zaporizhia)
Yablonskyi 10'; Husiev 72'	Report

Chornomorets Stadium, Odesa
Attendance: 1,700
Referee: Kostiantyn Panchyk (Simferopol)
3 May 1992
?:?

"Metalurh"(Zaporizhia) (PL)	1–1	(PL) "Chornomorets"(Odesa)
Sak 84' (o.g.); Sorokalet (penalty missed) 77'	Report	Tsymbalar 66'

Metalurh Stadium, Zaporizhia
Attendance: 5,000
Referee: Volodymyr Pyanykh (Donetsk)

Chornomorets won 3–1 on aggregate.

11 April 1992
?:?

"Torpedo"(Zaporizhzhya) (PL)	1–0	(PL) Dynamo Kyiv
Volkov 75'	Report

AvtoZAZ Stadium, Zaporizhia
Attendance: 8,000
Referee: Leonid Bavykin (Kharkiv)
3 May 1992
?:?

Dynamo Kyiv (PL)	1–1	(PL) Torpedo Zaporizhia
Yesipov 15'	Report	Zayets 59'

Dynamo Stadium, Kyiv
Attendance: 1,487
Referee: Yaroslav Hrysio (Lviv)

Torpedo won 2–1 on aggregate.

11 April 1992
?:?

Shakhtar Donetsk (PL)	6–0	(PL) Dnipro Dnipropetrovsk
Shcherbakov 3', 21'; Rebrov 29'; Pohodin 30', 87'; Martiuk 65'	Report

Shakhtar Stadium, Donetsk
Attendance: 1,313
Referee: Oleksandr Dehtiariov (Odesa)
3 May 1992
?:?

Dnipro Dnipropetrovsk (PL)	1–0	(PL) Shakhtar Donetsk
Konovalov 3'	Report

Meteor Stadium, Dnipropetrovsk
Attendance: 900
Referee: Valeriy Avdysh (Simferopol)

Shakhtar won 6–1 on aggregate.

=== Semifinals (1/2) ===
Team 1	Agg.	Team 2	1st leg	2nd leg
First leg – May 14, Second leg – May 26
FC Chornomorets Odesa	3–1	FC Torpedo Zaporizhia	3–1	0–0
FC Shakhtar Donetsk	1–2	FC Metalist Kharkiv	0–1	1–1

14 May 1992
?:?

"Chornomorets"(Odesa) (PL)	3–1	(PL) "Torpedo"(Zaporizhzhya)
Shelepnytsky 18'; Nikiforov 36'; Husiev 40'	Report	Zayets 19'

Chornomorets Stadium, Odesa
Attendance: 3,100
Referee: Yaroslav Hrysio (Lviv)
26 May 1992
?:?

"Torpedo"(Zaporizhzhya) (PL)	0–0	(PL) "Chornomorets"(Odesa)
	Report

AvtoZAZ Stadium, Zaporizhia
Attendance: 6,000
Referee: Valeriy Onufer (Uzhhorod)

Chornomorets won 3–1 on aggregate.

14 May 1992
?:?

Shakhtar Donetsk (PL)	0–1	(PL) Metalist Kharkiv
	Report	Kolesnyk 37'

Shakhtar Stadium, Donetsk
Attendance: 6,500
Referee: Valeriy Avdysh (Simferopol)
26 May 1992
?:?

Metalist Kharkiv (PL)	1–1	(PL) Shakhtar Donetsk
Kolesnyk 25'	Report	Fokin 2'

Metalist Stadium, Kharkiv
Attendance: 6,000
Referee: Yaroslav Hrysio (Lviv)

Metalist won 2–1 on aggregate.

=== Final ===
31 May 1992
19:00

Chornomorets Odesa (PL)	1–0 (a.e.t.)	(PL) Metalist Kharkiv
Tsymbalar 107'	Report

Republican Stadium, Kyiv
Attendance: 12,000
Referee: Yevhen Kanana (Donetsk)

Ukrainian Cup 1992 Winners

FC Chornomorets Odesa
First title

== Cup holders ==
(league appearances and goals listed in brackets)

FC Chornomorets Odesa

Goalkeepers: Viktor Hryshko (4 / -2), Oleh Suslov (2 / -1), Yevhen Nemodruk (1 / -4).
Defenders: Serhiy Tretiak (6 / 1), Yuriy Nikiforov (6 / 1), Dmytro Parfenov (6 / 0), Oleksandr Spitsyn (4 / 0), Yuriy Bukel (4 / 0), Andriy Telesnenko (1 / 0), Dmytro Demianenko (1 / 0), Volodymyr Kantsler (1 / 0), Ruslan Leskiv (1 / 0), Oleksandr Avdeyev (1 / 0).
Midfielders: Yuriy Shelepnytsky (6 / 3), Ilya Tsymbalar (6 / 2), Yuriy Sak (6 / 2),^{(1)} Viktor Yablonskyi (6 / 1), Oleh Koshelyuk (6 / 0), Sergei Zirchenko (5 / 0), Serhiy Protsyuk (3 / 0), Ruslan Romanchuk (1 / 0), Dmytro Horbatenko (1 / 0), Dmytro Kopetsky (1 / 0), Andriy Lozovsky (1 / 0), Vitaliy Kolesnichenko (1 / 0).
Forwards: Serhiy Husyev (6 / 4), Ivan Hetsko (5 / 0), Oleksandr Pindeyev (1 / 1), Oleh Mochulyak (1 / 0), Kostyantyn Kulyk (1 / 0), Andriy Savitsky (1 / 0).

Manager: Vitaliy Sidnev,^{(2)} Viktor Prokopenko.

Transferred out during the season: Oleksandr Pindeyev (FC Vorskla Poltava), Dmytro Demianenko (SK Odesa), Andriy Telesnenko ( (Finland) AC Oulu).

- ^1 Yuriy Sak also scored one own goal.
- ^2 In its first game against Pollisya Chornomorets played with its reserves led by Vitaliy Sidnev.
- Note: Only Bukel received a yellow card.

== Top goalscorers ==
Scorer	Goals	Team
(Ukraine) Oleksandr Zayets	6	Torpedo Zaporizhia
(Ukraine) Vadym Kolesnyk	5	Metalist Kharkiv
(Ukraine) Serhiy Husiev	4	Chornomorets Odesa
(Ukraine) Oleh Holovan	3	Metalurh Zaporizhia
(Ukraine) Yuriy Shelepnytskyi	3	Chornomorets Odesa
(Ukraine) Oleksandr Volkov	3	Torpedo Zaporizhia
(Ukraine) Yuriy Strykharchuk	3	Polissya Zhytomyr
(Ukraine) Volodymyr Konovalchuk	3	Kremin Kremenchuk
(Ukraine) Vasyl Kardash	3	Skala Stryi
(Ukraine) Viktor Danylyshyn	3	Krystal Chortkiv

.

== Goalkeeping leaders ==
Wins

Rank	Goalkeeper	Club	GP	MINS	GA	GAA	W–L–T	PS
1	(Ukraine) Ihor Moiseyev	Torpedo Zaporizhia	7		6	0.86	4–1–2	0–0
2	(Ukraine) Oleksandr Pomazun	Metalist Kharkiv	7		4	0.57	4–2–1	0–0
3	(Ukraine) Yuriy Prokhorov	Naftovyk Okhtyrka	4		2	0.50	3–0–1	0–0
3	(Ukraine) Viktor Hryshko	Chornomorets Odesa	4		2	0.50	3–0–1	0–0
5	(Ukraine) Dmytro Shutkov	Shakhtar Donetsk	6		4	0.67	3–2–1	0–0
6	(Ukraine) Valeriy Vorobyov	Kryvbas Kryvyi Rih	4		8	2.00	3–1–0	0–0
7	(Ukraine) Ihor Rutkovsky	Polissia Zhytomyr	4		9	2.25	3–1–0	0–0

== Attendances ==
=== Top attendances ===
Rank	Round	Home team	Away team	Result	Location	Attendance
1	Round of 16	Skala Stryi	Dynamo Kyiv	1 – 2 aet	Sokil Stadium, Stryi	17,000
2	Round of 16	Karpaty Lviv	Shakhtar Donetsk	1–2	Ukraina Stadium, Lviv	12,500
3	Final	Chornomorets Odesa	Metalist Kharkiv	1–0	Republican Stadium, Kyiv	12,000
4	Round of 16	Kremin Kremenchuk	Naftovyk Okhtyrka	0–1	Dnipro Stadium, Kremenchuk	8,000
4	Quarterfinals	Torpedo Zaporizhia	Dynamo Kyiv	1–0	AvtoZAZ Stadium, Zaporizhia	8,000

== Number of teams by region ==
Number	Region	Team(s)
4	Dnipropetrovsk Oblast	Dnipro Dnipropetrovsk, Kryvbas Kryvyi Rih, Shakhtar Pavlohrad and Metalurh Nikopol
4	Luhansk Oblast	Zorya-MALS Luhansk, Vahonobudivnyk Stakhanov, Khimik Severodonetsk and Stal Alchevsk
3	Lviv Oblast	Karpaty Lviv, Skala Stryi and Halychyna Drohobych
2	Donetsk Oblast	Shakhtar Donetsk and Azovets Mariupol
2	Khmelnytskyi Oblast	Temp Shepetivka and Podillya Khmelnytskyi
2	Kyiv	Dynamo and SKA
2	Mykolaiv Oblast	Evis Mykolaiv and Artania Ochakiv
2	Odesa Oblast	Chornomorets Odesa and SC Odesa
2	Poltava Oblast	Kremin Kremenchuk and Vorskla Poltava
2	Sumy Oblast	Naftovyk Okhtyrka and Avtomobilist Sumy
2	Ternopil Oblast	Nyva Ternopil and Krystal Chortkiv
2	Zakarpattia Oblast	Karpaty Mukachevo and Zakarpattia Uzhhorod
2	Zaporizhia Oblast	Metalurh Zaporizhia and FC Torpedo Zaporizhia
1	Cherkasy Oblast	Dnipro Cherkasy
1	Chernihiv Oblast	Desna Chernihiv
1	Chernivtsi Oblast	Bukovyna Chernivtsi
1	Crimea	Tavriya Simferopol
1	Ivano-Frankivsk Oblast	Prykarpattia Ivano-Frankivsk
1	Kharkiv Oblast	Metalist Kharkiv
1	Kherson Oblast	Krystal Kherson
1	Kirovohrad Oblast	Polihraftekhnika Oleksandriya
1	Kyiv Oblast	Ros Bila Tserkva
1	Rivne Oblast	Veres Rivne
1	Sevastopol	Chaika Sevastopol
1	Vinnytsia Oblast	Nyva
1	Volyn Oblast	Volyn Lutsk
1	Zhytomyr Oblast	Polissya Zhytomyr

== See also ==
- Ukrainian Premier League 1992
- Ukrainian First League 1992
