= 1990 USSR Federation Cup =

1990 Cup of Football Federation of USSR
USSR Federation Cup

Tournament details
- Host country: Soviet Union
- Dates: 28 May to 6 July
- Teams: 9
- Venues: 9 (in 9 host cities)

Final positions
- Champions: (Ukrainian Soviet Socialist Republic) Chernomorets Odessa (1st title)
- Runners-up: (Ukrainian Soviet Socialist Republic) Dnepr Dnepropetrovsk

Tournament statistics
- Matches played: 19
- Goals scored: 61 (3.21 per match)
- Top scorer: (3) - Aleksei Kobozev (Shakhter)

The 1990 USSR Federation Cup was the fifth and the last edition of the USSR Federation Cup and was officially known as Cup of the USSR Football Union. It was brief and took place between 28 May through 6 July. Its final was played at the Black Sea Steamship Central Stadium in Odessa.

== Group stage ==
=== Group A ===
Pos	Team	Pld	W	D	L	GF	GA	GD	Pts	DNE	CHO	ARA	MKH	SHD
1	(Ukrainian Soviet Socialist Republic) Dnepr Dnepropetrovsk	4	2	2	0	11	5	+6	6		x	8–3	x	1–0
2	(Ukrainian Soviet Socialist Republic) Chernomorets Odessa	4	2	1	1	6	5	+1	5	1–1		3–2	x	x
3	(Armenian Soviet Socialist Republic) Ararat Yerevan	4	2	0	2	11	11	0	4	x	x		4–0	2–0
4	(Ukrainian Soviet Socialist Republic) Metallist Kharkov	4	1	1	2	4	11	−7	3	1–1 (Note: game was played at Spartak Stadium in Kupyansk)	1–0	x		x
5	(Ukrainian Soviet Socialist Republic) Shakhter Donetsk	4	1	0	3	7	7	0	2	x	1–2	x	6–2	

Legend: Blue = home team win; Yellow = draw; Red = away team win.

=== Group B ===
Pos	Team	Pld	W	D	L	GF	GA	GD	Pts	RVO	DMI	PDU	CSM
1	(Russian Soviet Federative Socialist Republic) Rotor Volgograd	3	2	0	1	8	5	+3	4		3–1	x	4–0
2	(Byelorussian Soviet Socialist Republic) Dinamo Minsk	3	2	0	1	5	3	+2	4	x		2–0 (Note: game was played at Traktor Stadium in Minsk)	x
3	(Tajik Soviet Socialist Republic) Pamir Dushanbe	3	1	1	1	5	4	+1	3	4–1	x		x
4	(Russian Soviet Federative Socialist Republic) CSKA Moscow	3	0	1	2	1	7	−6	1	x	0–2	1–1	

Legend: Blue = home team win; Yellow = draw; Red = away team win.

== Knock-out stage ==
Semi-finals
28 June 1990
(Russian Soviet Federative Socialist Republic) Rotor Volgograd	0
(Ukrainian Soviet Socialist Republic) Chernomorets	1
28 June 1990
(Ukrainian Soviet Socialist Republic) Dnepr	1
(Byelorussian Soviet Socialist Republic) Dinamo Minsk	0

Final
6 July 1990
(Ukrainian Soviet Socialist Republic) Chernomorets	2
(Ukrainian Soviet Socialist Republic) Dnepr	0

=== Semifinals ===
28 June 1990

Rotor Volgograd (Russian Soviet Federative Socialist Republic)	0 – 1	(Ukrainian Soviet Socialist Republic) Chernomorets Odesa
	Report	Kondratyev 11'

Central Stadium, Volgograd
Attendance: 3,000
Referee: Andrei Butenko

28 June 1990

Dnepr Dnepropetrovsk (Ukrainian Soviet Socialist Republic)	1 – 0	(Byelorussian Soviet Socialist Republic) Dinamo Minsk
Bezhenar (penalty missed) 55'; Kudrytsky 75'	Report

Meteor Stadium, Dnipropetrovsk
Attendance: 1,000
Referee: A.Kartavtsev

=== Final ===
6 July 1990

Chernomorets Odessa (Ukrainian Soviet Socialist Republic)	2 – 0	(Ukrainian Soviet Socialist Republic) Dnepr Dnepropetrovsk
Spitsyn 47' (pen.); Hetsko 55'	Report

BSS Stadium, Odessa
Attendance: 3,100
Referee: Myroslav Stupar

(Ukrainian Soviet Socialist Republic); Chernomorets:
GK	Viktor Hryshko		(substituted off) 87'
DF	Serhiy Kuznetsov
MF	Yuriy Shelepnytskyi		(substituted off) 46'
DF	Vasyl Ishchak	Booked
DF	Serhiy Puchkov
DF	Oleksandr Spitsyn		(substituted off) 85'
MF	Ilya Tsymbalar		(substituted off) 85'
FW	Ivan Hetsko		(substituted off) 75'
MF	Oleg Imrekov
FW	Heorhiy Kandratsyew
MF	Ihor Savelyev
Substitutions:
DF	Yuriy Kulish		(substituted on) 46'
MF	Yuriy Nikiforov		(substituted on) 75'
MF	Serhiy Husyev		(substituted on) 85'
DF	Serhiy Tretyak		(substituted on) 85'
GK	Ihor Krapyvkin		(substituted on) 87'
Manager:Viktor Prokopenko
Assistant referees:

(Ukrainian Soviet Socialist Republic); Dnepr:
GK	Valeriy Horodov
DF	Andriy Yudin		(substituted off) 65'
DF	Volodymyr Herashchenko
DF	Andriy Sydelnykov	Booked
MF	Vadym Tyshchenko
MF	Mykola Kudrytsky	Booked
MF	Volodymyr Bahmut
MF	Yevgeniy Yarovenko	Booked
FW	Eduard Son		(substituted off) 75'
MF	Aleksandr Zhidkov		(substituted off) 46'
DF	Serhiy Bezhenar	Booked	(substituted off) 68'
Substitutes:
MF	Oleksiy Sasko		(substituted on) 46'
FW	Valentyn Moskvyn		(substituted on) 65'
MF	Serhiy Solovyov		(substituted on) 68'
FW	Yuriy Hudymenko		(substituted on) 75'
Manager:Yevhen Kucherevsky

== Top scorers ==
3 goals

- Aleksey Kobozev (Shakhter Donetsk)
- Mykola Kudrytskyi (Dnepr Dnepropetrovsk)
- Mikhail Markhel (Dinamo Minsk)
- Valentyn Moskvyn (Dnepr Dnepropetrovsk)
- Ivan Hetsko (Chernomorets Odessa)
