= 1990 Soviet Lower Second League, Zone 1 =

Football Championship of Ukrainian SSR
- Season: 1990
- Champions: Torpedo Zaporizhzhia
- Promoted: Torpedo Zaporizhzhia; Sudobudivnyk Mykolaiv
- Relegated: none
- Top goalscorer: 20 – Serhiy Morozov (Sudobudivnyk Mykolaiv)

1990 Football Championship of Ukrainian SSR was the 60th season of association football competition of the Ukrainian SSR, which at the time was a part of the Soviet Lower Second League. The Soviet Second League was split this season and all national (republican) competitions were placed at the lower league (4th division), while the upper league (3rd division) was transformed into a buffer league. The 1990 Football Championship of Ukrainian SSR was won for the first time by FC Torpedo Zaporizhzhia.

== Teams ==
=== Map ===
Locations of teams in Lower Second League, Zone 1

=== Promoted teams ===
- SKA Kyiv – Champion of the Fitness clubs competitions (KFK) (returning to professional level after an absence of 2 seasons)

=== Relegated teams ===
- None

=== Realigned teams ===
- FC Desna Chernihiv – Placed 17th in the Zone 5 of Second League, (returning to republican competitions after a year of absence)

== League standings ==
Pos	Team	Pld	W	D	L	GF	GA	GD	Pts	Promotion
1	Torpedo Zaporizhzhia	36	23	8	5	53	25	+28	54	Promoted
2	Sudnobudivnyk Mykolaiv	36	24	5	7	60	31	+29	53	Promoted
3	Avanhard Rivne	36	21	11	4	53	27	+26	53	
4	Polissya Zhytomyr	36	23	5	8	53	27	+26	51	
5	Krystal Kherson	36	18	9	9	61	44	+17	45	
6	Naftovyk Okhtyrka	36	17	10	9	45	29	+16	44	
7	Prykarpattia Ivano-Frankivsk	36	15	8	13	32	32	0	38	
8	Shakhtar Pavlohrad	36	14	9	13	37	39	−2	37	
9	Dynamo Bila Tserkva	36	14	7	15	37	38	−1	35	
10	Kolos Nikopol	36	13	9	14	43	40	+3	35	
11	SKA Kyiv	36	14	4	18	40	41	−1	32	
12	Desna Chernihiv	36	13	6	17	35	39	−4	32	
13	Chaika Sevastopol	36	11	8	17	35	46	−11	30	
14	Podillya Khmelnytskyi	36	10	10	16	37	46	−9	30	
15	Kryvbas Kryvyi Rih	36	10	6	20	40	53	−13	26	
16	Dnipro Cherkasy	36	8	7	21	26	48	−22	23	
17	Okean Kerch	36	7	9	20	31	55	−24	23	
18	Mayak Kharkiv	36	6	10	20	19	48	−29	22	
19	Zirka Kirovohrad	36	7	7	22	32	61	−29	21	

=== Top goalscorers ===
The following were the top ten goalscorers.

#	Scorer	Goals (Pen.)	Team
1	Serhiy Morozov	20	Sudobudivnyk Mykolaiv
2	Roman Bondarenko	19	Torpedo Zaporizhzhia
3	Yuriy Horyachev	15	Sudobudivnyk Mykolaiv
4	Anatoliy Lukashenko	14	Polissya Zhytomyr
4	Viktor Pobehayev	14	Dynamo Bila Tserkva
6	Eduard Denysenko	13	Zirka Kirovohrad
7	Yuriy Leonov	12	Polissya Zhytomyr
7	Viktor Yablonskyi	12	SKA Kyiv
9	Serhiy Hrozov	11	Krystal Kherson
9	Serhiy Dumenko	11	Shakhtar Pavlohrad
9	Pavlo Kasanov	11	Polissya Zhytomyr
9	Vadym Kolesnyk	11	Naftovyk Okhtyrka
9	Bohdan Samardak	11	Avanhard Rivne
9	Oleksandr Usatyi	11	Kryvbas Kryvyi Rih
9	Ihor Chetveryk	11	Desna Chernihiv

== See also ==
- Soviet Second League B
