= Georgy Kondratyev =

Belarusian football coach and player

Personal information
- Full name: Georgy Petrovich Kondratyev
- Date of birth: 7 January 1960 (age 66)
- Place of birth: Lyubanichi, Vitebsk Oblast, Byelorussian SSR, Soviet Union
- Height: 1.77 m (5 ft 10 in)
- Position: Striker

Senior career*
| Years | Team | Apps | (Gls) |
| 1978–1979 | Dvina Vitebsk | 82 | (22) |
| 1980–1988 | Dinamo Minsk | 211 | (66) |
| 1981 | → Dinamo Brest | 12 | (6) |
| 1989–1990 | Chornomorets Odesa | 52 | (20) |
| 1991 | Lokomotiv Moscow | 22 | (7) |
| 1991–1992 | St. Pölten | 12 | (3) |
| 1992 | Metallurg Molodechno | 19 | (4) |
| 1992–1993 | Temp Shepetivka | 28 | (15) |
| 1993 | Wismut Gera | 5 | (2) |
| 1994–1997 | KaIK Kaskinen | 79 | (69) |
| 1998 | Slavia Mozyr | 11 | (2) |
| Total | | 533 | (217) |

International career
| 1984–1986 | Soviet Union | 14 | (4) |

Managerial career
- 1998: Slavia Mozyr (assistant)
- 2000–2002: Dinamo Minsk (assistant)
- 2001: Dinamo Minsk (caretaker)
- 2003–2004: Lokomotiv Vitebsk
- 2005–2008: Smorgon
- 2006–2008: Belarus U21 (assistant)
- 2009–2011: Belarus U21
- 2011–2012: Belarus Olympic
- 2011–2014: Belarus
- 2015–2017: Minsk
- 2018: Belshina Bobruisk
- 2019: Neman Grodno (assistant)
- 2019–2021: Belarus (assistant)
- 2021–2023: Belarus
Medal record
Men's football
Representing Belarus (as manager)
UEFA European Under-21 Championship
| Bronze medal – third place | 2011 |
- * Club domestic league appearances and goals

Georgy Petrovich Kondratyev (Belarusian: Георгій Пятровіч Кандрацьеў; Russian: Георгий Петрович Кондратьев; born 7 January 1960) is a Belarusian football coach and former Belarusian and Soviet footballer. From 2011 to 2014 and 2021 to 2023, he was in charge of the Belarus national team. In 2018, he managed Belshina Bobruisk.

== International career ==
Kondratyev made his debut for the Soviet Union on 10 October 1984 in a 1986 FIFA World Cup qualifier against Norway. He scored 4 goals for the national team, including two in another World Cup qualifier, against Switzerland on 2 May 1985. He was however not selected for the World Cup squad.

== Career statistics ==
=== International ===
Appearances and goals by national team and year
| National team | Year | Apps | Goals |
|---|---|---|---|
| Soviet Union | 1984 | 1 | 0 |
| Soviet Union | 1985 | 10 | 4 |
| Soviet Union | 1986 | 3 | 0 |
| Total | | 14 | 4 |

Scores and results list Soviet Union's goal tally first, score column indicates score after each Kondratyev goal.

List of international goals scored by Georgy Kondratyev
| No. | Date | Venue | Opponent | Score | Result | Competition | Ref. |
|---|---|---|---|---|---|---|---|
| 1 | 4 February 1985 | Maharaja's College Stadium, Kochi, India | Yugoslavia | 2–1 | 2–1 | Friendly | |
| 2 | 2 May 1985 | Luzhniki Stadium, Moscow, Russia | Switzerland | 3–0 | 4–0 | 1986 FIFA World Cup qualification | |
| 3 | 2 May 1985 | Luzhniki Stadium, Moscow, Russia | Switzerland | 4–0 | 4–0 | 1986 FIFA World Cup qualification | |
| 4 | 30 October 1985 | Luzhniki Stadium, Moscow, Russia | Norway | 1–0 | 1–0 | 1986 FIFA World Cup qualification | |

=== Managerial ===
As of match played 19 June 2023

| Team | From | To | Record | | | | |
| Team | From | To | G | W | D | L | Win % |
|---|---|---|---|---|---|---|---|
| Belarus | July 2021 | June 2023 | 25 | 6 | 4 | 15 | 24.00 |
| Total | | | 25 | 6 | 4 | 15 | 24.00 |

== Honours ==
Dinamo Minsk

- Soviet Top League champion: 1982

Chornomorets Odesa

- USSR Federation Cup winner: 1990
