= Viktor Hryshko =

Ukrainian footballer (born 1961)

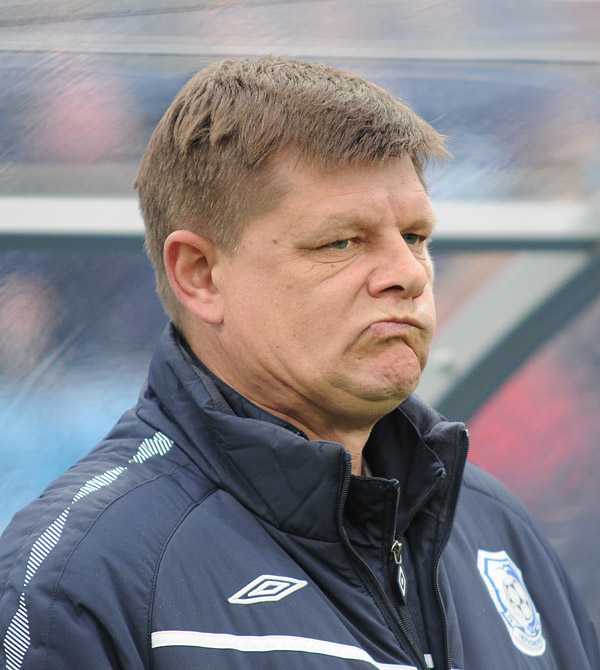

Personal information
- Full name: Viktor Vasylyovych Hryshko
- Date of birth: 2 November 1961 (age 64)
- Place of birth: Kryvyi Rih, Soviet Union (now Ukraine)
- Height: 1.92 m (6 ft 4 in)
- Position: Goalkeeper

Youth career
- ?: Spartak Ordzhonikidze

Senior career*
Years	Team	Apps	(Gls)
1979–1982	Dynamo Kyiv	0	(0)
1982	Metalist Kharkiv	12	(0)
1983–1984	Dynamo Kyiv	0	(0)
1985–1992	Chornomorets Odesa	205	(0)
1992–1995	Trabzonspor	58	(0)
1995	Rybak Odesa (amateurs)		
1995–1996	Mykolaiv	3	(0)
1996–1997	Dnister Ovidiopol (amateurs)	31	(0)
1997–1998	SKA-Lotto Odesa	12	(0)
1998	Dnister Ovidiopol (amateurs)	6	(0)
1998–2000	Chornomorets Odesa	29	(0)
1999	→ Chornomorets-2 Odesa	1	(0)
2000–2001	Dnister Ovidiopol (amateurs)		

Managerial career
- 2001–2003: Dnister Ovidiopol
- 2008–2009: Chornomorets Odesa
- * Club domestic league appearances and goals

Viktor Vasylyovych Hryshko (Ukrainian: Віктор Васильович Гришко; born 2 November 1961) is a Ukrainian coach and former Soviet and Ukrainian footballer.

== Career ==
He graduated from the Institute of Physical Education (Kyiv). As a Chornomorets player, in 1991 Hryshko became the best goalie in the Soviet Top League with the most shutout matches of "clean sheets". He was called to the Ukrainian football national team in 1992 by Viktor Prokopenko, but has never played a single game.

From the late 2003, until he was appointed as the interim coach of FC Chornomorets in late 2008, V. Hryshko worked as the administrative staff in the Odesa's club. Hryshko was given a permanent contract later that season, but was fired in August 2009 after a poor start to the following campaign. He was appointed as the vice-president of FC Chornomorets Odesa in September 2009.

== Honours ==
=== Player ===
- USSR Federation Cup 1990
- Ukrainian Cup 1992
- Turkish Cup 1995
