= Oleksandr Volkov =

Oleksandr Volkov may refer to:

- Alexander Volkov (basketball)
- Oleksandr Volkov (footballer, born 1961)
- Oleksandr Volkov (footballer, born 1989)
