= Yuriy Sak =

Ukrainian footballer and coach

Personal information
- Full name: Yuriy Mykolayovych Sak
- Date of birth: 3 January 1967 (age 59)
- Place of birth: Zaporizhzhia, Ukrainian SSR
- Height: 1.90 m (6 ft 3 in)
- Positions: Midfielder; defender

Team information
- Current team: Hirnyk-Sport Horishni Plavni (assistant)

Youth career
- FC Metalurh Zaporizhzhia

Senior career*
Years	Team	Apps	(Gls)
1983–1984	FC Metalurh Zaporizhzhia	0	(0)
1985–1986	FC Torpedo Zaporizhzhia	60	(6)
1987	Zirka Mykolaiv		
1988–1990	SKA Odesa	135	(14)
1991–1993	FC Chornomorets Odesa	88	(8)
1994	FC Spartak Moscow	2	(0)
1994	→ FC Spartak-d Moscow	10	(2)
1994–1997	FC Chornomorets Odesa	54	(7)
1997–1998	FC Metalurh Mariupol	31	(3)
1998–1999	Viktoriya Ivanivka		
1999	FC Krylia Sovetov Samara	28	(0)
2000	FC Chornomorets Odesa	14	(0)
2000	Signal Odesa		(0)
2000–2001	IRIK Odesa		(2)
2001–2002	FC Obolon Kyiv	41	(5)
2002	→ FC Obolon-2 Kyiv	3	(0)
2004	FC Ivan Odesa		

International career
1992–1994	Ukraine	10	(1)

Managerial career
- 2003: FC Lasunia Odesa
- 2003: FC Kryvbas Kryvyi Rih (assistant)
- 2004: FC Ivan Odesa
- 2004: FC Cherkasy (assistant)
- 2004–2005: FC Vorskla Poltava (assistant)
- 2005–2007: FC Dnipro Cherkasy (assistant)
- 2007: FC Stal Dniprodzerzhynsk (assistant)
- 2008: FC Arsenal Kharkiv (assistant)
- 2008: FC Hirnyk-Sport Komsomolsk
- 2009–2010: FC Zirka Kirovohrad (assistant)
- 2010–2011: FC Sumy (assistant)
- 2011: FC Zirka Kirovohrad (assistant)
- 2013–2016: FC Hirnyk-Sport Horishni Plavni (assistant)
- 2020–: FC Hirnyk-Sport Horishni Plavni (assistant)
- * Club domestic league appearances and goals

Yuriy Mykolayovych Sak (Ukrainian: Юрій Миколайович Сак; Russian: Юрий Николаевич Сак; born 3 January 1967) is a Ukrainian professional football coach and a former player.

== Club career ==
He made his professional debut in the Soviet Second League in 1985 for FC Torpedo Zaporizhzhia.

== International career ==
Sak won ten caps for the Ukraine.

=== International goals ===
#	Date	Venue	Opponent	Score	Result	Competition
1.	3 June 1994	Levski National Stadium, Sofia	Bulgaria	1–1	1–1	Friendly

== Honours ==
- Ukrainian Cup winner: 1992
- Ukrainian Premier League runner-up: 1994–95, 1995–96
- Ukrainian Premier League bronze: 1992–93
