= Oleksandr Pindyeyev =

Ukrainian footballer

Personal information
- Full name: Oleksandr Valeriyovych Pindyeyev
- Date of birth: 13 March 1971 (age 55)
- Place of birth: Odesa, Ukrainian SSR, Soviet Union
- Height: 1.78 m (5 ft 10 in)
- Position: Striker

Youth career
- Dzerzhyntes youth sports school
- 1990: Chornomorets Odesa

Senior career*
Years	Team	Apps	(Gls)
1991–1992	Chornomorets Odesa	4	(0)
1991–1992	→ FC Chornomorets-2 Odesa	8	(1)
1992–1993	FC Vorskla Poltava	58	(28)
1993–1994	FC Kremin Kremenchuk	19	(1)
1994	FC Vorskla Poltava	17	(6)
1995–1996	FC Skonto Riga	35	(20)
1997	FC Metallurg Lipetsk		
1997–1998	FC Skonto Riga	24	(5)
- * Club domestic league appearances and goals

Oleksandr Valeriyovych Pindyeyev (Russian: Олександр Валерійович Піндєєв; born 13 March 1975) is a Ukrainian retired football forward who last played for FC Vorskla Poltava.

- Champion of Latvia: 1995, 1996, 1997, 1998 (Skonto FC)
- Ukrainian Cup holder: 1992 (Chornomorets Odesa)
