= Oleksandr Zayets =

Ukrainian footballer (1962–2007)

Personal information
- Full name: Oleksandr Leonidovych Zayets
- Date of birth: 23 March 1962
- Place of birth: Velykyi Tokmak, Zaporizhzhia Oblast, Soviet Union
- Date of death: 29 April 2007 (aged 45)
- Place of death: Zaporizhzhia, Ukraine
- Height: 1.80 m (5 ft 11 in)
- Position: Striker

Youth career
- Tokmak sports school

Senior career*
Years	Team	Apps	(Gls)
1979	Metalist Kharkiv	7	(0)
1985	Torpedo Zaporizhzhia	28	(9)
1986–1991	Metalurh Zaporizhzhia	221	(46)
1992–1994	Torpedo Zaporizhzhia	55	(13)
1994	FC Polihraftekhika	2	(0)
1995	FC Torpedo Melitopol	37	(15)
1996–1998	FC Viktor Zaporizhzhia	34	(7)
- * Club domestic league appearances and goals

Oleksandr Zayets (23 March 1962 – 29 April 2007) was a Ukrainian footballer who played as a striker.

== Career ==
In 1990 Zayets earned the bronze medals of the Soviet First League when, while playing for FC Metalurh Zaporizhzhia, he earned a promotion to the Soviet Top League. During the 1992 season Zayets placed fourth among the Ukrainian Premier League goal scorers. Between 1986 and 1991, he played 221 games for Metalurh Zaporizhzhia, scoring 46 times. In 2007 Zayets died in a fire in Zaporizhzhia.

== Career statistics ==
Club	Season	League			Cup		Continental		Other		Total	
Club	Season	Division	Apps	Goals	Apps	Goals	Apps	Goals	Apps	Goals	Apps	Goals
Metallist Kharkov	1979	Pervaya Liga	7	0	0	0	0	0	0	0	7	0
Torpedo Zaporizhzhia	1985	Vtoraya Liga	28	9	0	0	0	0	0	0	28	9
Metallurh Zaporizhzhia	1986	Pervaya Liga	42	10	3	0	0	0	0	0	45	10
Metallurh Zaporizhzhia	1987	Pervaya Liga	37	5	2	1	0	0	0	0	39	6
Metallurh Zaporizhzhia	1988	Pervaya Liga	41	11	1	0	0	0	0	0	42	11
Metallurh Zaporizhzhia	1989	Pervaya Liga	41	8	4	2	0	0	0	0	45	10
Metallurh Zaporizhzhia	1990	Pervaya Liga	33	7	1	1	0	0	0	0	34	8
Metallurh Zaporizhzhia	1991	Vysshaya Liga	27	5	0	0	0	0	0	0	27	5
Torpedo Zaporizhzhia	1992	Vyshcha Liha	18	9	8	6	0	0	0	0	26	15
Torpedo Zaporizhzhia	1992–93	Vyshcha Liha	21	4	2	0	0	0	0	0	23	4
Torpedo Zaporizhzhia	1993–94	Vyshcha Liha	15	0	4	0	0	0	0	0	19	0
Torpedo Zaporizhzhia	1994–95	Vyshcha Liha	1	0	0	0	0	0	0	0	1	0
Polihraftekhnika Oleksandriya	1994–95	Persha Liha	2	0	0	0	0	0	0	0	2	0
Torpedo Melitopol	1994–95	Tretia Liha	17	10	0	0	0	0	0	0	17	10
Torpedo Melitopol	1995–96	Druha Liha	20	5	2	1	0	0	0	0	22	6
Viktor Zaporizhzhia	1995–96	Druha Liha	5	2	0	0	0	0	0	0	5	2
Viktor Zaporizhzhia	1997–98	Druha Liha	29	4	1	0	0	0	0	0	30	4
ZAlK Zaporizhzhia	1998–99	Amatorska Liha	0	0	0	0	0	0	3	1	3	1
