= Ihor Yakubovskyi =

Football Player

Personal information
- Full name: Ihor Kuzmych Yakubovskyi
- Date of birth: 29 January 1960 (age 66)
- Place of birth: Vilnius, Lithuanian SSR
- Height: 1.80 m (5 ft 11 in)
- Position: Midfielder

Youth career
- 1977–1980: Žalgiris Vilnius

Senior career*
Years	Team	Apps	(Gls)
1981	Žalgiris Vilnius	33	(4)
1982–1985	Metalist Kharkiv	83	(8)
1986	Dynamo Kyiv	0	(0)
1986–1990	Metalist Kharkiv	107	(11)
1990–1992	Torpedo Zaporizhia	53	(6)
1992–1993	SK České Budějovice	8	(0)
1993–1994	FK Jindřichův Hradec	?	(?)
1994	Temp Shepetivka	14	(0)
1995–1998	Polissia Zhytomyr	127	(31)
Total		425	(60)

Managerial career
- 1997–1998: Polissia Zhytomyr
- 1999–2000: Borysfen Boryspil (assistant)
- * Club domestic league appearances and goals

Ihor Kuzmych Yakubovskyi (Ukrainian: Ігор Кузьмич Якубовський; born 29 January 1960) is a Ukrainian and Soviet former professional football player and Ukrainian manager.

== Honours ==
- Soviet Cup winner: 1987–88.
