= Ilya Tsymbalar =

Ukrainian-Russian footballer (1969–2013)

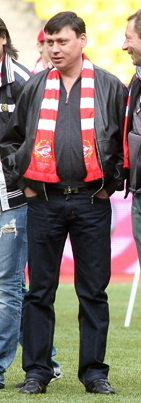
- Tsymbalar in 2012

Personal information
- Full name: Ilya Vladimirovich Tsymbalar
- Date of birth: 17 June 1969
- Place of birth: Odesa, Ukrainian SSR, Soviet Union
- Date of death: 28 December 2013 (aged 44)
- Place of death: Odesa, Ukraine
- Height: 1.74 m (5 ft 9 in)
- Position: Midfielder

Youth career
- 1977–1986: Chornomorets Odesa

Senior career*
Years	Team	Apps	(Gls)
1986	Chornomorets Odesa	0	(0)
1987	Dynamo Odesa		
1987–1989	SKA Odesa	83	(13)
1989–1993	Chornomorets Odesa	101	(14)
1993–1999	Spartak Moscow	146	(42)
1993–1994	Spartak-d Moscow	5	(1)
2000	Lokomotiv Moscow	10	(0)
2000	Lokomotiv-2 Moscow	5	(0)
2001–2002	Anzhi Makhachkala	16	(1)
Total		366	(71)

International career
1992	Ukraine	3	(0)
1994–1999	Russia	28	(4)

Managerial career
- 2003–2004: Spartak Moscow (U19)
- 2004–2006: Khimki (assistant)
- 2004: Khimki (caretaker)
- 2006: Spartak-MZhK Ryazan
- 2008–2009: Nizhny Novgorod
- 2010: Shinnik Yaroslavl (assistant)
- 2011: Khimki (assistant)
- * Club domestic league appearances and goals

Ilya Vladimirovich Tsymbalar (Russian: Илья Владимирович Цымбаларь, Ukrainian: Ілля Володимирович Цимбалар; 17 June 1969 – 28 December 2013) was a Ukrainian-Russian professional football player and coach. A midfielder, he represented both Ukraine and Russia on the international level. He primarily played as an attacking midfielder and was known for set-piece ability and technique.

== Career ==
After retiring, Tsymbalar became vice-president of Anzhi Makhachkala, before turning to coach by taking over Spartak's reserve team, moving on to the coaching team of Khimki. In 2006, he became head-coach of Spartak-MZhK Ryazan, whom he led to promotion to the Russian First Division. In February 2008, he was named as head coach of Nizhny Novgorod. In January 2009 he resigned from the club.

== Personal life and death ==
His son Oleg Tsimbalar was a professional footballer.

Tsymbalar died from heart disease on 28 December 2013.

== Career statistics ==
=== Club ===
Appearances and goals by club, season and competition
Club	Season	League			Cup		Continental		Other		Total	
Club	Season	Division	Apps	Goals	Apps	Goals	Apps	Goals	Apps	Goals	Apps	Goals
Chornomorets Odesa	1986	Soviet Top League	0	0	0	0	–		–		0	0
SKA Odesa	1987	Soviet Second League	20	2	0	0	–		–		20	2
SKA Odesa	1988	Soviet Second League	45	7	1	0	–		–		46	7
SKA Odesa	1989	Soviet Second League	18	4	2	0	–		–		20	4
SKA Odesa	Total		83	13	3	0	0	0	0	0	86	13
Chornomorets Odesa	1989	Soviet Top League	15	1	3	0	–		–		18	1
Chornomorets Odesa	1990	Soviet Top League	25	3	5	0	4 (Note: Appearances in the UEFA Cup)	1	6 (Note: Appearances in the USSR Federation Cup)	1	40	5
Chornomorets Odesa	1991	Soviet Top League	30	4	3	1	–		–		33	5
Chornomorets Odesa	1992	Ukrainian Premier League	17	5	6	2	–		–		23	7
Chornomorets Odesa	1992–93	Ukrainian Premier League	14	1	2	0	4 (Note: Appearances in the UEFA Cup Winners' Cup)	2	–		20	3
Chornomorets Odesa	Total		101	14	19	3	8	3	6	1	134	21
Spartak Moscow	1993	Russian Premier League	26	3	1	0	6 (Note: Appearances in the UEFA Champions League)	2	–		33	5
Spartak Moscow	1994	Russian Premier League	27	6	4	0	7	0	–		38	6
Spartak Moscow	1995	Russian Premier League	21	8	1	0	6	1	–		28	9
Spartak Moscow	1996	Russian Premier League	21	9	2	0	5 (Note: Two appearances in the UEFA Champions League, three appearances in the UEFA Cup)	0	–		28	9
Spartak Moscow	1997	Russian Premier League	11	4	2	0	3 (Note: Two appearances in the UEFA Champions League, one appearance in the UEFA Cup)	0	–		16	4
Spartak Moscow	1998	Russian Premier League	29	10	5	4	12 (Note: Four appearances in the UEFA Cup, eight appearances, five goals in the UEFA Champions League)	5	–		46	19
Spartak Moscow	1999	Russian Premier League	11	2	0	0	4	0	–		15	2
Spartak Moscow	Total		146	42	15	4	43	8	0	0	204	54
Spartak-d Moscow	1993	Russian Second League	4	1	1	0	–		–		5	1
Spartak-d Moscow	1994	Russian Third League	1	0	–		–		–		1	0
Spartak-d Moscow	Total		5	1	1	0	0	0	0	0	6	1
Lokomotiv Moscow	2000	Russian Premier League	10	0	3	2	1	1	–		14	3
Lokomotiv-2 Moscow	2000	Russian Second League	5	0	–		–		–		5	0
Anzhi Makhachkala	2001	Russian Premier League	8	0	2	0	1	0	–		11	0
Anzhi Makhachkala	2002	Russian Premier League	8	1	0	0	–		–		8	1
Anzhi Makhachkala	Total		16	1	2	0	1	0	0	0	19	1
Career total			366	71	43	9	53	12	6	1	468	93

=== International ===
Scores and results list Russia goal tally first, score column indicates score after each Tsymbalar goal.

List of international goals scored by Ilya Tsymbalar
No.	Date	Venue	Opponent	Score	Result	Competition
1	29 May 1994	Luzhniki Stadium, Moscow, Russia	Slovakia	2–1	2–1	Friendly
2	6 September 1995	Svangaskarð, Toftir, Faroe Islands	Faroe Islands	4–2	5–2	UEFA Euro 1996 qualifying
3	11 June 1996	Anfield, Liverpool, England	Italy	1–1	1–2	UEFA Euro 1996
4	31 March 1999	Lokomotiv Stadium, Moscow, Russia	Andorra	4–0	6–1	UEFA Euro 2000 qualifying

== Honours ==
Chornomorets Odesa

- Ukrainian Cup: 1992

Individual

- CIS Cup top goalscorer: 1995
