= Viktor Yablonskyi =

Ukrainian footballer (born 1970)

Personal information
- Full name: Viktor Viktorovich Yablonskyi
- Date of birth: 6 January 1970 (age 56)
- Place of birth: Kyiv, Ukrainian SSR
- Height: 1.85 m (6 ft 1 in)
- Positions: Midfielder; defender; forward

Youth career
- FC Dynamo Kyiv

Senior career*
Years	Team	Apps	(Gls)
1988	Avtomobilchi Kokand	8	(0)
1989–1990	SKA Kyiv	50	(15)
1991	Metalist Kharkiv	17	(3)
1992–1995	Chornomorets Odesa	55	(3)
1994	→ Chornomorets-2 Odesa	2	(1)
1994	→ SC Odesa (loan)	12	(1)
1995–1998	Baltika Kaliningrad	136	(7)
1999	Metallurg Lipetsk	41	(6)
2000	Arsenal Tula	33	(3)
2001–2002	Baltika Kaliningrad	29	(4)
2002	Vityaz Podolsk	1	(0)
2003	Neman Kaliningrad		

Managerial career
- 2003–2007: FC Baltika Kaliningrad (assistant)
- * Club domestic league appearances and goals

Viktor Viktorovich Yablonskyi (Ukrainian: Віктор Вікторович Яблонський; born 6 January 1970) is a Ukrainian football coach and a former player.

== Honours ==
Chornomorets Odesa

- Ukrainian Cup: 1992, 1993–94
- Ukrainian Premier League: runner-up 1994–95; bronze 1992–93, 1993–94
