= Vasyl Bondarchuk =

Ukrainian footballer (born 1965)

Personal information
- Full name: Vasyl Vasylyovych Bondarchuk
- Date of birth: 12 January 1965 (age 61)
- Place of birth: Korosten, Soviet Union (now Ukraine)
- Height: 1.72 m (5 ft 8 in)
- Positions: Midfielder; forward

Youth career
- Trudovi Rezervy Kyiv

Senior career*
Years	Team	Apps	(Gls)
1982	SKA Kyiv		
1982–1983	Papirnyk Malyn (amateurs)		
1983–1984	Spartak Zhytomyr	28	(1)
1984	Spartak Moscow	0	(0)
1985–1989	SKA-Karpaty Lviv	185	(28)
1990	Halychyna Drohobych	40	(3)
1991	Bukovyna Chernivtsi	39	(8)
1991	→ Dnipro Dnipropetrovsk (loan)	2	(0)
1992	Karpaty Lviv	15	(1)
1992–1994	Bukovyna Chernivtsi	50	(5)
1994	Avanhard Zhydachiv	7	(3)
1994	Krystal Chortkiv	19	(6)
1995	Karpaty Lviv	21	(1)
1995–1996	Zirka-NIBAS Kirovohrad	11	(0)
1996–1998	Podillya Khmelnytskyi	70	(18)
1999	Halychyna Drohobych	3	(0)
- * Club domestic league appearances and goals as of 1 July 2022

Vasyl Vasylyovych Bondarchuk (Ukrainian: Василь Васильович Бондарчук; born 12 January 1965) is a Ukrainian retired professional footballer who played as a midfielder and forward.

== Honours ==
Podillya Khmelnytskyi

- Ukrainian Second League, Group A: 1997–98
