= Ihor Rutkovskyi =

Soviet Ukrainian footballer

Personal information
- Full name: Ihor Volodymyrovych Rutkovskyi
- Date of birth: 28 March 1963 (age 63)
- Place of birth: Zhytomyr, Ukrainian SSR, Soviet Union
- Position: Goalkeeper

Youth career
- Polissya Zhytomyr football academy

Senior career*
Years	Team	Apps	(Gls)
1981–1983	Spartak Zhytomyr	46	(0)
1983–1985	SKA Karpaty Lviv	3	(0)
1986–1995	Polissya Zhytomyr	253	(0)

International career
1983	Ukraine	?	
- * Club domestic league appearances and goals

Ihor Volodymyrovych Rutkovskyi (born 28 March 1963) is an association footballer from the former Soviet Union.

== International career ==
In 1983, Rutkovskyi took part in the Summer Spartakiad of the Peoples of the USSR in the team of Ukrainian SSR.
