= Viktor Prokopenko =

Ukrainian footballer (1944–2007)

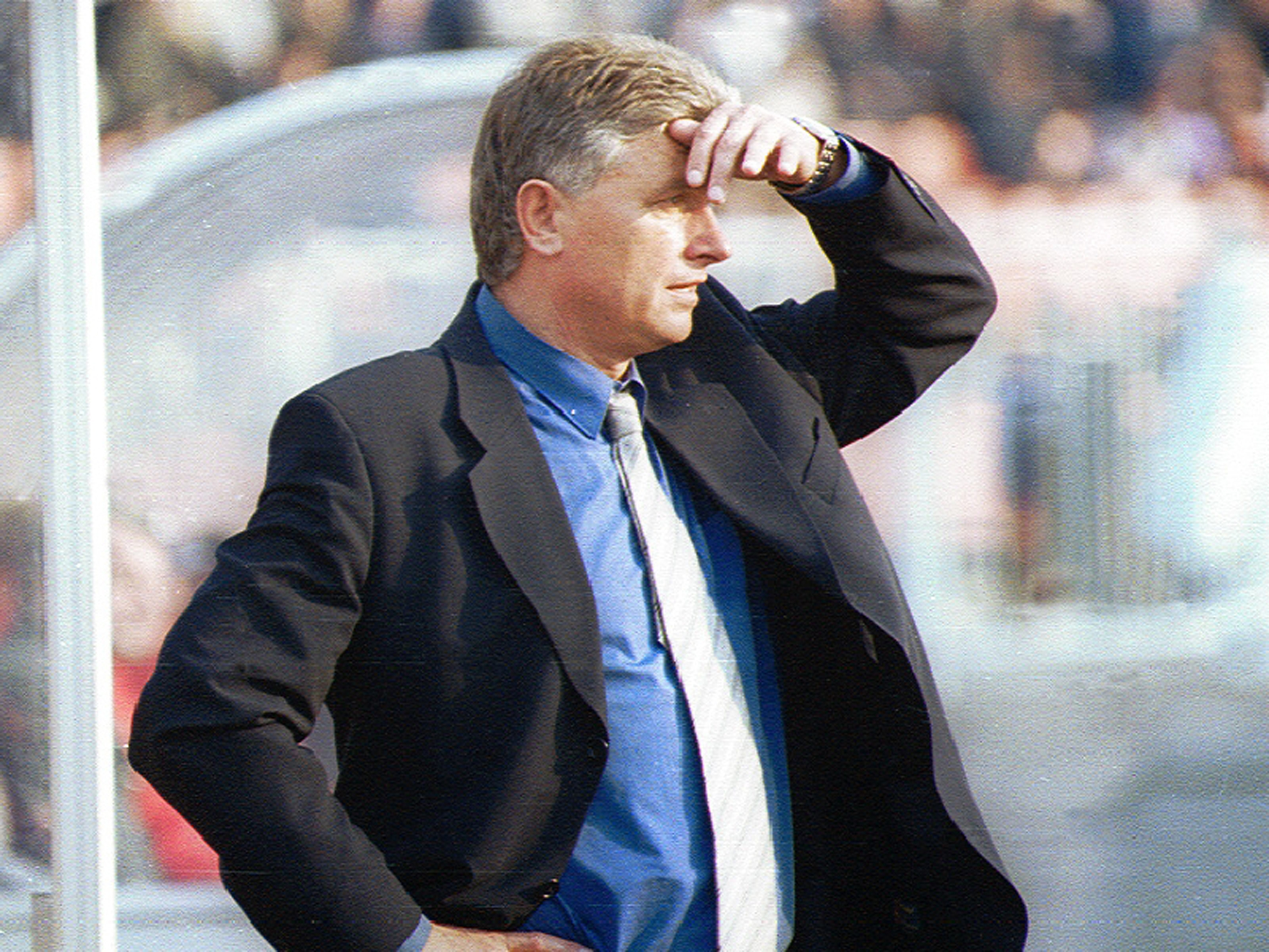

Personal information
- Full name: Viktor Yevhenovych Prokopenko
- Date of birth: 24 October 1944
- Place of birth: Zhdanov, Ukrainian SSR, Soviet Union
- Date of death: 18 August 2007 (aged 62)
- Place of death: Odesa, Ukraine
- Height: 1.86 m (6 ft 1 in)
- Position: Forward

Senior career*
Years	Team	Apps	(Gls)
1964–1967	GSFG team	?	(?)
1967–1968	Lokomotyv Vinnytsia	43	(5)
1969–1970	Chornomorets Odesa	49	(7)
1971–1973	Shakhtar Donetsk	45	(14)
1973–1974	Lokomotyv Kherson	?	(5)
1974–1975	Chornomorets Odesa	17	(2)

Managerial career
- 1982–1986: Chornomorets Odesa
- 1987–1988: Rotor Volgograd
- 1989–1994: Chornomorets Odesa
- 1992: Ukraine
- 1994–1999: Rotor Volgograd
- 2000–2001: Shakhtar Donetsk
- 2002–2003: Dynamo Moscow
People's Deputy of Ukraine
5th convocation
In office 25 May 2006 – 18 August 2007
Constituency	Party of Regions, No.45
- * Club domestic league appearances and goals

Viktor Prokopenko (Ukrainian: Віктор Прокопенко) (24 October 1944 – 18 August 2007) was a Ukrainian football player and coach who played for the Soviet occupational forces in East Germany and the Ukrainian SSR including teams of the Soviet Top League and later worked as a coach in Russia and Ukraine.

== Career ==
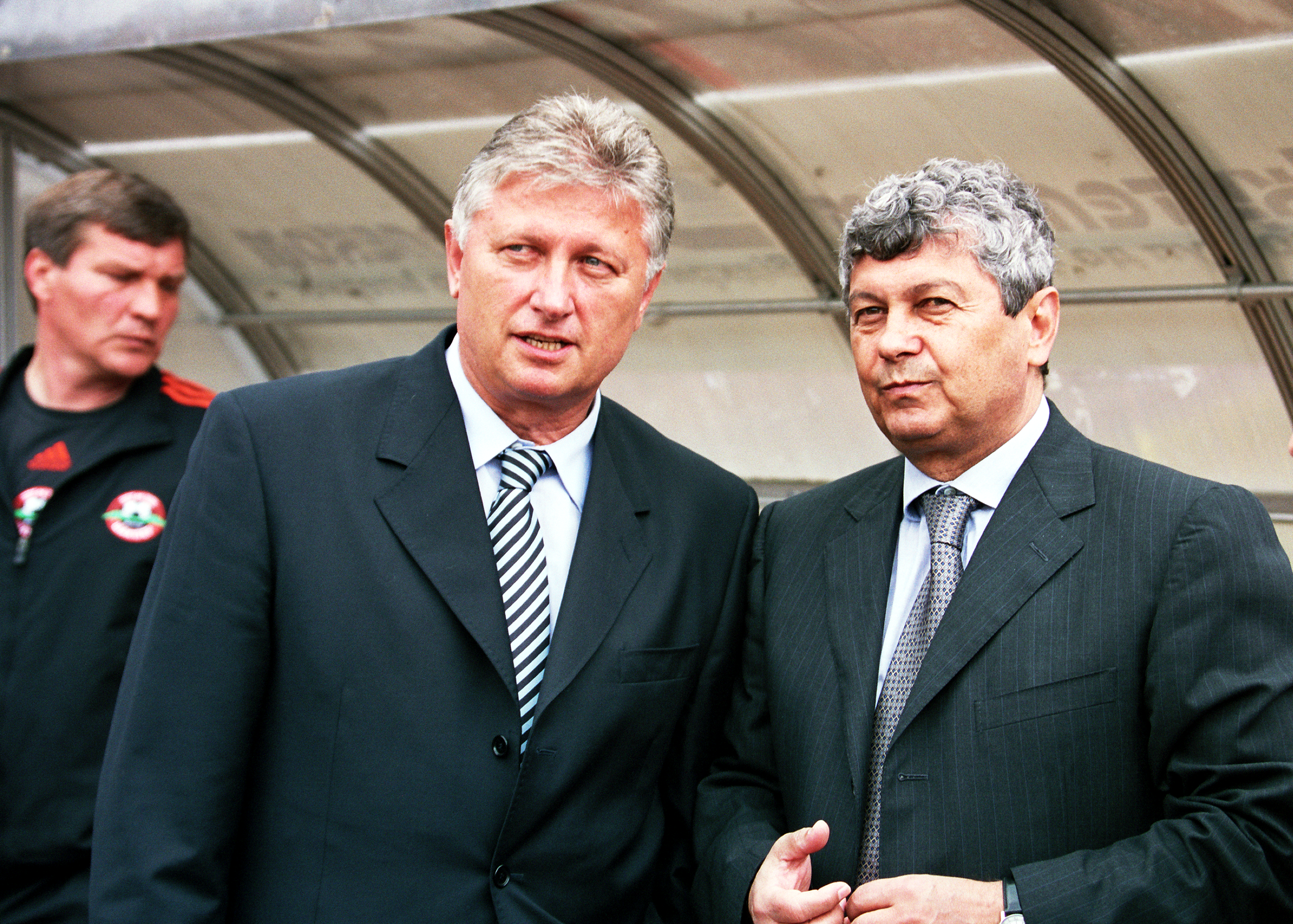
Prokopenko with Mircea Lucescu

Prokopenko was born in Zhdanov, Ukrainian SSR, now known as Mariupol, Ukraine. In 1975, he graduated from the Odessa State Pedagogical Institute of Ushynsky and later the Moscow Higher School of Coaches.

Prokopenko was the first manager of the Ukraine national team since dissolution of the Soviet Union. He also authored Flexibility, Strength, Endurance, a popular book on stretching.

Prokopenko was elected to the Ukrainian parliament for the Party of Regions as no.45 on their election list in the 2006 Ukrainian parliamentary election.

Prokopenko died from a fall in Odesa. He was 62 years old.

== Managerial statistics ==
As of match updated 12 September 2023

Team	From	To	Record				
Team	From	To	G	W	D	L	Win %
Ukraine	29 April 1992	26 August 1992	3	0	1	2	0.00
Total			3	0	1	2	0.00

== Honours ==
=== Chornomorets Odesa ===
- USSR Federation Cup: 1990
- Ukrainian Cup: 1992, 1993–94

=== Shakhtar Donetsk ===
- Ukrainian Cup: 2000–01

== See also ==
- List of members of the Verkhovna Rada of Ukraine who died in office
