= Oleksandr Volkov (footballer, born 1961) =

Soviet footballer and Ukrainian football manager

Personal information
- Full name: Oleksandr Mykolayovych Volkov
- Date of birth: 10 February 1961 (age 65)
- Place of birth: Zhdanov, Ukrainian SSR, Soviet Union
- Height: 1.83 m (6 ft 0 in)
- Position: Midfielder

Team information
- Current team: Mariupol (U-21 assistant)

Youth career
- Zhdanov sports school

Senior career*
Years	Team	Apps	(Gls)
1979	Novator Zhdanov	15	(3)
1983–1984	Novator Zhdanov	57	(8)
1985–1986	Amur Komsomolsk-na-Amure	35	(8)
1987–1989	Novator Mariupol	139	(34)
1990–1996	Torpedo Zaporizhzhia	186	(13)
1996–1997	Zirka-NIBAS Kirovohrad	21	(1)
1997–1999	Metalurh Nikopol	62	(1)
Total		515	(68)

Managerial career
- 2003–2008: Illichivets-2 Mariupol (assistant)
- 2008–2009: Illichivets Mariupol (U-21)
- 2009–2010: Illichivets Mariupol (administrator)
- 2010: Illichivets Mariupol (assistant)
- 2010: Illichivets Mariupol
- 2011–2016: Illichivets Mariupol (U-21)
- 2016–2017: Illichivets-2 Mariupol
- 2017–: Mariupol (U-21 assistant)
- * Club domestic league appearances and goals

Oleksandr Volkov (Ukrainian: Олександр Миколайович Волков; born 10 February 1961) is a former Soviet footballer and Ukrainian football manager.
