= Serhiy Husyev =

Ukrainian footballer (born 1967)

Serhiy Husyev Сергій Гусєв
Personal information
- Full name: Serhiy Yevhenovych Husyev
- Date of birth: 1 July 1967 (age 59)
- Place of birth: Odesa, Ukrainian SSR
- Height: 1.82 m (6 ft 0 in)
- Position: Striker

Senior career*
Years	Team	Apps	(Gls)
1984–1985	Chornomorets Odesa	0	(0)
1985–1987	SKA Odesa	79	(21)
1988–1989	Chornomorets Odesa	25	(1)
1989	SKA Odesa	32	(9)
1990–1991	Chornomorets Odesa	14	(2)
1991	Tiligul Tiraspol	36	(25)
1992–1993	Chornomorets Odesa	46	(24)
1993	Trabzonspor	1	(0)
1993–1994	Altay	19	(5)
1994–1996	Hapoel Be'er Sheva	38	(15)
1997	Gazovik-Gazprom Izhevsk	16	(5)
1997–1998	Hapoel Be'er Sheva	8	(1)
1998	SC Odesa	31	(15)
1999	Zirka Kirovohrad	12	(1)
1999	→ Zirka-2 Kirovohrad	1	(0)
1999–2001	FC Syhnal Odesa		
2001	Dniester Ovidiopol	13	(7)
2002–2003	FC Syhnal Odesa		

International career
1992–1993	Ukraine	5	(0)
- * Club domestic league appearances and goals

Serhiy Yevhenovych Husyev (Ukrainian: Сергій Євгенович Гусєв; Russian: Серге́й Евгеньевич Гусев; born 1 July 1967) is a Ukrainian retired professional footballer. A striker, he was the Ukrainian top goalscorer in the second championship of 1992–93.
