= Vadym Kolesnyk =

Ukrainian footballer (born 1967)

Vadym Kolesnyk Вадим Колесник
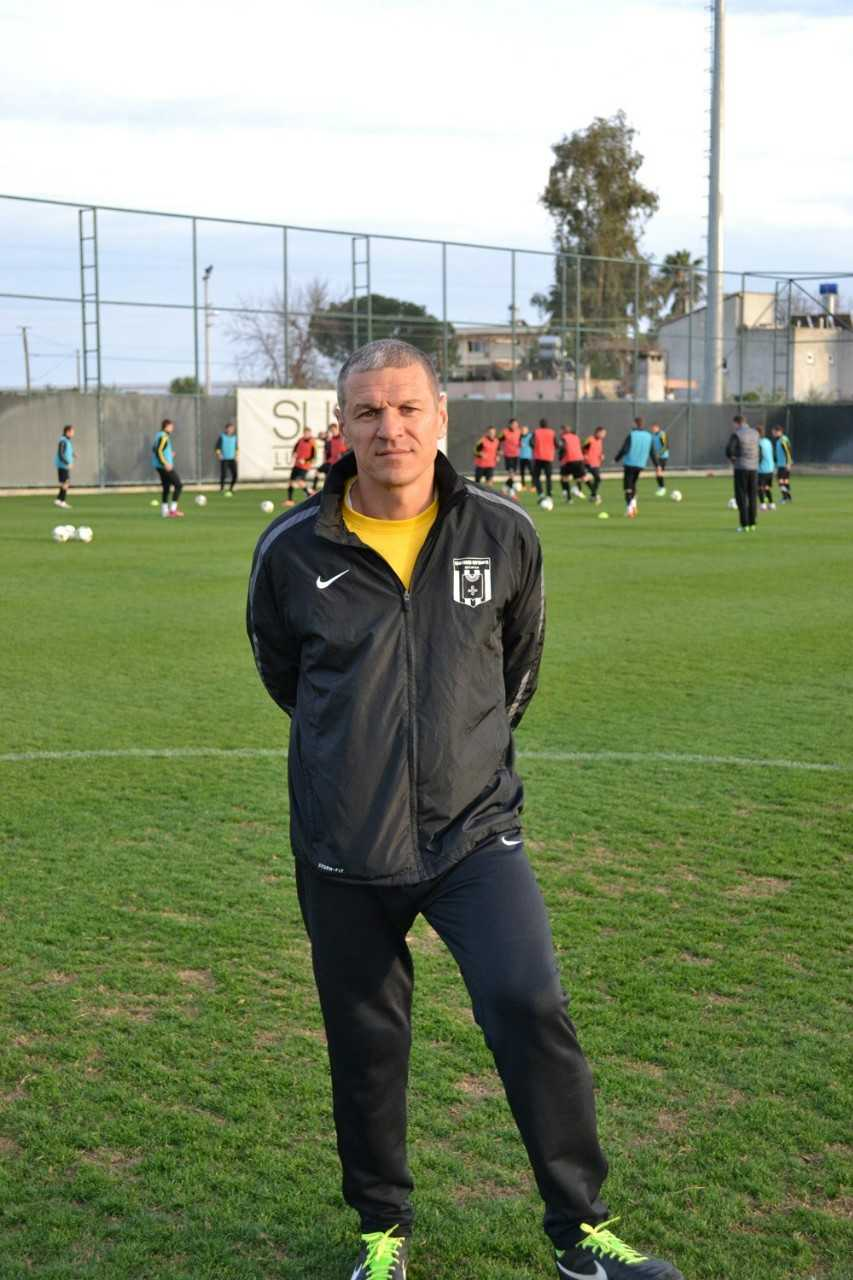

Personal information
- Full name: Vadym Leonidovych Kolesnyk
- Date of birth: 12 March 1967 (age 59)
- Place of birth: Chudniv, Ukrainian SSR, Soviet Union
- Height: 1.85 m (6 ft 1 in)
- Position: Forward

Team information
- Current team: Naftovyk-Ukrnafta Okhtyrka (assistant)

Youth career
- Sports school

Senior career*
Years	Team	Apps	(Gls)
1987–1990	Naftovyk Okhtyrka	142	(31)
1991–1995	Metalist Kharkiv	87	(23)
1993–1994	→ Hapoel Kfar Saba (loan)	5	(1)
1995–1997	Karpaty Lviv	60	(15)
1997	→ Karpaty-2 Lviv (loan)	2	(0)
1997–1998	Metalurh Mariupol	23	(2)
1998	→ Shakhtar Makiivka (loan)	3	(1)
1998–2003	Naftovyk Okhtyrka	108	(16)
1999–2000	→ Elektron Romny (loan)	2	(0)
2001–2002	→ Elektron Romny (loan)	2	(0)
2002–2003	→ Naftovyk-2 Okhtyrka (loan)	12	(1)

Managerial career
- 2003–2013: Naftovyk-Ukrnafta Okhtyrka (assistant)
- 2009: Naftovyk-Ukrnafta Okhtyrka (interim)
- 2011: Naftovyk-Ukrnafta Okhtyrka (interim)
- 2013–2015: Naftovyk-Ukrnafta Okhtyrka
- 2015–: Naftovyk-Ukrnafta Okhtyrka (assistant)
- * Club domestic league appearances and goals

Vadym Leonidovych Kolesnyk (Ukrainian: Вадим Леонідович Колесник; born 12 March 1967) is a Ukrainian football coach and former player.

== Playing career ==
Kolesnyk started out at a sports school and his first coach was his father Leonid Kolesnyk. He graduated from the Sumy State Pedagogical University of Makarenko. He played as a forward.

== Coaching career ==
After Kolesnyk retired from playing football in 2003, he was invited to work as an assistant coach in 2003.

On 5 November 2011, he became the new interim head coach of Naftovyk-Ukrnafta Okhtyrka in the Ukrainian First League.
