= Yuriy Shelepnytskyi =

Ukrainian footballer (born 1965)

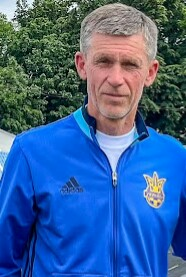

Personal information
- Full name: Yuriy Hryhorovych Shelepnytskyi
- Date of birth: 18 January 1965 (age 61)
- Place of birth: Luzhany, Ukrainian SSR
- Height: 1.80 m (5 ft 11 in)
- Positions: Defender; midfielder

Senior career*
Years	Team	Apps	(Gls)
1983–1988	Bukovyna Chernivtsi	243	(18)
1989–1992	Chornomorets Odesa	81	(5)
1992–1993	Trabzonspor	24	(2)
1994–1996	Altay	76	(4)
1996	Bukovyna Chernivtsi	13	(0)
1996–1998	Denizlispor	55	(4)
1998–2002	Bukovyna Chernivtsi	79	(3)
2002	Kalynivskyi rynok Chernivtsi		
2003–2004	Bukovyna Chernivtsi	26	(0)
2010	Dnister Doroshivtsi		

International career
1992	Ukraine	1	(0)

Managerial career
- 2002–2003: Bukovyna Chernivtsi
- 2004–2007: Bukovyna Chernivtsi
- 2015–2016: Mayak Velykyi Kuchuriv
- * Club domestic league appearances and goals

Yuriy Hryhorovych Shelepnytskyi (Ukrainian: Юрій Григорович Шелепницький; born 18 January 1965) is a Ukrainian professional football coach and a former player.

== Career ==
Shelepnytskyi made his professional debut in the Soviet Second League in 1983 for Bukovyna Chernivtsi.

Shelepnytskyi is known as the first captain of the Ukraine national team in its history.

== Honours ==
- Ukrainian Cup winner: 1992.
