= USSR Federation Cup =

- Founded: 1986
- Region: Soviet Union
- Teams: 16
- Most championships: Dnipro Dnipropetrovsk (2 titles)
- discontinued

The USSR Federation Cup (Note: Russian: Кубок Федерации футбола СССР, romanized: Kubok Federatsii futbola SSSR, Azerbaijani: SSRİ Futbol Federasiyasının Kuboku, Kazakh: КСРО футбол федерациялары кубогы, romanized: KSRO fwtbol federacïyaları kwbogı, Lithuanian: TSRS Futbolo Lygos Taurė, Romanian: Cupa Federației de Fotbal a URSS, Ukrainian: Кубок Федерації футболу СРСР, romanized: Kubok Federatsiï futbolu SRSR) was the official name for a short-lived premier Soviet football (soccer) competition similar to the USSR Cup that exclusively featured Soviet Top League competitors. For short it was called the "Federation's Cup".

== Overview ==
The All-Union Committee of Physical Culture and Sports Tournament in 1952 can be considered first example of a league cup in the Soviet Union. Initially planned earlier in 1940 as an elimination tournament of the group's A and B teams, the actual tournament took place already after the World War II. The USSR Federation Cup was comparable to the English League Cup which allows only clubs from the FA Premier League and The Football League. The competition was disbanded upon the break-up of the Soviet Union and in 1991 was not conducted as by the end of the season the Soviet Union fell apart. The Federation's Cup lasted for five years from 1986 through 1990 and basically served as an extension of the football season after the league's reduction from 18 to 16 participants following 1986. Its first edition consisted of a brief calendar and most of its participants played three games. The following editions had their calendar extended to double this by splitting it where the early stage would start in spring and then qualified teams would continue to compete playing in fall. The competition was a mix of a league format and a straight elimination cup-like format at later stages. After 1987 the league format was conducted in spring, while the best two teams from each group would qualify to quarterfinals which would start sometime in fall. The last edition (in 1990) was cut short substantially as a lot of participants did not only quit this competition, but also would withdraw out of the Football Federation of the Soviet Union.

Ukrainian clubs have the largest number of cups won with three, Russia and Kazakhstan have one each. Dnipro Dnipropetrovsk was the only club to win the cup twice.

== All-Union Committee Cup ==
- 1940 All-Union Committee of Physical Culture and Sports Cup (cancelled)
- 1952 All-Union Committee of Physical Culture and Sports Tournament

== Other Football Federation cups ==
- 1965 Football Federation and Komsomol Cup
- 1967 Podsnezhnik tournament
- 1968 Podsnezhnik tournament
- 1969 Podsnezhnik tournament
- 1977 Football Federation and Sovetskiy Sport Cup

== Football Federation Cup Finals ==
Year	Location	Winner	Score	Runner-up
1986	(Moldavian Soviet Socialist Republic) Chișinău, Stadionul Republican	(Ukrainian Soviet Socialist Republic) Dnipro Dnipropetrovsk	2–0	(Russian Soviet Federative Socialist Republic) Zenit Leningrad
1987	(Russian Soviet Federative Socialist Republic) Moscow, SC Olympic	(Russian Soviet Federative Socialist Republic) Spartak Moscow	4–1	(Ukrainian Soviet Socialist Republic) Metalist Kharkiv
1988	(Moldavian Soviet Socialist Republic) Chișinău, Stadionul Republican	(Kazakh Soviet Socialist Republic) Kairat Almaty	4–1	(Azerbaijan Soviet Socialist Republic) Neftchi Baku
1989	(Ukrainian Soviet Socialist Republic) Dnipropetrovsk, Meteor Stadium	(Ukrainian Soviet Socialist Republic) Dnipro Dnipropetrovsk	2–1	(Byelorussian Soviet Socialist Republic) Dinamo Minsk
1990	(Ukrainian Soviet Socialist Republic) Odessa, Chornomorets Stadium	(Ukrainian Soviet Socialist Republic) Chornomorets Odesa	2–0	(Ukrainian Soviet Socialist Republic) Dnipro Dnipropetrovsk
