= FC Chornomorets Odesa =

Professional association football club based in Odesa, Ukraine

Chornomorets Odesa
- Full name: Футбольний Клуб «Чорномо́рець» Одеса; Football Club Chornomorets Odesa
- Nicknames: Моряки (The Sailors); Чудо (The Miracle); Чорно-Сині (The black and blue)
- Short name: FCCO
- Founded: 26 March 1936; 90 years ago
- Ground: Chornomorets Stadium
- Capacity: 34,164
- Owner: Vertex United (100%) (Note: since 1 January 2022)
- President: Oleksandr Hranovskyi
- Head coach: Roman Hryhorchuk (Note: since 14 January 2026)
- League: Ukrainian Premier League
- 2025–26: Ukrainian First League, 2nd of 16 (promoted)
- Website: chornomorets.ua
| Home colours | Away colours | Third colours |

FC Chornomorets Odesa (Ukrainian: Футбо́льний Клуб Чорномо́рець Оде́са [tʃornoˈmɔretsʲ oˈdɛsɐ]) is a Ukrainian professional football club based in Odesa, Ukraine.

According to the club's website, it was formed in 1936 as Dynamo. However, the Odesa city Dynamo sports society and its football team were established in 1926 and were based on the local football team Sparta. Since the late 1920s, Dynamo Odesa participated in various "departamental" competitions organized by the republican and the All-Union Dynamo associations. In addition to that in 1992 to 2002, Chornomorets Odesa carried a logo with 1958 and 1959 listed as the club's year of foundation on its shield. Created in 1992, the club's shield is very similar to the shield of Romanian FC Farul Constanța.

Chornomorets is the first club in the modern history of Ukraine to win the Ukrainian Cup (1992), and also repeated this success in the 1993–94 season.

For over 30 years, the club was sponsored by the Black Sea Shipping Company (1959–1991). The club was among the top 20 Soviet clubs that competed in the Soviet Top League. The club's home ground, Chornomorets Stadium, opened in 2011.

== History ==
=== Naming history ===
Officially in the Soviet Union, Ukrainian teams carried both names in Russian and Ukrainian.

- 1926: Club formed FC Dynamo Odesa (out of Sparta Odesa)
- 1936: Dynamo was admitted to the All-Union competitions
- 1936: KinAp Odesa entered league competitions at republican level (Ukraine)
- 1938: Pischevik / Kharchovyk Odesa entered league competitions at republican level (Ukraine)
- 1940: Dynamo football team dissolved; its players joined Kharchovyk, which was admitted to the All-Union competitions
- 1941: Club renamed Spartak Odesa
- 1942: World War II (club was dissolved)
- 1944: Club revived as Dynamo Odesa which qualified for final stage of the Cup of the Ukrainian SSR
- 1945: Club reformed as Kharchovyk Odesa admitted to the All-Union competitions
- 1950: Kharchovyk relegated and dissolved
- 1951: Metalurh Odesa (team of Kim Fomin) promoted to the All-Union competitions
- 1955: Club split, reviving Kharchovyk Odesa in the All-Union competitions (in place of Metalurh, while Metalurh continued to play at republican level)
- 1958: Club renamed Chornomorets Odesa as part of the Odesa Rope Factory

=== Black Sea (pre-history) ===
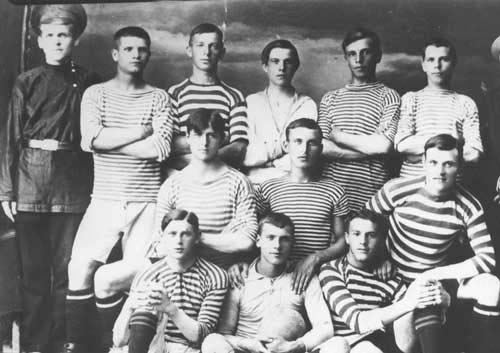
Non-league team "Chorne More", 1916. From left to right: 1st row (standing) - Shcherbakov, Sadkevych, Getsman, Belzhetsky, Koval, Mikhailov, 2nd row - ..., Mishin, 3rd row - ..., Tipikin, Bard.

At the beginning of the 20th century, in Odesa, within the limits of Alexander Park (today Shevchenko Park), construction began on what was supposed to become a pond. However, after the pond pit was dug, funding stopped, and so did construction. Soon, the depression began to be used as a field for one of the city's non-league teams. As the hole resembled a shape of the Black Sea, that was the nickname given to the field, and the team was named "Чорне море" Chorne more. And although that team is unrelated to the today's club, it was the first team in Odesa to play under that name.

==== Dynamo and previous names ====
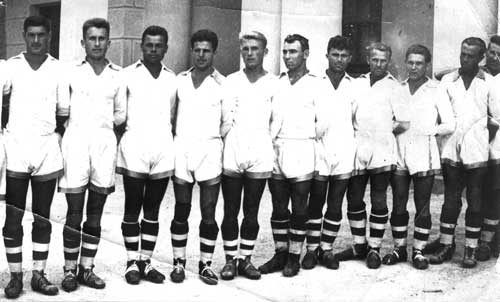
Dynamo Odesa players before the start of the first USSR football championship, 1936. From left to right: Litvachuk, Sositsky, Kusinsky, Kalashnikov, Khizhnikov, Kravchenko, Heison, M. Gichkin, Orekhov, Straub, Volin

The official date of foundation of Chornomorets Odesa is considered to be 26 March 1936 as Dynamo Odesa. Dynamo Odesa, however, participated before that in the city championship since 1923 (the year of establishment of the Ukrainian football competitions) winning it in 1933. Dynamo Odesa itself was first called Spartak Odesa until 1926. In 1940, after relegating from the Top level, the club was merged with Kharchovyk Odesa that participated in the republican competitions (Championship of Ukrainian SSR) and replaced Dynamo in next competitions. In 1941, the club was reformed again when it was included into the War Championship (Top division) under the name of Spartak Odesa.

Concurrently in league competitions of the Ukrainian SSR, since 1936 in Odesa played another team Kharchovyk Odesa.

Until Chornomorets Odesa was bought out by Leonid Klimov sometime in 2001, the club's foundation was considered to be 1958.

==== Post-WWII and Kharchovyk / Pischevik ====
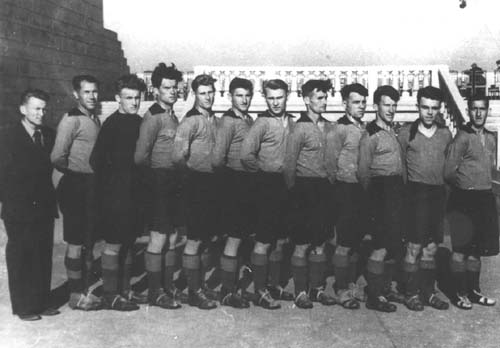
«Kharchovyk» (Odesa), 1947. From left to right: head coach Fomin, Bragin, Blyzinsky, Pukhovsky, Chubinsky, Shumilov, Khizhnikov, Chirklis, Boginsky, Potapov, Cherkassky, Spivak.

After World War II, the club was reestablished as Kharchovyk Odesa in the lower Soviet division (Class B). In 1950, the club lost its place in the play-offs to Spartak Uzhhorod (Zakarpattia Uzhhorod) and was dissolved. In 1953, upon the enlargement of the "Class B" competitions (Second division), the city of Odesa was represented by Metalurh (in Class B 1953, 1954), which was soon replaced again by the already more familiar Kharchovyk Odesa. In 1957–58, the Avanhard sports society was established, which adopted several other smaller societies in Ukraine under its umbrella. In 1958, the Odesa city team adopted the name Chornomorets and represented the city's Rope Factory.

==== Chornomorets (Black Sea Shipping Company) ====
In 1959, Chornomorets was handed over to the Black Sea Shipping Company which was a member of Vodnik sports society. Since then its emblem corresponded with the main emblem of Vodnik society. In 1960, Chornomorets was only in 4th place in its zone. That same year, the Odessa "national" team defeated Inter Milan 5:1 in a friendly match in Odesa.

In 1974, the club became the bronze medalist of the USSR championship. Chornomorets started well in the championship and was able to develop this success, for some time it was even in second place in the standings. The successful game of the "sailors" was based on the active actions of the midfield and defense, the loss of Anatoliy Shepel was felt in the attack, an equivalent replacement for whom was never found. Thus, defender Viktor Zubkov scored six goals in the championship, and midfielder Vladimir Makarov - thirteen, which allowed him to become the team's top scorer.

In the last season of the Soviet Top League, Chornomorets earned fourth place, the only time it ever placed above the big clubs in Ukraine, Dynamo Kyiv, Shakhtar Donetsk and Dnipro Dnipropetrovsk.

=== Recent history ===
The club was a founding member of the Ukrainian Premier League, winning the Ukrainian Cup and finishing 5th in the inaugural 1992 season. Chornomorets finished 3rd the next two seasons and 2nd during the following two seasons. They also won another domestic Cup in 1994. The club's most successful spell was achieved under the guidance of Viktor Prokopenko, and later under Leonid Buryak. At the end of the 1997–98 season, following big financial troubles and the sale of a number of leading players, the club was relegated to the First League.

They won promotion the following 1998–99 season, but finished in the second last place next year and were relegated again. Sometimes in 2001, the Klimov's Primorie company which owned SC Odesa along with Imexbank acquired the city's main team. In 2002 SC Odesa was merged with Chornomorets. Chornomorets came back up again for the 2002–03 season and enjoyed several decent seasons in the Premier League. They finished third in the 2005–06 season and took part in the 2006–07 UEFA Cup tournament.

Chornomorets were deducted 6 points by FIFA on 6 November 2008. It was confirmed by Ukrainian Premier League on 2 March 2009. The club managed to finish the 2008–09 season in 10th place despite the deduction. The 2009–10 season started badly with a 5–0 loss to Dynamo Kyiv and a poor run of form that saw the team finish the first half of the season in 13th place, just two spots away from the relegation zone. The club was relegated to the First League at the end of the season. It took, however, just a year for Chornomorets to return to the Ukrainian top flight for the 2011–12 season.

Following a loss in relegation playoffs on 27 May 2018 Chornomorets fans attacked the head coach of the club.

== Stadium and infrastructure ==
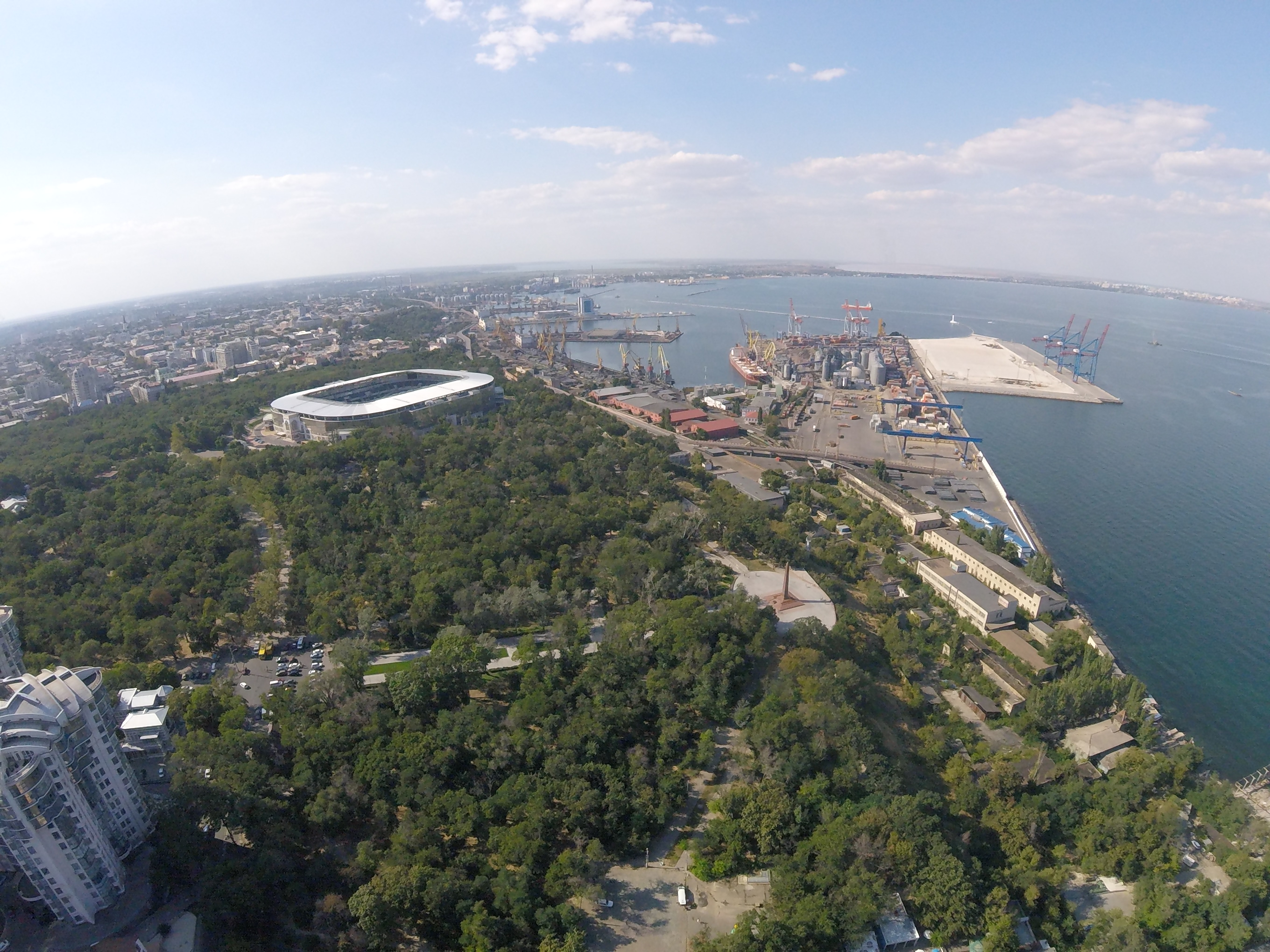
Location of Chornomorets Stadium

The main stadium of the club is traditionally considered Chornomorets Stadium, which until 2012 was called the Central Stadium of the Black Sea Shipping Company. Until the late 1990s, both the stadium and the teams of masters were part of the Black Sea Shipping Company. The stadium is located in the Shevchenko Park.

Among other stadiums Chornomorets also used Stadion "Dnister" imeni V.Dukova (2004–2005, reserves) in Ovidiopol at the Dnister Liman, Spartak Stadium (2005–2006, reserves) in Odesa, Chornomorets Training Base in Lymanka (2006–2007, reserves).

In 2006, FC Chornomorets opened its training grounds in one of the Odesa city microdistricts, Lustdorf (Liustdorf).

=== Academy ===
In 1979, the Soviet team of masters established its football academy, which for that purpose was served by the local specialized sports school of Olympic reserve. In 2005, it was named after its founder and former footballer, Anatoly Zubrytsky.

== Crest and colours ==
=== Crest ===
The club's emblem dates back to the Union of Labor Black Sea Cities, whose official colors were blue, black, and white. Until 1992, the main elements of the Chornomorets' older logo were a ship's wheel and sea waves, relating to the Black Sea Shipping Company. In the 1990s, the club's logo was completely redesigned, starting to look like the logo of FCV Farul Constanța.

According to heraldic canons, the elements of the crest mean:

- Blue color – symbolizes generosity, honesty, loyalty, and impeccability, or simply the sky.
- Black and white colors – mean two elements: earth and air.
- Seagull – means pride.

Crests of FC Chornomorets Odesa
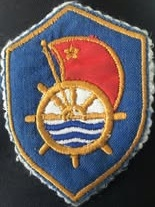
Used on the team's shirts
1958–1991

Used in the
mass media
1958–1991

Using since 2004

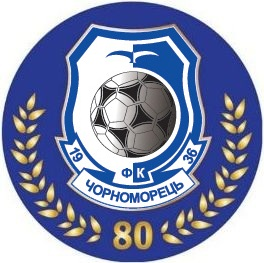
Created for the club's 80th anniversary

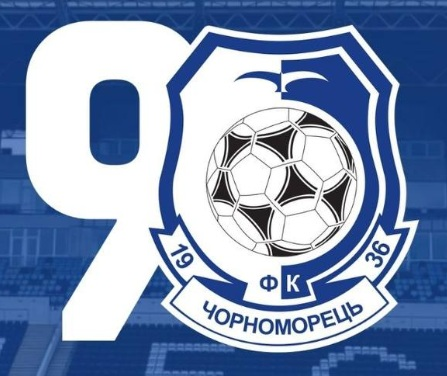
Created for the club's 90th anniversary

=== Colours ===
| Period | Kit manufacturer | First kit | Second kit | Third kit | Goalkeeper (Kit 1) | Goalkeeper (Kit 2) | Goalkeeper (Kit 3) |
|---|---|---|---|---|---|---|---|
| 2015–2016 | (Italy) Legea | | | - | | | |
| 2016–2017 | (Italy) Legea | | | - | | | |
| 2017–2018 | (Italy) Legea | | | - | | | |
| 2018–2019 | (Italy) Legea | | | | | | |
| 2019–2020 | (Italy) Legea | | | | | | |
| 2020–2021 | (Italy) Legea | | | | | | |
| 2021–2022 | (Spain) Kelme | | | - | | | |
| 2022–2023 | (Spain) Kelme | | | - | | | |
| 2023–2024 | (Spain) Kelme | | | | | | |
| 2024–2025 | (Spain) Kelme | | | - | | | |
| 2025–2026 | (Spain) Kelme | | | | | | |
| 2026–2027 | (Spain) Kelme | | | | | | |

=== Kit sponsors and suppliers ===
Only the main sponsors on the chest are marked in bold. Chornomorets' kit was produced by local manufacturers until 1970, when Adidas became the first kit supplier.

| Period | Sponsors (Note: Sponsor names) (Note: Only the title sponsor is marked in bold.) on the chest | Sponsors on the sleeves | Sponsors on the back | Sponsors on the shorts |
|---|---|---|---|---|
| 1958–1989 | (Soviet Union) BLASCO | | | |
| 1989–1990 | (Japan) Nisso Boeki | | | |
| 1990–1991 | (Soviet Union) BLASCO | | | |
| 1992–1994 | (United States) Pony | | | |
| 1994–1997 | (Germany) Reusch | | | |
| 1997–1999 | (Germany) Puma | | | |
| 2001–2014 | (Ukraine) Imexbank | | | |
| 2015 | (United Arab Emirates) Euphoria Trading FZE | | | |
| 2015–2017 | (Ukraine) 2+2 | | | |
| 2017–2021 | (Ukraine) Gefest | | | |
| 2021–2022 | (Cyprus) Parimatch, (Ukraine) Tavria V | | Parimatch | Tavria V |
| 2022–2023 | Parimatch, (United States) Allrise Capital, Tavria V | (Armenia) vbet | Parimatch, (Ukraine) MTB Bank | Tavria V |
| 2023–2024 | **vbet**, Tavria V | (Armenia) vbet | Allrise Capital, MTB Bank | Tavria V |
| 2024–2025 | **vbet**, Tavria V | (Ukraine) UPL.TV | MTB Bank | Tavria V |
| 2025–2026 | **vbet**, Tavria V | vbet | MTB Bank | Tavria V |
| 2026–2027 | (Ukraine) **BETON**, (Ukraine) Pharmacy 9-1-1, Tavria V | UPL.TV, (Ukraine) ТОЧКА. | MTB Bank | Tavria V |

| Period | Kit supplier |
|---|---|
| 1936–1970 | unidentified |
| 1970–1980 | (Germany) Adidas |
| 1992–1994 | (United States) Pony |
| 1994–1997 | (Germany) Reusch |
| 1997–1999 | (Germany) Puma |
| 1999–2002 | (Germany) Adidas |
| 2002–2010 | (United Kingdom) Umbro |
| 2010–2016 | (United States) Nike |
| 2016–2021 | (Italy) Legea |
| 2021– | (Spain) Kelme |

== Competition summary ==
As of 24 August 2026

- 25 participations in Soviet Top League
- 48 participations in Soviet Cup
- 9 participations in Football Cup of the Ukrainian SSR
- 29 participations in Ukrainian Premier League
- 7 participations in Ukrainian First League
- 36 participations in Ukrainian Cup
- 1 participation in Ukrainian Super Cup
- 2 participations in UEFA Cup Winners' Cup
- 8 participations in UEFA Cup / UEFA Europa League
- 1 participation in UEFA Intertoto Cup

=== Domestic League history ===
The scheme below shows performance of a team which carried names Kharchovyk (Pischevik) and Chornomorets (Chernomorets) only.

==== Ukraine ====
* UPL – Ukrainian Premier League

=== Domestic achievements ===
==== League hounors ====
- Ukrainian Premier League (Level 1)
  - Runners-up (2): 1994–95, 1995–96
  - Third place (3): 1992–93, 1993–94, 2005–06
- Ukrainian First League (Level 2)
  - Runners-up (5): 1998–99, 2001–02, 2010–11, 2020–21, 2025–26
- Soviet Top League (Level 1)
  - Third place (1): 1974
- Soviet First League (Level 2)
  - Winners (3): 1961, 1973, 1987
  - Runners-up (1): 1962
- Ukrainian SSR Championship (Level varied)
  - Winners (2): 1941, 1961
  - Runners-up (3): 1936 (spring), 1937 (spring), 1962

==== Cup hounors ====
- Ukrainian Cup
  - Winners (2): 1992, 1993–94
  - Runners-up (1): 2012–13
- Ukrainian Super Cup
  - Runners-up (1): 2013
- Soviet Top League Cup
  - Winners (1): 1990
- Ukrainian SSR Cup
  - Runners-up (1): 1947

=== International achievements ===
- UEFA Intertoto Cup
  - Runners-up (1): 2007

== Honours ==
| Type | Competition | Titles | Seasons |
|---|---|---|---|
| Domestic | Soviet First League | 3 | 1961, 1973, 1987 |
| Domestic | Soviet Top League Cup | 1 | 1990 |
| Domestic | Ukrainian Cup | 2 | 1992, 1993–94 |

== Alley of Football Glory ==
On September 1, 2012, the Alley of Glory (Ukrainian: Алея Слави), as a commemorative site of the FC Chornomorets Odesa former footballers, was solemnly opened near the central arch of the Chornomorets Stadium in Odesa. The site is located within Shevchenko Park, next to the western entrance to the stadium. On the day of the opening, eleven nameplates in Russian language with memorable "stars" were laid in honor of those who made a great contribution to the success of the Sailors' team — Viktor Prokopenko, Tymerlan Huseynov, Volodymyr Ploskina, Akhmed Aleskerov, Igor Belanov, Vasyl Moskalenko, Konstantin Furs, Anatoly Zubrytsky, Yuriy Zabolotny, Semen Altman, Leonid Sevasteyev. Another plate is dedicated to the "12th player" — loyal fans of "Chornomorets" Odesa of all time.

The decision to include someone in the Alley is made by the public council of JSC 'FC Chornomorets' by voting on the proposal of the club administration. The decision is preceded by studying the opinions of fans, journalists, the city's sports community, and public organizations. In 2012, residents of Odessa were invited to participate in discussions about the candidates for receiving a personalized star and a commemorative certificate. For this purpose, a vote was organized on the official website of FC "Chornomorets". The addition of signs to the Alley is usually carried out on dates timed to coincide with City Day (September 2). Individuals eligible for placement on the Alley include players, coaches, and staff who have made a significant contribution to the development and establishment of FC Chornomorets through their work, as well as those awarded state and sports honors or honorary sports titles.

Exactly one year later, on September 1, 2013, two nameplates were added in honor of Viktor Hryshko and Igor Sokolovsky. On February 19, 2014, two more plates were added to the Alley of Glory in honor of Valeriy Porkujan and Roman Hryhorchuk. On September 13, 2014, four new nameplates appeared on the walk in honor of Ilya Tsymbalar, Vyacheslav Leshchuk, Matvey Cherkassky and Vasyl Ishchak.

On September 13, 2015, the Alley of Glory was replenished with two new nameplates in honor of Leonid Buryak and Volodymyr Nechayev. On September 11, 2016, two new nameplates appeared on the walk in honor of Volodymyr Sokolov and Vitaly Serafimov. In September 2017, two nameplates in honor of Viktor Zubkov and Oleksandr Ruga replenished the walk. A year later (2018), a nameplate in honor of Volodymyr Fink appeared on the walk. On September 17, 2023, the alley of fame was replenished with two new nameplates in honor of Oleksandr Degtyarev and Oleksandr Polishchuk. On 14 September 2024, before the match of the 6th round of the 2024–25 Ukrainian Premier League between FC Chornomorets and FC Inhulets on the Alley of Glory was held a solemn ceremony of opening a new nameplate in honor of Anatoliy Doroshenko. On September 13, 2025, a new nameplate appeared on the walk in honor of Edward Luchin. On September 2, 2026, a new nameplate appeared on the walk in honor of Grigory Bibergal.

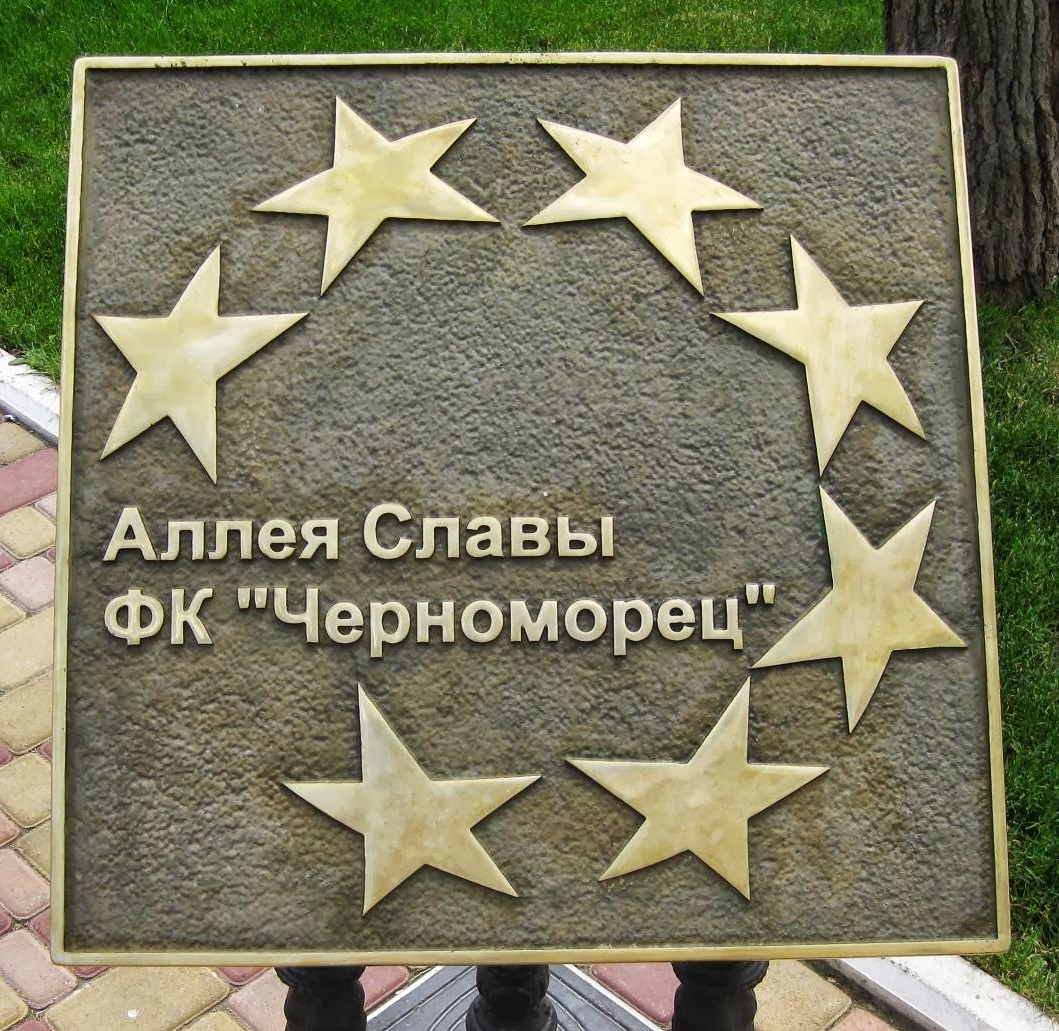
| Starting point of the Alley of Glory |

== Players ==
=== Current squad ===
As of 26 October 2026 (Note: The list includes players who have been signed by the club and/or who were part of the first team squad for at least one official match (domestic league/cup) in the current season.)
Note: Flags indicate national team as defined under FIFA eligibility rules; some limited exceptions apply. Players may hold more than one non-FIFA nationality.

| No. | Pos. | Nation | Player |
|---|---|---|---|
| 4 | DF | UKR | Mahomed Kratov |
| 5 | DF | UKR | Vasyl Kurko (captain) |
| 7 | FW | UKR | Danyil Alefirenko |
| 8 | MF | UKR | Dmytro Klyots |
| 9 | FW | UKR | Andriy Khoma |
| 10 | MF | UKR | Artur Avahimyan (vice-captain) |
| 11 | FW | UKR | Kiril Popov |
| 12 | GK | NGR | Chijioke Aniagboso |
| 13 | MF | UKR | Vitaliy Farasyeyenko |
| 16 | GK | UKR | Nazar Bayda |
| 17 | MF | UKR | Ivan Kohut |
| 18 | MF | GEO | Giorgi Robakidze |
| 19 | MF | UKR | Mykola Kohut |
| 20 | MF | UKR | Nikita Stepovyi |
| 21 | MF | UKR | Vladyslav Klymenko (vice-captain) |

| No. | Pos. | Nation | Player |
|---|---|---|---|
| 22 | DF | UKR | Serhiy Korniychuk |
| 23 | DF | UKR | Oleksiy Husyev (on loan from Dynamo Kyiv) |
| 24 | DF | GAM | Moses Jarju |
| 27 | FW | UKR | Oleh Pushkarov |
| 30 | MF | GAM | Muhammed Jobe |
| 35 | GK | UKR | Maksym Koval |
| 52 | DF | UKR | Stanislav Yarmola |
| 55 | FW | UKR | Timerlan Hryhorchuk |
| 60 | MF | UKR | Maksym Melnychenko (on loan from Polissya Zhytomyr) |
| 70 | FW | CGO | Jerry Yoka (on loan from Polissya-2 Zhytomyr) |
| 74 | DF | UKR | Maryan Faryna (on loan from Shakhtar Donetsk) |
| 75 | GK | UKR | Maksym Nabyt |
| 77 | FW | UKR | Vladyslav Herych (on loan from Dynamo Kyiv) |
| 99 | MF | NGR | Christian Mba (on loan from FC Kharkiv) |

=== Captaincy history ===
Below is a list of all the official club captains FC Chornomorets Odesa has had since its foundation. (Note: Only the person who has started the most official matches as captain within a specific period is mentioned. Official matches include domestic league/cup, european cups.)

| Period | Name |
|---|---|
| 1991 | (Soviet Union) Viktor Hryshko (Note: Played a total of 31 (domestic league 30/domestic cup 1) matches as captain of the starting lineup.) |
| 1992 | (Ukraine) Viktor Hryshko (Note: Played a total of 11 domestic league/domestic cup matches as captain of the starting lineup.) (Ukraine) Yuriy Shelepnytskyi |
| 2001–2002 | (Ukraine) Vitaliy Kolesnichenko (Note: Played a total of 34 (domestic league/domestic cup) matches as captain of the starting lineup.) |
| 2002–2003 | (Ukraine) Vitaliy Kolesnichenko (Note: Played a total of 11 (domestic league/domestic cup) matches as captain of the starting lineup.) (Moldova) Valeriu Catînsus |
| 2003–2004 | (Moldova) Valeriu Catînsus (Note: Played a total of 19 (domestic league 15/domestic cup 4) matches as captain of the starting lineup.) |
| 2004–2005 | (Ukraine) Viktor Dotsenko (Note: Played a total of 18 domestic league matches as captain of the starting lineup.) |
| 2005–2006 | (Ukraine) Andriy Kirlik (Note: Played a total of 19 domestic league matches as captain of the starting lineup.) |
| 2006–2007 | (Ukraine) Andriy Kirlik (Note: Played a total of 30 domestic league and UEFA Cup matches as captain of the starting lineup.) |
| 2007–2008 | (Ukraine) Vitaliy Rudenko (Note: Played a total of 25 domestic league/domestic cup and Intertoto Cup matches as captain of the starting lineup.) |
| 2008–2009 | (Ukraine) (Russia) Gennady Nizhegorodov (Note: Played a total of 10 domestic league/domestic cup matches as captain of the starting lineup.) |
| 2009–2010 | (Ukraine) Vladyslav Vashchuk |
| 2010–2011 | (Ukraine) Oleksandr Babych |
| 2011–2012 | (Ukraine) Serhiy Politylo |
| 2012–2013 | (Ukraine) Dmytro Bezotosnyi |
| 2013–2014 | (Ukraine) Dmytro Bezotosnyi |
| 2014–2015 | (Ukraine) Anatoliy Didenko |
| 2015–2016 | (Ukraine) Artem Filimonov |
| 2016–2017 | (Ukraine) Artem Filimonov |
| 2017–2018 | (Ukraine) Serhiy Lyulka |
| 2018–2019 | (Ukraine) Serhiy Litovchenko |
| 2019–2020 | (Ukraine) Volodymyr Arzhanov |
| 2020–2021 | (Ukraine) Vladyslav Klymenko |
| 2021–2022 | (Ukraine) Beka Vachiberadze |
| 2022–2023 | (Ukraine) Illya Putrya |
| 2023–2024 | (Ukraine) Illya Putrya |
| 2024–2025 | (Ukraine) Bohdan Butko |
| 2025–2026 | (Ukraine) Yaroslav Rakitskyi (Note: Played a total of 17 (domestic league 16/domestic cup 1) matches as captain of the starting lineup.) |

== Club staff ==
As of 18 August 2026

| Position | Name |
Administration
| President | (Ukraine) Oleksandr Hranovskyi |
| Vice-president | (Ukraine) Dmytro Shapiro |
| General director | (Ukraine) Valeriy Deordiev |
| Executive director | (Ukraine) Andriy Chernov |
| Sporting director | - |
Coaching (first team)
| Head coach | (Ukraine) Roman Hryhorchuk |
| Assistant coach | (Ukraine) Serhiy Politylo (Ukraine) (Russia) Andriy Parkhomenko |
| Goalkeeping coach | (Ukraine) Andriy Hlushchenko |
Coaching (Chornomorets-2 team)
| Head coach | (Ukraine) Valentyn Poltavets (Note: since 21 July 2026) |
| Goalkeeping coach | (Ukraine) Serhiy Kravchenko |

== Managers ==
=== First team ===
- (Soviet Union) Konstantin Shchegotsky (1945–46)
- (Soviet Union) Aleksei Kostylev (1953)
- (Soviet Union) Vsevolod Bobrov (1963)
- (Soviet Union) Vladimir Gorokhov (1964)
- (Soviet Union) Yuriy Voynov (1964–67)
- (Soviet Union) Valentin Fyodorov (1967)
- (Soviet Union) Nikolai Morozov (1967–68)
- (Soviet Union) Sergei Shaposhnikov (1968–70)
- (Soviet Union) Yuriy Voynov (1970)
- (Soviet Union) Viktor Zhylin (1971)
- (Soviet Union) Nikolai Morozov (1971)
- (Soviet Union) Ahmad Alaskarov (1973–77)
- (Soviet Union) Nikita Simonyan (1980–81)
- (Soviet Union) Viktor Prokopenko (1982–86)
- (Soviet Union) Anatoli Polosin (1987–88)
- (Soviet Union) (Ukraine) Viktor Prokopenko (1989–94)
- (Ukraine) Leonid Buryak (1994–98)
- (Ukraine) Oleksandr Holokolosov (1998–99)
- (Ukraine) Anatoliy Azarenkov (1999–01)
- (Ukraine) Oleksandr Skrypnyk (2001–02)
- (Ukraine) Leonid Haidarzhy (2002)
- (Ukraine) Semen Altman (1 January 2003 – 23 June 2007)
- (Russia) Vitaly Shevchenko (27 June 2007 – 3 November 2008)
- (Ukraine) Viktor Hryshko (3 November 2008 – 12 August 2009)
- (Ukraine) Ihor Nakonechnyi (interim) (12 August 2009 – 1 September 2009)
- (Ukraine) Andriy Bal (1 September 2009 – 13 May 2010)
- (Ukraine) Ihor Nakonechnyi (13 May 2010 – 16 November 2010)
- (Ukraine) Roman Hryhorchuk (16 November 2010 – 2014)
- (Ukraine) Oleksandr Babych (2014 – 22 August 2017)
- (Ukraine) Oleksandr Hranovskyi (interim) (22 August 2017 – 30 August 2017)
- (Ukraine) Oleksiy Chystyakov (interim) (30 August 2017 – 4 September 2017)
- (Belarus) Oleg Dulub (4 September 2017 – 22 December 2017)
- (Ukraine) Kostyantyn Frolov (23 December 2017 – 13 June 2018)
- (Bulgaria) Angel Chervenkov (13 June 2018 – 16 September 2019)
- (Ukraine) Vitaliy Starovik (interim) (16 September 2019 – 14 October 2019)
- (Ukraine) Ostap Markevych (14 October 2019 – April 2020)
- (Ukraine) Serhiy Kovalets (13 May 2020 – 18 February 2021)
- (Ukraine) Oleksiy Antonov (18 February 2021 – 22 June 2021)
- (Ukraine) Yuriy Moroz (23 June 2021 – 30 December 2021)
- (Ukraine) Roman Hryhorchuk (30 December 2021 – 30 June 2024)
- (Ukraine) Oleksandr Babych (9 July 2024 – 23 March 2025)
- (Ukraine) Oleksandr Kucher (24 March 2025 – 13 January 2026)
- (Ukraine) Roman Hryhorchuk (14 January 2026 – present)

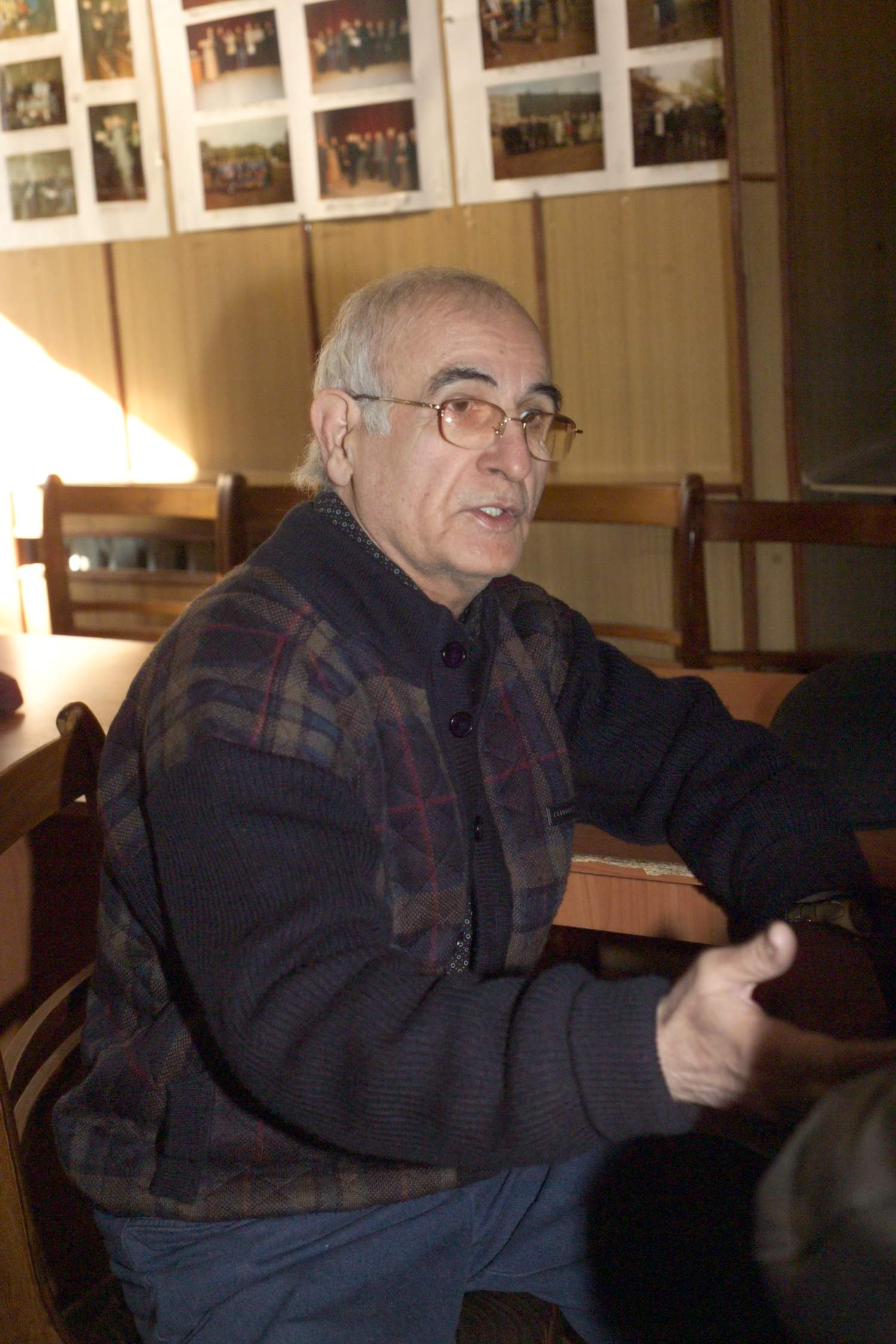
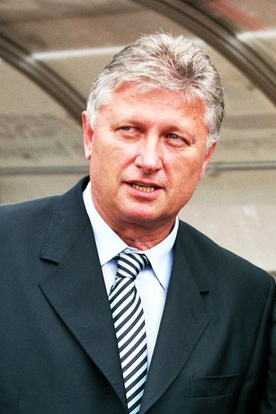
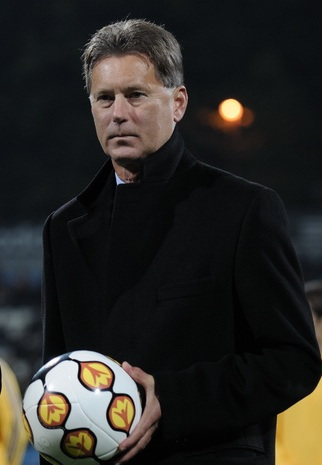
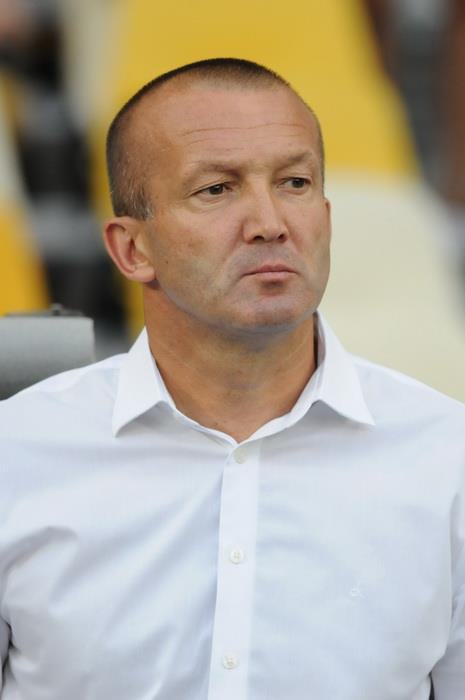
| Akhmed Aleskerov led club to its highest result in the USSR championships (top league) – 3rd place and bronze in the 1974 USSR championship. Viktor Prokopenko won with Sailors the USSR Football Federation Cup (1990), the Ukrainian Cup twice (1992, 1993/94), and bronze in the Ukrainian Premier League twice – 1992/93 and 1993/94. Leonid Buryak twice led Chornomorets to silver in the Ukrainian Premier League, in 1994/95 and 1995/96. Under the leadership of Roman Hryhorchuk, club reached the playoffs of the 2013/14 UEFA Europa League for the first time in its history. |

== Presidents ==
- 1989–1992 Yuriy Zabolotny
- 1992–1995 Vyacheslav Leshchuk
- 1996–1997 Hryhoriy Biberhal
- 1998–1998 Petro Naida
- 1998–2002 Leonid Klimov (honorary president ever since)
- 2002–05/2009 Oleh Marus (Note: Sources (mass media, stats sites) indicate he was the club's vice president.)
- 2022–present Oleksandr Hranovskyi

== See also ==
- FC Chornomorets-2 Odesa
- SK Odesa
- Black Sea Shipping Company
