= FC Torpedo Zaporizhzhia =

Torpedo Zaporizhzhia
- Full name: FC Torpedo Zaporizhzhia
- Nicknames: Automobilists, Automakers
- Founded: 1982
- Dissolved: 2003
- Ground: AutoZAZ Arena
- Capacity: 15,000
- League: Ukrainian Premier League

FC Torpedo Zaporizhzhia is a former professional football team based in Zaporizhzhia, Ukraine.

== History ==
Founded in 1982, the club played in the Ukrainian Premier League from 1992 through 1998, after being initially chosen to participate for being one of the top 9 (of 11) Ukrainian teams from the West Division of the Soviet Second League in 1991. Prior to 1982 there were number of the Torpedo predecessors among which "Komunarivets", "Traktor", "Mashynobudivnyk", and others.

Torpedo Zaporizhzhia's best achievement in the Ukrainian Premier League was 7th place (thrice, in 1992 (prorated), 1994–95, and 1995–96). The club has successfully competing in the domestic cup competition in early years being eliminated only in semi-finals twice in a row and reaching the best of eight the next year. In April 1996 the club's creator (Stepan Kravchun) and the factory general director was removed from governing of the club which had reflected in further club's performance.

Following relegation during the 1997–98 season, Torpedo Zaporizhzhia competed successfully in the Ukrainian First League, taking third place and achieving promotion back to the Ukrainian Premier League. However, despite this finish, the club applied for bankruptcy following the conclusion of the 1998–99 season and were suspended by the Ukrainian Football Association. In early March 2000 in press media appeared information that the club may cease its operations because the Professional Football League of Ukraine received a letter from the club's president Serhiy Kharhenko which informed that the team is withdrawing from the 1999–2000 season due to lack of financing. The club returned to the Ukrainian Second League in 2002 and 2003, but was relegated to the amateur league thereafter.

FC Torpedo Zaporizhzhia played its games at the AutoZAZ Stadium with maximum capacity of 15,000.

In 2002–03 under Torpedo Zaporizhzhia brand played a football team of the Zaporizhzhia Institute of State and Municipal Administration (ZIGMU), formerly FC Viktor Zaporizhzhia. After relegation the team was renamed into ZIGMU-Spartak Zaporizhzhia and continued to play in regional competitions.

Colours are white shirts, blue shorts.

=== Honours ===
- Cup of the Ukrainian SSR (1, amateur): 1984
- Champion of the Ukrainian SSR (1): 1990

== League and cup history ==
Soviet Union

Season	Div.	Pos.	Pl.	W	D	L	GS	GA	P	Domestic Cup	Europe	Notes
1985	3rd	24	40	10	14	16	39	44	34			VI Zone; Group 2 (12 place)
1986	3rd	9	40	17	7	16	49	47	41			VI Zone; Group 2 (6 place)
1987	3rd	20	52	12	16	24	54	81	40			VI Zone
1988	3rd	24	50	13	12	25	55	71	38			VI Zone
1989	3rd	13	52	19	12	21	51	62	50			Relegated; VI Zone
1990	4th	1	36	23	8	5	53	25	54			Promoted; I Zone
1991	3rd	7	42	18	10	14	63	50	46			West Zone

Ukraine

Season	Div.	Pos.	Pl.	W	D	L	GS	GA	P	Domestic Cup	Europe	Notes
1992	1st	4	18	6	7	5	21	26	19	1/2 finals		Group A
1992–93	1st	13	30	9	7	14	32	40	25	1/2 finals		
1993–94	1st	13	34	9	10	15	27	39	28	1/4		
1994–95	1st	7	34	15	3	16	49	49	48	1/8		
1995–96	1st	7	34	15	3	16	40	45	48	1/8		
1996–97	1st	14	30	8	5	17	25	56	29	1/8		
1997–98	1st	16	30	2	7	21	20	69	13	1/8		Relegated
1998–99	2nd	3	38	24	5	9	55	29	77	1/32		Filed a bankruptcy
1999-00	2nd	18	34	5	1	28	21	32	16	1/16		Reinstated after the bankruptcy Relegated and Folded
2001–02	3rd	15	34	7	10	17	22	57	31	1/16^{*}		Reinstated second time
2002–03	3rd	16	30	4	7	19	19	52	19	1/32		Relegated

== See also ==
- FC Metalurh Zaporizhzhia
- FC Silmash Zaporizhzhia
- FC Viktor Zaporizhzhia
