= 1992 FC Kremin Kremenchuk season =

Kremin
1992 season
- Manager: (Ukraine) Volodymyr Lozynskyi
- Stadium: Dnipro
- Vyshcha Liha: 7th
- Ukrainian Cup: Round of 16
- Top goalscorer: League: Ivan Karponay (7); All: Ivan Karponay (8)
- Highest home attendance: 12,000
- Lowest home attendance: 5,500

The 1992 season was FC Kremin Kremenchuk's 1st season in the Ukrainian Premier League.

== Management team ==
=== Coaching staff ===
Position	Name
Head coach	(Ukraine) Volodymyr Lozynskyi
First-team coaches	(Ukraine) Leonid Dyndikov
First-team coaches	(Ukraine) Oleh Bystrytskyi
First-team coaches	(Ukraine) Ihor Martynenko

=== Club personnel ===
Position	Name
Administrator	(Ukraine) Tyberiy Korponay
Nachalnik Komandy	(Ukraine) Petr Skrylnyk
Team Doctor	(Ukraine) Andriy Bahlaienko
Team Doctor	(Ukraine) Yurii Zaslavskyi

== First-team squad ==
Note: Flags indicate national team as defined under FIFA eligibility rules; some limited exceptions apply. Players may hold more than one non-FIFA nationality.

No.	Pos.	Nation	Player
—	GK	(Ukraine) UKR	Valerii Dudka
—	GK	(Ukraine) UKR	Roman Kishpeshta
—	DF	(Ukraine) UKR	Volodymyr Husak
—	DF	(Ukraine) UKR	Oleksandr Isaiev
—	DF	(Ukraine) UKR	Serhiy Lezhentsev
—	DF	(Ukraine) UKR	Oleksandr Poliakov
—	DF	(Ukraine) UKR	Serhiy Shevchenko
—	DF	(Ukraine) UKR	Viacheslav Zhenylenko

No.	Pos.	Nation	Player
—	MF	(Ukraine) UKR	Yaroslav Bobyliak
—	MF	(Ukraine) UKR	Ihor Zhabchenko
—	MF	(Ukraine) UKR	Volodymyr Konovalchuk
—	MF	(Ukraine) UKR	Adalbert Korponay
—	MF	(Ukraine) UKR	Serhiy Laktionov
—	MF	(Ukraine) UKR	Andrii Marchenko
—	MF	(Ukraine) UKR	Volodymyr Hrudyna
—	FW	(Ukraine) UKR	Ivan Korponai
—	FW	(Ukraine) UKR	Volodymyr Malovanets
—	FW	(Ukraine) UKR	Vladyslav Nemeshkalo
—	FW	(Ukraine) UKR	Valerii Sofilkanych

== Pre-season and friendlies ==
Win Draw Loss Fixtures

21 January 1992 Winter Commercial Tournament	Kremin	3–2	Olimpik	Poltava
	Marchenko 58'; Zhabchenko 64'; Boiar 86'		Zaichenko 37'; Pushkutsa 68'	Stadium: Higher Military School of Communications Stadium; Referee: Mykhailychenko

22 January 1992 Winter Commercial Tournament	Kremin	0–2	Metalist	Poltava
			Pryzetko 17'; Nichenko 70'	Stadium: Higher Military School of Communications Stadium; Referee: Hryshko

23 January 1992 Winter Commercial Tournament	Kremin	0–0	Vorskla	Poltava
				Stadium: Higher Military School of Communications Stadium; Referee: Sliusar

== Ukrainian Premier League ==
Kremin's first season in Premier League began on 9 March 1992 and ends on 17 June 1992.

=== League table ===
Pos	Team	Pld	W	D	L	GF	GA	GD	Pts	Qualification or relegation
5	Metalurh Zaporizhzhia	18	6	6	6	20	19	+1	18	
6	Karpaty Lviv	18	5	6	7	15	18	−3	16	
7	Kremin Kremenchuk	18	4	8	6	17	23	−6	16	
8	Nyva Vinnytsia (R)	18	5	4	9	18	33	−15	14	Relegated to Ukrainian First League
9	Evis Mykolaiv (R)	18	3	4	11	12	29	−17	10	Relegated to Ukrainian First League

Updated to match(es) played on unknown. Source:
Rules for classification: 1st points; 2nd wins; 3rd goal difference
(R) Relegated

=== Results summary ===
Overall								Home						Away					
Pld	W	D	L	GF	GA	GD	Pts	W	D	L	GF	GA	GD	W	D	L	GF	GA	GD
18	4	8	6	17	23	−6	16	3	4	2	10	9	+1	1	4	4	7	14	−7

Source: FFU
From 1992-1994 Premier League 2 points awarded for win, this was changed to 3 points starting 1994-95 season

=== Results by round ===
Round	1	2	3	4	5	6	7	8	9	10	11	12	13	14	15	16	17	18	19	20
Ground	H		A	A	H	H	A	A	H	H	A	A	H	H	A	A	H	H		A
Result	W		D	L	D	W	D	D	L	D	L	L	W	D	W	D	D	L		L
Position	2	4	4	6	7	6	6	6	6	6	6	6	6	6	6	6	6	6	6	7

Source: FFU
A = Away; H = Home; W = Win; D = Draw; L = Loss

==== Matches ====
Win Draw Loss Fixtures

7 March 1992 1	Kremin	1–0	Nyva	Kremenchuk
14:00 EET	Korponai 35', (yellow card) 90'	Report	Yaremko (yellow card) 65'	Stadium: Dnipro Stadium; Attendance: 8,000; Referee: Vadym Shevchenko

18 March 1992 3	Torpedo	0–0	Kremin	Zaporizhzhia
16:00 EET		Report	Shevchenko (yellow card) 65'; Malovanets (yellow card) 90'	Stadium: AutoZAZ Stadium; Attendance: 4,000; Referee: Viktor Holovko

21 March 1992 4	Shakhtar	2–0	Kremin	Donetsk
	Bielichenko 14'; Popov (yellow card) 69'; Pohodin 75'	Report	Isaiev (yellow card) 34'; Dudka (yellow card) 74' (yellow-red card) 85'	Stadium: Shakhtar Stadium; Attendance: 1,500; Referee: Vasyl Melnychuk

27 March 1992 5	Kremin	1–1	Temp	Kremenchuk
14:00 EET	Zhabchenko 26'; Kishpeshta (yellow card) 28'	Report	Dovhalets 70'	Stadium: Dnipro Stadium; Attendance: 12,000; Referee: Oleksandr Litvinenko

30 March 1992 6	Kremin	1–0	Karpaty	Kremenchuk
	Korponai 26'	Report	Derkach (yellow card) 82'	Stadium: Dnipro Stadium; Attendance: 9,000; Referee: Oleksandr Tiutiun

4 April 1992 7	Evis	0–0	Kremin	Mykolaiv
16:00 EET		Report	Shevchenko (yellow card) 78'	Stadium: Central City Stadium; Attendance: 4,000; Referee: Valeriy Lysenko

7 April 1992 8	Chornomorets	1–1	Kremin	Odesa
17:00 EET	Husyev 56'	Report	Bobyliak 79'	Stadium: Central Stadium of the Black Sea Shipping Company; Attendance: 3,500; Referee: Oleksandr Litvinenko

16 April 1992 9	Kremin	1–0	Metalurh	Kremenchuk
	Husak (yellow card) 43'	Report	Husak 26' (o.g.); Storchak (yellow card) 43'; Holovan (yellow card) 83'; Shkapenko (yellow card) 87'	Stadium: Dnipro Stadium; Attendance: 9,000; Referee: Yaroslav Hrysio

19 April 1992 10	Kremin	1–1	Tavriya	Kremenchuk
	Korponai 20'	Report	Shevchenko 68'	Stadium: Dnipro Stadium; Attendance: 10,000; Referee: Valeriy Onufer

25 April 1992 11	Metalurh	1–0	Kremin	Zaporizhzhia
15:00 EET	Holovan 30'; Dudnyk (yellow card) 49'; Sorokalet (penalty missed) 60'	Report	Dudka (yellow card) 30'; Shevchenko (yellow card) 52'; Lezhentsev (yellow card) 85'	Stadium: Metalurh Stadium; Attendance: 2,750; Referee: Valeriy Onufer

28 April 1992 12	Tavriya	3–0	Kremin	Simferopol
18:00 EET	Gladyshev 9'; Hudymenko 16'; Shevchenko 42'	Report		Stadium: Lokomotiv Stadium; Attendance: 2,150; Referee: Anatoliy Aranovskyi

7 May 1992 13	Kremin	2–1	Evis	Kremenchuk
	Korponay 16'; Zhabchenko (yellow card) 41'; Korponai 82'	Report	Horiachev 13'; Mashnin (yellow card) 41'	Stadium: Dnipro Stadium; Attendance: 11,000; Referee: Viktor Holovko

10 May 1992 14	Kremin	1–1	Chornomorets	Kremenchuk
	Shevchenko (yellow card) 25'; Korponay 61'	Report	Hetsko (yellow card) 36', (goal) 43' (pen.)	Stadium: Dnipro Stadium; Attendance: 13,000; Referee: Viktor Zvyahintsev

28 April 1992 15	Temp	2–3	Kremin	Shepetivka
18:00 EET	Nedorostkov 33'; Dovhalets 49' (pen.)	Report	Bobyliak 11'; Zhabchenko 43'; Korponai 70'; Marchenko (yellow card) 85'	Stadium: Temp Stadium; Attendance: 7,500; Referee: Viktor Zvyahintsev

21 May 1992 16	Karpaty Lviv	1–1	Kremin	Lviv
	Kozak (penalty missed) 34'; Mokrytskyi 86'	Report	Korponai 52'	Stadium: Ukraina Stadium; Attendance: 7,000; Referee: Anatoliy Aranovskyi

6 June 1992 17	Kremin	1–1	Torpedo	Kremenchuk
	Laktionov 5'	Report	Bondarenko (yellow card) 32'; Sydorkin 37'	Stadium: Dnipro Stadium; Attendance: 7,000; Referee: Vasyl Melnychuk

9 June 1992 18	Kremin Kremenchuk	2–3	Shakhtar Donetsk	Kremenchuk
	Laktionov 9', 48'	Report	Rebrov 7', (penalty missed) 29'; Scherbakov 38'; Fokin 55'	Stadium: Dnipro Stadium; Attendance: 10,000; Referee: Leonid Bavykin

17 June 1992 20	Nyva	4–2	Kremin	Vinnytsia
19:00 EET	Kosovskyi 9' (pen.), 71'; Zubchuk 35'; Shubin 58'	Report	Korponai 10'; Zhabchenko 26'	Stadium: Lokomotyv Stadium; Attendance: 4,800; Referee: Mykhailo Sydor

== Ukrainian Cup ==
=== First preliminary round ===
16 February 1992	Temp	1 - 2	Kremin	Spartak, Shepetivka
	Dovhalets 85'	(Report)	Konovalchuk 2' 20'; Korponai (yellow card) 85'	Attendance: 2,000; Referee: Volodymyr Tukhovskyi (Simferopol)

=== Second preliminary round ===
23 February 1992	Kremin	2 - 0	Polihraftekhnika	Dnipro, Kremenchuk
	Nemeshkalo 80'; Korponai 83'	(Report)	Maksimov (yellow card) 27'	Attendance: 5,000; Referee: Ihor Yarmenchuk (Kyiv)

=== Round of 16 ===
1 March 1992	Naftovyk	1 - 1	Kremin	Avanhard, Yalta
	Lipynskyi 18'; Ermak (yellow card) 50'; Shurshyn (yellow card) 55'	(Report)	Lezhentsev 58' 20'; Konovalchuk (yellow card) 55'	Attendance: 200; Referee: Kostiantyn Panchyk (Simferopol)

14 March 1992	Kremin	0 - 1	Naftovyk	Dnipro, Kremenchuk
		(Report)	Horoh (yellow card) 22'; Hrachov 55'	Attendance: 8,000; Referee: Serhiy Tatulian (Kyiv)

=== Disciplinary record ===
N	Pos.	Nat.	Name	Yellow card	Second yellow card	Red card	Notes
	FW	(Ukraine)	Korponai	1	0	0	
		(Ukraine)	Konovalchuk	1	0	0	

Last updated: March 5
Source: Competitive matches
Only competitive matches
(yellow card) = Number of bookings; (second yellow card) = Number of sending offs after a second yellow card; (red card) = Number of sending offs by a direct red card.
