= 1992–93 Ukrainian Cup =

1992–93 Ukrainian Football Cup
Кубок України з футболу

Tournament details
- Country: Ukraine
- Dates: 26 July 1992 – 30 May 1993
- Teams: 80

Final positions
- Champions: Dynamo Kyiv (1st title)
- Runners-up: Karpaty Lviv

Tournament statistics
- Matches played: 106
- Goals scored: 311 (2.93 per match)
- Top goal scorer: Vitaliy Parakhnevych (8)

The 1992–93 Ukrainian Cup was the second edition of the Ukrainian Cup competition. It started on July 26, 1992, with a Podillya face-off and concluded with the final on May 30, 1993. The main highlights of this season's edition was a successful play of FC Khimik Sieverodonetsk who made to the quarterfinals at expense of FC Shakhtar Donetsk, defeating them at the first stage of the Cup competition. Another sensation was the defeat of the defending champions FC Chornomorets Odesa from their city-mates SC Odesa in the first round of the competition as well. Once again teams FC Torpedo Zaporizhzhia and FC Metalist Kharkiv made to the semifinals.

The top scorer this season was Vitaliy Parakhnevych who was at the biggest fault in eliminating the Cup holders Chornomorets Odesa. FC Kryvbas Kryvyi Rih and FC Hazovyk Komarne were suspended for participation in the next year competition due to no showing up for games. Those teams were awarded a technical loss.

== Team allocation ==
Eighty teams entered the competition.

Transitional League did not participate and Chernihiv and Volyn oblasts did not provide their representatives to the tournament.

=== Distribution ===
	Teams entering in this round	Teams advancing from previous round
1st Qualifying round (64 teams)	24 winners of regional cup competitions (selected); 18 participants of the Second League; 22 participants of the First League	
2nd Qualifying round (32 teams)		32 winners from the first qualifying round
Tournament proper (32 teams)	16 participants of the Higher League	16 winners from the third qualifying round

== Competition schedule ==
=== First preliminary round ===
Almost all games were played on August 1, 1992. The Vinnytsia Oblast face-off between Podillya and Nyva took place on July 26 and Rotor challenged Polihraftekhnika on August 4, 1992.

FC Podillia Kyrnasivka (Am)	1:3	(1L) FC Nyva Vinnytsia
FC Polihraftekhnika-2 Oleksandria (Am)	1:0	(2L) FC Dnipro Cherkasy
FC Tytan Armyansk (2L)	1:2	(2L) FC Chaika Sevastopol	aet
FC Inturist Yalta (Am)	0:1	(1L) FC Temp Shepetivka
FC Lokomotyv Rivne (Am)	1:0	(1L) FC Podillya Khmelnytskyi	aet (in Kovel)
FC Dynamo-3 Kyiv (Am)	2:0	(1L) FC Desna Chernihiv	(SKA Stadium)
FC Ptakhivnyk Velyki Hai (Am)	1:0	(2L) FC Halychyna Drohobych	Velyki Hai is adjacent to Ternopil
FC Hazovyk Komarne (2L)	0:0	(1L) FC Skala Stryi	aet, pk 4:2
FC Khutrovyk Tysmenytsia (Am)	1:1	(1L) FC Prykarpattia Ivano-Frankivsk	aet, pk 1:3
FC Lada Chernivtsi (Am)	1:0	(2L) FC Dnister Zalischyki
FC Sokil-Lorta Lviv (Am)	2:0	(1L) FC Zakarpattia Uzhhorod
FC Metalist Irshava (Am)	3:0	(1L) FC Pryladyst Mukacheve
FC Keramik Baranivka (Am)	2:1	(1L) FC Krystal Chortkiv
FC Paperovyk Poninka (Am)	0:4	(2L) FC Polissya Zhytomyr
FC Zdvyzh Borodianka (Am)	3:1	(2L) FC ZS-Oriana Kyiv
FC Hirnyk Pavlohrad (Am)	0:3	(2L) FC Zirka Kirovohrad
FC Yavir Krasnopillia (2L)	2:0	(1L) FC Avtomobilist Sumy
FC Khimik Sieverodonetsk (1L)	1:0	(1L) FC Stal Alchevsk
FC Dynamo Luhansk (3L)	4:2	(2L) FC Vahanobudivnyk Stakhanov	aet
FC Avanhard Lozova (Am)	0:1	(1L) FC Naftovyk Okhtyrka
FC Spartak Okhtyrka (Am)	0:1	(1L) FC Vorskla Poltava	Trostianets (Sumy Oblast)
FC Naftokhimik Kremenchuk (3L)	1:1	(1L) FC Dynamo-2 Kyiv	aet, pk 2:4
FC Orbita Zaporizhia (Am)	1:2	(1L) FC Ros Bila Tserkva
FC Vuhlyk Bilozerske (Am)	2:3	(1L) FC Shakhtar Pavlohrad	Dobropillia
FC Tavria Novotroitsk (Am)	0:1	(1L) FC Metalurh Nikopol	aet
FC Bazhanovets Makiivka (2L)	2:3	(2L) FC Shakhtar-2 Donetsk
FC Druzhba Osypenko (2L)	2:0	(2L) FC Azovets Mariupol
FC Olimpia Yuzhnoukrainsk (Am)	3:4	(1L) SC Odesa	aet
FC Chornomorets-2 Odesa (2L)	1:4	(1L) FC Artania Ochakiv
FC Blaho Blahoeve (Am)	1:2	(1L) FC Evis Mykolaiv	aet (Ivanivka Raion, Odesa Oblast)
FC Meliorator Kakhovka (2L)	2:0	(2L) FC Krystal Kherson
FC Rotor Cherkasy (Am)	2:3	(1L) FC Polihraftekhnika Oleksandria

=== Second preliminary round ===
Almost all games took place on August 7, 1992. The game between Lokomotyv and junior team of Dynamo in Zdolbuniv was played a week later on August 15, 1992.

FC Polihraftekhnika Oleksandria (1L)	4:0	FC Polihraftekhnika-2 Oleksandria (Am)
FC Chaika Sevastopol (2L)	0:2	(1L) FC Temp Shepetivka
FC Ptakhivnyk Velyki Hai (Am)	1:4	(2L) FC Hazovyk Komarne
FC Prykarpattia Ivano-Frankivsk (1L)	5:1	(Am) FC Lada Chernivtsi
Sokil-LORTA Lviv (Am)	4:1	(Am) FC Metalist Irshava
FC Nyva Vinnytsia (1L)	3:0	(Am) FC Keramik Baranivka	aet
FC Khimik Zhytomyr (2L)	2:0	(Am) FC Zdvyzh Borodianka
FC Zirka Kirovohrad (2L)	0:0	(2L) FC Yavir Krasnopillia	aet, pk 10:11
FC Khimik Sieverodonetsk (1L)	4:3	(3L) FC Dynamo Luhansk	aet
FC Naftovyk Okhtyrka (1L)	3:2	(1L) FC Vorskla Poltava
FC Dynamo-2 Kyiv (1L)	3:2	(1L) FC Ros Bila Tserkva	aet
FC Shakhtar Pavlohrad (1L)	3:1	(1L) FC Metalurh Nikopol
FC Shakhtar-2 Donetsk (2L)	5:0	(2L) FC Druzhba Osypenko	Kostiantynivka
SC Odesa (1L)	3:0	(1L) FC Artania Ochakiv
FC Evis Mykolaiv (1L)	2:0	(1L) FC Meliorator Kakhovka
FC Lokomotyv Rivne (Am)	1:0	(Am) FC Dynamo-3 Kyiv	Zdolbuniv

=== Bracket ===
Round of 32
Polihraftekhnika	1	0	1
Metalist Kharkiv	2	5	7
Temp Shepetivka (a)	2	3	5
Bukovyna Chernivtsi	1	4	5
Lokomotyv Rivne	0	1	1
Nyva Ternopil	0	2	2
Hazovyk Komarne	2	-	-
Dnipro	3	+	+
Sokil-LORTA Lviv	0	0	0
Dynamo Kyiv	7	3	10
Prykarpattia	x	x	+
Kryvbas Kryvyi Rih	x	x	-
Khimik Zhytomyr	1	1	2
Volyn Lutsk	1	3	4
Nyva Vinnytsia	2	0	2
Zorya-MALS	1	2	3
Naftovyk Okhtyrka	1	0	1
Torpedo Zaporizhzhia	0	2	2
Dynamo-2 Kyiv	2	1	3
Veres Rivne (a)	2	1	3
Khimik Sieverodonetsk	4	1	5
Shakhtar Donetsk	3	1	4
Yavir Krasnopilya	0	1	1
Kremin Kremenchuk	3	2	5
Shakhtar-2 Donetsk	0	2	2
Metalurh Zaporizhya	0	5	5
Shakhtar Pavlohrad	1	0	1
Tavriya Simferopol	1	3	4
Odesa (a)	0	3	3
Chornomorets Odesa	1	2	3
Evis Mykolaiv	1	0	1
Karpaty Lviv	0	3	3

Round of 16
Metalist Kharkiv	1	0	1
Temp Shepetivka	0	0	0
Nyva Ternopil	3	0	3
Dnipro	0	2	2
Prykarpattia	0	1	1
Dynamo Kyiv	2	4	6
Zorya-MALS	3	0	3
Volyn Lutsk	0	5	5
Torpedo Zaporizhzhia	3	1	4
Veres Rivne	1	2	3
Kremin Kremenchuk	2	0	2
Khimik Sieverodonetsk (a)	1	1	2
Tavriya Simferopol	1	0	1
Metalurh Zaporizhya	1	3	4
Odesa	0	2	2
Karpaty Lviv	0	3	3

Quarter-finals
Metalist Kharkiv (a)	1	1	2
Nyva Ternopil	0	2	2
Dynamo Kyiv	5	2	7
Volyn Lutsk	1	2	3
Khimik Sieverodonetsk	0	0	0
Torpedo Zaporizhzhia	0	1	1
Metalurh Zaporizhya	0	1	1
Karpaty Lviv	1	2	3

Semi-finals
Metalist Kharkiv	1	0	1
Dynamo Kyiv	1	3	4
Torpedo Zaporizhzhia	0	1	1
Karpaty Lviv	1	2	3

Final
Dynamo Kyiv	2
Karpaty Lviv	1

=== First round (1/16) ===
Team 1	Agg.	Team 2	1st leg	2nd leg
FC Polihraftekhnika Oleksandriya	1–7	FC Metalist Kharkiv	1–2	0–5
FC Prykarpattia Ivano-Frankivsk	w/o	FC Kryvbas Kryvyi Rih	+:–	
FC Lokomotyv Rivne	1–2	FC Nyva Ternopil	0–0	1–2
FC Khimik Zhytomyr	2–4	FC Volyn Lutsk	1–1	1–3
FC Yavir Krasnopillia	1–5	FC Kremin Kremenchuk	0–3	1–2
FC Khimik Sieverodonetsk	5–4	FC Shakhtar Donetsk	4–3	1–1
FC Naftovyk Okhtyrka	1–2	FC Torpedo Zaporizhzhia	1–0	0–2
FC Dynamo-2 Kyiv	3–3 (a)	FC Veres Rivne	2–2	1–1
FC Shakhtar-2 Donetsk	2–5	FC Metalurh Zaporizhya	0–0	2–5
FC Evis Mykolaiv	1–3	FC Karpaty Lviv	1–0	0–3
FC Temp Shepetivka	(a) 5–5	FC Bukovyna Chernivtsi	2–1	3–4
FC Hazovyk Komarno	w/o	FC Dnipro Dnipropetrovsk	2–3	–:+
FC Sokil-LORTA Lviv	0–10	FC Dynamo Kyiv	0–7	0–3
FC Nyva Vinnytsia	2–3	FC Zorya-MALS Luhansk	2–1	0–2
FC Shakhtar Pavlohrad	1–4	SC Tavriya Simferopol	1–1	0–3
SC Odesa	(a) 3–3	FC Chornomorets Odesa	0–1	3–2

==== First leg ====
2 September 1992
?:?

Poliharftekhnika Oleksandriya (1L)	1–2	(PL) Metalist Kharkiv
Shevchenko 53'	Report	Kolesnyk 15'; Pryzetko 90'

Olimp Stadium, Oleksandriya
Attendance: 5,000
Referee: Viktor Holovko (Dnipropetrovsk)

2 September 1992
?:?

Prykarpattia Ivano-Frankivsk (1L)	+ : –	(PL) Kryvbas Kryvyi Rih
	[ Report]

Elektron Stadium, Ivano-Frankivsk
Attendance: N/A

Prykarpattia won on walkover.

2 September 1992
?:?

Lokomotyv Rivne (AM)	0–0	(PL) Nyva Ternopil
	Report

Lokomotyv Stadium, Zdolbuniv
Attendance: 800
Referee: Roman Zan (Lviv)

2 September 1992
?:?

Khimik Zhytomyr (2L)	1–1	(PL) Volyn Lutsk
Lukashenko 82'	Report	Sartakov 8'

Khimik Stadium, Zhytomyr
Attendance: 5,000
Referee: Oleksandr Tiutiun (Fastiv)

2 September 1992
?:?

Yavir Krasnopillia (2L)	0–3	(PL) Kremin Kremenchuk
	Report	Laktionov 26'; Bobyliak 74'; Konovalchuk 87'

Kolos Stadium, Krasnopillia
Attendance: 1,000
Referee: Serhiy Shebek (Kyiv)

2 September 1992
?:?

Khimik Sieverodonetsk (1L)	4–3	(PL) Shakhtar Donetsk
Babenko 8'; Mayorov 10'; Bublik 38'; Palamarchuk 55'	Report	Stolovytsky 28'; Atelkin 53'; Popov 75'

Khimik Stadium, Sievierodonetsk
Attendance: 3,000
Referee: Leonid Bavykin (Kharkiv)

2 September 1992
?:?

Naftovyk Okhtyrka (1L)	1–0	(PL) Torpedo Zaporizhzhia
Hrachov 44'	Report

Naftovyk Stadium, Okhtyrka
Attendance: 3,000
Referee: Ihor Yaremchuk (Kyiv)

2 September 1992
?:?

Dynamo-2 Kyiv (1L)	2–2	(PL) Veres Rivne
Bielkin 35'; Taran 60'	Report	Sniehiriov 39'; Svystunov 51'

Lobanovsky Dynamo Stadium, Kyiv
Attendance: 300
Referee: Mykhailo Ovchar (Kalush)

2 September 1992
?:?

Shakhtar-2 Donetsk (2L)	0–0	(PL) "Metalurh"(Zaporizhzhia)
	Report

IA Avtosteklo Stadium, Kostiantynivka
Attendance: 2,500
Referee: Vasyl Melnychuk (Simferopol)

2 September 1992
?:?

Evis Mykolaiv (1L)	1–0	(PL) Karpaty Lviv
Dziuba 86'	Report

Municipal Central Stadium, Mykolaiv
Attendance: 6,000
Referee: Volodymyr Pyanykh (Donetsk)

7 October 1992
?:?

Temp Shepetivka (1L)	2–1	(PL) Bukovyna Chernivtsi
Kulakovsky 43'; Zarutsky 72'	Report	Iriychuk 55'

Temp Stadium, Shepetivka
Attendance: 6,000
Referee: Vadym Shevchenko (Kyiv)

7 October 1992
?:?

Hazovyk Komarne (2L)	2–3	(PL) Dnipro Dnipropetrovsk
Pshtyr 15' (pen.); Shynkariov 88'	Report	Palianytsia 10'; Moroz 73'; Mykhailenko 80'

Hazovyk Stadium, Komarne
Attendance: 7,000
Referee: Anatoliy Aranovsky (Kyiv)

7 October 1992
?:?

Sokil-LORTA Lviv (AM)	0–7	(PL) Dynamo Kyiv
	Report	Hrytsyna 16', 60'; Aleksanenkov 38'; Mintenko 65', 75'; Zuyenko 78'; Volotek 86'

Sokil Stadium, Lviv
Attendance: 7,000
Referee: Valeriy Avdysh (Simferopol)

7 October 1992
?:?

Nyva Vinnytsia (1L)	2–1	(PL) Zoria-MALS Luhansk
Akbarov 40'; Okhrimchuk 67'	Report	Litvinov 64'

Lokomotyv Stadium, Vinnytsia
Attendance: 6,000
Referee: Valeriy Onufer (Uzhhorod)

7 October 1992
?:?

Shakhtar Pavlohrad (1L)	1–1	(PL) Tavriya Simferopol
Sharippo 72'	Report	Sheykhametov 78'

Shakhtar Stadium, Pavlohrad
Attendance: 300
Referee: Viktor Derdo (Illichivsk)

7 October 1992
18:00

Odesa (1L)	0–1	(PL) Chornomorets Odesa
	Report	Yablonskyi 52'

SKA Stadium, Odesa
Attendance: 5,000
Referee: Kostiantyn Panchyk (Simferopol)

==== Second leg ====
7 October 1992
?:?

Metalist Kharkiv (PL)	5–0	(1L) Polihraftekhnika Oleksandriya
Kolesnyk 37'; Pryzetko 59'; Kandaurov 61' (pen.); Borovyk 66'; Karabuta 75'	Report

Metalist Stadium, Kharkiv
Attendance: 1,000
Referee: Oleksandr Hordiyenko (Dnipropetrovsk)

Metalist won 7–1 on aggregate.

7 October 1992
?:?

Nyva Ternopil (PL)	2–1	(AM) Lokomotyv Rivne
Babiy 37'; Biskup 75'	Report	Parshykov 17'

Municipal Central Stadium, Ternopil
Attendance: 5,000
Referee: Mykhailo Ovchar (Kalush)

Nyva won 2–1 on aggregate.

7 October 1992
?:?

Volyn Lutsk (PL)	3–1	(2L) Khimik Zhytomyr
Dykyi 14' (pen.); Sarnavsky 49'; Krukovets 71'	Report	Lukashenko 90'

Avanhard Stadium, Lutsk
Attendance: 1,400
Referee: Valeriy Lysenko (Odesa)

Volyn won 4–2 on aggregate.

7 October 1992
?:?

Kremin Kremenchuk (PL)	2–1	(2L) Yavir Krasnopillia
Zhabchenko 25' (pen.); Laktionov 50'	Report	Samoliuk 8'

Dnipro Stadium, Kremenchuk
Attendance: 5,000
Referee: Valeriy Stoyan (Alchevsk)

Kremin won 5–1 on aggregate.

7 October 1992
?:?

Shakhtar Donetsk (PL)	1–1	(1L) Khimik Sieverodonetsk
Drahunov 43' (pen.)	Report	Marchenko 74'

Shakhtar Stadium, Donetsk
Attendance: 800
Referee: Serhiy Tatulian (Kyiv)

Khimik won 5–4 on aggregate.

7 October 1992
?:?

Torpedo Zaporizhzhia (PL)	2–0	(1L) Naftovyk Okhtyrka
Bondarenko 40'; Mareyev 72'	Report

AvtoZAZ Stadium, Zaporizhzhia
Attendance: 2,000
Referee: Oleh Chorny (Donetsk)

Torpedo won 2–1 on aggregate.

7 October 1992
?:?

Veres Rivne (PL)	1–1	(1L) Dynamo-2 Kyiv
Svystunov 36'	Report	Parshyn 50'

Avanhard Stadium, Rivne
Attendance: 1,800
Referee: Yaroslav Hrysio (Lviv)

Veres won 3–3 on away goal rule.

7 October 1992
?:?

Metalurh Zaporizhya (PL)	5–2	(2L) Shakhtar-2 Donetsk
Holovan 6', 43', 54'; Mushchinka 17'; Antiukhin 89'	Report	Zhygulin 53'; Zavhorodniy 74'

Metalurh Stadium, Zaporizhzhia
Attendance: 3,000
Referee: Yaroslav Lemekh (Lviv)

Metalurh won 5–2 on aggregate.

7 October 1992
?:?

Karpaty Lviv (PL)	3–0	(1L) Evis Mykolaiv
Riznyk 38'; Plotko 57', 69'	Report

Ukraina Stadium, Lviv
Attendance: 4,000
Referee: Volodymyr Tukhovsky (Simferopol)

Karpaty won 3–1 on aggregate.

21 October 1992
?:?

Dnipro Dnipropetrovsk (PL)	+ : –	(2L) Hazovyk Komarne
	[ Report]

Meteor Stadium, Dnipropetrovsk
Attendance: N/A

Dnipro won on walkover.

21 October 1992
?:?

Bukovyna Chernivtsi (PL)	4–3	(1L) Temp Shepetivka
Haydamaschuk 28'; Bidulko 51'; Lutsiv 55'; Finkel 85'	Report	Koliada 49' (pen.), 57', 88' (pen.)

Kolos Stadium, Novoselytsia
Attendance: 1,500
Referee: Valeriy Stoyan (Alchevsk)

Temp won 5–5 on away goal rule.

21 October 1992
?:?

Zoria-MALS Luhansk (PL)	2–0	(1L) Nyva Vinnytsia
Sevidov 56', 69'	Report

Avanhard Stadium, Luhansk
Attendance: 5,000
Referee: Volodymyr Pyanykh (Donetsk)

Zoria won 3–2 on aggregate.

21 October 1992
?:?

Tavriya Simferopol (PL)	3–0	(1L) Shakhtar Pavlohrad
Shevchenko 14' (pen.), 75' (pen.); Haydash 47'	Report

Lokomotyv Stadium, Simferopol
Attendance: 7,500
Referee: Roman Zan (Lviv)

Tavria won 4–1 on aggregate.

21 October 1992
?:?

Chornomorets Odesa (PL)	2–3	(1L) Odesa
Kosheliuk 45'; Husyev 74'	Report	Tymchenko 41'; Parakhnevych 77', 90'

Chornomorets Stadium, Odesa
Attendance: 450
Referee: Stepan Selmensky (Uzhhorod)

Odesa won 3–3 on away goal rule.

11 November 1992
?:?

Dynamo Kyiv (PL)	3–0	(AM) Sokil-LORTA Lviv
Hrytsyna 16' (pen.); Mintenko 61'; Mizin 78'	Report

Lobanovsky Dynamo Stadium, Kyiv
Attendance: 1,000
Referee: Kostiantyn Panchyk (Simferopol)

Dynamo won 10–0 on aggregate.

=== Second round (1/8) ===
Team 1	Agg.	Team 2	1st leg	2nd leg
SC Odesa	2–3	FC Karpaty Lviv	0–0	2–3
FC Metalist Kharkiv	1–0	FC Temp Shepetivka	1–0	0–0
FC Nyva Ternopil	3–2	FC Dnipro Dnipropetrovsk	3–0	0–2
FC Prykarpattia Ivano-Frankivsk	1–6	FC Dynamo Kyiv	0–2	1–4
FC Zorya-MALS Luhansk	3–5	FC Volyn Lutsk	3–0	0–5
FC Kremin Kremenchuk	2–2 (a)	FC Khimik Sieverodonetsk	2–1	0–1
FC Torpedo Zaporizhzhia	4–3	FC Veres Rivne	3–1	1–2
SC Tavriya Simferopol	1–4	FC Metalurh Zaporizhya	1–1	0–3

==== First leg ====
25 November 1992
15:00

Odesa (1L)	0–0	(PL) Karpaty Lviv
	Report

SKA Stadium, Odesa
Attendance: 500
Referee: Anatoliy Aranovsky (Kyiv)

25 November 1992
?:?

Metalist Kharkiv (PL)	1–0	(1L) Temp Shepetivka
Pryzetko 67'	Report

Metalist Stadium, Kharkiv
Attendance: 1,000
Referee: Vasyl Melnychuk (Simferopol)

25 November 1992
?:?

Nyva Ternopil (PL)	3–0	(PL) Dnipro Dnipropetrovsk
Zadvorny 28'; Vasylytchuk 30'; Kulish 58'	Report	Yudin (yellow card) 57' (yellow-red card) 68'; Moskvin (red card) 77'

Municipal Central Stadium, Ternopil
Attendance: 2,500
Referee: Valeriy Onufer (Uzhhorod)

25 November 1992
?:?

Prykarpattia Ivano-Frankivsk (1L)	0–2	(PL) Dynamo Kyiv
	Report	Leonenko 44', 80'

Elektron Stadium, Ivano-Frankivsk
Attendance: 9,000
Referee: Volodymyr Pyanykh (Donetsk)

25 November 1992
?:?

Zoria-MALS Luhansk (PL)	3–0	(PL) Volyn Lutsk
Sevidov 43'; Huseinov 52'; Mazur 71'	Report	Polischuk (red card) 41'

Avanhard Stadium, Luhansk
Attendance: 1,000
Referee: Roman Zan (Lviv)

25 November 1992
?:?

Kremin Kremenchuk (PL)	2–1	(1L) Khimik Sieverodonetsk
Lukash 54' (pen.); Marchenko 64'	Report	Bublik 77'

Dnipro Stadium, Kremenchuk
Attendance: 6,000
Referee: Ihor Yaremchuk (Kyiv)

25 November 1992
?:?

Torpedo Zaporizhzhia (PL)	3–1	(PL) Veres Rivne
R.Bondarenko 10', 80'; O.Bondarenko 38' (pen.)	Report	Hurynovych 73'

AvtoZAZ Stadium, Zaporizhzhia
Attendance: 500
Referee: Leonid Bavykin (Kharkiv)

25 November 1992
?:?

Tavriya Simferopol (PL)	1–1	(PL) "Metalurh"(Zaporizhzhia)
Haydash 78'	Report	Mushchinka 62'

Lokomotyv Stadium, Simferopol
Attendance: 650
Referee: Serhiy Tatulian (Kyiv)

==== Second leg ====
29 November 1992
?:?

Karpaty Lviv (PL)	3–2	(1L) Odesa
Pokladok 11', 79'; Topchiyev 18'	Report	Zayarny 30'; Parakhnevych 37'

Ukraina Stadium, Lviv
Attendance: 4,000
Referee: Viktor Holovko (Dnipropetrovsk)

Karpaty won 3–2 on aggregate.

29 November 1992
?:?

Temp Shepetivka (1L)	0–0	(PL) Metalist Kharkiv
	Report

Temp Stadium, Shepetivka
Attendance: 6,500
Referee: Mykhailo Sydor (Lviv)

Metalist won 1–o on aggregate.

29 November 1992
?:?

Dnipro Dnipropetrovsk (PL)	2–0	(PL) Nyva Ternopil
Dumenko 56', 63'	Report	Kulish (penalty missed) 16'

Meteor Stadium, Dnipropetrovsk
Attendance: 2,500
Referee: Leonid Bavykin (Kharkiv)

Nyva won 3–2 on aggregate.

29 November 1992
?:?

Dynamo Kyiv (PL)	4–1	(1L) Prykarpattia Ivano-Frankivsk
Leonenko 17', 44'; Shkapenko 37'; Zuyenko 87'	Report	Lakhmay 29'; Rusanovsky (red card) 84'

Republican Stadium, Kyiv
Attendance: 2,500
Referee: Valeriy Avdysh (Simferopol)

Dynamo won 6–1 on aggregate.

29 November 1992
?:?

Volyn Lutsk (PL)	5–0	(PL) Zoria-MALS Luhansk
Zub 4' (pen.), 6'; Polny 19'; Dykyi 51'; Bohunov 86'	Report

Avanhard Stadium, Lutsk
Attendance: 1,500
Referee: Stepan Selmensky (Uzhhorod)

Volyn won 5–3 on aggregate.

29 November 1992
?:?

Khimik Sieverodonetsk (1L)	1–0	(PL) Kremin Kremenchuk
Bublik 5'	Report

Khimik Stadium, Sievierodonetsk
Attendance: 3,000
Referee: Vadym Shevchenko (Kyiv)

Khimik won 2–2 on away goal rule.

29 November 1992
?:?

Veres Rivne (PL)	2–1	(PL) Torpedo Zaporizhzhia
Sniehiriov 2'; Kucher 18'	Report	Bondarenko 40'

Avanhard Stadium, Rivne
Attendance: 5,000
Referee: Valeriy Stoyan (Alchevsk)

Torpedo won 4–3 on aggregate.

29 November 1992
?:?

Metalurh Zaporizhya (PL)	3–0	(PL) Tavriya Simferopol
Mushchinka 12' (pen.); Huralsky 31'; Dudnik 87'	Report

Metalurh Stadium, Zaporizhzhia
Attendance: 1,200
Referee: Ihor Bezuhly (Lutsk)

Metalurh won 4–1 on aggregate.

=== Quarterfinals ===
Team 1	Agg.	Team 2	1st leg	2nd leg
FC Khimik Sieverodonetsk	0–1	FC Torpedo Zaporizhzhia	0–0	0–1
FC Metalurh Zaporizhya	1–3	FC Karpaty Lviv	0–1	1–2
FC Dynamo Kyiv	7–3	FC Volyn Lutsk	5–1	2–2
FC Metalist Kharkiv	(a) 2–2	FC Nyva Ternopil	1–0	1–2

==== First leg ====
23 March 1993
?:?

"Khimik" (Sieverodonetsk) (1L)	0–0	(PL) "Torpedo" (Zaporizhzhia)
	Report

Khimik Stadium, Sievierodonetsk
Attendance: 8,000
Referee: Ihor Yaremchuk (Kyiv)

24 March 1993
?:?

"Metalurh" (Zaporizhzhia) (PL)	0–1	(PL) "Karpaty" (Lviv)
	Report	Mokrytsky 73' (pen.)

Metalurh Stadium, Zaporizhzhia
Attendance: 6,000
Referee: Volodymyr Tukhovsky (Simferopol)

24 March 1993
?:?

"Dynamo"(Kyiv) (PL)	5–1	(PL) "Volyn"(Lutsk)
Rebrov 17'; Mizin 31', 33', 62'; Shkapenko 89'	Report	Korotayev 57'

Republican Stadium, Kyiv
Attendance: 4,000
Referee: Volodymyr Pyanykh (Donetsk)

24 March 1993
?:?

"Metalist"(Kharkiv) (PL)	1–0	(PL) "Nyva"(Ternopil)
Pryzetko 72'	Report

Metalist Stadium, Kharkiv
Attendance: 4,000
Referee: Roman Zan (Lviv)

==== Second leg ====
7 April 1993
?:?

"Karpaty"(Lviv) (PL)	2–1	(PL) "Metalurh"(Zaporizhzhia)
Kardash 4'; Mokrytsky (penalty missed) 70'; Pokladok 76'	Report	Varaksin 53'

Ukraina Stadium, Lviv
Attendance: 12,000
Referee: Valeriy Avdysh (Simferopol)

Karpaty won 3–1 on aggregate.

7 April 1993
?:?

"Volyn"(Lutsk) (PL)	2–2	(PL) "Dynamo"(Kyiv)
Pylypenko 65', 86'	Report	Shkapenko 11', 76'

Avanhard Stadium, Lutsk
Attendance: 11,500
Referee: Roman Zan (Lviv)

Dynamo won 7–3 on aggregate.

7 April 1993
?:?

"Nyva"(Ternopil) (PL)	2–1	(PL) "Metalist"(Kharkiv)
Lobas 50'; Mochuliak 78'	Report	Prudius 30'

Central Stadium, Ternopil
Attendance: 18,000
Referee: Viktor Zviahitsev (Donetsk)

Metalist won 2–2 on away goal rule.

10 April 1993
?:?

"Torpedo"(Zaporizhzhia) (PL)	1–0	(1L) "Khimik"(Sievierodonetsk)
Raliuchenko 81' (pen.)	Report

AvtoZAZ Stadium, Zaporizhzhia
Attendance: 6,000
Referee: Kostiantyn Panchyk (Simferopol)

Torpedo won 1–0 on aggregate.

=== Semifinals ===
Team 1	Agg.	Team 2	1st leg	2nd leg
FC Torpedo Zaporizhzhia	1–3	FC Karpaty Lviv	0–1	1–2
FC Metalist Kharkiv	1–4	FC Dynamo Kyiv	1–1	0–3

==== First leg ====
20 April 1993
?:?

"Torpedo" (Zaporizhzhia) (PL)	0–1	(PL) "Karpaty" (Lviv)
	Report	Husyn 31'

AvtoZAZ Stadium, Zaporizhzhia
Attendance: 2,500
Referee: Volodymyr Pyanykh (Donetsk)

20 April 1993
?:?

"Metalist" (Kharkiv) (PL)	1–1	(PL) "Dynamo" (Kyiv)
Kandaurov 62'	Report	Luzhnyi 27'; Rebrov (penalty missed) 67'

Metalist Stadium, Kharkiv
Attendance: 12,000
Referee: Volodymyr Tukhovsky (Simferopol)

==== Second leg ====
11 May 1993
?:?

"Karpaty" (Lviv) (PL)	2–1	(PL) "Torpedo" (Zaporizhzhia)
Plotko 38' (pen.); Kardash 85'	Report	Bondarenko 41'

Ukraina Stadium, Lviv
Attendance: 12,000
Referee: Valeriy Onufer (Uzhhorod)

Karpaty won 3–1 on aggregate.

11 May 1993
?:?

"Dynamo" (Kyiv) (PL)	3–0	(PL) "Metalist" (Kharkiv)
Rebrov 18'; Kovalets (penalty missed) 33'; Serhiy Mizin 56' (pen.); Topchiyev 64'	Report

Republican Stadium, Kyiv
Attendance: 8,000
Referee: Yevhen Kanana (Donetsk)

Dynamo won 4–1 on aggregate.

=== Final ===
30 May 1993
?:?

Dynamo Kyiv (PL)	2–1	(PL) Karpaty Lviv
Leonenko 23'; Topchiyev 64'	Report	Plotko 89' (pen.)

Republican Stadium, Kyiv
Attendance: 47,000
Referee: Volodymyr Pyanykh (Donetsk)

Ukrainian Cup 1992–93 Winners

FC Dynamo Kyiv
First title

== Top goalscorers ==
Scorer	Goals	Team
(Ukraine) Vitaliy Parakhnevych	8	Odesa
(Ukraine) Viktor Leonenko	5	Dynamo Kyiv
(Ukraine) Roman Bondarenko	5	Torpedo Zaporizhzhia
(Ukraine) Serhiy Mizin	5 (1)	Dynamo-2 Kyiv; Dynamo Kyiv
(Ukraine) Oleksandr Pryzetko	4	Metalist Kharkiv
(Ukraine) Pavlo Shkapenko	4	Dynamo Kyiv
(Ukraine) Ihor Shynkaryov	4	Hazovyk Komarno
(Ukraine) Ihor Plotko	4 (2)	Karpaty Lviv

.

== Attendances ==
=== Top attendances ===
Rank	Round	Home team	Away team	Result	Location	Attendance
1	Final	Dynamo Kyiv	Karpaty Lviv	2–1	Republican Stadium, Kyiv	47,000
2	Quarterfinals	Nyva Ternopil	Metalist Kharkiv	2–1	City Stadium, Ternopil	18,000
3	Quarterfinals	Karpaty Lviv	Metalurh Zaporizhya	2–1	Ukraina Stadium, Lviv	12,000
3	Semifinals	Karpaty Lviv	Torpedo Zaporizhzhia	2–1	Ukraina Stadium, Lviv	12,000
3	Semifinals	Metalist Kharkiv	Dynamo Kyiv	1–1	Metalist Stadium, Kharkiv	12,000

== Number of teams by region ==
Number	Region	Team(s)
5	Dnipropetrovsk Oblast	Dnipro Dnipropetrovsk, Metalurh Nikopol, Shakhtar Pavlohrad, Hirnyk Pavlohrad and Kryvbas Kryvyi Rih
5	Donetsk Oblast	Shakhtar Donetsk, Shakhtar-2 Donetsk, Azovets Mariupol, Vuhlyk Bilozerske and Bazhanovets Makiivka
5	Lviv Oblast	Karpaty Lviv, Hazovyk Komarne, Halychyna Drohobych, Sokil Lviv and Skala Stryi
4	Crimea	Tavriya Simferopol, Tytan Armyansk, Inturist Yalta and Chaika Sevastopol
4	Kyiv	Dynamo, CSK ZSU, Dynamo-3 and Dynamo-2
4	Luhansk Oblast	Zorya-MALS Luhansk, Stal Alchevsk, Vahonobudivnyk Stakhanov and Khimik Severodonetsk
4	Sumy Oblast	Naftovyk Okhtyrka, Yavir Krasnopillia, Spartak Okhtyrka and Avtomobilist Sumy
4	Ternopil Oblast	Nyva Ternopil, Dnister Zalishchyky, Ptakhivnyk Velyki Hayi and Krystal Chortkiv
4	Zaporizhia Oblast	Metalurh Zaporizhia, Druzhba Berdiansk, Orbita Zaporizhia and Torpedo Zaporizhia
3	Kherson Oblast	Krystal Kherson, Tavriya Novotroitske and Meliorator Kakhovka
3	Khmelnytskyi Oblast	Temp Shepetivka, Paperovyk Poninka and Nord-Am-Podillya Khmelnytskyi
3	Kirovohrad Oblast	Polihraftekhnika Oleksandriya, Polihraftekhnika-2 Oleksandriya and Zirka Kirovohrad
3	Mykolaiv Oblast	Evis Mykolaiv, Olimpiya Yuzhnoukrainsk and Artania Ochakiv
3	Odesa Oblast	Chornomorets Odesa, Chornomorets-2 Odesa, Blaho Blahoyeve and SC Odesa
3	Zakarpattia Oblast	Zakarpattia Uzhhorod, Metalist Irshava and Karpaty Mukachevo
2	Cherkasy Oblast	Dnipro Cherkasy and Rotor Cherkasy
2	Chernivtsi Oblast	Bukovyna Chernivtsi and Lada Chernivtsi
2	Ivano-Frankivsk Oblast	Prykarpattia Ivano-Frankivsk and Khutrovyk Tysmenytsia
2	Kharkiv Oblast	Metalist Kharkiv and Avanhard Lozova
2	Kyiv Oblast	Ros Bila Tserkva and Zdvyzh Borodyanka
2	Poltava Oblast	Kremin Kremenchuk and Vorskla Poltava
2	Rivne Oblast	Veres Rivne and Lokomotyv Rivne
2	Vinnytsia Oblast	Nyva and Podillia Kyrnasivka
2	Zhytomyr Oblast	Khimik Zhytomyr and Keramik Baranivka
1	Chernihiv Oblast	Desna Chernihiv
1	Volyn Oblast	Volyn Lutsk

== See also ==
- 1992–93 Ukrainian Premier League
- 1992–93 Ukrainian First League
