= 1992 FC Shakhtar Donetsk season =

Shakhtar Donetsk
1992 season
- President: Akhat Bragin
- Manager: Valeriy Yaremchenko
- Stadium: Shakhtar Stadium
- Vyshcha Liha: 4th place
- Ukrainian Cup: Semifinals (1/2)
- Soviet Cup: Round of 16 (1/8)

The 1992 season was the first season in the top Ukrainian football league for Shakhtar Donetsk. Shakhtar Donetsk competed in Vyshcha Liha and Ukrainian Cup, earlier Shakhtar was eliminated from the 1991–92 Soviet Cup.

== Players ==
=== Squad information ===
Squad no.	Name	Nationality	Position	Date of birth (age)	Signed from	Signed in	Apps.	Goals
Goalkeepers
	Dmytro Shutkov	(Ukraine)	GK	3 April 1972 (aged 20)	Academy	1991	28	0
	Andriy Kurayev	(Ukraine)	GK	19 December 1972 (aged 19)	Antratsyt Kirovske	1992	1	0
Defenders
	**Yevhen Drahunov** (c)	(Ukraine)	DF	13 February 1964 (aged 28)	Kolos Pavlohrad	1985	195	15
	Vadym Krasnikov	(Ukraine)	DF	21 January 1969 (aged 23)	Antratsyt Kirovske	1991	3	0
	Andriy Kuptsov	(Ukraine)	DF	23 January 1971 (aged 21)	Kryvbas Kryvyi Rih	1989	0	0
	Oleksandr Martiuk	(Ukraine)	DF	24 July 1972 (aged 19)	Novator Mariupol	1991	21	0
	Vasyl Mazur	(Ukraine)	DF	23 May 1970 (aged 22)	Sports College Luhansk	1987	33	0
	Viktor Smihunov	(Ukraine)	DF	28 January 1962 (aged 30)	Tavriya Simferopol	1992	27	0
Midfielders
	Oleksandr Barabash	(Ukraine)	MF	18 January 1971 (aged 21)	Neftianik Fergana	1992	15	0
	Yuriy Bielichenko	(Ukraine)	MF	13 December 1964 (aged 27)	Nyva Vinnytsia	1992	24	3
	Yevhen Manko	(Ukraine)	MF	14 October 1971 (aged 20)	Stal Komunarsk	1992	4	1
	Serhiy Popov	(Ukraine)	MF	22 April 1971 (aged 21)	Nyva Vinnytsia	1992	17	2
	Ihor Stolovytskyi	(Ukraine)	MF	29 August 1969 (aged 22)	Spartak Ryazan	1990	60	6
	Yuriy Fokin	(Ukraine)	MF	3 January 1966 (aged 26)	Tavriya Simferopol	1992	19	2
	Serhiy Yashchenko	(Ukraine)	MF	25 June 1959 (aged 32)	CSKA Moscow	1982	338	40
Forwards
	Serhiy Atelkin	(Ukraine)	FW	8 January 1972 (aged 20)	Antratsyt Kirovske	1989	47	2
	**Serhiy Pohodin**	(Ukraine)	FW	29 April 1968 (aged 24)	Zorya Luhansk	1990	61	10
	**Serhii Rebrov**	(Ukraine)	FW	3 June 1974 (aged 18)	Academy	1991	35	14
	**Serhiy Scherbakov**	(Russia) / (Ukraine)	FW	15 August 1971 (aged 20)	Academy	1989	84	19

- Serhiy Scherbakov is a Russian footballer who played couple of friendlies for Ukraine in 1992.
- In **bold** are players who also played for the Ukraine national football team in 1992 (4 players).

== Transfers ==
=== In ===
Date	Pos.	Player	Moving from	Fee	Source
	GK	Andriy Kurayev	Antratsyt Kirovske		
	DF	Viktor Smihunov	Tavriya Simferopol		
	MF	Yuriy Fokin	Tavriya Simferopol		
	MF	Oleksandr Barabash	Neftianik Fergana		
	MF	Yuriy Bielichenko	Nyva Vinnytsia		
	MF	Serhiy Popov	Nyva Vinnytsia		
	MF	Yevhen Manko	Stal Komunarsk		

=== Out ===
Date	Pos.	Player	Moving to	Fee	Source
	FW	Serhiy Scherbakov	Sporting CP		
	FW	Serhii Rebrov	Dynamo Kyiv		
	DF	Vasyl Mazur	Zorya-MALS Luhansk		

== Competitions ==
=== Overall ===
Competition	First match	Last match	Starting round	Final position	Record							
Competition	First match	Last match	Starting round	Final position	Pld	W	D	L	GF	GA	GD	Win %
Vyshcha Liha	7 March 1992	21 June 1992	Matchday 1	4th	19	10	6	3	33	13	+20	52.63
Cup	1 March 1992	26 May 1992	Round of 16 (1/8)	Semifinals (1/2)	6	3	1	2	11	4	+7	50.00
Soviet Cup	4 September 1991	25 November 1991	Round of 32 (1/16)	Round of 16 (1/8)	4	2	1	1	3	3	+0	50.00
Total					29	15	8	6	47	20	+27	51.72

Source: Competitions

=== Premier League ===
==== League table ====
Pos	Team	Pld	W	D	L	GF	GA	GD	Pts	Qualification or relegation
1	Tavriya Simferopol (C)	18	11	6	1	30	9	+21	28	Qualification to Final playoff
2	Shakhtar Donetsk	18	10	6	2	31	10	+21	26	Qualification to Third place playoff
3	Chornomorets Odesa	18	9	7	2	30	12	+18	25	Qualification to Cup Winners' Cup qualifying round
4	Torpedo Zaporizhzhia	18	6	7	5	21	16	+5	19	
5	Metalurh Zaporizhzhia	18	6	6	6	20	19	+1	18	

Updated to match(es) played on unknown. Source:
Rules for classification: 1st points; 2nd wins; 3rd goal difference
(C) Champions

==== Results summary ====
Overall								Home						Away					
Pld	W	D	L	GF	GA	GD	Pts	W	D	L	GF	GA	GD	W	D	L	GF	GA	GD
18	10	6	2	31	10	+21	36	6	3	0	14	0	+14	4	3	2	17	10	+7

Source: 1992 Shakhtar season

==== Results by round ====
Round	1	2	3	4	5	6	7	8	9	10	11	12	13	14	15	16	17	18	19	20
Ground	A	A	H	H		H	A	A	H	H	A	A	H	H		A	A	A	H	H
Result	D	D	W	W		D	L	W	D	W	L	W	W	W		W	D	W	W	D
Position	5	6	2	1	2	2	4	2	2	2	4	4	3	3	3	3	3	3	2	2

Source: 1992 Shakhtar season
A = Away; H = Home; W = Win; D = Draw; L = Loss

==== Matches ====
7 March 1992 1	Metalurh Zaporizhia	1 – 1	Shakhtar Donetsk	Zaporizhia
?:? EET (UTC+02:00)	Holovan 38'	Report	Rebrov 78'; Drahunov (yellow card) 81'	Stadium: Metalurh Stadium; Attendance: 8,000; Referee: Valeriy Avdysh (Simferopol)

10 March 1992 2	Tavriya Simferopol	1 – 1	Shakhtar Donetsk	Simferopol
?:? EET (UTC+02:00)	Shevchenko 65'	Report	Fokin (yellow card) 24'; Drahunov 49' (pen.); Stolovytskyi (yellow card) 66'	Stadium: Lokomotyv Stadium; Attendance: 2,000; Referee: Oleksandr Dehtiaryov (Odesa)

18 March 1992 3	Shakhtar Donetsk	5 – 0	Nyva Vinnytsia	Donetsk
17:30 EET (UTC+02:00)	Rebrov 10', 47'; Pohodin 26', 63'; Atelkin 59'	Report		Stadium: Shakhtar Stadium; Attendance: 690; Referee: Volodymyr Tukhovskyi (Simferopol)

21 March 1992 4	Shakhtar Donetsk	2 – 0	Kremin Kremenchuk	Donetsk
?:? EET (UTC+02:00)	Bielichenko 14'; Popov (yellow card) 69'; Pohodin 75'	Report	Isayev (yellow card) 34'; Dudka (yellow card) 74' (yellow-red card) 85'	Stadium: Shakhtar Stadium; Attendance: 1,500; Referee: Vasyl Melnychuk (Simferopol)

30 March 1992 6	Shakhtar Donetsk	0 – 0	Torpedo Zaporizhia	Donetsk
17:30 EET (UTC+02:00)		Report	Volkov (yellow card) 10'; Nefedov (yellow card) 55'; Bondarenko (yellow card) 58'	Stadium: Shakhtar Stadium; Attendance: 1,650; Referee: Volodymyr Tukhovskyi (Simferopol)

5 April 1992 7	Karpaty Lviv	1 – 0	Shakhtar Donetsk	Lviv
16:00 EET (UTC+02:00)	Mushchinka 32'	Report	Fokin (yellow card) 83'	Stadium: Ukraina Stadium; Attendance: 5,500; Referee: Vadym Shevchenko (Kyiv)

8 April 1992 8	Temp Shepetivka	0 – 4	Shakhtar Donetsk	Shepetivka
?:? EET (UTC+02:00)		Report	Rebrov 11', 24', 64'; Manko 89'	Stadium: Temp Stadium; Attendance: 10,000; Referee: Leonid Bavykin (Kharkiv)

16 April 1992 9	Shakhtar Donetsk	0 – 0	Chornomorets Odesa	Donetsk
?:? EET (UTC+02:00)		Report		Stadium: Shakhtar Stadium; Attendance: 3,100; Referee: Valeriy Avdysh (Simferopol)

19 April 1992 10	Shakhtar Donetsk	2 – 0	Evis Mykolaiv	Donetsk
?:? EET (UTC+02:00)	Pohodin 11'; Popov 19'	Report	Hrozov (yellow card) 18'; Fomenko (yellow card) 85'	Stadium: Shakhtar Stadium; Attendance: 2,500; Referee: Serhiy Tatulyan (Kyiv)

25 April 1992 11	Chornomorets Odesa	3 – 0	Shakhtar Donetsk	Odesa
15:00 EET (UTC+02:00)	Hetsko 12' (pen.); Husyev 34'; Tsymbalar 85'	Report	Bielichenko (yellow card) 73'	Stadium: BSS Central Stadium; Attendance: 4,000; Referee: Yaroslav Hrysio (Lviv)

3 June 1992 12 (postponed)	Evis Mykolaiv	1 – 6	Shakhtar Donetsk	Mykolaiv
?:? EET (UTC+02:00)	Zhenylenko (yellow card) 32'; Mashnin 59' (pen.)	Report	Rebrov 5', 25', 35'; Scherbakov 6'; Pohodin 36'; Shutkov (yellow card) 57'; Yashchenko 72'	Stadium: Tsentralnyi Stadion; Attendance: 7,000; Referee: Viktor Holovko (Dnipropetrovsk)

8 May 1992 13	Shakhtar Donetsk	1–0	Karpaty Lviv	Donetsk
18:00 EET (UTC+02:00)	Drahunov 49' (pen.); Schebakov (penalty missed) 64'; Popov (yellow card) 68'	Report		Stadium: Shakhtar Stadium; Attendance: 500; Referee: Valeriy Lysenko (Odesa)

10 May 1992 14	Shakhtar Donetsk	2–0	Temp Shepetivka	Donetsk
?:? EEST (UTC+03:00)	Rebrov 66'; Scherbakov 68'	Report		Stadium: Shakhtar Stadium; Attendance: 2,500; Referee: Anatoliy Aranovskyi (Kyiv)

21 May 1992 16	Torpedo Zaporizhia	1–2	Shakhtar Donetsk	Zaporizhia
17:00 EEST (UTC+03:00)	Zayets 25'; Ivanov (yellow card) 55'; Bakalov (yellow card) 85'	Report	Bielichenko 27', (yellow card) 69'; Popov 88'	Stadium: AutoZAZ Stadium; Attendance: 4,000; Referee: Valeriy Lysenko (Odesa)

6 June 1992 17	Nyva Vinnytsia	0–0	Shakhtar Donetsk	Vinnytsia
17:00 EEST (UTC+03:00)		Report	Scherbakov (yellow card) 64'; Drahunov (yellow card) 76'	Stadium: Lokomotyv Stadium; Attendance: 10,000; Referee: Vadym Shevchenko (Kyiv)

9 June 1992 18	Kremin Kremenchuk	2–3	Shakhtar Donetsk	Kremenchuk
?:? EEST (UTC+03:00)	Laktionov 9', 48'	Report	Rebrov 7'; Rebrov (penalty missed) 29'; Scherbakov 38'; Fokin 55'	Stadium: Dnipro Stadium; Attendance: 10,000; Referee: Leonid Bavykin (Kharkiv)

14 June 1992 19	Shakhtar Donetsk	2–0	Metalurh Zaporizhia	Donetsk
?:? EEST (UTC+03:00)	Drahunov 74' (pen.); Stolovytskyi 76'	Report	Vernydub (yellow card) 12'	Stadium: Shakhtar Stadium; Attendance: 1,100; Referee: Yaroslav Hrysyo (Lviv)

17 June 1992 20	Shakhtar Donetsk	0–0	Tavriya Simferopol	Donetsk
?:? EEST (UTC+03:00)	Popov (yellow card) 63'	Report	Kolesov (yellow card) 20'; Volkov (yellow card) 84'	Stadium: Shakhtar Stadium; Attendance: 4,300; Referee: Ihor Khiblin (Khmelnytskyi)

20 June 1992 3rd place	Dnipro Dnipropetrovsk	3–2	Shakhtar Donetsk	Zaporizhia
?:? EEST (UTC+03:00)	Tyshchenko 19'; Konovalov 38', 74'	Report	Martyuk (yellow card) 19'; Mazur (yellow card) 34'; Bielichenko 51'; Atelkin 80'	Stadium: Metalurh Stadium; Attendance: 3,000; Referee: Volodymyr Tukhovskyi (Simferopol)

Notes:

- At the Round 8 match goal on 64' was scored by Rebrov, but some sources have it to be scored by Schebakov. The website (www.uafootball.net.ua) that provides game report does not list Rebrov to score 3 goals for that game on 8 April in the list of hat-tricks (Hat-tricks).

=== Ukrainian Cup ===
1 March 1992 Round of 16 (1/8)	Karpaty Lviv	1–2	Shakhtar Donetsk	Lviv
?:? EET (UTC+02:00)	Zabranskyi (yellow card) 13'; Synytskyi (yellow card) 69'; Mokrytsky 68' (pen.)	Report	Smyhunov (yellow card) 13'; Popov 23'; Drahunov 71' (pen.)	Stadium: Ukraina Stadium; Attendance: 12,500; Referee: Oleksandr Dehtiariov (Odesa)

14 March 1992 Round of 16 (1/8)	Shakhtar Donetsk	2–0	Karpaty Lviv	Donetsk
?:? EET (UTC+02:00)	Scherbakov 8'; Bielichenko (yellow card) 34'; Popov 75'	Report	Chikalo (yellow card) 14'	Stadium: Shakhtar Stadium; Attendance: 1,000; Referee: Kostiantyn Panchyk (Simferopol)

11 April 1992 Quarterfinals (1/4)	Shakhtar Donetsk	6–0	Dnipro Dnipropetrovsk	Donetsk
16:00 EET (UTC+02:00)	Scherbakov 3', 21'; Rebrov 29'; Pohodin 30', 87'; Martyuk 65'	Report		Stadium: Shakhtar Stadium; Attendance: 1,313; Referee: Oleksandr Dehtiariov (Odesa)

3 May 1992 Quarterfinals (1/4)	Dnipro Dnipropetrovsk	1–0	Shakhtar Donetsk	Dnipropetrovsk
?:? EET (UTC+02:00)	Konovalov 3'; Medin (yellow card) 70'	Report		Stadium: Meteor Stadium; Attendance: 900; Referee: Valeriy Avdysh (Simferopol)

14 May 1992 Semifinals (1/2)	Shakhtar Donetsk	0–1	Metalist Kharkiv	Donetsk
?:? EET (UTC+02:00)	Drahunov (yellow card) 20'; Yashchenko (yellow card) 40'	Report	Mykolayenko (yellow card) 35'; Kolesnyk 37'	Stadium: Shakhtar Stadium; Attendance: 6,500; Referee: Valeriy Avdysh (Simferopol)

26 May 1992 Semifinals (1/2)	Metalist Kharkiv	1–1	Shakhtar Donetsk	Kharkiv
18:30 EET (UTC+02:00)	Kolesnyk 25'; Medin (yellow card) 70'	Report	Fokin 2'	Stadium: Metalist Stadium; Attendance: 6,000; Referee: Yaroslav Hrysyo (Lviv)

=== Soviet Cup ===
4 September 1991 Round of 32 (1/16)	Spartak Nalchik	1–1	Shakhtar Donetsk	Nalchik
?:?	Kugotov 8'	Report	Yevseyev 32'; Kobozev (yellow card)	Stadium: Republican Stadium Spartak; Attendance: 5,000; Referee: Gevorg Oganesyan (Yerevan)

17 November 1991 Round of 32 (1/16)	Shakhtar Donetsk	w/o	Spartak Nalchik
?:?		Report

22 November 1991 Round of 16 (1/8)	Chornomorets Odesa	2–0	Shakhtar Donetsk	Odesa
17:00	Nikiforov 9'; Hetsko 64'; Telesnenko (yellow card)	Report		Stadium: Central Stadium BSS; Attendance: 3,000; Referee: Volodymyr Tukhovskyi (Simferopol)

26 November 1991 Round of 16 (1/8)	Shakhtar Donetsk	2–0 (a.e.t.) (6–7 p)	Chornomorets Odesa	Donetsk
?:?	Stolovytskyi 69'; Rebrov 75'; Onopko (yellow card) 107'	Report	Sak (yellow card) 115'	Stadium: Shakhtar Stadium; Attendance: 1,500; Referee: Andrei Budogosskiy (Moscow)
	Penalties
	Leonov (penalty scored); Onopko (penalty missed); Pohodin (penalty scored); Drahunov (penalty scored); Scherbakov (penalty scored); Martyuk (penalty scored); Kryventsov (penalty scored); Yashchenko (penalty missed)		(penalty missed) Koshelyuk; (penalty scored) Nikiforov; (penalty scored) Spitsyn; (penalty scored) Shelepnytskyi; (penalty scored) Hetsko; (penalty scored) Tretyak; (penalty scored) Sak; (penalty scored) Suslov
