= 1992–93 Ukrainian Second League =

Ukrainian Second League
- Season: 1992–93
- Champions: Dnipro Cherkasy
- Promoted: Dnipro Cherkasy; Khimik Zhytomyr
- Relegated: CSK ZSU Kyiv
- Top goalscorer: 20 - S.Matviiv (Dnipro)

The 1992–93 Ukrainian Second League was the second season of 3rd level professional football in Ukraine. The League was reorganized into a single group for the next several seasons. The season started on August 17, 1992, and finished on July 3, 1993.

== Teams ==
Due to competition reorganization there were no teams promoted from a lower tier. The Second League was created by combining 10 less fortunate teams that previously played in the First League with 8 better teams that previously played in the Transition League. The other 10 less fortunate teams of the last season Transition League were moved to the newly established lower tier also named Transition League where they will compete with better amateur teams.

=== Promoted teams ===
None

=== Relegated teams ===
Debut for all teams previously playing in the First League

- Azovets Mariupol
- Vahonobudivnyk Stakhanov
- Halychyna Drohobych
- Dnipro Cherkasy
- SKA Kyiv
- Krystal Kherson
- Polissya Zhytomyr
- Chaika Sevastopol
- Chornomorets-2 Odesa
- Shakhtar-2 Donetsk

=== Renamed teams ===
- In August 1992 SKA Kyiv changed its name to ZS-Oriyana Kyiv, ZS is an acronym for Armed Forces (Zbroini Syly).
- Soon after the start of the season on September 8, 1992 Polissya changed its name to Khimik Zhytomyr coming under the sponsorship of the local chemical plant.
- During the winter break Krystal changed its name to Tavriya Kherson.
- During the winter break Shakhtar-2 changed its name to Metalurh Kostyantynivka as the team was stationed in Kostyantynivka since 1992.
- On May 21, 1993 ZS-Oriyana changed its name to more common and recognizable CSK ZSU Kyiv (Central Sports Club of the Armed Forces of Ukraine).

=== Location map ===
Locations of team home grounds in Ukrainian Second League 1992-93

=== Stadiums ===
Team	Stadium	Position in 1L 1992
Khimik Zhytomyr	Khimik Stadium	A 10th
Tavriya Kherson	Krystal Stadium	B 10th
Halychyna Drohobych	Kranivnyk Stadium	A 11th
Azovets Mariupol	Novator Stadium Azovstal Stadium	B 11th
Dnipro Cherkasy	Central City Stadium	A 12th
Shakhtar-2/Metalurh	Stadion imeni Frunze Avtoshkla Stadium Metalurh Stadium	B 12th
Chaika Sevastopol	Chaika Stadium	A 13th
Vahonobudivnyk Stakhanov	Peremoha Stadium	B 13th
ZS-Oriana/CSK ZSU	SKA/CSK ZSU Stadium	A 14th
Chornomorets-2 Odesa	IZhBK Lokomotyv Stadium, Oleksandrivka SKA Stadium, Odesa	B 14th

Team	Stadium	Position in TL 1992
Dnister Zalishchyky	Dnister Stadium	A 1st
Bazhanovets Makiivka	Avanhard Stadium	B 1st
Hazovyk Komarno	Hazovyk Stadium	A 2nd
Tytan Armyansk	Khimik Stadium	B 2nd
Yavir Krasnopillia	Kolos Stadium	A 3rd
Meliorator Kakhovka	Avanhard Stadium Olimpiyskiy Stadium	B 3rd
Zirka Kirovohrad	Zirka Stadium	A 4th
Druzhba Osypenko	Torpedo Stadium Olimpiets Stadium, Prymorsk Enerhiya Stadium	B 4th

== Managers ==
Club	Head coach	Replaced coach
Khimik Zhytomyr	(Ukraine) Oleksandr Ishchenko	
Tavriya Kherson	(Ukraine) Oleksandr Sapelniak	(Ukraine) Anatoliy Lebid (Ukraine) Viktor Maslov
Halychyna Drohobych	(Ukraine) Jose Turchyk (Khose Turchyk)	
Azovets Mariupol	(Ukraine) Yuriy Kerman	
Dnipro Cherkasy	(Kyrgyzstan) Semen Osynovskyi	(Ukraine) Viktor Zhylin (until September 1992)
Metalurh Kostiantynivka	(Ukraine) Yevhen Korol	
Chaika Sevastopol	(Ukraine) Vasyl Borys	
Vahonobudivnyk Stakhanov	(Ukraine) Oleksandr Tkachenko	
CSK ZSU Kyiv	(Ukraine) Anatoliy Demyanenko	(Ukraine) Oleh Feshchukov (Ukraine) Viktor Ishchenko
Chornomorets-2 Odesa	(Ukraine) Oleksandr Skrypnyk	(Ukraine) Vitaliy Sidnyov
Dnister Zalishchyky	(Ukraine) Ihor Lysak	
Bazhanovets Makiivka	(Ukraine) Viktor Pyshchev	
Hazovyk Komarno	(Ukraine) Ivan Pukalskyi	(Ukraine) Stepan Yurchyshyn
Tytan Armyansk	(Ukraine) Eduard Fedin	
Yavir Krasnopillia	(Ukraine) Volodymyr Bohach	(Ukraine) Valeriy Dushkov
Meliorator Kakhovka	(Ukraine) Serhiy Shevchenko	
Zirka Kirovohrad	(Ukraine) Mykola Fedorenko	
Druzhba Osypenko	(Ukraine) Mykola Liutyi	

== Standings ==
Pos	Team	Pld	W	D	L	GF	GA	GD	Pts	Promotion or relegation
1	Dnipro Cherkasy (C, P)	34	20	9	5	59	33	+26	49	Promoted to First League
2	Khimik Zhytomyr (P)	34	20	9	5	53	29	+24	49	Promoted to First League
3	Yavir Krasnopillia	34	17	7	10	42	27	+15	41	
4	Zirka Kirovohrad	34	16	9	9	50	33	+17	41	
5	Meliorator Kakhovka	34	16	9	9	45	37	+8	41	
6	Chaika Sevastopol	34	13	10	11	57	45	+12	36	
7	Hazovyk Komarne	34	13	8	13	37	47	−10	34	
8	Bazhanovets Makiivka	34	11	11	12	38	45	−7	33	
9	Halychyna Drohobych	34	13	6	15	42	40	+2	32	
10	Tavriya Kherson	34	12	8	14	33	29	+4	32	
11	Shakhtar-2 Donetsk	34	10	12	12	33	30	+3	32	
12	Vahonobudivnyk Stakhanov	34	11	8	15	39	34	+5	30	
13	Azovets Mariupol	34	9	11	14	34	47	−13	29	
14	Druzhba Berdiansk	34	8	12	14	30	49	−19	28	
15	Dnister Zalischyky	34	11	5	18	30	45	−15	27	
16	Chornomorets-2 Odesa	34	8	11	15	36	43	−7	27	
17	Tytan Armyansk	34	10	6	18	42	54	−12	26	
18	CSK ZSU Kyiv (R)	34	9	7	18	27	50	−23	25	Relegated to Third League

Source: uafootball.net.ua
(C) Champions; (P) Promoted; (R) Relegated

=== Top goalscorers ===
	Scorer	Goals (Pen.)	Team
1	Stepan Matviiv	20 (8)	Dnipro Cherkasy
2	Vasyl Herasymchuk	15 (5)	Chaika Sevastopol
3	Oleh Vietrov	13 (6)	Bazhanovets Makiivka

1992-93 Second League winner

1st title

== Number of teams by region ==
Number	Region	Team(s)
3	Donetsk Oblast	Metalurh Kostiantynivka, Azovets Mariupol, Bazhanovets Makiivka
2	Lviv Oblast	Hazovyk Komarno, Halychyna Drohobych
2	Kherson Oblast	Krystal Kherson, Meliorator Kakhovka
1	Cherkasy Oblast	Dnipro Cherkasy
1	Crimea	Tytan Armyansk
1	Kirovohrad Oblast	Zirka Kirovohrad
1	Kyiv	CSK ZSU Kyiv
1	Luhansk Oblast	Vahonobudivnyk Stakhanov
1	Odesa Oblast	Chornomorets-2 Odesa
1	Sevastopol	Chaika Sevastopol
1	Sumy Oblast	Yavir Krasnopillia
1	Ternopil Oblast	Dnister Zalishchyky
1	Zaporizhia Oblast	Druzhba Berdyansk
1	Zhytomyr Oblast	Khimik Zhytomyr

== See also ==
- 1992-93 Ukrainian First League
- 1992-93 Ukrainian Third League
- 1992-93 Ukrainian Cup
