= Volodymyr Mykyta =

Ukrainian painter (1931–2025)

- Born: Volodymyr Vasyliovych Mykyta; 1 February 1931; Rakoshyno, Subcarpathian Ruthenia, Czechoslovakia
- Died: 16 July 2025 (aged 94); Uzhhorod, Zakarpattia Oblast, Ukraine
- Occupation: Painter
- Website: mykyta.com.ua

Volodymyr Vasyliovych Mykyta (Ukrainian: Володимир Васильович Микита; 1 February 1931 – 16 July 2025) was a Ukrainian painter. He was a recipient of the Shevchenko National Prize (2005).

== Life and career ==
Born in Rakoshyno and educated in Uzhhorod, both in the Zakarpattia Oblast of western Ukraine, his paintings depict the landscapes and peasants of Transcarpathia.

According to Art in the Soviet Union, his paintings give an impression of "warm affection and gentle humour."

Mykyta died in Uzhhorod, Zakarpattia Oblast on 16 July 2025, at the age of 94.
