= 2007 Football Championship of Zaporizhzhia Oblast =

Football Championship of Zaporizhia Oblast
- Season: 2007
- Champions: Illich Osypenko

The 2007 Football Championship of Zaporizhia Oblast was won by Illich Osypenko.

== League table ==
Pos	Team	Pld	W	D	L	GF	GA	GD	Pts
1	Illich Osypenko (C)	18	16	1	1	49	10	+39	49
2	FC Petrivka	18	14	1	3	46	12	+34	43
3	Spartak Zaporizhia	18	9	5	4	27	21	+6	32
4	Motor Sich Zaporizhia	18	10	0	8	38	39	−1	30
5	FC Berdiansk	18	7	4	7	24	30	−6	25
6	Tavria Novomykolaivka	18	7	2	9	18	23	−5	23
7	Metalist Tokmak	18	6	2	10	21	29	−8	20
8	Dynamo Zaporizhia	18	5	1	12	25	18	+7	16
9	Olimpiets Prymorsk	18	3	3	12	16	58	−42	12
10	Izotop-ZAES Enerhodar	18	2	3	13	12	43	−31	9

Source: ""Ильич-Осипенко"". football.tulja.in.ua. Archived from the original on 2022-09-13.
(C) Champions
- Dynamo Zaporizhia withdrew from competitions after the first half
