= Ivan Korponai =

Ukrainian footballer

Ivan Korponay
Personal information
- Full name: Ivan Tyberiyovych Korponay
- Date of birth: 13 February 1969 (age 57)
- Place of birth: Rakoshyno, Ukrainian SSR (now Ukraine)
- Height: 1.86 m (6 ft 1 in)
- Position: Striker

Senior career*
Years	Team	Apps	(Gls)
1990	Zakarpattia Uzhhorod	36	(2)
1990–1992	Kremin Kremenchuk	45	(9)
1992	Metalurh Zaporizhzhia	15	(6)
1993–1994	Nyva Ternopil	37	(6)
1994–1996	Kremin Kremenchuk	59	(22)
1996–1999	Dnipro Dnipropetrovsk	31	(6)
1997–1998	→ Mykolaiv (loan)	27	(8)
1998	→ Nyva Vinnytsia (loan)	18	(6)
1999	Prykarpattia Ivano-Frankivsk	1	(0)
2000	Chornomorets Odesa	4	(0)
2000	→ Chornomorets-2 Odesa	2	(0)
2002	Atyrau	14	(3)
2003	Uholyok Dymytrov	3	(0)
2004	Zakarpattia Uzhhorod	1	(0)
Total		293	(68)
- * Club domestic league appearances and goals

Ivan Tyberiyovych Korponay (Ukrainian: Іван Тиберійович Корпонай; born 13 February 1969) is a Ukrainian retired footballer who played as a striker.

== Playing career ==
Korponay was born in Rakoshyno, Zakarpattia Oblast, Ukrainian SSR, Soviet Union (now Ukraine). From an early age, he was involved with football. His first team was Zakarpattia Uzhhorod. He then joined his brother Adalbert at Kremin Kremenchuk. On 7 March 1992, Korponay became Kremin Kremenchuk's first-ever goalscorer in the Vyshcha Liha, then the Ukrainian top flight. He was also the team's top scorer for the season with 7 goals.

== Managing career ==
After retiring as a player, Ivan coached youth teams in Zakarpattia Oblast with his older brother Tyberiy. By 2021, however, he was no longer involved with football.
