= Vyacheslav Nedorostkov =

Russian footballer

Personal information
- Full name: Vyacheslav Valeryevich Nedorostkov
- Date of birth: 5 July 1967 (age 59)
- Place of birth: Stepnoye, Russian SFSR
- Height: 1.74 m (5 ft 8 1/2 in)
- Positions: Forward; midfielder

Youth career
- SEPO Saratov

Senior career*
Years	Team	Apps	(Gls)
1984–1985	FC Sokol Saratov	11	(0)
1986–1988	FC Start Ulyanovsk	68	(1)
1989	FC ShVSM-SKA Kuybyshev	13	(0)
1989	FC Krylia Sovetov Kuybyshev	17	(2)
1990	FC Sokol Saratov	27	(5)
1991	FC Zhemchuzhina Sochi	35	(13)
1992	FC Temp Shepetivka	13	(2)
1992–1993	FC Nyva Ternopil	13	(1)
1993	FC Tekstilshchik Kamyshin	1	(0)
1993–1995	FC Zvezda Gorodishche	75	(13)
1996–1997	FC Svetotekhnika Saransk	68	(3)
1998–1999	FC Nosta Novotroitsk	47	(8)
2000	FC Khopyor Balashov	14	(1)
2001	FC Metallurg Zlatoust (amateur)		
- * Club domestic league appearances and goals

Vyacheslav Valeryevich Nedorostkov (Russian: Вячеслав Валерьевич Недоростков; born 5 July 1967 in Stepnoye) is a former Russian football player.
