= FC Tytan Donetsk =

Tytan Donetsk
- Full name: FC Tytan Donetsk
- Founded: 2002
- Dissolved: 2009
- Ground: Stadion Smolianka, Donetsk
- Chairman: Mykolai Drach
- Manager: Evhen Korol
- League: Druha Liha
- 2008–2009: 9th (Withdrawn)

FC Tytan Donetsk (Ukrainian: Титан Донецьк) was a professional football team based in Donetsk, Ukraine. Tytan Donetsk entered the professional competition in 2007. Titan Donetsk currently compete in the Druha Liha B. After the 2008–2009 season the club withdrew from the PFL.

== League and cup history ==
| Season | Div. | Pos. | Pl. | W | D | L | GS | GA | P | Domestic Cup | Europe | Notes |
|---|---|---|---|---|---|---|---|---|---|---|---|---|
| 2007–08 | 3rd "B" | 11 | 34 | 11 | 7 | 16 | 44 | 52 | 40 | Did not enter | | |
| 2008–09 | 3rd "B" | 9 | 34 | 12 | 11 | 11 | 37 | 33 | 47 | 1/64 finals | | Withdrew |

== Managers ==
- 2006–2009 Yevhen Korol
- 2009–2009 Serhiy Pohodin
