= Adalbert Korponay =

Soviet-Ukrainian footballer

Personal information
- Full name: Adalbert Korponay
- Date of birth: 18 February 1966
- Place of birth: Rakoshyno, Ukrainian SSR, Soviet Union
- Date of death: 23 April 2017 (aged 51)
- Place of death: Shatsk, Ukraine
- Height: 1.91 m (6 ft 3 in)
- Position: Forward

Senior career*
Years	Team	Apps	(Gls)
1987–1988	Torpedo Lutsk	67	(9)
1989	Kremin Kremenchuk	40	(5)
1990	Metalist Kharkiv	1	(0)
1990–1992	Kremin Kremenchuk	72	(16)
1992	Metalurh Zaporizhia	11	(0)
1993–1995	Kremin Kremenchuk	55	(5)
1995	Mykolaiv	3	(0)
1995–1997	Kremin Kremenchuk	40	(6)
1996–1999	Vinnytsia	57	(5)
2000–2001	Kovel-Volyn Kovel		
- * Club domestic league appearances and goals

Adalbert Korponay (18 February 1966 – 23 April 2017) was a Soviet–Ukrainian football striker.

He had two older brothers Ivan and Tiberiy together with whom he used to play for FC Kremin Kremenchuk. He also played five games in 1990 for FC Metalist Kharkiv.
