= Mykola Zuyenko =

Soviet footballer and Ukrainian coach

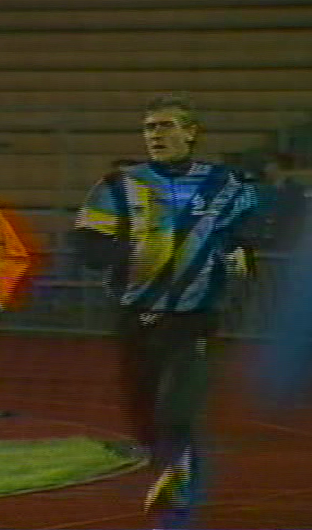

Personal information
- Full name: Mykola Mykolayovych Zuyenko
- Date of birth: 10 November 1972 (age 53)
- Place of birth: Voroshylovhrad, Ukrainian SSR, USSR
- Height: 1.84 m (6 ft 0 in)
- Position: Defender

Senior career*
Years	Team	Apps	(Gls)
1989–1992	Zorya Luhansk	77	(1)
1992	Dnipro Cherkasy	0	(0)
1992–1993	Dynamo Kyiv	8	(0)
1992–1993	→ Dynamo-2 Kyiv	24	(4)
1994	Metalurh Zaporizhzhia	13	(0)
1994–1995	Nyva Vinnytsia	50	(4)
1996–2002	Prykarpattia Ivano-Frankivsk	145	(6)
1997	→ Tysmenytsia (loan)	4	(0)
1999	→ Enerhetyk Burshtyn (loan)	1	(0)
1999	→ Kalush (loan)	12	(2)
2000–2001	→ Prykarpattia-2 Ivano-Frankivsk	5	(0)
2002–2003	Desna Chernihiv	21	(0)
2003	Rohatyn	13	(2)
2004	Podillya Khmelnytskyi	7	(0)
2004	Ordabasy	6	(0)
- * Club domestic league appearances and goals

Mykola Mykolayovych Zuyenko (Ukrainian: Микола Миколайович Зуєнко) is a Ukrainian retired footballer who played as a defender.

== Honours ==
Dynamo Kyiv

- Ukrainian Premier League: 1992–93
- Ukrainian Cup: 1992–93
