= Serhiy Shubin =

Ukrainian footballer (born 1967)

Personal information
- Full name: Serhiy Anatoliyovych Shubin
- Date of birth: 22 February 1967 (age 59)
- Place of birth: Kyiv, Ukrainian SSR
- Height: 1.82 m (6 ft 0 in)
- Positions: Forward; midfielder

Youth career
- Dynamo Kyiv

Senior career*
Years	Team	Apps	(Gls)
1984	Dynamo Kyiv	0	(0)
1985	SKA Kyiv	2	(0)
1986–1987	FC Dynamo Odesa		
1988	Dynamo Moscow	0	(0)
1988	Torpedo Zaporizhzhia	34	(2)
1989–1993	Nyva Vinnytsia	145	(39)
1993–1994	Diósgyőr	24	(0)
1994–1995	Nyva Vinnytsia	20	(2)
1995	Volyn Lutsk	4	(2)
1995–1996	FC Krystal Chortkiv	14	(7)
1996–1997	Zhemchuzhina Sochi	10	(1)
1996–1997	→ Zhemchuzhina-2 Sochi (loan)	3	(2)
1998	Kuban Krasnodar	23	(1)
1999	Metallurg Lipetsk	19	(2)
1999–2000	FC Kirovets Mohyliv-Podilskyi		
2000–2003	FC Vinnytsia	67	(20)
- * Club domestic league appearances and goals

Serhiy Anatoliyovych Shubin (Ukrainian: Сергій Анатолійович Шубін; born 22 February 1967) is a Ukrainian former footballer who played as a forward and midfielder.
