= Oleksandr Nefedov =

Ukrainian footballer

Personal information
- Full name: Oleksandr Mykolayovych Nefedov
- Date of birth: 28 December 1966 (age 59)
- Place of birth: Zaporizhzhia, Ukrainian SSR
- Height: 1.84 m (6 ft 0 in)
- Position: Defender

Youth career
- Metalurh Zaporizhzhia

Senior career*
Years	Team	Apps	(Gls)
1984	Metalurh Zaporizhzhia	6	(0)
1985–1986	Dynamo Kyiv	0	(0)
1987–1990	Metalurh Zaporizhzhia	103	(0)
1991	Kryvbas Kryvyi Rih	12	(0)
1992–1994	Torpedo Zaporizhzhia	75	(0)
1994–1995	Nyva Vinnytsia	3	(0)
1995	Uralmash Yekaterinburg	1	(0)
1995–1996	Kryvbas Kryvyi Rih	6	(0)
1996–1997	Torpedo Zaporizhzhia	35	(1)
1997–1998	Dalis Komyshuvakha	7	(1)
- * Club domestic league appearances and goals

Oleksandr Mykolayovych Nefedov (Ukrainian: Олександр Миколайович Нефедов; born 28 December 1966) is a Ukrainian former football player.
