= Tyberiy Korponay =

Ukrainian footballer (1958–2021)

Personal information
- Full name: Tyberiy Tyberiyovych Korponay
- Date of birth: 15 July 1958
- Place of birth: Buy, Kostroma Oblast, Soviet Union
- Date of death: 5 January 2021 (aged 62)
- Positions: Defender; midfielder

Senior career*
Years	Team	Apps	(Gls)
1976	Speranța Drochia	3	(0)
1979	Hoverla Uzhhorod	28	(0)
1980	Avanhard Rivne	34	(4)
1980	Karpaty Lviv	0	(0)
1981–1982	Avanhard Rivne	53	(2)
1983	Bukovyna Chernivtsi	47	(3)
1984–1986	Zakarpattia Uzhhorod	11	(0)
1987	Torpedo Lutsk	28	(1)
1989	Kremin Kremenchuk	26	(2)

Managerial career
- 1993: Kremin Kremenchuk
- 1995: Kremin Kremenchuk
- 1995: Kremin Kremenchuk
- * Club domestic league appearances and goals

Tyberiy Tyberiyovych Korponay (Ukrainian: Тиберій Тиберійович Корпонай; 15 July 1958 – 5 January 2021) was a Soviet and Ukrainian football defender and football manager.

== Personal life ==
He had two younger brothers Adalbert and Ivan together with whom he used to play for Kremin Kremenchuk.
