= Andriy Chikalo =

Ukrainian footballer (1964–2008)

Personal information
- Full name: Andriy Bohdanovych Chikalo
- Date of birth: 21 January 1964
- Place of birth: Lviv, Soviet Union (now Ukraine)
- Date of death: 4 February 2008 (aged 44)
- Place of death: United States
- Height: 1.82 m (6 ft 0 in)
- Position: Defender

Youth career
- Lviv

Senior career*
Years	Team	Apps	(Gls)
1984–1989	Prykarpattya Ivano-Frankivsk	241	(7)
1989–1992	Karpaty Lviv	50	(0)
1992–1993	Hazovyk Komarno	34	(0)
1993–1997	Lviv	100	(1)

Managerial career
- Rava Rava-Ruska (youth) (coach)
- * Club domestic league appearances and goals as of 24 June 2022

Andriy Bohdanovych Chikalo (Ukrainian: Андрій Богданович Чікало; 21 January 1964 – 4 February 2008) was a Soviet and Ukrainian professional footballer who played as a defender.

== Career ==
=== Karpaty Lviv ===
On 6 March 1992 Benko played in the first ever match of the Vyshcha Liha (now called Ukrainian Premier League) for Karpaty Lviv against Chornomorets Odesa.

== Honours ==
Karpaty Lviv

- Soviet Second League, Zone West: 1991

Lviv

- Ukrainian Second League runner-up: 1994–95
