= Mikhail Zubchuk =

Russian footballer (1967–2015)

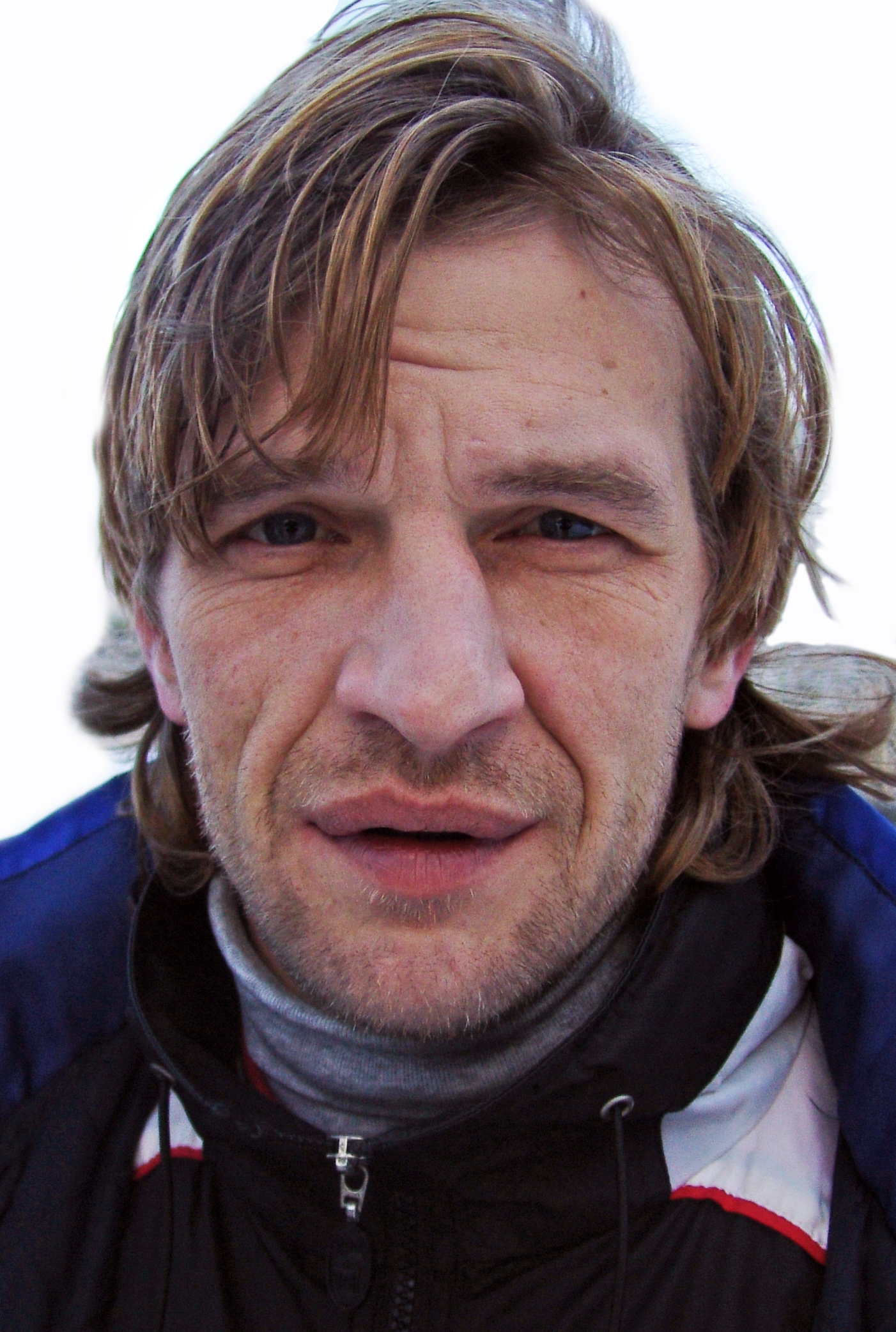
- Mikhail Zubchuk in 2005

Personal information
- Full name: Mikhail Petrovich Zubchuk
- Date of birth: 22 November 1967
- Place of birth: Moscow, Russian SFSR
- Date of death: 9 November 2015 (aged 47)
- Place of death: Moscow, Russia
- Height: 1.77 m (5 ft 9 1/2 in)
- Positions: Forward; midfielder

Youth career
- CSKA Moscow

Senior career*
Years	Team	Apps	(Gls)
1984	Torpedo Moscow	0	(0)
1986–1987	CSKA-2 Moscow	51	(6)
1987	CSKA Moscow	1	(0)
1988	Sudostroitel Mykolaiv	36	(5)
1989	Metalurh Zaporizhzhia	3	(0)
1989–1990	Sudostroitel Mykolaiv	58	(8)
1990	Avtomobilist Yakutsk		
1991	Kryvbas Kryvyi Rih	48	(22)
1992	Nyva Vinnytsia	29	(5)
1993	Tighina Bender	3	(1)
1994–1995	Saturn Ramenskoye	73	(22)
1996–1997	Fakel Voronezh	50	(16)
1997	→ Fakel-d Voronezh (loan)	3	(1)
1997	Arsenal Tula	17	(4)
1998	Lada-Togliatti-VAZ	17	(1)
1998	Saturn Ramenskoye	19	(1)
1999	Fakel Voronezh	8	(1)
1999	Torpedo-Viktoriya Nizhny Novgorod	19	(6)
2000	Metallurg Lipetsk	13	(1)
2000	Dynamo Vologda	14	(6)
2001	Metallurg Krasnoyarsk	14	(1)
2001–2002	Presnya Moscow (amateur)		
2003	Uralan Plus Moscow	5	(1)
2003	Alla-L Lobnya (amateur)		
2004	Balashikha		
2005	Serpukhov (amateur)		
2006	Spartak-Avto Moscow		
2007	Boyevoye Bratstvo Krasnoarmeysk		
2008	Metallist Domodedovo		
- * Club domestic league appearances and goals

Mikhail Petrovich Zubchuk (Russian: Михаил Петрович Зубчук; 22 November 1967 – 9 November 2015) was a Russian footballer.
