= Serhiy Krukovets =

Ukrainian footballer (born 1973)

Personal information
- Full name: Serhiy Mykhailovych Krukovets
- Date of birth: 1 July 1973 (age 53)
- Place of birth: Lutsk, Ukrainian SSR
- Height: 1.85 m (6 ft 1 in)
- Position: Defender

Senior career*
Years	Team	Apps	(Gls)
1990–1992	Volyn Lutsk	48	(0)
1992–1993	KSZO Ostrowiec Świętokrzyski	15	(2)
1993–1996	Volyn Lutsk	81	(13)
1996–1998	Torpedo Moscow	35	(0)
1999–2000	Lokomotiv Nizhny Novgorod	39	(1)
2000–2001	Prykarpattya Ivano-Frankivsk	14	(1)
2001	Kuban Krasnodar	4	(0)
2001–2002	Metallurg Krasnoyarsk	26	(0)
2002	Salyut-Energiya Belgorod	14	(0)
2003	[[FC Zhenis]Zhenis]]	25	(0)
2004–2005	Nyva Vinnytsia	27	(0)
2005–2007	Naftovyk-Ukrnafta Okhtyrka	22	(0)
- * Club domestic league appearances and goals

Serhiy Mykhailovych Krukovets (Ukrainian: Сергій Михайлович Круковец; Russian: Серге́й Михайлович Круковец; born 1 July 1973) is a Ukrainian former professional footballer who played as a defender.

== Career ==
Krukovets made his professional debut in the Soviet Second League in 1990 for FC Volyn Lutsk. He played one game in the 1996–97 UEFA Cup for FC Torpedo-Luzhniki Moscow.

== Honours ==
- Kazakhstan Premier League 3rd place: 2003.
