= Roman Zub =

Ukrainian footballer

Personal information
- Full name: Roman Ivanovych Zub
- Date of birth: 16 February 1967 (age 59)
- Place of birth: Lviv, Ukraine
- Positions: Defender; midfielder

Senior career*
Years	Team	Apps	(Gls)
1984–1987	Dynamo Kyiv	0	(0)
1987-1988	Zorya Voroshilovgrad	31	(2)
1989	SKA Karpaty Lviv	32	(1)
1990	Halychyna Drohobych	13	(0)
1990–1992	Volyn Lutsk	59	(6)
1993	Legia Warsaw	10	(0)
1994–1997	Karpaty Lviv	77	(10)
1997	→ Karpaty-2 Lviv	2	(0)
1998	Prykarpattia Ivano-Frankivsk	8	(0)
1998–1999	Nyva Vinnytsia	18	(4)
1999–2000	Karpaty Lviv	6	(0)
1999–2000	→ Karpaty-2 Lviv	9	(5)
2000–2001	Polihraftekhnika Oleksandriya	32	(3)
2001	Zirka Kirovohrad	4	(0)
2002	Neftçi Baku	3	(0)
2002	Volyn Lutsk	2	(0)
2002	Sokil Zolochiv	7	(1)
- * Club domestic league appearances and goals

Roman Ivanovych Zub (Ukrainian: Роман Іванович Зуб; born 16 February 1967) is a Ukrainian former professional footballer.
