= Ihor Plotko =

Personal information
- Full name: Ihor Volodymyrovych Plotko
- Date of birth: 9 June 1966 (age 60)
- Place of birth: Dnipropetrovsk, Ukrainian SSR, Soviet Union
- Height: 1.75 m (5 ft 9 in)
- Position: Midfielder

Youth career
- Zavod Karla Libknekhta

Senior career*
Years	Team	Apps	(Gls)
1989–1991	FC Kolos Nikopol	120	(42)
1992	FC Volyn Lutsk	18	(3)
1992–1994	FC Karpaty Lviv	60	(8)
1994–1995	FC Dnipro Dnipropetrovsk	15	(1)
1995	FC Metalurh Nikopol	4	(0)
1995–1996	FC Torpedo Zaporizhia	13	(1)
1996	FC Metalurh Zaporizhia	23	(1)
1997	FC Kryvbas Kryvyi Rih	13	(2)
1997–1998	FC Karpaty Lviv	26	(3)
1998–2000	FC Metalurh Mariupol	65	(10)
2000	→FC Metalurh-2 Mariupol	1	(0)
2001–2002	PFC Olexandria	42	(2)
2007–2008	FC Lokomotyv-Veteran Dnipropetrovsk	17	(8)
2007	FC Sevash Dnipropetrovsk	17	(8)
2008	FC StekloPlast Dnipropetrovsk	14	(1)
2010	FC Shturm Partyzanske	2	(0)

Managerial career
- 2012–2017: FC Dnipro Dnipropetrovsk (youth team assistant)
- * Club domestic league appearances and goals

Ihor Plotko (Ukrainian: Ігор Плотко) is a former Soviet and Ukrainian midfielder.
