= Stepnoye, Sovetsky District, Saratov Oblast =

Stepnoye Степное
- Urban-type settlement
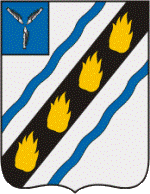
- Coat of arms
- Interactive map of Stepnoye
- Location of Stepnoye Stepnoye (Saratov Oblast)
- Coordinates: 51.3767°N 46.8454°E
- Country: Russia
- Federal subject: Saratov Oblast
- Administrative district: Sovetsky District
- Founded: 1767

Population (2010 Census)
  - Total: 13,136
  - Estimate (2021): 12,355 (−5.9%)
- Time zone: UTC+4 (MSK+1)
- Postal codes: 413210, 413211
- OKTMO ID: 63644151051

Stepnoye (Russian: Степное) is an urban locality (an urban-type settlement) in Sovetsky District of Saratov Oblast, Russia. Population: 13,136 (2010 census); 14,140 (2002 census); 14,083 (1989 Soviet census).
