= Roman Rusanovskyi =

Ukrainian footballer (born 1972)

Personal information
- Full name: Roman Yevhenovych Rusanovskyi
- Date of birth: 8 October 1972 (age 54)
- Place of birth: Kalush, Ukrainian SSR
- Height: 1.85 m (6 ft 1 in)
- Positions: Defender; midfielder

Youth career
- RShSI Kyiv

Senior career*
Years	Team	Apps	(Gls)
1990	FC Dynamo Bila Tserkva	24	(1)
1991–1996	FC Prykarpattya Ivano-Frankivsk	179	(3)
1996	FC Khutrovyk Tysmenytsia	1	(0)
1996–1998	FC Chernomorets Novorossiysk	45	(1)
1999	FC Kalush	11	(0)
2000–2003	FC Illichivets Mariupol	86	(1)
2003	→ FC Illichivets-2 Mariupol (loan)	1	(0)
2004	FC Spartak Ivano-Frankivsk	18	(0)
2004	→ FC Prykarpattya Kalush (loans)	3	(0)
2005–2006	FC Enerhetyk Burshtyn	21	(1)
2006–2007	FC Tsementnyk Yamnytsia		
2011	FC Hal-Vapno-Enerhetyk Halych		
2011	FC Kalush (amateur)		
- * Club domestic league appearances and goals

Roman Yevhenovych Rusanovskyi (Ukrainian: Роман Євгенович Русановський; born 8 October 1972) is a Ukrainian former football player.
