= Volodymyr Riznyk =

Ukrainian footballer

Personal information
- Date of birth: 15 February 1966 (age 60)
- Place of birth: Lviv, Ukrainian SSR
- Position: Midfielder

Senior career*
Years	Team	Apps	(Gls)
1985	Spartak Zhytomyr	15	(1)
1986–1991	Veres Rivne	241	(24)
1992–1995	Karpaty Lviv	85	(3)
1996	Hazovyk Komarno	18	(4)
1997–2001	Lviv	150	(8)
1999	→ Karpaty Lviv (loan)	2	(0)
1999	→ Karpaty-2 Lviv (loan)	1	(0)
2001–2002	Karpaty Lviv	6	(0)
2001–2002	→ Karpaty-2 Lviv	24	(0)
2002	→ Karpaty-3 Lviv	1	(0)
- * Club domestic league appearances and goals

Volodymyr Riznyk (born 15 February 1966) is a retired Ukrainian football midfielder.
