= Vitaliy Sidnyov =

Soviet footballer & coach (1948–1993)

Personal information
- Full name: Vitaliy Mendeleyovych Feidman (Sidnyov)
- Date of birth: 10 September 1948
- Place of birth: Chișinău, Moldavian SSR, Soviet Union
- Date of death: 13 January 1993 (aged 44)
- Place of death: Odesa, Ukraine
- Height: 1.79 m (5 ft 10 in)
- Position: Defender

Youth career
- 1966–1967: Moldova Kishinyov

Senior career*
Years	Team	Apps	(Gls)
1968–1969	SKA Odesa	63	(6)
1970–1978	FC Chornomorets Odesa	202	(4)
1979	SKA Odesa	33	(0)
1980–1981	FC Kolos Nikopol	47	(6)
1981	FC Dzerzhynets Ovidiopol		
1982–1983	FC Suvorovets Izmail		

Managerial career
- FC Suvorovets Izmail
- 1987–1988: Sports school Chornomorets Odesa
- 1989–1991: FC Chornomorets Odesa (ass't)
- 1992–1993: FC Chornomorets-2 Odesa
- * Club domestic league appearances and goals

Vitaliy Sidnyov (Ukrainian: Віталій Менделейович Фейдман (Сідньов); 10 September 1948 – 13 January 1993) is a former professional Soviet football defender and later Soviet and Ukrainian coach.
