= Andriy Kurayev =

Ukrainian professional footballer

Personal information
- Full name: Andriy Vadymovych Kurayev
- Date of birth: 19 December 1972 (age 53)
- Place of birth: Donetsk, Ukrainian SSR
- Height: 1.89 m (6 ft 2 1/2 in)
- Position: Goalkeeper

Youth career
- 198?–1990: Shakhtar Donetsk

Senior career*
Years	Team	Apps	(Gls)
1990–1994	Shakhtar Donetsk	9	(0)
1990–1991	→Antratsyt Kirovske (loan)	8	(0)
1994	→Metalurh Kostyantynivka	19	(0)
1994–1997	Nyva Ternopil	82	(0)
1997–1998	Metalurh Donetsk	6	(0)
1997–1998	→Metalurh-2 Donetsk	8	(0)
1998–1999	Shakhtar Donetsk	10	(0)
1998–1999	→Shakhtar-2 Donetsk	9	(0)
1999–2002	Metalurh Donetsk	50	(0)
2002	→Kuban Krasnodar (loan)	13	(0)
2002	Vorskla-Naftohaz Poltava	8	(0)
2003	Kryvbas Kryvyi Rih	0	(0)
2003–2004	Zorya Luhansk	33	(0)
2005	Olimpik Donetsk	5	(0)
2005	Kryvbas Kryvyi Rih	1	(0)

Managerial career
- 2008–2009: Shakhtar Donetsk (assistant)
- * Club domestic league appearances and goals

Andriy Kurayev (Ukrainian: Андрій Вадимович Кураєв; born 19 December 1972) is a retired Ukrainian professional footballer who played as a goalkeeper and current football manager.

== Career ==
Kurayev is a product of his native Donetsk's Shakhtar. His first trainer was Mykola Dehtyarev.

After spent his career in the different Ukrainian clubs, he played also a one season for the Russian FC Kuban side in 2002.

He retired from professional playing career in 2005.
