= Vasyl Mazur =

Ukrainian footballer and coach

Personal information
- Full name: Vasyl Mykolayovych Mazur
- Date of birth: 23 May 1970 (age 56)
- Place of birth: Hirnyk, Donetsk Oblast, Ukrainian SSR, Soviet Union (now Ukraine)
- Height: 1.83 m (6 ft 0 in)
- Position: Defender

Team information
- Current team: Krylia Sovetov Samara (U21 assistant)

Senior career*
Years	Team	Apps	(Gls)
1987–1992	Shakhtar Donetsk	33	(0)
1992–1994	Zorya-MALS Luhansk	60	(0)
1994–1996	Kryvbas Kryvyi Rih	51	(0)
1996–1998	Krylia Sovetov Samara	88	(1)
1999	Arsenal Tula	14	(1)
1999	Sokol Saratov	2	(0)
2000	Lokomotiv Nizhny Novgorod	10	(0)
2001	Metallurg Krasnoyarsk	17	(1)

Managerial career
- 2006: DFK Yunit Samara (director)
- 2015: Krylia Sovetov Samara (academy)
- 2015: Lada Togliatti (assistant)
- 2016–2018: Krylia Sovetov Samara (academy)
- 2018–: Krylia Sovetov Samara (U21 assistant)
- * Club domestic league appearances and goals

Vasyl Mykolayovych Mazur (Ukrainian: Василь Миколайович Мазур; born 23 May 1970) is a Ukrainian professional football coach and a former player. He is an assistant coach with the under-21 squad of Krylia Sovetov Samara.

== Personal life ==
He is the twin brother of another professional footballer Serhiy Mazur.

== Playing career ==
He made his professional debut in the Soviet Top League in 1990 for FC Shakhtar Donetsk.
