= Volodymyr Konovalchuk =

Ukrainian footballer

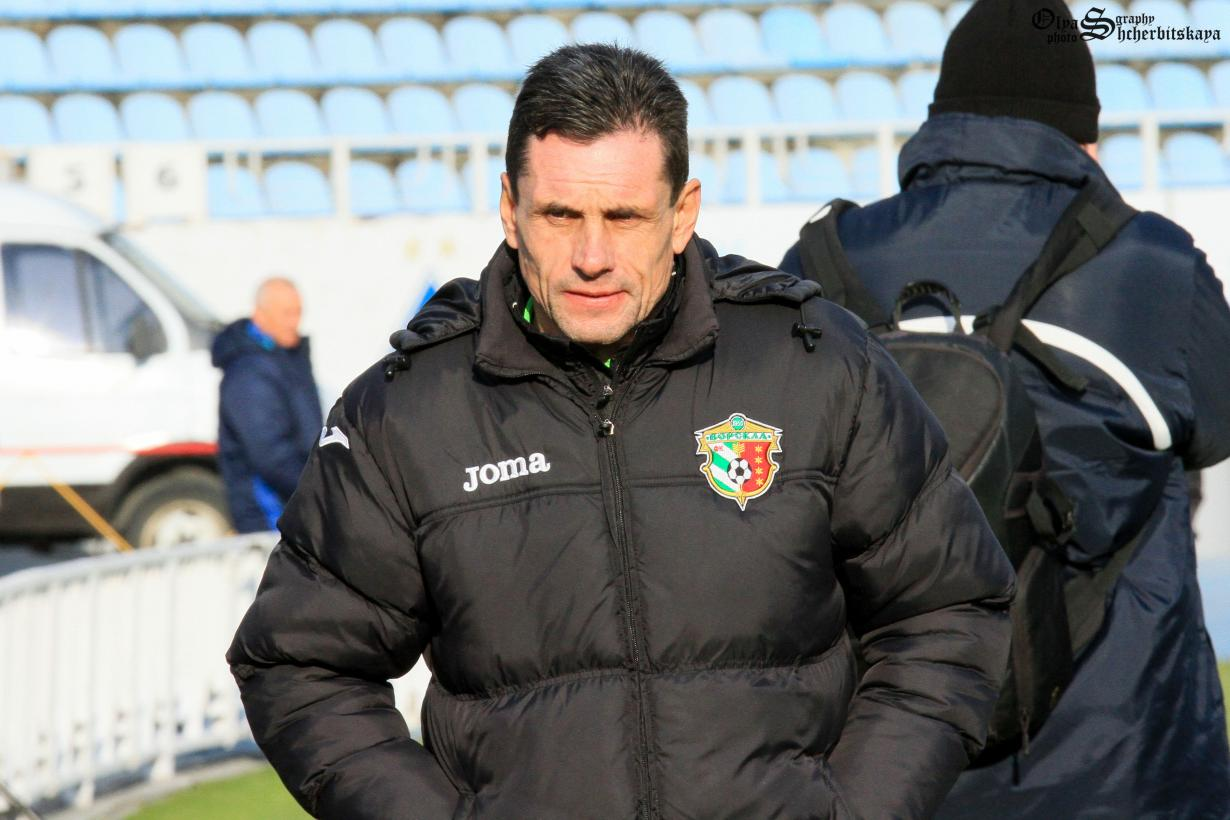

Personal information
- Full name: Volodymyr Dmytrovych Konovalchuk
- Date of birth: 23 November 1965 (age 60)
- Place of birth: Soviet Union
- Height: 1.77 m (5 ft 10 in)
- Position: Midfielder

Senior career*
Years	Team	Apps	(Gls)
1990	Shakhtar Donetsk	0	(0)
1990–1991	Kryvbas Kryvyi Rih	51	(3)
1992–1995	Kremin Kremenchuk	109	(7)
1995–1996	Vorskla Poltava	36	(0)
1996–1997	Kremin Kremenchuk	19	(2)
1997–1999	Metalurh Zaporizhya	41	(2)
1999–2000	Hirnyk-Sport Komsomolsk	27	(1)
2001	Adoms Kremenchuk	14	(0)
2001	Hirnyk-Sport Komsomolsk	3	(0)
2002	Kremez Kremenchuk	6	(0)
Total		306	(15)
- * Club domestic league appearances and goals

Volodymyr Dmytrovych Konovalchuk (Ukrainian: Володимир Дмитрович Коновальчук; born 23 November 1965) is a Ukrainian retired footballer who played as a midfielder.

== Career ==
Konovalchuk began playing football in the Soviet Top League for FC Shakhtar Donetsk. In 1992, he joined FC Kremin Kremenchuk for the first season of the Ukrainian Premier League.

== Career statistics ==
Club	Season	League		Cup		Total	
Club	Season	Apps	Goals	Apps	Goals	Apps	Goals
Shakhtar	1990	0	0	0	0	0	0
Shakhtar	Total	0	0	0	0	0	0
Kryvbas	1990	6	0	0	0	6	0
Kryvbas	1991	45	3	0	0	45	3
Kryvbas	Total	51	3	0	0	51	3
Kremin	1992	17	0	4	2	21	2
Kremin	1992–93	27	0	3	1	30	1
Kremin	1993–94	32	5	6	1	38	6
Kremin	1994–95	33	2	4	0	37	2
Kremin	Total	109	7	17	4	126	11
Vorskla	1995–96	32	1	1	0	33	1
Vorskla	1996–97	4	0	0	0	4	0
Vorskla	Total	36	1	1	0	37	1
Kremin	1996–97	19	2	2	0	21	2
Kremin	Total	19	2	2	0	21	2
Metalurh Z	1997–98	30	2	2	0	32	2
Metalurh Z	1998–99	11	0	2	0	13	0
Metalurh Z	Total	41	2	4	0	45	2
Hirnyk-Sport	1999–2000	14	2	4	1	18	3
Hirnyk-Sport	2000–01	13	1	1	0	14	1
Hirnyk-Sport	Total	27	3	5	1	32	4
Adoms	2000–01	14	0	0	0	14	0
Adoms	Total	14	0	0	0	14	0
Hirnyk-Sport	2001–02	3	0	0	0	3	0
Hirnyk-Sport	Total	3	0	0	0	3	0
Kremin-2	2002	6	0	0	0	6	0
Kremin-2	Total	6	0	0	0	6	0
Career	Total	306	18	29	5	335	23
