= Oleksandr Pryzetko =

Ukrainian footballer (born 1971)

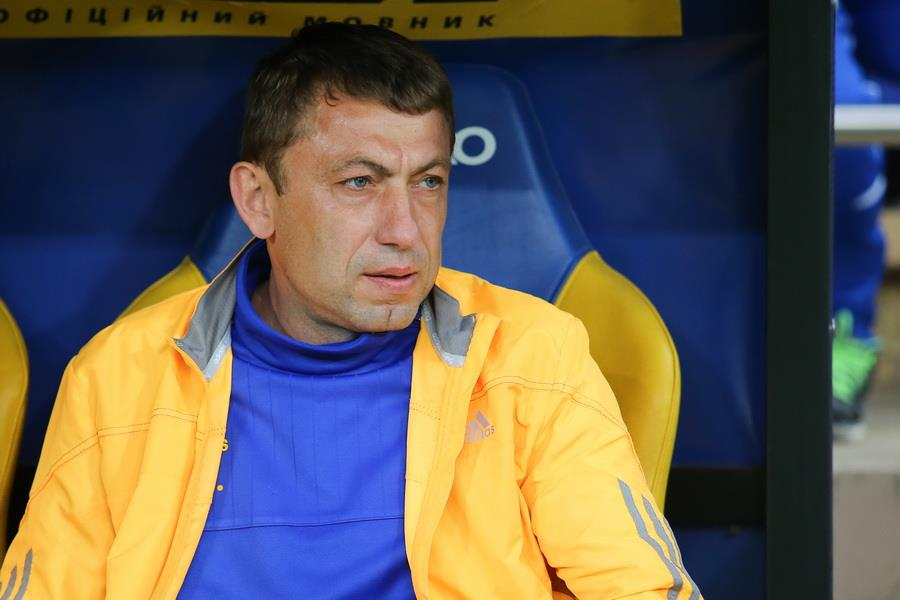

Personal information
- Full name: Oleksandr Serhiyovych Pryzetko
- Date of birth: 31 January 1971 (age 55)
- Place of birth: Izmail, Ukrainian SSR
- Height: 1.83 m (6 ft 0 in)
- Positions: Midfielder; striker

Senior career*
Years	Team	Apps	(Gls)
1988	Mayak Kharkiv	2	(0)
1988–1993	Metalist Kharkiv	76	(22)
1993–1995	Dynamo Kyiv	46	(8)
1995–1997	Tyumen	80	(26)
1997–1998	Torpedo Moscow	26	(1)
1999	Arsenal Tula	30	(3)
2000–2004	Chernomorets Novorossiysk	100	(24)
2004–2005	Metalist Kharkiv	12	(0)
Total		372	(84)

International career
1992–2001	Ukraine	5	(0)

Managerial career
- 2015–2016: Metalist Kharkiv (youth team)
- 2016: Metalist Kharkiv (caretaker)
- 2016–2017: Metalist 1925 Kharkiv
- 2017–2018: Polissya Zhytomyr
- 2020–2023: Metalist Kharkiv (assistant)
- 2025: Chornomorets Odesa (assistant)
- * Club domestic league appearances and goals

Oleksandr Serhiyovych Pryzetko (Ukrainian: Олександр Сергійович Призетко; born 31 January 1971) is a Ukrainian professional football manager and a former player.

== Career ==
Pryzetko made his professional debut in the Soviet Second League in 1988 for FC Mayak Kharkiv.

== Honours ==
- Ukrainian Premier League: 1994, 1995
- Russian Premier League Cup finalist: 2003
