= Yevhen Drahunov =

Ukrainian footballer

Personal information
- Full name: Yevhen Ivanovych Drahunov
- Date of birth: 13 February 1964
- Place of birth: Makiivka, Ukrainian SSR
- Date of death: 10 September 2001 (aged 37)
- Place of death: Makiivka, Ukraine
- Height: 1.86 m (6 ft 1 in)
- Positions: Defender; midfielder

Senior career*
Years	Team	Apps	(Gls)
1980–1981	FC Kholodna Balka Makiivka		
1981	FC Kirovets Makiivka		
1982	SKA Kyiv	0	(0)
1982–1983	FC Shakhtar Donetsk	0	(0)
1984	SKA Kyiv	16	(0)
1985	FC Kolos Pavlohrad	9	(2)
1985–1992	FC Shakhtar Donetsk	195	(15)
1993–1994	SC Tavriya Simferopol	29	(0)
1994	FC Lada Togliatti	9	(1)
1994	FC Kuban Krasnodar	2	(0)
1995	FC Shinnik Yaroslavl	30	(0)
1996	FC Lada Chernivtsi		
1996–1997	FC Rot-Weiß Erfurt	17	(2)
1997	Spandauer BC	17	(0)
1998–1999	Ludwigsfelder FC		
1999–2000	FC Zorya Luhansk	1	(0)

International career
1992	Ukraine	2	(0)
- * Club domestic league appearances and goals

Yevhen Ivanovych Drahunov (Ukrainian: Євген Іванович Драгунов; Russian: Евгений Иванович Драгунов; 13 February 1964 – 10 September 2001) was a Ukrainian professional football player.

== Club career ==
He made his professional debut in the Soviet Second League in 1984 for SKA Kyiv.

In 1983 Drahunov took part in the Summer Spartakiad of the Peoples of the USSR in the team of Ukrainian SSR.

== Death ==
In 2001 Drahunov died from a stroke.

== Honours ==
- Soviet Cup finalist: 1986.
