= Yuriy Fokin =

Ukrainian football player (born 1966)

Personal information
- Full name: Yuriy Tenhisovych Fokin
- Date of birth: 3 January 1966 (age 60)
- Place of birth: Donetsk, Soviet Union (now Ukraine)
- Height: 1.68 m (5 ft 6 in)
- Positions: Midfielder; defender

Senior career*
Years	Team	Apps	(Gls)
1986–1987	SKA Kyiv	61	(2)
1988	FC Naftovyk Okhtyrka	48	(5)
1989	FC Nyva Vinnytsia	34	(1)
1989–1991	SC Tavriya Simferopol	90	(2)
1992–1993	FC Shakhtar Donetsk	42	(3)
1993	→ FC Metalurh Kostyantynivka (loan)	18	(1)
1994–1996	FC Naftokhimik Kremenchuk	70	(13)
1995	SC Tavriya Simferopol	12	(0)
1996	FC Shakhtar Makiivka	5	(0)
1996–1998	FC Nyva Ternopil	62	(4)
1999	FC Metalurh Donetsk	12	(0)
1999	Prykarpattia Ivano-Frankivsk	14	(0)
1999	→ Prykarpattia-2 Ivano-Frankivsk (loan)	1	(0)
2000	FC Shakhta Ukraina Ukrayinsk	6	(0)
2000–2002	SC Tavriya Simferopol	30	(1)
2005	FC Feniks-Illichovets Kalinine	9	(0)

Managerial career
- 2005: Tavriya-92 (youth)
- * Club domestic league appearances and goals

Yuriy Fokin (Ukrainian: Юрій Тенгісович Фокін) is a former Soviet and Ukrainian midfielder. He is a Ukrainian coach with Tavriya football academy.

On May 19, 2008 Fokin was awarded with the Honorary Diploma of Crimea Supreme Council for being a member of Tavriya Simferopol and winning the 1992 Ukrainian championship. Fokin however in the 1992 Ukrainian Premier League played for Shakhtar Donetsk and played in both Shakhtar's games against Tavriya that season earning in one of them a yellow card.

Upon retiring in 2005, Fokin became a coach in the Tavriya Simferopol football academy.
