= Vadym Shevchenko =

Soviet footballer (1956–2023)

Personal information
- Date of birth: 12 August 1956
- Place of birth: Baku, Azerbaijani SSR, Soviet Union
- Date of death: 18 April 2023 (aged 66)
- Position: Goalkeeper

Senior career*
Years	Team	Apps	(Gls)
1978	Kryvbas Kryvyi Rih	17	(0)
1980–1981	Avanhard Rivne	64	(0)
1981	SKA Kyiv	16	(0)
1982–1983	Pakhtakor Tashkent	0	(0)
1983	Nyva Bereshany	16	(0)
Refereeing career
Domestic
Years	League	Role
1991	Soviet Top League	Referee
1992–2003	Ukrainian Premier League	Referee
International
Years	League	Role
1993	FIFA listed	Referee
- * Club domestic league appearances and goals

Vadym Shevchenko (Ukrainian: Вадим Шевченко; 12 August 1956 – 18 April 2023) was a footballer from the former Soviet Union who played for Avanhard Rivne and Kryvbas Kryvyi Rih. After retiring as a player, Shevchenko became a football referee.

Shevchenko was a referee at the 1994 FIFA World Cup qualification match between Faroes and Romania that took place on 8 September 1993 in Toftir, Faroes.

== Personal life ==
Vadym has a brother, Vitaly Shevchenko, who was also a footballer and a football manager.
