= Serhiy Pohodin =

Ukrainian footballer

Serhiy Pohodin Сергій Погодін
Personal information
- Full name: Serhiy Anatoliyovych Pohodin
- Date of birth: 29 April 1968 (age 58)
- Place of birth: Rubizhne, Ukrainian SSR
- Height: 1.83 m (6 ft 0 in)
- Positions: Midfielder; striker

Senior career*
Years	Team	Apps	(Gls)
1985–1986	FC Zarya Voroshilovgrad	44	(2)
1987–1989	FC Dynamo Kyiv	3	(0)
1990	FC Zorya Luhansk	17	(4)
1990–1993	FC Shakhtar Donetsk	62	(10)
1993	Roda JC	3	(0)
1993–1994	FC Spartak Moscow	3	(0)
1994–1995	FC Shakhtar Donetsk	19	(3)
1995	CP Mérida	3	(0)
1995–1997	Hapoel Tel Aviv F.C.	37	(5)
1998–2000	FC Torpedo Zaporizhia	14	(0)
2000–2002	FC Zorya Luhansk	16	(1)
2007–2008	FC Tytan Donetsk	37	(7)

International career
1988	Soviet U-21	1	(0)
1992	Ukraine	1	(0)

Managerial career
- 2001–2002: FC Zorya Luhansk
- 2006–2009: FC Tytan Donetsk (player-assistant coach)
- 2009: FC Tytan Donetsk
- * Club domestic league appearances and goals

Serhiy Anatoliyovych Pohodin (Ukrainian: Сергій Анатолійович Погодін; Russian: Серге́й Анатольевич Погодин; born 29 April 1968) is a Ukrainian professional football coach and a former player.

== Club career ==
He made his debut in the Soviet Second League in 1985 for FC Zarya Voroshilovgrad. He played one game and scored one goal in the 1993–94 UEFA Champions League qualification for FC Spartak Moscow against Skonto FC.

== International ==
Invited to play for the CIS national football team, the FFU vice-president Yevhen Kotelnykov insisted that Pohodin should participate in the debut game of the Ukraine national football team.

== Honours ==
- Soviet Top League runner-up: 1988.
- Soviet Cup winner: 1990.
- Russian Premier League champion: 1993, 1994.
