= Rakoshyno =

- Village
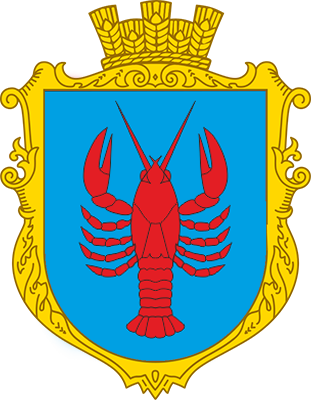
- Coat of arms

- Location within Ukraine Location within Zakarpattia Oblast
- Coordinates: 48°27′51″N 22°35′51″E
- Country: Ukraine
- Oblast: Zakarpattia Oblast
- District: Mukachevo Raion

Area
  - Total: 4,219 km^{2} (1,629 sq mi)

Rakoshyno (Ukrainian: Ракошино, Hungarian: Beregrákos) is a village located in the Mukacheve Raion (district) in the Zakarpattia Oblast (province) in western Ukraine. Rakoshino is located 7 kilometers from Mukachevo.

It has a population of 3,280. 51.90% of which spoke Rusyn according to the 2001 Census.

== History ==
History of Rakoshyno Translated from the Ukrainian. According to legend, the name of the village Rakosh (Rakove) comes from the word "crayfish", many of which were found in the old bed of the river Latorytsia, which ran through the village. In some written sources, the village is also called Beregrakosh (ie Rakoshin Berezky), because it belonged to the Berezka County. The area where the villages of Rakoshinskaya village council are located has been inhabited since ancient times. Stone tools of the Neolithic era (4th–3rd centuries BC) were found in the area of Kaidanov and the vicinity of Rakoshin. In written sources the village is mentioned in 1330.

In written sources the village is mentioned in 1332 as Rakus.

As early as 1427, the inhabitants of Rakoshin and other villages fought against the transfer of their lands to Brankovych. In 1463, he and the peasants of Ianoshiev (Ivanivka) protested against the attacks and violence of the Irshava feudal lord Ladislav Karachoni. In 1514 they took part in the peasant war. Authorities sent regular troops to suppress the protests. Authorities built barracks to house parts of the castle cavalry in the village.

The village had a church in the Middle Ages, which was already in ruins in 1737. In 1645 there was the Rakoczi estate, which was destroyed by the Poles in 1657. The Reformed Church was built in the neoclassical style between 1836 and 1844 and was restored in 1981.

In the 17th century, the village was owned by the Semigrad princes, in particular the Rakoci family. Changes in the owners of the village, their quarrels led to increased enslavement of peasants, which delayed the development of the village. During the war, men were drafted into the army. The serfs were obliged to pay numerous monetary and in-kind duties. In addition to numerous dues, the peasants performed various works on construction and repair in the manor or in Mukachevo Castle, carried security, transported various things and so on.

During the invasion of Transcarpathia by the Polish - noble army in 1657, the estate of the Rakoci in Rakoshin was destroyed. However, the rulers forced the peasants to quickly rebuild it, and in 1684 it was completely reconstructed. In addition to feudal exploitation, the peasants suffered religious and national oppression. The Greek Catholic religion was forcibly imposed on the Ukrainian population, which recognized Orthodoxy; the Hungarian population suffered from the Catholic Church and converted to Protestantism.

After the conquest of Transcarpathia by the Austrian Habsburgs, the situation of the masses worsened. The serfs still barely survived, suffered from shortages, and were also robbed by stationed German troops. This, first of all, explains the active participation of many peasants of Rakoshin in the liberation war of the Hungarian people in 1703-1711. There were more than 40 people of Rakoshin and neighboring villages in the detachments of chickens. After 1728, Rakoshino, like the entire Mukachevo-Chinadiyev dominion, passed into the hands of Count Schönborn.

In the 19th century, according to T. Lehotsky and J. Sternberg, the community of Rakoshin (village of Mukachevo district of Berezka County) used a seal with the image of cancer (which reproduced one of the legends about the origin of the name of the village).

On March 22, 1919, the period of Soviet occupation began in the village. However, the Bolshevik occupation lasted 39 days. On April 29, 1919, Rakoshino was occupied by Romanian troops. And in May they were replaced by Czechoslovak troops.

During the years from the First to the Second World Wars, Rakoshino has hardly changed. Most of the houses were wooden, and the streets were untidy.

On March 15, 1939, the village was occupied by the Nazis. Dark days began for the people of Rakoshyn. Gendarmes were stationed in the village. National oppression intensified. The Ukrainian language was expelled from school, and it was forbidden even to speak it in government institutions. Terror, torture and persecution forced many young men and women to flee to the Soviet Union. In 1940, 29 people illegally moved from Rakoshyn to the USSR. Rakoshintsy refused to fight against the Soviet Union.

On October 26, 1944, the troops of the 4th Ukrainian Front liberated Rakoshino. Many of Rakoshin's youth joined the Red Army and took part in the final defeat of the Nazis. M.Doktor, V.Krupka, I.Kogutych, Y.Glagola and others from Rakoshyn went to Berlin with battles.

On November 17, 1944, the villagers called for the reunification of Transcarpathia with Soviet Ukraine. Their elected representatives Dmytro Kovach and Petro Varha voted for the reunification of Transcarpathia with the USSR at the First Congress of the People's Committees of Transcarpathian Ukraine.

== Religion ==
Church of St. arch. Michael. 1833

In the 17th century. the majority of the population were Protestants. In 1682 the church received a plot allocated by the landlord. In 1733 the wooden church of St. Michael. In 1798 there is a mention of an old wooden church in poor condition.

In 1833 a new plot of land for the construction of a church was donated from the count's lands, and building materials were also provided. In 1834 an additional plot of land was provided for the parish near the newly built church.

In 1839, the houses of the deacon and the priest were exchanged, as a result of which the lighthouse was in its present place. In 1937, a stone cross was erected on the site where the old church (or churches) stood from 1576 to 1833. The stone church is a typical for the neighborhood one-nave basilica, built after Fr. Mykola Bachynsky. At the end of the 19th century. Mykola Golovchak painted the interior. The wooden chandelier was made by Vasyl Lendel and Yuriy Logoyda.

In 1996, Myron Kurtseba from Rusky repainted frescoes and icons. The bell tower was built of metal and concrete in 1935, when the church was renovated by the efforts of the parish priest Mykola Tovt. Three bells were cast by the Uzhhorod firm "Akord" in 1933 for the 100th anniversary of the church. The bells were consecrated by Bishop O. Stoyka on the feast of St. St. Michael's 1935. Several wooden crosses have been destroyed near the church.

== Born in the village ==
Bela Salamon, Bela Sali (Rakoshino, March 4, 1885 - Budapest, June 15, 1965) was a Hungarian actor, theater director, humorist, and writer.

== Immigration ==
Many immigrants to the US from Rakoshyno/Beregrákos in the late 19th and early 20th centuries were destined for Pennsylvania and New Jersey. The name was often corrupted to B. Rokos, B. Rakos, Bereg Rakos, Beregkakos, Braltas, Ungdaroc and Ungdarocz.
