= Yuriy Mokrytskyi =

Ukrainian footballer (born 1970)

Yuriy Mokrytskyi Юрій Мокрицький
Personal information
- Full name: Yuriy Yaroslavovych Mokrytskyi
- Date of birth: 16 October 1970 (age 56)
- Place of birth: Rava-Ruska, Ukrainian SSR
- Height: 1.83 m (6 ft 0 in)
- Positions: Defender; midfielder

Youth career
- DYuSSh-4 Lviv

Senior career*
Years	Team	Apps	(Gls)
1988–1989	FC SKA Karpaty Lviv	50	(0)
1990	FC Halychyna Drohobych	34	(0)
1991–1994	Karpaty Lviv	117	(8)
1994–1995	Maccabi Ironi Ashdod	28	(0)
1995–1997	Karpaty Lviv	45	(1)
1997–1998	Zhemchuzhina-Sochi	14	(0)
1997	→ Zhemchuzhina-2 Sochi	2	(1)
1998	Vorskla Poltava	21	(0)
1998	→ Vorskla-2 Poltava	6	(0)
1999	FC Prykarpattya Ivano-Frankivsk	2	(0)
1999–2003	FC Oleksandriya	103	(0)
2003–2004	Nyva Vinnytsia	34	(0)
2004	FC Sudova Vyshnia		
2004	FC Oleksandriya	6	(0)
2005	FC Tekhno-Center Rohatyn	6	(0)
2005–2006	FC Dnipro Cherkasy	8	(0)
Medal record
Men's football
Representing Soviet Union
FIFA U-16 World Championship
Winner	1987 Canada
UEFA European Under-17 Championship
Runner-up	1987 France
- * Club domestic league appearances and goals

Yuriy Yaroslavovych Mokrytskyi (Ukrainian: Юрій Ярославович Мокрицький; born 16 October 1970) is a Ukrainian former football player.

== Honours ==
Soviet Union U17

- FIFA U-17 World Cup: 1987
- UEFA European Under-16 Championship runner-up: 1987

Karpaty Lviv

- Ukrainian Cup finalist: 1993
