= JSC ZAZ Stadium =

Multi-use stadium in Zaporizhzhia, Ukraine

- Stadion Avto ZAZ
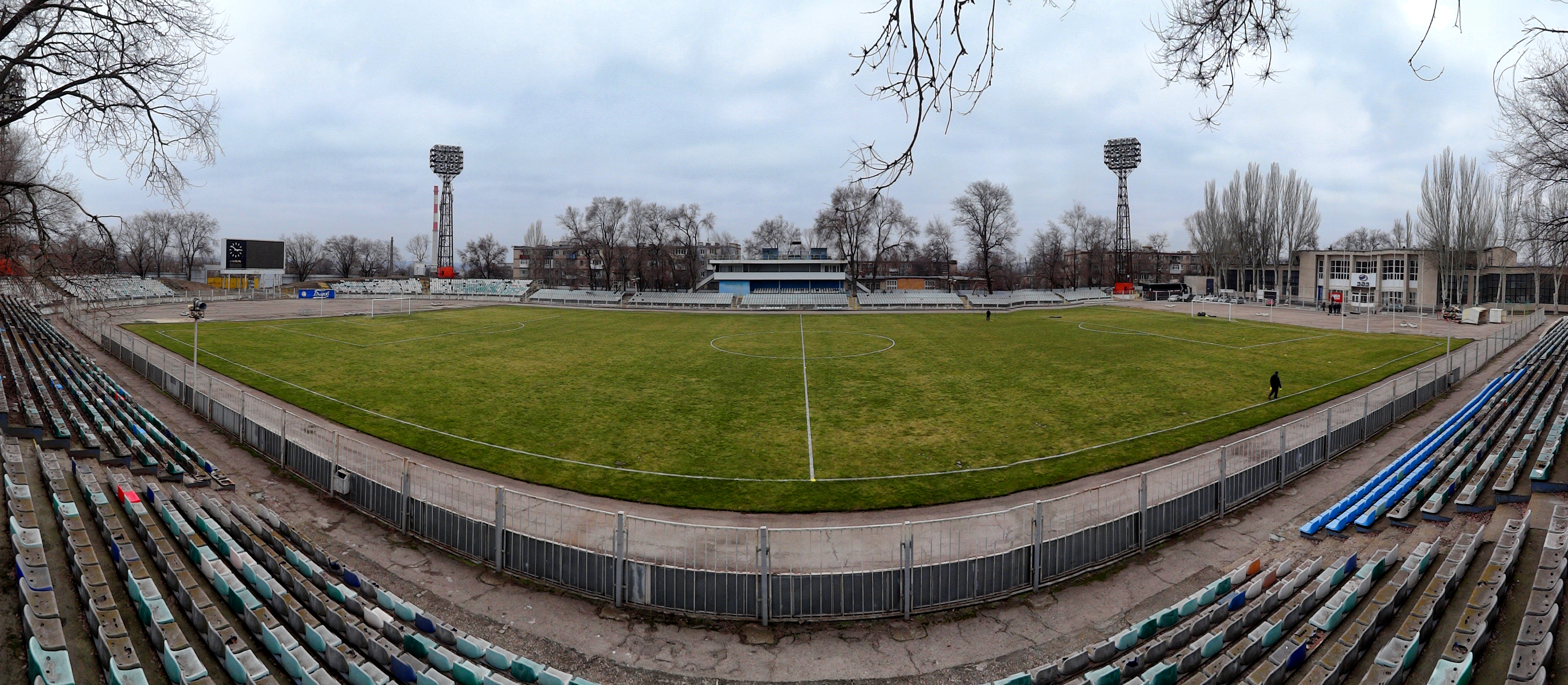
- Interactive map of JSC ZAZ Stadium
- Former names: Komunar
- Location: Zaporizhzhia, Ukraine
- Coordinates: 47°48′4.54″N 35°11′35.98″E
- Owner: ZAZ, Zaporizhzhia
- Capacity: 7,233 (football)
- Surface: Grass
- Field size: ?

Construction
- Opened: 1980s

Tenants
- FC Torpedo Zaporizhzhia (1982-2001); FC Metalurh Zaporizhya (2001-2006)

JSC ZAZ Stadium is a multi-use stadium in Zaporizhzhia, Ukraine that belongs to the Zaporizhzhia car-manufacturing plant (ZAZ). The stadium's capacity is 7,233 people.

The stadium is located right next to the factory, just across a railroad. It is located in the southern part of the city and urban residential area. Near the stadium flows a small river Mokra-Moskovka which is a left tributary of Dnieper. Near the stadium is located a train station Zaporizhzhia-1, while the stadium itself is about mile away down the Kosmichna vulytsia (local street) from the main highway M18/E105.

Originally, the stadium was home to the factory team FC Torpedo Zaporizhzhia that existed from 1982 to 2001.

From 2001 to 2006, the stadium was the home of FC Metalurh Zaporizhya, as the Ukrainian Top League had banned Metalurh's home stadium from hosting games in 2001 due to safety concerns. In July 2006, the team returned to its renovated Slavutych Arena.

On 7 May 2002, during a Ukrainian Top League game between Metalurh and Dynamo Kyiv, Dynamo manager Valeriy Lobanovskyi collapsed after suffering a massive stroke, from which he died five days later in one of the Zaporizhzhia city clinics.

On 18 October 2023, a Russian artillery strike hit and partially damaged the playing pitch of the stadium.
