= FC Druzhba Berdiansk =

FC Druzhba Berdiansk (Ukrainian: ФК Дружба Бердянськ) was a football club from Berdiansk, Zaporizhia Oblast, Ukraine.

== History ==
Before 1990s, Berdiansk was represented by FC Torpedo Berdiansk which disappeared following 1991.

FC Druzhba Osypenko was created in 1990 at the Druzhba collective farm (kolkhoz) in a village of Osypenko, Berdiansk Raion. In 1991 it was a runner-up in the Zaporizhia Oblast Football Championship. In 1992 and 1992–93, it participated in the Ukrainian professional competitions of lower leagues. In 1993, the club moved to Berdiansk. After 1993, Druzhba withdrew from competitions and was dissolved.

In 2006, another club was created by the Illich Steel and Iron Works out of Mariupol, Illich-Agro and was called as FC Illich-Osypenko. In 2007, 2008 and 2009, the team became champions of the Zaporizhia Oblast Football Championship.
