= Serhiy Laktionov =

Ukrainian footballer and coach

Personal information
- Full name: Serhiy Volodymyrovych Laktionov
- Date of birth: 3 October 1967 (age 59)
- Place of birth: Novovolodymyrivka, Hola Prystan Raion, Kherson Oblast, Ukrainian SSR
- Height: 1.74 m (5 ft 9 in)
- Position: Midfielder

Team information
- Current team: Oleksandriya (assistant manager)

Youth career
- 1982–1984: RSSI Kyiv

Senior career*
Years	Team	Apps	(Gls)
1984–1985	Zirka Kirovohrad	35	(4)
1987	Sula Lubny	?	(?)
1987	SKA Kyiv	13	(1)
1988–1989	Zirka Kirovohrad	60	(9)
1989	Zaria Bălți	17	(0)
1990–1992	Kremin Kremenchuk	104	(10)
1993–1996	Polihraftekhnika Oleksandriya	129	(16)
1996–1998	Neftekhimik Nizhnekamsk	98	(7)
1999	Polihraftekhnika Oleksandriya	28	(3)
2000	Borysfen Boryspil	12	(0)
2000–2001	Zirka Kirovohrad	30	(0)
2002	Nyva Ternopil	5	(1)
2003	Yevropa Pryluky	7	(0)

Managerial career
- 2009–2010: Zorya Haivoron
- 2010–2014: UkrAhroKom Holovkivka (assistant)
- 2014–2021: Oleksandriya (U19 assistant)
- 2021–2022: Oleksandriya (assistant)
- 2024–2025: Sambir-Nyva-2 Ternopil
- 2025–2026: Oleksandriya-2 (assistant)
- 2026–: Oleksandriya (assistant)
- * Club domestic league appearances and goals

Serhiy Laktionov (Ukrainian: Сергій Володимирович Лактіонов; born 3 October 1967) is a Ukrainian retired professional footballer who played as a midfielder player and currently working as an assistant manager at Oleksandriya.

== Career ==
Born in Hola Prystan Raion, Laktionov is a product of the Piddubny Olympic College in Kyiv.

His football career also included other Ukrainian clubs from different leagues (including Vyshcha Liha). He also spent two years as legionnaire in Russia.

After retirement from playing career, he worked as a football trainer in amateur football team Zorya from Haivoron and currently is an assistant manager since 2010.
