= 1993–94 Ukrainian Cup =

1993–94 Ukrainian Football Cup
Кубок України з футболу

Tournament details
- Country: Ukraine
- Dates: 1 August 1993 – 29 May 1994
- Teams: 80

Final positions
- Champions: Chornomorets Odesa (2nd title)
- Runners-up: Tavriya Simferopol

Tournament statistics
- Top goal scorer(s): Oleksiy Antiukhin; Eduard Valenko (5 each)

The 1993–94 Ukrainian Cup was the third annual edition of Ukraine's football knockout competition, known as the Ukrainian Cup.

The Cup started with the round of 32, but it also had couple of preliminaries. The tournament started on August 1, 1993, with numerous games across the country and concluded with its final game on May 29, 1994. The last season defending champion FC Dynamo Kyiv was eliminated in the Round of 16 by FC Veres Rivne on the away goal rule. This season cup holders became FC Chornomorets Odesa that in the final defeated the Crimean SC Tavriya Simferopol on the penalty shootout.

Kryvbas Kryvyi Rih served its suspension for refusing to play last season and was not included in competition for the season.

== Team allocation ==
- Eighty teams entered the competition.
- 3 professional clubs did not enter (Second League: Hazovyk Komarne, Medita Shakhtarsk; Top League: Kryvbas Kryvyi Rih)
- 14 out of 18 teams of the Transitional League did not enter
- 7 regions did not provide their representatives (AR Crimea, Chernihiv, Kyiv, Kyiv City, Kirovohrad, Rivne, Zaporizhzhia)

=== Distribution ===
	Teams entering in this round	Teams advancing from previous round
1st Qualifying round (64 teams)	19 winners of regional cup competitions (selected); 4 participants of the Third League (selected); 20 participants of the Second League; 20 participants of the First League; 1 participants of the Higher League (Veres Rivne)	
2nd Qualifying round (32 teams)		32 winners from the first qualifying round
Tournament proper (32 teams)	16 participants of the Higher League	16 winners from the third qualifying round

=== First qualifying round entrants ===
- 19 regional representatives
- 4 Third League (Dynamo Saky, FC Lviv, Nyva Karapyshi, Torpedo Melitopol)
- 20 Second League in whole (Azovets Mariupol, Bazhanovets Makiivka, Chaika Sevastopol, Chornomorets-2 Odesa, Dnister Zalishchyky, Druzhba Berdiansk, Dynamo Luhansk, Halychyna Drohobych, Meliorator Kakhovka, Metalurh Kostiantynivka, Naftokhimik Kremenchuk, Nyva-Borysfen Boryspil, Ros Bila Tserkva, Shakhtar Pavlohrad, Tavria Kherson, Tytan Armiansk, Vahonobudivnyk Stakhanov, Voikovets Kerch, Yavir Krasnopillia, Zirka Kirovohrad)
- 20 First League in whole (Artania Ochakiv, Avtomobilist Sumy, Desna Chernihiv, Dnipro Cherkasy, Dynamo-2 Kyiv, Evis Mykolaiv, Khimik Severodonetsk, Khimik Zhytomyr, Krystal Chortkiv, Metalurh Nikopol, Naftovyk Okhtyrka, SC Odesa, Podillia Khmelnytskyi, Polihraftekhnika Oleksandria, Prykarpattia Ivano-Frankivsk, Pryladyst Mukacheve, Skala Stryi, Stal Alchevsk, Vorskla Poltava, Zakarpattia Uzhhorod)
- 1 Top League (Veres Rivne) – last season a wooden spoon candidated

== Competition schedule ==
=== First preliminary round ===
Almost all games were played on August 1, 1993. The game between Polihraftekhnika and Shakhtar took place on August 3.

Bazhanovets (Makiivka) (2L)	2:3	(1L) Stal (Alchevsk)
Dynamo (Luhansk) (2L)	2:1	(2L) Vahonobudivnyk (Stakhanov)
Hirnyk (Khartsyzk) (Am)	1:4	(2L) Metalurh (Kostiantynivka)
Avanhard (Rovenky) (Am)	2:0	(1L) Khimik (Severodonetsk)
Dynamo (Vysokopillya) (Am)	0:3	(2L) Zirka (Kirovohrad)
Polihraftekhnika (Olexandria) (1L)	3:0	(2L) Shakhtar (Pavlohrad)
Metalurh (Novomoskovsk) (Am)	1:2	(1L) Vorskla (Poltava)
Avanhard (Lozova) (Am)	0:2	(1L) Avtomobilist (Sumy)
Blaho (Blahoyeve) (Am)	0:5	(1L) EVIS (Mykolaiv)
Evis-2 (Mykolaiv) (Am)	2:3	(1L) Sport Club(Odesa)
Torpedo (Melitopol) (3L)	1:2	(1L) Metalurh (Nikopol)
Druzhba (Berdiansk) (2L)	+:-	(2L) Azovets (Mariupol)	Azovets (Mariupol) didn't submit documents
Meliorator (Kakhovka) (2L)	1:0	(2L) Tavria (Kherson)
Artania (Ochakiv) (1L)	2:0	(2L) Chornomorets-2 (Odesa)
Tytan (Armyansk) (2L)	1:3	(2L) Voykovets (Kerch)	aet
Dynamo (Saky) (3L)	1:1	(2L) Chaika (Sevastopol)	aet, pk 5:4
Nyva (Terebovlia) (Am)	1:2	(1L) Podillya (Khmelnytskyi)
Khimik (Velykyi Bychkiv) (Am)	0:5	(1L) Prykarpattia (Ivano-Frankivsk)
Khimik (Sokal) (Am)	1:3	(1L) Skala (Stryi)
Pryladyst (Mukacheve) (1L)	2:0	(1L) Zakarpattia (Uzhhorod)
FC Lviv (3L)	2:1	(2L) Halychyna (Drohobych)	aet
Karpaty (Chernivtsi) (Am)	4:1	(Am) Intehral (Vinnytsia)
Pokuttia (Kolomyia) (Am)	4:1	(2L) Dnister (Zalischyky)
Advis (Khmelnytskyi) (Am)	3:1	(1L) Krystal (Chortkiv)
Khimik (Cherkasy) (Am)	1:4	(2L) Naftokhimik (Kremenchuk)
Yavir (Krasnopilya) (2L)	1:2	(1L) Naftovyk (Okhtyrka)
Spartak (Okhtyrka) (Am)	0:2	(1L) Desna (Chernihiv)
Sula (Lubny) (Am)	2:2	(1L) Dynamo-2 (Kyiv)	aet, pk 5:4
Krok (Zhytomyr) (Am)	0:0	(2L) Ros (Bila Tserkva)	aet, pk 4:1
Pidshybnyk (Lutsk) (Am)	1:3	(PL) Veres (Rivne)
Nyva-Borysfen (Boryspil) (2L)	1:0	(1L) Khimik (Zhytomyr)
Nyva (Karapyshi) (3L)	3:1	(1L) Dnipro (Cherkasy)

=== Second preliminary round ===
Almost all games were played on August 7, 1993. The game between Veres and Krok took place on August 11.

Stal (Alchevsk) (1L)	6:3	(2L) Dynamo (Luhansk)
Metalurh (Konstantynivka) (2L)	5:3	(Am) Avanhard (Rovenky)
Zirka (Kirovohrad) (2L)	1:2	(1L) Polihraftekhnika (Olexandria)
Vorskla (Poltava) (1L)	2:0	(1L) Avtomobilist (Sumy)
EVIS (Mykolaiv) (1L)	3:1	(1L) Sport Club(Odesa)
Metalurh (Nikopol) (1L)	2:1	(2L) Druzhba (Berdiansk)
Meliorator (Kakhovka) (2L)	-:+	(1L) Artania (Ochakiv)	The game was won by Kakhovka 2:1, but they fielded disqualified player
Voykovets (Kerch) (2L)	1:0	(3L) Frunzenets (Saky)
Podillya (Khmelnytskyi) (1L)	1:2	(1L) Prykarpattia (Ivano-Frankivsk)
Skala (Stryi) (1L)	2:0	(1L) Pryladyst (Mukacheve)
FC Lviv (3L)	+:-	(Am) Karpaty (Chernivtsi)	Karpaty did not arrived
Pokuttia (Kolomyia) (Am)	2:1	(Am) Advis (Khmelnytskyi)
Naftokhimik (Kremenchuk) (2L)	0:0	(1L) Naftovyk (Okhtyrka)	aet, pk 5:3
Desna (Chernihiv) (1L)	5:1	(Am) Sula (Lubny)
Veres (Rivne) (PL)	4:1	(Am) Krok (Zhytomyr)
Football Club(Boryspil) (2L)	3:0	(3L) Nyva (Karapyshi)

=== Bracket ===
Round of 32
Voykovets Kerch	0	0	0
Chornomorets	2	2	4
Artania Ochakiv	0	0	0
Metalurh Zaporizhia	4	3	7
Evis Mykolaiv	1	0	1
Nyva Vinnytsia	2	0	2
Metalurh Nikopol	1	0	1
Dnipro	3	4	7
Vorskla Poltava	0	0	0
Karpaty Lviv	0	3	3
Polihraftekhnika	2	0	2
Zoria-MALS(p)	0	2	2
Metalurh K.	3	0	3
Bukovyna(a)	1	2	3
Stal Alchevsk	2	0	2
Volyn Lutsk(a)	1	1	2
Desna Chernihiv	1	2	3
Torpedo Zaporizhia	0	4	4
Naftokhimik	1	0	1
Temp Shepetivka	0	3	3
Nyva-Borysfen	1	0	1
Dynamo Kyiv	3	4	7
Veres Rivne	3	0	3
Metalist Kharkiv	0	1	1
Lviv	2	1	3
Kremin Kremenchuk	0	6	6
Pokuttia Kolomyia	0	1	1
Shakhtar Donetsk	1	7	8
Prykarpattia	1	1	2
Nyva Ternopil	1	4	5
Skala Stryi	2	1	3
Tavria Simferopol(aet)	0	5	5

Round of 16
Metalurh Zaporizhya	0	0	0
Chornomorets	1	3	4
Nyva Vinnytsia	2	1	3
Dnipro	0	4	4
Zorya-MALS	2	1	3
Karpaty Lviv	2	6	8
Volyn Lutsk	2	1	3
Bukovyna Chernivtsi	0	2	2
Temp Shepetivka	2	0	2
Torpedo Zaporizhia	1	2	3
Veres Rivne(a)	0	1	1
Dynamo Kyiv	0	1	1
Kremin Kremenchuk	2	1	3
Shakhtar Donetsk	1	1	2
Nyva Ternopil	0	0	0
Tavriya Simferopol	0	3	3

Quarter-finals
Dnipro	0	0	0
Chornomorets	3	1	4
Volyn Lutsk	2	0	2
Karpaty Lviv	1	2	3
Torpedo Zaporizhia	2	0	2
Veres Rivne(a)	1	1	2
Tavriya Simferopol	0	1	1
Kremin Kremenchuk	1	2	3

Semi-finals
Karpaty Lviv	0	1	1
Chornomorets	0	2	2
Tavriya Simferopol	2	0	2
Veres Rivne	0	0	0

Final
Chornomorets	0
Tavriya Simferopol	0

=== First Elimination Round ===
Team 1	Agg.	Team 2	1st leg	2nd leg
FC Pokuttia Kolomyia	1–8	FC Shakhtar Donetsk	0–1	1–7
FC Voikovets Kerch	0–4	FC Chornomorets Odesa	0–2	0–2
FC Stal Alchevsk	2–2 (a)	FC Volyn Lutsk	2–1	0–1
FC Metalurh Kostiantynivka	3–3 (a)	FC Bukovyna Chernivtsi	3–1	0–2
FC Polihraftekhnika Oleksandriya	2–2 (1–4 p)	FC Zorya Luhansk	2–0	0–2 (a.e.t.)
FC Vorskla Poltava	0–3	FC Karpaty Lviv	0–0	0–3
FC Evis Mykolaiv	1–2	FC Nyva Vinnytsia	1–2	0–0
FC Artania Ochakiv	0–7	FC Metalurh Zaporizhia	0–4	0–3
FC Prykarpattia Ivano-Frankivsk	2–5	FC Nyva Ternopil	1–1	1–4
FC Skala Stryi	3–5	SC Tavriya Simferopol	2–0	1–5 (a.e.t.)
FC Lviv	3–6	FC Kremin Kremenchuk	2–0	1–6
FC Naftokhimik Kremenchuk	1–3	FC Temp Shepetivka	1–0	0–3
FC Desna Chernihiv	3–4	FC Torpedo Zaporizhia	1–0	2–4
FC Veres Rivne	3–1	FC Metalist Kharkiv	3–0	0–1
FC Boryspil	1–7	FC Dynamo Kyiv	1–3	0–4
FC Metalurh Nikopol	1–7	FC Dnipro Dnipropetrovsk	1–3	0–4

==== First leg ====
15 October 1993
?:?

Pokuttya Kolomyia (AM)	0–1	(PL) Shakhtar Donetsk
	Report	Orbu 78'

Yunist Stadium, Kolomyia
Attendance: 10,000
Referee: Vadym Shelmenko (Kyiv)

20 October 1993
?:?

Voikovets Kerch (2L)	0–2	(PL) Chornomorets Odesa
	Report	Parakhnevych 18'; Yeremeyev 55'

50-Ann.of October Stadium, Kerch
Attendance: 4,000
Referee: Yevhen Yesin (Dnipropetrovsk)

20 October 1993
?:?

Stal Alchevsk (1L)	2–1	(PL) Volyn Lutsk
Hnezdilov 51'; Kuchirka 64'	Report	Benko 53'

Stal Stadium, Alchevsk
Attendance: 4,500
Referee: Ihor Horozhankin (Kirovohrad)

20 October 1993
?:?

Metalurh Kostyantynivka (1L)	3–1	(PL) Bukovyna Chernivtsi
Havrylov 10' (pen.); Dgebuadze 23'; Kovalenko 60'	Report	Matsko 75'

Avtosklo Stadium, Kostyantynivka
Attendance: 1,500
Referee: Volodymyr Vorhul (Kharkiv)

20 October 1993
?:?

Polihraftekhnika Oleksandriya (1L)	2–0	(PL) Zorya Luhansk
Shazhko 50'; Chuichenko 58'	Report

Olimp Stadium, Oleksandriya
Attendance: 7,000
Referee: Anatoliy Aranovsky (Kyiv)

20 October 1993
?:?

Vorskla Poltava (1L)	0–0	(PL) Karpaty Lviv
	Report

Vorskla Stadium, Poltava
Attendance: 3,500
Referee: Oleksandr Kosolapov (Kharkiv)

20 October 1993
?:?

Evis Mykolaiv (1L)	1–2	(PL) Nyva Vinnytsia
Zabransky 18' (pen.)	Report	Kosovskyi 3'; Naduda 45'

EVIS Stadium, Mykolaiv
Attendance: 8,000
Referee: Dmytro Martynyuk (Dnipropetrovsk)

20 October 1993
?:?

Artania Ochakiv (1L)	0–4	(PL) Metalurh Zaporizhia
	Report	Skrypnyk 5' (pen.); Klyuchik 25'; Novoseltsev 50'; Huralsky 83'

Artania Stadium, Ochakiv
Attendance: 1,500
Referee: Viktor Bezruk (Luhansk)

20 October 1993
?:?

Prykarpattia Ivano-Frankivsk (1L)	1–1	(PL) Nyva Ternopil
Hryhorchuk 24'	Report	Rudnytsky 69'

Elektron Stadium, Ivano-Frankivsk
Attendance: 6,500
Referee: Leonid Bavykin (Kharkiv)

20 October 1993
?:?

Skala Stryi (1L)	2–0	(PL) Tavriya Simferopol
Hriner 17'; Ivakhnyuk 58'	Report

Sokil Stadium, Stryi
Attendance: 5,500
Referee: Vasyl Babych (Uzhhorod)

20 October 1993
?:?

FC Lviv (3L)	2–0	(PL) Kremin Kremenchuk
Valenko 60'; Hamaliy 78'	Report

Yunist Stadium, Lviv
Attendance: 1,000
Referee: Vasyl Hrymalyuk (Kosiv)

20 October 1993
?:?

Naftokhimik Kremenchuk (2L)	1–0	(PL) Temp Shepetivka
Boiar 29'	Report

Naftokhimik Stadium, Kremenchuk
Attendance: 4,000
Referee: Oleksandr Hordiyenko (Dnipropetrovsk)

20 October 1993
?:?

Desna Chernihiv (1L)	1–0	(PL) Torpedo Zaporizhia
Avramenko 29'	Report

Gagarin Stadium, Chernihiv
Attendance: 2,500
Referee: Oleksandr Tyutyun (Fastiv)

20 October 1993
?:?

Veres Rivne (PL)	3–0	(PL) Metalist Kharkiv
Samardak 9'; O.Chervony 14'; V.Chervony 36'	Report

Avanhard Stadium, Rivne
Attendance: 9,000
Referee: Valeriy Lysenko (Odesa)

3 November 1993
?:?

FC Boryspil (2L)	1–3	(PL) Dynamo Kyiv
Romanyshyn 90'	Report	Topchiyev 24', 81'; Shkapenko 78'

Kolos Stadium, Boryspil
Attendance: 4,000
Referee: Kostyantyn Panchyk (Simferopol)

10 November 1993
?:?

Metalurh Nikopol (1L)	1–3	(PL) Dnipro Dnipropetrovsk
Kovalenko 30'	Report	Konovalov 63'; Moroz 70'; Maksymov 75'

Metalurh Stadium, Nikopol
Attendance: 1,500
Referee: Viktor Zvyahintsev (Donetsk)

==== Second leg ====
3 November 1993
?:?

Shakhtar Donetsk (PL)	7–1	(AM) Pokuttya Kolomyia
Popov 7'; Onopko 38'; Atelkin 47'; Matveyev 67', 71' (pen.), 85'; Kriventsov 90' (pen.)	Report	Paliy 53' (pen.); Kurlikovsky (red card) 90'

Shakhtar Stadium, Donetsk
Attendance: 500
Referee: Viktor Bezruk (Luhansk)

Shakhtar won 8–1 on aggregate

3 November 1993
?:?

Chornomorets Odesa (PL)	2–0	(2L) Voikovets Kerch
Zhabchenko 16'; Parakhnevych 55'	Report

Chornomorets Stadium, Odesa
Attendance: 1,000
Referee: Oleksandr Kosolapov (Kharkiv)

Chornomorets won 4–0 on aggregate

3 November 1993
?:?

Volyn Lutsk (PL)	1–0	(1L) Stal Alchevsk
Mozolyuk 33'	Report

Avanhard Stadium, Lutsk
Attendance: 1,500
Referee: Oleksandr Tyutyun (Fastiv)

Volyn won 2–2 on away goal rule

3 November 1993
?:?

Bukovyna Chernivtsi (PL)	2–0	(1L) Metalurh Kostyantynivka
Bondarchuk 45'; Kerstenyuk 90'	Report

Bukovyna Stadium, Chernivtsi
Attendance: 1,000
Referee: Vasyl Babych (Uzhhorod)

Bukovyna won 3–3 on away goal rule

3 November 1993
?:?

Zorya Luhansk (PL)	2–0	(1L) Polihraftekhnika Oleksandriya
Kuznyetsov 74'; Kara-Mustafa 81'	Report pen:4–1

Avanhard Stadium, Luhansk
Attendance: 2,500
Referee: Yevhen Yesin (Dnipropetrovsk)

Zorya won 2–2 on penalties

3 November 1993
?:?

Karpaty Lviv (PL)	3–0	(1L) Vorskla Poltava
Mazur 7'; Valenko 50', 70'	Report

Ukraina Stadium, Lviv
Attendance: 1,000
Referee: Oleksandr Kozachenko (Kyiv)

Karpaty won 3–0 on aggregate

3 November 1993
?:?

Nyva Vinnytsia (PL)	0–0	(1L) Evis Mykolaiv
	Report

Municipal Central Stadium, Vinnytsia
Attendance: 10,000
Referee: Valeriy Lysenko (Odesa)

Nyva won 2–1 on aggregate

3 November 1993
?:?

Metalurh Zaporizhia (PL)	3–0	(1L) Artania Ochakiv
Skrypnyk 5'; Petryk 72'; Varaksin 90'	Report

Metalurh Stadium, Zaporizhia
Attendance: 1,000
Referee: Volodymyr Kutsev (Donetsk)

Metalurh won 7–0 on aggregate

3 November 1993
?:?

Nyva Ternopil (PL)	4–1	(1L) Prykarpattia Ivano-Frankivsk
Demianchuk 36'; Ternavsky 52'; Korponay 53'; Mochulyak 77'	Report	Yurchenko 70'

Municipal Central Stadium, Ternopil
Attendance: 11,000
Referee: Ihor Khiblin (Khmelnytsky)

Nyva won 5–2 on aggregate

3 November 1993
?:?

Tavriya Simferopol (PL)	5 – 1 (aet)	(1L) Skala Stryi
Dzyubenko 27'; Volkov 89' (pen.); Antyukhin 94', 102'; Zadov 118'	Report	Kovalyuk 119' (pen.)

Lokomotyv Stadium, Simferopol
Attendance: 650
Referee: Viktor Holovko (Dnipropetrovsk)

Tavria won 5–3 on aggregate

3 November 1993
?:?

Kremin Kremenchuk (PL)	6–1	(3L) FC Lviv
Yankovsky 3', 18'; Zhenylenko 35'; Korponay 42'; Len 60', 80'	Report	Kutelmakh 70'

Dnipro Stadium, Kremenchuk
Attendance: 3,000
Referee: Anatoliy Aranovskiy (Kyiv)

Kremina won 6–3 on aggregate

3 November 1993
?:?

Temp Shepetivka (PL)	3–0	(2L) Naftokhimik Kremenchuk
Avakov 32'; Skachenko 71', 79'	Report

Temp Stadium, Shepetivka
Attendance: 9,000
Referee: Vasyl Hrymalyuk (Kosiv)

Temp won 3–1 on aggregate

3 November 1993
?:?

Torpedo Zaporizhia (PL)	4–2	(1L) Desna Chernihiv
Zinich 32', 51', 83'; Yesipov 71'	Report	Kulyk 53'; Savenchuk 81'

AvtoZAZ Stadium, Zaporizhia
Attendance: 1,500
Referee: Oleksandr Hordiyenko (Dnipropetrovsk)

Torpedo won 4–3 on aggregate

3 November 1993
?:?

Metalist Kharkiv (PL)	1–0	(PL) Veres Rivne
Tarasov 18'	Report

Metalist Stadium, Kharkiv
Attendance: 1,000
Referee: Dmytro Martynyuk (Dnipropetrovsk)

Veres won 3–1 on aggregate

17 November 1993
?:?

Dnipro Dnipropetrovsk (PL)	4–0	(1L) Metalurh Nikopol
Horily 21'; Polunin 36'; Dumenko 75'; Petrov 86'	Report

Meteor Stadium, Dnipropetrovsk
Attendance: 1,000
Referee: Volodymyr Vorhul (Kharkiv)

Dnipro won 7–1 on aggregate

24 November 1993
?:?

Dynamo Kyiv (PL)	4–0	(2L) FC Boryspil
Topchiyev 36'; Kovalets 53'; Vaschuk 77'; Pryzetko 89' (pen.)	Report

Republican Stadium, Kyiv
Attendance: 2,000
Referee: Roman Zan (Lviv)

Dynamo won 7–1 on aggregate

=== Second Elimination Round ===
Team 1	Agg.	Team 2	1st leg	2nd leg
FC Volyn Lutsk	3–2	FC Bukovyna Chernivtsi	2–0	1–2
FC Zorya Luhansk	3–8	FC Karpaty Lviv	2–2	1–6
FC Nyva Vinnytsia	3–4	FC Dnipro Dnipropetrovsk	2–0	1–4
FC Metalurh Zaporizhia	0–4	FC Chornomorets Odesa	0–1	0–3
FC Nyva Ternopil	0–3	SC Tavriya Simferopol	0–0	0–3
FC Kremin Kremenchuk	3–2	FC Shakhtar Donetsk	2–1	1–1
FC Temp Shepetivka	2–3	FC Torpedo Zaporizhia	2–1	0–2
FC Veres Rivne	(a) 1–1	FC Dynamo Kyiv	0–0	1–1

==== First leg ====
24 November 1993
?:?

Volyn Lutsk (PL)	2–0	(PL) Bukovyna Chernivtsi
Fedyukov 53'; Bohunov 86'	Report

Avanhard Stadium, Lutsk
Attendance: 1,500
Referee: Ihor Khiblin (Khmelnytsky)

24 November 1993
?:?

Zorya Luhansk (PL)	2–2	(PL) Karpaty Lviv
Miroshnichenko 49'; Korobchenko 87'	Report	Valenko 25'; Kardash 40'

Avanhard Stadium, Luhansk
Attendance: 1,500
Referee: Volodymyr Pianykh (Donetsk)

24 November 1993
?:?

Nyva Vinnytsia (PL)	2–0	(PL) Dnipro Dnipropetrovsk
Kosovskyi 1'; Solovienko 79'	Report

Municipal Central Stadium, Vinnytsia
Attendance: 8,000
Referee: Valeriy Onufer (Uzhhorod)

24 November 1993
?:?

Metalurh Zaporizhia (PL)	0–1	(PL) Chornomorets Odesa
	Report	Huseinov 62'

Metalurh Stadium, Zaporizhia
Attendance: 1,000
Referee: Valeriy Stoyan (Alchevsk)

24 November 1993
?:?

Nyva Ternopil (PL)	0–0	(PL) Tavriya Simferopol
	Report

Municipal Central Stadium, Ternopil
Attendance: 9,000
Referee: Viktor Derdo (Illichivsk)

24 November 1993
?:?

Kremin Kremenchuk (PL)	2–1	(PL) Shakhtar Donetsk
Fedkov 12'; Konovalchuk 74'	Report	Kriventsov 40'

Dnipro Stadium, Kremenchuk
Attendance: 3,000
Referee: Kostyantyn Panchyk (Simferopol)

24 November 1993
?:?

Temp Shepetivka (PL)	2–1	(PL) Torpedo Zaporizhia
Rolevych 5'; Chikhradze 68'	Report	Polulyakh 30'

Temp Stadium, Shepetivka
Attendance: 4,000
Referee: Valeriy Bahlay (Kyiv)

2 December 1993
?:?

Veres Rivne (PL)	0–0	(PL) Dynamo Kyiv
	Report

Avanhard Stadium, Rivne
Attendance: 10,000
Referee: Leonid Bavykin (Kharkiv)

==== Second leg ====
5 December 1993
?:?

Bukovyna Chernivtsi (PL)	2–1	(PL) Volyn Lutsk
Bondarchuk 34'; Finkel 75'	Report	Dykiy 9'; Fedorov (penalty missed) 22'

Bukovyna Stadium, Chernivtsi
Attendance: 1,000
Referee: Volodymyr Tukhovsky (Simferopol)

Volyn won 3–2 on aggregate

5 December 1993
?:?

Karpaty Lviv (PL)	6–1	(PL) Zorya Luhansk
Hamaliy 6'; Kardash 30'; Shulyatytsky 32', 65'; Marych 47'; Valenko 88'	Report	Kuznetsov 86'

Ukraina Stadium, Lviv
Attendance: 8,000
Referee: Serhiy Tatulyan (Kyiv)

Karpaty won 8–3 on aggregate

5 December 1993
?:?

Dnipro Dnipropetrovsk (PL)	4–1	(PL) Nyva Vinnytsia
Mykhailenko 27', 72' (pen.); Pavlyuchenko 39'; Pokhlebayev 73'	Report	Ovcharenko 59'

Meteor Stadium, Dnipropetrovsk
Attendance: 2,000
Referee: Valeriy Avdysh (Simferopol)

Dnipro won 4–3 on aggregate

5 December 1993
?:?

Chornomorets Odesa (PL)	3–0	(PL) Metalurh Zaporizhia
Romanchuk 63'; Bondarenko 72'; Parfyonov 86' (pen.)	Report

Chornomorets Stadium, Odesa
Attendance: 1,000
Referee: Mykhailo Sydor (Lviv)

Chornomorets won 4–0 on aggregate

5 December 1993
?:?

Tavriya Simferopol (PL)	3–0	(PL) Nyva Ternopil
Fursov 35', 84'; Kundenok 68'	Report

Lokomotyv Stadium, Simferopol
Attendance: 1,100
Referee: Vadym Shevchenko (Kyiv)

Tavriya won 3–0 on aggregate

5 December 1993
?:?

Shakhtar Donetsk (PL)	1–1	(PL) Kremin Kremenchuk
Byelichenko 35' (pen.); Byelichenko (red card) 65'	Report	Fedkov 16'; Korzanov (red card) 65'

Shakhtar Stadium, Donetsk
Attendance: 1,500
Referee: A.Lysenko (Shepetivka)

Kremin won 3–2 on aggregate

5 December 1993
?:?

Torpedo Zaporizhia (PL)	2–0	(PL) Temp Shepetivka
Vyetrov 44'; Bonetsky 89'	Report

AvtoZAZ Stadium, Zaporizhia
Attendance: 2,000
Referee: Vasyl Melnychuk (Simferopol)

Torpedo won 3–2 on aggregate

5 December 1993
?:?

Dynamo Kyiv (PL)	1–1	(PL) Veres Rivne
Shkapenko 41'	Report	Palyanytsya 34'

Republican Stadium, Kyiv
Attendance: 2,000
Referee: Viktor Zvyahintsev (Donetsk)

Veres won 1–1 on away goal rule

=== Quarterfinals ===
Team 1	Agg.	Team 2	1st leg	2nd leg
FC Volyn Lutsk	2–3	FC Karpaty Lviv	2–1	0–2
FC Dnipro Dnipropetrovsk	0–4	FC Chornomorets Odesa	0–3	0–1
SC Tavriya Simferopol	5–1	FC Kremin Kremenchuk	3–0	2–1
FC Torpedo Zaporizhia	2–2 (a)	FC Veres Rivne	2–1	0–1

==== First leg ====
29 March 1994
?:?

Volyn Lutsk (PL)	2–1	(PL) Karpaty Lviv
Sarnavsky 47'; Nikitin 77'	Report	Pokladok 65' (pen.)

Avanhard Stadium, Lutsk
Attendance: 4,000
Referee: Ihor Khiblin (Khmelnytsky)

29 March 1994
?:?

Dnipro Dnipropetrovsk (PL)	0–3	(PL) Chornomorets Odesa
	Report	Parfenov 21' (pen.); Huseinov 58'; Bohatyr 80'

Meteor Stadium, Dnipropetrovsk
Attendance: 5,000
Referee: Vadym Shevchenko (Kyiv)

29 March 1994
?:?

Tavriya Simferopol (PL)	3–0	(PL) Kremin Kremenchuk
Volkov 8' (pen.); Yesin 40'; Antyukhin 72'	Report

Lokomotyv Stadium, Simferopol
Attendance: 2,000
Referee: Volodymyr Pianykh (Donetsk)

29 March 1994
?:?

Torpedo Zaporizhia (PL)	2–1	(PL) Veres Rivne
Polulyakh 26'; Huzenko 56' (pen.)	Report	Palyanytsya 32'

AvtoZAZ Stadium, Zaporizhia
Attendance: 6,000
Referee: Valeriy Onufer (Uzhhorod)

==== Second leg ====
12 April 1994
?:?

Karpaty Lviv (PL)	2–0	(PL) Volyn Lutsk
Pokladok 49' (pen.); Hurka 71'	Report

Ukraina Stadium, Lviv
Attendance: 13,000
Referee: Leonid Bavykin (Kharkiv)

Karpaty won 3–2 on aggregate

12 April 1994
?:?

Chornomorets Odesa (PL)	1–0	(PL) Dnipro Dnipropetrovsk
Yeremeyev 41'; Telesnenko (penalty missed) 51'	Report

Chornomorets Stadium, Odesa
Attendance: 3,000
Referee: Volodymyr Pianykh (Donetsk)

Chornomorets won 4–0 on aggregate

12 April 1994
?:?

Kremin Kremenchuk (PL)	1–2	(PL) Tavriya Simferopol
Len 90'	Report	Fursov 52'; Antyukhin 69'

Dnipro Stadium, Kremenchuk
Attendance: 8,000
Referee: Serhiy Shebek (Kyiv)

Tavriya won 5–1 on aggregate

12 April 1994
?:?

Veres Rivne (PL)	1–0	(PL) Torpedo Zaporizhia
Samardak 22'	Report

Avanhard Stadium, Rivne
Attendance: 8,000
Referee: Oleksandr Tyutyun (Fastiv)

Veres won 2–2 on away goal rule

=== Semifinals ===
Team 1	Agg.	Team 2	1st leg	2nd leg
SC Tavriya Simferopol	2–0	FC Veres Rivne	2–0	0–0
FC Karpaty Lviv	1–2	FC Chornomorets Odesa	0–0	1–2

==== First leg ====
26 April 1994
?:?

Tavriya Simferopol (PL)	2–0	(PL) Veres Rivne
Kundenok 22'; Antyukhin 43'	Report

Lokomotyv Stadium, Simferopol
Attendance: 2,500
Referee: Volodymyr Pianykh (Donetsk)

27 April 1994
?:?

Karpaty Lviv (PL)	0–0	(PL) Chornomorets Odesa
	Report

Ukraina Stadium, Lviv
Attendance: 14,000
Referee: Viktor Zvyahitsev (Donetsk)

==== Second leg ====
11 May 1994
?:?

Veres Rivne (PL)	0–0	(PL) Tavriya Simferopol
	Report

Avanhard Stadium, Rivne
Attendance: 10,000
Referee: Anatoliy Aranovsky (Kyiv)

Tavriya won 2–0 on aggregate

11 May 1994
?:?

Chornomorets Odesa (PL)	2–1	(PL) Karpaty Lviv
Parakhnevych 7'; Bulyhin-Shramko 89'	Report	Pokladok 6'

Chornomorets Stadium, Odesa
Attendance: 2,600
Referee: Ihor Khiblin (Khmelnytsky)

Chornomorets won 2–1 on aggregate

=== Final ===
The final was held at the NSC Olimpiysky on May 29, 1994, in Kyiv.

29 May 1994
17:00

Chornomorets Odesa	0–0 (a.e.t.)	Tavria Simferopol
	Report
Penalties
Parfionov (penalty scored); Kulik (penalty scored); Korniyets (penalty scored); Telesnenko (penalty scored); Suslov (penalty scored)	5:3	(penalty scored) Antiukhin; (penalty missed) Fursov; (penalty scored) Volkov; (penalty scored) Oparin

Republican Stadium, Kyiv
Attendance: 5,000
Referee: Serhiy Tatulyan (Kyiv)

Ukrainian Cup 1994–95 Winners

FC Chornomorets Odesa
Second title

== Top goalscorers ==
Scorer	Goals	Team
(Ukraine) Oleksiy Antiukhin	5	Tavria Simferopol
(Ukraine) Eduard Valenko	5	FC Lviv/Karpaty
(Ukraine) Ihor Zadvorny	4	Evis Mykolaiv
(Ukraine) Roman Hryhorchuk	4	Prykarpattia Ivano-Frankivsk
(Ukraine) Vyacheslav Oleshchenko	4	Stal Alchevsk
(Ukraine) Volodymyr Havrylov	4 (4)	Metalurh Kostiantynivka

== Attendances ==
=== Top attendances ===
Rank	Round	Home team	Away team	Result	Location	Attendance
1	Semifinals	Karpaty Lviv	Chornomorets Odesa	0–0	Ukraina Stadium, Lviv	14,000
2	Quarterfinals	Karpaty Lviv	Volyn Lutsk	2–1	Ukraina Stadium, Lviv	13,000
3	Round of 32	Nyva Ternopil	Prykarpattia Ivano-Frankivsk	4–1	City Stadium, Ternopil	11,000
4	Semifinals	Veres Rivne	Tavriya Simferopol	0–0	Avanhard Stadium, Rivne	10,000
4	Round of 16	Veres Rivne	Dynamo Kyiv	0–0	Avanhard Stadium, Rivne	10,000
4	Round of 32	Nyva Vinnytsia	Evis Mykolaiv	0–0	Central Stadium, Vinnytsia	10,000
4	Round of 32	Pokuttia Kolomyia	Shakhtar Donetsk	0–1	Yunist Stadium, Kolomyia	10,000

== Number of teams by region ==
Number	Region	Team(s)
6	Luhansk Oblast	Zorya-MALS Luhansk, Khimik Severodonetsk, Dynamo Luhansk, Shakhtar Stakhanov, Avanhard Rovenky and Stal Alchevsk
5	Crimea	Tavriya Simferopol, Chaika Sevastopol, Metalurh Kerch, Dynamo Saky and Tytan Armyansk
5	Dnipropetrovsk Oblast	Dnipro Dnipropetrovsk, Metalurh Nikopol, Shakhtar Pavlohrad, Metalurh Novomoskovsk and Kryvbas Kryvyi Rih
5	Donetsk Oblast	Shakhtar Donetsk, Azovets Mariupol, Metalurh Kostiantynivka, Hirnyk Khartsyzk and Bazhanovets Makiivka
5	Lviv Oblast	Karpaty Lviv, Halychyna Drohobych, FC Lviv, Khimik Sokal and Skala Stryi
4	Odesa Oblast	Chornomorets Odesa, Chornomorets-2 Odesa, Blaho Blahoyeve and SC Odesa
4	Poltava Oblast	Kremin Kremenchuk, Naftokhimik Kremenchuk, Sula Lubny and Vorskla Poltava
4	Sumy Oblast	Naftovyk Okhtyrka, Yavir Krasnopillia, Spartak Okhtyrka and SBTS Sumy
4	Ternopil Oblast	Nyva Ternopil, Dnister Zalishchyky, Nyva Terebovlia and Krystal Chortkiv
4	Zaporizhia Oblast	Torpedo Zaporizhia, Druzhba Berdiansk, Torpedo Melitopol and Metalurh Zaporizhia
3	Kherson Oblast	Meliorator Kakhovka, Dynamo Vysokopillia and Tavriya Kherson
3	Khmelnytskyi Oblast	Temp Shepetivka, Advis Khmelnytskyi and Nord-Am-Podillya Khmelnytskyi
3	Kyiv Oblast	FC Boryspil, Nyva Karapyshi and Ros Bila Tserkva
3	Mykolaiv Oblast	Evis Mykolaiv, Evis-2 Mykolaiv and Artania Ochakiv
3	Zakarpattia Oblast	Zakarpattia Uzhhorod, Khimik Velykyi Bychkiv and Karpaty Mukachevo
2	Cherkasy Oblast	Dnipro Cherkasy and Khimik Cherkasy
2	Chernivtsi Oblast	Bukovyna Chernivtsi and Karpaty Chernivtsi
2	Ivano-Frankivsk Oblast	Prykarpattia Ivano-Frankivsk and Pokuttya Kolomyia
2	Kharkiv Oblast	Metalist Kharkiv and Avanhard Lozova
2	Kirovohrad Oblast	Polihraftekhnika Oleksandriya and Zirka Kirovohrad
2	Kyiv	Dynamo and Dynamo-2
2	Vinnytsia Oblast	Nyva Vinnytsia and Intehral Vinnytsia
2	Volyn Oblast	Volyn Lutsk and Pidshypnyk Lutsk
2	Zhytomyr Oblast	Khimik Zhytomyr and Krok Zhytomyr
1	Chernihiv Oblast	Desna Chernihiv
1	Rivne Oblast	Veres Rivne

== See also ==
- Ukrainian Premier League 1993-94
- 1993-94 Ukrainian First League
- 1993-94 Ukrainian Second League
- 1993-94 Ukrainian Third League
