= Uzbek SSR national football team =

Uzbek SSR national football team (Russian: Сборная Узбекской ССР по футболу) was the national football team of Uzbek SSR, representing Uzbek SSR at USSR championships and international football arenas from 1928 to 1992. The governing body was Uzbek SSR Football Federation.

== History ==
The year of birth of football in Uzbekistan is considered to be 1912, since it was then that football teams were created in Kokand and Fergana, a little later in Andijan, Tashkent, Samarkand and Bukhara, between which intercity matches began to be held. The first championship of Fergana Valley was held in 1914, the championship of Uzbek SSR began to be played in 1926, and Uzbek SSR Cup began to be held in 1939.

1912 is considered the year of the birth of football in Uzbekistan, since it was then that football teams were created in Kokand. The first championship of Ferghana valley was held in 1914, the Championship was established in 1926, and the drawing of the Cup has been played since 1939.

In 1928, the Uzbek national football team was created, taking place in the Spartakiade, which included representatives of some European countries. In this tournament, the national team held its first international match against Switzerland and won 8–4.

Until December 1991, Uzbekistan was represented internationally by the Soviet Union. State did have its own national team, as did the other fourteen republics, which mostly played matches with domestic teams and in football tournaments of the Spartakiad.

The national team participated in all draws of the Spartakiad football tournaments, and in 1986 reached the final, losing to the Ukrainian team 1–0.

From 1924 to 1991, was one of the five main centers of football development in the country, alongside Russia, Ukraine, Byelorussia and Georgia. The most powerful football clubs, as well as semi-professional and professional clubs were in the Football League (Higher League, First League, Second League and Second League B) and Cup. Non-professional clubs participated in the Championship and the Cup.

In 1928, Uzbek SSR national football team of was created for the first time, which took part in the Spartakiad, the participants of which included representatives of some European countries. At this tournament, the national team of Uzbek SSR played its first international match with the national team of Switzerland working clubs and won with a score of 8:4. On October 23, 1935, at the stadium "Dynamo" in Tashkent, the national team of Uzbekistan defeated Afghanistan national team with a score of 2:0. The Afghan Consul-General was present at the game. Until mid-1991, Uzbek SSR was part of USSR and had its own national team like the rest of the union republics, which mainly held matches within USSR national teams, in particular in the football tournaments of Summer Spartakiad of USSR people. Uzbek SSR national team participated in all the draws of the football tournament of Summer Spartakiad of the peoples of USSR, and in the 1986 tournament, having reached the final, lost to the national team of the Ukrainian SSR with a score of 0:1, thereby winning the silver medals of the tournament. Football clubs of Uzbek SSR at that time also participated in USSR Football Championship.

The strongest football clubs of the Uzbek SSR, as well as semi-professional and professional clubs, participated in the USSR Football Championship (Higher League, First League, Second League and Second League B) and the USSR Cup. Non-professional clubs of the Uzbek SSR participated in the championship of the Uzbek SSR and the Cup of the Uzbek SSR.
