= Duray =

Duray is a surname.

- Arthur Duray (1882 – 1954) Belgian and French auto racer
- Leon Duray (1894 – 1956) American auto racer, born as George Stewart
- Miklós Duray (1945 – 2022) Ethnic Hungarian politician in Slovakia. MP (1992 – 2010)
- Taras Duray (born 1984) Former Ukrainian professional football player
