= Ruslan Kolokolov =

Ukrainian–Soviet football player

Personal information
- Full name: Ruslan Mykolayovych Kolokolov
- Date of birth: 11 March 1966 (age 60)
- Place of birth: Kyiv, Ukrainian SSR
- Height: 1.82 m (5 ft 11 1/2 in)
- Position: Defender

Youth career
- Dynamo Kyiv

Senior career*
Years	Team	Apps	(Gls)
1983–1987	Dynamo Kyiv	0	(0)
1988–1991	Metalist Kharkiv	72	(0)
1992	Wisła Kraków	0	(0)
1992	→ Igloopol Dębica (loan)	13	(0)
1993–1994	Temp Shepetivka	28	(0)
1994	Zirka Kirovohrad	5	(1)
1995–1996	Metalurh Zaporizhia	46	(0)
1996–1997	Kryvbas Kryvyi Rih	16	(0)
1997–1998	Metalist Kharkiv	45	(3)
1997–1998	Metalist-2 Kharkiv	7	(0)
Total		251	(4)

International career
1986	Ukrainian SSR		
1987	Soviet U21	1	(0)
- * Club domestic league appearances and goals

Ruslan Kolokolov (Ukrainian: Руслан Миколайович Колоколов; born 11 March 1966) is a Ukrainian former professional footballer who played as a defender.

== Career ==
For a long time he played for Dynamo Kyiv's reserves before moving to Metalist Kharkiv where he spent almost four seasons. Later he went abroad playing in Poland, but returned to Ukraine after a year.

After winning the Soviet Cup with Metalist, Kolokolov played a couple of games at the 1988–89 European Cup Winners' Cup against Borac Banja Luka.

In 1987, he played at least one friendly for the Soviet Union national under-21 football team in a home tie against the Greece national under-21 football team in Moscow.

== Honours ==
Metalist Kharkiv

- Soviet Cup: 1987–88

Ukrainian SSR

- Spartakiad of the Peoples of the USSR: 1986
