= 1986 Soviet Second League, Zone 6 =

Football Championship of Ukrainian SSR
- Season: 1986
- Champions: Zorya Luhansk
- Promoted: Zorya Luhansk (after playoffs)
- Relegated: Stakhanovets Stakhanov
- Top goalscorer: 30 - Viktor Nastashevsky (Kryvbas)

1986 Football Championship of Ukrainian SSR was the 56th season of association football competition of the Ukrainian SSR, which was part of the Soviet Second League in Zone 6. The season started on 28 March 1986 with the game Sudobudivnyk Mykolaiv – Nyva Ternopil.

The 1986 Football Championship of Ukrainian SSR was won by FC Zorya Luhansk. Qualified for the interzonal playoffs, the team from Luhansk Oblast managed to gain promotion by winning its group.

The "Ruby Cup" of Molod Ukrayiny newspaper (for the most scored goals) was received by SC Tavriya Simferopol.

== Format ==
The season consisted of two stages preliminary and final tournaments. During the preliminary tournament participants were split into two groups of 14 teams in each with the seven best of each group qualifying for the championship group of the next stage and the seven worst played a consolation tournament.

In the final stage of both championship and consolation tournaments teams played home and away only with teams of another group. The winner of championship tournament further participated in the Soviet Second League interzonal playoffs in an effort to gain promotion to the First League, while the worst team of consolation tournament relegated to amateurs.

== Teams ==
=== Promoted teams ===
- Naftovyk Okhtyrka – Champion of the Fitness clubs competitions (KFK) (debut)

=== Relegated teams ===
- None

=== Renamed teams ===
- FC Shakhtar Pavlohrad used to be known as Kolos Mezhyrich and located in one of the city of Pavlohrad's suburbs.

== Preliminary stage ==
=== Group 1 ===
==== Location map ====
Locations of teams in Lower Second League, Zone 1

==== Final standings ====
Pos	Team	Pld	W	D	L	GF	GA	GD	Pts	Qualification
1	Tavriya Simferopol	26	14	10	2	68	23	+45	38	Qualified for the championship tournament
2	Zorya Voroshylovhrad	26	13	8	5	40	26	+14	34	Qualified for the championship tournament
3	Nyva Ternopil	26	12	9	5	34	22	+12	33	Qualified for the championship tournament
4	Torpedo Lutsk	26	13	6	7	27	20	+7	32	Qualified for the championship tournament
5	Sudobudivnyk Mykolaiv	26	9	11	6	29	23	+6	29	Qualified for the championship tournament
6	SKA Odesa	26	11	6	9	28	25	+3	28	Qualified for the championship tournament
7	Avanhard Rivne	26	9	8	9	25	22	+3	26	Qualified for the championship tournament
8	Mayak Kharkiv	26	9	7	10	21	24	−3	25	
9	Prykarpattia Ivano-Frankivsk	26	8	8	10	24	34	−10	24	
10	Desna Chernihiv	26	8	7	11	25	31	−6	23	
11	Bukovyna Chernivtsi	26	6	11	9	23	25	−2	23	
12	Krystal Kherson	26	5	11	10	25	45	−20	21	
13	Atlantyka Sevastopol	26	5	5	16	19	45	−26	15	
14	Stakhanovets Stakhanov	26	4	5	17	17	40	−23	13	

=== Group 2 ===
==== Location map ====
Locations of teams in Lower Second League, Zone 1

==== Final standings ====
Pos	Team	Pld	W	D	L	GF	GA	GD	Pts	Qualification
1	SKA Kyiv	26	14	6	6	39	21	+18	34	Qualified for the championship tournament
2	Podillya Khmelnytskyi	26	12	6	8	43	31	+12	30	Qualified for the championship tournament
3	Zakarpattia Uzhhorod	26	12	6	8	32	24	+8	30	Qualified for the championship tournament
4	Kryvbas Kryvyi Rih	26	11	8	7	41	31	+10	30	Qualified for the championship tournament
5	Okean Kerch	26	13	3	10	35	30	+5	29	Qualified for the championship tournament
6	Torpedo Zaporizhia	26	12	5	9	35	26	+9	29	Qualified for the championship tournament
7	Nyva Vinnytsia	26	11	7	8	27	23	+4	29	Qualified for the championship tournament
8	Dynamo Irpin	26	8	13	5	23	20	+3	29	
9	Spartak Zhytomyr	26	8	8	10	27	29	−2	24	
10	Zirka Kirovohrad	26	9	4	13	28	51	−23	22	
11	Naftovyk Okhtyrka	26	8	6	12	22	30	−8	22	
12	Shakhtar Horlivka	26	8	5	13	26	33	−7	21	
13	Shakhtar Pavlohrad	26	7	7	12	29	32	−3	21	
14	Novator Zhdanov	26	3	8	15	14	40	−26	14	

== Final stage ==
=== Championship tournament ===
==== Final standings ====
Pos	Team	Pld	W	D	L	GF	GA	GD	Pts	Qualification
1	Zorya Voroshylovhrad(C) (Q)	40	25	10	5	69	35	+34	60	Qualified for interzonal competitions among other Zone winners
2	Tavriya Simferopol	40	22	15	3	102	46	+56	59	
3	SKA Kyiv	40	20	9	11	65	42	+23	49	
4	Nyva Ternopil	40	17	14	9	53	38	+15	48	
5	Torpedo Lutsk	40	19	9	12	50	39	+11	47	
6	Kryvbas Kryvyi Rih	40	16	13	11	58	48	+10	45	
7	Nyva Vinnytsia	40	17	9	14	44	44	0	43	
8	Podillya Khmelnytskyi	40	16	11	13	64	50	+14	43	
9	Torpedo Zaporizhzhia	40	17	7	16	49	47	+2	41	
10	Zakarpattia Uzhhorod	40	16	9	15	50	49	+1	41	
11	Avanhard Rivne	40	16	9	15	46	44	+2	41	
12	Sudobudivnyk Mykolaiv	40	14	13	13	49	39	+10	41	
13	SKA Odesa	40	14	9	17	39	44	−5	37	
14	Okean Kerch	40	14	4	22	46	63	−17	32	

=== Consolation tournament ===
==== Final standings ====
Pos	Team	Pld	W	D	L	GF	GA	GD	Pts	Relegation
15	Bukovyna Chernivtsi	40	14	13	13	40	38	+2	41	
16	Dynamo Irpin	40	13	15	12	36	39	−3	41	
17	Prykarpattia Ivano-Frankivsk	40	12	16	12	41	46	−5	40	
18	Shakhtar Horlivka	40	15	9	16	47	47	0	39	
19	Naftovyk Okhtyrka	40	14	10	16	42	42	0	38	
20	Spartak Zhytomyr	40	14	10	16	46	48	−2	38	
21	Zirka Kirovohrad	40	16	5	19	48	79	−31	37	
22	Mayak Kharkiv	40	14	9	17	35	42	−7	37	
23	Desna Chernihiv	40	13	10	17	37	44	−7	36	
24	Shakhtar Pavlohrad	40	11	12	17	42	46	−4	34	
25	Krystal Kherson	40	9	14	17	51	72	−21	32	
26	Novator Zhdanov	40	9	13	18	31	50	−19	31	
27	Atlantyka Sevastopol	40	10	7	23	37	60	−23	27	
28	Stakhanovets Stakhanov (R)	40	7	8	25	29	65	−36	22	Relegated

(R) Relegated

== Top goalscorers ==
The following were the top ten goalscorers.

#	Scorer	Goals (Pen.)	Team
1	Viktor Nastashevsky	25	Kryvbas Kryvyi Rih
2	Volodymyr Naumenko	23	Tavriya Simferopol
3	Yuriy Yaroshenko	18	Zoria Voroshylovhrad
3	Eduard Valenko	18	Podillya Khmelnytskyi
5	Petro Pryadun	17	Nyva Ternopil
5	Yuriy Bondarenko	17	Tavriya Simferopol

== See also ==
- Soviet Second League
