= Irakli Shengelia =

Georgian-Israeli footballer

Irakli Shengelia ირაკლი შენგელია
Personal information
- Date of birth: 13 April 1981 (age 45)
- Place of birth: Georgia, Soviet Union
- Height: 1.80 m (5 ft 11 in)
- Position: Forward

Youth career
- FC Dinamo Tbilisi

Senior career*
| Years | Team | Apps | (Gls) |
| 2000 | Spartak Moscow-2 | | |
| 2000–2001 | Nyva Ternopil | | |
| 2001–2002 | Merani-91 | | |
| 2002–2005 | Dinamo Batumi | | |
| 2005–2006 | Hapoel Kfar Saba | | |
| 2006–2007 | Hapoel Ramat HaSharon | | |
- * Club domestic league appearances and goals as of 30 December 2007 ‡ National team caps and goals as of 30 December 2007

Irakli Shengelia (Georgian: ირაკლი შენგელია, Hebrew: אירקלי שנגליה; born 13 April 1981) is a Georgian-Israeli professional association football player who plies his trade at FC Merani Tbilisi.

Shengelia previously played for Spartak Moscow 2 and FC Nyva Ternopil.
