= Giorgi Davitnidze =

Georgian professional football player

Personal information
- Date of birth: 18 July 1978 (age 48)
- Place of birth: Rustavi, Georgian SSR
- Height: 1.85 m (6 ft 1 in)
- Position: Defender

Senior career*
Years	Team	Apps	(Gls)
1994–1995	FC Mretebi Tbilisi	14	(0)
1995–1997	FC Dinamo-2 Tbilisi	34	(1)
1996–1997	FC Dinamo Tbilisi	14	(0)
1998	Merani-91 Tbilisi	24	(2)
1999	FC Nyva Ternopil	6	(0)
1999–2000	FC Kolkheti-1913 Poti	20	(1)
2000	FC Uralan Elista	1	(0)
2001	Merani-91 Tbilisi	10	(0)
2001–2002	FC Lokomotivi Tbilisi	15	(0)
2002	FC Dila Gori	20	(0)
2003	FC Merani-Olimpi Tbilisi	3	(0)
2003–2008	FC Ameri Tbilisi	124	(10)
2008–2009	Hapoel Bnei Lod F.C.	5	(0)

International career
1998	Georgia	1	(0)
- * Club domestic league appearances and goals

Giorgi Davitnidze (born 18 July 1978) is a Georgian former professional footballer.
