= Shota Chomakhidze =

Georgian footballer

Personal information
- Full name: Shota Chomakhidze
- Date of birth: 17 November 1978 (age 47)
- Place of birth: Samtredia, Soviet Union
- Height: 1.76 m (5 ft 9 1/2 in)
- Position: Forward

Senior career*
Years	Team	Apps	(Gls)
1993–1998	Iberia Samtredia	79	(7)
1997	→ TSU Tbilisi (loan)	14	(1)
1999	Dinamo Tbilisi	13	(2)
1999	Kolkheti-1913 Poti	0	(0)
1999	Lokomotivi Tbilisi	12	(2)
2000–2001	Nyva Ternopil	28	(3)
2000	→ Nyva-2 Ternopil	2	(0)
2001	Iberia Samtredia	1	(0)
2001–2003	Tavriya Simferopol	25	(2)
2003	→ Torpedo Kutaisi (loan)	13	(1)
2003	Neftchi Baku	0	(0)
2004	Qarabağ Ağdam	1	(0)
2004–2005	Chikhura Sachkhere	28	(6)
2005–2006	Dinamo Sokhumi	14	(2)
2006	Chikhura Sachkhere	29	(2)
2007	Lokomotivi Tbilisi	11	(1)
2007	Ulisses	4	(0)
2008	Samtredia	14	(3)
2009	Merani Martvili	14	(4)
2009–2011	Samtredia	69	(7)
- * Club domestic league appearances and goals

Shota Chomakhidze (born 17 November 1978) is a retired footballer.

== Club career ==
Born in Samtredia, Chomakhidze began playing football for FC Samtredia. He joined Georgian first division side FC Dinamo Tbilisi in 1999, and won the Georgian championship with the club. He played for Armenian Premier League side Ulisses during 2007.

In 2000, he joined Ukrainian Premier League side FC Nyva Ternopil. He would later join fellow Premier League club SC Tavriya Simferopol.

Chomakhidze has played for the Georgia national football team at various junior levels.
