= 1982 KFK competitions (Ukraine) =

KFK competitions
- Season: 1982
- Champions: Nyva Berezhany

The 1982 KFK competitions in Ukraine were part of the 1982 Soviet KFK competitions that were conducted in the Soviet Union. It was 18th season of the KFK in Ukraine since its introduction in 1964. The winner eventually qualified to the 1983 Soviet Second League.

== First stage ==
=== Group 1 ===
Pos	Team	Pld	W	D	L	GF	GA	GD	Pts
1	Lokomotyv Ivano-Frankivsk	12	10	0	2	18	5	+13	20
2	Silmash Kovel	12	7	3	2	16	6	+10	17
3	Vatra Ternopil	12	4	4	4	15	10	+5	12
4	Budivelnyk Kuznetsovsk	12	4	2	6	11	17	−6	10
5	Kolos Kamianets-Podilskyi	12	4	2	6	9	15	−6	10
6	Lehmash Chernivtsi	12	3	2	7	10	15	−5	8
7	Temp Vinnytsia	12	3	1	8	7	18	−11	7
8	Sokil Lviv	0	-	-	-	-	-	—	0

Source: ukr-football.org.ua

=== Group 2 ===
Pos	Team	Pld	W	D	L	GF	GA	GD	Pts
1	Nyva Berezhany	14	11	2	1	35	6	+29	24
2	Khimik Kalush	14	6	4	4	12	9	+3	16
3	Kolos Kivertsi	14	5	6	3	14	13	+1	16
4	Lokomotyv Fastiv	14	6	2	6	14	11	+3	14
5	Sokil Haisyn	14	5	2	7	13	21	−8	12
6	Metalist Irshava	14	4	4	6	18	24	−6	12
7	Mayak Sarny	14	3	4	7	12	23	−11	10
8	Shakhtar Chervonohrad	14	2	4	8	8	19	−11	8

Source: ukr-football.org.ua

=== Group 3 ===
Pos	Team	Pld	W	D	L	GF	GA	GD	Pts
1	Voskhod Kyiv	14	7	4	3	18	11	+7	18
2	Elektrovymiriuvach Zhytomyr	14	6	6	2	25	18	+7	18
3	Frehat Pervomaisk	14	5	6	3	22	17	+5	16
4	Bilshovyk Kyiv	14	4	7	3	23	18	+5	15
5	Prohres Nizhyn	14	6	2	6	19	23	−4	14
6	Shakhtar Oleksandriya	14	3	7	4	19	19	0	13
7	Prapor Chyhyryn	14	4	2	8	18	27	−9	10
8	Budivelnyk Prypiat	14	2	4	8	6	17	−11	8

Source: ukr-football.org.ua

=== Group 4 ===
Pos	Team	Pld	W	D	L	GF	GA	GD	Pts
1	Shakhtar Dzerzhynsk	16	10	0	6	22	16	+6	20
2	Radyst Kirovohrad	16	9	2	5	22	17	+5	20
3	Avanhard Zaporizhia	16	8	4	4	23	9	+14	20
4	Avtomobilist Ordzhonikidze	16	7	5	4	18	14	+4	19
5	Metalurh Kupiansk	16	8	2	6	17	12	+5	18
6	Naftovyk Okhtyrka	16	8	2	6	24	24	0	18
7	Lokomotyv Poltava	16	6	2	8	21	26	−5	14
8	Lokomotyv Znamianka	16	4	2	10	15	19	−4	10
9	Naftovyk Kremenchuk	16	2	1	13	17	42	−25	5

Source: ukr-football.org.ua

=== Group 5 ===
Pos	Team	Pld	W	D	L	GF	GA	GD	Pts
1	Suvorovets Izmail	14	12	2	0	25	6	+19	26
2	Enerhiya Nova Kakhovka	14	9	3	2	32	13	+19	21
3	Tytan Armyansk	14	7	4	3	34	12	+22	18
4	Transformator Zaporizhia	14	6	1	7	13	25	−12	13
5	Shlyakhovyk Kherson	14	4	3	7	14	19	−5	11
6	Sudnoremontnyk Illichivsk	14	3	2	9	9	17	−8	8
7	Zirka Mykolaiv	14	2	4	8	10	28	−18	8
8	Budivelnyk Yalta	14	3	1	10	10	27	−17	7

Source: ukr-football.org.ua

=== Group 6 ===
Pos	Team	Pld	W	D	L	GF	GA	GD	Pts
1	Sokil Rovenky	14	9	4	1	18	7	+11	22
2	Shakhtar Sverdlovsk	14	8	4	2	29	9	+20	20
3	Avanhard Derhachi	14	7	3	4	17	12	+5	17
4	Khimik Rubizhne	14	6	3	5	23	15	+8	15
5	Kirovets Makiivka	14	4	6	4	13	10	+3	14
6	Shakhtobudivnyk Donetsk	14	4	3	7	13	19	−6	11
7	Azovstal Zhdanov	14	3	5	6	8	9	−1	11
8	Lokomotyv Synelnykove	14	0	2	12	8	45	−37	2

Source: ukr-football.org.ua

== Final ==
Final tournament took place in Ternopil and Berezhany.

Pos	Team	Pld	W	D	L	GF	GA	GD	Pts	Promotion
1	Nyva Berezhany	5	5	0	0	15	3	+12	10	Promoted to Second League
2	Suvorovets Izmayil	5	2	2	1	5	3	+2	6	
3	Skhid Kyiv	5	1	3	1	6	6	0	5	
4	Shakhtar Dzerzhynsk	5	1	2	2	4	8	−4	4	
5	Sokil Rovenky	5	0	3	2	3	6	−3	3	
6	Lokomotyv Ivano-Frankivsk	5	0	2	3	3	10	−7	2	

Source: ukr-football.org.ua
