= FC Nyva Ternopil =

Professional football club based in Ternopil, Ukraine

Nyva Ternopil
- Full name: Тернопільський професійний футбольний клуб «Нива» Тернопольский профессиональный футбольный клуб «Нива»
- Nicknames: Zhovto-Zeleni (The Yellow-Greens), Tury The Aurochs, Ternopoliany Ternopilers
- Founded: 23 July 1978; 48 years ago
- Ground: Roman Shukhevych Ternopil city stadium Ternopil
- Capacity: 15,150
- Chairman: Oleksandr Stadnyk
- Head coach: Ivan Fedyk
- League: Ukrainian First League
- 2025–26: Ukrainian First League, 12th of 16
- Website: http://fcnyva.com/
Home colours	Away colours

FC Nyva Ternopil (Ukrainian: Футбольний клуб Нива Тернопіль; Russian: Футбольный клуб Нива Тернополь) is a Ukrainian professional football club from the city of Ternopil, the administrative center of Ternopil Oblast. It plays in the Ukrainian First League, the second tier of Ukrainian football, following promotion from the 2019–20 Ukrainian Second League. Originally, the club was formed as Nyva Pidhaitsi in the small of town Pidhaitsi in 1978, then moved to a district centre Berezhany changing its name to Nyva Berezhany in 1982, and finally becoming Nyva Ternopil in 1985. In 2016, the club withdrew from the professional competitions and was reestablished as PFC Nyva Ternopil.

Their home ground is the former bird farm in the village of Velyki Hayi, but all the major home matches are played at the 15,150 seat Central City Stadium named after Roman Shukhevych, which belongs to Community of the City of Ternopil.

== History ==
=== Club names ===
- 1978–1982: FC Nyva Pidhaitsi
- 1982–1984: FC Nyva Berezhany
- 1984–2016: FC Nyva Ternopil
- 2016–present: PFC Nyva Ternopil

=== Soviet times ===
In the 1950s in Soviet Union, the strongest team in Ternopil was Dynamo. Taking part in competitions of collectives of physical culture, Dynamo several times got their way to the finals, but they were unsuccessful.

In 1958, a new team had been created – FC Avanhard Ternopil. The first success came in 1965 when they finished second in zonal tournament. Three years later, Avanhard won the champion title in the Class B. The team began to perform in the Second Group (Class A) and was renamed to Budivelnyk. The results were as follows:

1971 – 14th place; 1972 – 15; 1973 -20; 1974 – 19.

Two consecutive years of failure led to the fact that the team was disbanded.

The new club was created in 1978 at the collective farm "Shlyakh do komunizmu" (Road to the Communism) in Pidhaitsi by Ivan Potupa, the head of farm's council. Nyva played its first official match on 23 July 1978 in regional cup competition. On 16 October 1982 the team wins physical culture collectives' championship of Ukrainian SSR and moves to the biggest city in the district – Berezhany. This success gives the right to the first team from Ternopil region after 1974 to participate in the Soviet Second League. Three years later the team moves to Ternopil. In their first year in Soviet Second League 13th place was achieved. The next year Nyva finished on the same place. In 1985, they were 7th, 1986 – 4, 1987 – 2, 1988 – 12, 1989 – 3, 1990 – 4, 1991 – 4.

=== Championships of Ukraine ===
Old logo used since 2001 till 2016.

From 1992, Nyva Ternopil played in the Ukrainian Premier League, after being initially chosen to participate for being one of the top 9 (of 11) Ukrainian teams from the 1991 Soviet Second League, Zone West. Leonid Koltun was the head coach at that time and he created a colony of Kazakh players– Konstantin Pavlyuchenko, Anton Shokh, Evgeny Yarovenko, Sergey Timofeev and Fanas Salimov. Together with players from new formed states from former Soviet republics as kyrgyz Tagir Fasakhov, Moldovan Iurie Scala, Russian Sergei Polstianov and Ukrainians Yuriy Chystov, Ihor Pokydko, Petro Buts, Ihor Tsiselskyi, Yuriy Kulish, Valeriy Horoshynskyi, Vitaliy Rudnytskyi and Mykhailo Demyanchuk the team finished 4th in the Group B of 1992 Vyshcha Liha below Dynamo Kyiv, Dnipro Dnipropetrovsk and Metalist Kharkiv respectively. The next season started with bad results which caused the head coach replacement – Dynamo Kyiv and USSR national football team legend Leonid Buryak started to manage the club. He avoided relegation in the last weeks and Nyva finished in 14th place, but reached the quarter-finals of 1992-93 Ukrainian Cup, defeating amateurs Lokomotyv Rivne in Round of 32 (0–0, 2–1), 1992 bronze medalists Dnipro Dnipropetrovsk in Round of 16 (3–0, 0–2) and lost only by conceding an away goal to 1992 cup holders Metalist Kharkiv in Quarter-finals (0–1, 2–1).

The season in 1993–94 Vyshcha Liha was one of the most successful in the club's history. Leonid Buryak gathered very good players: Oleh Mochulyak, who scored 14 goals in a league, Ukrainian internationals Andriy Vasylytchuk, Dmytro Tyapushkin, Serhiy Lezhentsev, the most capped team player Ihor Biskup, Mykhailo Demyanchuk, Vitaliy Rudnytskyi, Valentyn Hrehul, Ihor Sushko, Volodymyr Lobas, Dmytro Tutychenko, Matviy Nykolaychuk, Vitaliy Shumskyi, Ivan Korponay, Russia national football team player Vladislav Ternavskiy and young Russian Andrei Gashkin. Participation in domestic cup wasn't successful as last year – after Nyva Ternopil defeated Prykarpattya Ivano-Frankivsk in West Ukrainian derby matches in Round of 32 (1–1, 4–1), in the next round they lost to the future cup runner-up Tavriya Simferopol (0–0, 0–3). At the end of the season Leonid Buryak left the team for his hometown's Chornomorets Odesa and took the best goalscorer Oleh Mochulyak and talented winger Andrei Gashkin with him. Dmytro Tyapushkin and Vladislav Ternavskiy went to Spartak Moscow, while Serhiy Lezhentsev found his place in Dynamo Kyiv.

=== Yavorskyi Era ===
Valeriy Dushkov became new head coach for the 1994–95 Vyshcha Liha, but because of bad results he was replaced by Ihor Yavorskyi, one of the best players in club's history and who will become the most successful head coach of Nyva Ternopil. The team finished 12th in a table, but reached cup Quarter-finals again. Yavir Krasnopillya (2L) were beaten in 1/16 (0–0, 4–0), then Nyva came back with a brilliant 4–0 home win after Kryvbas Kryvyi Rih defeated them heavy in the first match in Kryvyi Rih with a 3–0 score, but in Quarter-finals future cup winner Shakhtar Donetsk won 2–0 in a second leg match after 1–1 in Ternopil and went through to Semi-finals.

Current player and new playing manager Ihor Yavorskyi had started to build a new team in the next season. Midfielder Serhiy Shyshchenko was loaned from Shakhtar Donetsk, young players like Andriy Parkhomenko, Oleg Yashchuk and two Georgian twins – Avtandil Kapanadze and Tariel Kapanadze came to create a collective with players who already were in a team in the last seasons – Biskup, Demyanchuk, Romanchuk, but only 13th place in the end of the season and Quarter-final again in a cup. Format had been changed and now teams played only one match. Nyva Ternopil started from Round of 32 again and defeated second league FC Khutrovyk Tysmenytsia by the only goal of Mykhailo Demyanchuk, then home win 3–1 against league competitors Volyn Lutsk and finally away defeat in Vinnytsia in a tough match with team with a same name – Nyva Vinnytsia (0–1), which will get to the finals and lose there to Dynamo Kyiv. Oleg Yashchuk scored 10 goals in a league. Also he scored a hat-trick against Shakhtar Donetsk, which inspired Belgian scouts from R.S.C. Anderlecht. As a result, young starlet was transferred to Belgian giants during the season.

New players came before the beginning of 1996–97 season, now Ihor Yavorskyi began to bring experienced players to the squad. Ukrainian veteran Bohdan Samardak (33) came from Bukovyna Chernivtsi, Kyrgyz former international of Ukrainian descent Oleg Kazmirchuk (28) was signed as a free agent after a spell at FC Naftokhimik Kremenchuk last season, former Lithuania national football team defender/midfielder Igoris Pankratjevas (32) was transferred from Podillya Khmelnytskyi. Also the team players such as Ihor Biskup turned already 36 and Vitaliy Rudnytskyi – 32, so the most aged team in 1996–97 Vyshcha Liha finished in the midtable in 9th place, which was the best result of the time under Ihor Yavorskyi as a head coach.

The next season was the last for young head coach. Zhovto-zeleni repeated the success they had under Buryak as a head coach in 1994. Almost until the last match they held 6th place but lost it to Metalurh Donetsk which played only first year in Vyshcha Liha. Quarter-finals already became a tradition for the team from Ternopil, as they reached this round for the fourth time in 7 competitions since start in 1992. The 1997–98 Ukrainian Cup was real metallurgical competition for Nyva as they played only with teams called Metalurh: Round of 32 – Metalurh Nikopol (1–1, 4–1), Round of 16 – Metalurh Zaporizhia (1–2, 3–1), QF – Metalurh Donetsk (2–1, 0–1). The new promoted team from Donetsk became a real threat for that year. Ihor Yavorskyi resigned after the 29th match in league, so the last match of the season was played under Leonid Ishchuk as a head coach. Avtandil Kapanadze became top goalscorer 15 times finding the net. Such players like goalkeepers Yuriy Chumak and Yuriy Nikitenko, field players Andriy Kyrlyk, Ihor Biskup, Oleh Mishenin, Mykola Lapa, Vitaliy Kut, Vitaliy Pervak, Tariel Kapanadze, Yuriy Fokin, Mykola Zakotyuk, Bohdan Samardak, Serhiy Turyanskyi and Andriy Shpak also played a huge role in the last successful season in Vyshcha Liha in the 20th century.

=== Georgian colony and relegation ===
Inspired by good results of Kapanadze brothers, team president of that time – Avtandil Mdinaradze, who is Georgian too began to sign players of same nationality. As a result, five new players from Georgia including Giorgi Davitnidze, Avtandil Gvianidze, Shalva Khujadze, Kakhaber Dgebuadze and Aleksandr Kaidarashvili became new players in 1997. Together with two Kapanadze brothers and Avtandil Sikharulidze who came last year new head coach Ihor Yurchenko registered 8 Georgian players for 1998–99 Vyshcha Liha. Two wins at the start of the season but only 13th place on the finish.

Financial problems began to be a main problem for the 1999–2000 season. Ihor Yurchenko left and Valeriy Bohuslavskyi was called to make things better. But now the team from Ternopil was an outsider and everyone saw Zhovto-Zeleni in the relegation zone in the end of season. Talented Georgians couldn't play well every match because the lack of discipline. Shalva Khujadze and Giorgi Davitnidze went back home and signed to FC Lokomotivi Tbilisi and FC Kolkheti-1913 Poti respectively and they were changed by their countrymen Shota Chomakhidze from FC Lokomotivi Tbilisi and Konstantin Metreveli. Muslim Agaýew and Yuri Magdiýew became first Turkmen legioners. Squad consisted of a lot of new names, because lack of money caused the departure of best players of the last years. Thirty-three years old goalkeeper Hennadiy Losev played 22 matches in 1999–2000 Vyshcha Liha, Ukrainian players Pavlo Filipenko, Oleksandr Boytsan, Mykola Lapa, Dmytro Mazur, Serhiy Kryvyi and all the foreign players played most matches of the club and struggled to avoid the relegation. Positive result came in the last match of the season. Nyva Ternopil had to play in Lviv in Halychyna Derby with Karpaty Lviv. Team from Ternopil won 1–0 with an own goal scored by Karpaty defender. Nyva finished in 12th place out of 16 teams and stayed in Vyshcha Liha for one season more. 1999-2000 Ukrainian Cup was lost in Round of 16 to Karpaty Lviv with 1–2 score in overtime.

Bohuslavskyi started to prepare team for the next season. Financial crisis hadn't been solved so the club couldn't hold their best players and sign new ones of high quality. Matviy Nykolaychuk came back to his old club after he left in 1995 for Chornomorets Odesa. Nyva Ternopil earned 6 points in the first 8 weeks of 2000-2001 Vyshcha Liha and Valeriy Bohuslavskyi had been sacked by club bosses after record scoring lose to current title holders Dynamo Kyiv 3–7. New old head coach Ihor Yavorskyi had been appointed in September 2000 after 2 years of departure. Players played remaining 5 matches of the first half of a season and earned 3 more points in the Halychyna Derby 5–2 win against Karpaty Lviv, where team veterans Avtandil Kapanadze scored twice and Matviy Nykolaychuk one time found the net. The winter break was the hardest time in club's history. Players didn't get their salaries and most of them left for more successful teams. Two new Georgian 19 years old youngsters Tengiz Ugrekhelidze and Irakli Shengelia signed contracts and many young players from the farm club FC Ternopil-Nyva-2 had been called to play for the main team for the second half of the season. In addition three Bulgarian players – defender Stanimir Stalev, midfielder Vasil Kolev from Botev Plovdiv and forward Yulian Neychev from PFC Svetkavitsa had been signed to help Nyva Ternopil to stay in Vyshcha Liha for the next season. Starting with two defeats in second half Yavorskyi resigned and new appointed head coach became club's legend Ihor Biskup, who started a season as a player and played in 4 matches in league. Zhovto-Zeleni lost in all remaining matches of the season, finished in the last 14th place and relegated to 2002–03 Ukrainian First League. As a result of bad financial situation 37 players played in the last season and 3 head coaches managed the club.

=== Lower leagues and new owners ===
All foreign players left after relegation except 38 year old Tariel Kapanadze and Stanimir Stalev. The squad consisted of young and experienced players. Head coach Ihor Biskup, who almost turned 41, renewed his football career because the lack of players for the first team and became the oldest player ever played for Nyva. He started to build the team from young players from Ternopil, like 17 years old Taras Duray, 18 years old Vasyl Rybak, 19 years old Oleksandr Zhdakha, 20 years old goalkeeper Roman Hurin, Anatoliy Ptashnyk, Taras Litynskyi and experienced Pavlo Syrotin, Serhiy Laktionov, Stanislav Kozakov, Viktor Bohatyr, who couldn't struggle against relegation and dropped down to 2002-03 Ukrainian Second League from the bottom of 2001-02 Ukrainian First League.

Since the 2002–03 season, the club was taking part in the Druha Liha A and results were as follows:

2002–03 – 8th place, 2003–04 – 6, 2004–05 – 15, 2005–06 – 4.

The most notable players of that time were Roman Hurin, Serhiy Shymanskyi, who also managed the club in 2005, Ivan Papazov, Serhiy Sernetskyi, Andriy Hrinchenko, Oleksandr Zhdakha, Taras Duray, Denys Adleyba, Kostyantyn Lemishko, Andriy Nikanovych and veteran Lyubomyr Vovchuk.

=== Honors ===
- Ukrainian Amateur Cup (1, Nyva Pidhaitsi): 1980

=== Football kits and sponsors ===
Years	Football kit	Shirt sponsor
1993–1994	Pony	
1994-1995	Pony	Pony
1997–2000	Adidas	
2004-2005	Adidas	
2005–2007	Lotto	Ternopil'ski Oholoshennya
2007–2011	Adidas	Rodyna
2011–2012	Adidas	
2012–2015	Joma	
2015	Sektor K	ZIK
2016-	Sektor K	Rodyna

== Stadium ==
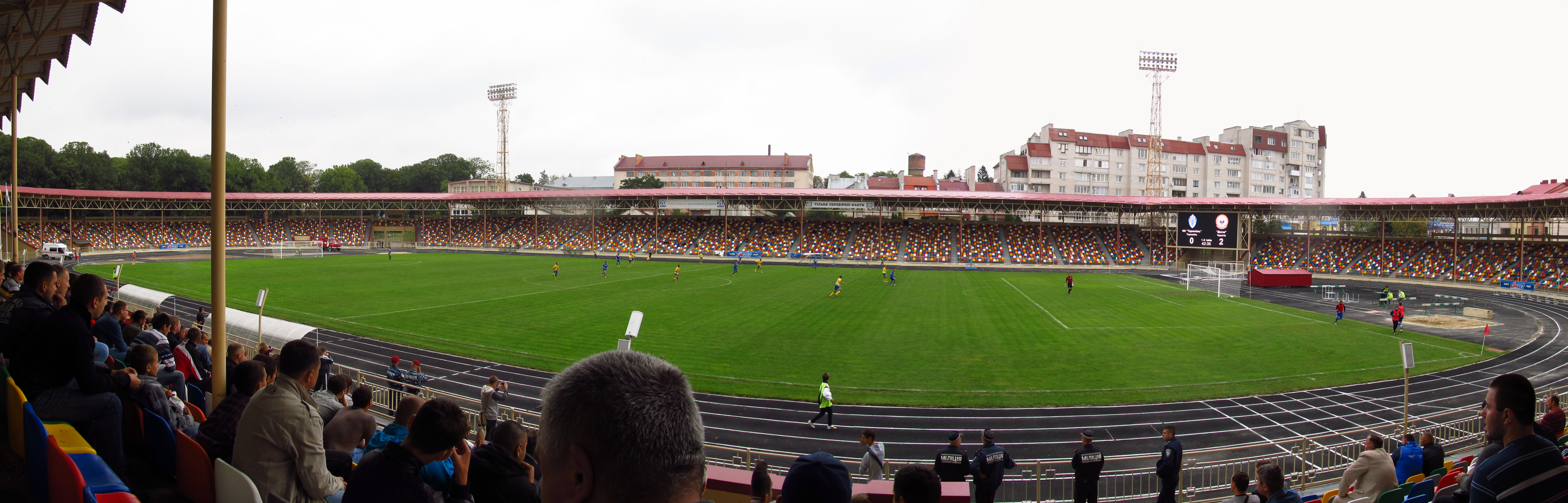
City Stadium

Since moving to Ternopil for long period Nyva played its games at the main city sports facility, the City Stadium (Miskyi stadion).

In 2015–2016, the club played some of its games at Village Stadium (Silskyi stadion) in the neighboring village Velykyi Hai.

In 2017, the club moved away from Ternopil into a small city of Vyshnivets to the north of Ternopil Oblast.

== Reserves and the Academy ==
=== Nyva-2 ===
In 2024 Nyva created another "Nyva-2" team in cooperation with FC Sambir.

=== Nyva-Ternopil-2 ===
Its first reserve team Nyva created in 2000 which was based on a team of the local pedagogical school.

== Honours ==
- Ukrainian Second League
  - Champions (2): 2008–09, 2019–20

== League and cup history ==
=== Soviet Union ===
Season	Div.	Pos.	Pl.	W	D	L	GS	GA	P	Soviet Cup	Europe	Notes
Nyva Pidhaitsi
1979	Rep. (2)	2	20	13	4	3	41	17	30			
1980	Rep. (1)	1	22	17	3	2	56	13	37			Qualified to finals
1980	Rep. (Finals)	2	5	3	1	1	10	3	7			
1981	Rep. (1)	1	22	17	5	0	58	9	39			Qualified to finals
1981	Rep. (Finals)	2	5	2	2	1	6	4	6			
Nyva Berezhany
1982	Rep. (2)	1	14	11	2	1	35	6	24			Qualified to finals
1982	Rep. (Finals)	1	5	5	0	0	15	3	10			Admitted to All-Union competitions
1983	3rd (6)	13	50	15	18	17	41	51	48			
1984	3rd (6)	13	38	17	10	11	52	32	44			
Nyva Ternopil
1985	3rd (6)	7	40	17	9	14	44	44	43			
1986	3rd (6)	4	40	17	14	9	53	38	48			
1987	3rd (6)	2	52	28	16	8	85	38	72			
1988	3rd (6)	12	50	19	13	18	66	59	51			
1989	3rd (6)	3	52	29	12	11	78	45	70			
1990	3rd (West)	4	42	22	11	9	70	51	55			
1991	3rd (West)	4	42	25	6	11	56	29	56			
1992	No league competitions											

=== Ukraine ===
Season	Div.	Pos.	Pl.	W	D	L	GS	GA	P	Ukrainian Cup	Europe		Notes
1992	1st "B"	4	18	8	5	5	16	12	21	R32			
1992–93	1st	14	30	8	9	13	22	25	25	QF			
1993–94	1st	7	34	13	10	11	44	26	36	R16			
1994–95	1st	12	34	11	5	18	40	44	38	R16			
1995–96	1st	13	34	13	3	18	37	42	42	QF			
1996–97	1st	9	30	8	9	13	33	41	33	R16			
1997–98	1st	7	30	12	4	14	37	39	40	QF			
1998–99	1st	13	30	8	7	15	29	41	31	R16			
1999–00	1st	12	30	7	10	13	40	57	31	R16			
2000–01	1st	14	26	2	3	21	20	65	9	R16			Relegated
2001–02	2nd	18	34	3	4	27	20	77	13	R16			Relegated
2002–03	3rd "A"	8	28	10	5	13	29	36	35	R32			
2003–04	3rd "A"	6	30	13	8	9	30	36	47	R32			
2004–05	3rd "A"	15	28	4	5	19	18	47	17	R32			
2005–06	3rd "A"	4	28	14	8	6	34	18	50	R32			
2006–07	3rd "A"	4	28	15	8	5	33	15	53	R32			
2007–08	3rd "A"	2	30	18	10	2	52	15	64	R16			
2008–09	3rd "A"	1	32	21	8	3	50	26	71	R64			Promoted
2009–10	2nd	18	34	3	4	27	18	72	7	R32			Relegated −6
2010–11	3rd "A"	10	22	5	2	15	17	51	14	R32			−3
2011–12	3rd "A"	12	26	9	6	11	30	41	18	Withdrew			–15
2012–13	3rd "A"	2	20	11	5	4	29	17	38	1/8 finals			
2012–13	3rd "1"	2	10	5	4	1	18	5	19	1/8 finals			Promoted
2013–14	2nd	10	30	10	9	11	33	32	39	1/4 finals			
2014–15	2nd	13	30	8	3	19	25	52	27	1/16 finals			
2015–16	2nd	16	30	2	4	24	10	26	7	1/32 finals			−3 – Withdrew
2016	4th Group 3 (Amateur Championship)	2	6	1	4	1	4	3	7	-	-	-	-
2016–17	4th Group 1 (Amateur Championship)	7	19	5	6	8	15	23	21	-	-	-	Admitted to SL
2017–18	3rd"A" (Second League)	7	27	9	6	12	25	29	33	1/32 finals	-	-	-
2018–19	3rd"A" (Second League)	6	27	10	6	11	28	29	36	1/64 finals	-	-	-
2019–20	3rd"A" (Second League)	1	20	12	5	3	27	12	41	1/64 finals	-	-	Promoted to Ukrainian First League
2020–21	2nd (First League)	13	30	8	7	15	30	50	31	1/32 finals	-	-	-
2021–22	2nd (First League)	5	20	8	5	7	22	22	29	-	-	-	-
2022–23	2nd (First League)	4	14	5	5	4	15	8	20	-	-	-	Qualified to Championship group
2022–23	2nd (First League)	7	14	0	8	6	10	17	8	-	-	-	-
2023–24	2nd (First League)	13	28	9	9	10	29	29	36	-	-	-	-
2024–25	2nd"A" (First League)	5/8	14	4	4	6	13	17	16	1/64 finals	-	-	Admitted to Relegation Group
2024–25	2nd"Relegation Group" (First League)	11/17	24	8	8	8	28	27	32	1/64 finals	-	-	-
2025–26	2nd (First League)	12/16	30	8	10	12	24	34	34	1/8 finals	-	-	-
2026–27	2nd (First League)	8/16	4	1	2	1	4	4	5	1/32 finals	-	-	TBD

== Players ==
=== Current squad ===
As of 15 November 2026

Note: Flags indicate national team as defined under FIFA eligibility rules; some limited exceptions apply. Players may hold more than one non-FIFA nationality.

No.	Pos.	Nation	Player
1	GK	UKR	Maksym Mekhaniv
4	DF	UKR	Andriy Demydenko
8	MF	UKR	Marko Kytsun
10	MF	UKR	Ivan Palamarchuk
11	DF	UKR	Milan Mykhalchuk
15	FW	UKR	Denys Dovbetskyi
17	MF	UKR	Maksym Pezhynskyi
18	DF	UKR	Bohdan Biloshevskyi
19	FW	UKR	Vladyslav Buhay
22	FW	UKR	Maksym Uhrynyuk
23	GK	UKR	Volodymyr Sharun
26	GK	UKR	Markiyan Bakus
27	MF	UKR	Vitaliy Mykhayliv
28	MF	UKR	Artem Habelok
30	MF	UKR	Taras Halas

No.	Pos.	Nation	Player
33	MF	UKR	Maryan Mysyk
35	FW	UKR	Andriy Demyanchuk
38	DF	UKR	Dmytro Paruta
41	DF	UKR	Yurii Dudnyk
44	MF	UKR	Serhiy Davydov
45	FW	UKR	Andriy Boryachuk
59	MF	UKR	Roman Mykhayliv
70	FW	UKR	Anton Dudik
74	MF	UKR	Kostyantyn Kvas
75	DF	UKR	Ihor Snurnitsyn
77	FW	UKR	Nazar Kasarda
91	FW	UKR	Denys Rezepov
94	MF	UKR	Vasyl Burtnyk
99	FW	UKR	Bohdan-Yulian Vyshynskyi

=== Out on loan ===
Note: Flags indicate national team as defined under FIFA eligibility rules; some limited exceptions apply. Players may hold more than one non-FIFA nationality.

No. / Pos. / Nation / Player	No. / Pos. / Nation / Player

== Presidents ==
- 1993–1996 Volodymyr Koval
- 1996–1998 Volodymyr Marynovskyi
- 1998–2005 Oleksandr Kryvyi
- 2005–2007 Oleh Sadovskyi
- 2007–2012 Stepan Rubai
- 2012–2015 Avtandil Mdinaradze
- 2015 Stepan Rubai
- 2016– Oleksandr Stadnyk

== Coaches ==
- Head coach – Yuriy Virt
- Coach – Oleksandr Stakhiv
- Goalkeeping coach – Vyacheslav Kotlyar

== See also ==
- City Stadium
- FC Ternopil
