= 1979 Football Cup of Ukrainian SSR among KFK =

1979 Ukrainian Amateur Cup
Tournament details
- Country: Soviet Union (Ukrainian SSR)

Final positions
- Champions: FC Enerhiya Nova Kakhovka
- Runners-up: FC Tsementnyk Mykolaiv

The 1979 Football Cup of Ukrainian SSR among KFK was the annual season of Ukraine's football knockout competition for amateur football teams.

== Competition schedule ==
=== First qualification round ===
| Team 1 | Score | Team 2 |
|---|---|---|
| FC Enerhiya Nova Kakhovka | 6–2 | FC Sudnoremontnyk Illichivsk |
| FC Tsementnyk Mykolailv | 4–0 | FC Khimik Perechyn |
| FC Shakhtar Stakhanov | 1–0 | FC Khimik Slovyansk |
| FC Voskhod Kyiv | 6–2 | FC Avanhard Mohyliv-Podilskyi |
| FC Khvylia Mykolaiv | 3–1 | FC Tytan Armyansk |
| FC Lokomotyv Kovel | 4–0 | FC Podillia Ternopil |
| FC Mayak Kharkiv | 0–0 (5–3 p) | FC Kolos Poltava |
| FC Prohres Nizhyn | 1–1 (4–3 p) | SKIF Kyiv |
| FC Shakhtar Dzerzhynsk | 3–0 | FC Komunarets Komunarsk |
| FC Meteor Simferopol | +/- | FC Chaika Svitlovodsk |
| FC Sokil Lviv | 3–0 | FC Meteor Chernivtsi |
| FC Start Zaporizhia | 1–0 | FC Vykhor Dnipropetrovsk |
| FC Avanhard Novohrad-Volynskyi | +/- | FC Vodnyk Rivne |
| FC Podillia Kamianets-Podilskyi | 3–2 | FC Bystrytsia Nadvirna |
| FC Avanhard Derhachi | 4–0 | FC Avtomobilist Sumy |
| FC Refryzherator Fastiv | 2–1 | FC Tiasmyn Smila |

=== Second qualification round ===
| Team 1 | Score | Team 2 |
|---|---|---|
| FC Enerhiya Nova Kakhovka | 7–0 | FC Meteor Simferopol |
| FC Tsementnyk Mykolailv | 3–0 | FC Sokil Lviv |
| FC Shakhtar Stakhanov | 2–0 | FC Start Zaporizhia |
| FC Voskhod Kyiv | 1–0 | FC Avanhard Novohrad-Volynskyi |
| FC Shakhtar Dzerzhynsk | 4–0 | FC Khvylia Mykolaiv |
| FC Lokomotyv Kovel | 2–1 | FC Podillia Kamianets-Podilskyi |
| FC Mayak Kharkiv | 3–1 | FC Avanhard Derhachi |
| FC Prohres Nizhyn | 1–0 | FC Refryzherator Fastiv |

=== Quarterfinals (1/4) ===
| Team 1 | Score | Team 2 |
|---|---|---|
| FC Enerhiya Nova Kakhovka | 2–0 | FC Khvylia Mykolaiv |
| FC Tsementnyk Mykolailv | 1–0 | FC Lokomotyv Kovel |
| FC Shakhtar Stakhanov | 1–0 | FC Mayak Kharkiv |
| FC Voskhod Kyiv | 3–1 | FC Prohres Nizhyn |

=== Semifinals (1/2) ===
| Team 1 | Score | Team 2 |
|---|---|---|
| FC Enerhiya Nova Kakhovka | 3–2 | FC Shakhtar Stakhanov |
| FC Tsementnyk Mykolailv | 1–0 | FC Voskhod Kyiv |

=== Final ===
| Team 1 | Agg. | Team 2 | 1st leg | 2nd leg |
|---|---|---|---|---|
| FC Enerhiya Nova Kakhovka | 3–1 | FC Tsementnyk Mykolailv | 3–1 | 0–0 |

== See also ==
- 1979 KFK competitions (Ukraine)
