= Avtandil Kapanadze =

Soviet-Georgian footballer

Personal information
- Full name: Avtandil Kapanadze
- Date of birth: 1 December 1962 (age 63)
- Place of birth: Tbilisi, Soviet Union
- Height: 1.71 m (5 ft 7 in)
- Position: Forward

Senior career*
Years	Team	Apps	(Gls)
1984–1986	FC Locomotive Tbilisi	80	(15)
1987	FC Guria Lanchkhuti	2	(0)
1987	FC Torpedo Kutaisi	9	(0)
1988–1993	FC Metalurgi Rustavi	184	(66)
1993–1995	FC Temp Shepetivka	77	(6)
1996–2001	FC Nyva Ternopil	134	(54)
2001–2004	FC Lokomotiv Nizhniy Novgorod	49	(3)
- * Club domestic league appearances and goals

Avtandil Kapanadze (Georgian: ავთანდილ კაპანაძე, born 1 December 1962) is a Soviet/Georgian striker.

He has a twin brother, Tariel Kapanadze, who is also a football player.
