= Football at the 1986 Spartakiad of the Peoples of the USSR =

1986 Spartakiad of Peoples of the USSR football tournament
Tournament details
- Host country: Ukrainian SSR
- Dates: 9 July – 27 July
- Teams: 17
- Venue(s): 6 (in 6 host cities)

Final positions
- Champions: (Ukrainian Soviet Socialist Republic) Ukrainian SSR (1st title)
- Runners-up: (Uzbek Soviet Socialist Republic) Uzbek SSR
- Third place: Moscow
- Fourth place: (Moldavian Soviet Socialist Republic) Moldavian SSR

Tournament statistics
- Matches played: 44
- Goals scored: 150 (3.41 per match)

The football tournament at the 1986 Spartakiad of Peoples of the USSR was a preparatory competition for the Soviet Union Olympic football team among the Olympic reserves. The competition took place on July 9 through July 27, 1986 as part of the Spartakiad of Peoples of the USSR.

The competition included footballers under 21 years of age (born between 1965 and 1968). All participating teams at first were split in four groups with top two team in each of them advancing to the next round forming two semifinal groups of four in each. Depending on their standing in their groups, teams would play off with another team that placed the same place in another group.

== Competition ==
=== Preliminary games ===
All times local (UTC+3)

Key to colours in group tables
Team progressed to the semifinals

Group 1 (Nikopol and Ordzhonikidze)

Team	Pld	W	D	L	GF	GA	GD	Pts
(Russian Soviet Federative Socialist Republic) RSFSR	4	4	0	0	14	2	+12	8
(Saint Petersburg) Leningrad	4	2	1	1	7	2	+5	5
(Estonian Soviet Socialist Republic) Estonia	4	2	1	1	7	8	−1	5
(Armenian Soviet Socialist Republic) Armenia	4	1	0	3	3	6	-3	2
(Kirghiz Soviet Socialist Republic) Kyrgyzia	4	0	0	4	2	15	-13	0

Leningrad finished second ahead of Estonia based on their goal difference.

Group 2 (Zaporizhia)

Team	Pld	W	D	L	GF	GA	GD	Pts
Moscow	3	1	2	0	8	0	+8	4
(Kazakh Soviet Socialist Republic) Kazakhstan	3	1	2	0	6	2	+4	4
(Georgian Soviet Socialist Republic) Georgia	3	0	3	0	3	3	0	3
(Tajik Soviet Socialist Republic) Tajikistan	3	0	1	2	3	15	-12	1

Moscow finished first ahead of Kazakhstan based on their goal difference.

Group 3 (Donetsk)

Team	Pld	W	D	L	GF	GA	GD	Pts
(Ukrainian Soviet Socialist Republic) Ukraine	3	3	0	0	4	1	+3	6
(Uzbek Soviet Socialist Republic) Uzbekistan	3	1	1	1	7	4	+3	3
(Byelorussian Soviet Socialist Republic) Belorussia	3	1	0	2	4	8	−4	2
(Azerbaijan Soviet Socialist Republic) Azerbaijan	3	0	1	2	1	3	-2	1

Group 4 (Kharkiv)

Team	Pld	W	D	L	GF	GA	GD	Pts
(Latvian Soviet Socialist Republic) Latvia	3	2	0	1	4	4	0	4
(Moldavian Soviet Socialist Republic) Moldavia	3	1	1	1	4	2	+2	3
(Lithuanian Soviet Socialist Republic) Lithuania	3	1	1	1	2	2	0	3
(Turkmen Soviet Socialist Republic) Turkmenia	3	1	0	2	1	4	-3	2

Moldavia finished second ahead of Lithuania based on their goal difference.

=== Semifinals groups ===
Group A (Nikopol and Ordzhonikidze)

Team	Pld	W	D	L	GF	GA	GD	Pts
(Ukrainian Soviet Socialist Republic) Ukraine	3	3	0	0	10	2	+8	6
(Moldavian Soviet Socialist Republic) Moldavia	3	2	0	1	4	2	+2	4
(Russian Soviet Federative Socialist Republic) RSFSR	3	1	0	2	4	2	+2	2
(Kazakh Soviet Socialist Republic) Kazakhstan	3	0	0	3	2	14	-12	0

Group B (Zaporizhia)

Team	Pld	W	D	L	GF	GA	GD	Pts
(Uzbek Soviet Socialist Republic) Uzbekistan	3	2	1	0	7	0	+7	5
Moscow	3	1	2	0	8	1	+7	4
(Latvian Soviet Socialist Republic) Latvia	3	1	0	2	3	14	−11	2
(Saint Petersburg) Leningrad	3	0	1	2	2	5	-3	1

=== Final playoffs ===
- 7th place playoff (Nikopol). Leningrad – Kazakh SSR 2:0
- 5th place playoff (Ordzhonikidze). RSFSR – Latvian SSR 5:2
- 3rd place playoff (Kiev). Moscow – Moldavian SSR 3:1
- 1st place playoff (Kiev). Ukraine – Uzbek SSR 1:0

== 1986 Champions – Ukrainian SSR ==
- Head coach – Viktor Kolotov, assistant coaches – Volodymyr Troshkin, Yevhen Kotelnykov
- Andriy Kovtun (SKA Kiev), Volodymyr Tsytkin (Dynamo Irpin), Volodymyr Horilyi (Dynamo Kyiv), Serhiy Shmatovalenko (SKA Odessa), Oleh Derevinsky (Dynamo Kyiv), Oleksandr Dyuldyn, Oleksandr Enei, Ruslan Kolokolov (Dynamo Kyiv), Oleksandr Nefedov (Dynamo Kyiv), Oleksandr Rolevych (SKA Odessa), Serhiy Kovalets (Zirka Berdychiv), Syarhey Herasimets (Shakhtar Donetsk), Oleksandr Yesipov (Metalist Kharkiv), Oleksandr Ivanov (Metalist Kharkiv), Serhiy Khudozhylov (SKA Kiev), Andriy Mareyev, Oleksandr Hushchyn (Dynamo Kyiv), Andriy Sydelnykov (Dynamo Kyiv), Vasyl Storchak (Torpedo Lutsk), Oleh Serdyuk (Shakhtar Donetsk), V.Marchuk
