= Shalva Khujadze =

Georgian footballer

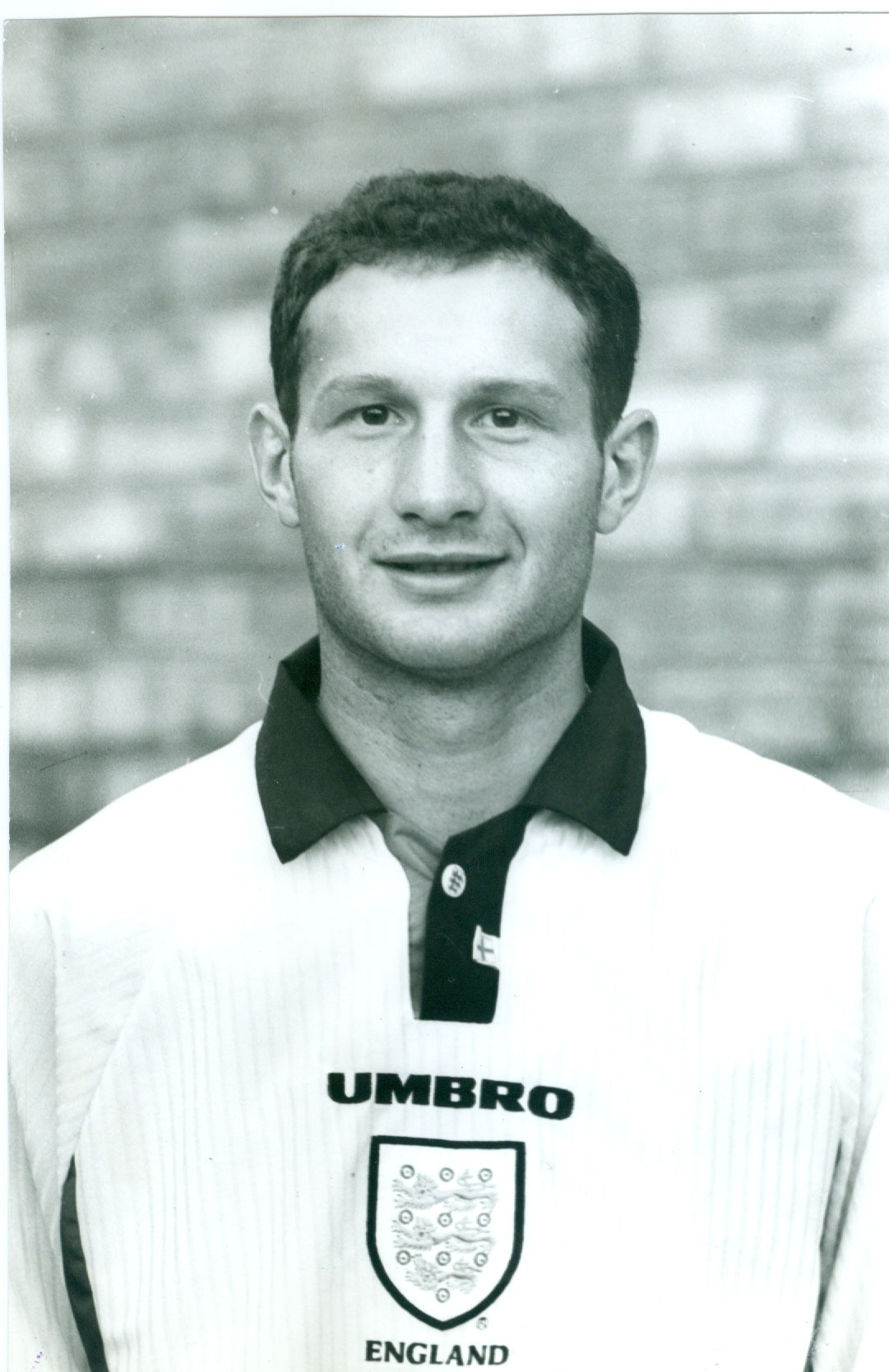

Personal information
- Date of birth: 5 October 1975 (age 51)
- Place of birth: Tbilisi, Georgian
- Height: 1.80 m (5 ft 11 in)
- Position: Midfielder

Senior career*
Years	Team	Apps	(Gls)
1992–1993	Gorda Rustavi	20	(0)
1993–1995	FC Dinamo Tbilisi	23	(1)
1995–1996	FC Kolkheti-1913 Poti	34	(4)
1997–1998	FC Torpedo Kutaisi	43	(5)
1998	FC Nyva Ternopil	6	(0)
1999	FC Lokomotivi Tbilisi	13	(1)
1999–2000	FC Dinamo Batumi	19	(0)
2000–2001	Merani-91 Tbilisi	10	(0)
2001–2002	FC Dinamo Batumi	30	(3)
2002	A.O. Agios Nikolaos Kritis	3	(1)
2002	FC Dinamo Batumi	18	(1)
2003–2004	FC Sioni Bolnisi	29	(0)
2004–2005	FC Dinamo Batumi	23	(0)

International career
1996	Georgia	2	(0)
- * Club domestic league appearances and goals

Shalva Khujadze (Georgian: შალვა ხუჯაძე) is a retired Georgian professional football player.

His younger brother Irakli Khujadze also played football professionally.
