= Ihor Biskup =

Ukrainian association football player

Personal information
- Full name: Ihor Ivanovych Biskup
- Date of birth: 11 August 1960 (age 66)
- Place of birth: Monastyryska, Ukrainian SSR
- Height: 1.78 m (5 ft 10 in)
- Position: Defender

Youth career
- Budivelnyk Monastyryska

Senior career*
Years	Team	Apps	(Gls)
1976–1977	Budivelnyk Monastyryska		
1978–1980	Nyva Pidhaitsi		
1981	Podillia Khmelnytskyi	6	(0)
1983–2002	Nyva Ternopil	551	(56)
2000	→ Ternopil-Nyva-2	12	(2)

Managerial career
- 1999–2001: Nyva Ternopil (assistant)
- 2001: Nyva Ternopil
- 2002–2003: Nyva Ternopil (assistant)
- 2003–2007: White Bear FC
- 2008: Nyva Ternopil (manager/sports director)
- 2009–2010: Nyva Ternopil (nachalnik)
- 2010: Nyva Ternopil
- 2010: Ahro-Zbruch Pidvolochysk
- 2011: Nyva Ternopil
- * Club domestic league appearances and goals

Ihor Biskup (Ukrainian: Ігор Іванович Біскуп; born 11 August 1960) is a former Soviet and Ukrainian footballer and Ukrainian football coach. He is known as a record holder for the most appearances for FC Nyva Ternopil in 1978-2002 during which the club transformed from an amateur team to the flagman of local football.

Biskup participated in the 1991–92 Soviet Cup when Nyva beat FC Ararat Yerevan and Biskup scored a goal (an equalizer). After that game, Nyva did not go to the next match in Yerevan due to the Nagorno-Karabakh conflict as Ararat has forfeited it. The decision of not traveling to the Caucasus region was taken after the away game against PFC Spartak Nalchik (1991 Soviet Second League) which Nyva lost, but Nyva's players were threatened with physical "influence".

Ihor Biskup has a son Andriy who also played football as a defender at lower Ukrainian leagues including FC Nyva Ternopil.
