= Taras Duray =

Ukrainian professional football player

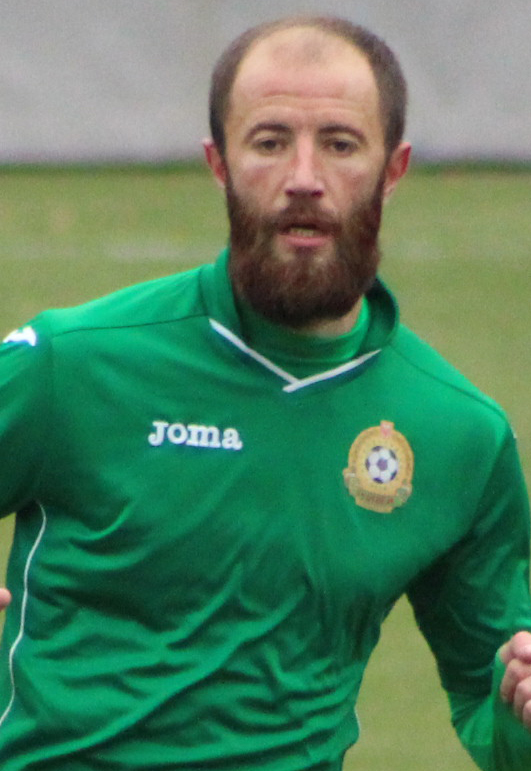

Personal information
- Date of birth: 31 July 1984 (age 42)
- Place of birth: Ternopil, Ukrainian SSR
- Height: 1.83 m (6 ft 0 in)
- Position: Centre back

Senior career*
Years	Team	Apps	(Gls)
2001–2011	Nyva Ternopil	123	(10)
2009	→ Zorya Luhansk (loan)	17	(0)
2010	→ Volyn Lutsk (loan)	1	(0)
2010	→ Belshina Bobruisk (loan)	9	(1)
2011–2012	Zirka Kirovohrad	22	(3)
2012	Obolon Kyiv	14	(2)
2013–2014	Sumy	30	(2)
2014–2015	Nyva Ternopil	26	(3)
2016	Neman Grodno	11	(0)
2017	Gomel	8	(0)
2017–2018	Sumy	21	(2)
- * Club domestic league appearances and goals as of 31 May 2018

Taras Duray (last name also spelled Duraj, born 31 July 1984) is a Ukrainian former professional football player.

== Career ==
In April 2019 the player (and his last club FC Sumy) was banned from professional football by the Ukrainian Football Federation due to match fixing by players of FC Sumy.
