= Serhiy Romanyshyn =

Ukrainian footballer (born 1975)

Serhiy Romanishyn
Personal information
- Full name: Serhiy Romanishyn
- Date of birth: 3 September 1975 (age 51)
- Place of birth: Kalush, Ivano-Frankivsk Oblast, Ukraine
- Height: 1.86 m (6 ft 1 in)
- Position: Defender

Senior career*
Years	Team	Apps	(Gls)
1992	FC Skala Stryi	20	(1)
1992–1994	FC Karpaty Lviv	26	(0)
1993	→ FC Boryspil (loan)	16	(0)
1994–1996	Kremin Kremenchuk	31	(1)
1995	→ Hazovyk Komarno (loan)	4	(0)
1996	Fakel Ivano-Frankivsk	5	(0)
1997–1998	Neftekhimik Nizhnekamsk	78	(0)
1999	FC Dynamo Lviv	24	(0)
2000–2002	Dinamo Tirana	71	(1)
2003	Vllaznia Shkodër	9	(0)
2003–2004	Besa Kavajë	22	(0)
2004–2005	FC Hazovyk-Skala Stryi	40	(0)
2006	Shkumbini Peqin	13	(0)
2006	Dinamo Tirana	4	(0)
2007	Skënderbeu Korçë		(0)
- * Club domestic league appearances and goals as of 1 January 2014

Serhiy Romanishyn (born 3 September 1975) is a former Ukrainian football player. He was the first Ukrainian footballer to play in the Albanian Superliga and was also the first to win the 2002 league title in Albania with Dinamo Tirana.
