= Bohdan Samardak =

Ukrainian footballer (born 1963)

Personal information
- Full name: Bohdan Mykolayovych Samardak
- Date of birth: 25 March 1963 (age 63)
- Place of birth: Vankovychi, Lviv Oblast, Soviet Union (now Ukraine)
- Height: 1.73 m (5 ft 8 in)
- Position: Striker

Senior career*
Years	Team	Apps	(Gls)
1984	Torpedo Lutsk	35	(4)
1986–1988	Avanhard Rivne	115	(47)
1989	Metalurh Zaporizhzhia	25	(2)
1990	Avanhard Rivne	36	(11)
1990–1993	Chemlon Humenné		(10)
1993–1994	Veres Rivne	60	(6)
1995–1996	Bukovyna Chernivtsi	39	(8)
1996–1998	Nyva Ternopil	62	(2)
1999	Polissya Zhytomyr	31	(2)
2002	Lokomotyv Zdolbuniv (amateurs)	2	(1)

Managerial career
- 2012–2014: Nyva Ternopil (assistant)
- 2014–2015: Nyva Ternopil (interim)
- 2015–2016: Bukovyna Chernivtsi (assistant)
- 2017–2019: Malynsk (amateurs)
- 2019: Malynsk (vice-president)
- 2021: Veres Rivne (youth)
- * Club domestic league appearances and goals

Bohdan Mykolayovych Samardak (Ukrainian: Богдан Миколайович Самардак; born 25 March 1963) is a Ukrainian professional football coach and a former player.

Samardak after retiring as footballer became a manager in some amateur clubs. After becoming of the assistant coach in Nyva Ternopil, in March 2014 he was appointed as the interim coach for this club in Ukrainian First League.
