= Eduard Valenko =

Ukrainian footballer and referee

Personal information
- Full name: Eduard Anatoliyovych Valenko
- Date of birth: 21 February 1960 (age 66)
- Place of birth: Lviv, Ukrainian SSR, Soviet Union
- Height: 1.77 m (5 ft 10 in)
- Position: Forward

Senior career*
Years	Team	Apps	(Gls)
1979–1981	FC Karpaty Lviv	15	(0)
1982	FC Podillya Khmelnytskyi	41	(11)
1983	FC Nyva Berezhany	41	(7)
1984	SKA Karpaty Lviv	5	(0)
1984–1988	FC Podillya Khmelnytskyi	181	(60)
1989–1990	FC Krystal Kherson	82	(28)
1991	FC Zaria Bălți	39	(12)
1992	FC Halychyna Drohobych	16	(2)
1992	FC Sokil–LORTA Lviv	1	(0)
1993	FC Lviv	11	(8)
1993–1995	FC Karpaty Lviv	49	(9)
1995–1996	Äppelbo AIK	10	(36)
1996–1997	FC Tsementnyk–Khorda Mykolaiv	22	(7)
- * Club domestic league appearances and goals

Eduard Valenko (Ukrainian: Едуард Анатолійович Валенко; born 21 February 1960) is a former Ukrainian football forward and football referee (2000–2008).
