= Andriy Pokladok =

Ukrainian footballer (born 1971)

Personal information
- Full name: Andriy Yaroslavovych Pokladok
- Date of birth: 21 June 1971 (age 55)
- Place of birth: Yavoriv, Ukrainian SSR
- Height: 1.74 m (5 ft 8 1/2 in)
- Position: Striker

Youth career
- Yavoriv sports school

Senior career*
Years	Team	Apps	(Gls)
1992	FC Skala Stryi	23	(7)
1992–1997	FC Karpaty Lviv	130	(45)
1993	→ FC Skala Stryi (loan)	8	(0)
1997–1999	FC Metalurh Donetsk	33	(7)
1997	→ FC Metalurh-2 Donetsk	5	(1)
1999–2002	FC Karpaty Lviv	56	(9)
1999–2001	→ FC Karpaty-2 Lviv	16	(3)
2001	→ FC Karpaty-3 Lviv	3	(1)
2002	FC Prykarpattia Ivano-Frankivsk	12	(3)
2002–2003	FC Oleksandriya	21	(1)
2003–2004	FC Nyva Vinnytsia	26	(4)
2004–2006	FC Rava Rava-Ruska	43	(11)

Managerial career
- 2007–????: FC Halychyna Lviv
- * Club domestic league appearances and goals

Andriy Yaroslavovych Pokladok (Ukrainian: Андрій Ярославович Покладок; born 21 June 1971) is a Ukrainian retired professional footballer.
