= Oleksandr Kovalenko (footballer) =

Ukrainian footballer (1976-2010)

Personal information
- Full name: Oleksandr Oleksandrovych Kovalenko
- Date of birth: 24 March 1976
- Place of birth: Artemivsk, Ukrainian SSR
- Date of death: 21 December 2010 (aged 34)
- Place of death: Dnipropetrovsk, Ukraine
- Height: 1.81 m (5 ft 11 in)
- Position: Midfielder

Senior career*
| Years | Team | Apps | (Gls) |
| 1993 | Metalurh Kostyantynivka | 21 | (1) |
| 1994–1996 | Shakhtar Makiivka | 87 | (15) |
| 1996–1998 | Dnipro Dnipropetrovsk | 40 | (4) |
| 1997 | → Dnipro-2 Dnipropetrovsk | 4 | (0) |
| 1998–1999 | Shakhtar Donetsk | 4 | (0) |
| 1998–1999 | → Shakhtar-2 Donetsk | 27 | (2) |
| 1999–2003 | Metalurh Donetsk | 55 | (2) |
| 2002–2003 | → Metalurh-2 Donetsk | 5 | (0) |
| 2003–2004 | Kryvbas Kryvyi Rih | 16 | (0) |
| 2004 | → Kryvbas-2 Kryvyi Rih | 3 | (1) |
| Total | | 262 | (25) |

International career
| 1997 | Ukraine U21 | 4 | (0) |
- * Club domestic league appearances and goals

Oleksandr Oleksandrovych Kovalenko (Ukrainian: Олександр Олександрович Коваленко; 24 March 1976 – 21 December 2010) was a Ukrainian professional footballer and later a football referee.

== Career ==
Kovalenko made his professional debut in the Ukrainian Second League in 1993 for FC Metalurh Kostyantynivka, after which he moved to the ranks of "Bazhanovets" from Makiivka (later the club changed its name to "Shakhtar"). In the Makiivka club, Kovalenko quickly became one of the leading players, on whom the team's game was based. After his initial professional stint he played for different Ukrainian Premier League clubs.

At the beginning of the 1996/97 season, the young midfielder was invited to the FC Dnipro. In the same season, Kovalenko achieved the greatest success with the Dnipro team, becoming a finalist in the 1996/97 Ukrainian Cup (the footballer himself played only 2 minutes in the final match against FC Shakhtar). In the 1997/98 season, Oleksandr was one of the key players of Dnipro, having played 25 matches and scoring three goals. Kovalenko played four matches for the Ukraine national under-21 football team in 1997. The following season, Kovalenko started as part of Shakhtar Donetsk, but things were clearly not going well for him in the new team. The midfielder was satisfied mainly with performances in the second team of the "miners", instead he played only four matches in the higher league. The situation changed radically the following year, after Oleksandr Kovalenko decided to transfer to FC Metalurh. Along with the playing experience, new achievements came - in the 2001/02 season, Metalurh won the bronze medal of the national championship. However, in the following season, Kovalenko almost did not appear on the field, so everything was going to change the team.

The footballer spent the first half of the 2003/04 season in his new club, Kryvyi Rih's Kryvbas, quite confidently, but after the winter break he stopped getting into the squad and in June 2004 has retired.

In 2006 Kovalenko worked as a football referee, serving matches first in regional and then all-Ukrainian amateur competitions. In 2009, as an assistant referee of the second category, he gained the right to referee matches of the Second League teams.

On 21 December 2010, the former footballer committed suicide by jumping out of the window of his own apartment in Dnipropetrovsk

== Death ==
On 21 December 2010, Kovalenko committed suicide by jumping from his apartment.
