= 1979 KFK competitions (Ukraine) =

KFK competitions
- Season: 1979
- Champions: Shakhtar Kadiivka

The 1979 KFK competitions in Ukraine were part of the 1979 Soviet KFK football competitions that were conducted in the Soviet Union. It was 15th season of the KFK in Ukraine since its introduction in 1964. The winner eventually qualified to the 1980 Soviet Second League.

== First stage ==
=== Group 1 ===
Pos	Team	Pld	W	D	L	GF	GA	GD	Pts
1	Karpaty Bushtyna	20	13	2	5	29	18	+11	28
2	Sokil Lviv	20	10	7	3	27	13	+14	27
3	Vatra Ternopil	20	10	5	5	23	12	+11	25
4	Shakhtar Chervonohrad	20	9	4	7	34	22	+12	22
5	Urozhai Kolchyno	20	9	2	9	24	22	+2	20
6	Sluch Krasyliv	20	9	2	9	24	29	−5	20
7	Prohres Berdychiv	20	8	4	8	20	20	0	20
8	Elektron Zbarazh	20	6	4	10	19	34	−15	16
9	Prylad Lutsk	20	5	6	9	14	26	−12	16
10	Khimik Kalush	20	5	3	12	23	31	−8	13
11	Vodnyk Rovno	20	3	7	10	22	32	−10	13

Source: ukr-football.org.ua

=== Group 2 ===
Pos	Team	Pld	W	D	L	GF	GA	GD	Pts
1	Khimik Drohobych	20	14	4	2	34	14	+20	32
2	Nyva Pidhaitsi	20	13	4	3	41	17	+24	30
3	Intehral Vinnytsia	20	11	3	6	33	17	+16	25
4	Sluch Berezne	20	10	5	5	31	20	+11	25
5	Naftovyk Dolyna	20	10	3	7	37	36	+1	23
6	Refryzherator Fastiv	20	9	2	9	16	20	−4	20
7	LVVPU Lviv	20	8	4	8	24	17	+7	20
8	Elektrovymiriuvach Zhytomyr	20	6	3	11	28	36	−8	15
9	Siret Storozhynets	20	4	3	13	16	25	−9	11
10	Karpaty Kuty	20	3	4	13	11	38	−27	10
11	Metalurh Starokostiantyniv	20	2	5	13	14	45	−31	9

Source: ukr-football.org.ua

=== Group 3 ===
Pos	Team	Pld	W	D	L	GF	GA	GD	Pts
1	Radyst Kirovohrad	18	11	3	4	33	12	+21	25
2	Frehat Pervomaisk	18	10	5	3	36	16	+20	25
3	Avanhard Derhachi	18	9	4	5	27	17	+10	22
4	Vostok Kyiv	18	6	9	3	15	14	+1	21
5	Yatran Kirovohrad	18	7	4	7	19	23	−4	18
6	Bilshovyk Kyiv	18	6	5	7	16	18	−2	17
7	Promin Chernihiv	18	5	6	7	17	16	+1	16
8	Avanhard Lozova	18	4	6	8	22	35	−13	14
9	Sputnik Poltava	18	5	3	10	21	19	+2	13
10	Frunzenets Sumy	18	2	5	11	16	42	−26	9

Source: ukr-football.org.ua

=== Group 4 ===
Pos	Team	Pld	W	D	L	GF	GA	GD	Pts
1	Kolos Pavlohrad	20	16	3	1	29	5	+24	35
2	Mayak Kharkiv	20	16	1	3	41	13	+28	33
3	Okean Mykolaiv	20	12	3	5	22	8	+14	27
4	Tytan Vilnohirsk	20	10	2	8	24	14	+10	22
5	Arsenal Kyiv	20	7	6	7	17	18	−1	20
6	Krystal Yahotyn	20	6	6	8	16	19	−3	18
7	Rubin Piskivka	20	6	3	11	16	37	−21	15
8	Shakhtar Oleksandriya	20	5	4	11	18	26	−8	14
9	Lokomotyv Znamianka	20	5	4	11	12	29	−17	14
10	Lokomotyv Smila	20	5	3	12	15	25	−10	13
11	Kolos Zolochiv	20	4	1	15	15	31	−16	9

Source: ukr-football.org.ua

=== Group 5 ===
Pos	Team	Pld	W	D	L	GF	GA	GD	Pts
1	Enerhiya Nova Kakhovka	22	18	3	1	59	13	+46	39
2	Tytan Armyansk	22	17	0	5	57	20	+37	34
3	ZKL Dnipropetrovsk	22	9	8	5	36	23	+13	26
4	Kolos Skadovsk	22	9	5	8	34	40	−6	23
5	Transformator Zaporizhia	22	9	4	9	28	33	−5	22
6	Budivelnyk Yalta	22	7	7	8	28	32	−4	21
7	Enerhiya Berdiansk	22	8	4	10	25	25	0	20
8	Zavod Oktianrskoi Revolutsii Odesa	22	7	5	10	20	32	−12	19
9	Sudnoremontnyk Illichivsk	22	7	5	10	17	24	−7	19
10	Naftovyk Kherson	22	6	5	11	28	37	−9	17
11	Spartak Melitopol	22	6	0	16	23	52	−29	12
12	Meteor Simferopol	22	3	6	13	18	41	−23	12

Source: ukr-football.org.ua

=== Group 6 ===
Pos	Team	Pld	W	D	L	GF	GA	GD	Pts
1	Shakhtar Stakhanov	20	13	5	2	34	16	+18	31
2	Kirovets Makiivka	20	11	6	3	27	11	+16	28
3	Shakhtobudivnyk Donetsk	20	9	8	3	36	18	+18	26
4	Metalurh Kupiansk	20	8	9	3	21	12	+9	25
5	Press Dnipropetrovsk	20	10	4	6	26	15	+11	24
6	Shakhtar Sverdlovsk	20	7	6	7	16	18	−2	20
7	Avanhard Kryvyi Rih	20	4	9	7	10	22	−12	17
8	Monolit Donetsk	20	4	8	8	17	26	−9	16
9	Komunarets Komunarsk	20	4	7	9	21	27	−6	15
10	Khimik Severodonetsk	20	3	4	13	14	34	−20	10
11	Bliuminh Kramatorsk	20	3	2	15	8	31	−23	8

Source: ukr-football.org.ua

== Final ==
Pos	Team	Pld	W	D	L	GF	GA	GD	Pts	Promotion
1	Shakhtar Kadiivka	5	2	3	0	8	5	+3	7	Promoted to Second League
2	Enerhiya Nova Kakhovka	5	2	2	1	10	7	+3	6	
3	Khimik Drohobych	5	2	2	1	6	6	0	6	
4	Kolos Pavlohrad	5	1	2	2	3	4	−1	4	
5	Radyst Kirovohrad	5	1	2	2	4	7	−3	4	
6	Karpaty Bushyna	5	1	1	3	9	11	−2	3	

Source: ukr-football.org.ua

== See also ==
- 1979 Football Cup of Ukrainian SSR among KFK
