= Oleksandr Rolevych =

Ukrainian footballer

Personal information
- Full name: Oleksandr Heorhiovych Rolevych
- Date of birth: 16 March 1965 (age 61)
- Place of birth: Odessa, Ukrainian SSR
- Height: 1.83 m (6 ft 0 in)
- Position: Defender

Youth career
- FC Chornomorets Odesa

Senior career*
Years	Team	Apps	(Gls)
1982–1984	FC Chornomorets Odesa	0	(0)
1985–1986	SKA Odessa	52	(0)
1987–1988	FC Nistru Chişinău	73	(0)
1989	FC Shakhtar Donetsk	12	(0)
1990	FC Nistru Chişinău	36	(0)
1991–1992	SC Odesa	39	(0)
1992	FC Chornomorets-2 Odesa	0	(0)
1992–1993	FC Kryvbas Kryvyi Rih	13	(0)
1993	FC Veres Rivne	12	(0)
1993–1994	FC Temp Shepetivka	13	(0)
1995–1996	FC Baltika Kaliningrad	37	(0)
1996–1997	FC Kuban Krasnodar	47	(1)
1998	FC Nosta Novotroitsk	25	(1)
2000	FC Shakhter-Ispat-Karmet	4	(0)
2001–2002	FC Tyras-2500 Bilhorod-Dnistrovskyi		
2002	FC IRIK Odesa		
2003	FC Tyras-2500 Bilhorod-Dnistrovskyi		
- * Club domestic league appearances and goals

Oleksandr Heorhiovych Rolevych (Ukrainian: Олександр Георгійович Ролевич; born 16 March 1965 in Odessa) is a former Ukrainian football player.
