= Spartakiad of the Peoples of the USSR =

Recurring sporting events in the Soviet Union

Spartakiad of Peoples of the USSR
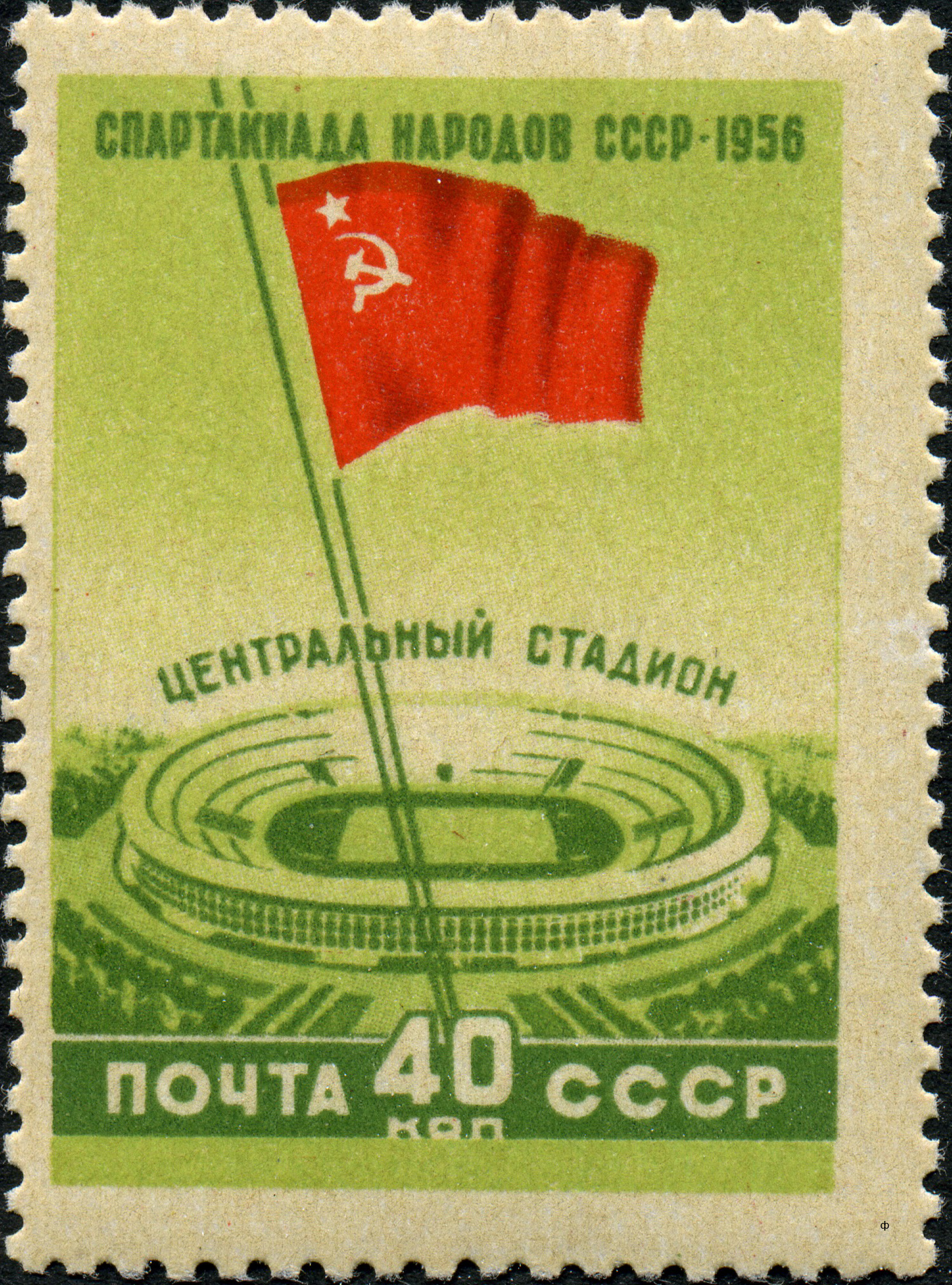
- Stamp marking the 1956 Spartakiad in Moscow
- Purpose: National qualifiers
- Frequency: Every 4 years
- Inaugurated: 1956
- Most recent: 1991
- Headquarters: Moscow, Russian SFSR, Soviet Union

The Spartakiad of Peoples of the USSR (Russian: Спартакиада народов СССР, Spartakiada narodov SSSR) were mass multi-event competitions in the Soviet Union in 1956–1991, descendants of the 1928 All-Union Spartakiad that took place in Moscow. The competitions were designed to be conducted between constituent union republics of the Soviet Union, but the Russian SFSR was always represented by three teams, the RSFSR itself as a whole along with separate teams from its main two cities, Moscow and Leningrad. The Moscow team was the most successful performer at the Spartakiad of Peoples of the USSR.

Summer editions were always held in Moscow and winter editions held four times in Sverdlovsk, twice in Krasnoyarsk and once in Kiev. There were ten summer Spartakiads and seven winter Spartakiads.

== Background ==
In 1952, the Soviet Union decided to join the Olympic movement, and international Spartakiads ceased, but the term continued to exist for internal sports events in the Soviet Union of different levels, from local up to the Spartakiad of the Peoples of the USSR. The latter event was held twice in four years: Winter Spartakiad and Summer Spartakiad.

The first Soviet Spartakiad was held in 1956. Until 1975, all summer finals were held in Moscow, later in some other cities throughout the Soviet Union (though most events were still held in Moscow). The winter finals were often held in Sverdlovsk.

=== List of Spartakiades of Peoples of USSR ===
- Summer (1956, 1959, 1963, 1967, 1971, 1975, 1979, 1983, 1986, 1991)
- Winter (1962, 1966, 1974, 1978, 1982, 1986, 1990)

=== Summer ===
Edition	Year	City	Nation	Start date	End date
I	1956	Moscow	Soviet Union	August	August
II	1959	Moscow	Soviet Union	August	August
III	1963	Moscow	Soviet Union	August	August
IV	1967	Moscow	Soviet Union	July	August
V	1971	Moscow	Soviet Union	August	August
VI	1975	Moscow	Soviet Union	March	August
VII	1979	Moscow	Soviet Union	August	August
VIII	1983	Moscow	Soviet Union	May	August
IX	1986	Moscow	Soviet Union	June	September
X	1991	Moscow	Soviet Union	March	September

=== Winter ===
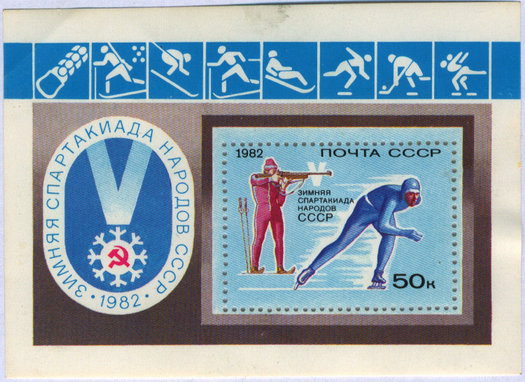
1982 Winter Spartakiad (post stamp)

Edition	Year	City	Nation	Start date	End date
I	1962	Sverdlovsk	Soviet Union	March	March
II	1966	Sverdlovsk, Gorky, Terskol and Kiev	Soviet Union	March	March
III	1974	Sverdlovsk	Soviet Union	March	March
IV	1978	Sverdlovsk	Soviet Union	March	March
V	1982	Krasnoyarsk	Soviet Union	4 March	16 March
VI	1986	Krasnoyarsk	Soviet Union	24 February	11 March
VII	1990	Kiev	Soviet Union	March	March

== Sports ==
=== Summer ===
Sports	1956	1959	1963	1967	1971	1975	1979	1983	1986	1991	Total
Archery					X	X	X	X	X	X	6
Athletics	X	X	X	X	X	X	X	X	X	X	10
Badminton									X	X	2
Basketball	X	X	X	X	X	X	X	X	X		9
Boxing	X	X	X	X	X	X	X	X	X	X	10
Chess		X	X	X		X	X	X	X	X	8
Cycling (track)	X			X	X	X	X	X	X	X	8
Cycling (road)	X	X	X	X	X	X	X	X	X	X	10
Diving	X	X	X	X	X	X	X	X	X	X	10
Equestrian	X	X	X	X	X	X	X	X	X	X	10
Fencing	X	X	X	X	X	X	X	X	X	X	10
Field hockey							X	X	X		3
Football	X						X	X	X		4
Gorodki									X	X	2
Gymnastics (acrobatic)									X	X	2
Gymnastics (artistic)	X	X	X	X	X	X	X	X	X	X	10
Gymnastics (rhythmic)							X	X	X	X	4
Gymnastics (trampolining)									X	X	2
Handball					X	X	X	X	X		5
Judo						X	X	X	X		4
Kayak and Canoe	X	X	X	X	X	X	X	X	X	X	10
Kettlebell lifting										X	1
Modern pentathlon	X	X	X	X	X	X	X	X	X		9
Motorcycle sport		X									1
Rowing			X	X	X	X	X	X	X	X	8
Sailing				X	X	X	X	X	X		6
Sambo					X	X	X	X	X	X	6
Shooting	X	X	X	X	X	X	X	X	X		9
Skeet shooting	X	X	X	X	X	X	X	X	X		9
Swimming	X	X	X	X	X	X	X	X	X	X	10
Synchronized swimming								X	X	X	3
Table tennis		X	X					X	X	X	5
Tennis	X	X	X	X		X	X	X	X	X	9
Underwater sports										X	1
Volleyball (men)	X	X	X	X	X	X	X	X	X	X	10
Volleyball (women)	X	X	X	X	X	X	X	X	X		9
Water polo	X	X	X	X	X	X	X	X	X		9
Water skiing									X		1
Weightlifting	X	X	X	X	X	X	X	X	X	X	10
Wrestling (freestyle)	X	X	X	X	X	X	X	X	X	X	10
Wrestling (Greco-Roman)	X	X	X	X	X	X	X	X	X	X	10

== Other competitions ==
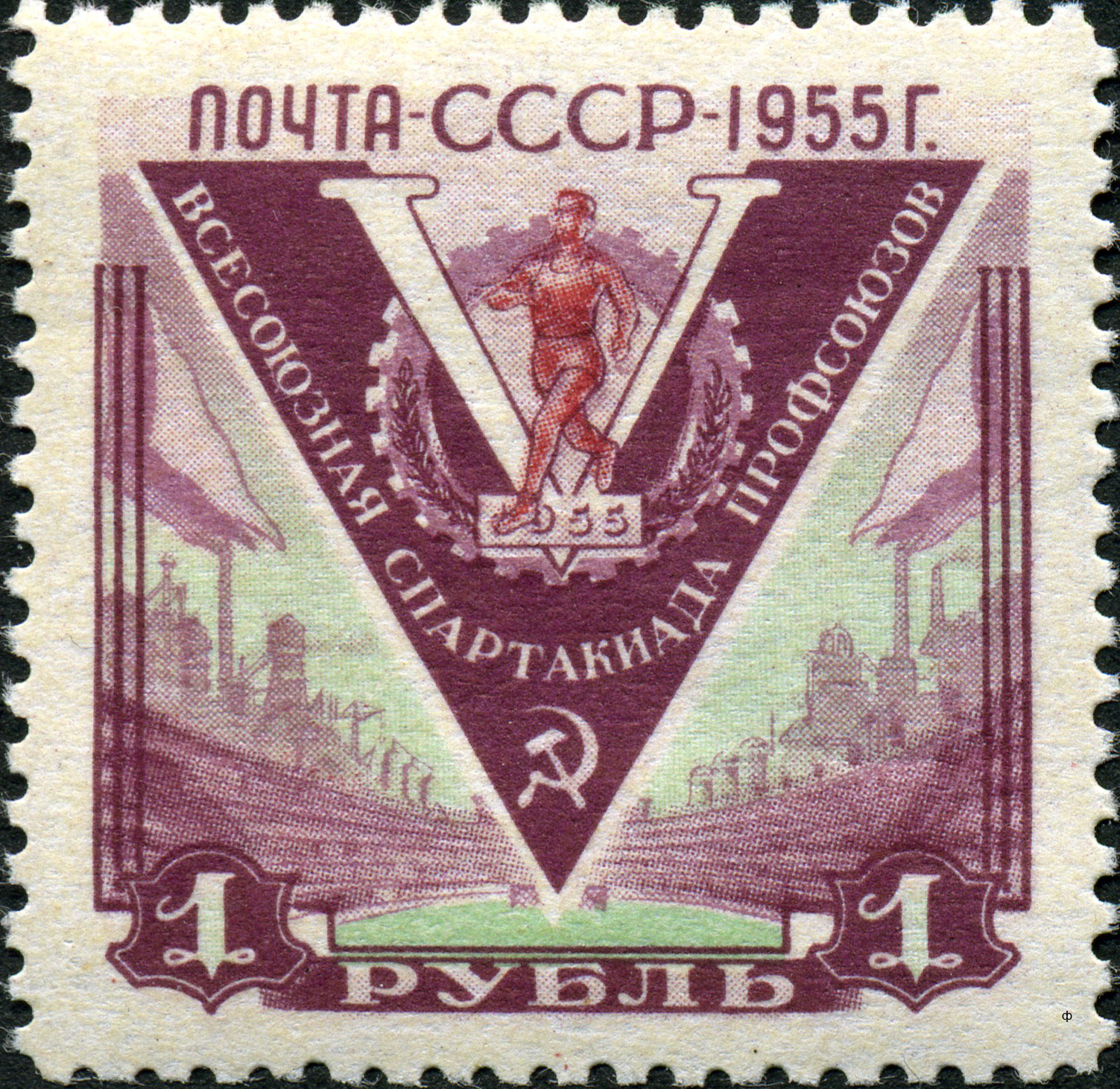
The 5th All-Union Spartakiad of Trade Unions in 1955

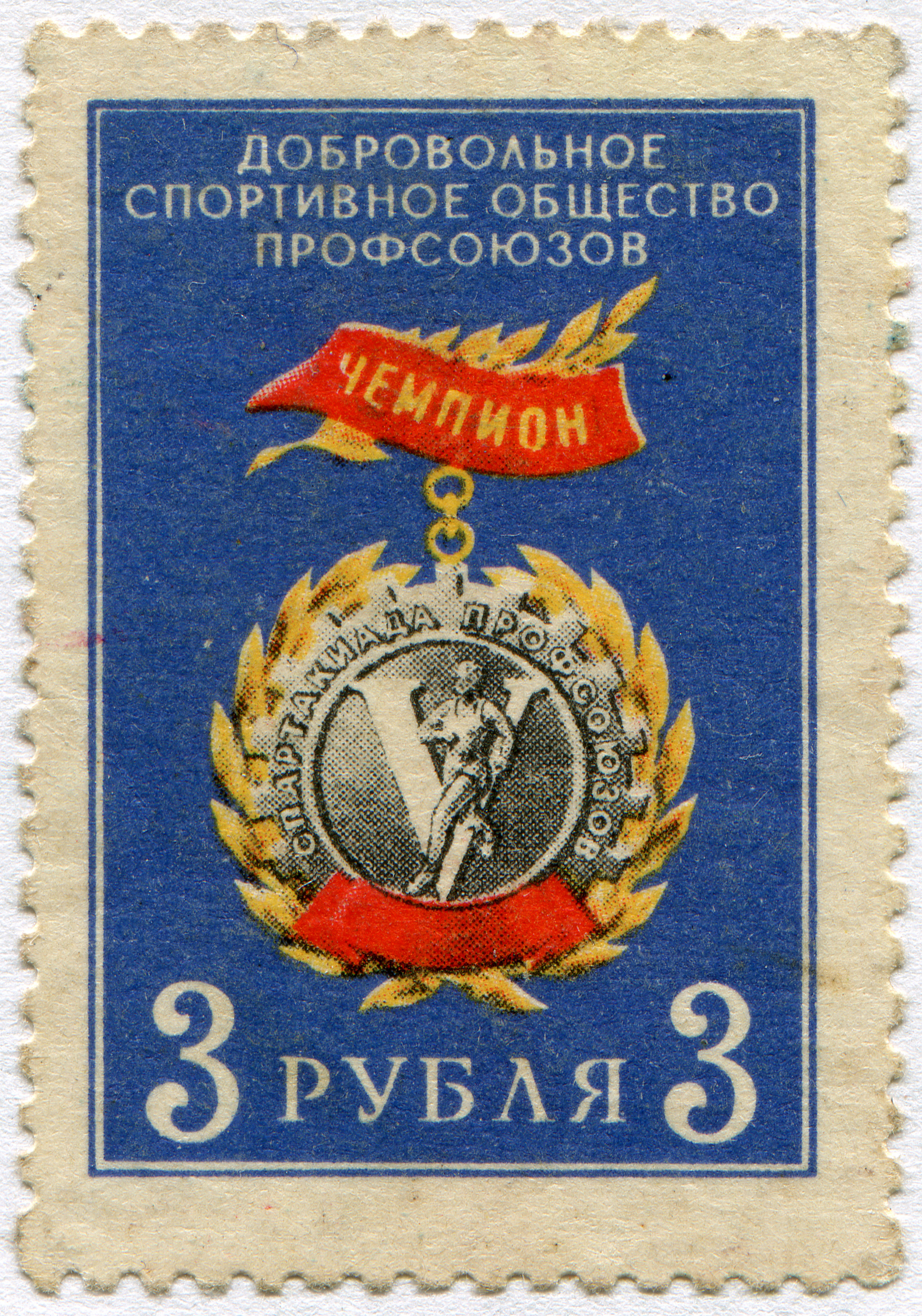
The 5th All-Union Spartakiad of Trade Unions in 1955
