= 1992–93 Vyshcha Liha =

2nd season of top-tier football league in Vyshcha Liha

Vyshcha Liha
- Season: 1992–93
- Champions: FC Dynamo Kyiv; 1st title
- Relegated: none
- Champions League: Dynamo Kyiv
- Cup Winners' Cup: Karpaty Lviv
- UEFA Cup: Dnipro Dnipropetrovsk
- Matches: 240
- Goals: 562 (2.34 per match)
- Top goalscorer: (17) Serhiy Husiev (Chornomorets)
- Biggest home win: Dynamo 6–0 Veres; Metalist 6–0 Zoria; Bukovyna 6–0 Kremin
- Biggest away win: Tavria 0–5 Dynamo; Bukovyna 0–5 Dynamo
- Highest scoring: Karpaty 4–3 Chornomorets; Shakhtar 6–1 Volyn
- Highest attendance: 40,000 – Dnipro–Dynamo
- Average attendance: High - Dynamo Kyiv (8,990), Low - Tavriya Simferopol (3,706)

The 1992–93 Vyshcha Liha season was the second since its establishment. Tavriya Simferopol were the defending champions, having won their 1st national league title in history. A total of sixteen teams participated in the competition, fourteen of them contested the 1992 season while the remaining two were promoted from the Ukrainian First League.

The competition began on August 15, 1992, with four games finishing on June 20, 1993. The competition was suspended for the winter break on November 22, 1992, and resumed on March 14, 1993.

On June 20, 1993 Dynamo Kyiv earned their first Ukrainian title with a 4–1 away victory over Kremin Kremenchuk. The Kyivan club was declared a champion by the goal difference as both Dynamo and Dnipro finished equal on points. The teams met just three rounds before the end in Dnipropetrovsk where Dnipro was victorious by a minimum margin thanks to the goal of Yuriy Maksymov.

Anatoliy Puzach was replaced as the coach of Dynamo Kyiv following its disastrous rendezvous with Belgian Anderlecht yielding it 2-7 on an aggregate and losing at home 0-3.

== Teams ==
=== Promotions ===
- Veres Rivne, the champion of the 1992 Ukrainian First League (Group A) – (debut)
- Kryvbas Kryvyi Rih, the champion of the 1992 Ukrainian First League (Group B) – (debut)

Kryvbas is a multi-times champion of the Championship of the Ukrainian SSR.

No relegation at the end of the season as the league was scheduled to be expanded to 18 participants.

Locations of teams home grounds in Ukrainian Premier League 1992-93

=== Stadiums ===
Rank	Stadium	Place	Club	Capacity	Notes
1	Respublikanskyi	Kyiv	Dynamo Kyiv	100,062	
2	Tsentralnyi Chornomorskoho Paroplavstva	Odesa	Chornomorets Odesa	34,362	
3	Avanhard	Luhansk	Zorya Luhansk	32,243	
4	Tsentralnyi Shakhtar	Donetsk	Shakhtar Donetsk	31,718	
5	Metalist	Kharkiv	Metalist Kharkiv	30,000	
6	Metalurh	Kryvyi Rih	Kryvbas Kryvyi Rih	29,734	
7	Ukraina	Lviv	Karpaty Lviv	28,051	
8	Meteor	Dnipro	FC Dnipro	24,381	
9	Avanhard	Rivne	Veres Rivne	20,000	
10	RSC Lokomotyv	Simferopol	Tavriya Simferopol	19,978	
11	Tsentralnyi miskyi	Ternopil	Nyva Ternopil	15,150	
12	AT AvtoZAZ	Zaporizhzhia	Torpedo Zaporizhzhia	15,000	
13	Avanhard	Lutsk	Volyn Lutsk	12,080	
14	Bukovyna	Chernivtsi	Bukovyna Chernivtsi	12,000	
15	Dnipro	Kremenchuk	FC Kremin Kremenchuk	11,300	
16	Metalurh	Zaporizhzhia	Metalurh Zaporizhzhia	11,883	

== Managers ==
Club	Coach	Replaced Coach(es)
FC Dynamo Kyiv	(Ukraine) Mykhailo Fomenko	(Ukraine) Anatoliy Puzach (Ukraine) Yozhef Sabo
FC Dnipro Dnipropetrovsk	(Ukraine) Mykola Pavlov	
FC Chornomorets Odesa	(Ukraine) Viktor Prokopenko	
FC Shakhtar Donetsk	(Ukraine) Valery Yaremchenko	
FC Metalist Kharkiv	(Uzbekistan) Sergei Dotsenko	(Ukraine) Leonid Tkachenko (Ukraine) Viktor Aristov
FC Karpaty Lviv	(Ukraine) Myron Markevych	
FC Metalurh Zaporizhzhia	(Latvia) Janis Skredelis	(Ukraine) Ihor Nadein 15 games
FC Kryvbas Kryvyi Rih	(Ukraine) Ihor Nadein	(Ukraine) Volodymyr Sryzhevskyi (Ukraine) Valentyn Laktionov
FC Kremin Kremenchuk	(Russia) Boris Streltsov	
SC Tavriya Simferopol	(Ukraine) Anatoliy Zayaev	
FC Volyn Lutsk	(Ukraine) Roman Pokora	
FC Bukovyna Chernivtsi	(Ukraine) Oleksandr Pavlenko	
FC Torpedo Zaporizhzhia	(Ukraine) Viktor Matviyenko	(Ukraine) Yevhen Lemeshko
FC Nyva Ternopil	(Ukraine) Leonid Buriak	(Ukraine) Leonid Koltun
FC Zorya-MALS	(Ukraine) Anatoliy Kuksov	
FC Veres Rivne	(Ukraine) Mykhailo Dunets	(Ukraine) Viktor Nosov (Belarus) Vasiliy Kurilov

=== Managerial changes ===
Team	Outgoing head coach	Manner of departure	Date of vacancy	Table	Incoming head coach	Date of appointment	Table
FC Bukovyna Chernivtsi	(Ukraine) Yukhym Shkolnykov			pre-season	(Ukraine) Oleksandr Pavlenko		pre-season
FC Kremin Kremenchuk	(Ukraine) Volodymyr Lozynskyi			pre-season	(Russia) Boris Streltsov		pre-season
FC Volyn Lutsk	(Ukraine) Myron Markevych			pre-season	(Ukraine) Roman Pokora		pre-season
FC Karpaty Lviv	(Ukraine) Stepan Yurchyshyn			pre-season	(Ukraine) Myron Markevych		pre-season
FC Kryvbas Kryvyi Rih	(Ukraine) Volodymyr Sryzhevskyi		October 12, 1992		(Ukraine) Valentyn Laktionov	October 12, 1992	
FC Veres Rivne	(Ukraine) Viktor Nosov		October 12, 1992		(Belarus) Vasiliy Kurilov	October 12, 1992	
FC Dynamo Kyiv	(Ukraine) Anatoliy Puzach	sacked	November 10, 1992	2	(Ukraine) Yozhef Sabo	November 10, 1992	2
FC Metalist Kharkiv	(Ukraine) Leonid Tkachenko				(Ukraine) Viktor Aristov		
FC Metalurh Zaporizhzhia	(Ukraine) Ihor Nadein				(Latvia) Janis Skredelis		
FC Veres Rivne	(Belarus) Vasiliy Kurilov				(Ukraine) Mykhailo Dunets		
FC Dynamo Kyiv	(Ukraine) Yozhef Sabo	replaced	February 1993	2	(Ukraine) Mykhailo Fomenko	February 1993	2
FC Nyva Ternopil	(Ukraine) Leonid Koltun				(Ukraine) Leonid Buriak		
FC Kryvbas Kryvyi Rih	(Ukraine) Valentyn Laktionov		March 15, 1993		(Ukraine) Ihor Nadein	March 15, 1993	
FC Torpedo Zaporizhzhia	(Ukraine) Yevhen Lemeshko		April 1, 1993		(Ukraine) Viktor Matviyenko	April 1, 1993	
FC Metalist Kharkiv	(Ukraine) Viktor Aristov		June 1, 1993		(Uzbekistan) Sergei Dotsenko	June 1, 1993	

== Qualification to European competitions for 1993–94 ==
- Following the agreement between UEFA, Russia and Ukraine, Russia inherited the 1992 European ranking of Soviet Union, while Ukraine was awarded a slot of defunct East Germany for the 1993–94 UEFA Cup. The Ukrainian Cup winner qualifies for the 1993–94 European Cup Winners' Cup qualifying round.

=== Qualified Teams ===
- During the 27th Round, Dynamo Kyiv qualified for European football for the 1993–94 season.
- After the 29th Round, Dnipro Dnipropetrovsk qualified for European football for the 1993–94 season.
- After the 30th Round, Karpaty Lviv qualified for the 1993–94 European Cup Winners' Cup, Dynamo qualified for the 1993–94 UEFA Champions League, Dnipro qualified for the 1993–94 UEFA Cup.

== League table ==
Pos	Team	Pld	W	D	L	GF	GA	GD	Pts	Qualification
1	Dynamo Kyiv (Note: Participant of the 1993 Ukrainian Cup Final) (C)	30	18	8	4	59	14	+45	44	Qualification to Champions League first round
2	Dnipro Dnipropetrovsk	30	18	8	4	51	20	+31	44	Qualification to UEFA Cup first round
3	Chornomorets Odesa	30	17	4	9	43	31	+12	38	
4	Shakhtar Donetsk	30	11	12	7	44	32	+12	34	
5	Metalist Kharkiv	30	12	7	11	37	34	+3	31	
6	Karpaty Lviv	30	10	10	10	37	38	−1	30	Qualification to Cup Winners' Cup qualifying round
7	Metalurh Zaporizhzhia	30	10	9	11	38	35	+3	29	
8	Kryvbas Kryvyi Rih	30	8	11	11	27	40	−13	27	
9	Kremin Kremenchuk	30	8	11	11	23	40	−17	27	
10	Tavriya Simferopol	30	11	4	15	30	39	−9	26	
11	Volyn Lutsk	30	10	6	14	37	54	−17	26	
12	Bukovyna Chernivtsi	30	9	8	13	27	32	−5	26	
13	Torpedo Zaporizhzhia	30	9	7	14	32	40	−8	25	
14	Nyva Ternopil	30	8	9	13	22	25	−3	25	
15	Zorya-MALS Luhansk	30	10	4	16	26	46	−20	24	
16	Veres Rivne	30	9	6	15	29	42	−13	24	

Source: uafootball.net.ua
Rules for classification: 1) Points; 2) Matches won; 3) Goal difference; 4) Goals scored; 5) Head-to-head points; 6) Head-to-head matches won; 7) Head-to-head goal difference; 8) Head-to-head goals scored.
(C) Champions
Notes:
- Dynamo Kyiv won its first championship title by earning the 18th win of the season in the Round 30 away against Kremin Kremenchuk at Dnipro Stadium, Kremenchuk on June 20, 1993.

== Results ==
Home \ Away	BUC	CHO	DNI	DYK	KAR	KRE	KRY	MKH	MZA	NVT	SHA	TAV	TZA	VER	VOL	ZOR
Bukovyna Chernivtsi	—	2–0	0–0	0–5	4–2	6–0	0–0	2–0	0–1	0–0	0–1	2–0	0–1	1–0	1–1	2–1
Chornomorets Odesa	1–2	—	1–0	1–1	4–0	3–0	1–0	3–0	1–0	1–0	1–2	1–0	2–1	1–0	3–1	2–1
Dnipro	5–1	3–1	—	1–0	1–0	2–0	0–0	2–1	4–1	3–1	3–1	3–0	3–1	4–1	2–0	4–0
Dynamo Kyiv	1–0	1–0	2–1	—	0–0	5–0	1–1	2–0	4–1	1–0	2–0	1–0	4–0	6–0	0–0	4–0
Karpaty Lviv	3–1	4–3	1–1	0–0	—	0–0	1–0	0–0	2–0	2–0	1–1	2–0	3–1	2–1	2–1	3–1
Kremin Kremenchuk	0–0	1–1	2–0	1–4	0–0	—	1–1	0–0	0–1	1–1	2–1	0–0	1–1	1–0	3–0	1–0
Kryvbas Kryvyi Rih	0–1	1–1	2–2	1–0	3–2	1–2	—	0–2	0–2	1–0	2–2	2–0	1–1	1–0	3–2	2–0
Metalist Kharkiv	1–0	1–1	1–0	1–1	2–1	2–0	2–0	—	1–4	1–0	1–3	1–1	3–2	3–0	2–1	6–0
Metalurh Zaporizhzhia	3–1	2–3	1–1	1–1	3–0	1–1	1–1	1–2	—	0–0	1–1	2–0	1–1	0–1	4–1	1–0
Nyva Ternopil	0–0	0–2	0–1	0–1	2–1	2–0	2–0	2–0	2–1	—	3–1	0–0	2–0	1–1	1–1	2–1
Shakhtar Donetsk	0–0	4–1	1–1	1–1	0–0	1–0	5–1	0–0	0–0	1–0	—	3–1	2–2	1–1	6–1	0–1
Tavriya Simferopol	1–0	0–1	0–1	0–5	0–0	-:+ (Note: The result of the Round 16 match was annulled and technical victory -:+ awarded for Kremin for participation in the match discqualified Yevhen Drahunov for Tavriya. The match originally ended with a 2–0 victory for Tavriya.)	5–0	2–1	2–0	1–0	3–1	—	2–1	3–2	2–0	2–1
Torpedo Zaporizhzhia	0–0	0–1	0–1	1–0	3–2	1–1	0–1	1–0	1–3	1–0	1–2	3–0	—	1–0	4–1	1–0
Veres Rivne	3–1	1–2	0–0	1–3	1–1	2–3	0–0	1–0	2–1	0–0	0–2	3–1	2–1	—	2–1	2–0
Volyn Lutsk	1–0	1–0	0–0	1–3	3–2	2–1	3–1	3–2	0–0	2–1	1–1	1–3	2–1	1–0	—	4–2
Zorya-MALS Luhansk	1–0	2–0	1–2	1–0	2–0	2–1	1–1	1–1	2–1	0–0	1–0	2–1	0–0	0–2	2–1	—

Source: uafootball.net.ua
Legend: Blue = home team win; Yellow = draw; Red = away team win.

=== Top goalscorers ===
Rank	Player	Club	Goals (Pen.)
1	(Ukraine) Serhiy Husyev	Chornomorets Odesa	17 (2)
2	(Ukraine) Viktor Leonenko	Dynamo Kyiv	16 (3)
3	(Ukraine) Ihor Nychenko	Kryvbas Kryvyi Rih	12 (2)
4	(Ukraine) Serhiy Atelkin	Shakhtar Donetsk	11
4	(Ukraine) Vadym Kolesnyk	Metalist Kharkiv	11
4	(Ukraine) Oleh Matviiv	Shakhtar Donetsk	11 (1)
4	(Ukraine) Talyat Sheikhametov	Tavriya Simferopol	11 (1)
8	(Ukraine) Roman Bondarenko	Torpedo Zaporizhzhia	10
9	(Ukraine) Volodymyr Dykyi	Volyn Lutsk	9 (2)
10	(Ukraine) Serhiy Shevchenko	Tavriya Simferopol	8
10	(Ukraine) Volodymyr Hashchyn	Volyn Lutsk	8
10	(Ukraine) Pavlo Shkapenko	Dynamo Kyiv	8
10	(Ukraine) Tymerlan Huseynov	Zorya-MALS Luhansk	8
10	(Ukraine) Anatoliy Mushchinka	Metalurh Zaporizhzhia	8
10	(Ukraine) Serhiy Konovalov	Dnipro Dnipropetrovsk	8
10	(Ukraine) Dmytro Topchiyev	Karpaty Lviv	8

=== Clean sheets ===
Rank	Player	Club	Clean sheets
1	(Ukraine) Oleh Suslov	Chornomorets Odesa	12
2	(Ukraine) Ihor Kutyepov	Dynamo Kyiv	11
3	(Ukraine) Oleksandr Pomazun	Metalist Kharkiv	10
3	(Ukraine) Dmytro Tyapushkin	Nyva Ternopil	10
5	(Ukraine) Bohdan Strontsitskyi	Karpaty Lviv	9
5	(Ukraine) Mykola Medin	FC Dnipro	9

== Medal squads ==
(league appearances and goals listed in brackets)

1. FC Dynamo Kyiv

Goalkeepers: Ihor Kutepov (19 / -8), Valdemaras Martinkenas (12 / -6).
Defenders: Oleh Luzhnyi (26 / 3), Serhiy Shmatovalenko (22 / 1), Andriy Annenkov (21 / 2), Vitaliy Ponomarenko (15), Anatoliy Demyanenko (14 / 1), Akhrik Tsveyba (12), Serhiy Zayets (11 / 1), Anatoliy Bezsmertny (9), Andriy Aleksanenkov (8), Mykola Zuyenko (8), Yuri Moroz (2).
Midfielders: Serhiy Kovalets (27 / 1), Serhii Rebrov (23 / 5), Yuriy Hritsyna (20 / 2), Serhiy Mizin (16 / 5), Volodymyr Sharan (16 / 1), Dmytro Topchiyev (14 / 7), Vyacheslav Khruslov (11 / 1), Igoris Pankratjevas (9 / 2), Pavlo Yakovenko (9 / 1), Stepan Betsa (8), Andriy Zavyalov (5 / 1), Ervand Sukiasian (3), Oleh Volotek (2), Viktor Byelkin (2).
Forwards: Viktor Leonenko (27 / 16), Pavlo Shkapenko (27 / 8), Vitaliy Mintenko (10 / 1).

Manager: Anatoliy Puzach (until November 10, 1992 (13 games)), Yozhef Sabo (end of first half (2 games)), Mykhailo Fomenko (since March 1993 (15 games)).

Transferred out during the season: Anatoliy Demyanenko (retired), Stepan Betsa (perished in car accident), Igoris Pankratjevas (to (Lithuania) Sakalas Siauliai), Pavlo Yakovenko (to (France) Sochaux), Mykola Zuyenko (to Prykarpattya), Oleh Volotek (to (Russia) Asmaral Moscow), Viktor Byelkin (to FC Boryspil), Yuri Moroz (to Veres Rivne).

2. FC Dnipro Dnipropetrovsk

Goalkeepers: Mykola Medin (19 / -10), Valeriy Horodov (10 / -8), Anatoliy Chistov (1 / -1), Ihor Moiseyev (1 / -1).
Defenders: Serhiy Bezhenar (28 / 6), Serhiy Diriavka (25 / 2), Dmytro Yakovenko (24 / 1), Oleg Chukhleba (22), Andriy Yudin (16), Serhiy Mamchur (3), Yevhen Yarovenko (3), Oleksiy Sasko (2), Dmytro Demyanenko (2).
Midfielders: Andriy Polunin (29 / 6), Yevhen Pokhlebayev (28 / 4), Yuriy Maksymov (26 / 5), Hennadiy Moroz (24 / 7), Oleksandr Zakharov (24 / 1), Kostyantyn Pavlyuchenko (22), Dmytro Mykhailenko (19 / 3), Volodymyr Bahmut (5), Oleksandr Palyanytsia (4 / 1).
Forwards: Serhiy Konovalov (29 / 8), Valentyn Moskvin (25 / 3), Serhiy Dumenko (21 / 4), Oleksandr Tyehayev (1).

Manager: Mykola Pavlov.

Transferred out during the season: Oleksiy Sasko (perished in car accident), Valeriy Horodov (to (Morocco) RS Settat), Ihor Moiseyev (to (Russia) Asmaral Moscow), Serhiy Mamchur (to (Russia) Asmaral Moscow), Oleksandr Palyanytsia (to Kryvbas Kryvyi Rih), Oleksandr Tyehayev (to Shakhtar Pavlohrad).

3. FC Chornomorets Odesa

Goalkeepers: Oleh Suslov (30 / -31).
Defenders: Yuriy Bukel (29), Dmytro Parfionov (28), Oleksandr Nikiforov (17 / 1), Serhiy Protsiuk (14), Oleksandr Bondarenko (13), Vitaliy Skysh (12 / 2), Yuriy Nikiforov (11), Sehiy Voronezhsky (8), Andriy Telesnenko (3 / 1).
Midfielders: Yuriy Sak (29), Kostiantyn Kulik (23 / 4), Viktor Yablonskyi (17 / 1), Ruslan Romanchuk (17), Ilya Tsymbalar (14 / 1), Andriy Lozovsky (11 / 1), Vyacheslav Yeremeyev (7).
Forwards: Oleh Kosheliuk (30 / 6), Serhiy Husiev (29 / 17), Vladimir Lebed (26 / 3), Oleksandr Shcherbakov (10 / 4), Vitaliy Parakhnevych (9 / 2).

Manager: Viktor Prokopenko.

Transferred out during the season: Ilya Tsymbalar (to (Russia) Spartak Moscow), Yuriy Nikiforov (to (Russia) Spartak Moscow), Andriy Telesnenko (to (Finland) Oulun Palloseura), Serhiy Husiev (to (Turkey) Trabzonspor).

Note: Players in italic are whose playing position is uncertain.

== See also ==
- Continental competitions: 1992-93 European Cup, 1992-93 European Cup Winners' Cup, 1992-93 UEFA Cup
- Domestic leagues: 1992-93 Ukrainian First League, 1992-93 Ukrainian Second League, 1992-93 Ukrainian Transitional League, 1992-93 Ukrainian Football Amateur League
- Domestic cups: 1992-93 Ukrainian Cup
