= 1993–94 Vyshcha Liha =

3rd season of top-tier football league in Vyshcha Liha

Vyshcha Liha
- Season: 1993–94
- Dates: 8 August 1993 – 19 June 1994; 29 November 1993 – 5 March 1994 (winter break)
- Champions: FC Dynamo Kyiv; 2nd title
- Relegated: FC Bukovyna Chernivtsi; FC Metalist Kharkiv
- Champions League: Dynamo Kyiv
- Cup Winners' Cup: Chornomorets Odesa
- UEFA Cup: Shakhtar Donetsk
- Top goalscorer: (18) Timerlan Huseinov (Chornomorets)
- Biggest home win: 7:0 Dnipro - Metalurh (Round 17)
- Biggest away win: 0:4 Zorya-MALS - Shakhtar (Round 15)
- Highest scoring: 7:1 Tariya - Metalist (Round 15)

1993–94 Vyshcha Liha was the third season of the Vyshcha Liha.

Last season the league champions Dynamo received a fierce competition from the Pavlov led Dnipro out of Dnipropetrovsk. The third season was promising to be even more exciting. Dynamo was going through some difficult times and before the start of the season, it was sold to Hryhoriy Surkis from Viktor Bezverkhyi.

The season started on August 8 with nine games of the first round. It finally was concluded on June 19. It was anticipated that at least four clubs would be really competing for the top title. At the end, it turned out the other way around. Dnipro has remarkably given up its positions, losing almost ten games. Chornomorets also did not pose any resistance to neither Dynamo or Shakhtar. However, the biggest surprise was the relegation of Metalist Kharkiv which won only six games. Metalurh Zaporizhzhia barely escaped relegation, partially due to their excellent game in Kharkiv where they manage to thrash the local Metalist 3:0. Three rounds before the end Dynamo was recognized as the champions. There was one technical loss (-:+) that was awarded again to SC Tavriya Simferopol when it was hosting FC Volyn Lutsk in the 32nd round on June 11, 1994, for fielding a suspended player Dzyubenko.

== Preseason changes ==
The league was expanded to 18 teams including the same 16 from the past season.

== Teams ==
=== Promotions ===
- Nyva Vinnytsia, the champion of the 1992–93 Ukrainian First League – (returning after a season absence)
- Temp Shepetivka, the runner-up of the 1992–93 Ukrainian First League – (returning after a season absence)

=== Location ===
Locations of teams home grounds in Ukrainian Premier League 1993-94

Rank	Stadium	Place	Club	Capacity	Notes
1	Respublikansky Stadion	Kyiv	Dynamo Kyiv	100,062	
2	Tsentralnyi Stadion BSS	Odesa	Chornomorets Odesa	43,000	
3	Avanhard	Luhansk	Zorya-MALS Luhansk	32,243	
4	Metalist	Kharkiv	Metalist Kharkiv	32,000	
5	Tsentralnyi Stadion "Shakhtar" Stadion Rudupravlinnia	Donetsk Komsomolske	Shakhtar Donetsk	31,545 ?	
6	Meteor	Dnipropetrovsk	Dnipro Dnipropetrovsk	30,000	
7	Metalurh UGOK Stadion	Kryvyi Rih	Kryvbas Kryvyi Rih	29,783 ?	
8	Ukraina	Lviv	Karpaty Lviv	28,051	
9	Lokomotyv	Simferopol	Tavriya Simferopol	26,000	
10	Avanhard	Rivne	Veres Rivne	25,000	
11	Metalurh	Zaporizhzhia	Metalurh Zaporizhzhia	25,000	
12	Lokomotyv	Vinnytsia	Nyva Vinnytsia	24,000	
13	Miskyi Stadion	Ternopil	Nyva Ternopil	17,000	
14	CJSC ZAZ Stadion	Zaporizhzhia	Torpedo Zaporizhzhia	15,000	
15	Bukovyna	Chernivtsi	Bukovyna Chernivtsi	12,000	
16	Dnipro	Kremenchuk	Kremin Kremenchuk	11,300	
17	Avanhard	Lutsk	Volyn Lutsk	10,792	
18	Temp	Shepetivka	Temp Shepetivka	8,000	

== Managers ==
Club	Coach	Replaced Coach
FC Dynamo Kyiv	(Ukraine) Yozhef Sabo	(Ukraine) Mykhailo Fomenko
FC Shakhtar Donetsk	(Ukraine) Valery Yaremchenko	
FC Chornomorets Odesa	(Ukraine) Viktor Prokopenko	
FC Dnipro Dnipropetrovsk	(Ukraine) Mykola Pavlov	
FC Karpaty Lviv	(Ukraine) Myron Markevych	
FC Kryvbas Kryvyi Rih	(Azerbaijan) Volodymyr Brukhtiy	(Ukraine) Ihor Nadein
FC Nyva Ternopil	(Ukraine) Leonid Buriak	
SC Tavriya Simferopol	(Ukraine) Anatoliy Zayaev	
FC Temp Shepetivka	(Ukraine) Leonid Tkachenko	
FC Nyva Vinnytsia	(Ukraine) Yukhym Shkolnykov	
FC Volyn Lutsk	(Ukraine) Roman Pokora	
FC Veres Rivne	(Ukraine) Vyacheslav Kobyletskyi	(Ukraine) Mykhailo Dunets
FC Torpedo Zaporizhzhia	(Ukraine) Ihor Nadein	(Ukraine) Viktor Matviyenko
FC Zorya-MALS	(Ukraine) Volodymyr Kobzarev	(Ukraine) Anatoliy Shakun
FC Kremin Kremenchuk	(Ukraine) Evhen Rudakov	(Russia) Boris Streltsov 8 games (Ukraine) Tiberiy Korponay 9 games
FC Metalurh Zaporizhzhia	(Ukraine) Anatoliy Kuksov	(Latvia) Janis Skredelis (Ukraine) Hryhoriy Vul
FC Bukovyna Chernivtsi	(Ukraine) Oleksandr Pavlenko	
FC Metalist Kharkiv	(Ukraine) Viktor Kamarzayev	(Ukraine) Oleksandr Dovbiy (Ukraine) Yevhen Lemeshko

== League table ==
Pos	Team	Pld	W	D	L	GF	GA	GD	Pts	Qualification or relegation
1	Dynamo Kyiv (C)	34	23	10	1	61	21	+40	56	Qualification to Champions League qualifying round
2	Shakhtar Donetsk	34	20	9	5	64	32	+32	49	Qualification to UEFA Cup qualifying round
3	Chornomorets Odesa (Note: Participant of the 1994 Ukrainian Cup Final)	34	20	8	6	52	23	+29	48	Qualification to Cup Winners' Cup first round
4	Dnipro Dnipropetrovsk	34	16	9	9	53	35	+18	41	
5	Karpaty Lviv	34	16	8	10	37	30	+7	40	
6	Kryvbas Kryvyi Rih	34	14	8	12	26	26	0	36	
7	Nyva Ternopil	34	13	10	11	44	26	+18	36	
8	Tavriya Simferopol	34	12	10	12	41	34	+7	34	
9	Temp Shepetivka	34	12	8	14	39	38	+1	32	
10	Nyva Vinnytsia	34	12	8	14	37	45	−8	32	
11	Volyn Lutsk	34	10	12	12	27	30	−3	32	
12	Veres Rivne	34	10	12	12	32	36	−4	32	
13	Torpedo Zaporizhzhia	34	9	10	15	27	39	−12	28	
14	Zorya-MALS Luhansk	34	10	6	18	24	46	−22	26	
15	Kremin Kremenchuk	34	9	8	17	26	39	−13	26	
16	Metalurh Zaporizhzhia	34	9	6	19	26	49	−23	24	
17	Bukovyna Chernivtsi (R)	34	7	6	21	25	51	−26	20	Relegated to Ukrainian First League
18	Metalist Kharkiv (R)	34	6	8	20	22	63	−41	20	Relegated to Ukrainian First League

Source: uafootball.net.ua
Rules for classification: 1st points; 2nd wins; 3rd goal difference
(C) Champions; (R) Relegated
Notes:
- Dynamo Kyiv won its second title at home against Metalist Kharkiv on June 7, 1994, earning its 20th win of the season at the Republican Stadium in Kyiv in front of 3,500 spectators.

== Results ==
Home \ Away	BUK	CHO	DNI	DYN	KAR	KRE	KRY	MET	MZA	NVT	NYV	SHA	TAV	TEM	TZA	VER	VOL	ZOR
Bukovyna Chernivtsi	—	0–1	0–1	0–3	3–2	1–0	2–0	4–0	2–0	0–0	0–0	1–2	1–2	2–1	0–1	1–1	1–0	0–0
Chornomorets Odesa	4–0	—	2–1	1–2	1–1	4–1	2–0	3–0	1–0	3–1	3–0	0–1	3–1	2–0	1–0	1–1	2–0	4–1
Dnipro	4–2	0–0	—	2–3	1–1	2–1	2–1	3–1	7–0	3–1	1–0	2–1	2–0	1–0	0–0	3–1	1–0	0–0
Dynamo Kyiv	3–1	2–0	2–0	—	2–1	1–1	3–0	2–0	3–0	1–0	3–1	1–1	1–1	0–0	4–1 (Note: The round 12 match Dynamo vs Torpedo was originally scheduled for October 24, but it was postponed to November 10.)	2–1	0–0	1–0
Karpaty Lviv	1–0	0–1	3–1	1–2	—	1–0	1–0	3–0	2–0	1–0	2–1	1–0	1–0	2–1	3–1	0–0	1–2	1–0
Kremin Kremenchuk	2–0	0–1	0–0	0–2	1–2	—	0–1	1–0	2–0	0–0	2–0	0–0	1–0	0–0	1–0	1–0	1–0	4–1
Kryvbas Kryvyi Rih	3–0	1–0	0–0	1–1	2–0	1–0	—	0–1	1–0	2–1	3–0	2–1	0–0	2–1	1–0	1–0	0–0	1–0
Metalist Kharkiv	1–1	1–2	1–1	1–2	0–1	3–2	1–0	—	0–3	0–0	0–2	1–1	0–0	1–1	2–1	2–1	1–1	0–2
Metalurh Zaporizhzhia	1–1	0–0 (Note: The round 12 match Metalurh vs Chornomorets was originally scheduled for October 24, but it was postponed to November 11.)	1–2	0–1	0–1	1–0	1–1	0–1	—	1–2	1–0	0–3	4–1	2–1	1–1	1–0	2–0	1–1
Nyva Ternopil	3–0	0–0	2–2	0–0	1–1	4–1	3–0	3–0	2–0	—	3–0	1–1	2–0	3–0	2–0	3–0	2–1	2–0
Nyva Vinnytsia	3–1	1–2	2–1	2–2	1–1	1–1	0–1	2–1	0–0	1–0	—	2–2	1–0	2–0	0–0	2–1	2–1	2–0
Shakhtar Donetsk	1–0	4–1	2–1	1–0	3–0	1–1	1–0	3–1	5–2	2–1	2–1	—	2–0	3–1 (Note: The round 26 match Shakhtar vs Temp was originally scheduled for April 30, but it was postponed to May 11.)	1–0	3–0	3–1	3–0
Tavriya Simferopol	3–1	0–0	1–0	2–4	2–0	3–0	2–0	7–1	1–0	1–1	2–2	1–1	—	2–1	3–0	1–1	-:+ (Note: The original score was 2:1 in favor of Tavriya, but it was changed since Tavriya fielded Hennadiy Dzyubenko, who was not eligible to play. Note that the administrative score did not have a numerical equivalent at that time.)	3–1
Temp Shepetivka	1–0	1–1	3–2	0–1	1–1	3–1	1–0	3–1	3–1	1–0	3–0	3–1	1–1	—	3–0	1–2	2–1	1–0
Torpedo Zaporizhzhia	2–0	1–0	1–1	0–0	1–1	2–0	0–0	3–0	1–2	1–0	1–3	3–3	0–1	2–1	—	1–1	1–0	1–0
Veres Rivne	1–0	1–2	2–1	0–3	0–0	2–0	1–1	4–0	0–1	0–0	3–2	2–0	0–0	0–0	1–0	—	0–0	2–1
Volyn Lutsk	2–0	0–0	1–2	1–3	1–0	1–1	0–0	0–0	2–0	1–0	2–0	2–2	1–0	0–0	2–0	1–1	—	2–1
Zorya-MALS Luhansk	2–0	1–4	0–3	1–1	1–0	1–0	1–0	1–0	1–0	2–1	0–1	0–4	1–0	1–0	1–1	1–2	1–1	—

Source: uafootball.net.ua
Legend: Blue = home team win; Yellow = draw; Red = away team win.

== Statistics ==
=== Top goalscorers ===
Rank	Player	Club	Goals (Pen.)
1	(Ukraine) Timerlan Huseinov	Chornomorets Odesa	18 (1)
2	(Ukraine) Oleh Matviiv	Shakhtar Donetsk	17 (5)
3	(Ukraine) Victor Leonenko	Dynamo Kyiv	15 (4)
4	(Ukraine) Oleh Mochulyak	Nyva Ternopil	14
5	(Ukraine) Serhii Konovalov	Dnipro Dnipropetrovsk	13
5	(Ukraine) Serhiy Skachenko	Temp Shepetivka	13
7	(Ukraine) Borys Finkel	Bukovyna Chernivtsi	12
7	(Ukraine) Serhiy Onopko	Shakhtar Donetsk	12
7	(Ukraine) Pavlo Shkapenko	Dynamo Kyiv	12
7	(Ukraine) Andriy Pokladok	Karpaty Lviv	12 (1)

=== Clean sheets ===
Rank	Player	Club	Clean sheets
1	(Ukraine) Oleh Suslov	Chornomorets Odesa	16
1	(Ukraine) Dmytro Tyapushkin	Nyva Ternopil	16
3	(Ukraine) Valeriy Vorobyov	Kryvbas Kryvyi Rih	14
4	(Ukraine) Volodymyr Marchuk	Volyn Lutsk	12
4	(Ukraine) Mykola Medin	FC Dnipro	12

== Medal squads ==
(league appearances and goals listed in brackets)

1. FC Dynamo Kyiv

Goalkeepers: Andriy Kovtun (14 / -6), Ihor Kutepov (11 / -9), Oleksandr Shovkovskyi (9 / -6).
Defenders: Oleh Luzhnyi (34 / 1), Serhiy Shmatovalenko (27), Vladyslav Vashchuk (24), Vitaliy Ponomarenko (19), Andriy Khomyn (17 / 1), Anatoliy Bezsmertnyi (8), Serhiy Fedorov (1).
Midfielders: Dmytro Topchiyev (32 / 3), Serhiy Mizin (28 / 6), Serhiy Kovalets (28 / 2), Volodymyr Sharan (19 / 4), Andriy Anenkov (13 / 1), Vladyslav Prudius (13 / 1), Maksim Demenko (12), Vyacheslav Khruslov (10 / 1), Yuri Hrytsyna (10), Andriy Zavyalov (9 / 2).
Forwards: Oleksandr Pryzetko (33 / 7), Pavlo Shkapenko (31 / 12), Viktor Leonenko (24 / 15), Mikheil Jishkariani (13 / 1), Vitaliy Mintenko (12 / 2), Serhii Rebrov (10 / 2).

Manager: Mykhailo Fomenko (first half), Yozhef Sabo (second half).

Transferred out during the season: ?.

2. FC Shakhtar Donetsk

Goalkeepers: Dmytro Shutkov (29 / -28), Andriy Kurayev (3 / -3), Volodymyr Havrylov (2 / -1).
Defenders: Viktor Smyhunov (30 / 1), Ihor Leonov (29 / 1), Oleksandr Koval (28), Andriy Kuptsov (24), Oleksandr Melyevanov (7), Ruslan Uzakov (3), Pavlo Filipenko (2).
Midfielders: Serhiy Onopko (33 / 12), Serhiy Yashchenko (33), Hennadiy Orbu (32 / 2), Valeriy Kriventsov (29 / 8), Yuri Byelichenko (29 / 5), Serhiy Popov (28 / 3), Ihor Stolovytsky (22 / 1), Ihor Shcherbyna (6), Serhiy Kovalyov (2).
Forwards: Oleh Matveyev (27 / 17), Serhiy Atelkin (27 / 11), Oleksandr Voskoboinyk (24 / 3).

Manager: Valeriy Yaremchenko.

Transferred out during the season: Ihor Shcherbyna (to Zirka Kirovohrad), Ruslan Uzakov (to (Russia) Shakhter Shakhty).

3. FC Chornomorets Odesa

Goalkeepers: Oleh Suslov (34 / -23), Yevhen Nemodruk (2).
Defenders: Yuriy Bukel (32), Andriy Telesnenko (22 / 1), Viktor Yablonskyi (17), Serhiy Bulyhin-Shramko (16), Yuriy Smotrych (15), Vitaliy Skysh (10).
Midfielders: Ihor Zhabchenko (32 / 5), Dmytro Parfyonov (32 / 3), Viktor Bohatyr (29 / 3), Ruslan Romanchuk (28 / 1), Ihor Korniyets (28), Vyacheslav Yeremeyev (20 / 5), Yuriy Sak (16), Oleksandr Bondarenko (11), Oleh Koshelyuk (11).
Forwards: Tymerlan Huseinov (33 / 18), Kostyantyn Kulyk (28 / 4), Vitaliy Parakhnevych (24 / 8), Vladimir Lebed (10 / 2).

Manager: Viktor Prokopenko.

Transferred out during the season: Yuriy Sak (to (Russia) Spartak Moscow), Oleksandr Bondarenko (to (Hungary) BVSC Budapest), Oleh Koshelyuk (to (Israel) Beitar Jerusalem), Vladimir Lebed (to Krystal Kherson).

Note: Players in italic are whose playing position is uncertain.

== See also ==
- 1993–94 Ukrainian First League
- 1993–94 Ukrainian Second League
- 1993–94 Ukrainian Third League
- 1993–94 Ukrainian Cup
