= Pavlenko =

Pavlenko (Ukrainian, Russian: Павле́нко) is a patronymic surname of Ukrainian origin. The surname is a derivative of the given name Pavlo.

People with this surname:

- Aleksandr Pavlenko (disambiguation), multiple individuals
- Aleksey Pavlenko (skier) (born 1995), Russian skier
- Andrei Pavlenko (disambiguation), multiple individuals
- Aneta Pavlenko, American linguist
- Daria Pavlenko (born 1978), Russian ballet dancer
- Dmitry Pavlenko (born 1991), Russian handball player
- Ivan Omelianowicz-Pavlenko (1881–1962), Ukrainian military officer
- Kateryna Pavlenko (born 1988), Ukrainian singer
- Lyudmyla Pavlenko (born 1981), Ukrainian Paralympian
- Maxym Pavlenko (born 1975), Ukrainian footballer
- Mykhailo Omelianovych-Pavlenko (1878–1952), Ukrainian military leader
- Mykola Pavlenko (born 1979), Ukrainian footballer
- Oleksandr Pavlenko (1941–1995), Ukrainian footballer
- Oleksiy Pavlenko (born 1977), Ukrainian politician
- Pavel Pavlenko (1902–1993), Ukrainian actor
- Pyotr Pavlenko (1899–1951), Soviet writer
- Sergei Pavlenko (born 1953), Russian-British painter
- Vadim Pavlenko (1955–2000), Russian footballer
- Viktor Pavlenko (1886–1932), Ukrainian general
- Vladyslav Pavlenko (born 1994), Ukrainian footballer
- Yuliia Pavlenko (born 1991), Ukrainian Paralympian
- Yuriy Pavlenko (bоrn 1975), Ukrainian politician
