= 1996–97 Ukrainian Cup =

1996—97 Ukrainian Cup
Kubok Ukrainy

Tournament details
- Country: Ukraine
- Dates: 14 August 1996 – 25 May 1997
- Teams: 73

Final positions
- Champions: Shakhtar Donetsk (2nd title)
- Runners-up: Dnipro Dnipropetrovsk

Tournament statistics
- Top goal scorer: Yakiv Kripak (5)

The 1996–97 Ukrainian Cup was the sixth annual edition of Ukraine's football knockout competition, the Ukrainian Cup.

This season, no amateur clubs participated in the competition. Two-legged rounds were revived for the quarterfinals and semifinals. The Cup started with the round of 32, but it also had a couple of preliminaries.

The qualification rounds of the competition started on 14 August 1996 with nine matches.

The cup holder Dynamo Kyiv was eliminated in away game against Nyva Vinnytsia losing on penalty kicks in the Round of 16.

== Team allocation ==
Seventy three teams entered the competition

=== Distribution ===
	Teams entering this round	Teams advancing from previous round
Round of 128 (18 teams)	18 participants of the Second League	
Round of 64 (1st stage) (32 teams)	15 participants of the Second League; 8 participants of the First League	9 winners from the first qualifying round
Round of 64 (2nd stage) (32 teams)	16 participants of the First League	16 winners from the second qualifying round
Round of 32 (32 teams)	16 participants of the Premier League	16 winners from the third qualifying round

== Competition schedule ==
=== Round of 128 ===
FC Pokuttia Kolomyia	1:2	FC Halychyna Drohobych
FC Paperovyk Malyn	1:0	FC Keramik Baranivka
FC Nerafa Slavutych	2:4	FC Fakel Varva
FC Nyva Bershad	1:0	FC Ros Bila Tserkva
FC Portovyk Kerch	0:1	FC Dynamo Saky
FC Portovyk Illichivsk	1:0	FC Torpedo Melitopol
Hirnyk Komsomolsk	0:1	FC Shakhtar-2 Donetsk
FC Petrivtsi Myrhorod	3:1	FC Avanhard Merefa
FC Lokomotyv Smila	2:0	FC Olimpiya Pivdenoukrainsk

=== Round of 64 (1st stage) ===
FC Halychyna Drohobych	1:0	FC Zakarpattia Uzhhorod
FC Paperovyk Malyn	0:1	FC Veres Rivne
FC Fakel Varva	0:1	FC Desna Chernihiv	game was played at Lokomotyv Stadium in Hrebinka
FC Nyva Bershad	1:1	FC Hazovyk Komarne	aet, pk 2:3
FC Obolon Kyiv	3:0	FC Dnipro Cherkasy
FC Karpaty Mukacheve	2:1	FC Kalush
FC Systema-Boreks Borodyanka	2:2	FC CSKA-2 Kyiv	aet, pk 7:8
FC Haray Zhovkva	2:0	FC Khutrovyk Tysmenytsia
FC Oskil Kupiansk	1:0	FC Metalist Kharkiv
FC Shakhtar Stakhanov	1:2	FC Metalurh Donetsk
FC Viktor Zaporizhzhia	1:0	FC Metalurh Novomoskovsk
FC Dynamo Saky	2:1	FC Tytan Armyansk
FC Portovyk Illichivsk	2:1	SC Odesa
FC Shakhtar-2 Donetsk	0:2	FC Metalurh Mariupol	game was played at Hirnyk Stadium in Hirne
FC Petrivtsi Myrhorod	1:0	FC Avanhard-Industria Rovenky
FC Lokomotyv Smila	0:1	FC Krystal Kherson

=== Round of 64 (2nd stage) ===
FC Halychyna Drohobych	0:0	FC Bukovyna Chernivtsi	aet, pk 2:4
FC Veres Rivne	2:3	FC Volyn Lutsk
FC Desna Chernihiv	-:+	FC Yavir Krasnopilya
FC Hazovyk Komarne	3:0	FC Podillya Khmelnytskyi	game was played at Kolos Stadium in Horodok
FC Obolon Kyiv	1:2	FC Dynamo-2 Kyiv
FC Karpaty Mukacheve	3:2	FC Krystal Chortkiv
FC CSKA-2 Kyiv	2:1	FC Khimik Zhytomyr	game was played at the local Sports school Stadium in Bortnichi
FC Haray Zhovkva	0:1	FC Lviv
FC Oskil Kupiansk	0:0	FC Naftovyk Okhtyrka	aet, pk 3:2
FC Metalurh Donetsk	3:2	FC Shakhtar Makiivka	game was played at Shakhtar Stadium
FC Viktor Zaporizhzhia	0:2	FC Polihraftekhnika Oleksandria	game was played at Slavutych Arena
FC Dynamo Saky	1:0	FC Stal Alchevsk
FC Portovyk Illichivsk	3:0	SC Mykolaiv
FC Metalurh Mariupol	5:0	FC Zorya Luhansk
FC Petrivtsi Myrhorod	0:2	FC Khimik Severodonetsk
FC Krystal Kherson	3:3	FC Metalurh Nikopol	aet, pk 5:6

=== Round of 32 (1/16) ===
8 October 1996	FC CSKA-2 Kyiv (1L)	1–2	(PL) FC Torpedo Zaporizhzhia	CSK ZSU Stadium, Kyiv
		Report	Burkhan 6' (own); Bondarenko 32'; Vernydub 52'	Attendance: 600; Referee: Vasyl Babych (Uzhhorod)

9 October 1996	FC Bukovyna Chernivtsi (1L)	1–2 (a.e.t.)	(PL) FC Karpaty Lviv	Bukovyna Stadium, Chernivtsi
	Mintenko 2'	Report	Makovei 90', 101'	Attendance: 4,500; Referee: Viktor Dohadailo (Kyiv)

9 October 1996	FC Volyn Lutsk (PL)	1–0	(PL) SC Tavriya Simferopol	Avanhard Stadium, Lutsk
	Sautin 44'	Report		Attendance: 5,000; Referee: Volodymyr Kutsev (Donetsk)

9 October 1996	FC Yavir Krasnopilya (1L)	0–0 (a.e.t.) (3–4 p)	(PL) FC Kremin Kremenchuk	Kolos Stadium, Krasnopillya
		Report		Attendance: 2,000; Referee: Ihor Horozhankin (Kirovohrad)

9 October 1996	FC Hazovyk Komarno (2L)	0–2	(PL) FC Metalurh Zaporizhzhia	Hazovyk Stadium, Komarne
		Report	Bohatyr 60'; Kolodin 67'	Attendance: 1,000; Referee: Viktor Derdo (Illichivsk)

9 October 1996	FC Dynamo-2 Kyiv (1L)	0–4	(PL) FC Chornomorets Odesa	Dynamo Stadium, Kyiv
		Report	Mhlynets 31'; Kovalets 41', 71'; Kolesnichenko 84'	Attendance: 800; Referee: Yaroslav Hrysyo (Lviv)

9 October 1996	FC Karpaty Mukacheve (2L)	2–1 (a.e.t.)	(PL) FC Kryvbas Kryvyi Rih	Pryladnyk Stadium, Mukacheve
	Hei 47'; Kovtun 99' (pen.)	Report	Yakovenko 45'	Attendance: 4,500; Referee: Viktor Zvyahintsev (Donetsk)

9 October 1996	FC Lviv (1L)	2–3	(PL) FC Dnipro Dnipropetrovsk	Yunist Stadium, Lviv
	Lapko 50'; Lahoida 86'	Report	Poklonskyi 28'; Bahmut 58' (pen.); Filimonov 85'	Attendance: 5,000; Referee: Stepan Selmenskyi (Uzhhorod)

9 October 1996	FC Oskil Kupiansk (2L)	2–3	(PL) FC Nyva Vinnytsia	Oskil Stadium, Kupiansk
	Kryvoruchko 16', 37'	Report	Balatskyi 11'; Romanchuk 16'; Parshyn 55'	Attendance: 5,000; Referee: Ihor Yaremchuk (Kyiv)

9 October 1996	FC Metalurh Donetsk (1L)	1–1 (a.e.t.) (5–6 p)	(PL) FC Dynamo Kyiv	Shakhtar Stadium, Donetsk
	Klymovskyi 17'	Report	Bezhenar 68'	Attendance: 25,000; Referee: Valeriy Avdysh (Simferopol)

9 October 1996	FC Polihraftekhnika Oleksandriya (1L)	1–0	(PL) FC Prykarpattia Ivano-Frankivsk	Olimp Stadium, Oleksandriya
	Maksimov 30'	Report		Attendance: 4,000; Referee: Vadym Shelmenko (Kyiv)

9 October 1996	FC Dynamo Saky (2L)	0–2	(PL) FC CSKA Kyiv	Avanhard Stadium, Saky
		Report	Zakarlyuka 15'; Seleznyov 44'	Attendance: 6,500; Referee: Leonid Bavykin (Kharkiv)

9 October 1996	FC Portovyk Illichivsk (2L)	1–1 (a.e.t.) (3–4 p)	(PL) FC Zirka-NIBAS Kirovohrad	Portovyk Stadium, Illichivsk
	Fedoseyev 61' (pen.)	Report	Myzenko 52'	Attendance: 5,000; Referee: Anatoliy Aranovskyi (Kyiv)

9 October 1996	FC Metalurh Mariupol (1L)	1–3	(PL) FC Shakhtar Donetsk	Azovstal Stadium, Mariupol
	Pinchuk 88'	Report	Matveyev 21' (pen.), 86'; Onopko 75'	Attendance: 6,000; Referee: Kostiantyn Panchyk (Simferopol)

9 October 1996	FC Khimik Severodonetsk (1L)	4–0	(PL) FC Nyva Ternopil	Khimik Stadium, Severodonetsk
	Mor 63'; Babenko 73'; Horodov 76'; Palamarchuk 81'	Report		Attendance: 7,000; Referee: Vadym Shevchenko (Kyiv)

9 October 1996	FC Metalurh Nikopol (1L)	0–3	(PL) FC Vorskla Poltava	Elektrometalurh Stadium, Nikopol
		Report	Marchenko 7'; Chuichenko 41'; Samoilov 45'	Attendance: 3,000; Referee: Serhiy Dzyuba (Kyiv)

=== Round of 16 (1/8) ===
17 October 1996	Dnipro Dnipropetrovsk (PL)	2–0	(PL) Torpedo Zaporizhzhia	Meteor Stadium, Dnipropetrovsk
	Byelkin 74'; Sharan 75'	Report		Attendance: 1,000; Referee: Viktor Derdo (Illichivsk)

17 October 1996	Nyva Vinnytsia (PL)	0–0 (a.e.t.) (4–3 p)	(PL) Dynamo Kyiv	Central City Stadium, Vinnytsia
		Report		Attendance: 13,000; Referee: Kostyantyn Panchyk (Simferopol)
	Penalties
	Solovienko (penalty scored); Brovchenko (penalty scored); Romanchuk (penalty scored); Demydyak (penalty scored)		Rebrov (penalty scored); Mykhailenko (penalty scored); Kosovskyi (penalty missed); Bezhenar (penalty scored); Shkapenko (penalty missed)

17 October 1996	CSKA Kyiv (PL)	1–0	(1L) Polihraftekhnika Oleksandriya	CSK ZSU Stadium, Kyiv
	Vus 89'	Report		Attendance: 2,000; Referee: Volodymyr Kutsev (Donetsk)

17 October 1996	Zirka Kirovohrad (PL)	0–1	(PL) Shakhtar Donetsk	Zirka Stadium, Kirovohrad
		Report	Shyshchenko 69'	Attendance: 7,000; Referee: Viktor Dohadailo (Kyiv)

17 October 1996	Karpaty Lviv (PL)	1–0	(1L) Volyn Lutsk	Ukraina Stadium, Lviv
	Kolesnyk 55'; Kuptsov (yellow card) 82' (yellow-red card) 86'	Report	Dranytsky (yellow card) 82' (yellow-red card) 88'	Attendance: 6,500; Referee: Stepan Selmensky (Uzhhorod)

17 October 1996	Kremin Kremenchuk (PL)	3–5	(PL) Metalurh Zaporizhzhia	Dnipro Stadium, Kremenchuk
	Fedkov 55', 59'; Chernov 69'	Report	Kripak 18', 64', 69'; Ivanov 60'; Kolodin 88'	Attendance: 4,000; Referee: Yaroslav Hrysyo (Lviv)

17 October 1996	Chornomorets Odesa (PL)	7–0	(1L) Karpaty Mukacheve	BSS Stadium, Odesa
	Sak 8' (pen.); Chumachenko 39'; Mhlynets 47'; Nykolaichuk 55'; Musolitin (penalty missed) 63'; Babych 70'; Seleznyov 78'; Musolitin 85'	Report		Attendance: 1,500; Referee: Ihor Ishchenko (Kyiv)

17 October 1996	Vorskla Poltava (PL)	2–0	(1L) Khimik Severodonetsk	Vorskla Stadium, Poltava
	Shariy 14', 55'	Report		Attendance: 9,000; Referee: Anatoliy Zhosan (Kherson)

=== Quarterfinals (1/4) ===
In this round enter the four winners from the previous round. All the teams are from the Premier League.

Team 1	Agg.	Team 2	1st leg	2nd leg
FC Karpaty Lviv	1–4	FC Metalurh Zaporizhzhia	1–1	0–3
FC Chornomorets Odesa	0–4	FC Dnipro Dnipropetrovsk	0–1	0–3
FC CSKA Kyiv	3–1	FC Nyva Vinnytsia	2–0	1–1
FC Vorskla Poltava	1–2	FC Shakhtar Donetsk	0–0	1–2

==== First leg ====
30 October 1996	Karpaty Lviv (PL)	1–1	(PL) Metalurh Zaporizhzhia	Ukraina Stadium, Lviv
	Pokladok 44'	Report	Poltavets 40'	Attendance: 4,500; Referee: Serhiy Tatulyan (Kyiv)

30 October 1996	Chornomorets Odesa (PL)	0–1	(PL) Dnipro Dnipropetrovsk	BSS Central Stadium, Odesa
15:00 LST	Bukel (red card) 90'	Report	Byelkin 89'	Attendance: 2,000; Referee: Ihor Horozhankin (Kirovohrad)

30 October 1996	CSKA Kyiv (PL)	2–0	(PL) Nyva Vinnytsia	CSK ZSU Stadium, Kyiv
	Levchenko 12'; Seleznyov 58' (pen.)	Report	Balatsky (red card) 58'	Attendance: 1,000; Referee: Valeriy Onufer (Uzhhorod)

30 October 1996	Vorskla Poltava (PL)	0–0	(PL) Shakhtar Donetsk	Vorskla Stadium, Poltava
		Report		Attendance: 8,000; Referee: Valeriy Avdysh (Simferopol)

==== Second leg ====
13 November 1996	Metalurh Zaporizhzhia (PL)	3–0	(PL) Karpaty Lviv	Metalurh Stadium, Zaporizhzhia
	Karyaka 32'; Oliynyk 39'; Markin (penalty missed) 80'; Kripak 86'	Report		Attendance: 8,500; Referee: Ihor Khiblin (Khmelnytskyi)

Metalurh won 4–1 on aggregate.

13 November 1996	Dnipro Dnipropetrovsk (PL)	3–0	(PL) Chornomorets Odesa	Meteor Stadium, Dnipropetrovsk
	Sharan 17'; Korponai 20'; Byelkin 71' (pen.)	Report		Attendance: 3,500; Referee: Vasyl Melnychuk (Simferopol)

Dnipro won 4–0 on aggregate.

13 November 1996	Nyva Vinnytsia (PL)	1–1	(PL) CSKA Kyiv	Central City Stadium, Vinnytsia
	Ryabtsev 66' (pen.); Lyubynsky (penalty missed) 81'	Report	Kovalchuk 52'	Attendance: 3,000; Referee: Volodymyr Pianykh (Donetsk)

CSKA won 3–1 on aggregate.

13 November 1996	Shakhtar Donetsk (PL)	2–1	(PL) Vorskla Poltava	Shakhtar Stadium, Donetsk
	Potskhveria 47'; Leonov 71' (pen.)	Report	Samoilov 44'	Attendance: 7,500; Referee: Ihor Yarmenchuk (Kyiv)

Shakhtar won 2–1 on aggregate.

=== Semifinals (1/2) ===
In this round enter the four winners from the previous round. All the teams are from the Premier League.

Team 1	Agg.	Team 2	1st leg	2nd leg
FC Shakhtar Donetsk	5–1	FC CSKA Kyiv	2–1	3–0
FC Dnipro Dnipropetrovsk	3–2	FC Metalurh Zaporizhzhia	3–0	0–2

==== First leg ====
6 March 1997	Shakhtar Donetsk (PL)	2–1	(PL) CSKA Kyiv	Shakhtar Stadium, Donetsk
	Kryventsov 54'; Potskhveria 66'	Report	Polishchuk 71'	Attendance: 4,000; Referee: Valeriy Onufer (Uzhhorod)

6 March 1997	Dnipro Dnipropetrovsk (PL)	3–0	(PL) Metalurh Zaporizhzhia	Meteor Stadium, Dnipropetrovsk
	Sharan 16'; Moroz 33', 52'; Sharan (penalty missed) 85'	Report	Haidarzhy (yellow card) 21' (yellow-red card) 76'	Attendance: 7,000; Referee: Vasyl Melnychuk (Simferopol)

==== Second leg ====
10 March 1997	CSKA Kyiv (PL)	0–3	(PL) Shakhtar Donetsk	CSK ZSU Stadium, Kyiv
	Reva (red card) 16'	Report	Babiy 18'; Potskhveria 44'; Seleznyov (penalty missed) 83'; Onopko 87'	Attendance: 12,000; Referee: Ihor Horozhankin (Kirovohrad)

Shakhtar won 5–1 on aggregate.

20 May 1997	Metalurh Zaporizhzhia (PL)	2–0	(PL) Dnipro Dnipropetrovsk	Metalurh Stadium, Zaporizhzhia
19:30	Kripak 68'; Karyaka 76'	Report		Attendance: 9,000; Referee: Ihor Yarmenchuk (Kyiv)

Dnipro won 3–2 on aggregate.

=== Final ===
The final was held at the NSC Olimpiysky on May 25, 1997, in Kyiv.

1997-05-25
?:? LST

Shakhtar Donetsk	1–0	Dnipro Dnipropetrovsk
Atelkin 36'	Report

NSC Olimpiyskiy, Kyiv
Attendance: 26,000
Referee: Serhiy Tatulian (Kyiv), (FIFA)

== Top goalscorers ==
Rank	Scorer	Goals (Pen.)	Team
1	(Ukraine) Yakiv Kripak	5	Metalurh Zaporizhzhia
2	(Ukraine) Vadym Vus	3	CSKA-2 Kyiv; CSKA Kyiv
2	(Ukraine) Yuriy Hetman	3	Metalurh Mariupol
2	(Ukraine) Petro Holubka	3	Volyn Lutsk
2	(Ukraine) Oleksandr Kryvoruchko	3	Oskil Kupiansk
2	(Ukraine) Oleksandr Krasnyansky	3	Portovyk Illichivsk
2	(Georgia (country)) Mikheil Potskhveria	3	Shakhtar Donetsk
2	(Ukraine) Volodymyr Sharan	3	Dnipro Dnipropetrovsk
2	(Ukraine) Viktor Byelkin	3 (1)	Dnipro Dnipropetrovsk

== See also ==
- 1996–97 Vyshcha Liha
