= 1983 Soviet Second League, Zone 6 =

Football championship of Ukrainian SSR

Football Championship of Ukrainian SSR
- Season: 1983
- Champions: SKA Kiev
- Promoted: none (after playoffs)
- Relegated: Frunzenets Sumy
- Top goalscorer: 41 - Viktor Nastashevsky (SKA K.)

1983 Football Championship of Ukrainian SSR was the 53rd season of association football competition of the Ukrainian SSR, which was part of the Soviet Second League in Zone 6. The season started on 25 March 1983.

The 1983 Football Championship of Ukrainian SSR was won by SKA Kiev. Qualified for the interzonal playoffs, the team from Kiev did not manage to gain promotion by placing last in its group.

The "Ruby Cup" of Molod Ukrayiny newspaper (for the most scored goals) was received by Kolos Mezhyrich.

== Teams ==
=== Location map ===
Locations of teams in Lower Second League, Zone 1

=== Promoted teams ===
- Nyva Berezhany – Champion of the Fitness clubs competitions (KFK) (debut)

=== Relegated teams ===
- SKA Kiev – (Returning after 2 seasons)
- SKA Odessa – (Returning after 6 seasons)

== Final standings ==
Pos	Team	Pld	W	D	L	GF	GA	GD	Pts	Qualification or relegation
1	SKA Kiev (C, Q)	50	28	16	6	91	49	+42	72	Qualified for interzonal competitions among other Zone winners
2	Kolos Mezhyrich	50	30	10	10	99	45	+54	70	
3	Nyva Vinnytsia	50	29	11	10	86	44	+42	69	
4	SKA Odessa	50	27	11	12	66	29	+37	65	
5	Kryvbas Kryvyi Rih	50	23	18	9	70	44	+26	64	
6	Bukovyna Chernivtsi	50	23	14	13	79	52	+27	60	
7	Spartak Zhytomyr	50	21	14	15	66	50	+16	56	
8	Avanhard Rivne	50	19	16	15	56	59	−3	54	
9	Shakhtar Horlivka	50	20	13	17	56	55	+1	53	
10	Zakarpattia Uzhhorod	50	20	11	19	67	64	+3	51	
11	Torpedo Lutsk	50	20	9	21	66	71	−5	49	
12	Metalurh Dniprodzerzhynsk	50	17	14	19	35	39	−4	48	
13	Nyva Berezhany	50	15	18	17	41	51	−10	48	
14	Atlantyka Sevastopol	50	17	13	20	53	50	+3	47	
15	Podillia Khmelnytskyi	50	18	10	22	56	67	−11	46	
16	Krystal Kherson	50	17	10	23	45	55	−10	44	
17	Zirka Kirovohrad	50	15	14	21	48	56	−8	44	
18	Novator Zhdanov	50	14	15	21	43	56	−13	43	
19	Okean Kerch	50	13	16	21	44	58	−14	42	
20	Mayak Kharkiv	50	15	11	24	54	72	−18	41	
21	Stakhonovets Stakhanov	50	12	17	21	39	64	−25	41	
22	Prykarpattia Ivano-Frankivsk	50	17	6	27	54	76	−22	40	
23	Desna Chernihiv	50	16	8	26	50	66	−16	40	
24	Sudnobudivnyk Mykolaiv	50	15	10	25	49	77	−28	40	
25	Dnipro Cherkasy	50	13	13	24	35	61	−26	39	
26	Frunzenets Sumy (R)	50	11	12	27	47	85	−38	34	Relegated

(C) Champions; (Q) Qualified for the phase indicated; (R) Relegated

== Top goalscorers ==
The following were the top ten goalscorers.

#	Scorer	Goals (Pen.)	Team
1	Viktor Nastashevsky	41	SKA Kiev
2	Oleksandr Novikov	32	Kolos Mezhyrich
3	Pasha Kasanov	27	Nyva Vinnytsia
4	Volodymyr Malyi	24	SKA Odessa
4	Volodymyr Shyshkov	24	Spartak Zhytomyr
6	Viktor Oliynyk	23	Bukovyna Chernivtsi
7	Vitaliy Dmytrenko	22	Kryvbas Kryvyi Rih
8	Mykola Prystay	21	Prykarpattia Ivano-Frankivsk
8	Pavlo Petrov	21	Atlantyka Sevastopol
10	Hennadiy Horshkov	19	Desna Chernihiv
10	Serhiy Shevchenko	19	Nyva Vinnytsia

== See also ==
- Soviet Second League
