= Viktor Aristov =

Viktor Aristov may refer to:

- Viktor Aristov (football manager) (1938–2023), Soviet football manager
- Viktor Aristov (director) (1948–1994), Soviet film director
