= Uzakov =

Uzakov is a surname. Notable people with the surname include:

- Alisher Uzakov (born 1984), Uzbek actor, film director, singer, and professional footballer
- Ruslan Uzakov (born 1967), Uzbekistani footballer
- Vaja Uzakov (born 1988), Uzbek tennis player
