= 1985 Soviet Second League, Zone 6 =

Football Championship of Ukrainian SSR
- Season: 1985
- Champions: Tavriya Simferopol
- Promoted: none (after playoffs)
- Relegated: Metalurh Dniprodzerzhynsk
- Top goalscorer: 29 - Volodymyr Naumenko (Tavriya)

1985 Football Championship of Ukrainian SSR was the 55th season of association football competition of the Ukrainian SSR, which was part of the Soviet Second League in Zone 6. The season started on 30 March 1985.

The 1985 Football Championship of Ukrainian SSR was won by SC Tavriya Simferopol. Qualified for the interzonal playoffs, the team from Crimean Oblast did not manage to gain promotion by placing second in its group.

The "Ruby Cup" of Molod Ukrayiny newspaper (for the most scored goals) was received by SC Tavriya Simferopol.

== Format ==
The season consisted of two stages preliminary and final tournaments. During the preliminary tournament participants were split into two groups of 14 teams in each with the seven best of each group qualifying for the championship group of the next stage and the seven worst played a consolation tournament.

In the final stage of both championship and consolation tournaments teams played home and away only with teams of another group. The winner of championship tournament further participated in the Soviet Second League interzonal playoffs in an effort to gain promotion to the First League, while the worst team of consolation tournament relegated to amateurs.

== Teams ==
=== Promoted teams ===
- Torpedo Zaporizhia – Champion of the Fitness clubs competitions (KFK) (debut)

=== Relegated teams ===
- Zorya Luhansk – 20th place (returning after an absence of 27 seasons) (Note: Last season Zorya played in the third division was in 1959 when it participated as Avanhard Luhansk in the championship of the Ukrainian SSR (at that time amateur level (KFK)). In 1964 Zorya was merged with Trudovi Rezervy that played a division higher.)
- Tavriya Simferopol – 21st place (returning after an absence of 11 seasons)

=== Renamed teams ===
- FC Nyva Ternopil used to be located in Berezhany.

== Preliminary stage ==
=== Group 1 ===
==== Location map ====
Locations of teams in Lower Second League, Zone 1

==== Final standings ====
Pos	Team	Pld	W	D	L	GF	GA	GD	Pts	Qualification
1	Nyva Vinnytsia	26	14	10	2	68	23	+45	38	Qualified for the championship tournament
2	Sudnobudivnyk Mykolaiv	26	13	8	5	40	26	+14	34	Qualified for the championship tournament
3	SKA Kyiv	26	12	9	5	34	22	+12	33	Qualified for the championship tournament
4	Nyva Ternopil	26	13	6	7	27	20	+7	32	Qualified for the championship tournament
5	SKA Odesa	26	9	11	6	29	23	+6	29	Qualified for the championship tournament
6	Bukovyna Chernivtsi	26	11	6	9	28	25	+3	28	Qualified for the championship tournament
7	Zakarpattia Uzhhorod	26	9	8	9	25	22	+3	26	Qualified for the championship tournament
8	Torpedo Lutsk	26	9	7	10	21	24	−3	25	
9	Prykarpattia Ivano-Frankivsk	26	8	8	10	24	34	−10	24	
10	Desna Chernihiv	26	8	7	11	25	31	−6	23	
11	Dynamo Irpin	26	6	11	9	23	25	−2	23	
12	Podillia Khmelnytskyi	26	5	11	10	25	45	−20	21	
13	Avanhard Rivne	26	5	5	16	19	45	−26	15	
14	Spartak Zhytomyr	26	4	5	17	17	40	−23	13	

=== Group 2 ===
==== Location map ====
Locations of teams in Lower Second League, Zone 1

==== Final standings ====
Pos	Team	Pld	W	D	L	GF	GA	GD	Pts	Qualification
1	Tavriya Simferopol	26	14	6	6	39	21	+18	34	Qualified for the championship tournament
2	Zirka Kirovohrad	26	12	6	8	43	31	+12	30	Qualified for the championship tournament
3	Atlantyka Sevastopol	26	12	6	8	32	24	+8	30	Qualified for the championship tournament
4	Shakhtar Horlivka	26	11	8	7	41	31	+10	30	Qualified for the championship tournament
5	Kolos Mezhyrich	26	13	3	10	35	30	+5	29	Qualified for the championship tournament
6	Zorya Voroshilovgrad	26	12	5	9	35	26	+9	29	Qualified for the championship tournament
7	Okean Kerch	26	11	7	8	27	23	+4	29	Qualified for the championship tournament
8	Kryvbas Kryvyi Rih	26	8	13	5	23	20	+3	29	
9	Mayak Kharkiv	26	8	8	10	27	29	−2	24	
10	Krystal Kherson	26	9	4	13	28	51	−23	22	
11	Novator Zhdanov	26	8	6	12	22	30	−8	22	
12	Torpedo Zaporizhia	26	8	5	13	26	33	−7	21	
13	Metalurh Dniprodzerzhynsk	26	7	7	12	29	32	−3	21	
14	Stakhonovets Stakhanov	26	3	8	15	14	40	−26	14	

== Final stage ==
=== Championship tournament ===
==== Final standings ====
Pos	Team	Pld	W	D	L	GF	GA	GD	Pts	Qualification
1	Tavriya Simferopol(C) (Q)	40	25	10	5	69	35	+34	60	Qualified for interzonal competitions among other Zone winners
2	Nyva Vinnytsia	40	22	15	3	102	46	+56	59	
3	Sudnobudivnyk Mykolaiv	40	20	9	11	65	42	+23	49	
4	SKA Kiev	40	17	14	9	53	38	+15	48	
5	SKA Odessa	40	19	9	12	50	39	+11	47	
6	Zakarpattia Uzhhorod	40	16	13	11	58	48	+10	45	
7	Nyva Ternopil	40	17	9	14	44	44	0	43	
8	Kolos Mezhyrich	40	16	11	13	64	50	+14	43	
9	Bukovyna Chernivtsi	40	17	7	16	49	47	+2	41	
10	Zirka Kirovohrad	40	16	9	15	50	49	+1	41	
11	Atlantyka Sevastopol	40	16	9	15	46	44	+2	41	
12	Shakhtar Horlivka	40	14	13	13	49	39	+10	41	
13	Zorya Voroshilovgrad	40	14	10	16	46	40	+6	38	
14	Okean Kerch	40	12	8	20	42	62	−20	32	

=== Consolation tournament ===
==== Final standings ====
Pos	Team	Pld	W	D	L	GF	GA	GD	Pts	Relegation
15	Torpedo Lutsk	40	14	13	13	40	38	+2	41	
16	Kryvbas Kryvyi Rih	40	13	15	12	36	39	−3	41	
17	Krystal Kherson	40	12	16	12	41	46	−5	40	
18	Novator Zhdanov	40	15	9	16	47	47	0	39	
19	Prykarpattia Ivano-Frankivsk	40	14	10	16	42	42	0	38	
20	Dynamo Irpin	40	14	10	16	46	48	−2	38	
21	Desna Chernihiv	40	16	5	19	48	79	−31	37	
22	Podillya Khmelnytskyi	40	14	9	17	35	42	−7	37	
23	Avanhard Rivne	40	13	10	17	37	44	−7	36	
24	Torpedo Zaporizhia	40	11	12	17	42	46	−4	34	
25	Mayak Kharkiv	40	9	14	17	51	72	−21	32	
26	Spartak Zhytomyr	40	9	13	18	31	50	−19	31	
27	Stakhanovets Stakhanov	40	10	7	23	37	60	−23	27	
28	Metalurh Dniprodzerzhynsk (R)	40	7	8	25	29	65	−36	22	Relegated

(R) Relegated

== Top goalscorers ==
The following were the top ten goalscorers.

#	Scorer	Goals (Pen.)	Team
1	Volodymyr Naumenko	29	Tavriya Simferopol
2	Yuriy Smahin	25	Sudnobudivnyk Mykolaiv
3	Ihor Yavorskyi	20	Nyva Ternopil
3	Viktor Mhlynets	20	Bukovyna Chernivtsi
5	Volodymyr Yurchenko	19	SKA Kiev
6	Semen Osynovsky	18	Tavriya Simferopol
7	Pasha Kasanov	17	Nyva Vinnytsia
7	Stepan Pavlov	17	Atlantyka Sevastopol
7	Hennadiy Horshkov	17	Desna Chernihiv

== See also ==
- Soviet Second League
