= Onopko =

Onopko or Onopka (Cyrillic: Онопко) is a gender-neutral Ukrainian surname that may refer to the following notable people:

- Serhiy Onopko (born 1973), Ukrainian football midfielder, brother of Viktor
- Snejana Onopka (born 1986), Ukrainian model
- Viktor Onopko (born 1969), Russian football coach and former player of Ukrainian origin
