= Tymerlan Huseynov =

Ukrainian footballer

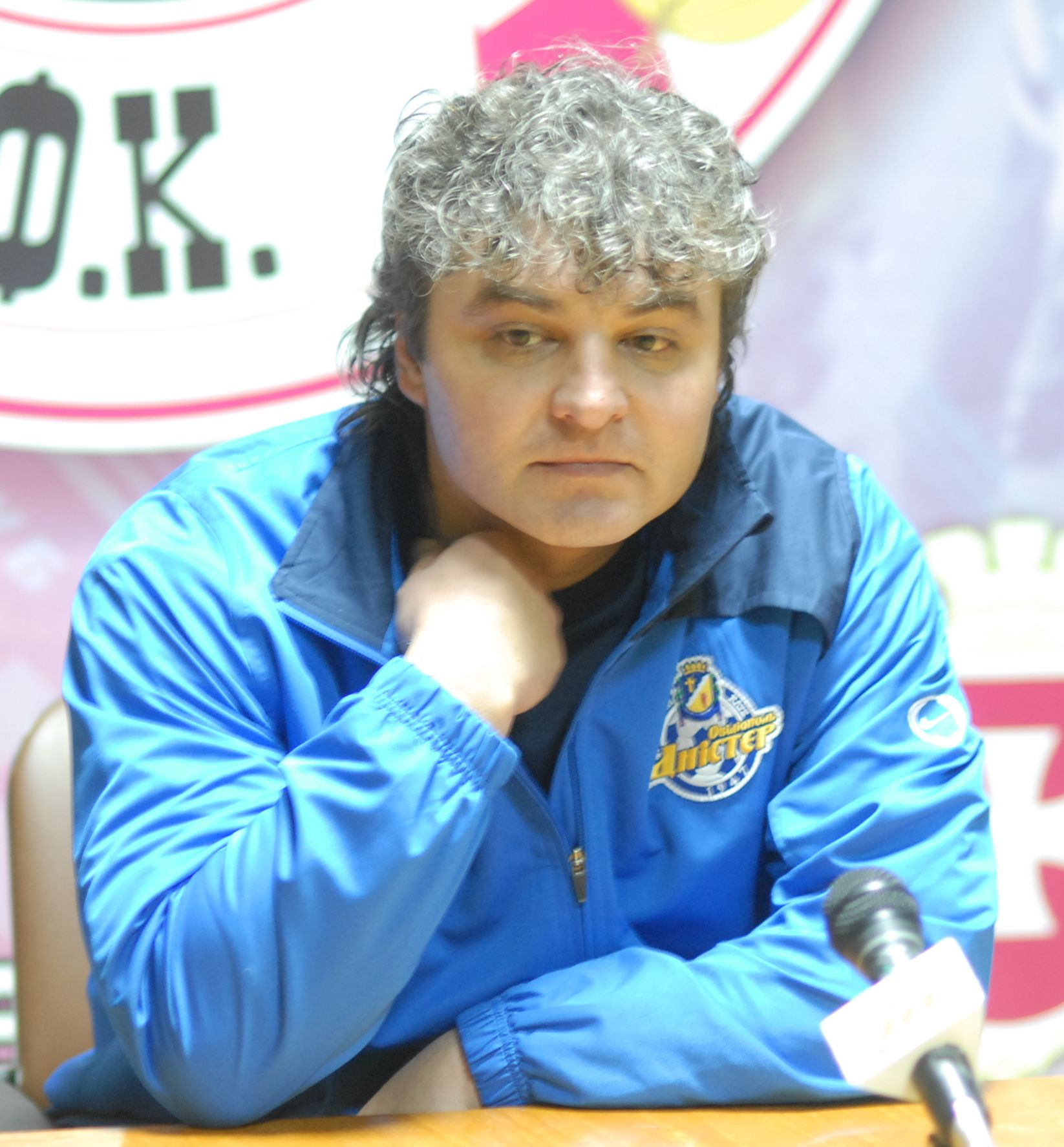
- Huseynov at FC Dniester Ovidiopol in 2008

Personal information
- Full name: Tymerlan Rustamovych Huseynov
- Date of birth: 24 January 1968 (age 58)
- Place of birth: Buynaksk, Dagestan, Soviet Union
- Height: 1.85 m (6 ft 1 in)
- Position: Striker

Youth career
- 1976–1982: Sports school Pervomaisk
- 1983–1984: Sports school Voroshylovhrad

Senior career*
Years	Team	Apps	(Gls)
1985–1986	Zorya Voroshylovhrad	59	(17)
1987	SKA Kyiv	6	(2)
1987–1988	CSKA Moscow	13	(1)
1988	→ CSKA-2 Moscow	8	(3)
1989–1990	Zorya Luhansk	84	(30)
1991	Metalurh Zaporizhia	14	(0)
1992–1993	Zorya Luhansk	42	(19)
1993–2000	Chornomorets Odesa	204	(79)
1999–2000	→ Chornomorets-2 Odesa	3	(0)
2001–2002	Spartak Sumy	31	(11)
Total		464	(162)

International career
1993–1997	Ukraine	14	(8)

Managerial career
- 2007–2008: Dniester Ovidiopol (assistant)
- 2008–2013: Dniester Ovidiopol / FC Odesa (sports director)
- 2013–: Real Pharma Odesa (assistant)
- * Club domestic league appearances and goals

Tymerlan Rustamovych Huseynov (Ukrainian: Тимерлан Рустамович Гусейнов, Russian: Тимерлан Рустамович Гусейнов; born 24 January 1968) is a Ukrainian former footballer who is now sporting director of FC Dniester Ovidiopol. He was the Ukrainian Premier League's top goalscorer in the 1993–94 and 1995–96 seasons (both with Chornomorets Odesa) scoring 18 and 20 goals respectively, and scored 8 goals in 14 internationals.

== Playing career ==
Huseynov was born in Buynaksk, Dagestan ASSR, Soviet Union, now within Dagestan, Russia, to a Kumyk father and Ukrainian mother. In 1970 Huseynov with his family moved to Pervomaysk, Ukrainian SSR.

Huseynov holds many firsts in Ukrainian soccer history, including being the first player to score 100 goals in official matches in Ukraine. He is also one of the all-time leading scorers in the Ukrainian Premier League with 85 goals in 215 matches. Though long retired from the national side and with only 14 caps to show for four years of service (between 1993 and 1997), Huseynov is the #10 all-time scorer (as of 31 January 2012) in the Ukraine national team's history with 8 goals.

== Coaching career ==
After retiring from playing Huseynov began coaching at the last club he played, Signal, an amateur club from Odesa. He coached them from 2004 to 2007, winning the Odesa Oblast Cup in the process. In February 2007 he was hired as an assistant coach with FC Dniester Ovidiopol. In 2008, he moved into the administrative side of the club, becoming Dniester's sporting director.

== Career statistics ==
=== Club ===
Club	Season	League		Cup		Europe		Total	
Club	Season	Apps	Goals	Apps	Goals	Apps	Goals	Apps	Goals
Zorya	1985	28	9	-	-	-	-	28	9
Zorya	1986	31	8	1	0	-	-	32	8
SKA Kyiv	1987	6	2	-	-	-	-	6	2
CSKA Moscow	1987	12	1	-	-	-	-	12	1
CSKA Moscow	1988	1	0	-	-	-	-	1	0
Zorya	1989	48	18	-	-	-	-	48	18
Zorya	1990	36	12	1	0	-	-	37	12
Metalurh Z	1991	14	0	-	-	-	-	14	0
Zorya	1992	15	11	2	1	-	-	17	12
Zorya	1992–93	27	8	4	1	-	-	31	9
Chornomorets	1993–94	33	18	8	2	-	-	41	20
Chornomorets	1994–95	29	12	7	2	2	1	38	15
Chornomorets	1995–96	33	20	1	0	5	1	39	21
Chornomorets	1996–97	28	9	3	0	4	0	35	9
Chornomorets	1997–98	27	6	5	2	-	-	32	8
Chornomorets	1998–99	29	13	-	-	-	-	29	13
Chornomorets	1999-00	23	1	1	0	-	-	24	1
Chornomorets	2000–01	2	0	-	-	-	-	2	0
Spartak Sumy	2000–01	15	3	-	-	-	-	15	3
Spartak Sumy	2001–02	16	8	2	0	-	-	18	8
Career	Total	453	159	35	8	11	2	499	169

=== International goals ===
№	Date	Venue	Opponent	Score	Result	Competition
1	13 November 1994	Republican Stadium, Kyiv, Ukraine	Estonia	3–0	3–0	UEFA Euro 1996 qualifying
2	26 April 1995	Kadriorg Stadium, Tallinn, Estonia	Estonia	1–0	1–0	UEFA Euro 1996 qualifying
3	6 September 1995	Žalgiris Stadium, Vilnius, Lithuania	Lithuania	1–1	3–1	UEFA Euro 1996 qualifying
4	6 September 1995	Žalgiris Stadium, Vilnius, Lithuania	Lithuania	2–1	3–1	UEFA Euro 1996 qualifying
5	11 October 1995	Bežigrad Stadium, Ljubljana, Slovenia	Slovenia	2–0	2–3	UEFA Euro 1996 qualifying
6	9 April 1996	Stadionul Republican, Chișinău, Moldova	Moldova	1–0	2–2	Friendly match
7	9 April 1996	Stadionul Republican, Chișinău, Moldova	Moldova	2–0	2–2	Friendly match
8	1 May 1996	Samsun 19 Mayıs Stadium, Samsun, Turkey	Turkey	2–3	2–3	Friendly match

== Honours ==
=== Club ===
Zorya Luhansk

- Soviet Second League: 1986

Chornomorets Odesa

- Ukrainian Cup: 1994
- Ukrainian Premier League runner-up: 1994–95, 1995–96; third place: 1993–94

=== Individual ===
- Ukrainian Premier League Top Scorer: 1993–94, 1995–96
