= Cognitive shift =

Brain change due to some external force

A cognitive shift or shift in cognitive focus is triggered by the brain's response and change due to some external force.

== General cause ==
A cognitive shift can occur when a person undergoes a new experience, such as some astronauts experiencing the overview effect when launched into space.

Cognitive shifts can occur with or without the aid of an externally ingested psychoactive substance such as LSD or peyote. Psychedelic experiences often involve sudden shifts in cognitive association and emotive content.

Religious mystic experiences are often described as cognitive shifts, for instance in the writings of William James. For example, William James described how one can shift from being anxious to calm by the "phenomena of seership" or the "exercise of power".

== Traditional psychology ==
Cognitive shift (in the development of psychology) can also refer to the understanding that thoughts (i.e. cognitions) play a key role in a person's emotional state and behaviour. It was theorised by earlier behavioral psychologists that individuals were empty vessels and new experiences would be created by being repeatedly exposed and/or rewarded in relation to certain things (such as in rote learning of times tables).

The cognitive shift however, demonstrated that thoughts also play an integral process. A key experiment placed a rat in a maze and after rotating the maze the rat was able to use pointers around the room in order to find a food reward. This suggested that the rat had used internal cognition in order to influence its behavior to gain a reward. This experiment was performed by Edward C. Tolman and he explained this phenomenon as a cognitive map.

Children, when learning a language, often and quite suddenly begin to apply rules they have learned to new phrases such as saying "I've drinken all my drink" after learning "I've eaten all my food". This is usually without being taught these rules first and as such demonstrate a key role of cognition in terms of learning. This principal is further illustrated by study conducted by Park, H. I., & Ziegler, N. (2014). Their study illustrates that overall, cross-linguistics show a connection between language and our ability to conceptualize concepts. Linguistics influence an individual's mind from a very early age. A lot of attention has been given to the topic of bilingual cognition research due to the fact that speaking multiple languages changes the way environments are evaluated. Ukrainian-American linguist Aneta Pavlenko defines coexistence as the tendency of those who speak multiple languages to create and maintain cognitive patterns that are specific to each language. Sachs and Coley provided evidence for this phenomenon in 2006 through their investigation of Russian–English bilinguals’ emotional understanding. Their results showed that multilingual people explain the difference between jealousy and envy differently depending on which language the question is asked in, lending credence to the idea of coexistence.

Cognitive shifts may occur after a therapist identifies an underlying fear or response mechanism and assists the client with developing remedial actions via cognitive behavioral therapy.

== See also ==
- Alan Watts
- Timothy Leary
  - Eight-circuit model of consciousness
