= 1996–97 Vyshcha Liha =

6th season of top-tier football league in Vyshcha Liha

Vyshcha Liha
- Season: 1996–97
- Champions: Dynamo Kyiv; 5th title
- Relegated: Nyva Vinnytsia, Kremin Kremenchuk
- Champions League: Dynamo Kyiv
- Cup Winners' Cup: Shakhtar Donetsk
- UEFA Cup: Vorskla Poltava, Dnipro Dnipropetrovsk
- Top goalscorer: (21) Oleh Matveyev (Shakhtar)

The 1996–97 Vyshcha Liha season was the 6th since its establishment and the inaugural season as part of the Professional Football League (PFL). FC Dynamo Kyiv were the defending champions.

== Teams ==
Due to reorganization by becoming a member of the newly established Professional Football League of Ukraine, the Vyshcha Liha was reduced from 18 to 16 teams.

=== Promotions ===
- Vorskla Poltava, the champion of the 1995–96 Ukrainian First League – (debut)

=== Relegated teams ===
- Zorya Luhansk – relegated after five seasons in the top flight.
- Volyn Lutsk – relegated after five seasons in the top flight.
- SC Mykolaiv – relegated after two seasons in the top flight.

=== Reorganized clubs ===
Before the start of the season, CSKA-Borysfen Kyiv was replaced with CSKA Kyiv (1995–96 Ukrainian Second League Group A winner). Just before the start of the new 1996–97 season, a scandal took place related to ownership. Dmytro Zlobenko was removed from the club, which, with the help of the Army, was passed to some businessman by the name of Mikhail Grinshpon, the president of "Kyiv–Donbas". Concurrently, Mikhail Grinshpon was an adviser to the Ukrainian Minister of Defense Oleksandr Kuzmuk.

=== Location ===
Locations of teams home grounds in Ukrainian Premier League 1996-97

== Managers ==
Club	Coach	Replaced Coach	Home stadium
FC Dynamo Kyiv	(Ukraine) Valery Lobanovsky	(Ukraine) Yozhef Sabo 17 games(first half)	Dynamo Stadium
FC Shakhtar Donetsk	(Ukraine) Valery Yaremchenko		Shakhtar Stadium
FC Vorskla Poltava	(Ukraine) Viktor Pozhechevskyi		Vorskla Stadium
FC Dnipro Dnipropetrovsk	(Ukraine) Vyacheslav Hrozny		Meteor Stadium
FC Karpaty Lviv	(Ukraine) Myron Markevych		Ukraina Stadium
SC Tavriya Simferopol	(Ukraine) Mykola Pavlov	(Ukraine) Serhiy Shevchenko 10 games (Ukraine) Ivan Balan 5 games (Ukraine) Valeriy Shvediuk 7 games	Lokomotyv Stadium
FC Chornomorets Odesa	(Ukraine) Leonid Buriak		Black Sea Shipping Stadium
FC Metalurh Zaporizhzhia	(Ukraine) Oleksandr Tomakh		Metalurh Stadium
FC Nyva Ternopil	(Ukraine) Ihor Yavorskyi		City Stadium
FC Zirka Kirovohrad	(Ukraine) Oleksandr Dovbiy	(Ukraine) Oleksandr Ischenko 22 games (Ukraine) Mykhailo Kalyta 1 game	Zirka Stadium
FC CSKA Kyiv	(Ukraine) Volodymyr Lozynskyi		CSK ZSU Stadium
FC Kryvbas Kryvyi Rih	(Ukraine) Oleksandr Lysenko	(Ukraine) Oleksiy Cherednyk 12 games	Metalurh Stadium
FC Prykarpattia Ivano-Frankivsk	(Ukraine) Viktor Kolotov	(Russia) Boris Streltsov 5 games	Elektron Stadium
FC Torpedo Zaporizhzhia	(Ukraine) Viktor Matvienko	(Ukraine) Ihor Nadein 27 games	AvtoZAZ Stadium
FC Kremin Kremenchuk	(Ukraine) Mykhailo Byelykh		Dnipro Stadium
FC Nyva Vinnytsia	(Ukraine) Oleksandr Ischenko	(Ukraine) Pasha Kasanov 23 games (Ukraine) Volodymyr Reva 2 games	Central City Stadium

Notes: Games between Dynamo Kyiv and CSKA Kyiv were played at the Republican Stadium.

=== Changes ===
Team	Outgoing head coach	Manner of departure	Date of vacancy	Table	Incoming head coach	Date of appointment
FC Shakhtar Donetsk	(Ukraine) Valeriy Rudakov			pre-season	(Ukraine) Valery Yaremchenko	
SC Tavriya Simferopol	(Ukraine) Anatoliy Zayayev			pre-season	(Kazakhstan) Serhiy Shevchenko	
FC CSKA-Borysfen Kyiv	(Ukraine) Viktor Chanov			pre-season	(Germany) Bernd Stange	
FC CSKA Kyiv	(Germany) Bernd Stange			pre-season	(Ukraine) Volodymyr Lozynsky	
FC Karpaty Lviv	(Ukraine) Volodymyr Zhuravchak			pre-season	(Ukraine) Myron Markevych	
FC Dnipro Dnipropetrovsk	(Germany) Bernd Stange			pre-season	(Ukraine) Viacheslav Hrozny	
FC Kryvbas Kryvyi Rih	(Ukraine) Myron Markevych			pre-season	(Ukraine) Oleksiy Cherednyk	
FC Prykarpattia Ivano-Frankivsk	(Ukraine) Ihor Yurchenko			pre-season	(Russia) Boris Streltsov	
FC Kremin Kremenchuk	(Ukraine) Valery Yaremchenko			pre-season	(Ukraine) Mykhailo Bilykh	
FC Nyva Vinnytsia	(Ukraine) Serhiy Morozov			pre-season	(Ukraine) Pasha Kasanov	

== League table ==
Pos	Team	Pld	W	D	L	GF	GA	GD	Pts	Qualification or relegation
1	Dynamo Kyiv (C)	30	23	4	3	69	20	+49	73	Qualification to Champions League first qualifying round
2	Shakhtar Donetsk (Note: Participant of the 1997 Ukrainian Cup Final)	30	19	5	6	72	28	+44	62	Qualification to Cup Winners' Cup qualifying round
3	Vorskla Poltava	30	17	7	6	50	26	+24	58	Qualification to UEFA Cup first qualifying round
4	Dnipro Dnipropetrovsk	30	14	13	3	48	19	+29	55	Qualification to UEFA Cup first qualifying round
5	Karpaty Lviv	30	15	7	8	36	23	+13	52	
6	Tavriya Simferopol	30	13	5	12	36	46	−10	44	
7	Chornomorets Odesa	30	12	6	12	36	31	+5	42	
8	Metalurh Zaporizhzhia	30	12	5	13	48	44	+4	41	
9	Nyva Ternopil	30	11	6	13	34	37	−3	39	
10	Zirka-NIBAS Kirovohrad	30	11	3	16	31	55	−24	36	
11	CSKA Kyiv	30	9	8	13	33	35	−2	35	
12	Kryvbas Kryvyi Rih	30	9	6	15	24	48	−24	33	
13	Prykarpattya Ivano-Frankivsk	30	8	7	15	33	49	−16	31	
14	Torpedo Zaporizhzhia	30	8	5	17	25	56	−31	29	
15	Kremin Kremenchuk (R)	30	7	3	20	28	57	−29	24	Relegated to Ukrainian First League
16	Nyva Vinnytsia (R)	30	4	6	20	19	48	−29	18	Relegated to Ukrainian First League

Source: uafootball.net.ua
Rules for classification: 1st points; 2nd goal difference; 3rd goal scored
(C) Champions; (R) Relegated

== Results ==
Home \ Away	CHO	CSK	DNI	DYN	KAR	KRE	KRY	MZA	NVT	NYV	PRY	SHA	TAV	TZA	VOR	ZIR
Chornomorets Odesa	—	0–0	3–0	1–3	0–0	1–0	0–0	2–1	2–0	0–0	0–0	1–1	5–1	2–0	0–3	5–1
CSKA Kyiv	1–2	—	0–0	0–1	0–1	3–1	1–2	2–1	1–0	1–0	2–1	1–1	2–1	5–1	0–0	1–2
Dnipro	3–2	2–1	—	0–1	0–0	3–0	2–1	4–0	1–0	4–0	4–0	2–0	1–0	4–0	1–1	4–0
Dynamo Kyiv	2–0	2–2	2–2	—	2–0	5–0	5–0	1–2	1–0	2–0	2–1	3–1	3–0	2–1	2–1	6–1
Karpaty Lviv	1–0	1–2	0–0	0–2	—	4–0	5–1	1–0	3–1	1–2	3–1	1–0	1–1	2–0	2–0	2–0
Kremin Kremenchuk	1–0	0–2	1–1	1–4	0–1	—	2–1	4–1	3–2	3–0	2–1	0–1	2–3	1–1	0–4	1–0
Kryvbas Kryvyi Rih	1–0	2–1	0–0	0–2	1–2	1–0	—	1–0	2–0	3–0	1–1	1–3	1–0	2–1	1–1	0–2
Metalurh Zaporizhzhia	1–0	4–2	1–1	0–0	2–0	3–2	1–1	—	4–2	2–0	3–2	1–1	8–1	2–0	2–0	0–1
Nyva Ternopil	2–0	0–0	2–2	1–0	1–1	1–0	2–0	2–1	—	3–0	3–0	1–4	1–0	2–1	1–0	5–1
Nyva Vinnytsia	0–1	2–2	0–2	0–1	0–1	2–1	2–0	0–0	0–0	—	1–2	1–2	0–0	0–0	2–4	3–1
Prykarpattya Ivano-Frankivsk	2–4	0–0	2–2	0–2	1–2	2–0	2–0	3–2	0–0	2–1	—	2–1	1–2	2–1	0–2	0–0
Shakhtar Donetsk	3–0	3–0	1–0	1–3	0–0	4–2	6–0	4–2	5–0	1–0	2–0	—	4–0	9–1	4–0	3–1
Tavriya Simferopol	1–0	2–1	0–0	1–3	3–1	1–1	1–0	3–0	2–1	3–2	2–0	0–2	—	2–1	1–1	1–0
Torpedo Zaporizhzhia	1–2	+:-	1–3	0–0	1–0	1–0	1–0	0–4	0–0	1–0	1–1	2–1	1–3	—	2–3	3–1
Vorskla Poltava	2–1	1–0	0–0	4–3	0–0	2–0	4–0	3–0	2–1	3–0	2–0	1–1	1–0	2–0	—	3–0
Zirka-NIBAS Kirovohrad	0–2	2–0	0–0	0–4	2–0	2–0	1–1	1–0	1–0	2–1	2–4	2–3	2–1	1–2	2–0	—

Source: uafootball.net.ua
Legend: Blue = home team win; Yellow = draw; Red = away team win.

== Top goalscorers ==
Rank	Player	Club	Goals (Pen.)
1	(Ukraine) Oleh Matviiv	Shakhtar Donetsk	21 (6)
2	(Ukraine) Serhii Rebrov	Dynamo Kyiv	20 (6)
3	(Ukraine) Serhiy Chuychenko	Vorskla Poltava	14 (2)
4	(Ukraine) Oleksandr Haidash	Tavriya Simferopol	13
4	(Russia) Andriy Fedkov	Torpedo Zaporizhzhia	13 (3)
6	(Ukraine) Serhiy Mizin	CSKA / Chornomorets	12 (3)
7	(Ukraine) Serhiy Atelkin	Shakhtar Donetsk	11
7	(Ukraine) Valentyn Poltavets	Metalurh Zaporizhzhia	11
7	(Ukraine) Yakiv Kripak	Metalurh Zaporizhzhia	11 (3)
10	(Ukraine) Hennadiy Moroz	Dnipro Dnipropetrovsk	10

== See also ==
- 1996–97 Ukrainian First League
- 1996–97 Ukrainian Second League
- 1996–97 Ukrainian Cup
