= Serhiy Onopko =

Ukrainian footballer (born 1973)

Personal information
- Full name: Serhiy Saveliyovych Onopko
- Date of birth: 26 October 1973 (age 53)
- Place of birth: Voroshilovhrad, Soviet Union (now Luhansk, Ukraine)
- Height: 1.81 m (5 ft 11 in)
- Position: Midfielder

Youth career
- LVUFK Luhansk

Senior career*
Years	Team	Apps	(Gls)
1991–1998	Shakhtar Donetsk	128	(20)
1992–1998	→ Shakhtar-2 Donetsk	41	(12)
1998	Mykolaiv	13	(4)
1999–2004	Vorskla Poltava	123	(12)
1999–2004	→ Vorskla-2 Poltava	21	(3)
2005	Inter Baku	4	(0)
2005	Dnipro Cherkasy	8	(1)
2006	Hirnyk Kryvyi Rih	1	(0)

International career
1992–1994	Ukraine U21	8	(0)
- * Club domestic league appearances and goals

Serhiy Saveliyovych Onopko (Ukrainian: Сергій Савелійович Онопко; born 26 October 1973) is a Ukrainian retired professional footballer who played as a midfielder.

== Club career ==
During his career Onopko played for Shakhtar Donetsk, Mykolaiv, Vorskla Poltava, Inter Baku, Dnipro Cherkasy and Hirnyk Kryvyi Rih.

== Personal life ==
He is a younger brother of Viktor Onopko.

== Honours ==
Shakhtar Donetsk

- Ukrainian Premier League runner-up: 1993–94, 1996–97, 1997–98
- Ukrainian Cup: 1994–95, 1996–97
