= Aleksandr Pavlenko =

Aleksandr Pavlenko may refer to:

- Oleksandr Pavlenko (1941–1995), Ukrainian football manager and former defender
- Alexander Pavlenko (born 1971), Russian murderer
- Aleksandr Pavlenko (footballer, born 1985), Russian football manager and former attacking midfielder
- Aleksandr Pavlenko (footballer, born 1976), Russian football manager and former forward
