= Valeriy Yaremchenko =

Ukrainian footballer (born 1947)

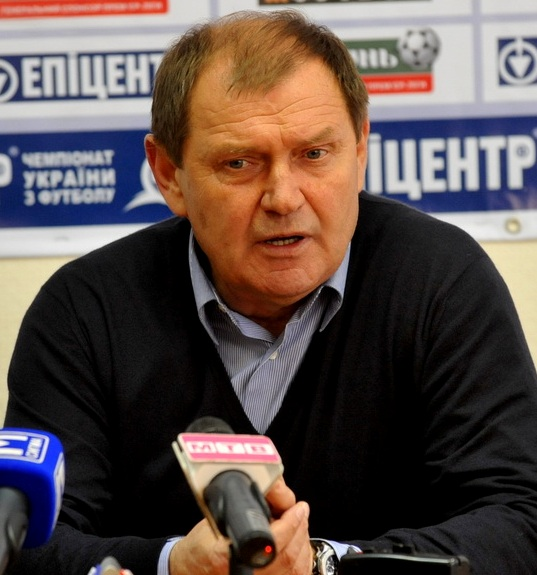

Personal information
- Full name: Valeriy Ivanovych Yaremchenko
- Date of birth: 15 August 1947 (age 79)
- Place of birth: Kryvyi Rih, Ukraine, Soviet Union
- Height: 1.77 m (5 ft 10 in)
- Position: Defender

Youth career
- –1965: Hirnyk Kryvyi Rih

Senior career*
Years	Team	Apps	(Gls)
1965–1966	Kryvbas Kryvyi Rih	29	(12)
1966–1978	Shakhtar Donetsk	297	(26)
Total		326	(38)

Managerial career
- 1980: Energiya Kurakhovo
- 1982–1984: Shakhtar Donetsk (assistant)
- 1985–1987: Syria
- 1988: Shakhtar Donetsk (assistant)
- 1988–1989: Shakhtar Donetsk (academy)
- 1989–1994: Shakhtar Donetsk
- 1995: Kolos Krasnodar
- 1996: Kremin Kremenchuk
- 1996–1999: Shakhtar Donetsk
- 1999–2001: Shakhtar Donetsk (assistant)
- 2001–2002: Shakhtar Donetsk (caretaker)
- 2002–2003: Shakhtar Donetsk
- 2004: Rotor Volgograd
- 2004–2005: Metalurh Zaporizhzhia
- 2007–2008: Karpaty Lviv
- 2008–2010: Shakhtar Donetsk reserves
- 2010–2011: Illichivets Mariupol
- 2016: Karpaty Lviv
- * Club domestic league appearances and goals

Valeriy Ivanovych Yaremchenko (Ukrainian: Валерій Іванович Яремченко; born 15 August 1947) is a Ukrainian former football manager and player.

== Career ==
Yaremchenko was born in the city of Kryvyi Rih, Ukraine. As a player, he participated in 247 games as a member of Shakhtar Donetsk scoring 24 goals. He coached Syria (1985–87), Shakhtar Donetsk (1989–94, 2001–03), Kremin (1994), Kolos Krasnodar (1995), Rotor Volgograd (2004), Metalurh Z Zaporizhia (2004–05). He was made honorary coach of Ukraine in 1993.

== Career statistics ==
Appearances and goals by club, season and competition
Club	Season	League		Cup		Europe		Total	
Club	Season	Apps	Goals	Apps	Goals	Apps	Goals	Apps	Goals
Shakhtar Donetsk	1966	2	0	0	0	0	0	2	0
Shakhtar Donetsk	1967	0	0	0	0	0	0	0	0
Shakhtar Donetsk	1968	28	2	3	1	0	0	31	3
Shakhtar Donetsk	1969	20	4	0	0	0	0	20	4
Shakhtar Donetsk	1970	28	5	0	0	0	0	28	5
Shakhtar Donetsk	1971	27	9	3	1	0	0	30	10
Shakhtar Donetsk	1972	31	2	0	0	0	0	31	2
Shakhtar Donetsk	1973	27	0	3	0	0	0	30	0
Shakhtar Donetsk	1974	27	1	7	0	0	0	34	1
Shakhtar Donetsk	1975	25	1	1	0	0	0	26	1
Shakhtar Donetsk	1976 (a)	15	1	4	0	0	0	19	1
Shakhtar Donetsk	1976 (s)	12	1	0	0	6	0	18	1
Shakhtar Donetsk	1977	28	0	3	0	0	0	31	0
Shakhtar Donetsk	1978	27	0	8	1	2	0	38	1
Total		297	26	32	3	8	0	337	29

== Honours ==
=== Player ===
Shakhtar Donetsk

- Soviet Top League: runner-up 1975; third place 1978
- Soviet Cup runner-up: 1978

=== Manager ===
Shakhtar Donetsk

- Ukrainian Premier League runner-up: 1993–94, 1996–97, 1997–98, 2002–03
- Ukrainian Cup: 1996–97
