= Leonid Koltun =

Ukrainian football manager (born 1944)

Personal information
- Full name: Leonid Yakovlevych Koltun
- Date of birth: 7 September 1944 (age 82)
- Place of birth: Kharkiv, USSR
- Position: Goalkeeper

Youth career
- 1960–1963: Avanhard Kharkiv

Senior career*
Years	Team	Apps	(Gls)
1963–1965	Avanhard Kharkiv	43	(0)
1965–1967	Sudnobudivnyk Mykolaiv	61	(0)
1968–1970	Zirka Kirovohrad	63	(0)
1970–1977	Dnipro Dnipropetrovsk	163	(0)
1978	Zirka Kirovohrad	24	(0)

Managerial career
- 1979: Dnipro Dnipropetrovsk (assistant)
- 1979: Dnipro Dnipropetrovsk
- 1979–1981: Dnipro Dnipropetrovsk (assistant)
- 1981: Dnipro Dnipropetrovsk
- 1981–1990: Dnipro Dnipropetrovsk (assistant)
- 1991: Rotor Volgograd
- 1992: Vorskla Poltava
- 1992–1993: Nyva Ternopil
- 1993–1994: Evis Mykolaiv
- 1994: Khimik Zhytomyr
- 1995–1996: Metalurh Zaporizhia (assistant)
- 1996–1998: Zenit Saint Petersburg (assistant)
- 1998–1999: Torpedo Zaporizhia
- 1999: Dnipro Dnipropetrovsk
- 1999–2000: Borysfen Boryspil (technical director)
- 2000–2004: Jiangsu Sainty
- 2006: Rotor Volgograd (assistant)
- 2007: Rotor Volgograd
- 2008: Sevastopol (sporting director)
- 2011: Jiangsu Youth
- * Club domestic league appearances and goals

Leonid Koltun (Ukrainian: Леонід Колтун; born 7 September 1944) is a Ukrainian football coach and former player.

== Coaching record ==
Season Division	Club	Record W-D-L	Goals GF–GA	Standing	Notes
1992; Division 1	Nyva T.	8-5-5	16-12	4/10	
92/93; Division 1	Nyva T.	3-4-8	8-12		replaced by Leonid Buryak
