= Ihor Moiseyev =

Ukrainian footballer

Personal information
- Full name: Ihor Oleksandrovych Moiseyev
- Date of birth: 16 May 1964 (age 62)
- Place of birth: Zhdanov, Ukrainian SSR
- Height: 1.90 m (6 ft 3 in)
- Position: Goalkeeper

Youth career
- DYuSSh Zhdanov

Senior career*
Years	Team	Apps	(Gls)
1983–1986	Novator Zhdanov	102	(0)
1987	Shakhtar Donetsk	0	(0)
1987–1991	Metalurh Zaporizhzhia	104	(0)
1992–1993	Torpedo Zaporizhzhia	31	(0)
1993	Dnipro Dnipropetrovsk	1	(0)
1993–1995	Asmaral Moscow	63	(0)
1993–1994	→ Asmaral-d Moscow (loans)	9	(0)
1998–2001	ZALK Zaporizhzhia		
2005	ZALK Zaporizhzhia		
- * Club domestic league appearances and goals

Ihor Oleksandrovych Moiseyev (Ukrainian: Ігор Олександрович Моісеєв; born 16 May 1964) is a Ukrainian former football player.

== Honours ==
Dnipro Dnipropetrovsk

- Ukrainian Premier League runner-up: 1992–93
