= Oleg Chukhleba =

Kazakhstani footballer

Personal information
- Full name: Oleg Nikolayevich Chukhleba
- Date of birth: 5 November 1967 (age 58)
- Place of birth: Petropavlovsk, Kazakh SSR
- Height: 1.75 m (5 ft 9 in)
- Positions: Defender; midfielder

Senior career*
Years	Team	Apps	(Gls)
1984	Avangard Petropavlovsk	7	(0)
1990	Metallist Petropavlovsk	31	(6)
1990–1991	FC Kairat	42	(3)
1992	FC Zorya-MALS Luhansk	11	(1)
1992–1994	FC Dnipro Dnipropetrovsk	36	(0)
1994–1996	FC Lada Togliatti	59	(3)
1996	FC Lokomotiv Nizhny Novgorod	1	(0)
1997–1998	FC Yelimay Semipalatinsk	37	(2)
1999	FC Access-Esil	21	(2)
2000	FC Volna Kaliningrad		
2001	FC Yelimay Semipalatinsk	24	(0)
2002–2003	FC Esil Bogatyr	34	(1)
2003	FC Neman Kaliningrad		
- * Club domestic league appearances and goals

Oleg Nikolayevich Chukhleba (Russian: Олег Николаевич Чухлеба; born 5 November 1967) is a former Kazakhstani football player.
