= Bohdan Strontsitskyi =

Soviet and Ukrainian footballer

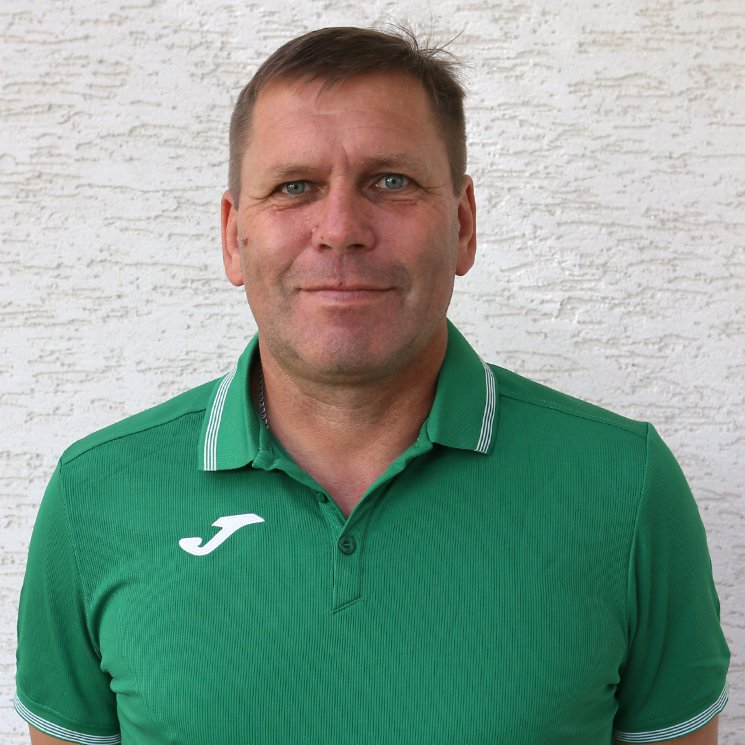

Personal information
- Full name: Bohdan Eduardovych Strontsitskyi
- Date of birth: 13 January 1968 (age 58)
- Place of birth: Lviv, Ukrainian SSR
- Height: 1.85 m (6 ft 1 in)
- Position: Goalkeeper

Team information
- Current team: Karpaty Lviv (goalkeeping coach)

Senior career*
Years	Team	Apps	(Gls)
1987	LVVPU		
1989	Krystal Kherson	2	(0)
1989–1992	Karpaty K-B/Skala Stryi	44	(1)
1992–2002	Karpaty Lviv	184	(0)
1997–2002	→ Karpaty-2 Lviv	14	(0)
2001	→ Karpaty-3 Lviv	3	(0)
2002–2003	Tavriya Simferopol	14	(0)
2003–2004	Spartak Ivano-Frankivsk	10	(0)
2004	→ Spartak-2 Kalush	1	(0)
Total		272	(1)

Managerial career
- 2004: Spartak Ivano-Frankivsk (assistant)
- 2005–2010: Karpaty Lviv (goalkeeping coach)
- 2010–2011: Krymteplytsia Molodizhne (goalkeeping coach)
- 2011–2012: Nyva Ternopil (caretaker)
- 2015: Nyva Ternopil (goalkeeping coach)
- 2016–2017: Karpaty Lviv U19 (goalkeeping coach)
- 2017–: Karpaty Lviv (goalkeeping coach)
- * Club domestic league appearances and goals

Bohdan Eduardovych Strontsitsky (Ukrainian: Богдан Едуардович Стронціцький; born 13 January 1968) is a retired Soviet and Ukrainian professional footballer.
