= Vasiliy Kurilov =

Belarusian footballer

Personal information
- Full name: Vasiliy Ivanovich Kurilov
- Date of birth: 30 November 1947
- Place of birth: Brest, Belarusian SSR
- Date of death: 12 November 2019 (aged 71)
- Place of death: Brest, Belarus
- Height: 1.80 m (5 ft 11 in)
- Position: Midfielder

Senior career*
Years	Team	Apps	(Gls)
1965	Spartak Brest	1	(0)
1966–1968	Dinamo Minsk	27	(4)
1969–1970	Metalurh Zaporizhzhia	29	(3)
1972	Avanhard Rivne		
1973–1974	Kolos Poltava	30	(4)
1975–1978	Dinamo Brest	153	(24)

Managerial career
- 1978–1981: Dinamo Brest (assistant)
- 1982: Dinamo Brest
- 1992: Veres Rivne
- 1993–1994: Dinamo Brest
- * Club domestic league appearances and goals

Vasiliy Kurilov (Russian: Василий Иванович Курилов; 30 November 1947 – 12 November 2019) was a Soviet football midfielder and coach from Belarus.
