= Andrei Pavlenko =

Andrei Pavlenko may refer to:

- Andrei Pavlenko (footballer) (born 1986), Russian footballer
- Andrei Pavlenko (ice hockey) (born 2000), Belarusian ice hockey player
