= Volodymyr Stryzhevskyi =

Ukrainian footballer (1953–2023)

Volodymyr Stryzhevskyi Володимир Стрижевський
Personal information
- Date of birth: 4 May 1953
- Place of birth: Drohobych, Lviv Oblast, Ukrainian SSR, USSR
- Date of death: 15 November 2023 (aged 70)
- Place of death: Dnipro, Ukraine
- Position: Goalkeeper

Youth career
- Torpedo Lutsk

Senior career*
Years	Team	Apps	(Gls)
1972–1973	SC Lutsk		(0)
1974	Zirka Kirovohrad	16	(0)
1975	Khvylya Khmelnytskyi		(0)
1976	Dynamo Kyiv		(0)
1977–1981	Dnipro Dnipropetrovsk	17	(0)
1980	→ Kryvbas Kryvyi Rih (loan)	10	(0)
1982–1984	Kolos Mezhyrich	128	(0)
1985–1987	Kryvbas Kryvyi Rih	87	(0)

Managerial career
- 1987–1991: Dnipro Dnipropetrovsk (staff)
- 1992: Kryvbas Kryvyi Rih
- 1993: Veres Rivne
- 1994–1995: Podillya Khmelnytskyi
- 1996–1998: Zirka Kirovohrad (assistant)
- 1999–2000: Access-Esil Petropavlovsk
- 2001–2003: Volyn Lutsk (assistant)
- 2004: Esil-Bogatyr Petropavlovsk
- 2004–: Dnipro Dnipropetrovsk (staff)
- * Club domestic league appearances and goals

Volodymyr Serhiyovych Stryzhevskyi (Ukrainian: Володимир Сергійович Стрижевський; 4 May 1953 – 15 November 2023) was a Soviet and Ukrainian football player, coach, and manager. He died on 15 November 2023, at the age of 70.

Stryzhevskyi was a product of the Torpedo Lutsk football academy (today Volyn Lutsk). He began playing for the club's first team in 1971.

In 1976, he was invited to Dynamo Kyiv, but it was impossible to break into the main team. And then Stryzhevskyi moved to Dnipro.

He played for Dnipro during its crisis period of 1977-81. Together with the club, he went through relegation from the Vysshaya Liga (Soviet Top League), two years in the Pervaya Liga (Soviet First League) and a return to the top division. In total he played 17 matches, conceding 18 goals. He finished his career as a goalkeeper in Kolos Pavlohrad and Kryvbas.

Volodymyr Stryzhevskyi began his coaching career in 1987 as a goalkeeper coach. In the 1990s, he was the head coach of Kryvbas and Podillia Khmelnytskyi. Then he worked in Kazakhstan for 5 years.

Returning to Dnipro in 2004, he worked with children’s and youth teams of FC Dnipro.
