= Vasyl Demydyak =

Ukrainian footballer

Personal information
- Full name: Vasyl Yaroslavovych Demydyak
- Date of birth: 22 January 1978 (age 48)
- Place of birth: Ternopil, Soviet Union (now Ukraine)
- Height: 1.78 m (5 ft 10 in)
- Position: Midfielder

Youth career
- Nyva Ternopil
- LDUFK Lviv
- Dynamo Kyiv

Senior career*
Years	Team	Apps	(Gls)
1994–1995	Nyva Ternopil	9	(1)
1995–1996	Krystal Chortkiv	6	(1)
1996	Nyva Ternopil	9	(0)
1996	Chornomorets Odesa	1	(0)
1996–1997	Nyva Vinnytsia	7	(1)
1997	CSKA Kyiv	1	(0)
1997	→ CSKA-2 Kyiv	18	(5)
1997–2001	Ukrainian Lions		
- * Club domestic league appearances and goals as of 12 June 2023

Vasyl Yaroslavovych Demydyak (Ukrainian: Василь Ярославович Демидяк; born 22 January 1978) is a Ukrainian retired professional footballer who played as a midfielder.

== Career ==
Since 10 September 1994, Demydyak holds the record of being the youngest goalscorer of the Ukrainian Premier League when at the age of 16 years and 231 days scored for Nyva Ternopil against Tavriya Simferopol.
