= Mikheil Potskhveria =

Georgian footballer

Personal information
- Date of birth: 12 August 1975 (age 51)
- Place of birth: Kurundus, Toguchinsky District, Novosibirsk Oblast, Russian SFSR
- Height: 1.81 m (5 ft 11 in)
- Position: Forward

Senior career*
Years	Team	Apps	(Gls)
1991	Khimik Sievierodonetsk	6	(0)
1992–1993	Dynamo Luhansk	8	(1)
1993	Rostselmash-2	8	(1)
1993–1994	Zorya-MALS Luhansk	37	(5)
1994–1995	Metalurh Zaporizhzhia	31	(18)
1995–1996	Werder Bremen II	7	(0)
1996–2000	Shakhtar Donetsk	65	(19)
1997–1998	→ Shakhtar-2 Donetsk	13	(3)
1999	→ Dnipro Dnipropetrovsk (loan)	10	(3)
1999	→ Shakhtar-2 Donetsk	7	(1)
2000	Alania Vladikavkaz	7	(0)
2000	Dnipro Dnipropetrovsk	7	(0)
2001–2002	Merani Tbilisi	6	(0)

International career
1996–1997	Georgia U21	6	(1)
1996–1999	Georgia	4	(0)
- * Club domestic league appearances and goals

Mikheil Potskhveria (Georgian: მიხეილ ფოცხვერია; born 12 August 1975) is a Georgian former professional footballer who played as a forward.
