= Hryhoriy Vul =

Ukrainian footballer

Hryhoriy Vul (Ukrainian: Григорій Семенович Вуль) is a Ukrainian football coach and former player who played as a midfielder.
