= Viktor Aristov (footballer) =

Ukrainian football player and manager (1938–2023)

Personal information
- Full name: Viktor Oleksandrovych Aristov
- Date of birth: 14 August 1938
- Place of birth: Mikhaylov, Ryazan Oblast, Russian SFSR, USSR
- Date of death: 14 February 2023 (aged 84)
- Height: 1.82 m (6 ft 0 in)
- Positions: Striker; defender

Senior career*
Years	Team	Apps	(Gls)
1960	Volgar Astrakhan	14	(1)
1960–1962	Energiya Volzhsky	34	(1)
1962	Avangard Simferopol	10	(0)
1963–1965	SKA Odesa	76	(14)
1966	Lokomotiv Vinnytsia	30	(0)
1967–1973	Metalist Kharkiv	254	(2)
Total		418	(18)

Managerial career
- 1973–1983: Metalist Kharkiv Sport School
- 1983–1984: Kharkiv city sport school
- 1984–1992: Metalist Kharkiv (staff)
- 1993: Metalist Kharkiv
- 1993: Evis Mykolaiv (staff)
- 1994: SBTS Sumy
- 1994–1995: Polihraftekhnika Oleksandria (staff)
- 1996: Zoria-MALS Luhansk
- 1997: Luch Vladivostok
- 2004–2007: Metalist Kharkiv (staff)
- * Club domestic league appearances and goals

Viktor Oleksandrovych Aristov (Ukrainian: Віктор Олександрович Арістов; 14 August 1938 – 14 February 2023) was a Ukrainian football coach and player.
