= Mykola Medin =

Ukrainian footballer

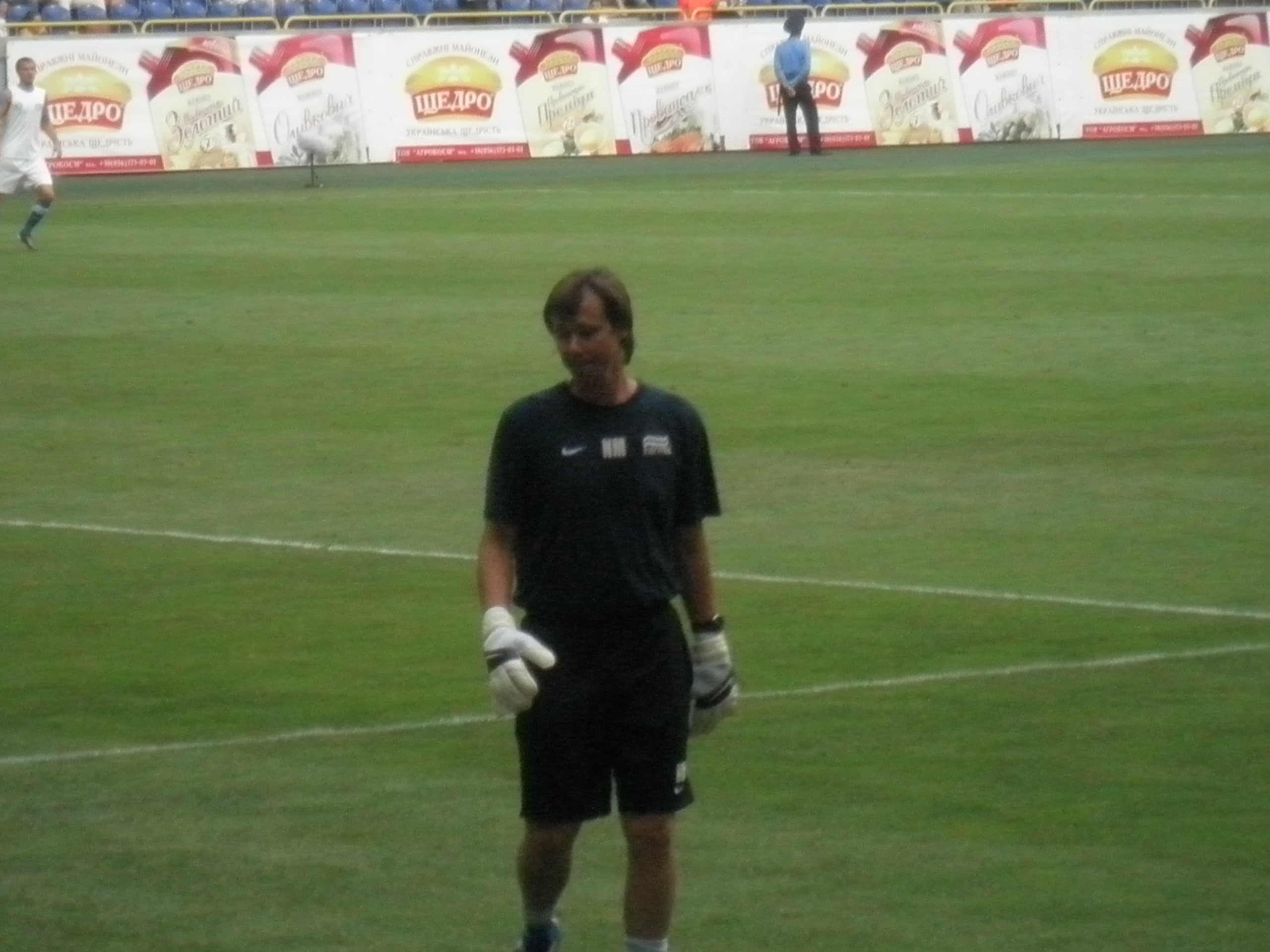
- Mykola Medin in 2010

Personal information
- Full name: Mykola Oleksandrovych Medin
- Date of birth: 4 May 1972 (age 54)
- Place of birth: Nikopol, Dnipropetrovsk Oblast, Ukrainian SSR
- Height: 1.84 m (6 ft 1/2 in)
- Position: Goalkeeper

Team information
- Current team: Dnipro (goalies coach)

Senior career*
| Years | Team | Apps | (Gls) |
| 1988–1995 | Dnipro Dnipropetrovsk | 86 | (0) |
| 1994 | → Metalurh Nikopol (loan) | 5 | (0) |
| 1997 | Uralan Elista | 20 | (0) |
| 1998–2005 | Dnipro Dnipropetrovsk | 119 | (0) |
| 1998–2004 | → Dnipro-2 Dnipropetrovsk (loan) | 27 | (0) |
| 2002 | → Dnipro-3 Dnipropetrovsk (loan) | 1 | (0) |
| 2006 | Tavriya Simferopol | 0 | (0) |
| Total | | 258 | (0) |

Managerial career
- 2007–2017: Dnipro (youth goalkeeping coach)
- 2017–: Dnipro (goalkeeping coach)
- * Club domestic league appearances and goals

Mykola Medin (born May 4, 1972 in Nikopol) is a Ukrainian professional football coach and a former player.

Currently, he is a goalie manager with the FC Dnipro.

== Honours ==
Top awards

- Soviet Top League champion: 1988.
- Soviet Cup winner: 1989.
- USSR Super Cup winner: 1989.
- USSR Federation Cup winner: 1989.

Minor awards

- Soviet Top League runner-up: 1989.
- USSR Federation Cup finalist: 1990.
- Ukrainian Premier League runner-up: 1993.
- Ukrainian Premier League bronze: 1992, 1995, 1996.
