= Andriy Telesnenko =

Ukrainian footballer (born 1966)

Andriy Telesnenko Андрій Телесненко
Personal information
- Full name: Andriy Vasylyovych Telesnenko
- Date of birth: 12 April 1966 (age 60)
- Place of birth: Odesa, Ukrainian SSR
- Height: 1.81 m (5 ft 11 in)
- Position: Defender

Youth career
- SSSOR Chornomorets Odesa
- 1983–1987: Chornomorets Odesa

Senior career*
Years	Team	Apps	(Gls)
1987	Sudnobudivnyk Mykolaiv	50	(0)
1988–1992	Chornomorets Odesa	51	(3)
1992	Oulu	30	(5)
1992	Chornomorets Odesa	3	(1)
1993	Oulu	22	(1)
1993–1995	Chornomorets Odesa	50	(2)
1995–1996	Hapoel Be'er Sheva	21	(0)
1997	Gazovik-Gazprom Izhevsk	31	(0)
1997–2001	Zimbru Chișinău	97	(1)
2001–2003	Dnister Ovidiopol	77	(1)

International career
1994–1995	Ukraine	3	(0)

Managerial career
- 2003–2006: Dnister Ovidiopol (assistant)
- 2006: Chornomorets Odesa (assistant)
- 2007: Chornomorets Odesa (reserves)
- 2007–2008: Chornomorets Odesa (assistant)
- 2008–2010: Chornomorets Odesa (scout)
- 2010–2011: Chornomorets Odesa (assistant)
- 2011–2017: Chornomorets Odesa (scout)
- 2018: Chornomorets Odesa (U21 assistant)
- * Club domestic league appearances and goals

Andriy Vasylyovych Telesnenko (Ukrainian: Андрій Васильович Телесненко; born 12 April 1966) is a Ukrainian former professional footballer who played as a defender.
