= Vitaliy Ponomarenko (footballer) =

Ukrainian footballer

Personal information
- Full name: Vitaliy Mykolayovych Ponomarenko
- Date of birth: 23 January 1969 (age 57)
- Place of birth: Kyiv, Ukrainian SSR, Soviet Union
- Height: 1.75 m (5 ft 9 in)
- Position: Defender

Youth career
- Dynamo Kyiv

Senior career*
Years	Team	Apps	(Gls)
1987–1988	Dynamo Kyiv	0	(0)
1989–1991	Dynamo Bila Tserkva	107	(5)
1992–1994	Dynamo Kyiv	34	(0)
1992–1994	→ Dynamo-2 Kyiv	53	(1)
1994	Boryspil	2	(0)
1994	CSKA-Borysfen Kyiv	18	(0)
1995–1996	Dinamo-Gazovik Tyumen	38	(3)
1997	Uralan Elista	20	(0)
- * Club domestic league appearances and goals

Vitaliy Mykolayovych Ponomarenko (Ukrainian: Віталій Миколайович Пономаренко; Russian: Виталий Николаевич Пономаренко; born 23 January 1969) is a former Ukrainian professional footballer.

== Club career ==
He made his professional debut in 1988 for FC Dynamo Kyiv in the USSR Federation Cup.

== Honours ==
- Ukrainian Premier League champion: 1993, 1994.
- Ukrainian Cup winner: 1993.
