= Yakiv Kripak =

Ukrainian footballer and manager

Personal information
- Full name: Yakiv Viktorovych Kripak
- Date of birth: 13 June 1978 (age 48)
- Place of birth: Zaporizhya, Ukrainian SSR
- Height: 1.79 m (5 ft 10 1/2 in)
- Position: Midfielder

Youth career
- 1990–1995: Metalurh Zaporizhya

Senior career*
Years	Team	Apps	(Gls)
1996–1997	Metalurh Zaporizhya	55	(20)
1998–1999	CSKA Kyiv	27	(7)
1998	→ CSKA-2 Kyiv	3	(1)
1999–2002	Shakhtar Donetsk	3	(0)
1999	→ Shakhtar-2 Donetsk	10	(0)
2000	→ Metalurh Donetsk (loan)	16	(1)
2001	→ Stal Alchevsk (loan)	11	(2)
2001	→ Stal-2 Alchevsk (loan)	12	(2)
2001	→ Polihraftekhnika Oleksandria (loan)	1	(0)
2002	ZAlK Zaporizhya	5	(7)
2002–2003	Dnipro Dnipropetrovsk	6	(0)
2002	→ Dnipro-2 Dnipropetrovsk	2	(0)
2004	Lokomotiv Vitebsk	30	(11)
2005	ZAlK Zaporizhya	3	(2)
2005–2006	Spartak Sumy	24	(2)
2006	ZAlK Zaporizhya		
2007	Desna Chernihiv	6	(0)
2008	Feniks-Illichovets Kalinine	0	(0)
2008–2009	Slavkhlib Slovyansk	3	(2)
2010–2011	Avanhard Kramatorsk	13	(0)

International career
1997	Ukraine U21	7	(2)

Managerial career
- 2012–2013: Avanhard Kramatorsk (assistant)
- 2013–2016: Avanhard Kramatorsk
- * Club domestic league appearances and goals

Yakiv Kripak (Ukrainian: Яків Вікторович Кріпак; born 13 June 1978 in Zaporizhya, in the Ukrainian SSR of the Soviet Union - in present-day Ukraine) is a Ukrainian former footballer who played as a midfielder.

== Career ==
Kripak is the product of FC Metalurh Zaporizhya's youth sportive school system. His first trainer was Ravil Sharipov.

After retired from playing career, he became an assistant coach in FC Avanhard Kramatorsk in the Ukrainian First League. On 3 December 2013 Kripak was appointed as the main coach of the same club.

He worked a coach of FC Avanhard Kramatorsk in the Ukrainian First League.
