= Ruslan Uzakov =

Uzbekistani footballer and manager

Personal information
- Full name: Ruslan Yarkulovich Uzakov
- Date of birth: 6 March 1967 (age 59)
- Place of birth: Navoiy, Uzbek SSR
- Height: 1.82 m (5 ft 11 1/2 in)
- Position: Defender

Youth career
- FC Zarafshan Navoi

Senior career*
Years	Team	Apps	(Gls)
1984–1990	FC Zarafshan Navoi	207	(12)
1991	Pakhtakor Tashkent FK	20	(0)
1992–1993	Torpedo Zaporizhzhia	39	(0)
1994	Shakhtar Donetsk	3	(0)
1994	FC Shakhtyor Shakhty	31	(5)
1995–2001	FC Nosta Novotroitsk	209	(52)
2002	FC Gazovik Orenburg	26	(4)
2003–2004	FC Nosta Novotroitsk	52	(10)

International career
1997–1999	Uzbekistan	3	(0)

Managerial career
- 2013–2016: FC Chelyabinsk (assistant)
- 2016–2017: FC Chelyabinsk
- 2017–2018: FC Chelyabinsk (assistant)
- 2018: FC Chelyabinsk
- * Club domestic league appearances and goals

Ruslan Yarkulovich Uzakov (Russian: Руслан Яркулович Узаков; born 6 March 1967) is an Uzbekistani football manager and a former player. He also holds Russian citizenship.
