= Aneta Pavlenko =

Ukrainian-American linguist

Aneta Pavlenko is a Ukrainian-American linguist, specializing in the study of bilingualism, particularly the relations between bilingualism and cognition and emotion. She is a professor of education at Temple University.

== Life ==
Pavlenko arrived in the United States as a refugee in 1990, having escaped Ukraine due to anti-Semitic discrimination and the fear of a pogrom. She has written numerous articles and books about multilingualism in post-Soviet Eastern Europe. She was president of the American Association for Applied Linguistics from 2014–15. Pavlenko won the 2009 TESOL Award for Distinguished Research, and the British Association for Applied Linguistics 2006 Best Book of the Year Award for her book Emotions and Multilingualism. In 2015 she published the book The Bilingual Mind. She frequently blogs about bilingualism at Psychologytoday.com.
