= Pasha Kasanov =

Soviet footballer and Ukrainian coach (1953–2025)

Personal information
- Full name: Pasha Namazovych Kasanov
- Date of birth: 19 January 1953
- Place of birth: Tavrichanka, Primorsky Krai, Russian SFSR, Soviet Union
- Date of death: 31 December 2025 (aged 72)
- Position: Midfielder

Youth career
- Youth School of Team "Sudnobudivnyk"

Senior career*
Years	Team	Apps	(Gls)
1976–1986	Nyva Vinnytsia	429	(115)
1987	Metalurh Zaporizhya	27	(2)
1987–1989	Nyva Vinnytsia	94	(14)
1990	Polissya Zhytomyr	22	(11)

Managerial career
- 1992–1994: Nyva Vinnytsia (assistant)
- 1995–1996: Svitanok Vinnytsia (president)
- 1996–1997: Nyva Vinnytsia
- 1997–2005: Svitanok Vinnytsia (president)
- 2006–2008: Nyva-Svitanok Vinnytsia (director)
- 2008–2012: Nyva Vinnytsia (chairman)
- * Club domestic league appearances and goals

Pasha Namazovych Kasanov (Ukrainian: Паша Намазович Касанов; 19 January 1953 – 31 December 2025) was a Ukrainian football player and coach. He died on 31 December 2025, at the age of 72.
