= Boris Streltsov =

Russian footballer (born 1943)

Boris Nikolayevich Streltsov (Russian: Борис Николаевич Стрельцов; born 11 December 1943) is a Russian football coach and former player.

== Playing career ==
Streltsov is from Kyrgyzstan. A forward, he started out his playing career in 1961 in FC Alga Bishkek. He retired in 1975 with FC Spartak Ivano-Frankivsk. During his playing career Streltsov also played for the football team of Kyrgyz SSR.

== Coaching career ==
Streltsov is a Master of Sports of the Soviet Union and Merited Coach of Russia.

In 1976, he became an assistant coach for Spartak. With the fall of the Soviet Union, Streltsov ended up in Ukraine coaching FC Kremin Kremenchuk, but later returned to Russia. The latest club that he coached was FC Kyrgyz-Ata out of Nookatsky District in 2016.
