= Oleksandr Pavlenko =

Ukrainian-Soviet footballer and coach

Personal information
- Date of birth: 26 March 1941
- Place of birth: Ternopil, Ukrainian SSR, USSR
- Date of death: 11 January 1994 (aged 52)
- Place of death: Chernivtsi, Ukraine
- Position: Midfielder

Senior career*
Years	Team	Apps	(Gls)
1962–1963	Naftovyk Drohobych	27	(1)
1963	Chornomorets Odesa	11	(0)
1964–1965	Lokomotiv Vinnitsa	42	(1)
1966–1971	Bukovyna Chernivtsi	120+	(12+)

Managerial career
- 1972–1973: Bukovyna Chernivtsi
- 1976–1978: Bukovyna Chernivtsi (assistant)
- 1981–1985: Bukovyna Chernivtsi
- 1989–1990: Nyva Ternopil
- 1992: Bukovyna Chernivtsi (assistant)
- 1992–1994: Bukovyna Chernivtsi
- * Club domestic league appearances and goals

Oleksandr Georgyovich Pavlenko (Ukrainian: Олекса́ндр Гео́ргійович Павле́нко) was a Soviet footballer and coach from Ukraine.
