= 2015 Ukrainian Cup final =

- Event: 2014–15 Ukrainian Cup
Dynamo Kyiv	Shakhtar Donetsk
0	0
- Dynamo Kyiv won 5–4 on penalties
- Date: 4 June 2015
- Venue: NSC Olimpiyskiy, Kyiv
- Referee: Yuriy Mozharovsky
- Attendance: 53,455
- Weather: +26°C

The 2015 Ukrainian Cup final was a football match that was played on 4 June 2015 in Kyiv. The match was the 24th Ukrainian Cup Final and is contested by Cup holders Dynamo Kyiv and Shakhtar Donetsk, making it part of the National Classic football game.

== Road to Kyiv ==
All 14 Ukrainian Premier League clubs do not have to go qualify to enter the competition; Dynamo and Shakhtar therefore both qualified automatically.

Dynamo Kyiv

Round 1	Zirka Kirovohrad	1 – 3	Dynamo Kyiv
Round 2 (1st leg)	Karpaty Lviv	0 – 1	Dynamo Kyiv
Round 2 (2nd leg)	Dynamo Kyiv	1 – 0	Karpaty Lviv
	(Dynamo won 2–0 on aggregate)		
Quarter-final (1st leg)	Zorya Luhansk	1 – 2	Dynamo Kyiv
Quarter-final (2nd leg)	Dynamo Kyiv	2 – 0	Zorya Luhansk
	(Dynamo won 4–1 on aggregate)		
Semi-final (1st leg)	Olimpik Donetsk	0 – 0	Dynamo Kyiv
Semi-final (2nd leg)	Dynamo Kyiv	4 – 1	Olimpik Donetsk
	(Dynamo won 4–1 on aggregate)		

Shakhtar Donetsk

Round 1	Obolon-Brovar Kyiv	0 – 1	Shakhtar Donetsk
Round 2 (1st leg)	Poltava	1 – 5	Shakhtar Donetsk
Round 2 (2nd leg)	Shakhtar Donetsk	4 – 1	Poltava
	(Shakhtar won 9–2 on aggregate)		
Quarter-final (1st leg)	Metalist Kharkiv	0 – 2	Shakhtar Donetsk
Quarter-final (2nd leg)	Shakhtar Donetsk	1 – 0	Metalist Kharkiv
	(Shakhtar won 3–0 on aggregate)		
Semi-final (1st leg)	Dnipro	0 – 1	Shakhtar Donetsk
Semi-final (2nd leg)	Shakhtar Donetsk	1 – 1	Dnipro Dnipropetrovsk
	(Shakhtar won 2–1 on aggregate)		

== Previous encounters ==
This was the eighth Ukrainian Cup Final between the two teams and repeat of last years Cup Final. Dynamo has defeated Shakhtar five times out of the seven Cup Finals.

Dynamo had appeared in 13 Cup Finals winning 10 trophies and opponents Shakhtar had appeared in 14 Cup Finals winning 9.

== Match ==
=== Details ===
4 June 2015
21:00

Dynamo Kyiv	0–0 (a.e.t.)	Shakhtar Donetsk
	Report
Penalties
Veloso (penalty missed); Dragović (penalty scored); Antunes (penalty missed); Husyev (penalty scored); Yarmolenko (penalty scored); Belhanda (penalty scored); Khacheridi (penalty scored)	5–4	(penalty scored) Srna; (penalty scored) Luiz Adriano; (penalty scored) Douglas Costa; (penalty missed) Taison; (penalty missed) Rakytskiy; (penalty scored) Teixeira; (penalty missed) Hladkyy

NSC Olimpiyskiy, Kyiv
Attendance: 53,455
Referee: Yuriy Mozharovsky (Lviv)

Dynamo Kyiv	Shakhtar Donetsk

Dynamo Kyiv:
GK	1	(Ukraine) Oleksandr Shovkovskyi (c)
RB	2	(Brazil) Danilo Silva	(substituted off) 46'
CB	24	(Croatia) Domagoj Vida	(yellow card) 88'
CB	6	(Austria) Aleksandar Dragović	(yellow card) 68'
LB	34	(Ukraine) Yevhen Khacheridi	(yellow card) 82'
CM	17	(Ukraine) Serhiy Rybalka	(yellow card) 81' (yellow-red card) 115'
CM	4	(Portugal) Miguel Veloso
CM	16	(Ukraine) Serhiy Sydorchuk	(substituted off) 101'
RF	10	(Ukraine) Andriy Yarmolenko	(yellow card) 62'
CF	22	(Ukraine) Artem Kravets	(yellow card) 56' (substituted off) 76'
LF	7	(Netherlands) Jeremain Lens
Substitutes:
GK	23	(Ukraine) Oleksandr Rybka
DF	5	(Portugal) Vitorino Antunes	(substituted in) 46'
MF	19	(Ukraine) Denys Harmash
MF	20	(Ukraine) Oleh Husiev	(substituted in) 76'
MF	29	(Ukraine) Vitaliy Buyalskyi
DF	30	(Brazil) Betão
AM	90	(Morocco) Younès Belhanda	(substituted in) 101'
Manager:
(Ukraine) Serhii Rebrov

Shakhtar Donetsk:
GK	30	(Ukraine) Andriy Pyatov
RB	33	(Croatia) Darijo Srna (c)	(yellow card) 55'
CB	5	(Ukraine) Oleksandr Kucher	(substituted off) 45+2'
CB	44	(Ukraine) Yaroslav Rakitskiy
LB	13	(Ukraine) Vyacheslav Shevchuk
DM	6	(Ukraine) Taras Stepanenko
DM	77	(Brazil) Ilsinho	(yellow card) 44' (substituted off) 91'
RW	20	(Brazil) Douglas Costa
AM	29	(Brazil) Alex Teixeira
LW	10	(Brazil) Bernard	(substituted off) 68'
CF	9	(Brazil) Luiz Adriano
Substitutes:
GK	32	(Ukraine) Anton Kanibolotskiy
MF	11	(Brazil) Marlos
DF	31	(Brazil) Ismaily
DF	38	(Ukraine) Serhiy Kryvtsov	(substituted in) 45+2'
MF	17	(Brazil) Fernando
MF	28	(Brazil) Taison	(substituted in) 68' (yellow card) 120'
FW	21	(Ukraine) Oleksandr Hladkyy	(substituted in) 91'
Manager:
(Romania) Mircea Lucescu

MAN OF THE MATCH

MATCH OFFICIALS

- Assistant referees:
  - Serhiy Bekker (Kharkiv)
  - Oleksandr Vostyuk (Zaporizhya)
- Fourth official:
  - Yuriy Moiseychuk

MATCH RULES

- 90 minutes.
- 30 minutes of extra-time if necessary.
- Penalty shoot-out if scores still level.
- Seven named substitutes.
- Maximum of 3 substitutions.

== See also ==
- 2014–15 Ukrainian Premier League
