= 2011 Ukrainian Cup final =

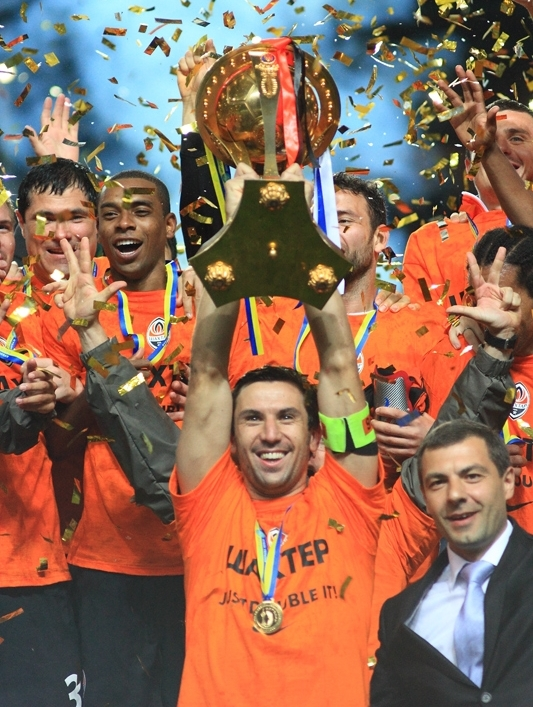
- Event: 2010–11 Ukrainian Cup
Dynamo Kyiv	Shakhtar Donetsk
0	2
- Date: 25 May 2011
- Venue: Yuvileiny Stadium, Sumy
- Man of the Match: Fernandinho (Shakhtar Donetsk)
- Referee: Victor Svetsov
- Attendance: 27,800
- Weather: 19°C (66°F)

The 2011 Ukrainian Cup final was a football match that was played at the Yuvileiny Stadium, Sumy, on 25 May 2011. The match was the 20th Ukrainian Cup Final and was contested by Dynamo Kyiv and Shakhtar Donetsk. This was the first time a Ukrainian Cup final was played in Sumy.

Since this match was between two teams that had qualified for the 2011–12 UEFA Champions League, the sixth-placed team in the 2010–11 Ukrainian Premier League season would qualify for the 2011–12 UEFA Europa League. In the draw, Dynamo was selected as the home team. After a goalless first half, Shakhtar's superiority prevailed and they won the match 2–0, enabling them to win the Ukrainian treble of the Ukrainian Super Cup, the Premier League and the Ukrainian Cup.

== Road to Sumy ==
As Ukrainian Premier League members Shakhtar Donetsk and Dynamo Kyiv did not have to go through the qualification round to get into the competition.

Dynamo Kyiv
Round 1	Krymteplitsia Molodizhne	0–1	Dynamo Kyiv
Round 2	PFC Sevastopol	1–2	Dynamo Kyiv
Quarter-final	Stal Alchevsk	2–3	Dynamo Kyiv
Semi-final	Dynamo Kyiv	2–0	Arsenal Kyiv

Shakhtar Donetsk
Round 1	Shakhtar Donetsk	6–0	Kryvbas Kryvyi Rih
Round 2	Poltava	0–2	Shakhtar Donetsk
Quarter-final	Shakhtar Donetsk	1–0	Metalurh Zaporizhya
Semi-final	Shakhtar Donetsk	2–1	Dnipro Dnipropetrovsk

== Previous encounters ==
This was the sixth Ukrainian Cup final between the two teams. Dynamo had defeated Shakhtar three times out of the five Cup Finals. In the last final, however, in 2008, Shakhtar was victorious. The two teams also met in a semi final in 2008–09 and in the quarter-final in 2009–10 in which Shakhtar was victorious in both games.

Dynamo had appeared in 11 finals, winning 9, while opponents Shakhtar had appeared in 10 finals, winning 6.

== Television ==
The match was broadcast on ICTV in Ukraine.

== Match ==
=== Details ===
25 May 2011
20:15 EEST

Dynamo Kyiv	0 – 2	Shakhtar Donetsk
	Report	Eduardo 64'; Luiz Adriano 87'

Yuvileiny Stadium, Sumy
Attendance: 27,800
Referee: Victor Shvetsov (Odesa)

Dynamo Kyiv
Shakhtar Donetsk

Dynamo:
GK	1	(Ukraine) Oleksandr Shovkovskyi (c)
DF	2	(Brazil) Danilo Silva	(substituted off) 58'
DF	5	(Croatia) Ognjen Vukojević
DF	6	(North Macedonia) Goran Popov	(yellow card) 82'
FW	7	(Ukraine) Andriy Shevchenko
FW	9	(Ukraine) Andriy Yarmolenko
MF	10	(Ukraine) Artem Milevskyi	(yellow card) 89'
MF	20	(Ukraine) Oleh Husyev
MF	23	(Finland) Roman Eremenko	(substituted off) 70'
MF	34	(Ukraine) Yevhen Khacheridi
DF	37	(Nigeria) Ayila Yussuf	(yellow card) 90+1'
Substitutes:
GK	71	(Ukraine) Denys Boyko
DF	3	(Brazil) Betão	(substituted in) 58' (yellow card) 73' (yellow-red card) 86'
MF	8	(Ukraine) Oleksandr Aliyev	(substituted in) 70'
MF	19	(Ukraine) Denys Harmash
FW	22	(Ukraine) Artem Kravets
DF	30	(Morocco) Badr El Kaddouri
FW	49	(Ukraine) Roman Zozulya
Manager:
(Russia) Yuriy Semin

Shakhtar Donetsk:
GK	30	(Ukraine) Andriy Pyatov
DF	3	(Czech Republic) Tomáš Hübschman
DF	5	(Ukraine) Oleksandr Kucher
MF	7	(Brazil) Fernandinho	(yellow card) 90+1'
MF	8	(Brazil) Jádson	(substituted off) 81'
MF	9	(Brazil) Luiz Adriano	87' (substituted off) 90+5'
FW	11	(Croatia) Eduardo	64' (yellow card) 70' (yellow-red card) 77'
MF	13	(Ukraine) Vyacheslav Shevchuk
FW	19	(Brazil) Willian	(substituted off) 77'
DF	33	(Croatia) Darijo Srna (c)	(yellow card) 89'
DF	44	(Ukraine) Yaroslav Rakitskiy
Substitutes:
GK	12	(Ukraine) Rustam Khudzhamov
MF	19	(Ukraine) Oleksiy Gai
MF	26	(Romania) Răzvan Raț
FW	20	(Brazil) Douglas Costa	(substituted in) 90+5'
MF	22	(Armenia) Henrikh Mkhitaryan	(substituted in) 81'
MF	29	(Brazil) Alex Teixeira	(substituted in) 77'
DF	32	(Ukraine) Mykola Ischenko
Manager:
(Romania) Mircea Lucescu

MAN OF THE MATCH

- Fernandinho (Shakhtar Donetsk)

MATCH OFFICIALS

- Assistant referees:
  - Vitaliy Demyanenko (Mukachevo)
  - Mykola Vasyuta (Rivne)
- Fourth official: Ihor Pokyd'ko (Poltava)

MATCH RULES

- 90 minutes.
- 30 minutes of extra-time if necessary.
- Penalty shoot-out if scores still level.
- Seven named substitutes
- Maximum of 3 substitutions.

== Post-match ==
On account of Shakhtar's victory and Dynamo's defeat in the final, and with both team finishing as the top two teams in the 2010–11 Ukrainian Premier League, the 2011 Ukrainian Super Cup would feature both teams.

== See also ==
- 2010–11 Ukrainian Premier League
