= 2014–15 FC Shakhtar Donetsk season =

Shakhtar Donetsk
2014–15 season
- Chairman: Rinat Akhmetov
- Manager: Mircea Lucescu
- Stadium: Donbas Arena
- Premier League: 2nd
- Ukrainian Cup: Runners-up
- Super Cup: Winners
- UEFA Champions League: Round of 16
- Top goalscorer: League: Alex Teixeira (17); All: Alex Teixeira (22)
- Highest home attendance: 34,347 vs Dynamo Kyiv
- Lowest home attendance: 800 vs Poltava
- Average home league attendance: 12,939
Home colours	Away colours	Third colours

The 2014–15 Shakhtar Donetsk season was the 24th season in the club's history, they were the defending Ukrainian Premier League champions that season.

== Season events ==
On 4 July, Shakhtar announced the signing of Marlos from Metalist Kharkiv to a five-year contract.

== Squad ==
As of match played 4 June 2015

Number	Name	Nationality	Position	Date of birth (age)	Signed from	Signed in	Contract ends	Apps.	Goals
Goalkeepers
23	Bohdan Sarnavskyi	(Ukraine)	GK	29 January 1995 (aged 20)	Arsenal Kyiv	2014		3	0
30	Andriy Pyatov	(Ukraine)	GK	28 June 1984 (aged 30)	Vorskla Poltava	2007		269	0
32	Anton Kanibolotskyi	(Ukraine)	GK	16 May 1988 (aged 27)	Dnipro Dnipropetrovsk	2012	2017	37	0
Defenders
4	Oleksandr Volovyk	(Ukraine)	DF	30 October 1992 (aged 22)	Metalurh Donetsk	2013		6	0
5	Oleksandr Kucher	(Ukraine)	DF	22 October 1982 (aged 32)	Metalist Kharkiv	2006		236	8
13	Vyacheslav Shevchuk	(Ukraine)	DF	13 May 1979 (aged 36)	Dnipro Dnipropetrovsk	2005		227	4
18	Ivan Ordets	(Ukraine)	DF	8 July 1992 (aged 22)	Academy	2009		14	0
31	Ismaily	(Brazil)	DF	11 January 1990 (aged 25)	Braga	2013	2017	24	2
33	Darijo Srna (Captain)	(Croatia)	DF	1 May 1982 (aged 33)	Hajduk Split	2003		449	43
38	Serhiy Kryvtsov	(Ukraine)	DF	15 March 1991 (aged 24)	Metalurh Zaporizhzhia	2010	2015	69	6
44	Yaroslav Rakitskyi	(Ukraine)	DF	3 August 1989 (aged 25)	Academy	2009		206	9
66	Márcio Azevedo	(Brazil)	DF	5 February 1986 (aged 29)	Metalist Kharkiv	2014	2018	6	0
Midfielders
6	Taras Stepanenko	(Ukraine)	MF	8 August 1989 (aged 25)	Metalurh Zaporizhzhia	2010	2015	118	8
7	Wellington Nem	(Brazil)	MF	6 February 1992 (aged 23)	Fluminense	2013	2018	20	5
8	Fred	(Brazil)	MF	5 March 1993 (aged 22)	Internacional	2013	2018	67	5
10	Bernard	(Brazil)	MF	8 September 1992 (aged 22)	Atlético Mineiro	2013	2018	52	5
11	Marlos	(Brazil)	MF	7 June 1988 (aged 26)	Metalist Kharkiv	2014	2019	35	6
17	Fernando	(Brazil)	MF	3 March 1992 (aged 23)	Grêmio	2013	2018	48	3
20	Douglas Costa	(Brazil)	MF	14 September 1990 (aged 24)	Grêmio	2010	2015	202	38
28	Taison	(Brazil)	MF	17 January 1988 (aged 27)	Metalist Kharkiv	2013	2017	79	11
29	Alex Teixeira	(Brazil)	MF	6 January 1990 (aged 25)	Vasco da Gama	2010	2015	193	59
74	Viktor Kovalenko	(Ukraine)	MF	14 February 1996 (aged 19)	Academy	2008		4	0
77	Ilsinho	(Brazil)	MF	12 October 1985 (aged 29)	São Paulo	2012	2015	176	22
Forwards
9	Luiz Adriano	(Brazil)	FW	12 April 1987 (aged 28)	Internacional	2007		266	126
21	Oleksandr Hladkyi	(Ukraine)	FW	24 August 1987 (aged 27)	Kharkiv	2007		149	52
89	Dentinho	(Brazil)	FW	19 January 1989 (aged 26)	Corinthians	2011	2016	43	5
Away on loan
24	Dmytro Hrechyshkin	(Ukraine)	MF	22 September 1991 (aged 23)	Academy	2008		17	1
	Mykyta Shevchenko	(Ukraine)	GK	26 January 1993 (aged 22)	Academy	2011		0	0
50	Serhiy Bolbat	(Ukraine)	MF	13 June 1993 (aged 21)	Academy	2011		2	0
	Alan Patrick	(Brazil)	MF	13 May 1991 (aged 24)	Santos	2011	2016	6	2
	David Targamadze	(Georgia (country))	MF	22 August 1989 (aged 25)	Oleksandriya	2011	2016	0	0
	Facundo Ferreyra	(Argentina)	FW	14 March 1991 (aged 24)	Vélez Sarsfield	2013	2017	21	3
Players who left during the season
27	Dmytro Chyhrynskyi (vice-captain)	(Ukraine)	DF	7 November 1986 (aged 27)	Barcelona	2010		186	16

=== Out on Loan ===
Note: Flags indicate national team as defined under FIFA eligibility rules; some limited exceptions apply. Players may hold more than one non-FIFA nationality.

No.	Pos.	Nation	Player
—	GK	UKR	Rustam Khudzhamov (on loan to Zorya Luhansk)
—	GK	UKR	Mykyta Shevchenko (on loan to Zorya Luhansk)
—	GK	UKR	Yaroslav Stavytskyi (on loan to Zorya Luhansk)
—	DF	UKR	Mykhaylo Pysko (on loan to Zorya Luhansk)
—	DF	UKR	Eduard Sobol (on loan to Metalurh Donetsk)
—	DF	UKR	Taras Kacharaba (on loan to Hoverla Uzhhorod)
—	DF	UKR	Serhiy Vakulenko (on loan to Illichivets Mariupol)
—	DF	UKR	Bohdan Butko (on loan to Amkar Perm)
—	MF	UKR	Maksym Malyshev (on loan to Zorya Luhansk)
—	MF	UKR	Andriy Totovytskyi (on loan to Zorya Luhansk)
—	MF	UKR	Ruslan Malinovskyi (on loan to Zorya Luhansk)
—	MF	UKR	Oleksandr Karavayev (on loan to Zorya Luhansk)
—	MF	UKR	Serhiy Hryn (on loan to Illichivets Mariupol)
—	MF	UKR	Maksym Zhychykov (on loan to Illichivets Mariupol)
—	MF	UKR	Vyacheslav Churko (on loan to Illichivets Mariupol)

No.	Pos.	Nation	Player
—	MF	UKR	Oleksiy Polyanskyi (on loan to Hoverla Uzhhorod)
—	MF	UKR	Illya Hlushytskyi (on loan to Hoverla Uzhhorod)
—	MF	UKR	Vasyl Kobin (on loan to FC Shakhtyor Soligorsk)
—	MF	UKR	Denys Kozhanov (on loan to Karpaty Lviv)
—	MF	UKR	Dmytro Hrechyshkin (on loan to Chornomorets Odesa)
—	MF	BRA	Alan Patrick (on loan to Palmeiras)
—	MF	UKR	Vitaliy Vitsenets (on loan to)
—	MF	GEO	David Targamadze (on loan to)
—	FW	UKR	Pylyp Budkivskyi (on loan to Zorya Luhansk)
—	FW	UKR	Serhiy Bolbat (on loan to Metalist Kharkiv)
—	FW	UKR	Anton Shynder (on loan to Vorskla Poltava)
—	FW	UKR	Valeriy Hryshyn (on loan to Hoverla Uzhhorod)
—	FW	UKR	Vladyslav Kulach (on loan to Metalurh Zaporizhya)
—	FW	UKR	Maksym Ilyuk (on loan to Illichivets Mariupo)
—	FW	ARG	Facundo Ferreyra (on loan to Newcastle United)

== Transfers ==
=== In ===
Date	Position	Nationality	Name	From	Fee	Ref.
1 July 2014	GK	(Ukraine)	Rustam Khudzhamov	Illichivets Mariupol	Undisclosed	
1 July 2014	FW	(Ukraine)	Oleksandr Hladkyi	Dnipro Dnipropetrovsk	Undisclosed	
4 July 2014	MF	(Brazil)	Marlos	Metalist Kharkiv	Undisclosed	
17 August 2014	DF	(Brazil)	Márcio Azevedo	Metalist Kharkiv	Undisclosed	

=== Out ===
Date	Position	Nationality	Name	To	Fee	Ref.
1 July 2014	MF	(Ukraine)	Vladlen Yurchenko	Bayer Leverkusen	Undisclosed	
9 July 2014	MF	(Czech Republic)	Tomáš Hübschman	Baumit Jablonec	Undisclosed	
17 July 2014	FW	(Croatia)	Eduardo	Flamengo	Undisclosed	
28 July 2014	MF	(Georgia (country))	Tornike Okriashvili	Genk	Undisclosed	
1 January 2015	MF	(Russia)	Roman Yemelyanov	Ural Yekaterinburg	Undisclosed	
9 February 2015	DF	(Ukraine)	Dmytro Chyhrynskyi	Dnipro Dnipropetrovsk	Undisclosed	
23 February 2015	GK	(Ukraine)	Mykyta Kryukov	Illichivets Mariupol	Undisclosed	
27 February 2015	DF	(Ukraine)	Mykola Ishchenko	Metalist Kharkiv	Undisclosed	

=== Loans out ===
Date From	Position	Nationality	Name	To	Date To	Ref.
1 July 2011	DF	(Ukraine)	Bohdan Butko	Illichivets Mariupol	31 December 2014	
20 March 2014	MF	(Brazil)	Alan Patrick	Internacional	31 December 2014	
1 July 2014	FW	(Ukraine)	Anton Shynder	Chornomorets Odesa	31 December 2014	
25 July 2014	MF	(Ukraine)	Dmytro Hrechyshkin	Chornomorets Odesa	30 June 2015	
25 July 2014	MF	(Ukraine)	Denys Kozhanov	Karpaty Lviv	30 June 2016	
3 August 2014	FW	(Argentina)	Facundo Ferreyra	Newcastle United	30 June 2015	
12 August 2014	DF	(Ukraine)	Bohdan Butko	Illichivets Mariupol	31 December 2014	
12 August 2014	DF	(Ukraine)	Vasyl Kobin	Metalist Kharkiv	31 March 2015	
1 September 2014	MF	(Russia)	Roman Yemelyanov	Ural Yekaterinburg	31 December 2014	
1 January 2015	FW	(Ukraine)	Anton Shynder	Vorskla Poltava	30 June 2016	
19 January 2015	MF	(Brazil)	Alan Patrick	Palmeiras	10 June 2015	
23 February 2015	DF	(Ukraine)	Bohdan Butko	Amkar Perm	30 June 2016	
2 March 2015	GK	(Ukraine)	Rustam Khudzhamov	Zorya Luhansk	30 June 2015	
1 April 2015	DF	(Ukraine)	Vasyl Kobin	Illichivets Mariupol	30 June 2015	

=== Released ===
Date	Position	Nationality	Name	Joined	Date	Ref.
30 June 2015	MF	(Brazil)	Ilsinho	Philadelphia Union	24 February 2016	

== Friendlies ==
17 January 2015	Bahia (Brazil)	3 – 2	(Ukraine) Shakhtar Donetsk	Salvador, Brazil
01:00 EET (UTC+2)	Rômulo 13'; Bruno Paulista (yellow card) 34'; Zé Roberto 55', 63'; Tchô (yellow card) 67'	Report	Teixeira 27'; Luiz Adriano 37'	Stadium: Itaipava Arena Fonte Nova; Attendance: 17,213; Referee: Jailson Macedo Freitas

18 January 2015 Granada Cup	Flamengo (Brazil)	0 – 0	(Ukraine) Shakhtar Donetsk	Brasília, Brazil
21:00 EET (UTC+2)	Marcelo (yellow card) 85'	Report	Fernando (yellow card) 83'	Stadium: Estádio Nacional Mané Garrincha; Attendance: 26,911; Referee: Rodrigo Raposo

22 January 2015	Atlético Mineiro (Brazil)	4 – 2	(Ukraine) Shakhtar Donetsk	Belo Horizonte, Brazil
00:30 EET (UTC+2)	Pratto 16'; Carlos 41'; Silva 44'; Dodô 55'; Jemerson (red card) 90'	Report	Douglas Costa (yellow card) 43'; Rakytskiy (yellow card) 50'; Shevchuk (yellow card) 68'; Hladkyy 82'; Fernando 87'	Stadium: Independência; Attendance: 26,543; Referee: Igor Junio Benevenuto

24 January 2015	Internacional (Brazil)	1 – 2	(Ukraine) Shakhtar Donetsk	Porto Alegre, Brazil
00:01 EET (UTC+2)	Ernando (yellow card) 45'; Aránguiz 52'; Willians (yellow card) 50' (yellow-red card) 53'; Paulão (red card) 77'	Report	Luiz Adriano 4'; Kucher (yellow card) 25'; Taison 26'; Srna (yellow card) 31'; Douglas Costa (yellow card) 38'; Fernando (yellow card) 47'; Kryvtsov (yellow card) 57'; Teixeira (red card) 77'	Stadium: Estádio Beira-Rio; Attendance: 34,589; Referee: Leandro Vuaden

25 January 2015 Granada Cup	Cruzeiro (Brazil)	1 – 1	(Ukraine) Shakhtar Donetsk	Brasília, Brazil
21:00 EET (UTC+2)	Judivan 66'	Report	Teixeira 14'	Stadium: Estádio Nacional Mané Garrincha; Attendance: 6,872; Referee: Ricardo de Lima Legnani

2 February 2015	Dinamo Zagreb (Croatia)	1 – 1	(Ukraine) Shakhtar Donetsk	La Manga, Spain
18:00 EET (UTC+2)	Henríquez 9'; Fernándes (yellow card) 37'; Vukojević (yellow card) 58'; Ademi (yellow card) 88'	Report	Luiz Adriano 24'; Douglas Costa (yellow card) 44'	Stadium: Pinatar Arena; Referee: Ken Henry Johnsen (Norway)

4 February 2015	Almería (Spain)	1 – 3	(Ukraine) Shakhtar Donetsk	La Manga, Spain
17:30 EET (UTC+2)	Thomas 30'	Report	Vélez 13' (o.g.); Taison 41'; Teixeira 70'	Stadium: Pinatar Arena

5 February 2015	Real Murcia (Spain)	1 – 2	(Ukraine) Shakhtar Donetsk	La Manga, Spain
12:00 EET (UTC+2)	Oliva 75' (pen.)	Report	Dentinho 32'; Marlos 45'; Fernando (yellow card) 72'	Stadium: Pinatar Arena

7 February 2015	AaB (Denmark)	1 – 2	(Ukraine) Shakhtar Donetsk	La Manga, Spain
20:00 EET (UTC+2)	Helenius 34'	Report	Rakytskiy (yellow card) 35'; Taison 47'; Luiz Adriano 54'	Stadium: Pinatar Arena

19 February 2015	Shakhtar Donetsk (Ukraine)	1 – 0	(Kazakhstan) Atyrau	Aksu, Turkey
17:30 EET (UTC+2)	Ismaily 26'	Report	Arzhanov (yellow card) 78'	Stadium: Mardan Sports Complex; Referee: Oleksandr Holovkov

20 February 2015	Shakhtar Donetsk (Ukraine)	3 – 1	(Poland) GKS Tychy	Aksu, Turkey
17:15 EET (UTC+2)	Luiz Adriano 63'; Douglas Costa 66'; Srna 78'	Report	Mączyński (yellow card) 38'; Warna 59'	Stadium: Mardan Sports Complex

22 February 2015	Shakhtar Donetsk (Ukraine)	2 – 0	(Belarus) Dinamo Minsk	Aksu, Turkey
17:15 EET (UTC+2)	Hladkyy (yellow card) 26'; Luiz Adriano 72'; Douglas Costa 74'	Report	Veratsila (yellow card) 71'; Kantsavy (yellow card) 76'	Stadium: Mardan Sports Complex

24 February 2015	Shakhtar Donetsk (Ukraine)	2 – 1	Azerbaijan	Aksu, Turkey
16:00 EET (UTC+2)	Douglas Costa 37'; Ismaily 67'	Report	Aleskerov 43'	Stadium: Mardan Sports Complex

27 March 2015	Shakhtar Donetsk (Ukraine)	1 – 1	(Cyprus) AEL	Limassol, Cyprus
19:00 EET (UTC+2)	Hladkyy 24'; Teixeira (yellow card) 42'	Report	Kryvtsov 17' (o.g.)	Stadium: Tsirion Stadium

29 March 2015	Shakhtar Donetsk (Ukraine)	4 – 3	(Cyprus) Aris	Limassol, Cyprus
15:00 EET (UTC+2)	Wellington Nem 37', 65', 86'; Ilsinho 90' (pen.)	Report	Pulpo 51' (pen.); Kyprou 62', 69'	Stadium: Tsirion Stadium

== Competitions ==
=== Overall ===
Competition	First match	Last match	Starting round	Final position	Record							
Competition	First match	Last match	Starting round	Final position	Pld	W	D	L	GF	GA	GD	Win %
Premier League	27 July 2014	29 May 2015	Matchday 1	Runners-up	26	17	5	4	71	21	+50	65.38
Ukrainian Cup	23 August 2014	4 June 2015	Round of 32	Runners-up	8	6	1	1	15	3	+12	75.00
Super Cup	22 July 2014		Final	Winners	1	1	0	0	2	0	+2	100.00
UEFA Champions League	17 September 2014	11 March 2015	Group Stage	Round of 16	8	2	4	2	15	11	+4	25.00
Total					43	26	10	7	103	35	+68	60.47

Last updated: 4 June 2015
Source: Results

=== Super Cup ===
22 July 2014	Shakhtar Donetsk	2 – 0	Dynamo Kyiv	Lviv
21:00 EEST (UTC+3)	Ilsinho (yellow card) 23'; Hladkyy 75'; Luiz Adriano (yellow card) 82'; Stepanenko (yellow card) 86'; Marlos 90+3'	Report	Belhanda (yellow card) 23'; Silva (yellow card) 30'; Yarmolenko (yellow card) 51'; Bezus (yellow card) 61'; Mbokani (yellow card) 80'	Stadium: Arena Lviv; Attendance: 34,347; Referee: Yuriy Morzharovskyi

=== Premier League ===
==== Results summary ====
Overall								Home						Away					
Pld	W	D	L	GF	GA	GD	Pts	W	D	L	GF	GA	GD	W	D	L	GF	GA	GD
26	17	5	4	71	21	+50	56	9	3	1	34	6	+28	8	2	3	37	15	+22

==== Results by round ====
Round	1	2	3	4	5	6	7	8	9	10	11	12	13	14	15	16	17	18	19	20	21	22	23	24	25	26
Ground	H	A	H	A	H	A	H	A	H	A	H	A	A	H	H	A	H	A	H	A	H	A	A	H	A	H
Result	W	W	W	W	W	W	L	L	W	L	D	W	W	W	W	D	W	W	W	W	D	D	W	W	L	D
Position	2	1	2	1	1	1	2	3	3	3	3	3	2	2	2	2	2	2	2	2	2	3	2	2	2	2

Updated to match(es) played on 26 May 2015. Source: Socceraway
A = Away; H = Home; W = Win; D = Draw; L = Loss

==== Results ====
27 July 2014 1	Shakhtar Donetsk	2 – 0	Metalurh Zaporizhya	Lviv
19:00 EEST (UTC+3)	Luiz Adriano 1'; Hladkyy 44'	Report	Serginho (yellow card) 59'	Stadium: Arena Lviv; Attendance: 4,810; Referee: Sergiy Lysenchuk

1 August 2014 2	Vorskla Poltava	1 – 2	Shakhtar Donetsk	Poltava
19:00 EEST (UTC+3)	Hromov 28'; Barannik (yellow card) 31'; Markoski (yellow card) 67'; Dallku (red card) 90+2'; Tursunov (yellow card) 90+2'	Report	Fernando (yellow card) 11'; Kucher (yellow card) 48' (yellow-red card) 90+2'; Hladkyy 80'; Stepanenko 82'; Srna (yellow card) 90+2'; Douglas Costa (yellow card) 90+2'; Kanibolotskyi (yellow card) 90+4'	Stadium: Oleksiy Butovskyi Vorskla Stadium; Attendance: 8,300; Referee: Kostyantin Trukhanov

9 August 2014 3	Shakhtar Donetsk	1 – 0	Metalist Kharkiv	Lviv
19:30 EEST (UTC+3)	Ordets (red card) 15'; Rakytskiy 52'; Ilsinho (yellow card) 64'; Stepanenko (yellow card) 67'	Report	Edmar (yellow card) 62'	Stadium: Arena Lviv; Attendance: 18,556; Referee: Yuri Mozharovskiy

15 August 2014 4	Olimpik Donetsk	0 – 5	Shakhtar Donetsk	Kyiv
17:00 EEST (UTC+3)	Ohirya (yellow card) 39'; Tyschenko (yellow card) 45+1'; Dytyatev (yellow card) 48'	Report	Kryvtsov 17'; Taison 24'; Hladkyy 47', (yellow card) 66'; Wellington Nem 78'; Stepanenko 90+1'	Stadium: Bannikov Stadium; Attendance: 1,200; Referee: Victor Shvetsov

29 August 2014 5	Shakhtar Donetsk	3 – 0	Illichivets Mariupol	Lviv
17:00 EEST (UTC+3)	Fernando (yellow card) 18'; Hladkyy 32'; Teixeira 55'; Taison 75'; Rakytskiy (red card) 83'	Report	Harashchenkov (yellow card) 23'; Chyzhov (yellow card) 45'; Dovhyi (yellow card) 45+4'	Stadium: Arena Lviv; Attendance: 970; Referee: Ivan Bondar

13 September 2014 6	Chornomorets Odesa	0 – 2	Shakhtar Donetsk	Odesa
19:30 EEST (UTC+3)	Zubeyko (yellow card) 65'; Gai (yellow card) 82'	Report	Fernando 27'; Hladkyy 90'	Stadium: Chornomorets Stadium; Attendance: 25,182; Referee: Sergiy Berezka

21 September 2014 7	Shakhtar Donetsk	0 – 1	Zorya Luhansk	Lviv
17:00 EEST (UTC+3)	Srna (yellow card) 36'; Ordets (yellow card) 89'	Report	Malyshev (yellow card) 34', (goal) 42'; Budkivskyi (yellow card) 67'; Segbefia (yellow card) 90'	Stadium: Arena Lviv; Attendance: 1,100; Referee: Yuriy Moseychuk

5 October 2014 8	Dynamo Kyiv	1 – 0	Shakhtar Donetsk	Kyiv
19:30 EEST (UTC+3)	Kravets (yellow card) 34'; Vida 71'; Sydorchuk (yellow card) 82'; Dragović (yellow card) 90'; Yarmolenko (yellow card) 90+2'	Report	Ilsinho (yellow card) 6'; Luiz Adriano 16'; Shevchuk (yellow card) 41' (yellow-red card) 62'; Teixeira (yellow card) 58'; Srna (yellow card) 64'; Stepanenko (yellow card) 85'	Stadium: NSC Olimpiyskiy; Attendance: 57,502; Referee: Yuri Mozharovskiy

17 October 2014 9	Shakhtar Donetsk	6 – 2	Volyn Lutsk	Lviv
19:00 EEST (UTC+3)	Dentinho 4'; Luiz Adriano 36', 90+1'; Srna 47'; Teixeira 85'; Kucher (yellow card) 87'; Douglas Costa 88'	Report	Bicfalvi 22', (yellow card) 69'; Siminin (yellow card) 34'; Celin (yellow card) 42', (goal) 57'; Shabanov (yellow card) 76'	Stadium: Arena Lviv; Attendance: 7,647; Referee: Sergiy Dankovskyi

31 October 2014 11	Metalurh Donetsk	2 – 1	Shakhtar Donetsk	Kyiv
19:00 EET (UTC+2)	Baranovskyi (yellow card) 49'; Pryima (yellow card) 61'; Morozyuk 73'; Lazić 75'	Summary	Rakytskiy (yellow card) 58'; Srna 82'	Stadium: Obolon Arena; Attendance: 2,500; Referee: Yury Vaks

9 November 2014 12	Shakhtar Donetsk	0 – 0	Dnipro Dnipropetrovsk	Lviv
17:00 EET (UTC+2)	Ordets (yellow card) 42'; Fred (yellow card) 66'	Report	Zozulya (yellow card) 45'; Konoplyanka (yellow card) 53'; Mazuch (yellow card) 55'; Fedetskyi (yellow card) 74'; Bartulović (red card) 87'	Stadium: Arena Lviv; Attendance: 22,417; Referee: Anatoliy Abdula

21 November 2014 13	Karpaty Lviv	0 – 2	Shakhtar Donetsk	Lviv
19:00 EET (UTC+2)	Serhiychuk (yellow card) 45+1'; Kozhanov (yellow card) 55'; Balažic (yellow card) 58'	Report	Teixeira 10'; Luiz Adriano 22'; Bernard (yellow card) 45+2'; Ilsinho (yellow card) 78'	Stadium: Ukraina Stadium; Attendance: 8,900; Referee: Victor Shvetsov

30 November 2014 14	Metalurh Zaporizhya	0 – 4	Shakhtar Donetsk	Zaporizhia
14:00 EET (UTC+2)	Korotetskiy (yellow card) 32'; Rudyka (yellow card) 80'	Report	Marlos 56'; Teixeira 60', 61'; Stepanenko (yellow card) 82'; Wellington Nem 90'	Stadium: Slavutych-Arena; Attendance: 2000; Referee: Sergiy Berezka

5 December 2014 10	Shakhtar Donetsk	4 – 1	Hoverla Uzhhorod	Lviv
19:00 EET (UTC+2)	Hladkyy 20', 80'; Khomyn 32' (o.g.); Fred 90+4'	Report	Rodić (yellow card) 44'; Myakushko 49'; Raičević (yellow card) 77'	Stadium: Arena Lviv; Attendance: 3417; Referee: Yuri Mozharovskiy

28 February 2015 15	Shakhtar Donetsk	3 – 0	Vorskla Poltava	Lviv
17:00 EET (UTC+2)	Teixeira (yellow card) 14', (goal) 68'; Shevchuk 25'; Douglas Costa 49', (yellow card) 72'; Ordets (red card) 60'	Report	Budnik (yellow card) 2'; Siminin (yellow card) 81'; Sapay (yellow card) 85'	Stadium: Arena Lviv; Attendance: 8214; Referee: Evgen Aranovskiy

7 March 2015 16	Metalist Kharkiv	2 – 2	Shakhtar Donetsk	Lviv
17:00 EET (UTC+2)	Dovhyi 18', (yellow card) 86'; Bobko (yellow card) 37'; Ryzhuk (red card) 45+3'; Pohorilyi (yellow card) 68'; Ischenko (yellow card) 82'; Priyomov 90+2'	Report	Srna 45+3' (pen.); Ilsinho (yellow card) 65'; Luiz Adriano 73'; Marlos (yellow card) 89'	Stadium: Arena Lviv; Attendance: 2,650; Referee: Anatoliy Zhabchenko

15 March 2015 17	Shakhtar Donetsk	6 – 0	Olimpik Donetsk	Lviv
17:00 EET (UTC+2)	Srna 8', (yellow card) 65'; Teixeira (yellow card) 13', (goal) 87'; Taison (yellow card) 35', (goal) 57'; Marlos 38', 39', (yellow card) 45'; Hladkyy 43'	Report	Dytyatev (yellow card) 5'; Lebed (yellow card) 7'; Lysenko (yellow card) 7'	Stadium: Arena Lviv; Attendance: 4400; Referee: Victor Shvetsov

5 April 2015 18	Illichivets Mariupol	2 – 6	Shakhtar Donetsk	Kyiv
17:00 EEST (UTC+3)	Matyazh (yellow card) 25'; Prykhodko (yellow card) 29'; Shevchuk 41'; Hryn 56'	Report	Hladkyy 9'; Zubkov 27' (o.g.); Marlos 43'; Teixeira 45+2', 62', (yellow card) 90'; Wellington Nem 86'	Stadium: Obolon Arena; Attendance: 2,700; Referee: Sergiy Skrypak

11 April 2015 19	Shakhtar Donetsk	5 – 0	Chornomorets Odesa	Lviv
17:00 EEST (UTC+3)	Srna (yellow card) 14'; Rakytskiy (yellow card) 41'; Douglas Costa (yellow card) 45+2', (goal) 61'; Ilsinho (yellow card) 49'; Luiz Adriano 71', 80'; Stepanenko 76'; Taison 90+4'	Report	Krneta (yellow card) 27'; Oliynyk (red card) 30'; Danchenko (yellow card) 36'; Kabayev (yellow card) 56'	Stadium: Arena Lviv; Attendance: 2,471; Referee: Ivan Bondar

18 April 2015 20	Zorya Luhansk	1 – 4	Shakhtar Donetsk	Zaporizhia
19:30 EEST (UTC+3)	Ljubenović 2' (pen.)	Report	Kryvtsov 45'; Teixeira 68', 86'; Luiz Adriano 71' (pen.)	Stadium: Slavutych-Arena; Attendance: 2500; Referee: Yury Vaks

26 April 2015 21	Shakhtar Donetsk	0 – 0	Dynamo Kyiv	Lviv
19:30 EEST (UTC+3)	Taison (yellow card) 42'; Luiz Adriano (yellow card) 70'; Rakytskiy (yellow card) 79'	Report	Khacheridi (yellow card) 54'; Vida (yellow card) 90+4'	Stadium: Arena Lviv; Attendance: 32,509; Referee: Anatoliy Zhabchenko

4 May 2015 22	Volyn Lutsk	0 – 0	Shakhtar Donetsk	Lutsk
19:00 EEST (UTC+3)	Kobakhidze (yellow card) 56'; Sharpar (yellow card) 61'; Shust (yellow card) 77'; Matei (yellow card) 84'; Babatunde (yellow card) 89'; Humenyuk (yellow card) 89'	Report	Stepanenko (yellow card) 17'; Kryvtsov (yellow card) 52'; Fred (yellow card) 89'; Dentinho (yellow card) 90+2'	Stadium: Avanhard Stadium; Referee: Kostyantin Trukhanov

9 May 2015 23	Hoverla Uzhhorod	3 – 7	Shakhtar Donetsk	Uzhhorod
14:00 EEST (UTC+3)	Khlyobas 41', 47'; Myakushko (yellow card) 53'; Kacharaba (yellow card) 60'; Tudose (yellow card) 67'	Report	Hladkyy 1', 18'; Douglas Costa 13'; Rakytskiy 63', (yellow card) 82'; Luiz Adriano (yellow card) 69', (goal) 75'; Stepanenko 78'; Teixeira 90' (pen.)	Stadium: Avanhard Stadium; Attendance: 5,500; Referee: Yuriy Moseychuk

15 May 2015 24	Shakhtar Donetsk	2 – 0	Metalurh Donetsk	Lviv
17:00 EEST (UTC+3)	Teixeira 9', 45+2'; Fred (yellow card) 53'	Report	Morozyuk (yellow card) 15'; Checher (yellow card) 54' (red card) 54'; Makrides (yellow card) 75'	Stadium: Arena Lviv; Attendance: 5,117; Referee: Yaroslav Kozyk

23 May 2015 25	Dnipro Dnipropetrovsk	3 – 2	Shakhtar Donetsk	Dnipropetrovsk
18:00 EEST (UTC+3)	Matheus 23'; Shakhov (yellow card) 41'; Bezus 64' (yellow card) 69'; Luchkevych 81'	Report	Teixeira 8', 27', (yellow card) 38'; Ilsinho (yellow card) 36'; Stepanenko (yellow card) 45+3'; Fred (yellow card) 48'; Rakytskiy (yellow card) 70' (yellow-red card) 90+4'; Wellington Nem (yellow card) 80'	Stadium: Dnipro-Arena; Attendance: 17,444; Referee: Yury Vaks

29 May 2015 26	Shakhtar Donetsk	2 – 2	Karpaty Lviv	Kyiv
EEST (UTC+3)	Kryvtsov 33', (yellow card) 75'; Teixeira 37'; Kucher (yellow card) 77'; Marlos (yellow card) 81'	Report	Karnoza 46'; Khudobyak 62'; Holodyuk (yellow card) 77'; Kostevych (yellow card) 79'; Hutsulyak (yellow card) 87'	Stadium: Obolon Arena; Attendance: 3,200; Referee: Yuriy Moseychuk

==== League table ====
Pos	Team	Pld	W	D	L	GF	GA	GD	Pts	Qualification or relegation
1	Dynamo Kyiv (C)	26	20	6	0	65	12	+53	66	Qualification for the Champions League group stage
2	Shakhtar Donetsk	26	17	5	4	71	21	+50	56	Qualification for the Champions League third qualifying round
3	Dnipro Dnipropetrovsk	26	16	6	4	47	17	+30	54	Qualification for the Europa League group stage (Note: Since winners of 2014–15 Ukrainian Cup, Dynamo Kyiv, qualified for the 2015–16 UEFA Champions League, the place in the Europa League group stage for the cup winner will be given to the third-placed team and the spots to Europa League third qualifying round will be given to the fourth-placed and fifth-placed teams.)
4	Zorya Luhansk (Note: Zorya Luhansk were initially deducted a total of 3 points on decision of the FFU Control Disciplinary Committee on 18 February 2015, but the decision was reversed and the FFU reinstated the three points to Zorya Luhansk. (17 June 2015))	26	13	6	7	40	31	+9	45	Qualification for the Europa League third qualifying round
5	Vorskla Poltava	26	11	9	6	35	22	+13	42	Qualification for the Europa League third qualifying round

Source: uafootball.net.ua
Rules for classification: 1) points; 2) goal difference; 3) goals scored; 4) head-to-head points; 5) head-to-head goal difference; 6) head-to-head goals scored; 7) fair play rating
(C) Champions

=== Ukrainian Cup ===
23 August 2014 Round of 32	Obolon-Brovar Kyiv	0 – 1	Shakhtar Donetsk	Kyiv
EEST (UTC+3)	M. Kuchynsky (yellow card) 66'; V. Prodan (yellow card) 83'; Favorov (red card) 90+2'	Summary	Luiz Adriano 90+2' (pen.)	Stadium: Obolon Arena; Attendance: 4,500; Referee: A.Lisakovsky

25 September 2014 Round of 16 1st Leg	FC Poltava	1 – 5	Shakhtar Donetsk	Poltava
16:00 EEST (UTC+3)	Fomych 37'; Y. Solomka (yellow card) 75'	Summary	Teixeira 45+1', 75'; Wellington Nem (yellow card) 48'; Hladkyy 57'; Ilsinho (yellow card) 76'; Chyhrynskyi 79'; Dentinho 90+5' (pen.)	Stadium: Lokomotov Stadium; Attendance: 2,500; Referee: Oleksandr Derdo

27 October 2014 Round of 16 2nd Leg	Shakhtar Donetsk	4 – 1 (2 – 9 agg.)	FC Poltava	Kyiv
15:00 EET (UTC+2)	Wellington Nem 9'; Hladkyy 20'; Bernard 22', 38'; Teixeira (yellow card) 90'	Report	A. Butenin (yellow card) 50'; Korkishko 51'; V. Nasibulin (yellow card) 59'	Stadium: Bannikov Stadium; Attendance: 800; Referee: Oleksandr Holovkov

4 March 2015 Quarterfinal 1st Leg	Metalist Kharkiv	0 – 2	Shakhtar Donetsk	Lviv
19:00 EET (UTC+2)	Kucher 4'; Hladkyy 54'; Kovalenko (yellow card) 88'	Summary	Bobko (yellow card) 90'	Stadium: Arena Lviv; Attendance: 1,712; Referee: Sergiy Berezka

8 April 2015 Quarterfinal 2nd Leg	Shakhtar Donetsk	1 – 0 (3 – 0 agg.)	Metalist Kharkiv	Lviv
19:00 EEST (UTC+3)	Luiz Adriano 49'	Report	Osman (yellow card) 53'	Stadium: Arena Lviv; Attendance: 2,253; Referee: Sergei Lysenchuk

29 April 2015 Semifinal 1st Leg	Dnipro Dnipropetrovsk	0 – 1	Shakhtar Donetsk	Dnipropetrovsk
19:00 EET (UTC+2)	Matos (yellow card) 69'; Ksyonz (yellow card) 90+2'; Douglas (yellow card) 90+5'	Summary	Stepanenko (yellow card) 26'; Hladkyy 45+1'; Rakytskiy (yellow card) 48'; Kucher (yellow card) 50'; Fred (yellow card) 65'	Stadium: Dnipro-Arena; Attendance: 20,401; Referee: Yuri Mozharovskiy

20 May 2015 Semifinal 2nd Leg	Shakhtar Donetsk	1 – 1 (2 – 1 agg.)	Dnipro Dnipropetrovsk	Lviv
19:30 EEST (UTC+3)	Teixeira (yellow card) 33'; Luiz Adriano 77' (pen.); Fred (yellow card) 79'; Srna (yellow card) 80'; Pyatov (yellow card) 90+5'	Report	Kalinić 30'; Kankava (yellow card) 33'; Fedetskyi (yellow card) 39'; Konoplyanka (yellow card) 79'	Stadium: Arena Lviv; Attendance: 15,300; Referee: Anatoliy Abdula

==== Final ====
4 June 2015	Dynamo Kyiv	0 – 0 (5 – 4 p)	Shakhtar Donetsk	Kyiv
21:00 EEST (UTC+3)	Kravets (yellow card) 56'; Yarmolenko (yellow card) 62'; Dragović (yellow card) 68'; Rybalka (yellow card) 81' (yellow-red card) 115'; Khacheridi (yellow card) 82'; Vida (yellow card) 88'	Report	Ilsinho (yellow card) 44'; Srna (yellow card) 55'; Taison (yellow card) 120'	Stadium: NSC Olimpiyskiy Stadium; Attendance: 53,455; Referee: Yuriy Mozharovsky
	Penalties
	Veloso (penalty missed); Dragović (penalty scored); Antunes (penalty missed); Husyev (penalty scored); Yarmolenko (penalty scored); Belhanda (penalty scored); Khacheridi (penalty scored)		Srna (penalty scored); Luiz Adriano (penalty scored); Douglas Costa (penalty scored); Taison (penalty missed); Rakytskiy (penalty missed); Teixeira (penalty scored); Hladkyy (penalty missed)

=== UEFA Champions League ===
==== Group stage ====
Pos	Team	Pld	W	D	L	GF	GA	GD	Pts	Qualification	POR	SHK	ATH	BATE
1	(Portugal) Porto	6	4	2	0	16	4	+12	14	Advance to knockout phase	—	1–1	2–1	6–0
2	(Ukraine) Shakhtar Donetsk	6	2	3	1	15	4	+11	9	Advance to knockout phase	2–2	—	0–1	5–0
3	(Spain) Athletic Bilbao	6	2	1	3	5	6	−1	7	Transfer to Europa League	0–2	0–0	—	2–0
4	(Belarus) BATE Borisov	6	1	0	5	2	24	−22	3		0–3	0–7	2–1	—

Source: UEFA
Rules for classification: Group stage tiebreakers

17 September 2014 1	Athletic Bilbao (Spain)	0 – 0	(Ukraine) Shakhtar Donetsk	Bilbao. Spain
21:45 EEST (UTC+3)	Iturraspe (yellow card) 38'; Aduriz (yellow card) 58'; Susaeta (yellow card) 88'	Report	Srna (yellow card) 29'; Taison (yellow card) 35'; Kucher (yellow card) 48'	Stadium: San Mamés; Attendance: 48,351; Referee: Anastasios Sidiropoulos (Greece)

30 September 2014 2	Shakhtar Donetsk (Ukraine)	2 – 2	(Portugal) Porto	Lviv, Ukraine
21:45 EEST (UTC+3)	Kucher (yellow card) 34'; Stepanenko (yellow card) 36'; Srna (yellow card) 48'; Teixeira 52'; Fernando (yellow card) 69'; Adriano 85'; Ilsinho (yellow card) 90'	Report	Óliver (yellow card) 35'; Maicon (yellow card) 48'; Martínez 89' (pen.), 90+4'	Stadium: Arena Lviv; Attendance: 33,217; Referee: Cüneyt Çakır (Turkey)

21 October 2014 3	BATE Borisov (Belarus)	0 – 7	(Ukraine) Shakhtar Donetsk	Barysaw, Belarus
21:45 EEST (UTC+3)	Chernik (yellow card) 27'; Mladenović (yellow card) 80'	Report	Teixeira 11'; Luiz Adriano 28' (pen.), 36', 40', 44', 82' (pen.), (yellow card) 88'; Douglas Costa 35'	Stadium: Borisov Arena; Attendance: 12,113; Referee: Ivan Bebek (Croatia)

5 November 2014 4	Shakhtar Donetsk (Ukraine)	5 – 0	(Belarus) BATE Borisov	Lviv, Ukraine
21:45 EET (UTC+2)	Srna 19'; Luiz Adriano (yellow card) 45+3', (goal) 58' (pen.), 83', 90+3'; Teixeira 48'	Report	Khagush (yellow card) 45+3' (yellow-red card) 45+3'	Stadium: Arena Lviv; Attendance: 29,173; Referee: Wolfgang Stark (Germany)

25 November 2014 5	Shakhtar Donetsk (Ukraine)	0 – 1	(Spain) Athletic Bilbao	Lviv, Ukraine
21:45 EET (UTC+2)	Kucher (yellow card) 58'; Luiz Adriano (yellow card) 74'; Srna (yellow card) 85'; Stepanenko (yellow card) 89'	Report	Iturraspe (yellow card) 50'; Gurpegui (yellow card) 63'; Viguera (yellow card) 66'; San José 68'; López (yellow card) 90+2'	Stadium: Arena Lviv; Attendance: 33,489; Referee: Mark Clattenburg (England)

10 December 2014 6	Porto (Portugal)	1 – 1	(Ukraine) Shakhtar Donetsk	Porto, Portugal
21:45 EET (UTC+2)	Quaresma (yellow card) 8'; Marcano (yellow card) 64'; Aboubakar 87'	Report	Rakytskiy (yellow card) 19'; Stepanenko (yellow card) 43', (goal) 50'	Stadium: Estádio do Dragão; Attendance: 28,010; Referee: Ruddy Buquet (France)

==== Knockout stage ====
17 February 2015 Round of 16 1st leg	Shakhtar Donetsk (Ukraine)	0 – 0	(Germany) Bayern Munich	Lviv, Ukraine
21:45 EET (UTC+2)	Srna (yellow card) 38'; Douglas Costa (yellow card) 58'; Fred (yellow card) 77'	Report	Rafinha (yellow card) 23'; Alonso (yellow card) 24' (yellow-red card) 65'; Boateng (yellow card) 80'; Schweinsteiger (yellow card) 84'	Stadium: Arena Lviv; Attendance: 34,187; Referee: Alberto Undiano Mallenco (Spain)

11 March 2015 Round of 16 2nd leg	Bayern Munich (Germany)	7 – 0 (7 – 0 agg.)	(Ukraine) Shakhtar Donetsk	Munich, Germany
21:45 EET (UTC+2)	Müller 4' (pen.), 52'; Badstuber (yellow card) 26', (goal) 63'; Boateng 34' (yellow card) 38'; Ribéry 49'; Lewandowski 75'; Götze 87'	Report	Kucher (red card) 3'; Douglas Costa (yellow card) 38'	Stadium: Allianz Arena; Attendance: 70,000; Referee: William Collum (Scotland)

== Squad statistics ==
As of match played 4 June 2015

=== Appearances and goals ===
No.	Pos	Nat	Player	Total		Premier League		Ukrainian Cup		UEFA Champions League		Supercup	
No.	Pos	Nat	Player	Apps	Goals	Apps	Goals	Apps	Goals	Apps	Goals	Apps	Goals
4	DF	(Ukraine) UKR	Oleksandr Volovyk	1	0	0	0	1	0	0	0	0	0
5	DF	(Ukraine) UKR	Oleksandr Kucher	23	1	9+2	0	5	1	6	0	1	0
6	MF	(Ukraine) UKR	Taras Stepanenko	36	5	23	4	5	0	7	1	1	0
7	MF	(Brazil) BRA	Wellington Nem	15	4	0+8	3	3+2	1	0+2	0	0	0
8	MF	(Brazil) BRA	Fred	36	1	14+9	1	2+4	0	3+4	0	0	0
9	FW	(Brazil) BRA	Luiz Adriano	34	21	20+2	9	3+1	3	7	9	1	0
10	MF	(Brazil) BRA	Bernard	24	2	6+9	0	3+1	2	1+4	0	0	0
11	MF	(Brazil) BRA	Marlos	35	6	12+9	5	6+1	0	0+6	0	0+1	1
13	DF	(Ukraine) UKR	Vyacheslav Shevchuk	28	1	17	1	4	0	6	0	1	0
17	MF	(Brazil) BRA	Fernando	26	1	12+2	1	3+1	0	6+1	0	1	0
18	DF	(Ukraine) UKR	Ivan Ordets	14	0	10	0	3	0	1	0	0	0
20	MF	(Brazil) BRA	Douglas Costa	34	5	15+6	4	3+2	0	8	1	0	0
21	FW	(Ukraine) UKR	Oleksandr Hladkyy	31	16	14+6	11	5+2	4	1+2	0	1	1
23	GK	(Ukraine) UKR	Bohdan Sarnavskyi	3	0	0	0	3	0	0	0	0	0
28	MF	(Brazil) BRA	Taison	37	4	19+3	4	2+4	0	7+1	0	1	0
29	MF	(Brazil) BRA	Alex Teixeira	37	22	18+4	17	6+1	2	8	3	0	0
30	GK	(Ukraine) UKR	Andriy Pyatov	29	0	16	0	5	0	8	0	0	0
31	DF	(Brazil) BRA	Ismaily	10	0	8	0	1+1	0	0	0	0	0
32	GK	(Ukraine) UKR	Anton Kanibolotskyi	12	0	11	0	0	0	0	0	1	0
33	DF	(Croatia) CRO	Darijo Srna	37	6	24	5	5	0	7	1	1	0
38	DF	(Ukraine) UKR	Serhiy Kryvtsov	21	3	16+1	3	0+2	0	1+1	0	0	0
44	DF	(Ukraine) UKR	Yaroslav Rakytskiy	32	2	18+1	2	4	0	8	0	1	0
66	DF	(Brazil) BRA	Márcio Azevedo	6	0	1+1	0	2	0	2	0	0	0
72	MF	(Ukraine) UKR	Viktor Kovalenko	4	0	0+2	0	2	0	0	0	0	0
77	MF	(Brazil) BRA	Ilsinho	22	0	11+3	0	4	0	1+2	0	1	0
89	FW	(Brazil) BRA	Dentinho	16	2	1+10	1	4+1	1	0	0	0	0
Players away from the club on loan:
24	MF	(Ukraine) UKR	Dmytro Hrechyshkin	1	0	0	0	0	0	0	0	0+1	0
50	MF	(Ukraine) UKR	Serhiy Bolbat	2	0	0+1	0	0	0	0	0	0+1	0
Players who appeared for Shakhtar who left the club during the season:
27	DF	(Ukraine) UKR	Dmytro Chyhrynskyi	3	1	1	0	2	1	0	0	0	0

=== Goalscorers ===
Place	Position	Nation	Number	Name	Premier League	Ukrainian Cup	Champions League	Super Cup	Total
1	MF	(Brazil)	29	Alex Teixeira	17	2	3	0	22
2	FW	(Brazil)	9	Luiz Adriano	9	3	9	0	21
3	FW	(Ukraine)	21	Oleksandr Hladkyy	11	4	0	1	16
4	DF	(Croatia)	33	Darijo Srna	5	0	1	0	6
5	MF	(Brazil)	11	Marlos	4	0	0	1	5
5	MF	(Ukraine)	6	Taras Stepanenko	4	0	1	0	5
5	MF	(Brazil)	20	Douglas Costa	4	0	1	0	5
8	MF	(Brazil)	28	Taison	4	0	0	0	4
8	MF	(Brazil)	7	Wellington Nem	3	1	0	0	4
8	MF	(Brazil)	11	Marlos	3	0	0	1	4
11	DF	(Ukraine)	38	Serhiy Kryvtsov	3	0	0	0	3
12	DF	(Ukraine)	44	Yaroslav Rakytskiy	2	0	0	0	2
12	FW	(Brazil)	89	Dentinho	1	1	0	0	2
12	MF	(Brazil)	10	Bernard	0	2	0	0	2
12				Own goal	1	1	0	0	2
16	MF	(Brazil)	17	Fernando	1	0	0	0	1
16	MF	(Brazil)	8	Fred	1	0	0	0	1
16	DF	(Ukraine)	13	Vyacheslav Shevchuk	1	0	0	0	1
16	DF	(Ukraine)	27	Dmytro Chyhrynskyi	0	1	0	0	1
16	DF	(Ukraine)	5	Oleksandr Kucher	0	1	0	0	1
TOTALS					71	15	15	2	103

=== Clean sheets ===
Place	Position	Nation	Number	Name	Premier League	Ukrainian Cup	Champions League	Super Cup	Total
1	GK	(Ukraine)	30	Andriy Pyatov	8	3	4	0	15
2	GK	(Ukraine)	32	Anton Kanibolotskyi	6	0	0	1	7
3	GK	(Ukraine)	23	Bohdan Sarnavskyi	0	2	0	0	2
				TOTALS	14	5	4	1	24

=== Disciplinary record ===
Number	Nation	Position	Name	Premier League		Ukrainian Cup		Champions League		Super Cup		Total	
Number	Nation	Position	Name	Yellow card	Red card	Yellow card	Red card	Yellow card	Red card	Yellow card	Red card	Yellow card	Red card
5	(Ukraine)	DF	Oleksandr Kucher	4	1	1	0	3	1	0	0	8	2
6	(Ukraine)	MF	Taras Stepanenko	5	0	1	0	3	0	1	0	10	0
7	(Brazil)	MF	Wellington Nem	1	0	1	0	0	0	0	0	2	0
8	(Brazil)	MF	Fred	4	0	2	0	1	0	0	0	7	0
9	(Brazil)	FW	Luiz Adriano	3	0	0	0	3	0	1	0	7	0
10	(Brazil)	MF	Bernard	1	0	0	0	0	0	0	0	1	0
11	(Brazil)	MF	Marlos	3	0	0	0	0	0	0	0	3	0
13	(Ukraine)	DF	Vyacheslav Shevchuk	2	1	0	0	0	0	0	0	2	1
17	(Brazil)	MF	Fernando	2	0	0	0	1	0	0	0	3	0
18	(Ukraine)	DF	Ivan Ordets	2	2	0	0	0	0	0	0	2	2
20	(Brazil)	MF	Douglas Costa	3	0	0	0	2	0	0	0	5	0
21	(Brazil)	FW	Oleksandr Hladkyy	1	0	0	0	0	0	0	0	1	0
28	(Brazil)	MF	Taison	2	0	1	0	1	0	0	0	4	0
29	(Brazil)	MF	Alex Teixeira	5	0	2	0	0	0	0	0	7	0
30	(Ukraine)	GK	Andriy Pyatov	0	0	1	0	0	0	0	0	1	0
32	(Ukraine)	GK	Anton Kanibolotskiy	1	0	0	0	0	0	0	0	1	0
33	(Croatia)	DF	Darijo Srna	5	0	2	0	4	0	0	0	11	0
38	(Ukraine)	DF	Serhiy Kryvtsov	2	0	0	0	0	0	0	0	2	0
44	(Ukraine)	DF	Yaroslav Rakytskiy	7	2	1	0	1	0	0	0	9	2
74	(Ukraine)	MF	Viktor Kovalenko	0	0	1	0	0	0	0	0	1	0
77	(Brazil)	MF	Ilsinho	6	0	2	0	1	0	1	0	10	0
89	(Brazil)	FW	Dentinho	1	0	0	0	0	0	0	0	1	0
Players away on loan:
Players who left Shakhtar Donetsk during the season:
			TOTALS	60	6	15	0	20	1	3	0	98	7

== Notes ==
4. Shakhtar Donetsk play their home matches at Arena Lviv, Lviv instead of their regular stadium, Donbas Arena, Donetsk, due to the War in Donbas.
