= 2013 Ukrainian Super Cup =

Chornomorets Odesa	Shakhtar Donetsk
1	3
- Date: 10 July 2013
- Venue: Chornomorets Stadium, Odesa
- Referee: Serhiy Boyko
- Attendance: 32,400

The 2013 Ukrainian Super Cup became the tenth edition of Ukrainian Super Cup, an annual football match contested by the winners of the previous season's Ukrainian Top League and Ukrainian Cup competitions.

The match was played at the Chornomorets Stadium, Odesa, on 10 July 2013, and contested by league and cup winner Shakhtar Donetsk and cup runner-up Chornomorets Odesa. Shakhtar won it 3–1.

== Match ==
=== Details ===
10 July 2013

Chornomorets Odesa	1–3	Shakhtar Donetsk
Antonov 45+1'	Report	Fred 17', 33'; Taison 68' (pen.)

Chornomorets Stadium, Odesa
Attendance: 32,400
Referee: Serhiy Boyko

Chornomorets Odesa

Shakhtar Donetsk

GK	12	(Ukraine) Dmytro Bezotosnyi (c)
DF	4	(Austria) Markus Berger
DF	29	(Argentina) Pablo Fontanello
DF	77	(Ukraine) Pavlo Kutas
DF	32	(Albania) Kristi Vangjeli		(substituted off) 69'
MF	8	(Ukraine) Kyrylo Kovalchuk
MF	10	(Ukraine) Oleksiy Hai
MF	23	(Ivory Coast) Franck Dja Djédjé		(substituted off) 87'
MF	99	(Spain) Sito Riera		(substituted off) 46'
MF	19	(Albania) Elis Bakaj
FW	69	(Ukraine) Oleksiy Antonov	45+1'
Substitutes:
GK	1	(Ukraine) Yevhen Past
DF	2	(Ukraine) Petro Kovalchuk
DF	25	(Ukraine) Yevhen Martynenko
DF	33	(Ukraine) Andriy Slinkin		(substituted on) 87'
MF	11	(Ukraine) Ivan Bobko		(substituted on) 69'
FW	9	(Ukraine) Anatoliy Didenko
FW	18	(Russia) Sergey Samodin		(substituted on) 46'
Manager :
	(Ukraine) Roman Hryhorchuk

GK	32	(Ukraine) Anton Kanibolotskiy
DF	33	(Croatia) Darijo Srna (c)
DF	5	(Ukraine) Oleksandr Kucher		(substituted off) 82'
DF	44	(Ukraine) Yaroslav Rakitskyi
DF	13	(Ukraine) Vyacheslav Shevchuk
MF	3	(Czech Republic) Tomáš Hübschman		(substituted off) 78'
MF	29	(Brazil) Alex Teixeira		(substituted off) 73'
MF	20	(Brazil) Douglas Costa
MF	7	(Brazil) Fred	17', 33'
MF	28	(Brazil) Taison	35' (pen.)
FW	9	(Brazil) Luiz Adriano
Substitutes:
GK	30	(Ukraine) Andriy Pyatov
DF	31	(Brazil) Ismaily
DF	14	(Ukraine) Vasyl Kobin
DF	27	(Ukraine) Dmytro Chyhrynskyi		(substituted on) 82'
MF	6	(Ukraine) Taras Stepanenko		(substituted on) 78'
MF	24	(Ukraine) Dmytro Hrechyshkin		(substituted on) 73'
FW	99	(Brazil) Maicon
Manager :
	(Romania) Mircea Lucescu
