= 2014 Ukrainian Super Cup =

Dynamo Kyiv	Shakhtar Donetsk
0	2
- Date: 22 July 2014
- Venue: Arena Lviv, Lviv
- Referee: Yuriy Mozharovskyi
- Attendance: 34,347

The 2014 Ukrainian Super Cup became the eleventh edition of Ukrainian Super Cup, an annual football match contested by the winners of the previous season's Ukrainian Top League and Ukrainian Cup competitions.

The match was played at the Arena Lviv, Lviv, on 22 July 2014, and contested by league winner Shakhtar Donetsk and cup winner Dynamo Kyiv. Shakhtar won it 2–0.

== Match ==
=== Details ===
22 July 2014

Dynamo Kyiv	0–2	Shakhtar Donetsk
	Report	Hladkyi 75'; Marlos 90+3'

Arena Lviv, Lviv
Attendance: 34,347
Referee: Yuriy Mozharovskyi

Dynamo Kyiv	Shakhtar Donetsk

GK	1	(Ukraine) Oleksandr Shovkovskyi (c)
DF	2	(Brazil) Danilo Silva	(yellow card) 30'
DF	6	(Austria) Aleksandar Dragović
DF	24	(Croatia) Domagoj Vida
DF	27	(Ukraine) Yevhen Makarenko
MF	10	(Ukraine) Andriy Yarmolenko	(yellow card) 51'
MF	9	(Ukraine) Roman Bezus	(yellow card) 61'	(substituted off) 79'
MF	17	(Ukraine) Serhiy Rybalka
MF	45	(Ukraine) Vladyslav Kalitvintsev		(substituted off) 68'
MF	90	(Morocco) Younès Belhanda	(yellow card) 23'	(substituted off) 84'
FW	85	(Democratic Republic of the Congo) Dieumerci Mbokani	(yellow card) 80'
Substitutes:
GK	23	(Ukraine) Oleksandr Rybka
DF	3	(Ukraine) Yevhen Selin
MF	5	(Croatia) Ognjen Vukojević
MF	16	(Ukraine) Serhiy Sydorchuk
MF	20	(Ukraine) Oleh Husyev		(substituted in) 68'
MF	25	(Nigeria) Lukman Haruna		(substituted in) 79'
FW	22	(Ukraine) Artem Kravets		(substituted in) 84'
Manager :
	(Ukraine) Serhii Rebrov

GK	32	(Ukraine) Anton Kanibolotskiy
DF	33	(Croatia) Darijo Srna (c)
DF	44	(Ukraine) Yaroslav Rakitskyi
DF	5	(Ukraine) Oleksandr Kucher
DF	13	(Ukraine) Vyacheslav Shevchuk
MF	6	(Ukraine) Taras Stepanenko	(yellow card) 86'	(substituted off) 90+5'
MF	17	(Brazil) Fernando		(substituted off) 73'
MF	28	(Brazil) Taison		(substituted off) 86'
MF	77	(Brazil) Ilsinho	(yellow card) 23'
FW	9	(Brazil) Luiz Adriano	(yellow card) 82'
FW	21	(Ukraine) Oleksandr Hladkyi	75'
Substitutes:
GK	30	(Ukraine) Andriy Pyatov
DF	14	(Ukraine) Vasyl Kobin
DF	18	(Ukraine) Ivan Ordets
DF	38	(Ukraine) Serhiy Kryvtsov
MF	24	(Ukraine) Dmytro Hrechyshkin		(substituted in) 90+5'
MF	11	(Brazil) Marlos		(substituted in) 86'
FW	50	(Ukraine) Serhiy Bolbat		(substituted in) 73'
Manager :
	(Romania) Mircea Lucescu
