= Darijo Srna =

Croatian footballer (born 1982)

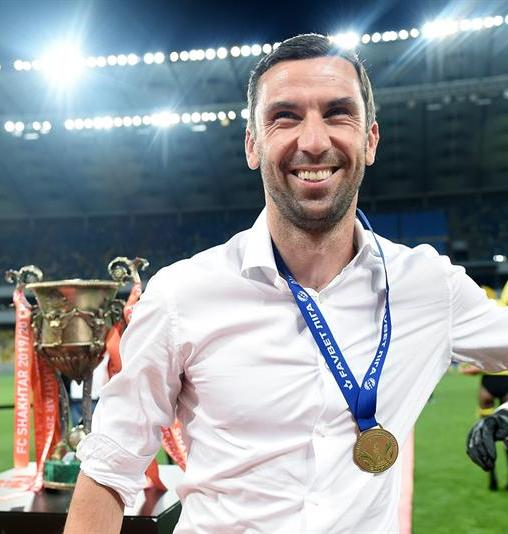
- Srna in 2020

Personal information
- Full name: Darijo Srna
- Date of birth: 1 May 1982 (age 44)
- Place of birth: Metković, SR Croatia, Yugoslavia
- Height: 1.78 m (5 ft 10 in)
- Position: Right wing-back

Team information
- Current team: Shakhtar Donetsk (director of football)

Youth career
- GOŠK Gabela
- 1997–1999: Neretva Metković
- 1999–2000: Hajduk Split

Senior career*
Years	Team	Apps	(Gls)
1999–2003	Hajduk Split	64	(4)
2003–2018	Shakhtar Donetsk	339	(33)
2018–2019	Cagliari	26	(0)
Total		429	(37)

International career
1998	Croatia U15	1	(0)
1999–2000	Croatia U17	5	(4)
2000–2001	Croatia U19	7	(3)
2000–2001	Croatia U20	2	(0)
2001–2004	Croatia U21	10	(4)
2002–2016	Croatia	134	(22)

Managerial career
- 2023: Shakhtar Donetsk (caretaker)
- * Club domestic league appearances and goals

Darijo Srna (Croatian pronunciation: [dâːrijo sř̩na]; born 1 May 1982) is a Croatian former professional footballer and current director of football of Ukrainian Premier League club Shakhtar Donetsk. During most of his career he played as a right wing-back.

He began his career at Hajduk Split, before moving to Shakhtar in 2003. He has won numerous trophies during his time at Shakhtar, including a UEFA Cup title in 2009, seven Ukrainian Premier League titles, five Ukrainian Cup titles and five Ukrainian Super Cup titles. He left Shakhtar in 2018 and signed a one-year contract with Cagliari and then returned to Shakhtar to work as an assistant manager.

Srna made his international debut for Croatia in November 2002 and is the third most capped player in the history of the Croatia national team with 134 caps, having represented his country at the 2006 and 2014 FIFA World Cups, as well as at UEFA Euro 2004, 2008, 2012 and 2016. In 2009, then manager Slaven Bilić made him the captain of the national team, a position he would hold until his retirement from international football in 2016; the captaincy then passed to Luka Modrić.

He is the most capped player in Shakhtar's history, with 536 appearances. He was popularly dubbed the "Icon of Shakhtar". Srna's consistent quality and playing style earned comparisons to Cafu.

== Club career ==
=== Hajduk Split ===
Srna's talent was seen by many scouts in Croatia while he was young. He was later signed by Hajduk Split as his talent became desirable for the Croatian giants. At Hajduk, he won the 1999–2000 and 2002–03 Croatian Cup, as well as the 2000–01 Prva HNL. The club played in the first round of 1999–2000 UEFA Cup, 2001–02 UEFA Cup, 2002–03 UEFA Cup, as well as the second round of the 2000–01 UEFA Champions League and the third round of the 2001–02 UEFA Champions League. He made 84 appearances for the club, including 64 in the league, and scored eight goals, four of which came in the league, before moving to Ukrainian club Shakhtar Donetsk.

=== Shakhtar Donetsk ===
In 2003, Srna was sold, along with Hajduk goalkeeper Stipe Pletikosa, to Shakhtar Donetsk. He is a common member and the captain in his club side, for whom he has made a large impact in the league. In his first season with the club, he made 29 appearances, including 19 in the league, scoring three goals, all in the Ukrainian Cup. He helped the club to win the Ukrainian Cup, his first honour with the club, and to a second-place finish in the Premier League.

In his second season, Shakhtar won the Super Cup and the Premier League. He made 42 appearances for the club, 22 of which came in the league, and netted two goals, once in the league and once in the cup. Srna made his debut in the main stage of the UEFA Champions League on 14 September 2004 against Milan. His third season saw Shakhtar retain the Premier League title. He made 21 league appearances, scoring twice. After the 2006 FIFA World Cup, Benfica were reported to be after the player's signature, but nothing materialized, with what many considered a fallen or rejected sale. Since then, he had been linked with a number of other clubs, including Lazio, but a move never materialized.

The following season, Shakhtar were beaten to the Premier League title by Dynamo Kyiv, as they failed to win any silverware. Darijo made 35 appearances for the club, 20 in the league, and scored four times, three of which came in the league. In the 2007–08 season, Shakhtar picked up the Premier League trophy and were victorious in the Ukrainian Cup Final. He made 41 appearances, 28 of which came in the league.

==== 2008–09 season ====
The 2008–09 season saw Shakhtar win the Super Cup and the UEFA Cup. On 15 July 2008, Shakhtar emerged victorious in the Super Cup Final against Dynamo Kyiv. At the end of extra time, the teams were level at 1–1. In the ensuing penalty shoot-out, Shakhtar converted all five of its penalties to win 5–3. Srna, who captained the side, scored one of the penalties. On 3 August, he scored the first goal in a 3–0 victory over Illichivets Mariupol. On 13 August, he scored the first goal in a 2–0 victory over Dinamo Zagreb in the Champions League. On 18 October he scored a goal in Shakhtar's 4–2 win against Kryvbas. On 2 March, he scored the winning goal in Shakhtar's 2–1 league victory over Illichivets. On 22 March, he scored the only goal in a league win over Vorskla. In the semi-final of the UEFA Cup, Shakhtar faced Dynamo Kyiv in an all-Ukrainian tie. After a 1–1 away draw in the first leg, Shakhtar won 2–1 at the Donbas Arena for a 3–2 aggregate win to progress to the final. Darijo played the full 90 minutes of both legs. On 20 May 2009, he captained Shakhtar in the 2–1 victory over Werder Bremen in the UEFA Cup Final. Srna provided the assist for Jádson's winning goal seven minutes into extra time. He also picked up a yellow card. This was the last UEFA Cup before it was rebranded as the UEFA Europa League. Shakhtar finished the Premier League season in second position, 15 points behind champions Dynamo Kyiv. Darijo made 46 appearances and scored five goals, with 25 appearances and 4 goals in the league.

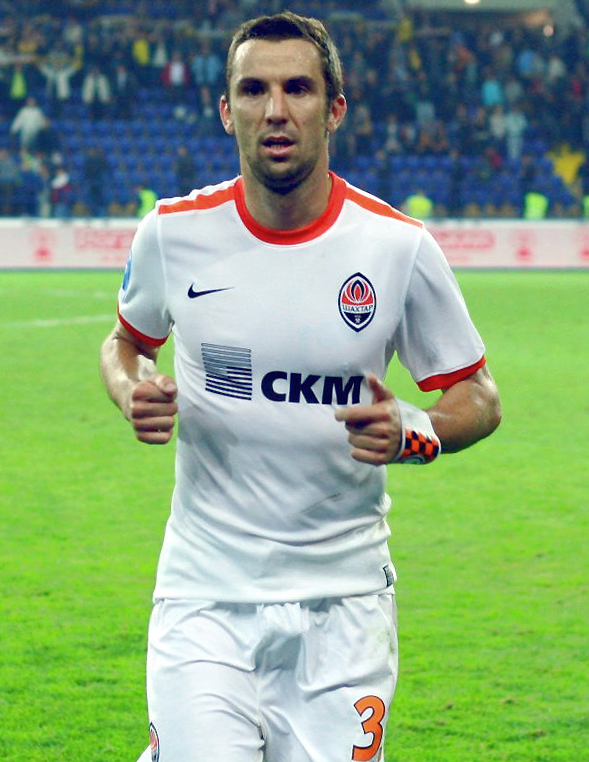
Playing for Shakhtar in 2009

==== 2009–10 season ====
In the 2009–10 season, Shakhtar regained the Premier League title. On 28 August, he played in Shakhtar's 1–0 extra time loss to Barcelona in the 2009 UEFA Super Cup, picking up a yellow card on 65 minutes. He scored the third goal in a 4–1 away victory over Club Brugge in the Europa League. He scored a goal and picked up a yellow card in a 2–0 Ukrainian Cup victory over Dynamo Kyiv on 28 October. He netted his first league goal of the season in a 2–1 victory against Zorya Luhansk on 20 March. On 3 April, he scored the only goal in a league victory over Obolon. Srna played 39 matches, 26 in the league, and scored four goals, two of which came in the league.

==== 2010–11 season ====
The 2010–11 season was extremely successful for Shakhtar as they won the treble (Premier League, Ukrainian Cup and the Super Cup). He played in Shakhtar's 7–1 Super Cup victory over Tavriya Simferopol on 4 July. On 15 September, he netted the only goal, and picked up a yellow card, in a 1–0 Champions League win over Partizan. In the following match, against Tavriya, after going 1–0 down, Srna scored the equaliser in a 4–1 victory. On 30 October, he was sent off in added time against Dnipro Dnipropetrovsk as Shakhtar won 1–0. On 1 April, he scored the first goal in a 3–1 victory over Illichivets Mariupol. On 7 May, against Metalurh Donetsk, he scored the second goal in a 2–0 win. On 25 May, he played in the 2–0 Ukrainian Cup Final victory over Dynamo Kyiv, picking up a yellow card. Srna was named in the UEFA Champions League Team of the Year according to player rater (statistics) in the 2010–11 season, where Shakhtar lost in the quarter-final to Barcelona. Srna created five assists in five games. He made 39 appearances, 27 of which were in the league, scoring four goals, three of which came in the league.

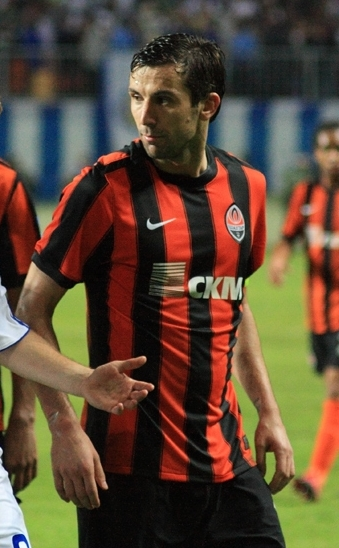
Srna playing for Shakhtar in 2011

==== 2011–12 season ====
Shakhtar won the Premier League and the Ukrainian Cup in the 2011–12 season, Darijo's sixth league title with the club. He scored a goal in first half injury time in a 2–0 away win over Metalurh Donetsk. On 2 December, he scored the first goal in a 5–0 league victory over Arsenal Kyiv at the Donbas Arena. On 16 April, in the 27th gameweek of the season, Srna netted the final goal in a 5–1 victory over Zorya Luhansk. On 6 May, he played in the Ukrainian Cup Final against Metalurh Donetsk in which Shakhtar emerged victorious after an extra time winner from Oleksandr Kucher made it 2–1. This marked Srna's fourth Ukrainian Cup success with Shakhtar. He picked up a yellow card in the final match of the season, a 3–0 victory over Oleksandriya. Shakhtar won the league by four points over Dynamo Kyiv; Srna scored 3 goals in 25 league matches and made a total of 34 appearances in the season.

==== 2012–13 season ====
Darijo began the 2012–13 season with an assist for Luiz Adriano in the sixth-minute of Shakhtar's 2–0 Super Cup victory over Metalurh Donetsk. He assisted Ilsinho for the second goal in a 3–1 Premier League win against Hoverla Uzhhorod. He assisted Fernandinho for a 93rd-minute winner against Kryvbas Kryvyi Rih. and added another for Marko Dević in a 4–0 victory against Volyn Lutsk. On 19 August, Srna assisted Willian for the third goal in a 5–1 win against Chornomorets Odesa In the next match, he provided Luiz Adriano with an assist in a 3–0 win over Karpaty Lviv. On 2 September, he assisted Oleksandr Kucher's second goal in a 3–1 victory against Dynamo Kyiv. On 23 September, Srna scored a free-kick in a 4–1 victory over Dynamo Kyiv in the last 32 of the Ukrainian Cup. On 28 September, he scored the winning goal in a 2–1 victory against Dnipro Dnipropetrovsk. He picked up the Man of the Match award for his contribution to win over Dnipro. On 19 October, he assisted Ilsinho for a goal in a 2–1 victory against Illichivets.

On 13 February 2013, Srna netted with an expertly-struck free-kick in the 31st minute in the first leg of the Champions League Round of 16 tie with Borussia Dortmund, which ended in a 2–2 draw. At the end of the 2012–13 season in Ukraine, he finished with the most assists, with 12.

==== 2013–14 season ====
In mid-season, Srna helped Shakhtar win the 2014 United Supercup, a tournament between the top-two placed clubs from Russia and Ukraine, becoming the assists leader and joint top scorer of the tournament. By the end of the season, the club won the Ukraine Premier League and the 2014 Ukrainian Super Cup.

==== 2014–15 season ====
In the first game of the season, Srna set a new record of games played for Shakhtar in the Premier League.

==== 2015–16 season ====
In the 2015–16 season, Srna played 41 games and scored six goals. Shakhtar announced that their captain had extended his contract for the 2016–17 season, a day after the club celebrated their 80th anniversary.

==== Doping case ====
He was suspended from 22 September 2017 until 22 August 2018 for a failed doping test for dehydroepiandrosterone.

=== Cagliari Calcio ===
On 22 June 2018, Srna signed a one-year deal with Italian side Cagliari Calcio with an option to extend it for another year. In June 2019, the contract ended and Srna left the club.

=== Return to Donetsk ===
In July 2019, Srna returned to Shakhtar Shakhtar Donetsk as an assistant manager on a one-year contract until 2020. He then moved on to the Director of football role.

== International career ==
=== Euro 2004 ===
Srna made his full international debut for the Croatia national team in a friendly match against Romania in November 2002. He went on to score his first international goal on his competitive debut for Croatia in their UEFA Euro 2004 qualifier against Belgium in March 2003, netting the opening goal in Croatia's 4–0 win. He made a total of six appearances in Croatia's qualifying campaign for Euro 2004, including both play-off matches against Slovenia.

At the Euro 2004 finals, he appeared as a substitute in Croatia's group matches against Switzerland and England, before they were knocked out in the first round.

=== 2006 World Cup ===
After Euro 2004, Srna went on to become one of the key players in Croatia's 2006 FIFA World Cup qualifying campaign, scoring five goals in nine appearances and being the team's top goalscorer in the competition. During the 2006 World Cup qualifying, he scored both goals in Croatia's two 1–0 wins over Sweden, including a long-range free kick in the away fixture in Gothenburg. He also netted both goals in Croatia's 2–2 home draw against Bulgaria, as well as one goal in their 3–1 away win at Iceland.

Srna then starred in all three of Croatia's games at the 2006 World Cup. He was highly praised and remembered for his spectacular 30-yard free kick, which put Croatia ahead against Australia in the infamous "Graham Poll three-yellow card" blunder, which ended 2–2. However, in previous group match against Japan he missed a penalty in a 0–0 draw and Croatia finished third in the group stage with only 2 points.

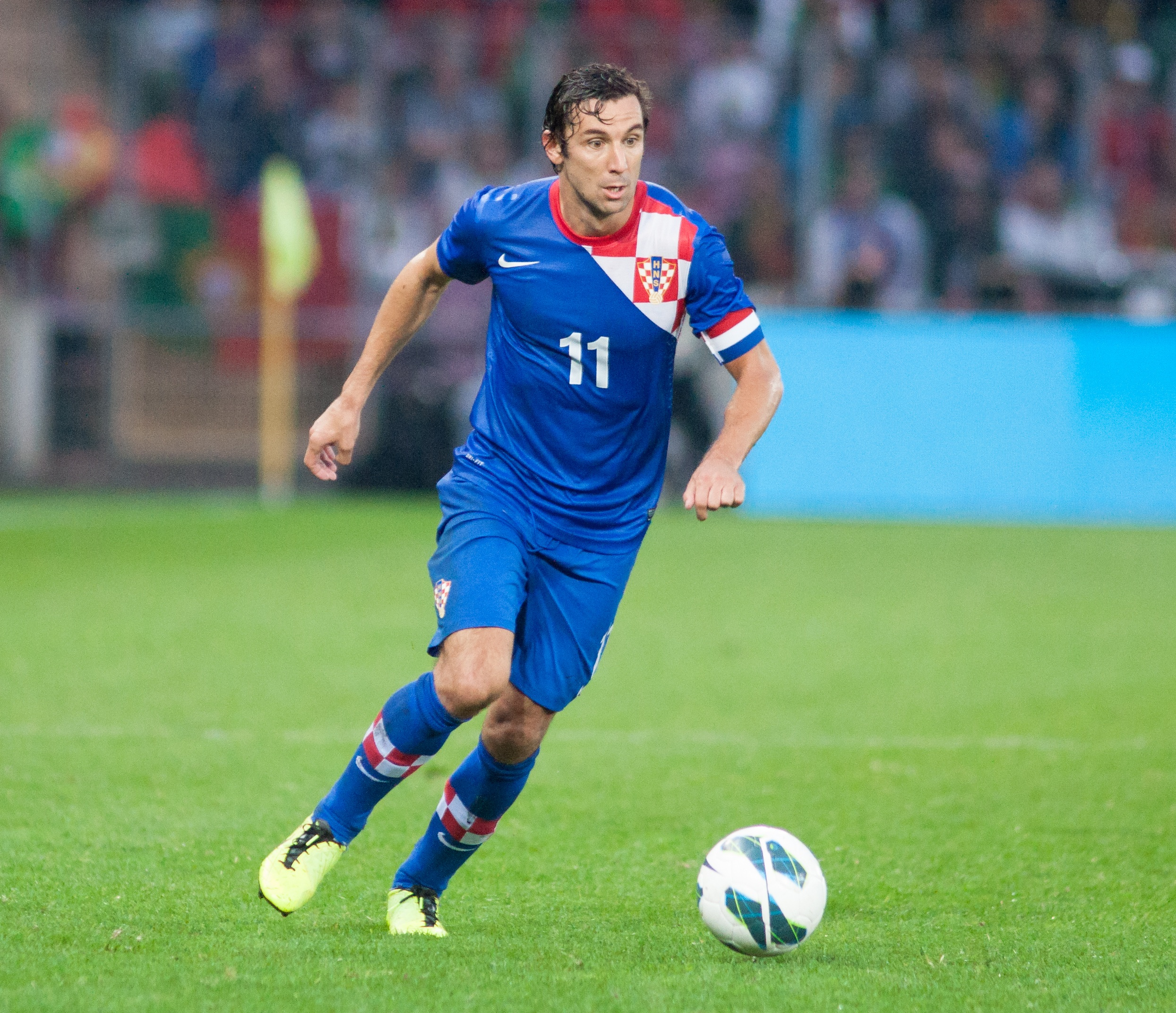
Srna in action for Croatia in 2013

=== Euro 2008 ===
In September 2006, Srna was temporarily dropped from the Croatian squad for a Euro 2008 qualifying match with Russia because of a late night partying spree in a local disco, along with teammates Boško Balaban and Ivica Olić.

Srna was considered the hero of the match when he came on as a substitute against Macedonia in a Euro 2008 qualifying match and scored shortly after from a free-kick, which was shot into the right corner of the goal. In the 88th minute, he provided a cross which found teammate Eduardo, and allowed him to score and snatch a late win for Croatia. He also scored Croatia's equalizer in their hard-fought away victory against Israel, which eventually ended 4–3 in Croatia's favour. Srna went on to miss a penalty against Estonia; however, his overall contribution to the team's attack compensated for the mistake, and Croatia quickly capitalized on it to win 2–0.

Since helping his country qualify for Euro 2008 with a strong qualifying campaign, Srna was unsurprisingly named in their 23-man squad for the current tournament. On 12 June, Srna scored the opening goal in the 24th minute of Croatia's 2–1 victory over Germany in their second game of Group B. He was the only player to score for Croatia in their unsuccessful penalty shootout in the quarter-finals against Turkey. At the conclusion of the match, Srna was seen struggling to hold back tears after Croatia's strong efforts but eventual defeat.

=== Euro 2012 ===
After Euro 2008, Srna succeeded Niko Kovač as national team captain.

Srna started all three games in the 2012 tournament as captain, as Croatia finished third behind Spain and Italy and failed to qualify for the next stage. Italy and Spain went on to become the tournament's finalists.

=== 2014 World Cup ===
On 6 February 2013, Srna won his 100th cap in a friendly match against South Korea at Craven Cottage, London, thereby equalling Dario Šimić as Croatia's most capped player. In that match, Srna also scored his 20th international goal.

Croatia qualified for the 2014 World Cup, where Srna served as team captain for his second official international tournament, after Euro 2012. Croatia finished third in the group behind Brazil and Mexico and therefore failed to qualify for the next stage.

=== Euro 2016 ===
At Euro 2016 in France, Srna, once again serving as team captain, played in Croatia's first group-stage match against Turkey. Shortly after the match, however, he returned to Croatia upon the news of his father's death during the match. He returned to France to finish the tournament afterwards, to abide by his father's dying wish. Croatia reached the knock-out phase of the tournament, but lost 1–0 to Portugal through an extra-time Ricardo Quaresma goal.

Srna amassed 134 caps and 22 goals for Croatia, which made him the country's most capped player at the time of his retirement. He held this record for over eight years, until it was overtaken by Luka Modrić in 2021.

== Personal life ==
Srna was born in Metković on Adriatic coast of southern Dalmatia to Bosniak father Uzeir and Croat mother Milka. His father, a World War II orphan and a former footballer for FK Sarajevo, supported his fledgling football career despite discrimination during the Yugoslav Wars and widespread corruption among football coaches. Before leaving Croatia to join for Shakhtar Donetsk, he gave his parents a brand new Mercedes-Benz A-Class. He has a tattoo of a deer playing football on his leg, as "srna" in Croatian means "roe deer". Srna has also helped Bosnian club Borac Šamac, where his father played as goalkeeper and was also a coach.

Srna has a half-brother, Renato, a coach at Neretva, from their father's first marriage. His other brother, Igor, has Down syndrome. As a result, Srna dedicates all his goals to him, and even revealed a shirt under his jersey saying "Igor, svi smo uz tebe" ("Igor, we are all here for you") after scoring a goal against Macedonia in international play. He also has a tattoo reading "Igor" on his heart.

While at Shakhtar, Srna frequently bought match tickets for orphans and often financed their travel to the stadium at his own expense. In late 2014, he purchased 20 tonnes of mandarins from farms near Metković and had them donated to over 23,000 primary school children in the Donbas region during the ongoing war there. Srna married long-time girlfriend Mirela Forić, whom he met through mutual friend and footballer Boško Balaban. Their daughter Kasja was born in July 2010 and their son Karlo was born in June 2015.

== Career statistics ==
=== Club ===
Club	Season	League			National cup (Note: Includes Croatian Football Cup, Ukrainian Cup, Coppa Italia)		Europe		Other		Total	
Club	Season	Division	Apps	Goals	Apps	Goals	Apps	Goals	Apps	Goals	Apps	Goals
Hajduk Split	1999–2000	Prva HNL	1	0	0	0	–		–		1	0
Hajduk Split	2000–01	Prva HNL	10	0	3	0	–		–		13	0
Hajduk Split	2001–02	Prva HNL	26	1	2	1	5 (Note: Three appearances in UEFA Champions League, two appearances and one goal in UEFA Cup)	1	–		33	3
Hajduk Split	2002–03	Prva HNL	27	3	6	2	4 (Note: Appearances in UEFA Cup)	0	–		37	5
Hajduk Split	Total		64	4	11	3	9	1	–		84	8
Shakhtar Donetsk	2003–04	Vyshcha Liha	19	0	5	3	5 (Note: Four appearances in UEFA Champions League, one appearance in UEFA Cup)	0	–		29	3
Shakhtar Donetsk	2004–05	Vyshcha Liha	22	1	7	1	11 (Note: Seven appearances in UEFA Champions League, four appearances in UEFA Cup)	0	1 (Note: Appearance in Ukrainian Super Cup)	0	41	2
Shakhtar Donetsk	2005–06	Vyshcha Liha	21	2	1	0	10 (Note: Two appearances in UEFA Champions League, eight appearances in UEFA Cup)	0	1	0	33	2
Shakhtar Donetsk	2006–07	Vyshcha Liha	20	3	5	0	9 (Note: Six appearances in UEFA Champions League, three appearances and one goal in UEFA Cup)	1	1	0	35	4
Shakhtar Donetsk	2007–08	Vyshcha Liha	28	0	3	0	10 (Note: Appearance(s) in UEFA Champions League)	0	–		41	0
Shakhtar Donetsk	2008–09	Ukrainian Premier League	25	4	3	0	17 (Note: Eight appearances and one goal in UEFA Champions League, nine appearances in UEFA Cup)	1	1	0	46	5
Shakhtar Donetsk	2009–10	Ukrainian Premier League	26	2	2	1	10 (Note: Two appearances in UEFA Champions League, eight appearances and one goal in UEFA Europa League)	1	1 (Note: Appearance in UEFA Super Cup)	0	39	4
Shakhtar Donetsk	2010–11	Ukrainian Premier League	27	3	2	0	9	1	1	0	39	4
Shakhtar Donetsk	2011–12	Ukrainian Premier League	25	3	3	0	5	0	1	0	34	3
Shakhtar Donetsk	2012–13	Ukrainian Premier League	26	2	5	1	8	1	1	0	40	4
Shakhtar Donetsk	2013–14	Ukrainian Premier League	27	6	2	0	8 (Note: Six appearances in UEFA Champions League, two appearances in UEFA Europa League)	0	1	0	38	6
Shakhtar Donetsk	2014–15	Ukrainian Premier League	23	4	5	0	7	1	1	0	36	5
Shakhtar Donetsk	2015–16	Ukrainian Premier League	19	2	4	0	17 (Note: Nine appearances and two goals in UEFA Champions League, eight appearances and one goal in UEFA Europa League)	3	1	1	41	6
Shakhtar Donetsk	2016–17	Ukrainian Premier League	23	1	1	0	9 (Note: Two appearances in UEFA Champions League, seven appearances and one goal in UEFA Europa League)	0	1	0	34	1
Shakhtar Donetsk	2017–18	Ukrainian Premier League	8	0	0	0	1	0	1	0	10	0
Shakhtar Donetsk	Total		339	33	48	6	136	9	13	1	536	49
Cagliari	2018–19	Serie A	26	0	2	0	–		–		28	0
Career total			429	37	61	9	145	10	13	1	648	57

=== International ===
Croatia
Year	Apps	Goals
2002	1	0
2003	11	1
2004	11	4
2005	9	3
2006	9	3
2007	11	4
2008	10	2
2009	9	1
2010	8	1
2011	10	0
2012	10	0
2013	11	2
2014	11	0
2015	6	0
2016	7	1
Total	134	22

Croatia score listed first, score column indicates score after each Srna goal

No.	Date	Venue	Cap	Opponent	Score	Result	Competition
1	29 March 2003	Maksimir Stadium, Zagreb, Croatia	4	Belgium	1–0	4–0	UEFA Euro 2004 qualifying
2	31 March 2004	Maksimir Stadium, Zagreb, Croatia	14	Turkey	2–1	2–2	Friendly
3	8 September 2004	Ullevi Stadium, Gothenburg, Sweden	21	Sweden	1–0	1–0	2006 FIFA World Cup qualification
4	9 October 2004	Maksimir Stadium, Zagreb, Croatia	22	Bulgaria	1–0	2–2	2006 FIFA World Cup qualification
5	9 October 2004	Maksimir Stadium, Zagreb, Croatia	22	Bulgaria	2–0	2–2	2006 FIFA World Cup qualification
6	9 February 2005	Teddy Stadium, Jerusalem, Israel	24	Israel	2–1	3–3	Friendly
7	3 September 2005	Laugardalsvöllur, Reykjavík, Iceland	28	Iceland	3–1	3–1	2006 FIFA World Cup qualification
8	8 October 2005	Maksimir Stadium, Zagreb, Croatia	30	Sweden	1–0	1–0	2006 FIFA World Cup qualification
9	1 March 2006	St. Jakob-Park, Basel, Switzerland	33	Argentina	2–2	3–2	Friendly
10	22 June 2006	Gottlieb-Daimler-Stadion, Stuttgart, Germany	39	Australia	1–0	2–2	2006 FIFA World Cup
11	15 November 2006	Ramat Gan Stadium, Ramat Gan, Israel	41	Israel	1–1	4–3	UEFA Euro 2008 qualifying
12	24 March 2007	Maksimir Stadium, Zagreb, Croatia	43	Macedonia	1–1	2–1	UEFA Euro 2008 qualifying
13	22 August 2007	Koševo Stadium, Sarajevo, Bosnia and Herzegovina	46	Bosnia and Herzegovina	2–0	5–3	Friendly
14	22 August 2007	Koševo Stadium, Sarajevo, Bosnia and Herzegovina	46	Bosnia and Herzegovina	4–2	5–3	Friendly
15	12 September 2007	Estadi Comunal, Andorra la Vella, Andorra	48	Andorra	1–0	6–0	UEFA Euro 2008 qualifying
16	12 June 2008	Hypo-Arena, Klagenfurt, Austria	57	Germany	1–0	2–1	UEFA Euro 2008
17	20 August 2008	Ljudski vrt, Maribor, Slovenia	59	Slovenia	2–2	3–2	Friendly
18	14 November 2009	Stadion HNK Cibalia, Vinkovci, Croatia	71	Liechtenstein	2–0	5–0	Friendly
19	3 September 2010	Skonto Stadium, Riga, Latvia	76	Latvia	3–0	3–0	UEFA Euro 2012 qualifying
20	6 February 2013	Craven Cottage, London, England	100	South Korea	2–0	4–0	Friendly
21	19 November 2013	Maksimir Stadium, Zagreb, Croatia	110	Iceland	2–0	2–0	2014 FIFA World Cup qualification
22	4 June 2016	Stadion Rujevica, Rijeka, Croatia	130	San Marino	3–0	10–0	Friendly

== Managerial statistics ==
As of 24 October 2023

Managerial record by team and tenure
Team	From	To	Record				
Team	From	To	G	W	D	L	Win %
Shakhtar Donetsk (interim)	17 October 2023	24 October 2023	1	1	0	0	100.00
Career total			1	1	0	0	100.00

== Honours ==
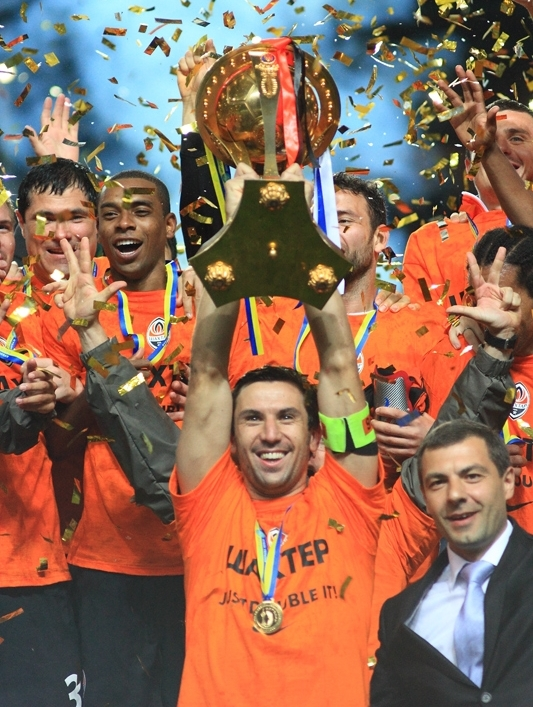
Srna lifting the Ukrainian Cup in 2011

Hajduk Split

- Prva HNL: 2000–01
- Croatian Cup: 1999–2000, 2002–03

Shakhtar Donetsk

- Vyshcha Liha/Ukrainian Premier League: 2004–05, 2005–06, 2007–08, 2009–10, 2010–11, 2011–12, 2012–13, 2013–14, 2016–17, 2017–18
- Ukrainian Cup: 2003–04, 2007–08, 2010–11, 2011–12, 2012–13, 2015–16, 2016–17, 2017–18
- Ukrainian Super Cup: 2005, 2008, 2010, 2012, 2013, 2014, 2015, 2017
- UEFA Cup: 2008–09

Individual

- Heart of Hajduk Award: 2003
- Best Ukrainian Premier League Player: 2008–09, 2009–10
- ADN Eastern European Footballer of the Season: 2009
- UEFA Europa League Squad of the Season: 2015–16

Orders

- Order For Courage by Ukraine: 2009

== See also ==
- List of men's footballers with 100 or more international caps
