= Yaroslav Rakitskyi =

Ukrainian footballer

Yaroslav Rakitskyi Ярослав Ракіцький
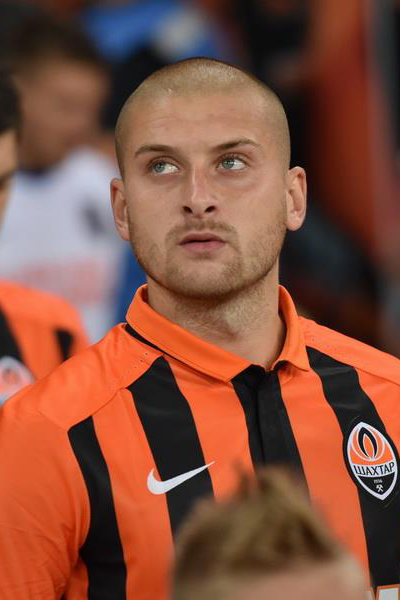
- Rakitskyi with Shakhtar Donetsk in 2016

Personal information
- Full name: Yaroslav Volodymyrovych Rakitskyi
- Date of birth: 3 August 1989 (age 37)
- Place of birth: Pershotravensk, Ukrainian SSR
- Height: 1.80 m (5 ft 11 in)
- Position: Centre-back

Youth career
- 2002: Pavlohrad
- 2003–2004: Shakhtar Donetsk
- 2005: UOR Donetsk
- 2006–2009: Shakhtar Donetsk

Senior career*
| Years | Team | Apps | (Gls) |
| 2006–2008 | Shakhtar-3 Donetsk | 31 | (4) |
| 2009–2018 | Shakhtar Donetsk | 210 | (9) |
| 2019–2022 | Zenit Saint Petersburg | 78 | (5) |
| 2022–2023 | Adana Demirspor | 8 | (0) |
| 2023–2024 | Shakhtar Donetsk | 24 | (1) |
| 2025-2026 | Chornomorets Odesa | 25 | (3) |

International career
| 2009 | Ukraine U20 | 1 | (0) |
| 2008–2011 | Ukraine U21 | 17 | (3) |
| 2009–2019 | Ukraine | 54 | (5) |
- * Club domestic league appearances and goals as of 11 February 2026

Yaroslav Volodymyrovych Rakitskyi (Ukrainian: Яросла́в Володи́мирович Ракі́цький, pronounced [jɐroˈslɑu̯ woloˈdɪmɪrowɪtʃ rɐˈkɪtsʲkɪj]; born 3 August 1989) is a Ukrainian former professional footballer who played as a centre-back. He is best known for his passing ability and free-kicks.

He was also a member of the Ukraine national team, making his international debut on 10 October 2009 and scoring his first goal on 14 October of the same year. Rakitskyi has amassed over 50 caps for Ukraine and represented his country at UEFA Euro 2012 and UEFA Euro 2016.

== Club career ==
=== Shakhtar Donetsk ===
==== 2009–10 season ====
He moved up to the first team during the 2009–10 season, making his debut, at the age of 20, in a 6–1 Ukrainian Cup win against Dnister Ovidiopol (now called FC Odesa). He made his league debut for the club 16 days later, coming as a substitute on 31 August in a 3–1 victory over Zorya Luhansk. His first goal for Shakhtar came in the following round of the Ukrainian Cup in a 3–1 victory over Yednist' Plysky. He also set up the third goal of the match for Oleksandr Gladkiy. Rakytskiy scored his second goal of the season in a 4–1 group stage win over Partizan Belgrade in the Europa League. He ended his first season in the Shakhtar first team with 37 appearances, of which 24 came in the league, and 2 goals. He picked his first trophy at Shakhtar, with the team winning the league.

==== 2010–11 season ====
Rakytskiy started the 2010–11 with success in the Super Cup as Shakhtar comprehensively defeated Tavriya 7–1. His first league goal came in a 3–1 victory over Kryvbas on 10 July 2010. He also scored Shakhtar's only goal in a 6–1 aggregate lose to Barcelona in the Champions League quarter final, scoring in the 5–1 first leg defeat at Camp Nou. He played in Shakhtar's 2–0 Ukrainian Cup win over Dynamo Kyiv. He made a total of 34 appearances in the 2010–11 season, scoring twice as Shakhtar retained the Premier League title.

==== 2011–12 season ====
Shakhtar won the Premier League and the Ukrainian Cup in the 2011–12 season. On 29 October Yaroslav picked up a red card in a 3–2 victory over Oleksandria, after receiving two yellow cards. His first goal of the season came in a 2–0 victory over Dynamo Kyiv at the Donbas Arena on 7 April. He scored another goal a few weeks later in a 3–1 victory over Tavriya. He finished the season with 2 goals in 37 appearances, 27 of which were in the league. Shakhtar won the Premier League title for the third year in a row and also retained the Ukrainian Cup in a 2–1 extra time victory over Metalurh Donetsk. Oleksandr Kucher scored the winning goal, after a rebound from Rakytskiy's shot.

==== 2012–13 season ====
He played in Shakhtar's 2–0 Super Cup victory over Metalurh Donetsk on 10 July, keeping a clean sheet. He managed clean sheets in a 6–0 win against Arsenal Kyiv on 15 July, a 1–0 victory over Kryvbas on 29 July and a 4–0 win over Volyn Lutsk on 6 September. On 26 August he assisted Henrikh Mkhitaryan for the third goal in a 3–0 victory over Karpaty Lviv and kept a clean sheet. and was named Man of the Match. On 15 September he kept a clean sheet in a 3–0 victory against Zorya Luhansk.

==== 2017–18 season ====
He scored in the final as Shakhtar beat rivals Dynamo Kyiv in the 2017–18 Ukrainian Cup final.

=== Zenit Saint Petersburg ===
On 28 January 2019, he signed a 3.5-year contract with Russian Premier League club FC Zenit Saint Petersburg. Some Ukrainians have derided Rakitskyi as a "traitor" for moving to the Russian league, as Zenit are based in Russia and the war in Donbas was ongoing, despite the fact that Anatoliy Tymoshchuk, another famous Ukrainian footballer, is also working as assistant manager for Zenit. His move to Russia during the war led to him being stopped from being called up to the national team, which led to his official retirement from international football. He became a starting player for Zenit, and a favourite of the fans, who made positive songs about him. He also became one of the leaders of the Russian league in accuracy of passes. At the end of the 2019–20 season, he was voted by the league players as the 8th best player in the league, and number one in his position. For his time in Zenit, Rakitskyi was praised for his versatility in the defence and for his help to the attack.

On 24 February 2022, Rakitskyi was dropped from Zenit's line-up to play Real Betis in the Europa League knockout round play-offs following a social media post that spoke out against the Russian invasion of Ukraine that started that very day. On 2 March 2022, Rakitskyi left Zenit by mutual consent.

=== Adana Demirspor ===
On 23 July 2022, Rakitskyi joined Adana Demirspor on a one-year deal, plus an optional year.

=== Return to Shakhtar Donetsk ===
On 16 January 2023 Rakitskyi rejoined Shakhtar Donetsk on a deal that lasted to the end of the season. He joined the club as a free agent. In the spring of 2022 Rakitskyi had already played in Shakhtar Donetsk charity matches during Shakhtar's "Global Tour for Peace". On 30 June 2024, Shakhtar announced that Rakitskyi had left the club at the end of his contract.

=== Chornomorets Odesa ===
On 28 March 2025, Rakitskyi joined Ukrainian Premier League side Chornomorets Odesa. As a player for Chornomorets, he made his debut against Karpaty Lviv on 30 March 2025. On 10 August 2025 in the 2nd round match of the Ukrainian First League 2025–26 between Podillya Khmelnytskyi and Chornomorets Rakitskyi scored his first goal as a player of Chornomorets. On 11 February 2026, FC Chornomorets and Rakitskiy agreed to end their cooperation.

== International career ==
Rakitskyi made his debut for the national team on 10 October 2009, at the age of 20, in a 1–0 victory over England in a World Cup qualifier. His first goal for Ukraine came just four days later and a 6–0 win against Andorra. He scored his second goal in a 2–1 friendly win over Chile on 7 September 2010 and scored his third goal in another friendly match, a 2–2 draw with Romania which saw Ukraine take victory 4–2 in a penalty shootout and the finals of this tournament came out (Cyprus International Football Tournaments 2011.

Since the start of the war in Donbas, Rakitskyi faced repeated questioning in the press about his refusal to sing the Ukrainian national anthem when he played for Ukraine. He has not been called up to the national team since his transfer to Zenit Saint Petersburg.

The popular opinion was that he stopped being called up to the national team due to political reasons, when some commented how not calling him up was unprofessional, while others accused Rakitskyi of "putting himself before the interests of the national team" by moving to Russia.

Rakitskyi subsequently retired from the national team in 2019.

== Career statistics ==
=== Club ===
As of match played 29 November 2025

Appearances and goals by club, season and competition
| Club | Season | League | | | National Cup | | Europe | | Other | | Total | |
| Club | Season | Division | Apps | Goals | Apps | Goals | Apps | Goals | Apps | Goals | Apps | Goals |
|---|---|---|---|---|---|---|---|---|---|---|---|---|
| Shakhtar Donetsk | 2009–10 | Ukrainian Premier League | 24 | 0 | 4 | 1 | 9 (Note: Appearances in the UEFA Europa League) | 1 | 0 | 0 | 37 | 2 |
| Shakhtar Donetsk | 2010–11 | Ukrainian Premier League | 21 | 1 | 2 | 0 | 10 (Note: Appearances in the UEFA Champions League) | 1 | 1 (Note: Appearance in the Ukrainian Super Cup) | 0 | 34 | 2 |
| Shakhtar Donetsk | 2011–12 | Ukrainian Premier League | 27 | 2 | 5 | 0 | 4 | 0 | 1 | 0 | 37 | 2 |
| Shakhtar Donetsk | 2012–13 | Ukrainian Premier League | 24 | 1 | 2 | 0 | 8 | 0 | 1 | 0 | 35 | 1 |
| Shakhtar Donetsk | 2013–14 | Ukrainian Premier League | 23 | 0 | 1 | 0 | 7 (Note: Six appearances in the UEFA Champions League, one appearance in the UEFA Europa League) | 0 | 1 | 0 | 32 | 0 |
| Shakhtar Donetsk | 2014–15 | Ukrainian Premier League | 18 | 2 | 5 | 0 | 8 | 0 | 1 | 0 | 2 | 2 |
| Shakhtar Donetsk | 2015–16 | Ukrainian Premier League | 18 | 2 | 2 | 0 | 17 (Note: Ten appearances in the UEFA Champions League, seven appearances and one goal in the UEFA Europa League) | 1 | 1 | 0 | 38 | 3 |
| Shakhtar Donetsk | 2016–17 | Ukrainian Premier League | 21 | 0 | 2 | 0 | 8 (Note: One appearance in the UEFA Champions League, seven appearances in the UEFA Europa League) | 0 | 0 | 0 | 31 | 0 |
| Shakhtar Donetsk | 2017–18 | Ukrainian Premier League | 23 | 0 | 3 | 1 | 7 | 0 | 1 | 0 | 34 | 1 |
| Shakhtar Donetsk | 2018–19 | Ukrainian Premier League | 11 | 1 | 0 | 0 | 4 | 0 | 1 | 0 | 16 | 1 |
| Shakhtar Donetsk | Total | | 210 | 9 | 26 | 2 | 82 | 3 | 8 | 0 | 326 | 14 |
| Zenit Saint Petersburg | 2018–19 | Russian Premier League | 12 | 3 | 0 | 0 | 4 | 0 | 0 | 0 | 16 | 3 |
| Zenit Saint Petersburg | 2019–20 | Russian Premier League | 27 | 0 | 4 | 0 | 5 | 1 | 1 (Note: Appearance in the Russian Super Cup) | 0 | 37 | 1 |
| Zenit Saint Petersburg | 2020–21 | Russian Premier League | 24 | 1 | 1 | 0 | 6 | 0 | 1 | 0 | 32 | 1 |
| Zenit Saint Petersburg | 2021–22 | Russian Premier League | 15 | 1 | 0 | 0 | 7 (Note: Six appearances in the UEFA Champions League, one appearance in the UEFA Europa League) | 1 | 1 | 0 | 23 | 2 |
| Zenit Saint Petersburg | Total | | 78 | 5 | 5 | 0 | 22 | 2 | 3 | 0 | 108 | 7 |
| Adana Demirspor | 2022–23 | Süper Lig | 8 | 0 | 1 | 0 | 4 | 0 | 0 | 0 | 9 | 0 |
| Shakhtar Donetsk | 2022–23 | Ukrainian Premier League | 13 | 1 | 0 | 0 | 1 | 1 | 0 | 0 | 14 | 2 |
| Shakhtar Donetsk | 2023–24 | Ukrainian Premier League | 11 | 0 | 1 | 0 | 6 | 1 | 0 | 0 | 18 | 1 |
| Shakhtar Donetsk | Total | | 24 | 1 | 1 | 0 | 7 | 2 | 0 | 0 | 32 | 3 |
| Chornomorets Odesa | 2024–25 | Ukrainian Premier League | 9 | 0 | 0 | 0 | 0 | 0 | 0 | 0 | 9 | 0 |
| Chornomorets Odesa | 2025–26 | Ukrainian First League | 16 | 3 | 0 | 0 | 0 | 0 | 0 | 0 | 9 | 0 |
| Career total | | | 337 | 18 | 32 | 2 | 104 | 7 | 11 | 0 | 486 | 24 |

=== International ===
As of 20 December 2018

Ukraine
| Year | Apps | Goals |
| 2009 | 4 | 1 |
| 2010 | 4 | 1 |
| 2011 | 5 | 1 |
| 2012 | 7 | 0 |
| 2013 | 6 | 1 |
| 2014 | 3 | 0 |
| 2015 | 9 | 0 |
| 2016 | 6 | 0 |
| 2017 | 4 | 0 |
| 2018 | 6 | 1 |
| Total | 54 | 5 |

Scores and results list Ukraine's goal tally first.

| No | Date | Venue | Opponent | Score | Result | Competition |
|---|---|---|---|---|---|---|
| 1. | 14 October 2009 | Comunal, Andorra la Vella, Andorra | Andorra | 4–0 | 6–0 | 2010 FIFA World Cup qualification |
| 2. | 7 September 2010 | Valeriy Lobanovskyi Dynamo Stadium, Kyiv, Ukraine | Chile | 2–0 | 2–1 | Friendly |
| 3. | 8 February 2011 | Paralimni Stadium, Paralimni, Cyprus | Romania | 1–0 | 2–2 | Cytavision Cyprus Tournament 2011 |
| 4. | 6 September 2013 | Arena Lviv, Lviv, Ukraine | San Marino | 9–0 | 9–0 | 2014 FIFA World Cup qualification |
| 5. | 27 March 2018 | Stade Maurice Dufrasne, Liège, Belgium | Japan | 1–0 | 2–1 | Kirin Challenge Cup |

== Honours ==
Shakhtar Donetsk

- Ukrainian Premier League: 2009–10, 2010–11, 2011–12, 2012–13, 2013–14, 2016–17, 2017–18, 2022–23, 2023–24
- Ukrainian Cup: 2010–11, 2011–12, 2012–13, 2015–16, 2016–17, 2017–18, 2023–24
- Ukrainian Super Cup: 2010, 2012, 2013, 2014, 2015, 2017

Zenit Saint Petersburg

- Russian Premier League: 2018–19, 2019–20, 2020–21, 2021–22
- Russian Cup: 2019–20
- Russian Super Cup: 2020, 2021

Individual awards

- List of 33 Best Football Players of the Year: No. 1 - 2019/20, 2020/21; No. 2 - 2018/19.

== Business outside football ==
In 2024, Rakitskyi and his sister Daria Rakitska founded a sports management and marketing agency, "Dominant Promotion" (LLC Dominant Promotion). The brand was publicly launched in March 2025. Rakitskyi is responsible for player support, while Daria Rakitska serves as Founder & CEO, setting the company's strategic direction. In December 2025, Volodymyr Geninson became a strategic partner in the agency's sports business division.
