= Taras Stepanenko =

Ukrainian footballer

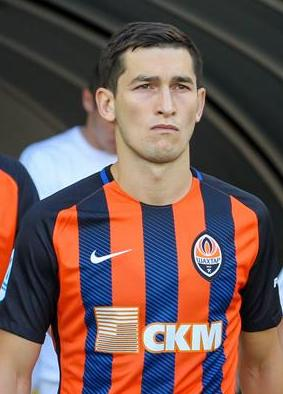
- Stepanenko with Shakhtar Donetsk in 2018

Personal information
- Full name: Taras Mykolaiovych Stepanenko
- Date of birth: 8 August 1989 (age 37)
- Place of birth: Velyka Novosilka, Ukrainian SSR, Soviet Union
- Height: 1.81 m (5 ft 11 in)
- Position: Defensive midfielder

Team information
- Current team: Ukraine (assistant)

Youth career
- 2001–2003: Torpedo-Kosmos Zaporizhzhia
- 2003: Arsenal Kharkiv
- 2003–2004: Torpedo Zaporizhzhia
- 2004–2006: Kosmos Zaporizhzhia

Senior career*
Years	Team	Apps	(Gls)
2006	Metalurh-2 Zaporizhzhia	16	(1)
2007–2010	Metalurh Zaporizhzhia	81	(1)
2010–2025	Shakhtar Donetsk	289	(22)
2025–2026	Eyüpspor	14	(0)
2026	Kolos Kovalivka	5	(0)

International career
2008	Ukraine U19	4	(0)
2007–2011	Ukraine U21	27	(1)
2010–2024	Ukraine	87	(4)

Managerial career
- 2026–: Ukraine (assistant)
- * Club domestic league appearances and goals

Taras Mykolaiovych Stepanenko (Ukrainian: Тара́с Микола́йович Степане́нко; born 8 August 1989) is a Ukrainian football coach and former player who played as a Defensive midfielder. He is currently an assistant coach for Ukraine national team.

Stepanenko started his career at Metalurh Zaporizhzhia, making his debut in 2007, before joining Shakhtar in 2010.

== Club career ==
=== Metalurh Zaporizhzhia ===
Taras began his career with Metalurh Zaporizhzhia, playing for the junior team 16 times, scoring 1 goal, in the 2006–07 season, before being promoted to the senior team for the rest of the season.

He made his debut for the senior team on 4 March 2007 at the age of 17 in a 3–1 defeat to Dynamo Kyiv. He ended his first season in the senior side with 12 appearances.

In his second season he scored his first goal for the club on 21 July 2007 in a 1–0 Premier League victory over Kryvbas. He was just one month shy of his 18th birthday when he netted the goal. He went on to make 23 appearances for the club in that season, with 1 goal.

His third season saw him become an integral part of the team as he made 29 appearances for the club.

The following season he played 17 matches for the club. At the end of the season he agreed a deal to join reigning Premier League champions Shakhtar Donetsk. He made a total of 81 appearances for Metalurh's first team, scoring 1 goal.

=== Shakhtar Donetsk ===
==== 2010–11 ====
On 11 May 2010 the midfielder signed a five-year deal with Shakhtar Donetsk for an undisclosed, leaving Metalurh Zaporizhzhia with Serhiy Kryvtsov who also joined Shakhtar in a five-year deal. He made his debut for the club in a 7–1 Super Cup victory over Tavriya Simferopol, coming on as a substitute. This was his first trophy with the club. He scored his first goal for the club on 23 November 2010 in a 3–0 Champions League group stage victory over Partizan Belgrade. He made 20 appearances for Shakhtar in his first season, including 15 league appearances, scoring 1 goal. He helped Shakhtar to a treble, winning the Premier League, Super Cup and the Cup.

==== 2011–12 ====
In his second season with the club he made 12 appearances, 9 in the league and 3 in the cup. He came on in the 109th minute of Shakhtar's 2–1 extra time victory over Metalurh Donetsk in the Ukrainian Cup Final. Shakhtar also secured another Premier League title.

==== 2012–13 ====
He played the full 90 minutes of Shakhtar's 2–0 Super Cup victory over Metalurh Donetsk, picking up a yellow card in the 60th minute. On 6 August 2012, he assisted Henrikh Mkhitaryan for the second goal in a 4–0 Premier League victory over Volyn Lutsk. He assisted Oleksandr Kucher for the first goal in a 3–1 victory over FC Dynamo Kyiv on 2 September. On 28 September he picked up a red card in the 89th minute after receiving a second yellow card in a match against Dnipro Dnipropetrovsk, however it did not affect Shakhtar as they won the match 2–1. On 19 October he assisted Dmytro Chyhrynskyi for the winning goal in a 2–1 victory against Illichivets Mariupol.

==== Rivalry with Yarmolenko ====
In a match in October 2015 Andriy Yarmolenko committed a dangerous challenge which almost broke Stepanenko's leg. The two made up after the game and exchanged jerseys, but afterwards Yarmolenko threw Stepanenko's shirt on the ground while he thanked the Dynamo Kyiv fans. In the Shakhtar-Dynamo derby in April 2016 after the former won 3–0 Stepanenko went in front of the Dynamo fans kissing his badge. In a brawl that escalated Yarmolenko kicked and beat Stepanenko to the ground. After the brawl, three red cards were shown; a straight red card to Yarmolenko and Oleksandr Kucher, and a second yellow to Stepanenko.

==== 2023–24 ====
On 26 September 2023, Stepanenko made his 400th appearance for Shakhtar Donetsk in their Ukrainian Cup Round of 16 game against Veres Rivne.

On 20 January 2024, Stepanenko extended his contract with Shakhtar Donetsk until the summer of 2025.

=== Kolos Kovalivka ===
On 1 March 2026, Stepanenko joined Kolos Kovalivka.

=== Retirement ===
On 21 May 2026, Stepanenko announced his retirement from professional football and joined the Ukraine national football team as an assistant coach.

== International career ==
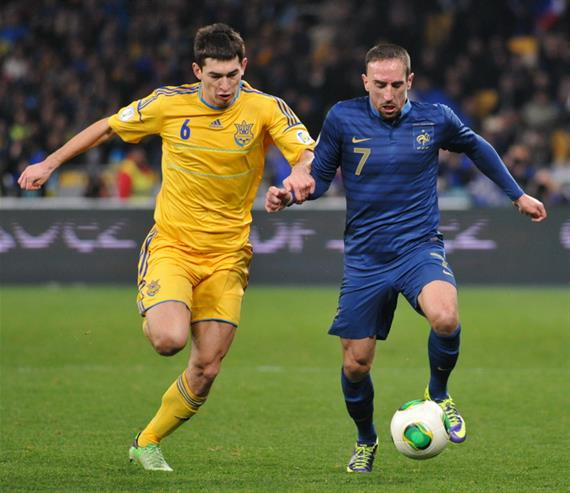
Stepanenko battling for the ball with Franck Ribéry

He was the captain of Ukraine national under-21 football team. He has appeared for Ukraine's under-19 team four times, the under-21 team on 22 occasions, scoring one goal, and the senior team five times. On 17 November 2010, he made his debut for the senior side in the 2:2 draw with Switzerland in a friendly match, coming on as a 65th-minute substitute for Taras Mykhalyk. His first start came on 8 February 2011 in a 2–2 draw against Romania. He made another appearance the following day in a 1–1 draw with Sweden. He played in a 2–0 defeat to Italy on 29 March 2011. On 15 August 2012, he came on as a 72nd-minute substitute for Shakhtar Donetsk teammate Marko Dević in a 0–0 draw with Czech Republic. On 26 March 2013, Stepanenko received red card for high kick on Vitaliy Bordiyan in a World Cup qualification match against Moldova.

Stepanenko was included in Ukraine's squad for the UEFA Euro 2016, making three appearances as Ukraine finished bottom of the group with no points.

== Personal life ==
Taras Stepanenko spoke against the tattoo culture among football players and cited his Christian beliefs as the reason. He is also an avid reader, his favourite genre being biographies of great men.

== Career statistics ==
=== Club ===
Appearances and goals by club, season and competition
Club	Season	League			Cup		Europe		Other		Total	
Club	Season	Division	Apps	Goals	Apps	Goals	Apps	Goals	Apps	Goals	Apps	Goals
Metalurh Zaporizhzhia	2006–07	Ukrainian Premier League	12	0	0	0	0	0	0	0	12	0
Metalurh Zaporizhzhia	2007–08	Ukrainian Premier League	23	1	1	0	0	0	0	0	24	1
Metalurh Zaporizhzhia	2008–09	Ukrainian Premier League	29	0	1	0	0	0	0	0	30	0
Metalurh Zaporizhzhia	2009–10	Ukrainian Premier League	17	0	0	0	0	0	0	0	17	0
Metalurh Zaporizhzhia	Total		81	1	2	0	0	0	0	0	83	1
Shakhtar Donetsk	2010–11	Ukrainian Premier League	15	0	2	0	2 (Note: Appearances in UEFA Champions League)	1	1	0	20	1
Shakhtar Donetsk	2011–12	Ukrainian Premier League	9	0	3	0	0	0	0	0	12	0
Shakhtar Donetsk	2012–13	Ukrainian Premier League	18	0	3	0	3	0	1	0	25	0
Shakhtar Donetsk	2013–14	Ukrainian Premier League	18	2	4	0	4 (Note: Three appearances in UEFA Champions League, one appearance in UEFA Europa League)	0	1	0	27	2
Shakhtar Donetsk	2014–15	Ukrainian Premier League	22	4	5	0	7	1	1	0	35	5
Shakhtar Donetsk	2015–16	Ukrainian Premier League	18	2	5	0	16 (Note: Nine appearances in UEFA Champions League, seven appearances in UEFA Europa League)	1	1	0	40	3
Shakhtar Donetsk	2016–17	Ukrainian Premier League	27	1	3	1	10 (Note: Two appearances in UEFA Champions League, eight appearances in UEFA Europa League)	2	1	0	41	4
Shakhtar Donetsk	2017–18	Ukrainian Premier League	26	0	3	0	8	0	1	0	38	0
Shakhtar Donetsk	2018–19	Ukrainian Premier League	26	4	2	0	7 (Note: Six appearances in UEFA Champions League, one appearance in UEFA Europa League)	0	1	0	36	4
Shakhtar Donetsk	2019–20	Ukrainian Premier League	24	1	1	1	11 (Note: Six appearances in UEFA Champions League, five appearances in UEFA Europa League)	1	1	0	37	3
Shakhtar Donetsk	2020–21	Ukrainian Premier League	18	2	0	0	5 (Note: Four appearances in UEFA Champions League, one appearance in UEFA Europa League)	0	1	0	24	2
Shakhtar Donetsk	2021–22	Ukrainian Premier League	13	2	0	0	8	0	1	0	22	2
Shakhtar Donetsk	2022–23	Ukrainian Premier League	26	3	0	0	10 (Note: Six appearances in UEFA Champions League, four appearances in UEFA Europa League)	0	0	0	36	3
Shakhtar Donetsk	2023–24	Ukrainian Premier League	20	0	3	0	8 (Note: Six appearances in UEFA Champions League, two appearances in UEFA Europa League)	0	0	0	31	0
Shakhtar Donetsk	2024–25	Ukrainian Premier League	9	1	1	0	6	0	0	0	16	1
Shakhtar Donetsk	Total		289	22	35	2	105	6	11	0	440	30
Eyüpspor	2024–25	Süper Lig	7	0	2	0	—		—		9	0
Career total			377	23	39	2	105	6	11	0	531	31

=== International ===
Appearances and goals by national team and year
National team	Year	Apps	Goals
Ukraine	2010	1	0
Ukraine	2011	3	0
Ukraine	2012	2	0
Ukraine	2013	7	0
Ukraine	2014	5	1
Ukraine	2015	7	0
Ukraine	2016	11	2
Ukraine	2017	7	0
Ukraine	2018	8	0
Ukraine	2019	6	0
Ukraine	2020	2	0
Ukraine	2021	10	1
Ukraine	2022	4	0
Ukraine	2023	8	0
Ukraine	2024	6	0
Total		87	4

Scores and results list Ukraine's goal tally first, score column indicates score after each Stepanenko goal.

List of international goals scored by Taras Stepanenko
No.	Date	Venue	Opponent	Score	Result	Competition
1	22 May 2014	V. Lobanovskyi Stadium, Kyiv, Ukraine	Niger	2–1	2–1	Friendly
2	24 March 2016	Chornomorets Stadium, Odesa, Ukraine	Cyprus	1–0	1–0	Friendly
3	3 June 2016	Stadio Atleti Azzurri d'Italia, Bergamo, Italy	Albania	1–0	3–1	Friendly
4	11 November 2021	Chornomorets Stadium, Odesa, Ukraine	Bulgaria	1–1	1–1	Friendly

== Honours ==
Shakhtar Donetsk

- Ukrainian Premier League (11): 2010–11, 2011–12, 2012–13, 2013–14, 2016–17, 2017–18, 2018–19, 2019–20, 2021–22, 2022–23, 2023–24
- Ukrainian Cup (8): 2010–11, 2011–12, 2012–13, 2015–16, 2016–17, 2017–18, 2018–19, 2023–24
- Ukrainian Super Cup (7): 2010, 2012, 2013, 2014, 2015, 2017, 2021
