= Oleksandr Kucher =

Ukrainian footballer and manager

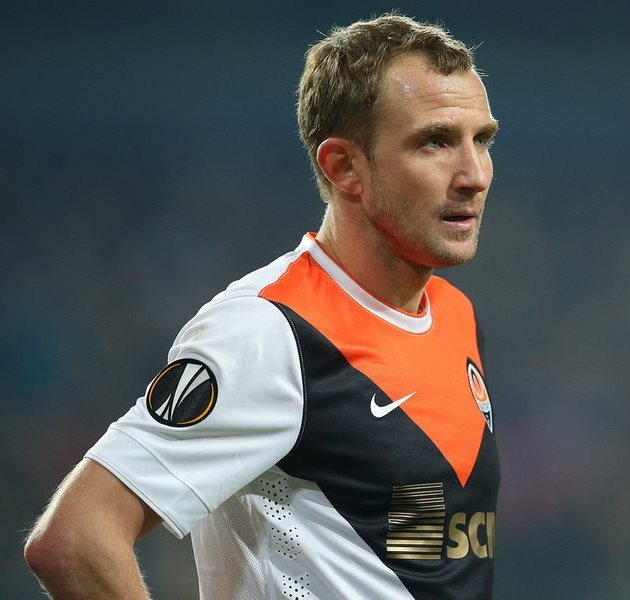
- Kucher with Shakhtar Donetsk in 2016

Personal information
- Full name: Oleksandr Mykolayovych Kucher
- Date of birth: 22 October 1982 (age 44)
- Place of birth: Kyiv, Ukrainian SSR, Soviet Union
- Height: 1.84 m (6 ft 0 in)
- Position: Defender

Youth career
- Atlet Kyiv
- 1999: SDYuShOR-19 Kyiv
- 1999–2000: Dynamo Kyiv

Senior career*
Years	Team	Apps	(Gls)
2000–2002	Arsenal Kharkiv	59	(5)
2002–2005	Metalurh Donetsk	9	(0)
2002	→ Arsenal Kharkiv (loan)	14	(0)
2003–2004	→ Metalurh-2 Donetsk	10	(0)
2003–2004	→ Banants Yerevan (loan)	19	(3)
2004–2005	→ Arsenal Kharkiv (loan)	12	(0)
2005–2006	Metalist Kharkiv	28	(2)
2006–2017	Shakhtar Donetsk	167	(7)
2017–2019	Kayserispor	42	(0)
2019	Karpaty Lviv	4	(0)
2020	Metal Kharkiv	0	(0)
Total		364	(17)

International career
2006–2017	Ukraine	57	(2)

Managerial career
- 2020–2022: Metalist Kharkiv
- 2022–2023: Dnipro-1
- 2025: Chornomorets Odesa
- * Club domestic league appearances and goals

Oleksandr Mykolayovych Kucher (Ukrainian: Олександр Миколайович Кучер; born 22 October 1982) is a Ukrainian former professional footballer and current football manager. He was a powerful defender who was good in the air and provided good coverage in the back. He could also play as a defensive midfielder.

A Shakhtar Donetsk player from 2006 until 2017, he won many honours including Premier League titles and the 2008–09 UEFA Cup. He made his senior international debut in 2006 and represented Ukraine when they co-hosted UEFA Euro 2012.

== Club career ==
Kucher is a product of several Kyiv city sports schools and football academies, including the "Atlet" sports school and the Dynamo football academy. He began his career, however, away from Kyiv playing for Arsenal Kharkiv, where he participated in 59 third-tier league matches and scored 5 goals. He joined the Ukrainian top league member Metalurh Donetsk in 2002. While being a player of Metalurh Donetsk, Kucher spent a season on loan at Arsenal Kharkiv during the 2002–03 season, a season at Armenian side Banants Yerevan during the 2003–04 season and another spell with Arsenal in the 2004–05 season. He made 26 appearances for Arsenal over his two seasons on loan. He scored 3 goals in 19 appearances for Banants. Having made 9 appearances for Metalurh, Kucher moved to Metalist Kharkiv during the 2005–06 season playing 28 matches with his only two goals coming in 5–2 defeat to Chornomorets Odesa. Oleksandr joined Shakhtar Donetsk in the 2006–07 season. He made his debut for Shakhtar as a substitute in a 5–0 victory over his former club Metalist. He scored in a 4–1 victory over Metalurh Donetsk on 9 August 2009. He netted an extra time winner in the final of the 2011–12 Ukrainian Cup. Kucher scored a brace in a 3–1 victory over Dynamo Kyiv on 4 September 2012 in a man of the match performance.

On 11 March 2015, he was given the quickest red card in the history of the Champions League when he was sent off for foul on Thomas Müller in the third minute of a last 16 second leg against Bayern Munich which Bayern won 7–0.

== International career ==
Kucher made his debut for the Ukraine national team on 15 August 2006 in a 6–0 friendly victory over Azerbaijan. He scored his first goal for Ukraine on 11 October 2006 in a 2–0 Euro 2008 qualifying match victory over Scotland. He was part of Ukraine's squad as they co-hosted UEFA Euro 2012 with Poland, but did not feature in the group stage exit. Four years later, Kucher was again part of his country's 23-man roster to participate in the UEFA Euro 2016. This time, he made one appearance for Ukraine, in a 1–0 loss to Poland, as Ukraine was once again eliminated at the group stage.

== Coaching career ==
=== Metalist Kharkiv ===
He ended his playing career in March 2020. Subsequently, in July 2020, Kucher was appointed to the position of head coach of the newly formed FC Metal, which was renamed FC Metalist in June of the following year.

=== Dnipro-1 ===
In July 2022, he became the head coach of Dnipro-1. Kucher moved to the Dnipro-1 from Metalist Kharkiv together with his assistant Yuriy Ushmaev, the vice-president of the Kharkiv club Yevhen Krasnikov, the club's sports director Papa Gueye, the selectionist Jader da Silva and six players — Vladyslav Rybak, Volodymyr Tanchyk, Serhiy Horbunov, Eduard Sarapiy, Ruslan Babenko and team captain Farès Bahlouli.

=== Chornomorets Odesa ===
On 24 March 2025, Ukrainian Premier League club Chornomorets Odesa announced they had appointed Kucher as new head coach. He made his debut against Karpaty Lviv on 30 March 2025. On 13 January 2026, Kucher has been fired.

== Career statistics ==
=== Club ===
Appearances and goals by club, season and competition
Club	Season	League			National cup (Note: Includes Ukrainian Cup, Turkish Cup)		Europe		Other		Total	
Club	Season	Division	Apps	Goals	Apps	Goals	Apps	Goals	Apps	Goals	Apps	Goals
Shakhtar Donetsk	2006–07	Vyshcha Liha	14	0	4	1	5	0	–		23	1
Shakhtar Donetsk	2007–08	Vyshcha Liha	21	1	4	0	8	0	–		33	1
Shakhtar Donetsk	2008–09	Ukrainian Premier League	15	0	2	0	11	0	1 (Note: Appearance in Ukrainian Super Cup)	0	29	0
Shakhtar Donetsk	2009–10	Ukrainian Premier League	14	1	1	0	10	0	1 (Note: Appearance in UEFA Super Cup)	0	26	1
Shakhtar Donetsk	2010–11	Ukrainian Premier League	10	0	5	0	3	0	–		18	0
Shakhtar Donetsk	2011–12	Ukrainian Premier League	21	0	4	1	6	0	1	0	32	1
Shakhtar Donetsk	2012–13	Ukrainian Premier League	15	3	4	0	7	0	1	0	27	3
Shakhtar Donetsk	2013–14	Ukrainian Premier League	13	1	4	0	8	0	1	0	26	1
Shakhtar Donetsk	2014–15	Ukrainian Premier League	11	0	6	1	6	0	1	0	24	1
Shakhtar Donetsk	2015–16	Ukrainian Premier League	11	1	3	1	13	1	1	0	28	3
Shakhtar Donetsk	2016–17	Ukrainian Premier League	22	0	1	0	6	0	0	0	29	0
Shakhtar Donetsk	Total		167	7	38	4	83	1	7	0	295	12
Kayserispor	2017–18	Süper Lig	21	0	5	0	–		–		26	0
Kayserispor	2018–19	Süper Lig	19	0	5	1	–		–		24	1
Kayserispor	Total		40	0	10	1	–		–		50	1
Career total			207	7	48	5	83	1	7	0	345	13

=== International ===
Appearances and goals by national team and year
National team	Year	Apps	Goals
Ukraine	2006	2	1
Ukraine	2007	5	0
Ukraine	2008	4	0
Ukraine	2009	8	0
Ukraine	2010	2	0
Ukraine	2011	7	0
Ukraine	2012	3	1
Ukraine	2013	6	0
Ukraine	2014	6	0
Ukraine	2015	4	0
Ukraine	2016	8	0
Ukraine	2017	2	0
Total		57	2

Scores and results list Ukraine's goal tally first, score column indicates score after each Kucher goal.

List of international goals scored by Oleksandr Kucher
No.	Date	Venue	Opponent	Score	Result	Competition
1	11 October 2006	Olimpiyskyi National Sports Complex, Kyiv, Ukraine	Scotland	1–0	2–0	Euro 2008 qualifying
2	13 November 2012	Vasil Levski National Stadium, Sofia, Bulgaria	Bulgaria	1–0	1–0	Friendly

=== Managerial ===
As of match played 29 November 2025

Managerial record by team and tenure
Team	Nat	From	To	Record							
Team	Nat	From	To	G	W	D	L	GF	GA	GD	Win %
Metalist Kharkiv	(Ukraine)	30 July 2020	12 July 2022	49	43	4	2	132	19	+113	87.76
Dnipro-1	(Ukraine)	29 July 2022	20 August 2023	48	25	10	13	83	55	+28	52.08
Chornomorets Odesa	(Ukraine)	24 March 2025	25 December 2025	27	13	7	7	33	25	+8	48.15
Career total				124	81	21	22	248	99	+149	65.32

== Honours ==
Shakhtar Donetsk

- Vyshcha Liha/Ukrainian Premier League: 2007–08, 2009–10, 2010–11, 2011–12, 2012–13, 2013–14, 2016–17
- Ukrainian Cup: 2007–08, 2010–11, 2011–12, 2012–13, 2015–16, 2016–17
- Ukrainian Super Cup: 2008, 2010, 2012, 2013, 2014, 2015
- UEFA Cup: 2008–09

Individual

- Ukrainian Premier League Best Coach of the Round : 2022-23 Round 2,
