= Vyacheslav Shevchuk =

Ukrainian footballer and manager

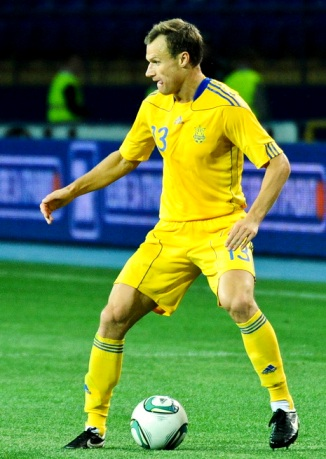
- Shevchuk with Ukraine in 2011

Personal information
- Full name: Vyacheslav Anatoliyovych Shevchuk
- Date of birth: 13 May 1979 (age 47)
- Place of birth: Lutsk, Ukrainian SSR, USSR
- Height: 1.84 m (6 ft 1/2 in)
- Position: Left-back

Team information
- Current team: Polissya Zhytomyr (sporting director)

Youth career
- 1986–1988: Volyn Lutsk
- 1988–1990: Zenit Saint Petersburg
- 1990–1993: Torpedo Moscow
- 1993–1996: Podillya Khmelnytskyi

Senior career*
| Years | Team | Apps | (Gls) |
| 1996 | Kovel-Volyn Kovel | 2 | (0) |
| 1996–1997 | Podillya Khmelnytskyi | 36 | (0) |
| 1998–2000 | Metalurh Zaporizhzhia | 31 | (1) |
| 1999 | → Metalurh-2 Zaporizhzhia | 6 | (0) |
| 2000–2001 | Shakhtar Donetsk | 12 | (0) |
| 2000 | → Shakhtar-3 Donetsk | 1 | (0) |
| 2001 | → Shakhtar-2 Donetsk | 13 | (0) |
| 2002 | Metalurh Donetsk | 2 | (0) |
| 2002 | → Metalurh-2 Donetsk | 6 | (0) |
| 2002–2004 | Shinnik Yaroslavl | 50 | (4) |
| 2005 | Dnipro Dnipropetrovsk | 11 | (1) |
| 2005–2016 | Shakhtar Donetsk | 162 | (4) |
| Total | | 332 | (10) |

International career
| 2003–2016 | Ukraine | 56 | (0) |

Managerial career
- 2017–2018: Shakhtar Donetsk (U17)
- 2018–2019: Olimpik Donetsk
- 2021–2023: Veres Rivne (sporting director)
- 2022: Ukraine U19 (assistant)
- 2023: Veres Rivne (vice-president)
- 2024: Rukh Lviv (general manager)
- 2024–2025: Ukraine U21 (assistant)
- 2025–: Polissya Zhytomyr (sporting director)
- * Club domestic league appearances and goals

Vyacheslav Anatoliyovych Shevchuk (Ukrainian: В'ячеслав Анатолійович Шевчу́к, born 13 May 1979) is a Ukrainian football manager and former left-back.

== Career ==
Having played in the youth system of several Russian clubs before turning professional, Shevchuk spent most of his career playing for Shakhtar Donetsk. In a 2–0 win over Kryvbas Kryvyi Rih on 7 August 2011, Shevchuk scored his first goal for the club.

To date, Shevchuk has won seven Ukrainian Premier League titles, four Ukrainian Cup finals and the UEFA Cup.

In December 2016, Shevchuk announced his retirement from football.

In September 2017, he began his coaching career, leading the Shakhtar U-17 team and received a UEFA Pro coaching diploma.

Since October 2018, he headed the Premier League FC Olimpik Donetsk. On 17 April 2019 Shevchuk left the post of head coach of FC Olimpik Donetsk.

On 23 November 2021 Shevchuk was appointed as sporting director of Veres Rivne.

== Career statistics ==
=== Club ===
As of 28 December 2016

| Club | Season | League | | Cup | | Europe | | Super Cup | | Total | |
| Club | Season | Apps | Goals | Apps | Goals | Apps | Goals | Apps | Goals | Apps | Goals |
|---|---|---|---|---|---|---|---|---|---|---|---|
| Podillya Khmelnytskyi | 1996–97 | 20 | 0 | - | - | - | - | - | - | 20 | 0 |
| Podillya Khmelnytskyi | 1997–98 | 16 | 0 | - | - | - | - | - | - | 16 | 0 |
| Metalurh Zaporizhzhia | 1997–98 | 5 | 0 | - | - | - | - | - | - | 5 | 0 |
| Metalurh Zaporizhzhia | 1998–99 | 5 | 0 | - | - | - | - | - | - | 5 | 0 |
| Metalurh Zaporizhzhia | 1999–00 | 21 | 1 | 3 | 0 | - | - | - | - | 24 | 1 |
| Shakhtar Donetsk | 2000–01 | 11 | 0 | 4 | 0 | 7 | 0 | - | - | 22 | 0 |
| Shakhtar Donetsk | 2001–02 | 1 | 0 | 1 | 0 | - | - | - | - | 2 | 0 |
| Metalurh Donetsk | 2001–02 | 2 | 0 | - | - | - | - | - | - | 2 | 0 |
| Shinnik Yaroslavl | 2002 | 8 | 2 | 1 | 0 | - | - | - | - | 9 | 2 |
| Shinnik Yaroslavl | 2003 | 23 | 1 | 7 | 0 | - | - | - | - | 30 | 1 |
| Shinnik Yaroslavl | 2004 | 19 | 1 | 1 | 0 | 2 | 0 | - | - | 22 | 1 |
| Dnipro Dnipropetrovsk | 2004–05 | 11 | 1 | 2 | 0 | 2 | 0 | - | - | 15 | 1 |
| Shakhtar Donetsk | 2005–06 | 20 | 0 | 3 | 0 | - | - | 1 | 0 | 24 | 0 |
| Shakhtar Donetsk | 2006–07 | 14 | 0 | 4 | 0 | 4 | 0 | 1 | 0 | 23 | 0 |
| Shakhtar Donetsk | 2007–08 | 12 | 0 | 3 | 0 | - | - | - | - | 15 | 0 |
| Shakhtar Donetsk | 2008–09 | 14 | 0 | 2 | 0 | 4 | 0 | - | - | 20 | 0 |
| Shakhtar Donetsk | 2009–10 | 6 | 0 | 1 | 0 | 1 | 0 | - | - | 8 | 0 |
| Shakhtar Donetsk | 2010–11 | 10 | 0 | 5 | 0 | 1 | 0 | - | - | 16 | 0 |
| Shakhtar Donetsk | 2011–12 | 18 | 3 | 2 | 0 | 2 | 0 | 1 | 0 | 23 | 3 |
| Shakhtar Donetsk | 2012–13 | 14 | 0 | 4 | 0 | - | - | - | - | 18 | 0 |
| Shakhtar Donetsk | 2013–14 | 17 | 0 | 2 | 0 | 7 | 0 | 1 | 0 | 27 | 0 |
| Shakhtar Donetsk | 2014–15 | 16 | 1 | 4 | 0 | 6 | 0 | 1 | 0 | 27 | 1 |
| Shakhtar Donetsk | 2015–16 | 9 | 0 | 2 | 0 | 3 | 0 | 0 | 0 | 14 | 0 |
| Total for Podillya Khmelnytskyi | | 36 | 0 | 0 | 0 | 0 | 0 | 0 | 0 | 36 | 0 |
| Total for Metalurh Zaporizhzhia | | 31 | 1 | 3 | 0 | 0 | 0 | 0 | 0 | 34 | 1 |
| Total for Metalurh Donetsk | | 2 | 0 | 0 | 0 | 0 | 0 | 0 | 0 | 2 | 0 |
| Total for Shinnik Yaroslavl | | 50 | 4 | 9 | 0 | 2 | 0 | 0 | 0 | 61 | 4 |
| Total for Dnipro Dnipropetrovsk | | 11 | 1 | 2 | 0 | 2 | 0 | 0 | 0 | 15 | 1 |
| Total for Shakhtar Donetsk | | 162 | 4 | 37 | 0 | 35 | 0 | 5 | 0 | 239 | 4 |
| Career totals | | 292 | 10 | 51 | 0 | 39 | 0 | 5 | 0 | 387 | 10 |
