= List of Ukrainian football transfers summer 2008 =

This is a list of Ukrainian football transfers in the summer transfer window 2008 by club. Only transfers of the Premier League, 1st League and 2nd League are included.

== Premier League ==
=== FC Arsenal Kyiv ===
In: Note: Flags indicate national team as defined under FIFA eligibility rules; some limited exceptions apply. Players may hold more than one non-FIFA nationality.

No.	Pos.	Nation	Player
—	DF	ALB	Elvin Beqiri (from FC Metalurh Donetsk)
—	FW	BRA	Antonio Augusto Ferreira Pinto Júnior (from Vasco de Gama)
—	MF	UKR	Yevhenniy Shmakov (on loan from Dynamo Kyiv)
—	DF	UKR	Vitaly Mandzyuk (on loan from Dynamo Kyiv)
—	MF	UKR	Denys Oleynyk (on loan from Dynamo Kyiv)
—	FW	UKR	Serhiy Pivnenko (on loan from Shakhtar)

Out: Note: Flags indicate national team as defined under FIFA eligibility rules; some limited exceptions apply. Players may hold more than one non-FIFA nationality.

No.	Pos.	Nation	Player
10	MF	UKR	Evhen Seleznyov (returned from loan to FC Shakhtar Donetsk)
—	DF	ALB	Elvin Beqiri (to KS Vllaznia Shkodër)
2	FW	UKR	Andriy Kruhliak
12	MF	CRO	Ivica Pirić (to HNK Trogir)
20	FW	UKR	Oleksandr Batal'sky (to FC Dniester Ovidiopol)
23	DF	UKR	Dmytro Parfenov
77	FW	RUS	Aleksandr Danishevsky
—	MF	BRA	Leandro
—	MF	UKR	Yevhenniy Shmakov (returned from loan to Dynamo Kyiv)
30	FW	GEO	Georgi Demetradze (to FK Baku)

=== FC Chornomorets Odesa ===
In: Note: Flags indicate national team as defined under FIFA eligibility rules; some limited exceptions apply. Players may hold more than one non-FIFA nationality.

No.	Pos.	Nation	Player
3	MF	UKR	Victor Mel'nyk (from FC Kryvbas Kryvyi Rih)
8	MF	UKR	Ruslan Hilaziv (end of loan at FC Dniester Ovidiopol)
88	DF	GEO	Kahaber Mzhavanadze (end of loan at FC Dniester Ovidiopol)
10	FW	UKR	Oleksandr Kosyrin (from FC Metalurh Donetsk)
28	MF	UKR	Pavlo Rebenok (on loan from FC Metalist Kharkiv)
15	FW	UKR	Yevhen Lutsenko (from Zorya Luhansk)
71	FW	ARG	Pablo Vitti (from Independiente)
—	MF	RUS	Yuri Mamaev (from Terek Grozny)

Out: Note: Flags indicate national team as defined under FIFA eligibility rules; some limited exceptions apply. Players may hold more than one non-FIFA nationality.

No.	Pos.	Nation	Player
—	FW	SRB	Marko Jovanović (free-agent)
—	DF	CRO	Igor Lozo (free-agent)
—	MF	UKR	Ruslan Valeyev (free-agent)
—	MF	UKR	Andriy Kirlyk (free-agent)
—	MF	UKR	Oleksandr Zotov (to Metalurh Donetsk)
—	MF	UKR	Serhiy Shyschenko (to Metalurh Donetsk)
—	MF	UKR	Volodymyr Priyomov (loan return to FC Shakhtar Donetsk)
—	FW	PER	Jose Carlos Fernandez (to Cercle Brugge)
—	FW	UKR	Rinar Valeyev (on loan to FC Stal Alchevsk)
—	MF	UKR	Serhiy Polytilo (on loan to FC Dniester Ovidiopol)

=== FC Dnipro Dnipropetrovsk ===
In: Note: Flags indicate national team as defined under FIFA eligibility rules; some limited exceptions apply. Players may hold more than one non-FIFA nationality.

No.	Pos.	Nation	Player
44	DF	UKR	Vitaly Lysytsky (returned from loan)
34	DF	UKR	Maksym Pashaiv (returned from loan)
—	MF	UKR	Ruslan Bidnenko (returned from loan)
7	FW	UKR	Oleksiy Byelik (from Shakhtar)
26	MF	UKR	Maksym Kalynychenko (from Spartak)
21	DF	BRA	Eduardo Alcides (from Chealsea)
—	DF	CIV	Igor Lolo (from KRC Genk)

Out: Note: Flags indicate national team as defined under FIFA eligibility rules; some limited exceptions apply. Players may hold more than one non-FIFA nationality.

No.	Pos.	Nation	Player
—	GK	UKR	Artem Kusliy (on loan to FC Kryvbas Kryvyi Rih)
—	FW	UKR	Kostantyn Balabanov (on loan to FC Kryvbas Kryvyi Rih)
—	DF	UKR	Vyacheslav Serdyuk (on loan to FC Kryvbas Kryvyi Rih)
—	MF	CRO	Mladen Bartulović (on loan to FC Kryvbas Kryvyi Rih)
—	DF	BLR	Dmitry Lentsevich (to Bohemians Prague)
—	DF	UKR	Mykola Morozyuk (was on loan to Dynamo Kyiv)
15	DF	UKR	Serhiy Matiukhin (on loan to FC Kryvbas Kryvyi Rih)
21	MF	UKR	Oleksandr Maksymov (on loan to FC Kryvbas Kryvyi Rih)
—	MF	UKR	Ivan Kotenko (on loan to Lviv)
8	FW	BLR	Sergei Kornilenko (to FC Tom Tomsk)
35	MF	UKR	Pavlo Pashaiv (on loan to Kryvbas)

=== FC Dynamo Kyiv ===
In: Note: Flags indicate national team as defined under FIFA eligibility rules; some limited exceptions apply. Players may hold more than one non-FIFA nationality.

No.	Pos.	Nation	Player
—	MF	CRO	Ognjen Vukojević (from Dinamo Zagreb)
—	FW	NGA	Emmanuel Okoduwa (from Germinal Beerschot)
—	FW	NGA	Frank Temile (from Valletta)
—	DF	BRA	Betão (from Santos FC)
23	DF	UKR	Oleksandr Romanchuk (promoted from Dynamo-2)
—	GK	UKR	Stanyslav Bohush (to Dynamo Kyiv)
23	MF	FIN	Roman Eremenko (on 1 year loan from Udinese Calcio)
—	DF	GEO	Malkhaz Asatiani (on loan from Lokomotiv Moscow)

Out: Note: Flags indicate national team as defined under FIFA eligibility rules; some limited exceptions apply. Players may hold more than one non-FIFA nationality.

No.	Pos.	Nation	Player
—	DF	SRB	Marjan Marković (to Red Star Belgrade)
—	DF	SRB	Goran Gavrančić (released)
18	FW	HUN	Balázs Farkas
27	DF	UKR	Vladyslav Vashchuk (to Lviv)
—	DF	UKR	Anatoliy Kitsuta (on loan to Lviv)
—	MF	BRA	Michael (on 6 month loan to Santos FC)
—	MF	TUN	Chakhir Belghazouani (on 1 year loan to RC Strasbourg)
—	MF	UKR	Yevhenniy Shmakov (on loan to Arsenal Kyiv)
29	DF	UKR	Vitaly Mandzyuk (on loan to Arsenal Kyiv)
33	MF	UKR	Denys Oleynyk (on loan to Arsenal Kyiv)
11	FW	UKR	Volodymyr Lysenko (on loan to Arsenal Kyiv)
14	FW	LVA	Māris Verpakovskis (to Celta Vigo)
24	DF	UKR	Vitaliy Fedoriv (on loan to Amkar Perm)

=== FC Illychivets Mariupol ===
In: Note: Flags indicate national team as defined under FIFA eligibility rules; some limited exceptions apply. Players may hold more than one non-FIFA nationality.

No.	Pos.	Nation	Player
37	DF	RUS	Valentin Nefyodov (from Naftovyk)
33	MF	BLR	Pavel Kirilchik (from FC Karpaty Lviv)
8	FW	UKR	Dmytro Vorobey (from Zorya)
18	MF	UKR	Oleksandr Sytnik (from FC Zvezda Irkutsk)
17	MF	BLR	Mykola Kashevsky (from Metalurh Zaporizhzhia)
14	DF	UKR	Artem Savin (from Zorya)
—	DF	UKR	Ihor Chuchman (from Zakarpattia)
—	DF	UKR	Andriy Hryhoryk (from Kryvbas)
—	DF	UKR	Ihor Tyschenko (from Feniks-Illychovets)
22	MF	UKR	Pavlo Ksyonz (from Zakarpattia)
42	GK	UKR	Andriy Tovt (from FC Obolon Kyiv)
3	DF	BRA	Corrêa (from Clube Atlético Paranaense)
28	MF	UKR	Oleksiy Polyansky (on loan from Shakhtar)
15	FW	UKR	Oleksandr Ivaschenko (from Kryvbas)

Out: Note: Flags indicate national team as defined under FIFA eligibility rules; some limited exceptions apply. Players may hold more than one non-FIFA nationality.

No.	Pos.	Nation	Player
6	DF	UKR	Oleh Krasnoperov (to FC Vorskla Poltava)
22	MF	UKR	Nikita Kamenyuka (to FC Zorya Luhansk)
55	FW	UKR	Vyacheslav Sharpar (to Naftovyk)
3	DF	UKR	Oleh Timchishin
17	DF	UKR	Oleksandr Maltsev
21	DF	UKR	Serhiy Yavorskyi
26	DF	UKR	Ihor Buryak (to FC Dniester Ovidiopol)

=== FC Karpaty Lviv ===
In: Note: Flags indicate national team as defined under FIFA eligibility rules; some limited exceptions apply. Players may hold more than one non-FIFA nationality.

No.	Pos.	Nation	Player
—	DF	SRB	Ivan Milošević (from Mladost)
—	DF	UKR	Taras Karabin (from FC Dniester Ovidiopol)
—	GK	UKR	Vsevolod Romanenko (from Zakarpattia)
TBA	FW	UKR	Serhiy Kuznetsov (from Nosta Novotroitsk)
99	MF	GEO	Aleksandre Guruli (from Lyon Reserves)

Out: Note: Flags indicate national team as defined under FIFA eligibility rules; some limited exceptions apply. Players may hold more than one non-FIFA nationality.

No.	Pos.	Nation	Player
—	DF	UKR	Mykola Ischenko (to FC Shakhtar Donetsk)
33	MF	BLR	Pavel Kirilchik (to FC Illychivets Mariupol)
1	GK	POL	Maciej Nalepa (to FC Kharkiv)

=== FC Kharkiv ===
In: Note: Flags indicate national team as defined under FIFA eligibility rules; some limited exceptions apply. Players may hold more than one non-FIFA nationality.

No.	Pos.	Nation	Player
—	GK	POL	Maciej Nalepa (from FC Karpaty Lviv)
—	FW	UKR	Ruslan Platon (from FC Zakarpattia Uzhhorod)
—	DF	UKR	Ivan Kozoriz (from FC Zakarpattia Uzhhorod)
—	MF	UKR	Oleksiy Ivanov (from Naftovyk)
—	MF	UKR	Artem Kasyanov (from FC Metalurh Donetsk)
—	MF	UKR	Valeriy Boychenko (promoted from Kharkiv Reserves)

Out: Note: Flags indicate national team as defined under FIFA eligibility rules; some limited exceptions apply. Players may hold more than one non-FIFA nationality.

No.	Pos.	Nation	Player
3	DF	UKR	Oleh Karamushka (returned from loan to FC Shakhtar Donetsk)
7	DF	UKR	Andriy Berezovchuk (to Metalurh Donetsk)
1	GK	UKR	Rustam Khudzhamov (to FC Shakhtar Donetsk)
44	DF	UKR	Artem Fedetskyy (to FC Shakhtar Donetsk)

=== FC Kryvbas Kryvyi Rih ===
In: Note: Flags indicate national team as defined under FIFA eligibility rules; some limited exceptions apply. Players may hold more than one non-FIFA nationality.

No.	Pos.	Nation	Player
11	MF	CRO	Mladen Bartulović (on loan from Dnipro Dnipropetrovsk)
5	DF	BLR	Aleksandr Shagoyko (from FC Gomel)
15	DF	UKR	Serhiy Matiukhin (on loan from Dnipro)
—	GK	UKR	Artem Kusliy (on loan from Dnipro Dnipropetrovsk)
—	FW	UKR	Kostantyn Balabanov (on loan from Dnipro Dnipropetrovsk)
—	DF	UKR	Vyacheslav Serdyuk (on loan from Dnipro Dnipropetrovsk)
—	MF	UKR	Oleksandr Maksymov (on loan from Dnipro Dnipropetrovsk)
35	MF	UKR	Pavlo Pashaiv (on loan from Dnipro Dnipropetrovsk)

Out: Note: Flags indicate national team as defined under FIFA eligibility rules; some limited exceptions apply. Players may hold more than one non-FIFA nationality.

No.	Pos.	Nation	Player
3	DF	UKR	Victor Mel'nyk (to FC Chornomorets Odesa)
22	DF	UKR	Vitaly Lysytsky (returned from loan to Dnipro Dnipropetrovsk)
34	DF	UKR	Maksym Pashaiv (returned from loan to Dnipro Dnipropetrovsk)
—	DF	UKR	Ivan Kucherenko (footballer) (to Astana)
1	GK	UKR	Oleh Ostapenko
15	MF	UKR	Andriy Honcharenko
25	MF	UKR	Andriy Hryhoryk (to Illychivets)
26	MF	UKR	Anton Korolchuk
19	DF	ALB	Henri Ndreka
26	FW	UKR	Yuriy Kolomiyets
32	GK	ALB	Isli Hidi (to Alki Larnaca)
7	FW	UKR	Vasyl Sachko (to Vorskla Poltava)
16	FW	UKR	Oleksandr Ivaschenko (to Illychivets)

=== FC Lviv ===
In: Note: Flags indicate national team as defined under FIFA eligibility rules; some limited exceptions apply. Players may hold more than one non-FIFA nationality.

No.	Pos.	Nation	Player
—	DF	UKR	Vladyslav Vashchuk (from FC Dynamo Kyiv)
—	MF	UKR	Ivan Kotenko (on loan from Dnipro)
—	DF	UKR	Anatoliy Kitsuta (on loan from Dynamo Kyiv)
—	GK	UKR	Oleksandr Vysotskyy
—	MF	UKR	Oleksandr Tkatchuk
11	FW	UKR	Artem Mostovyy (from Stal Alchevsk)
10	FW	UKR	Dmytro Hordienko (from FC Enerhetyk Burshtyn)

Out: Note: Flags indicate national team as defined under FIFA eligibility rules; some limited exceptions apply. Players may hold more than one non-FIFA nationality.

No.	Pos.	Nation	Player
20	MF	UKR	Andriy Khanas (to Knyazha Schaslyve)
11	FW	UKR	Artem Mostovyy (to FC Desna Chernihiv)

=== FC Metalist Kharkiv ===
In: Note: Flags indicate national team as defined under FIFA eligibility rules; some limited exceptions apply. Players may hold more than one non-FIFA nationality.

No.	Pos.	Nation	Player
2	DF	UKR	Andriy Koniushenko (from FC Zorya Luhansk)
4	MF	CIV	Abdoulaye Djire (from K.F.C. Germinal Beerschot)
TBA	MF	ALG	Lazhar Hadj Aïssa (from ES Sétif)
27	DF	ARG	Jonathan Maidana (from Boca Juniors)

Out: Note: Flags indicate national team as defined under FIFA eligibility rules; some limited exceptions apply. Players may hold more than one non-FIFA nationality.

No.	Pos.	Nation	Player
4	DF	MKD	Vlade Lazarevski (end of loan, returned to Groclin)
13	DF	MAR	Hicham Mahdoufi
11	FW	UKR	Serhiy Davydov
89	GK	UKR	Denys Sydorenko (on loan to FC Dniester Ovidiopol)
21	MF	UKR	Roman Svitlychnuy
51	DF	UKR	Serhiy Kostiuk
27	MF	UKR	Pavlo Rebenok (on loan to FC Chornomorets Odesa)
TBA	MF	ALG	Lazhar Hadj Aïssa (back to ES Sétif)

=== FC Metalurh Donetsk ===
In: Note: Flags indicate national team as defined under FIFA eligibility rules; some limited exceptions apply. Players may hold more than one non-FIFA nationality.

No.	Pos.	Nation	Player
—	MF	CYP	Constantinos Makrides (from APOEL F.C.)
—	DF	UKR	Andriy Berezovchuk (from FC Kharkiv)
—	MF	BUL	Velizar Dimitrov (from CSKA Sofia)
—	DF	BRA	William Boaventura (from Anorthosis Famagusta)
—	DF	POR	Mário Sérgio (from Naval 1º de Maio)
—	FW	NGA	Sunny Ekeh Kingsley (from AEK Larnaca for 620,000 euro)
—	MF	UKR	Oleksandr Zotov (from Chornomorets)
—	FW	UKR	Serhiy Shyschenko (from Chornomorets)
--	MF	BRA	Fabinho (from FC Brașov)

Out: Note: Flags indicate national team as defined under FIFA eligibility rules; some limited exceptions apply. Players may hold more than one non-FIFA nationality.

No.	Pos.	Nation	Player
53	MF	UKR	Vitaliy Havrysh (on loan to Stal Alchevsk)
32	DF	UKR	Dmytro Nazarenko (on loan to Stal Alchevsk)
99	FW	UKR	Oleh Myshchenko (on loan to Stal Alchevsk)
10	FW	UKR	Oleksandr Kosyrin (to FC Chornomorets Odesa)
88	FW	UKR	Artem Kasyanov (to FC Kharkiv)
8	DF	SRB	Marko Grubelić
20	MF	SRB	Ivan Gvozdenović
9	FW	BRA	Ailton
77	MF	NED	Jordi Cruijff
70	FW	BRA	Paulo Vogt

=== FC Metalurh Zaporizhzhia ===
In: Note: Flags indicate national team as defined under FIFA eligibility rules; some limited exceptions apply. Players may hold more than one non-FIFA nationality.

No.	Pos.	Nation	Player
16	FW	NGA	Michael Chidi Alozi (from FC Volyn Lutsk)

Out: Note: Flags indicate national team as defined under FIFA eligibility rules; some limited exceptions apply. Players may hold more than one non-FIFA nationality.

No.	Pos.	Nation	Player
7	MF	BLR	Mykola Kashevsky (to Illychivets)
21	MF	UKR	Ruslan Lubarskiy
19	GK	UKR	Stanyslav Bohush (to Dynamo Kyiv)

=== FC Shakhtar Donetsk ===
In: Note: Flags indicate national team as defined under FIFA eligibility rules; some limited exceptions apply. Players may hold more than one non-FIFA nationality.

No.	Pos.	Nation	Player
32	DF	UKR	Mykola Ischenko (from FC Karpaty Lviv)
99	FW	BOL	Marcelo Moreno (from Cruzeiro EC)
12	GK	UKR	Rustam Khudzhamov (from FC Kharkiv)
36	DF	UKR	Oleksandr Chizhov (from Vorskla Poltava)
—	DF	UKR	Oleh Karamushka (returned from loan)
—	MF	UKR	Yevhen Bredun (returned from loan)
44	DF	UKR	Artem Fedetskyy (from FC Kharkiv)

Out: Note: Flags indicate national team as defined under FIFA eligibility rules; some limited exceptions apply. Players may hold more than one non-FIFA nationality.

No.	Pos.	Nation	Player
15	MF	SRB	Zvonimir Vukić (to FC Moscow)
16	GK	CZE	Jan Laštůvka (on loan to West Ham)
20	FW	UKR	Oleksiy Byelik (to FC Dnipro Dnipropetrovsk)
—	GK	UKR	Dmytro Shutkov
—	FW	UKR	Vadym Shavrin (on loan to Stal Alchevsk)
—	FW	UKR	Serhiy Pivnenko (on loan to Arsenal Kyiv)
—	MF	UKR	Yevhen Bredun (to youth squad)
28	MF	UKR	Oleksiy Polyansky (on loan to Illychivets)
—	DF	UKR	Oleh Karamushka (to Tavriya Simferopol)

=== SC Tavriya Simferopol ===
In: Note: Flags indicate national team as defined under FIFA eligibility rules; some limited exceptions apply. Players may hold more than one non-FIFA nationality.

No.	Pos.	Nation	Player
—	FW	GEO	Vasil Gigiadze (from Naftovyk)
—	MF	UKR	Andriy Donets' (from Zakarpattia)
3	DF	SRB	Ivan Babić (from FK Partizan)
—	DF	LTU	Vidas Alunderis (from Zagłębie Lubin)
38	FW	UKR	Volodymyr Korobka (from Dnipro Reserves)
6	DF	SRB	Miloš Živković (from FK Borac Čačak)
25	GK	LTU	Marius Rapalis (from FK Žalgiris Vilnius)
—	DF	UKR	Oleh Karamushka (to Shakhtar Donetsk)
8	MF	UKR	Yevhenniy Shmakov (free agent (Dynamo/Arsenal))
24	MF	GEO	Vladimir Burduli (from Zorya)

Out: Note: Flags indicate national team as defined under FIFA eligibility rules; some limited exceptions apply. Players may hold more than one non-FIFA nationality.

No.	Pos.	Nation	Player
3	DF	UKR	Oleksandr Pershin
4	DF	UKR	Vitaly Rozgon
8	MF	RUS	Herman Kutarba
99	DF	NGA	Harrison Omoko (to Zorya)
3	DF	SRB	Ivan Babić (broke contract)

=== FC Vorskla Poltava ===
In: Note: Flags indicate national team as defined under FIFA eligibility rules; some limited exceptions apply. Players may hold more than one non-FIFA nationality.

No.	Pos.	Nation	Player
5	DF	UKR	Oleh Krasnoperov (from FC Illychivets Mariupol)
40	FW	UKR	Roman Loktionov (from FC Kremin Kremenchuk)
7	FW	UKR	Vasyl Sachko (from Kryvbas)

Out: Note: Flags indicate national team as defined under FIFA eligibility rules; some limited exceptions apply. Players may hold more than one non-FIFA nationality.

No.	Pos.	Nation	Player
—	DF	UKR	Oleksandr Chizhov (to Shakhtar Donetsk)
15	MF	UKR	Serhiy Dyachenko
47	MF	UKR	Mykhail Pryadko
51	GK	UKR	Roman Chumak (to FC Kremin Kremenchuk)
-	MF	UKR	Valentyn Platonov
-	MF	SRB	Aleksandar Stoimirović
6	MF	UKR	Oleksandr Nychyporuk
10	FW	GEO	Lasha Jakobia
17	DF	UKR	Oleksandr Donets
19	MF	UKR	Eduard Tsykhmeystruk
41	DF	UKR	Vladyslav Rudchenko
42	FW	UKR	Andriy Mykyychuk
46	FW	UKR	Maksym Lubenets (to FC Poltava)
—	MF	UKR	Vasyl Klymov (to FC Kremin Kremenchuk)

=== FC Zorya Luhansk ===
In: Note: Flags indicate national team as defined under FIFA eligibility rules; some limited exceptions apply. Players may hold more than one non-FIFA nationality.

No.	Pos.	Nation	Player
—	MF	ARG	Rubén Gómez (on 1 year loan from FC Metalurh Donetsk)
—	MF	UKR	Nykita Kameniuka (from FC Illychivets Mariupol)
—	FW	ALB	Parid Xhihani (from KS Besa Kavajë)
—	FW	UKR	Anatoliy Didenko (from Zakarpattia)
—	MF	UKR	Oleh Yermak (on loan from Shakhtar Donetsk)
34	DF	UKR	Serhiy Siminin (returned from loan from Volyn)
—	DF	NGA	Harrison Omoko (from Tavriya)
—	MF	MNE	Mirko Raičević (from Budućnost)
15	FW	CMR	Colins Ngaha Poungoue (from Otaci)
—	DF	UKR	Andriy Hrinchenko
—	DF	MDA	Vadym Bolokhan (from Dacia Chişinău)
—	MF	BRA	Junior Godoi (from Legia Warszawa)
—	FW	CMR	Stephane Baga (from Chonburi FC)

Out: Note: Flags indicate national team as defined under FIFA eligibility rules; some limited exceptions apply. Players may hold more than one non-FIFA nationality.

No.	Pos.	Nation	Player
2	MF	CRO	Shpëtim Babaj (to FC Shakhter)
9	FW	UKR	Dmytro Vorobey (to Illychivets)
14	DF	UKR	Artem Savin (to Illychivets)
11	FW	NGA	Onyekachi Nwoha
22	DF	UKR	Andriy Koniushenko (to FC Metalist Kharkiv)
3	DF	SRB	Jurica Puliz
4	FW	UKR	Vladyslav Holopyorov
7	FW	UKR	Yevhen Lutsenko (to Chornomorets)
8	MF	SRB	Darko Dunjić
10	DF	SRB	Mirko Bunjevćević
13	MF	TUN	Toafik Salhi
17	MF	UKR	Yevheniy Bredun (loan return to FC Shakhtar Donetsk)
19	FW	UKR	Yuriy Tselykh
23	FW	UKR	Dmytriy Brovkin
24	MF	UKR	Ivan Matyazh
55	MF	SRB	Igor Petković
88	MF	GEO	Vladimir Burduli

== First League ==
=== FC Desna Chernihiv ===
In: Note: Flags indicate national team as defined under FIFA eligibility rules; some limited exceptions apply. Players may hold more than one non-FIFA nationality.

No.	Pos.	Nation	Player
4	DF	GUI	Mamadi Sangare (from FC Nistru Otaci)

Out: Note: Flags indicate national team as defined under FIFA eligibility rules; some limited exceptions apply. Players may hold more than one non-FIFA nationality.

No.	Pos.	Nation	Player
—	FW	UKR	Volodymyr Postolatyev (from PFC Oleksandria)
—	GK	UKR	Andriy Fedorenko (On Loan to FC Desna-2 Chernihiv)

=== FC Dniester Ovidiopol ===
In: Note: Flags indicate national team as defined under FIFA eligibility rules; some limited exceptions apply. Players may hold more than one non-FIFA nationality.

No.	Pos.	Nation	Player
—	MF	UKR	Vitaliy Starovyk (from Krymteplitsia)
—	MF	UKR	Dmytro Leonov (from Khimik)
—	FW	UKR	Ruslan Kachur (from FK Simurq Zaqatala)
—	DF	UKR	Bohdan Smyshko (from MFK Mykolaiv)
—	GK	UKR	Denys Sydorenko (on loan from FC Metalist Kharkiv)
—	MF	UKR	Yuriy Konshin (on loan from FC Shakhtar-3 Donetsk)
—	FW	UKR	Oleksandr Batal'skyi (from FC Arsenal Kyiv)
—	MF	UKR	Serhiy Polytilo (from Chornomorets)
—	MF	UKR	Yakov Zalevskiy (from Torpedo Zhodino)
—	MF	UKR	Igor Pokarinin (from FC Desna Chernihiv)
26	DF	UKR	Ihor Buryak (from FC Illychivets Mariupol)

Out: Note: Flags indicate national team as defined under FIFA eligibility rules; some limited exceptions apply. Players may hold more than one non-FIFA nationality.

No.	Pos.	Nation	Player
24	DF	UKR	Taras Karabin (to FC Karpaty Lviv)
27	DF	GEO	Kakhaber Mzhavanadze (to Chornomorets)
3	DF	UKR	Volodymyr Voznyy (to FC Feniks-Illychovets Kalinine)

=== FC Dynamo-2 Kyiv ===
In: Note: Flags indicate national team as defined under FIFA eligibility rules; some limited exceptions apply. Players may hold more than one non-FIFA nationality.

No.	Pos.	Nation	Player
1	GK	UKR	Denys Boyko (from FC Dynamo-3 Kyiv)
14	DF	UKR	Oleksiy Dovhyy (from Dynamo Reserves)
3	DF	UKR	Temur Partsvania (from Dynamo Reserves)
12	GK	UKR	Roman Zahladko (from FC Dynamo-3 Kyiv)
2	DF	UKR	Vadym Rodina (from FC Dynamo-3 Kyiv)
6	DF	UKR	Dmytro Kushnirov (from FC Dynamo-3 Kyiv)
15	DF	UKR	Serhiy Liul'ka (from FC Dynamo-3 Kyiv)
11	FW	UKR	Serhiy Shevchuk (from FC Dynamo-3 Kyiv)
TBA	FW	UKR	Yaroslav Sokol (from FC Dynamo-3 Kyiv)
TBA	FW	UKR	Mykhaylo Malin
—	MF	UKR	Serhiy Rybalka (from FC Arsenal Kharkiv)
—	FW	GEO	Otar Martsvaladze (return from loan from FC Zakarpattia Uzhhorod)

Out: Note: Flags indicate national team as defined under FIFA eligibility rules; some limited exceptions apply. Players may hold more than one non-FIFA nationality.

No.	Pos.	Nation	Player
—	MF	UKR	Oleh Myshchenko (to Metalurh Donetsk)
—	MF	UKR	Oleh Herasymyuk (to Neftchi)
—	GK	UKR	Yaroslav Hodzyur (to FC Terek Grozny)
—	DF	UKR	Yevhen Khacheridi
—	DF	UKR	Oleksandr Romanchuk (promoted to Dynamo Kyiv)
—	FW	UKR	Andriy Yarmolenko (promoted to Dynamo Kyiv)
—	MF	UKR	Mykola Morozyuk (promoted to Dynamo Kyiv)
—	FW	UKR	Roman Zozulya (promoted to Dynamo Kyiv)
—	DF	GEO	Davit Imediashvili
—	DF	UKR	Taras Pinchuk
—	MF	UKR	Denys Dedechko

=== FC Enerhetyk Burshtyn ===
In: Note: Flags indicate national team as defined under FIFA eligibility rules; some limited exceptions apply. Players may hold more than one non-FIFA nationality.

No.	Pos.	Nation	Player

Out: Note: Flags indicate national team as defined under FIFA eligibility rules; some limited exceptions apply. Players may hold more than one non-FIFA nationality.

No.	Pos.	Nation	Player
10	FW	UKR	Dmytro Hordienko (to FC Lviv)

=== FC Feniks-Illychovets Kalinine ===
In: Note: Flags indicate national team as defined under FIFA eligibility rules; some limited exceptions apply. Players may hold more than one non-FIFA nationality.

No.	Pos.	Nation	Player
—	GK	UKR	Vitaliy Kapinus (from FC Shakhtar Sverdlovsk)
—	GK	UKR	Naryman Yakubov (from FC Chernomorneftehaz (Crimea))
—	DF	UKR	Ihor Stanyslav (from FC Chernomorneftehaz (Crimea))
—	DF	UKR	Yevheniy Kvanin (from Tavriya Reserves)
—	DF	UKR	Oleh Shevchenko (from FC Stal Dniprodzerzhynsk)
—	DF	UKR	Volodymyr Voznyy (from FC Dniester Ovidiopol)
—	MF	UKR	Yuriy Danchenko (from FC Dnipro Cherkasy)
—	FW	UKR	Anton Holenkiv (from FC Chernomorneftehaz (Crimea))
—	FW	UKR	Mykola Khomych (from FC Chernomorneftehaz (Crimea))
—	FW	UKR	Maksym Demchenko (from FC Chernomorneftehaz (Crimea))
—	FW	UKR	Vitaliy Prokopchenko (from FC Krymteplitsia Molodizhne)
—	FW	UKR	Oleksandr Savanchuk (from FC Krymteplitsia Molodizhne)

Out: Note: Flags indicate national team as defined under FIFA eligibility rules; some limited exceptions apply. Players may hold more than one non-FIFA nationality.

No.	Pos.	Nation	Player
—	MF	UKR	Ihor Tyschenko (to Illychivets)
—	FW	UKR	Vyacheslav Shevchenko (to Stal Alchevsk)
—	MF	UKR	Hennadiy Ehoriv (to PFC Sevastopol)
—	FW	UKR	Maksym Demchenko (to PFC Sevastopol)

=== FC Helios Kharkiv ===
In: Note: Flags indicate national team as defined under FIFA eligibility rules; some limited exceptions apply. Players may hold more than one non-FIFA nationality.

No.	Pos.	Nation	Player

Out: Note: Flags indicate national team as defined under FIFA eligibility rules; some limited exceptions apply. Players may hold more than one non-FIFA nationality.

No.	Pos.	Nation	Player

=== FC Ihroservice Simferopol ===
In: Note: Flags indicate national team as defined under FIFA eligibility rules; some limited exceptions apply. Players may hold more than one non-FIFA nationality.

No.	Pos.	Nation	Player

Out: Note: Flags indicate national team as defined under FIFA eligibility rules; some limited exceptions apply. Players may hold more than one non-FIFA nationality.

No.	Pos.	Nation	Player

=== FC Knyazha Schaslyve ===
In: Note: Flags indicate national team as defined under FIFA eligibility rules; some limited exceptions apply. Players may hold more than one non-FIFA nationality.

No.	Pos.	Nation	Player
—	DF	UKR	Andriy Bashlai (from Prykarpattya Ivano-Frankivsk)
—	DF	UKR	Andriy Khanas (from FC Lviv)
—	MF	UKR	Vitaliy Kuianov (from CSKA Kyiv)
—	MF	UKR	Dmytro Zozulya (from FC Obolon Kyiv)

Out: Note: Flags indicate national team as defined under FIFA eligibility rules; some limited exceptions apply. Players may hold more than one non-FIFA nationality.

No.	Pos.	Nation	Player

=== FC Komunalnyk Luhansk ===
In: Note: Flags indicate national team as defined under FIFA eligibility rules; some limited exceptions apply. Players may hold more than one non-FIFA nationality.

No.	Pos.	Nation	Player

Out: Note: Flags indicate national team as defined under FIFA eligibility rules; some limited exceptions apply. Players may hold more than one non-FIFA nationality.

No.	Pos.	Nation	Player

=== FC Krymteplitsia Molodizhne ===
In: Note: Flags indicate national team as defined under FIFA eligibility rules; some limited exceptions apply. Players may hold more than one non-FIFA nationality.

No.	Pos.	Nation	Player
99	GK	UKR	Ihor Vitiv
9	FW	UKR	Anatoliy Vorona
29	FW	CIV	Diaby Suleyman

Out: Note: Flags indicate national team as defined under FIFA eligibility rules; some limited exceptions apply. Players may hold more than one non-FIFA nationality.

No.	Pos.	Nation	Player
19	MF	UKR	Vitaliy Starovyk (to Dniester)
25	FW	UKR	Vitaliy Prokopchenko (to FC Feniks-Illychovets Kalinine)
13	FW	UKR	Oleksandr Savanchuk (to FC Feniks-Illychovets Kalinine)

=== FC Naftovyk-Ukrnafta Okhtyrka ===
In: Note: Flags indicate national team as defined under FIFA eligibility rules; some limited exceptions apply. Players may hold more than one non-FIFA nationality.

No.	Pos.	Nation	Player
27	GK	UKR	Andriy Mel'nyk
24	MF	UKR	Serhiy Bryzh
18	FW	UKR	Vitaliy Andrukhiv
17	FW	UKR	Vyacheslav Sharpar (from FC Illychivets Mariupol)
8	MF	UKR	Ihor Prokuror

Out: Note: Flags indicate national team as defined under FIFA eligibility rules; some limited exceptions apply. Players may hold more than one non-FIFA nationality.

No.	Pos.	Nation	Player
32	MF	UKR	Serhiy Snytko
45	MF	RUS	Valentin Nefyodov (to Illchivets)
47	DF	UKR	Volodymyr Olefir (to Neftchi)
—	DF	GEO	Vasil Gigiadze (to Tavriya)
55	GK	UKR	Artem Kusliy (to Krybvbas)
19	FW	UKR	Kostantyn Balabanov (to Krybvbas)
4	DF	UKR	Vyacheslav Serdyuk (to Krybvbas)
37	MF	UKR	Ruslan Bidnenko (return from loan to Dnipro)
28	MF	UKR	Ivan Kotenko (return from loan to Dnipro)
44	MF	UKR	Oleksiy Ivanov (to FC Kharkiv)

=== FC Obolon Kyiv ===
In: Note: Flags indicate national team as defined under FIFA eligibility rules; some limited exceptions apply. Players may hold more than one non-FIFA nationality.

No.	Pos.	Nation	Player

Out: Note: Flags indicate national team as defined under FIFA eligibility rules; some limited exceptions apply. Players may hold more than one non-FIFA nationality.

No.	Pos.	Nation	Player
42	GK	UKR	Andriy Tovt (to Illychivets)
29	MF	UKR	Dmytro Zozulya (to FC Knyazha Schaslyve)

=== PFC Olexandria ===
In: Note: Flags indicate national team as defined under FIFA eligibility rules; some limited exceptions apply. Players may hold more than one non-FIFA nationality.

No.	Pos.	Nation	Player

Out: Note: Flags indicate national team as defined under FIFA eligibility rules; some limited exceptions apply. Players may hold more than one non-FIFA nationality.

No.	Pos.	Nation	Player

=== FSC Prykarpattya Ivano-Frankivsk ===
In: Note: Flags indicate national team as defined under FIFA eligibility rules; some limited exceptions apply. Players may hold more than one non-FIFA nationality.

No.	Pos.	Nation	Player

Out: Note: Flags indicate national team as defined under FIFA eligibility rules; some limited exceptions apply. Players may hold more than one non-FIFA nationality.

No.	Pos.	Nation	Player
—	DF	UKR	Andriy Bashlai (to FC Knyazha Schaslyve)

=== PFC Sevastopol ===
In: Note: Flags indicate national team as defined under FIFA eligibility rules; some limited exceptions apply. Players may hold more than one non-FIFA nationality.

No.	Pos.	Nation	Player
—	FW	UKR	Roman Dovzhyk (from Khimik)
15	FW	UKR	Albert Shakhov (from Khimik)
—	DF	UKR	Volofymr Demydemko (from Feniks-Illychovets)
—	MF	UKR	Henadiy Ehoriv (from Feniks-Illychovets)

Out: Note: Flags indicate national team as defined under FIFA eligibility rules; some limited exceptions apply. Players may hold more than one non-FIFA nationality.

No.	Pos.	Nation	Player
—	MF	UKR	Serhiy Ferenchak
—	MF	UKR	Vitaliy Tereshuk
—	MF	UKR	Mustafa Abliametov
—	FW	UKR	Andriy Khrypko
—	DF	UKR	Anatoliy Sanin

=== FC Stal Alchevsk ===
In: Note: Flags indicate national team as defined under FIFA eligibility rules; some limited exceptions apply. Players may hold more than one non-FIFA nationality.

No.	Pos.	Nation	Player
2	DF	UKR	Dmytro Nazarenko (on loan from Metalurh Donetsk)
4	DF	UKR	Roman Pasychnychenko (promoted from FC Stal-2 Alchevsk)
5	DF	UKR	Vitaliy Havrysh (on loan from Metalurh Donetsk)
7	FW	UKR	Vadym Shavrin (on loan from Shakhtar Donetsk)
8	MF	UKR	Vyacheslav Pidnebesnyy (on loan from Shakhtar Donetsk)
9	FW	UKR	Oleh Myshchenko (on loan from Metalurh Donetsk)
12	GK	UKR	Oleksandr Haydarzhy (from MFK Mykolaiv)
17	FW	UKR	Yuriy Fomenko (from MFK Mykolaiv)
24	FW	UKR	Vyacheslav Shevchenko (from FC Feniks-Illychovets Kalinine)
31	GK	UKR	Volodymyr Shobotenko (promoted from FC Stal-2 Alchevsk)
17	FW	UKR	Rinar Valeyev (on loan from FC Chornmorets Odesa)
25	FW	MDA	Valeriu Onila (from FC Dacia Chişinău)

Out: Note: Flags indicate national team as defined under FIFA eligibility rules; some limited exceptions apply. Players may hold more than one non-FIFA nationality.

No.	Pos.	Nation	Player
2	DF	UKR	Oleksandr Polunynskyy
4	MF	UKR	Serhiy Chybotayiv
5	DF	UKR	Oleksandr Maklakov
6	DF	UKR	Serhiy Andriyiv (to FC Stal-2 Alchevsk)
7	FW	UKR	Serhiy Artiukh
8	MF	UKR	Denys Havrylenko
9	MF	UKR	Hennadiy Koshelev
12	GK	UKR	Vadym Startsev
13	DF	UKR	Dmytriy Mynka (to FC Stal-2 Alchevsk)
16	MF	UKR	Oleksandr Vasyliv
17	MF	UKR	Yevheniy Zarychniuk
20	DF	UKR	Oleksandr Zarytskyy
24	DF	UKR	Lyubomyr Ivanskyy
28	MF	UKR	Artur Yeremenko (to FC Stal-2 Alchevsk)
30	GK	UKR	Volodymyr Nytsetskyy (to FC Stal-2 Alchevsk)
34	MF	UKR	Roman Lylylyn
11	FW	UKR	Artem Mostovyy (to FC Lviv)
17	FW	UKR	Yuriy Fomenko (free agent)
11	FW	UKR	Dmitriy Kozliv (to FC Stal Dniprodzerzhynsk)

=== FC Volyn Lutsk ===
In: Note: Flags indicate national team as defined under FIFA eligibility rules; some limited exceptions apply. Players may hold more than one non-FIFA nationality.

No.	Pos.	Nation	Player
—	DF	UKR	Mykhaylo Hurko (from FC Obolon Kyiv)
—	DF	UKR	Andriy Orlatyy (from MFK Mykolaiv)
—	DF	UKR	Yevheniy Palamarchuk (from FC CSKA Kyiv)
—	MF	UKR	Mykola Lapko (from Simurq)
—	MF	UKR	Andriy Stapanov (from FC Petrolul Ploieşti)
—	FW	MDA	Oleg Hromțov (from FC Dnipro Cherkasy)
—	FW	UKR	Serhiy Kovalenko (from Roeselare)
—	MF	UKR	Ihor Bukanov (from Metalist)

Out: Note: Flags indicate national team as defined under FIFA eligibility rules; some limited exceptions apply. Players may hold more than one non-FIFA nationality.

No.	Pos.	Nation	Player
16	FW	NGA	Michael Chidi Alozi (to FC Metalurh Zaporizhzhia)
34	DF	UKR	Serhiy Siminin (returned from loan to Zorya)
10	MF	UKR	Roman Maksymiuk (to FC Atyrau)
23	MF	UKR	Mykola Hibaliuk
13	MF	BRA	Braze Zhader da Silva (free agent)

=== FC Zakarpattia Uzhhorod ===
In: Note: Flags indicate national team as defined under FIFA eligibility rules; some limited exceptions apply. Players may hold more than one non-FIFA nationality.

No.	Pos.	Nation	Player
2	DF	ALB	Ervis Kraja (from Vllaznia Shkodër)
—	FW	UKR	Olexandr Lishchuk (from FK Vindava Ventspils)
39	DF	UKR	Maksym Zinakov (promoted from Zakarpattia-2)
40	DF	UKR	Mykhaylo Kroka (promoted from Zakarpattia-2)
41	MF	UKR	Vasyl Pylyp (promoted from Zakarpattia-2)
-	FW	NGA	Eddy Dombraye

Out: Note: Flags indicate national team as defined under FIFA eligibility rules; some limited exceptions apply. Players may hold more than one non-FIFA nationality.

No.	Pos.	Nation	Player
—	FW	UKR	Ruslan Platon (to FC Kharkiv)
22	DF	UKR	Ivan Kozoriz (to FC Kharkiv)
4	MF	UKR	Andriy Donets' (to SC Tavriya Simferopol)
24	DF	UKR	Ihor Chuchman (to Illychivets)
9	FW	UKR	Pavlo Ksyonz (to Illychivets)
1	GK	UKR	Vsevolod Romanenko (to Karpaty)
29	FW	UKR	Anatoliy Didenko (to Zorya)
14	MF	MNE	Miloš Popović (to Čukarički Stankom)
8	FW	GEO	Otar Martsvaladze (return from loan to FC Dynamo-2 Kyiv)

== Ukrainian Second League ==
=== Druha A ===
==== FC Desna-2 Chernihiv ====
In: Note: Flags indicate national team as defined under FIFA eligibility rules; some limited exceptions apply. Players may hold more than one non-FIFA nationality.

No.	Pos.	Nation	Player
—	GK	UKR	Andriy Fedorenko (On Loan From Desna Chernihiv)

Out: Note: Flags indicate national team as defined under FIFA eligibility rules; some limited exceptions apply. Players may hold more than one non-FIFA nationality.

No.	Pos.	Nation	Player

==== FC Dnipro Cherkasy ====
In: Note: Flags indicate national team as defined under FIFA eligibility rules; some limited exceptions apply. Players may hold more than one non-FIFA nationality.

No.	Pos.	Nation	Player

Out: Note: Flags indicate national team as defined under FIFA eligibility rules; some limited exceptions apply. Players may hold more than one non-FIFA nationality.

No.	Pos.	Nation	Player
11	FW	MDA	Oleg Hromțov (to FC Volyn Lutsk)
25	MF	UKR	Yuriy Danchenko (to FC Feniks-Illychovets Kalinine)
2	DF	UKR	Maksym Stoyan (to FC Desna Chernihiv)
8	MF	UKR	Petro Kondratyuk (to FC Desna Chernihiv)

=== Druha B ===
==== FC Arsenal Kharkiv ====
In: Note: Flags indicate national team as defined under FIFA eligibility rules; some limited exceptions apply. Players may hold more than one non-FIFA nationality.

No.	Pos.	Nation	Player

Out: Note: Flags indicate national team as defined under FIFA eligibility rules; some limited exceptions apply. Players may hold more than one non-FIFA nationality.

No.	Pos.	Nation	Player
11	MF	UKR	Serhiy Rybalka (to Dynamo Kyiv)

==== FC Kremin Kremenchuk ====
In: Note: Flags indicate national team as defined under FIFA eligibility rules; some limited exceptions apply. Players may hold more than one non-FIFA nationality.

No.	Pos.	Nation	Player
—	MF	UKR	Vasyl Klymov (on loan from FC Vorskla Poltava)
13	MF	UKR	Artem Gryshyn (on loan from FC Vorskla Poltava)
—		UKR	Vadym Hetman (from FC Enerhiya Yuzhnoukrainsk)
—		UKR	Viacheslav Kuianov (from FC Enerhiya Yuzhnoukrainsk)
—		UKR	Valeriy Kureleh
51	GK	UKR	Roman Chumak (on loan from FC Vorskla Poltava)

Out: Note: Flags indicate national team as defined under FIFA eligibility rules; some limited exceptions apply. Players may hold more than one non-FIFA nationality.

No.	Pos.	Nation	Player
10	FW	UKR	Roman Loktionov (to FC Vorskla Poltava)
1	GK	UKR	Yuriy Hrienko
6	FW	UKR	Eduard Gulordava
14	MF	UKR	Evgen Shevchenko
19	FW	UKR	Edvin Valeev
22	FW	UKR	Sergiy Kikot
—	FW	UKR	Vitaliy Kozlov

==== FC Shakhtar-3 Donetsk ====
In: Note: Flags indicate national team as defined under FIFA eligibility rules; some limited exceptions apply. Players may hold more than one non-FIFA nationality.

No.	Pos.	Nation	Player

Out: Note: Flags indicate national team as defined under FIFA eligibility rules; some limited exceptions apply. Players may hold more than one non-FIFA nationality.

No.	Pos.	Nation	Player
--	MF	UKR	Yuriy Konshin (on loan to FC Dniester Ovidiopol)

==== FC Stal Dniprodzerzhynsk ====
In: Note: Flags indicate national team as defined under FIFA eligibility rules; some limited exceptions apply. Players may hold more than one non-FIFA nationality.

No.	Pos.	Nation	Player
—	FW	UKR	Dmytro Kozliv (from Stal Alchevsk)
—	DF	UKR	Pavlo Leshko (from FC Korosten)

Out: Note: Flags indicate national team as defined under FIFA eligibility rules; some limited exceptions apply. Players may hold more than one non-FIFA nationality.

No.	Pos.	Nation	Player
—	DF	UKR	Oleh Shevchenko (to FC Feniks-Illychovets Kalinine)
—	DF	UKR	Artur Hrytsenko

==== FC Zirka Kirovohrad ====
In: Note: Flags indicate national team as defined under FIFA eligibility rules; some limited exceptions apply. Players may hold more than one non-FIFA nationality.

No.	Pos.	Nation	Player
10	FW	UKR	Oleksandr Zgura (from FC Dniester Ovidiopol)
1	GK	UKR	Maksym Kuchenskyy (on loan from Metalurh-2 Zaporizhzhia)
—	MF	UKR	Andriy Maliuk (on loan from FC Metalurh Zaporizhzhia)
3	MF	UKR	Maksym Skorokhodov (on loan from FC Metalurh Zaporizhzhia)
11	FW	UKR	Ruslan Borsh (on loan from FC Metalurh Zaporizhzhia)
24	?	UKR	Ihor Chernomor (from FC Besiktas Chisinau)

Out: Note: Flags indicate national team as defined under FIFA eligibility rules; some limited exceptions apply. Players may hold more than one non-FIFA nationality.

No.	Pos.	Nation	Player

== See also ==
- Ukrainian Premier League 2008-09
- Ukrainian First League 2008-09
- Ukrainian Second League 2008-09
- List of Ukrainian football transfers winter 2008–09
