= 2007–08 Ukrainian Cup =

Kubok Ukrainy

Tournament details
- Country: Ukraine
- Dates: 20 July 2007 – 7 May 2008; 20 July – 8 August 2007 (qualification rounds); 24 September 2007 – 7 May 2008 (main event)
- Teams: 54

Final positions
- Champions: Shakhtar Donetsk (6th title)
- Runners-up: Dynamo Kyiv
- Semifinalists: Chornomorets Odesa; Metalurh Donetsk

Tournament statistics
- Top goal scorer: (Belarus) Uladzimir Karytska (5)

The 2007–08 Ukrainian Cup was the 17th annual edition of Ukraine's football knockout competition, the Ukrainian Cup.

The Cup started with the round of 32, but it also had couple of preliminaries. In the Ukrainian Second League, neither FC Arsenal Bila Tserkva nor FC Nyva-Svitanok Vinnytsia submitted their licenses to take part in this year's competition.

== Team allocation ==
Fifty-four teams entered the competition

=== Distribution ===
	Teams entering in this round	Teams advancing from previous round
First qualifying round (14 teams)	13 participants of the Second League (lower seeded); 1 participant of the Amateur Cup winner (Halychyna Lviv)	
Second qualifying round (28 teams)	17 participants of the First League (lower seeded); 4 participants of the Second League (higher seeded)	7 winners from the first qualifying round
Tournament proper (32 teams)	16 participants of the Premier League; 2 participants of the First League (higher seeded)	14 winners from the second qualifying round

=== Round and draw dates ===
All draws held at FFU headquarters (Building of Football) in Kyiv unless stated otherwise.

Phase	Round	Draw date	Game date	
Phase	Round	Draw date	First leg	Second leg
Qualifying	First qualifying round	?	20 July 2007	
Qualifying	Second qualifying round	25 July 2007	5,8 August 2007	
Main event	Round of 32	?	24–26 September 2007	
Main event	Round of 16	?	31 October 2007	
Main event	Quarter-finals	?	December 2007	December 2007
Main event	Semi-finals	?	19 March 2008	16 April 2008
Main event	Final	7 May 2008 at Metalist Stadium, Kharkiv		

== Competition schedule ==
=== First preliminary round ===
The matches of the First Preliminary Round took place on July 20, 2007.

"Nafkom"(Brovary) (2L)	5:0	(2L) "Olimpik"(Kirovohrad)
Halychyna (Lviv) (AM)	3:2	(2L) "Enerhiya"(Yuzhnoukrainsk)	aet
"Kremin"(Kremenchuk) (2L)	1:0	(2L) "Podillya-Khmelnytskyi"(Khmelnytskyi)
"Olimpik"(Donetsk) (2L)	3:2	(2L) "Shakhtar"(Sverdlovsk)	aet
"Khimik"(Krasnoperekopsk) (2L)	0:2	(2L) "OLKOM"(Melitopol)
"Arsenal"(Kharkiv) (2L)	4:0	(2L) "Komunalnyk"(Luhansk)
Hirnyk-Sport(Komsomolsk) (2L)	4:0	(2L) "Hazovyk-KHV"(Kharkiv)

=== Second preliminary round ===
The matches of the Second Preliminary Round took place on August 8, 2007, except the match of FC Halychyna Lviv and PFC Olexandria which took place on August 5.

The teams FC Stal Alchevsk and FC Illychivets Mariupol made it straight to the First Elimination Round, because the Alchevsk and Mariupol clubs rank the highest among the other First League participants.

Halychyna (Lviv)	0:1	"Oleksandria"
"Dnister"(Ovidiopol)	1:1	"Krymteplytsia"(Molodizhne)	aet, pk 3:1
"Titan"(Armyansk)	2:1	"CSKA"(Kyiv)
"Kniazha"(Schaslyve)	1:0	"OLKOM"(Melitopol)
"Nyva"(Ternopil)	2:0	"Feniks-Illychivets"(Kalynine)
"Nafkom"(Brovary)	0:2	"Sevastopol"
Lviv	3:0	"Prykarpattia"(Ivano-Frankivsk)
"Helios"(Kharkiv)	2:2	"Stal"(Dniprodzerzhynsk)	aet, pk 3:0
"Enerhetyk"(Burshtyn)	4:2	"Volyn"(Lutsk)	aet
"Olimpik"(Donetsk)	2:1	"Hirnyk-Sport"(Komsomolsk)	aet
"Yednist"(Plysky)	3:3	"Kremin"(Kremenchuk)	aet, pk 3:2
"Desna"(Chernihiv)	0:0	"Dnipro"(Cherkasy)	aet, pk 6:5
"Ihroservis"(Simferopol)	3:1	"Obolon"(Kyiv)
"Arsenal"(Kharkiv)	1:2	"Mykolaiv"

=== Bracket ===
Round of 32
MFK Mykolaiv	0
Shakhtar Donetsk	1
Helios Kharkiv	0
Arsenal Kyiv	2
Dniester Ovidiopol	2
Enerhetyk Burshtyn	0
Vorskla Poltava	2
FC Kharkiv	0
Tytan Armyansk	0
Chornomorets	3
PFC Sevastopol	1
Metalist Kharkiv	3
Knyazha Schaslyve	0
Illichivets Mariupol	1
FC Lviv	2
Zakarpattia Uzhhorod	1
Olimpik Donetsk	1
Desna Chernihiv	2
Naftovyk Okhtyrka	2
Zorya Luhansk	1
Yednist' Plysky	0
Stal Alchevsk	3
PFC Oleksandria	1
Metalurh Donetsk	2
Metalurh Zaporizhia	0
Tavriya Simferopol	1
Nyva Ternopil	1
Kryvbas Kryvyi Rih	0
Ihroservice	1
Karpaty Lviv	0
Dynamo Kyiv	2
Dnipro	0

Round of 16
Shakhtar Donetsk	4
Arsenal Kyiv	1
Dniester Ovidiopol	0
Vorskla Poltava	1
Chornomorets(p)	2
Metalist Kharkiv	2
FC Lviv	1
Illichivets Mariupol	2
Desna Chernihiv	1
Naftovyk Okhtyrka(p)	1
Stal Alchevsk	1
Metalurh Donetsk	2
Nyva Ternopil	0
Tavriya Simferopol(p)	0
Ihroservice	1
Dynamo Kyiv	4

Quarter-finals
Vorskla Poltava	1
Shakhtar Donetsk	4
Illichivets Mariupol	2
Chornomorets	5
Naftovyk Okhtyrka	2
Metalurh Donetsk	4
Tavriya Simferopol	2
Dynamo Kyiv	3

Semi-finals
Chornomorets	1
Shakhtar Donetsk	5
Dynamo Kyiv	3
Metalurh Donetsk	1

Final
Shakhtar Donetsk	2
Dynamo Kyiv	0

=== Round of 32 ===
In this round entered all 16 teams from Premier League. They were drawn against the 16 winners from the previous round, who played home in this round. The matches were played on September 24–26, 2007.

24 September 2007
16:00 LST

Dnister Ovidiopol (1L)	2–0	(1L) Enerhetyk Burshtyn
Zghura 26'; Hilazyev 83'; Zghura (penalty missed) 90'	Report

Dnister Stadium, Ovidiopol
Attendance: 1,000
Referee: Anatoliy Abdula (Kharkiv)

25 September 2007
17:00 LST

Naftovyk Okhtyrka (PL)	2–0	(PL) Zorya Luhansk
Tsimakuridze 15' (o.g.); Karakevych 35'	Report

Naftovyk Stadium, Okhtyrka
Attendance: 3,500
Referee: Viktor Shvetsov (Odesa)

25 September 2007
17:30 LST

Oleksandria (1L)	1 – 2 aet	(PL) Metalurh Donetsk
Honchar 73'	Report	Mendoza 4'; Cruyff 105+1'

Nika Stadium, Oleksandria
Attendance: 2,000
Referee: Oleksandr Derdo (Odesa)

26 September 2007
15:00 LST

Olimpik Donetsk (2L)	1–2	(1L) Desna Chernihiv
Arefyev 64'	Report	Kolodin 56'; Matkevych 75'

Olimpik Stadium, Donetsk
Attendance: 400
Referee: Yevhen Aranovsky (Kyiv)

26 September 2007
16:00 LST

Ihroservice Simferopol (1L)	1–0	(PL) Karpaty Lviv
Nalepa 7' (o.g.); Yakymenko (penalty missed) 71'	Report

Fiolent Stadium, Simferopol
Attendance: 2,000
Referee: Volodymyr Topikha (Kyiv)

26 September 2007
19:00 LST

Metalurh Zaporizhia (PL)	0 – 1 aet	(PL) Tavriya Simferopol
	Report	Halyuza 94'

Slavutych Arena, Zaporizhia
Attendance: 5,000
Referee: Yevhen Venher (Kyiv)

26 September 2007
16:00 LST

Nyva Ternopil (2L)	1–0	(PL) Kryvbas Kryvyi Rih
Draholyuk 8'	Report

City Stadium, Ternopil
Attendance: 6,200
Referee: Yuriy Moseichuk (Chernivtsi)

26 September 2007
16:00 LST

Sevastopol (2L)	1–3	(PL) Metalist Kharkiv
Shevchuk 22'	Report	Jakobia 29'; Nwoha 55'; Zézé 57'

SC Sevastopol, Sevastopol
Attendance: 4,800
Referee: Anatoliy Zhosan (Kherson)

26 September 2007
18:00 LST

Vorskla Poltava (PL)	2–0	(PL) Kharkiv
Shvets 45'; Đuričić 62'	Report

Vorskla Stadium, Poltava
Attendance: 3,500
Referee: Oleh Zubarev (Sloviansk)

26 September 2007
15:30 LST

Titan Armyansk (2L)	0–3	(PL) Chornomorets Odesa
	Report	Mello 34'; Karytska 46' (pen.), 73'; Shandruk (red card) 85'

Khimik Stadium, Armyansk
Attendance: 3,500
Referee: Oleh Derevinsky (Kyiv)

26 September 2007
19:00 LST

Dynamo Kyiv (PL)	2–0	(PL) Dnipro Dnipropetrovsk
Shatskikh 17', 69'	Report

Dynamo Stadium, Kyiv
Attendance: 8,200
Referee: Yevhen Abrosymov (Bilhorod-Dnistrovsky Raion)

26 September 2007
15:00 LST

FC Lviv (1L)	2–1	(PL) Zakarpattia Uzhhorod
B.Baranets 22' (pen.); H.Baranets 80'	Report	Bundash 55'

Knyazha Arena, Dobromyl
Attendance: 2,500
Referee: Yevhen Herenda (Kalush)

26 September 2007
15:30 LST

Helios Kharkiv (1L)	0–2	(PL) Arsenal Kyiv
	Report	Demetradze 25' dos Santos Silva 63'

Dynamo Stadium, Kharkiv
Attendance: 1,500
Referee: Vitaliy Hodulyan (Odesa)

26 September 2007
15:00 LST

Kniazha Schaslyve (2L)	0–1	(1L) Illichivets Mariupol
	Report	Lima de Moura 34'

Kolos Stadium, Boryspil
Attendance: 1,500
Referee: Yuriy Mozharovsky (Lviv)

26 September 2007
16:00 LST

Yednist Plysky (2L)	0–3	(1L) Stal Alchevsk
	Report	Mostovyi 27'; Okana-Stazi 47'; Kozlov 76'

Yednist Stadium, Plysky
Attendance: 1,000
Referee: Yuriy Hrysio (Lviv)

26 September 2007
15:00 LST

MFK Mykolaiv (1L)	0–1	(PL) Shakhtar Donetsk
	Report	Jádson 65' (pen.)

Central Stadium, Mykolaiv
Attendance: 20,000
Referee: Viktor Denysiuk (Fastiv)

=== Round of 16 ===
The Second Elimination Round of the Ukrainian Cup consisted of 16 competitors and took place on October 31, 2007.

31 October 2007
18:30 LST

Desna Chernihiv (1L)	1–1 (a.e.t.)	(PL) Naftovyk Okhtyrka
Yermolenko 33' (pen.)	Report	Kotenko 57'
Penalties
	3–5

Gagarin Stadium, Chernihiv
Attendance: 8,000
Referee: Oleksandr Derdo (Odesa)

31 October 2007
17:00 LST

Stal Alchevsk (1L)	1–2	(PL) Metalurh Donetsk
Toty 35'	Report	Bulut 45'; Vogt 77'

Stal Stadium, Alchevsk
Attendance: 4,500
Referee: Serhiy Berezka (Kyiv)

31 October 2007
14:00 LST

Ihroservice Simferopol (1L)	1–4	(PL) Dynamo Kyiv
Volodymyr Martynov 54'	Report	Shatskikh 6'; Corrêa 7'; Bangoura 15'; Ghioane 90'

Fiolent Stadium, Simferopol
Attendance: 4,000
Referee: Yevhen Herenda (Kalush)

31 October 2007
13:30 LST

Dnister Ovidiopol (1L)	0–1	(PL) Vorskla Poltava
	Report	Grumić 44'

Dnister Stadium, Ovidiopol
Attendance: 1,700
Referee: Oleh Oriekhov (Kyiv)

31 October 2007
14:00 LST

Nyva Ternopil (2L)	0–0 (a.e.t.)	(PL) Tavriya Simferopol
	Report
Penalties
	5–6

City Stadium, Ternopil
Attendance: 8,100
Referee: Serhiy Shebek (Kyiv)

31 October 2007
14:00 LST

FC Lviv (1L)	1–2	(1L) Illichivets Mariupol
Teplyi 16'	Report	Buryak 69'; Ivashko 81'

Knyazha Arena, Dobromyl
Attendance: 2,200
Referee: Serhiy Zadiran (Dnipropetrovsk)

31 October 2007
19:00 LST

Shakhtar Donetsk (PL)	4–1	(PL) Arsenal Kyiv
Hübschman 3'; Brandão 13'; Willian 60'; Jádson 69'	Report	Essola 44'

RSC Olimpiyskiy, Donetsk
Attendance: 18,000
Referee: Vitaliy Hodulyan (Odesa)

31 October 2007
18:00 LST

Chornomorets Odesa (PL)	2–2 (a.e.t.)	(PL) Metalist Kharkiv
Vázquez 45'; Biletskyi 56'; Humenyuk (red card) 60'	Report	Zézé 10'; Devich 47'
Penalties
	3–1

Chornomorets Stadium, Odesa
Attendance: 6,000
Referee: Oleh Zubarev (Sloviansk)

=== Quarterfinals ===
Team 1	Agg.	Team 2	1st leg	2nd leg
FC Naftovyk Okhtyrka	2–4	FC Metalurh Donetsk	2–3	0–1
SC Tavriya Simferopol	2–3	FC Dynamo Kyiv	2–0	0–3
FC Vorskla Poltava	1–4	FC Shakhtar Donetsk	0–3	1–1
FC Illichivets Mariupol	2–5	FC Chornomorets Odesa	2–1	0–4

==== First leg ====
The Quarterfinals consist of two matches per pair of club. The games took place from November 17 to January 15, 2007.

17 November 2007
15:00 LST

Naftovyk Okhtyrka (PL)	2–3	(PL) Metalurh Donetsk
Karakevych 3' (pen.); Ivanov 37'	Report	Kosyrin 38', 73' (pen.); Mitu 66'

Naftovyk Stadium, Okhtyrka
Attendance: 4,000
Referee: Oleh Derevinsky (Kyiv)

5 December 2007
18:00 LST

Tavriya Simferopol (PL)	2–0	(PL) Dynamo Kyiv
Jokšas 26'; Zborovskyi 90+2'	Report

Lokomotyv Stadium, Simferopol
Attendance: 8,000
Referee: Frank De Bleeckere (Belgium)

8 December 2007
14:00 LST

Vorskla Poltava (PL)	0–3	(PL) Shakhtar Donetsk
Chyzhov (yellow card) 26' (red card) 76'	Report	Chyhrynskyi 55'; Raț 77' (pen.); Fernandinho 88'

Vorskla Stadium, Poltava
Attendance: 4,500
Referee: Orest Shmyhelsky (Lviv)

9 December 2007
14:00 LST

Illichivets Mariupol (1L)	2–1	(PL) Chornomorets Odesa
Lima 43'; Krasnopyorov 48'	Report	Vázquez 45+2'

Illichivets Stadium, Mariupol
Attendance: 9,000
Referee: Andriy Shandor (Lviv)

==== Second leg ====
5 December 2007
16:00 LST

Metalurh Donetsk (PL)	1–0	(PL) Naftovyk Okhtyrka
Havrysh 22'	Report

Shakhtar Stadium, Donetsk
Attendance: 1,000
Referee: Yevhen Herenda (Kalush)

Metalurh Donetsk won 4–2 on aggregate.

8 December 2007
14:00 LST

Dynamo Kyiv (PL)	3–0	(PL) Tavriya Simferopol
Bangoura 2', 48' (pen.); Husyev 39'	Report

Dynamo Stadium, Kyiv
Attendance: 3,500
Referee: Ihor Podushkin (Kharkiv)

Dynamo Kyiv won 3–2 on aggregate.

12 December 2007
16:00 LST

Shakhtar Donetsk (PL)	1–1	(PL) Vorskla Poltava
Hai 55'	Report	Donets (red card) 28'; Curri 64'

Olympic Stadium, Donetsk
Attendance: 3,000
Referee: Yuriy Moseichuk (Chernivtsi)

Shakhtar Donetsk won 4–1 on aggregate.

15 December 2007
18:00 LST

Chornomorets Odesa (PL)	4–0	(1L) Illichivets Mariupol
Biletskyi 46'; Karytska 76' (pen.), 90'; Mello 82'	Report

Chornomorets Stadium, Odesa
Attendance: 3,500
Referee: Oleh Derevinsky (Kyiv)

Chornomorets Odesa won 5–2 on aggregate.

=== Semifinals (1/2) ===
The Semifinals took place on March 19 and April 16, 2008.

Team 1	Agg.	Team 2	1st leg	2nd leg
FC Chornomorets Odesa	1–5	FC Shakhtar Donetsk	1–2	0–3
FC Dynamo Kyiv	3–1	FC Metalurh Donetsk	2–1	1–0

==== First leg ====
19 March 2008
18:00 LST

Chornomorets Odesa (PL)	1–2	(PL) Shakhtar Donetsk
Karytska 72' (pen.)	Report	Lewandowski 41'; Brandão 64' (pen.)

Chornomorets Stadium, Odesa
Attendance: 14,000
Referee: Serhiy Shebek (Kyiv)

19 March 2008
19:00 LST

Dynamo Kyiv (PL)	2–1	(PL) Metalurh Donetsk
Husyev 43'; Aliyev 88'	Report	Kosyrin 55'

Dynamo Stadium, Kyiv
Attendance: 10,000
Referee: Tom Henning Øvrebø (Norway)

==== Second leg ====
16 April 2008
19:00 LST

Shakhtar Donetsk (PL)	3–0	(PL) Chornomorets Odesa
Luiz Adriano 4'; Kravchenko 72'; Duljaj 74'	Report

Olympic Stadium, Donetsk
Attendance: 17,000
Referee: Ihor Podushkin (Kharkiv)

Shakhtar Donetsk won 5–1 on aggregate.

16 October 2008
18:00 LST

(PL) Metalurh Donetsk	0–1	(PL) Dynamo Kyiv
	Report	Ghioane 68'

Shakhtar Stadium, Donetsk
Attendance: 11,000
Referee: Lucílio Batista (Portugal)

Dynamo Kyiv won 3–1 on aggregate.

== Final ==
7 May 2008
19:00 LST

Shakhtar Donetsk	2–0	Dynamo Kyiv
Hladkyy 44', (yellow card) 57' (yellow-red card) 87'; Brandão (red card) 64'; Hai 78'; Yezerskiy (red card) 80'	(Report)	Diakhaté (red card) 73'; Bangoura (red card) 80'

Metalist Stadium, Kharkiv
Attendance: 28000
Referee: Viktor Shvetsov

== Top goalscorers ==
The top scorers in the 2007–08 Ukrainian Cup are as follows:

Scorer	Goals	Team
(Belarus) Uladzimir Karytska	5	Chornomorets Odesa
(Ukraine) Oleksandr Kosyrin	3	Metalurh Donetsk
(Guinea) Ismaël Bangoura	3	Dynamo Kyiv
(Uzbekistan) Maksim Shatskikh	3	Dynamo Kyiv
(Ukraine) Viktor Arefyev	3	FC Olimpik Donetsk
(Ukraine) Hryhoriy Baranets	3	FC Lviv

== See also ==
- 2007–08 Ukrainian Premier League
