= Karabin (surname) =

Karabin is a surname. Notable people with the surname include:

- Dan Karabin (born 1955), wrestler who competed for Czechoslovakia
- Ladislav Karabin (born 1970), Slovak ice hockey player
- Taras Karabin (born 1989), Ukrainian football player
- Yaroslav Karabin (born 2002), Ukrainian football player

== See also ==
- Karabin, the fourth studio album by Polish singer Maria Peszek, released in 2016
- Karabičane
- Karambaini
- Karrabina
