= Pivnenko =

Pivnenko is a Ukrainian surname. Notable people with the surname include:

- Oleksandr Pivnenko (born 1986), Ukrainian serviceman
- Serhiy Pivnenko (born 1984), Ukrainian footballer
- Valentina Pivnenko (born 1947), Russian politician
