= Buryak =

Buryak (Ukrainian, Russian: Буря́к) is a Russian, Ukrainian and Belarusian surname that may refer to:

- Borys Buryak (born 1953), Ukrainian painter
- Dmitry Buryak (born 1987), Russian sprinter
- Ihor Buryak (born 1983), Ukrainian footballer
- Leonid Buryak (born 1953), Soviet and Ukrainian footballer and coach
- Zoya Buryak (born 1966), Russian actress
- Olena Buryak (born 1988), Ukrainian rower
