= Limuru =

- Location in Kenya
- Coordinates: 01°06′28″S 36°38′34″E
- Country: Kenya
- County: Kiambu County

Population (2019 Estimate)
  - Total: 159'314
- Time zone: UTC+3 (EAT)
- Climate: Cfb

Limuru is a town in central Kenya. It serves as both a parliamentary constituency and an administrative division. As of 2004, the town's population was approximately 4,800, which significantly increased to 159,314 by the 2019 census.

== Location ==
Limuru is a town located on the eastern edge of the Great Rift Valley about 30 kilometres (19 mi), by road, northwest of Nairobi. The geographical coordinates of Limuru town are:1°06'28.0"S, 36°38'34.0"E (Latitude:-1.107778; Longitude:36.642778).

== History ==
The native language of most people in Limuru is Kikuyu, with Swahili and English also widely used.

Historically, Limuru served as the capital of Kiambu West District, which was part of the larger Kiambu District. It is now a sub county in Kiambu County and also the name of a parliament constituency.

Limuru encompasses areas previously known as the "white highlands," a rich agricultural land south of the equator. The term "white highlands" derived from the British and other Europeans who realised the productive potential of this area and settled in large numbers with the support of the colonial government, establishing coffee and tea plantations, cereal farms and ranches. The town is at an altitude of about 2,500 meters and experiences temperatures of 10–28 °C (50-82°F) year round.

There is a railway station in Limuru town.

== Industry ==
Limuru is a key area of tea production and processing, with major factories such as Karirana Tea Estates and Mabroukie Teas Estates on the outskirts of the town.The tea plantations established around Limuru from 1903 onwards were the foundation of Kenya's tea industry.

The town is also home to the BATA shoe company, the largest shoe factory in East and Central Africa. In recent years, more companies have established themselves in the town, including Procter and Allan, polypipes and Fruit 'n' Juice.

The Nest Children's Home, which offers care services for children whose mothers are imprisoned, is located in Limuru town.

St. Paul's University has their main campus in Limuru. It was founded as St. Paul's Divinity School in 1903 and moved to Limuru in 1930. The university provides theological education and also offers degrees in a variety of other areas. As a seminary their Joshua and Timothy School of Theology is affiliated with the Anglican Church of Kenya, the Presbyterian Church of East Africa, and the Methodist Church in Kenya. St. Pauls's became a university in 2007.

Limuru has a rich history tied with the railway, the tea industry (especially with major expansion from the 1920s), and the Bata shoe factory and head office.

The town also serves as a milk processing zone obtained from the small-scale dairy farming in the surrounding area.

== People ==
Limuru residents rely mostly on farming and a shoe factory for employment. Early in the British colonial period (from the 1890s) Europeans settled in the area due to its proximity to Nairobi, the railway, its fertile land and pleasant weather. It is the birthplace of the African writer, Ngũgĩ wa Thiong'o, as well as that of Bishop Caesar Gatimu and human rights and political activist Percy Faith Fawaki (Zartaj).

== Health care ==
Limuru town is served by the government-run Limuru Health Center which is located within the town limits. Other health facilities serving Limuru residents include Rwamburi Dispensary, Rironi Dispensary, Thigio Dispensary, Ndeiya Health Center and Ngecha Health Center. Tigoni District Hospital is the main government hospital and serves as the link facility between the rural health facilities and the main National referral hospital. Health care has seen an improvement in quality of services with the collaboration of other stakeholders. Services such as cervical cancer screening by VIA/VILLI is available at all government run facilities in Limuru. The nurses working in these clinics also conduct outreach programs to ensure more women are screened. Uptake of long-term contraceptive methods such as implants and IUCDs has also improved due to intensive community education and outreach programs undertaken by the staff working in the various government health facilities. It is for this reason that Ndeiya Health Center was confirmed the center of excellence in addressing family planning and cervical cancer screening in East and Central Africa. Ndeiya Health Center has mentored other health facilities in the area including Rwamburi Dispensary with an aim of replicating the success in the same. Constituency development fund has funded the construction of three rural facilities in the area. These are: Rwamburi Dispensary, Rironi Dispensary and Ngecha Health Center. Also, there are several private hospitals in Limuru.

Community strategy has been implemented in the area and community units such as Ndiuni community unit has been conducting various community health activities. These community units are linked to their respective health facilities where they refer patients.

== Recent developments ==
Due to its proximity to Nairobi and its location on the main highway linking Nairobi to other towns like Naivasha, Eldoret and Kisumu, Limuru is attracting investors and businesses. In July 2014, developers of a new 11,000 square metres (120,000 ft^{2}) shopping mall broke ground. This was the first mall in the town. Tuskys, the number two supermarket chain in Kenya by sales, was the anchor tenant, taking up about 50% of the rental space. The development was expected to cost KSh650 million (approx. US$7.5 million) to construct, and to be ready during the second half of 2018. The number three supermarket chain in the country, Naivas together with Society Stores opened new stores in Limuru in 2016 and 2017 respectively. The new supermarkets joined others such as Cleanshelf, which was the major supermarket in the town as of January 2015. The Great Kenyan Bake Off, the Kenyan version of The Great British Bake Off, was filmed in Limuru.

== See also ==
- Karambaini
