= Volodymyr Korobka =

Ukrainian footballer

Personal information
- Full name: Volodymyr Hennadiyovych Korobka
- Date of birth: 22 July 1989 (age 37)
- Place of birth: Dnipropetrovsk, Ukrainian SSR
- Height: 1.84 m (6 ft 0 in)
- Position: Midfielder

Youth career
- 2002–2003: ISTA Dnipropetrovsk
- 2003–2006: Dnipro Dnipropetrovsk

Senior career*
Years	Team	Apps	(Gls)
2006–2008	Dnipro Dnipropetrovsk	0	(0)
2008–2013	Tavriya Simferopol	15	(2)
2012	→ Volgar Astrakhan (loan)	3	(0)
2013	Metalurh Zaporizhya	3	(0)
2013–2014	Tavriya Simferopol	29	(2)
2014	Tyumen	10	(2)
2015	Vitebsk	9	(1)
2016–2017	Kolkheti-1913 Poti	30	(3)
2017	Torpedo Kutaisi	13	(1)
2018	Volyn Lutsk	18	(0)
2019–2020	Inhulets Petrove	24	(0)
2020	Metalist 1925 Kharkiv	9	(0)
2021	Kramatorsk	13	(1)
- * Club domestic league appearances and goals as of 31 December 2021

Volodymyr Korobka (Ukrainian: Володимир Геннадійович Коробка; born 7 July 1989) is a Ukrainian former footballer.

== Career ==
He joined Tavriya in July 2008 during the summer transfer season. Korobka is the product of Dnipro youth school.

In January 2015 Korobka left FC Tyumen.
