= Dmytro Hordiyenko =

Ukrainian footballer

Personal information
- Full name: Dmytro Oleksandrovych Hordiyenko
- Date of birth: 2 March 1983 (age 43)
- Place of birth: Dnipropetrovsk, Ukrainian SSR, Soviet Union
- Height: 1.82 m (6 ft 0 in)
- Position: Forward

Senior career*
Years	Team	Apps	(Gls)
2002	FC LUKOR Kalush	2	(0)
2002	FC Prykarpattya Ivano-Frankivsk	2	(0)
2003–2004	FC Podillya Khmelnytskyi	39	(2)
2005–2006	FC Nafkom Brovary	38	(5)
2007–2008	FC Enerhetyk Burshtyn	35	(18)
2008–2009	FC Lviv	12	(1)
2009–2010	FC Enerhetyk Burshtyn	24	(5)
- * Club domestic league appearances and goals

Dmytro Oleksandrovych Hordiyenko (Ukrainian: Дмитро Олександрович Гордієнко; born 2 March 1983) is a professional Ukrainian football striker who played for FC Lviv in the Ukrainian Premier League. He moved to FC Lviv from Enerhetyk Burshtyn during the 2008 summer transfer season. Dymytro retired in 2008 finishing his career in the Ukrainian Premier League with a game against Shakhtar Donetsk on 21st November.
