= Yakiv Zalevskyi =

Ukrainian footballer and coach

Personal information
- Full name: Yakiv Anatoliyovych Zalevskyi
- Date of birth: 30 May 1980 (age 46)
- Place of birth: Volgograd, Soviet Union
- Height: 1.90 m (6 ft 3 in)
- Position: Midfielder

Team information
- Current team: Krumkachy Minsk

Senior career*
Years	Team	Apps	(Gls)
1997–1998	Energiya Kamyshin	24	(1)
1999–2000	Energhetic Dubăsari	17	(1)
2000–2001	Sheriff Tiraspol	2	(0)
2001–2002	Tiraspol	8	(2)
2003–2004	Palmira Odesa	13	(3)
2005–2006	Sakhalin Yuzhno-Sakhalinsk	33	(16)
2007–2008	Torpedo Zhodino	34	(4)
2008–2009	Dniester Ovidiopol	12	(0)
2010	Minsk	26	(0)
2011	Vitebsk	3	(0)
2011	Gomel	6	(0)
2012	Sakhalin Yuzhno-Sakhalinsk	10	(0)
2012	Dnepr Mogilev	9	(1)
2013	Granit Mikashevichi	11	(0)
2013	Isloch Minsk Raion	11	(0)
2014	Krumkachy Minsk	12	(2)

Managerial career
- 2015–: Krumkachy Minsk (assistant)
- 2016: Krumkachy Minsk (caretaker)
- * Club domestic league appearances and goals

Yakiv Anatoliyovych Zalevskyi (Ukrainian: Яків Анатолійович Залевський; born 30 May 1980) is a Ukrainian professional football coach and former player.
