= Parid Xhihani =

Albanian footballer

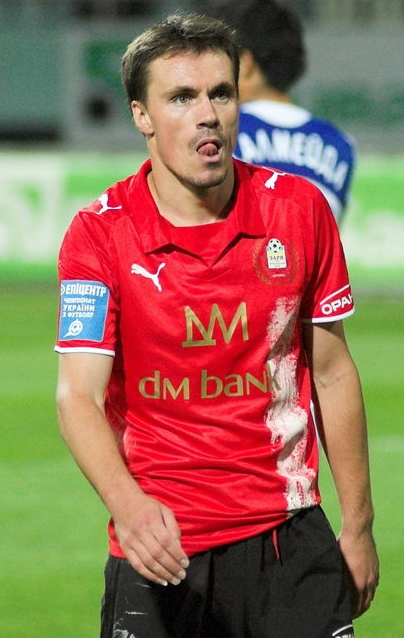

Personal information
- Date of birth: 18 July 1983 (age 43)
- Place of birth: Kavajë, Albania
- Height: 1.76 m (5 ft 9 in)
- Position: Midfielder

Youth career
- 1997–1998: Besa Kavajë

Senior career*
| Years | Team | Apps | (Gls) |
| 1998–2001 | Besa | 50 | (4) |
| 2001–2002 | Shkumbini | 20 | (5) |
| 2002–2003 | Besa | 22 | (6) |
| 2003–2005 | Dinamo Tirana | 45 | (6) |
| 2005–2006 | Teuta | 15 | (5) |
| 2006–2008 | Besa | 56 | (17) |
| 2008–2011 | Zorya Luhansk | 50 | (14) |
| 2011–2012 | Kastrioti | 20 | (2) |
| 2012–2013 | Besa | 10 | (0) |

International career
| 2004–2006 | Albania U21 | 8 | (7) |
| 2010 | Albania | 1 | (0) |
- * Club domestic league appearances and goals

Parid Xhihani (born 18 July 1983) is an Albanian retired professional footballer who last played as a midfielder for hometown club Besa Kavajë.

== Club career ==
During the 2008–09 summer transfer season, he transferred to Zorya in the Ukrainian Premier League from Albanian Premier League side Besa Kavajë. Xhihani was one of six player to sue their club, KS Kastrioti, for failing to pay their salaries in May 2012.

== International career ==
He made his debut for Albania in June 2010 friendly match against Andorra in Tirana, coming on as a second-half substitute for Jahmir Hyka. It proved to be his sole international game.
