= 2007–08 Vyshcha Liha =

17th season of top-tier football league in Vyshcha Liha

Vyshcha Liha
- Season: 2007–08
- Champions: Shakhtar Donetsk; 4th title
- Runner up: Dynamo Kyiv
- Relegated: Naftovyk-Ukrnafta Okhtyrka, Zakarpattia Uzhhorod
- Champions League: Shakhtar Donetsk (3rd Qualifying Round); Dynamo Kyiv (2nd Qualifying Round)
- UEFA Cup: Metalist Kharkiv (1st Round); Dnipro Dnipropetrovsk (2nd Qualifying Round)
- Intertoto Cup: Tavriya Simferopol (2nd Round)
- Matches: 240
- Goals: 581 (2.42 per match)
- Top goalscorer: Marko Dević (19) (Metalist Kharkiv)
- Biggest home win: Arsenal - Zakarpattia 7:0
- Biggest away win: numerous games 0:3 and 1:4
- Highest scoring: Dynamo - Karpaty 7:3

The 2007–08 Vyshcha Liha season was the seventeenth since its establishment. This season of the championship was sponsored by Biola which became the title sponsor replacing Soyuz-Viktan. The competition began on 17 July 2007 and ended on 18 May 2008. 16 teams participated in the competition, 14 of which contested in the 2006–07 season, and two of which (Zakarpattia Uzhhorod and Naftovyk-Ukrnafta Okhtyrka) were promoted from the Ukrainian First League (the league immediately below the Ukrainian Premier League). Dynamo Kyiv was the defending champions. Also, it was the last season of the top tier being part of the Professional Football League of Ukraine before separating into the Ukrainian Premier League and rebranding from Vyshcha Liha (Higher League).

The winner of the competition became Shakhtar Donetsk with 74 points, followed by Dynamo Kyiv with 71 points. Metalist, which placed right behind Shakhtar and Dynamo, had its awards stripped for match fixing. (Note: The court ruling however came later in 2013. No further sanctions were awarded to the club.) The top goalscorer of the season was Marko Dević from Metalist Kharkiv with 19 goals, 6 of which were penalties. The spot for the second highest goalscorer with 17 goals was a three-way tie between Oleksandr Hladky from Shakhtar Donetsk, Yevhen Seleznyov from Arsenal Kyiv (on loan from Shakhtar), and Oleksandr Kosyrin from Metalurh Donetsk.

== Teams ==
=== Promoted ===
Two teams were promoted from the 2006-07 Ukrainian First League.

- Naftovyk-Ukrnafta Okhtyrka, champion – (returning after absence of 15 seasons)
- Zakarpattya Uzhhorod, runner-up – (returning after absence of a seasons)

Naftovyk and Zakarpattia replaced Illichivets Mariupol (after a 10-year topflight spell) and Stal Alchevsk (a couple of seasons), both of which were relegated to the 2007-08 Ukrainian First League.

=== Location map ===
Locations of team home grounds in Ukrainian Premier League 2007–08

== Managers ==
Club	Coach	Replaced coach
Arsenal Kyiv	(Ukraine) Oleksandr Zavarov	
Chornomorets Odesa	(Russia) Vitaliy Shevchenko	
Dnipro Dnipropetrovsk	(Ukraine) Oleh Protasov	
Dynamo Kyiv	(Russia) Yuri Semin	(Ukraine) Anatoliy Demyanenko
Karpaty Lviv	(Ukraine) Valery Yaremchenko	(Ukraine) Oleksandr Ischenko
Kharkiv	(Ukraine) Volodymyr Bezsonov	
Kryvbas Kryvyi Rih	(Ukraine) Oleh Taran	
Metalist Kharkiv	(Ukraine) Myron Markevych	
Metalurh Donetsk	(Bulgaria) Nikolay Kostov	(Belgium) Jos Daerden
Metalurh Zaporizhzhia	(Ukraine) Anatoly Chantsev	
Naftovyk-Ukrnafta Okhtyrka	(Ukraine) Valeriy Horodov	(Ukraine) Serhiy Shevchenko (Ukraine) Viktor Ishchenko
Shakhtar Donetsk	(Romania) Mircea Lucescu	
Tavriya Simferopol	(Ukraine) Mykhailo Fomenko	
Vorskla Poltava	(Ukraine) Mykola Pavlov	(Ukraine) Anatoliy Momot
Zakarpattia Uzhhorod	(Ukraine) Volodymyr Vasiutyk	(Ukraine) Petro Kushlyk (Ukraine) Volodymyr Sharan
Zorya Luhansk	(Ukraine) Anatoliy Volobuev	(Ukraine) Oleksandr Kosevych

=== Managerial changes ===
Team	Outgoing head coach	Manner of departure	Date of vacancy	Table	Incoming head coach	Date of appointment	Table
Chornomorets					(Russia) Vitaliy Shevchenko	27 June 2007	Pre-season

== League table ==
Pos	Team	Pld	W	D	L	GF	GA	GD	Pts	Qualification or relegation
1	Shakhtar Donetsk (C)	30	24	2	4	75	24	+51	74	Qualification to Champions League third qualifying round
2	Dynamo Kyiv	30	22	5	3	65	26	+39	71	Qualification to Champions League second qualifying round
3	~~Metalist Kharkiv~~ (Note: Metalist Kharkiv was stripped of their bronze award for this season by the Court of Arbitration for Sport in Lausanne in August 2013 for fixing of the match Karpaty Lviv – Metalist (of 19 April 2008).)	30	19	6	5	51	27	+24	63	Qualification to UEFA Cup first round
4	Dnipro Dnipropetrovsk	30	18	5	7	40	27	+13	59	Qualification to UEFA Cup second qualifying round
5	Tavriya Simferopol	30	13	8	9	38	40	−2	47	Qualification to Intertoto Cup second round
6	Arsenal Kyiv	30	11	9	10	42	36	+6	42	
7	Chornomorets Odesa	30	11	5	14	27	33	−6	38	
8	Vorskla Poltava	30	9	9	12	28	30	−2	36	
9	Metalurh Zaporizhzhia	30	9	9	12	24	32	−8	36	
10	Karpaty Lviv	30	9	6	15	29	41	−12	33	
11	Zorya Luhansk	30	9	4	17	24	43	−19	31	
12	Metalurh Donetsk	30	6	13	11	34	39	−5	31	
13	Kryvbas Kryvyi Rih	30	7	9	14	29	39	−10	30	
14	FC Kharkiv	30	6	9	15	20	32	−12	27	
15	Naftovyk-Ukrnafta Okhtyrka (R)	30	6	8	16	18	38	−20	26	Relegation to the Ukrainian First League
16	Zakarpattia Uzhhorod (R)	30	3	9	18	17	54	−37	18	Relegation to the Ukrainian First League

Source: uafootball.net.ua
(C) Champions; (R) Relegated

== Results ==
Home \ Away	ARK	CHO	DNI	DYN	KAR	KHA	KRY	MET	MDO	MZA	NAF	SHA	TAV	VOR	ZAK	ZOR
Arsenal Kyiv	—	1–2	2–1	0–1	2–0	0–0	0–0	1–1	1–3	2–1	3–0	2–4	0–1	3–2	7–0	1–1
Chornomorets Odesa	0–1	—	1–2	0–0	4–0	0–1	1–1	0–1	1–0	1–1	0–1	1–2	2–0	1–0	3–1	1–0
Dnipro	1–3	1–0	—	0–4	0–0	1–0	2–0	3–0	4–1	1–0	2–0	1–3	2–1	1–0	0–0	1–0
Dynamo Kyiv	2–2	5–2	1–3	—	7–3	2–0	3–0	0–1	3–3	2–1	0–1	2–1	3–0	2–1	1–0	3–0
Karpaty Lviv	0–0	2–0	0–1	1–2	—	1–0	3–0	0–2	0–0	1–3	1–1	2–4	4–0	1–2	2–0	3–0
FC Kharkiv	2–0	1–1	1–2	0–1	1–0	—	0–0	0–2	1–1	0–1	1–0	0–3	1–1	0–3	0–2	0–1
Kryvbas Kryvyi Rih	0–0	3–0	1–2	0–1	0–1	1–1	—	0–3	1–1	0–1	0–1	1–0	1–1	3–0	1–1	1–2
Metalist Kharkiv	2–4	2–0	1–0	2–2	4–0	2–0	3–2	—	1–1	2–1	2–0	1–3	3–0	3–0	1–0	2–1
Metalurh Donetsk	1–2	0–0	0–3	1–2	1–0	0–0	0–1	1–1	—	3–0	2–1	0–1	1–2	0–0	5–0	1–0
Metalurh Zaporizhzhia	0–1	0–2	0–0	0–1	1–0	0–0	1–1	0–2	1–0	—	1–0	1–3	0–0	1–1	0–0	3–0
Naftovyk-Ukrnafta Okhtyrka	1–0	0–1	1–1	0–3	0–0	1–4	1–2	0–2	2–2	0–1	—	0–3	0–1	2–0	3–0	0–0
Shakhtar Donetsk	4–1	0–1	4–1	1–1	3–0	2–1	1–0	4–1	4–1	4–0	1–1	—	2–0	2–1	5–0	3–0
Tavriya Simferopol	1–1	3–0	0–1	1–4	2–1	1–0	4–3	0–0	3–3	2–2	1–0	3–2	—	1–0	4–1	2–0
Vorskla Poltava	2–1	2–0	2–1	0–1	0–0	1–1	2–1	1–1	2–0	2–1	1–1	0–1	0–0	—	2–0	1–1
Zakarpattia Uzhhorod	0–0	2–0	1–1	1–1	1–2	0–2	2–3	0–1	1–1	1–1	0–0	0–1	1–0	0–0	—	0–2
Zorya Luhansk	3–1	0–2	0–1	1–2	0–1	2–1	1–2	3–2	1–1	0–1	1–0	1–4	2–3	+:-	1–0	—

Source: uafootball.net.ua
Legend: Blue = home team win; Yellow = draw; Red = away team win.

== Top goalscorers ==
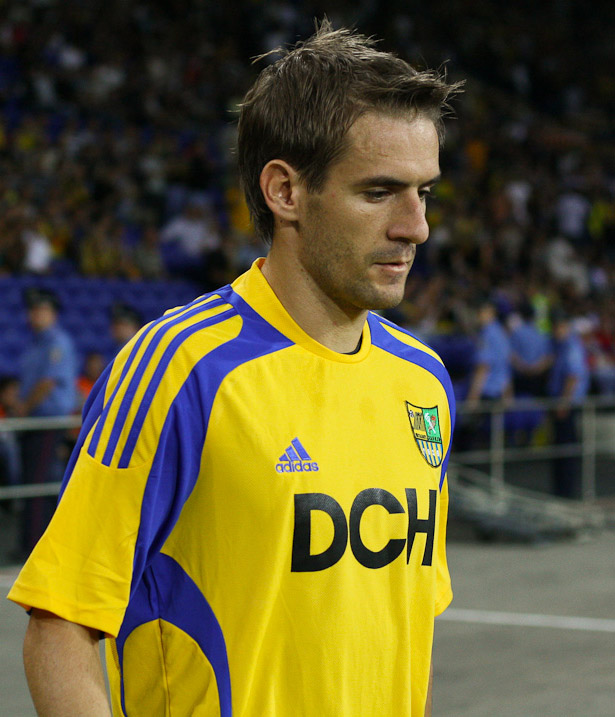
Marko Dević

Scorer	Goals	Team
(Serbia) Marko Dević	19	Metalist Kharkiv
(Ukraine) Oleksandr Hladky	17	Shakhtar Donetsk
(Ukraine) Oleksandr Kosyrin	17	Metalurh Donetsk
(Ukraine) Yevhen Seleznyov	17	Arsenal Kyiv
(Guinea) Ismaël Bangoura	15	Dynamo Kyiv
(Ukraine) Volodymyr Homenyuk	14	Tavriya Simferopol
(Brazil) Brandão	12	Shakhtar Donetsk
(Brazil) Fernandinho	11	Shakhtar Donetsk
(Uzbekistan) Maksim Shatskikh	10	Dynamo Kyiv
(Ukraine) Serhiy Nazarenko	9	Dnipro Dnipropetrovsk

== Stadia ==
The following stadiums were used as home grounds during the season:

Rank	Stadium	Capacity	Club	Notes
1	NSC Olimpiysky	83,450	Arsenal Kyiv	Played last 6 games
2	Chornomorets Stadium	34,362	Chornomorets Odesa	Annual venue for the Ukrainian Super Cup
3	Shakhtar Stadium	31,718	Metalurh Donetsk	
4	Metalurh Stadium	29,783	Kryvbas Kryvyi Rih	
5	Ukraina Stadium	28,051	Karpaty Lviv	Renovations are taking place
6	RSK Olimpiyskiy	25,831	Shakhtar Donetsk	
7	Vorskla Stadium	25,000	Vorskla Poltava	FC Kharkiv played against Dynamo and Zorya
8	Stadium Meteor	24,381	Dnipro Dnipropetrovsk	
9	Metalist Stadium	22,757	Metalist Kharkiv; FC Kharkiv	Temporarily in emergency conditions
10	Avanhard Stadium	22,320	Zorya Luhansk	
11	Lokomotiv Stadium	19,978	Tavriya Simferopol	
12	Lobanovsky Dynamo Stadium	16,873	Dynamo Kyiv; Arsenal Kyiv	FC Arsenal Kyiv its first 9 games here
13	Avanhard Stadium	12,000	Zakarpattia Uzhhorod	
14	Slavutych-Arena	11,983	Metalurh Zaporizhzhia	
15	Dynamo Stadium	6,000	Metalist Kharkiv; FC Kharkiv	Metalist played three games here including one against Kharkiv, Kharkiv played here its home game against Vorskla
16	Naftovyk Stadium	5,256	Naftovyk-Ukrnafta Okhtyrka	

== See also ==
- 2007–08 Ukrainian Cup
- 2007–08 Ukrainian First League
- 2007–08 Ukrainian Second League
