= Denys Sydorenko =

Ukrainian footballer

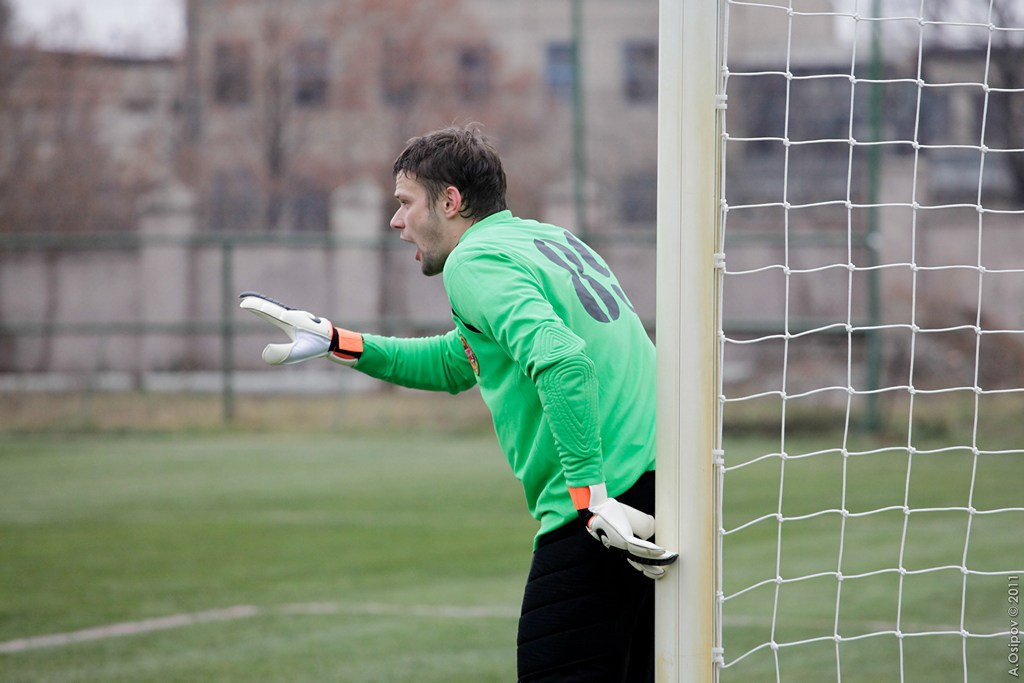

Personal information
- Full name: Denys Borysovych Sydorenko
- Date of birth: 18 April 1989 (age 37)
- Place of birth: Kharkiv, Ukrainian SSR, Soviet Union
- Height: 1.90 m (6 ft 3 in)
- Position: Goalkeeper

Team information
- Current team: Metalist 1925 Kharkiv
- Number: 1

Youth career
- 2002–2003: Krystal Parkhomivka
- 2003–2006: Metalist Kharkiv

Senior career*
Years	Team	Apps	(Gls)
2006–2011	Metalist Kharkiv	0	(0)
2008	→ Dniester Ovidiopol (loan)	13	(0)
2010	→ Tavriya Simferopol (loan)	0	(0)
2011–2014	Helios Kharkiv	73	(0)
2014–2016	Metalist Kharkiv	2	(0)
2016	→ Helios Kharkiv (loan)	10	(0)
2016–2018	Helios Kharkiv	48	(0)
2018–	Metalist 1925 Kharkiv	82	(0)

International career^{‡}
2006–2007	Ukraine U18	2	(0)
2007–2008	Ukraine U19	8	(0)
- * Club domestic league appearances and goals as of 20 June 2024 ‡ National team caps and goals as of 7 July 2018

Denys Borysovych Sydorenko (Ukrainian: Денис Борисович Сидоренко; born 18 April 1989) is a Ukrainian professional footballer who plays as a goalkeeper for Metalist 1925 Kharkiv in the Ukrainian Premier League.

== Career ==
He attended the Metalist Youth School system, from July 2008 to January 2009 and played 11 Games in the Perscha Liga for FC Dniester Ovidiopol on loan from Metalist.
