= Artem Savin =

Ukrainian footballer (born 1981)

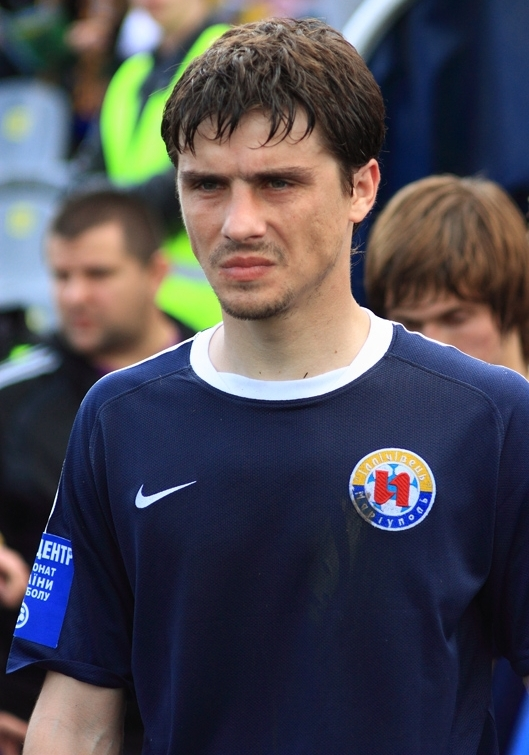

Personal information
- Full name: Artem Serhiyovych Savin
- Date of birth: 20 January 1981 (age 45)
- Place of birth: Voroshylovhrad, Ukrainian SSR (now Luhansk)
- Height: 1.79 m (5 ft 10 1/2 in)
- Position: Defender

Senior career*
Years	Team	Apps	(Gls)
1998	Avanhard Rovenky	9	(1)
1999–2006	Shakhtar Donetsk	0	(0)
2000–2003	→ Shakhtar-2 Donetsk	78	(5)
2000–2002	→ Shakhtar-3 Donetsk	16	(1)
2003	→ Metalurh Donetsk (loan)	1	(0)
2003	→ Metalurh-2 Donetsk (loan)	6	(0)
2004	→ Illichivets Mariupol (loan)	1	(0)
2004	→ Illichivets-2 Mariupol (loan)	6	(0)
2004	→ Oleksandriya (loan)	11	(0)
2005–2006	→ Shakhtar-2 Donetsk	14	(0)
2006	Kryvbas Kryvyi Rih	11	(0)
2007–2008	Zorya Luhansk	25	(0)
2008–2012	Illichivets Mariupol	69	(0)
2012	→ Illichivets-2 Mariupol	4	(0)
2012	Olimpik Donetsk	8	(0)
- * Club domestic league appearances and goals as of 8 July 2012

Artem Serhiyovych Savin (Ukrainian: Артем Сергійович Савін; born 20 January 1981) is a Ukrainian former professional footballer who played as a defender.

He was acquired from Zorya Luhansk during the 2008–09 transfer season.
