= Oleksandr Zotov =

Ukrainian footballer

Personal information
- Full name: Oleksandr Serhiyovych Zotov
- Date of birth: 23 February 1975 (age 51)
- Place of birth: Yenakiieve, Ukraine
- Height: 1.86 m (6 ft 1 in)
- Position: Midfielder

Team information
- Current team: Rukh Vynnyky (assistant)

Youth career
- UOR Donetsk

Senior career*
Years	Team	Apps	(Gls)
1992–1993	Silur Khartsyzk	32	(2)
1994	Metalurh Kostiantynivka	18	(1)
1994	SC Odesa	3	(0)
1995–1998	Chornomorets Odesa	92	(12)
1998–2001	Kryvbas Kryvyi Rih	59	(3)
2001	Vorskla Poltava	12	(2)
2001	→ Vorskla-2 Poltava	1	(0)
2001–2006	Metalurh Donetsk	114	(12)
2001–2002	→ Metalurh-2 Donetsk	3	(0)
2006–2008	Chornomorets Odesa	47	(1)
2008–2009	Metalurh Donetsk	19	(1)
2009	→ Zakarpattia Uzhhorod (loan)	8	(0)
2010	Feniks-Illichovets Kalinine	3	(0)
Total		411	(34)

International career
1996–1997	Ukraine U21	6	(0)
1996–2002	Ukraine	4	(0)

Managerial career
- 2010–2012: Metalurh Donetsk U14
- 2012–2015: Metalurh Donetsk U19
- 2016: Stal Kamianske U19
- 2016–2017: Stal Kamianske U21
- 2017: Veres Rivne (assistant)
- 2017: Veres Rivne (caretaker)
- 2018–: Rukh Vynnyky (assistant)
- * Club domestic league appearances and goals

Oleksandr Zotov (Ukrainian: Олександр Сергійович Зотов; born 23 February 1975) is a retired professional Ukrainian football midfielder.

== Career ==
Zotov is a product of UOR Donetsk. His professional debut, he made in lower leagues clubs from Donetsk Oblast where he played in 1992–1994. In 1994 Zotov moved to Odesa where he for short period played for the city team SC Odesa. In 1995 he debuted at Vyshcha Liha (Ukrainian Top League) playing for FC Chornomorets Odesa and later FC Kryvbas Kryvyi Rih.

In 2001 Zotov joined Metalurh Donetsk. Later he rejoined Metalurh Donetsk at the beginning of the 2008–09 from Chornomorets Odesa during the summer transfer season.
