= Artem Mostovyi =

Ukrainian footballer

Personal information
- Full name: Artem Mostovyi
- Date of birth: 5 October 1983 (age 43)
- Place of birth: Kyiv, Ukraine, Soviet Union
- Height: 1.80 m (5 ft 11 in)
- Position: Forward

Senior career*
Years	Team	Apps	(Gls)
2003	Bucha-KLO	8	(4)
2003–2006	Arsenal Kyiv	0	(0)
2003–2004	→ Arsenal-2 Kyiv	19	(7)
2006	Borysfen Boryspil	13	(5)
2007	Stal Alchevsk	18	(0)
2008	Dnipro Cherkasy	18	(6)
2008	Lviv	3	(0)
2008–2010	Desna Chernihiv	26	(4)
- * Club domestic league appearances and goals

Artem Mostovyi (born 5 October 1983) is a Ukrainian former professional football striker. He moved to FC Lviv from Stal Alchevsk during the 2008 summer transfer season. However, before the deadline of the 2008–09 season, Artem Mostovyi decided to move to Desna Chernihiv where he would get more playing time.
