= Valentin Nefyodov =

Russian footballer

Personal information
- Full name: Valentin Valentinovich Nefyodov
- Date of birth: 23 February 1982 (age 44)
- Place of birth: Moscow, Russian SFSR, Soviet Union
- Height: 1.85 m (6 ft 1 in)
- Position: Midfielder

Youth career
- 1999–2000: Nika Moscow

Senior career*
Years	Team	Apps	(Gls)
2001	Lokomotiv Nizhny Novgorod	11	(2)
2001	Arsenal Tula	5	(0)
2003	Uralan Plus Moscow	7	(1)
2003–2004	Chornomorets Odesa	5	(0)
2003–2004	→ Chornomorets-2 Odesa	15	(1)
2005	Mashuk-KMV Pyatigorsk	8	(1)
2006	Anzhi Makhachkala	31	(0)
2007	Zvezda Irkutsk	1	(0)
2007–2008	Naftovyk-Ukrnafta Okhtyrka	19	(0)
2008–2009	Illichivets Mariupol	20	(0)
2012–2013	Dolgoprudny	35	(2)
- * Club domestic league appearances and goals

Valentin Valentinovich Nefyodov (Russian: Валентин Валентинович Нефёдов; born 23 February 1982) is a former Russian football midfielder.

== Club career ==
He made his Russian Football National League debut for FC Lokomotiv Nizhny Novgorod on 2 May 2001 in a game against FC Khimki. Overall, he played 3 seasons in the FNL for Lokomotiv, FC Arsenal Tula, FC Anzhi Makhachkala and FC Zvezda Irkutsk.

He also played 3 seasons in the Ukrainian Premier League for FC Chornomorets Odesa, Naftovyk and FC Illichivets Mariupol.
