= Alejandro Mello =

Uruguayan footballer (born 1979)

Personal information
- Full name: Álvaro Alejandro Melo Silvera
- Date of birth: May 13, 1979 (age 47)
- Place of birth: Montevideo, Uruguay
- Height: 1.83 m (6 ft 0 in)
- Position: Forward

Youth career
- Nacional

Senior career*
| Years | Team | Apps | (Gls) |
| 1999–2001 | Nacional | | |
| 2001–2002 | River Plate Montevideo | 39 | (20) |
| 2003–2004 | Nacional | 18 | (2) |
| 2004 | Shanghai Shenhua | | |
| 2004–2005 | Tacuarembó FC | 8 | (6) |
| 2005 | Olimpo de Bahía Blanca | 14 | (1) |
| 2005–2006 | Rentistas | 14 | (9) |
| 2006–2007 | River Plate Montevideo | 11 | (2) |
| 2007 | Atlético Bucaramanga | 11 | (1) |
| 2007–2010 | FC Chornomorets Odesa | 34 | (5) |
| 2010 | Cerro | 20 | (7) |
| 2011 | Sportivo Luqueño | 7 | (0) |
| 2011–2012 | Danubio | 22 | (4) |
| 2012–2014 | El Tanque Sisley | 37 | (11) |
| 2014–2015 | Villa Teresa | 29 | (11) |
| 2015–2016 | Deportivo Maldonado | 14 | (1) |
- * Club domestic league appearances and goals

Álvaro Alejandro Melo Silvera (born May 13, 1979) is a Uruguayan footballer who plays as a forward. He has played for Uruguayan clubs Nacional, River Plate, Tacuarembó, Rentistas, Cerro, Danubio, El Tanque Sisley, Villa Teresa and Deportivo Maldonado, in China for Shanghai Shenhua, for Argentine club Olimpo de Bahía Blanca, for Colombian club Bucaramanga, for Ukrainian club FC Chornomorets Odesa and for Sportivo Luqueño of Paraguay.

== Titles ==
- Nacional 2000 (Uruguayan Primera División Championship)
