= Ruslan Bidnenko =

Ukrainian footballer (born 1981)

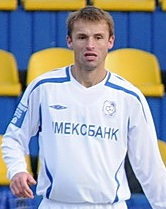

Personal information
- Full name: Ruslan Mykhaylovych Bidnenko
- Date of birth: 20 July 1981 (age 45)
- Place of birth: Revne, Boryspil Raion, Ukrainian SSR, Soviet Union
- Height: 1.85 m (6 ft 1 in)
- Position: Midfielder

Youth career
- Borysfen Boryspil

Senior career*
Years	Team	Apps	(Gls)
1997–2003	Borysfen Boryspil	166	(27)
2002	→ Borysfen-2 Boryspil	1	(0)
2004	Dynamo Kyiv	12	(0)
2004	→ Dynamo-2 Kyiv	3	(1)
2005–2009	Dnipro Dnipropetrovsk	16	(0)
2008	→ Naftovyk Okhtyrka (loan)	18	(1)
2009–2010	Chornomorets Odesa	11	(0)
2010–2011	Zirka Kirovohrad	11	(0)
2011	Vostok	15	(0)
2012	Okzhetpes	4	(0)
2012	Poltava	11	(1)

International career
2004	Ukraine	1	(0)

Managerial career
- 2016: FC Zirka Kropyvnytskyi U-19
- 2016–2017: FC Zirka Kropyvnytskyi U-21
- * Club domestic league appearances and goals

Ruslan Mykhaylovych Bidnenko (born 20 July 1981) is a retired professional Ukrainian footballer. He has played once for the Ukraine national football team. He mainly plays as a midfielder.

== Career ==
=== Club career ===
Bidnenko started his career with hometown club FC Borysfen Boryspil in 1997 and played over 160 games before a transfer to Dynamo Kyiv in 2003. Restricted to only twelve appearances in one and a half seasons, he joined FC Dnipro Dnipropetrovsk in 2004. After making 18 appearances due to injuries he was sent on loan to FC Naftovyk Okhtyrka until the end of the 2007–08 season. In 2009, he was loaned to Arsenal Kyiv. On 17 October 2009, he signed a deal with FC Chornomorets Odesa until the end of the 2009–10 season. He has been a Ukrainian Premier League champion in 2003–04, and a runner-up and Ukrainian Cup winner in 2004–05.

=== International career ===
He has appeared only in one game for the senior team when in away friendly against France in Saint Denis at Stade de France Bidenko came out on substitution for Mykhailo Starostyak.

== Honours ==
- Ukrainian Premier League champion: 2003–04
- Ukrainian Premier League third: 2004–05
- Ukrainian Cup champion: 2004–05
