= Vsevolod Romanenko =

Ukrainian footballer (born 1977)

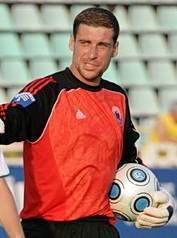

Personal information
- Full name: Vsevolod Romanenko
- Date of birth: 24 March 1977 (age 49)
- Place of birth: Kyiv, Ukrainian SSR, Soviet Union
- Height: 1.91 m (6 ft 3 in)
- Position: Goalkeeper

Youth career
- Dynamo Kyiv

Senior career*
Years	Team	Apps	(Gls)
1993–2000	Dynamo Kyiv	0	(0)
1993–1999	→ Dynamo-3 Kyiv	90	(0)
1997	→ Obolon Kyiv (loan)	14	(0)
1997–2000	→ Dynamo-2 Kyiv	5	(0)
2000–2001	Tavriya Simferopol	24	(0)
2001	Zakarpattia Uzhhorod	2	(0)
2001	→ Zakarpattia-2 Uzhhorod	3	(0)
2002	Prykarpattya Ivano-Frankivsk	17	(0)
2002–2005	Obolon Kyiv	64	(0)
2005–2007	Volyn Lutsk	37	(0)
2007–2008	Zakarpattia Uzhhorod	5	(0)
2008–2009	Karpaty Lviv	29	(0)
2009–2011	Illichivets Mariupol	36	(0)
2011	Prykarpattya Ivano-Frankivsk	3	(0)
2011–2012	Volyn Lutsk	6	(0)
2012	Poltava	18	(0)
2013	Bucha		
2014	Putrivka		
2015	Dinaz Vyshhorod		
- * Club domestic league appearances and goals

Vsevolod Romanenko (born 24 March 1977) is a Ukrainian former professional footballer.
