= Oleh Karamushka =

Ukrainian footballer

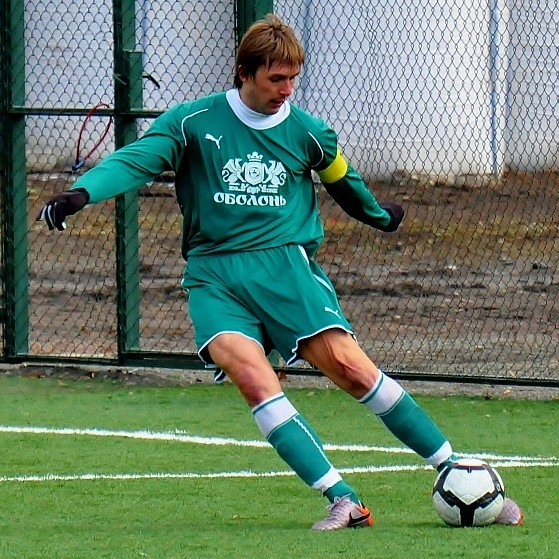

Personal information
- Date of birth: 30 April 1984 (age 42)
- Place of birth: Kaniv, Soviet Union (now Ukraine)
- Height: 1.87 m (6 ft 2 in)
- Position: Defender

Youth career
- 1998–2000: RVUFK Kyiv

Senior career*
| Years | Team | Apps | (Gls) |
| 2001–2003 | Dnipro Dnipropetrovsk | 0 | (0) |
| 2001–2002 | → Dnipro-3 Dnipropetrovsk | 26 | (0) |
| 2001–2003 | → Dnipro-2 Dnipropetrovsk | 25 | (2) |
| 2003–2005 | Borysfen Boryspil | 40 | (3) |
| 2003 | → Desna Chernihiv (loan) | 4 | (0) |
| 2003 | → Borysfen-2 Boryspil | 8 | (0) |
| 2005–2008 | Shakhtar Donetsk | 1 | (0) |
| 2005 | → Shakhtar-2 Donetsk | 6 | (0) |
| 2006–2007 | → Metalurh Zaporizhzhia (loan) | 22 | (0) |
| 2007–2008 | → Kharkiv (loan) | 5 | (0) |
| 2008–2009 | Tavriya Simferopol | 12 | (0) |
| 2010–2011 | Obolon Kyiv | 7 | (0) |
| 2011 | Dnepr Mogilev | 7 | (0) |
| 2012 | Minsk | 6 | (0) |
| 2012 | Krymteplytsia Molodizhne | 13 | (1) |
| 2013–2014 | Dnepr Mogilev | 55 | (4) |
| 2015–2016 | Belshina Bobruisk | 36 | (2) |
| 2016–2020 | Vitebsk | 81 | (2) |
| 2021 | Livyi Bereh Kyiv | 5 | (1) |

International career
| 2004–2005 | Ukraine U21 | 5 | (1) |
- * Club domestic league appearances and goals as of 31 December 2021

Oleh Oleksandrovych Karamushka (Ukrainian: Олег Карамушка; born 30 April 1984) is a Ukrainian former football defender.

== Club career ==
=== Early years ===
Karamushka is a product of Dnipro Cherkasy youth school system.

=== Tavriya Simferopol ===
On 19 August 2008, Karamushka signed a two-year contract with Tavriya Simferopol as a free agent.

== International career ==
Karamushka was a member of the Ukrainian national youth teams.
