= Oleksandr Kosyrin =

Ukrainian footballer (born 1977)

Oleksandr Kosyrin Олександр Косирін
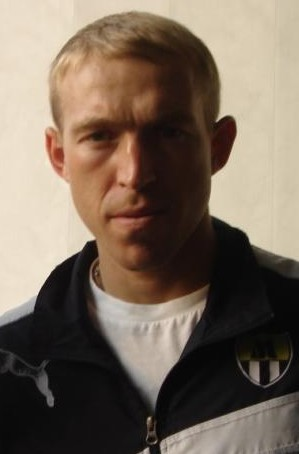

Personal information
- Full name: Oleksandr Mykhaylovych Kosyrin
- Date of birth: 18 June 1977 (age 49)
- Place of birth: Zaporizhzhia, Ukraine
- Height: 1.84 m (6 ft 0 in)
- Position: Forward

Youth career
- Torpedo Zaporizhzhia

Senior career*
Years	Team	Apps	(Gls)
1994–1995	Viktor Zaporizhzhia	35	(5)
1996	Torpedo Zaporizhzhia	21	(0)
1997–1999	Dynamo Kyiv	5	(1)
1997–1999	→ Dynamo-2 Kyiv	80	(28)
1997–1999	→ Dynamo-3 Kyiv	15	(8)
1999	→ Cherkasy (loan)	18	(11)
2000	Maccabi Tel Aviv	17	(4)
2000–2002	CSKA / Arsenal Kyiv	32	(4)
2000–2002	→ CSKA-2 Kyiv	14	(8)
2002–2005	Chornomorets Odesa	86	(44)
2005–2008	Metalurh Donetsk	61	(26)
2008–2010	Chornomorets Odesa	19	(8)
2010–2011	Odesa	41	(15)
2012–2013	Hoverla Uzhhorod	22	(10)

International career
1996–1998	Ukraine U21	6	(4)
2003–2005	Ukraine	7	(0)
- * Club domestic league appearances and goals

Oleksandr Mykhaylovych Kosyrin (Ukrainian: Олександр Михайлович Косирін; born 18 June 1977) is a Ukrainian former professional footballer who played as a forward. He made seven appearances for the Ukraine national team.

== Club career ==
Kosyrin started playing in his home town of Zaporizhzhia, at the football academy of Torpedo Zaporizhzhia. He spent two seasons playing in the Ukrainian Second League with Viktor Zaporizhia. In 1995, he was brought back to Torpedo Zaporizhzhia, and after two seasons was sold to the Ukrainian giants Dynamo Kyiv. He only managed a handful of appearances for the senior team, spending most of his time playing for Dynamo-3 Kyiv and Dynamo-2 Kyiv, the club's reserve teams which compete in the Ukrainian Second League and Ukrainian First League respectively. In 1998, he was loaned out to FC Cherkasy, and had a good season there, scoring 11 goals in 18 league games. Kosyrin also spent a year playing in Israel with Maccabi Tel Aviv. He also spent two years with Arsenal Kyiv. In 2002, he was sold to the newly promoted Chornomorets Odesa, where he finally established himself as a formidable player. Kosyrin had a good three-year spell with the team, becoming the league leading scorer in the 2004–05 season. He formed a strong partnership with Kostantyn Balabanov. In 2005, he was sold to Metalurh Donetsk where he continued his good scoring form. On 19 June 2008, he made his return to Odesa by signing a two-year contract with Chornomorets. In the summer of 2010, when his contract expired, he joined Dniester Ovidiopol in the Ukrainian First League.

== International career ==
Kosyrin played for the Ukraine U21 national team on six occasions and for the Ukraine senior national team seven times. His senior debut came on 15 August 2005 in a game against Macedonia.
