= Andriy Tovt =

Ukrainian footballer

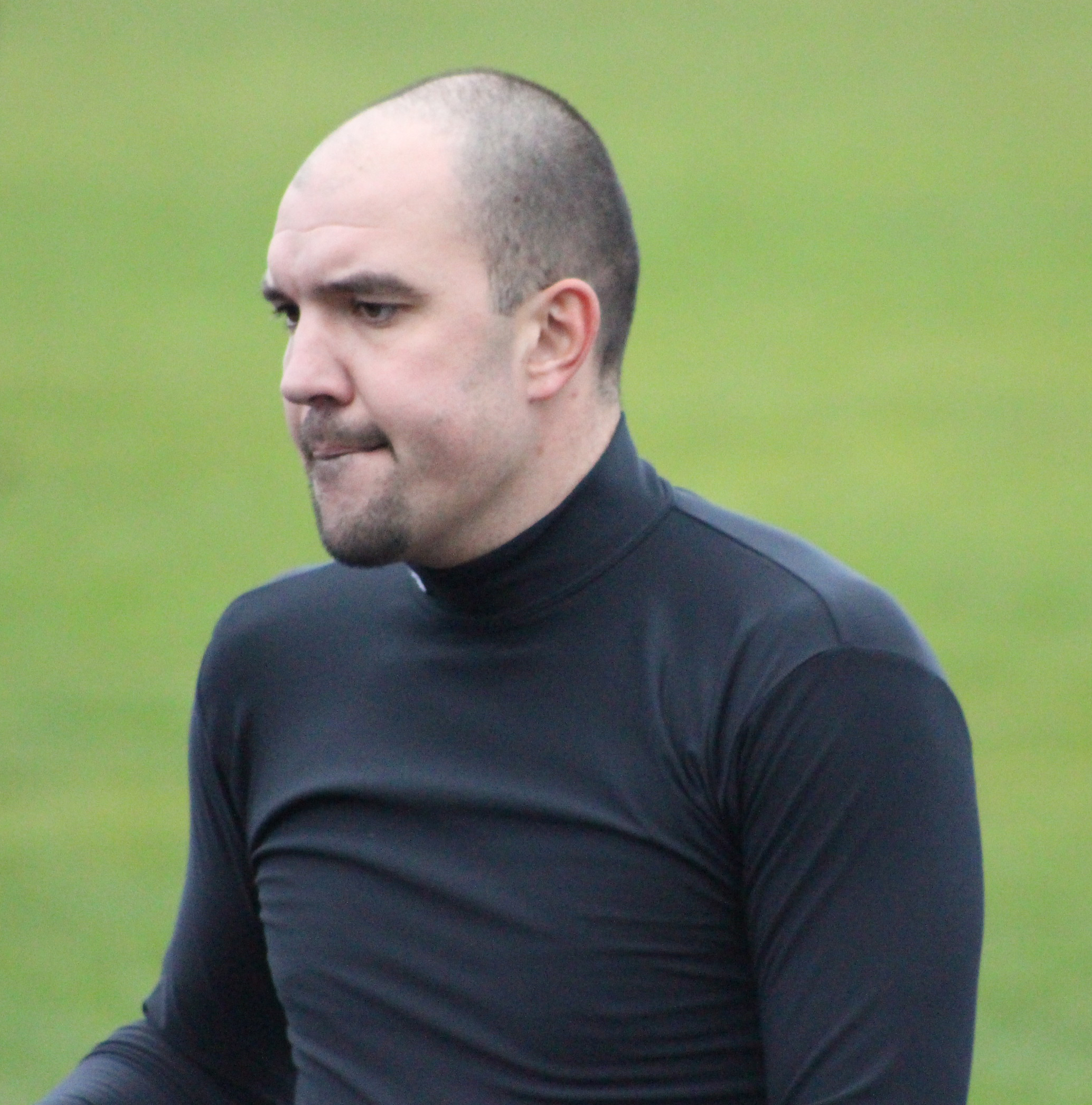

Personal information
- Full name: Andriy Volodymyrovych Tovt
- Date of birth: 12 March 1985 (age 41)
- Place of birth: Kyiv, Soviet Union (now Ukraine)
- Height: 1.88 m (6 ft 2 in)
- Position: Goalkeeper

Team information
- Current team: Lyubomyr Stavyshche (goalkeeping coach)

Senior career*
Years	Team	Apps	(Gls)
2001–2008	Obolon Kyiv	68	(2)
2002–2005	→ Obolon-2 Kyiv	30	(0)
2003–2004	→ Krasyliv-Obolon	5	(0)
2008–2009	Illichivets Mariupol	0	(0)
2009–2010	Obolon Kyiv	9	(0)
2010–2012	Zirka Kirovohrad	38	(0)
2012	Obolon Kyiv	8	(0)
2013	Mykolaiv	24	(0)
2017–2019	Avanhard Bziv		

Managerial career
- 2021–: Lyubomyr Stavyshche (goalkeeping coach)
- * Club domestic league appearances and goals as of 5 May 2015

Andriy Volodymyrovych Tovt (born 12 March 1985) is a Ukrainian former professional football goalkeeper and current goalkeeping coach at Lyubomyr Stavyshche.
