= Valeriy Boychenko =

Ukrainian footballer

Personal information
- Full name: Valeriy Boychenko
- Date of birth: 26 February 1989 (age 37)
- Place of birth: Mykolaiv, Ukraine, Soviet Union
- Height: 1.78 m (5 ft 10 in)
- Position: Midfielder

Youth career
- 2002–2006: MFC Mykolaiv

Senior career*
Years	Team	Apps	(Gls)
2007–2008	MFC Mykolaiv	29	(0)
2008–2010	Kharkiv	4	(0)
2010	MFC Mykolaiv	0	(0)
- * Club domestic league appearances and goals

Valeriy Boychenko (born 26 February 1989) is a Ukrainian former professional football midfielder who played for Kharkiv in the Ukrainian Premier League. He was promoted from the reserve squad in July 2008.
