= Anatoliy Kitsuta =

Ukrainian footballer (born 1985)

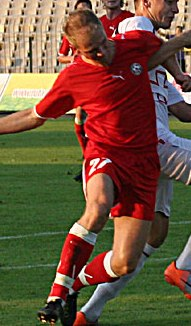

Personal information
- Full name: Anatoliy Viktorovych Kitsuta
- Date of birth: 22 December 1985 (age 40)
- Place of birth: Kyiv, Ukrainian SSR, Soviet Union
- Height: 1.83 m (6 ft 0 in)
- Position: Defender

Senior career*
Years	Team	Apps	(Gls)
2001	Borysfen-2 Boryspil	10	(0)
2002–2004	Dynamo-3 Kyiv	44	(1)
2003–2005	Dynamo-2 Kyiv	30	(0)
2005–2009	Dynamo Kyiv	0	(0)
2006	→ Zakarpattia Uzhhorod (loan)	11	(0)
2006	→ Kharkiv (loan)	6	(0)
2007	→ Arsenal Kyiv (loan)	4	(0)
2007–2008	→ Dnipro Cherkasy (loan)	32	(2)
2008–2009	→ Lviv (loan)	18	(0)
2009	Obolon Kyiv	14	(0)
2010–2011	Kryvbas Kryvyi Rih	13	(1)
2011–2013	Sevastopol	5	(0)
2012–2013	→ Poltava (loan)	9	(0)
2013–2016	Obolon-Brovar Kyiv	61	(1)

International career
2005–2006	Ukraine U21	2	(0)
Medal record
Men's football
Representing Ukraine
UEFA European Under-19 Championship
Bronze medal – third place	2004 Switzerland
- * Club domestic league appearances and goals

Anatoliy Viktorovych Kitsuta (Ukrainian: Анатолій Вікторович Кіцута; born 22 December 1985) is a Ukrainian retired professional footballer who played as a defender.

== See also ==
- 2005 FIFA World Youth Championship squads#Ukraine
