= Artem Kusliy =

Ukrainian footballer

Personal information
- Full name: Artem Volodymyrovych Kusliy
- Date of birth: 7 July 1981 (age 45)
- Place of birth: Dnipropetrovsk, Soviet Union
- Height: 1.84 m (6 ft 1/2 in)
- Position: Goalkeeper

Senior career*
Years	Team	Apps	(Gls)
1998–2007	Dnipro Dnipropetrovsk	42	(0)
1998–2003	→ Dnipro-2 Dnipropetrovsk	72	(0)
2000–2002	→ Dnipro-3 Dnipropetrovsk	21	(0)
2007–2008	Naftovyk-Ukrnafta Okhtyrka	13	(0)
2008	Kryvbas Kryvyi Rih	4	(0)
Total		152	(0)

International career
2003	Ukraine U-21	1	(0)

Managerial career
- 2010–2016: Dnipro Dnipropetrovsk (youth team assistant)
- 2016–2017: Dnipro Dnipropetrovsk (assistant)
- 2017–2020: Dnipro-1 (assistant)
Medal record
Men's football
Representing Ukraine
UEFA European Under-18 Championship
Runner-up	2000 Germany
- * Club domestic league appearances and goals

Artem Volodymyrovych Kusliy (Ukrainian: Артем Володимирович Куслій; born 7 July 1981) is a Ukrainianformer professional footballer who played as a goalkeeper.

Kusliy played for Dnipro, Naftovyk and Kryvbas in the Ukrainian Premier League.

== See also ==
- 2001 FIFA World Youth Championship squads#Ukraine
