= Viktor Melnyk =

Ukrainian footballer (born 1980)

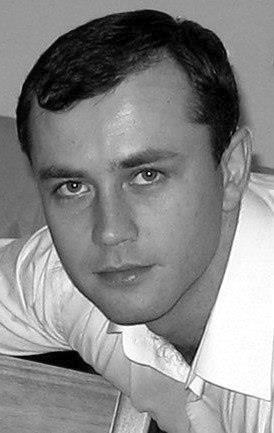

Personal information
- Full name: Viktor Volodymyrovych Melnyk
- Date of birth: 11 August 1980 (age 46)
- Place of birth: Kyiv, Soviet Union
- Height: 1.82 m (6 ft 0 in)
- Position: Defender

Youth career
- Lokomotyv Kyiv

Senior career*
Years	Team	Apps	(Gls)
1998–2003	Metalurh Zaporizhzhia	43	(1)
1998–2003	→ Metalurh-2 Zaporizhzhia	62	(4)
2004	Spartak Ivano-Frankivsk	4	(0)
2004–2006	Obolon Kyiv	20	(0)
2005	→ Metalist Kharkiv (loan)	7	(0)
2006	Volyn Lutsk	17	(1)
2007–2008	Kryvbas Kryvyi Rih	31	(1)
2008–2010	Chornomorets Odesa	38	(2)
2010	Volyn Lutsk	1	(0)
2011–2012	Belshina Bobruisk	34	(1)
2013–2014	Helios Kharkiv	9	(0)
2015	Lokomotyv Kyiv (amateurs)	11	(2)
2016	Polissya Horodnytsia (amateurs)	13	(2)
- * Club domestic league appearances and goals

Viktor Volodymyrovych Melnyk (Ukrainian: Віктор Володимирович Мельник; born 11 August 1980) is a Ukrainian former professional footballer who played as a defender for Kryvbas, Volyn Lutsk, Metalist, Obolon Kyiv, Metalurh Zaporizhzhia, Chornomorets Odesa, and Helios Kharkiv.
