= Ivan Kotenko =

Ukrainian footballer

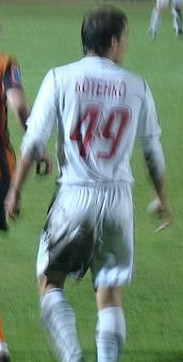

Personal information
- Full name: Ivan Petrovych Kotenko
- Date of birth: 28 April 1985 (age 41)
- Place of birth: Borodianka, Ukrainian SSR, Soviet Union
- Height: 1.79 m (5 ft 10 1/2 in)
- Position: Midfielder

Senior career*
Years	Team	Apps	(Gls)
2001–2002	Borysfen-2 Boryspil	16	(1)
2002–2008	Dnipro Dnipropetrovsk	15	(1)
2002–2004	→ Dnipro-2 Dnipropetrovsk	46	(14)
2007	→ Kryvbas Kryvyi Rih (loan)	9	(0)
2007–2008	→ Naftovyk-Ukrnafta Okhtyrka (loan)	22	(1)
2008	→ Lviv (loan)	8	(0)
2009	Oleksandriya	7	(1)
2010–2013	Obolon Kyiv	36	(3)
2012	→ Obolon-2 Kyiv	9	(1)
2013	Krymteplytsia Molodizhne	7	(0)
2014–2015	Kolos Zachepylivka	38	(13)
2015–2016	VPK-Ahro Shevchenkivka	11	(2)
Medal record
Men's football
Representing Ukraine
UEFA European Under-19 Championship
Bronze medal – third place	2004 Switzerland
- * Club domestic league appearances and goals

Ivan Petrovych Kotenko (born 28 April 1985) is a Ukrainian former football midfielder.

== Career ==
During the 2007–08 season, Kotenko was on loan at Naftovyk and in the 2008–09 season is on loan at FC Lviv from Dnipro Dnipropetrovsk.
