= Kostyantyn Balabanov =

Ukrainian footballer and manager

Personal information
- Full name: Kostyantyn Oleksiyovych Balabanov
- Date of birth: 13 August 1982 (age 44)
- Place of birth: Kiliia, Soviet Union (now Ukraine)
- Height: 1.78 m (5 ft 10 in)
- Position: Forward

Team information
- Current team: Chornomorets Odesa (assistant)

Youth career
- Chornomorets Odesa

Senior career*
Years	Team	Apps	(Gls)
2000–2005	Chornomorets Odesa	104	(35)
2000	→ Chornomorets-2 Odesa	4	(1)
2005–2007	Dnipro Dnipropetrovsk	29	(4)
2008	→ Naftovyk-Ukrnafta Okhtyrka (loan)	10	(0)
2008–2009	→ Kryvbas Kryvyi Rih (loan)	10	(0)
2010–2011	Chornomorets Odesa	10	(1)
2011	→ Chornomorets-2 Odesa	6	(2)
2011–2012	Odesa	14	(2)
2012	Oleksandriya	0	(0)
2012–2013	Odesa	26	(3)
Total		213	(48)

International career
2004	Ukraine	1	(0)

Managerial career
- 2017–: Chornomorets Odesa (assistant)
- * Club domestic league appearances and goals

Kostyantyn Oleksiyovych Balabanov (Ukrainian: Костянтин Олексійович Балабанов; born 13 August 1982) is a Ukrainian former football player and manager.

== Career ==
Balabanov was born in Kiliya, at the time in the Ukrainian SSR of the Soviet Union (today in the Odesa Oblast of southern Ukraine). He is a graduate of Chornomorets academy. In 2005, he was transferred to FC Dnipro Dnipropetrovsk. Having been featured in a few matches over the next 2 seasons, he was loaned out to FC Naftovyk-Ukrnafta Okhtyrka in 2008, and then to FC Kryvbas Kryvyi Rih. After his contract with Dnipro expired in 2009, he spent the next season without any professional football. In July 2010, he signed a new contract with Chornomorets.
