= Yevhen Bredun =

Ukrainian footballer (born 1982)

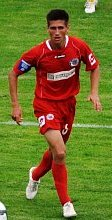

Personal information
- Full name: Yevhen Bredun
- Date of birth: 10 September 1982 (age 44)
- Place of birth: Kramatorsk, Soviet Union
- Height: 1.81 m (5 ft 11 in)
- Position: Midfielder

Senior career*
Years	Team	Apps	(Gls)
2000–2009	Shakhtar Donetsk	10	(0)
2000–2003	→ Shakhtar-2 Donetsk	73	(6)
2000–2003	→ Shakhtar-3 Donetsk	7	(0)
2004	→ Illychivets Mariupol (loan)	2	(0)
2004	→ Illychivets-2 Mariupol (loan)	2	(0)
2004	→ Shakhtar-2 Donetsk	2	(0)
2004	→ Borysfen Boryspil (loan)	8	(0)
2005–2006	→ Metalurh Zaporizhya (loan)	27	(2)
2006–2007	→ Arsenal Kyiv (loan)	27	(0)
2009	Tytan Donetsk	11	(4)
2009	Gomel	6	(1)
2010–2013	Sevastopol	51	(4)
2013	Belshina Bobruisk	12	(1)
2014–2015	Helios Kharkiv	10	(0)
2015–2016	SKChF Sevastopol	15	(2)
2016–2017	Gvardeyets Gvardeyskoye		
2017	Artek Yalta		
2018	Gvardeyets Gvardeyskoye		

International career
	Ukraine U21	8	(0)
- * Club domestic league appearances and goals

Yevhen Bredun (Ukrainian: Євген Бредун); Yevgeniy Bredun (Russian: Евге́ний Дми́триевич Бреду́н; born 10 September 1982) is a Ukrainian (until 2015), Russian former footballer.

== Career ==
Bredun began his professional career with Ukrainian Premier League club Shakhtar Donetsk, spending most of his time on loan to other Ukrainian clubs. He joined PFC Sevastopol in 2010.

In 2015 Bredun return to Sevastopol and participates in the Crimean championship.

He made 8 appearances for the U-21 national team.
