= Taras Karabin =

Ukrainian footballer

Personal information
- Full name: Taras Karabin
- Date of birth: 29 March 1989 (age 37)
- Place of birth: Lviv, Ukrainian SSR, Soviet Union
- Height: 1.79 m (5 ft 10 1/2 in)
- Position: Defender

Senior career*
Years	Team	Apps	(Gls)
2006	FC Karpaty-2 Lviv	3	(0)
2006–2007	FC Nyva Ternopil	11	(0)
2007–2008	FC Dniester Ovidiopol	18	(0)
2008–2010	FC Karpaty Lviv	0	(0)
2011–2014	FC Pogon Lviv (amateur)		
- * Club domestic league appearances and goals

Taras Karabin (Ukrainian: Тарас Іванович Карабин; born 29 March 1989, Lviv, Ukrainian SSR, Soviet Union) is a former professional Ukrainian football defender.

== Career ==
Taras Karabin began his football career in the Ukrainian Second League side Karpaty 2, where his first coach was T. Tkatchuk. In the club, he managed to play only 3 matches before moving to Nyva Ternopil during the 2006/2007 season during which he played 11. In the summer of 2007, Taras Karabin moved to Dniester Ovidiopol, where he debuted in the Ukrainian First League and played 18 matches for the club. In the 2008 summer transfer season, Karabin moved to back to his home town to play for Karpaty Lviv.
