= Karambaini =

Karambaini is a sub-location in Limuru East Ward, Kiambu County, Kenya.

As of 1991, there were five villages in the sublocation: Gikabu, Itungi, Muna, and "Kwa Muhuri." At that time, estimates of the sizes of the villages were 80 homes in Muna, 40 homes in Itungi, 70 homes in Gikuba, 26 homes in Kwa Muhuri, and 170 homes in Mabroukie. Itungi and Kwa Muhuri consisted of homes "built on rows ... and quite near to each other," while "in Muna and Gikuba villages houses were built along the ridges while cultivation was done on the sloping grounds," by residents who mostly "own two acre plots" with houses built at "quite a distance."

In 2026, Kenya News Agency reported on a security lighting project in the area, which the news service reported "is largely composed of farming households" particularly dairy farming, as well as "coffee and horticultural farming, small-scale poultry keeping, boda boda transport services, and retail trade."

== Schools ==
- Limuru girls higher secondary school
