= Serhiy Pivnenko =

Ukrainian footballer

Personal information
- Full name: Serhiy Pivnenko
- Date of birth: 19 October 1984 (age 42)
- Place of birth: Voroshylovhrad, Ukraine
- Height: 1.85 m (6 ft 1 in)
- Position: Forward

Youth career
- 1998–99: SSSOR Ukrayina Luhansk
- 1998: → Shakhtar Makiivka
- 1999–01: Shakhtar Donetsk

Senior career*
Years	Team	Apps	(Gls)
2001–09	Shakhtar Donetsk		
2001–04	→ Shakhtar-2 Donetsk (loan)	84	(33)
2002–03	→ Shakhtar-3 Donetsk (loan)	3	(1)
2005	→ Illychivets Mariupol (loan)	8	(0)
2008	→ Shakhtar-3 Donetsk (loan)	1	(1)
2008–09	→ Arsenal Kyiv (loan)	13	(0)
2010	Shakhtar Sverdlovsk	1	(0)
2011	FC Popasna	8	(1)
2012	Tytan Armyansk	11	(3)

International career
2004–2005	Ukraine U-21	15	(2)
- * Club domestic league appearances and goals

Serhiy Pivnenko (born 19 October 1984) is a professional Ukrainian football midfielder.
