= Oleksiy Ivanov =

Ukrainian footballer

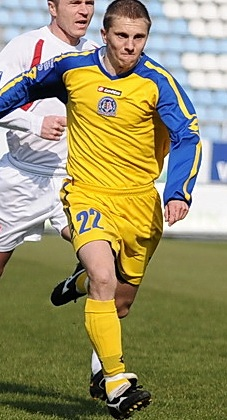

Personal information
- Date of birth: 9 January 1978 (age 48)
- Place of birth: Artemivsk, Ukrainian SSR, Soviet Union
- Height: 1.70 m (5 ft 7 in)
- Position: Midfielder

Senior career*
| Years | Team | Apps | (Gls) |
| 1997–1999 | FC Shakhtar-2 Donetsk | 67 | (6) |
| 2000–2001 | FC Polihraftekhnika Oleksandria | 60 | (15) |
| 2001–2002 | FC Karpaty Lviv | 12 | (0) |
| 2002 | → FC Karpaty-2 Lviv | 3 | (1) |
| 2002–2006 | FC Arsenal Kyiv | 104 | (3) |
| 2006–2007 | SC Tavriya Simferopol | 22 | (0) |
| 2007–2008 | FC Naftovyk-Ukrnafta Okhtyrka | 22 | (1) |
| 2008–2009 | FC Kharkiv | 19 | (0) |
| 2009–2010 | FC Zakarpattia Uzhhorod | 13 | (0) |

International career
| 2002 | Ukraine | 1 | (0) |
- * Club domestic league appearances and goals

Oleksiy Ivanov (born 9 January 1978, Ukrainian SSR, Soviet Union) is a Ukrainian former football midfielder. He moved from Naftovyk during the summer transfer season.
