= Maciej Nalepa =

Polish footballer

Personal information
- Date of birth: 31 March 1978 (age 48)
- Place of birth: Tarnów, Poland
- Height: 1.90 m (6 ft 3 in)
- Position: Goalkeeper

Team information
- Current team: Sokół Kamień (assistant & goalkeeping coach)

Youth career
- Stal Rzeszów

Senior career*
Years	Team	Apps	(Gls)
1996–1998	Resovia Rzeszów		
1998	Hetman Zamość		
1998–1999	Stal Sanok		
1999–2001	Stal Stalowa Wola		
2001–2008	Karpaty Lviv	79	(0)
2001–2004	→ Karpaty-2 Lviv	13	(0)
2001–2002	→ Halychyna-Karpaty Lviv	3	(0)
2005	→ Venta (loan)	9	(0)
2008–2009	Kharkiv	8	(0)
2009–2010	Piast Gliwice	9	(0)
2011	Odra Wodzisław	7	(0)
2011	KS Zaczernie	7	(0)
2012–2015	Piast Tuczempy		
2015	Stal Rzeszów		
2015	MKS Kańczuga		
2016	Wisłok Wiśniowa		
2016–2017	Piast Tuczempy		
2016–2017	Błękitni Pełkinie		
2019	Cosmos Nowotaniec	6	(0)
2021–2022	LKS Jasionka	5	(0)

International career
2003–2004	Poland	2	(0)
- * Club domestic league appearances and goals

Maciej Nalepa (born 31 March 1978) is a Polish former professional footballer who played as a goalkeeper. He is currently the assistant and goalkeeping coach of Sokół Kamień.

== Career ==
Nalepa previously played for Ukrainian sides Karpaty Lviv and Kharkiv. In February 2011, he joined Odra Wodzisław.

He was a part of Poland national team, earning two caps in 2003 and 2004.

== Honours ==
Cosmos Nowotaniec

- Klasa A Krosno I: 2018–19
