= Ihor Buryak =

Ukrainian footballer (born 1983)

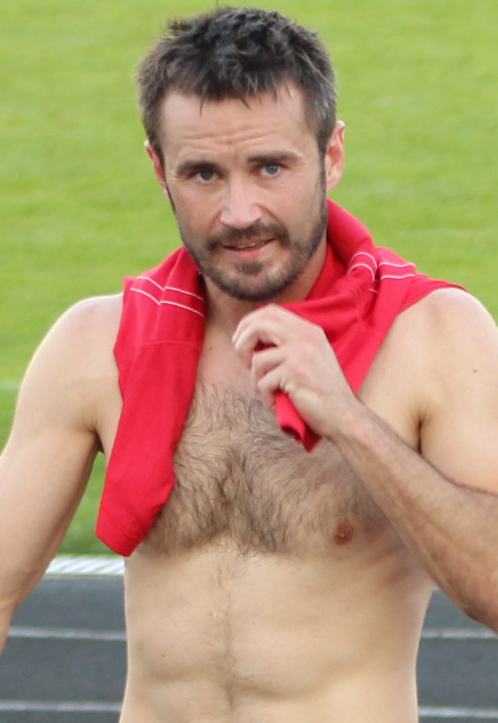

Personal information
- Full name: Ihor Vasylevych Buryak
- Date of birth: 12 January 1983 (age 43)
- Place of birth: Kyiv, Ukrainian SSR
- Height: 1.83 m (6 ft 0 in)
- Position: Defender

Youth career
- 2000–2001: Sachsen Leipzig

Senior career*
Years	Team	Apps	(Gls)
2001–2002	Sachsen Leipzig	1	(0)
2002–2004	Metalurh Donetsk	1	(0)
2002–2004	→ Metalurh-2 Donetsk	41	(0)
2005	Arsenal Kharkiv	4	(0)
2005–2007	Kharkiv	10	(0)
2007–2008	Illichivets Mariupol	23	(2)
2008	→ Illichivets-2 Mariupol	1	(0)
2008–2009	Dniester Ovidiopol	21	(4)
2009	Tavriya Simferopol	1	(0)
2010	Dniester Ovidiopol	18	(0)
2010	Chornomorets Odesa	8	(0)
2011	Odesa	13	(0)
2011–2012	Vostok	41	(2)
2013	Naftan Novopolotsk	29	(0)
2014–2015	Hirnyk Kryvyi Rih	20	(1)
2015–2017	TSK Simferopol	46	(0)
2017–2022	Kyzyltash Bakhchisaray	84	(2)
2022	Rubin Yalta	0	(0)
- * Club domestic league appearances and goals as of 31 December 2022

Ihor Buryak (born 12 January 1983) is a Ukrainian former professional football defender.

== Career ==
He played for Hirnyk Kryvyi Rih. His previous club was FC Chornomorets Odesa where he moved in June 2010 from FC Tavriya Simferopol. Buryak also played for such clubs as Metalurh Donetsk, Arsenal Kharkiv (later renamed FC Kharkiv), lllychivets Mariupol, and FC Dniester Ovidiopol.
