= Paulo Vogt =

Brazilian footballer and manager

Personal information
- Full name: Paulo César Ramos Vogt
- Date of birth: February 7, 1977 (age 49)
- Place of birth: Guarapuava, Brazil
- Height: 1.91 m (6 ft 3 in)
- Position: Striker

Youth career
- –1996: Batel

Senior career*
Years	Team	Apps	(Gls)
1997	Mogi Mirim		
1997–1998	Iraty		
1998–1999	Batel		
2000	Kreuzlingen		
2001	Schaffhausen		
2001–2002	Baden	26	(12)
2002–2003	Winterthur	21	(14)
2003–2004	Vaduz	33	(12)
2004–2005	Lucerne	7	(3)
2005–2006	Sion	29	(27)
2006–2009	Metalurh Donetsk	13	(1)
2007	→ Stal Alchevsk (loan)	3	(0)
2008–2009	→ APEP (loan)	20	(4)
2009–2010	Chiasso	16	(9)
2010–2012	Solothurn	46	(32)
2012–2013	Wangen b.O.	10	(4)
2013–2014	Breitenrain	12	(2)

Managerial career
- 2014–: Breitenrain (assistant manager)
- * Club domestic league appearances and goals

Paulo César Ramos Vogt (born February 7, 1977) is a Brazilian football (soccer) striker who works for Swiss Breitenrain as an assistant manager. He previously spent his career in Liechtenstein, Ukraine and Cyprus before signing for the Swiss club in 2009.

Paulo Vogt made six Ukrainian Premier League appearances, scoring once, for FC Metalurh Donetsk during 2006.

== Honours ==
Sion

- Swiss Cup: 2005–06
