= FC Odesa =

Association football club based in Odesa, Ukraine

- Full name: FC Odesa
- Founded: 2011
- Dissolved: 2013
- Ground: Spartak Stadium, Odesa
- Chairman: Andriy Prodayevych
- Head Coach: Andriy Parkhomenko
- League: Ukrainian First League
- 2011–12: 15th
Home colours	Away colours

FC Odesa was a professional Ukrainian football club based in Odesa. The club plays in blue-white colors. The club originally was called Dnister and played in Ovidiopol but after the 2010–11 season the club moved to Odesa.

== History ==
The first football team in Ovidiopol was established in 1947. There was an amateur team, called "Dzerzhinets", which played in the local competitions of the Odesa Oblast and Ukraine. Amateur Ovidiopol team became Odesa Oblast champions in 1980. Professional football club was created in 1992 based on the amateur team – shortly after Soviet Union breakup in 1991. In 1998, the team played in the amateur Ukrainian championship and won it in 1999. Since 2001 Dnister has played in the professional leagues of Ukrainian football. In 2008 the new ownership of the club was announcing about its plans to build a new stadium for Dnister.

During the 2010–11 season Dniester started playing their home games in Odesa due to the unsafe state of their stadium (Viktor Dukov) in Ovidiopol. With the inability to secure finances to repair the stadium the club opted to move their head office to Odesa after the season.

Previous emblem before 2008

The club was relegated from Ukrainian First League after the 2012–13 season after losing a promotion/relegation playoff to Nyva Ternopil. The club withdrew from the PFL prior to the 2013–14 season.

== Honors ==
- Ukrainian Druha Liha: 1

2005/06 Champions Group A

== League and cup history ==
=== Dnister Ovidiopol ===
Season	Div.	Pos.	Pl.	W	D	L	GS	GA	P	Domestic Cup	Europe	Notes
2001–02	3rd "B"	5	34	16	9	9	44	27	57	Did not enter		
2002–03	3rd "B"	5	30	14	5	11	27	23	47	1/16 finals		
2003–04	3rd "B"	4	30	16	7	7	38	23	55	1/32 finals		
2004–05	3rd "B"	10	26	9	4	13	33	37	33	1/32 finals		
2005–06	3rd "B"	8	28	10	8	10	28	27	38	1/32 finals		
2006–07	3rd "A"	1	28	18	8	2	44	12	62	1/32 finals		Promoted
2007–08	2nd	12	38	12	13	13	33	39	49	1/8 finals		
2008–09	2nd	9	32	11	10	11	39	40	43	1/16 finals		
2009–10	2nd	11	34	12	8	14	44	47	44	1/16 finals		
2010–11	2nd	13	34	10	12	12	39	42	42	1/32 finals		

=== FC Odesa ===
Season	Div.	Pos.	Pl.	W	D	L	GS	GA	P	Domestic Cup	Europe	Notes
2011–12	2nd	15	34	7	10	17	37	51	31	1/32 finals		
2012–13	2nd	16	34	7	3	24	21	63	24	1/16 finals		Relegated – Withdrew

== Head coaches (Managers) ==
- 1997–2007 Vasyl Ushchapovskyi (father of Andriy Ushchapovskyi)
  - 2001–2003 Viktor Hryshko
- 2007–2008 Ihor Nehara (former manager of Chornomorochka and Chornomorets-2)
- 2008 Vladyslav Zubkov (interim)
- 2008 Timerlan Huseinov (interim)
- 2008–2013 Andriy Parkhomenko

== Presidents ==
- ?–2000 unknown
- 2000–2007 Khasan Khasaiev
- 2007–2013 Andrei Prodaievich
