= 2012–13 FC Metalurh Donetsk season =

Metalurh Donetsk
2012–13 season
- Chairman: Serhiy Taruta
- Manager: Yuriy Maksymov
- Stadium: Metalurh Stadium
- Premier League: 6th
- Ukrainian Cup: Round of 32
- Europa League: Third qualifying round
- Top goalscorer: League: Dramane Traoré (6); All: Junior Moraes (7)
- Lowest home attendance: 2,200 vs Tavriya 18 August 2012

The Metalurh Donetsk 2012–13 season was Metalurh's 16th Ukrainian Premier League season, and their first season under manager Yuriy Maksymov. During the season Metalurh Donetsk competed in the Ukrainian Premier League, Europa League and Ukrainian Cup.

== Squad ==
Squad is given according to the club's official website, as of September 1, 2012, as reported to Ukrainian Premier League. Note: Flags indicate national team as defined under FIFA eligibility rules; some limited exceptions apply. Players may hold more than one non-FIFA nationality.

| No. | Pos. | Nation | Player |
|---|---|---|---|
| 1 | GK | UKR | Oleksandr Musiyenko |
| 2 | DF | UKR | Artem Baranovskyi |
| 4 | DF | UKR | Vyacheslav Checher (captain) |
| 6 | MF | ARM | Karlen Mkrtchyan |
| 7 | MF | UKR | Mykola Morozyuk |
| 8 | FW | NED | Gregory Nelson |
| 9 | MF | SRB | Đorđe Lazić |
| 10 | FW | ARM | Gevorg Ghazaryan |
| 11 | MF | BEL | Danilo |
| 12 | GK | UKR | Oleksandr Bandura |
| 13 | MF | CYP | Constantinos Makrides |
| 14 | DF | UKR | Oleksandr Volovyk |

| No. | Pos. | Nation | Player |
|---|---|---|---|
| 15 | FW | MLI | Dramane Traoré |
| 17 | FW | BRA | Zé Soares |
| 18 | MF | BUL | Velizar Dimitrov (vice-captain) |
| 19 | FW | UKR | Vitaliy Ivanko |
| 20 | DF | POR | China |
| 21 | DF | ARM | Artak Yedigaryan |
| 27 | FW | ITA | Gaetano Monachello |
| 31 | GK | UKR | Dmytro Vorobyov |
| 43 | MF | UKR | Pavlo Hryschenko |
| 44 | DF | UKR | Vasyl Pryima |
| 84 | MF | UKR | Denys Holaydo |
| 91 | FW | BRA | Junior Moraes |

For recent transfers, see List of Ukrainian football transfers summer 2010 and List of Ukrainian football transfers summer 2009.

=== Out on loan ===
Note: Flags indicate national team as defined under FIFA eligibility rules; some limited exceptions apply. Players may hold more than one non-FIFA nationality.

| No. / Pos. / Nation / Player; — / GK / UKR / Kostyantyn Odolskyi (to ?) | No. / Pos. / Nation / Player; — / MF / UKR / Anton Dolhyi (to Helios Kharkiv) |

== Competitions ==
=== 2012-13 Ukrainian Premier League ===
==== Results summary ====
| Overall | | | | | | | | Home | | | | | | Away | | | | | |
| Pld | W | D | L | GF | GA | GD | Pts | W | D | L | GF | GA | GD | W | D | L | GF | GA | GD |
|---|---|---|---|---|---|---|---|---|---|---|---|---|---|---|---|---|---|---|---|
| 11 | 5 | 2 | 4 | 20 | 13 | +7 | 17 | 2 | 2 | 1 | 15 | 7 | +8 | 3 | 0 | 3 | 5 | 6 | −1 |

Last updated: 25 August 2012.
Source: Soccerway

==== Results by round ====
| Round | 1 | 2 | 3 | 4 | 5 | 6 | 7 | 8 | 9 | 10 | 11 | 12 | 13 | 14 | 15 | 16 | 17 | 18 | 19 | 20 | 21 | 22 | 23 | 24 | 25 | 26 | 27 | 28 | 29 | 30 |
|---|---|---|---|---|---|---|---|---|---|---|---|---|---|---|---|---|---|---|---|---|---|---|---|---|---|---|---|---|---|---|
| Ground | A | H | A | H | A | H | A | A | H | A | H | A | | | | | | | | | | | | | | | | | | |
| Result | L | L | L | D | W | D | W | W | W | L | W | | | | | | | | | | | | | | | | | | | |
| Position | 11 | 11 | 15 | 14 | 13 | 14 | 9 | 8 | 5 | 6 | 6 | | | | | | | | | | | | | | | | | | | |

Source: Soccerway
A = Away; H = Home; W = Win; D = Draw; L = Loss

==== Results ====
| 14 July 2012 Match 1 | Dynamo | 1 – 0 | Metalurh | Kyiv |
| 19:30 | Ideye Brown 90+2' | Summary | | Stadium: NSC Olimpiyskiy; Attendance: 32,850; Referee: Vitaliy Hodulyan |

| 22 July 2012 Match 2 | Metalurh | 1 – 2 | Zorya | Donetsk |
| 20:00 | Soares 32' | Summary | Ljubenović 9'; Galyuza 81' | Stadium: Metalurh Stadium; Attendance: 2,500; Referee: Oleksandr Derdo |

| 29 July 2012 Match 3 | Dnipro | 2 – 0 | Metalurh | Dnipropetrovsk |
| 19:30 | Konoplyanka 4', 27' | Summary | | Stadium: Dnipro Arena; Attendance: 20,312; Referee: Kostiantyn Trukhanov |

| 5 August 2012 Match 4 | Metalurh | 2 – 2 | Metalist | Donetsk |
| 21:00 | Baranovskyi 71'; Traoré 90+1' | Summary | Xavier 7', 35' | Stadium: Metalurh Stadium; Attendance: 3,300; Referee: Anatoliy Zhabchenko |

| 12 August 2012 Match 5 | Illichivets | 0 – 1 | Metalurh | Mariupol |
| 21:00 | | Summary | Volovyk 54' | Stadium: Illichivets Stadium; Attendance: 7,000; Referee: Yuri Hrysio |

| 18 August 2012 Match 6 | Metalurh | 1 – 1 | Tavriya | Donetsk |
| 21:00 | Moraes 9' (pen.) | Summary | Pohorilyi (red card) 6'; Nazarenko 89' (pen.) | Stadium: Metalurh Stadium; Attendance: 2,200; Referee: Anatoliy Abdula |

| 26 August 2012 Match 7 | Metalurh Zaporizhya | 1 – 2 | Metalurh | Zaporizhya |
| 17:00 | Lazarovych 76' | Summary | Ghazaryan 7'; Moraes 60'; Makrides (yellow card) 30' (yellow-red card) 90+1' | Stadium: Slavutych-Arena; Attendance: 5,500; Referee: Dmytro Kutakov |

| 1 September 2012 Match 8 | Karpaty | 0 – 1 | Metalurh | Lviv |
| 17:30 | Kasyan (red card) 12' | Summary | Moraes 59' | Stadium: Ukraina Stadium; Attendance: 9,200; Referee: Serhiy Boiko |

| 16 September 2012 Match 9 | Metalurh | 5 – 0 | Arsenal | Donetsk |
| 16:30 | Moraes 25' (pen.), 88'; Ghazaryan 61'; Traoré 75', 90+2' | Summary | Shakhov (yellow card) 23' (yellow-red card) 34'; Florescu (red card) 38' | Stadium: Metalurh Stadium; Attendance: 3,300; Referee: Andriy Kuz'min |

| 30 September 2012 Match 10 | Hoverla | 2 – 1 | Metalurh | Uzhhorod |
| 16:00 | Odonkor 54' (pen.); Mališić 86' | Summary | Ghazaryan 69' | Stadium: Avanhard Stadium; Attendance: 5,250; Referee: Anatoliy Abdula |

| 5 October 2012 Match 11 | Metalurh | 6 – 2 | Kryvbas | Donetsk |
| 19:00 | Holaydo 37'; Volovyk 40' (pen.); Traoré 44', 62', 90+1'; Danilo 55' | Summary | Antonov 52' (pen.); Samodin 54' | Stadium: Metalurh Stadium; Attendance: 2,500; Referee: Kostiantyn Trukhanov |

| 20 October 2012 Match 12 | Volyn | v | Metalurh | Lutsk |
| 17:30 | | [ Summary] | | Stadium: Avanhard Stadium |

==== League table ====
| Pos | Team | Pld | W | D | L | GF | GA | GD | Pts | Qualification or relegation |
|---|---|---|---|---|---|---|---|---|---|---|
| 3 | Dynamo Kyiv | 30 | 20 | 2 | 8 | 55 | 23 | +32 | 62 | Qualification for the Europa League play-off round |
| 4 | Dnipro Dnipropetrovsk | 30 | 16 | 8 | 6 | 54 | 27 | +27 | 56 | Qualification for the Europa League play-off round |
| 5 | Metalurh Donetsk | 30 | 14 | 7 | 9 | 45 | 35 | +10 | 49 | Qualification for the Europa League third qualifying round |
| 6 | Chornomorets Odesa | 30 | 12 | 7 | 11 | 32 | 36 | −4 | 43 | Qualification for the Europa League second qualifying round |
| 7 | Kryvbas Kryvyi Rih (D) | 30 | 12 | 7 | 11 | 36 | 41 | −5 | 43 | Club expelled after season (Note: Kryvbas Kryvyi Rih were denied a license for the 2013–14 season due to financial problems and were expelled.) |

Source: uafootball.net.ua
Rules for classification: 1st points; 2nd goal difference; 3rd goals scored; 4th head-to-head points; 5th head-to-head goal difference; 6th head-to-head goals scored; 7th fair play; 8th draw (Regulation, p.52-53).
(D) Disqualified

=== 2012-13 Ukrainian Cup Results ===
| 22 September 2012 Round of 32 | Chornomorets | 2 – 0 | Metalurh | Odesa |
| 19:00 | Burdujan 51'; Leo Matos 52' | Summary | | Stadium: Chornomorets Stadium; Attendance: 16,058; Referee: Serhiy Lysenchuk |

=== UEFA Europa League ===
==== Second qualifying round ====
| 19 July 2012 2QR; 1st Leg | Metalurh Donetsk (Ukraine) | 7 – 0 | (Montenegro) Čelik Nikšić | Donetsk |
| 21:00 | Makrides 17', 49'; G. Ghazaryan 36', 61', 86'; Danilo 51'; Júnior Moraes 78' | Report | | Stadium: Metalurh Stadium; Attendance: 3,200; Referee: (Denmark) Jakob Kehlet |

| 26 July 2012 2QR; 2nd Leg | Čelik Nikšić (Montenegro) | 2 – 4 (2 – 11 agg.) | (Ukraine) Metalurh Donetsk | Nikšić |
| 19:30 | Jovović 23'; Zorić 50' (pen.) | Report | Danilo 15'; Junior Moraes 53'; Volovyk 72'; Zé Soares 84' | Stadium: Gradski stadion Attendance: 1,480; Referee: (Israel) Eli Hacmon |

==== Third qualifying round ====
| 2 August 2012 3QR; 1st Leg | Tromsø (Norway) | 1 – 1 | (Ukraine) Metalurh Donetsk | Tromsø |
| 21:00 | Ondrášek 43' | Report | Björck 88' (o.g.) | Stadium: Alfheim Stadion; Attendance: 2,276; Referee: (Scotland) Steven McLean |

| 9 August 2012 3QR; 2nd Leg | Metalurh Donetsk (Ukraine) | 0 – 1 (1 – 2 agg.) | (Norway) Tromsø | Donetsk |
| 21:00 | | Report | Prijović 9' | Stadium: Metalurh Stadium; Attendance: 2,800; Referee: (Belarus) Aleksei Kulbakov |

== Squad statistics ==
=== Goal scorers ===
As of 6 October 2012

| Place | Position | Nation | Number | Name | Premier League | Ukrainian Cup | Europa League | Total |
|---|---|---|---|---|---|---|---|---|
| 1 | FW | (Brazil) | 91 | Junior Moraes | 5 | 0 | 2 | 7 |
| 2 | FW | (Armenia) | 10 | Gevorg Ghazaryan | 3 | 0 | 3 | 6 |
| 2 | FW | (Mali) | 15 | Dramane Traoré | 6 | 0 | 0 | 6 |
| 4 | MF | (Belgium) | 11 | Danilo | 1 | 0 | 2 | 3 |
| 4 | DF | (Ukraine) | 14 | Oleksandr Volovyk | 2 | 0 | 1 | 3 |
| 6 | MF | (Cyprus) | 13 | Constantinos Makrides | 0 | 0 | 2 | 2 |
| 6 | FW | (Brazil) | 17 | Zé Soares | 1 | 0 | 1 | 2 |
| 8 | DF | (Ukraine) | 2 | Artem Baranovskyi | 1 | 0 | 0 | 1 |
| 8 | MF | (Ukraine) | 84 | Denys Holaydo | 1 | 0 | 0 | 1 |
| 8 | | | | Own goal | 0 | 0 | 1 | 1 |
| | | | | TOTALS | 20 | 0 | 12 | 32 |

=== Appearances and goals ===
As of 6 October 2012

| No. | Pos | Nat | Player | Total | | Premier League | | Ukrainian Cup | | Europe League | |
| No. | Pos | Nat | Player | Apps | Goals | Apps | Goals | Apps | Goals | Apps | Goals |
|---|---|---|---|---|---|---|---|---|---|---|---|
| 2 | DF | (Ukraine) UKR | Artem Baranovskyi | 9 | 1 | 7+1 | 1 | 1 | 0 | 0 | 0 |
| 4 | DF | (Ukraine) UKR | Vyacheslav Checher | 8 | 0 | 4 | 0 | 0 | 0 | 4 | 0 |
| 6 | MF | (Armenia) ARM | Karlen Mkrtchyan | 5 | 0 | 3+1 | 0 | 1 | 0 | 0 | 0 |
| 7 | MF | (Ukraine) UKR | Mykola Morozyuk | 16 | 0 | 11 | 0 | 1 | 0 | 3+1 | 0 |
| 8 | FW | (Netherlands) NED | Gregory Nelson | 13 | 0 | 3+6 | 0 | 0 | 0 | 1+3 | 0 |
| 9 | MF | (Serbia) SRB | Đorđe Lazić | 12 | 0 | 6+1 | 0 | 0+1 | 0 | 4 | 0 |
| 10 | FW | (Armenia) ARM | Gevorg Ghazaryan | 15 | 6 | 8+2 | 3 | 1 | 0 | 4 | 3 |
| 11 | MF | (Belgium) BEL | Danilo | 14 | 3 | 8+2 | 1 | 1 | 0 | 2+1 | 2 |
| 12 | GK | (Ukraine) UKR | Oleksandr Bandura | 16 | 0 | 11 | 0 | 1 | 0 | 4 | 0 |
| 13 | MF | (Cyprus) CYP | Constantinos Makrides | 14 | 2 | 7+2 | 0 | 1 | 0 | 3+1 | 2 |
| 14 | DF | (Ukraine) UKR | Oleksandr Volovyk | 15 | 3 | 10 | 2 | 1 | 0 | 4 | 1 |
| 15 | FW | (Mali) MLI | Dramane Traoré | 9 | 6 | 3+4 | 6 | 1 | 0 | 0+1 | 0 |
| 17 | FW | (Brazil) BRA | Zé Soares | 13 | 2 | 7+2 | 1 | 1 | 0 | 2+1 | 1 |
| 18 | MF | (Bulgaria) BUL | Velizar Dimitrov | 10 | 0 | 7 | 0 | 0 | 0 | 2+1 | 0 |
| 19 | FW | (Ukraine) UKR | Vitaliy Ivanko | 7 | 0 | 2+4 | 0 | 0+1 | 0 | 0 | 0 |
| 21 | DF | (Armenia) ARM | Artak Yedigaryan | 8 | 0 | 1+3 | 0 | 0+1 | 0 | 3 | 0 |
| 27 | FW | (Italy) ITA | Gaetano Monachello | 1 | 0 | 0+1 | 0 | 0 | 0 | 0 | 0 |
| 43 | MF | (Ukraine) UKR | Pavlo Hryschenko | 3 | 0 | 0+2 | 0 | 0 | 0 | 0+1 | 0 |
| 44 | DF | (Ukraine) UKR | Vasyl Pryima | 9 | 0 | 5+1 | 0 | 0 | 0 | 3 | 0 |
| 84 | MF | (Ukraine) UKR | Denys Holaydo | 13 | 1 | 10 | 1 | 1 | 0 | 2 | 0 |
| 91 | FW | (Brazil) BRA | Junior Moraes | 12 | 7 | 8 | 5 | 0 | 0 | 3+1 | 2 |
Players who appeared for Metalurh who left the club during the season:

=== Disciplinary record ===
| Number | Nation | Position | Name | Premier League | | Ukrainian Cup | | Europa League | | Total | |
| Number | Nation | Position | Name | Yellow card | Red card | Yellow card | Red card | Yellow card | Red card | Yellow card | Red card |
| 2 | (Ukraine) | DF | Artem Baranovskyi | 1 | 0 | 0 | 0 | 0 | 0 | 1 | 0 |
| 4 | (Ukraine) | DF | Vyacheslav Checher | 2 | 0 | 0 | 0 | 1 | 0 | 3 | 0 |
| 7 | (Ukraine) | MF | Mykola Morozyuk | 3 | 0 | 0 | 0 | 1 | 0 | 4 | 0 |
| 8 | (Netherlands) | FW | Gregory Nelson | 1 | 0 | 0 | 0 | 0 | 0 | 1 | 0 |
| 9 | (Serbia) | MF | Đorđe Lazić | 1 | 0 | 0 | 0 | 0 | 0 | 1 | 0 |
| 10 | (Armenia) | FW | Gevorg Ghazaryan | 0 | 0 | 0 | 0 | 2 | 0 | 2 | 0 |
| 11 | (Belgium) | MF | Danilo | 2 | 0 | 1 | 0 | 0 | 0 | 3 | 0 |
| 12 | (Ukraine) | GK | Oleksandr Bandura | 1 | 0 | 0 | 0 | 0 | 0 | 1 | 0 |
| 13 | (Cyprus) | MF | Constantinos Makrides | 1 | 1 | 0 | 0 | 1 | 0 | 2 | 1 |
| 14 | (Ukraine) | DF | Oleksandr Volovyk | 3 | 0 | 0 | 0 | 0 | 0 | 3 | 0 |
| 15 | (Mali) | FW | Dramane Traoré | 3 | 0 | 0 | 0 | 0 | 0 | 3 | 0 |
| 21 | (Armenia) | DF | Artak Yedigaryan | 1 | 0 | 0 | 0 | 0 | 0 | 1 | 0 |
| 44 | (Ukraine) | DF | Vasyl Pryima | 1 | 0 | 0 | 0 | 1 | 0 | 2 | 0 |
| 84 | (Ukraine) | MF | Denys Holaydo | 2 | 0 | 0 | 0 | 0 | 0 | 2 | 0 |
| | | | TOTALS | 22 | 1 | 1 | 0 | 6 | 0 | 29 | 1 |
