= 2012 Ukrainian Super Cup =

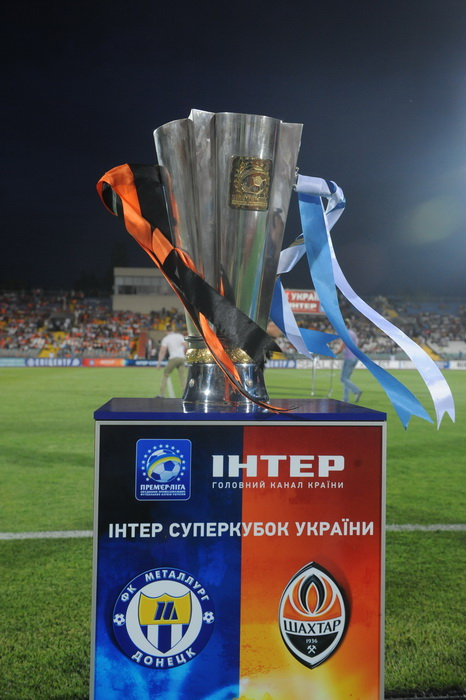
Metalurh Donetsk	Shakhtar Donetsk
0	2
- Date: 10 July 2012
- Venue: Avanhard Stadium, Luhansk
- Referee: Anatoliy Abdula
- Attendance: 21,050

The 2012 Ukrainian Super Cup became the ninth edition of Ukrainian Super Cup, an annual football match contested by the winners of the previous season's Ukrainian Top League and Ukrainian Cup competitions.

The match was played at the Avanhard Stadium, Luhansk, on 10 July 2012, and contested by league and cup winner Shakhtar Donetsk and cup runner-up Metalurh Donetsk. Shakhtar won it 2–0.

== Match ==
=== Details ===
10 July 2012

Metalurh Donetsk	0–2	Shakhtar Donetsk
	Report	Adriano 6'; Costa 35'

Avanhard Stadium, Luhansk
Attendance: 21,050
Referee: Anatoliy Abdula

Metalurh Donetsk
Shakhtar Donetsk

GK	12	(Ukraine) Oleksandr Bandura
DF	7	(Ukraine) Mykola Morozyuk
DF	4	(Ukraine) Vyacheslav Checher (c)	(yellow card) 81'
DF	14	(Ukraine) Oleksandr Volovyk	(yellow card) 69' (yellow-red card) 85'
DF	84	(Ukraine) Denys Holaydo
MF	13	(Cyprus) Constantinos Makrides
MF	9	(Serbia) Đorđe Lazić		(substituted off) 66'
MF	8	(Netherlands) Gregory Nelson
MF	18	(Bulgaria) Velizar Dimitrov		(substituted off) 81'
MF	17	(Brazil) Zé Soares		(substituted off) 46'
FW	10	(Armenia) Gevorg Ghazaryan
Substitutes:
GK	31	(Russia) Dmitriy Vorobyov
DF	2	(Ukraine) Artem Baranovskyi
DF	21	(Armenia) Artak Yedigaryan
MF	11	(Belgium) Danilo		(substituted in) 46'
MF	43	(Ukraine) Pavlo Hryshchenko
MF	44	(Ukraine) Vasyl Pryima		(substituted in) 66'
FW	19	(Ukraine) Vitaliy Ivanko		(substituted in) 81'
Manager :
	(Ukraine) Volodymyr Pyatenko

GK	30	(Ukraine) Andriy Pyatov
DF	33	(Croatia) Darijo Srna (c)
DF	44	(Ukraine) Yaroslav Rakitskyi	(yellow card) 63'
DF	5	(Ukraine) Oleksandr Kucher	(yellow card) 26'
DF	26	(Romania) Răzvan Raț
MF	6	(Ukraine) Taras Stepanenko	(yellow card) 60'
MF	7	(Brazil) Fernandinho
MF	20	(Brazil) Douglas Costa	35'	(substituted off) 65'
MF	29	(Brazil) Alex Teixeira		(substituted off) 77'
MF	22	(Armenia) Henrikh Mkhitaryan
FW	9	(Brazil) Luiz Adriano	6'	(substituted off) 65'
Substitutes:
GK	35	(Ukraine) Mykyta Shevchenko
DF	38	(Ukraine) Serhiy Kryvtsov
MF	3	(Czech Republic) Tomáš Hübschman
MF	77	(Brazil) Ilsinho		(substituted in) 65'
FW	11	(Croatia) Eduardo		(substituted in) 65'
FW	17	(Ukraine) Yevhen Seleznyov
FW	18	(Ukraine) Marko Devich	(yellow card) 85'	(substituted in) 77'
Manager :
	(Romania) Mircea Lucescu

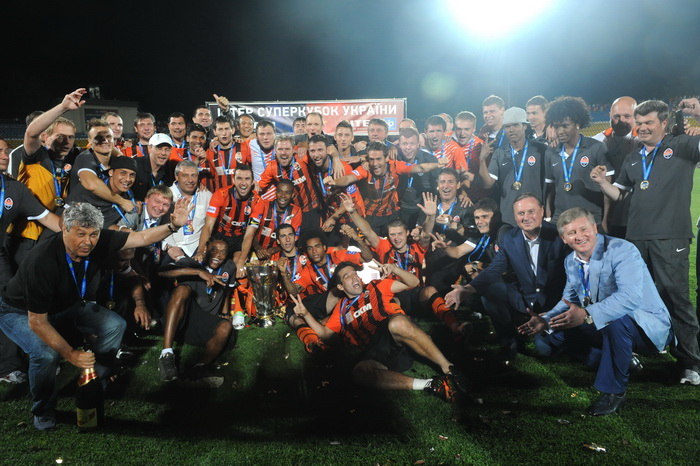
Henrikh Mkhitaryan sits by the cup
