= 2010 Ukrainian Cup final =

- Event: 2009–10 Ukrainian Cup
Tavriya Simeferopol	Metalurh Donetsk
3	2
- Date: 16 May 2010
- Venue: Metalist Stadium, Kharkiv
- Attendance: 21,000

The 2010 Ukrainian Cup final was a football match that was played place at the Metalist Stadium, Kharkiv, on 16 May 2010. The match was the 19th Ukrainian Cup final and was contested by Metalurh Donetsk and Tavriya Simferopol. The final was the second time a Ukrainian Cup final was held in Kharkiv. The Ukrainian Cup winners qualified for the 2010–11 UEFA Europa League play-off round. Tavriya played in their second cup final after last appearing in 1994, where the side lost to Chornomorets Odesa on penalty kicks (5–3) after the matched finished 0–0 after extra time. Metalurh Donetsk were playing in their first cup final.

== Road to Kharkiv ==
All 16 Ukrainian Premier League clubs do not have to go through qualification to get into the competition; Tavriya and Metalurh therefore both qualified automatically for the competition.

Tavriya Simferopol

Round 1	Stal Dniprodzerzhynsk	0–4	Tavriya Simferopol
Round 2	Tavriya Simferopol	4–2	Illichivets Mariupol
Quarter-final	Tavriya Simferopol	4–0	Obolon Kyiv
Semi-final	Volyn Lutsk	1–2	Tavriya Simferopol

Metalurh Donetsk

Round 1	Naftovyk-Ukrnafta Okhtyrka	1–1 aet 2–4 pen.	Metalurh Donetsk
Round 2	Metalurh Donetsk	2–1	Karpaty Lviv
Quarter-final	Dnipro Dnipropetrovsk	1–2 aet	Metalurh Donetsk
Semi-final	Metalurh Donetsk	2–1	Shakhtar Donetsk

== Previous encounters ==
Tavriya had met Metalurh Donetsk previously in the Ukrainian Cup competition in the quarter-Final of the 2003–04 edition. In that match, Tavriya advanced on penalty kicks 10–9 after the score finished 1–1 after extra time.

== Match details ==
2010-05-16
17:00 LST

Tavriya Simferopol	3 – 2 (aet)	Metalurh Donetsk
Feschuk 2'; Kovpak 40' (pen.); Idahor 97'	Report	Mkhitaryan 50'; Mário Sérgio 74'

Metalist Stadium, Kharkiv
Attendance: 21,000
Referee: Oleh Derevynsky

Tavriya Simferopol	Metalurh Donetsk

Tavriya Simferopol:
GK	1	(Ukraine) Maksym Startsev
DF	4	(Serbia) Slobodan Marković	(yellow card) 60' (yellow-red card) 120+1'
DF	5	(Croatia) Sasha Juričić	(yellow card) 90+6' (yellow-red card) 94'
MF	8	(Ukraine) Andriy Kornev	(yellow card) 26'
FW	9	(Ukraine) Oleksandr Kovpak (c)	40' (pen.)
DF	11	(Ukraine) Anton Monakhov	(yellow card) 99'
MF	15	(Ukraine) Yevhen Lutsenko	(yellow card) 28'
DF	19	(Ukraine) Ilya Galiuza	(yellow card) 79' (substituted off) 84'
MF	22	(Serbia) Željko Ljubenović	(substituted off) 70'
MF	27	(Ukraine) Denys Holaydo
MF	28	(Ukraine) Maksym Feschuk	2' (substituted off) 62'
Substitutes:
MF	10	(Nigeria) Lucky Idahor	(substituted in) 62' (yellow card) 66' (goal) 97'
FW	18	(Ukraine) Ivan Matyazh	(substituted in) 84'
FW	20	(Georgia (country)) Vasil Gigiadze	(substituted in) 70'
MF	21	(Ukraine) Maksym Syrota
FW	24	(Ukraine) Ruslan Platon
GK	12	(Ukraine) Dmytro Stoyko
FW	44	(Ukraine) Mamadi Sangare
Manager:
(Ukraine) Serhiy Puchkov

Metalurh Donetsk:
GK	66	(Ukraine) Vladimir Dišljenković
DF	4	(Ukraine) Vyacheslav Checher (c)
FW	7	(Zimbabwe) Musawengosi Mguni	(yellow card) 99'
DF	14	(Ukraine) Oleksandr Volovyk
MF	18	(Bulgaria) Velizar Dimitrov
FW	22	(Armenia) Henrikh Mkhitaryan	50'
DF	23	(Ukraine) Oleksiy Hodin
DF	28	(Portugal) Mário Sérgio	74' (yellow card) 117'
MF	44	(Ukraine) Vasyl Pryima	(substituted off) 67'
MF	39	(Nigeria) Sunny Kingsley	(substituted off) 75'
DF	88	(Brazil) William Boaventura	(yellow card) 66' (substituted off) 106'
Substitutes:
MF	9	(Serbia) Đorđe Lazić
MF	10	(Bulgaria) Chavdar Yankov	(substituted in) 67' (yellow card) 111'
FW	15	(Romania) Ciprian Tănasă	(substituted in) 106'
MF	17	(Brazil) Zé Soares	(substituted in) 75'
DF	27	(Portugal) China
GK	31	(Ukraine) Dmytro Vorobeyev
FW	46	(Ukraine) Vitaliy Ivanko
Manager:
(Bulgaria) Nikolay Kostov

MATCH OFFICIALS

- Assistant referees:
  - Stanislav Boklazhko
  - Serhiy Tsymbal
- Fourth official: Serhiy Dankovsky

MATCH RULES

- 90 minutes.
- 30 minutes of extra-time if necessary.
- Penalty shoot-out if scores still level.
- Seven named substitutes
- Maximum of 3 substitutions.

== See also ==
- 2009–10 Ukrainian Premier League
