= 2012 Ukrainian Cup final =

- Event: 2011–12 Ukrainian Cup
Metalurh Donetsk	Shakhtar Donetsk
1	2
- Date: 6 May 2012
- Venue: Olimpiysky NSC, Kyiv
- Referee: Anatoliy Abdula (Kharkiv)
- Attendance: 47,314

The 2012 Ukrainian Cup final was a football match that was played at the Olimpiysky NSC, Kyiv, on 6 May 2012. The match was the 21st Ukrainian Cup Final and was contested by Metalurh Donetsk and Shakhtar Donetsk. This was the first time since 2007 that the Cup final had returned to Kyiv. Since Shakhtar had qualified for the 2012–13 UEFA Champions League, Metalurh would qualify for the 2012–13 UEFA Europa League. In the draw, Metalurh was selected as the home team.

== Road to Kyiv ==
As Ukrainian Premier League members, Shakhtar Donetsk and Metalurh Donetsk did not have to go through the qualification phase of the competition.

Metalurh Donetsk

Round 1	Metalurh Donetsk	2–0	Tavriya Simferopol
Round 2	Metalurh Donetsk	4–0	Kryvbas Kryvyi Rih
Quarter-final	Zorya Luhansk	0–1 aet	Metalurh Donetsk
Semi-final	Metalurh Donetsk	0–0 aet 7–6 pen.	Karpaty Lviv

Shakhtar Donetsk

Round 1	Shakhtar Sverdlovsk	0–2	Shakhtar Donetsk
Round 2	Dynamo Kyiv	2–3	Shakhtar Donetsk
Quarter-final	Metalurh Zaporizhia	0–1	Shakhtar Donetsk
Semi-final	Volyn Lutsk	3–4	Shakhtar Donetsk

== Previous encounters ==
This was the first Ukrainian Cup final between the two teams. The two teams had also met in a semi-final in 2009–10 and in the Round of 16 in 1997–98 season in which Metalurh was able to overcome Shakhtar.

Metalurh had appeared only once in a Cup final without winning any trophies and their opponents Shakhtar had appeared in 11 Cup finals, winning seven.

== Television ==
The match was broadcast on ICTV in Ukraine.

== Match ==
=== Details ===
6 May 2012
19:30 EEST

Metalurh Donetsk	1 – 2 (aet)	Shakhtar Donetsk
Morozyuk 69'	Report	Teixeira 23'; Kucher 104'

Olimpiysky NSC, Kyiv
Attendance: 47,314
Referee: Anatoliy Abdula (Kharkiv)

Metalurh Donetsk	Shakhtar Donetsk

Metalurh Donetsk:
GK	12	(Ukraine) Oleksandr Bandura
DF	5	(Ukraine) Vyacheslav Checher (c)
MF	6	(Armenia) Karlen Mkrtchyan	(yellow card) 23'
MF	7	(Ukraine) Mykola Morozyuk	69'
MF	9	(Serbia) Đorđe Lazić
FW	10	(Armenia) Gevorg Ghazaryan	(yellow card) 25' (substituted off) 73'
DF	14	(Ukraine) Oleksandr Volovyk
FW	15	(Mali) Dramane Traoré
MF	17	(Brazil) Zé Soares	(yellow card) 80' (substituted off) 114'
MF	18	(Bulgaria) Velizar Dimitrov	(substituted off) 90'
MF	20	(Portugal) China
Substitutes:
GK	31	(Ukraine) Dmytro Vorobyov
DF	2	(Ukraine) Artem Baranovskyi
MF	8	(Netherlands) Gregory Nelson	(substituted on) 73'
MF	8	(Belgium) Danilo	(substituted on) 90'
FW	23	(Ukraine) Oleh Mishchenko	(substituted on) 114'
MF	28	(Portugal) Mário Sérgio
FW	84	(Ukraine) Denys Holaydo
Manager:
(Ukraine) Volodymyr Pyatenko

Shakhtar Donetsk:
GK	30	(Ukraine) Andriy Pyatov
DF	5	(Ukraine) Oleksandr Kucher	104'
MF	7	(Brazil) Fernandinho	(yellow card) 90+4'
MF	9	(Brazil) Luiz Adriano	(substituted off) 106'
FW	10	(Brazil) Willian
MF	19	(Ukraine) Oleksiy Gai	(substituted off) 107'
MF	22	(Armenia) Henrikh Mkhitaryan	(yellow card) 18' (substituted off) 62'
DF	26	(Romania) Răzvan Raț
MF	29	(Brazil) Alex Teixeira	23'
DF	33	(Croatia) Darijo Srna (c)
DF	44	(Ukraine) Yaroslav Rakitskiy
Substitutes:
GK	23	(Ukraine) Bohdan Shust
MF	14	(Ukraine) Vasyl Kobin
MF	15	(Ukraine) Taras Stepanenko	(substituted on) 107'
FW	17	(Ukraine) Yevhen Seleznyov	(substituted on) 106'
FW	20	(Brazil) Douglas Costa	(substituted on) 62'
FW	31	(Brazil) Dentinho
DF	36	(Ukraine) Oleksandr Chyzhov
Manager:
(Romania) Mircea Lucescu

MAN OF THE MATCH

MATCH OFFICIALS

- Assistant referees:
  - Oleksandr Korniyenko (Myrhorod)
  - Natalya Rachynska (Kyiv)
- Fourth official:
  - Dmytro Kulakov (Brovary)

MATCH RULES

- 90 minutes.
- 30 minutes of extra-time if necessary.
- Penalty shoot-out if scores still level.
- Seven named substitutes
- Maximum of 3 substitutions.

== Post-match ==
On account of Shakhtar's victory and Metalurh's defeat in the Ukrainian Cup final, and with both team finishing as "good as they could" in the 2011–12 Ukrainian Premier League, the 2012 Ukrainian Super Cup will feature Shakhtar Donetsk and Dynamo Kyiv.

== See also ==
- 2011–12 Ukrainian Premier League
