= 2012–13 FC Shakhtar Donetsk season =

Shakhtar Donetsk
2012–13 season
- Chairman: Rinat Akhmetov
- Manager: Mircea Lucescu
- Stadium: Donbas Arena
- Premier League: 1st
- Ukrainian Cup: Winners
- Super Cup: Winners
- UEFA Champions League: Round of 16
- Top goalscorer: League: Henrikh Mkhitaryan (25); All: Henrikh Mkhitaryan (29)
- Highest home attendance: 53,423 vs Dynamo Kyiv; 2 September 2012
- Lowest home attendance: 35,238 vs Hoverla Uzhhorod; 24 November 2012
- Average home league attendance: 43,475; 11 April 2013
Home colours	Away colours

The Shakhtar Donetsk 2012–13 season was Shakhtar's twenty second Ukrainian Premier League season, and they were the defending champions.

== Season events ==
In July, Shakhtar announced the signing of Maicon from Volyn Lutsk to a three-year contract.

On 31 July, Shakhtar announced that Anton Kanibolotskyi had joined the club six-months earlier than initially agreed, on a five-year contract.

In January, Shakhtar announced the signing of Taison from Metalist Kharkiv, to a five-year contract.

In February, Shakhtar announced the signing of Ismaily from Braga to a five year contract.

== Squad ==
As of match played 26 May 2013

Number	Name	Nationality	Position	Date of birth (age)	Signed from	Signed in	Contract ends	Apps.	Goals
Goalkeepers
30	Andriy Pyatov	(Ukraine)	GK	28 June 1984 (aged 28)	Vorskla Poltava	2007		213	0
32	Anton Kanibolotskyi	(Ukraine)	GK	16 May 1988 (aged 25)	Dnipro Dnipropetrovsk	2012	2017	10	0
35	Mykyta Shevchenko	(Ukraine)	GK	26 January 1993 (aged 20)	Academy	2011		0	0
Defenders
3	Tomáš Hübschman	(Czech Republic)	DF	4 September 1981 (aged 31)	Sparta Prague	2004		264	1
5	Oleksandr Kucher	(Ukraine)	DF	22 October 1982 (aged 30)	Metalist Kharkiv	2006		187	6
13	Vyacheslav Shevchuk	(Ukraine)	DF	13 May 1979 (aged 34)	Dnipro Dnipropetrovsk	2005		172	3
14	Vasyl Kobin	(Ukraine)	DF	24 May 1985 (aged 28)	Karpaty Lviv	2009		62	3
26	Răzvan Raț	(Romania)	DF	26 May 1981 (aged 32)	Rapid București	2003		313	12
27	Dmytro Chyhrynskyi (vice-captain)	(Ukraine)	DF	7 November 1986 (aged 26)	Barcelona	2010		180	14
31	Ismaily	(Brazil)	DF	11 January 1990 (aged 23)	Braga	2013	2017	1	1
33	Darijo Srna (Captain)	(Croatia)	DF	1 May 1982 (aged 31)	Hajduk Split	2003		375	31
38	Serhiy Kryvtsov	(Ukraine)	DF	15 March 1991 (aged 22)	Metalurh Zaporizhzhia	2010	2015	25	1
44	Yaroslav Rakitskyi	(Ukraine)	DF	3 August 1989 (aged 23)	Academy	2009		143	7
95	Eduard Sobol	(Ukraine)	DF	20 April 1995 (aged 18)	Metalurh Zaporizhzhia	2013		5	0
Midfielders
6	Taras Stepanenko	(Ukraine)	MF	8 August 1989 (aged 23)	Metalurh Zaporizhzhia	2010	2015	56	1
7	Fernandinho	(Brazil)	MF	4 May 1985 (aged 28)	Paranaense	2005	2016	283	52
19	Oleksiy Hai	(Ukraine)	MF	6 November 1982 (aged 30)	Illichivets Mariupol	2000		211	19
20	Douglas Costa	(Brazil)	MF	14 September 1990 (aged 22)	Grêmio	2010	2015	129	26
21	Alan Patrick	(Brazil)	MF	13 May 1991 (aged 22)	Santos	2011	2016	6	2
22	Henrikh Mkhitaryan	(Armenia)	MF	21 January 1989 (aged 24)	Metalurh Donetsk	2010	2015	105	42
25	Dmytro Hrechyshkin	(Ukraine)	MF	22 September 1991 (aged 21)	Academy	2008		7	0
28	Taison	(Brazil)	MF	17 January 1988 (aged 25)	Metalist Kharkiv	2013	2017	14	3
29	Alex Teixeira	(Brazil)	MF	6 January 1990 (aged 23)	Vasco da Gama	2010	2015	117	30
77	Ilsinho	(Brazil)	MF	12 October 1985 (aged 27)	São Paulo	2012	2015	131	21
Forwards
9	Luiz Adriano	(Brazil)	FW	12 April 1987 (aged 26)	Internacional	2007		193	80
11	Eduardo (Note: Eduardo was born in Rio de Janeiro, Brazil, but qualified to represent Croatia in 2002, representing them between 2004 and 2014.)	(Croatia)	FW	25 February 1983 (aged 30)	Arsenal	2010	2014	80	23
92	Pylyp Budkivskyi	(Ukraine)	FW	10 March 1992 (aged 21)	Illichivets Mariupol	2013		0	0
99	Maicon	(Brazil)	FW	8 May 1988 (aged 25)	Volyn Lutsk	2012	2015	4	1
Reserves
	Maksym Ivanov	(Ukraine)	GK	30 April 1991 (aged 22)	Academy	2008		0	0
	Mykyta Kryukov	(Ukraine)	GK	30 April 1991 (aged 22)	Academy	2008		0	0
	Artem Tetenko	(Ukraine)	GK	12 February 1991 (aged 22)	Academy	2007		0	0
	Mykyta Bezuhlyi	(Ukraine)	DF	1 August 1995 (aged 17)	Academy	2012		0	0
	Ihor Duts	(Ukraine)	DF	11 April 1994 (aged 19)	Academy	2011		0	0
	Mykhaylo Pysko	(Ukraine)	DF	19 March 1993 (aged 20)	UFK Lviv	2010		0	0
	Yevhen Yefremov	(Ukraine)	DF	17 January 1994 (aged 19)	Academy	2011		0	0
	Maksym Zhychykov	(Ukraine)	DF	7 November 1992 (aged 20)	Academy	2009		0	0
	Oleksiy Chereda	(Ukraine)	MF	18 April 1994 (aged 19)	Academy	2011		0	0
	Vyacheslav Churko	(Ukraine)	MF	10 May 1993 (aged 20)	Academy	2009		0	0
	Vitaliy Koltsov	(Ukraine)	MF	20 March 1994 (aged 19)	Academy	2011		0	0
	Oleksandr Noyok	(Ukraine)	MF	15 May 1992 (aged 21)	Academy	2009		0	0
	Vyacheslav Tankovskyi	(Ukraine)	MF	16 August 1995 (aged 17)	Academy	2008		0	0
	Serhiy Vakulenko	(Ukraine)	MF	7 September 1993 (aged 19)	Academy	2010		0	0
	Vladlen Yurchenko	(Ukraine)	MF	22 January 1994 (aged 19)	Academy	2010		0	0
	Leonid Akulinin	(Ukraine)	FW	7 March 1993 (aged 20)	Academy	2009		0	0
	Dmytro Bilonoh	(Ukraine)	FW	26 May 1995 (aged 18)	Academy	2012		0	0
	Serhiy Hryn	(Ukraine)	FW	6 June 1994 (aged 18)	Academy	2011		0	0
	Valeriy Hryshyn	(Ukraine)	FW	12 June 1994 (aged 18)	Academy	2011		0	0
	Vladyslav Kulach	(Ukraine)	FW	7 May 1993 (aged 20)	Academy	2010		0	0
	Vladyslav Nekhtiy (Note: Nekhtiy was born in Almaty, Kazakhstan, but qualified to represent Ukraine in 2008, representing their U-18 and U-19 in 2009.)	(Ukraine)	FW	19 December 1991 (aged 21)	Academy	2008		0	0
	Artur Zahorulko	(Ukraine)	FW	13 February 1993 (aged 20)	Academy	2011		0	0
Out on loan
31	Dentinho	(Brazil)	FW	19 January 1989 (aged 24)	Corinthians	2011	2016	25	3
	Bohdan Butko	(Ukraine)	DF	13 January 1991 (aged 22)	Academy	2008		0	0
	Oleksandr Chyzhov	(Ukraine)	DF	10 August 1986 (aged 26)	Vorskla Poltava	2008		36	0
	Yaroslav Oliynyk	(Ukraine)	DF	14 March 1991 (aged 22)	Academy	2008		0	0
	Mykola Ishchenko	(Ukraine)	DF	9 March 1983 (aged 30)	Karpaty Lviv	2008		59	0
	Bruno Renan	(Brazil)	MF	19 April 1991 (aged 22)	Villarreal	2010	2015	2	0
	Tornike Okriashvili	(Georgia (country))	MF	12 February 1992 (aged 21)	Gagra	2011		0	0
	David Targamadze	(Georgia (country))	MF	22 August 1989 (aged 23)	Oleksandriya	2011	2016	0	0
	Roman Yemelyanov	(Russia)	MF	8 May 1992 (aged 21)	Tolyatti	2010	2013	1	0
	Denys Kozhanov	(Ukraine)	MF	13 June 1987 (aged 25)	Academy	2005			
	Ruslan Malinovskyi	(Ukraine)	MF	4 May 1993 (aged 20)	Academy	2011		0	0
	Vladyslav Nasibulin	(Ukraine)	MF	6 July 1989 (aged 23)	Academy	2006			
	Oleksiy Polyanskyi	(Ukraine)	MF	12 April 1986 (aged 27)	Metalurh Donetsk	2006			
	Oleksandr Karavayev	(Ukraine)	FW	2 June 1992 (aged 20)	Academy	2005		0	0
	Vitaliy Vitsenets	(Ukraine)	FW	3 August 1990 (aged 22)	Academy	2010	2015	24	2
Players who left during the season
10	Willian	(Brazil)	MF	9 August 1988 (aged 24)	Corinthians	2007		222	36
17	Yevhen Seleznyov	(Ukraine)	FW	20 July 1985 (aged 27)	Academy	2011		61	28
18	Marko Dević (Note: Dević was born in Belgrade, SR Serbia, but qualified to represent Ukraine in 2008, representing them between 2008 and 2014.)	(Ukraine)	FW	27 October 1983 (aged 29)	Metalist Kharkiv	2012		16	4

=== Out on loan ===
Note: Flags indicate national team as defined under FIFA eligibility rules; some limited exceptions apply. Players may hold more than one non-FIFA nationality.

No.	Pos.	Nation	Player
—	DF	UKR	Oleksandr Chyzhov (on loan to Illichivets Mariupol)
—	DF	UKR	Bohdan Butko (on loan to Illichivets Mariupol)
—	MF	BRA	Bruno Renan (on loan to Criciúma)
—	MF	RUS	Roman Yemelyanov (on loan to Illichivets Mariupol)
—	MF	UKR	Denys Kozhanov (on loan to FC Sevastopol)
—	MF	UKR	Vitaliy Vitsenets (on loan to Illichivets Mariupol)
—	MF	GEO	David Targamadze (on loan to Illichivets Mariupol)

No.	Pos.	Nation	Player
—	MF	UKR	Vladyslav Nasibulin (on loan to Zirka Kirovohrad)
—	MF	UKR	Yaroslav Oliynyk (on loan to Zorya Luhansk)
—	MF	GEO	Tornike Okriashvili (on loan to Illichivets Mariupol)
—	MF	UKR	Ruslan Malinovskyi (on loan to FC Sevastopol)
—	FW	UKR	Oleksandr Karavayev (on loan to FC Sevastopol)
—	FW	BRA	Dentinho (on loan to Beşiktaş)

== Transfers ==
=== In ===
Date	Position	Nationality	Name	From	Fee	Ref.
1 July 2012	FW	(Ukraine)	Marko Dević	Metalist Kharkiv	Undisclosed	
30 July 2012	GK	(Ukraine)	Anton Kanibolotskyi	Dnipro Dnipropetrovsk	Undisclosed	
1 September 2012	FW	(Brazil)	Maicon	Volyn Lutsk	Undisclosed	
10 January 2013	FW	(Brazil)	Taison	Metalist Kharkiv	Undisclosed	
7 February 2013	MF	(Ukraine)	Eduard Sobol	Metalurh Zaporizhya	Undisclosed	
8 February 2013	MF	(Ukraine)	Dmytro Hrechyshkin	Illichivets Mariupol	Undisclosed	
14 February 2013	DF	(Brazil)	Ismaily	Braga	Undisclosed	

=== Out ===
Date	Position	Nationality	Name	To	Fee	Ref.
1 July 2012	MF	(Ukraine)	Ihor Chaykovskyi	Illichivets Mariupol	Undisclosed	
1 July 2012	MF	(Ukraine)	Maksym Kovalyov	Illichivets Mariupol	Undisclosed	
6 July 2012	MF	(Ukraine)	Kostyantyn Kravchenko	Illichivets Mariupol	Undisclosed	
31 August 2012	DF	(Ukraine)	Artem Fedetskiy	Dnipro Dnipropetrovsk	Undisclosed	
31 January 2013	MF	(Brazil)	Willian	Anzhi Makhachkala	Undisclosed	
28 February 2013	FW	(Ukraine)	Marko Dević	Metalist Kharkiv	Undisclosed	
12 January 2013	GK	(Ukraine)	Bohdan Shust	Metalist Kharkiv	Undisclosed	

=== Loans out ===
Date From	Position	Nationality	Name	To	Date To	Ref.
1 July 2011	DF	(Ukraine)	Bohdan Butko	Illichivets Mariupol	31 December 2014	
4 September 2012	FW	(Brazil)	Maicon	Volyn Lutsk	31 December 2012	
1 January 2013	DF	(Ukraine)	Oleksiy Polyanskiy	Illichivets Mariupol	31 May 2014	
24 January 2013	FW	(Brazil)	Dentinho	Beşiktaş	31 December 2013	
1 March 2013	MF	(Brazil)	Bruno Renan	Criciúma	31 December 2013	

== Friendlies ==
16 January 2013	Shakhtar Donetsk (Ukraine)	3–2	(Egypt) Zamalek	Abu Dhabi, United Arab Emirates
17:00 EET (UTC+3)		[ Summary]		Stadium: Sheikh Zayed Stadium

19 January 2013	Shakhtar Donetsk (Ukraine)	3–2	(Saudi Arabia) Al-Hilal	Abu Dhabi, United Arab Emirates
20:00 EET (UTC+3)		[ Summary]		Stadium: Sheikh Zayed Stadium

22 January 2013	Zenit St. Petersburg (Russia)	1–3	(Ukraine) Shakhtar Donetsk	Abu Dhabi, United Arab Emirates
18:00 EET (UTC+3)	Zyryanov (1st Half)	[ Summary]	Hubočan (1st Half); Mkhitaryan (1st Half); Eduardo (2nd Half)	Stadium: Sheikh Zayed Stadium

=== Copa del Sol ===
25 January 2013 Group Stage	Göteborg (Sweden)	1–2	(Ukraine) Shakhtar Donetsk	La Manga, Spain
20:00 EET (UTC+2)	Rakytskiy 61'; Taison 85'	[ Summary]	Moberg Karlsson 72'	Stadium: La Manga Stadium; Referee: Ken Henry Johnsen (Norway)

28 January 2013 Group Stage	Rosenborg (Norway)	0–1	(Ukraine) Shakhtar Donetsk	La Manga, Spain
20:00 EET (UTC+2)		[ Summary]	Douglas Costa 79'	Stadium: La Manga Stadium; Referee: Mattias Gestranius (Finland)

31 January 2013 Group Stage	CSKA Moscow (Russia)	0–2	(Ukraine) Shakhtar Donetsk	La Manga, Spain
17:00 EET (UTC+2)		Report	Mkhitaryan 47'; Luiz Adriano 61'	Stadium: La Manga Stadium; Referee: Ransin Djurhuus (Faroe Islands)

2 February 2013 Final	Shakhtar Donetsk (Ukraine)	2–1	(Poland) Widzew Łódź	La Manga, Spain
17:00 EET (UTC+2)	Mkhitaryan 18'; Eduardo 82'	Report	Pawłowski 90+3'	Stadium: La Manga Stadium; Referee: Mattias Gestranius (Finland)

== Competitions ==
=== Overall ===
Competition	First match	Last match	Starting round	Final position	Record							
Competition	First match	Last match	Starting round	Final position	Pld	W	D	L	GF	GA	GD	Win %
Premier League	15 July 2012	26 May 2013	Matchday 1	Champions	30	25	4	1	80	18	+62	83.33
Ukrainian Cup	22 September 2012	22 May 2013	Round of 32	Champions	5	5	0	0	19	5	+14	100.00
Super Cup	10 July 2012		Final	Champions	1	1	0	0	2	0	+2	100.00
UEFA Champions League	19 September 2012	5 March 2013	Group Stage	Round of 16	8	3	2	3	14	13	+1	37.50
Total					44	34	6	4	115	36	+79	77.27

Last updated: 22 May 2013
Source: Results

=== Supercup ===
10 July 2012	Metalurh Donetsk	0–2	Shakhtar Donetsk	Avanhard Stadium
21:00 EEST (UTC+3)	Volovyk (yellow card) 69' (yellow-red card) 85'; Checher (yellow card) 81'	Summary	Luiz Adriano 6'; Kucher (yellow card) 26'; Douglas Costa 35'; Stepanenko (yellow card) 60'; Rakytskiy (yellow card) 63'; Dević (yellow card) 85'	Attendance: 2,150; Referee: Anatoliy Abdula

=== Premier League ===
==== Results summary ====
Overall								Home						Away					
Pld	W	D	L	GF	GA	GD	Pts	W	D	L	GF	GA	GD	W	D	L	GF	GA	GD
30	25	4	1	79	18	+61	79	14	1	0	45	7	+38	11	3	1	34	11	+23

Last updated: 28 May 2013.
Source: Soccerway

==== Results by round ====
Round	1	2	3	4	5	6	7	8	9	10	11	12	13	14	15	16	17	18	19	20	21	22	23	24	25	26	27	28	29	30
Ground	H	A	H	A	H	A	H	H	A	H	A	H	A	H	A	A	H	A	H	A	H	A	A	H	A	H	A	H	A	H
Result	W	W	W	W	W	W	W	W	W	W	W	W	W	W	W	L	W	W	W	W	W	W	W	W	D	D	D	W	D	W
Position	1	1	1	1	1	1	1	1	1	1	1	1	1	1	1	1	1	1	1	1	1	1	1	1	1	1	1	1	1	1

Updated to match(es) played on 28 May 2013. Source: Soccerway
A = Away; H = Home; W = Win; D = Draw; L = Loss

==== Matches ====
15 July 2012 1	Shakhtar Donetsk	6–0	Arsenal Kyiv	Donetsk
19:00 EEST (UTC+3)	Mkhitaryan 13', 31'; Seleznyov 34'; Teixeira 39'; Ilsinho 66'; Dević 90+4'	Summary	Mikoliūnas (yellow card) 8'; Santos (yellow card) 85'	Stadium: Donbas Arena; Attendance: 39,263; Referee: Yuri Mozharovskiy

21 July 2012 2	Hoverla Uzhhorod	1–3	Shakhtar Donetsk	Uzhhorod
17:00 EEST (UTC+3)	Kosyrin (yellow card) 26'; Raičević (yellow card) 42' (goal) 85'; Trukhin (yellow card) 53'	Summary	Eduardo (yellow card) 45+1'; Mkhitaryan 51'; Ilsinho 52'; Seleznyov 90+3'	Stadium: Avanhard Stadium; Attendance: 5,100; Referee: Kostyantin Trukhanov

29 July 2012 3	Shakhtar Donetsk	1–0	Kryvbas	Donetsk
19:00 EEST (UTC+3)	Kucher (red card) 15'; Srna (yellow card) 15'; Seleznyov (yellow card) 67'; Fernandinho 90+3'	Summary	Lysytskyi (yellow card) 36' (yellow-red card) 49'; Bartulović (yellow card) 19' (yellow-red card) 62'; Fedoriv (yellow card) 41'; Shtanko (yellow card) 90+2'	Stadium: Donbas Arena; Attendance: 38,756; Referee: Sergiy Boyko

6 August 2012 4	Volyn Lutsk	0–4	Shakhtar Donetsk	Lutsk
19:00 EEST (UTC+3)	Skoba (yellow card) 50'; Zanev (yellow card) 75'	Summary	Dević 4'; Mkhitaryan 32', 51'; Teixeira 42'	Stadium: Avanhard Stadium; Attendance: 10,000; Referee: Yevhen Aranovskiy

12 August 2012 5	Shakhtar Donetsk	4–1	Vorskla Poltava	Donetsk
19:00 EEST (UTC+3)	Mkhitaryan 8', 58'; Dević 18'; Willian (yellow card) 56'; Fernandinho (yellow card) 65'; Teixeira 69'	Summary	Januzi (yellow card) 33' (goal) 38'; Yeremenko (yellow card) 60'	Stadium: Donbas Arena; Attendance: 39,075; Referee: Andriy Kuzmin

19 August 2012 6	Chornomorets Odesa	1–5	Shakhtar Donetsk	Odesa
21:00 EEST (UTC+3)	Léo Matos (yellow card) 37'; Berger (yellow card) 75'; Didenko 90+3'	Summary	Mkhitaryan 3', 84', 86'; Teixeira 64'; Raț (yellow card) 78'; Willian 80'	Stadium: Chornomorets Stadium; Attendance: 34,028; Referee: Yaroslav Kozyk

26 August 2012 7	Shakhtar Donetsk	3–0	Karpaty Lviv	Donetsk
19:00 EEST (UTC+3)	Luiz Adriano (yellow card) 25' (goal) 39'; Dentinho 31'; Mkhitaryan 41'; Kryvtsov (yellow card) 85'	Summary	Khudobyak (yellow card) 24'; Kopolovets (yellow card) 52'; Tkachuk (yellow card) 60'	Stadium: Donbas Arena; Attendance: 49,504; Referee: Yuriy Moseychuk

2 September 2012 8	Shakhtar Donetsk	3–1	Dynamo Kyiv	Donetsk
19:30 EEST (UTC+3)	Kucher 19', 62'; Mkhitaryan (yellow card) 53'; Luiz Adriano 81'; Fernandinho (yellow card) 72'; Raț (yellow card) 83'	Summary	Ideye (yellow card) 35'; Yarmolenko 45' (yellow card) 46'; Silva (yellow card) 76'; Harmash (yellow card) 84'; Veloso (yellow card) 86'; Betão (yellow card) 90+4'	Stadium: Donbas Arena; Attendance: 53,423; Referee: Anatoliy Abdula

15 September 2012 9	Zorya Luhansk	0–3	Shakhtar Donetsk	Luhansk
19:00 EEST (UTC+3)	Hrytsay (yellow card) 20'	Summary	Teixeira 41'; Mkhitaryan 62'; Luiz Adriano 65'; Shevchuk (yellow card) 82'	Stadium: Avanhard Stadium; Attendance: 18,000; Referee: Yuri Mozharovskiy

28 September 2012 10	Shakhtar Donetsk	2–1	Dnipro	Donetsk
19:30 EEST (UTC+3)	Srna (yellow card) 13' (goal) 80'; Mkhitaryan (yellow card) 13' (goal) 19'; Stepanenko (yellow card) 38' (yellow-red card) 89'; Fernandinho (yellow card) 52'	Summary	Rotan 9' (yellow card) 86'; Cheberyachko (yellow card) 46' (yellow-red card) 60'; Kankava (yellow card) 79'; Zozulya (yellow card) 89'; Laštůvka (yellow card) 89'	Stadium: Donbas Arena; Attendance: 47,487; Referee: Sergei Boyko

7 October 2012 11	Metalist Kharkiv	0–2	Shakhtar Donetsk	Kharkiv
19:30 EEST (UTC+3)	Blanco (yellow card) 19'; Sharpar (yellow card) 61'; Cristaldo (yellow card) 68'	Summary	Willian (yellow card) 20'; Mkhitaryan 25'; Fernandinho (yellow card) 37'; Ilsinho 42'; Kucher (yellow card) 82'	Stadium: Metalist Oblast Sports Complex; Attendance: 40,003; Referee: Vitaliy Godulyan

19 October 2012 12	Shakhtar Donetsk	2–1	Illichivets	Donetsk
19:00 EEST (UTC+3)	Ilsinho 48'; Chyhrynskyi 53'; Stepanenko (yellow card) 57'; Mkhitaryan (yellow card) 84'	Summary	Fomin 37'	Stadium: Donbas Arena; Attendance: 39,712; Referee: Andriy Kuzmin

27 October 2012 13	Tavriya Simferopol	0–1	Shakhtar Donetsk	Simferopol
16:30 EEST (UTC+3)	Ljubičić (yellow card) 27'; Humenyuk (yellow card) 43'; Shynder (yellow card) 52'; Romanchuk (yellow card) 78'	Summary	Srna (yellow card) 26'; Teixeira 49'; Mkhitaryan (yellow card) 61'	Stadium: RSC Lokomotiv; Attendance: 14,100; Referee: Victor Shvetsov

3 November 2012 14	Shakhtar Donetsk	2–0	Metalurh Zaporizhya	Donetsk
17:00 EET (UTC+2)	Douglas Costa 20' (pen.); Ilsinho (yellow card) 54'; Luiz Adriano 82'	Summary	Sobol (yellow card) 11'; Ben Othman (yellow card) 41'	Stadium: Donbas Arena; Attendance: 36,275; Referee: Yury Grisjo

11 November 2012 15	Metalurh Donetsk	0–4	Shakhtar Donetsk	Donetsk
16:00 EET (UTC+2)	Makrides (yellow card) 90+3'	Summary	Eduardo 10'; Mkhitaryan 23', 37'; Teixeira 90+1'; Willian (yellow card) 90+3'	Stadium: Metalurh Stadium; Attendance: 4,500; Referee: Yuri Mozharovskiy

17 November 2012 16	Arsenal Kyiv	2–0	Shakhtar Donetsk	Kyiv
19:30 EET (UTC+2)	Shatskikh 34'; Adiyiah (yellow card) 58'; Pankiv (yellow card) 82'; Shakhov (yellow card) 84'; Kobakhidze 90+3'	Summary	Rakytskiy (red card) 48'; Stepanenko (yellow card) 76'	Stadium: Valeriy Lobanovskyi; Attendance: 3,050; Referee: Olexander Derdo

24 November 2012 17	Shakhtar Donetsk	5–1	Hoverla Uzhhorod	Donetsk
16:00 EET (UTC+2)	Ilsinho 5'; Willian 13'; Mkhitaryan 17'; Douglas Costa 62'; Dević 80'; Dentinho (yellow card) 90+1'	Summary	Le Tallec 45'; Todorov (yellow card) 79'; Mališić (yellow card) 90'	Stadium: Donbas Arena; Attendance: 35,238; Referee: Victor Shvetsov

30 November 2012 18	Kryvbas	0–2	Shakhtar Donetsk	Kryvyi Rih
19:00 EET (UTC+2)	Dedechko (yellow card) 67'; Antonov (red card) 69'	Summary	Mkhitaryan 29'; Teixeira 47'; Fernandinho (yellow card) 50' (yellow-red card) 52'	Stadium: Metalurh Stadium; Attendance: 6,250; Referee: Anatoliy Zhabchenko

1 March 2013 19	Shakhtar Donetsk	4–1	Volyn Lutsk	Donetsk
19:00 EET (UTC+2)	Shandruk 10' (o.g.); Luiz Adriano (yellow card) 11'; Kucher 14' (yellow card) 60'; Douglas Costa 54'; Eduardo 90+2'	Summary	Izvoranu (yellow card) 40'; Bicfalvi 51'; Iliev (yellow card) 59'; Subotić (yellow card) 67'; Litovchenko (yellow card) 90+3'	Stadium: Donbas Arena; Attendance: 37,721; Referee: Yuriy Moseychuk

10 March 2013 20	Vorskla Poltava	0–1	Shakhtar Donetsk	Poltava
16:00 EET (UTC+2)	Hromov (yellow card) 38'; Perduta (yellow card) 43'; Dallku (yellow card) 54'; Lagos (yellow card) 66'	Summary	Luiz Adriano 19'; Stepanenko (yellow card) 71'; Kryvtsov (yellow card) 89'	Stadium: Oleksiy Butovskyi Vorskla Stadium; Attendance: 6,050; Referee: Sergiy Boyko

16 March 2013 21	Shakhtar Donetsk	3–0	Chornomorets	Donetsk
16:00 EET (UTC+2)	Srna (yellow card) 23'; Fernandinho 42'; Rakitskiy (yellow card) 55'; Mkhitaryan 59'; Luiz Adriano 73'	Summary	Dja Djédjé (yellow card) 70'	Stadium: Donbas Arena; Attendance: 35,273; Referee: Anatoliy Zhabchenko

30 March 2013 22	Karpaty Lviv	1–2	Shakhtar Donetsk	Lviv
19:30 EET (UTC+2)	Zhovtyuk 44' (red card) 70'; Daushvili (yellow card) 62' (yellow-red card) 81'; Khudobyak (yellow card) 90+3'; Ozarkiv (yellow card) 90+5'	Summary	Teixeira 32' (yellow card) 90+2' (yellow-red card) 90+7'; Fernandinho (yellow card) 44'; Rakytskiy 45+2' (yellow card) 47'	Stadium: Arena Lviv; Attendance: 22,460; Referee: Yevhen Aranovskiy

7 April 2013 23	Dynamo Kyiv	1–2	Shakhtar Donetsk	Kyiv
19:30 EEST (UTC+3)	Yarmolenko 10' (yellow card) 15'; Haruna (yellow card) 13'; Silva (yellow card) 23'	Summary	Stepanenko (yellow card) 18'; Rakytskiy (yellow card) 28' (yellow-red card) 90'; Fernandinho (yellow card) 42'; Mkhitaryan 44', 75'	Stadium: Olimpiyskiy National Sports Complex; Attendance: 66,837; Referee: Vitaliy Godulyan

13 April 2013 24	Shakhtar Donetsk	3–0	Zorya	Donetsk
16:00 EEST (UTC+3)	Kryvtsov (yellow card) 68' (goal) 81'; Mkhitaryan 89'; Luiz Adriano 90+2'	Summary	Halyuza (yellow card) 25'	Stadium: Donbas Arena; Attendance: 38,451; Referee: Vitaliy Romanov

21 April 2013 25	Dnipro Dnipropetrovsk	1–1	Shakhtar Donetsk	Dnipropetrovsk
19:30 EEST (UTC+3)	Matheus 13' (yellow card) 14'; Kravchenko (yellow card) 27'	Summary	Rakytskiy (yellow card) 9'; Shevchuk (yellow card) 28'; Kucher (yellow card) 48'; Fernandinho (yellow card) 53'; Srna (yellow card) 55' (goal) 62' (pen.)	Stadium: Dnipro Arena; Attendance: 30,530; Referee: Yuri Mozharovskiy

28 April 2013 26	Shakhtar Donetsk	1–1	Metalist Kharkiv	Donetsk
17:00 EEST (UTC+3)	Srna (yellow card) 40'; Fernandinho (yellow card) 70'; Ilsinho 84'	Summary	Dević 39'; Sosa (yellow card) 41'; Cleiton Xavier (yellow card) 70'	Stadium: Donbas Arena; Attendance: 48,237; Referee: Vitaliy Godulyan

4 May 2013 27	Illichivets Mariupol	1–1	Shakhtar Donetsk	Mariupol
16:00 EEST (UTC+3)	Yemelyanov (yellow card) 59'; Mandzyuk 73'; S.Yavorskiy (yellow card) 75'; Polyanskiy (yellow card) 83'	Summary	Patrick 13'; Mkhitaryan (yellow card) 72'	Stadium: Illichivets Stadium; Attendance: 7,500; Referee: Sergiy Skrypak

11 May 2013 28	Shakhtar Donetsk	5–0	Tavriya Simferopol	Donetsk
18:30 EEST (UTC+3)	Douglas Costa 7'; Teixeira 38'; Maicon 41'; Mkhitaryan 74', 80' (pen.)	Summary	Boussaïdi (yellow card) 79'	Stadium: Donbas Arena; Attendance: 31,017; Referee: Ivan Bondar

19 May 2013 29	Metalurh Zaporizhya	3–3	Shakhtar Donetsk	Zaporizhia
13:30 EEST (UTC+3)	Jokić 14'; Junior 62'; Pisotskyi 69'; Matyazh (yellow card) 82'	Summary	Ismaily 33'; Eduardo (yellow card) 41' (goal) 75'; Kobin (yellow card) 50'; Taison 90+3'	Stadium: Slavutych-Arena; Attendance: 8,500; Referee: Sergiy Lysenchuk

26 May 2013 30	Shakhtar Donetsk	4–0	Metalurh Donetsk	Donetsk
18:00 EEST (UTC+3)	Douglas Costa 24'; Taison (yellow card) 39' (goal) 74'; Mkhitaryan 49'; Eduardo (yellow card) 62' (goal) 87'; Stepanenko (yellow card) 65'; Srna (yellow card) 73'	Summary	Checher (yellow card) 64'; Moraes (yellow card) 71'; Mkrtchyan (yellow card) 76'; Danilo (yellow card) 82'	Stadium: Donbas Arena; Attendance: 48,617; Referee: Victor Shvetsov

==== League table ====
Pos	Team	Pld	W	D	L	GF	GA	GD	Pts	Qualification or relegation
1	Shakhtar Donetsk (C)	30	25	4	1	82	18	+64	79	Qualification for the Champions League group stage
2	Metalist Kharkiv	30	20	6	4	59	25	+34	66	Qualification for the Champions League third qualifying round
3	Dynamo Kyiv	30	20	2	8	55	23	+32	62	Qualification for the Europa League play-off round
4	Dnipro Dnipropetrovsk	30	16	8	6	54	27	+27	56	Qualification for the Europa League play-off round
5	Metalurh Donetsk	30	14	7	9	45	35	+10	49	Qualification for the Europa League third qualifying round

Source: uafootball.net.ua
Rules for classification: 1st points; 2nd goal difference; 3rd goals scored; 4th head-to-head points; 5th head-to-head goal difference; 6th head-to-head goals scored; 7th fair play; 8th draw (Regulation, p.52-53).
(C) Champions

=== Ukrainian Cup ===
22 September 2012 Round of 32	Shakhtar Donetsk	4–1	Dynamo Kyiv	Donetsk
19:30 EEST (UTC+3)	Luiz Adriano 22' (yellow card) 70'; Teixeira 40'; Fernandinho (yellow card) 42' (goal) 76'; Srna 83'; Stepanenko (yellow card) 87'	Summary	Taiwo 27'; Yarmolenko (yellow card) 38'; Khacheridi (yellow card) 47'; Vukojević (yellow card) 70'; Milevskyi (yellow card) 90+2'	Stadium: Donbas Arena; Attendance: 47,571; Referee: Anatoliy Zhabchenko

31 October 2012 Round of 16	Hoverla Uzhhorod	1–4	Shakhtar Donetsk	Uzhhorod
19:15 EET (UTC+2)	Yedigaryan (yellow card) 20'; López 55' (pen.); Mališić (yellow card) 49'; E.Makarenko (yellow card) 75'	Summary	Fernandinho 48'; Teixeira 68'; Luiz Adriano 72'; Willian 75' (pen.)	Stadium: Avanhard Stadium; Attendance: 8,000; Referee: Kostyantyn Trukhanov

17 April 2013 Quarterfinal	Shakhtar Donetsk	2–1	Karpaty Lviv	Donetsk
19:00 EEST (UTC+3)	Hübschman (yellow card) 22'; Gai 33'; Teixeira 42'	Summary	Kenia (yellow card) 19'; Zenjov 79' (pen.); Harashchenkov (yellow card) 87'	Stadium: Donbas Arena; Attendance: 29,312; Referee: Serhiy Berezka

8 May 2013 Semifinal	Sevastopol	2–4	Shakhtar Donetsk	Sevastopol
EEST (UTC+3)	Tkachev 37', 72' Mikoliūnas (yellow card) 43'; Ghvinianidze (yellow card) 87'	Summary	Luiz Adriano 8', 65'; Mkhitaryan 19', 53'; Srna (yellow card) 61'; Teixeira (yellow card) 75'	Stadium: Sevastopol Sports Complex; Attendance: 5,576; Referee: Yuriy Mozharovsky

22 May 2013 Final	Shakhtar Donetsk	3–0	Chornomorets Odesa	Kharkiv
19:45 EEST (UTC+3)	Fernandinho 41'; Teixeira 53'; Shevchuk (yellow card) 57'; Taison 73'; Douglas Costa (yellow card) 90'; Srna (yellow card) 90+1'	Summary	Burdujan (yellow card) 66'; Didenko (yellow card) 68'; Bakaj (yellow card) 73'	Stadium: Metalist Stadium; Attendance: 40,003; Referee: Yevhen Aranovskiy

=== UEFA Champions League ===
==== Group stage ====
Group E
Team	Pld	W	D	L	GF	GA	GD	Pts
(Italy) Juventus	6	3	3	0	12	4	+8	12
(Ukraine) Shakhtar Donetsk	6	3	1	2	12	8	+4	10
(England) Chelsea	6	3	1	2	16	10	+6	10
(Denmark) Nordsjælland	6	0	1	5	4	22	−18	1

Head-to-head record

Team	Pld	W	D	L	GF	GA	GD	AG	Pts
(Ukraine) Shakhtar Donetsk	2	1	0	1	4	4	0	2	3
(England) Chelsea	2	1	0	1	4	4	0	1	3

19 September 2012 1	Shakhtar Donetsk (Ukraine)	2–0	(Denmark) Nordsjælland	Donetsk, Ukraine
21:45 EEST (UTC+3)	Luiz Adriano (yellow card) 36'; Mkhitaryan 44', 76'; Srna (yellow card) 68'	Report	Christensen (yellow card) 42'; Lorentzen (yellow card) 59'; John (yellow card) 78'; Mtiliga (yellow card) 82'	Stadium: Donbas Arena; Attendance: 45,713; Referee: Paweł Gil (Poland)

2 October 2012 2	Juventus (Italy)	1–1	(Ukraine) Shakhtar Donetsk	Turin, Italy
21:45 EEST (UTC+3)	Bonucci 25'; Lichtsteiner (yellow card) 43'; Chiellini (yellow card) 71'	Report	Teixeira 23'; Hübschman (yellow card) 76'; Ilsinho (yellow card) 90+1'	Stadium: Juventus Stadium; Attendance: 29,368; Referee: Bas Nijhuis (Netherlands)

23 October 2012 3	Shakhtar Donetsk (Ukraine)	2–1	(England) Chelsea	Donetsk, Ukraine
21:45 EEST (UTC+3)	Teixeira 3'; Fernandinho 52'; Kucher (yellow card) 67'; Hübschman (yellow card) 86'	Report	Cole (yellow card) 22'; David Luiz (yellow card) 80'; Oscar 88'	Stadium: Donbas Arena; Attendance: 51,435; Referee: Damir Skomina (Slovenia)

7 November 2012 4	Chelsea (England)	3–2	(Ukraine) Shakhtar Donetsk	London, England
21:45 EET (UTC+2)	Torres 6'; Oscar 40'; David Luiz (yellow card) 89'; Moses 90+4'	Report	Willian 9', 47'; Teixeira (yellow card) 57'	Stadium: Stamford Bridge; Attendance: 41,067; Referee: Carlos Velasco Carballo (Spain)

20 November 2012 5	Nordsjælland (Denmark)	2–5	(Ukraine) Shakhtar Donetsk	Copenhagen, Denmark
21:45 EET (UTC+2)	Nordstrand 24'; Lorentzen 29'; Christiansen (yellow card) 90'; Parkhurst (yellow card) 90+2'	Report	Luiz Adriano 26', 53', 81' (yellow card) 67'; Willian 44', 50'	Stadium: Parken Stadium; Attendance: 17,054; Referee: Antony Gautier (France)
Note: FC Nordsjælland played their home matches at Parken Stadium, Copenhagen instead of their own Farum Park.

5 December 2012 6	Shakhtar Donetsk (Ukraine)	0–1	(Italy) Juventus	Donetsk, Ukraine
21:45 EET (UTC+2)	Stepanenko (yellow card) 20'; Eduardo (yellow card) 30'; Kucher (yellow card) 40'; Mkhitaryan (yellow card) 71'	Report	Vidal (yellow card) 8'; Kucher 56' (o.g.); Chiellini (yellow card) 87'	Stadium: Donbas Arena; Attendance: 50,104; Referee: Jonas Eriksson (Sweden)

==== Knockout phase ====
13 February 2013 Round of 16 First leg	Shakhtar Donetsk (Ukraine)	2–2	(Germany) Borussia Dortmund	Donetsk, Ukraine
21:45 EET (UTC+2)	Srna 31'; Douglas Costa 68'; Fernandinho (yellow card) 69'	Report	Lewandowski 41'; Hummels 87'	Stadium: Donbas Arena; Attendance: 49,050; Referee: Howard Webb (England)

5 March 2013 Round of 16 Second leg	Borussia Dortmund (Germany)	3–0 (5–2 agg.)	(Ukraine) Shakhtar Donetsk	Dortmund, Germany
21:45 EET (UTC+2)	Santana 31'; Götze 37'; Błaszczykowski 59'	Report	Kucher (yellow card) 15'	Stadium: Signal Iduna Park; Attendance: 65,413; Referee: Damir Skomina (Slovenia)

== Squad statistics ==
As of 28 May 2013

=== Appearances and goals ===
No.	Pos	Nat	Player	Total		Premier League		Ukrainian Cup		Champions League		Supercup	
No.	Pos	Nat	Player	Apps	Goals	Apps	Goals	Apps	Goals	Apps	Goals	Apps	Goals
3	MF	(Czech Republic) CZE	Tomáš Hübschman	17	0	8+1	0	2	0	6	0	0	0
5	DF	(Ukraine) UKR	Oleksandr Kucher	26	2	15+1	2	2	0	7	0	1	0
6	MF	(Ukraine) UKR	Taras Stepanenko	24	0	17+1	0	1+1	0	2+1	0	1	0
7	MF	(Brazil) BRA	Fernandinho	35	5	23	2	2+1	2	8	1	1	0
9	FW	(Brazil) BRA	Luiz Adriano	30	13	17+2	7	3	2	7	3	1	1
11	FW	(Croatia) CRO	Eduardo	25	4	13+6	4	0+2	0	1+2	0	0+1	0
13	DF	(Ukraine) UKR	Vyacheslav Shevchuk	17	0	14	0	3	0	0	0	0	0
14	MF	(Ukraine) UKR	Vasyl Kobin	5	0	4+1	0	0	0	0	0	0	0
17	FW	(Brazil) BRA	Maicon	4	1	3+1	1	0	0	0	0	0	0
19	MF	(Ukraine) UKR	Oleksiy Gai	7	0	4+2	0	1	0	0	0	0	0
20	MF	(Brazil) BRA	Douglas Costa	34	7	18+8	5	0+2	0	0+5	1	1	1
21	MF	(Brazil) BRA	Alan Patrick	4	1	1+3	1	0	0	0	0	0	0
22	MF	(Armenia) ARM	Henrikh Mkhitaryan	41	27	27+2	25	3	0	8	2	1	0
25	MF	(Ukraine) UKR	Dmytro Hrechyshkin	7	0	5+2	0	0	0	0	0	0	0
26	DF	(Romania) ROU	Răzvan Raț	25	0	15+1	0	0	0	8	0	1	0
27	DF	(Ukraine) UKR	Dmytro Chyhrynskyi	13	1	10+1	1	1	0	1	0	0	0
28	MF	(Brazil) BRA	Taison	14	3	7+4	2	1	1	2	0	0	0
29	MF	(Brazil) BRA	Alex Teixeira	38	16	16+10	10	3	4	7+1	2	1	0
30	GK	(Ukraine) UKR	Andriy Pyatov	33	0	21+1	0	2	0	8	0	1	0
31	DF	(Brazil) BRA	Ismaily	1	1	1	1	0	0	0	0	0	0
32	GK	(Ukraine) UKR	Anton Kanibolotskyi	10	0	9	0	1	0	0	0	0	0
33	DF	(Croatia) CRO	Darijo Srna	38	4	25+1	2	3	1	8	1	1	0
38	DF	(Ukraine) UKR	Sergiy Kryvtsov	16	1	12+3	1	1	0	0	0	0	0
44	DF	(Ukraine) UKR	Yaroslav Rakitskiy	35	1	23+1	1	2	0	8	0	1	0
77	MF	(Brazil) BRA	Ilsinho	28	6	10+10	6	0+1	0	1+5	0	0+1	0
95	DF	(Ukraine) UKR	Eduard Sobol	5	0	0+5	0	0	0	0	0	0	0
Players away from the club on loan:
31	FW	(Brazil) BRA	Dentinho	5	0	2+2	0	1	0	0	0	0	0
Players who appeared for Shakhtar who left the club during the season:
10	FW	(Brazil) BRA	Willian	23	7	10+5	2	1+1	1	6	4	0	0
17	FW	(Ukraine) UKR	Yevhen Seleznyov	3	2	1+2	2	0	0	0	0	0	0
18	FW	(Ukraine) UKR	Marko Dević	16	4	3+9	4	0+1	0	0+2	0	0+1	0

=== Goalscorers ===
Place	Position	Nation	Number	Name	Premier League	Ukrainian Cup	UEFA Champions League	Super Cup	Total
1	MF	(Armenia)	22	Henrikh Mkhitaryan	25	2	2	0	29
2	MF	(Brazil)	29	Alex Teixeira	10	4	2	0	16
3	FW	(Brazil)	9	Luiz Adriano	7	4	3	1	15
4	MF	(Brazil)	10	Willian	2	1	4	0	7
4	MF	(Brazil)	20	Douglas Costa	5	0	1	1	7
6	MF	(Brazil)	77	Ilsinho	6	0	0	0	6
6	MF	(Brazil)	7	Fernandinho	2	3	1	0	6
8	FW	(Ukraine)	18	Marko Dević	4	0	0	0	4
8	FW	(Croatia)	11	Eduardo	4	0	0	0	4
10	DF	(Ukraine)	5	Oleksandr Kucher	3	0	0	0	3
10	DF	(Croatia)	33	Darijo Srna	2	1	0	0	3
10	MF	(Brazil)	28	Taison	2	1	0	0	3
13	FW	(Ukraine)	17	Yevhen Seleznyov	2	0	0	0	2
14	FW	(Brazil)	31	Dentinho	1	0	0	0	1
14	DF	(Ukraine)	27	Dmytro Chyhrynskyi	1	0	0	0	1
14	DF	(Ukraine)	44	Yaroslav Rakitskiy	1	0	0	0	1
14	DF	(Ukraine)	38	Sergiy Kryvtsov	1	0	0	0	1
14	MF	(Brazil)	21	Alan Patrick	1	0	0	0	1
14	FW	(Brazil)	17	Maicon	1	0	0	0	1
14	DF	(Brazil)	31	Ismaily	1	0	0	0	1
14	MF	(Ukraine)	19	Oleksiy Gai	0	1	0	0	1
14				Own goal	1	0	0	0	1
				TOTALS	82	17	14	2	115

=== Clean sheets ===
Place	Position	Nation	Number	Name	Premier League	Ukrainian Cup	UEFA Champions League	Super Cup	Total
1	GK	(Ukraine)	30	Andriy Pyatov	11	0	1	1	13
2	GK	(Ukraine)	32	Anton Kanibolotskyi	5	1	0	0	6
				TOTALS	15	1	1	1	18

Kanibolotskiy & Pyatov both played in Shakhtar's 1-0 victory over Vorskla Poltava on 10 March 2013

=== Disciplinary record ===
Number	Nation	Position	Name	Premier League		Ukrainian Cup		Champions League		Supercup		Total	
Number	Nation	Position	Name	Yellow card	Red card	Yellow card	Red card	Yellow card	Red card	Yellow card	Red card	Yellow card	Red card
3	(Czech Republic)	MF	Tomáš Hübschman	0	0	1	0	2	0	0	0	3	0
5	(Ukraine)	DF	Oleksandr Kucher	3	1	0	0	3	0	1	0	3	0
6	(Ukraine)	MF	Taras Stepanenko	7	1	1	0	1	0	1	0	2	0
7	(Brazil)	MF	Fernandinho	8	1	1	0	1	0	0	0	2	0
9	(Brazil)	FW	Luiz Adriano	2	0	1	0	2	0	0	0	3	0
11	(Croatia)	FW	Eduardo	5	1	0	0	1	0	0	0	1	0
13	(Ukraine)	DF	Vyacheslav Shevchuk	1	0	1	0	0	0	0	0	1	0
14	(Ukraine)	MF	Vasyl Kobin	1	0	0	0	0	0	0	0	1	0
20	(Brazil)	MF	Douglas Costa	0	0	1	0	0	0	0	0	1	0
22	(Armenia)	MF	Henrikh Mkhitaryan	5	0	0	0	1	0	0	0	1	0
26	(Romania)	DF	Răzvan Raț	2	0	0	0	0	0	0	0	1	0
28	(Brazil)	MF	Taison	1	0	0	0	0	0	0	0	1	0
29	(Brazil)	MF	Alex Teixeira	2	1	1	0	1	0	0	0	2	0
33	(Croatia)	DF	Darijo Srna	7	0	2	0	1	0	0	0	3	0
38	(Ukraine)	DF	Sergiy Kryvtsov	3	0	0	0	0	0	0	0	1	0
44	(Ukraine)	DF	Yaroslav Rakytskiy	5	2	0	0	0	0	1	0	1	0
77	(Brazil)	MF	Ilsinho	1	0	0	0	1	0	0	0	1	0
Players away on loan:
31	(Brazil)	FW	Dentinho	1	0	0	0	0	0	0	0	1	0
Players who left Shakhtar Donetsk during the season:
10	(Brazil)	MF	Willian	3	0	0	0	0	0	0	0	1	0
17	(Ukraine)	FW	Yevhen Seleznyov	1	0	0	0	0	0	0	0	1	0
18	(Ukraine)	FW	Marko Dević	0	0	0	0	0	0	1	0	1	0
			TOTALS	58	7	9	0	14	0	4	0	85	7
