= Dmitry Vorobyov (disambiguation) =

Dmitry Vorobyov may refer to

- Dmitriy Vorobyov (born 1977), Russian and Ukrainian football goalkeeper
- Dmitry Vorobyov (born 1985), Russian ice hockey player
- Dmitry Vorobyov (footballer) (born 1997), Russian football forward
- Dmitry Lensky (pseudonym of Dmitry Timofeyevich Vorobyov) (1805–1860), Russian writer
