= Mamadi Sangare =

Guinean footballer (born 1982)

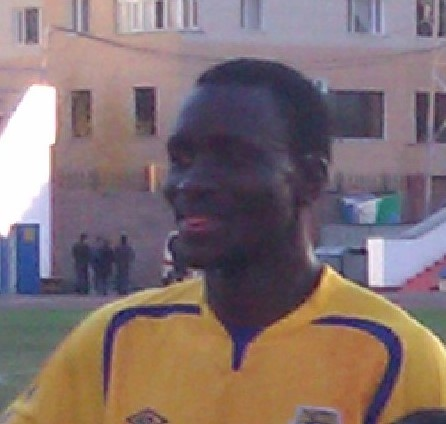

Personal information
- Full name: Mamadi Sangare
- Date of birth: 4 December 1982 (age 43)
- Place of birth: Conakry, Guinea
- Height: 1.86 m (6 ft 1 in)
- Position: Centre-back

Youth career
- –2001: Kaloum Star

Senior career*
Years	Team	Apps	(Gls)
2001–2006	CSKA Kyiv	113	(7)
2001	→ CSKA-2 Kyiv	11	(0)
2001	→ Systema-Boreks Borodianka (loan)	3	(1)
2006–2008	Nistru Otaci	46	(5)
2007–2009	Desna Chernihiv	31	(1)
2009–2010	Atyrau	4	(0)
2010	Tavriya Simferopol	0	(0)
2010	Lviv	12	(0)
2011	Okzhetpes	21	(0)
2012	Dynamo Khmelnytskyi	7	(1)
2012	Astana-1964	11	(2)
2013	Avanhard Kramatorsk	14	(1)

International career
- Guinea U17
- * Club domestic league appearances and goals

Mamadi Sangare (Ukrainian: Мамаді Сангаре; born 4 December 1982) is a Guinean former footballer who played as a defender. Sangaré last played for Avanhard Kramatorsk. He is better known for playing in CSKA Kyiv and being the first one outside the post Soviet territory to accept the Ukrainian citizenship.

== Career ==
Born in Conakry, Sangaré began in his homeland Guinea with AS Kaloum Star and signed 2001 with the Premier-Liha club FC Arsenal Kyiv at that time known as CSKA Kyiv (until December 2001). Sangare, however, at first was placed to play for the Army's second team playing in the Persha Liha. Upon the reorganization of CSKA in December 2001 he stayed with the Army club playing in the second division rather than the newly created city's club of Arsenal.

The first game in Ukraine he played on 9 April 2001 in Mykolaiv against the local team playing in the First League. The Armymen lost it 0:2. However, in his next participation a week later CSKA-2 (as it was known then) won, while playing away against the Dnipro's second team 1:0. In his first season Sangare played total of 11 games in the first league as well as one game for another club from Borodyanka Systema-Borex playing in the Druha Liha.

He played for five years (until the end of 2005) in FC CSKA Kyiv a total of 113 league games scoring 7 goals. In 2001–02 season Sangaré also played couple more games on loan with the Druha Liha club Systema-Borex scoring a winning goal against FC Dniester Ovidiopol. In those first five years he also participated in the Ukrainian Cup competitions earning five caps for CSKA Kyiv in August 2003 and 2004. Beside playing on the professional level Sangaré also participated in the Kyiv Oblast championship playing for FC Hran Buzova, for which he participated in the national amateur competitions as well.

Seeing that CSKA will not make to the Vyscha Liha, in the fall of 2006 he signed with Moldovan FC Nistru Otaci that played in the Divizia Naţională.

=== Desna Chernihiv ===
After playing 46 games and scoring another 5 goals Sangaré, nevertheless, returned to Ukraine signing in January 2008 with another club of Persha liha FC Desna Chernihiv. There he played 31 games (1 goal) and two games in the Ukrainian Cup.

=== Atyrau ===
At the start of 2009 Sangaré moved to play for FC Atyrau in Kazakhstan. At the start of 2010 he finally managed to sign with the 2010 Ukrainian Cup winners Tavriya Simferopol for which he, however, played only in the championship for reserves. In summer of 2010 the Ukrainian defender signed again with the Persha Liha club FC Lviv.

== Honours ==
- FC Atyrau
  - Kazakhstan Cup: 2009
- SC Tavriya Simferopol
  - Ukrainian Cup: 2009–10

== Personal ==
Sangare who was born in Conakry, Guinea holds the Ukrainian passport, he was naturalized in 2005.
