= Júnior Moraes =

Ukrainian footballer

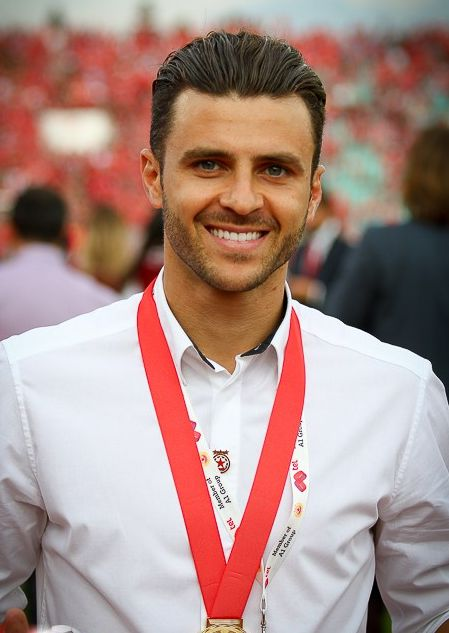
- Moraes in 2018

Personal information
- Full name: Aluísio Chaves Ribeiro; Moraes Júnior
- Date of birth: 4 April 1987 (age 39)
- Place of birth: Santos, Brazil
- Height: 1.76 m (5 ft 9 in)
- Position: Striker

Youth career
- Santos

Senior career*
Years	Team	Apps	(Gls)
2007–2009	Santos	24	(4)
2008	→ Ponte Preta (loan)	7	(0)
2009	Santo André	8	(2)
2010–2011	Gloria Bistrița	32	(18)
2011–2015	Metalurh Donetsk	63	(35)
2011–2012	→ CSKA Sofia (loan)	26	(17)
2015–2018	Dynamo Kyiv	54	(22)
2017	→ Tianjin Quanjian (loan)	3	(0)
2018–2022	Shakhtar Donetsk	72	(46)
2022–2023	Corinthians	14	(1)
Total		293	(143)

International career^{‡}
2019–2021	Ukraine	11	(1)
- * Club domestic league appearances and goals ‡ National team caps and goals as of 16 June 2023

Aluísio Chaves Ribeiro Moraes Júnior (Ukrainian: Алуі́зіо Ча́вес Рібе́йро Мора́ес Жу́ніор; born 4 April 1987), commonly known as Júnior Moraes or just Moraes, is a retired footballer who played as a forward. Born in Brazil, he has previously played for the Ukraine national team.

== Biography ==
Moraes was born in a family of sportsmen. His father was a very good football player. He played for Flamengo and Santos. He has a brother Bruno who also started his football career at Santos, while his sister ended her football career because of an injury. His mother was a Paulista tennis champion.

He started to play football in São Paulo when he was 4 years old, being in the same group with Robinho. To Europe Júnior Moraes arrived when his brother Bruno was playing for ACF Gloria Bistrița in 2010. After playing few years in Balkans (Romania, Bulgaria), in 2012 Júnior Moraes moved to Ukraine where he played for several top-level teams in Kyiv and Donetsk. Due to the 2022 Russian full-scale invasion, he moved back to Brazil.

== Career ==
=== Start and Brazilian period ===
Moraes was promoted to the senior team of Santos by coach Vanderlei Luxemburgo at the age of 18.

He then scored a goal in the 2007 Campeonato Paulista final between Santos and São Caetano, helping his side to the title.

=== Debut in Europe and Gloria Bistrița ===
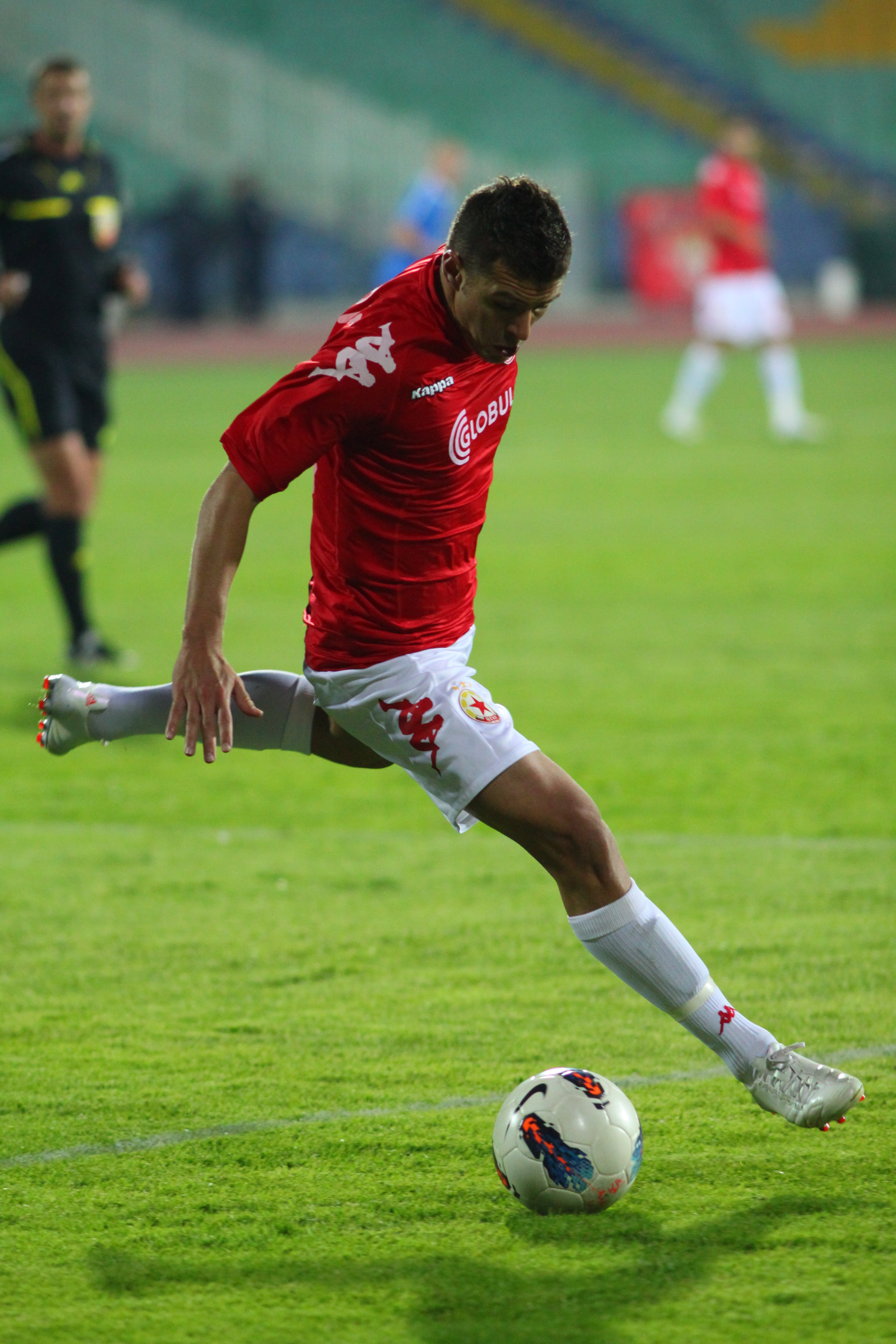
Moraes playing for CSKA Sofia in 2011.

Moraes made an impressive debut in Liga I for Gloria Bistrița, scoring 10 goals in 17 appearances. However, the club itself struggled placing only 11. His good run continued in the first part of the 2010–11 Liga I season as he accumulated 8 goals for 2010-11 season and a total of 18 goals for Gloria Bistrița in both seasons of the Romanian football championship. Placing only 14 among 18 clubs, Gloria Bistrița were denied a licence for the next 2011–12 season because of accumulated debt and were therefore relegated to Liga II.

=== CSKA Sofia and Metalurh Donetsk ===
Facing financial crisis on 12 February 2011, Gloria Bistrița announced that Moraes was sold to Ukrainian Premier League squad Metalurh Donetsk, for a reported fee of €1.25 million. However, Moraes never played a game for Metalurh before he rejoined the team in the summer of 2012.

Before 2011–12 season Moraes joined Bulgarian side CSKA Sofia. He made his A Group debut on 12 September 2011 in a 3–0 home win over Lokomotiv Plovdiv, scoring a penalty. On 2 October, Moraes scored twice in a 3–0 away win over Svetkavitsa. He scored a hattrick versus Litex Lovech on 19 May. Moraes eventually finished the 2011–12 A Group season as joint top scorer with Ivan Stoyanov. However, CSKA Sofia was outperformed surprisingly by a point by Ludogorets that won the national title for the first time and CSKA qualified to the UEFA Europe League instead of the Champions League.

In his first season in Ukraine for Metalurh during the 2012–13 season Junior Moraes placed 4th in topscorer list with 11 tallies sharing the place with Andriy Yarmolenko. He missed the first game of season for Metalurh against Dynamo Kyiv and made his debut in the Ukrainian Premier League on 22 July 2012 at the home game of Round 2 against Zorya Luhansk, which Metalurh lost 1–2 playing at their home stadium Metalurh in Donetsk. Junior Moraes was substituted out by the Brazilian-born Belgian Danilo on the 70th minute. That season Metalurh eventually qualified to the UEFA Europe League and Moraes finally made his debut at the European club competition at the away game against Albanian side of FK Kukësi. Playing the first game in Tirana on August 1, 2013, Metalurh lost it 0–2 and Moraes was substituted by Maksym Dehtyaryov on 70th minute. A week thereafter, Kukësi that was making their debut at the European club competitions managed to hold off Metalurh in Donetsk in an away loss 0–1, while Junior Moraes played the full match.

The next season (2013–14) was the best for Moraes in Metalurh. He scored 19 goals in the Ukrainian Premier League yielding the topscorer award to Luiz Adriano by a single goal. With the start of the Russo-Ukraine War in 2014, Metalurh Donetsk faced some financial hardship and struggled in performance placing only 6th. Nonetheless, the club managed to reach status of a candidate for the UEFA continental competitions. In April of 2014, their status was denied and passed on to next club.

With the war developing, Metalurh was forced to relocate to Kyiv from Donetsk for the 2014–15 Ukrainian Premier League season playing at the Obolon Arena. In addition, at the beginning of the season on 9 September 2014 Metalurh Donetsk were deducted a total of 6 points on decision of the FIFA Disciplinary Committee. With return of Volodymyr Pyatenko to Metalurh Donetsk, Junior Moraes appearances decreased and he scored only 5 goals in the league competitions.

=== Dynamo Kyiv ===
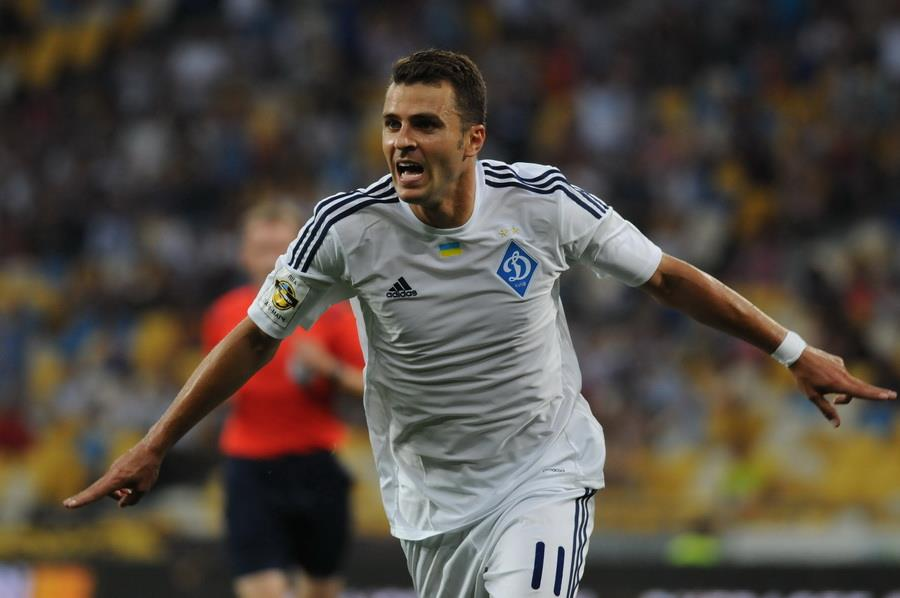
Júnior Moraes with Dynamo Kyiv in 2015.

With the ongoing 2014–15 Ukrainian Premier League season, on 22 May 2015, Moraes signed a three-year contract with Dynamo Kyiv, who at the time have won the Ukrainian League which had automatically qualified them to the UEFA Champions League group stage. Since his contract with Metalurh was expiring in the summer of 2015, he joined Dynamo as a free agent. He made his official debut for Dynamo in the Ukrainian Super Cup against Shakhtar Donetsk, which Dynamo lost 0–2, conceding both goals in the injury time of the second half while being down to 10 men. Despite the loss, Moraes was one of the best players on the pitch as he got many opportunities, one of which hit the crossbar. On 25 July 2015, Moraes scored his first official goal for Dynamo on the 61st minute in a 2–0 win against Olimpik Donetsk in the Ukrainian Premier League and was one of the best players on the pitch despite the fact that his team was down to 9 men in the second half.

On 16 September 2015, Moraes made his UEFA Champions League debut in a 2–2 draw against Portuguese club FC Porto in the group stage. On 29 September 2015, Moraes scored his first ever UEFA Champions League goal in the second group stage match, scoring the second goal on the 50th minute in a 0–2 away win against Israeli club Maccabi Tel Aviv. In that season he helped Dynamo reach the 1/8 of the UEFA Champions League for the first time in 16 years, getting knocked out by Manchester City 1–3 on aggregate, as well as winning the Ukrainian Premier League.

=== Shakhtar Donetsk ===
On 18 June 2018, Moraes signed a two-year contract with Shakhtar Donetsk after his contract with his previous club and Shakhtar's UPL rival Dynamo Kyiv ran out.

On 8 December 2021, Moraes extended his contract with Shakhtar Donetsk until 30 June 2022.

=== Corinthians ===
On 16 March 2022, Moraes joined Corinthians on a permanent deal until December 2023.

== International career ==
Moraes indicated that he would be likely to accept a call-up for Ukraine national team if asked. On 5 March 2019, Ukrainian journalist announced that Moraes has already filed for citizenship and awaits approval.

Right before the UEFA Euro 2020 qualifying, it was announced that he received Ukrainian citizenship 13 days later by a decree of President Petro Poroshenko and made his debut as a substituted player in the drawn match against Portugal national team on 22 March 2019. He became the third Brazilian to have been capped for Ukraine after Edmar and Marlos, who made their debut in 2011 and 2017, respectively.

Soon after receiving his naturalization, Júnior Moraes became in the middle of international scandal connected with the UEFA Euro 2020 qualifying. Following the bleak performance of the Portugal national team in the opening match against Ukraine and loss of the Luxembourg national team from Ukraine in the following round of the tournament, one of the Portuguese media (Mais futebol) came out with an article questioning legality of the Moraes's naturalization. In his article the "Mais futebol" deputy director Sérgio Pereira argued that not only Júnior Moraes does not have any kinship to Ukraine, but he did not even live in Ukraine for the required period of time.

== Career statistics ==
=== Club ===
Appearances and goals by club, season and competition
Club	Season	League			State League		Cup (Note: Includes Copa do Brasil, Cupa României, Bulgarian Cup, Ukrainian Cup, Chinese FA Cup)		Continental		Other		Total	
Club	Season	Division	Apps	Goals	Apps	Goals	Apps	Goals	Apps	Goals	Apps	Goals	Apps	Goals
Santos	2007	Série A	15	1	4 (Note: Appearance(s) in Campeonato Paulista)	2	—		2 (Note: Appearance(s) in Copa Libertadores)	0	—		21	3
Santos	2008	Série A	1	1	4	0	—		0	0	—		5	1
Santos	Total		16	2	8	2	—		2	0	—		26	4
Ponte Preta (loan)	2008	Série B	7	0	—		—		—		—		7	0
Santo André	2009	Série A	3	1	5	1	0	0	—		—		8	2
Gloria Bistrița	2009–10	Liga I	17	10	—		0	0	—		—		17	10
Gloria Bistrița	2010–11	Liga I	15	8	—		3	2	—		—		18	10
Gloria Bistrița	Total		32	18	—		3	2	—		—		35	20
CSKA Sofia	2011–12	A Group	24	16	—		2	1	0	0	0	0	26	17
Metalurh Donetsk	2012–13	Ukrainian Premier League	23	11	—		0	0	4 (Note: Appearance(s) in UEFA Europa League)	2	—		27	13
Metalurh Donetsk	2013–14	Ukrainian Premier League	27	19	—		1	0	2	0	—		30	19
Metalurh Donetsk	2014–15	Ukrainian Premier League	13	5	—		0	0	—		—		13	5
Metalurh Donetsk	Total		63	35	—		1	0	6	2	—		70	37
Dynamo Kyiv	2015–16	Ukrainian Premier League	20	7	—		3	1	7 (Note: Appearance(s) in UEFA Champions League)	1	1 (Note: Appearance(s) in Ukrainian Super Cup)	0	31	9
Dynamo Kyiv	2016–17	Ukrainian Premier League	16	10	—		1	2	6	1	1	0	24	13
Dynamo Kyiv	2017–18	Ukrainian Premier League	18	5	—		1	0	11	7	0	0	30	12
Dynamo Kyiv	Total		54	22	—		5	3	24	9	2	0	85	34
Tianjin Quanjian (loan)	2017	Chinese Super League	3	0	—		1	2	—		—		4	2
Shakhtar Donetsk	2018–19	Ukrainian Premier League	27	19	—		3	3	8 (Note: Six appearances and three goals in UEFA Champions League, two appearances and one goal in UEFA Europa League)	4	1	0	39	26
Shakhtar Donetsk	2019–20	Ukrainian Premier League	27	19	—		1	0	12 (Note: Six appearances and two goals in UEFA Champions League, six appearances and four goals in UEFA Europa League)	6	1	0	41	25
Shakhtar Donetsk	2020–21	Ukrainian Premier League	17	6	—		0	0	7 (Note: Three appearances in UEFA Champions League, four appearances and two goals in UEFA Europa League)	2	1	1	25	9
Shakhtar Donetsk	2021–22	Ukrainian Premier League	1	1	—		0	0	0	0	0	0	1	1
Shakhtar Donetsk	Total		72	45	—		4	3	27	12	3	1	106	61
Corinthians	2022	Série A	9	0	2	0	2	1	4	0	—		17	1
Corinthians	2023	Série A	0	0	3	0	0	0	0	0	—		3	0
Corinthians	Total		9	0	5	0	2	1	4	0	—		20	1
Career total			279	140	18	3	18	12	63	23	5	1	386	179

=== International ===
As of match played 31 March 2021

Ukraine
Year	Apps	Goals
2019	5	0
2020	3	0
2021	3	1
Total	11	1

==== International goals ====
Scores and results list Ukraine's goal tally first. Score column indicates score after each Moraes goal.

No.	Date	Venue	Opponent	Score	Result	Competition
1.	28 March 2021	Olimpiyskiy National Sports Complex, Kyiv, Ukraine	Finland	1–0	1–1	2022 FIFA World Cup qualification

== Honours ==
=== Club ===
Santos

- Campeonato Paulista: 2007

CSKA Sofia

- Bulgarian Supercup: 2011

Dynamo Kyiv

- Ukrainian Premier League: 2015–16
- Ukrainian Super Cup: 2016

Shakhtar Donetsk

- Ukrainian Premier League: 2018–19, 2019–20
- Ukrainian Cup: 2018–19

=== Individual ===
- A PFG Player of the Year: 2011–12
- A PFG Top Scorer: 2011-12 (16 goals)
- Ukrainian Premier League Top Scorer: 2018–19 (19 goals), 2019–20 (20 goals),
- Ukrainian Premier League Best goalscorer: 2019-20
