= Kostyantyn Odolskyi =

Ukrainian footballer

Personal information
- Full name: Kostyantyn Volodymyrovych Odolskyi
- Date of birth: 5 January 1989 (age 37)
- Place of birth: Balta, Ukrainian SSR
- Height: 1.84 m (6 ft 0 in)
- Position: Goalkeeper

Youth career
- 2002–2006: RVUFK Kyiv

Senior career*
| Years | Team | Apps | (Gls) |
| 2006–2012 | Metalurh Donetsk | 0 | (0) |
| 2011 | → Banants (loan) | 1 | (0) |
| 2013–2015 | Bukovyna Chernivtsi | 17 | (0) |
| 2015 | Dinaz Vyshhorod | | |
| 2016 | Krystal Kherson | 8 | (0) |
| 2017–2019 | Ahrobiznes Volochysk | 39 | (0) |
| 2019 | Sluch Starokostiantyniv | | |
| 2021–2023 | Iskra Teofipol | | |

International career
| 2006 | Ukraine-17 | 1 | (0) |
| 2007 | Ukraine-18 | 8 | (0) |
| 2007 | Ukraine-19 | 2 | (0) |
- * Club domestic league appearances and goals

Kostyantyn Odolskyi (Ukrainian: Костянтин Володимирович Одольський; born 5 January 1989) is a professional Ukrainian football goalkeeper. He is the product of the RVUFk Kyiv school system.
