= Pavlo Hryshchenko =

Ukrainian footballer

Personal information
- Full name: Pavlo Oleksandrovych Hryshchenko
- Date of birth: 6 July 1990 (age 36)
- Place of birth: Staromykhailivka, Ukrainian SSR
- Height: 1.75 m (5 ft 9 in)
- Position: Midfielder

Youth career
- 2003–2005: Olimpik Donetsk
- 2005–2006: Metalurh Donetsk

Senior career*
Years	Team	Apps	(Gls)
2006–2013	Metalurh Donetsk	6	(0)
2009	→ Stal Dniprodzerzhynsk (loan)	10	(0)
2013	Banants	?	(?)
2013	Bukovyna Chernivtsi	7	(1)
2014–2015	Daugava Rīga	0	(0)
2016–2019	Okean Kerch		
2019–2020	TSK-Tavriya Simferopol		
2020	Okean Kerch		

International career^{‡}
2007–2008	Ukraine-18	9	(1)
- * Club domestic league appearances and goals as of 1 July 2014 ‡ National team caps and goals as of 10 July 2014

Pavlo Hryshchenko (Ukrainian: Павло Олександрович Грищенко; born 6 July 1990) is a professional Ukrainian football midfielder.

== Club career ==
He is the product of the Metalurh Donetsk Youth school system.

In 2015 he was spotted to play for a team of Donetsk People's Republic.
