= China (footballer, born 1982) =

Portuguese footballer

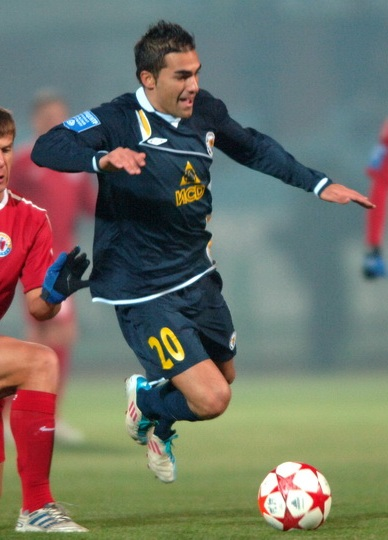
- China on the ball for Metalurh Donetsk (2011)

Personal information
- Full name: João Pedro dos Santos Gonçalves
- Date of birth: 15 April 1982 (age 44)
- Place of birth: Beja, Portugal
- Height: 1.72 m (5 ft 8 in)
- Position: Left back

Youth career
- 1991–1992: Boavista Pinheiros
- 1992–2000: Sporting CP
- 2000–2001: Farense

Senior career*
Years	Team	Apps	(Gls)
2001–2002	Desportivo Beja		
2002–2003	Sporting Pombal	30	(0)
2003–2004	Fátima	29	(1)
2004–2005	Maia	31	(0)
2005–2008	Naval	85	(0)
2008–2009	Belenenses	10	(0)
2009–2013	Metalurh Donetsk	53	(2)
2013–2015	Ermis	57	(2)
2015–2017	Nea Salamina	58	(0)
2017–2018	Ermis	31	(1)
2018–2020	Vilafranquense	49	(3)
2020–2021	Marinhense	16	(0)
- * Club domestic league appearances and goals as of 18:16, 11 November 2021 (UTC)

João Pedro dos Santos Gonçalves (born 15 April 1982 in Beja), known as China, is a Portuguese former professional footballer who played as a left back.

== Club statistics ==
As of match played 18 November 2015

Club	Season	League			National cup (Note: Includes Taça de Portugal, Ukrainian Cup, Cypriot Cup)		Continental		Total	
Club	Season	Division	Apps	Goals	Apps	Goals	Apps	Goals	Apps	Goals
Fátima	2003–04	Segunda Divisão	29	1	2	0	—		31	1
Maia	2004–05	Segunda Liga	31	0	3	0	—		34	0
Naval	2005–06	Primeira Liga	30	0	1	0	—		31	0
Naval	2006–07	Primeira Liga	27	0	3	0	—		30	0
Naval	2007–08	Primeira Liga	28	0	5	0	—		33	0
Naval	Total		85	0	9	0	—		94	0
Belenenses	2008–09	Primeira Liga	10	0	7	0	—		17	0
Metalurh Donetsk	2008–09	Ukrainian Premier League	10	0			—		10	0
Metalurh Donetsk	2009–10	Ukrainian Premier League	10	1	3	0	3 (Note: Appearances in UEFA Europa League)	0	16	1
Metalurh Donetsk	2010–11	Ukrainian Premier League	21	1	1	0	—		22	1
Metalurh Donetsk	2011–12	Ukrainian Premier League	13	0	4	0	—		17	0
Metalurh Donetsk	2012–13	Ukrainian Premier League	0	0	0	0	—		0	0
Metalurh Donetsk	Total		54	2	8	0	3	0	65	2
Ermis	2013–14	Cypriot First Division	33	0	6	0	—		39	0
Ermis	2014–15	Cypriot First Division	23	2	5	0	2	0	30	2
Ermis	2015–16	Cypriot First Division	1	0	0	0	—		1	0
Ermis	Total		57	2	11	0	2	0	70	2
Nea Salamina	2015–16	Cypriot First Division	8	0	0	0	—		8	0
Career total			274	5	40	0	5	0	319	5
