= Illya Haliuza =

Ukrainian footballer

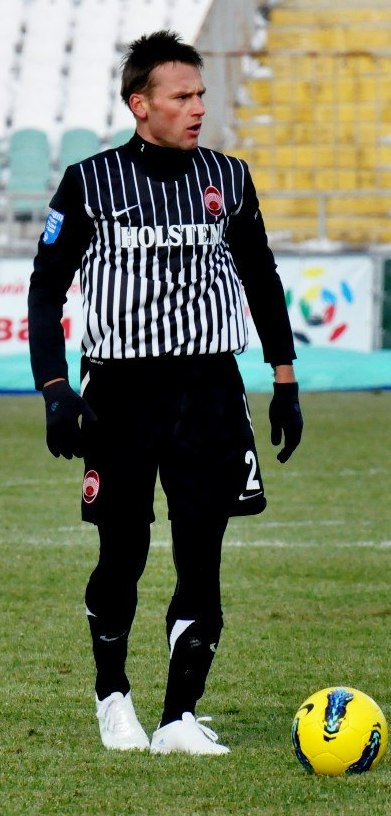

Personal information
- Full name: Illya Serhiyovych Haliuza
- Date of birth: 16 November 1979 (age 46)
- Place of birth: Arkhangelsk, Soviet Union
- Height: 1.76 m (5 ft 9 1/2 in)
- Position: Midfielder

Youth career
- 1995–1998: Zorya Luhansk

Senior career*
Years	Team	Apps	(Gls)
1996–2000	Zorya Luhansk	65	(10)
2001–2002	Chornomorets Odesa	58	(2)
2001–2002	→ Chornomorets-2 Odesa	6	(3)
2003	Dnepr Mogilev	26	(4)
2004	Oryol	1	(0)
2004–2005	Dnepr Mogilev	39	(9)
2006	Šiauliai	33	(16)
2007–2011	Tavriya Simferopol	68	(4)
2012–2013	Zorya Luhansk	36	(9)
2014	Shakhtyor Soligorsk	29	(4)
2015	Belshina Bobruisk	24	(5)
2016	Dnepr Mogilev	21	(1)
- * Club domestic league appearances and goals

Illya Serhiyovych Haliuza (Ukrainian: Ілля Сергійович Галюза; born 16 November 1979) is a Ukrainian retired football midfielder.
