= Oleksandr Bandura =

Ukrainian footballer (born 1986)

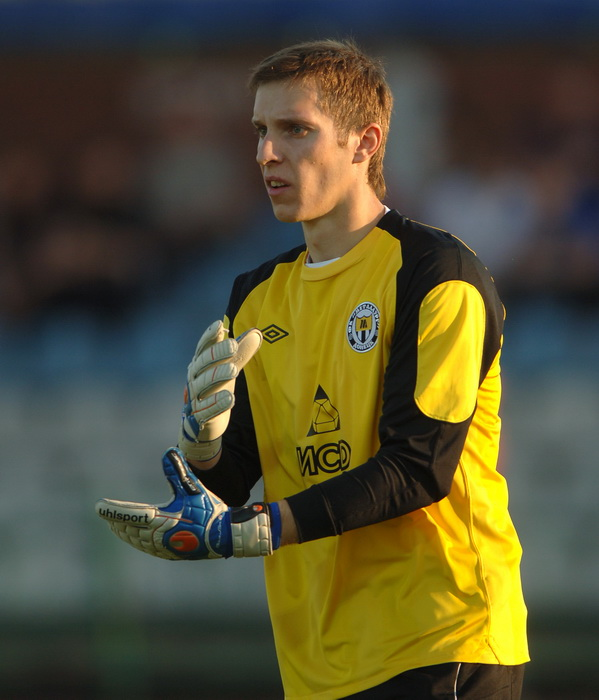

Personal information
- Full name: Oleksandr Viktorovych Bandura
- Date of birth: 30 May 1986 (age 40)
- Place of birth: Hamaliivka, Konotop Raion, Sumy Oblast, Soviet Union (now Ukraine)
- Height: 1.86 m (6 ft 1 in)
- Position: Goalkeeper

Youth career
- 2000–2003: Zmina Sumy
- 2003: SERZh Sumy

Senior career*
Years	Team	Apps	(Gls)
2004–2006	Spartak Sumy	9	(0)
2006	Yavir Krasnopillya	11	(0)
2006–2007	Spartak Sumy	5	(0)
2007–2008	Yavir Krasnopillya	30	(0)
2008–2009	Tavriya Simferopol	5	(0)
2009	→ Krymteplytsia Molodizhne (loan)	8	(0)
2010–2011	Krymteplytsia Molodizhne	37	(0)
2011–2015	Metalurh Donetsk	89	(0)
2015–2017	Stal Kamianske	9	(0)
2017–2018	Veres Rivne	30	(0)
2018–2019	Lviv	30	(0)
2020–2022	Rukh Lviv	28	(0)
2022–2024	Mynai	46	(0)
2024	Dinaz Vyshhorod	11	(0)
- * Club domestic league appearances and goals as of 8 January 2025

Oleksandr Viktorovych Bandura (Ukrainian: Олександр Вікторович Бандура; 30 May 1986) is a Ukrainian professional footballer who plays as a goalkeeper for Dinaz Vyshhorod.

== Career ==
He previously played for Tavriya Simferopol in the Ukrainian Premier League, joining in February 2008. He also played for FC Metalurh Donetsk. In 2025 his contract with the club was ended.
