= Vitaliy Ivanko =

Ukrainian footballer

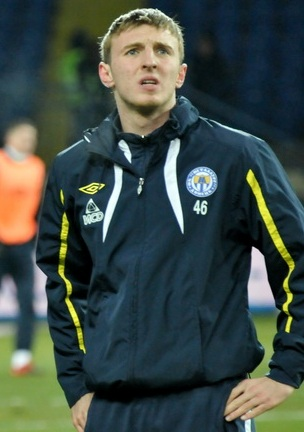
- Ivanko with Metalurh Donetsk in 2010

Personal information
- Full name: Vitaliy Mykolayovych Ivanko
- Date of birth: 9 April 1992 (age 34)
- Place of birth: Kharkiv, Ukraine
- Height: 1.78 m (5 ft 10 in)
- Position: Forward

Youth career
- 2005–2007: UFK Kharkiv
- 2008: Metalurh Donetsk

Senior career*
| Years | Team | Apps | (Gls) |
| 2008–2013 | Metalurh Donetsk | 48 | (2) |
| 2013–2014 | AEK Larnaca | 19 | (1) |
| 2015 | Belshina Bobruisk | 9 | (0) |
| 2015–2016 | Helios Kharkiv | 18 | (4) |
| 2016 | Kolkheti-1913 Poti | 6 | (0) |
| 2017 | Panegialios | 9 | (1) |
| 2017 | Sutjeska | 1 | (0) |
| 2018 | Tavriya Simferopol | 1 | (0) |

International career^{‡}
| 2007–2008 | Ukraine U16 | 12 | (3) |
| 2008–2009 | Ukraine U17 | 13 | (1) |
| 2009–2010 | Ukraine U18 | 11 | (0) |
| 2010 | Ukraine U19 | 1 | (0) |
| 2012–2013 | Ukraine U21 | 10 | (4) |
- * Club domestic league appearances and goals as of 31 December 2018 ‡ National team caps and goals as of 3 January 2017

Vitaliy Ivanko (Ukrainian: Віталій Миколайович Іванко; born 9 April 1992) is a Ukrainian former professional footballer who played as a forward.

== Club career ==
He is the product of the Metalurh Donetsk Youth school system. He played for FC Helios Kharkiv in the Ukrainian First League.
