= Vasyl Pryima =

Ukrainian footballer

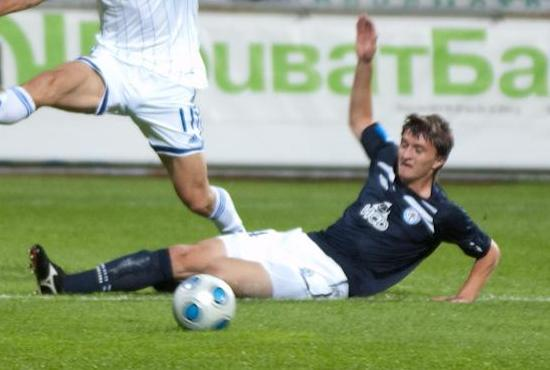

Personal information
- Full name: Vasyl Myronovych Pryima
- Date of birth: 10 June 1991 (age 35)
- Place of birth: Lis, Yavoriv Raion, Lviv Oblast, Ukrainian SSR
- Height: 1.85 m (6 ft 1 in)
- Position: Centre back

Youth career
- 2002–2006: Dyussh-15
- 2006: Arsenal Kyiv
- 2007: KSDYSOR Kyiv

Senior career*
Years	Team	Apps	(Gls)
2008–2015	Metalurh Donetsk	123	(4)
2015–2016	Torino	0	(0)
2016	→ Frosinone (loan)	5	(0)
2016–2017	Frosinone	18	(1)
2017–2018	Zorya Luhansk	17	(1)
2019	Shakhtyor Soligorsk	6	(0)
2020	Karpaty Lviv	2	(0)
2020	Chornomorets Odesa	6	(0)

International career
2006–2007	Ukraine U16	7	(1)
2006–2008	Ukraine U17	10	(0)
2008–2009	Ukraine U18	5	(0)
2009–2010	Ukraine U19	11	(1)
2010	Ukraine U20	1	(0)
2010–2012	Ukraine U21	9	(0)
- * Club domestic league appearances and goals as of 5 February 2021

Vasyl Pryima (Ukrainian: Василь Миронович Прийма; born 10 June 1991) is a Ukrainian former professional footballer who played as a central defender.

== Club career ==
=== Early career ===
He is the product of the Metalurh Donetsk Youth school system. After Metalurh Donetsk went bankrupt in July 2015 he was let go.

=== Torino ===
On 18 October 2015, he signed with Torino until June 2016 with an option to extend his contract for an additional two years.

He was called up for the first time on 31 October 2015, during the Turin derby, remaining on the bench for the full 90 minutes. In December he made his debut with the Granata in a Coppa Italia fixture won 4–1 against Cesena.

=== Frosinone ===
In February 2016, he moved on loan to Frosinone, and called up for the first time in a match won 1–0 against Bologna, remaining on the bench. He made his debut in Serie A as a starter in the 29th round, in a relegation tie against Carpi.

On 28 June 2016, Frosinone announced that they had signed Pryima on a free transfer following the non-renewal of his contract with Torino

== International career ==
He was called up to the Ukraine national under-21 football team in November 2009.
