= Constantinos Makrides =

Cypriot footballer

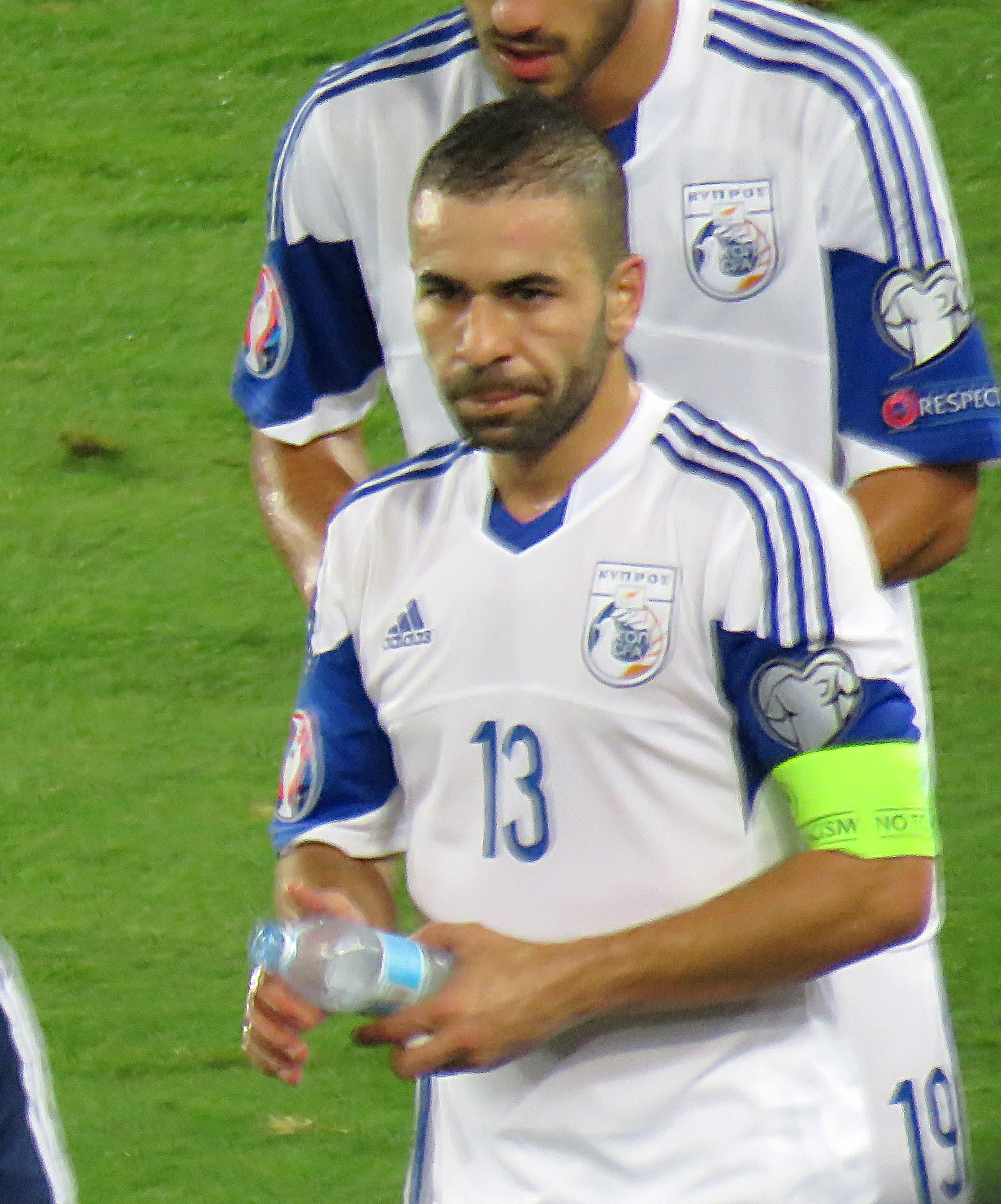

Personal information
- Full name: Constantinos Makrides
- Date of birth: 13 January 1982 (age 44)
- Place of birth: Limassol, Cyprus
- Height: 1.69 m (5 ft 6 1/2 in)
- Positions: Central midfielder; attacking midfielder

Team information
- Current team: Enosis Neon Paralimni (manager)

Youth career
- Apollon Limassol

Senior career*
Years	Team	Apps	(Gls)
2001–2004	Apollon Limassol	36	(2)
2002	→Ethnikos Assia (loan)	22	(4)
2004–2008	APOEL	107	(29)
2008–2009	Metalurh Donetsk	29	(3)
2009–2012	Omonia	84	(9)
2012–2015	Metalurh Donetsk	67	(3)
2015–2016	APOEL	14	(0)
2016–2018	Apollon Limassol	12	(0)
Total		371	(50)

International career
2004–2018	Cyprus	77	(5)

Managerial career
- 2022: Apollon Limassol (caretaker)
- 2022–2023: Apollon Limassol
- 2023–2026: Cyprus U21
- 2026–: Enosis Neon Paralimni
- * Club domestic league appearances and goals

Constantinos Makrides (Greek: Κωνσταντίνος Μακρίδης; born 13 January 1982) is a Cypriot retired footballer and manager who played as a central midfielder.

== Club career ==
=== Apollon ===
Makrides started playing football at Apollon Academies and because of his talent was soon training with the first team. Despite this talent, the Limassol team decided to give him more time to mature his game, so he was transferred as a loan to Ethnikos Assia in 2001. The next season, he returned to Apollon and under the coaching of Dusan Mitošević became a starting line-up regular for the team, with 25 appearances. A star was rising but the 2002-03 was not a season for Makrides to remember since Ilie Dumitrescu did not use him. Having problems with the board and the coach, Makrides demanded to leave the team. His manager proposed him to Omonia but the Nicosia team refused. At the very last minute of the January transfer window he was signed to APOEL.

=== APOEL ===
Makrides move to APOEL was a successful one, and established himself as one of the best in the Cyprus League and also became a regular to the national team. He played mainly as a right winger for APOEL and won two championships, two cups and one super cup. He had also many European competitions appearances. Probably the best goal in his career so far is the goal against Maccabi Tel Aviv in the UEFA Cup where he started from his own half, passed the entire Maccabi defence and slid a shot past the goalkeeper.

=== Metalurh Donetsk ===
Makrides decided after the victory win over Anorthosis in the cup final 2008, to make a big step outside Cyprus and sign for Ukrainian outfit FC Metalurh Donetsk, a club that his friend and ex APOEL teammate Ricardo Fernandes played for. He was considered one of the key figures of the team, that finished 4th place in the Ukrainian Premier League 2008–09, winning a spot to the UEFA Europa League second qualifying round.

=== Omonia ===
Makrides decided after one year in Ukrainian Premier League 2008–09, to return to Cyprus. He signed for Omonia a 4-years contract in August 2009. He took the shirt with number 13. He established himself as one of the best players of Omonoia and he help the team to return to the titles after seven years without a title. In the 2011-2012 he is named as captain of the team.

=== Metalurh Donetsk ===
On 23 June 2012, Makrides returned to FC Metalurh Donetsk. He left the team two years later, due to the club's economic uncertainty.

=== APOEL ===
On 18 June 2015, Makrides returned to APOEL after seven years, signing a two-year contract with the club. After appearing in 24 matches in all competitions (including three appearances in the group stage of the UEFA Europa League for the first time in his career) and after only seven months in the club, his contract was mutually terminated on 8 January 2016.

== International career ==
Constantinos Makrides is also a regular player for the Cyprus national football team and the current captain of the team. He played the full 90 minutes in all 4 games of Cyprus' Euro 2008 qualification campaign to date, including a 5–2 victory over Ireland and a 1–1 draw with Germany.

=== International goals ===
Scores and results list Cyprus' goal tally first.

No	Date	Venue	Opponent	Score	Result	Competition
1.	12 September 2007	GSP Stadium, Nicosia, Cyprus	San Marino	1–0	3–0	UEFA Euro 2008 qualification
2.	20 August 2008	Stade de Genève, Geneva, Switzerland	Switzerland	1–2	1–4	Friendly
3.	11 September 2012	Antonis Papadopoulos Stadium, Larnaca, Cyprus	Iceland	1–0	1–0	2014 FIFA World Cup qualification
4.	6 February 2013	GSP Stadium, Nicosia, Cyprus	Serbia	1–0	1–3	Friendly
5.	10 October 2014	GSP Stadium, Nicosia, Cyprus	Israel	2–1	2–1	UEFA Euro 2016 qualification

== Managerial statistics ==
As of 9 February 2023

Managerial record by team and tenure
Team	Nat	From	To	Record								Ref
Team	Nat	From	To	G	W	D	L	GF	GA	GD	Win %	Ref
Apollon Limassol (caretaker)	(Cyprus)	10 August 2022	13 August 2022	1	1	0	0	2	0	+2	100.00	
Apollon Limassol	(Cyprus)	9 November 2022	10 February 2023	13	6	2	5	18	16	+2	46.15	
Total				14	7	2	5	20	16	+4	50.00	—

== Honours ==
APOEL

- Cypriot League: 2003–04, 2006–07
- Cypriot Cup:2005–06, 2007–08
- Cypriot Super Cup: 2004

Omonia

- Cypriot League: 2009–10
- Cypriot Cup: 2010–11, 2011–12
- Cypriot Super Cup: 2010

Apollon Limassol

- Cypriot Cup: 2016–17
