= Denys Holaydo =

Ukrainian footballer

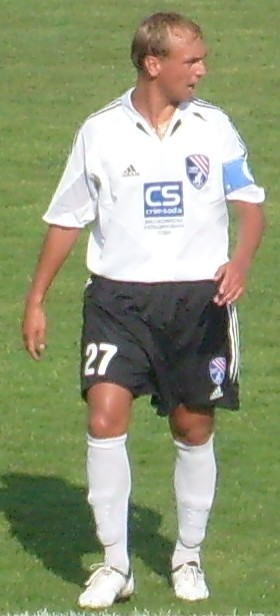

Personal information
- Full name: Denys Oleksandrovych Holaydo
- Date of birth: 3 June 1984 (age 42)
- Place of birth: Simferopol, Ukrainian SSR, Soviet Union
- Height: 1.69 m (5 ft 6 1/2 in)
- Positions: Defender; midfielder

Youth career
- 1998–2001: UOR Simferopol
- 2002–2003: Tavriya Simferopol

Senior career*
Years	Team	Apps	(Gls)
2003–2010	Tavriya Simferopol	140	(5)
2005–2006	→ Zakarpattya Uzhhorod (loan)	36	(1)
2011–2013	Metalurh Donetsk	61	(2)
2014	Slutsk	10	(0)
2014–2015	Metalurh Donetsk	1	(0)
2015–2017	TSK Simferopol	31	(1)

International career
2003–2004	Ukraine-21	6	(1)
2006	Crimean Tatars		
2008	Ukraine	4	(0)
- * Club domestic league appearances and goals

Denys Holaydo (Ukrainian: Денис Олександрович Голайдо); Denis Golaydo (Russian: Денис Александрович Голайдо; born 3 June 1984) is a retired Ukrainian-born Russian football midfielder.

== Career ==
He debuted for the Ukraine national football team on Wednesday 26 March 2008, where he gave an assist to Ukrainian legend Andriy Shevchenko, helping Ukraine in the 2–0 win against Serbia. After the annexation of Crimea to the Russian Federation Golaydo also received a Russian passport.
