= Dmitriy Vorobyov =

Ukrainian footballer and official

Personal information
- Full name: Dmitriy Aleksandrovich Vorobyov
- Date of birth: 27 August 1977 (age 49)
- Place of birth: Krasnodar, Russian SFSR
- Height: 1.87 m (6 ft 1 1/2 in)
- Position: Goalkeeper

Team information
- Current team: Afips Afipsky (GK coach)

Senior career*
Years	Team	Apps	(Gls)
1995–1996	Izumrud Timashyovsk	48	(0)
1996–1999	Shakhtar-2 Donetsk	0	(0)
1996–1999	→ Shakhtar-2 Donetsk	47	(0)
2000	Tsentr-R-Kavkaz Krasnodar		
2001	Kuban Krasnodar	1	(0)
2002	Spartak Yerevan	19	(0)
2003	Banants	22	(0)
2004–2013	Metalurh Donetsk	43	(0)
2004	→ Metalurh-2 Donetsk	2	(0)
2005	→ Metalurh Zaporizhya (loan)	1	(0)
2014–2015	Afips Afipsky	0	(0)

Managerial career
- 2013: Metalurh Donetsk (U19 GK coach)
- 2014–2015: Afips Afipsky (administrator)
- 2015–: Afips Afipsky (GK coach)
- * Club domestic league appearances and goals

Dmitriy Aleksandrovich Vorobyov (Russian: Дмитрий Александрович Воробьёв; born 27 August 1977) is a Russian football official and a former goalkeeper. He also holds Ukrainian citizenship. He works as a goalkeepers coach for FC Afips Afipsky.
