= Vyacheslav Checher =

Ukrainian footballer

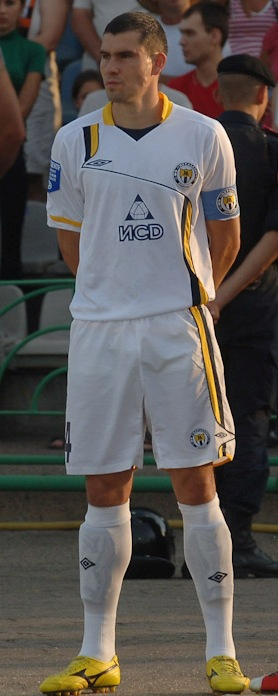

Personal information
- Full name: Vyacheslav Leonidovych Checher
- Date of birth: 15 December 1980 (age 45)
- Place of birth: Mykolaiv, Soviet Union (now Ukraine)
- Height: 1.87 m (6 ft 2 in)
- Position: Defender

Youth career
- 1986–1995: Mykolaiv
- 1995–1998: Dnipro-75 Dnipropetrovsk

Senior career*
Years	Team	Apps	(Gls)
1999–2001	Kryvbas Kryvyi Rih	33	(3)
1999–2000	→ Kryvbas-2 Kryvyi Rih	41	(1)
2002–2010	Metalurh Donetsk	254	(22)
2002–2003	→ Metalurh-2 Donetsk	3	(0)
2010–2011	Karpaty Lviv	9	(1)
2011–2015	Metalurh Donetsk	72	(8)
2015–2019	Zorya Luhansk	47	(1)
Total		459	(36)

International career
2004	Ukraine	5	(0)

Managerial career
- 2021: VPK-Ahro Shevchenkivka (assistant)
- * Club domestic league appearances and goals as of 1 July 2019

Vyacheslav Leonidovych Checher (Ukrainian: В'ячеслав Леонідович Чечер; born 15 December 1980) is a Ukrainian retired professional footballer who played as a defender.

== International career ==
Checher made his debut for Ukraine on 18 February 2004 in an away draw with Libya (1:1). He replaced Serhiy Symonenko on 62nd minute.

After playing only 5 matches, in 2004 along with Serhiy Zakarlyuka and Oleksandr Zotov he was expelled from the camp of the national team with a scandal for violating the regime due tardiness. According to Serhiy Zakarlyuka, it may have been due to personal issues with coach Semen Altman. In interview to a local television program "Profutbol", Checher commented "Don’t think that we are some kinds of monks or robots who came to training, worked and went back. No, we are all living people, we all want to relax, restore strength". The Football Federation of Ukraine president Hryhoriy Surkis at a press-conference stated “Roughly violating all the norms of ethics, morality, good conduct and the laws of partnership, on the evening of the game with the Turks, Checher, Zotov and Zakarlyuka were not present at the recovery events on Friday evening”.
