= Oleksandr Volovyk =

Ukrainian footballer (born 1985)

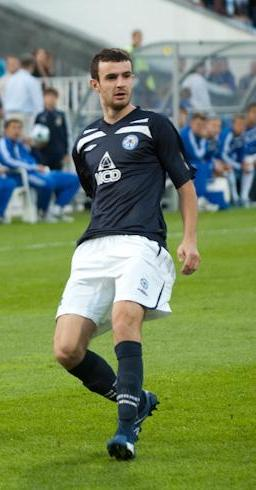
- Volovyk playing for Metalurh Donetsk in 2009

Personal information
- Full name: Oleksandr Ihorovych Volovyk
- Date of birth: 28 October 1985 (age 41)
- Place of birth: Krasyliv, Soviet Union (now Ukraine)
- Height: 1.85 m (6 ft 1 in)
- Position: Centre-back

Team information
- Current team: Podillya Khmelnytskyi (caretaker)

Youth career
- 1998–2000: DYuSSh-1 Khmelnytskyi
- 2002: Dynamo Khmelnytskyi

Senior career*
Years	Team	Apps	(Gls)
2003–2006	Podillya Khmelnytskyi	57	(3)
2006	FC Iskra-Podillya Teofipol	1	(0)
2006–2013	Metalurh Donetsk	135	(8)
2007	→ Stal Alchevsk (loan)	18	(5)
2013–2017	Shakhtar Donetsk	4	(0)
2015–2016	→ OH Leuven (loan)	14	(0)
2017	Aktobe	22	(0)
2018	Akzhayik	1	(0)
2018–2022	Podillya Khmelnytskyi	66	(4)
Total		318	(20)

Managerial career
- 2018–2022: Podillya Khmelnytskyi (assistant coach)
- 2025–: Podillya Khmelnytskyi (caretaker)
- * Club domestic league appearances and goals

Oleksandr Ihorovych Volovyk (Ukrainian: Олександр Ігорович Воловик; born 28 October 1985) is a Ukrainian retired professional football player and current manager.

== Career ==
On 10 June 2013, Volovyk signed four-year contract with Shakhtar Donetsk.

On 20 August 2015, Belgian club Oud-Heverlee Leuven announced that Volovyk was arriving on loan for one season.

== Managerial career ==
On 21 October 2025, Volovyk was announced as the caretaker manager of Podillya Khmelnytskyi.
