= Danilo (footballer, born 1990) =

Brazilian-born Belgian footballer

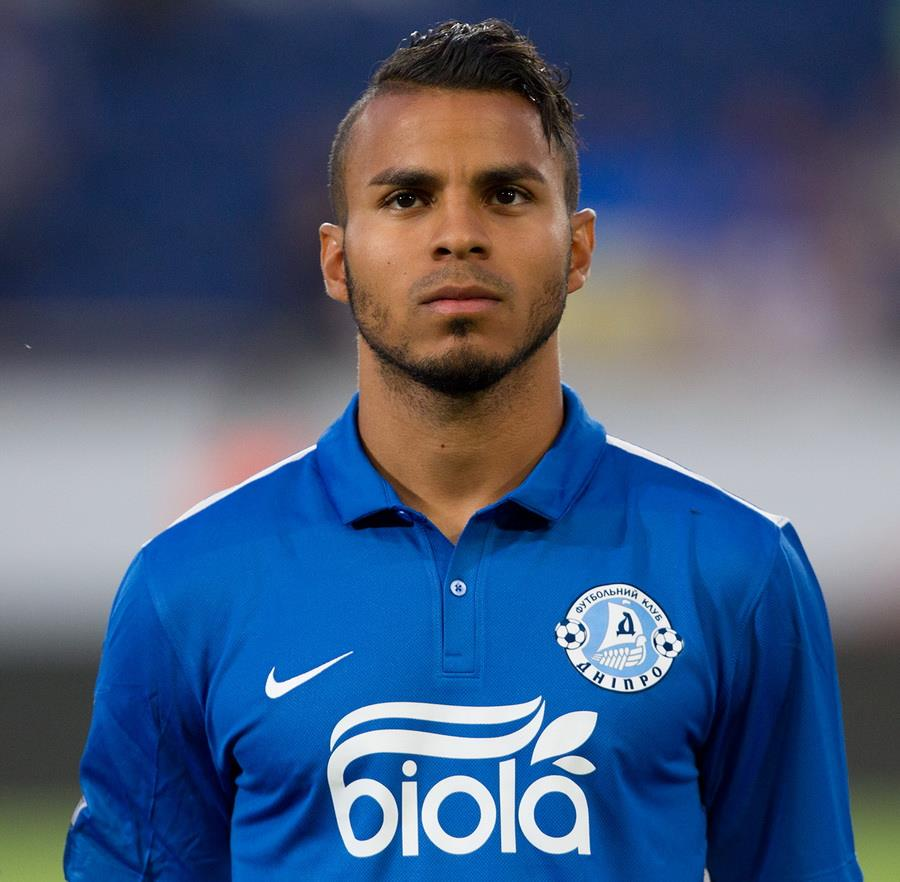
- Danilo with FC Dnipro in 2015

Personal information
- Full name: Richard Danilo Maciel Sousa Campos
- Date of birth: 13 January 1990 (age 36)
- Place of birth: São Luís, Brazil
- Height: 1.74 m (5 ft 9 in)
- Position: Attacking midfielder

Youth career
- 2007–2010: Ajax

Senior career*
Years	Team	Apps	(Gls)
2010–2012	Standard Liège	3	(0)
2012–2014	Metalurh Donetsk	41	(2)
2014–2015	Mordovia Saransk	16	(1)
2015	Dnipro Dnipropetrovsk	12	(0)
2016–2018	Antalyaspor	61	(2)
2019	Al Wahda	0	(0)
2019–2020	Dinamo Minsk	33	(8)
2020–2021	AEL Limassol	27	(6)
2021–2022	APOEL	14	(0)

International career
2008	Belgium U18	4	(1)
2007–2009	Belgium U19	10	(0)
2010	Belgium U20	3	(1)
2010–2011	Belgium U21	2	(0)
- * Club domestic league appearances and goals

Richard Danilo Maciel Sousa Campos (born 13 January 1990), known as just Danilo, is a former professional footballer who played as an attacking midfielder.

== Club career ==
Danilo signed a youth contract with Dutch club Ajax in June 2007, and was a member of their squad for the 2009–10 UEFA Europa League.

He made his professional debut for Belgian club Standard Liège during the 2010–11 season, before moving to Ukrainian team Metalurh Donetsk in February 2012.

He signed for Mordovia Saransk in July 2014, and for Dnipro Dnipropetrovsk in 2015. He signed for Turkish club Antalyaspor in January 2016. After a brief spell with Al Wahda, in February 2019 he signed for Dinamo Minsk. On 29 June 2020, he left the club as his contract expired. He then signed for AEL Limassol.

After playing with AEL Limassol, he signed for APOEL in July 2021.

== International career ==
Born in Brazil, Danilo represented Belgium at youth international level.

== Personal life ==
His father is former player Wamberto. His brother Wanderson is also a footballer who plays as an attacker.
