= Donetsk derby =

- Other names: Donbas derby
- Location: (Ukraine) Donetsk
- Teams: Metalurh; Olimpik; Shakhtar; Titan
- First meeting: Shakhtar 2–0 Metalurh (17 October 1997); 1997–98 Vyshcha Liha
- Latest meeting: Olimpik 0–1 Shakhtar (6 March 2021); 2020–21 Ukrainian Premier League
- Stadiums: Stadion Metalurh (Metalurh); Tsentralnyi stadion "Shakhtar" (Shakhtar); Olimpik Sports Complex (Olimpik); Stadion Smolianka (Titan)

Statistics
- Total meetings: 39
- Most wins: Shakhtar (34)
- Top scorer: (Ukraine) Andriy Vorobey (7 goals)
- All-time record: Shakhtar: 34; Draw: 3 Metalurh: 2
- Largest victory: Shakhtar 6–0 Olimpik (15 March 2015); 2014–15 Ukrainian Premier League
- Largest goal scoring: Olimpik 2–5 Shakhtar (24 August 2018); 2018–19 Ukrainian Premier League

The Donetsk derby (Ukrainian: Донецьке дербі, Donetske derbi) is the name given by the media to a football derby contested by any two of Shakhtar, Metalurh, Olimpik, Titan - the four Ukrainian professional clubs that play in the Ukrainian championship in Donetsk, Ukrainian city in the Donbas. It also may include some of their reserve teams, such as Shakhtar-2, Shakhtar-3, and Metalurh-2. The most prominent of all could be considered a match-up between Shakhtar and Metalurh. The derby was also called the Donbas derby. The derby was discontinued soon after the Russian aggression against Ukraine in 2014.

While Donetsk hosted professional clubs at least since 1936, the two clubs (Shakhtar and Lokomotyv) that existed during the Soviet period never met as they played at different tiers of the Soviet football league pyramid. The first ever derby between two clubs from Donetsk took place on 17 October 1997, when Shakhtar beat Metalurh 2–0 at Tsentralnyi stadion "Shakhtar". The derby kicked off during the 1997–98 Vyshcha Liha season when Metalurh received its promotion from the Ukrainian First League. In a total of 39 matches between those clubs, Shakhtar won 34, drew 3, and Metalurh won 2.

The last ever derby was played on 6 March 2021, when Shakhtar beat Olimpik 1–0 at Stadion Dynamo imeni Lobanovskoho in Kyiv.

== Shakhtar vs Metalurh ==
=== Statistics ===
Competition	Played	Shakhtar	Draw	Metalurh	Shakhtar goals	Metalurh goals
Premier League	36	32	3	1	87	19
Cup	2	1	0	1	3	3
Super Cup	1	1	0	0	2	0
Total	39	34	3	2	92	22

=== Results ===
==== League ====
17 October 1997 1997–98	Shakhtar Donetsk	2–0	Metalurh Donetsk	Donetsk
EET (UTC+3)	Seleznyov 31'; Leonov (yellow card) 50' (goal) 66' (pen.)	Report		Stadium: Shakhtar Stadium; Attendance: 12,000; Referee: Valeriy Onufer

17 March 1998 1997–98	Metalurh Donetsk	1–2	Shakhtar Donetsk	Dokuchaievsk
EET (UTC+2)	Sevidov (yellow card) 52'; Belichenko 68' (pen.)	Report	Štolcers 21', 66'; Zhunenko (yellow card) 81'	Stadium: Avanhard Stadium; Attendance: 4,000; Referee: Ihor Yarmenchuk

30 October 1998 1998–99	Shakhtar Donetsk	4–2	Metalurh Donetsk	Donetsk
EET (UTC+2)	Starostyak (yellow card) 24'; Zhunenko (yellow card) 42'; Kovalyov 57', 71'; Matvyeyev 78'; Popov 79'	Report	Dorokhov (yellow card) 28' (yellow-red card) 65'; Mintenko 31' (pen.); Oleynik (yellow card) 44'; Voloshyn 87'	Stadium: Shakhtar Stadium; Attendance: 8,000; Referee: Anatoliy Zhosan

7 March 1999 1998–99	Metalurh Donetsk	0–4	Shakhtar Donetsk	Donetsk
EET (UTC+2)	Bulgakov (yellow card) 9'; Voloshyn (yellow card) 25'	Report	Popov 51'; Zubov 61'; Tymoshchuk 77'; Vorobey 81'	Stadium: RSC Olimpiyskiy; Attendance: 4,000; Referee: Vadym Shevchenko

7 November 1999 1999–2000	Metalurh Donetsk	2–3	Shakhtar Donetsk	Donetsk
EET (UTC+2)	Zhunenko 51'; Sevidov 90' (pen.)	Report	Štolcers 13', 37'; Zubov 32' (pen.); Shelayev (yellow card) 68'	Stadium: Shakhtar Stadium; Attendance: 13,000; Referee: Vladimir Kutsev

18 March 2000 1999–2000	Shakhtar Donetsk	2–0	Metalurh Donetsk	Makiivka
EET (UTC+2)	Vorobey 20'; Pestryakov 42'	Report		Stadium: Avanhard Stadium; Attendance: 3,000; Referee: Vitaliy Hodulian

12 July 2000 2000–01	Shakhtar Donetsk	3–0	Metalurh Donetsk	Donetsk
EEST (UTC+3)	Vorobey 12', 71'; Tymoshchuk 58'	Report		Stadium: Shakhtar Stadium; Attendance: 12,000; Referee: Vyacheslav Zhukov

19 June 2001 2000–01	Metalurh Donetsk	1–3	Shakhtar Donetsk	Donetsk
EEST (UTC+3)	Shyshchenko (yellow card) 15'; Mintenko 40'	Report	Vorobey 3', 20'; Atelkin 13'	Stadium: RSC Olimpiyskiy; Attendance: 3,000; Referee: Vyacheslav Zhukov

15 September 2001 2001–02	Shakhtar Donetsk	3–1	Metalurh Donetsk	Donetsk
EEST (UTC+3)	Vorobey 56'; Zubov 61' (pen.); Aghahowa 78'	Report	Shyshchenko 44'	Stadium: Shakhtar Stadium; Attendance: 22,000; Referee: Vyacheslav Zhukov

8 April 2002 2001–02	Metalurh Donetsk	0–1	Shakhtar Donetsk	Donetsk
EEST (UTC+3)		Report	Byelik 70'; Starostyak (yellow card) 76'	Stadium: Metalurh Stadium; Attendance: 3,500; Referee: Oleg Zubarev

27 September 2002 2002–03	Shakhtar Donetsk	3–1	Metalurh Donetsk	Donetsk
EEST (UTC+3)	Byelik 45'; Vorobey (yellow card) 60'; Hai 61'; Brandão 80'	Report	Ponomarenko 90+1'	Stadium: Shakhtar Stadium; Attendance: 15,000; Referee: Oleg Zubarev

12 April 2003 2002–03	Metalurh Donetsk	0–2	Shakhtar Donetsk	Donetsk
EEST (UTC+3)		Report	Byelik 42', 88'	Stadium: Metalurh Stadium; Attendance: 3,550; Referee: Vyacheslav Zhukov

11 September 2003 2003–04	Metalurh Donetsk	1–3	Shakhtar Donetsk	Donetsk
EEST (UTC+3)	Demetradze (yellow card) 3'; Gjuzelov 37'; Jamarauli (yellow card) 56'	Report	Beqiri 26' (o.g.); Aghahowa 58'; Pukanych 80'	Stadium: RSC Olimpiyskiy; Attendance: 5,500; Referee: Igor Ishchenko

14 March 2003 2003–04	Shakhtar Donetsk	2–0	Metalurh Donetsk	Donetsk
EET (UTC+2)	Raț (yellow card) 31'; Gleveckas (yellow card) 34'; Brandão 36' (pen.); Lewandowski 59'	Report	Zotov (yellow card) 33'; Shyshchenko (yellow card) 38'; Checher (yellow card) 54'; Melikyan (yellow card) 57'; Alekseenko (yellow card) 79'	Stadium: RSC Olimpiyskiy; Attendance: 20,0000; Referee: Vitaliy Hodulian

31 July 2004 2004–05	Shakhtar Donetsk	3–0	Metalurh Donetsk	Donetsk
EEST (UTC+3)	Matuzalém (yellow card) 54' (goal) 60'; Marica 59'; Duljaj (yellow card) 66'; Aghahowa 89'	Report	Alekseenko (yellow card) 79'; Zotov (yellow card) 28'; Demetradze (yellow card) 45+2'; Neziri (yellow card) 52'; Checher (yellow card) 79'	Stadium: RSC Olimpiyskiy; Attendance: 22,200; Referee: Evgeniy Abrosimov

21 May 2005 2004–05	Metalurh Donetsk	1–3	Shakhtar Donetsk	Donetsk
EEST (UTC+3)	Demetradze (yellow card) 37' (goal) 69'; Né (yellow card) 42'	Report	Brandão 21'; Elano (yellow card) 39' (goal) 45'; Matuzalém 56'	Stadium: Shakhtar Stadium; Attendance: 24,000; Referee: Serhiy Shebek

23 October 2005 2005–06	Shakhtar Donetsk	2–0	Metalurh Donetsk	Donetsk
EEST (UTC+3)	Jádson 26'; Matuzalém 72'; Srna (yellow card) 75'	Report	Shyshchenko (yellow card) 42'	Stadium: RSC Olimpiyskiy; Attendance: 15,000; Referee: Sergey Berezka

30 April 2006 2005–06	Metalurh Donetsk	1–3	Shakhtar Donetsk	Donetsk
EEST (UTC+3)	Mitu (yellow card) 5'; Checher 49'	Report	Brandão 16' (yellow card) 31'; Chyhrynskyi 27'; Lewandowski (yellow card) 48'; Marica 77'	Stadium: Shakhtar Stadium; Attendance: 22,000; Referee: Oleh Derevinskyi

19 August 2006 2006–07	Metalurh Donetsk	0–0	Shakhtar Donetsk	Donetsk
EEST (UTC+3)	Boussaïdi (yellow card) 26'; Melnik (yellow card) 45+1'; Zé Leandro (yellow card) 60'; Demetradze (yellow card) 79'; Sérgio (yellow card) 90+2'; Virt (yellow card) 90+4'	Report	Matuzalém (yellow card) 30'; Lewandowski (yellow card) 59'; Tymoshchuk (yellow card) 90+2'	Stadium: Shakhtar Stadium; Attendance: 22,000; Referee: Florian Meyer

19 March 2007 2006–07	Shakhtar Donetsk	2–1	Metalurh Donetsk	Donetsk
EET (UTC+2)	Elano (yellow card) 9'; Vukić 27'; Kucher (yellow card) 49'; Chyhrynskyi (yellow card) 57'; Beqiri 63' (o.g.); Marica (yellow card) 90+3'	Report	Zézé (yellow card) 5' (goal) 77'; Zé Leandro (yellow card) 9'; Mendoza (yellow card) 23'; Volovyk (yellow card) 29'; Fernández (yellow card) 84'	Stadium: Shakhtar Stadium; Attendance: 17,300; Referee: Vladimir Sirenko

3 November 2007 2007–08	Metalurh Donetsk	0–1	Shakhtar Donetsk	Donetsk
16:00 EET (UTC+2)	Havryushov (yellow card) 48'; Bulut (yellow card) 60'; Danylovskyi (yellow card) 64'; Dišljenković (yellow card) 74'; Bilozor (yellow card) 87'; Mendoza (yellow card) 88'	Report	Jádson (yellow card) 59'; Brandão (yellow card) 67'; Srna (yellow card) 68'; Ilsinho (red card) 70'; Fernandinho 88'; Pyatov (yellow card) 90+3'	Stadium: Shakhtar Stadium; Attendance: 18,000; Referee: Yury Moseychuk

17 May 2008 2007–08	Shakhtar Donetsk	4–1	Metalurh Donetsk	Donetsk
18:00 EEST (UTC+3)	Srna (yellow card) 8'; Jádson 12'; Ilsinho 33'; Fernandinho 37'; Hladkyi (penalty missed) 65'; Kravchenko 66'; Chyhrynskyi (yellow card) 78'	Report	Checher (yellow card) 49'; Kosyrin 50' (yellow card) 80'; Gvozdenović (yellow card) 63'	Stadium: RSC Olimpiyskiy; Attendance: 26,000; Referee: Vladimir Sirenko

27 September 2008 2008–09	Shakhtar Donetsk	1–1	Metalurh Donetsk	Donetsk
19:00 EEST (UTC+3)	Seleznyov (yellow card) 11'; Ilsinho (yellow card) 39' (goal) 50'; Brandão (yellow card) 61'; Chyhrynskyi (yellow card) 90+3'	Report	Dimitrov 90'	Stadium: RSC Olimpiyskiy; Attendance: 20,000; Referee: Oleg Zubarev

19 April 2009 2008–09	Metalurh Donetsk	1–2	Shakhtar Donetsk	Donetsk
16:00 EEST (UTC+3)	Sytnik (yellow card) 42'; Checher (yellow card) 43'; Fernandes 52'; Makrides (yellow card) 79'; Dimitrov (yellow card) 85'	Report	Checher 15' (o.g.); Hübschman 54'; Srna (yellow card) 87'	Stadium: Metalurh Stadium; Attendance: 3,500; Referee: Yevhen Herenda

9 August 2009 2009–10	Shakhtar Donetsk	4–1	Metalurh Donetsk	Donetsk
20:00 EEST (UTC+3)	Polyanskyi 11'; Hladkyi 47', 60'; Kucher 90+2'	Report	Kingsley 72'; Makrides (yellow card) 76'; Bilozor (yellow card) 90'	Stadium: RSC Olimpiyskiy; Attendance: 13,500; Referee: Yevgen Venger

7 March 2010 2009–10	Metalurh Donetsk	0–1	Shakhtar Donetsk	Donetsk
14:30 EET (UTC+2)		Report	Kobin (yellow card) 41'; Hladkyi 45', (yellow card) 65'; Luiz Adriano (red card) 84'; Pyatov (yellow card) 90+2'	Stadium: Metalurh Stadium; Attendance: 4,000; Referee: Yevhen Herenda

15 October 2010 2010–11	Metalurh Donetsk	0–2	Shakhtar Donetsk	Donetsk
19:30 EEST (UTC+3)		Report	Chyhrynskyi 9'; Teixeira 19'	Stadium: Metalurh Stadium; Attendance: 5,000; Referee: Oleg Derevynskiy

7 May 2011 2010–11	Shakhtar Donetsk	2–0	Metalurh Donetsk	Donetsk
18:00 EEST (UTC+3)	Luiz Adriano 45+2'; Hübschman (yellow card) 73'; Srna 86'	Report	Pryima (yellow card) 26'; Adeleye (yellow card) 80'	Stadium: Donbas Arena; Attendance: 28,541; Referee: Sergiy Boyko

16 July 2011 2011–12	Metalurh Donetsk	0–2	Shakhtar Donetsk	Donetsk
19:00 EEST (UTC+3)	Pizzelli (yellow card) 43'; Volovyk (yellow card) 45+1'; Fernandes (yellow card) 60'	Report	Srna 45+1'; Douglas Costa (yellow card) 53'; Willian 64'	Stadium: Metalurh Stadium; Attendance: 4,700; Referee: Anatoliy Abdula

19 November 2011 2011–12	Shakhtar Donetsk	2–0	Metalurh Donetsk	Donetsk
16:00 EET (UTC+2)	Luiz Adriano 64' (pen.); Shevchuk (yellow card) 77', (goal) 88'	Report		Stadium: Donbas Arena; Attendance: 28,023; Referee: Ihor Ishchenko

11 November 2012 2012–13	Metalurh Donetsk	0–4	Shakhtar Donetsk	Donetsk
16:00 EET (UTC+2)	Makrides (yellow card) 90+3'	Report	Eduardo 10'; Mkhitaryan 23', 37'; Teixeira 90+1'; Willian (yellow card) 90+3'	Stadium: Metalurh Stadium; Attendance: 4,500; Referee: Yuri Mozharovskiy

26 May 2013 2012–13	Shakhtar Donetsk	4–0	Metalurh Donetsk	Donetsk
18:00 EEST (UTC+3)	Douglas Costa 24'; Taison (yellow card) 39' (goal) 74'; Mkhitaryan 49'; Eduardo (yellow card) 62' (goal) 87'; Stepanenko (yellow card) 65'; Srna (yellow card) 73'	Report	Checher (yellow card) 64'; Moraes (yellow card) 71'; Mkrtchyan (yellow card) 76'; Danilo (yellow card) 82'	Stadium: Donbas Arena; Attendance: 48,617; Referee: Victor Shvetsov

28 September 2013 2013–14	Metalurh Donetsk	2–2	Shakhtar Donetsk	Donetsk
18:30 EEST (UTC+3)	Nelson (yellow card) 21'; Rakitskyi 24' (o.g.); Checher (yellow card) 42'; Moraes (yellow card) 45+2' (goal) 51'; Pryima (yellow card) 66'; Alexandre (yellow card) 71'; Daniel (yellow card) 90'	Report	Douglas Costa (yellow card) 38'; Teixeira 54'; Ilsinho (yellow card) 76'; Eduardo 82'	Stadium: Metalurh Stadium; Attendance: 3,500; Referee: Serhiy Boyko

19 April 2014 2013–14	Shakhtar Donetsk	2–1	Metalurh Donetsk	Donetsk
17:00 EEST (UTC+3)	Srna (yellow card) 32'; Kryvtsov 55'; Luiz Adriano 62'; Ilsinho (yellow card) 86'; Teixeira (yellow card) 89'	Report	Bolbat (yellow card) 34'; Pryima 49'; Checher (yellow card) 78'	Stadium: Donbas Arena; Attendance: 23,770; Referee: Victor Shvetsov

31 October 2014 2014–15	Metalurh Donetsk	2–1	Shakhtar Donetsk	Kyiv
19:00 EET (UTC+2)	Baranovskyi (yellow card) 49'; Pryima (yellow card) 61'; Morozyuk 73'; Lazić 75'	Report	Rakitskyi (yellow card) 58'; Srna 82'	Stadium: Obolon Arena; Attendance: 2,500; Referee: Yury Vaks
Note: Match played at the Obolon Arena, Kyiv instead of Shakhtar's regular stadium, Metalurh Stadium, Donetsk, due to the War in Donbas.

15 May 2015 2014–15	Shakhtar Donetsk	2–0	Metalurh Donetsk	Lviv
17:00 EEST (UTC+3)	Teixeira 9', 45+2'; Fred (yellow card) 53'	Report	Morozyuk (yellow card) 15'; Checher (yellow card) 54' (red card) 54'; Makrides (yellow card) 75'	Stadium: Arena Lviv; Attendance: 5,117; Referee: Yaroslav Kozyk
Note: Match played at the Arena Lviv, Lviv instead of Shakhtar's regular stadium, Donbas Arena, Donetsk, due to the War in Donbas.

==== Cup ====
24 March 2010 2009–10; Semi-final	Metalurh Donetsk	2–1	Shakhtar Donetsk	Donetsk
18:00 EET (UTC+2)	Mguni 6'; Dimitrov 9'; Yankov (yellow card) 31' (yellow-red card) 75'; Dimitrov (yellow card) 49'; Dišljenković (yellow card) 69'	Report	Srna (yellow card) 42'; Hladkyy (yellow card) 42'; Ischenko (yellow card) 61'; Fernandihno 90+2'	Stadium: Metalurh Stadium; Attendance: 5,100; Referee: Oleh Zubariev

6 May 2012 2011–12; Final	Metalurh Donetsk	1–2	Shakhtar Donetsk	Kyiv
19.30 EEST (UTC+3)	Mkrtchyan (yellow card) 23'; Ghazaryan (yellow card) 25'; Morozyuk 69'; Soares (yellow card) 80'	Report	Mkhitaryan (yellow card) 18'; Teixeira 23'; Fernandinho (yellow card) 90+4'; Kucher 104'	Stadium: NSC Olimpiyskiy; Attendance: 47,314; Referee: Anatoliy Abdula

==== Super cup ====
10 July 2012	Shakhtar Donetsk	2–0	Metalurh Donetsk	Luhansk
21:00 EEST (UTC+3)	Luiz Adriano 6'; Kucher (yellow card) 26'; Douglas Costa 35'; Stepanenko (yellow card) 60'; Rakytskiy (yellow card) 63'; Dević (yellow card) 85'	Report	Volovyk (yellow card) 69' (yellow-red card) 85'; Checher (yellow card) 81'	Stadium: Avanhard Stadium; Attendance: 21,050; Referee: Anatoliy Abdula

=== Player Statistics ===
==== Goalscorers ====
	Name	Club	Years	League	Cup	Supercup	Total
1	(Ukraine) Andriy Vorobey	Shakhtar Donetsk; Metalurh Donetsk	1995–2007; 2010–2013	7; 0	0; 0	0; 0	7
2	(Brazil) Alex Teixeira	Shakhtar Donetsk	2007–2015	5	1	0	6
3	(Latvia) Andrejs Štolcers	Shakhtar Donetsk	1997–2000	4	0	0	4
3	(Ukraine) Oleksiy Byelik	Shakhtar Donetsk	1998–2008	4	0	0	4
3	(Brazil) Brandão	Shakhtar Donetsk	2002–2009	4	0	0	4
3	(Brazil) Luiz Adriano	Shakhtar Donetsk	2007–2015	3	0	1	4
3	Own goals	Shakhtar Donetsk; Metalurh Donetsk		3; 1	0; 0	0; 0	4
8	(Ukraine) Hennadiy Zubov	Shakhtar Donetsk; Metalurh Donetsk	1994–2004; 2005	3; 0	0; 0	0; 0	3
8	(Nigeria) Julius Aghahowa	Shakhtar Donetsk	2000–2007, 2009–2012	3	0	0	3
8	(Brazil) Matuzalém	Shakhtar Donetsk	2004–2007	3	0	0	3
8	(Brazil) Fernandinho	Shakhtar Donetsk	2005–2013	2	1	0	3
8	(Ukraine) Oleksandr Hladkyi	Shakhtar Donetsk	2007–2010, 2014–2016	3	0	0	3
8	(Croatia) Darijo Srna	Shakhtar Donetsk	2003–2018	3	0	0	3
8	(Croatia) Eduardo	Shakhtar Donetsk	2010–2014, 2015–2016	3	0	0	3
8	(Armenia) Henrikh Mkhitaryan	Metalurh Donetsk; Shakhtar Donetsk	2009–2010; 2010–2013	0; 3	0; 0	0; 0	3
16	(Ukraine) Serhiy Kovalyov	Shakhtar Donetsk	1994–2000	2	0	0	2
16	(Ukraine) Serhiy Popov	Shakhtar Donetsk	1992–1996, 1997–2004	2	0	0	2
16	(Ukraine) Vitaliy Mintenko	Metalurh Donetsk	1997–2001	2	0	0	2
16	(Ukraine) Anatoliy Tymoshchuk	Shakhtar Donetsk	1998–2007	2	0	0	2
16	(Romania) Ciprian Marica	Shakhtar Donetsk	2004–2007	2	0	0	2
16	(Brazil) Jádson	Shakhtar Donetsk	2005–2011	2	0	0	2
16	(Ukraine) Dmytro Chyhrynskyi	Shakhtar Donetsk	2002–2009, 2010–2015, 2023	2	0	0	2
16	(Brazil) Ilsinho	Shakhtar Donetsk	2007–2010, 2012–2015	2	0	0	2
16	(Bulgaria) Velizar Dimitrov	Metalurh Donetsk	2008–2013	1	1	0	2
16	(Ukraine) Oleksandr Kucher	Metalurh Donetsk; Shakhtar Donetsk	2002–2005; 2006–2017	0; 1	0; 1	0; 0	2
16	(Brazil) Douglas Costa	Shakhtar Donetsk	2010–2015	1	0	1	2
16	(Ukraine) Mykola Morozyuk	Metalurh Donetsk	2010–2015	1	1	0	2
28	(Ukraine) Yuriy Seleznyov	Shakhtar Donetsk; Metalurh Donetsk	1997–2000; 2001–2003	1; 0	0; 0	0; 0	1
28	(Ukraine) Ihor Leonov	Shakhtar Donetsk; Metalurh Donetsk	1988–1991, 1993–2000; 2000	1; 0	0; 0	0; 0	1
28	(Ukraine) Yuri Belichenko	Shakhtar Donetsk; Metalurh Donetsk	1985–1988, 1992–1994; 1996, 1997–1998	0; 1	0; 0	0; 0	1
28	(Ukraine) Oleh Matvyeyev	Shakhtar Donetsk; Metalurh Donetsk	1992–2000; 2002	1	0	0	1
28	(Ukraine) Mykola Voloshyn	Metalurh Donetsk	1994–2000	1	0	0	1
28	(Ukraine) Sergey Zhunenko	Shakhtar Donetsk; Metalurh Donetsk	1997–1999; 1999–2000	0; 1	0; 0	0; 0	1
28	(Ukraine) Oleksandr Sevidov	Metalurh Donetsk	1996–2000	1	0	0	1
28	(Ukraine) Oleh Pestryakov	Shakhtar Donetsk	1999–2002	1	0	0	1
28	(Ukraine) Serhiy Atelkin	Shakhtar Donetsk; Metalurh Donetsk	1989–1997, 2000–2002; 2002	1; 0	0; 0	0; 0	1
28	(Ukraine) Serhiy Shyshchenko	Shakhtar Donetsk; Metalurh Donetsk	1994–1997; 1999–2003, 2004–2006, 2008–2009	1; 0	0; 0	0; 0	1
28	(Ukraine) Oleksiy Hai	Shakhtar Donetsk	2000–2013	1	0	0	1
28	(Ukraine) Volodymyr Ponomarenko	Metalurh Donetsk	2001–2003	1	0	0	1
28	(North Macedonia) Igor Gjuzelov	Shakhtar Donetsk; Metalurh Donetsk	2001–2002; 2002–2006	0; 1	0; 0	0; 0	1
28	(Ukraine) Adrian Pukanych	Shakhtar Donetsk	2000–2009	1	0	0	1
28	(Poland) Mariusz Lewandowski	Shakhtar Donetsk	2001–2010	1	0	0	1
28	(Brazil) Elano	Shakhtar Donetsk	2005–2007	1	0	0	1
28	(Georgia (country)) Giorgi Demetradze	Metalurh Donetsk	2003–2007	1	0	0	1
28	(Ukraine) Vyacheslav Checher	Metalurh Donetsk	2002–2010, 2011–2015	1	0	0	1
28	(Serbia) Zvonimir Vukić	Shakhtar Donetsk	2003–2008	1	0	0	1
28	(Ivory Coast) Venance Zézé	Metalurh Donetsk	2006–2007	1	0	0	1
28	(Ukraine) Kostyantyn Kravchenko	Shakhtar Donetsk	2008–2012	1	0	0	1
28	(Ukraine) Oleksandr Kosyrin	Metalurh Donetsk	2005–2008	1	0	0	1
28	(Portugal) Ricardo Fernandes	Metalurh Donetsk	2008–2009, 2011	1	0	0	1
28	(Czech Republic) Tomáš Hübschman	Shakhtar Donetsk	2004–2014	1	0	0	1
28	(Ukraine) Oleksiy Polyanskyi	Metalurh Donetsk; Shakhtar Donetsk	2003–2006; 2006–2016	0; 1	0; 0	0; 0	1
28	(Czech Republic) Tomáš Hübschman	Shakhtar Donetsk	2004–2014	1	0	0	1
28	(Nigeria) Sunny Kingsley	Metalurh Donetsk	2008–2010	1	0	0	1
28	(Brazil) Willian	Shakhtar Donetsk	2007–2013	1	0	0	1
28	(Ukraine) Vyacheslav Shevchuk	Shakhtar Donetsk; Metalurh Donetsk	2000–2001, 2005–2016; 2002	1; 0	0; 0	0; 0	1
28	(Brazil) Taison	Shakhtar Donetsk	2013–2021	1	0	0	1
28	(Ukraine) Júnior Moraes	Metalurh Donetsk; Shakhtar Donetsk	2011–2015; 2018–2022	1; 0	0; 0	0; 0	1
28	(Ukraine) Serhiy Kryvtsov	Shakhtar Donetsk	2010–2022	1	0	0	1
28	(Ukraine) Vasyl Pryima	Metalurh Donetsk	2008–2015	1	0	0	1
28	(Serbia) Đorđe Lazić	Metalurh Donetsk	2009–2015	1	0	0	1
28	(Zimbabwe) Musawengosi Mguni	Metalurh Donetsk	2009–2010, 2013–2014	0	1	0	1

==== Clean sheets ====
	Name	Club	Years	League	Cup	Supercup	Total
1	(Ukraine) Andriy Pyatov	Shakhtar Donetsk	2007–2023	5	0	1	6
2	(Ukraine) Yuriy Virt	Metalurh Donetsk; Shakhtar Donetsk	1997–1999, 2002–2003, 2004–2007; 1999–2002, 2007–2012	1; 2	0; 0	0; 0	3
3	(Poland) Wojciech Kowalewski	Shakhtar Donetsk	2002–2003	2	0	0	2
3	(Ukraine) Dmytro Shutkov	Shakhtar Donetsk	1991–2008	2	0	0	2
3	(Croatia) Stipe Pletikosa	Shakhtar Donetsk	2003–2007	2	0	0	2
3	(Ukraine) Oleksandr Rybka	Shakhtar Donetsk	2011–2012	2	0	0	2
3	(Ukraine) Anton Kanibolotskyi	Shakhtar Donetsk	2012–2017	2	0	0	2
8	(Ukraine) Andriy Kurayev	Shakhtar Donetsk; Metalurh Donetsk	1990–1994, 1998–1999; 1997–1998, 1999–2002	1; 0	0; 0	0; 0	1
8	(Czech Republic) Jan Laštůvka	Shakhtar Donetsk	2004–2009	1	0	0	1

== Shakhtar-2 vs Metalurh ==
=== Results ===
==== League ====
5 April 1996 1995–96	Metalurh Donetsk	3–0	Shakhtar-2 Donetsk	Makiivka, Donetsk Oblast
EET (UTC+3)	Klymovskyi 36'; Androshchuk 70'; Dgebuadze 78'	Report		Stadium: Kirovets; Attendance: 800; Referee: Volodymyr Vorhul

== Shakhtar-2/3 vs Metalurh-2 ==
=== Results ===
==== League ====
25 October 1997 1997–98	Metalurh-2 Donetsk	0–1	Shakhtar-2 Donetsk	Dokuchaievsk, Donetsk Oblast
EET (UTC+3)		Report	Vorobey 52'; Onopko (yellow card)	Stadium: Avanhard; Attendance: 300; Referee: Mykhailo Khapchenkov

11 April 1998 1997–98	Shakhtar-2 Donetsk	1–2	Metalurh-2 Donetsk	Makiivka, Donetsk Oblast
EET (UTC+3)	Spivak (yellow card) ?' (yellow-red card) 47'; Onopko 75' (pen.)	Report	Zavyalov 2'; Sevidov (yellow card) (goal) 53'	Stadium: Kholodna Balka; Attendance: 500; Referee: Serhiy Zadyran

3 September 2001 2001–02	Shakhtar-3 Donetsk	3–1	Metalurh-2 Donetsk	Donetsk
EET (UTC+3)	Ulanov 7'; Holopyorov (yellow card) 13' (goal) 65'; Synchuk 24'; Kononchenko (yellow card) 77'; Konyshev (yellow card) 80'	Report	Syzykhin 10' (pen.) (yellow card) 13'; Yudin (yellow card) 15'; Altman (yellow card) 30'; Bozhenkov (yellow card) 45' (yellow-red card) 78'; Radionov (yellow card) 72'	Stadium: Tsentralnyi Shakhtar; Attendance: 200; Referee: Mykola Danylenko (Berdiansk)

18 May 2002 2001–02	Metalurh-2 Donetsk	2–1	Shakhtar-3 Donetsk	Donetsk
EET (UTC+3)	Zghura (yellow card) 11'; Seleznyov 6'; Kovalyov (yellow card) 62' (goal) 82'	Report	Tyurin 3'; Kundel (yellow card) 25'; Anelikov (yellow card) 45'; Horbkov (yellow card) 58'	Stadium: Metalurh; Attendance: 300; Referee: Ihor Podushkin (Kharkiv)

== Shakhtar vs Olimpik ==
=== Results ===
==== League ====
15 August 2014 2014–15	Olimpik Donetsk	0–5	Shakhtar Donetsk	Kyiv
17:00 EET (UTC+3)	Ohirya (yellow card) 39'; Tyshchenko (yellow card) 45+1'; Dytyatyev (yellow card) 48'	Report	Kryvtsov 17'; Taison 24'; Hladkyi 47' (yellow card) 66'; Wellington 78'; Stepanenko 90+1'	Stadium: imeni Bannikova; Attendance: 1,200; Referee: Viktor Shvetsov (Odesa)

15 March 2015 2014–15	Shakhtar Donetsk	6–0	Olimpik Donetsk	Lviv
17:00 EET (UTC+3)	Srna 8' (pen.) (yellow card) 65'; Marlos 38', 39' (yellow card) 45+1'; Hladkyi 43'; Taison (yellow card) 35' (goal) 57'; Teixeira (yellow card) 13' (goal) 87'	Report	Dytyatyev (yellow card) 5'; Lysenko (yellow card) 7'; Lebed (yellow card) 7'	Stadium: Arena Lviv; Attendance: 4,400; Referee: Viktor Shvetsov (Odesa)

26 September 2015 2015–16	Olimpik Donetsk	2–3	Shakhtar Donetsk	Kyiv
14:00 EET (UTC+3)	Kadimyan (penalty missed) 18' 18'; Partsvania (yellow card) 24'; Hryshko (yellow card) 38'; Lysenko (yellow card) 55' (goal) 66'; Postupalenko (yellow card) 67'; Condé (yellow card) 3' (yellow-red card) 77'; Ohirya (yellow card) 85'	Report	Ordets (red card) 17'; Teixeira 38' (pen.), 90' (yellow card) 90+4'; Bernard (yellow card) 69'; Rakitskyi (yellow card) 76'; Srna 78' (pen.)	Stadium: imeni Bannikova; Attendance: 1,050; Referee: Ivan Bondar (Kyiv)

17 April 2016 2015–16	Shakhtar Donetsk	3–0	Olimpik Donetsk	Lviv
17:00 EET (UTC+3)	Wellington 46'; Stepanenko (yellow card) 66'; Marlos 84' (pen.); Eduardo 90'	Report	Petrov (yellow card) 10'; Hoshkoderya (yellow card) 54'; Postupalenko (yellow card) 65'	Stadium: Arena Lviv; Attendance: 2,788; Referee: Oleksandr Derdo (Chornomorsk)

15 October 2016 2016–17	Olimpik Donetsk	1–1	Shakhtar Donetsk	Sumy
17:00 EET (UTC+3)	Oliinyk (yellow card) 76'; Matyazh 80'; Partsvania (yellow card) 85'	Report	Ferreyra (yellow card) 37'; Ordets 73'	Stadium: Yuvileiny; Attendance: 9,230; Referee: Yuriy Vaks (Khmelnytskyi)

17 March 2017 2016–17	Shakhtar Donetsk	1–1	Olimpik Donetsk	Kharkiv
19:00 EET (UTC+3)	Bernard (yellow card) 36'; Leschuk 45+2'; Marlos (yellow card) 90+5'	Report	Postupalenko (yellow card) 20' (goal) 24'; Matyazh (yellow card) 62'; Fedoriv (yellow card) 90+5'	Stadium: Metalist; Attendance: 3,800; Referee: Yevhen Aranovskyi (Kyiv)

15 April 2017 2016–17	Olimpik Donetsk	0–4	Shakhtar Donetsk	Kyiv
17:00 EET (UTC+3)	Tsymbalyuk (yellow card) 77'	Report	Taison 7'; Bernard 37'; Kovalenko 58'; Ferreyra 61' (pen.)	Stadium: Dynamo imeni Lobanovskoho; Attendance: 1,950; Referee: Serhiy Berezka (Kyiv)

21 May 2017 2016–17	Shakhtar Donetsk	1–1	Olimpik Donetsk	Kyiv
17:00 EET (UTC+3)	Butko 50' (yellow card) 79'; Ordets (yellow card) 58'; Kryvtsov (yellow card) 64'; Azevedo (yellow card) 72'	Report	Serhiychuk 12'; Shestakov (yellow card) 89'	Stadium: Dynamo imeni Lobanovskoho; Attendance: 6,631; Referee: Dmytro Kutakov (Brovary)
