= 2013–14 Ukrainian Premier League =

23rd season of top-tier football league in Vyshcha Liha

Ukrainian Premier League
- Season: 2013–14
- Champions: Shakhtar Donetsk; 9th title
- Relegated: Tavriya Simferopol
- Champions League: Shakhtar Donetsk; Dnipro Dnipropetrovsk
- Europa League: Dynamo Kyiv; Metalist Kharkiv; Chornomorets Odesa; Zorya Luhansk
- Matches: 222
- Goals: 585 (2.64 per match)
- Top goalscorer: 20 – Luiz Adriano (Shakhtar)
- Biggest home win: Dynamo 9–1 Metalurh D (Round 12)
- Biggest away win: Tavriya 0–4 Shakhtar (Round 5); Karpaty 0–4 Dnipro (Round 13)
- Highest scoring: Dynamo 9–1 Metalurh D (Round 12)
- Longest winning run: 7 games Chornomorets (Round 4–10)
- Longest unbeaten run: 14 games Metalist (Round 1–11, 13–15)
- Longest winless run: 15 games Metalurh Z (Round 4–14, 16–19)
- Longest losing run: 8 games Metalurh Z (Round 6–13)
- Highest attendance: 59,360; Dynamo – Shakhtar (Round 24)
- Lowest attendance: 0 – 6 matches (Round 29)
- Total attendance: 2,426,553
- Average attendance: 11,286

The 2013–14 Ukrainian Premier League season was the 23rd since its establishment.

A total of sixteen teams participated in the league. Fifteen teams from last season's competition and one promoted club from the 2012–13 Ukrainian First League formed the league. The competition commenced on the 12 July 2013 when Tavriya Simferopol hosted Zorya Luhansk. Eighteen rounds were played prior to the winter recess. The competition was affected by the political turmoil that affected Ukraine during the spring session.

== Russian invasion and its effects on the league ==
In November 2013, during the winter break of the Ukrainian Premier League, a wave of demonstrations and civil unrest labelled Euromaidan started in Ukraine. The competition was to resume on 1 March 2014, but due to the Russian invasion continuing on with the Crimean crisis, the Premier League delayed the start of the spring stage. A decision was made by the Ukrainian Premier League to resume the competition on 15 March.

After the annexation of Crimea by Russia in March 2014 the teams from Crimea, namely Sevastopol and Tavriya Simferopol, continued to participate in the competition.

During the May 2014 pro-Russian conflict in Ukraine the Football Federation of Ukraine (after being advised to do so by the Ukrainian Interior Ministry) decided that all matches across all Ukrainian leagues, as well as the 2014 Ukrainian Cup Final, would be played behind closed doors for security reasons.

The unrest in Ukraine since November 2013 led to an unexpected sense of unity among rival Ukrainian football fans. Various formerly bitter rival football fans (also those from Russophone cities in Ukraine) held pro-Ukrainian Unity marches.

== Teams ==
=== Promoted ===
- FC Sevastopol, champion of the 2012-13 Ukrainian First League (returning after absence of 2 seasons)

Stal Alchevsk were to be promoted after finishing runners-up but their club administration refused promotion.

Hoverla Uzhhorod, the 15th placed team was allowed to stay in the Premier League after they passed attestation.

Metalurh Zaporizhzhia, the last-placed of the 2012–13 Ukrainian Premier League was to be relegated to the Ukrainian First League at the end of the previous season but since no other team applied for entry from the Ukrainian First League they remained in the competition.

=== Location map ===
Locations of team home grounds in the 2013–14 Ukrainian Premier League
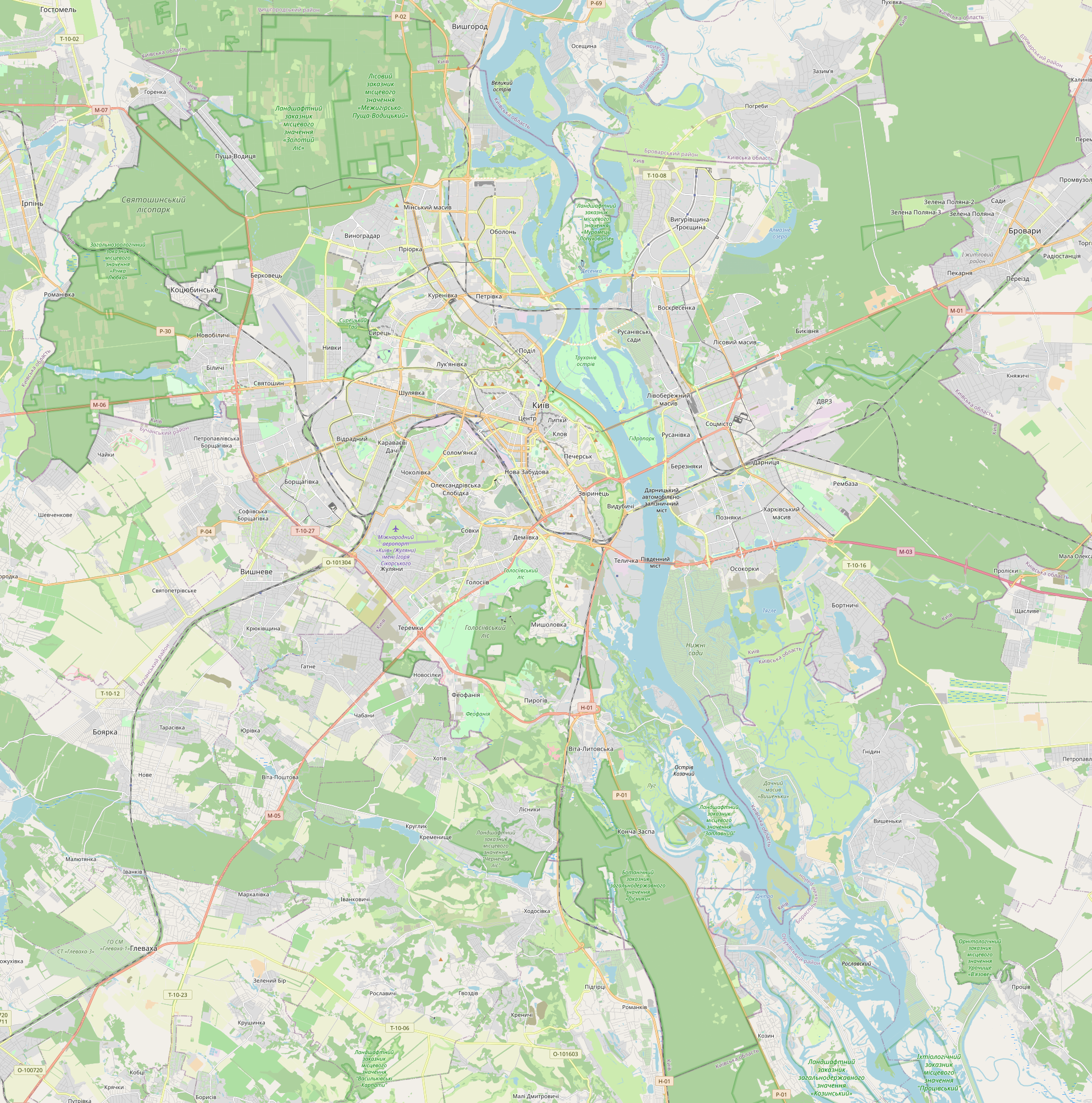
Kyiv city home venues of teams in the League

=== Stadiums ===
The following stadiums are regarded as home grounds:

Rank	Stadium	Club	Capacity	Highest attendance		Notes
1	NSC Olimpiyskiy	Dynamo Kyiv	70,050	59,360	Round 24 (Shakhtar)	Originally scheduled as Round 19
1	NSC Olimpiyskiy	Tavriya Simferopol	70,050	11,575	Round 19 (Dynamo)	Used as home ground in Round 19
1	NSC Olimpiyskiy	Illichivets Mariupol	70,050	0	Round 29 (Dynamo)	Used as home ground in Round 29
2	Donbas Arena	Shakhtar Donetsk	52,518	52,667	Round 4 (Dynamo)	
3	OSC Metalist	Metalist Kharkiv	40,003	39,853	Round 9 (Dynamo)	
4	Chornomorets Stadium	Chornomorets Odesa	34,164	26,542	Round 26 (Dynamo)	Originally scheduled as Round 20
5	Dnipro-Arena	Dnipro Dnipropetrovsk	31,003	28,092	Round 7 (Shakhtar)	
6	Ukraina Stadium	Karpaty Lviv	28,051	18,800	Round 23 (Dynamo)	Originally scheduled as Round 25
7	Vorskla Stadium	Vorskla Poltava	24,795	12,500	Round 11 (Dynamo)	
8	Meteor Stadium	Metalurh Donetsk	24,381	0	Round 29 (Metalurh Z.)	Used as home ground in Round 29
9	Avanhard Stadium	Zorya Luhansk	22,288	13,700	Round 15 (Dynamo)	
10	RSC Lokomotiv	Tavriya Simferopol	19,978	10,500	Round 5 (Shakhtar)	
11	Dynamo Stadium	Arsenal Kyiv	16,873	10,841	Round 13 (Dynamo)	
11	Dynamo Stadium	Sevastopol	16,873	850	Round 20 (Metalist)	Used as home ground in postponed Round 20 match
11	Dynamo Stadium	Metalist Kharkiv	16,873	1,500	Round 30 (Vorskla)	Used as home ground in Round 30 match
12	Illichivets Stadium	Illichivets Mariupol	12,680	5,600	Round 4 (Karpaty); Round 6 (Metalurh Don.)	
13	Avanhard Stadium	Volyn Lutsk	12,080	10,000	Round 16 (Dynamo)	
14	Avanhard Stadium	Hoverla Uzhhorod	12,000	10,200	Round 2 (Dynamo)	
15	Slavutych-Arena	Metalurh Zaporizhzhia	11,983	11,000	Round 5 (Dnipro)	
16	Central Stadium, Cherkasy	Zorya Luhansk	10,321	0	Round 29 (Shakhtar)	Used as home ground in Round 29
16	Central Stadium, Cherkasy	Shakhtar Donetsk	10,321	2,300	Round 30 (Volyn)	Used as home ground in Round 30
17	SC Sevastopol	Sevastopol	5,644	5,641	Round 2 (Shakhtar)	
18	Obolon Arena	Chornomorets Odesa	5,100	3,200	Round 30 (Karpaty)	Used as home ground in Round 30
19	Metalurh Stadium	Metalurh Donetsk	5,094	4,200	Round 16 (Metalist)	

=== Personnel and sponsorship ===
Team	Home city	Head coach	Captain	Kit manufacturer	Shirt sponsor
Chornomorets Odesa	Odesa	(Ukraine) Roman Hryhorchuk	(Ukraine) Dmytro Bezotosnyi	Nike	Imexbank
Dnipro Dnipropetrovsk	Dnipropetrovsk	(Spain) Juande Ramos	(Ukraine) Ruslan Rotan	Nike	Biola
Dynamo Kyiv	Kyiv	(Ukraine) Serhii Rebrov	(Ukraine) Oleksandr Shovkovskyi	adidas	Nadra Bank
Hoverla Uzhhorod	Uzhhorod	(Ukraine) Vyacheslav Hrozny	(Ukraine) Oleksandr Nad'	adidas	—
Illichivets Mariupol	Mariupol	(Ukraine) Mykola Pavlov	(Ukraine) Mykola Ishchenko	Nike	—
Karpaty Lviv	Lviv	(Ukraine) Oleksandr Sevidov	(Ukraine) Oleh Holodyuk	Joma	Favbet
Metalist Kharkiv	Kharkiv	(Ukraine) Ihor Rakhayev	(Senegal) Papa Gueye	adidas	
Metalurh Donetsk	Donetsk	(Russia) Sergei Tashuyev	(Ukraine) Vyacheslav Checher	Umbro	ISD
Metalurh Zaporizhzhia	Zaporizhzhia	(Ukraine) Oleh Taran	(Ukraine) Serhiy Rudyka	Nike	Zaporizhstal
Sevastopol	Sevastopol	(Bulgaria) Angel Chervenkov	(Serbia) Igor Duljaj	Nike	Smart Holding
Shakhtar Donetsk	Donetsk	(Romania) Mircea Lucescu	(Croatia) Darijo Srna	Nike	SCM
Tavriya Simferopol	Simferopol	(Bulgaria) Nikolay Kostov	(Tunisia) Anis Boussaïdi	Puma	Titan
Volyn Lutsk	Lutsk	(Ukraine) Vitaliy Kvartsyanyi	(North Macedonia) Vanče Šikov	adidas	—
Vorskla Poltava	Poltava	(Ukraine) Anatoliy Momot	(Albania) Armend Dallku	adidas	Ferrexpo
Zorya Luhansk	Luhansk	(Ukraine) Yuriy Vernydub	(Ukraine) Mykyta Kamenyuka	Nike	Holsten

=== Managerial changes ===
Team	Outgoing head coach	Manner of departure	Date of vacancy	Table	Incoming head coach	Date of appointment
Hoverla Uzhhorod	(Ukraine) Oleksandr Sevidov	Sacked	May 26	Pre-season	(Ukraine) Vyacheslav Hrozny	June 18
Metalurh Zaporizhzhia	(Ukraine) Serhiy Zaytsev	Sacked	May 30	Pre-season	(Ukraine) Serhiy Puchkov	June 10
Vorskla Poltava	(Ukraine) Serhiy Svystun	Reserve coach	June 10	Pre-season	(Ukraine) Vasyl Sachko	June 12
Tavriya Simferopol	(Ukraine) Oleh Luzhnyi	Sacked	June 15	Pre-season	(Greece) Giannis Christopoulos	June 17
Karpaty Lviv	(Ukraine) Yuriy Dyachuk-Stavytskyi	Interim coach	June 19	Pre-season	(Ukraine) Oleksandr Sevidov	June 19
Vorskla Poltava	(Ukraine) Vasyl Sachko	Unlicensed coach	July 4	Pre-season	(Ukraine) Anatoliy Momot	July 4
Metalurh Donetsk	(Ukraine) Yuriy Maksymov	Sacked	August 5	10th	(Ukraine) Volodymyr Pyatenko (interim)	August 5
Metalurh Donetsk	(Ukraine) Volodymyr Pyatenko	Interim coach	August 7	10th	(Russia) Sergei Tashuyev	August 7
Sevastopol	(Belarus) Aleh Konanaw	Leaves for FC Krasnodar	August 10	9th	(Ukraine) Hennadiy Orbu	August 10
Arsenal Kyiv	(Ukraine) Yuriy Bakalov	Resigns	October 10	14th	(Ukraine) Serhiy Zakarlyuka (caretaker)	October 10
Metalurh Zaporizhzhia	(Ukraine) Serhiy Puchkov	Sacked	October 28	15th	(Ukraine) Oleh Taran	October 28
Sevastopol	(Ukraine) Hennadiy Orbu	Sacked	November 27	11th	(Ukraine) Serhiy Konovalov (interim)	November 27
Tavriya	(Greece) Giannis Christopoulos	Sacked	January 9	14th	(Bulgaria) Nikolay Kostov	January 9
Sevastopol	(Ukraine) Serhiy Konovalov (interim)	Interim coach	January 14	12th	(Bulgaria) Angel Chervenkov	January 14
Metalist Kharkiv	(Ukraine) Myron Markevych	Resigned	February 24	2nd	(Ukraine) Ihor Rakhayev (interim)	February 24
Dynamo Kyiv	(Ukraine) Oleh Blokhin	Sacked	April 16	3rd	(Ukraine) Serhii Rebrov (interim)	April 17

Notes:

- ^(10) For the Round 14 match Metalist Kharkiv was managed by Ihor Rakhayev while manager Myron Markevych was hospitalized with trauma.

== Qualification to European competitions for 2014–15 ==
- Since Ukraine finished in seventh place of the UEFA country ranking after the 2012–13 season, the league will have the same number of qualifiers for UEFA Europa League 2014–15. The Ukrainian Cup winner qualifies for the play-off round.

=== Qualified teams ===
- After the 24th Round, Shakhtar Donetsk qualified for European football for the 2014–15 season.
- During the 26th Round, Dnipro Dnipropetrovsk qualified for European football for the 2014–15 season.
- During the 28th Round Shakhtar Donetsk qualified for the 2014–15 UEFA Champions League after defeating Illichivets.
- Metalist Kharkiv qualified for European football for the 2014–15 season after defeating FC Sevastopol in their postponed Round 20 match.
- Shakhtar Donetsk qualified for the 2014–15 UEFA Champions League Group Stage during Round 29 after they defeated Zorya Luhansk. (C)
- After the 29th Round, Dynamo Kyiv qualified the 2014–15 UEFA Europa League.
- After the 29th Round, Chornomorets Odesa qualified the 2014–15 UEFA Europa League 3rd qualifying round.
- Dynamo Kyiv, by winning the Ukrainian Cup, and with Sevilla (Spain) winning the 2013–14 UEFA Europa League, qualified for the 2014–15 UEFA Europa Group stage.
- Dnipro Dnipropetrovsk qualified for the 2014–15 UEFA Champions League 3rd qualifying round after they defeated Metalurh Donetsk in Round 30. After that victory Metalist Kharkiv qualified the 2014–15 UEFA Europa League playoff round.
- Zorya Luhansk qualified for the 2014–15 UEFA Europa League 2nd qualifying round after Metalurh Donetsk was excluded from participating by the UEFA Club Financial Control Body due to failing to comply with Financial Fair Play regulations.

== League table ==
Pos	Team	Pld	W	D	L	GF	GA	GD	Pts	Qualification or relegation
1	Shakhtar Donetsk (C)	28	21	2	5	62	23	+39	65	Qualification for the Champions League group stage
2	Dnipro Dnipropetrovsk	28	18	5	5	56	28	+28	59	Qualification for the Champions League third qualifying round (Note: On 18 June 2014, UEFA published the seeding ranking for the upcoming 2014-15 UEFA Champions League season, where FC Dnipro Dnipropetrovsk were pending approval of the UEFA Club Financial Control Body (CFCB) on 19 June 2014 to participate in the competition. The main issue that might have impeded Dnipro to participate in the continental competitions was the "Boateng case". The conflict arose during the 2012-13 season when Derek Boateng unsuccessfully tried to leave the club due to breach of contract and was forced to file a case against the club through the Court of Arbitration for Sport (CAS) in Lausanne. The end result was that Dnipro did play in the 2014-15 Champions League 3rd qualifying round (and, subsequently, the Europa League).)
3	Metalist Kharkiv	28	16	9	3	54	29	+25	57	Qualification for the Europa League play-off round
4	Dynamo Kyiv	28	16	5	7	55	33	+22	53	Qualification for the Europa League group stage (Note: FC Dynamo Kyiv qualified for the Group Stage of the 2014-15 Europa League as the 2013-14 Ukrainian Cup winner.)
5	Chornomorets Odesa	28	12	10	6	30	22	+8	46	Qualification for the Europa League third qualifying round
6	Metalurh Donetsk	28	12	7	9	45	42	+3	43	
7	Zorya Luhansk	28	11	9	8	35	30	+5	42	Qualification for the Europa League second qualifying round
8	Vorskla Poltava	28	10	10	8	36	38	−2	40	
9	Sevastopol (D)	28	10	5	13	32	43	−11	35	Club withdrew after season (Note: With the start of the Russo-Ukrainian war and annexation of Crimea by Russia, FC Sevastopol and SC Tavriya Simferopol were forced to withdraw. Later, new clubs were created in their place with similar names to participate in the Russian competitions next season.)
10	Illichivets Mariupol	28	10	4	14	27	33	−6	34	
11	Karpaty Lviv	28	7	11	10	33	39	−6	32	
12	Hoverla Uzhhorod	28	7	5	16	26	39	−13	26	
13	Volyn Lutsk	28	7	6	15	25	51	−26	24 (Note: On 20 May 2014, FC Volyn Lutsk were deducted three points by the FFU for breach of financial rules.)	
14	Metalurh Zaporizhzhia	28	2	6	20	19	54	−35	12	
15	Tavriya Simferopol (D)	28	2	4	22	15	46	−31	10	Club withdrew after season
16	Arsenal Kyiv (D)	0	0	0	0	0	0	0	0	Club officially expelled from the league (Note: On 29 October 2013, the general director of FC Arsenal Kyiv Viktor Holovko announced that the club was filing for bankruptcy and withdrawing from competitions as it was unable to find any sponsors. The General Assembly of the Ukrainian Premier League was unable to reach a quorum and hence no decision was made on the expulsion of the club from the UPL. (18 December 2013) On 12 February 2014 Arsenal Kyiv was officially expelled from the league and all the club's results were annulled. Arsenal played 13 games with record 3 wins, 1 draw and 9 losses with 10 goals scored and 28 goals scored against and also one technical defeat was recorded against them.)

Source: uafootball.net.ua
Rules for classification: 1st points; 2nd goal difference; 3rd goals scored; 4th head-to-head points; 5th head-to-head goal difference; 6th head-to-head goals scored; 7th fair play rating
(C) Champions; (D) Disqualified

== Results ==
The following table displays match results between each team in the competition.

Home \ Away	ARK	CHO	DNI	DYK	HOV	ILL	KAR	MET	MDO	MZA	SEV	SHA	TAV	VOL	VOR	ZOR
Arsenal Kyiv	—	—	—	0–2	—	1–2	—	1–2	—	—	3–1	—	—	2–1	1–1	—
Chornomorets Odesa	1–0	—	1–0	1–1	2–1	1–0	0–0 (Note: For Round 30 the Football Federation of Ukraine decided of not conducting matches in Donetsk, Kharkiv, Luhansk and Odesa oblasts due to continual unrest in the country. The match between Chornomorets Odesa and Karpaty Lviv took place in Kyiv at the Obolon Arena. The match between Shakhtar Donetsk and Volyn Lutsk took place in Cherkasy at the Central Stadium. The match between Metalist Kharkiv and Vorskla Poltava took place in Kyiv at the Lobanovsky Dynamo Stadium.)	1–1	1–0	3–0	2–0	0–1	0–0	0–0	1–1	3–1
Dnipro	3–0	2–0	—	2–0	1–0	3–1	1–4	2–2 (Note: The Round 12 match between Dnipro and Metalist on 6 October 2013 was suspended at a halftime with the score 2–1 due to lighting issues at Dnipro-Arena. The Ukrainian Premier League decided in an executive meeting on 7 October 2013 that the match was to be continued from the start of the second half on 4 December 2013.)	3–1	1–0	3–0	3–1	1–0	5–1	2–2	1–3
Dynamo Kyiv	—	1–2	1–1	—	3–0	1–0	1–0	4–2	9–1	4–0	2–0	0–2	2–0	1–1	2–1	3–1
Hoverla Uzhhorod	2–0	1–1	0–2	1–2	—	1–2	1–0	0–2	0–0	1–1	1–2	0–2	2–1	6–0	1–2	0–0
Illichivets Mariupol	—	3–1	0–2	0–2 (Note: The Football Federation of Ukraine decided that all Round 29 matches were played with no spectators attending due to continual unrest in the country. Also a decision was made by the FFU of not conducting matches in Donetsk, Kharkiv, Luhansk and Odesa oblasts. The match between Illichivets Mariupol and Dynamo Kyiv took place in Kyiv at the NSC Olimpiysky. The match between Zorya Luhansk and Shakhtar Donetsk took place in Cherkasy at the Central Stadium. The match between Metalurh Donetsk and Metalurh Zaporizhzhia took place in Dnipropetrovsk at the Meteor Stadium.)	0–1	—	1–1	1–1	3–0	3–1	0–0	1–3	1–2	1–0	1–2	1–0
Karpaty Lviv	0–2	1–1	0–4	2–2	1–0	0–1	—	2–4	2–2	2–2	2–0	3–2	2–1	0–1	0–2	0–0
Metalist Kharkiv	—	0–0	2–1	3–0	1–1	2–0	2–1	—	1–0	3–2	3–1	2–4	1–0	4–0	1–0	1–1
Metalurh Donetsk	2–0	3–2	1–1	2–1	4–2	1–1	1–1	3–0	—	2–0	3–0	2–2	2–1	1–3	4–1	2–0
Metalurh Zaporizhzhia	—	0–1	2–3	1–2	0–1	0–1	1–3	0–3	0–0	—	2–2	0–3	1–0	3–0	0–1	1–1
Sevastopol	—	1–1	1–1	1–2	3–0 (Note: Administration of Hoverla Uzhhorod informed the Ukrainian Premier League that they would not appear for their Round 30 fixture against FC Sevastopol. Control Disciplinary Committee of the Football Federation of Ukraine award a 3–0 technical victory to Sevastopol.)	0–1	1–0	0–2 (Note: The Round 20 match between Sevastopol–Metalist was postponed to a later date due to the annexation of Crimea by the Russian Federation. The Russian-appointed Sevastopol city's authorities prohibited for the game to take place and the match was scheduled to take place in Kyiv at the Lobanovsky Dynamo Stadium on May 7, 2014.)	4–2	5–0	—	1–3	1–0	2–1	1–0	0–2
Shakhtar Donetsk	7–0	1–0	0–2	3–1	2–0	3–1	3–0	1–1	2–1	2–0	4–0	—	2–1	2–0	3–0	4–0
Tavriya Simferopol	3–0 (Note: Administration of Arsenal Kyiv informed that the club would not travel to their Round 14 match against Tavria Simferopol indicating that the football club Arsenal Kyiv may cease operations. The Ukrainian Football Federation Control Disciplinary Committee originally awarded a technical victory to Tavriya. (21 October 2013) After Arsenal Kyiv was expelled, the result was annulled. (12 February 2014))	1–2	0–2	1–2 (Note: The Round 19 match between Tavria–Dynamo was moved to Kyiv at the NSC Olimpiysky as a preventative measure against possible violence in Crimea due to the annexation of Crimea by the Russian Federation.)	1–3	0–3	0–1	0–3	0–1	3–1	0–2	0–4	—	2–2	0–1	0–2
Volyn Lutsk	—	1–2	1–3	1–4	0–1	1–0	1–1	1–4	1–0	2–0	1–2	2–0	1–0	—	0–0	0–2
Vorskla Poltava	—	0–1	1–4	2–2	3–1	1–0	2–2	1–1	1–2	2–1	2–2	1–0	1–1	3–3	—	1–1
Zorya Luhansk	4–0	1–0	3–0	2–0	1–0	3–0	2–2	2–2	0–4	0–0	3–0	1–3	0–0	2–0	1–2	—

Source: uafootball.net.ua
Legend: Blue = home team win; Yellow = draw; Red = away team win.

=== Positions by round ===
The following table represents the teams' position after each round in the competition. The competition resumes with the spring stage with Round 21 due to the postponement of the competition due to the civil unrest in the country after the riots in Kyiv and continuing on with the annexation of Crimea by the Russian Federation. Originally scheduled Round 19 was played 15–17 April after Round 25 and Round 20 was played 23–24 April after Round 26.

Team ╲ Round	1	2	3	4	5	6	7	8	9	10	11	12	13	14	15	16	17	18	19	20	21	22	23	24	25	26	27	28	29	30
Shakhtar Donetsk	2	2	1	1	1	1	2	2	4	4	3	2	2	2	2	1	1	1	1	1	1	1	1	1	1	1	1	1	1	1
Dnipro	1	1	5	3	3	3	3	3	2	2	2	3	3	3	3	4	4	4	3	3	2	2	2	2	2	2	2	2	2	2
Metalist Kharkiv	5	3	2	2	2	2	1	1	1	1	1	1	1	1	1	2	3	2	4	4	4	5	4	4	4	4	3	3	3	3
FC Dynamo Kyiv	9	6	4	5	8	6	5	6	6	5	5	5	5	5	5	5	5	3	2	2	3	3	3	3	3	3	4	4	4	4
Chornomorets Odesa	8	9	13	8	6	5	4	4	3	3	4	4	4	4	4	3	2	5	5	5	5	4	5	5	5	5	5	5	5	5
Metalurh Donetsk	11	10	8	10	7	9	8	9	7	7	8	10	8	8	9	8	8	8	8	6	7	8	8	6	7	8	7	7	6	6
Zorya Luhansk	3	5	3	4	4	7	9	7	9	10	7	7	7	7	7	7	7	7	7	8	9	7	7	8	6	6	6	6	7	7
Vorskla Poltava	4	4	7	7	5	4	6	5	5	6	6	6	6	6	6	6	6	6	6	7	6	6	6	7	8	7	8	8	8	8
Sevastopol	7	12	14	12	10	11	12	10	11	9	11	11	12	11	8	10	11	11	11	11	12	11	12	11	12	10	10	11	9	9
Illichivets Mariupol	6	8	12	13	13	8	7	8	8	8	9	9	9	9	11	9	9	12	12	12	11	12	10	9	9	9	9	10	11	10
Karpaty Lviv	13	13	15	15	15	14	10	12	10	12	10	8	10	10	10	11	10	10	10	10	10	10	11	12	11	11	11	10	10	11
Hoverla Uzhhorod	14	14	10	9	11	13	14	14	15	13	13	13	11	12	13	13	13	13	13	13	13	13	13	13	13	13	13	13	13	12
Volyn Lutsk	10	7	9	14	14	12	13	11	12	11	12	12	13	13	12	12	12	9	9	9	8	9	9	10	10	12	12	12	12	13
Metalurh Zaporizhzhia	12	11	6	6	9	10	11	13	14	15	15	15	15	15	15	15	15	14	14	15	14	14	14	14	14	14	14	14	14	14
Tavriya Simferopol	15	15	16	16	16	16	16	16	16	16	16	16	16	16	16	16	16	15	15	14	15	15	15	15	15	15	15	15	15	15
Arsenal Kyiv	16	16	11	11	12	15	15	15	13	14	14	14	14	14	14	14	14	16	–	–	–	–	–	–	–	–	–	–	–	–

Source: kicker.de (in German)

== Season statistics ==
=== Top goalscorers ===
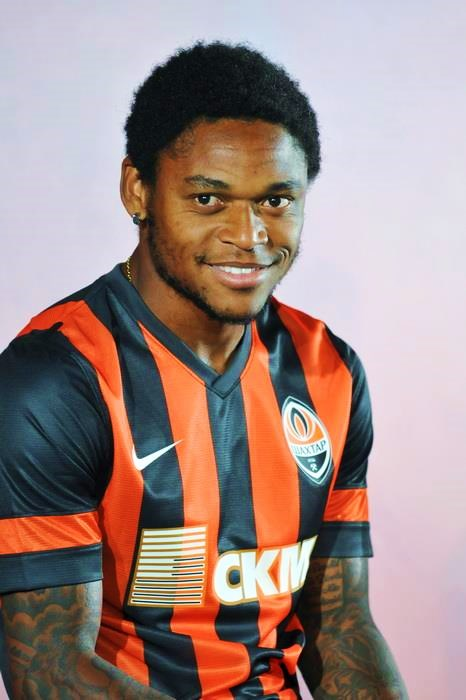
Adriano in 2013

The top ten goalscorers were as follows:

Rank	Scorer	Goals (Pen.)	Team
1	(Brazil) Luiz Adriano	20 (1)	Shakhtar Donetsk
2	(Brazil) Junior Moraes	19 (4)	Metalurh Donetsk
3	(Ukraine) Marko Devich^{(10)}	15	Metalist Kharkiv
4	(Brazil) Matheus	13	Dnipro Dnipropetrovsk
4	(Democratic Republic of the Congo) Dieumerci Mbokani	13	Dynamo Kyiv
4	(Ukraine) Yevhen Seleznyov	13 (1)	Dnipro Dnipropetrovsk
7	(Ivory Coast) Yannick Boli	12 (1)	Zorya Luhansk
7	(Ukraine) Andriy Yarmolenko	12 (2)	Dynamo Kyiv
9	(Ukraine) Oleksandr Hladkyi	10	Karpaty Lviv
9	(Ukraine) Oleksiy Antonov	10 (1)	Chornomorets Odesa

Notes:

- ^(10) Russian Premier League club Rubin Kazan signed Marko Devich during the winter break.

=== Hat-tricks ===
Player	For	Against	Result	Date
(Ukraine) Maksym Feshchuk	Tavriya Simferopol	Metalurh Zaporizhzhia	3–1	30 August 2013
(Ukraine) Marko Devich	Metalist Kharkiv	Metalurh Zaporizhzhia	3–2	29 September 2013
(Argentina) Facundo Ferreyra	Shakhtar Donetsk	Arsenal Kyiv	7–0	5 October 2013
(Brazil) Júnior Moraes	Metalurh Donetsk	Vorskla Poltava	4–1	29 November 2013
(Brazil) Matheus*	Dnipro Dnipropetrovsk	Volyn Lutsk	5–1	15 April 2014
(Brazil) Cleiton Xavier	Metalist Kharkiv	Karpaty Lviv	4–2	11 May 2014

Notes:

- (*) Asterisk identifies players who scored four goals (poker).

== Awards ==
=== Monthly awards ===
Month	UA-Football Player of the Month			
Month	Player	Nat	Club	Link
July	Marko Devich	UKR	Metalist Kharkiv	3G
August	Roman Zozulya	UKR	Dnipro Dnipropetrovsk	2G 1A
September	Marko Devich	UKR	Metalist Kharkiv	5G
October	Yevhen Konoplyanka	UKR	Dnipro Dnipropetrovsk	1G
November	Andriy Yarmolenko	UKR	Dynamo Kyiv	2G
March	Matheus	BRA	Dnipro Dnipropetrovsk	3G 1A
April	Júnior Moraes	BRA	Metalurh Donetsk	5G
May	Yevhen Konoplyanka	UKR	Dnipro Dnipropetrovsk	1G 1A

=== Season awards ===
The laureates of the 2013–14 UPL season were:

- Best player: (Ukraine) Yevhen Konoplyanka (Dnipro Dnipropetrovsk)
- Best coach: (Romania) Mircea Lucescu (Shakhtar Donetsk)
- Best goalkeeper: (Ukraine) Andriy Pyatov (Shakhtar Donetsk)
- Best arbiter: (Ukraine) Yuriy Mozharovsky (Lviv)
- Best young player: (Ukraine) Serhiy Bolbat (Metalurh Donetsk)
- Best goalscorer: (Brazil) Luiz Adriano (Shakhtar Donetsk)

== See also ==
- 2013–14 Ukrainian First League
- 2013–14 Ukrainian Premier League Reserves and Under 19
- 2013–14 Ukrainian Second League
- 2013–14 Ukrainian Cup
- 2013–14 UEFA Europa League
- 2013–14 UEFA Champions League
