= 2012–13 Ukrainian Premier League =

22nd season of top-tier football league in Vyshcha Liha

Ukrainian Premier League
- Season: 2012–13
- Champions: Shakhtar Donetsk; 8th title
- Relegated: None relegated
- Champions League: Shakhtar Donetsk; Metalist Kharkiv
- Europa League: Dynamo Kyiv; Dnipro Dnipropetrovsk; Metalurh Donetsk; Chornomorets Odesa
- Matches: 239
- Goals: 621 (2.6 per match)
- Top goalscorer: 25 goals – Mkhitaryan (Shakhtar)
- Biggest home win: Dnipro 7–0 Illichivets (Round 30)
- Biggest away win: Metalurh Z. 0–5 Dynamo (Round 15); Zorya 0–5 Dynamo (Round 25)
- Highest scoring: 8 – Metalurh Donetsk 6–2 Kryvbas (Round 11)
- Longest winning run: 15 – Shakhtar (Round 1–15)
- Longest unbeaten run: 15 – Shakhtar (Round 1–15); Metalist (Round 16–30)
- Longest winless run: 24 – Metalurh Z. (Round 1–24)
- Longest losing run: 7 – Hoverla (Round 1–7)
- Highest attendance: 66,837 Dynamo–Shakhtar (Round 23)
- Lowest attendance: 0 (Note: Match was played in an empty stadium due to sanctions (see results)) Karpaty–Dnipro (Round 28)
- Average attendance: 12,628

The 2012–13 Ukrainian Premier League season was the 22nd since its establishment in 1991 and fifth since its reorganisation.

A total of sixteen teams participated in the league, the best 14 sides of the 2011–12 season and two promoted clubs from the 2011–12 Ukrainian First League. The season commenced on July 13, 2012 when Karpaty Lviv visited Lutsk and played a 1–1 draw against Volyn Lutsk. The competition had a winter break that began on 2 December and resumed on 1 March 2013 when Volyn Lutsk visited Donetsk and played against Shakhtar Donetsk. The ending date of the competition was 26 May 2013.

Henrikh Mkhitaryan from Shakhtar Donetsk set a new Ukraine Premier League record for number of goals scored in one season. It is the second season in the league when no clubs were relegated.

== Teams ==
=== Promoted ===
- FC Hoverla-Zakarpattia Uzhhorod, champion of the 2011–12 Ukrainian First League – (returning after absence of 2 seasons)
- FC Metalurh Zaporizhzhia, runner-up of the 2011–12 Ukrainian First League – (returning after absence of a season)

=== Renamed teams ===
Prior to the start of the season Hoverla-Zakarpattia Uzhhorod was renamed to Hoverla Uzhhorod.

=== Location map ===
Location of teams in 2012–13 Ukrainian Premier League
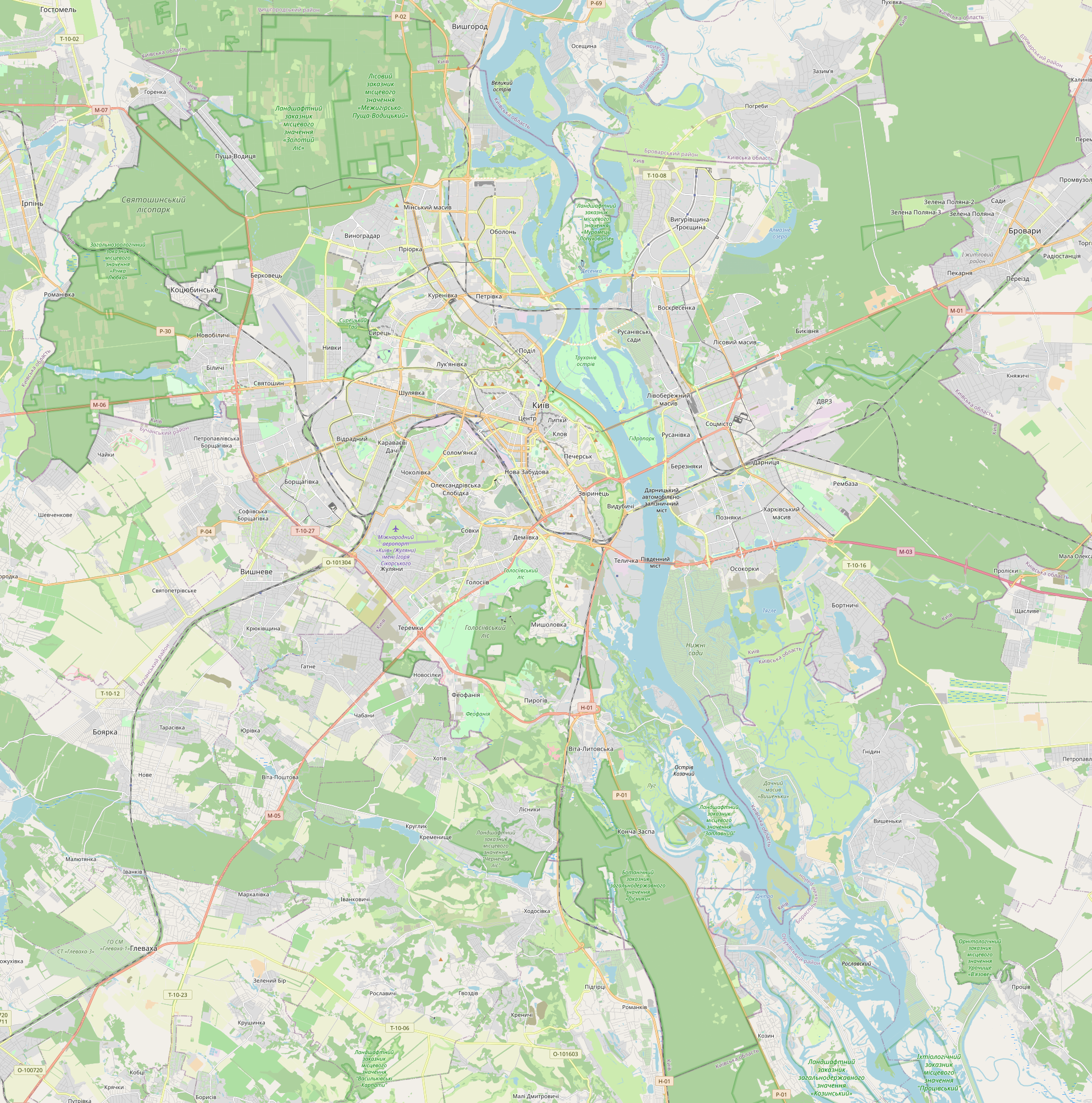
Kyiv city home venues of teams in the League

=== Stadiums ===
The following stadiums were used during the season:

Rank	Stadium	Club	Capacity	Highest Attendance		Notes
1	NSC Olimpiyskiy	Dynamo Kyiv	70,050	66,837	Round 23 (Shakhtar)	
2	Donbas Arena	Shakhtar Donetsk	52,518	53,423	Round 8 (Dynamo)	
3	OSC Metalist	Metalist Kharkiv	40,003	40,003	Round 11 (Shakhtar)	
4	Arena Lviv	Karpaty Lviv	34,915			
4	Arena Lviv	Hoverla Uzhhorod	34,915	5,100	Round 2 (Shakhtar)	Used as home ground in Round 2 since main stadium was under repair.
5	Chornomorets Stadium	Chornomorets Odesa	34,164	34,164	Round 22 (Dynamo)	
6	Dnipro Arena	Dnipro Dnipropetrovsk	31,003	30,530	Round 25 (Shakhtar)	
7	Metalurh Stadium	Kryvbas Kryvyi Rih	29,783	8,900	Round 22 (Metalist)	
8	Ukraina Stadium	Karpaty Lviv	28,051	25,850	Round 24 (Dynamo)	
9	Vorskla Stadium	Vorskla Poltava	24,750	10,500	Round 6 (Dynamo)	
10	Avanhard Stadium	Zorya Luhansk	22,288	20,200	Round 25 (Dynamo)	
11	RSC Lokomotiv	Tavriya Simferopol	19,978	14,100	Round 13 (Shakhtar)	
11	RSC Lokomotiv	Arsenal Kyiv	19,978	2,500	Round 22 (Tavriya)	Used as home ground in Round 22
12	Dynamo Stadium	Arsenal Kyiv	16,873	11,617	Round 2 (Dynamo)	
13	Illichivets Stadium	Illichivets Mariupol	12,680	11,200	Round 13 (Dynamo)	
14	Avanhard Stadium	Volyn Lutsk	12,080	10,000	Round 4 (Shakhtar)	
15	Avanhard Stadium	Hoverla Uzhhorod	12,000	7,000	Round 18 (Dynamo)	Stadium was under repair in 2012. Returned for Round 4.
16	Slavutych-Arena	Metalurh Zaporizhzhia	11,983	11,500	Round 2 (Dnipro)	
17	Metalurh Stadium	Metalurh Donetsk	5,094	4,500	Round 15 (Shakhtar)	

=== Personnel and sponsorship ===
Team	Home city	Head coach	Captain	Kit manufacturer	Shirt sponsor
Arsenal Kyiv	Kyiv	(Ukraine) Yuriy Bakalov	(Ukraine) Volodymyr Arzhanov	Nike	
Chornomorets Odesa	Odesa	(Ukraine) Roman Hryhorchuk	(Ukraine) Dmytro Bezotosnyi	Nike	Imexbank
Dnipro Dnipropetrovsk	Dnipropetrovsk	(Spain) Juande Ramos	(Ukraine) Ruslan Rotan	Nike	Biola
Dynamo Kyiv	Kyiv	(Ukraine) Oleh Blokhin	(Ukraine) Oleksandr Shovkovskyi	adidas	PrivatBank
Hoverla Uzhhorod	Uzhhorod	(Ukraine) Oleksandr Sevidov	(Ukraine) Oleksandr Nad'	adidas	—
Illichivets Mariupol	Mariupol	(Ukraine) Mykola Pavlov	(Ukraine) Adrian Pukanych	Nike	—
Karpaty Lviv	Lviv	(Ukraine) Yuriy Dyachuk-Stavytskyi	(Ukraine) Ihor Khudobyak	Joma	Favbet
Kryvbas Kryvyi Rih	Kryvyi Rih	(Ukraine) Oleh Taran	(Ukraine) Vitaliy Lysytskyi	Nike	—
Metalist Kharkiv	Kharkiv	(Ukraine) Myron Markevych	(Argentina) José Sosa	adidas	VETEK
Metalurh Donetsk	Donetsk	(Ukraine) Yuriy Maksymov	(Ukraine) Vyacheslav Checher	Umbro	ISD
Metalurh Zaporizhzhia	Zaporizhzhia	(Ukraine) Serhiy Zaytsev	(Ukraine) Serhiy Rudyka	Nike	Zaporizhstal
Shakhtar Donetsk	Donetsk	(Romania) Mircea Lucescu	(Croatia) Darijo Srna	Nike	SCM
Tavriya Simferopol	Simferopol	(Ukraine) Oleh Luzhnyi	(Ukraine) Volodymyr Yezerskiy	Puma	Titan
Volyn Lutsk	Lutsk	(Ukraine) Vitaliy Kvartsyanyi	(Ukraine) Serhiy Siminin	adidas	—
Vorskla Poltava	Poltava	(Ukraine) Serhiy Svystun	(Ukraine) Serhiy Dolhanskyi	adidas	Ferrexpo
Zorya Luhansk	Luhansk	(Ukraine) Yuriy Vernydub	(Ukraine) Mykyta Kamenyuka	Nike	Holsten

=== Managerial changes ===
Team	Outgoing head coach	Manner of departure	Date of vacancy	Table	Incoming head coach	Date of appointment
Illichivets Mariupol	(Ukraine) Ihor Leonov (interim)	Replaced	May 29	Pre-season	(Ukraine) Mykola Pavlov	May 29
Metalurh Zaporizhzhia	(Ukraine) Serhiy Zaytsev (interim)	End as interim	May 31	Pre-season	(Ukraine) Anatoliy Buznyk (interim)	May 31
Tavriya Simferopol	(Ukraine) Semen Altman	Sacked	June 1	Pre-season	(Ukraine) Oleh Luzhnyi	June 6
Vorskla Poltava	(Ukraine) Mykola Pavlov	Signed by Illichivets	May 29	Pre-season	(Ukraine) Vadym Yevtushenko	June 7
Karpaty Lviv	(Ukraine) Yuriy Dyachuk-Stavytskyi (interim)	End as interim	June 7	Pre-season	(Russia) Pavel Kucherov (interim)	June 7
Kryvbas Kryvyi Rih	(Ukraine) Yuriy Maksymov	Replaced	June 10	Pre-season	(Ukraine) Vitaliy Kvartsyanyi	June 10
Kryvbas Kryvyi Rih	(Ukraine) Vitaliy Kvartsyanyi	Resigned	July 11	Pre-season	(Ukraine) Oleh Taran(interim)	July 12
Metalurh Zaporizhzhia	(Ukraine) Anatoliy Buznyk	Resigned	July 13	Pre-season	(Ukraine) Ihor Luchkevych(interim)	July 14
Metalurh Zaporizhzhia	(Ukraine) Ihor Luchkevych (interim)	End as interim	July 24	15th	(Ukraine) Serhiy Kovalets	July 24
Karpaty Lviv	(Russia) Pavel Kucherov (interim)	End as interim	July 29	12th	(Bulgaria) Nikolay Kostov	July 29
Vorskla Poltava	(Ukraine) Vadym Yevtushenko	Resigned	August 15	12th	(Ukraine) Serhiy Svystun (interim)	August 18
Metalurh Donetsk	(Ukraine) Volodymyr Pyatenko	Resigned	August 23	14th	(Ukraine) Yuriy Maksymov	August 23
Metalurh Zaporizhzhia	(Ukraine) Serhiy Kovalets	Sacked	August 31	16th	(Ukraine) Anatoliy Zayaev (interim)	August 31
Metalurh Zaporizhzhia	(Ukraine) Anatoliy Zayaev (interim)	End as interim	September 6	16th	(Ukraine) Vitaliy Kvartsyanyi	September 6
Dynamo Kyiv	(Russia) Yuri Syomin	Sacked	September 24	3rd	(Ukraine) Oleh Blokhin	September 25
Dynamo Kyiv	(Ukraine) Oleh Blokhin	Illness	October 6	2nd	(Ukraine) Oleksiy Mykhaylychenko (temporary)	October 6
Dynamo Kyiv	(Ukraine) Oleksiy Mykhaylychenko	End as interim	November 6	3rd	(Ukraine) Oleh Blokhin	November 6
Metalurh Zaporizhzhia	(Ukraine) Vitaliy Kvartsyanyi	Contract terminated	December 31	16th	(Ukraine) Serhiy Zaytsev	January 1
Arsenal Kyiv	(Belarus) Leonid Kuchuk	Contract terminated	January 1	8th	(Ukraine) Yuriy Bakalov	January 1
Volyn Lutsk	(Ukraine) Anatoliy Demyanenko	Resigned	April 23	13th	(Ukraine) Anatoliy Piskovets (caretaker)	April 23
Karpaty Lviv	(Bulgaria) Nikolay Kostov	Resigns	May 4	13th	(Ukraine) Yuriy Dyachuk-Stavytskyi (interim)	May 7
Volyn Lutsk	(Ukraine) Anatoliy Piskovets (interim)	End as interim	May 7	14th	(Ukraine) Vitaliy Kvartsyanyi (interim)	May 7
Kryvbas Kryvyi Rih	(Ukraine) Oleh Taran	Resigned	May 19	6th	Did not play (Round 30)	

== Qualification to European competitions for 2013–14 ==
- Since Ukraine finished in eighth place of the UEFA country ranking after the 2011–12 season, the league will have the same number of qualifiers for 2013–14 UEFA Europa League. The Ukrainian Cup winner qualifies for the play-off round.

=== Qualified Teams ===
- After the 21st Round, Shakhtar Donetsk qualified for European football for the 2013–14 season.
- During the 24th Round, Shakhtar Donetsk qualified for the 2012–13 UEFA Champions League.
- During the 25th Round, Metalist Kharkiv and Dynamo Kyiv qualified for European football for the 2013–14 season.
- During the 26th Round, Shakhtar Donetsk became champions and qualified for the 2012–13 UEFA Champions League group stage after a 1–1 draw against Metalist Kharkiv. (C)
- During the 27th Round, Dnipro Dnipropetrovsk qualified for European football for the 2013–14 season.
- After the Ukrainian Cup Semi Final, Chornomorets Odesa qualified for the 2013–14 UEFA Europa League as they will play in the 2012–13 Ukrainian Cup final against the champions of Ukraine, Shakhtar Donetsk, who have already qualified for the UEFA Champions League.
- During the 28th Round, after Metalist Kharkiv won their fixture against Zorya Luhansk, Dnipro Dnipropetrovsk qualified for the 2013–14 UEFA Europa League.
- After the 29th Round Metalist Kharkiv qualified for the 2012–13 UEFA Champions League and will enter into the third qualifying round.
- After the 29th Round Dynamo Kyiv qualified for the 2013–14 UEFA Europa League and will enter into the playoff round.
- After the 29th Round Metalurh Donetsk qualified for the 2013–14 UEFA Europa League.
- After Chornomorets Odesa were defeated in the Ukrainian Cup Final, Dnipro Dnipropetrovsk will enter into the playoff round, Metalurh Donetsk will enter in the 3rd qualifying round, Chornomorets Odesa will enter in the 2nd qualifying round of the 2013–14 UEFA Europa League.

== League table ==
Pos	Team	Pld	W	D	L	GF	GA	GD	Pts	Qualification or relegation
1	Shakhtar Donetsk (C)	30	25	4	1	82	18	+64	79	Qualification for the Champions League group stage
2	Metalist Kharkiv	30	20	6	4	59	25	+34	66	Qualification for the Champions League third qualifying round
3	Dynamo Kyiv	30	20	2	8	55	23	+32	62	Qualification for the Europa League play-off round
4	Dnipro Dnipropetrovsk	30	16	8	6	54	27	+27	56	Qualification for the Europa League play-off round
5	Metalurh Donetsk	30	14	7	9	45	35	+10	49	Qualification for the Europa League third qualifying round
6	Chornomorets Odesa	30	12	7	11	32	36	−4	43	Qualification for the Europa League second qualifying round
7	Kryvbas Kryvyi Rih (D)	30	12	7	11	36	41	−5	43	Club expelled after season (Note: Kryvbas Kryvyi Rih were denied a license for the 2013–14 season due to financial problems and were expelled.)
8	Arsenal Kyiv	30	10	9	11	34	41	−7	39	
9	Illichivets Mariupol	30	10	8	12	30	32	−2	38	
10	Zorya Luhansk	30	10	7	13	32	43	−11	37	
11	Tavriya Simferopol	30	10	5	15	27	46	−19	32 (Note: Tavria Simferopol were deducted 3 points for non compliance with contractual agreements with player agents (regarding Makhach Gadzhiyev).)	
12	Vorskla Poltava	30	8	7	15	31	36	−5	31	
13	Volyn Lutsk	30	7	8	15	26	45	−19	29	
14	Karpaty Lviv	30	7	6	17	37	52	−15	27	
15	Hoverla Uzhhorod	30	5	7	18	29	57	−28	22	
16	Metalurh Zaporizhya	30	1	8	21	12	64	−52	11	

Source: uafootball.net.ua
Rules for classification: 1st points; 2nd goal difference; 3rd goals scored; 4th head-to-head points; 5th head-to-head goal difference; 6th head-to-head goals scored; 7th fair play; 8th draw (Regulation, p.52-53).
(C) Champions; (D) Disqualified

== Results ==
The following table displays match results between each team in the competition.

Home \ Away	ARK	CHO	DNI	DYK	HOV	ILL	KAR	KRY	MET	MDO	MZA	SHA	TAV	VOL	VOR	ZOR
Arsenal Kyiv	—	0–1	1–1	0–1	2–0	2–1	4–1	1–1	1–2	0–2	3–0	2–0	1–1	1–1	2–1	0–1
Chornomorets Odesa	0–0	—	1–2	0–2	3–2	1–1	1–1	2–0	1–1	3–0	1–1	1–5	1–0	0–2	1–0	2–1
Dnipro	3–0	1–0	—	2–1	4–1	7–0	2–0	1–2	2–0	2–0	3–0	1–1	3–1	2–1	1–2	1–1
Dynamo Kyiv	4–0	2–0	2–0	—	3–1	1–0	3–1	1–1	1–3	1–0	3–0	1–2	2–0	4–1	1–0	1–0
Hoverla Uzhhorod	1–3	1–1	0–1	2–4	—	1–1	2–1	1–1	0–3	2–1	2–0	1–3	2–1	1–1	1–1	0–1
Illichivets Mariupol	2–1	2–1	0–0	0–0	2–0	—	2–0	0–1	0–2	0–1	1–0	1–1	0–1	0–0	1–0	1–2
Karpaty Lviv	1–1	1–2	2–4 (Note: The Round 28 match was played in an empty stadium as sanctions for display of inappropriate banners in Karpaty's previous home game against Zorya Luhansk.)	0–1	1–1	1–5	—	6–0	1–1	0–1	2–1	1–2	2–0	2–0	2–0	2–0
Kryvbas Kryvyi Rih	1–1	1–0	0–0	0–1	3–0	1–2	3–2	—	1–1	1–1	5–0	0–2	2–0	1–0	3–2	3–0
Metalist Kharkiv	0–1	3–1	2–1	2–0	1–0	2–0	2–1	3–1	—	3–2	1–1	0–2	5–0	1–0	4–0	2–0
Metalurh Donetsk	5–0	2–0	0–0	1–0	2–1	0–0	4–0	6–2	2–2	—	2–0	0–4	1–1	2–0	0–0	1–2
Metalurh Zaporizhzhia	0–0	0–1	0–4	0–5	1–1	0–3	1–1	2–0	1–3	1–2	—	3–3	0–1	0–3	0–4	0–0
Shakhtar Donetsk	6–0	3–0	2–1	3–1	5–1	2–1	3–0	1–0	1–1	4–0	2–0	—	5–0	4–0	4–1	3–0
Tavriya Simferopol	1–1	1–3	1–2	3–2	0–2	1–0	0–2	2–0	0–1	4–3	1–0	0–1	—	3–0	0–0	1–0
Volyn Lutsk	1–3	0–2	1–1	0–2	2–1	0–2	1–1	3–0 (Note: Kryvbas Kryvyi Rih did not travel to Luts'k for their Round 30 fixture against Volyn Lutsk due to their financial situation. The Disciplinary Committee of the Football Federation of Ukraine award a 3–0 technical victory to Volyn Lutsk.)	2–1	1–1	0–0	0–4	0–1	—	1–0	2–2
Vorskla Poltava	1–0	0–1	2–2	1–0	3–0	1–0	3–1	0–1	1–4	0–1	5–0	0–1	2–2	0–1	—	0–0
Zorya Luhansk	1–3	1–1	3–0 (Note: The FFU awards a 3–0 technical victory to Zorya Luhansk in their Round 12 match against Dnipro Dnipropetrovsk after Dnipro field eight foreign players during the match. The original match ended in a 3–2 victory for Zorya.)	0–5	2–1	2–2	2–1	0–1	1–3	1–2	2–0	0–3	3–0	3–1	1–1	—

Source: uafootball.net.ua
Legend: Blue = home team win; Yellow = draw; Red = away team win.

=== Round by round ===
The following table represents the teams position after each round in the competition.

Team ╲ Round	1	2	3	4	5	6	7	8	9	10	11	12	13	14	15	16	17	18	19	20	21	22	23	24	25	26	27	28	29	30
Shakhtar Donetsk	1	1	1	1	1	1	1	1	1	1	1	1	1	1	1	1	1	1	1	1	1	1	1	1	1	1	1	1	1	1
Metalist Kharkiv	3	4	4	5	6	4	4	4	4	4	4	4	4	4	4	4	4	4	3	3	2	3	2	2	2	3	2	2	2	2
Dynamo Kyiv	6	5	3	2	2	2	2	3	3	2	3	3	3	3	2	3	3	3	4	4	3	2	3	3	3	2	3	3	3	3
Dnipro	2	2	2	3	3	3	3	2	2	3	2	2	2	2	3	2	2	2	2	2	4	4	4	4	4	4	4	4	4	4
Metalurh Donetsk	11	11	15	14	13	14	9	8	5	6	6	6	6	8	10	7	6	6	6	6	9	7	6	6	5	5	5	5	5	5
Chornomorets Odesa	5	9	10	9	7	11	14	11	12	13	13	13	10	6	5	5	5	5	5	5	5	5	5	5	6	6	6	6	7	6
Kryvbas Kryvyi Rih	7	6	7	8	5	6	7	10	11	9	11	12	12	13	13	8	10	12	12	9	8	9	7	7	8	8	8	7	6	7
Arsenal Kyiv	16	16	12	11	8	7	6	5	6	5	5	5	5	7	8	6	8	8	10	12	13	12	11	11	11	10	9	9	9	8
Illichivets Mariupol	14	8	8	7	10	12	8	6	7	8	7	8	7	10	9	11	9	9	7	7	6	6	8	8	7	7	7	8	8	9
Tavriya Simferopol	13	14	11	13	11	10	10	13	9	7	8	11	13	12	12	13	13	11	13	10	10	10	10	10	9	9	10	10	10	11
Zorya Luhansk	4	3	6	4	4	5	5	7	10	11	10	7	8	11	11	12	12	10	8	8	7	8	9	9	10	11	11	11	11	10
Vorskla Poltava	12	12	9	12	14	13	13	12	13	12	12	10	11	9	6	9	11	13	14	14	14	14	12	12	12	13	12	12	12	12
Volyn Lutsk	8	7	5	6	9	9	11	9	8	10	9	9	9	5	7	10	7	7	9	11	12	11	13	13	13	14	14	14	14	13
Karpaty Lviv	9	10	13	10	12	8	12	14	14	14	14	14	14	14	14	14	14	14	11	13	11	13	14	14	14	12	13	13	13	14
Hoverla Uzhhorod	10	13	16	16	16	16	16	15	15	15	15	15	15	15	15	15	15	15	15	15	15	15	15	15	15	15	15	15	15	15
Metalurh Zaporizhzhia	15	15	14	15	15	15	15	16	16	16	16	16	16	16	16	16	16	16	16	16	16	16	16	16	16	16	16	16	16	16

== Season statistics ==
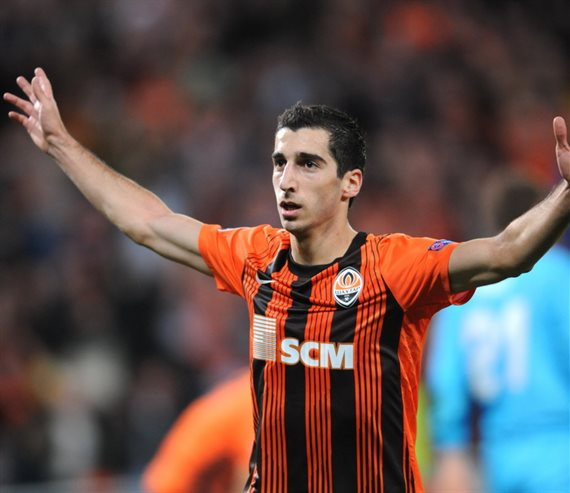
Mkhitaryan in 2012

=== Top scorers ===
Rank	Player	Club	Goals
1	(Armenia) Henrikh Mkhitaryan	Shakhtar Donetsk	25 (1)
2	(Nigeria) Brown Ideye	Dynamo Kyiv	17
3	(Brazil) Cleiton Xavier	Metalist Kharkiv	15 (3)
4	(Ukraine) Andriy Yarmolenko	Dynamo Kyiv	11
4	(Brazil) Júnior Moraes	Metalurh Donetsk	11 (3)
6	(Russia) Sergei Samodin	Kryvbas Kryvyi Rih	10
6	(Brazil) Alex Teixeira	Shakhtar Donetsk	10
6	(Ukraine) Oleksiy Antonov	Kryvbas Kryvyi Rih	10
9	(Brazil) Giuliano	Dnipro Dnipropetrovsk	9
9	(Mali) Dramane Traoré	Metalurh Donetsk	9
9	(Argentina) Jonathan Cristaldo	Metalist Kharkiv	9 (1)
9	(Ukraine) Marko Dević	Shakhtar Donetsk/Metalist Kharkiv	9 (1)
9	(Ukraine) Yevhen Seleznyov	Shakhtar Donetsk/Dnipro Dnipropetrovsk	9 (2)

=== Top assists ===
Rank	Player	Club	Assists
1	(Croatia) Darijo Srna	Shakhtar Donetsk	12
2	(Argentina) José Sosa	Metalist Kharkiv	8
2	(Ukraine) Dmytro Trukhin	Hoverla Uzhhorod	8
2	(Brazil) Marlos	Metalist Kharkiv	8
5	(Ukraine) Volodymyr Arzhanov	Arsenal Kyiv/Volyn Lutsk	7
6	(Brazil) Willian	Shakhtar Donetsk	6
6	(Brazil) Júnior Moraes	Metalurh Donetsk	6
6	(Brazil) Fernandinho	Shakhtar Donetsk	6
6	(Brazil) Taison	Shakhtar Donetsk/Metalist Kharkiv	6
6	(Brazil) Cleiton Xavier	Metalist Kharkiv	6
6	(Portugal) Miguel Veloso	Dynamo Kyiv	6
6	(Ukraine) Pavlo Ksyonz	Karpaty Lviv	6

=== Hat-tricks ===
Player	For	Against	Result	Date
(Armenia) Henrikh Mkhitaryan	Shakhtar Donetsk	Chornomorets Odesa	1–5	19 August 2012
(Mali) Dramane Traoré	Metalurh Donetsk	Kryvbas Kryvyi Rih	6–2	5 October 2012
(Spain) Lucas	Karpaty Lviv	Kryvbas Kryvyi Rih	6–0	4 November 2012
(Ukraine) Roman Zozulya	Dnipro Dnipropetrovsk	Illichivets Mariupol	7–0	26 May 2013

== Awards ==
=== Monthly awards ===
Month	UA-Football Player of the Month			
Month	Player	Nat	Club	Link
March	Andriy Yarmolenko	UKR	Dynamo Kyiv	2G 1A
April	Fernandinho	BRA	Shakhtar Donetsk	1A
May	Marko Dević	UKR	Metalist Kharkiv	3G

=== Season awards ===
The laureates of the 2012–13 UPL season were:

- Best player: (Armenia) Henrikh Mkhitaryan (Shakhtar Donetsk)
- Best coach: (Romania) Mircea Lucescu (Shakhtar Donetsk)
- Best goalkeeper: (Ukraine) Maksym Koval (Dynamo Kyiv)
- Best arbiter: (Ukraine) Yuriy Mozharovsky (Lviv)
- Best young player: (Ukraine) Eduard Sobol (Shakhtar Donetsk)
- Best goalscorer: (Armenia) Henrikh Mkhitaryan (Shakhtar Donetsk)

== Attendances ==
#	Football club	Average attendance
1	Shakhtar Donetsk	40,522
2	Metalist	30,478
3	Dynamo Kyiv	28,752
4	Chornomorets	22,238
5	Dnipro	16,902
6	Zorya	10,972
7	Karpaty	10,351
8	Illichivets	6,693
9	Tavriya	5,647
10	Vorskla	4,934
11	Metalurh Zaporizhzhya	4,897
12	Volyn	4,559
13	Goverla	4,247
14	Kryvbas	3,620
15	Arsenal Kyiv	2,710
16	Metalurh Donetsk	2,700

== See also ==
- 2012–13 Ukrainian First League
- 2012–13 Ukrainian Premier League Reserves and Under 19
- 2012–13 Ukrainian Second League
- 2012–13 Ukrainian Cup
- 2012–13 UEFA Europa League
- 2012–13 UEFA Champions League
