= Yuriy Seleznyov =

Ukrainian footballer and coach

Personal information
- Full name: Yuriy Oleksandrovych Seleznyov
- Date of birth: 18 December 1975 (age 50)
- Place of birth: Odesa, Ukrainian SSR
- Height: 1.82 m (5 ft 11 1/2 in)
- Positions: Forward; midfielder

Team information
- Current team: FC Chornomorets Odesa (academy coach)

Youth career
- FC Chornomorets Odesa

Senior career*
Years	Team	Apps	(Gls)
1992–1993	FC Chornomorets-2 Odesa	50	(9)
1993–1994	SC Odesa	35	(6)
1995–1997	FC Chornomorets Odesa	60	(6)
1997–2000	FC Shakhtar Donetsk	63	(17)
1997–2000	→ FC Shakhtar-2 Donetsk (loans)	18	(3)
2000–2001	FC Rostselmash Rostov-on-Don	17	(1)
2000	→ FC Rostselmash-2 Rostov-on-Don (loan)	4	(0)
2001–2003	FC Metalurh Donetsk	28	(3)
2001–2003	→ FC Metalurh-2 Donetsk (loan)	13	(2)
2003	FC Syhnal Odesa		
2003–2004	FC Kryvbas Kryvyi Rih	24	(1)
2003–2004	→ FC Kryvbas-2 Kryvyi Rih (loan)	3	(1)
2004–2005	FC Zakarpattia Uzhhorod	9	(0)
2005	SC Tavriya Simferopol	16	(1)
2006	FC Stal Dniprodzerzhynsk	16	(9)
2006	FC Spartak Nizhny Novgorod	17	(0)

Managerial career
- 2011–: FC Chornomorets Odesa (academy)
- * Club domestic league appearances and goals

Yuriy Oleksandrovych Seleznyov (Ukrainian: Юрій Олександрович Селезньов; born 18 December 1975 in Odesa) is a Ukrainian football coach and a former player. He works as a coach in the FC Chornomorets Odesa academy.

== Honours ==
Chornomorets Odesa

- Ukrainian Premier League runner-up: 1994–95, 1995–96

Shakhtar Donetsk

- Ukrainian Premier League runner-up: 1997–98, 1998–99, 1999–2000

Metalurh Donetsk

- Ukrainian Premier League bronze: 2001–02, 2002–03
