= Volodymyr Pyatenko =

Ukrainian footballer and coach

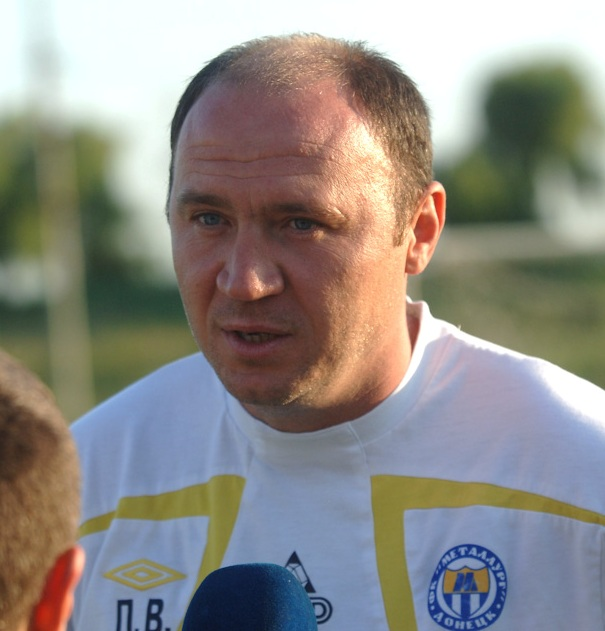

Personal information
- Full name: Volodymyr Mykolayovych Pyatenko
- Date of birth: 9 September 1974 (age 52)
- Place of birth: Prokopyevsk, Kemerovo Oblast, Russian SFSR, Soviet Union
- Height: 1.94 m (6 ft 4 1/2 in)
- Position: Defender

Team information
- Current team: FC Metalist 1925 Kharkiv (women), Ukraine (women) (manager)

Senior career*
Years	Team	Apps	(Gls)
1991–1992	Portovyk Kerch	27	(0)
1992–1995	Tavriya Simferopol	55	(1)
1995–1997	Shakhtar Donetsk	28	(1)
1996–1997	→ Shakhtar-2 Donetsk	11	(0)
1998–1999	Metalist Kharkiv	48	(1)
1998–1999	→ Metalist-2 Kharkiv	5	(0)
1999–2002	Metalurh Donetsk	34	(2)
2001–2002	→ Metalurh-2 Donetsk	18	(1)
2002	→ Vorskla Poltava (loan)	2	(0)
2003–2004	SKA-Energiya Khabarovsk	57	(4)
2005	Nyva Vinnytsia	12	(0)
Total		297	(11)

International career
1994–1995	Ukraine U21	8	(2)

Managerial career
- 2008–2010: Metalurh Donetsk (assistant)
- 2010–2011: Metalurh Donetsk (caretaker)
- 2011–2012: Metalurh Donetsk
- 2012–2013: Metalurh football school (director)
- 2013: Banants
- 2013: Metalurh Donetsk (caretaker)
- 2013–2014: Metalurh football school (director)
- 2014–2015: Metalurh Donetsk
- 2017: Krumkachy Minsk
- 2018: Obolon-Brovar Kyiv
- 2018–2019: Chornomorets Odesa (assistant)
- 2021–2023: Dynamo Kyiv (women)
- 2023–2025: Metalist 1925 Kharkiv (women)
- 2023–2024: Ukraine (women) (interim)
- 2024–2026: Ukraine (women)
- * Club domestic league appearances and goals

Volodymyr Mykolayovych Pyatenko (Ukrainian: Володимир Миколайович П'ятенко; born 9 September 1974) is a Ukrainian professional football coach and former player (defender).

== Career ==
On 12 November 2010, Pyatenko was appointed as interim coach to the Ukrainian Premier League club FC Metalurh Donetsk after resignation Nikolay Kostov.

On 3 May 2011 he was again appointed as interim coach for Metalurh Donetsk after resignation of the next coach, Andrei Gordeyev.

In the first half of 2013 Pyatenko was appointed the head coach of FC Banants which at the end of 2012–13 season finished last in the league.

He is married and has one daughter.

== Honours ==
=== Player ===
- Ukrainian Premier League: runner-up 1

1997

- Ukrainian Cup: 1

1997
