= RSC Olimpiyskiy =

Sports venue in Donetsk

RSK Olimpiyskyi
- Lokomotyv Stadium
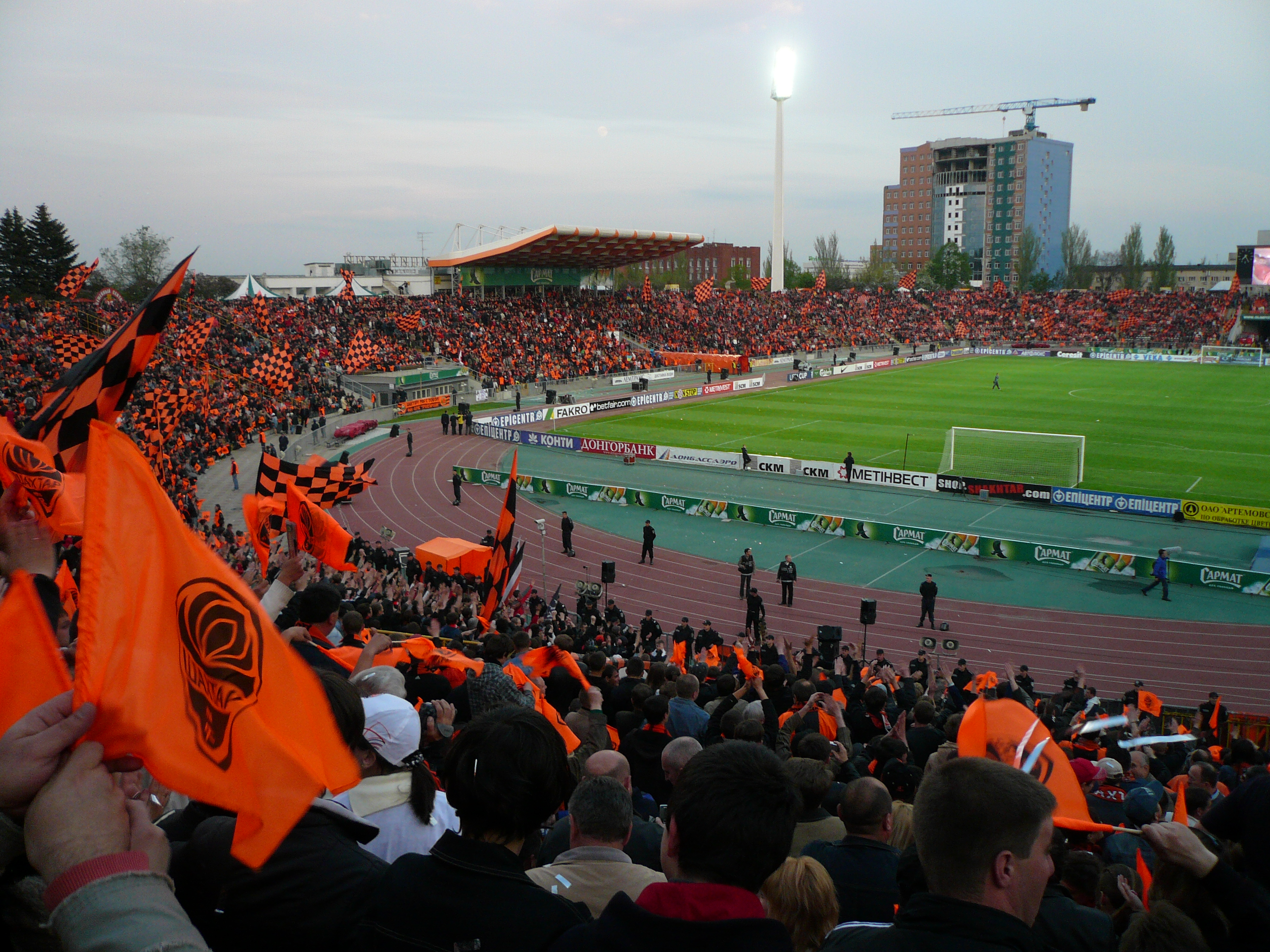
- Interactive map of RSK Olimpiyskyi
- Former names: Lokomotyv
- Location: Donetsk, Ukraine
- Coordinates: 48°01′11″N 37°48′15″E
- Owner: National Olympic Committee of Ukraine
- Capacity: 25,678 (football)
- Surface: Grass
- Field size: 105 m × 68 m (344 ft × 223 ft)

Construction
- Groundbreaking: July 1955
- Opened: 13 August 1958; 68 years ago
- Renovated: 2003
- Expanded: 2 August 1970
- Architects: Y. Revin; V. Holubkov

Tenants
- FC Lokomotyv Donetsk; Shakhtar reserves Metalurh Donetsk; Zorya Luhansk (2011)

Regional Sports Complex "Olimpiyskyi" stadium (Ukrainian: Регіональний спортивний комплекс «Олімпійський») is a multi-purpose stadium in Donetsk, Ukraine. The stadium is part of bigger sports complex Olimpiyskyi and until 2014 was property of the National Olympic Committee of Ukraine. Since 2014, along with the neighboring Donbas Arena, it has been occupied by Russia within the context of the Russo-Ukrainian War. It has a capacity of 25,678 people. In 2014, the stadium's ownership has changed.

Built in 1958 as part of whole Lokomotyv sports complex, it originally belonged to the Soviet Lokomotiv sports society. The stadium was built for the Donets Railway main football team that since 1948 played in Artemivsk (Bakhmut).

After its reconstruction in 2003, the stadium was also host to Shakhtar's city-rivals, FC Metalurh Donetsk. Shakhtar became the sole tenant of the stadium from 2004, until their new Donbas Arena was completed. FC Metalurh Donetsk has moved back to their own stadium, Metalurh Stadium which is considerably smaller.
