= Vitaliy Mintenko =

Ukrainian footballer

Vitaliy Mintenko Віталій Мінтенко
Personal information
- Full name: Vitaliy Heorhiyovych Mintenko
- Date of birth: 29 October 1972 (age 54)
- Place of birth: Storozhynets, Soviet Union (now Ukraine)
- Position: Midfielder

Youth career
- Kyiv sports boarding school

Senior career*
Years	Team	Apps	(Gls)
1989	Volyn Lutsk	4	(0)
1990–1991	Dynamo Kyiv	0	(0)
1992	Bukovyna Chernivtsi	16	(4)
1992–1994	Dynamo Kyiv	22	(3)
1993	→ Dynamo-2 Kyiv	3	(5)
1994	Maccabi Ironi Ashdod	6	(1)
1994–1995	Maccabi Herzliya	16	(2)
1995–1996	Bukovyna Chernivtsi	50	(20)
1997	Prykarpattia Ivano-Frankivsk	14	(4)
1997–2001	Metalurh Donetsk	65	(13)
1997–1998	→ Metalurh-2 Donetsk	2	(0)
1999	→ Hapoel Jerusalem (loan)	11	(3)
2001	→ Kryvbas Kryvyi Rih (loan)	5	(2)
2002–2003	Dnipro Dnipropetrovsk	1	(0)
2003	→ Dnipro-2 Dnipropetrovsk	4	(1)
2003	→ Metalist Kharkiv (loan)	10	(2)
- * Club domestic league appearances and goals

Vitaliy Heorhiyovych Mintenko (Ukrainian: Віталій Георгійович Мінтенко; born 29 October 1972) is a Ukrainian retired professional footballer.
