= Zé Leandro =

Brazilian footballer

Personal information
- Full name: José Leandro de Souza
- Date of birth: 14 May 1985 (age 41)
- Place of birth: Nhandeara – SP, Brazil
- Height: 1.80 m (5 ft 11 in)
- Position: Midfielder

Senior career*
Years	Team	Apps	(Gls)
–2004	Sociedade Esportiva Matsubara	?	(?)
2004–2008	Metalurh Donetsk	27	(0)
2004	→ Metalurh-2 Donetsk	3	(0)
2008	Arsenal Kyiv	0	(0)
2009	Paraná Clube	?	(?)
- * Club domestic league appearances and goals

José Leandro de Souza (born 14 May 1985), known as Zé Leandro, is a Brazilian professional footballer who last played for Paraná Clube for whom he signed in January 2009. He previously played for Sociedade Esportiva Matsubara, Metallurg Donetsk and FC Arsenal Kyiv.
