= Sunny Ekeh Kingsley =

Nigerian footballer

Sunny Kingsley
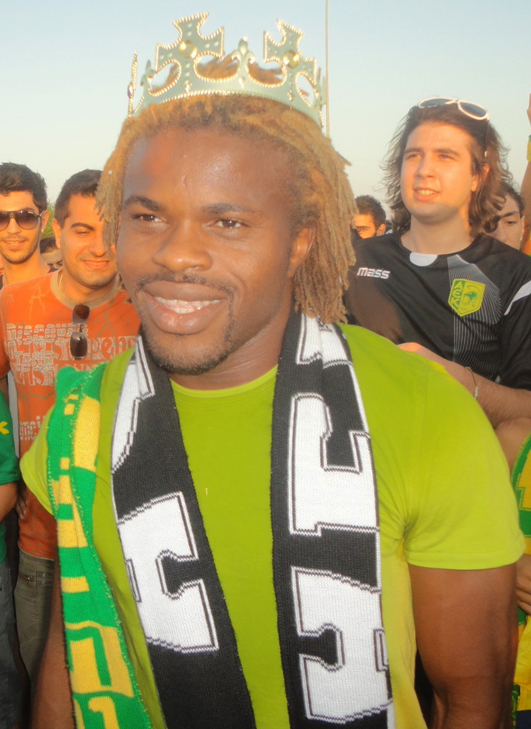
- Kingsley as an AEK player (2010)

Personal information
- Full name: Sunny Ekeh Kingsley
- Date of birth: 9 September 1981 (age 45)
- Place of birth: Owerri, Nigeria
- Height: 1.72 m (5 ft 8 in)
- Position: Forward

Youth career
- First Bank
- Soccer Warriors
- 1998–2000: União Leiria

Senior career*
Years	Team	Apps	(Gls)
2000–2001	União Tomar		
2001–2003	Caldas	68	(15)
2003–2005	Beira-Mar	61	(7)
2005–2006	Zamalek	5	(0)
2007–2008	AEK Larnaca	41	(15)
2008–2010	Metalurh Donetsk	44	(4)
2010–2012	AEK Larnaca	39	(3)
2014–2015	Nikos & Sokratis Erimis	19	(4)
Total		277	(48)
- * Club domestic league appearances and goals

Sunny Ekeh Kingsley (born 9 September 1981) is a Nigerian retired professional footballer who played as a forward.

== Club career ==
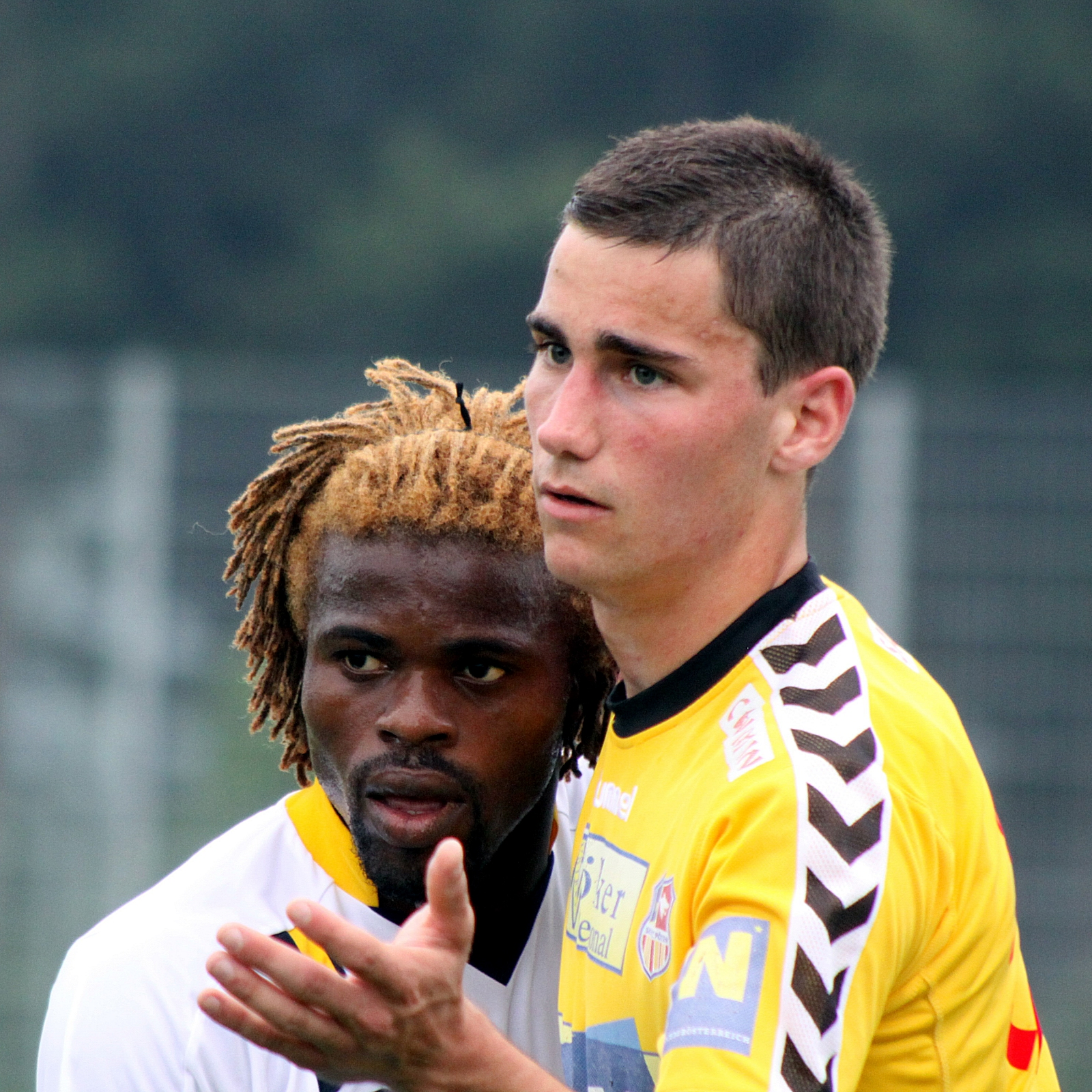
Kingsley in action for Metalurh Donetsk, against St. Pölten.

Born in Owerri, Kingsley moved to Portugal in 1998 still as a junior, finishing his grooming at U.D. Leiria. He made his senior debuts with amateurs U.F.C.I. Tomar, switching after one year to Caldas Sport Clube in the third division.

After stellar performances, Kingsley moved straight to the Primeira Liga in the 2003 summer, signing with S.C. Beira-Mar. He made his debut in the competition on 17 August in a 0–1 away loss against C.S. Marítimo (21 minutes played), and finished his first season with 33 games – 29 starts – and four goals, helping the Aveiro club to the 11th position.

Kingsley joined AEK Larnaca F.C. in the Cypriot First Division in January 2007, following an unassuming spell in Egypt with Zamalek SC. He scored four times in only ten appearances in his debut campaign, and also helped his team reach the semi-finals of the Cypriot Cup. In July 2008 he moved sides and countries again, signing for Ukrainian Premier League's FC Metalurh Donetsk for €620,000.

In July 2010, Kingsley returned to his previous club. He played the last match of his career on 29 January 2012, netting once in the 6–0 win over Nea Salamis Famagusta FC for the league championship; he retired subsequently at the age of only 30, and accepted an offer to become his last team's chief scout.

Kingsley came out of retirement in the 2014 summer after two years of inactivity, signing with Nikos & Sokratis Erimis also in Cyprus.
