= Ihor Luchkevych =

Ukrainian footballer

Personal information
- Full name: Ihor Valeriyovych Luchkevych
- Date of birth: 19 November 1973 (age 52)
- Place of birth: Oleksandrivka, Kherson Oblast, Ukrainian SSR
- Height: 1.76 m (5 ft 9 1/2 in)
- Position: Midfielder

Team information
- Current team: Mynai (assistant)

Youth career
- 198?–1989: Torpedo Melitopol
- 1989–1991: FC Orbita Zaporizhzhia

Senior career*
Years	Team	Apps	(Gls)
1991–1997	Metalurh Zaporizhzhia	173	(15)
1998	Metalurh Donetsk	14	(1)
1998–2003	Karpaty Lviv	69	(6)
1999–2003	→ Karpaty-2 Lviv	11	(0)
2003	→ Karpaty-3 Lviv	3	(0)
2003	→ Tavriya Simferopol (loan)	13	(0)
2003–2005	Metalurh Zaporizhzhia	44	(1)
2008	Metalurh-2 Zaporizhzhia	18	(1)
Total		345	(24)

International career
1992–1993	Ukraine-21	4	(0)
1996	Ukraine	2	(0)

Managerial career
- 2005–2012: Metalurh-2 Zaporizhzhia (assistant)
- 2012: Metalurh Zaporizhzhia (caretaker)
- 2012: Metalurh Zaporizhzhia (youth assistant)
- 2013: Metalurh Zaporizhzhia (youth)
- 2013–2015: Poltava (assistant)
- 2016–2017: Metalurh Zaporizhzhia (assistant)
- 2022–: Mynai (assistant)
- * Club domestic league appearances and goals

Ihor Luchkevych (Ukrainian: Ігор Валерійович Лучкевич; born 19 November 1973) is a Ukrainian retired professional football midfielder and current assistant manager at Mynai.

== Career ==
After retiring from playing career he worked in the structure of FC Metalurh Zaporizhzhia. From December 2013 he is working as assistant coach to the Ukrainian First League club FC Poltava after invitation to this position by Illya Blyznyuk.

== Personal life ==
His son Valeriy Luchkevych is also a professional footballer.
