= Oleksandr Sevidov =

Ukrainian footballer (born 1969)

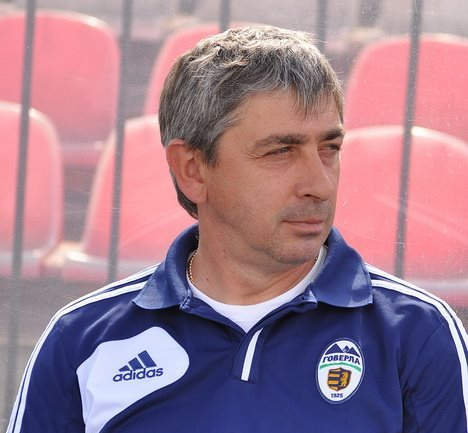
- Sevidov in 2013

Personal information
- Full name: Oleksandr Volodymyrovych Sevidov
- Date of birth: 18 July 1969 (age 57)
- Place of birth: Donetsk, Ukrainian SSR
- Height: 1.78 m (5 ft 10 in)
- Position: Midfielder

Youth career
- 1986–1987: Shakhtar Donetsk
- 1988: CSKA-2 Moscow

Senior career*
Years	Team	Apps	(Gls)
1988	CSKA-2 Moscow	29	(3)
1990–1993	Zorya Luhansk	121	(29)
1993	Torpedo Moscow	3	(0)
1994	Metalurh Zaporizhya	24	(4)
1994	Dynamo Luhansk	13	(8)
1995	UralAZ Miass	29	(14)
1996	Kryvbas Kryvyi Rih	14	(3)
1996–2000	Metalurh Donetsk	92	(34)
1997–1998	→ Metalurh-2 Donetsk	7	(1)
Total		332	(96)

Managerial career
- 2001–2002: Metalurh-2 Donetsk
- 2003: Metalurh Donetsk
- 2003–2004: Metalurh Donetsk (assistant)
- 2004–2005: Stal Dniprodzerzhynsk
- 2005–2006: Metalurh Donetsk
- 2006–2007: Helios Kharkiv
- 2007–2008: Zimbru Chişinău
- 2009–2011: Krymteplytsia Molodizhne
- 2011–2013: Zakarpattia/Hoverla Uzhhorod
- 2013–2014: Karpaty Lviv
- 2015–2016: Metalist Kharkiv
- 2016–2017: Mariupol
- 2019: Vereya
- * Club domestic league appearances and goals

Oleksandr Volodymyrovych Sevidov (Ukrainian: Олександр Володимирович Севідов; born 18 July 1969) is a Ukrainian football manager and former player. He played for clubs in Ukraine and Russia. He was appointed manager of struggling Vereya in January 2019, remaining in that capacity until late March 2019.
