= FC Arsenal Kyiv–FC Dynamo Kyiv rivalry =

Football rivalry in Ukraine

Main Kyiv derby
- Other names: Dynamo vs Arsenal
- Location: (Ukraine) Kyiv
- Teams: Dynamo Kyiv; Arsenal Kyiv
- First meeting: Dynamo 0–0 CSKA–Borysfen; 1995–96 Vyshcha Liha; 27 August 1995
- Latest meeting: Dynamo 4–0 Arsenal; Ukrainian Premier League (10 March 2019)
- Broadcasters
- Stadiums: Olimpiyskiy NSC; Dynamo Stadium

Statistics
- Most wins: Dynamo (21)

The Kyiv football derby (Ukrainian: Київське футбольне дербі) is a football match and the main city derby in the city of Kyiv between teams of Dynamo and Arsenal (including when it was named as FC CSCA Kyiv and CSKA-Borysfen).

The derby appeared for the first time when CSKA-Borysfen made it to the Ukrainian Higher League (Vyshcha Liha) in 1995. On 27 August 1995, Dynamo was hosting the Arsenal's predecessor CSKA-Borysfen and tied the game at 0. The game took place at the Republican Stadium.

== Statistics ==
Competition	Dynamo wins	Draws	Arsenal wins
League	19	3	0
Cup	2	0	0
Total	21	3	0
