= Adrian Pukanych =

Ukrainian footballer (born 1983)

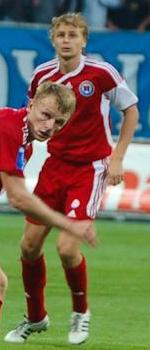

Personal information
- Full name: Adrian Mykolayovych Pukanych
- Date of birth: 22 June 1983 (age 43)
- Place of birth: Vynohradiv, Ukrainian SSR, Soviet Union
- Height: 1.85 m (6 ft 1 in)
- Position: Midfielder

Team information
- Current team: Epitsentr Dunaivtsi
- Number: 15

Youth career
- 1999–2000: Shakhtar Donetsk

Senior career*
Years	Team	Apps	(Gls)
2000–2009	Shakhtar Donetsk	34	(1)
2000–2001	→ Shakhtar-3 Donetsk	23	(0)
2001–2004	→ Shakhtar-2 Donetsk	27	(3)
2002	→ Polissya Zhytomyr (loan)	18	(2)
2005–2006	→ Illichivets Mariupol (loan)	32	(2)
2007	→ Vorskla Poltava (loan)	17	(0)
2008	→ Shakhtar-3 Donetsk	2	(0)
2009–2014	Illichivets Mariupol	85	(14)
2013–2014	→ Hoverla Uzhhorod (loan)	1	(0)
2015–2016	Shukura Kobuleti	36	(3)
2016	Sevlyush Vynohradiv		
2017	FC Poltava	0	(0)
2018	Sevlyush Vynohradiv		
2018–2019	Uzhhorod (amateur)		
2019–2021	Uzhhorod	46	(19)
2021–	Epitsentr Dunaivtsi	2	(0)

International career
2003–2006	Ukraine U21	28	(6)
2003–2004	Ukraine	2	(1)
Medal record
Men's football
Representing Ukraine
UEFA European Under-21 Championship
Runner-up	2006 Portugal
- * Club domestic league appearances and goals as of 18 September 2021

Adrian Pukanych (Ukrainian: Адріан Миколайович Пуканич; born 22 June 1983) is a Ukrainian professional footballer who plays as a midfielder for Epitsentr Dunaivtsi.

== International career ==
He played for Ukraine national under-21 football team and also played in the 2006 UEFA European Under-21 Football Championship, helping his side reach the final. He also was called up to Ukraine national football team for two matches and scored one goal.

=== International goals ===
Scores and results list Ukraine's goal tally first.

No.	Date	Venue	Opponent	Score	Result	Competition
1.	18 February 2004	June 11 Stadium, Tripoli, Libya	Libya	0–1	1–1	Friendly

== Honours ==
=== Team ===
- Ukrainian Premier League: champion 2005
- Ukrainian Premier League: runner-up 2003, 2004
- Ukrainian Cup: winner 2004
- Ukrainian Cup: runner-up 2003, 2005

Ukraine under-21

- UEFA Under-21 Championship runner-up: 2006
