= Nikolay Kostov =

Bulgarian footballer and manager

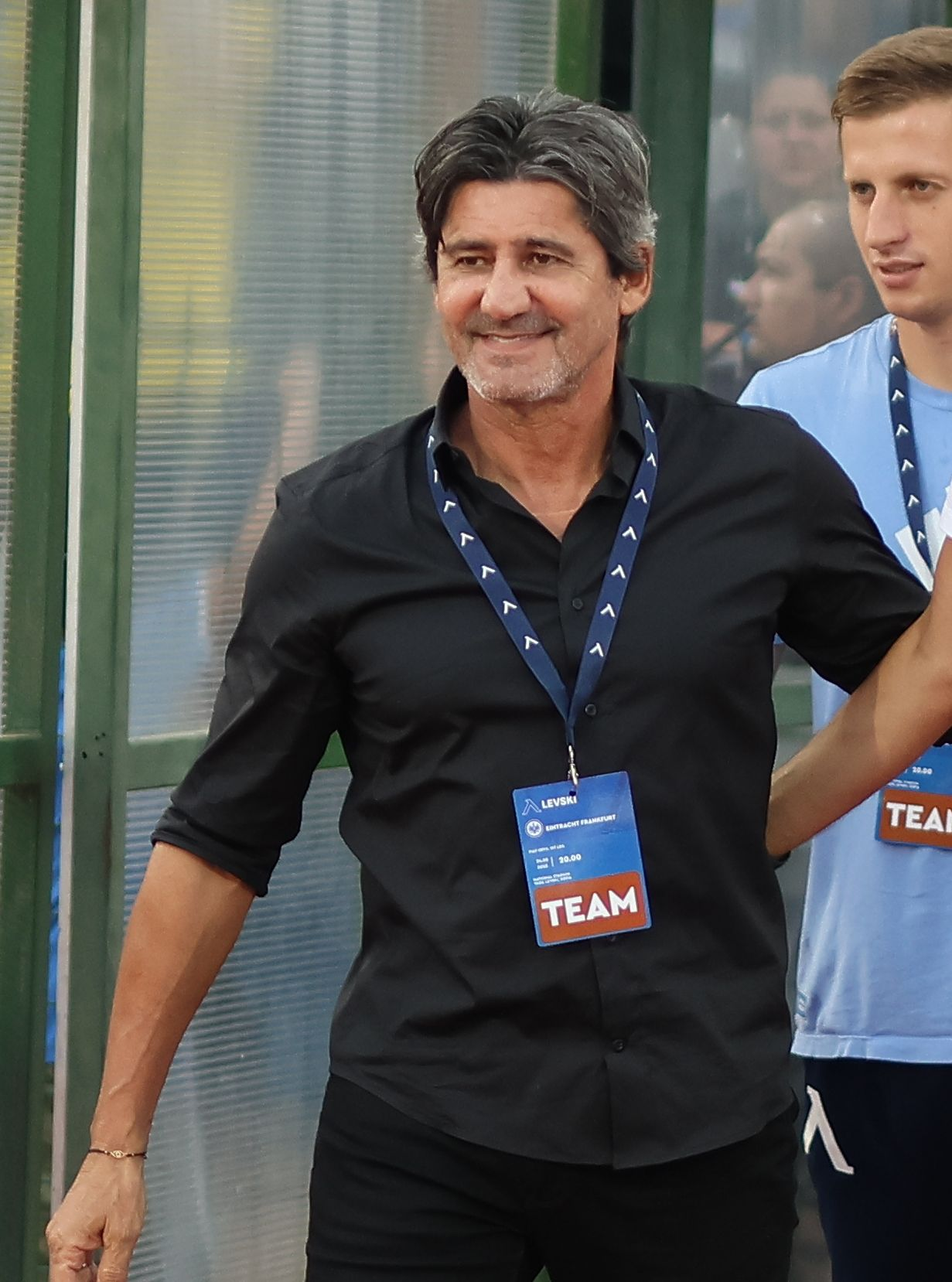

Personal information
- Full name: Nikolay Nikolov Kostov
- Date of birth: 2 July 1963 (age 63)
- Place of birth: Dobrich, Bulgaria
- Position: Midfielder

Senior career*
Years	Team	Apps	(Gls)
1981–1988	Dobrudzha Dobrich	192	(74)
1988–1989	Levski Sofia	6	(0)
1989–1990	Slavia Sofia	29	(9)
1990–1993	Anorthosis		
1994	Levski Sofia	2	(0)
1994	Spartak Varna	3	(0)

Managerial career
- 1996: Dobrudzha Dobrich (assistant)
- 2001–2002: Anorthosis
- 2003–2004: Onisilos Sotira
- 2004–2005: Olympiakos Nicosia
- 2005–2006: AEK Larnaca
- 2006–2007: Olympiakos Nicosia
- 2007–2008: Banants Yerevan
- 2008–2010: Metalurh Donetsk
- 2011–2012: Levski Sofia
- 2012–2013: Karpaty Lviv
- 2014: Tavriya Simferopol
- 2014–2015: Tosno
- 2015–2016: Botev Plovdiv
- 2017–2018: Stal Kamianske
- 2018–2019: Shakhter Karagandy
- 2022: Caspiy
- 2023–2024: Levski Sofia
- 2025–: Aktobe
- * Club domestic league appearances and goals

Nikolay Nikolov Kostov (Bulgarian: Николай Николов Костов; born 2 July 1963) is a Bulgarian former footballer and current manager of Kazakhstani club Aktobe.

== Career ==
Much of his coaching career has taken place in Cyprus. His first coaching role in the country was at Anorthosis, where he won the Cypriot Cup in 2002. In 2006, he joined Olympiakos Nicosia, but was replaced by Juan Ramon Rocha in October 2006. He was the coach for Metalurh Donetsk from 2008 to 2010, a role from which he resigned in November 2010.

On 4 November 2011, he was revealed as the new manager of Levski Sofia. His contract ran until the end of the 2011–12 season. He resigned from his position on 26 March 2012, after enduring his first and only defeat with the club - a 0:1 home loss against Minyor Pernik. In late July 2012, Kostov was appointed as the new head coach of Karpaty Lviv.

On 11 November 2015, Nikolay Kostov was appointed as the new head coach of Botev Plovdiv. On 24 August 2016, he was released from his duties.

After several years of coaching in Ukraine and Kazakhstan, on 13 June 2023, Kostov returned to Levski Sofia.

== Honours ==
- Anorthosis
  - Cypriot Cup: 2002
