= Metalurh Stadium (Donetsk) =

Football stadium in Donetsk, Ukraine

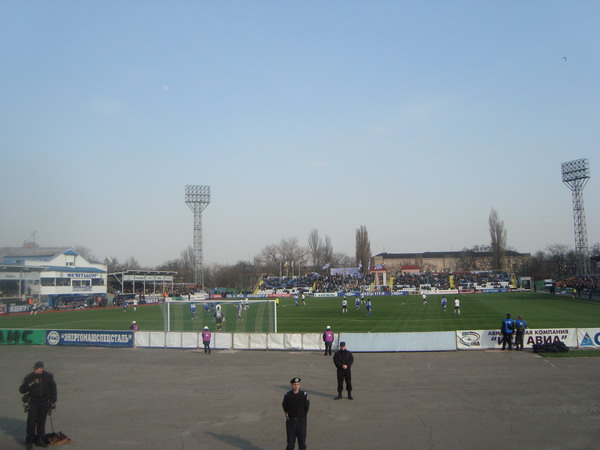
- Interactive map of Metalurh Stadium
- Former names: Donetsk Metallurgical Factory Stadium
- Location: Donetsk, Ukraine
- Coordinates: 47°58′23.60″N 37°47′53.30″E
- Owner: Metalurh Donetsk
- Capacity: 5,094 (football)
- Surface: Grass
- Field size: 106 m × 68 m (348 ft × 223 ft)

Tenant
- Metalurh Donetsk

Metalurh Stadium (Ukrainian: Стадіон «Металург») is a football-only stadium in Donetsk, Ukraine. It is currently used for football matches, and was the home of FC Metalurh Donetsk. The stadium's official maximum capacity is 5,094. It is not qualified to host UEFA competitions, therefore the team leased Shakhtar Stadium, for such games.

The stadium's full former name is the 125th Anniversary of Donetsk Metallurgical Factory Stadium. The stadium hosted matches of the 2009 UEFA European Football Championship among young men under the age of 19.

The stadium was, like many stadia in Ukraine, badly damaged in the 2022 Russian Invasion of Ukraine.
