= FC Metalurh-2 Donetsk =

Metalurh-2 Donetsk
- Full name: Football Club Metalurh-2 Donetsk
- Founded: 1996; 30 years ago
- Dissolved: 2004; 22 years ago
- President: Serhiy Taruta
- Website: http://metallurg.donetsk.ua/
Home colours	Away colours

Football Club Metalurh-2 Donetsk (Ukrainian: Футбольний Клуб Металург-2 Донецьк) was the reserve team of Metalurh Donetsk. Metalurh went bankrupt in July 2015.

== History ==
The club initially competed in the Donetsk Oblast competition as FC Metalurh-2 Donetsk.

In 2001 the club entered into the professional leagues to compete in the Second League.

== League and cup history ==
Season	Div.	Pos.	Pl.	W	D	L	GS	GA	P	Domestic Cup	Europe	Notes
2001–02	3rd "C"	3	34	19	9	6	60	36	66			
2002–03	3rd "C"	6	28	13	4	11	37	38	43			
2003–04	3rd "C"	13	30	5	8	17	23	56	23			Club moves to Reserve competition

== See also ==
- FC Metalurh Donetsk
