= 2013–14 FC Shakhtar Donetsk season =

Shakhtar Donetsk
2013–14 season
- Chairman: Rinat Akhmetov
- Manager: Mircea Lucescu
- Stadium: Donbas Arena
- Premier League: 1st
- Ukrainian Cup: Runners-up
- Super Cup: Winners
- UEFA Champions League: Group stage (3rd)
- UEFA Europa League: Round of 32
- Top goalscorer: League: Luiz Adriano (20); All: Luiz Adriano (25)
Home colours	Away colours	Third colours

The Shakhtar Donetsk 2013–14 season was Shakhtar's twenty third Ukrainian Premier League season, and they were the defending champions.

The 2013-14 Shakhtar Donetsk season was the clubs twenty-fourth season in which they retained their Ukrainian Premier League title and the Super Cup, whilst finishing as runners-up to FC Dynamo Kyiv in the Ukrainian Cup. In European competitions, Shakhtar finished third in their UEFA Champions League Group, and moved to the UEFA Europa League where they were knocked out at the Round of 32 by Viktoria Plzeň.

== Season events ==
In July, Shakhtar announced the signing of Facundo Ferreyra from Vélez Sarsfield on a contract until the summer of 2017.

On 7 June, Shakhtar announced the signing of Wellington Nem from Fluminense, to a five-year contract.

On 13 June, Shakhtar announced the signing of Fernando from Grêmio, to a five-year contract.

On 26 June, Shakhtar announced the signing of Fred from Internacional, to a five-year contract.

On 18 August, Shakhtar announced the signing of Bernard from Atlético Mineiro, to a five-year contract.

== Squad ==
As of match played 18 May 2014

Number	Name	Nationality	Position	Date of birth (age)	Signed from	Signed in	Contract ends	Apps.	Goals
Goalkeepers
23	Bohdan Sarnavskyi	(Ukraine)	GK	29 January 1995 (aged 19)	Arsenal Kyiv	2014		0	0
30	Andriy Pyatov	(Ukraine)	GK	28 June 1984 (aged 29)	Vorskla Poltava	2007		240	0
32	Anton Kanibolotskyi	(Ukraine)	GK	16 May 1988 (aged 26)	Dnipro Dnipropetrovsk	2012	2017	25	0
35	Mykyta Kryukov	(Ukraine)	GK	30 April 1991 (aged 23)	Academy	2008		0	0
72	Yaroslav Stavytskyi	(Ukraine)	GK	7 February 1995 (aged 19)	Academy	2013		0	0
Defenders
3	Tomáš Hübschman	(Czech Republic)	DF	4 September 1981 (aged 32)	Sparta Prague	2004		281	2
4	Oleksandr Volovyk	(Ukraine)	DF	30 October 1992 (aged 21)	Metalurh Donetsk	2013		5	0
5	Oleksandr Kucher	(Ukraine)	DF	22 October 1982 (aged 31)	Metalist Kharkiv	2006		213	7
13	Vyacheslav Shevchuk	(Ukraine)	DF	13 May 1979 (aged 35)	Dnipro Dnipropetrovsk	2005		199	3
14	Vasyl Kobin	(Ukraine)	DF	24 May 1985 (aged 28)	Karpaty Lviv	2009		67	4
27	Dmytro Chyhrynskyi (vice-captain)	(Ukraine)	DF	7 November 1986 (aged 27)	Barcelona	2010		183	15
31	Ismaily	(Brazil)	DF	11 January 1990 (aged 24)	Braga	2013	2017	14	2
33	Darijo Srna (Captain)	(Croatia)	DF	1 May 1982 (aged 32)	Hajduk Split	2003		412	37
38	Serhiy Kryvtsov	(Ukraine)	DF	15 March 1991 (aged 23)	Metalurh Zaporizhzhia	2010	2015	48	3
44	Yaroslav Rakitskyi	(Ukraine)	DF	3 August 1989 (aged 24)	Academy	2009		174	7
95	Eduard Sobol	(Ukraine)	DF	20 April 1995 (aged 19)	Metalurh Zaporizhzhia	2013		14	0
Midfielders
6	Taras Stepanenko	(Ukraine)	MF	8 August 1989 (aged 24)	Metalurh Zaporizhzhia	2010	2015	82	3
7	Wellington Nem	(Brazil)	MF	6 February 1992 (aged 22)	Fluminense	2013	2018	5	1
8	Fred	(Brazil)	MF	5 March 1993 (aged 21)	Internacional	2013	2018	31	4
10	Bernard	(Brazil)	MF	8 September 1992 (aged 21)	Atlético Mineiro	2013	2018	28	3
17	Fernando	(Brazil)	MF	3 March 1992 (aged 22)	Grêmio	2013	2018	22	2
20	Douglas Costa	(Brazil)	MF	14 September 1990 (aged 23)	Grêmio	2010	2015	168	33
28	Taison	(Brazil)	MF	17 January 1988 (aged 26)	Metalist Kharkiv	2013	2017	45	7
29	Alex Teixeira	(Brazil)	MF	6 January 1990 (aged 24)	Vasco da Gama	2010	2015	156	37
77	Ilsinho	(Brazil)	MF	12 October 1985 (aged 28)	São Paulo	2012	2015	154	22
Forwards
9	Luiz Adriano	(Brazil)	FW	12 April 1987 (aged 27)	Internacional	2007		232	105
11	Eduardo (Note: Eduardo was born in Rio de Janeiro, Brazil, but qualified to represent Croatia in 2002, representing them between 2004 and 2014.)	(Croatia)	FW	25 February 1983 (aged 31)	Arsenal	2010	2014	110	35
19	Facundo Ferreyra	(Argentina)	FW	14 March 1991 (aged 23)	Vélez Sarsfield	2013	2017	21	3
37	Anton Shynder	(Ukraine)	FW	13 June 1987 (aged 26)	Tavriya Simferopol	2013		1	0
89	Dentinho	(Brazil)	FW	19 January 1989 (aged 25)	Corinthians	2011	2016	27	3
Reserve squad
41	Serhiy Hryn	(Ukraine)	MF	6 June 1994 (aged 19)	Academy	2011		0	0
42	Valeriy Hryshyn	(Ukraine)	FW	12 June 1994 (aged 19)	Academy	2011		0	0
43	Yevhen Yefremov	(Ukraine)	DF	17 January 1994 (aged 20)	Academy	2011		0	0
46	Ihor Honchar	(Ukraine)	DF	10 January 1993 (aged 21)	Obolon-Brovar	2013		0	0
47	Vyacheslav Tankovskyi	(Ukraine)	MF	16 August 1995 (aged 18)	Academy	2008		0	0
49	Serhiy Vakulenko	(Ukraine)	MF	7 September 1993 (aged 20)	Illichivets Mariupol	2010		0	0
51	Taras Kacharaba	(Ukraine)	DF	7 January 1995 (aged 19)	Academy	2012		0	0
52	Maksym Shchichka	(Ukraine)	DF	4 February 1995 (aged 19)	Academy	2013		0	0
53	Volodymyr Doronin	(Ukraine)	MF	15 January 1993 (aged 21)	on loan from Olimpik Donetsk	2013	2014	0	0
55	Leonid Akulinin	(Ukraine)	FW	7 March 1993 (aged 21)	Academy	2009		0	0
56	Mykhaylo Shyshka	(Ukraine)	MF	5 July 1994 (aged 19)	Academy	2011		0	0
57	Mykhaylo Pysko	(Ukraine)	DF	19 March 1993 (aged 21)	Academy	2011		0	0
58	Rostyslav Bahdasarov	(Ukraine)	DF	24 May 1993 (aged 20)	Academy	2010		0	0
59	Oleksandr Zubkov	(Ukraine)	MF	3 August 1996 (aged 17)	Academy	2011		0	0
60	Ihor Duts	(Ukraine)	DF	11 April 1994 (aged 20)	Academy	2011		0	0
61	Denys Arendaruk	(Ukraine)	FW	16 April 1996 (aged 18)	Academy	2010		0	0
62	Danylo Sahutkin	(Ukraine)	DF	19 April 1996 (aged 18)	Academy	2013		0	0
63	Illya Hlushytskyi	(Ukraine)	DF	2 August 1993 (aged 20)	Academy	2013		0	0
64	Dmytro Ivanisenya	(Ukraine)	MF	11 January 1994 (aged 20)	Academy	2011		0	0
67	Denys Bezborodko	(Ukraine)	FW	31 May 1994 (aged 19)	Academy	2010		0	0
74	Viktor Kovalenko	(Ukraine)	MF	14 February 1996 (aged 18)	Academy	2008		0	0
Away on loan
	Mykyta Shevchenko	(Ukraine)	GK	26 January 1993 (aged 21)	Academy	2011		0	0
	Bohdan Butko	(Ukraine)	DF	13 January 1991 (aged 23)	Academy	2008		0	0
	Oleksandr Chyzhov	(Ukraine)	DF	10 August 1986 (aged 27)	Vorskla Poltava	2008		36	0
	Mykola Ishchenko	(Ukraine)	DF	9 March 1983 (aged 31)	Karpaty Lviv	2008		59	0
	Yaroslav Oliynyk	(Ukraine)	DF	14 March 1991 (aged 23)	Academy	2008		0	0
	Ivan Ordets	(Ukraine)	DF	8 July 1992 (aged 21)	Academy	2009		0	0
	Alan Patrick	(Brazil)	MF	13 May 1991 (aged 23)	Santos	2011	2016	6	2
	Bruno Renan	(Brazil)	MF	19 April 1991 (aged 23)	Villarreal	2010	2015	2	0
	Tornike Okriashvili	(Georgia (country))	MF	12 February 1992 (aged 22)	Gagra	2011		0	0
	David Targamadze	(Georgia (country))	MF	22 August 1989 (aged 24)	Oleksandriya	2011	2016	0	0
	Roman Yemelyanov	(Russia)	MF	8 May 1992 (aged 22)	Tolyatti	2010		1	0
	Vyacheslav Churko	(Ukraine)	MF	10 May 1993 (aged 21)	Academy	2009		0	0
	Dmytro Hrechyshkin	(Ukraine)	MF	22 September 1991 (aged 22)	Academy	2008		16	1
	Denys Kozhanov	(Ukraine)	MF	13 June 1987 (aged 26)	Academy	2005			
	Ruslan Malinovskyi	(Ukraine)	MF	4 May 1993 (aged 20)	Academy	2011		0	0
	Vladyslav Nasibulin	(Ukraine)	MF	6 July 1989 (aged 24)	Academy	2006			
	Oleksiy Polyanskyi	(Ukraine)	MF	12 April 1986 (aged 28)	Metalurh Donetsk	2006			
	Pylyp Budkivskyi	(Ukraine)	FW	10 March 1992 (aged 22)	Illichivets Mariupol	2013		0	0
	Oleksandr Karavayev	(Ukraine)	FW	2 June 1992 (aged 21)	Academy	2005		0	0
	Vitaliy Vitsenets	(Ukraine)	FW	3 August 1990 (aged 23)	Academy	2010	2015	24	2
Players who left during the season
99	Maicon	(Brazil)	FW	8 May 1988 (aged 26)	Volyn Lutsk	2012	2015	6	1

=== Out on loan ===
Note: Flags indicate national team as defined under FIFA eligibility rules; some limited exceptions apply. Players may hold more than one non-FIFA nationality.

No.	Pos.	Nation	Player
—	GK	UKR	Mykyta Shevchenko (on loan to Zorya Luhansk)
—	DF	UKR	Oleksandr Chyzhov (on loan to FC Sevastopol)
—	DF	UKR	Mykola Ischenko (on loan to Illichivets Mariupol)
—	DF	UKR	Ivan Ordets (on loan to Illichivets Mariupol)
—	DF	UKR	Bohdan Butko (on loan to Illichivets Mariupol)
—	MF	BRA	Alan Patrick (on loan to (Brazil) Internacional)
—	MF	BRA	Bruno Renan (on loan to (Brazil) Criciúma)
—	MF	GEO	Tornike Okriashvili (on loan to Illichivets Mariupol)
—	MF	GEO	David Targamadze (on loan to Illichivets Mariupol)
—	MF	RUS	Roman Yemelyanov (on loan to Illichivets Mariupol)

No.	Pos.	Nation	Player
—	MF	UKR	Vyacheslav Churko (on loan to Illichivets Mariupol)
—	MF	UKR	Denys Kozhanov (on loan to FC Sevastopol)
—	MF	UKR	Ruslan Malinovskyi (on loan to FC Sevastopol)
—	MF	UKR	Vladyslav Nasibulin (on loan to Zirka Kirovohrad)
—	MF	UKR	Yaroslav Oliynyk (on loan to Zorya Luhansk)
—	MF	UKR	Oleksiy Polyanskyi (on loan to Illichivets Mariupol)
—	MF	UKR	Vitaliy Vitsenets (on loan to FC Sevastopol)
—	FW	UKR	Oleksandr Karavayev (on loan to FC Sevastopol)
—	FW	UKR	Pylyp Budkivskiy (on loan to FC Sevastopol)

== Transfers ==
=== In ===
Date	Position	Nationality	Name	From	Fee	Ref.
6 June 2013	FW	(Brazil)	Wellington Nem	Fluminense	€9,000,000	
10 June 2013	DF	(Ukraine)	Oleksandr Volovyk	Metalurh Donetsk	Undisclosed	
13 June 2013	MF	(Brazil)	Fernando	Grêmio	€11,000,000	
26 June 2013	MF	(Brazil)	Fred	Internacional	€15,000,000	
1 July 2013	GK	(Ukraine)	Bohdan Sarnavskyi	Arsenal Kyiv	Undisclosed	
1 July 2013	FW	(Ukraine)	Anton Shynder	Tavriya Simferopol	Undisclosed	
9 July 2013	FW	(Argentina)	Facundo Ferreyra	Vélez Sarsfield	Undisclosed	
8 August 2013	MF	(Brazil)	Bernard	Atlético Mineiro	€25,000,000	

=== Out ===
Date	Position	Nationality	Name	To	Fee	Ref.
6 June 2013	MF	(Brazil)	Fernandinho	Manchester City	Undisclosed	
1 July 2013	DF	(Romania)	Răzvan Raț	West Ham United	Undisclosed	
1 July 2013	MF	(Ukraine)	Oleksiy Gai	Chornomorets Odesa	Undisclosed	
8 July 2013	MF	(Armenia)	Henrikh Mkhitaryan	Borussia Dortmund	Undisclosed	
8 January 2014	DF	(Ukraine)	Oleksandr Chyzhov	Illichivets Mariupol	Undisclosed	

=== Loans out ===
Date From	Position	Nationality	Name	To	Date To	Ref.
1 July 2011	DF	(Ukraine)	Bohdan Butko	Illichivets Mariupol	31 December 2014	
24 January 2013	FW	(Brazil)	Dentinho	Beşiktaş	31 December 2013	
1 March 2013	MF	(Brazil)	Bruno Renan	Criciúma	31 December 2013	
13 June 2013	FW	(Ukraine)	Pylyp Budkivskyi	Sevastopol	31 December 2013	
1 July 2013	DF	(Ukraine)	Oleksandr Chyzhov	Sevastopol	27 November 2013	
1 July 2013	MF	(Ukraine)	Vitaliy Vitsenets	Sevastopol	31 December 2013	
9 July 2013	MF	(Brazil)	Alan Patrick	Internacional	31 December 2013	
18 July 2013	GK	(Ukraine)	Mykyta Shevchenko	Illichivets Mariupol	30 June 2016	
2 September 2013	FW	(Brazil)	Maicon	Illichivets Mariupol	31 December 2013	
1 January 2014	MF	(Ukraine)	Vitaliy Vitsenets	Illichivets Mariupol	30 June 2014	
1 January 2014	FW	(Ukraine)	Pylyp Budkivskyi	Zorya Luhansk	30 June 2014	
6 January 2014	FW	(Ukraine)	Dmytro Hrechyshkin	Illichivets Mariupol	30 June 2014	
7 January 2014	FW	(Ukraine)	Ruslan Malinovskyi	Zorya Luhansk	31 December 2015	
27 January 2014	MF	(Georgia (country))	Tornike Okriashvili	Chornomorets Odesa	30 June 2014	
20 March 2014	MF	(Brazil)	Alan Patrick	Internacional	31 December 2014	

=== Released ===
Date	Position	Nationality	Name	Joined	Date	Ref.
8 February 2014	FW	(Brazil)	Maicon	Deceased		

== Friendlies ==
19 June 2013	Shakhtar Donetsk (Ukraine)	2 – 1	(Russia) FC Krasnodar	Going, Austria
18:30 EET (UTC+3)	Douglas Costa 10'; Adriano 29'	Report	Pereya 16'	Stadium: Stadion Wilder Kaiser; Referee: Mirco Ostojic

21 June 2013	Shakhtar Donetsk (Ukraine)	7 – 0	(Albania) Skënderbeu Korçë	Going, Austria
20:00 EET (UTC+3)	Adriano 6'; Douglas Costa 30'; Patrick 41'; Taison 50' (pen.); Bolbat 75', 79'; Maicon 86'	Report		Stadium: Stadion Wilder Kaiser; Referee: Roland Tratter

23 June 2013	Shakhtar Donetsk (Ukraine)	0 – 1	(Georgia (country)) Dinamo Tbilisi	Going, Austria
18:00 EET (UTC+3)		Report	Xisco 33'	Stadium: Stadion Wilder Kaiser; Referee: Carl Weber

25 June 2013	Shakhtar Donetsk (Ukraine)	2 – 0	(Austria) Wacker Innsbruck	Going, Austria
20:00 EET (UTC+3)	Adriano 57'; Nem 71'	Report		Stadium: Stadion Wilder Kaiser; Referee: Michael Dahauer (Austria)

27 June 2013	Zenit Saint Petersburg (Russia)	0 – 1	(Ukraine) Shakhtar Donetsk	Moscow, Russia
20:30 EET (UTC+3)		Report	Douglas Costa 69'	Stadium: Dynamo Stadium; Referee: Serhiy Boyko (Ukraine)

30 June 2013	Shakhtar Donetsk (Ukraine)	0 – 0	(Russia) Spartak Moscow	Donetsk, Ukraine
19:00 EET (UTC+3)		Report		Stadium: Donbas Arena; Attendance: 24,391; Referee: Anatoliy Abdula (Ukraine)

3 July 2013	Spartak Moscow (Russia)	2 – 0	(Ukraine) Shakhtar Donetsk	Moscow, Russia
18:30 EET (UTC+3)	Movsisyan 43' (pen.); Yakovlev 75'	Report		Stadium: Streltsov Sports Complex; Referee: Maksim Layushkin (Russia)

6 July 2013	Shakhtar Donetsk (Ukraine)	0 – 1	(Russia) Zenit Saint Petersburg	Donetsk, Ukraine
19:00 EET (UTC+3)		Report	Bystrov 89'	Stadium: Donbas Arena; Attendance: 23,331; Referee: Serhiy Berezka (Ukraine)

17 July 2013	Kayserispor (Turkey)	1 – 2	(Ukraine) Shakhtar Donetsk	Kayseri, Turkey
20:45 EET (UTC+3)	Mouche 68'	Report	Douglas Costa 65'; Maicon 82'	Stadium: Kadir Has Stadium; Referee: Özgüç Turkalp (Turkey)

== Competitions ==
=== Overall ===
Competition	First match	Last match	Starting round	Final position	Record							
Competition	First match	Last match	Starting round	Final position	Pld	W	D	L	GF	GA	GD	Win %
Premier League	14 July 2013	18 May 2014	Matchday 1	Winners	28	21	2	5	62	23	+39	75.00
Ukrainian Cup	25 September 2013	15 May 2014	Round of 32	Runners-up	5	4	0	1	12	2	+10	80.00
Super Cup	10 July 2013		Final	Winners	1	1	0	0	3	1	+2	100.00
UEFA Champions League	18 September 2013	10 December 2013	Group Stage	Group Stage	6	2	2	2	7	6	+1	33.33
UEFA Europa League	20 February 2014	27 February 2014	Last 32	Last 32	2	0	1	1	2	3	−1	0.00
Total					42	28	5	9	86	35	+51	66.67

Last updated: 18 May 2014
Source: Results

=== Super Cup ===
10 July 2013	Chornomorets Odesa	1 – 3	Shakhtar Donetsk	Odesa
21:00 EEST (UTC+3)	Antonov 45+1'	Report	Fred 17', 33'; Taison 68' (pen.)	Stadium: Chornomorets Stadium; Attendance: 32,400; Referee: Serhiy Boyko (Ukraine)

=== Premier League ===
==== Results summary ====
Overall								Home						Away					
Pld	W	D	L	GF	GA	GD	Pts	W	D	L	GF	GA	GD	W	D	L	GF	GA	GD
28	21	2	5	62	23	+39	65	12	1	1	32	7	+25	9	1	4	30	16	+14

==== Results by round ====
Round	1	2	3	4	5	6	7	8	9	10	11	12	13	14	15	16	17	18	19	20	21	22	23	24	25	26	27	28	29	30
Ground	H	A	H	H	A	H	A	H	A	H	A	H	A	H	A	A	H	A	A	H	A	H	A	A	H	H	A	H	A	H
Result	W	W	W	W	W	W	L	D	L	W	D	C	W	W	L	W	W	W	W	L	W	W	L	W	W	W	C	W	W	W
Position	1	1	1	1	1	1	1	1	2	2	2	3	3	2	2	2	1	1	1	1	1	1	1	1	1	1	1	1	1	1

Updated to match(es) played on 22 October 2014. Source: Socceraway
A = Away; H = Home; W = Win; D = Draw; L = Loss; C = Cancelled

==== Results ====
14 July 2013 1	Shakhtar Donetsk	2 – 0	Hoverla Uzhhorod	Donetsk
19:00 EEST (UTC+3)	Hrechyshkin 47'; Luiz Adriano (yellow card) 63' (goal) 89'	Summary	Lyulka (yellow card) 21'; Trukhin (yellow card) 77'	Stadium: Donbas Arena; Attendance: 36,301; Referee: Yuriy Vaks

21 July 2013 2	Sevastopol	1 – 3	Shakhtar Donetsk	Bakhchysarai
19:00 EEST (UTC+3)	Farley (yellow card) 39'; Kozhanov 60'; Kramar (yellow card) 84'; Symonenko (yellow card) 87'; Vitsenets (yellow card) 90+4'	Summary	Fred 24'; Luiz Adriano 78'; Wellington 89'; Srna (yellow card) 90+2'	Stadium: Sevastopol Sports Complex; Attendance: 5,641; Referee: Anatoliy Abdula

28 July 2013 3	Shakhtar Donetsk	1 – 0	Chornomorets Odesa	Donetsk
19:00 EEST (UTC+3)	Douglas Costa 72'	Summary	Pryyomov (yellow card) 49'; Bobko (yellow card) 54'; Antonov (yellow card) 73'	Stadium: Donbas Arena; Attendance: 41,704; Referee: Yuriy Moseichuk

4 August 2013 4	Shakhtar Donetsk	3 – 1	Dynamo Kyiv	Donetsk
19:00 EET (UTC+3)	Srna 2'; Kucher (yellow card) 34'; Eduardo 53'; Luiz Adriano (yellow card) 59'; Teixeira 84'	Summary	Belhanda 8'; Haruna (yellow card) 45+1'; Yarmolenko (yellow card) 56'; Khacheridi (yellow card) 59'; Mbokani (yellow card) 75'	Stadium: Donbas Arena; Attendance: 52,667; Referee: Viktor Shvetsov

10 August 2013 5	Tavriya Simferopol	0 – 4	Shakhtar Donetsk	Simferopol
19:30 EEST (UTC+3)		Summary	Fred 9'; Chyhrynskyi (yellow card) 26'; Luiz Adriano 47', 54'; Datsenko 48' (o.g.)	Stadium: RSC Lokomotiv; Attendance: 10,500; Referee: Serhiy Berezka

18 August 2013 6	Shakhtar Donetsk	2 – 0	Metalurh Zaporizhya	Donetsk
19:00 EET (UTC+3)	Srna 15'; Luiz Adriano 88'	Summary	A.Godin (yellow card) 38'; Havrysh (yellow card) 71'	Stadium: Donbas Arena; Attendance: 41,817; Referee: Vitaliy Hodulyan

25 August 2013 7	Dnipro Dnipropetrovsk	3 – 1	Shakhtar Donetsk	Dnipropetrovsk
19:30 EEST (UTC+3)	Kankava (yellow card) 24'; Seleznyov (yellow card) 33' (goal) 73' (pen.); Zozulya (yellow card) 44' (goal) 48', 63'; Fedetskyi (yellow card) 50'; Rotan (yellow card) 67'	Summary	Stepanenko (yellow card) 24'; Kucher (yellow card) 50' (goal) 90+1'; Rakytskiy (yellow card) 62'; Taison (yellow card) 74'; Shevchuk (yellow card) 87'	Stadium: Dnipro Arena; Attendance: 28,092; Referee: Anatoliy Zhabchenko

31 August 2013 8	Shakhtar Donetsk	1 – 1	Metalist Kharkiv	Donetsk, Ukraine
19:30 EEST (UTC+3)	Kryvtsov (yellow card) 26'; Stepanenko (yellow card) 54' (goal) 59'; Srna (yellow card) 90' (yellow-red card) 90+4'	Summary	Sosa (yellow card) 21'; Dević 77'	Stadium: Donbas Arena; Attendance: 50,078; Referee: Yevhen Aranovskiy

13 September 2013 9	Karpaty Lviv	3 – 2	Shakhtar Donetsk	Lviv, Ukraine
19:00 EEST (UTC+3)	Hladkyi 7'; Bartulović 52' (pen.), 61'; Balažic (yellow card) 54'; Fedorchuk (yellow card) 58'; Holodyuk (yellow card) 90+4'; Ilyuschenkov (yellow card) 90+5'	Summary	Douglas Costa 23'; Kucher (yellow card) 38'; Taison (yellow card) 43'; Kanibolotskyi (yellow card) 51'; Eduardo (yellow card) 67'; Ismaily 71'	Stadium: Ukraina Stadium; Attendance: 10,300; Referee: Oleksandr Derdo

21 September 2013 10	Shakhtar Donetsk	3 – 0	Vorskla Poltava	Donetsk, Ukraine
18:30 EEST (UTC+3)	Shevchuk (yellow card) 17'; Ferreyra 35'; Hübschman 49'; Fred (yellow card) 58'; Fernando 80'	Summary	Perduta (yellow card) 8'; Dedechko (yellow card) 39'; A.Kurilov (yellow card) 76'	Stadium: Donbas Arena; Attendance: 39,678; Referee: Yuriy Mozharovskyi

28 September 2013 11	Metalurh Donetsk	2 – 2	Shakhtar Donetsk	Donetsk, Ukraine
18:30 EEST (UTC+3)	Nelson (yellow card) 21'; Rakytskiy 24' (o.g.); Checher (yellow card) 42'; Moraes (yellow card) 45+2' (goal) 51'; Pryima (yellow card) 66'; Alexandre (yellow card) 71'; Daniel (yellow card) 90'	Summary	Douglas Costa (yellow card) 38'; Teixeira 54'; Ilsinho (yellow card) 76'; Eduardo 82'	Stadium: Metalurh Stadium; Attendance: 3,500; Referee: Serhiy Boyko

5 October 2013 12	Shakhtar Donetsk	Annulled	Arsenal Kyiv	Donetsk, Ukraine
18:30 EEST (UTC+3)	Ferreyra 10', 48', 54'; Teixeira 44', 45+1'; Eduardo (yellow card) 51' (goal) 58'; Ismaily 62'	Report	Khomyn (yellow card) 19'	Stadium: Donbas Arena; Attendance: 31,924; Referee: Kostyantyn Trukhanov

19 October 2013 13	Illichivets Mariupol	1 – 3	Shakhtar Donetsk	Mariupol, Ukraine
16:00 EEST (UTC+3)	Ischenko (yellow card) 33'; Stepanenko 38' (o.g.); Ordets (yellow card) 45'	Summary	Srna 66' (pen.), 73' (pen.); Luiz Adriano 85'	Stadium: Illichivets Stadium; Attendance: 3,200; Referee: Yury Vaks

26 October 2013 14	Shakhtar Donetsk	4 – 0	Zorya Luhansk	Donetsk, Ukraine
16:00 EEST (UTC+3)	Stepanenko 14'; Bernard 19'; Ferreyra 22', 51'; Rakytskiy (yellow card) 41'	Summary	Kamenyuka (yellow card) 18'	Stadium: Donbas Arena; Attendance: 38,173; Referee: Sergiy Berezka

1 November 2013 15	Volyn Lutsk	2 – 0	Shakhtar Donetsk	Lutsk, Ukraine
19:00 EET (UTC+2)	Siminin (yellow card) 20'; Memeshev 25', 69'; Nedilko (yellow card) 45+2'; Bicfalvi (yellow card) 85'	Summary	Fred (yellow card) 35'; Hübschman (yellow card) 45+2'	Stadium: Avanhard Stadium; Attendance: 7,560; Referee: Sergiy Dankovskyi

9 November 2013 16	Hoverla Uzhhorod	0 – 2	Shakhtar Donetsk	Uzhhorod, Ukraine
18:30 EET (UTC+2)	Savić (yellow card) 15'; Lysenko (yellow card) 40'; Balafas (yellow card) 50'; Lyulka (yellow card) 70'; Yezerskiy (yellow card) 74'	Summary	Stepanenko (yellow card) 39'; Kryvtsov 54'; Eduardo 72' (yellow card) 90'; Rakytskiy (yellow card) 86'	Stadium: Avanhard Stadium; Attendance: 8,800; Referee: Victor Shvetsov

23 November 2013 17	Shakhtar Donetsk	4 – 0	Sevastopol	Donetsk, Ukraine
16:00 EET (UTC+3)	Taison 8'; Chyhrynskyi 23' (yellow card) 80'; Luiz Adriano 26'; Srna 34'	Summary	O.Chizhov (yellow card) 33'	Stadium: Donbas Arena; Attendance: 36,960; Referee: Vitaliy Godulyan

3 December 2013 18	Chornomorets Odesa	0 – 1	Shakhtar Donetsk	Odesa, Ukraine
19:00 EET (UTC+2)	Kutos (yellow card) 35'; Fontanello (yellow card) 84'	Summary	Luiz Adriano 44'; Fred (yellow card) 90+1'	Stadium: Chornomorets Stadium; Attendance: 24,150; Referee: Sergiy Boyko

1 March 2014 19	Dynamo Kyiv	Postponed	Shakhtar Donetsk	Kyiv
		[ Summary]		Stadium: NSC Olimpiyskiy

16 March 2014 21	Metalurh Zaporizhya	0 – 3	Shakhtar Donetsk	Zaporizhzhia
17:00 EET (UTC+2)		Summary	Luiz Adriano 22'; Teixeira 29', 81'	Stadium: Slavutych-Arena; Attendance: 9,800; Referee: Kostyantin Trukhanov

22 March 2014 22	Shakhtar Donetsk	0 – 2	Dnipro Dnipropetrovsk	Donetsk
15:00 EET (UTC+2)	Hübschman (yellow card) 17'; Rakytskiy (yellow card) 62'; Srna (yellow card) 64'	Summary	Fedetskyi (yellow card) 22' (goal) 45'; Konoplyanka (yellow card) 37'; Boyko (yellow card) 70'; Matheus 83'	Stadium: Donbas Arena; Attendance: 33,827; Referee: Anatloiy Abdula

30 March 2014 23	Metalist Kharkiv	2 – 4	Shakhtar Donetsk	Kharkiv
19:30 EEST (UTC+3)	Kucher 7' (o.g.); Marlos 32' (pen.); Villagra (yellow card) 54' (yellow-red card) 55'; Diego Souza (yellow card) 90+2'	Summary	Kucher (yellow card) 31'; Douglas Costa 36'; Eduardo 38'; Srna 45'; Stepanenko (yellow card) 59'; Luiz Adriano 74'	Stadium: OSC Metalist; Attendance: 24,256; Referee: Anatoliy Zhabchenko

5 April 2014 24	Shakhtar Donetsk	3 – 0	Karpaty Lviv	Donetsk
17:00 EEST (UTC+3)	Eduardo 12', 43'; Luiz Adriano 51'	Summary	Chachua (yellow card) 39'	Stadium: Donbas Arena; Attendance: 29,157; Referee: Kostyantin Trukhanov

12 April 2014 25	Vorskla Poltava	1 – 0	Shakhtar Donetsk	Poltava
14:00 EEST (UTC+3)	Dedechko (yellow card) 80'; Jahović 83'	Summary	Bernard (yellow card) 78'; Rakytskiy (yellow card) 79'; Fred (yellow card) 89'; Stepanenko (yellow card) 90'	Stadium: Oleksiy Butovskyi Vorskla Stadium; Attendance: 7,000; Referee: Yury Vaks

16 April 2014 19	Dynamo Kyiv	0 – 2	Shakhtar Donetsk	Kyiv
20:00 EEST (UTC+3)	Vukojević (yellow card) 14'; Silva (yellow card) 45+1'; Belhanda (yellow card) 60'; Makarenko (yellow card) 75'	Summary	Luiz Adriano 10', 33'; Rakytskiy (yellow card) 20'; Ilsinho (yellow card) 28'; Kucher (yellow card) 60'	Stadium: NSC Olimpiyskiy; Attendance: 59,360; Referee: Anatoliy Abdula

19 April 2014 26	Shakhtar Donetsk	2 – 1	Metalurh Donetsk	Donetsk
17:00 EEST (UTC+3)	Srna (yellow card) 32'; Kryvtsov 55'; Luiz Adriano 62'; Ilsinho (yellow card) 86'; Teixeira (yellow card) 89'	Summary	Bolbat (yellow card) 34'; Pryima 49'; Checher (yellow card) 78'	Stadium: Donbas Arena; Attendance: 23,770; Referee: Victor Shvetsov

23 April 2014 20	Shakhtar Donetsk	2 – 1	Tavriya Simferopol	Donetsk
19:00 EEST (UTC+3)	Bernard 30'; Eduardo 36'	Summary	Célio (yellow card) 44'; Boussaïdi 61'	Stadium: Donbas Arena; Attendance: 22,241; Referee: Sergiy Lysenchuk

25 April 2014 27	Arsenal Kyiv	Cancelled	Shakhtar Donetsk	Kyiv
EEST (UTC+3)		Summary		Stadium: Valeriy Lobanovskyi Dynamo Stadium

2 May 2014 28	Shakhtar Donetsk	3 – 1	Illichivets Mariupol	Donetsk
19:30 EEST (UTC+3)	Luiz Adriano 26', 67'; Douglas Costa 82'; Rakytskiy (yellow card) 86'	Summary	Mandzyuk (yellow card) 49'; Yavorskyi (yellow card) 51'; Totovytskyi 58'; Shevchuk (yellow card) 82'	Stadium: Donbas Arena; Attendance: 18,017; Referee: Kostyantin Trukhanov

11 May 2014 29	Zorya Luhansk	1 – 3	Shakhtar Donetsk	Mykolaiv
16:00 EEST (UTC+3)	Vernydub (yellow card) 3'; Shevchenko (red card) 12'; Ljubenović 45+4'; Šunjić (yellow card) 54'	Summary	Luiz Adriano 16' (pen.), 29'; Fred (yellow card) 39'; Eduardo 90+2'	Stadium: Tsentralnyi Stadion; Referee: Evgen Aranovskiy

18 May 2014 30	Shakhtar Donetsk	2 – 0	Volyn Lutsk	Mykolaiv
14:00 EEST (UTC+3)	Luiz Adriano 30', 63'	Summary		Stadium: Tsentralnyi Stadion; Attendance: 2,300; Referee: Ivan Bondar

==== League table ====
Pos	Team	Pld	W	D	L	GF	GA	GD	Pts	Qualification or relegation
1	Shakhtar Donetsk (C)	28	21	2	5	62	23	+39	65	Qualification for the Champions League group stage
2	Dnipro Dnipropetrovsk	28	18	5	5	56	28	+28	59	Qualification for the Champions League third qualifying round (Note: On 18 June 2014, UEFA published the seeding ranking for the upcoming 2014-15 UEFA Champions League season, where FC Dnipro Dnipropetrovsk were pending approval of the UEFA Club Financial Control Body (CFCB) on 19 June 2014 to participate in the competition. The main issue that might have impeded Dnipro to participate in the continental competitions was the "Boateng case". The conflict arose during the 2012-13 season when Derek Boateng unsuccessfully tried to leave the club due to breach of contract and was forced to file a case against the club through the Court of Arbitration for Sport (CAS) in Lausanne. The end result was that Dnipro did play in the 2014-15 Champions League 3rd qualifying round (and, subsequently, the Europa League).)
3	Metalist Kharkiv	28	16	9	3	54	29	+25	57	Qualification for the Europa League play-off round
4	Dynamo Kyiv	28	16	5	7	55	33	+22	53	Qualification for the Europa League group stage (Note: FC Dynamo Kyiv qualified for the Group Stage of the 2014-15 Europa League as the 2013-14 Ukrainian Cup winner.)
5	Chornomorets Odesa	28	12	10	6	30	22	+8	46	Qualification for the Europa League third qualifying round

Source: uafootball.net.ua
Rules for classification: 1st points; 2nd goal difference; 3rd goals scored; 4th head-to-head points; 5th head-to-head goal difference; 6th head-to-head goals scored; 7th fair play rating
(C) Champions

=== Ukrainian Cup ===
25 September 2013 Round of 32	Illichivets Mariupol	0 – 3	Shakhtar Donetsk	Mariupol
20:30 EEST (UTC+3)	S.Yavorskiy (yellow card) 18'; Dovhyi (yellow card) 33'	Summary	Ilsinho 52'; Eduardo 82'; Luiz Adriano 88'	Stadium: Illichivets Stadium; Attendance: 5,700; Referee: Vitaliy Dyadenko

29 October 2013 Round of 16	MFC Mykolaiv	0 – 3	Shakhtar Donetsk	Mykolaiv
14:00 EEST (UTC+3)	A.Brynko (yellow card) 35'	Summary	Shynder (yellow card) 36'; Fernando 38'; Luiz Adriano 58'; Eduardo 66'	Stadium: Stadion Tsentralnyi; Attendance: 19,500; Referee: Andriy Lisakovskyi

26 March 2014 Quarter Final	Desna Chernihiv	0 – 2	Shakhtar Donetsk	Chernihiv
14:00 EEST (UTC+3)	Y.Kavatsiv (yellow card) 51'	Summary	Kobin 48' (yellow card) 65'; Eduardo 50'; Stepanenko (yellow card) 75'	Stadium: Chernihiv Stadium; Attendance: 14,150; Referee: Sergiy Skrypak

7 May 2014 Semi Final	Slavutych Cherkasy	0 – 3 (a.e.t.)	Shakhtar Donetsk	Cherkasy
16:00 EEST (UTC+3)	E.Ushakov (yellow card) 68'; O.Lobov (yellow card) 74'	Summary	Bernard (yellow card) 36' (goal) 120'; Ilsinho (yellow card) 39' (yellow-red card); Eduardo 105'; Taison 110'	Stadium: Tsentralnyi Stadion; Attendance: 10,300; Referee: Vitaliy Romanov

15 May 2014 Final	Dynamo Kyiv	2 – 1	Shakhtar Donetsk	Poltava
20:00 EEST (UTC+3)	Kucher 40' (o.g.); Vida 43'; Mbokani (yellow card) 45+3'; Yarmolenko (yellow card) 70' (yellow-red card); Vukojević (yellow card) 90+1'; Dragović (yellow card) 90+4'	Summary	Rakytskiy (yellow card) 31' (yellow-red card) 90+4'; Srna (yellow card) 45'; Douglas Costa 57'; Luiz Adriano (yellow card) 90+2'; Fred (yellow card) 90+4'	Stadium: Oleksiy Butovskyi Vorskla Stadium; Attendance: 9,700; Referee: Yuri Mozharovskiy

=== UEFA Champions League ===
==== Group stage ====
Pos	Team	Pld	W	D	L	GF	GA	GD	Pts	Qualification	MUN	LEV	SHK	RSO
1	(England) Manchester United	6	4	2	0	12	3	+9	14	Advance to knockout phase	—	4–2	1–0	1–0
2	(Germany) Bayer Leverkusen	6	3	1	2	9	10	−1	10	Advance to knockout phase	0–5	—	4–0	2–1
3	(Ukraine) Shakhtar Donetsk	6	2	2	2	7	6	+1	8	Transfer to Europa League	1–1	0–0	—	4–0
4	(Spain) Real Sociedad	6	0	1	5	1	10	−9	1		0–0	0–1	0–2	—

Source: UEFA

18 September 2013 1	Real Sociedad (Spain)	0 – 2	(Ukraine) Shakhtar Donetsk	San Sebastián, Spain
21:45 EEST (UTC+3)	Bergara (yellow card) 81'; Martínez (yellow card) 85'	Report	Teixeira (yellow card) 16' (goal) 65', 87'; Rakytskiy (yellow card) 44'; Luiz Adriano (yellow card) 45+1'; Douglas Costa (yellow card) 66'; Fernando (yellow card) 83'	Stadium: Anoeta; Attendance: 27,902; Referee: Ovidiu Hațegan (Romania); Man of the Match: Teixeira

2 October 2013 2	Shakhtar Donetsk (Ukraine)	1 – 1	(England) Manchester United	Donetsk, Ukraine
21:45 EEST (UTC+3)	Taison 76'	Report	Welbeck 18'; Fellaini (yellow card) 62'; Vidić (yellow card) 64'	Stadium: Donbas Arena; Attendance: 51,555; Referee: Pavel Královec (Czech Republic); Man of the Match: Vyacheslav Shevchuk

23 October 2013 3	Bayer Leverkusen (Germany)	4 – 0	(Ukraine) Shakhtar Donetsk	Leverkusen, Germany
21:45 EEST (UTC+3)	Kießling 22', 72' (yellow card) 60'; Donati (yellow card) 38'; Rolfes 50' (pen.); Sam 57'; Can (yellow card) 69'	Report	Srna (yellow card) 50'	Stadium: BayArena; Attendance: 25,184; Referee: Stéphane Lannoy (France); Man of the Match: Stefan Kießling

5 November 2013 4	Shakhtar Donetsk (Ukraine)	0 – 0	(Germany) Bayer Leverkusen	Donetsk, Ukraine
21:45 EET (UTC+2)	Ferreyra (yellow card) 71'; Teixeira (yellow card) 73'	Report	Bender (yellow card) 46'; Boenisch (yellow card) 61'; Can (yellow card) 75'	Stadium: Donbas Arena; Attendance: 50,115; Referee: Willie Collum (Scotland); Man of the Match: Bernd Leno

27 November 2013 5	Shakhtar Donetsk (Ukraine)	4 – 0	(Spain) Real Sociedad	Donetsk, Ukraine
21:45 EET (UTC+2)	Rakytskiy (yellow card) 16'; Luiz Adriano 37'; Teixeira 48'; Stepanenko (yellow card) 58'; Douglas Costa 68', 87'; Kucher (yellow card) 84'	Summary	Elustondo (yellow card) 34'	Stadium: Donbas Arena; Attendance: 44,348; Referee: Olegário Manuel Benquerenca (Portugal)

10 December 2013 6	Manchester United (England)	1 – 0	(Ukraine) Shakhtar Donetsk	Manchester, England
21:45 EET (UTC+2)	Jones 67'; Büttner (yellow card) 71'; Cleverley (yellow card) 77'	Summary	Srna (yellow card) 78'; Kucher (yellow card) 81'	Stadium: Old Trafford; Attendance: 75,000; Referee: Milorad Mažić (Serbia)

=== UEFA Europa League ===
==== Knockout phase ====
20 February 2014 Last 32 First Leg	Viktoria Plzeň (Czech Republic)	1 – 1	(Ukraine) Shakhtar Donetsk	Plzeň
22:05 EET (UTC+2)	Petržela (yellow card) 32'; Tecl 62'; Horváth (yellow card) 76'; Limberský (yellow card) 88'; Procházka (yellow card) 90+2'	Summary	Douglas Costa (yellow card) 34'; Hübschman (yellow card) 54'; Rakytskiy (yellow card) 58'; Luiz Adriano 64'	Stadium: Doosan Arena; Attendance: 11,179; Referee: Anastasios Sidiropoulos (Greece)

27 February 2014 Last 32 Second Leg	Shakhtar Donetsk (Ukraine)	1 – 2 (2 – 3 agg.)	(Czech Republic) Viktoria Plzeň	Donetsk, Ukraine
20:00 EET (UTC+2)	Ilsinho (yellow card) 57'; Kryvtsov (yellow card) 60'; Luiz Adriano (yellow card) 61' (goal) 88'	Summary	Kolář 29'; Petržela 33' (yellow card) 45+1'	Stadium: Donbas Arena; Attendance: 36,729; Referee: Pol van Boekel (Netherlands)

== Squad statistics ==
As of match played 18 May 2014

=== Appearances and goals ===
No.	Pos	Nat	Player	Total		Premier League		Ukrainian Cup		Champions League		Europa League		Supercup	
No.	Pos	Nat	Player	Apps	Goals	Apps	Goals	Apps	Goals	Apps	Goals	Apps	Goals	Apps	Goals
3	MF	(Czech Republic) CZE	Tomáš Hübschman	17	1	10+1	1	0	0	4	0	1	0	1	0
4	DF	(Ukraine) UKR	Oleksandr Volovyk	5	0	2+1	0	2	0	0	0	0	0	0	0
5	DF	(Ukraine) UKR	Oleksandr Kucher	26	1	13	1	4	0	6	0	2	0	1	0
6	MF	(Ukraine) UKR	Taras Stepanenko	26	2	15+2	2	4	0	2+1	0	1	0	0+1	0
7	MF	(Brazil) BRA	Wellington Nem	5	1	0+5	1	0	0	0	0	0	0	0	0
8	MF	(Brazil) BRA	Fred	31	4	14+8	2	3	0	3+1	0	1	0	1	2
9	FW	(Brazil) BRA	Luiz Adriano	39	25	24+1	20	2+3	2	5+1	1	2	2	1	0
10	MF	(Brazil) BRA	Bernard	28	3	7+10	2	3	1	2+4	0	1+1	0	0	0
11	FW	(Croatia) CRO	Eduardo	30	12	9+13	8	1+4	4	0+1	0	0+1	0	1	0
13	DF	(Ukraine) UKR	Vyacheslav Shevchuk	27	0	15+2	0	2	0	6	0	1	0	1	0
14	MF	(Ukraine) UKR	Vasyl Kobin	5	1	3	0	2	1	0	0	0	0	0	0
17	MF	(Brazil) BRA	Fernando	22	2	7+7	1	2+1	1	4+1	0	0	0	0	0
19	FW	(Argentina) ARG	Facundo Ferreyra	21	3	4+8	3	2	0	1+4	0	0+2	0	0	0
20	MF	(Brazil) BRA	Douglas Costa	39	7	25+2	4	2+1	1	6	2	2	0	1	0
27	DF	(Ukraine) UKR	Dmytro Chyhrynskyi	3	1	2	1	0	0	0	0	0	0	0+1	0
28	MF	(Brazil) BRA	Taison	31	4	15+3	1	3+1	1	4+2	1	1+1	0	1	1
29	MF	(Brazil) BRA	Alex Teixeira	39	7	26	4	3+1	0	6	3	2	0	1	0
30	GK	(Ukraine) UKR	Andriy Pyatov	27	0	16	0	3	0	6	0	2	0	0	0
31	DF	(Brazil) BRA	Ismaily	13	1	10	1	2	0	0	0	1	0	0	0
32	GK	(Ukraine) UKR	Anton Kanibolotskyi	15	0	12	0	2	0	0	0	0	0	1	0
33	DF	(Croatia) CRO	Darijo Srna	37	6	24+2	6	1+1	0	6	0	2	0	1	0
37	FW	(Ukraine) UKR	Anton Shynder	1	0	0	0	1	0	0	0	0	0	0	0
38	DF	(Ukraine) UKR	Serhiy Kryvtsov	23	2	17+1	2	3+1	0	0	0	1	0	0	0
44	DF	(Ukraine) UKR	Yaroslav Rakytskiy	31	0	22	0	1	0	6	0	1	0	1	0
77	MF	(Brazil) BRA	Ilsinho	23	1	8+5	0	4	1	2+3	0	1	0	0	0
89	MF	(Brazil) BRA	Dentinho	2	0	0+1	0	1	0	0	0	0	0	0	0
95	DF	(Ukraine) UKR	Eduard Sobol	9	0	3+5	0	1	0	0	0	0	0	0	0
Players away from the club on loan:
24	MF	(Ukraine) UKR	Dmytro Hrechyshkin	9	1	5+2	1	0+1	0	0	0	0	0	0+1	0
Players who appeared for Shakhtar who left the club during the season:
99	FW	(Brazil) BRA	Maicon	2	0	0+2	0	0	0	0	0	0	0	0	0

=== Goalscorers ===
Place	Position	Nation	Number	Name	Premier League	Ukrainian Cup	UEFA Champions League	UEFA Europa League	Super Cup	Total
1	MF	(Brazil)	9	Luiz Adriano	20	2	1	2	0	25
2	MF	(Croatia)	11	Eduardo	8	4	0	0	0	12
3	MF	(Brazil)	20	Douglas Costa	4	1	2	0	0	7
3	MF	(Brazil)	29	Alex Teixeira	4	0	3	0	0	7
5	DF	(Croatia)	33	Darijo Srna	6	0	0	0	0	6
6	MF	(Brazil)	8	Fred	2	0	0	0	2	4
6	MF	(Brazil)	28	Taison	1	1	1	0	1	4
8	MF	(Brazil)	10	Bernard	2	1	0	0	0	3
8	FW	(Argentina)	19	Facundo Ferreyra	3	0	0	0	0	3
10	DF	(Ukraine)	38	Serhiy Kryvtsov	2	0	0	0	0	2
10	MF	(Ukraine)	6	Taras Stepanenko	2	0	0	0	0	2
10	MF	(Brazil)	17	Fernando	1	1	0	0	0	2
13	MF	(Ukraine)	24	Dmytro Hrechyshkin	1	0	0	0	0	1
13	MF	(Brazil)	7	Wellington Nem	1	0	0	0	0	1
13	DF	(Ukraine)	5	Oleksandr Kucher	1	0	0	0	0	1
13	DF	(Brazil)	31	Ismaily	1	0	0	0	0	1
13	MF	(Czech Republic)	3	Tomáš Hübschman	1	0	0	0	0	1
13	DF	(Ukraine)	27	Dmytro Chyhrynskyi	1	0	0	0	0	1
13	MF	(Brazil)	77	Ilsinho	0	1	0	0	0	1
13	MF	(Ukraine)	14	Vasyl Kobin	0	1	0	0	0	1
13				Own goal	1	0	0	0	0	1
				TOTALS	62	12	7	2	3	86

=== Clean sheets ===
Place	Position	Nation	Number	Name	Premier League	Ukrainian Cup	UEFA Champions League	UEFA Europa League	Super Cup	Total
1	GK	(Ukraine)	30	Andriy Pyatov	8	2	3	0	0	13
2	GK	(Ukraine)	32	Anton Kanibolotskyi	5	2	0	0	0	7
				TOTALS	13	4	3	0	0	20

=== Disciplinary record ===
Number	Nation	Position	Name	Premier League		Ukrainian Cup		Champions League		Europa League		Super Cup		Total	
Number	Nation	Position	Name	Yellow card	Red card	Yellow card	Red card	Yellow card	Red card	Yellow card	Red card	Yellow card	Red card	Yellow card	Red card
3	(Czech Republic)	MF	Tomáš Hübschman	2	0	0	0	0	0	1	0	0	0	1	0
5	(Ukraine)	DF	Oleksandr Kucher	5	0	0	0	2	0	0	0	0	0	2	0
6	(Ukraine)	MF	Taras Stepanenko	5	0	1	0	1	0	0	0	0	0	2	0
8	(Brazil)	MF	Fred	5	0	1	0	0	0	0	0	0	0	1	0
9	(Brazil)	FW	Luiz Adriano	2	0	1	0	1	0	1	0	0	0	3	0
10	(Brazil)	MF	Bernard	1	0	1	0	0	0	0	0	0	0	1	0
11	(Croatia)	FW	Eduardo	2	0	0	0	0	0	0	0	0	0	1	0
13	(Ukraine)	DF	Vyacheslav Shevchuk	2	0	0	0	0	0	0	0	0	0	1	0
14	(Ukraine)	MF	Vasyl Kobin	0	0	1	0	0	0	0	0	0	0	1	0
17	(Brazil)	MF	Fernando	0	0	0	0	1	0	0	0	0	0	1	0
19	(Argentina)	FW	Facundo Ferreyra	0	0	0	0	1	0	0	0	0	0	1	0
20	(Brazil)	MF	Douglas Costa	1	0	0	0	1	0	1	0	0	0	2	0
27	(Ukraine)	DF	Dmytro Chyhrynskyi	2	0	0	0	0	0	0	0	0	0	1	0
28	(Brazil)	MF	Taison	2	0	0	0	0	0	0	0	0	0	1	0
29	(Brazil)	MF	Alex Teixeira	1	0	0	0	2	0	0	0	0	0	2	0
32	(Ukraine)	DF	Anton Kanibolotskiy	1	0	0	0	0	0	0	0	0	0	1	0
33	(Croatia)	DF	Darijo Srna	5	1	1	0	2	0	0	0	0	0	3	0
37	(Ukraine)	FW	Anton Shynder	0	0	1	0	0	0	0	0	0	0	1	0
38	(Ukraine)	DF	Serhiy Kryvtsov	1	0	0	0	0	0	1	0	0	0	1	0
44	(Ukraine)	DF	Yaroslav Rakytskiy	7	0	2	1	2	0	1	0	0	0	5	1
77	(Brazil)	MF	Ilsinho	3	0	2	1	0	0	1	0	0	0	3	1
Players away on loan:
Players who left Shakhtar Donetsk during the season:
			TOTALS	47	1	11	2	13	0	6	0	0	0	77	3
