= 2010–11 FC Shakhtar Donetsk season =

Shakhtar
2010–11 season
- Chairman: Rinat Akhmetov
- Manager: Mircea Lucescu
- Ground: Donbas Arena
- Ukrainian Premier League: 1st
- Ukrainian Cup: Winners
- Ukrainian Super Cup: Winners
- UEFA Champions League: Quarter-finals
- Top goalscorer: League: Luiz Adriano (10); All: Luiz Adriano (20)
- Highest home attendance: 51,579 vs Barcelona; 12 April 2011
- Lowest home attendance: 22,326 vs Kryvbas; 10 November 2010
- Average home league attendance: 36,281
Home colours	Away colours

The 2010–11 FC Shakhtar Donetsk season saw the club complete a domestic treble, winning their sixth Ukrainian Premier League, seventh Ukrainian Cup and third Ukrainian Super Cup. Shakhtar also competed in the UEFA Champions League, reaching the quarter-finals before being eliminated by Barcelona.

== Season events ==
On 6 July, Dmytro Chyhrynskyi returned to Shakhtar from Barcelona.

== Squad ==
As of match played 25 May 2011

Number	Name	Nationality	Position	Date of birth (age)	Signed from	Signed in	Contract ends	Apps.	Goals
Goalkeepers
12	Rustam Khudzhamov	(Ukraine)	GK	5 October 1982 (aged 28)	Kharkiv	2008		19	0
30	Andriy Pyatov	(Ukraine)	GK	28 June 1984 (aged 26)	Vorskla Poltava	2007		165	0
35	Yuriy Virt	(Ukraine)	GK	4 May 1974 (aged 37)	Metalurh Donetsk	2007			
45	Vyacheslav Bazylevych	(Ukraine)	GK	7 August 1990 (aged 20)	Academy	2007		0	0
60	Artem Tetenko	(Ukraine)	GK	12 February 1991 (aged 20)	Academy	2007		0	0
62	Mykyta Kryukov	(Ukraine)	GK	30 April 1991 (aged 20)	Academy	2008		0	0
Defenders
3	Tomáš Hübschman	(Czech Republic)	DF	4 September 1981 (aged 29)	Sparta Prague	2004		219	9
5	Oleksandr Kucher	(Ukraine)	DF	22 October 1982 (aged 28)	Metalist Kharkiv	2006		129	3
13	Vyacheslav Shevchuk	(Ukraine)	DF	13 May 1979 (aged 32)	Dnipro Dnipropetrovsk	2005		130	0
14	Vasyl Kobin	(Ukraine)	DF	24 May 1985 (aged 26)	Karpaty Lviv	2009		47	3
26	Răzvan Raț	(Romania)	DF	26 May 1981 (aged 29)	Rapid București	2003		273	12
27	Dmytro Chyhrynskyi (vice-captain)	(Ukraine)	DF	7 November 1986 (aged 24)	Barcelona	2010		158	13
32	Mykola Ishchenko	(Ukraine)	DF	9 March 1983 (aged 28)	Karpaty Lviv	2008		59	0
33	Darijo Srna (Captain)	(Croatia)	DF	1 May 1982 (aged 29)	Hajduk Split	2003		303	24
36	Oleksandr Chyzhov	(Ukraine)	DF	10 August 1986 (aged 24)	Vorskla Poltava	2008		29	0
38	Serhiy Kryvtsov	(Ukraine)	DF	15 March 1991 (aged 20)	Metalurh Zaporizhzhia	2010	2015	3	0
44	Yaroslav Rakitskyi	(Ukraine)	DF	3 August 1989 (aged 21)	Academy	2009		71	4
46	Oleskiy Chereda	(Ukraine)	DF	18 April 1994 (aged 17)	Academy	2008		0	0
49	Maksym Imerekov	(Ukraine)	DF	23 January 1991 (aged 20)	Academy	2008		0	0
51	Gennadi Klymenko	(Ukraine)	DF	3 November 1989 (aged 21)	Academy	2008		0	0
57	Yaroslav Oliynyk	(Ukraine)	DF	14 March 1991 (aged 20)	Academy	2008		0	0
	Mykhaylo Pysko	(Ukraine)	DF	19 March 1993 (aged 18)	UFK Lviv	2010		0	0
Midfielders
7	Fernandinho	(Brazil)	MF	4 May 1985 (aged 26)	Paranaense	2005		216	41
8	Jádson	(Brazil)	MF	5 October 1983 (aged 27)	Paranaense	2005		257	60
10	Willian	(Brazil)	MF	9 August 1988 (aged 22)	Corinthians	2007	2012	162	23
15	Taras Stepanenko	(Ukraine)	MF	8 August 1989 (aged 21)	Metalurh Zaporizhzhia	2010	2015	20	1
19	Oleksiy Hai	(Ukraine)	MF	6 November 1982 (aged 28)	Illichivets Mariupol	2000		191	19
20	Douglas Costa	(Brazil)	MF	14 September 1990 (aged 20)	Grêmio	2010	2015	57	12
22	Henrikh Mkhitaryan	(Armenia)	MF	21 January 1989 (aged 22)	Metalurh Donetsk	2010	2015	27	4
29	Alex Teixeira	(Brazil)	MF	6 January 1990 (aged 21)	Vasco da Gama	2010	2015	42	4
37	Bruno Renan	(Brazil)	MF	19 April 1991 (aged 20)	Villarreal	2010	2015	2	0
43	Oleksandr Batyshchev	(Ukraine)	MF	14 September 1991 (aged 19)	loan from Zorya Luhansk	2010	2011	0	0
52	Serhiy Semenyuk	(Ukraine)	MF	27 January 1991 (aged 20)	Academy	2008		0	0
64	Ruslan Kisil	(Ukraine)	MF	23 October 1991 (aged 19)	Academy	2008		0	0
65	Maksym Malyshev	(Ukraine)	MF	24 December 1992 (aged 18)	Academy	2005		0	0
67	Vyacheslav Churko	(Ukraine)	MF	10 May 1993 (aged 18)	Academy	2009		0	0
71	Serhiy Harashchenkov	(Ukraine)	MF	16 May 1990 (aged 21)	Academy	2007		0	0
90	Vitaliy Vitsenets	(Ukraine)	FW	3 August 1990 (aged 20)	Academy	2010	2015	24	2
Forwards
9	Luiz Adriano	(Brazil)	FW	12 April 1987 (aged 24)	Internacional	2007		127	51
11	Eduardo	(Croatia)	FW	25 February 1983 (aged 28)	Arsenal	2010	2014	33	12
48	Maksym Ilyuk	(Ukraine)	FW	10 November 1990 (aged 20)	Bukovyna Chernivtsi	2008		0	0
50	Vladyslav Kulach	(Ukraine)	FW	7 May 1993 (aged 18)	Academy	2010		0	0
54	Leonid Akulinin	(Ukraine)	FW	7 March 1993 (aged 18)	Academy	2009		0	0
58	Denys Pshenychny	(Ukraine)	FW	3 January 1989 (aged 22)	Academy	2008		0	0
59	Oleksandr Karavayev	(Ukraine)	FW	2 June 1992 (aged 18)	Academy	2005		0	0
63	Vladyslav Nekhtiy	(Ukraine)	FW	19 December 1991 (aged 19)	Academy	2008		0	0
68	Ivan Lukanyuk	(Ukraine)	MF	5 February 1993 (aged 18)	Academy	2010		0	0
99	Marcelo Moreno	(Bolivia)	FW	18 June 1987 (aged 23)	Cruzeiro	2008		44	10
Away on loan
1	Bohdan Shust	(Ukraine)	GK	4 March 1986 (aged 25)	Karpaty Lviv	2005			
23	Kostyantyn Kravchenko	(Ukraine)	MF	24 September 1986 (aged 24)	Dnipro Dnipropetrovsk	2008		25	9
24	Ruslan Fomin	(Ukraine)	FW	2 March 1986 (aged 25)	Arsenal Kharkiv	2005		30	5
77	Julius Aghahowa	(Nigeria)	FW	12 February 1982 (aged 29)	Kayserispor	2009		169	53
99	Leonardo	(Brazil)	DF	9 March 1986 (aged 25)	Santos	2005	2013		
	Mykyta Shevchenko	(Ukraine)	GK	26 January 1993 (aged 18)	Academy	2011		0	0
	Maksym Bilyi	(Ukraine)	DF	21 June 1990 (aged 20)	Academy	2007		0	0
	Bohdan Butko	(Ukraine)	DF	13 January 1991 (aged 20)	Academy	2008		0	0
	Artem Fedetskyi	(Ukraine)	DF	26 April 1985 (aged 26)	Kharkiv	2008		9	1
	Ihor Korotetskyi	(Ukraine)	DF	13 September 1987 (aged 23)	Academy	2004			
	Stanislav Mykytsey	(Ukraine)	DF	7 September 1989 (aged 21)	Academy	2005		1	0
	Ivan Ordets	(Ukraine)	DF	8 July 1992 (aged 18)	Academy	2009		0	0
	Serhiy Yavorskyi	(Ukraine)	DF	5 July 1989 (aged 21)	Academy	2006			
	Tornike Okriashvili	(Georgia (country))	MF	12 February 1992 (aged 19)	Gagra	2011		0	0
	Roman Yemelyanov	(Russia)	MF	8 May 1992 (aged 19)	Tolyatti	2010	2013	0	0
	Vitaliy Fedotov	(Ukraine)	MF	16 July 1991 (aged 19)	Academy	2008		0	0
	Vitaliy Hoshkoderya	(Ukraine)	MF	8 January 1988 (aged 23)	Academy	2004			
	Dmytro Hrechyshkin	(Ukraine)	MF	22 September 1991 (aged 19)	Academy	2008		0	0
	Yehor Kartushov	(Ukraine)	MF	5 January 1991 (aged 20)	Academy	2007			
	Maksym Kovalyov	(Ukraine)	MF	20 March 1989 (aged 22)	Academy	2005			
	Denys Kozhanov	(Ukraine)	MF	13 June 1987 (aged 23)	Academy	2005			
	Vladyslav Nasibulin	(Ukraine)	MF	6 July 1989 (aged 21)	Academy	2006			
	Oleksandr Noyok	(Ukraine)	MF	15 May 1992 (aged 19)	Academy	2009		0	0
	Oleksiy Polyanskyi	(Ukraine)	MF	12 April 1986 (aged 25)	Metalurh Donetsk	2006			
	Serhiy Shevchuk	(Ukraine)	MF	18 June 1985 (aged 25)	Systema-Borex Borodyanka	2003			
	Vladlen Yurchenko	(Ukraine)	MF	22 January 1994 (aged 17)	Academy	2010		0	0
	Nery Castillo	(Mexico)	FW	13 June 1984 (aged 26)	Olympiacos	2007	2012	18	2
	Pylyp Budkivskyi	(Ukraine)	FW	10 March 1992 (aged 19)	Academy	2009		0	0
	Oleksandr Kasyan	(Ukraine)	FW	27 January 1989 (aged 22)	Academy	2006			
Players who left during the season
21	Oleksandr Hladkyy	(Ukraine)	FW	24 August 1987 (aged 23)	Kharkiv	2007		124	38

=== Out on loan ===
Note: Flags indicate national team as defined under FIFA eligibility rules; some limited exceptions apply. Players may hold more than one non-FIFA nationality.

No.	Pos.	Nation	Player
—	GK	UKR	Mykyta Shevchenko (at Illichivets Mariupol)
—	GK	UKR	Bohdan Shust (at Illichivets Mariupol)
—	DF	BRA	Leonardo (at Avaí)
—	DF	UKR	Maksym Bilyi (at Stal Alchevsk)
—	DF	UKR	Bohdan Butko (at Volyn Lutsk)
—	DF	UKR	Artem Fedetskyi (at Karpaty Lviv)
—	DF	UKR	Ihor Korotetskyi (at Metalurh Donetsk)
—	DF	UKR	Stanislav Mykytsey (at Illichivets Mariupol)
—	DF	UKR	Ivan Ordets (at Illichivets Mariupol)
—	DF	UKR	Serhiy Yavorskyi (at Illichivets Mariupol)
—	MF	GEO	Tornike Okriashvili (at Illichivets Mariupol)
—	MF	RUS	Roman Yemelyanov (at Zorya Luhansk)
—	MF	UKR	Vitaliy Fedotov (at Illichivets Mariupol)
—	MF	UKR	Vitaliy Hoshkoderya (at Volyn Lutsk)
—	MF	UKR	Dmytro Hrechyshkin (at Illichivets Mariupol)

No.	Pos.	Nation	Player
—	MF	UKR	Yehor Kartushov (at Illichivets Mariupol)
—	MF	UKR	Maksym Kovalyov (at Zorya Luhansk)
—	MF	UKR	Denys Kozhanov (at Karpaty Lviv)
—	MF	UKR	Kostyantyn Kravchenko (at Illichivets Mariupol)
—	MF	UKR	Vladyslav Nasibulin (at Illichivets Mariupol)
—	MF	UKR	Oleksandr Noyok (at Zakarpattia Uzhhorod)
—	MF	UKR	Oleksiy Polyanskyi (at Zorya Luhansk)
—	MF	UKR	Serhiy Shevchuk (at Zorya Luhansk)
—	MF	UKR	Vladlen Yurchenko (at Illichivets Mariupol)
—	FW	NGR	Julius Aghahowa (at Sevastopol)
—	FW	MEX	Nery Castillo (at Aris)
—	FW	UKR	Pylyp Budkivskyi (at Illichivets Mariupol)
—	FW	UKR	Ruslan Fomin (at Zorya Luhansk)
—	FW	UKR	Oleksandr Kasyan (at Zorya Luhansk)

=== Coaching staff ===
Position	Name
Manager	Mircea Lucescu
Assistant manager	Alexandru Spiridon
Reserve team coach	Valeriy Yaremchenko
Goalkeeping coach	Marian Ioniță
Goalkeeping coach	Dmytro Shutkov
Physiotherapist	Carlo Nicolini
Fitness coach	Massimo Ugolini
Head of medical department	Paco Biosca
Club doctor	Artur Glushchenko
Match preparation manager	Ľuboš Micheľ
Kit manager	Damir Zinatulin
Chief scout	Luis Gonsalves
Head of youth development	Patrick van Leeuwen

== Transfers ==
=== In ===
Date	Position	Nationality	Name	From	Fee	Ref.
11 May 2010	DF	(Ukraine)	Serhiy Kryvtsov	Metalurh Zaporizhzhia	Undisclosed	
11 May 2010	MF	(Ukraine)	Taras Stepanenko	Metalurh Zaporizhzhia	Undisclosed	
6 July 2010	DF	(Ukraine)	Dmytro Chyhrynskyi	Barcelona	€15,000,000	
22 July 2010	FW	(Croatia)	Eduardo	Arsenal	Undisclosed	
30 August 2010	MF	(Armenia)	Henrikh Mkhitaryan	Metalurh Donetsk	$7,500,000	
31 August 2010	MF	(Brazil)	Bruno Renan	Villarreal	Undisclosed	
31 August 2010	MF	(Ukraine)	Vitaliy Vitsenets	Zorya Luhansk	Undisclosed	
1 January 2011	MF	(Georgia (country))	Tornike Okriashvili	Gagra	Undisclosed	

=== Loans out ===
Date From	Position	Nationality	Name	From	Date To	Ref.
1 July 2010	MF	(Georgia (country))	Tornike Okriashvili	Gagra	31 December 2010	

=== Out ===
Date	Position	Nationality	Name	To	Fee	Ref.
1 July 2010	DF	(Poland)	Mariusz Lewandowski	Sevastopol	Undisclosed	
1 July 2010	DF	(Ukraine)	Volodymyr Yezerskiy	Zorya Luhansk	Undisclosed	
1 July 2010	MF	(Brazil)	Ilsinho	São Paulo	Undisclosed	
1 July 2010	MF	(Serbia)	Igor Duljaj	Sevastopol	Undisclosed	
1 July 2010	DF	(Poland)	Mariusz Lewandowski	Sevastopol	Undisclosed	
17 August 2010	FW	(Ukraine)	Oleksandr Hladkyi	Dnipro Dnipropetrovsk	Undisclosed	

=== Loans out ===
Date From	Position	Nationality	Name	To	Date To	Ref.
1 July 2009	DF	(Ukraine)	Artem Fedetskyi	Karpaty Lviv	End of season	
1 February 2010	DF	(Brazil)	Leonardo Moura	Grêmio Barueri	31 December 2010	
1 July 2010	GK	(Ukraine)	Bohdan Shust	Zorya Luhansk	31 December 2010	
1 July 2010	DF	(Ukraine)	Bohdan Butko	Volyn Lutsk	End of season	
1 July 2010	DF	(Ukraine)	Ihor Korotetskyi	Metalurh Donetsk	End of season	
1 July 2010	DF	(Ukraine)	Stanislav Mykytsey	Zorya Luhansk	31 December 2010	
1 July 2010	DF	(Ukraine)	Serhiy Yavorskyi	Illichivets Mariupol	End of season	
1 July 2010	MF	(Ukraine)	Ihor Chaykovskyi	Zorya Luhansk	End of season	
1 July 2010	MF	(Ukraine)	Kostyantyn Kravchenko	Illichivets Mariupol	End of season	
1 July 2010	MF	(Ukraine)	Oleksiy Polyanskyi	Zorya Luhansk	End of season	
1 July 2010	FW	(Nigeria)	Julius Aghahowa	Sevastopol	End of season	
1 July 2010	FW	(Ukraine)	Yehor Kartushov	Zorya Luhansk	31 December 2010	
1 July 2010	FW	(Ukraine)	Oleksandr Kasyan	Zorya Luhansk	End of season	
23 July 2010	FW	(Mexico)	Nery Castillo	Chicago Fire	31 December 2010	
31 August 2010	MF	(Russia)	Roman Yemelyanov	Zorya Luhansk	31 December 2010	
31 August 2010	FW	(Ukraine)	Ruslan Fomin	Zorya Luhansk	31 December 2010	
1 January 2011	GK	(Ukraine)	Bohdan Shust	Illichivets Mariupol	End of season	
1 January 2011	DF	(Ukraine)	Stanislav Mykytsey	Illichivets Mariupol	End of season	
1 January 2011	DF	(Brazil)	Leonardo	Avaí	End of season	
1 January 2011	MF	(Georgia (country))	Tornike Okriashvili	Illichivets Mariupol	End of season	
1 January 2011	FW	(Ukraine)	Yehor Kartushov	Illichivets Mariupol	End of season	
19 January 2011	FW	(Mexico)	Nery Castillo	Aris	End of season	

== Competitions ==
=== Overall ===
Competition	First match	Last match	Starting round	Final position	Record							
Competition	First match	Last match	Starting round	Final position	Pld	W	D	L	GF	GA	GD	Win %
Premier League	10 July 2010	21 May 2011	Matchday 1	Champions	30	23	3	4	53	16	+37	76.67
Ukrainian Cup	22 September 2010	25 May 2011	Round of 32	Champions	5	5	0	0	13	1	+12	100.00
Super Cup	4 July 2010		Final	Champions	1	1	0	0	7	1	+6	100.00
UEFA Champions League	15 September 2010	12 April 2011	Group Stage	Quarterfinal	10	7	0	3	19	14	+5	70.00
Total					46	36	3	7	92	32	+60	78.26

Last updated: 25 May 2011
Source: Results

=== Super Cup ===
4 July 2010	Shakhtar	7 – 1	Tavriya	Zaporizhia
20:45 EEST (UTC+3)	Hladkyy 2', 51'; Raț (yellow card) 34', (goal) 90'; Jádson 35'; Hübschman (yellow card) 46'; Douglas Costa (yellow card) 65'; Willian 67'; Luiz Adriano 78', 86'	Summary	Feshchuk 32'; Kurilov (yellow card) 41'; Idahor (yellow card) 66'; Monakhov (yellow card) 81'	Stadium: Slavutych-Arena; Attendance: 10,000; Referee: Andriy Shandor

=== Premier League ===
==== League table ====
Pos	Team	Pld	W	D	L	GF	GA	GD	Pts	Qualification or relegation
1	Shakhtar Donetsk (C)	30	23	3	4	53	16	+37	72	Qualification to Champions League group stage
2	Dynamo Kyiv	30	20	5	5	60	24	+36	65	Qualification to Champions League third qualifying round
3	Metalist Kharkiv	30	18	6	6	58	26	+32	60	Qualification to Europa League play-off round
4	Dnipro Dnipropetrovsk	30	16	9	5	46	20	+26	57	Qualification to Europa League play-off round
5	Karpaty Lviv	30	13	9	8	41	34	+7	48	Qualification to Europa League third qualifying round

Source: uafootball.net.ua
Rules for classification: 1st points; 2nd goal difference; 3rd goals scored; 4th fair play
(C) Champions

==== Results summary ====
Overall								Home						Away					
Pld	W	D	L	GF	GA	GD	Pts	W	D	L	GF	GA	GD	W	D	L	GF	GA	GD
30	23	3	4	53	16	+37	72	13	1	1	31	4	+27	10	2	3	22	12	+10

Last updated: 21 May 2011.
Source: Results

==== Results by round ====
Round	1	2	3	4	5	6	7	8	9	10	11	12	13	14	15	16	17	18	19	20	21	22	23	24	25	26	27	28	29	30
Ground	H	A	H	A	H	H	A	H	A	H	A	H	A	H	A	A	H	A	H	A	A	H	A	H	A	H	A	H	A	H
Result	W	D	W	W	W	W	W	W	L	W	W	W	W	W	W	W	W	W	W	W	L	W	W	L	W	W	L	W	D	D
Position	2	5	2	3	2	1	1	1	1	1	1	1	1	1	1	1	1	1	1	1	1	1	1	1	1	1	1	1	1	1

Updated to match(es) played on 21 May 2011. Source: Results
A = Away; H = Home; W = Win; D = Draw; L = Loss

==== Results ====
10 July 2010 1	Shakhtar Donetsk	2 – 0	Kryvbas	Donetsk
19:00 EEST (UTC+3)	Rakytskiy 32'; Hübschman (yellow card) 83'; Willian 84'	Summary		Stadium: Donbas Arena; Attendance: 29,918; Referee: Yevhen Herenda

18 July 2010 2	Metalurh Zaporizhzhia	1 – 1	Shakhtar Donetsk	Zaporizhia
18:00 EEST (UTC+3)	Alozie 35'; Pisotskyi (yellow card) 56'	Summary	Fernandinho (yellow card) 65', (goal) 69'; Raț (yellow card) 75'; Hladkyy (yellow card) 90+3'	Stadium: Slavutych Arena; Attendance: 8,500; Referee: Volodymyr Sirenko

25 July 2010 3	Shakhtar Donetsk	1 – 0	Zorya Luhansk	Donetsk
19:00 EEST (UTC+3)	Kucher (red card) 29'; Jádson (yellow card) 58'; Chyhrynskyi 87'; Douglas Costa (yellow card) 90'	Summary	Bilyi (yellow card) 38'; Shukhovtsev (yellow card) 80'	Stadium: Donbas Arena; Attendance: 31,412; Referee: Anatoliy Abdula

30 July 2010 4	Arsenal Kyiv	1 – 3	Shakhtar Donetsk	Kyiv
18:00 EEST (UTC+3)	Symonenko 31'	Summary	Chyhrynskyi (yellow card) 27'; Srna (yellow card) 37'; Douglas Costa 44', 45+2'; Luiz Adriano 47', (yellow card) 57'	Stadium: Kolos Stadium; Attendance: 1,460; Referee: Yuriy Bakalov

7 August 2010 5	Shakhtar Donetsk	5 – 0	Sevastopol	Donetsk
19:00 EEST (UTC+3)	Fernandinho 26'; Jádson (yellow card) 37'; Eduardo 42'; Luiz Adriano 46'; Douglas Costa 60'; Moreno 73'	Summary	Zborovskyi (yellow card) 37'	Stadium: Donbas Arena; Attendance: 29,132; Referee: Volodymyr Golovko

15 August 2010 6	Shakhtar Donetsk	1 – 0	Karpaty Lviv	Donetsk
19:00 EEST (UTC+3)	Willian 45'; Raț (yellow card) 90+2'	Summary		Stadium: Donbas Arena; Attendance: 35,008; Referee: Oleg Derevynskiy

21 August 2010 7	Volyn Lutsk	0 – 1	Shakhtar Donetsk	Lutsk
19:00 EEST (UTC+3)	Buta (yellow card) 62'; Sharpar (yellow card) 71'	Summary	Kobin (yellow card) 19' (yellow-red card) 90'; Jádson (yellow card) 32'; Douglas Costa (yellow card) 65'; Eduardo 74'; Pyatov (yellow card) 90+2'	Stadium: Avanhard Stadium; Attendance: 11,520; Referee: Oleg Derevynskiy

29 August 2010 8	Shakhtar Donetsk	1 – 0	Illichivets	Donetsk
19:00 EEST (UTC+3)	Eduardo (yellow card) 56'; Willian 61'; Stepanenko (yellow card) 85'; Srna (yellow card) 89'	Summary	Kravchenko (yellow card) 30'; Tyschenko (yellow card) 54'; Savin (yellow card) 64'; Putivtsev (yellow card) 81'	Stadium: Donbas Arena; Attendance: 38,520; Referee: Vitaliy Godulyan

10 September 2010 9	Obolon	1 – 0	Shakhtar Donetsk	Kyiv
19:00 EEST (UTC+3)	Rybka (yellow card) 37'; Khudzik 51', (yellow card) 77'; Sapay (yellow card) 75'	Summary	Douglas Costa (yellow card) 10'; Fernandinho (yellow card) 11'; Willian (yellow card) 11'	Stadium: Obolon Stadium; Attendance: 4,900; Referee: Mykhailo Rodionenko

19 September 2010 10	Shakhtar Donetsk	4 – 1	Tavriya Simferopol	Donetsk
19:00 EEST (UTC+3)	Srna 14'; Luiz Adriano 62', (yellow card) 64'; Jádson 69', (yellow card) 84'; Mkhitaryan 72'; Raț (yellow card) 85'	Summary	Kovpak 5'; Holaydo (yellow card) 54'; Đuričić (yellow card) 59'; Gigiadze (yellow card) 90+2'	Stadium: Donbas Arena; Attendance: 32,017; Referee: Sergiy Lysenchuk

25 September 2010 11	Metalist Kharkiv	1 – 2	Shakhtar Donetsk	Kharkiv
17:30 EEST (UTC+3)	Obradović (yellow card) 43'; Taison 56'; Cleiton Xavier (red card) 86'	Summary	Rakytskiy (yellow card) 42'; Luiz Adriano (yellow card) 43'; Eduardo 72'; Kucher (yellow card) 75'; Raț (yellow card) 86'; Mkhitaryan 90+3'	Stadium: Metalist Stadium; Attendance: 38,500; Referee: Viktor Shvetsov

3 October 2010 12	Shakhtar Donetsk	2 – 0	Dynamo Kyiv	Donetsk
19:00 EEST (UTC+3)	Srna (yellow card) 56'; Luiz Adriano 64'; Rakytskiy (yellow card) 78'; Alex Teixeira 90+2'; Raț (yellow card) 90+3'	Summary	Eremenko (yellow card) 26'; Zozulya (yellow card) 29'; Vukojević (yellow card) 56'; Shevchenko (yellow card) 60'; El Kaddouri (yellow card) 74' (yellow-red card) 89'	Stadium: Donbas Arena; Attendance: 50,390; Referee: Andriy Shandor

15 October 2010 13	Metalurh Donetsk	0 – 2	Shakhtar Donetsk	Donetsk
19:30 EEST (UTC+3)		Summary	Chyhrynskyi 9'; Teixeira 19'	Stadium: Metalurh Stadium; Attendance: 5,000; Referee: Oleg Derevynskiy

23 October 2010 14	Shakhtar Donetsk	1 – 0	Vorskla	Donetsk
16:00 EEST (UTC+3)	Alex Teixeira 57', (yellow card) 47' (yellow-red card) 63'; Srna (yellow card) 68'	Summary	Januzi (yellow card) 22'; Peskov (yellow card) 43'; Yarmash (yellow card) 61'; Dallku (yellow card) 75'; Krasnopyorov (yellow card) 90+1'	Stadium: Donbas Arena; Attendance: 32,023; Referee: Evgen Aranovskiy

30 October 2010 15	Dnipro Dnipropetrovsk	0 – 1	Shakhtar Donetsk	Dnipropetrovsk
16:30 EET (UTC+2)	Seleznyov (yellow card) 9'	Summary	Luiz Adriano 26'; Willian (yellow card) 58'; Stepanenko (yellow card) 84'; Srna (yellow card) 84' (yellow-red card) 90+2'	Stadium: Dnipro Arena; Attendance: 31,003; Referee: Sergiy Boyko

6 November 2010 16	Kryvbas	0 – 2	Shakhtar Donetsk	Kryvyi Rih
16:00 EET (UTC+2)	Valeyev (yellow card) 6'; Kostyshyn (yellow card) 9'	Summary	Chyhrynskyi (yellow card) 39'; Eduardo 45+1', (yellow card) 84'; Stepanenko (yellow card) 66'; Raț (yellow card) 83'; Jádson 89'	Stadium: Metalurg Stadium; Attendance: 8,000; Referee: Oleksandr Derdo

13 November 2010 17	Shakhtar Donetsk	2 – 1	Metalurh Zaporizhzhia	Donetsk
16:00 EET (UTC+2)	Luiz Adriano 26' (pen.); Moreno 64'; Rakytskiy (yellow card) 70'	Summary	Teikeu (yellow card) 6'; Opanasenko (yellow card) 48'; Pisotskiy 71'	Stadium: Donbas Arena; Attendance: 29,219; Referee: Yuriy Moseychuk

20 November 2010 18	Zorya Luhansk	1 – 3	Shakhtar Donetsk	Luhansk
14:00 EET (UTC+2)	Xhihani 68'; Tesák (yellow card) 90'	Summary	Vitsenets 20'; Moreno 45'; Luiz Adriano 74'; Kucher (yellow card) 82'	Stadium: Avanhard Stadium; Attendance: 19,000; Referee: Genadiy Lysenchuk

28 November 2010 19	Shakhtar Donetsk	4 – 0	Arsenal Kyiv	Donetsk
16:00 EET (UTC+2)	Jádson 17' (pen.); Moreno 37'; Eduardo 62'; Douglas Costa 79' (pen.)	Summary	Matyukhin (yellow card) 79'; Bartulović (yellow card) 87'; Luhachov (yellow card) 89'	Stadium: Donbas Arena; Attendance: 29,103; Referee: Anatoliy Abdula

3 March 2011 20	Sevastopol	0 – 1	Shakhtar Donetsk	Simferopol
19:00 EET (UTC+2)	Ibraimi (yellow card) 45+2'; Shevelyukhin (yellow card) 60'; Lewandowski (yellow card) 90+4'; Aghahowa (yellow card) 90+5'	Summary	Willian (yellow card) 35'; Luiz Adriano 90+5'	Stadium: Lokomotiv Stadium (Tavriya); Attendance: 6,500; Referee: Sergiy Lysenchuk

13 March 2011 21	Karpaty Lviv	1 – 0	Shakhtar Donetsk	Lviv
16:00 EET (UTC+2)	Oshchypko (yellow card) 11'; Fedetskyi (yellow card) 18'; Cociș 58'; Khudobyak (yellow card) 68'; Tkachuk (yellow card) 76'; Bogatinov (yellow card) 90+2'	Summary	Stepanenko (yellow card) 40'; Rakytskiy (yellow card) 65'; Raț (yellow card) 88'	Stadium: Ukraina Stadium; Attendance: 27,000; Referee: Victor Shvetsov

20 March 2011 22	Shakhtar Donetsk	4 – 0	Volyn Lutsk	Donetsk
16:00 EET (UTC+2)	Jádson 42'; Mkhitaryan 69'; Teixeira 70'; Moreno 86'	Summary	Maksymyuk (yellow card) 40'; Pyschur (yellow card) 59'; Siminin (yellow card) 90+1'	Stadium: Donbas Arena; Attendance: 33,454; Referee: Dmitriy Kutakov

1 April 2011 23	Illichivets Mariupol	1 – 3	Shakhtar Donetsk	Mariupol
17:00 EEST (UTC+3)	Chaykovskyi (yellow card) 52'; Budkivskiy 57'	Summary	Srna 19'; Mkhitaryan (yellow card) 24'; Luiz Adriano 53', (yellow card) 68'; Fernandinho (yellow card) 73'; Willian (yellow card) 80'; Douglas Costa 90+4'	Stadium: Illichivets Stadium; Attendance: 10,500; Referee: Vitaliy Godulyan

9 April 2011 24	Shakhtar Donetsk	0 – 1	Obolon Kyiv	Donetsk
17:00 EEST (UTC+3)	Rakytskiy (yellow card) 16'; Douglas Costa (yellow card) 74'	Summary	Lupashko (yellow card) 21'; Panas (yellow card) 28' (yellow-red card) 61'; Slyusar (yellow card) 47'; Khudzik (yellow card) 54'; Kutas (yellow card) 56'; Kucherenko 86'	Stadium: Donbas Arena; Attendance: 26,031; Referee: Yuriy Moseychuk

17 April 2011 25	Tavriya Simferopol	1 – 2	Shakhtar Donetsk	Simferopol
16:00 EEST (UTC+3)	Shynder (yellow card) 25'; Humenyuk 69'; Graf (yellow card) 78'	Summary	Jádson 12'; Rakytskiy (yellow card) 28'; Fernandinho (yellow card) 90+2', (goal) 90+4'	Stadium: Lokomotiv Stadium (Tavriya); Attendance: 16,300; Referee: Oleg Derevinskyi

23 April 2011 26	Shakhtar Donetsk	2 – 1	Metalist Kharkiv	Donetsk
17:00 EEST (UTC+3)	Alex Teixeira 18' (yellow card) 41'; Eduardo (yellow card) 44', (goal) 87'; Rakytskiy (yellow card) 90'	Summary	Shelayev (yellow card) 36'; Valyayev (yellow card) 45'; Gueye (yellow card) 72'; Devich 77'; Taison (yellow card) 90'; Cristaldo (yellow card) 90+2'	Stadium: Donbas Arena; Attendance: 38,712; Referee: Yury Vaks

1 May 2011 27	Dynamo Kyiv	3 – 0	Shakhtar Donetsk	Kyiv
17:30 EEST (UTC+3)	Husyev 24', 90'; Yarmolenko (yellow card) 42'; Shevchenko 62'	Summary	Fernandinho (yellow card) 23'; Ischenko (yellow card) 27'; Srna (yellow card) 28'	Stadium: Lobanovsky Dynamo Stadium; Attendance: 15,000; Referee: Yuri Mozharovskiy

7 May 2011 28	Shakhtar Donetsk	2 – 0	Metalurh Donetsk	Donetsk
18:00 EEST (UTC+3)	Luiz Adriano 45+2'; Hübschman (yellow card) 73'; Srna 86'	Summary	Pryima (yellow card) 26'; Adeleye (yellow card) 80'	Stadium: Donbas Arena; Attendance: 28,541; Referee: Sergiy Boyko

14 May 2011 29	Vorskla Poltava	1 – 1	Shakhtar Donetsk	Kyiv
14:00 EEST (UTC+3)	Januzi 45+1', (yellow card) 90'; Dallku (yellow card) 47'; Krasnopyorov (yellow card) 90+3'	Summary	Vitsenets 17'; Chyzhov (yellow card) 51'; Kobin (yellow card) 80'; Stepanenko (yellow card) 90+1'	Stadium: Butovsky Vorskla Stadium; Attendance: 10,500; Referee: Anatoliy Abdula

21 May 2011 30	Shakhtar Donetsk	0 – 0	Dnipro Dnipropetrovsk	Donetsk
16:00 EEST (UTC+3)	Mkhitaryan (yellow card) 32'	Summary	Cheberyachko (yellow card) 62'; Denisov (yellow card) 69'; Mandzyuk (yellow card) 90'	Stadium: Donbas Arena; Attendance: 45,067; Referee: Igor Ishchenko

=== Ukrainian Cup ===
22 September 2010 Round of 32	Shakhtar Donetsk	6 – 0	Kryvbas	Donetsk
19:00 EEST (UTC+3)	Moreno 12'; Mkhitaryan 35'; Luiz Adriano 65', 67', 89'; Eduardo 84'	Report	Maksymov (yellow card) 56'	Stadium: Donbas Arena; Attendance: 23,808; Referee: Volodymyr Sirenko

27 October 2010 Round of 16	Poltava	0 – 2	Shakhtar Donetsk	Poltava
14:00 EET (UTC+2)	Kharchenko (yellow card) 33'	Report	Moreno 67'; Willian 72'	Stadium: Lokomotiv Stadium; Attendance: 2,500; Referee: Andriy Yablonskiy

10 November 2010 Quarterfinals	Shakhtar Donetsk	1 – 0	Metalurh Zaporizhzhia	Donetsk
19:00 EET (UTC+2)	Teikeu 14' (o.g.); Jádson (yellow card) 65'; Vitsenets (yellow card) 78'; Shevchuk (yellow card) 81'	Report	Hajduczek (yellow card) 13'; Tsiharow (yellow card) 45+1'; Arzhanov (yellow card) 76'	Stadium: Donbas Arena; Attendance: 22,326; Referee: Anatoliy Zhabchenko

11 May 2011 Semifinal	Shakhtar Donetsk	2 – 1	Dnipro	Donetsk
19:00 EEST (UTC+3)	Willian 15'; Teixeira 25', (yellow card) 33'; Srna (yellow card) 33'; Fernandinho (yellow card) 54'; Hübschman (yellow card) 65'	Report	Seleznyov (yellow card) 22' (red card) 84'; Rotan (yellow card) 33'; Laštůvka (yellow card) 33'; Hübschman 63' (o.g.); Konoplianka (yellow card) 75'	Stadium: Donbas Arena; Attendance: 34,357; Referee: Oleksandr Derdo

25 May 2011 Final	Dynamo Kyiv	0 – 2	Shakhtar Donetsk	Sumy
20:15 EEST (UTC+3)	Betão (yellow card) 73' (yellow-red card) 86'; Popov (yellow card) 83'; Milevskyi (yellow card) 89'; Aliyev (yellow card) 90+3'	Report	Eduardo 64', (yellow card) 70' (yellow-red card) 77'; Luiz Adriano 87'; Srna (yellow card) 89'; Fernandinho (yellow card) 90+1'	Stadium: Yuvileiny Stadium; Attendance: 27,800; Referee: Victor Svetsov

=== UEFA Champions League ===
==== Group stage ====
Pos	Team	Pld	W	D	L	GF	GA	GD	Pts	Qualification
1	(Ukraine) Shakhtar Donetsk	6	5	0	1	12	6	+6	15	Advance to knockout phase
2	(England) Arsenal	6	4	0	2	18	7	+11	12	Advance to knockout phase
3	(Portugal) Braga	6	3	0	3	5	11	−6	9	Transfer to Europa League
4	(Serbia) Partizan	6	0	0	6	2	13	−11	0	

Source: Soccerway

15 September 2010 1	Shakhtar Donetsk (Ukraine)	1 – 0	(Serbia) Partizan	Donetsk
21:45 EEST (UTC+3)	Srna (yellow card) 67', (goal) 71'	Summary	Boya (yellow card) 73'; Petrović (yellow card) 88'	Stadium: Donbas Arena; Attendance: 48,512; Referee: Carlos Velasco Carballo (Spain)

28 September 2010 2	Braga (Portugal)	0 – 3	(Ukraine) Shakhtar Donetsk	Braga
21:45 EEST (UTC+3)	Matheus (yellow card) 87'; Paulo César (yellow card) 90'	Summary	Raț (yellow card) 41'; Hübschman (yellow card) 51'; Luiz Adriano 56', 72'; Mkhitaryan (yellow card) 61'; Douglas Costa (yellow card) 89', (goal) 90' (pen.)	Stadium: Estádio Municipal de Braga; Attendance: 12,083; Referee: Kevin Blom (Netherlands)

19 October 2010 3	Arsenal (England)	5 – 1	(Ukraine) Shakhtar Donetsk	London
21:45 EEST (UTC+3)	Song 19'; Nasri 42'; Fàbregas 60' (pen.); Wilshere 66'; Chamakh 69'	Summary	Hübschman (yellow card) 58'; Luiz Adriano (yellow card) 58'; Eduardo 82'	Stadium: Emirates Stadium; Attendance: 60,016; Referee: Svein Oddvar Moen (Norway)

3 November 2010 4	Shakhtar Donetsk (Ukraine)	2 – 1	(England) Arsenal	Donetsk
21:45 EET (UTC+2)	Hübschman (yellow card) 27'; Chyhrynskyi 28'; Eduardo 45'; Gai (yellow card) 47'; Raț (yellow card) 83'	Summary	Walcott 10'; Eboué (yellow card) 27'	Stadium: Donbas Arena; Attendance: 51,153; Referee: Massimo Busacca (Switzerland)

23 November 2010 5	Partizan (Serbia)	0 – 3	(Ukraine) Shakhtar Donetsk	Belgrade
21:45 EET (UTC+2)	Smiljanić (yellow card) 39'; Babović (yellow card) 40'; Ilić (yellow card) 83'	Summary	Gai (yellow card) 32'; Stepanenko (yellow card) 48', (goal) 52'; Jádson 59'; Chyhrynskyi (yellow card) 67'; Eduardo 68'	Stadium: Stadion FK Partizan; Attendance: 17,473; Referee: Frank De Bleeckere (Belgium)

8 December 2010 6	Shakhtar Donetsk (Ukraine)	2 – 0	(Portugal) Braga	Donetsk
21:45 EET (UTC+2)	Raț 78'; Luiz Adriano 83'	Summary	Garcia (yellow card) 39'	Stadium: Donbas Arena; Attendance: 47,627; Referee: Felix Brych (Germany)

==== Knockout stage ====
16 February 2011 Round of 16 1st Leg	Roma (Italy)	2 – 3	(Ukraine) Shakhtar Donetsk	Rome
20:45 EET (UTC+2)	Raț 28' (o.g.); Menez 61', (yellow card) 75'; Cassetti (yellow card) 64'; Perrotta (yellow card) 77'	Report	Jádson 29'; Chyhrynskyi (yellow card) 34'; Douglas Costa 36'; Luiz Adriano 41', (yellow card) 61'; Rakytskiy (yellow card) 85'; Pyatov (yellow card) 88'	Stadium: Stadio Olimpico, Rome; Attendance: 35,873; Referee: Olegário Benquerença (Portugal)

8 March 2011 Round of 16 2nd Leg	Shakhtar Donetsk (Ukraine)	3 – 0 (6 – 2 agg.)	(Italy) Roma	Donetsk
20:45 EET (UTC+2)	Hübschman 18'; Mkhitaryan (yellow card) 28'; Srna (yellow card) 45+4'; Willian 58'; Eduardo 87'	Report	Mexès (yellow card) 23' (yellow-red card) 41'; Pizarro (yellow card) 57'; Perrotta (yellow card) 65'; Riise (yellow card) 82'	Stadium: Donbas Arena; Attendance: 46,543; Referee: Howard Webb (England)

6 April 2011 Quarterfinals 1st Leg	Barcelona (Spain)	5 – 1	(Ukraine) Shakhtar Donetsk	Barcelona
21:45 EEST (UTC+3)	Iniesta 2', (yellow card) 59'; Alves 34'; Piqué 53'; Keita 61'; Xavi 86'	Report	Raț (yellow card) 51'; Rakytskiy 60', (yellow card) 66'; Fernandinho (yellow card) 77'	Stadium: Camp Nou; Attendance: 71,657; Referee: Craig Thomson (Scotland)

12 April 2011 Quarterfinals 2nd Leg	Shakhtar Donetsk (Ukraine)	0 – 1 (1 – 6 agg.)	(Spain) Barcelona	Donetsk
21:45 EEST (UTC+3)	Mkhitaryan (yellow card) 56'; Ischenko (yellow card) 60'	Report	Messi 43'; Milito (yellow card) 71'	Stadium: Donbas Arena; Attendance: 51,579; Referee: Florian Meyer (Germany)

== Squad statistics ==
As of match played 25 May 2011

=== Appearances and goals ===
No.	Pos	Nat	Player	Total		Premier League		Ukrainian Cup		UEFA Champions League		Ukrainian Super Cup	
No.	Pos	Nat	Player	Apps	Goals	Apps	Goals	Apps	Goals	Apps	Goals	Apps	Goals
3	DF	(Czech Republic) CZE	Tomáš Hübschman	28	1	11+3	0	5	0	8	1	1	0
5	DF	(Ukraine) UKR	Oleksandr Kucher	18	0	8+2	0	4+1	0	3	0	0	0
7	MF	(Brazil) BRA	Fernandinho	20	3	14+1	3	2	0	0+2	0	1	0
8	MF	(Brazil) BRA	Jádson	38	8	19+5	5	3	0	8+2	2	1	1
9	FW	(Brazil) BRA	Luiz Adriano	37	20	13+8	10	3+2	4	10	4	0+1	2
10	MF	(Brazil) BRA	Willian	43	7	28	3	2+2	2	10	1	1	1
11	FW	(Croatia) CRO	Eduardo	33	12	14+8	6	1+2	2	1+7	4	0	0
12	GK	(Ukraine) UKR	Rustam Khudzhamov	4	0	1	0	3	0	0	0	0	0
13	DF	(Ukraine) UKR	Vyacheslav Shevchuk	16	0	10	0	5	0	1	0	0	0
14	DF	(Ukraine) UKR	Vasyl Kobin	14	0	9	0	2+1	0	1+1	0	0	0
15	MF	(Ukraine) UKR	Taras Stepanenko	20	1	14+1	0	0+2	0	2	1	0+1	0
19	MF	(Ukraine) UKR	Oleksiy Gai	18	0	9+2	0	1	0	6	0	0	0
20	MF	(Brazil) BRA	Douglas Costa	42	7	19+8	5	2+2	0	8+2	2	1	0
22	MF	(Armenia) ARM	Henrikh Mkhitaryan	27	4	12+5	3	1+2	1	6+1	0	0	0
26	DF	(Romania) ROU	Răzvan Raț	28	2	15+2	0	1	0	9	1	1	1
27	DF	(Ukraine) UKR	Dmytro Chyhrynskyi	21	3	16	2	0	0	5	1	0	0
29	MF	(Brazil) BRA	Alex Teixeira	39	4	9+17	3	3+1	1	1+7	0	0+1	0
30	GK	(Ukraine) UKR	Andriy Pyatov	42	0	29	0	2	0	10	0	1	0
32	DF	(Ukraine) UKR	Mykola Ischenko	14	0	8+2	0	2	0	2	0	0	0
33	DF	(Croatia) CRO	Darijo Srna	39	4	26+1	3	2	0	9	1	1	0
36	DF	(Ukraine) UKR	Oleksandr Chyzhov	9	0	6	0	2	0	0	0	1	0
37	MF	(Brazil) BRA	Bruno	2	0	0+1	0	1	0	0	0	0	0
38	DF	(Ukraine) UKR	Serhiy Kryvtsov	3	0	2	0	1	0	0	0	0	0
44	DF	(Ukraine) UKR	Yaroslav Rakitskiy	34	2	21	1	2	0	10	1	1	0
90	MF	(Ukraine) UKR	Vitaliy Vitsenets	21	2	5+9	2	3	0	0+4	0	0	0
99	FW	(Bolivia) BOL	Marcelo Moreno	23	7	10+8	5	2	2	0+3	0	0	0
Players away from Shakhtar Donetsk on loan:
17	FW	(Nigeria) NGR	Julius Aghahowa	1	0	0+1	0	0	0	0	0	0	0
23	MF	(Ukraine) UKR	Kostyantyn Kravchenko	2	0	0+2	0	0	0	0	0	0	0
Players that left Shakhtar Donetsk during the season:
21	FW	(Ukraine) UKR	Oleksandr Hladkyy	6	2	2+3	0	0	0	0	0	1	2

=== Goal scorers ===
Place	Position	Nation	Number	Name	Premier League	Ukrainian Cup	UEFA Champions League	Ukrainian Super Cup	Total
1	FW	(Brazil)	9	Luiz Adriano	10	4	4	2	20
2	FW	(Croatia)	11	Eduardo	6	2	4	0	12
3	MF	(Brazil)	8	Jádson	5	0	2	1	8
4	FW	(Bolivia)	99	Marcelo Moreno	5	2	0	0	7
4	MF	(Brazil)	20	Douglas Costa	5	0	2	0	7
4	MF	(Brazil)	10	Willian	3	2	1	1	7
7	MF	(Brazil)	29	Alex Teixeira	5	1	0	0	6
8	MF	(Armenia)	22	Henrikh Mkhitaryan	3	1	0	0	4
8	DF	(Croatia)	33	Darijo Srna	3	0	1	0	4
10	MF	(Brazil)	7	Fernandinho	3	0	0	0	3
10	DF	(Ukraine)	27	Dmytro Chyhrynskyi	2	0	1	0	3
12	MF	(Ukraine)	90	Vitaliy Vitsenets	2	0	0	0	2
12	DF	(Ukraine)	44	Yaroslav Rakytskiy	1	0	1	0	2
12	DF	(Romania)	26	Răzvan Raț	0	0	1	1	2
12	FW	(Ukraine)	21	Oleksandr Hladkyy	0	0	0	2	2
16	MF	(Ukraine)	15	Taras Stepanenko	0	0	1	0	1
16	DF	(Czech Republic)	3	Tomáš Hübschman	0	0	1	0	1
16				Own goal	0	1	0	0	1
				TOTALS	53	13	19	7	39

=== Clean sheets ===
Place	Position	Nation	Number	Name	Premier League	Ukrainian Cup	UEFA Champions League	Ukrainian Super Cup	Total
1	GK	(Ukraine)	30	Andriy Pyatov	16	1	5	0	22
2	GK	(Ukraine)	12	Rustam Khudzhamov	0	3	0	0	3
				TOTALS	16	4	5	0	25

=== Disciplinary record ===
Number	Nation	Position	Name	Premier League		Ukrainian Cup		UEFA Champions League		Ukrainian Super Cup		Total	
Number	Nation	Position	Name	Yellow card	Red card	Yellow card	Red card	Yellow card	Red card	Yellow card	Red card	Yellow card	Red card
3	(Czech Republic)	DF	Tomáš Hübschman	2	0	1	0	3	0	1	0	7	0
5	(Ukraine)	DF	Oleksandr Kucher	2	1	0	0	0	0	0	0	2	1
7	(Brazil)	MF	Fernandinho	4	0	2	0	1	0	0	0	7	0
8	(Brazil)	MF	Jádson	4	0	1	0	0	0	0	0	5	0
9	(Brazil)	FW	Luiz Adriano	4	0	0	0	2	0	0	0	6	0
10	(Brazil)	MF	Willian	4	0	0	0	0	0	0	0	4	0
11	(Croatia)	FW	Eduardo	3	0	2	1	0	0	0	0	5	1
13	(Ukraine)	DF	Vyacheslav Shevchuk	0	0	1	0	0	0	0	0	1	0
14	(Ukraine)	MF	Vasyl Kobin	3	1	0	0	0	0	0	0	3	1
15	(Ukraine)	MF	Taras Stepanenko	5	0	0	0	1	0	0	0	6	0
19	(Ukraine)	MF	Oleksiy Gai	0	0	0	0	2	0	0	0	2	0
20	(Brazil)	MF	Douglas Costa	4	0	0	0	0	0	1	0	5	0
22	(Armenia)	MF	Henrikh Mkhitaryan	2	0	0	0	3	0	0	0	5	0
26	(Romania)	DF	Răzvan Raț	7	0	0	0	3	0	1	0	11	0
27	(Ukraine)	DF	Dmytro Chyhrynskyi	2	0	0	0	2	0	0	0	4	0
29	(Brazil)	MF	Alex Teixeira	3	1	1	0	0	0	0	0	4	1
30	(Ukraine)	GK	Andriy Pyatov	1	0	0	0	1	0	0	0	2	0
32	(Ukraine)	DF	Mykola Ischenko	1	0	0	0	1	0	0	0	2	0
33	(Croatia)	DF	Darijo Srna	7	1	2	0	2	0	0	0	11	1
36	(Ukraine)	DF	Oleksandr Chyzhov	1	0	0	0	0	0	0	0	1	0
44	(Ukraine)	DF	Yaroslav Rakytskiy	7	0	0	0	2	0	0	0	9	0
90	(Ukraine)	MF	Vitaliy Vitsenets	0	0	1	0	0	0	0	0	1	0
Players away on loan:
Players who left Shakhtar Donetsk during the season:
21	(Ukraine)	FW	Oleksandr Hladkyy	1	0	0	0	0	0	0	0	1	0
			TOTALS	67	4	11	1	23	0	3	0	104	5
