= Rostyslav Bahdasarov =

Ukrainian footballer (1993–2021)

Personal information
- Full name: Rostyslav Ihorovych Bahdasarov
- Date of birth: 24 May 1993
- Place of birth: Donetsk, Ukraine
- Date of death: 13 March 2021 (aged 27)
- Place of death: Kyiv, Ukraine
- Height: 1.76 m (5 ft 9 in)
- Position: Defender

Youth career
- 2006–2010: Shakhtar Donetsk

Senior career*
Years	Team	Apps	(Gls)
2010–2014	Shakhtar Donetsk	0	(0)
2010–2013	→ Shakhtar-3 Donetsk	72	(3)
2015	Kolos Kovalivka	8	(0)
2015	Stal Dniprodzerzhynsk	1	(0)
2016	Kolos Kovalivka	23	(0)
2017	Juniors Shpytky (amateurs)	2	(0)
Total		106	(0)

International career
2008–2009	Ukraine-16	13	(2)
2009–2010	Ukraine-17	12	(0)
2010	Ukraine-18	4	(0)
- * Club domestic league appearances and goals

Rostyslav Bahdasarov (Ukrainian: Ростислав Ігорович Багдасаров; 24 May 1993 – 13 March 2021) was a Ukrainian footballer who played as a defender.

== Career ==
Bahdasarov was a product of the Shakhtar Donetsk youth team. He was forced to retire at the age of 24 due to heart problems in 2017.

He died aged of 27 on 13 March 2021.
