= Maicon (footballer, born May 1988) =

Brazilian footballer (1988–2014)

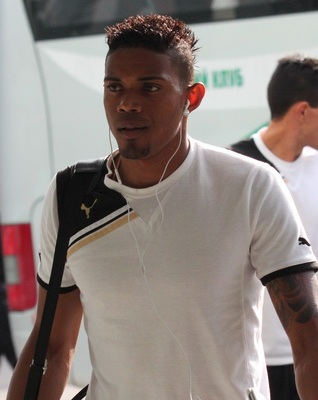
- Maicon in 2011

Personal information
- Full name: Maicon Pereira de Oliveira
- Date of birth: 8 May 1988
- Place of birth: Rio de Janeiro, Brazil
- Date of death: 8 February 2014 (aged 25)
- Place of death: Donetsk, Ukraine
- Height: 1.85 m (6 ft 1 in)
- Position: Forward

Youth career
- 2004–2006: Fluminense
- 2007–2008: Flamengo

Senior career*
Years	Team	Apps	(Gls)
2009	Atlético Mogi	0	(0)
2009–2012	Volyn Lutsk	57	(29)
2011	→ FCSB (loan)	6	(3)
2012–2014	Shakhtar Donetsk	6	(1)
2012	→ Zorya Luhansk (loan)	4	(0)
2013–2014	→ Illichivets Mariupol (loan)	10	(3)
Total		83	(36)
- * Club domestic league appearances and goals

Maicon Pereira de Oliveira (8 May 1988 – 8 February 2014) commonly known as Maicon, was a Brazilian professional footballer who played as a forward in the Ukrainian Premier League for most of his professional career.

== Career ==
=== Volyn Lutsk ===
Maicon was born in Rio de Janeiro, Brazil. In 2009, he moved to Ukrainian Premier League club Volyn Lutsk from Atlético Mogi. In his first season with the club he scored 13 goals in 18 matches in the First League (Persha Liha), guiding Volyn to promotion to the Premier League after a second-place finish. He made a further three cup appearances, however he failed to score a goal in them. In his second season, he was unable to keep up his scoring rate from the previous season and, despite netting a hat trick in the cup, he was loaned to Steaua București for the second half of the season. He scored 5 goals in 16 appearances in his second season with the club, including just 2 goals from 15 league matches.

==== Loan to Steaua ====
On 21 February 2011, Maicon was loaned out for four months to the Romanian team Steaua București with an option for purchase at the end of the 2010–11 Liga I season.

On 13 April 2011, in his second match at Steaua, he scored his first goal and the only goal in Steaua's victory against Liga I leader Oţelul Galaţi. On 16 April 2011, coming on in the 72nd minute, he scored the equalizer goal in 80th minute and victory goal in 86th minute against Sportul Studenţesc. At the end of the season, he returned to his club in Ukraine.

==== Return to Volyn ====
His second season in the Premier League proved much more successful. During the 2011–12 season, he scored 14 goals in the league and 5 in the cup and was the club's top goalscorer. He finished the season with 19 goals from 28 matches and was top goalscorer in the Ukrainian Cup. He also tied Yevhen Seleznyov as top goalscorer in the league. Due to an impressive 2011–12 season, he attracted the interest of reigning Premier League champions Shakhtar Donetsk, joining them on a free transfer.

=== Shakhtar Donetsk ===
In the summer of 2012, Maicon joined Shakhtar Donetsk on a free transfer. He signed a three-year contract. On 4 September it was announced that Maicon would join Zorya on loan for six months before joining up with Shakhtar again during the winter break.

==== Zorya Luhansk ====
Because he joined Shakhtar after the season had begun Mircea Lucescu, the Shakhtar manager, decided to loan him to Zorya for the first half of the season. But then he was registered by Ukrainian Premier League as a player, who belongs for Zorya, but not on loan. He made his debut on 15 September 2012, coming on as a second-half substitute against club Shakhtar Donetsk. Zorya lost the match 3–0.

== Death ==
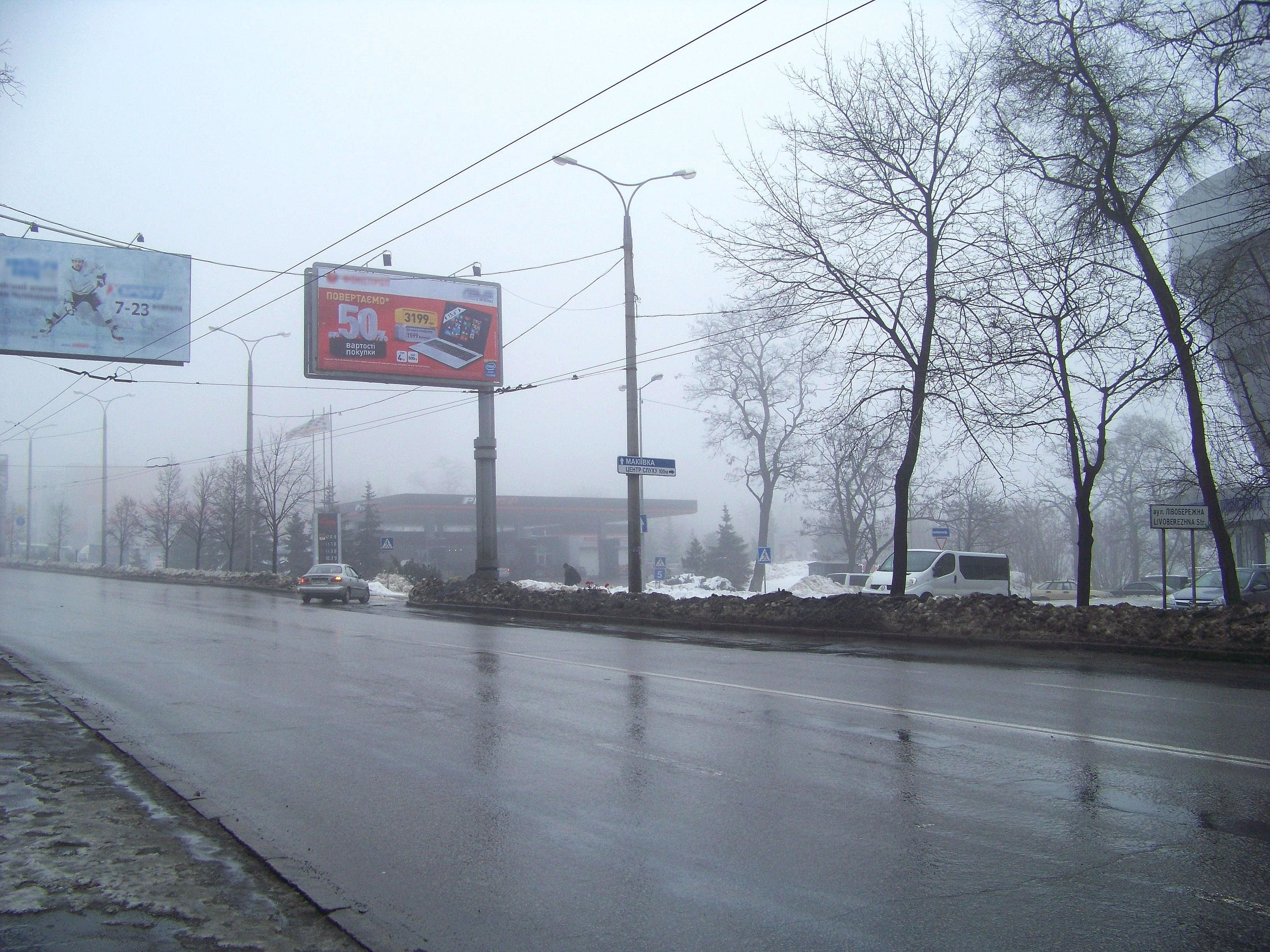
Location in Donetsk where the accident took place. The picture was taken on 10 February 2014. (2 days after the accident)

In February 2014, Illichivets Mariupol were conducting its winter training in Turkey where on 6 February it played the last friendly match against the Polish side Górnik Zabrze. Maicon spent the first half on the field, yet the Ukrainian team lost 2–1. This turned out to be Maicon's last game. On 7 February the team returned to Ukraine where it was given three days to rest. The next morning, on 8 February around 4 o'clock in the morning while returning home on his Hyundai Elantra near the Kalinin Hospital in Donetsk on prospekt Illicha (Illich Avenue), Maicon entered the ongoing traffic side of the street when maneuvering to pass a vehicle that signalled for a turn to the nearest gas station. While passing on the ongoing traffic lane, the footballer's vehicle made a head-on collision with a Škoda Superb, after which it hit a pole. With multiple injuries, the driver of the Škoda ended up in hospital in a critical condition, while Maicon died on the scene. A possible cause of death was injury to the skull as he hit a stand with his head. The automobile given to him had collided at a speed of 110 km/h (68 mph). Most likely, Maicon was returning from the night club "Litsa" (Russian: Лица) where he was seen with Alex Teixeira, Fred, and Douglas Costa. The club confirmed the news in an official statement that morning.

Shakhtar said that the Brazilian, 25, was a "wonderful person". "He was a talented footballer, open and friendly guy," the club added. "It is a terrible bereavement for each of us."

Maicon was on loan to Ukrainian league club Illichivets Mariupol until the end of the season. He joined Shakhtar Donetsk on a free transfer in 2012 from fellow Ukrainian side Volyn Lutsk and made six appearances, scoring one goal. Shakhtar said that his contract would be paid in full to his family as he had a 7-year-old daughter and elderly parents.
