= Yevhen Pisotskyi =

Ukrainian midfielder (born 1987)

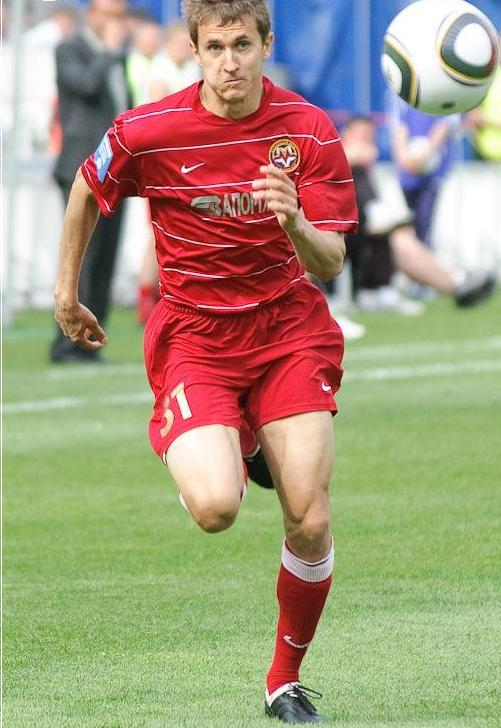

Personal information
- Full name: Yevhen Valeriyovych Pisotskyi
- Date of birth: 22 April 1987 (age 39)
- Place of birth: Zaporizhzhia, Ukrainian SSR
- Height: 1.82 m (5 ft 11 1/2 in)
- Position: Midfielder

Team information
- Current team: Metalurh Zaporizhzhia
- Number: 20

Youth career
- 2001–2004: Metalurh Zaporizhzhia

Senior career*
Years	Team	Apps	(Gls)
2004–2014	Metalurh Zaporizhzhia	145	(17)
2004–2006	→ Metalurh-2 Zaporizhzhia	23	(1)
2014–2015	Vorskla Poltava	0	(0)
2015	Illichivets Mariupol	0	(0)
2015	Zaria Bălți	7	(2)
2018–	Metalurh Zaporizhzhia	1	(0)

International career^{‡}
2002	Ukraine-15	2	(0)
2002	Ukraine-16	5	(0)
2004	Ukraine-17	2	(0)
2005	Ukraine-18	13	(3)
2005	Ukraine-19	4	(0)
- * Club domestic league appearances and goals as of 14 August 2018 ‡ National team caps and goals as of 14 August 2018

Yevhen Pisotskyi (Ukrainian: Євген Валерійович Пісоцький; born 22 April 1987 in Zaporizhzhia, Ukrainian SSR) is a Ukrainian midfielder who plays for Metalurh Zaporizhzhia.

== Career ==
Pisotskyi began playing football for the youth sides of FC Metalurh Zaporizhzhya. He joined the senior side, and scored his first Ukrainian Premier League goal in March 2010.
