= Bruno Renan =

Brazilian footballer (born 1991)

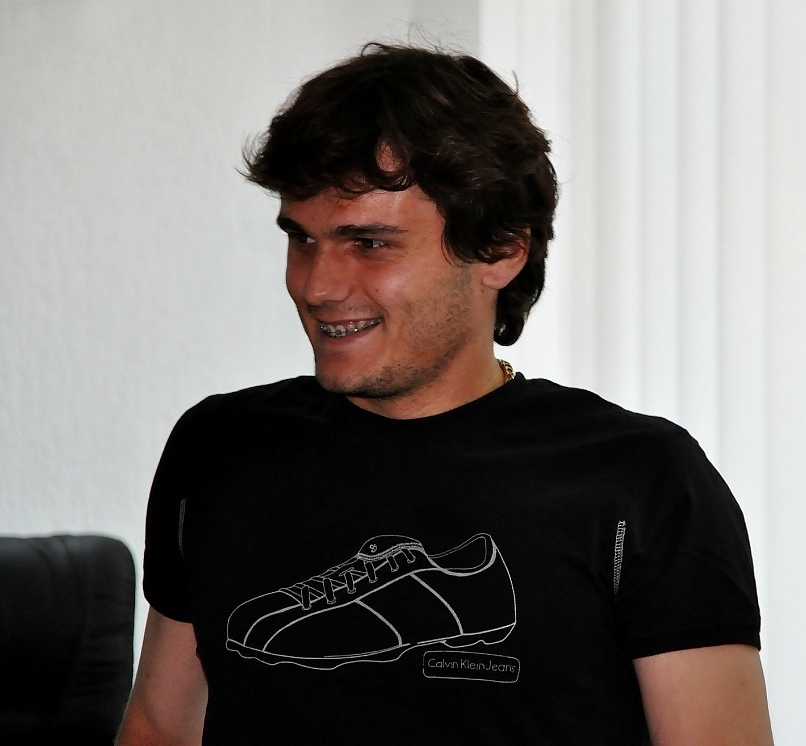

Personal information
- Full name: Bruno Renan Trombelli
- Date of birth: April 19, 1991 (age 35)
- Place of birth: Maringá, Brazil
- Height: 1.77 m (5 ft 9 1/2 in)
- Position: Midfielder

Team information
- Current team: 3 de Febrero

Youth career
- 2005–2009: Grêmio

Senior career*
Years	Team	Apps	(Gls)
2009–2010	Villarreal	0	(0)
2009	Villarreal B	1	(0)
2009–2010	→ Grêmio (loan)	0	(0)
2010–2014	Shakhtar Donetsk	1	(0)
2011–2012	→ Zorya Luhansk (loan)	8	(0)
2013–2014	→ Criciúma (loan)	9	(0)
2014	Pelotas	5	(0)
2015	Maringá	7	(0)
2016	América de Natal	9	(0)
2017	Rio Branco	1	(0)
2018–	3 de Febrero	18	(0)

International career^{‡}
2009	Brazil U18	1	(0)
- * Club domestic league appearances and goals as of November 30, 2018 ‡ National team caps and goals as of November 30, 2018

Bruno Renan Trombelli (born April 19, 1991) or simply Bruno Renan is a Brazilian defensive midfielder who currently plays for 3 de Febrero in the Primera División Paraguaya.

== Career ==
=== Grêmio ===
Born in Maringá, Bruno Renan joined the Grêmio youth academy in 2005, aged 14. He was sold to Villarreal C.F. alongside Tiago Dutra for around £1.8 million, without playing a single match for the senior team. The club still owns 20% of his rights. He also attracted interest from Chelsea.

=== Villarreal ===
After featuring in pre-season friendlies with the first team, Renan moved to Villarreal B to play in the Segunda División. However, with the full three non-EU quota fulfilled, Renan moved back to Grêmio on a two-year loan deal.

=== Shakhtar Donetsk ===
On August 31, 2010 Bruno moved to Shakhtar Donetsk in a five-year deal. He made his debut for the club in 2-0 away victory over Poltava in the Ukrainian Cup, coming off after 59 minutes for Luiz Adriano. His league debut came in a 1-1 draw with Vorskla Poltava, as a 73rd minute replacement for Douglas Costa.

=== Return to Brazil ===
After spells at Pelotas, Maringá and América de Natal, Renan joined Paranaguá side Rio Branco for 2017.

=== 3 de Febrero ===
The player joins the '3' of Ciudad del Este in December 2017.

== Career statistics ==
As of match played 30 November 2018

Appearances and goals by club, season and competition
Club	Season	League			Cup		Continental		Other		Total	
Club	Season	Division	Apps	Goals	Apps	Goals	Apps	Goals	Apps	Goals	Apps	Goals
Villarreal B	2009–10	Segunda División	1	0	0	0	0	0	0	0	1	0
Villarreal B	Total		1	0	0	0	0	0	0	0	1	0
Shakhtar Donetsk	2010–11	Ukrainian Premier League	1	0	1	0	0	0	0	0	2	0
Shakhtar Donetsk	Total		1	0	1	0	0	0	0	0	2	0
Zorya Luhansk (loan)	2011–12	Ukrainian Premier League	8	0	0	0	0	0	0	0	8	0
Zorya Luhansk (loan)	Total		8	0	0	0	0	0	0	0	8	0
Criciúma (loan)	2013	Série A	9	0	2	0	2	0	0	0	13	0
Criciúma (loan)	Total		9	0	2	0	2	0	0	0	13	0
Pelotas	2014	Série D	5	0	0	0	0	0	0	0	5	0
Pelotas	Total		5	0	0	0	0	0	0	0	5	0
Maringá	2015	Campeonato Paranaense	0	0	0	0	0	0	7	0	7	0
Maringá	Total		0	0	0	0	0	0	7	0	7	0
América de Natal	2016	Série C	9	0	0	0	0	0	0	0	9	0
América de Natal	Total		9	0	0	0	0	0	0	0	9	0
Rio Branco	2017	Campeonato Paranaense	0	0	0	0	0	0	1	0	1	0
Rio Branco	Total		0	0	0	0	0	0	1	0	1	0
3 de Febrero	2018	Primera División	18	0	0	0	0	0	0	0	18	0
3 de Febrero	Total		18	0	0	0	0	0	0	0	18	0
Career total			51	0	3	0	2	0	8	0	64	0

== International ==
Bruno Renan was an international for the Brazil under-18 national team.

== Honours ==
Grêmio

- Campeonato Brasileiro Sub-20: 2008
