= Vladyslav Nasibulin =

Ukrainian footballer

Personal information
- Full name: Vladyslav Olehovych Nasibulin
- Date of birth: 6 July 1989 (age 37)
- Place of birth: Debaltseve, Donetsk Oblast, Ukrainian SSR
- Height: 1.74 m (5 ft 8 1/2 in)
- Position: Midfielder

Youth career
- 2003–2005: Metalurh Donetsk
- 2005–2006: Shakhtar Donetsk

Senior career*
Years	Team	Apps	(Gls)
2006–2013	Shakhtar Donetsk	0	(0)
2006–2009	→ Shakhtar-3 Donetsk	69	(12)
2010–2011	→ Illichivets Mariupol (loan)	13	(0)
2012–2013	→ Zirka Kirovohrad (loan)	26	(6)
2013–2018	Poltava	129	(24)
2018–2020	Minsk	53	(7)
2021	Hirnyk-Sport Horishni Plavni	3	(0)
2021–2023	Olimpiya Savyntsi		

International career^{‡}
2005	Ukraine U17	1	(0)
- * Club domestic league appearances and goals as of 15 June 2021 ‡ National team caps and goals as of 22 June 2018

Vladyslav Nasibulin (Ukrainian: Владислав Олегович Насібулін; born 6 July 1989) is a Ukrainian professional footballer who plays as a defender.

== Career ==
He is product of FC Metalurh Donetsk and FC Shakhtar Donetsk sport schools.

Nasibulin was loaned to FC Illichivets Mariupol in Ukrainian Premier League from 6 June 2010.
