= Anton Shynder =

Ukrainian footballer

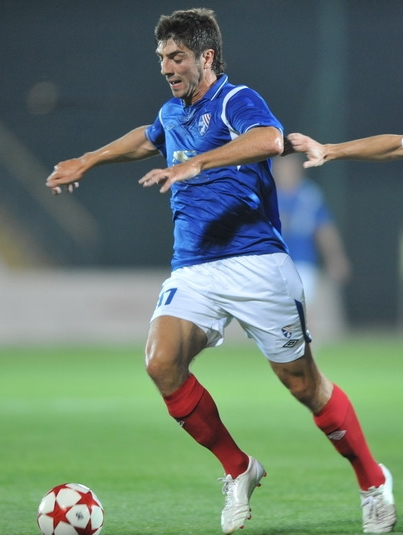

Personal information
- Full name: Anton Pavlovych Shynder
- Date of birth: 13 June 1987 (age 39)
- Place of birth: Sumy, Ukrainian SSR
- Height: 1.85 m (6 ft 1 in)
- Position: Forward

Team information
- Current team: DJK Ammerthal
- Number: 11

Youth career
- 2000–2002: Zmina Sumy

Senior career*
Years	Team	Apps	(Gls)
2005–2006	Jahn Regensburg	2	(0)
2006	Shakhtar Donetsk	0	(0)
2006	→ Shakhtar-3 Donetsk	5	(1)
2006–2008	Greuther Fürth	0	(0)
2006–2008	→ Greuther Fürth II	47	(20)
2008–2009	Aalen	14	(0)
2009–2010	Jahn Regensburg	29	(1)
2010–2013	Tavriya Simferopol	82	(18)
2013–2016	Shakhtar Donetsk	0	(0)
2014	→ Chornomorets Odesa (loan)	7	(0)
2015–2016	→ Vorskla Poltava (loan)	32	(12)
2016–2017	Amkar Perm	8	(0)
2018	Tobol	6	(3)
2018	Kisvárda	2	(0)
2018–2019	Olimpik Donetsk	9	(1)
2019–2020	SC 04 Schwabach	20	(12)
2020–2021	Mynai	20	(3)
2021–2022	SC 04 Schwabach	20	(10)
2022–	DJK Ammerthal	2	(1)

International career
2006	Ukraine-19	2	(0)
2011–2012	Ukraine	2	(0)
- * Club domestic league appearances and goals as of 23 November 2022

Anton Pavlovych Shynder (Ukrainian: Антон Павлович Шиндер; born 13 June 1987) is a Ukrainian footballer who plays as a forward for German club DJK Ammerthal.

== Club career ==
Shynder's move to Shakhtar Donetsk in 2013 was of little benefit to the player as he failed to see a single minute of Ukrainian Premier League action. He made just one appearance for Shakhtar (coming against MFK Mykolaiv) in the Ukrainian Cup.

In February 2015, after a loan spell at Chornomorets Odesa, Shynder joined Vorskla Poltava.

On 7 August 2017, he was released from his contract by Amkar Perm.

On 8 June 2018, Shynder was released from his FC Tobol contract, signing for Kisvárda the following day.

On 11 August 2018 against Ferencváros Shynder was sent off for yelling at the referee from close distance after being booked for a foul. He was subsequently directed by his club to train with the reserves. On 15 August, the Hungarian Football Federation banned him for four months from every soccer related activity which also included organized team trainings. As a consequence, Kisvárda terminated his contract with 30 August 2018.

== International ==
On 6 September 2011, Shynder made his debut for the senior national team of his country in the 0–4 loss against the Czech Republic in a friendly match.
