= Mykyta Kryukov =

Ukrainian footballer

Personal information
- Full name: Mykyta Oleksiyovych Kryukov
- Date of birth: 30 April 1991 (age 35)
- Place of birth: Donetsk, Ukrainian SSR
- Height: 1.97 m (6 ft 5 1/2 in)
- Position: Goalkeeper

Team information
- Current team: 1. FC Viersen

Youth career
- 2004–2008: Shakhtar Donetsk

Senior career*
| Years | Team | Apps | (Gls) |
| 2008–2015 | Shakhtar Donetsk | 0 | (0) |
| 2008–2010 | → Shakhtar-3 Donetsk | 27 | (0) |
| 2015–2016 | Illichivets Mariupol | 1 | (0) |
| 2016–2017 | Hirnyk-Sport Komsomolsk | 11 | (0) |
| 2018 | Krystal Kherson | 17 | (0) |
| 2019 | Mykolaiv | 5 | (0) |
| 2019 | → Mykolaiv-2 | 12 | (0) |
| 2020 | Rubin Yalta | 5 | (0) |
| 2021 | FC Yalta | | |
| 2022–2023 | Red Stars Mönchengladbach | | |
| 2023– | 1. FC Viersen | | |

International career^{‡}
| 2011 | Ukraine U21 | 1 | (0) |
- * Club domestic league appearances and goals as of 21 January 2020 ‡ National team caps and goals as of 5 October 2016

Mykyta Kryukov (Ukrainian: Микита Олексійович Крюков, born 30 April 1991) is a Ukrainian football goalkeeper who plays for 1. FC Viersen.

== Career ==
Kryukov played one match for Ukrainian national youth football squad. He was called up as member of the Ukraine national under-21 football team by coach Pavlo Yakovenko in March 2011, and played one game.

Made his debut for FC Illichivets in the game against FC Shakhtar Donetsk on 5 April 2015 in the Ukrainian Premier League.
