= Vitaliy Vitsenets =

Ukrainian footballer (born 1990)

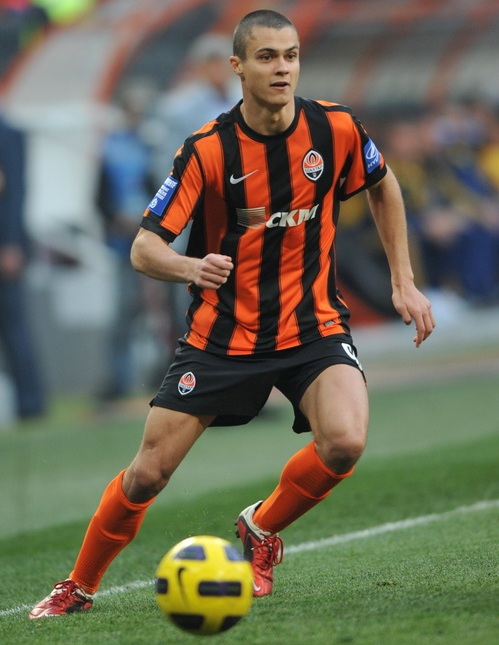

Personal information
- Full name: Vitaliy Volodymyrovych Vitsenets
- Date of birth: 3 August 1990 (age 36)
- Place of birth: Pershotravensk, Ukrainian SSR
- Height: 1.82 m (5 ft 11 1/2 in)
- Position: Striker

Team information
- Current team: Torpedo Moscow (analyst coach)

Youth career
- 2002–2007: Shakhtar Donetsk

Senior career*
Years	Team	Apps	(Gls)
2007–2010	Shakhtar Donetsk	2	(0)
2007–2009	→ Shakhtar-3 Donetsk	18	(1)
2010	Zorya Luhansk	7	(2)
2010–2016	Shakhtar Donetsk	14	(2)
2011–2013	→ Illichivets Mariupol (loan)	28	(2)
2013	→ Sevastopol (loan)	9	(1)
2014	→ Illichivets Mariupol (loan)	0	(0)
2017	Mariupol	8	(0)
Total		86	(8)

International career
2006–2007	Ukraine-17	14	(0)
2007–2008	Ukraine-18	13	(0)
2008–2009	Ukraine-19	8	(0)
2009–2012	Ukraine-21	15	(0)

Managerial career
- 2018–2021: Shakhtar Donetsk (academy)
- 2021–2022: Kryvbas Kryvyi Rih (U19)
- 2022–2023: Arsenal Tula (assistant)
- 2023–2024: Zvezda St. Petersburg (assistant)
- 2024–2025: Spartak-2 Moscow (assistant)
- 2025: Saturn Ramenskoye
- 2025–: Torpedo Moscow (analyst)
Medal record
Men's football
Representing Ukraine
UEFA European Under-19 Championship
Winner	2009 Ukraine
- * Club domestic league appearances and goals

Vitaliy Volodymyrovych Vitsenets (Ukrainian: Віталій Володимирович Віценець; born 3 August 1990) is a Ukrainian football coach and a former midfielder. He is an analyst coach with Russian club Torpedo Moscow.

== Career ==
A native of west Donbas, Vitsenets is a product of the Shakhtar Donetsk academy. He played as a striker for Shakhtar. He was also a member of the Ukraine national under-19 football team, and winner of UEFA European Under-19 Championship in 2009.

After his knee injury received in 2013, Vitsenets became a victim of a doctor's mistake when he had his whole lateral meniscus removed. Following series of surgeries in Spain, Vitsenets for the next couple of years was preoccupied with rehabilitation. In January 2016 he tried to return to football by participating at FC Oleksandriya trials, but again had problems with his knee.

In July 2016 he retired from professional football career, but one year later, in July 2017, he renewed it and signed one-year deal with FC Mariupol.

He wasn't able to overcome his knee injury and after the ending of first half of 2017–18 season in FC Mariupol retired for the second time.
