= 2009 UEFA Super Cup =

Barcelona	Shakhtar Donetsk
(Spain)	(Ukraine)
1	0
- After extra time
- Date: 28 August 2009
- Venue: Stade Louis II, Monaco
- Referee: Frank De Bleeckere (Belgium)
- Attendance: 17,738
- Weather: Clear night 28 °C (82 °F); 56% humidity

The 2009 UEFA Super Cup was the 34th UEFA Super Cup, an annual football match between the winners of the previous season's UEFA Champions League and UEFA Cup competitions. The match was contested by 2008–09 UEFA Champions League winners, Barcelona, and 2008–09 UEFA Cup winners, Shakhtar Donetsk at the Stade Louis II in Monaco on 28 August 2009, following the UEFA Champions League and Europa League draws at the Grimaldi Forum.

This was the first meeting between the two sides since they met in Group C of the previous season's Champions League competition.

== Venue ==
The Stade Louis II in Monaco has been the venue for the UEFA Super Cup every year since 1998. Built in 1985, the stadium is also the home of AS Monaco, who play in the French league system.

== Teams ==
Team	Qualification	Previous participation (bold indicates winners)
(Spain) Barcelona	2008–09 UEFA Champions League winners	1979, 1982, 1989, **1992**, **1997**, 2006
(Ukraine) Shakhtar Donetsk	2008–09 UEFA Cup winners	None

== Match ==
=== Details ===
28 August 2009
20:45 CEST

Barcelona (Spain)	1–0 (a.e.t.)	(Ukraine) Shakhtar Donetsk
Pedro 115'	Report

Stade Louis II, Monaco
Attendance: 17,738
Referee: Frank De Bleeckere (Belgium)

**Barcelona**	**Shakhtar Donetsk**

GK	1	(Spain) Víctor Valdés
RB	2	(Brazil) Dani Alves
CB	5	(Spain) Carles Puyol (c)
CB	3	(Spain) Gerard Piqué
LB	22	(France) Eric Abidal
DM	24	(Ivory Coast) Yaya Touré		(substituted off) 100'
CM	6	(Spain) Xavi
CM	15	(Mali) Seydou Keita
RW	10	(Argentina) Lionel Messi	(yellow card) 90+3'
LW	14	(France) Thierry Henry		(substituted off) 96'
CF	9	(Sweden) Zlatan Ibrahimović		(substituted off) 81'
Substitutes:
GK	13	(Spain) José Manuel Pinto
DF	19	(Brazil) Maxwell
DF	33	(Spain) Marc Muniesa
MF	16	(Spain) Sergio Busquets		(substituted on) 100'
FW	7	(Iceland) Eiður Guðjohnsen
FW	11	(Spain) Bojan Krkić		(substituted on) 96'
FW	17	(Spain) Pedro	(yellow card) 107'	(substituted on) 81'
Manager:
(Spain) Pep Guardiola

GK	30	(Ukraine) Andriy Pyatov
RB	33	(Croatia) Darijo Srna (c)	(yellow card) 65'
CB	5	(Ukraine) Oleksandr Kucher	(yellow card) 90+3'
CB	27	(Ukraine) Dmytro Chyhrynskyi
LB	26	(Romania) Răzvan Raț
CM	19	(Ukraine) Oleksiy Gai		(substituted off) 80'
CM	3	(Czech Republic) Tomáš Hübschman
RW	11	(Brazil) Ilsinho	(yellow card) 55'
LW	22	(Brazil) Willian		(substituted off) 91'
AM	7	(Brazil) Fernandinho		(substituted off) 80'
CF	17	(Brazil) Luiz Adriano
Substitutes:
GK	12	(Ukraine) Rustam Khudzhamov
DF	36	(Ukraine) Oleksandr Chyzhov
MF	8	(Brazil) Jádson		(substituted on) 80'
MF	14	(Ukraine) Vasyl Kobin	(yellow card) 119'	(substituted on) 80'
MF	28	(Ukraine) Oleksiy Polyanskyi
FW	21	(Ukraine) Oleksandr Hladkyy
FW	77	(Nigeria) Julius Aghahowa		(substituted on) 91'
Manager:
(Romania) Mircea Lucescu

Assistant referees:
Peter Hermans (Belgium)
Walter Vromans (Belgium)
Fourth official:
Paul Allaerts (Belgium)

**Match rules**

- 90 minutes.
- 30 minutes of extra time if necessary.
- Penalty shoot-out if scores still level.
- Seven named substitutes.
- Maximum of three substitutions.

=== Statistics ===
First half
Statistic	Barcelona	Shakhtar Donetsk
Goals scored	0	0
Total shots	6	1
Shots on target	1	0
Saves	0	1
Ball possession	66%	34%
Corner kicks	6	0
Fouls committed	6	5
Offsides	0	3
Yellow cards	0	0
Red cards	0	0

Second half
Statistic	Barcelona	Shakhtar Donetsk
Goals scored	0	0
Total shots	11	3
Shots on target	6	1
Saves	1	6
Ball possession	63%	37%
Corner kicks	6	0
Fouls committed	5	7
Offsides	1	1
Yellow cards	1	3
Red cards	0	0

Extra time
Statistic	Barcelona	Shakhtar Donetsk
Goals scored	1	0
Total shots	6	3
Shots on target	3	2
Saves	2	2
Ball possession	55%	45%
Corner kicks	3	0
Fouls committed	4	6
Offsides	1	2
Yellow cards	1	1
Red cards	0	0

Overall
Statistic	Barcelona	Shakhtar Donetsk
Goals scored	1	0
Total shots	23	7
Shots on target	10	3
Saves	3	9
Ball possession	62%	38%
Corner kicks	15	0
Fouls committed	15	18
Offsides	2	6
Yellow cards	2	4
Red cards	0	0

== See also ==
- 2009–10 UEFA Champions League
- 2009–10 UEFA Europa League
- 2009–10 FC Barcelona season
- 2009–10 FC Shakhtar Donetsk season
- FC Barcelona in international football
- FC Shakhtar Donetsk in European football
