= 2009–10 FC Shakhtar Donetsk season =

Shakhtar Donetsk
2009–10 season
- Chairman: Rinat Akhmetov
- Manager: Mircea Lucescu
- Ground: Donbas Arena
- Premier League: 1st
- Ukrainian Cup: Semi-finals
- UEFA Europa League: Round of 32
- UEFA Champions League: Third qualifying round
- UEFA Super Cup: Runners-up
- Top goalscorer: League: Luiz Adriano (11); All: Luiz Adriano (17)
- Highest home attendance: 52,518 vs Dynamo Kyiv (5 May 2010)
- Lowest home attendance: 10,500 vs Kryvbas (18 July 2009)
- Average home league attendance: 30,753
Home colours	Away colours

The 2009–10 FC Shakhtar Donetsk season saw the club win their fifth Ukrainian Premier League. After winning the 2009 UEFA Cup, Shakhtar competed in the UEFA Super Cup for the first time, losing 1–0 to Barcelona after extra time. Shakhtar started the season in the UEFA Champions League as a result of winning the 2008–09 Premier League, but were knocked out at the third qualifying round by Poli Timișoara, resulting in them playing in the UEFA Europa League. Shakhtar managed to reach the round of 32 before falling to Fulham, while in the Ukrainian Cup they reached the semi-finals before falling to Metalurh Donetsk.

== Season events ==
On 4 July, Julius Aghahowa returned to Shakhtar on a free transfer from Kayserispor.

== Squad ==
As of match played 9 May 2010

Number	Name	Nationality	Position	Date of birth (age)	Signed from	Signed in	Contract ends	Apps.	Goals
Goalkeepers
12	Rustam Khudzhamov	(Ukraine)	GK	5 October 1982 (aged 27)	Kharkiv	2008		15	0
30	Andriy Pyatov	(Ukraine)	GK	28 June 1984 (aged 25)	Vorskla Poltava	2007		123	0
35	Yuriy Virt	(Ukraine)	GK	4 May 1974 (aged 36)	Metalurh Donetsk	2007			
40	Vyacheslav Bazylevych	(Ukraine)	GK	7 August 1990 (aged 19)	Academy	2007		0	0
60	Artem Tetenko	(Ukraine)	GK	12 February 1991 (aged 19)	Academy	2007		0	0
Defenders
3	Tomáš Hübschman	(Czech Republic)	DF	4 September 1981 (aged 28)	Sparta Prague	2004		191	8
5	Oleksandr Kucher	(Ukraine)	DF	22 October 1982 (aged 27)	Metalist Kharkiv	2006		111	3
13	Vyacheslav Shevchuk	(Ukraine)	DF	13 May 1979 (aged 30)	Dnipro Dnipropetrovsk	2005		114	0
14	Vasyl Kobin	(Ukraine)	DF	24 May 1985 (aged 24)	Karpaty Lviv	2009		33	3
18	Mariusz Lewandowski	(Poland)	DF	18 May 1979 (aged 30)	Dyskobolia Grodzisk	2001		275	30
26	Răzvan Raț	(Romania)	DF	26 May 1981 (aged 28)	Rapid București	2003		245	10
32	Mykola Ishchenko	(Ukraine)	DF	9 March 1983 (aged 27)	Karpaty Lviv	2008		45	0
33	Darijo Srna (Captain)	(Croatia)	DF	1 May 1982 (aged 28)	Hajduk Split	2003		264	20
36	Oleksandr Chyzhov	(Ukraine)	DF	10 August 1986 (aged 23)	Vorskla Poltava	2008		20	0
44	Yaroslav Rakitskyi	(Ukraine)	DF	3 August 1989 (aged 20)	Academy	2009		37	2
Midfielders
4	Igor Duljaj	(Serbia)	MF	29 October 1979 (aged 30)	Partizan	2004		195	6
7	Fernandinho	(Brazil)	MF	4 May 1985 (aged 25)	Paranaense	2005	2010	196	38
8	Jádson	(Brazil)	MF	5 October 1983 (aged 26)	Paranaense	2005	2009	219	52
11	Ilsinho	(Brazil)	MF	12 October 1985 (aged 24)	São Paulo	2007	2011	96	14
19	Oleksiy Hai	(Ukraine)	MF	6 November 1982 (aged 27)	Illichivets Mariupol	2000		173	19
20	Douglas Costa	(Brazil)	MF	14 September 1990 (aged 19)	Grêmio	2010	2015	15	5
22	Willian	(Brazil)	MF	9 August 1988 (aged 21)	Corinthians	2007	2012	119	16
23	Kostyantyn Kravchenko	(Ukraine)	MF	24 September 1986 (aged 23)	Dnipro Dnipropetrovsk	2008		23	9
29	Alex Teixeira	(Brazil)	MF	6 January 1990 (aged 20)	Vasco da Gama	2010	2015	3	0
	Roman Yemelyanov	(Russia)	MF	8 May 1992 (aged 18)	Tolyatti	2010	2013	0	0
Forwards
17	Luiz Adriano	(Brazil)	FW	12 April 1987 (aged 23)	Internacional	2007		90	31
21	Oleksandr Hladkyy	(Ukraine)	FW	24 August 1987 (aged 22)	Kharkiv	2007		118	36
24	Ruslan Fomin	(Ukraine)	FW	2 March 1986 (aged 24)	Arsenal Kharkiv	2005		30	5
77	Julius Aghahowa	(Nigeria)	FW	12 February 1982 (aged 28)	Kayserispor	2009		168	53
Away on loan
1	Bohdan Shust	(Ukraine)	GK	4 March 1986 (aged 24)	Karpaty Lviv	2005			
9	Nery Castillo	(Mexico)	FW	13 June 1984 (aged 25)	Olympiacos	2007	2012	18	2
28	Oleksiy Polyanskyi	(Ukraine)	DF	12 April 1986 (aged 24)	Metalurh Donetsk	2006			
44	Artem Fedetskyi	(Ukraine)	DF	26 April 1985 (aged 25)	Kharkiv	2008		9	1
55	Volodymyr Yezerskiy	(Ukraine)	DF	15 November 1976 (aged 33)	Dnipro Dnipropetrovsk	2007			
99	Leonardo	(Brazil)	DF	9 March 1986 (aged 24)	Santos	2005	2013		
	Marcelo Moreno	(Bolivia)	FW	18 June 1987 (aged 22)	Cruzeiro	2008		21	3
Players who left during the season
10	Yevhen Seleznyov	(Ukraine)	FW	20 July 1985 (aged 24)	Academy	2002		31	11
27	Dmytro Chyhrynskyi	(Ukraine)	DF	7 November 1986 (aged 23)	Academy	2002		137	10
90	Vitaliy Vitsenets	(Ukraine)	FW	3 August 1990 (aged 19)	Academy	2007		3	0
	Jan Laštůvka	(Czech Republic)	GK	7 July 1982 (aged 27)	Baník Ostrava	2004			

== Transfers ==
=== In ===
Date	Position	Nationality	Name	From	Fee	Ref.
1 July 2009	MF	(Ukraine)	Vasyl Kobin	Karpaty Lviv	Undisclosed	
4 July 2009	FW	(Nigeria)	Julius Aghahowa	Kayserispor	Free	
22 December 2009	MF	(Brazil)	Alex Teixeira	Vasco da Gama	Undisclosed	
10 January 2010	MF	(Brazil)	Douglas Costa	Grêmio	Undisclosed	
24 January 2010	MF	(Russia)	Roman Yemelyanov	Togliatti	Undisclosed	

=== Out ===
Date	Position	Nationality	Name	To	Fee	Ref.
24 July 2009	FW	(Ukraine)	Yevhen Seleznyov	Dnipro Dnipropetrovsk	End of season	
4 August 2009	GK	(Czech Republic)	Jan Laštůvka	Dnipro Dnipropetrovsk	€3,000,000	
31 August 2009	DF	(Ukraine)	Dmytro Chyhrynskyi	Barcelona	Undisclosed	
10 March 2010	FW	(Ukraine)	Vitaliy Vitsenets	Zorya Luhansk	Undisclosed	

=== Loans out ===
Date From	Position	Nationality	Name	To	Date To	Ref.
29 May 2009	FW	(Bolivia)	Marcelo Moreno	Werder Bremen	31 December 2009	
1 July 2009	GK	(Ukraine)	Bohdan Shust	Metalurh Donetsk	End of season	
1 July 2009	DF	(Ukraine)	Artem Fedetskyi	Karpaty Lviv	End of season	
30 July 2009	FW	(Mexico)	Nery Castillo	Dnipro Dnipropetrovsk	End of season	
3 September 2009	DF	(Brazil)	Leonardo	Grêmio Barueri	End of season	
1 January 2010	DF	(Ukraine)	Oleksiy Polyanskyi	Zorya Luhansk	End of season	
1 January 2010	DF	(Ukraine)	Volodymyr Yezerskiy	Zorya Luhansk	End of season	
1 February 2010	FW	(Bolivia)	Marcelo Moreno	Wigan Athletic	End of season	

== Competitions ==
=== Overall ===
Competition	First match	Last match	Starting round	Final position	Record							
Competition	First match	Last match	Starting round	Final position	Pld	W	D	L	GF	GA	GD	Win %
Premier League	18 July 2009	9 May 2010	Matchday 1	Champions	30	24	5	1	62	18	+44	80.00
Ukrainian Cup	15 August 2009	24 March 2010	Round of 32	Semifinal	5	4	0	1	10	3	+7	80.00
UEFA Super Cup	28 August 2009		Final	Runners Up	1	0	0	1	0	1	−1	0.00
UEFA Champions League	29 July 2009	5 August 2009	Third qualifying round	Third qualifying round	2	0	2	0	2	2	+0	0.00
Europa League	20 August 2009	25 February 2010	Play-off round	Round of 32	9	6	2	1	14	6	+8	66.67
Total					47	34	9	4	88	30	+58	72.34

Last updated: 9 May 2010
Source: Results

=== UEFA Super Cup ===
28 August 2009	Barcelona (Spain)	1–0 (a.e.t.)	(Ukraine) Shakhtar Donetsk	Monaco
21:45 EEST (UTC+3)	Messi (yellow card) 90+3'; Pedro (yellow card) 107', (goal) 115'	Report	Ilsinho (yellow card) 55'; Srna (yellow card) 65'; Kucher (yellow card) 90+3'; Kobin (yellow card) 119'	Stadium: Stade Louis II; Attendance: 17,738; Referee: Frank De Bleeckere (Belgium)

=== Premier League ===
==== League table ====
Pos	Team	Pld	W	D	L	GF	GA	GD	Pts	Qualification or relegation
1	Shakhtar Donetsk (C)	30	24	5	1	62	18	+44	77	Qualification to Champions League group stage
2	Dynamo Kyiv	30	22	5	3	61	16	+45	71	Qualification to Champions League third qualifying round
3	Metalist Kharkiv	30	19	5	6	49	23	+26	62	Qualification to Europa League play-off round
4	Dnipro Dnipropetrovsk	30	15	9	6	48	25	+23	54	Qualification to Europa League third qualifying round
5	Karpaty Lviv	30	13	11	6	44	35	+9	50	Qualification to Europa League second qualifying round

Source: uafootball.net.ua
Rules for classification: 1st points; 2nd goal difference; 3rd goals scored; 4th fair play
(C) Champions

==== Results summary ====
Overall								Home						Away					
Pld	W	D	L	GF	GA	GD	Pts	W	D	L	GF	GA	GD	W	D	L	GF	GA	GD
30	24	5	1	62	18	+44	77	14	1	0	37	6	+31	10	4	1	25	12	+13

Last updated: 9 May 2010.
Source: Results

==== Results by round ====
Round	1	2	3	4	5	6	7	8	9	10	11	12	13	14	15	16	17	18	19	20	21	22	23	24	25	26	27	28	29	30
Ground	H	A	A	H	H	A	A	H	A	H	A	A	A	H	A	H	H	H	A	H	A	H	A	H	A	H	H	A	H	A
Result	W	W	D	W	W	W	D	W	D	W	D	W	L	W	W	W	W	W	W	W	W	W	W	D	W	W	W	W	W	W
Position	2	2	3	2	2	2	2	2	2	2	2	2	3	3	2	2	2	2	2	2	1	1	1	2	2	2	1	1	1	1

Updated to match(es) played on 9 May 2010. Source: Results
A = Away; H = Home; W = Win; D = Draw; L = Loss

==== Results ====
18 July 2009 1	Shakhtar Donetsk	3–0	Kryvbas	Donetsk
20:00 EEST (UTC+3)	Jádson 19', 47'; Aghahowa 34'; Hübschman (yellow card) 40'	Report	Svyrydov (yellow card) 18'; Bulku (yellow card) 42'	Stadium: RSC Olimpiyskiy; Attendance: 10,500; Referee: Olexander Derdo

25 July 2009 2	Illichivets Mariupol	0–2	Shakhtar Donetsk	Mariupol
20:00 EEST (UTC+3)	Yaroshenko (yellow card) 10'; Savin (yellow card) 56'	Report	Luiz Adriano 7', 30', (yellow card) 14'; Srna (yellow card) 56'	Stadium: Illichivets Stadium; Attendance: 8,500; Referee: Sergiy Dankovskyi

1 August 2009 3	Vorskla Poltava	1–1	Shakhtar Donetsk	Poltava
20:00 EEST (UTC+3)	Curri (yellow card) 34'; Yesin (yellow card) 55', (goal) 75'; Krasnopyorov (yellow card) 87'; Januzi (yellow card) 88'	Report	Chyzhov (yellow card) 20'; Raț 45'; Hladkyi (yellow card) 69'	Stadium: Oleksiy Butovskyi Vorskla Stadium; Attendance: 16,000; Referee: Victor Shvetsov

9 August 2009 4	Shakhtar Donetsk	4–1	Metalurh Donetsk	Donetsk
20:00 EEST (UTC+3)	Polyanskyi 11'; Hladkyi 47', 60'; Kucher 90+2'	Report	Kingsley 72'; Makrides (yellow card) 76'; Bilozir (yellow card) 90'	Stadium: RSC Olimpiyskiy; Attendance: 13,500; Referee: Yevgen Venger

31 August 2009 6	Shakhtar Donetsk	3–1	Zorya Luhansk	Luhansk
17:00 EEST (UTC+3)	Lewandowski 28'; Jádson 39'; Kravchenko 90+1'	Report	Lazarovych 9'	Stadium: Avanhard Stadium; Attendance: 12,300; Referee: Yury Grisjo

20 September 2009 7	Arsenal Kyiv	2–4	Shakhtar Donetsk	Boryspil
16:00 EEST (UTC+3)	Vorobey 9'; Yevseyev 65'	Report	Fernandinho 38' (pen.); Hladkyi 40'; Kravchenko 72', 86'	Stadium: Kolos Stadium; Attendance: 5,600; Referee: Yuri Mozharovskiy

23 September 2009 5	Metalist Kharkiv	1–1	Shakhtar Donetsk	Kharkiv
19:00 EEST (UTC+3)	Oliynyk 17'; Shelayev (yellow card) 32'; Obradović (yellow card) 43'	Report	Kravchenko 9'; Raț (yellow card) 26'; Srna (yellow card) 32'; Jádson (yellow card) 90'	Stadium: Metalist Oblast Sports Complex; Attendance: 37,000; Referee: Oleg Derevinskyi

27 September 2009 8	Shakhtar Donetsk	4–0	Obolon Kyiv	Donetsk
17:00 EEST (UTC+3)	Jádson 18' (pen.); Ilsinho 35'; Kobin 84'; Willian 88'	Report	Sibiryakov (yellow card) 58'	Stadium: Donbas Arena; Attendance: 42,800; Referee: Vitaliy Godulyan

4 October 2009 9	Dnipro Dnipropetrovsk	2–2	Shakhtar Donetsk	Dnipropetrovsk
17:00 EEST (UTC+3)	Kalynychenko 45+2'; Seleznyov 56'; Rotan (yellow card) 62'; Borovyk (yellow card) 90'	Report	Luiz Adriano 25', 74'; Willian (yellow card) 47'; Srna (yellow card) 52'	Stadium: Dnipro-Arena; Attendance: 29,511; Referee: Yevhen Herenda

18 October 2009 10	Shakhtar Donetsk	5–1	Karpaty Lviv	Donetsk
16:00 EEST (UTC+3)	Fernandinho 6' (pen.), 58'; Jádson 14' (pen.); Ishchenko (yellow card) 54'; Luiz Adriano 76' (pen.), 87'	Report	Tlumak (yellow card) 4'; Tubić (yellow card) 13'; Oshchypko (yellow card) 64'; Holodyuk 68'	Stadium: Donbas Arena; Attendance: 40,371; Referee: Igor Ishchenko

25 October 2009 11	Zakarpattia Uzhhorod	1–1	Shakhtar Donetsk	Uzhhorod
14:00 EET (UTC+2)	Trišović 50'	Report	Ishchenko (yellow card) 34'; Gai 37'; Kobin (yellow card) 44'; Chyzhov (red card) 78'; Jádson (yellow card) 90+2'	Stadium: Avanhard Stadium; Attendance: 5,500; Referee: Yury Grisjo

1 November 2009 12	Chornomorets Odesa	0–1	Shakhtar Donetsk	Odesa
14:00 EET (UTC+2)	Vázquez (yellow card) 18'; Melnyk (yellow card) 30'	Report	Jádson 2', (yellow card) 32'; Raț (yellow card) 18'; Gai (yellow card) 31'; Hübschman (yellow card) 90+1'	Stadium: Chornomorets Stadium; Attendance: 4,800; Referee: Evgen Aranovskiy

21 November 2009 14	Dynamo Kyiv	3–0	Shakhtar Donetsk	Kyiv
15:00 EET (UTC+2)	Milevskyi 45', 54'; Yarmolenko (yellow card) 49', (goal) 61'; Gérson Magrão (yellow card) 63'; Yussuf (yellow card) 84'	Report	Fernandinho (yellow card) 40'; Srna (yellow card) 50'; Rakitskyi (yellow card) 73'; Willian (yellow card) 84'	Stadium: Olimpiyskiy National Sports Complex; Attendance: 14,500; Referee: Victor Shvetsov

28 November 2009 15	Shakhtar Donetsk	3–0	Tavriya Simferopol	Donetsk
15:00 EET (UTC+2)	Luiz Adriano 10', 85'; Jádson (yellow card) 63'; Ilsinho 67'	Report	Monakhov (yellow card) 25'	Stadium: Donbas Arena; Attendance: 30,078; Referee: Igor Pokidko

6 December 2009 16	Kryvbas	0–2	Shakhtar Donetsk	Kryvyi Rih
14:00 EET (UTC+2)		Report	Fernandinho 31' (pen.); Hladkyi 90+2'	Stadium: Metalurh Stadium; Attendance: 2,500; Referee: Sergiy Boyko

9 December 2009 13	Shakhtar Donetsk	2–0	Metalurh Zaporizhya	Donetsk
19:00 EET (UTC+2)	Willian 64'; Luiz Adriano 84' (pen.)	Report	Koval (yellow card) 83'	Stadium: Donbas Arena; Attendance: 17,527; Referee: Sergiy Lysenchuk

12 December 2009 17	Shakhtar Donetsk	2–1	Illichivets Mariupol	Donetsk
14:00 EET (UTC+2)	Chyzhov (yellow card) 39'; Fomin 51'; Kravchenko 56'; Fernandinho (yellow card) 60'; Hübschman (yellow card) 69'	Report	Kasyan (yellow card) 29' (yellow-red card) 43'; Kirylchyk 35'; Romanenko (yellow card) 39'	Stadium: Donbas Arena; Attendance: 15,147; Referee: SErgiy Dankovskyi

28 February 2010 18	Shakhtar Donetsk	1–0	Vorskla Poltava	Donetsk
15:00 EET (UTC+2)	Jádson 45'; Luiz Adriano (yellow card) 67'; Kobin (yellow card) 90+2'	Report	Matveev (yellow card) 67' (yellow-red card) 88'	Stadium: Donbas Arena; Attendance: 20,000; Referee: Orest Shmygelskyi

7 March 2010 19	Metalurh Donetsk	0–1	Shakhtar Donetsk	Donetsk
14:30 EET (UTC+2)		Report	Kobin (yellow card) 41'; Hladkyi 45', (yellow card) 65'; Luiz Adriano (red card) 84'; Pyatov (yellow card) 90+2'	Stadium: Metalurh Stadium; Attendance: 4,000; Referee: Yevhen Herenda

14 March 2010 20	Shakhtar Donetsk	2–1	Metalist Kharkiv	Donetsk
16:00 EET (UTC+2)	Ishchenko (yellow card) 20'; Lewandowski 31'; Rakitskyi (yellow card) 43'; Hladkyi (yellow card) 49'; Douglas Costa 79'; Fernandinho (yellow card) 85'	Report	Antonov 14'; Valyaev (yellow card) 43'; Putivtsev (yellow card) 49'; Gueye (yellow card) 50'; Shelayev (yellow card) 69'; Fininho (yellow card) 83'	Stadium: Donbas Arena; Attendance: 31,254; Referee: Igor Ishchenko

20 March 2010 21	Zorya Luhansk	0–2	Shakhtar Donetsk	Donetsk
16:00 EET (UTC+2)	Kartushov (yellow card) 82'; Kovalyov (yellow card) 87'	Report	Willian 25'; Srna 57'; Ilsinho (yellow card) 84'	Stadium: Donbas Arena; Attendance: 22,189; Referee: Yury Vaks

28 March 2010 22	Shakhtar Donetsk	3–1	Arsenal Kyiv	Donetsk
16:00 EEST (UTC+3)	Jádson 14'; Luiz Adriano (yellow card) 14'; Willian 27'; Douglas Costa 90+2'	Report	Mikoliūnas (yellow card) 28'; Shatskikh 78'	Stadium: Donbas Arena; Attendance: 23,127; Referee: Andriy Shandor

3 April 2010 23	Obolon Kyiv	0–1	Shakhtar Donetsk	Kyiv
19:00 EEST (UTC+3)	Rozhok (yellow card) 8'; Karamushka (yellow card) 30'; Onysko (yellow card) 45'; Yavorskiy (yellow card) 61'; Comleonoc (yellow card) 89'	Report	Fomin (yellow card) 37'; Srna 51'; Douglas Costa (yellow card) 88'	Stadium: Obolon Arena; Attendance: 5,100; Referee: Victor Shvetsov

10 April 2010 24	Shakhtar Donetsk	0–0	Dnipro Dnipropetrovsk	Donetsk
16:00 EEST (UTC+3)	Fernandinho (yellow card) 45+2'	Report	Seleznyov (yellow card) 8'; Lobjanidze (yellow card) 16'; Denisov (yellow card) 56'	Stadium: Donbas Arena; Attendance: 38,195; Referee: Oleg Derevinskyi

15 April 2010 25	Karpaty Lviv	0–2	Shakhtar Donetsk	Lviv
19:00 EEST (UTC+3)	Kopolovets (yellow card) 11'; Godwin (yellow card) 22'; Petrivskyi (yellow card) 68'; Batista (red card) 74'	Report	Hübschman (yellow card) 22'; Raț (red card) 74'; Luiz Adriano 79', (yellow card) 83'; Fernandinho (yellow card) 86'; Willian 90+1'	Stadium: Ukraina Stadium; Attendance: 27,047; Referee: Igor Pokidko

18 April 2010 26	Shakhtar Donetsk	1–0	Zakarpattia Uzhhorod	Donetsk
16:00 EEST (UTC+3)	Hladkyi 42', (yellow card) 43'; Willian (yellow card) 82'	Report	Malysh (yellow card) 11'; Boyko (yellow card) 85'	Stadium: Donbas Arena; Attendance: 23,378; Referee: Vitaliy Godulyan

25 April 2010 27	Shakhtar Donetsk	3–0	Chornomorets Odesa	Donetsk
17:00 EEST (UTC+3)	Jádson 6' (pen.); Douglas Costa 50'; Luiz Adriano 66'	Report	Saucedo (yellow card) 60'	Stadium: Donbas Arena; Attendance: 29,228; Referee: Sergiy Lysenchuk

1 May 2010 28	Metalurh Zaporizhya	0–2	Shakhtar Donetsk	Zaporizhia
17:00 EEST (UTC+3)	Stepanenko (yellow card) 40'; Nesterov (yellow card) 83'; Tsiharaw (yellow card) 90+2'	Report	Ilsinho 22'; Douglas Costa 90+3'	Stadium: Slavutych-Arena; Attendance: 12,000; Referee: Yuri Mozharovskiy

5 May 2010 29	Shakhtar Donetsk	1–0	Dynamo Kyiv	Donetsk
19:00 EEST (UTC+3)	Ilsinho 15'; Kucher (yellow card) 21'; Jádson (yellow card) 32'; Pyatov (yellow card) 72'; Douglas Costa (yellow card) 90'	Report	Vukojević (yellow card) 18'; Yussuf (yellow card) 55'; Shevchenko (yellow card) 82'; Ghioane (yellow card) 87'	Stadium: Donbas Arena; Attendance: 52,518; Referee: Paolo Tagliavento

9 May 2010 30	Tavriya Simferopol	2–3	Shakhtar Donetsk	Simferopol
16:00 EEST (UTC+3)	Ljubenović 10'; Kovpak 25'	Report	Kobin (yellow card) 41'; Rakitskyi (yellow card) 58'; Lewandowski (yellow card) 71'; Kravchenko 59', 68', (yellow card) 90'; Douglas Costa 80'	Stadium: Lokomotiv Republican Sports Complex; Attendance: 13,250; Referee: Yevhen Herenda

=== Ukrainian Cup ===
15 August 2009 Round of 32	Dnister Ovidiopol	1–6	Shakhtar Donetsk	Odesa
17:00 EET (UTC+2)	Poltavets 76' (pen.); V. Leshchuk (yellow card) 89'	Report	Kobin 13'; Willian 37'; Fomin 38'; Jádson 52'; Polyanskiy 74'; Aghahowa 81'	Stadium: Spartak Stadium; Attendance: 4,000; Referee: Volodymyr Sirenko
Note: Match played at Spartak Stadium, Odesa to accommodate a larger crowd.

12 September 2009 Round of 16	Yednist' Plysky	1–3	Shakhtar Donetsk	Plysky
15:00 EET (UTC+2)	V. Zavarin (yellow card) 20'; Nakonechny 55'	Report	Rakytskiy 44'; Kravchenko 50'; Hladkyy 84'	Stadium: Yednist Stadium; Attendance: 1,500; Referee: Yevhen Abrosymov

28 October 2009 Quarterfinals	Shakhtar Donetsk	2–0	Dynamo Kyiv	Donetsk
19:30 EET (UTC+2)	Hübschman (yellow card) 16'; Srna 23', (yellow card) 45'; Fernandinho (yellow card) 38', (goal) 90+3'; Willian (yellow card) 90+4'	Report	Khacheridi (yellow card) 27'; Milevskyi (yellow card) 45'; Betão (yellow card) 54'; Yarmolenko (yellow card) 70'; Vukojević (red card) 85'	Stadium: Donbas Arena; Attendance: 47,452; Referee: Volodymyr Sirenko

24 March 2010 Semifinals	Metalurh Donetsk	2–1	Shakhtar Donetsk	Donetsk
18:00 EET (UTC+2)	Mguni 6'; Dimitrov 9'; Yankov (yellow card) 31' (yellow-red card) 75'; Dimitrov (yellow card) 49'; Dišljenković (yellow card) 69'	Report	Srna (yellow card) 42'; Hladkyy (yellow card) 42'; Ischenko (yellow card) 61'; Fernandihno 90+2'	Stadium: Metalurh Stadium; Attendance: 5,100; Referee: Oleh Zubariev

=== UEFA Champions League ===
==== Qualifying phase ====
29 July 2009 Third qualifying round 1st leg	Shakhtar Donetsk (Ukraine)	2–2	(Romania) Poli Timișoara	Donetsk, Ukraine
20:00 EEST (UTC+3)	Hladkyi 61'; Srna (yellow card) 75'; Fernandinho 86'	Report	Bucur 20', 80'; Bourceanu (yellow card) 37'; Karamyan (yellow card) 39'; Stancu (yellow card) 74'; Magera (yellow card) 74'	Stadium: RSC Olimpiyskiy; Attendance: 18,000; Referee: Eduardo Iturralde González (Spain)

5 August 2009 Third qualifying round 2nd leg	Poli Timișoara (Romania)	0–0 ((a)2 – 2 agg.)	(Ukraine) Shakhtar Donetsk	Timișoara, Romania
20:30 EEST (UTC+3)	Alexa (yellow card) 24'; Karamyan (yellow card) 45+1'; Bourceanu (yellow card) 87'	Report	Hübschman (yellow card) 86'; Kucher (yellow card) 82'; Srna (yellow card) 86'	Stadium: Stadionul Dan Păltinişanu; Attendance: 25,000; Referee: Terje Hauge (Norway)

=== UEFA Europa League ===
==== Play-off round ====
20 August 2009 Play-off round 1st leg	Sivasspor (Turkey)	0–3	(Ukraine) Shakhtar Donetsk	Sivas, Turkey
21:00 EEST (UTC+3)	Çakmak (yellow card) 14'; Dağaşan (yellow card) 75'; Bayrak (yellow card) 86'; Petkovic (red card) 90+1'	Report	Gai 6'; Jádson (yellow card) 16'; Gai (yellow card) 75'; Ilsinho 76'; Kobin 87'	Stadium: 4 Eylül; Attendance: 8,500; Referee: Mike Dean (England)

25 August 2009 Play-off round 2nd leg	Shakhtar Donetsk (Ukraine)	2–0 (5–0 agg.)	(Turkey) Sivasspor	Donetsk, Ukraine
19:00 EEST (UTC+3)	Jádson 21' (pen.); Polyanskiy (yellow card) 51'; Luiz Adriano 59' (pen.)	Report	Sözgelmez (yellow card) 34'; Çakmak (yellow card) 14'; Kavuk (yellow card) 89'	Stadium: RSC Olimpiyskiy; Attendance: 18,000; Referee: Matteo Trefoloni (Italy)
Note: Played on 25 August due to Shakhtar Donetsk's participation in the 2009 UEFA Super Cup.

==== Group stage ====
Pos	Team	Pld	W	D	L	GF	GA	GD	Pts	Qualification
1	(Ukraine) Shakhtar Donetsk	6	4	1	1	14	3	+11	13	Advance to knockout phase
2	(Belgium) Club Brugge	6	3	2	1	10	8	+2	11	Advance to knockout phase
3	(France) Toulouse	6	2	1	3	6	11	−5	7	
4	(Serbia) Partizan	6	1	0	5	6	14	−8	3	

Source: Soccerway

17 September 2009 1	Club Brugge (Belgium)	1–4	(Ukraine) Shakhtar Donetsk	Bruges, Belgium
22:05 EEST (UTC+3)	Alcaraz (yellow card) 38'; Dirar (yellow card) 47'; Akpala (yellow card) 61'; Geraerts 62'	Report	Gai 11'; Willian 19'; Srna 35'; Luiz Adriano (yellow card) 67'; Kravchenko 75'	Stadium: Jan Breydel Stadium; Attendance: 17,770; Referee: Martin Ingvarsson (Sweden)

1 October 2009 2	Shakhtar Donetsk (Ukraine)	4–1	(Serbia) Partizan	Donetsk, Ukraine
20:00 EEST (UTC+3)	Lomić 24' (o.g.); Luiz Adriano 39'; Jádson 54'; Rakytskiy 67'	Report	Ljajić 86'	Stadium: Donbas Arena; Attendance: 49,480; Referee: William Collum (Scotland)

22 October 2009 3	Shakhtar Donetsk (Ukraine)	4–0	(France) Toulouse	Donetsk, Ukraine
20:00 EEST (UTC+3)	Fernandinho 7' (pen.); Luiz Adriano 24', 56'; Hübschman 38'	Report	M'Bengue (yellow card) 57'	Stadium: Donbas Arena; Attendance: 50,217; Referee: Bruno Paixão (Portugal)

5 November 2009 4	Toulouse (France)	0–2	(Ukraine) Shakhtar Donetsk	Toulouse, France
22:05 EET (UTC+2)	Sirieix (yellow card) 45+3'; M'Bengue (yellow card) 49'; Berson (yellow card) 72'	Report	Raț (yellow card) 34'; Luiz Adriano 50'; Gai 63'	Stadium: Stadium Municipal; Attendance: 12,046; Referee: César Muñiz Fernández (Spain)

3 December 2009 5	Shakhtar Donetsk (Ukraine)	0–0	(Belgium) Club Brugge	Donetsk, Ukraine
20:00 EET (UTC+2)	Srna (yellow card) 67'	Report	Simaeys (yellow card) 37'; Sonck (yellow card) 69'; Klukowski (yellow card) 75'; Stijnen (yellow card) 85'	Stadium: Donbas Arena; Attendance: 46,000; Referee: Zsolt Szabó (Hungary)

16 December 2009 6	Partizan (Serbia)	1–0	(Ukraine) Shakhtar Donetsk	Belgrade, Serbia
22:05 EET (UTC+2)	Diarra 6'; Petrović (yellow card) 16'; Ljajić (yellow card) 29'; Fejsa (yellow card) 70'; Tomić (yellow card) 82'	Report	Raț (yellow card) 74'	Stadium: Partizan Stadium; Attendance: 6,000; Referee: Michael Weiner (Germany)

==== Knockout phase ====
18 February 2010 Round of 32 1st leg	Fulham (England)	2–1	(Ukraine) Shakhtar Donetsk	London, England
22:05 EET (UTC+2)	Gera 3'; Murphy (yellow card) 53'; Zamora 63'	Report	Luiz Adriano (yellow card) 21', (goal) 32'; Srna (yellow card) 45'	Stadium: Craven Cottage; Attendance: 21,832; Referee: Serge Gumienny (Belgium)

25 February 2010 Round of 32 2nd leg	Shakhtar Donetsk (Ukraine)	1–1 (2–3 agg.)	(England) Fulham	Donetsk, Ukraine
20:00 EET (UTC+2)	Jádson 69'; Ilsinho (yellow card) 90+3'	Report	Hangeland 33'; Gera (yellow card) 77'; Murphy (red card) 90+4'	Stadium: Donbas Arena; Attendance: 47,509; Referee: Svein Oddvar Moen (Norway)

== Squad statistics ==
As of match played 9 May 2010

=== Appearances and goals ===
No.	Pos	Nat	Player	Total		Premier League		Ukrainian Cup		UEFA Champions League		UEFA Europa League		UEFA Super Cup	
No.	Pos	Nat	Player	Apps	Goals	Apps	Goals	Apps	Goals	Apps	Goals	Apps	Goals	Apps	Goals
3	DF	(Czech Republic) CZE	Tomáš Hübschman	30	1	15+3	0	1	0	2	0	8	1	1	0
4	MF	(Serbia) SRB	Igor Duljaj	18	0	11+3	0	2	0	0	0	1+1	0	0	0
5	DF	(Ukraine) UKR	Oleksandr Kucher	26	1	14	1	1	0	2	0	8	0	1	0
7	MF	(Brazil) BRA	Fernandinho	39	8	24	4	2	2	2	1	9+1	1	1	0
8	MF	(Brazil) BRA	Jádson	43	13	22+4	9	2+2	1	2	0	10	3	0+1	0
11	MF	(Brazil) BRA	Ilsinho	36	5	16+7	4	3	0	2	0	7	1	1	0
12	GK	(Ukraine) UKR	Rustam Khudzhamov	6	0	3	0	2	0	0	0	1	0	0	0
13	DF	(Ukraine) UKR	Vyacheslav Shevchuk	8	0	6	0	1	0	0	0	1	0	0	0
14	DF	(Ukraine) UKR	Vasyl Kobin	33	3	17+7	1	2	1	0	0	3+3	1	0+1	0
17	FW	(Brazil) BRA	Luiz Adriano	36	17	21+2	11	1	0	2	0	8+1	6	1	0
18	MF	(Poland) POL	Mariusz Lewandowski	19	2	9+5	2	1	0	0	0	1+3	0	0	0
19	MF	(Ukraine) UKR	Oleksiy Gai	23	4	5+8	1	0+2	0	1	0	4+2	3	1	0
20	MF	(Brazil) BRA	Douglas Costa	15	5	4+9	5	0	0	0	0	0+2	0	0	0
21	FW	(Ukraine) UKR	Oleksandr Hladkyi	30	9	15+7	6	1+1	1	0+2	1	1+3	1	0	0
22	MF	(Brazil) BRA	Willian	39	7	20+2	5	4	1	1+1	0	9+1	1	1	0
23	MF	(Ukraine) UKR	Kostyantyn Kravchenko	17	9	5+6	7	2	1	0	0	0+4	1	0	0
24	FW	(Ukraine) UKR	Ruslan Fomin	15	2	4+8	1	2+1	1	0	0	0	0	0	0
26	DF	(Romania) ROU	Răzvan Raț	31	1	13+5	1	1+1	0	1	0	9	0	1	0
29	MF	(Brazil) BRA	Alex Teixeira	3	0	2+1	0	0	0	0	0	0	0	0	0
30	GK	(Ukraine) UKR	Andriy Pyatov	41	0	27	0	2	0	2	0	9	0	1	0
32	DF	(Ukraine) UKR	Mykola Ishchenko	18	0	12	0	2	0	1	0	2+1	0	0	0
33	DF	(Croatia) CRO	Darijo Srna	39	4	24+2	2	2	1	2	0	8	1	1	0
36	DF	(Ukraine) UKR	Oleksandr Chyzhov	11	0	8+1	0	1	0	0	0	1	0	0	0
44	DF	(Ukraine) UKR	Yaroslav Rakitskyi	37	2	22+2	0	4	1	0	0	8+1	1	0	0
77	FW	(Nigeria) NGR	Julius Aghahowa	18	2	4+5	1	2+1	1	0+2	0	1+2	0	0+1	0
Players away from Shakhtar Donetsk on loan:
28	MF	(Ukraine) UKR	Oleksiy Polyanskyi	9	2	3+1	1	2	1	0	0	1+2	0	0	0
55	MF	(Ukraine) UKR	Volodymyr Yezerskiy	2	0	0	0	1+1	0	0	0	0	0	0	0
99	DF	(Brazil) BRA	Leonardo	1	0	0	0	0+1	0	0	0	0	0	0	0
Players that left Shakhtar Donetsk during the season:
27	DF	(Ukraine) UKR	Dmytro Chyhrynskyi	8	0	4	0	0	0	1+1	0	1	0	1	0
90	MF	(Ukraine) UKR	Vitaliy Vitsenets	3	0	0+2	0	0	0	0	0	0+1	0	0	0

=== Goal scorers ===
Place	Position	Nation	Number	Name	Premier League	Ukrainian Cup	UEFA Champions League	UEFA Europa League	UEFA Super Cup	Total
1	FW	(Brazil)	17	Luiz Adriano	11	0	0	6	0	17
2	MF	(Brazil)	8	Jádson	9	1	0	3	0	13
3	MF	(Ukraine)	23	Kostyantyn Kravchenko	7	1	0	1	0	9
4	FW	(Ukraine)	21	Oleksandr Hladkyi	6	1	1	0	0	8
4	MF	(Brazil)	7	Fernandinho	4	2	1	1	0	8
6	MF	(Brazil)	22	Willian	5	1	0	1	0	7
7	MF	(Brazil)	20	Douglas Costa	5	0	0	0	0	5
7	MF	(Brazil)	11	Ilsinho	4	0	0	1	0	5
9	MF	(Ukraine)	19	Oleksiy Gai	1	0	0	3	0	4
9	DF	(Croatia)	33	Darijo Srna	2	1	0	1	0	4
11	DF	(Ukraine)	14	Vasyl Kobin	1	1	0	1	0	3
12	DF	(Poland)	18	Mariusz Lewandowski	2	0	0	0	0	2
12	FW	(Ukraine)	24	Ruslan Fomin	1	1	0	0	0	2
12	MF	(Ukraine)	28	Oleksiy Polyanskyi	1	1	0	0	0	2
12	FW	(Nigeria)	77	Julius Aghahowa	1	1	0	0	0	2
12	DF	(Ukraine)	44	Yaroslav Rakitskyi	0	1	0	1	0	2
17	DF	(Romania)	26	Răzvan Raț	1	0	0	0	0	1
17	DF	(Ukraine)	5	Oleksandr Kucher	1	0	0	0	0	1
17	MF	(Czech Republic)	3	Tomáš Hübschman	0	0	0	1	0	1
17				Own goal	0	0	0	1	0	1
				TOTALS	62	12	2	21	0	97

=== Clean sheets ===
Place	Position	Nation	Number	Name	Premier League	Ukrainian Cup	UEFA Champions League	UEFA Europa League	UEFA Super Cup	Total
1	GK	(Ukraine)	30	Andriy Pyatov	17	1	1	4	0	23
2	GK	(Ukraine)	12	Rustam Khudzhamov	0	0	0	1	0	1
				TOTALS	17	1	1	5	0	24

=== Disciplinary record ===
Number	Nation	Position	Name	Premier League		Ukrainian Cup		UEFA Champions League		UEFA Europa League		UEFA Super Cup		Total	
Number	Nation	Position	Name	Booked	Sent off (straight red)	Booked	Sent off (straight red)	Booked	Sent off (straight red)	Booked	Sent off (straight red)	Booked	Sent off (straight red)	Booked	Sent off (straight red)
3	(Czech Republic)	DF	Tomáš Hübschman	4	0	1	0	1	0	0	0	0	0	2	0
5	(Ukraine)	DF	Oleksandr Kucher	1	0	0	0	1	0	0	0	1	0	2	0
7	(Brazil)	MF	Fernandinho	5	0	1	0	0	0	0	0	0	0	1	0
8	(Brazil)	MF	Jádson	5	0	0	0	0	0	1	0	0	0	1	0
11	(Brazil)	MF	Ilsinho	1	0	0	0	0	0	1	0	1	0	2	0
14	(Ukraine)	MF	Vasyl Kobin	4	0	0	0	0	0	0	0	1	0	1	0
17	(Brazil)	FW	Luiz Adriano	4	1	0	0	0	0	2	0	0	0	2	0
18	(Poland)	DF	Mariusz Lewandowski	1	0	0	0	0	0	0	0	0	0	1	0
19	(Ukraine)	MF	Oleksiy Gai	1	0	0	0	0	0	1	0	0	0	1	0
20	(Brazil)	MF	Douglas Costa	2	0	0	0	0	0	0	0	0	0	1	0
21	(Ukraine)	FW	Oleksandr Hladkyi	4	0	1	0	0	0	0	0	0	0	1	0
22	(Brazil)	MF	Willian	3	0	1	0	0	0	0	0	0	0	1	0
23	(Ukraine)	MF	Kostyantyn Kravchenko	1	0	0	0	0	0	0	0	0	0	1	0
24	(Ukraine)	FW	Ruslan Fomin	1	0	0	0	0	0	0	0	0	0	1	0
26	(Romania)	DF	Răzvan Raț	2	1	0	0	0	0	2	0	0	0	2	1
30	(Ukraine)	GK	Andriy Pyatov	2	0	0	0	0	0	0	0	0	0	1	0
32	(Ukraine)	DF	Mykola Ishchenko	3	0	1	0	0	0	0	0	0	0	1	0
33	(Croatia)	DF	Darijo Srna	4	0	2	0	2	0	2	0	1	0	7	0
36	(Ukraine)	DF	Oleksandr Chyzhov	2	1	0	0	0	0	0	0	0	0	1	0
44	(Ukraine)	DF	Yaroslav Rakitskyi	3	0	0	0	0	0	0	0	0	0	1	0
Players away on loan:
28	(Ukraine)	MF	Oleksiy Polyanskyi	0	0	0	0	0	0	1	0	0	0	1	0
Players who left Shakhtar Donetsk during the season:
			TOTALS	53	3	7	0	4	0	10	0	4	0	78	3
