= 2010 Ukrainian Super Cup =

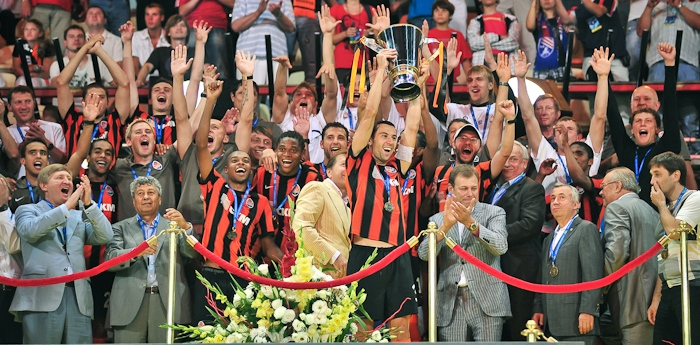
- Srna holding the trophy
Shakhtar Donetsk	Tavriya Simferopol
7	1
- Date: 4 July 2010
- Venue: Slavutych Arena, Zaporizhia
- Referee: Andriy Shandor (Lviv)
- Attendance: 10,500

The 2010 Ukrainian Super Cup became the seventh edition of Ukrainian Super Cup, which is an annual football exhibition game contested by the winners of the previous season's Ukrainian Top League and Ukrainian Cup competitions.

The match was played on 4 July 2010 in Zaporizhia at the Slavutych Arena which was completely rebuilt four years before.

This year the Super Cup was contested by league winner Shakhtar Donetsk and cup winner Tavriya Simferopol. Shakhtar won it by thrashing Crimeans 7–1.

== Match ==
=== Details ===
4 July 2010
20:45

Shakhtar Donetsk	7–1	Tavriya Simferopol
Hladkyi 2', 51'; Jádson 35'; Willian 67'; Adriano 78', 85'; Raț 90'	Report	Feshchuk 32'

Slavutych Arena, Zaporizhia
Attendance: 10,500
Referee: Andriy Shandor (Lviv)

Shakhtar Donetsk	Tavriya Simferopol

GK	30	(Ukraine) Andriy Pyatov
MF	3	(Czech Republic) Tomáš Hübschman	(yellow card) 46'	(substituted off) 58'
MF	7	(Brazil) Fernandinho
MF	8	(Brazil) Jádson		(substituted off) 68'
MF	10	(Brazil) Willian
MF	20	(Brazil) Douglas Costa	(yellow card) 65'
CF	21	(Ukraine) Oleksandr Hladkyi		(substituted off) 70'
DF	26	(Romania) Răzvan Raț	(yellow card) 34'
DF	33	(Croatia) Darijo Srna (c)
DF	36	(Ukraine) Oleksandr Chyzhov
DF	44	(Ukraine) Yaroslav Rakytskyi
Substitutes:
GK	60	(Ukraine) Artem Tetenko
DF	5	(Ukraine) Oleksandr Kucher
CF	9	(Brazil) Luiz Adriano		(substituted in) 70'
MF	14	(Ukraine) Vasyl Kobin
MF	15	(Ukraine) Taras Stepanenko		(substituted in) 58'
MF	23	(Ukraine) Kostyantyn Kravchenko
MF	29	(Brazil) Alex Teixeira
Manager :
	(Romania) Mircea Lucescu

GK	1	(Ukraine) Maksym Startsev
MF	3	(Belarus) Mikalay Kashewski
MF	8	(Ukraine) Andriy Kornyev
CF	9	(Ukraine) Oleksandr Kovpak (c)		(substituted off) 61'
DF	11	(Ukraine) Anton Monakhov	(yellow card) 81'
MF	19	(Ukraine) Ilya Galiuza		(substituted off) 46'
MF	22	(Serbia) Željko Ljubenović
MF	27	(Ukraine) Denys Holaido
CF	28	(Ukraine) Maksym Feshchuk		(substituted off) 71'
DF	30	(Ukraine) Oleh Humenyuk
DF	38	(Ukraine) Oleksiy Kurilov	(yellow card) 41'
Substitutes:
GK	21	(Ukraine) Vitaliy Postranskyi
DF	4	(Ukraine) Andriy Donets
MF	7	(Ukraine) Anton Mukhovykov
CF	10	(Nigeria) Lucky Idahor	(yellow card) 66'	(substituted in) 61'
MF	18	(Ukraine) Ivan Matyazh		(substituted in) 46'
CF	20	(Georgia (country)) Vasil Gigiadze		(substituted in) 71'
CF	24	(Ukraine) Ruslan Platon
Manager :
	(Ukraine) Serhiy Puchkov
