= Jádson =

Brazilian footballer (born 1983)

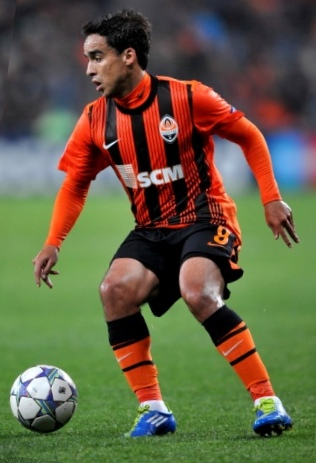
- Jádson playing for Shakhtar Donetsk in 2011

Personal information
- Full name: Jádson Rodrigues da Silva
- Date of birth: 5 October 1983 (age 43)
- Place of birth: Londrina, Brazil
- Height: 1.69 m (5 ft 7 in)
- Position: Attacking midfielder

Senior career*
Years	Team	Apps	(Gls)
2003–2005	Atlético Paranaense	80	(28)
2005–2011	Shakhtar Donetsk	173	(41)
2012–2014	São Paulo	88	(13)
2014–2015	Corinthians	83	(21)
2016	Tianjin Quanjian	29	(6)
2017–2020	Corinthians	104	(15)
2020–2021	Athletico Paranaense	23	(3)
2021	→ Avaí (loan)	9	(0)
2022	Vitória	9	(1)
Total		598	(128)

International career
2011–2013	Brazil	8	(1)
- * Club domestic league appearances and goals

Jádson Rodrigues da Silva (born 5 October 1983), commonly known as Jádson (Brazilian Portuguese: [ˈʒadsõ]), is a Brazilian former professional footballer who played as an attacking midfielder.

Having begun his career at Atlético Paranaense, he moved to Shakhtar Donetsk in 2005. In eight seasons at the club, he won six Ukrainian Premier League titles, three Ukrainian Cup, and the UEFA Cup in 2009. He then returned to Brazil, first to São Paulo, before switching to Corinthians as part of a swap with Alexandre Pato.

Jádson made his international debut for Brazil in 2011, representing the nation at that year's Copa América. He was also part of their squad which won the 2013 FIFA Confederations Cup on home soil.

== Club career ==
=== Atlético Paranaense ===
Born in Londrina, Jádson began his career playing for Atlético Paranaense in Brazil, where he helped the squad to win two Paranaense Championships (2002, 2005) and to be runners-up in the Brazilian league (2004).

=== Shakhtar Donetsk ===
In 2005, Jádson sealed a transfer to Shakhtar Donetsk. He scored the winning goal in extra time for Shakhtar in a 2–1 victory to win the 2009 UEFA Cup Final against Werder Bremen in Istanbul and was named Man of the match, as well as having previously scored 3 goals in the competition (a total of four in the UEFA Cup) and four goals in the Champions League including a hat-trick against FC Basel, to bring his total to nine goals in European competitions in 2008–09. He almost joined Arsenal during the summer in 2011.

=== São Paulo ===
After seven years in Ukraine, Jádson returned to Brazil in early 2012. He was bought for €4 million by São Paulo FC.

=== Corinthians ===
On 5 February 2014, Jádson was involved in a transaction between São Paulo and Corinthians in which he was traded to the latter and Alexandre Pato transferred to São Paulo. Eleven days after signing, on his debut for Corithians, in a 1–1 draw against rival Palmeiras, Jádson left the game to applause, substituted by Renato Augusto, and said the following words: "I am very happy to wear Corinthians' number 10 shirt. Great names of football, as Neto and Rivellino, already wore this number in the club's shirt. The fans can be certain I'll play the best I can."

=== Retirement ===
Jádson announced his retirement from football on the night of 22 August 2022, during an interview with SBT.

== International career ==
Jádson made his international debut for Brazil on 9 February 2011, coming off the bench in a 1–0 loss to France. Jádson was called up to the Brazil squad for the 2011 Copa América held in Argentina. He was an unused substitute in their disappointing 0–0 draw against Venezuela in the first game. However, he started the following match against Paraguay, replacing Robinho on the right wing after the former's limp display against Venezuela. He opened up the scoring with a long range shot, with Brazil eventually salvaging a 2–2 draw in the 89th minute.

Jadson also was called up for the 2013 FIFA Confederations Cup on home soil. He made one appearance in the tournament, coming on as a 73rd-minute substitute for Hulk in the final, a 3–0 win over Spain.

== Style of play ==
Jádson is known for his technical ability, passing, scoring threat and ability to use both feet.

== Career statistics ==
=== Club ===
As of match played 21 April 2022

Appearances and goals by club, season and competition
Club	Season	League			State league (Note: Includes Campeonato Paranaense, Campeonato Paulista, Campeonato Baiano)		National cup (Note: Includes Ukrainian Cup, Copa do Brasil)		Continental		Other		Total	
Club	Season	Division	Apps	Goals	Apps	Goals	Apps	Goals	Apps	Goals	Apps	Goals	Apps	Goals
Atlético Paranaense	2003	Série A	26	6	0	0	0	0	—		—		26	6
Atlético Paranaense	2004	Série A	39	15	15	7	—		—		—		54	22
Atlético Paranaense	Total		65	21	15	7	0	0	—		—		80	28
Shakhtar	2004–05	Vyshcha Liha	15	6	—		2	0	3 (Note: Appearances in UEFA Cup)	0	—		20	6
Shakhtar	2005–06	Vyshcha Liha	22	7	—		2	0	6 (Note: Two appearances in UEFA Champions League, four appearances in UEFA Cup)	0	1 (Note: Appearance in Ukrainian Super Cup)	0	31	7
Shakhtar	2006–07	Vyshcha Liha	22	3	—		4	1	12 (Note: Eight appearances and one goal in UEFA Champions League, four appearances in UEFA Cup)	1	1	0	39	5
Shakhtar	2007–08	Vyshcha Liha	27	7	—		2	2	10 (Note: Appearances in UEFA Champions League)	1	1	0	40	10
Shakhtar	2008–09	Ukrainian Premier League	26	1	—		3	1	16 (Note: Seven appearances and five goals in UEFA Champions League, nine appearances and four goals in UEFA Cup)	9	1	0	46	11
Shakhtar	2009–10	Ukrainian Premier League	26	9	—		4	0	12 (Note: Two appearances in UEFA Champions League, ten appearances and three goals in UEFA Europa League)	3	1 (Note: Appearance in UEFA Super Cup)	0	43	12
Shakhtar	2010–11	Ukrainian Premier League	24	5	—		3	0	10	2	1	1	38	8
Shakhtar	2011–12	Ukrainian Premier League	11	3	—		2	0	4	1	—		17	4
Shakhtar	Total		173	41	—		22	4	73	17	6	1	274	63
São Paulo	2012	Série A	35	5	17	2	7	1	10 (Note: Appearances in Copa Sudamericana)	2	—		69	10
São Paulo	2013	Série A	21	1	14	5	—		12 (Note: Nine appearances and four goals in Copa Libertadores, three appearances and one goal in Copa Sudamericana)	5	1 (Note: Appearance in Recopa Sudamericana)	0	48	11
São Paulo	2014	Série A	0	0	1	0	—		—		—		1	0
São Paulo	Total		56	6	32	7	7	1	22	7	1	0	118	21
Corinthians	2014	Série A	30	4	7	3	5	0	—		—		42	7
Corinthians	2015	Série A	34	13	12	1	1	0	10 (Note: Appearances in Copa Libertadores)	2	—		57	16
Corinthians	Total		64	17	19	4	6	0	10	2	—		99	23
Tianjin Quanjian	2016	Chinese Super League	29	6	—		—		—		—		29	6
Corinthians	2017	Série A	29	6	11	2	4	0	4	2	—		48	10
Corinthians	2018	Série A	25	4	11	3	8	2	7	6	—		51	15
Corinthians	2019	Série A	18	0	10	0	5	1	5	0	—		38	1
Corinthians	Total		72	10	32	5	17	3	16	8	—		137	26
Athletico Paranaense	2020	Série A	9	0	—		—		—		—		9	0
Athletico Paranaense	2021	Série A	9	2	5	1	2	0	5	0	—		21	3
Athletico Paranaense	Total		18	2	5	1	2	0	5	0	—		30	3
Avaí (loan)	2021	Série B	9	0	0	0	0	0	—		—		9	0
Vitória	2022	Série C	0	0	9	1	3	1	—		—		12	2
Career total			486	103	112	25	57	9	126	34	7	1	788	172

=== International ===
Scores and results list Brazil's goal tally first.

#	Date	Venue	Opponent	Score	Result	Competition
1.	9 July 2011	Estadio Mario Alberto Kempes, Córdoba, Argentina	Paraguay	1–0	2–2	2011 Copa América

== Honours ==
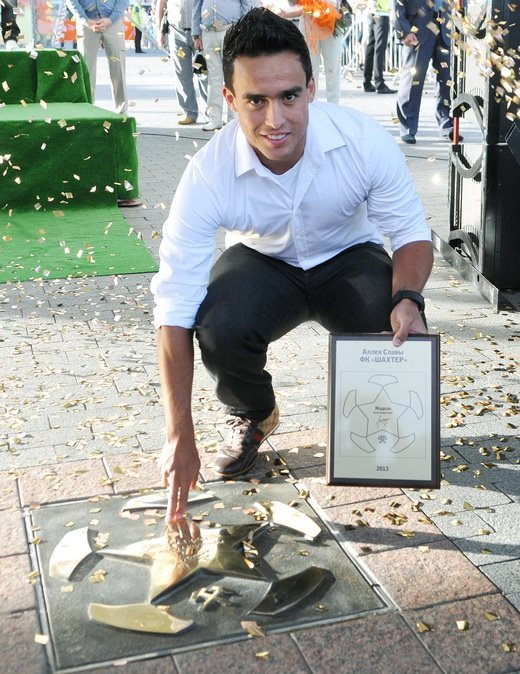
Jádson at a star laid in his honour by Shakhtar

Shakhtar Donetsk

- Vyshcha Liha/Ukrainian Premier League: 2004–05, 2005–06, 2007–08, 2009–10, 2010–11, 2011–12
- Ukrainian Cup: 2007–08, 2010–11, 2011–12
- Ukrainian Super Cup: 2005, 2008, 2010
- UEFA Cup: 2008–09

São Paulo

- Copa Sudamericana: 2012

Corinthians

- Campeonato Brasileiro Série A: 2015, 2017
- Campeonato Paulista: 2017, 2018, 2019

Tianjin Quanjian

- China League One: 2016

Brazil

- FIFA Confederations Cup: 2013

Individual

- Campeonato Brasileiro Série A Team of the Year: 2015
- Campeonato Brasileiro Série A top assist provider: 2015
- Best Player in Brazil: 2015
- Best Attacking Midfielder in Brazil: 2015
