= Vasyl Kobin =

Ukrainian footballer

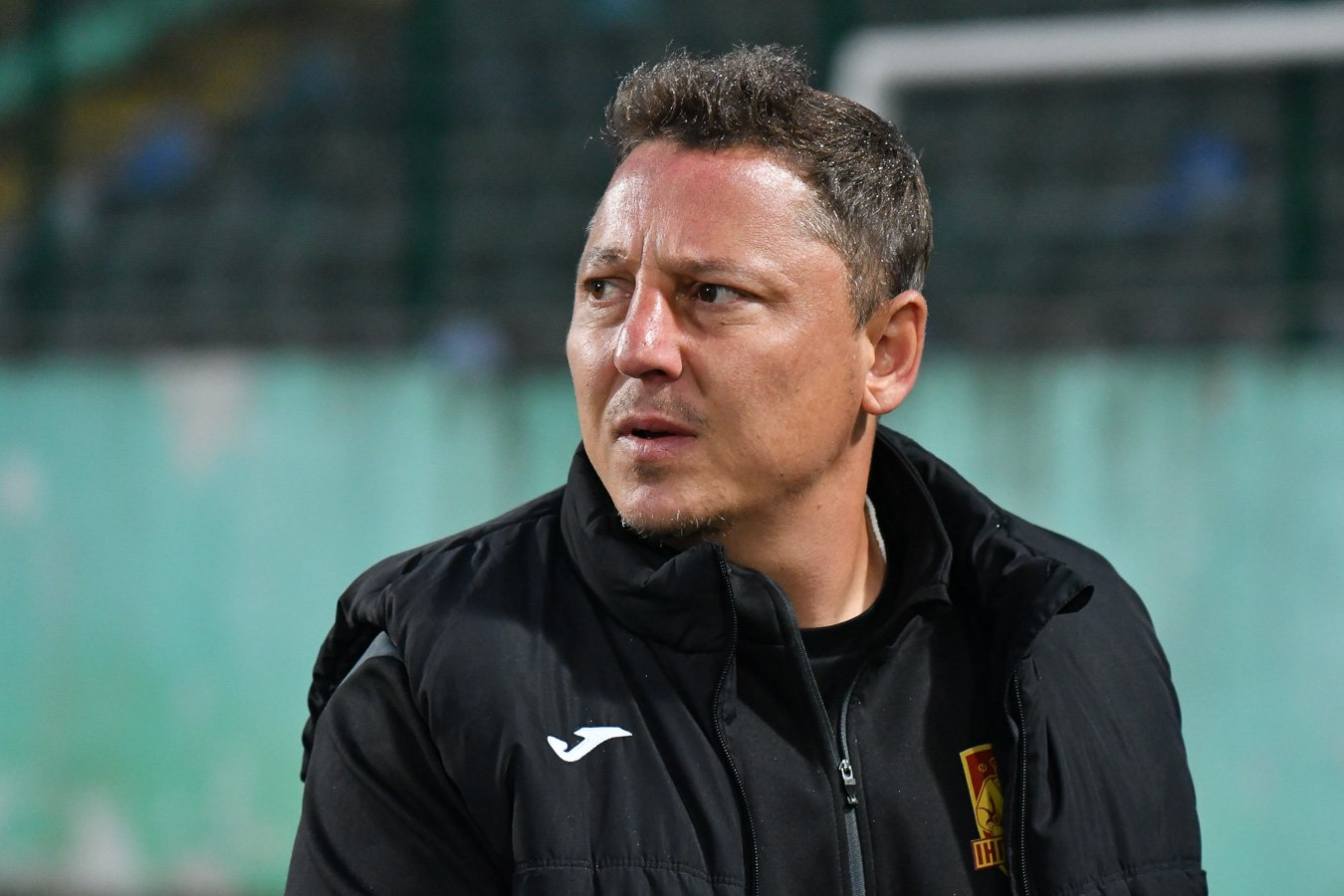
- Kobin in 2024

Personal information
- Full name: Vasyl Vasyl'ovych Kobin
- Date of birth: 24 May 1985 (age 41)
- Place of birth: Strabychovo, Zakarpattia Oblast, Ukrainian SSR
- Height: 1.79 m (5 ft 10 1/2 in)
- Positions: Right back; right winger

Team information
- Current team: Rukh Lviv U17 (manager)

Youth career
- 1998–2001: Zakarpattia Uzhhorod

Senior career*
Years	Team	Apps	(Gls)
2001–2006	Zakarpattia Uzhhorod	74	(3)
2001–2002	→ Zakarpattia-2 Uzhhorod	15	(1)
2006–2009	Karpaty Lviv	83	(9)
2009–2017	Shakhtar Donetsk	56	(1)
2014	→ Metalist Kharkiv (loan)	9	(0)
2015	→ Shakhtyor Soligorsk (loan)	11	(1)
2017	Veres Rivne	16	(2)
2018	Tobol	8	(0)
2018	Mynai	13	(2)
Total		284	(19)

International career
2005–2009	Ukraine U21	1	(0)
2009–2011	Ukraine	11	(0)

Managerial career
- 2019–2021: Mynai
- 2021: Mynai
- 2024–2026: Inhulets Petrove
- 2026–: Rukh Lviv U17
- * Club domestic league appearances and goals

Vasyl Kobin (Ukrainian: Василь Васильович Кобін; born 24 May 1985) is a Ukrainian professional football manager and former player who played as a midfielder. He currently manages Rukh Lviv's under-17 team.

== Career ==
He played for the club Zakarpattia Uzhhorod before joining Karpaty Lviv. On 19 June 2009 Shakhtar Donetsk officially signed the right wingback from Karpaty Lviv, he left Lviv after three seasons with 131 appearances and 11 goals in the league.

On 7 February 2018, Kobin signed for FC Tobol. Kobin played 9 games for Tobol before being released by mutual agreement on 30 June 2018.

== Statistic ==
As of 24 March 2021

Appearances and goals by club, season and competition
Club	Season	League			Cup		Europe		Super Cup		Total	
Club	Season	Tier	Apps	Goals	Apps	Goals	Apps	Goals	Apps	Goals	Apps	Goals
Zakarpattia-2	2001–02	3	15	1	–		–		–		15	1
Total			15	1	0	0	0	0	0	0	15	1
Zakarpattia	2002–03	2	6	0	–		–		–		6	0
Zakarpattia	2003–04	2	21	1	–		–		–		21	1
Zakarpattia	2004–05	1	27	2	1	0	–		–		28	2
Zakarpattia	2005–06	1	20	0	1	0	–		–		21	0
Total			74	3	2	0	0	0	0	0	76	3
Karpaty	2006–07	1	28	2	1	0	–		–		29	2
Karpaty	2007–08	1	27	4	–		–		–		27	4
Karpaty	2008–09	1	28	3	1	0	–		–		29	3
Total			83	9	2	0	0	0	0	0	85	9
Shakhtar	2009–10	1	24	1	2	1	7	1	–		33	3
Shakhtar	2010–11	1	9	0	3	0	2	0	–		14	0
Shakhtar	2011–12	1	7	0	2	0	1	0	–		10	0
Shakhtar	2012–13	1	5	0	–		–		–		5	0
Shakhtar	2013–14	1	3	0	2	1	–		–		5	1
Shakhtar	2015–16	1	6	0	4	1	1	0	–		11	1
Shakhtar	2016–17	1	2	0	–		–		–		2	0
Total			56	1	13	3	11	1	0	0	80	5
Metalist (loan)	2014–15	1	9	0	2	0	6	1	–		17	1
Total			9	0	2	0	6	1	0	0	17	1
Shakhtyor (loan)	2015	(Belarus) 1	11	1	4	0	–		–		15	1
Total			11	1	4	0	0	0	0	0	15	1
Veres	2017–18	1	16	2	2	0	–		–		18	2
Total			16	2	2	0	0	0	0	0	18	2
Tobol	2018	(Kazakhstan) 1	8	0	1	0	–		–		9	0
Total			8	0	1	0	0	0	0	0	9	0
Mynai	2018–19	3	13	2	3	1	–		–		16	3
Total			13	2	3	1	0	0	0	0	16	3
Career total			285	19	29	4	17	2	0	0	331	25

=== International ===
Appearances and goals by national team and year
National team	Year	Apps	Goals
Ukraine
Ukraine	2009	6	0
Ukraine	2010	4	0
Ukraine	2011	1	0
Total		11	0

== Honours ==
Zakarpattya Uzhhorod

- Ukrainian First League: 2003–04

Shakhtar Donetsk

- Ukrainian Premier League: 2009–10, 2010–11, 2011–12, 2012–13, 2013–14, 2016–17
- Ukrainian Cup: 2010–11, 2011–12, 2012–13, 2015–16, 2016–17
- Ukrainian Super Cup: 2010, 2012, 2013, 2014, 2015
