= Răzvan Raț =

Romanian footballer (born 1981)

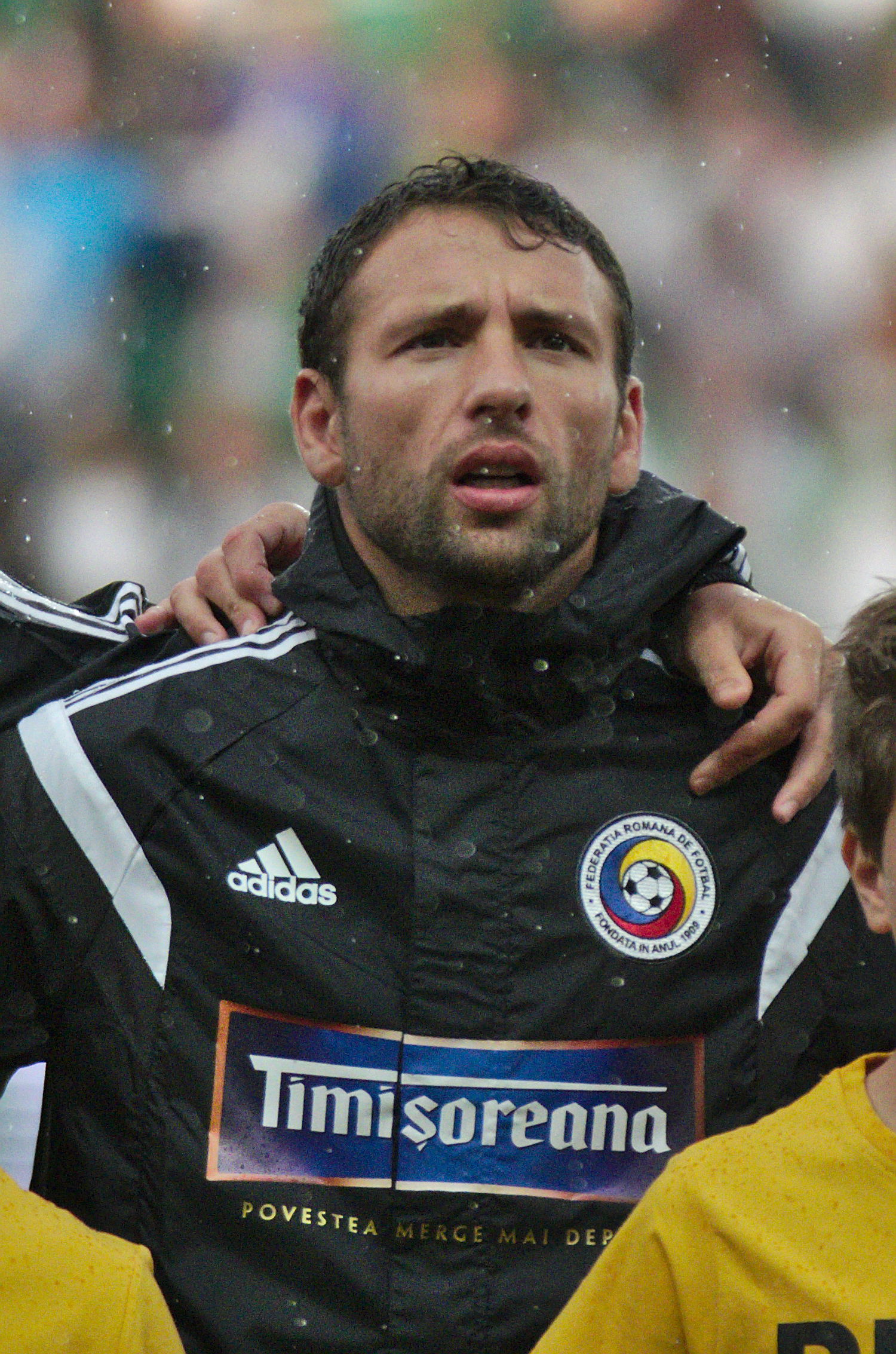
- Raț with Romania in 2014

Personal information
- Full name: Dincă Răzvan Raț
- Date of birth: 26 May 1981 (age 45)
- Place of birth: Piatra-Olt, Romania
- Height: 1.78 m (5 ft 10 in)
- Position: Left-back

Team information
- Current team: Genoa (board member)

Youth career
- 1988–1994: Rapid Piatra-Olt
- 1994: Universitatea Craiova
- 1995: Constructorul Craiova
- 1996: Sporting Pitești
- 1996: Cetatea Târgu Neamț
- 1996–1998: Sporting Pitești

Senior career*
| Years | Team | Apps | (Gls) |
| 1998–2003 | Rapid București | 83 | (4) |
| 2000–2001 | → FCM Bacău (loan) | 14 | (2) |
| 2003–2013 | Shakhtar Donetsk | 174 | (6) |
| 2013–2014 | West Ham United | 15 | (0) |
| 2014 | Rayo Vallecano | 10 | (0) |
| 2014–2015 | PAOK | 30 | (3) |
| 2015–2018 | Rayo Vallecano | 26 | (0) |
| 2018 | ACS Poli Timișoara | 10 | (0) |
| Total | | 362 | (15) |

International career
| 1999–2002 | Romania U21 | 16 | (0) |
| 2002–2016 | Romania | 113 | (2) |
- * Club domestic league appearances and goals

Dincă Răzvan Raț (Romanian pronunciation: [rəzˈvan ˈrat͡s]; born 26 May 1981) is a Romanian former professional footballer who played as a left-back, currently board member at Serie A club Genoa.

He made a name for himself in Romania at Rapid București, with whom he won two national titles, one national cup and one supercup between 1998 and 2003. The latter year, Raț moved to Shakhtar Donetsk of Ukraine, where he won 15 domestic titles and one UEFA Cup over the course of ten seasons. In 2009, he came second in voting for the Romanian Footballer of the Year award. He also represented West Ham United, Rayo Vallecano, PAOK and ACS Poli Timișoara before retiring in 2018.

Raț made his full debut for the Romania national team in 2002. He represented the nation in two UEFA European Championships. Raț is the fourth-most capped Romanian international of all time, earning his 100th match in October 2014.

He is a board member for the Serie A club Genoa.

== Club career ==
=== Early career ===
Born in Piatra-Olt, Raț began his football career when he joined the local team Rapid Piatra-Olt aged seven in a team trained by his father. In the summer of 1994, Raț went on a trial with Universitatea Craiova. He impressed coach Anghel Mităchescu and joined the club's youth system at age 13. When Mităchescu found out that he was going to be released from his duties by club president Rodion Cămătaru, he transferred the entire junior squad at the Divizia B side Constructorul Craiova. Raț's career for Constructorul, however, ended shortly after due to the club's financial problems, in 1995. In the winter of that year, Raț was noticed by Tudorel Stoica, who attended a futsall tournament held in Balș. Stoica wanted Raț to join Steaua București's youth system. Despite both Stoica and youth coach Bujor Hălmăgean being impressed by the young player, Raț never joined Steaua because according to his father, the club refused to pay the youth, Raț being forced to support himself in Bucharest. Taking advice from his former coach Mităchescu, Raț joined Sporting Pitești, the team trained by former international player Nicolae Dobrin. In his first match, Raț was substituted for the last 10–15 minutes of the game after he had scored five or six goals.

On 2 September 1996, after being noticed by Silviu Stănescu, Raț joined Divizia B side Cetatea Târgu Neamț. Despite being only 15 years old, Raț trained with the senior squad. On 19 November, the arrest of Cetatea's main sponsor led to the dissolution of Cetatea Târgu Neamț. Raț getting the chance to play only two matches for the juniors of Cetatea. He later rejoined Sporting Pitești.

In June 1998, Mircea Lucescu noticed Raț, and he signed his first professional contract with Rapid București on 26 June. He made his Divizia A debut on 21 April 1999 in the 4–1 victory against Ceahlăul Piatra Neamț.

=== Shakhtar Donetsk ===
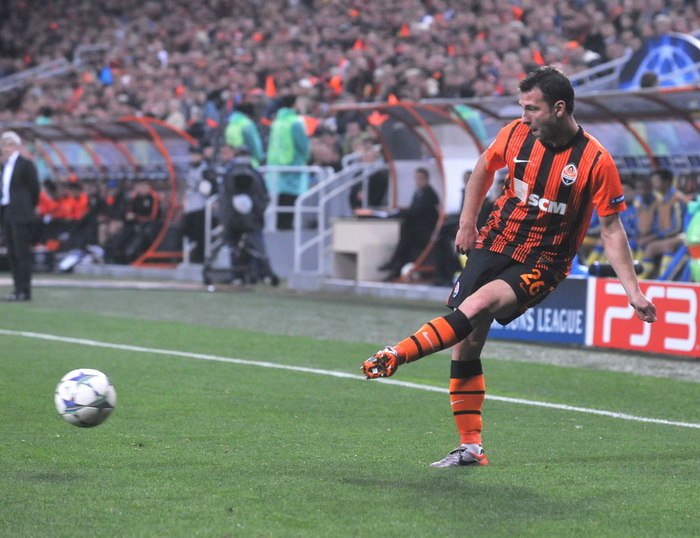
Raț with Shakhtar in 2011

In 2003, Raț was signed by Ukrainian club Shakhtar Donetsk, where he became a key player. He played the whole game as Donetsk won the 2009 UEFA Cup Final.

=== West Ham United ===
On 21 May 2013, Raț signed for English Premier League club West Ham United on a free transfer on a one-year contract, with the option to extend it. His West Ham debut came on 27 August 2013 in a League Cup game against Cheltenham Town in which West Ham won the game 2–1.

On 31 January 2014, Raț was released from his contract with West Ham by mutual consent. He had played 20 games in all competitions without scoring.

=== Late career ===
On 13 February 2014, Raț joined Spanish La Liga side Rayo Vallecano until the end of the 2013–14 season. On 15 June 2014, PAOK announced they had made a verbal agreement with Raț, who signed a two-year contract at the Super League Greece club.

On 20 August 2015, Raț returned to Rayo Vallecano after agreeing to a two-year deal. On 31 January 2018, after making no appearances during the campaign, he cut ties with the club. On 22 March 2018, Raț returned to Romania with ACS Poli Timișoara, totalling ten games before retiring.

== International career ==
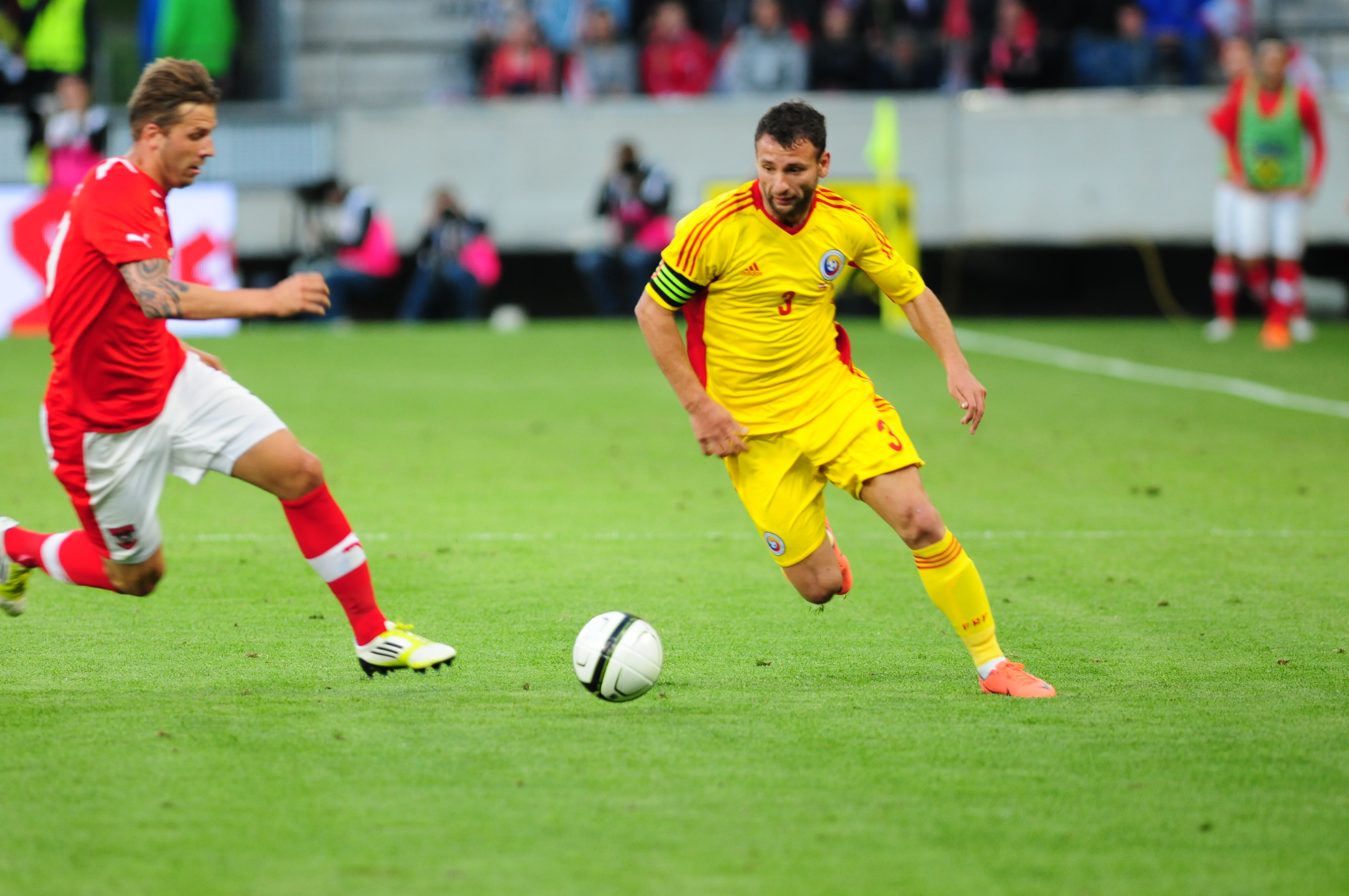
Raț during a friendly game against Austria in 2012

On 8 February 2002, Raț was called up to the Romania national team for the first time. Five days later, he made the starting lineup in his full debut in a Friendly against reigning world and European champions France. Raț played his first official match on 12 October, in a Euro 2004 qualifier match against Norway, playing as a left midfielder. Following the rise of Cristian Chivu in becoming first-choice in central defence, Raț became the first-choice left back for Romania. On 28 April 2004, Raț scored his first goal for the national squad in a 5–1 win against Germany in the worst away defeat for Germany in the past 65 years. On 31 May 2014, Raț scored only his second goal for Romania, but it was the winning goal in a 1–0 victory against Albania in a match played in Yverdon-les-Bains, Switzerland. In 2008, Raț made the squad for the UEFA Euro 2008 tournament. He helped Romania to a 0–0 draw against previous FIFA World Cup finalists France and a 1–1 draw against world champions Italy in the so-called "group of death". Romania, however, were eliminated after a 2–0 loss to the Netherlands. Raț earned his 100th cap for Romania on 14 October 2014 in a 2–0 victory away to Finland in UEFA Euro 2016 qualifying.

== Career statistics ==
=== Club ===
Appearances and goals by club, season and competition
| Club | Season | League | | | National cup (Note: Includes Cupa României, Ukrainian Cup, Greek Cup) | | League cup (Note: Includes EFL Cup) | | Europe | | Other | | Total | | Ref. |
| Club | Season | Division | Apps | Goals | Apps | Goals | Apps | Goals | Apps | Goals | Apps | Goals | Apps | Goals | Ref. |
|---|---|---|---|---|---|---|---|---|---|---|---|---|---|---|---|
| Rapid București | 1998–99 | Divizia A | 3 | 0 | | | – | | 0 | 0 | 0 | 0 | 3 | 0 | |
| Rapid București | 1999–00 | Divizia A | 20 | 1 | | | – | | 0 | 0 | – | | 20 | 1 | |
| Rapid București | 2000–01 | Divizia A | 5 | 0 | | | – | | 1 (Note: Appearances in UEFA Cup) | 0 | – | | 6 | 0 | |
| Rapid București | 2001–02 | Divizia A | 27 | 1 | 1 | 0 | – | | 3 | 0 | – | | 30 | 1 | |
| Rapid București | 2002–03 | Divizia A | 28 | 2 | 1 | 0 | – | | 4 | 0 | 1 (Note: Appearance in Supercupa României) | 0 | 34 | 2 | |
| Rapid București | Total | | 83 | 4 | 2 | 0 | – | | 8 | 0 | 1 | 0 | 94 | 4 | – |
| FCM Bacău (loan) | 2000–01 | Divizia A | 14 | 2 | – | | – | | – | | – | | 14 | 2 | |
| Shakhtar Donetsk | 2003–04 | Vyshcha Liha | 27 | 1 | 6 | 0 | – | | 6 (Note: Four appearances in UEFA Champions League, two appearances in UEFA Cup) | 0 | – | | 39 | 1 | |
| Shakhtar Donetsk | 2004–05 | Vyshcha Liha | 20 | 2 | 5 | 0 | – | | 10 (Note: Six appearances in UEFA Champions League, four appearances in UEFA Cup) | 0 | 1 (Note: Appearances in Ukrainian Super Cup) | 0 | 36 | 2 | |
| Shakhtar Donetsk | 2005–06 | Vyshcha Liha | 18 | 0 | 2 | 0 | – | | 10 (Note: Two appearances in UEFA Champions League, eight appearances in UEFA Cup) | 0 | 1 | 0 | 31 | 0 | |
| Shakhtar Donetsk | 2006–07 | Vyshcha Liha | 14 | 0 | 3 | 0 | – | | 9 (Note: Eight appearances in UEFA Champions League, one appearance in UEFA Cup) | 0 | 1 | 0 | 27 | 0 | |
| Shakhtar Donetsk | 2007–08 | Vyshcha Liha | 19 | 2 | 4 | 1 | – | | 10 (Note: Appearances in UEFA Champions League) | 0 | 1 | 0 | 34 | 3 | |
| Shakhtar Donetsk | 2008–09 | Ukrainian Premier League | 17 | 0 | 2 | 1 | – | | 13 (Note: Five appearances in UEFA Champions League, eight appearances in UEFA Cup) | 0 | 1 | 0 | 33 | 1 | |
| Shakhtar Donetsk | 2009–10 | Ukrainian Premier League | 18 | 1 | 2 | 0 | – | | 10 (Note: One appearance in UEFA Champions League, nine appearances in UEFA Europa League) | 0 | 1 (Note: Appearance in UEFA Super Cup) | 0 | 31 | 1 | |
| Shakhtar Donetsk | 2010–11 | Ukrainian Premier League | 17 | 0 | 1 | 0 | – | | 9 | 1 | 1 | 1 | 28 | 2 | |
| Shakhtar Donetsk | 2011–12 | Ukrainian Premier League | 8 | 0 | 3 | 0 | – | | 4 | 0 | 0 | 0 | 15 | 0 | |
| Shakhtar Donetsk | 2012–13 | Ukrainian Premier League | 16 | 0 | 1 | 0 | – | | 8 | 0 | 1 | 0 | 26 | 0 | |
| Shakhtar Donetsk | Total | | 174 | 6 | 29 | 2 | – | | 89 | 1 | 8 | 1 | 300 | 10 | – |
| West Ham United | 2013–14 | Premier League | 15 | 0 | 0 | 0 | 5 | 0 | – | | – | | 20 | 0 | |
| Rayo Vallecano | 2013–14 | La Liga | 10 | 0 | – | | – | | – | | – | | 10 | 0 | |
| PAOK | 2014–15 | Super League Greece | 30 | 3 | 2 | 0 | – | | 7 (Note: Appearances in UEFA Europa League) | 0 | – | | 39 | 3 | |
| PAOK | 2015–16 | Super League Greece | – | | – | | – | | 2 | 0 | – | | 2 | 0 | |
| PAOK | Total | | 30 | 3 | 2 | 0 | – | | 9 | 0 | – | | 41 | 3 | – |
| Rayo Vallecano | 2015–16 | La Liga | 10 | 0 | 0 | 0 | – | | – | | – | | 10 | 0 | |
| Rayo Vallecano | 2016–17 | Segunda División | 16 | 0 | 0 | 0 | – | | – | | – | | 16 | 0 | |
| Rayo Vallecano | 2017–18 | Segunda División | 0 | 0 | 0 | 0 | – | | – | | – | | 0 | 0 | |
| Rayo Vallecano | Total | | 26 | 0 | 0 | 0 | – | | – | | – | | 26 | 0 | – |
| ACS Poli Timișoara | 2017–18 | Liga I | 10 | 0 | – | | – | | – | | – | | 10 | 0 | |
| Career total | | | 362 | 15 | 33 | 2 | 5 | 0 | 106 | 1 | 9 | 1 | 515 | 19 | – |

=== International ===
Appearances and goals by national team and year
| National team | Year | Apps | Goals |
|---|---|---|---|
| Romania | 2002 | 5 | 0 |
| Romania | 2003 | 9 | 0 |
| Romania | 2004 | 7 | 1 |
| Romania | 2005 | 8 | 0 |
| Romania | 2006 | 7 | 0 |
| Romania | 2007 | 10 | 0 |
| Romania | 2008 | 7 | 0 |
| Romania | 2009 | 9 | 0 |
| Romania | 2010 | 8 | 0 |
| Romania | 2011 | 9 | 0 |
| Romania | 2012 | 7 | 0 |
| Romania | 2013 | 8 | 0 |
| Romania | 2014 | 8 | 1 |
| Romania | 2015 | 6 | 0 |
| Romania | 2016 | 5 | 0 |
| Total | | 113 | 2 |

Scores and results list Romania's goal tally first, score column indicates score after each Raț goal.

List of international goals scored by Răzvan Raț
| No. | Date | Venue | Opponent | Score | Result | Competition |
|---|---|---|---|---|---|---|
| 1 | 28 April 2004 | Stadionul Giulești-Valentin Stănescu, Bucharest, Romania | Germany | 2–0 | 5–1 | Friendly |
| 2 | 31 May 2014 | Stade Municipal, Yverdon-les-Bains, Switzerland | Albania | 1–0 | 1–0 | Friendly |

== Honours ==
Rapid București

- Divizia A: 1998–99, 2002–03
- Cupa României: 2001–02
- Supercupa României: 1999, 2002

Shakhtar Donetsk

- Ukrainian Premier League: 2004–05, 2005–06, 2007–08, 2009–10, 2010–11, 2011–12, 2012–13
- Ukrainian Cup: 2003–04, 2007–08, 2010–11, 2011–12, 2012–13
- Ukrainian Super Cup: 2005, 2008, 2010,2012
- UEFA Cup: 2008–09

Individual

- Gazeta Sporturilor Romanian Footballer of the Year runner-up: 2009; third place: 2010, 2014

== See also ==
- List of men's footballers with 100 or more international caps
