= Tomáš Hübschman =

Czech footballer

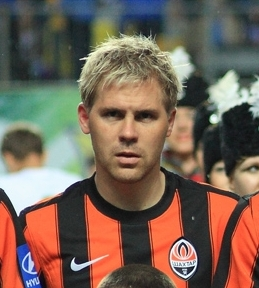
- Hübschman with Shakhtar Donetsk in 2011

Personal information
- Full name: Tomáš Hübschman
- Date of birth: 4 September 1981 (age 45)
- Place of birth: Prague, Czechoslovakia
- Height: 1.80 m (5 ft 11 in)
- Positions: Centre back; defensive midfielder

Youth career
- 1986–1998: Sparta Prague

Senior career*
Years	Team	Apps	(Gls)
1999	Zlín	6	(0)
1999–2004	Sparta Prague	81	(0)
2000–2001	→ Jablonec (loan)	29	(0)
2004–2014	Shakhtar Donetsk	167	(4)
2014–2024	Jablonec	258	(6)

International career^{‡}
2001–2003	Czech Republic U21	8	(0)
2001–2014	Czech Republic	58	(1)

Managerial career
- 2025-2026: MFK Ružomberok (Sport Dir.)
Medal record
Men's football
Representing Czech Republic
UEFA European Championship
Bronze medal – third place	2004 Portugal
UEFA European Under-21 Championship
Winner	2002 Switzerland
- * Club domestic league appearances and goals as of 21 June 2024 ‡ National team caps and goals as of 5 January 2016

Tomáš Hübschman (Czech pronunciation: [ˈtomaːʃ ˈɦɪpʃman]; born 4 September 1981) is a Czech former professional footballer.

== Club career ==
During an April 2012 Ukrainian derby, Hübschman put in a man of the match performance in midfield to help his side defeat Dynamo Kyiv 2–0, a result which drew Shakhtar level on points in the league. The previous month, Hübschmann scored his first Ukrainian Premier League goal in two seasons to help the Miners defeat Illichivets Mariupol 2–1.

In July 2014, Hübschman returned to FK Jablonec 13 years after his lone spell with the club, signing a three-year contract. On 5 April 2023, Hübschman's goal determined the 1–1 draw against 1. FC Slovácko, raising the record for the oldest scorer to 41 years, 7 months, 1 day of age. On 30 April 2023 Hübschman's record was overcome by Josef Jindřišek.

On 18 June 2024, Hübschman announced his retirement from professional football.

== International career ==
Hübschman has represented the Czech Republic at various youth levels and captained his country's under-20 team at the 2001 FIFA World Youth Championship. He was also part of the Czech side which won the UEFA U-21 Championships in 2002.

On 18 November 2001, Hübschman debuted for the Czech senior squad in 0–1 2002 FIFA World Cup qualification loss against Belgium. Hübschman played for the senior team at UEFA Euro 2004 and in 2006 FIFA World Cup qualification, but was not part of main squad when the Czech Republic qualified for the latter final tournament.

== Career statistics ==
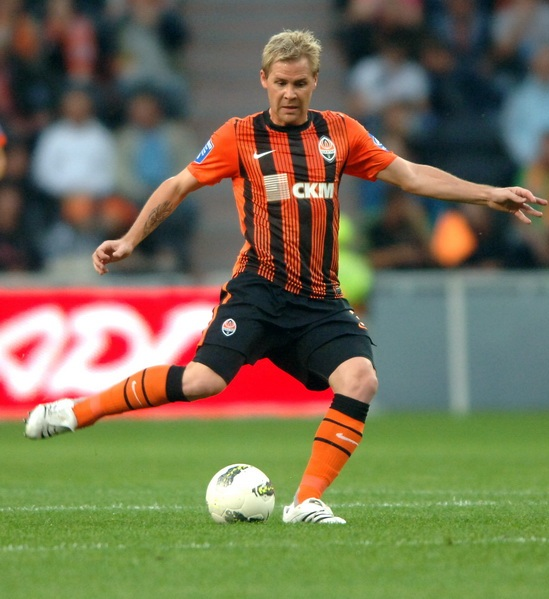
Hübschman playing for Shakhtar in 2011

=== Club ===
As of 21 July 2013

Club	Season	League			National Cup		Europe		Other		Total	
Club	Season	Division	Apps	Goals	Apps	Goals	Apps	Goals	Apps	Goals	Apps	Goals
Jablonec	2000–01	Czech First League	29	0			–		–		29	0
Sparta Prague	2001–02	Czech First League	27	0			11	0	–		38	0
Sparta Prague	2002–03	Czech First League	29	0			–		–		29	0
Sparta Prague	2003–04	Czech First League	25	0			–		–		25	0
Sparta Prague	Total		81	0			11	0	–		92	0
Shakhtar Donetsk	2004–05	Vyshcha Liha	21	1	4	0	10	1	–		35	2
Shakhtar Donetsk	2005–06	Vyshcha Liha	16	0	2	1	6	0	1	0	25	1
Shakhtar Donetsk	2006–07	Vyshcha Liha	17	0	4	0	7	1	1	0	29	1
Shakhtar Donetsk	2007–08	Vyshcha Liha	19	0	6	1	7	0	–		32	1
Shakhtar Donetsk	2008–09	Ukrainian Premier League	22	1	3	0	14	1	1	0	40	2
Shakhtar Donetsk	2009–10	Ukrainian Premier League	18	0	1	0	1	1	–		30	1
Shakhtar Donetsk	2010–11	Ukrainian Premier League	14	0	5	0	2	0	1	0	28	0
Shakhtar Donetsk	2011–12	Ukrainian Premier League	20	1	1	0	1	0	1	0	28	1
Shakhtar Donetsk	2012–13	Ukrainian Premier League	9	0	3	0	6	0	1	0	18	0
Shakhtar Donetsk	2013–14	Ukrainian Premier League	4	0	1	0	–		1	0	5	0
Shakhtar Donetsk	Total		158	3	29	2	75	4	6	0	268	9
Career total			268	3	29	2	86	4	6	0	389	9

== Honours ==
Sparta Prague

- Czech First League: 1999–2000, 2002–03
- Czech Cup: 2003–04

Shakhtar Donetsk

- Vyshcha Liha/Ukrainian Premier League: 2004–05, 2005–06, 2007–08, 2009–10, 2010–11, 2011–12, 2012–13, 2013–14
- Ukrainian Cup: 2007–08, 2010–11, 2011–12, 2012–13
- Ukrainian Super Cup: 2005, 2008, 2010, 2012, 2013
- UEFA Cup: 2008–09

Individual

- Czech First League Figure of the Season: 2020–21
