= 2003–04 Ukrainian First League =

Ukrainian First League
- Season: 2003–04
- Champions: Zakarpattia Uzhhorod
- Promoted: Zakarpattia Uzhhorod, Metalist Kharkiv
- Relegated: Karpaty-2 Lviv, Boreks-Borysfen Borodianka
- Top goalscorer: (15) Oleksandr Aliev (Dynamo-2)

The 2003–04 Ukrainian First League was the thirteenth season of the Ukrainian First League (football) which was won by Zakarpattia Uzhhorod. The season started on July 18, 2003, and finished on June 18, 2004.

== Promotion and relegation ==
=== Promoted teams ===
Two clubs promoted from the 2002–03 Ukrainian Second League.

Group A

- none

Group B

- Nafkom-Akademiya Irpin – champion (debut)

Group C

- Zorya Luhansk – champion (returning after five seasons)

=== Relegated teams ===
One club was relegated from the 2002-03 Ukrainian Top League:

- Metalist Kharkiv – 14th place (returning after five seasons)

=== Renamed teams ===
- Before the season FC Krasyliv changed to FC Krasyliv-Obolon .
- Before the season FC Vinnytsia changed its name to FC Nyva Vinnytsia.
- During the winter break FC Systema-Boreks Borodianka changed to FC Boreks-Borysfen Borodianka.
- During the second half FC Spartak Sumy changed to FC Spartak-Horobyna Sumy.

=== Teams ===
In 2003-04 season, the Ukrainian First League consists of the following teams:

Locations of teams in First League

== Final table ==
Pos	Team	Pld	W	D	L	GF	GA	GD	Pts	Promotion or relegation
1	Zakarpattia Uzhhorod (C, P)	34	22	4	8	49	27	+22	70	Promoted to Vyshcha Liha
2	Metalist Kharkiv (P)	34	19	9	6	51	24	+27	66	Promoted to Vyshcha Liha
3	Naftovyk-Ukrnafta Okhtyrka	34	17	11	6	52	33	+19	62	
4	Dynamo-2 Kyiv	34	18	5	11	65	35	+30	59	
5	Stal Alchevsk	34	17	7	10	45	27	+18	58	
6	Spartak Ivano-Frankivsk	34	15	10	9	42	38	+4	55	
7	Arsenal Kharkiv	34	15	7	12	41	40	+1	52	
8	Nyva Vinnytsia	34	14	10	10	34	24	+10	52	
9	Spartak-Horobina Sumy	34	11	13	10	40	41	−1	46	
10	Shakhtar-2 Donetsk	34	12	8	14	43	43	0	44	
11	CSKA Kyiv	34	12	6	16	29	39	−10	42	
12	Mykolaiv	34	11	9	14	31	31	0	42	
13	Krasyliv-Obolon Krasyliv	34	10	10	14	35	54	−19	40	
14	Nafkom-Akademia Irpin	34	9	11	14	35	43	−8	38	
15	Zorya Luhansk	34	8	13	13	28	42	−14	37	
16	Karpaty-2 Lviv (R)	34	8	9	17	37	48	−11	33	Relegated to Second League
17	Borex-Borysfen Borodyanka (R)	34	8	5	21	29	52	−23	29	Relegated to Second League
18	Polissya Zhytomyr	34	3	7	24	22	67	−45	16	Avoided relegation

(C) Champions; (P) Promoted; (R) Relegated
- Krasyliv-Obolon Krasyliv 13th 2003/04, farm club for Premier League club Obolon Kyiv, broke operations and merged with FC Podillya Khmelnytskyi. The club is changing its name to Podillya Khmelnytskyi and moving to Khmelnytskyi. FC Podillya Khmelnytskyi finished 2nd in Druha Liha Group A (Western Ukraine) in 2003/04 and will reorganize in amateur level.
- Nafkom-Akademija Irpen 14th 2003/04, moved to Brovary and changed their name to Nafkom Brovary.
- Zirka Kirovohrad 16th Premier League 2003/04 was relegated to First Division, but informed the Ukrainian Football Federation (UFF) that they wished to reorganize their operations, therefore it will enter the 2004/05 competition in Druha Liha B. Nonetheless, the UFF reinstalled FC Polissya Zhytomyr (18th 2003/04) since, the 16th, FC Karpaty-2 Lviv could not remain in First Division, because their senior club was also relegated to Persha Liha, and the 17th Borex-Borysfen Borodyanka also became insolvent and chose to reorganize in the Druha Liha.
- Naftovyk Okhtyrka change their name to Naftovyk-Ukrnafta Okhtyrka July 15, 2004.

Persha Liha 2003-04 Winners
OSC Zakarpattia Uzhhorod
First title

== Top scorers ==
Statistics are taken from here.

Scorer	Goals (pen.)	Team
(Ukraine) Oleksandr Aliyev	16 (2)	Dynamo-2 Kyiv
(Ukraine) Serhiy Pivnenko	15 (5)	Shakhtar-2 Donetsk
(Ukraine) Serhiy Levchenko	13 (1)	Nafkom-Akademia Irpin
(Ukraine) Viktor Matsiuk	12	Zakarpattia Uzhhorod
(Ukraine) Vladyslav Korobkin	11 (4)	FC Krasyliv
(Ukraine) Bohdan Yesyp	10	Naftovyk Okhtyrka
(Ukraine) Volodymyr Melnychenko	10	Naftovyk Okhtyrka
(Ukraine) Artem Starhorodskyi	9	Boreks-Borysfen / Naftovyk
(Ukraine) Serhiy Seleznyov	9 (2)	Metalist Kharkiv
(Ukraine) Oleksiy Yakymenko	9 (4)	Stal A. / Zoria
