= Julius Aghahowa =

Nigerian footballer (born 1982)

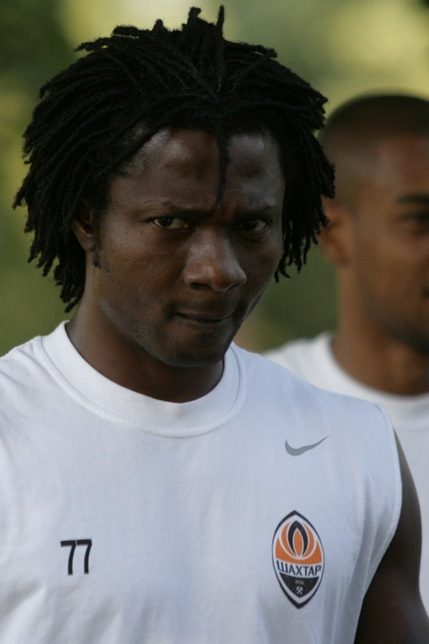
- Aghahowa with Shakhtar Donetsk in 2010

Personal information
- Date of birth: 12 February 1982 (age 44)
- Place of birth: Benin City, Nigeria
- Height: 1.78 m (5 ft 10 in)
- Position: Striker

Youth career
- Police Machines
- Bendel Insurance

Senior career*
Years	Team	Apps	(Gls)
1998–1999	Bendel Insurance		
1999–2000	Espérance		
2000–2007	Shakhtar Donetsk	89	(32)
2001	→ Shakhtar-2 Donetsk	3	(0)
2007–2008	Wigan Athletic	20	(0)
2008–2009	Kayserispor	29	(6)
2009–2012	Shakhtar Donetsk	10	(1)
2010–2011	→ Sevastopol (loan)	10	(1)
Total		161	(40)

International career
2000–2007	Nigeria	32	(14)
2000	Nigeria Olympic	4	(1)
- * Club domestic league appearances and goals

Julius Aghahowa (born 12 February 1982) is a Nigerian former professional footballer who played as a striker.

Aghahowa played in Ukraine, England, and Turkey during his career. Known for his pace and acrobatic goal celebrations, he performed six consecutive backflips after scoring a goal against Sweden at the 2002 FIFA World Cup.

== Club career ==
=== Early career ===
Born in Benin City, Aghahowa began his career with the Police Machines, a local police team, and went on to Bendel Insurance. He signed for Danish lower division team Herning Fremad before the 1999 African Youth Championship, but performed so well there that he wanted to play for a bigger club. He ended up with the Tunisian champions, Espérance, when he procured a contract with the Tunisians which predated the Herning Fremad contract.

=== Shakhtar Donetsk ===
In the middle of the 2000–01 season, Aghahowa transferred to Shakhtar Donetsk, who soon won the Ukrainian league championship. Aghahowa won the game for Shakhtar in the 2006 Ukrainian Championship against Dynamo Kyiv, heading the winner in extra-time, and was named man of the match. His performance in the final has been widely seen as the "saving grace" of his career at Shakhtar, with his future at the club looking bleak earlier in the season. After playing over six years for Shakhtar Donetsk, Aghahowa left for Wigan Athletic.

=== Wigan Athletic ===
His work permit was passed and on 30 January 2007, he signed for Wigan Athletic for an undisclosed fee, playing his first Premiership match for them against Portsmouth on 3 February. Aghahowa did not score for Wigan in one and a half years and on 20 June 2008, he signed for Kayserispor.

=== Return to Shakhtar Donetsk ===
On 4 July 2009, Shakhtar Donetsk signed Aghahowa on a free transfer after he was released by Kayserispor. He had already played for Shakhtar from 2000 to 2007 and declared a great desire to play for his old club. However, he could not find himself as a regular starter and was loaned out to Sevastopol at the beginning of the 2010–11 season. He was released at the end of the 2011–12 season, announcing his retirement from the game in April 2013.

== International career ==
Although he played for the U-20 team at the FIFA World Youth Championship in 1999, Aghahowa had never played for the Senior side prior and was a surprise inclusion for the 2000 African Nations Cup co-hosted by Ghana and Nigeria. He had a fairytale introduction to International Football scoring on his debut barely 35 minutes upon coming on as a substitute for a misfiring Benedict Akwuegbu and producing the now iconic backflip goal celebration for the first time. Aghahowa played 32 matches and scored 14 goals for the Nigeria national team, including their only goal at the 2002 World Cup against Sweden. He became Nigeria's top goalscorer at the 2002 African Nations Cup. He also played at the 2000 Summer Olympics.

== Career statistics ==
=== Club ===
Appearances and goals by club, season and competition
Club	Season	League			National cup		League cup		Continental		Other		Total		Ref.
Club	Season	Division	Apps	Goals	Apps	Goals	Apps	Goals	Apps	Goals	Apps	Goals	Apps	Goals	Ref.
Shakhtar Donetsk	2000–01	Vyshcha Liha	8	7	2	1	–		0	0	–		10	8	
Shakhtar Donetsk	2001–02	Vyshcha Liha	17	7	2	1	–		6	2	–		25	10	
Shakhtar Donetsk	2002–03	Vyshcha Liha	10	1	4	1	–		3	1	–		17	3	
Shakhtar Donetsk	2003–04	Vyshcha Liha	17	6	6	2	–		4	2	–		27	10	
Shakhtar Donetsk	2004–05	Vyshcha Liha	15	8	5	3	–		13	5	–		33	16	
Shakhtar Donetsk	2005–06	Vyshcha Liha	13	0	2	1	–		5	0	–		20	1	
Shakhtar Donetsk	2006–07	Vyshcha Liha	9	3	1	0	–		7	0	1 (Note: One appearance in Ukrainian Super Cup)	0	18	3	
Shakhtar Donetsk	Total		89	32	22	9	0	0	38	10	1	0	150	51	–
Wigan Athletic	2006–07	Premier League	6	0	0	0	0	0	–		–		6	0	
Wigan Athletic	2007–08	Premier League	14	0	0	0	0	0	–		–		14	0	
Wigan Athletic	Total		20	0	0	0	0	0	0	0	0	0	20	0	–
Kayserispor	2008–09	Süper Lig	29	6	4	0	–		–		1	0	34	6	
Shakhtar Donetsk	2009–10	Ukrainian Premier League	9	1	3	0	–		5	0	1 (Note: One appearance in UEFA Super Cup)	0	18	1	
Shakhtar Donetsk	2010–11	Ukrainian Premier League	1	0	0	0	–		0	0	0	0	1	0	
Shakhtar Donetsk	2011–12	Ukrainian Premier League	0	0	0	0	–		0	0	0	0	0	0	
Shakhtar Donetsk	Total		10	1	3	0	0	0	5	0	1	0	19	1	–
Sevastopol (loan)	2010–11	Ukrainian Premier League	10	1	0	0	–		–		–		10	1	
Career total			158	40	29	9	0	0	43	10	3	0	233	59	–

=== International ===
Appearances and goals by national team and year
National team	Year	Apps	Goals
Nigeria	2000	4	3
Nigeria	2001	5	2
Nigeria	2002	12	7
Nigeria	2003	0	0
Nigeria	2004	5	1
Nigeria	2005	2	1
Nigeria	2006	3	0
Nigeria	2007	1	0
Total		32	14

Appearances and goals by national team and year
National team	Year	Apps	Goals
Nigeria Olympic	2000	4	1
Total		4	1

Scores and results list Nigeria's goal tally first, score column indicates score after each Aghahowa goal.

List of international goals scored by Julius Aghahowa
No.	Date	Venue	Opponent	Score	Result	Competition	Ref.
1	3 February 2000	National Stadium, Lagos, Nigeria	Morocco	2–0	2–0	2000 African Cup of Nations	
2	7 February 2000	National Stadium, Lagos, Nigeria	Senegal	1–1	2–1	2000 African Cup of Nations	
3	7 February 2000	National Stadium, Lagos, Nigeria	Senegal	2–1	2–1	2000 African Cup of Nations	
4	1 July 2001	Al-Merrikh Stadium, Omdurman, Sudan	Sudan	3–0	4–0	2002 FIFA World Cup qualification	
5	7 October 2001	St Mary's Stadium, Southampton, England	Japan	2–2	2–2	Friendly	
6	21 January 2002	Stade du 26 Mars, Bamako, Mali	Algeria	1–0	1–0	2002 African Cup of Nations	
7	28 January 2002	Stade Baréma Bocoum, Mopti, Mali	Liberia	1–0	1–0	2002 African Cup of Nations	
8	7 February 2002	Stade Amary Daou, Ségou, Mali	Senegal	1–1	1–2	2002 African Cup of Nations	
9	14 April 2002	Pittodrie Stadium, Aberdeen, Scotland	Scotland	1–1	2–1	Friendly	
10	14 April 2002	Pittodrie Stadium, Aberdeen, Scotland	Scotland	2–1	2–1	Friendly	
11	16 May 2002	Lansdowne Road, Dublin, Republic of Ireland	Republic of Ireland	1–0	2–1	Friendly	
12	7 June 2002	Kobe Wing Stadium, Kobe, Japan	Sweden	1–0	1–2	2002 FIFA World Cup	
13	5 September 2004	National Sports Stadium, Harare, Zimbabwe	Zimbabwe	1–0	3–0	2006 FIFA World Cup qualification	
14	26 March 2005	Liberation Stadium, Port Harcourt, Nigeria	Gabon	1–0	2–0	2006 FIFA World Cup qualification	

Scores and results list Nigeria Olympic's goal tally first, score column indicates score after each Aghahowa goal.

List of international goals scored by Julius Aghahowa
No.	Date	Venue	Opponent	Score	Result	Competition	Ref.
1	16 September 2000	Sydney Football Stadium, Sydney, Australia	Australia	2–0	3–2	2000 Summer Olympics	

== Honours ==
Espérance

- Tunisian Ligue Professionnelle 1: 2000

Shakhtar Donetsk

- Ukrainian Premier League: 2002, 2005, 2006, 2010
- Ukrainian Cup: 2002, 2004
