= 2005–06 Vyshcha Liha =

15th season of top-tier football league in Vyshcha Liha

Vyshcha Liha
- Season: 2005–06
- Champions: Shakhtar Donetsk; 3rd title
- Runner up: Dynamo Kyiv
- Relegated: Volyn Lutsk, Zakarpattia Uzhhorod
- Champions League: Shakhtar Donetsk (3rd Qualifying Round); Dynamo Kyiv (2nd Qualifying Round)
- UEFA Cup: Chornomorets Odesa (2nd Qualifying Round); Metalurh Zaporizhya (2nd Qualifying Round)
- Intertoto Cup: Dnipro Dnipropetrovsk (2nd Round)
- Matches: 241
- Goals: 554 (2.3 per match)
- Top goalscorer: (15) - Brandão; Emmanuel Okoduwa
- Biggest home win: (6:0) - Shakhtar-Illichivets (7:1) Dynamo-Volyn
- Biggest away win: (0:6) - Metalist-Dnipro
- Highest scoring: (3:6) - Metalurh Z.-Kharkiv
- Average attendance: 8,016

The 2005–06 Vyshcha Liha season was the fifteenth since its establishment.

== Summary ==
The season started on July 12, 2005 with six games of the first round. The last day of the competition was May 10, 2006. However, because the top two teams have finished with an equal number of points, it was decided to conduct a decisive game between them, which was named as the Golden Match. The game took place soon upon the conclusion of the regular season on May 14. The winner of the championship final became Shakhtar Donetsk that managed to defeat Dynamo Kyiv 2–1 and for the first time winning its second consecutive title and third over all. The top scorers competition was also tied between two foreigners Brandão from Brazil and Emmanuel Okoduwa from Nigeria. Both players won their individual award scoring 15 goals.

Both Shakhtar and Dynamo lost only once Shakhtar at home to Dynamo, while Dynamo lost its only game at home to Dnipro. Both Shakhtar and Dynamo also finished 30 points away from the closest trailing team in the standings. A good season had FC Illichivets Mariupol tying for the fourth together with FC Metalist Kharkiv and FC Dnipro Dnipropetrovsk. Also could be left unnoticed the big return of the Odesa sailors that finally earn their next set of medals for the first time since returning to premiers. Out of the newly promoted teams a good performance showed FC Stal Alchevsk that were just a point shy to stay among the top 10.

Both clubs from the Western Ukraine, FC Volyn Lutsk and FC Zakarpattia Uzhhorod, were forced into relegation due to their poor performance.

== Teams ==
=== Promoted ===
- FC Stal Alchevsk, champion of the 2004-05 Ukrainian First League – (returning after absence of 4 seasons)
- FC Arsenal Kharkiv, runner-up of the 2004-05 Ukrainian First League was replaced with the newly formed FC Kharkiv – (debut)

Notes: FC Arsenal Kharkiv was reinstated in the Ukrainian Second League.

=== Renamed ===
- FC Vorskla Poltava before the season carried the name of FC Vorskla-Naftogaz Poltava

=== Location map ===
Locations of team home grounds in Ukrainian Premier League 2005–06

== Managers ==
Club	Coach	Replaced coach
FC Arsenal Kyiv	(Ukraine) Oleksandr Zavarov	(Ukraine) Oleksandr Baranov (Ukraine) Ihor Babinchuk
FC Chornomorets Odesa	(Ukraine) Semen Altman	
FC Dnipro Dnipropetrovsk	(Ukraine) Oleh Protasov	(Ukraine) Yevhen Kucherevsky (Ukraine) Vadym Tyshchenko
FC Dynamo Kyiv	(Ukraine) Anatoliy Demyanenko	(Ukraine) Leonid Buryak
FC Volyn Lutsk	(Ukraine) Vitaliy Kvartsiany	
FC Kharkiv	(Ukraine) Hennadiy Lytovchenko	
FC Kryvbas Kryvyi Rih	(Ukraine) Oleksandr Kosevych	
FC Metalist Kharkiv	(Ukraine) Myron Markevych	
FC Metalurh Donetsk	(Ukraine) Stepan Matviiv	(Ukraine) Oleksandr Sevidov
FC Metalurh Zaporizhya	(Ukraine) Vyacheslav Hrozny	(Ukraine) Valeriy Yaremchenko (Ukraine) Anatoliy Chantsev
FC Illichivets Mariupol	(Ukraine) Ivan Balan	
FC Shakhtar Donetsk	(Romania) Mircea Lucescu	
SC Tavriya Simferopol	(Ukraine) Mykhailo Fomenko	(Ukraine) Oleh Fedorchuk
FC Vorskla Poltava	(Ukraine) Viktor Nosov	
FC Stal Alchevsk	(Ukraine) Anatoliy Volobuyev	
FC Zakarpattia Uzhhorod	(Ukraine) Petro Kushlyk	(Ukraine) Viktor Ryashko

== League table ==
Pos	Team	Pld	W	D	L	GF	GA	GD	Pts	Qualification or relegation
1	Shakhtar Donetsk (C)	30	23	6	1	64	14	+50	75	Qualification to Champions League third qualifying round
2	Dynamo Kyiv	30	23	6	1	68	20	+48	75	Qualification to Champions League second qualifying round
3	Chornomorets Odesa	30	13	6	11	36	31	+5	45	Qualification to UEFA Cup second qualifying round
4	Illychivets Mariupol	30	12	7	11	30	34	−4	43	
5	Metalist Kharkiv	30	12	7	11	35	42	−7	43	
6	Dnipro Dnipropetrovsk	30	11	10	9	33	23	+10	43	Qualification to Intertoto Cup second round
7	Tavriya Simferopol	30	11	6	13	29	31	−2	39	
8	Metalurh Zaporizhya	30	11	6	13	32	40	−8	39	Qualification to UEFA Cup second qualifying round
9	Metalurh Donetsk	30	10	9	11	35	35	0	39	
10	Vorskla Poltava	30	9	10	11	28	34	−6	37	
11	Stal Alchevsk	30	9	9	12	26	39	−13	36	
12	Arsenal Kyiv	30	9	8	13	31	39	−8	35	
13	FC Kharkiv	30	9	6	15	29	36	−7	33	
14	Kryvbas Kryvyi Rih	30	9	6	15	27	35	−8	33	
15	Volyn Lutsk (R)	30	9	6	15	31	45	−14	33	Relegated to Ukrainian First League
16	Zakarpattia Uzhhorod (R)	30	3	6	21	17	53	−36	15	Relegated to Ukrainian First League

Source: uafootball.net.ua
(C) Champions; (R) Relegated

== Results ==
Home \ Away	ARK	CHO	DNI	DYN	ILL	KHA	KRY	MET	MDO	MZA	SHA	STA	TAV	VOL	VOR	ZAK
Arsenal Kyiv	—	0–1	1–0	0–2	0–2	0–0	1–1	1–1	0–2	1–2	0–0	1–1	1–0	2–1	2–0	2–1
Chornomorets Odesa	1–1	—	0–0	0–1	1–2	1–0	2–1	5–2	1–0	0–0	0–1	2–2	1–2	2–0	1–2	2–0
Dnipro	1–0	1–2	—	0–3	0–1	2–0	1–0	0–0	1–0	3–0	2–2	0–1	1–3	0–0	0–0	4–0
Dynamo Kyiv	3–1	4–1	0–2	—	1–1	1–0	3–1	2–2	3–1	1–1	2–2	4–0	2–0	7–1	0–0	4–1
Illichivets Mariupol	3–5	0–1	0–0	1–2	—	2–1	1–0	0–2	1–0	1–0	1–2	3–0	0–1	1–1	3–2	2–0
FC Kharkiv	3–1	0–1	0–1	0–3	3–0	—	1–1	1–0	1–0	1–0	2–3	0–1	0–0	3–2	2–0	1–0
Kryvbas Kryvyi Rih	1–2	1–0	2–2	0–1	0–1	3–1	—	2–1	0–1	1–0	0–2	2–1	2–0	2–1	2–2	1–0
Metalist Kharkiv	1–2	1–1	0–6	1–2	1–1	1–0	1–0	—	2–0	3–1	1–5	1–0	2–0	1–0	0–1	4–1
Metalurh Donetsk	2–2	3–2	1–1	0–3	0–0	1–1	3–2	3–1	—	0–0	1–3	5–0	0–0	4–0	2–0	1–0
Metalurh Zaporizhzhya	2–2	1–0	1–0	1–2	2–1	3–6	2–1	0–0	3–1	—	0–3	2–1	2–1	0–1	0–2	3–0
Shakhtar Donetsk	1–0	2–0	2–0	0–1	6–0	3–0	1–0	2–0	2–0	3–1	—	1–1	1–1	2–0	0–0	3–0
Stal Alchevsk	1–0	0–1	0–0	1–2	1–0	0–0	0–1	1–1	1–1	1–1	1–3	—	1–0	2–2	2–0	1–0
Tavriya Simferopol	0–1	1–1	0–1	0–0	0–1	2–1	1–0	0–1	3–0	1–0	0–3	5–2	—	1–2	2–3	1–0
Volyn Lutsk	2–1	0–3	2–1	1–3	0–0	2–0	3–0	3–0	1–2	0–1	0–1	0–1	0–0	—	2–1	3–1
Vorskla Poltava	2–0	1–2	1–1	0–4	1–0	0–0	0–0	0–1	1–1	3–1	0–2	1–0	2–3	2–0	—	0–0
Zakarpattia Uzhhorod	2–1	2–1	1–2	1–2	1–1	2–1	0–0	2–3	0–0	0–2	0–3	0–2	0–1	1–1	1–1	—

Source: uafootball.net.ua
Legend: Blue = home team win; Yellow = draw; Red = away team win.

== Final match ==
14 May 2006
18:00 LST

Shakhtar Donetsk	2 – 1 (a.e.t.)	Dynamo Kyiv
Marica 59'; Aghahowa 100'	Report	Rodolfo 79'

Metalurh Stadium, Kryvyi Rih
Attendance: 29,734
Referee: Ľuboš Micheľ (Slovakia), (FIFA)

Shakhtar Donetsk	Dynamo Kyiv

Shakhtar Donetsk:
GK	35	(Ukraine) Bohdan Shust
DF	33	(Croatia) Darijo Srna
DF	27	(Ukraine) Dmytro Chyhrynskyi
DF	3	(Czech Republic) Tomáš Hübschman	(yellow card) 58'	(substituted off) 91'
DF	26	(Romania) Răzvan Raț
MF	36	(Brazil) Elano	(yellow card) 21'	(substituted off) 73'
MF	4	(Ukraine) Anatoliy Tymoshchuk (c)
MF	18	(Poland) Mariusz Lewandowski
MF	7	(Brazil) Fernandinho
FW	29	(Romania) Ciprian Marica	59'	(substituted off) 80'
FW	25	(Brazil) Brandão	(yellow card) 118'
Substitutes:
MF	6	(Serbia and Montenegro) Igor Duljaj	(substituted in) 73'	(yellow card) 120'
DF	8	(Brazil) Leonardo
DF	13	(Ukraine) Vyacheslav Shevchuk
DF	14	(Romania) Flavius Stoican	(substituted in) 91'
GK	16	(Czech Republic) Jan Laštůvka
FW	17	(Nigeria) Julius Aghahowa	(substituted in) 80'	100'
FW	20	(Ukraine) Oleksiy Byelik
Manager:
(Romania) Mircea Lucescu

Dynamo Kyiv:
GK	1	(Ukraine) Oleksandr Shovkovskyi (c)
DF	3	(Ukraine) Serhiy Fedorov
FW	5	(Ukraine) Serhii Rebrov	(yellow card) 101'
FW	9	(Brazil) Kléber	(yellow card) 45'
MF	14	(Ukraine) Ruslan Rotan		(substituted off) 12'
FW	16	(Uzbekistan) Maksim Shatskikh
MF	20	(Ukraine) Oleh Husyev
DF	27	(Ukraine) Vladyslav Vashchuk
MF	30	(Morocco) Badr El Kaddouri	(yellow card) 119'
DF	32	(Serbia and Montenegro) Goran Gavrančić		(substituted off) 55'
DF	33	(Russia) Andrey Yeshchenko		(substituted off) 68'
Substitutes:
DF	4	(Brazil) Rodolfo	(substituted in) 55'	79'
MF	8	(Belarus) Valyantsin Byalkevich	(substituted in) 12'
MF	15	(Brazil) Diogo Rincón
FW	23	(Latvia) Māris Verpakovskis
FW	25	(Ukraine) Artem Milevskyi	(substituted in) 68'	(yellow card) 82'
DF	26	(Ukraine) Andriy Nesmachniy
GK	55	(Ukraine) Oleksandr Rybka
Manager:
(Ukraine) Anatoliy Demyanenko

MATCH OFFICIALS

- Assistant referees:
  - (Slovakia) Martin Balko
  - (Slovakia) Tomáš Mokoš
- Fourth official: (Slovakia) V. Grinjak

MATCH RULES

- 90 minutes.
- 30 minutes of extra-time if necessary.
- Penalty shoot-out if scores still level.
- Seven named substitutes
- Maximum of 3 substitutions.

== Top goal scorers ==
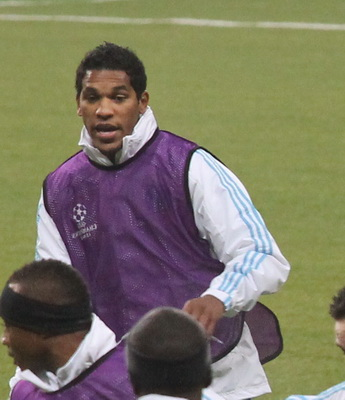
Brandão

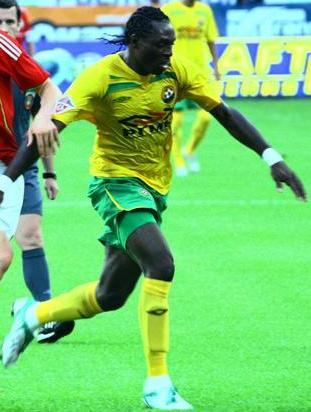
Okoduwa

(Brazil) Brandão	Shakhtar Donetsk	15
(Nigeria) Emmanuel Okoduwa	Arsenal Kyiv	15
(Ukraine) Oleksandr Kosyrin	Metalurh Donetsk	13 (2)
(Ukraine) Serhii Rebrov	Dynamo Kyiv	13 (2)
(Ukraine) Vasyl Sachko	Volyn Lutsk	13 (2)
(Brazil) Kléber	Dynamo Kyiv	11
(Brazil) Matuzalém	Shakhtar Donetsk	10 (1)
(Armenia) Ara Hakobyan	Metalurh Donetsk	10 (3)
(Brazil) Diogo Rincón	Dynamo Kyiv	10 (4)
(Ukraine) Serhiy Shyshchenko	Metalurh Zaporizhya	9
(Georgia (country)) Vasil Gigiadze	Kryvbas Kryvyi Rih	9 (4)

== See also ==
- 2005–06 Ukrainian Cup
