= Murat Sözgelmez =

Turkish footballer

Personal information
- Date of birth: August 21, 1985 (age 41)
- Place of birth: İzmir, Turkey
- Height: 1.83 m (6 ft 0 in)
- Position: Center back

Youth career
- 1999–2002: İzmir G.S.K.
- 2002–2004: Altay

Senior career*
Years	Team	Apps	(Gls)
2004–2006	Altay	11	(1)
2006–2011	Sivasspor	103	(5)
2011	Karşıyaka	12	(0)
2011–2013	Çaykur Rizespor	45	(2)
2013–2014	Balıkesirspor	26	(1)
2014–2015	Antalyaspor	2	(0)
2015	Elazığspor	13	(0)
2015–2016	Ankaragücü	4	(0)
2016–2017	Ergene Velimeşe		
2017–2018	Somaspor		

International career
2008	Turkey B	1	(0)
- * Club domestic league appearances and goals

Murat Sözgelmez (born 21 August 1985) is a Turkish retired professional footballer who played as a center back.

== Career ==
Sözgelmez began his career with local club İzmir G.S.K. in 1999. He spent two years with the club before moving to another local club, Altay, in 2002. Sözgelmez began playing for the first team in 2004, and was transferred to Sivasspor in 2006. He has been a constant fixture in the side, making 103 appearances and scoring five goals in four seasons.

== International career ==
Sözgelmez has been capped by the Turkey B national football team once, in a friendly against Romania in 2008.
