= Kostyantyn Kravchenko =

Ukrainian footballer

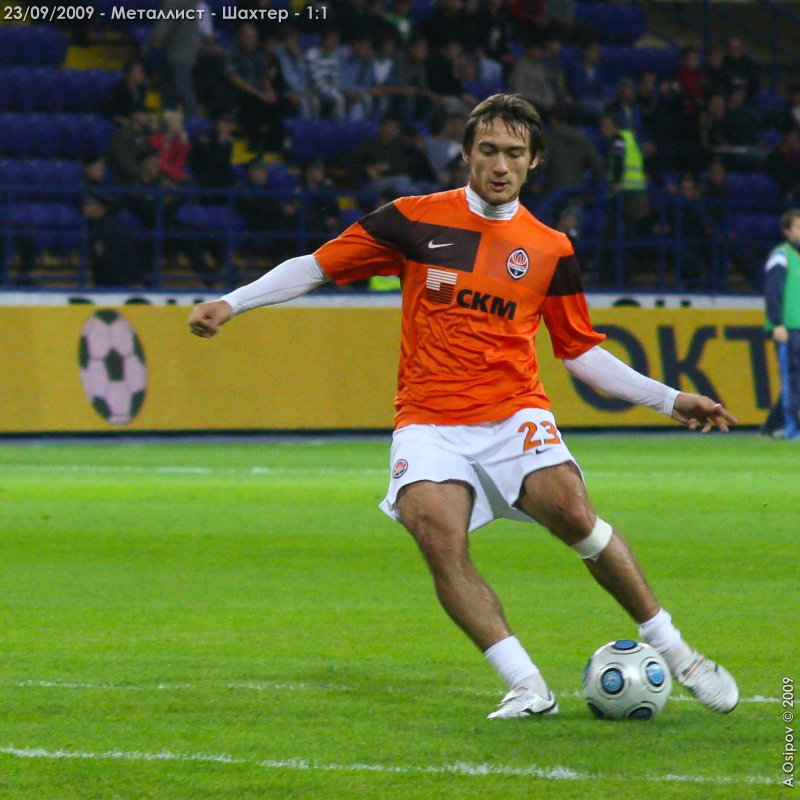

Personal information
- Full name: Kostyantyn Serhiyovych Kravchenko
- Date of birth: 24 September 1986 (age 40)
- Place of birth: Dnipropetrovsk, Soviet Union
- Height: 1.82 m (6 ft 0 in)
- Position: Attacking midfielder

Team information
- Current team: Stal Kamianske (U19 team assistant)

Youth career
- 2000–2001: FC Dnipromain-2 Dnipropetrovsk
- 2001–2002: FC Dnipro Dnipropetrovsk

Senior career*
Years	Team	Apps	(Gls)
2002–2008	Dnipro Dnipropetrovsk	75	(5)
2002	→ Dnipro-3 Dnipropetrovsk	2	(0)
2002–2004	→ Dnipro-2 Dnipropetrovsk	31	(5)
2008–2012	Shakhtar Donetsk	28	(9)
2010–2011	→ Illichivets Mariupol (loan)	5	(1)
2011	→ Karpaty Lviv (loan)	3	(0)
2012–2014	Illichivets Mariupol	13	(4)
2014	Spartaks Jūrmala	8	(3)
2015	Desna Chernihiv	8	(0)
2016	Stal Kamianske	0	(0)

International career^{‡}
2002	Ukraine U16	5	(3)
2002–2003	Ukraine U17	12	(6)
2003–2004	Ukraine U18	6	(1)
2004–2005	Ukraine U19	9	(1)
2004–2008	Ukraine U21	17	(5)

Managerial career
- 2016–: Stal Kamianske (U19 team assistant)
Medal record
Men's football
Representing Ukraine
UEFA European Under-19 Championship
Bronze medal – third place	2004 Switzerland
- * Club domestic league appearances and goals as of 23 July 2016 ‡ National team caps and goals as of 22 February 2015

Kostyantyn Kravchenko (Ukrainian: Костянтин Сергійович Кравченко; born 24 September 1986) is a retired Ukrainian footballer.

Usually an offensive midfielder, Kravchenko is best known for his passing, technique and finishing ability. His brother Anton Kravchenko is also a football player.

== Career ==
Kravchenko previously appeared for FC Dnipro Dnipropetrovsk from 2004 before signing for Shakhtar on 10 January 2008 for a fee of $5.5 million. He scored his first goal for Shakhtar Donetsk on 30 March 2008 in a 4–2 win over Arsenal Kyiv. Following his move to Shakhtar they won the Ukrainian Premier League but fell one appearance short of obtaining a winner's medal.

Since July 2011 he has been on one-year loan in Karpaty Lviv.

In July 2012, Kravchenko signed a three-year contract with Illichivets Mariupol.

In July 2014 Kravchenko joined the Latvian Higher League club FK Spartaks Jūrmala, signing a contract till the end of the season.

== Honours ==
- 2008 Ukrainian Premier League, with Shakhtar Donetsk
