= Artem Tetenko =

Ukrainian footballer

Personal information
- Full name: Artem Oleksandrovych Tetenko
- Date of birth: 12 February 1991 (age 35)
- Place of birth: Stakhanov (now Kadiivka), Ukrainian SSR, Soviet Union
- Height: 1.93 m (6 ft 4 in)
- Position: Goalkeeper

Youth career
- 2003: FC Stal Alchevsk
- 2004–2007: FC Shakhtar Donetsk

Senior career*
Years	Team	Apps	(Gls)
2007–2008	Shakhtar-3 Donetsk	4	(0)
2007–2012	Shakhtar Donetsk	0	(0)

International career^{‡}
2006–2007	Ukraine-16	7	(0)
2006–2007	Ukraine-17	6	(0)
2008	Ukraine-18	1	(0)
2009–2010	Ukraine-19	2	(0)
- * Club domestic league appearances and goals as of 6 October 2010 ‡ National team caps and goals as of 6 October 2010

Artem Tetenko (Ukrainian: Артем Олександрович Тетенко, born 12 February 1991) is a Ukrainian football goalkeeper who played for FC Shakhtar Donetsk in the Ukrainian Premier League.
