= Oleksiy Polyanskyi =

Ukrainian footballer (born 1986)

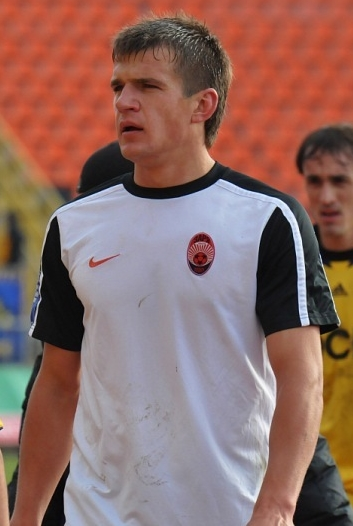

Personal information
- Full name: Oleksiy Volodymyrovych Polyanskyi
- Date of birth: 12 April 1986 (age 40)
- Place of birth: Avdiivka, Ukrainian SSR
- Height: 1.82 m (6 ft 0 in)
- Position: Centre back

Senior career*
Years	Team	Apps	(Gls)
2003–2006	Metalurh Donetsk	34	(4)
2003–2004	→ Metalurh-2 Donetsk	27	(2)
2006–2016	Shakhtar Donetsk	14	(0)
2008	→ Illichivets Mariupol (loan)	8	(0)
2010–2011	→ Zorya Luhansk (loan)	41	(2)
2011–2012	→ Illichivets Mariupol (loan)	29	(0)
2013–2014	→ Illichivets Mariupol (loan)	31	(3)
2014–2015	→ Hoverla Uzhhorod (loan)	14	(2)
2015–2016	→ Metalist Kharkiv (loan)	16	(1)
2016–2017	Persepolis	4	(0)

International career
2005	Ukraine-19	5	(0)
2006–2007	Ukraine-21	10	(1)
- * Club domestic league appearances and goals

Oleksiy Volodymyrovych Polyanskyi (Ukrainian: Олексій Володимирович Полянський; born 12 April 1986) is a Ukrainian retired footballer.

== Club career ==
=== Persepolis ===
Polyanskyi signed with Persian Gulf Pro League club Persepolis in the summer of 2016. He made his first start in January 2017 in a 2–0 victory against Saba Qom.
