= Vasil Gigiadze =

Georgian footballer

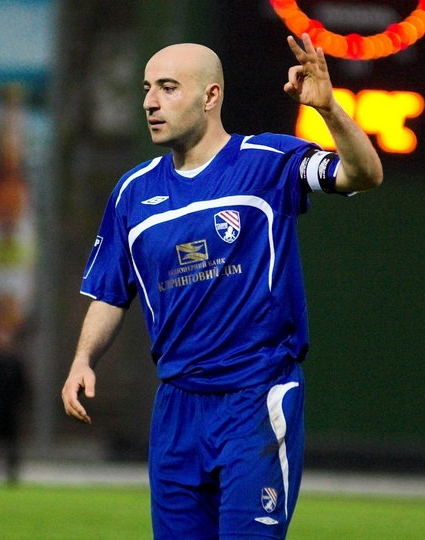

Personal information
- Date of birth: 3 June 1977 (age 49)
- Place of birth: Kutaisi, Soviet Union
- Height: 1.76 m (5 ft 9 1/2 in)
- Position: Forward

Youth career
- sport school #4 (Kutaisi)

Senior career*
Years	Team	Apps	(Gls)
1993–1994	FC Torpedo-2 Kutaisi	23	(6)
1994–1996	FC Rzmena Kutaisi	49	(7)
1996–1997	Torpedo Kutaisi	22	(2)
1997–2000	Iberia Samtredia	41	(20)
2000	Dinamo Tbilisi	8	(1)
2000–2003	Tavriya Simferopol	70	(24)
2003–2004	Uralan Elista	30	(4)
2004–2005	Tavriya Simferopol	26	(9)
2005–2007	Kryvbas Kryvyi Rih	56	(20)
2007–2008	Naftovyk-Ukrnafta Okhtyrka	13	(0)
2008–2011	Tavriya Simferopol	80	(8)
Total		418	(101)

International career
2005–2007	Georgia	6	(0)
- * Club domestic league appearances and goals

Vasil Gigiadze (Georgian: ვასილ გიგიაძე; born 3 June 1977) is a Georgian former footballer.
