= 2004–05 Vyshcha Liha =

14th season of top-tier football league in Vyshcha Liha

Vyshcha Liha
- Season: 2004–05
- Champions: Shakhtar Donetsk; 2nd title
- Relegated: Obolon Kyiv, Borysfen Boryspil
- Champions League: Shakhtar Donetsk (3rd Qualifying Round); Dynamo Kyiv (2nd Qualifying Round)
- UEFA Cup: Metalurh Donetsk (2nd Qualifying Round); Dnipro Dnipropetrovsk (2nd Qualifying Round)
- Matches played: 240
- Goals scored: 506 (2.11 per match)
- Top goalscorer: (14) - Oleksandr Kosyrin (Chornomorets Odesa)
- Biggest home win: (4:0) - Tavriya-Vorskla
- Biggest away win: (0:7) - Obolon-Dynamo
- Highest scoring: (0:7) - Obolon-Dynamo (5:2) Shakhtar-Obolon; Arsenal-Illichivets
- Average attendance: 7,391

The 2004–05 Vyshcha Liha season was the fourteenth since its establishment.

The season started on July 15, 2004, with all eight games of the first round. The last day of the competition was June 16, 2005. Shakhtar Donetsk won its second champion's title place ahead of the reigning champions Dynamo that held for the last couple of seasons. The Miners only lost two of their games, one at home to Metalist Kharkiv that had just returned to the top league and another one in Simferopol to Tavriya. Shakhtar also won both of their match-ups with Dynamo Kyiv. The top scorers competition was won by Oleksandr Kosyrin from Chornomorets Odesa who had 14 precise shots on goal.

Illichivets Mariupol was close to qualify for the European competition once again; however, it was not able to convert on the poor playing form of the leading Dnipro Dnipropetrovsk that had a bad stretch at the "finish line".

Both clubs from the Kyiv region, FC Obolon Kyiv and FC Borysfen Boryspil, that performed very well last season were forced into relegation due to their poor performance. Especially, strikingly bad season had Borysfen that won three games.

== Teams ==
=== Promotions ===
- Zakarpattia Uzhhorod, the winners of the 2003–04 Ukrainian First League – (returning after absence of 2 seasons)
- Metalist Kharkiv, the runners-up of the 2003–04 Ukrainian First League – (returning after absence of a seasons)

=== Location ===
Locations of teams home grounds in Ukrainian Premier League 2004-05

== Managers ==
Club	Coach	Replaced coach
FC Arsenal Kyiv	(Ukraine) Oleksandr Baranov	
FC Chornomorets Odesa	(Ukraine) Semen Altman	
FC Dnipro Dnipropetrovsk	(Ukraine) Yevhen Kucherevsky	
FC Dynamo Kyiv	(Ukraine) Yozhef Sabo	(Ukraine) Oleksiy Mykhailychenko
FC Volyn Lutsk	(Ukraine) Petro Kushlyk	(Ukraine) Vitaliy Kvartsiany
FC Borysfen Boryspil	(Ukraine) Stepan Matviiv	(Ukraine) Oleksandr Ryabokon
FC Kryvbas Kryvyi Rih	(Ukraine) Oleksandr Kosevych	(Ukraine) Anatoliy Piskovets
FC Metalist Kharkiv	(Ukraine) Oleksandr Zavarov	(Ukraine) Hennadiy Lytovchenko
FC Metalurh Donetsk	(Russia) Vitaliy Shevchenko	(Serbia) Slavoljub Muslin
FC Metalurh Zaporizhya	(Ukraine) Valeriy Yaremchenko	
FC Illichivets Mariupol	(Ukraine) Ivan Balan	(Ukraine) Mykola Pavlov
FC Shakhtar Donetsk	(Romania) Mircea Lucescu	
SC Tavriya Simferopol	(Ukraine) Oleh Fedorchuk	(Ukraine) Anatoliy Zayaev
FC Vorskla Poltava	(Ukraine) Volodymyr Muntyan	
FC Obolon Kyiv	(Ukraine) Oleksandr Ryabokon	(Ukraine) Petro Slobodyan
FC Zakarpattia Uzhhorod	(Ukraine) Viktor Ryashko	

== League table ==
Pos	Team	Pld	W	D	L	GF	GA	GD	Pts	Qualification or relegation
1	Shakhtar Donetsk (C)	30	26	2	2	63	19	+44	80	Qualification to Champions League third qualifying round
2	Dynamo Kyiv	30	23	4	3	58	14	+44	73	Qualification to Champions League second qualifying round
3	Metalurh Donetsk	30	14	7	9	38	35	+3	49	Qualification to UEFA Cup second qualifying round
4	Dnipro Dnipropetrovsk	30	13	9	8	38	34	+4	48	Qualification to UEFA Cup second qualifying round
5	Illichivets Mariupol	30	12	8	10	38	34	+4	44	
6	Chornomorets Odesa	30	12	6	12	29	29	0	42	
7	Tavriya Simferopol	30	11	9	10	34	28	+6	42	
8	Volyn Lutsk	30	11	7	12	35	37	−2	40	
9	Arsenal Kyiv	30	9	10	11	30	33	−3	37	
10	Metalurh Zaporizhzhia	30	8	11	11	25	32	−7	35	
11	Metalist Kharkiv	30	9	7	14	25	37	−12	34	
12	Zakarpattia Uzhhorod	30	7	10	13	21	30	−9	31	
13	Kryvbas Kryvyi Rih	30	7	10	13	24	38	−14	31	
14	Vorskla-Naftohaz Poltava	30	8	6	16	18	35	−17	30	
15	Obolon Kyiv (R)	30	4	9	17	18	43	−25	21	Relegated to Ukrainian First League
16	Borysfen Boryspil (R)	30	3	11	16	15	31	−16	20	Relegated to Ukrainian First League

Source: uafootball.net.ua
(C) Champions; (R) Relegated

== Results ==
Home \ Away	ARK	BOR	CHO	DNI	DYN	ILL	KRY	MET	MDO	MZA	OBO	SHA	TAV	VOL	VOR	ZAK
Arsenal Kyiv	—	2–1	2–1	1–2	0–0	5–2	0–2	0–0	2–1	1–0	1–0	1–1	2–2	1–2	2–0	2–2
Borysfen Boryspil	0–1	—	0–1	1–1	0–0	1–1	0–0	0–1	0–1	1–1	0–0	0–2	0–1	1–0	-:+	1–3
Chornomorets Odesa	1–0	0–1	—	2–0	0–3	0–1	3–1	2–1	1–0	1–0	3–1	1–3	1–0	2–1	1–1	0–0
Dnipro	1–0	0–0	1–0	—	1–2	2–0	2–1	4–2	3–3	1–1	3–0	1–3	3–1	1–0	3–1	0–3
Dynamo Kyiv	1–1	2–0	3–1	2–0	—	2–0	2–0	3–0	1–0	1–2	3–1	0–2	1–0	3–0	1–0	3–0
Illichivets Mariupol	0–0	1–0	2–1	3–0	1–1	—	2–0	1–1	3–0	2–2	1–1	0–1	2–2	1–0	2–0	3–0
Kryvbas Kryvyi Rih	0–3	1–1	0–0	1–2	0–2	0–0	—	3–1	1–1	0–0	1–1	1–2	0–2	0–0	1–0	1–0
Metalist Kharkiv	1–1	3–1	0–1	0–2	0–2	1–0	0–1	—	1–4	0–0	0–1	0–1	1–1	1–0	1–0	1–0
Metalurh Donetsk	1–0	1–3	1–0	2–1	1–2	2–1	1–1	3–1	—	1–0	2–1	1–3	2–1	1–0	2–0	2–0
Metalurh Zaporizhzhia	0–0	2–1	0–2	1–1	0–2	0–2	2–0	1–4	2–0	—	1–0	1–3	1–2	1–1	1–0	1–0
Obolon Kyiv	2–1	0–0	1–1	0–1	0–7	1–2	0–1	0–0	1–1	0–0	—	0–1	0–1	1–2	0–1	0–0
Shakhtar Donetsk	3–0	2–0	1–0	2–0	3–2	4–1	4–2	0–1	3–0	2–1	5–2	—	1–0	3–1	1–0	1–0
Tavriya Simferopol	1–1	2–1	2–2	1–1	0–1	2–0	1–2	1–0	0–0	1–1	0–1	2–1	—	4–1	4–0	+:-
Volyn Lutsk	1–0	0–0	1–0	1–1	0–1	3–2	3–1	4–2	1–2	2–2	1–0	1–3	1–0	—	1–1	3–0
Vorskla-Naftohaz Poltava	3–0	1–1	0–0	0–0	0–3	1–2	2–1	0–1	1–1	1–0	2–1	0–2	1–0	0–2	—	2–0
Zakarpattia Uzhhorod	2–0	1–0	2–1	0–0	1–2	1–0	1–1	0–0	1–1	0–1	1–2	0–0	0–0	2–2	1–0	—

Source: uafootball.net.ua
Legend: Blue = home team win; Yellow = draw; Red = away team win.

== Top goal scorers ==
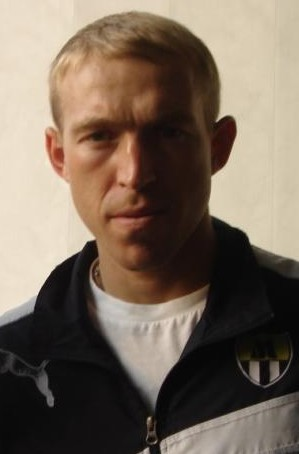
Kosyrin

(Ukraine) Oleksandr Kosyrin	Chornomorets Odesa	14 (4)
(Ukraine) Vasyl Sachko	Volyn Lutsk	12
(Peru) Andrés Augusto Mendoza	Metalurh Donetsk	12 (1)
(Brazil) Brandao	Shakhtar Donetsk	12 (2)
(Ukraine) Serhiy Zakarlyuka	Illychivets Mariupol	12 (4)
(Uzbekistan) Maksim Shatskikh	Dynamo Kyiv	11
(Brazil) Diogo Rincón	Dynamo Kyiv	10 (6)
(Georgia (country)) Vasyl Gigiadze	Tavriya Simferopol	9 (1)
(Nigeria) Julius Aghahowa	Shakhtar Donetsk	8
(Brazil) Kléber	Dynamo Kyiv	8
(Brazil) Matuzalem	Shakhtar Donetsk	8
