= 2007–08 FC Shakhtar Donetsk season =

Shakhtar Donetsk
2007–08 season
- Chairman: Rinat Akhmetov
- Manager: Mircea Lucescu
- Ground: RSC Olimpiyskiy
- Vyshcha Liha: Winners
- Ukrainian Cup: Winners
- Super Cup: Runners-up
- Champions League: Group stage
- Top goalscorer: League: Oleksandr Hladkyi (17); All: Oleksandr Hladkyi (21)
- Highest home attendance: 26,000 vs Red Bull Salzburg (29 August 2007); 26,000 vs Metalurh Donetsk (17 May 2008)
- Lowest home attendance: 3,000 vs Vorskla Poltava (12 December 2007)
- Average home league attendance: 20,147 (17 May 2008)
Home colours	Away colours

The 2007–08 season was FC Shakhtar Donetsk's 17th consecutive season in the top flight of Ukrainian football.

== Season summary ==
On 1 July, Shakhtar rejected a $7,000,000 offer from Palermo for Matuzalém.

On 13 July, Shakhtar announced the signing of Cristiano Lucarelli from Livorno, to a three-year contract, for a fee of €8,000,000.

On 28 July, Shakhtar announced the signing of Ilsinho from São Paulo, to a four-year contract, with conditional fifth year, for a fee of €10,000,000.

On 31 July, Shakhtar announced the signing of Nery Castillo from Olympiacos, to a five-year contract, for a fee of €20,000,000.

On 2 August, Elano left Shakhtar to sign for Manchester City for a fee of £8,000,000.

On 23 August, Shakhtar announced the signing of Willian from Corinthians, to a five-year contract, for a fee of $19,000,000.

On 18 December 2007, Manchester City announced the year-long loan signing of Nery Castillo from Shakhtar, commencing on 1 January.

On 15 January, Cristiano Lucarelli left Shakhtar to sign for Parma for a fee of €5,700,000.

On 27 January, Oleksiy Byelik left Shakhtar to join VfL Bochum on loan for the remainder of the season.

On 25 March, Leonardo joined São Caetano on loan until 30 November 2008.

=== Matuzalém saga ===
On 2 July, Matuzalém notified Shakhtar in writing that he was terminating their contract with immediate effect. On 5 July, Shakhtar responded stating that Matuzalém and/or his new club should pay the release clause in his contract of €25 million, or that they would take legal action.

On 18 July, Real Zaragoza presented Matuzalém as their newest signing.

On 2 November, Shakhtar's case with Matuzalém was considered by FIFA Dispute Resolution Chamber (DRC), ruling that Matuzalém and Zaragoza were jointly and severally liable, ordering a payment of €6,800,000 to Shakhtar.

On 19 March, Shakhtar appealed to the Court of Arbitration for Sport (CAS) that the fee for Matuzalém set by FIFA DRC was too low, with Matuzalém and Zaragoza making a counter appeal to CAS for the compensation the following day.

On 19 May, the CAS ordered Matuzalém to pay €11,858,934 to Shakhtar for breach of contract. The decision was upheld by the Swiss Federal Tribunal.

Zaragoza would also later pay Shakhtar €500,000, on 1 September 2010, as part of the Matuzalém sage.

== Squad ==
As of match played 17 May 2008

Number	Name	Nationality	Position	Date of birth (Age)	Signed from	Signed in	Contract ends	Apps.	Goals
Goalkeepers
1	Bohdan Shust	(Ukraine)	GK	4 March 1986 (aged 22)	Karpaty Lviv	2005			
12	Dmytro Shutkov	(Ukraine)	GK	3 April 1972 (aged 36)	Youth Team	1991		347	0
30	Andriy Pyatov	(Ukraine)	GK	28 June 1984 (aged 23)	Vorskla Poltava	2007		38	0
35	Yuriy Virt	(Ukraine)	GK	4 May 1974 (aged 34)	Metalurh Donetsk	2007			
Defenders
3	Tomáš Hübschman	(Czech Republic)	DF	4 September 1981 (aged 26)	Sparta Prague	2004	2009	121	5
4	Igor Duljaj	(Serbia)	DF	29 October 1979 (aged 28)	Partizan	2004	2008	151	5
5	Oleksandr Kucher	(Ukraine)	DF	22 October 1982 (aged 25)	Metalist Kharkiv	2006		56	2
13	Vyacheslav Shevchuk	(Ukraine)	DF	13 May 1979 (aged 29)	Dnipro Dnipropetrovsk	2005		86	0
18	Mariusz Lewandowski	(Poland)	DF	18 May 1979 (aged 28)	Dyskobolia Grodzisk	2001		227	27
26	Răzvan Raț	(Romania)	DF	26 May 1981 (aged 26)	Rapid București	2003		167	6
27	Dmytro Chyhrynskyi	(Ukraine)	DF	7 November 1986 (aged 21)	Academy	2002		87	8
28	Oleksiy Polyanskyi	(Ukraine)	DF	12 April 1986 (aged 22)	Metalurh Donetsk	2006		10	0
33	Darijo Srna (Captain)	(Croatia)	DF	1 May 1982 (aged 26)	Hajduk Split	2003		179	11
55	Volodymyr Yezerskiy	(Ukraine)	DF	15 November 1976 (aged 31)	Dnipro Dnipropetrovsk	2007		24	1
Midfielders
7	Fernandinho	(Brazil)	MF	4 May 1985 (aged 23)	Paranaense	2005	2010	115	19
8	Jádson	(Brazil)	MF	5 October 1983 (aged 24)	Paranaense	2005	2009	130	28
10	Zvonimir Vukić	(Serbia)	MF	19 July 1979 (aged 28)	Partizan	2003	2008	106	20
11	Ilsinho	(Brazil)	MF	12 October 1985 (aged 22)	São Paulo	2007	2011	33	5
19	Oleksiy Hai	(Ukraine)	MF	6 November 1982 (aged 25)	Illichivets Mariupol	2000		120	13
22	Willian	(Brazil)	MF	9 August 1988 (aged 19)	Corinthians	2007	2012	28	1
23	Kostyantyn Kravchenko	(Ukraine)	MF	24 September 1986 (aged 21)	Dnipro Dnipropetrovsk	2008		11	3
Forwards
15	Volodymyr Pryyomov	(Ukraine)	FW	2 January 1986 (aged 22)	Metalurh Donetsk	2007		8	0
17	Luiz Adriano	(Brazil)	FW	12 April 1987 (aged 21)	Internacional	2007		25	5
21	Oleksandr Hladkyi	(Ukraine)	FW	24 August 1987 (aged 20)	Kharkiv	2007		46	21
25	Brandão	(Brazil)	FW	16 June 1980 (aged 27)	Iraty	2002		199	85
Away on loan
9	Nery Castillo	(Mexico)	FW	13 June 1984 (aged 23)	Olympiacos	2007	2012	14	1
14	Yevhen Bredun	(Ukraine)	MF	10 September 1982 (aged 25)	Youth team	2000			
20	Oleksiy Byelik	(Ukraine)	FW	15 February 1981 (aged 27)	Youth team	1998		209	65
24	Ruslan Fomin	(Ukraine)	FW	2 March 1986 (aged 22)	Arsenal Kharkiv	2005		13	3
34	Oleh Karamushka	(Ukraine)	DF	30 April 1984 (aged 24)	Borysfen Boryspil	2005			
37	Serhiy Tkachenko	(Ukraine)	MF	10 February 1979 (aged 29)	Metalurh Donetsk	2006			
	Jan Laštůvka	(Czech Republic)	GK	7 July 1982 (aged 25)	Baník Ostrava	2004		63	0
	Leonardo	(Brazil)	DF	9 March 1986 (aged 22)	Santos	2005	2010	23	0
Players who left during the season
9	Matuzalém	(Brazil)	FW	10 June 1980 (aged 27)	Brescia	2004			
22	Maksym Trusevych	(Ukraine)	MF	1 August 1985 (aged 22)	Borysfen Boryspil	2005			
29	Ciprian Marica	(Romania)	FW	2 October 1985 (aged 22)	Dinamo București	2004	2008	119	24
36	Elano	(Brazil)	MF	14 June 1981 (aged 26)	Santos	2005	2010	77	22
99	Cristiano Lucarelli	(Italy)	FW	4 October 1975 (aged 32)	Livorno	2007	2010	21	8

== Transfers ==
=== In ===
Date From	Position	Nationality	Name	From	Fee	Ref.
13 July 2007	FW	(Italy)	Cristiano Lucarelli	Livorno	€8,000,000	
28 July 2007	MF	(Brazil)	Ilsinho	São Paulo	€10,000,000	
31 July 2007	FW	(Mexico)	Nery Castillo	Olympiacos	€20,000,000	
23 August 2007	MF	(Brazil)	Willian	Corinthians	$19,000,000	

=== Out ===
Date From	Position	Nationality	Name	To	Fee	Ref.
23 July 2007	FW	(Romania)	Ciprian Marica	VfB Stuttgart	Undisclosed	
2 August 2007	MF	(Brazil)	Elano	Manchester City	£8,000,000	
15 January 2008	FW	(Italy)	Cristiano Lucarelli	Parma	€5,700,000	

=== Loans out ===
Date From	Position	Nationality	Name	To	Date To	Ref.
19 February 2007	DF	(Brazil)	Leonardo	Santos	31 December 2007	
1 January 2008	FW	(Mexico)	Nery Castillo	Manchester City	31 December 2008	
27 January 2008	FW	(Ukraine)	Oleksiy Byelik	VfL Bochum	30 June 2008	
25 March 2008	DF	(Brazil)	Leonardo	São Caetano	30 November 2008	

=== Released ===
Date	Position	Nationality	Name	Joined	Date	Ref.
2 July 2007	MF	(Brazil)	Matuzalém	Real Zaragoza	18 July 2007	

== Competitions ==
=== Overall ===
Competition	First match	Last match	Starting round	Final position	Record							
Competition	First match	Last match	Starting round	Final position	Pld	W	D	L	GF	GA	GD	Win %
Vyshcha Liha	15 July 2007	17 May 2008	Matchday 1	Winners	30	24	2	4	75	24	+51	80.00
Ukrainian Cup	26 September 2007	7 May 2008	Round of 32	Winners	7	6	1	0	16	3	+13	85.71
Super Cup	10 July 2007		Final	Runnersup	1	0	1	0	2	2	+0	0.00
UEFA Champions League	31 July 2007	4 December 2007	Second qualifying round	Group Stage	10	5	0	5	13	14	−1	50.00
Total					48	35	4	9	106	43	+63	72.92

Last updated: 17 May 2008
Source: Results

=== Super Cup ===
10 July 2007	Dynamo Kyiv	2–2 (a.e.t.) (4–2 p)	Shakhtar Donetsk	Poltava
EEST (UTC+3)	Mykhalyk 26', 30'; Dedechko (yellow card) 34'	Report	Hladkyi 14'; Polyanskyi (yellow card) 21'; Chyhrynskyi (yellow card) 24'; Tkachenko 55'; Yezerskiy (yellow card) 70'	Stadium: Vorskla Stadium; Attendance: 32,000; Referee: Pieter Vink (Netherlands)
	Penalties
	Aliyev (penalty missed); Ninković (penalty scored); Dedechko (penalty scored); Marković (penalty scored); Morozyuk (penalty scored)		(penalty missed) Brandão; (penalty scored) Fernandinho; (penalty missed) Jádson; (penalty scored) Raț

=== Vyshcha Liha ===
==== League table ====
Pos	Team	Pld	W	D	L	GF	GA	GD	Pts	Qualification or relegation
1	Shakhtar Donetsk (C)	30	24	2	4	75	24	+51	74	Qualification to Champions League third qualifying round
2	Dynamo Kyiv	30	22	5	3	65	26	+39	71	Qualification to Champions League second qualifying round
3	~~Metalist Kharkiv~~ (Note: Metalist Kharkiv was stripped of their bronze award for this season by the Court of Arbitration for Sport in Lausanne in August 2013 for fixing of the match Karpaty Lviv – Metalist (of 19 April 2008).)	30	19	6	5	51	27	+24	63	Qualification to UEFA Cup first round
4	Dnipro Dnipropetrovsk	30	18	5	7	40	27	+13	59	Qualification to UEFA Cup second qualifying round
5	Tavriya Simferopol	30	13	8	9	38	40	−2	47	Qualification to Intertoto Cup second round

Source: uafootball.net.ua
(C) Champions

==== Results summary ====
Overall								Home						Away					
Pld	W	D	L	GF	GA	GD	Pts	W	D	L	GF	GA	GD	W	D	L	GF	GA	GD
30	24	2	4	75	24	+51	74	12	2	1	40	9	+31	12	0	3	35	15	+20

Last updated: 17 May 2008.
Source: Results

==== Results by round ====
Round	1	2	3	4	5	6	7	8	9	10	11	12	13	14	15	16	17	19	20	21	22	23	24	25	26	18	27	28	29	30
Ground	H	A	H	A	H	A	H	H	A	H	A	H	A	H	A	A	H	H	A	H	A	A	H	A	H	A	A	H	A	H
Result	D	W	W	W	W	W	W	W	W	W	W	W	L	W	W	L	D	W	W	W	L	W	L	W	W	W	W	W	W	W
Position																														

Updated to match(es) played on 17 May 2008. Source: Results
A = Away; H = Home; W = Win; D = Draw; L = Loss

==== Results ====
15 July 2007 1	Shakhtar Donetsk	1–1	Dynamo Kyiv	Donetsk
19:00 EEST (UTC+3)	Hübschman (yellow card) 23'; Jádson 60'; Chyhrynskyi (yellow card) 80'	Report	Mykhalyk (yellow card) 17'; Rodrigo (yellow card) 21'; Rincón 25' (yellow card) 31'; Rebrov (yellow card) 68'	Stadium: RSC Olimpiyskiy; Attendance: 25,500; Referee: Herbert Fandel

21 July 2007 2	Naftovyk Okhtyrka	0–3	Shakhtar Donetsk	Okhtyrka
17:00 EEST (UTC+3)	Davydov (yellow card) 21'; Kretov (yellow card) 68'; Snytko (yellow card) 70'	Report	Lewandowski 52'; Hladkyi 54', 62'; Jádson (yellow card) 61'; Fomin (yellow card) 80'; Srna (yellow card) 85'	Stadium: Naftovyk Stadium; Attendance: 5,200; Referee: Orest Shmygelskyi

27 July 2007 3	Shakhtar Donetsk	3–0	Zorya Luhansk	Donetsk
19:00 EEST (UTC+3)	Jádson 22'; Hladkyi 34', 43' (penalty missed) 43'; Fernandinho (yellow card) 82'	Report		Stadium: RSC Olimpiyskiy; Attendance: 18,500; Referee: Sergey Berezka

5 August 2007 4	Zakarpattia Uzhhorod	0–1	Shakhtar Donetsk	Uzhhorod
17:00 EEST (UTC+3)	Kozoriz (yellow card) 25'	Report	Jádson (yellow card) 38'; Brandão 81'	Stadium: Avanhard Stadium; Attendance: 11,650; Referee: Yevhen Herenda

11 August 2007 5	Shakhtar Donetsk	2–1	Vorskla Poltava	Donetsk
19:00 EEST (UTC+3)	Duljaj (yellow card) 8'; Fernandinho 54'; Jádson (yellow card) 69'; Hladkyi 79'	Report	Pukanych (yellow card) 30'; Grumić 32'; Dallku (yellow card) 72'	Stadium: RSC Olimpiyskiy; Attendance: 16,500; Referee: Igor Ishchenko

19 August 2007 6	Metalist Kharkiv	1–3	Shakhtar Donetsk	Kharkiv
17:00 EEST (UTC+3)	Rykun (penalty missed) 45+1'; Dević 48'	Report	Hladkyi 17'; Jádson (yellow card) 45+1'; Fernandinho 68'; Ilsinho 85'	Stadium: OSC Metalist; Attendance: 20,000; Referee: Serhiy Shebek

25 August 2007 7	Shakhtar Donetsk	2–0	Tavriya Simferopol	Donetsk
19:00 EEST (UTC+3)	Lucarelli 24' (pen.), 41'; Chyhrynskyi (yellow card) 25'; Vukić (yellow card) 29'	Report	Jokšas (yellow card) 3'; Pershin (yellow card) 82'	Stadium: RSC Olimpiyskiy; Attendance: 17,000; Referee: Yury Moseychuk

1 September 2007 8	Shakhtar Donetsk	4–1	Arsenal Kyiv	Donetsk
17:00 EEST (UTC+3)	Jádson (yellow card) 49'; Brandão 50', 90+2'; Hladkyi 53'; Ilsinho 64'	Report	Romanchuk (yellow card) 42'; Essola (red card) 45+3'; Deonas (yellow card) 50'; Bala 57'	Stadium: RSC Olimpiyskiy; Attendance: 18,500; Referee: Viktor Shvetsov

15 September 2007 9	Chornomorets Odesa	1–2	Shakhtar Donetsk	Odesa
19:00 EEST (UTC+3)	Valeyev (yellow card) 35'; Venhlinskyi 62'	Report	Jádson (yellow card) 17'; Lucarelli 22' (pen.); Chyhrynskyi 52'; Fernandinho (yellow card) 63'; Shevchuk (yellow card) 68'	Stadium: Chornomorets Stadium; Attendance: 10,500; Referee: Orest Shmygelskyi

23 September 2007 10	Shakhtar Donetsk	4–1	Dnipro Dnipropetrovsk	Donetsk
19:00 EEST (UTC+3)	Srna (yellow card) 32'; Raț 48'; Brandão 52' (pen.), 76'; Hladkyi 70'	Report	Vorobey (yellow card) 5' (goal) 20'; Nazarenko (yellow card) 34'	Stadium: RSC Olimpiyskiy; Attendance: 24,700; Referee: Paolo Tagliavento

29 September 2007 11	Metalurh Zaporizhzhia	1–3	Shakhtar Donetsk	Zaporizhzhia
17:00 EEST (UTC+3)	Chelyadinsky 32'; Lyubarskyi (yellow card) 38'; Stepanenko (yellow card) 82'	Report	Brandão 3' (yellow card) 40'; Hladkyi 47', 61'; Raț (yellow card) 60'; Srna (yellow card) 82'	Stadium: Slavutych-Arena; Attendance: 12,000; Referee: Andriy Shandor

7 October 2007 12	Shakhtar Donetsk	3–0	Karpaty Lviv	Donetsk
17:00 EEST (UTC+3)	Ilsinho 40'; Hladkyi 46', 57'; Shevchuk (yellow card) 70'	Report	Tkachuk (yellow card) 12'; Lașcencov (red card) 17'; Khudobyak (yellow card) 44'	Stadium: RSC Olimpiyskiy; Attendance: 21,000; Referee: Yevgeny Wenger

20 October 2007 13	Kryvbas Kryvyi Rih	1–0	Shakhtar Donetsk	Kryvyi Rih
16:00 EEST (UTC+3)	Radchenko (yellow card) 22'; Bulku (yellow card) 40'; Oprya (yellow card) 64'; Motuz (yellow card) 78' (goal) 81'; Sachko (yellow card) 82'; Hidi (yellow card) 90+1'	Report	Chyhrynskyi (yellow card) 60'; Castillo (yellow card) 67'; Srna (yellow card) 90+3'	Stadium: Metalurh Stadium; Attendance: 12,000; Referee: Andriy Shandor

28 October 2007 14	Shakhtar Donetsk	2–1	Kharkiv	Donetsk
16:00 EET (UTC+2)	Hunchak 44' (o.g.) Lucarelli 49' (pen.); Brandão (yellow card) 79'	Report	Sokolenko 23'; Ribeiro (yellow card) 24'; Pankavets (yellow card) 38'; Berezovchuk (yellow card) 85'	Stadium: RSC Olimpiyskiy; Attendance: 19,500; Referee: Oleh Derevinskyi

3 November 2007 15	Metalurh Donetsk	0–1	Shakhtar Donetsk	Donetsk
16:00 EET (UTC+2)	Havryushov (yellow card) 48'; Bulut (yellow card) 60'; Danylovskyi (yellow card) 64'; Dišljenković (yellow card) 74'; Bilozor (yellow card) 87'; Mendoza (yellow card) 88'	Report	Jádson (yellow card) 59'; Brandão (yellow card) 67'; Srna (yellow card) 68'; Ilsinho (red card) 70'; Fernandinho 88'; Pyatov (yellow card) 90+3'	Stadium: Shakhtar Stadium; Attendance: 18,000; Referee: Yury Moseychuk

11 November 2007 16	Dynamo Kyiv	2–1	Shakhtar Donetsk	Kyiv
18:00 EET (UTC+2)	Bangoura 44', 53'; Dopilka (yellow card) 46'; Ghioane (yellow card) 67'	Report	Brandão (yellow card) 35'; Jádson 47' (pen.); Lucarelli (yellow card) 80'	Stadium: Valeriy Lobanovskyi Dynamo Stadium; Attendance: 5,000; Referee: Claus Bo Larsen

24 November 2007 17	Shakhtar Donetsk	1–1	Naftovyk Okhtyrka	Donetsk
16:15 EET (UTC+2)	Castillo (penalty missed) 9'; Hai (yellow card) 16'; Chyhrynskyi 29'; Jádson (yellow card) 36'	Report	Karakevych 17' (pen.)	Stadium: RSC Olimpiyskiy; Attendance: 10,000; Referee: Vladimir Topykha

1 March 2008 19	Shakhtar Donetsk	5–0	Zakarpattia Uzhhorod	Donetsk
14:00 EET (UTC+2)	Jádson 13'; Donets 31' (o.g.); Hladkyi (yellow card) 52' (goal) 55'; Hai 71'; Duljaj 90+3'	Report	Pisnyi (yellow card) 6'; Braila (yellow card) 16'; Mykulyak (yellow card) 17'; Kozoriz (yellow card) 31'	Stadium: RSC Olimpiyskiy; Attendance: 15,000; Referee: Orest Shmygelskyi

9 March 2008 20	Vorskla Poltava	0–1	Shakhtar Donetsk	Poltava
14:00 EET (UTC+2)	Platonov (yellow card) 58'	Report	Fernandinho 70'; Hübschman (yellow card) 80'	Stadium: Oleksiy Butovsky Vorskla Stadium; Attendance: 10,000; Referee: Yevhen Herenda

15 March 2008 21	Shakhtar Donetsk	4–1	Metalist Kharkiv	Donetsk
16:00 EET (UTC+2)	Chyhrynskyi (yellow card) 13' (goal) 41'; Srna (yellow card) 21' (yellow-red card) 48'; Brandão 37' (yellow card) 61'; Jádson (yellow card) 56'; Fernandinho 72' (yellow card) 90+4'; Shust (yellow card) 76'; Luiz Adriano (yellow card) 90+3' (goal) 90+4'	Report	Dević 16' (pen.); Gueye (yellow card) 34'; Edmar (yellow card) 45+3'; Obradović (yellow card) 61'; Zézéto (yellow card) 74'; Babych (yellow card) 86'	Stadium: RSC Olimpiyskiy; Attendance: 24,000; Referee: Oleh Derevinskyi

23 March 2008 22	Tavriya Simferopol	3–2	Shakhtar Donetsk	Simferopol
14:00 EET (UTC+2)	Homenyuk 15', 57'; Hajduczek 21'; Holaydo (yellow card) 25'; Marković (yellow card) 46'; Jokšas (yellow card) 47'; Ljubenović (yellow card) 88'; Dobre (yellow card) 90+4'	Report	Hladkyi (yellow card) 28'; Hübschman (yellow card) 41'; Brandão 42'; Srna (yellow card) 62'; Luiz Adriano (yellow card) 68'; Fernandinho 68' (yellow card) 86' (yellow-red card) 86'	Stadium: RSC Lokomotyv; Attendance: 19,000; Referee: Viktor Shvetsov

30 March 2008 23	Arsenal Kyiv	2–4	Shakhtar Donetsk	Kyiv
14:00 EEST (UTC+3)	Litovchenko (yellow card) 13'; Symonenko (yellow card) 18'; Zakarlyuka 27'; Raspopov (yellow card) 38'; Lysenko 55'; Bala (yellow card) 66'	Report	Lewandowski (yellow card) 6'; Ilsinho (yellow card) 38'; Jádson 51'; Kravchenko 67'; Brandão 74'; Hai 86' (yellow card) 87'; Shust (yellow card) 90+2'	Stadium: NSC Olimpiysky; Attendance: 33,000; Referee: Yury Moseychuk

6 April 2008 24	Shakhtar Donetsk	0–1	Chornomorets Odesa	Donetsk
16:00 EEST (UTC+3)		Report	Karytska 25' (pen.); Biletskyi (yellow card) 33' de la Haza (yellow card) 58'; Rudenko (yellow card) 59'; Venhlinskyi (yellow card) 69'; Kornyev (yellow card) 90+2'	Stadium: RSC Olimpiyskiy; Attendance: 25,000; Referee: Orest Shmygelskyi

12 April 2008 25	Dnipro Dnipropetrovsk	1–3	Shakhtar Donetsk	Dnipro
16:00 EEST (UTC+3)	Nazarenko 29' (pen.); Andriyenko (yellow card) 45+1'; Shelayev (yellow card) 78'	Report	Brandão 8' (yellow card) 39'; Luiz Adriano (yellow card) 10' (goal) 55'; Ilsinho (yellow card) 33'; Raț 45'; Jádson (yellow card) 81'	Stadium: Meteor Stadium; Attendance: 20,000; Referee: Serhiy Shebek

19 April 2008 26	Shakhtar Donetsk	4–0	Metalurh Zaporizhzhia	Donetsk
16:00 EEST (UTC+3)	Luiz Adriano 35'; Jádson 44'; Hladkyi 48' (pen.) (yellow card) 74'; Fernandinho 84'	Report	Postranskyi (yellow card) 35'; Lazarovych (yellow card) 41'; Arzhanov (yellow card) 51'; Hodin (yellow card) 67' (penalty missed) 89'	Stadium: RSC Olimpiyskiy; Attendance: 20,000; Referee: Yevhen Herenda

22 April 2008 18	Zorya Luhansk	1–4	Shakhtar Donetsk	Luhansk
19:00 EEST (UTC+3)	Skoba (yellow card) 7'; Vorobey (yellow card) 13' (goal) 53'	Report	Hladkyi 6', 38'; Ilsinho 18'; Yezerskiy 65'	Stadium: Avanhard Stadium; Attendance: 21,000; Referee: Vitaliy Hodulian

26 April 2008 27	Karpaty Lviv	2–4	Shakhtar Donetsk	Lviv
14:00 EEST (UTC+3)	Feshchuk 22'; Kobin (yellow card) 34'; Khudobyak 48'	Report	Hladkyi 10'; Fernandinho 28'; Brandão 30', 90' (pen.); Yezerskiy (yellow card) 38'	Stadium: Ukraina Stadium; Attendance: 15,300; Referee: Yury Moseychuk

3 May 2008 28	Shakhtar Donetsk	1–0	Kryvbas Kryvyi Rih	Donetsk
17:00 EEST (UTC+3)	Fernandinho 79' (yellow card) 79'	Report	Melnyk (yellow card) 22'; Shahoyka (yellow card) 32' (yellow-red card) 88'; Sachko (yellow card) 38'; Borovyk (yellow card) 67'; Razhkow (yellow card) 90'	Stadium: RSC Olimpiyskiy; Attendance: 21,000; Referee: Yevhen Herenda

11 May 2008 29	Kharkiv	0–3	Shakhtar Donetsk	Kharkiv
18:00 EEST (UTC+3)	Horodov (yellow card) 36'	Report	Kucher 40'; Luiz Adriano 45'; Fernandinho 64' (pen.)	Stadium: OSC Metalist; Attendance: 7,300; Referee: Orest Shmygelskyi

17 May 2008 30	Shakhtar Donetsk	4–1	Metalurh Donetsk	Donetsk
18:00 EEST (UTC+3)	Srna (yellow card) 8'; Jádson 12'; Ilsinho 33'; Fernandinho 37'; Hladkyi (penalty missed) 65'; Kravchenko 66'; Chyhrynskyi (yellow card) 78'	Report	Checher (yellow card) 49'; Kosyrin 50' (yellow card) 80'; Gvozdenović (yellow card) 63'	Stadium: RSC Olimpiyskiy; Attendance: 26,000; Referee: Vladimir Sirenko

=== Ukrainian Cup ===
26 September 2007 Round of 32	MFC Mykolaiv	0–1	Shakhtar Donetsk	Mykolaiv
15:00 EEST (UTC+3)	Lutsenko (yellow card) 39'; Kanyuk (yellow card) 44'; Berbat (yellow card) 88'	Report	Yezerskiy (yellow card) 5'; Pryyomov (yellow card) 24'; Jádson 65' (pen.)	Stadium: Central Stadium; Attendance: 20,000; Referee: Viktor Denysiuk

31 October 2007 Round of 16	Shakhtar Donetsk	4–1	Arsenal Kyiv	Donetsk
19:00 EET (UTC+2)	Hübschman 3'; Brandão 13'; Pryyomov (yellow card) 23'; Willian 60'; Hübschman (yellow card) 68'; Jádson 69'	Report	Khomyn (yellow card) 38'; Essola 44'	Stadium: RSC Olimpiyskiy; Attendance: 10,000; Referee: Vitaliy Hodulyan

8 December 2007 Quarterfinal 1st leg	Vorskla Poltava	0–3	Shakhtar Donetsk	Poltava
14:00 EET (UTC+2)	Chyzhov (yellow card) 26' (red card) 76'; Yarmash (yellow card) 72'	Report	Chyhrynskyi 55'; Hübschman (yellow card) 62'; Fernandinho (yellow card) 73' (goal) 88'; Raț 77' (pen.)	Stadium: Vorskla Stadium; Attendance: 4,500; Referee: Orest Shmyhelsky

12 December 2007 Quarterfinal 2nd leg	Shakhtar Donetsk	1–1 (4–1 agg.)	Vorskla Poltava	Donetsk
16:00 EET (UTC+2)	Shevchuk (yellow card) 11'; Hai 55'	Report	Donets (red card) 28'; Curri 64'	Stadium: RSC Olimpiyskiy; Attendance: 3,000; Referee: Yuriy Moseichuk

19 March 2008 Semifinal 1st leg	Chornomorets Odesa	1–2	Shakhtar Donetsk	Odesa
18:00 EEST (UTC+3)	Karytska 72' (pen.)	Report	Lewandowski 41'; Hübschman (yellow card) 51'; Brandão 64' (pen.); Kravchenko (yellow card) 79'; Duljaj (yellow card) 84'	Stadium: Chornomorets Stadium; Attendance: 14,000; Referee: Serhiy Shebek

16 April 2008 Semifinal 2nd leg	Shakhtar Donetsk	3–0 (5–1 agg.)	Chornomorets Odesa	Donetsk
19:00 EEST (UTC+3)	Luiz Adriano 4'; Kravchenko 72'; Duljaj 74'; Willian (yellow card) 81'	Report	de la Haza (yellow card) 6' (yellow-red card) 19'; Vázquez (yellow card) 35'	Stadium: RSC Olimpiyskiy; Attendance: 17,000; Referee: Ihor Podushkin

7 May 2008 Final	Shakhtar Donetsk	2–0	Dynamo Kyiv	Kharkiv
19:00 EEST (UTC+3)	Kucher (yellow card) 32'; Hladkyi 44' (yellow card) 57' (yellow-red card) 87'; Raț (yellow card) 56'; Brandão (red card) 64'; Hai 78'; Yezerskiy (red card) 80'	Report	Mandzyuk (yellow card) 17'; Aliyev (yellow card) 65'; Diakhaté (red card) 73'; Bangoura (red card) 80'	Stadium: Metalist Stadium; Attendance: 28,000; Referee: Viktor Shvetsov

=== UEFA Champions League ===
==== Qualifying rounds ====
31 July 2007 Second qualifying round 1st leg	Pyunik (Armenia)	0–2	(Ukraine) Shakhtar Donetsk	Yerevan, Armenia
18:00 EEST (UTC+3)	Ha.Mkhitaryan (yellow card) 20'; Avetisyan (yellow card) 24'; Hovsepyan (yellow card) 71'	Report	Hladkyi 45'; Brandão 48'; Chyhrynskyi (yellow card) 90+4'	Stadium: Republican Stadium; Attendance: 8,000; Referee: Stefan Messner (Austria)

8 August 2007 Second qualifying round 2nd leg	Shakhtar Donetsk (Ukraine)	2–1 (4–1 agg.)	(Armenia) Pyunik	Donetsk, Ukraine
20:00 EEST (UTC+3)	Brandão 40'; Hladkyi 49'	Report	Ghazaryan 31'; Yedigaryan (red card) 52'	Stadium: RSC Olimpiyskiy; Attendance: 18,000; Referee: João Lopes Ferreira (Portugal)

15 August 2007 Third qualifying round 1st leg	Red Bull Salzburg (Austria)	1–0	(Ukraine) Shakhtar Donetsk	Salzburg, Austria
21:45 EEST (UTC+3)	Zickler 10' (pen.) (yellow card) 65'; Aufhauser (yellow card) 35'; Kovač (yellow card) 49'; Dudić (yellow card) 51'	Report	Srna (yellow card) 37'; Ilsinho (yellow card) 52'	Stadium: Red Bull Arena; Attendance: 23,690; Referee: Damir Skomina (Slovenia)

29 August 2007 Third qualifying round 2nd leg	Shakhtar Donetsk (Ukraine)	3–1 (3–2 agg.)	(Austria) Red Bull Salzburg	Donetsk, Ukraine
21:45 EEST (UTC+3)	Lucarelli 9' (yellow card) 35'; Lewandowski (yellow card) 35'; Chyhrynskyi (yellow card) 62'; Castillo 79' (pen.) (yellow card) 90+2'; Brandão 87' (yellow card) 88'	Report	Meyer 5'; Aufhauser (yellow card) 35'; Sekagya (yellow card) 77'	Stadium: RSC Olimpiyskiy; Attendance: 26,000; Referee: Laurent Duhamel (France)

==== Group stage ====
Pos	Team	Pld	W	D	L	GF	GA	GD	Pts	Qualification
1	(Italy) Milan	6	4	1	1	12	5	+7	13	Advance to knockout stage
2	(Scotland) Celtic	6	3	0	3	5	6	−1	9	Advance to knockout stage
3	(Portugal) Benfica	6	2	1	3	5	6	−1	7	Transfer to UEFA Cup
4	(Ukraine) Shakhtar Donetsk	6	2	0	4	6	11	−5	6	

Source: RSSSF

18 September 2007 1	Shakhtar Donetsk (Ukraine)	2–0	(Scotland) Celtic	Donetsk, Ukraine
21:45 EEST (UTC+3)	Brandão 5'; Lucarelli 8'; Srna (yellow card) 30'	Report	Brown (yellow card) 17'	Stadium: RSC Olimpiyskiy; Attendance: 25,700; Referee: Alberto Undiano Mallenco (Spain)

3 October 2007 2	Benfica (Portugal)	0–1	(Ukraine) Shakhtar Donetsk	Lisbon, Portugal
21:45 EEST (UTC+3)	Katsouranis (yellow card) 57'; Cardozo (yellow card) 67'; Rodríguez (yellow card) 79'	Report	Jádson 42'; Srna (yellow card) 79'; Fernandinho (yellow card) 82'; Castillo (yellow card) 83'	Stadium: Estádio da Luz; Attendance: 34,647; Referee: Wolfgang Stark (Germany)

24 October 2007 3	Milan (Italy)	4–1	(Ukraine) Shakhtar Donetsk	Milan, Italy
21:45 EEST (UTC+3)	Gilardino 6', 14'; Gattuso (yellow card) 20'; Ambrosini (yellow card) 44'; Seedorf 62', 69'	Report	Brandão (yellow card) 20'; Lucarelli 51' (yellow card) 69'; Fernandinho (yellow card) 74'	Stadium: San Siro; Attendance: 36,850; Referee: Luis Medina Cantalejo (Spain)

6 November 2007 4	Shakhtar Donetsk (Ukraine)	0–3	(Italy) Milan	Donetsk, Ukraine
21:45 EET (UTC+2)	Fernandinho (yellow card) 45'; Ilsinho (yellow card) 45+1'	Report	Gattuso (yellow card) 19'; Kaká (yellow card) 32' (goal) 72'; Inzaghi 66', 90+3'; Ambrosini (yellow card) 71'	Stadium: RSC Olimpiyskiy; Attendance: 25,700; Referee: Pieter Vink (Netherlands)

28 November 2007 5	Celtic (Scotland)	2–1	(Ukraine) Shakhtar Donetsk	Glasgow, Scotland
21:45 EET (UTC+2)	Jarošík (yellow card) 43' (goal) 45'; Vennegoor of Hesselink (yellow card) 56'; Caldwell (yellow card) 80'; Donati 90+2'	Report	Brandão 4' (yellow card) 37'	Stadium: Celtic Park; Attendance: 59,396; Referee: Bertrand Layec (France)

4 December 2007 1	Shakhtar Donetsk (Ukraine)	1–2	(Portugal) Benfica	Donetsk, Ukraine
21:45 EET (UTC+2)	Lucarelli 30' (pen.); Kucher (yellow card) 68'; Brandão (yellow card) 90+4'	Report	Cardozo 6', 22'; Luiz (yellow card) 29'; Luís Filipe (yellow card) 90+1'	Stadium: RSC Olimpiyskiy; Attendance: 24,200; Referee: Kyros Vassaras (Greece)

== Squad statistics ==
As of match played 17 May 2008

=== Appearances and goals ===
No.	Pos	Nat	Player	Total		Vyshcha Liha		Ukrainian Cup		Supercup		UEFA Champions League	
No.	Pos	Nat	Player	Apps	Goals	Apps	Goals	Apps	Goals	Apps	Goals	Apps	Goals
1	GK	(Ukraine) UKR	Bohdan Shust	8	0	5	0	3	0	0	0	0	0
3	DF	(Czech Republic) CZE	Tomáš Hübschman	33	1	19+1	0	5+1	1	0	0	4+3	0
4	DF	(Serbia) SRB	Igor Duljaj	28	2	13+1	1	5+2	1	0+1	0	3+3	0
5	DF	(Ukraine) UKR	Oleksandr Kucher	33	1	19+2	1	3+1	0	0	0	8	0
7	MF	(Brazil) BRA	Fernandinho	41	12	29	11	3	1	1	0	8	0
8	MF	(Brazil) BRA	Jádson	39	10	22+5	7	0+2	2	0+1	0	8+1	1
10	MF	(Serbia) SRB	Zvonimir Vukić	9	0	2+2	0	2+1	0	1	0	0+1	0
12	GK	(Ukraine) UKR	Dmytro Shutkov	2	0	2	0	0	0	0	0	0	0
11	MF	(Brazil) BRA	Ilsinho	33	5	17+3	5	4+1	0	0	0	8	0
13	MF	(Ukraine) UKR	Vyacheslav Shevchuk	15	0	12	0	3	0	0	0	0	0
15	FW	(Ukraine) UKR	Volodymyr Pryyomov	8	0	0+2	0	3	0	1	0	1+1	0
17	FW	(Brazil) BRA	Luiz Adriano	19	5	8+5	4	4+1	1	0	0	1	0
18	DF	(Poland) POL	Mariusz Lewandowski	29	2	12+6	1	2	1	0	0	8+1	0
19	MF	(Ukraine) UKR	Oleksiy Hai	19	4	9+5	2	3+1	2	0+1	0	0	0
21	FW	(Ukraine) UKR	Oleksandr Hladkyi	46	20	19+10	17	4+3	1	1	0	3+6	2
22	MF	(Brazil) BRA	Willian	28	1	6+14	0	3+3	1	0	0	0+2	0
23	MF	(Ukraine) UKR	Kostyantyn Kravchenko	11	3	0+9	2	0+2	1	0	0	0	0
25	FW	(Brazil) BRA	Brandão	39	19	15+10	12	3	2	1	0	9+1	5
26	DF	(Romania) ROU	Răzvan Raț	34	3	18+1	2	4	1	1	0	10	0
27	DF	(Ukraine) UKR	Dmytro Chyhrynskyi	42	4	27	3	6	1	1	0	8	0
28	DF	(Ukraine) UKR	Oleksiy Polyanskyi	4	0	0+1	0	1+1	0	1	0	0	0
30	GK	(Ukraine) UKR	Andriy Pyatov	38	0	23	0	4	0	1	0	10	0
33	DF	(Croatia) CRO	Darijo Srna	41	0	27+1	0	3	0	0	0	9+1	0
37	MF	(Ukraine) UKR	Serhiy Tkachenko	3	0	0+1	0	0	0	1	0	1	0
55	DF	(Ukraine) UKR	Volodymyr Yezerskiy	24	1	12+1	1	6+1	0	1	0	2+1	0
Players away on loan:
9	FW	(Mexico) MEX	Nery Castillo	14	1	5+3	0	0+1	0	0	0	0+5	1
20	FW	(Ukraine) UKR	Oleksiy Byelik	5	0	1+1	0	3	0	0	0	0	0
24	FW	(Ukraine) UKR	Ruslan Fomin	3	0	0+1	0	0	0	0	0	1+1	0
Players who left Shakhtar Donetsk during the season:
29	FW	(Romania) ROU	Ciprian Marica	1	0	0+1	0	0	0	0	0	0	0
99	FW	(Italy) ITA	Cristiano Lucarelli	21	8	9+3	4	0	0	0	0	7+2	4

=== Goalscorers ===
Place	Position	Nation	Number	Name	Vyshcha Liha	Ukrainian Cup	Super Cup	UEFA Champions League	Total
1	FW	(Ukraine)	21	Oleksandr Hladkyi	17	1	1	2	21
2	FW	(Brazil)	25	Brandão	12	2	0	5	18
3	MF	(Brazil)	7	Fernandinho	11	1	0	0	12
4	MF	(Brazil)	8	Jádson	7	2	0	1	10
5	MF	(Brazil)	11	Ilsinho	5	0	0	0	5
5	FW	(Brazil)	17	Luiz Adriano	4	1	0	0	5
7	FW	(Italy)	99	Cristiano Lucarelli	4	0	0	4	4
7	DF	(Ukraine)	27	Dmytro Chyhrynskyi	3	1	0	0	4
7	MF	(Ukraine)	19	Oleksiy Hai	2	2	0	0	4
10	DF	(Romania)	26	Răzvan Raț	2	1	0	0	3
10	MF	(Ukraine)	23	Kostyantyn Kravchenko	2	1	0	0	3
12	DF	(Serbia)	4	Igor Duljaj	1	1	0	0	2
12				Own goal	2	0	0	0	2
14	DF	(Ukraine)	55	Volodymyr Yezerskiy	1	0	0	0	1
14	DF	(Ukraine)	5	Oleksandr Kucher	1	0	0	0	1
14	DF	(Poland)	18	Mariusz Lewandowski	1	1	0	0	1
14	DF	(Czech Republic)	3	Tomáš Hübschman	0	1	0	0	1
14	MF	(Brazil)	22	Willian	0	1	0	0	1
14	MF	(Ukraine)	37	Serhiy Tkachenko	0	0	1	0	0
14	FW	(Mexico)	9	Nery Castillo	0	0	0	1	1
TOTALS					75	16	2	13	106

=== Clean sheets ===
Place	Position	Nation	Number	Name	Vyshcha Liha	Ukrainian Cup	Super Cup	UEFA Champions League	Total
1	GK	(Ukraine)	30	Andriy Pyatov	9	2	0	3	14
1	GK	(Ukraine)	1	Bohdan Shust	2	2	0	0	4
TOTALS					11	4	0	3	18

=== Disciplinary record ===
Number	Nation	Position	Name	Vyshcha Liha		Ukrainian Cup		Super Cup		Champions League		Total	
Number	Nation	Position	Name	Booked	Sent off (straight red)	Booked	Sent off (straight red)	Booked	Sent off (straight red)	Booked	Sent off (straight red)	Booked	Sent off (straight red)
1	(Ukraine)	GK	Bohdan Shust	2	0	0	0	0	0	0	0	2	0
3	(Czech Republic)	DF	Tomáš Hübschman	3	0	3	0	0	0	1	0	7	0
4	(Serbia)	MF	Igor Duljaj	1	0	1	0	0	0	0	0	2	0
5	(Ukraine)	DF	Oleksandr Kucher	0	0	1	0	0	0	1	0	2	0
7	(Brazil)	MF	Fernandinho	6	1	1	0	0	0	3	0	10	1
8	(Brazil)	MF	Jádson	10	0	0	0	0	0	0	0	10	0
10	(Serbia)	MF	Zvonimir Vukić	1	0	0	0	0	0	0	0	1	0
11	(Brazil)	MF	Ilsinho	2	1	0	0	0	0	2	0	4	1
13	(Ukraine)	MF	Vyacheslav Shevchuk	2	0	1	0	0	0	0	0	3	0
15	(Ukraine)	FW	Volodymyr Pryyomov	0	0	2	0	0	0	0	0	2	0
17	(Brazil)	FW	Luiz Adriano	3	0	0	0	0	0	0	0	3	0
18	(Poland)	DF	Mariusz Lewandowski	1	0	0	0	0	0	1	0	2	0
19	(Ukraine)	MF	Oleksiy Hai	2	0	0	0	0	0	0	0	2	0
21	(Ukraine)	FW	Oleksandr Hladkyi	3	0	2	1	0	0	0	0	5	1
22	(Brazil)	MF	Willian	0	0	1	0	0	0	0	0	1	0
23	(Ukraine)	MF	Kostyantyn Kravchenko	0	0	1	0	0	0	0	0	1	0
25	(Brazil)	FW	Brandão	6	1	0	0	0	0	4	0	10	1
26	(Romania)	DF	Răzvan Raț	1	0	1	0	0	0	0	0	2	0
27	(Ukraine)	DF	Dmytro Chyhrynskyi	5	0	0	0	1	0	2	0	8	0
28	(Ukraine)	DF	Oleksiy Polyanskyi	0	0	0	0	1	0	0	0	1	0
30	(Ukraine)	GK	Andriy Pyatov	1	0	0	0	0	0	0	0	1	0
33	(Croatia)	DF	Darijo Srna	9	1	0	0	0	0	3	0	12	1
55	(Ukraine)	DF	Volodymyr Yezerskiy	1	0	1	1	1	0	0	0	3	1
Players away on loan:
9	(Mexico)	FW	Nery Castillo	1	0	0	0	0	0	2	0	3	0
24	(Ukraine)	FW	Ruslan Fomin	1	0	0	0	0	0	0	0	1	0
Players who left Shakhtar Donetsk during the season:
99	(Italy)	FW	Cristiano Lucarelli	1	0	0	0	0	0	2	0	3	0
			TOTALS	62	4	15	2	3	0	20	0	100	6
