= 2008–09 FC Shakhtar Donetsk season =

Shakhtar Donetsk
2008–09 season
- Chairman: Rinat Akhmetov
- Manager: Mircea Lucescu
- Ground: RSC Olimpiyskiy
- Premier League: 2nd
- Ukrainian Cup: Runners-up
- Super Cup: Winners
- Champions League: Group stage
- UEFA Cup: Winners
- Top goalscorer: League: Yevhen Seleznyov (6 goals); All: Fernandinho; Jádson (12 each)
- Highest home attendance: 25,500 vs Marseille (9 April 2009)
- Lowest home attendance: 8,300 vs Kryvbas Kryvyi Rih (18 October 2008)
- Average home league attendance: 18,368 (23 May 2009)
Home colours	Away colours

During the 2008–09 Ukrainian football season, FC Shakhtar Donetsk competed in the Ukrainian Premier League.

== Season summary ==
Though Shakhtar failed to retain the league or cup, they made up for it by becoming the first Ukrainian team to win the UEFA Cup, defeating Werder Bremen in the final after extra time.

This season was the last played at RSC Olimpiyskiy. From the 2009–10 season onwards, Shakhtar played in the Donbas Arena.

On 28 May 2008, Shakhtar Donetsk announced the signing of Marcelo Moreno from Cruzeiro on a five-year contract. On the same day, Shakhtar also announced the signing of Oleksandr Chyzhov from Vorskla Poltava.

In January 2009, Shakhtar Donetsk sold Brandão to Marseille for a fee of €6,000,000.

On 9 February, Leonardo signed a new contract with Shakhtar Donetsk, until 28 June 2013, and joined Vasco da Gama on loan until 30 November 2009.

== Squad ==
As of match played 31 May 2009

Number	Name	Nationality	Position	Date of birth (age)	Signed from	Signed in	Contract ends	Apps.	Goals
Goalkeepers
1	Bohdan Shust	(Ukraine)	GK	4 March 1986 (aged 23)	Karpaty Lviv	2005			
12	Rustam Khudzhamov	(Ukraine)	GK	5 October 1982 (aged 26)	Kharkiv	2008		9	0
30	Andriy Pyatov	(Ukraine)	GK	28 June 1984 (aged 24)	Vorskla Poltava	2007		82	0
35	Yuriy Virt	(Ukraine)	GK	4 May 1974 (aged 35)	Metalurh Donetsk	2007			
Defenders
3	Tomáš Hübschman	(Czech Republic)	DF	4 September 1981 (aged 27)	Sparta Prague	2004	2009	161	7
4	Igor Duljaj	(Serbia)	DF	29 October 1979 (aged 29)	Partizan	2004		177	6
5	Oleksandr Kucher	(Ukraine)	DF	22 October 1982 (aged 26)	Metalist Kharkiv	2004		85	2
13	Vyacheslav Shevchuk	(Ukraine)	DF	13 May 1979 (aged 30)	Dnipro Dnipropetrovsk	2005		106	0
18	Mariusz Lewandowski	(Poland)	DF	18 May 1979 (aged 30)	Dyskobolia Grodzisk	2001		256	28
26	Răzvan Raț	(Romania)	DF	26 May 1981 (aged 28)	Rapid București	2003		214	9
27	Dmytro Chyhrynskyi	(Ukraine)	DF	7 November 1986 (aged 22)	Academy	2002		129	10
28	Oleksiy Polyanskyi	(Ukraine)	DF	12 April 1986 (aged 23)	Metalurh Donetsk	2006			
32	Mykola Ishchenko	(Ukraine)	DF	9 March 1983 (aged 26)	Karpaty Lviv	2008		27	0
33	Darijo Srna (Captain)	(Croatia)	DF	1 May 1982 (aged 27)	Hajduk Split	2003		225	16
36	Oleksandr Chyzhov	(Ukraine)	DF	10 August 1986 (aged 22)	Vorskla Poltava	2008		9	0
44	Artem Fedetskyi	(Ukraine)	DF	26 April 1985 (aged 24)	Kharkiv	2008		9	1
55	Volodymyr Yezerskiy	(Ukraine)	DF	15 November 1976 (aged 32)	Dnipro Dnipropetrovsk	2007			
Midfielders
7	Fernandinho	(Brazil)	MF	4 May 1985 (aged 24)	Paranaense	2005	2010	157	30
8	Jádson	(Brazil)	MF	5 October 1983 (aged 25)	Paranaense	2005	2009	176	39
11	Ilsinho	(Brazil)	MF	12 October 1985 (aged 23)	São Paulo	2007	2011	60	9
19	Oleksiy Hai	(Ukraine)	MF	6 November 1982 (aged 26)	Illichivets Mariupol	2000		150	15
22	Willian	(Brazil)	MF	9 August 1988 (aged 20)	Corinthians	2007	2012	80	9
23	Kostyantyn Kravchenko	(Ukraine)	MF	24 September 1986 (aged 22)	Dnipro Dnipropetrovsk	2008		6	0
Forwards
9	Nery Castillo	(Mexico)	FW	13 June 1984 (aged 24)	Olympiacos	2007	2012	18	2
10	Yevhen Seleznyov	(Ukraine)	FW	20 July 1985 (aged 23)	Academy	2002		31	11
15	Volodymyr Pryyomov	(Ukraine)	FW	2 January 1986 (aged 23)	Metalurh Donetsk	2007			
17	Luiz Adriano	(Brazil)	FW	12 April 1987 (aged 22)	Internacional	2007		54	14
21	Oleksandr Hladkyi	(Ukraine)	FW	24 August 1987 (aged 21)	Kharkiv	2007		88	28
24	Ruslan Fomin	(Ukraine)	FW	2 March 1986 (aged 23)	Arsenal Kharkiv	2005		15	3
99	Marcelo Moreno	(Bolivia)	FW	18 June 1987 (aged 21)	Cruzeiro	2008		21	3
Away on loan
	Jan Laštůvka	(Czech Republic)	GK	7 July 1982 (aged 26)	Baník Ostrava	2004		63	0
	Leonardo	(Brazil)	DF	9 March 1986 (aged 23)	Santos	2005	2013	23	0
Players who left during the season
25	Brandão	(Brazil)	FW	16 June 1980 (aged 28)	Iraty	2002		220	91

== Transfers ==
=== In ===
Date	Position	Nationality	Name	From	Fee	Ref.
22 May 2008	DF	(Ukraine)	Mykola Ishchenko	Karpaty Lviv	Undisclosed	
25 May 2008	GK	(Ukraine)	Rustam Khudzhamov	Kharkiv	€80,000	
28 May 2008	DF	(Ukraine)	Oleksandr Chyzhov	Vorskla Poltava	₴8,000,000	
28 May 2008	FW	(Bolivia)	Marcelo Moreno	Cruzeiro	€9,000,000	
1 July 2008	DF	(Ukraine)	Artem Fedetskyi	Karpaty Lviv	Undisclosed	

† Moreno's move was announced on the above date, but was not finalised until the transfer window opened on 1 July 2008,

=== Out ===
Date	Position	Nationality	Name	To	Fee	Ref.
13 January 2009	FW	(Brazil)	Brandão	Marseille	€6,000,000	

=== Loans out ===
Date From	Position	Nationality	Name	To	Date To	Ref.
25 March 2008	DF	(Brazil)	Leonardo	São Caetano	30 November 2008	
3 August 2008	GK	(Czech Republic)	Jan Laštůvka	West Ham United	End of season	
9 February 2009	DF	(Brazil)	Leonardo	Vasco da Gama	18 June 2009	

== Competitions ==
=== Overall ===
Competition	First match	Last match	Starting round	Final position	Record							
Competition	First match	Last match	Starting round	Final position	Pld	W	D	L	GF	GA	GD	Win %
Premier League	20 July 2008	26 May 2009	Matchday 1	2nd	30	19	7	4	47	16	+31	63.33
Ukrainian Cup	12 September 2008	31 May 2009	Round of 32	Runners Up	5	4	0	1	10	3	+7	80.00
Super Cup	15 July 2008		Final	Champions	1	0	1	0	1	1	+0	0.00
UEFA Champions League	13 August 2008	9 December 2008	Third qualifying round	Group Stage	8	5	0	3	16	8	+8	62.50
UEFA Cup	19 February 2009	20 May 2009	Round of 32	Champions	9	6	2	1	14	6	+8	66.67
Total					53	34	10	9	88	34	+54	64.15

Last updated: 31 May 2009
Source: Results

=== Super Cup ===
15 July 2008	Shakhtar Donetsk	1–1 (a.e.t.) (5–3 p)	Dynamo Kyiv	Poltava
20:45 EEST (UTC+3)	Chyhrynskyi 14'; Srna (yellow card) 86'	Report	Ghioane (yellow card) 17'; Milevskyi 38'; Diakhaté (yellow card) 48'	Stadium: Vorskla Stadium; Attendance: 24,850; Referee: Wolfgang Stark (Germany)
	Penalties
	Fernandinho (penalty scored); Raț (penalty scored); Chyhrynskyi (penalty scored); Srna (penalty scored); Brandão (penalty scored)		(penalty scored) Yarmolenko; (penalty missed) Diakhaté; (penalty scored) Ninković; (penalty scored) Aliyev

=== Premier League ===
==== League table ====
Pos	Team	Pld	W	D	L	GF	GA	GD	Pts	Qualification or relegation
1	Dynamo Kyiv (C)	30	26	1	3	71	19	+52	79	Qualification to Champions League group stage
2	Shakhtar Donetsk	30	19	7	4	47	16	+31	64	Qualification to Champions League third qualifying round
3	Metalist Kharkiv	30	17	8	5	44	25	+19	59	Qualification to Europa League third qualifying round
4	Metalurh Donetsk	30	14	7	9	36	27	+9	49	Qualification to Europa League second qualifying round
5	Vorskla Poltava	30	14	7	9	32	26	+6	49	Qualification to Europa League play-off round

Source: uafootball.net.ua
Rules for classification: 1st points; 2nd overall wins; 3rd goal difference; 4th goals scored
(C) Champions

==== Results summary ====
Overall								Home						Away					
Pld	W	D	L	GF	GA	GD	Pts	W	D	L	GF	GA	GD	W	D	L	GF	GA	GD
30	19	7	4	47	16	+31	64	12	3	0	30	8	+22	7	4	4	17	8	+9

Last updated: 26 May 2009.
Source: Results

==== Results by round ====
Round	1	2	3	4	5	6	7	8	9	10	11	12	13	14	15	16	17	18	19	20	21	22	23	24	25	26	27	28	29	30
Ground	A	A	H	A	H	A	H	A	H	A	H	A	H	A	H	H	H	A	H	A	H	A	H	A	H	A	H	A	H	A
Result	L	D	W	D	D	L	D	D	D	W	W	D	W	W	W	W	W	W	W	W	W	L	W	W	W	W	W	W	W	L
Position	15	13	7	8	7	9	11	11	11	10	8	8	7	7	5	5	5	5	3	2	2	3	2	2	2	2	2	2	2	2

Updated to match(es) played on 26 May 2009. Source: Results
A = Away; H = Home; W = Win; D = Draw; L = Loss

==== Results ====
20 July 2008 1	Lviv	2–0	Shakhtar Donetsk	Lviv
19:00 EEST (UTC+3)	Vashchuk (yellow card) 21'; Panas 23'; Baranets (yellow card) 57'; Dankiv (yellow card) 72'; Fedorchuk 90+1'	Report	Brandão (yellow card) 60'; Srna (yellow card) 79'; Hladkyi (yellow card) 85'	Stadium: Ukraina Stadium; Attendance: 21,400; Referee: Vladimir Sirenko

27 July 2008 2	Karpaty Lviv	1–1	Shakhtar Donetsk	Lviv
19:00 EEST (UTC+3)	Zenjov 56'; Khudobyak (yellow card) 68'	Report	Brandão (yellow card) 76'; Fernandinho 81'	Stadium: Ukraina Stadium; Attendance: 22,800; Referee: Yevhen Herenda

3 August 2008 3	Shakhtar Donetsk	3–0	Illichivets Mariupol	Donetsk
19:00 EEST (UTC+3)	Srna 5' (yellow card) 48'; Fernandinho (red card) 63'; Seleznyov 83'; Brandão 85'	Report	Vorobey (yellow card) 33'	Stadium: RSC Olimpiyskiy; Attendance: 18,500; Referee: Sergey Zadiran

8 August 2008 4	Dnipro Dnipropetrovsk	0–0	Shakhtar Donetsk	Dnipro
20:30 EEST (UTC+3)	M.Pashayev (yellow card) 52'; Lyopa (yellow card) 74'	Report		Stadium: Dnipro-Arena; Attendance: 11,000; Referee: Andriy Shandor

17 August 2008 5	Shakhtar Donetsk	2–2	Metalist Kharkiv	Donetsk
19:00 EEST (UTC+3)	Brandão 54', 76' (pen.); Chyhrynskyi (yellow card) 56'; Fedetskyi (yellow card) 65'; Seleznyov (yellow card) 85'	Report	Jajá 19'; Edmar (yellow card) 44'; Bordian 45+1'; Obradović (yellow card) 50'; Gueye (yellow card) 61'; Dević (yellow card) 64' (yellow-red card) 78'; Horyainov (yellow card) 83'; Gancarczyk (yellow card) 85'	Stadium: RSC Olimpiyskiy; Attendance: 20,000; Referee: Vitaliy Hodulian

23 August 2008 6	Vorskla Poltava	1–0	Shakhtar Donetsk	Poltava
19:00 EEST (UTC+3)	Kravchenko 5'; Kulakov (yellow card) 53'; Curri (yellow card) 55'	Report	Fedetskyi (yellow card) 62'; Srna (yellow card) 79'; Chyhrynskyi (yellow card) 85'; Jádson (red card) 90+3'	Stadium: Oleksiy Butovsky Vorskla Stadium; Attendance: 13,00; Referee: Eugene Wenger

31 August 2008 7	Shakhtar Donetsk	2–2	Metalurh Zaporizhzhia	Donetsk
17:00 EEST (UTC+3)	Fernandinho 35' (pen.) (yellow card) 47'; Seleznyov 44'	Report	Alozie (yellow card) 12' (goal) 80'; Arzhanov (yellow card) 33'; Nevmyvaka (yellow card) 35'; Stepanenko (yellow card) 48'; Chelyadzinski (yellow card) 72'	Stadium: RSC Olimpiyskiy; Attendance: 16,000; Referee: Serhiy Shebek

21 September 2008 8	Arsenal Kyiv	0–0	Shakhtar Donetsk	Kyiv
17:00 EEST (UTC+3)	Khomin (yellow card) 51'; Yevseyev (yellow card) 53'; Symonenko (yellow card) 80'	Report	Luiz Adriano (yellow card) 80'; Srna (yellow card) 85'	Stadium: Valeriy Lobanovskyi Dynamo Stadium; Attendance: 800; Referee: Vitaly Godulyan

27 September 2008 9	Shakhtar Donetsk	1–1	Metalurh Donetsk	Donetsk
19:00 EEST (UTC+3)	Seleznyov (yellow card) 11'; Ilsinho (yellow card) 39' (goal) 50'; Brandão (yellow card) 61'; Chyhrynskyi (yellow card) 90+3'	Report	Dimitrov 90'	Stadium: RSC Olimpiyskiy; Attendance: 20,000; Referee: Oleg Zubarev

5 October 2008 10	Chornomorets Odesa	0–3	Shakhtar Donetsk	Odesa
17:00 EEST (UTC+3)	Vázquez (yellow card) 14'; Shandruk (yellow card) 32'; Nizhegorodov (yellow card) 47'	Report	Luiz Adriano (yellow card) 17' (goal) 90+1', 90+3'; Fernandinho (penalty missed) 22'; Hladkyi 28'	Stadium: Central Stadium; Attendance: 9,000; Referee: Andriy Shandor

18 October 2008 11	Shakhtar Donetsk	4–2	Kryvbas Kryvyi Rih	Donetsk
16:00 EEST (UTC+3)	Brandão 16', 71'; Srna 48'; Hladkyi 69'	Report	Balabanov (yellow card) 5'; Maksymov 11'; Shahoyka (yellow card) 56'; Kostyshyn 85'	Stadium: RSC Olimpiyskiy; Attendance: 8,300; Referee: Igor Ishchenko

26 October 2008 12	Kharkiv	0–0	Shakhtar Donetsk	Sumy
16:00 EET (UTC+2)	Ivanov (yellow card) 16'; Hunchak (yellow card) 39'; Stoyko (yellow card) 68'	Report	Duljaj (yellow card) 22'; Fernandinho (yellow card) 58'; Brandão (yellow card) 60' (red card) 88'; Chyhrynskyi (yellow card) 70'	Stadium: Yuvileiny Stadium; Attendance: 8,000; Referee: Oleh Oriekhov

1 November 2008 13	Shakhtar Donetsk	3–1	Zorya Luhansk	Donetsk
14:00 EET (UTC+2)	Moreno 23', 80'; Willian (yellow card) 39' (goal) 69'	Report	Xhihani 3'; S.Kolesnychenko (yellow card) 13'; Hrinchenko (yellow card) 56'	Stadium: RSC Olimpiyskiy; Attendance: 13,000; Referee: Sergey Dankovsky

8 November 2008 14	Tavriya Simferopol	0–2	Shakhtar Donetsk	Simferopol
17:00 EET (UTC+2)		Report	Fernandinho 19'; Seleznyov 71'	Stadium: RSK Lokomotiv Stadium; Attendance: 7,000; Referee: Orest Shmigelsky

16 November 2008 15	Shakhtar Donetsk	1–0	Dynamo Kyiv	Donetsk
16:00 EET (UTC+2)	Fernandinho (yellow card) 30'; Willian 34'; Brandão (yellow card) 52'; Kucher (yellow card) 86'	Report	Aliyev (yellow card) 36'; Sablić (yellow card) 73'; Bangoura (yellow card) 90+1'	Stadium: RSC Olimpiyskiy; Attendance: 21,000; Referee: Peter Fröjdfeldt (Sweden)

21 November 2008 16	Shakhtar Donetsk	2–0	Lviv	Donetsk
18:00 EET (UTC+2)	Hai 54'; Luiz Adriano 60'	Report	Zhdanov (yellow card) 55'	Stadium: RSC Olimpiyskiy; Attendance: 10,000; Referee: Evgeniy Venger

30 November 2008 17	Shakhtar Donetsk	1–0	Karpaty Lviv	Donetsk
15:00 EET (UTC+2)	Ishchenko (yellow card) 28'; Seleznyov (yellow card) 64'; Hladkyi 67'	Report	Oshchypko (yellow card) 9'; Petrivskyi (yellow card) 35'; Fedoriv (yellow card) 57'; Tkachuk (yellow card) 82'	Stadium: RSC Olimpiyskiy; Attendance: 9,000; Referee: Evgeny Abrosimov

2 March 2009 18	Illichivets Mariupol	1–2	Shakhtar Donetsk	Mariupol
19:00 EET (UTC+2)	Kirylchyk (yellow card) 39'; Kashewski 52'; Savin (yellow card) 64'; Vorobey (yellow card) 82'	Report	Hai 22'; Srna 82'	Stadium: Illichivets Stadium; Attendance: 7,000; Referee: Oleg Zubarev

7 March 2009 19	Shakhtar Donetsk	1–0	Dnipro Dnipropetrovsk	Donetsk
16:00 EET (UTC+2)	Fernandinho 34' (pen.)	Report	Serdyuk (yellow card) 33'; Lysytskyi (yellow card) 37'; Kankava (yellow card) 41'	Stadium: RSC Olimpiyskiy; Attendance: 18,000; Referee: Vladimir Sirenko

15 March 2009 20	Metalist Kharkiv	0–3	Shakhtar Donetsk	Kharkiv
17:00 EET (UTC+2)	Obradović (yellow card) 30'; Acevedo (yellow card) 55'	Report	Fernandinho 17' (pen.); Hladkyi (yellow card) 19'; Luiz Adriano 45'; Chyhrynskyi 90+2'	Stadium: OSC Metalist; Attendance: 21,000; Referee: Oleh Oriekhov

22 March 2009 21	Shakhtar Donetsk	1–0	Vorskla Poltava	Donetsk
16:00 EET (UTC+2)	Chyzhov (yellow card) 38'; Srna 48'; Jádson (yellow card) 90'	Report		Stadium: RSC Olimpiyskiy; Attendance: 16,000; Referee: Igor Ishchenko

5 April 2009 22	Metalurh Zaporizhzhia	1–0	Shakhtar Donetsk	Zaporizhzhia
16:00 EEST (UTC+3)	Nevmyvaka 5'; Vernydub (yellow card) 29'; Stepanenko (yellow card) 58'; Silyuk (yellow card) 78'; Kalonas (yellow card) 82'	Report	Jádson (yellow card) 88'	Stadium: Slavutych-Arena; Attendance: 12,800; Referee: Ihor Pokydko

12 April 2009 23	Shakhtar Donetsk	3–0	Arsenal Kyiv	Donetsk
16:00 EEST (UTC+3)	Hladkyi 51'; Lewandowski 73'; Jádson 79'	Report		Stadium: RSC Olimpiyskiy; Attendance: 17,000; Referee: Yuriy Grisio

19 April 2009 24	Metalurh Donetsk	1–2	Shakhtar Donetsk	Donetsk
16:00 EEST (UTC+3)	Sytnik (yellow card) 42'; Checher (yellow card) 43'; Fernandes 52'; Makrides (yellow card) 79'; Dimitrov (yellow card) 85'	Report	Checher 15' (o.g.); Hübschman 54'; Srna (yellow card) 87'	Stadium: Metalurh Stadium; Attendance: 3,500; Referee: Yevhen Herenda

25 April 2009 25	Shakhtar Donetsk	1–0	Chornomorets Odesa	Donetsk
16:00 EEST (UTC+3)	Willian 47'	Report	Didenko (yellow card) 39'; Bondarenko (yellow card) 71'	Stadium: RSC Olimpiyskiy; Attendance: 16,000; Referee: Sergey Dankovsky

3 May 2009 26	Kryvbas Kryvyi Rih	0–1	Shakhtar Donetsk	Kryvyi Rih
17:00 EEST (UTC+3)	Bulku (yellow card) 35'; Melaschenko (yellow card) 48'; Maksymov (yellow card) 51'; Shelayev (yellow card) 59'; Bylykbashi (yellow card) 83'	Report	Jádson (red card) 45'; Seleznyov 71'; Ilsinho (yellow card) 83'; Hübschman (yellow card) 88'	Stadium: Metalurh Stadium; Attendance: 10,000; Referee: Vitaly Godulyan

10 May 2009 27	Shakhtar Donetsk	3–0	Kharkiv	Donetsk
16:00 EEST (UTC+3)	Seleznyov 28'; Willian 33'; Duljaj 77'	Report		Stadium: RSC Olimpiyskiy; Attendance: 10,000; Referee: Evgeniy Venger

16 May 2009 28	Zorya Luhansk	0–3	Shakhtar Donetsk	Luhansk
18:00 EEST (UTC+3)	Kurilov (yellow card) 64'	Report	Seleznyov 28', 74'; Willian 80'	Stadium: Avanhard Stadium; Attendance: 18,000; Referee: Sergei Zadiran

23 May 2009 29	Shakhtar Donetsk	2–0	Tavriya Simferopol	Donetsk
16:00 EEST (UTC+3)	Fedetskyi 33' (yellow card) 34'; Castillo 73'	Report		Stadium: RSC Olimpiyskiy; Attendance: 18,000; Referee: Oleh Derevinskyi

26 May 2009 30	Dynamo Kyiv	1–0	Shakhtar Donetsk	Kyiv
18:00 EEST (UTC+3)	El Kaddouri (yellow card) 14'; Aliyev (yellow card) 62'; Milevskyi 79'	Report	Hübschman (yellow card) 45'	Stadium: Valeriy Lobanovskyi Dynamo Stadium; Attendance: 15,800; Referee: Yevhen Herenda

=== Ukrainian Cup ===
12 September 2008 Round of 32	Illichivets Mariupol	0–3	Shakhtar Donetsk	Mariupol
17:00 EEST (UTC+3)		Report	Jádson 40'; Ilsinho 69'; Luiz Adriano 81'	Stadium: Illichivets Stadium; Attendance: 8,500; Referee: Oleksandr Shamych

29 October 2008 Round of 16	Zakarpattia Uzhhorod	1–4	Shakhtar Donetsk	Uzhhorod
14:00 EET (UTC+2)	S.Kostiuk 71'	Report	Seleznyov 14'; Ishchenko (yellow card) 38'; Willian 48'; Moreno (yellow card) 59' (goal) 63'; Fedetskyi (yellow card) 76'; Raț 87' (pen.)	Stadium: Avanhard Stadium; Attendance: 8,000; Referee: Orest Shmyhelsky

11 November 2008 Quarterfinal	Oleksandriya	1–2	Shakhtar Donetsk	Oleksandria
17:00 EET (UTC+2)	Y.Bulychiv (yellow card) 29'; O.Kazaniuk 41'; Hitchenko (yellow card) 56'	Report	Gai (yellow card) 22'; Seleznyov 34' (pen.); Hladkyy 90+2'	Stadium: CSC Nika Stadium; Attendance: 6,000; Referee: Oleh Derevinskyi

13 May 2009 Semifinal	Shakhtar Donetsk	1–0	Dynamo Kyiv	Donetsk
19:45 EEST (UTC+3)	Ilsinho (yellow card) 39'; Lewandowski 83'; Pyatov (yellow card) 90'	Report	Milevskyi (yellow card) 27'; El Kaddouri (yellow card) 51'; Aliyev (yellow card) 85'	Stadium: RSC Olimpiyskiy; Attendance: 23,000; Referee: Yuriy Mozharovskyi

==== Final ====
31 May 2009	Vorskla Poltava	1–0	Shakhtar Donetsk	Dnipropetrovsk
17:00 EEST (UTC+3)	Sachko 50'; Chesnakov (yellow card) 90+2'	Report	Fernandinho (red card) 57'	Stadium: Dnipro Stadium; Attendance: 25,700; Referee: Vitaliy Hodulyan

=== UEFA Champions League ===
==== Qualifying rounds ====
13 August 2008 Third qualifying round 1st leg	Shakhtar Donetsk (Ukraine)	2–0	(Croatia) Dinamo Zagreb	Donetsk, Ukraine
20:00 EEST (UTC+3)	Srna 3'; Jádson (yellow card) 25' (goal) 31'; Hladkyy (yellow card) 61'	Report	Hrgović (yellow card) 2'; Mikić (yellow card) 47'; Etto (yellow card) 60'	Stadium: RSC Olimpiyskiy; Attendance: 24,810; Referee: Florian Meyer (Germany)

27 August 2008 Third qualifying round 2nd leg	Dinamo Zagreb (Croatia)	1–3 (1–5 agg.)	(Ukraine) Shakhtar Donetsk	Zagreb, Croatia
21:45 EEST (UTC+3)	Balaban (yellow card) 20' (goal) 57'; Hrgović (yellow card) 40'; Chago (yellow card) 74'	Report	Hübschman (yellow card) 25'; Luiz Adriano 42'; Brandão 59'; Willian 70'	Stadium: Stadion Maksimir; Attendance: 13,655; Referee: Mike Riley (England)

==== Group stage ====
Pos	Team	Pld	W	D	L	GF	GA	GD	Pts	Qualification
1	(Spain) Barcelona	6	4	1	1	18	8	+10	13	Advance to knockout phase
2	(Portugal) Sporting CP	6	4	0	2	8	8	0	12	Advance to knockout phase
3	(Ukraine) Shakhtar Donetsk	6	3	0	3	11	7	+4	9	Transfer to UEFA Cup
4	(Switzerland) Basel	6	0	1	5	2	16	−14	1	

Source: RSSSF

16 September 2008 1	Basel (Switzerland)	1–2	(Ukraine) Shakhtar Donetsk	Basel, Switzerland
21:45 EEST (UTC+3)	Zanni (yellow card) 37'; Abraham 90+3'	Report	Fernandinho 25'; Hübschman (yellow card) 33'; Shevchuk (yellow card) 41'; Jádson 45+1'; Brandão (yellow card) 90+4'	Stadium: St. Jakob-Park; Attendance: 34,820; Referee: Terje Hauge (Norway)

1 October 2008 2	Shakhtar Donetsk (Ukraine)	1–2	(Spain) Barcelona	Donetsk, Ukraine
21:45 EEST (UTC+3)	Ilsinho 45'; Srna (yellow card) 47'; Fernandinho (yellow card) 58'; Chyhrynskyi (yellow card) 69'; Brandão (yellow card) 88'	Report	Xavi (yellow card) 41'; Keita (yellow card) 78'; Messi 87', 90+4'; Márquez (yellow card) 88'; Iniesta (yellow card) 90+3'	Stadium: RSC Olimpiyskiy; Attendance: 25,300; Referee: Howard Webb (England)

22 October 2008 3	Shakhtar Donetsk (Ukraine)	0–1	(Portugal) Sporting CP	Donetsk, Ukraine
21:45 EEST (UTC+3)	Srna (yellow card) 82'	Report	Liédson 76'; Patrício (yellow card) 85'	Stadium: RSC Olimpiyskiy; Attendance: 23,120; Referee: Herbert Fandel (Germany)

4 November 2008 4	Sporting CP (Portugal)	1–0	(Ukraine) Shakhtar Donetsk	Lisbon, Portugal
22:45 EET (UTC+2)	Moutinho (yellow card) 21'; Postiga (yellow card) 41'; Derlei 73'	Report	Hübschman (yellow card) 24'; Chyhrynskyi (yellow card) 54'; Jádson (yellow card) 63'; Brandão (yellow card) 77'; Kucher (yellow card) 90+1'	Stadium: Estádio José Alvalade; Attendance: 24,282; Referee: Alain Hamer (Luxembourg)

26 November 2008 5	Shakhtar Donetsk (Ukraine)	5–0	(Switzerland) Basel	Donetsk, Ukraine
20:45 EET (UTC+2)	Jádson 32', 65', 72'; Willian 50'; Seleznyov 75'	Report	Stocker (yellow card) 87'	Stadium: RSC Olimpiyskiy; Attendance: 14,000; Referee: Kristinn Jakobsson (Iceland)

9 December 2008 6	Barcelona (Spain)	2–3	(Ukraine) Shakhtar Donetsk	Barcelona, Spain
20:45 EET (UTC+2)	Krkić (yellow card) 50'; Sylvinho 59'; Busquets 83'	Report	Hladkyy 31', 58' (yellow card) 87'; Hübschman (yellow card) 65'; Fernandinho 76'; Brandão (yellow card) 86'; Luiz Adriano (yellow card) 87'; Kucher (yellow card) 89'; Pyatov (yellow card) 90+1'	Stadium: Camp Nou; Attendance: 22,763; Referee: Mike Riley (England)

=== UEFA Cup ===
==== Knockout stage ====
19 February 2009 Round of 32 1st leg	Shakhtar Donetsk (Ukraine)	2–0	(England) Tottenham Hotspur	Donetsk, Ukraine
20:45 EET (UTC+2)	Raț (yellow card) 40'; Seleznyov 79'; Jádson 88'	Report		Stadium: RSC Olimpiyskiy; Attendance: 25,000; Referee: Thomas Einwaller (Austria)

26 February 2009 Round of 32 2nd leg	Tottenham Hotspur (England)	1–1 (1–3 agg.)	(Ukraine) Shakhtar Donetsk	London, England
22:00 EET (UTC+2)	O'Hara (yellow card) 28'; Dos Santos 55'; Palacios (yellow card) 90+1'	Report	Lewandowski (yellow card) 17'; Hübschman (yellow card) 50'; Fernandinho 86'	Stadium: White Hart Lane; Attendance: 30,595; Referee: Paolo Tagliavento (Italy)

12 March 2009 Round of 16 1st leg	CSKA Moscow (Russia)	1–0	(Ukraine) Shakhtar Donetsk	Moscow, Russia
19:00 EET (UTC+2)	Vágner Love (yellow card) 38' (goal) 50' (pen.); Mamayev (yellow card) 63'; Zhirkov (yellow card) 66'	Report	Chyhrynskyi (yellow card) 18'; Fernandinho (yellow card) 26'; Ishchenko (yellow card) 36'	Stadium: Luzhniki Stadium; Attendance: 19,700; Referee: Nicola Rizzoli (Italy)

19 March 2009 Round of 16 2nd leg	Shakhtar Donetsk (Ukraine)	2–0 (2–1 agg.)	(Russia) CSKA Moscow	Donetsk, Ukraine
19:30 EET (UTC+2)	Ishchenko (yellow card) 20'; Fernandinho 54' (pen.); Luiz Adriano 70'; Seleznyov (yellow card) 90'	Report	Akinfeev (yellow card) 42'; V.Berezutski (yellow card) 79'; Ryzhov (yellow card) 90'	Stadium: RSC Olimpiyskiy; Attendance: 25,000; Referee: Björn Kuipers (Netherlands)

9 April 2009 Quarterfinal 1st leg	Shakhtar Donetsk (Ukraine)	2–0	(France) Marseille	Donetsk, Ukraine
19:30 EEST (UTC+3)	Hübschman 39'; Jádson 65'; Ishchenko (yellow card) 82'	Report	M'bami (yellow card) 27'	Stadium: RSC Olimpiyskiy; Attendance: 25,500; Referee: Felix Brych (Germany)

16 April 2009 Quarterfinal 2nd leg	Marseille (France)	1–2 (1–4 agg.)	(Ukraine) Shakhtar Donetsk	Marseille, France
21:45 EEST (UTC+3)	Cana (yellow card) 21'; Ben Arfa 43'; Cheyrou (yellow card) 69'; Niang (yellow card) 85'	Report	Fernandinho 30'; Luiz Adriano (yellow card) 54' (goal) 90+3'; Willian (yellow card) 70'	Stadium: Stade Vélodrome; Attendance: 48,268; Referee: Manuel Mejuto González (Spain)

30 April 2009 Semifinal 1st leg	Dynamo Kyiv (Ukraine)	1–1	(Ukraine) Shakhtar Donetsk	Kyiv, Ukraine
19:30 EEST (UTC+3)	Chyhrynskyi 22' (o.g.); Vukojević (yellow card) 42'; Corrêa (yellow card) 82'	Report	Kucher (yellow card) 65'; Fernandinho 68'	Stadium: Lobanovsky Dynamo Stadium; Attendance: 17,000; Referee: Konrad Plautz (Austria)

7 May 2009 Semifinal 2nd leg	Shakhtar Donetsk (Ukraine)	2–1 (3–2 agg.)	(Ukraine) Dynamo Kyiv	Donetsk, Ukraine
19:30 EEST (UTC+3)	Jádson 17'; Hübschman (yellow card) 68'; Ilsinho 89'; Hladkyy (yellow card) 90+3'	Report	El Kaddouri (yellow card) 23'; Aliyev (yellow card) 38'; Bangoura (yellow card) 38' (goal) 47'; Vukojević (yellow card) 45+1'	Stadium: RSC Olimpiyskiy; Attendance: 24,300; Referee: Olegário Benquerença (Portugal)

==== Final ====
20 May 2009	Shakhtar Donetsk (Ukraine)	2–1 (a.e.t.)	(Germany) Werder Bremen	Istanbul, Turkey
21:45 EEST (UTC+3)	Luiz Adriano 25'; Srna (yellow card) 57'; Lewandowski (yellow card) 77'; Ilsinho (yellow card) 87'; Jádson 97'	Report	Naldo 35'; Frings (yellow card) 45+1'; Fritz (yellow card) 82'; Tziolis (yellow card) 115'; Boenisch (yellow card) 120+2'	Stadium: Şükrü Saracoğlu Stadium; Attendance: 37,357; Referee: Luis Medina Cantalejo (Spain)

== Squad statistics ==
As of match played 31 May 2009

=== Appearances and goals ===
No.	Pos	Nat	Player	Total		Premier League		Ukrainian Cup		Supercup		UEFA Champions League		UEFA Cup	
No.	Pos	Nat	Player	Apps	Goals	Apps	Goals	Apps	Goals	Apps	Goals	Apps	Goals	Apps	Goals
1	GK	(Ukraine) UKR	Bohdan Shust	1	0	0	0	0+1	0	0	0	0	0	0	0
3	DF	(Czech Republic) CZE	Tomáš Hübschman	40	2	19+3	1	3	0	1	0	8	0	5+1	1
4	DF	(Serbia) SRB	Igor Duljaj	26	1	9+4	1	1+1	0	1	0	3+2	0	4+1	0
5	DF	(Ukraine) UKR	Oleksandr Kucher	29	0	15	0	2	0	1	0	7	0	4	0
7	MF	(Brazil) BRA	Fernandinho	42	11	19+2	5	3	0	1	0	8	2	9	4
8	MF	(Brazil) BRA	Jádson	46	12	22+4	2	3	1	0+1	0	6+1	5	9	4
9	FW	(Mexico) MEX	Nery Castillo	4	1	2+2	1	0	0	0	0	0	0	0	0
10	FW	(Ukraine) UKR	Yevhen Seleznyov	35	10	14+12	6	2+1	2	1	0	0+3	1	0+2	1
11	MF	(Brazil) BRA	Ilsinho	27	4	7+6	1	2	1	1	0	2	1	8+1	1
12	GK	(Ukraine) UKR	Rustam Khudzhamov	9	0	6	0	2	0	1	0	0	0	0	0
13	DF	(Ukraine) UKR	Vyacheslav Shevchuk	20	0	14	0	2	0	0	0	3	0	1	0
17	FW	(Brazil) BRA	Luiz Adriano	29	9	9+3	4	3	1	0	0	4+2	1	7+1	3
18	MF	(Poland) POL	Mariusz Lewandowski	30	2	12+4	1	2+2	1	0	0	0+2	0	4+4	0
19	MF	(Ukraine) UKR	Oleksiy Gai	31	2	10+7	2	4+1	0	0	0	2+1	0	2+4	0
21	FW	(Ukraine) UKR	Oleksandr Hladkyi	41	8	11+14	5	2+3	1	0+1	0	2+1	2	3+4	0
22	MF	(Brazil) BRA	Willian	52	8	21+8	5	3+2	1	1	0	5+3	2	3+6	0
23	MF	(Ukraine) UKR	Kostyantyn Kravchenko	8	0	3+3	0	1+1	0	0	0	0	0	0	0
24	FW	(Ukraine) UKR	Ruslan Fomin	2	0	1+1	0	0	0	0	0	0	0	0	0
26	DF	(Romania) ROU	Răzvan Raț	32	1	16+1	0	2	1	0	0	5	0	8	0
27	DF	(Ukraine) UKR	Dmytro Chyhrynskyi	37	2	23	1	3	0	1	1	2	0	8	0
28	DF	(Ukraine) UKR	Oleksiy Polyanskyi	3	0	1+2	0	0	0	0	0	0	0	0	0
30	GK	(Ukraine) UKR	Andriy Pyatov	43	0	24	0	3	0	0	0	7	0	9	0
32	DF	(Ukraine) UKR	Mykola Ishchenko	27	0	11+2	0	3	0	1	0	2+2	0	6	0
33	DF	(Croatia) CRO	Darijo Srna	45	5	25	4	1+1	0	1	0	8	1	9	0
36	DF	(Ukraine) UKR	Oleksandr Chyzhov	9	0	8+1	0	0	0	0	0	0	0	0	0
44	DF	(Ukraine) UKR	Artem Fedetskyi	9	1	2+3	1	3	0	0	0	0+1	0	0	0
55	DF	(Ukraine) UKR	Volodymyr Yezerskiy	12	0	8	0	3	0	0	0	0+1	0	0	0
99	FW	(Bolivia) BOL	Marcelo Moreno	21	3	9+5	2	1	1	0	0	2+2	0	0+2	0
Players away on loan:
Players who left Shakhtar Donetsk during the season:
25	FW	(Brazil) BRA	Brandão	21	6	9+3	5	1	0	0+1	0	5+2	1	0	0

=== Goalscorers ===
Place	Position	Nation	Number	Name	Premier League	Ukrainian Cup	Super Cup	UEFA Champions League	UEFA Cup	Total
1	MF	(Brazil)	7	Fernandinho	5	0	0	2	4	12
1	MF	(Brazil)	8	Jádson	2	1	0	5	4	12
3	FW	(Ukraine)	10	Yevhen Seleznyov	6	2	0	1	1	10
4	FW	(Brazil)	17	Luiz Adriano	4	1	0	1	3	9
5	MF	(Brazil)	22	Willian	5	1	0	2	0	8
5	FW	(Ukraine)	21	Oleksandr Hladkyi	5	1	0	2	0	8
7	FW	(Brazil)	25	Brandão	5	0	0	1	0	6
8	DF	(Croatia)	33	Darijo Srna	4	0	0	1	0	5
9	MF	(Brazil)	11	Ilsinho	1	1	0	1	1	4
10	FW	(Bolivia)	99	Marcelo Moreno	2	1	0	0	0	3
11	MF	(Ukraine)	19	Oleksiy Gai	2	0	0	0	0	2
11	MF	(Poland)	18	Mariusz Lewandowski	1	1	0	0	0	2
11	DF	(Ukraine)	27	Dmytro Chyhrynskyi	1	0	1	0	0	2
11	DF	(Czech Republic)	3	Tomáš Hübschman	1	0	0	0	1	2
15	DF	(Serbia)	4	Igor Duljaj	1	0	0	0	0	1
15	DF	(Ukraine)	44	Artem Fedetskyi	1	0	0	0	0	1
15	FW	(Mexico)	9	Nery Castillo	1	0	0	0	0	1
15	DF	(Romania)	26	Răzvan Raț	0	1	0	0	0	1
TOTALS					47	10	1	16	14	88

=== Clean sheets ===
Place	Position	Nation	Number	Name	Premier League	Ukrainian Cup	Super Cup	UEFA Champions League	UEFA Cup	Total
1	GK	(Ukraine)	30	Andriy Pyatov	15	2	0	2	3	22
2	GK	(Ukraine)	12	Rustam Khudzhamov	3	0	0	0	0	3
TOTALS					18	2	0	2	3	25

=== Disciplinary record ===
Number	Nation	Position	Name	Premier League		Ukrainian Cup		Super Cup		Champions League		UEFA Cup		Total	
Number	Nation	Position	Name	Booked	Sent off (straight red)	Booked	Sent off (straight red)	Booked	Sent off (straight red)	Booked	Sent off (straight red)	Booked	Sent off (straight red)	Booked	Sent off (straight red)
3	(Czech Republic)	DF	Tomáš Hübschman	2	0	0	0	0	0	4	0	2	0	8	0
4	(Serbia)	DF	Igor Duljaj	1	0	0	0	0	0	0	0	0	0	1	0
5	(Ukraine)	DF	Oleksandr Kucher	1	0	0	0	0	0	2	0	1	0	4	0
7	(Brazil)	MF	Fernandinho	4	1	0	1	0	0	1	0	1	0	6	2
8	(Brazil)	MF	Jádson	3	1	0	0	0	0	2	0	0	0	5	1
10	(Ukraine)	FW	Yevhen Seleznyov	3	0	0	0	0	0	0	0	1	0	4	0
11	(Brazil)	MF	Ilsinho	2	0	1	0	0	0	0	0	1	0	4	0
13	(Ukraine)	DF	Vyacheslav Shevchuk	0	0	0	0	0	0	1	0	0	0	1	0
17	(Brazil)	FW	Luiz Adriano	2	0	0	0	0	0	1	0	1	0	4	0
18	(Poland)	DF	Mariusz Lewandowski	0	0	0	0	0	0	0	0	2	0	2	0
19	(Ukraine)	MF	Oleksiy Gai	0	0	1	0	0	0	0	0	0	0	1	0
21	(Ukraine)	FW	Oleksandr Hladkyi	2	0	0	0	0	0	2	0	1	0	5	0
22	(Brazil)	MF	Willian	1	0	0	0	0	0	0	0	1	0	2	0
26	(Romania)	DF	Răzvan Raț	0	0	0	0	0	0	0	0	1	0	1	0
27	(Ukraine)	DF	Dmytro Chyhrynskyi	4	0	0	0	0	0	2	0	1	0	7	0
30	(Ukraine)	GK	Andriy Pyatov	0	0	1	0	0	0	1	0	0	0	2	0
32	(Ukraine)	DF	Mykola Ishchenko	1	0	1	0	0	0	0	0	3	0	5	0
33	(Croatia)	DF	Darijo Srna	5	0	0	0	1	0	2	0	1	0	9	0
36	(Ukraine)	DF	Oleksandr Chyzhov	1	0	0	0	0	0	0	0	0	0	1	0
44	(Ukraine)	DF	Artem Fedetskyi	3	0	1	0	0	0	0	0	0	0	4	0
99	(Bolivia)	FW	Marcelo Moreno	0	0	1	0	0	0	0	0	0	0	1	0
Players away on loan:
Players who left Shakhtar Donetsk during the season:
25	(Brazil)	FW	Brandão	6	1	0	0	0	0	4	0	0	0	10	1
			TOTALS	41	3	6	1	1	0	22	0	17	0	87	4
