= 2007 Ukrainian Super Cup =

Dynamo Kyiv	Shakhtar Donetsk
2	2
- Dynamo Kyiv won 4–2 on penalties
- Date: 10 July 2007
- Venue: Central Stadium "Chornomorets", Odesa

The 2007 Ukrainian Super Cup became the fourth edition of Ukrainian Super Cup, an annual football match contested by the winners of the previous season's Ukrainian Top League and Ukrainian Cup competitions. Dynamo Kyiv had won both competitions.

The match was played at the Central Stadium "Chornomorets", Odesa, on 10 July 2007, and contested by league winner Dynamo Kyiv and cup runner-up Shakhtar Donetsk. Dynamo won it 4–2 on penalties.

== Match ==
=== Details ===
10 July 2007

Dynamo Kyiv	2–2	Shakhtar Donetsk
Mykhalyk 26', 30'	Report	14' Gladkiy; 55' Tkachenko
Penalties
Aliyev (penalty missed); Ninković (penalty scored); Dedechko (penalty scored); Marković (penalty scored); Morozyuk (penalty scored)	4–2	(penalty missed) Brandão; (penalty scored) Fernandinho; (penalty missed) Jádson; (penalty scored) Raț

Central Stadium "Chornomorets", Odesa
Attendance: 32,000
Referee: Pieter Vink (Netherlands)

Dynamo Kyiv	Shakhtar Donetsk

G	(Ukraine) Oleksandr Rybka
D	(Serbia) Marjan Marković
D	(Serbia) Goran Gavrančić (c)
D	(Ukraine) Vitaliy Mandzyuk
D	(Ukraine) Vitaliy Fedoriv
M	(Ukraine) Denys Dedechko	(yellow card) 34'
M	(Ukraine) Taras Mykhalyk
M	(Ukraine) Mykola Morozyuk
M	(Ukraine) Oleksandr Aliyev
M	(Ukraine) Denys Oliynyk		(substituted off) 56'
A	(Ukraine) Volodymyr Lysenko		(substituted off) 78'
Substitutes :
G	(Ukraine) Taras Lutsenko
D	(Ukraine) Kyrylo Petrov
M	(Serbia) Miloš Ninković		(substituted on) 56'
A	(Hungary) Balázs Farkas
A	(Croatia) Tomislav Bušić
A	(Ukraine) Artem Kravets
A	(Belarus) Andrey Varankow		(substituted on) 78'
Manager :
(Ukraine) Anatolii Demianenko

G	(Ukraine) Andriy Pyatov
D	(Ukraine) Serhiy Tkachenko
D	(Ukraine) Dmytro Chyhrynskyi (c)	(yellow card) 23'
D	(Ukraine) Volodymyr Yezerskiy	(yellow card) 69'
D	(Romania) Răzvan Raț
M	(Ukraine) Oleksiy Polyanskiy	(yellow card) 20'
M	(Ukraine) Volodymyr Pryyomov		(substituted off) 46'
M	(Brazil) Fernandinho
M	(Serbia) Zvonimir Vukić
A	(Ukraine) Oleksandr Gladkiy		(substituted off) 24'
A	(Brazil) Brandão
Substitutes :
G	(Ukraine) Dmytro Shutkov
D	(Czech Republic) Tomáš Hübschman
M	(Serbia) Igor Duljaj		(substituted on) 46', (substituted off) 63'
M	(Brazil) Jádson		(substituted on) 24'
M	(Poland) Mariusz Lewandowski
M	(Ukraine) Oleksiy Gai		(substituted on) 63'
A	(Romania) Ciprian Marica
Manager :
(Romania) Mircea Lucescu
