= 2012–13 FC Kryvbas Kryvyi Rih season =

Kryvbas Kryvyi Rih
2012-13 season
- Chairman: (Ukraine) Oleksandr Livshyts
- Manager: (Ukraine) Oleh Taran
- Stadium: Metalurh Stadium
- Premier League: 11th
- Ukrainian Cup: Round of 32
- Top goalscorer: League: 2 players (3); All: Sergei Samodin (4)

The Kryvbas 2012–13 season was Kryvbas's 21st Ukrainian Premier League season, and their second season under manager Oleh Taran. During the season, Kryvbas competed in the Ukrainian Premier League and Ukrainian Cup.

== Squad ==
Squad is given according to the Ukrainian Premier League website and club's Official website as of September 1, 2012. Note: Flags indicate national team as defined under FIFA eligibility rules; some limited exceptions apply. Players may hold more than one non-FIFA nationality.

No.	Pos.	Nation	Player
1	GK	UKR	Vitaliy Reva
3	DF	UKR	Vyacheslav Serdyuk
4	DF	UKR	Bohdan Shershun (on loan from Arsenal)
5	MF	UKR	Vitaliy Fedoriv
7	MF	UKR	Valeriy Fedorchuk (on loan from Dnipro)
8	FW	RUS	Sergei Samodin
9	FW	CZE	Jiří Jeslínek
11	MF	CRO	Mladen Bartulović (on loan from Dnipro)
15	MF	UKR	Denys Dedechko
17	MF	NGR	Michel Babatunde
18	MF	UKR	Kyrylo Petrov (on loan from Dynamo)
22	DF	UKR	Vitaliy Lysytskyi (Captain)

No.	Pos.	Nation	Player
23	DF	GEO	Ucha Lobjanidze (on loan from Dnipro)
24	DF	UKR	Pavlo Pashayev (on loan from Dnipro)
27	DF	UKR	Artem Bobukh
28	MF	SLO	Darijan Matić
33	MF	CRO	Antonio Jakoliš
39	MF	UKR	Dmytro Lyopa (on loan from Dnipro)
47	DF	MNE	Saša Balić
55	GK	UKR	Artem Shtanko
77	FW	UKR	Oleksandr Ivashchenko
86	FW	UKR	Oleksiy Antonov (on loan from Dnipro)
88	MF	UKR	Rinar Valeyev
91	GK	UKR	Ihor Ivanenko

=== Out on loan ===
Note: Flags indicate national team as defined under FIFA eligibility rules; some limited exceptions apply. Players may hold more than one non-FIFA nationality.

No.	Pos.	Nation	Player
12	GK	UKR	Denys Rylskyi (on loan to Naftovyk-Ukrnafta)
21	GK	UKR	Yevhen Deyneko (on loan to Zirka Kirovohrad)
30	MF	UKR	Vyacheslav Ryabov (on loan to Hirnyk Kryvyi Rih)

No.	Pos.	Nation	Player
32	MF	UKR	Vladyslav Sukhorukov (on loan to Hirnyk Kryvyi Rih)
59	FW	UKR	Serhiy Motuz (on loan to Naftovyk-Ukrnafta)

== Competitions ==
=== 2012-13 Ukrainian Premier League ===
==== Results summary ====
Overall								Home						Away					
Pld	W	D	L	GF	GA	GD	Pts	W	D	L	GF	GA	GD	W	D	L	GF	GA	GD
11	4	1	6	12	15	−3	13	2	1	2	7	3	+4	2	0	4	5	12	−7

Last updated: 25 August 2012.
Source: Soccerway

==== Results by round ====
Round	1	2	3	4	5	6	7	8	9	10	11	12	13	14	15	16	17	18	19	20	21	22	23	24	25	26	27	28	29	30
Ground	A	H	A	H	A	H	A	H	A	H	A	H																		
Result	W	W	L	L	W	D	L	L	L	W	L																			
Position	7	6	7	8	5	6	7	10	11	9	11																			

Source: Soccerway
A = Away; H = Home; W = Win; D = Draw; L = Loss

==== Results ====
15 July 2012 Match 1	Vorskla	0 – 1	Kryvbas	Poltava
17:00	Dolhanskyi (red card) 85'	Summary	Antonov 88'	Stadium: Vorskla Stadium; Attendance: 5,500; Referee: Serhiy Dankovskyi

20 July 2012 Match 2	Kryvbas	1 – 0	Chornomorets	Kryvyi Rih
19:00	Kankava 25'	Summary		Stadium: Metalurh Stadium; Attendance: 3,890; Referee: Yuri Moseichuk

29 July 2012 Match 3	Shakhtar	1 – 0	Kryvbas	Donetsk
19:00	Kucher (red card) 15'; Fernandinho 90+3'	Summary	Lysytskyi (yellow card) 36' (yellow-red card) 49'; Bartulović (yellow card) 19' (yellow-red card) 62'	Stadium: Donbass Arena; Attendance: 38,756; Referee: Serhiy Boiko

3 August 2012 Match 4	Kryvbas	0 – 1	Dynamo	Kryvyi Rih
19:00		Summary	Yarmolenko 86'	Stadium: Metalurh Stadium; Attendance: 7,800; Referee: Anatoliy Abdula

11 August 2012 Match 5	Zorya	0 – 1	Kryvbas	Luhansk
19:30		Summary	Bartulović 18'	Stadium: Avanhard Stadium; Attendance: 13,985; Referee: Kostiantyn Trukhanov

18 August 2012 Match 6	Kryvbas	0 – 0	Dnipro	Kryvyi Rih
17:30		Summary	Mazuch (yellow card) 18' (yellow-red card) 88'	Stadium: Metalurh Stadium; Attendance: 4,925; Referee: Yevhen Aranovskiy

26 August 2012 Match 7	Metalist	3 – 1	Kryvbas	Kharkiv
19:30	Xavier 14' (pen.); Marlos 50'; Edmar 53'	Summary	Kankava 81'	Stadium: Metalist Stadium; Attendance: 30,115; Referee: Vitaliy Hodulian

1 September 2012 Match 8	Kryvbas	1 – 2	Illichivets	Kryvyi Rih
15:30	Bartulović 51'	Summary	Kravchenko 48'; Targamadze 50'	Stadium: Metalurh Stadium; Attendance: 3,050; Referee: Dmytro Kutakov

16 September 2012 Match 9	Tavriya	2 – 0	Kryvbas	Simferopol
19:00	Shynder 11'; Nazarenko 14'	Summary		Stadium: RSC Lokomotiv; Attendance: 5,600; Referee: Serhiy Dankovskyi

30 September 2012 Match 10	Kryvbas	5 – 0	Metalurh Zaporizhya	Kryvyi Rih
17:30	Samodin 5', 46'; Lyopa 59'; Valeyev 64'; Antonov 90'	Summary		Stadium: Metalurh Stadium; Attendance: 2,500; Referee: Yuri Hrysio

5 October 2012 Match 11	Metalurh Donetsk	6 – 2	Kryvbas	Donetsk
19:00	Holaydo 37'; Volovyk 40' (pen.); Traoré 44', 62', 90+1'; Danilo 55'	Summary	Antonov 52' (pen.); Samodin 54'	Stadium: Metalurh Stadium; Attendance: 2,500; Referee: Kostiantyn Trukhanov

21 October 2012 Match 12	Kryvbas	v	Arsenal	Kryvyi Rih
15:30		[ Summary]		Stadium: Metalurh Stadium

==== League table ====
Pos	Team	Pld	W	D	L	GF	GA	GD	Pts	Qualification or relegation
5	Metalurh Donetsk	30	14	7	9	45	35	+10	49	Qualification for the Europa League third qualifying round
6	Chornomorets Odesa	30	12	7	11	32	36	−4	43	Qualification for the Europa League second qualifying round
7	Kryvbas Kryvyi Rih (D)	30	12	7	11	36	41	−5	43	Club expelled after season (Note: Kryvbas Kryvyi Rih were denied a license for the 2013–14 season due to financial problems and were expelled.)
8	Arsenal Kyiv	30	10	9	11	34	41	−7	39	
9	Illichivets Mariupol	30	10	8	12	30	32	−2	38	

Source: uafootball.net.ua
Rules for classification: 1st points; 2nd goal difference; 3rd goals scored; 4th head-to-head points; 5th head-to-head goal difference; 6th head-to-head goals scored; 7th fair play; 8th draw (Regulation, p.52-53).
(D) Disqualified

=== 2012–13 Ukrainian Cup Results ===
23 September 2012 Round of 32	FC Sevastopol	2 – 1	Kryvbas	Sevastopol
18:00	Kuznetsov 45+2'; Karavayev 72'	Summary	Samodin 60'; Petrov (yellow card) 34' (yellow-red card) 75'	Stadium: SC Sevastopol; Attendance: 5,563; Referee: Yaroslav Kozyk

== Squad statistics ==
=== Goal scorers ===
As of 6 October 2012

Place	Position	Nation	Number	Name	Premier League	Ukrainian Cup	Total
1	FW	(Russia)	8	Sergei Samodin	3	1	4
2	FW	(Ukraine)	86	Oleksiy Antonov	3	0	3
3	MF	(Croatia)	11	Mladen Bartulović	2	0	2
3	MF	(Georgia (country))	20	Jaba Kankava	2	0	2
5	MF	(Ukraine)	39	Dmytro Lyopa	1	0	1
5	MF	(Ukraine)	88	Rinar Valeyev	1	0	1
				TOTALS	12	1	13

=== Appearances and goals ===
As of 6 October 2012

No.	Pos	Nat	Player	Total		Premier League		Ukrainian Cup	
No.	Pos	Nat	Player	Apps	Goals	Apps	Goals	Apps	Goals
1	GK	(Ukraine) UKR	Vitaliy Reva	1	0	1	0	0	0
3	DF	(Ukraine) UKR	Vyacheslav Serdyuk	5	0	3+1	0	1	0
4	DF	(Ukraine) UKR	Bohdan Shershun	9	0	8	0	1	0
5	MF	(Ukraine) UKR	Vitaliy Fedoriv	6	0	6	0	0	0
8	FW	(Russia) RUS	Sergei Samodin	10	4	8+1	3	1	1
9	FW	(Czech Republic) CZE	Jiří Jeslínek	10	0	4+5	0	0+1	0
11	MF	(Croatia) CRO	Mladen Bartulović	10	2	9	2	1	0
15	MF	(Ukraine) UKR	Denys Dedechko	11	0	8+2	0	1	0
17	MF	(Nigeria) NGR	Michel Babatunde	5	0	1+3	0	0+1	0
18	MF	(Ukraine) UKR	Kyrylo Petrov	11	0	9+1	0	1	0
22	DF	(Ukraine) UKR	Vitaliy Lysytskyi	9	0	7+1	0	1	0
23	DF	(Georgia (country)) GEO	Ucha Lobjanidze	10	0	9	0	0+1	0
24	DF	(Ukraine) UKR	Pavlo Pashayev	8	0	7	0	1	0
28	MF	(Slovenia) SLO	Darijan Matić	6	0	4+2	0	0	0
33	MF	(Croatia) CRO	Antonio Jakoliš	3	0	1+2	0	0	0
39	MF	(Ukraine) UKR	Dmytro Lyopa	5	1	3+2	1	0	0
47	DF	(Montenegro) MNE	Saša Balić	5	0	1+4	0	0	0
55	GK	(Ukraine) UKR	Artem Shtanko	11	0	10	0	1	0
86	FW	(Ukraine) UKR	Oleksiy Antonov	10	3	4+5	3	1	0
88	MF	(Ukraine) UKR	Rinar Valeyev	12	1	11	1	1	0
Players who appeared for Volyn who left the club during the season:
20	MF	(Georgia (country)) GEO	Jaba Kankava	7	2	7	2	0	0

=== Disciplinary record ===
Number	Nation	Position	Name	Premier League		Ukrainian Cup		Total	
Number	Nation	Position	Name	Yellow card	Red card	Yellow card	Red card	Yellow card	Red card
3	(Ukraine)	DF	Vyacheslav Serdyuk	1	0	0	0	1	0
4	(Ukraine)	DF	Bohdan Shershun	3	0	0	0	3	0
5	(Ukraine)	MF	Vitaliy Fedoriv	1	0	0	0	1	0
8	(Russia)	FW	Sergei Samodin	1	0	0	0	1	0
9	(Czech Republic)	FW	Jiří Jeslínek	1	0	1	0	2	0
11	(Croatia)	MF	Mladen Bartulović	3	1	0	0	3	1
15	(Ukraine)	MF	Denys Dedechko	4	0	1	0	5	0
17	(Nigeria)	MF	Michel Babatunde	1	0	0	0	1	0
18	(Ukraine)	MF	Kyrylo Petrov	0	0	0	1	0	1
20	(Georgia (country))	MF	Jaba Kankava	1	0	0	0	1	0
22	(Ukraine)	DF	Vitaliy Lysytskyi	2	1	0	0	2	1
23	(Georgia (country))	DF	Ucha Lobjanidze	4	0	0	0	4	0
28	(Slovenia)	MF	Darijan Matić	1	0	0	0	1	0
39	(Ukraine)	MF	Dmytro Lyopa	2	0	0	0	2	0
47	(Montenegro)	DF	Saša Balić	1	0	0	0	1	0
55	(Ukraine)	GK	Artem Shtanko	1	0	0	0	1	0
86	(Ukraine)	FW	Oleksiy Antonov	1	0	1	0	2	0
88	(Ukraine)	MF	Rinar Valeyev	1	0	0	0	1	0
			TOTALS	29	2	3	1	32	3
