= Andrius Jokšas =

Lithuanian footballer

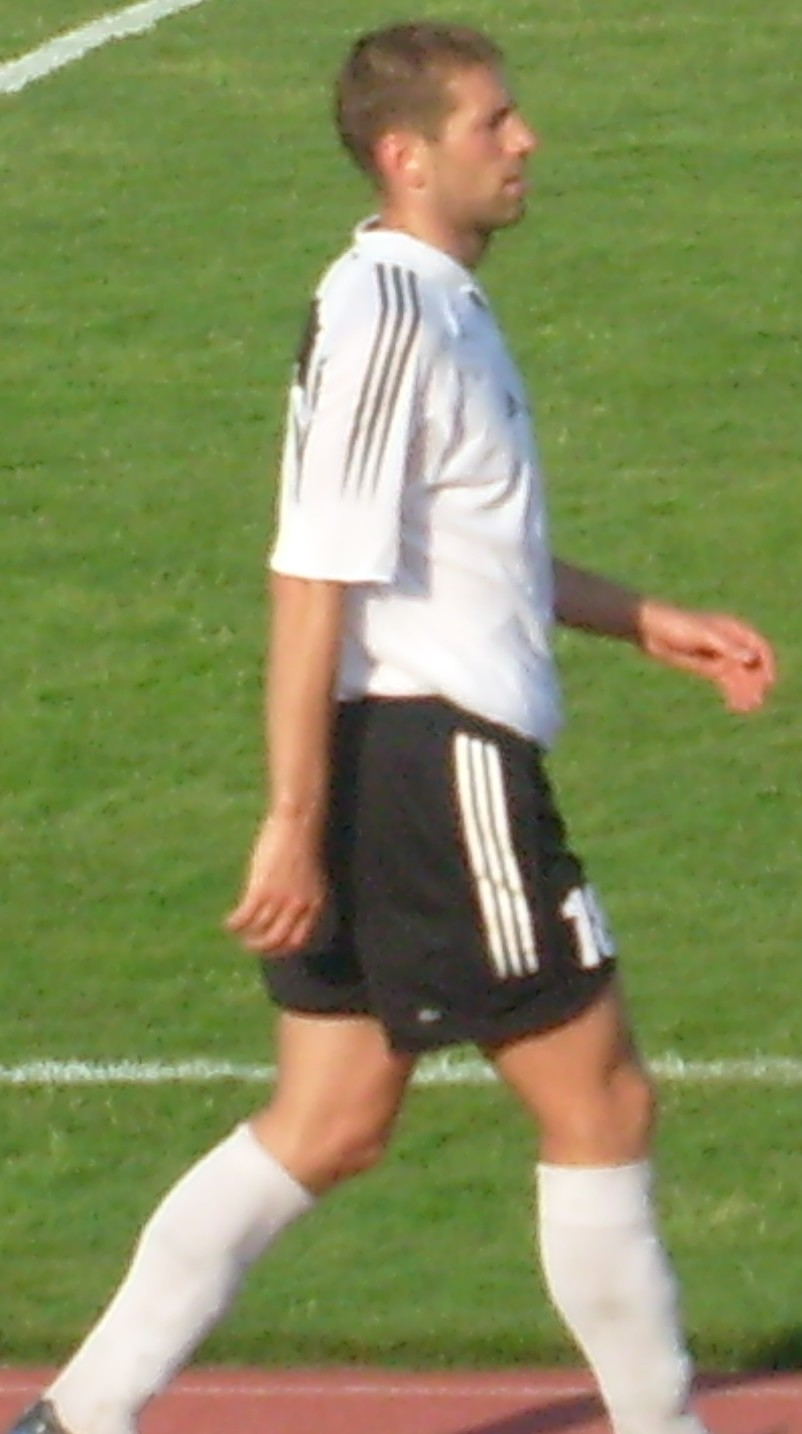

Personal information
- Full name: Andrius Jokšas
- Date of birth: 12 January 1979 (age 47)
- Place of birth: Vilnius, Lithuanian SSR, Soviet Union
- Height: 1.78 m (5 ft 10 in)
- Position: Defender

Senior career*
Years	Team	Apps	(Gls)
1994–1996	Banga Gargždai	12	(0)
1996–1999	Žalgiris Vilnius	46	(4)
1996–1997	→ Žalgiris-Volmeta Vilnius	13	(0)
1997–1998	→ Geležinis Vilkas Vilnius	14	(2)
2000	Kryvbas Kryvyi Rih	16	(1)
2000	→ Kryvbas-2 Kryvyi Rih	2	(1)
2000–2001	Krylia Sovetov Samara	14	(1)
2002	Arsenal Kyiv	8	(2)
2002	Žalgiris Vilnius	1	(0)
2003	Baltika Kaliningrad	7	(0)
2003	Fakel Voronezh	9	(0)
2004	Žalgiris Vilnius	7	(1)
2004	Vorskla Poltava	7	(0)
2005	Žalgiris Vilnius	27	(3)
2006–2009	Tavriya Simferopol	64	(4)
2010	Belshina Bobruisk	14	(1)
2010	Banga Gargždai	11	(0)
2011	Ekranas Panevėžys	24	(1)
2012	Banga Gargždai	28	(0)
2013–2016	Atlantas Klaipėda	84	(3)
2017–2018	Gargždų Pramogos SC	11	(0)

International career
1998–2009	Lithuania	17	(0)
- * Club domestic league appearances and goals

Andrius Jokšas (born 12 January 1979) is a retired Lithuanian football midfielder.
