= Vadym Panas =

Ukrainian footballer (born 1985)

Personal information
- Date of birth: 23 May 1985 (age 41)
- Place of birth: Novovolynsk, Ukrainian SSR
- Height: 1.77 m (5 ft 10 in)
- Position: Midfielder

Youth career
- 2000–2002: Volyn Lutsk

Senior career*
Years	Team	Apps	(Gls)
2002–2006	Volyn Lutsk	17	(0)
2002–2003	→ Kovel-Volyn-2 Kovel	24	(3)
2003	→ Ikva Mlyniv (loan)	1	(0)
2004	→ Polissya Zhytomyr (loan)	13	(1)
2005	→ Zorya Luhansk (loan)	9	(2)
2006	Karpaty Lviv	1	(0)
2006	→ Karpaty-2 Lviv	1	(0)
2007–2010	Lviv	89	(7)
2010–2012	Obolon Kyiv	48	(3)
2012–2013	Volyn Lutsk	0	(0)
2013	Naftan Novopolotsk	11	(0)
2014	Nyva Ternopil	9	(1)
2014	FC Laska Boratyn		
2015–2017	ODEK Orzhiv		
2018	FC Malynsk		
2018–2019	FC Votrans Lutsk		
- * Club domestic league appearances and goals

Vadym Panas (Ukrainian: Вадим Володимирович Панас; born 23 May 1985) is a Ukrainian former professional footballer who played as a midfielder.
