= Vitaliy Lysytskyi =

Ukrainian footballer (born 1982)

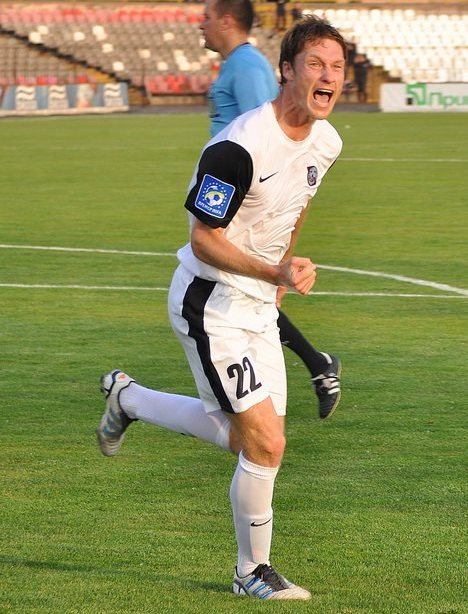

Personal information
- Full name: Vitaliy Serhiyovych Lysytskyi
- Date of birth: 16 April 1982 (age 44)
- Place of birth: Svitlovodsk, Ukrainian SSR
- Height: 1.87 m (6 ft 2 in)
- Position: Defender

Team information
- Current team: Kolos Kovalivka

Youth career
- 1997–1998: Dynamo Kyiv

Senior career*
Years	Team	Apps	(Gls)
1998–2001	Dynamo-3 Kyiv	29	(3)
1999–2003	Dynamo-2 Kyiv	70	(5)
2000–2002	Dynamo Kyiv	13	(2)
2003	Chornomorets Odesa	27	(2)
2004	Dnipro-2 Dnipropetrovsk	3	(1)
2004–2012	Dnipro Dnipropetrovsk	68	(4)
2007–2008	→ Kryvbas Kryvyi Rih (loan)	26	(2)
2010–2012	→ Kryvbas Kryvyi Rih (loan)	65	(0)
2012–2013	Kryvbas Kryvyi Rih	24	(1)
2013–2014	Hoverla Uzhhorod	27	(2)
2014–2015	Metalurh Zaporizhzhia	33	(3)
2016–2017	Kolos Kovalivka	35	(4)

International career
2003	Ukraine U21	1	(0)
2001–2002	Ukraine	5	(0)
Medal record
Men's football
Representing Ukraine
UEFA European Under-18 Championship
Runner-up	2000 Germany
- * Club domestic league appearances and goals

Vitaliy Serhiyovych Lysytskyi (Ukrainian: Віталій Сергійович Лисицький; born 16 April 1982) is a Ukrainian former professional footballer who played as a defender.

== Honours ==
Dynamo Kyiv

- Ukrainian Premier League: 2000
- Ukrainian Cup runner-up: 2002

Ukraine U19

- UEFA European Under-18 Football Championship runner-up: 2000
