= Vyacheslav Serdyuk =

Ukrainian footballer

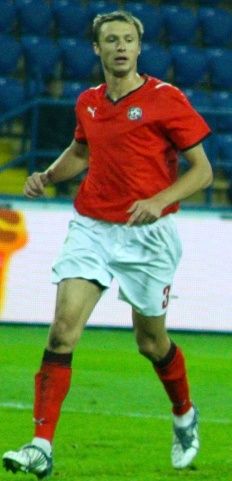

Personal information
- Full name: Vyacheslav Oleksandrovych Serdyuk
- Date of birth: 28 January 1985 (age 41)
- Place of birth: Shostka, Sumy Oblast, Ukrainian SSR, Soviet Union
- Height: 1.83 m (6 ft 0 in)
- Position: Defender

Youth career
- 1999–2002: RVUFK Kiev

Senior career*
| Years | Team | Apps | (Gls) |
| 2003–2004 | Moscow | 0 | (0) |
| 2004–2009 | Dnipro Dnipropetrovsk | 20 | (0) |
| 2007–2008 | → Naftovyk Okhtyrka (loan) | 23 | (1) |
| 2008 | → Kryvbas Kryvyi Rih (loan) | 16 | (0) |
| 2009 | → Kryvbas Kryvyi Rih (loan) | 26 | (0) |
| 2010–2013 | Kryvbas Kryvyi Rih | 61 | (1) |
| 2013 | Arsenal Kyiv | 3 | (0) |
| 2014 | Gomel | 29 | (0) |
| 2015 | Torpedo-BelAZ Zhodino | 19 | (1) |
- * Club domestic league appearances and goals as of 29 January 2016

Vyacheslav Oleksandrovych Serdyuk (Ukrainian: В'ячеслав Олександрович Сердюк; born 28 January 1985) is a Ukrainian former football defender.
