= Dmytro Chyhrynskyi =

Ukrainian footballer (born 1986)

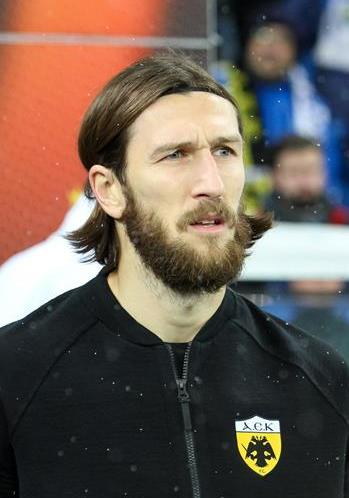
- Chyhrynskyi with AEK Athens in 2018

Personal information
- Full name: Dmytro Anatoliiovych Chyhrynskyi
- Date of birth: 7 November 1986 (age 40)
- Place of birth: Iziaslav, Ukrainian SSR, Soviet Union
- Height: 1.89 m (6 ft 2 in)
- Position: Centre-back

Team information
- Current team: Krasava Ypsonas (head coach)

Youth career
- 2000–2002: UFK Lviv

Senior career*
Years	Team	Apps	(Gls)
2002	Karpaty-3 Lviv	2	(0)
2002–2009	Shakhtar Donetsk	83	(7)
2002–2005	→ Shakhtar-2 Donetsk	43	(2)
2003	→ Shakhtar-3 Donetsk	8	(0)
2005–2006	→ Metalurh Zaporizhzhia (loan)	15	(2)
2009–2010	Barcelona	12	(0)
2010–2015	Shakhtar Donetsk	37	(4)
2015–2016	Dnipro Dnipropetrovsk	15	(1)
2016–2021	AEK Athens	83	(5)
2021–2023	Ionikos	53	(2)
2023	Shakhtar Donetsk	3	(0)

International career
2002	Ukraine U16	4	(1)
2002–2003	Ukraine U17	5	(0)
2003–2004	Ukraine U18	7	(0)
2004	Ukraine U19	4	(0)
2003–2006	Ukraine U21	16	(2)
2007–2011	Ukraine	29	(0)

Managerial career
- 2025–2026: Aris (assistant)
- 2026–: Krasava Ypsonas
Medal record
Men's football
Representing Ukraine
UEFA European Under-19 Championship
Bronze medal – third place	2004 Switzerland
UEFA European Under-21 Championship
Runner-up	2006
- * Club domestic league appearances and goals as of 2 October 2023

Dmytro Anatoliiovych Chyhrynskyi (Ukrainian: Дмитро Анатолійович Чигринський; born 7 November 1986) is a Ukrainian former professional footballer who played as a centre-back. He is currently the head coach of Cypriot First Division club Krasava Ypsonas.

He spent most of his professional career, from 2002 to 2015, in two spells with Shakhtar Donetsk. He won honours at the club including five Ukrainian Premier League titles, as many Ukrainian Cups, and the UEFA Cup in 2009. He spent the 2009–10 season with Barcelona in Spain, joining for €25 million, playing rarely and returning to Shakhtar for €15 million.

Chyhrynskyi represented the Ukraine national team from 2007 to 2011, making 29 appearances. He was in the nation's squad for the 2006 FIFA World Cup, but did not play due to injury.

== Early life ==
Chyhrynskyi was born in Iziaslav, Khmelnytskyi Oblast, Ukrainian SSR. He was a player in the UFK Lviv youth system before moving to Donetsk at the age of 14, completing his development at the Shakhtar Donetsk academy. He holds a master's degree in liberal arts.

== Club career ==
=== Shakhtar Donetsk ===
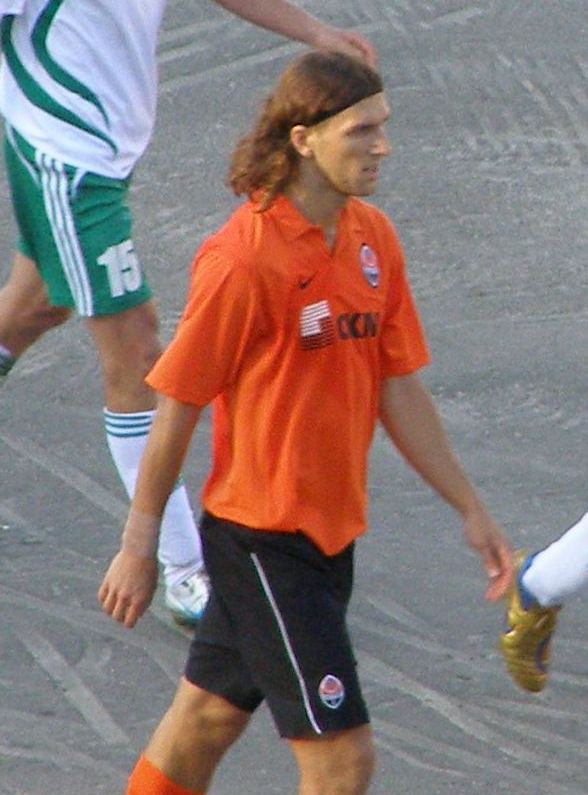
Chyhrynskyi playing for Shakhtar Donetsk in 2008

Chyhrynskyi earned his debut in the Vyshcha Liha in 2004, at the age of 17. In 2005, he was loaned out to Ukrainian club Metalurh Zaporizhzhia, where he experienced continuous top-flight football. After a successful stint at Metalurh, Dmytro was brought back to Donetsk. He quickly emerged as a consistent defender and a leading figure, and first experienced UEFA Champions League football when coming on as a substitute against Barcelona during the 2004–05 UEFA Champions League. The young player cemented a starting position at the team in the 2006–07 season, by the end of which, at the age of 20, he captained Shakhtar in the Ukrainian Cup final against Dynamo Kyiv in the absence of the regular captain, Matuzalém.

During the 2007–08 season, Chyhrynskyi was selected as the vice-captain of the team. During the season, he was voted man of the match in the 2–0 win over rivals Dynamo Kyiv in the Ukrainian Cup Final. Also in the same season, he won the Vyshcha Liha with Shakhtar.

At the beginning of the 2008–09 season, Chyhrynskyi helped the squad win the Ukrainian Super Cup. With Shakhtar, he played in the group stage of the UEFA Champions League, finishing third in the group behind Barcelona and Sporting CP. This was not the end of the club's European journey, however, as they parachuted down to the UEFA Cup. He helped the team make it to the quarter-final stage, defeating 1993 European Champions Marseille. They then progressed to the semi-finals, where they played Ukrainian rivals Dynamo Kyiv. Shakhtar progressed to the 2009 UEFA Cup Final against Werder Bremen – Chyhrynskyi and Shakhtar won the trophy 2–1 after extra time.

=== Barcelona ===
On 26 August 2009, after long negotiations between Shakhtar and Barcelona, a deal was reached for the transfer of Chyhrynskyi. The transfer was valued at around €25 million and included the clause that Chyhrynskyi play in the UEFA Super Cup for his former club, coincidentally against Barcelona. On 31 August 2009, Barcelona confirmed that Chyhrynskyi had passed a medical and signed for five years. Chyhrynskyi was the first Ukrainian player to ever play for Barcelona and was expected to display his ability with the ball at his feet and "aerial presence and strong defensive skills" .

Chyhrynskyi made his debut for Barcelona on 12 September 2009 in La Liga against Getafe. He played a full 90 minutes on his debut, a 2–0 victory.

Though Barcelona retained the title, Chyhrynskyi fared poorly in his debut season with the club. Despite this, manager Pep Guardiola had been keen to keep him.

=== Return to Shakhtar Donetsk ===
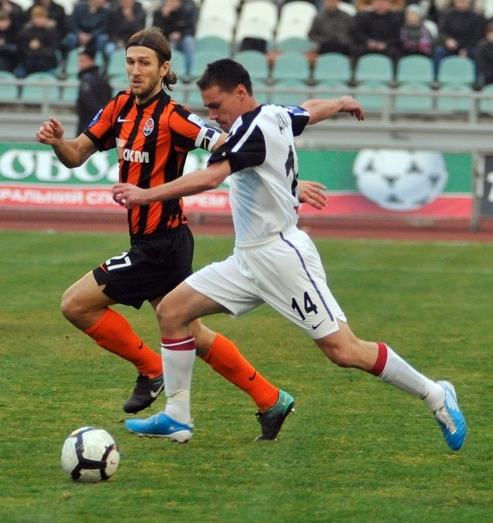
Chyhrynskyi (left) playing for Shakhtar Donetsk in 2010

On 6 July 2010, Chyhrynskyi signed a five-year deal to return to his former club Shakhtar Donetsk for a fee of €15 million, making Shakhtar a profit of €10 million. after spending just one season with the Spanish team, playing just 14 times. On 3 November 2010, Chyhrynskyi scored a header against Arsenal in the Champions League from a Jádson free-kick via a deflection off Craig Eastmond.

Chyhrynskyi left Shakhtar by mutual consent on 2 February 2015.

=== Dnipro ===
Seven days after leaving Shakhtar, Chyhrynskyi joined fellow league team Dnipro on a free transfer and signed a one-year contract.

=== AEK Athens ===
On 11 June 2016, Chyhrynskyi signed a two-year contract with a possible extension for a third with Super League Greece club AEK Athens. On 26 February 2017 he scored his first goal for the club in a 3–0 home win against AEL. The following 4 February, he scored in a 2–1 away win against champions Olympiacos, his first goal for the 2017–18 season.

In mid-April 2021, the Ukrainian defender was unsure about his future, as his contract was not likely to be renewed and he was strongly considering retiring and serving the team from another official post. On 15 June 2021, AEK Athens announced that Chyhrynskyi would not continue with the club.

=== Ionikos Nikaias ===
On 9 September 2021, Chyhrynskyi signed a one-year contract with the newly promoted Super League Greece club Ionikos. On 6 July 2022, he extended his contract with Ionikos for one more year.

=== Third spell at Shakhtar Donetsk ===
On 4 August 2023, Chyhrynskyi signed a one-year contract with the Ukrainian Premier League club Shakhtar Donetsk.

== International career ==
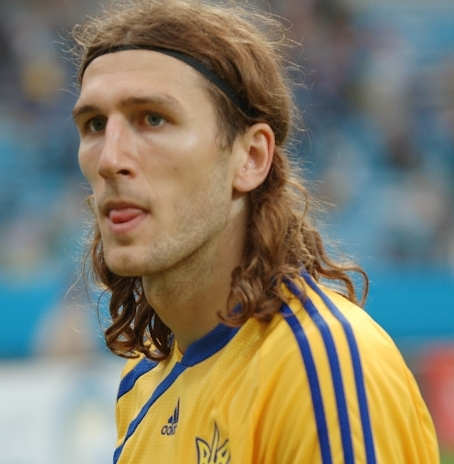
Chyhrynskyi playing for Ukraine in 2009

After a successful 2005–06 season, Chyhrynskyi was called up to the 2006 FIFA World Cup squad by coach Oleg Blokhin, following the injury to Serhiy Fedorov. Shortly before the World Cup, Chyhrynskyi was a member of the Ukraine under-21 team, which finished as runners-up in the 2006 UEFA European Under-21 Championship. Showing impressive form during the championship, he was selected as a member of the team of the tournament by UEFA. Although set to be a part of Ukraine's World Cup squad, Chyhrynskyi suffered an injury during the closing stages of under-21 competition, which forced him out of the entire forthcoming tournament.

Following his recovery from injury, Chyhrynskyi established himself as a starter for Ukraine in UEFA Euro 2008 qualifying.

== Managerial career ==
In September 2025, Chyhrynskyi became the assistant manager of Manolo Jiménez at Greek side Aris. On 10 July 2026, he was appointed as head coach of Cypriot First Division club Krasava Ypsonas.

== Career statistics ==
=== Club ===
As of 6 August 2023

Appearances and goals by club, season and competition
Club	Season	League			National cup (Note: Includes Ukrainian Cup, Copa del Rey, Greek Cup)		Europe		Other		Total	
Club	Season	Division	Apps	Goals	Apps	Goals	Apps	Goals	Apps	Goals	Apps	Goals
Shakhtar Donetsk	2003–04	Vyshcha Liha	1	0	0	0	0	0	0	0	1	0
Shakhtar Donetsk	2004–05	Vyshcha Liha	0	0	1	0	1	0	—		2	0
Shakhtar Donetsk	2005–06	Vyshcha Liha	11	3	0	0	2	0	—		13	3
Shakhtar Donetsk	2006–07	Vyshcha Liha	17	0	4	1	8 (Note: Four appearances in UEFA Champions League, four appearances in UEFA Cup)	0	—		29	1
Shakhtar Donetsk	2007–08	Vyshcha Liha	27	3	6	1	8 (Note: Appearances in UEFA Champions League)	0	1 (Note: Appearance in Ukrainian Super Cup)	0	42	4
Shakhtar Donetsk	2008–09	Ukrainian Premier League	23	1	3	0	15 (Note: Seven appearances in UEFA Champions League, eight appearances in UEFA Cup)	0	1	1	42	2
Shakhtar Donetsk	2009–10	Ukrainian Premier League	4	0	—		3 (Note: Two appearances in UEFA Champions League, one appearance in UEFA Europa League)	0	1 (Note: Appearance in UEFA Super Cup)	0	8	0
Shakhtar Donetsk	Total		83	7	14	2	37	0	3	1	137	10
Metalurh Zaporizhzhia (loan)	2005–06	Vyshcha Liha	15	2	3	0	—		—		18	2
Barcelona	2009–10	La Liga	12	0	2	0	0	0	—		14	0
Shakhtar Donetsk	2010–11	Ukrainian Premier League	16	2	0	0	5	1	—		21	3
Shakhtar Donetsk	2011–12	Ukrainian Premier League	6	0	1	0	2	0	—		9	0
Shakhtar Donetsk	2012–13	Ukrainian Premier League	11	1	3	0	1	0	—		15	1
Shakhtar Donetsk	2013–14	Ukrainian Premier League	3	1	0	0	0	0	1	0	4	1
Shakhtar Donetsk	2014–15	Ukrainian Premier League	1	0	2	1	0	0	—		3	1
Shakhtar Donetsk	Total		37	4	6	1	8	1	1	0	52	6
Dnipro	2014–15	Ukrainian Premier League	2	0	2	0	0	0	—		4	0
Dnipro	2015–16	Ukrainian Premier League	13	1	4	0	2 (Note: Appearances in UEFA Europa League)	0	—		19	1
Dnipro	Total		15	1	6	0	2	0	—		23	1
AEK Athens	2016–17	Super League Greece	16	1	4	0	2	0	—		22	1
AEK Athens	2017–18	Super League Greece	15	1	6	0	7 (Note: Two appearances in UEFA Champions League, five appearances in UEFA Cup)	0	—		28	1
AEK Athens	2018–19	Super League Greece	15	0	6	0	5	0	—		26	0
AEK Athens	2019–20	Super League Greece	21	3	4	0	1	0	—		26	3
AEK Athens	2020–21	Super League Greece	16	0	3	0	5	0	—		24	0
AEK Athens	Total		83	5	23	0	20	0	—		126	5
Ionikos	2021–22	Super League Greece	26	1	0	0	—		—		26	1
Ionikos	2022–23	Super League Greece	27	1	0	0	—		—		27	1
Ionikos	Total		53	2	0	0	—		—		53	2
Shakhtar Donetsk	2023–24	Ukrainian Premier League	3	0	1	0	0	0	—		4	0
Career total			301	21	55	3	67	1	4	1	427	26

=== International ===
Appearances and goals by national team and year
National team	Year	Apps	Goals
Ukraine	2007	7	0
Ukraine	2008	6	0
Ukraine	2009	8	0
Ukraine	2010	5	0
Ukraine	2011	3	0
Total		29	0

== Honours ==
Shakhtar Donetsk

- Vyshcha Liha/Ukrainian Premier League: 2004–05, 2005–06, 2007–08, 2010–11, 2012–13, 2023–24
- Ukrainian Cup: 2007–08, 2012–13
- Ukrainian Super Cup: 2008, 2013
- UEFA Cup: 2008–09

Barcelona

- La Liga: 2009–10
- FIFA Club World Cup: 2009

AEK Athens

- Super League Greece: 2017–18

Ukraine U21

- UEFA European Under-21 Championship runner-up: 2006

Individual

- UEFA European Under-21 Championship Team of the Tournament: 2006
- Super League Greece Team of the Season: 2017–18
