= Serhiy Tkachenko =

Ukrainian footballer

Personal information
- Full name: Serhiy Viktorovych Tkachenko
- Date of birth: 10 February 1979 (age 47)
- Place of birth: Odesa, Soviet Union
- Height: 1.72 m (5 ft 7 1/2 in)
- Position: Midfielder

Senior career*
Years	Team	Apps	(Gls)
1996–1997	SC Odesa	36	(6)
1997–1999	Chornomorets Odesa	49	(4)
1999–2002	CSKA / Arsenal Kyiv	55	(5)
2000–2001	→ CSKA-2 Kyiv	3	(0)
2002–2006	Metalurh Donetsk	105	(9)
2002–2004	→ Metalurh-2 Donetsk	2	(0)
2006–2008	Shakhtar Donetsk	5	(0)
2007	→ Chornomorets Odesa (loan)	14	(0)
2008	→ Metalurh Donetsk (loan)	6	(1)
2008–2010	Metalurh Donetsk	24	(1)
2011–2012	FC Odesa	10	(0)

International career
2003–2006	Ukraine	4	(0)
- * Club domestic league appearances and goals

Serhiy Tkachenko (Ukrainian: Сергій Вікторович Ткаченко; born 10 February 1979) is a Ukrainian former footballer.
