= Volodymyr Yezerskiy =

Ukrainian footballer

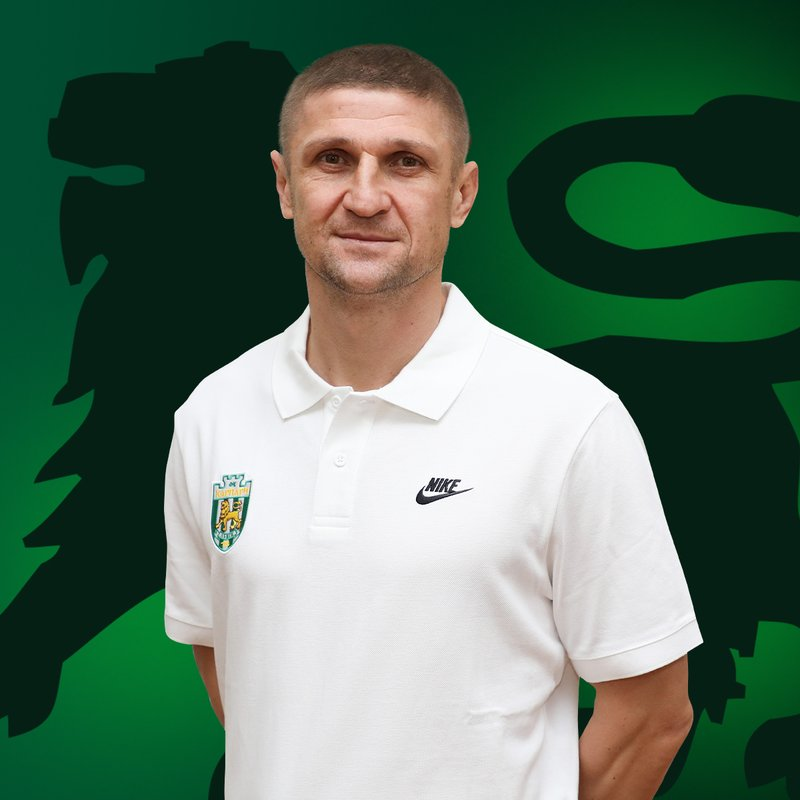
- Yezerskiy in 2023

Personal information
- Full name: Volodymyr Ivanovych Yezerskiy
- Date of birth: 15 November 1976 (age 49)
- Place of birth: Lviv, Ukrainian SSR, Soviet Union
- Height: 1.83 m (6 ft 0 in)
- Position: Defender

Team information
- Current team: Ukraine U19 (assistant)

Youth career
- SKA Lviv
- Dobrosyn

Senior career*
Years	Team	Apps	(Gls)
1995–1997	Harai Zhovkva	55	(3)
1997–1998	Karpaty Lviv	33	(0)
1997–1998	→ Karpaty-2 Lviv	9	(0)
1998–2000	Dynamo Kyiv	10	(0)
1999–2000	→ Dynamo-2 Kyiv	43	(3)
1999–2000	→ Dynamo-3 Kyiv	2	(0)
2000	→ Kryvbas Kryvyi Rih (loan)	9	(0)
2000–2007	Dnipro Dnipropetrovsk	146	(8)
2001–2002	→ Dnipro-2 Dnipropetrovsk	6	(0)
2002	→ Dnipro-3 Dnipropetrovsk	1	(0)
2007–2010	Shakhtar Donetsk	21	(1)
2010	→ Zorya Luhansk (loan)	11	(0)
2010–2011	Zorya Luhansk	20	(3)
2011–2013	Tavriya Simferopol	44	(0)
2013–2014	Hoverla Uzhhorod	9	(0)
Total		419	(18)

International career
1998–2008	Ukraine	39	(2)

Managerial career
- 2014–2016: Dnipro Dnipropetrovsk (assistant)
- 2017: Ukraine U19
- 2018: Ukraine U16
- 2019: Ukraine U17
- 2020: Ukraine U18
- 2021–2022: Ukraine U19
- 2022–2023: Ukraine U16
- 2023: Oleksandriya (assistant)
- 2023–2024: Ukraine U17
- 2024: Karpaty Lviv (assistant)
- 2024–: Ukraine U19 (assistant)
- * Club domestic league appearances and goals

Volodymyr Ivanovych Yezerskiy (Ukrainian: Володимир Іванович Єзерський; born 15 November 1976) is a Ukrainian former professional footballer who played as a defender. He also played for the Ukraine national team from 1998 till 2008. Yezerskiy is a Distinguished Master of Sports (2005).

== Career ==
=== Club ===
Yezerskiy started his professional football career in 1997 in Karpaty Lviv. Two years later, he was picked up by Ukrainian giants, Dynamo Kyiv, and, later, by Kryvbas Kryvyi Rih. In 2000, Yezerskiy left to Dnipro Dnipropetrovsk, where he became an integral part of the team. On 20 June 2007 he was signed by FC Shakhtar Donetsk on a 3-year deal with a transfer fee of €1.2 million from Dnipro Dnipropetrovsk. He was loaned out to Zorya Luhansk during the winter break of the 2009–10 Premier league season.

=== National ===
Yezerskiy played his first international game for the Ukraine national team on 15 July 1998 against the Poland national football team. However, after his successes in Dnipro, he became a regular player of the national team squad. He helped Ukraine qualify for their first World cup in 2006. Ukraine managed to get to the quarterfinals, losing to eventual world champions Italy.

=== International goals ===
Both of his goals were scored from a corner kick and were game openers.

#	Date	Venue	Opponent	Score	Result	Competition
1.	5 June 2006	Petrovskiy Stadium, St. Petersburg, Russia	Libya	1–0	3-0	Friendly
2.	24 March 2007	Svangaskarð, Toftir, Faroe Islands	Faroe Islands	0–1	0-2	UEFA Euro 2008 qualifying
Correct as of 6 June 2011

== Honours ==
=== Club ===
Shakhtar Donetsk

- Ukrainian Premier League: 2000, 2008, 2010
- Ukrainian Cup: 2008
- Ukrainian Super Cup: 2008
- UEFA Cup: 2009

=== Individual ===
- Ukrainian Bravery Order III Degree: 2006
