= 2006–07 FC Shakhtar Donetsk season =

Shakhtar Donetsk
2006–07 season
- Chairman: Rinat Akhmetov
- Manager: Mircea Lucescu
- Ground: RSC Olimpiyskiy
- Vyshcha Liha: 2nd
- Ukrainian Cup: Runners-up
- Super Cup: Runners-up
- Champions League: Group stage
- UEFA Cup: Round of 16
- Top goalscorer: League: Brandão (9); All: Matuzalém (12)
Home colours	Away colours

The 2006–07 season was FC Shakhtar Donetsk's 16th consecutive season in the top flight of Ukrainian football.

== Season summary ==
On 31 August, Jan Laštůvka left the club to sign a season-long loan deal with English Premier League club Fulham.

On 13 December, Shakhtar announced the signing of Andriy Pyatov from Vorskla Poltava in a €1m deal, and the signing of Oleksiy Polyanskyi from Metalurh Donetsk for €400,000, with both signing five-year contracts, whilst Pyatov remained at Vorskla Poltava on loan for the remainder of the season.

On 30 January, Julius Aghahowa left the club to sign for English Premier League club Wigan Athletic for an undisclosed fee.

On 19 February, Leonardo returned to Brazil, joining Santos on loan until 31 December 2007.

On 27 February, Anatoliy Tymoshchuk left the club to sign for Russian Premier League club Zenit St.Petersburg for a record fee in excess of €15m.

On 3 March, Shakhtar signed Luiz Adriano from Internacional for a reported €3 million transfer fee.

== Squad ==
As of match played 17 June 2007

Number	Name	Nationality	Position	Date of birth (Age)	Signed from	Signed in	Contract ends	Apps.	Goals
Goalkeepers
1	Bohdan Shust	(Ukraine)	GK	4 March 1986 (aged 21)	Karpaty Lviv	2005			
12	Dmytro Shutkov	(Ukraine)	GK	3 April 1972 (aged 35)	Youth Team	1991		345	0
35	Yuriy Virt	(Ukraine)	GK	4 May 1974 (aged 33)	Metalurh Donetsk	2007			
	Oleksandr Kupalnyi	(Ukraine)	GK	21 March 1986 (aged 21)	Academy	2004			
Defenders
3	Tomáš Hübschman	(Czech Republic)	DF	4 September 1981 (aged 25)	Sparta Prague	2004	2009	88	4
5	Oleksandr Kucher	(Ukraine)	DF	22 October 1982 (aged 24)	Metalist Kharkiv	2006		23	1
13	Vyacheslav Shevchuk	(Ukraine)	DF	13 May 1979 (aged 28)	Dnipro Dnipropetrovsk	2005		71	0
18	Mariusz Lewandowski	(Poland)	DF	18 May 1979 (aged 28)	Dyskobolia Grodzisk	2001		198	25
26	Răzvan Raț	(Romania)	DF	26 May 1981 (aged 26)	Rapid București	2003		133	3
27	Dmytro Chyhrynskyi	(Ukraine)	DF	7 November 1986 (aged 20)	Academy	2002		45	4
28	Oleksiy Polyanskyi	(Ukraine)	DF	12 April 1986 (aged 21)	Metalurh Donetsk	2006		6	0
33	Darijo Srna (Captain)	(Croatia)	DF	1 May 1982 (aged 25)	Hajduk Split	2003		138	11
	Maxim Kosarev	(Ukraine)	DF		Academy				
	Ihor Oshchypko	(Ukraine)	DF	25 October 1985 (aged 21)	Academy	2004			
	Oleh Yermak	(Ukraine)	DF	9 March 1986 (aged 21)	Naftovyk Okhtyrka	2002			
Midfielders
6	Igor Duljaj	(Serbia)	MF	29 October 1979 (aged 27)	Partizan	2004	2008	123	3
7	Fernandinho	(Brazil)	MF	4 May 1985 (aged 22)	Paranaense	2005	2010	115	19
9	Matuzalém	(Brazil)	MF	10 June 1980 (aged 27)	Brescia	2004			
10	Zvonimir Vukić	(Serbia)	MF	19 July 1979 (aged 27)	Partizan	2003	2008	97	20
19	Oleksiy Hai	(Ukraine)	MF	6 November 1982 (aged 24)	Illichivets Mariupol	2000		101	9
22	Maksym Trusevych	(Ukraine)	MF	1 August 1985 (aged 21)	Borysfen Boryspil	2005			
36	Elano	(Brazil)	MF	14 June 1981 (aged 26)	Santos	2005	2010	77	22
38	Jádson	(Brazil)	MF	5 October 1983 (aged 23)	Paranaense	2005	2009	91	18
	Denys Kozhanov	(Ukraine)	MF	13 June 1987 (aged 20)	Academy	2005			
	Oleksandr Miroshnychenko	(Ukraine)	MF	19 January 1986 (aged 21)	Academy	2003			
	Stanislav Mykytsey	(Ukraine)	MF	7 September 1989 (aged 17)	Academy	2005			
	Vadym Shavrin	(Ukraine)	MF	15 May 1988 (aged 19)	Academy	2004			
	Serhiy Shevchuk	(Ukraine)	MF	18 June 1985 (aged 21)	Systema-Borex Borodyanka	2004			
	Andriy Shybko	(Ukraine)	MF	13 January 1988 (aged 19)	Academy	2004			
	Platon Svyrydov	(Ukraine)	MF	20 November 1986 (aged 20)	Academy	2003			
Forwards
11	Andriy Vorobey	(Ukraine)	FW	29 November 1978 (aged 28)	Academy	1995		319	144
17	Luiz Adriano	(Brazil)	FW	12 April 1987 (aged 20)	Internacional	2007		6	0
20	Oleksiy Byelik	(Ukraine)	FW	15 February 1981 (aged 26)	Youth team	1998		204	65
24	Ruslan Fomin	(Ukraine)	FW	2 March 1986 (aged 21)	Arsenal Kharkiv	2005		10	3
25	Brandão	(Brazil)	FW	16 June 1980 (aged 27)	Iraty	2002	2007	160	66
29	Ciprian Marica	(Romania)	FW	2 October 1985 (aged 21)	Dinamo București	2004	2008	118	24
	Vladyslav Holopyorov	(Ukraine)	FW	10 October 1983 (aged 23)	Academy	2000			
Away on loan
8	Leonardo	(Brazil)	DF	9 March 1986 (aged 21)	Santos	2005	2010	23	0
16	Jan Laštůvka	(Czech Republic)	GK	7 July 1982 (aged 24)	Baník Ostrava	2004		63	0
32	Vyacheslav Sviderskyi	(Ukraine)	DF	1 January 1979 (aged 28)	Saturn Moscow Oblast	2005			
34	Oleh Karamushka	(Ukraine)	DF	30 April 1984 (aged 23)	Borysfen Boryspil	2005			
37	Serhiy Tkachenko	(Ukraine)	MF	10 February 1979 (aged 28)	Metalurh Donetsk	2006			
	Andriy Pyatov	(Ukraine)	GK	28 June 1984 (aged 22)	Vorskla Poltava	2007		0	0
	Yevhen Bredun	(Ukraine)	MF	10 September 1982 (aged 24)	Youth team	2000			
Players who left during the season
4	Anatoliy Tymoshchuk	(Ukraine)	MF	30 March 1979 (aged 28)	Volyn Lutsk	1998		326	39
15	Emmanuel Okoduwa	(Nigeria)	FW	21 November 1983 (aged 23)	Arsenal Kyiv	2006		8	4
16	Stipe Pletikosa	(Croatia)	GK	8 January 1979 (aged 28)	Hajduk Split	2003		39	0
17	Julius Aghahowa	(Nigeria)	FW	12 February 1982 (aged 25)	Espérance	2000		150	51

== Transfers ==
=== In ===
Date From	Position	Nationality	Name	From	Fee	Ref.
13 December 2006	GK	(Ukraine)	Andriy Pyatov	Vorskla Poltava	€1,000,000	
13 December 2006	MF	(Ukraine)	Oleksiy Polyanskyi	Metalurh Donetsk	€400,000	
3 March 2007	FW	(Brazil)	Luiz Adriano	Internacional	Undisclosed	

=== Out ===
Date From	Position	Nationality	Name	To	Fee	Ref.
1 January 2007	FW	(Nigeria)	Emmanuel Okoduwa	Metalurh Donetsk	Undisclosed	
30 January 2007	FW	(Nigeria)	Julius Aghahowa	Wigan Athletic	Undisclosed	
27 February 2007	MF	(Ukraine)	Anatoliy Tymoshchuk	Zenit St.Petersburg	Undisclosed	
7 March 2007	GK	(Croatia)	Stipe Pletikosa	Spartak Moscow	Undisclosed	

=== Loans out ===
Date From	Position	Nationality	Name	To	Date To	Ref.
31 August 2006	GK	(Czech Republic)	Jan Laštůvka	Fulham	30 June 2007	
13 December 2006	GK	(Ukraine)	Andriy Pyatov	Vorskla Poltava	30 June 2007	
1 January 2007	DF	(Ukraine)	Vyacheslav Sviderskyi	Chornomorets Odesa	Undisclosed	
1 January 2007	MF	(Ukraine)	Serhiy Tkachenko	Chornomorets Odesa	Undisclosed	
19 February 2007	DF	(Brazil)	Leonardo	Santos	31 December 2007	

== Competitions ==
=== Overall ===
Competition	First match	Last match	Starting round	Final position	Record							
Competition	First match	Last match	Starting round	Final position	Pld	W	D	L	GF	GA	GD	Win %
Vyshcha Liha	23 July 2006	17 June 2007	Matchday 1	Runnersup	30	19	6	5	57	20	+37	63.33
Ukrainian Cup	20 September 2006	27 May 2007	Round of 32	Runnersup	7	4	2	1	18	6	+12	57.14
Super Cup	16 July 2006		Final	Runnersup	1	0	0	1	0	2	−2	0.00
UEFA Champions League	9 August 2006	5 December 2006	Third qualifying round	Group Stage	8	3	3	2	10	13	−3	37.50
UEFA Cup	14 February 2007	15 March 2007	Round of 32	Round of 16	4	1	2	1	6	6	+0	25.00
Total					50	27	13	10	91	47	+44	54.00

Last updated: 17 June 2007
Source: Results

=== Super Cup ===
16 July 2006	Dynamo Kyiv	2–0	Shakhtar Donetsk	Odesa
20:30 EEST (UTC+3)	Marković 10' (yellow card) 36'; Rodrigo (penalty missed) 59'; Milevskyi 88'	Report	Brandão (yellow card) 55'; Fernandinho (yellow card) 90+2'	Stadium: Central Stadium; Attendance: 34,000; Referee: Vitaliy Hodulian

=== Vyshcha Liha ===
==== League table ====
Pos	Team	Pld	W	D	L	GF	GA	GD	Pts	Qualification or relegation
1	Dynamo Kyiv (C)	30	22	8	0	67	23	+44	74	Qualification to Champions League third qualifying round
2	Shakhtar Donetsk	30	19	6	5	57	20	+37	63	Qualification to Champions League second qualifying round
3	Metalist Kharkiv	30	18	7	5	40	20	+20	61	Qualification to UEFA Cup first round
4	Dnipro Dnipropetrovsk	30	11	14	5	32	24	+8	47	Qualification to UEFA Cup second qualifying round
5	Tavriya Simferopol	30	12	6	12	32	30	+2	42	

Source: uafootball.net.ua
(C) Champions

==== Results summary ====
Overall								Home						Away					
Pld	W	D	L	GF	GA	GD	Pts	W	D	L	GF	GA	GD	W	D	L	GF	GA	GD
0	0	0	0	0	0	0	0	0	0	0	0	0	0	0	0	0	0	0	0

Last updated: 17 June 2007.
Source: Results

==== Results by round ====
Round	1
Ground	
Result	
Position	

Updated to match(es) played on 17 June 2007. Source: Results
A = Away; H = Home; W = Win; D = Draw; L = Loss

==== Results ====
23 July 2006 1	Shakhtar Donetsk	5–0	Kryvbas Kryvyi Rih	Donetsk
19:00 EEST (UTC+3)	Matuzalém 29'; Srna (yellow card) 34'; Elano 41', 50'; Brandão 43'; Jádson (yellow card) 58'; Marica 77'	Report	Olefir (yellow card) 13'	Stadium: RSC Olimpiyskiy; Attendance: 22,000; Referee: Viktor Shvetsov

30 July 2006 2	Zorya Luhansk	0–2	Shakhtar Donetsk	Luhansk
19:00 EEST (UTC+3)	Ibanda (yellow card) 8' (yellow-red card) 27'; Smalko (yellow card) 30'; Vyshnyak (yellow card) 35'	Report	Matuzalém (yellow card) 8'; Aghahowa (yellow card) 19' (goal) 22'; Shevchuk (yellow card) 67'; Marica 71'	Stadium: Avanhard Stadium; Attendance: 20,000; Referee: Anatoliy Zhosan

4 August 2006 3	Shakhtar Donetsk	5–0	Metalist Kharkiv	Donetsk
19:00 EEST (UTC+3)	Hübschman (yellow card) 10'; Marica 21'; Elano 33', 39'; Tymoshchuk 35'; Byelik 53'; Srna (yellow card) 34'	Report	Mrdaković (yellow card) 8'; Khomyn (yellow card) 46'	Stadium: RSC Olimpiyskiy; Attendance: 23,000; Referee: Victor Denisyuk

19 August 2006 4	Metalurh Donetsk	0–0	Shakhtar Donetsk	Donetsk
19:00 EEST (UTC+3)	Boussaïdi (yellow card) 26'; Melnyk (yellow card) 45+1'; Zé Leandro (yellow card) 60'; Demetradze (yellow card) 79'; Sérgio (yellow card) 90+2'; Virt (yellow card) 90+4'	Report	Matuzalém (yellow card) 30'; Lewandowski (yellow card) 59'; Tymoshchuk (yellow card) 90+2'	Stadium: Shakhtar Stadium; Attendance: 22,000; Referee: Florian Meier

27 August 2006 5	Shakhtar Donetsk	3–1	Illichivets Mariupol	Donetsk
19:00 EEST (UTC+3)	Byelik 57', 58'; Hai 71'; Jádson (yellow card) 79'	Report	Tsykhmeystruk (yellow card) 10' (yellow-red card) 35'; Maltsev (yellow card) 18'; Yesin 52'	Stadium: RSC Olimpiyskiy; Attendance: 20,000; Referee: Vladimir Sirenko

9 September 2006 6	Vorskla Poltava	0–1	Shakhtar Donetsk	Poltava
17:00 EEST (UTC+3)	Markoski (yellow card) 22'; Yarmash (yellow card) 58'; Kondratyuk (yellow card) 69'; Kravchenko (yellow card) 72'	Report	Yarmash 3' (o.g.); Hübschman (yellow card) 20' (yellow-red card) 39'; Brandão (yellow card) 82'	Stadium: Vorskla Stadium; Attendance: 7,600; Referee: Viktor Denisyuk

17 September 2006 7	Shakhtar Donetsk	3–0	Tavriya Simferopol	Donetsk
17:00 EEST (UTC+3)	Sviderskyi (yellow card) 38'; Elano 43'; Byelik 52'; Lewandowski 66'	Report	Homenyuk (yellow card) 17'; Edmar (yellow card) 42'; Cilinšek (yellow card) 65'	Stadium: RSC Olimpiyskiy; Attendance: 22,000; Referee: Orest Shmigelsky

23 September 2006 8	Dnipro Dnipropetrovsk	1–1	Shakhtar Donetsk	Poltava
19:00 EEST (UTC+3)	Kornilenko 15'; Glavina (yellow card) 35'; Nazarenko (yellow card) 60'; Yezerskiy (yellow card) 60'; Yezerskiy (yellow card) 60'; Kravchenko (yellow card) 83'; Bartulović (yellow card) 88'	Report	Srna (yellow card) 37'; Duljaj 45'; Elano (yellow card) 55'	Stadium: Vorskla Stadium; Attendance: 7,600; Referee: Andriy Shandor

1 October 2006 9	Shakhtar Donetsk	3–1	Stal Alchevsk	Donetsk
17:00 EEST (UTC+3)	Byelik 17', 62'; Srna (yellow card) 42'; Raţ (yellow card) 71'; Vorobey 72'; Kucher (yellow card) 90+1'	Report	Kasyanov (yellow card) 27'; Polovkov (yellow card) 40'; Bito (yellow card) 42'; Havryushov (yellow card) 53'; Melikyan 81'	Stadium: RSC Olimpiyskiy; Attendance: 12,000; Referee: Yuriy Moseychuk

14 October 2006 10	Kharkiv	0–3	Shakhtar Donetsk	Kharkiv
16:00 EEST (UTC+3)	Oprya (yellow card) 16'; Stoyko (yellow card) 18'; Ribeiro (yellow card) 43'	Report	Marica 9'; Jadson (penalty missed) 19'; Aghahowa 40'; Fernandinho (yellow card) 45+1'; Brandão 64'	Stadium: OSC Metalist; Attendance: 13,000; Referee: Yuriy Moseychuk

22 October 2006 11	Shakhtar Donetsk	0–1	Arsenal Kyiv	Donetsk
16:00 EEST (UTC+3)	Marica (yellow card) 45'	Report	Kankava (yellow card) 15' (goal) 64'	Stadium: RSC Olimpiyskiy; Attendance: 22,000; Referee: Ihor Pokydko

27 October 2006 12	Shakhtar Donetsk	4–1	Karpaty Lviv	Donetsk
19:00 EEST (UTC+3)	Brandão 30'; Lewandowski 63'; Matuzalém 79' (pen.); Aghahowa 90+1'	Report	Srna 17' (o.g.); Ishchenko (yellow card) 63'; Batista (yellow card) 69'; Godwin (yellow card) 90+3'	Stadium: RSC Olimpiyskiy; Attendance: 18,000; Referee: Vladimir Sirenko

6 November 2006 13	Dynamo Kyiv	1–0	Shakhtar Donetsk	Kyiv
18:00 EET (UTC+2)	Milevskyi (yellow card) 60' (yellow-red card) 67'; Shatskikh 73'; Marković (yellow card) 79'	Report	Marica (yellow card) 40'; Chyhrynskyi (red card) 42'; Brandão (yellow card) 42'; Hübschman (yellow card) 45'; Lewandowski (yellow card) 45'; Shust (yellow card) 66'; Fernandinho (yellow card) 90+1'; Srna (red card) FT	Stadium: Valeriy Lobanovskyi Dynamo Stadium; Attendance: 14,600; Referee: Paulo Manuel Gomes Costa

11 November 2006 14	Shakhtar Donetsk	2–0	Chornomorets Odesa	Donetsk
16:00 EET (UTC+2)	Byelik 17'; Jádson 22' (red card) 52'	Report	Symonenko (yellow card) 19'; Shashiashvili (yellow card) 52'; Nizhegorodov (yellow card) 71'	Stadium: RSC Olimpiyskiy; Attendance: 18,000; Referee: Ihor Podushkin

18 November 2006 15	Metalurh Zaporizhzhia	0–3	Shakhtar Donetsk	Zaporizhzhia
18:00 EET (UTC+2)	Karamushka (yellow card) 36'; Hodin (yellow card) 37'; Tasevski (yellow card) 82'	Report	Brandão 24', 48', 90+3'; Raț (yellow card) 38'; Fernandinho (yellow card) 53'; Chyhrynskyi (yellow card) 75'; Kucher (yellow card) 90+3'	Stadium: Slavutych-Arena; Attendance: 8,500; Referee: Viktor Shvetsov

27 November 2006 16	Kryvbas Kryvyi Rih	0–1	Shakhtar Donetsk	Kryvyi Rih
19:00 EET (UTC+2)	Burduli (yellow card) 41'	Report	Duljaj (yellow card) 42'; Vorobey 80'	Stadium: Metalurh Stadium; Attendance: 7,000; Referee: Yevhen Herenda

3 March 2007 17	Shakhtar Donetsk	3–0	Zorya Luhansk	Donetsk
16:00 EET (UTC+2)	Jádson (yellow card) 23' (goal) 53'; Matuzalém 36'; Fernandinho 61'; Duljaj (yellow card) 73'	Report	Ibanda (yellow card) 13'; Kormiltsev (yellow card) 29'; Nikitin (yellow card) 33'	Stadium: RSC Olimpiyskiy; Attendance: 13,000; Referee: Andriy Shandor

11 March 2007 18	Metalist Kharkiv	0–1	Shakhtar Donetsk	Kharkiv
18:00 EET (UTC+2)	Obradović (yellow card) 47'; Gancarczyk (yellow card) 61'; Valyayev (yellow card) 90+2'	Report	Vukić (yellow card) 24'; Marica 25'; Duljaj (yellow card) 35'; Byelik (yellow card) 64'	Stadium: Metalist Stadium; Attendance: 27,200; Referee: Ihor Pokydko

19 March 2007 19	Shakhtar Donetsk	2–1	Metalurh Donetsk	Donetsk
17:00 EET (UTC+2)	Elano (yellow card) 9'; Vukić 27'; Kucher (yellow card) 49'; Chyhrynskyi (yellow card) 57'; Beqiri 63' (o.g.); Marica (yellow card) 90+3'	Report	Zézé (yellow card) 5' (goal) 77'; Zé Leandro (yellow card) 9'; Mendoza (yellow card) 23'; Volovyk (yellow card) 29'; Fernández (yellow card) 84'	Stadium: RSC Olimpiyskiy; Attendance: 17,300; Referee: Volodymyr Sirenko

1 April 2007 20	Illichivets Mariupol	1–1	Shakhtar Donetsk	Mariupol
16:00 EEST (UTC+3)	Hakobyan (yellow card) 29'; Tsykhmeystruk (yellow card) 34'; Kryvosheyenko 65'; Lașcencov (red card) 77'; Shukhovtsev (yellow card) 90+5'	Report	Fernandinho (yellow card) 26'; Brandão (yellow card) 59'; Matuzalém 75'; Hübschman (yellow card) 90+3'	Stadium: Volodymyr Boyko Stadium; Attendance: 12,500; Referee: Sergiy Berezka

7 April 2007 21	Shakhtar Donetsk	2–1	Vorskla Poltava	Donetsk
18:00 EEST (UTC+3)	Matuzalém 4', 82' (pen.); Byelik (yellow card) 63'; Polyanskyi (yellow card) 71'	Report	Kravchenko (yellow card) 13'; Dallku (yellow card) 65'; Grumić (yellow card) 87'; Januzi 90'	Stadium: RSC Olimpiyskiy; Attendance: 20,500; Referee: Evgeniy Abrosimov

1 April 2007 22	Tavriya Simferopol	1–3	Shakhtar Donetsk	Simferopol
16:00 EEST (UTC+3)	Veikutis (yellow card) 20'; Solyanyk (yellow card) 42'; Holaydo 56'	Report	Lewandowski 14'; Kucher (yellow card) 44'; Byelik (yellow card) 48'; Matuzalém (yellow card) 54' (goal) 90+3'; Brandão (yellow card) 76' (goal) 80'	Stadium: RSC Lokomotyv; Attendance: 19,000; Referee: Vitaliy Hodulian

23 April 2007 23	Shakhtar Donetsk	2–3	Dnipro Dnipropetrovsk	Donetsk
19:00 EEST (UTC+3)	Matuzalém (penalty missed) 23'; Brandão (yellow card) 28' (goal) 78'; Jádson 49' (yellow card) 86'; Kucher (yellow card) 52'; Fernandinho (yellow card) 66'	Report	Kornilenko 45+2'; Nazarenko 55' (yellow card) 86'; Samodin 58'; Rusol (yellow card) 65'; Denisov (yellow card) 68'; Morais (yellow card) 72'; Startsev (yellow card) 84'	Stadium: RSC Olimpiyskiy; Attendance: 23,000; Referee: Yuriy Moseychuk

29 April 2007 24	Stal Alchevsk	0–2	Shakhtar Donetsk	Alchevsk
18:00 EEST (UTC+3)	Essola (yellow card) 7'; Bito (yellow card) 72'; Polovkov (yellow card) 87'; Grubelić (yellow card) 89'; Suga (yellow card) 90+4'	Report	Srna 59', 78' (yellow card) 72'; Fernandinho (yellow card) 74'	Stadium: Stal Alchevsk Stadium; Attendance: 9,000; Referee: Orest Shmigelskyi

6 May 2007 25	Shakhtar Donetsk	1–2	Kharkiv	Donetsk
18:00 EEST (UTC+3)	Srna (penalty missed) 17' 64'; Byelik (yellow card) 60'; Elano (penalty missed) 64' (yellow card) 65'; Brandão (yellow card) 64'; Duljaj (yellow card) 74'	Report	Sokolenko 8'; Berezovchuk (yellow card) 17'; Pankavets (yellow card) 31'; Hladkyi (yellow card) 48' (goal) 52'; Hunchak (yellow card) 57'; Horodov (yellow card) 65'; Smalko (yellow card) 85' (yellow-red card) 90+1'	Stadium: RSC Olimpiyskiy; Attendance: 20,000; Referee: Vladimir Sirenko

13 May 2007 26	Arsenal Kyiv	1–2	Shakhtar Donetsk	Kyiv
18:00 EEST (UTC+3)	Jakobia 4'; Yevseyev (yellow card) 14'; Seleznyov (yellow card) 40'	Report	Hai (yellow card) 6' (yellow-red card) 87'; Vorobey (yellow card) 11'; Raț (yellow card) 40'; Vukić 69' (pen.); Marica 82'; Fernandinho (yellow card) 82'	Stadium: Valeriy Lobanovskyi Dynamo Stadium; Attendance: 3,500; Referee: Andriy Shandor

19 May 2007 27	Karpaty Lviv	0–0	Shakhtar Donetsk	Lviv
16:00 EEST (UTC+3)	Ishchenko (yellow card) 48'; Tkachuk (yellow card) 54'; Batista (yellow card) 57' (yellow-red card) 65'; Petrivskyi (yellow card) 77'	Report	Fernandinho (yellow card) 51'; Vukić (red card) 48'	Stadium: Ukraina Stadium; Attendance: 28,180; Referee: Ihor Podushkin

23 May 2007 28	Shakhtar Donetsk	2–2	Dynamo Kyiv	Donetsk
19:00 EEST (UTC+3)	Matuzalém (yellow card) 7'; Lewandowski 18'; Brandão 49' (pen.); Kucher (yellow card) 71'	Report	Kléber 26'; Ninković (yellow card) 43'; Rincón (yellow card) 47' (goal) 57'; Yussuf (yellow card) 51'; Corrêa (yellow card) 60'	Stadium: RSC Olimpiyskiy; Attendance: 26,100; Referee: Vitaliy Hodulian

10 June 2007 29	Chornomorets Odesa	0–0	Shakhtar Donetsk	Odesa
18:00 EEST (UTC+3)		Report	Lewandowski (yellow card) 37'; Marica (yellow card) 51'; Shevchuk (yellow card) 54'; Hai (yellow card) 90+3'	Stadium: Chornomorets Stadium; Attendance: 8,500; Referee: Yuriy Moseychuk

17 June 2007 30	Shakhtar Donetsk	0–2	Metalurh Zaporizhzhia	Donetsk
18:00 EEST (UTC+3)	Shevchuk (yellow card) 88'	Report	Hay 27'; Borsh 85'; Nevmyvaka (yellow card) 89'	Stadium: RSC Olimpiyskiy; Attendance: 11,000; Referee: Yevhen Herenda

=== Ukrainian Cup ===
20 September 2006 Round of 32	Yavir Krasnopillya	1–6	Shakhtar Donetsk	Sumy
18:00 EEST (UTC+3)	Myhal 57' (yellow card) 58'; Shepel (yellow card) 81'	Report	Vukić 9', 82'; Okoduwa 16', 45'; Jádson 21'; Brandão 50'; Jádson (yellow card) 78'	Stadium: Yuvileiny Stadium; Attendance: 9,800; Referee: Ihor Pokydko

25 October 2006 Round of 16	Borysfen Boryspil	0–2	Shakhtar Donetsk	Boryspil
15:00 EEST (UTC+3)	Mostovyi (yellow card) 23'	Report	Vukić (yellow card) 53'; Tymoshchuk 59'; Vorobey 75'	Stadium: Kolos Stadium; Attendance: 22,000; Referee: Andriy Shandor

1 December 2006 Quarterfinal 1st leg	Sevastopol	0–1	Shakhtar Donetsk	Sevastopol
13:00 EET (UTC+2)	Chernopiskiy (yellow card) 65'	Report	Leonardo (yellow card) 21'; Fernandinho (yellow card) 25'; Okoduwa 28'; Shevchuk (yellow card) 39'; Elano (yellow card) 80'	Stadium: Sevastopol Sports Complex; Attendance: 5,000; Referee: Ihor Pokydko

9 December 2006 Quarterfinal 2nd leg	Shakhtar Donetsk	6–1 (7–1 agg.)	Sevastopol	Donetsk
14:00 EET (UTC+2)	Byelik 7', 59', 79'; Okoduwa 31'; Kaika 35' (o.g.); Kucher 41'; Vorobey (penalty missed) 61'	Report	Shevchuk 28'; Kaika (yellow card) 31'	Stadium: RSC Olimpiyskiy; Attendance: 9,000; Referee: Serhiy Berezka

18 April 2007 Semifinal 1st leg	Shakhtar Donetsk	0–0	Tavriya Simferopol	Donetsk
19:00 EEST (UTC+3)	Srna (yellow card) 39'; Byelik (yellow card) 65'; Hübschman (yellow card) 90+2'	Report	Haliuza (yellow card) 19'; Edmar (yellow card) 36'; Jokšas (yellow card) 57'; Kovpak (yellow card) 88'	Stadium: RSC Olimpiyskiy; Attendance: 21,000; Referee: Andriy Shandor

9 May 2007 Semifinal 2nd leg	Tavriya Simferopol	2–2 (2–2 agg.)	Shakhtar Donetsk	Simferopol
18:00 EEST (UTC+3)	Homenyuk 3'; Zelmikas 6' (yellow card) 58'; Rozghon (yellow card) 36'	Report	Matuzalém (yellow card) 22' (goal) 26'; Chyhrynskyi 23'; Srna (yellow card) 28'	Stadium: Lokomotiv RSC; Attendance: 17,000; Referee: Serhiy Zadiran

27 May 2007 Final	Shakhtar Donetsk	1–2	Dynamo Kyiv	Kyiv
19:00 EEST (UTC+3)	Chyhrynskyi (yellow card) 41'; Raț (yellow card) 50'; Hübschman (yellow card) 53'; Brandão (yellow card) 56'; Srna (yellow card) 86'; Elano 89'; Hai (yellow card) 90+2'	Report	Rodrigo (yellow card) 27' (yellow-red card) 71'; Kléber (yellow card) 52' (goal) 58'; Corrêa (yellow card) 67'; Husiev 80'	Stadium: Olympic Stadium; Attendance: 64,500; Referee: Andriy Shandor

=== UEFA Champions League ===
==== Qualifying rounds ====
9 August 2006 Third qualifying round 1st leg	Shakhtar Donetsk (Ukraine)	1–0	(Poland) Legia Warsaw	Donetsk, Ukraine
19:30 EEST (UTC+3)	Elano 19' (pen.) (yellow card) 40'; Fernandinho (yellow card) 69'	Report	Szala (yellow card) 52'; Baldé (yellow card) 89'	Stadium: RSC Olimpiyskiy; Attendance: 24,000; Referee: Frank De Bleeckere (Belgium)

23 August 2006 Third qualifying round 2nd leg	Legia Warsaw (Poland)	2–3 (2–4 agg.)	(Ukraine) Shakhtar Donetsk	Warsaw, Poland
21:30 EEST (UTC+3)	Włodarczyk 19', 88'; Surma (yellow card) 21'; Roger (yellow card) 57'	Report	Fernandinho (yellow card) 16' (goal) 29'; Matuzalém (yellow card) 19'; Marica 25', 45+5'	Stadium: Polish Army Stadium; Attendance: 8,700; Referee: Mike Riley (England)

==== Group stage ====
Pos	Team	Pld	W	D	L	GF	GA	GD	Pts	Qualification
1	(Spain) Valencia	6	4	1	1	12	6	+6	13	Advance to knockout stage
2	(Italy) Roma	6	3	1	2	8	4	+4	10	Advance to knockout stage
3	(Ukraine) Shakhtar Donetsk	6	1	3	2	6	11	−5	6	Transfer to UEFA Cup
4	(Greece) Olympiacos	6	0	3	3	6	11	−5	3	

Source: RSSSF

12 September 2006 1	Roma (Italy)	4–0	(Ukraine) Shakhtar Donetsk	Rome, Italy
21:45 EEST (UTC+3)	Aquilani (yellow card) 30'; Taddei 67'; Totti 76'; De Rossi 79'; Pizarro 89'	Report	Marica (yellow card) 14'; Tymoshchuk (yellow card) 29'; Hübschman (yellow card) 84'	Stadium: Stadio Olimpico; Attendance: 34,035; Referee: Bertrand Layec (France)

27 September 2006 2	Shakhtar Donetsk (Ukraine)	2–2	(Greece) Olympiacos	Donetsk, Ukraine
21:45 EEST (UTC+3)	Matuzalém 34'; Lewandowski (yellow card) 35'; Marica 70'; Hübschman (yellow card) 72'; Tymoshchuk (yellow card) 90+3'	Report	Konstantinou 24'; Marić (yellow card) 33'; Pantos (yellow card) 65'; Castillo 68'; Georgatos (yellow card) 69'	Stadium: RSC Olimpiyskiy; Attendance: 25,500; Referee: Eric Braamhaar (Netherlands)

18 October 2006 3	Valencia (Spain)	2–0	(Ukraine) Shakhtar Donetsk	Valencia, Spain
21:45 EEST (UTC+3)	Villa 31', 45'; Albelda (yellow card) 42'	Report	Sviderskyi (yellow card) 1' (yellow-red card) 76'; Tymoshchuk (yellow card) 33'; Marica (yellow card) 58'; Brandão (yellow card) 62'	Stadium: Mestalla Stadium; Attendance: 33,540; Referee: Mike Riley (England)

31 October 2006 4	Shakhtar Donetsk (Ukraine)	2–2	(Spain) Valencia	Donetsk, Ukraine
21:45 EET (UTC+2)	Jádson 3'; Fernandinho 28'; Brandão (yellow card) 47'; Hübschman (yellow card) 54'; Srna (yellow card) 66'; Lewandowski (yellow card) 75'; Matuzalém (yellow card) 84'	Report	Morientes 18'; Villa (yellow card) 55'; Ayala 68'; Angulo (yellow card) 90'	Stadium: RSC Olimpiyskiy; Attendance: 25,800; Referee: Peter Frøjdfeldt (Sweden)

22 November 2006 5	Shakhtar Donetsk (Ukraine)	1–0	(Italy) Roma	Donetsk, Ukraine
21:45 EET (UTC+2)	Marica 61'	Report	Perrotta (yellow card) 45+2'; Mexès (yellow card) 84'; Cassetti (yellow card) 84'; Pizarro (yellow card) 89'	Stadium: RSC Olimpiyskiy; Attendance: 23,900; Referee: Wolfgang Stark (Germany)

5 December 2006 6	Olympiacos (Greece)	1–1	(Ukraine) Shakhtar Donetsk	Piraeus, Greece
21:45 EET (UTC+2)	Castillo 54'; Konstantinou (yellow card) 90+3'; Marić (yellow card) 90+3'	Report	Brandão (yellow card) 13'; Matuzalém 27'; Kucher (yellow card) 37'; Shust (yellow card) 54'; Raț (yellow card) 84' (yellow-red card) 90'	Stadium: Karaiskakis Stadium; Attendance: 30,805; Referee: Steve Bennett (England)

=== UEFA Cup ===
==== Knockout stage ====
14 February 2007 Round of 32 1st leg	Shakhtar Donetsk (Ukraine)	1–1	(France) Nancy	Donetsk, Ukraine
19:00 EET (UTC+2)	Tymoshchuk (red card) 40'; Fernandinho (yellow card) 59'; Kucher (yellow card) 76'; Srna (yellow card) 83' (goal) 84'	Report	Duchemin (yellow card) 48'; Curbelo (yellow card) 75'; Fortuné 81'	Stadium: RSC Olimpiyskiy; Attendance: 24,800; Referee: Athanassios Briakos (Greece)

22 February 2007 Round of 32 2nd leg	Nancy (France)	0–1 (1–2 agg.)	(Ukraine) Shakhtar Donetsk	Tomblaine, France
20:00 EET (UTC+2)	Puygrenier (yellow card) 7'	Report	Kucher (yellow card) 9'; Fernandinho (yellow card) 17' (goal) 71'; Brandão (yellow card) 64'; Lewandowski (yellow card) 81'; Marica (yellow card) 88'	Stadium: Stade Marcel Picot; Attendance: 16,564; Referee: Grzegorz Gilewski (Poland)

8 March 2007 Round of 16 1st leg	Sevilla (Spain)	2–2	(Ukraine) Shakhtar Donetsk	Seville, Spain
21:45 EET (UTC+2)	Martí 8' (pen.) (yellow card) 36'; Navas (yellow card) 17'; Fabiano (yellow card) 70'; Maresca 88' (pen.)	Report	Hübschman 19'; Duljaj (yellow card) 21'; Brandão (yellow card) 40'; Matuzalém (yellow card) 52' (goal) 60' (pen.); Srna (yellow card) 52'	Stadium: Ramón Sánchez-Pizjuán Stadium; Attendance: 34,500; Referee: Viktor Kassai (Hungary)

15 March 2007 Round of 16 2nd leg	Shakhtar Donetsk (Ukraine)	2–3 (a.e.t.) (4–5 agg.)	(Spain) Sevilla	Donetsk, Ukraine
20:30 EET (UTC+2)	Byelik (yellow card) 20'; Matuzalém 49'; Elano 83'; Lewandowski (yellow card) 89'	Report	Navarro (yellow card) 36'; Fabiano (yellow card) 42'; Maresca 53'; Dragutinović (yellow card) 90+1'; Palop 90+4'; Poulsen (yellow card) 98'; Chevantón 105'; Escudé (yellow card) 115'	Stadium: RSC Olimpiyskiy; Attendance: 25,500; Referee: Gianluca Paparesta (Italy)

== Squad statistics ==
As of match played 17 June 2007

=== Appearances and goals ===
No.	Pos	Nat	Player	Total		Vyshcha Liha		Ukrainian Cup		Supercup		UEFA Champions League		UEFA Cup	
No.	Pos	Nat	Player	Apps	Goals	Apps	Goals	Apps	Goals	Apps	Goals	Apps	Goals	Apps	Goals
3	DF	(Czech Republic) CZE	Tomáš Hübschman	29	1	17	0	4	0	1	0	5+1	0	1	1
5	DF	(Ukraine) UKR	Oleksandr Kucher	23	1	14	0	4	1	0	0	2	0	3	0
6	MF	(Serbia and Montenegro) SCG	Igor Duljaj	32	1	20	1	4	0	0+1	0	2+2	0	1+2	0
7	MF	(Brazil) BRA	Fernandinho	40	4	25	1	3	0	1	0	7	2	4	1
9	MF	(Brazil) BRA	Matuzalém	31	12	16	7	3	1	1	0	7	2	4	2
10	MF	(Serbia and Montenegro) SCG	Zvonimir Vukić	16	4	13	2	3	2	0	0	0	0	0	0
11	FW	(Ukraine) UKR	Andriy Vorobey	26	3	16	2	4+2	1	0	0	0+3	0	0+1	0
12	GK	(Ukraine) UKR	Dmytro Shutkov	13	0	8	0	2	0	0	0	3	0	0	0
13	DF	(Ukraine) UKR	Vyacheslav Shevchuk	23	0	14	0	4	0	0+1	0	0	0	4	0
17	FW	(Brazil) BRA	Luiz Adriano	6	0	5	0	1	0	0	0	0	0	0	0
18	DF	(Poland) POL	Mariusz Lewandowski	29	4	18	4	4	0	0	0	5	0	2	0
19	MF	(Ukraine) UKR	Oleksiy Hai	29	1	18	1	4+2	0	0	0	0+2	0	1+2	0
20	FW	(Ukraine) UKR	Oleksiy Byelik	29	10	21	7	2+2	3	0	0	0+1	0	3	0
22	MF	(Ukraine) UKR	Maksym Trusevych	2	0	2	0	0	0	0	0	0	0	0	0
25	FW	(Brazil) BRA	Brandão	36	10	20	9	3+2	1	1	0	7+1	0	2	0
26	DF	(Romania) ROU	Răzvan Raț	27	0	14	0	3	0	1	0	8	0	0+1	0
27	DF	(Ukraine) UKR	Dmytro Chyhrynskyi	29	1	17	0	4	1	0	0	4	0	4	0
28	DF	(Ukraine) UKR	Oleksiy Polyanskyi	5	0	5	0	0	0	0	0	0	0	0	0
29	FW	(Romania) ROU	Ciprian Marica	37	10	23	6	1+1	0	1	0	6+2	4	3	0
33	DF	(Croatia) CRO	Darijo Srna	35	4	20	3	3+2	0	1	0	6	0	3	1
35	GK	(Ukraine) UKR	Yuriy Virt	3	0	2	0	1	0	0	0	0	0	0	0
35	GK	(Ukraine) UKR	Bohdan Shust	24	0	14	0	2	0	0	0	4	0	4	0
36	MF	(Brazil) BRA	Elano	23	8	11	5	1+1	1	1	0	4+2	1	2+1	1
38	MF	(Brazil) BRA	Jádson	39	5	22	3	3+1	1	0+1	0	4+4	1	2+2	0
	GK	(Ukraine) UKR	Oleksandr Kupalnyi	1	0	1	0	0	0	0	0	0	0	0	0
	DF	(Ukraine) UKR	Maxim Kosarev	1	0	1	0	0	0	0	0	0	0	0	0
	DF	(Ukraine) UKR	Ihor Oshchypko	1	0	1	0	0	0	0	0	0	0	0	0
	DF	(Ukraine) UKR	Oleh Yermak	1	0	0	0	0+1	0	0	0	0	0	0	0
	MF	(Ukraine) UKR	Denys Kozhanov	1	0	1	0	0	0	0	0	0	0	0	0
	MF	(Ukraine) UKR	Oleksandr Miroshnychenko	1	0	0	0	0+1	0	0	0	0	0	0	0
	MF	(Ukraine) UKR	Stanislav Mykytsey	1	0	1	0	0	0	0	0	0	0	0	0
	MF	(Ukraine) UKR	Vadym Shavrin	1	0	1	0	0	0	0	0	0	0	0	0
	MF	(Ukraine) UKR	Serhiy Shevchuk	2	0	1	0	0+1	0	0	0	0	0	0	0
	MF	(Ukraine) UKR	Andriy Shybko	1	0	1	0	0	0	0	0	0	0	0	0
	MF	(Ukraine) UKR	Platon Svyrydov	1	0	1	0	0	0	0	0	0	0	0	0
	FW	(Ukraine) UKR	Vladyslav Holopyorov	1	0	0	0	0+1	0	0	0	0	0	0	0
Players away on loan:
8	DF	(Brazil) BRA	Leonardo	15	0	10	0	2+1	0	1	0	1	0	0	0
16	GK	(Czech Republic) CZE	Jan Laštůvka	3	0	2	0	0	0	1	0	0	0	0	0
32	DF	(Ukraine) UKR	Vyacheslav Sviderskyi	6	0	3	0	1	0	0	0	2	0	0	0
37	MF	(Ukraine) UKR	Serhiy Tkachenko	8	0	5	0	3	0	0	0	0	0	0	0
Players who left Shakhtar Donetsk during the season:
1	GK	(Croatia) CRO	Stipe Pletikosa	6	0	3	0	2	0	0	0	1	0	0	0
4	MF	(Ukraine) UKR	Anatoliy Tymoshchuk	26	2	15	1	2	1	1	0	7	0	1	0
15	FW	(Nigeria) NGA	Emmanuel Okoduwa	8	4	3	0	4	4	0	0	0+1	0	0	0
17	FW	(Nigeria) NGA	Julius Aghahowa	18	3	9	3	0+1	0	0+1	0	3+4	0	0	0

=== Goalscorers ===
Place	Position	Nation	Number	Name	Vyshcha Liha	Ukrainian Cup	Super Cup	UEFA Champions League	UEFA Cup	Total
1	FW	(Brazil)	21	Matuzalém	7	1	0	2	2	12
2	FW	(Brazil)	21	Brandão	9	1	0	0	0	10
2	FW	(Ukraine)	21	Oleksiy Byelik	7	3	0	0	0	10
2	FW	(Romania)	21	Ciprian Marica	6	0	0	4	0	10
5	MF	(Brazil)	21	Elano	5	1	0	1	1	8
6	MF	(Brazil)	21	Jádson	3	1	0	1	0	5
7	DF	(Poland)	21	Mariusz Lewandowski	4	0	0	0	0	4
7	DF	(Croatia)	21	Darijo Srna	3	0	0	0	1	4
7	MF	(Serbia)	21	Zvonimir Vukić	2	2	0	0	0	4
7	MF	(Brazil)	21	Fernandinho	1	0	0	2	1	4
7	FW	(Nigeria)	15	Emmanuel Okoduwa	0	4	0	0	0	4
12	FW	(Nigeria)	21	Julius Aghahowa	3	0	0	0	0	3
12	FW	(Ukraine)	21	Andriy Vorobey	2	1	0	0	0	3
12				Own goal	2	1	0	0	0	3
15	MF	(Ukraine)	21	Anatoliy Tymoshchuk	1	1	0	0	0	2
16	MF	(Ukraine)	21	Oleksiy Hai	1	0	0	0	0	1
16	MF	(Serbia)	21	Igor Duljaj	1	0	0	0	0	1
16	DF	(Ukraine)	21	Oleksandr Kucher	0	1	0	0	0	1
16	DF	(Ukraine)	21	Dmytro Chyhrynskyi	0	1	0	0	0	1
16	DF	(Czech Republic)	21	Tomáš Hübschman	0	0	0	0	1	1
TOTALS					57	18	0	10	6	0

=== Clean sheets ===
Place	Position	Nation	Number	Name	Vyshcha Liha	Ukrainian Cup	Super Cup	UEFA Champions League	UEFA Cup	Total
1	GK	(Ukraine)	35	Bohdan Shust	9	1	0	1	1	12
2	GK	(Ukraine)	12	Dmytro Shutkov	3	0	0	1	0	4
3	GK	(Croatia)	1	Stipe Pletikosa	1	1	0	0	0	2
3	GK	(Ukraine)	35	Yuriy Virt	1	1	0	0	0	2
5	GK	(Czech Republic)	16	Jan Laštůvka	1	0	0	0	0	1
TOTALS					15	3	0	2	1	21

=== Disciplinary record ===
Number	Nation	Position	Name	Vyshcha Liha		Ukrainian Cup		Super Cup		Champions League		UEFA Cup		Total	
Number	Nation	Position	Name	Booked	Sent off (straight red)	Booked	Sent off (straight red)	Booked	Sent off (straight red)	Booked	Sent off (straight red)	Booked	Sent off (straight red)	Booked	Sent off (straight red)
3	(Czech Republic)	DF	Tomáš Hübschman	5	1	2	0	0	0	3	0	0	0	10	1
4	(Ukraine)	MF	Anatoliy Tymoshchuk	1	0	0	0	0	0	3	0	2	1	6	1
5	(Ukraine)	DF	Oleksandr Kucher	6	0	0	0	0	0	1	0	2	0	9	0
6	(Serbia and Montenegro)	MF	Igor Duljaj	4	0	0	0	0	0	0	0	1	0	5	0
7	(Brazil)	MF	Fernandinho	8	0	1	0	1	0	2	0	2	0	14	0
8	(Brazil)	DF	Leonardo	0	0	1	0	0	0	0	0	0	0	1	0
9	(Brazil)	MF	Matuzalém	4	0	1	0	0	0	2	0	1	0	8	0
11	(Ukraine)	FW	Andriy Vorobey	1	0	0	0	0	0	0	0	0	0	1	0
13	(Ukraine)	DF	Vyacheslav Shevchuk	3	0	1	0	0	0	0	0	0	0	4	0
18	(Poland)	DF	Mariusz Lewandowski	3	0	0	0	0	0	2	0	2	0	7	0
19	(Ukraine)	MF	Oleksiy Hai	3	1	1	0	0	0	0	0	0	0	4	1
20	(Ukraine)	FW	Oleksiy Byelik	4	0	1	0	0	0	0	0	1	0	6	0
25	(Brazil)	FW	Brandão	7	0	1	0	1	0	3	0	2	0	14	0
26	(Romania)	DF	Răzvan Raț	3	0	1	0	0	0	2	1	0	0	6	1
27	(Ukraine)	DF	Dmytro Chyhrynskyi	2	1	1	0	0	0	0	0	0	0	3	1
28	(Ukraine)	DF	Oleksiy Polyanskyi	1	0	0	0	0	0	0	0	0	0	1	0
29	(Romania)	FW	Ciprian Marica	4	0	0	0	0	0	2	0	1	0	7	0
32	(Ukraine)	DF	Vyacheslav Sviderskyi	1	0	0	0	0	0	2	1	0	0	3	1
33	(Croatia)	DF	Darijo Srna	5	1	3	0	0	0	1	0	2	0	11	1
35	(Ukraine)	GK	Bohdan Shust	1	0	0	0	0	0	1	0	0	0	2	0
36	(Brazil)	MF	Elano	3	0	1	0	0	0	1	0	0	0	5	0
38	(Brazil)	MF	Jádson	4	1	1	0	0	0	0	0	0	0	5	1
Players away on loan:
10	(Serbia and Montenegro)	MF	Zvonimir Vukić	1	1	1	0	0	0	0	0	0	0	2	1
Players who left Shakhtar Donetsk during the season:
17	(Nigeria)	FW	Julius Aghahowa	1	0	0	0	0	0	0	0	0	0	1	0
			TOTALS	75	6	17	0	2	0	25	2	16	1	135	9
