= List of Ukrainian football transfers summer 2009 =

This is a list of Ukrainian football transfers in the summer transfer window 2009 by club. Only transfers of the Premier League, 1st League and 2nd League are included.

== Premier League ==
=== FC Arsenal Kyiv ===
In: Note: Flags indicate national team as defined under FIFA eligibility rules; some limited exceptions apply. Players may hold more than one non-FIFA nationality.

No.	Pos.	Nation	Player
—	FW	(Ukraine) UKR	Andriy Vorobei (from FC Dnipro Dnipropetrovsk)
—	MF	(Belarus) BLR	Aljaksandr Danilov (from FC Metalurh Donetsk)
--	MF	(Lithuania) LTU	Saulius Mikoliūnas (from Hearts)
--	GK	(Ukraine) UKR	Nikolai Voroniuk
3	DF	(Ukraine) UKR	Taras Ilnytskyy (from Tavriya Simferopol)
--	DF	(Ukraine) UKR	Oleksandr Romanchuk (on loan from Dynamo Kyiv)

Out: Note: Flags indicate national team as defined under FIFA eligibility rules; some limited exceptions apply. Players may hold more than one non-FIFA nationality.

No.	Pos.	Nation	Player
10	FW	(Ukraine) UKR	Volodymyr Lysenko (loan return to FC Dynamo Kyiv)
—	DF	(Spain) ESP	Daniel Fernández Artola (to Feyenoord)
14	FW	(Ukraine) UKR	Vadym Rybalchenko (to Volyn)
17	GK	(Ukraine) UKR	Vadym Deonas (released)
6	MF	(Belarus) BLR	Syarhey Kuznyatsow (to Granit Mikashevichi)
—	FW	(Netherlands Antilles) ANT	Bito (on loan to Zakarpattia)

=== FC Chornomorets Odesa ===
In: Note: Flags indicate national team as defined under FIFA eligibility rules; some limited exceptions apply. Players may hold more than one non-FIFA nationality.

No.	Pos.	Nation	Player
7	MF	(Montenegro) MNE	Mirko Raičević (from Zorya Luhansk)
—	MF	(Uruguay) URU	Sebastián Vázquez (loan return from Liverpool de Montevideo)
—	MF	(Ukraine) UKR	Artem Kasyanov (free agent)

Out: Note: Flags indicate national team as defined under FIFA eligibility rules; some limited exceptions apply. Players may hold more than one non-FIFA nationality.

No.	Pos.	Nation	Player
23	MF	(Serbia) SRB	Aleksandar Trišović (loan return to FC Metalist Kharkiv)
77	FW	(Georgia (country)) GEO	Irakli Modebadze (free agent)
—	MF	(Ukraine) UKR	Yevhen Lutsenko (to Tavriya)

=== FC Dnipro Dnipropetrovsk ===
In: Note: Flags indicate national team as defined under FIFA eligibility rules; some limited exceptions apply. Players may hold more than one non-FIFA nationality.

No.	Pos.	Nation	Player
14	DF	(Ukraine) UKR	Evgen Cheberyachko (from FC Kharkiv)
10	FW	(Ukraine) UKR	Evhen Seleznyov (from Shakhtar Donetsk)
99	FW	(Mexico) MEX	Nery Castillo (on loan from Shakhtar Donetsk)

Out: Note: Flags indicate national team as defined under FIFA eligibility rules; some limited exceptions apply. Players may hold more than one non-FIFA nationality.

No.	Pos.	Nation	Player
—	FW	(Ukraine) UKR	Andriy Vorobei (to FC Arsenal Kyiv)
17	MF	(Georgia (country)) GEO	Aleqsandr Kobakhidze (loan to FC Kryvbas Kryvyi Rih)
—	MF	(Ukraine) UKR	Oleh Shelayev (to FC Metalist Kharkiv)
—	DF	(Ukraine) UKR	Oleksandr Radchenko (free agent)
—	MF	(Ukraine) UKR	Kostyantyn Balabanov (free agent)
—	MF	(Ukraine) UKR	Vyacheslav Serdyuk (loan to FC Kryvbas Kryvyi Rih)
22	MF	(Croatia) CRO	Mladen Bartulović (on loan to Kryvbas)
23	GK	(Ukraine) UKR	Vyacheslav Kernozenko (on loan to FC Kryvbas Kryvyi Rih)

=== FC Dynamo Kyiv ===
In: Note: Flags indicate national team as defined under FIFA eligibility rules; some limited exceptions apply. Players may hold more than one non-FIFA nationality.

No.	Pos.	Nation	Player
10	FW	(Ukraine) UKR	Volodymyr Lysenko (loan return from FC Arsenal Kyiv)
18	FW	(Latvia) LVA	Maris Verpakovskis (loan return from Celta de Vigo)
TBD	DF	(Brazil) BRA	Leandro Almeida (from Atletico Mineiro)
TBD	MF	(Ukraine) UKR	Andriy Oberemko (loan return from Illichivets)
7	FW	(Ukraine) UKR	Andriy Shevchenko (from Chelsea)

Out: Note: Flags indicate national team as defined under FIFA eligibility rules; some limited exceptions apply. Players may hold more than one non-FIFA nationality.

No.	Pos.	Nation	Player
23	DF	(Ukraine) UKR	Oleksandr Romanchuk (on loan to Arsenal Kyiv)
19	MF	(Romania) ROU	Florin Cernat (signed with Hajduk Split)
16	FW	(Uzbekistan) UZB	Maksim Shatskikh (to FC Lokomotiv Astana)
32	DF	(Georgia (country)) GEO	Malkhaz Asatiani (loan return to Lokomotiv Moscow)
10	FW	(Guinea) GUI	Ismaël Bangoura (sold to Stade Rennais F.C.)
18	FW	(Latvia) LVA	Maris Verpakovskis (on loan to Ergotelis F.C.)
—	FW	(Ukraine) UKR	Volodymyr Lysenko (to Metalist Kharkiv)
--	GK	(Ukraine) UKR	Denys Boyko (on loan to Obolon)
--	DF	(Ukraine) UKR	Andriy Fartushnyak (on loan to Obolon)
--	MF	(Ukraine) UKR	Mykola Morozyuk (on loan to Obolon)
--	FW	(Belarus) BLR	Andrey Varankov (on loan to Obolon)
TBD	DF	(France) FRA	Marc Fachan (to AJ Auxerre)
77	FW	(Brazil) BRA	Guilherme (on loan to CSKA)

=== FC Illichivets Mariupol ===
In: Note: Flags indicate national team as defined under FIFA eligibility rules; some limited exceptions apply. Players may hold more than one non-FIFA nationality.

No.	Pos.	Nation	Player
1	GK	(Ukraine) UKR	Vsevolod Romanenko (from Karpaty Lviv)
—	MF	(Ukraine) UKR	Konstantyn Yaroshenko (loan from FC Shakhtar Donetsk)
5	MF	(Ukraine) UKR	Adrian Pukanych (from Shakhtar Donetsk)
12	GK	(Ukraine) UKR	Oleh Ostapenko (from FC Banants)
27	FW	(Ukraine) UKR	Oleksandr Kasyan (on loan from Shakhtar)
2	DF	(Ukraine) UKR	Stanyslav Mykitsey (on loan from Shakhtar)

Out: Note: Flags indicate national team as defined under FIFA eligibility rules; some limited exceptions apply. Players may hold more than one non-FIFA nationality.

No.	Pos.	Nation	Player
—	GK	(Ukraine) UKR	Ihor Shukhovtsev (to FC Zorya Luhansk)
42	GK	(Ukraine) UKR	Andriy Tovt (left club)
42	GK	(Ukraine) UKR	Denys Ershov (broke contract)
TBD		(Ukraine) UKR	Andriy Oberemko (loan return to Dynamo Kyiv)

=== FC Karpaty Lviv ===
In: Note: Flags indicate national team as defined under FIFA eligibility rules; some limited exceptions apply. Players may hold more than one non-FIFA nationality.

No.	Pos.	Nation	Player
20	MF	(Nigeria) NGA	Samson Godwin (loan return from FC Shakhter Karagandy)
22	GK	(Ukraine) UKR	Andriy Tlumak (from Zorya)
44	DF	(Ukraine) UKR	Artem Fedetskiy (on 2 year loan from Shakhtar Donetsk)
30	FW	(Brazil) BRA	William Batista (from FK Baku)
—	DF	(Bolivia) BOL	Miguel Hoyos (from Club Bolívar)

Out: Note: Flags indicate national team as defined under FIFA eligibility rules; some limited exceptions apply. Players may hold more than one non-FIFA nationality.

No.	Pos.	Nation	Player
1	GK	(Ukraine) UKR	Vsevolod Romanenko (to FC Illychivets Mariupol)
19	MF	(Ukraine) UKR	Vasyl Kobin (to Shakhtar Donetsk)

=== FC Kryvbas Kryvyi Rih ===
In: Note: Flags indicate national team as defined under FIFA eligibility rules; some limited exceptions apply. Players may hold more than one non-FIFA nationality.

No.	Pos.	Nation	Player
—	MF	(Georgia (country)) GEO	Aleqsandr Kobakhidze (loan from FC Dnipro Dnipropetrovsk)
—	MF	(Ukraine) UKR	Vyacheslav Serdyuk (loan from FC Dnipro Dnipropetrovsk)
11	FW	(Ukraine) UKR	Yuriy Shturko (from Dniester)
--	MF	(Ukraine) UKR	Platon Svyrydov (from Feniks-Illichovets)
5	DF	(Ukraine) UKR	Vitaliy Komarnitskyy (from FC Kharkiv)
—	MF	(Lithuania) LTU	Kęstutis Ivaškevičius (from FBK Kaunas)
22	MF	(Croatia) CRO	Mladen Bartulović (on loan from Dnipro)
32	GK	(Ukraine) UKR	Vyacheslav Kernozenko (on loan to Dnipro)

Out: Note: Flags indicate national team as defined under FIFA eligibility rules; some limited exceptions apply. Players may hold more than one non-FIFA nationality.

No.	Pos.	Nation	Player
33	DF	(Cameroon) CMR	Patrick Ibanda (to FC Feniks-Illychovets Kalinine)
7	MF	(Ukraine) UKR	Oleh Shelayev (free agent)
9	FW	(Ukraine) UKR	Kostantyn Balabanov (free agent)
14	DF	(Ukraine) UKR	Oleksandr Radchenko (free agent)
1	GK	(Ukraine) UKR	Artem Kusliy (free agent)

=== FC Metalist Kharkiv ===
In: Note: Flags indicate national team as defined under FIFA eligibility rules; some limited exceptions apply. Players may hold more than one non-FIFA nationality.

No.	Pos.	Nation	Player
28	DF	(Ukraine) UKR	Oleksiy Kurylov (loan return from FC Zorya Luhansk)
9	FW	(Ukraine) UKR	Oleksiy Antonov (loan return form Zorya)
23	MF	(Serbia) SRB	Aleksandar Trišović (loan return from FC Chornomorets Odesa)
—	MF	(Ukraine) UKR	Oleh Shelayev (free agent)
—	MF	(Argentina) ARG	Hernán Fredes (from Independiente)
—	FW	(Ukraine) UKR	Volodymyr Lysenko (from Dynamo Kyiv)
--	FW	(Finland) FIN	Alexei Eremenko (Saturn)
--	FW	(Georgia (country)) GEO	Vakhtang Pantskhava (on loan from Le Mans)

Out: Note: Flags indicate national team as defined under FIFA eligibility rules; some limited exceptions apply. Players may hold more than one non-FIFA nationality.

No.	Pos.	Nation	Player
2	DF	(Ukraine) UKR	Andriy Koniushenko (free agent)
21	DF	(Ukraine) UKR	Dmytro Semochko (free agent)
28	MF	(Ukraine) UKR	Roman Butenko (free agent)
—	DF	(Ukraine) UKR	Oleksiy Kurylov (on loan to Zorya Luhansk)
—	FW	(Ukraine) UKR	Oleksiy Antonov (on loan to Zorya Luhansk)
32	MF	(Argentina) ARG	Walter Acevedo (to Independiente)

=== FC Metalurh Donetsk ===
In: Note: Flags indicate national team as defined under FIFA eligibility rules; some limited exceptions apply. Players may hold more than one non-FIFA nationality.

No.	Pos.	Nation	Player
25	DF	(Ukraine) UKR	Oleksandr Zhdanov (from FC Lviv)
27	MF	(Ukraine) UKR	Olexiy Hodin (from FC Metalurh Zaporizhzhia)
1	GK	(Ukraine) UKR	Bohdan Shust (loan from FC Shakhtar Donetsk)
—	DF	(Ukraine) UKR	Ihor Korotetskyy (on loan from Shakhtar Donetsk)
—	FW	(Zimbabwe) ZIM	Musawengosi Mguni (from Al-Shabab)
22	MF	(Armenia) ARM	Henrik Mkhitaryan (from Pyunik)
—	MF	(Ukraine) UKR	Oleksandr Oliynyk (from Dacia)

Out: Note: Flags indicate national team as defined under FIFA eligibility rules; some limited exceptions apply. Players may hold more than one non-FIFA nationality.

No.	Pos.	Nation	Player
—	MF	(Belarus) BLR	Aljaksandr Danilov (to FC Arsenal Kyiv)
37	FW	(Ukraine) UKR	Oleksandr Sytnyk
—	MF	(Portugal) POR	Ricardo Fernandes (to Anorthosis)
3	MF	(Ukraine) UKR	Oleksandr Zotov (free agent)
11	MF	(Belarus) BLR	Vladimir Karytska

=== FC Metalurh Zaporizhzhia ===
In: Note: Flags indicate national team as defined under FIFA eligibility rules; some limited exceptions apply. Players may hold more than one non-FIFA nationality.

No.	Pos.	Nation	Player
—	FW	(Moldova) MDA	Igor Bugaiov (from Academia UTM)
33	MF	(Ukraine) UKR	Maksym Bilyy (on loan from FC Kharkiv)
—	MF	(Lithuania) LTU	Darius Miceika (from Granit Mikashevichi)
15	MF	(South Korea) KOR	Kim Pyungrae (from Chung-Ang University)

Chung-Ang University

Out: Note: Flags indicate national team as defined under FIFA eligibility rules; some limited exceptions apply. Players may hold more than one non-FIFA nationality.

No.	Pos.	Nation	Player
2	DF	(Bosnia and Herzegovina) BIH	Nikola Vasiljevic (free agent)
40	MF	(Ukraine) UKR	Roman Lutsenko (free agent)
27	MF	(Ukraine) UKR	Olexiy Hodin (to FC Metalurh Donetsk)
6	MF	(Serbia) SRB	Dragan Perišić (free agent)

=== FC Obolon Kyiv ===
In: Note: Flags indicate national team as defined under FIFA eligibility rules; some limited exceptions apply. Players may hold more than one non-FIFA nationality.

No.	Pos.	Nation	Player
--	GK	(Ukraine) UKR	Denys Boyko (on loan from Dynamo Kyiv)
--	DF	(Ukraine) UKR	Andriy Fartushnyak (on loan from Dynamo Kyiv)
--	MF	(Ukraine) UKR	Mykola Morozyuk (on loan from Dynamo Kyiv)
--	FW	(Belarus) BLR	Andrey Varankov (on loan from Dynamo Kyiv)

Out: Note: Flags indicate national team as defined under FIFA eligibility rules; some limited exceptions apply. Players may hold more than one non-FIFA nationality.

No.	Pos.	Nation	Player

=== FC Shakhtar Donetsk ===
In: Note: Flags indicate national team as defined under FIFA eligibility rules; some limited exceptions apply. Players may hold more than one non-FIFA nationality.

No.	Pos.	Nation	Player
9	MF	(Ukraine) UKR	Constantyn Yaroshenko (loan return from FC Vorskla Poltava)
14	MF	(Ukraine) UKR	Vasyl Kobin (from Karpaty Lviv)
—	FW	(Nigeria) NGA	Julius Aghahowa (from Kayserispor as free agent)

Out: Note: Flags indicate national team as defined under FIFA eligibility rules; some limited exceptions apply. Players may hold more than one non-FIFA nationality.

No.	Pos.	Nation	Player
99	FW	(Bolivia) BOL	Marcelo Moreno (1 year loan to Werder Bremen starting July 2, 2009)
1	GK	(Ukraine) UKR	Bohdan Shust (loan to FC Metalurh Donetsk)
—	DF	(Ukraine) UKR	Ihor Korotetskyy (on loan to Metalurh Donetsk)
44	DF	(Ukraine) UKR	Artem Fedetskiy (on 2 year loan to Karpaty Lviv)
2	MF	(Ukraine) UKR	Adrian Pukanych (to FC Illichivets Mariupol)
—	FW	(Ukraine) UKR	Oleksandr Kasian (on loan to FC Illichivets Mariupol)
—	DF	(Ukraine) UKR	Stanyslav Mykitsey (on loan to FC Illichivets Mariupol)
10	FW	(Ukraine) UKR	Evhen Seleznyov (to Dnipro)
9	FW	(Mexico) MEX	Nery Castillo (on loan to FC Dnipro)

=== SC Tavriya Simferopol ===
In: Note: Flags indicate national team as defined under FIFA eligibility rules; some limited exceptions apply. Players may hold more than one non-FIFA nationality.

No.	Pos.	Nation	Player
—	MF	(Ukraine) UKR	Yevhen Lutsenko (from Chornomorets)
20	FW	(Ukraine) UKR	Ruslan Platon (from FC Kharkiv)
32	GK	(Ukraine) UKR	Dmytro Stoyko (from FC Kharkiv)
3	DF	(Ukraine) UKR	Ihor Buryak

Out: Note: Flags indicate national team as defined under FIFA eligibility rules; some limited exceptions apply. Players may hold more than one non-FIFA nationality.

No.	Pos.	Nation	Player
23	FW	(Ukraine) UKR	Oleksandr Artemenko (on loan to Zakarpattia)
24	MF	(Georgia (country)) GEO	Vladimir Burduli (on loan to Zakarpattia)
4	DF	(Ukraine) UKR	Andriy Donets' (loan to FC Zakarpattia Uzhhorod)
8	MF	(Ukraine) UKR	Yevhenniy Shmakov (loan to FC Zakarpattia Uzhhorod)
25	GK	(Lithuania) LTU	Marius Rapalis (free agent)
21	DF	(Ukraine) UKR	Taras Ilnytskyy (free agent, to Arsenal Kyiv)
—	DF	(Serbia) SRB	Miloš Živković (free agent)
6	MF	(Ukraine) UKR	Alexandr Kazanyuk (free agent)
5	DF	(Romania) ROU	Lucian Dobre (free agent)
72	GK	(Ukraine) UKR	Ihor Lytovka (loan return to PFC Sevastopol)
3	DF	(Lithuania) LTU	Vidas Alunderis (to LASK Linz)

=== FC Vorskla Poltava ===
In: Note: Flags indicate national team as defined under FIFA eligibility rules; some limited exceptions apply. Players may hold more than one non-FIFA nationality.

No.	Pos.	Nation	Player

Out: Note: Flags indicate national team as defined under FIFA eligibility rules; some limited exceptions apply. Players may hold more than one non-FIFA nationality.

No.	Pos.	Nation	Player
9	MF	(Ukraine) UKR	Constantyn Yaroshenko (loan return to FC Shakhtar Donetsk)
11	FW	(Croatia) CRO	Denis Glavina (1 year loan to Dinamo Zagreb)

=== FC Zorya Luhansk ===
In: Note: Flags indicate national team as defined under FIFA eligibility rules; some limited exceptions apply. Players may hold more than one non-FIFA nationality.

No.	Pos.	Nation	Player
13	DF	(Ukraine) UKR	Serhiy Siminin (from FC Zakarpattia Uzhhorod)
—	MF	(Ukraine) UKR	Oleksandr Yanchenko (from FC Helios Kharkiv)
—	GK	(Ukraine) UKR	Ihor Shukhovtsev (from Illichivets)
28	DF	(Ukraine) UKR	Oleksiy Kurylov (on loan from Metalist Kharkiv)
9	FW	(Ukraine) UKR	Oleksiy Antonov (on loan from Metalist Kharkiv)
22	MF	(Ukraine) UKR	Vadym Milko (from FC Kharkiv)

Out: Note: Flags indicate national team as defined under FIFA eligibility rules; some limited exceptions apply. Players may hold more than one non-FIFA nationality.

No.	Pos.	Nation	Player
4	DF	(Nigeria) NGA	Harrison Omoko
20	FW	(Cameroon) CMR	Stephane Jules Baga
28	DF	(Ukraine) UKR	Oleksiy Kurylov (loan return to FC Metalist Kharkiv)
9	FW	(Ukraine) UKR	Oleksiy Antonov (loan return to Metalist)
7	MF	(Montenegro) MNE	Mirko Raičević (free agent)
5	DF	(Ukraine) UKR	Taras Duray (loan return to FC Nyva Ternopil)
18	MF	(Brazil) BRA	Junior Godoi (free agent)
22	GK	(Ukraine) UKR	Andriy Tlumak (to Karpaty)
23	DF	(Moldova) MDA	Vadym Bolokhan (to Zakarpattia)
27	MF	(Argentina) ARG	Ruben Gomez (free agent, to Zakarpattia Uzhorod)
10	DF	(Georgia (country)) GEO	Georgi Tsimakuridze (to MŠK Žilina)

=== FC Zakarpattia Uzhhorod ===
In: Note: Flags indicate national team as defined under FIFA eligibility rules; some limited exceptions apply. Players may hold more than one non-FIFA nationality.

No.	Pos.	Nation	Player
—	GK	(Ukraine) UKR	Andriy Mykhaylov (from CSKA Kyiv)
--	DF	(Ukraine) UKR	Ivan Kozoriz (from FC Kharkiv)
4	DF	(Ukraine) UKR	Andriy Donets' (loan from SC Tavriya Simferopol)
23	MF	(Ukraine) UKR	Oleksandr Artemenko (on loan from SC Tavriya Simferopol)
24	MF	(Georgia (country)) GEO	Vladimir Burduli (on loan from SC Tavriya Simferopol)
23	DF	(Moldova) MDA	Vadym Bolokhan (from Zorya)
—	MF	(Lithuania) LTU	Aurimas Kučys (from FC Naftovyk-Ukrnafta Okhtyrka)
—	FW	(Ukraine) UKR	Taras Kabanov (from Metalurh Zaporizhzhia)
—	FW	(Ukraine) UKR	Andriy Koval (from Metalist Kharkiv)
—	FW	(Ukraine) UKR	Pavlo Ksyonz (on loan from Dynamo Kyiv)
--	FW	(Russia) RUS	Sergei Ryzhikh (from Metallug Lipetsk)
--	MF	(Argentina) ARG	Ruben Gomez (from Zorya Lunansk)
—	FW	(Netherlands Antilles) ANT	Bito (on loan from Arsenal Kyiv)

Out: Note: Flags indicate national team as defined under FIFA eligibility rules; some limited exceptions apply. Players may hold more than one non-FIFA nationality.

No.	Pos.	Nation	Player
20	FW	(Nigeria) NGA	Eddy Dombraye (to FC Feniks-Illychovets Kalinine)
13	DF	(Ukraine) UKR	Serhiy Siminin (to FC Zorya Luhansk)
--	FW	(Ukraine) UKR	Taras Kabanov (to FC Volyn Lutsk)

== First League ==
=== FC Desna Chernihiv ===
In: Note: Flags indicate national team as defined under FIFA eligibility rules; some limited exceptions apply. Players may hold more than one non-FIFA nationality.

No.	Pos.	Nation	Player

Out: Note: Flags indicate national team as defined under FIFA eligibility rules; some limited exceptions apply. Players may hold more than one non-FIFA nationality.

No.	Pos.	Nation	Player

=== FC Dniester Ovidiopol ===
In: Note: Flags indicate national team as defined under FIFA eligibility rules; some limited exceptions apply. Players may hold more than one non-FIFA nationality.

No.	Pos.	Nation	Player

Out: Note: Flags indicate national team as defined under FIFA eligibility rules; some limited exceptions apply. Players may hold more than one non-FIFA nationality.

No.	Pos.	Nation	Player
—	FW	(Ukraine) UKR	Oleh Pidleteychuk
11	FW	(Ukraine) UKR	Yuriy Shturko (to Kryvbas)

=== FC Dynamo-2 Kyiv ===
In: Note: Flags indicate national team as defined under FIFA eligibility rules; some limited exceptions apply. Players may hold more than one non-FIFA nationality.

No.	Pos.	Nation	Player

Out: Note: Flags indicate national team as defined under FIFA eligibility rules; some limited exceptions apply. Players may hold more than one non-FIFA nationality.

No.	Pos.	Nation	Player

=== FC Enerhetyk Burshtyn ===
In: Note: Flags indicate national team as defined under FIFA eligibility rules; some limited exceptions apply. Players may hold more than one non-FIFA nationality.

No.	Pos.	Nation	Player

Out: Note: Flags indicate national team as defined under FIFA eligibility rules; some limited exceptions apply. Players may hold more than one non-FIFA nationality.

No.	Pos.	Nation	Player

=== FC Feniks-Illychovets Kalinine ===
In: Note: Flags indicate national team as defined under FIFA eligibility rules; some limited exceptions apply. Players may hold more than one non-FIFA nationality.

No.	Pos.	Nation	Player
33	DF	(Cameroon) CMR	Patrick Ibanda (from FC Kryvbas Kryvyi Rih)
20	FW	(Nigeria) NGA	Eddy Dombraye (from FC Zakarpattia Uzhhorod)

Out: Note: Flags indicate national team as defined under FIFA eligibility rules; some limited exceptions apply. Players may hold more than one non-FIFA nationality.

No.	Pos.	Nation	Player
--	MF	(Ukraine) UKR	Platon Svyrydov (to Krybas)

=== FC Kharkiv ===
In: Note: Flags indicate national team as defined under FIFA eligibility rules; some limited exceptions apply. Players may hold more than one non-FIFA nationality.

No.	Pos.	Nation	Player

Out: Note: Flags indicate national team as defined under FIFA eligibility rules; some limited exceptions apply. Players may hold more than one non-FIFA nationality.

No.	Pos.	Nation	Player
14	DF	(Ukraine) UKR	Evgen Cheberyachko (to Dnipro)
—	MF	(Ukraine) UKR	Ruslan Hunchak (to Simurq)
—	FW	(Brazil) BRA	Ribeiro (to Helios Kharkiv)
6	MF	(Ukraine) UKR	Serhiy Koziuberda (to Sūduva)
5	DF	(Ukraine) UKR	Vitaliy Komarnitskyy (to Kryvbas)
—	MF	(Ukraine) UKR	Artem Kasyanov (free agent – signed with FC Chornomorets Odesa)
20	FW	(Ukraine) UKR	Ruslan Platon (to Tavriya)
32	GK	(Ukraine) UKR	Dmytro Stoyko (to Tavriya)
33	MF	(Ukraine) UKR	Maksym Bilyy (on loan to FC Metalurh Zaporizhzhia)
34	MF	(Ukraine) UKR	Vadym Milko (to Zorya)

=== FC Helios Kharkiv ===
In: Note: Flags indicate national team as defined under FIFA eligibility rules; some limited exceptions apply. Players may hold more than one non-FIFA nationality.

No.	Pos.	Nation	Player
—	DF	(Ukraine) UKR	Serhiy Borzenko (from Arsenal Kharkiv)
—	MF	(Ukraine) UKR	Vitaliy Sumtsov (from Arsenal Kharkiv)

Out: Note: Flags indicate national team as defined under FIFA eligibility rules; some limited exceptions apply. Players may hold more than one non-FIFA nationality.

No.	Pos.	Nation	Player
—	MF	(Ukraine) UKR	Oleksandr Yanchenko (to FC Zorya Luhansk)

=== FC Ihroservice Simferopol ===
In: Note: Flags indicate national team as defined under FIFA eligibility rules; some limited exceptions apply. Players may hold more than one non-FIFA nationality.

No.	Pos.	Nation	Player

Out: Note: Flags indicate national team as defined under FIFA eligibility rules; some limited exceptions apply. Players may hold more than one non-FIFA nationality.

No.	Pos.	Nation	Player

=== FC Krymteplitsia Molodizhne ===
In: Note: Flags indicate national team as defined under FIFA eligibility rules; some limited exceptions apply. Players may hold more than one non-FIFA nationality.

No.	Pos.	Nation	Player

Out: Note: Flags indicate national team as defined under FIFA eligibility rules; some limited exceptions apply. Players may hold more than one non-FIFA nationality.

No.	Pos.	Nation	Player

=== FC Lviv ===
In: Note: Flags indicate national team as defined under FIFA eligibility rules; some limited exceptions apply. Players may hold more than one non-FIFA nationality.

No.	Pos.	Nation	Player

Out: Note: Flags indicate national team as defined under FIFA eligibility rules; some limited exceptions apply. Players may hold more than one non-FIFA nationality.

No.	Pos.	Nation	Player
25	DF	(Ukraine) UKR	Oleksandr Zhdanov (to FC Metalurh Donetsk)

=== FC Naftovyk-Ukrnafta Okhtyrka ===
In: Note: Flags indicate national team as defined under FIFA eligibility rules; some limited exceptions apply. Players may hold more than one non-FIFA nationality.

No.	Pos.	Nation	Player

Out: Note: Flags indicate national team as defined under FIFA eligibility rules; some limited exceptions apply. Players may hold more than one non-FIFA nationality.

No.	Pos.	Nation	Player
15	MF	(Lithuania) LTU	Aurimas Kučys (to Zakarpattia)

=== FC Nyva Ternopil ===
In: Note: Flags indicate national team as defined under FIFA eligibility rules; some limited exceptions apply. Players may hold more than one non-FIFA nationality.

No.	Pos.	Nation	Player
5	DF	(Ukraine) UKR	Taras Duray (loan return from FC Zorya Luhansk)

Out: Note: Flags indicate national team as defined under FIFA eligibility rules; some limited exceptions apply. Players may hold more than one non-FIFA nationality.

No.	Pos.	Nation	Player

=== PFC Olexandria ===
In: Note: Flags indicate national team as defined under FIFA eligibility rules; some limited exceptions apply. Players may hold more than one non-FIFA nationality.

No.	Pos.	Nation	Player

Out: Note: Flags indicate national team as defined under FIFA eligibility rules; some limited exceptions apply. Players may hold more than one non-FIFA nationality.

No.	Pos.	Nation	Player

=== FSC Prykarpattya Ivano-Frankivsk ===
In: Note: Flags indicate national team as defined under FIFA eligibility rules; some limited exceptions apply. Players may hold more than one non-FIFA nationality.

No.	Pos.	Nation	Player

Out: Note: Flags indicate national team as defined under FIFA eligibility rules; some limited exceptions apply. Players may hold more than one non-FIFA nationality.

No.	Pos.	Nation	Player

=== PFC Sevastopol ===
In: Note: Flags indicate national team as defined under FIFA eligibility rules; some limited exceptions apply. Players may hold more than one non-FIFA nationality.

No.	Pos.	Nation	Player
72	GK	(Ukraine) UKR	Ihor Lytovka (loan return from SC Tavriya Simferopol)

Out: Note: Flags indicate national team as defined under FIFA eligibility rules; some limited exceptions apply. Players may hold more than one non-FIFA nationality.

No.	Pos.	Nation	Player

=== FC Stal Alchevsk ===
In: Note: Flags indicate national team as defined under FIFA eligibility rules; some limited exceptions apply. Players may hold more than one non-FIFA nationality.

No.	Pos.	Nation	Player

Out: Note: Flags indicate national team as defined under FIFA eligibility rules; some limited exceptions apply. Players may hold more than one non-FIFA nationality.

No.	Pos.	Nation	Player

=== FC Volyn Lutsk ===
In: Note: Flags indicate national team as defined under FIFA eligibility rules; some limited exceptions apply. Players may hold more than one non-FIFA nationality.

No.	Pos.	Nation	Player
--	GK	(Senegal) SEN	Issa Ndoye (from Zob Ahan)
--	FW	(Ukraine) UKR	Taras Kabanov (from FC Kharkiv)
17	FW	(Ukraine) UKR	Vyacheslav Sharpar (from Naftovyk)
7	FW	(Ukraine) UKR	Vadym Shavrin (from Stal Alchevsk)
--	DF	(Ukraine) UKR	Oleksandr Shevelyukhin (from FC Lviv)
--	DF	(Ukraine) UKR	Ruslan Mostovyi (from Prykarpattya)
--	DF	(Ukraine) UKR	Oleksandr Radchenko (from Kryvbas)
--	MF	(Ukraine) UKR	Serhiy Snytko (from Naftovyk)
--	DF	(Ukraine) UKR	Yevheniy Pichkur (from Desna)
--	FW	(Ukraine) UKR	Vadym Rybalchenko (from Arsenal Kyiv)

Out: Note: Flags indicate national team as defined under FIFA eligibility rules; some limited exceptions apply. Players may hold more than one non-FIFA nationality.

No.	Pos.	Nation	Player

== Ukrainian Second League ==
=== Druha A ===
==== FC Arsenal Bila Tserkva ====
In: Note: Flags indicate national team as defined under FIFA eligibility rules; some limited exceptions apply. Players may hold more than one non-FIFA nationality.

No.	Pos.	Nation	Player

Out: Note: Flags indicate national team as defined under FIFA eligibility rules; some limited exceptions apply. Players may hold more than one non-FIFA nationality.

No.	Pos.	Nation	Player

==== FC Bastion Illichivsk ====
In: Note: Flags indicate national team as defined under FIFA eligibility rules; some limited exceptions apply. Players may hold more than one non-FIFA nationality.

No.	Pos.	Nation	Player

Out: Note: Flags indicate national team as defined under FIFA eligibility rules; some limited exceptions apply. Players may hold more than one non-FIFA nationality.

No.	Pos.	Nation	Player

==== FC Bukovyna Chernivtsi ====
In: Note: Flags indicate national team as defined under FIFA eligibility rules; some limited exceptions apply. Players may hold more than one non-FIFA nationality.

No.	Pos.	Nation	Player

Out: Note: Flags indicate national team as defined under FIFA eligibility rules; some limited exceptions apply. Players may hold more than one non-FIFA nationality.

No.	Pos.	Nation	Player

==== FC CSKA Kyiv ====
In: Note: Flags indicate national team as defined under FIFA eligibility rules; some limited exceptions apply. Players may hold more than one non-FIFA nationality.

No.	Pos.	Nation	Player

Out: Note: Flags indicate national team as defined under FIFA eligibility rules; some limited exceptions apply. Players may hold more than one non-FIFA nationality.

No.	Pos.	Nation	Player

==== FC Dnipro Cherkasy ====
In: Note: Flags indicate national team as defined under FIFA eligibility rules; some limited exceptions apply. Players may hold more than one non-FIFA nationality.

No.	Pos.	Nation	Player

Out: Note: Flags indicate national team as defined under FIFA eligibility rules; some limited exceptions apply. Players may hold more than one non-FIFA nationality.

No.	Pos.	Nation	Player

==== FC Karpaty-2 Lviv ====
In: Note: Flags indicate national team as defined under FIFA eligibility rules; some limited exceptions apply. Players may hold more than one non-FIFA nationality.

No.	Pos.	Nation	Player

Out: Note: Flags indicate national team as defined under FIFA eligibility rules; some limited exceptions apply. Players may hold more than one non-FIFA nationality.

No.	Pos.	Nation	Player

==== FC Knyazha-2 Schaslyve ====
In: Note: Flags indicate national team as defined under FIFA eligibility rules; some limited exceptions apply. Players may hold more than one non-FIFA nationality.

No.	Pos.	Nation	Player

Out: Note: Flags indicate national team as defined under FIFA eligibility rules; some limited exceptions apply. Players may hold more than one non-FIFA nationality.

No.	Pos.	Nation	Player

==== FC Korosten ====
In: Note: Flags indicate national team as defined under FIFA eligibility rules; some limited exceptions apply. Players may hold more than one non-FIFA nationality.

No.	Pos.	Nation	Player

Out: Note: Flags indicate national team as defined under FIFA eligibility rules; some limited exceptions apply. Players may hold more than one non-FIFA nationality.

No.	Pos.	Nation	Player

==== MFK Mykolaiv ====
In: Note: Flags indicate national team as defined under FIFA eligibility rules; some limited exceptions apply. Players may hold more than one non-FIFA nationality.

No.	Pos.	Nation	Player

Out: Note: Flags indicate national team as defined under FIFA eligibility rules; some limited exceptions apply. Players may hold more than one non-FIFA nationality.

No.	Pos.	Nation	Player

==== FC Nafkom Brovary ====
In: Note: Flags indicate national team as defined under FIFA eligibility rules; some limited exceptions apply. Players may hold more than one non-FIFA nationality.

No.	Pos.	Nation	Player

Out: Note: Flags indicate national team as defined under FIFA eligibility rules; some limited exceptions apply. Players may hold more than one non-FIFA nationality.

No.	Pos.	Nation	Player

==== PFC Nyva Vinnytsia ====
In: Note: Flags indicate national team as defined under FIFA eligibility rules; some limited exceptions apply. Players may hold more than one non-FIFA nationality.

No.	Pos.	Nation	Player

Out: Note: Flags indicate national team as defined under FIFA eligibility rules; some limited exceptions apply. Players may hold more than one non-FIFA nationality.

No.	Pos.	Nation	Player

==== FC Obolon-2 Kyiv ====
In: Note: Flags indicate national team as defined under FIFA eligibility rules; some limited exceptions apply. Players may hold more than one non-FIFA nationality.

No.	Pos.	Nation	Player

Out: Note: Flags indicate national team as defined under FIFA eligibility rules; some limited exceptions apply. Players may hold more than one non-FIFA nationality.

No.	Pos.	Nation	Player

==== FC Podillya-Khmelnytskyi ====
In: Note: Flags indicate national team as defined under FIFA eligibility rules; some limited exceptions apply. Players may hold more than one non-FIFA nationality.

No.	Pos.	Nation	Player

Out: Note: Flags indicate national team as defined under FIFA eligibility rules; some limited exceptions apply. Players may hold more than one non-FIFA nationality.

No.	Pos.	Nation	Player

==== FC Ros' Bila Tserkva ====
In: Note: Flags indicate national team as defined under FIFA eligibility rules; some limited exceptions apply. Players may hold more than one non-FIFA nationality.

No.	Pos.	Nation	Player

Out: Note: Flags indicate national team as defined under FIFA eligibility rules; some limited exceptions apply. Players may hold more than one non-FIFA nationality.

No.	Pos.	Nation	Player

==== FC Veres Rivne ====
In: Note: Flags indicate national team as defined under FIFA eligibility rules; some limited exceptions apply. Players may hold more than one non-FIFA nationality.

No.	Pos.	Nation	Player

Out: Note: Flags indicate national team as defined under FIFA eligibility rules; some limited exceptions apply. Players may hold more than one non-FIFA nationality.

No.	Pos.	Nation	Player

==== FC Yednist' Plysky ====
In: Note: Flags indicate national team as defined under FIFA eligibility rules; some limited exceptions apply. Players may hold more than one non-FIFA nationality.

No.	Pos.	Nation	Player

Out: Note: Flags indicate national team as defined under FIFA eligibility rules; some limited exceptions apply. Players may hold more than one non-FIFA nationality.

No.	Pos.	Nation	Player

=== Druha B ===
==== FC Arsenal Kharkiv ====
In: Note: Flags indicate national team as defined under FIFA eligibility rules; some limited exceptions apply. Players may hold more than one non-FIFA nationality.

No.	Pos.	Nation	Player

Out: Note: Flags indicate national team as defined under FIFA eligibility rules; some limited exceptions apply. Players may hold more than one non-FIFA nationality.

No.	Pos.	Nation	Player

==== FC Dnipro-75 Dnipropetrovsk ====
In: Note: Flags indicate national team as defined under FIFA eligibility rules; some limited exceptions apply. Players may hold more than one non-FIFA nationality.

No.	Pos.	Nation	Player

Out: Note: Flags indicate national team as defined under FIFA eligibility rules; some limited exceptions apply. Players may hold more than one non-FIFA nationality.

No.	Pos.	Nation	Player

==== FC Hirnik Kryvyi Rih ====
In: Note: Flags indicate national team as defined under FIFA eligibility rules; some limited exceptions apply. Players may hold more than one non-FIFA nationality.

No.	Pos.	Nation	Player

Out: Note: Flags indicate national team as defined under FIFA eligibility rules; some limited exceptions apply. Players may hold more than one non-FIFA nationality.

No.	Pos.	Nation	Player

==== FC Hirnyk-Sport Komsomolsk ====
In: Note: Flags indicate national team as defined under FIFA eligibility rules; some limited exceptions apply. Players may hold more than one non-FIFA nationality.

No.	Pos.	Nation	Player

Out: Note: Flags indicate national team as defined under FIFA eligibility rules; some limited exceptions apply. Players may hold more than one non-FIFA nationality.

No.	Pos.	Nation	Player

==== FC Illichivets-2 Mariupol ====
In: Note: Flags indicate national team as defined under FIFA eligibility rules; some limited exceptions apply. Players may hold more than one non-FIFA nationality.

No.	Pos.	Nation	Player

Out: Note: Flags indicate national team as defined under FIFA eligibility rules; some limited exceptions apply. Players may hold more than one non-FIFA nationality.

No.	Pos.	Nation	Player

==== FC Kremin Kremenchuk ====
In: Note: Flags indicate national team as defined under FIFA eligibility rules; some limited exceptions apply. Players may hold more than one non-FIFA nationality.

No.	Pos.	Nation	Player

Out: Note: Flags indicate national team as defined under FIFA eligibility rules; some limited exceptions apply. Players may hold more than one non-FIFA nationality.

No.	Pos.	Nation	Player

==== FC Metalurh-2 Zaporizhzhia ====
In: Note: Flags indicate national team as defined under FIFA eligibility rules; some limited exceptions apply. Players may hold more than one non-FIFA nationality.

No.	Pos.	Nation	Player

Out: Note: Flags indicate national team as defined under FIFA eligibility rules; some limited exceptions apply. Players may hold more than one non-FIFA nationality.

No.	Pos.	Nation	Player

==== FC Olkom Melitopol ====
In: Note: Flags indicate national team as defined under FIFA eligibility rules; some limited exceptions apply. Players may hold more than one non-FIFA nationality.

No.	Pos.	Nation	Player

Out: Note: Flags indicate national team as defined under FIFA eligibility rules; some limited exceptions apply. Players may hold more than one non-FIFA nationality.

No.	Pos.	Nation	Player

==== FC Olimpik Donetsk ====
In: Note: Flags indicate national team as defined under FIFA eligibility rules; some limited exceptions apply. Players may hold more than one non-FIFA nationality.

No.	Pos.	Nation	Player

Out: Note: Flags indicate national team as defined under FIFA eligibility rules; some limited exceptions apply. Players may hold more than one non-FIFA nationality.

No.	Pos.	Nation	Player

==== FC Poltava ====
In: Note: Flags indicate national team as defined under FIFA eligibility rules; some limited exceptions apply. Players may hold more than one non-FIFA nationality.

No.	Pos.	Nation	Player

Out: Note: Flags indicate national team as defined under FIFA eligibility rules; some limited exceptions apply. Players may hold more than one non-FIFA nationality.

No.	Pos.	Nation	Player

==== PFC Sevastopol-2 ====
In: Note: Flags indicate national team as defined under FIFA eligibility rules; some limited exceptions apply. Players may hold more than one non-FIFA nationality.

No.	Pos.	Nation	Player

Out: Note: Flags indicate national team as defined under FIFA eligibility rules; some limited exceptions apply. Players may hold more than one non-FIFA nationality.

No.	Pos.	Nation	Player

==== FC Shakhtar Sverdlovsk ====
In: Note: Flags indicate national team as defined under FIFA eligibility rules; some limited exceptions apply. Players may hold more than one non-FIFA nationality.

No.	Pos.	Nation	Player

Out: Note: Flags indicate national team as defined under FIFA eligibility rules; some limited exceptions apply. Players may hold more than one non-FIFA nationality.

No.	Pos.	Nation	Player

==== FC Shakhtar-3 Donetsk ====
In: Note: Flags indicate national team as defined under FIFA eligibility rules; some limited exceptions apply. Players may hold more than one non-FIFA nationality.

No.	Pos.	Nation	Player

Out: Note: Flags indicate national team as defined under FIFA eligibility rules; some limited exceptions apply. Players may hold more than one non-FIFA nationality.

No.	Pos.	Nation	Player

==== FC Stal Dniprodzerzhynsk ====
In: Note: Flags indicate national team as defined under FIFA eligibility rules; some limited exceptions apply. Players may hold more than one non-FIFA nationality.

No.	Pos.	Nation	Player

Out: Note: Flags indicate national team as defined under FIFA eligibility rules; some limited exceptions apply. Players may hold more than one non-FIFA nationality.

No.	Pos.	Nation	Player

==== FC Titan Armyansk ====
In: Note: Flags indicate national team as defined under FIFA eligibility rules; some limited exceptions apply. Players may hold more than one non-FIFA nationality.

No.	Pos.	Nation	Player

Out: Note: Flags indicate national team as defined under FIFA eligibility rules; some limited exceptions apply. Players may hold more than one non-FIFA nationality.

No.	Pos.	Nation	Player

==== FC Titan Donetsk ====
In: Note: Flags indicate national team as defined under FIFA eligibility rules; some limited exceptions apply. Players may hold more than one non-FIFA nationality.

No.	Pos.	Nation	Player

Out: Note: Flags indicate national team as defined under FIFA eligibility rules; some limited exceptions apply. Players may hold more than one non-FIFA nationality.

No.	Pos.	Nation	Player

==== FC Sumy ====
In: Note: Flags indicate national team as defined under FIFA eligibility rules; some limited exceptions apply. Players may hold more than one non-FIFA nationality.

No.	Pos.	Nation	Player

Out: Note: Flags indicate national team as defined under FIFA eligibility rules; some limited exceptions apply. Players may hold more than one non-FIFA nationality.

No.	Pos.	Nation	Player

==== FC Zirka Kirovohrad ====
In: Note: Flags indicate national team as defined under FIFA eligibility rules; some limited exceptions apply. Players may hold more than one non-FIFA nationality.

No.	Pos.	Nation	Player

Out: Note: Flags indicate national team as defined under FIFA eligibility rules; some limited exceptions apply. Players may hold more than one non-FIFA nationality.

No.	Pos.	Nation	Player

== See also ==
- Ukrainian Premier League 2008-09
- Ukrainian First League 2008-09
- Ukrainian Second League 2008-09
