= Rybalchenko =

Rybalchenko (Ukrainian: Риба́льченко, Russian: Рыба́льченко) is a surname of Ukrainian origin. It is a patronymic derivation from surname/nickname Rybalka, the latter literally meaning "fisherman" In Ukrainian. Notable people with this surname include:

- Stepan Rybalchenko (1903–1986), Soviet Air Force colonel-general
- Vadym Rybalchenko (born 1988), Ukrainian footballer
