= Wes Okoduwa =

English footballer (born 2008)

Personal information
- Full name: Wesley Eboselume Okoduwa
- Date of birth: 12 May 2008 (age 18)
- Place of birth: New York City, United States
- Height: 6 ft 2 in (1.87 m)
- Position: Defender

Team information
- Current team: Wolverhampton Wanderers
- Number: 61

Youth career
- 2017–: Wolverhampton Wanderers

Senior career*
Years	Team	Apps	(Gls)
2024–	Wolverhampton Wanderers	0	(0)

International career^{‡}
2023–2024	England U16	8	(0)
2024–2025	England U17	6	(0)
2025–	England U18	7	(0)
- * Club domestic league appearances and goals ‡ National team caps and goals as of 12:06, 16 April 2026 (UTC)

Wesley Eboselume Okoduwa (born 12 May 2008) is a professional footballer who plays as a defender for Wolverhampton Wanderers. Born in the United States, he represents England at youth level.

== Early life ==
Born on 12 May 2008 in New York City, United States, to Nigerian parents, Okoduwa moved to the United Kingdom at an early age, growing up in Wolverhampton. He is the son of Nigeria international Emmanuel Okoduwa.

== Club career ==
As a youth player, Okoduwa joined the youth academy of English side Wolverhampton Wanderers. In 2023, he was promoted to the club's under-18 team before being promoted to their reserve team in 2024. He also was benched for some games including Newcastle United. The same year, he received interest from English Premier League sides Manchester United and Chelsea.

== International career ==
Okoduwa is eligible to represent the United States through birthplace, Nigeria due to ancestry and England having resided in that country for most of his life.

In August 2023, Okoduwa started for England under-16 during a defeat against Italy. He has also represented England U17 and England U18.

== Style of play ==
Okoduwa plays as a defender. English newspaper Express & Star wrote in 2024 that he "is physically suited to the modern game and has impressed with his athletic ability... still has plenty to learn regarding his ball retention and defensive positioning".
