= Rybalka =

Rybalka (Ukrainian: Рибалка) is a surname of Ukrainian origin derived from an occupation of fisherman.

Notable people with this surname include:

- Oleksandr Rybalka (? - 1938), repressed bandura musician of Ukraine, member of the Kyiv Bandurist Capella
- Ivan Rybalka (1919 - 2001), doctor of historical sciences, creator of the Department of History of Ukraine at the University of Kharkiv
- Serhiy Rybalka (1990 - ), professional Ukrainian footballer

== See also ==
- Rybak
