= Andriy Nikitin =

Soviet and Ukrainian footballer

Personal information
- Full name: Andriy Dmytrovych Nikitin
- Date of birth: 8 January 1972 (age 54)
- Place of birth: Voroshylovhrad, Ukrainian SSR
- Height: 1.87 m (6 ft 2 in)
- Position: Goalkeeper

Youth career
- ????–1989: Olympic Reserve Sports school Zorya

Senior career*
Years	Team	Apps	(Gls)
1990–1995	Zorya Luhansk	157	(0)
1995–1998	Shakhtar Donetsk	13	(0)
1996–1998	→ Shakhtar-2 Donetsk	39	(0)
1999–2004	Metalurh Donetsk	68	(0)
2001–2003	→ Metalurh-2 Donetsk	6	(0)
2004–2006	Illichivets Mariupol	46	(0)
2004–2006	Zorya Luhansk	5	(0)
2004–2006	Simurq	12	(0)
Total		346	(0)

Managerial career
- 2010–2015: Metalurh Donetsk (goalkeeping coach)
- 2015–2016: Stal Kamianske (goalkeeping coach)
- 2016–2017: Bukovyna Chernivtsi (goalkeeping coach)
- 2019–2022: Zorya Luhansk (goalkeeping coach)
- * Club domestic league appearances and goals

Andriy Dmytrovych Nikitin (Ukrainian: Андрій Дмитрович Нікітін; born 8 January 1972) is a Soviet and Ukrainian retired professional footballer.
