= Andriy Fartushnyak =

Ukrainian footballer (born 1989)

Personal information
- Full name: Andriy Petrovych Fartushnyak
- Date of birth: 24 March 1989 (age 37)
- Place of birth: Kyiv, Soviet Union (now Ukraine)
- Height: 1.81 m (5 ft 11 in)
- Position: Defender

Youth career
- 2002–2003: Dynamo Kyiv
- 2003–2006: Vidradnyi Kyiv
- 2006: Dynamo Kyiv

Senior career*
Years	Team	Apps	(Gls)
2006	Dynamo-3 Kyiv	16	(0)
2007–2008	Dynamo-2 Kyiv	48	(1)
2006–2011	Dynamo Kyiv	0	(0)
2009	→ Kharkiv (loan)	13	(1)
2009–2010	→ Obolon Kyiv (loan)	7	(0)
2010	→ Sevastopol (loan)	0	(0)
2012	Tiraspol	7	(0)
2012–2013	Tytan Armyansk	16	(0)

International career^{‡}
2007	Ukraine U18	2	(0)
2009	Ukraine U20	1	(0)
2008–2009	Ukraine U21	10	(0)
- * Club domestic league appearances and goals as of 3 July 2022 ‡ National team caps and goals as of 3 July 2022

Andriy Petrovych Fartushnyak (Ukrainian: Андрій Петрович Фартушняк; born 24 March 1989) is a Ukrainian retired professional footballer who played as a defender.

== Club career ==
=== Early years ===
Fartushnyak is the product of the Vidradnyi Kyiv and Dynamo Kyiv youth system.

== International career ==
=== Ukraine U21 ===
Spotted by Pavlo Yakovenko, Fartushnyak was called up to the Ukraine national under-21 football team.
