= Vladyslav Holopyorov =

Ukrainian footballer

Personal information
- Date of birth: 10 October 1983 (age 43)
- Place of birth: Novoluhanske, Artemivsk Raion, Soviet Union
- Height: 1.83 m (6 ft 0 in)
- Position: Forward

Senior career*
Years	Team	Apps	(Gls)
2000–2008	Shakhtar Donetsk	0	(0)
2000–2006	→ Shakhtar-3 Donetsk	63	(16)
2002–2006	→ Shakhtar-2 Donetsk	102	(20)
2007	→ Zorya Luhansk (loan)	11	(0)
2008	→ Zorya Luhansk (loan)	1	(0)
2010	Zirka Kirovograd	16	(3)
2010–2011	Krymteplitsia Molodizhne	20	(7)
- * Club domestic league appearances and goals

Vladyslav Holopyorov (born 10 October 1983) is a Ukrainian former football striker.

Holopyorov as a product of the Shakhtar Donetsk football academy started out his professional career in the second class teams of Shakhtar in 2000–2006. In 2007-08 he was loaned out to Zorya Luhansk. At the end of the season Holopyorov acknowledged to have been smoking marijuana, because of which he was purged out of Shakhtar Donetsk and received a two-month disqualification.

He tried to recover his playing by playing for amateur FC Slavkhlib Slovyansk and later returned to professional football by signing with FC Zirka Kirovohrad. In 2010-11 Holopyorov played for FC Krymteplytsia Molodizhne in the Ukrainian First League.
