= Marjan Marković =

Serbian footballer

Personal information
- Full name: Marjan Marković
- Date of birth: 28 September 1981 (age 45)
- Place of birth: Požarevac, SR Serbia, SFR Yugoslavia
- Height: 1.70 m (5 ft 7 in)
- Positions: Right-back; wing-back

Youth career
- Mladi Radnik

Senior career*
Years	Team	Apps	(Gls)
1998–1999	Mladi Radnik	36	(9)
2000–2005	Red Star Belgrade	126	(11)
2005–2008	Dynamo Kyiv	37	(2)
2005–2008	→ Dynamo-2 Kyiv (loan)	6	(0)
2008–2009	Red Star Belgrade	10	(0)
2009–2010	Istra 1961	37	(0)
2011–2012	First Vienna	38	(9)
2012	Kaisar	10	(1)
2013	Alki Larnaca	9	(1)
2013	Asswehly	0	(0)
2014	Sloga Petrovac	11	(1)
2014	Pierikos	4	(0)
2015–2016	Sloga Petrovac	34	(3)
2016–2017	Šapine	27	(2)
2017–2018	Mladi Radnik	26	(2)
Total		411	(41)

International career
2000–2003	Serbia and Montenegro U21 (Note: Only official UEFA matches included)	14	(5)
2002–2008	Serbia (Note: Including 8 caps for Serbia and Montenegro (known as FR Yugoslavia until 2003))	16	(0)
- * Club domestic league appearances and goals

Marjan Marković (Serbian Cyrillic: Марјан Марковић; born 28 September 1981) is a Serbian former professional footballer.

== Club career ==
Born in Požarevac, Marković took his first football steps with his hometown club Mladi Radnik. He was later promoted to the first team and played regularly for the side in the Second League of FR Yugoslavia, attracting the attention of top First League clubs. Although a childhood Partizan supporter, Marković decided to accept the offer from Red Star Belgrade in January 2000, signing a five-year contract. He spent the next six seasons with the Crveno-beli and won six trophies (three league titles and three national cups).

In August 2005, Marković signed with Ukrainian club Dynamo Kyiv. He helped them win the double in the 2006–07 season. In June 2008, Marković terminated his contract with the club in order for him to return to Red Star Belgrade. He was released from his contract in January 2009.

In August 2009, Marković was acquired by Croatian club Istra 1961. He spent the next year and a half with the Zeleno-žuti. In January 2011, Marković signed with Austrian side First Vienna until the end of the season (with an option for another year). He left the club by mutual consent in May 2012. Until the end of the year, Marković played for Kazakhstan Premier League side Kaisar. He also spent some time with Alki Larnaca in Cyprus and Asswehly in Libya, before returning to Serbia and joining Sloga Petrovac in February 2014.

In the summer of 2017, Marković returned to his parent club Mladi Radnik.

== International career ==
On the national level, Marković made his debut for Serbia and Montenegro in a May 2002 LG Cup match against Ukraine and earned a total of 16 caps (no goals), half of them for Serbia after Montenegro went independent. His final international was a May 2008 friendly match away against the Republic of Ireland.

=== International ===
Appearances and goals by national team and year
National team	Year	Apps	Goals
FR Yugoslavia	2002	3	0
Serbia and Montenegro	2003	1	0
Serbia and Montenegro	2004	3	0
Serbia and Montenegro	2005	1	0
Serbia	2006	5	0
Serbia	2007	2	0
Serbia	2008	1	0
Total		16	0

== Honours ==
Red Star Belgrade

- First League of Serbia and Montenegro: 1999–2000, 2000–01, 2003–04
- Serbia and Montenegro Cup: 1999–2000, 2001–02, 2003–04

Dynamo Kyiv

- Ukrainian Premier League: 2006–07
- Ukrainian Cup: 2005–06, 2006–07
- Ukrainian Super Cup: 2006, 2007
