= 2006 Ukrainian Super Cup =

Dynamo Kyiv	Shakhtar Donetsk
2	0
- Date: 16 July 2006
- Venue: Central Stadium "Chornomorets", Odesa
- Referee: Vitalii Hodulian (Odesa)
- Attendance: 34,000
- Weather: 26 °C (79 °F)

The 2006 Ukrainian Super Cup became the third edition of Ukrainian Super Cup, an annual football match contested by the winners of the previous season's Ukrainian Top League and Ukrainian Cup competitions.

The match was played at the Central Stadium "Chornomorets", Odesa, on 16 July 2006, and contested by league winner Shakhtar Donetsk and cup winner Dynamo Kyiv. Dynamo won it 2–0.

== Match ==
=== Details ===
16 July 2006
20:30 EEST

Dynamo Kyiv	2–0	Shakhtar Donetsk
Marković 10'; Milevskyi 88'	Report

Central Stadium "Chornomorets", Odesa
Attendance: 34,000
Referee: Vitalii Hodulian (Odesa)

Dynamo Kyiv	Shakhtar Donetsk

GK	1	(Ukraine) Oleksandr Shovkovskyi (c)
DF	4	(Brazil) Rodolfo		(substituted off) 44'
DF	44	(Brazil) Rodrigo
DF	6	(Croatia) Goran Sablić
DF	30	(Morocco) Badr El Kaddouri
MF	37	(Nigeria) Ayila Yussuf
MF	7	(Brazil) Carlos Corrêa
CF	5	(Ukraine) Serhii Rebrov		(substituted off) 46'
MF	15	(Brazil) Diogo Rincón		(substituted off) 46'
MF	81	(Serbia) Marjan Marković	(yellow card) 36'	(substituted off) 75'
CF	16	(Uzbekistan) Maksim Shatskikh		(substituted off) 85'
Substitutes:
GK	21	(Ukraine) Taras Lutsenko
MF	17	(Ukraine) Taras Mykhalyk		(substituted in) 44'
DF	33	(Russia) Andrey Yeshchenko		(substituted in) 75'
MF	10	(Romania) Florin Cernat
MF	14	(Ukraine) Ruslan Rotan		(substituted in) 71'
CF	25	(Ukraine) Artem Milevskyi		(substituted in) 46'
CF	23	(Latvia) Māris Verpakovskis
MF	8	(Belarus) Valyantsin Byalkevich		(substituted in) 85'
MF	36	(Serbia) Miloš Ninković	(substituted off) 71'	(substituted in) 46'
Manager:
(Ukraine) Anatolii Demianenko

GK	16	(Czech Republic) Jan Laštůvka
DF	3	(Czech Republic) Tomáš Hübschman
DF	26	(Romania) Răzvan Raț		(substituted off) 46'
MF	7	(Brazil) Fernandinho
DF	8	(Brazil) Leonardo
DF	33	(Croatia) Darijo Srna
MF	4	(Ukraine) Anatolii Tymoshchuk (c)		(substituted off) 73'
MF	9	(Brazil) Matuzalém		(substituted off) 62'
MF	36	(Brazil) Elano
CF	25	(Brazil) Brandão	(yellow card) 55'
CF	29	(Romania) Ciprian Marica		(substituted off) 68'
Substitutes:
GK	12	(Ukraine) Dmytro Shutkov
DF	5	(Ukraine) Oleksandr Kucher
MF	10	(Serbia) Zvonimir Vukić
DF	13	(Ukraine) Viacheslav Shevchuk		(substituted in) 46'
MF	6	(Serbia) Igor Duljaj		(substituted in) 73'
MF	37	(Ukraine) Serhii Tkachenko
MF	38	(Brazil) Jádson		(substituted in) 62'
CF	17	(Nigeria) Julius Aghahowa		(substituted in) 68'
MF	18	(Poland) Mariusz Lewandowski
Manager:
(Romania) Mircea Lucescu

Assistant referees:
Demianenko (Mukacheve)
Skoreiko (Chernivtsi)

Match rules

- 90 minutes of regulation.
- No extra time of regulation if score is level.
- Penalty shoot-out if scores still level.
- Nine named substitutes, of which up to five may be used.

=== Statistics ===
First half
Statistic	Dynamo Kyiv	Shakhtar Donetsk
Goals scored	1	0
Total shots	5	5
Shots on target	2	2
Saves	2	1
Ball possession		
Corner kicks	0	2
Fouls committed		
Offsides	0	3
Yellow cards	1	0
Red cards	0	0

Overall
Statistic	Dynamo Kyiv	Shakhtar Donetsk
Goals scored	2	0
Total shots	11	10
Shots on target	4	5
Saves	5	2
Ball possession		
Corner kicks	2	6
Fouls committed		
Offsides	0	4
Yellow cards	1	1
Red cards	0	0
