= Vyacheslav Sviderskyi =

Ukrainian footballer (born 1979)

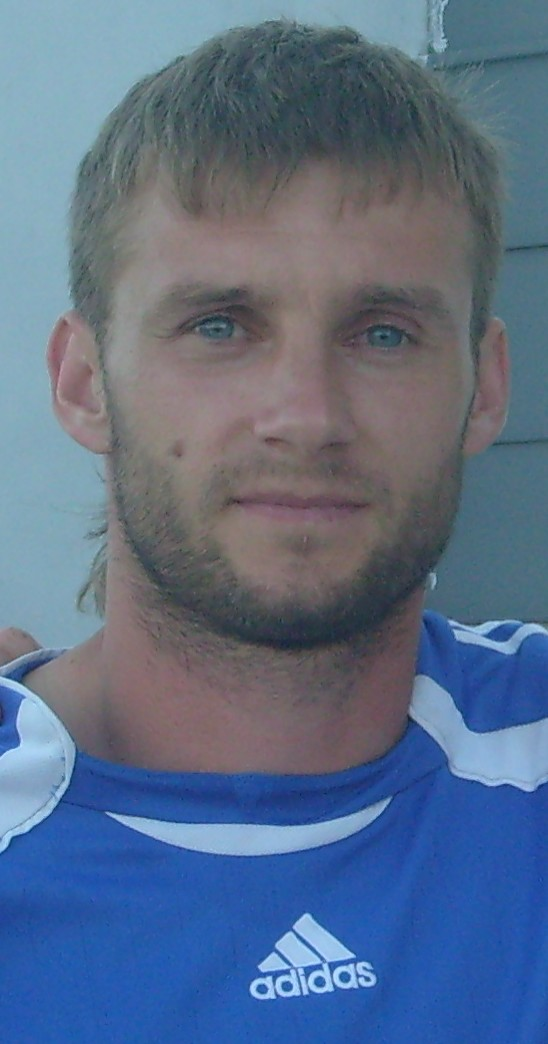

Personal information
- Full name: Vyacheslav Mykhaylovych Sviderskyi
- Date of birth: 1 January 1979 (age 47)
- Place of birth: Kyiv, Ukrainian SSR, Soviet Union
- Height: 1.85 m (6 ft 1 in)
- Positions: Centre back; right back

Youth career
- 1992–1997: Torpedo Zaporizhzhia
- 1997: Obolon Kyiv

Senior career*
Years	Team	Apps	(Gls)
1997–2001	Obolon Kyiv	77	(3)
1999	→ Obolon-2 Kyiv	6	(1)
2000	→ Dynamo-2 Kyiv (loan)	10	(0)
2000	→ Dynamo-3 Kyiv (loan)	13	(0)
2002–2003	Alania Vladikavkaz	24	(0)
2003–2004	Dynamo Moscow	6	(0)
2004–2005	Saturn Moscow Oblast	22	(0)
2005–2007	Shakhtar Donetsk	3	(0)
2005–2006	→ Arsenal Kyiv (loan)	10	(0)
2007	→ Chornomorets Odesa (loan)	12	(0)
2007–2012	Dnipro Dnipropetrovsk	6	(0)
2009	→ Tavriya Simferopol (loan)	7	(0)
2012	Hoverla Uzhhorod	1	(0)
Total		197	(4)

International career
2005–2007	Ukraine	12	(0)
- * Club domestic league appearances and goals

Vyacheslav Mykhaylovych Svidersky (Ukrainian: В'ячеслав Михайлович Свіде́рський; born 1 January 1979) is a former Ukrainian football defender.

== Club career ==
Sviderskyi came through the youth system at Obolon Kyiv and played for the first team from 1997 to 2002. During this period, he made 77 league appearances and scored three goals for Obolon, while also playing for Obolon-2 Kyiv in 1999. In the 1999–2000 season, he was loaned to the reserve team of Dynamo Kyiv, making 10 appearances, and in 2000 he also made 13 appearances for Dynamo-3 Kyiv.

In 2002, he moved to Russia and joined Alania Vladikavkaz, making 24 appearances in the Russian top flight during the 2002–03 season. He subsequently moved to FC Dynamo Moscow, where he made six appearances in the 2003–04 season. In 2004, he joined Saturn Moscow Oblast, making 22 appearances during the 2004–05 season.

In 2005, he returned to Ukraine and joined Shakhtar Donetsk. However, his opportunities at Shakhtar were limited, and during the 2005–06 season he was loaned to Arsenal Kyiv, making 10 appearances. In 2007, he was loaned to Chornomorets Odesa, where he made 12 appearances.

In 2007, he moved to Dnipro. He remained with the club until 2012, making six league appearances during the 2007–08 season. In 2009, he was loaned to Tavriya Simferopol, where he made seven appearances, before returning to Dnipro.

In 2012, he joined Hoverla Uzhhorod, making one league appearance. That same year, he won the Ukrainian First League title with the club, after which he ended his playing career.

== International career ==
Sviderskyi made his debut for the Ukraine national team on 30 March 2005 in a 2006 FIFA World Cup qualifier against Denmark. He later played in a friendly against Israel that year and was part of the Ukraine squad that qualified for the 2006 FIFA World Cup.

At the 2006 FIFA World Cup in Germany, Sviderskyi contributed to Ukraine's run to the quarter-finals. He started the group-stage matches against Saudi Arabia and Tunisia, but did not feature in the round of 16 match against Switzerland. He came on as a substitute in the second half of the quarter-final against Italy. Ukraine defeated Saudi Arabia 4–0 and Tunisia 1–0 before defeating Switzerland on penalties, but were eliminated after losing 0–3 to Italy.

Following the World Cup, he continued to be called up to the national team, appearing in a friendly against Azerbaijan in 2006 and in a UEFA Euro 2008 qualifying match against Scotland. His final international appearance came in a friendly against Israel on 7 February 2007.

Sviderskyi represented Ukraine from 2005 to 2007, making a total of 12 appearances without scoring.
