= Emmanuel Okoduwa =

Nigerian footballer

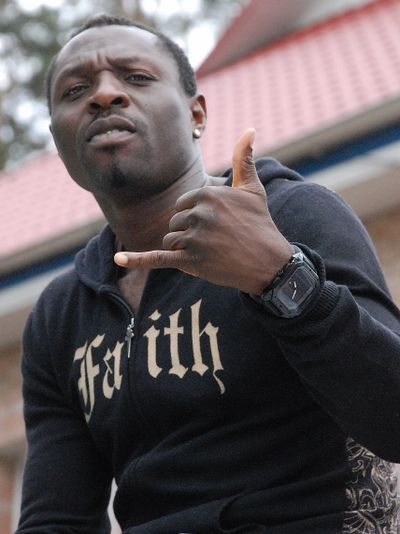

Personal information
- Full name: Emmanuel Osei Okoduwa
- Date of birth: 21 November 1983 (age 42)
- Place of birth: Nigeria
- Height: 1.85 m (6 ft 1 in)
- Position: Striker

Senior career*
Years	Team	Apps	(Gls)
2001	First Bank		
2001–2002	Vorskla Poltava	13	(3)
2002–2006	Arsenal Kyiv	100	(32)
2003	→ CSKA Kyiv	1	(0)
2006	Shakhtar Donetsk	3	(0)
2007	Metalurh Donetsk	19	(2)
2007	→ Kuban Krasnodar (loan)	8	(1)
2007–2008	Germinal Beerschot	4	(0)
2008–2012	Dynamo Kyiv	0	(0)
2009	→ Kuban Krasnodar (loan)	7	(0)
2011–2012	→ AEK Larnaca (loan)	0	(0)
2012	Enosis Neon Paralimni	10	(1)
2015–2021	Sokil Mykhaylivka-Rubezhivka	33	(8)

International career
2006	Nigeria	1	(0)
- * Club domestic league appearances and goals

Emmanuel Osei Okoduwa (born 21 November 1983) is a Nigerian former professional football striker. He is better known in the Eastern Europe after becoming a top scorer in the Ukrainian Premier League. From 2001 through 2007 Okoduwa played over 100 games in the Ukrainian top division, mainly Arsenal Kyiv.

== Overview ==
The former First Bank forward had previously been a big hit at Arsenal Kyiv, where he scored 32 goals in 100 top division matches between 2002 and 2006. He also had a spell at K.F.C. Germinal Beerschot.

On 3 July 2008, Okoduea returned to the Ukrainian Premier League, signing a five-year contract with Dynamo Kyiv.

== International ==
His only international cap Okoduwa earned in the late 2006 during the 2008 African Cup of Nation qualification either against Niger or Lesotho. At that match he came on as a substitution. At that time Okoduwa was a player of Shakhtar Donetsk.

== Personal life ==
He is the father of Wes Okoduwa.

== Honours ==
Arsenal Kyiv

- African Games: 2003 Runner-up
- Ukrainian Premier League top scorer: 2006, 15 goals (joint title)
