= Oleksiy Kurilov =

Ukrainian footballer

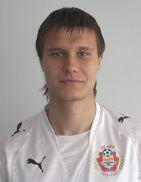

Personal information
- Full name: Oleksiy Mykolayovych Kurilov
- Date of birth: 24 April 1988 (age 38)
- Place of birth: Kerch, Crimean Oblast, Ukrainian SSR
- Height: 1.88 m (6 ft 2 in)
- Position: Defender

Youth career
- 2001–2004: Shakhtar Donetsk

Senior career*
Years	Team	Apps	(Gls)
2004–2006	Shakhtar Donetsk	0	(0)
2004–2005	→ Shakhtar-2 Donetsk	1	(0)
2005–2006	→ Shakhtar-3 Donetsk	10	(0)
2006–2011	Metalist Kharkiv	3	(0)
2009	→ Zorya Luhansk (loan)	22	(3)
2010	→ Volyn Lutsk (loan)	6	(1)
2010	→ Tavriya Simferopol (loan)	2	(0)
2011	→ Vorskla Poltava (loan)	4	(0)
2011–2014	Vorskla Poltava	41	(2)
2014–2015	Metalurh Zaporizhzhia	10	(0)
2015	Metalist Kharkiv	12	(0)
2016	Shakhter Karagandy	4	(0)
2016–2018	Fakel Voronezh	17	(1)
2018	Kyzyltash Bakhchisaray	10	(0)
2019	Slutsk	8	(0)
2019–2020	Kyzyltash Bakhchisaray	8	(3)
2020	Gvardeyets Skvortsovo	5	(0)
2021	Ocean Kerch	7	(0)

International career^{‡}
2003	Ukraine U16	4	(0)
2004–2005	Ukraine U17	14	(0)
2005–2006	Ukraine U18	4	(1)
2006–2007	Ukraine U19	8	(2)
2009	Ukraine U20	1	(0)
2007–2011	Ukraine U21	17	(0)
- * Club domestic league appearances and goals as of 31 December 2021 ‡ National team caps and goals as of 8 July 2015

Oleksiy Kurilov (Ukrainian: Олексій Миколайович Курілов; born 24 April 1988) is a Ukrainian former professional football defender.

== Career ==
Kurilov is the product of the Shakhtar Donetsk youth school system. In Shakhtar, Kurylov played in 17 games in the Reserves, one in Shakhtar II and 10 games for Shakhtar III. He was bought by Metalist during the 2006–2007 season in 2007, however was put in Metalist Reserves. Myron Markevych promoted Oleksiy Kurilov to the senior team during the 2007–08 season, where he gave his debut in the Ukrainian Premier League. In the winter break 2008–09 he was transferred to Zorya Luhansk.

Kurilov left Shakhter Karagandy on 17 June 2016.

=== National team ===
Oleksiy Kurilov has been a regular defender in the Ukrainian Under-19 National Football Team, playing 20 international matches and netting on goal. He also played on game for the Ukrainian Under-20 National Team where he scored 1 goal in 1 game. He was promoted by Pavel Yakovenko to the Ukrainian Under-21 National Football Team.
