= Ruslan Solyanyk =

Ukrainian footballer (1984–2024)

Personal information
- Full name: Ruslan Oleksiyovych Solyanyk
- Date of birth: 8 August 1984
- Place of birth: Poltava, Ukrainian SSR, USSR
- Date of death: 26 December 2024 (aged 40)
- Height: 1.82 m (6 ft 0 in)
- Positions: Defender; midfielder

Senior career*
Years	Team	Apps	(Gls)
2002	Metalurh-2 Donetsk	7	(0)
2003	Lokomotiv Moscow	0	(0)
2004–2005	Vorskla	18	(0)
2005	Kryvbas Kryvyi Rih	0	(0)
2005	Kryvbas-2 Kryvyi Rih	9	(2)
2006–2007	Tavriya Simferopol	13	(0)
2007–2009	llychivets Mariupol	42	(1)
2009	Oleksandriya	5	(0)
2010	Zhetysu	18	(0)
2011	Chornomorets Odesa	4	(0)
2012	Mykolaiv	4	(0)
2013	Kremin Kremenchuk	3	(0)
2013–2014	Tytan Armiansk	21	(0)
2015	Inhulets Petrove	12	(0)
2016	Myr Hornostayivka	9	(0)
- * Club domestic league appearances and goals

Ruslan Solyanyk (Ukrainian: Руслан Соляник; 8 August 1984 – 26 December 2024) was a Ukrainian professional footballer who played as a defender and midfielder.

== Career ==
Solyanyk played for Illychivets Mariupol in the Ukrainian Premier League where he moved from another UPL side Tavriya Simferopol before the start of the 2007–08 season.

He spent the 2010 season playing for FC Zhetysu in the Kazakhstan Premier League.

On 25 January 2011, Solyanyk signed a 1.5-year contract with Chornomorets Odesa.

== Death ==
Solyanyk died on 26 December 2024, at the age of 40.
