= Dmytro Yesin (footballer, born 1980) =

Ukrainian footballer

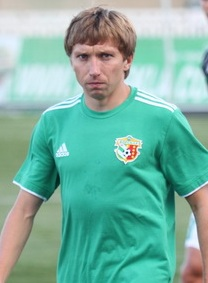
- Yesin in 2011

Personal information
- Full name: Dmytro Oleksandrovych Yesin
- Date of birth: 15 April 1980 (age 46)
- Place of birth: Shakhtarsk, Ukrainian SSR, Soviet Union
- Height: 1.72 m (5 ft 7 1/2 in)
- Position: Midfielder

Youth career
- Shakhtar Donetsk

Senior career*
Years	Team	Apps	(Gls)
1998–2001	Shakhtar Donetsk	0	(0)
1998–2001	→ Shakhtar-2 Donetsk	99	(1)
2000–2001	→ Shakhtar-3 Donetsk	2	(0)
2002–2007	Illichivets Mariupol	154	(7)
2008–2012	Vorskla Poltava	92	(7)

Managerial career
- 2017–2020: Yarud Mariupol
- * Club domestic league appearances and goals as of 6 May 2013

Dmytro Oleksandrovych Yesin (Ukrainian: Дмитро Олександрович Єсін; born 15 April 1980) is a Ukrainian former professional football midfielder and current football manager. He also holds a Russian passport.

== Career ==
He joined Vorskla Poltava from Illichivets in February 2008.
