= Taras Kabanov =

Ukrainian footballer

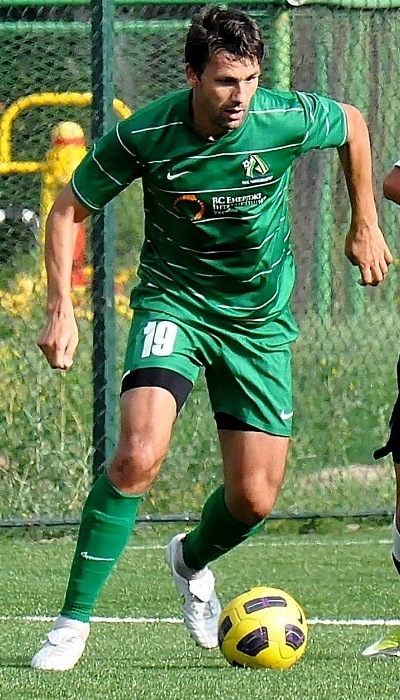

Personal information
- Full name: Taras Volodymyrovych Kabanov
- Date of birth: 23 January 1981 (age 45)
- Place of birth: Lutsk, Ukrainian SSR
- Height: 1.92 m (6 ft 4 in)
- Position: Forward

Senior career*
Years	Team	Apps	(Gls)
1998–2004	Karpaty Lviv	92	(17)
1998–2004	→ Karpaty-2 Lviv	83	(14)
2001–2002	→ Karpaty-3 Lviv	4	(1)
2004–2006	Kryvbas Kryvyi Rih	45	(6)
2006–2008	Metalurh Zaporizhzhia	30	(4)
2009	Kharkiv	9	(1)
2009	Volyn Lutsk	3	(1)
2009	Lviv	10	(1)
2010–2011	Oleksandriya	39	(6)
2012	Belshina Bobruisk	12	(1)
2012–2013	Nyva Ternopil	15	(5)

International career
2001	Ukraine U20	5	(0)
2004	Ukraine	1	(0)
- * Club domestic league appearances and goals

Taras Volodymyrovych Kabanov (Ukrainian: Тарас Володимирович Кабанов; born 23 January 1981) is a Ukrainian retired professional footballer who played as a forward.

== Club career ==
In his career, he began with Volyn Lutsk and then transferred to Karpaty Lviv. Later he was given a free transfer to Kryvbas Kryvyi Rih. He also spent time with Metalurh Zaporizhzhia and the 2008–09 season with FC Kharkiv. In 2011, he played for PFC Oleksandria.

== International career ==
In 2001 Kabanov represented Ukraine at the 2001 FIFA World Youth Championship. On 18 February 2004 he played his only match for the senior national team, a friendly against Libya.
