= Carlos Corrêa =

Brazilian footballer (born 1980)

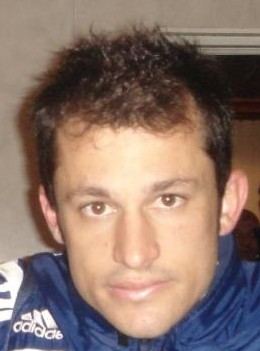

Personal information
- Full name: Carlos Rodrigues Corrêa
- Date of birth: 29 December 1980 (age 45)
- Place of birth: Limeira, Brazil
- Height: 1.76 m (5 ft 9 in)
- Position: Defensive midfielder

Team information
- Current team: Capivariano

Youth career
- 1999–2001: São Bento
- 2002: XV de Piracicaba

Senior career*
Years	Team	Apps	(Gls)
2003–2006	Palmeiras	192	(15)
2006–2012	Dynamo Kyiv	99	(13)
2009–2010	→ Atlético Mineiro (loan)	34	(3)
2010–2011	→ Flamengo (loan)	25	(0)
2012	Palmeiras	17	(2)
2013	Portuguesa	58	(2)
2014–2017	Fortaleza	105	(4)
2017	Capivariano	18	(2)
2018–2020	Ituano	76	(10)
2021–	Capivariano	14	(0)
- * Club domestic league appearances and goals as of 18 February 2018

Carlos Rodrigues Corrêa (born 29 December 1980) is a professional Brazilian footballer who plays as a defensive midfielder for Capivariano.

== Club career ==
As many other Brazilian players, Corrêa was introduced to football on the streets of his city. After playing in various junior clubs, he was noticed by the scouts of Brazilian giants Palmeiras. After several successful seasons in Brazil, Corrêa was transferred to Europe, as he was noticed by Ukrainian top-flight club, FC Dynamo Kyiv.

He debuted for Dynamo in summer of 2006. Carlos wears the number 7 for Dynamo. Scoring three goals in his first three domestic league games for Dynamo, he quickly earned a starting spot in the Ukrainian team. In Ukraine Correa proved himself as a master of corner and free kicks, and regularly performs them for his club.

In 2008 Correa suffered serious injury and missed some of the 2008–09 season. At that time Dynamo had changes at coaching position and the new coach Valeriy Gazzayev could find a place on a team for the Brazilian playmaker. In 2009 Correa lost his place in the first team and soon was loaned out.

In June 2010 Corrêa signed with Flamengo, on loan, for the rest of 2010 season.

On 30 July 2012 it was announced Corrêa would have a trial with Middlesbrough FC after being recommended to manager Tony Mowbray by club legend Juninho Paulista.

On 21 December 2012, after being relegated with Palmeiras, Corrêa was announced as player of Portuguesa de Desportos.

== International career ==
There were talks of possible naturalization of him to play for the Ukraine national football team.

== Flamengo career statistics ==
(Correct as of 28 November 2010)

Club	Season	State League		Brazilian Série A		Copa do Brasil		Copa Libertadores		Copa Sudamericana		Total	
Club	Season	Apps	Goals	Apps	Goals	Apps	Goals	Apps	Goals	Apps	Goals	Apps	Goals
Flamengo	2010	-	-	25	0	-	-	-	-	-	-	25	0
Total		-	-	25	0	-	-	-	-	-	-	25	0

according to combined sources on the Flamengo official website and Flaestatística.

== Honours ==
- Campeonato Paulista Série A2: 2013

Dynamo Kyiv

- Ukrainian Super Cup (2): 2006, 2009
