= Oleksandr Miroshnychenko =

Ukrainian footballer

Personal information
- Full name: Oleksandr Oleksandrovych Miroshnychenko
- Date of birth: 19 January 1986 (age 40)
- Place of birth: Voroshylovhrad, Ukrainian SSR, USSR
- Height: 1.71 m (5 ft 7 in)
- Position: Midfielder

Youth career
- 2003–2007: Shakhtar Donetsk

Senior career*
Years	Team	Apps	(Gls)
2003–2007	Shakhtar Donetsk	0	(0)
2003–2004	→ Shakhtar-3 Donetsk	25	(2)
2004–2006	→ Shakhtar-2 Donetsk	43	(2)
2006–2007	→ Shakhtar-3 Donetsk	11	(1)
2008	Vaprus Pärnu	5	(1)
2008	SK Zorya Luhansk	14	(4)
2009	Dinamo Brest	0	(0)
2009	Volyn Lutsk	1	(0)
2010–2011	Popasna	23	(6)

International career
- Ukraine U19
- * Club domestic league appearances and goals

Oleksandr Oleksandrovych Miroshnychenko (born 19 January 1986) is a Ukrainian retired professional footballer. He played as a midfielder.
