= Yevhen Yevseyev =

Ukrainian footballer

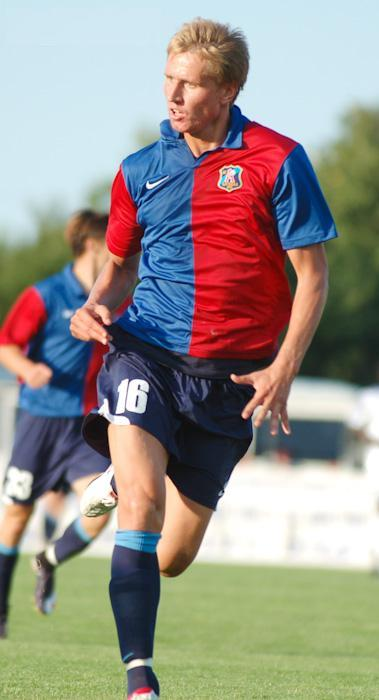

Personal information
- Full name: Yevhen Vasylyovych Yevseyev
- Date of birth: 16 April 1987
- Place of birth: Kyiv, Ukrainian SSR, Soviet Union
- Date of death: 19 August 2011 (aged 24)
- Place of death: Kalush, Ukraine
- Height: 1.92 m (6 ft 3 1/2 in)
- Position: Defender

Senior career*
Years	Team	Apps	(Gls)
2004–2006	CSKA Kyiv	39	(0)
2006–2011	Arsenal Kyiv	68	(4)

International career^{‡}
2008	Ukraine U21	1	(0)
- * Club domestic league appearances and goals as of 19 August 2011 ‡ National team caps and goals as of 19 August 2011

Yevhen Vasylyovych Yevseyev (Ukrainian: Євген Васильович Євсеєв; 16 April 1987 – 19 August 2011) was a Ukrainian professional football defender who played for Arsenal Kyiv in the Ukrainian Premier League. He was killed in a car accident in Ivano-Frankivsk Oblast on 19 August 2011.
