= Platon Svyrydov =

Ukrainian footballer

Personal information
- Full name: Platon Mykolayovych Svyrydov
- Date of birth: 20 November 1986 (age 39)
- Place of birth: Horlivka, Ukrainian SSR
- Height: 1.81 m (5 ft 11 1/2 in)
- Position: Midfielder

Team information
- Current team: FC Avanhard Kramatorsk
- Number: 18

Youth career
- 2000–2003: FC Shakhtar Donetsk

Senior career*
Years	Team	Apps	(Gls)
2003–2008	FC Shakhtar-3 Donetsk	34	(4)
2003–2007	FC Shakhtar-2 Donetsk	39	(2)
2007	FC Shakhtar Donetsk	1	(0)
2009	FC Feniks-Illichovets Kalinine	13	(2)
2009–2010	FC Kryvbas Kryvyi Rih	4	(0)
2010	FC Zakarpattia Uzhhorod	20	(0)
2011	FC Krymteplytsia Molodizhne	11	(2)
2011–2012	FC Hoverla-Zakarpattia Uzhhorod	28	(3)
2012	FC Krymteplytsia Molodizhne	11	(3)
2013–	FC Avanhard Kramatorsk	12	(1)
- * Club domestic league appearances and goals as of 31 January 2014

Platon Svyrydov (Ukrainian: Платон Миколайович Свиридов; born 20 November 1986) is a Ukrainian footballer. He plays for FC Avanhard Kramatorsk.
