= Patrick Ibanda =

Cameroonian footballer

Personal information
- Full name: Patrick Guillaume Ibanda
- Date of birth: 5 September 1978 (age 48)
- Place of birth: Douala, Cameroon
- Height: 1.78 m (5 ft 10 in)
- Position: Midfielder

Senior career*
Years	Team	Apps	(Gls)
1996	Union Douala		
1998–1999	Shooting Stars FC		
1999–2000	Mamelodi Sundowns		
2000	Hapoel Ironi Rishon LeZion FC		
2001–2002	Vorskla Poltava	12	(1)
2002–2006	Arsenal Kyiv	59	(0)
2003–2004	→ CSKA Kyiv	18	(0)
2006–2007	Zorya Luhansk	22	(0)
2007–2009	FC Kryvbas Kryvyi Rih	5	(0)
2009	Feniks-Illichovets Kalinine		
2012–2013	Grants Braes AFC		
2013	Southern United FC		
- * Club domestic league appearances and goals

Patrick Guillaume Ibanda (born 5 September 1978) is a retired Cameroonian football player.

== Career ==
He played in Ukraine for FC Feniks-Illichovets Kalinine.
