= Vadym Rybalchenko =

Ukrainian footballer

Personal information
- Full name: Vadym Rybalchenko
- Date of birth: 24 November 1988 (age 37)
- Place of birth: Kyiv, Soviet Union
- Height: 1.87 m (6 ft 1 1/2 in)
- Position: Forward

Senior career*
Years	Team	Apps	(Gls)
2005–2006	Arsenal Kyiv	3	(0)
2007	Dynamo Kyiv	0	(0)
2007	→ Dynamo-2 Kyiv	3	(0)
2007–2011	Arsenal Kyiv	4	(0)
2009–2010	→ Volyn Lutsk (loan)	18	(6)
2011–2012	Bukovyna Chernivtsi	0	(0)
2013–2014	Ebes KKSE	8	(1)
- * Club domestic league appearances and goals

Vadym Rybalchenko (born 24 November 1988) is a Ukrainian former football forward. He is a right-footed central forward.
