= Dmytro Stoyko =

Ukrainian footballer

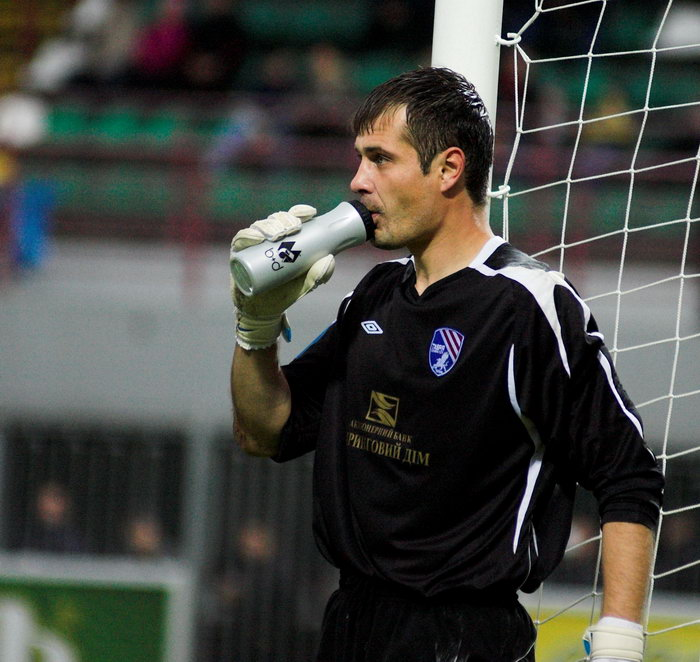
- Stoyko in 2009

Personal information
- Full name: Dmytro Viktorovych Stoyko
- Date of birth: 3 February 1975 (age 51)
- Place of birth: Oleksandriia, Ukrainian SSR
- Height: 1.92 m (6 ft 3 1/2 in)
- Position: Goalkeeper

Team information
- Current team: Vorskla Poltava (goalkeeping coach)

Senior career*
Years	Team	Apps	(Gls)
1997–1998	Metalurh Novomoskovsk	21	(0)
1999–2001	Metalist-2 Kharkiv	22	(0)
2002–2004	Zirka Kirovohrad	71	(0)
2004–2005	Vorskla-Naftohaz Poltava	10	(0)
2005–2009	Kharkiv	50	(0)
2009–2012	Tavriya Simferopol	18	(0)

Managerial career
- 2013: Bukovyna Chernivtsi (goalkeeping coach)
- 2014: Tavriya-2 Simferopol
- 2015–2017: Cherkaskyi Dnipro (goalkeeping coach)
- 2018–2022: Kremin Kremenchuk (goalkeeping coach)
- 2022–2025: Hirnyk-Sport Horishni Plavni (goalkeeping coach)
- 2025–: Vorskla Poltava (goalkeeping coach)
- * Club domestic league appearances and goals as of 31 October 2012

Dmytro Viktorovych Stoyko (Ukrainian: Дмитро Вікторович Стойко; born 3 February 1975) is a Ukrainian former professional footballer who played as a goalkeeper.
