= 2009–10 FC Metalist Kharkiv season =

Metalist Kharkiv
2009–10 season
- Chairman: Oleksandr Yaroslavskyi
- Manager: Myron Markevych
- Stadium: OSC Metalist
- Ukrainian Premier League: 3rd
- Ukrainian Cup: Round of 16
- UEFA Europa League: Play-off round
- Top goalscorer: League: Jajá (16); All: Jajá (16)
Home colours	Away colours

The 2009–10 season was FC Metalist Kharkiv's 65th season in existence and the club's 6th consecutive season in the top flight of Ukrainian football. In addition to the domestic league, Metalist Kharkiv participated in that season's editions of the Ukrainian Cup and the UEFA Europa League. The season covers the period from 1 July 2009 to 30 June 2010.

== Players ==
=== First team squad ===
Squad at end of season

Note: Flags indicate national team as defined under FIFA eligibility rules; some limited exceptions apply. Players may hold more than one non-FIFA nationality.

No.	Pos.	Nation	Player
3	DF	(Ukraine) UKR	Yevhen Selin
4	DF	(Ukraine) UKR	Andriy Berezovchuk
5	MF	(Ukraine) UKR	Oleh Shelayev
7	MF	(Ukraine) UKR	Serhiy Valyayev
8	MF	(Brazil) BRA	Edmar
9	MF	(Ukraine) UKR	Valentyn Slyusar
11	FW	(Ukraine) UKR	Denys Oliynyk
14	FW	(Ukraine) UKR	Volodymyr Lysenko
15	DF	(Brazil) BRA	Fininho
17	DF	(Ukraine) UKR	Serhiy Pshenychnykh
19	MF	(Ukraine) UKR	Serhiy Barilko
20	MF	(Ukraine) UKR	Anton Postupalenko
22	DF	(Serbia) SRB	Milan Obradović
23	GK	(Ukraine) UKR	Ihor Bazhan
25	MF	(Ukraine) UKR	Oleksandr Rykun
29	GK	(Ukraine) UKR	Oleksandr Horyainov
30	DF	(Senegal) SEN	Papa Gueye

No.	Pos.	Nation	Player
33	FW	(Ukraine) UKR	Marko Dević
37	DF	(Moldova) MDA	Vitalie Bordian
44	MF	(Ukraine) UKR	Ivan Voytenko
50	FW	(Brazil) BRA	Jajá
65	MF	(Ukraine) UKR	Yevheniy Lozovyi
69	FW	(Ukraine) UKR	Oleksiy Antonov
77	DF	(Ukraine) UKR	Artem Putivtsev
—	GK	(Ukraine) UKR	Vladyslav Leonidov
—	GK	(Ukraine) UKR	Dmytro Zhdankov
—	DF	(Ukraine) UKR	Oleksandr Lytvyak
—	DF	(Ukraine) UKR	Vladyslav Pidkopay
—	DF	(Ukraine) UKR	Dmytro Pohrebnyak
—	DF	(Ukraine) UKR	Maksym Yakhno
—	FW	(Ukraine) UKR	Yevhen Budnik
—	FW	(Ukraine) UKR	Andriy Haydash
—	FW	(Ukraine) UKR	Serhiy Zahynaylov

=== Left club during season ===
Note: Flags indicate national team as defined under FIFA eligibility rules; some limited exceptions apply. Players may hold more than one non-FIFA nationality.

No.	Pos.	Nation	Player
6	DF	(Poland) POL	Seweryn Gancarczyk (to Lech Poznań)
27	DF	(Argentina) ARG	Jonatan Maidana (loan to Banfield)
—	MF	(Poland) POL	Marcin Burkhardt (loan to Jagiellonia Białystok)
—	MF	(Finland) FIN	Alexei Eremenko (loan to Jaro)

No.	Pos.	Nation	Player
—	MF	(Argentina) ARG	Hernán Fredes (loan return to Independiente)
88	MF	(Serbia) SRB	Aleksandar Trišović (loan to Zakarpattia Uzhhorod)
—	FW	(Georgia (country)) GEO	Vakhtang Pantskhava (loan return to Le Mans)
26	FW	(Ivory Coast) CIV	Venance Zézé (loan to Jaro)

== Competitions ==
=== Ukrainian Premier League ===
==== League table ====
Pos	Team	Pld	W	D	L	GF	GA	GD	Pts	Qualification or relegation
1	Shakhtar Donetsk (C)	30	24	5	1	62	18	+44	77	Qualification to Champions League group stage
2	Dynamo Kyiv	30	22	5	3	61	16	+45	71	Qualification to Champions League third qualifying round
3	Metalist Kharkiv	30	19	5	6	49	23	+26	62	Qualification to Europa League play-off round
4	Dnipro Dnipropetrovsk	30	15	9	6	48	25	+23	54	Qualification to Europa League third qualifying round
5	Karpaty Lviv	30	13	11	6	44	35	+9	50	Qualification to Europa League second qualifying round

Source: uafootball.net.ua
Rules for classification: 1st points; 2nd goal difference; 3rd goals scored; 4th fair play
(C) Champions

==== Results ====
19 July 2009 1	Obolon Kyiv	0–2	Metalist Kharkiv	Kyiv
18:00 EEST (UTC+3)		Report	Edmar 41'; Oliynyk 73'	Stadium: Obolon Arena; Attendance: 5,000; Referee: Oleh Zubarev

25 July 2009 2	Dnipro Dnipropetrovsk	2–0	Metalist Kharkiv	Dnipropetrovsk
20:30 EEST (UTC+3)	Kalynychenko 51'; Seleznyov 57'	Report		Stadium: Dnipro-Arena; Attendance: 15,200; Referee: Yuriy Mozharovskyi

2 August 2009 3	Metalist Kharkiv	1–0	Karpaty Lviv	Kharkiv
19:00 EEST (UTC+3)	Gueye 88'	Report		Stadium: OSC Metalist; Attendance: 12,000; Referee: Vitaliy Hodulian

9 August 2009 4	Zakarpattia Uzhhorod	0–2	Metalist Kharkiv	Uzhhorod
18:00 EEST (UTC+3)		Report	Lysenko 57'; Zézé 90+2'	Stadium: Avanhard Stadium; Attendance: 4,500; Referee: Serhiy Dankovskyi

23 August 2009 5	Metalist Kharkiv	1–1	Shakhtar Donetsk	Kharkiv
19:00 EEST (UTC+3)	Oliynyk 17'	Report	Kravchenko 9'	Stadium: OSC Metalist; Attendance: 37,000; Referee: Oleh Derevinskyi

30 August 2009 6	Metalurh Zaporizhzhia	0–2	Metalist Kharkiv	Zaporizhzhia
17:00 EEST (UTC+3)		Report	Jajá 11', 84'	Stadium: Slavutych-Arena; Attendance: 8,600; Referee: Orest Shmyhelskyi

20 September 2009 7	Metalist Kharkiv	1–2	Dynamo Kyiv	Kharkiv
19:00 EEST (UTC+3)	Dević 88'	Report	Ghioane 15'; Husiev 67'	Stadium: OSC Metalist; Attendance: 36,000; Referee: Yevhen Herenda

27 September 2009 8	Tavriya Simferopol	0–0	Metalist Kharkiv	Simferopol
18:00 EEST (UTC+3)		Report		Stadium: RSC Lokomotyv; Attendance: 14,000; Referee: Serhiy Dankovskyi

3 October 2009 9	Metalist Kharkiv	1–0	Kryvbas Kryvyi Rih	Kharkiv
19:00 EEST (UTC+3)	Jajá 90+1'	Report		Stadium: OSC Metalist; Attendance: 21,000; Referee: Viktor Shvetsov

18 October 2009 10	Illichivets Mariupol	0–2	Metalist Kharkiv	Mariupol
16:00 EEST (UTC+3)		Report	Jajá 7', 59'	Stadium: Illichivets Stadium; Attendance: 5,000; Referee: Vitaliy Hodulian

25 October 2009 11	Metalist Kharkiv	1–0	Vorskla Poltava	Kharkiv
19:00 EEST (UTC+3)	Jajá 3'	Report		Stadium: OSC Metalist; Attendance: 30,000; Referee: Yevhen Abrosymov

1 November 2009 12	Metalurh Donetsk	0–1	Metalist Kharkiv	Donetsk
18:00 EEST (UTC+3)		Report	Dević 90+3' (pen.)	Stadium: Metalurh Stadium; Attendance: 2,500; Referee: Yevhen Venher

24 March 2010 13	Metalist Kharkiv	5–1	Chornomorets Odesa	Kharkiv
20:00 EEST (UTC+3)	Dević 4', 42', 47'; Jajá 22' (pen.); Ponomaryov 83' (o.g.)	Report	Shandruk 62'	Stadium: OSC Metalist; Attendance: 24,250; Referee: Mykhaylo Rodionenko

21 November 2009 14	Metalist Kharkiv	2–0	Zorya Luhansk	Kharkiv
17:00 EEST (UTC+3)	Jajá 75'; Oliynyk 81'	Report		Stadium: OSC Metalist; Attendance: 14,000; Referee: Orest Shmyhelskyi

29 November 2009 15	Arsenal Kyiv	1–2	Metalist Kharkiv	Boryspil
13:00 EEST (UTC+3)	Khomyn 47'	Report	Oliynyk 52'; Obradović 65' (pen.)	Stadium: Kolos Stadium; Attendance: 3,246; Referee: Yevhen Herenda

5 December 2009 16	Metalist Kharkiv	0–1	Obolon Kyiv	Kharkiv
16:30 EEST (UTC+3)		Report	Varankow 61'	Stadium: OSC Metalist; Attendance: 40,000; Referee: Oleksandr Derdo

12 December 2009 17	Metalist Kharkiv	3–2	Dnipro Dnipropetrovsk	Kharkiv
16:00 EEST (UTC+3)	Jajá 22', 34' (pen.); Rykun 40'	Report	Seleznyov 47'; Kalynychenko 58'	Stadium: OSC Metalist; Attendance: 21,000; Referee: Oleh Derevinskyi

27 February 2010 18	Karpaty Lviv	2–1	Metalist Kharkiv	Lviv
15:00 EEST (UTC+3)	Oshchypko 17' (pen.); Holodyuk 55'	Report	Jajá 11'	Stadium: Ukraina Stadium; Attendance: 15,000; Referee: Yevheniy Aranovskyi

6 March 2010 19	Metalist Kharkiv	2–1	Zakarpattia Uzhhorod	Kharkiv
16:00 EEST (UTC+3)	Dević 20' (pen.); Jajá 68'	Report	Alexeev 80'	Stadium: OSC Metalist; Attendance: 22,000; Referee: Yuriy Mozharovskyi

14 March 2010 20	Shakhtar Donetsk	2–1	Metalist Kharkiv	Donetsk
16:00 EEST (UTC+3)	Lewandowski 31'; Costa 79'	Report	Antonov 14'	Stadium: Donbas Arena; Attendance: 31,254; Referee: Ihor Ishchenko

20 March 2010 21	Metalist Kharkiv	4–0	Metalurh Zaporizhzhia	Kharkiv
17:00 EEST (UTC+3)	Valyayev 23'; Dević 59'; Edmar 60'; Oliynyk 79'	Report		Stadium: OSC Metalist; Attendance: 23,685; Referee: Serhiy Boyko

28 March 2010 22	Dynamo Kyiv	3–0	Metalist Kharkiv	Kyiv
15:00 EEST (UTC+3)	Mykhalyk 17'; Milevskyi 45+4', 61'	Report		Stadium: Valeriy Lobanovskyi Dynamo Stadium; Attendance: 17,100; Referee: Yuriy Mozharovskyi

3 April 2010 23	Metalist Kharkiv	1–1	Tavriya Simferopol	Kharkiv
16:00 EEST (UTC+3)	Jajá 6' (pen.)	Report	Idahor 79'	Stadium: OSC Metalist; Attendance: 21,700; Referee: Oleh Zubarev

10 April 2010 24	Kryvbas Kryvyi Rih	2–2	Metalist Kharkiv	Kryvyi Rih
13:00 EEST (UTC+3)	Bartulović 38'; Kitsuta 90+2'	Report	Oliynyk 32'; Fininho 63'	Stadium: Metalurh Stadium; Attendance: 1,500; Referee: Volodymyr Sirenko

15 April 2010 25	Metalist Kharkiv	3–1	Illichivets Mariupol	Kharkiv
18:00 EEST (UTC+3)	Oliynyk 13'; Jajá 72'; Dević 87' (pen.)	Report	Horyainov 19' (o.g.)	Stadium: OSC Metalist; Attendance: 22,600; Referee: Yevhen Herenda

18 April 2010 26	Vorskla Poltava	0–0	Metalist Kharkiv	Poltava
18:00 EEST (UTC+3)		Report		Stadium: Oleksiy Butovsky Vorskla Stadium; Attendance: 12,500; Referee: Orest Shmyhelskyi

24 April 2010 27	Metalist Kharkiv	2–0	Metalurh Donetsk	Kharkiv
20:00 EEST (UTC+3)	Gueye 10'; Jajá 21'	Report		Stadium: OSC Metalist; Attendance: 31,543; Referee: Oleksandr Derdo

1 May 2010 28	Chornomorets Odesa	0–2	Metalist Kharkiv	Odesa
15:00 EEST (UTC+3)		Report	Slyusar 9'; Valyayev 80'	Stadium: Spartak Stadium; Attendance: 4,200; Referee: Andriy Shandor

5 May 2010 29	Zorya Luhansk	1–4	Metalist Kharkiv	Luhansk
19:00 EEST (UTC+3)	Lazarovych 87'	Report	Oliynyk 22', 85'; Edmar 47'; Jajá 69'	Stadium: Avanhard Stadium; Attendance: 8,000; Referee: Oleh Zubarev

9 May 2010 30	Metalist Kharkiv	1–0	Arsenal Kyiv	Kharkiv
16:00 EEST (UTC+3)	Fininho 37'	Report		Stadium: OSC Metalist; Attendance: 37,545; Referee: Vitaliy Hodulian

=== Ukrainian Cup ===
15 August 2009 Round of 32	Enerhetyk Burshtyn	0–1	Metalist Kharkiv	Burshtyn
17:00 EEST (UTC+3)		Report	Haydash 15'	Stadium: Enerhetyk Stadium; Attendance: 4,500; Referee: Orest Shmyhelskyi

12 September 2009 Round of 16	Metalist Kharkiv	0–1	Dynamo Kyiv	Kharkiv
19:00 EEST (UTC+3)		Report	Zozulya 17'	Stadium: OSC Metalist; Attendance: 32,500; Referee: Andriy Shandor

=== UEFA Europa League ===
==== Third qualifying round ====
30 July 2009 First leg	Rijeka (Croatia)	1–2	(Ukraine) Metalist Kharkiv	Rijeka
21:00 CET	Ah. Sharbini 59'	Report	Eremenko 43'; Lysenko 85'	Stadium: Stadion Kantrida; Attendance: 6,000; Referee: (Finland) Jouni Hyytiä

6 August 2009 Second leg	Metalist Kharkiv (Ukraine)	2–0 (4–1 agg.)	(Croatia) Rijeka	Kharkiv
20:00 EEST	Gueye 12'; Oliynyk 60'	Report		Stadium: OSC Metalist; Attendance: 12,900; Referee: (Czech Republic) Radek Matějek

==== Play-off round ====
20 August 2009 First leg	Sturm Graz (Austria)	1–1	(Ukraine) Metalist Kharkiv	Graz
19:15 CET	Beichler 31'	Report	Oliynyk 76'	Stadium: UPC-Arena; Attendance: 11,219; Referee: (Netherlands) Eric Braamhaar

27 August 2009 Second leg	Metalist Kharkiv (Ukraine)	0–1 (1–2 agg.)	(Austria) Sturm Graz	Kharkiv
19:15 EEST		Report	Beichler 32'	Stadium: OSC Metalist; Attendance: 22,400; Referee: (Norway) Svein Oddvar Moen
