= 2008–09 FC Metalist Kharkiv season =

Metalist Kharkiv
2008–09 season
- Chairman: Oleksandr Yaroslavskyi
- Manager: Myron Markevych
- Stadium: OSC Metalist (main stadium); Dynamo Stadium (matchday 29)
- Ukrainian Premier League: 3rd
- Ukrainian Cup: Semi-finals
- UEFA Cup: Round of 16
- Top goalscorer: League: Jajá (11); All: Jajá (17)
Home colours	Away colours

The 2008–09 season was FC Metalist Kharkiv's 64th season in existence and the club's 5th consecutive season in the top flight of Ukrainian football. In addition to the domestic league, Metalist Kharkiv participated in that season's editions of the Ukrainian Cup and the UEFA Cup. The season covers the period from 1 July 2008 to 30 June 2009.

== Players ==
=== First team squad ===
Squad at end of season

Note: Flags indicate national team as defined under FIFA eligibility rules; some limited exceptions apply. Players may hold more than one non-FIFA nationality.

No.	Pos.	Nation	Player
2	DF	(Ukraine) UKR	Andriy Konyushenko
3	DF	(Ukraine) UKR	Yevhen Selin
6	DF	(Poland) POL	Seweryn Gancarczyk
7	MF	(Ukraine) UKR	Serhiy Valyayev
8	MF	(Brazil) BRA	Edmar
9	MF	(Ukraine) UKR	Valentyn Slyusar
11	FW	(Ukraine) UKR	Denys Oliynyk
18	DF	(Ukraine) UKR	Andriy Berezovchuk
19	MF	(Ukraine) UKR	Serhiy Barilko
20	MF	(Ukraine) UKR	Anton Postupalenko
21	DF	(Ukraine) UKR	Dmytro Semochko
22	DF	(Serbia) SRB	Milan Obradović
23	GK	(Ukraine) UKR	Ihor Bazhan
25	MF	(Ukraine) UKR	Oleksandr Rykun
26	FW	(Ivory Coast) CIV	Venance Zézé
27	DF	(Argentina) ARG	Jonatan Maidana

No.	Pos.	Nation	Player
28	MF	(Ukraine) UKR	Roman Butenko
29	GK	(Ukraine) UKR	Oleksandr Horyainov
30	DF	(Senegal) SEN	Papa Gueye
32	MF	(Argentina) ARG	Walter Acevedo
33	FW	(Ukraine) UKR	Marko Dević
37	DF	(Moldova) MDA	Vitalie Bordian
50	FW	(Brazil) BRA	Jajá
—	GK	(Ukraine) UKR	Denys Sydorenko
—	GK	(Ukraine) UKR	Dmytro Zhdankov
—	DF	(Ukraine) UKR	Oleksiy Kurilov
—	DF	(Ukraine) UKR	Oleksandr Lytvyak
—	DF	(Ukraine) UKR	Oleksandr Stetsenko
—	DF	(Ukraine) UKR	Maksym Yakhno
—	MF	(Ukraine) UKR	Yevheniy Lozovyi
—	MF	(Ukraine) UKR	Ivan Voytenko

=== Left club during season ===
Note: Flags indicate national team as defined under FIFA eligibility rules; some limited exceptions apply. Players may hold more than one non-FIFA nationality.

No.	Pos.	Nation	Player
5	DF	(Ukraine) UKR	Oleksandr Babych (to Chornomorets Odesa)
—	MF	(Ivory Coast) CIV	Abdoulaye Djiré (released)
10	MF	(Serbia) SRB	Aleksandar Trišović (loan to Chornomorets Odesa)

No.	Pos.	Nation	Player
—	FW	(Ukraine) UKR	Ruslan Fomin (loan return to Shakhtar Donetsk)
—	FW	(Georgia (country)) GEO	Lasha Jakobia (loan to Arsenal Kyiv)
—	FW	(Ukraine) UKR	Andriy Koval (to Helios Kharkiv)

== Competitions ==
=== Ukrainian Premier League ===
==== League table ====
Pos	Team	Pld	W	D	L	GF	GA	GD	Pts	Qualification or relegation
1	Dynamo Kyiv (C)	30	26	1	3	71	19	+52	79	Qualification to Champions League group stage
2	Shakhtar Donetsk	30	19	7	4	47	16	+31	64	Qualification to Champions League third qualifying round
3	Metalist Kharkiv	30	17	8	5	44	25	+19	59	Qualification to Europa League third qualifying round
4	Metalurh Donetsk	30	14	7	9	36	27	+9	49	Qualification to Europa League second qualifying round
5	Vorskla Poltava	30	14	7	9	32	26	+6	49	Qualification to Europa League play-off round

Source: uafootball.net.ua
Rules for classification: 1st points; 2nd overall wins; 3rd goal difference; 4th goals scored
(C) Champions

==== Results ====
20 July 2008 1	Zorya Luhansk	1–1	Metalist Kharkiv	Luhansk
19:00 EEST (UTC+3)	Ngaha Poungoue 87'	Report	Slyusar 84'	Stadium: Avanhard Stadium; Attendance: 12,000; Referee: Oleh Zubarev

30 July 2008 2	Metalist Kharkiv	3–0	Tavriya Simferopol	Kharkiv
19:00 EEST (UTC+3)	Gancarczyk 34'; Jajá 66'; Obradović 74' (pen.)	Report		Stadium: OSC Metalist; Attendance: 17,000; Referee: Serhiy Shebek

2 August 2008 3	Dynamo Kyiv	1–2	Metalist Kharkiv	Kyiv
20:00 EEST (UTC+3)	Ninković 45+1'	Report	Valyayev 38'; Jajá 67'	Stadium: Valeriy Lobanovskyi Dynamo Stadium; Attendance: 12,500; Referee: Orest Shmyhelskyi

10 August 2008 4	Metalist Kharkiv	0–0	Lviv	Kharkiv
19:00 EEST (UTC+3)		Report		Stadium: OSC Metalist; Attendance: 18,200; Referee: Oleh Zubarev

17 August 2008 5	Shakhtar Donetsk	2–2	Metalist Kharkiv	Donetsk
19:00 EEST (UTC+3)	Brandão 54', 76' (pen.)	Report	Jajá 19'; Bordian 45+1'	Stadium: RSC Olimpiyskiy; Attendance: 20,000; Referee: Vitaliy Hodulian

22 August 2008 6	Metalist Kharkiv	2–0	Illichivets Mariupol	Kharkiv
19:00 EEST (UTC+3)	Edmar 28'; Jajá 59'	Report		Stadium: OSC Metalist; Attendance: 16,000; Referee: Viktor Shvetsov

1 September 2008 7	Dnipro Dnipropetrovsk	2–0	Metalist Kharkiv	Dnipropetrovsk
19:00 EEST (UTC+3)	Kalynychenko 27'; Rotan 29'	Report		Stadium: Meteor Stadium; Attendance: 7,000; Referee: Yevhen Venher

21 September 2008 8	Karpaty Lviv	0–2	Metalist Kharkiv	Lviv
17:00 EEST (UTC+3)		Report	Edmar 52'; Jajá 66'	Stadium: Ukraina Stadium; Attendance: 4,860; Referee: (Poland) Robert Małek

27 September 2008 9	Metalist Kharkiv	3–1	Vorskla Poltava	Kharkiv
19:00 EEST (UTC+3)	Jajá 11', 85' (pen.); Slyusar 21'	Report	Curri 26'	Stadium: OSC Metalist; Attendance: 16,000; Referee: Volodymyr Sirenko

5 October 2008 10	Metalurh Zaporizhzhia	1–0	Metalist Kharkiv	Zaporizhzhia
17:00 EEST (UTC+3)	Hodin 55'	Report		Stadium: Slavutych-Arena; Attendance: 10,200; Referee: (Slovakia) Ľuboš Micheľ

18 October 2008 11	Metalist Kharkiv	3–1	Arsenal Kyiv	Kharkiv
18:00 EEST (UTC+3)	Jajá 67', 78'; Slyusar 85'	Report	Zakarlyuka 81'	Stadium: OSC Metalist; Attendance: 13,500; Referee: Vitaliy Hodulian

26 October 2008 12	Metalurh Donetsk	0–2	Metalist Kharkiv	Donetsk
18:00 EEST (UTC+3)		Report	Trišović 85'; Konyushenko 88'	Stadium: Metalurh Stadium; Attendance: 3,500; Referee: (Slovenia) Damir Skomina

1 November 2008 13	Metalist Kharkiv	2–0	Chornomorets Odesa	Kharkiv
19:00 EEST (UTC+3)	Dević 21', 70'	Report		Stadium: OSC Metalist; Attendance: 13,000; Referee: Ihor Ishchenko

9 November 2008 14	Kryvbas Kryvyi Rih	1–3	Metalist Kharkiv	Kryvyi Rih
17:00 EEST (UTC+3)	Motuz 87'	Report	Valyayev 14'; Fomin 30'; Dević 66' (pen.)	Stadium: Metalurh Stadium; Attendance: 1,500; Referee: (Cyprus) Costas Kapitanis

16 November 2008 15	Metalist Kharkiv	1–1	Kharkiv	Kharkiv
19:00 EEST (UTC+3)	Jajá 12'	Report	Platon 29'	Stadium: OSC Metalist; Attendance: 11,000; Referee: Oleh Oriekhov

21 November 2008 16	Metalist Kharkiv	2–1	Zorya Luhansk	Kharkiv
18:00 EEST (UTC+3)	Gancarczyk 8'; Fomin 43'	Report	Tsimakuridze 52' (pen.)	Stadium: OSC Metalist; Attendance: 8,500; Referee: Andriy Shandor

30 November 2008 17	Tavriya Simferopol	0–1	Metalist Kharkiv	Simferopol
17:00 EEST (UTC+3)		Report	Fomin 65'	Stadium: RSC Lokomotyv; Attendance: 4,500; Referee: Viktor Shvetsov

4 March 2009 18	Metalist Kharkiv	0–2	Dynamo Kyiv	Kharkiv
18:00 EEST (UTC+3)		Report	Mykhalyk 17'; Kravets 68'	Stadium: OSC Metalist; Attendance: 26,000; Referee: Vitaliy Hodulian

8 March 2009 19	Lviv	1–1	Metalist Kharkiv	Dobromyl
16:00 EEST (UTC+3)	Fedorchuk 36'	Report	Edmar 19'	Stadium: Knyazha Arena; Attendance: 2,300; Referee: Viktor Shvetsov

15 March 2009 20	Metalist Kharkiv	0–3	Shakhtar Donetsk	Kharkiv
17:00 EEST (UTC+3)		Report	Fernandinho 17' (pen.); Luiz Adriano 45'; Chyhrynskyi 90+2'	Stadium: OSC Metalist; Attendance: 21,000; Referee: Oleh Oriekhov

9 April 2009 21	Illichivets Mariupol	0–2	Metalist Kharkiv	Mariupol
18:00 EEST (UTC+3)		Report	Dević 70'; Obradović 73'	Stadium: Illichivets Stadium; Attendance: 4,000; Referee: Yevhen Venher

5 April 2009 22	Metalist Kharkiv	3–2	Dnipro Dnipropetrovsk	Kharkiv
18:00 EEST (UTC+3)	Dević 9', 45+1' (pen.); Jajá 30'	Report	Byelik 23'; Rotan 63'	Stadium: OSC Metalist; Attendance: 19,500; Referee: Ihor Ishchenko

12 April 2009 23	Metalist Kharkiv	1–1	Karpaty Lviv	Kharkiv
16:00 EEST (UTC+3)	Dević 50'	Report	Kuznetsov 7'	Stadium: OSC Metalist; Attendance: 16,000; Referee: Volodymyr Sirenko

18 April 2009 24	Vorskla Poltava	0–1	Metalist Kharkiv	Poltava
16:00 EEST (UTC+3)		Report	Dević 89'	Stadium: Oleksiy Butovsky Vorskla Stadium; Attendance: 8,000; Referee: (Norway) Tom Henning Øvrebø

26 April 2009 25	Metalist Kharkiv	1–1	Metalurh Zaporizhzhia	Kharkiv
16:00 EEST (UTC+3)	Obradović 64'	Report	Hodin 85'	Stadium: OSC Metalist; Attendance: 13,000; Referee: Yevhen Herenda

1 May 2009 26	Arsenal Kyiv	0–2	Metalist Kharkiv	Kyiv
19:00 EEST (UTC+3)		Report	Obradović 19'; Zézé 23'	Stadium: Bannikov Stadium; Attendance: 1,000; Referee: Andriy Shandor

8 May 2009 27	Metalist Kharkiv	1–1	Metalurh Donetsk	Kharkiv
19:00 EEST (UTC+3)	Edmar 24'	Report	Tănasă 46'	Stadium: OSC Metalist; Attendance: 14,500; Referee: Oleksandr Derdo

16 May 2009 28	Chornomorets Odesa	1–0	Metalist Kharkiv	Odesa
18:00 EEST (UTC+3)	Levyha 8'	Report		Stadium: Spartak Stadium; Attendance: 4,500; Referee: Yuriy Hrysyo

23 May 2009 29	Metalist Kharkiv	1–0	Kryvbas Kryvyi Rih	Kharkiv
16:00 EEST (UTC+3)	Obradović 73' (pen.)	Report		Stadium: Dynamo Stadium; Attendance: 3,000; Referee: Oleh Zubarev

26 May 2009 30	Kharkiv	1–2	Metalist Kharkiv	Kharkiv
18:00 EEST (UTC+3)	Fartushnyak 49'	Report	Ksyonz 22' (o.g.); Berezovchuk 24'	Stadium: Dynamo Stadium; Attendance: 2,000; Referee: Ihor Ishchenko

=== Ukrainian Cup ===
13 September 2008 Round of 32	Dnister Ovidiopol	1–4	Metalist Kharkiv	Ovidiopol
16:00 EEST (UTC+3)	Zalevskyi 83'	Report	Dević 21', 80'; Jajá 24', 30'	Stadium: Viktor Dukov Dnister Stadium; Attendance: 1,000; Referee: Serhiy Shebek

29 October 2007 Round of 16	Metalist Kharkiv	3–1	Arsenal Kyiv	Kharkiv
19:00 EEST (UTC+3)	Koval 6'; Obradović 28' (pen.); Zézé 90+3'	Report	Starhorodskyi 69' (pen.)	Stadium: OSC Metalist; Attendance: 9,500; Referee: Andriy Shandor

12 November 2008 Quarter-finals	Tavriya Simferopol	1–2	Metalist Kharkiv	Simferopol
17:00 EEST (UTC+3)	Kovpak 85'	Report	Zézé 55'; Trišović 80'	Stadium: RSC Lokomotyv; Attendance: 5,100; Referee: Yevhen Herenda

22 April 2009 Semi-finals	Metalist Kharkiv	0–0	Vorskla Poltava	Kharkiv
18:00 EEST (UTC+3)		Report		Stadium: OSC Metalist; Attendance: 17,000; Referee: Oleh Derevinskyi

13 May 2009 Semi-finals replay	Vorskla Poltava	2–0	Metalist Kharkiv	Poltava
18:00 EEST (UTC+3)	Sachko 12', 31'	Report		Stadium: Oleksiy Butovsky Vorskla Stadium; Attendance: 15,000; Referee: Ihor Ishchenko

=== UEFA Cup ===
==== First round ====
18 September 2008 First leg	Beşiktaş (Turkey)	1–0	(Ukraine) Metalist Kharkiv	Istanbul
19:30 CET	Hološko 51'	Report		Stadium: BJK İnönü Stadium; Attendance: 28,500; Referee: (Sweden) Martin Ingvarsson

2 October 2008 Second leg	Metalist Kharkiv (Ukraine)	4–1 (4–2 agg.)	(Turkey) Beşiktaş	Kharkiv
19:00 EEST	Jajá 20', 74'; Dević 30'; Gancarczyk 79'	Report	Nobre 90'	Stadium: OSC Metalist; Attendance: 37,000; Referee: (Poland) Grzegorz Gilewski

==== Group stage ====
Pos	Team	Pld	W	D	L	GF	GA	GD	Pts	Qualification	MET	GAL	OLY	HER	BEN
1	(Ukraine) Metalist Kharkiv	4	3	1	0	3	0	+3	10	Advance to knockout stage	—	—	1–0	0–0	—
2	(Turkey) Galatasaray	4	3	0	1	4	1	+3	9	Advance to knockout stage	0–1	—	1–0	—	—
3	(Greece) Olympiacos	4	2	0	2	9	3	+6	6	Advance to knockout stage	—	—	—	4–0	5–1
4	(Germany) Hertha BSC	4	0	2	2	1	6	−5	2		—	0–1	—	—	1–1
5	(Portugal) Benfica	4	0	1	3	2	9	−7	1		0–1	0–2	—	—	—

Source: RSSSF

6 November 2008 1	Metalist Kharkiv (Ukraine)	0–0	(Germany) Hertha BSC	Kharkiv
19:00 UTC+2		Report		Stadium: OSC Metalist; Attendance: 35,000; Referee: (Netherlands) Björn Kuipers

27 November 2008 2	Galatasaray (Turkey)	0–1	(Ukraine) Metalist Kharkiv	Istanbul
20:00 UTC+2		Report	Edmar 81'	Stadium: Ali Sami Yen Stadium; Attendance: 20,000; Referee: (Poland) Jacek Granat

3 December 2008 3	Metalist Kharkiv (Ukraine)	1–0	(Greece) Olympiacos	Kharkiv
21:45 UTC+2	Edmar 88'	Report		Stadium: OSC Metalist; Attendance: 15,000; Referee: (Scotland) William Collum

18 December 2008 4	Benfica (Portugal)	0–1	(Ukraine) Metalist Kharkiv	Lisbon
19:45 UTC+0		Report	Rykun 84'	Stadium: Estádio da Luz; Attendance: 9,570; Referee: (Austria) Bernhard Brugger

==== Knockout stage ====
===== Round of 32 =====
18 February 2009 First leg	Sampdoria (Italy)	0–1	(Ukraine) Metalist Kharkiv	Genoa
20:45 UTC+1		Report	Oliynyk 45+3'	Stadium: Stadio Luigi Ferraris; Attendance: 14,774; Referee: (Romania) Cristian Balaj

26 February 2009 Second leg	Metalist Kharkiv (Ukraine)	2–0 (3–0 agg.)	(Italy) Sampdoria	Kharkiv
18:00 UTC+3	Valyayev 30'; Jajá 40'	Report		Stadium: OSC Metalist; Attendance: 33,000; Referee: (Germany) Knut Kircher

===== Round of 16 =====
12 March 2009 First leg	Dynamo Kyiv (Ukraine)	1–0	(Ukraine) Metalist Kharkiv	Kyiv
18:00 UTC+3	Vukojević 54'	Report		Stadium: Valeriy Lobanovskyi Dynamo Stadium; Attendance: 17,800; Referee: (England) Mike Riley

19 March 2009 Second leg	Metalist Kharkiv (Ukraine)	3–2 (3–3 (a) agg.)	(Ukraine) Dynamo Kyiv	Kharkiv
18:00 UTC+3	Slyusar 29', 70'; Jajá 56'	Report	Sablić 68'; Berezovchuk 79' (o.g.)	Stadium: OSC Metalist; Attendance: 26,000; Referee: (France) Laurent Duhamel
