= 2007–08 FC Metalist Kharkiv season =

Metalist Kharkiv
2007–08 season
- Chairman: Oleksandr Yaroslavskyi
- Manager: Myron Markevych
- Stadium: OSC Metalist (main stadium); Dynamo Stadium (matchdays 24, 26 and 28)
- Vyshcha Liha: 3rd (latter stripped)
- Ukrainian Cup: Round of 16
- UEFA Cup: First round
- Top goalscorer: League: Marko Dević (19); All: Marko Dević (20)
Home colours	Away colours

The 2007–08 season was FC Metalist Kharkiv's 63rd season in existence and the club's 4th consecutive season in the top flight of Ukrainian football. In addition to the domestic league, Metalist Kharkiv participated in that season's editions of the Ukrainian Cup and the UEFA Cup. The season covers the period from 1 July 2007 to 30 June 2008.

== Players ==
=== First team squad ===
Squad at end of season

Note: Flags indicate national team as defined under FIFA eligibility rules; some limited exceptions apply. Players may hold more than one non-FIFA nationality.

No.	Pos.	Nation	Player
3	DF	(Ukraine) UKR	Yevhen Selin
4	DF	(North Macedonia) MKD	Vlade Lazarevski (on loan from Dyskobolia Grodzisk Wielkopolski)
5	DF	(Ukraine) UKR	Oleksandr Babych
6	DF	(Poland) POL	Seweryn Gancarczyk
7	MF	(Ukraine) UKR	Serhiy Valyayev
8	MF	(Brazil) BRA	Edmar
9	MF	(Ukraine) UKR	Valentyn Slyusar
10	MF	(Serbia) SRB	Aleksandar Trišović
11	FW	(Ukraine) UKR	Serhiy Davydov
13	DF	(Morocco) MAR	Hicham Mahdoufi (on loan from Olympique Khouribga)
19	MF	(Ukraine) UKR	Serhiy Barilko
20	MF	(Ukraine) UKR	Anton Postupalenko
21	MF	(Ukraine) UKR	Roman Svitlychnyi
22	DF	(Serbia) SRB	Milan Obradović
24	FW	(Ukraine) UKR	Ruslan Fomin (on loan from Shakhtar Donetsk)

No.	Pos.	Nation	Player
25	MF	(Ukraine) UKR	Oleksandr Rykun
26	FW	(Ivory Coast) CIV	Venance Zézé
27	MF	(Ukraine) UKR	Pavlo Rebenok
29	GK	(Ukraine) UKR	Oleksandr Horyainov
30	DF	(Senegal) SEN	Papa Gueye
33	FW	(Serbia) SRB	Marko Dević
37	DF	(Moldova) MDA	Vitalie Bordian
39	FW	(Ukraine) UKR	Anatoliy Didenko
50	FW	(Brazil) BRA	Jajá
51	MF	(Ukraine) UKR	Serhiy Kostyuk
88	DF	(Ukraine) UKR	Oleksiy Kurilov
89	GK	(Ukraine) UKR	Denys Sydorenko
—	GK	(Ukraine) UKR	Dmytro Zhdankov
—	DF	(Ukraine) UKR	Vladyslav Pidkopay
—	MF	(Ukraine) UKR	Taras Kiktyov

=== Left club during season ===
Note: Flags indicate national team as defined under FIFA eligibility rules; some limited exceptions apply. Players may hold more than one non-FIFA nationality.

No.	Pos.	Nation	Player
1	GK	(Ukraine) UKR	Andriy Tlumak (to Zorya Luhansk)
23	DF	(Belarus) BLR	Alyaksandr Danilaw (to Metalurh Donetsk)
69	FW	(Ukraine) UKR	Oleksiy Antonov (loan to Zorya Luhansk)

No.	Pos.	Nation	Player
14	FW	(Georgia (country)) GEO	Lasha Jakobia (loan to Vorskla Poltava)
42	FW	(Nigeria) NGA	Onyekachi Nwoha (loan to Zorya Luhansk)

== Competitions ==
=== Vyshcha Liha ===
==== League table ====
Pos	Team	Pld	W	D	L	GF	GA	GD	Pts	Qualification or relegation
1	Shakhtar Donetsk (C)	30	24	2	4	75	24	+51	74	Qualification to Champions League third qualifying round
2	Dynamo Kyiv	30	22	5	3	65	26	+39	71	Qualification to Champions League second qualifying round
3	~~Metalist Kharkiv~~ (Note: Metalist Kharkiv was stripped of their bronze award for this season by the Court of Arbitration for Sport in Lausanne in August 2013 for fixing of the match Karpaty Lviv – Metalist (of 19 April 2008).)	30	19	6	5	51	27	+24	63	Qualification to UEFA Cup first round
4	Dnipro Dnipropetrovsk	30	18	5	7	40	27	+13	59	Qualification to UEFA Cup second qualifying round
5	Tavriya Simferopol	30	13	8	9	38	40	−2	47	Qualification to Intertoto Cup second round

Source: uafootball.net.ua
(C) Champions

==== Results ====
14 July 2007 1	Metalist Kharkiv	2–0	Naftovyk-Ukrnafta Okhtyrka	Kharkiv
17:00 EEST (UTC+3)	Dević 22', 88'	Report		Stadium: OSC Metalist; Attendance: 7,000; Referee: Oleh Zubarev

21 July 2007 2	Zorya Luhansk	3–2	Metalist Kharkiv	Luhansk
16:00 EEST (UTC+3)	Vorobey 9'; Brovkin 23'; Bunjevčević 89'	Report	Valyayev 52'; Slyusar 59'	Stadium: Avanhard Stadium; Attendance: 10,000; Referee: Yevhen Herenda

29 July 2007 3	Metalist Kharkiv	1–0	Zakarpattia Uzhhorod	Kharkiv
19:00 EEST (UTC+3)	Rykun 9'	Report		Stadium: OSC Metalist; Attendance: 10,000; Referee: Oleh Derevinsky

4 August 2007 4	Vorskla Poltava	1–1	Metalist Kharkiv	Poltava
19:00 EEST (UTC+3)	Glavina 67'	Report	Nwoha 87'	Stadium: Vorskla Stadium; Attendance: 6,500; Referee: Viktor Denysyuk

12 August 2007 5	Metalist Kharkiv	3–0	Tavriya Simferopol	Kharkiv
19:00 EEST (UTC+3)	Fomin 45+1'; Antonov 68'; Zézé 86'	Report		Stadium: OSC Metalist; Attendance: 12,000; Referee: Serhiy Zadiran

19 August 2007 6	Metalist Kharkiv	1–3	Shakhtar Donetsk	Kharkiv
17:00 EEST (UTC+3)	Dević 48'	Report	Hladkyi 17'; Fernandinho 68'; Ilsinho 85'	Stadium: OSC Metalist; Attendance: 20,000; Referee: Serhiy Shebek

26 August 2007 7	Arsenal Kyiv	1–1	Metalist Kharkiv	Kyiv
19:00 EEST (UTC+3)	Mizin 90+1'	Report	Slyusar 20'	Stadium: Valeriy Lobanovskyi Dynamo Stadium; Attendance: 3,500; Referee: Andriy Shandor

2 September 2007 8	Metalist Kharkiv	2–0	Chornomorets Odesa	Kharkiv
19:00 EEST (UTC+3)	Dević 53'; Nwoha 57'	Report		Stadium: OSC Metalist; Attendance: 13,500; Referee: Yuriy Moseychuk

16 September 2007 9	Dnipro Dnipropetrovsk	3–0	Metalist Kharkiv	Dnipropetrovsk
19:00 EEST (UTC+3)	Bordian 40' (o.g.); Nazarenko 42'; Lyopa 84'	Report		Stadium: Meteor Stadium; Attendance: 12,500; Referee: Serhiy Shebek

23 September 2007 10	Metalist Kharkiv	2–1	Metalurh Zaporizhzhia	Kharkiv
17:00 EEST (UTC+3)	Dević 64' (pen.); Bordian 74'	Report	Chelyadzinski 49'	Stadium: OSC Metalist; Attendance: 5,200; Referee: Vitaliy Hodulian

30 September 2007 11	Karpaty Lviv	0–2	Metalist Kharkiv	Lviv
19:00 EEST (UTC+3)		Report	Fomin 12'; Valyayev 68'	Stadium: Ukraina Stadium; Attendance: 17,900; Referee: Oleh Derevinsky

7 October 2007 12	Metalist Kharkiv	3–2	Kryvbas Kryvyi Rih	Kharkiv
19:00 EEST (UTC+3)	Babych 5'; Slyusar 61'; Nwoha 90+3'	Report	Oprya 16'; Lysytskyi 69'	Stadium: OSC Metalist; Attendance: 12,000; Referee: Ihor Ishchenko

21 October 2007 13	Kharkiv	0–2	Metalist Kharkiv	Kharkiv
18:00 EEST (UTC+3)		Report	Obradović 57' (pen.); Zézé 90+3'	Stadium: OSC Metalist; Attendance: 12,000; Referee: Yevhen Herenda

27 October 2007 14	Metalist Kharkiv	1–1	Metalurh Donetsk	Kharkiv
18:00 EEST (UTC+3)	Dević 61'	Report	Mendoza 85'	Stadium: OSC Metalist; Attendance: 10,300; Referee: Ihor Ishchenko

3 November 2007 15	Dynamo Kyiv	0–1	Metalist Kharkiv	Kyiv
18:00 EEST (UTC+3)		Report	Dević 81'	Stadium: Valeriy Lobanovskyi Dynamo Stadium; Attendance: 4,600; Referee: Viktor Shvetsov

11 November 2007 16	Naftovyk-Ukrnafta Okhtyrka	0–2	Metalist Kharkiv	Okhtyrka
15:00 EEST (UTC+3)		Report	Slyusar 44'; Antonov 85'	Stadium: Naftovyk Stadium; Attendance: 4,500; Referee: Yevhen Abrosimov

25 November 2007 17	Metalist Kharkiv	2–1	Zorya Luhansk	Kharkiv
16:00 EEST (UTC+3)	Zézé 40', 59'	Report	Shmakov 10'	Stadium: OSC Metalist; Attendance: 12,000; Referee: Oleh Derevinsky

1 December 2007 18	Zakarpattia Uzhhorod	0–1	Metalist Kharkiv	Uzhhorod
13:00 EEST (UTC+3)		Report	Gancarczyk 90+1'	Stadium: Avanhard Stadium; Attendance: 2,000; Referee: Serhiy Berezka

1 March 2008 19	Metalist Kharkiv	3–0	Vorskla Poltava	Kharkiv
16:00 EEST (UTC+3)	Dević 24' (pen.), 44' (pen.); Fomin 76'	Report		Stadium: OSC Metalist; Attendance: 15,000; Referee: Vitaliy Hodulian

8 March 2008 20	Tavriya Simferopol	0–0	Metalist Kharkiv	Simferopol
15:00 EEST (UTC+3)		Report		Stadium: RSC Lokomotyv; Attendance: 8,000; Referee: Vyacheslav Zhukov

15 March 2008 21	Shakhtar Donetsk	4–1	Metalist Kharkiv	Donetsk
16:00 EEST (UTC+3)	Brandão 37'; Chyhrynskyi 41'; Fernandinho 72'; Luiz Adriano 90+3'	Report	Dević 16' (pen.)	Stadium: RSC Olimpiyskiy; Attendance: 24,000; Referee: Oleh Derevinsky

21 March 2008 22	Metalist Kharkiv	2–4	Arsenal Kyiv	Kharkiv
19:00 EEST (UTC+3)	Edmar 18'; Dević 24' (pen.)	Report	Lysenko 15'; Symonenko 45+2'; Starhorodskyi 47'; Seleznyov 90+3'	Stadium: OSC Metalist; Attendance: 16,000; Referee: Orest Shmyhelskyi

29 March 2008 23	Chornomorets Odesa	0–1	Metalist Kharkiv	Odesa
14:00 EEST (UTC+3)		Report	Jajá 3'	Stadium: Central Stadium Chornomorets; Attendance: 9,000; Referee: Oleh Oriekhov

6 April 2008 24	Metalist Kharkiv	1–0	Dnipro Dnipropetrovsk	Kharkiv
15:00 EEST (UTC+3)	Slyusar 90+1'	Report		Stadium: Dynamo Stadium; Attendance: 9,000; Referee: Viktor Shvetsov

13 April 2008 25	Metalurh Zaporizhzhia	0–2	Metalist Kharkiv	Zaporizhzhia
14:00 EEST (UTC+3)		Report	Dević 26', 76'	Stadium: Slavutych-Arena; Attendance: 8,000; Referee: Ihor Ishchenko

19 April 2008 26	Metalist Kharkiv	4–0 (Annulled)	Karpaty Lviv	Kharkiv
14:00 EEST (UTC+3)	Edmar 11'; Jajá 25'; Lașcencov 57' (o.g.), (red card) 69'; Slyusar 80'	Report		Stadium: Dynamo Stadium; Attendance: 5,200; Referee: Serhiy Shebek
Note: According to the decision of the Football Federation of Ukraine (FFU) Control and Disciplinary Committee (CDC) of 9 August 2010, the decision of the Court of Arbitration for Sport (CAS) of 2 August 2013 was to annul the result of the match Metalist Kharkiv v Karpaty Lviv. Both teams suffered technical defeats, and Metalist was deprived of that season's bronze medals. Later Metalist was disqualified from the 2013–14 UEFA Champions League and that season's European competitions, because of this match. In August 2010, Serghei Lașcencov was given a lifetime ban from football for his involvement in fixing the match. On 17 October 2010, his ban was reduced to five years, a decision that was upheld by CAS in August 2013.

26 April 2008 27	Kryvbas Kryvyi Rih	0–3	Metalist Kharkiv	Kryvyi Rih
16:03 EEST (UTC+3)		Report	Dević 31', 45'; Jajá 65'	Stadium: Metalurh Stadium; Attendance: 5,800; Referee: Andriy Shandor

2 May 2008 28	Metalist Kharkiv	2–0	Kharkiv	Kharkiv
16:00 EEST (UTC+3)	Dević 58' (pen.), 61'	Report		Stadium: Dynamo Stadium; Attendance: 5,600; Referee: Yuriy Moseychuk

11 May 2008 29	Metalurh Donetsk	1–1	Metalist Kharkiv	Donetsk
18:00 EEST (UTC+3)	Checher 72'	Report	Dević 44'	Stadium: Central Stadium Shakhtar; Attendance: 1,000; Referee: Serhiy Zadiran

17 May 2008 30	Metalist Kharkiv	2–2	Dynamo Kyiv	Kharkiv
18:00 EEST (UTC+3)	Dević 37'; Didenko 79'	Report	El Kaddouri 71'; Oliynyk 90'	Stadium: OSC Metalist; Attendance: 30,000; Referee: Andriy Shandor

=== Ukrainian Cup ===
26 September 2007 Round of 32	Sevastopol	1–3	Metalist Kharkiv	Sevastopol
16:00 EEST (UTC+3)	Shevchuk 22'	Report	Jakobia 29'; Nwoha 55'; Zézé 57'	Stadium: SC Sevastopol; Attendance: 4,800; Referee: Anatoliy Zhosan

31 October 2007 Round of 16	Chornomorets Odesa	2–2 (a.e.t.) (3–1 p)	Metalist Kharkiv	Odesa
18:00 EEST (UTC+3)	Vázquez 45'; Biletskyi 56'	Report	Zézé 10'; Dević 47'	Stadium: Central Stadium Chornomorets; Attendance: 6,000; Referee: Oleh Zubarev
	Penalties
	Vázquez (penalty scored); Karytska (penalty scored); Bugaiov (penalty scored)		(penalty scored) Obradović; (penalty missed) Bordian; (penalty missed) Edmar; (penalty missed) Gancarczyk

=== UEFA Cup ===
==== First round ====
20 September 2007 First leg	Everton (England)	1–1	(Ukraine) Metalist Kharkiv	Liverpool
21:00 CEST	Lescott 24'	Report	Edmar 78'	Stadium: Goodison Park; Attendance: 37,120; Referee: (Austria) Fritz Stuchlik

4 October 2007 Second leg	Metalist Kharkiv (Ukraine)	2–3 (3–4 agg.)	(England) Everton	Kharkiv
20:45 CEST	Edmar 21'; Mahdoufi 52'	Report	Lescott 48'; McFadden 72'; Anichebe 88'	Stadium: OSC Metalist; Attendance: 32,000; Referee: (Finland) Jouni Hyytiä
