= 2010–11 FC Metalist Kharkiv season =

Metalist Kharkiv
2010–11 season
- Chairman: Oleksandr Yaroslavskyi
- Manager: Myron Markevych
- Stadium: OSC Metalist (main stadium); Dynamo Stadium (matchdays 27 and 29)
- Ukrainian Premier League: 3rd
- Ukrainian Cup: Round of 32
- UEFA Europa League: Round of 32
- Top goalscorer: League: Marko Dević (14); All: Marko Dević (16)
Home colours	Away colours

The 2010–11 season was FC Metalist Kharkiv's 66th season in existence and the club's 7th consecutive season in the top flight of Ukrainian football. In addition to the domestic league, Metalist Kharkiv participated in that season's editions of the Ukrainian Cup and the UEFA Europa League. The season covers the period from 1 July 2010 to 30 June 2011.

== Players ==
=== First team squad ===
Squad at end of season

Note: Flags indicate national team as defined under FIFA eligibility rules; some limited exceptions apply. Players may hold more than one non-FIFA nationality.

No.	Pos.	Nation	Player
1	GK	(Ukraine) UKR	Dmytro Zhdankov
2	DF	(Ukraine) UKR	Oleksandr Romanchuk
3	DF	(Argentina) ARG	Cristian Villagra
4	DF	(Ukraine) UKR	Andriy Berezovchuk
5	MF	(Ukraine) UKR	Oleh Shelayev
7	MF	(Ukraine) UKR	Serhiy Valyayev
8	MF	(Ukraine) UKR	Edmar
9	FW	(Ukraine) UKR	Andriy Vorobey
10	MF	(Brazil) BRA	Cleiton Xavier
11	FW	(Ukraine) UKR	Denys Oliynyk
15	DF	(Brazil) BRA	Fininho
17	DF	(Ukraine) UKR	Serhiy Pshenychnykh
19	MF	(Ukraine) UKR	Serhiy Barilko
20	GK	(Ukraine) UKR	Maksym Startsev
21	FW	(Argentina) ARG	Jonatan Cristaldo
22	DF	(Serbia) SRB	Milan Obradović

No.	Pos.	Nation	Player
23	MF	(Argentina) ARG	Sebastián Blanco
24	FW	(Ukraine) UKR	Yevhen Budnik
27	MF	(Ukraine) UKR	Yuriy Chonka
29	GK	(Ukraine) UKR	Oleksandr Horyainov
30	DF	(Senegal) SEN	Papa Gueye
33	FW	(Ukraine) UKR	Marko Dević
36	DF	(Ukraine) UKR	Artem Bobukh
37	DF	(Moldova) MDA	Vitalie Bordian
43	FW	(Ukraine) UKR	Serhiy Zahynaylov
44	MF	(Ukraine) UKR	Ivan Voytenko
65	FW	(Ukraine) UKR	Yevheniy Lozovyi
71	MF	(Russia) RUS	Sergei Tkachyov
77	FW	(Brazil) BRA	Taison
80	DF	(Slovakia) SVK	Lukáš Štetina
81	GK	(Ukraine) UKR	Vladimir Dišljenković
87	MF	(Ukraine) UKR	Vyacheslav Sharpar

=== Left club during season ===
Note: Flags indicate national team as defined under FIFA eligibility rules; some limited exceptions apply. Players may hold more than one non-FIFA nationality.

No.	Pos.	Nation	Player
—	MF	(Poland) POL	Marcin Burkhardt (to Jagiellonia Białystok)
42	MF	(Nigeria) NGA	Sani Kaita (loan return to Monaco)
—	MF	(Ukraine) UKR	Anton Postupalenko (loan to Stal Alchevsk)
88	MF	(Serbia) SRB	Aleksandar Trišović (to Zakarpattia Uzhhorod)

No.	Pos.	Nation	Player
—	FW	(Ukraine) UKR	Serhiy Davydov (to Zakarpattia Uzhhorod)
50	FW	(Brazil) BRA	Jajá (to Trabzonspor)
12	FW	(Ukraine) UKR	Volodymyr Lysenko (loan to Volyn Lutsk)
—	FW	(Ivory Coast) CIV	Venance Zézé (to Jaro)

== Competitions ==
=== Ukrainian Premier League ===
==== League table ====
Pos	Team	Pld	W	D	L	GF	GA	GD	Pts	Qualification or relegation
1	Shakhtar Donetsk (C)	30	23	3	4	53	16	+37	72	Qualification to Champions League group stage
2	Dynamo Kyiv	30	20	5	5	60	24	+36	65	Qualification to Champions League third qualifying round
3	Metalist Kharkiv	30	18	6	6	58	26	+32	60	Qualification to Europa League play-off round
4	Dnipro Dnipropetrovsk	30	16	9	5	46	20	+26	57	Qualification to Europa League play-off round
5	Karpaty Lviv	30	13	9	8	41	34	+7	48	Qualification to Europa League third qualifying round

Source: uafootball.net.ua
Rules for classification: 1st points; 2nd goal difference; 3rd goals scored; 4th fair play
(C) Champions

==== Results ====
10 July 2010 1	Tavriya Simferopol	0–1	Metalist Kharkiv	Simferopol
16:30 EEST (UTC+3)		Report	Oliynyk 19'	Stadium: RSC Lokomotyv; Attendance: 5,200; Referee: Oleh Zubarev

17 July 2010 2	Sevastopol	0–0	Metalist Kharkiv	Simferopol
16:00 EEST (UTC+3)		Report		Stadium: RSC Lokomotyv; Attendance: 5,500; Referee: Vitaliy Hodulian

23 July 2010 3	Metalist Kharkiv	1–2	Dynamo Kyiv	Kharkiv
21:00 EEST (UTC+3)	Fininho 45+2'	Report	Shevchenko 55' (pen.); Harmash 65'	Stadium: OSC Metalist; Attendance: 38,600; Referee: Andriy Shandor

1 August 2010 4	Metalurh Donetsk	0–3	Metalist Kharkiv	Donetsk
20:00 EEST (UTC+3)		Report	Dević 32'; Cleiton Xavier 39', 79'	Stadium: Metalurh Stadium; Attendance: 4,200; Referee: Serhiy Boyko

7 August 2010 5	Metalist Kharkiv	2–3	Vorskla Poltava	Kharkiv
20:00 EEST (UTC+3)	Vorobey 40'; Dević 52' (pen.)	Report	Krasnopyorov 19'; Selin 55'; Markoski 75'	Stadium: OSC Metalist; Attendance: 29,750; Referee: Ihor Ishchenko

14 August 2010 6	Dnipro Dnipropetrovsk	0–1	Metalist Kharkiv	Dnipropetrovsk
20:15 EEST (UTC+3)		Report	Fininho 56'	Stadium: Dnipro-Arena; Attendance: 22,846; Referee: Serhiy Dankovskyi

22 August 2010 7	Metalist Kharkiv	3–4	Kryvbas Kryvyi Rih	Kharkiv
21:00 EEST (UTC+3)	Vorobey 16'; Dević 39', 82'	Report	Ivashchenko 35', 55' (pen.); Varankow 45', 61'	Stadium: OSC Metalist; Attendance: 20,700; Referee: Oleksandr Derdo

29 August 2010 8	Metalurh Zaporizhzhia	0–2	Metalist Kharkiv	Zaporizhzhia
19:00 EEST (UTC+3)		Report	Dević 11'; Cleiton Xavier 69'	Stadium: Slavutych-Arena; Attendance: 2,300; Referee: Oleh Derevinskyi

12 September 2010 9	Metalist Kharkiv	3–0	Zorya Luhansk	Kharkiv
20:00 EEST (UTC+3)	Valyayev 40'; Vorobey 44'; Cleiton Xavier 81'	Report		Stadium: OSC Metalist; Attendance: 27,500; Referee: Yevheniy Aranovskyi

19 September 2010 10	Arsenal Kyiv	0–1	Metalist Kharkiv	Kyiv
17:00 EEST (UTC+3)		Report	Taison 24'	Stadium: Bannikov Stadium; Attendance: 1,430; Referee: Yuriy Vaks

25 September 2010 11	Metalist Kharkiv	1–2	Shakhtar Donetsk	Kharkiv
17:30 EEST (UTC+3)	Taison 56'	Report	Eduardo 72'; Mkhitaryan 90+3'	Stadium: OSC Metalist; Attendance: 38,500; Referee: Viktor Shvetsov

3 October 2010 12	Karpaty Lviv	0–1	Metalist Kharkiv	Lviv
16:00 EEST (UTC+3)		Report	Oliynyk 73'	Stadium: Ukraina Stadium; Attendance: 15,200; Referee: Volodymyr Sirenko

16 October 2010 13	Metalist Kharkiv	3–1	Volyn Lutsk	Kharkiv
19:00 EEST (UTC+3)	Dević 37', 79'; Vorobey 80'	Report	Pavlov 39'	Stadium: OSC Metalist; Attendance: 24,600; Referee: Serhiy Boyko

24 October 2010 14	Illichivets Mariupol	1–4	Metalist Kharkiv	Mariupol
14:00 EEST (UTC+3)	Yaroshenko 39'	Report	Oliynyk 40', 42', 71'; Taison 45'	Stadium: Illichivets Stadium; Attendance: 3,200; Referee: Mykhaylo Rodionenko

30 October 2010 15	Metalist Kharkiv	2–1	Obolon Kyiv	Kharkiv
19:00 EEST (UTC+3)	Oliynyk 57'; Edmar 80'	Report	Miroshnychenko 90'	Stadium: OSC Metalist; Attendance: 22,500; Referee: Yuriy Vaks

7 November 2010 16	Metalist Kharkiv	2–3	Tavriya Simferopol	Kharkiv
19:00 EEST (UTC+3)	Taison 45+1'; Oliynyk 45+3'	Report	Shynder 2'; Kornyev 10'; Donets 31'	Stadium: OSC Metalist; Attendance: 22,400; Referee: Yuriy Hrysyo

13 November 2010 17	Metalist Kharkiv	4–0	Sevastopol	Kharkiv
19:00 EEST (UTC+3)	Dević 33', 42' (pen.); Gueye 76'; Fininho 86'	Report		Stadium: OSC Metalist; Attendance: 24,850; Referee: Ihor Pokydko

21 November 2010 18	Dynamo Kyiv	1–1	Metalist Kharkiv	Kyiv
16:30 EEST (UTC+3)	Husiev 31'	Report	Dević 34' (pen.)	Stadium: Valeriy Lobanovskyi Dynamo Stadium; Attendance: 14,860; Referee: Volodymyr Sirenko

27 November 2010 19	Metalist Kharkiv	3–1	Metalurh Donetsk	Kharkiv
18:00 EEST (UTC+3)	Taison 31'; Oliynyk 57'; Pshenychnykh 88'	Report	Zé Soares 35'	Stadium: OSC Metalist; Attendance: 24,500; Referee: Oleksandr Derdo

5 March 2011 20	Vorskla Poltava	0–0	Metalist Kharkiv	Poltava
17:00 EEST (UTC+3)		Report		Stadium: Oleksiy Butovsky Vorskla Stadium; Attendance: 5,350; Referee: Andriy Shandor

13 March 2011 21	Metalist Kharkiv	2–2	Dnipro Dnipropetrovsk	Kharkiv
17:30 EEST (UTC+3)	Cleiton Xavier 73', 81'	Report	Konoplyanka 45', 71'	Stadium: OSC Metalist; Attendance: 36,252; Referee: Yevheniy Aranovskyi

19 March 2011 22	Kryvbas Kryvyi Rih	0–0	Metalist Kharkiv	Kryvyi Rih
17:00 EEST (UTC+3)		Report		Stadium: Metalurh Stadium; Attendance: 4,500; Referee: Serhiy Boyko

3 April 2011 23	Metalist Kharkiv	3–0	Metalurh Zaporizhzhia	Kharkiv
19:30 EEST (UTC+3)	Taison 48', 55'; Shelayev 90+2'	Report		Stadium: OSC Metalist; Attendance: 28,658; Referee: Anatoliy Zhabchenko

8 April 2011 24	Zorya Luhansk	0–2	Metalist Kharkiv	Donetsk
16:00 EEST (UTC+3)		Report	Dević 68'; Villagra 74'	Stadium: RSC Olimpiyskiy; Attendance: 1,200; Referee: Oleksandr Derdo

16 April 2011 25	Metalist Kharkiv	2–1	Arsenal Kyiv	Kharkiv
19:30 EEST (UTC+3)	Oliynyk 13', 24'	Report	Mazilu 58'	Stadium: OSC Metalist; Attendance: 26,893; Referee: Viktor Shvetsov

23 April 2011 26	Shakhtar Donetsk	2–1	Metalist Kharkiv	Donetsk
17:00 EEST (UTC+3)	Alex Teixeira 18'; Eduardo 87'	Report	Dević 77'	Stadium: Donbas Arena; Attendance: 38,712; Referee: Yuriy Vaks

30 April 2011 27	Metalist Kharkiv	1–1	Karpaty Lviv	Kharkiv
16:00 EEST (UTC+3)	Dević 71'	Report	Batista 16'	Stadium: Dynamo Stadium; Attendance: 6,516; Referee: Ihor Pokydko

8 May 2011 28	Volyn Lutsk	1–4	Metalist Kharkiv	Lutsk
19:30 EEST (UTC+3)	Pryndeta 43'	Report	Cristaldo 10', 20', 87'; Taison 81'	Stadium: Avanhard Stadium; Attendance: 6,500; Referee: Yevheniy Aranovskyi

15 May 2011 29	Metalist Kharkiv	3–0	Illichivets Mariupol	Kharkiv
16:00 EEST (UTC+3)	Oliynyk 36', 70'; Dević 76'	Report		Stadium: Dynamo Stadium; Attendance: 7,300; Referee: Serhiy Lysenchuk

21 May 2011 30	Obolon Kyiv	0–2	Metalist Kharkiv	Kyiv
16:00 EEST (UTC+3)		Report	Cristaldo 14', 25'	Stadium: Obolon Arena; Attendance: 4,500; Referee: Dmytro Zhukov

=== Ukrainian Cup ===
22 September 2010 Round of 32	Metalist Kharkiv	1–2	Arsenal Kyiv	Kharkiv
20:00 EEST (UTC+3)	Shelayev 25'	Report	Samodin 62'; Matyukhin 76'	Stadium: OSC Metalist; Attendance: 15,500; Referee: Yevhen Herenda

=== UEFA Europa League ===
==== Play-off round ====
19 August 2010 First leg	Omonia (Cyprus)	0–1	(Ukraine) Metalist Kharkiv	Nicosia
19:00 CET		Report	Dević 24'	Stadium: GSP Stadium; Attendance: 10,179; Referee: (Denmark) Nicolai Vollquartz

26 August 2010 Second leg	Metalist Kharkiv (Ukraine)	2–2 (3–2 agg.)	(Cyprus) Omonia	Kharkiv
19:00 EEST	Dević 66'; Cleiton Xavier 71'	Report	Leandro 60'; Rengifo 64'	Stadium: OSC Metalist; Attendance: 30,360; Referee: (Slovenia) Matej Jug

==== Group stage ====
Pos	Team	Pld	W	D	L	GF	GA	GD	Pts	Qualification	PSV	MET	SAM	DEB
1	(Netherlands) PSV Eindhoven	6	4	2	0	10	3	+7	14	Advance to knockout phase	—	0–0	1–1	3–0
2	(Ukraine) Metalist Kharkiv	6	3	2	1	9	4	+5	11	Advance to knockout phase	0–2	—	2–1	2–1
3	(Italy) Sampdoria	6	1	2	3	4	7	−3	5		1–2	0–0	—	1–0
4	(Hungary) Debrecen	6	1	0	5	4	13	−9	3		1–2	0–5	2–0	—

Source: Soccerway

16 September 2010 1	Debrecen (Hungary)	0–5	(Ukraine) Metalist Kharkiv	Budapest
21:05 UTC+1		Report	Edmar 24', 74'; Cleiton Xavier 34'; Fininho 77'; Valyayev 89'	Stadium: Ferenc Puskás Stadium; Attendance: 8,000; Referee: (North Macedonia) Aleksandar Stavrev

30 September 2010 2	Metalist Kharkiv (Ukraine)	0–2	(Netherlands) PSV Eindhoven	Kharkiv
19:00 UTC+2		Report	Dzsudzsák 27' (pen.); Berg 30'	Stadium: OSC Metalist; Attendance: 38,100; Referee: (France) Tony Chapron

21 October 2010 3	Metalist Kharkiv (Ukraine)	2–1	(Italy) Sampdoria	Kharkiv
19:00 UTC+2	Taison 38'; Cleiton Xavier 73'	Report	Koman 32'	Stadium: OSC Metalist; Attendance: 34,580; Referee: (Germany) Florian Meyer

4 November 2010 4	Sampdoria (Italy)	0–0	(Ukraine) Metalist Kharkiv	Genoa
21:05 UTC+1		Report		Stadium: Stadio Luigi Ferraris; Attendance: 13,259; Referee: (Spain) Fernando Teixeira Vitienes

1 December 2010 5	Metalist Kharkiv (Ukraine)	2–1	(Hungary) Debrecen	Kharkiv
19:00 UTC+2	Bódi 52' (o.g.); Oliynyk 88'	Report	Czvitkovics 48'	Stadium: OSC Metalist; Attendance: 31,200; Referee: (Sweden) Daniel Stålhammar

16 December 2010 6	PSV Eindhoven (Netherlands)	0–0	(Ukraine) Metalist Kharkiv	Eindhoven
21:05 UTC+1		Report		Stadium: Philips Stadion; Attendance: 15,300; Referee: (Greece) Anastasios Kakos

==== Knockout stage ====
===== Round of 32 =====
17 February 2011 First leg	Metalist Kharkiv (Ukraine)	0–4	(Germany) Bayer Leverkusen	Kharkiv
17:00 UTC+2		Report	Derdiyok 23'; Castro 72'; Sam 90', 90+2'	Stadium: OSC Metalist; Attendance: 35,150; Referee: (Belgium) Serge Gumienny

24 February 2011 Second leg	Bayer Leverkusen (Germany)	2–0 (6–0 agg.)	(Ukraine) Metalist Kharkiv	Leverkusen
19:00 UTC+1	Rolfes 47'; Ballack 70'	Report		Stadium: BayArena; Attendance: 16,212; Referee: (Scotland) Willie Collum
