= Roman Butenko =

Ukrainian footballer

Personal information
- Full name: Roman Anatoliyovych Butenko
- Date of birth: 30 March 1980
- Place of birth: Donetsk, Ukrainian SSR, Soviet Union
- Date of death: 30 November 2012 (aged 32)
- Height: 1.73 m (5 ft 8 in)
- Position: Midfielder

Youth career
- –1996: KhDVUFK-1

Senior career*
Years	Team	Apps	(Gls)
1996–2000	Shakhtar-2 Donetsk	111	(9)
2000	Shakhtar-3 Donetsk	2	(1)
2001	Polihraftekhnika Oleksandriya	6	(1)
2001	Polissya Zhytomyr	6	(1)
2002	VAVK Volodymyrivka	4	(0)
2003–2004	Arsenal Kharkiv	52	(5)
2003	→ Helios Kharkiv (loan)	2	(1)
2006	Lokomotyv Dvorichna	3	(0)
2007	Banants	7	(1)
2007	Tytan Donetsk	9	(0)
2008–2009	Metalist Kharkiv	1	(0)
- * Club domestic league appearances and goals

Roman Anatoliyovych Butenko (Ukrainian: Роман Анатолійович Бутенко; 30 March 1980 – 30 November 2012) was a Ukrainian professional footballer who played as a midfielder.

== Career ==
=== Polissya Zhytomyr ===
In 2001, Butenko moved to the Ukrainian First League club Polissya Zhytomyr.

=== Metalist Kharkiv ===
In January 2008, Butenko moved to Metalist Kharkiv. He played initially for the reserves squad, but was promoted by head coach Myron Markevych to the senior squad in the beginning of the 2008–09 season. Butenko played 1 match for Metalist Kharkiv in the Ukrainian Premier League.

== Personal life ==
On 30 November 2012, Butenko died in a car accident.
