= Marko Dević =

Ukrainian footballer

Marko Dević Марко Девић
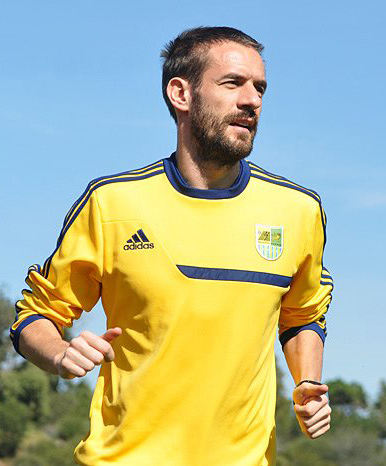
- Dević in 2014

Personal information
- Full name: Marko Dević
- Date of birth: 27 October 1983 (age 43)
- Place of birth: Belgrade, SR Serbia, SFR Yugoslavia
- Height: 1.85 m (6 ft 1 in)
- Positions: Attacking midfielder; forward

Youth career
- Zvezdara
- OFK Beograd

Senior career*
Years	Team	Apps	(Gls)
2001–2002	Zvezdara	14	(2)
2002–2003	Železnik	19	(1)
2003–2004	Radnički Beograd	16	(1)
2004	Voždovac	14	(4)
2005–2006	Volyn Lutsk	32	(2)
2006–2012	Metalist Kharkiv	148	(64)
2012–2013	Shakhtar Donetsk	12	(4)
2013–2014	Metalist Kharkiv	27	(20)
2014–2016	Rubin Kazan	41	(11)
2015	→ Al-Rayyan (loan)	7	(6)
2017	Rostov	6	(1)
2017–2018	Vaduz	30	(13)
2018–2019	Sabah	21	(8)
2019	Voždovac	12	(4)
2020	Sabah	3	(1)
Total		402	(142)

International career
2008–2014	Ukraine	35	(7)
- * Club domestic league appearances and goals

Marko Dević (Serbian Cyrillic: Марко Девић; Ukrainian: Марко Девiч, romanized: Marko Devich; born 27 October 1983) is a former professional footballer. Born in Yugoslavia, he earned 35 caps and scored 7 international goals for the Ukraine national team. In 2013, he became the first player to score a hat-trick for Ukraine in an official match.

== Club career ==
=== Early career ===
Born in Belgrade (Serbia, SFR Yugoslavia), Dević started his career at his hometown club Zvezdara, making 14 appearances and scoring twice in the 2001–02 season, during which time the club got relegated from the top division. He later played for Železnik, Radnički Beograd and Voždovac, all in Serbia. He spent just one year at each of the clubs. He scored three goals in 20 appearances for Železnik, including one goal in 19 league appearances and two goals in one cup match. He scored once in 16 appearances for Radnički, before joining Voždovac where he scored four times in 14 appearances.

=== Ukraine ===
==== Volyn Lutsk ====
In 2005, Ukrainian club Volyn Lutsk acquired Dević. During the 2004–05 Ukrainian Premier League season, he made 14 appearances but failed to score a single goal as Volyn finished in 8th position. The following season he netted twice in 18 league appearances for Volyn. At the end of the season the club was relegated. Dević made 32 league appearances for Volyn and one cup appearance, scoring two goals.

==== Metalist Kharkiv ====
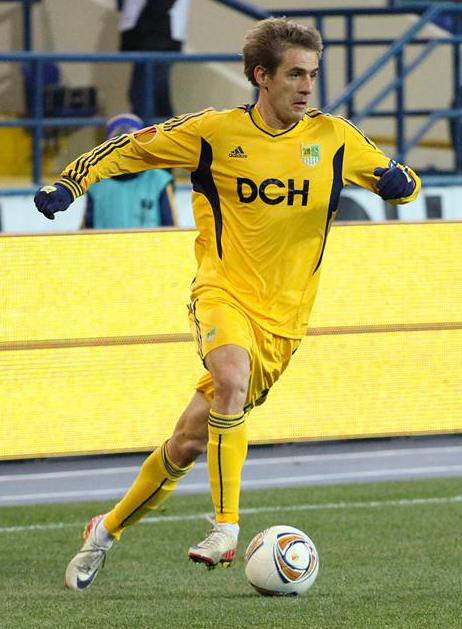
Dević playing against Malmö FF in November 2011

Myron Markevych brought Dević to Vyscha Liha club Metalist Kharkiv. He scored 4 goals in 27 league appearances in his first season as Metalist finished in 3rd position. In the 2007–08 season, he was the Ukrainian Premier League top scorer with 19 goals in 27 matches played. Close behind him were Oleksandr Hladky, Oleksandr Kosyrin and Yevhen Seleznyov, each with 17 goals. Despite Dević's prolific scoring, Metalist finished in third place once again. Dević had a slow start to the 2008–09 season but in the 13th round he scored both goals in a 2–0 win over Chornomorets Odesa. He finished the season with eight goals from 24 league matches as Metalist again finished third. Metalist also made it to the round of 16 in the UEFA Cup but lost out to another Ukrainian side, Dynamo Kyiv, on away goals after a 3–3 aggregate score. Dević scored eight goals in 24 league appearances in the 2008–09 season, with Metalist finishing in 3rd place.

In the 2009–10 season he netted eight times in 20 league appearances as Metalist finished third. In the 2010–11 season Dević topped the assist table for the season with 9 assists. He also managed 14 goals in 24 league appearances to become the second highest goal scorer behind Yevhen Seleznyov of Dnipro, helping Metalist to a 3rd-place finish.

The 2011–12 season saw Dević score 11 goals from 26 league matches as Metalist finished 3rd for the sixth season in a row. Metalist also progressed to the quarter final stage of the Europa League, losing out to Portuguese side Sporting 3–2 on aggregate. Dević scored five goals and three assists in 484 minutes of play in the competition, finishing in a tie for eighth place in the scoring charts.

He left the club in 2012 after six seasons to join the reigning Ukrainian Premier League champions Shakhtar Donetsk. Dević managed to score 64 goals in 148 league appearances for Metalist and 75 from 192 appearances in all competitions.

==== Shakhtar Donetsk ====
Dević joined Shakhtar Donetsk during the 2012–13 Premier League season on a four-year contract for a fee of £4.4 million. Although he had the number 33 at Metalist, he instead took number 18 at Shakhtar as the number 33 shirt was already assigned to Darijo Srna. He made his first appearance for Shakhtar as a 77th-minute substitute for Alex Teixeira in a 2–0 victory over Metalurh Donetsk in the 2012 Super Cup. This success marked Dević's first trophy. His league debut for Shakhtar came in a comprehensive 6–0 victory over Arsenal Kyiv. He came on as a substitute for Alex Teixeira in the 69th minute and scored his first goal for Shakhtar, a penalty, in the 94th minute of the match.

His first start came in a commanding 4–0 victory over Volyn Lutsk. He scored the first goal of the match after 4 minutes and added an assist for Henrikh Mkhitaryan. He scored another goal in a 4–1 win against Vorskla.

==== Return to Metalist ====
On 28 February 2013, Dević returned to Metalist on a four-year deal.

=== Russia ===
On 27 February 2014, Dević signed a four-year deal with Rubin Kazan, where he played 14 games and scored 3 goals. In January 2015, he was sent for a loan to Qatar's Al Rayyan, where he played 18 games and scored 11 goals. He helped his team win promotion to the Qatar Stars League.

On 17 January 2017, Dević signed a 1.5-year deal with a Russian Premier League club FC Rostov. After only six months, Dević left Rostov on 17 June 2017.

=== Later career ===
On 7 August 2017, he joined FC Vaduz.

On 4 August 2018, Dević signed a two-year contract with Sabah FC.

On 16 January 2020, Sabah announced the return of Dević on a contract until the end of the 2019–20 season. Dević left Sabah on 24 April 2020.

== International career ==
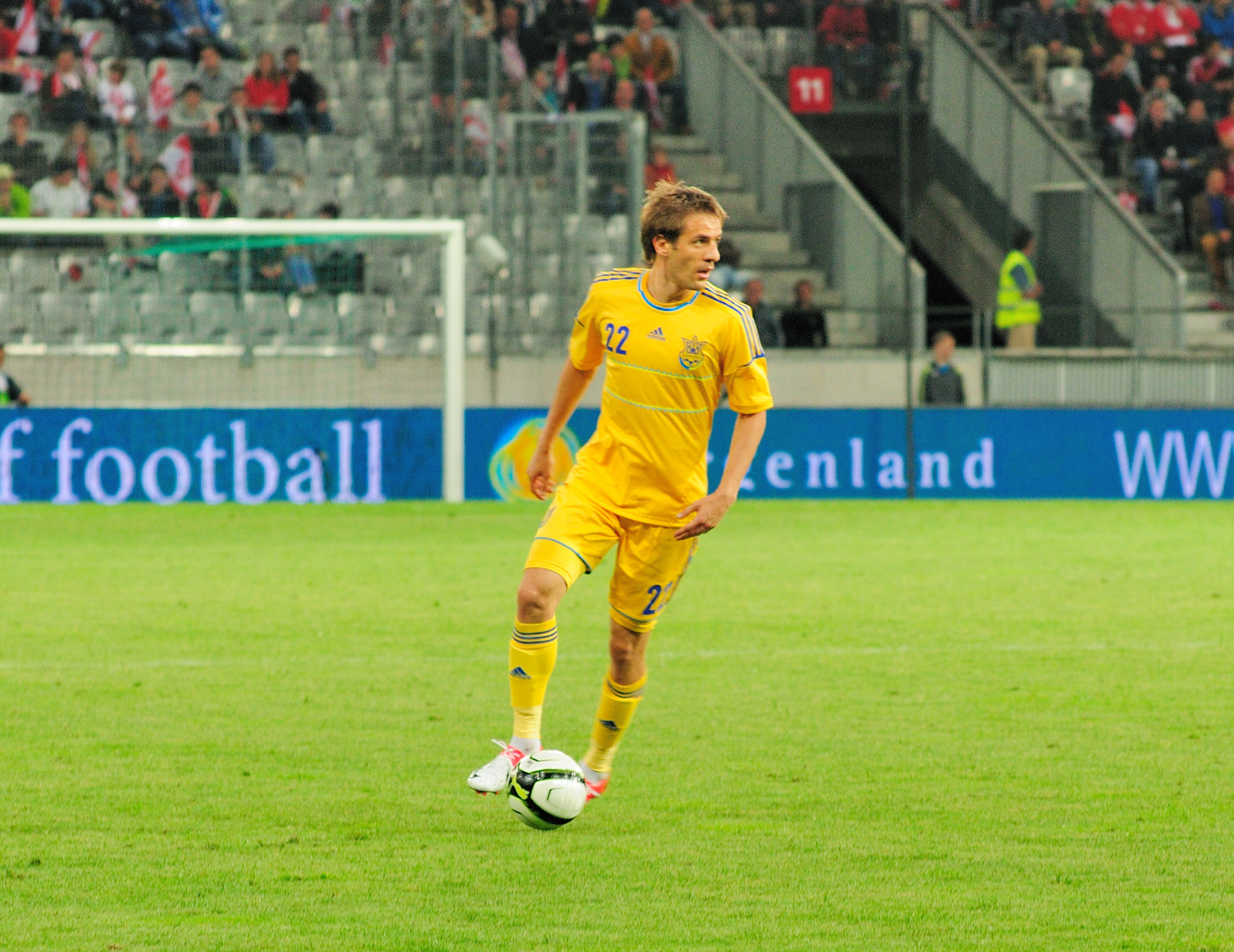
Dević in action against Austria in June 2012

In June 2008, Dević became a naturalized Ukrainian citizen in hopes of playing for the Ukraine national team. Although Dević is not the first footballer from outside the former Soviet Union to accept Ukrainian citizenship, his decision has led to numerous discussions in the media on the adoption of foreign players. The first international player to become a naturalized Ukrainian was Mamadi Sangare from Conakry, Guinea, who in 2008 played for Desna Chernihiv, and before that CSKA Kyiv.

Dević also had a very successful season in 2007–08, scoring 19 goals and becoming top scorer, putting pressure on national team coach Olexiy Mykhailychenko to select him. But Mykhailychenko hesitated, stating that one great season might not be enough to justify Devic's selection for Ukraine. Nonetheless, he did cap Dević for a friendly match against Norway on 19 November 2008, becoming the third naturalized citizen on the Ukraine national football team called up at that time, along with Oleksandr Aliyev and Artem Milevskyi. Dević played the second half of the match and wore the number 10 shirt. In the next couple of years his match participation dropped noticeably, due to his low performance in the Premier League as well as not scoring with the national team.

Dević was a member of Ukraine's squad for UEFA Euro 2012. On 19 June 2012, he was in the starting line-up for the game against England in the final round of games before the quarter-finals. Ukraine lost 0–1, with Wayne Rooney's second-half header carrying England through at the Donbas Arena in Donetsk. However, Dević had a goal disallowed in the second half when John Terry hooked the ball clear off the goal line, as confirmed by video replays. England ultimately won Group D and advanced along with France, while Ukraine were eliminated. Dević's "ghost goal" reopened football's goal-line technology debate. Replays of the build-up also appeared to show Dević's teammate, Artem Milevskyi, who set up Dević, in an offside position when the ball was played to him, although the play was not flagged for offside by match officials. On the following day, however, UEFA and its chief refereeing officer, Pierluigi Collina, delivered their final verdict: match officials had erroneously denied Dević and Ukraine a legitimate goal.

Dević became the first footballer on the Ukraine national team to score a hat-trick.

== Career statistics ==
=== Club ===
As of 28 April 2020

Appearances and goals by club, season and competition
Club	Season	League			Cup		Continental		Super Cup		Total	
Club	Season	Division	Apps	Goals	Apps	Goals	Apps	Goals	Apps	Goals	Apps	Goals
Zvezdara	2001–02	First League of Serbia and Montenegro	14	2	0	0	—		—		14	2
Železnik	2002–03	First League of Serbia and Montenegro	19	1	1	2	—		—		20	3
Radnički Beograd	2003–04	Second League of Serbia and Montenegro	16	1	0	0	—		—		16	1
Voždovac	2004–05	Second League of Serbia and Montenegro	14	4	0	0	—		—		14	4
Volyn Lutsk	2004–05	Vyshcha Liha	14	0	0	0	—		—		14	0
Volyn Lutsk	2005–06	Vyshcha Liha	18	2	1	0	—		—		19	2
Volyn Lutsk	Total		32	2	1	0	—		—		33	2
Metalist Kharkiv	2006–07	Ukrainian Premier League	27	4	5	0	—		—		32	4
Metalist Kharkiv	2007–08	Ukrainian Premier League	27	19	1	1	2	0	—		30	20
Metalist Kharkiv	2008–09	Ukrainian Premier League	24	8	3	2	9	1	—		36	11
Metalist Kharkiv	2009–10	Ukrainian Premier League	20	8	1	0	4	0	—		25	8
Metalist Kharkiv	2010–11	Ukrainian Premier League	24	14	0	0	6	2	—		30	16
Metalist Kharkiv	2011–12	Ukrainian Premier League	26	11	0	0	13	5	—		39	16
Metalist Kharkiv	Total		148	64	10	3	34	8	—		192	75
Shakhtar Donetsk	2012–13	Ukrainian Premier League	12	4	1	0	2	0	1	0	16	4
Metalist Kharkiv	2012–13	Ukrainian Premier League	10	5	0	0	0	0	—		10	5
Metalist Kharkiv	2013–14	Ukrainian Premier League	17	15	2	1	2	2	—		21	18
Metalist Kharkiv	Total		27	20	2	1	2	2	—		31	23
Rubin Kazan	2013–14	Russian Premier League	11	3	0	0	0	0	—		11	3
Rubin Kazan	2014–15	Russian Premier League	3	0	0	0	—		—		3	0
Rubin Kazan	2015–16	Russian Premier League	19	7	0	0	6	2	—		25	9
Rubin Kazan	2016–17	Russian Premier League	8	1	2	1	—		—		10	2
Rubin Kazan	Total		41	11	2	1	6	2	—		49	14
Al-Rayyan (loan)	2014–15	Qatari Second Division	7	6	4	1	7	4	—		18	11
Rostov	2016–17	Russian Premier League	6	1	0	0	2	0	—		8	1
Vaduz	2017–18	Swiss Challenge League	30	13	3	3	0	0	—		33	16
Sabah	2018–19	Azerbaijan Premier League	21	8	0	0	—		—		21	8
Voždovac	2019–20	Serbian SuperLiga	12	4	1	0	—		—		13	4
Sabah	2019–20	Azerbaijan Premier League	3	1	0	0	—		—		3	1
Career total			402	142	25	11	53	16	1	0	481	169

=== International ===
Appearances and goals by national team and year
National team	Year	Apps	Goals
Ukraine	2008	1	0
Ukraine	2009	1	0
Ukraine	2010	5	0
Ukraine	2011	10	2
Ukraine	2012	11	0
Ukraine	2013	5	4
Ukraine	2014	2	1
Total		35	7

Scores and results list Ukraine's goal tally first, score column indicates score after each Dević goal.

List of international goals scored by Marko Dević
No.	Date	Venue	Opponent	Score	Result	Competition
1	9 February 2011	GSP Stadium, Nicosia, Cyprus	Sweden	1–1	1–1	Friendly
2	15 November 2011	Arena Lviv, Lviv, Ukraine	Austria	2–1	2–1	Friendly
3	6 September 2013	Arena Lviv, Lviv, Ukraine	San Marino	1–0	9–0	2014 FIFA World Cup qualification
4	15 October 2013	Stadio Olimpico, Serravalle, San Marino	San Marino	2–0	8–0	2014 FIFA World Cup qualification
5	15 October 2013	Stadio Olimpico, Serravalle, San Marino	San Marino	4–0	8–0	2014 FIFA World Cup qualification
6	15 October 2013	Stadio Olimpico, Serravalle, San Marino	San Marino	6–0	8–0	2014 FIFA World Cup qualification
7	5 March 2014	Antonis Papadopoulos Stadium, Larnaca, Cyprus	United States	2–0	2–0	Friendly

== Honours ==
Radnički Beograd

- Second League of Serbia and Montenegro: 2003–04

Shakhtar Donetsk

- Ukrainian Premier League: 2012–13
- Ukrainian Cup: 2012–13
- Ukrainian Super Cup: 2012

Al-Rayyan

- Qatari Second Division: 2014–15

Vaduz

- Liechtenstein Football Cup: 2017–18

Individual

- Ukraine Premier League Top Scorer: 2007–08
- Oleh Blokhin club
