= Jonatan Maidana =

Argentine footballer (born 1985)

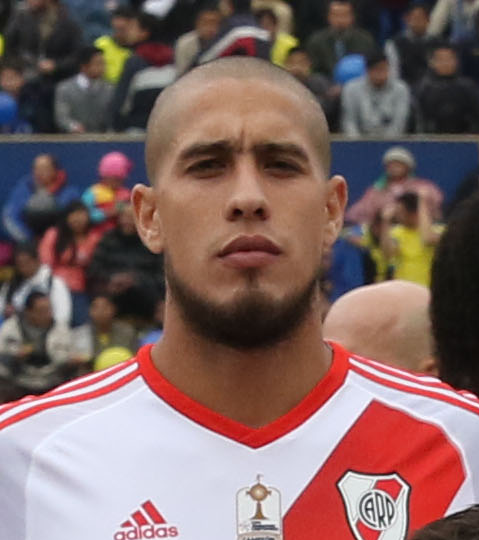
- Maidana with River Plate in 2016

Personal information
- Full name: Jonatan Ramón Maidana
- Date of birth: 29 July 1985 (age 41)
- Place of birth: Adrogué, Buenos Aires, Argentina
- Height: 1.85 m (6 ft 1 in)
- Position: Centre-back

Youth career
- Los Andes

Senior career*
Years	Team	Apps	(Gls)
2004–2005	Los Andes	37	(3)
2005–2008	Boca Juniors	44	(0)
2008–2010	Metalist Kharkiv	34	(0)
2010	→ Banfield (loan)	13	(0)
2010–2019	River Plate	196	(4)
2019–2020	Toluca	43	(3)
2021–2024	River Plate	27	(0)

International career
2005	Argentina U20	1	(1)
2011–2016	Argentina	5	(0)
- * Club domestic league appearances and goals

Jonatan Ramón Maidana (born 29 July 1985) is an Argentine former professional footballer who played as a centre-back. Maidana is one of the two players to have won the Copa Libertadores with rival clubs River Plate and Boca Juniors. At River Plate, he is the player with the most honours alongside Leonardo Ponzio.

== Club career ==
After an initial period in Los Andes, Maidana transferred to Boca Juniors and made his debut with a 9-minute substitute appearance in a 2–2 draw with São Paulo F.C. in the 2006 Recopa Sudamericana.

On 31 August 2008, Metalist Kharkiv secured Maidana's transfer for $3.15 million. Two years later, in January 2010, he was loaned to reigning Argentine champions Banfield.

After six months in Banfield, Maidana joined River Plate, rivals of his former team Boca Juniors. Maidana first goal for River was the winning goal in the 1–0 victory over Boca for the 2010 Apertura's Superclásico.

In January 2019, Maidana signed for Mexican side Toluca. On 18 December 2020, he left Toluca.

On 13 February 2021, Maidana agreed his return to River Plate.

== International career ==
Maidana represented the Argentina national under-20 football team. In 2008, he made his debut for the U-23 team in an unofficial friendly against Guatemala, scoring in the 5–0 victory.

== Career statistics ==
=== Club ===
As of match played 22 June 2023

Appearances and goals by club, season and competition
Club	Season	League			National Cup		Continental (Note: Includes the Copa Libertadores, Copa Sudamericana and UEFA Europa League.)		Other (Note: Includes the FIFA Club World Cup, Recopa Sudamericana and Supercopa Argentina.)		Total	
Club	Season	Division	Apps	Goals	Apps	Goals	Apps	Goals	Apps	Goals	Apps	Goals
Los Andes	2004–05	Primera B Metropolitana	37	3	0	0	–		–		37	3
Boca Juniors	2005–06	Argentine Primera División	0	0	0	0	0	0	–		0	0
Boca Juniors	2006–07	Argentine Primera División	16	0	0	0	7	1	–		23	1
Boca Juniors	2007–08	Argentine Primera División	28	0	0	0	15	0	–		43	0
Boca Juniors	Total		44	0	0	0	22	1	–		66	1
Metalist	2008–09	Ukrainian Premier League	20	0	3	0	10	0	–		33	0
Metalist	2009–10	Ukrainian Premier League	14	0	1	0	4	0	–		19	0
Metalist	Total		34	0	4	0	14	0	–		29	0
Banfield (loan)	2009–10	Argentine Primera División	13	0	0	0	8	0	0	0	21	0
River Plate	2010–11	Argentine Primera División	34	3	0	0	0	0	0	0	34	3
River Plate	2011–12	Primera Nacional	36	0	0	0	0	0	0	0	36	0
River Plate	2012–13	Argentine Primera División	14	0	0	0	0	0	0	0	14	0
River Plate	2013–14	Argentine Primera División	29	0	1	0	5	1	0	0	35	1
River Plate	2014	Argentine Primera División	15	0	0	0	4	0	1	0	20	0
River Plate	2015	Argentine Primera División	16	0	1	0	14	1	4	0	35	1
River Plate	2016	Argentine Primera División	11	0	0	0	4	0	2	0	17	0
River Plate	2016–17	Argentine Primera División	22	1	5	0	3	0	1	0	31	1
River Plate	2017–18	Argentine Primera División	14	0	6	2	11	0	1	0	32	2
River Plate	2018–19	Argentine Primera División	5	0	3	0	7	0	1	0	16	0
River Plate	Total		196	4	16	2	48	2	10	0	270	8
Toluca	2018–19	Liga MX	10	0	0	0	2	0	0	0	12	0
Toluca	2019–20	Liga MX	21	2	4	0	0	0	0	0	25	2
Toluca	2020–21	Liga MX	12	1	0	0	0	0	0	0	12	1
Toluca	Total		43	3	4	0	2	0	0	0	49	3
River Plate	2021	Argentine Primera División	13	0	1	0	4	0	0	0	18	0
River Plate	2022	Argentine Primera División	7	0	3	0	2	0	0	0	12	0
River Plate	2023	Argentine Primera División	5	0	1	0	0	0	0	0	6	0
River Plate	Total		25	0	5	0	6	0	0	0	36	0
Career total			392	10	29	2	100	3	10	0	531	15

== Honours ==
Boca Juniors

- Copa Sudamericana: 2005
- Recopa Sudamericana: 2006
- Argentine Primera División: 2006 Clausura, 2008 Apertura
- Copa Libertadores: 2007

River Plate

- Primera B Nacional: 2011–12
- Argentine Primera División: 2014 Final, 2023
- Copa Campeonato: 2013–14
- Copa Sudamericana: 2014
- Recopa Sudamericana: 2015, 2016
- Copa Libertadores: 2015, 2018
- Suruga Bank Championship: 2015
- Copa Argentina: 2016, 2017
- Supercopa Argentina: 2017, 2019; runner-up: 2014, 2016
- Trofeo de Campeones: 2021, 2023
- FIFA Club World Cup runner-up: 2015

Argentina

- Copa América runner-up: 2016
- Superclásico de las Américas: 2017
