= Denys Oliynyk =

Ukrainian footballer

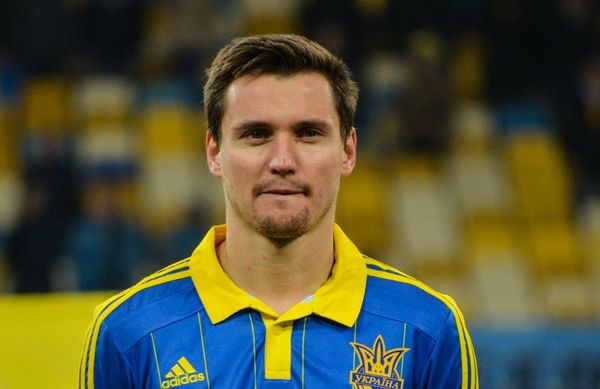
- Oliynyk with the Ukraine national team in 2014

Personal information
- Full name: Denys Viktorovych Oliynyk
- Date of birth: 16 June 1987 (age 39)
- Place of birth: Zaporizhzhia, Soviet Union (now Ukraine)
- Height: 1.78 m (5 ft 10 in)
- Position: Left winger

Team information
- Current team: Avanhard Lozova

Youth career
- 2004: Dynamo Kyiv

Senior career*
Years	Team	Apps	(Gls)
2004–2008	Dynamo Kyiv	3	(1)
2004–2005	→ Dynamo-3 Kyiv	25	(4)
2005–2008	→ Dynamo-2 Kyiv	54	(16)
2007	→ Naftovyk-Ukrnafta Okhtyrka (loan)	14	(1)
2008	→ Arsenal Kyiv (loan)	16	(5)
2009–2011	Metalist Kharkiv	68	(21)
2011–2014	Dnipro	37	(9)
2014–2016	Vitesse	56	(8)
2016–2017	Darmstadt 98	4	(1)
2017	Desna Chernihiv	6	(0)
2018	Helios Kharkiv	4	(0)
2018–2022	SJK	94	(23)
2021	→ SJK II	2	(2)
2022–2023	Vorskla Poltava	23	(2)
2023–2024	LNZ Cherkasy	35	(3)
2025–	Avanhard Lozova	0	(0)

International career^{‡}
2002–2003	Ukraine U16	12	(2)
2003–2004	Ukraine U17	15	(2)
2003–2004	Ukraine U18	5	(0)
2005	Ukraine U19	1	(0)
2006–2008	Ukraine U21	18	(5)
2010–2015	Ukraine	12	(0)
- * Club domestic league appearances and goals as of 28 October 2024 ‡ National team caps and goals as of 2 November 2021

Denys Viktorovych Oliynyk (Ukrainian: Денис Вікторович Олійник; born 16 June 1987) is a Ukrainian former professional footballer who played as a left winger for Avanhard Lozova.

Oliynyk also played for the Ukraine under-21 national team and the Ukraine senior team.

== Club career ==
=== Dynamo Kyiv ===
Born in Zaporizhia, Ukrainian Soviet Socialist Republic, Oliynyk joined Dynamo Kyiv in 2004. There he was featured frequently in Dynamo-3, Dynamo-2 and the reserve squad of the main team. Although Oliynyk played two matches for Dynamo's senior squad in the 2006–07 season, he was not officially promoted to the main team until in May 2008 after the end of the 2007–08 season by new coach Yuri Semin.

=== Naftovyk-Ukrnafta Okhtyrka (loan) ===
For part of the 2007–08 season, Oliynyk was loaned to then-Ukrainian Premier League club Naftovyk-Ukrnafta Okhtyrka. He stayed there until the end of the 2007 calendar year.

=== Arsenal Kyiv (loan) ===
For the first half of the 2008–09 season, Oliynyk was loaned, alongside teammate Vitaliy Mandzyuk, to Arsenal Kyiv in July 2008. His time with Arsenal was extremely impressive as he quickly became one of the leaders of the midfield and attack.

=== Metalist Kharkiv ===
Seeking to strengthen his team for the 2008–09 UEFA Cup, Metalist Kharkiv coach Myron Markevych purchased Oliynyk during the winter transfer season. Oliynyk established himself in the squad and played in the UEFA Cup and in the Ukrainian Premier League.

=== Dnipro Dnipropetrovsk ===
In July 2011, Oliynyk changed club to join fellow Premier League side Dnipro Dnipropetrovsk.

=== Vitesse Arnhem ===
On 26 May 2014, Oliynyk signed a two-year contract at Dutch Eredivisie club Vitesse.

=== Darmstadt ===
On 9 August 2016, Oliynyk joined German Bundesliga side Darmstadt 98.

=== LNZ Cherkasy ===
In 2023, he moved to newly promoted Ukrainian Premier League club LNZ Cherkasy. In January 2025, he announced his retirement from professional football.

=== Avanhard Lozova ===
In summer 2025 he signed for Avanhard Lozova.

== Personal life ==
His father Viktor Oliynyk is a legendary player of Bukovyna Chernivtsi. His godfather is another legendary Bukovyna Chernivtsi player Valeriy Korolyanchuk, whose son Andriy Korolyanchuk is also a football player. He is married, and has a son and a daughter, whose godfather is the famous Ukrainian football player Yevhen Konoplyanka.

== Career statistics ==
=== Club ===
Appearances and goals by club, season and competition
Club	Season	League			Cup (Note: Includes Ukrainian Cup, Suomen Cup)		Europe		Other		Total	
Club	Season	Division	Apps	Goals	Apps	Goals	Apps	Goals	Apps	Goals	Apps	Goals
Dynamo-3 Kyiv	2004–05	Ukrainian Second League	25	4	–		–		–		25	4
Dynamo-2 Kyiv	2004–05	Ukrainian First League	1	0	–		–		–		1	0
Dynamo-2 Kyiv	2005–06	Ukrainian First League	22	3	–		–		–		22	3
Dynamo-2 Kyiv	2006–07	Ukrainian First League	25	11	–		–		–		25	11
Dynamo-2 Kyiv	2007–08	Ukrainian First League	6	2	–		–		–		6	2
Dynamo-2 Kyiv	Total		54	16	0	0	0	0	0	0	54	16
Dynamo Kyiv	2006–07	Ukrainian Premier League	2	0	1	1	–		–		3	1
Dynamo Kyiv	2007–08	Ukrainian Premier League	1	1	0	0	–		1 (Note: Appearance(s) in Ukrainian Super Cup)	0	2	1
Dynamo Kyiv	Total		3	1	1	1	0	0	1	0	5	2
Naftovyk-Ukrnafta Okhtyrka (loan)	2007–08	Ukrainian Premier League	14	1	–		–		–		14	1
Arsenal Kyiv (loan)	2008–09	Ukrainian Premier League	16	5	1	0	–		–		17	5
Metalist Kharkiv	2008–09	Ukrainian Premier League	12	0	2	0	4 (Note: Appearances in UEFA Cup)	1	–		18	1
Metalist Kharkiv	2009–10	Ukrainian Premier League	29	9	1	0	4 (Note: Appearances in UEFA Europa League)	2	–		34	11
Metalist Kharkiv	2010–11	Ukrainian Premier League	27	12	1	0	9	1	–		37	13
Metalist Kharkiv	Total		68	21	4	0	17	4	0	0	89	25
Dnipro Dnipropetrovsk	2011–12	Ukrainian Premier League	24	7	2	0	1	0	–		27	7
Dnipro Dnipropetrovsk	2012–13	Ukrainian Premier League	13	2	1	0	1	0	–		15	2
Dnipro Dnipropetrovsk	2013–14	Ukrainian Premier League	0	0	0	0	–		–		0	0
Dnipro Dnipropetrovsk	Total		37	9	3	0	2	0	0	0	42	9
Vitesse	2014–15	Eredivisie	31	3	2	1	–		–		33	4
Vitesse	2015–16	Eredivisie	25	5	1	1	2	0	–		28	6
Vitesse	Total		56	8	3	2	2	0	0	0	61	10
Darmstadt 98	2016–17	Bundesliga	4	1	0	0	–		–		4	1
Desna Chernihiv	2017–18	Ukrainian First League	6	0	2	1	–		–		8	1
Helios Kharkiv	2017–18	Ukrainian First League	4	0	–		–		–		4	0
SJK Seinäjoki	2018	Veikkausliiga	13	4	–		–		–		13	4
SJK Seinäjoki	2019	Veikkausliiga	25	8	5	2	–		–		30	10
SJK Seinäjoki	2020	Veikkausliiga	20	2	5	0	–		–		25	2
SJK Seinäjoki	2021	Veikkausliiga	26	7	5	2	–		–		31	9
SJK Seinäjoki	2022	Veikkausliiga	10	2	2	2	0	0	5 (Note: Appearances in Finnish League Cup)	0	17	4
SJK Seinäjoki	Total		94	23	17	6	0	0	5	0	116	29
SJK Akatemia	2021	Kakkonen	2	2	–		–		–		2	2
Vorskla Poltava	2022–23	Ukrainian Premier League	23	2	0	0	2 (Note: Appearances in UEFA Conference League)	0	–		25	2
LNZ Cherkasy	2023–24	Ukrainian Premier League	24	3	1	0	–		–		25	3
LNZ Cherkasy	2024–25	Ukrainian Premier League	11	0	1	0	–		–		12	0
LNZ Cherkasy	Total		35	3	2	0	0	0	0	0	37	3
Career total			441	96	33	10	23	4	6	0	503	110

=== International ===
Ukraine
Year	Apps	Goals
2010	6	0
2011	3	0
2012	0	0
2013	0	0
2014	2	0
2015	1	0
Total	12	0

== Honours ==
Avanhard Lozova

- Ukrainian Amateur Cup: 2025–26

SBV Vitesse

- Beloften Eredivisie: 2015
