= Serhiy Valyayev =

Ukrainian footballer

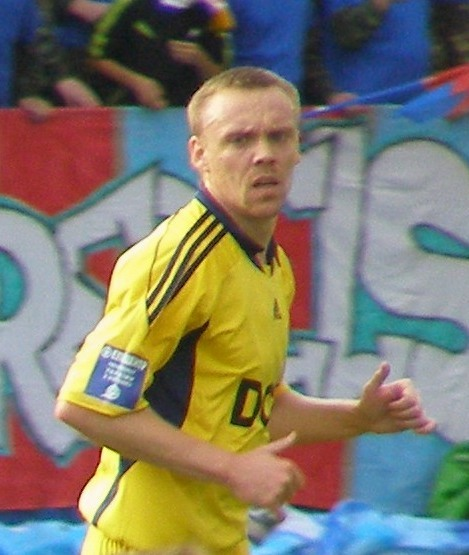

Personal information
- Full name: Serhiy Valentynovych Valyayev
- Date of birth: 16 September 1978 (age 48)
- Place of birth: Makiivka, Soviet Union
- Height: 1.81 m (5 ft 11 in)
- Position: Midfielder

Senior career*
Years	Team	Apps	(Gls)
1996–1997	Shakhtar Makiivka	1	(0)
1997–2003	Dnipro Dnipropetrovsk	100	(13)
1997–2003	→ Dnipro-2 Dnipropetrovsk	62	(20)
2001–2002	→ Dnipro-3 Dnipropetrovsk	3	(2)
2004	Kryvbas Kryvyi Rih	6	(0)
2005–2012	Metalist Kharkiv	137	(11)
2012	Hoverla Uzhhorod	1	(0)
2012–2013	Arsenal Kyiv	12	(0)
2013	Helios Kharkiv	7	(0)
Total		329	(46)

International career
2008–2009	Ukraine	3	(1)

Managerial career
- 2016: Nikopol-NPHU
- 2016–2018: Metalist Juniors
- 2018: Metalist 1925 Kharkiv
- 2020: Krystal Kherson
- * Club domestic league appearances and goals

Serhiy Valyayev (Ukrainian: Сергій Валентинович Валяєв; born 16 September 1978) is a retired Ukrainian football midfielder and manager.

== Club career ==
Valyayev become one of several footballers that were bought by Metalist Kharkiv in 2005 by the new manager Myron Markevych. Since then, the team has won three bronze titles in the Ukrainian championship.

== International career ==
Valyayev was called up to the national team of Ukraine when Metalist Kharkiv began having successes in UEFA Cup, finishing on top of their group. He was called up along with fellow team-mates Marko Dević and Valentyn Slyusar by Oleksiy Mykhailychenko for a friendly match against Norway on 19 November 2008. His second appearance for the team was significant, as he scored the opening goal in the tenth minute of a friendly match against Slovakia on 10 February 2009.

=== International goal ===
Scores and results list Ukraine's goal tally first.

No	Date	Venue	Opponent	Score	Result	Competition
1.	10 February 2009	Tsirion Athletic Center, Limassol, Cyprus	Slovakia	1–0	3–2	Cyprus International Football Tournament
