= Andriy Koval =

Ukrainian footballer

Personal information
- Full name: Andriy Koval
- Date of birth: 6 December 1983 (age 42)
- Place of birth: Bila Tserkva, Soviet Union
- Height: 1.89 m (6 ft 2 1/2 in)
- Position: Forward

Senior career*
Years	Team	Apps	(Gls)
2000–2002	Ros Bila Tserkva	44	(1)
2003–2005	Arsenal Kharkiv	67	(16)
2003–2004	→ Helios Kharkiv (loan)	7	(4)
2005	Kharkiv	6	(2)
2006–2008	Metalist Kharkiv	0	(0)
2009	Helios Kharkiv	11	(3)
2009	Zakarpattia Uzhhorod	1	(0)
2009–2010	Arsenal Bila Tserkva	23	(5)
2010	Naftovyk Okhtyrka	15	(1)
2011	Helios Kharkiv	3	(0)
- * Club domestic league appearances and goals

Andriy Koval (Ukrainian: Андрій Анатолійович Коваль; born 6 December 1983) is a Ukrainian former professional football striker. Played for Metalist in 2006–2008 season. Earlier played for FC Kharkiv.

Koval was born on 6 December 1983 in the city of Bila Tserkva, in the Ukrainian republic of the Soviet Union (in the Kyiv Oblast of present-day Ukraine).
