= Vladyslav Leonidov =

Ukrainian footballer

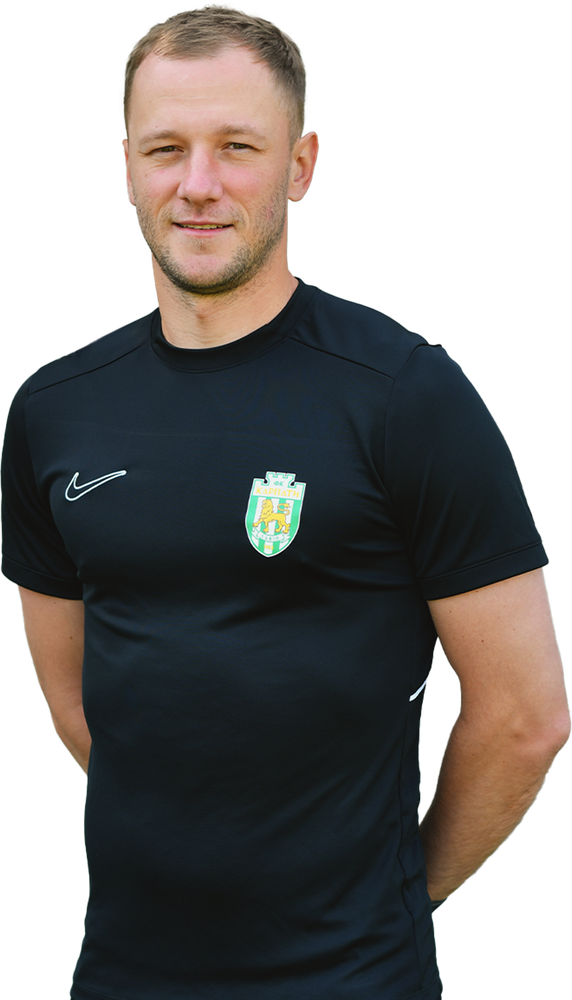

Personal information
- Full name: Vladyslav Valeriyovych Leonidov
- Date of birth: 11 February 1990 (age 36)
- Place of birth: Kharkiv, Ukrainian SSR
- Height: 1.82 m (6 ft 0 in)
- Position: Goalkeeper

Youth career
- 2003–2007: Metalist Kharkiv

Senior career*
| Years | Team | Apps | (Gls) |
| 2007–2012 | Metalist Kharkiv | 0 | (0) |
| 2008 | → Podillya Khmelnytskyi (loan) | 7 | (0) |
| 2012 | Odesa | 4 | (0) |
| 2013–2015 | Metalurh Zaporizhzhia | 0 | (0) |
| 2016 | Avanhard Kramatorsk | 10 | (0) |
| 2016 | Veres Rivne | 0 | (0) |
| 2017 | Bukovyna Chernivtsi | 0 | (0) |
| 2017 | Avanhard Kramatorsk | 2 | (0) |
| 2019–2020 | Metalurh Zaporizhzhia | 3 | (0) |
| 2020–2021 | Vovchansk | | |

International career^{‡}
| 2009 | Ukraine U19 | 1 | (0) |
| 2012 | Ukraine U21 | 1 | (0) |
- * Club domestic league appearances and goals as of 7 September 2020 ‡ National team caps and goals as of 20 November 2017

Vladyslav Valeriyovych Leonidov (Ukrainian: Владислав Валерійович Леонідов; born 11 February 1990) is a Ukrainian former professional football goalkeeper.

Leonidov is product of youth team systems of FC Metalist. He spent three months on loan in the Ukrainian Second League's club FC Podillya Khmelnytskyi.

== International career ==
He was called up to Ukraine national under-21 football team for the Euro 2013 qualification game against Slovenia on 6 September 2011.
