= Ihor Bazhan =

Ukrainian footballer

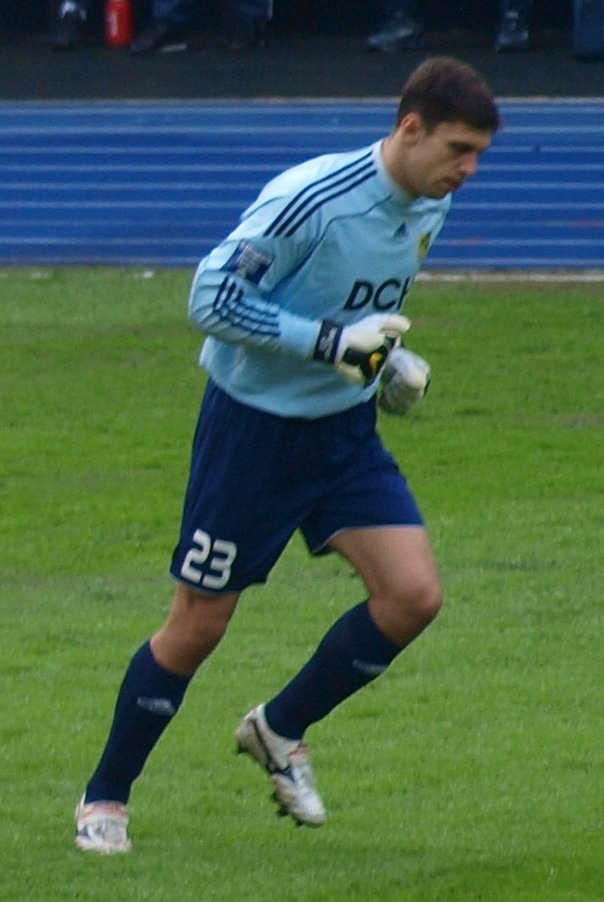

Personal information
- Full name: Ihor Mikolayovich Bazhan
- Date of birth: 2 December 1981 (age 44)
- Place of birth: Kirovohrad, Ukraine
- Height: 1.87 m (6 ft 1 1/2 in)
- Position: Goalkeeper

Youth career
- Zirka Kirovohrad

Senior career*
| Years | Team | Apps | (Gls) |
| 1997–2000 | Zirka-2 Kirovohrad | 34 | (0) |
| 2000–2001 | Zirka Kirovohrad | 32 | (0) |
| 2001–2003 | Tavriya Simferopol | 12 | (0) |
| 2003–2006 | Arsenal Kyiv | 45 | (0) |
| 2006–2007 | Kryvbas Kryvyi Rih | 23 | (0) |
| 2007–2008 | Zorya Luhansk | 14 | (0) |
| 2008–2010 | Metalist Kharkiv | 11 | (0) |
| 2010–2013 | Illichivets Mariupol | 13 | (0) |
| Total | | 184 | (0) |

Managerial career
- 2017–2018: Zirka Kropyvnytskyi (assistant)
- * Club domestic league appearances and goals as of 14 January 2014

Ihor Bazhan (Ukrainian: Ігор Миколайович Бажан; born 2 December 1981) is a professional Ukrainian football retired goalkeeper who played for FC Illichivets Mariupol in the Ukrainian Premier League. He is the product of the Zirka Youth School system. He moved to Metalist from Zorya during the 2008–09 summer transfer season.

== National team ==
During the 2002–03 season, Ihor Bazhan was called up to Ukrainian under-21 national football team, where he played one game.
