= Jajá Coelho =

Brazilian footballer

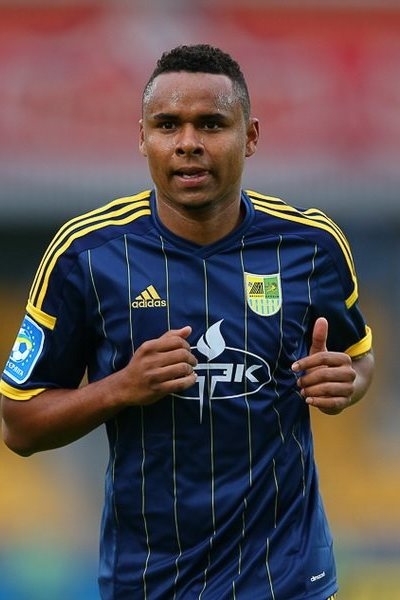
- Coelho with Metalist Kharkiv in 2014

Personal information
- Full name: Jakson Avelino Coelho
- Date of birth: 28 February 1986 (age 40)
- Place of birth: Ipatinga, Brazil
- Height: 1.90 m (6 ft 3 in)
- Position: Forward

Youth career
- América

Senior career*
Years	Team	Apps	(Gls)
2004–2005	Feyenoord	2	(0)
2005	→ Westerlo (loan)	30	(11)
2006–2007	Getafe	2	(0)
2006	→ Flamengo (loan)	5	(0)
2007	→ Racing Genk (loan)	5	(1)
2007	→ Westerlo (loan)	12	(4)
2008–2010	Metalist Kharkiv	61	(30)
2010–2011	Trabzonspor	29	(12)
2011–2012	Al-Ahli	25	(19)
2012	→ Internacional (loan)	16	(4)
2013–2014	Metalist Kharkiv	13	(6)
2013	→ Kayserispor (loan)	10	(3)
2014	→ Coritiba (loan)	7	(1)
2015	Chongqing Lifan	6	(2)
2015–2017	Lokeren	32	(8)
2017	→ Buriram United (loan)	34	(34)
2018	Muangthong United	26	(14)
2019	Seongnam	0	(0)
2020	Chiangrai United	8	(3)
Total		323	(152)
- * Club domestic league appearances and goals

Jakson Avelino Coelho (born 28 February 1986), commonly known as Jajá Coelho or simply Jajá, is a Brazilian former professional footballer who played as a forward.

== Career ==
=== Startings in Europe and loan deals ===
Jajá Coelho was born in Ipatinga. A youth product of América-MG, he arrived in Europe to sign for Dutch club Feyenoord in November 2004, but signed a loan deal with Westerlo immediately after his arrival to Rotterdam. Jajá joined Getafe in January 2006 after a year loan spell. After only two games for Getafe in second half of 2005–06 season, he was loaned to Flamengo in the second half of the 2006 season, and later signed a loan deal with Racing Genk in the 2nd half of the 2006–07 season. Finally, he was loaned out to Westerlo in the first half of 2007–08.

=== Metalist Kharkiv ===
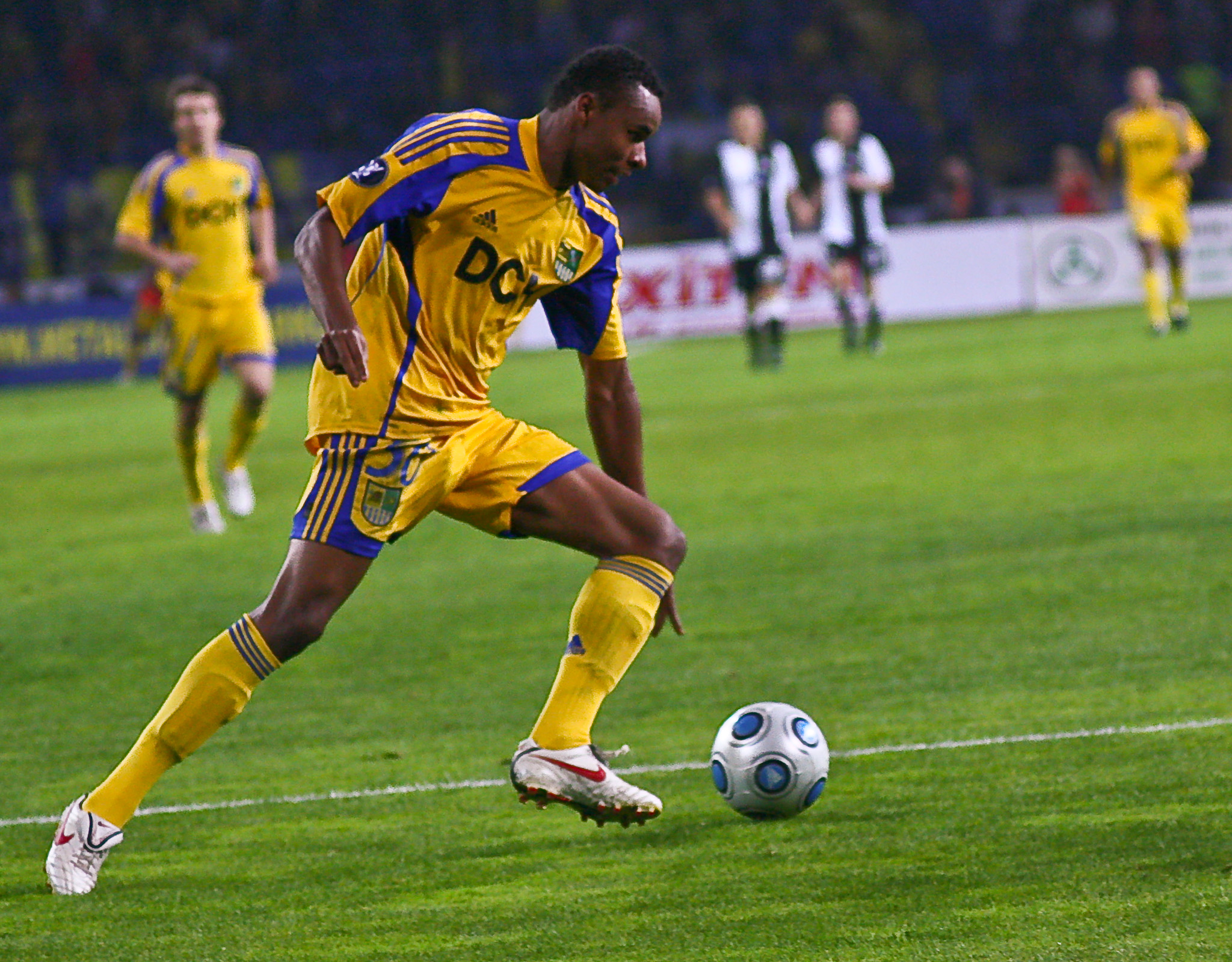
Jajá Coelho playing for Metalist Kharkiv

Jajá Coelho signed a three-and-a-half-year deal for Ukrainian club Metalist Kharkiv in February 2008. He scored a fantastic long-distance goal in an UEFA Cup match on 2 October 2008 against Beşiktaş from 40 metres. In 2008, he became the second foreigner that ever won the annual Ukrainian Premier League MVP award established by the sports newspaper Komanda, the other one was the former captain of Dynamo Kyiv Valyantsin Byalkevich from Belarus.

=== Trabzonspor ===
On 7 August 2010, Jajá Coelho joined Turkish club Trabzonspor on a four-year contract for reported €4.2 million. He made his full Super Lig debut on 30 August in a 0–0 draw against Antalyaspor. Jaja scored his first goal after three league games when he scored twice in a 7–0 win against Kasımpaşa. He was designated for the first time as TrabzonCell Player of the Month in November 2010. He made 29 appearances and scored 12 goals in the 2010–11 season.

=== Al-Ahli Dubai ===
On 24 June 2011, it was announced that Jajá Coelho would agree to terms on a three-year contract with UAE League giants Al-Ahli. In September the transfer was completed, for €4.5 million.

=== Metalist Kharkiv ===
On 14 January 2013, Jajá Coelho re-joined Ukrainian club Metalist Kharkiv for an undisclosed fee.

=== Kayserispor ===
On 12 July 2013, Jajá Coelho reached an agreement with Süper Lig side Kayserispor for a 1+3-year loan.

=== Chongqing Lifan ===
In February 2015, Jajá Coelho transferred to Chinese Super League side Chongqing Lifan.

=== Lokeren ===
The first half season of 2015–16 Jajá Coelho spent in Belgium Jupiler Pro League club Lokeren, netting 3 goals in 11 games.

=== Buriram United ===
On 14 January 2017, Jajá Coelho joined Thai club Buriram United.

=== Muangthong United ===
Jajá Coelho joined Thai club Muangthong United on a permanent contract from Lokeren. He played his first official match as a substitute in the 2018 AFC Champions League play-off against Johor.

== Career statistics ==
As of match played 18 November 2020

Appearances and goals by club, season and competition
Club	Season	League			National cup		League cup, State League		Continental		Total	
Club	Season	Division	Apps	Goals	Apps	Goals	Apps	Goals	Apps	Goals	Apps	Goals
Westerlo (loan)	2004–05	Belgian First Division	9	1	0	0	–		–		9	1
Westerlo (loan)	2005–06	Belgian First Division	18	10	2	1	–		–		20	11
Westerlo (loan)	Total		27	11	2	1	–		–		29	12
Getafe	2005–06	La Liga	2	0	0	0	–		–		2	0
Flamengo (loan)	2006	Série A	2	0	0	0	–		0	0	2	0
Genk (loan)	2006–07	Belgian First Division	9	1	2	0	–		–		11	1
Westerlo (loan)	2007–08	Belgian First Division	9	4	1	0	–		–		10	4
Metalist Kharkiv	2007–08	Vyshcha Liha	11	3	0	0	–		0	0	11	3
Metalist Kharkiv	2008–09	Ukrainian Premier League	23	11	2	2	–		10	4	35	17
Metalist Kharkiv	2009–10	Ukrainian Premier League	25	16	1	0	–		2	0	28	16
Metalist Kharkiv	2010–11	Ukrainian Premier League	2	0	0	0	–		0	0	2	0
Metalist Kharkiv	Total		61	30	3	2	–		12	4	76	36
Trabzonspor	2010–11	Süper Lig	29	12	1	2	–		1	0	31	14
Al-Ahli	2011–12	Etisalat Pro-League	5	1							5	1
Internacional (loan)	2012	Série A	16	2	0	0	9	2	5	0	30	4
Metalist Kharkiv	2012–13	Ukrainian Premier League	3	1	0	0	–		2	0	5	1
Metalist Kharkiv	2014–15	Ukrainian Premier League	10	5	2	1	–		6	0	18	6
Metalist Kharkiv	Total		13	6	2	1	–		8	0	23	7
Kayserispor (loan)	2013–14	Süper Lig	10	3	0	0	–		–		10	3
Coritiba (loan)	2014	Série A	7	0	0	0	0	0	–		7	0
Chongqing Lifan	2015	Chinese Super League	5	0	0	0	–		–		5	0
Lokeren	2015–16	Jupiler Pro League	20	3	1	0	–		–		21	3
Lokeren	2016–17	Jupiler Pro League	12	2	1	0	–		–		13	2
Lokeren	Total		32	5	2	0	–		–		34	5
Buriram United (loan)	2017	Thai League T1	34	34	4	3	3	2	–		38	37
Muangthong United	2018	Thai League T1	26	14	2	1	0	0	2	0	30	15
Chiangrai United	2020–21	Thai League T1	8	3	0	0	0	0	2	0	10	3
Career total			295	149	19	10	12	4	30	4	356	167
