= Maksym Yakhno =

Ukrainian footballer (born 1988)

Personal information
- Full name: Maksym Anatoliyovych Yakhno
- Date of birth: 3 April 1988 (age 38)
- Place of birth: Kharkiv, Ukrainian SSR
- Height: 1.78 m (5 ft 10 in)
- Position: Midfielder

Youth career
- 2001–2005: FC Metalist Kharkiv

Senior career*
Years	Team	Apps	(Gls)
2005–2013	FC Metalist Kharkiv	1	(0)
2005	FC Metalist-2 Kharkiv	4	(0)
2012	→ FC Lviv (loan)	2	(0)
2012	→ FC Sumy (loan)	0	(0)
2013	FC Helios Kharkiv	5	(0)

International career^{‡}
2005	Ukraine-17	1	(0)
- * Club domestic league appearances and goals as of 24 May 2013 ‡ National team caps and goals as of 24 May 2013

Maksym Yakhno (Ukrainian: Максим Анатолійович Яхно; born 3 April 1988) is a professional Ukrainian football midfielder who last time played for club FC Helios Kharkiv in the Ukrainian First League.

Yakhno is the product of the Metalist Kharkiv Youth School System. He made his debut for FC Metalist entering as a second-half substitute against FC Kharkiv on 26 May 2009 in Ukrainian Premier League.

He also played one match for Ukrainian national under-17 football team.
