= Valentyn Slyusar =

Ukrainian footballer

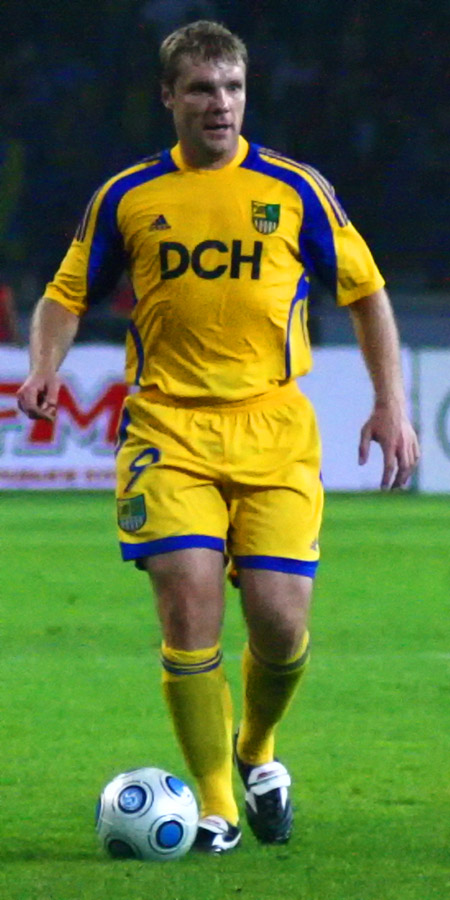

Personal information
- Full name: Valentyn Vasylovych Slyusar
- Date of birth: 15 September 1977 (age 49)
- Place of birth: Kyiv, Ukrainian SSR
- Height: 1.85 m (6 ft 1 in)
- Position: Midfielder

Senior career*
Years	Team	Apps	(Gls)
1994–1998	Dynamo Kyiv	0	(0)
1994–1998	→ Dynamo-2 Kyiv	63	(9)
1997–1998	→ Dynamo-3 Kyiv	17	(5)
1998	Metalurh Donetsk	13	(2)
1999	Rostselmash Rostov-on-Don	1	(0)
1999	→ Rostselmash-2 Rostov-on-Don	12	(0)
2000	Obolon Kyiv	4	(0)
2000	→ Obolon-2 Kyiv	9	(1)
2000–2002	Zakarpattia Uzhhorod	53	(5)
2001–2002	→ Zakarpattia-2 Uzhhorod	3	(2)
2002–2003	Polihraftechnika Oleksandriya	18	(2)
2003–2004	Nyva Vinnytsia	24	(4)
2004–2005	Zakarpattia Uzhhorod	29	(1)
2005–2010	Metalist Kharkiv	126	(16)
2010–2012	Obolon Kyiv	36	(0)
2016	Spartacus Uzhhorod		
2018–2019	Sevlyush Vynohradiv		

International career
2008–2009	Ukraine	2	(0)
Medal record
Men's football
Representing Ukraine
UEFA European Under-16 Championship
Third place	1994 Republic of Ireland
- * Club domestic league appearances and goals

Valentyn Slyusar (born 15 September 1977) is a former Ukrainian footballer who played as a midfielder.

== Club career ==
Slyusar is graduate of Dynamo Kyiv academy. Since then he has played for various Ukrainian First League clubs. He has also played for Russian club FC Rostov. Notably he has played for Ukrainian Premier League clubs FC Metalurh Donetsk, and Zakarpattia Uzhhorod.

In 2005, Slyusar came to Metalist who got new manager Myron Markevych. Since then he has one three bronze titles with the club in the Ukrainian Premier League.

After the Ukrainian Premier League 2008–09 season Slyusar was found positive in random drug testing and will be suspended for two months.

== International career ==
Slyusar was first called up to the Ukraine national football team by Oleksiy Mykhailychenko for a friendly match against Norway on 19 November 2008. The squad mainly consisted of domestic-based players, with the exception Vitaliy Fedoriv.

== Personal life ==
His son Denys, born in 2002, is also a football player.
