= Dmytro Zhdankov =

Ukrainian footballer (born 1984)

Personal information
- Full name: Dmytro Serhiyovych Zhdankov
- Date of birth: 18 November 1984 (age 41)
- Place of birth: Kharkiv, Ukrainian SSR, Soviet Union
- Height: 1.85 m (6 ft 1 in)
- Position: Goalkeeper

Youth career
- 1998–2000: Metalist Kharkiv

Senior career*
Years	Team	Apps	(Gls)
2000–2002	Metalist-2 Kharkiv	2	(0)
2003–2007	FC Hazovyk-KhGV Kharkiv	113	(0)
2008–2010	Metalist Kharkiv	1	(0)
2011–2013	Olimpik Donetsk	44	(0)

International career
2002	Ukraine U19	1	(0)
- * Club domestic league appearances and goals

Dmytro Serhiyovych Zhdankov (Ukrainian: Дмитро Сергійович Жданков; born 18 November 1984) is a Ukrainian former professional footballer who played as a goalkeeper. He is the product of the Metalist Youth School system.

== Club career ==
Raised in Metalist Youth School system, Dmytro Zhdankov failed to find a regular spot in the Metalist Reserves and thus in the beginning of 2003 moved to the Ukrainian Second League club FC Hazovyk-KhGV Kharkiv, where he found a regular spot and played there for until the winter of 2007–08 season when the removed themselves from competition. So, Zhdankov returned to his home club to continue playing for the Metalist Reserve squad for the rest of the season. For the 2008–09 season, Metalist coach Myron Markevych named him to be one of the three main goalies of the senior club.

== International career ==
During the 2002–03 season, Dmytro Zhdankov was called up to Ukrainian under-19 national football team, where he played one game.
