= Vitaliy Hodulian =

Ukrainian football referee

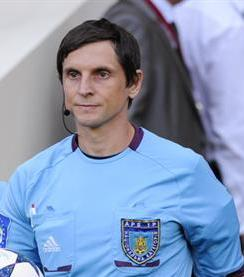
- Full name: Vitaliy Ivanovych Hodulian
- Born: 18 September 1968 (age 58); Odesa, Ukraine SSR

Domestic
Years	League	Role
1998-2013	Ukrainian Premier League	Referee

International
Years	League	Role
2001–2013	FIFA listed	Referee

Vitaliy Ivanovych Hodulian (Ukrainian: Віталій Іванович Годулян, born 18 September 1968 in Odesa, Ukraine) is a former Ukrainian professional football referee. He has been a full international for FIFA since 2001.
