= Venance Zézé =

Ivorian footballer

Zézéto
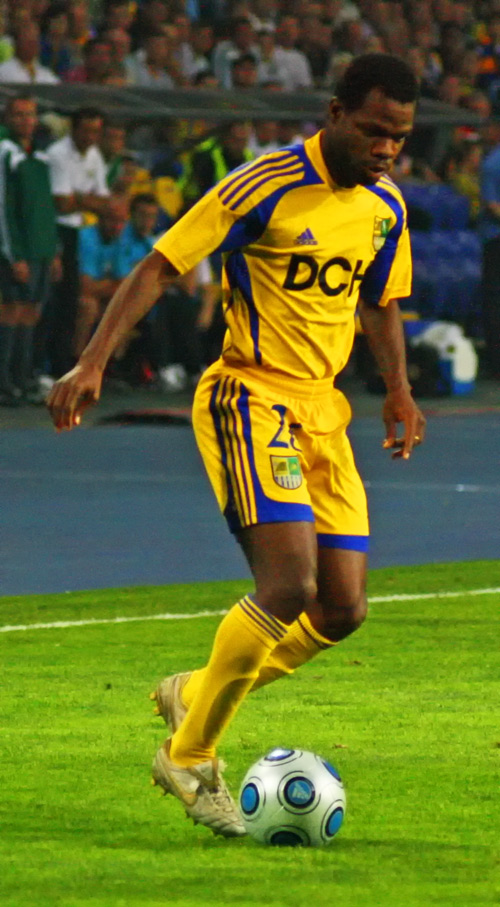

Personal information
- Full name: Venance Zézé
- Date of birth: 17 June 1981 (age 45)
- Place of birth: Abidjan, Ivory Coast
- Height: 1.69 m (5 ft 6 1/2 in)
- Positions: Midfielder; forward

Team information
- Current team: Séwé Sport

Youth career
- ASEC Abidjan

Senior career*
Years	Team	Apps	(Gls)
1999–2001	ASEC Abidjan		
2001–2003	KSK Beveren	62	(20)
2003–2004	AA Gent	29	(4)
2004–2005	Brussels	24	(1)
2005–2006	KSK Beveren	20	(3)
2006–2007	Metalurh Donetsk	24	(3)
2007–2011	Metalist Kharkiv	28	(4)
2010	→ FF Jaro (loan)	24	(7)
2011	FF Jaro	21	(3)
2012	AC Oulu	22	(6)
2013–2014	FC Haka	38	(11)
2014–	Séwé Sport	?	(?)

International career
2000–2001	Ivory Coast	7	(1)
- * Club domestic league appearances and goals as of 4 September 2012

Venance Zézé, nicknamed Zézéto, (born 17 June 1981 in Abidjan), is an Ivorian footballer who currently plays for Séwé Sport.

== International ==
He has been capped by the Ivorian national side.

== Career ==
Like many successful Ivorian footballers, he is a product of the famed youth academy at ASEC Abidjan, where he began his career. As a 17-year-old, Zézé scored twice for ASEC Abidjan in the 1999 CAF Super Cup final against Espérance de Tunis. Following this, he moved to Belgian side K.S.K. Beveren in 2001, where he starred with other Ivorians such as Yaya Touré and Gilles Yapi Yapo. He left Beveren in 2003 to join AA Gent, where he spent a season before moving to Brussels. In 2005, he returned to his former club Beveren for another season, before moving to Ukrainian side FC Metalurh Donetsk in 2006. After a successful loan to Metalurh's Vyscha Liga rivals FC Metalist Kharkiv in the first half of the 2007/08 season, a permanent transfer was agreed between the clubs on 14 December 2007. His contract with FF Jaro was revoked on 22 September 2011.

== Clubs ==
- – 2001 ASEC Abidjan
- 2001–2003 K.S.K. Beveren
- 2003–2004 AA Gent
- 2004–2005 Brussels
- 2005–2006 K.S.K. Beveren
- 2006–2007 FC Metalurh Donetsk
- 2007–2011 FC Metalist Kharkiv
- 2010–2011 FF Jaro
- 2012 AC Oulu
- 2013 FC Haka
- 2014 FC Haka
- 2014– Séwé Sport
