= Oleh Derevinskyi =

Ukrainian football player and referee (born 1966)

Oleh Derevinsky
Personal information
- Date of birth: 17 July 1966 (age 60)
- Place of birth: Kyiv, Soviet Union
- Height: 1.80 m (5 ft 11 in)
- Position: Midfielder

Senior career*
Years	Team	Apps	(Gls)
1983–1987	Dynamo Kyiv	0	(0)
1984–1985	→ Dynamo Irpin (loan)	18	(1)
1987–1991	Metalist Kharkiv	86	(1)
1991–1993	Wisła Kraków	28	(1)
1993–1995	Temp Shepetivka	36	(1)
1994	Zirka-NIBAS Kirovohrad	5	(0)
1995–1996	Metalurh Zaporizhia	39	(2)
1996–1997	Kryvbas Kryvyi Rih	17	(0)
Refereeing career
Domestic
Years	League	Role
1997–2012	Ukrainian Premier League	Referee
- * Club domestic league appearances and goals

Oleh Derevinsky (born 17 July 1966) is a Ukrainian former professional association footballer who played as a midfielder. After retiring as a player, he became a football referee.
