= Yevhen Herenda =

Ukrainian football referee

- Born: 11 April 1965 (age 61); Kalush, Ivano-Frankivsk Oblast, Ukrainian SSR

Domestic
Years	League	Role
2005–2010	Ukrainian Premier League	Referee

Yevhen Herenda (born 11 April 1965) is a Ukrainian former football referee.
