= Myron Markevych =

Ukrainian football manager (born 1951)

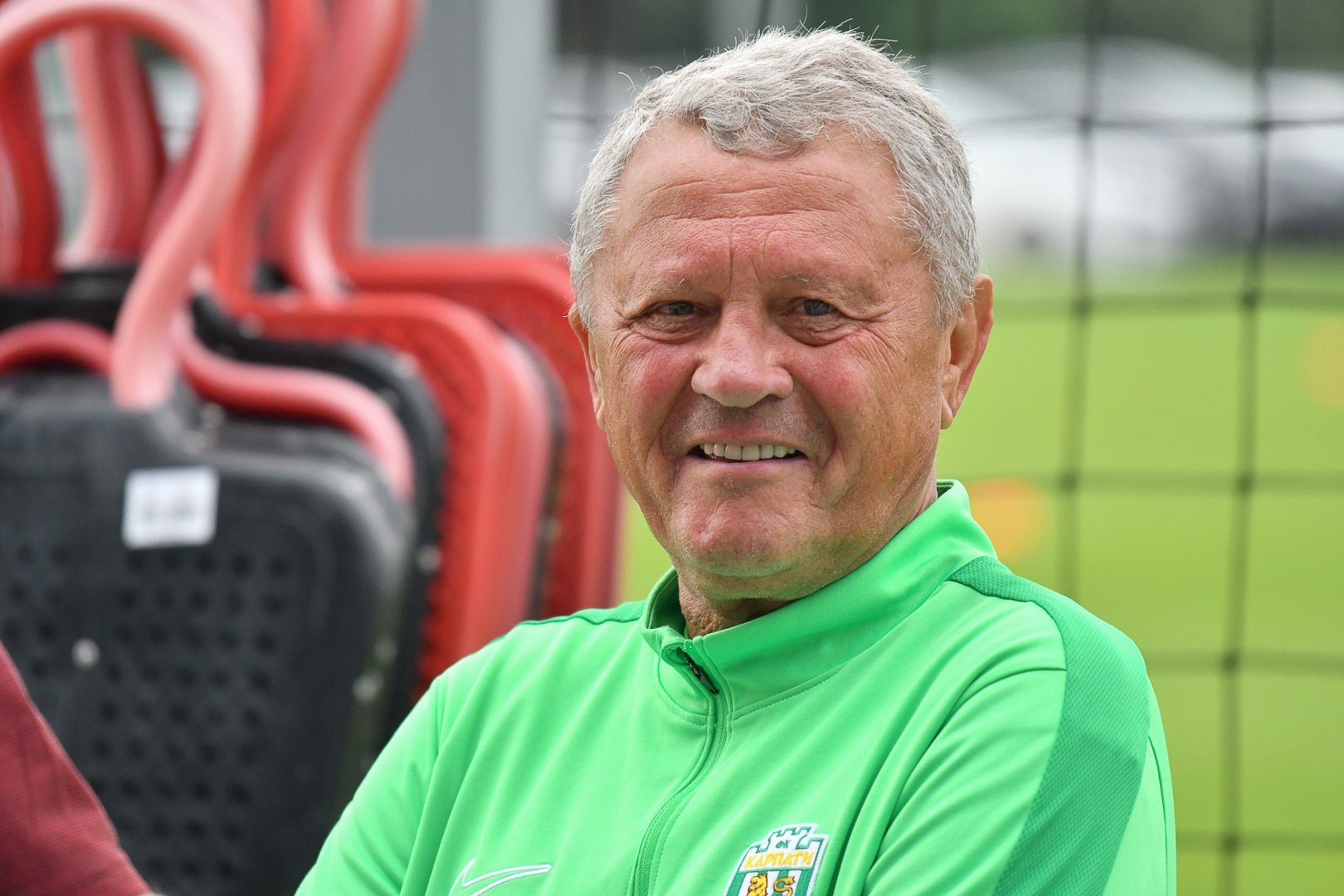
- Markevych in 2024

Personal information
- Full name: Myron Bohdanovych Markevych
- Date of birth: 1 February 1951 (age 75)
- Place of birth: Vynnyky, Ukrainian SSR (now Ukraine)
- Position: Midfielder

Senior career*
Years	Team	Apps	(Gls)
1971–1972	Karpaty Lviv	0	(0)
1973	SKA Lviv		
1974	Spartak Ordzhonikidze	0	(0)
1977–1978	Torpedo Lutsk	59	(7)

Managerial career
- 1978: Torpedo Lutsk (assistant)
- 1984–1987: Torpedo Lutsk
- 1988–1989: Podillya Khmelnytskyi
- 1990: Kryvbas Kryvyi Rih
- 1991–1992: Volyn Lutsk
- 1992–1995: Karpaty Lviv
- 1995: Podillya Khmelnytskyi
- 1996: Kryvbas Kryvyi Rih
- 1996–1998: Karpaty Lviv
- 1999–2001: Metalurh Zaporizhzhia
- 2001–2002: Karpaty Lviv
- 2002: Anzhi Makhachkala
- 2003–2004: Karpaty Lviv
- 2005–2014: Metalist Kharkiv
- 2010: Ukraine
- 2014–2016: Dnipro Dnipropetrovsk
- 2023–2024: Karpaty Lviv
- * Club domestic league appearances and goals

Myron Bohdanovych Markevych (Ukrainian: Мирон Богданович Маркевич; born 1 February 1951) is a Ukrainian professional football manager and former player. He last managed Karpaty Lviv.

He has worked as a manager in the Ukrainian Premier League and for the Ukraine national team. He holds the record for coaching the most matches in the Ukrainian Premier League (500 as of 15 August 2011).

A former midfielder, he made 59 appearances in the Soviet Second League for Torpedo Lutsk.

== Playing career ==
Markevych played as a midfielder for Karpaty Lviv (reserves), SCA Lviv, Spartak Ordzhinikidze, and Torpedo Lutsk.

== Coaching career ==
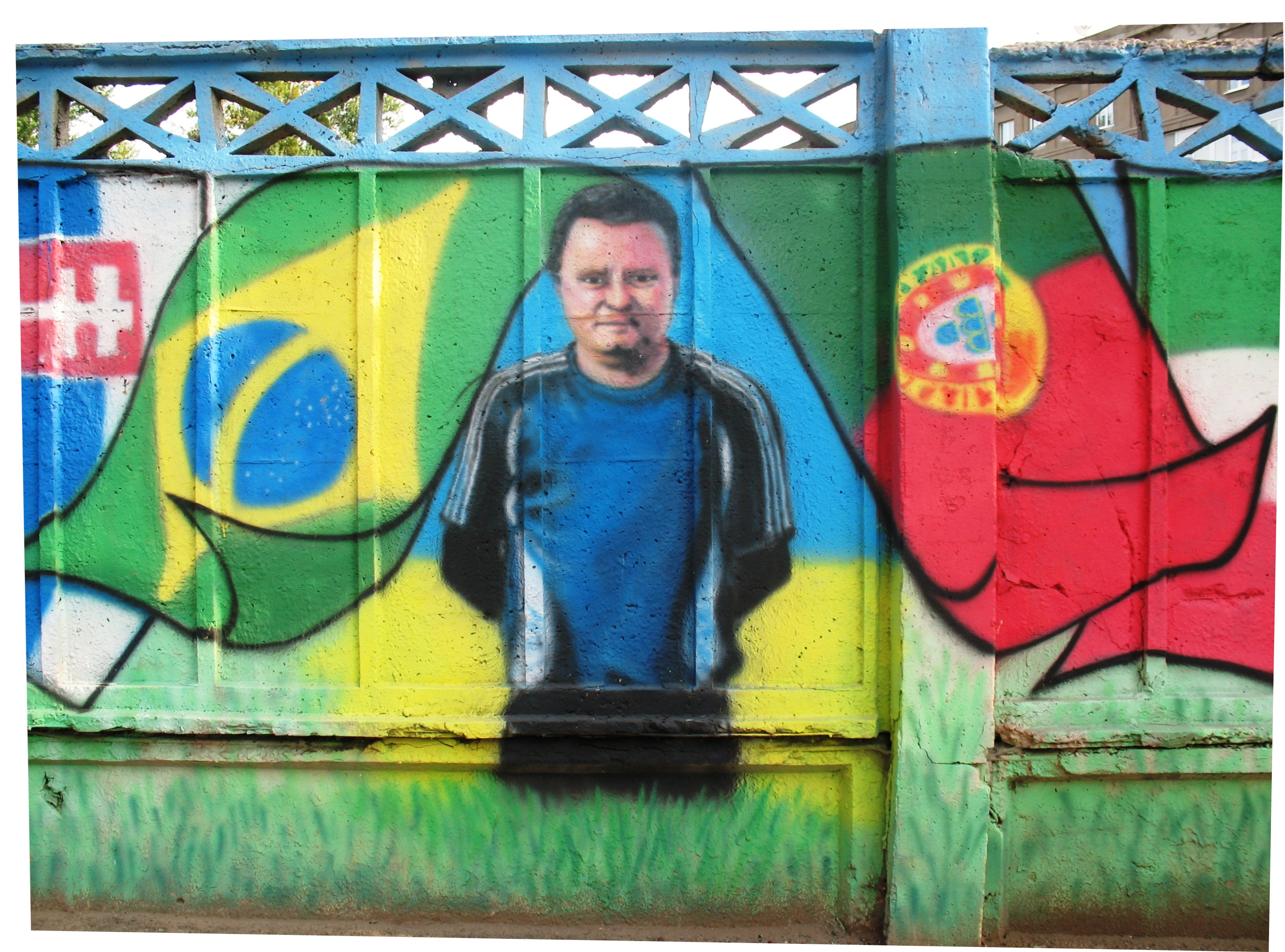
Graffiti of Markevych in Kharkiv, 2010

Markevych graduated from the Institute of Physical Education in Lviv and the Supreme school of coaches in Moscow in 1983. He has managed a number of teams, devoting most of his career to Karpaty Lviv and Metalist Kharkiv. He most notably served as manager of Dnipro Dnipropetrovsk, where he reached the 2015 UEFA Europa League final.

Markevych was appointed head coach of the Ukraine national team in early February 2010, but left six months later, submitting his resignation to the Football Federation of Ukraine (FFU) by fax on 21 August 2010. Initially, the legal department of FFU stated that such a document could only be submitted in its original form and the fax copy could not be accepted. Ultimately, the FFU accepted his resignation and appointed Yuriy Kalitvintsev as caretaker manager.

In June 2023, Markevych returned for the fifth time to Karpaty Lviv, but resigned a year later.

== Personal life ==
Markevych is of Polish descent by maternal grandfather. He is fluent in English and Polish. He is married and is the father of two sons, Ostap Markevych and Yuriy Markevych.

== Career statistics ==
Appearances and goals by club, season and competition
Club	Season	League			Cup		Europe		Other		Total	
Club	Season	Division	Apps	Goals	Apps	Goals	Apps	Goals	Apps	Goals	Apps	Goals
Spartak Ordzhonikidze	1974		—		1	0	—		—		1	0
Torpedo Lutsk	1977	Soviet Second League	36	4	—		—		—		36	4
Torpedo Lutsk	1978	Soviet Second League	23	3	—		—		—		23	3
Torpedo Lutsk	Total		59	7	—		—		—		59	7
Career total			59	7	1	0	—		—		60	7

== Managerial statistics ==
As of match played 11 April 2024

Managerial record by team and tenure
Team	Nat	From	To	Record				
Team	Nat	From	To	G	W	D	L	Win %
Torpedo Lutsk	(Soviet Union)	1984	1987	172	68	44	60	39.5
Podillia Khmelnytskyi	(Soviet Union)	1988	31 May 1989	67	32	13	22	47.8
Kryvbas Kryvyi Rih	(Soviet Union)	1990	30 April 1990	6	1	2	3	16.7
Volyn Lutsk	(Soviet Union) (Ukraine)	1991	June 1992	63	29	9	25	46.0
Karpaty	(Ukraine)	July 1992	June 1995	121	50	31	40	41.3
Podillia	(Ukraine)	18 August 1995	25 September 1995	11	4	5	2	36.4
Kryvbas	(Ukraine)	March 1996	June 1996	18	7	5	6	38.9
Karpaty Lviv	(Ukraine)	July 1996	December 1998	87	47	22	18	54.0
Metalurh Zaporizhzhia	(Ukraine)	March 1999	May 2001	73	30	19	24	41.1
Karpaty Lviv	(Ukraine)	July 2001	March 2002	22	10	5	7	45.5
Anzhi Makhachkala	(Russia)	June 2002	August 2002	9	1	2	6	11.1
Karpaty Lviv	(Ukraine)	August 2003	June 2004	21	3	5	13	14.3
Metalist Kharkiv	(Ukraine)	July 2005	February 2014	333	189	79	65	56.8
Ukraine	(Ukraine)	30 January 2010	21 August 2010	4	3	1	0	75.0
Dnipro Dnipropetrovsk	(Ukraine)	26 May 2014	30 June 2016	88	50	18	20	56.8
Karpaty Lviv	(Ukraine)	1 June 2023	18 July 2024	22	17	3	2	77.3
Total				1,117	541	263	313	48.4

== Honours ==
=== Manager ===
Karpaty Lviv

- Ukrainian Premier League third place: 1998
- Ukrainian Cup runner-up: 1992–93, 1998–99

Metalist Kharkiv

- Ukrainian Premier League runner-up: 2012–13; third place: 2006–07, 2008–09, 2009–10, 2010–11, 2011–12

Dnipro Dnipropetrovsk

- UEFA Europa League runner-up: 2014–15
- Ukrainian Premier League third place: 2014–15

Individual

- Top 50 Best Football Managers in the World according to FourFourTwo: 2015

== See also ==
- List of football managers with the most matches
