= 2008–09 FC Dynamo Kyiv season =

Dynamo Kyiv
2008–09 season
- Chairman: Ihor Surkis
- Manager: Yuriy Semin
- Premier League: 1st
- Ukrainian Cup: Semi-finals
- UEFA Champions League: Group stage
- UEFA Cup: Semi-finals
- Super Cup: Runners-up
- Top goalscorer: League: Two Players (13); All: Ismael Bangoura (19)
- Highest home attendance: 17,800 (vs Metalist Kharkiv, 12 March 2009, UEFA Cup)
- Lowest home attendance: 2,500 (vs Zorya Luhansk, 17 October 2008, UPL)
- Average home league attendance: 7,707
Home colours	Away colours

Following are the results of the 2008–09 FC Dynamo Kyiv season. FC Dynamo Kyiv (Ukrainian: ФК "Динамо" Київ) is a professional football club based in the Ukrainian capital city of Kyiv. Founded in 1927, the club currently participates in the Ukrainian Premier League and has spent its entire history in the top league of Soviet and later Ukrainian football. Dynamo Kyiv has won thirteen league titles, nine Ukrainian Cups, one UEFA Super Cup and two UEFA Cup Winners' Cups, and played three times in the semi-final of the UEFA Champions League.

== Season events ==
On 23 June, Dynamo announced the signing of Betão from Santos to a five-year contract.

On 27 June, Dynamo announced the signing of Frank Temile from Valletta to a five-year contract.

On 3 July, Dynamo announced the signing of Emmanuel Okoduwa from Germinal Beerschot to a five-year contract.

On 26 August, Dynamo announced the year-long loan signing of Roman Eremenko from Udinese.

On 2 October, Dynamo announced the signing of Kostyantyn Dudchenko from Olkom Melitopol to a five-year contract, with the transfer becoming official on 1 January 2009.

On 1 December, Dynamo announced that Vitaliy Fedoriv had joined Amkar Perm permanently, having initially joined the club on loan in August.

On 1 February, Dynamo announced the signing of Guilherme from Cruzeiro to a four-year contract, with Kléber moving in the opposite direction as part of the deal.

On 9 February, Dynamo announced that they had extended their loan deal with Malkhaz Asatiani from Lokomotiv Moscow until 31 May, with the defender having previously joined the club on loan in August.

On 24 April, Dynamo announced that Diogo Rincón had left the club after his contract was ended by mutual agreement.

On 19 May, Michael returned to Brazil, joining Botafogo on loan until December 2009.

On 22 May, Dynamo announced the permanent signing of Roman Eremenko from Udinese on a contract until 2014.

On 25 May, Dynamo announced that Valery Gazzaev would take over as Head Coach of the club from Yury Syomin, commencing 20 June.

== Squad ==
As of match played 26 May 2009

Number	Player	Nationality	Position	Date of birth (age)	Signed from	Signed in	Contract ends	Apps.	Goals
Goalkeepers
1	Oleksandr Shovkovskyi (Captain)	(Ukraine)	GK	2 January 1975 (aged 34)	Youth Team	1992		462	0
21	Taras Lutsenko	(Ukraine)	GK	1 February 1974 (aged 35)	Zakarpattia Uzhhorod	2005			
31	Stanislav Bohush	(Ukraine)	GK	25 October 1983 (aged 25)	Metalurh Zaporizhzhia	2008		36	0
55	Oleksandr Rybka	(Ukraine)	GK	10 April 1987 (aged 22)	Youth Team	2005			
Defenders
2	Oleh Dopilka	(Ukraine)	DF	12 March 1986 (aged 23)	Youth Team	2003			
3	Betão	(Brazil)	DF	11 November 1983 (aged 25)	Santos	2008	2013	44	0
6	Goran Sablić	(Croatia)	DF	4 August 1979 (aged 29)	Hajduk Split	2002			
15	Pape Diakhaté	(Senegal)	DF	21 June 1984 (aged 24)	Nancy	2007		45	1
17	Taras Mykhalyk	(Ukraine)	DF	28 October 1983 (aged 25)	CSKA Kyiv	2005		97	9
23	Oleksandr Romanchuk	(Ukraine)	DF	21 October 1984 (aged 24)	Desna Chernihiv	2005			
26	Andriy Nesmachnyi	(Ukraine)	DF	28 February 1979 (aged 30)	Youth Team	1997		306	12
30	Badr El Kaddouri	(Morocco)	DF	31 January 1981 (aged 28)	Wydad	2002			
32	Malkhaz Asatiani	(Georgia (country))	DF	4 August 1981 (aged 27)	on loan from Lokomotiv Moscow	2008	2009	19	1
Midfielders
4	Tiberiu Ghioane	(Romania)	MF	18 June 1981 (aged 27)	Rapid București	2001			
5	Ognjen Vukojević	(Croatia)	MF	20 December 1983 (aged 25)	Dinamo Zagreb	2008	2013	46	4
7	Carlos Corrêa	(Brazil)	MF	29 December 1980 (aged 28)	Palmeiras	2006			
8	Oleksandr Aliyev	(Ukraine)	MF	3 February 1985 (aged 24)	Borysfen Boryspil	2002		81	23
9	Mykola Morozyuk	(Ukraine)	MF	17 January 1988 (aged 21)	Youth Team	2005			
11	Roman Eremenko	(Finland)	MF	19 March 1987 (aged 22)	on loan from Udinese	2008	2009	35	2
19	Denys Harmash	(Ukraine)	MF	19 April 1990 (aged 19)	Youth Team	2007		0	0
20	Oleh Husiev	(Ukraine)	MF	25 April 1983 (aged 26)	Arsenal Kyiv	2003		195	31
36	Miloš Ninković	(Serbia)	MF	25 December 1984 (aged 24)	Čukarički	2004		81	7
37	Ayila Yussuf	(Nigeria)	MF	4 November 1984 (aged 24)	Union Bank	2004		110	11
50	Florin Cernat	(Romania)	GK	10 March 1980 (aged 29)	Dinamo București	2000			
70	Andriy Yarmolenko	(Ukraine)	MF	23 October 1989 (aged 19)	Desna Chernihiv	2007	2012	15	6
Forwards
10	Ismaël Bangoura	(Guinea)	FW	2 January 1985 (aged 24)	Le Mans	2007	2012	67	38
12	Frank Temile	(Nigeria)	FW	15 July 1990 (aged 18)	Valletta	2008	2013	2	0
16	Maksim Shatskikh	(Uzbekistan)	FW	30 August 1978 (aged 30)	Baltika Kaliningrad	1999		328	142
22	Artem Kravets	(Ukraine)	FW	3 June 1989 (aged 19)	Youth Team	2006		39	10
25	Artem Milevskyi	(Ukraine)	FW	12 January 1985 (aged 24)	Borysfen Boryspil	2002		163	45
33	Emmanuel Okoduwa	(Nigeria)	FW	21 November 1983 (aged 25)	Germinal Beerschot	2008	2013	0	0
49	Roman Zozulya	(Ukraine)	FW	17 November 1989 (aged 19)	Youth Team	2006		16	1
77	Guilherme	(Brazil)	FW	22 October 1988 (aged 20)	Cruzeiro	2009	2012	2	3
	Kostyantyn Dudchenko	(Nigeria)	FW	8 July 1986 (aged 22)	Olkom Melitopol	2008	2013	0	0
Away on loan
	Vitaliy Mandzyuk	(Ukraine)	DF	24 January 1986 (aged 23)	Youth Team	2004			
	Michael	(Brazil)	MF	16 February 1983 (aged 26)	Palmeiras	2007			
	Chahir Belghazouani	(France)	MF	6 October 1986 (aged 22)	Strasbourg	2007			
	Denys Oliynyk	(Ukraine)	MF	16 June 1987 (aged 21)	Youth Team	2004			
	Yevhen Shmakov	(Ukraine)	MF	7 June 1985 (aged 23)	Karpaty Lviv	2007			
	Māris Verpakovskis	(Latvia)	FW	15 October 1979 (aged 29)	Skonto	2003		74	20
	Volodymyr Lysenko	(Ukraine)	FW	20 April 1988 (aged 21)	Youth Team	2007			
Players who left during the season
38	Diogo Rincón	(Brazil)	MF	18 April 1980 (aged 29)	Internacional	2002		194	71
	Vitaliy Fedoriv	(Ukraine)	DF	21 October 1987 (aged 21)	Youth Team	2004			
	Kléber	(Brazil)	FW	12 August 1983 (aged 25)	São Paulo	2004		45	30

=== Coaching staff ===
Position	Staff
Head coach	(Russia) Yuri Semin
Assistant coach	(Ukraine) Oleh Luzhnyi
Assistant coach	(Russia) Sergei Ovchinnikov
Assistant coach	(Ukraine) Valeriy Zuyev
Goalkeeping coach	(Ukraine) Serhiy Krakovskiy
First team fitness coach	(Italy) Vincenzo Pinkolini
Dynamo-2 head coach	(Ukraine) Yuriy Kalitvynstev
Dynamo-2 head coach	(Ukraine) Gennadiy Litovchenko
Reserve and Youth team coach	(Ukraine) Volodymyr Muntyan
Club doctor	(Ukraine) Victor Berkovskyi
Club doctor	(Ukraine) Volodymyr Maliuta
Club doctor	(Ukraine) Andriy Shmorhun

Last updated: 8 Nov
Source: FC Dynamo Kyiv

== Transfers ==
=== In ===
Date	Position	Nationality	Name	From	Fee	Ref.
23 June 2008	DF	(Brazil)	Betão	Santos	Undisclosed	
27 June 2008	FW	(Nigeria)	Frank Temile	Valletta	Undisclosed	
3 July 2008	FW	(Nigeria)	Emmanuel Okoduwa	Germinal Beerschot	Undisclosed	
2 October 2008 (Note: Transfer announced on the shown date, becoming official on 1 January 2009.)	FW	(Ukraine)	Kostyantyn Dudchenko	Olkom Melitopol	Undisclosed	
1 February 2009	FW	(Brazil)	Guilherme	Cruzeiro	Undisclosed	
22 May 2009	MF	(Finland)	Roman Eremenko	Udinese	Undisclosed	

=== Loans in ===
Date from	Position	Nationality	Name	To	Date to	Ref.
26 August 2008	MF	(Finland)	Roman Eremenko	Udinese	30 June 2009	
30 August 2008	DF	(Georgia (country))	Malkhaz Asatiani	Lokomotiv Moscow	31 May 2009	

=== Out ===
Date	Position	Nationality	Name	To	Fee	Ref.
6 June 2008	MF	(Croatia)	Denis Glavina	Vorskla Poltava	Undisclosed	
1 December 2008	DF	(Ukraine)	Vitaliy Fedoriv	Amkar Perm	Undisclosed	
1 February 2009	FW	(Brazil)	Kléber	Cruzeiro	Part-Exchange	

=== Loans out ===
Date from	Position	Nationality	Name	To	Date to	Ref.
1 February 2008	MF	(Brazil)	Diogo Rincón	Corinthians	12 January 2009	
1 February 2008	FW	(Brazil)	Kléber	Palmeiras	15 January 2009	
26 June 2008	MF	(France)	Chahir Belghazouani	Strasbourg		
1 July 2008	DF	(Ukraine)	Vitaliy Mandzyuk	Arsenal Kyiv	2 March 2009	
1 July 2009	MF	(Brazil)	Michael	Santos	1 December 2008	
1 July 2008	MF	(Ukraine)	Denys Oliynyk	Arsenal Kyiv	30 June 2009	
18 July 2008	MF	(Ukraine)	Yevhen Shmakov	Arsenal Kyiv	30 June 2009	
22 July 2008	FW	(Ukraine)	Volodymyr Lysenko	Arsenal Kyiv	30 June 2009	
August 2008	DF	(Ukraine)	Vitaliy Fedoriv	Amkar Perm	1 December 2008	
19 May 2009	MF	(Brazil)	Michael	Botafogo	December 2009	

=== Released ===
Date	Position	Nationality	Name	Joined	Date	Ref.
25 June 2008	DF	(Serbia)	Marjan Marković	Red Star Belgrade	25 June 2008	
26 June 2008	DF	(Serbia)	Goran Gavrančić	Partizan	17 January 2009	
24 April 2009	MF	(Brazil)	Diogo Rincón	Kavala	24 July 2009	
31 May 2009	FW	(Uzbekistan)	Maksim Shatskikh	Lokomotiv Astana	19 June 2009	

== Friendlies ==
On 10 June, Dynamo announced that they would partake in eight Pre-Season friendlies. On 12 January, Dynamo announced that they will play three friendlies in Marbella between 16 and 29 January, followed by announcing a winter training camp in Cyprus on 2 February. Two days later, 4 February, Dynamo announced another three friendly matches to take place in Marbella.

16 June 2008	Dynamo Kyiv	5–0	Arsenal Kyiv	Kyiv
18:00 EEST (UTC+3)	Oliynyk 50'; Ghioane 37'; Milevskyi 55', 59'	Report		Stadium: Valeriy Lobanovskyi Dynamo Stadium

22 June 2008	Dynamo Moscow	1–1 (6–5 p)	Dynamo Kyiv	Moscow, Russia
18:00 EEST (UTC+3)	Danny 18'	Report	Aliyev	Stadium: Central Dynamo Stadium

26 June 2008	Dynamo Kyiv	2–1	Krylia Sovetov	Innsbruck, Austria
EEST (UTC+3)	Aliyev 3'; Lysenko 75'	Report	Salugin 58'

27 June 2008	Dynamo Kyiv	–	Rheindorf Altach	Innsbruck, Austria
EEST (UTC+3)

30 June 2008	Dynamo Kyiv	2–2	Wacker Innsbruck	Innsbruck, Austria
EEST (UTC+3)	Aliyev 11'; Shatskikh 53' (pen.) (red card) 90+1'; Fedorov (yellow card) 62'; Oliynyk (red card) 90+1'	Report	Unterrainer 16'; Gsellmann (yellow card) 52'; Schmid (yellow card) 60'; Schreter 75' (pen.)

2 July 2008	Dynamo Kyiv	2–3	CFR Cluj	Innsbruck, Austria
19:00 EEST (UTC+3)	Aliyev 3'; Kravets 87'	Report	Cadú 8' (pen.); Fabbiani 53'; Mureșan 85' (pen.)

5 July 2008	Dynamo Kyiv	–	Dyskobolia Grodzisk Wielkopolski	Innsbruck, Austria
EEST (UTC+3)

18 January 2009	Dynamo Kyiv	3–3	SpVgg Unterhaching	Marbella, Spain
EET (UTC+2)	Milevskyi 12'; Bangoura 25', 38'	Report	Konrad 13'; A.Fink 19'; Schulz 66'

22 January 2009	Dynamo Kyiv	2–0	Viking	Marbella, Spain
EET (UTC+2)	Milevskyi 34'; Shatskikh 83'	Report

5 July 2008	Dynamo Kyiv	0–4	Legia Warsaw	Marbella, Spain
EET (UTC+2)	Chinyama 17', 66'; Astiz 53'; Radović 81'	Report

6 February 2009	Dynamo Kyiv	1–0	Rubin Kazan	Marbella, Spain
18:00 EET (UTC+2)	Eremenko (yellow card) 21'; Aliyev 80'	Report	Appiah (yellow card) 55'

10 February 2009	Dynamo Kyiv	2–0	Sparta Prague	Marbella, Spain
17:00 EET (UTC+2)	Ninković 2'; Rincón 64'	Report

12 February 2009	Dynamo Kyiv	0–0	Esbjerg fB	Marbella, Spain
17:00 EET (UTC+2)	Aliyev (yellow card) 59'	Report

14 February 2009	Dynamo Kyiv	–	Dynamo Moscow	Marbella, Spain
16:00 EET (UTC+2)

2009	Dynamo Kyiv	–	Slovan Liberec	Cyprus
EEST (UTC+3)

2009	Dynamo Kyiv	–	Jablonec	Cyprus
EEST (UTC+3)

2009	Dynamo Kyiv	–	Vihren Sandanski	Cyprus
EEST (UTC+3)

2009	Dynamo Kyiv	–	Scotland	Cyprus
EEST (UTC+3)

== Competitions ==
=== Overall ===
Competition	First match	Last match	Starting round	Final position	Record							
Competition	First match	Last match	Starting round	Final position	Pld	W	D	L	GF	GA	GD	Win %
Premier League	19 July 2008	26 May 2009	Matchday 1	2nd	30	26	1	3	71	19	+52	86.67
Ukrainian Cup	13 September 2008	13 May 2009	Round of 32	Semi-final	4	3	0	1	11	2	+9	75.00
Super Cup	15 July 2008		Final	Runnersup	1	0	1	0	1	1	+0	0.00
UEFA Champions League	13 August 2008	9 December 2008	Second qualifying round	Group Stage	10	6	2	2	16	9	+7	60.00
UEFA Cup	18 February 2009	7 May 2009	Round of 32	Semi-final	8	2	4	2	11	9	+2	25.00
Total					53	37	8	8	110	40	+70	69.81

Last updated: 26 May 2009
Source: Results

=== Super Cup ===
15 July 2008	Shakhtar Donetsk	1–1 (a.e.t.) (5–3 p)	Dynamo Kyiv	Poltava
20:45 EEST (UTC+3)	Chyhrynskyi 14'; Srna (yellow card) 86'	Report	Ghioane (yellow card) 17'; Milevskyi 38'; Diakhaté (yellow card) 48'	Stadium: Vorskla Stadium; Attendance: 24,850; Referee: Wolfgang Stark (Germany)
	Penalties
	Fernandinho (penalty scored); Raț (penalty scored); Chyhrynskyi (penalty scored); Srna (penalty scored); Brandão (penalty scored)		(penalty scored) Yarmolenko; (penalty missed) Diakhaté; (penalty scored) Ninković; (penalty scored) Aliyev

=== Premier League ===
==== League table ====
Pos	Team	Pld	W	D	L	GF	GA	GD	Pts	Qualification or relegation
1	Dynamo Kyiv (C)	30	26	1	3	71	19	+52	79	Qualification to Champions League group stage
2	Shakhtar Donetsk	30	19	7	4	47	16	+31	64	Qualification to Champions League third qualifying round
3	Metalist Kharkiv	30	17	8	5	44	25	+19	59	Qualification to Europa League third qualifying round
4	Metalurh Donetsk	30	14	7	9	36	27	+9	49	Qualification to Europa League second qualifying round
5	Vorskla Poltava	30	14	7	9	32	26	+6	49	Qualification to Europa League play-off round

Source: uafootball.net.ua
Rules for classification: 1st points; 2nd overall wins; 3rd goal difference; 4th goals scored
(C) Champions

==== Results summary ====
Overall								Home						Away					
Pld	W	D	L	GF	GA	GD	Pts	W	D	L	GF	GA	GD	W	D	L	GF	GA	GD
30	26	1	3	71	19	+52	79	14	0	1	36	7	+29	12	1	2	35	12	+23

Last updated: 26 May 2009.
Source: Results

==== Results by round ====
Round	1	2	3	4	5	6	7	8	9	10	11	12	13	14	15	17	16	18	19	20	21	22	23	24	25	26	27	28	29	30
Ground	H	A	H	A	H	A	H	A	H	A	H	A	H	H	A	H	A	A	H	A	H	A	H	A	H	A	H	A	A	H
Result	W	W	L	D	W	W	W	W	W	W	W	W	W	W	L	W	W	W	W	W	W	W	W	L	W	W	W	W	W	W
Position	1	1	3	3	2	2	2	2	1	1	1	1	1	1	1	1	1	1	1	1	1	1	1	1	1	1	1	1	1	1

Updated to match(es) played on 26 May 2009. Source: Results
A = Away; H = Home; W = Win; D = Draw; L = Loss

==== Matches ====
19 July 2008 1	Dynamo Kyiv	2–0	Illychivets Mariupol	Kyiv
19:00 EEST (UTC+3)	Mykhalyk 2'; Milevskyi 66'; Vukojević (yellow card) 69'	Report	Vorobey (yellow card) 49'; Melnyk (yellow card) 69'	Stadium: Valeriy Lobanovskyi Dynamo Stadium; Attendance: 8,000; Referee: Yevhen Herenda

25 July 2008 2	Dnipro	1–3	Dynamo Kyiv	Dnipro
20:45 EEST (UTC+3)	Rotan (yellow card) 24'; Rusol (yellow card) 44'; Shershun (yellow card) 65'; Nazarenko 90+3'	Report	Vukojević (yellow card) 10'; Mykhalyk (yellow card) 12'; Ghioane 37'; Bangoura (yellow card) 37'; Milevskyi 44' (pen.), 82' (yellow card) 64'	Stadium: Meteor Stadium; Attendance: 14,000; Referee: Volodymyr Sirenko

2 August 2008 3	Dynamo Kyiv	1–2	Metalist Kharkiv	Kyiv
20:00 EEST (UTC+3)	Ninković 45+1'; Milevskyi (yellow card) 79'	Report	Gancarczyk (yellow card) 37'; Valyayev 38'; Slyusar (yellow card) 38'; Jajá 67'; Edmar (yellow card) 86'	Stadium: Valeriy Lobanovskyi Dynamo Stadium; Attendance: 12,500; Referee: Orest Shmigelsky

9 August 2008 4	Vorskla Poltava	2–2	Dynamo Kyiv	Poltava
19:00 EEST (UTC+3)	Yesin 34'; Curri 80'; Markoski (yellow card) 86'	Report	Vukojević (yellow card) 22'; Milevskyi 30'; El Kaddouri (yellow card) 45'; Bangoura 59'; Yarmolenko (yellow card) 87'	Stadium: Oleksiy Butovsky Vorskla Stadium; Attendance: 12,500; Referee: Vitaliy Hodulian

17 August 2008 5	Dynamo Kyiv	2–0	Metalurh Zaporizhzhia	Kyiv
20:30 EEST (UTC+3)	Bangoura 11'; Aliyev 45+1'; Milevskyi (yellow card) 55'	Report	Hodin (yellow card) 32'; Lazarovych (yellow card) 35'; Chelyadinsky (yellow card) 55'; Polyovyi (yellow card) 57'	Stadium: Valeriy Lobanovskyi Dynamo Stadium; Attendance: 8,650; Referee: Viktor Shvetsov

23 August 2008 6	Arsenal Kyiv	0–2	Dynamo Kyiv	Kyiv
20:30 EEST (UTC+3)	Zakarlyuka (yellow card) 45'; Yevseyev (yellow card) 82'	Report	Bangoura 2'; Ghioane 79'; Aliyev (yellow card) 82'; Bohush (yellow card) 84'	Stadium: Valeriy Lobanovskyi Dynamo Stadium; Attendance: 4,500; Referee: Igor Ishchenko

31 August 2008 7	Dynamo Kyiv	1–0	Metalurh Donetsk	Kyiv
20:30 EEST (UTC+3)	Bangoura 17'; Ninković (yellow card) 21'; El Kaddouri (yellow card) 57'; Mykhalyk (yellow card) 60'; Aliyev (yellow card) 68'; Vukojević (yellow card) 73'; Diakhaté (red card) 87'; Milevskyi (yellow card) 90+3'	Report	Kingsley (yellow card) 29'; Shyshchenko (yellow card) 72'; Fernandes (red card) 87'; Checher (red card) 87'	Stadium: Valeriy Lobanovskyi Dynamo Stadium; Attendance: 9,800; Referee: Volodymyr Sirenko

21 September 2008 8	Chornomorets Odesa	0–3	Dynamo Kyiv	Odesa
20:30 EEST (UTC+3)	Nizhegorodov (yellow card) 18'; Karytska (yellow card) 61'	Report	Eremenko 9'; Mykhalyk (yellow card) 17'; Ghioane 28'; Kravets 46'	Stadium: Chornomorets Stadium; Attendance: 6,500; Referee: Yevhen Herenda

26 September 2008 9	Dynamo Kyiv	3–0	Kryvbas Kryvyi Rih	Kyiv
20:30 EEST (UTC+3)	Aliyev 18', 47'; Ninković 27'	Report		Stadium: Valeriy Lobanovskyi Dynamo Stadium; Attendance: 6,850; Referee: Evgeniy Ambrosimov

4 October 2008 10	Kharkiv	0–4	Dynamo Kyiv	Sumy
17:00 EEST (UTC+3)	Hunchak (yellow card) 20'; Ivanov (yellow card) 20'; Komarnytskyi (yellow card) 39'; Sokolenko (yellow card) 51'; Nalepa (yellow card) 63'; Batista (yellow card) 90+1' (red card) 90+1'	Report	Mykhalyk (yellow card) 8'; Vukojević 58'; Sokolenko 60' (o.g.); Bangoura 64' (pen.), 87'	Stadium: Yuvileiny Stadium; Attendance: 15,500; Referee: Vitaliy Hodulian

17 October 2008 11	Dynamo Kyiv	5–0	Zorya Luhansk	Kyiv
19:00 EEST (UTC+3)	Bangoura 3', 15'; Aliyev 6'; Ghioane 11'; Zozulya (yellow card) 69' (goal) 79' (pen.); Romanchuk (yellow card) 82'	Report	Omoko (yellow card) 23'	Stadium: Valeriy Lobanovskyi Dynamo Stadium; Attendance: 2,500; Referee: Oleg Zubarev

25 October 2008 12	Tavriya Simferopol	1–3	Dynamo Kyiv	Simferopol
16:00 EEST (UTC+3)	Ljubenović (yellow card) 33'; Idahor 64'; Hajduczek (yellow card) 77'	Report	Bangoura (penalty missed) 7' 7'; El Kaddouri (yellow card) 21'; Diakhaté (yellow card) 35'; Milevskyi 54', 86' (penalty missed) 82'	Stadium: Lokomotiv Republican Sports Complex; Attendance: 10,500; Referee: Andriy Shandor

1 November 2008 13	Dynamo Kyiv	4–0	Karpaty Lviv	Kyiv
18:00 EET (UTC+2)	Milevskyi 18' (yellow card) 90+1'; Bangoura 25', 53'; Aliyev 45' (pen.)	Report		Stadium: Valeriy Lobanovskyi Dynamo Stadium; Attendance: 7,000; Referee: Viktor Shvetsov

9 November 2008 14	Dynamo Kyiv	1–0	Lviv	Kyiv
18:00 EET (UTC+2)	Aliyev (penalty missed) 13' (yellow card) 77'; Milevskyi (yellow card) 71'; El Kaddouri 75'	Report	Baranets (yellow card) 55'; Shevelyukhin (yellow card) 59'; Zhdanov (yellow card) 79'	Stadium: Valeriy Lobanovskyi Dynamo Stadium; Attendance: 6,000; Referee: Mikhail Rodionenko

16 November 2008 15	Shakhtar Donetsk	1–0	Dynamo Kyiv	Donetsk
16:00 EET (UTC+2)	Fernandinho (yellow card) 30'; Willian 34'; Brandão (yellow card) 52'; Kucher (yellow card) 86'	Report	Aliyev (yellow card) 36'; Sablić (yellow card) 73'; Bangoura (yellow card) 90+1'	Stadium: RSC Olimpiyskiy; Attendance: 21,000; Referee: Peter Fröjdfeldt (Sweden)

30 November 2008 17	Dynamo Kyiv	2–1	Dnipro	Kyiv
15:00 EET (UTC+2)	Vukojević (yellow card) 21'; Bangoura (yellow card) 48'; Betão (yellow card) 69'; Diakhaté 79'; Cernat 90'	Report	Rusol (yellow card) 72' (goal) 90+2'	Stadium: Valeriy Lobanovskyi Dynamo Stadium; Attendance: 4,800; Referee: Yevhen Herenda

5 December 2008 16	Illychivets Mariupol	3–4	Dynamo Kyiv	Mariupol
18:00 EET (UTC+2)	Kryvosheyenko 63' (pen.); Vorobey (yellow card) 65'; Ivashchenko 79'; Mykhalyk 86' (o.g.)	Report	Bangoura 16'; Milevskyi 24' (yellow card) 87'; Diakhaté (yellow card) 31'; Aliyev 39'; Mykhalyk (yellow card) 71'; Ghioane 75'; Zozulya (yellow card) 85'	Stadium: Volodymyr Boyko Stadium; Attendance: 8,400; Referee: Evgeniy Ambrosimov

4 March 2009 18	Metalist Kharkiv	0–2	Dynamo Kyiv	Kharkiv
18:00 EET (UTC+2)	Gancarczyk (yellow card) 28'; Obradović (yellow card) 28'; Edmar (yellow card) 44'; Gueye (red card) 54'; Slyusar (yellow card) 73'; Berezovchuk (yellow card) 83'	Report	Mykhalyk 17'; El Kaddouri (yellow card) 63'; Kravets 68'	Stadium: Metalist Oblast Sports Complex; Attendance: 26,000; Referee: Vitaliy Hodulian

8 March 2009 19	Dynamo Kyiv	4–1	Vorskla Poltava	Kyiv
18:00 EET (UTC+2)	Aliyev 16' (pen.), 64'; Ninković 30'; Kravets 68'	Report	Yaroshenko 34'; Markoski (yellow card) 75'	Stadium: Valeriy Lobanovskyi Dynamo Stadium; Attendance: 3,950; Referee: Yuriy Mozharovskyi

15 March 2009 20	Metalurh Zaporizhzhia	1–3	Dynamo Kyiv	Zaporizhzhia
16:00 EET (UTC+2)	Hodin 2'; Pisotskyi (yellow card) 19'; Zhuk (yellow card) 57'; Tsiharaw (yellow card) 59'	Report	Eremenko (yellow card) 25'; Ninković 59'; Milevskyi 70'; Corrêa 75'; El Kaddouri (yellow card) 88'	Stadium: Slavutych-Arena; Attendance: 12,000; Referee: Florian Meyer

23 March 2009 21	Dynamo Kyiv	3–0	Arsenal Kyiv	Kyiv
19:00 EET (UTC+2)	Kravets 21'; Aliyev 35', 71'	Report	Gusev (yellow card) 60'	Stadium: Valeriy Lobanovskyi Dynamo Stadium; Attendance: 5,500; Referee: Mikhail Rodionenko

5 April 2009 22	Metalurh Donetsk	0–2	Dynamo Kyiv	Donetsk
16:00 EEST (UTC+3)	Dišljenković (red card) 44'; Dimitrov (yellow card) 83'; Volovyk (yellow card) 86'	Report	Aliyev 45' (pen.); Vukojević 55'; El Kaddouri (yellow card) 66'	Stadium: Metalurh Stadium; Attendance: 4,500; Referee: Andriy Shandor

12 April 2009 23	Dynamo Kyiv	3–1	Chornomorets Odesa	Kyiv
18:00 EEST (UTC+3)	Nesmachnyi 3'; Yarmolenko (yellow card) 40'; Kravchenko 72'; Aliyev 85'	Report	Bondarenko 58'; Hryshko (yellow card) 80'	Stadium: Valeriy Lobanovskyi Dynamo Stadium; Attendance: 4,800; Referee: Oleg Zubarev

19 April 2009 24	Kryvbas Kryvyi Rih	2–1	Dynamo Kyiv	Kryvyi Rih
16:00 EEST (UTC+3)	Motuz 34'; Karpenko 42'; Shelayev (yellow card) 44'; Kostyshyn (yellow card) 67'; Hidi (yellow card) 87'; Bylykbashi (yellow card) 90+4'	Report	Ghioane 27' (yellow card) 45'; Kravchenko (yellow card) 83'	Stadium: Metalurh Stadium; Attendance: 9,000; Referee: Yuriy Grisyo

26 April 2009 25	Dynamo Kyiv	1–0	Kharkiv	Kyiv
18:00 EEST (UTC+3)	Ninković 10'	Report	Platon (yellow card) 13'; Komarnytskyi (yellow card) 64'; Fartushnyak (yellow card) 76'; Cheberyachko (yellow card) 79'	Stadium: Valeriy Lobanovskyi Dynamo Stadium; Attendance: 7,460; Referee: Mikhail Rodionenko

3 May 2009 26	Zorya Luhansk	0–1	Dynamo Kyiv	Luhansk
16:00 EEST (UTC+3)	Moldovan (yellow card) 72'	Report	Ghioane 52'; Zozulya (yellow card) 90+2'	Stadium: Avanhard Stadium; Attendance: 18,500; Referee: Evgeniy Ambrosimov

10 May 2009 27	Dynamo Kyiv	3–2	Tavriya Simferopol	Kyiv
18:00 EEST (UTC+3)	Eremenko (yellow card) 18'; Ghioane 55' (yellow card) 86'; Nesmachnyi 75'; Aliyev 90+2'	Report	Idahor 3' (yellow card) 35'; Monakhov (yellow card) 8' (goal) 57'; Holaydo (yellow card) 45+2'; Haliuza (yellow card) 77'	Stadium: Valeriy Lobanovskyi Dynamo Stadium; Attendance: 12,000; Referee: Ihor Pokydko

16 May 2009 28	Karpaty Lviv	1–4	Dynamo Kyiv	Lviv
16:00 EEST (UTC+3)	Tarasenko 90+2'	Report	Guilherme 37', 59', 71'; Eremenko (yellow card) 59'; Bangoura 83'	Stadium: Ukraina Stadium; Attendance: 16,200; Referee: Oleksandr Derdo

23 May 2009 29	Lviv	0–1	Dynamo Kyiv	Dobromyl
16:00 EEST (UTC+3)	Fedorchuk (yellow card) 81'; Romanyuk (yellow card) 87'	Report	Bangoura (yellow card) 57'; Morozyuk (yellow card) 58'; Ghioane 82'	Stadium: Lafort Arena; Attendance: 2,280; Referee: Volodymyr Sirenko

26 May 2009 30	Dynamo Kyiv	1–0	Shakhtar Donetsk	Kyiv
18:00 EEST (UTC+3)	El Kaddouri (yellow card) 14'; Aliyev (yellow card) 62'; Milevskyi 79'	Report	Hübschman (yellow card) 45'	Stadium: Valeriy Lobanovskyi Dynamo Stadium; Attendance: 15,800; Referee: Yevhen Herenda

=== Ukrainian Cup ===
13 September 2008 Round of 32	Olkom Melitopol	0–5	Dynamo Kyiv	Melitopol
17:00 EEST (UTC+3)	Shudrik (yellow card) 65'; Ponomarenko (yellow card) 72'	Report	Yarmolenko 8', 71'; Asatiani 14'; Kravets 45'; Shudrik 63' (o.g.); Ghioane (yellow card) 65'	Stadium: Spartak Stadium; Attendance: 6,800; Referee: Valeriy Davydov

29 October 2008 Round of 16	Dynamo Kyiv	2–0	Zorya Luhansk	Kyiv
19:00 EET (UTC+2)	Yarmolenko 16'; Sablić 21' (yellow card) 62'	Report	Khramtsov (yellow card) 24'; Korotetskyi (yellow card) 77' (yellow-red card) 82'	Stadium: Valeriy Lobanovskyi Dynamo Stadium; Attendance: 4,500; Referee: Anatoliy Abdula

12 November 2008 Quarterfinal	Stal Alchevsk	1–4	Dynamo Kyiv	Alchevsk
17:00 EET (UTC+2)	Sablić 56' (o.g.); Nazarenko (red card) 63'	Report	Cernat 14', 28'; Yarmolenko 36', 90+2'; Temile (yellow card) 90+2'	Stadium: Stal Alchevsk Stadium; Attendance: 7,000; Referee: Andriy Shandor

13 May 2009 Semifinal	Shakhtar Donetsk	1–0	Dynamo Kyiv	Donetsk
19:45 EEST (UTC+3)	Ilsinho (yellow card) 39'; Lewandowski 83'; Pyatov (yellow card) 90'	Report	Milevskyi (yellow card) 27'; El Kaddouri (yellow card) 51'; Aliyev (yellow card) 85'	Stadium: RSC Olimpiyskiy; Attendance: 23,000; Referee: Yuriy Mozharovskyi

=== UEFA Champions League ===
==== Qualifying rounds ====
29 July 2008 Second qualifying round 1st leg	Drogheda United (Republic of Ireland)	1–2	(Ukraine) Dynamo Kyiv	Dublin, Republic of Ireland
21:45 EEST (UTC+3)	Maher (yellow card) 27'; Hughes 47'	Report	Mykhalyk 23'; Milevskyi (yellow card) 83'; Aliyev 86'	Stadium: Dalymount Park; Attendance: 4,545; Referee: Svein Oddvar Moen (Norway)
Note: Match played at Dalymount Park, Dublin as Drogheda's United Park did not meet UEFA criteria.

6 August 2008 Second qualifying round 2nd leg	Dynamo Kyiv (Ukraine)	2–2 (4–3 agg.)	(Republic of Ireland) Drogheda United	Kyiv, Ukraine
19:00 EEST (UTC+3)	Aliyev 13'; Ghioane (yellow card) 44'; El Kaddouri (yellow card) 48'; Milevskyi 73' (pen.)	Report	Robinson (yellow card) 35' (goal) 42' (pen.); Gartland (yellow card) 47' (goal) 88'; Shelley (yellow card) 69'	Stadium: Valeriy Lobanovskyi Dynamo Stadium; Attendance: 11,400; Referee: Cüneyt Çakır (Turkey)

13 August 2008 Third qualifying round 1st leg	Spartak Moscow (Russia)	1–4	(Ukraine) Dynamo Kyiv	Moscow, Russia
19:00 EEST (UTC+3)	Bazhenov 5'; Kováč (yellow card) 69'	Report	Nesmachnyi (yellow card) 22'; Bangoura 28', 47' (yellow card) 72'; Ninković (yellow card) 31'; Milevskyi 45', 86'	Stadium: Luzhniki Stadium; Attendance: 32,600; Referee: Martin Hansson (Sweden)

27 August 2008 Third qualifying round 2nd leg	Dynamo Kyiv (Ukraine)	4–1 (8–2 agg.)	(Russia) Spartak Moscow	Kyiv, Ukraine
20:45 EEST (UTC+3)	Aliyev 4'; El Kaddouri (yellow card) 7'; Bangoura 24'; Yussuf (yellow card) 37'; Milevskyi 49', 78'	Report	Pavlenko (yellow card) 45'; Dzyuba 47'	Stadium: Valeriy Lobanovskyi Dynamo Stadium; Attendance: 15,000; Referee: Roberto Rosetti (Italy)

==== Group stage ====
Pos	Team	Pld	W	D	L	GF	GA	GD	Pts	Qualification
1	(Portugal) Porto	6	4	0	2	9	8	+1	12	Advance to knockout phase
2	(England) Arsenal	6	3	2	1	11	5	+6	11	Advance to knockout phase
3	(Ukraine) Dynamo Kyiv	6	2	2	2	4	4	0	8	Transfer to UEFA Cup
4	(Turkey) Fenerbahçe	6	0	2	4	4	11	−7	2	

Source: RSSSF

17 September 2008 1	Dynamo Kyiv (Ukraine)	1–1	(England) Arsenal	Kyiv, Ukraine
21:45 EEST (UTC+3)	Nesmachnyi (yellow card) 57'; Bangoura 64' (pen.) (yellow card) 71'; Vukojević (yellow card) 82'; Diakhaté (yellow card) 90'	Report	Sagna (yellow card) 64'; Gallas 88'	Stadium: Valeriy Lobanovskyi Dynamo Stadium; Attendance: 16,800; Referee: Luis Medina Cantalejo (Spain)

30 September 2008 2	Fenerbahçe (Turkey)	0–0	(Ukraine) Dynamo Kyiv	Istanbul, Turkey
21:45 EEST (UTC+3)	Roberto Carlos (yellow card) 40'; Kazim-Richards (yellow card) 53'; Şahin (yellow card) 62'	Report	El Kaddouri (yellow card) 35'; Aliyev (yellow card) 68'; Bohush (yellow card) 90+1'	Stadium: Şükrü Saracoğlu Stadium; Attendance: 35,112; Referee: Thomas Einwaller (Austria)

21 October 2008 3	Porto (Portugal)	0–1	(Ukraine) Dynamo Kyiv	Porto, Portugal
21:45 EEST (UTC+3)	Rolando (yellow card) 65'	Report	Aliyev 27'; Nesmachnyi (yellow card) 33'	Stadium: Estádio do Dragão; Attendance: 32,209; Referee: Terje Hauge (Norway)

5 November 2008 4	Dynamo Kyiv (Ukraine)	1–2	(Portugal) Porto	Kyiv, Ukraine
21:45 EET (UTC+2)	Milevskyi 21'; El Kaddouri (yellow card) 30'	Report	Emanuel (yellow card) 57'; Hulk (yellow card) 58'; Rolando 69'; Rodríguez (yellow card) 84'; L.González (yellow card) 87' (yellow-red card) 90+3' (goal) 90+2'	Stadium: Valeriy Lobanovskyi Dynamo Stadium; Attendance: 16,300; Referee: Konrad Plautz (Austria)

25 November 2008 5	Arsenal (England)	1–0	(Ukraine) Dynamo Kyiv	London, England
21:45 EET (UTC+2)	Van Persie (yellow card) 34'; Bendtner 87' (yellow card) 87'	Report	Milevskyi (yellow card) 17'; Asatiani (yellow card) 32'; Aliyev (yellow card) 50' (yellow-red card) 89'	Stadium: Emirates Stadium; Attendance: 59,374; Referee: Alain Hamer (Luxembourg)

10 December 2008 6	Dynamo Kyiv (Ukraine)	1–0	(Turkey) Fenerbahçe	Kyiv, Ukraine
21:45 EET (UTC+2)	Eremenko 20'; Asatiani (yellow card) 52'; Mykhalyk (yellow card) 56'; Kravets (yellow card) 79'	Report	Parlak (yellow card) 83'; Maldonado (red card) 90+4'	Stadium: Valeriy Lobanovskyi Dynamo Stadium; Attendance: 14,000; Referee: Florian Meyer (Germany)

=== UEFA Cup ===
==== Knockout stage ====
18 February 2009 Round of 32 1st leg	Dynamo Kyiv (Ukraine)	1–1	(Spain) Valencia	Kyiv, Ukraine
19:00 EET (UTC+2)	Milevskyi (yellow card) 35' (yellow-red card) 64' (goal) 63'; Betão (yellow card) 81'	Report	Silva 8'; Maduro (yellow card) 61'; Albelda (yellow card) 66'	Stadium: Valeriy Lobanovskyi Dynamo Stadium; Attendance: 16,800; Referee: Serge Gumienny (Belgium)

26 February 2009 Round of 32 2nd leg	Valencia (Spain)	2–2 (3–3 (a) agg.)	(Ukraine) Dynamo Kyiv	Valencia, Spain
22:30 EET (UTC+2)	Marchena 45'; Del Horno 54' del Horno (yellow card) 81'	Report	Kravets 34', 73'; El Kaddouri (yellow card) 43'; Nesmachnyi (yellow card) 53'; Aliyev (yellow card) 68'; Vukojević (yellow card) 70'	Stadium: Mestalla Stadium; Attendance: 30,000; Referee: Damir Skomina (Slovenia)

12 March 2009 Round of 16 1st leg	Dynamo Kyiv (Ukraine)	1–0	(Ukraine) Metalist Kharkiv	Kyiv, Ukraine
19:00 EET (UTC+2)	Vukojević 54' (yellow card) 56'	Report	Oliynyk (yellow card) 40'; Acevedo (yellow card) 43'; Edmar (yellow card) 49'; Berezovchuk (yellow card) 62'; Jajá (yellow card) 72'; Gancarczyk (yellow card) 77'	Stadium: Valeriy Lobanovskyi Dynamo Stadium; Attendance: 17,800; Referee: Mike Riley (England)

19 March 2009 Round of 16 2nd leg	Metalist Kharkiv (Ukraine)	3–2 (3–3 (a) agg.)	(Ukraine) Dynamo Kyiv	Kharkiv, Ukraine
19:00 EET (UTC+2)	Gueye (yellow card) 15'; Slyusar 29'; Jajá 56'; Acevedo 70'	Report	Mykhalyk (yellow card) 38'; Sablić 68'; Berezovchuk 79' (o.g.)	Stadium: Metalist Stadium; Attendance: 26,000; Referee: Laurent Duhamel (France)

9 April 2009 Quarterfinal 1st leg	Paris Saint-Germain (France)	0–0	(Ukraine) Dynamo Kyiv	Paris, France
21:45 EEST (UTC+3)		Report		Stadium: Parc des Princes; Attendance: 41,000; Referee: Pieter Vink (Netherlands)

16 April 2009 Quarterfinal 2nd leg	Dynamo Kyiv (Ukraine)	3–0 (3–0 agg.)	(France) Paris Saint-Germain	Kyiv, Ukraine
19:30 EEST (UTC+3)	Bangoura 4'; Landreau 16' (o.g.); Vukojević 61'	Report		Stadium: Valeriy Lobanovskyi Dynamo Stadium; Attendance: 16,300; Referee: Frank De Bleeckere (Belgium)

30 April 2009 Semifinal 1st leg	Dynamo Kyiv (Ukraine)	1–1	(Ukraine) Shakhtar Donetsk	Kyiv, Ukraine
19:30 EEST (UTC+3)	Chyhrynskyi 22' (o.g.); Vukojević (yellow card) 42'; Corrêa (yellow card) 82'	Report	Kucher (yellow card) 65'; Fernandinho 68'	Stadium: Lobanovsky Dynamo Stadium; Attendance: 17,000; Referee: Konrad Plautz (Austria)

7 May 2009 Semifinal 2nd leg	Shakhtar Donetsk (Ukraine)	2–1 (3–2 agg.)	(Ukraine) Dynamo Kyiv	Donetsk, Ukraine
19:30 EEST (UTC+3)	Jádson 17'; Hübschman (yellow card) 68'; Ilsinho 89'; Hladkyy (yellow card) 90+3'	Report	El Kaddouri (yellow card) 23'; Aliyev (yellow card) 38'; Bangoura (yellow card) 38' (goal) 47'; Vukojević (yellow card) 45+1'	Stadium: RSC Olimpiyskiy; Attendance: 24,300; Referee: Olegário Benquerença (Portugal)

== Squad statistics ==
As of match played 26 May 2009

=== Appearances and goals ===
No.	Pos	Nat	Player	Total		Premier League		Ukrainian Cup		Supercup		UEFA Champions League		UEFA Cup	
No.	Pos	Nat	Player	Apps	Goals	Apps	Goals	Apps	Goals	Apps	Goals	Apps	Goals	Apps	Goals
1	GK	(Ukraine) UKR	Oleksandr Shovkovskyi	15	0	10	0	2	0	1	0	2	0	0	0
2	DF	(Ukraine) UKR	Oleh Dopilka	3	0	1	0	2	0	0	0	0	0	0	0
3	DF	(Brazil) BRA	Betão	44	0	23+1	0	1	0	1	0	10	0	8	0
4	MF	(Romania) ROU	Tiberiu Ghioane	37	9	15+6	9	2	0	1	0	7+1	0	1+4	0
5	MF	(Croatia) CRO	Ognjen Vukojević	46	4	25+2	2	1	0	1	0	10	0	7	2
6	DF	(Croatia) CRO	Goran Sablić	18	2	6+1	0	4	1	0	0	0	0	6+1	1
7	MF	(Brazil) BRA	Carlos Corrêa	20	1	8+3	1	1	0	0	0	0	0	5+3	0
8	MF	(Ukraine) UKR	Oleksandr Aliyev	44	17	23+3	13	1	0	0+1	0	9	4	7	0
9	FW	(Ukraine) UKR	Mykola Morozyuk	10	0	0+5	0	3	0	0	0	0+2	0	0	0
10	FW	(Guinea) GUI	Ismaël Bangoura	40	19	22+4	13	1	0	0	0	9+1	4	3	2
11	MF	(Finland) FIN	Roman Eremenko	35	2	16+3	1	1+2	0	0	0	5+1	1	7	0
12	FW	(Nigeria) NGA	Frank Temile	2	0	0+1	0	0+1	0	0	0	0	0	0	0
13	FW	(Ukraine) UKR	Roland Bilala	1	0	0	0	0+1	0	0	0	0	0	0	0
15	DF	(Senegal) SEN	Pape Diakhaté	24	1	12+1	1	1	0	0	0	10	0	0	0
16	FW	(Uzbekistan) UZB	Maksim Shatskikh	11	0	4+2	0	1	0	1	0	0+3	0	0	0
17	DF	(Ukraine) UKR	Taras Mykhalyk	32	3	18	2	1	0	0	0	9	1	4	0
18	MF	(Ukraine) UKR	Serhiy Kravchenko	11	1	5+4	1	0	0	0	0	0	0	2	0
19	MF	(Romania) ROU	Florin Cernat	11	3	0+3	1	3	2	0	0	1	0	0+4	0
20	MF	(Ukraine) UKR	Oleh Husiev	13	0	4+5	0	0+1	0	0	0	0	0	0+3	0
21	GK	(Ukraine) UKR	Taras Lutsenko	2	0	0	0	1	0	0	0	1	0	0	0
22	FW	(Ukraine) UKR	Artem Kravets	23	7	6+6	4	1	1	0	0	1+5	0	4	2
23	DF	(Ukraine) UKR	Oleksandr Romanchuk	8	0	2+3	0	3	0	0	0	0	0	0	0
24	DF	(Ukraine) UKR	Andriy Sakhnevych	1	0	0	0	1	0	0	0	0	0	0	0
25	FW	(Ukraine) UKR	Artem Milevskyi	42	18	22+2	10	1+1	0	1	1	6+2	6	7	1
26	DF	(Ukraine) UKR	Andriy Nesmachnyi	36	2	17+5	2	2	0	1	0	6+1	0	3+1	0
29	DF	(Ukraine) UKR	Vitaliy Mandzyuk	6	0	6	0	0	0	0	0	0	0	0	0
30	DF	(Morocco) MAR	Badr El Kaddouri	39	1	20+3	1	1	0	0	0	7+1	0	7	0
31	GK	(Ukraine) UKR	Stanislav Bohush	36	0	20	0	1	0	0	0	7	0	8	0
32	DF	(Georgia (country)) GEO	Malkhaz Asatiani	19	1	10+1	0	3	1	0	0	1+4	0	0	0
34	DF	(Ukraine) UKR	Yevhen Khacheridi	2	0	0	0	0+2	0	0	0	0	0	0	0
36	MF	(Serbia) SRB	Miloš Ninković	37	5	17+3	5	2	0	1	0	7	0	5+2	0
37	MF	(Nigeria) NGA	Ayila Yussuf	19	0	10+1	0	1	0	0	0	2	0	4+1	0
49	FW	(Ukraine) UKR	Roman Zozulya	14	2	4+7	1	2+1	0	0	0+1	0	0	0	0
70	MF	(Ukraine) UKR	Andriy Yarmolenko	14	5	3+7	0	3	5	0+1	0	0	0	0	0
77	FW	(Brazil) BRA	Guilherme	2	3	1+1	3	0	0	0	0	0	0	0	0
Players away on loan:
Players who left Dynamo Kyiv during the season:

=== Goalscorers ===
Place	Position	Nation	Number	Name	Premier League	Ukrainian Cup	Super Cup	UEFA Champions League	UEFA Cup	Total
1	FW	(Guinea)	10	Ismaël Bangoura	13	0	0	4	2	19
2	FW	(Ukraine)	25	Artem Milevskyi	10	0	1	6	1	18
3	MF	(Ukraine)	8	Oleksandr Aliyev	13	0	0	4	0	17
4	MF	(Romania)	4	Tiberiu Ghioane	9	0	0	0	0	9
5	FW	(Ukraine)	22	Artem Kravets	4	1	0	0	2	7
6	MF	(Serbia)	36	Miloš Ninković	5	0	0	0	0	5
6	MF	(Ukraine)	70	Andriy Yarmolenko	0	5	0	0	0	5
6				Own goal	1	1	0	0	3	5
9	MF	(Croatia)	5	Ognjen Vukojević	2	0	0	0	2	4
10	MF	(Brazil)	77	Guilherme	3	0	0	0	0	3
10	MF	(Romania)	50	Florin Cernat	1	2	0	0	0	3
10	DF	(Ukraine)	17	Taras Mykhalyk	2	0	0	1	0	3
13	DF	(Ukraine)	26	Andriy Nesmachnyi	2	0	0	0	0	2
13	MF	(Finland)	11	Roman Eremenko	1	0	0	1	0	2
13	DF	(Croatia)	6	Goran Sablić	0	1	0	0	1	2
16	FW	(Ukraine)	49	Roman Zozulya	1	0	0	0	0	1
16	DF	(Morocco)	30	Badr El Kaddouri	1	0	0	0	0	1
16	DF	(Senegal)	15	Pape Diakhaté	1	0	0	0	0	1
16	MF	(Brazil)	7	Carlos Corrêa	1	0	0	0	0	1
16	MF	(Ukraine)	18	Serhiy Kravchenko	1	0	0	0	0	1
16	DF	(Georgia (country))	14	Malkhaz Asatiani	0	1	0	0	0	1
TOTALS					71	11	1	16	11	110

=== Clean sheets ===
Place	Position	Nation	Number	Name	Premier League	Ukrainian Cup	Super Cup	UEFA Champions League	UEFA Cup	Total
1	GK	(Ukraine)	31	Stanislav Bohush	13	0	0	3	3	19
2	GK	(Ukraine)	1	Oleksandr Shovkovskyi	4	2	0	0	0	6
TOTALS					17	2	0	3	3	25

=== Disciplinary record ===
Number	Nation	Position	Name	Premier League		Ukrainian Cup		Super Cup		Champions League		UEFA Cup		Total	
Number	Nation	Position	Name	Booked	Sent off (straight red)	Booked	Sent off (straight red)	Booked	Sent off (straight red)	Booked	Sent off (straight red)	Booked	Sent off (straight red)	Booked	Sent off (straight red)
3	(Brazil)	DF	Betão	1	0	0	0	0	0	0	0	1	0	1	0
4	(Romania)	MF	Tiberiu Ghioane	2	0	0	0	1	0	1	0	0	0	2	0
5	(Croatia)	MF	Ognjen Vukojević	5	0	0	0	0	0	1	0	4	0	5	0
6	(Croatia)	DF	Goran Sablić	1	0	1	0	0	0	0	0	0	0	1	0
7	(Brazil)	MF	Carlos Corrêa	0	0	0	0	0	0	0	0	1	0	1	0
8	(Ukraine)	MF	Oleksandr Aliyev	5	0	1	0	0	0	3	1	2	0	6	1
9	(Ukraine)	FW	Mykola Morozyuk	1	0	0	0	0	0	0	0	0	0	1	0
10	(Guinea)	FW	Ismaël Bangoura	4	0	0	0	0	0	2	0	1	0	3	0
11	(Finland)	MF	Roman Eremenko	3	0	0	0	0	0	0	0	0	0	1	0
12	(Nigeria)	FW	Frank Temile	0	0	1	0	0	0	0	0	0	0	1	0
14	(Georgia (country))	DF	Malkhaz Asatiani	0	0	0	0	0	0	2	0	0	0	2	0
15	(Senegal)	DF	Pape Diakhaté	2	1	0	0	1	0	1	0	0	0	2	1
17	(Ukraine)	DF	Taras Mykhalyk	5	0	0	0	0	0	1	0	1	0	2	0
18	(Ukraine)	MF	Serhiy Kravchenko	1	0	0	0	0	0	0	0	0	0	1	0
22	(Ukraine)	FW	Artem Kravets	0	0	0	0	0	0	1	0	0	0	1	0
23	(Ukraine)	DF	Oleksandr Romanchuk	1	0	0	0	0	0	0	0	0	0	1	0
25	(Ukraine)	FW	Artem Milevskyi	7	0	1	0	0	0	2	0	2	1	5	1
26	(Ukraine)	DF	Andriy Nesmachnyi	0	0	0	0	0	0	3	0	1	0	4	0
30	(Morocco)	DF	Badr El Kaddouri	6	0	1	0	0	0	4	0	2	0	7	0
31	(Ukraine)	GK	Stanislav Bohush	1	0	0	0	0	0	1	0	0	0	1	0
36	(Serbia)	MF	Miloš Ninković	1	0	0	0	0	0	1	0	0	0	1	0
37	(Nigeria)	MF	Ayila Yussuf	0	0	0	0	0	0	1	0	0	0	1	0
49	(Ukraine)	FW	Roman Zozulya	3	0	0	0	0	0	0	0	0	0	1	0
70	(Ukraine)	MF	Andriy Yarmolenko	2	0	0	0	0	0	0	0	0	0	1	0
Players away on loan:
Players who left Dynamo Kyiv during the season:
			TOTALS	51	1	5	0	2	0	24	1	15	1	97	3
