= 2008 Ukrainian Super Cup =

Fifth edition of the Ukrainian Super Cup

Dynamo Kyiv	Shakhtar Donetsk
1	1
- Shakhtar Donetsk won 5–3 on penalties
- Date: 15 July 2008
- City: Poltava
- Referee: Wolfgang Stark
- Attendance: 24,850

The 2008 Ukrainian Super Cup became the fifth edition of Ukrainian Super Cup, an annual football match contested by the winners of the previous season's Ukrainian Top League and Ukrainian Cup competitions.

The match was played at the Vorskla Stadium, Poltava, on 15 July 2008, and contested by league winner Shakhtar Donetsk and cup winner Dynamo Kyiv. Shakhtar won it 5–3 on penalties.

== Match ==
=== Details ===
15 July 2008

Dynamo Kyiv	1–1	Shakhtar Donetsk
Milevskyi 38'	Report	14' Chyhrynskyi
Penalties
Yarmolenko (penalty scored); Diakhaté (penalty missed); Ninković (penalty scored); Aliyev (penalty scored)	3–5	Fernandinho (penalty scored); Raț (penalty scored); Chyhrynskyi (penalty scored); Srna (penalty scored); Brandão (penalty scored)

Vorskla Stadium, Poltava
Attendance: 24,850
Referee: Wolfgang Stark (Germany)

Dynamo Kyiv	Shakhtar Donetsk

P	1	(Ukraine) Oleksandr Shovkovskyi (c)
D	3	(Brazil) Betão
D	15	(Senegal) Pape Diakhaté	(yellow card) 48'
D	17	(Ukraine) Taras Mykhalyk
D	26	(Ukraine) Andriy Nesmachniy
C	5	(Croatia) Ognjen Vukojević
C	37	(Nigeria) Ayila Yussuf
C	4	(Romania) Tiberiu Ghioane	(yellow card) 17'	(substituted off) 62'
C	36	(Serbia) Miloš Ninković
A	16	(Uzbekistan) Maksim Shatskikh
A	25	(Ukraine) Artem Milevskyi		(substituted off) 81'
Substitutes:
P	21	(Ukraine) Taras Lutsenko
D	2	(Ukraine) Oleh Dopilka
D	23	(Ukraine) Oleksandr Romanchuk
C	8	(Ukraine) Oleksandr Aliyev		(substituted in) 62'
C	9	(Ukraine) Mykola Morozyuk
A	22	(Ukraine) Artem Kravets
A	70	(Ukraine) Andriy Yarmolenko		(substituted in) 81'
Manager :
	(Russia) Yuri Semin

P	12	(Ukraine) Rustam Khudzhamov
D	33	(Croatia) Darijo Srna (c)	(yellow card) 86'
D	27	(Ukraine) Dmytro Chyhrynskyi
D	5	(Ukraine) Oleksandr Kucher
D	26	(Romania) Răzvan Raț
C	3	(Czech Republic) Tomáš Hübschman
C	4	(Serbia) Igor Duljaj
C	22	(Brazil) Willian		(substituted off) 46'
C	11	(Brazil) Ilsinho		(substituted off) 71'
C	7	(Brazil) Fernandinho
A	10	(Ukraine) Yevhen Seleznyov		(substituted off) 71'
Substitutes:
P	30	(Ukraine) Andriy Pyatov
D	13	(Ukraine) Vyacheslav Shevchuk
D	32	(Ukraine) Mykola Ischenko
C	8	(Brazil) Jádson		(substituted in) 71'
A	17	(Brazil) Luiz Adriano
A	21	(Ukraine) Oleksandr Hladkyy		(substituted in) 71'
A	25	(Brazil) Brandão		(substituted in) 46'
Manager :
	(Romania) Mircea Lucescu
