= 2008 Ukrainian Cup final =

Association football match

- Event: 2007–08 Ukrainian Cup
Shakhtar Donetsk	Dynamo Kyiv
2	0
- Date: 7 May 2008
- Venue: Metalist Stadium, Kharkiv
- Attendance: 38 000

The 2008 Ukrainian Cup final was a football match that took place at the Metalist Stadium on May 7, 2008. The match was the 17th Ukrainian Cup Final and it was contested by Shakhtar Donetsk and Dynamo Kyiv. The 2008 Ukrainian Cup Final was the first to be held outside of the Ukrainian capital Kyiv. Shakhtar won the match 2–0 through goals from Oleksandr Gladkiy and Oleksiy Gai.

The match had five red cards issued, two to Dynamo players and three to Shakhtar players. The match also had six yellow cards (Gladkiy received two), four of which were given to Shakhtar players and two to Dynamo players. This was in part because of players' violent behavior and also because referee Victor Shvetsov made several misjudgments.

== Road to Kharkiv ==
All 16 Ukrainian Premier League clubs do not have to go through qualification to get into the competition; Dynamo and Shakhtar therefore both qualified for the competition automatically.

Dynamo had a lot of instability en route to the final. At the beginning of the season, manager Anatoliy Demyanenko resigned after рoor results to start the season. He was replaced by former Dynamo player and coach Yozhef Sabo, who later resigned from his post afterwards due to personal health problems. In November 2007, Dynamo appointed assistant coach Oleh Luzhnyi as interim coach, who was in charge until 8 December and managed to get Dynamo through the quarter-finals. Finally, in December 2008, the club appointed former Russia national team manager Yuriy Semin.

Dynamo Kyiv

Round 1	Dynamo Kyiv	2–0	Dnipro
Round 2	Ihroservice	1–4	Dynamo Kyiv
Quarter-final (1st leg)	Tavriya Simferopol	2–0	Dynamo Kyiv
Quarter-final (2nd leg)	Dynamo Kyiv	3–0	Tavriya Simferopol
	(Dynamo won 3–2 on aggregate)		
Semi-final (1st leg)	Dynamo Kyiv	2–1	Metalurh Donetsk
Semi-final (2nd leg)	Metalurh Donetsk	0–1	Dynamo Kyiv
	(Dynamo won 3–1 on aggregate)		

Shakhtar Donetsk

Round 1	MFK Mykolaiv	0–1	Shakhtar Donetsk
Round 2	Shakhtar Donetsk	4–1	Arsenal Kyiv
Quarter-final (1st leg)	Vorskla Poltava	0–3	Shakhtar Donetsk
Quarter-final (2nd leg)	Shakhtar Donetsk	1–1	Vorskla Poltava
	(Shakhtar Donetsk won 4–1 on aggregate)		
Semi-final (1st leg)	Chornomorets	1–2	Shakhtar Donetsk
Semi-final (2nd leg)	Shakhtar Donetsk	3–0	Chornomorets
	(Shakhtar Donetsk won 5–1 on aggregate)		

== Match details ==
7 May 2008
19:00 LST

Shakhtar Donetsk	2–0	Dynamo Kyiv
Hladkyy 44'; Hai 78'	(Report)

Metalist Stadium, Kharkiv
Attendance: 28,000
Referee: Viktor Shvetsov (FIFA)

Shakhtar Donetsk	Dynamo Kyiv

Shaktar Donetsk:
GK	30	(Ukraine) Andriy Pyatov
MF	23	(Croatia) Darijo Srna (c)
DF	37	(Ukraine) Dmytro Chyhrynskyi
DF	5	(Ukraine) Oleksandr Kucher	(yellow card) 32'	(substituted off) 46'
DF	26	(Romania) Răzvan Raț	(yellow card) 56'
MF	7	(Brazil) Fernandinho
DF	11	(Brazil) Ilsinho	(substituted off) 86'
DF	3	(Czech Republic) Tomáš Hübschman
MF	4	(Serbia) Igor Duljaj	(substituted off) 75'
FW	25	(Brazil) Brandão	(red card) 64'
FW	21	(Ukraine) Oleksandr Hladkyi	44'	(yellow card) 57' (yellow-red card) 87'
Substitutes:
GK	1	(Ukraine) Bohdan Shust
MF	8	(Brazil) Jádson
FW	17	(Brazil) Luiz Adriano
MF	22	(Brazil) Willian	(substituted in) 86'
MF	19	(Ukraine) Oleksiy Hai	(substituted in) 75'	78'
DF	18	(Poland) Mariusz Lewandowski
DF	55	(Ukraine) Volodymyr Yezerskyi	(substituted in) 46'	(red card) 80'
Manager:
(Romania) Mircea Lucescu

Dynamo Kyiv:
GK	1	(Ukraine) Oleksandr Shovkovskyi (c)
DF	3	(Senegal) Pape Diakhaté	(red card) 73'
MF	4	(Romania) Tiberiu Ghioane
MF	7	(Brazil) Corrêa
MF	8	(Ukraine) Oleksandr Aliyev	(yellow card) 68'	(substituted off) 83'
FW	22	(Ukraine) Artem Kravets
DF	29	(Ukraine) Vitaliy Mandzyuk	(yellow card) 17'
DF	30	(Morocco) Badr El Kaddouri
MF	37	(Nigeria) Ayila Yussuf
FW	10	(Guinea) Ismaël Bangoura	(red card) 80'
DF	81	(Serbia) Marjan Marković	(substituted off) 46'
Substitutes:
GK	21	(Ukraine) Taras Lutsenko
FW	16	(Uzbekistan) Maksim Shatskikh
FW	25	(Ukraine) Artem Milevskyi	(substituted in) 83'
DF	26	(Ukraine) Andriy Nesmachnyi
DF	27	(Ukraine) Vladyslav Vashchuk
MF	36	(Serbia) Miloš Ninković	(substituted in) 46'
MF	17	(Ukraine) Mykola Morozyuk
Manager:
(Russia) Yuriy Semin

MATCH OFFICIALS

- Assistant referees:
  - Oleh Pluzhnyk (Kharkiv)
  - Vitaliy Ponomaryov (Lviv)
- Fourth official: Andriy Shandor (Lviv)

MATCH RULES

- 90 minutes.
- 30 minutes of extra-time if necessary.
- Penalty shoot-out if scores still level.
- Seven named substitutes
- Maximum of 3 substitutions.

Ukrainian Cup 2008 Winners

Shakhtar Donetsk
Sixth title

== Match statistics ==
	Shakhtar Donetsk	Dynamo Kyiv
Total shots	9	13
Shots on target	3	3
Ball possession	?%	?%
Corner kicks	8	9
Fouls committed	?	?
Offsides	10	1
Yellow cards	4	2
Red cards	3	2

== See also ==
- 2007–08 Ukrainian Cup
