= 2008–09 FC Metalurh Zaporizhzhia season =

Metalurh
2008-09 season
- Manager: Anatoly Chantsev (2008); Oleh Lutkov (2008-09)
- Ground: Slavutych-Arena
- League: 7th
- Cup: Round of 32
- Top goalscorer: Oleksiy Hodin (6)

== Transfers ==
=== In ===
Date	Pos.	Name	From	Fee

== Matches ==
=== Competitive ===
==== Ukrainian Premier League ====
R1	x – x

==== Ukrainian Cup ====
13 September 2008 1/16	Metalurh Zaporizhya	2 – 3	Metalurh Donetsk	Zaporizhzhia
18:00 EET	Vernydub 5'; Alozi 16'	Report	Berezovchuk 7'; Sytnik 31'; Tymchenko 90'	Stadium: Slavutych-Arena; Attendance: 8,000; Referee: Ihor Bytskalo

== Honours ==
=== Scorers ===
==== All ====
Scorer	Goals

==== League ====
Scorer	Goals

==== Cup ====
Scorer	Goals

== League squad ==
(league appearances and goals listed in brackets)

FC Metalurh Zaporizhzhia

Goalkeepers: Stanislav Bohush (1), Dmytro Bezotosnyi (2 / -3), Volodymyr Zhuk (13 / -15), Vitaliy Postranskyi (15 / -12).
Defenders: Vitaliy Vernydub (29 / 1), Volodymyr Polyovyi (28), Yan Tsiharow (26), Artsyom Chelyadzinski (15 / 1), Dmytro Nevmyvaka (29 / 4), Yevhen Opanasenko (10), Dragan Perišić (9 / 1), Nikola Vasiljević (5), Andriy Nesterov (3), Dmytro Vorobei (2).
Midfielders: Taras Stepanenko (29), Oleksiy Hodin (26 / 6), Volodymyr Arzhanov (26 / 3), Serhiy Kryvtsov (17), Serhiy Rudyka (16), Yevhen Pisotskyi (12), Mindaugas Kalonas (11 / 1), Adolphe Teikeu (10 / 1), Artem Semenenko (2), Anton Hai (1), Zadoya (1).
Forwards: Serhiy Silyuk (24 / 5), Michael Alozie (21 / 3), Taras Lazarovych (11), Artur Kaskov (4 / 2), Taras Kabanov (4), Kryvyi (3).

Managers: Anatoly Chantsev, Oleh Lutkov.

Transferred out during the season: Artsyom Chelyadzinski (Tobol), Stanislav Bohush (Dynamo Kyiv).
