= Oleksandr Romanchuk =

Oleksandr Romanchuk may refer to:

- Oleksandr Romanchuk (footballer, born 1984)
- Oleksandr Romanchuk (footballer, born 1999)
