= 2008–09 in Ukrainian football =

Football in Ukraine
- Season: 2008–09

Men's football
- Premier League: Dynamo Kyiv
- League 1: Zakarpattia Uzhhorod
- League 2: Nyva Ternopil (Group A); Zirka Kirovohrad (Group B)
- Amateur League: Yednist-2 Plysky (2009); FC Luzhany (2008)
- Cup: Vorskla Poltava
- Amateur Cup: Karpaty Yaremche (2009); Irpin Horenychi (2008)
- Super Cup: Shakhtar Donetsk

Women's football
- League High: Lehenda Chernihiv (2009); Zhytlobud-1 Kharkiv (2008)
- Women's Cup: Lehenda Chernihiv (2009); Zhytlobud-1 Kharkiv (2008)

The 2008–09 season was the 18th season of competitive association football in Ukraine since dissolution of the Soviet Union.

== Men's club football ==
League	Promoted to league	Relegated from league
Premier League	FC Illichivets Mariupol; FC Lviv	Naftovyk-Ukrnafta Okhtyrka; Zakarpattia Uzhhorod
League One	Knyazha Schaslyve; Komunalnyk Luhansk	~~MFC Mykolaiv~~; Dnipro Cherkasy; CSKA Kyiv; Stal Dniprodzerzhynsk
League Two	Bastion Illichivsk; Desna-2 Chernihiv; Dnipro-75 Dnipropetrovsk; Knyazha-2 Schaslyve; PFC Sevastopol-2; MFC Mykolaiv (readmitted)	~~Dynamo-3 Kyiv~~; ~~Enerhiya Yuzhnoukrainsk~~; ~~Naftovyk Dolyna~~; ~~Khimik Krasnoperekopsk~~; ~~Hazovyk-KhGV Kharkiv~~

Note: For all scratched clubs, see section Clubs removed for more details

=== Premier League ===
Pos	Team	Pld	W	D	L	GF	GA	GD	Pts	Qualification or relegation
1	Dynamo Kyiv (C)	30	26	1	3	71	19	+52	79	Qualification to Champions League group stage
2	Shakhtar Donetsk	30	19	7	4	47	16	+31	64	Qualification to Champions League third qualifying round
3	Metalist Kharkiv	30	17	8	5	44	25	+19	59	Qualification to Europa League third qualifying round
4	Metalurh Donetsk	30	14	7	9	36	27	+9	49	Qualification to Europa League second qualifying round
5	Vorskla Poltava	30	14	7	9	32	26	+6	49	Qualification to Europa League play-off round
6	Dnipro Dnipropetrovsk	30	13	9	8	34	25	+9	48	
7	Metalurh Zaporizhzhia	30	12	9	9	29	30	−1	45	
8	Tavriya Simferopol	30	10	7	13	41	45	−4	37	
9	Karpaty Lviv	30	8	10	12	33	39	−6	34	
10	Chornomorets Odesa	30	12	2	16	34	42	−8	32 (Note: Chornomorets were docked 6 points for failing to satisfy contractual obligations with the Bosnian player Đorđe Inđić.)	
11	Arsenal Kyiv	30	8	8	14	26	33	−7	32	
12	Kryvbas Kryvyi Rih	30	8	8	14	21	36	−15	32	
13	Zorya Luhansk	30	8	7	15	29	45	−16	31	
14	Illichivets Mariupol	30	7	5	18	31	54	−23	26	
15	FC Lviv (R)	30	6	8	16	24	39	−15	26	Relegation to Ukrainian First League
16	FC Kharkiv (R)	30	2	9	19	19	50	−31	12 (Note: On 6 May 2009 FC Kharkiv were docked 3 points by the Disciplinary Committee of the FPL (application fees).)	Relegation to Ukrainian First League

Source: uafootball.net.ua
Rules for classification: 1st points; 2nd overall wins; 3rd goal difference; 4th goals scored
(C) Champions; (R) Relegated

=== League 1 ===
Pos	Team	Pld	W	D	L	GF	GA	GD	Pts	Promotion or relegation
1	Zakarpattia Uzhhorod (C, P)	32	21	6	5	55	28	+27	69	Promoted to Ukrainian Premier League
2	Obolon Kyiv (P)	32	19	6	7	74	40	+34	63	Promoted to Ukrainian Premier League
3	PFC Oleksandria	32	15	9	8	43	31	+12	54	
4	PFC Sevastopol	32	15	6	11	43	41	+2	51	
5	Volyn Lutsk	32	15	5	12	48	46	+2	50	
6	Krymteplytsia Molodizhne	32	14	7	11	40	39	+1	49	
7	Desna Chernihiv	32	13	8	11	31	33	−2	47	
8	Dynamo-2 Kyiv	32	11	14	7	43	42	+1	47	
9	Dniester Ovidiopol	32	11	10	11	39	40	−1	43	
10	Stal Alchevsk	32	11	10	11	33	39	−6	43	Fair Play Award
11	Ihroservice Simferopol (D)	32	12	6	14	42	47	−5	42	Withdrew (expelled) from PFL (Note: After the season completed, Ihroservice Simferopol withdrew due to licensing issues for the next season)
12	Naftovyk-Ukrnafta Okhtyrka (Note: Naftovyk-Ukrnafta Okhtyrka deducted 3 points by the Ukrainian Football Federation (January 22, 2009))	32	11	11	10	41	42	−1	41	
13	Feniks-Illichovets Kalinine	32	9	11	12	33	38	−5	38	
14	Enerhetyk Burshtyn	32	8	7	17	29	43	−14	31	
15	Helios Kharkiv	32	8	6	18	28	44	−16	30	
16	Prykarpattya Ivano-Frankivsk	32	7	7	18	26	54	−28	28	Avoided relegation (Note: Due to the licensing issues of Ihroservice Simferopol, Prykarpattya Ivano-Frankivsk who finished in 16th place were not relegated by the PFL.)
17	Knyazha Schaslyve (D)	32	5	5	22	22	23	−1	20	Withdrew (expelled) from PFL (Note: Knyazha Schaslyve withdrew after the winter break; Komunalnyk Luhansk was withdrawn from the league and its results were annulled)
–	Komunalnyk Luhansk (D)	0	2	1	10	12	31	—	0	Withdrew (expelled) from PFL

(C) Champions; (D) Disqualified; (P) Promoted

=== League 2 ===
Pos	Team	Pld	W	D	L	GF	GA	GD	Pts	Promotion or relegation
1	FC Nyva Ternopil (C, P)	32	21	8	3	50	26	+24	71	Promoted to First League
2	FC Arsenal Bila Tserkva (P)	32	21	4	7	51	31	+20	67	Playoff game winner Promoted to First League
3	PFC Nyva Vinnytsia	32	18	7	7	42	30	+12	61	Name change (Note: Nyva Vinnytsia renamed themselves from Nyva-Svitanok prior to the start of the season)
4	FC CSCA Kyiv	32	18	3	11	40	23	+17	57	
5	FC Nafkom Brovary	32	16	4	12	45	33	+12	52	Withdrew
6	FC Bastion Illichivsk	32	16	4	12	36	40	−4	52	
7	FC Dnipro Cherkasy	32	17	5	10	37	20	+17	50 (Note: FC Dnipro Cherkasy deducted 6 points by the Ukrainian Football Federation. Three points on November 2, 2008 and three points on March 26, 2009. The club failed to arrive for their 29th and 30th Round games and subsequently were expelled from the competition by the PFL.)	Expelled
8	FC Dynamo Khmelnytskyi	32	14	5	13	32	38	−6	47	Name change (Note: FC Podillya-Khmelnytskyi renamed themselves to Dynamo Khmelnytskyi on March 2, 2009.)
9	FC Bukovyna Chernivtsi	32	14	2	16	29	39	−10	44	
10	FC Ros Bila Tserkva	32	12	8	12	38	38	0	44	
11	MFK Mykolaiv	32	11	10	11	28	27	+1	43	(Note: MFK Mykolaiv were readmitted into the PFL after dissolving at the end of the Persha Liha 2007–08 season at the expense of FC Dynamo-3 Kyiv who withdrew from the competition)
12	FC Yednist' Plysky	32	12	4	16	31	41	−10	40	
13	FC Veres Rivne	32	11	6	15	24	32	−8	39	
14	FC Karpaty-2 Lviv	32	9	7	16	28	45	−17	34	
15	FC Korosten	32	8	2	22	24	42	−18	23 (Note: FC Korosten deducted 3 points by the Ukrainian Football Federation on March 26, 2009. After not arriving for their 22nd-round game against Veres Rivne, the PFL expelled FC Korosten from the professional leagues.)	Expelled
16	FC Obolon-2 Kyiv	32	5	4	23	20	30	−10	19	Withdrew
17	FC Knjazha-2 Schaslyve	32	4	2	26	15	35	−20	14	Withdrew

(C) Champions; (P) Promoted
Notes:

Pos	Team	Pld	W	D	L	GF	GA	GD	Pts	Promotion or relegation
1	Zirka Kirovohrad (C, P)	34	23	3	8	58	26	+32	72	Promoted to First League – Name Change (Note: Prior to the start of the season FC Olimpik Kirovohrad changed back its name to Zirka, and Zirka that participated in amateur competitions became Olimpik.)
2	FC Poltava	34	21	9	4	52	23	+29	72	Playoff game
3	Stal Dniprodzerzhynsk	34	21	7	6	62	29	+33	70	
4	Tytan Armyansk	34	19	7	8	55	31	+24	64	
5	Shakhtar-3 Donetsk	34	17	7	10	66	44	+22	58	
6	Olimpik Donetsk	34	16	9	9	55	32	+23	57	
7	Olkom Melitopol	34	14	8	12	40	43	−3	50	
8	Shakhtar Sverdlovsk	34	12	13	9	31	22	+9	46 (Note: FC Tytan Donetsk, FC Shakhtar Sverdlovsk, and FC Hirnyk Kryvyi Rih deducted three points on June 18, 2009.)	
9	Tytan Donetsk	34	12	11	11	37	33	+4	44	Withdrew
10	Illichivets-2 Mariupol	34	12	8	14	40	50	−10	44	
11	Hirnyk Kryvyi Rih	34	15	5	14	46	56	−10	41 (Note: FC Arsenal Kharkiv, FC Hirnyk Kryvyi Rih, FC Dnipro-75 Dnipropetrovsk, and FC Sumy were deducted three points for non-paying the participation fees; FC Hirnyk Kryvyi Rih, FC Dnipro-75 Dnipropetrovsk, and FC Sumy were deducted additional three points for non-paying the participation fees for the second half of the season. The decision was officially declared by the Disciplinary Committee of PFL on May 28, 2009)	
12	Arsenal Kharkiv	34	11	10	13	36	47	−11	40	Withdrew
13	Hirnyk-Sport Komsomolsk	34	9	8	17	28	45	−17	35	
14	Kremin Kremenchuk	34	10	7	17	43	52	−9	34 (Note: FC Kremin Kremenchuk deducted 3 points by the Ukrainian Football Federation March 26, 2008)	
15	Metalurh-2 Zaporizhzhia	34	9	4	21	35	68	−33	31	
16	Dnipro-75 Dnipropetrovsk	34	8	6	20	28	56	−28	24	
17	FC Sumy	34	6	10	18	27	60	−33	22	Name change (Note: FC Yavir Krasnopillya changed their name to FC Sumy on September 11, 2008)
18	PFC Sevastopol-2	34	2	4	28	17	39	−22	10	Withdrew

(C) Champions; (P) Promoted

=== Playoff game ===
Due to FC Ihroservice Simferopol failing to pay their license dues for the 2009–10 Ukrainian First League season the PFL allowed an extra team to be promoted. The PFL determined that a playoff game between the 2nd placed teams Druha Liha – Arsenal Bila Tserkva and FC Poltava.

Playoff game to determine promotion

July 12, 2009
17:00 UTC+3

Arsenal Bila Tserkva	1 – 0	FC Poltava
Derevliov 60'	Report

Central Stadium, Cherkasy
Attendance: 300
Referee: Vitaliy Hodulian (Odesa)

=== Cup competitions ===
==== Ukrainian Cup ====
31 May 2009
17:00 LST

Vorskla Poltava	1–0	Shakhtar Donetsk
Sachko 50'	Report

Dnipro Stadium, Dnipropetrovsk
Attendance: 25,700
Referee: Vitaliy Hodulyan (Odesa)

==== Super Cup ====
15 July 2008

Dynamo Kyiv	1–1	Shakhtar Donetsk
Milevskyi 38'	Report	14' Chyhrynskyi
Penalties
Yarmolenko (penalty scored); Diakhaté (penalty missed); Ninković (penalty scored); Aliyev (penalty scored)	3–5	Fernandinho (penalty scored); Raț (penalty scored); Chyhrynskyi (penalty scored); Srna (penalty scored); Brandão (penalty scored)

Vorskla Stadium, Poltava
Attendance: 24,850
Referee: Wolfgang Stark (Germany)

== Women's club football ==
League	Promoted to league	Relegated from league
Higher League	Voskhod Stara Maiachka	~~Lehenda-ShVSM Chernihiv~~; Ateks SDIuShOR-16 Kyiv

Note: For all scratched clubs, see section Clubs removed for more details

=== Higher League ===
2009 Vyshcha Liha (women)
