= Vitaliy Komarnytskyi =

Ukrainian footballer (born 1981)

Vitaliy Komarnytskyi Віталій Комарницький

Personal information
- Full name: Vitaliy Stanislavovych Komarnytskyi
- Date of birth: 2 August 1981 (age 45)
- Place of birth: Vinnytsia, Soviet Union
- Position: Defender

Senior career*
Years	Team	Apps	(Gls)
1997	FC Fortuna Sharhorod	4	(0)
1998	Nyva Vinnytsia	16	(1)
1998–1999	Hapoel Petah Tikva	2	(0)
1999–2000	Maccabi Acre	?	(2)
2000–2003	Ironi Rishon LeZion	74	(1)
2003	Dnipro Dnipropetrovsk	5	(0)
2003	→ Dnipro-2 Dnipropetrovsk	1	(1)
2004	Metalist Kharkiv	30	(0)
2005	Arsenal Kharkiv	16	(1)
2005–2009	FC Kharkiv	103	(0)
2009	Kryvbas Kryvyi Rih	11	(0)
2010–2012	Zakarpattia Uzhhorod	59	(2)
2012–2017	Helios Kharkiv	74+?	(0)

International career
1999–2001	Ukraine U19	23	(1)
2002–2003	Ukraine U21	9	(0)

Managerial career
- 2017–2018: Helios Kharkiv U19
- 2018: Helios Kharkiv (caretaker)
Medal record
Men's football
Representing Ukraine
UEFA European Under-18 Championship
Runner-up	2000 Germany
- * Club domestic league appearances and goals

Vitaliy Komarnytskyi (Ukrainian: Віталій Станіславович Комарницький; born 2 August 1981) is a Ukrainian retired professional footballer who played as a defender.

== Career ==
Komarnytskyi participated in the 2001 FIFA World Youth Championship. Raised in Ukraine, he spent his formulative football years in Israel.

== See also ==
- 2001 FIFA World Youth Championship squads#Ukraine
