= Taras Mykhalyk =

Ukrainian footballer

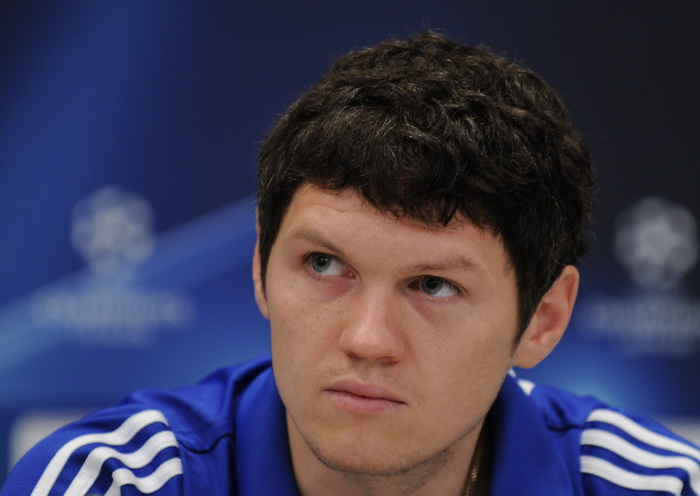
- Mykhalyk with Dynamo Kyiv in 2010

Personal information
- Full name: Taras Volodymyrovych Mykhalyk
- Date of birth: 28 October 1983 (age 43)
- Place of birth: Lyubeshiv, Ukrainian SSR (now Ukraine)
- Height: 1.85 m (6 ft 1 in)
- Positions: Defensive midfielder; centre-back

Team information
- Current team: Volyn Lutsk (youth coach)

Youth career
- Prypyat Lyubeshiv
- Volyn National University

Senior career*
Years	Team	Apps	(Gls)
2001–2005	CSKA Kyiv	89	(10)
2005–2013	Dynamo Kyiv	124	(8)
2005	→ Zakarpattia Uzhhorod (loan)	18	(3)
2013–2019	Lokomotiv Moscow	83	(2)
2019–2020	Volyn Lutsk	21	(0)
2020–2021	Votrans Lutsk (amateurs)	8	(0)

International career^{‡}
2006	Ukraine U21	10	(0)
2006–2012	Ukraine	32	(0)

Managerial career
- 2021–2022: Volyn Lutsk (assistant)
- 2022: Volyn Lutsk (youth coach)
Medal record
Men's football
Representing Ukraine
UEFA European Under-21 Championship
Runner-up	2006
- * Club domestic league appearances and goals as of 22 October 2021 ‡ National team caps and goals as of 22 July 2019

Taras Volodymyrovych Mykhalyk (Ukrainian: Тарас Володимирович Михалик; born 28 October 1983) is a retired Ukrainian footballer who played as a centre-back. He is a versatile player, having professionally played at every position except goalkeeper.

== Club career ==
Mykhalyk is a product of the football youth system of his native Volyn region, where he was a striker.

After graduating from the Vocational technical school in his region, Mykhalyk enrolled in the Institute of Physical Education at the Volyn National University, and played in the team there that participated in the championship of the Volyn Oblast.

The 18-year-old Mykhalyk joined the Ukrainian First League club CSKA Kyiv in 2001. He established himself into the starting line-up of the squad, playing 89 matches in the four seasons that he was there. He also managed to net 10 goals.

=== Dynamo Kyiv ===
Ukrainian giants Dynamo Kyiv bought Mykhalyk in the 2005–06 season, originally signing a five-year contract. He was almost immediately loaned off to Zakarpattia Uzhhorod. Mykhalyk has stated in an interview that he was really surprised to get a call from Dynamo Kyiv president Ihor Surkis inviting him to come and try out for the team, as he never even had any attention from scouts of his local Volyn Lutsk of the Ukrainian First League. Even more shocking was a call-up to the main Ukraine national football team by coach Oleh Blokhin not long afterward.

Mykhalyk came back to Dynamo in January 2006. The head coach at the time, Anatoliy Demyanenko recognized the player's great potential, but Mykhalyk constantly struggled to break through to the starting line-up of the team. When he did play, he was used as a central midfielder.

On 10 July 2007, Mykhalyk saved Dynamo, scoring two goals in the 2007 Ukrainian Super Cup, which ended up being a 2:2 draw. After the penalty shootout, Dynamo won 4:2.

When Russian coach Yuri Semin took over Dynamo in December 2007, he began to make sweeping reforms. These included reforming the defence and not depending so much on long passes. During this process, Semin had Mykhalyk eventually switch entirely to defence. By the time of the 2008 Channel One Cup in Israel, which Dynamo won, Mykhalyk played the entire competition as a central defender.

During the winter transfer season of 2008–09, Mykhalyk was linked with the Serie A team A.C. Milan and even nicknamed the "Ukrainian Gattuso" due to his impressive performances in Dynamo Kyiv and internationally.

Mykhalyk renewed his contract with Dynamo Kyiv, which was due to expire at the end of 2010, in November 2008. His new contract is to last five years, ending in 2013. After three years in Dynamo, the player has earned the team's trust enough to have even been the captain on several occasions.

On 6 April 2009 Mykhalyk suffered a meniscus injury after a challenge from Metalurh Donetsk midfielder Velizar Dimitrov in the Ukrainian Premier League, which ended the player's season early. Не recovered from this injury in October 2009.

=== Lokomotiv Moscow ===
In the summer of 2013 Mykhalyk, being a free agent, signed 3-year deal with Russian side Lokomotiv Moscow. Under Lokomotiv manager Leonid Kuchuk Mykhalyk usually played at defensive midfield position. His maiden goal in RFPL scored on 5 October 2013, when he levelled the score to get his team a 2–2 draw, coincided with his first red card in Russia.

He left Lokomotiv at the end of the 2018–19 season. He didn't appear in any league games in that season, but played 3 games in the 2018–19 Russian Cup which Lokomotiv won.

== International career ==
Mykhalyk was a member of the Ukrainian Under-21 National football team that finished as runners-up in the UEFA U-21 Championship 2006. He was in the main squad in Oleksiy Mykhailychenko's squad even up to the final, which Ukraine lost to the Netherlands 3–0.

Mykhalyk received his first call-up for the senior national team by head coach Oleh Blokhin for a match against Azerbaijan on 15 August 2006. Ukraine went on to win 6–0 and Mykhalyk played 30 minutes of the game. He went on to play five more games under Blokhin's leadership, two more friendly matches and three UEFA Euro 2008 Qualifying games.

Mykhalyk was reunited with his former under-21 manager in 2008 when Oleksiy Mykhailychenko took the helm of the national team in its attempt to qualify for the 2010 World Cup after Blokhin's failure to qualify for the Euro. Mykhalyk established himself as one of the main players this time, playing center-back usually alongside Shakhtar Donetsk's Dmytro Chyhrynskyi. He went on to play 7 out of the 10 qualifying games as well as 3 friendlies. Ukraine finished second in its qualifying group and was drawn to play against Greece in the play-offs. However Mykhalyk did not take part in these games because of injury, neither did Chygrynskiy who had recently transferred to FC Barcelona and did not get enough game practice there. Ukraine went on to lose the play-off round due mostly to its weak defence and the Ukrainian Football Federation did not renew Mykhailychenko's contract.

=== Career statistics ===
As of 27 May 2019

Club	Season	League			Cup		Continental		Other		Total	
Club	Season	Division	Apps	Goals	Apps	Goals	Apps	Goals	Apps	Goals	Apps	Goals
FC CSKA Kyiv	2001–02	Ukrainian First League	7	0	0	0	–		–		7	0
FC CSKA Kyiv	2002–03	Ukrainian First League	28	1	1	0	–		–		29	1
FC CSKA Kyiv	2003–04	Ukrainian First League	30	4	1	1	–		–		31	5
FC CSKA Kyiv	2004–05	Ukrainian First League	26	5	3	2	–		–		29	7
FC CSKA Kyiv	Total		91	10	5	3	0	0	0	0	96	13
FC Zakarpattia Uzhhorod	2005–06	Ukrainian Premier League	18	3	0	0	–		–		18	3
FC Dynamo Kyiv	2005–06	Ukrainian Premier League	5	0	1	0	–		–		6	0
FC Dynamo Kyiv	2006–07	Ukrainian Premier League	23	2	6	1	6	0	1 (Note: One appearance in the Ukrainian Super Cup)	0	36	3
FC Dynamo Kyiv	2007–08	Ukrainian Premier League	16	1	3	0	3	0	1 (Note: One appearance, two goals in the Ukrainian Super Cup)	2	23	3
FC Dynamo Kyiv	2008–09	Ukrainian Premier League	18	2	0	0	13	1	1 (Note: One appearance in the Ukrainian Super Cup)	0	32	3
FC Dynamo Kyiv	2009–10	Ukrainian Premier League	21	1	1	0	4	1	0	0	26	2
FC Dynamo Kyiv	2010–11	Ukrainian Premier League	18	1	2	0	10	0	–		30	1
FC Dynamo Kyiv	2011–12	Ukrainian Premier League	7	0	1	0	1	0	–		9	0
FC Dynamo Kyiv	2012–13	Ukrainian Premier League	17	1	0	0	10	1	–		27	2
FC Dynamo Kyiv	Total		125	8	14	1	47	3	3	2	189	14
FC Lokomotiv Moscow	2013–14	Russian Premier League	12	1	1	0	–		–		13	1
FC Lokomotiv Moscow	2014–15	Russian Premier League	16	0	3	0	1	0	–		20	0
FC Lokomotiv Moscow	2015–16	Russian Premier League	21	0	1	0	6	0	1 (Note: One appearance in the Russian Super Cup)	0	29	0
FC Lokomotiv Moscow	2016–17	Russian Premier League	24	1	4	0	–		–		28	1
FC Lokomotiv Moscow	2017–18	Russian Premier League	10	0	1	1	2	0	–		13	1
FC Lokomotiv Moscow	2018–19	Russian Premier League	0	0	3	0	–		–		3	0
FC Lokomotiv Moscow	Total		83	2	13	1	9	0	1	0	106	3
Career total			317	23	32	5	56	3	4	2	409	33

== Personal life ==
Taras Mykhalyk is not single, which he confirmed in a recent interview, stating that he spends much of spare time with his girlfriend. He also stated that on the winter breaks his favorite pastime is hunting, while in the summer he prefers to go fishing.

Mykhalyk's father works in a school as a teacher of physical education, while his mother works in the regional state administration. He is from a large family: he has one older brother and five younger sisters. He stated that he is financially aiding his parents, and helping to pay for the education of one of his sisters at the Kyiv Theological Seminary and another at the National Aviation University.

== Honours ==
=== Club ===
Dynamo Kyiv

- Ukrainian Premier League: 2006–07, 2008–09
- Ukrainian Cup: 2005–06, 2006–07
- Ukrainian Super Cup: 2006, 2007

Lokomotiv Moscow

- Russian Premier League: 2017–18
- Russian Cup: 2014–15, 2016–17, 2018–19

Ukraine under-21

- UEFA Under-21 Championship: runner-up 2006
