= Oleksiy Khramtsov =

Ukrainian footballer

Personal information
- Full name: Oleksiy Volodymyrovych Khramtsov
- Date of birth: 8 November 1975 (age 50)
- Place of birth: Simferopol, Ukrainian SSR
- Height: 1.80 m (5 ft 11 in)
- Position: Defender

Team information
- Current team: Navbahor Namangan

Senior career*
| Years | Team | Apps | (Gls) |
| 1997–1998 | Mykolaiv | 29 | (0) |
| 1998 | Kryvbas-2 Kryvyi Rih | 11 | (0) |
| 1999 | Spartak Ivano-Frankivsk | 23 | (0) |
| 2002–2005 | Tavriya Simferopol | 67 | (0) |
| 2005 | Stal Alchevsk | 16 | (1) |
| 2006–2009 | Zorya Luhansk | 56 | (2) |
| 2010– | Navbahor Namangan | 1 | (0) |
- * Club domestic league appearances and goals as of 18 March 2010

Oleksiy Volodymyrovych Khramtsov (Ukrainian: Олексій Володимирович Храмцов; born 8 November 1975) is a Ukrainian professional football defender who played for different clubs in the Ukrainian Premier League.
