= Badr El Kaddouri =

Moroccan footballer (born 1981)

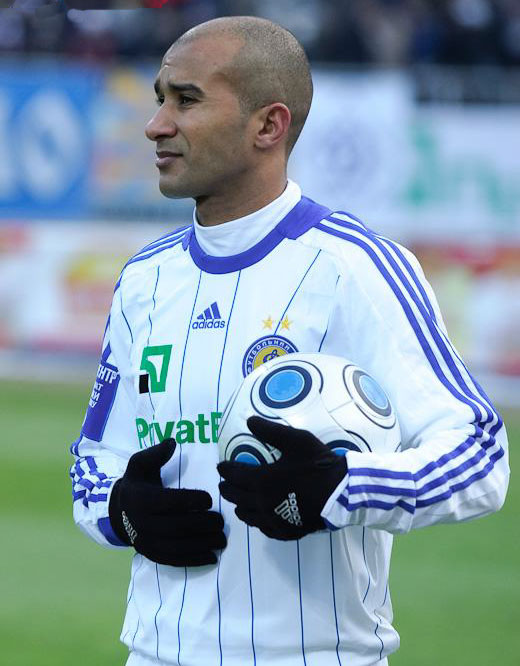
- El Kaddouri playing for Dynamo Kyiv.

Personal information
- Full name: Badr El Kaddouri
- Date of birth: 31 January 1981 (age 45)
- Place of birth: Casablanca, Morocco
- Height: 1.77 m (5 ft 9 1/2 in)
- Position: Left back

Youth career
- ?–2000: Wydad Casablanca

Senior career*
Years	Team	Apps	(Gls)
2000–2002	Wydad Casablanca	38	(0)
2002–2013	Dynamo Kyiv	269	(14)
2002–2003	→ Dynamo-2 Kyiv	19	(0)
2011–2012	→ Celtic (loan)	6	(1)
2012	→ Dynamo-2 Kyiv	9	(0)

International career^{‡}
2004	Morocco U23		
2002–2012	Morocco	46	(0)
- * Club domestic league appearances and goals as of 31 January 2013 ‡ National team caps and goals as of 31 January 2012

Badr El Kaddouri (born 31 January 1981) is a retired Moroccan footballer, who last played for Ukrainian Premier League side Dynamo Kyiv. He was also a Moroccan international. El Kaddouri was a left back but could also play left midfield if needed.

== Career ==
=== Wydad Casablanca ===
El Kaddouri started his career at Wydad Casablanca in 2000. In 2001, he helped the club win the Moroccan Cup. The following season, he joined Dynamo Kyiv.

=== Dynamo Kyiv ===
El Kaddouri joined Dynamo Kyiv in 2002 and, up until his loan move to Celtic in 2011, was one of the club's longest serving players. He made his debut with Dynamo on 17 August 2002 in a 3–1 victory over Volyn Lutsk. While at the club, he won four Ukrainian Premier League titles, four Ukrainian Cup's and five Ukrainian Super Cups. He appeared in 123 league matches while occasionally captaining the team.

=== Celtic ===
On 31 August 2011, El Kaddouri signed for Scottish Premier League club Celtic on a six-month loan deal with an option to buy. He was the first ever Moroccan to play for Celtic. He was brought in as cover for Emilio Izaguirre, who had received a long-term injury. On 10 September 2011, El Kaddouri made his Celtic debut in a 4–0 over Motherwell. He scored his first goal for Celtic in the Old Firm derby match against Rangers on 18 September 2011 and made 6 appearances for the Scottish side before returning to Dynamo Kyiv in January 2012.

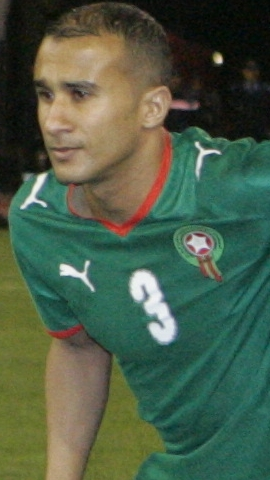
Badr El Kaddouri playing for Morocco

== International career ==
El Kaddouri had a total of 45 appearances for his country and was a regular in the national side. He also competed at the 2004 Summer Olympics with the Moroccan Olympic team.

== Honours ==
=== Club ===
Wydad Casablanca

- Coupe du Trône: 2001
- African Cup Winners' Cup: 2002

Dynamo Kyiv

- Ukrainian Premier League (4): 2003, 2004, 2007, 2009
- Ukrainian Cup (4): 2003, 2005, 2006, 2007
- Ukrainian Super Cup (5): 2004, 2006, 2007, 2009, 2011

Celtic

- Scottish Premier League: 2012
