= Manuel Schmid (footballer) =

Austrian footballer

Personal information
- Full name: Manuel Schmid
- Date of birth: August 23, 1981 (age 45)
- Place of birth: Kitzbühel, Austria
- Height: 1.82 m (5 ft 11 1/2 in)
- Position: Midfielder

Senior career*
Years	Team	Apps	(Gls)
2003–2005	Kapfenberg	38	(5)
2005–2008	Altach	78	(8)
2008–2009	Wacker Innsbruck	29	(3)
2009–2011	Kapfenberg	36	(2)
- * Club domestic league appearances and goals as of May 9, 2010

Manuel Schmid (born August 23, 1981) is an Austrian professional association football player who played in the Bundesliga for Altach and Kapfenberg. He can play as a right midfielder but also right back.
