= Volodymyr Zhuk =

Ukrainian footballer

Personal information
- Date of birth: 30 May 1986 (age 40)
- Place of birth: Zaporizhzhia, Ukrainian SSR
- Height: 1.91 m (6 ft 3 in)
- Position: Defender

Youth career
- 1999: Torpedo Zaporizhzhia
- 2000–2002: Metalurh Zaporizhzhia

Senior career*
Years	Team	Apps	(Gls)
2002–2011	Metalurh Zaporizhzhia	15	(0)
2002–2011	→ Metalurh-2 Zaporizhzhia	28	(0)
2012	Krymteplytsia Molodizhne	6	(0)
2012	Metalurh Zaporizhzhia	0	(0)
2013	Olimpik Donetsk	3	(0)
2015–2019	Tavria-Skif Rozdol		
- * Club domestic league appearances and goals

Volodymyr Zhuk (Ukrainian: Володимир Жук; born 30 May 1986) is a Ukrainian former football goalkeeper.

== Career ==
Born in Zaporizhzhia, Zhuk played youth football for FC Torpedo Zaporizhzhia and FC Metalurh Zaporizhzhia. He made his Premier League debut with Metalurh Zaporizhzhia against FC Vorskla Poltava on 19 October 2008. He would make a total of 15 Premier League appearances for Metalurh Zaporizhzhia before signing with Ukrainian First League side FC Olimpik Donetsk in 2013.
