= Betão (footballer, born November 1983) =

Brazilian footballer (born 1983)

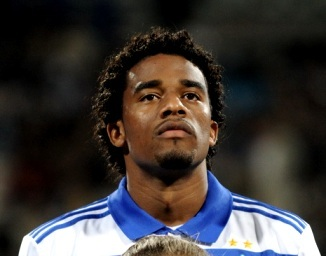
- Betão with Dynamo Kyiv in 2011

Personal information
- Full name: Ebert Willian Amâncio
- Date of birth: 11 November 1983 (age 43)
- Place of birth: São Paulo, Brazil
- Height: 1.80 m (5 ft 11 in)
- Position: Central defender

Youth career
- 2000: Corinthians

Senior career*
Years	Team	Apps	(Gls)
2001–2007	Corinthians	143	(4)
2008	Santos	5	(0)
2008–2013	Dynamo Kyiv	106	(0)
2013	→ Evian (loan)	16	(1)
2013	Ponte Preta	7	(0)
2015	Dynamo Kyiv	0	(0)
2015–2016	Evian	34	(0)
2016–2022	Avaí	116	(1)
- * Club domestic league appearances and goals

Ebert Willian Amâncio or simply Betão (born 11 November 1983), is a Brazilian former professional footballer.

He played as a central defender and can also play on the right side of the back four. Betão is known for his positioning, aerial ability, strength and coverage of the opposing players.

== Career ==
Betão began his career in Corinthians before signing a four-year contract with Sochaux for €1 million on 6 August 2007.

On 14 August 2007, Sochaux decided to sell him, which led to Betão returning to Corinthians.

Betão's contract with Corinthians expired on 31 December 2007. He was offered a three-year renewal but declined. On 8 January 2008, Betão trained with Santos and signed a three-year contract the following day.

Betão made his debut for Santos on 16 January 2008 in the Campeonato Paulista, where they lost 0–2 against Portuguesa. He scored his first goal on 24 February 2008 in the 4–1 victory over Ituano for the Campeonato Paulista 2008.

On 14 January 2015, Betão announced his return to Dynamo Kyiv signing a contract until the end of the season. After only making appearances in the Ukrainian Super Cup, he ended up winning the cup and the Ukrainian Premier League that season. In June 2015, the president of Dynamo Ihor Surkis has confirmed that the club has not renewed Betao's contract and have ended their cooperation with him. On 3 July 2015, he signed a three-year contract with Evian.

On 15 August 2016, Betão returned to Brazil and joined second tier club Avaí. Following the side's promotion to Série A, his contract was extended for a year on 7 December 2018.

== Career statistics ==
As of 26 June 2017

Club	Season	League			National Cup		Continental		Other		Total	
Club	Season	Division	Apps	Goals	Apps	Goals	Apps	Goals	Apps	Goals	Apps	Goals
Corinthians	2003	Brasileirão	8	0	0	0	0	0	—		8	0
Corinthians	2004	Brasileirão	37	0	0	0	0	0	—		37	0
Corinthians	2005	Brasileirão	37	1	2	0	4	0	6	0	52	0
Corinthians	2006	Brasileirão	29	0	0	0	12	0	1	0	42	0
Corinthians	2007	Brasileirão	29	3	2	0	27	0	8	0	30	0
Santos	2008	Brasileirão	5	0	0	0	10	0	1	0	16	0
Total			145	3	4	0	—	—	18	0	175	0
Dynamo Kyiv	2008–09	Ukrainian Premier League	24	0	0	0	18	0	—		42	0
Dynamo Kyiv	2009–10	Ukrainian Premier League	20	0	0	0	5	0	—		25	0
Dynamo Kyiv	2010–11	Ukrainian Premier League	24	0	3	0	9	0	—		36	0
Dynamo Kyiv	2011–12	Ukrainian Premier League	25	0	1	0	8	0	—		34	0
Dynamo Kyiv	2012–13	Ukrainian Premier League	13	0	1	0	8	0	—		22	0
Dynamo Kyiv	2014–15	Ukrainian Premier League	0	0	3	0	0	0	—		3	0
Total			106	0	8	0	48	0	—	—	162	0
Evian (loan)	2012–13	Ligue 1	16	1	5	0	0	0	—		21	1
Total			16	1	5	0	0	0	0	0	21	1
→ Ponte Preta (loan)	2013	Série A	7	0	0	0	3	0	—		10	0
Total			7	0	0	0	3	0	0	0	10	0
Evian	2015–16	Ligue 2	34	0	2	0	0	0	—		36	0
Total			34	0	2	0	0	0	0	0	36	0
Avaí	2016	Série A	17	0	0	0	0	0	—		17	0
Avaí	2017	Série A	9	0	4	0	—		18	0	31	0
Total			26	0	4	0	—	—	18	0	48	0
Career total			189	1	19	0	51	0	18	0	277	1

== Honours ==
Corithians

- Torneio Rio – São Paulo: 2002
- Copa do Brasil: 2002
- Campeonato Paulista: 2003
- Campeonato Brasileiro Série A: 2005

Dynamo Kyiv

- Ukrainian Premier League: 2008–09, 2014-15
- Ukrainian Cup: 2014–15
- Ukrainian Super Cup: 2009–10

Avaí

- Campeonato Catarinense: 2019, 2021
