= Andriy Nesmachnyi =

Ukrainian footballer

Andrey Nesmachniy
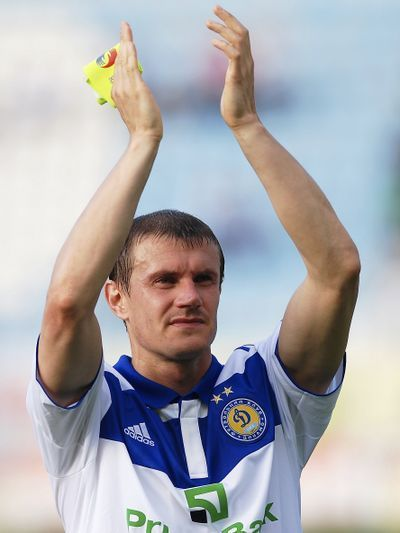

Personal information
- Full name: Andrey Mykolayovych Nesmachniy
- Date of birth: 28 February 1979 (age 47)
- Place of birth: Bryansk, Soviet Union (now Russia)
- Height: 1.82 m (6 ft 0 in)
- Position: Left-back

Youth career
- DYuSSh Bakhchisarai
- UOR Simferopol

Senior career*
Years	Team	Apps	(Gls)
1997–1999	Dynamo-3 Kyiv	31	(3)
1997–2004	Dynamo-2 Kyiv	48	(3)
1997–2011	Dynamo Kyiv	227	(11)
Total		306	(17)

International career^{‡}
1999	Ukraine U-21	1	(0)
2000–2009	Ukraine	67	(0)
- * Club domestic league appearances and goals as of 16 June 2011 ‡ National team caps and goals as of 13 August 2009

Andrey Mykolayovych Nesmachniy (Ukrainian: Андрій Миколайович Несмачний, born 28 February 1979) is a retired Russian-born Ukrainian footballer. He has spent his entire career at Dynamo Kyiv in the Ukrainian Premier League. He was a skillful, attacking left-back who could also play as central defender and left midfielder. Nesmachniy also played for the Ukraine national football team and is the second most capped foreign-born player for Ukraine with 67 matches.

== Club career ==
Andrey Mykolayovych Nesmachniy was born to ethnic Russian parents on 28 February 1979 in Bryansk, Soviet Union. He started as a graduate of the Tavriya Simferopol school. He then joined Dynamo Kyiv in 1996 playing at amateur level for the Dynamo's reserve teams and in the 1997–98 Vyshcha Liha season made his debut for the first team in the away match against FC Metalurh Donetsk (Round 19) on 18 June 1998. He was originally intended for the main team but spent the next two seasons at the reserve team Dynamo-2 Kyiv. Beginning in the 2000–01 season, Nesmachniy appeared much more often on the main team, where he has stayed until 2011. Nesmachniy retired in 2011 to concentrate on his religious beliefs as he became one of Jehovah's Witnesses.

Nesmachniy almost joined Blackburn Rovers of the English Premier League during the January 2007 transfer window. Manager Mark Hughes had confirmed his interest saying that he had "good football intelligence" and "a great international experience". He also confirmed that the defender was training with the squad in late December 2006. However, he did not make a promise that a move was going to be a possibility. Nesmachniy in the end, did not join Blackburn.

== International career ==
Nesmachniy made at least one appearance for the Ukraine national under-21 football team on 9 October 1999 in an away match against Russia national under-21 football team.

Nesmachniy was first called up to the Ukraine national football team in 2000. Since then he has been capped 63 times. His career was highlighted in 2006, when Ukraine made it to their first ever FIFA World Cup. Ukraine made it to the quarterfinals, getting out to eventual champions Italy.

During the World Cup in Germany, Nesmachniy noticeably did not sing the Ukraine national anthem and place his hand on his heart. When asked about this in an interview, Nesmachniy announced that "My parents and I are Jehovah's Witnesses for a long time. Our Bible-based beliefs does not allow us to idolize anyone and anything, such as a flag and an anthem, and to put my hand on my heart. All glory and praise belongs to God, Jehovah."

On 17 March, Nesmachniy announced that he personally decided to retire from the Ukraine national football team, and that he continues to have good relations with head coach Oleksiy Mykhailychenko. He explained his decision by saying that he wants to concentrate on his club career in Dynamo as well as on his spiritual and family life. Upon retiring, Nesmachniy played 67 games for Ukraine, the first being against Bulgaria on 26 April 2000, and the last being on 10 February 2009 against Slovakia.

== Career statistics ==
=== Club ===
Season	Club	League	League		Cup		Europe		Other		Total	
Season	Club	League	Apps	Goals	Apps	Goals	Apps	Goals	Apps	Goals	Apps	Goals
1996–97	Dynamo-3 Kyiv	Amateur League	12	0	—		—		—		12	0
1997–98	Dynamo-3 Kyiv	Second League	19	3	7	0	—		—		26	3
1997–98	Dynamo-2 Kyiv	First League	14	2	—		—		—		14	2
1997–98	Dynamo Kyiv	Vyshcha Liha	1	0	—		—		—		1	0
1998–99	Dynamo-2 Kyiv	First League	22	0	2	0	—		—		24	0
1999–00	Dynamo-2 Kyiv	First League	12	1	—		—		—		12	1
1999–00	Dynamo Kyiv	Vyshcha Liha	16	0	3	0	4	0	—		23	0
2000–01	Dynamo Kyiv	Vyshcha Liha	25	3	—		8	0	—		33	3
2001–02	Dynamo Kyiv	Vyshcha Liha	21	2	4	1	8	0	—		33	3
2002–03	Dynamo Kyiv	Vyshcha Liha	29	0	5	0	10	0	—		44	0
2003–04	Dynamo Kyiv	Vyshcha Liha	15	1	2	0	8	0	—		25	1
2004–05	Dynamo Kyiv	Vyshcha Liha	25	0	4	0	4	0	—		33	0
2005–06	Dynamo Kyiv	Vyshcha Liha	19	0	3	0	2	0	1	0	25	0
2006–07	Dynamo Kyiv	Vyshcha Liha	21	3	5	0	3	0	—		29	3
2007–08	Dynamo Kyiv	Vyshcha Liha	17	0	3	0	4	0	—		24	0
2008–09	Dynamo Kyiv	Premier League	22	2	2	0	11	0	1	0	36	2
2009–10	Dynamo Kyiv	Premier League	13	0	1	0	—		—		14	0
2010–11	Dynamo Kyiv	Premier League	3	0	1	0	1	0	—		5	0
Dynamo-3 Kyiv			31	3	7	0	—		—		38	3
Dynamo-2 Kyiv			48	3	2	0	—		—		50	3
Dynamo Kyiv			227	11	33	1	63	0	2	0	325	12
Career total			306	17	42	1	63	0	2	0	413	18

== Honours ==
Dynamo-2 Kyiv

- Ukrainian First League (2): 1998–99, 1999–2000

Dynamo Kyiv

- Ukrainian Premier League (7): 1997–98, 1999–2000, 2000–01, 2002–03, 2003–04, 2006–07, 2008–09
- Ukrainian Cup (5): 1999–2000, 2002–2003, 2004–05, 2005–06, 2006–07
- Ukrainian Super Cup (1): 2004
