= Tiberiu Ghioane =

Romanian footballer

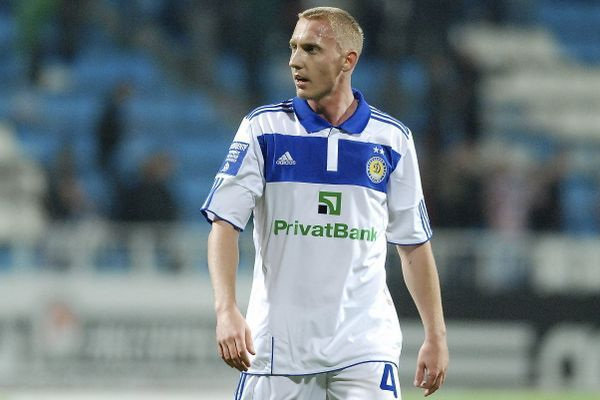
- Ghioane in 2010

Personal information
- Date of birth: 18 June 1981 (age 45)
- Place of birth: Târgu Secuiesc, Romania
- Height: 1.81 m (5 ft 11 in)
- Position: Midfielder

Youth career
- 1987–1998: ICIM Brașov
- 1998–1999: FC Brașov

Senior career*
Years	Team	Apps	(Gls)
1999	FC Brașov	1	(0)
2000–2001	Rapid București	16	(1)
2001–2011	Dynamo Kyiv	168	(32)
2001–2003	Dynamo-2 Kyiv	11	(1)
Total		196	(34)

International career
2000–2003	Romania U21	8	(0)
2001–2010	Romania	21	(2)

Managerial career
- 2013–2014: AS Prejmer
- 2020–2021: Precizia Săcele
- 2021: SR Brașov
- * Club domestic league appearances and goals

Tiberiu Ghioane (born 18 June 1981) is a Romanian former professional footballer who played as a midfielder.

He played most of his career for Dynamo Kyiv, winning multiple trophies. He also represented Romania at international level.

== Club career ==
=== Brașov and Rapid București ===
Ghioane was born on 18 June 1981 in Târgu Secuiesc, Romania and grew up admiring footballer Dennis Bergkamp. He began playing junior-level football in 1987 at ICIM Brașov. In 1998, he moved to FC Brașov. He made his Divizia A debut on 2 October 1999 under coach Ioan Andone in a 2–1 away loss to Rapid București. That would remain his only appearance for FC Brașov as he went together with teammate Gabriel Tamaș to play for Rapid at Mircea Lucescu's request. He scored his first Divizia A goal on 22 April 2001 in a 4–1 victory against Foresta Fălticeni.

=== Dynamo Kyiv ===
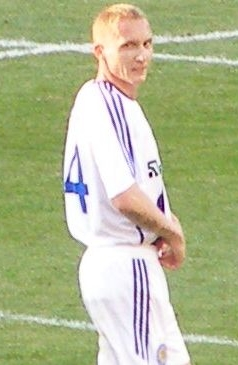
Ghioane playing for Dynamo Kyiv

Ghioane was transferred in June 2001 by Dynamo Kyiv, which paid a $2.5 million fee to Rapid. During his time with Dynamo, he was teammates with fellow Romanians Florin Cernat and Cristian Irimia. Ghioane made his Vyshcha Liha debut on 12 August 2001, playing as a starter under coach Valeriy Lobanovskyi in a 1–0 win over Metalurh Zaporizhzhia. Two weeks later, he scored his first goal in the competition in a 2–0 win over CSKA Kyiv. He made his debut in European competitions by playing and providing an assist to Oleksandr Melashchenko in a 1–1 draw against Steaua București in the 2001–02 Champions League third qualifying round. Dynamo reached the group stage, where Ghioane played in all six games, scoring two goals in losses to Boavista and Liverpool.

The first trophy Ghioane won with Dynamo was the 2002 Commonwealth of Independent States Cup, where in the final, he entered in the 58th minute to replace Vitaliy Kosovskyi in the 4–3 victory against Spartak Moscow. Subsequently, he helped the team win The Double in the 2002–03 season by playing under coach Oleksiy Mykhaylychenko in 25 league matches with two goals scored. In the following season, coach Mykhaylychenko gave him 27 league appearances in which he scored four goals to help the club win another championship. His performances in 2004 earned him the fifth place in the Romanian Footballer of the Year award, tied with Florentin Petre.

In February 2005, Ghioane suffered a cerebral venous sinus thrombosis which kept him off the field for about a year and a half. His first match after this period took place on 17 March 2007 in a 4–0 victory against Zorya Luhansk in which he scored the final goal. That was his only goal in the 11 league appearances made under coach Anatoliy Demyanenko, as Dynamo won the 2006–07 title. Ghioane also played the entire match in the 2–1 win over rivals Shakhtar Donetsk in the 2007 Ukrainian Cup final.

In the 2008–09 season, Ghioane scored a career-best nine league goals in 21 matches under coach Yury Syomin to win his fourth title with Dynamo. During the same season, he helped the club advance past Valencia, Metalist Kharkiv, and Paris Saint-Germain in the UEFA Cup campaign, reaching the semi-finals where they were defeated by Shakhtar. Afterwards, in the 2009 Ukrainian Super Cup, he played as a starter under coach Valery Gazzaev, being substituted by Miloš Ninković in the eventual victory at the penalty shoot-out against Vorskla Poltava. Ghioane made his last appearance in the Ukrainian top-league on 21 May 2011 in a 3–2 away loss to Illichivets Mariupol, totaling 168 matches with 32 goals in the competition. During his years at Dynamo, Ghioane made 56 appearances with two goals scored in European competitions, of which 37 matches and the two goals were in the Champions League group stage across seven seasons.

== International career ==
From 2000 to 2003, Ghioane played eight matches for Romania's under-21 national team.

Ghioane played 21 games and scored two goals for Romania, making his debut on 26 February 2001 under coach László Bölöni in a 1–0 friendly victory against Ukraine. Subsequently, under coach Gheorghe Hagi, he played in both legs of the 3–2 aggregate loss to Slovenia in the 2002 World Cup qualification play-off. He then played in two wins over Bosnia and Herzegovina and Luxembourg, scoring once against the latter during the Euro 2004 qualifiers. In the 2006 World Cup qualifiers, he played only in a 2–0 home loss to the Netherlands. Afterwards, Ghioane was absent from the national team for over four years, coming back during the 2006 World Cup qualifiers in which he made four appearances. He scored his second goal for Romania in a 1–0 friendly victory against rivals Hungary. Ghioane made his last appearance for the national team on 5 June 2010 in a 3–0 friendly win over Honduras.

== Managerial career ==
Ghioane started his managerial career with a stint at Liga V – Brașov County team AS Prejmer, guiding them to earn promotion to the fourth league at the end of the 2013–14 season. In September 2020, after about six years of absence from coaching, he took over Liga IV side Precizia Săcele. In July 2021, he went to coach SR Brașov in Liga III, a spell that lasted until September.

== Style of play ==
Ghioane described his style of play as follows: "I loved it most when it rained. I was happiest playing in the rain—tackles, sliding challenges; you'd catch both the ball and the opponent! I was a very tough player; I had to compensate because I had absolutely no speed... I wasn't violent—God forbid!—I never broke anyone's legs, but I played hard." He also said: "Among my strengths, I'd highlight my technique, which allowed me to handle the ball confidently, and my good vision of the field. I also had a decent shot, so I scored about 40 goals in my career. For my playing position, that's a pretty good result."

== Career statistics ==
=== International ===
Appearances and goals by national team and year
National team	Year	Apps	Goals
Romania	2001	4	0
Romania	2002	6	1
Romania	2003	0	0
Romania	2004	0	0
Romania	2005	1	0
Romania	2009	6	1
Romania	2010	4	0
Total		21	2

Scores and results list Romania's goal tally first, score column indicates score after each Ghioane goal.

List of international goals scored by Tiberiu Ghioane
No.	Date	Venue	Opponent	Score	Result	Competition
1	16 October 2002	Stade Josy Barthel, Luxembourg, Luxembourg	Luxembourg	6–0	7–0	Euro 2004 qualifiers
2	12 August 2009	Stadium Puskás Ferenc, Budapest, Hungary	Hungary	1–0	1–0	Friendly

== Honours ==
Dynamo Kyiv

- Ukrainian Premier League: 2002–03, 2003–04, 2006–07, 2008–09
- Ukrainian Cup: 2002–03, 2004–05, 2005–06, 2006–07
- Ukrainian Super Cup: 2004, 2006, 2007, 2009
- Independent States Cup: 2002

Individual

- Romanian Footballer of the Year (fifth place): 2004
