= Oleh Dopilka =

Ukrainian footballer (born 1986)

Oleh Vasylyovych Dopilka
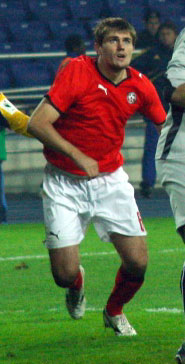

Personal information
- Full name: Oleh Vasylyovych Dopilka
- Date of birth: 12 March 1986 (age 40)
- Place of birth: Kyiv, Ukrainian SSR
- Height: 1.82 m (5 ft 11 1/2 in)
- Position: Defender

Team information
- Current team: FC Uzhhorod

Youth career
- 2001–2003: RVUFK Kyiv
- 2003: Dynamo Kyiv

Senior career*
Years	Team	Apps	(Gls)
2003–2013	Dynamo Kyiv	9	(0)
2003–2004	→ Dynamo-3 Kyiv	26	(0)
2004–2011	→ Dynamo-2 Kyiv	110	(1)
2009	→ Kryvbas Kryvyi Rih (loan)	7	(0)
2011	→ Sevastopol (loan)	11	(0)
2012	→ Oleksandriya (loan)	4	(0)
2012	→ Dynamo-2 Kyiv	3	(0)
2012–2013	→ Hoverla Uzhhorod (loan)	9	(0)
2013–2016	Zirka Kropyvnytskyi	56	(1)
2017–2018	Mynai	?	(?)
2018–2020	Mynai	26	(0)
2021–	Uzhhorod	0	(0)

International career^{‡}
2004	Ukraine-18	1	(0)
2004–2005	Ukraine-19	11	(0)
2005	Ukraine-20	5	(0)
2006–2008	Ukraine-21	19	(0)
2008	Ukraine	2	(0)
- * Club domestic league appearances and goals as of 9 February 2021 ‡ National team caps and goals as of 13 August 2016

Oleh Dopilka (Ukrainian: Олег Васильович Допілка; born 12 March 1986 in Kiev, Ukrainian SSR) is a Ukrainian football defender who plays for FC Uzhhorod.

== Career ==
When he was younger, Dopilka played for Dynamo's reserve team Dynamo-2 Kyiv, which participates Ukrainian First League. Dopilka has also played for the Ukraine national under-21 football team but was promoted in 2007 to the senior Ukraine national football team.

== See also ==
- 2005 FIFA World Youth Championship squads#Ukraine
