= Stanislav Bohush =

Ukrainian footballer

Stanislav Bogush
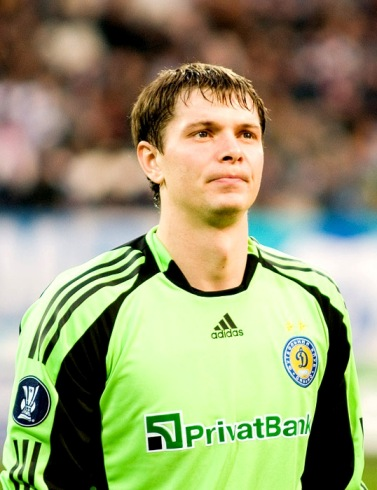

Personal information
- Full name: Stanislav Oleksandrovych Bogush
- Date of birth: 25 October 1983 (age 43)
- Place of birth: Zaporizhzhia, Soviet Union
- Height: 1.92 m (6 ft 4 in)
- Position: Goalkeeper

Youth career
- Metalurh Zaporizhzhia

Senior career*
Years	Team	Apps	(Gls)
2003–2006	Metalurh-2 Zaporizhzhia	72	(0)
2004–2008	Metalurh Zaporizhzhia	22	(0)
2008–2013	Dynamo Kyiv	25	(0)
2013	Arsenal Kyiv	0	(0)
2014–2016	Vorskla Poltava	34	(0)
2017	Kolos Lazirky	?	(0)

International career^{‡}
2001–2002	Ukraine U19	5	(0)
2003–2004	Ukraine U21	3	(0)
2008–2009	Ukraine	2	(0)
- * Club domestic league appearances and goals as of 23 June 2017 ‡ National team caps and goals as of 23 June 2017

Stanislav Oleksandrovych Bogush (Ukrainian: Станiслав Олександрович Богуш; born 25 October 1983) is a Ukrainian retired professional football goalkeeper.

== Career ==
Bohush is a product of the Metalurh Zaporizhzhia Youth system. He gave his debut for the senior team on 14 March 2004, at a home game against Dnipro Dnipropetrovsk, in which the Metalurh Zaporizhzhia finished in a 0:0 draw. He made his Champions League debut against Spartak Moscow in a 4–1 win for Kyiv.

=== Honours ===
In 2003 Bohush was recognized as the best goalkeeper at the L'Alcúdia International Football Tournament.

After playing an away match on 3 August 2008, against rivals Zorya Luhansk, Bohush was named by UA-Football and by magazine Sport-express in Ukraine (Спорт-экспресс в Украине) as the best goalkeeper of the third round.

=== Dynamo Kyiv ===
On Monday, 11 August 2008, Stanyslav Bohush signed a 5-year contract with Ukrainian giants Dynamo Kyiv where he should fill in the vacant spot in the club's official squad for the UEFA Champions League third qualifying round game against Spartak Moskva. He was invited by Dynamo Kyiv vice-president Leonid Ashkenazi to play for the team.

Bohush gave his debut for Dynamo against his former team Metalurh Zaporizhzhia on Sunday, 17 August 2008, during which Dynamo Kyiv won 2:0 and Bohush had to make two saves. He soon replaced Oleksandr Shovkovskyi as the main goalkeeper of Dynamo.

== International ==
Stanyslav Bohush has played for the Ukraine national under-19 and under-21 football teams.

After several outstanding performances in UEFA Champions League matches for Dynamo during which he was even named "Man of the Match", Ukraine's head coach called him up to the senior national team for the first time for a World Cup Qualifying Match against Croatia.
