= Oleksandr Romanchuk (footballer, born 1984) =

Ukrainian football player (born 1984)

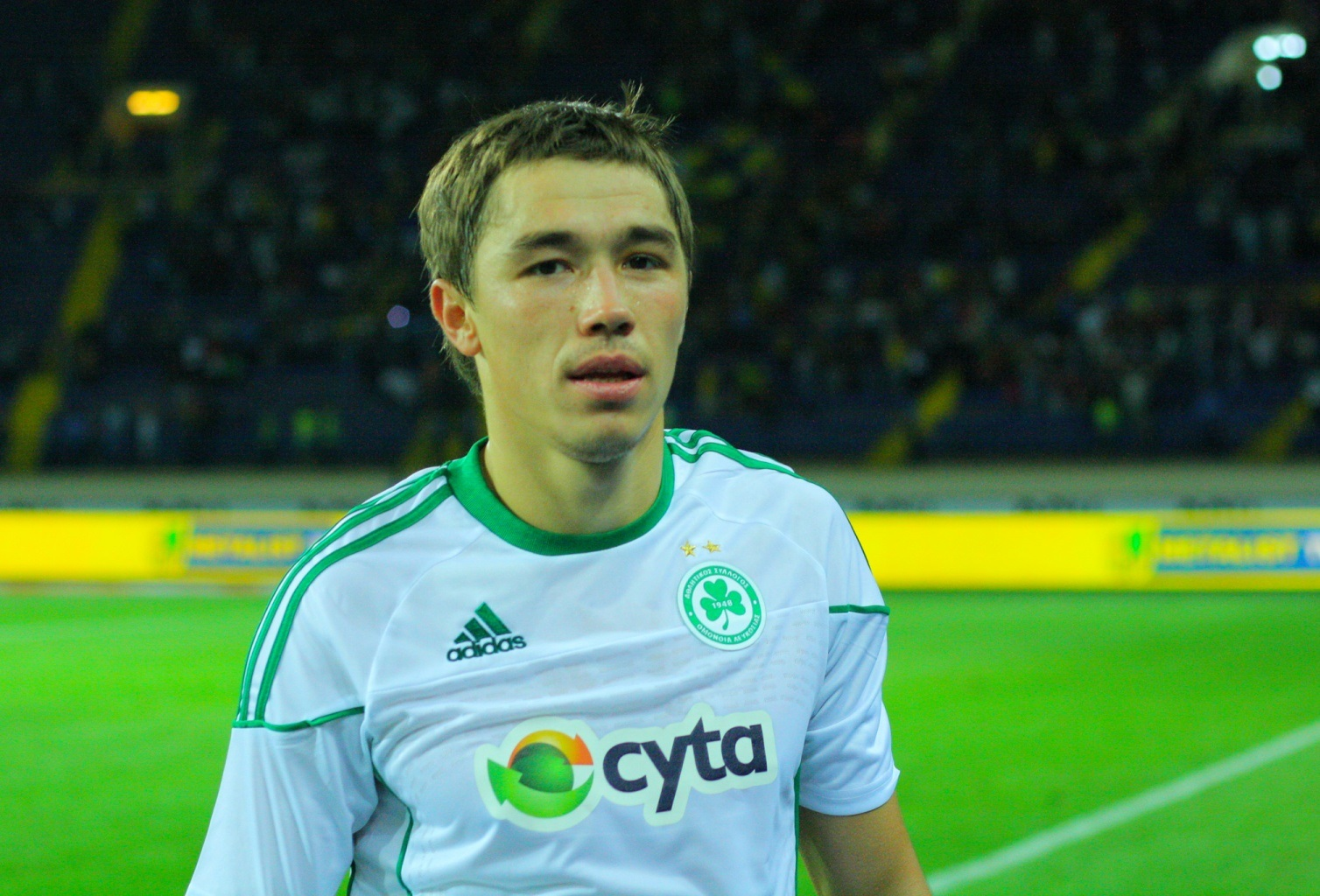

Personal information
- Full name: Oleksandr Volodymyrovych Romanchuk
- Date of birth: 21 October 1984 (age 42)
- Place of birth: Kyiv, Ukrainian SSR
- Height: 1.78 m (5 ft 10 in)
- Position: Defender

Youth career
- 1998–2001: Arsenal Kyiv

Senior career*
Years	Team	Apps	(Gls)
2001	Yevropa Pryluky	1	(0)
2002–2004	Desna Chernihiv	24	(0)
2004–2010	Dynamo Kyiv	6	(0)
2004–2008	→ Dynamo-2 Kyiv	28	(1)
2004	→ Dynamo-3 Kyiv	1	(0)
2006	→ Arsenal Kyiv (loan)	21	(1)
2007	→ Dnipro Dnipropetrovsk (loan)	7	(0)
2007	→ Arsenal Kyiv (loan)	16	(0)
2009–2010	→ Arsenal Kyiv (loan)	11	(0)
2010–2013	Metalist Kharkiv	28	(0)
2012	→ Volyn Lutsk (loan)	3	(0)
2012	→ Tavriya Simferopol (loan)	12	(0)
2013	→ Arsenal Kyiv (loan)	9	(1)
2013	Arsenal Kyiv	12	(0)
2014–2015	Vorskla Poltava	6	(0)

International career^{‡}
2004–2006	Ukraine-21	20	(0)
2007–2011	Ukraine	8	(0)
Medal record
Men's football
Representing Ukraine
UEFA European Under-21 Championship
Runner-up	2006 Portugal
- * Club domestic league appearances and goals as of 10 January 2015 ‡ National team caps and goals as of 24 June 2015

Oleksandr Volodymyrovych Romanchuk (Ukrainian: Олександр Володимирович Романчук; born 21 October 1984) is a Ukrainian former football player.

== International career ==
Romanchuk has been capped 3 times so far. He debuted in a friendly match against Israel on 7 February 2007.

== Honours ==
Dynamo Kyiv

- Ukrainian Premier League: 2008–09

Metalist Kharkiv

- Ukrainian Premier League: Runner-Up 2012–13

Ukraine under-21s

- UEFA Under-21 Championship: runner-up 2006
