= Taras Lutsenko =

Ukrainian footballer

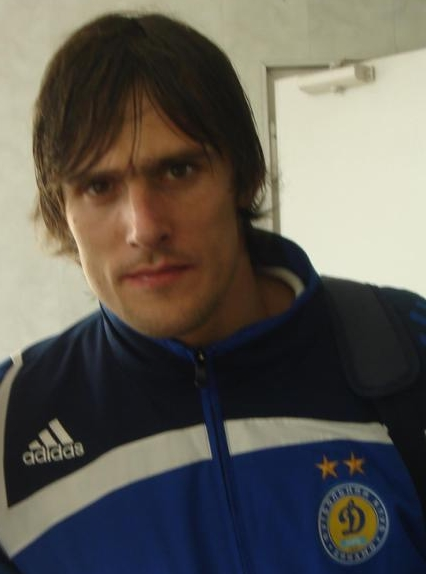
- Lutsenko in 2008

Personal information
- Full name: Taras Volodymyrovych Lutsenko
- Date of birth: 1 February 1974 (age 52)
- Place of birth: Kyiv, Ukrainian SSR, Soviet Union
- Height: 1.91 m (6 ft 3 in)
- Position: Goalkeeper

Team information
- Current team: Dynamo Kyiv (goalkeeping coach)

Senior career*
| Years | Team | Apps | (Gls) |
| 1991–1998 | Dynamo Kyiv | 0 | (0) |
| 1992–1998 | Dynamo-2 Kyiv | 115 | (0) |
| 1994–1995 | → Nyva Vinnytsia (loan) | 3 | (0) |
| 1997–1998 | Dynamo-3 Kyiv | 23 | (0) |
| 1999–2001 | Uralan Elista | 11 | (0) |
| 2004–2005 | Zakarpattia Uzhhorod | 35 | (0) |
| 2005–2008 | Dynamo Kyiv | 8 | (0) |
| 2005–2008 | Dynamo-2 Kyiv | 25 | (0) |
| Total | | 220 | (0) |
- * Club domestic league appearances and goals

Taras Lutsenko (Ukrainian: Тарас Володимирович Луценко; born 1 February 1974) is a Ukrainian former professional footballer who played as a goalkeeper. He currently serves as a goalkeeping coach of Ukrainian Premier League club Dynamo Kyiv.

== Biography ==
Taras Lutsenko was born and raised in a sports family. His mother was a basketball player, and later worked as a physical education teacher, His father played football, then worked as an athletics coach.. Taras was involved in both football and hockey for a long time. He was also involved in athletics. After the 8th grade, Lutsenko entered the Kyiv sports boarding school.
