= 2003–04 Vyshcha Liha =

13th season of top-tier football league in Vyshcha Liha

Vyshcha Liha
- Season: 2003–04
- Champions: Dynamo Kyiv; 11th title
- Relegated: Metalist Kharkiv; Polihraftekhnika Oleksandriia
- Champions League: Dynamo Kyiv; Shakhtar Donetsk
- UEFA Cup: Metalurh Donetsk; Dnipro Dnipropetrovsk; Illychivets Mariupol
- Matches played: 240
- Goals scored: 557 (2.32 per match)
- Top goalscorer: (18) Georgi Demetradze (Metalurh Donetsk)
- Biggest home win: Dynamo - Kryvbas 6:0
- Biggest away win: Arsenal - Dynamo 1:6
- Highest scoring: Arsenal - Dynamo 1:6
- Average attendance: 7,725

The 2003–04 Vyshcha Liha season was the 13th since its establishment. The season began on 12 July 2003 with seven games of the first season round. FC Dynamo Kyiv were the defending champions, having won their 11th league title in the 2002–03 season and they successfully defended their title by winning the championship in the last round of the competition.

A total of sixteen teams participated in the league, the best fourteen sides of the 2002–03 season and two promoted clubs from the 2002–03 Ukrainian First League.

The competition had a winter break which began on 11 November 2003 and the season resumed on 14 March 2004. The season concluded on 19 June 2004.

== Teams ==
=== Promotions ===
- Zirka Kirovohrad, the winners of the 2002–03 Ukrainian First League – (returning after absence of 3 seasons)
- Borysfen Boryspil, the runners-up of the 2002–03 Ukrainian First League – (debut)

=== Renamed ===
- Vorskla Poltava changed its name to FC Vorskla-Naftohaz Poltava before the start of the season.
- On February 10–17, 2004 Metalurh Zaporizhya carried the name of FC Metalurh-Zaporizhya Zaporizhya.

=== Location ===
Locations of teams home grounds in Ukrainian Premier League 2003-04

== League table ==
Pos	Team	Pld	W	D	L	GF	GA	GD	Pts	Qualification or relegation
1	Dynamo Kyiv (C)	30	23	4	3	68	20	+48	73	Qualification to Champions League third qualifying round
2	Shakhtar Donetsk	30	22	4	4	62	19	+43	70	Qualification to Champions League second qualifying round
3	Dnipro Dnipropetrovsk	30	16	9	5	44	23	+21	57	Qualification to UEFA Cup second qualifying round
4	Metalurh Donetsk	30	14	10	6	51	34	+17	52	Qualification to UEFA Cup second qualifying round
5	Chornomorets Odesa	30	11	12	7	38	33	+5	45	
6	Obolon Kyiv	30	11	8	11	34	35	−1	41	
7	Borysfen Boryspil	30	11	8	11	25	29	−4	41	
8	Illichivets Mariupol	30	10	10	10	34	36	−2	40	Qualification to UEFA Cup first qualifying round
9	Arsenal Kyiv	30	10	7	13	38	44	−6	37	
10	Kryvbas Kryvyi Rih	30	10	6	14	26	41	−15	36	
11	Metalurh Zaporizhzhia	30	8	8	14	26	40	−14	32	
12	Tavriya Simferopol	30	7	11	12	22	28	−6	32	
13	Volyn Lutsk	30	7	8	15	25	44	−19	29	
14	Vorskla-Naftohaz Poltava	30	6	9	15	26	49	−23	27	
15	Karpaty Lviv (R)	30	6	8	16	22	39	−17	26	Relegated to Ukrainian First League
16	Zirka Kirovohrad (R)	30	3	8	19	16	43	−27	14	Relegated to Ukrainian Second League

Source: uafootball.net.ua
(C) Champions; (R) Relegated

== Results ==
Home \ Away	ARK	BOR	CHO	DNI	DYN	ILL	KAR	KRY	MDO	MZA	OBO	SHA	TAV	VOL	VOR	ZIR
Arsenal Kyiv	—	2–0	2–1	1–1	1–6	0–2	2–3	2–0	2–3	2–1	2–1	0–0	1–0	1–0	4–0	3–1
Borysfen Boryspil	0–2	—	1–1	0–2	2–0	1–1	0–0	2–1	1–1	1–0	1–0	0–1	1–0	1–0	2–0	1–0
Chornomorets Odesa	1–1	1–0	—	2–1	1–0	2–1	1–0	3–0	1–1	2–1	0–2	2–0	2–0	1–1	2–0	0–0
Dnipro	0–0	0–1	1–0	—	1–0	2–0	4–1	2–1	0–0	0–0	1–0	1–0	3–1	5–1	2–1	1–0
Dynamo Kyiv	3–0	3–0	4–2	2–1	—	2–0	1–0	6–0	2–1	2–0	2–0	1–1	0–0	5–1	2–1	2–0
Illichivets Mariupol	2–1	0–0	1–2	3–1	0–1	—	2–1	1–0	2–2	1–1	1–1	0–2	1–1	2–0	1–0	1–0
Karpaty Lviv	0–0	2–3	1–1	0–0	3–4	1–1	—	4–1	0–2	1–0	1–0	1–2	1–0	0–1	0–1	0–0
Kryvbas Kryvyi Rih	1–1	1–0	3–3	1–2	0–1	0–3	0–2	—	0–0	1–0	1–0	1–0	1–0	3–0	3–1	1–0
Metalurh Donetsk	4–2	2–0	2–1	3–1	0–3	5–1	0–0	1–2	—	4–2	0–0	1–3	1–1	1–0	2–2	1–0
Metalurh Zaporizhzhia	1–0	1–0	2–2	0–0	2–2	0–0	2–0	1–0	1–4	—	3–2	0–3	1–0	0–0	1–1	3–1
Obolon Kyiv	3–1	3–3	1–0	2–2	0–4	0–2	1–0	1–1	2–1	1–0	—	3–4	1–0	1–0	1–0	3–0
Shakhtar Donetsk	2–1	1–0	4–1	1–1	2–4	2–0	5–0	0–0	2–0	5–0	2–0	—	2–0	3–1	4–0	3–0
Tavriya Simferopol	1–1	1–2	0–0	0–2	0–0	1–0	1–0	2–1	1–1	2–0	1–1	1–2	—	1–0	3–1	2–0
Volyn Lutsk	2–1	1–0	1–1	2–2	0–2	2–2	1–0	2–0	1–3	1–0	1–1	0–2	1–1	—	0–1	3–1
Vorskla-Naftohaz Poltava	4–2	1–1	1–1	0–2	1–3	3–1	0–0	1–1	1–3	1–0	0–2	0–3	0–0	2–2	—	1–1
Zirka Kirovohrad	1–0	1–1	1–1	0–3	0–1	2–2	3–0	0–1	0–2	1–3	1–1	0–1	1–1	1–0	0–1	—

Source: uafootball.net.ua
Legend: Blue = home team win; Yellow = draw; Red = away team win.

== Top goal scorers ==
(Georgia (country)) Georgi Demetradze	Metalurh Donetsk	18 (5)
(Ukraine) Oleksandr Kosyrin	Chornomorets Odesa	14 (3)
(Uzbekistan) Maksim Shatskikh	Dynamo Kyiv	10
(Federal Republic of Yugoslavia) Zvonimir Vukic	Shakhtar Donetsk	10
(Ukraine) Andriy Vorobei	Shakhtar Donetsk	9
(Belarus) Valentin Belkevich	Dynamo Kyiv	9(1)
(Ukraine) Oleh Venglinsky	Dnipro Dnipropetrovsk	9(1)
(Ukraine) Kostantyn Balabanov	Chornomorets Odesa	8
(Ukraine) Serhiy Shyschenko	Illychivets Mariupol	8
(Ukraine) Yuriy Tselykh	Vorskla Poltava	8
