= Pape Diakhaté =

Senegalese footballer (born 1984)

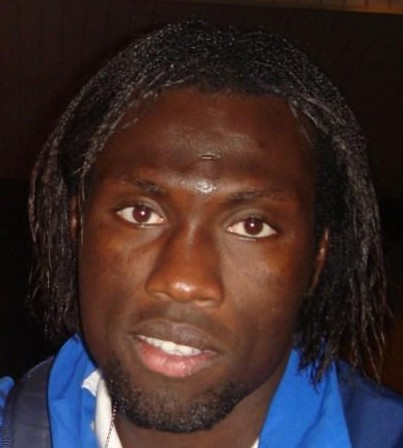
- Diakhaté in 2008

Personal information
- Full name: Pape Malickou Diakhaté
- Date of birth: 21 June 1984 (age 42)
- Place of birth: Dakar, Senegal
- Height: 1.84 m (6 ft 0 in)
- Position: Centre-back

Youth career
- Ouakam
- Nancy

Senior career*
Years	Team	Apps	(Gls)
2001–2007	Nancy	141	(3)
2007–2011	Dynamo Kyiv	37	(1)
2010	→ Saint-Étienne (loan)	18	(1)
2010–2011	→ Lyon (loan)	24	(1)
2011–2015	Granada	43	(0)
2014	→ Erciyesspor (loan)	20	(0)
2016	Nancy	5	(0)
2017	FC Lunéville	4	(0)
Total		293	(7)

International career
2005–2012	Senegal	39	(0)
- * Club domestic league appearances and goals

Pape Malickou Diakhaté (born 21 June 1984) is a Senegalese former professional footballer who played as a central defender.

== Club career ==
Diakhaté was born in Dakar, Senegal. Having come through the Nancy youth ranks, he made his Ligue 2 debut on 20 October 2001, playing the first half of the 2–0 win over Châteauroux. He played 25 league matches the following season, and appeared regularly for the club, although his 2003–04 season was severely disrupted by injury. 2004–05 brought Diakhaté favourable recognition, winning a place in France Football's team of the season.

On 18 July 2007, it was announced that Diakhaté had signed a contract with Ukrainian club Dynamo Kyiv for a €4 million transfer fee. He made his debut for Dynamo on 1 August 2007 in a league fixture against Chornomorets Odesa. He quickly established himself in the first team and even captained the club on occasion. A month later, on 1 September, he broke a collar bone in a match against FC Kharkiv, but once recovered returned to the team. On 16 December 2009, he left Dynamo Kyiv, and returned to France signing a half-year loan contract with Saint-Étienne. The following season he was loaned to Lyon.

On 26 August 2011, Diakhaté signed for Spanish club Granada, for a club record transfer fee of €4.5 million on a four-year contract.

In January 2016, he joined former club Nancy signing a contract until the end of the season. Having made few appearances due to back problems, he left the club at the end of his contract.

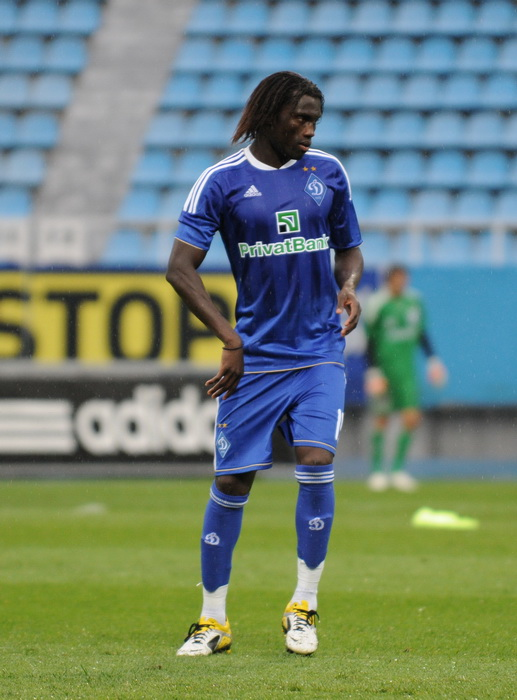
Diakhaté playing for Dynamo Kyiv

In August 2017, after a year without a club, Diakhaté signed with fifth-tier side FC Lunéville. He played for the club on the first four matchdays before being reported as injured. In October, he agreed to the termination of his contract.

== International career ==
Diakhaté was first called up to the Senegal national team in 2005 and made his international debut on 5 June of the same year in a 2006 FIFA World Cup qualification match against the Togo. He subsequently became a regular member of the national squad, featuring primarily as a centre-back and contributing to the team's defence.

He participated in the 2006 Africa Cup of Nations, helping Senegal reach the semi-finals. Senegal lost 2–1 to the Egypt in the semi-finals and subsequently lost the third-place play-off against the Nigeria, finishing fourth in the tournament. Diakhaté made four appearances in the competition, including both group-stage and knockout matches.

Diakhaté continued representing Senegal after 2006, appearing in various international qualification matches and friendly fixtures. In 2008, he participated in international matches, including those for the 2010 FIFA World Cup qualification campaign. He continued to receive national team call-ups and remained active on the international stage through 2011 and 2012.

== Position ==
Originally a left-back and capable of playing as a wide midfielder, he is recognised mainly as a centre-back. He has also been known to play in goal for Senegal on numerous occasions.

== Career statistics ==
Appearances and goals by club, season and competition
Club	Season	League			Cup		Europe		Total	
Club	Season	Division	Apps	Goals	Apps	Goals	Apps	Goals	Apps	Goals
Nancy	2001–02	Ligue 2	4	0	0	0	0	0	4	0
Nancy	2002–03	Ligue 2	25	0	2	0	0	0	27	0
Nancy	2003–04	Ligue 2	17	0	1	0	0	0	18	0
Nancy	2004–05	Ligue 2	29	1	1	0	0	0	30	1
Nancy	2005–06	Ligue 1	33	2	3	0	0	0	36	2
Nancy	2006–07	Ligue 1	33	0	3	0	0	0	36	0
Nancy	Total		141	3	10	0	0	0	151	3
Dynamo Kyiv	2007–08	Ukrainian Premier League	16	0	1	0	4	0	21	0
Dynamo Kyiv	2008–09	Ukrainian Premier League	13	1	0	0	10	0	23	1
Dynamo Kyiv	2009–10	Ukrainian Premier League	2	0	0	0	0	0	2	0
Dynamo Kyiv	2011–12	Ukrainian Premier League	6	0	0	0	2	0	8	0
Dynamo Kyiv	Total		37	1	1	0	16	0	54	1
Saint-Étienne (loan)	2009–10	Ligue 1	18	1	5	0	0	0	23	1
Lyon (loan)	2010–11	Ligue 1	24	1	2	1	6	0	32	2
Granada	2011–12	La Liga	11	0	1	0	0	0	12	0
Granada	2012–13	La Liga	18	0	1	0	0	0	19	0
Granada	2013–14	La Liga	14	0	1	0	0	0	15	0
Granada	Total		43	1	3	0	0	0	46	1
Erciyesspor (loan)	2013–14	Süper Lig	13	0	0	0	0	0	13	0
Erciyesspor (loan)	2014–15	Süper Lig	7	0	0	0	0	0	7	0
Erciyesspor (loan)	Total		20	0	0	0	0	0	20	0
Nancy	2015–16	Ligue 2	5	0	0	0	0	0	5	0
Lunéville	2017–18	Championnat National 3	4	0	0	0	0	0	5	0
Career total			293	7	21	1	22	0	328	8

== Honours ==
Nancy

- Coupe de la Ligue: 2005–06

Dynamo Kyiv

- Ukrainian Premier League: 2008/09
- Ukrainian Super Cup: 2011
