= 2006–07 FC Metalist Kharkiv season =

Metalist Kharkiv
2006–07 season
- Chairman: Oleksandr Yaroslavskyi
- Manager: Myron Markevych
- Stadium: OSC Metalist
- Vyshcha Liha: 3rd
- Ukrainian Cup: Semi-finals
- Top goalscorer: League: Oleksandr Rykun (7); All: Oleksandr Rykun (11)

The 2006–07 season was FC Metalist Kharkiv's 62nd season in existence and the club's 3rd consecutive season in the top flight of Ukrainian football. In addition to the domestic league, Metalist Kharkiv participated in that season's edition of the Ukrainian Cup. The season covers the period from 1 July 2006 to 30 June 2007.

== Players ==
=== First team squad ===
Squad at end of season

Note: Flags indicate national team as defined under FIFA eligibility rules; some limited exceptions apply. Players may hold more than one non-FIFA nationality.

No.	Pos.	Nation	Player
—	GK	(Ukraine) UKR	Oleksandr Horyainov
—	GK	(Ukraine) UKR	Oleksandr Humenyuk
—	GK	(Ukraine) UKR	Denys Sydorenko
—	DF	(Ukraine) UKR	Oleksandr Babych
—	DF	(Moldova) MDA	Vitalie Bordian
—	DF	(Belarus) BLR	Alyaksandr Danilaw
—	DF	(Poland) POL	Seweryn Gancarczyk
—	DF	(Senegal) SEN	Papa Gueye
—	DF	(Ukraine) UKR	Oleh Hlushok
—	DF	(Ukraine) UKR	Andriy Khomyn
—	DF	(Ukraine) UKR	Oleksiy Kurilov
—	DF	(Serbia) SRB	Milan Obradović
—	DF	(Ukraine) UKR	Ruslan Petrovych
—	DF	(Ukraine) UKR	Artem Putivtsev
—	DF	(Ukraine) UKR	Yevhen Selin
—	DF	(Ukraine) UKR	Serhiy Skorobrekh
—	DF	(Romania) ROU	Flavius Stoican
—	MF	(Ukraine) UKR	Serhiy Barilko
—	MF	(Ukraine) UKR	Oleksandr Boyko

No.	Pos.	Nation	Player
—	MF	(Brazil) BRA	Jader
—	MF	(Ukraine) UKR	Vitaliy Kazankov
—	MF	(Ukraine) UKR	Taras Kiktyov
—	MF	(Ukraine) UKR	Serhiy Kostyuk
—	MF	(Ukraine) UKR	Oleksiy Oliynyk
—	MF	(Ukraine) UKR	Anton Postupalenko
—	MF	(Ukraine) UKR	Oleksandr Rykun
—	MF	(Ukraine) UKR	Valentyn Slyusar
—	MF	(Ukraine) UKR	Roman Svitlychnyi
—	MF	(Ukraine) UKR	Serhiy Valyayev
—	MF	(Ukraine) UKR	Maksym Yakhno
—	FW	(Ukraine) UKR	Oleksiy Antonov (on loan from Kuban Krasnodar)
—	FW	(Ukraine) UKR	Serhiy Davydov
—	FW	(Serbia) SRB	Marko Dević
—	FW	(Ukraine) UKR	Anatoliy Didenko
—	FW	(Ukraine) UKR	Ruslan Fomin (on loan from Shakhtar Donetsk)
—	FW	(Ukraine) UKR	Andriy Koval
—	FW	(Nigeria) NGA	Onyekachi Nwoha

=== Left club during season ===
Note: Flags indicate national team as defined under FIFA eligibility rules; some limited exceptions apply. Players may hold more than one non-FIFA nationality.

No.	Pos.	Nation	Player
—	GK	(Ukraine) UKR	Yevhen Borovyk (to Kryvbas Kryvyi Rih)
—	MF	(Belarus) BLR	Syarhey Kuznyatsow (to Tavriya Simferopol)

No.	Pos.	Nation	Player
—	FW	(Serbia) SRB	Miljan Mrdaković (to Maccabi Tel Aviv)

== Competitions ==
=== Vyshcha Liha ===
==== League table ====
Pos	Team	Pld	W	D	L	GF	GA	GD	Pts	Qualification or relegation
1	Dynamo Kyiv (C)	30	22	8	0	67	23	+44	74	Qualification to Champions League third qualifying round
2	Shakhtar Donetsk	30	19	6	5	57	20	+37	63	Qualification to Champions League second qualifying round
3	Metalist Kharkiv	30	18	7	5	40	20	+20	61	Qualification to UEFA Cup first round
4	Dnipro Dnipropetrovsk	30	11	14	5	32	24	+8	47	Qualification to UEFA Cup second qualifying round
5	Tavriya Simferopol	30	12	6	12	32	30	+2	42	

Source: uafootball.net.ua
(C) Champions

==== Results ====
22 July 2006 1	Stal Alchevsk	0–1	Metalist Kharkiv	Alchevsk
17:00 EEST (UTC+3)		Report	Slyusar 45'	Stadium: Stal Stadium; Attendance: 4,300; Referee: Oleh Oriekhov

29 July 2006 2	Metalist Kharkiv	2–0	Kharkiv	Kharkiv
17:00 EEST (UTC+3)	Rykun 21'; Kuznyatsow 36'	Report		Stadium: OSC Metalist; Attendance: 12,000; Referee: Serhiy Shebek

4 August 2006 3	Shakhtar Donetsk	5–0	Metalist Kharkiv	Donetsk
19:00 EEST (UTC+3)	Marica 21'; Elano 33', 39'; Tymoshchuk 35'; Byelik 53'	Report		Stadium: RSC Olimpiyskiy; Attendance: 23,000; Referee: Viktor Denysyuk

20 August 2006 4	Metalist Kharkiv	1–1	Karpaty Lviv	Kharkiv
17:00 EEST (UTC+3)	Didenko 66'	Report	Raspopov 7'	Stadium: OSC Metalist; Attendance: 10,500; Referee: Yevhen Abrosimov

27 August 2006 5	Dynamo Kyiv	2–0	Metalist Kharkiv	Kyiv
20:45 EEST (UTC+3)	Rebrov 33' (pen.); Husiev 52'	Report		Stadium: Valeriy Lobanovskyi Dynamo Stadium; Attendance: 5,000; Referee: Viktor Shvetsov

10 September 2006 6	Metalist Kharkiv	4–0	Chornomorets Odesa	Kharkiv
19:00 EEST (UTC+3)	Fomin 17'; Rykun 40' (pen.), 90+2'; Danylovskyi 44' (o.g.)	Report		Stadium: OSC Metalist; Attendance: 12,100; Referee: Ihor Ishchenko

18 September 2006 7	Metalurh Zaporizhzhia	0–0	Metalist Kharkiv	Zaporizhzhia
17:00 EEST (UTC+3)		Report		Stadium: Slavutych-Arena; Attendance: 4,800; Referee: Vitaliy Hodulian

24 September 2006 8	Metalist Kharkiv	0–0	Kryvbas Kryvyi Rih	Kharkiv
19:00 EEST (UTC+3)		Report		Stadium: OSC Metalist; Attendance: 12,000; Referee: Oleh Oriekhov

30 September 2006 9	Zorya Luhansk	2–2	Metalist Kharkiv	Luhansk
16:00 EEST (UTC+3)	Öwekow 25'; Onyshchenko 52'	Report	Danilaw 41'; Rykun 72'	Stadium: Avanhard Stadium; Attendance: 10,000; Referee: Serhiy Shebek

15 October 2006 10	Arsenal Kyiv	0–0	Metalist Kharkiv	Kyiv
16:00 EEST (UTC+3)		Report		Stadium: NSC Olimpiyskyi; Attendance: 1,000; Referee: Oleh Zubarev

21 October 2006 11	Metalist Kharkiv	1–0	Metalurh Donetsk	Kharkiv
16:00 EEST (UTC+3)	Dević 85'	Report		Stadium: OSC Metalist; Attendance: 10,000; Referee: Viktor Denysyuk

29 October 2006 12	Illichivets Mariupol	0–3	Metalist Kharkiv	Mariupol
16:00 EEST (UTC+3)		Report	Rykun 27' (pen.); Fomin 52'; Slyusar 90+2'	Stadium: Illichivets Stadium; Attendance: 6,500; Referee: Ihor Ishchenko

5 November 2006 13	Metalist Kharkiv	2–1	Vorskla Poltava	Kharkiv
16:00 EEST (UTC+3)	Didenko 46'; Fomin 65'	Report	Shvets 90'	Stadium: OSC Metalist; Attendance: 6,500; Referee: Yevhen Abrosimov

12 November 2006 14	Tavriya Simferopol	2–0	Metalist Kharkiv	Simferopol
16:00 EEST (UTC+3)	Jokšas 26'; Homenyuk 32'	Report		Stadium: RSC Lokomotyv; Attendance: 5,200; Referee: Oleh Derevinsky

19 November 2006 15	Metalist Kharkiv	1–0	Dnipro Dnipropetrovsk	Kharkiv
16:00 EEST (UTC+3)	Danilaw 41'	Report		Stadium: OSC Metalist; Attendance: 14,500; Referee: Vitaliy Hodulian

26 November 2006 16	Metalist Kharkiv	1–0	Stal Alchevsk	Kharkiv
16:00 EEST (UTC+3)	Davydov 57'	Report		Stadium: OSC Metalist; Attendance: 9,000; Referee: Serhiy Shebek

4 March 2007 17	Kharkiv	0–0	Metalist Kharkiv	Kharkiv
16:00 EEST (UTC+3)		Report		Stadium: OSC Metalist; Attendance: 14,000; Referee: Viktor Shvetsov

11 March 2007 18	Metalist Kharkiv	0–1	Shakhtar Donetsk	Kharkiv
18:00 EEST (UTC+3)		Report	Marica 25'	Stadium: OSC Metalist; Attendance: 27,200; Referee: Ihor Pokydko

18 March 2007 19	Karpaty Lviv	Awarded	Metalist Kharkiv	Lviv
EEST (UTC+3)		Report		Stadium: Ukraina Stadium
Note: Karpaty Lviv did not play the match due to the illness of 8 players. Professional Football League of Ukraine (PFL) decided to postpone the match. However, Football Federation of Ukraine (FFU) Control and Disciplinary Committee (CDC) overturned this decision, and the FFU Appeals Committee (AC) confirmed the CDC decision. On 12 April 2007, the PFL Bureau decided to award Metalist with a win and punish Karpaty with a technical defeat.

1 April 2007 20	Metalist Kharkiv	0–2	Dynamo Kyiv	Kharkiv
00:00 EEST (UTC+3)		Report	Rebrov 28', 66'	Stadium: OSC Metalist; Attendance: 28,800; Referee: Yuriy Moseychuk

7 April 2007 21	Chornomorets Odesa	1–3	Metalist Kharkiv	Odesa
16:00 EEST (UTC+3)	Kirlik 31'	Report	Babych 16'; Gancarczyk 69'; Dević 77'	Stadium: Central Stadium Chornomorets; Attendance: 6,500; Referee: Serhiy Shebek

14 April 2007 22	Metalist Kharkiv	1–0	Metalurh Zaporizhzhia	Kharkiv
16:00 EEST (UTC+3)	Didenko 90+2'	Report		Stadium: OSC Metalist; Attendance: 10,000; Referee: Oleh Zubarev

22 April 2007 23	Kryvbas Kryvyi Rih	0–3	Metalist Kharkiv	Kryvyi Rih
17:00 EEST (UTC+3)		Report	Babych 15'; Gancarczyk 86'; Danilaw 90+2'	Stadium: Metalurh Stadium; Attendance: 7,000; Referee: Vitaliy Hodulian

29 April 2007 24	Metalist Kharkiv	1–0	Zorya Luhansk	Kharkiv
19:00 EEST (UTC+3)	Rykun 45+2'	Report		Stadium: OSC Metalist; Attendance: 9,300; Referee: Yevhen Venher

5 May 2007 25	Metalist Kharkiv	5–1	Arsenal Kyiv	Kharkiv
19:00 EEST (UTC+3)	Valyayev 8'; Fomin 45', 62'; Antonov 69', 78'	Report	Zakarlyuka 70'	Stadium: OSC Metalist; Attendance: 10,000; Referee: Yevhen Abrosimov

14 May 2007 26	Metalurh Donetsk	0–2	Metalist Kharkiv	Donetsk
18:00 EEST (UTC+3)		Report	Dević 50'; Babych 67'	Stadium: Central Stadium Shakhtar; Attendance: 3,000; Referee: Ihor Ishchenko

19 May 2007 27	Metalist Kharkiv	2–0	Illichivets Mariupol	Kharkiv
19:00 EEST (UTC+3)	Antonov 6'; Babych 14'	Report		Stadium: OSC Metalist; Attendance: 20,000; Referee: Serhiy Zadiran

23 May 2007 28	Vorskla Poltava	2–2	Metalist Kharkiv	Poltava
18:00 EEST (UTC+3)	Glavina 8'; Kravchenko 68'	Report	Rykun 52' (pen.); Gueye 73'	Stadium: Vorskla Stadium; Attendance: 8,500; Referee: Oleh Derevinsky

10 June 2007 29	Metalist Kharkiv	1–0	Tavriya Simferopol	Kharkiv
18:00 EEST (UTC+3)	Antonov 39'	Report		Stadium: OSC Metalist; Attendance: 13,500; Referee: Vitaliy Hodulian

17 June 2007 30	Dnipro Dnipropetrovsk	0–2	Metalist Kharkiv	Dnipropetrovsk
18:00 EEST (UTC+3)		Report	Dević 52'; Slyusar 67'	Stadium: Meteor Stadium; Attendance: 8,000; Referee: Oleh Oriekhov

=== Ukrainian Cup ===
11 August 2006 Round of 64	Hirnyk-Sport Komsomolsk	1–2	Metalist Kharkiv	Komsomolsk
18:00 EEST (UTC+3)	Malinochka 11'	Report	Rykun 59'; Davydov 78'	Stadium: Yunist Stadium; Attendance: 2,500; Referee: Yevhen Venher

20 September 2006 Round of 32	Enerhetyk Burshtyn	0–2	Metalist Kharkiv	Burshtyn
16:00 EEST (UTC+3)		Report	Davydov 58', 67'	Stadium: Enerhetyk Stadium; Attendance: 3,000; Referee: Yuriy Hrysyo

25 October 2006 Round of 16	Lviv	2–2 (a.e.t.) (6–7 p)	Metalist Kharkiv	Lviv
15:00 EEST (UTC+3)	Derevlyov 23'; Voytovych 63' (pen.)	Report	Didenko 12'; Rykun 18' (pen.)	Stadium: SKA Stadium; Attendance: 5,000; Referee: Yevhen Venher
	Penalties
	Voytovych (penalty scored); Hrytsenko (penalty missed); Bahlay (penalty scored); Derevlyov (penalty scored); Ryabovol (penalty scored); Teplyi (penalty scored); Baranets (penalty scored); Shchastlyvyi (penalty missed)		(penalty scored) Didenko; (penalty missed) Davydov; (penalty scored) Jader; (penalty scored) Oliynyk; (penalty scored) Rykun; (penalty scored) Svitlychnyi; (penalty scored) Gueye; (penalty scored) Kuznyatsow

2 December 2006 Quarter-finals 1st leg	Illichivets Mariupol	0–0	Metalist Kharkiv	Mariupol
16:00 EEST (UTC+3)		Report		Stadium: Illichivets Stadium; Attendance: 6,000; Referee: Andriy Shandor

9 December 2006 Quarter-finals 2nd leg	Metalist Kharkiv	2–0	Illichivets Mariupol	Kharkiv
16:00 EEST (UTC+3)	Fomin 45+2'; Rykun 55' (pen.)	Report		Stadium: OSC Metalist; Attendance: 10,000; Referee: Viktor Shvetsov

18 April 2007 Semi-finals 1st leg	Metalist Kharkiv	0–1	Dynamo Kyiv	Kharkiv
19:00 EEST (UTC+3)		Report	Milevskyi 77'	Stadium: OSC Metalist; Attendance: 20,500; Referee: Vitaliy Hodulian

9 May 2007 Semi-finals 2nd leg	Dynamo Kyiv	4–2	Metalist Kharkiv	Kyiv
18:00 EEST (UTC+3)	Kléber 17'; Rodrigo 23'; Diogo Rincón 84'; Husiev 86'	Report	Fomin 15'} Rykun 49' (pen.)	Stadium: Valeriy Lobanovskyi Dynamo Stadium; Attendance: 10,700; Referee: Anatoliy Zhosan
