= 2005–06 FC Metalist Kharkiv season =

Metalist Kharkiv
2005–06 season
- Chairman: Oleksandr Yaroslavskyi
- Manager: Myron Markevych
- Stadium: OSC Metalist
- Vyshcha Liha: 5th
- Ukrainian Cup: Round of 16
- Top goalscorer: League: Miljan Mrdaković (7); All: Miljan Mrdaković (7)

The 2005–06 season was FC Metalist Kharkiv's 61st season in existence and the club's 2nd consecutive season in the top flight of Ukrainian football. In addition to the domestic league, Metalist Kharkiv participated in that season's edition of the Ukrainian Cup. The season covers the period from 1 July 2005 to 30 June 2006.

== Players ==
=== First team squad ===
Squad at end of season

Note: Flags indicate national team as defined under FIFA eligibility rules; some limited exceptions apply. Players may hold more than one non-FIFA nationality.

No.	Pos.	Nation	Player
—	GK	(Ukraine) UKR	Oleksandr Horyainov
—	GK	(Ukraine) UKR	Oleksandr Humenyuk
—	GK	(Ukraine) UKR	Yevhen Borovyk
—	GK	(Ukraine) UKR	Oleksiy Kyrylenko
—	GK	(Ukraine) UKR	Vadym Kudikov
—	DF	(Ukraine) UKR	Oleksandr Babych
—	DF	(Ukraine) UKR	Oleh Hlushok
—	DF	(Ukraine) UKR	Oleksandr Kucher
—	DF	(Poland) POL	Seweryn Gancarczyk
—	DF	(Belarus) BLR	Alyaksandr Danilaw
—	DF	(Moldova) MDA	Vitalie Bordian
—	DF	(Ukraine) UKR	Andriy Khomyn
—	DF	(Ukraine) UKR	Serhiy Loboyko
—	DF	(Ukraine) UKR	Yevhen Siverchuk
—	DF	(Ukraine) UKR	Dmytro Martyshov
—	MF	(Ukraine) UKR	Roman Svitlychnyi
—	MF	(Ukraine) UKR	Oleksiy Oliynyk
—	MF	(Brazil) BRA	Jader

No.	Pos.	Nation	Player
—	MF	(Ukraine) UKR	Oleh Siroshtan
—	MF	(Ukraine) UKR	Serhiy Kostyuk
—	MF	(Ukraine) UKR	Taras Kiktyov
—	MF	(Ukraine) UKR	Viktor Melnyk
—	MF	(Ukraine) UKR	Valentyn Slyusar
—	MF	(Ukraine) UKR	Serhiy Valyayev
—	MF	(Ukraine) UKR	Ruslan Yarosh
—	MF	(Ukraine) UKR	Andriy Spyevak
—	MF	(Belarus) BLR	Syarhey Kuznyatsow
—	MF	(Ukraine) UKR	Anton Postupalenko
—	FW	(Serbia and Montenegro) SCG	Miljan Mrdaković
—	FW	(Russia) RUS	Yuri Petrov
—	FW	(Russia) RUS	Karen Oganyan
—	FW	(Ukraine) UKR	Anatoliy Didenko
—	FW	(Ukraine) UKR	Serhiy Davydov
—	FW	(Georgia (country)) GEO	Lasha Jakobia
—	FW	(Ukraine) UKR	Ruslan Fomin (on loan from Shakhtar Donetsk)
—	FW	(Ukraine) UKR	Vladyslav Sereda

=== Left club during season ===
Note: Flags indicate national team as defined under FIFA eligibility rules; some limited exceptions apply. Players may hold more than one non-FIFA nationality.

No.	Pos.	Nation	Player
—	GK	(Ukraine) UKR	Oleh Ostapenko (to Inter Baku)
—	DF	(Ukraine) UKR	Andriy Khanas (to Hazovyk-Skala Stryi)
—	DF	(Ukraine) UKR	Oleksiy Kryvosheyev (to Naftovyk-Ukrnafta Okhtyrka)
—	DF	(Russia) RUS	Yevgeni Varlamov (to KAMAZ Naberezhnye Chelny)

No.	Pos.	Nation	Player
—	MF	(Ukraine) UKR	Oleksandr Honchar (to Zorya Luhansk)
—	MF	(Brazil) BRA	Marcos Paulo (to Portuguesa)
—	MF	(Ukraine) UKR	Kostyantyn Yaroshenko (loan return to Shakhtar Donetsk)

== Competitions ==
=== Vyshcha Liha ===
==== League table ====
Pos	Team	Pld	W	D	L	GF	GA	GD	Pts	Qualification or relegation
3	Chornomorets Odesa	30	13	6	11	36	31	+5	45	Qualification to UEFA Cup second qualifying round
4	Illychivets Mariupol	30	12	7	11	30	34	−4	43	
5	Metalist Kharkiv	30	12	7	11	35	42	−7	43	
6	Dnipro Dnipropetrovsk	30	11	10	9	33	23	+10	43	Qualification to Intertoto Cup second round
7	Tavriya Simferopol	30	11	6	13	29	31	−2	39	

Source: uafootball.net.ua
14 May 2006
18:00 LST

Shakhtar Donetsk	2 – 1 (a.e.t.)	Dynamo Kyiv
Marica 59'; Aghahowa 100'	Report	Rodolfo 79'

Metalurh Stadium, Kryvyi Rih
Attendance: 29,734
Referee: Ľ. Micheľ (Slovakia), (FIFA)

==== Results ====
12 July 2005 1	Illichivets Mariupol	0–2	Metalist Kharkiv	Mariupol
19:00 EEST (UTC+3)		Report	Jakobia 32'; Yarosh 88'	Stadium: Illichivets Stadium; Attendance: 10,500; Referee: Vasyl Melnychuk

17 July 2005 2	Metalist Kharkiv	1–0	Kryvbas Kryvyi Rih	Kharkiv
18:00 EEST (UTC+3)	Jakobia 66'	Report		Stadium: OSC Metalist; Attendance: 7,500; Referee: Yuriy Moseychuk

23 July 2005 3	Vorskla Poltava	0–1	Metalist Kharkiv	Poltava
19:00 EEST (UTC+3)		Report	Bordian 6'	Stadium: Vorskla Stadium; Attendance: 5,400; Referee: Viktor Denysyuk

31 July 2005 4	Metalist Kharkiv	2–0	Tavriya Simferopol	Kharkiv
18:00 EEST (UTC+3)	Mrdaković 7', 11'	Report		Stadium: OSC Metalist; Attendance: 14,500; Referee: Serhiy Shebek

6 August 2005 5	Metalurh Donetsk	3–1	Metalist Kharkiv	Donetsk
19:00 EEST (UTC+3)	Shyshchenko 67', 81', 90+4'	Report	Jakobia 87' (pen.)	Stadium: Central Stadium Shakhtar; Attendance: 6,500; Referee: Ihor Ishchenko

20 August 2005 6	Metalist Kharkiv	1–5	Shakhtar Donetsk	Kharkiv
18:00 EEST (UTC+3)	Jakobia 14' (pen.)	Report	Brandão 1', 5', 45', 90'; Fomin 83'	Stadium: OSC Metalist; Attendance: 26,000; Referee: Serhiy Shebek

28 August 2005 7	Chornomorets Odesa	5–2	Metalist Kharkiv	Odesa
19:00 EEST (UTC+3)	Bilozor 23'; Lashankow 44', 52'; Kosyrin 73', 75'	Report	Kucher 9', 17'	Stadium: Central Stadium Chornomorets; Attendance: 9,000; Referee: Vyacheslav Zhukov

11 September 2005 8	Metalist Kharkiv	3–1	Metalurh Zaporizhzhia	Kharkiv
17:00 EEST (UTC+3)	Valyayev 22', 65'; Jakobia 55' (pen.)	Report	Anđelković 51'	Stadium: OSC Metalist; Attendance: 10,000; Referee: Oleh Oriekhov

18 September 2005 9	Dynamo Kyiv	2–2	Metalist Kharkiv	Kyiv
19:00 EEST (UTC+3)	Rebrov 25'; Diogo Rincón 38'	Report	Yarosh 30'; Jakobia 87'	Stadium: Valeriy Lobanovskyi Dynamo Stadium; Attendance: 6,500; Referee: Yevhen Abrosimov

25 September 2005 10	Metalist Kharkiv	1–2	Arsenal Kyiv	Kharkiv
16:00 EEST (UTC+3)	Varlamov 86'	Report	Mizin 1'; Kowalczyk 13'	Stadium: OSC Metalist; Attendance: 14,000; Referee: Ihor Pokydko

2 October 2005 11	Volyn Lutsk	3–0	Metalist Kharkiv	Lutsk
16:00 EEST (UTC+3)	Maksymyuk 18'; Buta 70' (pen.); Sachko 89'	Report		Stadium: Avanhard Stadium; Attendance: 5,500; Referee: Ihor Yarmenchuk

16 October 2005 12	Metalist Kharkiv	1–0	Stal Alchevsk	Kharkiv
16:30 EEST (UTC+3)	Oliynyk 50'	Report		Stadium: OSC Metalist; Attendance: 5,000; Referee: Anatoliy Zhosan

23 October 2005 13	Dnipro Dnipropetrovsk	0–0	Metalist Kharkiv	Dnipropetrovsk
16:00 EEST (UTC+3)		Report		Stadium: Meteor Stadium; Attendance: 3,000; Referee: Oleh Derevinsky

30 October 2005 14	Metalist Kharkiv	4–1	Zakarpattia Uzhhorod	Kharkiv
16:30 EEST (UTC+3)	Bordian 30'; Slyusar 33'; Valyayev 44'; Mrdaković 80'	Report	Ryzhikh 8'	Stadium: OSC Metalist; Attendance: 7,000; Referee: Viktor Denysyuk

5 November 2005 15	Kharkiv	1–0	Metalist Kharkiv	Kharkiv
17:00 EEST (UTC+3)	Berezovchuk 90+2'	Report		Stadium: OSC Metalist; Attendance: 17,000; Referee: Vyacheslav Zhukov

20 November 2005 16	Metalist Kharkiv	1–1	Illichivets Mariupol	Kharkiv
16:30 EEST (UTC+3)	Mrdaković 43'	Report	Kryvosheyenko 55'	Stadium: OSC Metalist; Attendance: 6,500; Referee: Ihor Ishchenko

27 November 2005 17	Kryvbas Kryvyi Rih	2–1	Metalist Kharkiv	Kryvyi Rih
16:00 EEST (UTC+3)	Gigiadze 20' (pen.); Dunjić 65'	Report	Mrdaković 30'	Stadium: Metalurh Stadium; Attendance: 3,000; Referee: Oleh Zubarev

4 December 2005 18	Metalist Kharkiv	0–1	Vorskla Poltava	Kharkiv
15:00 EEST (UTC+3)		Report	Epureanu 82'	Stadium: OSC Metalist; Attendance: 4,000; Referee: Andriy Shandor

10 December 2005 19	Tavriya Simferopol	0–1	Metalist Kharkiv	Simferopol
16:00 EEST (UTC+3)		Report	Yarosh 44'	Stadium: RSC Lokomotyv; Attendance: 4,000; Referee: Oleh Oriekhov

5 March 2006 20	Metalist Kharkiv	2–0	Metalurh Donetsk	Kharkiv
16:00 EEST (UTC+3)	Gancarczyk 65'; Slyusar 80'	Report		Stadium: OSC Metalist; Attendance: 5,000; Referee: Serhiy Berezka

12 March 2006 21	Shakhtar Donetsk	2–0	Metalist Kharkiv	Donetsk
18:00 EEST (UTC+3)	Brandão 25'; Srna 54'	Report		Stadium: RSC Olimpiyskiy; Attendance: 17,000; Referee: Ihor Ishchenko

18 March 2006 22	Metalist Kharkiv	1–1	Chornomorets Odesa	Kharkiv
15:00 EEST (UTC+3)	Kuznyatsow 61'	Report	Kirlik 72' (pen.)	Stadium: OSC Metalist; Attendance: 8,000; Referee: Andriy Shandor

26 March 2006 23	Metalurh Zaporizhzhia	0–0	Metalist Kharkiv	Zaporizhzhia
16:00 EEST (UTC+3)		Report		Stadium: AvtoZAZ Stadium; Attendance: 4,000; Referee: Yevhen Venger

2 April 2006 24	Metalist Kharkiv	1–2	Dynamo Kyiv	Kharkiv
18:00 EEST (UTC+3)	Fomin 37'	Report	Milevskyi 49'; Yeshchenko 65'	Stadium: OSC Metalist; Attendance: 30,000; Referee: Serhiy Zadiran

9 April 2006 25	Arsenal Kyiv	1–1	Metalist Kharkiv	Kyiv
18:00 EEST (UTC+3)	Pershyn 63'	Report	Yarosh 34'	Stadium: NSK Olimpiyskyi; Attendance: 2,800; Referee: Anatoliy Zhosan

16 April 2006 26	Metalist Kharkiv	1–0	Volyn Lutsk	Kharkiv
16:00 EEST (UTC+3)	Slyusar 70'	Report		Stadium: OSC Metalist; Attendance: 10,000; Referee: Serhiy Berezka

22 April 2006 27	Stal Alchevsk	1–1	Metalist Kharkiv	Alchevsk
17:00 EEST (UTC+3)	Nesteruk 7'	Report	Danilaw 57'	Stadium: Stal Stadium; Attendance: 7,000; Referee: Serhiy Shebek

30 April 2006 28	Metalist Kharkiv	0–6	Dnipro Dnipropetrovsk	Kharkiv
16:00 EEST (UTC+3)		Report	Kravchenko 43', 90'; Balabanov 59'; Gancarczyk 63' (o.g.); Danilaw 71' (o.g.); Kornilenko 85'	Stadium: OSC Metalist; Attendance: 10,700; Referee: Vitaliy Hodulian

6 May 2006 29	Zakarpattia Uzhhorod	2–3	Metalist Kharkiv	Uzhhorod
18:00 EEST (UTC+3)	Chuchman 7'; Dombraye 39'	Report	Mrdaković 14', 45'; Kuznyatsow 86'	Stadium: Avanhard Stadium; Attendance: 530; Referee: Oleh Oriekhov

10 May 2006 30	Metalist Kharkiv	1–0	Kharkiv	Kharkiv
18:00 EEST (UTC+3)	Babych 72'	Report		Stadium: OSC Metalist; Attendance: 8,000; Referee: Serhiy Shebek

=== Ukrainian Cup ===
13 August 2005 Round of 64	Dnister Ovidiopol	2–3	Metalist Kharkiv	Ovidiopol
16:00 EEST (UTC+3)	Nehara 63'; Kozakevych 71'	Report	Jader 3'; Kuznyatsow 32'; Sereda 70'	Stadium: Viktor Dukov Dnister Stadium; Attendance: 1,500; Referee: Oleh Oriekhov

21 September 2005 Round of 32	Dnipro Cherkasy	1–2	Metalist Kharkiv	Cherkasy
16:00 EEST (UTC+3)	Polishchuk 51'	Report	Sereda 52'; Svitlychnyi 75'	Stadium: Central Stadium; Attendance: 7,000; Referee: Oleh Shtyka

26 October 2005 Round of 16	Dynamo Kyiv	1–0	Metalist Kharkiv	Kyiv
18:00 EEST (UTC+3)	Milevskyi 68'	Report		Stadium: NSC Olimpiyskyi; Attendance: 6,500; Referee: Vasyl Melnychuk
