= 2004–05 FC Metalist Kharkiv season =

Metalist Kharkiv
2004–05 season
- Chairman: Oleksandr Yaroslavskyi
- Manager: Hennadiy Lytovchenko (until 31 December 2004); Oleksandr Zavarov (from 1 January 2005)
- Stadium: OSC Metalist
- Vyshcha Liha: 11th
- Ukrainian Cup: Round of 32
- Top goalscorer: League: Ruslan Hunchak; Anderson Ribeiro; Serhiy Seleznyov (4 each); All: Ruslan Hunchak; Anderson Ribeiro; Serhiy Seleznyov (4 each)

The 2004–05 season is FC Metalist Kharkiv's 60th season in existence and the club's 1st season after their return to the top flight of Ukrainian football. In addition to the domestic league, Metalist Kharkiv participated in that season's edition of the Ukrainian Cup. The season covers the period from 1 July 2004 to 30 June 2005.

== Players ==
=== First team squad ===
Squad at end of season

Note: Flags indicate national team as defined under FIFA eligibility rules; some limited exceptions apply. Players may hold more than one non-FIFA nationality.

No.	Pos.	Nation	Player
1	GK	(Ukraine) UKR	Oleh Ostapenko
2	MF	(Ukraine) UKR	Serhiy Seleznyov
3	DF	(Moldova) MDA	Serghei Lașcencov
4	DF	(Romania) ROU	Iulian Dăniță
5	DF	(Russia) RUS	Yevgeni Varlamov
6	DF	(Ukraine) UKR	Vladyslav Savchuk
7	DF	(Ukraine) UKR	Andriy Berezovchuk
8	MF	(Brazil) BRA	André Conceição
9	MF	(Moldova) MDA	Valeriu Andronic
10	FW	(Brazil) BRA	Marcelo
11	FW	(Ukraine) UKR	Oleksandr Hladkyi
14	FW	(Georgia (country)) GEO	Lasha Jakobia
15	MF	(Belarus) BLR	Syarhey Kuznyatsow
17	MF	(Ukraine) UKR	Volodymyr Kravchenko
19	MF	(Ukraine) UKR	Oleksandr Pryzetko
21	GK	(Ukraine) UKR	Volodymyr Ovsiyenko
22	MF	(Ukraine) UKR	Eldar Ibrahimov

No.	Pos.	Nation	Player
23	DF	(Belarus) BLR	Alyaksandr Danilaw
24	DF	(Ukraine) UKR	Andriy Khanas
33	DF	(Ukraine) UKR	Serhiy Vetrennikov
35	DF	(Ukraine) UKR	Ruslan Hunchak
—	GK	(Ukraine) UKR	Vadym Kudikov
—	DF	(Ukraine) UKR	Ihor Cherednichenko
—	DF	(Moldova) MDA	Vitalie Bordian
—	MF	(Ukraine) UKR	Roman Svitlychnyi
—	MF	(Ukraine) UKR	Dmytro Batusov
—	MF	(Ukraine) UKR	Kostyantyn Yaroshenko (on loan from Shakhtar Donetsk)
—	FW	(Ukraine) UKR	Valentyn Horkun
—	FW	(Ukraine) UKR	Oleksandr Yakovenko
—	FW	(Ukraine) UKR	Serhiy Pylypchuk
—	FW	(Ukraine) UKR	Ihor Melnyk
—	FW	(Ukraine) UKR	Serhiy Davydov
—	FW	(Ukraine) UKR	Yuriy Tselykh

=== Left club during season ===
Note: Flags indicate national team as defined under FIFA eligibility rules; some limited exceptions apply. Players may hold more than one non-FIFA nationality.

No.	Pos.	Nation	Player
4	DF	(Ukraine) UKR	Oleksandr Hranovskyi (to Arsenal Kharkiv)
5	DF	(Ukraine) UKR	Vitaliy Komarnytskyi (to Arsenal Kharkiv)
10	FW	(Brazil) BRA	Anderson Ribeiro (to Arsenal Kharkiv)
18	DF	(Ukraine) UKR	Volodymyr Samborskyi (to Arsenal Kharkiv)
32	MF	(Ukraine) UKR	Anatoliy Oprya (to Arsenal Kharkiv)

No.	Pos.	Nation	Player
—	GK	(Ukraine) UKR	Andriy Onykiyenko (to Kharkiv)
—	DF	(Ukraine) UKR	Oleksandr Kucher (loan to Arsenal Kharkiv)
—	MF	(Ukraine) UKR	Oleksandr Maksymov (to Arsenal Kharkiv)
—	MF	(Ukraine) UKR	Serhiy Sibiryakov (to Arsenal Kharkiv)
—	FW	(Ukraine) UKR	Dmytro Brovkin (to Obolon Kyiv)

== Competitions ==
=== Vyshcha Liha ===
==== League table ====
Pos	Team	Pld	W	D	L	GF	GA	GD	Pts
9	Arsenal Kyiv	30	9	10	11	30	33	−3	37
10	Metalurh Zaporizhzhia	30	8	11	11	25	32	−7	35
11	Metalist Kharkiv	30	9	7	14	25	37	−12	34
12	Zakarpattia Uzhhorod	30	7	10	13	21	30	−9	31
13	Kryvbas Kryvyi Rih	30	7	10	13	24	38	−14	31

Source: uafootball.net.ua

==== Results ====
15 July 2004 1	Dnipro Dnipropetrovsk	4–2	Metalist Kharkiv	Dnipropetrovsk
19:00 EEST (UTC+3)	Melashchenko 5'; Rotan 32'; Matyukhin 62'; Semochko 83'	Report	Seleznyov 30'; Brovkin 75'	Stadium: Meteor Stadium; Attendance: 8,000; Referee: Ihor Ishchenko

20 July 2004 2	Metalist Kharkiv	1–4	Metalurh Donetsk	Kharkiv
18:00 EEST (UTC+3)	Ribeiro 45'	Report	Gjuzelov 55'; Stolica 71', 90'; Neziri 75'	Stadium: OSC Metalist; Attendance: 15,000; Referee: Vitaliy Hodulian

25 July 2004 3	Vorskla-Naftohaz Poltava	0–1	Metalist Kharkiv	Poltava
18:00 EEST (UTC+3)		Report	Ribeiro 56'	Stadium: Vorskla Stadium; Attendance: 12,000; Referee: Serhiy Shebek

1 August 2004 4	Metalist Kharkiv	3–1	Borysfen Boryspil	Kharkiv
18:00 EEST (UTC+3)	Ribeiro 22'; Berezovchuk 26'; Jakobia 62'	Report	Karamushka 82'	Stadium: OSC Metalist; Attendance: 15,000; Referee: Vyacheslav Zhukov

14 August 2004 5	Metalurh Zaporizhzhia	1–4	Metalist Kharkiv	Zaporizhzhia
18:00 EEST (UTC+3)	Demchenko 41'	Report	Hunchak 1', 57'; Kuznyatsow 49'; Ibrahimov 69'	Stadium: Avto ZAZ Stadium; Attendance: 2,500; Referee: Vasyl Melnychuk

29 August 2004 6	Metalist Kharkiv	1–1	Arsenal Kyiv	Kharkiv
17:00 EEST (UTC+3)	Ribeiro 18'	Report	Amelyanchuk 80'	Stadium: OSC Metalist; Attendance: 18,500; Referee: Ihor Pokydko

19 September 2004 7	Obolon Kyiv	0–0	Metalist Kharkiv	Kyiv
17:00 EEST (UTC+3)		Report		Stadium: Valeriy Lobanovskyi Dynamo Stadium; Attendance: 3,000; Referee: Yuriy Moseychuk

25 September 2004 8	Tavriya Simferopol	1–0	Metalist Kharkiv	Simferopol
17:00 EEST (UTC+3)	Gigiadze 23' (pen.)	Report		Stadium: Tavriya Stadium; Attendance: 3,200; Referee: Oleh Zubarev

3 October 2004 9	Metalist Kharkiv	0–1	Kryvbas Kryvyi Rih	Kharkiv
16:00 EEST (UTC+3)		Report	Kashewski 78'	Stadium: OSC Metalist; Attendance: 12,000; Referee: Serhiy Dzyuba

24 October 2004 10	Shakhtar Donetsk	0–1	Metalist Kharkiv	Donetsk
18:00 EEST (UTC+3)		Report	Hunchak 69'	Stadium: RSC Olimpiyskiy; Attendance: 18,432; Referee: Yevhen Abrosimov

30 October 2004 11	Metalist Kharkiv	1–0	Zakarpattia Uzhhorod	Kharkiv
17:00 EEST (UTC+3)	Hunchak 72'	Report		Stadium: OSC Metalist; Attendance: 16,500; Referee: Anatoliy Zhosan

7 November 2004 12	Volyn Lutsk	4–2	Metalist Kharkiv	Lutsk
17:00 EEST (UTC+3)	Džudović 15'; Mitić 20'; Trišović 54'; Hashchyn 77' (pen.)	Report	Hladkyi 47'; Seleznyov 90+2' (pen.)	Stadium: Avanhard Stadium; Attendance: 7,200; Referee: Oleh Oriekhov

11 November 2004 13	Metalist Kharkiv	1–0	Illichivets Mariupol	Kharkiv
17:00 EEST (UTC+3)	Seleznyov 26' (pen.)	Report		Stadium: OSC Metalist; Attendance: 12,000; Referee: Andriy Shandor

28 November 2004 14	Dynamo Kyiv	3–0	Metalist Kharkiv	Kyiv
17:00 EEST (UTC+3)	Kléber 28'; Yussuf 45'; Verpakovskis 72'	Report		Stadium: Valeriy Lobanovskyi Dynamo Stadium; Attendance: 8,000; Referee: Volodymyr Sirenko

5 December 2004 15	Metalist Kharkiv	0–1	Chornomorets Odesa	Kharkiv
17:00 EEST (UTC+3)		Report	Kosyrin 90+2'	Stadium: OSC Metalist; Attendance: 10,000; Referee: Ihor Ishchenko

1 March 2005 16	Chornomorets Odesa	2–1	Metalist Kharkiv	Odesa
18:00 EEST (UTC+3)	Kosyrin 1', 79'	Report	Kuznyatsow 26'	Stadium: Central Stadium Chornomorets; Attendance: 3,500; Referee: Ihor Ishchenko

6 March 2005 17	Metalist Kharkiv	0–2	Dynamo Kyiv	Kharkiv
17:00 EEST (UTC+3)		Report	Ghioane 44'; Shatskikh 49'	Stadium: OSC Metalist; Attendance: 20,000; Referee: Volodymyr Sirenko

13 March 2005 18	Illichivets Mariupol	1–1	Metalist Kharkiv	Mariupol
15:00 EEST (UTC+3)	Zakarlyuka 78' (pen.)	Report	Yaksmanytskyi 24' (o.g.)	Stadium: Illichivets Stadium; Attendance: 5,000; Referee: Yevhen Abrosimov

20 March 2005 19	Metalist Kharkiv	1–0	Volyn Lutsk	Kharkiv
16:00 EEST (UTC+3)	Jakobia 33'	Report		Stadium: OSC Metalist; Attendance: 4,000; Referee: Oleh Oriekhov

3 April 2005 20	Zakarpattia Uzhhorod	0–0	Metalist Kharkiv	Uzhhorod
16:00 EEST (UTC+3)		Report		Stadium: Avanhard Stadium; Attendance: 4,800; Referee: Ihor Pokydko

10 April 2005 21	Metalist Kharkiv	0–1	Shakhtar Donetsk	Kharkiv
16:00 EEST (UTC+3)		Report	Tymoshchuk 52'	Stadium: OSC Metalist; Attendance: 32,000; Referee: Serhiy Dzyuba

16 April 2005 22	Kryvbas Kryvyi Rih	3–1	Metalist Kharkiv	Kryvyi Rih
16:00 EEST (UTC+3)	Kabanov 26'; Kashewski 55'; Popovici 89'	Report	Kuznyatsow 4'	Stadium: Metalurh Stadium; Attendance: 5,500; Referee: Oleh Oriekhov

24 April 2005 23	Metalist Kharkiv	1–1	Tavriya Simferopol	Kharkiv
15:00 EEST (UTC+3)	Conceição 27'	Report	Litovchenko 12'	Stadium: OSC Metalist; Attendance: 11,000; Referee: Serhiy Shebek

30 April 2005 24	Metalist Kharkiv	0–1	Obolon Kyiv	Kharkiv
15:00 EEST (UTC+3)		Report	Kozyr 42'	Stadium: OSC Metalist; Attendance: 6,500; Referee: Oleh Zubarev

7 May 2005 25	Arsenal Kyiv	0–0	Metalist Kharkiv	Kyiv
17:00 EEST (UTC+3)		Report		Stadium: NSK Olimpiyskyi; Attendance: 2,000; Referee: Yevhen Abrosimov

16 May 2005 26	Metalist Kharkiv	0–0	Metalurh Zaporizhzhia	Kharkiv
18:00 EEST (UTC+3)		Report		Stadium: OSC Metalist; Attendance: 6,500; Referee: Oleh Zubarev

21 May 2005 27	Borysfen Boryspil	0–1	Metalist Kharkiv	Boryspil
17:00 EEST (UTC+3)		Report	Yaroshenko 82'	Stadium: Kolos Stadium; Attendance: 2,500; Referee: Vasyl Melnychuk

28 May 2005 28	Metalist Kharkiv	1–0	Vorskla-Naftohaz Poltava	Kharkiv
18:00 EEST (UTC+3)	Jakobia 45+2'	Report		Stadium: OSC Metalist; Attendance: 9,000; Referee: Oleh Oriekhov

12 June 2005 29	Metalurh Donetsk	3–1	Metalist Kharkiv	Donetsk
18:30 EEST (UTC+3)	Babangida 47'; Mendoza 61'; Touré 74'	Report	Seleznyov 76' (pen.)	Stadium: Central Stadium Shakhtar; Attendance: 3,000; Referee: Ihor Yarmenchuk

16 June 2005 30	Metalist Kharkiv	0–2	Dnipro Dnipropetrovsk	Kharkiv
18:30 EEST (UTC+3)		Report	Yezerskyi 30'; Nazarenko 64'	Stadium: OSC Metalist; Attendance: 6,000; Referee: Ihor Pokydko

=== Ukrainian Cup ===
7 August 2004 Round of 64	Nyva Ternopil	0–1	Metalist Kharkiv	Ternopil
17:00 EEST (UTC+3)		Report	Ibrahimov 47'	Stadium: Ternopil City Stadium; Attendance: 3,000; Referee: Serhiy Shebek

22 August 2004 Round of 32	Stal Alchevsk	2–0	Metalist Kharkiv	Alchevsk
17:00 EEST (UTC+3)	Sernetskyi 27' (pen.), 48'	Report		Stadium: Stal Stadium; Attendance: 6,000; Referee: Volodymyr Sirenko
