= Ribeiro =

Ribeiro is a Portuguese and Galician surname, also common in Brazil. Origin: Latin riparius, ("small stream" or "by the river"). It is also a wine-making region of central Galicia. In Galicia the surname may have been Castilianized as Riveiro.

- Adriano Leite Ribeiro (born 1982), Brazilian football striker
- Aguinaldo Ribeiro (born 1969), Brazilian politician
- Alfonso Ribeiro (born 1971), American actor/game show host
- Alex Ribeiro (born 1948), Brazilian racing driver
- Alexandre Ribeiro (born 1981), Brazilian jiu-jitsu practitioner and mixed martial artist
- Alípio de Miranda-Ribeiro (1874–1939), Brazilian herpetologist and ichthyologist
- Ana Ribeiro (born 1955), Uruguayan historian, writer, and professor
- Ana Júlia Ribeiro (born 2000), Brazilian politician
- Anderson Ribeiro (born 1981), Brazilian football player
- André Ribeiro (1966–2021), Brazilian racing driver
- Antonio Ribeiro (soccer) (born 1980), Canadian football (soccer) player
- António Ribeiro (cardinal) (1928–1998), Catholic cardinal from Portugal
- Áureo Ribeiro (born 1979), Brazilian politician
- Bernard Ribeiro, Baron Ribeiro (born 1944), British surgeon
- Bernardim Ribeiro (1482–1552), Portuguese poet
- Bruno de Paula Ribeiro Ingrácia (born 1983), otherwise known as Bruno Ribeiro, Brazilian footballer
- Bruno Ribeiro (born 1975), Portuguese footballer
- Catherine Ribeiro (1941–2024), French singer
- Christian Ribeiro (born 1989), Welsh footballer
- Darcy Ribeiro, (1922–1997), Brazilian anthropologist
- Diogo Ribeiro (cartographer) (or Diego Ribero) (16th century), Portuguese cartographer and explorer
- Édson Ribeiro (born 1972), Brazilian sprinter
- Fabian Defu Ribeiro (1933–1986), South African doctor and anti-apartheid activist
- Fernanda Ribeiro, Portuguese long-distance runner
- Fernando Ribeiro, Portuguese singer
- Florence Ribeiro (1933–1986), South African anti-apartheid activist
- Gilvan Ribeiro (born 1989), Brazilian canoeist
- Isabel Ribeiro (born 1955), Portuguese robotics engineer
- João Mário Ribeiro (born 1929), Portuguese chess master
- Jorge Ribeiro (born 1981), Portuguese footballer
- Julio Francis Ribeiro (born 1929), former Indian police officer and civil servant
- Lais Ribeiro (born 1989), a Brazilian model
- Lancelot Ribeiro (1933–2010), British painter
- Luiz Claudio Ribeiro (born 1988), Brazilian politician
- Miguel Ribeiro (born 1974), Portuguese screenwriter and filmmaker
- Mike Ribeiro (born 1980), Canadian hockey player
- Pedro Júlio Marques Ribeiro (born 1979), Portuguese footballer
- Pedro Manuel Mendes Ribeiro (born 1983), Portuguese footballer
- Pedro Ribeiro (Brazilian footballer) (born 1990), Brazilian footballer
- Pery Ribeiro (1937–2012), Brazilian singer
- Raúl Casal Ribeiro (1887-1956), Paraguayan vice president
- Regina Lúcia Ribeiro (born 1961), Brazilian chess master
- Robert Ribeiro (born 1949), Hong Kong judge
- Rúben Ribeiro, multiple people
- Sheila Ribeiro (born 1973), Brazilian / Canadian artist
- Wladimir Ribeiro (born 1967), Brazilian swimmer
- Zulaiê Cobra Ribeiro (born 1943), Brazilian lawyer and politician
- Zulmira Ribeiro Tavares (1930-2018), Brazilian poet and writer

== See also ==
- Ribeiro (DO), the Spanish wine-producing region in Galicia
- Ribero (disambiguation)
- Rio (disambiguation)
- Ríos (disambiguation)
