= Papa Gueye =

Senegalese footballer

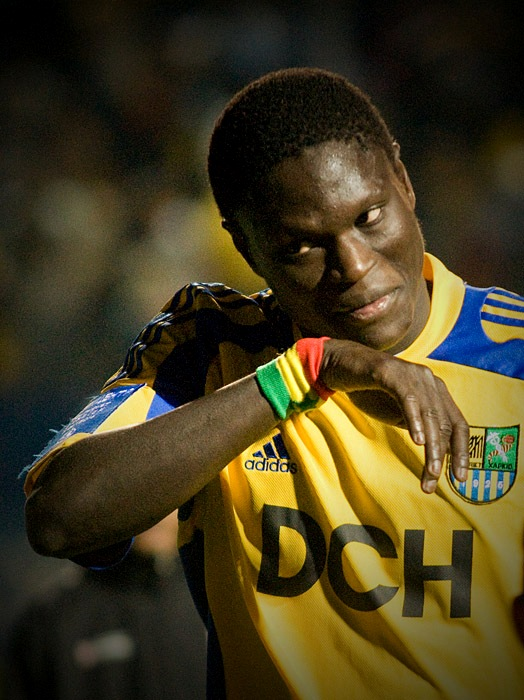
- Gueye with Metalist Kharkiv

Personal information
- Date of birth: 7 June 1984 (age 42)
- Place of birth: Dakar, Senegal
- Height: 1.92 m (6 ft 4 in)
- Position: Centre-back

Team information
- Current team: Metalist Kharkiv (vice-president)

Youth career
- 1999–2002: Douanes

Senior career*
Years	Team	Apps	(Gls)
2002–2004	Douanes	16	(0)
2004–2006	Volyn Lutsk	27	(0)
2006–2015	Metalist Kharkiv	211	(5)
2015–2016	Dnipro Dnipropetrovsk	32	(0)
2016	Rostov	5	(0)
2017	Aktobe	9	(0)
2018–2019	Karpaty Lviv	14	(0)
2019–2020	Dnipro-1	13	(0)
2020–2021	Metalist Kharkiv	8	(1)
Total		335	(6)

International career
2012	Senegal Olympic	4	(0)
2012	Senegal	5	(0)
- * Club domestic league appearances and goals

Papa Gueye (born 7 June 1984) is a Senegalese former professional footballer who played as a centre-back and current vice-president of Metalist Kharkiv.

== Career ==
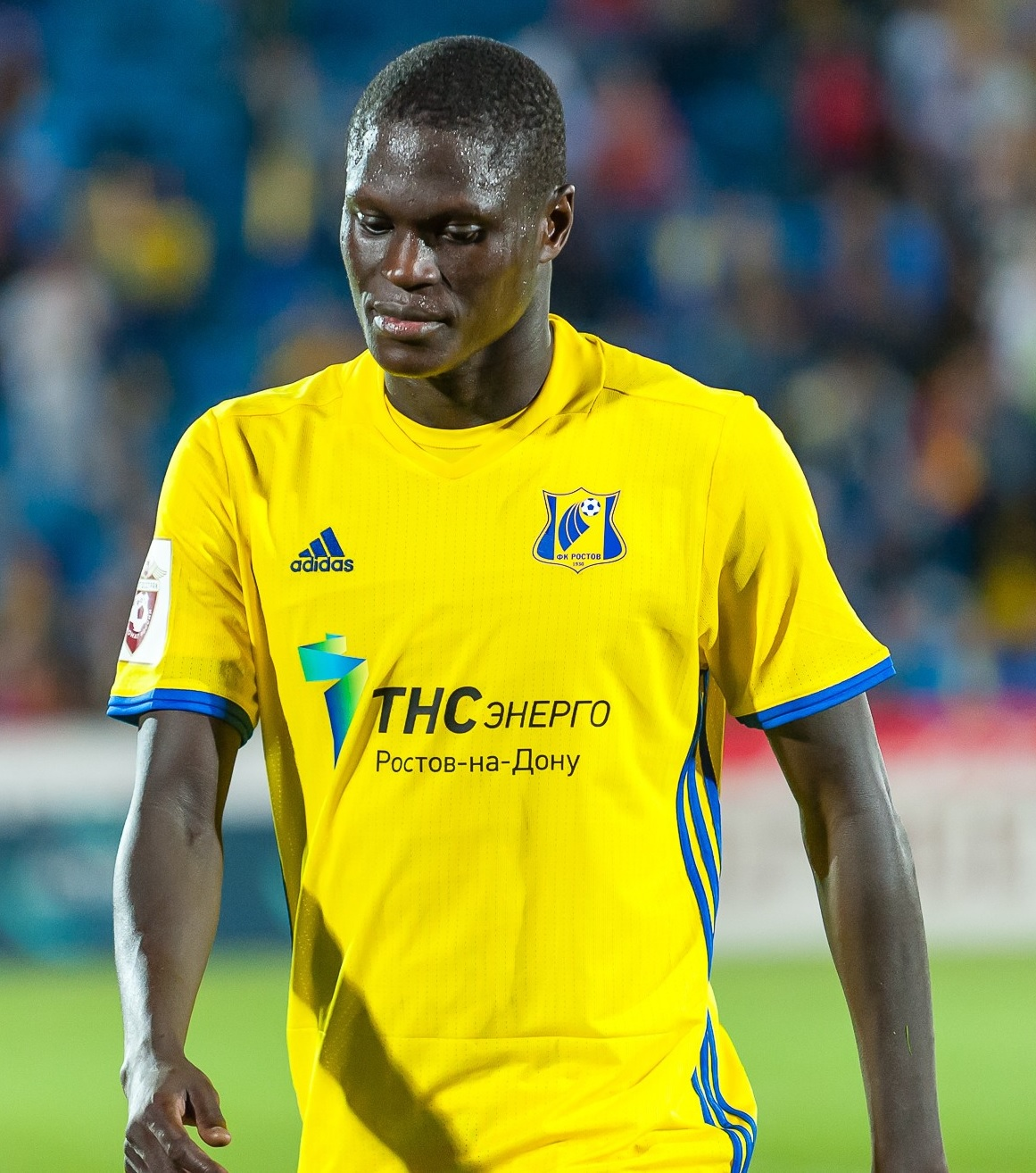
Papa Gueye with Rostov in 2016

Born in Dakar, Senegal, Gueye grew up in a family of school director (father) and a teacher (mother). He started playing football at 6 years old, attending a football club at school. In 1999, he enrolled in the school football club AS Douanes (Senegal).

=== Metalist Kharkiv ===
In 2006 Gueye moved from Volyn Lutsk to Metalist Kharkiv where he played as a central defender and a defensive midfielder. After more than 10 years in Kharkiv he signed a contract with Dnipro Dnipropetrovsk.

=== Rostov ===
On 31 August 2016, Gueye signed for Russian Premier League side FC Rostov.

=== FC Aktobe ===
On 23 February 2017, Gueye signed for Kazakhstan Premier League side FC Aktobe.

=== Dnipro-1 ===
In 2019 he moved from Karpaty Lviv to Dnipro-1.

== International ==
When the Metalist coach Myron Markevych was placed as the head coach of the Ukraine national football team in 2010, there were talks of naturalization of Gueye.

== Career statistics ==
=== Club ===
Appearances and goals by club, season and competition
Club	Season	League			National Cup		Continental		Total	
Club	Season	Division	Apps	Goals	Apps	Goals	Apps	Goals	Apps	Goals
Volyn Lutsk	2004–05	Ukrainian Premier League	12	0	0	0	–		12	0
Volyn Lutsk	2005–06	Ukrainian Premier League	15	0	1	0	–		16	0
Volyn Lutsk	Total		27	0	1	0	0	0	28	0
Metalist Kharkiv	2006–07	Ukrainian Premier League	24	1	6	0	–		30	1
Metalist Kharkiv	2007–08	Ukrainian Premier League	29	0	1	0	–		30	0
Metalist Kharkiv	2008–09	Ukrainian Premier League	25	0	3	0	10	0	38	0
Metalist Kharkiv	2009–10	Ukrainian Premier League	30	2	1	0	4	1	35	3
Metalist Kharkiv	2010–11	Ukrainian Premier League	20	1	0	0	8	0	28	1
Metalist Kharkiv	2011–12	Ukrainian Premier League	24	0	0	0	13	2	37	2
Metalist Kharkiv	2012–13	Ukrainian Premier League	25	0	0	0	10	0	35	0
Metalist Kharkiv	2013–14	Ukrainian Premier League	29	1	3	0	2	0	34	1
Metalist Kharkiv	2014–15	Ukrainian Premier League	5	0	2	0	5	0	12	0
Metalist Kharkiv	Total		211	5	16	0	52	3	279	8
Dnipro Dnipropetrovsk	2014–15	Ukrainian Premier League	10	0	2	0	0	0	12	0
Dnipro Dnipropetrovsk	2015–16	Ukrainian Premier League	22	0	5	0	6	0	33	0
Dnipro Dnipropetrovsk	Total		32	0	7	0	6	0	45	0
Rostov	2016–17	Russian Premier League	4	0	1	0	–		5	0
Aktobe	2017	Kazakhstan Premier League	9	0	1	0	–		10	0
Career total			283	5	26	0	58	3	367	8

=== International ===
Appearances and goals by national team and year
National team	Year	Apps	Goals
Senegal	2012	5	0
Senegal	Total	5	0

== Honours ==
Metalist Kharkiv

- Ukrainian Second League: 2020-21

Dnipro Dnipropetrovsk

- UEFA Europa League Runners-up: 2014–15

== Gallery ==
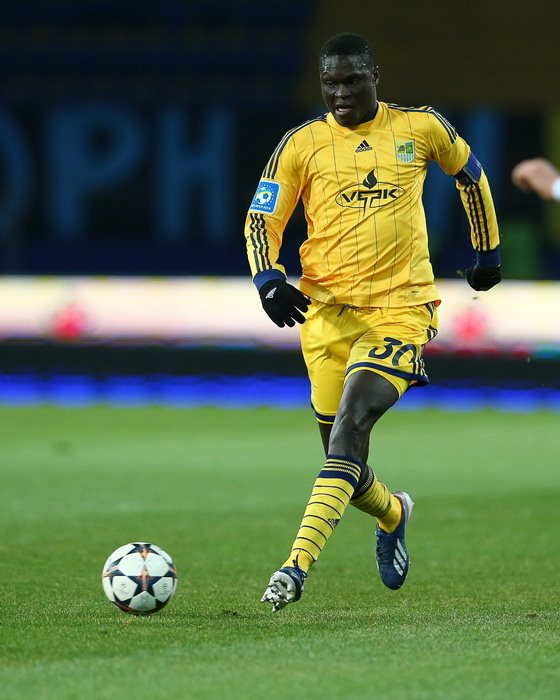
Playing for Metalist against Hoverla Uzhhorod in 2014 in the Ukrainian Premier League

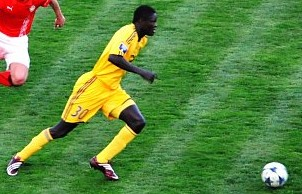
With Metalist in 2010

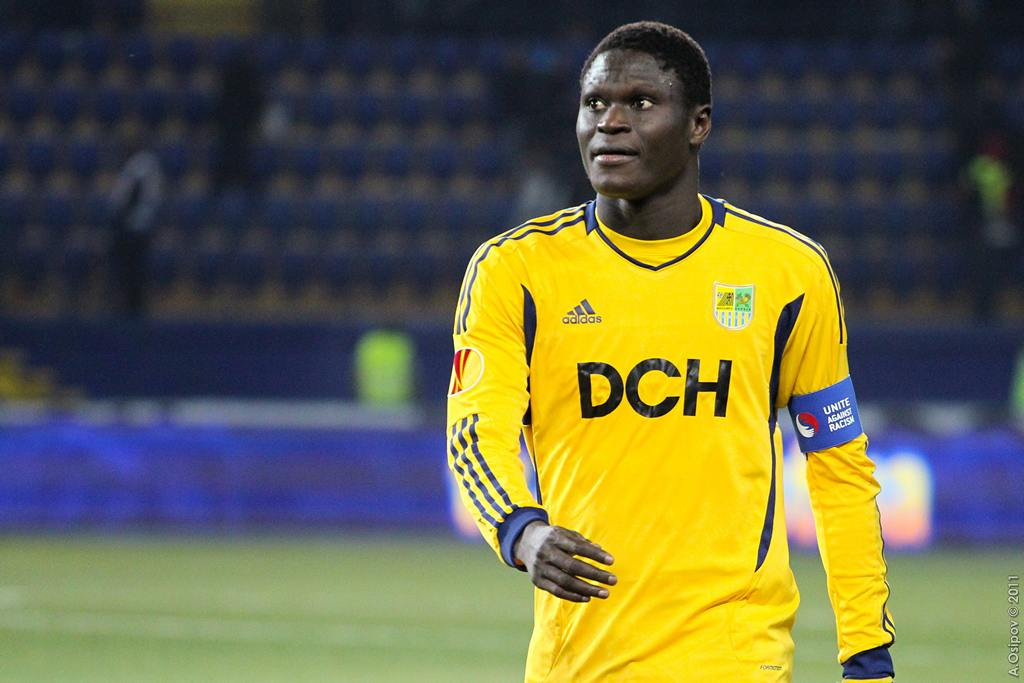
Playing for Metalist against Malmö in 2011 in the UEFA Europa League

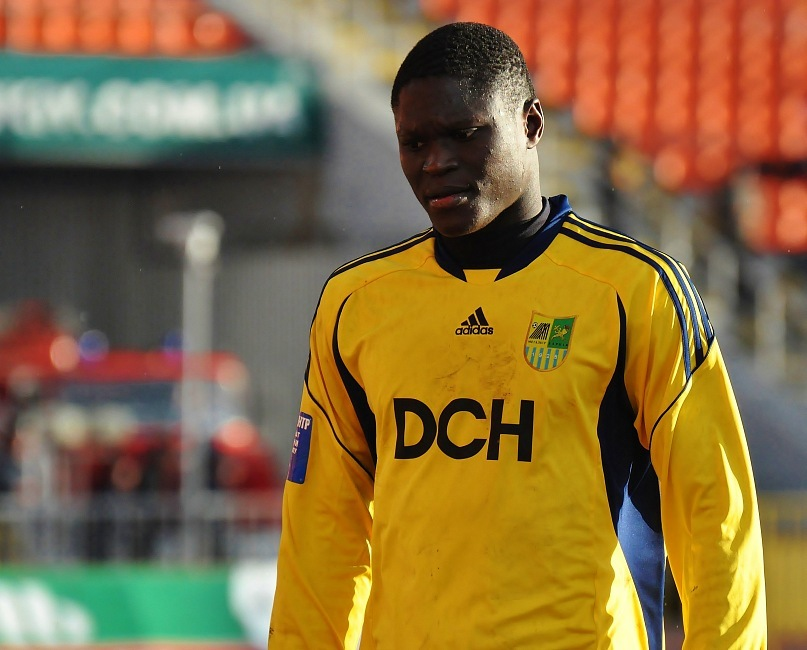
Playing for Metalist

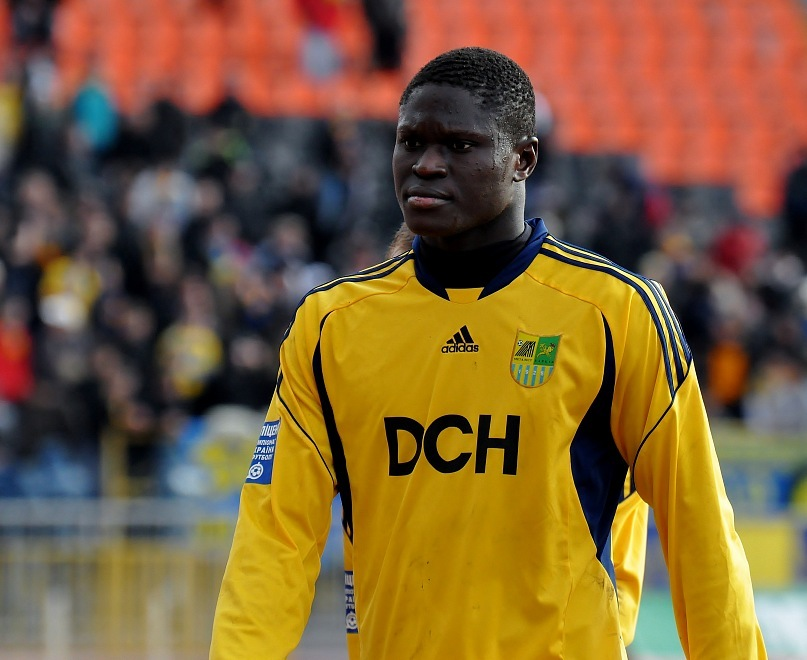
Playing for Metalist

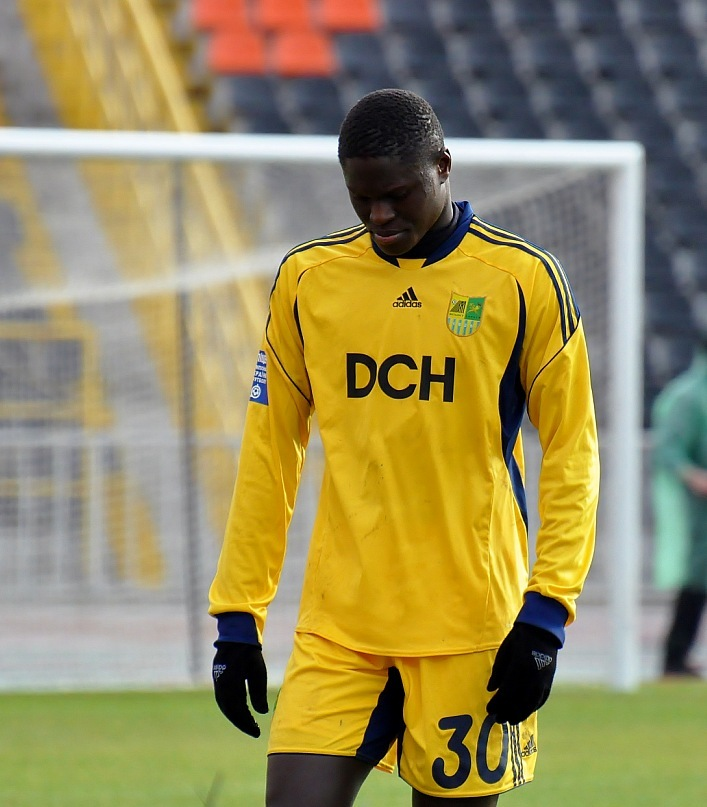
Playing for Metalist

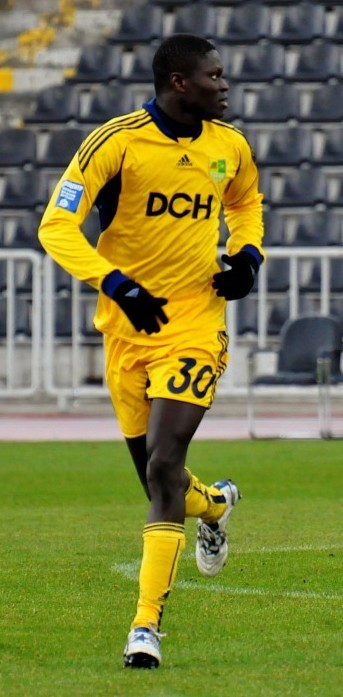
Playing for Metalist

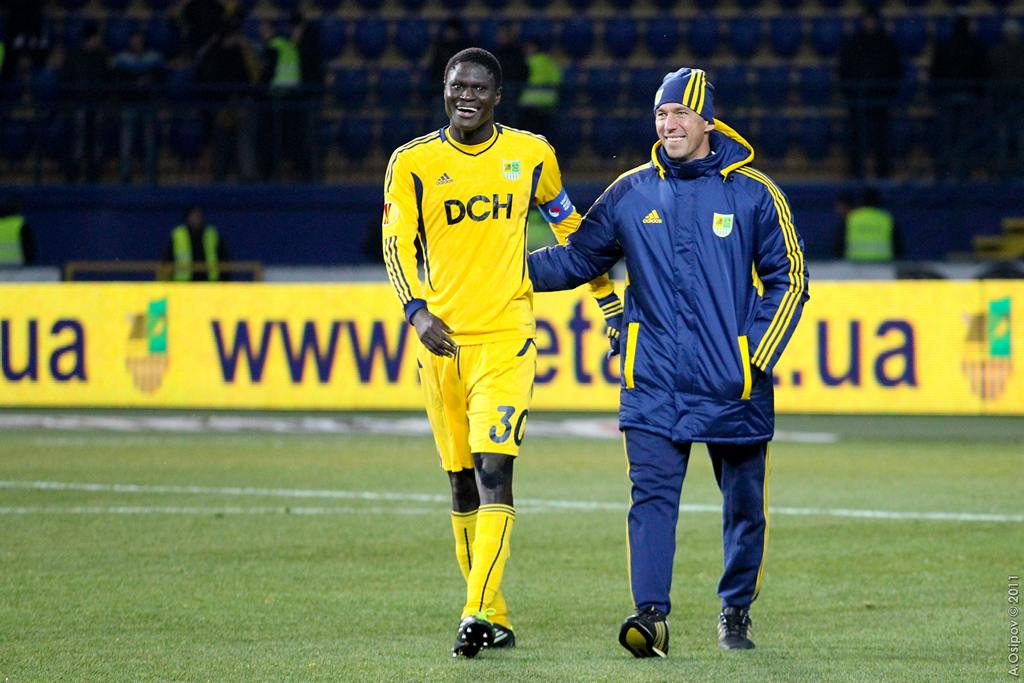
With Metalist goalkeeper Oleksandr Horyainov

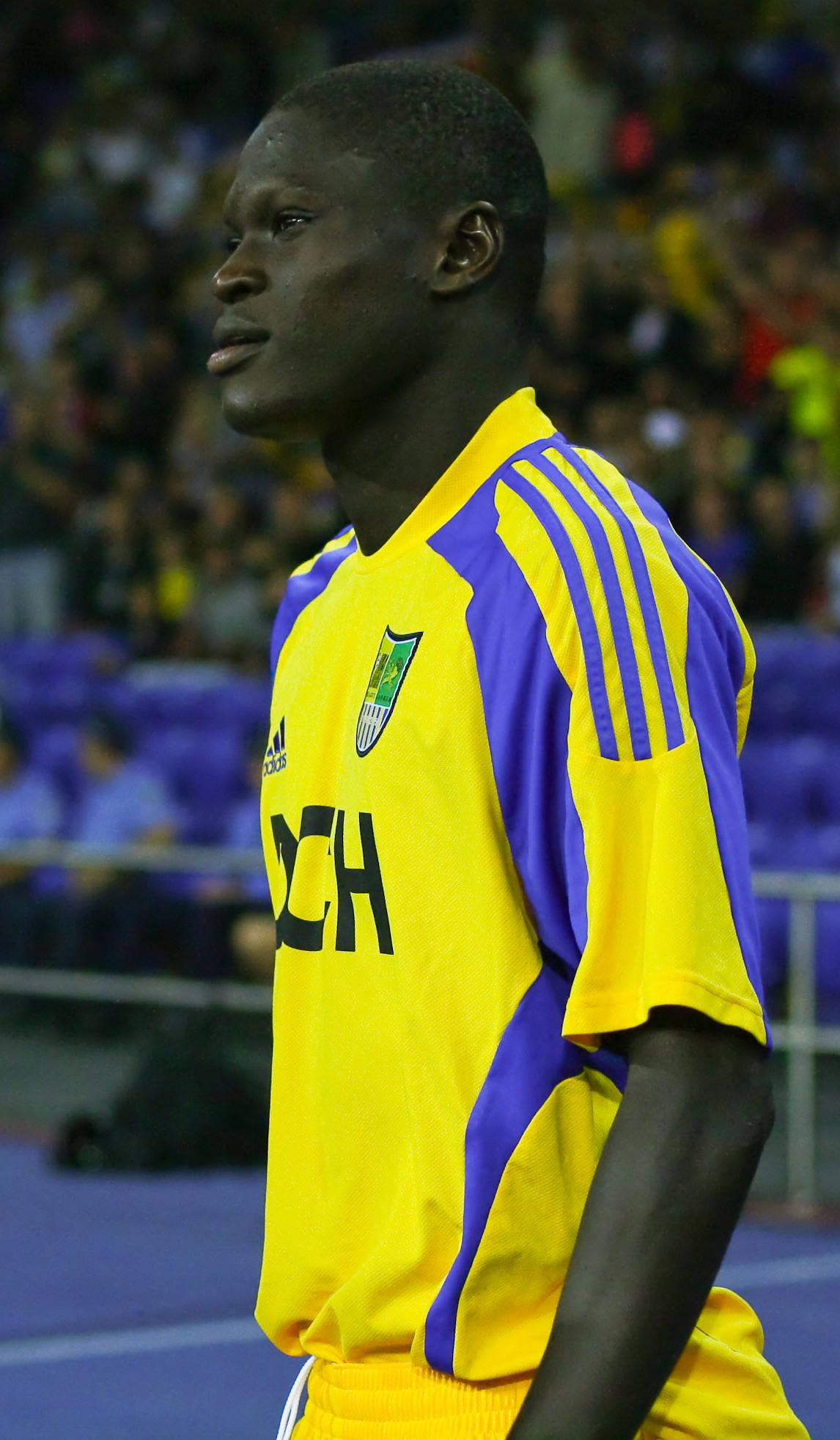
Playing for Metalist in 2009

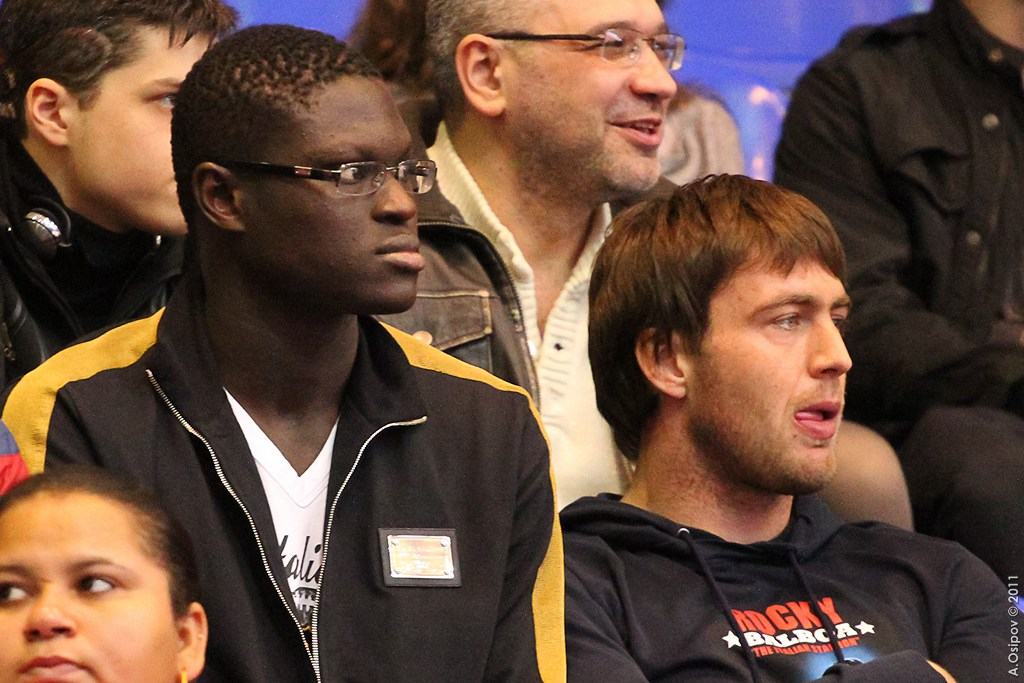
With Metalist goalkeeper Vladimir Dišljenković

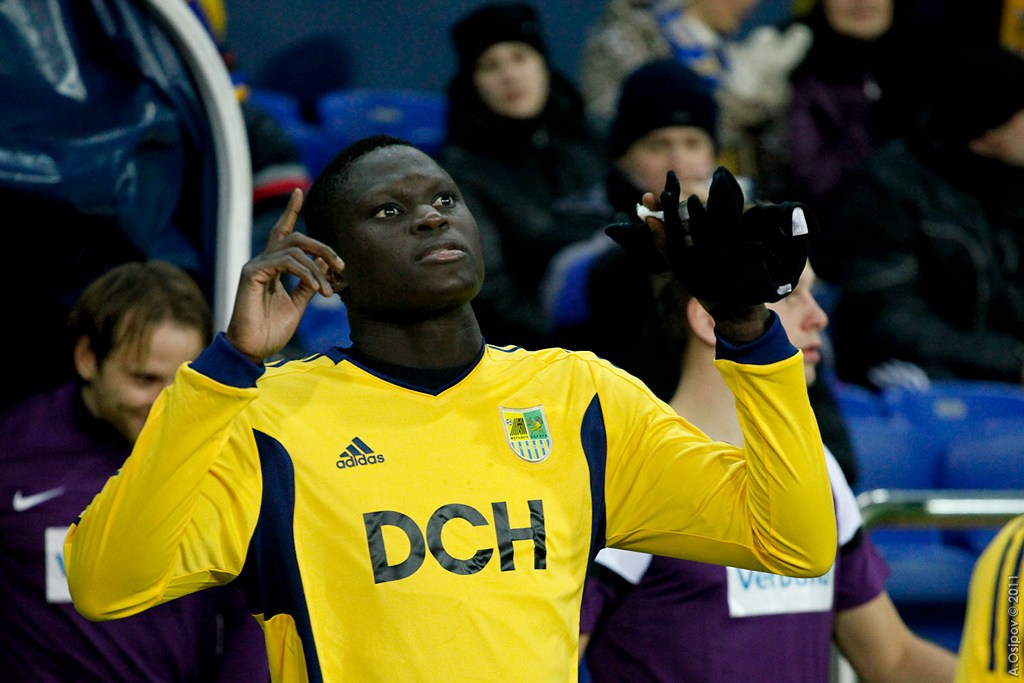
Playing for Metalist against Austria Wien in 2011 in the UEFA Europa League
