= A Painting of Roses =

Um Quadro de Rosas
- Directed by: Miguel Ribeiro
- Written by: Miguel Ribeiro
- Cinematography: Miguel Ribeiro
- Edited by: Miguel Ribeiro
- Release date: 23 April 2004 (Caminhos do Cinema Portugues)
- Country: Portugal
- Language: Portuguese

A Painting of Roses (Portuguese: Um quadro de rosas) is a short documentary by Miguel Ribeiro.

It was produced in 2003 by Bookcase, an independent Portuguese film company.

== Festival and awards ==
- Café das Imagens, Videoteca de Lisboa, 2003
- Mostra de Vídeo Português, Videoteca de Lisboa, 2004
- XI Caminhos do Cinema Português, Coimbra, 2004

Best documentary - video category

- Art Festival at Palazzo Venezia – International Exhibition of Art films and Documentaries, Roma, 2004
- X Festival Internacional de Cinema e Vídeo de Ambiente da Serra da Estrela, Seia, 2004
- FIKE, Festival Internacional de Curtas-Metragens de Évora, 2004
- IMAGO, V Festival Internacional de Cinema e vídeo Jovem, Fundão, 2004
- Pärnu International Documentary and Anthropology Film Festival, Estónia, 2004
- Jovens Criadores 2004, Clube Português de Artes e Ideias, 2004
- 71st MIFED (Mercato internazionale del film e del documentario) , - International Cinema and Multimedia Market, Milão, 2004

Award EMERGING EUROPEAN FILMMAKERS

- NOVIDAD Film Fest, Covilhã, 2004

Best documentary

- IX Festival Internacional de Curtas-metragens de Teerão, 2004
- Jornadas lugar d’arte- mostra de vídeo, cine-teatro Baltazar Dias, Funchal, 2005
- VI Lecce European Film Festival, 2005
- XII Bienal de Jovens Criadores da Europa e do Mediterrâneo, Nápoles, 2005
- V Mostra Audiovisual "El Mes + Corto", Cáceres, Badajoz, Evora e Lisboa, 2006
