= Mangaratiba =

- Municipality
- Município de Mangaratiba
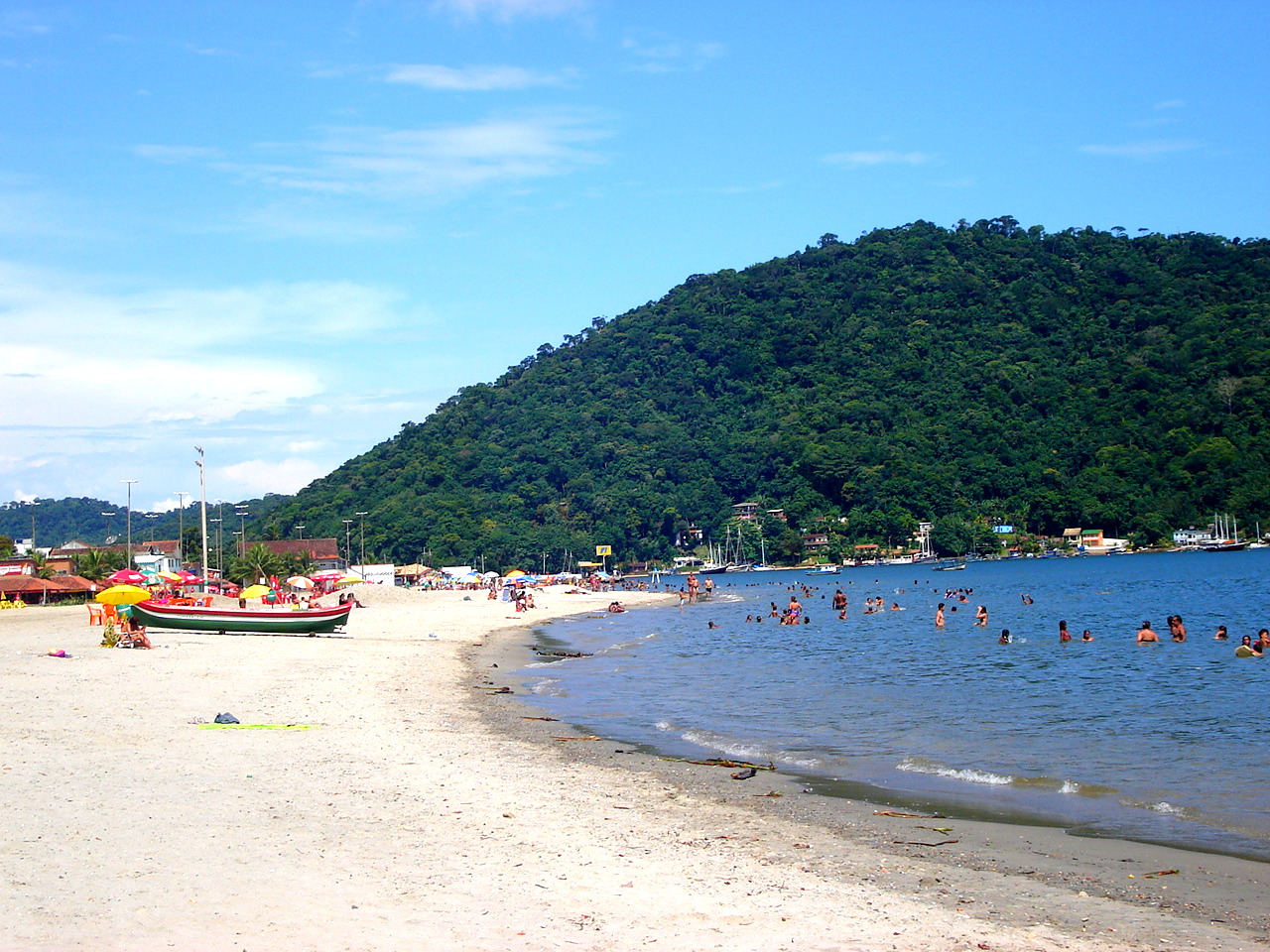
- Itacuruçá

- Flag Coat of arms

- Location of Mangaratiba in the state of Rio de Janeiro

- Location of Mangaratiba in Brazil
- Coordinates: 22°57′36″S 44°02′27″W
- Country: Brazil
- Region: Southeast
- State: Rio de Janeiro

Government
  - Prefeito: Luiz Claudio Ribeiro (REP)

Area
  - Total: 356.408 km^{2} (137.610 sq mi)
- Elevation: 355 m (1,165 ft)

Population (2020)
  - Total: 45,220
- Time zone: UTC−3 (BRT)
- Website: www.mangaratiba.rj.gov.br

Mangaratiba (Portuguese pronunciation: [mɐ̃gaɾɐˈtʃibɐ]) is a municipality located in the Brazilian state of Rio de Janeiro. Its population is 45,220 (2020) and its area is 352 km^{2}.

Part of the Sylvester Stallone film The Expendables was shot in the central part of the city. The pier that is exploded in the film is the pier that the main ferry to Ilha Grande uses as its base of operation.

Many large bulk carriers enter the port of Mangaratiba, fetching heavy loads of iron ore bound for especially European ports. As such, the port of Mangaratiba is one of the largest in Brazil.

== Political crisis ==
The municipality of Mangaratiba has been suffering from what has been described as a "strong political crisis". Many of the recent city's mayors have been arrested during their terms, which at times have triggered supplementary elections at odd years outside of the usual 4-year cycle.

Timeline of Mangaratiba mayors
Name	Took office	Left office	Notes
Aarão de Moura Brito Neto	2005	2010	Aarão Neto and his vice-mayor, Marcelo Tenório da Cruz, were accused of abuse of power, purchase of votes and irregular campaigning on local newspapers. They were removed from office in 2010, and were made ineligible for 4 years after what would be the end of their term. This was clarified in 2018 by the Superior Electoral Court, who specified Aarão's ineligibility lasted from 5 October 2008 through 5 October 2016.
Edison Ramos	7 October 2010	1 March 2011	Acted as interim mayor through the transition. Edison would later also be a fugitive (and subsequently be arrested) along with Vitinho during the 2018 investigations.
Evandro Bertino Jorge ("Evandro Capixaba")	1 March 2011	17 April 2015	After Aarão's removal from office, a supplementary election was held and in 2011 Evandro Jorge was elected with 55.76% of the vote. In 2013, he was reelected and served until 2015. That year, Evandro would be arrested, and later sentenced to 52 years in prison for the embezzlement of R$ 10 million between March 2011 and December 2013.
Ruy Tavares Quintanilha	17 April 2015	2016	Acted as interim mayor through the transition.
Aarão de Moura Brito Neto	2016	14 June 2018	In 2016, Aarão campaigned and was reelected. However, in 2018 the Superior Electoral Court intervened since, as they reasoned, the elections took place on 2 October 2016 and Aarão's ineligibility would only end on 5 October 2016, so he was elected before he could even have campaigned.
Vitor Tenório Santos ("Vitinho")	29 June 2018	31 August 2018	After Aarão was removed from office, the president of the municipal council ("Câmara de Vereadores" of Mangaratiba), Vitinho, assumed as interim mayor. A couple of months after taking office, there was an arrest warrant out for Vitinho, during an investigation on over R$17 million spent by the municipal council on travels. Vitinho was deemed a fugitive of the law until 2021, when he was found and arrested.
Carlos Alberto Ferreira Graçano ("Charles da Locadora")	11 September 2018	20 November 2018	There was some controversy when Charles took office as mayor. He was acting as interim president of the municipal council after Vitinho had become mayor. With Vitinho's disappearance, Charles then took the opportunity to become interim mayor, but the Ministério Público deemed there should be an election to decide the city council's president, who would then become interim mayor.
Alan Campos da Costa ("Alan Bombeiro", lit. 'Alan the Firefighter')	2018	11 February 2022	Elected during a supplementary election in 2018 and reelected in 2020. Alan and his vice-mayor, Alcimar Moreira Carvalho, were removed from office in 2022 and made ineligible for 8 years, accused of abuse of power for hiring almost 2 thousand people as a means to buy votes for the reelection.
