= Oleksandr Horyainov =

Ukrainian footballer and manager

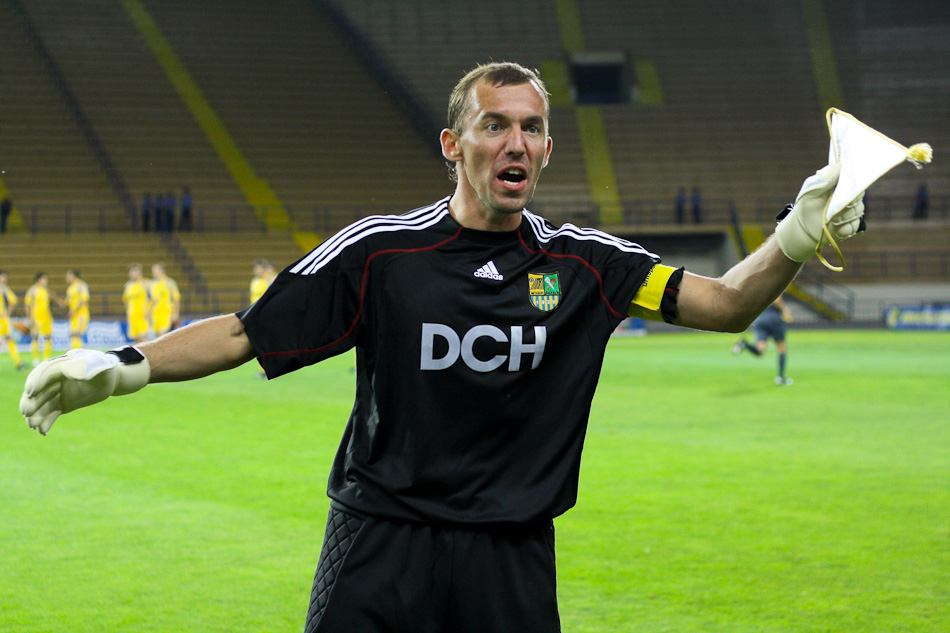
- Horyainov with Metalist Kharkiv in 2009

Personal information
- Full name: Oleksandr Serhiyovich Horyainov
- Date of birth: 29 June 1975 (age 51)
- Place of birth: Kharkiv, Ukrainian SSR, Soviet Union
- Height: 1.84 m (6 ft 1/2 in)
- Position: Goalkeeper

Senior career*
| Years | Team | Apps | (Gls) |
| 1992–1993 | Olimpik Kharkiv | 15 | (0) |
| 1993–1995 | Metalist Kharkiv | 66 | (0) |
| 1993 | → Avanhard Merefa (loan) | 2 | (0) |
| 1995–1997 | CSKA Kyiv | 11 | (0) |
| 1996–1997 | → CSKA-2 Kyiv (loan) | 3 | (0) |
| 1997–2003 | Metalist Kharkiv | 176 | (0) |
| 1998–2002 | → Metalist-2 Kharkiv | 8 | (0) |
| 2003–2005 | Kryvbas Kryvyi Rih | 49 | (0) |
| 2005–2016 | Metalist Kharkiv | 186 | (0) |
| 2016–2017 | Metalist 1925 Kharkiv | 0 | (0) |
| Total | | 516 | (0) |

International career
| 1996 | Ukraine U-21 | 1 | (0) |
| 2010–2013 | Ukraine | 2 | (0) |

Managerial career
- 2016–2017: Metalist 1925 Kharkiv (player/assistant)
- 2017–2018: Metalist 1925 Kharkiv (goalkeeper coach)
- 2018: Metalist 1925 Kharkiv (caretaker)
- 2018–2019: Metalist 1925 Kharkiv
- * Club domestic league appearances and goals

Oleksandr Serhiyovich Horyainov (Ukrainian: Олександр Сергійович Горяїнов; born 29 June 1975) is a retired Ukrainian professional football goalkeeper and manager.

In 1996 he debuted for the Ukraine youth team. However it was not until 2010 when Horyainov finally debuted for the senior team. That day he became the oldest debutant for the senior team, surpassing the record set by Oleksandr Horshkov.

== Career statistics ==
| Club | Season | League | | Cup | | Europe | | Total | |
| Club | Season | Apps | Goals | Apps | Goals | Apps | Goals | Apps | Goals |
|---|---|---|---|---|---|---|---|---|---|
| Olympik | 1992–93 | 15 | −25 | 0 | 0 | 0 | 0 | 15 | −25 |
| Avanhard M | 1993–94 | 1 | −2 | 0 | 0 | 0 | 0 | 1 | −2 |
| Metalist | 1993–94 | 11 | −18 | 0 | 0 | 0 | 0 | 11 | −18 |
| Metalist | 1994–95 | 37 | −36 | 1 | −4 | 0 | 0 | 38 | −40 |
| Metalist | 1995–96 | 18 | −18 | 1 | −3 | 0 | 0 | 19 | −21 |
| CSKA-Borysfen | 1995–96 | 3 | −2 | 0 | 0 | 0 | 0 | 3 | −2 |
| CSKA-2 | 1996–97 | 3 | −1 | 0 | 0 | 0 | 0 | 3 | −1 |
| CSKA | 1996–97 | 8 | −9 | 3 | −3 | 0 | 0 | 11 | −12 |
| Metalist | 1997–98 | 41 | −27 | 3 | −6 | 0 | 0 | 44 | −33 |
| Metalist | 1998–99 | 26 | −23 | 4 | −7 | 0 | 0 | 30 | −28 |
| Metalist | 1999–00 | 30 | −38 | 1 | −2 | 0 | 0 | 31 | −40 |
| Metalist | 2000–01 | 25 | −35 | 2 | −3 | 0 | 0 | 27 | −38 |
| Metalist | 2001–02 | 26 | −36 | 6 | −7 | 0 | 0 | 32 | −43 |
| Metalist | 2002–03 | 28 | −37 | 1 | 0 | 0 | 0 | 29 | −37 |
| Kryvbas | 2003–04 | 24 | −31 | 2 | −7 | 0 | 0 | 26 | −38 |
| Kryvbas | 2004–05 | 25 | −26 | 6 | −6 | 0 | 0 | 31 | −32 |
| Kryvbas | 2005–06 | 0 | 0 | 1 | 0 | 0 | 0 | 1 | 0 |
| Metalist | 2005–06 | 23 | −29 | 1 | −1 | 0 | 0 | 24 | −30 |
| Metalist | 2006–07 | 29 | −20 | 5 | −6 | 0 | 0 | 34 | −26 |
| Metalist | 2007–08 | 24 | −17 | 0 | 0 | 2 | −4 | 26 | −21 |
| Metalist | 2008–09 | 23 | −19 | 1 | −1 | 10 | −5 | 34 | −26 |
| Metalist | 2009–10 | 26 | −16 | 1 | −1 | 4 | −3 | 31 | −19 |
| Metalist | 2010–11 | 5 | −2 | 0 | 0 | 0 | 0 | 5 | −2 |
| Total for Metalist | | 372 | -371 | 27 | -41 | 16 | -12 | 415 | -424 |
| Career totals | | 451 | -461 | 39 | -57 | 16 | -12 | 506 | -536 |
