= Anatoliy Oprya =

Ukrainian footballer

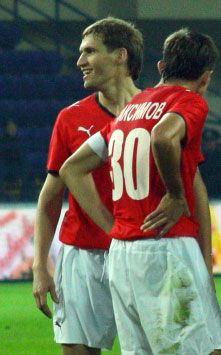

Personal information
- Full name: Anatoliy Oprya
- Date of birth: 25 November 1977 (age 48)
- Place of birth: Illichivsk, Ukrainian SSR
- Height: 1.82 m (6 ft 0 in)
- Position: Midfielder

Youth career
- FC Kryvbas Kryvyi Rih

Senior career*
Years	Team	Apps	(Gls)
1996–1998	Portovyk Illychivsk	33	(1)
1997	→ CSKA-2 Kyiv (loan)	2	(0)
1998–1999	Zhemchuzhina Sochi	10	(0)
1998–1999	→ Zhemchuzhina-2 Sochi	14	(2)
2000–2002	Kristall Smolensk	59	(2)
2002	Rubin Kazan	8	(0)
2003–2004	Chornomorets Odesa	30	(2)
2003–2004	→ Chornomorets-2 Odesa	5	(1)
2004	Metalist Kharkiv	15	(0)
2005	Arsenal Kharkiv	12	(1)
2005–2006	FC Kharkiv	40	(0)
2007–2009	Kryvbas Kryvyi Rih	67	(4)
2010–2011	Dniester Ovidiopol	22	(4)
2011–2013	FC Odesa	48	(5)
2013–2020	Balkany Zorya	148	(9)
- * Club domestic league appearances and goals

Anatoliy Aleksandrovich Oprya (Russian: Анатолий Александрович Опря; born 25 November 1977) is a Ukrainian former professional football midfielder.

== Career ==
Oprya started his career in Ukrainian club FC Portovyk Illychivsk; later played in the Russian League with lower-level clubs Sochi and Kristall Smolensk until spotted by Rubin Kazan. He joined Kryvbas during the summer 2007 transfer season from FC Kharkiv.

In the Ukrainian Premier League, Oprya played for Chornomorets Odesa and FC Kharkiv before moving to Kryvbas in July 2007. As of 1 January 2008, Oprya played 117 games and scored 6 goals in the Ukrainian Premier League.
