= Miguel Ribeiro =

Portuguese screenwriter and filmmaker (born 1974)

Miguel Ribeiro (born in Sintra, Portugal, 1974) is a Portuguese screenwriter and filmmaker.

== Studies ==
Ribeiro graduated in Political Science from Lisbon's Universidade Lusófona de Humanidades e Tecnologias in 1999. He went on to take film studies at New York Film Academy in 2002, and in 2003 returned to Portugal to take a documentary filmmaking course at the Videoteca Municipal de Lisboa . In 2005 he completed post-graduate studies at the Faculdade de Direito of the Universidade de Coimbra.

He attended Robert McKee's "Story Seminar" in 2008 and Linda Seger's writing workshop.

He lives and works in Sintra.

== Filmography ==
- Um quadro de rosas, documentário, 2003
- Interrogatório legal, curta-metragem, 2003
- Aquecimento, documentário, 2004
- Making a Man, documentário, 2007
- Poesia de segunda categoria, curta-metragem em produção, 2010
