= Oleksandr Rykun =

Ukrainian footballer

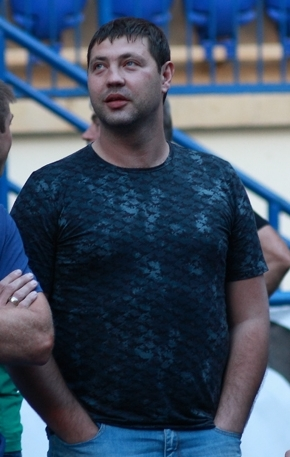

Personal information
- Full name: Oleksandr Valeriyovych Rykun
- Date of birth: 6 May 1978 (age 48)
- Place of birth: Dnipropetrovsk, Soviet Union (now Dnipro, Ukraine)
- Height: 1.87 m (6 ft 2 in)
- Position: Midfielder

Team information
- Current team: Metalist Kharkiv (scout)

Senior career*
Years	Team	Apps	(Gls)
1995–1997	Metalurh Novomoskovsk	37	(7)
1998	Dnipro Dnipropetrovsk	24	(1)
1998	→ Dnipro-2 Dnipropetrovsk	3	(0)
1999–2003	Illichivets Mariupol	114	(29)
2001	→ Illichivets-2 Mariupol	3	(1)
2003–2006	Dnipro Dnipropetrovsk	71	(10)
2006–2010	Metalist Kharkiv	91	(9)
2010	Vorskla Poltava	3	(0)

International career
2002–2006	Ukraine	8	(0)

Managerial career
- 2011–2016: Metalist Kharkiv (scout)
- 2020–: Metalist Kharkiv (scout)
- * Club domestic league appearances and goals

Oleksandr Rykun (Ukrainian: Олександр Валерійович Рикун; born 6 May 1978) is a Ukrainian former footballer who played as a midfielder and current scout at Metalist Kharkiv.

His son Anton is also a player, and a midfielder for FC Dnipro.

== Career ==
Rykun started his career for FC Metalurh Novomoskovsk in 1995. He played there until 1997 when he transferred to Dnipro in 1997. In 1998, he transferred to FC Metalurh Mariupol where he played until 2003. He then transferred back to Dnipro. He debuted in the Vyscha Liha on 17 March 1998 against FC Chornomorets Odesa. The best player of Ukrainian Premier League 2003-04.

== Statistics ==
- Rykun played 71 matches for Dnipro and scored 10 goals.
- He played 114 matches for Mariupol and scored 29 goals.
- He played 8 matches for the Ukraine national football team.
