= Rúben Ribeiro =

Rúben Ribeiro may refer to:

- Ruben Ribeiro (equestrian) (1911-1986), Brazilian equestrian
- Rúben Ribeiro (footballer, born 1987), Portuguese footballer who plays as a midfielder
- Rúben Ribeiro (footballer, born 1995), Portuguese footballer who plays as a leftback
