= Serhiy Seleznyov =

Ukrainian footballer (born 1975)

Personal information
- Full name: Serhiy Anatoliyovych Seleznyov
- Date of birth: 17 February 1975 (age 51)
- Place of birth: Kremenchuk, Ukrainian SSR
- Height: 1.87 m (6 ft 1 1/2 in)
- Positions: Defender; midfielder

Youth career
- KhGVUFK-1 Kharkiv

Senior career*
Years	Team	Apps	(Gls)
1992–1993	FC Olympik Kharkiv	30	(2)
1993–1995	FC Metalist Kharkiv	53	(4)
1996	FC CSKA-Borysfen Kyiv	1	(0)
1996–2000	FC CSKA Kyiv	55	(5)
1997–2000	→ FC CSKA-2 Kyiv (loans)	76	(4)
2001	FC Kryvbas Kryvyi Rih	12	(0)
2001	FC Torpedo-ZIL Moscow	4	(0)
2002	FK Liepājas Metalurgs	5	(0)
2002–2003	FC Oleksandriya	17	(1)
2003–2005	FC Metalist Kharkiv	58	(13)
2005	FC Kharkiv	0	(0)
2006	FC Zakarpattia Uzhhorod	10	(1)
2006–2007	Simurq PIK	18	(3)
2007–2009	FC Dnipro Cherkasy	60	(5)
- * Club domestic league appearances and goals

Serhiy Anatoliyovych Seleznyov (Ukrainian: Сергій Анатолійович Селезньов; born 17 February 1975 in Kremenchuk) is a former Ukrainian football player.

== Honours ==
CSKA Kyiv

- Ukrainian Cup finalist: 2000–01

Liepājas Metalurgs

- Latvian Higher League bronze: 2002
