= Luiz Claudio Ribeiro =

Brazilian politician (born 1988)

Mayor of Mangaratiba
- Incumbent
- Assumed office 1 January 2025
- Preceded by: Alan Bombeiro

Personal details
- Born: 23 January 1988 (age 38)
- Party: Republicans (since 2024)

Luiz Claudio Ribeiro (born 23 January 1988) is a Brazilian politician serving as mayor of Mangaratiba since 2025. From 2023 to 2024, he was a member of the Legislative Assembly of Rio de Janeiro.
