= Jader (footballer, born 1984) =

Brazilian footballer

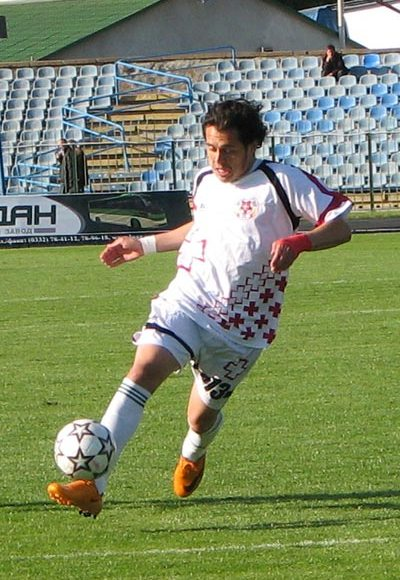

Personal information
- Full name: Jader da Silva Brazeiro
- Date of birth: 21 February 1984 (age 42)
- Place of birth: Porto Alegre, Brazil
- Height: 1.77 m (5 ft 10 in)
- Position: Midfielder

Team information
- Current team: Metalist Kharkiv (scout)

Senior career*
Years	Team	Apps	(Gls)
2003	Pelotas		
2004	Arsenal Kharkiv	28	(5)
2005–2007	Metalist Kharkiv	5	(0)
2007–2008	Volyn Lutsk	37	(9)
2010–2011	Naft Tehran	0	(0)

Managerial career
- 2010–2014: Metalist Kharkiv (scout)
- 2021–: Metalist Kharkiv (scout)
- * Club domestic league appearances and goals

Jader da Silva Brazeiro (born 21 February 1984), commonly known as Jader, is a Brazilian former professional footballer and current scout of Metalist Kharkiv.
