= Seweryn Gancarczyk =

Polish footballer (born 1981)

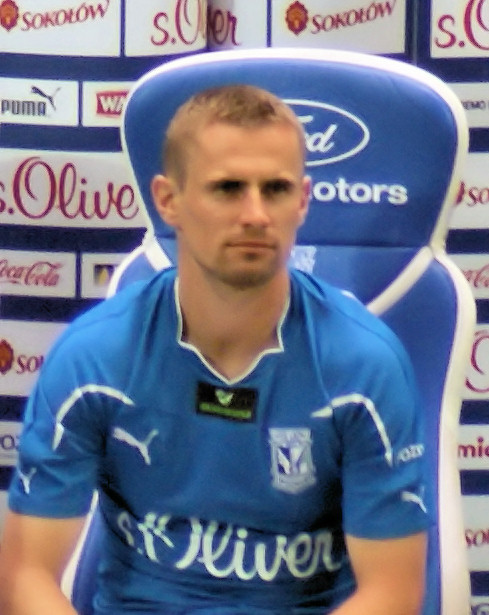
- Gancarczyk with Lech Poznań in 2010

Personal information
- Full name: Seweryn Daniel Gancarczyk
- Date of birth: 22 November 1981 (age 44)
- Place of birth: Dębica, Poland
- Height: 1.83 m (6 ft 0 in)
- Position: Left-back

Youth career
- 1999: Podkarpacie Pustynia

Senior career*
Years	Team	Apps	(Gls)
1999–2003	Hetman Zamość		
2003–2005	Arsenal Kyiv	18	(1)
2004	→ Volyn Lutsk (loan)	19	(0)
2006–2009	Metalist Kharkiv	85	(6)
2009–2011	Lech Poznań	32	(0)
2012	ŁKS Łódź	6	(0)
2012–2015	Górnik Zabrze	62	(1)
2015–2017	GKS Tychy	40	(0)
2018–2019	Rozwój Katowice	37	(1)
2019–2022	Podlesianka Katowice	42	(19)
Total		341	(20)

International career
2006–2009	Poland	7	(0)

Managerial career
- 2023: Unia Turza Śląska
- 2025–2026: Górnik Zabrze II
- * Club domestic league appearances and goals

Seweryn Daniel Gancarczyk (Polish pronunciation: [sɛˈvɛrɨn ˈdaɲɛl ɡanˈt͡sart͡ʂɨk]; born 22 November 1981) is a Polish professional football manager and former player who played as a left-back. He was most recently in charge of Górnik Zabrze II.

== Club career ==
Gancarczyk started to play football in his early teens, in junior teams of Podkarpacie Pustynia. After several seasons there and after a short spell at second division club Hetman Zamość, Gancarczyk made his way to the capital of Ukraine, Kyiv, where he joined local Arsenal Kyiv. Having also briefly performed for west Ukrainian club Volyn Lutsk, Gancarczyk was transferred to Metalist Kharkiv, where he has remained since, and has reached a position of vice-captain at the club.

In 2007, he was voted the best left-back in Ukraine.

During the winter of 2008, Gancarczyk had a try-out with Scottish club Celtic, however due to an injury, he was unable to compete and so returned to Metalist.

In January 2018, Gancarczyk joined Rozwój Katowice. He played for the club until the summer 2019, when he joined Podlesianka Katowice.

== International career ==
Debuting for his country in 2006 in a 0–1 loss against Lithuania, the defender was named to the 23-men squad for the 2006 FIFA World Cup in Germany.

On 14 October 2009, during Poland's last game of the 2010 FIFA World Cup qualifiers against Slovakia, Gancarczyk scored an own goal in the 3rd minute of the game, condemning Poland to a 1–0 defeat and enabling Slovakia to qualify for the World Cup.

== Coaching career ==
While still playing for Podlesianka, Gancarczyk began coaching youth teams of Rozwój Katowice. On 7 June 2022, he joined I liga club Górnik Łęczna's staff as an assistant under Marcin Prasoł. He left the club on 25 February 2023 along with Prasoł.

In April 2023, he took charge of IV liga Silesia club Unia Turza Śląska until the end of the season, replacing the outgoing Ryszard Wieczorek who joined the club only the month prior. Gancarczyk led the club to winning both their group and the promotion play-offs. His contract was not extended, and he was replaced by returning Marek Hanzel, who initially left the club in late February for health reasons.

On 17 January 2024, Gancarczyk was hired as an assistant coach at another second division side Zagłębie Sosnowiec, where he worked under managers Alyaksandr Khatskevich and Marek Saganowski. He terminated his contract by mutual consent on 12 June that year.

On 7 August 2024, Gancarczyk returned to Górnik Zabrze to take up the role of an assistant for their reserve and under-17 teams. On 7 January 2025, he was promoted to the role of Górnik II's head coach. On 15 April 2025, following the appointment of Piotr Gierczak as manager of Górnik's senior team, Gancarczyk joined his staff as an assistant.

== Career statistics ==
=== International ===
Appearances and goals by national team and year
National team	Year	Apps	Goals
Poland
Poland	2006	3	0
Poland	2009	4	0
Total		7	0

== Managerial statistics ==
As of match played 9 June 2026

Managerial record by team and tenure
Team	From	To	Record							
Team	From	To	G	W	D	L	GF	GA	GD	Win %
Unia Turza Śląska	18 April 2023	30 June 2023	14	10	3	1	36	15	+21	71.43
Górnik Zabrze II	7 January 2025	16 June 2026	58	31	10	17	136	66	+70	53.45
Career total			72	41	13	18	172	83	+89	56.94

== Honours ==
=== Player ===
Lech Poznań

- Ekstraklasa: 2009–10

Podlesianka Katowice

- Regional league Katowice IV: 2020–21

=== Manager ===
Unia Turza Śląska

- IV liga Silesia II: 2022–23

Górnik Zabrze

- Polish Cup (Silesia regionals): 2025–26
- Polish Cup (Zabrze regionals): 2024–25, 2025–26
