= Serhiy Zakarlyuka =

Ukrainian footballer and manager

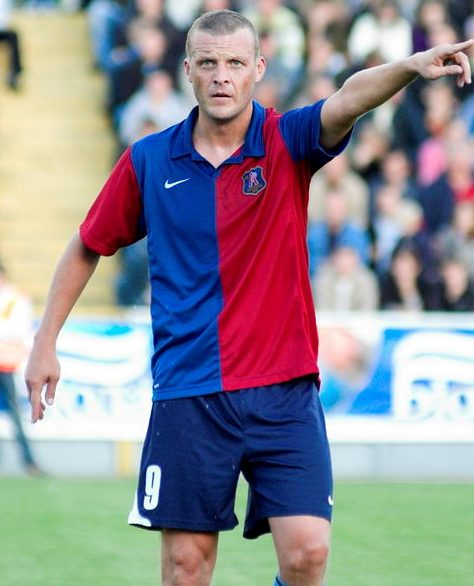

Personal information
- Full name: Serhiy Volodymyrovych Zakarlyuka
- Date of birth: 17 August 1976
- Place of birth: Nikopol, Ukrainian SSR, Soviet Union
- Date of death: 6 October 2014 (aged 38)
- Place of death: near Poltava, Ukraine
- Height: 1.85 m (6 ft 1 in)
- Position: Attacking midfielder

Senior career*
Years	Team	Apps	(Gls)
1993–1994	Dnipro Dnipropetrovsk	3	(0)
1994–1996	Metalurh Nikopol	41	(6)
1996–2001	CSKA / Arsenal Kyiv	135	(30)
1996–2001	→ CSKA-2 Kyiv	31	(7)
2002–2003	Metalurh Donetsk	40	(11)
2002	→ Metalurh-2 Donetsk	1	(0)
2003	Shakhtar Donetsk	4	(0)
2003	→ Shakhtar-2 Donetsk	1	(0)
2004–2005	Illichivets Mariupol	40	(14)
2006	Metalurh Donetsk	22	(2)
2006–2011	Arsenal Kyiv	101	(17)
2011	Vorskla Poltava	9	(0)
2012	FC Poltava	6	(0)
Total		433	(87)

International career
2002–2004	Ukraine	9	(0)

Managerial career
- 2013: FC Arsenal Kyiv (caretaker)
- 2013–2014: FC Naftovyk-Ukrnafta Okhtyrka (assistant)
- * Club domestic league appearances and goals

Serhiy Volodymyrovych Zakarlyuka (Ukrainian: Сергій Володимирович Закарлюка; 17 August 1976 – 6 October 2014) was a Ukrainian footballer and football manager.

Zakarlyuka has played for a number of clubs in Ukraine and played for the Ukraine national team on 9 occasions between 2002 and 2004.

== Death ==
On 6 October 2014, Zakarlyuka was killed in a traffic accident 20 km outside Poltava (Velyka Bahachka Raion) which also injured fellow player Ruslan Levyha.
