= Lasha Jakobia =

Georgian footballer

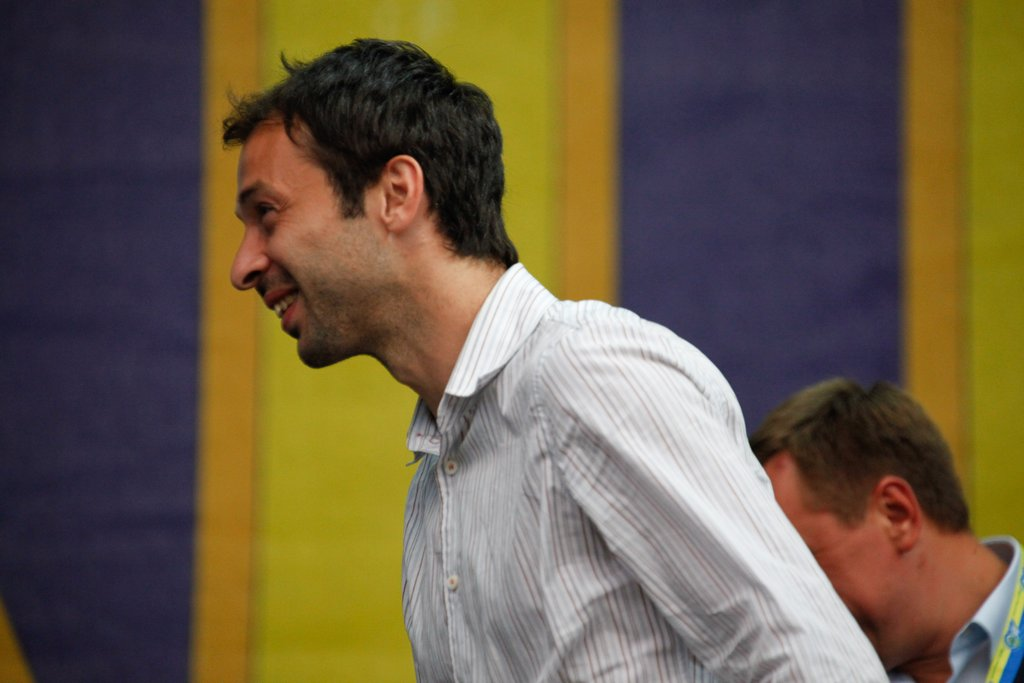

Personal information
- Full name: Lasha Jakobia
- Date of birth: 20 August 1980 (age 46)
- Place of birth: Tbilisi, Georgian SSR, Soviet Union
- Height: 1.80 m (5 ft 11 in)
- Position: Striker

Senior career*
Years	Team	Apps	(Gls)
1998–1999	Standard Liège	2	(0)
1999–2000	→ C.S. Visé (loan)	18	(14)
1999–2000	FC Liège	14	(14)
2000–2001	K.S.C. Eendracht Aalst	3	(1)
2003	AEC Mons	0	(0)
2003	→ FC Rapid București (loan)	0	(0)
2003	Dinamo Tbilisi	1	(0)
2003	Tbilisi	17	(1)
2004	PAS Giannina	7	(4)
2004–2009	Metalist Kharkiv	48	(9)
2006–2007	→ Arsenal Kyiv (loan)	16	(3)
2008	→ Vorskla Poltava (loan)	0	(0)
2009	→ Arsenal Kyiv (loan)	13	(2)
2011	Spartaki-Tskhinvali	10	(2)
2011–2012	Hoverla-Zakarpattia Uzhhorod	24	(10)

International career
2004–2008	Georgia	14	(1)
- * Club domestic league appearances and goals as of 24 March 2012

Lasha Jakobia (Georgian: ლაშა ჯაკობია; born 20 August 1980 in Tbilisi) is a Georgian retired football player.

== Football career ==
=== Belgium ===
Lasha Jakobia started his career at Belgian League club Standard Liège. He then spent his career at lower division for Visé, FC Liège, before joined Eendracht Aalst. He then suffered long-period of injuries, and signed a contract until the end of season for AEC Mons in January 2003. But he then loaned to Rapid București

=== Georgia ===
In April 2003, he returned to his homeland for Dinamo Tbilisi. But in summer 2003, he left for FC Tbilisi, another Georgian club.

=== Greece & Ukraine ===
In January 2004, he moved to Greece for PAS Giannina, signed a two-year contract. But at the end of season, he moved, this time to Metalist Kharkiv, which is the longest club he played, from summer 2004 to winter 2007, except 2006/07 season spent on Arsenal Kiev.

In December 2007, he signed a two-year contract with Vorskla Poltava.

In late 2009 he was disqualified until March 2010 for testing positive for doping. He said that he drank wine laced with methadone to help with his depression caused by several of his relatives dying in a short period of time.

=== International career ===
A former U21 internationals, Jakobia received his first call-up on 18 August 2004 against Moldova. he also in the squad of Georgian side in UEFA Euro 2008 qualifying. He was call-up to the first match in August 2006, but just played three matches in the campaign in September and October 2007.
