= Taras Kiktyov =

Ukrainian footballer

Personal information
- Full name: Taras Yuriyovych Kiktyov
- Date of birth: 7 November 1986
- Place of birth: Ukrainian SSR
- Date of death: 16 July 2012 (aged 25)
- Place of death: Kharkiv, Ukraine
- Height: 1.82 m (5 ft 11 1/2 in)
- Position: Defender

Youth career
- 2000–2001: UFK Kharkiv
- 2001: FC Metalist Kharkiv
- 2001–2003: UFK Kharkiv

Senior career*
Years	Team	Apps	(Gls)
2004–2011	FC Metalist Kharkiv	0	(0)
2004–2005	FC Metalist-2 Kharkiv	15	(0)
2008	→FC Zakarpattia Uzhhorod	11	(0)
2009	→FC Helios Kharkiv	22	(0)
2010–2011	→FC Sumy	1	(0)
2011	FC Dynamo Khmelnytskyi	6	(0)
- * Club domestic league appearances and goals as of 16 July 2012

Taras Kiktyov (Ukrainian: Тарас Юрійович Кіктьов; 7 November 1986 – 16 July 2012) was a Ukrainian professional football player.

== Career ==
Kiktyov made his professional debut in the Ukrainian Second League in 2004 for FC Metalist-2 Kharkiv. After his initial professional stint he played for different Ukrainian First League clubs.

== Death ==
On 16 July 2012 Kiktyov died due to an unspecified heart disease.
