= Anderson Ribeiro =

Brazilian footballer (born 1981)

Personal information
- Full name: Anderson Ribeiro Mendes
- Date of birth: July 2, 1981 (age 45)
- Place of birth: Porto Alegre, Brazil
- Height: 1.84 m (6 ft 1/2 in)
- Position: Striker

Senior career*
Years	Team	Apps	(Gls)
2003–2004	Arsenal Kharkiv	41	(15)
2003–2004	→ Helios Kharkiv (loan)	2	(0)
2004	Metalist Kharkiv	12	(4)
2005	Arsenal Kharkiv	15	(3)
2005–2009	Kharkiv	92	(15)
2009–2010	Tarxien Rainbows	21	(11)
2010–2011	Metalurh Zaporizhzhia	7	(1)
2011–2012	Hamrun Spartans	12	(0)
2012–2013	Hibernians	14	(6)
2013–2014	Naxxar Lions	23	(15)
2014	Zebbug Rangers	3	(3)
2015	Kercem Ajax		
2016	Oratory Youths		

Managerial career
- 2021–2022: Metalist Kharkiv (assistant)
- 2023–2024: Liepāja (assistant)
- 2025–2026: UCSA Tarasivka
- * Club domestic league appearances and goals

Anderson Ribeiro Mendes (born July 2, 1981) is a Brazilian football coach and former player, who was invited to Ukraine by FC Arsenal Kharkiv's chairman Chumak during his vacation trip to Brazil.

Ribeiro quickly became the fans' favourite of nearly all teams in Kharkiv, being the first Brazilian to play for these teams. In the summer of 2009, he joined the Maltese club Tarxien Rainbows FC. In 2010, Ribeiro returned to Ukraine and signed with FC Metalurh Zaporizhya. In 2015, he was playing in Gozo for Kercem Ajax F.C. in the 1st Division. Later, he joined Oratory Youths F.C. in the 1st Division (Gozo).

== Coaching career ==
On 5 July 2025, the Ukrainian First League club UCSA Tarasivka announced they had appointed Ribeiro as new head coach. On 22 September 2026, the Ukrainian First League club UCSA Tarasivka announced about firing of Anderson Ribeiro after a heated argument with one of the club's executive staff members.
