= Serhiy Kostyuk =

Ukrainian footballer

Personal information
- Full name: Serhiy Volodymyrovych Kostyuk
- Date of birth: 5 March 1986 (age 40)
- Place of birth: Kharkiv, Ukrainian SSR
- Height: 1.82 m (5 ft 11 1/2 in)
- Position: Midfielder

Youth career
- 2000–2003: FC Metalist Kharkiv

Senior career*
Years	Team	Apps	(Gls)
2004–2010	FC Metalist Kharkiv	7	(0)
2004–2005	→ FC Metalist-2 Kharkiv	22	(5)
2008	→ FC Volyn Lutsk (loan)	1	(0)
2008	→ FC Zakarpattia Uzhhorod (loan)	14	(0)
2009–2010	→ FC Helios Kharkiv	31	(1)
2010	FC Volyn Lutsk	1	(0)
2011	FC Arsenal Bila Tserkva	32	(1)
2012–2014	FC Helios Kharkiv	53	(1)
2014–2015	FC Metalist Kharkiv	0	(0)
2015	FC Avanhard Kramatorsk	3	(1)
2015–2016	Kolos Zachepylivka (amateurs)	7	(0)
2016	Imereti Khoni	8	(0)
2017	Solli Plyus Kharkiv (amateurs)	2	(0)
- * Club domestic league appearances and goals as of 19 May 2017

Serhiy Kostyuk (Ukrainian: Сергій Володимирович Костюк; born 5 March 1986 in Kharkiv, Ukrainian SSR) is a Ukrainian football midfielder.

Kostyuk is a product of the FC Metalist Kharkiv youth sport school and spent time playing for the Ukrainian teams in the different league's levels. In July 2016, he signed a contract with the Georgian FC Imereti Khoni from the Erovnuli Liga 2.
