= Oleksandr Humenyuk =

Ukrainian footballer (1976–2025)

Personal information
- Full name: Oleksandr Anatoliyovych Humenyuk
- Date of birth: 6 October 1976
- Place of birth: Khmelnytskyi, Ukrainian SSR, USSR
- Date of death: 4 January 2025 (aged 48)
- Height: 1.98 m (6 ft 6 in)
- Position: Goalkeeper

Youth career
- –1990: DYuSSh-1 Khmelnytskyi
- 1990–1993: Dynamo Kyiv

Senior career*
Years	Team	Apps	(Gls)
1992–1993	Nord-Am – Podillya	0	(0)
1993–1994	FC Boryspil	10	(0)
1994	CSKA-Borysfen Kyiv	9	(0)
1995–1996	CSKA Kyiv	31	(0)
1996	CSKA-2 Kyiv	4	(0)
1996	Dnipro Dnipropetrovsk	1	(0)
1997	Metalurh Novomoskovsk	1	(0)
1997–1998	Kremin Kremenchuk	13	(0)
1998	Dnipro-2 Dnipropetrovsk	2	(0)
1998	Chernomorets Novorossiysk	1	(0)
1998–1999	FC Cherkasy	18	(0)
2000–2002	Chornomorets Odesa	42	(0)
2000–2002	→ Chornomorets-2 Odesa (loans)	11	(0)
2003	Volyn Lutsk	24	(0)
2004	Ikva Mlyniv	1	(0)
2004–2005	Volyn Lutsk	24	(0)
2005–2007	Metalist Kharkiv	7	(0)
2007	Stal Dniprodzerzhynsk	4	(0)
2007–2008	Podillya Khmelnytskyi	7	(0)
2008–2009	Krymteplytsia Molodizhne	2	(0)

Managerial career
- 2008: Krymteplytsia Molodizhne (GK coach)
- 2011: Dynamo Kyiv (academy)
- 2011–2012: Zirka Kirovohrad (GK coach)
- 2012: Vorskla Poltava (GK coach)
- 2014: Bukovyna Chernivtsi (GK coach)
- 2014: FC Poltava (conditioning coach)
- 2014–2015: Bukovyna Chernivtsi (GK coach)
- 2015–2016: Bukovyna Chernivtsi
- 2017: Inhulets-2 Petrove
- 2023–2025: Dinaz Vyshhorod
- * Club domestic league appearances and goals

Oleksandr Anatoliyovych Humenyuk (Ukrainian: Олександр Анатолійович Гуменюк; 6 October 1976 – 4 January 2025) was a Ukrainian football coach and player who played as a goalkeeper. He managed FSC Bukovyna Chernivtsi. Humenyuk died on 4 January 2025, at the age of 48.
