= Andriy Shandor =

Ukrainian football referee (born 1966)

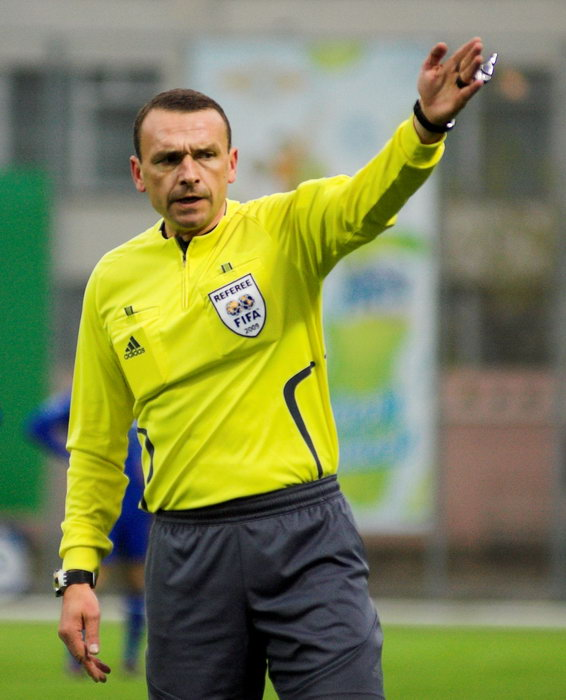
- Full name: Andriy Arpadovych Shandor
- Born: 5 January 1966 (age 60); Lviv, Ukraine SSR
- Other occupation: Dean at the Special Sports School of Olympic Reserve "Karpaty"

Domestic
Years	League	Role
2000-2012	Ukrainian Premier League	Referee

International
Years	League	Role
2002–	FIFA listed	Referee

Andriy Arpadovych Shandor (Ukrainian: Андрій Арпадович Шандор, born 5 January 1966 in Lviv, Ukraine) is a former Ukrainian professional football referee. He has been a full international for FIFA since 2002.
