= Serhiy Shebek =

Ukrainian football referee

- Full name: Serhiy Oleksandrovych Shebek
- Born: 14 June 1960 (age 66); Ukrainian SSR

Domestic
Years	League	Role
1992–2008	Ukrainian Premier League	Referee

International
Years	League	Role
2000-2008	FIFA listed	Referee

Serhiy Shebek (born 14 June 1960, in the Ukrainian SSR of the Soviet Union) is a former Ukrainian football referee. He is a record holder for the most served football games in the Ukrainian Premier League with 226 matches. Shebek retired on December 31, 2008.

== Key games ==
- 2004 Ukrainian Cup Final
