= Syarhey Kuznyatsow =

Belarusian footballer and coach

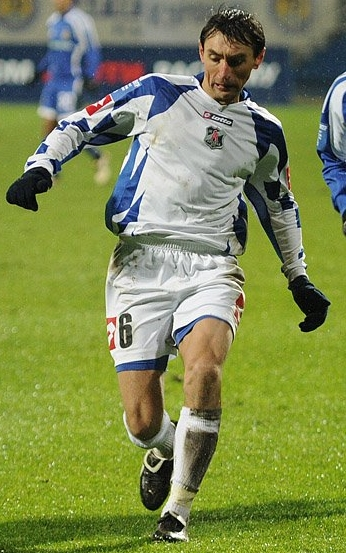

Personal information
- Full name: Syarhey Vyacheslavovich Kuznyatsow
- Date of birth: 3 November 1979 (age 46)
- Place of birth: Minsk, Belarusian SSR
- Height: 1.78 m (5 ft 10 in)
- Position: Midfielder

Youth career
- 1997–1999: Smena Minsk

Senior career*
Years	Team	Apps	(Gls)
1997–1999	Smena-BATE Minsk	31	(4)
1999–2001	BATE Borisov	20	(0)
2000	→ RShVSM-Olympia Minsk	14	(5)
2001	→ Darida Minsk Raion (loan)	9	(1)
2002–2003	Naftan Novopolotsk	50	(10)
2004–2006	Metalist Kharkiv	72	(6)
2004	→ Metalist-2 Kharkiv	1	(0)
2007	Tavriya Simferopol	2	(0)
2007–2009	Arsenal Kyiv	53	(1)
2009	Granit Mikashevichi	13	(1)
2010	Dinamo Brest	20	(0)
2012	Bucha (amateurs)		
2013–2015	Kolos Kovalivka		

International career
2000	Belarus U21	1	(0)

Managerial career
- 2015–2021: Kolos Kovalivka (assistant)
- 2021: Kolos Kovalivka (caretaker)
- 2022–2025: DFK Dainava
- * Club domestic league appearances and goals

Syarhey Kuznyatsow (Belarusian: Сяргей Кузняцоў; Russian: Сергей Кузнецов; born 3 November 1979) is a Belarusian professional football coach and former player.

== Honours ==
- Belarusian Premier League champion: 1999
