= Roman Svitlychnyi =

Ukrainian footballer

Personal information
- Full name: Roman Petrovych Svitlychnyi
- Date of birth: 4 January 1986 (age 40)
- Place of birth: Vovchansk, Kharkiv Oblast, Ukrainian SSR
- Height: 1.80 m (5 ft 11 in)
- Position: Midfielder

Team information
- Current team: Volyn Lutsk
- Number: 14

Youth career
- Youth Sportive School Vovchansk

Senior career*
Years	Team	Apps	(Gls)
2004–2009	Metalist Kharkiv	2	(0)
2004–2005	→ Metalist-2 Kharkiv	17	(4)
2008–2009	→ Krymteplytsia Molodizhne (loan)	14	(0)
2009	Krymteplytsia Molodizhne	11	(1)
2009–2010	Iskra-Stal Rîbniţa	21	(1)
2010–2011	Tytan Armyansk	23	(0)
2012–2015	Naftovyk-Ukrnafta Okhtyrka	79	(5)
2016	Vovchansk (amateurs)	4	(1)
2016	Club Green Streets	?	(?)
2017	Inhulets Petrove	20	(0)
2018–	Volyn Lutsk	0	(0)
- * Club domestic league appearances and goals as of 22 December 2017

Roman Svitlychnyi (Ukrainian: Роман Петрович Світличний; born 4 January 1986) is a Ukrainian football defender who plays for Volyn Lutsk.

== Career ==
Svitlychnyi began playing professional football with FC Metalist Kharkiv's team. He would next spend some years with its club. Last time, 8 July 2010, he signed contract with FC Tytan Armyansk in the Ukrainian First League.

In autumn 2016 he signed contract with Maldivian Club Green Streets, but in February 2017 returned to Ukraine and made a deal with FC Inhulets Petrove.
