= Stal Stadium (Alchevsk) =

Sports venue in Alchevsk, Ukraine

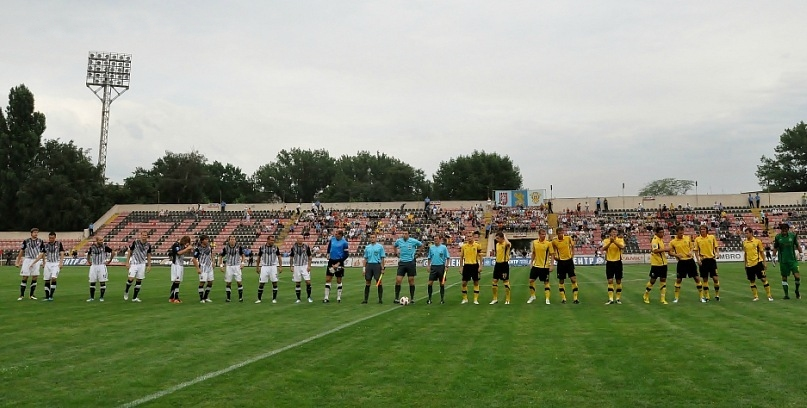
- Interactive map of Stal Stadium
- Location: Alchevsk, Ukraine
- Coordinates: 48°28′27″N 38°47′52″E
- Owner: Stal Alchevsk
- Capacity: 9,200 (football)
- Surface: Grass
- Field size: 105 m × 68 m (344 ft × 223 ft)

Construction
- Opened: 1940

Tenant
- Stal Alchevsk

Stal Stadium (Ukrainian: Стадіон «Сталь»; Russian: стадион «Сталь») is a multi-use stadium in Alchevsk, Ukraine. It was used mostly for football matches, and is the home of FC Stal Alchevsk. The stadium holds 9,200 people, and was built in 1940. The stadium is located in a city park, entrance to which is decorated by an arc. There also located a club's restaurant "Stal". The stadium has an electronic scoreboard.

In June 2013, the stadium was the reason FC Stal Alchevsk refused its promotion to the Ukrainian Premier League. Because at the time did not meet the requirements of the highest Ukrainian division and the club did not want to play in another stadium because it saw "no point in holding matches in another stadium as most fans of Stal won’t see them".

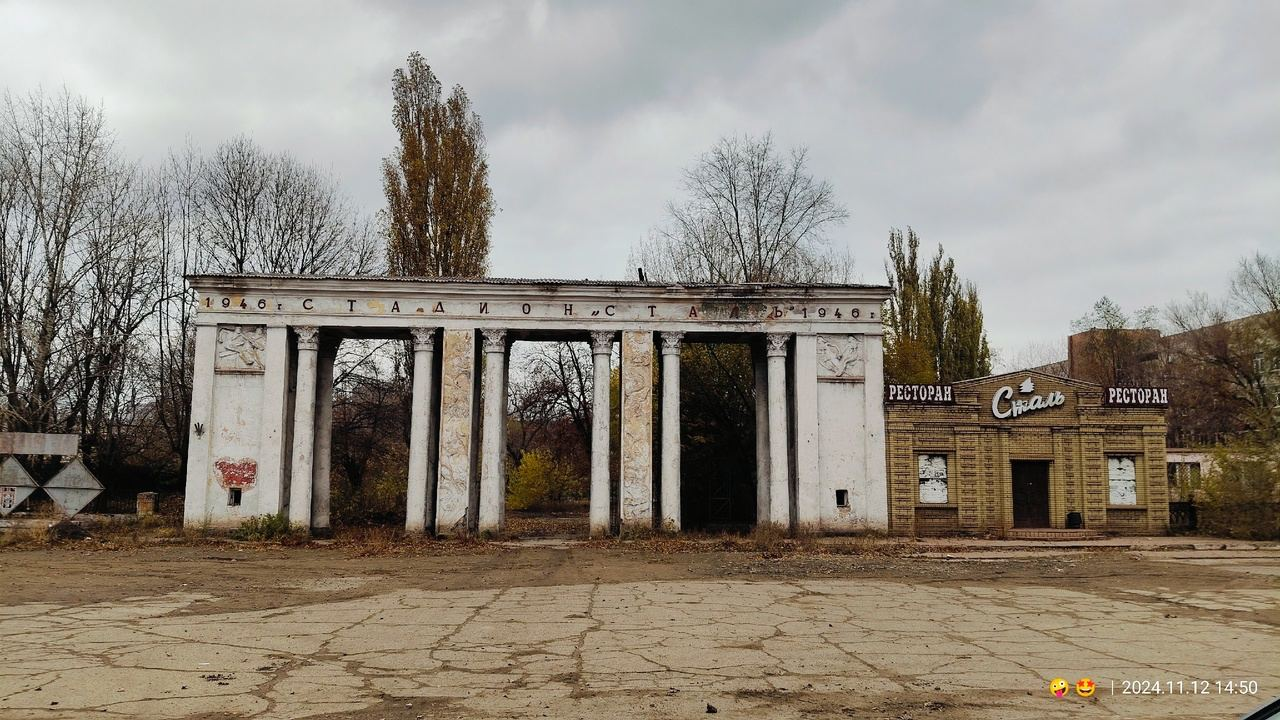
The entrance to the stadium in 2024.

Due to the War in the Donbas, the stadium has not been in use since 2014. FC Stal Alchevsk, the football club that played at the stadium, briefly moved to playing in exile in Poltava Oblast, but was ultimately disbanded in 2015 due to its financial state. Due to this, the state of the stadium has significantly deteriorated. The entrance arch has been damaged. According to reports, the pitch is now entirely uneven, the running track is worn down and overgrown, and the walls are all damaged and covered in graffiti.
