= Oleh Oriekhov =

Ukrainian football referee

Oleh Oryekhov
- Full name: Oleh Borysovych Oryekhov
- Born: 20 August 1967 (age 59); Kyiv, Ukrainian SSR

Domestic
Years	League	Role
2002–2009	Ukrainian Premier League	Referee

International
Years	League	Role
2003-2010	FIFA listed	Referee

Oleh Borysovych Oryekhov (born 20 August 1967) is a former Ukrainian football referee in the Ukrainian Premier League. He also officiated at international matches.
