= Alyaksandr Danilaw =

Belarusian footballer

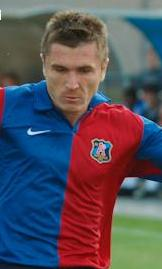

Personal information
- Full name: Alyaksandr Danilaw
- Date of birth: 10 September 1980 (age 46)
- Place of birth: Gomel, Belarusian SSR
- Height: 1.78 m (5 ft 10 in)
- Position: Defender

Senior career*
Years	Team	Apps	(Gls)
1998–2000	Gomel-2	50	(4)
2001	ZLiN Gomel	27	(2)
2002–2004	Gomel	68	(4)
2005–2007	Metalist Kharkiv	83	(3)
2008–2009	Metalurh Donetsk	9	(0)
2009–2011	Arsenal Kyiv	15	(0)
2011	Gomel	6	(0)
2012–2013	Dinamo Minsk	48	(2)
2015	Gomel	24	(0)
2017	Babīte	7	(0)
2018	FC Muzychi (amateur)	8	(0)
2019	Desna Pogreby (amateur)	13	(0)
- * Club domestic league appearances and goals as of 31 December 2019

Alyaksandr Danilaw (born 10 September 1980) is a Belarusian former football defender.

== Honours ==
Gomel

- Belarusian Premier League champion: 2003
- Belarusian Cup champion: 2001–02
