= Ihor Pokydko =

Ukrainian footballer

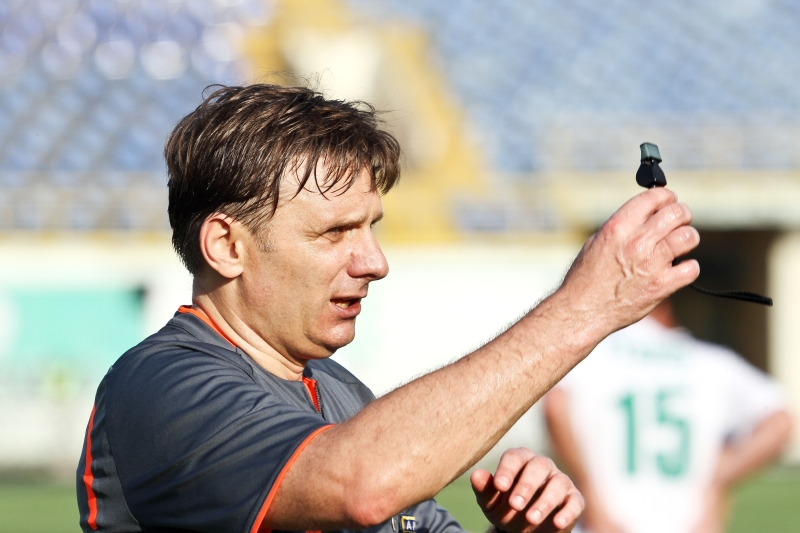

Personal information
- Full name: Ihor Romanovych Pokydko
- Date of birth: 15 February 1965 (age 61)
- Place of birth: Ternopil, Ukrainian SSR
- Height: 1.79 m (5 ft 10 in)
- Position: Defender

Senior career*
Years	Team	Apps	(Gls)
1988–1992	Nyva Ternopil	143	(3)
1992–1993	Veres Rivne	14	(3)
1994	Nyva Ternopil	7	(0)

International career
1992	Ukraine	1	(0)
- * Club domestic league appearances and goals

Ihor Romanovych Pokydko (Ukrainian: Ігор Романович Покидько; born 15 February 1965) is a Ukrainian professional football referee and a former player.

== Club career ==
As a player, he made his professional debut in the Soviet Second League in 1988 for FC Nyva Ternopil. Following the dissolution of the Soviet Union and admission of Nyva to the top tier, in 1992 he debuted in the Vyshcha Liha.

== International career ==
He made his only Ukraine national football team appearance on 27 June 1992 in an away friendly against the United States, a 0–0 away draw.

== Referee career ==
As a referee, he started already in 1993 serving matches of regional competitions. Since 1998 Pokydko was refereeing for professional competitions retiring in 2011.
