= 2012–13 FC Metalist Kharkiv season =

Metalist Kharkiv
2012–13 season
- Chairman: Oleksandr Yaroslavskyi (until December 2012); Serhiy Kurchenko (from December 2012)
- Manager: Myron Markevych
- Stadium: OSC Metalist
- Ukrainian Premier League: 2nd
- Ukrainian Cup: Round of 16
- UEFA Europa League: Round of 32
- Top goalscorer: League: Cleiton Xavier (15); All: Cleiton Xavier (20)
Home colours	Away colours

The 2012–13 season was FC Metalist Kharkiv's 68th season in existence and the club's 9th consecutive season in the top flight of Ukrainian football. In addition to the domestic league, Metalist Kharkiv participated in that season's editions of the Ukrainian Cup and the UEFA Europa League. The season covers the period from 1 July 2012 to 30 June 2013.

== Players ==
=== First team squad ===
Squad at the end of season

Note: Flags indicate national team as defined under FIFA eligibility rules; some limited exceptions apply. Players may hold more than one non-FIFA nationality.

No.	Pos.	Nation	Player
3	DF	(Argentina) ARG	Cristian Villagra
4	DF	(Ukraine) UKR	Andriy Berezovchuk
5	MF	(Ukraine) UKR	Oleh Shelayev
6	DF	(Argentina) ARG	Marco Torsiglieri
7	FW	(Brazil) BRA	Willian
8	MF	(Ukraine) UKR	Edmar
10	MF	(Brazil) BRA	Cleiton Xavier
11	MF	(Argentina) ARG	José Sosa
15	DF	(Brazil) BRA	Fininho
17	DF	(Ukraine) UKR	Serhiy Pshenychnykh
18	FW	(Ukraine) UKR	Dmytro Yeremenko
19	MF	(Argentina) ARG	Juan Manuel Torres
20	DF	(Brazil) BRA	Márcio Azevedo
21	FW	(Argentina) ARG	Jonatan Cristaldo
23	MF	(Argentina) ARG	Sebastián Blanco
25	FW	(Brazil) BRA	Marlos
27	MF	(Ukraine) UKR	Yuriy Chonka
29	GK	(Ukraine) UKR	Oleksandr Horyainov

No.	Pos.	Nation	Player
30	DF	(Senegal) SEN	Papa Gueye
32	MF	(Ukraine) UKR	Oleh Krasnopyorov
33	FW	(Ukraine) UKR	Marko Dević
35	GK	(Ukraine) UKR	Bohdan Shust
50	FW	(Brazil) BRA	Jajá
81	GK	(Ukraine) UKR	Vladimir Dišljenković
99	GK	(Ukraine) UKR	Ihor Shukhovtsev
—	GK	(Ukraine) UKR	Artur Denchuk
—	DF	(Ukraine) UKR	Oleksandr Azatskyi
—	DF	(Ukraine) UKR	Denys Barvinko
—	DF	(Ukraine) UKR	Pavlo Cherevatenko
—	DF	(Ukraine) UKR	Volodymyr Shopin
—	MF	(Ukraine) UKR	Oleksandr Andriyevskyi
—	MF	(Ukraine) UKR	Artem Radchenko
—	MF	(Ukraine) UKR	Yuriy Tkachuk
—	FW	(Ukraine) UKR	Volodymyr Barilko
—	FW	(Ukraine) UKR	Robert Hehedosh
—	FW	(Ukraine) UKR	Serhiy Zahynaylov

=== Left during the season ===
Note: Flags indicate national team as defined under FIFA eligibility rules; some limited exceptions apply. Players may hold more than one non-FIFA nationality.

No.	Pos.	Nation	Player
—	DF	(Serbia) SRB	Milan Obradović (loan to Arsenal Kyiv)
—	MF	(Ukraine) UKR	Andriy Oberemko (loan to Metalurh Zaporizhzhia)
—	MF	(Ukraine) UKR	Pavlo Rebenok (loan to Vorskla Poltava)

No.	Pos.	Nation	Player
—	MF	(Ukraine) UKR	Vyacheslav Sharpar (loan to Arsenal Kyiv)
—	FW	(Brazil) BRA	Taison (to Shakhtar Donetsk)
—	FW	(Ukraine) UKR	Andriy Vorobey (loan to Helios Kharkiv)
