= 2011–12 FC Metalist Kharkiv season =

Metalist Kharkiv
2011–12 season
- Chairman: Oleksandr Yaroslavskyi
- Manager: Myron Markevych
- Stadium: OSC Metalist (main stadium); Dynamo Stadium (matchday 2)
- Ukrainian Premier League: 3rd
- Ukrainian Cup: Round of 16
- UEFA Europa League: Quarter-finals
- Top goalscorer: League: Marko Dević (11); All: Jonatan Cristaldo (18)
| Home colours | Away colours |

The 2011–12 season was FC Metalist Kharkiv's 67th season in existence and the club's 8th consecutive season in the top flight of Ukrainian football. In addition to the domestic league, Metalist Kharkiv participated in that season's editions of the Ukrainian Cup and the UEFA Europa League. The season covers the period from 1 July 2011 to 30 June 2012.

== Players ==
=== First team squad ===
Squad at the end of season

Note: Flags indicate national team as defined under FIFA eligibility rules; some limited exceptions apply. Players may hold more than one non-FIFA nationality.

| No. | Pos. | Nation | Player |
|---|---|---|---|
| 1 | GK | UKR | Maksym Startsev |
| 3 | DF | ARG | Cristian Villagra |
| 4 | DF | UKR | Andriy Berezovchuk |
| 5 | MF | UKR | Oleh Shelayev |
| 6 | DF | ARG | Marco Torsiglieri |
| 7 | MF | UKR | Serhiy Valyayev |
| 8 | MF | UKR | Edmar |
| 9 | FW | UKR | Andriy Vorobey |
| 10 | MF | BRA | Cleiton Xavier |
| 11 | MF | ARG | José Sosa |
| 15 | DF | BRA | Fininho |
| 17 | DF | UKR | Serhiy Pshenychnykh |
| 18 | FW | UKR | Dmytro Yeremenko |
| 19 | MF | ARG | Juan Manuel Torres |
| 21 | FW | ARG | Jonatan Cristaldo |
| 22 | DF | SRB | Milan Obradović |
| 23 | MF | ARG | Sebastián Blanco |
| 25 | FW | BRA | Marlos |

| No. | Pos. | Nation | Player |
|---|---|---|---|
| 27 | MF | UKR | Yuriy Chonka |
| 29 | GK | UKR | Oleksandr Horyainov |
| 30 | DF | SEN | Papa Gueye |
| 33 | FW | UKR | Marko Dević |
| 37 | DF | MDA | Vitalie Bordian |
| 77 | FW | BRA | Taison |
| 81 | GK | UKR | Vladimir Dišljenković |
| — | GK | UKR | Artur Denchuk |
| — | DF | UKR | Oleksandr Azatskyi |
| — | DF | UKR | Denys Barvinko |
| — | DF | UKR | Pavlo Cherevatenko |
| — | DF | UKR | Volodymyr Shopin |
| — | MF | UKR | Oleksandr Andriyevskyi |
| — | MF | UKR | Artem Radchenko |
| — | MF | UKR | Yuriy Tkachuk |
| — | FW | UKR | Volodymyr Barilko |
| — | FW | UKR | Robert Hehedosh |
| — | FW | UKR | Serhiy Zahynaylov |

=== Left during the season ===
Note: Flags indicate national team as defined under FIFA eligibility rules; some limited exceptions apply. Players may hold more than one non-FIFA nationality.

| No. | Pos. | Nation | Player |
|---|---|---|---|
| — | DF | UKR | Oleksandr Romanchuk (loan to Volyn Lutsk) |
| — | DF | SVK | Lukáš Štetina (loan to Tatran Prešov) |

| No. | Pos. | Nation | Player |
|---|---|---|---|
| — | MF | RUS | Sergei Tkachyov (loan to Ural Yekaterinburg) |
| — | FW | UKR | Yevhen Budnik (loan to Vorskla Poltava) |

== Competitions ==
=== Ukrainian Premier League ===
==== League table ====
| Pos | Team | Pld | W | D | L | GF | GA | GD | Pts | Qualification or relegation |
|---|---|---|---|---|---|---|---|---|---|---|
| 1 | Shakhtar Donetsk (C) | 30 | 25 | 4 | 1 | 80 | 18 | +62 | 79 (Note: Between Round 26 and Round 28 Dynamo Kyiv and Shakhtar Donetsk had accumulated the same number of points. With the possibility that both teams could finish the competition on the same number of points, the administration of the Premier League decided on 2 May 2012 before Round 29, that if a Golden Match was to be played to decide the championship winner, the encounter would have taken place on 13 May 2012 in Zaporizhzhia at Slavutych Arena.) | Qualification to Champions League group stage |
| 2 | Dynamo Kyiv | 30 | 23 | 6 | 1 | 56 | 12 | +44 | 75 | Qualification to Champions League third qualifying round |
| 3 | Metalist Kharkiv | 30 | 16 | 11 | 3 | 54 | 32 | +22 | 59 (Note: On 12 August 2010, the Football Federation of Ukraine punished Metalist Kharkiv and Karpaty Lviv for fixing a match in 2008; both teams were handed a fine and deducted nine points each. The FFU then released a statement on 19 October 2010 that the point deductions will be applied for the 2011–12 season. However, Karpaty Lviv have indicated that they will take the matter to the Court of Arbitration for Sport (CAS) at Lausanne. No action had been taken through the season nor of any decision by the league. On 2 August 2013 CAS acknowledged the fact of game fixing between Karpaty and Metalist in 2008. The court did not approve points deduction for both of the clubs, yet suggested to have Metalist stripped of its bronze awards for the 2007–08 Ukrainian Premier League and number of players and staff from both clubs were posed penalties and fines for involvement in the game fixing. On 6 August 2013 UEFA suspended advancement of Metalist Kharkiv in the 2013–14 UEFA Champions League to the playoff round until its final decision on 13 August 2013.) | Qualification to Europa League play-off round (Note: Metalurh Donetsk qualified for the Europa League as losing finalist of the 2011–12 Ukrainian Cup to Champions League-qualified Shakhtar Donetsk. Moreover, Dnipro Dnipropetrovsk and Arsenal Kyiv were moved up a round as the cup winner spot was not used.) |
| 4 | Dnipro Dnipropetrovsk | 30 | 15 | 7 | 8 | 52 | 35 | +17 | 52 | Qualification to Europa League play-off round |
| 5 | Arsenal Kyiv | 30 | 14 | 9 | 7 | 44 | 27 | +17 | 51 | Qualification to Europa League third qualifying round |

Source: uafootball.net.ua
Rules for classification: 1st points; 2nd goal difference; 3rd goals scored; 4th fair play
(C) Champions

==== Results summary ====
| Overall | | | | | | | | Home | | | | | | Away | | | | | |
| Pld | W | D | L | GF | GA | GD | Pts | W | D | L | GF | GA | GD | W | D | L | GF | GA | GD |
|---|---|---|---|---|---|---|---|---|---|---|---|---|---|---|---|---|---|---|---|
| 30 | 16 | 11 | 3 | 54 | 32 | +22 | 59 | 9 | 4 | 2 | 23 | 12 | +11 | 7 | 7 | 1 | 31 | 20 | +11 |

==== Results by round ====
| Round | 1 | 2 | 3 | 4 | 5 | 6 | 7 | 8 | 9 | 10 | 11 | 12 | 13 | 14 | 15 | 16 | 17 | 18 | 19 | 20 | 21 | 22 | 23 | 24 | 25 | 26 | 27 | 28 | 29 | 30 |
|---|---|---|---|---|---|---|---|---|---|---|---|---|---|---|---|---|---|---|---|---|---|---|---|---|---|---|---|---|---|---|
| Ground | A | H | A | A | H | A | H | A | H | A | H | A | H | A | H | H | A | H | H | A | H | A | H | A | H | A | H | A | H | A |
| Result | D | W | D | W | W | D | W | W | D | W | W | W | W | W | D | L | W | W | W | W | W | D | W | L | D | D | D | D | L | D |
| Position | 10 | 5 | 7 | 5 | 3 | 3 | 3 | 3 | 3 | 3 | 3 | 3 | 3 | 2 | 3 | 3 | 3 | 3 | 3 | 3 | 3 | 3 | 3 | 3 | 3 | 3 | 3 | 3 | 3 | 3 |

Updated to match(es) played on 21 May 2011. Source: Results
A = Away; H = Home; W = Win; D = Draw; L = Loss

==== Results ====
| 10 July 2011 1 | Dynamo Kyiv | 1–1 | Metalist Kharkiv | Kyiv |
| 19:30 EEST (UTC+3) | Shevchenko 17' | Report | Cleiton Xavier 3' | Stadium: Valeriy Lobanovskyi Dynamo Stadium; Attendance: 16,800; Referee: Viktor Shvetsov |

| 16 July 2011 2 | Metalist Kharkiv | 3–2 | Zorya Luhansk | Kharkiv |
| 16:00 EEST (UTC+3) | Edmar 3'; Dević 49'; Cleiton Xavier 63' | Report | Madou 34' (pen.); Lipartia 57' | Stadium: Dynamo Stadium; Attendance: 8,450; Referee: Yuriy Vaks |

| 23 July 2011 3 | Tavriya Simferopol | 0–0 | Metalist Kharkiv | Simferopol |
| 19:00 EEST (UTC+3) | | Report | | Stadium: RSC Lokomotyv; Attendance: 12,600; Referee: Yevheniy Aranovskyi |

| 29 July 2011 4 | Volyn Lutsk | 0–3 | Metalist Kharkiv | Lutsk |
| 19:00 EEST (UTC+3) | | Report | Sosa 45'; Cristaldo 66'; Cleiton Xavier 80' | Stadium: Avanhard Stadium; Attendance: 7,500; Referee: Serhiy Lysenchuk |

| 6 August 2011 5 | Metalist Kharkiv | 2–1 | Oleksandriya | Kharkiv |
| 20:00 EEST (UTC+3) | Cristaldo 40'; Cleiton Xavier 77' | Report | Hitchenko 88' | Stadium: OSC Metalist; Attendance: 30,212; Referee: Dmytro Kutakov |

| 13 August 2011 6 | Obolon Kyiv | 3–3 | Metalist Kharkiv | Kyiv |
| 21:00 EEST (UTC+3) | Plastun 10' (pen.); Mandzyuk 58'; Kotenko 67' | Report | Cristaldo 29'; Cleiton Xavier 34'; Plastun 77' (o.g.) | Stadium: Obolon Arena; Attendance: 4,500; Referee: Dmytro Zhukov |

| 21 August 2011 7 | Metalist Kharkiv | 2–0 | Metalurh Donetsk | Kharkiv |
| 19:30 EEST (UTC+3) | Cristaldo 14', 35' | Report | | Stadium: OSC Metalist; Attendance: 19,752; Referee: Serhiy Boyko |

| 28 August 2011 8 | Karpaty Lviv | 1–2 | Metalist Kharkiv | Lviv |
| 20:00 EEST (UTC+3) | Márquez 83' | Report | Cleiton Xavier 31'; Dević 89' | Stadium: Ukraina Stadium; Attendance: 5,800; Referee: Viktor Shvetsov |

| 10 September 2011 9 | Metalist Kharkiv | 0–0 | Arsenal Kyiv | Kharkiv |
| 19:30 EEST (UTC+3) | | Report | | Stadium: OSC Metalist; Attendance: 29,864; Referee: Andriy Shandor |

| 18 September 2011 10 | Kryvbas Kryvyi Rih | 0–1 | Metalist Kharkiv | Kryvyi Rih |
| 17:30 EEST (UTC+3) | | Report | Cristaldo 68' | Stadium: Metalurh Stadium; Attendance: 14,500; Referee: Serhiy Dankovskyi |

| 24 September 2011 11 | Metalist Kharkiv | 1–0 | Dnipro Dnipropetrovsk | Kharkiv |
| 17:30 EEST (UTC+3) | Taison 87' | Report | | Stadium: OSC Metalist; Attendance: 38,656; Referee: Oleksandr Derdo |

| 2 October 2011 12 | Illichivets Mariupol | 0–1 | Metalist Kharkiv | Mariupol |
| 13:30 EEST (UTC+3) | | Report | Edmar 55' | Stadium: Illichivets Stadium; Attendance: 5,300; Referee: Oleh Derevinskyi |

| 15 October 2011 13 | Metalist Kharkiv | 1–0 | Chornomorets Odesa | Kharkiv |
| 19:30 EEST (UTC+3) | Budnik 45+1' | Report | | Stadium: OSC Metalist; Attendance: 28,780; Referee: Yuriy Moseychuk |

| 23 October 2011 14 | Shakhtar Donetsk | 1–2 | Metalist Kharkiv | Donetsk |
| 16:00 EEST (UTC+3) | Mkhitaryan 60' | Report | Villagra 45+2'; Torsiglieri 54' | Stadium: Donbas Arena; Attendance: 45,204; Referee: Serhiy Boyko |

| 29 October 2011 15 | Metalist Kharkiv | 2–2 | Vorskla Poltava | Kharkiv |
| 19:30 EEST (UTC+3) | Cleiton Xavier 18'; Sosa 37' | Report | Bezus 69'; Oberemko 89' | Stadium: OSC Metalist; Attendance: 25,342; Referee: Viktor Shvetsov |

| 6 November 2011 16 | Metalist Kharkiv | 1–2 | Dynamo Kyiv | Kharkiv |
| 19:30 EEST (UTC+3) | Dević 76' | Report | Ideye 8', 35' | Stadium: OSC Metalist; Attendance: 37,803; Referee: Yuriy Vaks |

| 20 November 2011 17 | Zorya Luhansk | 1–5 | Metalist Kharkiv | Donetsk |
| 13:00 EEST (UTC+3) | Lazarovych 33' | Report | Dević 19' (pen.), 47'; Cristaldo 21'; Sosa 80' (pen.); Fininho 90+1' | Stadium: RSC Olimpiyskiy; Attendance: 700; Referee: Andriy Shandor |

| 25 November 2011 18 | Metalist Kharkiv | 2–0 | Tavriya Simferopol | Kharkiv |
| 20:00 EEST (UTC+3) | Dević 15' (pen.); Edmar 90+2' | Report | | Stadium: OSC Metalist; Attendance: 20,106; Referee: Yevheniy Aranovskyi |

| 4 December 2011 19 | Metalist Kharkiv | 3–1 | Volyn Lutsk | Kharkiv |
| 19:30 EEST (UTC+3) | Sosa 82'; Fininho 84'; Taison 90+3' | Report | Pavlov 8' | Stadium: OSC Metalist; Attendance: 17,500; Referee: Vitaliy Romanov |

| 10 December 2011 20 | Oleksandriya | 1–3 | Metalist Kharkiv | Oleksandriya |
| 13:30 EEST (UTC+3) | Ksyonz 25' | Report | Cleiton Xavier 22'; Dević 66', 87' | Stadium: Nika Stadium; Attendance: 6,000; Referee: Yuriy Vaks |

| 3 March 2012 21 | Metalist Kharkiv | 1–0 | Obolon Kyiv | Kharkiv |
| 19:30 EEST (UTC+3) | Pshenychnykh 90+5' | Report | | Stadium: OSC Metalist; Attendance: 25,139; Referee: Yaroslav Kozyk |

| 11 March 2012 22 | Metalurh Donetsk | 1–1 | Metalist Kharkiv | Donetsk |
| 13:30 EEST (UTC+3) | Morozyuk 36' | Report | Dević 45+1' | Stadium: Metalurh Stadium; Attendance: 3,000; Referee: Vitaliy Romanov |

| 19 March 2012 23 | Metalist Kharkiv | 3–1 | Karpaty Lviv | Kharkiv |
| 19:00 EEST (UTC+3) | Cristaldo 31', 64'; Berezovchuk 47' | Report | Fedetskyi 53' | Stadium: OSC Metalist; Attendance: 28,806; Referee: Serhiy Boyko |

| 24 March 2012 24 | Arsenal Kyiv | 4–2 | Metalist Kharkiv | Kyiv |
| 15:30 EEST (UTC+3) | Kovpak 34', 49'; Kobakhidze 84'; Florescu 86' | Report | Blanco 73'; Cleiton Xavier 77' (pen.) | Stadium: Valeriy Lobanovskyi Dynamo Stadium; Attendance: 9,328; Referee: Anatoliy Zhabchenko |

| 1 April 2012 25 | Metalist Kharkiv | 1–1 | Kryvbas Kryvyi Rih | Kharkiv |
| 19:30 EEST (UTC+3) | Marlos 74' | Report | Fedorchuk 18' | Stadium: OSC Metalist; Attendance: 25,086; Referee: Oleksandr Derdo |

| 9 April 2012 26 | Dnipro Dnipropetrovsk | 2–2 | Metalist Kharkiv | Dnipropetrovsk |
| 19:00 EEST (UTC+3) | Matheus 58'; Rotan 85' | Report | Sosa 31'; Dević 59' | Stadium: Dnipro-Arena; Attendance: 30,000; Referee: Yuriy Mozharovskyi |

| 14 April 2012 27 | Metalist Kharkiv | 0–0 | Illichivets Mariupol | Kharkiv |
| 19:30 EEST (UTC+3) | | Report | | Stadium: OSC Metalist; Attendance: 25,814; Referee: Dmytro Kutakov |

| 22 April 2012 28 | Chornomorets Odesa | 3–3 | Metalist Kharkiv | Odesa |
| 17:00 EEST (UTC+3) | Bobko 4', 67'; Vitaliy Balashov 73' (pen.) | Report | Cleiton Xavier 26'; Cristaldo 27'; Edmar 80' | Stadium: Chornomorets Stadium; Attendance: 26,125; Referee: Dmytro Zhukov |

| 2 May 2012 29 | Metalist Kharkiv | 1–2 | Shakhtar Donetsk | Kharkiv |
| 19:00 EEST (UTC+3) | Blanco 11' | Report | Luiz Adriano 36'; Fernandinho 50' | Stadium: OSC Metalist; Attendance: 38,633; Referee: Anatoliy Zhabchenko |

| 10 May 2012 30 | Vorskla Poltava | 2–2 | Metalist Kharkiv | Poltava |
| 16:30 EEST (UTC+3) | Kurilov 8'; Bordian 69' (o.g.) | Report | Dević 23'; Pshenychnykh 25' | Stadium: Oleksiy Butovsky Vorskla Stadium; Attendance: 6,500; Referee: Dmytro Kutakov |

=== Ukrainian Cup ===
| 21 September 2011 Round of 32 | Berehvideyk Berehove | 0–3 | Metalist Kharkiv | Berehove |
| 16:00 EEST (UTC+3) | | Report | Cristaldo 44'; Tkachyov 45+1'; Budnik 74' | Stadium: Druzhba Stadium; Attendance: 5,000; Referee: Andriy Kuzmin |

| 26 October 2011 Round of 16 | Karpaty Lviv | 1–0 | Metalist Kharkiv | Lviv |
| 120:00 EEST (UTC+3) | Milošević 59' | Report | | Stadium: Ukraina Stadium; Attendance: 27,000; Referee: Serhiy Dankovskyi |

=== UEFA Europa League ===
==== Play-off round ====
| 18 August 2011 First leg | Metalist Kharkiv (Ukraine) | 0–0 | (France) Sochaux | Kharkiv |
| 20:30 EEST (UTC+2) | | Report | | Stadium: OSC Metalist; Attendance: 35,886; Referee: (Sweden) Stefan Johannesson |

| 25 August 2011 Second leg | Sochaux (France) | 0–4 (0–4 agg.) | (Ukraine) Metalist Kharkiv | Montbéliard |
| 20:45 CET (UTC+1) | | Report | Sosa 6'; Cristaldo 11', 40'; Taison 51' | Stadium: Stade Auguste-Bonal; Attendance: 8,739; Referee: (Spain) Eduardo Iturralde González |

==== Group stage ====
| Pos | Team | Pld | W | D | L | GF | GA | GD | Pts | Qualification | MK | AZ | AW | MFF |
|---|---|---|---|---|---|---|---|---|---|---|---|---|---|---|
| 1 | (Ukraine) Metalist Kharkiv | 6 | 4 | 2 | 0 | 15 | 6 | +9 | 14 | Advance to knockout phase | — | 1–1 | 4–1 | 3–1 |
| 2 | (Netherlands) AZ | 6 | 1 | 5 | 0 | 10 | 7 | +3 | 8 (Note: Tied on head-to-head results. Overall goal difference was used as the tiebreaker.) | Advance to knockout phase | 1–1 | — | 2–2 | 4–1 |
| 3 | Austria Wien | 6 | 2 | 2 | 2 | 10 | 11 | −1 | 8 | | 1–2 | 2–2 | — | 2–0 |
| 4 | (Sweden) Malmö FF | 6 | 0 | 1 | 5 | 4 | 15 | −11 | 1 | | 1–4 | 0–0 | 1–2 | — |

Source: Soccerway
Notes:

| 15 September 2011 1 | Austria Wien | 1–2 | (Ukraine) Metalist Kharkiv | Vienna |
| 21:05 | Jun 7' | Report | Gueye 56'; Cleiton Xavier 79' (pen.) | Stadium: Generali Arena; Attendance: 9,100; Referee: (England) Mike Dean |

| 29 September 2011 2 | Metalist Kharkiv (Ukraine) | 1–1 | (Netherlands) AZ | Kharkiv |
| 19:00 | Taison 76' | Report | Altidore 26' | Stadium: OSC Metalist; Attendance: 37,122; Referee: (Poland) Marcin Borski |

| 20 October 2011 3 | Malmö FF (Sweden) | 1–4 | (Ukraine) Metalist Kharkiv | Malmö |
| 19:00 | Hamad 22' | Report | Cristaldo 32'; Fininho 45+1'; Edmar 57'; Dević 73' | Stadium: Swedbank Stadion; Attendance: 8,466; Referee: (Turkey) Fırat Aydınus |

| 3 November 2011 4 | Metalist Kharkiv (Ukraine) | 3–1 | (Sweden) Malmö FF | Kharkiv |
| 21:05 | Taison 46', 56'; Fininho 90' | Report | Ranégie 66' | Stadium: OSC Metalist; Attendance: 25,883; Referee: (Slovenia) Matej Jug |

| 30 November 2011 5 | Metalist Kharkiv (Ukraine) | 4–1 | Austria Wien | Kharkiv |
| 19:00 | Dević 16'; Edmar 40'; Gueye 60'; Sosa 90' | Report | Mader 19' | Stadium: OSC Metalist; Attendance: 25,810; Referee: (Romania) Cristian Balaj |

| 15 December 2011 6 | AZ (Netherlands) | 1–1 | (Ukraine) Metalist Kharkiv | Alkmaar |
| 21:05 | Maher 37' | Report | Dević 37' | Stadium: AFAS Stadion; Attendance: 13,268; Referee: (Spain) Carlos Clos Gómez |

==== Knockout stage ====
===== Round of 32 =====
| 16 February 2012 First leg | Red Bull Salzburg (Austria) | 0–4 | (Ukraine) Metalist Kharkiv | Wals-Siezenheim |
| 19:00 UTC+1 | | Report | Taison 1'; Cristaldo 38', 41'; Dević 90+2' | Stadium: Red Bull Arena; Attendance: 8,100; Referee: (Croatia) Marijo Strahonja |

| 23 February 2012 Second leg | Metalist Kharkiv (Ukraine) | 4–1 (8–1 agg.) | (Austria) Red Bull Salzburg | Kharkiv |
| 21:05 UTC+2 | Hinteregger 28' (o.g.); Cristaldo 62'; Blanco 63'; Marlos 87' | Report | Jantscher 56' | Stadium: OSC Metalist; Attendance: 30,826; Referee: (France) Antony Gautier |

===== Round of 16 =====
| 8 March 2012 First leg | Metalist Kharkiv (Ukraine) | 0–1 | (Greece) Olympiacos | Kharkiv |
| 19:00 UTC+2 | | Report | Fuster 50' | Stadium: OSC Metalist; Attendance: 35,136; Referee: (Hungary) István Vad |

| 15 March 2012 Second leg | Olympiacos (Greece) | 1–2 (2–2 (a) agg.) | (Ukraine) Metalist Kharkiv | Piraeus |
| 21:05 UTC+1 | Marcano 15' | Report | Villagra 81'; Dević 86' | Stadium: Karaiskakis Stadium; Attendance: 30,077; Referee: (Romania) Ovidiu Haţegan |

===== Quarter-finals =====
| 29 March 2012 First leg | Sporting CP (Portugal) | 2–1 | (Ukraine) Metalist Kharkiv | Lisbon |
| 21:05 UTC+0 | Izmailov 51'; Insúa 64' | Report | Cleiton Xavier 90+1' (pen.) | Stadium: Estádio José Alvalade; Attendance: 40,512; Referee: (Germany) Wolfgang Stark |

| 5 April 2012 Second leg | Metalist Kharkiv (Ukraine) | 1–1 (2–3 agg.) | (Portugal) Sporting CP | Kharkiv |
| 21:05 UTC+2 | Cristaldo 57' | Report | van Wolfswinkel 44' | Stadium: OSC Metalist; Attendance: 38,633; Referee: (Scotland) Willie Collum |
