= Shumerlya Special Vehicles Plant =

The Shumerlya Special Vehicles Plant
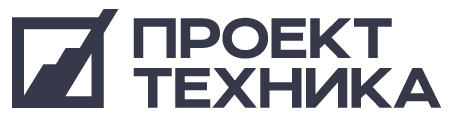
- Native name: АО "Шумерлинский завод специализированных автомобилей"
- Company type: AO
- Industry: Defence industry
- Founded: 1929; 97 years ago
- Founders: partnership "Worker"
- Headquarters: Shumerlya, Russia
- Key people: Leon Podobed (managing director)
- Production output: Special purpose equipment
- Revenue: ▲RUB 6,6 billion (2015); RUB 4,3 billion (2014); RUB 2,2 billion (2012); RUB 1,5 billion (2011)
- Net income: ▲RUB 185,8 million (2012); RUB 64,92 million (2009)
- Number of employees: 1400 (2015); ~1000 (2014)
- Website: shzsa.ru

The Shumerlya Special Vehicles Plant (Russian: Шумерлинский завод специализированных автомобилей, abbreviated ShSZA) is a monotown enterprise within the Russian military-industrial complex, a major developer and manufacturer of special purpose equipment in Russia. One of the largest Russian exporters of special purpose machinery.

The company is located in Shumerlya (Chuvashia).

== History ==
The Shumerlya Special Vehicles Plant is one of the oldest enterprises in Russia.

The factory was founded in 1929, on the basis of the partnership "Worker", which was specialized in logging, and processing of wood. The plant became the first industrial enterprise of Shumerlya. The first products of the plant were lumber and wooden parts of agricultural machinery.

In 1943 the company was transformed into the factory "Kombayndetal", which a few years later started the engineering production and manufacturing of mobile workshops for tractor brigades.

In 1967 the factory opened a Construction Bureau specialized in the repair of workshops and vans. More than 300 different types of mobile repair and other specialized vehicles were developed by the Bureau.

In 1968 the company became the supplier of vehicle-based special purpose equipment, and was renamed "Plant of Specialized Vehicles".

In 1993 ShSZA joined the corporation "Proekt-technika".

In 2007, the plant began the production of field mobile hospitals for the Russian Special Forces.

In 2009, the company created a workshop for the production of electrical transformers. Later the production was allocated to a separate company – OOO (LLC) "Proektelektrotechnika". A total amount of 553 million roubles was invested in the company.

== Production ==
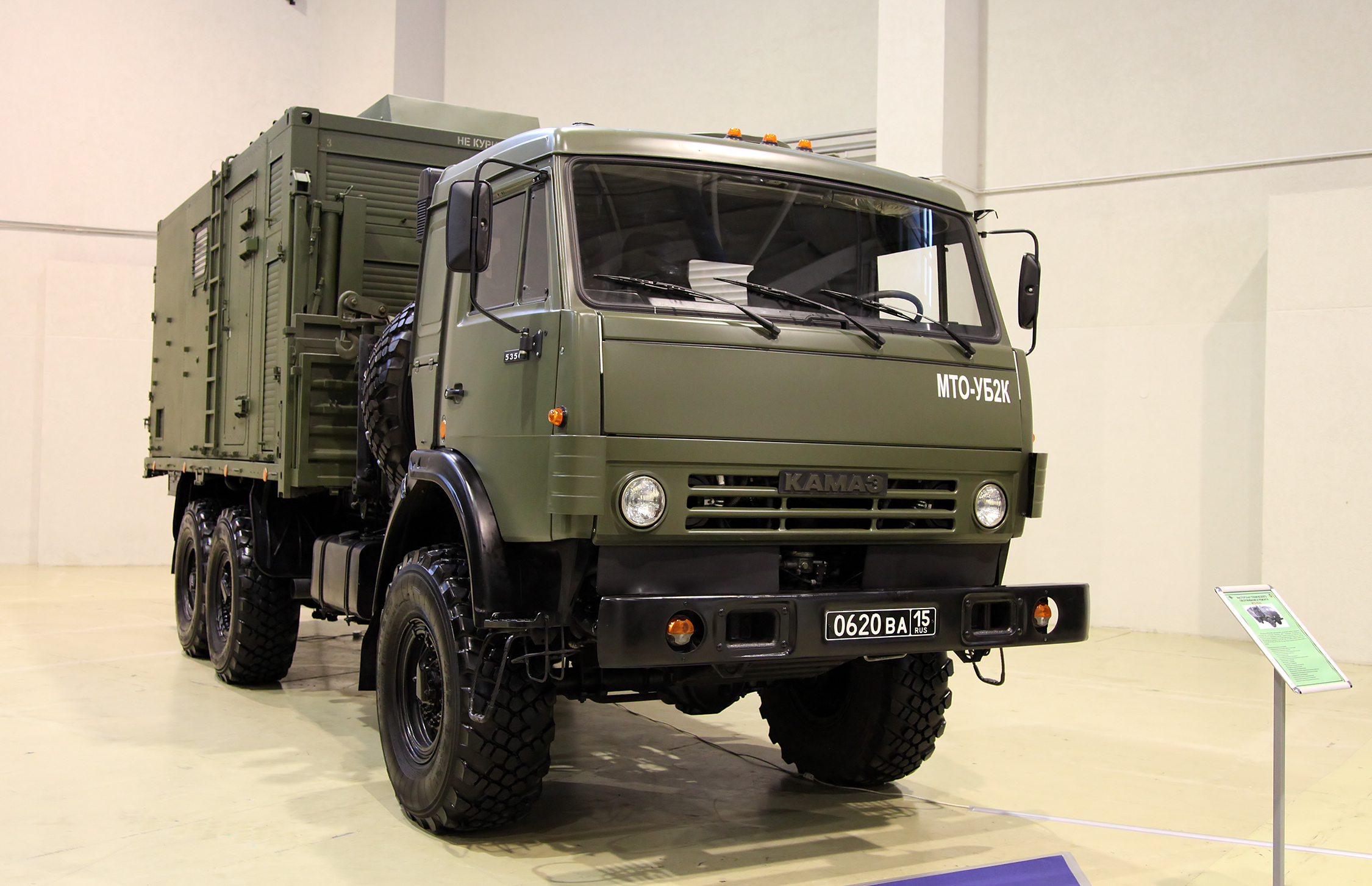

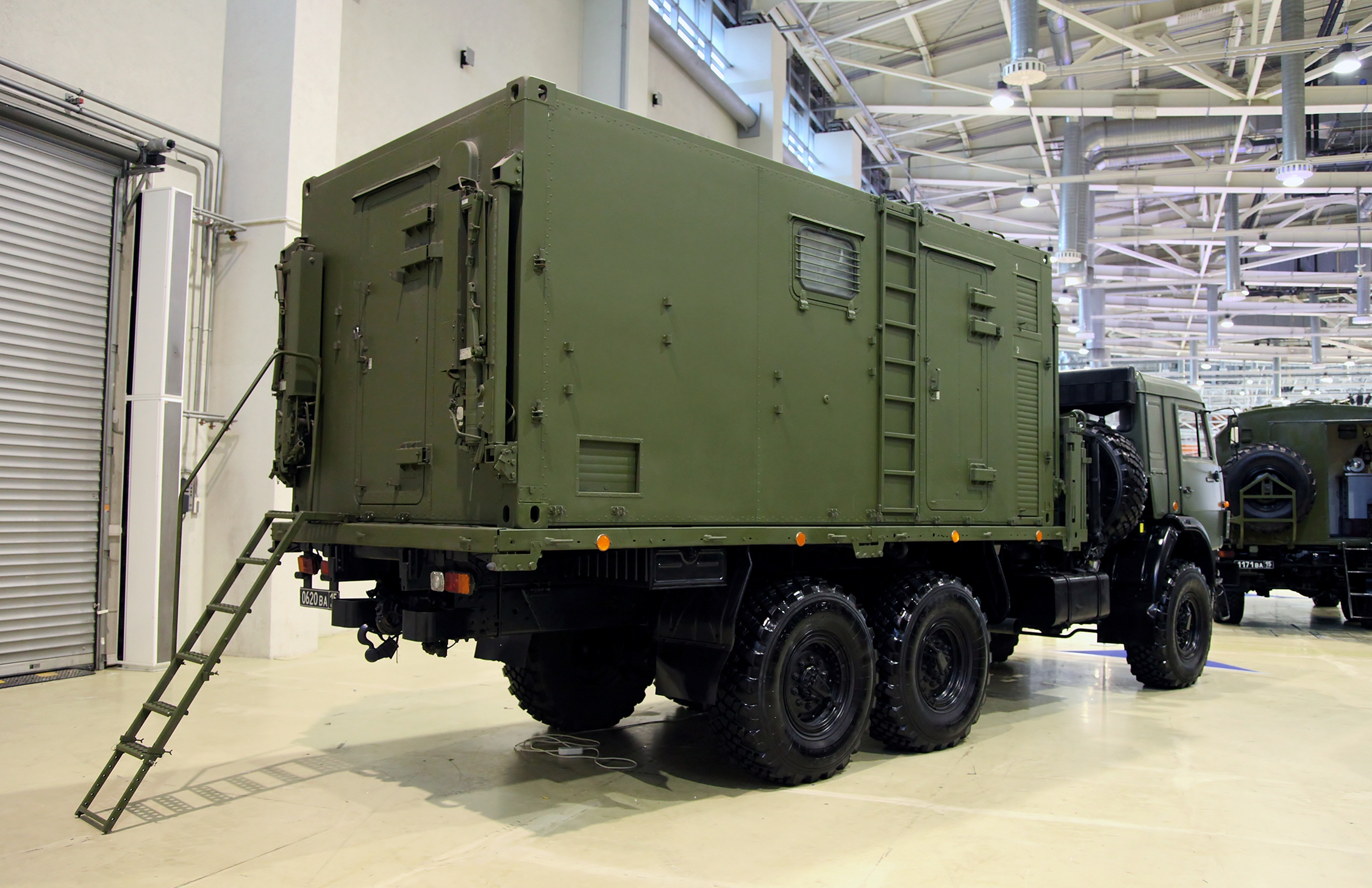

ShZSA specializes in production of mobile maintenance facilities for repair and evacuation, habitable modules of constant and variable volume, systems of mobile equipment and power complexes, and transformers.

The company is one of the main suppliers of special equipment for the Ministry of Internal Affairs of Russia (in 2010, the amount of the contracts had a total value of 333 million roubles). The company also supplies equipment for the Armed Forces of the Russian Federation within the framework of the state armaments program.

The ShZSA plant is an experimental base for the creation of new specialized mobile machinery. Since 1992, the factory has tested and put into production 60 types of specialized machinery.

== Management ==
The company is a part of the Corporation "Proekt-technika". The managing director of the company is Leon Podobed

== Finance ==
In 2012, the turnover of the company amounted to 2.20 billion RUB. (In 2011 – 1.53 billion RUB). The net profit for the year 2012 amounted to 185.8 million RUB.
