= 2019–20 Ukrainian Amateur Cup =

2019–20 Ukrainian Cup for amateur teams
Tournament details
- Country: Ukraine
- Dates: 21 August 2019 – 29 July 2020
- Teams: 27 (28 planned and 1 withdrew)

Final positions
- Champions: Olimpiya Savyntsi
- Runners-up: Viktoriya Mykolaivka
- Ukrainian Cup: Viktoriya Mykolaivka; Olympiya Savyntsi

Tournament statistics
- Matches played: 48
- Goals scored: 128 (2.67 per match)
- Attendance: 14,715 (307 per match)
- All statistics correct as of 22 July 2020.

The 2019-20 Ukrainian Amateur Cup was the 24th season of the national football cup competition for amateur teams, which was scheduled to start on August 21, 2019.

None of the last season's semifinal participants took part in the competition, including the reigning cup holder Avanhard Bziv. Both finalists competed at the 2019–20 Ukrainian Cup.

== Participated clubs ==
In bold are clubs that were active at the same season AAFU championship (parallel round-robin competition).

- Cherkasy Oblast: **LNZ-Lebedyn**
- Chernihiv Oblast: **Avanhard Koriukivka**
- Dnipropetrovsk Oblast (2): **Peremoha Dnipro**, Skoruk Tomakivka
- Donetsk Oblast (3): Pokrovsk, Sapfir Kramatorsk, **Yarud Mariupol**
- Ivano-Frankivsk Oblast: **Karpaty Halych**
- Kharkiv Oblast: Univer-Dynamo Kharkiv
- Kherson Oblast: **Tavria Novotroitske**
- Kyiv Oblast: **Rubikon-Vyshneve Kyiv**
- Luhansk Oblast (2): Budivelnyk Lysychansk, Skif Shulhynka
- Lviv Oblast: Yunist Verkhnia Bilka
- Poltava Oblast (3): Lehion Poltava, Olimpia Savyntsi, Poltava
- Rivne Oblast (2): Mayak Sarny, **ODEK Orzhiv**
- Sumy Oblast (3): LS Group Verkhnia Syrovatka, Veleten Hlukhiv, **Viktoria Mykolaivka**
- Vinnytsia Oblast: **Svitanok-Ahrosvit Shliakhova**
- Volyn Oblast: **Votrans Lutsk**
- Zaporizhzhia Oblast: Tavria-Skif Rozdol
- Zhytomyr Oblast (3): Mal Korosten, Polissia Stavky, Zviahel Novohrad-Volynskyi

== Bracket ==
The following is the bracket that demonstrates the last four rounds of the Ukrainian Cup, including the final match. Numbers in parentheses next to the match score represent the results of a penalty shoot-out.

Round of 16
Yunist Verkhnya Bilka	1	1	2
Mayak Sarny	0	1	1
ODEK Orzhiv	5	2	7
Zvyahel Novohrad-Volynskyi	1	0	1
Mal Korosten	0	0	0
Olimpiya Savyntsi	3	4	7
LNZ-Lebedyn	0	2	2
Svitanok-Ahrosvit Shlyakhova	0	0	0
Univer-Dynamo Kharkiv	3	2	5
Sapfir Kramatorsk	0	2	2
Skoruk Tomakivka	1	-	-
Viktoriya Mykolaivka	2	+	+
Skif Shulhynka	2	1	3
SC Poltava	2	3	5
Tavriya Novotroitske	3	1	4
Tavria-Skif Rozdol	0	2	2

Quarter-finals
ODEK Orzhiv	1	1	2
Yunist Verkhnya Bilka	1	0	1
LNZ-Lebedyn	3	0	3
Olimpiya Savyntsi (a)	2	1	3
Univer-Dynamo Kharkiv	1	1	2
Viktoriya Mykolaivka	1	2	3
Tavria Novotroitske	2	1	3
SC Poltava	0	0	0

Semi-finals
Olimpiya Savyntsi	2	2	4
ODEK Orzhiv	1	1	2
Tavria Novotroitske	0	0	0
Viktoriya Mykolaivka	1	2	3

Final
Olimpiya Savyntsi	1	1	2
Viktoriya Mykolaivka	1	0	1

== Results ==
=== Preliminary round ===
First games will be played on 21 August/28 August and seconds on 4 September.

Team 1	Agg.	Team 2	1st leg	2nd leg
Mayak Sarny	0–0 (4–2 p)	Votrans Lutsk	0–0	0–0 (Note: game played at Stadium, Pidhaitsi) (a.e.t.)
Polissya Stavky	0–7	Yunist Verkhnya Bilka	0–4	0–3
Karpaty-Enerhetyk Halych	-:+	Zvyahel Novohrad-Volynskyi	1–3 (Note: game played at Enerhetyk Stadium, Burshtyn)	-:+
ODEK Orzhiv	bye			
Mal Korosten	w/o	Avanhard Koryukivka		
Rubikon Vyshneve	-:+	Olimpiya Savyntsi	0–2	-:+
Lehion Poltava	1–7	Svitanok-Ahrosvit Shlyakhova	1–2 (Note: game played at Lokomotyv Stadium, Poltava)	0–5
FC LNZ-Lebedyn	bye			
Univer-Dynamo Kharkiv	4–1	Veleten Hlukhiv	2–0	2–1 (Note: game played at Druzhba Stadium, Hlukhiv)
Peremoha Dnipro	-:+	Sapfir Kramatorsk	1–3 (Note: game played at Olimpiysky Rezervy Stadium, Dnipro)	-:+
Skoruk Tomakivka	3–0	Budivelnyk Lysychansk	1–0	2–0 (Note: game played at Shakhtar Stadium, Lysychansk)
Viktoriya Mykolaivka	bye			
SC Poltava	8–2	LS Group Verkhnya Syrovatka	5–1	3–1 (Note: game played at Yuvileiny Stadium, Sumy)
Skif Shulhynka	7–1	FC Pokrovsk	5–0 (Note: game played at Kolos Stadium, Starobilsk)	2–1 (Note: game played at Shakhtar Stadium, Myrnohrad)
Yarud Mariupol	1–2	Tavria-Skif Rozdol	0–1	1–1
Tavria Novotroitske	bye			

Notes:

- On 27 August 2019 it became known that Avanhard Koryukivka withdrew right before the start of the tournament.

=== Round of 16 ===
FC ODEK Orzhiv, FC Viktoriya Mykolaivka, FC LNZ-Lebedyn, FC Tavriya Novotroitske (all the season's league participants) received a bye to the round. First games will be played on 18 September and seconds on 25 September. Pairs were confirmed on 12 September 2019.

Team 1	Agg.	Team 2	1st leg	2nd leg
Yunist Verkhnya Bilka	2–1	Mayak Sarny	1–0	1–1
ODEK Orzhiv	7–1	Zvyahel Novohrad-Volynskyi	5–1	2–0
Mal Korosten	0–7	Olimpiya Savyntsi	0–3	0–4 (Note: played at Start Stadium, Myrhorod)
FC LNZ-Lebedyn	2–0	Svitanok-Ahrosvit Shlyakhova	0–0	2–0
Univer-Dynamo Kharkiv	5–3	Sapfir Kramatorsk	3–0	2–3
Skoruk Tomakivka	-:+	Viktoriya Mykolaivka	1–2	-:+
Skif Shulhynka	3–5	SC Poltava	2–2	1–3 (Note: played at FC Poltava training base, Kopyly)
Tavria Novotroitske	3–3 (a)	Tavria-Skif Rozdol	3–0	1–2

=== Quarterfinals ===
First games will be played on 9 October and seconds on 16 October. Pairs were confirmed on 27 September 2019.

Team 1	Agg.	Team 2	1st leg	2nd leg
ODEK Orzhiv	2–1	Yunist Verkhnya Bilka	1–1	1–0 (Note: game played at Markevych Stadium, Vynnyky)
FC LNZ-Lebedyn	3–3 (a)	Olimpiya Savyntsi	3–2	0–1
Univer-Dynamo Kharkiv	2–3	Viktoriya Mykolaivka	1–1	1–2
Tavria Novotroitske	3–0	SC Poltava	2–0	1–0

=== Semifinals ===
The dates of games are 8 and 15 July 2020.

Team 1	Agg.	Team 2	1st leg	2nd leg
Olimpiya Savyntsi	4–2	ODEK Orzhiv	2–1	2–1 (Note: played at Meblevyk Stadium, Smyha)
Tavria Novotroitske	0–3	Viktoriya Mykolaivka	0–1 (Note: played at Marianivskyi Stadium, Marianivka)	0–2

=== Final ===
The dates of games are 22 and 29 July 2020.

Team 1	Agg.	Team 2	1st leg	2nd leg
Olimpiya Savyntsi	2–1	Viktoriya Mykolaivka	1–1	1–0

Winner of the 2019–20 Ukrainian Football Cup among amateur teams
Olimpiya Savyntsi (Poltava Oblast); 1st time

== See also ==
- 2019–20 Ukrainian Football Amateur League
- 2019–20 Ukrainian Cup
