= Serhiy Bashkyrov =

Ukrainian footballer (1959–2023)

Personal information
- Full name: Serhiy Hennadiyovych Bashkyrov
- Date of birth: 11 March 1959
- Place of birth: Shumerlya, Chuvash ASSR, Russian SFSR, USSR
- Date of death: 19 September 2023 (aged 64)
- Place of death: Dnipro, Ukraine
- Height: 1.78 m (5 ft 10 in)
- Position: Midfielder

Youth career
- 196?–1976: Zvezda Shumerlya

Senior career*
Years	Team	Apps	(Gls)
1976–1978	Stal Cheboksary	69	(20)
1979	Spartak Moscow	0	(0)
1979	Pakhtakor Tashkent	5	(0)
1980	Stal Cheboksary	7	(0)
1980–1981	Krylia Sovetov Kuybyshev	43	(0)
1982	Iskra Smolensk	32	(1)
1983	Metalurh Zaporizhzhia	33	(3)
1984–1988	Dnipro Dnipropetrovsk	145	(2)
1989–1991	Metalurh Zaporizhzhia	75	(2)
1991	Dnipro Dnipropetrovsk	0	(0)
1991–1992	KS Wasilków	13	(0)
1992	Metalurh Zaporizhzhia	2	(0)
1993–1994	Rot-Weiß Oberhausen	11	(0)

Managerial career
- 1997–2000: Kryvbas Kryvyi Rih (assistant)
- 2001–2002: Metalurh Zaporizhzhia (assistant)
- 2002–2003: Opava (assistant)
- 2003: Slovan Bratislava (assistant)
- 2007–2009: Kryvbas Kryvyi Rih (assistant)
- 2012–2013: Kryvbas Kryvyi Rih (assistant)
- 2013–2015: Metalurh Zaporizhzhia (assistant)
- 2018–2019: Metalurh Zaporizhzhia (assistant)
- 2020–2021: Peremoha Dnipro (assistant)
- * Club domestic league appearances and goals

Serhiy Hennadiyovych Bashkyrov (Ukrainian: Сергій Геннадійович Башкиров; 11 March 1959 – 19 September 2023) was a Soviet and Ukrainian football coach and player.

== Personal life and death ==
Native of the Volga Region Chuvashia, Bashkyrov married one of a pair of twin sisters, together with another Ukrainian football coach Oleh Taran. His daughter Natalya is the wife of the Croatian international footballer Mladen Bartulović.

Serhiy Bashkyrov died on 19 September 2023, at the age of 64.

== Honours ==
=== Player ===
Dnipro Dnipropetrovsk

- Soviet Top League: 1988; runner-up 1987; bronze 1984, 1985
