= Proekt-technika =

Corporation "Proekt-technika»
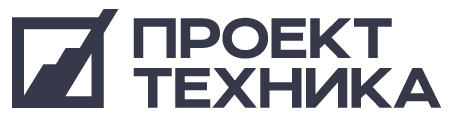
- Native name: ООО "Корпорация "Проект-техника»
- Type: Limited liability company
- Industry: Defence industry
- Founded: 1988
- Headquarters: Oryol, Shumerlya, Moscow, Cheboksary, Rybinsk, Bronnitsy, Korolyov, Russia
- Key people: Shavasp Kalashyan (Chairman of the Board of the company)
- Revenue: ▲ ~RUB3 billion
- Number of employees: ~2500
- Website: pr-t.ru

Corporation "Proekt-technika" (Russian: ООО "Корпорация "Проект-техника") is one of Russia's largest machine-manufacturing companies, and a part of the Russian military-industrial complex.

== History ==
Corporation "Proekt-technika" was established in 1988. The “Radon” production cooperative was also founded this year.

In 1990, "Buran" program members founded the "Proekt-technika" Design Bureau.

In 1993, Shumerlya Special Vehicles Plant merged with the corporation.

In 2009, the "Proektelektrotechnika" enterprise was established to produce dry-type three-phase electrical transformers. The Corporation starts to supply mobile field hospitals for export.

In 2011, the "Oreltekmash" enterprise became a part of the Corporation "Proekt-technika".

== Production ==
Corporation "Proekt-technika" develops, manufactures and provides aftersale maintenance of mobile special and multipurpose equipment. The company is the largest supplier of mobile equipment for the security agencies of the Russian Federation. The company’s products are listed in the State Armament Program of the Russian Federation and are exported to 21 countries.

The company produces three levels of equipment which differ from each other by the percentage of foreign components and materials in the equipment (at the request of the Ministry of Defense of the Russian Federation, it is prohibited to use foreign materials in some samples of special equipment). More than 1000 units of equipment are produced annually.

== Structure and management ==
Corporation "Proekt-technika" includes mobile equipment production plants (Shumerlya Special Vehicles Plant, Oreltekmash), transformers production plant (Proektelektrotechnika), engineering, and service centers.

According to the 2013 data, about 2500 employees are working at the company’s enterprises.

Shavasp Kalashyan is the Chairman of the Board of the company.

== Finances ==
The primary customer of Corporation "Proekt-technika" is the Ministry of Defense of the Russian Federation. In 2008 the Main Automotive-Armored Tank Directorate of the Ministry of Defense of the Russian Federation signed a three-year contract with the company worth four billion rubles for the supply of maintenance shops.

In 2012–2013, the turnover of the two largest enterprises of Corporation "Proekt-technika" (ShZSA and Oreltekmash) totaled up to 2.20 billion and 700 million rubles respectively.
