= Ivan Kryvosheyenko =

Ukrainian footballer

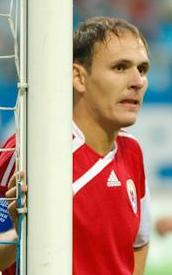

Personal information
- Full name: Ivan Vasylyovych Kryvosheyenko
- Date of birth: 11 May 1984 (age 42)
- Place of birth: Pryluky, Ukrainian SSR
- Height: 1.81 m (5 ft 11 1/2 in)
- Position: Forward

Youth career
- 1999–2001: FC CSKA Kyiv

Senior career*
Years	Team	Apps	(Gls)
2000–2002	Arsenal Kyiv	0	(0)
2000–2002	→ CSKA / CSKA-2 Kyiv	49	(3)
2000	→ Systema-Borex Borodianka (loan)	1	(0)
2002–2003	Metalurh Donetsk	4	(0)
2002–2003	→ Metalurh-2 Donetsk	19	(8)
2003–2011	Illichivets Mariupol	172	(22)
2007	→ Illichivets-2 Mariupol	10	(6)
2011–2014	Vorskla Poltava	78	(5)
2015–2016	Kolos Kovalivka	39	(3)
2017	Kolos Lazirky		
2017–2018	FC Juniors Shpytki		
2019–2020	FC Hatne		

International career
2005–2006	Ukraine U-21	9	(0)
Medal record
Men's football
Representing Ukraine
UEFA European Under-21 Championship
Runner-up	2006 Portugal
- * Club domestic league appearances and goals

Ivan Kryvosheyenko (born 11 May 1984) is a professional Ukrainian former football striker who last played for FC Vorskla Poltava in the Ukrainian Premier League.
