= Poltava Oblast Super Cup =

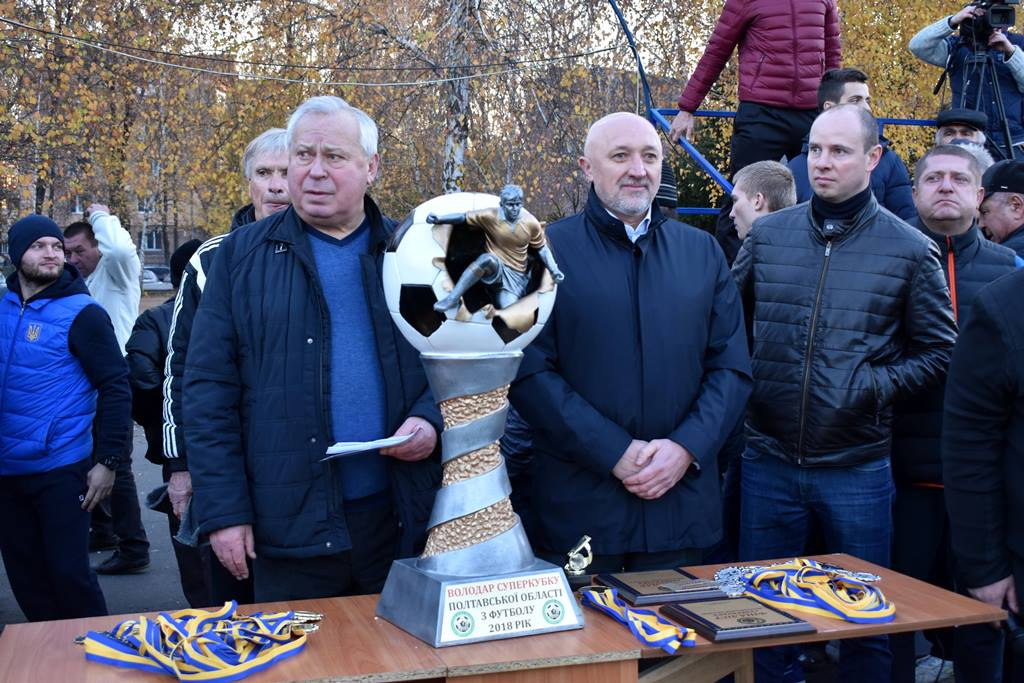
- 2018 Trophy
- Organiser(s): Football Association of Poltava Oblast
- Founded: 2014; 12 years ago
- Region: Poltava Oblast
- Teams: 2
- Current champions: Rokyta (4th title)
- Most championships: Rokyta (4 titles)
- Broadcaster(s): Kremen TV, AFP

The Poltava Oblast Super Cup (Ukrainian: Суперкубок Полтавської області з футболу) is a one-off football amateur match in Poltava Oblast that features the winners of the Poltava Oblast championship and the Poltava Oblast Cup. The Poltava Oblast Super Cup is run by the Football Association of Poltava Oblast. The current holder is Rokyta who won their fourth cup.

== History ==
Inaugural game of the Super Cup was played in Karlivka on 1 November 2014. Match was played by Poltava Oblast Champion SC Poltava and Cup winner Olympia. Olympia player Vladyslav Rudchenko scored the first goal on nineteenth minute. Two minutes later Dmytro Kuimov scored a penalty for SC Poltava and on fifty-fifth minute Yurii Fomenko scored the winning goal with a header from a corner kick. Game ended 2:1 with SC Poltava winning the first title.

Next season Olympia returned as a cup winner to play with Rokyta who won that years championship. Game was played in Pyriatyn on 24 October 2015. First player to score was Rokyta footballer Roman Semuka who did so at sixty-fifth minute. At the seventy-third minute another Rokyta player Arsen Manasian doubled the score. Olympia player Serhii Hrytsenko scored in stoppage time to repeat previous years result.

On 12 November 2016 a repeat of that years cup final was played in Poltava. Olympia as a championship and cup winner faced Velyka Bahachka who was the cups runners-up. However unlike the cup final where Olympia won, Velyka Bahachka scored four goals to Olympia's two. With first attack led to Olympia leading. Olavale Fabunmi put the ball in the back of the net four minutes after the match began. Ivan Kharchenko equalized for Velyka Bahachka on seventeenth minute. Dmytro Milko scored the next goal at twenty-ninth minute. During stoppage time another Velyka Bahachka player Ruslan Levyha scored. Two minutes after start of second half Milko scored the fourth goal for his team. Olympia scorer Fabunmi bagged another goal during stoppage time. However that did not help his team to win the Poltava Oblast treble.

Next season Olympia tried to win the treble again. 2015 winner Rokyta returned as a cup runners-up where they lost to Olympia. The match was played in Poltava on 11 November 2017 ended as a scoreless draw. It was the first game requiring penalty shoot-out. After five players scored for each teams, Olympia striker Yevhen Spivak hit the post. Then Rokyta player Yevhen Malyk scored his penalty kick to win his clubs second trophy.

On 8 November 2018 Olympia returned for the third year in a row as championship and cup winners. Game was played in Poltava and Kolos Lazirky made their first appearance. Mykhailo Priadko scored the first goal for Kolos on twelfth minute. Olympia equalized three minutes later through Vladyslav Kovtun. Vahe Sarkisian scored another goal for Kolos on fortieth minute to win their first trophy.

On 6 November 2019 Olympia finally saw a change in fortune. After appearing in their sixth consecutive match they won 1:0 against cup winners Lehion Poltava. Striker Roman Kirpichenko scored the only goal during the seventy-sixth minute.

2020 Super Cup was scheduled to be played on 25 November 2020. The Cup final Cup scheduled to be played on 11 November, was delayed on 9 November by Covid restrictions. Cup final was played on the 3 December between Olympia and SC Poltava. Olympia controversially won in last seconds of the game. This led to SC Poltava refusing to take part in the Super Cup due to Football Association inability to provide high quality, impartial refereeing.

2021 was the first year to not feature Olympia. On 28 November 2021 championship and cup winner KLF Poltava met with Standart Novi Sanzhary in Kremenchuk. On seventh minute KLF player Oleh Bazhan saw opposing players off the line and sent the ball into the net. Dmytro Verhun scored from the penalty spot on forty-fifth minute to make he score one all. This was the second game to go to penalty kicks. Illia Ichuaidze was the only player to have his penalty saved. Game was won by KLF 5:4 on penalties.

On 10 December 2022 Standart returned as a championship winner to face returning Olympia who won the cup in Poltava. Dmytro Verhun scored the opener on nineteenth minute. However Olympia came back in second half to win their second title. Oleksandr Ponomarenko scored on sixty-eighth and Vladyslav Nasibulin on seventy-fourth minutes.

On 4 November 2023 two time winners Olympia and Rokyta met in Poltava. At the thirty-ninth minute an almost three hour break took place due to air raid sirens. Yurii Fomenko was the first player to score, giving Rokyta the lead at the fifty-second minute. With eight minutes remaining Olympia player Denys Pochernin equalized. With the score even, penalty shootout was needed to find the winner. Olympia players were the first to shoot. Each team converted eleven penalty kicks before both next players had their shots save by the keepers. Two Olympia players converted their penalties while only one of the Rokyta players did the same. Rokyta player Serhii Hrytsenko took the last kick and missed the goal giving Olympia the trophy after twenty-eight penalty kicks.

Olympia and Rokyta met again on 23 November 2024 at Dynamo Stadium in Poltava. In a rainy match, Andrii Misiailo scored a twenty-eights minute penalty to help his side win the Super Cup.

Olympia and Rokyta met for the third year on 29 October 2025 at Molodizhnyi Stadium in Poltava. Mykola Boiko gave Rokyta the lead at the end of the first halt. With the increased tempo in early second half Olympia managed to equalize through Vadym Loboda in the fifty-fifth minute. Nazar Sapiha scored the winner for Rokyta twenty one minutes later. Rokyta won their fourth super cup.

== Rules ==
If the scores are level after 90 minutes, the teams play a penalty shootout. If a team wins both the Poltava Oblast Championship and the Poltava Oblast Cup, the runner-up from the Cup will play.

== Matches ==
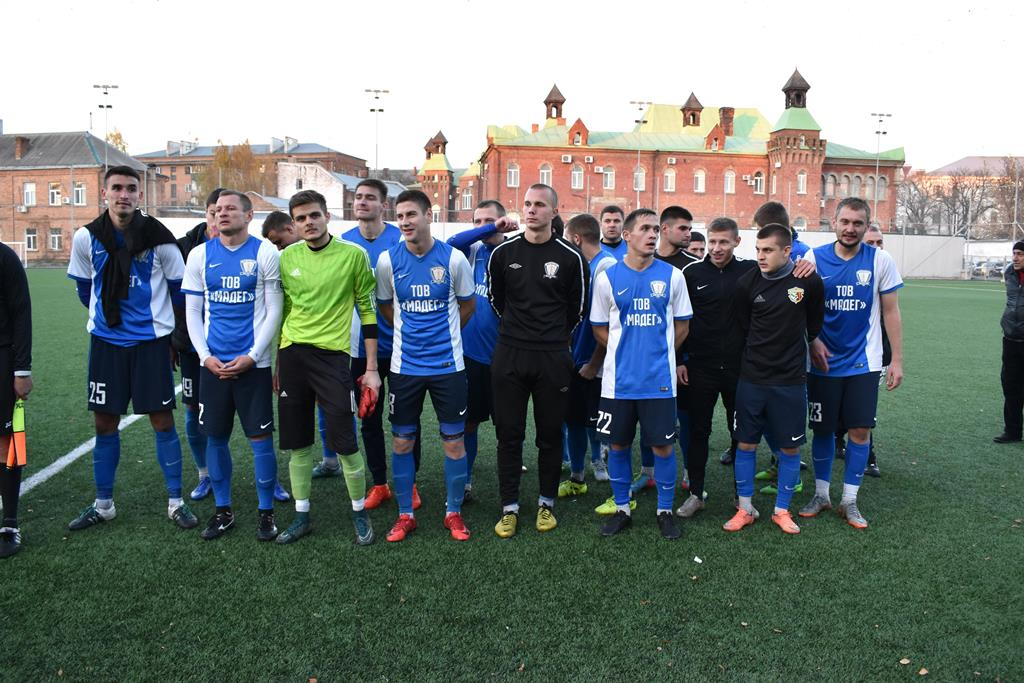
2018 Winners Kolos Lazirky

Below is a list of the Super Cup winners.

Date	Poltava Oblast Champion	Result	Poltava Oblast Cup Winner (Note: Unless noted otherwise.)	Venue	Notes
1 November 2014	SC Poltava	2:1	Olympia Savyntsi	Mashynobudivnyk Stadium, Karlivka	
24 October 2015	Rokyta	2:1	Olympia Savyntsi	Yuvileinyi Stadium, Pyriatyn	
12 November 2016	Olympia Savyntsi	2:4	Velyka Bahachka (Note: Poltava Oblast Cup runners-up.)	Dynamo Stadium, Poltava	
11 November 2017	Olympia Savyntsi	0:0 (5–6 p)	Rokyta	Dynamo Stadium, Poltava	
8 November 2018	Olympia Savyntsi	1:2	Kolos Lazirky	Dynamo Stadium, Poltava	
6 November 2019	Olympia Savyntsi	1:0	Lehion Poltava	Oleksiy Butovsky Vorskla Stadium, Poltava	
2020	Not held				
28 November 2021	KLF Poltava	1:1 (5–4 p)	Standart Novi Sanzhary	Kremin Arena, Kremenchuk	
10 December 2022	Standart Novi Sanzhary	1:2	Olympia Savyntsi	Molodizhnyi Stadium, Poltava	
4 November 2023	Olympia Savyntsi	1:1 (13–12 p)	Rokyta	Oleksiy Butovsky Vorskla Stadium, Poltava	
23 November 2024	Rokyta	1:0	Olympia Savyntsi	Dynamo Stadium, Poltava	
29 October 2025	Olympia Savyntsi	1:2	Rokyta	Molodizhnyi Stadium, Poltava	

== Performances ==
=== Performance by team ===
Team	Winners	Runners-up	Years won	Years lost
Rokyta	4	1	2015, 2017, 2024, 2025	2023
Olympia Savyntsi	3	7	2019, 2022, 2023	2014, 2015, 2016, 2017, 2018, 2024, 2025
SC Poltava	1	—	2014	—
Velyka Bahachka	1	—	2016	—
Kolos Lazirky	1	—	2018	—
KLF Poltava	1	—	2021	—
Standart Novi Sanzhary	—	2	—	2021, 2022
Lehion Poltava	—	1	—	2019

=== Performance by qualification ===
Competition	Winners	Runners-up
Poltava Oblast Champion winners	6	5
Poltava Oblast Cup winners	2	4
Poltava Oblast Cup runners-up	3	2

== Top goalscorers ==
Rank	Player	Club(s)	Goals
1	Olavale Fabunmi	Olympia Savyntsi	2
1	Dmytro Milko	Velyka Bahachka	2
1	Dmytro Verhun	Standart Novi Sanzhary	2
1	Yurii Fomenko	SC Poltava/Rokyta	2
2	Vladyslav Rudchenko	Olympia Savyntsi	1
2	Dmytro Kuimov	SC Poltava	1
2	Roman Semuka	Rokyta	1
2	Arsen Manasian	Rokyta	1
2	Serhii Hrytsenko	Olympia Savyntsi	1
2	Ivan Kharchenko	Velyka Bahachka	1
2	Ruslan Levyha	Velyka Bahachka	1
2	Mykhailo Priadko	Kolos Lazirky	1
2	Vladyslav Kovtun	Olympia Savyntsi	1
2	Vahe Sarkisian	Kolos Lazirky	1
2	Roman Kirpichenko	Olympia Savyntsi	1
2	Oleh Bazhan	KLF Poltava	1
2	Oleksandr Ponomarenko	Olympia Savyntsi	1
2	Vladyslav Nasibulin	Olympia Savyntsi	1
2	Denys Pochernin	Olympia Savyntsi	1
2	Andrii Misiailo	Rokyta	1
2	Vadym Loboda	Olympia Savyntsi	1
2	Mykola Boiko	Rokyta	1
2	Nazar Sapiha	Rokyta	1
