= Oreltekmash =

Russian defense manufacturing company

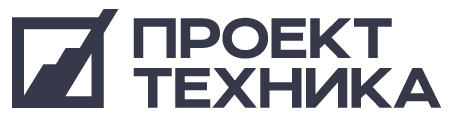
- Native name: ПАО "Орёлтекмаш»
- Company type: Public company (PJSC)
- Industry: Defence industry
- Founded: 1854
- Founders: Pereligin brothers
- Headquarters: Oryol, Russia
- Key people: Leon Podobed (managing director); George Zolotarev (chairman of the board of directors)
- Revenue: ▲RUB 1 billion (2015); RUB 0,7 billion (2013); RUB 0,08 billion (2004)
- Number of employees: ~675 (2015); ~500 (2013); 700 (2004)
- Website: tekmash.ru

Oreltekmash (Russian: Орёлтекмаш) is a major Russian military manufacturer, one of the oldest Russian enterprises (160 years as of 2014). Headquartered in the town of Oryol.

== History ==
In 1854, a workshop was opened in Oryol, which produced hammers, iron castings, brakes, horse drives and other products. In 1914, the first workshop for metal was organized within its facilities. Initially, the plant was known as the "Iron Foundry Plant of Perelygin brothers".

In 1930, the company started to specialize in the production of machines for the processing of baste fibers. The plant then took the name "Tekmash".

In 1936, the production area of the plant was expanded and new mechanical and foundry departments were built for the production of more specialized products such as machine-tools and spare parts for the textile industry. During the World War II the factory was evacuated to the Penza region and redesigned for the production of equipment for the Russian rocket forces. The redesigning happened quite quickly because of the similar requirements for precision in the machine-tools for the textile industry and those for military engineering. The company became a production site for the Russian Main Missile and Artillery Control. After the war, the company continued the production of textile machinery for the processing of baste fibers.

In the late 70s—early 80s, the company started the production of machines for the processing of wool. Prior to 2004, 20% of the company shares were state-owned.

In 2011, Oreltekmash became part of the Corporation "Proekt-technika", the process of updating the technical equipment of the plant began. According to Interfax, in 2014 the plant was expanded with a new workshop for military equipment.

== Production ==
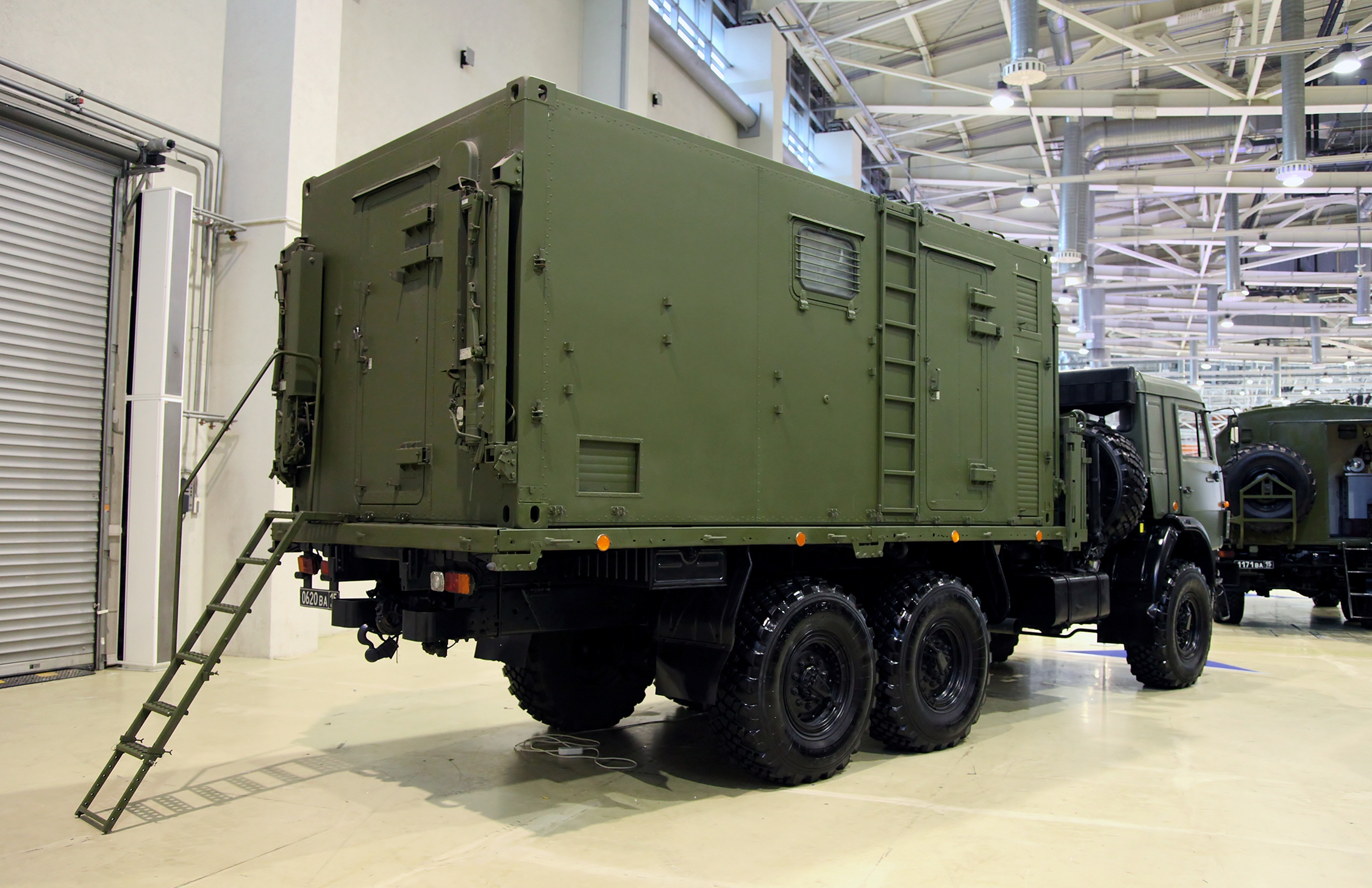

Oreltekmash specializes in the production of mobile maintenance and repairs vehicles as well as mobile complexes based on containers and special purpose containers for the needs of the Military-Industrial Complex of Russia.

The plant has several production lines, including assembly of mobile maintenance and recovery vehicles, assembly of special purpose products, forging and punching, machine processing, casting.

Based on the data from 2007, 90% of the plant's production was made for the Russian defense industry. According to data from 2014, the annual production growth of the plant is about 40%.

== Management ==
Oreltekmash is a part of the Corporation "Proekt-Technika". The managing director of the company is Leon Podobed.

The chairman of the board of directors of ПAO "Oreltekmash" is George Zolotarev.
