= FC Kolos Lazirky =

Ukrainian football club from Lazirky, Ukraine

Kolos Lazirky
- Full name: Football Club Kolos Lazirky
- Founded: 1956
- Ground: Kolos, Lazirky

Football Club Kolos Lazirky (Ukrainian: Футбольний клуб Колос (Лазірки)); is a Ukrainian football team based in Lazirky, Ukraine.

== History ==
Club was formed in 1956 as Kolhospnyk. In 1969 it was renamed Kolos. They occasionally took part in Oblast Championship and Cup. It won the Orzhytsia Raion championship thirteen times and raion cup nine times. In 2016 Club chose to participate in Poltava Oblast Championship. Club finished second in the league during the 2016, 2017 and 2018.

On 15 September 2018 lost 2–0 to Olimpiia Savyntsi in the Poltava Oblast Cup final. On 8 November 2018 Kolos defeated Olimpiia Savyntsi 2–1 to lift its first major trophy of the Poltava Oblast. In next season the club chose no to participate in the 2019 Football Championship of Poltava Oblast.

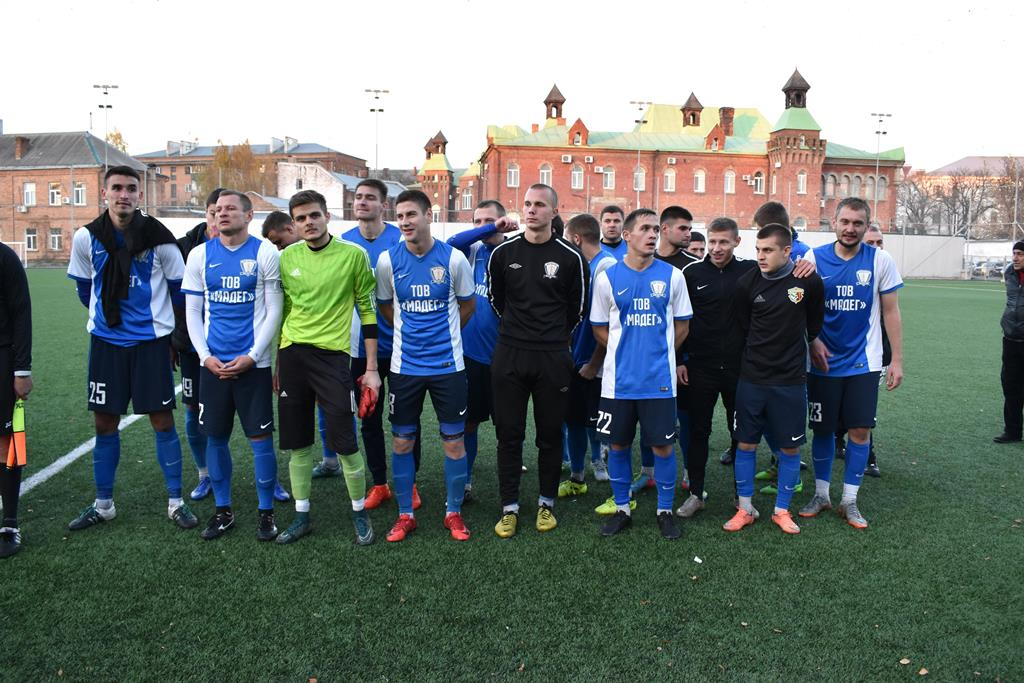
2018 Super Cup Winners.

== Honours ==
Poltava Oblast Championship

Runners-up (3): 2016, 2017, 2018

Poltava Oblast Cup

Runners-up (1): 2018

Poltava Oblast Super Cup

Winners (1): 2018

== Sources ==
- Lomov, Anatolii; Stadnychenko, Oleksandr (2009), 100 Років Полтавському Футболу [100 Years of Poltava Football] (in Ukrainian), Poltava: Poltava, ISBN 978-966-97035-0-7
- Lomov, Anatolii; Kryvorotko, Serhii (2010), Энциклопеди Полтавского Футбола (1909-2010) [Encyclopedia of Poltava Football (1909-2010)] (in Russian), Poltava: OOO "ASMI", ISBN 978-966-182-118-6
