= Njegoš Janjušević =

Serbian footballer (born 1996)

Personal information
- Date of birth: 5 August 1996 (age 30)
- Place of birth: Prijepolje, FR Yugoslavia
- Height: 1.75 m (5 ft 9 in)
- Position: Full-back

Team information
- Current team: Drina Zvornik

Youth career
- Bežanija

Senior career*
Years	Team	Apps	(Gls)
2014–2015	Bežanija	0	(0)
2015–2016	Dunajská Streda	0	(0)
2016–2017	Jedinstvo Putevi	22	(1)
2017–2019	Borac Čačak	32	(0)
2017–2018	→ Polet Ljubić (loan)	14	(0)
2020	BSK Borča		
2020–2021	Loznica	28	(1)
2021–2022	Zlatibor Čajetina	32	(0)
2022	Peremoha Dnipro	0	(0)
2023	Trayal Kruševac	12	(0)
2023	FAP Priboj		
2024	Loznica		
2024-	Drina Zvornik		
- * Club domestic league appearances and goals as of 25 June 2023

Njegoš Janjušević (Serbian Cyrillic: Његош Јањушевић; born 5 August 1996) is a Serbian professional footballer who plays for Drina Zvornik.

== Career statistics ==
As of 22 April 2019

Club	Season	League			Cup		Continental		Other		Total	
Club	Season	Division	Apps	Goals	Apps	Goals	Apps	Goals	Apps	Goals	Apps	Goals
Bežanija	2014–15	Serbian First League	0	0	0	0	—		—		0	0
DAC Dunajská Streda	2015–16	Slovak Super Liga	0	0	1	0	—		—		1	0
Jedinstvo Putevi	2016–17	Serbian League West	22	1	—		—		—		22	1
Polet Ljubić (loan)	2017–18	Serbian League West	14	0	—		—		—		14	0
Borac Čačak	2017–18	Serbian SuperLiga	1	0	0	0	—		—		1	0
Borac Čačak	2018–19	Serbian First League	31	0	2	1	—		—		33	1
Borac Čačak	Total		32	0	2	1	—		—		34	1
Career total			68	1	3	1	—		—		71	2
