= FC Peremoha Dnipro =

Peremoha Dnipro
- Full name: FC Peremoha Dnipro
- Founded: 2017
- Dissolved: 2022
- Ground: Olimpiyski Rezervy Stadium, Dnipro
- Chairman: Femis Sagirov
- Manager: Serhiy Vorobey
- League: Ukrainian Second League
- 2020–21: Ukrainian Second League, 9th of 12
Home colours	Away colours

FC Peremoha Dnipro (Ukrainian: Футбольний клуб «Перемога») was a professional Ukrainian football club from the city of Dnipro. It disbanded in August 2022. The team played in the Ukrainian Second League after competing in the Ukrainian Amateur championship.

== History ==
The team was founded in 2017. It is named after one of neighborhoods in Dnipro. "Peremoha" debuted in the Ukrainian Second League in the 2020–21 season.

In July 2022 the management of the club stated it intended withdrew from professional football due to the Russian invasion of Ukraine. The club expressed the desire to return in the 2023–24 season The club withdrew from the Second League in August 2022. The former chairman of the club, Femis Sagirov, then bought Cypriot club Geroskipou FC. He left this club in 2024 to acquire another Cypriot club, Peyia 2014.

=== Former names ===
- 2017–2018 Don Giros Dnipro
- 2018– Peremoha Dnipro

== Players ==
As of 5 March 2023 Note: Flags indicate national team as defined under FIFA eligibility rules; some limited exceptions apply. Players may hold more than one non-FIFA nationality.

No.	Pos.	Nation	Player
1	GK	UKR	Maksym Luhovskyi
6	MF	UKR	Vladyslav Krayev (on loan from Metalist Kharkiv)
8	DF	UKR	Andriy Tsopa
11	FW	UKR	Daniil Shmelyov
12	GK	UKR	Ibrahim Suaib
17	MF	UKR	Dzhaba Fkhakadze
21	FW	FRA	Marvin Macrez
23	MF	UKR	Kyrylo Pavlyuk

No.	Pos.	Nation	Player
28	DF	UKR	Bohdan Rudavskyi
32	FW	NGA	Bright John Essien
77	MF	UKR	Herasime Rezesidze
99	DF	UKR	Rodion Serdyuk
—	GK	UKR	Artur Denchuk (on loan from Metalist Kharkiv)
—	DF	SRB	Njegoš Janjušević
—	FW	UKR	Mykola Rohulin

== League and cup history ==
Season	Div.	Pos.	Pl.	W	D	L	GS	GA	P	Domestic Cup	Europe	Notes
2018–19	4th	6	22	7	8	7	28	28	29			
2019–20	4th	7	18	3	2	13	9	42	11			Promoted
2020–21	3rd											

== Managers ==
- 2017–2018 Femis Sahirov
- 2018–2020 Hennadiy Zhylkin
- 2020 Yevhen Fetysov
- 2020 Yevhen Yarovenko
- 2020–2021 Pavlo Taran
- 2021 Dmytro Ryaboy
- 2021– Serhiy Vorobey
