= FC Olympia Savyntsi =

Olimpiya Savyntsi
- Full name: Football Club Olimpiya Savyntsi
- Founded: 1976
- Ground: Savyntsi, Savyntsi; Start, Myrhorod
- Capacity: 3 700
- Chairman: Tetyana Sytnyk
- Manager: Oleksandr Kulyk
- League: Ukrainian Amateur League
- 2020–21: Ukrainian Amateur League, Group 2, 3rd of 11
Home colours	Away colours	Third colours

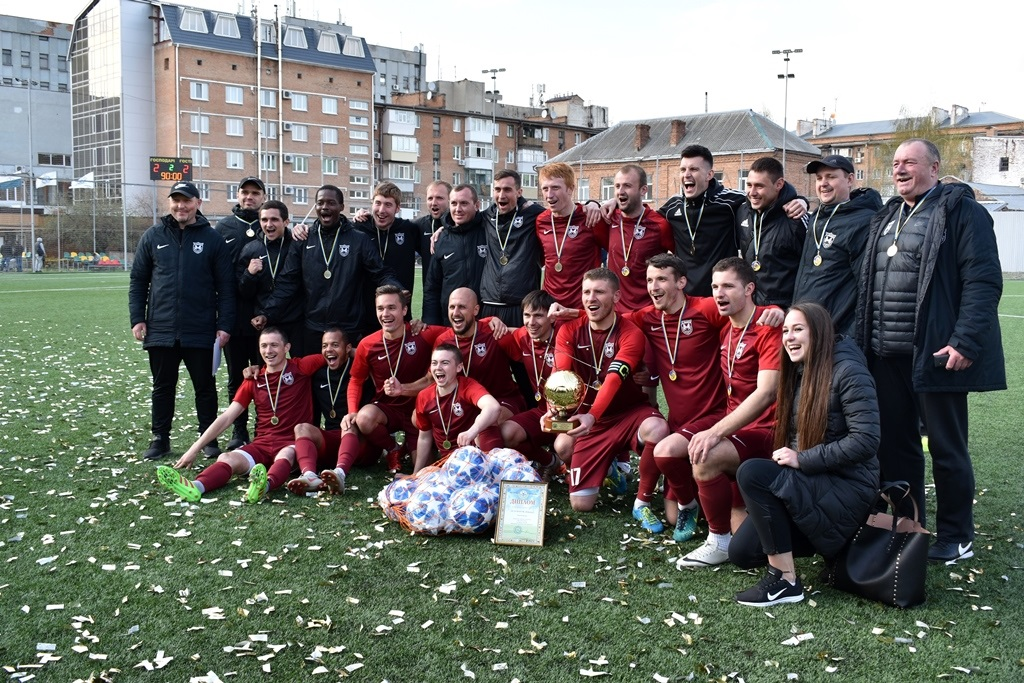
The 2019 squad at the Poltava stadium "Dynamo" (April 2019)

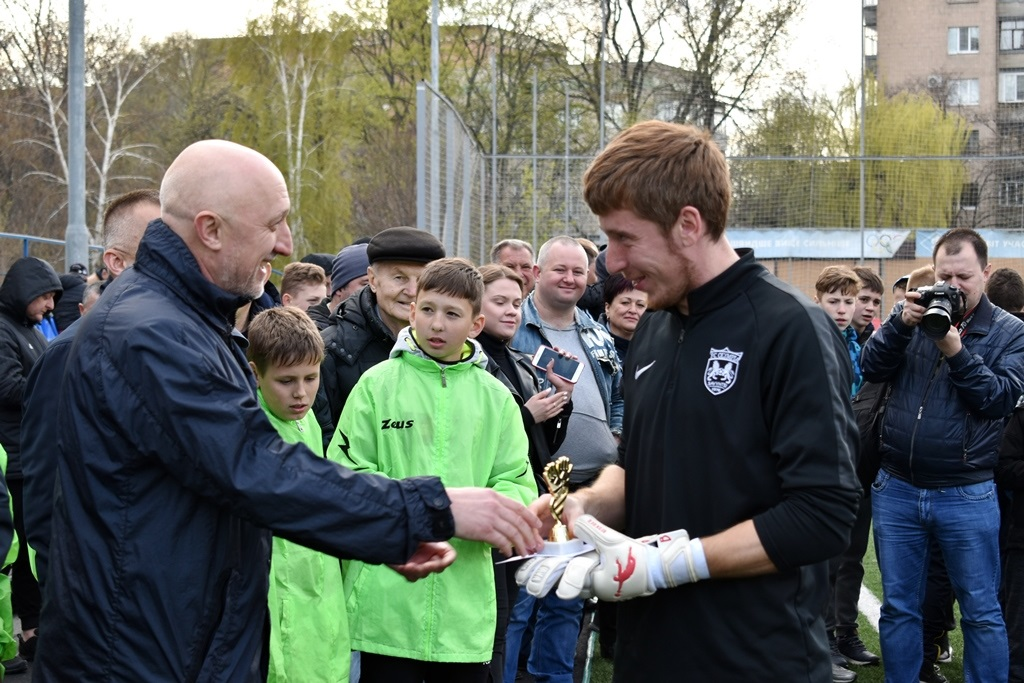
An Olimpiya player with the club's logo that has reversed color scheme

Football Club Olimpiya Savyntsi (Ukrainian: Олімпія Савинці) or Olympia Savyntsi is a Ukrainian amateur football team from Savyntsi, Myrhorod Raion. In 2020 the team won the Amateur Cup.

Savyntsi is located close to Velyki Sorochyntsi and Myrhorod. Due to proximity, Olympia often plays its more important games in Myrhorod.

== History ==
Previously in 1976–1985 Savyntsi was represented by another football team from the local "Bolshevik" collective farm. In 2011 the team was reanimated at the agricultural company "Savyntsi".

In 2015, the club made its debut at national level in the Ukrainian Amateur Cup. It was eliminated in the starting round by Ahrobiznes TSC Romny. The club made a history after winning the 2019–20 Ukrainian Amateur Cup competitions. Since 2020 it competes in the Ukrainian Amateur Football Championship.

While having an amateur status in 2020s, due to its performance in the Amateur Cup, Olympia has been often featured in the Ukrainian Cup which predominantly involves participation of professional squads.

During the 2024–25 season, closer to its finish, the club lost its president Oleksandr Kulyk who died at age of 50. The AAFU, Amateur League, postponed its season's calendar game against Rebel Kyiv.

== Honours ==
- Ukrainian Amateur Cup
  - Winner(s) (1): 2019–20
  - Runner(s)-up (1): 2020–21
- Poltava Oblast championship
  - Winner(s) (7): 2016, 2017, 2018, 2019, 2020, 2023, 2025
  - Runner(s)-up (1): 2022
- Poltava Oblast Cup
  - Winner(s) (9): 2014, 2015, 2016, 2017, 2018, 2020, 2022, 2023, 2024
  - Runner(s)-up (1): 2019
- Poltava Oblast Super Cup
  - Winner(s) (3): 2019, 2022, 2023
  - Runner(s)-up (5): 2014, 2015, 2016, 2017, 2018

== Players ==
=== Current squad ===
As of 2 August 2024

Note: Flags indicate national team as defined under FIFA eligibility rules; some limited exceptions apply. Players may hold more than one non-FIFA nationality.

No.	Pos.	Nation	Player
1	GK	UKR	Anatolii Tymofieiev
2	DF	UKR	Viacheslav Biriuk
4	MF	UKR	Vladyslav Alieksieienko
7	MF	UKR	Anatolii Sytnyk
10	MF	UKR	Vadym Burliai
11	MF	UKR	Olavale Fabunmi
12	GK	UKR	Yevhen Makarenko
15	DF	UKR	Yurii Pavlyk
16	MF	UKR	Oleksandr Ponomarenko
17	DF	UKR	Eduard Bohomaz
20	MF	UKR	Serhii Karetnyk
23	GK	UKR	Yaroslav Kostenko

No.	Pos.	Nation	Player
27	MF	UKR	Artem Onishchenko
28	MF	UKR	Ihor Koshman
33	DF	UKR	Bohdan Bychkov
77	MF	UKR	Denys Pochernin
78	MF	UKR	Valerii Lutsenko
88	DF	UKR	Yevhen Malyk
89	DF	UKR	Andrii Rudenko
96	DF	UKR	Oleksandr Braha
99	DF	UKR	Vladyslav Kovtun
—	GK	UKR	Mykhailo Pruhlo
—	MF	UKR	Yehor Kovalenko
—	MF	UKR	Estefano Sobol
