= Hennadiy Zhylkin =

Ukrainian footballer (born 1969)

Hennadiy Zhylkin Геннадій Жилкін
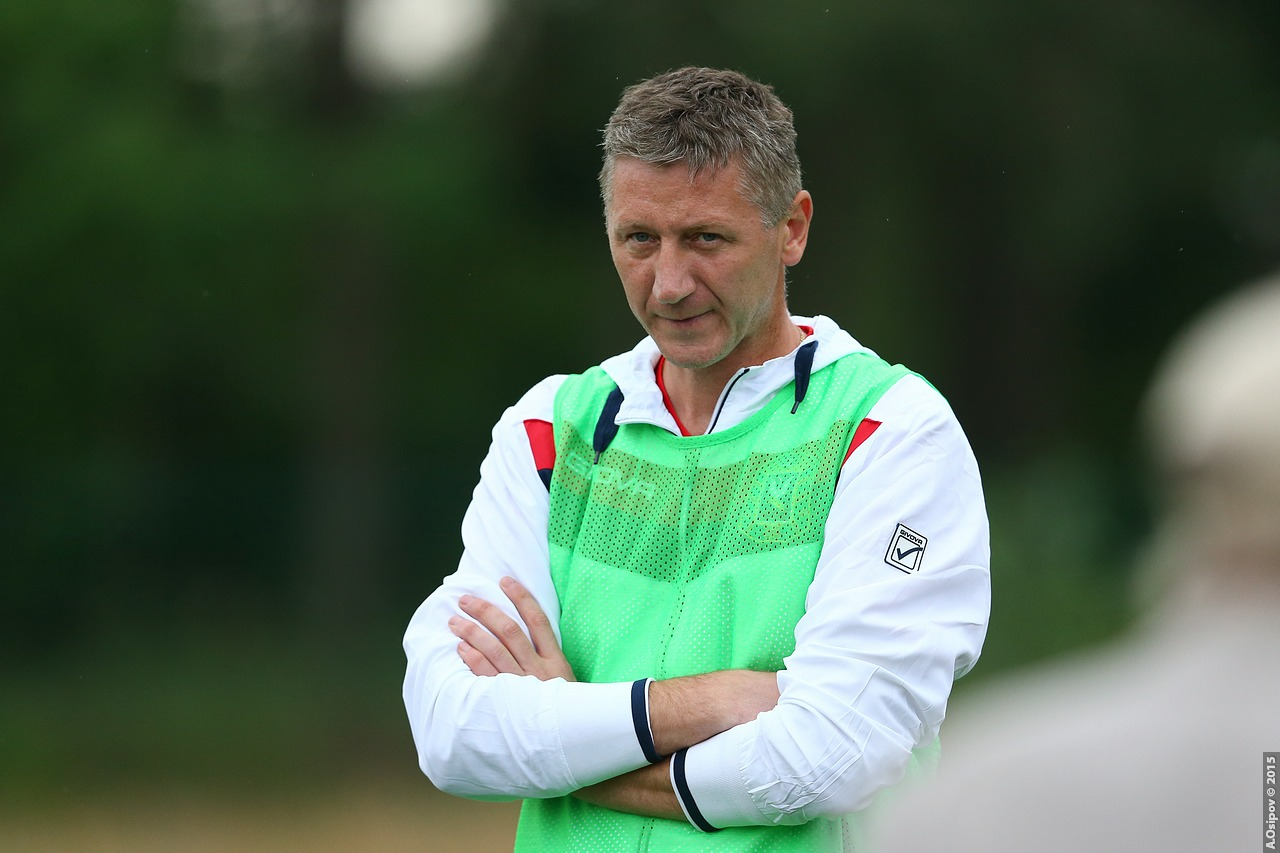

Personal information
- Full name: Hennadiy Volodymyrovych Zhylkin
- Date of birth: 3 August 1969 (age 57)
- Place of birth: Dnipropetrovsk, Ukrainian SSR
- Height: 1.89 m (6 ft 2 in)
- Position: Goalkeeper

Youth career
- 1986–1987: Dnipro Dnipropetrovsk

Senior career*
Years	Team	Apps	(Gls)
1988	SKA Odesa	4	(0)
1989	Tighina-RShVSM Bendery	12	(0)
1990–1991	Dnipro Dnipropetrovsk	0	(0)
1991	Kristall Kherson	38	(0)
1992	Torpedo Zaporizhzhia	1	(0)
1992–1993	Tavriya Kherson	17	(0)
1993	Karpaty Lviv	1	(0)
1993–1994	Maccabi Petah Tikva	2	(0)
1994	Dnipro Dnipropetrovsk	1	(0)
1994	Tavriya Simferopol	6	(0)
1995	Nyva Vinnytsia	14	(0)
1995	Chernomorets Novorossiysk	1	(0)
1995	Avanhard-Industriya Rovenky	5	(0)
1996	Arsenal Tula	4	(0)
1997	Lokomotiv Dnipropetrovsk	4	(0)
1997	Zirka Kirovohrad	10	(0)
1997	→ Zirka-2 Kirovohrad	7	(0)
1998	Metallurg Krasnoyarsk	30	(0)
1999	Druzhba Mahdalynivka		
2000–2001	Aktobe-Lento	13	(0)
2001	Kaisar	8	(0)
2002	Dinaburg Daugavpils	0	(0)
2003	Torpedo Zaporizhzhia	14	(0)
2003	Molodechno-2000	8	(0)
2004–2005	Torpedo-Kadino Mogilev	22	(0)
2006	Hirnyk Kryvyi Rih	2	(0)

Managerial career
- 2008–2009: Obolon Kyiv (assistant)
- 2010–2012: Kryvbas Kryvyi Rih (assistant)
- 2012–2013: Metalurh Donetsk (assistant)
- 2013–2014: Mordovia Saransk (assistant)
- * Club domestic league appearances and goals

Hennadiy Volodymyrovych Zhylkin (Ukrainian: Геннадій Володимирович Жилкін; born 3 August 1969) is a Ukrainian football coach and a former player who played as a goalkeeper.
