= Yuriy Tkachuk =

Ukrainian footballer

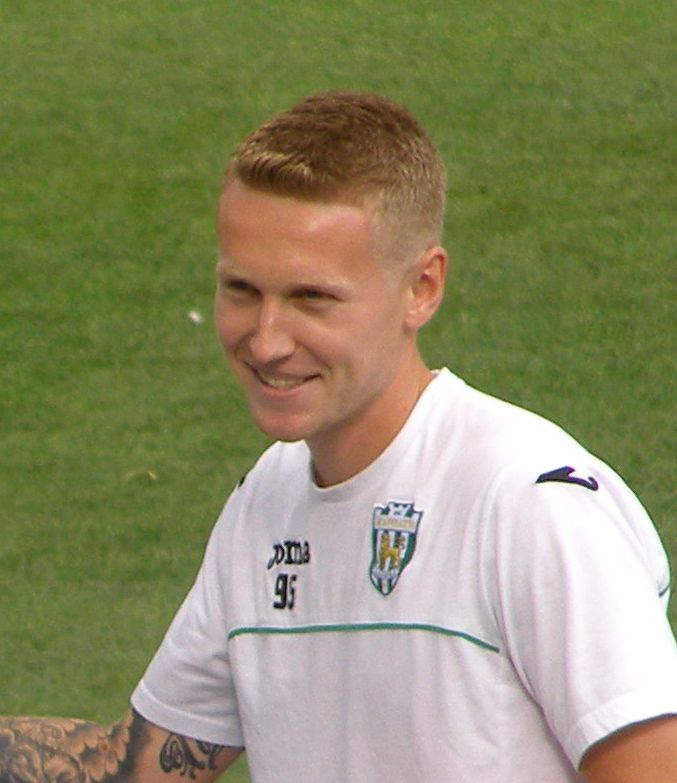
- Tkachuk with Karpaty Lviv in 2017

Personal information
- Full name: Yuriy Yuriyovych Tkachuk
- Date of birth: 18 April 1995 (age 31)
- Place of birth: Kelmentsi, Ukraine
- Height: 1.75 m (5 ft 9 in)
- Position: Midfielder

Team information
- Current team: ASD Soccer Trani

Youth career
- –2008: Youth School Kelmentsi
- 2008–2009: Monolit Illichivsk
- 2009–2011: Metalist Kharkiv

Senior career*
Years	Team	Apps	(Gls)
2011–2015	Metalist Kharkiv	7	(0)
2016	Atlético Madrid B	4	(0)
2016–2017	Melilla	14	(0)
2017–2018	Karpaty Lviv	2	(0)
2017	→ Rukh Vynnyky (loan)	11	(0)
2018	→ Levadia (loan)	31	(2)
2019–2020	Levadia	29	(1)
2021	Ventspils	11	(0)
2021–2022	Liepāja	26	(0)
2022–2023	Ursus Warsaw	5	(0)
2023–2024	Znicz Pruszków	42	(0)
2024–2025	Warta Poznań	32	(0)
2025–2026	Świt Szczecin	21	(0)
2026–	ASD Soccer Trani	0	(0)

International career
2010–2011	Ukraine U16	3	(0)
2010–2012	Ukraine U17	12	(2)
2012–2013	Ukraine U18	9	(1)
2013–2014	Ukraine U19	7	(0)
2014–2015	Ukraine U20	6	(1)
- * Club domestic league appearances and goals as of 18:58, 31 May 2026 (UTC)

Yuriy Yuriyovych Tkachuk (Ukrainian: Юрій Юрійович Ткачук; born 18 April 1995) is a Ukrainian professional footballer who plays as a midfielder for Italian club ASD Soccer Trani.

== Career ==
Born in Kelmentsi, Chernivtsi Oblast, Tkachuk is a product of the Metalist Kharkiv Youth School System. He made his Ukrainian Premier League debut for Metalist Kharkiv in the match against FC Sevastopol on 7 May 2014.

On 9 March 2016, Tkachuk signed for Atlético Madrid, being initially assigned to the reserves in Tercera División. On 30 August, he was loaned to Segunda División B side UD Melilla, for one year.

== Career statistics ==
As of match played 23 May 2026

Appearances and goals by club, season and competition
Club	Season	League			National cup (Note: Includes Ukrainian Cup, Estonian Cup, Latvian Cup, Polish Cup)		Europe		Other		Total	
Club	Season	Division	Apps	Goals	Apps	Goals	Apps	Goals	Apps	Goals	Apps	Goals
Metalist Kharkiv	2011–12	Ukrainian Premier League	0	0	0	0	0	0	—		0	0
Metalist Kharkiv	2013–14	Ukrainian Premier League	1	0	0	0	—		—		1	0
Metalist Kharkiv	2014–15	Ukrainian Premier League	3	0	3	0	2 (Note: Appearances in UEFA Europa League)	0	—		8	0
Metalist Kharkiv	2015–16	Ukrainian Premier League	3	0	0	0	—		—		3	0
Metalist Kharkiv	Total		7	0	3	0	2	0	—		12	0
Atlético Madrid B	2015–16	Tercera División	4	0	—		—		—		4	0
Melilla (loan)	2016–17	Segunda División B	14	0	—		—		—		14	0
Karpaty Lviv	2017–18	Ukrainian Premier League	2	0	—		—		—		2	0
Rukh Vynnyky (loan)	2017–18	Ukrainian First League	11	0	0	0	—		—		11	0
Levadia (loan)	2018	Meistriliiga	31	2	3	0	—		1 (Note: Appearance in Estonian Supercup)	0	35	2
Levadia	2019	Meistriliiga	28	1	3	0	2	0	1	0	34	1
Levadia	2020	Meistriliiga	1	0	1	0	—		—		2	0
Levadia	Total		60	3	7	0	2	0	2	0	71	3
Ventspils	2021	Latvian Higher League	11	0	0	0	—		—		11	0
Liepāja	2021	Latvian Higher League	12	0	3	0	4 (Note: Appearances in UEFA Europa Conference League)	0	—		19	0
Liepāja	2022	Latvian Higher League	14	0	0	0	—		—		14	0
Liepāja	Total		26	0	3	0	4	0	—		33	0
Ursus Warsaw	2022–23	III liga, group I	5	0	—		—		—		5	0
Znicz Pruszków	2022–23	II liga	14	0	—		—		—		14	0
Znicz Pruszków	2023–24	I liga	28	0	2	1	—		—		30	1
Znicz Pruszków	Total		42	0	2	1	—		—		44	1
Warta Poznań	2024–25	I liga	32	0	2	0	—		—		34	0
Świt Szczecin	2025–26	II liga	21	0	2	0	—		—		23	0
Career total			235	3	19	1	8	0	2	0	264	4

== Honours ==
Levadia

- Estonian Cup: 2017–18
- Estonian Supercup: 2018
