= Edmar (footballer, born 1980) =

Ukrainian footballer (born 1980)

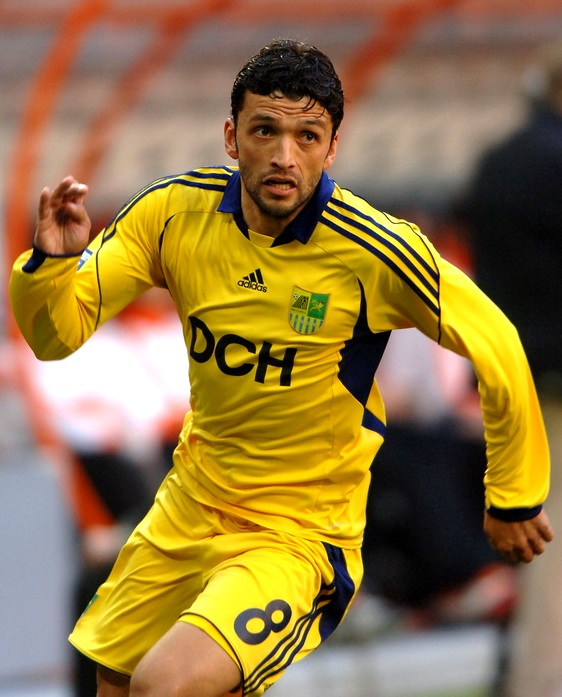
- Edmar playing for Metalist Kharkiv in 2011

Personal information
- Full name: Edmar Halovskyi de Lacerda
- Date of birth: 16 June 1980 (age 46)
- Place of birth: Mogi das Cruzes, Brazil
- Height: 1.77 m (5 ft 10 in)
- Position: Midfielder

Youth career
- 1995–1997: Independente de Limeira

Senior career*
Years	Team	Apps	(Gls)
1997–1999	Independente de Limeira	34	(10)
2000–2001	Etti Jundiaí	15	(2)
2001–2002	Internacional	30	(7)
2002–2007	Tavriya Simferopol	117	(18)
2007–2015	Metalist Kharkiv	189	(21)
2015–2016	Dnipro Dnipropetrovsk	10	(1)
2017	Boca Raton		
2017–2018	Metalist 1925 Kharkiv	13	(2)

International career
2011–2014	Ukraine	15	(1)

Managerial career
- 2022: Metalist 1925 Kharkiv (assistant)
- 2022–2023: Metalist 1925 Kharkiv (caretaker)
- 2024: FC Tobol (assistant)
- 2025–: Muras United
- 2025–: Kyrgyzstan U-23
- * Club domestic league appearances and goals

Edmar Galovskyi de Lacerda (né Edmar de Lacerda Aparecida; Ukrainian: Едмар Галовський де Ласерда; born 16 June 1980), simply known as Edmar, is a professional football coach and former player who is the head coach of the Kyrgyzstan national under-23 team. Born in Brazil, he was naturalized as a Ukrainian and played fifteen times for the Ukraine national team as a midfielder, scoring one goal.

== Playing career ==
=== Club ===
On 21 February 2017, Boca Raton announced the signing of Edmar.

=== International ===
Edmar made his debut for Ukraine on 10 August 2011, in a 0–1 loss against Sweden in a friendly match at his club ground in Kharkiv, replacing Ruslan Rotan for the final 17 minutes.

On 7 June 2013, his third cap, he made his first start in a 4–0 away win over Montenegro in qualification for the following year's World Cup. Edmar was one of nine Ukrainian players on 6 September to score in their 9–0 thrashing of San Marino at the Arena Lviv in another qualifier. On 15 November, he provided the pass to teammate Roman Zozulya for the first goal in a 2–0 victory over France, in the qualification play-off, although France won on aggregate.

== Personal life ==
He got married on 13 December 2008 in Simferopol to Ukrainian Tetiana Halovska, a native of Simferopol Raion.

As a naturalized Ukrainian citizen, on 20 July 2014, Edmar was called up to serve in the Armed Forces of Ukraine during the war in Donbas.

== Career statistics ==
Ukraine national team
Year	Apps	Goals
2011	1	0
2012	0	0
2013	8	1
2014	6	0
Total	15	1

Statistics accurate as of match played 12 October 2014

As of 9 September 2013

#	Date	Venue	Opponent	Score	Result	Competition	Ref
1.	9 September 2013	Arena Lviv, Lviv, Ukraine	San Marino	3–0	9–0	2014 FIFA World Cup Qualifier	
