= Volodymyr Shopin =

Ukrainian footballer

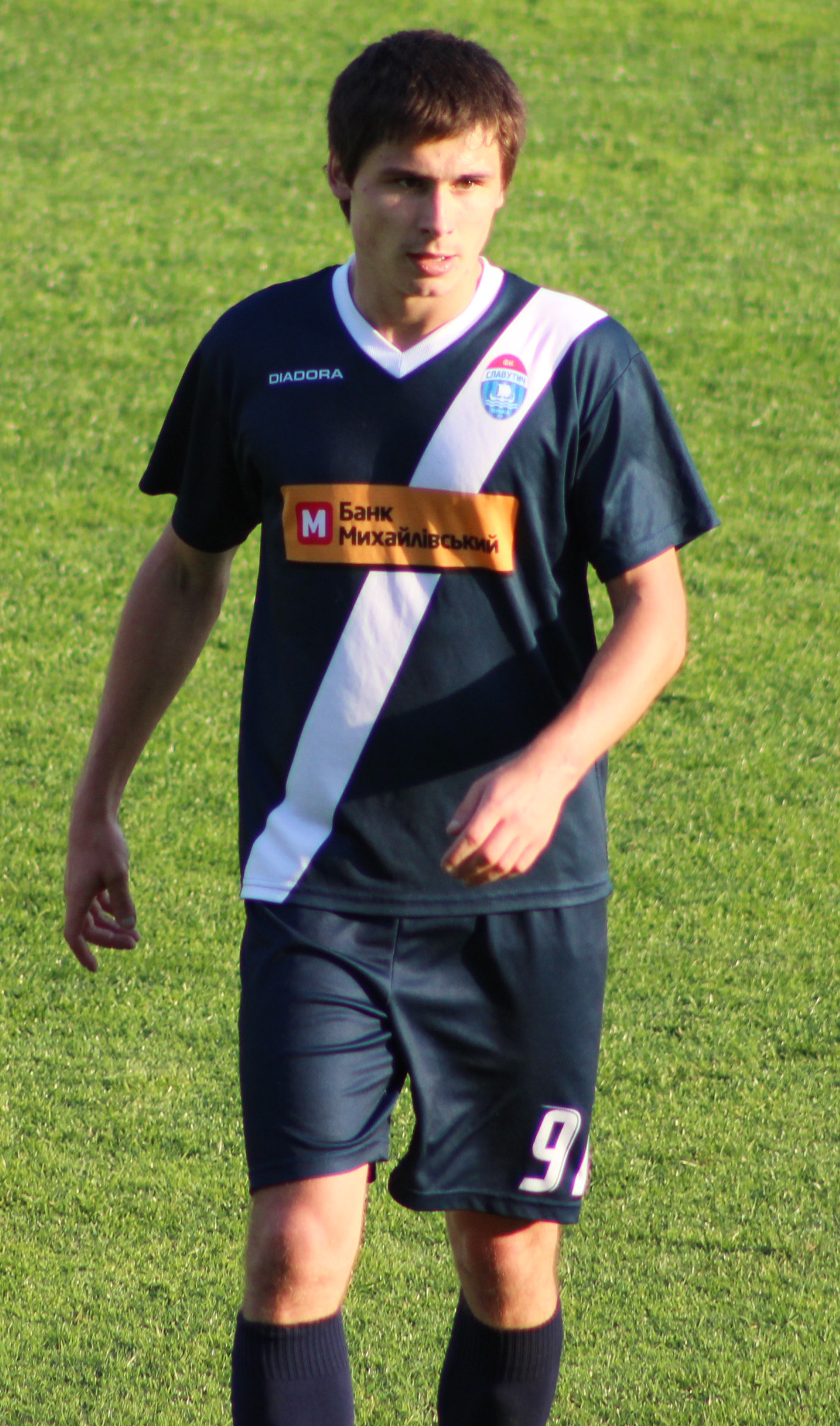

Personal information
- Full name: Volodymyr Vitaliyovych Shopin
- Date of birth: 9 May 1991 (age 35)
- Place of birth: Kharkiv, Ukraine
- Height: 1.81 m (5 ft 11 in)
- Position: Left-back

Team information
- Current team: Metalist Kharkiv
- Number: 27

Youth career
- 2004–2009: Metalist Kharkiv

Senior career*
Years	Team	Apps	(Gls)
2009–2014	Metalist Kharkiv	0	(0)
2014	→ Slavutych Cherkasy (loan)	9	(0)
2014–2017	Cherkaskyi Dnipro	71	(0)
2017–2018	Helios Kharkiv	32	(0)
2018	Mykolaiv	0	(0)
2018	Tavriya Simferopol	2	(0)
2019–2021	Hirnyk-Sport Horishni Plavni	48	(0)
2021–	Metalist Kharkiv	21	(0)
- * Club domestic league appearances and goals as of 11 May 2023

Volodymyr Vitaliyovych Shopin (Ukrainian: Володимир Віталійович Шопін; born 9 May 1991) is a Ukrainian professional footballer who plays as a left-back for Metalist Kharkiv.
