= Fininho =

Brazilian footballer (born 1983)

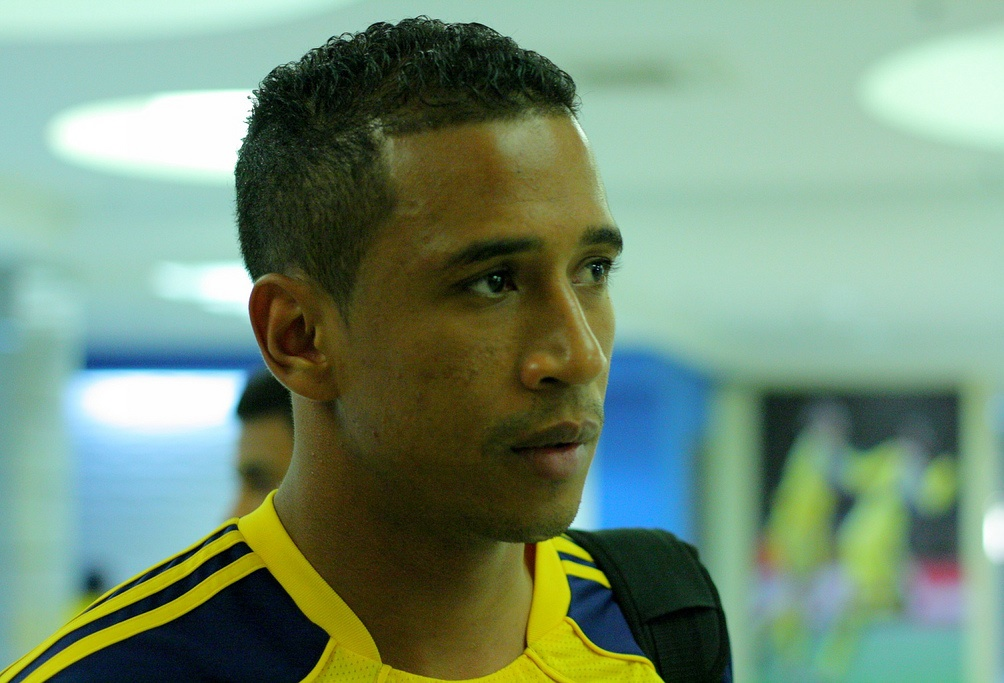
- Fininho with Metalist Kharkiv

Personal information
- Full name: Vinícius Aparecido Pereira de Santana Campos
- Date of birth: 3 November 1983 (age 43)
- Place of birth: São Paulo, Brazil
- Height: 1.80 m (5 ft 11 in)
- Positions: Full-back; winger

Team information
- Current team: Oeste (U20 manager)

Youth career
- Corinthians

Senior career*
Years	Team	Apps	(Gls)
2003–2006	Corinthians	8	(0)
2005	→ Vitória (loan)		
2005	→ Juventude (loan)	7	(0)
2006	→ Figueirense (loan)	15	(1)
2006–2009	Lokomotiv Moscow	43	(0)
2009	Sport Recife	11	(1)
2010–2013	Metalist Kharkiv	54	(7)
2013–2014	Goiás		
2014–2015	Madureira		

Managerial career
- 2022: São Caetano (U20)
- 2022–2023: Oeste (U20)
- * Club domestic league appearances and goals

Vinícius Aparecido Pereira de Santana Campos (born 3 November 1983), known as Fininho, is a Brazilian football coach and a former player. He was the manager of the Under-20 squad of Oeste.

== Club career ==
In 2010, Fininho signed with Metalist Kharkiv in Ukraine.

== Playing style ==
He had a trademark left-foot and was a specialist at long-shots, set-pieces and dribbles.

== Honours ==
Corinthians

- Campeonato Brasileiro: 2005

Figueirense

- Campeonato Catarinense: 2006

Lokomotiv Moscow

- Russian Cup: 2006–07
