= Yuriy Chonka =

Ukrainian footballer (1991–2026)

Personal information
- Full name: Yuriy Volodymyrovych Chonka
- Date of birth: 31 May 1991
- Place of birth: Velyka Kopanya, Zakarpattia Oblast, Ukrainian SSR, Soviet Union
- Date of death: 21 January 2026 (aged 34)
- Height: 1.70 m (5 ft 7 in)
- Position: Midfielder

Youth career
- 2006–2008: Youth Sport School Uzhhorod

Senior career*
| Years | Team | Apps | (Gls) |
| 2010 | Beregvidek Berehove (amateurs) | 0 | (0) |
| 2011–2012 | Metalist Kharkiv | 0 | (0) |
| 2013 | Naftan Novopolotsk | 31 | (0) |
| 2015 | Balmazújváros | 7 | (0) |
| 2015–2019 | Sevlyush Vynohradiv (amateurs) | 77 | (40) |
| 2020–2021 | Uzhhorod | 25 | (5) |
| 2021–? | Sevlyush Vynohradiv (amateurs) | 2 | (2) |
- * Club domestic league appearances and goals

Yuriy Volodymyrovych Chonka (Ukrainian: Юрій Володимирович Чонка; 31 May 1991 – 21 January 2026) was a Ukrainian professional footballer who played as a midfielder.

== Career ==
Chonka was awarded the title of best football player in Zakarpattia in 2010 among amateur teams.

On 16 February 2011, he signed a five-year contract with Metalist Kharkiv.

== Death ==
Chonka died on 21 January 2026, at the age of 34.
