= Serhiy Pshenychnykh =

Ukrainian footballer

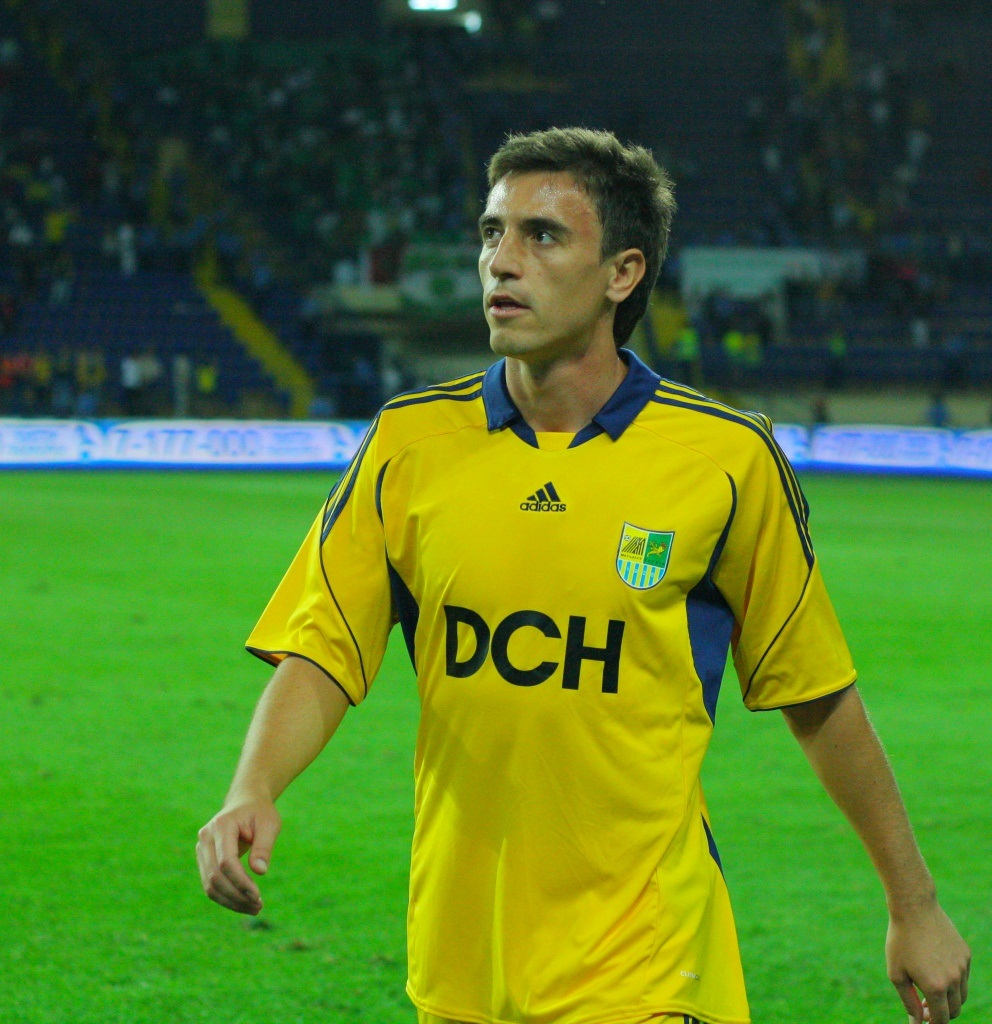

Personal information
- Date of birth: 19 November 1981 (age 44)
- Place of birth: Kharkiv, Ukrainian SSR
- Height: 1.82 m (6 ft 0 in)
- Position: Defender

Senior career*
Years	Team	Apps	(Gls)
2000–2003	Vorskla Poltava	43	(0)
2000–2002	→ Vorskla-2 Poltava	46	(6)
2003–2005	Opava	36	(2)
2005	Borysfen Boryspil	10	(0)
2005–2009	Karpaty Lviv	109	(3)
2009–2015	Metalist Kharkiv	97	(3)
2015–2016	Stal Dniprodzerzhynsk	18	(0)
- * Club domestic league appearances and goals as of 18 July 2015

Serhiy Mykolayovych Pshenychnykh (Ukrainian: Сергій Миколайович Пшеничних; born 19 November 1981) is a Ukrainian football defender.

== Career ==
He played for Metalist Kharkiv and Stal Dniprodzerzhynsk in the Ukrainian Premier League.
