= Shumerlya =

Shumerlya Шумерля
- Town

Other transcription(s)
  - Chuvash: Ҫӗмӗрле
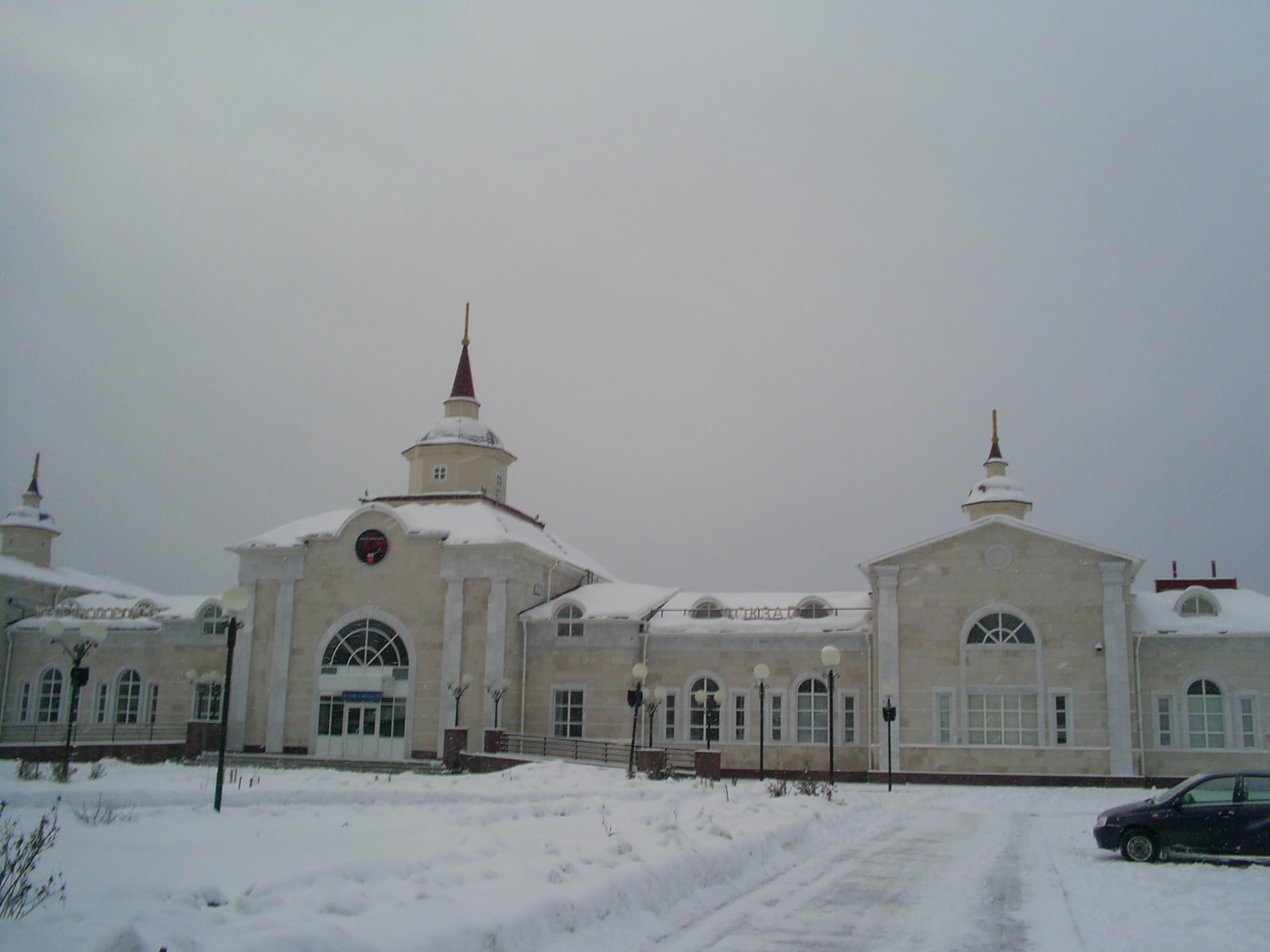
- Shumerlya railway station building

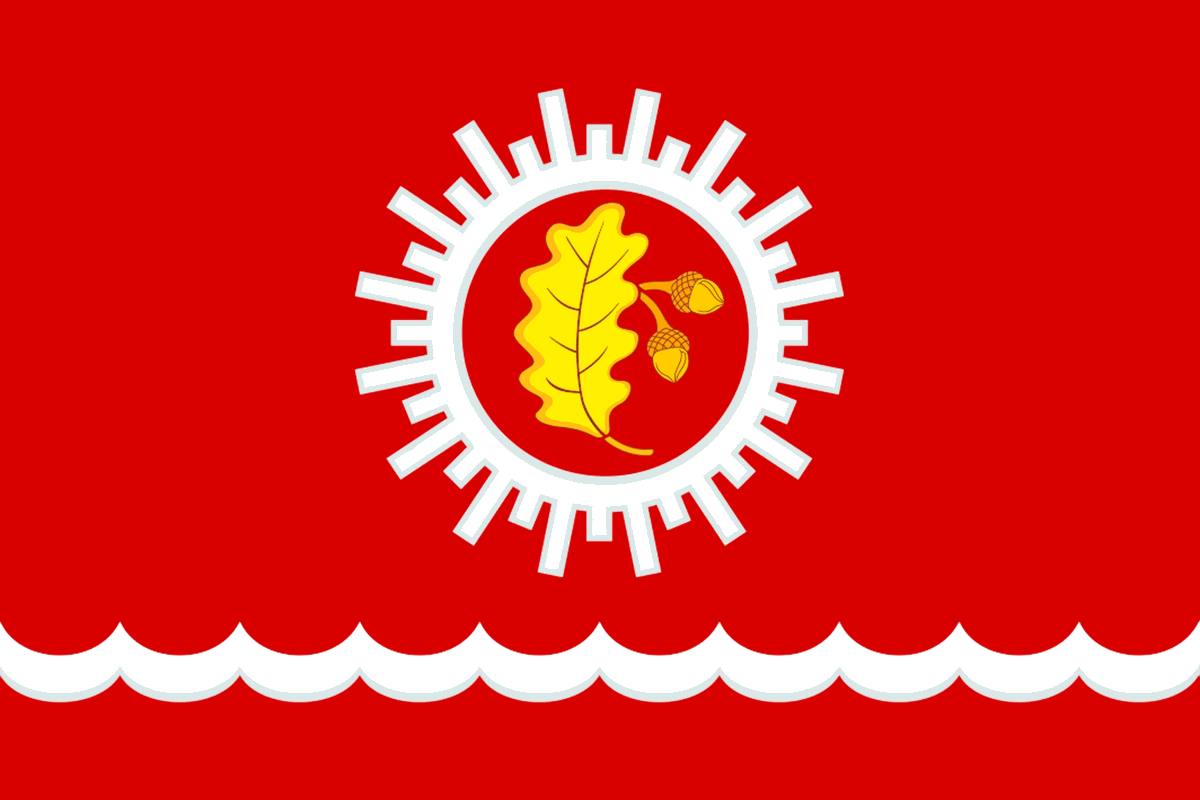
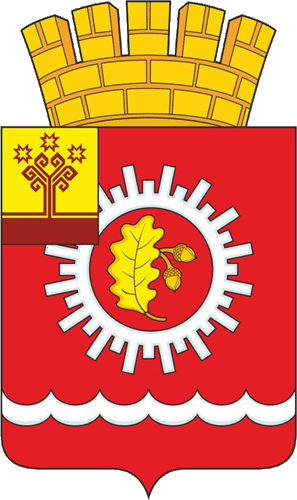
- Flag Coat of arms
- Interactive map of Shumerlya
- Location of Shumerlya Shumerlya (Chuvash Republic)
- Coordinates: 55°32′N 46°23′E
- Country: Russia
- Federal subject: Chuvashia
- Founded: 1916
- Town status since: 1937

Area
  - Total: 13.8 km^{2} (5.3 sq mi)
- Elevation: 100 m (330 ft)

Population (2010 Census)
  - Total: 31,722
  - Estimate (2021): 26,873 (−15.3%)
  - Density: 2,300/km^{2} (5,950/sq mi)

Administrative status
  - Subordinated to: Town of Shumerlya
  - Capital of: Town of Shumerlya, Shumerlinsky District

Municipal status
  - Urban okrug: Shumerlya Urban Okrug
  - Capital of: Shumerlya Urban Okrug, Shumerlinsky Municipal District
- Time zone: UTC+3 (MSK)
- Postal codes: 429120, 429122–429125, 429127, 429130, 429139
- OKTMO ID: 97713000001
- Website: gov.cap.ru/Default.aspx?gov_id=76

Shumerlya (Russian: Шу́мерля; Chuvash: Ҫӗмӗрле, Śĕmĕrle) is a town in the Chuvash Republic, Russia, located on the right bank of the Sura River on the Nizhny Novgorod–Ulyanovsk highway. Population: 31,722 (2010 census); 36,239 (2002 census); 41,986 (1989 Soviet census); 35,000 (1974).

== History ==
Founded in 1916, it was granted town status in 1937.

== Administrative and municipal status ==
Within the framework of administrative divisions, Shumerlya serves as the administrative center of Shumerlinsky District, even though it is not a part of it. As an administrative division, it is incorporated separately as the town of republic significance of Shumerlya—an administrative unit with the status equal to that of the districts. As a municipal division, the town of republic significance of Shumerlya is incorporated as Shumerlya Urban Okrug.

== Notable residents ==
- Serhiy Bashkyrov (born 1959), Soviet and Ukrainian football player and coach
