= Denys Barvinko =

Ukrainian footballer (1994–2021)

Personal information
- Full name: Denys Anatoliyovych Barvinko
- Date of birth: 16 February 1994
- Place of birth: Dnipropetrovsk, Ukraine
- Date of death: 10 September 2021 (aged 27)
- Place of death: Dnipro, Ukraine
- Height: 1.78 m (5 ft 10 in)
- Position: Left back

Youth career
- 2007–2009: Metalurh Zaporizhzhya
- 2011: Metalist Kharkiv

Senior career*
Years	Team	Apps	(Gls)
2011–2014	Metalist Kharkiv	7	(0)
2015	VPK Ahro Mahdalynivka (amateur)	0	(0)

International career
2012	Ukraine-18	3	(0)
2012	Ukraine-19	2	(0)
2012	Ukraine-20	1	(0)
- * Club domestic league appearances and goals

Denys Barvinko (Ukrainian: Денис Анатолійович Барвінко; 16 February 1994 – 10 September 2021) was a Ukrainian professional footballer who played as a left-back for FC Metalist Kharkiv in the Ukrainian Premier League.

== Career ==
Barvinko emerged from the FC Metalurh Zaporizhya and Metalist Kharkiv Youth School Systems. On 1 April 2012, he made his debut in the Ukrainian Premier League for Metalist in a 1–1 draw with Kryvbas Kryvyi Rih, in which he assisted the equalizing goal scored by Marlos. Despite initial success, Barvinko retired from playing at the age of just 20 due to recurring injuries, and took up a coaching role.

In September 2021, he was admitted into hospital with hyperglycemia. As his condition worsened, he slipped into coma and died on 10 September 2021.
