= Andriy Berezovchuk =

Ukrainian footballer

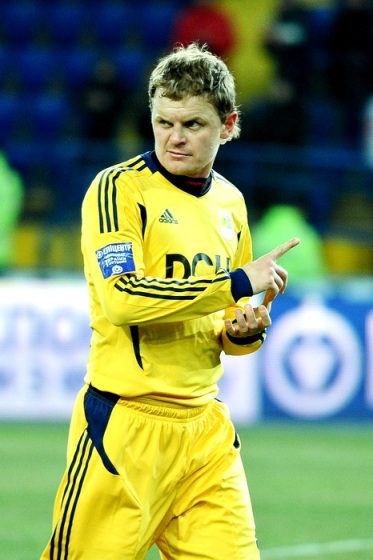

Personal information
- Full name: Andriy Volodymyrovych Berezovchuk
- Date of birth: 16 April 1981 (age 45)
- Place of birth: Mykolaiv, Ukrainian SSR, Soviet Union
- Height: 1.79 m (5 ft 10 1/2 in)
- Position: Defender

Senior career*
Years	Team	Apps	(Gls)
1998–2001	FC Mykolaiv	65	(2)
2001–2005	Metalist Kharkiv	73	(3)
2002–2003	→ Metalist-2 Kharkiv	2	(0)
2005–2008	Kharkiv	82	(4)
2008	Metalurh Donetsk	11	(0)
2009–2015	Metalist Kharkiv	66	(3)
Medal record
Men's football
Representing Ukraine
UEFA European Under-18 Championship
Runner-up	2000 Germany
- * Club domestic league appearances and goals

Andriy Volodymyrovych Berezovchuk (Ukrainian: Андрій Володимирович Березовчук; born 16 April 1981) is a retired professional Ukrainian football defender who last played for Metalist Kharkiv in the Ukrainian Premier League.
