= Artur Denchuk =

Ukrainian footballer

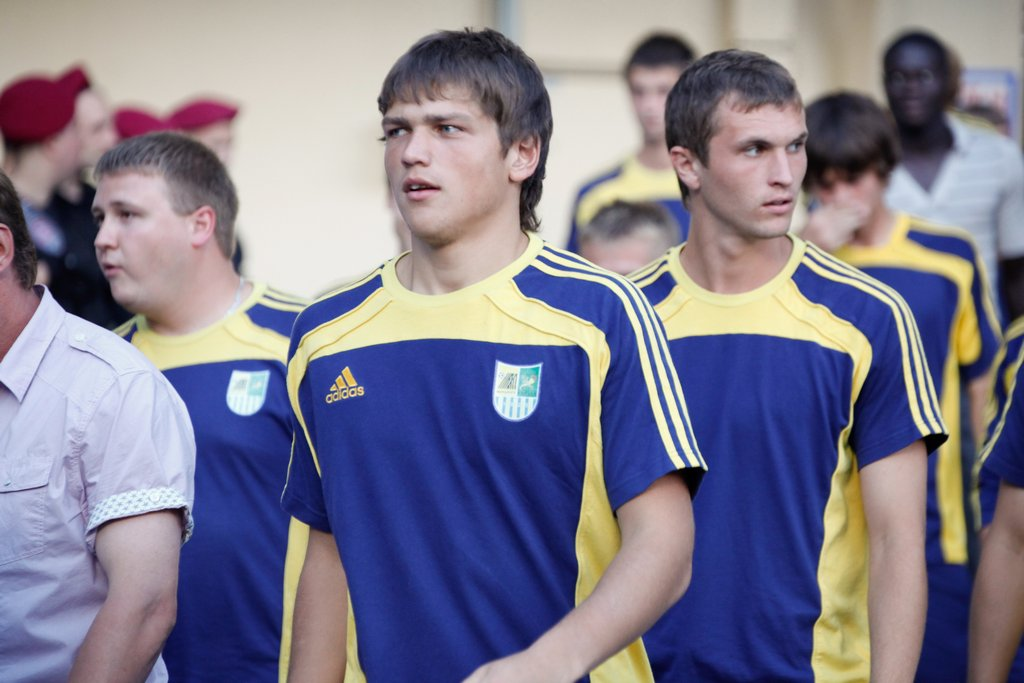

Personal information
- Full name: Artur Ihorovych Denchuk
- Date of birth: 3 April 1992 (age 34)
- Place of birth: Kharkiv, Ukraine
- Height: 1.85 m (6 ft 1 in)
- Position: Goalkeeper

Team information
- Current team: Peremoha Dnipro (on loan from Metalist Kharkiv)

Youth career
- 1999–2008: Metalist Kharkiv

Senior career*
| Years | Team | Apps | (Gls) |
| 2008–2015 | Metalist Kharkiv | 0 | (0) |
| 2014 | → Sumy (loan) | 4 | (0) |
| 2015 | Helios Kharkiv | 4 | (0) |
| 2016 | Metalist Kharkiv | 0 | (0) |
| 2016–2020 | Avanhard Kramatorsk | 114 | (0) |
| 2020– | Metalist Kharkiv | 11 | (0) |
| 2022– | → Peremoha Dnipro (loan) | 0 | (0) |

International career^{‡}
| 2009–2010 | Ukraine U18 | 3 | (0) |
| 2010–2011 | Ukraine U19 | 7 | (0) |
| 2012 | Ukraine U20 | 2 | (0) |
| 2013 | Ukraine U21 | 5 | (0) |
- * Club domestic league appearances and goals as of 11 February 2022 ‡ National team caps and goals as of 17 August 2016

Artur Ihorovych Denchuk (Ukrainian: Артур Ігорович Денчук; born 3 April 1992) is a Ukrainian professional footballer who plays as a goalkeeper for Peremoha Dnipro on loan from Metalist Kharkiv.

== International career ==
He played for different Ukrainian youth national teams.
