= 2014–15 FC Dnipro Dnipropetrovsk season =

Dnipro Dnipropetrovsk
2014–15 season
- Manager: Myron Markevych
- Ukrainian Premier League: 3rd
- Ukrainian Cup: Semi-finals
- UEFA Champions League: Third qualifying round
- UEFA Europa League: Runners-up
- Top goalscorer: League: Nikola Kalinić (12); All: Nikola Kalinić (19)
Home colours	Away colours

During the 2014–15 season, FC Dnipro Dnipropetrovsk competed in the Ukrainian Premier League, Ukrainian Cup, UEFA Champions League and UEFA Europa League.

== Season summary ==
Dnipro reached the Europa League final, only to be defeated by a Sevilla side in the middle of three consecutive Europa League wins.

== Players ==
=== First-team squad ===
Squad at end of season

Note: Flags indicate national team as defined under FIFA eligibility rules; some limited exceptions apply. Players may hold more than one non-FIFA nationality.

No.	Pos.	Nation	Player
1	GK	UKR	Oleksiy Bashtanenko
2	DF	ROU	Alexandru Vlad
3	DF	CZE	Ondřej Mazuch
4	MF	UKR	Serhiy Kravchenko
5	DF	UKR	Vitaliy Mandzyuk
7	MF	GEO	Jaba Kankava
8	MF	UKR	Pavlo Ksyonz (loaned from Karpaty Lviv)
9	FW	CRO	Nikola Kalinić
10	MF	UKR	Yevhen Konoplyanka
11	FW	UKR	Yevhen Seleznyov
12	DF	BRA	Léo Matos
14	DF	UKR	Yevhen Cheberyachko
15	DF	UKR	Dmytro Chyhrynskyi
16	GK	CZE	Jan Laštůvka
17	FW	UKR	Denys Balanyuk
18	FW	UKR	Roman Zozulya
19	MF	UKR	Roman Bezus
20	MF	POR	Bruno Gama

No.	Pos.	Nation	Player
21	MF	CRO	Mladen Bartulović
22	FW	UKR	Yevhen Bokhashvili
23	DF	BRA	Douglas
24	MF	UKR	Valeriy Luchkevych
25	MF	UKR	Valeriy Fedorchuk
27	MF	UKR	Oleksandr Vasylyev
28	MF	UKR	Yevhen Shakhov
29	MF	UKR	Ruslan Rotan
30	DF	SEN	Papa Gueye
39	DF	UKR	Oleksandr Svatok
44	DF	UKR	Artem Fedetskyi
47	MF	UKR	Serhiy Horbunov
71	GK	UKR	Denys Boyko
77	GK	UKR	Denys Shelikhov
90	MF	UKR	Oleksandr Mihunov
96	MF	UKR	Maksym Tretyakov
97	FW	UKR	Andriy Bliznichenko
99	FW	BRA	Matheus

=== Left club during season ===
Note: Flags indicate national team as defined under FIFA eligibility rules; some limited exceptions apply. Players may hold more than one non-FIFA nationality.

No.	Pos.	Nation	Player
6	DF	BRA	Egídio (contract terminated)
8	DF	UKR	Volodymyr Polyovyi (loaned to Volyn Lutsk)
17	DF	CRO	Ivan Strinić (to Napoli)

No.	Pos.	Nation	Player
89	MF	UKR	Serhiy Politylo (loaned to Volyn Lutsk)
91	GK	UKR	Ihor Vartsaba (loaned to Naftovyk-Ukrnafta)

== Competitions ==
=== Overview ===
Competition	First match	Last match	Starting round	Final position	Record							
Competition	First match	Last match	Starting round	Final position	Pld	W	D	L	GF	GA	GD	Win %
Ukrainian Premier League	25 July 2014	30 May 2015	Matchday 1	3rd	26	16	6	4	47	17	+30	61.54
Ukrainian Cup	23 August 2014	20 May 2015	Round of 32	Semi-finals	7	4	1	2	11	3	+8	57.14
UEFA Champions League	30 July 2014	6 August 2014	Third qualifying round	Third qualifying round	2	0	1	1	0	2	−2	0.00
UEFA Europa League	20 August 2014	27 May 2015	Play-off round	Runners-up	17	7	5	5	17	14	+3	41.18
Total					52	27	13	12	75	36	+39	51.92

Source: Competitions

=== Ukrainian Premier League ===
==== League table ====
Pos	Team	Pld	W	D	L	GF	GA	GD	Pts	Qualification or relegation
1	Dynamo Kyiv (C)	26	20	6	0	65	12	+53	66	Qualification for the Champions League group stage
2	Shakhtar Donetsk	26	17	5	4	71	21	+50	56	Qualification for the Champions League third qualifying round
3	Dnipro Dnipropetrovsk	26	16	6	4	47	17	+30	54	Qualification for the Europa League group stage (Note: Since winners of 2014–15 Ukrainian Cup, Dynamo Kyiv, qualified for the 2015–16 UEFA Champions League, the place in the Europa League group stage for the cup winner will be given to the third-placed team and the spots to Europa League third qualifying round will be given to the fourth-placed and fifth-placed teams.)
4	Zorya Luhansk (Note: Zorya Luhansk were initially deducted a total of 3 points on decision of the FFU Control Disciplinary Committee on 18 February 2015, but the decision was reversed and the FFU reinstated the three points to Zorya Luhansk. (17 June 2015))	26	13	6	7	40	31	+9	45	Qualification for the Europa League third qualifying round
5	Vorskla Poltava	26	11	9	6	35	22	+13	42	Qualification for the Europa League third qualifying round

Source: uafootball.net.ua
Rules for classification: 1) points; 2) goal difference; 3) goals scored; 4) head-to-head points; 5) head-to-head goal difference; 6) head-to-head goals scored; 7) fair play rating
(C) Champions

==== Results summary ====
Overall								Home						Away					
Pld	W	D	L	GF	GA	GD	Pts	W	D	L	GF	GA	GD	W	D	L	GF	GA	GD
26	16	6	4	47	17	+30	54	7	4	2	24	11	+13	9	2	2	23	6	+17

Source: Competitions

==== Results by round ====
Round	1	2	3	4	5	6	7	8	9	10	11	12	13	14	15	16	17	18	19	20	21	22	23	24	25	26
Ground	A	A	H	A	H	A	H	A	H	A	H	A	H	H	H	A	H	A	H	A	H	A	H	A	H	A
Result	W	W	W	W	D	W	W	W	W	L	L	D	D	D	W	W	W	W	D	W	W	W	L	L	W	D
Position	3	2	1	2	2	2	1	1	1	2	2	2	3	3	3	3	3	3	3	3	3	2	3	3	3	3

Source: Matches
A = Away; H = Home; W = Win; D = Draw; L = Loss

==== Matches ====
25 July 2014 1	Metalurh Donetsk	0–2	Dnipro Dnipropetrovsk	Lviv
19:00 EEST (UTC+3)	Checher (yellow card) 63'; Makrides (yellow card) 82'; da Silva (penalty missed) 90+1'	Report	Matheus (yellow card) 60', (goal) 71' (pen.); Konoplyanka 64'; Douglas (yellow card) 90'	Stadium: Arena Lviv; Attendance: 7,527; Referee: Yevhen Aranovskyi

2 August 2014 2	Volyn Lutsk	0–1	Dnipro Dnipropetrovsk	Lutsk
19:30 EEST (UTC+3)	Shabanov (yellow card) 65'; Celin (yellow card) 90+3'	Report	Shakhov 85'; Seleznyov (yellow card) 87'; Konoplyanka (yellow card) 90'	Stadium: Avanhard Stadium; Attendance: 5,500; Referee: Viktor Shvetsov

10 August 2014 3	Dnipro Dnipropetrovsk	4–0	Karpaty Lviv	Dnipropetrovsk
19:30 EEST (UTC+3)	Fedetskyi (yellow card) 17'; Gama 47'; Shakhov 65', 75'; Kalinić 83'	Report	Chachua (yellow card) 22'; Kozhanov (yellow card) 54'	Stadium: Dnipro Arena; Attendance: 12,668; Referee: Sergey Lysenchuk

15 August 2014 4	Metalurh Zaporizhzhia	0–1	Dnipro Dnipropetrovsk	Zaporizhzhia
21:00 EEST (UTC+3)	Balić (yellow card) 53'; Yusov (yellow card) 78'	Report	Rotan (yellow card) 12'; Mazuch (yellow card) 57'; Fedetskyi 59'	Stadium: Slavutych Arena; Attendance: 10,000; Referee: Dmitriy Kutakov

31 August 2014 5	Dnipro Dnipropetrovsk	1–1	Vorskla Poltava	Dnipropetrovsk
19:30 EEST (UTC+3)	Kalinić 49' (pen.); Gama (yellow card) 55'; Shakhov (yellow card) 57'; Kankava (yellow card) 65'	Report	Barannik 45+1'; Chesnakov (yellow card) 58'; Sapay (yellow card) 62'; Bohush (yellow card) 81'	Stadium: Dnipro Arena; Attendance: 14,645; Referee: Oleksandr Derdo

13 September 2014 6	Metalist Kharkiv	2–5	Dnipro Dnipropetrovsk	Kharkiv
17:00 EEST (UTC+3)	Coelho (yellow card) 45'; Villagra (red card) 54'; Bolbat 64'; Torsiglieri (yellow card) 86'; Xavier 90+6'	Report	Gama 14', 43', 63'; Kankava (yellow card) 35'; Fedetskyi (yellow card) 53'; Strinić (yellow card) 73'; Douglas (yellow card) 84'; Seleznyov 88'; Politylo (yellow card) 90+2'; Konoplyanka 90+3'	Stadium: OSC Metalist; Attendance: 21,564; Referee: Viktor Shvetsov

22 September 2014 7	Dnipro Dnipropetrovsk	5–0	Olimpik Donetsk	Dnipropetrovsk
21:00 EEST (UTC+3)	Seleznyov 9'; Kravchenko (yellow card) 42'; Gama 49'; Kankava (yellow card) 65'; Sytnik 75' (o.g.); Kalinić 76', 89', (yellow card) 80'	Report	Ohirya (yellow card) 28'	Stadium: Dnipro Arena; Attendance: 9,142; Referee: Yuriy Vaks

5 October 2014 8	Illichivets Mariupol	0–1	Dnipro Dnipropetrovsk	Dnipropetrovsk
14:00 EEST (UTC+3)	Tsyupa (yellow card) 13'; Hryn (yellow card) 29' (yellow-red card) 73'; Oberemko (yellow card) 58'; Kulach (yellow card) 59'	Report	Douglas (red card) 22'; Seleznyov 40'; Luchkevych (yellow card) 68'	Stadium: Meteor Stadium; Attendance: 8,000; Referee: Yaroslav Kozyk

19 October 2014 9	Dnipro Dnipropetrovsk	2–1	Chornomorets Odesa	Dnipropetrovsk
19:30 EEST (UTC+3)	Kalinić 37', 66'	Report	Bobko 20'; Kutas (yellow card) 60'; Fomin (yellow card) 87'	Stadium: Dnipro Arena; Attendance: 12,830; Referee: Kostiantyn Trukhanov

2 November 2014 11	Dnipro Dnipropetrovsk	0–3	Dynamo Kyiv	Dnipropetrovsk
19:30 EET (UTC+2)	Rotan (yellow card) 33' (yellow-red card) 85'; Strinić (yellow card) 44'; Zozulya (yellow card) 83'	Report	Lens 28'; Rybalka (yellow card) 35'; Yarmolenko 40', (yellow card) 68'; Silva (yellow card) 43'; Sydorchuk (yellow card) 64'; Kravets 83'	Stadium: Dnipro Arena; Attendance: 22,609; Referee: Viktor Shvetsov

9 November 2014 12	Shakhtar Donetsk	0–0	Dnipro Dnipropetrovsk	Lviv
17:00 EET (UTC+2)	Ordets (yellow card) 42'; Fred (yellow card) 66'	Report	Zozulya (yellow card) 45'; Konoplyanka (yellow card) 53'; Mazuch (yellow card) 55'; Fedetskyi (yellow card) 74'; Bartulović (red card) 87'	Stadium: Arena Lviv; Attendance: 22,417; Referee: Anatoliy Abdula

22 November 2014 13	Dnipro Dnipropetrovsk	1–1	Hoverla Uzhhorod	Dnipropetrovsk
17:00 EET (UTC+2)	Kalinić (yellow card) 36' (yellow-red card) 83', (goal) 57'	Report	Kacharaba (yellow card) 40'; Khomyn (yellow card) 58'; Kaverin 60'	Stadium: Dnipro Arena; Attendance: 5,507; Referee: Anatoliy Zhabchenko

1 December 2014 14	Dnipro Dnipropetrovsk	1–1	Metalurh Donetsk	Dnipropetrovsk
19:00 EET (UTC+2)	Konoplyanka 16'; Douglas (yellow card) 46'; Seleznyov (yellow card) 71'; Rotan (yellow card) 88'	Report	Moraes 11'; Sobol (yellow card) 23'; Noyok (yellow card) 77'	Stadium: Dnipro Arena; Attendance: 1,250; Referee: Yaroslav Kozyk

6 December 2014 10	Zorya Luhansk	2–1	Dnipro Dnipropetrovsk	Zaporizhzhia
17:00 EET (UTC+2)	Hrytsay (yellow card) 38'; Budkivskyi 51'; Segbefia (yellow card) 62', (goal) 87'; Vernydub (yellow card) 77'	Report	Rotan (yellow card) 50'; Kalinić (yellow card) 68'; Konoplyanka 90'	Stadium: Slavutych Arena; Attendance: 1,200; Referee: Viktor Shvetsov
Note: The matches of the 10th round was postponed due to Directors of the UPL decision.

1 March 2015 15	Dnipro Dnipropetrovsk	5–0	Volyn Lutsk	Dnipropetrovsk
17:00 EET (UTC+2)	Konoplyanka 17'; Fedorchuk (yellow card) 23'; Gama (yellow card) 43'; Ksyonz 45+3'; Kalinić 50'; Bliznichenko 81'; Zozulya 90+4'	Report	Petrov (yellow card) 33'; Babatunde (yellow card) 36'; Politylo (yellow card) 56'	Stadium: Dnipro Arena; Attendance: 9,379; Referee: Anatoliy Zhabchenko

8 March 2015 16	Karpaty Lviv	0–1	Dnipro Dnipropetrovsk	Lviv
19:30 EET (UTC+2)	Holodyuk (yellow card) 44'	Report	Kalinić 4'; Chyhrynskyi (yellow card) 51'; Kankava (yellow card) 81'	Stadium: Ukraina Stadium; Attendance: 5,530; Referee: Anatoliy Abdula

15 March 2015 17	Dnipro Dnipropetrovsk	1–0	Metalurh Zaporizhzhia	Dnipropetrovsk
17:00 EET (UTC+2)	Shakhov (yellow card) 32'; Luchkevych 75'	Report	Orelesi (yellow card) 17'; Lyopa (yellow card) 43'; Pashayev (yellow card) 64'; Kulach (yellow card) 67'	Stadium: Dnipro Arena; Attendance: 10,177; Referee: Sergey Lysenchuk

4 April 2015 18	Vorskla Poltava	1–3	Dnipro Dnipropetrovsk	Poltava
17:00 EEST (UTC+3)	Tursunov 13'; Siminin (yellow card) 29'; Shynder (yellow card) 73'; Sapay (yellow card) 86'; Dedechko (yellow card) 88'	Report	Seleznyov 2', 45+2', (yellow card) 37'; Cheberyachko (yellow card) 84'; Boyko (yellow card) 90+1'; Gueye (yellow card) 90+2'; Konoplyanka 90+6'	Stadium: Vorskla Stadium; Attendance: 5,500; Referee: Yuriy Moseychuk

11 April 2015 19	Dnipro Dnipropetrovsk	0–0	Metalist Kharkiv	Dnipropetrovsk
19:30 EEST (UTC+3)	Fedetskyi (yellow card) 90+4'	Report	Selin (yellow card) 63'; Ryzhuk (yellow card) 85'; Byesyedin (yellow card) 87'	Stadium: Dnipro Arena; Attendance: 13,650; Referee: Yuriy Mozharovskyi

19 April 2015 20	Olimpik Donetsk	0–5	Dnipro Dnipropetrovsk	Kyiv
14:00 EEST (UTC+3)		Report	Bliznichenko 15'; Seleznyov 26' (pen.), 45'; Konoplyanka 68'; Kalinić 77'	Stadium: Bannikov Stadium; Attendance: 1,000; Referee: Kostiantyn Trukhanov

26 April 2015 21	Dnipro Dnipropetrovsk	1–0	Illichivets Mariupol	Dnipropetrovsk
17:00 EEST (UTC+3)	Bliznichenko 15'	Report	Matvyeyev (yellow card) 55'	Stadium: Dnipro Arena; Attendance: 8,876; Referee: Sergey Lysenchuk

3 May 2015 22	Chornomorets Odesa	0–3	Dnipro Dnipropetrovsk	Dnipropetrovsk
19:30 EEST (UTC+3)	Hrechyshkin (yellow card) 14'; Vasin (yellow card) 58'; Kabayev (yellow card) 67'	Report	Kalinić 32', 44' (pen.); Vlad (yellow card) 51'; Fedorchuk (yellow card) 75'; Seleznyov 76'	Stadium: Dnipro Arena; Attendance: 3,938; Referee: Yaroslav Kozyk

10 May 2015 23	Dnipro Dnipropetrovsk	0–2	Zorya Luhansk	Dnipropetrovsk
19:30 EEST (UTC+3)	Gama (yellow card) 9'	Report	Khomchenovskyi 27'; Chaykovskyi (yellow card) 27'; Budkivskyi 43'; Malinovskyi (yellow card) 62'	Stadium: Dnipro Arena; Attendance: 11,507; Referee: Anatoliy Abdula

17 May 2015 24	Dynamo Kyiv	1–0	Dnipro Dnipropetrovsk	Kyiv
19:30 EEST (UTC+3)	Sydorchuk (yellow card) 60'; Vida 84', (yellow card) 87'	Report	Bezus (yellow card) 16'; Mihunov (yellow card) 90+2'	Stadium: NSC Olimpiyskiy; Attendance: 50,702; Referee: Anatoliy Zhabchenko

23 May 2015 25	Dnipro Dnipropetrovsk	3–2	Shakhtar Donetsk	Dnipropetrovsk
18:00 EEST (UTC+3)	Matheus 23'; Shakhov (yellow card) 41'; Bezus 64', (yellow card) 69'; Luchkevych 81'	Report	Teixeira 8', 27', (yellow card) 38'; Ilsinho (yellow card) 36'; Stepanenko (yellow card) 45+3'; Fred (yellow card) 48'; Rakytskiy (yellow card) 70' (yellow-red card) 90+4'; Wellington Nem (yellow card) 80'	Stadium: Dnipro Arena; Attendance: 17,444; Referee: Yuriy Vaks

30 May 2015 26	Hoverla Uzhhorod	0–0	Dnipro Dnipropetrovsk	Uzhhorod
19:30 EEST (UTC+3)	Trukhin (yellow card) 87'; Koval (yellow card) 90+2'; Raičević (yellow card) 90+5'	Report	Bliznichenko (yellow card) 12'	Stadium: Avanhard Stadium; Attendance: 4,100; Referee: Oleksandr Ivanov

=== Ukrainian Cup ===
23 August 2014 Round of 32	Desna Chernihiv	0–1	Dnipro Dnipropetrovsk	Chernihiv
17:00 EEST (UTC+3)	Melnyk (yellow card) 26'	Report	Cheberyachko 36'; Bartulović (yellow card) 72'; Fedetskyi (yellow card) 76'; Polyovyi (yellow card) 90+1'	Stadium: Yuri Gagarin Stadium; Attendance: 7,100; Referee: Andrey Yablonsky

Round of 16
The second leg was originally scheduled for 30 October 2014, but was moved to an earlier date.

27 September 2014 First leg	Volyn Lutsk	1–0	Dnipro Dnipropetrovsk	Lutsk
17:00 EEST (UTC+3)	Bicfalvi 37' (pen.); Siminin (yellow card) 54'; Fedorchuk (yellow card) 63'; Memeshev (yellow card) 78'; Shabanov (yellow card) 87'	Report	Bartulović (yellow card) 14'; Douglas (yellow card) 45'; Fedetskyi (yellow card) 66'; Kalinić (yellow card) 73'	Stadium: Avanhard Stadium; Attendance: 6,100; Referee: Yevhen Aranovskyi

27 October 2014 Second leg	Dnipro Dnipropetrovsk	4–0 (4–1 agg.)	Volyn Lutsk	Dnipropetrovsk
19:00 EET (UTC+2)	Cheberyachko 37'; Luchkevych (yellow card) 45+2'; Rotan 57'; Seleznyov 72'; Kalinić 87'	Report	Žunić (yellow card) 57'; Fedorchuk (yellow card) 74'	Stadium: Dnipro Arena; Attendance: 5,613; Referee: Dmytro Kulakov
Note: Dnipro Dnipropetrovsk won 4–1 on aggregate.

Quarter-finals
The first leg was originally scheduled for 4 March 2015, but was postponed.

1 April 2015 First leg	Chornomorets Odesa	0–4	Dnipro Dnipropetrovsk	Kyiv
19:00 EEST (UTC+3)		Report	Shakhov (yellow card) 45+1'; Rotan 52'; Seleznyov 56' (pen.), 86'; Douglas (yellow card) 67'; Laštůvka (yellow card) 75'; Bezus 90+2'	Stadium: VVL Dynamo Stadium; Attendance: 550; Referee: Yaroslav Kozyk

8 April 2015 Second leg	Dnipro Dnipropetrovsk	1–0 (5–0 agg.)	Chornomorets Odesa	Dnipropetrovsk
20:30 EEST (UTC+3)	Shakhov 28'; Chyhrynskyi (red card) 50'; Vasylyev (red card) 54'	Report	Putrash (yellow card) 45+2'; Martynenko (yellow card) 66'; Balashov (yellow card) 79'; Murashov (yellow card) 84'	Stadium: Meteor Stadium; Attendance: 3,500; Referee: Yuriy Vaks
Note: Dnipro Dnipropetrovsk won 5–0 on aggregate.

Semi-finals

29 April 2015 First leg	Dnipro Dnipropetrovsk	0–1	Shakhtar Donetsk	Dnipropetrovsk
19:00 EEST (UTC+3)	Seleznyov (penalty missed) 50'; Matos (yellow card) 69'; Ksyonz (yellow card) 90+2'; Douglas (yellow card) 90+5'	Report	Stepanenko (yellow card) 26'; Hladkyy 45+1'; Rakytskiy (yellow card) 48'; Kucher (yellow card) 50'; Fred (yellow card) 65'	Stadium: Dnipro Arena; Attendance: 20,401; Referee: Yuri Mozharovskiy

20 May 2015 Second leg	Shakhtar Donetsk	1–1 (2–1 agg.)	Dnipro Dnipropetrovsk	Lviv
19:30 EEST (UTC+3)	Teixeira (yellow card) 33'; Luiz Adriano 77' (pen.); Fred (yellow card) 79'; Srna (yellow card) 80'; Pyatov (yellow card) 90+5'	Report	Kalinić 30'; Kankava (yellow card) 33'; Fedetskyi (yellow card) 39'; Konoplyanka (yellow card) 79'	Stadium: Arena Lviv; Attendance: 15,300; Referee: Anatoliy Abdula
Note: Shakhtar Donetsk won 2–1 on aggregate.

=== UEFA Champions League ===
Third qualifying round

30 July 2014 First leg	Dnipro Dnipropetrovsk (Ukraine)	0–0	(Denmark) Copenhagen	Kyiv, Ukraine
19:00 EEST (UTC+3)	Matheus (yellow card) 11'; Mazuch (yellow card) 22'	Report	Jørgensen (yellow card) 4'; Amartey (yellow card) 64'	Stadium: Olympic Stadium (Note: The match was played at Olympic Stadium, Kyiv instead of the club's home stadium, Dnipro-Arena, Dnipropetrovsk, due to the pro-Russian unrest in Ukraine.); Attendance: 23,410; Referee: Andre Marriner (England)

6 August 2014 Second leg	Copenhagen (Denmark)	2–0 (2–0 agg.)	(Ukraine) Dnipro Dnipropetrovsk	Copenhagen, Denmark
20:00 CEST (UTC+2)	Nilsson (yellow card) 20'; Cornelius 36', (yellow card) 86'; Kadrii 52'; Amartey (yellow card) 72'; Jørgensen (yellow card) 87'	Report	Konoplyanka (yellow card) 40'	Stadium: Parken Stadium; Attendance: 18,875; Referee: Duarte Gomes (Portugal)
Note: Copenhagen won 2–0 on aggregate.

=== UEFA Europa League ===
Play-off round

20 August 2014 First leg	Dnipro Dnipropetrovsk (Ukraine)	2–1	(Croatia) Hajduk Split	Kyiv, Ukraine
19:00 EEST (UTC+3)	Kravchenko (yellow card) 40'; Kalinić 50'; Shakhov 88'	Report	Sušić 47'; Maglica (yellow card) 68'	Stadium: Olympic Stadium; Attendance: 10,320; Referee: Aleksei Kulbakov (Belarus)

28 August 2014 Second leg	Hajduk Split (Croatia)	0–0 (1–2 agg.)	(Ukraine) Dnipro Dnipropetrovsk	Split, Croatia
19:00 CEST (UTC+2)	Milović (yellow card) 34'; Vršajević (yellow card) 49'; Mezga (yellow card) 75'; Milić (yellow card) 80'	Report	Zozulya (yellow card) 73'	Stadium: Stadion Poljud; Attendance: 31,000; Referee: Hüseyin Göçek (Turkey)
Note: Dnipro Dnipropetrovsk won 2–1 on aggregate.

==== Group stage ====
Pos	Team	Pld	W	D	L	GF	GA	GD	Pts	Qualification	INT	DNI	QAR	SET
1	(Italy) Internazionale	6	3	3	0	6	2	+4	12	Advance to knockout phase	—	2–1	2–0	0–0
2	(Ukraine) Dnipro Dnipropetrovsk	6	2	1	3	4	5	−1	7	Advance to knockout phase	0–1	—	0–1	1–0
3	(Azerbaijan) Qarabağ	6	1	3	2	3	5	−2	6		0–0	1–2	—	0–0
4	(France) Saint-Étienne	6	0	5	1	2	3	−1	5		1–1	0–0	1–1	—

Source: Soccerway
Rules for classification: Group stage tiebreakers

18 September 2014 1	Dnipro Dnipropetrovsk (Ukraine)	0–1	(Italy) Internazionale	Kyiv, Ukraine
20:00 EEST (UTC+3)	Zozulya (yellow card) 24'; Strinić (yellow card) 52'; Rotan (yellow card) 60' (yellow-red card) 69'	Report	Kuzmanović (yellow card) 27'; D'Ambrosio 71'	Stadium: Olympic Stadium; Attendance: 25,200; Referee: Felix Zwayer (Germany)

2 October 2014 2	Saint-Étienne (France)	0–0	(Ukraine) Dnipro Dnipropetrovsk	Saint-Étienne, France
21:05 CEST (UTC+2)	Perrin (yellow card) 27'; Bayal Sall (yellow card) 71'	Report	Zozulya (yellow card) 33'; Fedetskyi (yellow card) 52'; Mazuch (yellow card) 70'; Shakhov (yellow card) 81'; Douglas (yellow card) 89'	Stadium: Stade Geoffroy-Guichard; Attendance: 28,207; Referee: Alexandru Tudor (Romania)

23 October 2014 3	Dnipro Dnipropetrovsk (Ukraine)	0–1	(Azerbaijan) Qarabağ	Kyiv, Ukraine
22:05 EEST (UTC+3)	Fedetskyi (yellow card) 8'; Kravchenko (yellow card) 19'; Rotan (yellow card) 53'; Konoplyanka (yellow card) 59'	Report	Muarem 21'; Nadirov (yellow card) 25'; Garayev (yellow card) 50'; Agolli (yellow card) 53'; Medvedev (yellow card) 84'	Stadium: Olympic Stadium; Attendance: 3,120; Referee: Libor Kovařík (Czech Republic)

6 November 2014 4	Qarabağ (Azerbaijan)	1–2	(Ukraine) Dnipro Dnipropetrovsk	Baku, Azerbaijan
21:00 AZT (UTC+4)	George 36'; Guseynov (yellow card) 45'	Report	Kalinić 15', 73', (yellow card) 45+1'; Zozulya (yellow card) 30'; Strinić (yellow card) 30'; Kankava (yellow card) 49'; Rotan (yellow card) 51'	Stadium: Tofiq Bahramov Republican Stadium; Attendance: 31,000; Referee: Paweł Gil (Poland)

27 November 2014 5	Internazionale (Italy)	2–1	(Ukraine) Dnipro Dnipropetrovsk	Milan, Italy
21:05 CET (UTC+1)	Ranocchia (yellow card) 22' (yellow-red card) 46'; Kuzmanović 30'; Hernanes (yellow card) 31'; Osvaldo 50'; Guarín (yellow card) 66'	Report	Rotan 16'; Konoplyanka (penalty missed) 28'	Stadium: San Siro; Attendance: 14,415; Referee: Bobby Madden (Scotland)

11 December 2014 6	Dnipro Dnipropetrovsk (Ukraine)	1–0	(France) Saint-Étienne	Kyiv, Ukraine
19:00 EET (UTC+2)	Zozulya (yellow card) 48'; Fedetskyi (yellow card) 53', (goal) 66'; Douglas (yellow card) 55'; Kalinić (yellow card) 90+4'	Report	Perrin (yellow card) 36'; van Wolfswinkel (yellow card) 38'; Monnet-Paquet (yellow card) 65'	Stadium: Olympic Stadium; Attendance: 2,579; Referee: Marijo Strahonja (Croatia)

==== Knockout phase ====
Round of 32

19 February 2015 First leg	Dnipro Dnipropetrovsk (Ukraine)	2–0	(Greece) Olympiacos	Kyiv, Ukraine
20:00 EET (UTC+2)	Bezus (yellow card) 28'; Kankava 50', (yellow card) 57'; Rotan 54'; Konoplyanka (yellow card) 61'; Fedorchuk (yellow card) 90+2'	Report	Santana (yellow card) 56'; Afellay (yellow card) 78'; Milivojević (yellow card) 80'; Maniatis (yellow card) 90+4'	Stadium: Olympic Stadium (Note: The match was played at Olympic Stadium, Kyiv instead of the club's home stadium, Dnipro-Arena, Dnipropetrovsk, due to the war conditions in Eastern Ukraine.); Attendance: 5,837; Referee: Robert Schörgenhofer (Austria)

26 February 2015 Second leg	Olympiacos (Greece)	2–2 (2–4 agg.)	(Ukraine) Dnipro Dnipropetrovsk	Piraeus, Greece
22:05 EET (UTC+2)	Mitroglou 14'; Durmaz (yellow card) 33'; Milivojević (red card) 51'; Afellay (yellow card) 53'; Elabdellaoui (yellow card) 54'; Domínguez 90' (pen.)	Report	Fedetskyi 22', (yellow card) 89'; Kankava (yellow card) 43'; Fedorchuk (yellow card) 50'; Matheus (yellow card) 55'; Kalinić 90+2'	Stadium: Karaiskakis Stadium; Attendance: 24,854; Referee: Danny Makkelie (Netherlands)
Note: Dnipro Dnipropetrovsk won 4–2 on aggregate.

Round of 16

12 March 2015 First leg	Dnipro Dnipropetrovsk (Ukraine)	1–0	(Netherlands) Ajax	Kyiv, Ukraine
20:00 EET (UTC+2)	Zozulya 30'; Fedetskyi (yellow card) 49'; Rotan (yellow card) 51'; Zozulya (yellow card) 88'; Shakhov (yellow card) 89'	Report	Boilesen (yellow card) 23'; Bazoer (yellow card) 50'	Stadium: Olympic Stadium; Attendance: 10,581; Referee: Ivan Bebek (Croatia)

19 March 2015 Second leg	Ajax (Netherlands)	2–1 (a.e.t.) (2–2 (a) agg.)	(Ukraine) Dnipro Dnipropetrovsk	Amsterdam, Netherlands
21:05 CET (UTC+1)	Bazoer 60'; Kishna (yellow card) 70'; Van der Hoorn 117', (red card) 120+4'	Report	Matos (yellow card) 21'; Bezus (yellow card) 80'; Shakhov (yellow card) 87'; Konoplyanka 97'; Boyko (yellow card) 119'	Stadium: Amsterdam Arena; Attendance: 51,756; Referee: Aleksei Kulbakov (Belarus)
Note: 2–2 on aggregate. Dnipro Dnipropetrovsk won on away goals.

Quarter-finals
Order of legs reversed after original draw.

16 April 2015 First leg	Club Brugge (Belgium)	0–0	(Ukraine) Dnipro Dnipropetrovsk	Bruges, Belgium
21:05 CEST (UTC+2)	Vormer (yellow card) 60'; De Bock (yellow card) 61'	Report	Fedorchuk (yellow card) 35'; Matos (yellow card) 56'; Cheberyachko (yellow card) 57'	Stadium: Jan Breydel Stadium; Attendance: 26,600; Referee: Damir Skomina (Slovenia)

23 April 2015 Second leg	Dnipro Dnipropetrovsk (Ukraine)	1–0 (1–0 agg.)	(Belgium) Club Brugge	Kyiv, Ukraine
22:05 EEST (UTC+3)	Rotan (yellow card) 59'; Kankava (yellow card) 81'; Shakhov 82'	Report	Oularé (yellow card) 87'	Stadium: Olympic Stadium; Attendance: 16,234; Referee: Alberto Undiano Mallenco (Spain)
Note: Dnipro Dnipropetrovsk won 1–0 on aggregate.

Semi-finals

7 May 2015 First leg	Napoli (Italy)	1–1	(Ukraine) Dnipro Dnipropetrovsk	Naples, Italy
21:05 CEST (UTC+2)	López 50'	Report	Kankava (yellow card) 24'; Fedetskyi (yellow card) 73'; Seleznyov 81'	Stadium: Stadio San Paolo; Attendance: 41,095; Referee: Svein Oddvar Moen (Norway)

14 May 2015 Second leg	Dnipro Dnipropetrovsk (Ukraine)	1–0 (2–1 agg.)	(Italy) Napoli	Kyiv, Ukraine
22:05 EEST (UTC+3)	Matos (yellow card) 23'; Fedetskyi (yellow card) 44'; Seleznyov 58', (yellow card) 70'; Kankava (yellow card) 75'; Matheus (yellow card) 85'; Boyko (yellow card) 90+5'	Report	Gabbiadini (yellow card) 27'; Ghoulam (yellow card) 81'; Callejón (yellow card) 86'	Stadium: Olympic Stadium; Attendance: 62,344; Referee: Milorad Mažić (Serbia)
Note: Dnipro Dnipropetrovsk won 2–1 on aggregate.

Final

27 May 2015 Final	Dnipro Dnipropetrovsk (Ukraine)	2–3	(Spain) Sevilla	Warsaw, Poland
20:45 CEST (UTC+2)	Kalinić 7', (yellow card) 45+2'; Kankava (yellow card) 17'; Rotan 44', (yellow card) 75'; Bezus (yellow card) 70'; Matos (yellow card) 83'	Report	Krychowiak 28', (yellow card) 45+2'; Bacca 31', 73', (yellow card) 74'; Carriço (yellow card) 62'	Stadium: National Stadium; Attendance: 45,000; Referee: Martin Atkinson (England)
