= 2015 UEFA Europa League final =

- Match programme cover
- Event: 2014–15 UEFA Europa League
Dnipro Dnipropetrovsk	Sevilla
(Ukraine)	(Spain)
2	3
- Date: 27 May 2015
- Venue: National Stadium, Warsaw
- Man of the Match: Éver Banega (Sevilla)
- Referee: Martin Atkinson (England)
- Attendance: 45,000
- Weather: Partly cloudy 13 °C (55 °F); 65% humidity

The 2015 UEFA Europa League final was the final match of the 2014–15 UEFA Europa League, the 44th season of Europe's secondary club football tournament organised by UEFA, and the sixth season since it was renamed from the UEFA Cup to the UEFA Europa League. It was played at the National Stadium in Warsaw, Poland, on 27 May 2015, between Ukrainian side Dnipro Dnipropetrovsk and the title holders, Spanish side Sevilla. Sevilla won the match 3–2 for a record fourth title.

As winners, Sevilla earned the right to play against the winners of the 2014–15 UEFA Champions League, Barcelona, in the 2015 UEFA Super Cup. Moreover, for the first time, a place in the UEFA Champions League was reserved for the UEFA Europa League winners, meaning that Sevilla automatically qualified for the 2015–16 UEFA Champions League despite not qualifying through their domestic league position.

== Venue ==
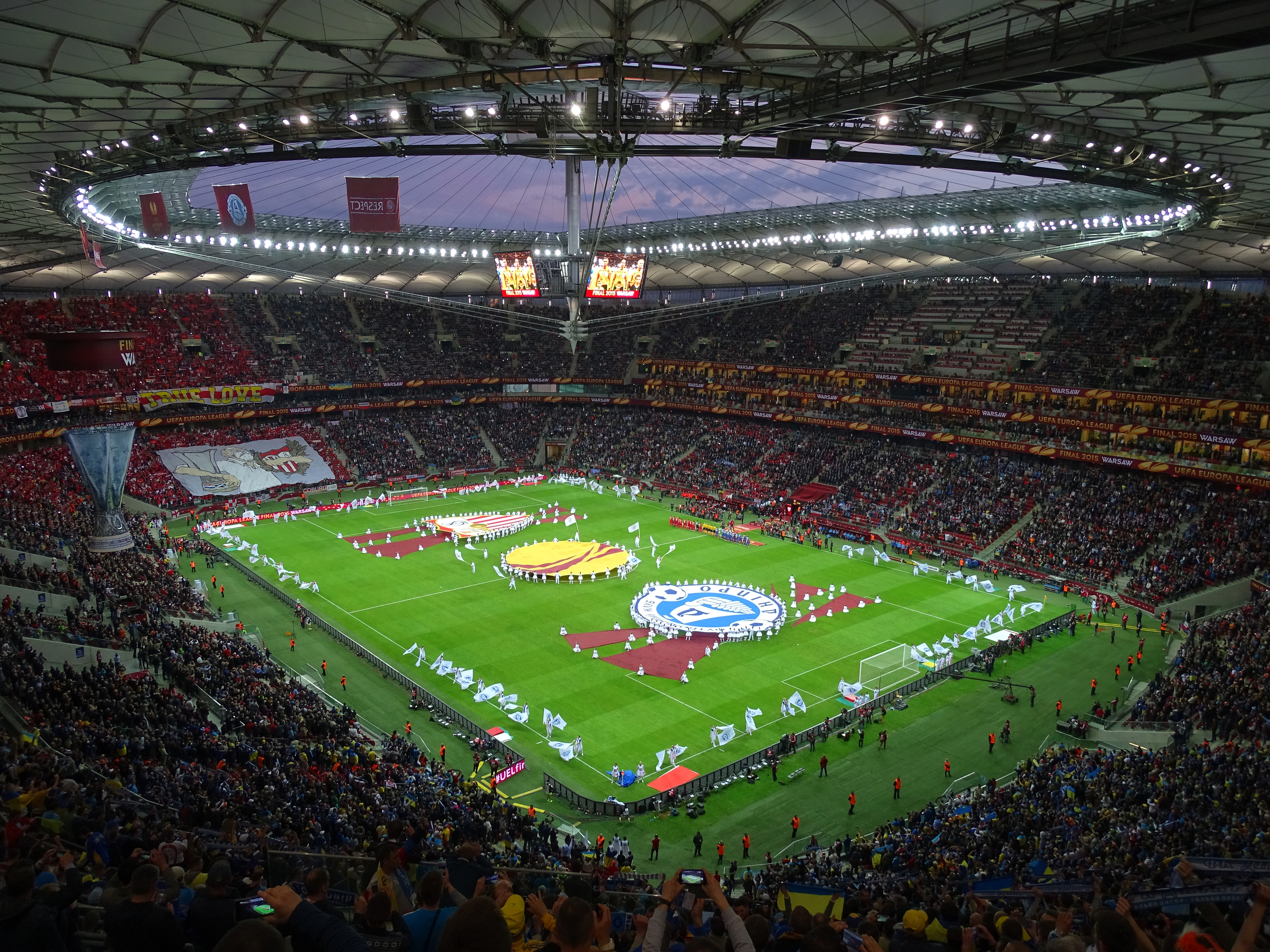
The National Stadium in Warsaw, Poland, hosted the final.

The National Stadium was announced as the venue of the final at the UEFA Executive Committee meeting on 23 May 2013. This was the first UEFA club final hosted in Poland.

The National Stadium is a retractable roof football stadium located in Warsaw, Poland. It is used mostly for football matches and it is the home stadium of Poland national football team. The stadium has a seating capacity of 58,145 which makes it the largest association football arena in Poland. Its construction started in 2008 and finished in November 2011. It is located on the site of the former Stadion Dziesięciolecia, on Aleja Zieleniecka in Praga Południe district, near the city centre. It hosted three group matches (including the opening match), a quarter-final, and a semi-final in UEFA Euro 2012, co-hosted by Poland and Ukraine.

== Background ==
This was Dnipro Dnipropetrovsk's first European final. They were the second Ukrainian team to reach the UEFA Cup/Europa League final, after Shakhtar Donetsk, who defeated Werder Bremen in the 2009 final in Istanbul, and the third Ukrainian team to play a European final, after Shakhtar Donetsk and Dynamo Kyiv, who won two Cup Winners' Cup finals in 1975 and 1986 as representatives of the Soviet Union. Before this final, Ukrainian clubs had won every major European final which they had competed.

This was Sevilla's fourth UEFA Cup/Europa League final. They won all three of their previous finals (in 2006, 2007 and 2014). As they won their fourth title, they became the outright record holder, breaking a tie with Juventus, Inter Milan and Liverpool. Their manager Unai Emery, who was also the winning manager in 2014, became the fifth coach to win the title twice or more, after Giovanni Trapattoni (Juventus in 1977 and 1993, Inter Milan in 1991), Luis Molowny (Real Madrid in 1985 and 1986), Juande Ramos (Sevilla in 2006 and 2007) and Rafael Benítez (Valencia in 2004, Chelsea in 2013).

The two sides had never met in UEFA club competitions.

== Route to the final ==
Note: In the table, the score of the finalist is given first (H = home; A = away).

(Ukraine) Dnipro Dnipropetrovsk				Round	(Spain) Sevilla			
Champions League					Europa League			
Opponent	Agg.	1st leg	2nd leg	Qualifying phase (CL, EL)	Opponent	Agg.	1st leg	2nd leg
(Denmark) Copenhagen	0–2	0–0 (H)	0–2 (A)	Third qualifying round	Bye			
Europa League					Bye			
(Croatia) Hajduk Split	2–1	2–1 (H)	0–0 (A)	Play-off round	Bye			
Opponent	Result			Group stage	Opponent	Result		
(Italy) Inter Milan	0–1 (H)			Matchday 1	(Netherlands) Feyenoord	2–0 (H)		
(France) Saint-Étienne	0–0 (A)			Matchday 2	(Croatia) Rijeka	2–2 (A)		
(Azerbaijan) Qarabağ	0–1 (H)			Matchday 3	(Belgium) Standard Liège	0–0 (A)		
(Azerbaijan) Qarabağ	2–1 (A)			Matchday 4	(Belgium) Standard Liège	3–1 (H)		
(Italy) Inter Milan	1–2 (A)			Matchday 5	(Netherlands) Feyenoord	0–2 (A)		
(France) Saint-Étienne	1–0 (H)			Matchday 6	(Croatia) Rijeka	1–0 (H)		
Group F runners-up: Pos / Team / Pld / Pts; 1 / (Italy) Internazionale / 6 / 12; 2 / (Ukraine) Dnipro Dnipropetrovsk / 6 / 7; 3 / (Azerbaijan) Qarabağ / 6 / 6; 4 / (France) Saint-Étienne / 6 / 5; Source: Soccerway				Final standings	Group G runners-up: Pos / Team / Pld / Pts; 1 / (Netherlands) Feyenoord / 6 / 12; 2 / (Spain) Sevilla / 6 / 11; 3 / (Croatia) Rijeka / 6 / 7; 4 / (Belgium) Standard Liège / 6 / 4; Source: Soccerway			
Opponent	Agg.	1st leg	2nd leg	Knockout phase	Opponent	Agg.	1st leg	2nd leg
(Greece) Olympiacos	4–2	2–0 (H)	2–2 (A)	Round of 32	(Germany) Borussia Mönchengladbach	4–2	1–0 (H)	3–2 (A)
(Netherlands) Ajax	2–2 (a)	1–0 (H)	1–2 (a.e.t.) (A)	Round of 16	(Spain) Villarreal	5–2	3–1 (A)	2–1 (H)
(Belgium) Club Brugge	1–0	0–0 (A)	1–0 (H)	Quarter-finals	(Russia) Zenit Saint Petersburg	4–3	2–1 (H)	2–2 (A)
(Italy) Napoli	2–1	1–1 (A)	1–0 (H)	Semi-finals	(Italy) Fiorentina	5–0	3–0 (H)	2–0 (A)

=== Dnipro Dnipropetrovsk ===
As runners-up of the 2013–14 Ukrainian Premier League behind Shakhtar, Dnipro were awarded a spot in the third qualifying round of the 2014–15 UEFA Champions League for the first time in their history. They were drawn against Danish runners-up FC Copenhagen, but a draw in the first leg at home, followed by a 2–0 defeat in Denmark, meant they dropped down into the Europa League play-off, where they defeated Hajduk Split to reach the group stage for the third time in a row.

Dnipro were drawn in Group F with Inter Milan, Saint-Étienne, and Qarabağ. The group stage campaign started disastrously for the Ukrainians, who earned only a single point in their first three games with a 0–0 draw away to Saint-Étienne and 1–0 home defeats to both Inter and Qarabağ. On matchday 4, a 2–1 away win over the Azerbaijani team ended a winless run, but Dnipro were again defeated by Inter 2–1 in Milan, despite taking a 1–0 lead through Ruslan Rotan's early goal. Dnipro went into their final group match at home to Saint-Étienne at the bottom of the Group F table and needing a win to stand a chance of qualifying; Artem Fedetskyi scored the only goal of the match midway through the second half to secure a 1–0 win. With Qarabağ only managing a 0–0 draw against group winners Inter, Dnipro finished the group stage in second place with seven points.

=== Sevilla ===
As title holders, Sevilla qualified for the group stage automatically, and were placed in Group G with Feyenoord, Rijeka and Standard Liège. They began their campaign with a 2–0 win over Feyenoord, with first-half goals from Grzegorz Krychowiak and Stéphane Mbia. Two weeks later, Mbia earned a 2–2 draw at Rijeka. Sevilla then played Liège twice, a goalless away draw and a 3–1 home victory with goals from Kevin Gameiro, José Antonio Reyes and Carlos Bacca. They then lost 2–0 away to Feyenoord, sending the Dutch side to the knockout stage ahead of Sevilla. The Spanish side secured second place in the final game with a home victory over Rijeka via Denis Suárez's first European goal.

== Pre-match ==
=== Ambassador ===
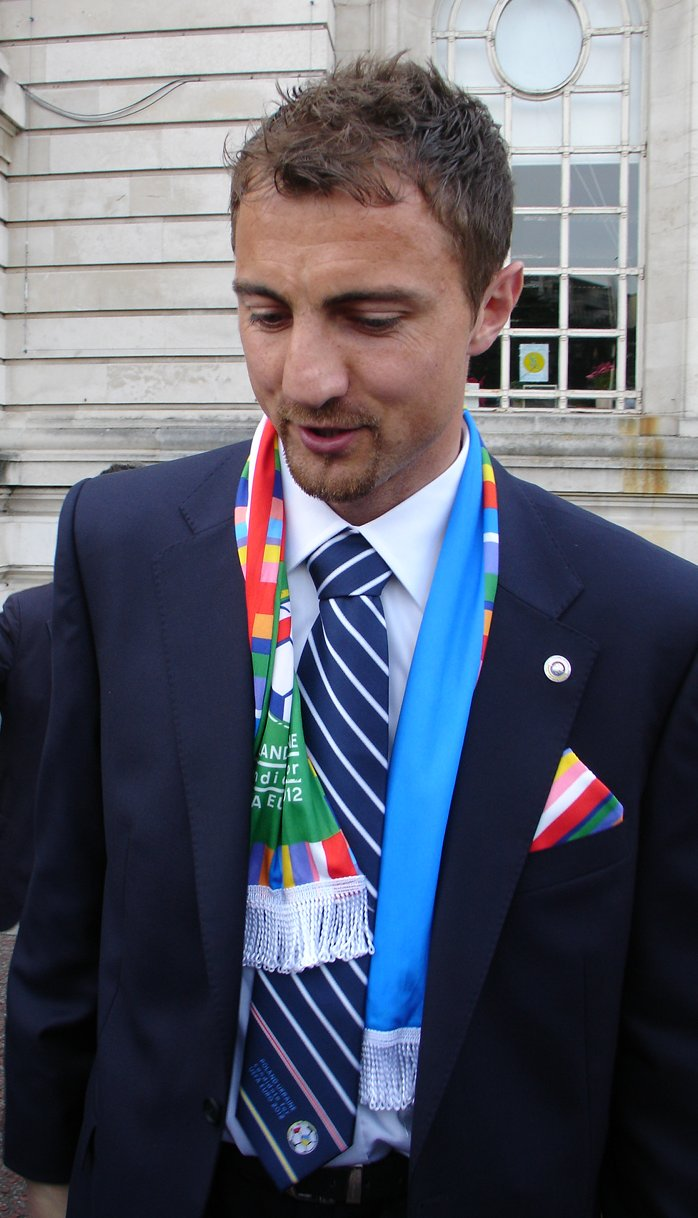
Jerzy Dudek was named as the ambassador for the final.

Former Poland international goalkeeper Jerzy Dudek, who won the Champions League with Liverpool in 2005, was named the ambassador for the final.

=== Officials ===
In May 2015, English referee Martin Atkinson was chosen to oversee the final. He was joined by compatriots Stephen Child and Michael Mullarkey as assistant referees, Andre Marriner and Anthony Taylor as additional assistant referees, Jake Collin as reserve assistant referee, and the Czech Pavel Královec as fourth official.

=== Identity ===
UEFA unveiled the visual identity of the final on 29 August 2014.

=== Ticketing ===
With a stadium capacity of 56,000, a total of 44,000 tickets were made available to fans and the general public, with the two finalist teams receiving 9,500 tickets each and 25,000 tickets sold to fans worldwide via the UEFA website from 26 February to 25 March 2015 in four price categories: €130, €90, €65, and €40.

=== Kits ===
At the behest of club president José Castro, Sevilla chose to wear their red away kit, featuring their badge rather than the "SFC" monogram which they had previously been sporting.

== Match ==
=== Summary ===
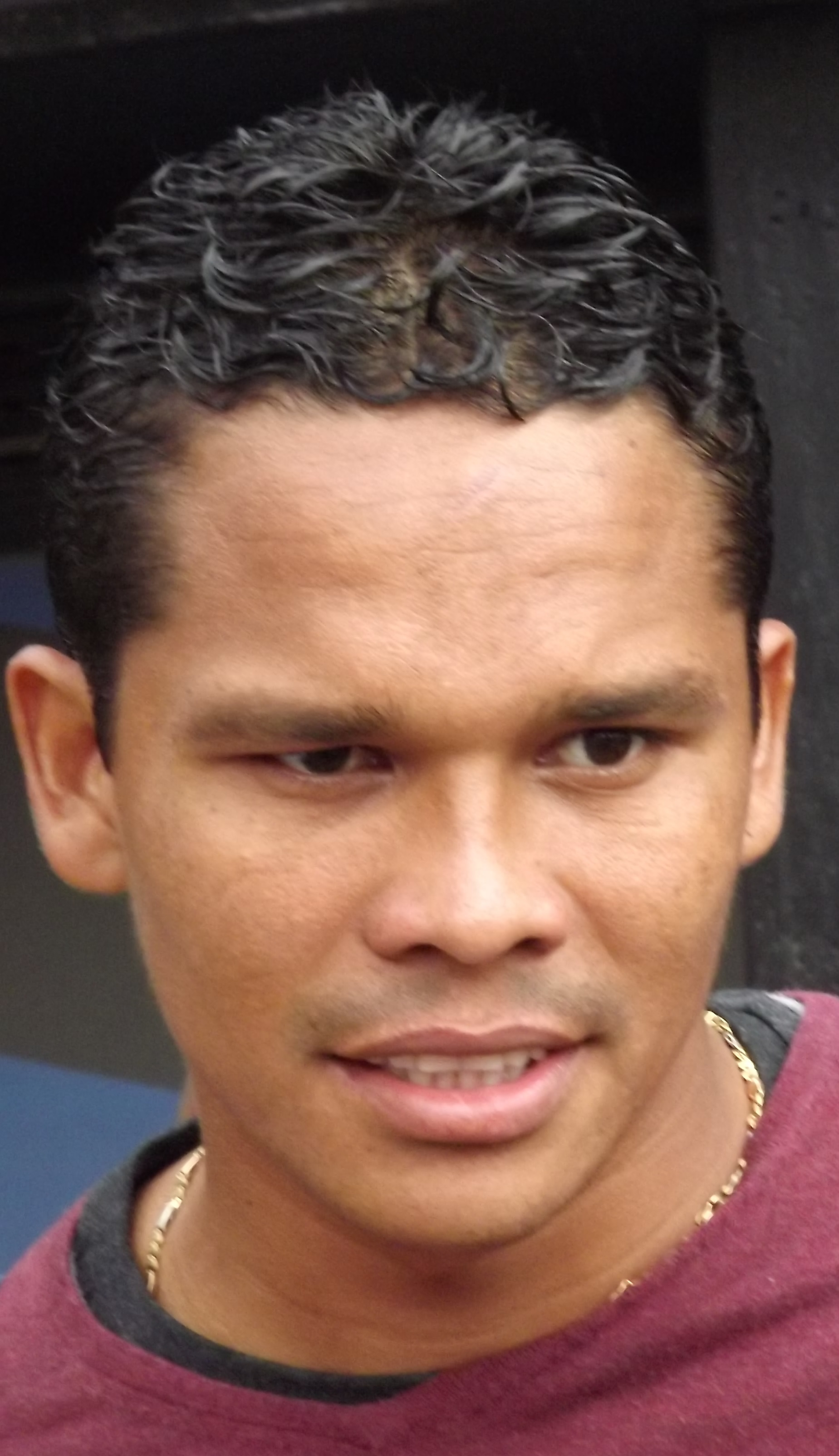
Carlos Bacca scored twice for Sevilla, including the winning goal

Although Sevilla dominated possession in the early exchanges, Dnipro opened the scoring after seven minutes when Nikola Kalinić headed in a cross from Matheus. In the 28th minute, Dnipro failed to clear from a free kick and Sevilla midfielder Grzegorz Krychowiak took possession of the ball, taking a step to evade Léo Matos before shooting an equaliser in his home country. Only three minutes later, the Spanish club took the lead, when captain José Antonio Reyes, in what was reported to be his final match for Sevilla, found Carlos Bacca who rounded Dnipro goalkeeper Denys Boyko. Only two minutes before half time, Dnipro equalised, with Ruslan Rotan dispatching a free kick past Sergio Rico.

In the 58th minute, Sevilla made the game's first substitution: Reyes made way for Coke, who went into his habitual right-back position, pushing Aleix Vidal forward into the right-wing position held by Reyes. Fifteen minutes later, Sevilla scored the winner, Bacca converting after being supplied by Vitolo. Soon after, Dnipro made an attacking change, replacing Kalinić with Yevhen Seleznyov, and Sevilla substituted Bacca for Kevin Gameiro. The two teams then made their last substitutions in the closing stages, Dnipro replaced Jaba Kankava with Yevhen Shakhov and Sevilla took off Éver Banega for Vicente Iborra.

Soon after all changes had been made, Dnipro's Matheus collapsed and was taken off by medical staff. Manager Myron Markevych confirmed that he was treated at hospital for a nasal fracture and a head injury, being discharged in good health hours later to reunite with his teammates.

Sevilla's record fourth title meant that Spain and Italy were tied with the most UEFA Cup/Europa League titles, with both countries having won nine times. José Antonio Reyes became the first player to win the UEFA Cup/Europa League four times, as he was also a member of the winning side for Atlético Madrid in 2010 and 2012 (although he missed the latter final) and for Sevilla in 2014. Three players had won the title three times: Ray Clemence, Giuseppe Bergomi, and Nicola Berti.

=== Details ===
27 May 2015
20:45 UTC+2

Dnipro Dnipropetrovsk (Ukraine)	2–3	(Spain) Sevilla
Kalinić 7'; Rotan 44'	Report	Krychowiak 28'; Bacca 31', 73'

National Stadium, Warsaw
Attendance: 45,000
Referee: Martin Atkinson (England)

Dnipro Dnipropetrovsk	Sevilla

GK	71	(Ukraine) Denys Boyko
RB	44	(Ukraine) Artem Fedetskyi
CB	23	(Brazil) Douglas Bacelar
CB	14	(Ukraine) Yevhen Cheberyachko
LB	12	(Brazil) Léo Matos	(yellow card) 83'
DM	7	(Georgia (country)) Jaba Kankava	(yellow card) 17'	(substituted off) 85'
CM	29	(Ukraine) Ruslan Rotan (c)	(yellow card) 75'
CM	25	(Ukraine) Valeriy Fedorchuk		(substituted off) 68'
RW	99	(Brazil) Matheus
LW	10	(Ukraine) Yevhen Konoplyanka
CF	9	(Croatia) Nikola Kalinić	(yellow card) 45+2'	(substituted off) 78'
Substitutes:
GK	16	(Czech Republic) Jan Laštůvka
DF	2	(Romania) Alexandru Vlad
DF	24	(Ukraine) Valeriy Luchkevych
MF	19	(Ukraine) Roman Bezus	(yellow card) 70'	(substituted on) 68'
MF	20	(Portugal) Bruno Gama
MF	28	(Ukraine) Yevhen Shakhov		(substituted on) 85'
FW	11	(Ukraine) Yevhen Seleznyov		(substituted on) 78'
Manager:
(Ukraine) Myron Markevych

GK	29	(Spain) Sergio Rico
RB	22	(Spain) Aleix Vidal
CB	6	(Portugal) Daniel Carriço	(yellow card) 62'
CB	15	(France) Timothée Kolodziejczak
LB	2	(France) Benoît Trémoulinas
DM	25	(Cameroon) Stéphane Mbia
CM	19	(Argentina) Éver Banega		(substituted off) 89'
CM	4	(Poland) Grzegorz Krychowiak	(yellow card) 45+2'
RW	10	(Spain) José Antonio Reyes (c)		(substituted off) 58'
LW	20	(Spain) Vitolo
CF	9	(Colombia) Carlos Bacca	(yellow card) 74'	(substituted off) 82'
Substitutes:
GK	13	(Portugal) Beto
DF	3	(Spain) Fernando Navarro
DF	5	(Portugal) Diogo Figueiras
DF	23	(Spain) Coke		(substituted on) 58'
MF	12	(Spain) Vicente Iborra		(substituted on) 89'
MF	17	(Spain) Denis Suárez
FW	7	(France) Kevin Gameiro		(substituted on) 82'
Manager:
(Spain) Unai Emery

Man of the Match:
Éver Banega (Sevilla)

Assistant referees:
Mike Mullarkey (England)
Stephen Child (England)
Fourth official:
Pavel Královec (Czech Republic)
Additional assistant referees:
Anthony Taylor (England)
Andre Marriner (England)
Reserve assistant referee:
Jake Collin (England)

Match rules

- 90 minutes
- 30 minutes of extra time if necessary
- Penalty shoot-out if scores still level
- Seven named substitutes, of which up to three may be used

=== Statistics ===
First half
Statistic	Dnipro Dnipropetrovsk	Sevilla
Goals scored	2	2
Total shots	4	11
Shots on target	3	3
Saves	1	1
Ball possession	39%	61%
Corner kicks	2	4
Fouls committed	14	10
Offsides	1	1
Yellow cards	2	1
Red cards	0	0

Second half
Statistic	Dnipro Dnipropetrovsk	Sevilla
Goals scored	0	1
Total shots	8	7
Shots on target	2	2
Saves	1	2
Ball possession	45%	55%
Corner kicks	3	7
Fouls committed	10	6
Offsides	0	1
Yellow cards	3	2
Red cards	0	0

Overall
Statistic	Dnipro Dnipropetrovsk	Sevilla
Goals scored	2	3
Total shots	12	18
Shots on target	5	5
Saves	2	3
Ball possession	42%	58%
Corner kicks	5	11
Fouls committed	24	16
Offsides	1	2
Yellow cards	5	3
Red cards	0	0

== See also ==
- 2015 UEFA Champions League final
- 2015 UEFA Super Cup
- Sevilla FC in European football
- 2014–15 FC Dnipro season
- 2014–15 Sevilla FC season
