= 2014–15 UEFA Europa League knockout phase =

International football competition

The 2014–15 UEFA Europa League knockout phase began on 19 February and concluded on 27 May 2015 with the final at National Stadium in Warsaw, Poland to decide the champions of the 2014–15 UEFA Europa League. A total of 32 teams competed in the knockout phase.

Times up to 28 March 2015 (round of 16) were CET (UTC+1), thereafter (quarter-finals and beyond) times were CEST (UTC+2).

== Round and draw dates ==
All draws were held at UEFA headquarters in Nyon, Switzerland.

Round	Draw date and time	First leg	Second leg
Round of 32	15 December 2014, 13:00	19 February 2015	26 February 2015
Round of 16	27 February 2015, 13:00	12 March 2015	19 March 2015
Quarter-finals	20 March 2015, 13:00	16 April 2015	23 April 2015
Semi-finals	24 April 2015, 12:00	7 May 2015	14 May 2015
Final	24 April 2015, 12:00	27 May 2015 at National Stadium, Warsaw	

Matches may also be played on Tuesdays or Wednesdays instead of the regular Thursdays due to scheduling conflicts.

== Format ==
The knockout phase involved 32 teams: the 24 teams which qualified as winners and runners-up of each of the twelve groups in the group stage, and the eight third-placed teams from the Champions League group stage.

Each tie in the knockout phase, apart from the final, was played over two legs, with each team playing one leg at home. The team that scored more goals on aggregate over the two legs advanced to the next round. If the aggregate score was level, the away goals rule was applied, i.e. the team that scored more goals away from home over the two legs advanced. If away goals were also equal, then thirty minutes of extra time was played. The away goals rule was again applied after extra time, i.e. if there were goals scored during extra time and the aggregate score was still level, the visiting team advanced by virtue of more away goals scored. If no goals were scored during extra time, the tie was decided by penalty shoot-out. In the final, which was played as a single match, if scores were level at the end of normal time, extra time was played, followed by penalty shoot-out if scores remained tied.

The mechanism of the draws for each round was as follows:

- In the draw for the round of 32, the twelve group winners and the four third-placed teams from the Champions League group stage with the better group records were seeded, and the twelve group runners-up and the other four third-placed teams from the Champions League group stage were unseeded. The seeded teams were drawn against the unseeded teams, with the seeded teams hosting the second leg. Teams from the same group or the same association could not be drawn against each other.
- In the draws for the round of 16 onwards, there were no seedings, and teams from the same group or the same association could be drawn against each other.

On 17 July 2014, the UEFA emergency panel ruled that Ukrainian and Russian clubs would not be drawn against each other "until further notice" due to the political unrest between the countries. Therefore, a Ukrainian club (Dnipro Dnipropetrovsk or Dynamo Kyiv) and a Russian club (Dynamo Moscow or Zenit Saint Petersburg) would not be drawn into the same tie in any round except the final.

== Qualified teams ==
=== Europa League group stage winners and runners-up ===
Group	Winners (Seeded in round of 32 draw)	Runners-up (Unseeded in round of 32 draw)
A	(Germany) Borussia Mönchengladbach	(Spain) Villarreal
B	(Belgium) Club Brugge	(Italy) Torino
C	(Turkey) Beşiktaş	(England) Tottenham Hotspur
D	(Austria) Red Bull Salzburg	(Scotland) Celtic
E	(Russia) Dynamo Moscow	(Netherlands) PSV Eindhoven
F	(Italy) Internazionale	(Ukraine) Dnipro Dnipropetrovsk
G	(Netherlands) Feyenoord	(Spain) Sevilla
H	(England) Everton	(Germany) VfL Wolfsburg
I	(Italy) Napoli	(Switzerland) Young Boys
J	(Ukraine) Dynamo Kyiv	(Denmark) AaB
K	(Italy) Fiorentina	(France) Guingamp
L	(Poland) Legia Warsaw	(Turkey) Trabzonspor

=== Champions League group stage third-placed teams ===
Pos	Grp	Team	Pld	W	D	L	GF	GA	GD	Pts	Seeding
1	A	(Greece) Olympiacos	6	3	0	3	10	13	−3	9	Seeded in round of 32 draw
2	G	(Portugal) Sporting CP	6	2	1	3	12	12	0	7	Seeded in round of 32 draw
3	H	(Spain) Athletic Bilbao	6	2	1	3	5	6	−1	7	Seeded in round of 32 draw
4	C	(Russia) Zenit Saint Petersburg	6	2	1	3	4	6	−2	7	Seeded in round of 32 draw
5	D	(Belgium) Anderlecht	6	1	3	2	8	10	−2	6	Unseeded in round of 32 draw
6	F	(Netherlands) Ajax	6	1	2	3	8	10	−2	5	Unseeded in round of 32 draw
7	B	(England) Liverpool	6	1	2	3	5	9	−4	5	Unseeded in round of 32 draw
8	E	(Italy) Roma	6	1	2	3	8	14	−6	5	Unseeded in round of 32 draw

Source: UEFA
Rules for classification: 1) Points; 2) Goal difference; 3) Goals scored; 4) Away goals scored; 5) Wins; 6) Away wins; 7) Club coefficient.

== Bracket ==
Round of 32
(Germany) VfL Wolfsburg	2	0	2
(Portugal) Sporting CP	0	0	0
(Scotland) Celtic	3	0	3
(Italy) Internazionale	3	1	4
(Turkey) Trabzonspor	0	0	0
(Italy) Napoli	4	1	5
(Belgium) Anderlecht	0	1	1
(Russia) Dynamo Moscow	0	3	3
(Denmark) AaB	1	0	1
(Belgium) Club Brugge	3	3	6
(England) Liverpool	1	0	1 (4)
(Turkey) Beşiktaş (p)	0	1	1 (5)
(Ukraine) Dnipro Dnipropetrovsk	2	2	4
(Greece) Olympiacos	0	2	2
(Netherlands) Ajax	1	3	4
(Poland) Legia Warsaw	0	0	0
(Spain) Villarreal	2	3	5
(Austria) Red Bull Salzburg	1	1	2
(Spain) Sevilla	1	3	4
(Germany) Borussia Mönchengladbach	0	2	2
(Netherlands) PSV Eindhoven	0	0	0
(Russia) Zenit Saint Petersburg	1	3	4
(Italy) Torino	2	3	5
(Spain) Athletic Bilbao	2	2	4
(Switzerland) Young Boys	1	1	2
(England) Everton	4	3	7
(France) Guingamp	2	1	3
(Ukraine) Dynamo Kyiv	1	3	4
(England) Tottenham Hotspur	1	0	1
(Italy) Fiorentina	1	2	3
(Italy) Roma	1	2	3
(Netherlands) Feyenoord	1	1	2

Round of 16
(Germany) VfL Wolfsburg	3	2	5
(Italy) Internazionale	1	1	2
(Italy) Napoli	3	0	3
(Russia) Dynamo Moscow	1	0	1
(Belgium) Club Brugge	2	3	5
(Turkey) Beşiktaş	1	1	2
(Ukraine) Dnipro Dnipropetrovsk (a.e.t.; a)	1	1	2
(Netherlands) Ajax	0	2	2
(Spain) Villarreal	1	1	2
(Spain) Sevilla	3	2	5
(Russia) Zenit Saint Petersburg	2	0	2
(Italy) Torino	0	1	1
(England) Everton	2	2	4
(Ukraine) Dynamo Kyiv	1	5	6
(Italy) Fiorentina	1	3	4
(Italy) Roma	1	0	1

Quarter-finals
(Germany) VfL Wolfsburg	1	2	3
(Italy) Napoli	4	2	6
(Belgium) Club Brugge	0	0	0
(Ukraine) Dnipro Dnipropetrovsk	0	1	1
(Spain) Sevilla	2	2	4
(Russia) Zenit Saint Petersburg	1	2	3
(Ukraine) Dynamo Kyiv	1	0	1
(Italy) Fiorentina	1	2	3

Semi-finals
(Italy) Napoli	1	0	1
(Ukraine) Dnipro Dnipropetrovsk	1	1	2
(Spain) Sevilla	3	2	5
(Italy) Fiorentina	0	0	0

Final
27 May – Warsaw
(Ukraine) Dnipro Dnipropetrovsk	2
(Spain) Sevilla	3

== Round of 32 ==
The draw was held on 15 December 2014.

=== Summary ===
The first legs were played on 19 February, and the second legs were played on 26 February 2015.

Team 1	Agg.	Team 2	1st leg	2nd leg
Young Boys (Switzerland)	2–7	(England) Everton	1–4	1–3
Torino (Italy)	5–4	(Spain) Athletic Bilbao	2–2	3–2
Sevilla (Spain)	4–2	(Germany) Borussia Mönchengladbach	1–0	3–2
VfL Wolfsburg (Germany)	2–0	(Portugal) Sporting CP	2–0	0–0
Ajax (Netherlands)	4–0	(Poland) Legia Warsaw	1–0	3–0
AaB (Denmark)	1–6	(Belgium) Club Brugge	1–3	0–3
Anderlecht (Belgium)	1–3	(Russia) Dynamo Moscow	0–0	1–3
Dnipro Dnipropetrovsk (Ukraine)	4–2	(Greece) Olympiacos	2–0	2–2
Trabzonspor (Turkey)	0–5	(Italy) Napoli	0–4	0–1
Guingamp (France)	3–4	(Ukraine) Dynamo Kyiv	2–1	1–3
Villarreal (Spain)	5–2	(Austria) Red Bull Salzburg	2–1	3–1
Roma (Italy)	3–2	(Netherlands) Feyenoord	1–1	2–1
PSV Eindhoven (Netherlands)	0–4	(Russia) Zenit Saint Petersburg	0–1	0–3
Liverpool (England)	1–1 (4–5 p)	(Turkey) Beşiktaş	1–0	0–1 (a.e.t.)
Tottenham Hotspur (England)	1–3	(Italy) Fiorentina	1–1	0–2
Celtic (Scotland)	3–4	(Italy) Internazionale	3–3	0–1

=== Matches ===
19 February 2015
19:00

Young Boys (Switzerland)	1–4	(England) Everton
Hoarau 10'	Report	Lukaku 24', 39', 58'; Coleman 28'

Stade de Suisse, Bern
Attendance: 20,835
Referee: Jorge Sousa (Portugal)
26 February 2015
21:05

Everton (England)	3–1	(Switzerland) Young Boys
Lukaku 25' (pen.), 30'; Mirallas 42'	Report	Sanogo 13'

Goodison Park, Liverpool
Attendance: 25,058
Referee: Stefan Johannesson (Sweden)

Everton won 7–2 on aggregate.

19 February 2015
19:00

Torino (Italy)	2–2	(Spain) Athletic Bilbao
López 18', 42'	Report	Williams 9'; Gurpegui 73'

Stadio Olimpico, Turin
Attendance: 25,725
Referee: Michael Koukoulakis (Greece)
26 February 2015
21:05

Athletic Bilbao (Spain)	2–3	(Italy) Torino
Iraola 44'; De Marcos 61'	Report	Quagliarella 16' (pen.); López 45+2'; Darmian 68'

San Mamés, Bilbao
Attendance: 44,180
Referee: Liran Liany (Israel)

Torino won 5–4 on aggregate.

19 February 2015
21:05

Sevilla (Spain)	1–0	(Germany) Borussia Mönchengladbach
Iborra 70'	Report

Ramón Sánchez Pizjuán, Seville
Attendance: 26,850
Referee: Aleksandar Stavrev (Macedonia)
26 February 2015
19:00

Borussia Mönchengladbach (Germany)	2–3	(Spain) Sevilla
Xhaka 19'; Hazard 29'	Report	Bacca 8'; Vitolo 26', 79'

Stadion im Borussia-Park, Mönchengladbach
Attendance: 45,337
Referee: Marijo Strahonja (Croatia)

Sevilla won 4–2 on aggregate.

19 February 2015
19:00

VfL Wolfsburg (Germany)	2–0	(Portugal) Sporting CP
Dost 46', 63'	Report

Volkswagen Arena, Wolfsburg
Attendance: 19,207
Referee: Alon Yefet (Israel)
26 February 2015
21:05

Sporting CP (Portugal)	0–0	(Germany) VfL Wolfsburg
	Report

Estádio José Alvalade, Lisbon
Attendance: 23,097
Referee: Ruddy Buquet (France)

VfL Wolfsburg won 2–0 on aggregate.

19 February 2015
21:05

Ajax (Netherlands)	1–0	(Poland) Legia Warsaw
Milik 35'	Report

Amsterdam Arena, Amsterdam
Attendance: 46,761
Referee: Jonas Eriksson (Sweden)
26 February 2015
19:00

Legia Warsaw (Poland)	0–3	(Netherlands) Ajax
	Report	Milik 11', 43'; Viergever 13'

Polish Army Stadium, Warsaw
Attendance: 20 (Note: The Legia Warsaw v Ajax match was played behind closed doors due to punishment by UEFA.)
Referee: David Fernández Borbalán (Spain)

Ajax won 4–0 on aggregate.

19 February 2015
19:00

AaB (Denmark)	1–3	(Belgium) Club Brugge
Helenius 71' (pen.)	Report	Oulare 25'; Refaelov 29'; Petersen 61' (o.g.)

Nordjyske Arena, Aalborg
Attendance: 8,102
Referee: Tom Harald Hagen (Norway)
26 February 2015
21:05

Club Brugge (Belgium)	3–0	(Denmark) AaB
Vázquez 11'; Oularé 64'; Bolingoli-Mbombo 74'	Report

Jan Breydel Stadium, Bruges
Attendance: 11,804
Referee: Anastasios Sidiropoulos (Greece)

Club Brugge won 6–1 on aggregate.

19 February 2015
21:05

Anderlecht (Belgium)	0–0	(Russia) Dynamo Moscow
	Report

Constant Vanden Stock Stadium, Brussels
Attendance: 17,317
Referee: Felix Zwayer (Germany)
26 February 2015
18:00

Dynamo Moscow (Russia)	3–1	(Belgium) Anderlecht
Kozlov 47'; Yusupov 64'; Kurányi 90+5'	Report	Mitrović 29'

Arena Khimki, Khimki
Attendance: 12,316
Referee: Svein Oddvar Moen (Norway)

Dynamo Moscow won 3–1 on aggregate.

19 February 2015
19:00

Dnipro Dnipropetrovsk (Ukraine)	2–0	(Greece) Olympiacos
Kankava 50'; Rotan 54'	Report

Olympic Stadium, Kyiv (Note: Dnipro Dnipropetrovsk played their home matches at Olympic Stadium, Kyiv, instead of their regular stadium, Dnipro-Arena, Dnipropetrovsk, due to the war conditions in Eastern Ukraine.)
Attendance: 5,837
Referee: Robert Schörgenhofer (Austria)
26 February 2015
21:05

Olympiacos (Greece)	2–2	(Ukraine) Dnipro Dnipropetrovsk
Mitroglou 14'; Domínguez 90' (pen.)	Report	Fedetskyi 22'; Kalinić 90+2'

Karaiskakis Stadium, Piraeus
Attendance: 24,854
Referee: Danny Makkelie (Netherlands)

Dnipro Dnipropetrovsk won 4–2 on aggregate.

19 February 2015
19:00

Trabzonspor (Turkey)	0–4	(Italy) Napoli
	Report	Henrique 6'; Higuaín 20'; Gabbiadini 27'; Zapata 90+2'

Hüseyin Avni Aker Stadium, Trabzon
Attendance: 21,096
Referee: Vladislav Bezborodov (Russia)
26 February 2015
21:05

Napoli (Italy)	1–0	(Turkey) Trabzonspor
De Guzmán 19'	Report

Stadio San Paolo, Naples
Attendance: 14,410
Referee: Ivan Bebek (Croatia)

Napoli won 5–0 on aggregate.

19 February 2015
21:05

Guingamp (France)	2–1	(Ukraine) Dynamo Kyiv
Beauvue 72'; Diallo 75'	Report	Veloso 19'

Stade du Roudourou, Guingamp
Attendance: 16,191
Referee: Slavko Vinčić (Slovenia)
26 February 2015
19:00

Dynamo Kyiv (Ukraine)	3–1	(France) Guingamp
Teodorczyk 31'; Buyalskyi 46'; Husyev 75' (pen.)	Report	Mandanne 66'

Olympic Stadium, Kyiv
Attendance: 54,308
Referee: Martin Strömbergsson (Sweden)

Dynamo Kyiv won 4–3 on aggregate.

19 February 2015
21:05

Villarreal (Spain)	2–1	(Austria) Red Bull Salzburg
Uche 32'; Cheryshev 54'	Report	Soriano 48' (pen.)

El Madrigal, Villarreal
Attendance: 12,532
Referee: Bobby Madden (Scotland)
26 February 2015
19:00

Red Bull Salzburg (Austria)	1–3	(Spain) Villarreal
Djuricin 18'	Report	Vietto 33', 76'; G. dos Santos 79'

Red Bull Arena, Wals-Siezenheim
Attendance: 26,020
Referee: Kenn Hansen (Denmark)

Villarreal won 5–2 on aggregate.

19 February 2015
19:00

Roma (Italy)	1–1	(Netherlands) Feyenoord
Gervinho 22'	Report	Kazim-Richards 55'

Stadio Olimpico, Rome
Attendance: 29,292
Referee: Ovidiu Hațegan (Romania)
26 February 2015
21:05

Feyenoord (Netherlands)	1–2	(Italy) Roma
Manu 57'	Report	Ljajić 45+2'; Gervinho 60'

De Kuip, Rotterdam
Attendance: 45,000
Referee: Clément Turpin (France)

Roma won 3–2 on aggregate.

19 February 2015
19:00

PSV Eindhoven (Netherlands)	0–1	(Russia) Zenit Saint Petersburg
	Report	Hulk 64'

Philips Stadion, Eindhoven
Attendance: 21,000
Referee: Paolo Tagliavento (Italy)
26 February 2015
18:00

Zenit Saint Petersburg (Russia)	3–0	(Netherlands) PSV Eindhoven
Rondón 28', 67'; Hulk 48'	Report

Petrovsky Stadium, Saint Petersburg
Attendance: 17,194
Referee: Cüneyt Çakır (Turkey)

Zenit Saint Petersburg won 4–0 on aggregate.

19 February 2015
21:05

Liverpool (England)	1–0	(Turkey) Beşiktaş
Balotelli 85' (pen.)	Report

Anfield, Liverpool
Attendance: 43,353
Referee: Szymon Marciniak (Poland)
26 February 2015
19:00

Beşiktaş (Turkey)	1–0 (a.e.t.)	(England) Liverpool
Arslan 72'	Report
Penalties
Ba (penalty scored); Töre (penalty scored); Kavlak (penalty scored); Hutchinson (penalty scored); Arslan (penalty scored)	5–4	(penalty scored) Lambert; (penalty scored) Lallana; (penalty scored) Can; (penalty scored) Allen; (penalty missed) Lovren

Atatürk Olympic Stadium, Istanbul
Attendance: 63,324
Referee: Damir Skomina (Slovenia)

1–1 on aggregate; Beşiktaş won 5–4 on penalties.

19 February 2015
21:05

Tottenham Hotspur (England)	1–1	(Italy) Fiorentina
Soldado 6'	Report	Basanta 36'

White Hart Lane, London
Attendance: 34,235
Referee: Carlos Velasco Carballo (Spain)
26 February 2015
19:00

Fiorentina (Italy)	2–0	(England) Tottenham Hotspur
Gómez 54'; Salah 71'	Report

Stadio Artemio Franchi, Florence
Attendance: 29,886
Referee: Hüseyin Göçek (Turkey)

Fiorentina won 3–1 on aggregate.

19 February 2015
21:05

Celtic (Scotland)	3–3	(Italy) Internazionale
Armstrong 24'; Campagnaro 26' (o.g.); Guidetti 90+3'	Report	Shaqiri 4'; Palacio 13', 45'

Celtic Park, Glasgow
Attendance: 58,500
Referee: István Vad (Hungary)
26 February 2015
19:00

Internazionale (Italy)	1–0	(Scotland) Celtic
Guarín 88'	Report

San Siro, Milan
Attendance: 37,133
Referee: Ivan Kružliak (Slovakia)

Internazionale won 4–3 on aggregate.

== Round of 16 ==
The draw was held on 27 February 2015.

=== Summary ===
The first legs were played on 12 March, and the second legs were played on 19 March 2015.

Team 1	Agg.	Team 2	1st leg	2nd leg
Everton (England)	4–6	(Ukraine) Dynamo Kyiv	2–1	2–5
Dnipro Dnipropetrovsk (Ukraine)	2–2 (a)	(Netherlands) Ajax	1–0	1–2 (a.e.t.)
Zenit Saint Petersburg (Russia)	2–1	(Italy) Torino	2–0	0–1
VfL Wolfsburg (Germany)	5–2	(Italy) Internazionale	3–1	2–1
Villarreal (Spain)	2–5	(Spain) Sevilla	1–3	1–2
Napoli (Italy)	3–1	(Russia) Dynamo Moscow	3–1	0–0
Club Brugge (Belgium)	5–2	(Turkey) Beşiktaş	2–1	3–1
Fiorentina (Italy)	4–1	(Italy) Roma	1–1	3–0

=== Matches ===
12 March 2015
21:05

Everton (England)	2–1	(Ukraine) Dynamo Kyiv
Naismith 39'; Lukaku 82' (pen.)	Report	Husyev 14'

Goodison Park, Liverpool
Attendance: 26,150
Referee: Carlos Velasco Carballo (Spain)
19 March 2015
19:00

Dynamo Kyiv (Ukraine)	5–2	(England) Everton
Yarmolenko 21'; Teodorczyk 35'; Veloso 37'; Husyev 56'; Antunes 76'	Report	Lukaku 29'; Jagielka 82'

Olympic Stadium, Kyiv
Attendance: 67,553
Referee: Deniz Aytekin (Germany)

Dynamo Kyiv won 6–4 on aggregate.

12 March 2015
19:00

Dnipro Dnipropetrovsk (Ukraine)	1–0	(Netherlands) Ajax
Zozulya 30'	Report

Olympic Stadium, Kyiv
Attendance: 10,581
Referee: Ivan Bebek (Croatia)
19 March 2015
21:05

Ajax (Netherlands)	2–1 (a.e.t.)	(Ukraine) Dnipro Dnipropetrovsk
Bazoer 60'; Van der Hoorn 117'	Report	Konoplyanka 97'

Amsterdam Arena, Amsterdam
Attendance: 51,756
Referee: Aleksei Kulbakov (Belarus)

2–2 on aggregate; Dnipro Dnipropetrovsk won on away goals.

12 March 2015
18:00

Zenit Saint Petersburg (Russia)	2–0	(Italy) Torino
Witsel 38'; Criscito 53'	Report

Petrovsky Stadium, Saint Petersburg
Attendance: 17,271
Referee: Jorge Sousa (Portugal)
19 March 2015
21:05

Torino (Italy)	1–0	(Russia) Zenit Saint Petersburg
Glik 90'	Report

Stadio Olimpico, Turin
Attendance: 24,736
Referee: Matej Jug (Slovenia)

Zenit Saint Petersburg won 2–1 on aggregate.

12 March 2015
19:00

VfL Wolfsburg (Germany)	3–1	(Italy) Internazionale
Naldo 28'; De Bruyne 63', 76'	Report	Palacio 6'

Volkswagen Arena, Wolfsburg
Attendance: 25,374
Referee: Szymon Marciniak (Poland)
19 March 2015
21:05

Internazionale (Italy)	1–2	(Germany) VfL Wolfsburg
Palacio 71'	Report	Caligiuri 24'; Bendtner 89'

San Siro, Milan
Attendance: 38,800
Referee: Mark Clattenburg (England)

VfL Wolfsburg won 5–2 on aggregate.

12 March 2015
21:05

Villarreal (Spain)	1–3	(Spain) Sevilla
Vietto 48'	Report	Vitolo 1'; Mbia 26'; Gameiro 50'

El Madrigal, Villarreal
Attendance: 19,930
Referee: Daniele Orsato (Italy)
19 March 2015
21:05

Sevilla (Spain)	2–1	(Spain) Villarreal
Iborra 69'; Suárez 83'	Report	G. dos Santos 73'

Ramón Sánchez Pizjuán, Seville
Attendance: 28,784
Referee: Martin Atkinson (England)

Sevilla won 5–2 on aggregate.

12 March 2015
21:05

Napoli (Italy)	3–1	(Russia) Dynamo Moscow
Higuaín 25', 31' (pen.), 55'	Report	Kurányi 2'

Stadio San Paolo, Naples
Attendance: 17,727
Referee: Anastasios Sidiropoulos (Greece)
19 March 2015
18:00

Dynamo Moscow (Russia)	0–0	(Italy) Napoli
	Report

Arena Khimki, Khimki
Attendance: 17,356
Referee: Bas Nijhuis (Netherlands)

Napoli won 3–1 on aggregate.

12 March 2015
19:00

Club Brugge (Belgium)	2–1	(Turkey) Beşiktaş
De Sutter 62'; Refaelov 79' (pen.)	Report	Töre 46'

Jan Breydel Stadium, Bruges
Attendance: 12,977
Referee: Craig Thomson (Scotland)
19 March 2015
21:05

Beşiktaş (Turkey)	1–3	(Belgium) Club Brugge
Ramon 48'	Report	De Sutter 61'; Bolingoli-Mbombo 80', 90'

Atatürk Olympic Stadium, Istanbul
Attendance: 65,110
Referee: Sergei Karasev (Russia)

Club Brugge won 5–2 on aggregate.

12 March 2015
21:05

Fiorentina (Italy)	1–1	(Italy) Roma
Iličić 17'	Report	Keita 77'

Stadio Artemio Franchi, Florence
Attendance: 23,357
Referee: Antonio Mateu Lahoz (Spain)
19 March 2015
19:00

Roma (Italy)	0–3	(Italy) Fiorentina
	Report	Gonzalo 10' (pen.); Alonso 18'; Basanta 22'

Stadio Olimpico, Rome
Attendance: 30,591
Referee: Cüneyt Çakır (Turkey)

Fiorentina won 4–1 on aggregate.

== Quarter-finals ==
The draw was held on 20 March 2015.

=== Summary ===
The first legs were played on 16 April, and the second legs were played on 23 April 2015.

Team 1	Agg.	Team 2	1st leg	2nd leg
Sevilla (Spain)	4–3	(Russia) Zenit Saint Petersburg	2–1	2–2
Club Brugge (Belgium)	0–1 (Note: Order of legs reversed after original draw.)	(Ukraine) Dnipro Dnipropetrovsk	0–0	0–1
Dynamo Kyiv (Ukraine)	1–3	(Italy) Fiorentina	1–1	0–2
VfL Wolfsburg (Germany)	3–6	(Italy) Napoli	1–4	2–2

=== Matches ===
16 April 2015
21:05

Sevilla (Spain)	2–1	(Russia) Zenit Saint Petersburg
Bacca 73'; Suárez 88'	Report	Ryazantsev 29'

Ramón Sánchez Pizjuán, Seville
Attendance: 28,450
Referee: Bas Nijhuis (Netherlands)
23 April 2015
21:05

Zenit Saint Petersburg (Russia)	2–2	(Spain) Sevilla
Rondón 48'; Hulk 72'	Report	Bacca 6' (pen.); Gameiro 85'

Petrovsky Stadium, Saint Petersburg
Attendance: 18,121
Referee: Nicola Rizzoli (Italy)

Sevilla won 4–3 on aggregate.

16 April 2015
21:05

Club Brugge (Belgium)	0–0	(Ukraine) Dnipro Dnipropetrovsk
	Report

Jan Breydel Stadium, Bruges
Attendance: 29,000
Referee: Damir Skomina (Slovenia)
23 April 2015
21:05

Dnipro Dnipropetrovsk (Ukraine)	1–0	(Belgium) Club Brugge
Shakhov 82'	Report

Olympic Stadium, Kyiv
Attendance: 16,234
Referee: Alberto Undiano Mallenco (Spain)

Dnipro Dnipropetrovsk won 1–0 on aggregate.

16 April 2015
21:05

Dynamo Kyiv (Ukraine)	1–1	(Italy) Fiorentina
Lens 36'	Report	Babacar 90+2'

Olympic Stadium, Kyiv
Attendance: 65,535
Referee: Szymon Marciniak (Poland)
23 April 2015
21:05

Fiorentina (Italy)	2–0	(Ukraine) Dynamo Kyiv
Gómez 43'; Vargas 90+4'	Report

Stadio Artemio Franchi, Florence
Attendance: 28,058
Referee: Jonas Eriksson (Sweden)

Fiorentina won 3–1 on aggregate.

16 April 2015
21:05

VfL Wolfsburg (Germany)	1–4	(Italy) Napoli
Bendtner 80'	Report	Higuaín 15'; Hamšík 23', 64'; Gabbiadini 77'

Volkswagen Arena, Wolfsburg
Attendance: 25,112
Referee: Antonio Mateu Lahoz (Spain)
23 April 2015
21:05

Napoli (Italy)	2–2	(Germany) VfL Wolfsburg
Callejón 50'; Mertens 65'	Report	Klose 71'; Perišić 73'

Stadio San Paolo, Naples
Attendance: 27,262
Referee: Cüneyt Çakır (Turkey)

Napoli won 6–3 on aggregate.

== Semi-finals ==
The draw was held on 24 April 2015.

=== Summary ===
The first legs were played on 7 May, and the second legs were played on 14 May 2015.

Team 1	Agg.	Team 2	1st leg	2nd leg
Napoli (Italy)	1–2	(Ukraine) Dnipro Dnipropetrovsk	1–1	0–1
Sevilla (Spain)	5–0	(Italy) Fiorentina	3–0	2–0

=== Matches ===
7 May 2015
21:05

Napoli (Italy)	1–1	(Ukraine) Dnipro Dnipropetrovsk
López 50'	Report	Seleznyov 81'

Stadio San Paolo, Naples
Attendance: 41,095
Referee: Svein Oddvar Moen (Norway)
14 May 2015
21:05

Dnipro Dnipropetrovsk (Ukraine)	1–0	(Italy) Napoli
Seleznyov 58'	Report

Olympic Stadium, Kyiv
Attendance: 62,344
Referee: Milorad Mažić (Serbia)

Dnipro Dnipropetrovsk won 2–1 on aggregate.

7 May 2015
21:05

Sevilla (Spain)	3–0	(Italy) Fiorentina
Vidal 17', 52'; Gameiro 75'	Report

Ramón Sánchez Pizjuán, Seville
Attendance: 35,840
Referee: Felix Brych (Germany)
14 May 2015
21:05

Fiorentina (Italy)	0–2	(Spain) Sevilla
	Report	Bacca 22'; Carriço 27'

Stadio Artemio Franchi, Florence
Attendance: 32,466
Referee: Damir Skomina (Slovenia)

Sevilla won 5–0 on aggregate.

== Final ==
The final was played on 27 May 2015 at the National Stadium in Warsaw, Poland. A draw was held on 24 April 2015, after the semi-final draw, to determine the "home" team for administrative purposes.

27 May 2015
20:45

Dnipro Dnipropetrovsk (Ukraine)	2–3	(Spain) Sevilla
Kalinić 7'; Rotan 44'	Report	Krychowiak 28'; Bacca 31', 73'

National Stadium, Warsaw
Attendance: 45,000
Referee: Martin Atkinson (England)
