= Denys Boyko =

Ukrainian footballer

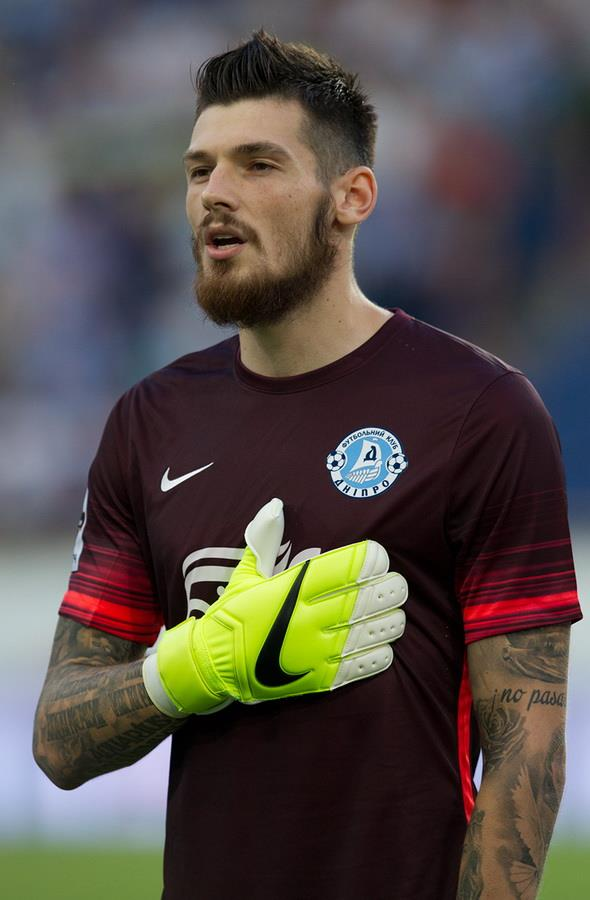
- Boyko with Dnipro Dnipropetrovsk in 2015

Personal information
- Date of birth: 29 January 1988 (age 38)
- Place of birth: Kyiv, Ukrainian SSR, Soviet Union
- Height: 1.97 m (6 ft 6 in)
- Position: Goalkeeper

Youth career
- 2001–2005: Dynamo Kyiv

Senior career*
| Years | Team | Apps | (Gls) |
| 2005–2007 | Dynamo-3 Kyiv | 31 | (0) |
| 2007–2009 | Dynamo-2 Kyiv | 17 | (0) |
| 2009–2013 | Dynamo Kyiv | 11 | (0) |
| 2008 | → CSKA Kyiv (loan) | 16 | (0) |
| 2009 | → Obolon Kyiv (loan) | 15 | (0) |
| 2011–2012 | → Kryvbas (loan) | 26 | (0) |
| 2013–2016 | Dnipro Dnipropetrovsk | 64 | (0) |
| 2016–2018 | Beşiktaş | 3 | (0) |
| 2016–2017 | → Málaga (loan) | 3 | (0) |
| 2018 | → Dynamo Kyiv (loan) | 12 | (0) |
| 2018–2023 | Dynamo Kyiv | 58 | (0) |
| 2023–2024 | Polissya Zhytomyr | 21 | (0) |
| Total | | 277 | (0) |

International career
| 2003 | Ukraine U15 | 3 | (0) |
| 2003–2004 | Ukraine U16 | 5 | (0) |
| 2004–2005 | Ukraine U17 | 7 | (0) |
| 2006 | Ukraine U18 | 1 | (0) |
| 2006–2007 | Ukraine U19 | 7 | (0) |
| 2009–2011 | Ukraine U21 | 8 | (0) |
| 2014–2021 | Ukraine | 7 | (0) |
- * Club domestic league appearances and goals

Denys Oleksandrovych Boyko (Ukrainian: Дени́с Олекса́ндрович Бо́йко; born 29 January 1988) is a Ukrainian former professional footballer who played as a goalkeeper.

== Club career ==
=== Dynamo Kyiv ===
A product of Dynamo Kyiv youth system, Boyko made his senior team debut in a match against Metalurh Zaporizhzhia on 9 May 2010.

=== Dnipro Dnipropetrovsk ===
Boyko played 18 matches in Dnipro's 2014–15 UEFA Europa League campaign, including the final, which they lost 3–2 to holders Sevilla FC in Warsaw.

On 24 November 2015, Boyko was named a UEFA team of the year nominee after conceding just 0.75 goals per a game, the lowest among goal keeper nominees. The other three nominees were Joe Hart of Manchester City and England, Gianluigi Buffon of Juventus and Italy, and Manuel Neuer of Bayern Munich and Germany.

=== Beşiktaş ===
On 21 January 2016, Boyko signed a four-year contract with Turkish club Beşiktaş. On 31 August 2016, he was loaned to La Liga side Málaga CF, for one year.

On 10 February 2018, it was announced that Boyko would return to Dynamo Kyiv on loan, until the end of the 2017–18 season.

=== Dynamo Kyiv ===
After six months on loan back at his native club, Boyko signed a full contract with Dynamo Kyiv.

== International career ==
On 18 November 2014, Boyko made his debut for Ukraine in a 0–0 friendly draw against Lithuania. Since then, Boyko has been the substitute of Shakhtar Donetsk's goalkeeper, Andriy Pyatov.

== Career statistics ==
=== Club ===
Appearances and goals by club, season and competition
| Club | Season | League | | | Cup | | Continental | | Other | | Total | |
| Club | Season | Division | Apps | Goals | Apps | Goals | Apps | Goals | Apps | Goals | Apps | Goals |
|---|---|---|---|---|---|---|---|---|---|---|---|---|
| Dynamo Kyiv | 2009–10 | Ukrainian Premier League | 1 | 0 | — | | — | | — | | 1 | 0 |
| Dynamo Kyiv | 2010–11 | Ukrainian Premier League | 8 | 0 | — | | 3 | 0 | — | | 11 | 0 |
| Dynamo Kyiv | 2012–13 | Ukrainian Premier League | 2 | 0 | — | | — | | — | | 2 | 0 |
| Dynamo Kyiv | Total | | 11 | 0 | — | | 3 | 0 | — | | 14 | 0 |
| Obolon Kyiv (loan) | 2009–10 | Ukrainian Premier League | 15 | 0 | — | | — | | — | | 15 | 0 |
| Kryvbas (loan) | 2011–12 | Ukrainian Premier League | 26 | 0 | — | | — | | — | | 26 | 0 |
| Dnipro Dnipropetrovsk | 2013–14 | Ukrainian Premier League | 28 | 0 | — | | 9 | 0 | — | | 37 | 0 |
| Dnipro Dnipropetrovsk | 2014–15 | Ukrainian Premier League | 21 | 0 | 2 | 0 | 19 | 0 | — | | 42 | 0 |
| Dnipro Dnipropetrovsk | 2015–16 | Ukrainian Premier League | 15 | 0 | 1 | 0 | 6 | 0 | — | | 22 | 0 |
| Dnipro Dnipropetrovsk | Total | | 64 | 0 | 3 | 0 | 34 | 0 | — | | 101 | 0 |
| Beşiktaş | 2015–16 | Süper Lig | 3 | 0 | 2 | 0 | — | | — | | 5 | 0 |
| Málaga (loan) | 2016–17 | La Liga | 3 | 0 | 2 | 0 | — | | — | | 5 | 0 |
| Dynamo Kyiv (loan) | 2017–18 | Ukrainian Premier League | 12 | 0 | 2 | 0 | 4 | 0 | — | | 18 | 0 |
| Dynamo Kyiv | 2018–19 | Ukrainian Premier League | 26 | 0 | 1 | 0 | 13 | 0 | 1 | 0 | 41 | 0 |
| Career total | | | 160 | 0 | 10 | 0 | 54 | 0 | 1 | 0 | 225 | 0 |

=== International ===
Appearances and goals by national team and year
| National team | Year | Apps | Goals |
|---|---|---|---|
| Ukraine | 2014 | 1 | 0 |
| Ukraine | 2015 | 2 | 0 |
| Ukraine | 2016 | 2 | 0 |
| Ukraine | 2017 | 0 | 0 |
| Ukraine | 2018 | 1 | 0 |
| Ukraine | 2019 | 0 | 0 |
| Ukraine | 2020 | 0 | 0 |
| Ukraine | 2021 | 1 | 0 |
| Total | | 7 | 0 |

== Honours ==
Dnipro Dnipropetrovsk

- UEFA Europa League: runner-up 2014–15

Beşiktaş

- Süper Lig: 2015–16

Dynamo Kyiv

- Ukrainian Premier League: 2020–21

Individual

- Ukrainian Premier League Goalkeeper of the Year: 2014–15,
- UEFA Europa League Squad of the Season: 2014–15
