= Jan Laštůvka =

Czech footballer (born 1982)

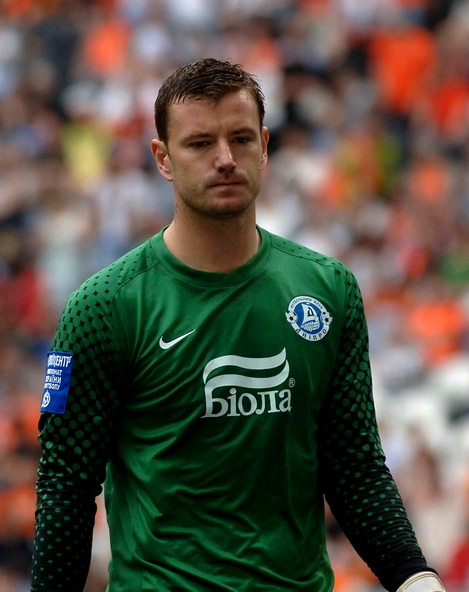
- Laštůvka playing for Dnipro in 2011

Personal information
- Full name: Jan Laštůvka
- Date of birth: 7 July 1982 (age 44)
- Place of birth: Havířov, Czechoslovakia
- Height: 1.91 m (6 ft 3 in)
- Position: Goalkeeper

Youth career
- 1992–1999: FC Karviná

Senior career*
Years	Team	Apps	(Gls)
1999–2000	FC Karviná	3	(0)
2000–2004	Baník Ostrava	79	(0)
2004–2009	Shakhtar Donetsk	37	(0)
2006–2007	→ Fulham (loan)	8	(0)
2007–2008	→ VfL Bochum (loan)	25	(0)
2008–2009	→ West Ham United (loan)	0	(0)
2009–2016	Dnipro Dnipropetrovsk	103	(0)
2016–2017	MFK Karviná	29	(0)
2017	Slavia Prague	15	(0)
2018–2023	Baník Ostrava	152	(0)
Total		451	(0)

International career^{‡}
1998–1999	Czech Republic U-16	4	(0)
1999–2000	Czech Republic U-17	10	(1)
2000–2001	Czech Republic U-18	3	(0)
2002	Czech Republic U-20	1	(0)
2002–2003	Czech Republic U-21	16	(0)
2011–2013	Czech Republic	3	(0)
- * Club domestic league appearances and goals as of 25 May 2023 ‡ National team caps and goals as of 10 May 2022

Jan Laštůvka (born 7 July 1982) is a Czech former professional footballer who last played as a goalkeeper for Baník Ostrava.

== Career ==
Laštůvka was born in Havířov. He started his career at Czech side FC Karviná and moved in summer 2000 to FC Baník Ostrava for four years. In 2003, he won the Talent of the Year award at the Czech Footballer of the Year awards. He won the Czech championship with Baník in the 2003–04 season.

=== Shakhtar Donetsk ===
The next step in his career was Ukrainian top club Shakhtar Donetsk. He played a couple of Champions League and UEFA Cup matches this time.

=== Fulham ===
Laštůvka joined Fulham on loan on 31 August 2006, just prior to the close of the transfer window. He made his Fulham league debut on 2 December 2006 in a 2–0 loss against Blackburn Rovers.

On 1 January 2007, he came on as a second-half substitute for the injured Antti Niemi against Watford, where throughout the game the Fulham fans cheered his every kick or save, as they feared he would make a mistake and cost them the game. The game ended 0–0. He left Fulham in May 2007 to return to his parent club.

=== VfL Bochum ===
In June 2007 Shakhtar loaned Laštůvka to German side VfL Bochum until the end of the 2007–08 season as a replacement for compatriot Jaroslav Drobný, who left the club for Hertha BSC Berlin.

Laštůvka started the season as first-choice keeper, but after some mistakes his position was threatened by the reserve keepers. After an injury, then third-choice keeper René Renno got his place. Renno started quite well but also made some mistakes before the winter break, so coach Marcel Koller claimed that all three keepers (Laštůvka, Renno and Philipp Heerwagen) started at zero in the preparations for the second season half. After the winter break Laštůvka was first-choice again and started with a very good match against Werder Bremen, which was rewarded with a nomination in the "Team of the Day" by Germany's leading football magazine kicker. At the end of the season Bochum were interested in signing him, but, due to the €4 million transfer fee, they signed Portuguese keeper Daniel Fernandes from PAOK instead.

=== West Ham United ===
On 3 August 2008 Laštůvka signed for West Ham on a year-long loan deal. He made his debut for West Ham United in a Football League Cup third round tie away defeat at Watford on 23 September. On 26 May 2009, it was announced that Laštůvka was returning to Shakhtar Donetsk, having made only one appearance for West Ham.

=== Dnipro ===
On 4 August 2009, Laštůvka signed a three-year deal with Ukrainian team FC Dnipro Dnipropetrovsk for €3 million.

In the summer of 2016, he left Dnipro Dnipropetrovsk.

=== Czech First League ===
He rejoined the newly promoted MFK Karviná in the Czech First League as a free agent in 2016. After one year, he moved to SK Slavia Prague on a free transfer to replace Bundesliga-bound Jiří Pavlenka. After only half year later Laštůvka moved back to his former club Baník Ostrava.

== International career ==
Laštůvka was called up to the Czech Republic national football team for the first time in May 2010. He made his full debut at Hampden Park against Scotland in a UEFA Euro 2012 qualifier on 3 September 2011. He was part of the Czech squad which reached the quarter-finals of the tournament before elimination by Portugal, but did not enter the field of play, with Petr Čech playing each match in goal.

== Career statistics ==
Appearances and goals by club, season and competition
Club	Season	League			Cup		League Cup		Europe		Other		Total	
Club	Season	Division	Apps	Goals	Apps	Goals	Apps	Goals	Apps	Goals	Apps	Goals	Apps	Goals
Baník Ostrava	2000–01	Czech First League	0	0	0	0	—		—		—		0	0
Baník Ostrava	2001–02	Czech First League	24	0	0	0	—		—		—		24	0
Baník Ostrava	2002–03	Czech First League	25	0	0	0	—		—		—		25	0
Baník Ostrava	2003–04	Czech First League	30	0	1	0	—		—		—		31	0
Baník Ostrava	Total		79	0	1	0	—		—		—		80	0
Shakhtar Donetsk	2004–05	Ukrainian Premier League	22	0	6	0	—		12	0	1	0	41	0
Shakhtar Donetsk	2005–06	Ukrainian Premier League	13	0	0	0	—		5	0	1	0	19	0
Shakhtar Donetsk	2006–07	Ukrainian Premier League	2	0	0	0	—		0	0	1	0	3	0
Shakhtar Donetsk	Total		37	0	6	0	—		17	0	3	0	63	0
Fulham (loan)	2006–07	Premier League	8	0	3	0	1	0	—		—		12	0
VfL Bochum (loan)	2007–08	Bundesliga	25	0	2	0	—		—		—		27	0
West Ham United (loan)	2008–09	Premier League	0	0	0	0	1	0	—		—		1	0
Dnipro Dnipropetrovsk	2009–10	Ukrainian Premier League	17	0	2	0	—		0	0	—		19	0
Dnipro Dnipropetrovsk	2010–11	Ukrainian Premier League	20	0	4	0	—		0	0	—		24	0
Dnipro Dnipropetrovsk	2011–12	Ukrainian Premier League	27	0	2	0	—		2	0	—		31	0
Dnipro Dnipropetrovsk	2012–13	Ukrainian Premier League	24	0	3	0	—		10	0	—		37	0
Dnipro Dnipropetrovsk	2013–14	Ukrainian Premier League	1	0	1	0	—		1	0	—		3	0
Dnipro Dnipropetrovsk	2014–15	Ukrainian Premier League	5	0	4	0	—		—		—		9	0
Dnipro Dnipropetrovsk	2015–16	Ukrainian Premier League	9	0	5	0	—		0	0	—		14	0
Dnipro Dnipropetrovsk	Total		103	0	21	0	—		13	0	—		137	0
MFK Karviná	2016–17	Czech First League	29	0	0	0	—		—		—		29	0
Slavia Prague	2017–18	Czech First League	15	0	0	0	—		8	0	—		23	0
Baník Ostrava	2017–18	Czech First League	14	0	1	0	—		—		—		15	0
Baník Ostrava	2018–19	Czech First League	35	0	0	0	—		—		—		34	0
Baník Ostrava	2019–20	Czech First League	23	0	2	0	—		—		—		34	0
Baník Ostrava	2020–21	Czech First League	32	0	1	0	—		—		—		32	0
Baník Ostrava	2021–22	Czech First League	24	0	0	0	—		—		—		35	0
Baník Ostrava	2022–23	Czech First League	24	0	1	0	—		—		—		37	0
Baník Ostrava	Total		152	0	5	0	—		—		—		290	0
Career total			448	0	38	0	2	0	38	0	3	0	529	0

== Honours ==
Baník Ostrava

- Czech First League: 2003–04
- Czech Cup runner-up: 2018–19

Shakhtar Donetsk

- Vyshcha Liha: 2004–05, 2005–06
- Ukrainian Super Cup: 2005

Dnipro Dnipropetrovsk

- Ukrainian Premier League runner-up: 2013–14
- UEFA Europa League runner-up: 2014–15
