= Léo Matos =

Brazilian footballer (born 1986)

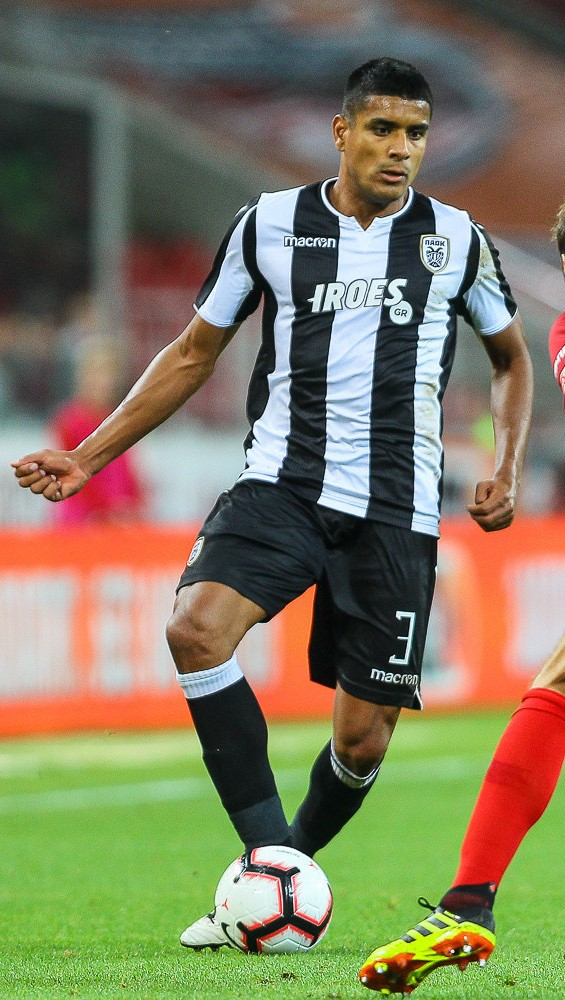
- Matos playing for PAOK in 2018

Personal information
- Full name: Leonardo de Matos Cruz
- Date of birth: 2 April 1986 (age 40)
- Place of birth: Niterói, Brazil
- Height: 1.84 m (6 ft 1/2 in)
- Position: Right back

Team information
- Current team: PAOK (Athletic Director)

Youth career
- 2002–2003: Flamengo

Senior career*
Years	Team	Apps	(Gls)
2004–2007	Marseille	0	(0)
2005–2006	→ Flamengo (loan)	8	(0)
2007–2010	Tombense	10	(5)
2007–2008	→ Paraná (loan)	19	(0)
2008	→ Figueirense (loan)	7	(0)
2009–2010	→ Vila Nova (loan)	22	(13)
2010–2014	Chornomorets Odesa	98	(10)
2014–2016	Dnipro Dnipropetrovsk	26	(1)
2016–2020	PAOK	118	(17)
2020–2022	Vasco da Gama	66	(5)
Total		363	(51)

International career
2003	Brazil U17	6	(1)

Managerial career
- 2023–2026: Vasco da Gama (Technical Director)
- 2026–: PAOK (Athletic Director)
- * Club domestic league appearances and goals as of 28 November 2021

Leonardo "Léo" de Matos Cruz (born 2 April 1986), is a former Brazilian professional footballer who played as a right back.After his retirement he follows his career as Athletic Director in PAOK

== Club career ==
Starting from the academies of Flamengo and having been for a short time in Marseille, Leo Matos did not find his best in this small passage from Europe and fought exclusively in his homeland until 2010, when he moved to Ukraine. In Chornomorets Odesa, he learned to focus in defence and remain faithful to tactics. The Chornomorets coach Roman Hryhorchuk, with whom he worked with, before moved to Dnipro Dnipropetrovsk, was the one who actually helped him to change. "...We watched video every single day, we learned tactics and defense, thinking that in football is not only attack..." has said in an earlier interview. Although he is a full back, he played most of the Chornomorets Odesa matches as a right midfielder, proving he can cover the whole right ring. In summer of 2014, he signed for Dnipro Dnipropetrovsk changing his position to left full back, a quite successful move. He participated in the UEFA Europa League final, where his team lost from Sevilla FC.

=== PAOK ===
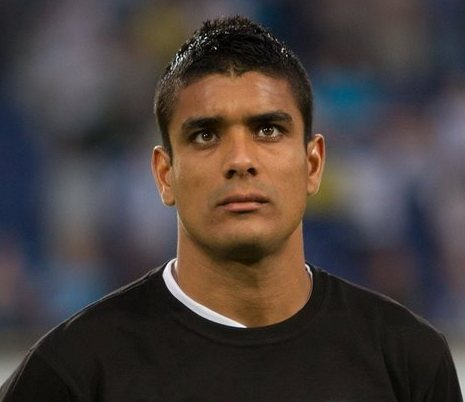
Léo Matos in 2016

On 8 May 2016, the 30-year-old solved his contract with Dnipro Dnipropetrovsk due to serious economic problems of the club and he joined PAOK. The acquisition of the player is expected to be announced after the end of the Super League play-offs and until then all formalities (medical examinations, duration of contract etc.) with the player will take place. On 18 August 2016, in his third appearance for PAOK, Leo Matos scored a wonderful goal helping the club to escape with a 3–0 away win against FC Dinamo Tbilisi in the UEFA Europa League playoffs. On 11 December 2016, he scored a second-half brace (62', 81'), helping his team to win 3–0 against Platanias at Toumba Stadium. On 17 August 2017, he helped PAOK complete a remarkable turnaround and defeat Östersunds FK 3–1 at home scoring a crucial goal in the second half of the 1st leg of the UEFA Europa League play-offs. On 30 September 2017, he scored his first goal for the 2017-18 Super League season in a 1–1 away draw against AEL On 22 October 2017, the club unofficially announced that his contract will be extended till the summer of 2021 with better financial earnings. On 20 December he scored a brace in a 5–1 away Greek Cup win against Trikala On 6 January 2018, he opened the score in a 5–0 home win against Levadiakos., and he repeated a week later in the next matchday in a 3–0 away win against Kerkyra.

On 15 September 2018, he scored his first goal for the 2018–19 Super League season, as he rose highest to head home from a corner in the fifth minute of added time just before the referee blew the half-time whistle, in a 3–1 away win against OFI. On 16 March 2019, he scored as rose to head home Diego Biseswar's right-wing corner with Nikos Giannakopoulos helpless to react in time, sealing a vital 2–1 away win against Panetolikos in his club's rally to win the first championship title since 1985. On 3 April 2019, he scored a brace in the Greek Cup semifinal 1st leg to earn a 2–0 advantage ahead of the second leg against Asteras Tripolis. PAOK were only 1–0 up deep into stoppage time, but after Walter Iglesias received a red card, Matos scored his second goal with a wonderful half-volley which sailed beyond the outstretched grasp of Giorgos Athanasiadis.

On 6 August 2019, in his first official performance for the 2019–20 season, he scored with a powerful header after an assist from Diego Biseswar that emphatically past Ajax goalkeeper Andre Onana, in a home game against last season's UEFA Champions League semi-finalists Ajax in the first leg of their UEFA Champions League third qualifying round tie that ended in a 2–2 draw. On 22 September 2019, scored with a header after a corner from Josip Mišić in a 2–2 home draw with Aris.

On 4 January 2020, Matos scored with a low shot following a free-kick, to close the score in an away 4–2 loss against rivals Aris, as PAOK were finally beaten after 51 games in Super League. At the end of a frustrating 2019-20 season, Leo Matos was one step away from leaving PAOK and lately he was looking for a team to continue his career, but it seems that despite the fact that the Brazilian, was out of Abel Ferreira's initial plans for a long time, the situation is reversed with Matos remaining in Toumba and now stopping the search for another team.

=== Vasco da Gama ===
On 23 October 2020, Leo Matos has agreed a two-year contract with Vasco da Gama and his transfer is expected to be completed immediately, as PAOK informed. The personal problem that Leo Matos has been facing for several months is likely to lead him to Brazil, as the transfer window is open until 9 November. Matos came to PAOK in 2016 from Dnipro and became immediately one of the key players for the club. In four years has 168 appearances with the club in all competitions, scored 26 goals, and had 16 assists. On 2 November 2020 he opened the score in his first appearance with the club in a 1-1 home draw game against Goiás Esporte Clube.

== International career ==
There were talks of possible naturalization of him to play for the Ukraine national football team, and eventually succeeded to gain a second citizenship.

== Career statistics ==
=== Club ===
As of 15 February 2022

Club	Season	League			Cup		Continental		Other		Total	
Club	Season	Division	Apps	Goals	Apps	Goals	Apps	Goals	Apps	Goals	Apps	Goals
Flamengo (loan)	2006	Série A	8	4	—		—		—		8	4
Tombense	2007	Série D	10	5	—		—		—		10	5
Paraná (loan)	2007	Série A	6	0	—		—		—		6	0
Paraná (loan)	2008	Série B	13	0	—		—		—		13	0
Paraná (loan)	Total		19	0	—		—		—		19	0
Figueirense (loan)	2008	Série A	7	0	—		—		—		7	0
Vila Nova (loan)	2009	Série B	8	3	—		—		—		8	3
Vila Nova (loan)	2010	Série B	14	10	—		—		—		14	10
Vila Nova (loan)	Total		22	13	—		—		—		22	13
Chornomorets	2009–10	Premier League	13	0	—		—		—		13	0
Chornomorets	2010–11	First League	16	0	1	0	—		—		17	0
Chornomorets	2011–12	Premier League	19	7	3	1	—		—		22	8
Chornomorets	2012–13	Premier League	28	3	5	2	—		—		33	5
Chornomorets	2013–14	Premier League	22	0	3	0	10 (Note: Appearances in UEFA Europa League.)	0	—		35	0
Chornomorets	Total		98	10	12	3	10	0	—		120	13
Dnipro	2014–15	Premier League	7	0	5	0	10 (Note: Appearances in UEFA Champions League.)	0	—		22	0
Dnipro	2015–16	Premier League	19	1	4	2	6	0	—		29	3
Dnipro	Total		26	1	9	2	16	0	—		51	3
PAOK	2016–17	Super League	31	6	5	1	11	1	—		47	8
PAOK	2017–18	Super League	27	4	7	2	4	1	—		38	7
PAOK	2018–19	Super League	27	3	7	3	11	0	—		45	6
PAOK	2019–20	Super League	30	4	2	0	3	1	—		35	5
PAOK	2020–21	Super League	2	0	0	0	1	0	—		3	0
PAOK	Total		117	17	21	6	30	3	—		168	26
Vasco da Gama	2020	Série A	19	1	0	0	1 (Note: Appearances in Copa Sudamericana.)	0	—		20	1
Vasco da Gama	2021	Série B	29	2	6	0	0	0	3 (Note: Appearances in Taça Guanabara.) (Note: Appearances in Campeonato Carioca.)	1	38	3
Vasco da Gama	2022	Série B	0	0	0	0	0	0	2	0	2	0
Vasco da Gama	Total		48	3	6	0	1	0	5	1	60	4
Career total			355	53	48	11	57	3	5	1	465	68

== Honours ==
Dnipro Dnipropetrovsk

- UEFA Europa League: runner-up 2014–15

PAOK

- Super League Greece: 2018–19
- Greek Cup: 2016–17, 2017–18, 2018–19

Brazil U-17

- FIFA U-17 World Cup: 2003

Individual

- Super League Greece Team of the Season: 2016–17 2017–18
