= Ruslan Rotan =

Ukrainian footballer

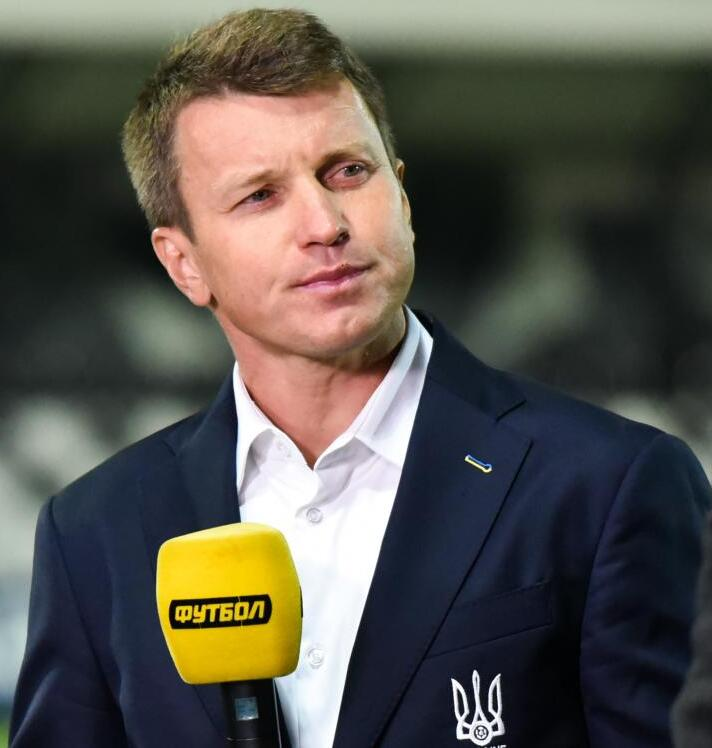
- Rotan as Ukraine U21 coach in 2021

Personal information
- Full name: Ruslan Petrovych Rotan
- Date of birth: 29 October 1981 (age 45)
- Place of birth: Poltava, Ukrainian SSR, Soviet Union
- Height: 1.74 m (5 ft 9 in)
- Position: Midfielder

Team information
- Current team: Polissya Zhytomyr (manager)

Youth career
- Zirka Kirovohrad
- Vorskla Poltava
- 1998–1999: UFK Dnipropetrovsk

Senior career*
Years	Team	Apps	(Gls)
1998–2005	Dnipro Dnipropetrovsk	105	(11)
1998–2002	→ Dnipro-2 Dnipropetrovsk	46	(7)
1991–2002	→ Dnipro-3 Dnipropetrovsk	10	(3)
2005–2008	Dynamo Kyiv	50	(5)
2008–2017	Dnipro Dnipropetrovsk	211	(23)
2017–2018	Slavia Prague	7	(0)
2018	Dynamo Kyiv	9	(0)
Total		438	(49)

International career
2003	Ukraine U21	10	(1)
2003–2018	Ukraine	100	(8)

Managerial career
- 2018: Olimpik Donetsk (assistant)
- 2018–2023: Ukraine U21
- 2022–2025: Oleksandriya
- 2023: Ukraine (interim)
- 2023–2024: Ukraine Olympic
- 2025–: Polissya Zhytomyr
- * Club domestic league appearances and goals

Ruslan Petrovych Rotan (Ukrainian: Руслан Петрович Ротань; born 29 October 1981) is a Ukrainian former professional footballer and current manager of Polissya Zhytomyr. He was a member of the Ukraine national team.

== Club career ==
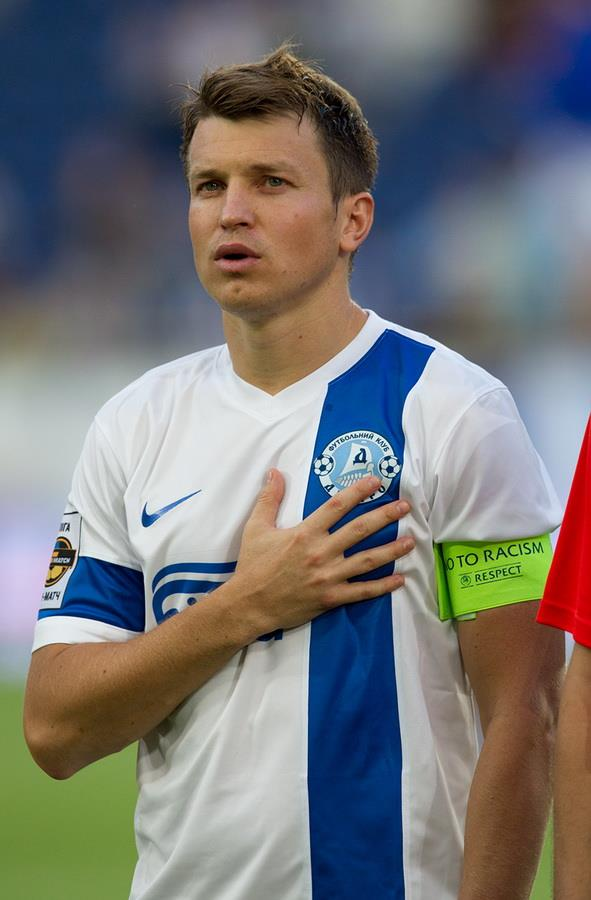
Ruslan with Dnipro Dnipropetrivsk in 2015

Rotan's career started off for Dnipro in the 1999–2000 season. He played a total of 105 matches for Dnipro and scored 11 goals.

He transferred to Dynamo Kyiv in the summer of 2005 and was given the number 14. In Dynamo, he played 50 matches and scored five goals in the Ukrainian Premier League.

During winter break 2007–08 Rotan was transferred back to his home club of Dnipro. The transfer fee was undisclosed. However, he signed a three-year contract with Dnipro. He now wears the number 29 jersey.

He became the top assister of the Ukrainian Premier League of the season 2008–2009.

In the summer of 2014, after his Dnipro contract had expired, Rotan went on trial with Rubin Kazan, nearly signing with the club before turning down the offer due to the political situation around the 2014 Russian military intervention in Ukraine. Rotan eventually signed a new three-year contract with Dnipro on 8 August 2014.

In the 2014–15 season, Rotan helped Dnipro reach the UEFA Europa League Final in Warsaw on 27 May 2015, in which he equalised the score at 2–2 with a free kick against holders Sevilla FC, who eventually won 3–2.

== International career ==
Rotan made his debut for Ukraine on 12 February 2003, replacing Andriy Voronin for the final eight minutes of a goalless friendly against Turkey in İzmir. He scored three goals in seven games in 2006 FIFA World Cup qualification, going on to play three of their five matches (one start) as they reached the quarter-finals at the tournament. When Ukraine hosted UEFA Euro 2012, he played five minutes as a substitute for Voronin in their opening 2–1 victory over Sweden at the Olympic Stadium in Kyiv. With 100 caps, Rotan is Ukraine's third-most capped player of all time. He was also on Ukraine's World cup 2006 squad. In the summer of 2017, Ruslan signed a one-year contract with the Slavia Prague club. He played 7 matches there.

== Career statistics ==
=== Club ===
Appearances and goals by club, season and competition
Club	Season	League			National cup		Europe		Other		Total	
Club	Season	Division	Apps	Goals	Apps	Goals	Apps	Goals	Apps	Goals	Apps	Goals
Dnipro-2 Dnipropetrovsk	1997–98	Druha Liha	2	0	–		–		–		2	0
Dnipro-2 Dnipropetrovsk	1998–99	Druha Liha	16	2	–		–		–		16	2
Dnipro-2 Dnipropetrovsk	1999–2000	Druha Liha	8	3	3	1	–		–		11	4
Dnipro-2 Dnipropetrovsk	2000–01	Persha Liha	5	1	–		–		–		5	1
Dnipro-2 Dnipropetrovsk	2001–02	Persha Liha	15	1	–		–		–		15	1
Dnipro-2 Dnipropetrovsk	Total		46	7	3	1	–		–		49	8
Dnipro-3 Dnipropetrovsk	2000–01	Druha Liha	1	0	–		–		–		1	0
Dnipro-3 Dnipropetrovsk	2001–02	Druha Liha	9	3	–		–		–		9	3
Dnipro Dnipropetrovsk	1999–2000	Vyshcha Liha	10	0	–		–		–		10	0
Dnipro Dnipropetrovsk	2000–01	Vyshcha Liha	7	0	2	0	–		–		9	0
Dnipro Dnipropetrovsk	2001–02	Vyshcha Liha	13	1	5	1	–		–		18	2
Dnipro Dnipropetrovsk	2002–03	Vyshcha Liha	29	5	4	0	–		–		33	5
Dnipro Dnipropetrovsk	2003–04	Vyshcha Liha	25	4	5	0	8 (Note: Appearance(s) in UEFA Cup)	0	–		38	4
Dnipro Dnipropetrovsk	2004–05	Vyshcha Liha	21	1	3	1	7	1	–		31	3
Dnipro Dnipropetrovsk	Total		105	11	19	2	15	1	–		139	14
Dynamo Kyiv	2005–06	Vyshcha Liha	28	4	5	1	2 (Note: Appearance(s) in UEFA Champions League)	0	1 (Note: Appearance in Ukrainian Super Cup)	0	36	5
Dynamo Kyiv	2006–07	Vyshcha Liha	12	1	3	0	4	2	1	0	20	3
Dynamo Kyiv	2007–08	Vyshcha Liha	10	0	3	0	4	0	–		17	0
Dynamo Kyiv	Total		50	5	11	1	10	2	2	0	73	8
Dnipro Dnipropetrovsk	2007–08	Vyshcha Liha	8	0	–		–		–		8	0
Dnipro Dnipropetrovsk	2008–09	Ukrainian Premier League	26	3	–		2 (Note: Appearance(s) in UEFA Europa League)	0	–		28	3
Dnipro Dnipropetrovsk	2009–10	Ukrainian Premier League	26	3	2	0	–		–		28	3
Dnipro Dnipropetrovsk	2010–11	Ukrainian Premier League	21	1	3	0	2	0	–		26	1
Dnipro Dnipropetrovsk	2011–12	Ukrainian Premier League	23	3	2	0	2	0	–		27	3
Dnipro Dnipropetrovsk	2012–13	Ukrainian Premier League	25	4	3	0	10	0	–		38	4
Dnipro Dnipropetrovsk	2013–14	Ukrainian Premier League	26	0	–		8	2	–		27	0
Dnipro Dnipropetrovsk	2014–15	Ukrainian Premier League	16	0	5	2	15	3	–		36	5
Dnipro Dnipropetrovsk	2015–16	Ukrainian Premier League	21	4	5	1	4	0	–		30	5
Dnipro Dnipropetrovsk	2016–17	Ukrainian Premier League	19	5	3	0	–		–		22	5
Dnipro Dnipropetrovsk	Total		211	23	23	3	43	5	–		277	31
Slavia Prague	2017–18	Czech First League	7	0	1	0	6	0	–		14	0
Dynamo Kyiv	2017–18	Ukrainian Premier League	9	0	1	0	–		–		10	0
Career total			438	49	58	7	74	8	2	0	572	64

=== International ===
Scores and results list Ukraine's goal tally first, score column indicates score after each Rotan goal.

List of international goals scored by Ruslan Rotan
No.	Date	Venue	Opponent	Score	Result	Competition
1	8 September 2004	Almaty Central Stadium, Almaty, Kazakhstan	Kazakhstan	2–1	2–1	2006 FIFA World Cup qualification
2	3 September 2005	Mikheil Meskhi Stadium, Tbilisi, Georgia	Georgia	1–0	1–1	2006 FIFA World Cup qualification
3	8 October 2005	Meteor Stadium, Dnipropetrovsk, Ukraine	Albania	2–2	2–2	2006 FIFA World Cup qualification
4	15 August 2006	Valeriy Lobanovskyi Dynamo Stadium, Kyiv, Ukraine	Azerbaijan	3–0	6–0	Friendly
5	6 September 2006	Olimpiyskiy National Sports Complex, Kyiv, Ukraine	Georgia	2–2	3–2	UEFA Euro 2008 qualification
6	22 August 2007	Valeriy Lobanovskyi Dynamo Stadium, Kyiv, Ukraine	Uzbekistan	2–0	2–1	Friendly
7	15 August 2013	Olimpiyskiy National Sports Complex, Kyiv, Ukraine	Israel	1–0	2–0	Friendly
8	9 October 2016	Marshal Józef Piłsudski Stadium, Kraków, Poland	Kosovo	3–0	3–0	2018 FIFA World Cup qualification

=== Managerial ===
As of match played 24 May 2025

Managerial record by team and tenure
Team	Nat	From	To	Record							
Team	Nat	From	To	G	W	D	L	GF	GA	GD	Win %
Ukraine U21	(Ukraine)	27 December 2018	Present	38	18	10	10	62	40	+22	47.37
Oleksandriya	(Ukraine)	21 December 2022	Present	78	32	28	18	95	77	+18	41.03
Ukraine (interim)	(Ukraine)	28 February 2023	4 June 2023	1	0	0	1	0	2	−2	0.00
Ukraine U23	(Ukraine)	4 July 2023	Present	0	0	0	0	0	0	+0	—
Career total				119	51	39	29	161	120	+41	42.86

== Honours ==
=== As a Player ===
Dynamo Kyiv

- Ukrainian Premier League: 2006–07; runner-up: 2005–06
- Ukrainian Cup: 2005–06, 2006–07
- Ukrainian Super Cup: 2006, 2007

Dnipro

- Ukrainian Premier League runner-up: 2013–14
- UEFA Europa League runner-up: 2014–15
- Ukrainian Cup runner-up: 2003–04

Individual

- UEFA Europa League: Squad of the season 2014–15
- Ukrainian Footballer of the Year: 2016

=== As a Coach ===
Individual

- Best Coach of Ukrainian Premier League: 2024–25
- SportArena Coach of the Round: 2025–26 (Round 1, Round 7, Round 10,),
- Ukrainian Premier League Coach of the Round: 2025–26 (Round 7),

== See also ==
- List of men's footballers with 100 or more international caps
