= Valeriy Fedorchuk =

Ukrainian footballer

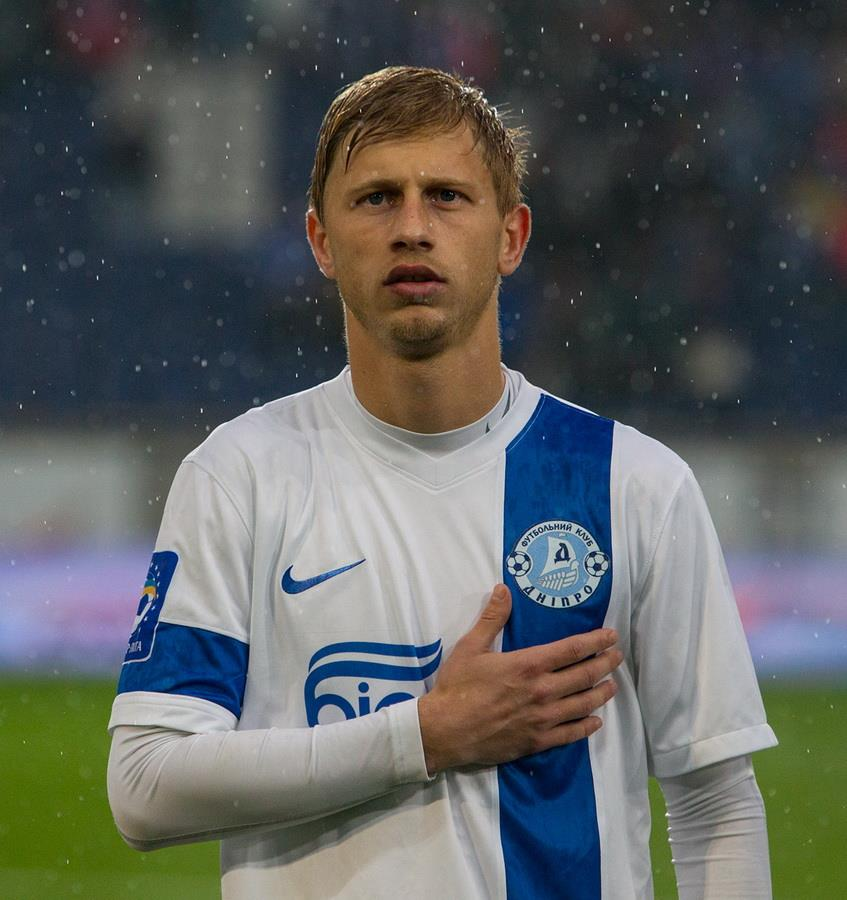
- Portrait of Valeriy Fedorchuk

Personal information
- Full name: Valeriy Yuriyovych Fedorchuk
- Date of birth: 5 October 1988 (age 38)
- Place of birth: Netishyn, Ukrainian SSR (now Ukraine)
- Height: 1.78 m (5 ft 10 in)
- Position: Midfielder

Youth career
- 2001–2002: FC Enerhetyk Netishyn
- 2003–2005: Nyva-Svitanok Vinnytsia

Senior career*
Years	Team	Apps	(Gls)
2005–2007	Kryvbas Kryvyi Rih	0	(0)
2007–2009	Lviv	62	(8)
2010–2016	Dnipro Dnipropetrovsk	29	(1)
2010–2013	→ Kryvbas Kryvyi Rih (loan)	57	(4)
2013–2014	→ Karpaty Lviv (loan)	25	(2)
2014	→ Volyn Lutsk (loan)	11	(0)
2016–2017	Dynamo Kyiv	8	(1)
2017	Veres Rivne	9	(1)
2018	Riga	7	(1)
2018–2020	Mariupol	49	(4)
2020–2023	Rukh Lviv	45	(5)

International career
2008–2011	Ukraine U21	17	(1)
- * Club domestic league appearances and goals

Valeriy Yuriyovych Fedorchuk (Ukrainian: Валерій Юрійович Федорчук; born 5 October 1988) is a retired Ukrainian professional footballer who played as a midfielder.

== Career ==
Fedorchuk was born in Netishyn, Khmelnytskyi Oblast, Ukrainian SSR, Soviet Union. He began his career in the youth side for Svitanok Vinnytsia under head coach Sergey Verich, who scored in his first season 25 goals in the Duflo 71 and in 2005 signed his first professional contract for FC Kryvbas Kryvyi Rih, here earned his first seven professional matches over two years.

In January 2007 Fedorchuk left Kryvbas Kryvyi Rih and signed for FC Lviv who played 29 games, two Cup Matches and scored three goals. On 1 March 2010, he joined Ukrainian Premier League side FC Dnipro Dnipropetrovsk for €480,000 transfer fee, but was initially loaned back to Kryvbas.

On 4 February 2016, Fedorchuk signed a contract with Ukrainian champions Dynamo Kyiv until the end of the 2015–16 season, signing as a free agent after his contract with Dnipro Dnipropetrovsk had expired.

On 21 August 2020, Fedorchuk signed a contract with Ukrainian club Rukh Lviv as a free agent after his contract with Mariupol had expired.

Valeriy announced the end of playing career on 13 March 2023 after 296 total appearances in Ukrainian Premier League.

== International career ==
On 27 May 2008, he earned his first international match for the Ukraine national under-21 football team and presented the team between now in 12 matches and scored one goal.

== Personal life ==
In June 2011, Fedorchuk married broadcaster Olena Kindzerska, daughter of FC Lviv's President Yuriy Kindzerskyi.

== Honors ==
Dnipro Dnipropetrovsk

- UEFA Europa League: runner-up 2014–15

Dynamo Kyiv

- Ukrainian Premier League: 2015–16
- Ukrainian Super Cup: 2016
