= Yevhen Shakhov (footballer, born 1990) =

Ukrainian footballer

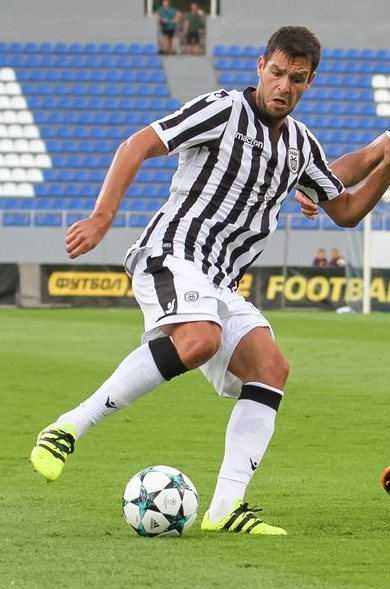
- Shakhov with PAOK in 2017

Personal information
- Full name: Yevhen Yevhenovych Shakhov
- Date of birth: 30 November 1990 (age 35)
- Place of birth: Dnipropetrovsk, Ukrainian SSR
- Height: 1.89 m (6 ft 2 in)
- Position: Central midfielder

Youth career
- 2003–2004: FC Vidradnyi Kyiv
- 2004–2005: FC Zmina-Obolon Kyiv
- 2005–2007: Dnipro Dnipropetrovsk

Senior career*
Years	Team	Apps	(Gls)
2007–2016	Dnipro Dnipropetrovsk	94	(11)
2010	→ Arsenal Kyiv (loan)	3	(1)
2012–2013	→ Arsenal Kyiv (loan)	11	(0)
2016–2019	PAOK	63	(12)
2019–2020	Lecce	24	(1)
2020–2022	AEK Athens	48	(4)
2022–2023	Zorya Luhansk	17	(4)
2023–2024	Tobol Kostanay	19	(1)

International career
2004–2006	Ukraine U16	16	(4)
2005–2007	Ukraine U17	21	(8)
2007	Ukraine U18	1	(0)
2007–2009	Ukraine U19	10	(2)
2010	Ukraine U20	1	(0)
2010–2012	Ukraine U21	20	(3)
2016–2019	Ukraine	7	(1)
Medal record
Men's football
Representing Ukraine
UEFA European Under-19 Championship
Winner	2009 Ukraine
- * Club domestic league appearances and goals as of 12 July 2024

Yevhen Yevhenovych Shakhov (Ukrainian: Євген Євгенович Шахов; born 30 November 1990) is a Ukrainian professional footballer who plays as a central midfielder.

== Club career ==
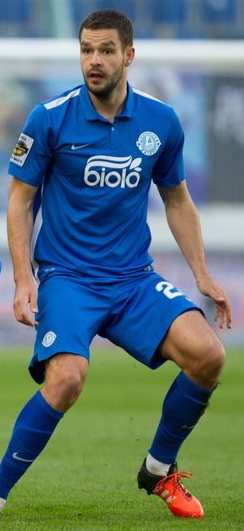
Yevhen Shakhov with Dnipro Dnipropetrovsk in 2016

Born in Dnipropetrovsk, Shakhov debuted on 7 April 2007 against rivals Stal Alchevsk as Dnipro lost 3–1. It was not until the 2010–11 season when his appearance for the Dnipro's senior squad became more regular. On 23 April 2015, on as a half-time substitute for Roman Bezus he scored the only goal of the tie as Dnipro eliminated Brugge to advance to the semi-finals of the UEFA Europa League. He left FC Dnipro Dnipropetrovsk having 127 appearances (17 goals, 13 assists) in all competitions.

=== PAOK ===
On 28 May 2016, the Ukrainian midfielder of Dnipro, whose current contract expires on 30 June 2016, will continue his career in Greece as a member of Super League side PAOK signing a three years' contract for an undisclosed fee.

On 5 March 2017, he scored his first Super League game, in the derby against champions Olympiacos, helping his club to obtain a 2–0 home win. On 27 April 2017, he scored the third goal in Greek Cup semifinals against Panathinaikos in a 4–0 helping his club to be promoted to the final against rivals AEK Athens. On 8 February 2018, he opened the score in a comfortable 3–1 away Greek Cup win against Atromitos helping his club to be promoted to semi-finals. It was his fifth goal for the 2017–18 Greek Football Cup. On 14 April 2018, he opened the score in a comfortable 3–1 home win against Panionios at Toumba Stadium (behind closed doors). On 29 April 2018, he scored in a 3–0 away win against struggling giants Panathinaikos, essentially occupied the second place in the 2017–18 season that leads in the preliminary round of UEFA Champions League.

On 19 January 2019, he scored his first goal for the 2018–19 season as he controlled a neat pass from Mauricio before scoring with a measured shot in a 3–0 home win game against Panionios. On 7 April 2019, Shakhov scored after Diego Biseswar precise cross, and this time the Ukrainian made no mistake with a powerful header in a 3–0 home win game against Lamia. On 21 April 2019, scored a brace as PAOK finally ended their 34-year wait for a league title with a 5–0 win against relegated Levadiakos and win the Super League title. On 24 May 2019, after Fernando Varela declined PAOK's contract renewal offer, Yevhen Shakhov followed suit just one day later. The Ukrainian's contract was set to expire in the summer of 2019 and he met with club officials to discuss a new contract. However, PAOK's offer, reported at as a three-year contract with annual earnings of €700,000 (with bonuses), was nowhere near the 28-year-old's asking price and as a result, negotiations fell through.

=== Lecce ===
On 29 June 2019, he signed a deal with Italian Serie A newcomers Lecce.

=== AEK Athens ===
On 19 September 2020, Shakhov signed a two-year contract with the right to renew by team for one more year with Greek Super League club AEK Athens. On 1 November 2020, he scored his first goal, with an amazing solo effort, to help his team complete their comeback and take a 2–1 home win against OFI.

On 24 January 2021, he opened the score in a 2–2 away draw in the Double-headed eagles derby against PAOK, but didn't celebrate out of respect for his old team. On 27 November 2021, Shakhov came on as a late substitute and scored with a shot from outside the area, sealing a vital 2–1 away win against PAS Giannina.

== International career ==
Shakhov's exceptional season with FC Dnipro Dnipropetrovsk was his passport to be called up by Mykhailo Fomenko to the provisional Euro 2016 squad. He was also called up to the 31-player squad for the 2018 FIFA World Cup qualification match against Iceland on 5 September 2016. On 15 November 2016, he scored his first goal with the Ukraine in a 2–0 home friendly game against Serbia.

== Personal life ==
His father Yevhen Serhiyovych Shakhov was the top scorer of Soviet Top League in 1988 while also playing for Dnipro Dnipropetrovsk.

On 28 February 2022, at a time when the Russian invasion of Ukraine is underway and fighting is raging in Mariupol and on the outskirts of Kiev, the wife of Yevhen Shakhov, who was trapped in the Ukrainian capital, gave birth to their child. In the last few days, in a very advanced pregnancy, she was forced to live in a shelter to protect herself from the Russian attacks, with the AEK midfielder anxious about her fate and being in constant communication with her.

== Career statistics ==
=== Club ===
As of match played 22 May 2022

Appearances and goals by club, season and competition
Club	Season	League			Cup		Continental		Other		Total	
Club	Season	Division	Apps	Goals	Apps	Goals	Apps	Goals	Apps	Goals	Apps	Goals
Dnipro Dnipropetrovsk	2006–07	Ukrainian Premier League	5	0	—		—		—		5	0
Dnipro Dnipropetrovsk	2007–08	Ukrainian Premier League	5	0	1	0	—		—		6	0
Dnipro Dnipropetrovsk	2008–09	Ukrainian Premier League	9	1	—		—		—		9	1
Dnipro Dnipropetrovsk	2009–10	Ukrainian Premier League	5	0	1	0	—		—		6	0
Dnipro Dnipropetrovsk	2010–11	Ukrainian Premier League	19	2	4	1	1 (Note: Appearance(s) in UEFA Europa League)	0	—		24	3
Dnipro Dnipropetrovsk	2011–12	Ukrainian Premier League	17	0	1	0	1	1	—		19	1
Dnipro Dnipropetrovsk	2012–13	Ukrainian Premier League	4	1	1	0	—		—		5	1
Dnipro Dnipropetrovsk	2013–14	Ukrainian Premier League	3	0	1	0	3	1	—		7	1
Dnipro Dnipropetrovsk	2014–15	Ukrainian Premier League	17	3	6	1	11	2	—		34	6
Dnipro Dnipropetrovsk	2015–16	Ukrainian Premier League	10	4	4	0	2	1	—		16	5
Dnipro Dnipropetrovsk	Total		94	11	19	2	18	5	—		131	18
Arsenal Kyiv (loan)	2009–10	Ukrainian Premier League	3	1	—		—		—		3	1
Arsenal Kyiv (loan)	2012–13	Ukrainian Premier League	11	0	1	0	2	0	—		14	0
PAOK	2016–17	Super League Greece	23	4	9	3	12 (Note: Two appearances in UEFA Champions League, ten appearances and one goal in UEFA Europa League)	1	—		44	8
PAOK	2017–18	Super League Greece	19	3	10	5	4	0	—		33	8
PAOK	2018–19	Super League Greece	21	5	9	0	10 (Note: Six appearances in the UEFA Champions League, four appearances in UEFA Europa League)	0	—		40	5
PAOK	Total		63	12	28	8	26	1	—		117	21
Lecce	2019–20	Serie A	24	1	0	0	—		—		24	1
AEK Athens	2020–21	Super League Greece	25	3	3	0	7	0	—		35	3
AEK Athens	2021–22	Super League Greece	23	1	1	0	2	0	—		26	1
AEK Athens	Total		48	4	4	0	9	0	—		61	4
Career total			243	29	52	10	55	6	0	0	350	45

=== International ===
Appearances and goals by national team and year
National team	Year	Apps	Goals
Ukraine	2016	3	1
Ukraine	2017	2	0
Ukraine	2019	2	0
Total		7	1

Scores and results list Ukraine's goal tally first.

International goals by date, venue, cap, opponent, score, result and competition
No.	Date	Venue	Cap	Opponent	Score	Result	Competition
1	15 November 2016	Metalist Stadium, Kharkiv, Ukraine	3	Serbia	1–0	2–0	Friendly match

== Honours ==
Dnipro Dnipropetrovsk

- UEFA Europa League runners-up: 2014–15

PAOK

- Super League Greece: 2018–19
- Greek Cup: 2016–17, 2017–18, 2018–19

Ukraine

- UEFA European Under-19 Football Championship: 2009
