= 2006 UEFA European Under-21 Championship squads =

Football team member listings

National squads of the 2006 UEFA European Under-21 Championship. Players in bold have now been capped at full International level.

== Group A ==
=== France ===
Head coach: René Girard

No.	Pos.	Player	Date of birth (age)	Caps	Club
1	GK	Jérémy Gavanon	20 September 1983 (aged 22)		(France) Marseille
2	MF	**Lucien Aubey**	24 May 1984 (aged 21)		(France) Toulouse
3	DF	Jean-Michel Badiane	9 May 1983 (aged 23)		(France) Paris Saint-Germain
4	DF	Jérémy Berthod	24 April 1984 (aged 22)		(France) Lyon
5	DF	Grégory Bourillon	1 July 1984 (aged 21)		(France) Rennes
6	DF	**François Clerc**	18 April 1983 (aged 23)		(France) Lyon
7	MF	Olivier Veigneau	16 July 1985 (aged 20)		(France) Monaco
8	MF	**Jacques Faty**	25 February 1984 (aged 22)		(France) Rennes
9	MF	**Bacary Sagna**	14 February 1983 (aged 23)		(France) Auxerre
10	DF	**Lassana Diarra**	10 March 1985 (aged 21)		(England) Chelsea
11	FW	**Julien Faubert**	1 August 1983 (aged 22)		(France) Bordeaux
12	GK	**Steve Mandanda**	28 March 1985 (aged 21)		(France) Le Havre
13	FW	**Yoann Gourcuff**	11 July 1986 (aged 19)		(France) Rennes
14	MF	**Rio Mavuba**	8 March 1984 (aged 22)		(France) Bordeaux
15	DF	**Jérémy Toulalan**	10 September 1983 (aged 22)		(France) Nantes
16	MF	**Mathieu Flamini**	7 March 1984 (aged 22)		(England) Arsenal
17	MF	Bryan Bergougnoux	12 January 1983 (aged 23)		(France) Toulouse
18	FW	**Jimmy Briand**	2 August 1985 (aged 20)		(France) Rennes
19	DF	Yoan Gouffran	25 May 1986 (aged 19)		(France) Caen
20	MF	Anthony Le Tallec	3 October 1984 (aged 21)		(England) Liverpool
21	FW	**Florent Sinama Pongolle**	20 October 1984 (aged 21)		(England) Liverpool
22	GK	Simon Pouplin	28 May 1985 (aged 20)		(France) Rennes

=== Germany ===
Head coach: Dieter Eilts

No.	Pos.	Player	Date of birth (age)	Caps	Club
1	GK	Michael Rensing	14 May 1984 (aged 22)		(Germany) Bayern Munich
2	DF	Moritz Volz	21 January 1983 (aged 23)		(England) Fulham
3	DF	**Malik Fathi**	29 October 1983 (aged 22)		(Germany) Hertha BSC
4	DF	**Marvin Matip**	25 September 1985 (aged 20)		(Germany) 1. FC Köln
5	DF	Markus Brzenska	25 May 1984 (aged 21)		(Germany) Borussia Dortmund
6	DF	**Christian Schulz**	1 April 1983 (aged 23)		(Germany) Werder Bremen
7	FW	Ioannis Masmanidis	9 March 1983 (aged 23)		(Germany) Arminia Bielefeld
8	MF	Matthias Lehmann	28 May 1983 (aged 22)		(Germany) 1860 Munich
9	FW	**Stefan Kießling**	25 January 1984 (aged 22)		(Germany) 1. FC Nürnberg
10	FW	Christian Eigler	1 January 1984 (aged 22)		(Germany) Greuther Fürth
11	FW	**Nando Rafael**	10 January 1984 (aged 22)		(Germany) Borussia Mönchengladbach
12	GK	Patrick Platins	19 April 1983 (aged 23)		(Germany) VfL Wolfsburg
13	FW	**Patrick Helmes**	1 March 1984 (aged 22)		(Germany) 1. FC Köln
14	MF	**Gonzalo Castro**	1 June 1987 (aged 18)		(Germany) Bayer Leverkusen
15	MF	Alexander Meier	17 January 1983 (aged 23)		(Germany) Eintracht Frankfurt
16	MF	**Roberto Hilbert**	16 October 1984 (aged 21)		(Germany) Greuther Fürth
17	DF	Patrick Ochs	14 May 1984 (aged 22)		(Germany) Eintracht Frankfurt
18	MF	Peter Niemeyer	22 November 1983 (aged 22)		(Netherlands) Twente
19	MF	**Eugen Polanski**	17 March 1986 (aged 20)		(Germany) Borussia Mönchengladbach
20	DF	**Lukas Sinkiewicz**	9 October 1985 (aged 20)		(Germany) 1. FC Köln
21	GK	Florian Fromlowitz	2 July 1986 (aged 19)		(Germany) 1. FC Kaiserslautern
22	MF	**Sascha Riether**	23 March 1983 (aged 23)		(Germany) SC Freiburg

=== Portugal ===
Head coach: Agostinho Oliveira

No.	Pos.	Player	Date of birth (age)	Caps	Club
1	GK	**Bruno Vale**	8 April 1983 (aged 23)		(Portugal) Porto
2	DF	**Nélson**	10 June 1983 (aged 22)		(Portugal) Benfica
3	MF	**Raul Meireles**	17 March 1983 (aged 23)		(Portugal) Porto
4	DF	José Semedo	11 January 1985 (aged 21)		(Portugal) Sporting CP
5	DF	Pedro Ribeiro	25 January 1983 (aged 23)		(Portugal) Porto
6	DF	**Zé Castro**	13 January 1983 (aged 23)		(Portugal) Académica de Coimbra
7	FW	**Ricardo Quaresma** (captain)	26 September 1983 (aged 22)		(Portugal) Porto
8	MF	**Manuel Fernandes**	5 February 1986 (aged 20)		(Portugal) Benfica
9	FW	**Hugo Almeida**	23 May 1984 (aged 22)		(Portugal) Porto
10	MF	**João Moutinho**	8 September 1986 (aged 19)		(Portugal) Sporting CP
11	MF	Diogo Valente	23 September 1984 (aged 21)		(Portugal) Boavista
12	GK	Paulo Ribeiro	6 March 1984 (aged 22)		(Portugal) Porto
13	DF	**Rolando**	31 August 1985 (aged 20)		(Portugal) Belenenses
14	MF	**Custódio**	24 May 1983 (aged 22)		(Portugal) Sporting CP
15	DF	Nuno Morais	29 January 1984 (aged 22)		(England) Chelsea
16	MF	Bruno Amaro	17 February 1983 (aged 23)		(Portugal) Penafiel
17	FW	**Silvestre Varela**	2 February 1985 (aged 21)		(Portugal) Sporting CP
18	MF	**Nani**	17 November 1986 (aged 19)		(Portugal) Sporting CP
19	FW	Ricardo Vaz Tê	1 October 1986 (aged 19)		(England) Bolton Wanderers
20	FW	**Lourenço**	5 June 1983 (aged 22)		(Portugal) Sporting CP
21	FW	Filipe Oliveira	27 May 1984 (aged 21)		(Portugal) Marítimo
22	GK	**Daniel Fernandes**	25 September 1983 (aged 22)		(Greece) PAOK

=== Serbia and Montenegro ===
Head coach: Dragan Okuka

No.	Pos.	Player	Date of birth (age)	Caps	Club
1	GK	**Vladimir Stojković** (captain)	28 July 1983 (aged 22)		(Serbia and Montenegro) Red Star Belgrade
2	DF	**Branislav Ivanović**	22 February 1984 (aged 22)		(Russia) Lokomotiv Moscow
3	DF	**Duško Tošić**	19 January 1985 (aged 21)		(France) Sochaux
4	MF	**Nemanja Rnić**	30 September 1984 (aged 21)		(Serbia and Montenegro) Partizan
5	DF	**Milan Stepanov**	2 April 1983 (aged 23)		(Turkey) Trabzonspor
6	DF	**Milan Biševac**	31 August 1983 (aged 22)		(Serbia and Montenegro) Red Star Belgrade
7	MF	**Nenad Milijaš**	30 April 1983 (aged 23)		(Serbia and Montenegro) Red Star Belgrade
8	FW	**Boško Janković**	1 March 1984 (aged 22)		(Serbia and Montenegro) Red Star Belgrade
9	FW	**Mirko Vučinić**	1 October 1983 (aged 22)		(Italy) Lecce
10	MF	**Simon Vukčević**	29 January 1986 (aged 20)		(Russia) Saturn Ramenskoe
11	MF	Miloš Pavlović	27 November 1983 (aged 22)		(Serbia and Montenegro) Voždovac
12	GK	Aleksandar Jović	5 March 1986 (aged 20)		(Serbia and Montenegro) Zeta
13	DF	**Marko Lomić**	13 September 1983 (aged 22)		(Serbia and Montenegro) Partizan
14	MF	**Stefan Babović**	7 January 1987 (aged 19)		(Serbia and Montenegro) Partizan
15	MF	**Dejan Milovanović**	21 January 1984 (aged 22)		(Serbia and Montenegro) Red Star Belgrade
16	FW	Đorđe Rakić	31 October 1985 (aged 20)		(Serbia and Montenegro) OFK Beograd
17	MF	**Miloš Krasić**	1 November 1984 (aged 21)		(Russia) CSKA Moscow
18	DF	**Dušan Basta**	18 August 1984 (aged 21)		(Serbia and Montenegro) Red Star Belgrade
19	MF	Ivan Todorović	29 July 1983 (aged 22)		(Serbia and Montenegro) Zeta
20	FW	**Milan Purović**	7 May 1985 (aged 21)		(Serbia and Montenegro) Red Star Belgrade
21	FW	**Igor Burzanović**	25 August 1985 (aged 20)		(Serbia and Montenegro) Budućnost Podgorica
22	GK	Miroslav Vujadinović	22 April 1983 (aged 23)		(Serbia and Montenegro) Budućnost Podgorica

== Group B ==
=== Denmark ===
Head coach: Flemming Serritslev

No.	Pos.	Player	Date of birth (age)	Caps	Goals	Club
1	GK	Kevin Stuhr Ellegaard	23 May 1983 (aged 23)	17	0	(German Football Association) Hertha BSC
2	DF	**Michael Jakobsen**	2 January 1986 (aged 20)	10	0	(Danish Football Association) AaB
3	DF	**Leon Andreasen**	23 April 1983 (aged 23)	20	5	(German Football Association) Werder Bremen
4	DF	**Daniel Agger**	12 December 1984 (aged 21)	7	3	(The Football Association) Liverpool
5	DF	Martin Pedersen	9 October 1983 (aged 22)	27	0	(Danish Football Association) AaB
6	MF	**Rasmus Würtz** (captain)	18 September 1983 (aged 22)	26	0	(Danish Football Association) AaB
7	MF	Martin Bergvold	20 February 1984 (aged 22)	11	2	(Danish Football Association) Copenhagen
8	MF	Jacob Sørensen	12 February 1983 (aged 23)	16	2	(Danish Football Association) AaB
9	FW	**Jonas Kamper**	3 May 1983 (aged 23)	36	3	(Danish Football Association) Brøndby
10	MF	**Thomas Kahlenberg**	20 March 1983 (aged 23)	23	7	(French Football Federation) Auxerre
11	FW	**Morten Rasmussen**	31 January 1985 (aged 21)	17	8	(Danish Football Association) Brøndby
12	DF	**Jakob Poulsen**	7 July 1983 (aged 22)	16	1	(Royal Dutch Football Association) Heerenveen
13	MF	**Niki Zimling**	19 April 1985 (aged 21)	1	0	(Danish Football Association) Esbjerg
14	DF	Henrik Kildentoft	18 March 1985 (aged 21)	7	0	(Danish Football Association) Brøndby
15	DF	Frank Hansen	23 February 1983 (aged 23)	9	0	(Danish Football Association) Esbjerg
16	GK	Theis F. Rasmussen	12 July 1984 (aged 21)	3	0	(Danish Football Association) Vejle
17	DF	Jonas Troest	4 March 1985 (aged 21)	19	0	(German Football Association) Hannover 96
18	MF	**Mikkel Thygesen**	22 October 1984 (aged 21)	8	1	(Danish Football Association) Midtjylland
19	FW	**Johan Absalonsen**	16 September 1985 (aged 20)	7	1	(Danish Football Association) Brøndby
20	FW	**Simon Busk Poulsen**	7 October 1984 (aged 21)	7	0	(Danish Football Association) Midtjylland
21	FW	**Nicklas Bendtner**	16 January 1988 (aged 18)	1	2	(The Football Association) Arsenal
22	GK	Jesper Hansen	31 March 1985 (aged 21)	0	0	(Danish Football Association) Nordsjælland

=== Italy ===
Head coach: Claudio Gentile

No.	Pos.	Player	Date of birth (age)	Caps	Club
1	GK	Federico Agliardi	11 February 1983 (aged 23)		(Italy) Palermo
2	DF	Alessandro Potenza	8 March 1984 (aged 22)		(Italy) Internazionale
3	DF	Cesare Bovo (c)	14 January 1983 (aged 23)		(Italy) Roma
4	MF	Marco Donadel	21 April 1983 (aged 23)		(Italy) Fiorentina
5	DF	Andrea Mantovani	22 June 1984 (aged 21)		(Italy) Chievo
6	DF	**Giorgio Chiellini**	14 August 1984 (aged 21)		(Italy) Juventus
7	FW	**Simone Pepe**	30 August 1983 (aged 22)		(Italy) Udinese
8	DF	Michele Canini	5 June 1985 (aged 20)		(Italy) Cagliari
9	FW	Rolando Bianchi	15 February 1983 (aged 23)		(Italy) Reggina
10	MF	**Davide Biondini**	24 January 1983 (aged 23)		(Italy) Reggina
11	FW	**Gianpaolo Pazzini**	2 August 1984 (aged 21)		(Italy) Fiorentina
12	GK	Antonio Mirante	8 July 1983 (aged 22)		(Italy) Juventus
13	DF	Andrea Coda	25 April 1985 (aged 21)		(Italy) Empoli
14	MF	Marino Defendi	19 August 1985 (aged 20)		(Italy) Atalanta
15	DF	Giuseppe Scurto	5 January 1984 (aged 22)		(Italy) Chievo
16	DF	Damiano Ferronetti	1 November 1984 (aged 21)		(Italy) Parma
17	MF	**Pasquale Foggia**	3 June 1983 (aged 22)		(Italy) Milan
18	MF	**Riccardo Montolivo**	18 January 1985 (aged 21)		(Italy) Fiorentina
19	FW	**Raffaele Palladino**	17 April 1984 (aged 22)		(Italy) Juventus
20	MF	**Alessandro Rosina**	31 January 1984 (aged 22)		(Italy) Torino
21	MF	Paolo Sammarco	17 March 1983 (aged 23)		(Italy) Chievo
22	GK	Gianluca Curci	12 July 1985 (aged 20)		(Italy) Roma

=== Netherlands ===
Head coach: Foppe de Haan

No.	Pos.	Player	Date of birth (age)	Caps	Club
1	GK	**Kenneth Vermeer**	10 January 1986 (aged 20)		(Netherlands) Ajax
2	DF	**Paul Verhaegh**	1 September 1983 (aged 22)		(Netherlands) Vitesse
3	DF	Gijs Luirink	12 September 1983 (aged 22)		(Netherlands) Groningen
4	DF	Ramon Zomer	13 April 1983 (aged 23)		(Netherlands) Twente
5	DF	**Urby Emanuelson**	16 June 1986 (aged 19)		(Netherlands) Ajax
6	MF	**Stijn Schaars** (captain)	11 January 1984 (aged 22)		(Netherlands) AZ
7	FW	**Romeo Castelen**	3 May 1983 (aged 23)		(Netherlands) Feyenoord
8	MF	**Nicky Hofs**	17 May 1983 (aged 23)		(Netherlands) Feyenoord
9	FW	**Klaas-Jan Huntelaar**	12 August 1983 (aged 22)		(Netherlands) Ajax
10	MF	**Ismaïl Aissati**	16 August 1988 (aged 17)		(Netherlands) PSV
11	FW	Daniël de Ridder	6 March 1984 (aged 22)		(Spain) Celta Vigo
12	MF	**Haris Medunjanin**	8 March 1985 (aged 21)		(Netherlands) AZ
13	FW	Patrick Gerritsen	13 March 1987 (aged 19)		(Netherlands) Twente
14	FW	**Collins John**	17 October 1985 (aged 20)		(England) Fulham
15	FW	Fred Benson	10 April 1984 (aged 22)		(Netherlands) Vitesse
16	DF	**Dwight Tiendalli**	21 October 1985 (aged 20)		(Netherlands) Utrecht
17	DF	**Ron Vlaar**	16 February 1985 (aged 21)		(Netherlands) Feyenoord
18	DF	Arnold Kruiswijk	2 November 1984 (aged 21)		(Netherlands) Groningen
19	DF	**Edson Braafheid**	8 April 1983 (aged 23)		(Netherlands) Utrecht
20	MF	**Demy de Zeeuw**	26 May 1983 (aged 22)		(Netherlands) AZ
21	GK	**Michel Vorm**	20 October 1983 (aged 22)		(Netherlands) Utrecht
22	GK	**Remko Pasveer**	8 November 1983 (aged 22)		(Netherlands) Twente

=== Ukraine ===
Head coach: Oleksiy Mykhaylychenko

No.	Pos.	Player	Date of birth (age)	Caps	Club
1	GK	**Andriy Pyatov**	28 June 1984 (aged 21)		(Ukraine) Vorskla Poltava
2	DF	**Oleksandr Romanchuk**	21 October 1984 (aged 21)		(Ukraine) Dynamo Kyiv
3	DF	**Mykola Ischenko**	9 March 1983 (aged 23)		(Ukraine) Karpaty Lviv
4	DF	Dmytro Nevmyvaka	19 March 1984 (aged 22)		(Ukraine) Metalurh Zaporizhzhya
5	DF	**Oleksandr Yatsenko** (captain)	24 February 1985 (aged 21)		(Ukraine) Dynamo Kyiv
6	DF	**Dmytro Chyhrynskyi**	7 November 1986 (aged 19)		(Ukraine) Shakhtar Donetsk
7	FW	Maksym Feschuk	25 November 1985 (aged 20)		(Ukraine) Karpaty Lviv
8	FW	**Oleksandr Aliyev**	3 February 1985 (aged 21)		(Ukraine) Dynamo Kyiv
9	MF	**Adrian Pukanych**	22 June 1983 (aged 22)		(Ukraine) Shakhtar Donetsk
10	FW	**Artem Milevskyi**	12 January 1985 (aged 21)		(Ukraine) Dynamo Kyiv
11	FW	Ruslan Fomyn	2 March 1986 (aged 20)		(Ukraine) Shakhtar Donetsk
12	GK	**Oleksandr Rybka**	10 April 1987 (aged 19)		(Ukraine) Dynamo Kyiv
13	MF	Serhiy Pylypchuk	26 November 1984 (aged 21)	2	(Russia) Spartak Nalchik
14	MF	**Yevhen Cheberyachko**	19 June 1983 (aged 22)		(Ukraine) Arsenal Kyiv
15	DF	**Hryhoriy Yarmash**	4 January 1985 (aged 21)		(Ukraine) Dynamo Kyiv
16	FW	Ivan Kryvosheyenko	11 May 1984 (aged 22)	0	(Ukraine) Illychivets Mariupol
17	DF	**Taras Mykhalyk**	28 October 1983 (aged 22)		(Ukraine) Dynamo Kyiv
18	MF	Oleksiy Hodin	2 February 1983 (aged 23)		(Ukraine) Metalurh Zaporizhzhya
19	MF	**Oleksandr Maksymov**	13 February 1985 (aged 21)		(Ukraine) Kharkiv
20	MF	Oleksandr Sytnyk	2 January 1985 (aged 21)		(Ukraine) Dynamo Kyiv
21	MF	Andriy Oberemko	18 March 1984 (aged 22)		(Ukraine) Kharkiv
22	GK	Yevhen Shyryayev	22 February 1984 (aged 22)		(Ukraine) Chornomorets Odesa
