= 2009–10 Ukrainian Premier League =

19th season of top-tier football league in Vyshcha Liha

Ukrainian Premier League
- Season: 2009–10
- Champions: Shakhtar Donetsk; 5th title
- Relegated: Zakarpattia; Chornomorets
- Champions League: Shakhtar; Dynamo
- Europa League: Tavriya Simferopol; Metalist Kharkiv; Dnipro Dnipropetrovsk; Karpaty Lviv
- Matches: 240
- Goals: 597 (2.49 per match)
- Top goalscorer: (17) Artem Milevskyi (Dynamo)
- Biggest home win: Dynamo 6–0 Tavriya (Round 2)
- Biggest away win: Arsenal 1–6 Tavriya (Round 25)
- Highest scoring: Arsenal 1–6 Tavriya (Round 25)
- Longest winning run: 10 – Shakhtar (Round 14–23)
- Longest unbeaten run: 20 – Dynamo (Round 1–15, 17–21)
- Longest losing run: 7 – Kryvbas (Round 1–7)
- Highest attendance: 52,518 Shakhtar – Dynamo (Round 29)
- Lowest attendance: 500; Vorskla – Metalurh Don. (Round 10); Kryvbas – Metalurh Zap. (Round 17); Arsenal – Chornomorets (Round 17)

The 2009–10 Ukrainian Premier League season was the nineteenth since its establishment and second since its reorganization. Dynamo Kyiv were the defending champions, having won their 13th league title. A total of 16 teams participated in the league, 14 of which participated in the 2008–09 season, and two of which were promoted from the Ukrainian First League.

The season began on 17 July 2009. The winter break in the season was from 13 December 2009 until 28 February 2010. The last round of the season was played on 9 May 2010.

On 5 May 2010, Shakhtar Donetsk regained the title after a 1–0 win against rivals Dynamo Kyiv.

== Teams ==
=== Promoted ===
- FC Zakarpattia Uzhhorod, champion of the 2008–09 Ukrainian First League – (returning after absence of a season)
- FC Obolon Kyiv, runner-up of the 2008–09 Ukrainian First League – (returning after absence of 4 seasons)

=== Location map ===
Locations of team home grounds in Ukrainian Premier League 2009–10

== Managers and captains ==
Club	Coach	Captain	Replaced coach(es)
Arsenal Kyiv	(Ukraine) Yuriy Bakalov (caretaker)	(Ukraine) Vitaliy Reva	(Ukraine) Vyacheslav Hrozny (Ukraine) Oleksandr Zavarov (Ukraine) Vasyl Yevseyev
Chornomorets Odesa	(Ukraine) Andriy Bal	(Ukraine) Vitaliy Rudenko	(Ukraine) Ihor Nakonechny (Ukraine) Viktor Hryshko
Dnipro Dnipropetrovsk	(Ukraine) Volodymyr Bezsonov	(Ukraine) Andriy Rusol	
Dynamo Kyiv	(Russia) Valery Gazzayev	(Ukraine) Artem Milevskyi	
Illichivets Mariupol	(Ukraine) Ilya Bliznyuk	(Ukraine) Vadym Melnyk	
Karpaty Lviv	(Russia) Oleg Kononov	(Ukraine) Andriy Tlumak	
Kryvbas Kryvyi Rih	(Ukraine) Yuriy Maksymov	(Ukraine) Serhiy Danylovskyi	(Ukraine) Oleh Taran
Metalist Kharkiv	(Ukraine) Myron Markevych	(Ukraine) Oleksandr Horyainov	
Metalurh Donetsk	(Bulgaria) Nikolay Kostov	(Ukraine) Vyacheslav Checher	
Metalurh Zaporizhya	(Ukraine) Roman Hryhorchuk	(Ukraine) Dmytro Nevmyvaka	(Russia) Vladimir Khodus (Ukraine) Roman Hryhorchuk (Ukraine) Oleh Lutkov
Obolon Kyiv	(Ukraine) Serhiy Kovalets	(Ukraine) Andriy Konyushenko	(Ukraine) Yuriy Maksymov
Shakhtar Donetsk	(Romania) Mircea Lucescu	(Croatia) Darijo Srna	
Tavriya Simferopol	(Ukraine) Serhiy Puchkov	(Ukraine) Oleksandr Kovpak	
Vorskla Poltava	(Ukraine) Mykola Pavlov	(Ukraine) Hennadiy Medvedyev	
Zakarpattia Uzhhorod	(Russia) Igor Gamula	(Ukraine) Oleksandr Chizhevskiy	
Zorya Luhansk	(Ukraine) Anatoly Chantsev	(Ukraine) Volodymyr Yezerskiy	(Ukraine) Yuriy Koval (Ukraine) Yuriy Dudnyk

Note:

- At the start of the season, Artem Milevskyi was selected to captain the side by manager Gazzayev, but on signing Andriy Shevchenko before Round 6, club president Ihor Surkis appointed Shevchenko captaincy in the club. However, Gazzayev informed the media that Milevskyi would remain the captain and Shevchenko would be the club leader.

=== Managerial changes ===
Team	Outgoing head coach	Manner of departure	Date of vacancy	Table	Incoming head coach	Date of appointment	Table
Dynamo Kyiv	(Russia) Yuri Syomin	own initiative	1 June 2009	Pre-season	(Russia) Valery Gazzayev	1 June 2009	Pre-season
Chornomorets	(Ukraine) Viktor Hryshko	own initiative	10 August	16th	(Ukraine) Ihor Nakonechny	12 August	16th
Chornomorets	(Ukraine) Ihor Nakonechny	temporary position	1 September	14th	(Ukraine) Andriy Bal	1 September	14th
Metalurh Zaporizhya	(Ukraine) Oleh Lutkov		3 September	12th	(Russia) Vladimir Khodus	3 September	12th
Zorya	(Ukraine) Yuriy Dudnyk	temporary position	23 September	12th	(Ukraine) Yuriy Koval	23 September	12th
Metalurh Zaporizhya	(Russia) Vladimir Khodus	temporary position	22 October	14th	(Ukraine) Roman Hryhorchuk	22 October	14th
Metalurh Zaporizhya	(Ukraine) Roman Hryhorchuk		7 November	9th	(Russia) Vladimir Khodus	8 November	9th
Metalurh Zaporizhya	(Russia) Vladimir Khodus	temporary position	8 December	12th	(Ukraine) Roman Hryhorchuk	8 December	12th
Obolon	(Ukraine) Yuriy Maksymov	own initiative	25 December	8th	(Ukraine) Serhiy Kovalets	14 January	8th
Zorya	(Ukraine) Yuriy Koval	sacked	29 December	12th	(Ukraine) Anatoly Chantsev	29 December	12th
Kryvbas	(Ukraine) Oleh Taran	Director in club	12 January	16th	(Ukraine) Yuriy Maksymov	12 January	16th
Arsenal	(Ukraine) Oleksandr Zavarov	Sacked	28 January	9th	(Ukraine) Vyacheslav Hrozny	28 January	9th
Arsenal	(Ukraine) Vyacheslav Hrozny	Resigned	16 April	8th	(Ukraine) Yuriy Bakalov	16 April	8th
Arsenal	(Ukraine) Yuriy Bakalov	caretaker	22 April	8th	(Ukraine) Vasyl Yevseyev	22 April	8th
Arsenal	(Ukraine) Vasyl Yevseyev	sick	30 April	8th	(Ukraine) Yuriy Bakalov	30 April	8th

== Stadiums ==
Rank	Stadium	Capacity	Highest Attendance		Club	Popular Opponent(s)
1	Donbas Arena	52,518	52,518	Round 29	Shakhtar Donetsk	Dynamo Kyiv
2	OSK Metalist	41,411	40,000	Round 16	Metalist Kharkiv	Obolon Kyiv
3	Dnipro Stadium	31,003	31,003	Round 11	Dnipro Dnipropetrovsk	Dynamo Kyiv
4	Metalurh Kryvbas	29,783	5,000	Round 3	Kryvbas Kryvyi Rih	Dynamo Kyiv
5	Ukraina Stadium	28,051	27,047	Round 25	Karpaty Lviv	Shakhtar Donetsk
6	RSK Olimpiyskiy	25,831	13,500	Round 4	Shakhtar Donetsk	Metalurh Donetsk
7	Vorskla Stadium	25,000	16,000	Round 3	Vorskla Poltava	Shakhtar Donetsk
8	Stadium Meteor	24,381	1,000	Round 13	Arsenal Kyiv	Vorskla Poltava
9	Avanhard Zorya	22,320	22,189	Round 21	Zorya Luhansk	Shakhtar Donetsk
9	Avanhard Zorya	22,320	12,300	Round 6	Shakhtar Donetsk	Zorya Luhansk
10	Lokomotiv Tavria	19,978	14,000	Round 8	Tavriya Simferopol	Metalist Kharkiv
11	Lobanovsky Dynamo	16,873	17,100	Round 22	Dynamo Kyiv	Metalist Kharkiv
11	Lobanovsky Dynamo	16,873	1,500	Round 21	Arsenal Kyiv	Zakarpattya Uzhhorod
12	Illichivets Stadium	12,680	8,500	Round 2	Illichivets Mariupol	Shakhtar Donetsk
13	Avanhard Zakarpattya	12,000	9,800	Round 13	Zakarpattya Uzhhorod	Dynamo Kyiv
14	Slavutych-Arena	11,983	12,000	Round 28	Metalurh Zaporizhya	Shakhtar Donetsk
15	Kolos Arsenal	5,654	5,600	Round 7 Round 9	Arsenal Kyiv	Shakhtar Donetsk; Dynamo Kyiv
16	Metalurh Donetsk	5,300	4,200	Round 21	Metalurh Donetsk	Dynamo Kyiv
17	Obolon Stadium	5,100	5,300	Round 21	Obolon Kyiv	Shakhtar Donetsk
18	Spartak Stadium	5,000	4,800	Round 12	Chornomorets Odesa	Shakhtar Donetsk
19	Bannikov Stadium	1,678	1,216	Round 29	Arsenal Kyiv	Metalurh Donetsk

== Qualification to European competitions for 2010–11 ==
- Since Ukraine finished in seventh place of the UEFA country ranking after the 2008–09 season, the league will gain one more qualification spot for 2010–11 UEFA Europa League. The Ukrainian Cup winner will now qualify for the play-off round.

=== Qualified teams ===
- After the 24th Round, both Dynamo Kyiv and Shakhtar Donetsk qualified for European football for the 2010–11 season.
- After the 26th Round, both Dynamo Kyiv and Shakhtar Donetsk qualified for 2010–11 UEFA Champions League.
- After the 27th Round, Metalist Kharkiv qualified for the 2010–11 UEFA Europa League.
- After the 28th Round, both Dnipro Dnipropetrovsk and Karpaty Lviv qualified for the 2010–11 UEFA Europa League.
- Shakhtar Donetsk captured the championship after a 1–0 win against rivals Dynamo Kyiv in the 29th Round, thus securing a place in the Champions League group stage. Dynamo Kyiv enters the Champions League third qualification round as runners up.
- Metalist Kharkiv's 4–1 away victory over Zorya Luhansk in the 29th Round secured them a third-place finish in the competition and a place in the Europa League play-off round. Also in the same round, Dnipro Dnipropetrovsk completed a 4–1 home victory against Illichivets which secured fourth-place and entry into Europa League third qualification round, since Karpaty Lviv lost 0–2 at home to Kryvbas Kryvyi Rih, leaving them in fifth place and qualification into the second qualification round.

Timeline of qualification

== League table ==
Pos	Team	Pld	W	D	L	GF	GA	GD	Pts	Qualification or relegation
1	Shakhtar Donetsk (C)	30	24	5	1	62	18	+44	77	Qualification to Champions League group stage
2	Dynamo Kyiv	30	22	5	3	61	16	+45	71	Qualification to Champions League third qualifying round
3	Metalist Kharkiv	30	19	5	6	49	23	+26	62	Qualification to Europa League play-off round
4	Dnipro Dnipropetrovsk	30	15	9	6	48	25	+23	54	Qualification to Europa League third qualifying round
5	Karpaty Lviv	30	13	11	6	44	35	+9	50	Qualification to Europa League second qualifying round
6	Tavriya Simferopol	30	12	9	9	38	38	0	45	Qualification to Europa League play-off round
7	Arsenal Kyiv	30	11	9	10	44	41	+3	42	
8	Metalurh Donetsk	30	11	7	12	41	33	+8	40	
9	Metalurh Zaporizhya	30	10	5	15	31	48	−17	35	
10	Vorskla Poltava	30	6	13	11	29	32	−3	31	
11	Obolon Kyiv	30	9	4	17	26	50	−24	31	
12	Illichivets Mariupol	30	7	8	15	31	56	−25	29	
13	Zorya Luhansk	30	7	7	16	23	47	−24	28	
14	Kryvbas Kryvyi Rih	30	7	4	19	31	47	−16	25	
15	Chornomorets Odesa (R)	30	5	9	16	21	44	−23	24	Relegation to Ukrainian First League
16	Zakarpattia Uzhhorod (R)	30	5	4	21	18	44	−26	19	Relegation to Ukrainian First League

Source: uafootball.net.ua
Rules for classification: 1st points; 2nd goal difference; 3rd goals scored; 4th fair play
(C) Champions; (R) Relegated

== Results ==
Home \ Away	ARK	CHO	DNI	DYN	ILL	KAR	KRY	MET	MDO	MZA	OBO	SHA	TAV	VOR	ZAK	ZOR
Arsenal Kyiv	—	2–0	1–1	0–1	3–1	0–0	2–1	1–2	2–0	2–0	4–1	2–4	1–6	2–0 (Note: Match took place in Dnipropetrovsk at the Meteor Stadium.)	0–0	1–1
Chornomorets Odesa	1–3	—	0–1	0–1	1–1	1–1	3–1	0–2	1–1	0–0	0–1	0–1	2–0	0–0	2–0	1–1
Dnipro	1–1	3–1	—	0–2	4–1	3–0	3–1	2–0	2–0	2–0	2–0	2–2	3–1	2–2	1–0	2–2
Dynamo Kyiv	3–1	5–0	2–1	—	3–1	1–1	1–0	3–0	3–1	3–0	2–1	3–0	6–0	1–0	2–0	2–0
Illichivets Mariupol	1–2	2–0	0–3	1–1	—	2–2	0–3	0–2	0–4	2–1	1–0	0–2	2–2	0–0	1–0	1–0
Karpaty Lviv	3–3	1–1	1–0	1–0	2–2	—	0–2	2–1	2–2	3–3	5–0	0–2	1–0	1–0	1–0	4–0
Kryvbas Kryvyi Rih	0–1	2–3	0–0	1–3	0–2	1–2	—	2–2	0–1	1–3	3–2	0–2	0–1	1–1	3–1	4–0
Metalist Kharkiv	1–0	5–1	3–2	1–2	3–1	1–0	1–0	—	2–0	4–0	0–1	1–1	1–1	1–0	2–1	2–0
Metalurh Donetsk	3–0	2–0	0–0	1–1	4–1	1–0	0–1	0–1	—	3–0	5–0	0–1	0–0	1–3	4–1	0–0
Metalurh Zaporizhya	2–1	1–0	1–3	0–0	2–0	0–1	2–1	0–2	3–2	—	2–1	0–2	0–1	1–1	3–0	3–1
Obolon Kyiv	0–0	1–0	1–0	0–4	1–1	1–3	1–2	0–2	2–1	4–1 (Note: Original game ended in a 4–1 victory to Obolon. A technical 3–0 victory was awarded to Metalurh Zaporizhya as a result of four players from Obolon Kyiv using a banned substance administered to them during the game. FC Obolon Kyiv protested the decision and entered arbitration via the Appellate Committee of the Ukrainian Football Federation. The decision was overturned 20 November 2009.)	—	0–1	1–0	1–1	0–1	3–0
Shakhtar Donetsk	3–1	3–0	0–0	1–0	2–1	5–1	3–0	2–1	4–1	2–0	4–0	—	3–0	1–0	1–0	3–1
Tavriya Simferopol	2–2	2–1	2–1	2–3	3–3	1–1	3–1	0–0	1–0	2–0	0–0	2–3	—	1–0	3–2	0–1
Vorskla Poltava	1–5	0–0	1–1	1–1	3–0	1–2	0–0	0–0	1–2	1–1	3–2	1–1	0–1	—	2–0	2–0
Zakarpattia Uzhhorod	2–1	1–1	0–2	1–0	0–1	1–1	3–0	0–2	0–1	0–1	0–1	1–1	0–1	1–3	—	2–1
Zorya Luhansk	0–0	0–1	0–1	0–2	3–2	0–2	1–0	1–4	1–1	3–1	2–0	0–2	0–0	2–1	2–0	—

Source: uafootball.net.ua
Legend: Blue = home team win; Yellow = draw; Red = away team win.

== Round by round ==
The following table is a historic representation of the team's position in the standings after the completion of each round.

Team ╲ Round	1	2	3	4	5	6	7	8	9	10	11	12	13	14	15	16	17	18	19	20	21	22	23	24	25	26	27	28	29	30
Shakhtar Donetsk	2	2	3	2	2	2	2	2	2	2	2	2	3	3	2	2	2	2	2	2	1	1	1	2	2	2	1	1	1	1
Dynamo Kyiv	1	1	1	1	1	1	1	1	1	1	1	1	1	1	1	1	1	1	1	1	2	2	2	1	1	1	2	2	2	2
Metalist Kharkiv	3	8	5	3	5	4	5	5	4	4	3	3	2	2	3	3	3	3	3	3	3	3	3	3	3	3	3	3	3	3
Dnipro	7	4	4	6	9	6	3	3	3	3	5	5	5	4	4	4	4	5	4	4	4	4	4	4	4	4	4	4	4	4
Karpaty Lviv	5	5	10	7	7	5	7	7	6	7	7	7	7	7	7	7	7	6	6	5	5	5	5	5	5	5	5	5	5	5
Tavriya Simferopol	3	11	7	4	3	3	4	4	5	6	6	6	6	6	5	5	6	7	7	7	6	6	6	6	6	6	6	6	6	6
Arsenal Kyiv	7	3	2	5	4	8	8	9	10	10	10	8	8	9	10	10	9	9	9	9	9	9	8	8	8	8	8	7	7	7
Metalurh Donetsk	7	12	8	11	8	10	9	8	7	5	4	4	4	5	6	6	5	4	5	6	7	7	7	7	7	7	7	8	8	8
Metalurh Zaporizhya	13	9	12	12	12	12	14	12	13	14	14	9	10	10	12	12	12	11	11	10	10	10	10	9	9	11	9	9	9	9
Vorskla Poltava	11	6	9	10	11	11	11	11	11	11	12	11	9	8	11	11	10	10	10	11	11	12	11	11	11	10	11	11	11	10
Obolon Kyiv	13	7	11	8	6	9	10	10	9	9	8	12	12	12	9	8	8	8	8	8	8	8	9	10	10	9	10	10	10	11
Illichivets Mariupol	6	10	6	9	10	7	6	6	8	8	9	10	11	11	8	9	11	12	12	12	12	11	12	12	14	12	13	12	12	12
Zorya Luhansk	7	13	13	13	13	13	12	13	12	13	11	13	13	14	14	14	13	13	13	14	14	15	15	14	12	14	12	13	13	13
Kryvbas Kryvyi Rih	15	15	14	14	15	16	16	16	16	16	16	15	15	16	16	16	16	16	16	16	16	16	16	16	16	16	16	15	15	14
Chornomorets Odesa	16	16	16	16	14	14	15	15	15	12	13	14	14	13	13	13	14	14	14	13	13	13	13	13	13	13	14	14	14	15
Zakarpattia Uzhhorod	12	14	14	15	16	15	13	14	14	15	15	16	16	15	15	15	15	15	15	15	15	14	14	15	15	15	15	16	16	16

Source: Dynamo Kyiv's Official Site (in Ukrainian)

=== Rescheduled games ===
- Due to the participation of Shakhtar Donetsk in the 2009 UEFA Super Cup on 28 August 2009, their Round 5 match against Metalist Kharkiv was rescheduled to 23 September 2009 (after Round 7). Upon completion of this game Metalist moved from 6th to 5th in the standings.
- All Round 13 matches were cancelled due to a strike by the referees, delegates and inspectors from the Football Federation of Ukraine. Games were to be played 7 November and 8. The first match was played on 9 December 2009 initiating Round 16. The rest of the matches are scheduled after the winter break to be played 24 March 2010, and 7 April 2010. For historical tabulation purpose the Round-by-Round displays chronologically when the round was played and not the name used by the FPL.

== Top goalscorers ==
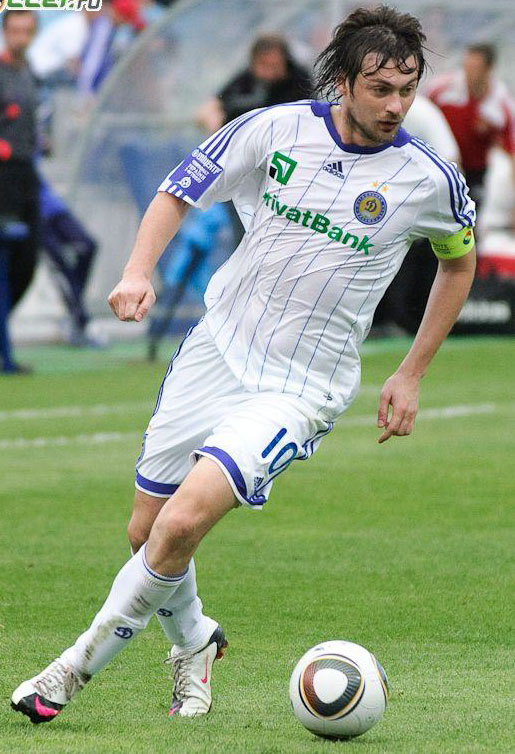
Milevskyi in 2010

Last updated: 9 May 2010

#	Scorer	Goals (Pen.)	Team
1	(Ukraine) Artem Milevskyi	17 (5)	Dynamo Kyiv
2	(Brazil) Jajá	16 (3)	Metalist Kharkiv
3	(Ukraine) Yevhen Seleznyov	13 (2)	Shakhtar/Dnipro
4	(Brazil) Luiz Adriano	11 (2)	Shakhtar Donetsk
5	(Belarus) Andrey Varankow	10	Obolon Kyiv/Kryvbas
6	(Armenia) Henrikh Mkhitaryan	9	Metalurh Donetsk
6	(Ukraine) Denys Oliynyk	9	Metalist Kharkiv
6	(Ukraine) Andriy Vorobey	9	Arsenal Kyiv
6	(Romania) Ionuț Mazilu	9 (1)	Arsenal Kyiv
6	(Brazil) Jádson	9 (3)	Shakhtar Donetsk

== Season awards ==
By the competition's statute, the following awards was presented. The award presentation took place on 15 June 2010 at InterContinental in Kyiv.

The laureates of the 2009–10 UPL season were:

- Best player: (Croatia) Darijo Srna (Shakhtar Donetsk)
- Best coach: (Romania) Mircea Lucescu (Shakhtar Donetsk)
- Best goalkeeper: (Ukraine) Andriy Pyatov (Shakhtar Donetsk)
- Best arbiter: (Ukraine) Viktor Shvetsov (Odesa)
- Best goalscorer: (Ukraine) Artem Milevskyi (Dynamo Kyiv)
- Fair play prize: (Ukraine) Metalurh Donetsk

Pride of flag is a club award given to the club who provided the most players for the national team and youth teams: U-21, U-19, U-17. In 2009, the award was given to Dynamo Kyiv, while the first runner-up was Shakhtar Donetsk and second – Dnipro Dnipropetrovsk. No data is available for the 2010 season.

== See also ==
- 2009–10 Ukrainian Second League
- 2009–10 Ukrainian Premier League Reserves
- 2009–10 Ukrainian First League
- 2009–10 Ukrainian Cup
- 2009–10 UEFA Europa League
