= 1952 Cup of the Ukrainian SSR =

The 1952 Ukrainian Cup was a football knockout competition conducting by the Football Federation of the Ukrainian SSR and was known as the Ukrainian Cup.

== Teams ==
=== Non-participating teams ===
The Ukrainian teams of masters did not take part in the competition.

- 1952 Soviet Class A (2): FC Dynamo Kyiv, FC Shakhtar Stalino
- 1952 Soviet Class B (2): FC Lokomotyv Kharkiv, DO Kyiv

== Competition schedule ==
=== First elimination round ===
Shakhtar Druzhkivka	3:1	(Rep) Dynamo Dnipropetrovsk
Metalurh Zaporizhia (Rep)	7:0	Chuhuyiv team
Torpedo Kharkiv (Rep)	+/-	(Rep) Metalurh Zhdanov	(no show)
Mashynobudivnyk Dnipropetrovsk (Rep)	2:1	(Rep) Dzerzhynets Voroshylovhrad
Mashynobudivnyk Kyiv (Rep)	+/-	(Rep) Spartak Bila Tserkva
Mashynobudivnyk Sumy (Rep)	+/-	Enerhiya Poltava	(no show)
Dynamo Zhytomyr (Rep)	3:1	Lokomotyv Chernihiv
Vinnytsia team	1:3	(Rep) Bilshovyk Kyiv
ODO Lvov (Rep)	6:0	(Rep) Spartak Ivano-Frankivsk
Volodymyr-Volynskyi team	1:0	Iskra Sambor
Zolochiv team	2:3	(Rep) Dynamo Ternopil
Dynamo Chernivtsi (Rep)	2:1	(Rep) Kolkhospnyk Berehovo
Spartak Kherson (Rep)	0:1	(Rep) Chervonyi Stiah Mykolaiv
Traktor Kirovohrad (Rep)	?:?	Odessa team
ODO Odessa (Rep)	?:?	Izmail team
Dynamo Proskuriv (Rep)	3:0	Rivne team	1:1 (replay)

=== Second elimination round ===
Shakhtar Druzhkivka	0:7	(Rep) Metalurh Zaporizhia
Torpedo Kharkiv (Rep)	5:0	(Rep) Mashynobudivnyk Dnipropetrovsk
FC Mashynobudivnyk Kyiv (Rep)	+/-	(Rep) Mashynobudivnyk Sumy	(no show)
Dynamo Zhytomyr (Rep)	1:2	(Rep) Bilshovyk Kyiv
ODO Lvov (Rep)	20:0	Volodymyr-Volynskyi team
Dynamo Ternopil (Rep)	0:4	(Rep) Dynamo Chernivtsi
Chervonyi Stiah Mykolaiv (Rep)	3:1	(Rep) Traktor Kirovohrad
ODO Odessa (Rep)	4:1	(Rep) Dynamo Proskurov

=== Quarterfinals ===
Metalurh Zaporizhia (Rep)	9:0	(Rep) Torpedo Kharkiv
Mashynobudivnyk Kyiv (Rep)	3:1	(Rep) Bilshovyk Kyiv
ODO Lvov (Rep)	1:0	(Rep) Dynamo Chernivtsi
Chervonyi Stiah Mykolaiv (Rep)	4:1	(Rep) ODO Odessa

=== Semifinals ===
Metalurh Zaporizhia (Rep)	1:0	(Rep) Mashynobudivnyk Kyiv
ODO Lvov (Rep)	5:1	(Rep) Chervonyi Stiah Mykolaiv

=== Final ===
The final was held in Zaporizhia.

3 August 1952

Metalurh Zaporizhia (Rep)	6–3	(Rep) ODO Lvov

Zaporizhia

== Top goalscorers ==
Scorer	Goals	Team
(Ukrainian Soviet Socialist Republic)	?	

Ukrainian Cup 1952 Winners

FC Mashynobudivnyk Kyiv
Second title

== See also ==
- Soviet Cup
- Ukrainian Cup
