= Rudawski =

Rudawski (Polish: [ruˈdaf.ski]; feminine: Rudawska, plural: Rudawscy) in Polish, and Rudavskyi (Ukrainian: Рудавський; feminine: Рудавська, Rudavska) in Ukrainian, is a Slavic surname present in Poland and Ukraine.

Notable people with the surname include:

- Adam Rudawski (born 1966), a Polish politician, economist, and academic professor
- Mykhaylo Rudavskyi (born 2001), a Ukrainian footballer
- Oren Rudavsky (born c. 1957), an American documentary filmmaker
