= Artem Milevskyi =

Ukrainian footballer (born 1985)

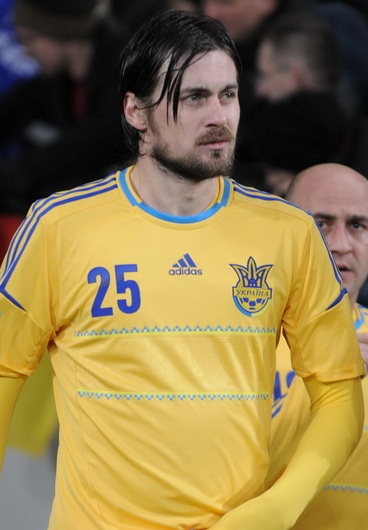
- Milevskyi in 2011

Personal information
- Full name: Artem Volodymyrovych Milevskyi
- Date of birth: 12 January 1985 (age 41)
- Place of birth: Minsk, Soviet Union (now Belarus)
- Height: 1.90 m (6 ft 3 in)
- Position: Second striker

Youth career
- 1998–2000: Smena Minsk
- 2000–2001: Obukhiv

Senior career*
Years	Team	Apps	(Gls)
2001–2002	Borysfen-2 Boryspil	9	(3)
2002–2013	Dynamo Kyiv	178	(57)
2002–2004	→ Dynamo-2 Kyiv	54	(18)
2002	→ Dynamo-3 Kyiv	1	(0)
2013–2014	Gaziantepspor	6	(1)
2014–2015	Hajduk Split	21	(3)
2015	RNK Split	1	(0)
2016	Concordia Chiajna	13	(5)
2016–2017	Tosno	17	(0)
2017–2018	Dynamo Brest	29	(8)
2018	Kisvárda	8	(0)
2019–2020	Dynamo Brest	53	(10)
2021	Mynai	10	(0)
Total		400	(105)

International career^{‡}
2001	Belarus U16	1	(0)
2001–2002	Ukraine U17	5	(5)
2003–2006	Ukraine U21	31	(7)
2006–2012	Ukraine	50	(8)
Medal record
Men's football
Representing Ukraine
UEFA European Under-19 Championship
Bronze medal – third place	2004 Switzerland
UEFA European Under-21 Championship
Runner-up	2006 Portugal
- * Club domestic league appearances and goals as of 12 May 2021 ‡ National team caps and goals as of 24 December 2020

Artem Volodymyrovych Milevskyi (also transliterated Milevskyy, Ukrainian: Артем Володимирович Мілевський; Belarusian: Арцём Уладзіміравіч Мілеўскі, Łacinka: Arciom Uladzimiravič Mileŭski; born 12 January 1985) is a Ukrainian former professional footballer who played as a second striker.

Milevskyi is known both for his technical ability and physicality which allows him to play with a quicker forward. He holds a degree of Master of Sports of Ukraine, International Class (2005).

He was also a Ukrainian international, earning 50 caps and representing his country at 2006 FIFA World Cup and UEFA Euro 2012.

Milevskyi is a brother of Belarusian female tennis player Ksenia Milevskaya.

== Club career ==
=== Early career and Dynamo Kyiv ===
Milevskyi played at youth level for Belarusian club Smena Minsk. In 2000, he moved to Ukrainian side Boryfsfen Boryspil before joining Dynamo Kyiv in 2002. He made his debut for Dynamo as a late substitute in a UEFA Champions League match against Internazionale on 10 December 2003, aged just 18. It was his only appearance of the 2003–04 season. The next season, he also only made one appearance, this time in the Ukrainian Premier League against Chornomorets Odesa. In the 2005–06 season, Milevskyi began to show his talent for Dynamo, scoring 4 goals in 13 appearances.

In 2006, Milevskyi was voted best footballer in Ukraine for the month of August, in a traditional survey by football journalists, head coaches and captains conducted by sports newspaper Komanda. He scored 8 goals in 21 appearances as Dynamo went unbeaten domestically during the 2006–07 season.

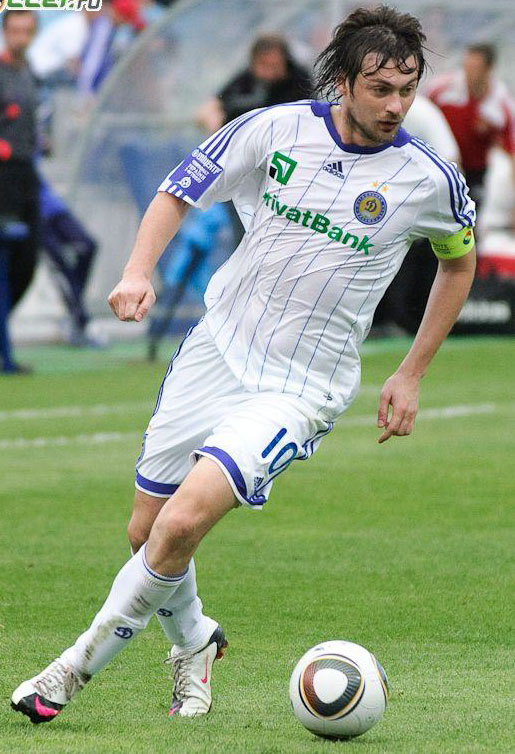
Milevskyi in action.

On 6 September 2007, in the club's 80th anniversary, Milevskyi scored a header in a 2–2 friendly draw with Milan. However, he spent the majority of the 2007–08 season injured, making just 11 appearances (and scoring 5 goals) as Dynamo finished as runners-up to champions Shakhtar Donetsk.

On 6 August 2008, Milevskyi scored a crucial penalty against Drogheda United in the second leg of the Champions League second qualifying round to put Dynamo 2–1 up, in a final 2–2 home draw (4–3 win on aggregate). One week later, he scored twice and assisted to help Dynamo come back from 1–0 down against Spartak Moscow in the competition's third qualifying round, in a 4–1 away triumph. In the return leg, he scored another brace in another 4–1 victory. He finished the 2008–09 season with a career high 18 goals in 41 appearances. The next season, he beat his career high tally for goals, scoring 19 in 37 appearances in all competitions.

On 31 October 2010, Dynamo defeated Mariupol Illichivets 9–0, with Milevskyi scoring his first hat-trick and finishing the match with four goals. He went on to score 13 more goals that season as Dynamo reached the semi-finals of the 2010–11 UEFA Europa League, losing to Braga.

Milevskyi's Dynamo career took a turn for the worse in the 2011–12 season as goals and form began to dry up and his playing time took a big hit. He still managed 9 goals and 13 assist in 29 appearances, but cracks began to show in both his attitude and fitness. The next season was poorer for Milevskyi as he made just 15 appearances and scored 0 goals. He was released by Dynamo at the end of the 2012–13 season.

=== Gaziantepspor ===
Milevskyi signed a three-year contract with Gaziantepspor during the summer of 2013. While contracted to Gaziantepspor, Milevskyi crashed his Ferrari California, and went on to have his contract cancelled by mutual consent on 31 December 2013. He played less than 400 minutes of football that season for Gaziantepspor, scoring one goal and creating one assist.

After his release from Gaziantepspor, Milevskyi joined Kazakh club FC Aktobe in February 2014, however after only one week, there were reports his contract had been terminated. Artem recently described this as one of the toughest points of his career.

=== Hajduk Split ===
On 29 July 2014, Milevskyi signed for Croatian club Hajduk Split on a two-year deal. He made his debut for Hajduk in a 6–0 win against Zadar. He scored his first goal for Hajduk in a 2–2 draw with Lokomotiva; he was introduced late in the match alongside Elvir Maloku. In the final six minutes of the match, with Hajduk losing 2–0, Artem assisted his fellow substitute Maloku to make it 2–1, and then scored himself in the final minute to salvage a point for his side.

On 3 September 2015, he was released from Hajduk after his contract was terminated by mutual consent.

=== RNK Split ===
After his Hajduk contract was terminated, Milevskyi signed for Hajduk's city rivals RNK Split, however on 4 November 2015, he was released from the club.

=== Tosno ===
On 4 July 2017, Milevskyi left FC Tosno by mutual consent.

=== Dynamo Brest ===
Milevskyi joined Dynamo Brest for a second time in January 2019, on a contract until the end of 2020.

=== Mynai ===
On 24 December 2020 Milevskyi signed a contract for 1.5 years with Mynai, and thus returned to playing in the Ukrainian Premier League.

On 23 September 2021 Milevskyi publicly announced the end of his professional career.

== International career ==
Milevskyi began playing internationally for Belarus, being a part of the nation's unsuccessful qualifying campaign for the 2000 UEFA European Under-16 Championship, before taking Ukrainian nationality. Because he played for the Belarus under-16 team, there was a big international issue in 2003 him joining the Ukrainian side. After some dialogues between Belarusian and Ukrainian federations, an agreement was finally reached. He was part of the Ukraine under-19 team which finished as semi-finalists at the 2004 UEFA European Under-19 Championship. In next year's FIFA World Youth Championship, Milevskyi and Ukraine were ousted in the round of 16.

Milevskyi then joined Ukraine's under-21 squad for the 2006 UEFA European Under-21 Championship, where Ukraine finished in second place to Netherlands; Milevskyi was picked by UEFA.com journalists as a member of the "Team of the Tournament", pitching as striker alongside the Netherlands' Klaas-Jan Huntelaar. During the tournament's group stage, also against the Netherlands, Milevskyi became known for his cheeky Panenka-style penalty taking in a 2–1 win.

Later in the year, Milevskyi was selected for the nation's squad for the 2006 FIFA World Cup. He would earn his first full cap for the Ukraine senior team on 19 June 2006 in a group stage match against Saudi Arabia, coming on as a late substitute for striker Andriy Shevchenko in a 4–0 win.

In the round of 16 match against Switzerland, Milevskyi was one of the three Ukrainian penalty takers who scored in the shootout which followed a 0–0 draw after extra time (while repeating the Panenka trick, which backfired domestically on 26 October 2008, in a league match against Tavriya Simferopol). Ukraine won the shootout 3–0, but ended their 2006 World Cup campaign with a 3–0 loss to eventual champions Italy in the quarter-finals.

Milevskyi scored his first goal for the senior side on 6 February 2008 in a 1–1 friendly draw with Cyprus. His second Ukraine goal was a penalty kick against Slovakia in a friendly match in Cyprus on 10 February 2009.

On 26 May 2012, he was called up by manager Oleh Blokhin in the provisional list of 26 players for UEFA Euro 2012 and three days later for the final list. He made three appearances during the tournament as Ukraine was eliminated in group stage.

He has not played for the national team since October 2012, with his last appearance coming against Moldova.

== Career statistics ==
=== Club ===
As of 12 January 2020

Club	Season	League			Cup		Europe		Super Cup		Total	
Club	Season	Division	Apps	Goals	Apps	Goals	Apps	Goals	Apps	Goals	Apps	Goals
Borysfen-2 Boryspil	2001–02	Second League	9	3	–		–		–		9	3
Dynamo Kyiv	2002–03	Ukrainian Premier League	6	1	4	1	–		–		10	2
Dynamo Kyiv	2003–04	Ukrainian Premier League	8	1	3	1	1	0	–		12	2
Dynamo Kyiv	2004–05	Ukrainian Premier League	8	0	3	1	–		–		11	1
Dynamo Kyiv	2005–06	Ukrainian Premier League	16	3	6	3	–		–		22	6
Dynamo Kyiv	2006–07	Ukrainian Premier League	14	5	4	1	6	1	1	1	25	8
Dynamo Kyiv	2007–08	Ukrainian Premier League	21	5	7	0	4	0	–		32	5
Dynamo Kyiv	2008–09	Ukrainian Premier League	24	10	2	0	15	7	1	1	42	18
Dynamo Kyiv	2009–10	Ukrainian Premier League	27	17	3	1	6	1	1	0	37	19
Dynamo Kyiv	2010–11	Ukrainian Premier League	26	9	3	2	14	6	–		43	17
Dynamo Kyiv	2011–12	Ukrainian Premier League	18	6	2	1	8	1	1	1	29	9
Dynamo Kyiv	2012–13	Ukrainian Premier League	10	0	1	0	4	0	–		15	0
Dynamo Kyiv	Total		178	57	44	11	52	16	4	3	278	87
Gaziantepspor	2013–14	Süper Lig	6	1	3	0	–		–		9	1
Hajduk Split	2014–15	Croatian First Football League	21	3	5	0	1	0	–		27	3
RNK Split	2015–16	Croatian First Football League	1	0	–		–		–		1	0
Concordia Chiajna	2015–16	Liga I	13	5	2	1	–		–		15	6
Tosno	2016–17	Russian National Football League	17	0	1	0	–		–		18	0
Dinamo Brest	2017	Belarusian Premier League	15	5	1	0	2	0	0	0	18	5
Dinamo Brest	2018	Belarusian Premier League	14	3	5	2	0	0	1	0	20	5
Dinamo Brest	Total		29	8	6	2	2	0	1	0	38	10
Kisvárda	2018–19	Nemzeti Bajnokság I	8	0	2	0	0	0	0	0	10	0
Dinamo Brest	2019	Belarusian Premier League	26	4	2	0	–		1	0	29	4
Dinamo Brest	Dinamo Brest total		55	12	8	2	2	0	2	0	67	14
Career total			310	81	65	14	55	16	6	3	434	114

=== International ===
Appearances and goals by national team and year
National team	Year	Apps	Goals
Ukraine	2006	6	0
Ukraine	2007	5	0
Ukraine	2008	5	1
Ukraine	2009	11	3
Ukraine	2010	6	1
Ukraine	2011	9	2
Ukraine	2012	8	1
Total		50	8

=== International goals ===
Ukraine score listed first, score column indicates score after each Milevskyi goal.

International goals by date, venue, cap, opponent, score, result and competition
No.	Date	Venue	Cap	Opponent	Score	Result	Competition
1	6 February 2008	GSP Stadium, Nicosia, Cyprus	12	Cyprus	1–1	1–1	Friendly
2	10 February 2009	Tsirion Stadium, Limassol, Cyprus	17	Slovakia	3–2	3–2	Friendly
3	5 September 2009	Lobanovsky Dynamo Stadium, Kyiv, Ukraine	22	Andorra	2–0	5–0	2010 FIFA World Cup qualification
4	5 September 2009	Lobanovsky Dynamo Stadium, Kyiv, Ukraine	22	Andorra	4–0	5–0	2010 FIFA World Cup qualification
5	8 October 2010	Lobanovsky Dynamo Stadium, Kyiv, Ukraine	31	Canada	1–2	2–2	Friendly
6	8 February 2011	Municipal Stadium, Paralimni, Cyprus	34	Romania	2–0	2–2	Friendly
7	15 November 2011	Arena Lviv, Lviv, Ukraine	42	Romania	1–0	2–1	Friendly
8	28 May 2012	Kufstein Arena, Kufstein, Austria	44	Estonia	4–0	4–0	Friendly

== Honours ==
=== Club ===
Dynamo Kyiv

- Ukrainian Premier League (4): 2002–03, 2003–04, 2006–07, 2008–09
- Ukrainian Cup (4): 2002–03, 2004–05, 2005–06, 2006–07
- Ukrainian Super Cup (3): 2006, 2009, 2011

Dinamo Brest

- Belarusian Premier League (1): 2019
- Belarusian Cup (1): 2017–18
- Belarusian Super Cup (2): 2018, 2019

=== International ===
Ukraine U-21

- UEFA European Under-21 Championship: runner-up 2006

=== Individual ===
- Top assister of the Ukraine Premier League: 2008–09
- Top scorer of the Ukraine Premier League: 2009–10
- Ukrainian Footballer of the Year: 2008, 2009
- Ukrainian Premier League Footballer of the Year: 2009

== See also ==
- 2005 FIFA World Youth Championship squads#Ukraine
