= Ihor Nakonechnyi =

Ukrainian footballer and coach

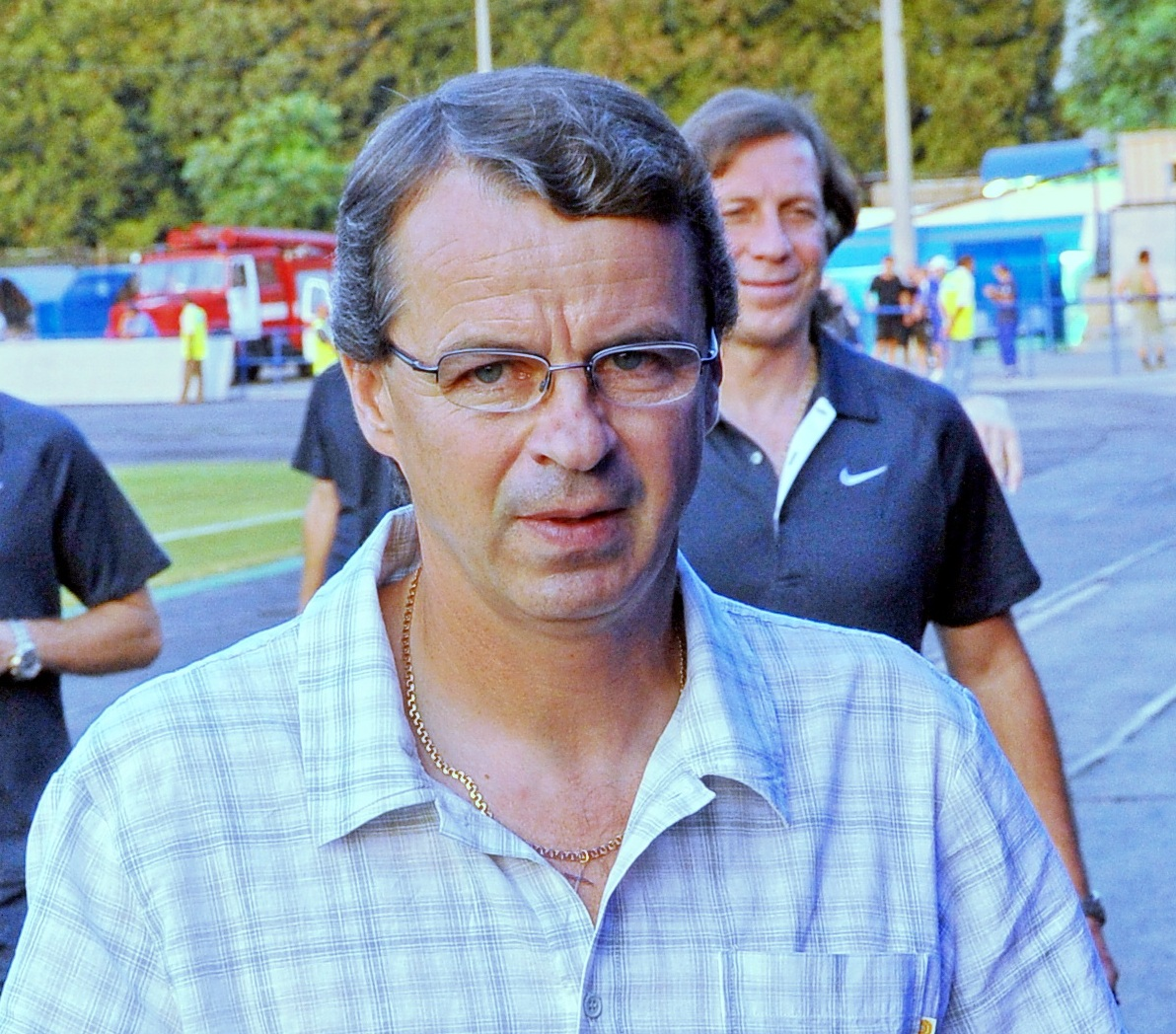
- Nakonechnyi in 2010

Personal information
- Full name: Ihor Anatoliyovych Nakonechnyi
- Date of birth: 23 February 1960 (age 66)
- Place of birth: Kyiv, Ukrainian SSR
- Height: 1.80 m (5 ft 11 in)
- Position: Midfielder

Senior career*
Years	Team	Apps	(Gls)
1978–1982	SKA Kyiv	77	(9)
1983–1989	Chornomorets Odesa	156	(7)
1989–1991	Metalurh Zaporizhzhia	109	(11)
1992–1993	SC Odesa	25	(3)
1993	Íþróttabandalag Vestmannaeyja	5	(0)
1993	Blaho Blahoyeve	4	(0)
1995–1995	Metalurh Zaporizhzhia	39	(1)
1995	Viktor Zaporizhzhia	5	(0)
1995–1996	Rybak Odesa		
1996–1997	SKA-Lotto Odesa	22	(0)

Managerial career
- 1992–1993: SC Odesa (assistant)
- 1997–1998: SKA-Lotto Odesa (assistant)
- 1998–1999: Chornomorets Odesa (assistant)
- 1999: SC Odesa
- 1999–2000: Chornomorets Odesa (assistant)
- 2001: Chornomorets-2 Odesa
- 2002–2003: FC Tiraspol
- 2003–2004: Sheriff Tiraspol
- 2004–2005: Chornomorets Odesa (assistant)
- 2005–2007: MKT-Araz
- 2008–2009: Chornomorets Odesa (assistant)
- 2009–2010: Chornomorets Odesa
- * Club domestic league appearances and goals

Ihor Anatoliyovych Nakonechnyi (Ukrainian: Ігор Анатолійович Наконечний; born 23 February 1960) is a retired Ukrainian football player and coach. He played with different Soviet and Ukrainian clubs.
