= Martin Pedersen (footballer) =

Danish footballer (born 1983)

Personal information
- Full name: Martin Meldgaard Pedersen
- Date of birth: 9 October 1983 (age 43)
- Place of birth: Aalborg. Denmark
- Height: 1.74 m (5 ft 8 1/2 in)
- Position: Left-back

Senior career*
Years	Team	Apps	(Gls)
2002–2009	AaB	99	(2)
2005–2006	→ SønderjyskE (loan)	25	(0)
2009–2011	Vejle	18	(0)
2010	→ Valur (loan)	19	(2)
2011	Hjørring	9	(0)
2011–2013	Fredericia	12	(0)
2013	B36 Tórshavn	14	(0)
2013–2016	Jammerbugt		
2017	Vejgaard		
2018–2019	Jetsmark		

International career
1999	Denmark U16	1	(0)
2002–2004	Denmark U20	6	(0)
2002–2006	Denmark U21	28	(0)

Managerial career
- 2016: Jammerbugt FC
- * Club domestic league appearances and goals

Martin Meldgaard Pedersen (born 9 October 1983) is a Danish former professional footballer who played as a left-back. He has played 28 games for the Danish under-21 national team, and was selected for the 2006 European Under-21 Championship.

== Club career ==
Pedersen made his senior debut for Aalborg BK (AaB) in the 2002–03 Superliga season. At age 21, he had played 39 Superliga matches for AaB. Struggling to capture a first team spot in competition with Danish international defender Allan K. Jepsen, Pedersen was put on loan with Superliga relegation battlers SønderjyskE for the 2005–06 Superliga season. He played 25 games for SønderjyskE, but could not prevent them from being relegated at the end of the season.

Back at AaB, Pedersen was initially competing with Danish under-21 national team defender Michael Jakobsen for the left back. With Jakobsen eventually settling in the central defense, Pedersen played a number of games at left back, as AaB won bronze medals in the 2006–07 Superliga season. Following Aalborg BK's bronze medals they qualified for the UEFA Cup, where a dream came true for Martin Pedersen as he played against his favourite foreign team, Tottenham Hotspur at White Hart Lane.

Pedersen had his best AaB season the following year, when he played 28 of 33 games as the team won the 2007–08 Superliga championship. After the championship, AaB qualified for the 2008–09 Champions League group stage, where Pedersen had a lot of stable performances against Celtic F.C., Villarreal CF and Manchester United. Sir Alex Ferguson even mentioned Pedersen of one of the Aalborg BK profiles in an interview, a few days before AaB entered the Old Trafford to play against Manchester United.

AaB however, did not want to extend his contract, which resulted in a transfer to Superliga relegation battlers Vejle Boldklub in January 2009, six months before his contract ended. Injuries ruined his first time at the club, and he only played five games as Vejle were relegated at the end of the season. In his second season with Vejle, Pedersen fell out with the club. He was loaned out to Icelandic team Valur in March 2010.

After returning to Denmark he settled his contract with Vejle Boldklub and joined FC Hjørring in the same division until the end of 2010/2011 season. In summer of 2011 Pedersen signed a 1,5 years contract for promotion hopeful FC Fredericia and after a great start he tore his cruciate ligament against Randers FC in September 2011. The operation went well and Pedersen returned to full training in April 2012.

He finished his active career at Vejgaard BK.

== International career ==
He has earned 35 caps for various Danish youth team selections, starting with the Under-16s in 1999. He made his debut for the Danish under-21 national team in August 2002, 18 years old. He played a total 28 games for the Under-21s, and was selected for the 2006 European Under-21 Championship in May 2006.
