= Mykhaylo Rudavskyi =

Ukrainian footballer

Personal information
- Full name: Mykhaylo Serhiyovych Rudavskyi
- Date of birth: 26 May 2001 (age 25)
- Place of birth: Kharkiv, Ukraine
- Height: 1.72 m (5 ft 8 in)
- Position: Left-back

Team information
- Current team: Metalurh Zaporizhzhia
- Number: 28

Youth career
- 2013–2014: KhTZ-2 Kharkiv
- 2014 2015: UFK-Metal Kharkiv
- 2015–2016: Metalist Kharkiv
- 2016–2018: Shakhtar Donetsk

Senior career*
Years	Team	Apps	(Gls)
2018–2021	Shakhtar Donetsk	0	(0)
2021–2022	Vovchansk	10	(0)
2022–2023	Metalist 1925 Kharkiv	11	(0)
2024	Dinaz Vyshhorod	7	(0)
2024–2025	Bukovyna Chernivtsi	4	(0)
2025–	Metalurh Zaporizhzhia	24	(0)

International career^{‡}
2019	Ukraine U18	1	(0)
- * Club domestic league appearances and goals as of 4 June 2026 ‡ National team caps and goals as of 23 August 2022

Mykhaylo Serhiyovych Rudavskyi (Ukrainian: Михайло Сергійович Рудавський; born 26 May 2001) is a Ukrainian professional footballer who plays as a left-back for Metalurh Zaporizhzhia.

== Career ==
=== Early years ===
Born in Kharkiv, Rudavskyi began his career in the local KhTZ and Metalist Kharkiv and then continued in the Shakhtar Donetsk academy. His first coaches were Serhiy Sokhan and Roman Melnyk. He played in the Ukrainian Premier League Reserves and never made his debut for the senior Shakhtar Donetsk squad.

=== Vovchansk ===
In July 2021 Rudavskyi signed a year contract with the Ukrainian Second League side Vovchansk and made the debut as a starting player in a losing home match against Trostianets on 31 July 2021.

=== Metalist 1925 Kharkiv ===
In August 2022 he signed a 3-year deal with the Ukrainian Premier League side Metalist 1925 Kharkiv and made his debut in the Ukrainian Premier League in an away match against Shakhtar Donetsk on 23 August 2022.
