= Anatoliy Chantsev =

Ukrainian football manager

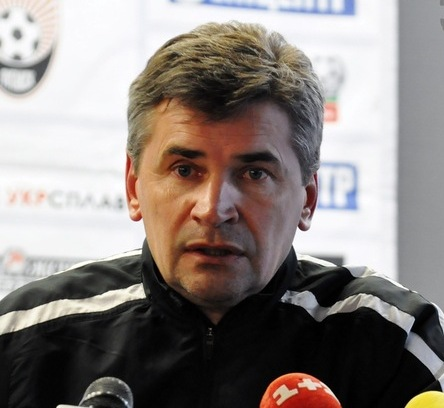

Personal information
- Full name: Anatoliy Dmytrovych Chantsev
- Date of birth: 20 February 1958 (age 68)
- Place of birth: Zaporizhzhia, Ukrainian SSR, Soviet Union
- Height: 1.81 m (5 ft 11 in)
- Position: Defender

Team information
- Current team: Motor Zaporizhzhia (manager)

Senior career*
Years	Team	Apps	(Gls)
1980–1983	Metalurh Zaporizhzhia	27	(1)
1983–1985	Avanhard Rivne	48	(0)
1986–1988	Torpedo Zaporizhzhia	73	(1)
1988–1991	Gomselmash Gomel	72	(0)

Managerial career
- 1991–1992: Vedrich Rechitsa (assistant)
- 1992–1993: Vedrich Rechitsa
- 1993: Vedrich Rechitsa
- 1996: Vedrich Rechitsa
- 1997–1998: ZLiN Gomel
- 2001–2002: Gomel (assistant)
- 2002–2007: Metalurh Zaporizhzhia (assistant)
- 2005: Metalurh Zaporizhzhia
- 2007–2008: Metalurh Zaporizhzhia
- 2009–2011: Zorya Luhansk
- 2013: Helios Kharkiv
- 2013–2015: Metalurh Zaporizhzhia (assistant)
- 2015: Metalurh Zaporizhzhia
- 2016: Karpaty Lviv (caretaker)
- 2018–: FC Motor Zaporizhzhia
- * Club domestic league appearances and goals

Anatoliy Dmytrovych Chantsev (Ukrainian: Анатолій Дмитрович Чанцев; born 20 February 1958) is a former defender and midfielder, now coach.
