= Oleh Lutkov =

Ukrainian footballer and coach

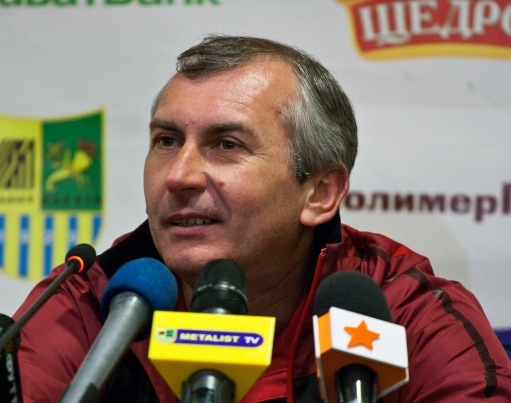

Personal information
- Full name: Oleh Anatoliyovych Lutkov
- Date of birth: 15 May 1966 (age 60)
- Place of birth: Zaporizhzhia, Ukraine
- Position: Goalkeeper

Senior career*
Years	Team	Apps	(Gls)
1984	Khisar Shakhrisabz		
1984	Pakhtakor Tashkent	0	(0)
1985	Zvezda Jizzakh	5	(0)
1987	Torpedo Zaporizhzhia	8	(0)
1988–1990	Zarafshon	53	(0)
1991–1992	Zvezda Irkutsk	70	(0)
1993	Torpedo Melitopol	9	(2)
1993–1994	Metalurh Zaporizhzhia	8	(0)
1994–1995	Viktor Zaporizhzhia	12	(0)
1996–1997	Metalurh Zaporizhzhia .	3	(0)
1997	Kryvbas Kryvyi Rih	2	(0)
1998	Metalurh Zaporizhzhia	2	(0)

Managerial career
- 1991–2001: FC Metalurh Zaporizhzhia (goalkeeping coach)
- 2001–2002: FC Metalurh-2 Zaporizhzhia
- 2002–2003: FC Metalurh Zaporizhzhia
- 2003–2005: FC Krymteplitsia Molodizhne
- 2005–2007: FC Ihroservice Simferopol
- 2007–2008: FC Lviv (goalkeeping coach)
- 2008–2009: FC Metalurh Zaporizhzhia
- 2010–2011: FC Metalurh Zaporizhzhia
- 2012–2013: FC Arsenal Bila Tserkva
- 2013–2014: FC Tytan Armyansk
- 2015: FC Veres Rivne
- 2019: PFC Sumy
- * Club domestic league appearances and goals

Oleh Anatoliyovych Lutkov (Ukrainian: Олег Анатолійович Лутков; born 15 May 1966) is a Ukrainian football coach and former player who played as a goalkeeper.
