= 1952 Football Championship of the Ukrainian SSR =

Football Championship of UkrSSR
- Season: 1952
- Champions: Metalurh Zaporizhia
- Promoted: Metalurh Zaporizhia, Metalurh Odesa, Metalurh Dnipropetrovsk

The 1952 Football Championship of UkrSSR were part of the 1952 Soviet republican football competitions in the Soviet Ukraine.

== Qualification group stage ==
=== Group 1 ===
| Pos | Team | Pld | W | D | L | GF | GA | GD | Pts |
|---|---|---|---|---|---|---|---|---|---|
| 1 | Traktor Kirovohrad | 22 | 14 | 8 | 0 | 53 | 15 | +38 | 36 |
| 2 | Lokomotyv Poltava | 22 | 14 | 6 | 2 | 48 | 18 | +30 | 34 |
| 3 | Mashynobudivnyk Kyiv | 25 | 13 | 7 | 5 | 73 | 20 | +53 | 33 |
| 4 | Bilshovyk Kyiv | 22 | 11 | 4 | 7 | 51 | 29 | +22 | 26 |
| 5 | Dynamo Proskuriv | 22 | 9 | 5 | 8 | 37 | 42 | −5 | 23 |
| 6 | Konotop | 22 | 9 | 4 | 9 | 24 | 30 | −6 | 22 |
| 7 | Dynamo Vinnytsia | 22 | 6 | 6 | 10 | 27 | 41 | −14 | 18 |
| 8 | Mashynobudivnyk Sumy | 22 | 4 | 10 | 8 | 23 | 40 | −17 | 18 |
| 9 | Mashynobudivnyk Pryluky | 22 | 6 | 5 | 11 | 24 | 38 | −14 | 17 |
| 10 | Dynamo Zhytomyr | 22 | 5 | 5 | 12 | 31 | 43 | −12 | 15 |
| 11 | Spartak Bila Tserkva | 22 | 5 | 4 | 13 | 32 | 51 | −19 | 14 |
| 12 | Chervona Zirka Chernihiv | 22 | 3 | 2 | 17 | 20 | 76 | −56 | 8 |

=== Group 2 ===
| Pos | Team | Pld | W | D | L | GF | GA | GD | Pts |
|---|---|---|---|---|---|---|---|---|---|
| 1 | Metalurh Zhdanov | 22 | 16 | 2 | 4 | 55 | 32 | +23 | 34 |
| 2 | Lokomotyv Artemivsk | 22 | 14 | 4 | 4 | 50 | 28 | +22 | 32 |
| 3 | Metalurh Voroshylovsk | 22 | 13 | 4 | 5 | 52 | 29 | +23 | 30 |
| 4 | Shakhtar Kadiivka | 22 | 12 | 5 | 5 | 55 | 27 | +28 | 29 |
| 5 | Torpedo Kharkiv | 22 | 10 | 6 | 6 | 46 | 29 | +17 | 26 |
| 6 | Dzerzhynets Voroshylovhrad | 22 | 7 | 8 | 7 | 53 | 38 | +15 | 22 |
| 7 | Avanhard Kramatorsk | 22 | 7 | 8 | 7 | 36 | 29 | +7 | 22 |
| 8 | Metalurh Staline | 22 | 9 | 3 | 10 | 24 | 29 | −5 | 21 |
| 9 | Metalurh Chasiv Yar | 22 | 8 | 4 | 10 | 32 | 40 | −8 | 20 |
| 10 | Metalurh Kostyantynivka | 22 | 2 | 8 | 12 | 28 | 48 | −20 | 12 |
| 11 | Lokomotyv Zaporizhia | 22 | 4 | 3 | 15 | 19 | 61 | −42 | 11 |
| 12 | Khimik Horlivka | 22 | 0 | 5 | 17 | 11 | 61 | −50 | 5 |

=== Group 3 ===
| Pos | Team | Pld | W | D | L | GF | GA | GD | Pts |
|---|---|---|---|---|---|---|---|---|---|
| 1 | Metalurh Zaporizhia | 22 | 17 | 3 | 2 | 70 | 15 | +55 | 37 |
| 2 | Chervonyi Prapor Mykolaiv | 22 | 13 | 5 | 4 | 32 | 16 | +16 | 31 |
| 3 | DO Odesa | 22 | 13 | 4 | 5 | 29 | 13 | +16 | 30 |
| 4 | Spartak Kherson | 22 | 14 | 2 | 6 | 41 | 25 | +16 | 30 |
| 5 | Mashynobudivnyk Dnipropetrovsk | 22 | 13 | 2 | 7 | 35 | 28 | +7 | 28 |
| 6 | Dynamo Dnipropetrovsk | 22 | 8 | 3 | 11 | 23 | 44 | −21 | 19 |
| 7 | Mykolaiv | 22 | 6 | 5 | 11 | 24 | 31 | −7 | 17 |
| 8 | Metalurh Odesa (P) | 22 | 5 | 6 | 11 | 32 | 37 | −5 | 16 |
| 9 | Metalurh Dniprodzerzhynsk | 22 | 5 | 6 | 11 | 19 | 45 | −26 | 16 |
| 10 | Dzerzhynets Kharkiv | 22 | 5 | 4 | 13 | 23 | 32 | −9 | 14 |
| 11 | Metalurh Kryvyi Rih | 22 | 5 | 4 | 13 | 24 | 33 | −9 | 14 |
| 12 | Vodnyk Izmail | 22 | 5 | 2 | 15 | 29 | 62 | −33 | 12 |

(P) Promoted

=== Group 4 ===
| Pos | Team | Pld | W | D | L | GF | GA | GD | Pts |
|---|---|---|---|---|---|---|---|---|---|
| 1 | Iskra Mukacheve | 22 | 16 | 4 | 2 | 57 | 19 | +38 | 36 |
| 2 | Spartak Uzhhorod | 22 | 16 | 3 | 3 | 70 | 11 | +59 | 35 |
| 3 | DO Lviv | 22 | 16 | 3 | 3 | 71 | 14 | +57 | 35 |
| 4 | Spartak Odesa | 22 | 12 | 5 | 5 | 29 | 23 | +6 | 29 |
| 5 | Kolhospnyk Berehove | 22 | 13 | 1 | 8 | 45 | 23 | +22 | 27 |
| 6 | Lokomotyv Rivne | 22 | 7 | 5 | 10 | 24 | 42 | −18 | 19 |
| 7 | Spartak Stanislav | 22 | 7 | 3 | 12 | 29 | 57 | −28 | 17 |
| 8 | Naftovyk Boryslav | 22 | 6 | 4 | 12 | 24 | 53 | −29 | 16 |
| 9 | Dynamo Lutsk | 22 | 6 | 3 | 13 | 38 | 54 | −16 | 15 |
| 10 | Dynamo Chernivtsi | 22 | 5 | 5 | 12 | 17 | 36 | −19 | 15 |
| 11 | Kharchovyk Vynnyky | 22 | 5 | 3 | 14 | 29 | 48 | −19 | 13 |
| 12 | Dynamo Ternopil | 22 | 3 | 1 | 18 | 20 | 63 | −43 | 7 |

== Final ==
| Pos | Team | Pld | W | D | L | GF | GA | GD | Pts | Qualification |
|---|---|---|---|---|---|---|---|---|---|---|
| 1 | FC Metalurh Zaporizhia (P) | 7 | 6 | 0 | 1 | 26 | 3 | +23 | 12 | Lost play-off |
| 2 | FC Chervonyi Styah Mykolaiv | 7 | 6 | 0 | 1 | 16 | 8 | +8 | 12 | |
| 3 | FC Iskra Mukacheve | 7 | 5 | 0 | 2 | 13 | 9 | +4 | 10 | |
| 4 | FC Spartak Uzhhorod | 7 | 3 | 1 | 3 | 15 | 12 | +3 | 7 | |
| 5 | FC Traktor Kirovohrad | 7 | 2 | 1 | 4 | 8 | 14 | −6 | 5 | |
| 6 | FC Lokomotyv Artemivsk | 7 | 1 | 3 | 3 | 8 | 17 | −9 | 5 | |
| 7 | FC Metalurh Zhdanov | 7 | 1 | 1 | 5 | 5 | 12 | −7 | 3 | |
| 8 | FC Lokomotyv Poltava | 7 | 1 | 0 | 6 | 4 | 20 | −16 | 2 | |

(P) Promoted

== Champion title playoff ==
- FC Metalurh Zaporizhia – FC Chervonyi Styah Mykolaiv 3:0

== Promotional playoff ==
- ODO Kiev – FC Metalurh Zaporizhia 3:0 3:1

== Ukrainian clubs at the All-Union level ==
- Class A (2): Dynamo Kyiv, Shakhtar Stalino
- Class B (2): Lokomotyv Kharkiv, DO Kyiv

== Number of teams by region ==
| Number | Region | Team(s) | |
| Number | Region | Ukrainian SSR | All-Union |
|---|---|---|---|
| 7 (1) | Donetsk Oblast | Metalurh Zhdanov, Lokomotyv Artemivsk, Avanhard Kramatorsk, Metalurh Stalino, Metalurh Chasiv Yar, Metalurh Kostiantynivka, Khimik Horlivka | Stakhanovets Stalino |
| 4 (0) | Dnipropetrovsk Oblast | Mashynobudivnyk Dnipropetrovsk, Dynamo Dnipropetrovsk, Metalurh Dniprodzerzhynsk, Metalurh Kryvyi Rih | – |
| 3 (2) | Kyiv Oblast | Mashynobudivnyk Kyiv, Bilshovyk Kyiv, Spartak Bila Tserkva | Dynamo Kyiv, DO Kyiv |
| 3 (0) | Luhansk Oblast | Metalurh Voroshylovsk, Shakhtar Kadiivka, Dzerzhynets Voroshylovhrad | – |
| 3 (0) | Zakarpattia Oblast | Iskra Mukachevo, Spartak Uzhhorod, Kolhospnyk Berehove | – |
| 3 (0) | Odesa Oblast | DO Odesa, Metalurh Odesa, Spartak Odesa | – |
| 2 (1) | Kharkiv Oblast | Torpedo Kharkiv, Dzerzhynets Kharkiv | Lokomotyv Kharkiv |
| 2 (0) | Zaporizhia Oblast | Lokomotyv Zaporizhia, Metalurh Zaporizhia | – |
| 2 (0) | Lviv Oblast | DO Lviv, Kharchovyk Vynnyky | – |
| 2 (0) | Mykolaiv Oblast | Chervonyi Prapor Mykolaiv, Mykolaiv | – |
| 2 (0) | Sumy Oblast | Konotop, Mashynobudivnyk Sumy | – |
| 2 (0) | Chernihiv Oblast | Mashynobudivnyk Pryluky, Chervona Zirka Chernihiv | – |
| 1 (0) | Kirovohrad Oblast | Traktor Kirovohrad | – |
| 1 (0) | (Soviet Union) Drohobych Oblast | Naftovyk Boryslav | – |
| 1 (0) | Poltava Oblast | Lokomotyv Poltava | – |
| 1 (0) | Vinnytsia Oblast | Dynamo Vinnytsia | – |
| 1 (0) | Ivano-Frankivsk Oblast | Spartak Stanislav | – |
| 1 (0) | Zhytomyr Oblast | Dynamo Zhytomyr | – |
| 1 (0) | Kherson Oblast | Spartak Kherson | – |
| 1 (0) | Chernivtsi Oblast | Dynamo Chernivtsi | – |
| 1 (0) | Rivne Oblast | Lokomotyv Rine | – |
| 1 (0) | Volyn Oblast | Dynamo Lutsk | – |
| 1 (0) | Khmelnytskyi Oblast | Dynamo Proskuriv | – |
| 1 (0) | (Soviet Union) Izmail Oblast | Vodnyk Izmail | – |
| 1 (0) | Ternopil Oblast | Dynamo Ternopil | – |
