= Gijs Luirink =

Dutch footballer (born 1983)

Personal information
- Full name: Gijs Luirink
- Date of birth: 12 September 1983 (age 43)
- Place of birth: Amsterdam, Netherlands
- Height: 1.89 m (6 ft 2 1/2 in)
- Position: Centre back

Youth career
- Abcoude
- Ajax

Senior career*
Years	Team	Apps	(Gls)
2001–2004	Volendam	57	(2)
2004–2006	Groningen	21	(1)
2006–2011	AZ	17	(1)
2009–2010	→ RKC Waalwijk (loan)	14	(0)
2011	→ SC Cambuur (loan)	16	(2)
2011–2014	Sparta Rotterdam	75	(7)
2014–2016	Volendam	43	(1)

International career
2006–2009	Netherlands U-21	7	(0)
Medal record
Men's football
Representing Netherlands
UEFA European Under-21 Championship
Winner	2006 Portugal
- * Club domestic league appearances and goals as of 9 June 2016

Gijs Luirink (Dutch pronunciation: [ɣɛis ˈlœyrɪŋk]; born 12 September 1983) is a Dutch former footballer who played as a centre back. He is a former Dutch under-21 international.

== Career ==
He began his career at FC Volendam, making 57 league appearances for the club. In 2004, the club was relegated to the Eerste Divisie, and Luirink moved to FC Groningen.

=== FC Groningen ===
At Groningen, he earned himself a place in the starting line-up as central defender, playing 20 games in Eredivisie, often partnering with Gibril Sankoh or Arnold Kruiswijk. In the season of 05/06, Luirink helped Groningen surprisingly achieve a fifth place and in the following play-offs UEFA cup football. Halfway through the season, Groningen left the Oosterpark Stadium for a new home, the Euroborg. This quickly got the nickname of "the green hell", because it was very difficult for other teams to win there. In the league competition Groningen were unbeaten at their new stadium, only PSV won there in a cup match.

=== AZ ===
As he made a good impression at Groningen and for the Dutch U-21, AZ acted quickly and signed him. He started as a regular, but he appeared in only 16 matches for AZ in the season 06/07 because he picked up some severe injuries that kept him out most of the season. Having not made any appearances in the season 07/08 due to injury, Luirink played during the preparation of the following season but lightning struck again for Luirink, and he suffered another heavy knee injury, and during recovery things got worse as he had several setbacks and suffered from thrombosis in his leg. Despite all that, he recovered and was ready to return in the squad halfway through the season 08/09. Making his official return as a substitute on January twelfth, 2009 in a friendly match against AGOVV. Whilst at AZ he won the 2008–09 Eredivisie.

=== RKC Waalwijk ===
On 14 August 2009 left AZ Alkmaar to play on loan for RKC Waalwijk, his contract ran over one year.

=== SC Cambuur ===
Due to many injuries Luirink was sent on loan to Cambuur until the end of the season. Then his contract will end and he his free to join a new team.

=== Sparta Rotterdam ===
On 21 June 2011, Luirink moved from AZ to the Eerste Divisie side Sparta Rotterdam, signing a two-year contract.

=== FC Volendam ===
After he lost prospect of playing in the first eleven, Luirink made a transfer to FC Volendam as a free agent.

== Position ==
He is considered as a tall and strong central defender, first acknowledged by former U-21 coach Foppe de Haan for his strong performances at FC Groningen. However, he has been haunted by injury for several seasons. Preventing him from making his final breakthrough.

== International career ==
He was the captain of the Dutch squad that won the UEFA U-21 Championship in 2006. He made the preselection of the Dutch squad for a match with Ireland in August 2006.
