= Oleksiy Hodin =

Ukrainian footballer (born 1983)

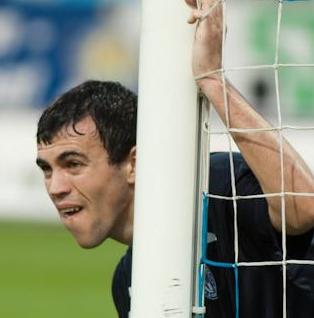

Personal information
- Date of birth: 2 February 1983 (age 43)
- Place of birth: Zaporizhzhia, Soviet Union
- Height: 1.79 m (5 ft 10 in)
- Position: Midfielder

Team information
- Current team: Kremin Kremenchuk (manager)

Senior career*
Years	Team	Apps	(Gls)
1999–2009	Metalurh Zaporizhzhia	132	(11)
1999–2003	→ Metalurh-2 Zaporizhzhia (loan)	62	(6)
2006	→ Tavriya Simferopol (loan)	5	(1)
2009–2012	Metalurh Donetsk	39	(4)
2013–2015	Metalurh Zaporizhzhia	13	(2)
2015	Šiauliai	9	(3)
2016	TSK Simferopol	1	(0)
2018	Metalurh Zaporizhzhia	2	(0)

International career
1999–2000	Ukraine U17	3	(0)
2004–2005	Ukraine U21	5	(0)

Managerial career
- 2019–2020: Metalurh Zaporizhia (interim)
- 2021: Kremin Kremenchuk
Medal record
Men's football
Representing Ukraine
UEFA European Under-21 Championship
Runner-up	2006 Portugal
- * Club domestic league appearances and goals

Oleksiy Hodin (born 2 February 1983) is a Ukrainian football coach and former player who played as a midfielder for Metalurh Zaporizhzhia.

== Club career ==
Born in Zaporizhzhya, Hodin was a graduate of the Metalurh Zaporizhzhia youth sports school, and would play club football for ten seasons with the senior side. He appeared in more than 200 competitive matches for Metalurh, and appeared for the club during its run to the 2006 Ukrainian Cup Final.

He signed on 17 June 2009 with Metalurh Donetsk.

== International career ==
Hodin was a member of the Ukraine squad which reached the final of the 2006 UEFA European Under-21 Football Championship in Portugal, he played only five games for the Ukraine.

== Honours ==
Ukraine U21

- UEFA Under-21 Championship: runner-up 2006
