= Bruno Vale =

Portuguese footballer (born 1983)

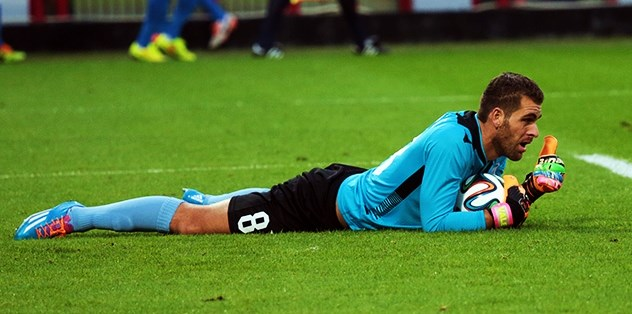
- Vale in 2014

Personal information
- Full name: Bruno Miguel Esteves do Vale
- Date of birth: 8 April 1983 (age 43)
- Place of birth: Mafamude, Portugal
- Height: 1.93 m (6 ft 4 in)
- Position: Goalkeeper

Youth career
- 1992–1997: Vilanovense
- 1997–2001: Porto

Senior career*
Years	Team	Apps	(Gls)
2001–2005	Porto B	119	(0)
2003–2010	Porto	1	(0)
2005–2006	→ Estrela Amadora (loan)	30	(0)
2006–2007	→ União Leiria (loan)	2	(0)
2007–2008	→ Varzim (loan)	7	(0)
2008–2009	→ Vitória Setúbal (loan)	7	(0)
2009–2010	→ Belenenses (loan)	16	(0)
2010–2012	Oliveirense	57	(0)
2012–2019	Apollon Limassol	229	(0)
2019–2020	Oliveirense	8	(0)
Total		476	(0)

International career
1999	Portugal U15	4	(0)
2000	Portugal U16	10	(0)
2000	Portugal U17	4	(0)
2001–2002	Portugal U19	9	(0)
2003–2004	Portugal U20	13	(0)
2004–2006	Portugal U21	19	(0)
2004	Portugal U23	1	(0)
2005–2006	Portugal B	2	(0)
2003	Portugal	1	(0)
Medal record
Men's football
Representing Portugal
UEFA European Under-21 Championship
Third place	2004 Germany
UEFA European Under-17 Championship
Winner	2000 Israel
- * Club domestic league appearances and goals

Bruno Miguel Esteves do Vale (born 8 April 1983) is a Portuguese former professional footballer who played as a goalkeeper.

He spent most of his career in Cyprus with Apollon Limassol after being brought up at Porto, appearing in 316 competitive matches for the former club.

== Career ==
Vale was born in Mafamude, Vila Nova de Gaia. A product of FC Porto's youth system, he was surprisingly picked for a Portugal match against Kazakhstan in August 2003, where he played 22 minutes as a substitute in a 1–0 friendly win; at the time, he was only third choice at his club. The following year, he represented the nation at the Summer Olympic Games, backing S.L. Benfica's José Moreira.

Subsequently, Vale played the 2005–06 season on loan to C.F. Estrela da Amadora in the Primeira Liga, also being selected to the 2006 FIFA World Cup. However, he injured his foot in a game against Germany in the UEFA European Under-21 Championship, and was forced to pull out of the squad.

In 2006–07, Vale was loaned again, to top-division side U.D. Leiria. He went almost unnoticed there, moving the following campaign to the Segunda Liga with Varzim SC.

Vale was yet again loaned in July 2008, spending 2008–09 at Vitória de Setúbal in the top flight. The same happened in the following summer, and he again was backup or third choice in the 2009–10 season, now at Lisbon-based C.F. Os Belenenses– an injury to Nélson Pereira eventually propelled him to the starting eleven, as the club suffered top-tier relegation as second-bottom.

In the 2010 off-season, Vale was finally released by Porto, resuming his career with U.D. Oliveirense of the second division. On 26 June 2012, the 29-year-old moved abroad for the first time, signing a two-year contract with Apollon Limassol FC in the Cypriot First Division.

Vale returned to Portugal and Oliveirense after seven years in June 2019, with the 36-year-old agreeing to a one-year deal. On 4 June 2020, he announced his retirement.

== Career statistics ==
As of 17 May 2019

Appearances and goals by club, season and competition
Club	Season	League			Cup		Other		Total	
Club	Season	Division	Apps	Goals	Apps	Goals	Apps	Goals	Apps	Goals
Porto	2002–03	Primeira Liga	0	0	0	0	0	0	0	0
Porto	2003–04	Primeira Liga	1	0	0	0	0	0	1	0
Porto	2004–05	Primeira Liga	0	0	0	0	0	0	0	0
Porto	Total		1	0	0	0	0	0	1	0
Estrela Amadora (loan)	2005–06	Primeira Liga	30	0	0	0	—		30	0
União Leiria (loan)	2006–07	Primeira Liga	2	0	0	0	—		2	0
Varzim (loan)	2007–08	Segunda Liga	7	0	1	0	—		8	0
Vitória Setúbal (loan)	2008–09	Primeira Liga	7	0	3	0	2 (Note: Appearances in UEFA Europa League and UEFA Cup)	0	12	0
Belenenses (loan)	2009–10	Primeira Liga	16	0	2	0	—		18	0
Oliveirense	2010–11	Segunda Liga	29	0	5	0	—		34	0
Oliveirense	2011–12	Segunda Liga	28	0	2	0	—		30	0
Oliveirense	Total		57	0	7	0	—		64	0
Apollon Limassol	2012–13	Cypriot First Division	28	0	7	0	—		35	0
Apollon Limassol	2013–14	Cypriot First Division	36	0	7	0	6	0	49	0
Apollon Limassol	2014–15	Cypriot First Division	32	0	2	0	7	0	41	0
Apollon Limassol	2015–16	Cypriot First Division	35	0	7	0	6	0	48	0
Apollon Limassol	2016–17	Cypriot First Division	33	0	6	0	2	0	41	0
Apollon Limassol	2017–18	Cypriot First Division	35	0	7	0	11	0	55	0
Apollon Limassol	2018–19	Cypriot First Division	30	0	4	0	13	0	47	0
Apollon Limassol	Total		229	0	40	0	45	0	316	0
Career total			349	0	53	0	47	0	451	0

== Honours ==
Porto

- Primeira Liga: 2003–04

Apollon Limassol

- Cypriot Cup: 2012–13, 2015–16, 2016–17
- Cypriot Super Cup: 2016, 2017

Portugal Under-16

- UEFA European Under-16 Championship: 2000

Individual

- Toulon Tournament Best Goalkeeper: 2003
