= Vladimir Khodus =

Russian footballer and manager

Personal information
- Full name: Vladimir Alekseyevich Khodus
- Date of birth: 13 July 1952 (age 74)
- Place of birth: Petrovskoye, Russian SFSR
- Height: 1.76 m (5 ft 9 1/2 in)
- Positions: Defender; midfielder

Team information
- Current team: Peresvet Domodedovo (assistant manager)

Senior career*
Years	Team	Apps	(Gls)
1975	Dynamo Stavropol	33	(1)
1976–1977	Dynamo Makhachkala	62	(3)
1978–1980	Metalurh Zaporizhzhia	81	(7)
1980–1981	Metalurh Dniprodzerzhynsk	63	(9)
1982	Spartak Kostroma	4	(0)
1983–1985	Torpedo Zaporizhzhia		

Managerial career
- 1985–1989: Torpedo Zaporizhzhia (academy)
- 1990: Torpedo Zaporizhzhia (assistant)
- 1991: Vorskla Poltava
- 1992–1993: Turbacz Mszana Dolna
- 1994–1995: Dynamo Stavropol (assistant)
- 1995–1998: Al-Ahed
- 2000–2001: Al-Nahda
- 2003–2004: Al-Orouba
- 2005: Olkom Melitopol
- 2009: Metalurh Zaporizhzhia (assistant)
- 2009: Metalurh Zaporizhzhia
- 2009: Metalurh Zaporizhzhia (assistant)
- 2009: Metalurh Zaporizhzhia
- 2009–2012: Metalurh-2 Zaporizhzhia (assistant)
- 2014: FC Ajax Zaporizhzhia
- 2014–2016: AFM Avangard Moscow
- 2017: Znamya Truda Orekhovo-Zuyevo
- 2017–2019: Kafa Feodosia
- 2022: Peresvet Domodedovo (caretaker)
- 2022–: Peresvet Domodedovo (assistant)
- * Club domestic league appearances and goals

Vladimir Alekseyevich Khodus (Russian: Владимир Алексеевич Ходус; born 13 July 1952) is a Russian football manager and a former player. He is the assistant manager of Peresvet Domodedovo.
