= 2006 UEFA European Under-21 Championship =

Campeonato Europeu de Futebol Sub-21 de 2006

Tournament details
- Host country: Portugal
- Dates: 23 May – 4 June
- Teams: 8 (finals); 48 (qualifying)
- Venues: 6 (in 6 host cities)

Final positions
- Champions: Netherlands (1st title)
- Runners-up: Ukraine

Tournament statistics
- Matches played: 15
- Goals scored: 34 (2.27 per match)
- Attendance: 180,942 (12,063 per match)
- Top scorer: (Netherlands) Klaas-Jan Huntelaar (4 goals)
- Best player: (Netherlands) Klaas-Jan Huntelaar

2006 UEFA European Under-21 Championship was the 15th staging of UEFA's European Under-21 Championship. In December 2005, Portugal was selected to host the finals of the competition, which took place from 23 May–4 June 2006. The tournament was won by the Netherlands, who beat Ukraine 3–0 in the final.

The finals tournament featured two groups of four, with the winners and runners up of each group going through to the semi-finals. The draw for the finals groups took place on 8 February 2006.

== The Finals ==
The finals took place between 23 May and 4 June 2006 in Portugal.

=== Venues ===
- Estádio Municipal de Águeda, Águeda
- Estádio Municipal de Aveiro, Aveiro
- Estádio Cidade de Barcelos, Barcelos
- Estádio Municipal de Braga, Braga
- Estádio D. Afonso Henriques, Guimarães
- Estádio do Bessa, Porto

=== Squads ===
Players born after 1 January 1983 were eligible to play.

== Matches ==
=== Group stage ===
==== Group A ====
Team	Pld	W	D	L	GF	GA	GD	Pts
France	3	3	0	0	6	0	+6	9
Serbia and Montenegro	3	1	0	2	2	3	−1	3
Portugal	3	1	0	2	1	3	−2	3
Germany	3	1	0	2	1	4	−3	3

23 May 2006
17:15

Serbia and Montenegro	0–1	Germany
	Report	Polanski 61'

Estádio Cidade de Barcelos, Barcelos
Attendance: 3,245
Referee: Serge Gumienny (Belgium)
23 May 2006
19:45

Portugal	0–1	France
	Report	Vale 41' (o.g.)

Estádio Municipal de Braga, Braga
Attendance: 25,146
Referee: Howard Webb (England)

25 May 2006
17:15

France	3–0	Germany
Sinama Pongolle 45'; Gouffran 71'; Mavuba 75'	Report

Estádio D. Afonso Henriques, Guimarães
Attendance: 8,023
Referee: Alberto Undiano Mallenco (Spain)
25 May 2006
19:45

Portugal	0–2	Serbia and Montenegro
	Report	Castro 17' (o.g.); Ivanović 65'

Estádio Cidade de Barcelos, Barcelos
Attendance: 9,968
Referee: Martin Hansson (Sweden)

28 May 2006
19:45

Germany	0–1	Portugal
	Report	Moutinho 90+4'

Estádio D. Afonso Henriques, Guimarães
Attendance: 28,174
Referee: Alon Yefet (Israel)
28 May 2006
19:45

France	2–0	Serbia and Montenegro
Bergougnoux 33'; Toulalan 54'	Report

Estádio Municipal de Braga, Braga
Attendance: 8,545
Referee: Gerald Lehner (Austria)

==== Group B ====
Team	Pld	W	D	L	GF	GA	GD	Pts
Ukraine	3	2	0	1	4	3	+1	6
Netherlands	3	1	1	1	3	3	0	4
Italy	3	1	1	1	4	4	0	4
Denmark	3	0	2	1	5	6	−1	2

24 May 2006
17:15

Ukraine	2–1	Netherlands
Milevskyi 39' (pen.); Fomin 51'	Report	Luirink 90+2'

Estádio Municipal de Águeda, Águeda
Attendance: 4,250
Referee: Gerald Lehner (Austria)
24 May 2006
19:45

Italy	3–3	Denmark
Potenza 16'; Palladino 61'; Bianchi 90'	Report	Würtz 21'; Kahlenberg 33'; Andreasen 41'

Estádio Municipal de Aveiro, Aveiro
Attendance: 11,250
Referee: Alon Yefet (Israel)

26 May 2006
17:15

Denmark	1–1	Netherlands
Kahlenberg 48'	Report	Huntelaar 38'

Estádio Municipal de Aveiro, Aveiro
Attendance: 8,021
Referee: Serge Gumienny (Belgium)
26 May 2006
19:45

Italy	1–0	Ukraine
Chiellini 90+3'	Report

Estádio Municipal de Águeda, Águeda
Attendance: 6,873
Referee: Howard Webb (England)

29 May 2006
19:45

Netherlands	1–0	Italy
De Ridder 74'	Report

Estádio Municipal de Aveiro, Aveiro
Attendance: 14,323
Referee: Martin Hansson (Sweden)
29 May 2006
19:45

Denmark	1–2	Ukraine
Kahlenberg 43'	Report	Fomin 31'; Milevskyi 84'

Estádio Municipal de Águeda, Águeda
Attendance: 5,734
Referee: Alberto Undiano Mallenco (Spain)

=== Knockout stage ===
Semi-finals
1 June – Braga
France	2
Netherlands (a.e.t.)	3
1 June – Aveiro
Ukraine (p)	0 (5)
Serbia and Montenegro	0 (4)

Final
4 June – Porto
Netherlands	3
Ukraine	0

==== Semi-finals ====
1 June 2006
17:15

France	2–3 (a.e.t.)	Netherlands
Faubert 51'; Bergougnoux 85'	Report	Hofs 6', 107'; Huntelaar 38'

Estádio Municipal de Braga, Braga
Attendance: 7,887
Referee: Alberto Undiano Mallenco (Spain)

1 June 2006
19:45

Ukraine	0–0 (a.e.t.)	Serbia and Montenegro
	Report
Penalties
Aliyev (penalty missed); Fomin (penalty scored); Chyhrynskyi (penalty scored); Hodin (penalty scored); Yatsenko (penalty scored); Maksymov (penalty scored)	5–4	(penalty missed) Janković; (penalty scored) Milijaš; (penalty scored) Milovanović; (penalty scored) Basta; (penalty scored) Lomić; (penalty missed) Purović

Estádio Municipal de Aveiro, Aveiro
Attendance: 17,357
Referee: Howard Webb (England)

==== Final ====
4 June 2006
19:45

Netherlands	3–0	Ukraine
Huntelaar 11', 43' (pen.); Hofs 90+3'	Report

Estádio do Bessa, Porto
Attendance: 22,146
Referee: Martin Hansson (Sweden)

GK	1	Kenneth Vermeer
DF	16	Dwight Tiendalli
DF	17	Ron Vlaar	(yellow card) 74'
DF	3	Gijs Luirink
DF	5	Urby Emanuelson
MF	10	Ismaïl Aissati		(substituted off) 78'
MF	20	Demy de Zeeuw
MF	6	Stijn Schaars
MF	8	Nicky Hofs
FW	9	Klaas-Jan Huntelaar
FW	7	Romeo Castelen		(substituted off) 69'
Substitutions:
FW	11	Daniël de Ridder		(substituted on) 69'
DF	4	Ramon Zomer		(substituted on) 78'
Coach:
(Netherlands) Foppe de Haan

GK	1	Andriy Pyatov
DF	15	Hryhoriy Yarmash	(yellow card) 38'
DF	6	Dmytro Chyhrynskyi
DF	5	Oleksandr Yatsenko	(yellow card) 42'
DF	2	Oleksandr Romanchuk	(yellow card) 26' (yellow-red card) 77'
MF	17	Taras Mykhalyk
MF	18	Oleksiy Hodin		(substituted off) 46'
MF	14	Yevhen Cheberyachko
MF	19	Oleksandr Maksymov
FW	10	Artem Milevskyi
FW	11	Ruslan Fomin		(substituted off) 46'
Substitutions:
FW	7	Maksym Feshchuk	(yellow card) 59'	(substituted on) 46'
FW	8	Oleksandr Aliyev		(substituted on) 46'
Coach:
(Ukraine) Oleksiy Mykhaylychenko

Assistant referees:
Fredrik Nilsson (Sweden)
Roger East (England)
Fourth official:
Howard Webb (England)

== Goalscorers ==
4 goals

- (Netherlands) Klaas-Jan Huntelaar

3 goals

- (Denmark) Thomas Kahlenberg
- (Netherlands) Nicky Hofs

2 goals

- (France) Bryan Bergougnoux
- (Ukraine) Ruslan Fomin
- (Ukraine) Artem Milevskyi

1 goal

- (Denmark) Leon Andreasen
- (Denmark) Rasmus Würtz
- (France) Julien Faubert
- (France) Yoan Gouffran
- (France) Rio Mavuba
- (France) Florent Sinama Pongolle
- (France) Jérémy Toulalan
- (Germany) Eugen Polanski
- (Italy) Rolando Bianchi
- (Italy) Giorgio Chiellini
- (Italy) Raffaele Palladino
- (Italy) Alessandro Potenza
- (Netherlands) Gijs Luirink
- (Netherlands) Daniël de Ridder
- (Portugal) João Moutinho
- (Serbia and Montenegro) Branislav Ivanović

1 own goal

- (Portugal) Bruno Vale (against France)
- (Portugal) Zé Castro (against Serbia and Montenegro)
