= FC Metalurh Zaporizhzhia =

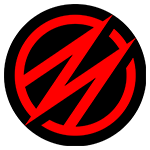
- Full name: Football Club Metalurh Zaporizhzhia
- Nickname: The Cossacks
- Founded: 1935, 2016 (Roso Nero), 2017
- Dissolved: 2016, 2018
- Ground: Slavutych Arena
- Capacity: 12,000
- Owner: City of Zaporizhia
- Director: Maksym Lupashko
- Head coach: Serhiy Kovalets (Note: since 15 January 2026)
- League: Ukrainian First League
- 2023–24: Ukrainian First League, 17th of 20
- Website: mfcmetalurg.com
Home colours	Away colours

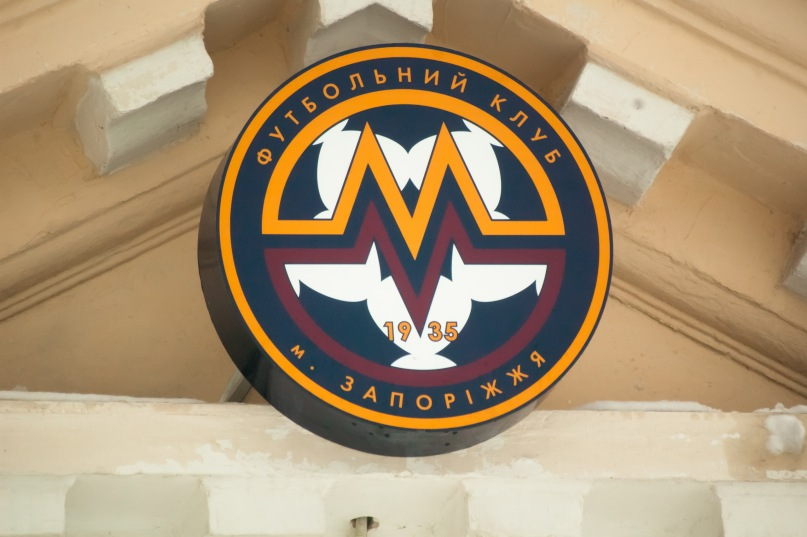
Club logo used from 2005 to 2015

FC Metalurh Zaporizhzhia" (Ukrainian: Спортивний клуб «Металу́рг» Запорі́жжя, IPA: [metɐˈlurɦ zɐpoˈr⁽ʲ⁾iʒːɐ]) is a Ukrainian professional football club based in Zaporizhzhia. Reestablished in 2017, it is a "phoenix club" of the original Soviet factory "team of masters" Metalurh that existed in 1935–2016 of the Soviet metallurgical giant Zaporizhstal.

The original club holds several historical records of Soviet football, particularly while participating in the Soviet second tier (in 1971–1991 known as the First League). The club has spent the highest number of seasons in the Soviet second tier, as well as earned the highest number of tournament points. The club is also a three-time champion of the Ukrainian republican competitions. Just before the dissolution of the Soviet Union, the team of masters Metalurh Zaporizhia was transformed into a commercial football club.

In 2017, the city of Zaporizhia administration reestablished the football club as Miskyi Football Club Metalurh Zaporizhia. In December 2024, the organization designation was changed to a sports club at the decision of the city council.

== History ==
=== Early years (1935–1946) ===
The history of Metalurg began in 1935 when a steel production company, Zaporizhstal, formed the football club 'Stal'. By the end of the year a local sports union gave Stal the status of a main club in the region. Throughout the 1930s, the team appeared regularly in domestic competitions and often played against clubs from the Soviet Top League, the most notable of which was Spartak Moscow. The tough times of World War II soon followed, however, bringing decline to both Zaporizhstal and its team. Nonetheless, in 1946 the club was revived and in 1949, Stal won the cup in Zaporizhzhia Oblast.

=== Post-war era (1946–1990) ===
In October 1949, the team was renamed to 'Metalurg'. In 1950, Metalurg debuts in the USSR Cup and in the round of 64 they defeated Lokomotiv Petrozavodsk with the score of 5–0, but go out in the next stage, losing 2–3 to Torpedo Stalingrad. However, the very next year the club went to the Round of 16, notably defeating Dinamo Minsk 1–0 and Lokomotiv Moscow 4–0 on the way. In 1953, the club debuted in the USSR Championship after becoming the champion of Ukrainian SSR in 1952. From 1953 to 1962, Metalurg played in the USSR Championship Class 'B'.

In 1963, Metalurg secured a place in the USSR Championship division 'A' and achieved some moderate success. They stayed there until 1971, when in the 1970 season the club secured a position in Class 'A' and a place in the USSR First League. In their first season, they came in fourth place, which became the club's highest achievement in the USSR Championships.

=== Ukrainian leagues (1991–2015) ===
In 1991 after the collapse of the Soviet Union, Ukraine became independent and Ukrainian Premier League was formed. Metalurh was among the founders of the League. The club has remained in the Vyshcha Liga for all 16 seasons with their highest achievement in the 1995–96 season, taking 5th place. The club's best performance in a domestic cup came in 2006, when Metalurh reached the final, there they met with Dynamo Kyiv and were beaten 2 goals to none, however this performance allowed them to enter the UEFA Cup next season. Zaporizhstal still remains as a largest club sponsor and actively finances most of club's expenses.

The club had always been in the top league, since the first season in 1992 until the 2010–11 season when they finished last position and were relegated to the Ukrainian First League. After one season in the Ukrainian First League the club was promoted back to the Ukrainian Premier League. During the 2015–16 season on 2 March 2016, Metalurh was recognized as bankrupt on decision of the commercial court of Zaporizhzhia Oblast and a liquidation procedure was initiated.

European history

Throughout its history in Ukrainian Premier League, Metalurh has entered the UEFA Cup on two occasions; the first in 2002–03 UEFA Cup after finishing fourth in the league the previous season. In the qualifying round they beat Maltese side Birkirkara 3–0 on aggregate, before losing 2–1 to English side Leeds United in the first round.

The second time club had to wait 4 years to qualify again. After finishing as runners-up in the Ukrainian Cup in 2006, Metalurh secured a place in the 2006–07 UEFA Cup. The club entered the competition in the second qualifying round, Metalurh defeated Moldavian side Zimbru Chișinău 3–0 over two legs. However, Metalurh went out in the first stage, losing to Greek club Panathinaikos.

=== FC Metallurh based on FC Rosso Nero (2016–2018) ===
FC Rosso Nero was created in 2009 by Andriy Bohatchenko who owns a pizzeria with the same name in Zaporizhzhia. The first two seasons the club played in futsal (indoor football). In 2011, the club won the Zaporizhzhia city Cup and the beach football city league. In 2012, Rosso Nero were runners-up at 8x8 football (variant of association football popular in Russia). In 2014, the club became a city champions by beating the defending city champions Motor Zaporizhzhia. The victory inspired Rosso Nero to apply for the Second League of national competitions. In fall of 2015, when Metalurh Zaporizhzhia started the process for liquidation, Rosso Nero offered to pass the legendary club to them, however no agreement was reached.

On 26 March 2016, in Zaporizhzhia held a meeting of non-governmental organization "Metalurh forever", at which it was decided to rename the "FC Rosso Nero" into "FC Metalurh". At the same meeting, the group adopted symbols and colors of the original club "Metalurh". During the 2016–17 season the club was under suspicion from the FFU fair play committee.

The club was denied in receiving certificate for the next season and was dissolved in June 2018. The Metalurh—Rosso Nero performance was terrible. It played 65 games at professional level (3rd tier) winning 9, tying 3 and losing 53 games. Its goal tallies was 49 goals scored while allowing 237 (-188). The Metalurh—Rosso Nero also took part in Ukrainian Cup where it was eliminated at its earliest rounds on both occasions.

=== Zaporizhia city club (since 2017) ===
On 6 August 2017, a new city football club MFC Metalurh Zaporizhzhia (Ukrainian: міський футбольний клуб "Металург" (Запоріжжя)) started its participation in the 2017–18 Ukrainian Football Amateur League with an away game against Yarud at Azovets Stadium in Mariupol. In the media, it was sometimes called the municipal club rather than the city's club. In 2016, the new club was established by the Zaporizhzhia city authorities based on a communal company "Tsentralnyi Stadion" (Central Stadium), which owns Slavutych Arena.

Following the dissolution of the Soviet Union in 1991, the club remained a member of the Ukrainian top tier until 2015, competing on a couple of occasions in European club competitions as Ukraine's representative.

In 2015, the original club went bankrupt, and in 2016, the Ukrainian Premier League finally removed it from its competitions. In 2016, it was announced that another amateur club from Zaporizhzhia (FC Rosso-Nero Zaporizhzhia) had officially changed its name to FC Metalurh Zaporizhzhia and intends to start participation at the Ukrainian Amateur Football League the same year.

In 2018, the Rosso-Nero's Metalurh was denied a license for professional league competitions, while the city-sponsored club was admitted to the Second League.

With Metalurh–Rosso Nero already competing, in May 2017, the mayor of Zaporizhzhia decided to form a separate city club, which was formed based on the existing Metalurh sports school of Olympic Reserve. On 31 May 2017, the Zaporizhzhia City Council approved the mayor's initiative and created the city's club Metalurh Zaporizhzhia. On proposition of the Rosso-Nero's Metalurh to merge, the newly created club refused.

Youth Sports School of Metalurh Zaporizhya

The youth sports school is located right on the training fields of the main club, where, before the Russian-Ukrainian war, matches of the local championship of other sports schools were regularly held. this is the largest youth sports school in the city of Zaporizhzhia, as well as in the entire region.

== Stadium ==
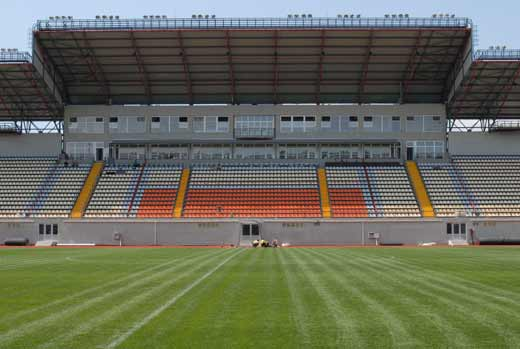
Slavutych Arena

Throughout their history, the club has played in various stadiums around Zaporizhzhia, but in 2001 the Football Federation of Ukraine forbade Metalurh from playing in their home stadium, Tsentarlnyi Metalurh Stadium, due to security concern and the club was forced to play at the Avto ZAZ Stadium (which formerly belong to now-bankrupt Torpedo Zaporizhzhia). Soon after, the club's board approved plans to construct a brand new stadium for the team in place of the old one. Construction commenced in late 2004 and on 29 July 2006, Slavutych Arena was opened, in their first game on a new stadium Metalurh faced Ukrainian giants Dynamo Kyiv. The stadium is situated in a central part of the city, on a street that has been recently renamed after legendary Ukrainian player and coach Valery Lobanovsky.

The stadium is purposed for football only use and has a total capacity of 12,000 seats. It consists out of four separate stands, north, south, east and west, two of which are covered by a roof, stadium is equipped with a single, multi-colour screen with dimensions of 6x10m and a lighting system of 1400 lux. The pitch dimensions are 105х68 м. Lately it has often been used as a venue for the Ukrainian Premier League FC Zorya Luhansk, while Metalurh is forced to play at its own training base. Metalurh Training Base is also known as Velykyi Luh (Great Meadow).

== Club's crests and logos ==
Metalurh owned by Motor Sich

Metalurh owned by the city of Zaporizhzhia

== Sponsors ==
The history of FC Metalurh dates back to a factory team 'Stal' that has been sponsored by one of the largest steel production companies in Ukraine, Zaporizhstal. The company has remained a sponsor of the club for over 70 years and now is a general sponsor of the club. The main partner of the club is OAO Zaporizhstalbud-1.

- 1935–2012: Zaporizhstal (Ihor Dvoretskyi)
- 2012–2015: Motor Sich (Oleksandr Bohuslayev)
- 2016–2018: Rosso-Nero Pizza (Andriy Bohatchenko)
- 2017–present: city of Zaporizhzhia

=== Football kits and sponsors ===
Years	Football kit	Shirt sponsor
1999–04	Umbro	Zaporizhstal
2004–05	Lotto	Zaporizhstal
2005–06	Lotto/Adidas	Zaporizhstal
2006–09	Adidas	Zaporizhstal
2009–10	Nike/Adidas	Zaporizhstal
2010–11	Nike	Zaporizhstal
2012–13	Nike	-
2013–14	Adidas	-
2016–17	Joma	UNIQA

== Honours ==
- Soviet First League:
  - Winners: 1960
  - Runners-up: 1958
- Soviet Second League:
  - Winners: 1970
- Ukrainian Cup:
  - Runners-up: 2006
- Ukrainian First League:
  - Runners-up: 2011–12
- Championship of the Ukrainian SSR:
  - Winners: 1952, 1960, 1970
- Cup of the Ukrainian SSR:
  - Winners: 1951, 1952
  - Runners-up: 1950

== Players ==
=== Current squad ===
As of 23 June 2026

Note: Flags indicate national team as defined under FIFA eligibility rules; some limited exceptions apply. Players may hold more than one non-FIFA nationality.

No.	Pos.	Nation	Player23
2	DF	UKR	Nikita Levchenko
3	DF	UKR	Denys Doroshenko
7	MF	UKR	Dmitry Irodovskyi
8	MF	UKR	Andrii Savitskyi
9	FW	UKR	Vladyslav Nekhtiy
10	MF	UKR	Daniil Zelinskyi
14	FW	UKR	Artem Sitalo
16	MF	UKR	Maksym Vorona
17	DF	UKR	Ihor Yurechko
19	FW	UKR	Vladyslav Borysenko
20	FW	UKR	Yaroslav Dzyubko
22	DF	UKR	Danylo Izotov

No.	Pos.	Nation	Player
23	DF	UKR	Dmytro Slyusar
25	MF	UKR	Maksym Misanov
27	DF	UKR	Vladyslav Klymenko
28	DF	UKR	Mykhaylo Rudavskyi
29	FW	UKR	Radion Lisniak
33	GK	UKR	Yakov Shmitko
50	MF	UKR	Danylo Kirichenko
76	GK	UKR	Viktor Mokrytskyi
77	MF	UKR	Oleksiy Bandurin
90	MF	UKR	Yehor Zaichenko
91	DF	UKR	Ivan Mamrosenko
97	MF	UKR	Suleyman Seytkhalilov
99	FW	UKR	Kyrylo Bilyaev

== Coaching staff ==
- Head coach – Serhiy Kovalets

== League and Cup history ==
=== Soviet Union ===
Season	Div.	Pos.	Pl.	W	D	L	GS	GA	P	Domestic Cup	Europe	Notes
1950	4th (Republican)	4								1/32 finals		
1951	4th (Republican)	4								1/8 finals		
1952	4th (Republican)	1								1/64 finals		Won championship game, Champion of Ukraine
1953	2nd (Class B)	3 (Group 3)	14	6	3	5	34	26	15	1/8 finals		In play-offs Metalurh Odesa 1–4 and Torpedo Rostov/Donu 4–5
1954	2nd (Class B)	3 (Group 3)	22	11	5	6	34	24	27	1/32 finals		
1955	2nd (Class B)	8 (Group 1)	30	13	6	11	37	33	32	1/32 finals		
1956	2nd (Class B)	3 (Group 1)	34	21	4	9	54	35	46			
1957	2nd (Class B)	8 (Group 1)	34	14	11	9	41	34	39	1/16 finals		
1958	2nd (Class B)	2 (Group 2)	30	17	5	8	55	29	39	1/64 finals		
1959	2nd (Class B)	6 (Group 1)	28	14	4	10	40	30	32			
1960	2nd (Group B of UkrSSR)	1 (Group 2)	36	25	9	2	78	29	59	1/128 finals		Won championship play-off over Sudnobudivnyk; Lost promotion play-off to FC Shakhtar Donetsk
1961	2nd (Group B of UkrSSR)	4 (Group 2)	36	15	12	9	50	37	42	1/128 finals		Lost play-off to SKA Lviv, placed 8th overall
1962	2nd (Group B of UkrSSR)	2 (Group 2)	24	13	5	6	42	21	31	1/64 finals		Qualified for promotion group
1962	2nd (Group B of UkrSSR)	6	10	1	5	4	13	22	7			promotion group
1963	2nd (Class A Second Group)	4	34	12	17	5	36	17	41	1/8 finals		
1964	2nd (Class A Second Group)	8 (Group 2)	26	7	12	7	19	16	26	1/32 finals		Qualified for Relegation group
1964	2nd (Class A Second Group)	17	38	11	17	10	35	25	39			Relegation group
1965	2nd (Class A Second Group)	14 (Group 1)	30	8	9	13	28	37	25	1/32 finals		Qualified for Relegation group
1965	2nd (Class A Second Group)	28	46	11	15	20	44	60	37			Relegation group
1966	2nd (Class A Second Group)	7 (Group 2)	34	12	12	10	35	28	36	1/32 finals		
1967	2nd (Class A Second Group)	2 (Group 2)	38	18	14	6	50	24	50	1/128 finals		Qualified for play-off for teams placed 2nd
1967	2nd (Class A Second Group)	4	4	2	1	1	6	5	5			Won the group for the 2nd placed teams
1968	2nd (Class A Second Group)	9 (Group 2)	40	14	15	11	52	42	43	1/64 finals		
1969	2nd (Class A Second Group)	7 (Group 3)	42	15	14	13	49	35	44	1/32 finals		Relegated
1970	3rd (Class A Second Group)	1 (Zone 1)	42	26	10	6	73	33	62	1/64 finals		Promoted, Champion of Ukraine
1971	2nd (First League)	4	42	16	14	12	51	39	46	1/16 finals		
1972	2nd (First League)	14	38	13	7	18	45	49	33	1/8 finals		
1973	2nd (First League)	6	38	14	6	18	62	53	34	1/16 finals		5 other draws included as losses
1974	2nd (First League)	13	38	11	12	15	42	50	34	1/16 finals		
1975	2nd (First League)	13	38	11	13	14	47	45	35	1/16 finals		
1976	2nd (First League)	13	38	14	8	16	38	40	36	1/16 finals		
1977	2nd (First League)	16	38	11	11	16	35	48	33	1/16 finals		
1978	2nd (First League)	14	38	10	14	14	39	47	34	1/32 finals		
1979	2nd (First League)	10	46	19	8	19	69	65	46			
1980	2nd (First League)	20	46	15	11	20	57	67	41			
1981	2nd (First League)	13	42	16	14	16	57	51	44			-2 pts draw overlimit
1982	2nd (First League)	12	42	17	7	18	54	42	41			
1983	2nd (First League)	5	42	21	8	13	66	46	50	1/32 finals		
1984	2nd (First League)	5	42	18	12	12	57	43	48	1/16 finals		
1985	2nd (First League)	7 (West Zone)	20	7	5	8	17	25	19	1/64 finals		Qualified for Group B
1985	2nd (First League)	13	18	9	3	6	32	27	21			Group B (13–22 places)
1986	2nd (First League)	12	46	17	11	18	59	54	45	1/16 finals		
1987	2nd (First League)	9	42	14	12	16	54	53	40	1/8 finals		
1988	2nd (First League)	17	42	12	13	17	30	43	36	1/32 finals		-1 point, draw overlimit
1989	2nd (First League)	7	42	17	12	13	55	40	46	1/64 finals		
1990	2nd (First League)	3	38	19	14	5	58	30	52	1/16 finals		Promoted
1991	1st (Top League)	13	30	9	7	14	27	38	25	1/64 finals		
1992	league competition discontinued									1/16 finals		

=== Ukraine ===
Season	Div.	Pos.	Pl.	W	D	L	GS	GA	P	Ukrainian Cup	Europe		Notes
1992	1st (Top League)	11	18	6	6	6	20	19	18	1/4 finals			
1992–93	1st (Top League)	7	30	10	9	11	38	35	29	1/4 finals			
1993–94	1st (Top League)	16	34	9	6	19	26	49	24	1/8 finals			
1994–95	1st (Top League)	9	34	11	10	13	47	42	43	1/8 finals			
1995–96	1st (Top League)	5	34	16	4	14	49	42	52	1/4 finals			
1996–97	1st (Top League)	8	30	12	5	13	48	44	41	1/2 finals			
1997–98	1st (Top League)	9	30	10	7	13	40	44	37	1/16 finals			
1998–99	1st (Top League)	8	30	12	6	12	46	43	42	1/2 finals			
1999–00	1st (Top League)	6	30	12	8	10	43	35	44	1/8 finals			
2000–01	1st (Top League)	8	26	8	8	10	27	31	32	1/8 finals			
2001–02	1st (Top League)	4	26	11	7	8	25	22	40	1/8 finals			
2002–03	1st (Top League)	15	30	6	8	16	22	41	26	1/16 finals	UC	1st round	
2003–04	1st (Top League)	11	30	8	8	14	26	40	32	1/4 finals			
2004–05	1st (Top League)	10	30	8	11	11	25	32	35	1/8 finals			
2005–06	1st (Top League)	8	30	11	6	13	32	40	39	Runner-up			
2006–07	1st (Top League)	7	30	10	10	10	25	32	40	1/16 finals	UC	1st round	
2007–08	1st (Top League)	7	30	9	9	12	24	32	36	1/16 finals			
2008–09	1st (Premier League)	7	30	12	9	9	29	30	45	1/16 finals			
2009–10	1st (Premier League)	9	30	10	5	15	31	48	35	1/4 finals			
2010–11	1st (Premier League)	16	30	6	6	18	18	40	24	1/4 finals			Relegated
2011–12	2nd (First League)	2	34	24	4	6	77	32	76	1/4 finals			Promoted
2012–13	1st (Premier League)	16	30	1	8	21	12	64	11	1/16 finals			
2013–14	1st (Premier League)	14	28	2	6	20	19	54	12	1/8 finals			
2014–15	1st (Premier League)	7	26	6	8	12	20	40	26	1/8 finals			
2015–16	1st (Premier League)	14	26	0	3	23	7	50	3	1/16 finals			Expelled

==== FC Metallurh based on FC Rosso Nero ====
Season	Div.	Pos.	Pl.	W	D	L	GS	GA	P	Ukrainian Cup	Europe	Notes
2016	4th (Amateur League)	3	6	2	2	2	5	6	8			Admitted
2016–17	3rd	16	32	7	2	23	35	104	23	1/64 finals		
2017–18	3rd "B"	12	33	2	1	30	14	133	7	1/64 finals		Dissolved

==== MFC Metalurh Zaporizhzhia ====
Season	Div.	Pos.	Pl.	W	D	L	GS	GA	P	Ukrainian Cup	Europe		Notes
2017–18	4th "C"	4	16	9	4	3	39	18	31	1/4 finals (amateurs)			Admitted
2018–19	3rd (Second League)	2	27	18	2	7	54	24	56	1/32 finals			Promoted to Ukrainian First League
2019–20	2nd (First League)	15	30	6	4	20	28	58	22	1/32 finals			Lost Relegation play-offs: FC Alians Lypova Dolyna 0:2 0:1 (0-3); Relegated to Second League
2020–21	3rd (Second League)	3	22	13	4	5	42	20	43	1/32 finals			
2021–22	3rd (Second League)	1	19	13	6	0	34	7	45	1/32 finals			Promoted to Ukrainian First League
2022–23	2nd( First League "B")	4_{/8}	14	5	5	4	17	16	20	no competition	-	-	to Promotion group
2022–23	2nd( First League "B")	4_{/8}	14	6	3	5	18	16	21	no competition	-	-	
2023–24	2nd( First League "B")	6_{/8}	18	6	7	5	23	18	25	1/64 finals	-	-	to Relegation group
2023–24	2nd( First League "B")	17_{/20}	28	7	7	14	27	48	28	1/64 finals	-	-	-
2024–25	2nd( First League "B")	7_{/9}	16	4	5	7	15	22	17	1/64 finals	-	-	to Relegation group
2024–25	2nd( First League "B")	14_{/17}	24	6	8	10	24	35	26	1/64 finals	-	-	-
2025–26	2nd(First League)	16_{/16}	30	4	7	19	16	61	19	1/16 finals	-	-	Relegated to Ukrainian Second League
2026–27	3rd (Second League "B")	6_{/9}	12	4	3	5	12	15	15	1/32 finals	-	-	TBD

== European record ==
FC Metalurh Zaporizhzhia competed in two seasons of European competitions. On August 15, 2002, it played its first game against Birkirkara F.C. during the 2002–03 UEFA Cup. Metalurh hosted the Maltese side at Meteor Stadium in Dnipropetrovsk due to the reconstruction of Slavutych Arena. In 2001, the Football Federation of Ukraine condemned the Central Stadium "Metalurh" as unusable, and the stadium was completely demolished in the spring of 2002. The first goal in European competitions was scored by Armen Akopyan, who at the time was also a player of the Ukraine national under-21 football team.

Season	Competition	Round	Club	Home	Away	Aggregate
2002–03	UEFA Cup	QR	(Malta) Birkirkara F.C.	3–0	0–0	3–0
2002–03	UEFA Cup	1R	(England) Leeds United	1–1	0–1	1–2
2006–07	UEFA Cup	2Q	(Moldova) Zimbru Chișinău	3–0	0–0	3–0
2006–07	UEFA Cup	1R	(Greece) Panathinaikos F.C.	0–1	1–1	1–2

== Officials ==
- 1957 – 1959 Aleksandr Timofeev (nachalnik komandy)
- 1971 Viktor Zhylin (nachalnik komandy)
- 1972 Petro Stupakov (nachalnik komandy)
- 1973 – 1974 Nikolay Farafonov (nachalnik komandy)
- 1974 – 1977 Hryhoriy Vul (nachalnik komandy)
- 1978 – 1980 Viktor Beloblotskyi (nachalnik komandy)
- 1978 Viktor Malakhovskyi (administrator)
- 1980 – 1981 Yuriy Sevastianenko (nachalnik komandy)
- 1981 – 1991 Viktor Mezheiko (nachalnik komandy)
- 1981 – 1982 Anatoliy Semykopenko (administrator)
- 1989 – 1991 Hennadiy Zhyzdik (president)
- 1991 – 2006 Viktor Mezheiko (president)
- 1993 – 1994 Hryhoriy Vul (nachalnik komandy)
- 1994 – 1997 Oleksandr Tomakh (general director)
- 1998 – 2001 Oleksandr Tomakh (technical director)
- 2002 – 2006 Andriy Kurhanskyi (vice-president)
- 2006 – 2012 Andriy Kurhanskyi (president)
- 2012 – 2015 Andriy Shevchuk (president)
- 2013 – 2015 Oleksandr Tomakh (sports director)
- 2014 – 2017 Mike Snoei (sports/technical director)
- 2016 – 2018 Andriy Bohatchenko (president/Rosso Nero)

== Managers ==
- (Soviet Union) Viktor Zhylin (1972)
- (Soviet Union) Yozhef Betsa (1976–78)
- (Soviet Union) Oleksandr Tomakh (1981–88)
- (Soviet Union) Ihor Nadein (1988–92)
- (Ukraine) Anatoliy Kuksov (1994)
- (Ukraine) Oleksandr Tomakh (1994–98)
- (Ukraine) Myron Markevych (3 March 1999 – 15 May 2001)
- (Ukraine) Volodymyr Atamanyuk (2001–02)
- (Ukraine) Oleh Taran (1 Aug 2001 – Sept 12, 2002)
- (Ukraine) Oleh Lutkov (interim) (Sept 12, 2002 – 1 Nov 2002)
- (Ukraine) Ihor Nadein (2002)
- (Croatia) Ivan Katalinić (2003)
- (Ukraine) Mykhaylo Fomenko (1 July 2003 – 31 Dec 2003)
- (Belarus) Anatoliy Yurevich (1 Jan 2004 – 30 April 2004)
- (Belarus) Sergei Borovsky (1 May 2004 – 30 June 2004)
- (Ukraine) Valeriy Yaremchenko (1 July 2004 – 25 July 2005)
- (Ukraine) Anatoliy Chantsev (interim) (28 July 2005 – Sept 19, 2005)
- (Ukraine) Vyacheslav Hroznyi (Sept 20, 2005 – 30 June 2006)
- (Ukraine) Serhiy Yashchenko (1 July 2006 – 16 April 2007)
- (Ukraine) Anatoliy Chantsev (16 April 2007 – 3 Dec 2008)
- (Ukraine) Oleh Lutkov (3 Dec 2008 – Sept 3, 2009)
- (Russia) Vladimir Khodus (Sept 3, 2009 – 22 Oct 2009)
- (Ukraine) Roman Hryhorchuk (22 Oct 2009 – 10 Nov 2009)
- (Russia) Vladimir Khodus (interim) (10 Nov 2009 – 8 Dec 2009)
- (Ukraine) Roman Hryhorchuk (2009–10)
- (Ukraine) Oleh Lutkov (3 June 2010 – 3 May 2011)
- (Ukraine) Hryhoriy Nehiryev (interim) (4 May 2011 – 1 June 2011)
- (Ukraine) Serhiy Zaytsev (1 June 2011 – 1 June 2012)
- (Ukraine) Anatoliy Buznyk (15 June 2012 – 13 July 2012)
- (Ukraine) Ihor Luchkevych (interim) (14 July 2012 – 23 July 2012)
- (Ukraine) Serhiy Kovalets (24 July 2012 – Sept 1, 2012)
- (Ukraine) Anatoliy Zayaev (interim) (Sept 1, 2012 – Sept 6, 2012)
- (Ukraine) Vitaliy Kvartsyanyi (Sept 8, 2012 – 31 Dec 2012)
- (Ukraine) Serhiy Zaytsev (1 Jan 2013 – 29 June 2013)
- (Ukraine) Serhiy Puchkov (10 June 2013 – 28 Oct 2013)
- (Ukraine) Oleh Taran (28 Oct 2013 – 7 Nov 2014)
- (Ukraine) Oleksandr Tomakh (interim) (7 Nov 2014 – 24 Feb 2015)
- (Ukraine) Anatoliy Chantsev (24 Feb 2015 – 4 Dec 2015)

FC Metallurh based on FC Rosso Nero

- (Ukraine) Vasyl Storchak (2013 – 2016)
- (Ukraine) Illya Blyznyuk (27 Jul 2016 – Dec 2016)
- (Ukraine) Viktor Zhuk (interim) (10 Jan 2017 – 7 June 2018)

MFC Metalurh Zaporizhzhia

- (Ukraine) Volodymyr Shapovalov (6 August 2017 – 7 June 2018)
- (Ukraine) Oleh Taran (7 June 2018 – 2019)
- (Ukraine) Ivan Bohatyr (2019)
- (Ukraine) Oleksiy Hodin (interim) (2019 – 2020)
- (Ukraine) Volodymyr Mykytin (27 August 2020 – )

== See also ==
- FC Metalurh-2 Zaporizhzhia
- FC Metalurh Zaporizhzhia Reserves and Youth Team
