= 2012–13 FC Dnipro Dnipropetrovsk season =

Dnipro
2012–13 season
- Chairman: Andriy Stetsenkov
- Manager: Juande Ramos
- Stadium: Dnipro Arena
- Premier League: 4th
- Ukrainian Cup: Semi-final vs Chornomorets Odesa
- Europa League: Round of 32 vs Basel
- Top goalscorer: League: Giuliano (9); All: Matheus (12)
- Highest home attendance: 31,003 vs PSV Eindhoven; 28 September 2012
- Lowest home attendance: 7,651 vs Illichivets Mariupol; 31 October 2012
- Average home league attendance: 19,013
| Home colours | Away colours |

The Dnipro 2012–13 season was Dnipro's twenty-second Ukrainian Premier League season, and their third season under manager Juande Ramos. They finished the season in fourth place, while also reaching the semifinal of the Ukrainian Cup and the Last 32 of the UEFA Europa League when they were eliminated by Basel.

== Current squad ==
According to the club's official website on February 9, 2013. Note: Flags indicate national team as defined under FIFA eligibility rules; some limited exceptions apply. Players may hold more than one non-FIFA nationality.

| No. | Pos. | Nation | Player |
|---|---|---|---|
| 3 | DF | CZE | Ondřej Mazuch |
| 4 | MF | UKR | Serhiy Kravchenko |
| 5 | DF | UKR | Vitaliy Mandzyuk |
| 6 | MF | GEO | Jaba Kankava |
| 7 | MF | UKR | Denys Kulakov |
| 8 | MF | BRA | Giuliano |
| 9 | FW | CRO | Nikola Kalinić |
| 10 | MF | UKR | Yevhen Konoplyanka |
| 11 | MF | UKR | Denys Oliynyk |
| 14 | DF | UKR | Yevhen Cheberyachko |
| 16 | GK | CZE | Jan Laštůvka |
| 17 | DF | CRO | Ivan Strinić |
| 18 | FW | UKR | Roman Zozulya |

| No. | Pos. | Nation | Player |
|---|---|---|---|
| 19 | MF | GEO | Alexander Kobakhidze |
| 20 | MF | GHA | Derek Boateng |
| 21 | FW | UKR | Yevhen Seleznyov |
| 23 | DF | BRA | Douglas |
| 24 | DF | CMR | Éric Matoukou |
| 28 | MF | UKR | Yevhen Shakhov |
| 29 | MF | UKR | Ruslan Rotan (captain) |
| 36 | MF | UKR | Ruslan Babenko |
| 44 | DF | UKR | Artem Fedetskiy |
| 77 | GK | UKR | Denys Shelikhov |
| 91 | GK | UKR | Ihor Vartsaba |
| 97 | MF | UKR | Andriy Blyznychenko |
| 99 | FW | BRA | Matheus |

=== Out on loan ===
Note: Flags indicate national team as defined under FIFA eligibility rules; some limited exceptions apply. Players may hold more than one non-FIFA nationality.

| No. | Pos. | Nation | Player |
|---|---|---|---|
| — | GK | UKR | Stanislav Chyhryn (at Kryvbas Kryvyi Rih) |
| — | DF | GHA | Samuel Inkoom (on loan to (France) Bastia) |
| — | DF | GEO | Ucha Lobjanidze (at Kryvbas Kryvyi Rih) |
| — | MF | CRO | Mladen Bartulović (at Kryvbas Kryvyi Rih) |
| — | MF | UKR | Valeriy Fedorchuk (at Kryvbas Kryvyi Rih) |

| No. | Pos. | Nation | Player |
|---|---|---|---|
| — | MF | UKR | Artem Filimonov (at Kryvbas Kryvyi Rih) |
| — | MF | UKR | Oleksiy Razuvayev (at Naftovyk-Ukrnafta Okhtyrka) |
| — | FW | UKR | Oleksiy Antonov (at Kryvbas Kryvyi Rih) |
| — | FW | UKR | Oleksandr Hladkyi (at Karpaty Lviv) |

== Transfers ==
=== Summer ===
In: Note: Flags indicate national team as defined under FIFA eligibility rules; some limited exceptions apply. Players may hold more than one non-FIFA nationality.

| No. | Pos. | Nation | Player |
|---|---|---|---|
| 21 | FW | UKR | Yevhen Seleznyov (on loan from (Ukraine) Shakhtar Donetsk) |
| 23 | DF | NGR | Michael Odibe (on loan from (Ukraine) Arsenal Kyiv) |
| 88 | FW | UKR | Oleksandr Aliyev (on loan from (Ukraine) Dynamo Kyiv) |

Out: Note: Flags indicate national team as defined under FIFA eligibility rules; some limited exceptions apply. Players may hold more than one non-FIFA nationality.

| No. | Pos. | Nation | Player |
|---|---|---|---|
| 22 | FW | UKR | Oleksandr Gladkiy (to Karpaty Lviv) |
| 32 | GK | UKR | Anton Kanibolotskiy (to Shakhtar Donetsk) |
| 56 | FW | SVK | Götor Sokovic |

=== Winter ===
In: Note: Flags indicate national team as defined under FIFA eligibility rules; some limited exceptions apply. Players may hold more than one non-FIFA nationality.

| No. | Pos. | Nation | Player |
|---|---|---|---|
| 19 | MF | GEO | Aleksandre Kobakhidze (loan return from (Ukraine) Arsenal Kyiv) |
| 23 | DF | BRA | Douglas (from (Brazil) Vasco da Gama) |
| 24 | DF | CMR | Éric Matoukou (loan return from (Ukraine) Arsenal Kyiv) |
| 28 | MF | UKR | Yevhen Shakhov (loan return from (Ukraine) Arsenal Kyiv) |

Out: Note: Flags indicate national team as defined under FIFA eligibility rules; some limited exceptions apply. Players may hold more than one non-FIFA nationality.

| No. | Pos. | Nation | Player |
|---|---|---|---|
| 2 | DF | GHA | Samuel Inkoom (loan to (France) Bastia) |
| 19 | DF | UZB | Vitaliy Denisov (to (Russia) Lokomotiv Moscow) |
| 21 | FW | UKR | Yevhen Seleznyov (loan return to (Ukraine) Shakhtar Donetsk) |
| 23 | DF | NGR | Michael Odibe (loan return to (Ukraine) Arsenal Kyiv) |
| 88 | FW | UKR | Oleksandr Aliyev (loan return to (Ukraine) Dynamo Kyiv) |

== Competitions ==
=== Ukrainian Premier League ===
==== Results summary ====
| Overall | | | | | | | | Home | | | | | | Away | | | | | |
| Pld | W | D | L | GF | GA | GD | Pts | W | D | L | GF | GA | GD | W | D | L | GF | GA | GD |
|---|---|---|---|---|---|---|---|---|---|---|---|---|---|---|---|---|---|---|---|
| 30 | 16 | 8 | 6 | 56 | 27 | +29 | 56 | 11 | 2 | 2 | 35 | 10 | +25 | 5 | 6 | 4 | 21 | 17 | +4 |

Last updated: 27 May 2013.
Source: Soccerway

==== Results by round ====
| Round | 1 | 2 | 3 | 4 | 5 | 6 | 7 | 8 | 9 | 10 | 11 | 12 | 13 | 14 | 15 | 16 | 17 | 18 | 19 | 20 | 21 | 22 | 23 | 24 | 25 | 26 | 27 | 28 | 29 | 30 |
|---|---|---|---|---|---|---|---|---|---|---|---|---|---|---|---|---|---|---|---|---|---|---|---|---|---|---|---|---|---|---|
| Ground | H | A | H | A | H | A | H | A | H | A | H | A | H | H | A | A | H | A | H | A | H | A | H | A | H | A | H | A | A | H |
| Result | W | W | W | D | W | D | W | D | W | L | W | L | W | W | D | W | W | D | W | W | L | D | L | W | D | L | D | W | L | W |
| Position | 2 | 2 | 2 | 3 | 3 | 3 | 3 | 2 | 2 | 3 | 2 | 2 | 2 | 2 | 2 | 2 | 2 | 2 | 2 | 2 | 3 | 4 | 4 | 4 | 4 | 4 | 4 | 4 | 4 | 4 |

Updated to match(es) played on 27 May 2013. Source: Soccerway
A = Away; H = Home; W = Win; D = Draw; L = Loss

==== Results ====
| 15 July 2012 1 | Dnipro | 3–1 | Tavriya | Dnipropetrovsk |
| 19:30 EEST (UTC+3) | Giuliano 2', 57'; Konoplyanka (yellow card) 20' (yellow-red card) 30'; Dzyanisaw 73' | Summary | Feschuk 87' | Stadium: Dnipro Arena; Attendance: 19,111; Referee: Sergiy Boyko |

| 22 July 2012 2 | Metalurh Zaporizhya | 0–4 | Dnipro | Zaporizhya |
| 18:00 EEST (UTC+3) | Sydorchuk (red card) 43' | Summary | Zozulya 5'; Giuliano 62'; Aliyev 77'; Matheus 90+2' | Stadium: Slavutych-Arena; Attendance: 11,500; Referee: Anatoliy Abdula |

| 29 July 2012 3 | Dnipro | 2–0 | Metalurh Donetsk | Dnipropetrovsk |
| 19:30 EEST (UTC+3) | Konoplyanka 4', 27' | Summary | | Stadium: Dnipro Arena; Attendance: 20,312; Referee: Kostyantin Trukhanov |

| 5 August 2012 4 | Arsenal Kyiv | 1–1 | Dnipro | Kyiv |
| 19:30 EEST (UTC+3) | Kobakhidze 90+2' | Summary | Matheus 65' (pen.) | Stadium: Valeriy Lobanovskyi; Attendance: 3,920; Referee: Yaroslav Kozyk |

| 11 August 2012 5 | Dnipro | 4–1 | Hoverla Uzhhorod | Dnipropetrovsk |
| 19:30 EEST (UTC+3) | Zozulya 12', 90+3'; Rotan 73'; Giuliano 87' | Summary | Melikyan 54'; Shchedrakov (yellow card) 63' (yellow-red card) 90+2' | Stadium: Dnipro Arena; Attendance: 15,626; Referee: Dmitro Kutakov |

| 18 August 2012 6 | Kryvbas | 0–0 | Dnipro | Kryvyi Rih |
| 17:30 EEST (UTC+3) | | Summary | Mazuch (yellow card) 18' (yellow-red card) 88' | Stadium: Metalurh Stadium; Attendance: 4,925; Referee: Evgen Aranovskiy |

| 24 August 2012 7 | Dnipro | 2–1 | Volyn | Dnipropetrovsk |
| 17:30 EEST (UTC+3) | Kalinić 23'; Aliyev 47' | Summary | Subotic 20' | Stadium: Dnipro Arena; Attendance: 14,436 |

| 31 August 2012 8 | Vorskla | 2–2 | Dnipro | Poltava |
| 16:00 EEST (UTC+3) | Selin 79'; Januzi 82' | Summary | Oliynyk 19'; Giuliano 53' | Stadium: Butovsky Vorskla Stadium; Attendance: 8,000; Referee: Anatoliy Zhabchenko |

| 15 September 2012 9 | Dnipro | 1–0 | Chornomorets | Dnipropetrovsk |
| 17:30 EEST (UTC+3) | Seleznyov 15' | Summary | | Stadium: Dnipro Arena; Attendance: 15,078; Referee: Oleksandr Ivanov |

| 28 September 2012 10 | Shakhtar | 2–1 | Dnipro | Donetsk |
| 19:30 EEST (UTC+3) | Mkhitaryan 19'; Srna 80'; Stepanenko (yellow card) 38' (yellow-red card) 89' | Summary | Rotan 9'; Cheberyachko (yellow card) 46' (yellow-red card) 60' | Stadium: Donbas Arena; Attendance: 47,487; Referee: Serhiy Boiko |

| 7 October 2012 11 | Dnipro | 2–1 | Dynamo Kyiv | Dnipropetrovsk |
| 17:30 EEST (UTC+3) | Seleznyov 12'; Matheus 83' | Summary | Veloso 90+4' | Stadium: Dnipro Arena; Attendance: 30,093; Referee: Yuriy Moseychuk |

| 20 October 2012 12 | Zorya Luhansk | 3–2 | Dnipro | Luhansk |
| 17:00 EEST (UTC+3) | Danilo 26'; Hrytsay 50'; Idahor 64' | Summary | Kalinić 43', 90+4' | Stadium: Avanhard Stadium; Attendance: 15,000; Referee: Sergiy Dankovskyi |

| 28 October 2012 13 | Dnipro | 2–0 | Karpaty Lviv | Dnipropetrovsk |
| 15:30 EEST (UTC+3) | Seleznyov 30' (pen.); Odibe 45+3' | Summary | | Stadium: Dnipro Arena; Attendance: 12,640; Referee: Yaroslav Kozyk |

| 3 November 2012 14 | Dnipro | 2–0 | Metalist Kharkiv | Dnipropetrovsk |
| 19:30 EET (UTC+2) | Rotan 51'; Giuliano 67' | Summary | Villagra (yellow card) 32' (yellow-red card) 90+8' | Stadium: Dnipro Arena; Attendance: 28,219; Referee: Anatoliy Zhabchenko |

| 11 November 2012 15 | Illichivets Mariupol | 0–0 | Dnipro | Mariupol |
| 14:00 EET (UTC+2) | | Summary | Fedetskiy (yellow card) 23' (yellow-red card) 42' | Stadium: Illichivets Stadium; Attendance: 8,300; Referee: Yuriy Moseychuk |

| 18 November 2012 16 | Tavriya Simferopol | 1–2 | Dnipro | Simferopol |
| 13:30 EET (UTC+2) | Feschuk 61' | Summary | Kalinić 74'; Giuliano 80' | Stadium: RSC Lokomotiv; Attendance: 6,200; Referee: Anatoliy Abdula |

| 26 November 2012 17 | Dnipro | 3–0 | Metalurh Zaporizhya | Dnipropetrovsk |
| 21:00 EET (UTC+2) | Kravchenko 21', 30'; Kalinić 72' | Summary | | Stadium: Dnipro Arena; Attendance: 8,180; Referee: Andriy Kuzmin |

| 1 December 2012 18 | Metalurh Donetsk | 0–0 | Dnipro | Donetsk |
| 16:00 EET (UTC+2) | | Summary | | Stadium: Metalurh Stadium; Attendance: 2,700; Referee: Evgen Aranovskiy |

| 2 March 2013 19 | Dnipro | 3–0 | Arsenal Kyiv | Dnipropetrovsk |
| 17:30 EET (UTC+2) | Zozulya 19'; Matheus 50' (pen.); Fedetskiy 68' | Summary | | Stadium: Dnipro Arena; Attendance: 12,801; Referee: Oleksandr Ivanov |

| 10 March 2013 20 | Hoverla Uzhhorod | 0–1 | Dnipro | Uzhhorod |
| 13:30 EET (UTC+2) | | Summary | Petrov 68' (o.g.) | Stadium: Avanhard Stadium; Attendance: 4,150; Referee: Dmitriy Kutakov |

| 17 March 2013 21 | Dnipro | 1–2 | Kryvbas | Dnipropetrovsk |
| 19:30 EET (UTC+2) | Kankava 33'; Zozulya (yellow card) 10' (yellow-red card) 58' | Summary | Antonov 47'; Dedechko 80' | Stadium: Dnipro Arena; Attendance: 11,493; Referee: Evgen Aranovskiy |

| 31 March 2013 22 | Volyn Lutsk | 1–1 | Dnipro | Lutsk |
| 17:30 EEST (UTC+3) | Bicfalvi 22' (pen.); Izvoranu (yellow card) 21' (yellow-red card) 60'; Šikov (red card) 70' | Summary | Douglas (red card) 21'; Giuliano 45+2' | Stadium: Avanhard Stadium; Attendance: 3,800; Referee: Sergiy Boyko |

| 6 April 2013 23 | Dnipro | 1–2 | Vorskla Poltava | Dnipropetrovsk |
| 17:30 EEST (UTC+3) | Giuliano 90+1' | Summary | Mazuch 20' (o.g.); Hromov 83' | Stadium: Dnipro Arena; Attendance: 14,447; Referee: Yaroslav Kozyk |

| 12 April 2013 24 | Chornomorets Odesa | 1–2 | Dnipro | Odesa |
| 19:15 EEST (UTC+3) | Dja Djédjé 37' | Summary | Matheus 53'; Zozulya 79' | Stadium: Chornomorets Stadium; Attendance: 27,163; Referee: Andriy Kuzmin |

| 21 April 2013 25 | Dnipro | 1–1 | Shakhtar Donetsk | Dnipropetrovsk |
| 19:30 EEST (UTC+3) | Matheus 13' | Summary | Srna 62' (pen.) | Stadium: Dnipro Arena; Attendance: 30,530; Referee: Yuri Mozharovskiy |

| 27 April 2013 26 | Dynamo Kyiv | 2–0 | Dnipro | Kyiv |
| 19:30 EEST (UTC+3) | Haruna 9', 45+1' | Summary | Mandzyuk (yellow card) 16' (yellow-red card) 75' | Stadium: Olimpiysky National Sports Complex; Attendance: 55,219; Referee: Anatoliy Zhabchenko |

| 3 May 2013 27 | Dnipro | 1–1 | Zorya Luhansk | Dnipropetrovsk |
| 18:00 EEST (UTC+3) | Seleznyov 60' | Summary | Danilo 28' | Stadium: Dnipro Arena; Attendance: 10,020; Referee: Yury Vaks |

| 12 May 2013 28 | Karpaty Lviv | 2–4 | Dnipro | Lviv |
| 19:30 EEST (UTC+3) | Douglas 79'; Milošević 89' | Summary | Kravchenko 16'; Seleznyov 18'; Kalinić 28'; Kobakhidze 90+2' | Stadium: Arena Lviv; Referee: Olenader Derdo |

| 19 May 2013 29 | Metalist Kharkiv | 2–1 | Dnipro | Kharkiv |
| 18:30 EEST (UTC+3) | Dević 9', 67' | Summary | Seleznyov 2' | Stadium: Metalist Stadium; Attendance: 33,754; Referee: Yuri Mozharovskiy |

| 26 May 2013 30 | Dnipro | 7–0 | Illichivets Mariupol | Dnipropetrovsk |
| 16:00 EEST (UTC+3) | Zozulya 5', 35', 45'; Seleznyov 24' (pen.); Rotan 72'; Shakhov 87'; Oliynyk 90+1' | Summary | | Stadium: Dnipro Arena; Attendance: 10,537; Referee: Ivan Bondar |

==== League table ====
| Pos | Team | Pld | W | D | L | GF | GA | GD | Pts | Qualification or relegation |
|---|---|---|---|---|---|---|---|---|---|---|
| 2 | Metalist Kharkiv | 30 | 20 | 6 | 4 | 59 | 25 | +34 | 66 | Qualification for the Champions League third qualifying round |
| 3 | Dynamo Kyiv | 30 | 20 | 2 | 8 | 55 | 23 | +32 | 62 | Qualification for the Europa League play-off round |
| 4 | Dnipro Dnipropetrovsk | 30 | 16 | 8 | 6 | 54 | 27 | +27 | 56 | Qualification for the Europa League play-off round |
| 5 | Metalurh Donetsk | 30 | 14 | 7 | 9 | 45 | 35 | +10 | 49 | Qualification for the Europa League third qualifying round |
| 6 | Chornomorets Odesa | 30 | 12 | 7 | 11 | 32 | 36 | −4 | 43 | Qualification for the Europa League second qualifying round |

Source: uafootball.net.ua
Rules for classification: 1st points; 2nd goal difference; 3rd goals scored; 4th head-to-head points; 5th head-to-head goal difference; 6th head-to-head goals scored; 7th fair play; 8th draw (Regulation, p.52-53).

=== Ukrainian Cup ===
| 23 September 2012 Round of 32 | Zhemchuzhyna Yalta | 0–1 | Dnipro | Avanhard Stadion, Yalta |
| 16:00 EEST (UTC+3) | | Summary | Kalinić 15' | Attendance: 3,700; Referee: Sergiy Skyrda |

| 31 October 2012 Round of 16 | Dnipro | 2–0 | Illichivets Mariupol | Dnipropetrovsk |
| 18:30 EET (UTC+2) | Matheus 50'; Giuliano 75' | Summary | | Stadium: Dnipro Arena; Attendance: 7,651; Referee: Yuriy Morzharovskyi |

| 17 April 2013 Quarterfinal | Volyn Lutsk | 0–2 | Dnipro | Lutsk |
| 17:30 EEST (UTC+3) | | Summary | Kravchenko 45+3'; Matheus 90+4' | Stadium: Avanhard Stadium; Attendance: 3,800; Referee: Kostyantyn Trokhanov |

| 8 May 2013 Semifinal | Chornomorets Odesa | 2–1 | Dnipro Dnipropetrovsk | Odesa |
| 20:30 EEST (UTC+3) | Fontanello 62'; Léo Matos 68' | Summary | Matheus 8' | Stadium: Chornomorets Stadium; Attendance: 25,123; Referee: Anatoliy Abdula |

=== UEFA Europa League ===
==== Play-off ====
| 23 August 2012 Play-off Round; 1st Leg | Slovan Liberec (Czech Republic) | 2–2 | (Ukraine) Dnipro | Liberec |
| 20:00 (UTC+3) | Breznaník 62'; Vácha 90' (pen.) | Report; Summary | Konoplyanka 43'; Matheus 49' | Stadium: Stadion u Nisy; Attendance: 4,226; Referee: (Netherlands) Pol van Boekel |

| 30 August 2012 Play-off Round; 2nd Leg | Dnipro (Ukraine) | 4–2 (6–4 agg.) | (Czech Republic) Slovan Liberec | Dnipropetrovsk |
| 19:00 (UTC+3) | Aliyev 12' (pen.), 59' (pen.); Konoplyanka 76'; Kalinić 87' | Report; Summary | Nezmar (yellow card) 12' (yellow-red card) 25'; Breznaník 61'; Kelić 72' | Stadium: Dnipro Arena; Attendance: 27,076; Referee: (Portugal) Duarte Gomes |

==== Group stage ====
| Pos | Team | Pld | W | D | L | GF | GA | GD | Pts | Qualification | DNI | NAP | PSV | AIK |
|---|---|---|---|---|---|---|---|---|---|---|---|---|---|---|
| 1 | (Ukraine) Dnipro Dnipropetrovsk | 6 | 5 | 0 | 1 | 16 | 8 | +8 | 15 | Advance to knockout phase | — | 3–1 | 2–0 | 4–0 |
| 2 | (Italy) Napoli | 6 | 3 | 0 | 3 | 12 | 12 | 0 | 9 | Advance to knockout phase | 4–2 | — | 1–3 | 4–0 |
| 3 | (Netherlands) PSV Eindhoven | 6 | 2 | 1 | 3 | 8 | 7 | +1 | 7 | | 1–2 | 3–0 | — | 1–1 |
| 4 | (Sweden) AIK | 6 | 1 | 1 | 4 | 5 | 14 | −9 | 4 | | 2–3 | 1–2 | 1–0 | — |

Source: Soccerway

| 28 September 2012 1 | Dnipro (Ukraine) | 2–0 | (Netherlands) PSV | Dnipropetrovsk |
| 20:00 EEST (UTC+3) | Matheus 50'; Hutchinson 58' (o.g.) | Report | | Stadium: Dnipro Arena; Attendance: 31,003; Referee: (Czech Republic) Miroslav Zelinka |

| 4 October 2012 2 | AIK (Sweden) | 2–3 | (Ukraine) Dnipro | Stockholm |
| 21:05 EEST (UTC+3) | Daníelsson 5'; Goitom 45+1' | Report | Kalinić 41'; Mandzyuk 74'; Seleznyov 83' | Stadium: Råsunda Stadium; Attendance: 10,091; Referee: Ivan Kružliak (Slovakia) |

| 25 October 2012 3 | Dnipro (Ukraine) | 3–1 | (Italy) Napoli | Dnipropetrovsk |
| 22:05 EEST (UTC+3) | Fedetskiy 2'; Matheus 42'; Giuliano 64' | Report | Cavani 75' (pen.) | Stadium: Dnipro Arena; Attendance: 29,000; Referee: Hüseyin Göçek (Turkey) |

| 8 November 2012 4 | Napoli (Italy) | 4–2 | (Ukraine) Dnipro | Naples |
| 20:00 EET (UTC+2) | Cavani 5', 77', 88', 90' | Report | Fedetskiy 33'; Zozulya 52' | Stadium: Stadio San Paolo; Attendance: 25,000; Referee: Alon Yefet (Israel) |

| 22 November 2012 5 | PSV Eindhoven (Netherlands) | 1–2 | (Ukraine) Dnipro | Eindhoven |
| 22:05 EET (UTC+2) | Wijnaldum 18' | Report | Seleznyov 24'; Konoplyanka 74'; Kankava (yellow card) 81' (yellow-red card) 84' | Stadium: Philips Stadion; Attendance: 25,000; Referee: Carlos Clos Gómez (Spain) |

| 6 December 2012 6 | Dnipro (Ukraine) | 4–0 | (Sweden) AIK | Dnipropetrovsk |
| 22:05 EET (UTC+2) | Kalinić 20' (pen.); Zozulya 39', 52'; Kravchenko 86' | Report | | Stadium: Dnipro Arena; Attendance: 25,000; Referee: Stephan Studer (Switzerland) |

==== Knockout phase ====
| 14 February 2013 Round of 32 First leg | Basel (Switzerland) | 2–0 | (Ukraine) Dnipro | Basel |
| 22:05 EET (UTC+2) | Stocker 23'; Streller 67' | Report | | Stadium: St. Jakob-Park; Attendance: 8,314; Referee: Svein Oddvar Moen (Norway) |

| 21 February 2013 Round of 32 Second leg | Dnipro (Ukraine) | 1–1 (1–3 agg.) | (Switzerland) Basel | Dnipropetrovsk |
| 20:00 EET (UTC+2) | Kalinić (red card) 63'; Seleznyov 76' (pen.) | Report | Frei (red card) 75'; Schär 81' (pen.) | Stadium: Dnipro Arena; Attendance: 26,000; Referee: Deniz Aytekin (Germany) |

== Squad statistics ==
As of 13 May 2013

=== Appearances and goals ===
| No. | Pos | Nat | Player | Total | | Premier League | | Ukrainian Cup | | Europa League | |
| No. | Pos | Nat | Player | Apps | Goals | Apps | Goals | Apps | Goals | Apps | Goals |
|---|---|---|---|---|---|---|---|---|---|---|---|
| 3 | DF | (Czech Republic) CZE | Ondřej Mazuch | 30 | 0 | 19+0 | 0 | 2+0 | 0 | 9+0 | 0 |
| 4 | MF | (Ukraine) UKR | Serhiy Kravchenko | 26 | 4 | 14+5 | 3 | 1+1 | 0 | 2+3 | 1 |
| 5 | DF | (Ukraine) UKR | Vitaliy Mandzyuk | 36 | 1 | 22+3 | 0 | 1+0 | 0 | 9+1 | 1 |
| 6 | MF | (Georgia (country)) GEO | Jaba Kankava | 23 | 0 | 9+7 | 0 | 2+0 | 0 | 2+3 | 0 |
| 7 | MF | (Ukraine) UKR | Denys Kulakov | 9 | 0 | 2+7 | 0 | 0+0 | 0 | 0+0 | 0 |
| 8 | MF | (Brazil) BRA | Giuliano | 39 | 11 | 27+0 | 9 | 2+0 | 1 | 9+1 | 1 |
| 9 | FW | (Croatia) CRO | Nikola Kalinić | 28 | 10 | 13+7 | 6 | 2+0 | 1 | 3+3 | 3 |
| 10 | MF | (Ukraine) UKR | Yevhen Konoplianka | 30 | 5 | 15+5 | 2 | 1+0 | 0 | 8+1 | 3 |
| 11 | MF | (Ukraine) UKR | Denys Oliynyk | 15 | 2 | 10+2 | 2 | 1+0 | 0 | 0+2 | 0 |
| 14 | DF | (Ukraine) UKR | Yevhen Cheberyachko | 37 | 0 | 25+1 | 0 | 2+0 | 0 | 9+0 | 0 |
| 16 | GK | (Czech Republic) CZE | Jan Laštůvka | 34 | 0 | 23+0 | 0 | 1+0 | 0 | 10+0 | 0 |
| 17 | DF | (Croatia) CRO | Ivan Strinić | 32 | 0 | 20+2 | 0 | 1+0 | 0 | 9+0 | 0 |
| 18 | FW | (Ukraine) UKR | Roman Zozulya | 31 | 10 | 16+6 | 8 | 0+0 | 0 | 8+1 | 2 |
| 19 | MF | (Georgia (country)) GEO | Alexander Kobakhidze | 4 | 1 | 1+3 | 1 | 0+0 | 0 | 0+0 | 0 |
| 21 | FW | (Ukraine) UKR | Yevhen Seleznyov | 29 | 10 | 14+8 | 7 | 0+1 | 0 | 5+1 | 3 |
| 23 | MF | (Brazil) BRA | Douglas | 8 | 0 | 7+0 | 0 | 0+0 | 0 | 1+0 | 0 |
| 28 | MF | (Ukraine) UKR | Yevhen Shakhov | 4 | 1 | 1+3 | 1 | 0+0 | 0 | 0+0 | 0 |
| 29 | MF | (Ukraine) UKR | Ruslan Rotan | 34 | 4 | 23+1 | 4 | 1+0 | 0 | 9+0 | 0 |
| 36 | MF | (Ukraine) UKR | Ruslan Babenko | 2 | 0 | 0+2 | 0 | 0+0 | 0 | 0+0 | 0 |
| 44 | DF | (Ukraine) UKR | Artem Fedetskiy | 23 | 2 | 12+4 | 1 | 1+0 | 0 | 3+3 | 1 |
| 77 | GK | (Ukraine) UKR | Denys Shelikhov | 5 | 0 | 4+0 | 0 | 1+0 | 0 | 0+0 | 0 |
| 88 | MF | (Ukraine) UKR | Oleksandr Aliyev | 18 | 4 | 6+6 | 2 | 1+0 | 0 | 4+1 | 2 |
| 91 | GK | (Ukraine) UKR | Ihor Vartsaba | 2 | 0 | 2+0 | 0 | 0+0 | 0 | 0+0 | 0 |
| 99 | FW | (Brazil) BRA | Matheus | 38 | 10 | 18+9 | 6 | 1+1 | 1 | 6+3 | 3 |
Players away from the club on loan:
| 2 | DF | (Ghana) GHA | Samuel Inkoom | 1 | 0 | 0+0 | 0 | 0+1 | 0 | 0+0 | 0 |
Players who appeared for Dnipro who left the club during the season:
| 19 | DF | (Uzbekistan) UZB | Vitaliy Dzyanisaw | 17 | 1 | 7+3 | 1 | 2+0 | 0 | 1+4 | 0 |
| 20 | MF | (Ghana) GHA | Derek Boateng | 2 | 0 | 2+0 | 0 | 0+0 | 0 | 0+0 | 0 |
| 23 | DF | (Nigeria) NGR | Michael Odibe | 13 | 1 | 7+2 | 1 | 0+0 | 0 | 2+2 | 0 |

=== Goal scorers ===
| Place | Position | Nation | Number | Name | Premier League | Ukrainian Cup | Europa League | Total |
|---|---|---|---|---|---|---|---|---|
| 1 | FW | (Brazil) | 99 | Matheus | 6 | 3 | 3 | 12 |
| 2 | MF | (Brazil) | 8 | Giuliano | 9 | 1 | 1 | 11 |
| 3 | FW | (Ukraine) | 18 | Roman Zozulya | 8 | 0 | 2 | 10 |
| 3 | FW | (Ukraine) | 21 | Yevhen Seleznyov | 7 | 0 | 3 | 10 |
| 3 | FW | (Croatia) | 9 | Nikola Kalinić | 6 | 1 | 3 | 10 |
| 6 | FW | (Ukraine) | 88 | Oleksandr Aliyev | 2 | 0 | 4 | 6 |
| 7 | MF | (Ukraine) | 10 | Yevhen Konoplianka | 2 | 0 | 3 | 5 |
| 7 | MF | (Ukraine) | 4 | Serhiy Kravchenko | 3 | 1 | 1 | 5 |
| 9 | MF | (Ukraine) | 29 | Ruslan Rotan | 4 | 0 | 0 | 4 |
| 10 | DF | (Ukraine) | 44 | Artem Fedetskiy | 1 | 0 | 2 | 3 |
| 11 | MF | (Ukraine) | 11 | Denys Oliynyk | 2 | 0 | 0 | 2 |
| 11 | | | | Own goal | 1 | 0 | 1 | 2 |
| 13 | DF | (Uzbekistan) | 19 | Vitaliy Dzyanisaw | 1 | 0 | 0 | 1 |
| 13 | MF | (Nigeria) | 23 | Michael Odibe | 1 | 0 | 0 | 1 |
| 13 | MF | (Georgia (country)) | 19 | Alexander Kobakhidze | 1 | 0 | 0 | 1 |
| 13 | MF | (Ukraine) | 28 | Yevhen Shakhov | 1 | 0 | 0 | 1 |
| 13 | DF | (Ukraine) | 5 | Vitaliy Mandzyuk | 0 | 0 | 1 | 1 |
| | | | | TOTALS | 54 | 6 | 23 | 73 |

=== Disciplinary record ===
| Number | Nation | Position | Name | Premier League | | Ukrainian Cup | | Europa League | | Total | |
| Number | Nation | Position | Name | Yellow card | Red card | Yellow card | Red card | Yellow card | Red card | Yellow card | Red card |
| 3 | (Czech Republic) | DF | Ondřej Mazuch | 6 | 1 | 0 | 0 | 4 | 0 | 10 | 1 |
| 4 | (Ukraine) | MF | Serhiy Kravchenko | 3 | 0 | 0 | 0 | 1 | 0 | 4 | 0 |
| 5 | (Ukraine) | DF | Vitaliy Mandzyuk | 7 | 1 | 0 | 0 | 2 | 0 | 9 | 1 |
| 6 | (Georgia (country)) | MF | Jaba Kankava | 6 | 0 | 1 | 0 | 3 | 1 | 10 | 1 |
| 8 | (Brazil) | MF | Giuliano | 2 | 0 | 0 | 0 | 0 | 0 | 2 | 0 |
| 9 | (Croatia) | FW | Nikola Kalinić | 3 | 0 | 0 | 0 | 0 | 1 | 3 | 1 |
| 10 | (Ukraine) | MF | Yevhen Konoplianka | 3 | 1 | 0 | 0 | 2 | 0 | 5 | 1 |
| 14 | (Ukraine) | DF | Yevhen Cheberyachko | 5 | 1 | 0 | 0 | 3 | 0 | 8 | 1 |
| 16 | (Czech Republic) | GK | Jan Laštůvka | 5 | 0 | 0 | 0 | 0 | 0 | 5 | 0 |
| 17 | (Croatia) | DF | Ivan Strinić | 4 | 0 | 0 | 0 | 2 | 0 | 6 | 0 |
| 18 | (Ukraine) | FW | Roman Zozulya | 9 | 0 | 0 | 0 | 0 | 0 | 9 | 0 |
| 19 | (Uzbekistan) | DF | Vitaliy Dzyanisaw | 1 | 0 | 0 | 0 | 0 | 0 | 1 | 0 |
| 21 | (Ukraine) | FW | Yevhen Seleznyov | 5 | 0 | 0 | 0 | 2 | 0 | 7 | 0 |
| 23 | (Nigeria) | DF | Michael Odibe | 1 | 0 | 0 | 0 | 1 | 0 | 2 | 0 |
| 23 | (Brazil) | MF | Douglas | 2 | 1 | 0 | 0 | 0 | 0 | 2 | 1 |
| 29 | (Ukraine) | MF | Ruslan Rotan | 7 | 0 | 1 | 0 | 1 | 0 | 9 | 0 |
| 44 | (Ukraine) | DF | Artem Fedetskiy | 5 | 1 | 0 | 1 | 1 | 0 | 6 | 2 |
| 88 | (Ukraine) | MF | Oleksandr Aliyev | 2 | 0 | 0 | 0 | 1 | 0 | 3 | 0 |
| 99 | (Brazil) | FW | Matheus | 2 | 0 | 0 | 0 | 0 | 0 | 2 | 0 |
| | | | TOTALS | 78 | 6 | 2 | 1 | 23 | 2 | 103 | 9 |

== Team kit ==
These are the 2012–13 Dnipro Dnipropetrovsk kits.

Supplier: Nike
Sponsor(s): TM Biola

| Home Kit | Away Kit | 3rd Kit |
