= 2013–14 FC Dnipro Dnipropetrovsk season =

Dnipro
2013–14 season
- President: Ihor Kolomoyskyi
- Manager: Juande Ramos
- Stadium: Dnipro Arena
- Premier League: 2nd
- Ukrainian Cup: Round of 16 (vs. Chornomorets Odesa)
- Europa League: Round of 32 (vs. Tottenham Hotspur)
- Top goalscorer: League: Yevhen Seleznyov (9); All: Yevhen Seleznyov (12)
- Highest home attendance: 29,082 vs Shakhtar Donetsk; 25 August 2013
- Lowest home attendance: 5,157 vs Pandurii Târgu Jiu; 28 November 2013
- Average home league attendance: 17,404; 8 April 2014
Home colours	Away colours

The 2013–14 season was Dnipro's 23rd Ukrainian Premier League season, and their fourth season under manager Juande Ramos. They ended the season in Round of 32 of the UEFA Europa League, where they were eliminated by Tottenham Hotspur; they were excluded from the Ukrainian Cup for failing to attend their game.

Following the compulsory winter break the championship was due to resume on 1 March 2014, but due to the civil unrest in the country after the riots in Kyiv and continuing on with the annexation of Crimea by the Russian Federation, the Premier League delayed the start of the spring stage. A decision was made by the Ukrainian Premier League to resume the competition on 15 March.

== Squad ==
Note: Flags indicate national team as defined under FIFA eligibility rules; some limited exceptions apply. Players may hold more than one non-FIFA nationality.

No.	Pos.	Nation	Player
2	DF	ROU	Alexandru Vlad
3	DF	CZE	Ondřej Mazuch
4	MF	UKR	Serhiy Kravchenko
5	DF	UKR	Vitaliy Mandzyuk
6	MF	GEO	Jaba Kankava
7	MF	UKR	Denys Kulakov
8	MF	BRA	Giuliano
9	FW	CRO	Nikola Kalinić
10	MF	UKR	Yevhen Konoplyanka
11	FW	UKR	Yevhen Seleznyov
14	DF	UKR	Yevhen Cheberyachko
16	GK	CZE	Jan Laštůvka
17	DF	CRO	Ivan Strinić
18	FW	UKR	Roman Zozulya

No.	Pos.	Nation	Player
19	FW	GEO	Alexander Kobakhidze
20	MF	POR	Bruno Gama
23	DF	BRA	Douglas
28	MF	UKR	Yevhen Shakhov
29	MF	UKR	Ruslan Rotan (captain)
33	DF	GEO	Ucha Lobjanidze
36	MF	UKR	Ruslan Babenko
44	DF	UKR	Artem Fedetskyi
71	GK	UKR	Denys Boyko (on loan from Dynamo Kyiv)
77	GK	UKR	Denys Shelikhov
89	MF	UKR	Serhiy Politylo
91	GK	UKR	Ihor Vartsaba
97	MF	UKR	Andriy Blyznychenko
99	FW	BRA	Matheus

=== Out on loan ===
Note: Flags indicate national team as defined under FIFA eligibility rules; some limited exceptions apply. Players may hold more than one non-FIFA nationality.

No.	Pos.	Nation	Player
—	DF	GHA	Samuel Inkoom (at Platanias)
—	DF	CMR	Éric Matoukou (at Volyn Lutsk)
—	DF	UKR	Pavlo Pashayev (at Karpaty Lviv)
—	MF	UKR	Hennadiy Pasich (at Naftovyk-Ukrnafta)
—	MF	UKR	Yevhen Pasich (at Naftovyk-Ukrnafta)

No.	Pos.	Nation	Player
—	MF	CRO	Mladen Bartulović (at Karpaty Lviv)
—	MF	UKR	Valeriy Fedorchuk (at Karpaty Lviv)
—	FW	UKR	Oleksandr Hladkyy (at Karpaty Lviv)
—	FW	UKR	Yevhen Bokhashvili (at Karpaty Lviv)

== Transfers ==
=== Summer ===
In: Note: Flags indicate national team as defined under FIFA eligibility rules; some limited exceptions apply. Players may hold more than one non-FIFA nationality.

No.	Pos.	Nation	Player
2	DF	ROU	Alexandru Vlad (from (Romania) Pandurii Târgu Jiu)
20	MF	POR	Bruno Gama (from (Spain) Deportivo de La Coruña)
33	DF	GEO	Ucha Lobjanidze (loan return from (Ukraine) Kryvbas Kryvyi Rih)
71	GK	UKR	Denys Boyko (loan from (Ukraine) Dynamo Kyiv)
89	MF	UKR	Serhiy Politylo (from (Ukraine) Chornomorets Odesa)

Out: Note: Flags indicate national team as defined under FIFA eligibility rules; some limited exceptions apply. Players may hold more than one non-FIFA nationality.

No.	Pos.	Nation	Player
20	MF	GHA	Derek Boateng (to (England) Fulham)
24	DF	CMR	Éric Matoukou (loan to (Ukraine) Volyn Lutsk)
77	GK	UKR	Denys Shelikhov (loan to (Ukraine) Volyn Lutsk)
—	DF	UKR	Pavlo Pashayev (to (Ukraine) Karpaty Lviv)
—	MF	CRO	Mladen Bartulović (to (Ukraine) Karpaty Lviv)
—	MF	UKR	Valeriy Fedorchuk (to (Ukraine) Karpaty Lviv)
—	FW	UKR	Oleksandr Hladkyy (to (Ukraine) Karpaty Lviv)
—	FW	UKR	Yevhen Bokhashvili (to (Ukraine) Karpaty Lviv)

=== Winter ===
In: Note: Flags indicate national team as defined under FIFA eligibility rules; some limited exceptions apply. Players may hold more than one non-FIFA nationality.

No.	Pos.	Nation	Player
77	GK	UKR	Denys Shelikhov (loan return from (Ukraine) Volyn Lutsk)

Out: Note: Flags indicate national team as defined under FIFA eligibility rules; some limited exceptions apply. Players may hold more than one non-FIFA nationality.

No.	Pos.	Nation	Player
13	DF	CMR	Samuel Inkoom (to (Greece) Platanias)
—	MF	UKR	Hennadiy Pasich (to (Ukraine) Naftovyk-Ukrnafta)
—	MF	UKR	Yevhen Pasich (to (Ukraine) Naftovyk-Ukrnafta)

== Competitions ==
=== Ukrainian Premier League ===
==== Results ====
13 July 2013 1	Dnipro	Awardered	Arsenal Kyiv	Dnipropetrovsk
19:30 EEST (UTC+3)		Summary		Stadium: Dnipro Arena

19 July 2013 2	Illichivets Mariupol	0 – 2	Dnipro	Mariupol
20:45 EEST (UTC+3)		Summary	Konoplyanka 39'; Seleznyov 52'	Stadium: Illichivets Stadium; Attendance: 5,500; Referee: Kostyantin Trukhanov

27 July 2013 3	Dnipro	1 – 3	Zorya Luhansk	Dnipropetrovsk
19:30 EEST (UTC+3)	Matheus 37'	Summary	Cheberyachko 4' (o.g.); Chaykovskyi 56'; Danilo 78'	Stadium: Dnipro-Arena; Attendance: 17,200; Referee: Victor Shvetsov

3 August 2013 4	Volyn Lutsk	1 – 3	Dnipro	Lutsk
19:30 EEST (UTC+3)	Schumacher 29'; Kinash (yellow card) 58' (yellow-red card) 65'	Summary	Giuliano 38'; Seleznyov 74', 75'	Stadium: Avanhard Stadium; Attendance: 5,100; Referee: Anatloiy Abdula

11 August 2013 5	Dnipro	1 – 0	Hoverla Uzhhorod	Dnipropetrovsk
17:00 EEST (UTC+3)	Kalinić 44'	Summary		Stadium: Dnipro Arena; Attendance: 15,641; Referee: Olexander Derdo

17 August 2013 6	Sevastopol	1 – 1	Dnipro	Bakhchysarai
19:00 EEST (UTC+3)	Yaroshenko 39'; Fedoriv (yellow card) 49' (yellow-red card) 90+8'	Summary	Seleznyov 51'	Stadium: Sevastopol Sports Complex; Attendance: 5,641; Referee: Kostyantin Trukhanov

25 August 2013 7	Dnipro	3 – 1	Shakhtar Donetsk	Dnipropetrovsk
19:30 EEST (UTC+3)	Zozulya 47', 63'; Seleznyov 73' (pen.)	Summary	Kucher 90+1'	Stadium: Dnipro Arena; Attendance: 29,082; Referee: Anatoliy Zhabchenko

1 September 2013 8	Dynamo Kyiv	1 – 1	Dnipro	Kyiv
19:30 EEST (UTC+3)	Yarmolenko 64'	Summary	Zozulya 22'	Stadium: Olympic Stadium; Attendance: 51,378; Referee: Antaoliy Abdula

15 September 2013 9	Dnipro	1 – 0	Tavriya Simferopol	Dnipropetrovsk
17:00 EEST (UTC+3)	Seleznyov 70'	Summary		Stadium: Dnipro Arena; Attendance: 15,082; Referee: Dmitiry Kutakov

22 September 2013 10	Metalurh Zaporizhya	2 – 3	Dnipro	Zaporizhia
16:00 EEST (UTC+3)	Shturko 1'; Sakhnevych 45'	Summary	Kalinić 9', 33'; Zozulya 75'	Stadium: Slavutych-Arena; Attendance: 11,000; Referee: Evgen Aranovskiy

28 September 2013 11	Dnipro	2 – 0	Chornomorets Odesa	Dnipropetrovsk
19:30 EEST (UTC+3)	Kalinić 45'; Konoplyanka 75'	Summary	Antonov (red card) 70'	Stadium: Dnipro Arena; Attendance: 15,397; Referee: Yuri Mozharovskiy

19 October 2013 13	Karpaty Lviv	0 – 4	Dnipro	Lviv
17:00 EEST (UTC+3)		Summary	Gama 16', 29'; Matheus 60'; Seleznyov 63'	Stadium: Ukraina Stadium; Attendance: 14,300; Referee: Olexander Derdo

27 October 2013 14	Dnipro	2 – 2	Vorskla Poltava	Dnipropetrovsk
19:30 EEST (UTC+3)	Konoplyanka 16'; Douglas 39'	Summary	Dedechko 54'; Mazuch 90+5' (o.g.)	Stadium: Dnipro Arena; Attendance: 13,167; Referee: Dmitiry Kutakov

3 November 2013 15	Metalurh Donetsk	1 – 1	Dnipro	Donetsk
16:00 EET (UTC+2)	Checher 58'	Summary	Konoplyanka 13'; Zozulya (yellow card) 89' (yellow-red card) 90+4'	Stadium: Metalurh Stadium; Attendance: 3,400; Referee: Yuri Mozharovskiy

10 November 2013 16	Arsenal Kyiv	Awarded	Dnipro	Kyiv
17:00 EET (UTC+2)		Summary		Stadium: Dynamo Stadium; Referee: Oleksander Golovkov

23 November 2013 17	Dnipro	3 – 1	Illichivets Mariupol	Dnipropetrovsk
19:30 EET (UTC+2)	Matheus 16'; Giuliano 23'; Gama 88'	Summary	Polyanskiy 90+1'	Stadium: Dnipro Arena; Attendance: 10,163; Referee: Kostyantin Trukhanov

1 December 2013 18	Zorya Luhansk	3 – 0	Dnipro	Dnipropetrovsk
13:30 EET (UTC+2)	Danilo 68', 73'; Boli 87'	Summary	Cheberyachko (yellow card) 33' (yellow-red card) 81'	Stadium: Dnipro Arena; Attendance: 5,500; Referee: Anatloiy Abdula

4 December 2013 12	Dnipro	2 – 2	Metalist Kharkiv	Dnipropetrovsk
20:00 EET (UTC+2)	Mandzyuk 9'; Zozulya 14'	Summary	Edmar 30'; Dević 82'	Stadium: Dnipro Arena; Attendance: 27,739; Referee: Anatoliy Zhabchenko

9 March 2014 20	Hoverla Uzhhorod	Postponed	Dnipro	Uzhhorod
14:00 EEST (UTC+3)		Summary		Stadium: Avanhard Stadium

15 March 2014 21	Dnipro	3 – 0	Sevastopol	Dnipropetrovsk
19:30 EEST (UTC+3)	Seleznyov 18', 36'; Konoplyanka 85'	Summary		Stadium: Dnipro Arena; Attendance: 10,209; Referee: Dmitiry Kutakov

22 March 2014 22	Shakhtar Donetsk	0 – 2	Dnipro	Donetsk
17:00 EEST (UTC+3)		Summary	Fedetskyi 45'; Matheus 83'	Stadium: Donbas Arena; Attendance: 33,827; Referee: Anatloiy Abdula

30 March 2014 23	Dnipro	2 – 0	Dynamo Kyiv	Dnipropetrovsk
17:00 EEST (UTC+3)	Matheus 45+2', 58'	Summary		Stadium: Dnipro Arena; Attendance: 27,160; Referee: Yuri Mozharovskiy

5 April 2014 24	Tavriya Simferopol	0 – 2	Dnipro	Simferopol
14:00 EEST (UTC+3)		Summary	Giuliano 9'; Kalinić 54' (pen.)	Stadium: RSC Lokomotiv; Attendance: 1,700; Referee: Evgen Aranovskiy

12 April 2014 25	Dnipro	1 – 0	Metalurh Zaporizhya	Dnipropetrovsk
19:30 EEST (UTC+3)	Seleznyov 75'	Summary		Stadium: Dnipro Arena; Attendance: 11,006; Referee: Yuriy Moseychuk

15 April 2014 19	Dnipro	5 – 1	Volyn Lutsk	Dnipropetrovsk
19:00 EEST (UTC+3)	Seleznyov 55'; Matheus 57', 66', 70', 90'	Summary	Celin 45'	Stadium: Dnipro Arena; Attendance: 12,176; Referee: Sergiy Lysenchuk

20 April 2014 26	Chornomorets Odesa	1 – 0	Dnipro	Odesa
19:30 EEST (UTC+3)	Okriashvili 34'	Summary		Stadium: Chornomorets Stadium; Attendance: 15,121; Referee: Anatoliy Zhabchenko

24 April 2014 20	Hoverla Uzhhorod	0 – 2	Dnipro	Uzhhorod
17:00 EEST (UTC+3)		Summary	Kravchenko (red card) 61'; Konoplyanka 64'; Giuliano 90+4'	Stadium: Avanhard Stadium; Attendance: 5,300; Referee: Yury Vaks

27 April 2014 27	Metalist Kharkiv	2 – 1	Dnipro	Kharkiv
19:30 EEST (UTC+3)	Gómez 36'; Blanco 87'	Summary	Kalinić 81' (pen.)	Stadium: OSC Metalist; Attendance: 29,656; Referee: Yuri Mozharovskiy

4 May 2014 28	Dnipro	1 – 4	Karpaty Lviv	Dnipropetrovsk
19:30 EEST (UTC+3)	Seleznyov 49'	Summary	Zenjov 55' (pen.); Lyopa 63'; Hladkyy 83', 90+7'	Stadium: Dnipro Arena; Attendance: 15,592

11 May 2014 29	Vorskla Poltava	1 – 4	Dnipro	Poltava
19:30 EEST (UTC+3)	Chesnakov 16'	Summary	Rotan (yellow card) 51' (yellow-red card) 61'; Konoplyanka 68'; Zozulya 80'; Matheus 89', 90+2'	Stadium: Oleksiy Butovskyi Vorskla Stadium; Attendance: 0 Referee: Yuriy Moseychuk

18 May 2014 30	Dnipro	3 – 1	Metalurh Donetsk	Dnipropetrovsk
17:00 EEST (UTC+3)	Giuliano 3', 31'; Matheus 54'; Mazuch (red card) 83'	Summary	O'Dea 44'; Moraes (red card) 83'	Stadium: Dnipro Arena; Attendance: 19,878; Referee: Yuri Mozharovskiy

==== League table ====
Pos	Team	Pld	W	D	L	GF	GA	GD	Pts	Qualification or relegation
1	Shakhtar Donetsk (C)	28	21	2	5	62	23	+39	65	Qualification for the Champions League group stage
2	Dnipro Dnipropetrovsk	28	18	5	5	56	28	+28	59	Qualification for the Champions League third qualifying round (Note: On 18 June 2014, UEFA published the seeding ranking for the upcoming 2014-15 UEFA Champions League season, where FC Dnipro Dnipropetrovsk were pending approval of the UEFA Club Financial Control Body (CFCB) on 19 June 2014 to participate in the competition. The main issue that might have impeded Dnipro to participate in the continental competitions was the "Boateng case". The conflict arose during the 2012-13 season when Derek Boateng unsuccessfully tried to leave the club due to breach of contract and was forced to file a case against the club through the Court of Arbitration for Sport (CAS) in Lausanne. The end result was that Dnipro did play in the 2014-15 Champions League 3rd qualifying round (and, subsequently, the Europa League).)
3	Metalist Kharkiv	28	16	9	3	54	29	+25	57	Qualification for the Europa League play-off round
4	Dynamo Kyiv	28	16	5	7	55	33	+22	53	Qualification for the Europa League group stage (Note: FC Dynamo Kyiv qualified for the Group Stage of the 2014-15 Europa League as the 2013-14 Ukrainian Cup winner.)
5	Chornomorets Odesa	28	12	10	6	30	22	+8	46	Qualification for the Europa League third qualifying round

Source: uafootball.net.ua
Rules for classification: 1st points; 2nd goal difference; 3rd goals scored; 4th head-to-head points; 5th head-to-head goal difference; 6th head-to-head goals scored; 7th fair play rating
(C) Champions

=== Ukrainian Cup ===
25 September 2013 Round of 32	Bukovyna Chernivtsi	0 – 2	Dnipro	Chernivtsi
16:00 EEST (UTC+3)		Report	Selezniov 23'; Konoplianka 45'	Stadium: Bukovyna Stadium; Attendance: 10,052; Referee: Ivan Bondar

30 October 2013 Round of 16	Chornomorets Odesa	w/o	Dnipro	Odesa
19:45 EEST (UTC+3)		Summary		Stadium: Chornomorets Stadium

=== UEFA Europa League ===
==== Play-off ====
22 August 2013 Playoff Round 1st leg	Nõmme Kalju (Estonia)	1 – 3	(Ukraine) Dnipro	Tallinn, Estonia
20:00 EEST (UTC+3)	Toomet 54'	Report	Seleznyov 23' (pen.); Giuliano 36'; Zozulya 53'	Stadium: A. Le Coq Arena; Attendance: 2,462; Referee: Kristinn Jakobsson (Iceland)

29 August 2013 Playoff Round 2nd leg	Dnipro (Ukraine)	2 – 0 (5 – 1 agg.)	(Estonia) Nõmme Kalju	Dnipropetrovsk, Ukraine
21:30 EEST (UTC+3)	Kobakhidze 39'; Zozulya 70'	Report		Stadium: Dnipro-Arena; Attendance: 12,831; Referee: Gediminas Mažeika (Lithuania)

==== Group stage ====
Pos	Team	Pld	W	D	L	GF	GA	GD	Pts	Qualification
1	(Italy) Fiorentina	6	5	1	0	12	3	+9	16	Advance to knockout phase
2	(Ukraine) Dnipro Dnipropetrovsk	6	4	0	2	11	5	+6	12	Advance to knockout phase
3	(Portugal) Paços de Ferreira	6	0	3	3	1	8	−7	3	
4	(Romania) Pandurii Târgu Jiu	6	0	2	4	3	11	−8	2	

Source: Soccerway

19 September 2013 1	Pandurii Târgu Jiu (Romania)	0 – 1	(Ukraine) Dnipro	Cluj-Napoca, Romania
20:00 EEST (UTC+3)		Report	Rotan 38'	Stadium: Cluj Arena, Attendance: 7,577; Referee: Sascha Kever (Switzerland)

3 October 2013 2	Dnipro (Ukraine)	1 – 2	(Italy) Fiorentina	Dnipropetrovsk, Ukraine
22:05 EEST (UTC+3)	Seleznyov 57' (pen.)	Report	Gonzalo 53' (pen.); Ambrosini 73'; Pizarro (yellow card) 56' (yellow-red card) 86'	Stadium: Dnipro-Arena; Attendance: 25,837; Referee: Szymon Marciniak (Poland)

24 October 2013 3	Paços de Ferreira (Portugal)	0 – 2	(Ukraine) Dnipro	Guimarães, Portugal
22:05 EEST (UTC+3)		Report	Rotan 83'; Konoplyanka 86'	Stadium: Estádio D. Afonso Henriques; Attendance: 1,137; Referee: Tony Chapron (France)

7 November 2013 4	Dnipro (Ukraine)	2 – 0	(Portugal) Paços de Ferreira	Dnipropetrovsk, Ukraine
20:00 EET (UTC+2)	Matheus 44'; Konoplyanka 66'	Report		Stadium: Dnipro-Arena; Attendance: 14,039; Referee: Antti Munukka (Finland)

28 November 2013 5	Dnipro (Ukraine)	4 – 1	(Romania) Pandurii Târgu Jiu	Dnipropetrovsk, Ukraine
22:05 EET (UTC+2)	Kalinić 12'; Zozulya 56'; Shakhov 86'; Kravchenko 89'	Report	Eric 70' (pen.)	Stadium: Dnipro-Arena; Attendance: 5,157; Referee: Leontios Trattou (Cyprus)

12 December 2013 6	Fiorentina (Italy)	2 – 1	(Ukraine) Dnipro	Florence, Italy
20:00 EET (UTC+2)	Joaquín 42'; Cuadrado 77'	Report	Konoplyanka 13'	Stadium: Stadio Artemio Franchi; Attendance: 12,486; Referee: Artur Soares Dias (Portugal)

==== Knockout phase ====
20 February 2014 Round of 32 1st leg	Dnipro (Ukraine)	1 – 0	(England) Tottenham Hotspur	Dnipropetrovsk, Ukraine
20:00 EET (UTC+2)	Konoplyanka 81' (pen.)	Report		Stadium: Dnipro-Arena; Attendance: 22,356; Referee: Antonio Mateu Lahoz (Spain)

27 February 2014 Round of 32 2nd leg	Tottenham Hotspur (England)	3 – 1 (3 – 2 agg.)	(Ukraine) Dnipro	London, England
22:05 EET (UTC+2)	Eriksen 56'; Adebayor 65', 69'	Report	Zozulya 48', (red card) 62'	Stadium: White Hart Lane; Attendance: 34,815; Referee: Antony Gautier (France)

== Squad statistics ==
As of Match played 18 May 2014

=== Appearances and goals ===
No.	Pos	Nat	Player	Total		Premier League		Ukrainian Cup		Europa League	
No.	Pos	Nat	Player	Apps	Goals	Apps	Goals	Apps	Goals	Apps	Goals
2	DF	(Romania) ROU	Alexandru Vlad	12	0	4+1	0	1+0	0	6+0	0
3	DF	(Czech Republic) CZE	Ondřej Mazuch	32	0	25+0	0	0+0	0	7+0	0
4	MF	(Ukraine) UKR	Serhiy Kravchenko	11	1	4+4	0	0+1	0	2+0	1
5	DF	(Ukraine) UKR	Vitaliy Mandzyuk	18	1	9+3	1	1+0	0	5+0	0
6	MF	(Georgia (country)) GEO	Jaba Kankava	34	0	23+2	0	1+0	0	8+0	0
7	MF	(Ukraine) UKR	Denys Kulakov	16	0	2+8	0	0+0	0	2+4	0
8	MF	(Brazil) BRA	Giuliano	29	7	22+2	6	0+0	0	3+2	1
9	FW	(Croatia) CRO	Nikola Kalinić	23	7	6+13	6	0+0	0	3+1	1
10	MF	(Ukraine) UKR	Yevhen Konoplyanka	36	12	23+4	7	1+0	1	8+0	4
11	FW	(Ukraine) UKR	Yevhen Seleznyov	37	16	21+8	12	1+0	1	3+4	3
14	DF	(Ukraine) UKR	Yevhen Cheberyachko	35	0	22+2	0	1+0	0	10+0	0
16	GK	(Czech Republic) CZE	Jan Laštůvka	3	0	1+0	0	1+0	0	1+0	0
17	DF	(Croatia) CRO	Ivan Strinić	28	0	24+0	0	0+0	0	4+0	0
18	FW	(Ukraine) UKR	Roman Zozulya	35	10	15+9	6	1+0	0	8+2	4
19	FW	(Georgia (country)) GEO	Aleksandre Kobakhidze	6	1	1+1	0	0+1	0	2+1	1
20	MF	(Portugal) POR	Bruno Gama	17	3	4+6	3	0+1	0	5+1	0
23	DF	(Brazil) BRA	Douglas	14	1	9+3	1	1+0	0	1+0	0
28	MF	(Ukraine) UKR	Yevhen Shakhov	7	1	0+3	0	1+0	0	1+2	1
29	MF	(Ukraine) UKR	Ruslan Rotan	34	2	24+2	0	0+0	0	8+0	2
33	DF	(Georgia (country)) GEO	Ucha Lobjanidze	2	0	0+1	0	0+0	0	0+1	0
39	DF	(Ukraine) UKR	Oleksandr Svatok	1	0	0+0	0	0+0	0	0+1	0
44	DF	(Ukraine) UKR	Artem Fedetskyi	30	1	19+4	1	0+0	0	7+0	0
71	GK	(Ukraine) UKR	Denys Boyko	37	0	28+0	0	0+0	0	9+0	0
89	MF	(Ukraine) UKR	Serhiy Politylo	19	0	7+5	0	1+0	0	3+3	0
97	MF	(Ukraine) UKR	Andriy Blyznychenko	8	0	1+0	0	0+0	0	7+0	0
99	FW	(Brazil) BRA	Matheus	36	14	24+5	13	0+0	0	7+0	1
Players away from the club on loan:
Players who appeared for Dnipro who left the club during the season:

=== Goal scorers ===
Place	Position	Nation	Number	Name	Premier League	Ukrainian Cup	Europa League	Total
1	FW	(Ukraine)	11	Yevhen Seleznyov	12	1	2	15
2	FW	(Brazil)	99	Matheus	13	0	1	14
3	MF	(Ukraine)	10	Yevhen Konoplyanka	7	1	4	12
4	FW	(Ukraine)	18	Roman Zozulya	6	0	4	10
5	FW	(Croatia)	9	Nikola Kalinić	6	0	1	7
5	MF	(Brazil)	8	Giuliano	6	0	1	7
7	MF	(Portugal)	20	Bruno Gama	3	0	0	3
8	MF	(Ukraine)	29	Ruslan Rotan	0	0	2	2
9	MF	(Ukraine)	5	Vitaliy Mandzyuk	1	0	0	1
9	MF	(Ukraine)	44	Artem Fedetskyi	1	0	0	1
9	MF	(Brazil)	23	Douglas	1	0	0	1
9	FW	(Georgia (country))	19	Aleksandre Kobakhidze	0	0	1	1
9	MF	(Ukraine)	28	Yevhen Shakhov	0	0	1	1
9	MF	(Ukraine)	4	Serhiy Kravchenko	0	0	1	1
				TOTALS	56	2	18	76

=== Disciplinary record ===
Number	Nation	Position	Name	Premier League		Ukrainian Cup		Europa League		Total	
Number	Nation	Position	Name	Yellow card	Red card	Yellow card	Red card	Yellow card	Red card	Yellow card	Red card
3	(Czech Republic)	DF	Ondřej Mazuch	2	1	0	0	1	0	3	1
6	(Georgia (country))	MF	Jaba Kankava	8	0	0	0	1	0	9	0
7	(Ukraine)	MF	Denys Kulakov	0	0	0	0	2	0	2	0
8	(Brazil)	MF	Giuliano	3	0	0	0	0	0	3	0
10	(Ukraine)	MF	Yevhen Konoplyanka	3	0	0	0	0	0	3	0
11	(Ukraine)	FW	Yevhen Seleznyov	3	0	0	0	1	0	4	0
14	(Ukraine)	DF	Yevhen Cheberyachko	7	1	0	0	0	0	7	1
17	(Croatia)	DF	Ivan Strinić	4	0	0	0	1	0	5	0
18	(Ukraine)	FW	Roman Zozulya	8	1	0	0	2	1	10	2
20	(Portugal)	MF	Bruno Gama	2	0	0	0	0	0	2	0
28	(Ukraine)	MF	Yevhen Shakhov	0	0	0	0	1	0	1	0
29	(Ukraine)	MF	Ruslan Rotan	5	1	0	0	2	0	7	1
33	(Georgia (country))	DF	Ucha Lobjanidze	0	0	0	0	1	0	1	0
39	(Ukraine)	DF	Oleksandr Svatok	0	0	0	0	1	0	1	0
44	(Ukraine)	DF	Artem Fedetskyi	6	0	0	0	0	0	6	0
71	(Ukraine)	GK	Denys Boyko	7	0	0	0	0	0	7	0
89	(Ukraine)	DF	Serhiy Politylo	2	0	0	0	0	0	2	0
99	(Brazil)	FW	Matheus	2	0	0	0	0	0	2	0
			TOTALS	62	4	0	0	13	1	75	5

== Notes ==
1. Match was not played. Dnipro Dnipropetrovsk did not arrive for the match as the plane with the team was not able to land due to fog forcing airport closures. Control Disciplinary Committee of the Football Federation of Ukraine deny Dnipro's request to play the match at a later date and are expelled from the Cup competition. Chornomorets advance to the next round of the competition.
2. Pandurii Târgu Jiu played their home matches at Cluj Arena, Cluj-Napoca instead of their regular stadium, Stadionul Tudor Vladimirescu, Târgu Jiu.
3. Paços de Ferreira played their home matches at Estádio D. Afonso Henriques, Guimarães instead of their regular stadium, Estádio da Mata Real, Paços de Ferreira.
4. Dnipro vs Metalist Kharkiv was originally played on 6 October 2013 but play was suspended in 45th minute at 2-1 due to floodlight problems; The remaining 45 minutes were played on 4 December 2013.
5. On 9 May 2014 the FFU announced that all remaining League games, as well as the Cup Final, would be played behind closed doors due to security fear relating to the unrest in the country.
