= Yevhen Seleznyov =

Ukrainian footballer

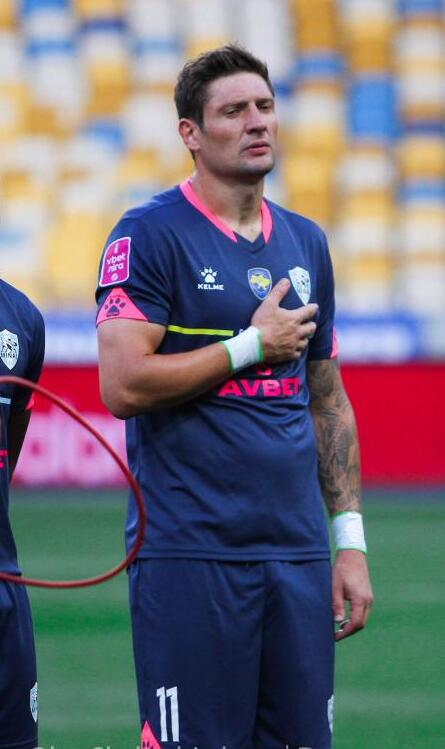
- Seleznyov with Mynai in 2021

Personal information
- Full name: Yevhen Oleksandrovych Seleznyov
- Date of birth: 20 July 1985 (age 41)
- Place of birth: Makiivka, Ukrainian SSR (now Ukraine)
- Height: 1.88 m (6 ft 2 in)
- Position: Striker

Senior career*
Years	Team	Apps	(Gls)
2002–2009	Shakhtar Donetsk	26	(7)
2002–2004	→ Shakhtar-3 Donetsk	41	(9)
2002–2006	→ Shakhtar-2 Donetsk	53	(19)
2006–2008	→ Arsenal Kyiv (loan)	36	(19)
2009–2011	Dnipro Dnipropetrovsk	51	(30)
2011–2012	Shakhtar Donetsk	26	(16)
2012–2016	Dnipro Dnipropetrovsk	88	(38)
2016	Kuban Krasnodar	9	(3)
2016	Shakhtar Donetsk	3	(1)
2017	Karabükspor	29	(7)
2018–2019	Akhisarspor	24	(9)
2019	→ Málaga (loan)	12	(0)
2019–2020	Bursaspor	28	(10)
2020–2021	Kolos Kovalivka	10	(5)
2021–2023	Mynai	17	(1)
Total		453	(174)

International career
2005	Ukraine U21	1	(0)
2008–2018	Ukraine	58	(11)
- * Club domestic league appearances and goals

Yevhen Oleksandrovych Seleznyov (Ukrainian: Євген Олександрович Селезньов; born 20 July 1985) is a former Ukrainian professional footballer.

He previously played three spells at Shakhtar Donetsk, winning the UEFA Cup in 2009, and a domestic double three years later. He was the league's top scorer in their double-winning season, and maintained the honour the following season with Dnipro.

A full international since 2008, Seleznyov has earned over 50 caps for Ukraine, scoring 11 international goals. He was part of their squad when they co-hosted UEFA Euro 2012.

== Career ==
=== Shakhtar Donetsk ===
Born in Makiivka, Ukrainian SSR, Soviet Union, Yevhen Seleznyov is a product of the Shakhtar Donetsk and the Shakhtar Makiivka academies. After being promoted to professional level in 2002, he had difficult time to secure its place in the first team and played for the club's second and third teams in lower leagues as well as the club's reserve team. His chance to distinguish himself at premiers Seleznyov gained in the winter of 2007 when he went on a one-and-a-half year loan deal to Arsenal Kyiv. Seleznyov was one of the top goal-scorers in the 2007–08 Ukrainian Premier League, having scored 17 goals in 24 games. Soon after returning to Donetsk he was called up to the Ukraine national team.

On completion of his loan, he returned to Donetsk and signed a 5-year deal. He scored his first goal for Shakhtar on 3 August against Illichivets Mariupol in a 3–0 victory· He played three matches in the UEFA Champions League, including a 5–0 home win over FC Basel, in which he came on as a substitute and scored a goal.

He made two appearances in the UEFA Cup as they won it in his first season at the club: on 19 February 2009, a minute after replacing Oleksandr Hladkyy, he headed in Jádson's free kick with his first touch of the game to score past Tottenham Hotspur goalkeeper Heurelho Gomes to open a 2–0 win.

=== Dnipro Dnipropetrovsk ===
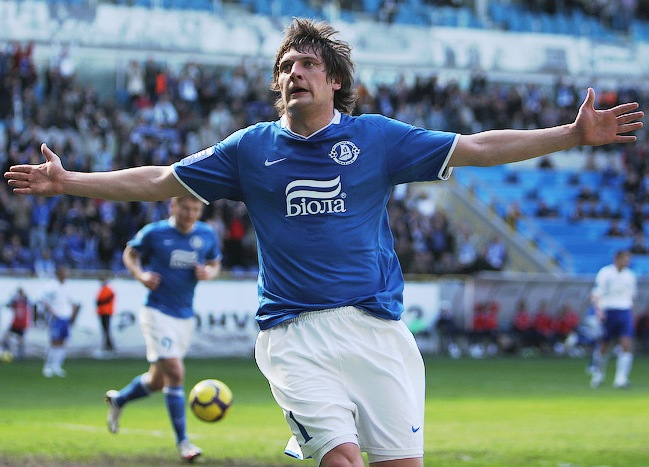
Seleznyov celebrating with Dnipro in April 2010

On 25 July 2009, Seleznyov signed with rivals Dnipro Dnipropetrovsk in a deal worth €4.5 million. That same day, he scored his first goal for Dnipro on his debut against Metalist Kharkiv. In the next two seasons, Seleznyov established himself at Dnipro as a target man of good scoring ability, especially with his head. He was the top scorer of the 2010–11 Ukrainian Premier League season with 17 goals in 24 games.

=== Return to Shakhtar Donetsk ===
On 22 June 2011, Dnipro re-sold him to his previous club Shakhtar Donetsk. The transfer fee was undisclosed but it is estimated to be around €5 million. In September 2011 Seleznyov was involved in multi car pile up, while driving his Maserati in Donetsk. Luckily nobody got physically hurt.

At the end of the 2011–12 season, Seleznyov was Shakhtar's top league goalscorer, and joint top league scorer outright with Maicon with 14, despite the latter scoring two penalties. Seleznyov scored against APOEL Nicosia in the Champions League, in a 2–0 win.

=== Return to Dnipro Dnipropetrovsk ===
On 29 August 2012, Seleznyov went back to Dnipro for an undisclosed fee.

On 7 May 2015, Seleznyov scored an 80th-minute equaliser in the Europa League semi-final first leg against Napoli, making it 1–1 and giving Dnipro the away goals advantage heading into the second leg. In the second leg, at the Olympic Stadium in Kyiv, a week later, Seleznyov scored the only goal of the game as Dnipro won 1–0, to go through to their first European final on 27 May 2015, 2–1 winners on aggregate. Dnipro lost the final 3–2, with Seleznyov entering the game in the 78th minute.

=== Kuban Krasnodar ===
On 25 February 2016, he signed a contract with the Russian team FC Kuban Krasnodar. Seleznyov was released by Dnipro to Kuban for free under a condition that Seleznyov will forgive the club's debts which exceed over 1 mln Euros. Before signing with Kuban, Seleznyov refused offers from some clubs of the English Premier League.

On 11 May 2016 in an interview with the channel Football 1 Yevhen Seleznyov confirmed that he terminated the contract with Kuban. Following that season Kuban relegated to the Russian First League.

=== Second return to Shakhtar Donetsk ===
On 14 May 2016, FC Shakhtar Donetsk confirmed that the club had signed a 2-year contract with Seleznyov. In December 2016 on mutual consent Seleznyov left the club.

=== Kardemir Karabükspor ===
Less than a week later after leaving Shakhtar, it was announced that Seleznyov signed a contract with the Turkish Kardemir Karabükspor which only recently returned to the Turkish Super League.

=== Akhisarspor ===
On 10 May 2018, Seleznyov helped Akhisar Belediyespor win their first professional trophy, the 2017–18 Turkish Cup.

== International career ==
On 24 May 2008, he made his debut for the Ukraine national football team in a friendly against Netherlands. He scored his first international goal against Norway in Dnipropetrovsk on 19 November, the only goal of the game.

Seleznyov was a member of Ukraine's squad as they co-hosted UEFA Euro 2012, but did not enter the field of play in their group stage exit.

On 6 September 2013, Seleznyov was one of nine Ukrainian players to score in their 9–0 thrashing of San Marino at the Arena Lviv in qualification for the following year's World Cup. He scored his first international two-goal haul on 15 October in the reverse fixture, as Ukraine won 8–0 in Serravalle; the result qualified Ukraine for the play-offs, which they lost to France.

== Career statistics ==
=== Club ===
Club	Season	League			National cup (Note: Includes Ukrainian Cup, Russian Cup, Turkish Cup)		Continental		Other		Total	
Club	Season	Division	Apps	Goals	Apps	Goals	Apps	Goals	Apps	Goals	Apps	Goals
Arsenal Kyiv	2006–07	Vyshcha Liha	12	2	0	0	–		–		12	2
Arsenal Kyiv	2007–08	Vyshcha Liha	24	17	0	0	–		–		24	17
Arsenal Kyiv	Total		36	19	0	0	–		–		36	19
Shakhtar Donetsk	2008–09	Ukrainian Premier League	26	7	2	2	5 (Note: Three appearances and one goal in UEFA Champions League, two appearances and one goal in UEFA Cup)	2	1 (Note: Appearance in Ukrainian Super Cup)	0	34	11
Dnipro Dnipropetrovsk	2009–10	Ukrainian Premier League	27	13	3	3	–		–		30	16
Dnipro Dnipropetrovsk	2010–11	Ukrainian Premier League	24	17	3	1	2 (Note: Appearances in UEFA Europa League)	1	–		29	19
Dnipro Dnipropetrovsk	Total		51	30	6	4	2	1	–		59	35
Shakhtar Donetsk	2011–12	Ukrainian Premier League	23	14	2	0	3 (Note: Appearances in UEFA Champions League)	1	1	0	29	15
Shakhtar Donetsk	2012–13	Ukrainian Premier League	3	2	0	0	–		–		3	2
Shakhtar Donetsk	Total		26	16	2	0	3	1	1	0	32	17
Dnipro Dnipropetrovsk	2012–13	Ukrainian Premier League	22	7	4	0	6	3	–		32	10
Dnipro Dnipropetrovsk	2013–14	Ukrainian Premier League	29	13	1	1	7	2	–		37	16
Dnipro Dnipropetrovsk	2014–15	Ukrainian Premier League	21	8	5	3	13 (Note: Two appearances in UEFA Champions League, eleven appearances and two goals in UEFA Europa League)	2	–		39	13
Dnipro Dnipropetrovsk	2015–16	Ukrainian Premier League	16	10	2	1	5	2	–		23	13
Dnipro Dnipropetrovsk	Total		88	38	12	5	31	9	–		131	52
Kuban Krasnodar	2015–16	Russian Premier League	9	3	1	0	–		–		10	3
Shakhtar Donetsk	2016–17	Ukrainian Premier League	3	1	1	0	2	1	1	0	7	2
Karabükspor	2016–17	Süper Lig	16	6	0	0	–		–		16	6
Karabükspor	2017–18	Süper Lig	13	1	2	1	–		–		15	2
Karabükspor	Total		29	7	2	1	–		–		31	8
Akhisar Belediyespor	2017–18	Süper Lig	17	6	5	4	–		–		22	10
Akhisar Belediyespor	2018–19	Süper Lig	7	3	0	0	3	0	1 (Note: Appearance in Turkish Super Cup)	1	11	4
Akhisar Belediyespor	Total		24	9	5	4	3	0	1	1	33	14
Málaga	2018–19	Segunda División	12	0	0	0	–		–		12	0
Career total			304	130	31	16	46	14	4	1	380	161

=== International ===
Appearances and goals by national team and year
National team	Year	Apps	Goals
Ukraine	2008	5	1
Ukraine	2009	8	3
Ukraine	2010	7	1
Ukraine	2011	7	0
Ukraine	2012	6	0
Ukraine	2013	9	4
Ukraine	2014	0	0
Ukraine	2015	6	2
Ukraine	2016	4	0
Ukraine	2017	3	0
Ukraine	2018	3	0
Ukraine	2019	0	0
Ukraine	Total	58	11

Scores and results list Ukraine's goal tally first, score column indicates score after each Seleznyov goal.

List of international goals scored by Yehven Seleznyov
No.	Date	Venue	Opponent	Score	Result	Competition
1	19 November 2008	Dnipro-Arena, Dnipropetrovsk, Ukraine	Norway	1–0	1–0	Friendly
2	2 February 2009	Tsirion Stadium, Limassol, Cyprus	Slovakia	2–1	3–2	2009 Cyprus International Football Tournament
3	5 September 2009	Valeriy Lobanovskyi Dynamo Stadium, Kyiv, Ukraine	Andorra	5–0	5–0	2010 FIFA World Cup qualification
4	14 October 2009	Comunal, Andorra la Vella, Andora	Andorra	5–0	6–0	2010 FIFA World Cup qualification
5	4 September 2010	Stadion Widzewa, Łódź, Poland	Poland	1–1	1–1	Friendly
6	14 August 2013	Olimpiyskiy National Sports Complex, Kyiv, Ukraine	Israel	2–0	2–0	Friendly
7	6 September 2013	Arena Lviv, Lviv, Ukraine	San Marino	2–0	9–0	2014 FIFA World Cup qualification
8	15 October 2013	Stadio Olimpico, Serravalle, San Marino	San Marino	1–0	8–0	2014 FIFA World Cup qualification
9	15 October 2013	Stadio Olimpico, Serravalle, San Marino	San Marino	3–0	8–0	2014 FIFA World Cup qualification
10	9 October 2015	Philip II Arena, Skopje, Macedonia	Macedonia	1–0	2–0	UEFA Euro 2016 qualification
11	14 November 2015	Arena Lviv, Lviv, Ukraine	Slovenia	2–0	2–0	UEFA Euro 2016 qualification

== Honours ==
Shakhtar Donetsk

- Ukrainian Premier League: 2011–12
- Ukrainian Cup: 2011–12
- Ukrainian Super Cup: 2008, 2012
- UEFA Cup: 2008–09

Dnipro Dnipropetrovsk

- UEFA Europa League runner-up: 2014–15

Akhisar Belediyespor

- Turkish Cup: 2017–18
- Turkish Super Cup: 2018

Individual

- Ukraine Premier League top scorer: 2010–11, 2011–12
- CIS Cup top scorer: 2006
- Serhiy Rebrov club: 111 goals
