= Giuliano de Paula =

Brazilian footballer (born 1990)

Giuliano
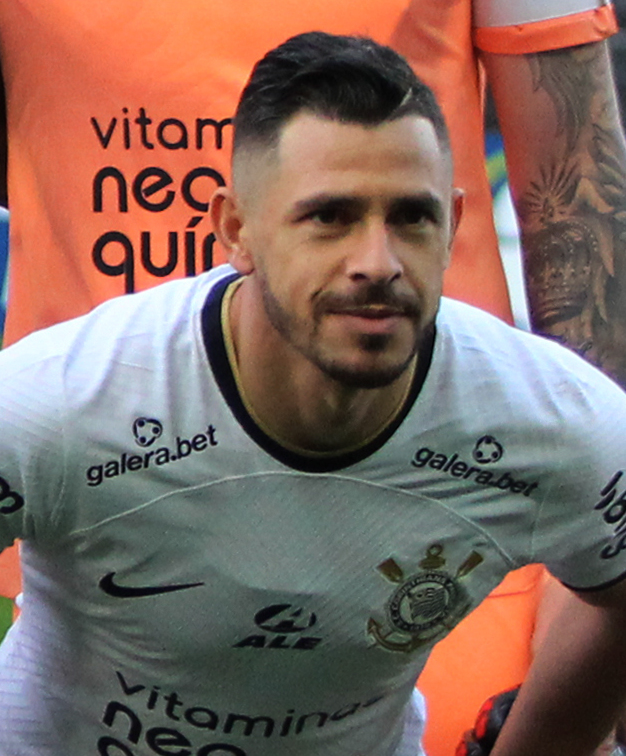
- Giuliano with Corinthians in 2022

Personal information
- Full name: Giuliano Victor de Paula
- Date of birth: 31 May 1990 (age 36)
- Place of birth: Curitiba, Brazil
- Height: 1.72 m (5 ft 8 in)
- Position: Attacking midfielder

Youth career
- 1999–2006: Paraná

Senior career*
Years	Team	Apps	(Gls)
2007–2008	Paraná	61	(8)
2009–2010	Internacional	79	(15)
2011–2014	Dnipro Dnipropetrovsk	87	(16)
2014–2016	Grêmio	90	(19)
2016–2017	Zenit Saint Petersburg	30	(8)
2017–2018	Fenerbahçe	31	(15)
2018–2020	Al-Nassr	58	(19)
2020–2021	İstanbul Başakşehir	23	(2)
2021–2023	Corinthians	110	(7)
2024	Santos	36	(12)
2025–2026	Athletico Paranaense	19	(3)

International career
2007	Brazil U17	5	(0)
2009	Brazil U20	14	(3)
2010–2017	Brazil	14	(0)
- * Club domestic league appearances and goals

Giuliano Victor de Paula (born 31 May 1990), simply known as Giuliano, is a Brazilian former professional footballer who played as an attacking midfielder.

== Club career ==
=== Paraná ===
Born in Curitiba, Paraná, Giuliano began his career with the youth sides of Paraná Clube at the age of eight. He signed his first professional contract with the club on 13 February 2007, and made his first team debut at the age of 17 on 12 April, coming on as a second-half substitute for Joelson in a 3–1 Campeonato Paranaense home loss to Coritiba, as his club was already qualified to the semifinals.

Giuliano made his Série A debut on 9 September 2007, replacing Everton late into a 1–0 home win over Corinthians. He scored his first professional goal on 10 November, netting his team's second in a 3–2 loss to Botafogo, and appeared in a further nine league matches during the season as his side suffered relegation.

Giuliano became a regular starter of Paraná during the 2008 season, and was elected the breakthrough player of the year's Série B.

=== Internacional ===
On 22 December 2008, Giuliano signed a five-year contract with Internacional, for a rumoured fee of R$ 2.5 million. He made his debut for the club on 15 February 2009, replacing Andrezinho in a 5–1 Campeonato Gaúcho home routing of Caxias.

Initially a backup option, Giuliano scored his first goal for the Colorado on 7 March 2009, netting his team's third in a 4–0 home routing of Veranópolis. Mainly a backup option, he became a regular starter in July, helping in the club's run which led them to the second position.

Giuliano scored six goals in Inter's 2010 Copa Libertadores winning campaign, including two goals in both legs of the finals against Guadalajara; he was also named the best player of the tournament in November.

=== Dnipro Dnipropetrovsk ===
On 20 January 2011, Inter officially announced the transfer of Giuliano to the Ukrainian side FC Dnipro Dnipropetrovsk, for a rumoured fee of € 10 million. Paraná Clube later submitted a claim to FIFA Dispute Resolution Chamber for overdue solidarity contribution of €275,000 and upheld by the arbitration.

Registered officially on 2 March 2011, Giuliano made his debut abroad four days later, starting in a 2–2 Ukrainian Premier League home draw against Tavriya Simferopol. He scored his first goal on 6 August, netting the opener in a 1–1 draw at Chornomorets Odesa.

After nearly moving to Grêmio in January 2012, Giuliano had his best inputs with Dnipro during the 2012–13 season, scoring 11 goals in 41 appearances overall.

=== Grêmio ===
On 15 June 2014, Giuliano was transferred to Grêmio for a rumoured fee of around €8 million, signing a contract until July 2018. Presented four days later, he made his debut for the club on 16 July, starting in a 0–0 home draw against Goiás.

Giuliano scored his first goal for the Tricolor on 19 July 2014, netting the winner in a 1–0 away success over Figueirense. Despite scoring only once in his first year, he became an undisputed starter during the 2015 season, netting 11 times.

=== Zenit Saint Petersburg ===
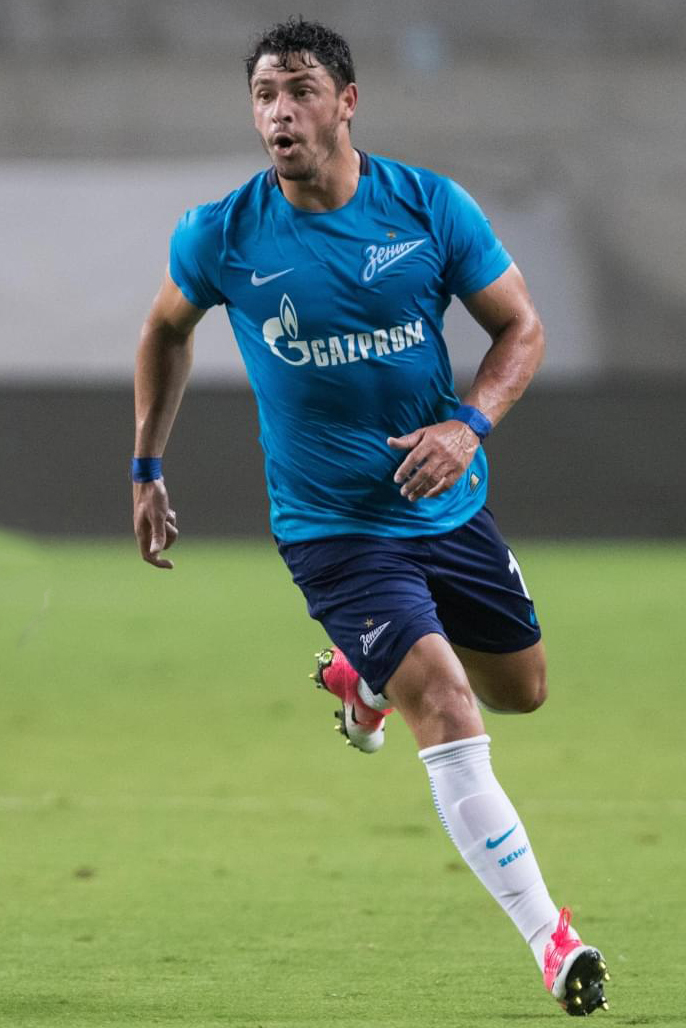
Giuliano with Zenit Saint Petersburg in 2017

On 21 July 2016, Giuliano was sold to the Russian club Zenit Saint Petersburg for €7 million. He was officially announced by his new club five days later, signing a four-year contract.

Giuliano made his debut for the club on 12 August 2016; after replacing Domenico Criscito at half-time, he scored his side's first through a penalty kick in a 3–2 home win over FC Rostov. He soon became a key unit at the Russian club, netting 17 goals across all competitions during the season, which included eight goals in just eight matches during the 2016–17 UEFA Europa League, where he finished as top scorer.

=== Fenerbahçe ===
On 12 August 2017, Turkish club Fenerbahçe announced the signing of Giuliano on a four-year contract. He scored a career-best 14 league goals with the club during his first season, with his side finishing second.

=== Al Nassr ===
On 20 August 2018, Fenerbahçe announced the transfer of Giuliano to Saudi club Al Nassr for €10.5 million. He was an undisputed starter during his two-year spell in Saudi Arabia, netting eight goals in the 2019 AFC Champions League.

Giuliano left Al Nassr on 29 September 2020, after having unpaid wages.

=== İstanbul Başakşehir ===
On 5 October 2020, Giuliano returned to the Turkish Süper Lig, joining İstanbul Başakşehir. Mainly a backup option under manager Okan Buruk, he only began to start in more matches under Aykut Kocaman.

On 2 July 2021, Giuliano terminated his contract with the club.

=== Corinthians ===
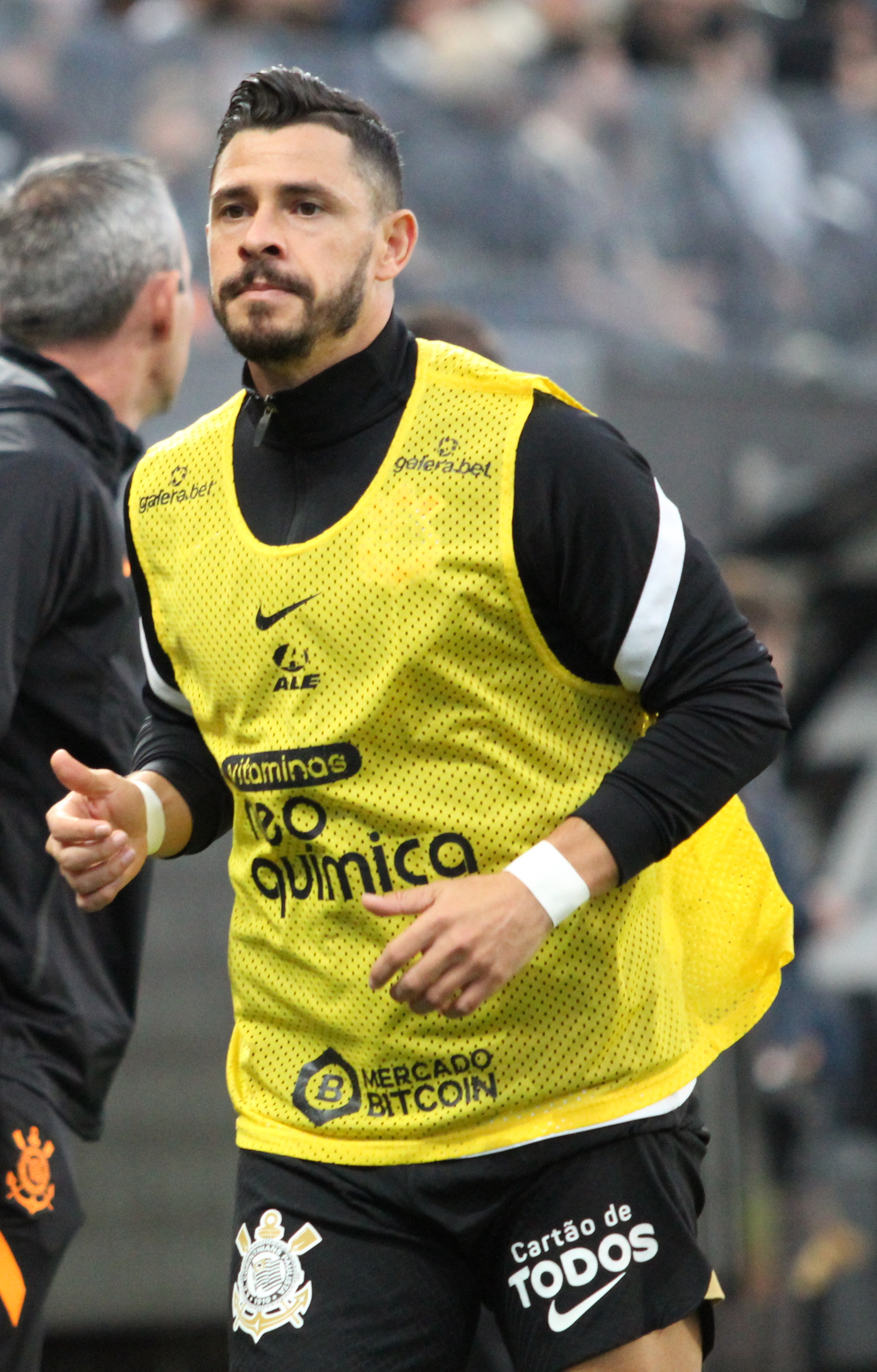
Giuliano with Corinthians in 2022

Giuliano returned to Brazil on 16 July 2021, signing a contract with Corinthians until the end of the 2023 season. He made his debut for the club on 8 August, starting in a 0–0 away draw against Santos, and scored his first goal on 19 September, netting the equalizer in a 1–1 home draw against América Mineiro.

Giuliano was also the top scorer of the 2022 Copa do Brasil while playing for the club, netting five goals. On 14 December 2023, Corinthians confirmed his departure from the club.

=== Santos ===
On 26 December 2023, Santos announced the signing of Giuliano on a one-year deal with an option for a further season. He made his debut for the club the following 20 January, starting in a 1–0 away win over Botafogo-SP.

Giuliano scored his first goals for the club on 25 January 2024, netting a brace in a 3–1 home win over Ponte Preta. Despite having an automatic one-year extension triggered at the end of the season, he rescinded his contract with the club on 15 January 2025.

=== Athletico Paranaense ===
On 31 January 2025, Giuliano signed a one-year deal with Athletico Paranaense, also in the second division.

=== Retirement ===
On 22 September 2026, Giuliano announced his retirement from playing.

== International career ==
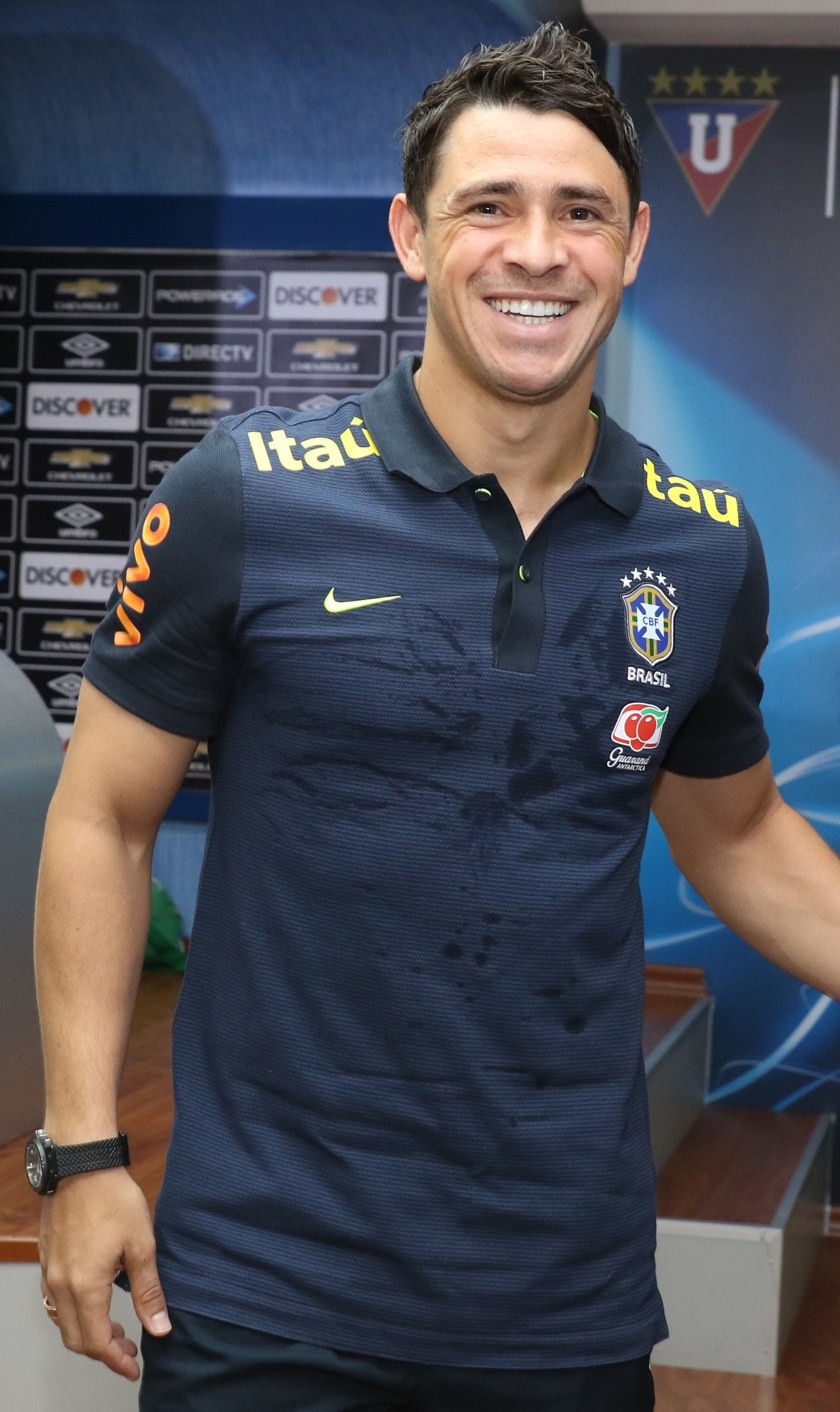
Giuliano with the Brazil national team in 2016

Giuliano featured with the Brazil under-17 team in the 2007 South American U-17 Championship, featuring in five matches during the competition. On 25 November 2008, he was called up to the under-20 team for the 2009 South American U-20 Championship, scoring twice during the tournament as Brazil lifted the trophy for the tenth time.

Giuliano also featured with the under-20 side in the 2009 FIFA U-20 World Cup, being team captain and winning the Bronze Ball as Brazil lost the final to Ghana on penalties. On 23 September 2010, he received his first call up to the full side by coach Mano Menezes, for two friendlies in October.

Giuliano made his full international debut on 7 October 2010, coming on as a second-half substitute for Carlos Eduardo in a 3–0 win against Iran at the Zayed Sports City Stadium in Abu Dhabi. He was placed on the preliminary squad for the 2012 Summer Olympics, but was cut from the final squad.

In May 2018, after featuring regularly in the call-ups during the qualifying stages, Giuliano was included in Tite's 35-man list for the 2018 FIFA World Cup. He did not get a place in the 23-man final list, however.

== Career statistics ==
=== Club ===
As of 18 November 2024

Appearances and goals by club, season and competition
Club	Season	League			State league (Note: Includes Campeonato Paranaense, Campeonato Gaúcho, Campeonato Paulista)		National cup (Note: Includes Copa do Brasil, Ukrainian Cup, Russian Cup, Turkish Cup, King's Cup)		Continental		Other		Total	
Club	Season	Division	Apps	Goals	Apps	Goals	Apps	Goals	Apps	Goals	Apps	Goals	Apps	Goals
Paraná	2007	Série A	10	1	1	0	0	0	—		—		11	1
Paraná	2008	Série B	30	5	20	2	6	1	—		—		56	8
Paraná	Total		40	6	21	1	6	1	—		—		67	8
Internacional	2009	Série A	27	5	10	1	2	0	—		2 (Note: One appearance in Recopa Sudamericana, one appearance in Suruga Bank Championship)	0	41	6
Internacional	2010	Série A	29	6	13	3	0	0	13 (Note: Appearances in Copa Libertadores)	6	2 (Note: Appearances in FIFA Club World Cup)	0	55	15
Internacional	Total		56	11	23	4	2	0	13	6	4	0	98	21
Dnipro Dnipropetrovsk	2010–11	Ukrainian Premier League	11	0	—		0	0	—		—		11	0
Dnipro Dnipropetrovsk	2011–12	Ukrainian Premier League	24	1	—		1	0	2 (Note: Appearances in UEFA Europa League)	0	—		27	1
Dnipro Dnipropetrovsk	2012–13	Ukrainian Premier League	28	9	—		3	1	10	1	—		41	11
Dnipro Dnipropetrovsk	2013–14	Ukrainian Premier League	24	6	—		0	0	5	1	—		29	7
Dnipro Dnipropetrovsk	Total		87	16	—		4	1	17	2	—		108	19
Grêmio	2014	Série A	17	1	—		1	0	—		—		18	1
Grêmio	2015	Série A	35	6	14	5	9	0	0	0	—		58	11
Grêmio	2016	Série A	15	4	9	3	0	0	8	0	—		32	7
Grêmio	Total		67	11	23	8	10	0	8	0	—		108	19
Zenit Saint Petersburg	2016–17	Russian Premier League	28	8	—		2	1	8	8	—		38	17
Zenit Saint Petersburg	2017–18	Russian Premier League	2	0	—		0	0	2	0	—		4	0
Zenit Saint Petersburg	Total		30	8	—		2	1	10	8	—		42	17
Fenerbahçe	2017–18	Süper Lig	30	14	—		4	1	0	0	—		34	15
Fenerbahçe	2018–19	Süper Lig	1	1	—		0	0	2 (Note: Appearances in UEFA Champions League)	0	—		3	1
Fenerbahçe	Total		31	15	—		4	1	2	0	—		37	16
Al-Nassr	2018–19	Saudi Pro League	30	8	—		5	3	9 (Note: Appearances in AFC Champions League)	8	0	0	44	19
Al-Nassr	2019–20	Saudi Pro League	28	11	—		4	2	2	0	1 (Note: Appearance in Saudi Super Cup)	0	35	13
Al-Nassr	Total		58	19	—		9	5	11	8	1	0	79	32
İstanbul Başakşehir	2020–21	Süper Lig	23	2	—		4	1	5	0	0	0	32	3
Corinthians	2021	Série A	21	3	—		—		—		—		21	3
Corinthians	2022	Série A	32	1	14	1	9	5	8	0	—		63	7
Corinthians	2023	Série A	30	2	13	0	5	0	11	0	—		59	2
Corinthians	Total		83	6	27	1	14	5	19	0	—		143	12
Santos	2024	Série B	29	9	7	3	—		—		—		36	12
Career total			488	97	101	18	54	15	83	24	5	0	731	154

=== International ===
As of 10 November 2017

Appearances and goals by national team and year
National team	Year	Apps	Goals
Brazil	2010	2	0
Brazil	2012	6	0
Brazil	2016	3	0
Brazil	2017	3	0
Total		14	0

== Honours ==
Internacional

- Copa Libertadores: 2010
- Suruga Bank Championship: 2009
- Campeonato Gaúcho: 2009

Al-Nassr

- Saudi Pro League: 2018–19
- Saudi Super Cup: 2019

Brazil U20

- South American Youth Championship: 2009

Santos

- Campeonato Brasileiro Série B: 2024

Individual

- Campeonato Brasileiro Série B Breakthrough Player: 2008
- FIFA U-20 World Cup Bronze Ball: 2009
- Copa Libertadores MVP: 2010
- Europa League Team of the Group Stage: 2016–17
- UEFA Europa League Top Scorer: 2016–17
