= Aleksandre Kobakhidze =

Georgian footballer

Aleksandr Kobakhidze
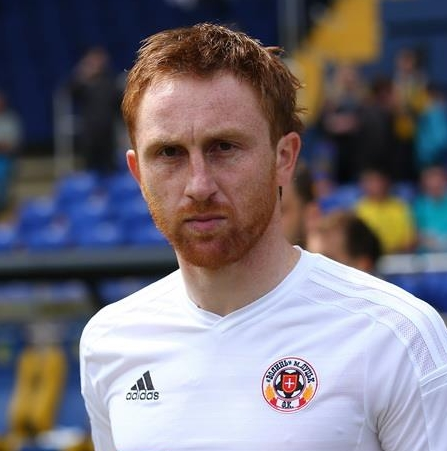
- Kobakhidze with Volyn Lutsk

Personal information
- Date of birth: 11 February 1987 (age 39)
- Place of birth: Tbilisi, Georgia
- Height: 1.83 m (6 ft 0 in)
- Position: Winger

Team information
- Current team: Locomotive Tbilisi
- Number: 30

Youth career
- 2000–2004: Dinamo Tbilisi

Senior career*
Years	Team	Apps	(Gls)
2004–2005	Spartaki Tbilisi	13	(0)
2006–2008	Dinamo Tbilisi	43	(7)
2008–2016	Dnipro	9	(1)
2009–2010	→ Kryvbas Kryvyi Rih (loan)	24	(0)
2011–2013	→ Arsenal Kyiv (loan)	42	(9)
2014–2016	→ Volyn Lutsk (loan)	36	(10)
2016–2017	Vorskla Poltava	17	(1)
2017	Göztepe	15	(0)
2017–2019	Vorskla Poltava	36	(3)
2019	Dnipro-1	2	(0)
2020–2021	Locomotive Tbilisi	8	(0)
2021–2022	Sioni Bolnisi	12	(1)
Total		245	(32)

International career^{‡}
2006–2007	Georgia U-19	3	(0)
2007–2008	Georgia U-21	9	(0)
2006–2018	Georgia	35	(3)
- * Club domestic league appearances and goals as of 28 February 2020 ‡ National team caps and goals as of 5 June 2017

Aleksandre "Sandro" Kobakhidze (Georgian: ალექსანდრე "სანდრო" კობახიძე, romanized: aleksandre "sandro" k'obakhidze, pronounced [alekʰsandɾe sandɾo kʼobaχidze]; born 11 February 1987) is a Georgian professional footballer who plays as a winger for Locomotive Tbilisi.

== Career ==
Kobakhidze played for Dnipro Dnipropetrovsk.

== Career statistics ==
#	Date	Venue	Opponent	Score	Result	Competition
1.	11 November 2011	Mikheil Meskhi Stadium, Tbilisi, Georgia	Moldova	1–0	2–0	Friendly
2.	29 February 2012	Mikheil Meskhi Stadium, Tbilisi, Georgia	Albania	1–1	2–1	Friendly
3.	22 March 2013	Stade de France, Saint-Denis	France	3–1	3–1	2014 FIFA World Cup Qualifier

== Honours ==
Dinamo Tbilisi

- Georgian First League: 2007–08
- Georgian Super Cup: 2008

Dnipro

- Ukrainian Second League: 2018–19

Sioni Bolnisi

- Georgian Second League: 2021
