= Yevhen Cheberyachko =

Ukrainian footballer

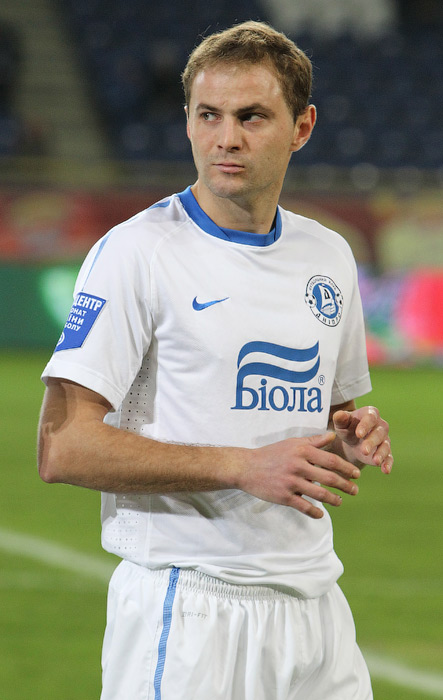

Personal information
- Full name: Yevhen Oleksandrovych Cheberyachko
- Date of birth: 19 June 1983 (age 43)
- Place of birth: Kyiv, Ukrainian SSR, Soviet Union
- Height: 1.80 m (5 ft 11 in)
- Position: Defender

Youth career
- 1998–1999: FC Dynamo Kyiv

Senior career*
Years	Team	Apps	(Gls)
1999–2002	FC Dynamo-3 Kyiv	52	(1)
2002–2003	FC CSKA Kyiv	28	(4)
2003–2004	FC Zakarpattia Uzhhorod	42	(2)
2005	FC Arsenal Kharkiv	15	(0)
2005–2008	FC Kharkiv	79	(4)
2009–2017	Dnipro	164	(3)
2017	Dnipro-1	2	(0)

International career^{‡}
2003–2006	Ukraine U21	27	(0)
2010–2011	Ukraine	2	(0)
Medal record
Men's football
Representing Ukraine
UEFA European Under-21 Championship
Runner-up	2006 Portugal
- * Club domestic league appearances and goals as of 11 September 2017 ‡ National team caps and goals as of 11 September 2017

Yevhen Oleksandrovych Cheberyachko (Ukrainian: Євген Олександрович Чеберячко; born 19 June 1983) is a Ukrainian retired professional footballer who played as a defender.

Cheberyachko was part of the Ukraine national under-21 football team that was runner-up of the 2006 UEFA European Under-21 Football Championship.

== Honors ==
FC Dnipro Dnipropetrovsk

- UEFA Europa League: runner-up 2014–15

Ukraine under-21

- UEFA Under-21 Championship: runner-up 2006
