= Vitaliy Mandzyuk =

Ukrainian footballer (born 1986)

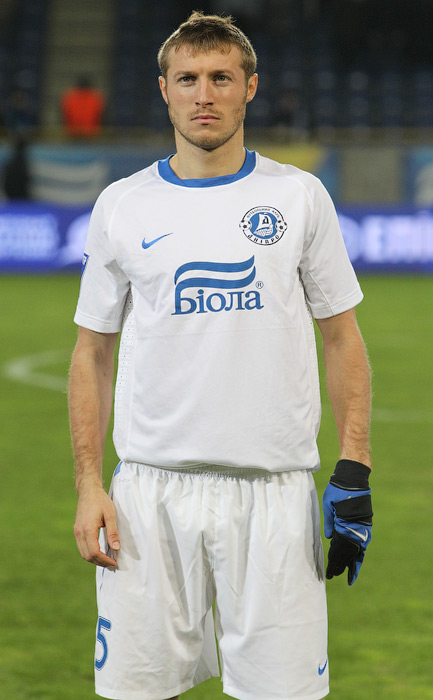
- Mandzyuk with Dnipro in 2011

Personal information
- Full name: Vitaliy Vasylyovych Mandzyuk
- Date of birth: 24 January 1986 (age 40)
- Place of birth: Viline, Bakhchysarai Raion, Crimea Oblast, Ukrainian SSR, Soviet Union
- Height: 1.80 m (5 ft 11 in)
- Positions: Centre-back; right-back

Team information
- Current team: Kolos Kovalivka (fitness coach)

Youth career
- 2000–2003: UOR Simferopol

Senior career*
Years	Team	Apps	(Gls)
2004–2009	Dynamo Kyiv	22	(0)
2004	→ Dynamo-3 Kyiv	11	(0)
2004–2008	→ Dynamo-2 Kyiv	51	(3)
2008	→ Arsenal Kyiv (loan)	15	(0)
2010–2016	Dnipro	94	(2)
Total		193	(5)

International career^{‡}
2004–2005	Ukraine U19	10	(0)
2006–2007	Ukraine U21	12	(1)
2008–2013	Ukraine	24	(1)

Managerial career
- 2020–: Kolos Kovalivka (fitness coach)
- * Club domestic league appearances and goals as of 30 March 2014 ‡ National team caps and goals as of 19 November 2013

Vitaliy Vasylyovych Mandzyuk (born 24 January 1986) is a Ukrainian former professional footballer who works as fitness coach for Ukrainian Premier League club Kolos Kovalivka. A defender, he played for Dynamo Kyiv, Dnipro Dnipropetrovsk and on loan for Arsenal Kyiv. He made 24 appearances for the Ukraine national team scoring one goal. He is the younger brother of Oleksandr Mandzyuk.

== Club career ==
=== Dynamo Kyiv ===
Mandzyuk was born in Vilino, Crimea, Ukrainian SSR. He started his professional football career with Dynamo Kyiv in 2004. Going into the 2007–08 season, Mandzyuk got injured, having to undergo a surgery. This prevented from him playing for the rest of the year 2007, but he recovered to play for the second half of the season.

In July 2008, Mandzyuk was loaned off to Arsenal Kyiv along with teammate Denys Oliynyk.

=== Dnipro Dnipropetrovsk ===
On 23 December 2009, Mandzyuk was sold to Dnipro for an undisclosed fee.

== International career ==
Mandzyuk was a regular member of the Ukraine U21 national team, and captained it on numerous occasions. On 23 August 2007, he scored the third goal in a friendly match victory against Moldova.

Mandzyuk was called up to the Ukraine senior team for a friendly against Cyprus on 6 February 2008. He was called up along with fellow club member Fedoriv by manager Oleksiy Mykhailychenko after the injury of mainstream defenders Dmytro Chyhrynskyi and Nesmachnyi.

== Honors ==
Dnipro Dnipropetrovsk

- UEFA Europa League runner-up: 2014–15
