= Matheus (footballer, born 1983) =

Brazilian footballer

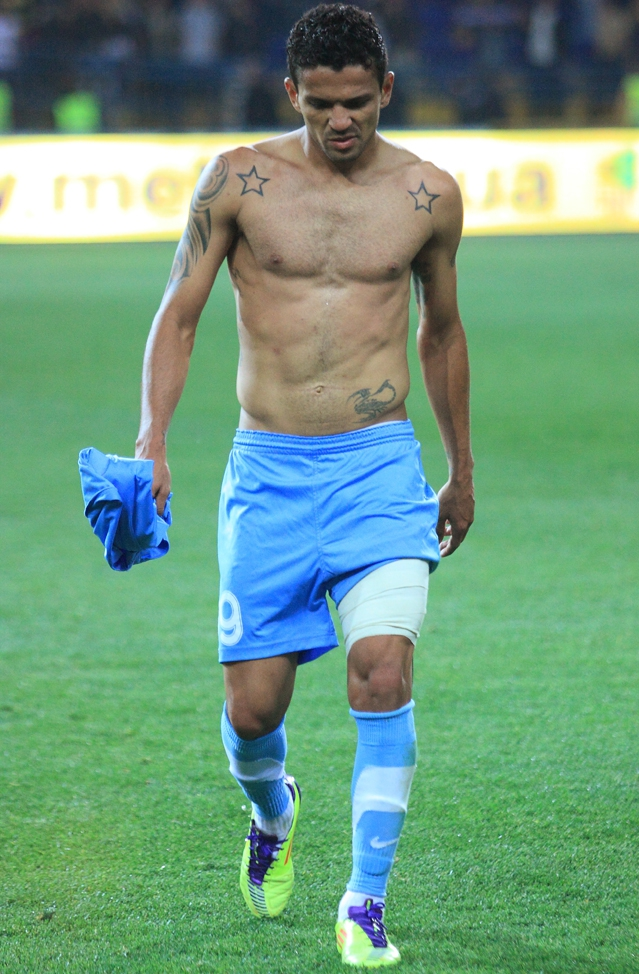
- Matheus after a game with Dnipro in 2012

Personal information
- Full name: Matheus Leite Nascimento
- Date of birth: 15 January 1983 (age 43)
- Place of birth: Ribeirópolis, Brazil
- Height: 1.75 m (5 ft 9 in)
- Position: Forward

Senior career*
Years	Team	Apps	(Gls)
2003–2005	Itabaiana		
2005	Marco	14	(4)
2006–2011	Braga	87	(9)
2007	→ Beira-Mar (loan)	14	(0)
2007	→ Vitória Setúbal (loan)	15	(5)
2011–2016	Dnipro	114	(35)
2016–2020	Shijiazhuang Ever Bright	107	(55)
2021–2022	Zhejiang Professional	43	(11)
2023	Itabaiana	12	(3)
2023	Sergipe	5	(0)
2024–2025	Itabaiana	4	(3)
Total		415	(120)
- * Club domestic league appearances and goals

Matheus Leite Nascimento (born 15 January 1983), known simply as Matheus, is a Brazilian former professional footballer who played as a forward.

He spent most of his career in Portugal with Braga and in Ukraine with Dnipro, appearing in 154 competitive games with the second club (48 goals).

== Club career ==
=== Early years and Braga ===
Matheus was born in Ribeirópolis, Sergipe. After starting professionally with lowly Associação Olímpica de Itabaiana, he moved to Portugal in summer 2005, with Liga de Honra team F.C. Marco. In January of the following year, however, he was bought by Primeira Liga's S.C. Braga, making four appearances in his first season.

During the year 2007, encompassing both the 2006–07 and 2007–08 campaigns, Matheus served two loans: in January 2007 he joined S.C. Beira-Mar, appearing from August–December with Vitória de Setúbal and being subsequently recalled by his parent club.

In 2009–10, Matheus played all 30 league matches – but rarely as a starter – as Braga finished in a best-ever second place behind S.L. Benfica. He contributed five goals, in 1,142 minutes of action.

Matheus started the following season with major contributions: on 28 July, he scored from a 35-meter free kick to close the score against Celtic (3–0 at home), as his team progressed to the next UEFA Champions League qualifying round (4–2 on aggregate). On 13 August, in the league opener against Portimonense SC, he started and opened the scoring in an eventual 3–1 home win. Five days later, again for the Champions League, he scored the game's only goal in a home victory over Sevilla FC– in celebrating the goal, he pulled out a pacifier and put it in his mouth– and netted the first in the second leg in Andalusia, in a 4–3 win (5–3 on aggregate).

On 23 November 2010, Matheus scored twice in the dying minutes of the 2–0 Champions League home defeat of Arsenal, although Braga would eventually fail to reach the knockout stages of the competition, finishing third in their group.

=== Dnipro ===
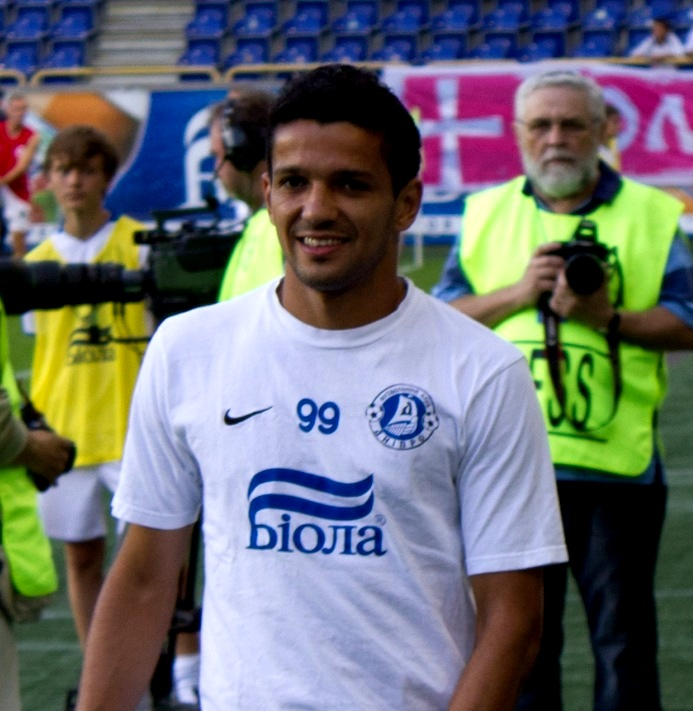
Matheus in October 2011

In January 2011, the 28-year-old Matheus signed for FC Dnipro Dnipropetrovsk in Ukraine, for €1 million. He finished his first full season with seven goals from 23 appearances, helping his team to the fourth position. On 15 April 2014, he netted four times in their 5–1 home win against FC Volyn Lutsk.

During the 2015 UEFA Europa League Final in Warsaw, Matheus collapsed on the field of play in the late stages of the team's 3–2 loss to Sevilla. Manager Myron Markevych confirmed that he had been treated at hospital for a nasal fracture and a head injury, being discharged in good health hours later to reunite with his teammates.

=== China ===
On 12 June 2016, Matheus was supposed to join Super League Greece club PAOK FC on a free transfer, signing alongside teammates Léo Matos and Evhen Shakhov. However, the deal fell through and he moved to Shijiazhuang Ever Bright F.C. instead, on a two-year contract.

Relegated in his first season, Matheus remained with the side in China League One, winning promotion back to the Super League in 2019. The following 11 September, on his 100th competitive game, he scored a penalty for the only goal at home to Wuhan Zall FC.

Matheus left five years later as a free agent, but continued in the country with second-tier Zhejiang Professional FC. He earned another promotion at the end of the 2021 campaign.

=== Later career ===
On 24 January 2023, aged 40, Matheus returned to Itabaiana after eighteen years. He changed clubs again only three months later, signing for Club Sportivo Sergipe in the Campeonato Brasileiro Série D.

== International career ==
In March 2013, after more than two years of living in the country, Matheus indicated that he would be likely to accept a call-up for the Ukraine national team if asked.

== Career statistics ==
Appearances and goals by club, season and competition
Club	Season	League			State League		National Cup		League Cup		Continental		Other		Total	
Club	Season	Division	Apps	Goals	Apps	Goals	Apps	Goals	Apps	Goals	Apps	Goals	Apps	Goals	Apps	Goals
Itabaiana	2003	—	—				—		—		—		—			
Itabaiana	2004	—	—				—		—		—		—			
Itabaiana	2005	—	—				—		—		—		—			
Itabaiana	Total		—				—		—		—		—			
Marco	2005–06	Liga de Honra	14	4	—		0	0	—		—		—		14	4
Braga	2005–06	Primeira Liga	4	0	—		0	0	—		0	0	—		4	0
Braga	2006–07	Primeira Liga	4	0	—		0	0	—		1	0	—		5	0
Braga	2007–08	Primeira Liga	10	1	—		0	0	0	0	2	0	—		12	1
Braga	2008–09	Primeira Liga	26	1	—		1	0	2	1	10	2	—		39	4
Braga	2009–10	Primeira Liga	30	5	—		4	2	3	1	2	0	—		39	8
Braga	2010–11	Primeira Liga	13	2	—		0	0	0	0	10	6	—		23	8
Braga	Total		87	9	—		5	2	5	2	25	8	—		122	21
Beira-Mar (loan)	2006–07	Primeira Liga	14	0	—		4	0	—		—		—		18	0
Vitória Setúbal (loan)	2007–08	Primeira Liga	15	0	—		2	1	3	2	—		—		20	3
Dnipro	2010–11	Ukrainian Premier League	3	0	—		0	0	—		0	0	—		3	0
Dnipro	2011–12	Ukrainian Premier League	23	7	—		1	1	—		0	0	—		24	8
Dnipro	2012–13	Ukrainian Premier League	28	6	—		4	3	—		9	3	—		41	12
Dnipro	2013–14	Ukrainian Premier League	29	13	—		0	0	—		6	1	—		35	14
Dnipro	2014–15	Ukrainian Premier League	8	2	—		1	0	—		8	0	—		17	2
Dnipro	2015–16	Ukrainian Premier League	23	7	—		5	3	—		6	2	—		34	12
Dnipro	Total		114	35	—		11	7	—		29	6	—		154	48
Shijiazhuang Ever Bright	2016	Chinese Super League	16	8	—		0	0	—		—		—		16	8
Shijiazhuang Ever Bright	2017	China League One	26	14	—		1	0	—		—		—		27	14
Shijiazhuang Ever Bright	2018	China League One	24	14	—		0	0	—		—		—		24	14
Shijiazhuang Ever Bright	2019	China League One	23	13	—		0	0	—		—		—		23	13
Shijiazhuang Ever Bright	2020	Chinese Super League	18	6	—		0	0	—		—		—		18	6
Shijiazhuang Ever Bright	Total		107	55	—		1	0	—		—		—		108	55
Zhejiang Professional	2021	China League One	20	6	—		0	0	—		—		2 (Note: Appearances in Chinese Super League relegation play-offs)	0	22	6
Zhejiang Professional	2022	Chinese Super League	23	5	—		1	0	—		—		—		24	5
Zhejiang Professional	Total		43	11	—		1	0	—		—		2	0	46	11
Itabaiana	2023	Sergipano	—		12	3	—		—		—		—		12	3
Sergipe	2023	Série D	5	0	—		—		—		—		—		5	0
Itabaiana	2024	Série D	0	0	3	2	1	0	—		—		7	2	11	4
Itabaiana	2025	Sergipano	—		1	1	—		—		—		—		1	1
Itabaiana	Total		0	0	4	3	1	0	—		—		7	2	12	5
Career total			399	114	16	6	25	10	8	4	54	14	9	2	506	150

== Honours ==
Braga

- UEFA Intertoto Cup: 2008
- UEFA Europa League runner-up: 2010–11

Dnipro

- UEFA Europa League runner-up: 2014–15

Individual

- China League One Most Valuable Player: 2017
