= Ihor Vartsaba =

Ukrainian footballer

Personal information
- Full name: Ihor Petrovych Vartsaba
- Date of birth: 28 January 1991 (age 35)
- Place of birth: Dnipropetrovsk, Soviet Union (now Ukraine)
- Height: 1.84 m (6 ft 0 in)
- Position: Goalkeeper

Team information
- Current team: Poltava
- Number: 1

Youth career
- 2004–2007: Dnipro Dnipropetrovsk

Senior career*
Years	Team	Apps	(Gls)
2012–2016	Dnipro Dnipropetrovsk	2	(0)
2015	→ Naftovyk-Ukrnafta Okhtyrka (loan)	2	(0)
2017–2018	Dnipro-1	11	(0)
2018–2019	Metalurh Zaporizhzhia	25	(0)
2020	Peremoha Dnipro	9	(0)
2021–2023	Skoruk Tomakivka	29	(0)
2023–	Poltava	26	(0)

International career^{‡}
2007–2008	Ukraine U17	2	(0)
2008–2009	Ukraine U18	2	(0)
2011	Ukraine U20	1	(0)
- * Club domestic league appearances and goals as of 1 June 2024 ‡ National team caps and goals as of 11 December 2015

Ihor Petrovych Vartsaba (Ukrainian: Ігор Петрович Варцаба; born 28 January 1991) is a Ukrainian professional football goalkeeper who plays for Poltava.
