= Denys Shelikhov =

Ukrainian footballer (born 1989)

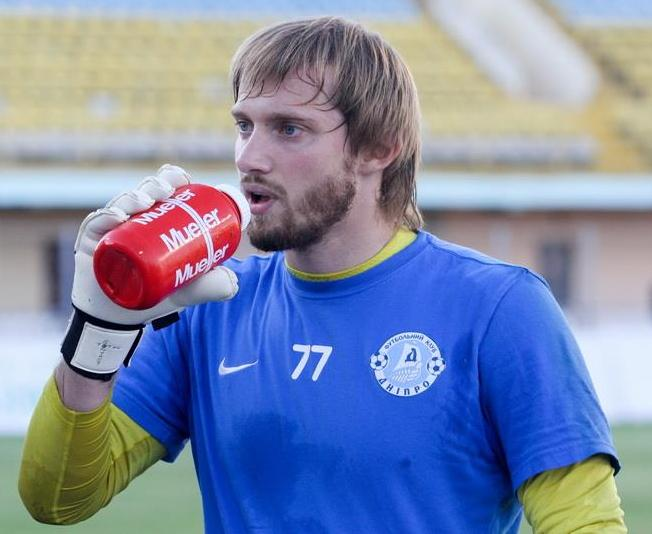

Personal information
- Full name: Denys Vasylyovych Shelikhov
- Date of birth: 23 June 1989 (age 37)
- Place of birth: Kherson, Soviet Union (now Ukraine)
- Height: 1.88 m (6 ft 2 in)
- Position: Goalkeeper

Team information
- Current team: Naftan Novopolotsk

Youth career
- 2003: Systema-Borex Borodianka

Senior career*
Years	Team	Apps	(Gls)
2006–2017	Dnipro Dnipropetrovsk	11	(0)
2009	→ Dnipro-75 Dnipropetrovsk (loan)	13	(0)
2012	→ Volyn Lutsk (loan)	8	(0)
2013	→ Volyn Lutsk (loan)	0	(0)
2017	Isloch Minsk Raion	9	(0)
2018	Luch Minsk	16	(0)
2019	Saburtalo Tbilisi	1	(0)
2020	Mykolaiv	6	(0)
2020–2021	VPK-Ahro Shevchenkivka	16	(0)
2021–2022	Metalist 1925 Kharkiv	1	(0)
2022–2023	LNZ Cherkasy	2	(0)
2023–2024	Viktoriya Sumy	10	(0)
2024–2026	Slavia Mozyr	0	(0)
2026–	Naftan Novopolotsk	2	(0)

International career
2009	Ukraine U21	1	(0)
- * Club domestic league appearances and goals as of 15 August 2026

Denys Vasylyovych Shelikhov (Ukrainian: Денис Васильович Шеліхов; born 23 June 1989) is a Ukrainian professional footballer who plays as goalkeeper for Naftan Novopolotsk.

== Honours ==
Saburtalo Tbilisi

- Georgian Super Cup runner-up: 2019

Dnipro Dnipropetrovsk

- UEFA Europa League runner-up: 2014–15
