= Douglas (footballer, born April 1990) =

Brazilian footballer

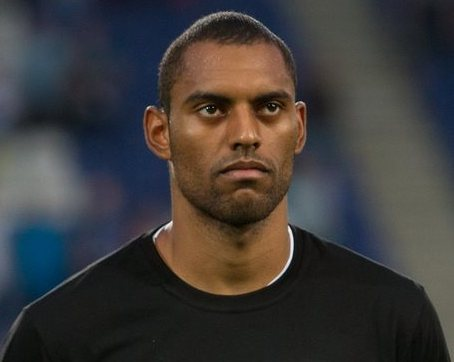
- Douglas in 2014

Personal information
- Full name: Douglas Silva Bacelar
- Date of birth: 4 April 1990 (age 36)
- Place of birth: São Paulo, Brazil
- Height: 1.90 m (6 ft 3 in)
- Position: Centre-back

Team information
- Current team: Guarani
- Number: 23

Youth career
- Juventude

Senior career*
| Years | Team | Apps | (Gls) |
| 2009–2010 | Juventude | 23 | (1) |
| 2010 | América-RN | 4 | (0) |
| 2010–2012 | Vasco da Gama | 32 | (1) |
| 2013–2016 | Dnipro Dnipropetrovsk | 50 | (1) |
| 2016–2019 | São Paulo | 1 | (0) |
| 2017–2018 | → Chapecoense (loan) | 24 | (1) |
| 2018–2020 | Chapecoense | 49 | (0) |
| 2020–2021 | Dnipro-1 | 17 | (2) |
| 2021–2022 | Giresunspor | 10 | (0) |
| 2023 | Inter de Limeira | 9 | (0) |
| 2023–2024 | Avaí | 23 | (2) |
| 2024– | Guarani | 1 | (0) |
- * Club domestic league appearances and goals as of 22 April 2024

Douglas Silva Bacelar (born 4 April 1990), simply known as Douglas, is a Brazilian professional footballer who plays as a central defender for Guarani.

== Career ==
=== Juventude ===
Douglas made his league debut against Sapucaiense on 20 January 2009. He scored his first goal for the club against Guarani FC on 28 November 2009, scoring in the 62nd minute.

=== América-RN ===
Douglas made his league debut against Bahia on 8 May 2010.

=== Vasco da Gama ===
Douglas made his league debut against Corinthians on 28 November 2010. In the Copa Sudamericana, he scored the seventh goal against Aurora, helping qualify them for the next round.

=== Dnipro Dnipropetrovsk ===
In January 2013, Douglas moved to Dnipro Dnipropetrovsk on a five-year deal from CR Vasco da Gama. He made his league debut against Arsenal Kyiv on 2 March 2013. Douglas scored his first league goal against Vorskla Poltava on 27 October 2013, scoring in the 39th minute.

Douglas was part of the team that were runners-up in the Europa League.

=== São Paulo ===
Douglas was projected to join São Paulo. He made his league debut against Osasco Audax on 5 February 2017.

=== Loan to Chapecoense ===
Douglas went on loan to Chapecoense. He made his league debut against Ponte Preta on 24 September 2017. Douglas scored his first goal for the club against Avaí on 1 April 2018, scoring in the 38th minute.

=== Dnipro-1 ===
Douglas made his league debut against Olimpik Donetsk on 12 September 2020. He scored his first goal for the club against Inhulets on 14 February 2021, scoring in the 11th minute.

=== Giresunspor ===
Douglas made his league debut against Galatasaray on 16 August 2021.

=== Inter de Limeira ===
Douglas made his league debut against São Bernardo on 14 January 2023.

=== Avaí ===
Douglas made his league debut against Ponte Preta on 8 July 2023. He scored his first goal for the club against Mirassol on 1 August 2023, scoring in the 90th+1st minute.

== Honours ==
Dnipro Dnipropetrovsk

- UEFA Europa League: runner-up 2014–15

Individual

- UEFA Europa League Squad of the season: 2014–15
