= Dnipro-Arena =

Football stadium in Dnipro, Ukraine

Coordinates: 48°27′37″N 35°1′57″E

Dnipro Arena
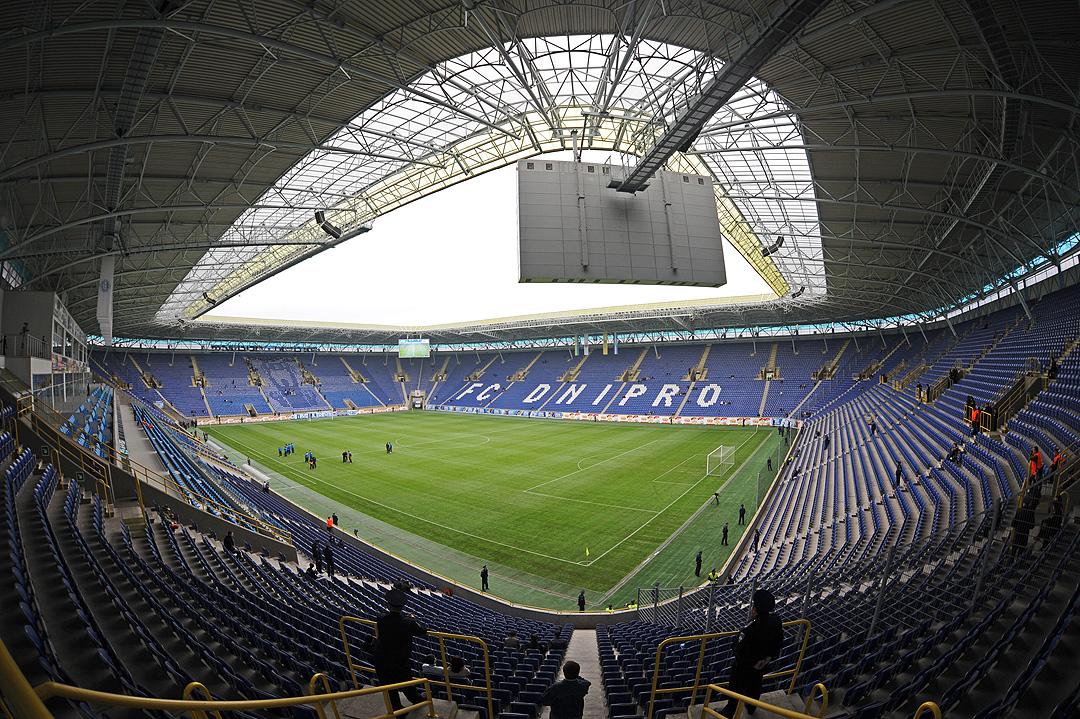
- UEFA Category 4 Stadium
- Interactive map of Dnipro Arena
- Location: Dnipro, Ukraine
- Owner: PrivatBank
- Capacity: 31,003
- Surface: Grass
- Field size: 105 m × 70 m (344 ft × 230 ft)

Construction
- Groundbreaking: April 1, 2005
- Opened: 14 September 2008; 18 years ago
- Cost: €40,000,000
- Architect: Hochtief

Tenants
- FC Dnipro (2008–2019); SC Dnipro-1 (2019–2024)

The Dnipro Arena (Ukrainian: Дніпро-Арена) is a football stadium in Dnipro, Ukraine. It is used mostly for football matches. The stadium has a capacity of 31,003 people. It was built on the site of FC Dnipro's old Soviet Metalurh Stadium which had existed since 1940, although the club had played their home games at Meteor Stadium from 1966 onwards.

== History ==
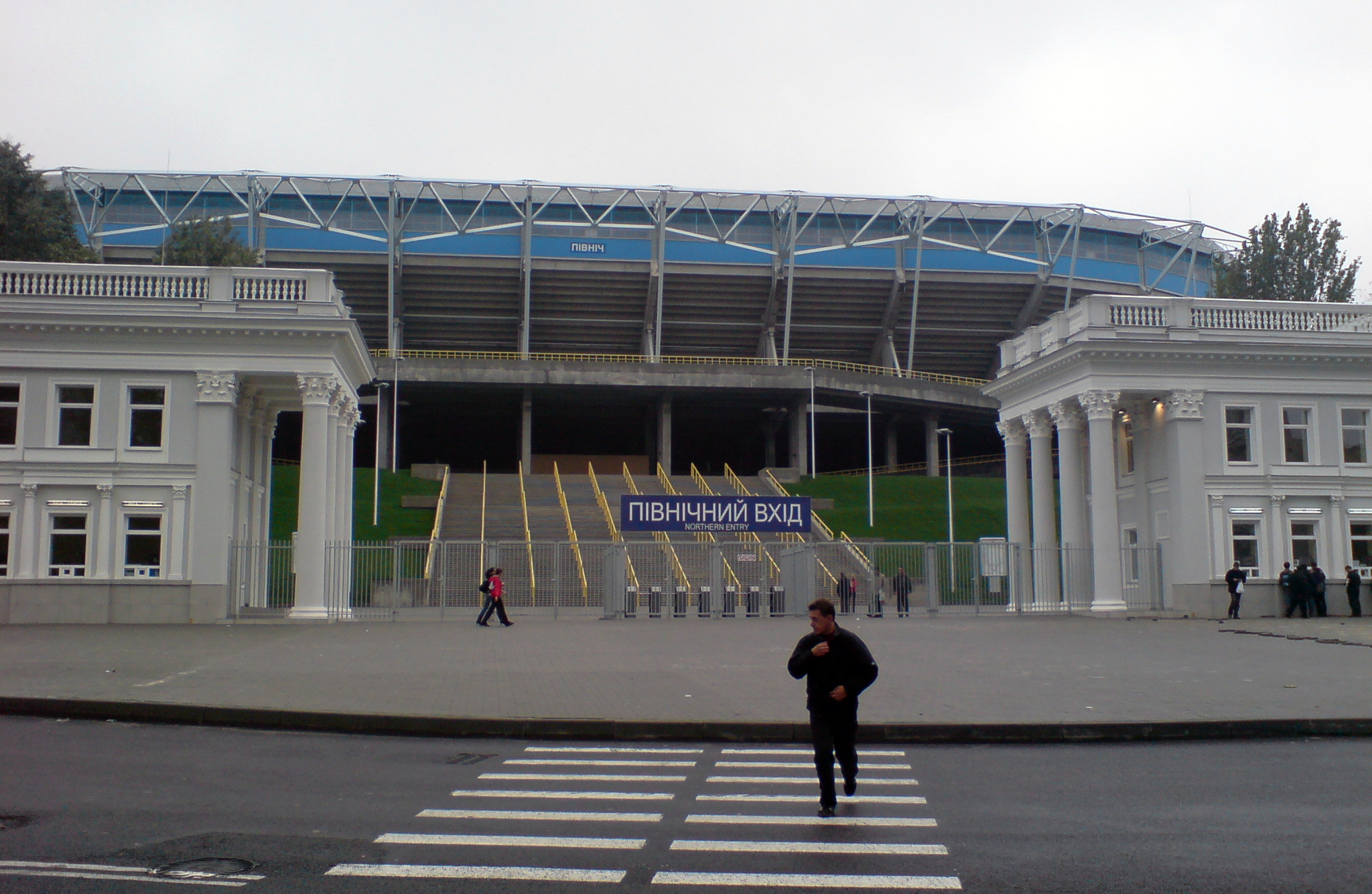
North entrance of the stadium

In October 2009, The Dnipro-Arena staged the 2010 FIFA World Cup qualifying match between Ukraine and England as the Olimpiysky National Sports Complex in Kyiv was being rebuilt ready for UEFA Euro 2012.

The Dnipro-Arena was chosen as a possible venue for UEFA Euro 2012 but was dropped from the list in May 2009. The capacity fell short of the minimum 33,000 seats required by UEFA.

Dnipro-Arena hosted the 2009 Ukrainian Cup final, in which Vorskla Poltava beat Shakhtar Donetsk 1–0.

Owing to the beginning of the War in Donbas, FC Dnipro began to play their European matches at the Olympiskiy NSC Stadium in Kyiv at the behest of UEFA, beginning with their 2014/15 Europa League campaign in which they would go on to reach the final. This was despite the fact that there had been comparatively less conflict in Dnipro than in other areas. This arrangement would only continue for one more season, however, as FC Dnipro were banned from participating in UEFA competitions from 2016 onwards.

The original main tenant, FC Dnipro, was disbanded in 2019 due to bankruptcy. Its unofficial successor, SC Dnipro-1, also collapsed and withdrew from professional football in July 2024. As a result, the stadium was put up for auction in October 2025, although this auction did not take place and the stadium now remains without a tenant.

== See also ==
- PEOPLEnet Cup
