= List of Ukrainian football transfers winter 2011–12 =

This is a list of Ukrainian football transfers in the winter transfer window 2011–12 by club. Only transfers of the Premier League are included.

== Premier League ==
=== FC Arsenal Kyiv ( (Belarus) Leonid Kuchuk) ===
In: Note: Flags indicate national team as defined under FIFA eligibility rules; some limited exceptions apply. Players may hold more than one non-FIFA nationality.

No.	Pos.	Nation	Player
--	DF	BRA	Leandro da Silva (free agent from Spartak Nalchik)
--	FW	GHA	Dominic Adiyiah (on loan from Milan)

Out: Note: Flags indicate national team as defined under FIFA eligibility rules; some limited exceptions apply. Players may hold more than one non-FIFA nationality.

No.	Pos.	Nation	Player
--	MF	UKR	Oleksandr Hrytsai (free agent to Zorya Luhansk)

=== FC Chornomorets Odesa ( (Ukraine) Roman Hryhorchuk) ===
In: Note: Flags indicate national team as defined under FIFA eligibility rules; some limited exceptions apply. Players may hold more than one non-FIFA nationality.

No.	Pos.	Nation	Player
--	DF	AUT	Markus Berger (from Académica)
--	FW	ESP	Sito Riera (from Panionios F.C.)
--	DF	BRA	Léo Veloso (from Căile Ferate Române)

Out: Note: Flags indicate national team as defined under FIFA eligibility rules; some limited exceptions apply. Players may hold more than one non-FIFA nationality.

No.	Pos.	Nation	Player
--	MF	UKR	Ruslan Solyanyk (free agent)
--	MF	UKR	Artur Kaskov (loan return to Metalurh Zaporizhia)
--	FW	BRA	Jymmy França (loan returnto Sheriff Tiraspol)
--	DF	UKR	Valeriy Sokolenko (free agent)

=== FC Dnipro Dnipropetrovsk ( (Spain) Juande Ramos) ===
In: Note: Flags indicate national team as defined under FIFA eligibility rules; some limited exceptions apply. Players may hold more than one non-FIFA nationality.

No.	Pos.	Nation	Player
--	DF	CZE	Ondřej Mazuch (from R.S.C. Anderlecht)
--	MF	UKR	Yevhen Baryshnikov (loan return from Kryvbas)
--	DF	UKR	Vitaliy Fedoriv (from Amkar)
--	MF	CRO	Antonio Jakoliš (from Šibenik)

Out: Note: Flags indicate national team as defined under FIFA eligibility rules; some limited exceptions apply. Players may hold more than one non-FIFA nationality.

No.	Pos.	Nation	Player
--	MF	CZE	Mario Holek (to Sparta Prague)
--	MF	UKR	Dmytro Lepa (loan to Kryvbas)
--	FW	UKR	Oleksiy Antonov (loan to Kryvbas)
--	DF	UKR	Vitaliy Fedoriv (loan to Kryvbas)
--	MF	UKR	Yevhen Baryshnikov (loan to Naftovyk)
--	FW	UKR	Oleksandr Hladky (loan to Karpaty)

=== FC Dynamo Kyiv ( (Russia) Yuri Semin) ===
In: Note: Flags indicate national team as defined under FIFA eligibility rules; some limited exceptions apply. Players may hold more than one non-FIFA nationality.

No.	Pos.	Nation	Player
--	FW	SUI	Admir Mehmedi (from FC Zürich)
--	GK	UKR	Denys Boyko (loan return from Kryvbas)
--	MF	ROU	Cătălin Carp (free agent)
--	DF	MAR	Badr El Kaddouri (loan return from Celtic)

Out: Note: Flags indicate national team as defined under FIFA eligibility rules; some limited exceptions apply. Players may hold more than one non-FIFA nationality.

No.	Pos.	Nation	Player
--	FW	BRA	Gérson Magrão (contact breach)
--	FW	NGA	Fanendo Adi (loan return to Metalurh Donetsk)
--	GK	UKR	Denys Boyko (loan to Kryvbas)
--	GK	UKR	Artem Kychak (loan to Oleksandria)
--	MF	FRA	Chakhir Belghazouani (to Zulte)

=== FC Illichivets Mariupol ( (Ukraine) Ihor Leonov) ===
In: Note: Flags indicate national team as defined under FIFA eligibility rules; some limited exceptions apply. Players may hold more than one non-FIFA nationality.

No.	Pos.	Nation	Player
--	MF	LVA	Ritvars Rugins (from FK Ventspils)
--	MF	GEO	David Targamadze (on loan from Shakhtar Donetsk)
—	GK	UKR	Rustam Khudzhamov (on loan from Shakhtar Donetsk)
--	DF	UKR	Artem Sukhotskyi (free agent)
--	DF	UKR	Serhiy Shevchuk (from Shakhtar)
--	DF	UKR	Serhiy Yavorskyi (from Shakhtar)

Out: Note: Flags indicate national team as defined under FIFA eligibility rules; some limited exceptions apply. Players may hold more than one non-FIFA nationality.

No.	Pos.	Nation	Player
--	DF	UKR	Artur Zapadnya (to Vorskla)
--	GK	UKR	Bohdan Shust (loan return to Shakhtar)
--	MF	UKR	Vladyslav Nasibulin (loan to Nizhny Novgorod)
--	DF	UKR	Stanislav Mykytsey (loan to Nizhny Novgorod)

=== FC Karpaty Lviv ( (Ukraine) Volodymyr Sharan) ===
In: Note: Flags indicate national team as defined under FIFA eligibility rules; some limited exceptions apply. Players may hold more than one non-FIFA nationality.

No.	Pos.	Nation	Player
--	MF	GEO	Murtaz Daushvili (from FC Zestaponi)

Out: Note: Flags indicate national team as defined under FIFA eligibility rules; some limited exceptions apply. Players may hold more than one non-FIFA nationality.

No.	Pos.	Nation	Player
--	GK	BRA	Murilo (loan return to Bragantino)
--	FW	UKR	Serhiy Kuznetsov (free agent)

=== FC Kryvbas Kryvyi Rih ( (Ukraine) Yuriy Maksymov) ===
In: Note: Flags indicate national team as defined under FIFA eligibility rules; some limited exceptions apply. Players may hold more than one non-FIFA nationality.

No.	Pos.	Nation	Player
--	MF	UKR	Dmytro Lepa (loan from Dnipro)

Out: Note: Flags indicate national team as defined under FIFA eligibility rules; some limited exceptions apply. Players may hold more than one non-FIFA nationality.

No.	Pos.	Nation	Player
--	GK	UKR	Denys Boyko (loan return to Dynamo)
--	MF	UKR	Serhiy Danylovskyi (free agent)

=== FC Metalist Kharkiv ( (Ukraine) Myron Markevych) ===
In: Note: Flags indicate national team as defined under FIFA eligibility rules; some limited exceptions apply. Players may hold more than one non-FIFA nationality.

No.	Pos.	Nation	Player
--	MF	BRA	Marlos (from São Paulo)

Out: Note: Flags indicate national team as defined under FIFA eligibility rules; some limited exceptions apply. Players may hold more than one non-FIFA nationality.

No.	Pos.	Nation	Player

=== FC Metalurh Donetsk ( (Ukraine) Volodymyr Pyatenko) ===
In: Note: Flags indicate national team as defined under FIFA eligibility rules; some limited exceptions apply. Players may hold more than one non-FIFA nationality.

No.	Pos.	Nation	Player
--	FW	NGA	Fanendo Adi (loan return from Dynamo Kyiv)
--	MF	NED	Gregory Nelson (from CSKA Sofia)
--	MF	UKR	Oleh Mishchenko (loan return from Hoverla)
--	GK	UKR	Dmytro Nepohodov (loan return from Banants Yerevan)

Out: Note: Flags indicate national team as defined under FIFA eligibility rules; some limited exceptions apply. Players may hold more than one non-FIFA nationality.

No.	Pos.	Nation	Player
--	FW	NGA	Fanendo Adi (to Tavriya Simferopol)
--	MF	POR	Ricardo Fernandes (free agent)

=== FC Obolon Kyiv ( (Ukraine) Serhiy Konyushenko) ===
In: Note: Flags indicate national team as defined under FIFA eligibility rules; some limited exceptions apply. Players may hold more than one non-FIFA nationality.

No.	Pos.	Nation	Player
--	MF	UKR	Serhiy Kucherenko (loan return from Hoverla)

Out: Note: Flags indicate national team as defined under FIFA eligibility rules; some limited exceptions apply. Players may hold more than one non-FIFA nationality.

No.	Pos.	Nation	Player

=== PFC Oleksandriya ( (Ukraine) Leonid Buryak) ===
In: Note: Flags indicate national team as defined under FIFA eligibility rules; some limited exceptions apply. Players may hold more than one non-FIFA nationality.

No.	Pos.	Nation	Player
--	FW	BUL	Dimitar Makriev (from Krylia Sovetov)
--	DF	BUL	Viktor Genev (from Krylia Sovetov)

Out: Note: Flags indicate national team as defined under FIFA eligibility rules; some limited exceptions apply. Players may hold more than one non-FIFA nationality.

No.	Pos.	Nation	Player
--	MF	GEO	David Targamadze (to Shakhtar Donetsk)

=== FC Shakhtar Donetsk ( (Romania) Mircea Lucescu) ===
In: Note: Flags indicate national team as defined under FIFA eligibility rules; some limited exceptions apply. Players may hold more than one non-FIFA nationality.

No.	Pos.	Nation	Player
--	MF	GEO	David Targamadze (to Shakhtar Donetsk)
—	GK	UKR	Bohdan Shust (to Shakhtar Donetsk)

Out: Note: Flags indicate national team as defined under FIFA eligibility rules; some limited exceptions apply. Players may hold more than one non-FIFA nationality.

No.	Pos.	Nation	Player
--	MF	GEO	David Targamadze (on loan to Illichivets Mariupol)
--	FW	BOL	Marcelo Martins Moreno (to Grêmio)
—	GK	UKR	Rustam Khudzhamov (on loan to Illichivets Mariupol)
—	MF	BRA	Jádson (to São Paulo FC)

=== SC Tavriya Simferopol ( (Ukraine) Semen Altman) ===
In: Note: Flags indicate national team as defined under FIFA eligibility rules; some limited exceptions apply. Players may hold more than one non-FIFA nationality.

No.	Pos.	Nation	Player
--	FW	NGA	Fanendo Adi (from Metalurh Donetsk)
--	MF	UKR	Oleksandr Kablash (loan return from Bukovyna Chernivtsi)
--	DF	TUN	Anis Boussaidi (from FC Rostov)
--	MF	CIV	Marco Né (from Kuban Krasnodar)
--	DF	NGA	Mohammed Goyi Aliyu (from Villarreal CF)

Out: Note: Flags indicate national team as defined under FIFA eligibility rules; some limited exceptions apply. Players may hold more than one non-FIFA nationality.

No.	Pos.	Nation	Player
--	FW	UKR	Oleksandr Pyschur (free agent to Volyn Lutsk)
--	MF	UKR	Ilya Galuza (from Tavriya Simferopol)
—	FW	NGA	Lucky Idahor (free agent)
--	DF	UKR	Anton Monakhov (free agent)
--	DF	CRO	Saša Đuričić (free agent)
--	DF	UKR	Ivan Hraf (free agent)
--	DF	UKR	Petro Oparin (free agent)
--	MF	UKR	Andriy Kornev (free agent)
--	DF	SRB	Slobodan Marković (free agent)
--	FW	GEO	Vasil Gigiadze (free agent)

=== FC Volyn Lutsk ( (Ukraine) Anatoliy Demyanenko) ===
In: Note: Flags indicate national team as defined under FIFA eligibility rules; some limited exceptions apply. Players may hold more than one non-FIFA nationality.

No.	Pos.	Nation	Player
--	FW	UKR	Oleksandr Pyschur (free agent from Tavriya Simferopol)

Out: Note: Flags indicate national team as defined under FIFA eligibility rules; some limited exceptions apply. Players may hold more than one non-FIFA nationality.

No.	Pos.	Nation	Player
--	MF	SVN	Dalibor Stevanovič (free agent)
--	MF	UKR	Roman Maksymyuk (retired)

=== FC Vorskla Poltava ( (Ukraine) Mykola Pavlov) ===
In: Note: Flags indicate national team as defined under FIFA eligibility rules; some limited exceptions apply. Players may hold more than one non-FIFA nationality.

No.	Pos.	Nation	Player

Out: Note: Flags indicate national team as defined under FIFA eligibility rules; some limited exceptions apply. Players may hold more than one non-FIFA nationality.

No.	Pos.	Nation	Player
--	MF	UKR	Serhiy Zakarlyuka (free agent)
--	MF	BLR	Dzmitry Asipenka (free agent)
--	DF	UKR	Pavlo Leshko (free agent)

=== FC Zorya Luhansk ( (Ukraine) Yuriy Vernydub) ===
In: Note: Flags indicate national team as defined under FIFA eligibility rules; some limited exceptions apply. Players may hold more than one non-FIFA nationality.

No.	Pos.	Nation	Player
--	GK	UKR	Dmytro Kozachenko (from Nasaf Qarshi)
--	MF	UKR	Ilya Galuza (from Tavriya Simferopol)
--	MF	UKR	Oleksandr Hrytsai (from Arsenal Kyiv)
--	DF	UKR	Vitaliy Vernydub (from Metalurh Zaporizhia)

Out: Note: Flags indicate national team as defined under FIFA eligibility rules; some limited exceptions apply. Players may hold more than one non-FIFA nationality.

No.	Pos.	Nation	Player
--	FW	UKR	Taras Lazarovych (free agent)
--	GK	UKR	Ihor Shukhovtsev (retired)

== See also ==
- 2011-12 Ukrainian Premier League
