= 2011–12 FC Dnipro Dnipropetrovsk season =

Dnipro
2011–12 season
- Chairman: Andriy Stetsenkoov
- Manager: Juande Ramos
- Stadium: Dnipro Arena
- Premier League: 4th
- Ukrainian Cup: Last 16 vs Volyn Lutsk
- Europa League: Play-off round vs Fulham
- Top goalscorer: League: Nikola Kalinić (9); All: Nikola Kalinić (9)
- Highest home attendance: 31,003 vs Shakhtar Donetsk; 13 August 2011
- Lowest home attendance: 8,394 vs Chornomorets; 10 December 2011
- Average home league attendance: 15,636
Home colours	Away colours	Third colours

The 2011–12 Dnipro season was the club's 21st campaign in the Ukrainian Premier League, and their second season under manager Juande Ramos. The club finished the season in 4th place, whilst also reaching the Last 16 of the Ukrainian Cup and the play-off Round of the UEFA Europa League where they were eliminated by Fulham.

== Current squad ==
As of 13 January 2012

Note: Flags indicate national team as defined under FIFA eligibility rules; some limited exceptions apply. Players may hold more than one non-FIFA nationality.

No.	Pos.	Nation	Player
2	DF	GHA	Samuel Inkoom
3	DF	CZE	Ondřej Mazuch
4	MF	UKR	Serhiy Kravchenko
5	DF	UKR	Vitaliy Mandzyuk
7	MF	UKR	Denys Kulakov
8	MF	BRA	Giuliano
9	FW	CRO	Nikola Kalinić
10	MF	UKR	Yevhen Konoplianka
11	MF	UKR	Denys Oliynyk
14	DF	UKR	Yevhen Cheberyachko
17	DF	CRO	Ivan Strinić
18	FW	UKR	Roman Zozulya
19	DF	UZB	Vitaliy Denisov

No.	Pos.	Nation	Player
20	MF	GHA	Derek Boateng
22	FW	UKR	Oleksandr Hladkyy
24	DF	UKR	Pavlo Pashayev
27	GK	CZE	Jan Laštůvka
29	MF	UKR	Ruslan Rotan (captain)
30	MF	UKR	Yevhen Shakhov
32	GK	UKR	Anton Kanibolotskiy
36	MF	UKR	Ruslan Babenko
69	FW	UKR	Oleksiy Antonov
89	GK	UKR	Denys Shelikhov
99	FW	BRA	Matheus

=== On loan ===
Note: Flags indicate national team as defined under FIFA eligibility rules; some limited exceptions apply. Players may hold more than one non-FIFA nationality.

No.	Pos.	Nation	Player
—	DF	UKR	Vitaly Lysytsky (on loan to Kryvbas)
—	DF	GEO	Jaba Kankava (on loan to Kryvbas)
—	DF	GEO	Ucha Lobjanidze (on loan to Kryvbas)
—	MF	UKR	Valeriy Fedorchuk (on loan to Kryvbas)

No.	Pos.	Nation	Player
—	MF	UKR	Oleksandr Maksymov (on loan to Arsenal Kyiv)
—	MF	GEO	Aleqsandr Kobakhidze (on loan to Arsenal Kyiv)
—	MF	CRO	Mladen Bartulović (on loan to Kryvbas)
—	MF	CRO	Antonio Jakoliš (on loan to Kryvbas)
—	MF	UKR	Dmytro Lyopa (on loan to Kryvbas)
—	FW	UKR	Oleksiy Antonov (on loan to Kryvbas)

== Transfers ==
=== Summer ===
In: Note: Flags indicate national team as defined under FIFA eligibility rules; some limited exceptions apply. Players may hold more than one non-FIFA nationality.

No.	Pos.	Nation	Player
7	MF	UKR	Denys Kulakov (from (Ukraine) Vorskla Poltava)
9	FW	CRO	Nikola Kalinić (from (England) Blackburn Rovers)
11	MF	UKR	Denys Oliynyk (from (Ukraine) Metalist Kharkiv)
18	FW	UKR	Roman Zozulya (from (Ukraine) Dynamo Kyiv)
20	MF	GHA	Derek Boateng (from (Spain) Getafe)
69	FW	UKR	Oleksiy Antonov (from (Ukraine) Illichivets Mariupol)

Out: Note: Flags indicate national team as defined under FIFA eligibility rules; some limited exceptions apply. Players may hold more than one non-FIFA nationality.

No.	Pos.	Nation	Player
—	MF	UKR	Serhiy Nazarenko (Free to (Ukraine) Tavriya Simferopol)
—	FW	UKR	Yevhen Seleznyov (€5M to (Ukraine) Shakhtar Donetsk)
—	FW	UKR	Oleksiy Byelik (Free to (Ukraine) Metalurh Zaporizhya)
—	FW	ARG	Osmar Ferreyra (Free to (Argentina) Independiente)
—	MF	UKR	Artur Karnoza (Free to (Ukraine) Naftovyk-Ukrnafta Okhtyrka)
—	DF	GEO	Jaba Kankava (On Loan to (Ukraine) Kryvbas Kryvyi Rih)
—	DF	GEO	Ucha Lobjanidze (On Loan to (Ukraine) Kryvbas Kryvyi Rih)
—	MF	UKR	Kyrylo Petrov (On Loan to (Ukraine) Kryvbas Kryvyi Rih)
—	MF	UKR	Valeriy Fedorchuk (On Loan to (Ukraine) Kryvbas Kryvyi Rih)
—	FW	RUS	Sergei Samodin (On Loan to (Ukraine) Kryvbas Kryvyi Rih)
—	MF	CRO	Mladen Bartulović (On Loan to (Ukraine) Kryvbas Kryvyi Rih)
—	DF	UKR	Yevhen Baryshnikov (On Loan to (Ukraine) Kryvbas Kryvyi Rih)
—	DF	UKR	Vitaliy Lysytskyi (On Loan to (Ukraine) Kryvbas Kryvyi Rih)
—	FW	ROU	Yonuts Mazilu (On Loan to (Ukraine) Arsenal Kyiv)
—	MF	UKR	Oleksandr Maksymov (On Loan to (Ukraine) Arsenal Kyiv)
—	GK	UKR	Yevhen Borovyk (On Loan to (Ukraine) Arsenal Kyiv)
—	DF	BEL	Éric Matoukou (On Loan to (Ukraine) Arsenal Kyiv)
—	MF	GEO	Alexander Kobakhidze (On Loan to (Ukraine) Arsenal Kyiv)
—	FW	UKR	Volodymyr Homenyuk (On Loan to (Ukraine) Arsenal Kyiv)
--	MF	CZE	Mario Holek (to Sparta Prague)
--	MF	UKR	Dmytro Lepa (loan to Kryvbas)

=== Winter ===
In: Note: Flags indicate national team as defined under FIFA eligibility rules; some limited exceptions apply. Players may hold more than one non-FIFA nationality.

No.	Pos.	Nation	Player
3	DF	CZE	Ondřej Mazuch (from (Belgium) Anderlecht)
—	DF	UKR	Yevhen Baryshnikov (loan return from (Ukraine) Naftovyk-Ukrnafta)
—	DF	UKR	Vitaly Fedoriv (loan return from (Ukraine) Kryvbas)
—	MF	CRO	Antonio Jakoliš (from (Croatia) Šibenik)

Out: Note: Flags indicate national team as defined under FIFA eligibility rules; some limited exceptions apply. Players may hold more than one non-FIFA nationality.

No.	Pos.	Nation	Player
—	MF	CRO	Antonio Jakoliš (loan to (Ukraine) Kryvbas Kryvyi Rih)

== Competitions ==
=== Ukrainian Premier League ===
==== Results summary ====
Overall								Home						Away					
Pld	W	D	L	GF	GA	GD	Pts	W	D	L	GF	GA	GD	W	D	L	GF	GA	GD
30	14	7	9	49	34	+15	49	7	3	4	22	18	+4	7	4	5	27	16	+11

Last updated: 24 March 2012.
Source: Soccerway

==== Results by round ====
Round	1	2	3	4	5	6	7	8	9	10	11	12	13	14	15	16	17	18	19	20	21	22	23	24	25	26	27	28	29	30
Ground	A	A	H	H	A	H	A	H	A	H	A	H	A	H	A	H	H	A	A	H	A	H	A	H	A	H	A	H	A	H
Result	D	W	L	W	D	L	D	L	L	W	L	W	W	W	W	W	L	W	L	W	D	D	L	W	W	D	W	D	W	W
Position	7	2	8	6	7	9	9	9	11	9	9	9	7	5	5	4	5	4	5	4	4	4	4	4	4	4	4	4	4	4

Source: Soccerway
A = Away; H = Home; W = Win; D = Draw; L = Loss

==== Results ====
11 July 2011 1	Arsenal Kyiv	3–3	Dnipro	Valeriy Lobanovskiy Stadium
19:00 EEST (UTC+3)	Mazilu 17', 39'; Bohdanov 63'	Summary	Matheus 53' (pen.); Antonov 55', 89'	Attendance: 4,200; Referee: Dmitriy Zhukov

15 July 2011 2	Kryvbas	0–2	Dnipro	Metalurh Stadium
19:00 EEST (UTC+3)		Summary	Antonov 50', 90+4'	Attendance: 6,500; Referee: Andriy Shandor

24 July 2011 3	Dnipro	1–2	Volyn Lutsk	Dnipro Arena
19:30 EEST (UTC+3)	Matheus 89'	Summary	Maicon 84', 90+4'	Attendance: 19,793; Referee: Dmitriy Kutakov

30 July 2011 4	Dnipro	3–0	Illichivets	Dnipro Arena
19:30 EEST (UTC+3)	Cheberyachko 45', 49'; Oliynyk 60'	Summary		Attendance: 12,159; Referee: Yuriy Moseychuk

6 August 2011 5	Chornomorets	1–1	Dnipro	Chornomorets Stadium
21:00 EEST (UTC+3)	Burdujan 90+2'	Summary	Giuliano 43'	Attendance: 4,610; Referee: Yuriy Mozharovskiy

13 August 2011 6	Dnipro	1–3	Shakhtar Donetsk	Dnipro Arena
20:00 EEST (UTC+3)	Kalinić 81'; Kalinić (red card) 83'	Summary	Luiz Adriano 6'; Jádson 45+1'; Fernandinho 59'	Attendance: 31,003; Referee: Anatoliy Abdula

21 August 2011 7	Vorskla Poltava	0–0	Dnipro	Butovsky Vorskla Stadium
17:00 EEST (UTC+3)		Summary		Attendance: 7,850; Referee: Andriy Shandor

28 August 2011 8	Dnipro	0–4	Dynamo Kyiv	Dnipro Arena
17:30 EEST (UTC+3)		Summary	Popov 24'; Milevskyi 25'; Yarmolenko 45+2', 70'	Attendance: 20,568; Referee: Yury Vaks

11 September 2011 9	Zorya Luhansk	2–0	Dnipro	Avanhard Stadium, Lutsk
15:00 EEST (UTC+3)		Summary	Khomchenovskiy 45'; Bilyi 84'	Attendance: 5,000; Referee: Sergiy Boyko

17 September 2011 10	Dnipro	2–1	Tavriya Simferopol	Dnipro Arena
19:30 EEST (UTC+3)	Matheus 62'; Konoplianka 72'	Summary	Adeleye 31'	Attendance: 9,884; Referee: Dmitrit Kutakov

24 September 2011 11	Metalist Kharkiv	1–0	Dnipro	Metalist Stadium
17:30 EEST (UTC+3)	Taison 87'	Summary	Mandzyuk (yellow card) 63' (yellow-red card) 67'; Denisov (red card) 90'	Attendance: 38,656; Referee: Olexander Derdo

30 September 2011 12	Dnipro	5–1	Oleksandria	Dnipro Arena
19:00 EEST (UTC+3)	Konoplianka 38', 57'; Kalinić 44', 62'; Matheus 65'	Summary	Targamadze 25'	Attendance: 8,990; Referee: Andriy Shandor

16 October 2011 13	Obolon Kyiv	1–4	Dnipro	Obolon Arena
18:30 EEST (UTC+3)	Plastun 51'	Summary	Oliynyk 13', 23', 86'; Konoplianka 44'	Attendance: 4,500; Referee: Oleksandr Ivanov

22 October 2011 14	Dnipro	1–0	Metalurh Donetsk	Dnipro Arena
19:30 EEST (UTC+3)	Matheus 73'	Summary		Attendance: 12,881; Referee: Anatoliy Zhabchenko

30 October 2011 15	Karpaty Lviv	0–2	Dnipro	Arena Lviv
18:30 EET (UTC+2)		Summary	Kalinić 3'; Inkoom (yellow card) 43' (yellow-red card) 62'; Kravchenko 82'	Attendance: 10,600; Referee: Oleg Derevinskyi

5 November 2011 16	Dnipro	1–0	Arsenal Kyiv	Dnipro Arena
19:30 EET (UTC+2)	Kalinić 72'	Summary	Mikoliūnas (yellow card) 3' (yellow-red card) 67'	Attendance: 12,800; Referee: Andriy Shandor

19 November 2011 17	Dnipro	0–2	Kryvbas	Dnipro Arena
17:30 EET (UTC+2)		Summary	Lysenko 21' (penn.); Jeslínek 30'	Attendance: 10,138; Referee: Yuriy Moseychuk

26 November 2011 18	Volyn Lutsk	1–2	Dnipro	Avanhard Stadium
19:30 EET (UTC+2)	Ramon 47'	Summary	Kalinić 32', 38'	Attendance: 7,500; Referee: Yuri Mozharovskiy

4 December 2011 19	Illichivets Mariupol	3–2	Dnipro	Illichivets Stadium
13:00 EET (UTC+2)	Fomin 8'; Kozhanov 29'; Yaroshenko 87' (pen.)	Summary	Strinić (red card) 55'; Rotan 57'; Kalinić 74'; Rotan (red card) 89'	Attendance: 7,500; Referee: Igpr Ishchenko

10 December 2011 20	Dnipro	1–0	Chornomorets	Dnipro Arena
17:30 EET (UTC+2)	Kalinić 22' (pen.)	Summary		Attendance: 8,394; Referee: Oleg Derevinskyi

2 March 2012 21	Shakhtar Donetsk	1–1	Dnipro	Donbas Arena
16:00 EET (UTC+2)	Mkhitaryan 40'	Summary	Matheus 29'	Attendance: 39,873; Referee: Victor Shvetsov

10 March 2012 22	Dnipro	1–1	Vorskla Poltava	Dnipro Arena
17:30 EET (UTC+2)	Kravchenko 50'; Boateng (yellow card) 45+1' (red card) 82'	Summary	Januzi 77' (pen.)	Attendance: 9,422; Referee: Dmitriy Zhukov

18 March 2012 23	Dynamo Kyiv	2–0	Dnipro	Lobanovskyi Dynamo Stadium
17:30 EET (UTC+2)	Aliyev 67'; Milevskyi 83'	Summary		Attendance: 68,014; Referee: Anatoliy Abdula

24 March 2012 24	Dnipro	3–1	Zorya Luhansk	Dnipro Arena
17:30 EET (UTC+2)	Rotan 45'; Ignjatijević 71' (o.g.); Oliynyk 90+5'	Summary	Galyuza 83'	Attendance: 25,521; Referee: Yuriy Moseychuk

31 March 2012 25	Tavriya Simferopol	0–2	Dnipro	RSC Lokomotiv
13:30 EEST (UTC+3)		Summary	Zozulya 11'; Boateng 77'	Attendance: 8,100; Referee: Sergiy Boyko

9 April 2012 26	Dnipro	2–2	Metalist Kharkiv	Dnipro Arena
19:00 EEST (UTC+3)	Matheus 58'; Kalinić 84'	Summary	Sosa 31'; Devych 59'; Devych (red card) 90'	Attendance: 30,000; Referee: Yuri Mozharovskiy

14 April 2012 27	Oleksandria	1–5	Dnipro	CSC Nika
14:30 EEST (UTC+3)	Genev 23'; Hitchenko (red card) 54'	Summary	Konoplianka 55' (pen.), 90+1'; Strinić 72'; Strinić (yellow card) 57' (yellow-red card) 77'; Oliynyk 90'; Boateng 90+2'	Attendance: 3,500; Referee: Anatoliy Zhabchenko

21 April 2012 28	Dnipro	2–2	Obolon Kyiv	Dnipro Arena
15:30 EEST (UTC+3)	Matheus (red card) 14'; Konoplianka 67', 79' (pen.)	Summary	Baranets 55'; Zavarov 90+3'	Attendance: 10,709; Referee: Kostyantin Trukhanov

2 May 2012 29	Metalurh Donetsk	0–3	Dnipro	Metalurh Stadium
16:30 EEST (UTC+3)		Summary	Zozulya 8', 68'; Kalinić 42'	Attendance: 2,500; Referee: Sergiy Boyko

10 May 2012 30	Dnipro	2–0	Karpaty Lviv	Dnipro Arena
19:00 EEST (UTC+3)	Strinić 68'; Strinić (yellow card) 64' (yellow-red card) 81'; Oliynyk 87'	Summary	Balažic (yellow card) 41' (yellow-red card) 82'	Attendance: 15,170; Referee: Victor Shvetsov

==== League table ====
Pos	Team	Pld	W	D	L	GF	GA	GD	Pts	Qualification or relegation
2	Dynamo Kyiv	30	23	6	1	56	12	+44	75 (Note: Between Round 26 and Round 28 Dynamo Kyiv and Shakhtar Donetsk had accumulated the same number of points. With the possibility that both teams could finish the competition on the same number of points, the administration of the Premier League decided on 2 May 2012 before Round 29, that if a Golden Match was to be played to decide the championship winner, the encounter would have taken place on 13 May 2012 in Zaporizhzhia at Slavutych Arena.)	Qualification to Champions League third qualifying round
3	Metalist Kharkiv	30	16	11	3	54	32	+22	59 (Note: On 12 August 2010, the Football Federation of Ukraine punished Metalist Kharkiv and Karpaty Lviv for fixing a match in 2008; both teams were handed a fine and deducted nine points each. The FFU then released a statement on 19 October 2010 that the point deductions will be applied for the 2011–12 season. However, Karpaty Lviv have indicated that they will take the matter to the Court of Arbitration for Sport (CAS) at Lausanne. No action had been taken through the season nor of any decision by the league. On 2 August 2013 CAS acknowledged the fact of game fixing between Karpaty and Metalist in 2008. The court did not approve points deduction for both of the clubs, yet suggested to have Metalist stripped of its bronze awards for the 2007–08 Ukrainian Premier League and number of players and staff from both clubs were posed penalties and fines for involvement in the game fixing. On 6 August 2013 UEFA suspended advancement of Metalist Kharkiv in the 2013–14 UEFA Champions League to the playoff round until its final decision on 13 August 2013.)	Qualification to Europa League play-off round (Note: Metalurh Donetsk qualified for the Europa League as losing finalist of the 2011–12 Ukrainian Cup to Champions League-qualified Shakhtar Donetsk. Moreover, Dnipro Dnipropetrovsk and Arsenal Kyiv were moved up a round as the cup winner spot was not used.)
4	Dnipro Dnipropetrovsk	30	15	7	8	52	35	+17	52	Qualification to Europa League play-off round
5	Arsenal Kyiv	30	14	9	7	44	27	+17	51	Qualification to Europa League third qualifying round
6	Tavriya Simferopol	30	12	9	9	43	36	+7	45	

Source: uafootball.net.ua
Rules for classification: 1st points; 2nd goal difference; 3rd goals scored; 4th fair play

=== Ukrainian Cup ===
21 September 2011 Round of 32	Tytan Armyansk	0–1	Dnipro	Khimik Stadium, Armyansk
15:00 EEST (UTC+3)		Report (uk)	Matheus 69'	Attendance: 2,100; Referee: Hennadiy Makhno

26 October 2011 Last 16	Volyn Lutsk	3–2 (a.e.t.)	Dnipro	Avanhard Stadium,
18:00 EEST (UTC+3)	Goeber 17'; Sharpar 82'; Ramon 92' (pen.)	Report (uk)	Konoplianka 36' (pen.); Zozulya 38'	Attendance: 7,580; Referee: Serhiy Lysenchuk

=== UEFA Europa League ===
==== Play-off round ====
18 August 2011 1st Leg	Fulham	3–0	Dnipro	Craven Cottage, London
21:30 EEST (UTC+3)	Hughes 38'; Dempsey 43', 49'	Report		Attendance: 14,823; Referee: Pavel Královec (Czech Republic)

25 August 2011 2nd Leg	Dnipro	1–0 (1–3 agg.)	Fulham	Dnipro Arena, Dnipropetrovsk
21:30 EEST (UTC+3)	Shakhov 23'	Report		Attendance: 12,750; Referee: Tom Harald Hagen (Norway)

== Squad statistics ==
=== Appearances and goals ===
As of 24 May 2012

No.	Pos	Nat	Player	Total		Premier League		Ukrainian Cup		Europa League	
No.	Pos	Nat	Player	Apps	Goals	Apps	Goals	Apps	Goals	Apps	Goals
2	DF	(Ghana) GHA	Samuel Inkoom	18	0	13+3	0	1+0	0	1+0	0
3	DF	(Czech Republic) CZE	Ondřej Mazuch	10	0	10+0	0	0+0	0	0+0	0
4	MF	(Ukraine) UKR	Serhiy Kravchenko	30	2	20+6	2	2+0	0	2+0	0
5	DF	(Ukraine) UKR	Vitaliy Mandzyuk	30	0	26+0	0	2+0	0	2+0	0
7	MF	(Ukraine) UKR	Denys Kulakov	22	0	20+0	0	1+0	0	1+0	0
8	MF	(Brazil) BRA	Giuliano	27	1	17+7	1	0+1	0	2+0	0
9	FW	(Croatia) CRO	Nikola Kalinić	21	10	17+2	10	0+0	0	2+0	0
10	MF	(Ukraine) UKR	Yevhen Konoplianka	32	9	26+2	8	1+1	1	2+0	0
11	MF	(Ukraine) UKR	Denys Oliynyk	27	7	12+12	7	1+1	0	0+1	0
14	DF	(Ukraine) UKR	Yevhen Cheberyachko	31	2	28+0	0	1+0	2	2+0	0
16	DF	(Uzbekistan) UZB	Andrey Rusol	2	0	2+0	0	0+0	0	0+0	0
17	DF	(Croatia) CRO	Ivan Strinić	27	2	19+5	0	1+1	2	0+1	0
18	FW	(Ukraine) UKR	Roman Zozulya	18	4	7+8	3	1+1	1	0+1	0
19	DF	(Uzbekistan) UZB	Vitaliy Denisov	20	0	12+4	0	2+0	0	2+0	0
20	MF	(Ghana) GHA	Derek Boateng	25	2	17+4	2	2+0	0	2+0	0
21	DF	(Brazil) BRA	Alcides	0	0	0+0	0	0+0	0	0+0	0
22	FW	(Ukraine) UKR	Oleksandr Hladkyy	5	0	0+4	0	0+0	0	0+1	0
24	DF	(Uzbekistan) UZB	Pavlo Pashayev	0	0	0+0	0	0+0	0	0+0	0
27	GK	(Czech Republic) CZE	Jan Laštůvka	31	0	27+0	0	2+0	0	2+0	0
29	MF	(Ukraine) UKR	Ruslan Rotan	27	3	23+0	3	2+0	0	1+1	0
30	MF	(Ukraine) UKR	Yevhen Shakhov	19	1	6+11	0	1+0	0	1+0	1
32	GK	(Ukraine) UKR	Anton Kanibolotskiy	4	0	3+1	0	0+0	0	0+0	0
36	MF	(Ukraine) UKR	Ruslan Babenko	6	0	1+4	0	1+0	0	0+0	0
49	FW	(Ukraine) UKR	Valeri Kaverin	3	0	0+2	0	0+0	0	0+1	0
69	FW	(Ukraine) UKR	Oleksiy Antonov	13	4	5+5	4	2+0	0	0+1	0
88	MF	(Ukraine) UKR	Dmytro Lyopa	3	0	1+2	0	0+0	0	0+0	0
89	GK	(Ukraine) UKR	Denys Shelikhov	0	0	0+0	0	0+0	0	0+0	0
91	GK	(Ukraine) UKR	Ihor Vartsaba	0	0	0+0	0	0+0	0	0+0	0
99	FW	(Brazil) BRA	Matheus	25	7	17+6	7	0+1	0	0+1	0
Players who appeared for Dnipro who left the club during the season:
25	MF	(Czech Republic) CZE	Mario Holek	1	0	1+0	0	0+0	0	0+0	0

=== Goal scorers ===
Place	Position	Nation	Number	Name	Premier League	Ukrainian Cup	Europa League	Total
1	FW	(Croatia)	9	Nikola Kalinić	11	0	0	11
2	FW	(Brazil)	99	Matheus	8	1	0	9
2	MF	(Ukraine)	10	Yevhen Konoplianka	8	1	0	9
4	MF	(Ukraine)	11	Denys Oliynyk	7	0	0	7
5	FW	(Ukraine)	18	Roman Zozulya	4	1	0	5
6	FW	(Ukraine)	69	Oleksiy Antonov	3	0	0	3
7	DF	(Ukraine)	14	Yevhen Cheberyachko	2	0	0	2
7	MF	(Ukraine)	4	Serhiy Kravchenko	2	0	0	2
7	MF	(Ukraine)	29	Ruslan Rotan	2	0	0	2
7	MF	(Ghana)	20	Derek Boateng	2	0	0	2
7	DF	(Croatia)	17	Ivan Strinić	2	0	0	2
12	MF	(Brazil)	8	Giuliano	1	0	0	1
12	MF	(Ukraine)	30	Yevhen Shakhov	0	0	1	1
12				Own goal	1	0	0	1
				TOTALS	54	3	1	58

=== Disciplinary record ===
Number	Nation	Position	Name	Premier League		Ukrainian Cup		Europa League		Total	
Number	Nation	Position	Name	Yellow card	Red card	Yellow card	Red card	Yellow card	Red card	Yellow card	Red card
2	(Ghana)	DF	Samuel Inkoom	5	1	0	0	0	0	5	1
3	(Czech Republic)	DF	Ondřej Mazuch	3	0	0	0	0	0	3	0
4	(Ukraine)	MF	Serhiy Kravchenko	10	0	0	0	0	0	10	0
5	(Ukraine)	DF	Vitaliy Mandzyuk	5	1	0	0	0	0	5	1
7	(Ukraine)	MF	Denys Kulakov	3	0	0	0	0	0	3	0
8	(Brazil)	MF	Giuliano	1	0	0	0	0	0	1	0
9	(Croatia)	FW	Nikola Kalinić	4	1	0	0	0	0	4	1
10	(Ukraine)	MF	Yevhen Konoplianka	4	0	0	0	0	0	4	0
11	(Ukraine)	MF	Denys Oliynyk	3	0	0	0	1	0	4	0
14	(Ukraine)	DF	Yevhen Cheberyachko	4	0	0	0	0	0	4	0
17	(Croatia)	DF	Ivan Strinić	5	3	0	0	0	0	5	3
18	(Ukraine)	FW	Roman Zozulya	3	0	0	0	0	0	3	0
19	(Uzbekistan)	DF	Vitaliy Denisov	4	1	0	0	0	0	4	1
20	(Ghana)	MF	Derek Boateng	6	1	0	0	2	0	8	1
27	(Czech Republic)	GK	Jan Laštůvka	3	0	0	0	0	0	3	0
29	(Ukraine)	MF	Ruslan Rotan	10	1	0	0	0	0	10	1
30	(Ukraine)	MF	Yevhen Shakhov	1	0	0	0	0	0	1	0
69	(Ukraine)	FW	Oleksiy Antonov	1	0	0	0	0	0	1	0
88	(Ukraine)	MF	Dmytro Lyopa	1	0	0	0	0	0	1	0
99	(Brazil)	FW	Matheus	3	1	0	0	0	0	3	1
			TOTALS	77	10	0	0	3	0	80	10

== Team kit ==
These are the 2011–12 Dnipro Dnipropetrovsk kits.

Supplier: Nike
Sponsor(s): TM Biola

Home Kit	Away Kit	3rd Kit
