= 2011–12 Ukrainian Premier League =

21st season of top-tier football league in Vyshcha Liha

Ukrainian Premier League
- Season: 2011–12
- Champions: Shakhtar Donetsk; 7th title
- Relegated: Obolon Kyiv; PFC Oleksandria
- Champions League: Shakhtar Donetsk; Dynamo Kyiv
- Europa League: Metalist Kharkiv; Dnipro Dnipropetrovsk; Arsenal Kyiv; Metalurh Donetsk
- Matches: 240
- Goals: 609 (2.54 per match)
- Top goalscorer: 14 goals : Yevhen Seleznyov (Shakhtar); Maicon (Volyn)
- Biggest home win: Dynamo Kyiv 6–1 Zorya (Round 14); Shakhtar 5–0 Arsenal (Round 19)
- Biggest away win: Karpaty 0–5 Shakhtar (Round 18)
- Highest scoring: Metalurh 6–3 Vorskla (Round 18)
- Longest winning run: 10 – Dynamo Kyiv (Round 16–25)
- Longest unbeaten run: 25 – Dynamo Kyiv (Round 1–25)
- Longest losing run: 7 – Zorya (Round 14–20)
- Highest attendance: 68,014 Dynamo Kyiv–Dnipro (Round 23)
- Lowest attendance: 200 Zorya–Obolon (Round 19)

The 2011–12 Ukrainian Premier League season was the 21st since its establishment and fourth since its reorganisation. The season began on 8 July 2011 when newly promoted PFC Oleksandria visited FC Vorskla Poltava. FC Shakhtar Donetsk were the defending champions, having won their 6th league title in the 2010–11 season and they successfully defended their title by winning the championship in the last round of the competition.

A total of sixteen teams participated in the league, the best fourteen sides of the 2010–11 season and two promoted clubs from the 2010–11 Ukrainian First League.

The competition had a winter break which began on 11 December 2011 and the season resumed on 3 March 2012. The season concluded on 10 May 2012.

== Teams ==
=== Promoted ===
- PFC Oleksandria, champion of the 2010–11 Ukrainian First League – (returning after absence of 8 seasons)
- FC Chornomorets Odesa, runner-up of the 2010–11 Ukrainian First League – (returning after absence of a season)

=== Location map ===
Locations of team home grounds in Ukrainian Premier League 2011–12
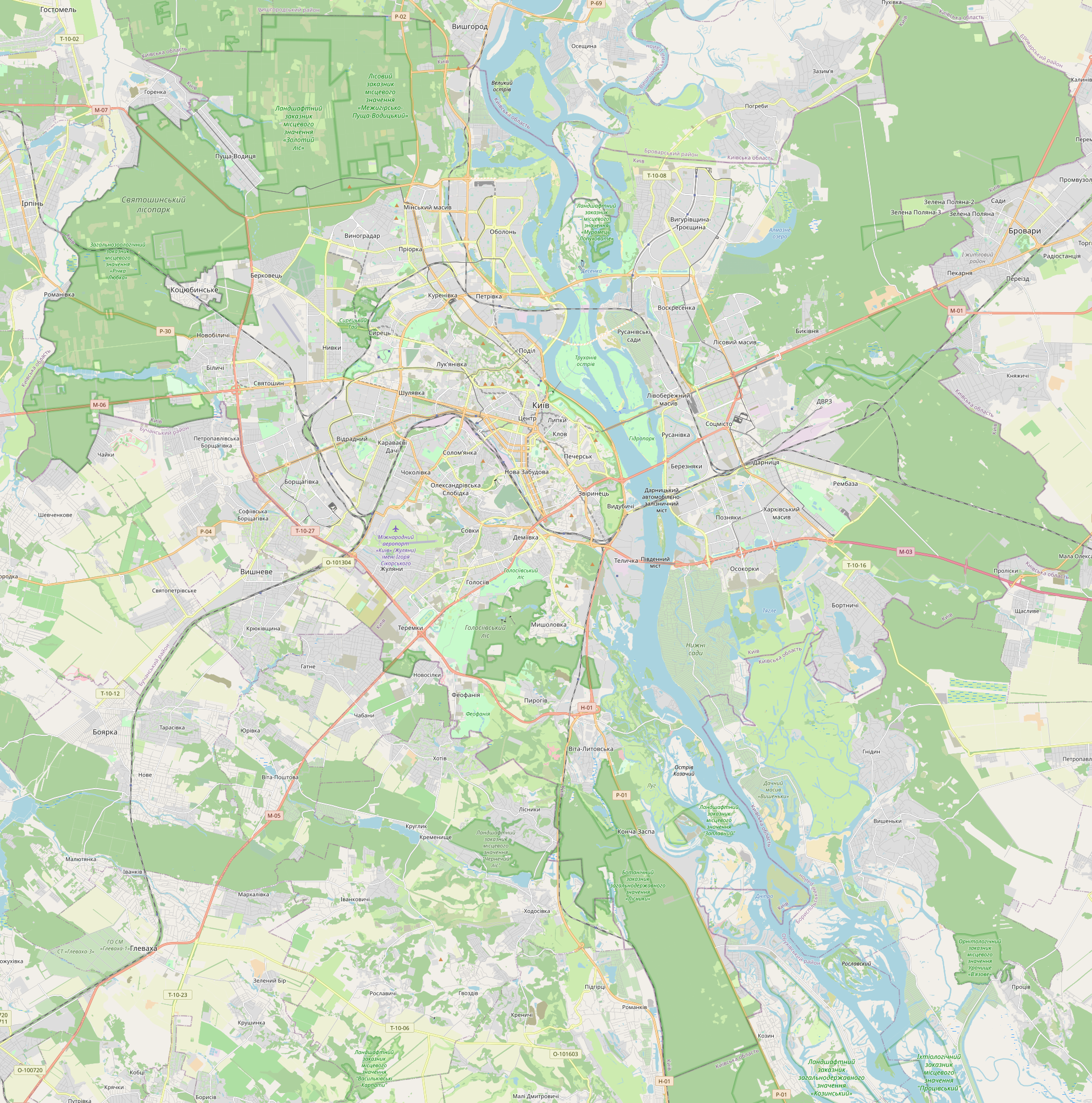
Kyiv city home venues of teams in the League

=== Stadiums ===
The following stadiums were used during the season.

Rank	Stadium	Club	Capacity	Highest Attendance		Notes
1	NSC Olimpiysky	Dynamo Kyiv	70,050	68,014	Round 23 (Dnipro)	Dynamo's home ground from Round 21 onwards
2	Donbas Arena	Shakhtar Donetsk	52,518	52,207	Round 26 (Dynamo)	
3	OSK Metalist	Metalist Kharkiv	38,656	38,656	Round 11 (Dnipro)	
4	Arena Lviv	Karpaty Lviv	34,915	32,600	Round 20 (Dynamo)	First home game for FC Karpaty Lviv in the Stadium built for Euro 2012 on 10 December 2011 against Dynamo Kyiv
5	Chornomorets Stadium	Chornomorets Odesa	34,164	31,060	Round 17 (Karpaty)	The inaugural match played on 19 November 2011, against FC Karpaty Lviv.
6	Dnipro Arena	Dnipro Dnipropetrovsk	31,003	31,003	Round 6 (Shakhtar)	
7	Metalurh Stadium	Kryvbas Kryvyi Rih	29,783	25,000	Round 20 (Shakhtar)	
8	Ukraina Stadium	Karpaty Lviv	28,051	13,000	Round 2 (Chornomorets)	
9	RSK Olimpiyskiy	Zorya Luhansk	25,831	700	Round 17 (Metalist)	Used as home ground in Round 17 and 19 due to Stal Stadium having no underground heating.
10	Vorskla Stadium	Vorskla Poltava	25,000	13,500	Round 25 (Shakhtar)	
11	Avanhard Stadium	Zorya Luhansk	22,288	20,000	Round 27 (Shakhtar)	
12	Lokomotiv Stadium	Tavriya Simferopol	19,978	15,100	Round 13 (Shakhtar)	
13	Lobanovskyi Dynamo Stadium	Dynamo Kyiv	16,873	17,000	Round 11 (Shakhtar)	
13	Lobanovskyi Dynamo Stadium	Arsenal Kyiv	16,873	13,000	Round 10 (Oleksandria)	Used as home ground in first half of the season(Rounds 1, 2, 4, 6, 8, 10, 12 & 15)
14	Illichivets Stadium	Illichivets Mariupol	12,680	11,000	Round 24 (Dynamo)	
15	Avanhard Stadium	Volyn Lutsk	12,080	11,000	Round 28 (Dynamo)	
16	Dynamo Stadium (Kharkiv)	Metalist Kharkiv	9,000	8,450	Round 2 (Zorya)	Used as home ground in Round 2 due to main stadium turf resewn.
17	Stal Stadium, Alchevsk	Zorya Luhansk	8,632	6,000	Round 5 (Metalurh)	Used as home ground in the first half of the season (Rounds 3, 5, 7, 9, 11, 13, 15 & 16) due to main stadium turf resewn.
18	CSC Nika Stadium	PFC Oleksandria	7,000	7,000	Round 2 (Dynamo); Round 15 (Shakhtar)	
19	Metalurh Stadium	Metalurh Donetsk	5,300	4,700	Round 2 (Shakhtar)	
20	Obolon Arena	Obolon Kyiv	5,100	5,100	Round 11 (Arsenal); Round 18 (Dynamo)	
21	Spartak Stadium	Chornomorets Odesa	4,610	4,610	Eight games	First eight home games were sold out

=== Managers and captains ===
Club	Coach	Captain	Replaced coach(es)
FC Arsenal Kyiv	(Belarus) Leonid Kuchuk	(Uzbekistan) Maksim Shatskikh	(Ukraine) Yuriy Bakalov
FC Chornomorets Odesa	(Ukraine) Roman Hryhorchuk	(Ukraine) Dmytro Bezotosnyi	
FC Dnipro Dnipropetrovsk	(Spain) Juande Ramos	(Ukraine) Ruslan Rotan	
FC Dynamo Kyiv	(Russia) Yuri Semin	(Ukraine) Oleksandr Shovkovskyi	
FC Illichivets Mariupol	(Ukraine) Ihor Leonov (caretaker)	(Ukraine) Adrian Pukanych	(Ukraine) Valeriy Yaremchenko
FC Karpaty Lviv	(Ukraine) Yuriy Dyachuk-Stavytskyi (interim)	(Ukraine) Andriy Tlumak	(Ukraine) Volodymyr Sharan (Russia) Pavel Kucherov (interim) (Belarus) Aleh Konanaw
FC Kryvbas Kryvyi Rih	(Ukraine) Yuriy Maksymov	(Ukraine) Vitaliy Lysytskyi	
FC Metalist Kharkiv	(Ukraine) Myron Markevych	(Brazil) Xavier	
FC Metalurh Donetsk	(Ukraine) Volodymyr Pyatenko	(Ukraine) Vyacheslav Checher	
FC Obolon Kyiv	(Ukraine) Serhiy Konyushenko	(Ukraine) Serhiy Sibiryakov	(Ukraine) Vasyl Rats (interim) (Ukraine) Serhiy Kovalets
PFC Oleksandria	(Ukraine) Andriy Kuptsov (interim)	(Ukraine) Yuriy Pankiv	(Ukraine) Leonid Buriak (Ukraine) Volodymyr Sharan
FC Shakhtar Donetsk	(Romania) Mircea Lucescu^{(1)}	(Croatia) Darijo Srna	
SC Tavriya Simferopol	(Ukraine) Semen Altman	(Ukraine) Volodymyr Yezerskyi	(Ukraine) Oleksandr Shudryk (interim)
FC Volyn Lutsk	(Ukraine) Anatoliy Demyanenko	(Ukraine) Oleksandr Pyschur	(Ukraine) Vitaliy Kvartsyanyi
FC Vorskla Poltava	(Ukraine) Mykola Pavlov	(Ukraine) Serhiy Dolhansky	
FC Zorya Luhansk	(Ukraine) Yuriy Vernydub (interim)	(Ukraine) Mykyta Kamenyuka	(Ukraine) Anatoly Chantsev

Notes:

- ^(1) Mircea Lucescu was injured in a car accident in his native Bucharest on 6 January 2012. Two days later he was operated on because of blood in his chest and broken ribs.

=== Managerial changes ===
Team	Outgoing head coach	Manner of departure	Date of vacancy	Table	Incoming head coach	Date of appointment
FC Arsenal Kyiv	(Ukraine) Yuriy Bakalov	End of contract	2 June	pre-season	(Belarus) Leonid Kuchuk	2 June
SC Tavriya Simferopol	(Ukraine) Oleksandr Shudryk (interim)	End as interim	9 June	pre-season	(Ukraine) Semen Altman	9 June
FC Illichivets Mariupol	(Ukraine) Valeriy Yaremchenko	Resigns	6 October	15th	(Ukraine) Ihor Leonov (interim)	6 October
FC Karpaty Lviv	(Russia) Oleg Kononov	Resigns	17 October	14th	(Russia) Pavel Kucherov (interim)	19 October
FC Obolon Kyiv	(Ukraine) Serhiy Kovalets	Sacked	31 October	16th	(Ukraine) Vasyl Rats (interim)	31 October
FC Obolon Kyiv	(Ukraine) Vasyl Rats (interim)	Dismissed for health reasons	26 November	16th	(Ukraine) Serhiy Konyushenko	26 November
FC Zorya Luhansk	(Ukraine) Anatoly Chantsev	Sacked	27 November	15th	(Ukraine) Yuriy Vernydub (interim)	27 November
PFC Oleksandria	(Ukraine) Volodymyr Sharan	Resigns	22 December (winter break)	14th	(Ukraine) Leonid Buriak	27 December (winter break)
FC Volyn Lutsk	(Ukraine) Vitaliy Kvartsyanyi	Sacked	27 December (winter break)	12th	(Ukraine) Anatoliy Demyanenko	8 January (winter break)
FC Karpaty Lviv	(Russia) Pavel Kucherov (interim)	End as interim	21 January (winter break)	13th	(Ukraine) Volodymyr Sharan	21 January (winter break)
FC Karpaty Lviv	(Ukraine) Volodymyr Sharan	Sacked	25 March	14th	(Ukraine) Yuriy Dyachuk-Stavytskyi (interim)	25 March
PFC Oleksandria	(Ukraine) Leonid Buriak	Resigns	3 April	16th	(Ukraine) Andriy Kuptsov (interim)	3 April

== Qualification to European competitions for 2012–13 ==
- Since Ukraine finished in eighth place of the UEFA country ranking after the 2010–11 season, the league will have the same number of qualifiers for 2012–13 UEFA Europa League. The Ukrainian Cup winner qualifies for the play-off round.

=== Qualified teams ===
- After the 22nd Round, Dynamo Kyiv qualified for European football for the 2012–13 season.
- During the 23rd Round, Shakhtar Donetsk qualified for European football for the 2012–13 season.
- During the 25th Round, Metalist Kharkiv qualified for European football for the 2012–13 season.
- After the 27th Round, Dynamo Kyiv and Shakhtar Donetsk qualified for the 2012–13 UEFA Champions League.
- After the 27th Round Metalist Kharkiv qualified for the 2012–13 Europa League Play-off round.
- Before the 29th Round Metalurh Donetsk qualified for the 2012–13 UEFA Europa League after advancing to the 2012 Ukrainian Cup Final.
- After the 29th Round Dnipro Dnipropetrovsk and Arsenal Kyiv qualified for the 2012–13 UEFA Europa League.
- Before the 30th Round Metalurh Donetsk qualified for the 2012–13 Europa League 2nd qualification round.
- After the 30th Round Arsenal Kyiv qualified for the 2012–13 Europa League 3rd qualification round.
- After the 30th Round Dnipro Dnipropetrovsk qualified for the 2012–13 Europa League Play-off round.
- After the 30th Round Dynamo Kyiv qualified for the 2012–13 Champions League 3rd qualification round.
- After the 30th Round Shakhtar Donetsk qualified for the 2012–13 Champions League Group stage.

== League table ==
Pos	Team	Pld	W	D	L	GF	GA	GD	Pts	Qualification or relegation
1	Shakhtar Donetsk (C)	30	25	4	1	80	18	+62	79 (Note: Between Round 26 and Round 28 Dynamo Kyiv and Shakhtar Donetsk had accumulated the same number of points. With the possibility that both teams could finish the competition on the same number of points, the administration of the Premier League decided on 2 May 2012 before Round 29, that if a Golden Match was to be played to decide the championship winner, the encounter would have taken place on 13 May 2012 in Zaporizhzhia at Slavutych Arena.)	Qualification to Champions League group stage
2	Dynamo Kyiv	30	23	6	1	56	12	+44	75	Qualification to Champions League third qualifying round
3	Metalist Kharkiv	30	16	11	3	54	32	+22	59 (Note: On 12 August 2010, the Football Federation of Ukraine punished Metalist Kharkiv and Karpaty Lviv for fixing a match in 2008; both teams were handed a fine and deducted nine points each. The FFU then released a statement on 19 October 2010 that the point deductions will be applied for the 2011–12 season. However, Karpaty Lviv have indicated that they will take the matter to the Court of Arbitration for Sport (CAS) at Lausanne. No action had been taken through the season nor of any decision by the league. On 2 August 2013 CAS acknowledged the fact of game fixing between Karpaty and Metalist in 2008. The court did not approve points deduction for both of the clubs, yet suggested to have Metalist stripped of its bronze awards for the 2007–08 Ukrainian Premier League and number of players and staff from both clubs were posed penalties and fines for involvement in the game fixing. On 6 August 2013 UEFA suspended advancement of Metalist Kharkiv in the 2013–14 UEFA Champions League to the playoff round until its final decision on 13 August 2013.)	Qualification to Europa League play-off round (Note: Metalurh Donetsk qualified for the Europa League as losing finalist of the 2011–12 Ukrainian Cup to Champions League-qualified Shakhtar Donetsk. Moreover, Dnipro Dnipropetrovsk and Arsenal Kyiv were moved up a round as the cup winner spot was not used.)
4	Dnipro Dnipropetrovsk	30	15	7	8	52	35	+17	52	Qualification to Europa League play-off round
5	Arsenal Kyiv	30	14	9	7	44	27	+17	51	Qualification to Europa League third qualifying round
6	Tavriya Simferopol	30	12	9	9	43	36	+7	45	
7	Metalurh Donetsk	30	12	6	12	35	34	+1	42	Qualification to Europa League second qualifying round
8	Vorskla Poltava	30	9	10	11	38	43	−5	37	
9	Chornomorets Odesa	30	10	7	13	32	42	−10	37	
10	Kryvbas Kryvyi Rih	30	9	6	15	22	38	−16	33	
11	Illichivets Mariupol	30	8	8	14	28	42	−14	32	
12	Volyn Lutsk	30	7	6	17	25	43	−18	27	
13	Zorya Luhansk	30	6	8	16	34	58	−24	26	
14	Karpaty Lviv	30	5	8	17	27	51	−24	23	
15	Obolon Kyiv (R)	30	4	9	17	17	42	−25	21	Relegation to Ukrainian First League
16	PFC Oleksandriya (R)	30	4	8	18	24	58	−34	20	Relegation to Ukrainian First League

Source: uafootball.net.ua
Rules for classification: 1st points; 2nd goal difference; 3rd goals scored; 4th fair play
(C) Champions; (R) Relegated

=== Round by round ===
The following table represents the teams position after each round in the competition.

Team ╲ Round	1	2	3	4	5	6	7	8	9	10	11	12	13	14	15	16	17	18	19	20	21	22	23	24	25	26	27	28	29	30
Arsenal Kyiv	8	11	5	7	4	8	4	6	7	5	4	4	4	4	4	5	4	6	6	6	7	6	6	6	5	5	6	5	5	5
Chornomorets Odesa	11	13	15	15	14	15	14	14	15	15	14	11	13	12	11	11	11	10	10	11	10	10	10	10	10	10	10	10	9	9
Dynamo Kyiv	10	4	2	4	2	2	2	1	2	2	2	2	2	1	1	1	1	1	1	1	1	1	1	1	1	2	2	2	2	2
Dnipro	7	2	8	6	7	9	9	9	11	9	9	9	7	5	5	4	5	4	5	4	4	4	4	4	4	4	4	4	4	4
Illichivets Mariupol	3	6	10	13	13	11	13	10	12	12	12	15	10	10	12	12	12	12	11	10	11	11	11	11	12	12	12	11	11	11
Karpaty Lviv	12	14	14	14	16	12	12	15	14	14	15	13	14	14	14	13	13	13	13	13	13	13	14	14	15	16	14	14	14	14
Kryvbas Kryvyi Rih	4	10	4	3	6	7	8	5	4	4	7	5	5	7	7	8	6	5	4	5	5	7	9	9	8	9	8	9	10	10
Metalist Kharkiv	9	5	7	5	3	3	3	3	3	3	3	3	3	2	3	3	3	3	3	3	3	3	3	3	3	3	3	3	3	3
Metalurh Donetsk	5	9	12	11	12	14	15	12	10	8	8	8	6	8	8	7	9	7	8	8	8	8	7	7	7	7	7	7	7	7
Obolon Kyiv	16	16	16	16	15	16	16	16	16	16	16	16	16	16	16	16	16	16	16	16	16	16	16	16	14	15	16	15	15	15
PFC Oleksandriya	6	8	13	12	11	13	11	13	13	13	13	14	15	15	15	15	15	14	14	14	15	15	15	15	16	14	15	16	16	16
Shakhtar Donetsk	1	1	1	1	1	1	1	2	1	1	1	1	1	3	2	2	2	2	2	2	2	2	2	2	2	1	1	1	1	1
Tavriya Simferopol	2	3	6	8	8	4	5	4	5	6	5	6	9	9	9	9	7	8	7	7	6	5	5	5	6	6	5	6	6	6
Volyn Lutsk	13	12	9	10	10	6	7	7	8	10	10	10	12	11	10	10	10	11	12	12	12	12	12	12	11	11	11	12	12	12
Vorskla Poltava	14	7	3	2	5	5	6	8	6	7	6	7	8	6	6	6	8	9	9	9	9	9	8	8	9	8	9	8	8	8
Zorya Luhansk	15	15	11	9	9	10	10	11	9	11	11	12	11	13	13	14	14	15	15	15	14	14	13	13	13	13	13	13	13	13

Source: Dynamo Kyiv's Official Site (in Ukrainian)

== Results ==
Home \ Away	ARK	CHO	DNI	DYN	ILL	KAR	KRY	MET	MDO	OBO	OLK	SHA	TAV	VOL	VOR	ZOR
Arsenal Kyiv	—	0–1	3–3	0–2	0–0	3–2	2–0	4–2	1–0	4–1	0–0	1–1	2–3	3–0	2–0	1–1
Chornomorets Odesa	0–3	—	1–1	1–2	1–0	2–2	1–2	3–3	0–1	1–0	2–1	2–2	1–0	0–0	2–1	2–3
Dnipro	1–0	1–0	—	0–4	3–0	2–0	0–2	2–2	1–0	2–2	5–1	1–3	2–1	1–2	1–1	3–1
Dynamo Kyiv	1–0	3–1	2–0	—	3–1	2–0	1–0	1–1	1–0	4–0	4–0	0–0	1–1	2–1	3–0	6–1
Illichivets Mariupol	0–0	1–1	3–2	0–1	—	1–0	1–3	0–1	2–1	2–1	2–0	1–2	0–2	1–2	4–1	1–1
Karpaty Lviv	0–3	1–1	0–2	0–1	3–0	—	2–0	1–2	0–2	0–0	1–1	0–5	2–3	1–0	0–2	2–1
Kryvbas Kryvyi Rih	0–2	1–0	0–2	0–3	2–0	1–1	—	0–1	1–2	1–0	1–2	0–4	0–3	1–0	0–0	2–1
Metalist Kharkiv	0–0	1–0	1–0	1–2	0–0	3–1	1–1	—	2–0	1–0	2–1	1–2	2–0	3–1	2–2	3–2
Metalurh Donetsk	1–1	3–0	0–3	0–0	0–0	2–1	1–0	1–1	—	2–0	3–1	0–2	1–3	0–3	6–3	3–0
Obolon Kyiv	0–1	0–1	1–4	0–1	0–0	2–0	0–0	3–3	0–1	—	1–1	0–2	1–3	1–0	0–1	0–0
PFC Oleksandriya	1–2	1–3	1–5	1–3	1–2	1–1	1–1	1–3	0–0	1–0	—	2–3	0–0	0–1	1–1	1–0
Shakhtar Donetsk	5–0	4–0	1–1	2–0	3–0	2–1	2–0	1–2	2–0	4–0	3–0	—	3–1	5–1	1–0	4–1
Tavriya Simferopol	1–1	2–0	0–2	0–0	3–2	1–1	1–2	0–0	1–1 (Note: Originally the Round 21 fixture was cancelled due to condition of the pitch at Lokomotiv Stadium. Match was rescheduled and played on 24 April 2012.)	0–0	4–1	1–3	—	1–0	0–2	3–1
Volyn Lutsk	1–0	0–2	1–2	0–1	0–1	0–2	0–0	0–3	0–2	1–1	3–1	1–2	2–2	—	0–0	2–2
Vorskla Poltava	0–2	3–1	0–0	1–2	3–1	1–1	2–1	2–2	4–2	0–1	0–1	0–2	3–2	3–1	—	2–2
Zorya Luhansk	0–3	0–2	2–0	0–0	2–2	5–1	2–0	1–5	1–0	1–2	2–0	1–5	0–1	0–2	0–0	—

Source: uafootball.net.ua
Legend: Blue = home team win; Yellow = draw; Red = away team win.

== Top goalscorers ==
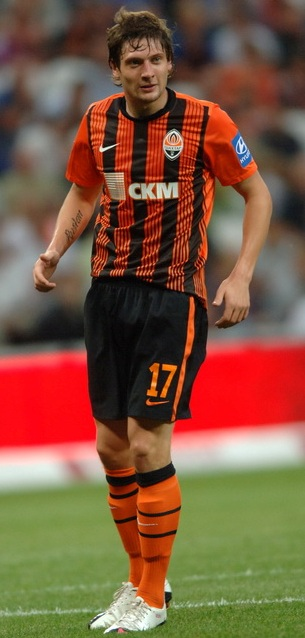
Seleznyov

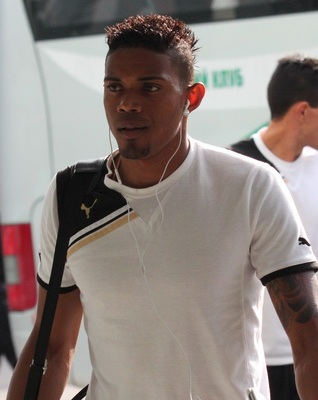
Maicon

in 2011

The competition's top ten goalscorers.

As of 10 May 2012

#	Scorer	Goals (Pen.)	Team
1	(Ukraine) Yevhen Seleznyov	14	Shakhtar Donetsk
1	(Brazil) Maicon	14 (2)	Volyn Lutsk
3	(Nigeria) Brown Ideye	12	Dynamo Kyiv
3	(Ukraine) Andriy Yarmolenko	12	Dynamo Kyiv
3	(Brazil) Luiz Adriano	12 (3)	Shakhtar Donetsk
6	(Ukraine) Anton Shynder	11	Tavriya Simferopol
6	(Ukraine) Marko Devich	11 (2)	Metalist Kharkiv
8	(Argentina) Cristaldo	10	Metalist Kharkiv
8	(Armenia) Henrikh Mkhitaryan	10	Shakhtar Donetsk
8	(Croatia) Nikola Kalinić	10 (1)	Dnipro Dnipropetrovsk
8	(Brazil) Cleiton Xavier	10 (1)	Metalist Kharkiv

== Season awards ==
The laureates of the 2011–12 UPL season were:

- Best player: (Ukraine) Yevhen Konoplyanka (Dnipro Dnipropetrovsk)
- Best coach: (Romania) Mircea Lucescu (Shakhtar Donetsk)
- Best goalkeeper: (Ukraine) Oleksandr Shovkovskyi (Dynamo Kyiv)
- Best arbiter: (Ukraine) Anatoliy Abdula (Kharkiv)
- Best young player: (Ukraine) Roman Bezus (Vorskla Poltava)
- Best goalscorer: (Ukraine) Yevhen Seleznyov (Shakhtar Donetsk)

== See also ==
- 2011–12 Ukrainian First League
- 2011–12 Ukrainian Premier League Reserves
- 2011–12 Ukrainian Second League
- 2011–12 Ukrainian Cup
- 2011–12 UEFA Europa League
- List of Ukrainian football transfers winter 2011–12
