= Oparin (disambiguation) =

Oparin may refer to:

== People ==
- Alexander Oparin (1894–1980), Soviet biochemist
- Grigoriy Oparin (born 1997), Russian-American chess player
- Mikhail Oparin (born 1991), Russian footballer
- Petro Oparin (born 1993), Ukrainian footballer
