= Yevhen Konoplyanka =

Ukrainian footballer (born 1989)

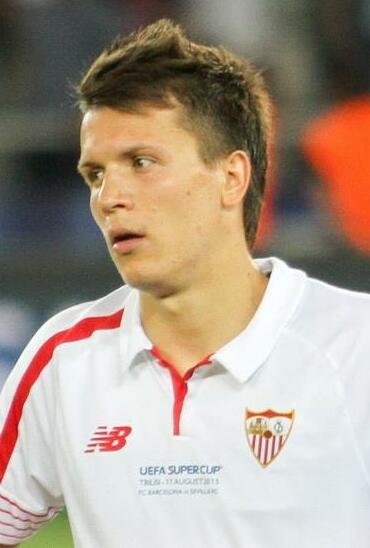
- Konoplyanka with Sevilla in 2015

Personal information
- Full name: Yevhen Olehovych Konoplyanka
- Date of birth: 29 September 1989 (age 37)
- Place of birth: Kirovohrad, Ukrainian SSR, Soviet Union
- Height: 1.78 m (5 ft 10 in)
- Position: Winger

Youth career
- 2002–2004: Olimpik Kirovohrad
- 2004–2005: DYuSSh-2 Kirovohrad
- 2006: Dnipro Dnipropetrovsk

Senior career*
Years	Team	Apps	(Gls)
2006–2008	Dnipro-2 Dnipropetrovsk		
2007–2015	Dnipro Dnipropetrovsk	157	(35)
2015–2017	Sevilla	32	(4)
2016–2017	→ Schalke 04 (loan)	17	(1)
2017–2019	Schalke 04	40	(5)
2019–2021	Shakhtar Donetsk	28	(4)
2022–2023	Cracovia	36	(2)
2023	CFR Cluj	3	(0)
Total		313	(51)

International career
2006	Ukraine U17	1	(0)
2007–2008	Ukraine U19	9	(3)
2008–2011	Ukraine U21	16	(5)
2010–2023	Ukraine	87	(21)
- * Club domestic league appearances and goals

Yevhen Olehovych Konoplyanka (Ukrainian: Євге́н Оле́гович Конопля́нка; born 29 September 1989) is a Ukrainian former professional footballer who played as a winger.

Konoplyanka began his professional career at Dnipro Dnipropetrovsk, where he made his debut in 2007 and featured in 211 matches across all competitions, scoring 45 goals and helping them to the 2015 UEFA Europa League Final. He then moved on a free transfer to the opponent team who won that match, Sevilla, and won the Europa League in his only season in Spain before joining Schalke 04 on an initial loan. In 2019, Konoplyanka returned to his native country with Shakhtar Donetsk, before brief stints at Cracovia and CFR Cluj.

A full international for Ukraine from 2010 to 2023, Konoplyanka earned over 80 caps and scored 21 goals. He represented his nation in the 2012 and 2016 editions of the UEFA European Championship, and is a three-time Ukrainian Footballer of the Year winner.

== Club career ==
=== Early career ===
At age seven, Konoplyanka signed up for a karate class, which he did simultaneously with football, eventually reaching black belt. He is a product of the youth system of Olimpik Kirovohrad, and coach Yuriy Kevlych. He also participated in the Ukrainian National Youth Competition, representing DYuSSh-2 Kirovohrad.

=== Dnipro Dnipropetrovsk ===
Konoplyanka was signed as a youth by Dnipro Dnipropetrovsk at age 16. In the winter of 2006, he was promoted to the reserves with a starting salary of $300.

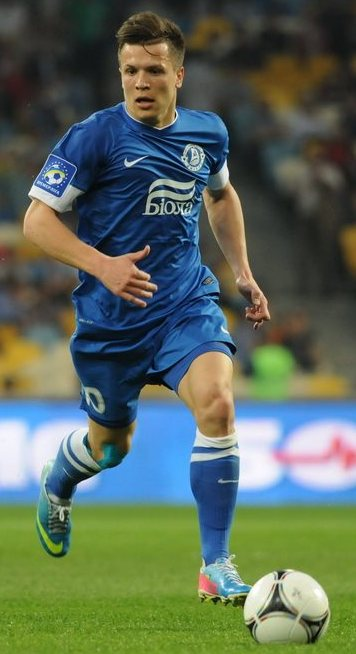
Konoplyanka with Dnipro Dnipropetrovsk in 2013

Konoplaynka's senior team debut came in a Ukrainian Premier League match on 26 August 2007 in a home game against Zakarpattia Uzhhorod which ended 0–0. Konoplyanka came on during the 83rd minute, replacing Jaba Kankava.

His first goal in the Ukrainian Premier League came 28 February 2010 in a home game against Zorya Luhansk which ended 2–2. In the second half of the 2009–10 season, Konoplyanka started and played the full 90 minutes in all of the remaining games.

In March 2011, Dynamo Kyiv interim coach Oleh Luzhnyi expressed his desire to see Konoplyanka in his ranks and the media reported that Dynamo would make an offer to Dnipro worth €14 million. In response, Dnipro coach Juande Ramos placed a sensational scare price-tag ranging from €50–€60 million, commenting that "in order to build a great team, great players should play there."

In January 2014, Konoplyanka nearly moved to English team Liverpool for £16 million, his buyout clause, but Dnipro president Ihor Kolomoyskyi refused to sanction the transfer.

Konoplyanka was a major catalyst in Dnipro's successful 2014–15 season where he helped them to a 3rd place in the domestic league and a place in the Europa League final. He was named in the competition's squad of the season.

=== Sevilla ===
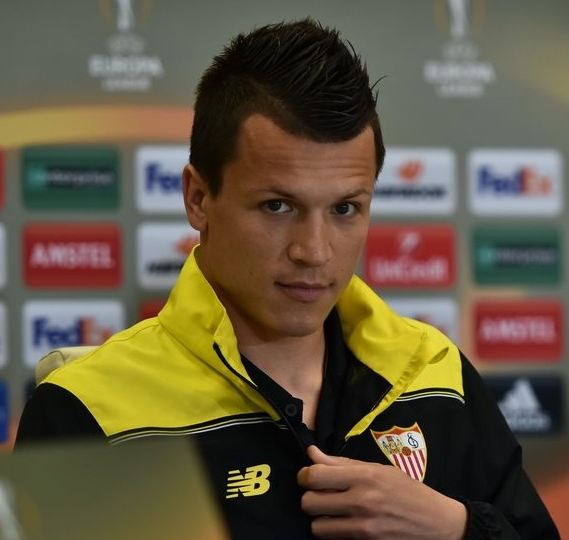
Konoplyanka with Sevilla during a 2016 press conference.

On 2 July 2015, Sevilla announced that Konoplyanka was undergoing a medical. A week later, the Spanish club confirmed that he had joined on a free transfer, and signed a four-year deal, with a reported release clause of €40 million.

On 11 August, he made his competitive debut for Sevilla in the 2015 UEFA Super Cup against Barcelona, as a 68th-minute substitute for captain José Antonio Reyes. He scored an 81st-minute equaliser as Sevilla came from behind to draw 4–4, but they lost 5–4 after extra time. Ten days later, he made his La Liga debut in a goalless draw at Málaga, again as a 65th-minute substitute for Reyes, and on 16 September, he scored on his UEFA Champions League debut, concluding a 3–0 group stage win over Borussia Mönchengladbach at the Estadio Ramon Sánchez Pizjuán with his first touch of the game. Ten days later, after coming off the bench against Rayo Vallecano, he attained his first league goal for the Andalusians, winning the match 3–2 with a late free kick for a first victory of the season.

At the end of the calendar year, Konoplyanka was one of the shortlisted nominees for UEFA Team of the Year. He was an unused substitute in the 2016 UEFA Europa League Final, where Sevilla beat Liverpool 3–1 in Basel to claim their fifth trophy. He played seven matches in their Copa del Rey campaign, scoring a late equaliser as a substitute in a 2–2 draw at Celta Vigo in the semi-finals (6–2 aggregate), and also came off the bench in the final where they lost 2–0 to Barcelona after extra time. On 9 August, he scored a penalty in the 2016 UEFA Super Cup against Real Madrid, an eventual 3–2 loss following extra time in Trondheim.

=== Schalke 04 ===
On 30 August 2016, Konoplyanka was loaned to Schalke 04 with an obligatory buyout clause at the end of the campaign for €12.5 million. He made his debut on 9 September in a 2–0 home loss to reigning Bundesliga champions Bayern Munich, and scored his first goal on 20 October, the game's only in an away Europa League group game at Krasnodar. Six days later, he struck twice in the first half of a 3–2 win at 1. FC Nürnberg in the second round of the DFB-Pokal. In a mid-table season, his only goal of 17 league games was scored on 17 December to equalise in a 1–1 draw with SC Freiburg at the Veltins-Arena.

=== Shakhtar Donetsk ===
On 2 September 2019, Konoplyanka signed a three-year deal with Shakhtar Donetsk.

=== Cracovia ===
After becoming a free agent, on 11 February 2022 Konoplyanka signed a half-year contract with an extension option for Ekstraklasa club Cracovia. He left the team following the conclusion of the 2022–23 season, after scoring two goals in 36 league matches.

=== CFR Cluj ===
On 25 July 2023, it was announced that Konoplyanka joined Romanian team CFR Cluj. He made his debut for the club on 3 August, in a 1–2 away loss to Adana Demirspor in the second qualifying round of the UEFA Europa Conference League.

On 3 January 2024, Konoplyanka was released by CFR Cluj after only playing four games. On 17 July 2024, Konoplyanka announced his retirement from professional football.

== International career ==
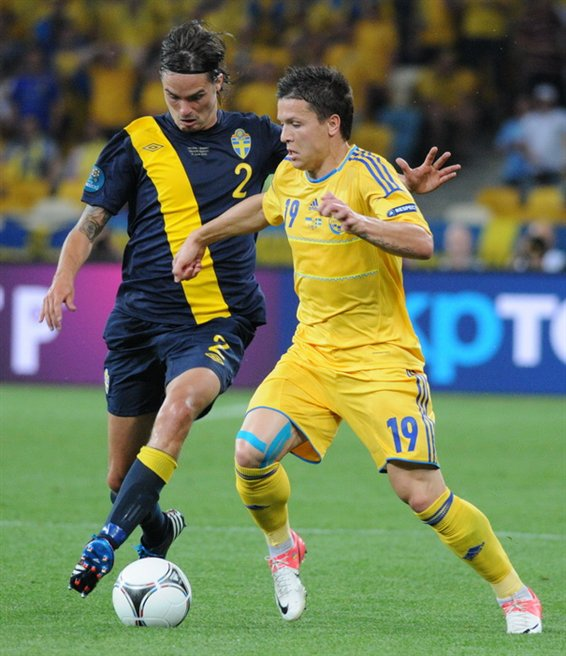
Konoplyanka challenging Sweden's Mikael Lustig at Euro 2012

In April 2010, Konoplyanka was first called up to Ukraine's senior national team by head coach Myron Markevych. He made his international debut on 25 May, playing the entirety of a 4–0 friendly win over Lithuania in Kharkiv. Four days later at Arena Lviv, he scored the equaliser as Ukraine came from behind to defeat Romania 3–2 in another friendly. Participated in the final match of Cyprus International Football Tournaments in 2011, when Ukraine won Sweden.

In the Euro 2012 tournament, Konoplyanka started in all three of Ukraine's matches as the co-hosts exited in the group stage. In their opening game at the Olympic Stadium in Kyiv, he assisted Andriy Shevchenko's winning goal with a corner for a 2–1 victory against Sweden.

On 11 September 2012, Konoplyanka scored a long-range goal in a 1–1 draw against England at Wembley Stadium in a 2014 FIFA World Cup qualifier. The BBC said of his performance: "the tremendous Yevhen Konoplyanka delivered a masterful performance to dictate in midfield". He scored two more goals in Ukraine's qualifying campaign, in victories over San Marino and Montenegro, but the team lost to France in a play-off for the tournament.

Konoplyanka scored twice in 11 matches as Ukraine qualified for Euro 2016, their first successful qualification campaign. He captained the team for their 3–1 aggregate win over Slovenia in the play-off in November 2015.

He was included in Ukraine's squad for Euro 2016 in France, where Ukraine failed to score and finished bottom of the group.

== Career statistics ==
=== Club ===
Appearances and goals by club, season and competition
Club	Season	League			National cup (Note: Includes Ukrainian Cup, Copa del Rey, DFB-Pokal, Polish Cup)		Europe		Other		Total	
Club	Season	Division	Apps	Goals	Apps	Goals	Apps	Goals	Apps	Goals	Apps	Goals
Dnipro Dnipropetrovsk	2007–08	Ukrainian Premier League	2	0	1	0	0	0	—		3	0
Dnipro Dnipropetrovsk	2008–09	Ukrainian Premier League	12	0	0	0	0	0	—		12	0
Dnipro Dnipropetrovsk	2009–10	Ukrainian Premier League	22	4	2	0	—		—		24	4
Dnipro Dnipropetrovsk	2010–11	Ukrainian Premier League	25	6	3	0	3 (Note: Appearances in UEFA Europa League)	0	—		31	6
Dnipro Dnipropetrovsk	2011–12	Ukrainian Premier League	28	8	2	1	2	0	—		32	9
Dnipro Dnipropetrovsk	2012–13	Ukrainian Premier League	20	2	3	0	9	3	—		32	5
Dnipro Dnipropetrovsk	2013–14	Ukrainian Premier League	27	8	1	1	8	4	—		36	13
Dnipro Dnipropetrovsk	2014–15	Ukrainian Premier League	21	7	4	0	17 (Note: Two appearances in UEFA Champions League, fifteen appearances and one goal in UEFA Europa League)	1	—		42	8
Dnipro Dnipropetrovsk	Total		157	35	16	2	39	8	—		212	45
Sevilla	2015–16	La Liga	32	4	7	1	12 (Note: Six appearances and two goals in UEFA Champions League, six appearances in UEFA Europa League)	2	1 (Note: Appearance in UEFA Super Cup)	1	52	8
Sevilla	2016–17	La Liga	0	0	0	0	0	0	2 (Note: One appearance and one goal in UEFA Super Cup, one appearance in Supercopa de España)	1	2	1
Sevilla	Total		32	4	7	1	12	2	3	2	54	9
Schalke 04 (loan)	2016–17	Bundesliga	17	1	2	3	8	2	—		27	6
Schalke 04	2017–18	Bundesliga	27	4	3	2	—		—		30	6
Schalke 04	2018–19	Bundesliga	13	1	2	0	6 (Note: Appearances in UEFA Champions League)	0	—		21	1
Schalke 04	Total		57	6	7	5	14	2	—		78	13
Shakhtar Donetsk	2019–20	Ukrainian Premier League	20	4	1	0	9 (Note: Four appearances and one goal in UEFA Champions League, five appearances in UEFA Europa League)	1	—		30	5
Shakhtar Donetsk	2020–21	Ukrainian Premier League	8	0	1	0	4	0	1 (Note: Appearance in Ukrainian Super Cup)	0	14	0
Shakhtar Donetsk	2021–22	Ukrainian Premier League	0	0	0	0	2	0	—		2	0
Shakhtar Donetsk	Total		28	4	2	0	15	1	1	0	46	5
Cracovia	2021–22	Ekstraklasa	10	0	—		—		—		10	0
Cracovia	2022–23	Ekstraklasa	26	2	2	2	—		—		28	4
Cracovia	Total		36	2	2	2	—		—		38	4
CFR Cluj	2023–24	Liga I	3	0	0	0	1 (Note: Appearance in UEFA Europa Conference League)	0	—		4	0
Career total			313	51	34	10	81	13	4	2	432	76

=== International ===
Appearances and goals by national team and year
National team	Year	Apps	Goals
Ukraine	2010	6	2
Ukraine	2011	9	2
Ukraine	2012	10	2
Ukraine	2013	10	2
Ukraine	2014	6	0
Ukraine	2015	10	3
Ukraine	2016	9	2
Ukraine	2017	8	2
Ukraine	2018	10	4
Ukraine	2019	7	2
Ukraine	2020	1	0
Ukraine	2021	0	0
Ukraine	2022	0	0
Ukraine	2023	1	0
Total		87	21

Scores and results list Ukraine's goal tally first, score column indicates score after each Konoplyanka goal.

List of international goals scored by Yevhen Konoplyanka:Scores and results list Ukraine's goal tally first, score column indicates score after each Konoplyanka goal.
No.	Date	Venue	Opponent	Score	Result	Competition
1	29 May 2010	Ukraina Stadium, Lviv, Ukraine	Romania	2–2	3–2	Friendly
2	17 November 2010	Stade de Genève, Geneva, Switzerland	Switzerland	2–2	2–2	Friendly
3	2 September 2011	Metalist Stadium, Kharkiv, Ukraine	Uruguay	2–1	2–3	Friendly
4	11 November 2011	NSC Olympiyskiy Stadium, Kyiv, Ukraine	Germany	2–0	3–3	Friendly
5	29 February 2012	HaMoshava Stadium, Petah Tikva, Israel	Israel	2–0	3–2	Friendly
6	11 September 2012	Wembley Stadium, London, England	England	1–0	1–1	2014 FIFA World Cup qualification
7	7 June 2013	Podgorica City Stadium, Podgorica, Montenegro	Montenegro	2–0	4–0	2014 FIFA World Cup qualification
8	6 September 2013	Arena Lviv, Lviv, Ukraine	San Marino	5–0	9–0	2014 FIFA World Cup qualification
9	9 June 2015	Linzer Stadion, Linz, Austria	Georgia	2–0	2–1	Friendly
10	15 June 2015	Arena Lviv, Lviv, Ukraine	Luxembourg	3–0	3–0	UEFA Euro 2016 qualification
11	5 September 2015	Arena Lviv, Lviv, Ukraine	Belarus	3–0	3–1	UEFA Euro 2016 qualification
12	29 May 2016	Stadio Olimpico Grande Torino, Turin, Italy	Romania	1–3	3–4	Friendly
13	3 June 2016	Stadio Atleti Azzurri d'Italia, Bergamo, Italy	Albania	3–1	3–1	Friendly
14	11 June 2017	Ratinan Stadium, Tampere, Finland	Finland	1–0	2–1	2018 FIFA World Cup qualification
15	10 November 2017	Arena Lviv, Lviv, Ukraine	Slovakia	2–1	2–1	Friendly
16	3 June 2018	Stade Camille Fournier, Évian-les-Bains, France	Albania	1–0	4–1	Friendly
17	3 June 2018	Stade Camille Fournier, Évian-les-Bains, France	Albania	4–1	4–1	Friendly
18	6 September 2018	Městský fotbalový stadion, Uherské Hradiště, Czech Republic	Czech Republic	1–1	2–1	2018–19 UEFA Nations League B
19	16 November 2018	Štadión Antona Malatinského, Trnava, Slovakia	Slovakia	1–2	1–4	2018–19 UEFA Nations League B
20	7 June 2019	Arena Lviv, Lviv, Ukraine	Serbia	3–0	5–0	UEFA Euro 2020 qualification
21	7 June 2019	Arena Lviv, Lviv, Ukraine	Serbia	5–0	5–0	UEFA Euro 2020 qualification

== Honours ==
Dnipro Dnipropetrovsk

- UEFA Europa League runner-up: 2014–15

Sevilla

- UEFA Europa League: 2015–16
- Copa del Rey runner-up: 2015–16
- Supercopa de España runner-up: 2016
- UEFA Super Cup runner-up: 2016

Shakhtar Donetsk

- Ukrainian Premier League: 2019–20
- Ukrainian Super Cup: 2021

Individual

- Ukrainian Footballer of the Year: 2010, 2012, 2013 (jointly shared with Andriy Yarmolenko)
- Ukrainian Premier League Player of the Year: 2011–12, 2013–14
- UEFA Europa League Squad of the Season: 2014–15
