= Pavel Kucherov =

Russian former footballer (born 1964)

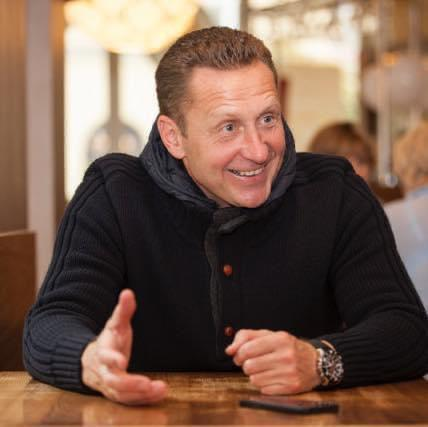

Personal information
- Full name: Pavel Vladimirovich Kucherov
- Date of birth: 18 August 1964 (age 62)
- Place of birth: Smolensk, Soviet Union
- Height: 1.86 m (6 ft 1 in)
- Position: Central defender

Youth career
- 1973–1979: Iskra Smolensk

Senior career*
Years	Team	Apps	(Gls)
1979–1981	Iskra Smolensk (reserves)		
1981–1984	Skif Smolensk		
1982–1985	Temp Orsha		
1985–1986	Spartak Oryol		
1987–1989	Divizion Smolensk		

Managerial career
- 1989–1991: Divizion Smolensk
- 1994–1995: Zwaluw VFC Vught (youth academy)
- 1995–1998: TOP Oss (youth academy)
- 1998–2005: Willem II Tilburg (youth academy)
- 2005–2009: Willem II Tilburg (second team)
- 2010–2011: Willem II Tilburg (chief Scout)
- 2010–2011: Willem II Tilburg (assistant)
- 2011–2012: Karpaty Lviv (assistant)
- 2012: Karpaty Lviv
- 2013: Naftan Novopolotsk
- 2013: Dinamo Minsk (assistant)
- 2014-2017: Arsenal (scout)
- 2017-2018: Everton (scout)
- 2018-2020: SC Telstar (scout)
- 2020-2023: PK Soccer (scouting individual coaching and training The Netherlands)
- 2023-present: PK Soccer (scouting individual coaching and training U11-U17 players Valencia)
- * Club domestic league appearances and goals

Pavel Kucherov (Russian: Павел Владимирович Кучеров; born 18 August 1964) is a Russian former footballer. Kucherov was an assistant coach at Dinamo Minsk and later a scout at Arsenal F.C. and Everton F.C.

== Career ==
Born in August 1964 within Smolensk in what is now Russia, Kucherov started his playing days at 11 years old with side Iskra Smolensk. After eight years there he journeyed to club Skif Smolensk in 1981 where he began his professional career. Then he moved to Temp Orsha, stayed there from 1982 to 1985. He ended up having a spell at Spartak Oryol and ended his career at Divizion Smolensk 1989 at the age of 25.

Kucherov is of Dutch citizenry as he had a lengthy spell coaching at Eredivisie side Willem II Tilburg He also coached at club FC Karpaty of Ukraine.
