= Valeriy Zavarov =

Ukrainian footballer

Personal information
- Full name: Valeriy Oleksandrovych Zavarov
- Date of birth: 16 August 1988 (age 38)
- Place of birth: Kyiv, Ukrainian SSR, Soviet Union
- Height: 1.75 m (5 ft 9 in)
- Position: Midfielder

Senior career*
Years	Team	Apps	(Gls)
2006–2009	Arsenal Kyiv	21	(0)
2010–2012	Obolon Kyiv	0	(0)
2013–2014	Obolon-Brovar Kyiv	16	(2)
- * Club domestic league appearances and goals

Valeriy Zavarov (Ukrainian: Валерій Олександрович Заваров; born 16 August 1988) is a Ukrainian former professional football midfielder. He is the son of the famous Dynamo Kyiv and Soviet Union international footballer Oleksandr Zavarov. Valeriy joined Arsenal Kyiv while his father was the head coach there. However, when Oleksandr was fired, Valeriy was also dismissed from the club, and joined Obolon Kyiv. FC Obolon Kyiv dissolved itself in February 2013.
