= Serhiy Konyushenko =

Ukrainian footballer and coach

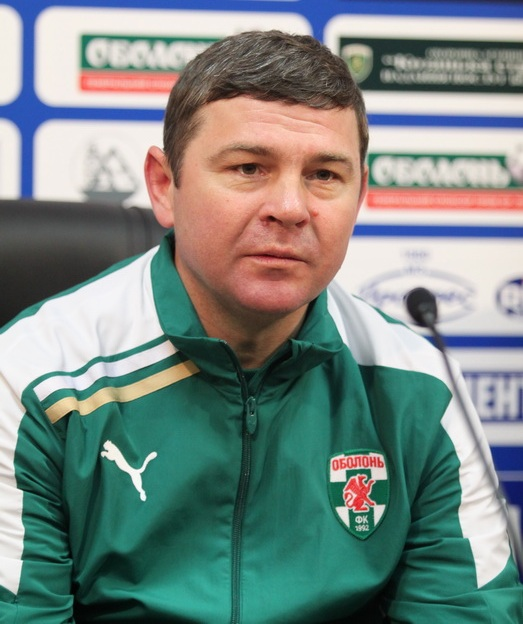
- Konyushenko in 2011

Personal information
- Full name: Serhiy Viktorovych Konyushenko
- Date of birth: 9 July 1971 (age 55)
- Place of birth: Kyiv, Ukrainian SSR
- Height: 1.75 m (5 ft 9 in)
- Position: Defender

Senior career*
Years	Team	Apps	(Gls)
1993–1996	Nyva-Kosmos Myronivka	70	(4)
1996	Polihraftekhnika Oleksandria	1	(0)
1996–1998	Obolon Kyiv	50	(1)
1998–1999	Turan Tovuz	5	(0)
1999–2006	Obolon Kyiv	190	(0)
1999–2006	Obolon-2 Kyiv	24	(1)

Managerial career
- 2006–2011: Obolon Kyiv (assistant)
- 2011–2013: Obolon Kyiv (caretaker)
- 2014: Peskovsky Rubin
- 2016: Toronto Atomic II
- 2017: Chaika Petropavlivska Borshchahivka
- * Club domestic league appearances and goals

Serhiy Konyushenko (Ukrainian: Сергій Вікторович Конюшенко; born 9 July 1971 in Kyiv, Ukrainian SSR, Soviet Union) is a former Ukrainian professional football defender and a Ukrainian football coach.

== Club career ==
Konyushenko began his professional career in 1993 in his native country's fourth division with Nyva Myronivka. After three seasons with Nyva Myronivka, he left to join Polihraftekhnika Oleksandria in the Ukrainian First League. His spell with Oleksandria was brief as he was transferred to Obolon Kyiv in the third division.

In 1998, he ventured abroad to the Azerbaijan Top League to play with Turan Tovuz. Konyushenko played in 5 matches in his only season abroad. Following his stint abroad, he returned to Obolon and helped the club secure a promotion by winning the league title. In 2001, he helped Obolon secure a promotion to the Ukrainian Premier League. Konyushenko made his debut in the country's premier league the following season. The 2004-05 season marked his final season in the premier league as Obolon was relegated to the second division. He remained with Obolon for an additional season, which marked his final professional campaign.

== Managerial career ==
=== Obolon Kyiv ===
After he retired from professional football, he transitioned into the managerial side with Obolon Kyiv as the senior coach for the youth team. In 2011, he became the assistant coach for Vasyl Rats for the youth squad.

Initially, Konyushenko and Vasyl Rats took over the managerial duties of Serhiy Kovalets on an interim basis in November 2011. His match as manager for Kyiv was on November 20, 2011, against Vorskla Poltava. Shortly after, he became the sole caretaker manager for Obolon as Rats resigned due to poor health. The club was relegated from the premier league in its debut season.

The following season, Konyushenko continued managing Kyiv in the Ukrainian First League. However, the season was short-lived as the club owners dissolved the team in February 2013.

Following Obolon's withdrawal and reformation, Konyushenko was named the manager for Peskovsky Rubin in the Kyiv region championship.

=== Canada ===
In the summer of 2016, he was named the head coach for Toronto Atomic's reserve team in the Canadian Soccer League's second division. Konyushenko led Toronto to a victory over London City in his debut match on June 11, 2016. In his debut season in the Canadian circuit, he led Toronto to a playoff berth by finishing second in the division. Their playoff journey started in the semifinal round, where Toronto defeated the Brantford Galaxy's reserve team to advance to the championship finals. The York Region Shooters reserve team defeated Toronto in the championship match.

=== Chaika P. Borshchahivka ===
Konyushenko returned to Ukraine, where he was appointed the manager for Chaika Petropavlivska Borshchahivka in the national amateur league. After several months with the Kyiv-based club, he left the team on November 12, 2017.

== Honours ==
=== Player ===
Obolon Kyiv

- Ukrainian Second League Group C: 1998–99
- Ukrainian Second League Group B: 2000–01

=== Manager ===
Toronto Atomic II

- CSL II Championship runner-up: 2016
