= Yevhen Baryshnikov =

Ukrainian football defensive midfielder

Personal information
- Full name: Yevhen Vitaliyovych Baryshnikov
- Date of birth: 1 August 1988 (age 38)
- Place of birth: Dnipropetrovsk, Ukrainian SSR
- Height: 1.90 m (6 ft 3 in)
- Position: Defensive midfielder

Youth career
- 1999–2005: Dnipro Dnipropetrovsk

Senior career*
Years	Team	Apps	(Gls)
2005–2012	Dnipro Dnipropetrovsk	0	(0)
2008	→ Naftovyk-Ukrnafta Okhtyrka (loan)	13	(1)
2011	→ Kryvbas Kryvyi Rih (loan)	0	(0)

International career
2006	Ukraine U19	2	(0)
2008	Ukraine U21	2	(0)

Managerial career
- 2017–2020: Dnipro-1 (assistant)
- 2019–: Ukraine U21 (fitness coach)
- 2023: Ukraine (fitness coach)
- * Club domestic league appearances and goals

Yevhen Vitaliyovych Baryshnikov (Ukrainian: Євген Віталійович Баришніков; born 1 August 1988) is a Ukrainian football manager and retired defensive midfielder.

== Career ==
For a long time played for reserve or youth teams.
