= Petro Oparin =

Ukrainian footballer

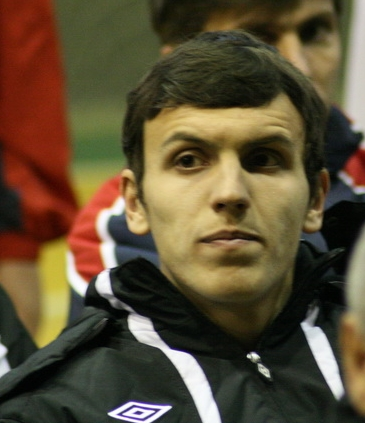

Personal information
- Full name: Petro Andriyovych Oparin
- Date of birth: 13 May 1991 (age 35)
- Place of birth: Saky, Crimean ASSR, Ukrainian SSR
- Height: 1.87 m (6 ft 1 1/2 in)
- Position: Defender

Youth career
- 2004–2008: Shakhtar Donetsk

Senior career*
Years	Team	Apps	(Gls)
2008–2011	Shakhtar Donetsk	0	(0)
2008–2010	→ Shakhtar-3 Donetsk	37	(5)
2011	Tavriya Simferopol	0	(0)
2012	Stal Alchevsk	10	(1)

International career^{‡}
2006	Ukraine-17	6	(0)
- * Club domestic league appearances and goals as of 26 June 2015 ‡ National team caps and goals as of 26 June 2015

Petro Oparin (Ukrainian: Петро Андрійович Опарін; born 13 May 1991) is a Ukrainian football defender.

Oparin began his playing career with Shakhtar Donetsk's youth team. Than he spent some years in Shakhtar Donetsk football system. In February 2011 he signed two years deal with SC Tavriya. But on 31 October 2011 he left this club.

He is a son of another Ukrainian and Soviet footballer Andriy Oparin.

== International career ==
He played some matches for Ukraine national under-17 football team.
